= The Blacklist season 9 =

Season of television series

The Blacklist
- Season 9
- Promotional poster
- Starring: James Spader; Diego Klattenhoff; Amir Arison; Hisham Tawfiq; Laura Sohn; Harry Lennix; Fisher Stevens
- No. of episodes: 22

Release
- Original network: NBC
- Original release: October 21, 2021 – May 27, 2022

Season chronology
- ← Previous; Season 8 Next → Season 10

The ninth season of the American crime thriller television series The Blacklist premiered on October 21, 2021, on NBC, and ended on May 27, 2022. The season consisted of 22 episodes.

This is the first season without Jon Bokenkamp as showrunner and Megan Boone as Elizabeth Keen. It is also the last season to star Amir Arison as Aram Mojtabai and Laura Sohn as Alina Park.

The season is produced by Davis Entertainment, Universal Television and Sony Pictures Television. All executive producers (except Bokenkamp) remain the same: John Eisendrath, John Davis, Joe Carnahan and John Fox.

== Overview ==
The ninth season explores the reunion of Raymond Reddington (James Spader) and the members of his disbanded Task Force two years after Reddington's failed attempt to hand his empire over to Elizabeth Keen (Megan Boone) and the murder of Liz. During that time, many changes related to Reddington's Task Force and his criminal empire have happened: Donald Ressler (Diego Klattenhoff) retired from the FBI and got addicted to oxycodone while residing in a New York suburb, Aram Mojtabai (Amir Arison) developed security software and ran his own business, Dembe Zuma (Hisham Tawfiq) was assigned as an FBI agent, and Marvin Gerard (Fisher Stevens) became the factual leader of Red's collapsing empire. After Dembe's injury in service, Reddington agrees to resume his deal with Harold Cooper (Harry Lennix) and restore his Blacklist of criminals for his immunity. During the season, Reddington and the Task Force discover new details regarding Elizabeth's death. Another main plot is the murder of Cooper's neighbour, for which he is framed by the detectives and blackmailed by the actual killer. Cooper starts his own investigation to find the blackmailer, and both investigations intertwine in search of the same mysterious common enemy.

== Cast ==
=== Main ===
- James Spader as Raymond "Red" Reddington
- Diego Klattenhoff as Donald Ressler
- Amir Arison as Aram Mojtabai
- Laura Sohn as Alina Park
- Hisham Tawfiq as Dembe Zuma
- Harry Lennix as Harold Cooper

=== Recurring ===
- Sami Bray as Agnes Keen
  - Hazel Mason as younger Agnes Keen
- Diany Rodriguez as Weecha Xiu
- Karina Arroyave as Mierce Xiu
- Fisher Stevens as Marvin Gerard
- Valarie Pettiford as Charlene Cooper
- Colby Lewis as Peter Simpson
- Danny Mastrogiorgio as Lew Sloan
- Mike Houston as Detective Heber
- Deirdre Lovejoy as Cynthia Panabaker
- Teddy Coluca as Teddy Brimley
- Jonathan Holtzman as Chuck
- Mario Peguero as Santiago

=== Guest starring ===
- Genson Blimline as Morgan
- Stacy Keach as Robert Vesco
- Aida Turturro as Heddie Hawkins
- Joely Richardson as Cassandra Bianchi
- Patricia Richardson as Matilda David
- Ross Partridge as Reggie Cole
- Teagle F. Bougere as Tyson Lacroix
- Gregory Korostishevsky as Vladmir Cvetko
- Mozhan Marnò as Samar Navabi
- Lukas Hassel as Elias Vandyke
- Chin Han as Wujing

== Episodes ==
No. overall	No. in season	Title	Blacklist guide	Directed by	Written by	Original release date	US viewers (millions)
175	1	"The Skinner"	No. 45	Christine Moore	John Eisendrath & Lukas Reiter	October 21, 2021	3.07
Two years after Elizabeth Keen's death, the task force has disbanded and Reddington's whereabouts are unknown. Meanwhile, Dembe, who is now an FBI agent, is injured while his partner is killed, forcing Cooper to recruit the task force and search for Reddington. Later on, Cooper finds Reddington who informs him to find The Skinner, who was responsible for the attack.
176	2	"The Skinner: Conclusion"	No. 45	Matthew McLoota	Lukas Reiter & John Eisendrath	October 28, 2021	2.81
The former task force continue their search for The Skinner who kidnapped a programmer and his family in hopes of receiving a rare microchip. Meanwhile, Cooper asks for help from an old colleague who is now a senator, for a favor.
177	3	"The SPK"	No. 178	Christine Moore	Daniel Cerone	November 4, 2021	3.09
Reddington enlists the task force in finding the Supreme Priori Knighthood (SPK) who specialize in stealing artifacts. Their leader is none other than Robert Vesco, who ran off with Reddington's money back in Season 6. Vesco tells Reddington that his money is in Malta, and they plan to go there; when Vesco learns his goons plan to bomb a church, he goes and tries to stop them but fails which forces Reddington to save him. Afterwards, Aram opts out of his company to continue working with the task force, Park confronts Ressler about his failed drug test, Dembe arrests Vesco on Red's plane and Reddington finally meets Agnes.
178	4	"The Avenging Angel"	No. 49	Andrew McCarthy	Sean Hennen	November 11, 2021	2.99
Dembe visits Reddington, who enlists him and the task force to take down the Avenging Angel, who rights the wrongs done to people by others. Cooper wakes up not knowing what happened, and finds out that Charlene's fling, Doug Koster, is dead. Cooper runs ballistic tests using his contacts, and finds out the deadly bullet was from his gun, presumably making him Doug's killer. Meanwhile, Park gives Ressler her own urine sample so that he can pass his drug test. Afterwards, the test shows an inconsistency in hormonal ratings which correlates to cancer. Also, Reddington buys the painting that the Avenging Angel wants and kills her over her actions in the same manner she is accustomed to.
179	5	"Benjamin T. Okara"	No. 183	Jono Oliver	Noah Schechter	November 18, 2021	2.94
Reddington gives Dembe and the task force a case involving DARPA military technology, stolen by the head scientist, who is taking revenge on the fellow scientists who made the device with him. Park hides the fact that she is back on the task force from her husband, Dembe's status as an FBI agent threatens Red's operations and Harold and Charlene get questioned by the head detective investigating Doug Koster's death, where Charlene backs up Harold's alibi. Charlene becomes distraught after lying, Alina and Peter find out Alina never had cancer but she was pregnant, Okara commits suicide because of the effects he suffered from creating the weapon and Dembe and Reddington fight over if he's "in" or "out"; since Reddington asks Dembe to kill the man who was trying to do business with Red, who refused due to Dembe's status as an FBI agent, Dembe refuses, and opens the box that Red gave him if he was to leave their business ventures. Alina lets out her emotions, while Ressler comforts her and Peter walks away angrily.
180	6	"Dr. Roberta Sand, Ph.D."	No. 153	Andrew McCarthy	T Cooper & Allison Glock-Cooper	December 9, 2021	2.89
When a congressman survives an attack with no loose ends leading to a striker, Red informs Cooper that the real target was his wife, who caught the bullet instead. She was an obstacle for a powerful syndicate, risen with the help of their therapist, Dr. Sand. The task force, with help from Dembe search for a sniper and when he is detained, they arrange a meeting with Dr. Sand to capture her. Meanwhile, Red launches a new investigation to find if Elizabeth Keen knew his identity before dying two years ago and receives a positive fingerprint result on a letter she had to collect from Dembe after Red is murdered. Cooper struggles with a ballistic test and gets away with murder helped by Lew, and Park's relationship with Peter escalates. While Dembe and Park prevent the murder of an informant, Red rescues Dr. Sand with a request to work with him. Later, Cooper receives a phone call from a blackmailer who has information on his participation in killing Doug Koster.
181	7	"Between Sleep and Awake"	None	Christine Moore	Taylor Martin	January 6, 2022	3.53
As a tragic anniversary approaches, Ressler takes a day off and walks to Liz's grave, recalling some recent events that happened after Liz’s death. While on his way to a cemetery, he tries to recuperate his mental condition and move forward.
182	8	"Dr. Razmik Maier"	No. 168	Avi Youabian	Justine Neubarth	January 13, 2022	3.41
The task force investigates a doping doctor, who first helps athletes rise and then kills them. As Red points them toward a betting company, the doctor is desperately trying to clear an enthusiastic journalist. When Park and Ressler are sent to her house and find her dead, Ressler tries to steal her oxycodone prescription but Park stops him from doing so, which makes her angry with Ressler because he has ruined her trust and is still using drugs. When Dembe and Aram arrive at the place of Razmik's next victim, they find her unconscious and his corpse in the trunk of his co-worker's car. Park and Aram arrest him just in time before he could end his target. Meanwhile, investigations of both Red and Cooper bring about their fruitful results and terrible consequences.
183	9	"Boukman Baptiste"	No. 164	Andrew McCarthy	David Merritt	January 20, 2022	3.43
Reddington gives the new task to Cooper after recent organised murders of his three port keepers and asks him to track the killers down. He also orders Cooper to replace Dembe in light of latest events. Dembe and Ressler set out to the last port left, where they stumble upon the terrorists with the leader had been killed during one of Dembe's attack; in fact, he was not killed but his son was, prompting him to revenge. When Dembe is captured, the group set out to kidnap his daughter Isabella, and Ressler saves Dembe. As they arrive too late, when the only option left is to give up Red's empire, Dembe first reveals the events of the last two years to Red, who agrees to help. Dembe, with the help of Weecha, Chuck, Morgan, and Santiago, save Isabella, killing all the terrorists in between. Meanwhile, Marvin Gerard talks to Red, trying to get him back on his ruining empire.
184	10	"Arcane Wireless"	No. 154	Michael Caracciolo	Sam Christopher	February 25, 2022	2.94
Heddie, now an undercover seller, is caught by FBI and asks Red and Marvin for help. Marvin is up for a rescue, whereas Red uses the task force only to give them a hint on an untraceable telephone company, Arcane Wireless, which is able to provide the telephones to every single criminal. During the investigation, Aram meets his mentor, who made him a professional technician and is ready to take Aram's place in the company he just left. As the search advances, some unexpected details come up, such as the network is not criminal at all but is connected to Red and Heddie's arrest.
185	11	"The Conglomerate"	No. 142	Adam Weisinger	Aiah Samba	March 4, 2022	2.72
The whereabouts of Agent Park in two years are revealed as the task force is hunting a group of assassins. Working undercover, she has to impress some ghosts of her past and not break her life with Peter. Meanwhile, Red receives a notebook of Vandyke and Aram discovers that he used a tracking device on Liz, with the last signal coming from the cemetery where she was buried, causing Red to request to exhume her body.
186	12	"The Chairman"	No. 171	Bethany Rooney	Katie Bockes	March 18, 2022	2.63
Serious trouble occurs when Reddington gives a handler of a criminal stock market to the task force. His real name is unknown, mostly in terms of privacy and security rules of the black market, so he was named as The Chairman. One of the companies connected to the stock market was a money laundering Albanian casino, also listed on the white market, and already a suspect of Washington Gaming Enforcement. Two of their agents were sent undercover, one of them is exposed and killed, second is on the way. When Aram successfully places a recording device and Dembe forces the casino owner to surround, the investigation still has moved nowhere; with the help of Red, Cooper spreads gossip about the revelation of the market, with now all companies losing their shares, except CoC, belonging to Reddington. He attends an emergency meeting, sending its location to FBI, so all the market comes captured. Meanwhile, Red, and Cooper make a decision to exhume the body of Liz in order to find a tracking device, which weakens Ressler's mental condition and makes him take painkillers again. The device comes out to be unique, and as a result with its information hidden. Agent Park and the rest of the task force meet Ressler at the cemetery, where they take his pills away and say a final farewell to Elizabeth. At the same time, Cooper's blackmailer phones him and Lew, and asks to hide a man named Andrew Kennison and change his identity.
187	13	"Genuine Models, Inc."	No. 176	Mahesh Pailoor	T Cooper & Allison Glock-Cooper	March 25, 2022	2.71
When an ambassador is strangled to death in his house, the task force starts digging into an escort service, which provides well-known people with covered assassins. They manage to stop the murder streak on the third attempt, with Aram discovering that the woman sent to kill the politicians was a vessel for a professional AI, making her a high-end human robot. The head inventor of it states that all three victims have purchased the robot, but the settings have been made not to harm the people, so somebody has been controlling them outside. Meanwhile, Red's old friend Barnie dies of a heart stroke, and Red heads to a memorial, where he meets his old acquaintance, Cassandra. She vows to steal a ruby necklace, received by him during his work on the Middle East, and originally proposed as a present for his wife. They have to rob Matilda, an old lady, who accidentally wore it on the memorial, but she is not as gullible and easy as they initially thought. At the same time, Cooper and Lew race against Detective Heber, who becomes more concerned about Cooper's role in the murder of Doug Koster to a key witness, who is able to justify Cooper and lead to a blackmailer.
188	14	"Eva Mason"	No. 181	John Terlesky	Taylor Martin	April 1, 2022	2.92
A woman is found in the woods, tortured and nearly dead. When she is identified as Cynthia Panabaker's daughter-in-law, Sheila, she asks Reddington and the task Force to find the one responsible for this, while Sheila is on respirator. Ressler and Dembe go to her hospital, where the doctor unveils the two names cut on her thigh, belonging to two missing mothers. The only connection between them and Sheila is raising money for the same charity fund fighting with the children terminal deceases, with each woman being abducted a week after their donation. Meanwhile, the abductor tries to fill the place freed by Sheila with a new candidate but fails, loses her injection device, and leaves right before Ressler and Dembe appear. Meanwhile, Red and Weecha pay a visit to Herbie, his healer, as it comes out that the tracker found in Liz has more medical use: it is made to track the amount of medicine taken. Together, they help the task force locate the recipient of an injector and find an undercover hospital with all the abducted victims there, barely alive. They also find out that the mothers were not the victims and not innocent, as they all applied Munchausen by proxy on their children, and the abductor, aside of being a serial killer, was only mirroring the disease already imposed on the children to their mothers. Meanwhile, Red and Herbie discover a new string from a tracking device leading to Andrew Kennison, and Ressler passes a milestone in fighting his oxycodone addiction.
189	15	"Andrew Kennison"	No. 185	Mahesh Pailoor	Lukas Reiter	April 8, 2022	3.06
Reddington arrives at the hostel of Andrew Kennison only to find him missing for a few weeks; he is kept in a safe house by Cooper. Setting the task force on red alert, Red fixes Kennison on the list, sending Cooper into a spiral. The investigation almost immediately leads to Cooper. Having no other choice, he tells both Cynthia and Red about what he and Lew had done, from a counterfeit alibi provided by Charlene and the bullet expertise composed by Lew to the murder of a bartender. Red refuses to help Cooper, saying he would have given a helping hand if Cooper had asked him right after the murder of Doug Koster, as they agree. Cynthia forces Cooper to speak up in front of the squad, then has Ressler to incarcerate him. Weecha and Red head straight to the safe house, where Kennison is kept, and abduct him. After the question of a medical monitor, Kennison gives the hint on an NYPD retired officer, who bought the tracker for the use as a locator. The task force also gets a lead from a voicemail after Aram identified the speech of the same officer. Red and his crew arrives first, but they find him already on the run; Ressler and Dembe spot him running and arrest him just before Chuck and Morgan appeared. Before he faces any questions from Cynthia or Ressler, his attorney arrives at their secret headquarters and prohibits any interrogation. He also fully imposed their involvement into the Elizabeth case, both mentioning Liz and VanDyke during his explanations. He leaves with his client from the building. Both of them are killed by an assassin as Red watches from nearby.
190	16	"Helen Maghi"	No. 172	John Terlesky	Daniel Cerone	April 15, 2022	2.85
With Cooper on trial, Aram is appointed the new boss of the task force, right in time for the next case. This time the Blacklister is his colleague, a storage facility owner who provides vaults for Red and the recently murdered detective. She is also on the FBI's list after being suspected of selling heavy artillery abroad. When she is off the list, with the assistance of her and the task force, Red and Dembe break into the unit but find nothing there, except the two DVDs of Red's narrations to Liz about how to do his job. When Red and Dembe escape the facility, Aram commands the takeover group to arrest Helen. Red gets her out of the arrest by sending his imposters once again, and relocates her to Como. Meanwhile, Cooper makes a deal, in which he will plead guilty and be sentenced for two years, and Charlene will not face any accusations against her. Lew uncovers some more of the truth about Harold, which makes the deal impossible. After Red talks with Cynthia, Cooper is recognized as an undercover agent working to find the murderer of Doug Koster. With that acknowledged, Cooper returns to the task force as a regular agent and a month to finish his investigation. Red refuses to work with the Task Force after Aram went against his wishes, but Cooper convinces him to give him one more chance to the rest of the team.
191	17	"El Conejo"	No. 177	Andrew McCarthy	Sean Hennen	April 22, 2022	3.26
Two years prior, Aram, a skilled technician, introduced his state-of-the-art security system with outstanding offensive qualities to his friend, an owner of the IT-company. In the present, Aram, a newly designated director of Counterrorism division, is kidnapped by a cartel recently turned into an avocado selling corporation because of his program. A hacker broke into the supplement line of the corporation and impaired it, leaving Aram's name all over the code. This causes Reddington to put the leader of the cartel, Don Marquez, on the list and the task force to start the investigation. With the help of Red, they disclose the headquarters of the cartel and save Aram, but Marquez escapes along with his son. When Marquez learns the truth about the attack, he tries to shoot his son, but the task force arrive earlier and arrest Marquez. Shocked by the power of his invention, Aram decides to close his system before any more accidents occur, despite his friend's unwillingness. Meanwhile, Red is off to Montenegro, where his associate is keeping a safe where the discs found in the underground storage had to be, waiting for Liz to appear. When he finishes his search looking for the thief, it is revealed that his unique safe is a counterfeit ordered by Mr. Kaplan, who had jumped off a bridge in season 4.
192	18	"Laszlo Jankowics"	No. 180	Christine Gee	Lukas Reiter	April 29, 2022	3.09
Reddington desperately tries to find Mr. Kaplan by contacting her closest allies. One of them is her sister, who hints him on Clara Moore, her cleaner. To find her at ease, Red gives the task force a name of Laszlo Jankowics, her proximate friend. Laszlo is a son of Marko Jankowics, a former blacklister killed in season 6, and the claimer of Marko's drug empire; he himself is addicted to drugs and always sees a hallucinatory lion standing for him. He tries to kill his ex-partner after he attempts selling his psychedelics legally. He attacks the university where the project has begun but fails to kill his colleague, with a bullet stuck in a bulletproof panel. Red hunts down the colleague and provokes Laszlo to encounter him and tell him the coordinates of Clara, after which he ambushes her and finds out that a meeting with Kaplan was scheduled for the evening. He arrives at the meeting place with Cooper and sends Weecha, Chuck, and Morgan to arrest Kaplan; after they enter the house, it goes off with an enormous explosion. Meanwhile, the task force interfere in Laszlo's meeting at the port but lose Laszlo due to Park's permanent headaches. Also, Park makes her future, Aram writes an annual report, Cooper and Ressler argue about the investigation of Cooper's blackmailer, and Red admits he does not trust Aram anymore.
193	19	"The Bear Mask"	None	Matthew McLoota	Noah Schechter	May 6, 2022	2.76
The worries recently plaguing Aram — Liz's death, his new appointment, and the theft (and subsequent destruction) of his self-made software — have finally depressed him; in search of relief, he signs up for ketamine therapy. In a coma, he finds himself trapped in a time loop of the task force being attacked by dozens of terrorists, led by a man in a bear mask, resulting in everyone on the team being killed except him, with a creepy recording of "What a Wonderful World" playing. Aram battles with the Bear Mask, his evil mutual self; with the help of hallucinative Samar, he resurrects his mental condition. Meanwhile, Cooper and Ressler dig deeper into Tyson Lacroix, the lawyer of Reginald Cole, and find his wife assassinated, with the killer arrested right after committing murder. It comes out that he was sponsored by an account in the most secured bank ever and by Red's account there. Reddington visits Weecha after the explosion and informs her that Morgan has died while capturing the woman he believed was Mr. Kaplan, but was actually Maureen. Soon, Mierce comes after her to help healing her and Red leaves his van to clear way for her. Finally, Aram sits down at his table, with Samar sitting on one side of it and the Bear Mask on another. This episode was set in memory of Kurt Perez, a person whose engagement with the show is unknown. He died in 2022 after a car crash.
194	20	"Caelum Bank"	No. 169	Cort Hessler	Sean Hennen	May 13, 2022	2.77
In cooperation with the task force, Red is able to ground the illicit, jet-headquartered Caelum Bank and its fund controller, Harris Gramercy. Red arranges to be jailed with Gramercy, after which he shoots him to get information on who was the last person to access his funds. Evidence leads to Heddie, who swears her innocence. The task force finds evidence that Marvin had a connection to Lacroix's family and is the true culprit, and Red had already reached the same conclusion. Marvin states he was never going to allow Liz to take over Red's empire. As Red prepares to kill Marvin, the latter reveals he has a gun trained on Mierce, and that she will be killed if he does not complete his appointed check-ins.
195	21	"Marvin Gerard: Conclusion, Pt. 1"	No. 80	Christine Moore	Daniel Cerone	May 20, 2022	2.70
Reddington and the task force split after their divergent opinions about Marvin Gerard: Red wants him killed while Cooper needs Marvin alive to prove his own innocence and save himself from imprisonment. Dembe fluctuates about his side and ends up being with Red, who arranges a meeting with his essential members of the empire in his residence. Marvin finds out his plans through a tracker and orders his assassin lord, Henrick Fisker, to deploy his mercenaries. They attack the residence, kill most of Red's associates, and surround Red and Dembe, but Dembe manages to make an urgent call to the task force. Ressler and the squad rescue Red and capture one of the mercenaries. Red reaches Fisker and heads to the airport where Fisker and Gerard arranged a meeting, but Cooper activates the alarm in the last minute, leaving a way for Gerard to escape from Red, who cuts ties with the task force. Meanwhile, the murder of Elizabeth is explained.
196	22	"Marvin Gerard: Conclusion, Pt. 2"	No. 80	Cort Hessler	Lukas Reiter	May 27, 2022	2.82
Task force members arrest Marvin as he attempts to leave the airport. Despite Red’s objections, Panabaker listens to Marvin’s proposal for a deal. On condition he is freed and a new task force is assembled, he will provide a Blacklist, more valuable than Red’s list. Reddington will no longer be of use and can be jailed. Panabaker agrees to this to save Cooper and sends Marvin to remand, where an assassin, Wujing, asks for his legal assistance to finalise an escape plan. Red infiltrates a court house for a final talk with Marvin. He has to die for killing Elizabeth but will be allowed to choose his own death. Before committing suicide, Marvin tells Wujing that Reddington is an FBI informant responsible for the arrest of Wujing and many other criminals. He provides a list of people who might want to remove Red. Potential charges against him dropped, Cooper remains in charge of the task force. They all attend Elizabeth's grave on the third anniversary of her death. There, Aram and Park, who is pregnant, both announce they are leaving the task force for an undetermined period of time. Meanwhile, Wujing escapes from prison and plots a campaign against Red.

== Production ==
=== Development ===
Series creator Jon Bokenkamp did not return as a showrunner for this season. Executive producer John Eisendrath took his place as a showrunner.

=== Casting ===
- Megan Boone departed the series prior to the start of filming the season. However, the character she portrayed, Elizabeth Keen, made brief appearances throughout the season.
- Sami Bray joined the series in a recurring role as Agnes Keen.
- Diany Rodriguez joined the series in a recurring role as Weecha Xiu.
- Karina Arroyave took the recurring role as Mierce Xiu.
- Colby Lewis was promoted to a recurring role throughout the season as Peter Simpson following his guest appearance in the first episode of the season.
- Mozhan Marnò returned to the series for the first time after her departure in season 6 as Samar Navabi.
- Genson Blimline, who had been portraying Morgan, departed near the end of the season after his character died offscreen.
- Shortly after the season finale, both Arison and Sohn left the series after nine and two series, respectively. Arison later starred in The Kite Runner on Broadway, while Sohn moved to other projects. Meanwhile, Fisher Stevens, who also departed following the episode, got nominated for 47th Saturn Awards for best guest starring role.

=== Filming ===
Filming for the season began in September 2021 with fully safety protocols amid the COVID-19 pandemic. In February 2022, it was mentioned that 22 episodes were to be filmed for the season. Filming officially wrapped in May 2022.

== Ratings ==
Viewership and ratings per episode of The Blacklist season 9
No.	Title	Air date	Rating (18–49)	Viewers (millions)	DVR (18–49)	DVR viewers (millions)	Total (18–49)	Total viewers (millions)
1	"The Skinner"	October 21, 2021	0.4	3.07	0.3	2.02	0.6	5.09
2	"The Skinner: Conclusion"	October 28, 2021	0.3	2.81	0.3	1.96	0.6	4.77
3	"The SPK"	November 4, 2021	0.3	3.09	0.3	1.85	0.6	4.94
4	"The Avenging Angel"	November 11, 2021	0.3	2.99	0.3	1.91	0.6	4.90
5	"Benjamin T. Okara"	November 18, 2021	0.3	2.94	0.3	1.88	0.6	4.82
6	"Dr. Roberta Sand, Ph.D."	December 9, 2021	0.3	2.89	0.2	1.86	0.5	4.76
7	"Between Sleep & Awake"	January 6, 2022	0.4	3.53	0.3	1.82	0.7	5.35
8	"Dr. Razmik Maier"	January 13, 2022	0.4	3.41	0.3	2.00	0.7	5.41
9	"Boukman Baptiste"	January 20, 2022	0.4	3.43	0.3	2.06	0.7	5.49
10	"Arcane Wireless"	February 25, 2022	0.3	2.94	0.3	1.88	0.6	4.81
11	"The Conglomerate"	March 4, 2022	0.3	2.72	0.3	1.63	0.6	4.35
12	"The Chairman"	March 18, 2022	0.2	2.63	0.3	1.74	0.5	4.37
13	"Genuine Models, Inc."	March 25, 2022	0.2	2.71	0.3	1.76	0.5	4,46
14	"Eva Mason"	April 1, 2022	0.2	2.92	0.3	1.59	0.5	4.52
15	"Andrew Kennison"	April 8, 2022	0.3	3.06	0.2	1.72	0.5	4.78
16	"Helen Maghi"	April 15, 2022	0.3	2.85	0.2	1.67	0.5	4.52
17	"El Conejo"	April 22, 2022	0.3	3.26	0.3	1.67	0.6	4.93
18	"Laszlo Jancowics"	April 29, 2022	0.2	3.09	0.3	1.74	0.5	4.83
19	"The Bear Mask"	May 6, 2022	0.3	2.76	0.3	1.73	0.6	4.49
20	"Caelum Bank"	May 13, 2022	0.2	2.77	0.3	1.73	0.5	4.50
21	"Marvin Gerard: Conclusion, Part 1"	May 20, 2022	0.2	2.70	—N/a	—N/a	—N/a	—N/a
22	"Marvin Gerard: Conclusion, Part 2"	May 27, 2022	0.2	2.82	—N/a	—N/a	—N/a	—N/a
