= The Blacklist season 10 =

Season of television series

The Blacklist
- Season 10
- Official poster
- Starring: James Spader; Diego Klattenhoff; Hisham Tawfiq; Harry Lennix; Anya Banerjee
- No. of episodes: 22

Release
- Original network: NBC
- Original release: February 26 – July 13, 2023

Season chronology
- ← Previous; Season 9

The tenth and final season of the American crime thriller television series The Blacklist was ordered on February 22, 2022, and premiered on February 26, 2023, on NBC. The season concluded the series on July 13, 2023, with the final two episodes.

James Spader, Diego Klattenhoff, Hisham Tawfiq, and Harry Lennix returned for the season, while Anya Banerjee debuted in a new main role. It is the only season of the series not to star Amir Arison and Laura Sohn after their promotion to main cast, although Arison makes a guest appearance. It is also the second and final season without Megan Boone.

The season is produced by Davis Entertainment, Universal Television, and Sony Pictures Television. John Eisendrath, John Davis, Joe Carnahan, and John Fox continue to serve as executive producers of the series, while series creator Jon Bokenkamp returned as an executive producer.

== Cast and characters ==
=== Main ===
- James Spader as Raymond "Red" Reddington
- Diego Klattenhoff as Donald Ressler
- Hisham Tawfiq as Dembe Zuma
- Anya Banerjee as Siya Malik
- Harry Lennix as Harold Cooper

=== Recurring ===
- Sami Bray as Agnes Keen, the daughter of Elizabeth Keen who is now in Cooper's care and is frequently visited by Reddington.
- Chin Han as Wujing, a Chinese assassin and the second Blacklister to be put in prison. He escaped custody in season 9 and now gathers released Blacklisters for his campaign to take down Red.
- Kenneth Lee as Zhang Wei, Wujing's right-hand man.
- Deirdre Lovejoy as Cynthia Panabaker, a United States Senator in charge of Cooper's Task Force.
- Jonathan Holtzman as Chuck, Reddington's helper.
- Stacy Keach as Robert Vesco, a fictionalized version of the criminal financier, who accompanies Reddington on his escapades.
- Alex Brightman as Herbie Hambright, the latest member of the Task Force who hopes to escape household routine and his baby daughter. He uses his versatile knowledge to assist the Task Force.
- Mackenzie Astin as Jonathan Pritchard, a doubtful FBI agent whom Ressler helps to overcome drug addiction, later a key figure in Hudson's investigation.
- Toby Leonard Moore as Arthur Hudson, a purposeful United States House of Representatives member who conducts a partly legal investigation against Task Force after noting the government's significant expenses on it.
- Diany Rodriguez as Weecha Xiu, a former bodyguard of Reddington and his new girlfriend.
- Mario Peguero as Santiago, Reddington's soldier.
- Derrick Williams as Jordan Nixon, Hudson's former colleague and asset within the FBI. He supervises the Task Force as they attempt to capture Reddington.

=== Guest starring ===
- Amir Arison as Aram Mojtabai, a former member of the Task Force who is settling in New York.
- Daniel Sauli as Alban Veseli / The Freelancer, a serial killer and the first Blacklister to be arrested.
- Chris L. McKenna as Richard Deever, Wujing's associate and a former colleague to Siya at MI-6.
- Teddy Coluca as Teddy Brimley, a private animal-loving torturer of Reddington.
- Alex Shimizu as Tadashi Ito, Reddington's cyber specialist.
- Anzu Lawson as Mariko Ito, Tadashi's mother worrying for his criminal connections.
- Laverne Cox as Dr. Laken Perillos, a chemotherapy torturer and former Blacklister who is obsessed with Dembe.
- Aaron Yoo as Bo Chang/The Troll Farmer, a former Blacklister specializing in creating viral social media incidents.
- Nikita Tewani as young Meera Malik. Malik was one of Cooper's Task Force members in season 1.
- Wayne Duvall as Clayton Dorf, a United States Senator who helps Hudson on his investigation.
- Francie Swift as Blair Foster, a fixer and Washington's crime concierge.
- Marylouise Burke as Paula Carter, Reddington's associate and mother to the late Glen Carter.
- Aida Turturro as Heddie Hawkins, Reddington's money launderer who has helped him since the fifth season.
- Andrew McCarthy as Red's pilot Edward. He was mentioned and voiced multiple times previously but was never seen on camera. McCarthy also directed three episodes of the season.

== Episodes ==
No. overall	No. in season	Title	Blacklist guide	Directed by	Written by	Original release date	US viewers (millions)
197	1	"The Night Owl"	None	Cort Hessler	Lukas Reiter	February 26, 2023	2.32
An explosion occurs in New York where Aram spots Reddington, who has been missing for six months, near the explosion site. Dembe and Ressler arrive at the exploded building, which is also a Chinese annex. They investigate it, identify the victim, and retrieve her notebook. The victim was a former member of the Fribourg Confidence who was once on Red's Blacklist. The files extracted from her notebook lead to Pablo Picasso's sculpture called The Night Owl, which was stored by a transferring company in Montserrat. There, the group finds out that it is a black site used by MI-6, while The Night Owl is the codename of The Freelancer. They also meet Siya, the daughter of Meera Malik who now works as an MI-6 agent. She helps Dembe and Ressler proceed with their operation. Meanwhile, Wujing and his mercenary squad launch an attack on the building to rescue The Freelancer. Eventually, Wujing frees him and enlists him as an ally, whilst Ressler, Dembe, and Siya return to Washington where they meet Reddington. He tells them about Wujing's intentions and reveals that he orchestrated the explosion in New York. When he leaves the Post Office, he tells Dembe that he stopped using his private transport and security but refuses to explain the reasons for doing that. Meanwhile, Cooper and Siya discuss the possibility of her joining the Task Force.
198	2	"The Whaler"	No. 165	Michael Caracciolo	Sean Hennen	March 5, 2023	1.76
Wujing is spotted at multiple private casinos around the world, associating himself with a gambling specialist known as The Whaler. Reddington enlists Ressler and the new team member Siya undercover at her upcoming game in Sydney to connect with The Whaler. Red puts Siya in a leading spot, which causes Ressler to have concerns about Siya ending up the same way as Meera and Elizabeth Keen, as he thinks she does not understand the danger of her new job. During the game, they are escorted out by The Whaler's security, who plans to torture them for information as to who they really are. They manage to break out on their own shortly after being exposed as law enforcement agents. They move to the security office and find out that Wujing, who also attended the game, was using it as a cover to launder the money stuck in his Chinese bank accounts and finance his campaign against Reddington. Meanwhile, Red attends the game by blackmailing The Whaler and using 6 million in diamonds to play against Wujing and get to know his rival. Cooper and Dembe give a hint to the Australian police department, and they raid the casino and deprive Wujing of his winnings. He escapes and later kills The Whaler for her betrayal to Reddington.
199	3	"The Four Guns"	No. 199	Matthew McLoota	Katie Bockes	March 12, 2023	1.89
When Cooper attends one of Cynthia Panabaker's pre-election briefings, an attempted assault is carried out on Panabaker, leaving two expert bodyguards disarmed and one of them injured. To guarantee security for Cooper and Panabaker, Reddington gives details on the Four Guns, a group of unequalled pickpockets who use their skills to complete sophisticated missions and were never connected with Wujing's offensive. The Task Force reaches out to one of them. He refuses to talk until he is interrogated by Reddington, where he talks about the mastermind behind an attack named Lucas Roth, a former secret service agent who worked with two presidents, including former Blacklister Robert Diaz, whose counsel was Panabaker. Ressler is sent to assist Panabaker in her debate. She is attacked during the meeting and captured by Roth on the escape route. Roth unmasks the traitor within her security, who passed personal information on to her opponent. Cynthia shoots Roth, while Ressler arrests both him and the traitor. Roth explains to Dembe that his intention was to unmask the corruption in the Secret Service after he failed to get anyone to listen to him. Cooper later tells Cynthia that there will be a massive investigation into the corruption while her actions have garnered Cynthia public support. Meanwhile, Reddington uses The Four Guns to set Robert Vesco free so they could set off for a treasure hunt.
200	4	"The Hyena"	No. 200	John Terlesky	Daniel Cerone	March 19, 2023	1.72
An attorney gets killed in a bathroom. At Cooper's house, Reddington explains to Cooper that the killing was an attempt to find the hidden wealth of a late investor named Warren Bostwick. The team discover a video recorded by Bostwick before his death, shown to the team by Kendall, one of his triplet daughters. Bostwick explains three clues through a poem, where each clue is one part of a password to all of Bostwick's digital wealth, and each clue corresponds to each of his daughters. Bostwick did this for his triplet daughters to work together and bond as a family since they have been quite divided. After one of the daughters, Kendall, refuses to let Ressler and Dembe see the poem containing the clues, Reddington got the poem through an associate cryptanalyst that Kendall worked with. Red requests Vesco's help instead of the Task Force to decipher the clues of the poem using their combined wisdom. Elsewhere, the Hyena finds and kills Kendall, learning her clue in the process. The team find Alex, one of the other daughters, and keeps surveillance on her, whilst Reddington and Vesco begin solving more clues with Tadashi's help, visiting Alex to figure out the second clue. Meanwhile, the third sister Cordelia is working with The Hyena, who kidnaps Alex to solve her clue. The final clue is at Warren's and his wife's grave, where Reddington confronts and outwits Cordelia, solving the last clue for himself, which allows him access to Warren's wealth. In the final scenes, Vesco is approached by a Zhang Wei, who offers to see him about a "mutual interest". Meanwhile, an unaware Reddington explains to Cooper how he and Vesco have moved on from their previous quarrels.
201	5	"The Dockery Affair"	None	Ruben Garcia	T Cooper & Allison Glock-Cooper	March 26, 2023	1.78
The Task Force investigates the murder of Judge Alice Dockery with the help of Red's forensic scientist Herbie to save the prime suspect from legal accusations for a crime not committed by him. After interrogating parties of her former lawsuits, one of the defendants falls under suspicion and is captured by Ressler and Siya before he could kill his other victim. Meanwhile, Vesco meets with Wujing to discuss Red's betrayal of him. Vesco confronts Red only to hear him prove Wujing's words and joins his campaign against Red shortly after.
202	6	"Dr. Laken Perillos: Conclusion"	No. 70	Michael Caracciolo	Noah Schechter	April 2, 2023	2.06
Wujing orchestrates a prison break in West Virginia to rescue an incarcerated Dr. Laken Perillos. He tells her about Red's secret alliance with the FBI and uses her torture skills to prove that Red is working as a CI with members of the Task Force. He instructs her to extract information from a recently captured Dembe. Meanwhile, Wujing and Vesco contact a recently released Bo Chang, a.k.a. the Troll Farmer, to turn him against Red. On their way to Chang, Vesco drops his phone near the safehouse where Perillos was torturing Dembe to let Reddington and the Task Force locate the safehouse and rescue Dembe. They find Perillos has nearly killed Dembe and got nothing from him. A SWAT unit intercepts Dembe and transfers him to Red's medical crew. There, he is resuscitated and is visited by Red, who tells him about Vesco being his mole in Wujing's organization. In the final scenes, Wujing kills Vesco after he finds out about his betrayal. Wujing also orders his forces to kill Perillos.
203	7	"The Freelancer: Pt. 2"	No. 145	Cort Hessler	Sam Christopher	April 9, 2023	2.12
A private ferry explodes in Baltimore Harbor. Hours before, one of Reddington's associates spotted the Freelancer leaving the ferry, so Red hands over the investigation to the Task Force. Ressler and Dembe head out to the pier from which the ferry sailed, and locate the gloves left by the Freelancer with a toxin used for overheating the ship's engine. They recruit Herbie to help them identify the toxin as their own forensic team is unavailable. After Herbie finishes investigating the bacteria, he notices a recent transaction in Wujing's bank accounts, and this leads the Task Force to the next target; however, they arrive too late to catch The Freelancer or to prevent another explosion. Meanwhile, Reddington visits Rogelio, his old partner, to discuss a breach in his surveillance troops that missed Alban Veseli prior to his attacks. Red finds out that Rogelio has set up his own family business and is now making bedding accessories. Red searches for betrayers and finds out that Veseli himself notified them of his attacks so Wujing could see Red's response and find out about the members of the Task Force by a local photographer who sent him photos of Ressler, Dembe, and Siya via a cloud storage. With the help of Herbie, they find the place of a next attack and stave it off, Veseli unfortunatelyt escapes but they capture the photographer. Shortly after, Wujing's representatives hire Henrick Fiscker's mercenary squad. Meanwhile, it has been one year since Ressler has abstained of drugs and it is suggest that he become the sponsor of an addicted agent named Jonathan.
204	8	"The Troll Farmer: Pt. 2"	No. 38	Jono Oliver	Taylor Martin	April 16, 2023	1.73
Reddington has trouble with steel shipments after one of his port handlers refuses to work with him because of Wujing's conspiracy. Meanwhile, Bo Chang sets up a fake shooting at the hospital and pushes it through social media to draw an NSA agent's attention to it. When he arrives at the hospital and leaves his car, Chang sneaks into the car and extracts data from an agent's badge. The Task Force starts working on the case to find out more about Chang's further operations. The investigation leads them to a top-classified NSA meeting held to introduce a new cyber weapon. Chang interferes into the presentation by forcing an evacuation and steals the suitcase with the weapon. Using the geoposition of a tracking device embedded into the suitcase, the Task Force receives the location of Chang's hideout, strikes it, and captures Chang. Cooper makes Chang work for Reddington and hand the counterfeit suitcase over to Wujing as he comes to the fixed place in exchange for freedom. As Chang awaits Wujing in the park where they agreed to meet, Veseli approaches him instead; the Task Force scares him off and he escapes with Richard Deever, Siya's former partner working for Wujing but recently captured by Red. Veseli is delivered to Red and Deever is incarcerated by the FBI while Chang is not formally freed. Meanwhile, Herbie keeps calling Siya, eager to assist in any possible way to leave his household duties, so Red stands up for him and suggests that Cooper to hire him as part of their team. In a phone call with Cooper, Red anticipates the end of the conflict with Wujing in three days.
205	9	"The Troll Farmer: Pt. 3"	No. 38	Christine Gee	Lukas Reiter	April 23, 2023	1.69
Cooper and the Troll Farmer visit Panabaker's office where she acknowledges the upload of the NSA cyber weapon to an undetected cloud storage. The Troll Farmer is then transported to the Task Force headquarters for future interrogation but escapes and heads to Wujing to give him the coordinates of the building. It was then revealed that Chang was caught in a trap set by the Task Force and Reddington to arrest Wujing. Since the beginning of the season, Red had been building a duplicate of the headquarters only to send someone trusted by Wujing and let him escape, so Wujing could come and use the weapon he retrieved. As Cooper was preparing for an ambush in the duplicate headquarters, Wujing, the Fisker squad, Wei, and Chang arrived at the real, empty Post Office where Chang hacks the FBI database. Wujing begins exploring the Post Office but sees Red's fedora on Herbie's workplace. When Wujing approaches the fedora, Red comes out from his cover and kills him. He then employs the Fisker squad, kills Wei, and commands Chang to erase any files about the confidential informant that could lead to him. Chang releases the NSA asset from the storage and leaves it to the Task Force. When Cooper comes to Post Office with his unsatisfying result, he finds the two bodies, the cyber weapon, and no visual evidence of what has happened. Reddington apologizes to Cooper and is ready for future cooperation even though his escapade could lead to conflicts with Main Justice. Red also says that the problem with Wujing is over and that he is not hunted anymore.
206	10	"The Postman"	No. 173	Kevin Berlandi	Justine Neubarth	April 30, 2023	1.98
A massive shooting occurs at a Virginia prison after a weapon is delivered to one of the inmates. Reddington believes the shooting is connected to the Postman, an elite smuggler. At that time, Cooper was a member of the jury and was the only one to argue against his imprisonment despite all the evidence found at a crime scene. He has been released and has vanished, developing his contraband delivery network to prisoners, and is now working on the creation of the chemical weapon loaded with abrin by delivering to his former roommate the rosary pea seeds to complete the suspension. Herbie discovers that the method of The Postman's deliveries is a silent drone, while Ressler and Cooper locate his workshop through his old case files. At the workshop, Ressler finds out about the Postman's plans to take down an office building where a former city prosecutor works — the one who sent him to prison. Reddington helps the Task Force to neutralize the Postman and sends him to their headquarters where he is captured. Cooper reveals to the Postman that, while he knows that some of the evidence was falsified, other evidence was not taken into account, so he was wrongly sent to prison. Cooper promises to get the previous conviction expunged, although the Postman would be tried for his more recent crimes.
207	11	"The Man in the Hat"	None	Olenka Denysenko	Daniel Cerone	May 7, 2023	1.70
A lone robber attacks a convenience store in Philadelphia and takes four visitors hostage. Livestreaming in the shop showed one of them from the back, with a man resembling Reddington. Due to the threat of Red being arrested by any division other than the Task Force, Cooper sends Ressler and Dembe to calm the situation and check to see if the hostage man is Red. When they arrive, SWAT units had encircled the building. Shortly after, a shot is heard from inside the store. When Ressler and Dembe walk in, the attacker is shot dead after a fight with one of the hostages. There is no Red among them, while the man with Red's coat and fedora turned out to be a regular customer. Instead of a revolver, claimed by the witness to be the weapon, Red's Browning, the same pistol used to murder Wujing and Wei, was found at the crime scene. Meanwhile, Panabaker holds a meeting with Cooper and pledges to launch an official investigation into Reddington's business unless he is turned in by the end of the day. After the hostages send Ressler and Dembe the wrong way, they leave the store with no clue regarding Red, who was hiding in the basement. He escapes at night, rewards the victims, and secretly delivers Peanut Chews from the store to Cooper. He then heads to Panabaker and persuades her to continue working with him. Meanwhile, Siya and Herbie discover the way Malik died in "Berlin" while the DNA tests prove she could not be the biological mother to Siya.
208	12	"Dr. Michael Abani"	No. 198	Andrew McCarthy	Noah Schechter	May 14, 2023	1.66
Michael Abani, a physician who nursed wounded civilians in Taiz is detained by the Yemenese government and is charged with terrorism and supplying the Houthi government. He is set to be executed in three days unless further evidence of his innocence can be found. As the Task Force suffers lack of new cases, Dembe gets a call from his former love interest and Isabella's mother, and visits her. It is revealed that Abani is her fiancé. She asks Dembe to deal with his case and save him from execution. The Task Force digs into the supply chain interferences and Abani's offshore bank account where a considerable amount of money has been deposited for his current service period. It is later revealed that the head of the supply chain had taken control over the account and was laundering the money for himself with no intention to frame Abani. He is arrested by Ressler and Dembe, and is extracted in exchange for Abani with the help of Reddington. Meanwhile, Red spends a day with Agnes. Arthur Hudson, a congressman running for Senate, discovers the Task Force on a list of FBI's budget spreadsheet. As he believes it is unauthorized, Hudson decides to find out more details about it as a way to accuse the FBI of embezzlement. In the meantime, Cooper is concerned about the recent murders of Wujing and Wei.
209	13	"The Sicilian Error of Color"	None	Mahesh Pailoor	T Cooper & Allison Glock-Cooper	May 21, 2023	1.55
In search of answers regarding Meera Malik, Siya joins Red as he embarks on numerous adventures to gather and repossess collectible items for Red's garage sale. During the journey, Red receives the blue 'error of color' stamp, which he later trades off to the wife of Meera's former partner. She pays him by check, which Red gives to Siya as a next direction for her investigation. He also tells Siya the story of Islero and Manolete, showing her the Islero's skull. By the end of the sale, Cooper approaches Red and tells him about the concerns raised by Arthur Hudson, who had partnered with the head of U.S. Senate Intelligence Committee. Red defuses the situation and vows to return to the Task Force. Still, Cooper assigns Siya to him to track his movements. In flashbacks, Meera betrays her partner after he owed the Chechens.
210	14	"The Nowhere Bride"	No. 192	Bethany Rooney	Cristina Boada	May 28, 2023	1.89
The Task Force gets a case from Charlene after her friend's husband goes missing. Soon, they discover that his identity was fictitious, and the family money given to him as a dowry has been withdrawn from the account. It came out that she was a victim of an underground robbery network that sends its operatives to young women so they could marry them and escape with their dowries. It was run by Jemma Parikh, an Indian immigrant who was also deceived and deprived of all her money, and mostly consisted of parolees. Ressler manages to capture one of her associates, while another one falls for his victim and is easily traced by Dembe. They both inform on Parikh's command center where she is arrested. Meanwhile, Reddington arranges a meeting with a Brazilian mafioso who hired Weecha Xiu as bodyguard after she left Red. When the Brazilians leave to consider Red's assistance, he and Weecha share a kiss. After the meeting, he tells Siya everything he knew about Meera and her connection to Siya. He revealed that Meera was working on a sexual slavery case in Calcutta when she found Siya, who was abandoned, and moved to London. Her colleague was using Siya to force Meera to assist him with his debt troubles, which was the reason she let him die from the Chechens. Red could not tell Siya who her real parents were.
211	15	"The Hat Trick"	None	Adam Weisinger	Katie Bockes & Sam Christopher	June 1, 2023	2.78
After Reddington learns about the Task Force's legal issues with Hudson, he gives Cooper three new Blacklisters at once so they could investigate their cases and prove their worth to the court. The first one is Rebecca Anders, a corrupt personal injury lawyer who recently closed a number of private arbitrations. Ressler pays a visit to her latest client and reads his deed on transferring him one million dollars from the firm, which made him disabled. Meanwhile, Cooper receives a copy of the deed signed at the court and finds out that the figure was 3,5 million, so he brings Andrews to interrogation. It came out that she stole the remaining money for her family and herself. The second case was about a recent mass embryo loss at the IVF clinic following the blackout and collapse of all the alarm systems and subsequent rise in temperature. While Red considered the security breach was made by a hacker, Herbie and Siya tie the loss to the head of the clinic security firm whose parents had embryos in an attached storage facility. He confesses and admits he had carried out an attack so as not to split the firm's money with other legatees. The third blacklister is a nurse who uses redundant doses of potassium chloride to overdose her patients and hide the murders by natural causes. After her prompt arrest, she denies the allegations and points to the factory that produced the medicine. The officials are on message but the information about a problem with the conveyors was given by an insider. The management decided to keep it quiet to avoid financial charges. All three blacklisters were only connected by a wildlife fund, to which Red was going to donate his $52.5 million. In the end, Red reveals that the cases were assigned to the Task Force only to teach the members a lesson on how financial wealth may become crucial for people's lives despite the cases were not profound enough for them.
212	16	"Blair Foster"	No. 39	Saray Guidetti	Taylor Martin	June 1, 2023	2.27
Panabaker and Cooper have a meeting with Hudson and Senator Dorf, who wishes them to disclose the purpose and structure of the Task Force; neither Cooper nor Cynthia speaks. Hudson's petition for a court order also fails, and the information on the Task Force remains confidential but Hudson keeps investigating it. Meanwhile, Reddington gives Cooper hints on Blair Foster, the face of corruption in Washington D.C., who aids nationwide corporations in court cases against them. A recent study on the amount of carcinogenic materials in the products of her client is misplaced after its holder suffers a car crash and falls into a coma. He soon recoveres and gives the highlights of his report, but it has been retrieved by Foster's mercenary. Red flies to Cuba in search of details on the mercenary, while Foster is worried about an ongoing investigation. She finds Ressler and tries to convince him to dismiss her case and run for Congress; he refuses. Meanwhile, Dembe and Herbie get details on the writer of the research and head to his house, where they encounter Foster as his attorney. Dembe leaves with no progress made until Red passes them her operative. Using him, the Task Force makes their way to arrest Foster, who uses her power to avoid imprisonment, so Red decides to extract personal information on Dorf from her instead. Foster is released while Dorf is blackmailed by Cooper and is forced to resign. After Hudson loses his ally, Foster makes contact with him and expresses her willingness to collaborate.
213	17	"The Morgana Logistics Corporation"	No. 167	Andrew McCarthy	Aiah Samba	June 8, 2023	2.45
Hudson's attempts to grind into the Task Force continue as he involves his former friend, who is now an FBI agent, in his investigation. He fails to find more information from inside as it lies classified, except for the documents on the meeting of four assistant directors of the FBI, including Cooper. Hudson runs about one of them and receives threats, along with a mention of Dembe. With a photo of Dembe and Red together, plus the information he has about Cooper, Elizabeth, and Ressler, he ties them all to Reddington, considering he tore apart and corrupted the whole system. Meanwhile, Red spends time with Dembe after giving Cooper a clue on two fictive shipping companies organized by a global network of puppet enterprises. The freight of the two companies is stopped and inspected, and it turned out that they were transferring contraband French wines with no tariff fees paid. The FBI visit the companies' main warehouse only to find the corporate office of the State Department of the network with its head inside. The fugitive was off any radar with multiple passports worldwide, and his DNA was not present in the database. Red tracks all the movements he made using the passports and leads the Task Force to the warehouse in Paris, which was the head office of the corporation. No arrests are made, as everybody, including the United States office head, manage to escape. The corporation is shut down. In the end, Reddington invites all the directors for a party to celebrate the closure of the corporation, one of the finest criminal organizations Red ever founded.
214	18	"Wormwood"	No. 182	Diego Klattenhoff	Sam Eisendrath	June 22, 2023	2.47
Reddington intervenes into a family dinner to settle down family feud between two clans. The oldest clan members from both sides die after drinking from separate wine bottles. Red hints the Task Force on Wormwood, a hired killer who uses a unique blood pressure toxin, which makes his victim unsustainable to the environment, and which may cause death due to innate diseases. Red forbids the remaining family members to leave the dining room; two of them disobey and die of the toxin. Another family member who was not present at the meeting also dies after touching the dish with the toxin, while the cooks reject any claims about their food. After the youngest clan members on both sides take the lead, Red's suspicion falls on the girlfriend of one of them, as he initially was not supposed to appear. It is soon justified as the girl confesses in hiring Wormwood and gives details on her order to Red and Herbie. The Task Force traces and arrests Wormwood who turns out to be a researcher at a pharmaceutical company. Red negotiates peace and union between rivalry clans, and leaves to see Agnes acting in Swan Lake before the effect of the toxin expires. In the meantime, Jonathan, whom Ressler oversaw and helped to get off drug addiction, is coerced to betray his sponsor and cooperate with Hudson on his mission to destroy the Task Force.
215	19	"Room 417"	None	Andrew McCarthy	James M. Feinberg	June 29, 2023	2.52
Reddington awakens the key Task Force members at 4am and reveals that the report concerning the country's nuclear abilities is to be stolen but gives no clues as to the thieves. Cooper sends Ressler and Dembe to the U.S. Capitol to secure it; there, they find out that the report has been taken by Friedman, its founder, to his home, where the theft is about to start. They contact Friedman via videophone and convince him to escape with the report until the onrush begins. Friedman leaves to his safe room where the thieves are unable to reach him and remains there until they retreat and the FBI arrives. The report is secured and one of Friedman's neighbours identifies one of the prowlers, a janitor in the Capitol. He is traced by video recordings to Room 417, a blind spot inside the building which has never been seen opened. When the door to the room is dissected, they all see secret cameras to track the U.S. Senate and U.S. House of Representatives members. It sends and receives messages through a fax machine but only connects with the mysterious Evelyn Corp. Ressler and Dembe invade its office building to find the central office of what is better known as The Blacklist and speak to Cooper about Red shutting down his operations. Cooper ties Red to both Evelyn and the Morgana Logistics Corporation, and Red later explains that things end and that he gives his assets to the FBI to make its operators retire. A talk between the Task Force members is overheard by Hudson who used Jonathan to upload tracking software to Ressler's phone. He learns about Cooper and Red being "partners in treason" and gets the only evidence he needed.
216	20	"Arthur Hudson"	None	Christine Moore	Sean Hennen	July 6, 2023	2.43
Hudson and Agent Nixon, who previously supported him in his investigation, reach out to Deputy Stromberg and talk him into meeting with Cooper and Panabaker to discuss the future of the Task Force. Cooper is ordered to visit Stromberg's office; shortly before, Ressler extracts information from Jonathan about Hudson eavesdropping on his phone. The recordings are then revealed by Nixon to Stromberg, Panabaker, and Cooper, and their competence is called into question. As Stromberg prepares to make a decision, Reddington uses Tadashi to hack their videoconference system and interfere with the meeting, stating that he is done apologizing. Nevertheless, Stromberg maintains his decision to start a formal investigation against Task Force and to shut it down permanently. The research group manage to determine the location of Reddington's plane in Maryland, where he had been waiting for Weecha to escape together. The FBI troops miss Red's plane as it explodes in the sky, while Red heads to Cooper in his car. After the Task Force members are released, Ressler visits Jonathan and finds him dead from an overdose. Stromberg orders Cooper to capture Red in order to reinstate the Task Force and preserve its members from prosecution. Red listens to it and offers Cooper to play tag. Prior to that, Red comes to see Heddie and Teddy to announce their retirement; he also visits Agnes to hand Elizabeth's badge over to her.
217	21	"Raymond Reddington: Pt. 1"	No. 00	Michael Caracciolo	Katie Bockes & Noah Schechter	July 13, 2023	2.81
The Task Force tries to prevent Reddington from leaving the city, facing not only his resistance but the suspicion rising among Hudson and Nixon. Another pressuring factor is an overall mental condition of the Task Force, as Ressler is morally distressed after Jonathan's death, while Cooper, Dembe, and Herbie have to choose sides. Meanwhile, Reddington visits Paula for a final farewell, and then uses his closest associates to bypass the FBI blocks and escape by sea. A clue leading to the Task Force's success is ditched when Hudson traces the warning call from Dembe to Red at the Maryland air station. Dembe is arrested, and he, Hudson, Nixon, and Ressler are conveyed to one of the black sites. Red reunites with Weecha, who tells him that Dembe is to be put behind bars. Red attacks the convoy to save Dembe, who refuses to follow Red. Hudson takes Nixon's gun and starts a crossfire seriously wounding Dembe in the neck. Red shoots Hudson in the head, knocks out Ressler, and rides away with Dembe.
218	22	"Raymond Reddington: Good Night"	No. 00	Michael Caracciolo	Lukas Reiter	July 13, 2023	2.64
Reddington and his squad deliver Dembe to the closest nursing home where Reddington's blood is transfused to Dembe after significant blood loss. After the transfusion is done, Reddington escapes to Andalusia, Spain, and recovers from blood loss at his mansion, suffering from his disease. Meanwhile, the investigation continues and Nixon is furious after Hudson's death. Herbie leaves the Task Force, deeming it a betrayal to his friend. Cooper and Siya head to Red's safehouse and find out that Red returned there to pick up Islero's skull. It appears that Red escaped to Spain to return Islero's skull to its homeland, the abandoned Miura ranch. Dembe awakens, and his condition improves. The court decides to relieve Dembe of duty after Red is captured. He gives details on Red's closest place to the ranch, the mansion, and Ressler is sent there. He arrives is too late; Red has already set off for the ranch, without the skull or any protection weapon. When he finally reaches the ranch, weakened after an arduous walk, an angry bull gores him, and there is nothing Ressler can do. Ressler picks up and dusts off his brown fedora hat and places it on the deceased Reddington's body.

== Production ==
=== Development ===
On February 22, 2022, James Spader announced the renewal of the series while making his appearance on The Tonight Show Starring Jimmy Fallon, with the NBC press release coming out shortly after.

On February 1, 2023, NBC officially announced that the season would serve as the last of the series. The same day, the poster and the trailer for the season were released. James Spader later revealed that the season was planned as final before the filming so as to finish the series properly. He also noted that for him the series would shift from its original conception if it went beyond this season.

=== Casting ===
On May 27, 2022, it was revealed that original cast member Amir Arison and another main actress, Laura Sohn, would depart the series following the finale of season 9. However, Arison stated that he and producers had been discussing his potential return to the series after The Kite Runner, the play he left the series for, ended its run on Broadway. Later, on October 6, he was invited to a 200th episode celebration, where in a series of posts he made another hint on his potential return. On February 22, 2023, an exclusive preview of the season premiere revealed the return of Arison to the series.

On August 9, 2022, it was revealed that casting was in process for the role of Siya Malik, an MI6 intelligence officer, who was a daughter to Meera Malik, the character introduced in the first season. On October 6 celebration, it was disclosed that Anya Banerjee had accepted the role.

In September 2022, Chin Han, Jonathan Holtzman and Teddy Coluca announced their respective returns. Deirdre Lovejoy and Sami Bray, who portrayed United States Senator Cynthia Panabaker and Agnes Keen in the ninth season, respectively, returned for the season. Stacy Keach, who previously played true criminal Robert Vesco, returned for four episodes of the season, although the storyline surrounding his character since season 6 was never resolved. Aaron Yoo was also previewed to return in the season, reprising his role from the third season.

On November 23, Chris McKenna wrote that he would be joining the series in an unknown recurring role, later revealed as one of Wujing's contract associates. On March 9, 2023, it was revealed that Alex Brightman would recur in the season as Red's forensic scientist.

=== Filming and release ===
Filming for the season started in September 2022. On October 6, filming for the 4th episode in the season, which is also 200th overall, was finished and celebrated with a special event at their set in Chelsea Piers, in which the Task Force headquarters are located. Filming for the final episode started on April 24, 2023 and concluded on May 1, with the closing ceremony held the same day. Filming for the series was finished hours before the beginning of 2023 writers strike which could have affected the show's further production.

With the release of NBC's fall schedule on May 26, 2022, it was revealed that the series would not air until midseason. Such a move had only been implemented to season 6 before. On November 7, it was set that the series would premiere on Sunday, February 26, 2023, on 8:00 p.m. However, due to the network's increased interest to Found, a new drama originally set to air following The Blacklist, subsequent corrections to the midseason schedule were performed by NBC. The season's regular timeslot would be 10:00 p.m., following season 5 of the revived Magnum P.I.. Starting with June 1, the series would be moving to Thursdays 8:00 p.m. timeslot while the series finale would air for two hours on July 13, 2023. Each episode would be available to stream on Peacock the next week after its initial release on NBC.

While announcing the renewal of the series in February 2022, Spader noted that a 22-episode season is expected to be produced, which was later confirmed by TVLine on November 18, 2022.

Spader was set for an appearance on The Tonight Show to promote the series on February 16, 2023, but failed to show up. Instead, the episode featured Travis Kelce, an American football player for the Kansas City Chiefs. He initially appeared on Late Night with Seth Meyers to promote the 200th episode of the series on March 15, 2023.

== Ratings ==
Viewership and ratings per episode of The Blacklist season 10
No.	Title	Air date	Rating (18–49)	Viewers (millions)
1	"The Night Owl"	February 26, 2023	0.2	2.32
2	"The Whaler"	March 5, 2023	0.1	1.76
3	"The Four Guns"	March 12, 2023	0.2	1.89
4	"The Hyena"	March 19, 2023	0.2	1.72
5	"The Dockery Affair"	March 26, 2023	0.2	1.78
6	"Dr. Laken Perillos: Conclusion"	April 2, 2023	0.2	2.06
7	"The Freelancer: Pt. 2"	April 9, 2023	0.2	2.12
8	"The Troll Farmer: Pt. 2"	April 16, 2023	0.2	1.73
9	"The Troll Farmer: Pt. 3"	April 23, 2023	0.2	1.69
10	"The Postman"	April 30, 2023	0.2	1.98
11	"The Man in the Hat"	May 7, 2023	0.2	1.70
12	"Dr. Michael Abani"	May 14, 2023	0.2	1.66
13	"The Sicilian Error of Color"	May 21, 2023	0.2	1.55
14	"The Nowhere Bride"	May 28, 2023	0.2	1.89
15	"The Hat Trick"	June 1, 2023	0.2	2.78
16	"Blair Foster"	June 1, 2023	0.2	2.27
17	"The Morgana Logistics Corporation"	June 8, 2023	0.2	2.45
18	"Wormwood"	June 22, 2023	0.2	2.47
19	"Room 417"	June 29, 2023	0.2	2.52
20	"Arthur Hudson"	July 6, 2023	0.2	2.43
21	"Raymond Reddington: Pt. 1"	July 13, 2023	0.3	2.81
22	"Raymond Reddington: Good Night"	July 13, 2023	0.2	2.64
