= The Blacklist season 8 =

Season of television series

The Blacklist
- Season 8
- No. of episodes: 22

Release
- Original network: NBC
- Original release: November 13, 2020 – June 23, 2021

Season chronology
- ← Previous; Season 7 Next → Season 9

The eighth season of the American crime thriller television series The Blacklist premiered on November 13, 2020 and ended on June 23, 2021.

The series was created by Jon Bokenkamp, and continues to be produced by Davis Entertainment, Universal Television and Sony Pictures Television, and executive produced by Jon Bokenkamp, John Davis, John Eisendrath, John Fox and Joe Carnahan. This is the last season to star Megan Boone.

== Premise ==
The eighth season follows Elizabeth Keen and her mother Katarina Rostova in their attempts to take down Reddington, who eventually kills Rostova. Elizabeth then goes on a vengeful crusade against Reddington, going rogue from the FBI and gathering her own resources and people to destroy him. She enters into an alliance with a powerful, dangerous criminal Neville Townsend, the author of Townsend's Directive. This alliance however, puts Elizabeth, Reddington, the FBI task force, and her attempts to discover more about her and Reddington's past in great jeopardy.

== Cast ==
=== Main ===
- James Spader as Raymond Reddington
- Megan Boone as Elizabeth Keen
- Diego Klattenhoff as Donald Ressler
- Harry Lennix as Harold Cooper
- Amir Arison as Aram Mojtabai
- Laura Sohn as Alina Park
- Hisham Tawfiq as Dembe Zuma

=== Recurring ===
- Laila Robins as Katarina Rostova/Tatiana Petrova
- Reg Rogers as Neville Townsend
- Ron Raines as Dominic Wilkinson
- Ginger Mason as Agnes Keen
- Kecia Lewis as Esi Jackson
- Drew Gehling as Skip Hadley
- Deirdre Lovejoy as Cynthia Panabaker
- LaChanze as Anne Foster
- David E. Harrison as Ivan Stepanov
- Lukas Hassel as Vandyke
- Christopher Gurr as Godwin Page
- Rana Roy as Priya Laghari

=== Guest stars ===
- Huey Lewis as himself
- Laverne Cox as Dr. Laken Perillos
- Susan Blommaert as Mr. Kaplan
- Lotte Verbeek as younger Katarina Rostova
- Dikran Tulaine as Maxwell Ruddiger
- Valarie Pettiford as Charlene Cooper
- Fisher Stevens as Marvin Gerard
- Brett Cullen as Frank Bloom / Ilya Kozlov
- Jonathan Holtzman as Chuck
- Dane West as The Storyteller

=== Tribute to ===
- Brian Dennehy as Dominic Wilkinson
- Clark Middleton as Glen Carter
- Tobias Core (art department / carpenter)

== Episodes ==
No. overall	No. in season	Title	Blacklist guide	Directed by	Written by	Original release date	US viewers (millions)
153	1	"Roanoke"	No. 139	Andrew McCarthy	Daniel Cerone	November 13, 2020	3.72
As Liz grows near the truth about Reddington, she begins to work with Katarina Rostova to plot against him. Meanwhile, Reddington assigns the task force to find a blacklister who is known for elaborate extractions.
154	2	"Katarina Rostova: Conclusion"	No. 3	Stephanie Marquardt	Lukas Reiter	November 20, 2020	3.53
The showdown between Katarina, Liz and Reddington comes to a head when Liz and Katarina abduct Liz’s ailing grandfather Dom to finally discover Reddington's true secrets. Meanwhile, Ressler and the rest of the task force grapple with the after effects of Liz's actions.
155	3	"16 Ounces"	None	Andrew McCarthy	John Eisendrath & Jon Bokenkamp & Lukas Reiter	January 22, 2021	3.27
Still grieving the loss of her mother, Liz resigns from the FBI and begins plotting her revenge on Reddington. Meanwhile, Cooper and the rest of the task force begin to track down Liz and receive information that she is planning to murder Reddington after he is hospitalized. After a failed attempt to kill Reddington, Liz reaches out to injured Ressler who, unlike Aram, did not plan to arrest her straight away. In the meantime, Cooper goes to meet Reddington who plans to put Liz on the blacklist.
156	4	"Elizabeth Keen"	No. 1	Cort Hessler	Sean Hennen	January 29, 2021	3.43
After being put on the blacklist by Reddington, Liz goes rogue and sets out to find all of Reddington's associates. She intends to persuade them to turn against him so that she can claim his criminal empire. Meanwhile, the task force hesitates to arrest Liz because of all the work she has done for the FBI.
157	5	"The Fribourg Confidence"	No. 140	Andrew McCarthy	Noah Schechter	February 5, 2021	3.44
Keen's hired crew steals an encrypted USB stick from Reddington's bank vault. Finding Keen becomes a bigger priority for the task force as The Freelancer, who was previously featured on the blacklist, is going to court with a newly appointed lawyer who has promised him early release. He requests that the charges against him be dropped on the grounds that Agent Keen had never testified in open court concerning her informant. The judge summons Keen but, despite finding her crew, the task force fails to find her. Cooper and Cynthia try to explain to the judge the reason why the informant's data cannot be made public, but the judge still orders the release of The Freelancer, who learns that it was Keen's plan to have him released. Later, Cooper finds the stolen USB stick has been planted in his car.
158	6	"The Wellstone Agency"	No. 127	Matthew McLoota	Kelli Johnson	February 12, 2021	3.44
Cooper asks Aram to go undercover as a sign language interpreter to an organization that offers illegal services to criminals. Meanwhile, Reddington receives devastating news that his associate Glen Carter has died from West Nile virus and organizes a memorial with the help of Dembe and Huey Lewis. After learning that her friend has died in a fire started by an arsonist, Alina takes matters into her own hands to track down the person responsible. This episode was dedicated to the memory of actor Clark Middleton, who died of complications from West Nile virus on October 4, 2020. Middleton's character, Glen Carter, died off-screen from the same disease in this episode.
159	7	"Chemical Mary"	No. 143	Christine Moore	Daniel Cerone	February 19, 2021	3.38
Reddington gets information that Keen might be using The Freelancer and a chemical weapons dealer, named Mary, for her plan against him. Reddington tracks down The Freelancer while the task force works to identify Mary. Using the information from The Freelancer, the task force helps a plane avoid a collision - a plane on which Mary had booked a seat. But to their surprise, it was all Keen's plan to let Reddington find The Freelancer and stop the plane collision while she abducted Mary at the airport. Meanwhile, Aram finds out that the USB stick Cooper found in his car is impossible to hack. Cooper obtains a fingerprint of Reddington's from a glass and successfully unlocks the USB stick.
160	8	"Ogden Greeley"	No. 40	Michael Caracciolo	Lukas Reiter	February 26, 2021	3.57
The Taskforce investigates the disappearance of a contractor. Meanwhile, Cooper receives an offer to fill a Senate seat. Later on, Cooper is forced to choose loyalty when intelligence are trying to track down Reddington. Also, Reddington receives unexpected romantic attention.
161	9	"The Cyranoid"	No. 35	Andrew McCarthy	Allison Glock-Cooper & T Cooper	March 5, 2021	3.22
The Taskforce is one step closer into tracking down Liz until they are thrown off when she decides to turn herself in. Instantly. Ressler discovers that the person is not Liz and is her doppelgänger, organized so the actual person is in a different undisclosed location. Meanwhile, Reddington scrambles to find Liz as she continues to collect all of his allies to turn against him.
162	10	"Dr. Laken Perillos"	No. 70	Phil Bertelsen	Aiah Samba	March 12, 2021	3.30
With the help of Chemical Mary, Liz reaches out to Mary's brother, Neville Townsend, who believes his family was killed by Reddington. Neville abducts Dembe to extract Reddington's secrets, using the services of Dr. Laken Perillos. Reddington offers himself in exchange for Dembe. Dembe escapes while Reddington surrenders to Dr. Perillos. Dembe manages to free Reddington and interrogates Dr. Perrillos regarding the whereabouts of Neville.
163	11	"Captain Kidd"	No. 96	Andrew McCarthy	Sam Christopher	March 26, 2021	3.29
The Task Force attempts to stop an abduction by searching for a teenage criminal who, according to Reddington, uses geocaching to hide illicit goods and facilitate transactions between warring criminal groups. Meanwhile Reddington tries to stop a plot against Cooper.
164	12	"Rakitin"	No. 28	Mahesh Pailoor	Lukas Reiter	April 2, 2021	3.29
Reddington's Russian partner instructs Rakitin to kill Cooper for digging into their plan. Reddington saves Cooper by having Rakitin arrested. Before Rakitin can reveal what Reddington is doing, agent Park, whom Reddington blackmails into helping him, unwittingly poisons and kills Rakitin. Reddington warns his Russian partner not to go behind his back again.
165	13	"Anne"	None	Andrew McCarthy	Sean Hennen	April 16, 2021	3.53
Reddington goes to visit his newly found love, Anne. Townsend tracks him down and to save Anne, Reddington surrenders at a police station so Anne's cop friend can safeguard them till more units arrive and save them from Townsend. Anne helps Reddington to get out of the police station, but later when he goes to Anne's place, he finds an unknown armed person there. Reddington believes the person holding Anne at gun point is Liz.
166	14	"Misère"	None	Christine Gee	Jon Bokenkamp & John Eisendrath	April 23, 2021	3.44
This episode recaps the previous ten episodes. Liz sets her sights on taking down Reddington once and for all. Liz begins her journey by teaming up with Reddington's worst enemy, Townsend. She begins to have doubts because she thinks that Townsend might be taking things too far after she gets wind of Reddington's whereabouts and his new love interest. At the same time Liz begins to experience visions of Mr. Kaplan guiding her to the path of Reddington's downfall.
167	15	"The Russian Knot"	None	Juan Avella	Katie Bockes	April 30, 2021	3.35
Liz gets a lead that Reddington uses a special type of cipher machine to communicate with his Russian handler that is put on display in a museum. Reddington tries to stop Liz from getting that machine by manipulating the task force to steal it. Later, Ressler helps Liz to decipher the communications of Reddington using that machine so Liz can prove to Townsend that Reddington is the Russian agent named N13.
168	16	"Nicholas Obenrader"	No. 133	Daniel Willis	Taylor Martin	May 7, 2021	3.20
Reddington helps the task force in arresting a criminal recruiter and supplier named Nicholas Obenrader. Reddington then acts as if he saved him from the task force and asks for a favor in return by making him recruit a thief named Priya, in Townsend's team, so she can spy for Reddington. In the meanwhile, Townsend taps Ressler's calls and, with the help of Liz, discovers that the task force has identified Reddington's alleged Russian handler, and before Liz or the task force can reach him, Townsend abducts him.
169	17	"Ivan Stepanov"	No. 5	Adam Weisinger	David Merritt	May 14, 2021	3.09
Townsend interrogates Reddington's alleged handler, Ivan Stepanov, who tells him some secret that Townsend turns against Keen. Priya and Reddington try to rescue Keen while the task force raids the office of Townsend in order to find him. Using leads from Townsend's staff, the task force storms the warehouse where a shootout between Reddington and Townsend is going on. This helps Reddington and Keen to escape, along with Ivan Stepanov.
170	18	"The Protean"	No. 36	Michael Caracciolo	Justine Neubarth	May 21, 2021	3.27
To get to Keen, Townsend hires the Protean, a killer who uses the identities of recently deceased people in order to avoid detection. The Protean tracks and kills Keen's team and then finds her half sister. He uses her to reach Keen, but Keen escapes. While escaping, the Protean shoots at Liz's car, hitting her half sister and ultimately killing her. Liz finds the Protean and while she is interrogating him the task force gets information about the Protean from Reddington, and they too reach them. During the arrest the Protean tries to snatch a gun from Liz, but Ressler shoots him and takes Keen into custody.
171	19	"Balthazar 'Bino' Baker"	No. 129	Christine Moore	Lukas Reiter	May 28, 2021	3.33
Townsend's associates attack Ressler and Keen's convoy. Ressler gets shot but Keen manages to take him to a site where Reddington has made arrangement for their transit, with the help of Bino who specializes in transporting through an underground network. When Bino learns that Townsend is searching for Keen he flips sides and invites Townsend to take her. Before Townsend arrives however, Reddington kills Bino to rescue Keen, while Townsend prepares to attack Bino's cafe in order to get to the two.
172	20	"Godwin Page"	No. 141	John Terlesky	Lukas Reiter	June 4, 2021	3.16
Using the underground network of Bino, Reddington and Liz escape Townsend's attack. Liz surrenders to the task force while Reddington gets his hands on an associate of Townsend's named Godwin Page. Reddington sends his team to break out Liz from FBI custody and in the meantime has a chip inserted into Page's neck to locate Townsend. But Liz takes the chip and helps Page to escape in exchange for a promise to persuade Townsend to leave her alone and use that chip to track and kill Reddington. Townsend agrees and while he tries to track down Reddington, he finds out that Reddington flew away with Liz. Reddington takes Liz to Latvia to reveal to her all the secrets that she had wanted to know about Reddington and her mother.
173	21	"Nachalo"	None	Kurt Kuenne	John Eisendrath & Jon Bokenkamp & Lukas Reiter	June 16, 2021	2.35
Liz is taken to the center of Red's operations where she learns the truth behind the creation of the imposter Raymond Reddington. In a series of flashbacks narrated by several figures from her past, Liz learns of her mother's life as a Russian spy and her relationship with the real Reddington which led to him fleeing with Liz and the Fulcrum after discovering the truth about Katarina's double life. Katarina went after Reddington to retrieve the Fulcrum and Liz shot her father to protect her mother. In the struggle a knocked over candle started a fire which resulted in Liz and Katarina both sustaining burns while getting out. Hunted by both the Cabal and the KGB, Katarina erased her daughter's memory of the fire and had Mr. Kaplan give Liz away for her own protection. Katarina and Ilya reveal that Dom told Liz most of the truth surrounding the creation of the fake Reddington and that he had only lied that Ilya was the imposter. The Katarina that Red killed was not actually Katarina Rostova, but an asset named Tatiana Petrova set up by Dom and Ilya to fake the real Katarina's death; however, Tatiana's husband was killed instead and when Red found out, he protected Tatiana. Tatiana eventually learned that Red knew where the real Katarina was and hunted him so that she could find Katarina and get her life back, using Liz to do it. After Dom told Tatiana how to do it, Red was forced to kill her. Katarina constructed the fake Reddington in order to protect Liz from her numerous enemies who would believe the legend that had been built around him with Ivan Stepanov stealing the Sikorsky Archive which became the backbone upon which Reddington's criminal empire was built. Before Liz can learn who Reddington really is or where Katarina is, Townsend attacks the bunker, seriously wounding Liz. Retreating into a safe room, Reddington activates a self-destruct device after apologizing for his role in the deaths of Townsend's family, killing Townsend and his men.
174	22	"Konets"	None	John Terlesky	Jon Bokenkamp & John Eisendrath	June 23, 2021	2.24
After killing Townsend and his men Reddington takes an injured Liz with him. While she recovers Reddington gives the Task Force details about those most likely to claim Townsend's criminal empire following his death. Reddington plans for Liz's future security and shares his idea with Liz: before Red's illness claims his life, Liz will kill him publicly and prove to the world that she is taking over his empire by force. Only then will she learn the secret of his true identity. Liz half-heartedly agrees, but finds it hard to pull the trigger when the time comes; one of Townsend's associates shoots her in the back. Reddington kills the associate before holding onto a dying Liz, while her life flashes before her eyes. Ressler and the task force arrive at the crime scene while Dembe takes Reddington and escapes.

== Production ==
=== Casting ===
- Laura Sohn, who had a recurring role in the previous season as Alina Park, had become a series regular.
- Ron Raines replaced Brian Dennehy as Dominic Wilkinson, due to the death of the latter prior to production.
- Clark Middleton, who portrayed Glen Carter, Reddington's tracker, died in October 2020.
- Megan Boone left the series after eight seasons. She was also absent from episodes 5 through 13; stand-ins were used when necessary.

=== Filming ===
Production for the eighth season began in September 2020 with full safety protocols in place amid the COVID-19 pandemic.

==== Departure of Jon Bokenkamp ====
Series creator Jon Bokenkamp announced in June 2021 to leave the series after eight seasons to move on new projects.

== Ratings ==
Viewership and ratings per episode of The Blacklist season 8
No.	Title	Air date	Rating (18–49)	Viewers (millions)	DVR (18–49)	DVR viewers (millions)	Total (18–49)	Total viewers (millions)
1	"Roanoke (No. 139)"	November 13, 2020	0.4	3.72	0.4	2.30	0.8	6.03
2	"Katarina Rostova: Conclusion (No. 3)"	November 20, 2020	0.4	3.53	—N/a	—N/a	—N/a	—N/a
3	"16 Ounces"	January 22, 2021	0.4	3.27	—N/a	—N/a	—N/a	—N/a
4	"Elizabeth Keen (No. 1)"	January 29, 2021	0.4	3.43	—N/a	—N/a	—N/a	—N/a
5	"The Fribourg Confidence (No. 140)"	February 5, 2021	0.4	3.44	—N/a	—N/a	—N/a	—N/a
6	"The Wellstone Agency (No. 127)"	February 12, 2021	0.4	3.44	0.4	2.25	0.8	5.69
7	"Chemical Mary (No. 143)"	February 19, 2021	0.4	3.38	0.4	2.21	0.7	5.59
8	"Ogden Greeley (No. 40)"	February 26, 2021	0.3	3.57	0.4	2.05	0.7	5.62
9	"The Cyranoid (No. 35)"	March 5, 2021	0.4	3.22	0.3	2.18	0.7	5.41
10	"Dr. Laken Perillos (No. 70)"	March 12, 2021	0.4	3.30	0.3	2.01	0.7	5.30
11	"Captain Kidd (No. 96)"	March 26, 2021	0.3	3.29	—N/a	—N/a	—N/a	—N/a
12	"Rakitin (No. 28)"	April 2, 2021	0.4	3.29	—N/a	—N/a	—N/a	—N/a
13	"Anne"	April 16, 2021	0.4	3.53	0.2	1.78	0.6	5.31
14	"Misere"	April 23, 2021	0.4	3.44	0.3	1.93	0.7	5.37
15	"The Russian Knot"	April 30, 2021	0.4	3.35	0.3	2.07	0.7	5.41
16	"Nicholas Obenrader (No. 133)"	May 7, 2021	0.4	3.20	0.3	2.07	0.7	5.27
17	"Ivan Stepanov (No. 5)"	May 14, 2021	0.4	3.09	0.3	1.90	0.7	4.99
18	"The Protean (No. 36)"	May 21, 2021	0.4	3.27	0.3	2.01	0.7	5.28
19	"Balthazar "Bino" Baker (No. 129)"	May 28, 2021	0.4	3.33	0.3	1.96	0.7	5.29
20	"Godwin Page (No. 141)"	June 4, 2021	0.3	3.16	0.3	1.98	0.6	5.13
21	"Nachalo"	June 16, 2021	0.3	2.35	0.3	2.46	0.6	4.81
22	"Konets"	June 23, 2021	0.2	2.24	0.3	2.35	0.5	4.58
