= Raymond Reddington (The Blacklist episode) =

- The Blacklist episodes
- Episode nos.: Season 10; Episodes 21–22
- Directed by: Michael Caracciolo (Parts 1 & 2)
- Written by: Katie Bockes (Part 1); Noah Schechter (Part 1); Lukas Reiter (Part 2)
- Production codes: 1021 & 1022
- Original air date: July 13, 2023

Guest appearances
- Both parts: Alex Brightman as Herbie Hambright; Jake Silbermann as Agent Ishwood; Derrick Williams as Jordan Nixon; Jonathan Holtzman as Chuck; Part 1: Toby Leonard Moore as Arthur Hudson; Marylouise Burke as Paula Carter; Diany Rodriguez as Weecha Xiu; Part 2: Sami Bray as Agnes Keen

Episode chronology
← Previous "Arthur Hudson"	Next → —
- The Blacklist season 10

"Raymond Reddington" is the two-part series finale of the American crime drama television series The Blacklist. It comprises the 21st and 22nd episodes of the tenth season, and the 217th and 218th episodes overall. The episodes aired on NBC on July 13, 2023, in a special two-hour time slot. The first part was written by Katie Bockes and Noah Schechter, while the second, subtitled "Good Night", was written by executive producer Lukas Reiter, who had been on the series since its premiere, and both parts were directed by long-time crew member Michael Caracciolo.

The story follows series protagonist Raymond Reddington (James Spader), the most-wanted American criminal, as he escapes to Spain in order to avoid capture after his arcane task force received orders to arrest him following the investigation launched by congressman Arthur Hudson (Toby Leonard Moore). The task force reluctantly cooperates with Hudson amid his paranoiac sense of betrayal, which leads to his arrest of agent Dembe Zuma (Hisham Tawfiq). Reddington rescues Zuma as he is convoyed to the federal building and disappears. After residing in his mansion in Andalusia, Reddington takes a walk along the fields and ultimately dies from a bull. The number of Reddington on his Blacklist is 0, stylized as 00.

The Blacklist was renewed for a tenth season in February 2022. In March 2022, showrunner John Eisendrath extended his deal with Sony Pictures Television. In May 2022, NBC unveiled its 2022–2023 prime-time schedule, pushing the series to mid-season. On February 1, 2023, it was revealed that the tenth season would be the series' last. In May 2023, NBC set July 13, 2023 as the release date for the finale. The episodes had the season's highest viewership ratings.

== Plot ==
=== Part 1 ===
Dembe Zuma (Tawfiq) receives a call from Raymond Reddington (Spader) at the mosque. In the call, Reddington tells him off for making a warning call to him at the end of previous episode, and asks for "no more favors" toward him. The call is traced by the FBI and Reddington's former task force located at the Post Office headquarters and tied to a Nissan Leaf by agent Jordan Nixon (Derrick Williams). The landmarks of the car are transmitted to field officers; by that time, Reddington, his bodyguard Chuck (Jonathan Holtzman), and his external services spread out identical cars with doppelgängers in them. Reddington ditches his car and visits his friend Paula (Marylouise Burke). At her house, he makes up his backup plan and delivers a farewell to Paula, and then leaves before Dembe and his fellow agent Siya Malik (Anya Banerjee) burst in there. A worried Paula gives the destination Reddington was making his way, a house beyond the FBI barricades, and Dembe and Siya follow her prompt. When they arrive, the house has already been put on fire by Reddington's affiliate. Reddington and Chuck, now moving in a fire lorry, bypass the block posts before Dembe realizes the aim behind the staging and gives respective orders. Reddington switches the fire engine to a taxi, recalls Chuck and his crew, and makes his way to the closest port.

At the Post Office, congressman Hudson (Moore) supervises the task force in firm belief that they would help Reddington at chance, his eyes focused on Zuma. He constantly blames its members for any failure they have. Donald Ressler (Diego Klattenhoff), angry over Hudson causing his friend's death, breaks down and punches Hudson. Harold Cooper (Harry Lennix) defuses the situation and calls a meeting with Ressler, Zuma, and other principal members of the group. He encourages his squad by telling them about a possible tribunal on themselves if not Reddington. Meanwhile, Hudson and Nixon determine the warning call to Reddington was made from the phone of Agent Ishwood (Jake Silbermann) and then confront and interrogate him. Looking at Reddington's movement over the past hours, Dembe suggests he might be heading to the port and leaves to examine possibilities with Nixon. Hudson fiercely points on Ishwood for aiding Reddington until Cooper offers to look through camera recordings at the moment the call was made. The video shows Dembe sneaking Ishwood's phone to call Reddington. Fuming over the proven betrayal, Hudson orders the team to arrest Dembe and transfer him to federal prison due to a lack of trust in the Post Office. He, Ishwood, and Ressler join Dembe and Nixon and form a convoy.

"Killing a man is rather different than convicting him of a capital offence."

— Raymond Reddington

Reddington escapes further pursuit by sea and reunites with a distressed Weecha (Diany Rodriguez) who tells him about Dembe's arrest. Thus, Reddington decides to save Dembe from prosecution. Together with Chuck and his forces, he overthrows the convoy while moving. Nixon and Ishwood are incapacitated while Dembe gets help from Reddington but refuses to leave with him, and Hudson awakens and takes Nixon's shotgun. Afraid and hesitating, he points it on Dembe. Ressler also gets out of the car and points his gun on Chuck. Dembe tries to mediate the situation but a dissuaded Hudson would not listen. A sudden voice from the background makes Hudson shoot, and the bullet goes into Dembe's neck. Reddington shoots Hudson dead and fusillades the remaining bullets into Ressler's flak jacket to incapacitate him while not causing serious injury or death. He takes a wounded Dembe and rushes away in sight of the awakened Ishwood.

=== Part 2: "Good Night" ===
Reddington, Chuck, and his crew search for a hospital across the area but are too far away. Therefore, they deliver a heavily injured Dembe to the closest nursing home. Reddington recklessly commands its staff to transfuse his blood to Dembe to save him from blood loss. Although his blood was compatible to Dembe's, the impact on Reddington's own health was untraceable, and Reddington did not take it into account. Meanwhile, at the crossfire scene, Cooper joins agent Ishwood, an insignificantly injured Ressler, and a fierce Nixon to discuss their next steps to locate Reddington and Dembe. Nixon accuses Ressler of pandering Reddington as his former ally and being responsible for Hudson's death. As a witness, Ishwood testifies and assures Ressler was on his side. Nixon unleashes his anger on Ressler, Dembe, and mostly Reddington, threatening to murder Reddington in cold blood. At the Post Office headquarters, Reddington's associate working for the Task Force Herbie Hambright (Alex Brightman) determines the nursing home where Dembe was. Cooper and the others follow the lead to find an unconscious Dembe but no sign of Reddington. Meanwhile, Herbie pulls himself together and leaves Post Office after finding himself unable to go against Reddington. Siya Malik looks into the departures from nearby airports while Cooper chooses to visit the Bathhouse, Reddington's shelter in New York, to see whether he had taken something with him. They seemingly find everything on its places, except the skull of Islero, a bull notable for goring Manolete; the skull itself appeared in multiple episodes of the season. Having listened to one of Reddington's monologues before, Siya concludes he was going to the Miura ranch in Andalusia to bury it.

In a remote village near Seville, Reddington wakes up in a mansion belonging to his affiliate Angela (Paulina Gálvez) who now served as his caretaker. His health was deteriorating, up to hemoptysis. He has a recreational walk to the town where he orders a delivery of a watermelon to the mansion. Meanwhile, Dembe comes round and directs Cooper to the mansion. Ressler is sent there immediately, and Cooper later pays Dembe a visit. Surprisingly for both, Reddington makes a call to them. After a friendly conversation, he puts down and gets through to Cooper's foster daughter Agnes (Sami Bray). They have a small talk. Meanwhile, Ressler is already at the mansion, and he asks Angela to search for Reddington. He is then assured that the place is empty and sent to the village to ask the locals. After he leaves, Angela informs Reddington, who rested at the rear house, about the agent. He quickly identifies Ressler. At the nursing home, Cooper visits Dembe once again to deliver the decision of the attorney general to relieve him of duty without charges. Dembe positively accepts the news and then tearfully narrates a monologue about Reddington. He is described as a person who thinks death is insignificant as inevitable but who would "rage against the dying of the light", multiply referring to the villanelle by Dylan Thomas, joyful and committed.

Still in poor physical condition, Reddington considers himself capable of reaching the Miura ranch by foot and sets off for a long and grueling walk, leaving behind Angela, Islero's skull, and any protection weapon. Ressler gets ahold of the rear extension of Reddington's mansion after talking to the watermelon delivery woman. He rushes to find a distracted Angela who spills Reddington's next destination. Reddington reaches the now abandoned ranch, out of water and breath, and turns back to see a scruffy bull observing him. The bull then starts to charge in slow motion while Reddington stands still. When Ressler, taking a helicopter, locates Reddington from above and lands, there is nothing to be done. Ressler looks at Reddington's distorted body, then at the bull, dials Cooper, and says: "I've got him." He then picks up and dusts off Reddington's brown fedora and places it on his body as the camera zooms out from the sky, ending the series.

== Production ==
On February 22, 2022, Spader announced the renewal of the series for the tenth season. On February 1, 2023, NBC announced a final season of the drama. John Eisendrath, one of its creators and executive producers, said that he "would like to thank everyone at NBC and Sony, our extraordinary crew, our inventive writers and producers, and our remarkable cast." Later in February 2023, Spader commented that they "had never had a clear paradigm of the show", and that the season was initially planned as final to avoid turning it into "less recognizable". The release date for the final episode was not stated at that moment.

On May 29, 2023, NBC set the airdate for a double series finale episode, along with other schedule changes for the season; the episodes premiered on July 13, 2023. The negotiations with NBC on the dates were conducted by Spader himself, as he was the only executive producer available amidst the 2023 Writers Guild of America strike. The first promo with a pack of promotional images was released on July 7, 2023. Another promo was released via Entertainment Tonight on July 11, 2023. The third promo featuring Spader alongside Marylouise Burke was published by Collider the next day.

The episodes were filmed in Nyack, New York, from April 24 to May 1 and was finished before the strike began. Some scenes from the final episode were also filmed in Spain by Fresco Film Services, taking money from the governmental Spanish Tax Credit.

== Reception ==
=== Ratings ===
In its original broadcast, the first part was viewed by approximately 2.81 million viewers and became the season's most viewed episode, also receiving a 0.3 18–49 rating. The second part averaged a total of 2.64 million viewers and was only behind the first part and "The Hat Trick" in terms of viewership, and received a 0.22 rating.

=== Critical response ===
The first episode was described as "a cat-and-mouse game". James Croot of Stuff felt the ending was an "abrupt damp squib of a dénouement" and criticized the episodes' "cryptic" conversations. Denis Kimathi of TV Fanatic said the finale was like a "new lease on life" for the series, but was "run over" closer to the end, and considered its unsatisfying ending to be the result of combining two major storylines in one season. Writing for CNN Entertainment, Brian Lowry praised Spader's performance and considered the ending "worthy" while adding that the series as a whole "did not know when to quit" and should have had Reddington "rest in peace years ago". The lack of answers for the questions surrounding the series, such as the fate of the task force after Reddington's death, his real identity, and the reason for his relationship with Elizabeth Keen, Megan Boone's character who departed after season 8, was among the discussed drawbacks.
