= Do not go gentle into that good night =

Poem by Dylan Thomas

"Do not go gentle into that good night" is a poem in the form of a villanelle by Welsh poet Dylan Thomas (1914–1953), and is one of his best-known works. Though first published in the journal Botteghe Oscure in 1951, Thomas wrote the poem in 1947 while visiting Florence with his family. The poem was subsequently included, alongside other works by Thomas, in In Country Sleep, and Other Poems (New Directions, 1952) and Collected Poems, 1934–1952 (Dent, 1952). The poem entered the public domain in all countries outside the United States on 1 January 2024.

It has been suggested that the poem was written for Thomas's dying father, although he did not die until just before Christmas in 1952. It has no title other than its first line, "Do not go gentle into that good night", a line that appears as a refrain throughout the poem along with its other refrain, "Rage, rage against the dying of the light".

== Poem ==
Do not go gentle into that good night,
Old age should burn and rave at close of day;
Rage, rage against the dying of the light.

Though wise men at their end know dark is right,
Because their words had forked no lightning they
Do not go gentle into that good night.

Good men, the last wave by, crying how bright
Their frail deeds might have danced in a green bay,
Rage, rage against the dying of the light.

Wild men who caught and sang the sun in flight,
And learn, too late, they grieved it on its way,
Do not go gentle into that good night.

Grave men, near death, who see with blinding sight
Blind eyes could blaze like meteors and be gay,
Rage, rage against the dying of the light.

And you, my father, there on the sad height,
Curse, bless, me now with your fierce tears, I pray.
Do not go gentle into that good night.
Rage, rage against the dying of the light.

== Form ==
The villanelle consists of five stanzas of three lines (tercets) followed by a single stanza of four lines (a quatrain) for a total of nineteen lines. It is structured by two repeating rhymes and two refrains: the first line of the first stanza serves as the last line of the second and fourth stanzas, and the third line of the first stanza serves as the last line of the third and fifth stanzas.

== Analysis ==
=== Summary ===
In the first stanza, the speaker encourages his father not to "go gentle into that good night" but rather to "rage, rage against the dying of the light." Then, in the subsequent stanzas, he proceeds to list all manner of men, using terms such as "wise", "good", "wild", and "grave" as descriptors, who, in their own respective ways, embody the refrains of the poem. In the final stanza, the speaker implores his father, whom he observes upon a "sad height", begging him to "Curse, bless, me now with your fierce tears", and reiterates the refrains once more.

=== Literary opinion ===
While this poem has inspired a significant amount of unique discussion and analysis from such critics as Seamus Heaney, Jonathan Westphal, and Walford Davies, some interpretations of the poem's meaning are under general consensus. "This is obviously a threshold poem about death", Heaney writes, and Westphal agrees, noting that "[Thomas] is advocating active resistance to death." Heaney thinks that the poem's structure as a villanelle "[turns] upon itself, advancing and retiring to and from a resolution" in order to convey "a vivid figure of the union of opposites" that encapsulates "the balance between natural grief and the recognition of necessity which pervades the poem as a whole."

Westphal writes that the "sad height" Thomas refers to in line 16 is "of particular importance and interest in appreciating the poem as a whole." He asserts that it was not a literal structure, such as a bier, not only because of the literal fact that Thomas' father died after the poem's publication, but also because "it would be pointless for Thomas to advise his father not to 'go gentle' if he were already dead ..." Instead, he thinks that Thomas' phrase refers to "a metaphorical plateau of aloneness and loneliness before death". In his 2014 "Writers of Wales" biography of Thomas, Davies disagrees, instead believing that the imagery is more allusive in nature, and that it "clearly evokes both King Lear on the heath and Gloucester thinking he is at Dover Cliff."

== Use and references in other works ==
Igor Stravinsky's composition In Memoriam Dylan Thomas is a setting of the full text of the poem. Other composers who have set the poem to music include Vincent Persichetti (1976) Elliot del Borgo (1979), John Cale (1989, on Words for the Dying) and Janet Owen Thomas (1999, in the final movement of her Under the Skin).

Electronic musician Richard Burmer composed "Do Not Go Gentle Into That Good Night" for his last album, Treasures of the Saints (1992), which was accompanied by a recording of Thomas reading the poem.

Additionally, lines from the poem are featured in the song "Intro" from G-Eazy's album When It's Dark Out (2015).

The poem is also read in full on Iggy Pop’s album Free (2019).

=== Art ===
"Do not go gentle into that good night" was the inspiration for two paintings by Swansea-born painter and printmaker Ceri Richards, who created them in 1956, and 1965.

=== Literature ===
The poem influenced the writing of Mircea Cărtărescu's novel Solenoid (2015).

The poem is referenced in the title of Derek Landy's "Skulduggery Pleasant: The Dying of the Light", the ninth installment of the Young Adult fantasy series Skulduggery Pleasant.

The poem is referenced in writing in Yi Shi Si Zhou's "Little Mushroom: Judgement Day", the first installment of the danmei Science Fiction duology Little Mushroom.

=== Film ===
The poem is prominently referenced in Interstellar (2014), where the poem is used repeatedly by Michael Caine's character John Brand, as well as by several other supporting characters.

It also features in the 1986 comedy Back to School where Thornton Melon, played by Rodney Dangerfield, is required to recite the poem during an examination.

President Thomas Whitmore, in Independence Day (1996 film): Facing an alien invasion, he delivers a unifying, patriotic call-to-action declaring that "We will not go quietly into the night!"

Also featured in the movie Dangerous Minds in 1995: In the film the teacher and ex-marine Louanne Johnson uses the poem as a lecture and lesson to a group of underprivileged students and inspires poetry.

=== Television ===
The poem was performed by British comedian Diane Morgan (who regularly interrupted it with fart noises) for a comedy challenge in Season 2 of the Amazon Prime Video show Last One Laughing UK.

The title of Season 11, Episode 6 of Shameless, "Do Not Go Gentle Into That Good....Eh, Screw It", references the poem.

Season 10, Episode 22 of Blacklist -the program's final episode- memorably employs the poem. Dembe, a central character, references the poem while speaking of Raymond Reddington, who will soon die.

=== Video games ===
Version 2.2 of Zenless Zone Zero by Mihoyo/HoYoverse is named after the poem. Version 3.3 of Honkai: Star Rail, another game developed by the same company, added an achievement named "Rage Against the Dying Light".

Following the End of Service announcement for Destiny 2 on May 21st 2026, the poem became a saying among players as a rallying cry to show support for the game and its universe due to players wielding magical powers in game referred to as "The Light." The poem was further pushed by the Principal Community Manager of Bungie, dmg04, by tweeting the poem after the EoS announcement.
