= The Blacklist season 6 =

Season of television series

The Blacklist
- Season 6
- No. of episodes: 22

Release
- Original network: NBC
- Original release: January 3 – May 17, 2019

Season chronology
- ← Previous; Season 5 Next → Season 7

The sixth season of the American crime thriller television series The Blacklist premiered on NBC on Thursday, January 3, 2019 at 10:00 PM, followed by its time slot premiere on Friday, January 4 at 9:00 PM. The season contained 22 episodes and concluded on May 17 the same year. Early episode reviews noted that the sixth season was more serialized than previous ones, focusing more on the stories of its main characters and the emotional fallout of recent events.

The series continues to be produced by Davis Entertainment, Universal Television and Sony Pictures Television, and executive produced by Jon Bokenkamp, John Davis, John Eisendrath, John Fox, and Joe Carnahan.

== Overview ==
The sixth season builds on the story line from the fifth season finale, which showed that the real Raymond Reddington was dead and that the man claiming to be him (James Spader) was an impostor. The two-part season premiere explored two characters crucial to this narrative: Dr. Hans Koehler (Kenneth Tigar), a master of facial reconstruction, and Bastien Moreau or the Corsican (Christopher Lambert). Elizabeth Keen begins digging into the mysteries of Reddington's lie. The season begins to unravel the mystery of who the fake Reddington really is and whether the remains of the real Reddington found in Season 5 are those of Keen's real father. During the season, Raymond, Elizabeth and the FBI task force are faced with a conspiracy that threatens to destroy them. A new series antagonist is U.S. Assistant Attorney General and presidential adviser Anna McMahon (Jennifer Ferrin), the major architect of the conspiracy who works with another in a nefarious criminal scheme.

== Cast ==
=== Main cast ===
- James Spader as Raymond "Red" Reddington
- Megan Boone as Elizabeth Keen
- Diego Klattenhoff as Donald Ressler
- Harry Lennix as Harold Cooper
- Amir Arison as Aram Mojtabai
- Mozhan Marnò as Samar Navabi
- Hisham Tawfiq as Dembe Zuma

=== Recurring ===
- Fiona Dourif as Jennifer Reddington/Lillian Roth, Red's daughter and Liz's ally in her pursuit of the truth about Red
- Christopher Lambert as Bastien Moreau, AKA The Corsican, a nationalist assassin obsessed with keeping his true identity secret
- Dikran Tulaine as Max, a skilled bomb maker and longtime acquaintance of Red's
- Becky Ann Baker as Roberta Wilkins, a Federal judge overseeing Red's trial
- Ken Leung as Michael Sima, an Assistant U. S. Attorney prosecuting Red
- Mike Boland as Jim Macatee, the warden of the Federal prison where Red is being held
- Coy Stewart as Vontae Jones, a young prison inmate befriended by Red
- Benito Martinez as Robert Diaz, the corrupt President of the United States
- Jennifer Ferrin as Anna McMahon, a United States President's advisor running a criminal conspiracy with Robert Diaz
- Deirdre Lovejoy as Cynthia Panabaker, the White House Counsel
- Clark Middleton as Glen Carter, a DMV employee who occasionally assists Red
- Oded Fehr as Levi Shur, a Mossad agent and the former partner of Samar Navabi
- Javier Molina as Vega Montero, a Federal prison inmate who assists Red
- Laila Robins as Katarina Rostova
- Jonathan Holtzman as Chuck
- Gary Perez as Federal Warden

== Episodes ==
No. overall	No. in season	Title	Blacklist guide	Directed by	Written by	Original release date	US viewers (millions)
112	1	"Dr. Hans Koehler"	No. 33	Bill Roe	Jon Bokenkamp & John Eisendrath	January 3, 2019	4.15
Red tips off the Task Force that Dr. Hans Koehler, a plastic surgeon responsible for making many criminals unrecognizable to international governments, has resurfaced. Red and the Task Force separately attempt to track down Dr. Koehler while Liz and Jennifer, Reddington's daughter revealed in the last season, travel to their old house to find more info on the imposter Reddington. Red reaches Dr. Koehler first but finds him mortally wounded after his unknown patient shot him to prevent his true identity from being discovered. Dr. Koehler tells Red the location of his patient files, which Red retrieves and provides to the Task Force minus his own file. The Task Force identifies the patient as Bastien Moreau, a nationalist assassin, but he evades capture. Meanwhile, Samar is showing signs of memory loss after her near drowning.
113	2	"The Corsican"	No. 20	Kurt Kuenne	John Eisendrath & Jon Bokenkamp	January 4, 2019	3.91
The Task Force continues to search for Bastien Moreau, AKA The Corsican, a blacklister currently in the employ of an unknown woman. Moreau has had his face surgically altered to resemble a key diplomatic courier in order to plant a bomb at the United Nations. Liz and Jennifer are looking into Dr. Koehler's patient files in an attempt to find Red's true identity. Moreau successfully smuggles the bomb into the UN building and escapes, but the Task Force intervenes before the bomb can be triggered, and Red has his bombmaker Max defuse the bomb. Afterwards, Reddington gets arrested in New York after 30 years on the run and faces the death penalty. Liz reveals to Jennifer that she is responsible for the tip that led to Red's arrest in an effort to keep Red from undermining their effort to discover his true identity.
114	3	"The Pharmacist"	No. 124	Daniel Willis	Lukas Reiter	January 11, 2019	3.66
Reddington is to be prosecuted for a number of crimes. The Attorney General decides the immunity agreement should be voided and its existence kept secret, but Harold Cooper appears in court to testify about it. The judge rules the immunity agreement is valid, but the illegal weapon found on Reddington when he was arrested could result in the agreement being invalidated. In the meantime, the Task Force goes after Dr. Spalding Stark, a bio-scientist performing unauthorized human trials for an experimental treatment for MCDD that resulted in the deaths of numerous patients. The Task Force discovers that Spalding's effective cure was being sabotaged by his partner Ethan Webb, who is secretly working for a rival firm. The Task Force raids the site of Stark's latest trial and Ressler captures Webb. Samar is showing increasing signs of brain damage.
115	4	"The Pawnbrokers"	No. 146/147	Lin Oeding	Carla Kettner	January 18, 2019	4.04
Reddington adjusts to his new life in prison. He immediately creates enemies with some of the inmates, but befriends a young inmate named Vontae Jones. Red and Vontae figure out a way to transmit a message to Dembe to get help. Red survives an assassination attempt by one of the prisoners. Meanwhile, Samar goes undercover to buy a secret NSA encryption algorithm from the Pawnbrokers, a married couple who front money for other criminals and sell confidential information. Chinese intelligence operatives, having been tipped off by a rogue NSA employee, steal the algorithm from the Pawnbrokers before the sale goes down. Samar and Ressler manage to intercept the operatives before they can reach their embassy and take the algorithm. Also, Liz and Jennifer might have caught a lead from the patient files in investigating Reddington’s past.
116	5	"Alter Ego"	No. 131	John Terlesky	Sean Hennen & Lukas Reiter	February 1, 2019	3.68
Reddington challenges the legitimacy of the search that led to the discovery of his gun and his subsequent arrest in court. The judge denies him request to listen to a recording of the call that tipped off the police and rules it was a valid search; therefore, the gun would be admitted as evidence to void his immunity agreement. He vows to listen to the recording and find out who betrayed him. Meanwhile, FBI Task Force investigates the certification of heritage from late millionaire to the suspicious person who might be involved in the millionaire's murder.
117	6	"The Ethicist"	No. 91	Bill Roe	Taylor Martin	February 8, 2019	4.24
Liz secretly asks the task force to track down a blacklister that holds some secrets to Reddington's past. Meanwhile, Reddington requests the court for a psychiatric evaluation in order to be declared legally sane for his upcoming trial.
118	7	"General Shiro"	No. 116	Kurt Kuenne	Teleplay by : Jonathan Shapiro; Story by : Jonathan Shapiro & Lukas Reiter	February 15, 2019	3.59
Reddington continues to pull out all stops to keep his trial from happening while jury selection has begun. Meanwhile, the task force investigates a blacklister who is killing people by infecting them with lethally altered insects crawling in the insides of their victims.
119	8	"Marko Jankowics"	No. 58	Bill Roe	Lukas Reiter	February 22, 2019	4.34
The task force tracks down a blacklister who is a drug kingpin and is using women as drug mules by putting the drug in their stomachs so they can pass as pregnant. Meanwhile, Liz runs into a road block while searching for a woman who has secrets about Reddington. Reddington mediates between two rival gangs in prison.
120	9	"Minister D"	No. 99	Michael Caracciolo	Noah Schechter & Jonathan Shapiro	February 22, 2019	3.97
While Reddington's trial for treason begins, Liz and the task force search for a blacklister who holds secrets that would clear Reddington's name. Dembe searches for the person responsible for turning Reddington in.
121	10	"The Cryptobanker"	No. 160	Terrence O'Hara	Kelli Johnson	March 8, 2019	3.82
As Reddington's trial begins, the prosecutors ask for the task force to be discovered to the jury and ask them to testify. To Reddington's dismay, he is forced to plead guilty. He cleverly tries to escape from prison as a last desperate chance to freedom. Meanwhile, the task force look for a blacklister who handles illegal transactions of cryptocurrency.
122	11	"Bastien Moreau"	No. 20	Andrew McCarthy	Jon Bokenkamp & John Eisendrath	March 15, 2019	3.36
The task force races against the clock to find evidence of a conspiracy against America which Reddington claims exists, hoping he will be granted clemency and not be executed. Aram is concerned for Samar’s health when he finds that she’s seeing a speech therapist.
123	12	"Bastien Moreau: Conclusion"	No. 20	Christine Gee	John Eisendrath & Jon Bokenkamp & Lukas Reiter	March 22, 2019	4.18
As Reddington is about to be executed, Cooper appeals to the President of the United States to stop the execution so Reddington can help track down the assassin responsible for the death of the President of Germany's Federal Intelligence Service. If they succeed, Reddington's immunity agreement would be restored. Meanwhile, Aram advises Samar to tell Cooper about her illness.
124	13	"Robert Vesco"	No. 9	Adam Weisinger	Michael Perri	March 29, 2019	4.33
His immunity agreement being restored, Reddington tracks down his former mentor, who swindled him out of a massive amount of money, and forces him to help him find a long-hidden pirate treasure. Samar and Aram struggle to cope with her medical problems.
125	14	"The Osterman Umbrella Company"	No. 6	Bill Roe	Sean Hennen	March 29, 2019	4.00
Learning of Samar's illness, the Mossad send assassins after her as they consider her a liability, forcing her and Aram to go on the run. With Reddington's help, Samar flees the country to an unknown location, leaving a heartbroken Aram behind for his own safety.
126	15	"Olivia Olson"	No. 115	Stephanie Marquardt	Lukas Reiter	April 5, 2019	3.62
The task force tracks down a blacklister who specializes in hostile takeovers and helps both criminal groups and legally-owned businesses widen their operations. This person might have a connection to the presidential advisor who is leading the taskforce. Meanwhile, Aram adjusts to life without Samar and begins a plan to retaliate against Reddington.
127	16	"Lady Luck"	No. 69	Bill Roe	T Cooper & Allison Glock-Cooper	April 12, 2019	3.57
The task force investigate a blacklister who offers gamblers a positive financial future at a deceptively high price. Ressler looks into Liz's mother's whereabouts. Reddington confronts his associates one by one to see who turned him in to the police.
128	17	"The Third Estate"	No. 136	Andrew McCarthy	Katie Bockes	April 19, 2019	4.04
The task force is put on high alert when tracking down an anti-capitalist terrorist group who kidnap and torture children of the one percent. Meanwhile, Ressler continues to dig deeper into the life of Liz's mother. As Reddington continues to track down the person responsible for turning him in to the police, Dembe suggests to Liz that she should come clean about her betrayal.
129	18	"The Brockton College Killer"	No. 92	Lisa Robinson	Sam Christopher	April 26, 2019	4.09
The task force investigates a copycat serial killer whose murders are apparently intended to exonerate the original by providing him with an alibi. Liz confesses her secret to Reddington and learns her grandfather's identity. Dembe parts ways with Reddington.
130	19	"Rassvet"	None	John Terlesky	Sean Hennen	April 26, 2019	3.95
Dom tells Liz the truth behind her mother's apparent suicide, the death of the real Raymond Reddington, and the identity of the imposter currently posing as Reddington.
131	20	"Guillermo Rizal"	No. 128	Cort Hessler	Noah Schechter	May 3, 2019	4.34
The task force investigates a series of kidnappings of children who turn out to be identical twins or triplets. They had all been born to parents who used in-vitro fertilisation. Their embryos, some of which had their DNA subtly changed, were replaced by a blacklister. Reddington continues to track down evidence of corruption of Anna McMahon. Liz considers making amends with Reddington.
132	21	"Anna McMahon"	No. 60	Michael Caracciolo	Taylor Martin & Kelli Johnson	May 10, 2019	4.03
The task force continues to investigate presidential advisor Anna McMahon, racing against the Secret Service to find the dossier containing proof of the conspiracy against the President. McMahon storms the Post Office with Homeland Security, seizes the evidence, and arrests the taskforce for conspiracy to assassinate the President.
133	22	"Robert Diaz"	No. 15	Bill Roe	Jon Bokenkamp & John Eisendrath & Lukas Reiter	May 17, 2019	4.46
Liz avoids capture and, with Reddington's help, frees the others. They infiltrate the presidential debate to stop the assassination of the president, but the First Lady is shot and Liz, Ressler, and Aram are arrested. Reddington and his men assault the convoy taking them to be murdered. Dembe turns up and kills McMahon, saving Reddington's life. Reddington realises that the shooter couldn't have missed, meaning the First Lady was the real target. Panabaker takes Reddington to the First Lady, who tells him that she knew her husband ran over a mother and child while drunk and covered it up. Cooper informs President Diaz that the FBI will be opening an investigation into him. Liz welcomes Agnes home. Reddington travels to Paris to warn Katarina about the KGB, but she abducts him.

== Reception ==
=== Critical response ===
The review aggregator Rotten Tomatoes reports a 100% approval score based on 5 reviews, with an average rating of 9.3/10.

=== Ratings ===
Viewership and ratings per episode of The Blacklist season 6
No.	Title	Air date	Rating/share (18–49)	Viewers (millions)	DVR (18–49)	DVR viewers (millions)	Total (18–49)	Total viewers (millions)
1	"Dr. Hans Koehler (No. 33)"	January 3, 2019	0.9/4	4.15	0.8	3.64	1.6	8.00
2	"The Corsican (No. 20)"	January 4, 2019	0.6/3	3.91	0.5	3.09	1.1	7.00
3	"The Pharmacist (No. 124)"	January 11, 2019	0.6/3	3.66	0.6	3.29	1.2	6.94
4	"The Pawnbrokers (No. 146/147)"	January 18, 2019	0.6/3	4.04	0.7	3.40	1.3	7.44
5	"Alter Ego (No. 131)"	February 1, 2019	0.5/3	3.68	0.8	3.69	1.3	7.37
6	"The Ethicist (No. 91)"	February 8, 2019	0.6/3	4.24	0.8	3.59	1.4	7.83
7	"General Shiro (No. 116)"	February 15, 2019	0.6/3	3.59	0.7	3.53	1.3	7.12
8	"Marko Jankowics (No. 58)"	February 22, 2019	0.6/3	4.34	0.5	2.86	1.1	7.20
9	"Minister D (No. 99)"	February 22, 2019	0.6/3	3.97	0.6	3.28	1.2	7.26
10	"The Cryptobanker (No. 160)"	March 8, 2019	0.5/3	3.82	0.7	3.29	1.2	7.11
11	"Bastien Moreau (No. 20)"	March 15, 2019	0.5/3	3.36	0.7	3.41	1.2	6.80
12	"Bastien Moreau: Conclusion (No. 20)"	March 22, 2019	0.6/3	4.18	0.6	3.19	1.2	7.38
13	"Robert Vesco (No. 9)"	March 29, 2019	0.6/3	4.33	0.6	2.93	1.2	7.26
14	"The Osterman Umbrella Company (No. 6)"	March 29, 2019	0.5/3	4.00	0.7	3.33	1.2	7.34
15	"Olivia Olson (No. 115)"	April 5, 2019	0.5/3	3.62	0.7	3.38	1.2	7.00
16	"Lady Luck (No. 69)"	April 12, 2019	0.5/3	3.57	0.6	3.12	1.1	6.69
17	"The Third Estate (No. 136)"	April 19, 2019	0.6/3	4.04	0.6	3.31	1.2	7.29
18	"The Brockton College Killer (No. 92)"	April 26, 2019	0.6/4	4.09	0.6	2.86	1.2	6.96
19	"Rassvet"	April 26, 2019	0.5/3	3.95	0.7	3.27	1.2	7.27
20	"Guillermo Rizal (No. 128)"	May 3, 2019	0.6/4	4.34	0.6	2.86	1.2	7.20
21	"Anna McMahon (No. 60)"	May 10, 2019	0.6/4	4.03	0.6	2.77	1.2	6.81
22	"Robert Diaz (No. 15)"	May 17, 2019	0.6/4	4.46	0.6	2.82	1.2	7.33
