= Mike Boland (actor) =

American actor (born 1965)

- Born: 1965 (age 60–61); Fairfield, Connecticut, U.S.
- Years active: 1997–present

Mike Boland (born 1965) is an American television, stage, and film actor.

== Early life ==
Boland was born and raised in Fairfield, Connecticut. Initially a journalist for The Milford Citizen, Boland did not start acting until his first audition at the age of 32.

== Career ==
Boland began acting on the stage, and has since gone on to act and direct in theatres across the United States. After beginning in regional productions, Boland joined the National Tour of 12 Angry Men in 2007. He has since portrayed Juror #1 and Juror #3 in hundreds of productions across the country, including a stint in 2023 when he both directed and starred in the play.

From 2009 to 2010, Boland had three roles in the first off-Broadway production of The Orphans' Home Cycle with the Signature Theater Company. The ensemble cast won a Special Drama Desk Award, and the New York Drama Critics' Circle named it the Best Play of 2010. From 2010 to 2012 Boland held the roles of Officer Krupke and later Detective Schrank in the Broadway Revival Tour of West Side Story. Later in 2012, Boland made his Broadway debut as a Townsperson in An Enemy of the People at the Samuel J. Friedman Theatre. In 2016, Boland joined the National Tour of All My Sons as the lead role, Joe Keller.

On television, Boland has appeared in numerous shows, including Rubicon (2010), Zero Hour and Person of Interest (both 2013), and FBI (2018). In 2019, Boland booked a recurring role as Warden Jim Macatee in season six of The Blacklist, playing opposite James Spader. Most recently, Boland appeared in the first episode of the 2025 Netflix miniseries, Sirens.

== Stage productions ==
| Year | Title | Role | Notes | Ref. |
|---|---|---|---|---|
| 2007–2008 | 12 Angry Men | Juror #1 | National Tour | |
| 2009–2010 | The Orphans' Home Cycle | Ritter/B. Vaughn/M. Reeves | Off-Broadway: Signature Theatre Company | |
| 2010–2012 | West Side Story | Officer Krupke/Detective Schrank | Broadway Revival Tour | |
| 2012 | An Enemy of the People | Townsperson | Broadway: Samuel J. Friedman Theatre | |
| 2016 | All My Sons | Joe Keller | National Tour | |

== Filmography ==
Key
| † | Denotes films that have not yet been released |

=== Film ===
| Year | Title | Role | Notes |
|---|---|---|---|
| 2004 | What I Want | Oskar | |
| 2006 | Up and Down Again | Jim Maloney | |
| 2007 | Bobby Dogs | Bobby Tucker | |
| 2010 | Kate & Kula | Dr. Brian Keith | |
| 2017 | Home Movie | The Man | |
| 2022 | A Stage of Twilight | Lou | |
| TBD | The Summer They Came † | Lou Sullivan | |
| TBD | Yo Andrea † | Tommy | Also writer/director |

=== Television ===
| Year | Title | Role | Notes |
|---|---|---|---|
| 2010 | Rubicon | Joe's Uncle | Episode: "Wayward Sons" |
| 2013 | Zero Hour | Plum Island Guard #1 | Episode: "Hands" |
| 2013 | Person of Interest | Bartender | Episode: "Liberty" |
| 2015–2016 | Frank and Ernie | Ernie | 4 episodes |
| 2018 | FBI | Jim Dunn | Episode: "Cops and Robbers" |
| 2019 | The Blacklist | Warden Jim Macatee | 3 episodes |
| 2025 | Sirens | Greg | Episode: "Exile" |
