= The Blacklist: Redemption =

- Genre: Crime drama; Action; Thriller
- Created by: Jon Bokenkamp; John Eisendrath; Lukas Reiter; J. R. Orci
- Starring: Famke Janssen; Ryan Eggold; Edi Gathegi; Tawny Cypress; Adrian Martinez
- Composer: Dave Porter
- Country of origin: United States
- Original language: English
- No. of seasons: 1
- No. of episodes: 8

Production
- Executive producers: Jon Bokenkamp; John Davis; John Eisendrath; John Fox; John Terlesky; David Amann
- Camera setup: Single-camera
- Running time: 43 minutes
- Production companies: The Jo(h)ns; Davis Entertainment; Universal Television; Sony Pictures Television

Original release
- Network: NBC
- Release: February 23 – April 13, 2017

Related
- The Blacklist

The Blacklist: Redemption is an American crime thriller television series that aired on NBC from February 23 to April 13, 2017. A spin-off from the NBC series The Blacklist, The Blacklist: Redemption stars Famke Janssen as Susan Scott "Scottie" Hargrave, president of Halcyon Aegis, a private military company with teams of corporate operatives, and Ryan Eggold as Tom Keen. Eggold appeared in The Blacklist and returned to it after completing his role in The Blacklist: Redemption. After an episode of The Blacklist served as a backdoor pilot, the new series was ordered by NBC in May 2016. NBC cancelled the series after one season on May 12, 2017 due to low ratings.

== Premise ==
The Blacklist: Redemption focuses on secret agent Tom Keen and his mother, Susan Hargrave, who runs Halcyon, a covert mercenary organization. While investigating cases, Tom learns that his father, Howard, is alive, which leads Tom to discoveries about his past and the rivalry between Susan and Howard, discoveries that force Tom to choose a side.

== Cast ==
=== Main ===
- Famke Janssen as Susan Scott "Scottie" Hargrave, head of Halcyon Aegis' Grey Matters branch, a covert mercenary organization
- Ryan Eggold as Tom Keen, Scottie's son, and a skilled secret agent
- Edi Gathegi as Matias Solomon, a mercenary
- Tawny Cypress as Nez Rowan, a mercenary
- Adrian Martinez as Dumont, a brilliant computer hacker

=== Recurring ===
- Terry O'Quinn as Howard Hargrave, founder of Halcyon Aegis, and Tom Keen's father
- Theodora Miranne as Kat Carlson, Scottie's personal assistant
- Dan Amboyer as Daniel / "Trevor", the much younger male prostitute Scottie visits, who eventually starts a relationship with Kat

Additionally, The Blacklist stars Megan Boone and Harry Lennix made guest appearances during the season.

== Production ==
Key art of the series. From left to right: Susan Hargrave (Famke Janssen), Mathias Solomon (Edi Gathegi) and Tom Keen (Ryan Eggold).

=== Development ===
In March 2016, NBC began developing a spin-off series created by The Blacklist creator Jon Bokenkamp and showrunner John Eisendrath, who would both executive produce with John Davis and John Fox, the rest of their team from the original series. The project stars Famke Janssen as Susan "Scottie" Hargrave and Ryan Eggold reprising his role as Tom Keen, and was conceived to highlight a similar dynamic between Scottie and Tom to what Raymond "Red" Reddington (James Spader) has to Liz Keen (Megan Boone) on The Blacklist. Additionally, Janssen first appeared in the role in The Blacklist episode "Susan Hargrave" in May, with the following episode, "Alexander Kirk", serving as a backdoor pilot for the potential series. The new series, named The Blacklist: Redemption, was ordered on May 14. In October, David Amann was named the series' showrunner and executive producer. The series aired on Thursdays at 10 p.m., the same slot its mother series had for its fourth season. On May 12, 2017, NBC canceled the series after one season and Eggold returned to his role on The Blacklist. The Hollywood Reporter reported that the network made this decision following the first season's disappointing ratings compared to The Blacklist.

=== Casting ===
The cast of The Blacklist: Redemption included Famke Janssen as Susan Hargrave, Ryan Eggold as Tom Keen, Edi Gathegi as Matias Solomon, and Tawny Cypress as Nez Rowan. Adrian Martinez was added in a recurring role as computer hacker Dumont. Eggold was having a main role on the original series, and was mostly absent from the show's fourth season due to filming a spin-off. The rest of the actors previously guest-starred on Blacklist, being introduced in the third season.

Terry O'Quinn was cast as Howard Hargrave, Tom's father, in a recurring role. Additional recurring characters in the series include Theodora Miranne as Kat Carlson, and Dan Amboyer as Daniel / "Trevor". Boone and Harry Lennix reprised their Blacklist roles as Elizabeth Keen and Harold Cooper, respectively, in the series. Showrunners reported it was highly unlikely for James Spader to reprise his role of Raymond Reddington, the original series’ titular character, in the first season of the spin-off; however, he could appear later in the series.

== Episodes ==
| No. | Title | Directed by | Written by | Original release date | U.S. viewers (millions) |
|---|---|---|---|---|---|
| 1 | "Leland Bray" | John Terlesky | Story by : Jon Bokenkamp & John Eisendrath & Lukas Reiter & J. R. Orci; Teleplay by : Jon Bokenkamp & John Eisendrath & David Amann | February 23, 2017 | 4.26 |
Tom Keen travels to New York to discuss his late father's estate only to discover that his father, Howard, is alive and faked his death. Howard enlists Tom to join his mother’s security firm to help find a kidnapped CIA agent.
| 2 | "Kevin Jensen" | Donald E. Thorin, Jr. | Lukas Reiter | March 2, 2017 | 4.76 |
Tom’s mother, Susan "Scottie" Hargrave, enlists the team on a dangerous mission when her family friend, American journalist Kevin Jensen, is falsely arrested for espionage in a foreign country and must be rescued before he is executed.
| 3 | "Independence, U.S.A." | Bill Roe | Sean Hennen | March 9, 2017 | 3.69 |
A plane crash in the Ural Mountains sends Tom and Nez to infiltrate a top-secret military facility that is a replica of an American town where Russian agents are trained to replace Americans. Scottie learns Howard had been searching for their son just before his faked death. Howard suggests to Tom that Scottie is an imposter. Scottie enlists Solomon to find answers about her husband.
| 4 | "Operation Davenport" | John Terlesky | Richard D'Ovidio & Spencer Hudnut | March 16, 2017 | 4.12 |
When terrorists escape from a CIA black site in Manhattan, Tom and the team must find them and lock down the city before disaster strikes. Scottie uncovers clues about her son that could expose Tom's identity.
| 5 | "Borealis 301" | Elodie Keene | Glen Whitman & Matt Bosack | March 23, 2017 | 3.96 |
Tom and Solomon go undercover as flight attendants on an international flight to catch a team of thieves who steal valuable cargo from planes. Howard urges Tom to find proof of a conspiracy orchestrated by Scottie. Scottie discovers the truth about Howard's faked death.
| 6 | "Hostages" | Andrew McCarthy | Dan E. Fesman & Sean Hennen | March 30, 2017 | 3.99 |
A wealthy businessman and his family are abducted and the Halcyon team rushes to get them back. With time running out, the team must make a dangerous choice. Tom risks his safety to rescue his father and stop Scottie from learning the truth.
| 7 | "Whitehall" | Oz Scott | Spencer Hudnut & Richard D'Ovidio & Kathryn Miller Kelley | April 6, 2017 | 3.72 |
Tom escapes from Halcyon after Scottie discovers his identity and orders him tortured for information. Tom teams with his father to discover the secret of the mysterious "Whitehall".
| 8 | "Whitehall: Conclusion" | John Terlesky | Story by : J. R. Orci; Teleplay by : Dan E. Fesman & Glen Whitman & Matt Bosack | April 13, 2017 | 3.92 |
Scottie and Howard battle for control of Halcyon and the technology tied to Whitehall, forcing Tom, Nez, and Solomon to choose sides. Kat makes a discovery while investigating irregularities in Halcyon's operations. Tom clashes with Solomon as he makes a fateful choice.

== Reception ==
=== Ratings ===
The series premiere drew in 4.2 million viewers, with a Nielsen rating of 0.8 among adults aged 18–49. The series averaged 6.3 million viewers and a rating of 1.2, making it the third lowest rated NBC series that year after Emerald City and Powerless.

=== Critical reception ===
The Blacklist: Redemption did not receive enough critical reviews to have a score on either Rotten Tomatoes or Metacritic. In her review of the first episode, Sonia Saraiya of Variety wrote that she did not find the charisma of the series’ three main actors to equal that of The Blacklist's James Spader, while Jodi Walker of Entertainment Weekly wrote that the season was a satisfying foundation on which to create what she hoped would be better seasons.

== Ratings ==
Viewership and ratings per episode of The Blacklist: Redemption
| No. | Title | Air date | Rating/share (18–49) | Viewers (millions) | DVR (18–49) | DVR viewers (millions) | Total (18–49) | Total viewers (millions) |
|---|---|---|---|---|---|---|---|---|
| 1 | "Leland Bray" | February 23, 2017 | 0.8/3 | 4.26 | —N/a | 2.495 | —N/a | 6.751 |
| 2 | "Kevin Jensen" | March 2, 2017 | 1.0/4 | 4.76 | —N/a | —N/a | —N/a | —N/a |
| 3 | "Independence, U.S.A." | March 9, 2017 | 0.7/3 | 3.69 | 0.5 | 2.282 | 1.2 | 5.999 |
| 4 | "Operation Davenport" | March 16, 2017 | 0.7/3 | 4.12 | 0.5 | 2.135 | 1.2 | 6.253 |
| 5 | "Borealis 301" | March 23, 2017 | 0.7/3 | 3.96 | —N/a | 2.023 | —N/a | 5.979 |
| 6 | "Hostages" | March 30, 2017 | 0.8/3 | 3.99 | —N/a | 2.105 | —N/a | 6.095 |
| 7 | "Whitehall" | April 6, 2017 | 0.7/3 | 3.72 | —N/a | 2.062 | —N/a | 5.769 |
| 8 | "Whitehall: Conclusion" | April 13, 2017 | 0.7/3 | 3.92 | —N/a | 2.009 | —N/a | 5.858 |
