= Wujing (The Blacklist) =

- The Blacklist episode
- Episode no.: Season 1 Episode 3
- Directed by: Michael Watkins
- Written by: Lukas Reiter
- Production code: 103
- Original air date: October 7, 2013

Guest appearances
- Chin Han as Wujing; Amir Arison as Aram Mojtabai; Hisham Tawfiq as Dembe Zuma; Deborah S. Craig as Luli Zeng; Graeme Malcolm as The Man with the Apple; Rob Yang as Jin Sun; Andrew Pang as Henry Cho; David Andrew Macdonald as Wujing's Associate; Susan Kelechi Watson as Ellie

Episode chronology
← Previous "The Freelancer"	Next → "The Stewmaker"
- The Blacklist season 1

"Wujing" is the third episode of the first season of the American crime drama The Blacklist. The episode premiered in the United States on NBC on October 7, 2013.

== Plot ==
High-profile Chinese criminal Wujing (Chin Han) asks Red for help to decrypt a message from a CIA agent who was murdered in Shanghai. Red appoints Elizabeth to go undercover as a master decrypter, and they arrive at Wujing's underground base in the States. With help from a CIA-provided device, Elizabeth decrypts the message of Wujing's target, Washington, D.C. based architect and CIA asset Henry Cho. As Red and Elizabeth accompany Wujing's gang in escaping from the FBI, Ressler and Malik race to save Cho and his son from Wujing's assassins. Elizabeth plants her tracker on Wujing's car, leading to his arrest. Red reveals that he chose Elizabeth to work with him because of her father, but he supplies no further details. Meanwhile, Elizabeth requests a ballistics report on the gun from Tom's box. The results are classified as it was involved with a high-profile homicide. An unknown party sets up surveillance on Elizabeth's house, characterized by their leader who eats an apple every time. Red opens the letter containing Wujing's payment – it's just a sheet of paper with the number 042983 on it.

== Reception ==
=== Ratings ===
"Wujing" premiered on NBC on October 7, 2013, in the 10–11 p.m. time slot. The episode garnered a 3.1/9 Nielsen rating with 11.18 million viewers, making it the highest rated show in its time slot and the seventh most watched television show of the week.

=== Reviews ===
Jason Evans of The Wall Street Journal gave a mixed review of "Wujing". While he thought each episode of the series had "elements of a basic procedural show like Law & Order", he appreciated the "little nuggets of an ongoing story about Liz’s relationship with her husband and with Ray".

Phil Dyess-Nugent of The A.V. Club gave the episode a "D+", noting that the episode "represents a quantum leap in boringness for The Blacklist". He felt that the "established supporting characters [didn't] get to show any new sides, and the imperiled guest characters who need rescuing from the bad guys [were] barely introduced".

Ross Bonaime of Paste gave "Wujing" a 5.3/10, stating that: "The Blacklist keeps acting like it has all these fascinating cards up its sleeve, but it never shows them. Three episodes in, the mysteries that the show is holding out on aren’t worth tuning in each week to solve, and the things it does reveal mean absolutely nothing to the viewer".
