= Raymond Reddington =

Fictional character from The Blacklist

- The Blacklist character
- James Spader as Raymond Reddington
- First appearance: "Pilot" (2013)
- Last appearance: "Raymond Reddington: Good Night" (2023)
- Created by: Jon Bokenkamp
- Based on: Whitey Bulger
- Portrayed by: James Spader

In-universe information
- Full name: Raymond Reddington
- Alias: The Concierge of Crime
- Nicknames: Number 00; The Man in the Hat; Pinky; Steve Homan; Bill Houston; Bill Kershaw; Red; Caden Gard; William Burchfield; Robert Bortner
- Gender: Male
- Occupation: Criminal mastermind, FBI informant
- Family: Naomi Hyland (ex-wife, divorced, deceased); Jennifer Reddington (daughter, deceased); Elizabeth Keen (daughter, deceased); Agnes Keen (granddaughter); Dembe Zuma (foster son); Isabella Zuma (foster granddaughter); Elle Zuma (foster great-granddaughter)
- Nationality: American

Raymond Reddington is a fictional character and the central figure in the American television series The Blacklist, which aired on NBC from 2013 to 2023. Portrayed by James Spader, Reddington is a former US Naval Intelligence officer who became a high-profile criminal and later an FBI confidential informant.

Once listed as number four on the FBI's Ten Most Wanted Fugitives, he voluntarily surrenders to Assistant Director Harold Cooper at the J. Edgar Hoover Building in Washington, D.C. Following his arrest and transfer to an FBI black site, Reddington offers to assist in capturing individuals he describes as particularly dangerous criminals and terrorists, many of whom are unknown to law enforcement. His cooperation is conditional on working exclusively with newly appointed FBI profiler Elizabeth Keen.

A recurring narrative in the series is the development of the relationship between Reddington and Elizabeth Keen (portrayed by Megan Boone), which shifts from a professional collaboration to a more complex and emotionally layered association. Their connection, shaped by secrecy and ambiguity, contributes to the character development across the series.

The character of Reddington has been the subject of critical analysis, with particular focus on James Spader's interpretation. His performance has received several award nominations, including from the Golden Globe Awards, and has been identified as a significant element in the series' reception.

The character is based on "Whitey" Bulger, an American organized crime boss who led the Winter Hill Gang, an Irish mob group who managed to evade the FBI for over 16 years, second on the FBI's Most Wanted List behind Islamic terrorist leader Osama bin Laden.

== Fictional character biography ==
=== Early life and military career ===
Raymond Reddington is a graduate of the United States Naval Academy, where he graduated top of his class when he was 24 years old. He was being groomed for the position of admiral when he disappeared while returning home to visit his family for Christmas in 1990. Reddington was last seen by the FBI at the start of the show.

Raymond Reddington listed on the FBI's Ten Most Wanted Fugitives

After his disappearance, Reddington became a fugitive of the FBI and entered the criminal underworld. Over the next two decades, he formed networks and conducted business within the criminal world, becoming known as the "Concierge of Crime." He remained one of the FBI's most wanted fugitives and evaded arrest for 20 years. initially at number four and later ascending to the top position.

Robert Vesco mentored Reddington in his early days as a fugitive. After Vesco deceived him in a failed investment scheme, he began working with SVR (Russian Foreign Intelligence Service) agent Ivan Stepanov. This relationship deepened over time, with Stepanov becoming a close friend and ally.

=== Criminal enterprise and notable associates ===
Reddington rescued Dembe Zuma the son of Samwel Zuma, a farmer who identified a low-ranking operative of the Mombasa Cartel, from human trafficking in Kenya when he was 14 years old. He had been sold after his family was killed when he was six. Reddington found him chained in the basement of a brothel in Nairobi. He later took Dembe in, helped him recover, and ensured that he received a university education.

He interacted with numerous figures in the criminal underworld, including Hans Koehler (plastic surgeon), T. Earl King VI (arms dealer), Anslo Garrick (former associate turned enemy), Gina Zanetakos (assassin), and Bo Chang (technological expert). Reddington also maintained relationships with individuals such as lawyer Marvin Gerard and grifter Gregory Devry.

=== Connection to Elizabeth Keen ===
Reddington maintained a longstanding interest in Elizabeth Keen, arranging for his friend Sam Scott to foster her after her parents' disappearance. As she grew older, he hired operative Christopher Hargrave (later known as Tom Keen) to watch over her under the guidance of an intermediary known as the Major. Reddington later ended the arrangement when Tom became romantically involved with Liz.

He also covertly monitored her progress through the FBI Academy and ensured she graduated early. He remained invested in her safety throughout the series, often manipulating events to protect her.

=== Identity and the Blacklist ===
Reddington's identity is one of the major secrets of the series. The relationship between him and Liz Keen plays a major role in his character. Liz thinks that Reddington is her father, though it is never revealed. Reddington's identity remains ambiguous, including a theory of Katarina Rostova, being the mother of Liz. According to Reddington, the persona was created by Katarina Rostova and Ilya Koslov to protect Liz. It is eventually revealed that the real Raymond Reddington died, likely at the hands of a young Elizabeth during a violent confrontation involving her mother.

=== Final revelations ===
In the episode "Nachalo," Reddington brings Elizabeth Keen to a Cold War-era bunker in Latvia, where he discloses critical information regarding the real Raymond Reddington's death and the origins of the imposter. It is revealed that the original Reddington discovered Katarina Rostova was working not only for the KGB but also for the Cabal. He created the Fulcrum and fled to the United States with Liz. During a confrontation involving Katarina and her associates, including Ilya Koslov, a fire broke out. Liz shot Reddington to protect her mother, and despite efforts to save him, he died from his injuries. The Fulcrum was believed destroyed in the fire. Due to evidence planted by Katarina, the public came to view Reddington as a traitor.

Liz later learns that much of what she believed about Katarina Rostova was inaccurate. The woman she knew as her mother was actually Tatiana Petrova, a decoy used to fake Katarina's death. Tatiana sought to reclaim her identity, ultimately leading to her death at the hands of Reddington, who aimed to protect Katarina's secret. It is revealed that Katarina and Ilya constructed the imposter Reddington to protect Liz in Katarina's absence. With assistance from KGB operative Ivan Stepanov, the imposter, who within the episode's narrative is strongly implied to be Rostova herself, acquired the Sikorsky Archive, which became the basis of his criminal network.

While Liz attempts to uncover Reddington's true identity and Katarina's whereabouts, their location is attacked by Neville Townsend, resulting in Liz being severely injured and the deaths of Reddington's men, save for Dembe. Reddington detonates the bunker, killing Townsend, and affirms that Liz, not the Archive, is the foundation of his influence. In the episode "Konets," Reddington, now terminally ill, prepares for his death and plans to have Liz kill him and inherit his empire, in exchange for a letter from her mother disclosing his identity. Liz ultimately hesitates, but is killed by one of Townsend's surviving operatives before she can act, dying in Reddington's arms.

In season nine, following Liz's death, Harold Cooper reunites the task force and searches for Reddington, finding him in Cuba living with his bodyguard Weecha and healer Mierce. Although he remains emotionally affected, Reddington reengages with the task force after Dembe is endangered. Initially, Cooper denies Reddington access to Liz's daughter Agnes, prompting tension between them, though they later reach a mutual understanding.

In the episode "Dr. Roberta Sand, Ph.D.," Agnes recounts a statement from Liz indicating that she had read the letter revealing Reddington's true identity. This prompts Reddington to investigate further. He confirms fingerprints on the letter and reviews surveillance, noting a photograph of Dembe and Liz hours before her death. After initially suspecting Dembe of compromising Liz's safety, new information reveals that the attack was orchestrated by another party.

In "Boukman Baptiste," it is shown that Reddington had temporarily disappeared after the events of season eight, leaving his criminal enterprise in disarray. Dembe assumed control of the organization before becoming an FBI agent. Encouraged by Marvin Gerard, Reddington decides to return and restore his criminal operations.

In "Raymond Reddington: Good Night", hunted by the FBI again and growing increasingly ill, Red visits a villa in Spain to perform one last personal mission before allowing a bull to maul him to death so as to go out on his own terms. Ressler discovers Red's body shortly thereafter, while Dembe reflects that with Red, it was never about the end of the story, but the adventure on which he brought everyone, and how Red had worked so hard to protect everyone from the worst of the worst criminals.

== Role in The Blacklist ==
Reddington provides the FBI with a "blacklist", a list of criminals and terrorists unknown to law enforcement. In exchange for immunity, he helps bring these individuals to justice, often through morally ambiguous methods. His enigmatic relationship with Elizabeth Keen becomes the emotional core of the series, fueling ongoing questions about his true identity and motives.

== Character development ==
Reddington is portrayed as an intelligent and mysterious figure whose morally ambiguous nature is central to the narrative of The Blacklist. He is introduced as a former U.S. government operative who becomes a wanted fugitive. After evading capture for two decades, Reddington surrenders to FBI Assistant Director Harold Cooper at the J. Edgar Hoover Building in Washington, D.C., offering to help identify and capture high-profile criminals. on the condition that he works exclusively with FBI rookie Elizabeth Keen (portrayed by Megan Boone). Reddington’s character arc is defined by the tension between his identity as a criminal and his role as a protector. His relationship with Elizabeth Keen progresses from that of an enigmatic overseer to a multifaceted paternal figure, marked by emotional complexity and ambiguous intent. Although Reddington’s true identity remains undisclosed for the majority of the series, his consistent loyalty to Elizabeth Keen serves as a central element of the storyline.

Reddington is consistently portrayed as operating within a morally ambiguous framework. He frequently engages in criminal and violent activities, which are often depicted as serving a perceived greater good. The character’s ethical complexity is explored through recurring themes such as personal loss, mortality, and introspection. His eloquence and penchant for storytelling are contrasted with a willingness to use calculated violence, positioning him as a complex antihero.

Reddington’s character is developed further through his relationships with recurring characters, particularly Dembe Zuma (portrayed by Hisham Tawfiq), his trusted confidant. His enduring bond with Dembe reveals a more empathetic and loyal aspect of his personality, contrasting with his otherwise criminal behavior.

In the later seasons, Reddington’s declining health and awareness of mortality become central to his narrative. These developments introduce a more reflective dimension to his character, with the final season addressing the consequences of his past actions and concluding with his death in Spain.

=== Character traits & style ===
Reddington is characterized by his intelligence, composed demeanor, and ethically ambiguous behavior. He frequently relies on storytelling and psychological manipulation to navigate complex situations. Known as "the Concierge of Crime," he is portrayed as a refined criminal figure with a cultivated appreciation for food, art, and subtlety.

=== Inspiration ===
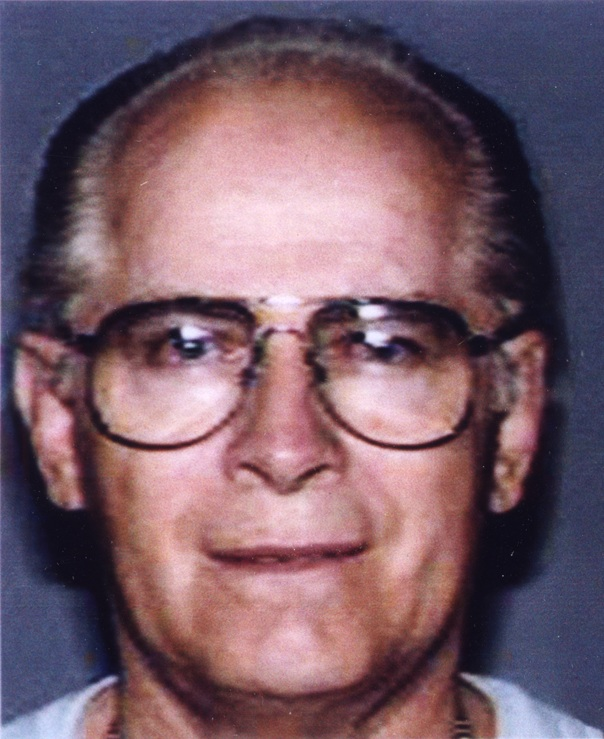
1994 mugshot of James "Whitey" Bulger

The character of Raymond Reddington is believed to be loosely inspired by real-life Boston-Irish mobster James "Whitey" Bulger. According to series creator Jon Bokenkamp, the idea of a high-profile criminal voluntarily surrendering to the FBI and offering to expose other criminals was influenced by Bulger's complex history as both a fugitive and an FBI informant. Bulger evaded capture for 16 years before his arrest in 2011 and was known for maintaining connections within law enforcement while continuing his criminal activities, up until his own murder in 2018. Although The Blacklist is a work of fiction, the character’s role as both a criminal and an informant has drawn comparisons to the life of Whitey Bulger.

== Reception ==
Reddington became one of the most iconic TV antiheroes of the 2010s. Critics often compared him to characters like Walter White from Breaking Bad and Dexter Morgan from Dexter. James Spader’s portrayal of Reddington received critical acclaim, praised for its charisma, unpredictability, and dry wit.

Spader was nominated for the Golden Globe Award for Best Actor – Television Series Drama in both 2014 and 2015 for his portrayal of Reddington. His performance also earned recognition from other awards organizations, including the Critics' Choice Television Awards.

== In popular culture ==
Due to his personality and dialogue, Reddington became a pop culture figure and a frequent subject of internet memes and fan theories.
