= John Eisendrath =

American television producer

John Eisendrath is an American television series producer and writer. He created and served as the executive producer and showrunner for the series Outlaw, Playmakers, and The Blacklist. More recently, Eisendrath signed a new three-year overall deal with Sony Pictures Television through 2025.

== Personal life ==
John Eisendrath was born into a Jewish family, the son of Edwin W. Eisendrath Jr. and Susan Rosenberg. He is the younger brother of Edwin Eisendrath (former alderman of Chicago and CEO of the Chicago Sun-Times). His father was an attorney and his mother came from a powerful West Side political family. He joined WBBM in the mid-1980s, only to leave with friend Kathryn Pratt to start a TV writing career.

He and Kathryn Pratt married in 1992 and had two children. Their marriage was dissolved in 2002. Following the dissolution he married television writer Jennifer Levin. In 2003, his Thanksgiving Day production company created a show for ESPN, Playmakers. In 2008, he was signed to a deal with Universal Media Studios.

== Credits ==
=== Writer ===
- Beverly Hills Buntz (1988; story: 1 episode)
- TV 101 (1989; writer: 2 episodes)
- WIOU (1990; creator: 14 episodes; story: 1 episode; teleplay: 1 episode)
- Models Inc. (1994; writer: 3 episodes)
- Malibu Shores (1996; writer: 2 episodes; story: 1 episode)
- Beverly Hills, 90210 (1990; writer: 34 episodes; teleplay: 2 episodes; story: 1 episode)
- Felicity (1998; writer: 3 episodes)
- Alias (2001; writer: 8 episodes)
- Playmakers (2003; creator; writer: 3 episodes)
- The Catch (2005; TV movie: creator)
- K-Ville (2007; writer: 1 episode)
- Outlaw (2010; creator; writer: 3 episodes)
- The Blacklist (2013; writer: 16 episodes; teleplay: 8 episodes; story: 3 episodes)
- The Blacklist: Redemption (2017; creator; story: 1 episode; teleplay: 1 episode)

=== Executive producer ===
- WIOU (1990; executive producer)
- Models Inc. (1994; co-supervising producer: 17 episodes)
- Malibu Shores (1996; co-executive producer: 8 episodes)
- Beverly Hills, 90210 (1990; supervising producer: 25 episodes; co-executive producer: 32 episodes; executive producer: 85 episodes)
- Felicity (1998; executive producer: 15 episodes)
- Playmakers (2003; executive producer: 11 episodes)
- Alias (2001; executive producer: 66 episodes)
- The Catch (2005; TV movie—executive producer)
- Supreme Courtships (2007; TV movie—executive producer)
- K-Ville (2007; consulting producer: 8 episodes)
- My Own Worst Enemy (2008; executive producer: 9 episodes)
- Outlaw (2010; executive producer: 3 episodes)
- The Blacklist (2013; executive producer: 114 episodes)
- The Blacklist: Redemption (2017; producer: 5 episodes; executive producer: 3 episodes)

=== Self ===
- The Story Behind: Beverly Hills, 90210 (2015)
