= Jon Bokenkamp =

American writer and producer

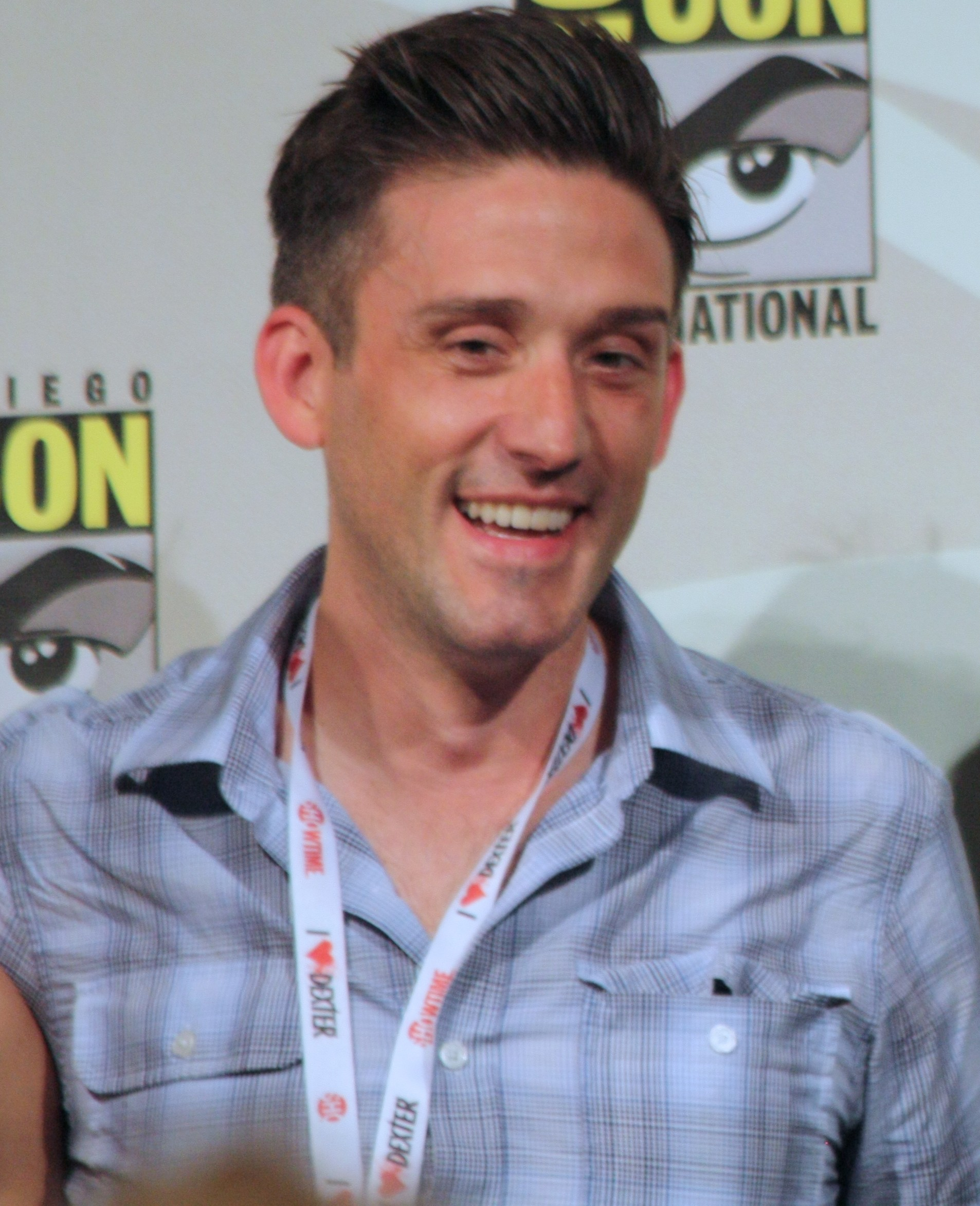
- Bokenkamp at the 2013 San Diego Comic-Con
- Born: June 30, 1973 (age 52); Kearney, Nebraska, U.S.
- Occupations: Writer, film producer
- Years active: 2000–present

Jon Bokenkamp (born June 30, 1973 in Kearney, Nebraska) is an American writer and producer best known for his role in writing the screenplays for Taking Lives and The Call, and creating the NBC series The Blacklist along with The Blacklist: Redemption.

He was involved in theater and music as a student at Kearney High School, attended the University of Nebraska at Kearney, then went to the School of Cinematic Arts at the University of Southern California.

Bokenkamp was encouraged to enter a script writing competition by friend and fellow Nebraskan, Todd Nelson, creator of the Nebraska Coast Connection. After winning the competition, Jon landed an agent and his first paid assignment, rewriting a horror film for Exorcist director William Friedkin.

Success allowed Bokenkamp to return to his hometown where he earned the 2013 Hub Freedom Award for his work restoring the historic World Theater in downtown Kearney, Nebraska.

Bokenkamp was awarded with an honorary doctorate in fine arts from University of Nebraska at Kearney in May 2019.

== Filmography ==
=== Films ===
Year	Title	Notes
2000	Preston Tylk (also known as Bad Seed)	Writer/director
2001	Drive In Movie Memories (documentary)	Associate producer
2004	Taking Lives	Writer
2007	Perfect Stranger	Writer
2013	The Call	Writer

=== Television ===
Year	Title	Notes
2013–2023	The Blacklist	Creator, executive producer
2017	The Blacklist: Redemption	Creator, executive producer
2025	The Last Frontier	Creator, executive producer
