= List of The Blacklist episodes =

The Blacklist is an American crime drama television series created by Jon Bokenkamp that premiered on NBC on September 23, 2013. The series, starring James Spader, Megan Boone, Diego Klattenhoff, Ryan Eggold, Hisham Tawfiq, and Harry Lennix, follows Raymond "Red" Reddington (James Spader), one of the FBI's most wanted fugitives, surrenders at J. Edgar Hoover Building in Washington, D.C. He claims that he and the FBI have similar interests in getting rid of dangerous criminals and terrorists. Reddington will cooperate only with Elizabeth Keen (Megan Boone), a rookie FBI criminal profiler who we see in the first episode, has trouble profiling just herself and is not too keen on the idea. Over the course of his own criminal career, Reddington has made a list of global criminals who he believes are acting liabilities to his own interests or to society, most of whom are unknown to the FBI, and not on the FBI's "Most Wanted" list — he calls it "The Blacklist". As the series progresses, Reddington uses the FBI to apprehend enemies and strategic interests for his own personal gain. Executive producers for the series include Bokenkamp, John Eisendrath, and John Davis for Sony Pictures Television, Universal Television, and Davis Entertainment.

During the course of the series, 218 episodes of The Blacklist aired over ten seasons, between September 23, 2013, and July 13, 2023.

== Series overview ==
Season	Episodes	Originally released		Rank	Average viewers (millions)
Season	Episodes	First released	Last released	Rank	Average viewers (millions)
1	22	September 23, 2013	May 12, 2014	6	14.95
2	22	September 22, 2014	May 14, 2015	14	13.76
3	23	October 1, 2015	May 19, 2016	22	11.19
4	22	September 22, 2016	May 18, 2017	30	9.25
5	22	September 27, 2017	May 16, 2018	42	8.41
6	22	January 3, 2019	May 17, 2019	57	6.87
7	19	October 4, 2019	May 15, 2020	50	6.88
8	22	November 13, 2020	June 23, 2021	51	5.47
9	22	October 21, 2021	May 27, 2022	50	4.77
10	22	February 26, 2023	July 13, 2023	60	3.83

== Episodes ==
=== Season 1 (2013–14) ===
No. overall	No. in season	Title	Blacklist guide	Directed by	Written by	Original release date	US viewers (millions)
1	1	"Pilot"	N/A	Joe Carnahan	Jon Bokenkamp	September 23, 2013	12.58
2	2	"The Freelancer"	No. 145	Jace Alexander	Jon Bokenkamp	September 30, 2013	11.35
3	3	"Wujing"	No. 84	Michael Watkins	Lukas Reiter	October 7, 2013	11.18
4	4	"The Stewmaker"	No. 161	Vince Misiano	Patrick Massett & John Zinman	October 14, 2013	10.93
5	5	"The Courier"	No. 85	Nick Gomez	John C. Kelley	October 21, 2013	10.44
6	6	"Gina Zanetakos"	No. 152	Adam Arkin	Wendy West	October 28, 2013	10.51
7	7	"Frederick Barnes"	No. 47	Michael Watkins	J. R. Orci	November 4, 2013	10.34
8	8	"General Ludd"	No. 109	Stephen Surjik	Amanda Kate Shuman	November 11, 2013	10.69
9	9	"Anslo Garrick"	No. 16	Joe Carnahan	Story by : Joe Carnahan & Jason George; Teleplay by : Joe Carnahan	November 25, 2013	10.96
10	10	"Anslo Garrick Conclusion"	No. 16	Michael Watkins	Lukas Reiter & J. R. Orci	December 2, 2013	11.67
11	11	"The Good Samaritan"	No. 106	Dan Lerner	Brandon Margolis & Brandon Sonnier	January 13, 2014	9.35
12	12	"The Alchemist"	No. 101	Vince Misiano	Anthony Sparks	January 20, 2014	8.83
13	13	"The Cyprus Agency"	No. 64	Michael Watkins	Lukas Reiter	January 27, 2014	10.17
14	14	"Madeline Pratt"	No. 73	Michael Zinberg	Jim Campolongo	February 24, 2014	11.18
15	15	"The Judge"	No. 57	Peter Werner	Jonathan Shapiro & Lukas Reiter	March 3, 2014	11.01
16	16	"Mako Tanida"	No. 83	Michael Watkins	Story by : Joe Carnahan; Teleplay by : John Eisendrath & Jon Bokenkamp & Patrick Massett & John Zinman	March 17, 2014	10.97
17	17	"Ivan"	No. 88	Randy Zisk	J.R. Orci & Amanda Kate Shuman	March 24, 2014	10.80
18	18	"Milton Bobbit"	No. 135	Steven A. Adelson	Daniel Voll	March 31, 2014	11.39
19	19	"The Pavlovich Brothers"	Nos. 119-122	Paul Edwards	Elizabeth Benjamin	April 21, 2014	11.24
20	20	"The Kingmaker"	No. 42	Karen Gaviola	J. R. Orci & Lukas Reiter	April 28, 2014	10.85
21	21	"Berlin"	No. 8	Michael Zinberg	John Eisendrath & Jon Bokenkamp	May 5, 2014	10.47
22	22	"Berlin Conclusion"	No. 8	Michael Watkins	Story by : Richard D'Ovidio; Teleplay by : John Eisendrath & Jon Bokenkamp & Lukas Reiter & J. R. Orci	May 12, 2014	10.44

=== Season 2 (2014–15) ===
No. overall	No. in season	Title	Blacklist guide	Directed by	Written by	Original release date	US viewers (millions)
23	1	"Lord Baltimore"	No. 104	Michael Watkins	Jon Bokenkamp & John Eisendrath	September 22, 2014	12.55
24	2	"Monarch Douglas Bank"	No. 112	Paul Edwards	Kristen Reidel & Amanda Kate Shuman & Daniel Knauf	September 29, 2014	10.51
25	3	"Dr. James Covington"	No. 89	Karen Gaviola	Lukas Reiter & J. R. Orci	October 6, 2014	10.07
26	4	"Dr. Linus Creel"	No. 82	Michael Watkins	Mike Ostrowski	October 13, 2014	9.76
27	5	"The Front"	No. 74	Steven A. Adelson	Teleplay by : Jim Campolongo & Adam Sussman; Story by : Adam Sussman	October 20, 2014	9.34
28	6	"The Mombasa Cartel"	No. 114	David Platt	Daniel Knauf	October 27, 2014	9.57
29	7	"The Scimitar"	No. 22	Karen Gaviola	J. R. Orci & Lukas Reiter	November 3, 2014	9.30
30	8	"The Decembrist"	No. 12	Michael Watkins	John Eisendrath & Jon Bokenkamp	November 10, 2014	9.75
31	9	"Luther Braxton"	No. 21	Joe Carnahan	Teleplay by : Jon Bokenkamp & John Eisendrath; Story by : J. R. Orci & Lukas Reiter & John Eisendrath & Jon Bokenkamp	February 1, 2015	25.72
32	10	"Luther Braxton Conclusion"	No. 21	Michael Watkins	Teleplay by : Mike Ostrowski & Jim Campolongo; Story by : Kristen Reidel & Vincent Angell	February 5, 2015	10.11
33	11	"Ruslan Denisov"	No. 67	Andrew McCarthy	Jonathan Shapiro & Lukas Reiter	February 12, 2015	8.19
34	12	"The Kenyon Family"	No. 71	David Platt	Vincent Angell & Daniel Knauf	February 19, 2015	7.71
35	13	"The Deer Hunter"	No. 93	Andrew McCarthy	Amanda Kate Shuman	February 26, 2015	8.01
36	14	"T. Earl King VI"	No. 94	Steven A. Adelson	Brandon Sonnier & Brandon Margolis	March 5, 2015	8.23
37	15	"The Major"	No. 75	Michael Watkins	Jon Bokenkamp & John Eisendrath & Lukas Reiter	March 12, 2015	7.53
38	16	"Tom Keen"	No. 7	Andrew McCarthy	Teleplay by : Lukas Reiter & J. R. Orci; Story by : J. R. Orci & Lukas Reiter & Jon Bokenkamp & John Eisendrath	March 19, 2015	8.64
39	17	"The Longevity Initiative"	No. 97	Donald Thorin Jr.	Lukas Reiter & J. R. Orci	March 26, 2015	8.12
40	18	"Vanessa Cruz"	No. 117	Guy Ferland	Vincent Angell & Daniel Knauf	April 2, 2015	7.70
41	19	"Leonard Caul"	No. 62	Michael Waxman	Brandon Margolis & Brandon Sonnier & Kristen Reidel & Jim Campolongo	April 23, 2015	7.47
42	20	"Quon Zhang"	No. 87	Karen Gaviola	J. R. Orci & Lukas Reiter	April 30, 2015	6.60
43	21	"Karakurt"	No. 55	Steven A. Adelson	Daniel Knauf	May 7, 2015	6.90
44	22	"Tom Connolly" (Note: The episode was initially titled "Masha Rostova", before being renamed "Tom Connolly".)	No. 11	Michael Watkins	John Eisendrath & Jon Bokenkamp	May 14, 2015	7.49

=== Season 3 (2015–16) ===
No. overall	No. in season	Title	Blacklist guide	Directed by	Written by	Original release date	US viewers (millions)
45	1	"The Troll Farmer"	No. 38	Michael Watkins	Jon Bokenkamp & John Eisendrath	October 1, 2015	7.76
46	2	"Marvin Gerard"	No. 80	Andrew McCarthy	Story by : J. R. Orci & Lukas Reiter; Teleplay by : Daniel Knauf & Brandon Sonnier & Brandon Margolis	October 8, 2015	7.02
47	3	"Eli Matchett"	No. 72	Steven A. Adelson	Lukas Reiter & J. R. Orci	October 15, 2015	6.93
48	4	"The Djinn"	No. 43	Omar Madha	Daniel Cerone	October 22, 2015	6.68
49	5	"Arioch Cain"	No. 50	Alex Zakrzewski	Dawn DeNoon	October 29, 2015	7.03
50	6	"Sir Crispin Crandall"	No. 86	Ami Canaan Mann	Dave Thomas	November 5, 2015	6.44
51	7	"Zal Bin Hasaan"	No. 31	Michael Watkins	Brandon Sonnier & Brandon Margolis	November 12, 2015	6.75
52	8	"Kings of the Highway"	No. 108	Terrence O'Hara	Brian Studler	November 19, 2015	6.91
53	9	"The Director"	No. 24	Mary Lambert	Daniel Cerone	January 7, 2016	7.52
54	10	"The Director: Conclusion"	No. 24	John Terlesky	Lukas Reiter	January 14, 2016	7.47
55	11	"Mr. Gregory Devry"	No. 95	Alex Zakrzewski	Daniel Knauf	January 21, 2016	7.42
56	12	"The Vehm"	No. 132	Michael Watkins	Vincent Angell	January 28, 2016	7.16
57	13	"Alistair Pitt"	No. 103	Bill Roe	Story by : Nicole Phillips & Adam Sussman; Teleplay by : Nicole Phillips	February 4, 2016	6.49
58	14	"Lady Ambrosia"	No. 77	Tim Hunter	Taylor Martin	February 11, 2016	6.43
59	15	"Drexel"	No. 113	Anton Cropper	Dave Metzger	February 18, 2016	6.02
60	16	"The Caretaker"	No. 78	Don Thorin, Jr.	Dave Thomas	February 25, 2016	5.97
61	17	"Mr. Solomon"	No. 32	Eagle Egilsson	Brian Studler	April 7, 2016	6.42
62	18	"Mr. Solomon: Conclusion"	No. 32	John Terlesky	Daniel Cerone	April 14, 2016	6.74
63	19	"Cape May"	None	Michael Watkins	Daniel Knauf	April 21, 2016	7.02
64	20	"The Artax Network"	No. 41	Don Thorin, Jr.	Dawn DeNoon	April 28, 2016	6.70
65	21	"Susan Hargrave"	No. 18	Andrew McCarthy	Story by : J. R. Orci & Lukas Reiter; Teleplay by : Vincent Angell & Daniel Cerone & Brian Studler	May 5, 2016	6.65
66	22	"Alexander Kirk"	No. 14	Michael Dinner	Story by : Jon Bokenkamp & John Eisendrath & J. R. Orci & Lukas Reiter; Teleplay by : Jon Bokenkamp & John Eisendrath	May 12, 2016	6.62
67	23	"Alexander Kirk: Conclusion"	No. 14	Bill Roe	Lukas Reiter & J. R. Orci	May 19, 2016	6.88

=== Season 4 (2016–17) ===
No. overall	No. in season	Title	Blacklist guide	Directed by	Written by	Original release date	US viewers (millions)
68	1	"Esteban"	No. 79	Michael Watkins	Jon Bokenkamp, John Eisendrath	September 22, 2016	6.40
69	2	"Mato"	No. 66	Andrew McCarthy	Daniel Cerone	September 29, 2016	5.99
70	3	"Miles McGrath"	No. 65	John Terlesky	Lukas Reiter	October 6, 2016	6.41
71	4	"Gaia"	No. 81	Bill Roe	Peter Noah	October 13, 2016	5.85
72	5	"The Lindquist Concern"	No. 105	Kurt Kuenne	Dawn DeNoon	October 20, 2016	5.32
73	6	"The Thrushes"	No. 53	Terrence O'Hara	Teleplay by : Daniel Knauf; Story by : Daniel Knauf, Dave Metzger	October 27, 2016	5.52
74	7	"Dr. Adrian Shaw"	No. 98	Andrew McCarthy	Chap Taylor	November 3, 2016	5.45
75	8	"Dr. Adrian Shaw: Conclusion"	No. 98	Michael Watkins	Daniel Cerone	November 10, 2016	5.87
76	9	"Lipet's Seafood Company"	No. 111	Don Thorin	Teleplay by : Dawn DeNoon; Story by : Lukas Reiter, Dave Metzger	January 5, 2017	5.21
77	10	"The Forecaster"	No. 163	Edward Ornelas	Kim Newton	January 12, 2017	5.34
78	11	"The Harem"	No. 102	Bill Roe	Marisa Tam	January 19, 2017	5.01
79	12	"Natalie Luca"	No. 184	Michael Watkins	Noah Schechter	February 2, 2017	5.05
80	13	"Isabella Stone"	No. 34	Andrew McCarthy	Taylor Martin	February 9, 2017	4.91
81	14	"The Architect"	No. 107	Christine Gee	Chap Taylor, Dave Metzger	February 16, 2017	4.76
82	15	"The Apothecary"	No. 59	Michael Caracciolo	Teleplay by : Marisa Tam; Story by : Brian Studler	February 23, 2017	4.98
83	16	"Dembe Zuma"	No. 10	Jean de Segonzac	Brandon Margolis, Brandon Sonnier	April 20, 2017	4.88
84	17	"Requiem"	None	Terrence O'Hara	Daniel Cerone	April 20, 2017	4.90
85	18	"Philomena"	No. 61	Michael Watkins	Peter Noah	April 27, 2017	4.86
86	19	"Dr. Bogdan Krilov"	No. 29	Don Thorin	Teleplay by : Lukas Reiter, John Eisendrath, Jon Bokenkamp; Story by : Brian Studler, Marisa Tam	May 4, 2017	4.82
87	20	"The Debt Collector"	No. 46	Bill Roe	Teleplay by : Kim Newton, Daniel Cerone; Story by : Jon Bokenkamp, Lukas Reiter	May 11, 2017	4.87
88	21	"Mr. Kaplan"	No. 4	Don Thorin	Teleplay by : John Eisendrath; Story by : Lukas Reiter, J. R. Orci	May 18, 2017	4.94
89	22	"Mr. Kaplan: Conclusion"	No. 4	Michael Watkins	Teleplay by : Jon Bokenkamp, John Eisendrath, Daniel Cerone; Story by : Lukas Reiter, J. R. Orci	May 18, 2017	4.92

=== Season 5 (2017–18) ===
No. overall	No. in season	Title	Blacklist guide	Directed by	Written by	Original release date	US viewers (millions)
90	1	"Smokey Putnum"	No. 30	Bill Roe	Jon Bokenkamp & John Eisendrath	September 27, 2017	6.39
91	2	"Greyson Blaise"	No. 37	Don Thorin	Lukas Reiter & Jon Bokenkamp	October 4, 2017	5.87
92	3	"Miss Rebecca Thrall"	No. 76	Adam Weisinger	Jonathan Shapiro & Taylor Martin	October 11, 2017	5.79
93	4	"The Endling"	No. 44	Michael Watkins	Noah Schechter	October 18, 2017	5.46
94	5	"Ilyas Surkov"	No. 54	Kurt Kuenne	Brandon Margolis & Brandon Sonnier	October 25, 2017	5.23
95	6	"The Travel Agency"	No. 90	Terrence O'Hara	Carla Kettner	November 1, 2017	5.25
96	7	"The Kilgannon Corporation"	No. 48	Jean de Segonzac	Lukas Reiter	November 8, 2017	5.04
97	8	"Ian Garvey"	No. 13	Bill Roe	John Eisendrath & Jon Bokenkamp	November 15, 2017	5.89
98	9	"Ruin"	None	Michael Caracciolo	Sean Hennen	January 3, 2018	6.02
99	10	"The Informant"	No. 118	Paul Holahan	Noah Schechter	January 10, 2018	6.16
100	11	"Abraham Stern"	No. 100	Andrew McCarthy	Teleplay by : Jon Bokenkamp & John Eisendrath; Story by : Dave Metzger & Jon Bokenkamp	January 17, 2018	6.49
101	12	"The Cook"	No. 56	Solvan "Slick" Naim	Peter Noah	January 31, 2018	6.11
102	13	"The Invisible Hand"	No. 63	Andrew McCarthy	Jonathan Shapiro & Lukas Reiter	February 7, 2018	6.35
103	14	"Mr. Raleigh Sinclair III"	No. 51	Christine Gee	Kelli Johnson	February 28, 2018	5.68
104	15	"Pattie Sue Edwards"	No. 68	Donald Thorin, Jr.	Carla Kettner	March 7, 2018	5.69
105	16	"The Capricorn Killer"	No. 19	Bill Roe	Taylor Martin	March 14, 2018	5.55
106	17	"Anna-Gracia Duerte"	No. 25	Michael Caracciolo	Lukas Reiter & Jonathan Shapiro	April 4, 2018	5.38
107	18	"Zarak Mosadek"	No. 23	Terrence O'Hara	Sean Hennen	April 11, 2018	5.15
108	19	"Ian Garvey: Conclusion"	No. 13	Cort Hessler	Carla Kettner & Katie Bockes	April 25, 2018	5.24
109	20	"Nicholas T. Moore"	No. 110	Solvan "Slick" Naim	Jon Bokenkamp & Lukas Reiter	May 2, 2018	5.54
110	21	"Lawrence Dane Devlin"	No. 26	Bethany Rooney	Carla Kettner & Sean Hennen	May 9, 2018	4.96
111	22	"Sutton Ross"	No. 17	Bill Roe	John Eisendrath & Jon Bokenkamp & Lukas Reiter	May 16, 2018	5.18

=== Season 6 (2019) ===
No. overall	No. in season	Title	Blacklist guide	Directed by	Written by	Original release date	US viewers (millions)
112	1	"Dr. Hans Koehler"	No. 33	Bill Roe	Jon Bokenkamp & John Eisendrath	January 3, 2019	4.15
113	2	"The Corsican"	No. 20	Kurt Kuenne	John Eisendrath & Jon Bokenkamp	January 4, 2019	3.91
114	3	"The Pharmacist"	No. 124	Daniel Willis	Lukas Reiter	January 11, 2019	3.66
115	4	"The Pawnbrokers"	No. 146/147	Lin Oeding	Carla Kettner	January 18, 2019	4.04
116	5	"Alter Ego"	No. 131	John Terlesky	Sean Hennen & Lukas Reiter	February 1, 2019	3.68
117	6	"The Ethicist"	No. 91	Bill Roe	Taylor Martin	February 8, 2019	4.24
118	7	"General Shiro"	No. 116	Kurt Kuenne	Teleplay by : Jonathan Shapiro; Story by : Jonathan Shapiro & Lukas Reiter	February 15, 2019	3.59
119	8	"Marko Jankowics"	No. 58	Bill Roe	Lukas Reiter	February 22, 2019	4.34
120	9	"Minister D"	No. 99	Michael Caracciolo	Noah Schechter & Jonathan Shapiro	February 22, 2019	3.97
121	10	"The Cryptobanker"	No. 160	Terrence O'Hara	Kelli Johnson	March 8, 2019	3.82
122	11	"Bastien Moreau"	No. 20	Andrew McCarthy	Jon Bokenkamp & John Eisendrath	March 15, 2019	3.36
123	12	"Bastien Moreau: Conclusion"	No. 20	Christine Gee	John Eisendrath & Jon Bokenkamp & Lukas Reiter	March 22, 2019	4.18
124	13	"Robert Vesco"	No. 9	Adam Weisinger	Michael Perri	March 29, 2019	4.33
125	14	"The Osterman Umbrella Company"	No. 6	Bill Roe	Sean Hennen	March 29, 2019	4.00
126	15	"Olivia Olson"	No. 115	Stephanie Marquardt	Lukas Reiter	April 5, 2019	3.62
127	16	"Lady Luck"	No. 69	Bill Roe	T Cooper & Allison Glock-Cooper	April 12, 2019	3.57
128	17	"The Third Estate"	No. 136	Andrew McCarthy	Katie Bockes	April 19, 2019	4.04
129	18	"The Brockton College Killer"	No. 92	Lisa Robinson	Sam Christopher	April 26, 2019	4.09
130	19	"Rassvet"	None	John Terlesky	Sean Hennen	April 26, 2019	3.95
131	20	"Guillermo Rizal"	No. 128	Cort Hessler	Noah Schechter	May 3, 2019	4.34
132	21	"Anna McMahon"	No. 60	Michael Caracciolo	Taylor Martin & Kelli Johnson	May 10, 2019	4.03
133	22	"Robert Diaz"	No. 15	Bill Roe	Jon Bokenkamp & John Eisendrath & Lukas Reiter	May 17, 2019	4.46

=== Season 7 (2019–20) ===
No. overall	No. in season	Title	Blacklist guide	Directed by	Written by	Original release date	US viewers (millions)
134	1	"Louis T. Steinhil"	No. 27	Bill Roe	John Eisendrath & Jon Bokenkamp	October 4, 2019	4.05
135	2	"Louis T. Steinhil: Conclusion"	No. 27	Cort Hessler	Lukas Reiter	October 11, 2019	3.78
136	3	"Les Fleurs Du Mal"	No. 151	Lisa Robinson	Kelli Johnson & Taylor Martin	October 18, 2019	3.57
137	4	"Kuwait"	None	Stephanie Marquardt	Sean Hennen	October 25, 2019	3.61
138	5	"Norman Devane"	No. 138	Kurt Kuenne	Noah Schechter	November 1, 2019	3.94
139	6	"Dr. Lewis Powell"	No. 130	Christine Gee	Sam Christopher	November 8, 2019	4.19
140	7	"Hannah Hayes"	No. 125	Adam Weisinger	Daniel Cerone	November 15, 2019	3.98
141	8	"The Hawaladar"	No. 162	Paul Holahan	Jon Bokenkamp & Lukas Reiter	November 22, 2019	3.91
142	9	"Orion Relocation Services"	No. 159	Stephanie Marquardt	Sean Hennen & Taylor Martin	December 6, 2019	3.67
143	10	"Katarina Rostova"	No. 3	Daniel Willis	Daniel Cerone	December 13, 2019	3.87
144	11	"Victoria Fenberg"	No. 137	Bill Roe	T Cooper & Allison Glock-Cooper	March 20, 2020	5.38
145	12	"Cornelius Ruck"	No. 155	John Terlesky	Lukas Reiter	March 27, 2020	4.73
146	13	"Newton Purcell"	No. 144	Michael Caracciolo	Noah Schechter	April 3, 2020	4.67
147	14	"Twamie Ullulaq"	No. 126	Victor Nelli, Jr.	Daniel Cerone	April 10, 2020	4.86
148	15	"Gordon Kemp"	No. 158	Andrew Berger	Jonathan Shapiro & Lukas Reiter	April 17, 2020	4.83
149	16	"Nyle Hatcher"	No. 149	Tessa Blake	Katie Bockes	April 24, 2020	4.83
150	17	"Brothers"	None	Mahesh Pailoor	Sean Hennen	May 1, 2020	4.50
151	18	"Roy Cain"	No. 150	Daniel Willis	Aiah Samba	May 8, 2020	4.55
152	19	"The Kazanjian Brothers"	No. 156/157	Michael Caracciolo	Kelli Johnson & Sam Christopher	May 15, 2020	4.13

=== Season 8 (2020–21) ===
No. overall	No. in season	Title	Blacklist guide	Directed by	Written by	Original release date	US viewers (millions)
153	1	"Roanoke"	No. 139	Andrew McCarthy	Daniel Cerone	November 13, 2020	3.72
154	2	"Katarina Rostova: Conclusion"	No. 3	Stephanie Marquardt	Lukas Reiter	November 20, 2020	3.53
155	3	"16 Ounces"	None	Andrew McCarthy	John Eisendrath & Jon Bokenkamp & Lukas Reiter	January 22, 2021	3.27
156	4	"Elizabeth Keen"	No. 1	Cort Hessler	Sean Hennen	January 29, 2021	3.43
157	5	"The Fribourg Confidence"	No. 140	Andrew McCarthy	Noah Schechter	February 5, 2021	3.44
158	6	"The Wellstone Agency"	No. 127	Matthew McLoota	Kelli Johnson	February 12, 2021	3.44
159	7	"Chemical Mary"	No. 143	Christine Moore	Daniel Cerone	February 19, 2021	3.38
160	8	"Ogden Greeley"	No. 40	Michael Caracciolo	Lukas Reiter	February 26, 2021	3.57
161	9	"The Cyranoid"	No. 35	Andrew McCarthy	Allison Glock-Cooper & T Cooper	March 5, 2021	3.22
162	10	"Dr. Laken Perillos"	No. 70	Phil Bertelsen	Aiah Samba	March 12, 2021	3.30
163	11	"Captain Kidd"	No. 96	Andrew McCarthy	Sam Christopher	March 26, 2021	3.29
164	12	"Rakitin"	No. 28	Mahesh Pailoor	Lukas Reiter	April 2, 2021	3.29
165	13	"Anne"	None	Andrew McCarthy	Sean Hennen	April 16, 2021	3.53
166	14	"Misère"	None	Christine Gee	Jon Bokenkamp & John Eisendrath	April 23, 2021	3.44
167	15	"The Russian Knot"	None	Juan Avella	Katie Bockes	April 30, 2021	3.35
168	16	"Nicholas Obenrader"	No. 133	Daniel Willis	Taylor Martin	May 7, 2021	3.20
169	17	"Ivan Stepanov"	No. 5	Adam Weisinger	David Merritt	May 14, 2021	3.09
170	18	"The Protean"	No. 36	Michael Caracciolo	Justine Neubarth	May 21, 2021	3.27
171	19	"Balthazar 'Bino' Baker"	No. 129	Christine Moore	Lukas Reiter	May 28, 2021	3.33
172	20	"Godwin Page"	No. 141	John Terlesky	Lukas Reiter	June 4, 2021	3.16
173	21	"Nachalo"	None	Kurt Kuenne	John Eisendrath & Jon Bokenkamp & Lukas Reiter	June 16, 2021	2.35
174	22	"Konets"	None	John Terlesky	Jon Bokenkamp & John Eisendrath	June 23, 2021	2.24

=== Season 9 (2021–22) ===
No. overall	No. in season	Title	Blacklist guide	Directed by	Written by	Original release date	US viewers (millions)
175	1	"The Skinner"	No. 45	Christine Moore	John Eisendrath & Lukas Reiter	October 21, 2021	3.07
176	2	"The Skinner: Conclusion"	No. 45	Matthew McLoota	Lukas Reiter & John Eisendrath	October 28, 2021	2.81
177	3	"The SPK"	No. 178	Christine Moore	Daniel Cerone	November 4, 2021	3.09
178	4	"The Avenging Angel"	No. 49	Andrew McCarthy	Sean Hennen	November 11, 2021	2.99
179	5	"Benjamin T. Okara"	No. 183	Jono Oliver	Noah Schechter	November 18, 2021	2.94
180	6	"Dr. Roberta Sand, Ph.D."	No. 153	Andrew McCarthy	T Cooper & Allison Glock-Cooper	December 9, 2021	2.89
181	7	"Between Sleep and Awake"	None	Christine Moore	Taylor Martin	January 6, 2022	3.53
182	8	"Dr. Razmik Maier"	No. 168	Avi Youabian	Justine Neubarth	January 13, 2022	3.41
183	9	"Boukman Baptiste"	No. 164	Andrew McCarthy	David Merritt	January 20, 2022	3.43
184	10	"Arcane Wireless"	No. 154	Michael Caracciolo	Sam Christopher	February 25, 2022	2.94
185	11	"The Conglomerate"	No. 142	Adam Weisinger	Aiah Samba	March 4, 2022	2.72
186	12	"The Chairman"	No. 171	Bethany Rooney	Katie Bockes	March 18, 2022	2.63
187	13	"Genuine Models, Inc."	No. 176	Mahesh Pailoor	T Cooper & Allison Glock-Cooper	March 25, 2022	2.71
188	14	"Eva Mason"	No. 181	John Terlesky	Taylor Martin	April 1, 2022	2.92
189	15	"Andrew Kennison"	No. 185	Mahesh Pailoor	Lukas Reiter	April 8, 2022	3.06
190	16	"Helen Maghi"	No. 172	John Terlesky	Daniel Cerone	April 15, 2022	2.85
191	17	"El Conejo"	No. 177	Andrew McCarthy	Sean Hennen	April 22, 2022	3.26
192	18	"Laszlo Jankowics"	No. 180	Christine Gee	Lukas Reiter	April 29, 2022	3.09
193	19	"The Bear Mask"	None	Matthew McLoota	Noah Schechter	May 6, 2022	2.76
194	20	"Caelum Bank"	No. 169	Cort Hessler	Sean Hennen	May 13, 2022	2.77
195	21	"Marvin Gerard: Conclusion, Pt. 1"	No. 80	Christine Moore	Daniel Cerone	May 20, 2022	2.70
196	22	"Marvin Gerard: Conclusion, Pt. 2"	No. 80	Cort Hessler	Lukas Reiter	May 27, 2022	2.82

=== Season 10 (2023) ===
No. overall	No. in season	Title	Blacklist guide	Directed by	Written by	Original release date	US viewers (millions)
197	1	"The Night Owl"	None	Cort Hessler	Lukas Reiter	February 26, 2023	2.32
198	2	"The Whaler"	No. 165	Michael Caracciolo	Sean Hennen	March 5, 2023	1.76
199	3	"The Four Guns"	No. 199	Matthew McLoota	Katie Bockes	March 12, 2023	1.89
200	4	"The Hyena"	No. 200	John Terlesky	Daniel Cerone	March 19, 2023	1.72
201	5	"The Dockery Affair"	None	Ruben Garcia	T Cooper & Allison Glock-Cooper	March 26, 2023	1.78
202	6	"Dr. Laken Perillos: Conclusion"	No. 70	Michael Caracciolo	Noah Schechter	April 2, 2023	2.06
203	7	"The Freelancer: Pt. 2"	No. 145	Cort Hessler	Sam Christopher	April 9, 2023	2.12
204	8	"The Troll Farmer: Pt. 2"	No. 38	Jono Oliver	Taylor Martin	April 16, 2023	1.73
205	9	"The Troll Farmer: Pt. 3"	No. 38	Christine Gee	Lukas Reiter	April 23, 2023	1.69
206	10	"The Postman"	No. 173	Kevin Berlandi	Justine Neubarth	April 30, 2023	1.98
207	11	"The Man in the Hat"	None	Olenka Denysenko	Daniel Cerone	May 7, 2023	1.70
208	12	"Dr. Michael Abani"	No. 198	Andrew McCarthy	Noah Schechter	May 14, 2023	1.66
209	13	"The Sicilian Error of Color"	None	Mahesh Pailoor	T Cooper & Allison Glock-Cooper	May 21, 2023	1.55
210	14	"The Nowhere Bride"	No. 192	Bethany Rooney	Cristina Boada	May 28, 2023	1.89
211	15	"The Hat Trick"	None	Adam Weisinger	Katie Bockes & Sam Christopher	June 1, 2023	2.78
212	16	"Blair Foster"	No. 39	Saray Guidetti	Taylor Martin	June 1, 2023	2.27
213	17	"The Morgana Logistics Corporation"	No. 167	Andrew McCarthy	Aiah Samba	June 8, 2023	2.45
214	18	"Wormwood"	No. 182	Diego Klattenhoff	Sam Eisendrath	June 22, 2023	2.47
215	19	"Room 417"	None	Andrew McCarthy	James M. Feinberg	June 29, 2023	2.52
216	20	"Arthur Hudson"	None	Christine Moore	Sean Hennen	July 6, 2023	2.43
217	21	"Raymond Reddington: Pt. 1"	No. 00	Michael Caracciolo	Katie Bockes & Noah Schechter	July 13, 2023	2.81
218	22	"Raymond Reddington: Good Night"	No. 00	Michael Caracciolo	Lukas Reiter	July 13, 2023	2.64

== Special episodes ==
=== Behind The Blacklist (2021) ===
The first 22-minute special episode was made available exclusively on NBC show page on November 4, 2021, featuring a backstage of the show and a preview for Season 9.

No.	Title	Directed by	Original release date
S1	"Behind The Blacklist"	John Eisendrath	November 4, 2021
The present cast members take the viewers behind the scenes of the show, discussing the whole show for the past nine years with production designer Nicolas Lundy, makeupers Anthony Pepe and Angie Johnson, John Eisendrath, the scriptwriters (Daniel Cerone, Noah Schester, Taylor Martin and Alah Samba), costume designer, stunt coordinator Cort Hessler, and prop master Pier Baccaro, who have been working on the show from the early seasons. The cast members answer fan questions about the show and share a preview of an upcoming season.

=== Celebration episodes ===
Each time the show passes an episodic milestone, the cast and crew have a celebration on the set of the Task Force headquarters. Some moments of the celebration, along with remarks from the cast, are published on NBC's official website as web exclusive content.

No.	Title	Directed by	Original release date
S2	"100 Episode Celebration"	Jon Bokenkamp	January 18, 2018
The Blacklist cast holds its first celebration as they achieve a long-shot goal.
S3	"150 Episode Celebration"	John Eisendrath	May 7, 2020
As a milestone episode approaches, cast and crew of The Blacklist gather once again for a celebration.
S4	"200 Episode Celebration"	John Eisendrath	October 7, 2022
With the 200th episode filmed, another celebration is held. Besides showing the original cast, it introduced Anya Banerjee, ahead of season 10 premiere. Former cast member Amir Arison was also present, where he also hinted on a potential appearance in an upcoming season.
