= The Blacklist season 1 =

Season of television series

The Blacklist
- Season 1
- Season 1 DVD cover
- No. of episodes: 22

Release
- Original network: NBC
- Original release: September 23, 2013 – May 12, 2014

Season chronology
- Next → Season 2

The first season of the American crime thriller television series The Blacklist premiered on NBC on September 23, 2013. The season was produced by Davis Entertainment, Universal Television, and Sony Pictures Television, and the executive producers are Jon Bokenkamp, John Davis, John Eisendrath, John Fox, and Joe Carnahan.

== Premise ==
The first season introduces Raymond Reddington (James Spader), Elizabeth "Liz" Keen (Megan Boone) and the members of the Task Force, a multiagency law enforcement working group dedicated to hunting down Reddington. Reddington surrenders to the FBI and offers to identify and help capture the criminals he has worked with, whom he calls "The Blacklist", but only if he is allowed to work with Liz Keen, a rookie profiler at the FBI. He refuses to explain why Liz must be involved. The Reddington Task Force, led by Assistant Director Harold Cooper (Harry Lennix), becomes the lead law enforcement agency responsible for capturing or killing the members of the Blacklist at Reddington's behest (usually to Red's benefit), which causes conflicts, particularly for Special Agent Donald Ressler (Diego Klattenhoff), who was originally tasked with capturing Reddington. This is the only season for Meera Malik (Parminder Nagra), a CIA officer and member of the Task Force, who is killed in the season finale. The season also introduces series antagonist Milos Kirchoff (Peter Stormare), AKA Berlin, a former Russian KGB officer with a longstanding hatred of Reddington. A major subplot for the season is Elizabeth Keen's discovery that her husband Tom Keen (Ryan Eggold), a schoolteacher to all appearances, is actually a covert operative with an unknown agenda and Liz's efforts to discover who he actually is and who sent him. A second subplot involves the Cabal, a shadowy multinational group that holds positions of influence in government and business, and their interest in Reddington's activities. The Cabal is usually represented by Alan Fitch (Alan Alda), the Deputy Director of National Intelligence, who tries to maintain a civil relationship with Reddington despite the Cabal's misgivings while trying to determine what Reddington actually knows.

== Cast ==
=== Main cast ===
- James Spader as Raymond "Red" Reddington
- Megan Boone as FBI Special Agent Elizabeth Keen
- Diego Klattenhoff as FBI Special Agent Donald Ressler
- Ryan Eggold as Tom Keen
- Harry Lennix as FBI Assistant Director Harold Cooper
- Parminder Nagra as Meera Malik

=== Recurring cast ===
- Amir Arison as Aram Mojtabai, a quirky and skilled technician who regularly assists the FBI.
- Charles Baker as Grey (Newton Phillips), Red's aide.
- Hisham Tawfiq as Dembe Zuma, Red's trusted bodyguard.
- Deborah S. Craig as Luli Zheng, Red's other bodyguard who usually handles finances.
- Jane Alexander as Diane Fowler, the head of the FBI's counterterrorism unit.
- Alan Alda as Alan Fitch, a member of a mysterious government organization that has come in contact with Red.
- Susan Blommaert as Mr. Kaplan, who is actually a woman and Red's personal "cleaner".
- Graeme Malcolm as "The Man with the Apple", an unnamed man in charge of the surveillance of the Keen household.
- Rachel Brosnahan as Lucy Brooks (alias Jolene Parker), a woman working for Berlin who weaves her way into the Keens' life.
- Lance Reddick as The Cowboy, a bounty hunter hired by Red to track down Jolene Parker/Lucy Brooks.
- Emily Tremaine as Audrey Bidwell, Ressler's former fiancée.
- Peter Stormare as Milos Kirchoff, AKA "Berlin", a former member of the KGB and an escaped convict.
- Dikran Tulaine as Max, a skilled bomb maker and longtime acquaintance of Red's

== Episodes ==
No. overall	No. in season	Title	Blacklist guide	Directed by	Written by	Original release date	US viewers (millions)
1	1	"Pilot"	N/A	Joe Carnahan	Jon Bokenkamp	September 23, 2013	12.58
Wanted fugitive Raymond "Red" Reddington (Spader) turns himself in to the FBI and offers to help them find Ranko Zamani (Jamie Jackson), a terrorist, on the condition he talks only to new profiler Elizabeth Keen (Boone). After being informed that Zamani intends to kidnap the daughter of General Daniel Ryker (Chance Kelly), Elizabeth picks her up, only for her convoy to be ambushed and the girl taken. Furthermore, Zamani breaks into Elizabeth's house and stabs her husband Tom (Eggold). As Tom recovers, Zamani meets with Red and informs him of Tom's injury, which Red apparently ordered. The meeting turns out to be a setup, and Agent Donald Ressler (Klattenhoff) kills Zamani. Elizabeth realises that Zamani intends to detonate a chemical bomb strapped to Ryker's daughter. Elizabeth finds the girl in a zoo, and Red sends an associate to disarm the device. Red then reveals that he has intelligence to help the FBI find unknown threats he has compiled on a "blacklist" gathered over the years. Later, as Elizabeth cleans her husband's blood off the carpet, she finds stashed under the floorboards a box containing money, a gun, and several fake passports bearing Tom's photograph. Red phones her and inquires about this discovery, which leaves her puzzled.
2	2	"The Freelancer"	No. 145	Jace Alexander	Jon Bokenkamp	September 30, 2013	11.35
Red alerts Elizabeth about a location and time where an unknown terrorist action will occur. Following a train derailment at the site, which Red believes to be the work of an assassin known as "The Freelancer", he and Elizabeth learn of the assassin's next target: Floriana Campo (Isabella Rossellini), a humanitarian working to end sex slavery by cartel gangs. The two attend one of Campo's charity events, where Red identifies the Freelancer, whom Ressler apprehends. The Freelancer confesses that he is just a decoy Red hired to poison Campo. It is revealed that Red knew Campo was a fraud; she is actually running a sex slavery ring and uses the charity to eliminate competition. Meanwhile, as part of Red's immunity agreement, CIA agent Meera Malik (Nagra) is assigned to his security detail. Tom is released from the hospital, and Elizabeth places his box back under the floorboards where she found it; she later views a recording of Tom speaking of his love for her during an adoption hearing.
3	3	"Wujing"	No. 84	Michael Watkins	Lukas Reiter	October 7, 2013	11.18
High-profile Chinese criminal Wujing (Chin Han) asks Red for help to decrypt a message from a CIA agent who was murdered in Shanghai. Red appoints Elizabeth to go undercover as a master decrypter, and they arrive at Wujing's underground base in the States. With help from a CIA-provided device, Elizabeth decrypts the message of Wujing's target, architect and CIA asset Henry Cho, who is currently located in Washington, D.C. As Red and Elizabeth accompany Wujing's gang in escaping from the FBI, Ressler and Malik race to save Cho and his son from Wujing's assassins. Elizabeth plants her tracker on Wujing's car, leading to his arrest. Red reveals that he chose Elizabeth to work with him because of her father, but he supplies no further details. Meanwhile, Elizabeth requests a ballistics report on the gun from Tom's box. The results are classified as it was involved with a high-profile homicide. An unknown party sets up surveillance in Elizabeth's house, characterized by their leader who eats an apple every time. Red opens the letter containing Wujing's payment—it's just a sheet of paper with the number 042983 on it.
4	4	"The Stewmaker"	No. 161	Vince Misiano	Patrick Massett & John Zinman	October 14, 2013	10.93
Elizabeth testifies against drug lord Hector Lorca (Clifton Collins, Jr.) when a vital witness is kidnapped. Red believes the witness was taken by "The Stewmaker" (Tom Noonan), a chemical expert who uses chemicals to dissolve his victims, who is also believed to have been responsible for countless disappearances. Elizabeth appeals to Lorca to help capture the Stewmaker, only to become the Stewmaker's captive. Red and Ressler are forced to work together; Ressler poses as an inside man when they meet with Lorca to obtain contact information for the Stewmaker. Meanwhile, Elizabeth is being tortured by the Stewmaker with injected chemicals. Red finds the Stewmaker's hideout, saves Elizabeth, and kills him by pushing him into the chemical bath the Stewmaker had prepared for Elizabeth. Red also steals a photograph from the picture album containing all the Stewmaker's victims. Elizabeth tries to find out something about the homicide perpetrated with her husband's hidden weapon and finds out when and where it occurred—in Boston, while she was there with Tom, who said he had a job interview at the hotel where the murder occurred.
5	5	"The Courier"	No. 85	Nick Gomez	John C. Kelley	October 21, 2013	10.44
A courier (Robert Knepper) is scheduled to deliver a valuable shipment to an Iranian spy. Following a car chase, Elizabeth and Malik manage to arrest the courier, and they learn he has imprisoned Seth Nelson, an NSA analyst. Nelson is entombed and only has a limited amount of air left. While the FBI searches for him, the courier escapes. Red coerces the courier's contact to help find him, and with that information, Malik and Ressler eventually track the Courier and then kill him in self-defence. Elizabeth and Red, meanwhile, find and save Seth. In gratitude, Seth gives Red documents regarding the high-profile murder Elizabeth suspected Tom was involved in, and Red sends them to her. Meanwhile, at home, Tom discovers the box and wants to talk to Elizabeth about it. They are unaware that their house is bugged with cameras and listening devices and that they are being watched.
6	6	"Gina Zanetakos"	No. 152	Adam Arkin	Wendy West	October 28, 2013	10.51
After Tom confronts Liz about the box, and she produces the photo of him in Boston, where the murder took place, he claims he is innocent and insists that they turn it into the FBI so his name can be cleared. Elsewhere, Red informs Elizabeth and the FBI that the next name on the Blacklist is a beautiful and deadly corporate terrorist, Gina Zanetakos (Margarita Levieva), who he claims is Tom's lover. Elsewhere, Tom maintains his innocence while being interrogated. Soon, Liz realizes there is more than meets the eye when she discovers the passports containing Tom's face are forged, and he's possibly been set up. When Zanetakos says Red was behind the Boston incident, and Zanetakos has never seen Tom before, Liz tells Red the two of them are "done". The men watching Liz and Tom don't know whether Tom is innocent or not, but they are "sure he doesn't work for Reddington".
7	7	"Frederick Barnes"	No. 47	Michael Watkins	J. R. Orci	November 4, 2013	10.34
After a chemical attack on a subway, Elizabeth and the FBI search for the man responsible. Elizabeth reluctantly seeks Red's help finding the next person on the blacklist, brilliant scientist Frederick Barnes (guest star Robert Sean Leonard). Barnes weaponized a deadly, but very rare, disease both in order to spread it so that the pharmaceutical industry would find it significant enough to fund its research and so that he could find someone immune, in order to produce an antidote for his son. Barnes succeeds in producing a potential antidote, but Liz kills him to prevent him from injecting it into his son. Meanwhile, Elizabeth wants nothing to do with Red outside of work, after he again implicates Tom, and he tries to stop Red from intruding into her personal life. Red shows great interest in a house which is for sale. He buys it, tells his bodyguards that he raised his family in it, and in order to "forget what happened here", he blows it up.
8	8	"General Ludd"	No. 109	Stephen Surjik	Amanda Kate Shuman	November 11, 2013	10.69
Elizabeth uncovers an elaborate plot to destroy the country's financial system when a new name on the blacklist, General Ludd (Justin Kirk), is revealed by Red. Red demands access to the ViCAP database in return for his help. Meanwhile, Tom informs Liz that her adoptive father Sam's cancer has returned. Due to the terror caused by General Ludd's group, Liz is unable to fly to her adoptive father Sam's (guest star William Sadler) hospital. Meanwhile, Red goes to the hospital and talks to Sam, who says he wants to tell Liz the truth about her family. Red tells Sam that Elizabeth must never know the truth, and then smothers Sam with a pillow after the latter expresses the wish that he not die a slow death from his disease. General Ludd is able to steal a hard drive containing the blueprints for newly minted U.S. currency. However, Red is able to capture him and steal the hard drive before turning Ludd over to the FBI. Elizabeth finds out that her father has died. Red uses his new access to ViCAP to look up the number the Chinese gave him (in episode 3); it's the number of a file on a woman named Lucy Brooks. Red comforts Elizabeth as she mourns her father.
9	9	"Anslo Garrick"	No. 16	Joe Carnahan	Story by : Joe Carnahan & Jason George; Teleplay by : Joe Carnahan	November 25, 2013	10.96
Anslo Garrick (Ritchie Coster), a terrorist who once worked with Red but parted from him on bad terms, initiates an attack in an effort to assassinate Red. During the raid, Donald is severely wounded from a shotgun blast to the leg. Red carries him to a bulletproof holding cell, and the two remain locked inside, as Red attends to Donald's wound. Elizabeth gets stuck in an elevator but frees herself. She works her way through the facility, taking out Garrick's men along the way until one of them knocks her unconscious. Garrick wants Red out of the safe room but needs the code to open it. Harold is the only one who knows the code but refuses to give it to Garrick. Red is forced to watch as Garrick kills Luli. He begs Harold to open the cell, but to no avail. Garrick next puts a gun to Dembe's head, with Cooper still refusing to give the code. Dembe tells Red that he's not afraid to die and that they'll meet again. The two say goodbye to each other by reciting a verse from the Quran. A gunshot is heard as the episode cuts to black.
10	10	"Anslo Garrick Conclusion"	No. 16	Michael Watkins	Lukas Reiter & J. R. Orci	December 2, 2013	11.67
The gunshot heard at the end of the previous episode is revealed to have come from Aram, providing a distraction that spares Dembe. Elizabeth infiltrates the blacksite and disarms the signal jammers with Aram to call in backup but they are captured by Garrick. In an effort to save Elizabeth, Red blackmails Ressler into giving up the password, and surrenders to Garrick. Elizabeth escapes captivity during the getaway, and utilizing a contact Reddington named prior to her escape, a woman named "Mr. Kaplan" (Susan Blommaert), Elizabeth learns of an unidentified party providing surveillance on everyone in the task force. A discovery made by Aram leads Elizabeth to the surveillance team stationed in the building across the street from her place. While in captivity, Red resists torture and is evasive with talking to a former colleague (special guest star Alan Alda), who hired Garrick to capture him. He later manages to kill Garrick with a pair of surgical scissors and escapes before an FBI rescue team led by Elizabeth enters the scene. A hospitalized Ressler is visited by a former fiancee he alluded to in the previous episode, Audrey Bidwell; Reddington is wanted for capture by the task force. Red makes another phone call to Elizabeth, stating that he will be there for her when needed. Liz asks Red if he is her real father, but Red denies it, and gives another warning about Tom before disappearing.
11	11	"The Good Samaritan"	No. 106	Dan Lerner	Brandon Margolis & Brandon Sonnier	January 13, 2014	9.35
Red remains missing and conducts his own investigation to hunt down those who betrayed him during the Anslo Garrick incident. The entire FBI team is under investigation as internal affairs tries to find the mole. Aram is initially suspected, but Red is able to prove he was set up. Meanwhile, a serial killer from Liz's past, "The Good Samaritan" (guest star Frank Whaley), strikes again. Elizabeth is allowed to join the hunt for the killer, as Cooper knows Red will likely realize how much this unsolved case means to Elizabeth and reach out to help her. Soon Elizabeth discovers the victims are all linked through abusing a family member, and that the killer was likely an abuse victim himself. Though she finally kills the Good Samaritan, she gives the man's final near-victim (guest star Frank Pando) a warning to treat his wife better or she'll make him regret hurting her. Red confronts a financier named Henry Krueger (Victor Slezak) for betraying him and shoots him, forcing the wounded Kreuger to give up the name Newton Phillips, who is in fact Red's aide. Red later confronts Phillips for leaking his location to Garrick and kills him via suffocation even though he asked him to make it look like an accident. Red then visits Elizabeth to tell her that "his house is clean" now, but hers isn't, explaining that Phillips couldn't have pulled this off by himself and that there's another mole inside the unit.
12	12	"The Alchemist"	No. 101	Vince Misiano	Anthony Sparks	January 20, 2014	8.83
Red informs the team that "The Alchemist" (guest star Ryan O'Nan), a man who relies upon science to transform a person's DNA and their appearance into someone else's, has been contracted to protect a well-known mob informant and his wife. As the team goes undercover to catch him, Elizabeth finds herself on the hunt for an unlikely couple. Meanwhile Elizabeth and Tom find themselves at another bump in their relationship and Ressler debates whether or not he should give his ex-fiancee his blessing. Meanwhile, Red continued conducting more investigations of his own and discovers the identity of the FBI double agent: Meera. He later pays Meera a visit at her house with a loaded gun to interrogate her. Also, Lucy Brooks (Rachel Brosnahan), the woman Red was looking for in ViCAP, is shown with files about Liz and Tom, and she infiltrates the Keen's baby shower party, introducing herself as "Jolene Parker", a substitute teacher. She flirts with Tom and in the end, they visit an art exhibit together because Elizabeth is late from work.
13	13	"The Cyprus Agency"	No. 64	Michael Watkins	Lukas Reiter	January 27, 2014	10.17
After a recent spate of abductions of babies from their mothers, Red informs Elizabeth that the "Cyprus Agency" is the illegal adoption organization responsible. More or less coincidentally, Elizabeth and Tom contemplate adoption of their own which fuels Elizabeth to track down the organization's CEO, Owen Mallory (Campbell Scott). Ultimately, the task force discovers the Cyprus Agency's secret: it kidnaps young women and keeps them in captivity as breeders for the babies it puts up for adoption, and that Mallory is the father of all the children. Meanwhile, Meera willingly aids Red in his investigation for the mole. Covertly using Cooper's badge, Meera's intelligence leads Red to Diane Fowler as the ringleader of the leak, prompting him to kill Fowler in her own home. She tells him that she knows about "that day", about what happened to his family. But Red still kills her, responding that he wants to know it more than anything in the world, but if she knows, someone else does also. He then calls Mr. Kaplan to clean up. In the end, Elizabeth finds herself unable to adopt a child as long as her marriage to Tom continues to suffer emotional strain. She is shown frustrated at home sitting in between baby stuff while Tom goes to see Jolene, the woman who was flirting with him.
14	14	"Madeline Pratt"	No. 73	Michael Zinberg	Jim Campolongo	February 24, 2014	11.18
In the backdrop of Elizabeth and Tom's struggle to adjust to backing out of the adoption, Madeline Pratt (Jennifer Ehle), a former professional and personal interest of Red's, enlists Red's help in stealing a statue called the Effigy of Ashtart in the Syrian embassy. The statue secretly contains coordinates for Soviet nuclear detonation codes, which has the interest of the Russian Mob. Red enlists Elizabeth's aid in the operation, with her posing as a grifter and an associate of Red's, only for the pair to be double-crossed by Pratt. Faking their capture, Red succeeds in getting the location of the Effigy and the coordinates from Pratt. The statue is secured and one of Pratt's allies is arrested. Pratt is able to free herself and steals a precious painting from Red. Meanwhile, Cooper presses Red on Diane Fowler's disappearance and timing of it, and later has a meeting with Agent Malik to discuss finding out what Red knows about it, convinced that he's involved. But Cooper's investigation into Fowler's disappearance is effectively stonewalled by Special Agent Walter Gary Martin of the D.C. Bureau, who says the orders "came from the top".
15	15	"The Judge"	No. 57	Peter Werner	Jonathan Shapiro & Lukas Reiter	March 3, 2014	11.01
When a former Assistant U.S. Attorney is found bedraggled and walking the street after being missing for 12 years, Red suspects he was a victim of "The Judge", a mysterious person that runs an underground operation dispensing "eye for an eye" justice on officials who have wrongly convicted people. Red gets Elizabeth going on that case, then tackles his own agenda in wanting to find out about the past of Lucy Brooks. Lucy, as it turns out, is Jolene, the woman seducing Tom at a teacher conference in Orlando. As Elizabeth works the case of The Judge (revealed to be a woman named Ruth Kipling, played by Dianne Wiest), a man named Alan Ray Rifkin is about to be executed for treason, and it is discovered that Cooper is the Federal agent who put him away. Cooper becomes The Judge's next target and is nearly electrocuted, until Red arrives with proof that Rifkin really did commit the crimes for which he was executed. Cooper is released, The Judge is apprehended, and later sent to prison. When Cooper suggests Red brought him this case to gain leverage on him, Red replies that "a war is coming", and he may need Cooper's help. Back in Orlando, Tom declines "Jolene's" offer of an affair, proclaiming his love for Elizabeth. Jolene/Lucy then gets Tom to admit that Elizabeth isn't just his wife—she's also his target.
16	16	"Mako Tanida"	No. 83	Michael Watkins	Story by : Joe Carnahan; Teleplay by : John Eisendrath & Jon Bokenkamp & Patrick Massett & John Zinman	March 17, 2014	10.97
Mako Tanida (Hoon Lee) escapes a Japanese prison and kills an FBI agent, claiming revenge for "collateral damage" caused by the FBI when they were after Red. After another FBI agent turns up dead in America, Ressler fears he may be next, as he was part of the team searching for Red back then. He grabs Audrey and attempts to take her somewhere safe, but his car is rammed by Tanida's driver. In the ensuing melee, Tanida shoots and kills Audrey. Ressler vows to take out Tanida, despite warnings from Cooper and Red to let other agents take it from here. Collaborating with an old FBI buddy named Bobby Jonica who was also on that task force, Ressler locates Tanida, but later learns that Bobby is the mysterious "Tensei" - the man who took over Tanida's crime operation while the latter was in prison. Bobby murdered Mako's brother, Aiko, and covered up his death in order to steal his identity. Lucy/Jolene announces plans to move in next to Tom and Elizabeth, but Tom later meets Lucy in a hideout, and the two discuss mutual, though possibly conflicting, plans to get to Red in order to provide an unknown entity named "Berlin" with answers. Tom convinces Lucy to call Liz and tell her the moving plan has been called off; then, he kills Jolene and her assailant. Ressler attempts to coerce Bobby into committing suicide before being stopped by Elizabeth, though Bobby ultimately does kill himself. Later at home, Ressler receives a gift from Reddington: a box containing Tanida's severed head. Later, Red looks at a picture of a young ballerina before watching a private showing of "Swan Lake", to which he has donated a large amount of money.
17	17	"Ivan"	No. 88	Randy Zisk	J.R. Orci & Amanda Kate Shuman	March 24, 2014	10.80
A programmer for the NSA is supposedly killed in a car crash, but an investigation reveals that his car was hacked. While investigating the programmer's death, the task force learns that the NSA's Tailored Access Operations unit was working on a prototype device called the "Skeleton Key", capable of hacking into the entire American electronics infrastructure. Reddington initially believes an elusive Russian hacker named Ivan (Mark Ivanir) was responsible for the theft, but a personal meeting with him reveals that Ivan never had any problems with the United States and is solely focused on the Russian government. Ivan claims that someone else has been masquerading as him. Further investigation into Ivan's claims leads the task force to high school student Harrison Lee, who was responsible for the theft of the Skeleton Key. Lee stole the key and used it in an attempt to begin a romantic relationship with the daughter of one of the Skeleton Key scientists. Elizabeth investigates the disappearance of Jolene/Lucy after being approached by Lucy's former parole officer. Elizabeth discovers Tom's makeshift headquarters after Aram traces the origin of Lucy's last voice message, but Tom has just torn down and burned all photos of Red and Elizabeth. He performs a sneak attack on Liz at the hideout, and flees before she can recognize him. In the aftermath of the Skeleton Key crisis, Elizabeth receives an email containing evidence gathered by the parole officer. In a photo of some trash taken in Tom's hideout, she sees an educational toy that she had given Tom the morning of the investigation. Finally, understanding Red's repeated warnings about Tom and upset by the recent revelation, Elizabeth turns to Red for emotional support. Red refurbishes an old music box whose song Elizabeth knows from her childhood and gives it to her as a gift.
18	18	"Milton Bobbit"	No. 135	Steven A. Adelson	Daniel Voll	March 31, 2014	11.39
A series of seemingly unconnected murder-suicides are attributed by Red to a life insurance claims adjuster named Milton Bobbit (Damian Young), who convinces terminally ill people to carry out the acts in exchange for financial rewards for their surviving family members. The murder victims are ultimately discovered to all be part of a clinical drug trial for type 2 diabetes that caused people to die, and Bobbit himself is found to be terminal. Elizabeth, Ressler and the team must catch up with Bobbit before he himself takes out the next victim: the doctor who headed up the trial. They manage to arrest the doctor and let Bobbit commit suicide. In Cooper's office, Red has a look at Bobbit's client list, which seems to matter a lot to him. Meanwhile, Tom proposes that he and Elizabeth renew their marriage vows, given all they've been through, and has his brother Craig (Peter Scanavino) officiate the ceremony. Craig pulls Tom aside and says he's certain Elizabeth knows the truth about him, but Tom isn't convinced. In their new safe house, Elizabeth demands answers from Red regarding Tom as well as Red's interest in her, but all Red will say is that he's watched her closely ever since Tom came into her life. After Red gets some DNA results on Tom, he determines that Craig (real name "Christopher") is not Tom's brother. Elizabeth traps Chris in his hotel room and tries to get answers. Tom calls Chris while Elizabeth, Red and Dembe are in the room, and mentions "Berlin". Red demands to know what's in Berlin, but a frightened-looking Chris says he cannot say anything. After Red threatens that he'll find a way to make him talk, Chris hurls himself through the hotel room's window, falling to his death, after which Tom attempts to convince Liz that Craig had to fly home. Elizabeth has her own hideout where she watches surveillance footage of herself and Tom, which Red gave her. With that, she finds a hidden key.
19	19	"The Pavlovich Brothers"	Nos. 119-122	Paul Edwards	Elizabeth Benjamin	April 21, 2014	11.24
Xiao Ping Li, a scientist involved in a chemical weapons project known as White Fog, is drugged at an immunization centre in China and whisked to Washington, D.C., by CIA agents for interrogation. The Pavlovich brothers specialize in abductions of high-value targets, including General Ryker's daughter (from episode 1). According to Red, they are in town planning their next hit, Li. Meanwhile, Tom discovers that Elizabeth knows his secret, informs his people and flees. While the team tries to locate the Pavlovich brothers' target, Red makes a deal with the brothers to abduct and deliver Tom to Elizabeth. Elizabeth tries to torture Tom into revealing his bosses, but he quickly turns the tables and corners her. After explaining that his job never included hurting her, he claims to be "one of the good guys" and tells Elizabeth that Red isn't at all who he seems to be. Before fleeing, Tom tells Elizabeth about a safe deposit box, the key to which she already found in the lamp. With Tom in their view, Red instructs Dembe not to capture him again, but rather follow his tail. The next day, Elizabeth opens the deposit box and is shocked when she looks at the photo inside.
20	20	"The Kingmaker"	No. 42	Karen Gaviola	J. R. Orci & Lukas Reiter	April 28, 2014	10.85
After a politician in Prague is framed for a murder, Red suspects it's the work of The Kingmaker (guest star Linus Roache), a strategist behind the rise of some of the world's most powerful politicians. Red is seen meeting with an ally about the Prague matter, and the man tells him that the recent news of a siege on Red's interests is causing several key people to start distancing themselves. Elizabeth views the photos that Tom had led her to, which show Red at the hospital where her adoptive father, Sam, had died. She confronts Red about it, but he steers her toward the more urgent matter of The Kingmaker being in the U.S. Elizabeth and the team are able to uncover a plot by The Kingmaker to run the car of a New York state assemblyman off a bridge, making him look like a hero by saving his family. This puts him in the best position to win a special election for a Senate seat, which The Kingmaker vacates by killing the senator. Alarms go off in the home where the murder is committed, with Ressler and Liz entering the home. The Kingmaker attacks and chokes Elizabeth before being fatally shot by Ressler. Red meets with Fitch, telling him his businesses are under attack and suggesting it's a mutual problem and that they should cooperate against their common enemy. Fitch meets with members of his global alliance, then tells Red they have chosen not to ally themselves with him despite Red's threats to expose them. Elizabeth phones Red to inform him about The Kingmaker. Red says he wants 10 minutes with the man to find out who ordered the Prague incident, but Liz has to tell him that The Kingmaker is dead. Elizabeth then visits Red about her adoptive father, and Red finally admits he killed Sam. Elizabeth calls Red a "monster" and says the two of them are through.
21	21	"Berlin"	No. 8	Michael Zinberg	John Eisendrath & Jon Bokenkamp	May 5, 2014	10.47
Elizabeth tells Ressler and then the FBI her story about Tom. In the midst of a virus outbreak inside a bank, Elizabeth refuses to work with Red and sends Cooper her resignation, informing him that Red killed her father. Red tries to explain to her that the outbreak is connected to Tom and asks if her anger towards him (Red) is more important than putting lives at risk. Elizabeth agrees to work on the case but declares it will be her last. Red is certain that the Cullen virus is part of a plan to kill him, as well as being capable of creating a widespread epidemic. Red and Elizabeth meet with Dr. Sanders (John Glover), an expert on the virus, who is also a mental patient. The conversation gets loony when Dr. Sanders speaks of Space Agent UD-4126 and omens of the Cullen virus leading to the apocalypse. Elizabeth storms out, accusing Red of using the visit as a diversion to change her mind about quitting. Meanwhile, Cooper is given an ultimatum by his superiors: if Elizabeth walks, Red no longer has immunity, and the task force is no more. Elizabeth learns that Dr. Sanders had created an antidote for the virus, and the team suspects that he was working with another doctor from outside the mental institution. Elizabeth pays Dr. Sanders another visit and notices the nurse's ID badge number, UD-4126. This leads to one Dr. Nikolaus Vogel (Brennan Brown). Once he's arrested, he refuses to talk to Elizabeth except to warn her about Berlin's coming. Elizabeth had laced his drinking water with the virus, and used the antidote to blackmail him into talking. Using Tom's code book—which Red had given her earlier as an "olive branch" - Elizabeth discovers connections among several members of Red's Blacklist, deciphering that he knew someone was targeting his interests, but not specifically who it is. He's been using his relationship with the FBI task force to systematically eliminate his enemies and draw Berlin out of hiding. Dr. Vogel gives up the names of 5 people involved in a prison plane transport, all airport employees infected with Cullen. Elizabeth begins to have a change of heart about leaving, but Cooper tells her it's too late. She finds Red and warns him about the FBI's pursuit and his immunity. She begs him to run, but he refuses, asking about her sudden change of heart. Elizabeth goes on to tell him how much she wants to kill him for ruining her life, but that she also needs answers from him. He tells her that he needs things from her also, and that nothing is worse than losing her. It becomes apparent to both that they are stuck with each other. As Red surrenders himself, the prison transport plane flies overhead and crashes. The war has begun.
22	22	"Berlin Conclusion"	No. 8	Michael Watkins	Story by : Richard D'Ovidio; Teleplay by : John Eisendrath & Jon Bokenkamp & Lukas Reiter & J. R. Orci	May 12, 2014	10.44
It is revealed that some passengers on the plane were killed in the crash, some are in the hospital, and a few are at large. The members of the task force start being targeted. Agent Malik is killed, and Cooper is strangled and placed into a coma. A guard (Peter Stormare) who was severely injured in the crash is questioned in the hospital and tells a story of a man in prison whose enemy sent him parts of his dead daughter, one by one, until he managed to escape. Fitch meets with Red, saying that his organization has finally agreed to join forces with Red against Berlin, and he arranges to give Red an opportunity to escape from FBI custody. Red meets with Elizabeth, and they continue to try to find Berlin. Red encounters a man (Andrew Howard) believed to be Berlin and tortures him for information. Tom ambushes Elizabeth in her car and drags her into the room with a gun pointed to her head, imploring Red to give himself up. Red kills "Berlin" and inches closer to Tom. Tom shoots Red in the shoulder, prompting Liz to break free. Elizabeth and Tom scuffle, and he is shot by her. With his dying breath, Tom whispers something to Elizabeth. Red says that he realized the man he had just tortured and killed was not Berlin, who is instead revealed to be the injured guard the FBI questioned in the hospital. As Cooper recovers under Ressler's watch, Elizabeth and Ressler discover that Berlin escaped and is at large. When agents investigate the room where the bodies of Tom and the fake Berlin should be, Tom's body is gone. Liz meets with Red and says that Tom told her that her father is alive. Red assures Elizabeth that her father definitely died in a fire. Berlin walks the streets carrying a pocket watch with the picture of a little girl, with Red concurrently carrying the same picture that he recovered from the Stewmaker. The season ends with Red removing his shirt to treat his bullet wound, revealing burn scars on his back.

== Reception ==
The first season of The Blacklist received strong reviews from television critics. On Metacritic, the season has a score of 74 out of 100 based on reviews from 32 critics, indicating "generally favorable" reviews. The review aggregator website Rotten Tomatoes reports an 82% approval score based on 57 reviews, with an average rating of 7.2/10. The consensus reads: "James Spader is riveting as a criminal-turned-informant, and his presence goes a long way toward making this twisty but occasionally implausible crime procedural compelling".

David Wiegand of the San Francisco Chronicle said about the pilot: "You think you know this situation and how it will turn out, but there are surprising, yet entirely credible, twists throughout Monday's episode". Robert Bianco of USA Today said: "The Blacklist is a solid weekly crime show built around a genuine TV star. That's the kind of series the networks have to be able to pull off to survive. And with Spader in command, odds are NBC will". Tim Goodman of The Hollywood Reporter praised both Spader's performance and the procedural elements of the show: "There's an overarching element to the premise as well that makes it intriguing without making it overly complicated".

=== Ratings ===
No.	Title	Air date	Time slot (EST)	Ratings/Share (18–49)	Viewers (millions)	Viewers Rank (Week)	DVR 18–49	DVR Viewers (millions)	Total 18–49	Total Viewers (millions)
1	"Pilot"	September 23, 2013	Mondays; 10:00 pm	3.8/10	12.58	11	1.7	5.696	5.5	18.279
2	"The Freelancer (No. 145)"	September 30, 2013	Mondays; 10:00 pm	3.3/9	11.35	15	2.2	6.504	5.5	17.858
3	"Wujing (No. 84)"	October 7, 2013	Mondays; 10:00 pm	3.1/9	11.18	11	1.9	5.720	5.0	16.904
4	"The Stewmaker (No. 161)"	October 14, 2013	Mondays; 10:00 pm	3.0/8	10.93	15	2.0	5.524	5.0	16.452
5	"The Courier (No. 85)"	October 21, 2013	Mondays; 10:00 pm	3.0/8	10.44	19	2.0	6.204	5.0	16.641
6	"Gina Zanetakos (No. 152)"	October 28, 2013	Mondays; 10:00 pm	3.1/8	10.51	15	2.0	6.098	5.1	16.609
7	"Frederick Barnes (No. 47)"	November 4, 2013	Mondays; 10:00 pm	2.9/8	10.34	16	2.3	6.589	5.2	16.925
8	"General Ludd (No. 109)"	November 11, 2013	Mondays; 10:00 pm	3.0/8	10.69	16	2.1	6.326	5.1	17.014
9	"Anslo Garrick (No. 16)"	November 25, 2013	Mondays; 10:00 pm	3.0/8	10.96	13	2.1	6.375	5.1	17.339
10	"Anslo Garrick (No. 16) Conclusion"	December 2, 2013	Mondays; 10:00 pm	3.2/9	11.67	9	2.0	5.856	5.2	17.540
11	"The Good Samaritan (No. 106)"	January 13, 2014	Mondays; 10:00 pm	2.5/7	9.35	15	2.0	6.060	4.5	15.407
12	"The Alchemist (No. 101)"	January 20, 2014	Mondays; 10:00 pm	2.3/6	8.83	18	1.9	6.622	4.2	15.454
13	"The Cyprus Agency (No. 64)"	January 27, 2014	Mondays; 10:00 pm	2.5/7	10.17	16	2.1	6.668	4.6	16.839
14	"Madeline Pratt (No. 73)"	February 24, 2014	Mondays; 10:00 pm	3.1/9	11.18	11	1.9	6.353	5.0	17.532
15	"The Judge (No. 57)"	March 3, 2014	Mondays; 10:00 pm	2.7/8	11.01	10	1.9	5.879	4.6	16.891
16	"Mako Tanida (No. 83)"	March 17, 2014	Mondays; 10:00 pm	2.7/8	10.97	7	1.9	5.911	4.6	16.880
17	"Ivan (No. 88)"	March 24, 2014	Mondays; 10:00 pm	2.8/8	10.80	9	2.2	6.519	5.0	17.318
18	"Milton Bobbit (No. 135)"	March 31, 2014	Mondays; 10:00 pm	2.8/8	11.39	11	2.0	5.868	4.8	17.257
19	"The Pavlovich Brothers (Nos. 119–122)"	April 21, 2014	Mondays; 10:00 pm	2.8/8	11.24	4	2.1	6.510	4.9	17.753
20	"The Kingmaker (No. 42)"	April 28, 2014	Mondays; 10:00 pm	2.7/8	10.85	9	1.9	5.656	4.5	16.447
21	"Berlin (No. 8)"	May 5, 2014	Mondays; 10:00 pm	2.7/8	10.47	10	1.7	5.696	4.4	16.162
22	"Berlin (No. 8) Conclusion"	May 12, 2014	Mondays; 10:00 pm	2.6/7	10.44	11	2.0	5.853	4.6	16.297

== Accolades ==
Year	Award	Category	Nominee	Result
2014	ASCAP Film and Television Music Awards	Top TV Series	Dave Porter	Won
2014	Golden Globe Awards	Best Actor – Television Series Drama	James Spader	Nominated
2014	People's Choice Awards	Favorite New Television Drama	The Blacklist	Nominated
2014	Primetime Creative Arts Emmy Awards	Outstanding Stunt Coordination for a Drama Series, Miniseries, or Movie	The Blacklist	Won
2014	Saturn Awards	Best Network Television Series Release	The Blacklist	Nominated
2014	Saturn Awards	Best Actor in a Television Series	James Spader	Nominated
