= Tanida =

Tanida (written: 谷田) is a Japanese surname. Notable people with the surname include:

- Kinuko Tanida (谷田 絹子, 1939–2020), Japanese volleyball player
- Yasumasa Tanida (谷田 康真, born 1994), Japanese curler

== See also ==
- "Mako Tanida", an episode of the American television series The Blacklist
