= Justice (2006 TV series) =

2006 American legal drama series

- Genre: Legal drama
- Created by: Tyler Bensinger; David McNally
- Starring: Victor Garber; Kerr Smith; Rebecca Mader; Eamonn Walker
- Opening theme: "Lawyers, Guns and Money" by Warren Zevon
- Composer: Trevor Morris
- Country of origin: United States
- Original language: English
- No. of seasons: 1
- No. of episodes: 13 (1 unaired in the U.S.)

Production
- Executive producers: Tyler Bensinger; Jerry Bruckheimer; Jonathan Littman; Jonathan Shapiro
- Producers: Alfredo Barrios Jr. Timothy Marx; Patrick McKee
- Cinematography: Michael Bonvillain; Dermott Downs
- Editors: Jonathan Chibnall; Ray Daniels III; Steven Lang
- Running time: 60 minutes
- Production companies: Jerry Bruckheimer Television; Warner Bros. Television

Original release
- Network: Fox
- Release: August 30, 2006 – February 28, 2007

Justice was a short-lived American legal drama produced by Jerry Bruckheimer Television and Warner Bros. Television that aired on Fox from August 30, 2006 to February 28, 2007. The series also aired on Warner Channel in Latin America, in Brazil also was aired on Rede Globo, Nine Network in Australia, and on TV2 in New Zealand.

It first was broadcast on Wednesdays at 9:00 but, due to low ratings, it was rescheduled to Mondays at 9:00, in the hope viewers of the hit series Prison Break would stay tuned. On November 13, 2006, the show was put on hiatus, but two days later the network announced it was shifting it to Fridays at 8:00 to replace the canceled Vanished.

Fourteen episodes of the series were ordered, of which 13 episodes were produced. Twelve of the episodes of Justice have aired in the United States with the final episode airing in Mexico, the UK and Germany.

== Premise ==
Justice is about a team of lawyers from different backgrounds who work at the Los Angeles law firm of Trott, Nicholson, Tuller & Graves (TNT&G) and defend clients involved in controversial and newsworthy cases. While criminal defense is most common, other cases may strike the interest of the firm such as wrongful death and other civil cases. As the title implies, the viewer discovers whether or not "justice" has been served following the verdict, when what really transpired is revealed to the audience.

== Cast and characters ==
=== Ron Trott ===
Portrayed by Victor Garber

He is the head of TNT&G. His overbearing personality and gleefully amoral approach to the practice of law make him exasperating to many—including juries—but he is a skilled, media-savvy lawyer who shares a good rapport and working relationship with his other TNT&G partners. He also has some degree of ethics despite his amorality; when he realizes that the woman he had once loved did indeed murder her son in cold blood he is legitimately heartbroken and is upset when he realizes they helped a guilty man escape justice.

He is the face seen on every media talk show in the country—and he wants it that way. He is great at landing a client, spinning a case and getting his way, but juries hate him. It was his inspiration and win-at-all-cost mentality that brought this group of brilliant, ego-driven attorneys together.

=== Tom Nicholson ===
Portrayed by Kerr Smith

He is an idealistic trial lawyer. A native of a small Nebraska town, Hastings, he had a younger sister who died in her late teens. He is only comfortable defending clients whom he believes to be innocent. His youth and appealing demeanor as the all-American face of "not guilty" are cited by Ron as the reason that Tom (rather than Ron himself) should lead most trial representations. In spite of this, he did have some degree of prejudice against people who aren't quite "normal" (as seen in the episode Crucified); after this results in an innocent teenager getting convicted he becomes filled with guilt and wants to handle the appeal despite not being an appealate lawyer.

Tom is a brilliant litigator whose everyman, earnest manner makes him a Foil to Ron. Trials are won and lost on the art of battle in the courtroom, and Tom is a master of his domain. He has expressed interest in Alden.

=== Alden Tuller ===
Portrayed by Rebecca Mader

She processes the physical evidence and hires experts for courtroom demonstrations. She frequently goes to Dr. Shaw for insight. Although she is unmarried, Alden wears a wedding ring in court in the belief that it helps jurors trust her. Unlike Tom, she prefers to believe that her firm's clients are guilty rather than innocent, so she won't be disappointed if they lose. In spite of this, she does have somewhat of a softer side for teenage clients, and is more willing to believe in their innocence (during the two episodes where the firm defends teenage clients Alden is in charge of preparing them for trial and looking after them.)

=== Luther Graves ===
Portrayed by Eamonn Walker

Graves is a former prosecutor turned defense lawyer. A leader in the African-American political community, he is well-connected, politically motivated and in possession of an uncanny ability to take a step back and assess the merits of a case from both the prosecution's and the defense's perspective—anticipating the story each side will tell. His role at TNT&G frequently centers on predicting the moves of the prosecution (or the opposing party in civil suits). In "Prior Convictions" he is forced to defend a man he had previously convicted; over the course of the episode he learns that the man, Joshua Morton, had been convicted more because of his lawyer's incompetence and the jury's prejudice than anything Graves had done, and later is presented with proof that Joshua could not have committed the crime. He is fluent in Spanish, as seen in the show's last episode.

=== Recurring cast and characters ===
- Katherine LaNasa as Suzanne Fulcrum, the host of a cable news program called American Crime. Her coverage of the case in question is featured in several episodes. Suzanne has something of a love/hate relationship with Trott. While she likes the popularity of the cases tried by his firm, she despises his attempts to use her show to his advantage.
- Aunjanue Ellis as Miranda Lee, a jury consultant frequently employed by TNT&G. She possesses an uncanny insight into the mindset of potential jurors, and her input is often invaluable as the firm develops its legal strategies.
- Mark Deklin as Dr. Matthew Shaw, a scientific expert hired by TNT&G to help with crime recreations.
- Erin Daniels as Betsy Harrison, an ex-LAPD employee who worked with Luther back when he was a DA. She currently works as the firm's private investigator. Appears in "Addicts", "Crucified", and "Shotgun".
- Will Owens as Paralegal Pete, a member of the legal team at TNT&G. Appears in "Pretty Woman," "Behind the Orange Curtain," and "Wrongful Death."
- Paul Schulze as J.D. Keller, the District Attorney often is on the opposing side of cases tried by TNT&G. Appears in "Pretty Woman", "Crucified", and "Prior Conviction".
- Dahlia Salem as Susan Hale, a District Attorney on the opposing side of a few cases tried by TNT&G. Appears in "Prior Conviction", "Shotgun", and "Christmas Party".

== Episodes ==
No.	Title	Directed by	Written by	Original release date	Prod. code	Nielsen Rating
1	"Pilot"	David McNally	Tyler Bensinger, Jonathan Shapiro, David McNally	August 30, 2006	276013	2.9/8
The firm represents a husband and father (guest star Sam Trammell) - accused of bludgeoning his wife to death with a golf club - who has been convicted by the media before his trial even begins. They try to prove it was accidental, not intentional.
2	"Pretty Woman"	David McNally	Jonathan Shapiro	September 6, 2006	3T5101	5.5/9
The firm represents a poor college student (guest star Amanda Seyfried) accused of stabbing a Hollywood music producer to death in a hotel room. She insists it was self defense, but things keep getting covered up.
3	"Behind the Orange Curtain"	Karen Gaviola	Terri Kopp, Courtney Kemp Agboh	September 13, 2006	3T5103	4.9/8
When the bride of a wealthy real estate developer (guest star Teddy Sears) disappears the day before their wedding, the firm represents the bartender suspected of killing her before her body is even found.
4	"Addicts"	Paul McCrane	Lauren Schmidt, Jonathan Shapiro	September 20, 2006	3T5104	3.7/6
The firm represents a wild child (guest star Nikki Reed) who happens to be a close friend of Tom's when she is accused of murdering her former boyfriend at a posh celebrity rehab center.
5	"Wrongful Death"	Anthony Hemingway	Alfredo Barrios Jr.	September 27, 2006	3T5102	4.6/7
When a single mother is killed on a theme park roller coaster, TNT&G represents her orphaned daughter (guest star Makenzie Vega) in the wrongful death civil case against the giant conglomerate that owns the park. But was her death an accident, or suicide?
6	"Crucified"	Jeffrey Hunt	Craig O'Neill, Jason Tracey, Jonathan Shapiro	October 23, 2006	3T5105	4.2/6
The firm takes on the case of a teenage outcast (guest star Bug Hall) charged with killing the school bully in a most unusual fashion. Tom doesn't believe him, but will he reconsider before it's too late?
7	"Death Spiral"	Dermott Downs	Jonathan Shapiro, Courtney Kemp Agboh	October 30, 2006	3T5107	4.3/7
A millionaire's son and his blue-collar girlfriend die in a small-engine plane crash; the firm represents the girl's parents (guest stars Kate Burton and Michael Dempsey) in a wrongful-death suit against the wealthy matriarch, but not for money.
8	"Shark Week"	Danny Cannon	Alfredo Barrios Jr.	November 6, 2006	3T5106	3.8/6
The firm navigates uncharted waters when it represents a brash internet tycoon (guest star Matt Letscher) and his truckling best friend (guest star MacKenzie Astin) after the half-shark-eaten body of the rich man's wife washes ashore.
9	"Shotgun"	David McNally	Jonathan Shapiro	December 1, 2006	3T5108	3.0/5
The firm represents the parking attendant for the TNT&G offices after police arrest him for the murder of his wife, since the only fingerprints on the gun are his.
10	"Filicide"	Kevin Bray	Lauren Schmidt, Alfredo Barrios Jr.	December 8, 2006	3T5109	3.3/6
Things get personal for the firm when Ron's former girlfriend (guest star Jane Seymour) stands trial for killing her teenage son, but she maintains it was in self-defense against her abusive son.
11	"Prior Convictions"	Deran Sarafian	Jonathan Shapiro, Courtney Kemp Agboh	December 15, 2006	3T5110	2.7/5
A man (Mykelti Williamson) whom Luther had successfully prosecuted for murder, 15 years earlier when he was the district attorney, becomes his client after the man is accused of murdering his landlord 2 months after being paroled.
12	"Christmas Party"	Paul McCrane	Craig O'Neill, Jason Tracey	December 22, 2006	3T5111	TBA
Luther assists Tom in defending a college student who has been accused of murdering a cab driver. Meantime, a baby has been abandoned in the TNT&G offices, and Ron and Alden must find its parents while the rest of the team are at the annual holiday party.
13	"False Confession"	John Peters	Alfredo Barrios Jr., Lauren Schmidt	February 28, 2007	3T5112	TBA
A teenaged babysitter (Mae Whitman) is blamed for the death of a child and forced to confess. Despite the unfair way the confession was obtained it was allowed in the trial.
