= The Judge (The Blacklist) =

- The Blacklist episode
- Episode no.: Season 1 Episode 15
- Directed by: Peter Werner
- Written by: Jonathan Shapiro; Lukas Reiter
- Production code: 115
- Original air date: March 3, 2014

Guest appearances
- Dianne Wiest as Ruth Kipling/The Judge; Hisham Tawfiq as Dembe Zuma; Amir Arison as Aram Mojtabai; Rachel Brosnahan as Jolene Parker; Reed Birney as Thomas Connolly; Trevor Long as Alan Ray Rifkin; Lance Reddick as The Cowboy; Thomas Kopache as Frank Gordon; Robert Clohessy as Richard Abraham; Brian Russell as William Munson

Episode chronology
← Previous "Madeline Pratt"	Next → "Mako Tanida"
- The Blacklist season 1

"The Judge" is the fifteenth episode of the first season of the American crime drama The Blacklist. The episode premiered in the United States on NBC on March 3, 2014.

== Plot ==
When a former Assistant U.S. Attorney is found bedraggled and walking the street after being missing for 12 years, Red suspects he was a victim of "The Judge", a mysterious person that runs an underground operation dispensing "eye for an eye" justice on officials who have wrongly convicted people. Red gets Elizabeth going on that case, then tackles his own agenda in finding out why a woman named Lucy Brooks has been following him. Lucy, as it turns out, is Jolene, the woman seducing Tom at a teacher conference in Orlando. As Elizabeth works the case of The Judge (revealed to be a woman named Ruth Kipling, played by Dianne Wiest), a man named Alan Ray Rifkin is about to be executed for treason, and it is discovered that Cooper is the Federal agent who put him away. Cooper becomes The Judge's next target and is nearly electrocuted, until Red arrives with proof that Rifkin really did commit the crimes for which he was executed. Cooper is released, The Judge is apprehended, and later sent to prison. When Cooper suggests Red brought him this case to gain leverage on him, Red replies that "a war is coming", and he may need Cooper's help. Back in Orlando, Tom declines "Jolene's" offer of an affair, proclaiming his love for Elizabeth. Jolene/Lucy then gets Tom to admit that Elizabeth isn't just his wife – she's also his target.

== Reception ==
=== Ratings ===
"The Judge" premiered on NBC on March 3, 2014 in the 10–11 p.m. time slot. The episode received a Nielsen rating/share of 2.7/8 among adults aged 18–49, with 11.01 million viewers., making it the highest rated show in its time slot and the ninth most watched television show of the week.

=== Reviews ===
Jason Evans of The Wall Street Journal gave a positive review of the episode: "WOW! It ended with a bang!! Tom is some kind of secret agent. Tom Bond is an appropriate name for him. Someone has assigned him to be in love with Liz. This is a major bombshell for the show!!".

JoJo Marshall of Entertainment Weekly also gave a positive review of the episode: "A war is coming on The Blacklist and it could not be more exciting. Shoo. Things are getting heated. People are starting to show their hands at this poker game".
