= The Cyprus Agency =

- The Blacklist episode
- Episode no.: Season 1 Episode 13
- Directed by: Michael Watkins
- Written by: Lukas Reiter
- Production code: 113
- Original air date: January 27, 2014

Guest appearances
- Campbell Scott as Owen Mallory / Michael Shaw; Hisham Tawfiq as Dembe Zuma; Amir Arison as Aram Mojtabai; Rachel Brosnahan as Jolene Parker; Wass Stevens as Perry; James Murtaugh as Charles Lassiter; Ezra Knight as Dr. Gideon Hadley; Matthew Rauch as Ted Caldwell; Susan Blommaert as Mr. Kaplan; Beth Dixon as Jill Lassiter; Joseph Adams as Medical Examiner; Kati Rediger as Kate Ellison; Jane Alexander as Diane Fowler

Episode chronology
| ← Previous "The Alchemist" | Next → "Madeline Pratt" |
- The Blacklist season 1

"The Cyprus Agency" is the thirteenth episode of the first season of the American crime drama The Blacklist. The episode premiered in the United States on NBC on January 27, 2014.

== Plot ==
After a recent spate of abductions of babies from their mothers, Red informs Elizabeth that the "Cyprus Agency" is the illegal adoption organization responsible. More or less coincidentally, Elizabeth and Tom contemplate adoption of their own which fuels Elizabeth to track down the organization's CEO, Owen Mallory (Campbell Scott). Ultimately, the task force discovers the Cyprus Agency's secret: it kidnaps young women and keeps them in captivity as breeders for the babies it puts up for adoption, and that Mallory is the father of all the children. Meanwhile, Meera willingly aids Red in his investigation for the mole. Covertly using Cooper's badge, Meera's intelligence leads Red to Diane Fowler as the ringleader of the leak, prompting him to confront Fowler in her own home, planning to kill her. She tells him that she knows about "that day", about what happened to his family, hoping Red will spare her for information. But Red still kills her, responding that he wants to know it more than anything in the world, but he'll find someone else who knows. He then calls Mr. Kaplan to clean up. In the end, Elizabeth finds herself unable to adopt a child as long as her marriage to Tom continues to suffer emotional strain. She is shown frustrated at home sitting in between baby stuff, while Tom goes to see Jolene, the woman who was flirting with him.

== Reception ==
=== Ratings ===
"The Cyprus Agency" premiered on NBC on January 27, 2014 in the 10–11 p.m. time slot. The episode garnered a 2.5/7 Nielsen rating with 10.17 million viewers, making it the highest rated show in its time slot and the thirteenth most watched television show of the week.

=== Reviews ===
Jason Evans of The Wall Street Journal gave a positive review of the episode: "Strong episode! The Cypress story was so creepy and sick that it held my attention more than the usual weekly blacklister does". He went on to call the show "a puzzle wrapped in an enigma shrouded in mystery".

Jim McMahon of IGN gave the episode a 5.8/10, criticising the story and its direction. He went on to say: "The FBI is still dumb as a bag of hammers, Lizzy's husband is still sucking up time on the show and Lizzy herself remains uninteresting despite Red's insistence otherwise".
