= The Alchemist (The Blacklist) =

- The Blacklist episode
- Episode no.: Season 1 Episode 12
- Directed by: Vince Misiano
- Written by: Anthony Sparks
- Production code: 112
- Original air date: January 20, 2014

Guest appearances
- Ryan O'Nan as The Alchemist; Hisham Tawfiq as Dembe Zuma; Amir Arison as Aram Mojtabai; Rachel Brosnahan as Jolene Parker; Elisabeth Waterston as Molly Trettel; David Vadim as Pytor Madrczyk; Dan McCabe as Borakove; Emily Tremaine as Audrey Bidwell

Episode chronology
← Previous "The Good Samaritan"	Next → "The Cyprus Agency"
- The Blacklist season 1

"The Alchemist" is the twelfth episode of the first season of the American crime drama The Blacklist. The episode premiered in the United States on NBC on January 20, 2014.

== Plot ==
Red informs the team that "The Alchemist" (guest star Ryan O'Nan), a man who relies upon science to transform a person's DNA and their appearance into someone else's, has been contracted to protect a well-known mob informant and his wife. As the team goes undercover to catch him, Elizabeth finds herself on the hunt for an unlikely couple. Meanwhile Elizabeth and Tom find themselves at another bump in their relationship and Ressler debates whether or not he should give his ex-fiancee his blessing. Meanwhile, Red continues conducting more investigations of his own and discovers the identity of the FBI double agent: Meera. Also, Lucy Brooks, the woman Red was looking for in ViCAP, is shown with files about Liz and Tom, and she infiltrates the Keen's baby shower party, introducing herself as "Jolene Parker", a substitute teacher. She flirts with Tom and, in the end, they visit an art exhibit together because Elizabeth is late from work. Red pays Meera a visit at her house with a loaded gun to interrogate her, and she admits to being the mole.

== Reception ==
=== Ratings ===
"The Alchemist" premiered on NBC on January 20, 2014 in the 10–11 p.m. time slot. The episode garnered a 2.3/6 Nielsen rating with 8.83 million viewers, making it the second most-watched show in its time slot behind ABC's Castle, which collected 8.96 million viewers. "The Alchemist" was also the eleventh most-watched television show of the week.

=== Reviews ===
Jason Evans of The Wall Street Journal gave a positive review of the episode: "This was a pretty solid episode. I doubt Red is going to kill Malik, she’s a character they can do a lot more with before offing her. The story of The Alchemist may seem relatively unimportant right now, but I bet it has an impact down the line because Red needs something from his client list".

Jim McMahon of IGN gave the episode a 7.2/10: "The Alchemist" goes back to meat-and-potatoes Blacklist territory, as the Feds chase another name and Red does what Red does". He further stated: "Still, the stuff that matters most is The Blacklist's strongest suit: James Spader elegantly chewing scenery and well-executed procedural plots with bad guys to match. As long as we keep getting healthy doses of each, I'm happy".
