= The Freelancer =

- The Blacklist episode
- Episode no.: Season 1 Episode 2
- Directed by: Jace Alexander
- Written by: Jon Bokenkamp
- Production code: 102
- Original air date: September 30, 2013

Guest appearances
- Daniel Sauli as Waiter; Hisham Tawfiq as Dembe Zuma; Deborah S. Craig as Luli Zeng; Isabella Rossellini as Floriana Campo; Jane Alexander as Diane Fowler

Episode chronology
← Previous "Pilot"	Next → "Wujing"
- The Blacklist season 1

"The Freelancer" is the second episode of the first season of the American crime drama The Blacklist. The episode premiered in the United States on NBC on September 30, 2013.

== Plot ==
Red alerts Elizabeth about a location and time where an unknown terrorist action will occur. Following a train derailment at the site, which Red believes to be the work of an assassin known as "The Freelancer", a brutally merciless assassin who frequently attacked entire buildings or significant modes of transportation like airplanes, trains, or ships, disguising his killings as accidents. Red said that through his accidents, he had killed 3,600 unintentional victims. Almost all of those fatalities were really unintended side effects of reaching a small number of crucial individuals. Red equated his level of slaughter to that of terrorist organizations and governments. Red also attributed the Freelancer for the collapse of building in Moscow, the shipwreck of a ferry in the Brahmaputra River, the assassination of an Ohio appeal court judge, and the assassination of a French diplomat in a plane crash. Then, Red and Elizabeth learn of the Freelancer's next target: Floriana Campo (Isabella Rossellini), a humanitarian working to end sex slavery by cartel gangs. The two attend one of Campo's charity events where Red identifies the Freelancer, whom Ressler apprehends. The Freelancer confesses that he is just a decoy Red hired to poison Campo. It is revealed that Red knew Campo was a fraud; she is actually running a sex slavery ring and uses the charity to eliminate competition. Meanwhile, as part of Red's immunity agreement, CIA Agent Meera Malik (Parminder Nagra) is assigned to his security detail. Tom is released from the hospital, and Elizabeth places his box back under the floorboards where she found it; she later views a recording of Tom speaking of his love for her during an adoption hearing.

== Reception ==
=== Ratings ===
"The Freelancer" premiered on NBC on September 30, 2013 in the 10–11 p.m. time slot. The episode garnered a 3.3/9 Nielsen rating with 11.35 million viewers, making it the highest rated show in its time slot. It was the thirteenth most watched television show of the week, and became NBC's most viewed drama through its first two weeks since Providence in January 1999.

=== Reviews ===
Phil Dyess-Nugent of The A.V. Club gave the episode a "C", noting that while "the show may not make a lick of sense", it "promises to always be absolutely on the nose". He felt that none of the supporting cast made much of an impression, but noted that "The Blacklist seems prepared to rise or fall on the strength of Spader's character".

Allison Keene The Hollywood Reporter gave a mixed review of the episode, stating that: "Watching The Blacklist is like drifting along a lazy river. There's a strong trajectory that moves in a linear fashion (the show is very brief on flashbacks), and the events — and their many twists — just wash over you. Even if you had guessed that Floriana Compo (Isabella Rossellini) may not have been entirely on the up and up, the way it unfolded was exceptionally fun to watch".
