= The Stewmaker =

- The Blacklist episode
- Episode no.: Season 1 Episode 4
- Directed by: Vince Misiano
- Written by: Patrick Massett; John Zinman
- Production code: 104
- Original air date: October 14, 2013

Guest appearances
- Clifton Collins, Jr. as Hector Lorca; Hisham Tawfiq as Dembe Zuma; Deborah S. Craig as Luli Zeng; Maryann Plunkett as Ellenore Kornish; Sharon Washington as Prosecutor; Tom Noonan as The Stewmaker

Episode chronology
← Previous "Wujing"	Next → "The Courier"
- The Blacklist season 1

"The Stewmaker" is the fourth episode of the first season of the American crime drama The Blacklist. The episode premiered in the United States on NBC on October 14, 2013.

== Plot ==
Elizabeth testifies against drug lord Hector Lorca (Clifton Collins, Jr.) when a vital witness is kidnapped. Red believes the witness was taken by "The Stewmaker" (Tom Noonan), a chemical expert who uses chemicals to dissolve his victims, who is also believed to have been responsible for countless disappearances. Elizabeth appeals to Lorca to help capture the Stewmaker, only to become the Stewmaker's captive. Red and Ressler are forced to work together; Ressler poses as an inside man when they meet with Lorca to obtain contact information for the Stewmaker (real name Stanley Kornish). Meanwhile, Elizabeth is being tortured by Stanley with injected chemicals. Red finds Kornish's hideout, saves Elizabeth, and kills him by pushing him into the chemical bath Kornish had prepared for Elizabeth. Red also steals a photograph from the picture album containing all Kornish's victims. Elizabeth tries to find out something about the homicide perpetrated with her husband's hidden weapon and finds out when and where it occurred – in Boston, while she was there with Tom, who said he had a job interview at the hotel where the murder occurred.

== Reception ==
=== Ratings ===
"The Stewmaker" premiered on NBC on October 14, 2013 in the 10–11 p.m. time slot. The episode garnered a 3.0/8 Nielsen rating with 10.93 million viewers, making it the highest rated show in its time slot and the thirteenth most watched television show of the week.

=== Reviews ===
Jason Evans of The Wall Street Journal called the episode "the best of the season so far". He went on to praise Spader's performance as Raymond Reddington, noting that Spader "[delivered] all his lines with such confidence and fun".

Phil Dyess-Nugent of The A.V. Club gave the episode a "C", noting that the show "continues to have major conceptual problems". He compared Diego Klattenhoff's role as Donald Ressler to that of Cliff Barnes, noting that Klattenhoff "continues to inspire a mixture of irritation and pity as Agent Ressler".
