= The Pavlovich Brothers =

- The Blacklist episode
- Episode no.: Season 1 Episode 19
- Directed by: Paul Edwards
- Written by: Elizabeth Benjamin
- Production code: 119
- Original air date: April 21, 2014

Episode chronology
← Previous "Milton Bobbit"	Next → "The Kingmaker"
- The Blacklist season 1

"The Pavlovich Brothers" is the nineteenth episode of the first season of the American crime drama The Blacklist. The episode premiered in the United States on NBC on April 21, 2014.

== Plot ==
Xiao Ping Li, a scientist involved in a biologic weapons project known as White Fog, is drugged at an immunization center in China and whisked to Washington, D.C. by CIA agents for interrogation. The Pavlovich brothers specialize in abductions of high-value targets, including General Ryker's daughter (from "Pilot"). According to Red, they are in town planning their next hit, Li. Meanwhile, Tom discovers that Elizabeth knows his secret, informs his people and flees. While the team tries to locate the Pavlovich brothers' target, Red makes a deal with the Brothers to abduct and deliver Tom to Elizabeth. Elizabeth tries to torture Tom into revealing his bosses, but he quickly turns the tables and corners her. After explaining his job never included hurting her, he claims to be "one of the good guys" and tells Elizabeth that Red isn't at all who he seems to be. Before fleeing, Tom tells Elizabeth about a safe deposit box, the key to which she already found in the lamp. With Tom in their view, Red instructs Dembe not to capture him again, but rather follow his tail. The next day, Elizabeth opens the deposit box and is shocked when she looks at the photo inside.

== Reception ==
=== Ratings ===
"The Pavlovich Brothers" premiered on NBC on April 21, 2014 in the 10–11 p.m. time slot. The episode garnered a 2.8/8 Nielsen rating with 11.24 million viewers, making it the highest rated show in its time slot and the fifth most watched television show of the week.

=== Reviews ===
Jason Evans of The Wall Street Journal gave a positive review of the episode: "Wow, this was a great one. I would have preferred that the Pavlovich Brothers not go down so quickly, but their story was pretty cool because it connected to Tom and Liz. All the scenes with the unhappy couple were fabulous!".

Ross Bonaime of Paste gave the episode a 5.5/10. In his review: "Ever since The Blacklist’s premiere, the show has been throwing its audience little pieces of clues that should fit into the larger puzzle, yet don't add up. As we near the end of the first season, The Blacklist is desperately trying to make these different elements coalesce into something that will give the illusion this has been the big picture all along, but it's really just the show scrambling to make anything at all make sense".
