= The Good Samaritan (The Blacklist) =

- The Blacklist episode
- Episode no.: Season 1 Episode 11
- Directed by: Dan Lerner
- Written by: Brandon Margolis; Brandon Sonnier
- Production code: 111
- Original air date: January 13, 2014

Guest appearances
- Alan Alda as Alan Fitch; Frank Whaley as Karl Hoffman; Hisham Tawfiq as Dembe Zuma; Amir Arison as Aram Mojtabai; Charles Baker as Grey / Newton Phillips; Shirley Roeca as Melissa Wilkinson; Victor Slezak as Henry Krueger; Kate Nowlin as Karen Brodine; Deborah S. Craig as Luli Zeng; Dominik Tiefenthaler as Fyodor; Frank Pando as George Wilkinson; Neal Matarazzo as Mr. Brodine; Eisa Davis as ND Agent; Graham Winton as Support Group Leader; Jane Alexander as Diane Fowler

Episode chronology
| ← Previous "Anslo Garrick Conclusion" | Next → "The Alchemist" |
- The Blacklist season 1

"The Good Samaritan" is the eleventh episode of the first season of the American crime drama The Blacklist. The episode premiered in the United States on NBC on January 13, 2014.

== Plot ==
Red remains missing and conducts his own investigation to hunt down those who betrayed him during the Anslo Garrick incident. The entire FBI team is under investigation as internal affairs tries to find the mole. Aram is initially suspected, but Red is able to prove he was set up. Meanwhile, a serial killer from Liz's past, "The Good Samaritan" (guest star Frank Whaley), strikes again. Elizabeth is allowed to join the hunt for the killer, as Cooper knows Red will likely realize how much this unsolved case means to Elizabeth and reach out to help her. Soon Elizabeth discovers the victims are all linked through abusing a family member, and that the killer was likely an abuse victim himself. Though she finally kills the Good Samaritan, she gives the man's final near-victim (guest star Frank Pando) a warning to treat his wife better or she'll make him regret hurting her. Red confronts a financier named Henry Krueger (Victor Slezak) for betraying him and shoots him, forcing the wounded Kreuger to give up the name Newton Phillips, who is in fact Red's aide. Red later confronts Phillips for leaking his location to Garrick and kills him via suffocation, with Phillips having told him to make it look like an accident. Red then visits Elizabeth to tell her that "his house is clean" now, but hers isn't, explaining that Phillips couldn't have pulled this off by himself and that there's another mole inside the unit.

== Reception ==
=== Ratings ===
"The Good Samaritan" premiered on NBC on January 13, 2014, in the 10–11 p.m. time slot. The episode garnered a 2.5/7 Nielsen rating with 9.35 million viewers, making it the highest rated show in its time slot and the eleventh most watched television show of the week.

=== Reviews ===
Jason Evans of The Wall Street Journal praised James Spader's performance as Raymond Reddington: "This was another tour-de-force by James Spader. He has so much fun playing bad Red and we saw a lot of bad Red tonight". However, he said "the story of the Samaritan was a bit of a yawner" and thought "it just did not matter to the overall plot".

Jodi Walker of Entertainment Weekly gave a mixed review of the episode: "The Blacklist may be a little over the top, and it may really just be a showcase for one great actor, but I continue to be impressed by its ability to balance a serialized mystery and mythology with week-to-week storytelling and narrative arcs".
