= The Kingmaker (The Blacklist) =

- The Blacklist episode
- Episode no.: Season 1 Episode 20
- Directed by: Karen Gaviola
- Written by: J. R. Orci; Lukas Reiter
- Production code: 120
- Original air date: April 28, 2014

Episode chronology
← Previous "The Pavlovich Brothers"	Next → "Berlin"
- The Blacklist season 1

"The Kingmaker" is the twentieth episode of the first season of the American crime drama The Blacklist. The episode premiered in the United States on NBC on April 28, 2014.

== Plot ==
After a politician in Prague is framed for a murder, Red suspects it's the work of The Kingmaker (guest star Linus Roache) – a strategist behind the rise of some of the world's most powerful politicians. Red is seen meeting with an ally about the Prague matter, and the man tells him that the recent news of a siege on Red's interests is causing several key people to start distancing themselves. Elizabeth views the photos that Tom had led her to, which show Red at the hospital where her adoptive father Sam had died. She confronts Red about it, but he steers her toward the more urgent matter of The Kingmaker being in the U.S. Elizabeth and the team are able to uncover a plot by The Kingmaker to run the car of a freshman New York state assemblyman off a bridge, attempting to make him look like a hero by saving his family. This puts him in the best position to win a special election for a Senate seat, which The Kingmaker vacates by killing the Senator. Alarms go off in the home where the murder is committed, with Ressler and Liz entering the home. The Kingmaker attacks Elizabeth and applies a choke hold, before being fatally shot by Ressler. Red meets with Fitch, telling him his businesses are under attack and suggesting it's a mutual problem, and proposes that they cooperate against their common enemy. Fitch meets with members of his global alliance, then tells Red they have chosen not to ally themselves with him, despite Red's threats to expose them. Elizabeth phones Red to inform him about The Kingmaker. Red says he wants 10 minutes with the man to find out who ordered the Prague incident, but Liz has to tell him that The Kingmaker is dead. Elizabeth then visits Red about her adoptive father, with Red finally admitting he killed Sam. Elizabeth calls Red a "monster", and says the two of them are done.

== Reception ==
=== Ratings ===
"The Kingmaker" premiered on NBC on April 28, 2014, in the 10–11 p.m. time slot. The episode garnered a 2.7/8 Nielsen rating with 10.85 million viewers, making it the highest rated show in its time slot and the fifth most watched television show of the week.

=== Reviews ===
Jason Evans of The Wall Street Journal gave a positive review of the episode: "Wowowowowowowowow! This was a huge one! Again, the show did a great job of tying the Blacklister of the week in to the larger story about Red and everything that is going on in his life".

JoJo Marshall of Entertainment Weekly also gave a positive review of the episode: "The Kingmaker stages politically-minded deaths, causing trouble for Reddington, while Liz discovers the truth about her father's end". After the episode ended, she went on to say: "NO. NO. I want to see what happens!! They’d better show us next week, when we'll also find out who Berlin is and how the Blacklist is 'all connected'".
