= General Ludd (The Blacklist) =

- The Blacklist episode
- Episode no.: Season 1 Episode 8
- Directed by: Stephen Surjik
- Written by: Amanda Kate Shuman
- Production code: 108
- Original air date: November 11, 2013

Guest appearances
- Justin Kirk as Nathaniel Wolff; Hisham Tawfiq as Dembe Zuma; Deborah S. Craig as Luli Zeng; Amir Arison as Aram Mojtabai; William Sadler as Sam Milhoan; Graeme Malcolm as The Man with the Apple; Kelly Deadmon as Mary; Richard Bekins as Gold Club Member; Andrew Dice Clay as Abraham Maltz

Episode chronology
← Previous "Frederick Barnes"	Next → "Anslo Garrick"
- The Blacklist season 1

"General Ludd" is the eighth episode of the first season of the American crime drama The Blacklist. The episode premiered in the United States on NBC on November 11, 2013.

== Plot ==
Elizabeth uncovers an elaborate plot to destroy the country's financial system when a new name on the blacklist, General Ludd (Justin Kirk), is revealed by Reddington. Reddington demands access to the FBI database ViCAP in return for his help. Meanwhile, Tom informs Lizzy that her adoptive father, Sam, is dying from cancer in the hospital. All airplanes are grounded because of General Ludd's plan for terrorism, so Lizzy is unable to fly home to be with her father, Sam (guest star William Sadler). Meanwhile, Reddington visits Sam in the hospital, and the two reminisce as old friends. Sam expresses that he has 6 weeks to live. He wishes he only had 6 hours to live, as he does not wish to die a slow death. Reddington tells Sam that he did a fantastic job raising Lizzy as his own, and that he will protect her just as he did. Sam tells Reddington that he wants Lizzy to know "the truth" before he dies. Reddington objects, stating that she must never know. He then kills Sam to end his suffering, and also to keep "the truth" hidden. General Ludd steals a hard drive containing the blueprints for newly minted U.S. currency. However, Reddington finds Ludd and steals the hard drive before the FBI arrive. Lizzy finds out that her father has died. Red uses his new access to ViCAP to look up the number the Chinese gave him in "Wujing"; it's the number of a file on a woman named Lucy Brooks. Red comforts Elizabeth as she mourns her father.

== Reception ==
=== Ratings ===
"General Ludd" premiered on NBC on November 11, 2013 in the 10–11 p.m. time slot. The episode garnered a 3.0/8 Nielsen rating with 10.69 million viewers, making it the highest rated show in its time slot and the eleventh most watched television show of the week.

=== Reviews ===
Jason Evans of The Wall Street Journal thought that "the side stories about the bad guys being caught each week are getting dull". In his comment: "We want to learn more about Tom and Liz and Red. But the show is giving that info out in very small doses". He noted the show's "hints that Red is Liz’s father", but felt that idea was "too obvious".

Phil Dyess-Nugent of The A.V. Club gave the episode a "C+". He felt that the show was "so close to saying out loud that Red is Elizabeth’s father that any other explanation for his interest in her is likely to ring hollow". He was confused about General Ludd's character, noting "that he gives Red a convenient whipping boy to whom he can deliver his own heartfelt defense of capitalism".
