= The Courier (The Blacklist) =

- The Blacklist episode
- Episode no.: Season 1 Episode 5
- Directed by: Nick Gomez
- Written by: John C. Kelley
- Production code: 105
- Original air date: October 21, 2013

Guest appearances
- Barbara Schulz as Laurence Dechambou; Charles Baker as Grey; Hisham Tawfiq as Dembe Zuma; Deborah S. Craig as Luli Zeng; Graeme Malcolm as The Man with the Apple; Brian Tarantina as The Courier's Brother; Robert Knepper as The Courier

Episode chronology
← Previous "The Stewmaker"	Next → "Gina Zanetakos"
- The Blacklist season 1

"The Courier" is the fifth episode of the first season of the American crime drama The Blacklist. The episode premiered in the United States on NBC on October 21, 2013.

== Plot ==
A courier (Robert Knepper) is scheduled to deliver a valuable shipment to an Iranian spy. Following a car chase, Elizabeth and Malik manage to arrest the courier, and they learn he has imprisoned Seth Nelson, an NSA analyst. Nelson is entombed and only has a limited amount of air left. While the FBI searches for him, the courier escapes. Red coerces the courier's contact, club owner Laurence Dechambou (Barbara Schulz), to help find him, and with that information Malik and Ressler eventually track the Courier and then kill him in self-defense. Elizabeth and Red meanwhile, find and save Seth. As an act of gratitude, Seth gives Red documents regarding the high-profile murder Elizabeth suspected Tom was involved in, and Red sends them to her. At the same time at home, Tom discovers the box and wants to talk to Elizabeth about it. They are unaware that their house is bugged with cameras and listening devices, and they're being watched.

== Reception ==
=== Ratings ===
"The Courier" premiered on NBC on October 21, 2013 in the 10–11 p.m. time slot. The episode garnered a 3.0/8 Nielsen rating with 10.44 million viewers, making it the second most-watched show in its time slot behind ABC's Castle, which collected 10.59 million viewers. "The Courier" was also the thirteenth most-watched television show of the week.

=== Reviews ===
Jason Evans of The Wall Street Journal felt the episode "left [people] on a cliffhanger". He went on to say that "the weekly criminals being caught are almost an afterthought compared to the drama of [the] story" and that "the slow reveal of Liz, Red, and Tom's backstories" make the show great.

Ross Bonaime of Paste gave "The Courier" a 6.0/10, stating that: "The Blacklist is slowly finding a way to make its show work in a less-frustrating and more watchable way since the pilot, but it still has a long way to go before it’s even a good show".
