= Ivan (The Blacklist) =

- The Blacklist episode
- Episode no.: Season 1 Episode 17
- Directed by: Randy Zisk
- Written by: J.R. Orci; Amanda Kate Shuman
- Production code: 117
- Original air date: March 24, 2014

Guest appearance
- Mark Ivanir as Ivan

Episode chronology
← Previous "Mako Tanida"	Next → "Milton Bobbit"
- The Blacklist season 1

"Ivan" is the seventeenth episode of the first season of the American crime drama The Blacklist. The episode premiered in the United States on NBC on March 24, 2014.

== Plot ==
A programmer for the NSA is killed in a supposed car accident, but further inspection reveals that his car was hacked. While investigating the programmer's death, the task force learns that the NSA was working on a prototype device called the "Skeleton Key", capable of hacking into the entire American computer networks infrastructure. Reddington initially believes an elusive Russian hacker named Ivan (Mark Ivanir) is responsible for the theft, but a personal meeting with him reveals that Ivan never had any problems with the United States, and instead is solely focused on the Russian government. Ivan claims that someone else has been masquerading as him. Further investigation into Ivan's claims leads the task force to high school student Harrison Lee, who was responsible for the theft of the Skeleton Key. Lee stole the key and used it for his own ends in order to enter a romantic relationship with the daughter of one of the Skeleton Key scientists. Elizabeth manages to convince Lee – who was poised to kill her and himself by derailing the hijacked train – to surrender himself to the FBI after she assures him that the programmer's death is an accident.

Elizabeth investigates the disappearance of Jolene/Lucy after being approached by Lucy's former parole officer. Elizabeth discovers Tom's makeshift headquarters after Aram is able to trace the origin of Lucy's last voice message, but Tom has just torn down and burned all photos of Red and Elizabeth. He pounces at Liz and flees before she could recognize him. During the aftermath of the Skeleton Key crisis, Elizabeth receives an email containing gathered evidence from the parole officer. In a photo of some trash taken in Tom's hideout, she sees an educational toy that she had given Tom the morning of the investigation. Finally understanding Red's repeated warnings about Tom and upset by the recent revelation, Elizabeth turns to Red for emotional support. Red refurbishes an old music box whose song Elizabeth knows from her childhood, and gives it to her as a gift.

== Reception ==
=== Ratings ===
"Ivan" premiered on NBC on March 24, 2014 in the 10–11 p.m. time slot. The episode garnered a 2.8/8 Nielsen rating with 10.80 million viewers, making it the highest rated show in its time slot and the eighth most watched television show of the week.

=== Reviews ===
Jason Evans of The Wall Street Journal gave a positive review of the episode: "WHOA!! Why isn't Liz more freaked out that Red knows so much about her childhood? The folks who remain convinced that Red is Liz's father got some real ammo from this episode, that's for sure. I am still not convinced".

Ross Bonaime of Paste gave the episode a 7.0/10. He said the show "still feels like two separate, unassociated shows mashed into one" and even though the show "has found its groove", it "doesn't seem to have any interest in combining the stories in a more cohesive way".
