= T Cooper =

American novelist

- Born: Malibu, California, U.S.
- Education: Middlebury College; Columbia University (MFA)
- Occupations: Writer; editor; director; producer; assistant professor
- Known for: Some of the Parts (2002); Lipshitz Six, or Two Angry Blondes (2006); A Fictional History of the United States With Huge Chunks Missing (2006); The Beaufort Diaries (2010); Real Man Adventures (2013); Changers (2014-2016)

T Cooper (born Malibu, California) is an American writer.

Cooper is the author of eight novels, the editor of an anthology, and the co-writer of a four-part young adult novel series. He has also written for television, and is the director/producer of a feature documentary film.

== Biography ==
Cooper earned an undergraduate degree from Middlebury College and an MFA in fiction writing from Columbia University. He has twice been a fellow of the MacDowell Colony. He attended Ledig House International and The Millay Colony, where he was a 2008 New York Times Foundation fellow.

Cooper has authored eight novels, including Some of the Parts (Akashic Books, 2002), Lipshitz Six, or Two Angry Blondes (Dutton/Penguin, 2006), and the graphic novel The Beaufort Diaries (Melville House, 2010). Lipshitz Six received significant positive critical attention, including a positive review in The New York Times Book Review and placements on both Time Out New York's list of "25 New Yorkers to Keep an Eye On in 2006" and Out's "100 Men and Women Who Rocked 2006" list. The novel was also chosen as a Best Book of 2006 by The Believer and The Austin Chronicle. Cooper also edited the anthology A Fictional History of the United States With Huge Chunks Missing (Akashic Books, 2006). His most recent books are the four-part young adult novel series Changers (Akashic Books), co-written with his wife Allison Glock-Cooper. (Changers Book One: Drew was published in 2014; Changers Book Two: Oryon was published in 2015, and Changers Book Three: Kim was published in 2016.)

Cooper's shorter writing has appeared in a variety of publications, including The New Yorker, One Story, The New York Times, The New York Times Style Magazine, Esquire, The Guardian, The Believer, Poets & Writers, Electric Literature, O: The Oprah Magazine, The Brooklyn Review, Bomb, Portland Review, Document Journal, Columbia Journal, and several others.

Cooper has also written for television, such as the Netflix musical drama The Get Down, the BBC America period crime drama Copper, and the long-running NBC crime thriller The Blacklist. In 2018, he directed and produced the documentary Man Made, which followed four trans men as they trained for a bodybuilding competition.

== Personal life ==
Cooper is a trans man. He wrote about his experience in the nonfiction book Real Man Adventures (McSweeney's, 2013). He lives with his wife author Allison Glock and their two daughters, splitting time between New York City and Atlanta, where he is currently an Assistant Professor of English and Creative Writing at Emory University.

== Bibliography ==
- Some of the Parts (Akashic Books, 2002)
- Lipshitz Six, or Two Angry Blondes (Dutton/Penguin, 2006)
- A Fictional History of the United States With Huge Chunks Missing (Akashic Books, 2006) (editor)
- The Beaufort Diaries (Melville House, 2010)
- Real Man Adventures (McSweeney's, 2013)
- Changers Book One: Drew (Akashic Books, 2014) (co-writer)
- Changers Book Two: Oryon (Akashic Books, 2015) (co-writer)
- Changers Book Three: Kim (Akashic Books, 2016) (co-writer)
- Changers Book Four: Forever (Akashic Books, 2018) (co-writer)

== Filmography ==
Year	Title	Notes	Broadcaster/Distributor
2013	Copper	Episode: "The Hope Too Bright to Last" (co-written with Alison Glock)	BBC America
2016	The Get Down	Episode: "Darkness Is Your Candle" (writer)	Netflix
2018	Man Made	Feature documentary (director, producer)	Frameline
2019-2022	The Blacklist	5 episodes (writer), 72 episodes (consulting/executive producer)	NBC
