= Milton Bobbit =

- The Blacklist episode
- Episode no.: Season 1 Episode 18
- Directed by: Steven A. Adelson
- Written by: Daniel Voll
- Production code: 118
- Original air date: March 31, 2014

Episode chronology
← Previous "Ivan"	Next → "The Pavlovich Brothers"
- The Blacklist season 1

"Milton Bobbit" is the eighteenth episode of the first season of the American crime drama The Blacklist. The episode premiered in the United States on NBC on March 31, 2014.

== Plot ==
A series of seemingly unconnected murder-suicides are attributed by Red to a life insurance claims adjuster named Milton Bobbit (Damian Young), who is able to convince terminally ill people to carry out the acts in exchange for financial rewards for their surviving family members. The targets of the murders are ultimately discovered to all be part of a clinical drug trial for type 2 diabetes that caused people to die, and Bobbit himself is found to be terminal. Elizabeth, Ressler and the team must catch up with Bobbit before he himself takes out the next victim: the doctor who headed up the trial. They manage to arrest the doctor and let Bobbit commit suicide. In Cooper's office, Red has a look at Bobbit's client list which seems to matter much to him.

After Red gets some DNA results on Tom, he determines that Craig (real name "Christopher") is not Tom's brother. Elizabeth traps Chris in his hotel room and tries to get answers. Tom calls Chris while Elizabeth, Red and Dembe are in the room, and mentions "Berlin". Red demands to know what's in Berlin, but a frightened-looking Chris says he cannot say anything. After Red threatens that he'll find a way to make him talk, Chris hurls himself through the hotel room's window, falling to his death, after which Tom attempts to convince Liz that Craig had to fly home.

== Reception ==
=== Ratings ===
"Milton Bobbit" premiered on NBC on March 31, 2014 in the 10–11 p.m. time slot. The episode garnered a 2.8/8 Nielsen rating with 11.39 million viewers, making it the highest rated show in its time slot and the eighth most watched television show of the week.

=== Reviews ===
Gwen Orel of The Wall Street Journal gave a positive review of the episode. She compared the episode to Patricia Highsmith's 1956 psychological thriller novel Strangers on a Train and noted that several of the show's "big bad secrets are out".

Ross Bonaime of Paste gave the episode a 5.0/10, calling the show "dumb". He further stated: "Many times, it combines intentionally frustrating choices, stupid decision making and illogical plot developments in a way that is literally laughable. At one point in the latest episode, Elizabeth yells at Reddington to just stop playing these ridiculous games, and it felt like she was reading directly from my notes".
