= Berlin (The Blacklist) =

- The Blacklist episode
- Episode no.: Season 1 Episode 21
- Directed by: Michael Zinberg
- Written by: John Eisendrath; Jon Bokenkamp
- Production code: 121
- Original air date: May 5, 2014

Episode chronology
← Previous "The Kingmaker"	Next → "Berlin Conclusion"
- The Blacklist season 1

"Berlin" is the twenty-first episode of the first season of the American crime drama The Blacklist. The episode premiered in the United States on NBC on May 5, 2014.

== Plot ==
Elizabeth tells Ressler, and then the FBI, her story about Tom. In the midst of a virus outbreak inside a bank, Elizabeth refuses to work with Red and sends Cooper her resignation, informing him that Red killed her father. Red tries to explain to her that the outbreak is connected to Tom, and ask if her anger towards him (Red) is above putting lives at risk. Elizabeth agrees to work the case, but declares it her last. Red is certain that the Cullen virus is part of a plan to kill him, as well as being capable of creating a widespread epidemic. Red and Elizabeth meet with Dr. Sanders (John Glover), an expert on the virus, who is also a mental patient. The conversation gets loony when Dr. Sanders speaks of Space Agent UD-4126 and omens of the Cullen virus leading to the apocalypse. Elizabeth storms out, accusing Red of using the visit as a diversion to change her mind about quitting. Meanwhile, Cooper is given an ultimatum by his superiors: if Elizabeth walks, Red no longer has immunity and the task force is no more. Elizabeth learns that Dr. Sanders had created an antidote for the virus and the team suspects that he was working with another doctor from outside the mental institution. Elizabeth pays Dr. Sanders another visit and noticing the nurse's ID badge number, it turns out that UD-4126 leads to one Dr. Nikolaus Vogel (Brennan Brown). Once he's arrested, he refuses to talk to Elizabeth, except with the warning of Berlin's coming. Elizabeth had laced his drinking water with the virus, and uses the antidote to blackmail him into talking. Using Tom's code book—which Red had given to her earlier as an "olive branch" - Elizabeth discovers connections among several members of Red's Blacklist, deciphering that he knew someone was targeting his interests, but not specifically who it is. He's been using his relationship with the FBI task force to systematically eliminate his enemies and draw Berlin out of hiding. Dr. Vogel gives up the names of 5 people involved in a prison plane transport, all airport employees infected with Cullen. Elizabeth begins to have a change of heart about leaving, but Cooper tells her it's too late. She finds Red and warns him about the FBI's pursuit and his immunity. She begs him to run, but he refuses, wanting to know about her sudden change of heart. Elizabeth goes on to tell Red how much she wants to kill him for ruining her life, but that she also needs answers from him. He tells her that he needs things from her also, and that nothing is worse than losing her. It becomes apparent to both that they are stuck with each other. As Red surrenders himself, the prison transport plane flies overhead and crashes. The war has begun.

== Reception ==
=== Ratings ===
"Berlin" premiered on NBC on May 5, 2014 in the 10–11 p.m. time slot. The episode garnered a 2.7/8 Nielsen rating with 10.47 million viewers, making it the highest rated show in its time slot and the fourth most watched television show of the week.

=== Reviews ===
Jason Evans of The Wall Street Journal gave a positive review of the episode: "Wow… just wow! I love the way the show has now connected many of the random Blacklisters to a larger story. Red and Liz each had some great scenes this episode! Liz turning the tables on Vogel was one of her best moments all season. I can't wait to see what happens next week!"

Cory Barker of TV.com gave a mixed review of the episode: "Like many of the 2014 episodes of The Blacklist, "Berlin" was far from bad, but lacked some of the spark that drove the episodes from last fall. This one delivered a couple of key reveals and certainly set stories and characters up for what could be a crazy, deadly finale. Yet, this second half of the season has been so content to just push the goalposts to the next week that there's no guarantee that the crazy and deadly will ever come".
