= Mako Tanida =

- The Blacklist episode
- Episode no.: Season 1 Episode 16
- Directed by: Michael Watkins
- Story by: Joe Carnahan
- Teleplay by: John Eisendrath; Jon Bokenkamp; Patrick Massett; John Zinman
- Production code: 116
- Original air date: March 17, 2014

Guest appearance
- Hoon Lee as Mako Tanida

Episode chronology
← Previous "The Judge"	Next → "Ivan"
- The Blacklist season 1

"Mako Tanida" is the sixteenth episode of the first season of the American crime drama The Blacklist. The episode premiered in the United States on NBC on March 17, 2014.

== Plot ==
Osaka-based Yakuza crime boss and gangster Mako Tanida (Hoon Lee), escapes from Abashiri Prison and kills FBI Special Agent Sam Raimo by forcing him to commit the ritual suicide seppuku, claiming revenge for "collateral damage" caused by the FBI when they were after Red. After another FBI agent, Special Agent Pete McGuire, turns up dead in America, Ressler fears he may be next, as he was part of the team searching for Red back then. He grabs Audrey and attempts to take her somewhere safe, but his car is rammed by Tanida's driver. In the ensuing melee, Tanida shoots and kills Audrey. Ressler vows to take out Tanida, despite warnings from Cooper and Red to let other agents take it from here. Meanwhile, Lucy/Jolene announces plans to move in next to Tom and Elizabeth, but Tom later meets Lucy in a hideout and the two converse about mutual, though possibly conflicting, plans to get to Red in order to provide an unknown entity named "Berlin" with answers. Tom assures Lucy he has done everything he could to maintain the ruse of his devotion to Elizabeth, but complications arose when he was knifed by the men sent by Red, causing Elizabeth to find his fake passports and cash. Hired by Red to abduct Lucy/Jolene, the Cowboy tails her but is knocked out by Tom who later kills both of them.

Collaborating with an old FBI buddy and ex-FBI Special Agent Bobby Jonica, who was also on that task force, Ressler locates Tanida, but later learns that Bobby is the mysterious "Tensei" – the man who took over Tanida's criminal empire while the latter was in prison; by the time Mako was arrested by the FBI, Bobby murdered Mako's brother, Aiko, and covered his death to use his identity. Ressler attempts coercing Bobby into committing suicide via seppuku before being stopped by Elizabeth, though Bobby ultimately does kill himself. Later at home, Ressler receives a gift from Reddington: a box containing Tanida's severed head. Later, Red enjoys a private ballet show of Swan Lake being a wealthy donor.

== Reception ==
=== Ratings ===
"Mako Tanida" premiered on NBC on March 17, 2014 in the 10–11 p.m. time slot. The episode garnered a 2.7/8 Nielsen rating with 10.97 million viewers, making it the highest rated show in its time slot and the fifth most watched television show of the week.

=== Reviews ===
Jason Evans of The Wall Street Journal gave a mixed review of the episode. He called the villain of the episode "pretty much meaningless": "We don't care one bit about whoever Mako Tanida may be because the last episode delivered perhaps the biggest bombshell of the thrilling first season of the show. We finally found out that Tom is some kind of secret agent". He went on to call the episode a "doozy" and guessed that "the show could be paving the way for Ressler and Liz to get together".

Jo Jo Marshall of Entertainment Weekly gave a positive review of the episode: "Tom Keen gets crazy and Agent Ressler gets rampage-y on the hunt for Yakuza druglord Mako Tanida". She went on to mention the "killing spree" of the episode, noting: "Everyone is on one in this episode. What a body count!"
