= Pilot (The Blacklist) =

- The Blacklist episode
- Episode no.: Season 1 Episode 1
- Directed by: Joe Carnahan
- Written by: Jon Bokenkamp
- Production code: 101
- Original air date: September 23, 2013

Guest appearances
- Chance Kelly as Daniel Ryker; Jamie Jackson as Ranko Zamani; Delphina Belle as Beth

Episode chronology
← Previous —	Next → "The Freelancer"
- The Blacklist season 1

"Pilot" is the pilot episode of the first season of the American crime drama The Blacklist. The episode premiered in the United States on NBC on September 23, 2013. It was written by series creator Jon Bokenkamp and was directed by Joe Carnahan.

NBC bought the rights to The Blacklist from Sony Pictures Television in August 2012 and green-lit production in January 2013. Producers said that the casting process was difficult. They initially offered the male lead to Kiefer Sutherland before James Spader accepted the role three days before filming began. Even though the series is set in Washington, D.C., the pilot was mainly filmed in the same Manhattan studio where Law & Order was filmed.

In this episode, of which The Blacklist number of this episode is No. 52, ex-US Navy Office of Naval Intelligence officer turned professional criminal and FBI Most Wanted fugitive Raymond Reddington (James Spader) turns himself in to the FBI and offers to give up information about the criminals he has worked with in exchange for sole communication with FBI profiler Elizabeth Keen (Megan Boone). After Reddington convinces Keen to work with him, they work to capture Serbian terrorist Ranko Zamani (Jamie Jackson), a terrorist thought to be dead by the FBI.

"Pilot" debuted the series for the 2013–14 season. The episode received generally positive reviews, with several critics praising James Spader's portrayal of Raymond Reddington. In its original airing, "Pilot" received a 3.8/10 Nielsen rating with 12.58 million viewers, making it the highest-rated television show in its time slot and the eleventh most-watched television show of the week.

== Plot ==
One of the FBI's most wanted men, Raymond Reddington (James Spader), strolls into the bureau headquarters in D.C. and turns himself in. He has information on a crime about to be perpetrated by a Serbian terrorist believed by the bureau to be dead. When the Serbian is recognized at the airport by facial identification software as Ranko Zamani (Jamie Jackson), the division head answers to Reddington's demands in order to get his help catching Zamani. Reddington insists on working exclusively with Elizabeth Keen (Megan Boone), a profiler who had just been hired. Reddington knows quite a bit about Keen, which convinces her and the SAC to acquiesce to Reddington's plan. Zamani plans to kidnap and booby trap the daughter of a general responsible for destroying a chemical weapons factory that poisoned Zamani's family.

Keen gets to the girl first but loses her in a daring raid by Zamani's forces. Now aware of Keen, Zamani attacks her husband, Tom, in their home, gravely wounding him. Keen notes a stamp on the man's hand and deduces the attack will take place at a zoo. Reddington briefly escapes custody to meet with Zamani, revealing that unbeknownst to the FBI, he masterminded the ploy, as well as the attack on Tom. Reddington removes the tracking device and places it with Zamani, which helps the FBI track down and kill the latter. Keen finds the daughter and a bomb in her backpack. Reddington calls in a clandestine bomb tech to disable the bomb, who then escapes with it. Reddington tells Elizabeth that her husband, with whom she is trying to adopt a baby, is not what he appears to be.

Returning to the FBI, Reddington offers to provide information on a number of the world's dangerous criminals, his "blacklist", in order to commute his sentence and work with Keen. At home, Keen discovers a hidden box of cash, passports, and a gun, all belonging to her husband. She confronts Reddington to find out what he knows and stares at him as the episode ends.

== Production ==
=== Background ===
NBC bought the rights to The Blacklist from Sony Pictures Television in August 2012 and greenlighted the show in January 2013. During an NBC upfront presentation in May 2013, The Blacklist was NBC's highest-testing drama in 10 years.

After showing a screening of "Pilot" at Comic-Con, producers revealed that their inspiration for The Blacklist came from the capture of Whitey Bulger. Recalling the experience in an interview with Collider, executive producer John Eisendrath stated:

So, the idea was, "Well, what would happen if a man like Whitey Bulger turned himself in and said, 'I am here. I have some rules that I want you to follow, but if you follow them I will give you the names of people that I have worked with, during the 20 years that I have been a fugitive"'. So, there was a real world influence that affected the shaping of the show that was already being thought about. How can you put someone that you don't trust in the center of a show about trying to find criminals? And here was an example in the real world of just such a person. It was a fortuitous turn of events, where the idea for a show was being considered, and then here comes a real life story that helped give it some shape.

=== Casting ===
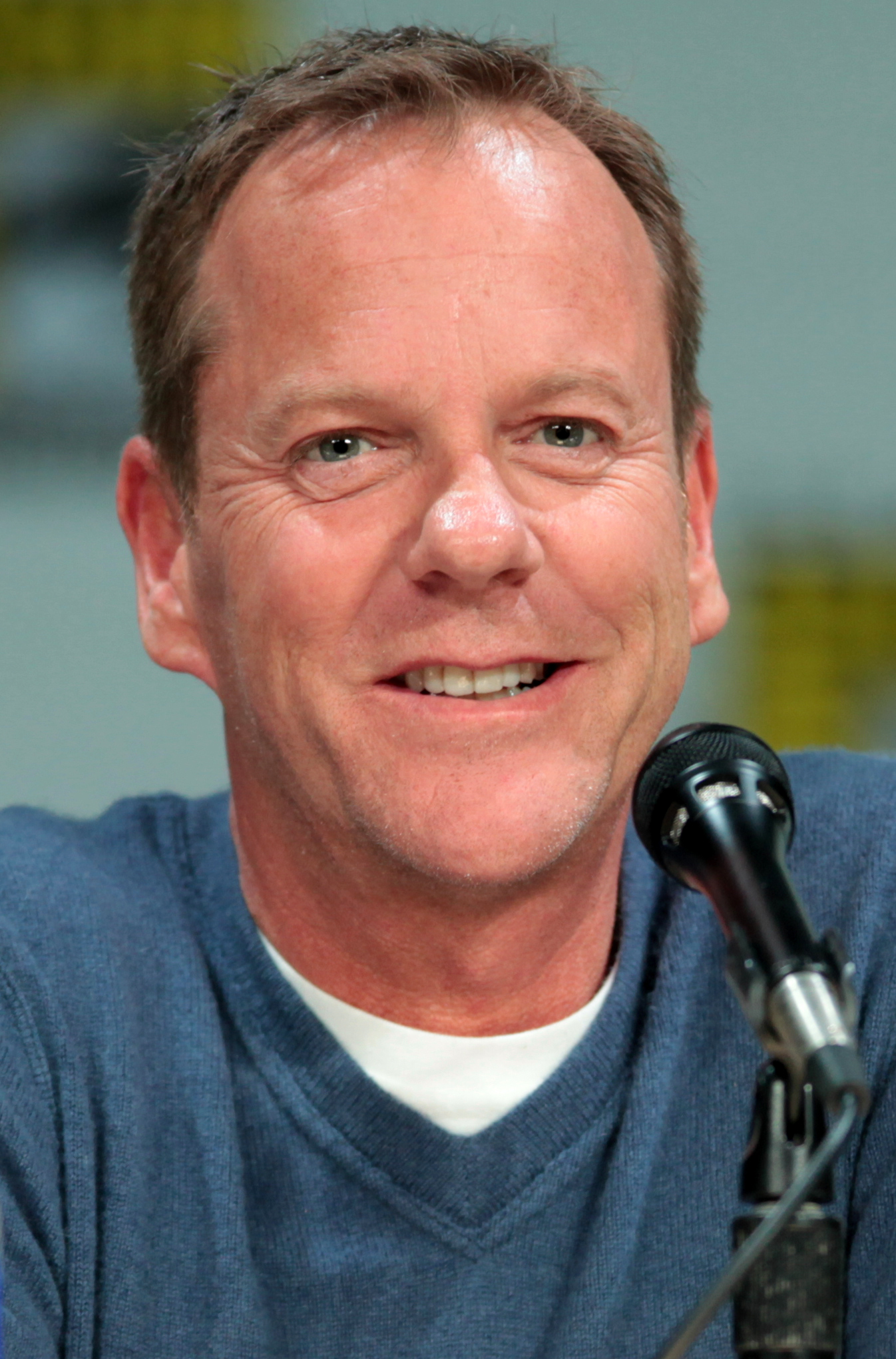
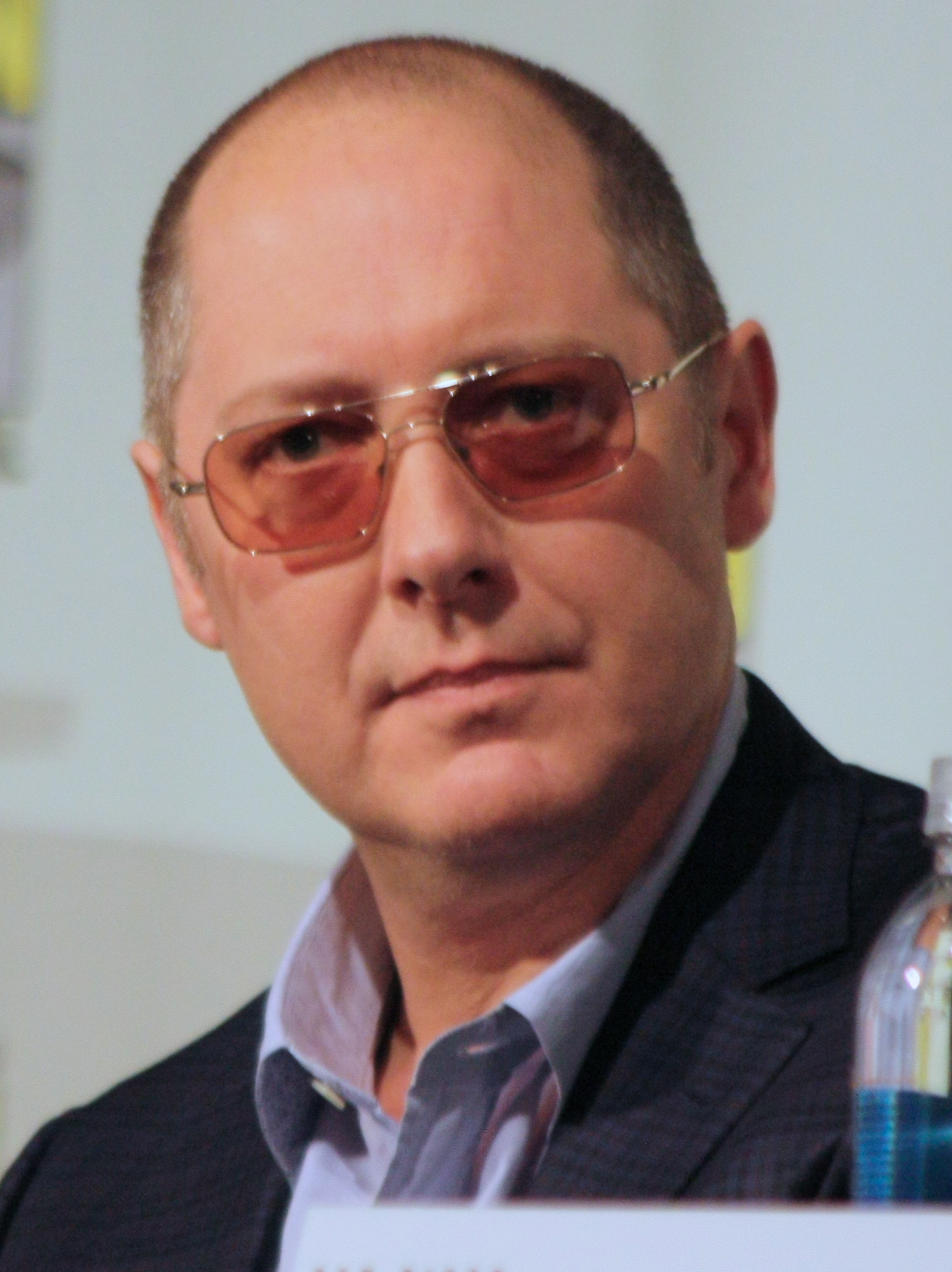
Kiefer Sutherland (left) was offered the role of Raymond Reddington before James Spader (right) was considered for it

Eisendrath said the casting process for "Pilot" was difficult. In February 2013, Zap2it reported that NBC offered Kiefer Sutherland the lead role of Raymond Reddington. After considering other actors for the role, Einsendrath and Bokencamp called James Spader to see if he would be interested in it. Feeling confident in Spader's understanding of the character, they cast him three days before filming began.

Megan Boone took a week to prepare for her audition as FBI profiler Elizabeth Keen. After getting called back for multiple auditions, Boone accepted the role as the female lead in the series in March.

=== Filming ===
The episode debuted the series for the 2013–14 season. Written by series creator Jon Bokenkamp, Eisendrath joined John Davis and John Fox of Davis Entertainment as executive producers, while Joe Carnahan directed the episode.

Despite being set in Washington, D.C., the series is mainly filmed in the same Manhattan studio where Law & Order was filmed for 20 years. Producer Richard Heus said they chose to film specific Washington, D.C. locations for "Pilot" because they were "iconic American locations". These locations included the Lincoln Memorial, the Washington Monument, and the National Mall. In March, NBC filmed the bridge action scene for "Pilot" on the Michael Valente Memorial Bridge in Long Beach. Since it took two days to film that scene, northbound traffic had to be diverted onto one lane of the southbound bridge. NBC covered all overtime costs and permit fees, as the scene involved numerous special effects, such as fire, smoke, and car collisions.

== Reception ==
=== Ratings ===
"Pilot" premiered on NBC on September 23, 2013, in the 10–11 p.m. time slot. The episode garnered a 3.8/10 Nielsen rating with 12.58 million viewers, making it the highest-rated show in its time slot. The series premiere was the eleventh most-watched television show of the week, and was the highest-rated 10 p.m. drama since Revolution on September 17, 2012. In addition, the episode added 5.696 million DVR viewers within seven days after its original broadcast, bringing a total of 18.279 million viewers.

=== Reviews ===
Reviews for "Pilot" were generally favorable. Jeff Jensen of Entertainment Weekly gave the episode a B+, calling the show "a slick action-adventure tale with knotty plotting and zeitgeisty villains". Hank Steuver of The Washington Post praised the episode for being "stylish and swiftly paced" with "intriguing plot twists", but felt that there was "not a lot of motivation to keep coming back". Rob Owen of the Pittsburgh Post-Gazette felt that the "tone change" in the episode was "a bit abrupt", but noted that "viewers who can handle the twists and turns will be intrigued". James Poniewozik gave a mixed review of the episode, noting that the show is "setting itself up to be largely a bad-guy-of-the-week show" and that its success will "depend on how interesting Reddington and Keen’s backstories become". Matthew Gilbert of The Boston Globe said the episode was "stylish and expertly paced", saying that "it is never boring". Dorothy Rabinowitz of The Wall Street Journal gave a positive review of the episode, saying that the episode "reaches undeniably satisfying levels of menace".

Several critics praised James Spader's performance as Raymond "Red" Reddington in "Pilot". Diane Werts of Newsday labeled Spader "TV's most voracious thespian", but felt that he was "the only one who actually [understood] the gameplay" of the series. Mary McNamara of Los Angeles Times said that Spader was "the ace in the hole" of the episode, noting that "the sheer swoony pleasure of watching James Spader chew through scenes and scenery with epicurean delight" was the "reason to watch" the show. Brian Lowry of Variety said that Spader was the only actor "that lifts The Blacklist above mundane", saying that Spader did not get enough screen time. Maureen Ryan of The Huffington Post praised Spader's performance in the episode, stating that Spader "digs into this part with all the relish of Hannibal Lecter tucking into some organic escarole-and-human parts pie".
