= Jonathan Shapiro (writer) =

American lawyer and writer

Jonathan Shapiro is a television writer and producer, attorney, adjunct law professor, public speaker, and former Assistant U.S. Attorney as well as Of Counsel at Kirkland & Ellis. He is the co-creator and Executive Producer, with David E. Kelley, of Amazon Prime's TV show Goliath starring Billy Bob Thornton. Shapiro has written fiction, such as Deadly Force: A Lizzie Scott Novel (ABA Publishing 2014) as well as two books of non-fiction: How to Be Abe Lincoln: Seven Steps to Leading a Legendary Life (ABA Publishing 2023) Lawyers, Liars, and the Art of Storytelling (Ankerwycke 2015). Shapiro has also written episodes of TV shows such as The Calling, The Blacklist, Boston Legal, The Practice, Mr. Mercedes and Life and is also a frequent collaborator of fellow attorney-writer-producer David E. Kelley. He was also a consulting producer on the HBO Series The Undoing. Shapiro's first play, Sisters in Law, based on the relationship between U.S. Supreme Court Justices Sandra Day O'Connor and Ruth Bader Ginsburg premiered as part of the Phoenix Theater Company 2019-2020 Season. Seven different productions of the play have followed, including in New York, as well as the Wallis Annenberg Center, Los Angeles, California.

== Early life and background ==
Shapiro received an undergraduate degree and graduate degree at Harvard University in 1985, where he was a Rhodes Scholar at Oriel College at Oxford University, and his J.D. degree, at the University of California Berkeley School of Law in 1990. Shapiro is Jewish. He serves on the advisory board of Indiana University's Borns Jewish Studies Center.

== Legal career ==
While attending Berkeley Law's Boalt Hall, Shapiro worked as a staff writer for The Recorder from 1987 to 1990. He was also a Contributing Editor at The Ring magazine covering fights in the U.K. and U.S. from 1987 to 1993. Upon graduation from law school, Shapiro became a Honors Program Trial Attorney with the U.S. Department of Justice Organized Crime & Racketeering Division (1990–1992) in Washington, D.C.. Following that position, he served as an Assistant U.S. Attorney for the United States Attorneys Office at the United States District Court for the Central District of California for six years from 1992 to 1998. He then entered private practice, working briefly at O'Melveny & Myers in 1998 before returning to the public sector as Chief of Staff for Lt. Governor Cruz Bustamante from 1999 to 2000. From 2013 to 2015, while writing TV pilots, Shapiro was Of Counsel at Kirkland & Ellis LLP.

In 1981, Shapiro served a one-year term as the student member of the California State Board of Education. In 2010, he was appointed by the California State Senate to a four-year term on the Commission on Government Economy and Efficiency (the Little Hoover Commission). He was re-appointed in 2014, and was later elected Chairman of the commission. Shapiro, who handled a number of pro bono political asylum cases, was also the founder and director of Public Counsel's Emergency Fund for Torture Victims.

Shapiro also was an adjunct professor of law at the University of Southern California School of Law, where he taught federal criminal law, as well as Loyola Law School, and the UCLA School of Law.

== Additional TV/film career and writing ==
In 2014 at the National Capital Chesapeake Bay Chapter's Emmy Awards held in Washington, D.C., Shapiro won an Emmy Award for the short film/PSA Fair and Free, which he conceived, wrote and produced and which also featured former U.S. Supreme Court Justice Sandra Day O'Connor. The short film was part of the National Association of Women Judges Informed Voters Project, which encourages women of all backgrounds to exercise their right to vote and make a difference in the electoral process. Shapiro also received a separate Emmy nomination for his script.

Shapiro has also received a Peabody Award for his writing work on Boston Legal and several Humanitas Awards for his writing and/or producing on Boston Legal (for the episode "Roe v. Wade: The Musical" (2008)) and The Practice (for the episodes "Honor Code" (2002) and "Final Judgment" (2006)), and was further nominated for an Edgar Allan Poe Award for his writing on The Practice episode "Killing Time" (1997).
