= Lukas Reiter =

Television executive and former lawyer

- Education: Northwestern University (BS); Temple University Beasley School of Law (JD)
- Occupations: Television producer, writer, attorney
- Spouse: Elizabeth Bogush (m. 2005)

Lukas Reiter is an American television executive and former lawyer. As a law student he was a mock trial competitor, and he later became a writer for The Practice. He has also written for television shows such as Boston Legal, Close to Home, Outlaw and The Forgotten. He has also served as a producer for shows such as Law & Order, and The Firm.

== Early law career ==
Reiter was a cum laude of the Temple University Beasley School of Law and is a Northwestern University alumnus with a Bachelor of Science degree in speech. He won the mock trial championship at the 1995 National Trial Competition with Robert E. Kelly. He won the George A. Spiegelberg Award for Best Oral Advocate at the 1995 American College of Trial Lawyers National Trial Competition. Reiter felt he would become a trial lawyer. After obtaining his Juris Doctor, he became an Assistant District Attorney in Queens County, New York for the Homicide Investigations Bureau. He worked under Richard Brown.

== Television executive career ==
Reiter's first script, which was about his professional experiences up to that date caught the attention of Creative Artists Agency agent Peter Micelli, who has continued to be his agent. He first became a writer for David E. Kelley on The Practice and later for Boston Legal, serving both as supervising producer. In 2002, Reiter was nominated for the Edgar Award in the Best Television Episode category for The Practice's "Killing Time" episode (September 30, 2001) in which he co-wrote the teleplay with Teleplay by Jonathan Shapiro, Peter Blake & David E. Kelley. That year, he won a Humanitas Prize when The Practice's "Honor Code" episode (November 18, 2001) which he co-wrote with Kelly tied with Aaron Sorkin's "Two Cathedrals" episode of The West Wing.

Having been a fan of both the movie version and the book of The Firm, Reiter sought out their creator, John Grisham, to explain his own curiosity about what happened to the characters beyond the endings of those parts of the franchise. Later, Reiter worked with Jerry Bruckheimer on the series The Forgotten and Close to Home and then served as an executive producer for The Firm. Reiter was the creator for The Firm.

In 2013, Reiter joined the writing staff of NBC's The Blacklist, serving as a Consulting Producer, and later as a Co-Executive Producer in the show's first season, and eventually rising to the role of Executive Producer through the show's first seven seasons.
