= Hisham Tawfiq =

American actor

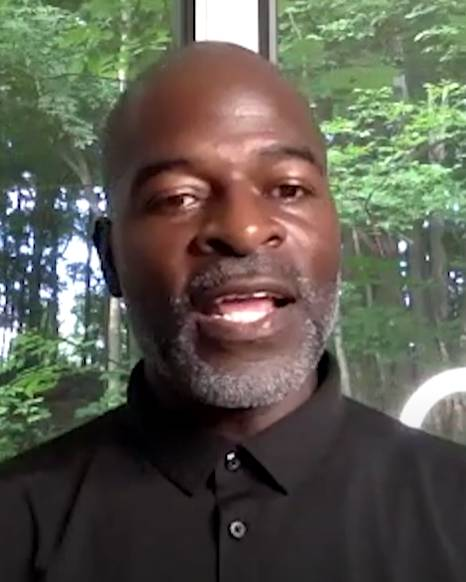
- Tawfiq in 2023
- Born: May 17, 1970 (age 56); New York City, New York
- Occupation: Actor
- Years active: 2002-present
- Television: The Blacklist
- Spouse: Spirit Tawfiq

Hisham Tawfiq (born May 17, 1970) is an American actor. He is best known for playing Dembe Zuma in NBC's The Blacklist.

== Early life ==
Born in New York City, Tawfiq discovered his love of the arts while performing the poem "I Know Why the Caged Bird Sings" by Maya Angelou in high school. Tawfiq studied at the Negro Ensemble Company, known for educating actors such as Denzel Washington and Ossie Davis. He also studied with coach Susan Batson.

Prior to pursuing a full acting career, Tawfiq served in the U.S. Marines, deployed during Operation Desert Storm. From 1994 to 1996, Tawfiq worked as a corrections officer in the Sing Sing Correctional Facility in Ossining, New York. While pursuing his acting career, Tawfiq also served as a firefighter for 20 years with the New York City Fire Department.

== Career ==
Tawfiq performed with The Arkansas Repertory Theatre in Intimate Apparel and played Walter Lee Younger in a production of A Raisin in the Sun, which Tawfiq has said to be his dream role.

Tawfiq starred in the BET film Gun Hill as Capt. Sanford, commander of a counter-crime task force. On television, Tawfiq has appeared in Lights Out, Law & Order spin-offs Special Victims Unit and Criminal Intent, Kings, Golden Boy, 30 Rock, and the 2013 NBC remake of Ironside.

Tawfiq played Dembe in NBC's The Blacklist. Starting with season 3, he was promoted to series regular.

== Filmography ==
Film

Year	Film	Role	Notes
2009	Notorious	Fatigue Guy	
2010	Say Grace Before Drowning	Chris	
2010	Counterfeit	Malik	
2010	Contact Zone	Prince	
2010	Five Minarets in New York	High Rolla	
2011	Crazy Beats Strong Every Time	Kofi	
2013	Dead Man Down	Jamaican Mike	
2014	Gun Hill	Capt. Sanford	
2017	Dope Fiend	Prince	
2018	Skate Kitchen	Lawrence	
2018	Jinn	Imam Khalid	
2020	To Live and Die in Bed-Stuy	Big Ed	
2021	Maya and Her Lover	Father	

Television

Year	Series	Role	Notes
2007–2021	Law & Order: Special Victims Unit	Firefighter #1/FDNY Vestry/Jules	3 episodes
2009	Kings	Serviceman Walter	5 episodes
2010	Law & Order: Criminal Intent	Scaryman	Episode: "Lost Children of the Blood" (S9 Ep11)
2011	Lights Out	Jo Jo Reade	
2012	30 Rock	African Dictator	2 episodes
2013	Golden Boy	Father Steven Truitt	
2013	Ironside	Cop	1 episode
2013–2023	The Blacklist	Dembe Zuma	Recurring Role (Seasons 1–2); Main Cast (Seasons 3–10)
2021	Harlem	Dr. Obinna Tseggai	Episode: "Once Upon a Time in Harlem"
2024	The Equalizer (2021 TV series)	Sameer Bentang	1 episode

Theater

Year	Piece	Role	Notes
	A Raisin in the Sun	Walter Lee Younger	
	Intimate Apparel	George Armstrong	
	A Soldiers Play	Henson	
	Offspring	Kyle	
	Bow Wow Club	Sal	
	Shaka Zulu	Shaka	
