= The Front (The Blacklist) =

- The Blacklist episode
- Episode no.: Season 2 Episode 5
- Directed by: Steven A. Adelson
- Story by: Adam Sussman
- Teleplay by: Jim Campolongo; Adam Sussman
- Production code: 205
- Original air date: October 20, 2014

Guest appearances
- Hisham Tawfiq as Dembe Zuma; Hal Ozsan as Ezra; Michael Laurence as Maddox Beck; Clark Middleton as Glen Carter; Scottie Thompson as Zoe D'Antonio; Geoffrey Cantor as Phil Ryerson; Jennifer Van Dyck as Lillian Sharp

Episode chronology
← Previous "Dr. Linus Creel"	Next → "The Mombasa Cartel"
- The Blacklist season 2

"The Front" is the fifth episode of the second season of the American crime drama The Blacklist. The episode premiered in the United States on NBC on October 20, 2014.

== Plot ==
Maddox Beck, an eco-terrorist, steals an ancient clay painting from his wife to map out the location of a dormant pneumonic plague virus. Beck successfully recovers the virus and weaponizes it to infect his followers and create a worldwide epidemic. The Task Force contains most of the followers, but Samar and Elizabeth are infected by one of them at Dulles International Airport. With Aram's help, Reddington learns Beck's location and steals a supply of synthesized vaccine, as well as a necklace and a key, before leaving Beck to commit suicide. The vaccine is delivered to the Task Force for distribution to infected agents and civilians. Meanwhile, Reddington, now knowing who is believed to be Jennifer's (Scottie Thompson) whereabouts and identity, covertly watches her from a distance. Having failed to convince Reddington to remove the guard he assigned to her, Elizabeth pays a look-alike to distract the guard while she secretly visits a basement at an undisclosed location.

== Reception ==
=== Ratings ===
"The Front" premiered on NBC on October 20, 2014 in the 10–11 p.m. time slot. The episode garnered a 2.4/7 Nielsen rating with 9.34 million viewers, making it the highest-rated show in its timeslot and the twentieth highest-rated television show of the week.

=== Reviews ===
Ross Bonaime of Paste gave the episode a 6.0/10. He wrote: "After a steady run of surprisingly solid Blacklist episodes, it's a shame that the show reverted to the way it used to do things. The last few episodes were fun because they were silly, and intentionally so. 'The Front' represents a return to the show attempting to be serious, and being unintentionally funny and ridiculous in the process. Hopefully this is just an uncharacteristic speedbump in the show's process of actually getting better this season".

Jason Evans of The Wall Street Journal gave a negative review of the episode, calling it "a pretty lackluster episode". He went on to say: "Not much happened to advance the overall plot. Red found his daughter, but we still don’t know much about her. Samar and Aram certainly seem to be connecting (so much for the fan theory that Samar likes Liz). We still don't know what is behind the door, though the previews for next week promise to reveal that to us".
