= Dr. James Covington =

- The Blacklist episode
- Episode no.: Season 2 Episode 3
- Directed by: Karen Gaviola
- Written by: Lukas Reiter; J. R. Orci
- Production code: 203
- Original air date: October 6, 2014

Guest appearances
- Mary-Louise Parker as Naomi Hyland; Hisham Tawfiq as Dembe Zuma; Susan Blommaert as Mr. Kaplan; Joseph Siravo as Niko Demakis; Hal Ozsan as Ezra; Ron Cephas Jones as Dr. James Covington; Jason Kravits as Dr. Gordon Albee; Norm Lewis as J. P. Laskin; Stephen Beach as Ronald Cassell; E.J. Carroll as Bernard Babbitt; Geoffrey Cantor as Phil Ryerson; Eva Kaminsky as Ellen Wyatt; Daniel Oreskes as Teddy Russo; Paul Reubens as Mr. Vargas

Episode chronology
| ← Previous "Monarch Douglas Bank" | Next → "Dr. Linus Creel" |
- The Blacklist season 2

"Dr. James Covington" is the third episode of the second season of the American crime drama The Blacklist. The episode premiered in the United States on NBC on October 6, 2014.

== Plot ==
Dr. James Covington is a disgraced surgeon running an illegal organ transplant business to extort criminals. With the aid of a recruited Samar, the Task Force starts investigating one of Covington's recent victims, Paul Wyatt. The investigation into Wyatt leads the Task Force to a medical examiner who supplies Covington with recently harvested organs. With the aid of the medical examiner, Liz and Ressler attempt to tail a courier responsible for transporting a heart transplant, only for the courier to die during the pursuit. Liz and Ressler come across an underground hospital utilized by Covington, attempting to arrest him. Liz and Ressler delay their arrest after being persuaded by Covington to finish a surgery on a young boy. Meanwhile, Reddington meets with business contacts involved with international shipping in order to outmaneuver Berlin. One of the contacts, Niko, attempts to double-cross Reddington in order to serve under Berlin's employment. Unbeknownst to Niko, a double agent (Paul Reubens) secretly working for Reddington, exposes Niko during the course of an attempted betrayal, prompting Reddington to kill Niko. During the aftermath, Liz has a brief conversation with Samar about her mistrust. Samar validates Liz's claims, and is later warned that her recruitment is part of Reddington's machinations. Meanwhile, Reddington and Dembe drive to a remote cabin where Naomi is staying, only for Naomi to slap Reddington.

== Reception ==
=== Ratings ===
"Dr. James Covington" premiered on NBC on October 6, 2014, in the 10–11 p.m. time slot. The episode garnered a 2.6/8 Nielsen rating with 10.07 million viewers, making it the highest-rated show in its timeslot and the sixteenth highest-rated television show of the week.

=== Reviews ===
Ross Bonaime of Paste gave the episode a 7.9/10, calling it "the best episode so far this season". He wrote: "The strength of 'Dr. James Covington' lies in its ability to not take itself so seriously. It has fun with these dumb, little ideas, and it feels so much more enjoyable as a show because of it. If things could lighten up like this every week, they might finally be on to something".

Jason Evans of The Wall Street Journal gave a positive review of the episode: "I always love the way The Blacklist ties the criminal of the week into Red's larger plots. This week was especially clever in that regard. Who saw Dr. Covington being connected to the Indonesian business deal?!"
