= Scottie Thompson =

Scottie Thompson may refer to:

- Scottie Thompson (actress) (born 1981), American actress
- Scottie Thompson (basketball) (born 1993), Filipino basketball player
