= Tom Connolly (The Blacklist) =

- The Blacklist episode
- Episode no.: Season 2 Episode 22
- Directed by: Michael Watkins
- Written by: John Eisendrath; Jon Bokenkamp
- Production code: 222
- Original air date: May 14, 2015

Episode chronology
← Previous "Karakurt"	Next → "The Troll Farmer"
- The Blacklist season 2

"Tom Connolly" is the twenty-second episode and season finale of the second season of the American crime drama The Blacklist. The episode premiered in the United States on NBC on May 14, 2015.

== Plot ==
Elizabeth is framed for the assassination of a U.S. Senator and is now on the run with Red's help. The Attorney General, Tom Connolly, forces Cooper on administrative leave for keeping Keen from being questioned. Liz is captured for questioning, but later escapes with the help of Reddington and Cooper. Angered at Reddington for refusing to tell the truth about her mother, Elizabeth seeks Tom's assistance, and the two eventually give in to their romantic feelings for each other. Meanwhile, Red brings together the world's leading investigative journalists and reveals the Fulcrum's contents to publicly expose the Cabal. Through Elizabeth, Cooper discovers that he never had cancer; his diagnosis was a hoax orchestrated by the Cabal through Connolly. Cooper angrily confronts Connolly together with Elizabeth. Connolly defensively threatens to brand the Task Force as a rogue unit and have it disbanded, then prosecute its members on politically motivated charges. Elizabeth snaps and fatally shoots him. The shooting triggers her memory of the night of the fire: she shot and killed her abusive father in order to protect her mother. Elizabeth escapes police capture with Reddington's help, and confesses to having regained her memory, as well as her full understanding of Reddington's desire to protect her. They both escape, while Tom leaves in his boat. Reven Wright appoints Ressler as the new director of the task force, while Cooper hands in his badge and is questioned for Connolly's murder. Elizabeth's name is put next to Reddington's on the FBI Ten Most Wanted list.

== Reception ==
=== Ratings ===
The season finale premiered as "Masha Rostova" on NBC on May 14, 2015 in the 9–10 p.m. time slot, before being renamed "Tom Connolly". The episode garnered a 1.6/5 Nielsen rating with 7.49 million viewers, making it the third-highest-rated show in its time slot behind ABC's Scandal and CBS's The Big Bang Theory. It was also the twentieth-highest-rated television show of the week.

=== Reviews ===
Ross Bonaime of Paste gave the episode a 7.7/10: "'Masha Rostova' is largely more of the same for The Blacklist in the mystery department, which is to say, not much is revealed. However, 'Masha Rostova' does gives us a look at what could be a largely improved third season. This second season has ended with some of The Blacklist's strongest episodes and takes some steps in fixing problems that this show has had since its beginning".

Jason Evans of The Wall Street Journal gave a positive review of the episode: "Whew! It is hard to see how The Blacklist can ever be the same after this. It was one thing to prove that Liz was framed for the murder of the Senator, but she just gunned down the Attorney General in cold blood".
