= The Decembrist (The Blacklist) =

- The Blacklist episode
- Episode no.: Season 2 Episode 8
- Directed by: Michael Watkins
- Written by: Jon Bokenkamp; John Eisendrath
- Original air date: November 10, 2014

Guest appearances
- Peter Stormare as Berlin/Milos Kirchoff; Alan Alda as Alan Fitch/The Decembrist; Scottie Thompson as Jennifer/Zoe D'Antonio; Tom Noonan as The Stewmaker

Episode chronology
← Previous "The Scimitar"	Next → "Luther Braxton"
- The Blacklist season 2

"The Decembrist" is the eighth episode of the second season of the television series The Blacklist, aired on NBC on November 10, 2014. The episode was directed by Michael Watkins, and written by Jon Bokenkamp and John Eisendrath. This episode serves as the season's fall finale; the show returned on February 1, 2015 after the 49th Super Bowl.

The Blacklist number for this episode is No. 12.

In this episode, Raymond "Red" Reddington (James Spader) reveals the whereabouts of his rival Berlin's (Peter Stormare) long-lost daughter, and attempts to hunt down the person responsible for his belief that she was dead. Federal agent Keen (Megan Boone) ponders murdering her ex-husband Tom Keen (Ryan Eggold) after chaining him in a secret hole for months.

Upon airing, the episode was watched by 9.75 million viewers, and attained an 18-49 rating of 2.5, placing first in its time slot and second for the night, behind only its lead-in show The Voice.

== Plot ==
Four months ago, Elizabeth (Megan Boone) shoots Tom (Ryan Eggold) and lies to Reddington (James Spader) about his death. Instead, she keeps him in chains on a boat. She interrogates him for months about people on The Blacklist.

In the present, Red meets with Berlin aka Milos Kirchhoff and reveals that his daughter, Zoe (Scottie Thompson), is alive. Zoe says that a man named The Decembrist helped her flee after the Kursk bombing after which his father was captured. Red believes The Decembrist faked her death using The Stewmaker's help and sent body parts implying that Reddington killed Zoe. Red asks Elizabeth to track down The Decembrist in return for Berlin's whereabouts. FBI's investigation leads to the Russian finance minister, Kiryl Morozov (Alon Abutbul). Red and Berlin head to Russia to interrogate him. He points them to Alan Fitch (Alan Alda) as the person responsible for the bombing. Red meets with Alan and warns him about Berlin.

A security guard finds Tom on the boat and Tom kills him despite Keen's objection. Red tells Elizabeth that he knows about Tom; he expresses his disappointment and asks her to interrogate him about Berlin because he kidnapped Alan Fitch. Tom agrees to help but only if she releases him. Elizabeth asks for Ressler's (Diego Klattenhoff) assistance and releases him once he gives them Alan Fitch's location.

FBI finds Fitch tied up with a bomb around his neck. Meanwhile, Berlin takes Zoe to lunch. She pretends to be uncomfortable with his security so he orders his men away, at which point Red appears and asks how to disable the bomb. Berlin realizes his daughter has betrayed him. With Reddington's help, she disappears. Fitch asks to speak with Red and sends the bomb squad away once he realises it can't be stopped. Fitch asks Red if he has "the Fulcrum", to which he replies that the bomb can't be stopped. He tells Red the combination to a St. Petersburg safe, but the bomb explodes before he can reveal the safe's full location.

Later, Red and Berlin share a drink while Berlin reminisces about better times during the Cold War. When he's finished, Red murders him. Later, Red hands an envelope to Tom, ordering him never to see Elizabeth again. As he is leaving, Tom tells Reddington that he never told her about them.

== Reception ==
=== Ratings ===
The episode was watched by 9.75 million American viewers, and attained an 18-49 rating/share of 2.5/8. This marks an increase in viewership and 18-49 ratings from the previous episode, which was watched by 9.30 million viewers and attained an 18-49 rating/share of 2.4/7. However, this also marks a significant decrease in viewership and ratings from the first season's fall finale, which brought in 11.67 million viewers and an 18-49 rating/share of 3.2/9. The show placed first in its timeslot, and second for the night, behind only its lead-in show The Voice.

Including DVR viewing, the episode was watched by a total of 15.96 million viewers, and attained an 18-49 rating of 4.5. The Canadian broadcast received 1.99 million viewers, making it the third most-watched telecast of the night and the twelfth of the week.

=== Critical reception ===
Commentators gave the episode highly positive reviews, saying that the episode lived up to its anticipation. Jodi Walker of Entertainment Weekly gave the episode a highly positive review, commenting mainly on the episode's anticipation paying off: "Does The Blacklist still have it? This season's self-proclaimed "huge reveals" have all been largely foreshadowed in previews and Voice commercial breaks: Tom behind the door, Zoe as Berlin's daughter, Fitch as Berlin and Red's common enemy. But, The Blacklist stuck the landing where it counted tonight, when we finally got to see what all of those reveals mean to the world of Red and Lizzie. After the plethora of reveals in the last 10 minutes - or as NBC marketing would say, "You won't believe the. LAST. TEN. MINUTES" - my jaw has resumed its formerly gaping position". Brent Furdyk of ET Canada said "the gripping thriller ended the first half of its second season in true over-the-top fashion with two major characters biting the dust".

Jim McMahon of IGN gave the episode a 7.2 out of 10, saying that the show's midseason finale "goes out with some potentially big plot developments and a small bang".

Sean McKenna of TV Fanatic gave the episode a 4.6 out of 5: "Perhaps it being a fall finale helped amp things up, but it was so satisfying to get the entire hour focused on the bigger story. This was the engaging episode that I'd been waiting to get again, and I'm so glad how it turned out".

Andrea Reiher of Zap2it gave the episode (and the first half of the season) a positive review: "The first season [...] sometimes suffered from putting too much emphasis on the case of the week, leaving the overarching mythology barely present or even nonexistent. But Season 2 has pulled off the masterful job of providing cases each week that are wrapped up within the hour while most weeks also connecting in some way to the larger picture. It has made the drama more serialized and it became apparent during the fall finale that the season is neatly divided into acts (probably three), the first of which has come to a close with some events that perfectly set up Act II".
