= Dr. Linus Creel =

- The Blacklist episode
- Episode no.: Season 2 Episode 4
- Directed by: Michael Watkins
- Written by: Mike Ostrowski
- Production code: 204
- Original air date: October 13, 2014

Guest appearances
- Mary-Louise Parker as Naomi Hyland; David Costabile as Dr. Linus Creel; Hisham Tawfiq as Dembe Zuma; Hal Ozsan as Ezra; Lee Tergesen as Frank Hyland; Cameron Scoggins as Duncan Prince; David Fonteno as Senator Sheridan; Paul Reubens as Mr. Vargas

Episode chronology
← Previous "Dr. James Covington"	Next → "The Front"
- The Blacklist season 2

"Dr. Linus Creel" is the fourth episode of the second season of the American crime drama The Blacklist. The episode premiered in the United States on NBC on October 13, 2014.

== Plot ==
Reddington asks Naomi for information about Jennifer and makes preparations to relocate Naomi and her husband, Frank. After being rebuffed by Naomi, Reddington uses his double agent Mr. Vargas to steal a dog from Frank's mistress, and blackmails Frank into starting his life over with Naomi. Meanwhile, the Task Force is directed by Reddington into investigating a bank shooting in Reston. During the spike of apparent "random violent crimes", all of the listed suspects were civilians with no prior criminal records, having been manipulated to violently act out at their breaking point. Cooper directs the Task Force into investigating black operations budgets funding mind control projects. Utilizing a codebreaker suggested by Samar, Reddington and Liz bring a heavily redacted report given by Senator Sheridan for decoding. The decoding of the documents leads the Task Force into identifying social psychologist Dr. Linus Creel (David Costabile). Creel had been engineering the violent acts in order to publish his research regarding genetic screening, going far enough to martyr himself. The Task Force apprehends a college student attempting to kill Creel, only for Liz to be held hostage by Creel. During the stand-off, a sniper in Reddington's employment kills Creel, having been revealed as Liz's motel neighbor in the previous episode. Liz heads to the remote cabin where Naomi is staying and attempts to question her about her past with Reddington to no avail. It also becomes clear Naomi knows the connection between Liz and Reddington. Before leaving, Naomi reveals privately to Reddington that Jennifer left on her own accord. The episode ends in what appears to be an old warehouse with Liz contemplating a locked door with a ring of keys in her hand.

== Reception ==
=== Ratings ===
"Dr. Linus Creel" premiered on NBC on October 13, 2014, in the 10–11 p.m. time slot. The episode garnered a 2.8/8 Nielsen rating with 9.76 million viewers, making it the highest-rated show in its timeslot and the fourteenth highest-rated television show of the week.

=== Reviews ===
Jodi Walker of Entertainment Weekly gave a mixed review of the episode: "Tonight was a well-made and well-placed, if not totally frustrating, episode of The Blacklist. It raises 1,000 questions, sure; it doesn't answer any, alright, yes; and no one is really trying to deal with that cliffhanger of an ending, absolutely not".

Ross Bonaime of Paste gave the episode a 7.9/10. He wrote: "Already this second season has been a huge step above the first season. The characters have had some nice depth added to them, the weekly stories are much more fun (even if they are quite ridiculous), and the overall story feels like it's evolving—maybe at a glacial pace, but moving nonetheless. The Blacklist is at a high point; the biggest mistake it could make right now is to devolve back to the type of show it was before".
