= Luther Braxton =

- The Blacklist episode
- Episode no.: Season 2 Episode 9
- Directed by: Joe Carnahan
- Story by: J. R. Orci; Lukas Reiter; John Eisendrath; Jon Bokenkamp
- Teleplay by: Jon Bokenkamp; John Eisendrath
- Original air date: February 1, 2015

Guest appearances
- David Strathairn as The Director; Janel Moloney as Kat Goodson; John Ventimiglia as Warden Ramsey Mills; Scott A. Martin as Desmond; Ron Perlman as Luther Braxton

Episode chronology
← Previous "The Decembrist"	Next → "Luther Braxton Conclusion"
- The Blacklist season 2

"Luther Braxton" is the ninth episode of the second season of American crime drama The Blacklist, which aired on February 1, 2015 after NBC concluded coverage of Super Bowl XLIX. It is the first part of a two-part episode which concluded on February 5, 2015.

The Blacklist number for the episode is No. 21.

== Plot ==
News broadcasts highlight the military's capture in Asia of Reddington (James Spader), whose current whereabouts are undisclosed to the public. Reddington has been placed in "The Factory", an oil rig-type high-security prison in the middle of the Bering Sea. Reddington twice offers bribes of $50,000 to a prison guard (Scott A. Martin), the first to see the warden and the next to escape, since Red knows that Factory inmate Luther Todd Braxton (Ron Perlman) is going to escape and wreak havoc and drastically threaten Red's interests and life.

Assistant Director Cooper (Harry Lennix) meets with high-level NCS members Kat Goodson (Janel Moloney) and her unnamed superior (David Strathairn), who has replaced Alan Fitch as the NCS's board director. They inform Cooper of the situation, prompting him to dispatch agents Keen (Megan Boone), Ressler (Diego Klattenhoff) and Navabi (Mozhan Marnò) to the Factory to extract Reddington. Meanwhile, Braxton cleverly breaks out of his cell and assembles a team of criminals. The three FBI agents are ambushed by Braxton's men upon arrival, with Ressler and Samar being captured while Liz is able to escape.

Liz reunites with Reddington, who tells her he didn't want her here. Reddington explains that he planned his arrest to stop Braxton from obtaining "The Fulcrum", a data file containing highly confidential and compromising information on many very powerful and important people. The Fulcrum is not physically in the prison, but access to all real-time USA intelligence information is available there. Red and Liz meet with a group of factory inmates to plan their efforts to foil Braxton's scheme. One man advises that they go to the boiler room and cause an explosion that will destroy the Factory's server. Braxton calls Reddington over the phone and the two have a brief confrontational talk.

Braxton intends to get the code needed to access the Factory's servers, which Goodson is determined to prevent. The FBI attempts to negotiate with Braxton, who responds by executing the warden (John Ventimiglia) and threatening to have Samar hanged. Cooper reluctantly gives the code to Braxton, whose men then go to the servers and gain access to the secret intelligence system.

Liz crawls through narrow ventilation tunnels to get to the boiler room and then lets Red in. There they work together to increase the pressure in the boilers until an explosion occurs, incapacitating Red and causing Braxton to lose the server connection. Liz unsuccessfully attempts to resuscitate Red, thinks him dead, and ends up getting captured and taken to Braxton. Elsewhere, the NCS director is urged by his coworkers to have Braxton and Red eliminated, and orders Goodson to order an air strike on the facility.

Reddington's helpers 'wake him up', he obtains and brandishes a shotgun, making his way through the wild prison inmates until he arrives at Braxton's location, shoots his men down and subdues him. Braxton begins to see and explain that he knows about Red and Liz's history in the house fire, how Red "came for Liz" and that Liz is "the one". Red urges Liz to shoot Braxton, but the missile strike hits the prison first.

== Production ==
Series creator Jon Bokenkamp—in an interview for The Hollywood Reporter—said that the two-part story arc resembles a "big heightened event movie in a very contained way." When asked whether or not the episode will be fit for new viewers post-Super Bowl, Bokenkamp said:

It's certainly an episode designed for a new viewer to just dive right into. In watching it, I think they will very easily get a sense of what the show is, who Reddington is, what the show tastes and feels and smells like. It's an easy show to sort of dive right into at this point, but also I think we've designed some really fun revelations and some [surprising payoffs] for people who are ardent fans.

In regard to preparation for new viewers, executive producer John Eisendrath said in an interview for Entertainment Weekly:

Yes, we knew that it was going to be the Super Bowl. We felt as if, first of all, we were going to get a lot of viewers who had never seen the show before. We wanted to make sure that we had an episode that was a good introductory episode to Red and the situation that he is in with the FBI and a standalone case. We didn't want to confuse any new viewers with anything that may linger in other episodes that are serialized. And we wanted to have a big, impactful event for those new viewers.

In casting Ron Perlman as Luther Braxton—the episode's title character—Bokenkamp said "I've been a fan of Ron Perlman for a long time. He just brings this great presence to the show. I think he's going to be a memorable Blacklister."

Prior to the episode's release, James Spader expressed his hopes to Zap2it that the series would gain more viewers from the Super Bowl.

== Reception ==
Upon airing, the episode ranked as NBC's biggest overall audience for a scripted series in more than 10 years, with 26.5 million viewers. The Canadian broadcast received 1.37 million viewers, making it the fourth-highest-rated broadcast of the night and the twenty-second of the week.

Jodi Walker of Entertainment Weekly gave the episode a positive review, saying:

Rather than give us an interesting one-week character, we got a baddie to sink our teeth into with the likes of Ron Perlman and his mysterious Belgrade references, and rather than skirting around the lingering issues from November's midseason finale, the show went full-frontal Fulcrum. The only thing I might fault this midseason premiere for is feeling quite similar to last season's midseason return; but I don't need The Blacklist to reinvent the fedora every week, especially if it means Red Jack Bauer-ing his way through a secret floating prison in order to tell Lizzie that she's ... something.
