= The Blacklist season 2 =

Season of television series

The Blacklist
- Season 2
- Season 2 DVD cover
- No. of episodes: 22

Release
- Original network: NBC
- Original release: September 22, 2014 – May 14, 2015

Season chronology
- ← Previous; Season 1 Next → Season 3

The second season of the American crime thriller television series The Blacklist premiered on NBC on September 22, 2014, and concluded on May 14, 2015, and ran for 22 episodes. The season was produced by Davis Entertainment, Universal Television, and Sony Pictures Television, and the executive producers are Jon Bokenkamp, John Davis, John Eisendrath, John Fox, and Joe Carnahan.

== Premise ==
The second season follows Reddington's war with The Cabal, a shadowy multinational group that holds positions of influence in government and business, over The Fulcrum, a digital repository of information about The Cabal's illegal activities that both parties want. The season introduces Samar Navabi (Mozhan Marnò), a former agent of the Mossad and new member of the Task Force with a connection to Reddington. The first part of the season sees the resolution of Red's conflict with Milos Kirchoff, AKA Berlin. The second half of the season introduces a new series antagonist Peter Kotsiopulos (David Strathairn), the ruthless Director of the National Clandestine Service (AKA The Director) and a key member of The Cabal, who seeks possession of The Fulcrum at any cost. The season also follows Elizabeth Keen's investigation into Tom's double life and the subsequent breakup of their marriage. Liz ends up being tried over her involvement in a murder committed by Tom and the subsequent cover up. Ultimately Liz and Tom reconcile but Liz ends up on the run from the FBI and the Task Force after killing Tom Connolly (Reed Birney), the U. S. Attorney General and secret member of The Cabal.

== Cast ==
=== Main cast ===
- James Spader as Raymond "Red" Reddington
- Megan Boone as Elizabeth Keen
- Diego Klattenhoff as Donald Ressler
- Ryan Eggold as Tom Keen
- Harry Lennix as Harold Cooper
- Amir Arison as Aram Mojtabai
- Mozhan Marnò as Samar Navabi

=== Recurring cast ===
- Hisham Tawfiq as Dembe Zuma.
- Reed Birney as Thomas "Smiling Tommy" Connolly, Assistant Attorney General.
- Lance Henriksen as The Major, Tom Keen's former mentor and trainer.
- Adriane Lenox as Reven Wright, Deputy Attorney General
- Susan Blommaert as Mr. Kaplan, Reddington's personal "cleaner".
- Peter Stormare as Berlin, real name Milos Kirchoff, Reddington's nemesis in the first season.
- Alan Alda as Alan Fitch, Assistant Director of National Intelligence.
- Mary-Louise Parker as Naomi Hyland/Carla Reddington, Reddington's ex-wife.
- Scottie Thompson as Zoe D'Antonio, Berlin's daughter.
- Hal Ozsan as Ezra, a personal guard assigned to Elizabeth by Reddington.
- Ron Perlman as Luther Braxton, a high-profile international thief.
- David Strathairn as "The Director", the mysterious head of the National Clandestine Service (NCS).
- Janel Moloney as Kat Goodson, the liaison between the NCS and the FBI.
- Clark Middleton as Glen Carter, a DMV employee occasionally employed by Reddington to retrieve information.
- Chandler Williams as Elias, member of the Disenfranchised.
- David Patrick Kelly as Elias's right-hand man.
- Ned Van Zandt as Leonard Caul, a security expert and creator of the Fulcrum.
- Dikran Tulaine as Max, a skilled bomb maker and longtime acquaintance of Red's

== Episodes ==
No. overall	No. in season	Title	Blacklist guide	Directed by	Written by	Original release date	US viewers (millions)
23	1	"Lord Baltimore"	No. 104	Michael Watkins	Jon Bokenkamp & John Eisendrath	September 22, 2014	12.55
While continuing his battle with Berlin, Red receives intelligence from a Cameroonian warlord that a person named "Lord Baltimore", an information broker, hired a Bounty Hunter to kill him. Meanwhile, Liz goes through the process of annulling her marriage with Tom, and is unknowingly under surveillance by an unknown party. During the investigation behind Lord Baltimore, the Task Force questions Rowan Mills (Krysten Ritter), a supposed victim of Lord Baltimore. Further investigation into Mills reveals that she is actually Rowan's twin sister, Nora Mills, a covert operative who suffers from an engineered dissociative identity disorder, and is also revealed to be the actual Lord Baltimore. Red learns during his brief captivity by a Mossad agent, Samar Navabi (Mozhan Marnò), that Baltimore's intended target is his ex-wife, Naomi Hyland (special guest star Mary-Louise Parker). Liz attempts to evacuate Naomi, but her team is ambushed by a kidnapping group led by Mills. While Liz successfully captures Mills, Red attempts to rescue Naomi at a designated apartment only to find a locket instead. Red later receives a package with a cell phone provided by Berlin, and is taunted that Naomi would be sent to Red "piece by piece", making true to his word when Red finds one of her fingers in the package. Harold Cooper returns to his role as the Task Force's acting director after a visit from Reddington.
24	2	"Monarch Douglas Bank"	No. 112	Paul Edwards	Kristen Reidel & Amanda Kate Shuman & Daniel Knauf	September 29, 2014	10.51
The FBI is alerted to a robbery at the Monarch Douglas Bank in Warsaw, Poland, since its U.S. headquarters are under FBI jurisdiction. Although nothing seems to have been stolen, the FBI believes the records of criminal transactions must have been the robbers' target, though upon arrival they soon discover it was the kidnapping of employee Kaja Tomczak. Liz and Ressler locate Kaja, who reveals that all of the bank's transaction records are stored in her head via her photographic memory. A tactical team is sent out after them by the bank, whose leader works with Berlin, and after escaping, hear something about a bank account number from Kaja. Red arrives and dispatches Kaja to his plane, now in possession of Berlin's money. Meeting Berlin for the first time at a pier, Red blackmails him with his money in exchange for the safe return of Naomi. Liz later learns that Kaja has frozen the escrow accounts in which Berlin's money is parked, whose codes Red trades with Berlin for Naomi during a meeting he refuses to call off. The next day, Cooper meets Samar in a park to review her file on Reddington, facilitating her recruitment into the task force.
25	3	"Dr. James Covington"	No. 89	Karen Gaviola	Lukas Reiter & J. R. Orci	October 6, 2014	10.07
Dr. James Covington is a disgraced surgeon running an illegal organ transplant business to extort criminals. With the aid of a recruited Samar, the Task Force starts investigating one of Covington's recent victims, Paul Wyatt. The investigation into Wyatt leads the Task Force to a medical examiner who supplies Covington with recently harvested organs. With the aid of the medical examiner, Liz and Ressler attempt to tail a courier responsible for transporting a heart transplant, only for the courier to die during the pursuit. Liz and Ressler come across an underground hospital utilized by Covington, attempting to arrest him. Liz and Ressler delay their arrest after being persuaded by Covington to finish a surgery on a young boy. Meanwhile, Reddington meets with business contacts involved with international shipping in order to outmaneuver Berlin. One of the contacts, Niko, attempts to double-cross Reddington in order to serve under Berlin's employment. Unbeknownst to Niko, a double agent (Paul Reubens) secretly working for Reddington, exposes Niko during the course of an attempted betrayal, prompting Reddington to kill Niko. During the aftermath, Liz has a brief conversation with Samar about her mistrust. Samar validates Liz's claims, and is later warned that her recruitment is part of Reddington's machinations. Meanwhile, Reddington and Dembe drive to a remote cabin where Naomi is staying, only for Naomi to slap Reddington.
26	4	"Dr. Linus Creel"	No. 82	Michael Watkins	Mike Ostrowski	October 13, 2014	9.76
Reddington asks Naomi for information about Jennifer and makes preparations to relocate Naomi and her husband, Frank. After being rebuffed by Naomi, Reddington uses his double agent Mr. Vargas to steal a dog from Frank's mistress, and blackmails Frank into starting his life over with Naomi. Meanwhile, the Task Force is directed by Reddington into investigating a bank shooting in Reston. During the spike of apparent "random violent crimes", all of the listed suspects were civilians with no prior criminal records, having been manipulated to violently act out at their breaking point. Cooper directs the Task Force into investigating black operations budgets funding mind-control projects. Utilizing a code-breaker suggested by Samar, Reddington and Liz bring a heavily redacted report given by Senator Sheridan for decoding. The decoding of the documents leads the Task Force into identifying social psychologist Dr. Linus Creel (David Costabile). Creel had been engineering the violent acts in order to publish his research regarding genetic screening, going far enough to martyr himself. The Task Force apprehends a college student attempting to kill Creel, only for Liz to be held hostage by Creel. During the stand-off, a sniper in Reddington's employment kills Creel, having been revealed as Liz's motel neighbor in the previous episode. Liz heads to the remote cabin where Naomi is staying, and attempts to question her about her past with Reddington to no avail. Before leaving, Naomi reveals privately to Reddington that Jennifer left of her own accord. The episode ends in what appears to be an old warehouse with Liz contemplating a locked door with a ring of keys in her hand.
27	5	"The Front"	No. 74	Steven A. Adelson	Teleplay by : Jim Campolongo & Adam Sussman; Story by : Adam Sussman	October 20, 2014	9.34
Maddox Beck, an eco-terrorist, steals an ancient clay painting from his wife to map out the location of a dormant pneumonic plague virus. Beck successfully recovers the virus and weaponizes it to inoculate his followers and create a world-wide epidemic. The Task Force contains most of the followers, but Samar and Elizabeth are infected by one of them at Dulles International Airport. With Aram's help, Reddington learns Beck's location and steals a supply of synthesized vaccine, as well as a necklace and a key, before leaving Beck to commit suicide. The vaccine is delivered to the Task Force for distribution to infected agents and civilians. Meanwhile, Reddington, now knowing who is believed to be Zoe's (Scottie Thompson) whereabouts and identity, covertly watches her from a distance. Having failed to convince Reddington to remove the guard he assigned to her, Elizabeth pays a look-alike to distract the guard while she secretly visits a basement at an undisclosed location.
28	6	"The Mombasa Cartel"	No. 114	David Platt	Daniel Knauf	October 27, 2014	9.57
In the mid-1980s, a young African boy witnesses his family get massacred by a group of poachers before getting kidnapped by the same group in Sierra Leone. In present day Paris, a poacher is kidnapped and sedated. His skinned body is washes up at a remote location in Kamchatka, Russia. Reddington identifies the most powerful group of poachers as the Mombasa Cartel, responsible for a large number of poachings of endangered wildlife as well as attacks against rival poaching organizations. After getting a lead from Geoff Perl (Peter Fonda), a technology-based businessman, the Task Force arrests one of the Mombasa Cartel's business partners for further information to little effect. When attempted surveillance on the business partner has failed, a drug-addicted Ressler heads to a remote cabin in Sitka, Alaska after getting a lead from the Task Force, only for him to be held prisoner by a small family responsible for kidnapping and preserving the bodies of the poachers members. While Liz and Samar lead a Hostage Rescue Team to rescue Ressler and apprehend the suspects, Reddington confronts the mastermind, Geoff Perl, in a remote hotel. Reddington reveals that the young boy was Dembe and recovers the full list of the Mombasa Cartel members before killing the mastermind. During the aftermath, Reddington makes an interaction with Zoe, and it is revealed that Liz had held Tom prisoner in a remote cell for an undisclosed amount of time.
29	7	"The Scimitar"	No. 22	Karen Gaviola	J. R. Orci & Lukas Reiter	November 3, 2014	9.30
After Agent Navabi kills a top Iranian nuclear scientist on a Mossad mission in Dubai, the Iranian government plans retaliation by sending The Scimitar, an Iranian agent who is apparently responsible for the death of Navabi's brother, to kidnap American scientists involved in a nuclear weapons program. While the Task Force foils the kidnapping, Navabi, with the aid of Reddington interrogates the Scimitar by herself, and is told that her brother is also in league with him. Not believing the Scimitar's claims, Navabi executes him and allows his body to be found by the Task Force. Meanwhile, Liz uses the intel received from Tom to help Red get a meeting with Berlin. Kidnapping Zoe, he brings her to Berlin and reveals that she is actually his long-believed-dead daughter.
30	8	"The Decembrist"	No. 12	Michael Watkins	John Eisendrath & Jon Bokenkamp	November 10, 2014	9.75
Zoe reveals to Reddington that a man called The Decembrist was responsible for facilitating her disappearance during the 1991 Kursk bombing. The Task Force investigates the bombing and learns that the person to benefit the most was an ex-KGB agent who is currently a high-ranking Russian official. Reddington and Berlin head to Moscow to interrogate them and learn that Alan Fitch himself was the Decembrist. Meanwhile, Liz maintains her attempts to interrogate Tom for intelligence on Berlin, only to run into complications with a harbormaster killed by Tom. Reddington's attempts to warn Fitch fall on deaf ears, only for Berlin to kidnap Fitch. Left with no other option, Liz releases Tom from captivity after learning the address of Fitch's whereabouts. A Hostage Rescue Team extracts a bomb-laden Fitch to the Post Office while Reddington uses Zoe to make contact with Berlin in order to find a means of disarming the bomb. Fitch tells a bomb technician to stop working on the bomb after realizing that it cannot be disarmed. Fitch attempts to tell Reddington of a safe in St. Petersburg but only manages to give the combination number before the bomb's detonation. During the aftermath, Reddington sends Mr. Kaplan to erase evidence of the harbormaster's death. He also fatally shoots Berlin after the two share a bottle of vodka. Reddington facilitates Tom's disappearance and warns him to stay away from Liz. Tom assures Reddington that he kept their professional connections a secret from Liz during his captivity.
31	9	"Luther Braxton"	No. 21	Joe Carnahan	Teleplay by : Jon Bokenkamp & John Eisendrath; Story by : J. R. Orci & Lukas Reiter & John Eisendrath & Jon Bokenkamp	February 1, 2015	25.72
Reddington is apprehended in Hong Kong by military forces, who place him in a fortified U.S. prison in the middle of the Bering Sea. Reddington pays a $50,000 bribe for his release, since known criminal Luther Braxton (Ron Perlman) is attempting to eliminate him and obtain "The Fulcrum". Liz, Ressler and Samar are dispatched to extract Reddington but the latter two are captured by Braxton's men. Red confides in Liz that he's never had The Fulcrum, but the fact that many think he does has kept him alive. The NCS director (David Strathairn) meets with some members of Fitch's group to discuss the same thing, and they decide to kill Red. Liz and Reddington work with some of Reddington's inmate friends to move through the prison and locate Braxton. Back at the FBI headquarters, Cooper negotiates with the NCS over Reddington's whereabouts, and the director ends up ordering a missile strike on the prison. Liz and Reddington successfully capture Braxton, who goes on to reveal his knowledge of Reddington and Liz's history and the house fire. Reddington urges Liz to shoot Braxton, but the missiles hit the prison. NOTE: This episode premiered after Super Bowl XLIX, generating the highest number of views for a Blacklist episode.
32	10	"Luther Braxton Conclusion"	No. 21	Michael Watkins	Teleplay by : Mike Ostrowski & Jim Campolongo; Story by : Kristen Reidel & Vincent Angell	February 5, 2015	10.11
Following the missile blast at the prison, Reddington, Ressler and Samar escape safely. Braxton captures Liz, taking her to a hospital in Alaska to be tortured for information on the Fulcrum. Braxton kidnaps the child of one Dr. Selma Orchard (Gloria Reuben) to coerce her into performing a "memory recovery operation" on Liz while she is sedated. While Liz experiences multiple memory cycles, Reddington captures Braxton and arrives with the other agents to recover Liz. Liz has learned that Reddington was there at her home to recover the Fulcrum, and rescued her from the fire while her parents died in the chaos. She angrily tells Reddington that his fatherly concern for her is an act he needs to drop. Reddington later meets with the NCS director next to Braxton's hanged corpse, claiming to have custody of the Fulcrum. The director calls Reddington's bluff and states that he isn't afraid of Reddington. Dr. Orchard meets with Liz, telling her the events she recalled in the memory recovery are likely correct, but the roles of the people involved may not be. Later at her apartment, Liz goes through her personal effects and finds a strange device inside her childhood stuffed rabbit.
33	11	"Ruslan Denisov"	No. 67	Andrew McCarthy	Jonathan Shapiro & Lukas Reiter	February 12, 2015	8.19
Reddington, Liz and Ressler travel to Uzbekistan to investigate criminal Ruslan Denisov (Faran Tahir), who is holding multiple American hostages captive. Denisov, an old associate of Red's, is targeting members of a company that is refusing to replace a pipeline, whose leaking water is poisoning civilians. After unsuccessful attempts to negotiate with Denisov, Reddington works with him to capture a former Russian business associate (Olek Krupa) and use the company's history to blackmail them into repairing the pipeline. The CIA, however, have one of their agents in Denisov's custody and attempt to employ an Uzbek general (Shaun Toub) to eliminate Denisov. Cooper confronts the CIA handler and the mission is called off. Reddington captures the general and assures Denisov that he has helped his country, and despite potential consequences he will emerge a hero. Meanwhile, a Metro PD detective Wilcox begins investigating the murder of the harbormaster Tom killed in "The Decembrist". He finds the Samoan (the bodyguard hired by Liz to hold Tom captive) and begins investigating him. The Samoan leads him to the body and talks about Liz. Elsewhere, Liz asks Aram to determine the nature of the strange item she found in the stuffed rabbit. Aram later says he can only identify it as some kind of recording device.
34	12	"The Kenyon Family"	No. 71	David Platt	Vincent Angell & Daniel Knauf	February 19, 2015	7.71
Reddington and the FBI team investigate a family of polygamous cultist criminals known as "The Kenyon Family" which also doubles as a storage facility for military weapons, as a way of making their fortune to afford expensive lawyers to hold off the law. However, the cult is attacked by an unseen enemy, killing all of the members and stealing the weapons, while also kidnapping Justin Kenyon, the cult's leader, who they later kill. Afterwards, a series of vans, filled with explosives, appear near Washington D.C., being manned by children, which grants Liz and the task force a warrant to raid the Kenyon private property. Liz and Ressler are kidnapped by the same people who attacked the cult, who turn out to be boys that Justin had thrown into the wilderness because of his belief that there were too many boys, who have banded together under the leadership of David Keynon, Justin's son. Liz and Ressler are later saved by the FBI, who have managed to track them, resulting in the death of David. Cooper receives a job offer to become a director of the FBI, but turns it down because of health issues and focuses on trying to get in on a trial for his illness, which he is denied. Reddington teams up with a reluctant Glen (a DMV contact) to track down the contents of Alan Fitch's safe in St. Petersburg. The pair arrive to find a card with an unknown telephone number, which Red tries to trace to no avail. Returning to the Post Office, he surprises Liz with a key to her brand new apartment, which annoys her. Cooper finds out that he has been accepted as an 'extra' for the trial, thanks to his friend Thomas Connolly, who has powerful connections. After the Kenyon compound threat is neutralized by the FBI, Red goes back there to a secret bunker which houses what appears as an old 1960s-1970s Lincoln Continental Presidential vehicle perfectly preserved. Red opens the trunk and takes out a silver briefcase. Red then calls the telephone number, which is answered by a mysterious man.
35	13	"The Deer Hunter"	No. 93	Andrew McCarthy	Amanda Kate Shuman	February 26, 2015	8.01
The FBI team tracks down a serial killer nicknamed "The Deer Hunter", who has been on a killing spree for nearly twelve years. Detective Wilcox continues to question The Samoan about the harbormaster's murder, who agrees to testify if he gets immunity. The mysterious caller sets up a meeting with Reddington, telling him that they need to discuss something in person. Red then meets with Elizabeth and inquires about the Fulcrum, which she unsuccessfully lies about. They agree to a deal that he will help bring down The Deer Hunter in exchange for the Fulcurm. The Deer Hunter turns out to be the murdered husband of Tracy Solobotkin (Amanda Plummer), who is an employee in an organization that helps battered women. Kidnapping Liz, she reveals that she killed her husband in self-defense and decided to continue his legacy in the form of killing men who hurt other women. Liz manages to choke her into unconsciousness, just as Ressler and the task force arrive. Reddington finds out about The Samoan's deal with Wilcox and bribes him to lie to the District Attorney. As this falls on the same exact time as the intended meeting with the mystery caller, he sends Dembe instead, which angers the mystery caller who hangs up during the phone call. Red later manages to trace the Mystery man's location, but only finds the cell phone he was using and blood on the floor. He meets with Elizabeth to inform her of his deal with The Samoan, but she refuses to hand him The Fulcrum. Reddington calls her out for being afraid that he would lose all interest in her if she gave it to him.
36	14	"T. Earl King VI"	No. 94	Steven A. Adelson	Brandon Sonnier & Brandon Margolis	March 5, 2015	8.23
Reddington reveals the next blacklister to be the infamous King family, who, for 200 years, have been under the guise of being investors and businessmen; their real business, however, was running underground auctions where the products sold ranged from stolen paintings to high profile kidnapping victims. When they kidnap Reddington using Madeline Pratt as bait, Elizabeth uses the identity of a proxy from an infamous Russian art collector with an interest in stolen paintings, and infiltrates the auction to retrieve Reddington and shut down the Kings' business. Meanwhile, Tom realizes that he has been missing Elizabeth, and calls her before taking an undercover job in Germany as a neo-Nazi named Christof Mannheim.
37	15	"The Major"	No. 75	Michael Watkins	Jon Bokenkamp & John Eisendrath & Lukas Reiter	March 12, 2015	7.53
Liz is accused of the murder of the harbormaster killed by Liz's ex-husband Tom, so Reddington tasks a search party to find him. Meanwhile, Tom goes undercover in Germany. A Judge has to determine that there is sufficient evidence to proceed with a Grand Jury indictment as the Task Force works to quash the subpoena. Under oath, Liz tells Judge Denner (John Finn) in camera what has happened for the last year, but he does not believe her. Red determines that Deputy Minister Mamat Krishnan, who can connect Red to The Major, has to be abducted to ensure Elizabeth's freedom.
38	16	"Tom Keen"	No. 7	Andrew McCarthy	Teleplay by : Lukas Reiter & J. R. Orci; Story by : J. R. Orci & Lukas Reiter & Jon Bokenkamp & John Eisendrath	March 19, 2015	8.64
Following the last episode, Judge Denner finds that Liz was lying about the murder after police find the bullet that matched her gun and was used to shoot Samuel Alecko. In light of the evidence, the judge pushes forward an indictment for murder and perjury for Liz. In order to reach Tom, Reddington and Ressler sabotage an arms deal and kill Tom's assigned group, telling him to confess to his murder of the harbormaster. Meanwhile, Cooper, who confides to Liz about the perjury, has a seizure and is rushed to the hospital. Liz later finds out from Cooper's wife that he has a brain tumor and has at most a year to live. Tom comes to the courtroom and confesses to the murder, attempting to make a deal for Liz to be free from prosecution. However, Tom Connolly, in line to become the next Attorney General, intervenes, forcing the judge to drop the charges in exchange for avoiding arrest for exceeding his authority. Later, Tom Keen calls Liz and asks her if she is okay.
39	17	"The Longevity Initiative"	No. 97	Donald Thorin Jr.	Lukas Reiter & J. R. Orci	March 26, 2015	8.12
After a state trooper is shot and killed when he stops a truck revealed to have several experimented-on human corpses in it, Reddington reveals the next blacklister to be Roger Hobbs. Hobbs is a billionaire tech mogul whose fascination with immortality led him to develop and fund a research team for just that purpose. Leading the research is Dr. Julian Powell, a scientist who has been injecting the cells of an extremely unique jellyfish species into humans in order to hopefully force their cells to regenerate. While Liz and Reddington go after Powell, The Major decides Tom's love for Liz has clouded his judgment and made him a liability, and he plans to have Tom executed. Before this comes to fruition, however, the Germans that Tom had been trying to infiltrate now intervene and capture them both for interrogation. As both are being tortured, Tom says they will never talk. One of the Germans then pulls a photo of Liz out of Tom's wallet and threatens to harm her instead. But when Tom says Liz is FBI, the leader of the German group decides that attracting the attention of the FBI would be a greater risk than letting Tom go. Having nowhere to go, Tom heads to Liz's home.
40	18	"Vanessa Cruz"	No. 117	Guy Ferland	Vincent Angell & Daniel Knauf	April 2, 2015	7.70
Vanessa Cruz, a vengeful widow of a broker turned whistleblower, has been attacking businessmen by committing crimes and framing them for it under the guise of "corporate wrongdoing". Meanwhile, Reddington attempts to sow seeds of dissent within the Cabal's ranks in order to depose The Director. Tom asks Liz for help for recovering his passports, but is initially rebuffed. Running into an obstacle in the investigation of Cruz, Liz turns to Tom for help in finding Cruz in exchange for the return of his passports. While the Task Force manages to foil Cruz's initial assassination attempt, Cruz escapes, and is approached by Mr. Kaplan for recruitment into Reddington's fold. During the aftermath, Tom discloses to Liz the truth behind his relationship with Reddington. A disgusted Liz approaches Reddington with the fulcrum, attempting to cut her ties with him, only for an unknown sniper to wound Reddington.
41	19	"Leonard Caul"	No. 62	Michael Waxman	Brandon Margolis & Brandon Sonnier & Kristen Reidel & Jim Campolongo	April 23, 2015	7.47
Liz and Dembe spring into action to save a lung-shot Red and immediately take him to an enclosed location to treat him. Red regains consciousness and tells Liz to talk to Leonard Caul and might have an idea about the Fulcrum. Liz finds Caul and it is revealed that the Fulcrum is a collection of information regarding political assassinations and terrorism for which the Cabal is responsible. Liz narrowly stops the Director's assassination mission on Reddington by blackmailing him with the Fulcrum. In the aftermath, Tom Connolly ends up having a seat within the Director's Cabal, after having leaked information about Reddington's whereabouts to the Cabal. Liz, frustrated with Reddington's scheming which put Tom Keen in her life, asks Tom about what he knows about Reddington.
42	20	"Quon Zhang"	No. 87	Karen Gaviola	J. R. Orci & Lukas Reiter	April 30, 2015	6.60
After decoding the information embedded in the Fulcrum, Red is determined to stop the imminent threat. Meanwhile, the task force discovers that deceased bodies of Chinese-American women are being smuggled out of the country under false identities. Liz continues to search for answers about her past after discovering a picture hidden in Red's secret flat. After Elizabeth and Tom unsuccessfully interrogate former associates of Berlin, Elizabeth discovers that Red had already threatened them to keep them from telling. Elizabeth goes back to Red's flat, knowing that it was Red had been watching her and knew she would return. Ultimately, Red tells Elizabeth who's in the picture.
43	21	"Karakurt"	No. 55	Steven A. Adelson	Daniel Knauf	May 7, 2015	6.90
The task force investigates a Russian Blacklister code-named "Karakurt" who is recruited by the Cabal to start a new Cold War. Karakurt's plans are to bomb a defence facility and to assassinate an anti-Russian U.S. Senator with a viral weapon. In a race against time, Liz and Ressler failed to stop the bombing but they were successful in intercepting the Senator. However, the Senator died because the disease carrier turns out to be Liz. It was then revealed that Liz is being set up by the Cabal. Elsewhere, Tom tries to mend things with Liz.
44	22	"Tom Connolly" (Note: The episode was initially titled "Masha Rostova", before being renamed "Tom Connolly".)	No. 11	Michael Watkins	John Eisendrath & Jon Bokenkamp	May 14, 2015	7.49
Liz is framed for the assassination of a U.S. Senator and is now on the run with Red's help. The Attorney General, Tom Connolly, forces Cooper on administrative leave for keeping Keen from being questioned. Liz is captured for questioning, but later escapes with the help of Reddington and Cooper. Angered at Reddington for refusing to tell the truth about her mother, Liz seeks Tom's assistance, and the two eventually give in to their romantic feelings for each other. Meanwhile, Red brings together the world's leading investigative journalists and reveals the Fulcrum's contents to publicly expose the Cabal. Through Liz, Cooper discovers that his disease was a hoax orchestrated by the Cabal through Connolly, and angrily confronts him together with Liz. Connolly defensively threatens them both, which eventually causes Liz to fatally shoot him. The shooting triggers her memory of the night of the fire: she shot and killed her abusive father in order to protect her mother. Liz escapes police capture with Reddington's help, and confesses to having regained her memory, as well as her full understanding of Reddington's desire to protect her. They both escape, while Tom leaves in his boat. Reven Wright appoints Ressler as the new director of the task force, while Cooper hands in his badge and is questioned for Connolly's murder. Liz's name is put next to Reddington's on the FBI Ten Most Wanted list.

== Reception ==
The second season of The Blacklist received positive reviews from critics. The review aggregator website Rotten Tomatoes reports an 83% approval score based on 18 reviews, with an average rating of 7.8/10. The consensus reads: "Though The Blacklist flirts with narrative overload, it's held together by James Spader's scenery-eating performance and wildly entertaining action".

=== Ratings ===
No.	Title	Air date	Time slot (EST)	Ratings/Share (18–49)	Viewers (millions)	Viewers Rank (Week)	DVR 18–49	DVR Viewers (millions)	Total 18–49	Total viewers (millions)
1	"Lord Baltimore (No. 104)"	September 22, 2014	Mondays; 10:00 pm	3.5/10	12.55	14	2.0	6.782	5.5	19.334
2	"Monarch Douglas Bank (No. 112)"	September 29, 2014	Mondays; 10:00 pm	2.8/8	10.51	22	1.9	5.997	4.7	16.527
3	"Dr. James Covington (No. 89)"	October 6, 2014	Mondays; 10:00 pm	2.6/8	10.07	19	2.1	6.470	4.7	16.537
4	"Dr. Linus Creel (No. 82)"	October 13, 2014	Mondays; 10:00 pm	2.8/8	9.76	21	1.8	6.191	4.6	15.949
5	"The Front (No. 74)"	October 20, 2014	Mondays; 10:00 pm	2.4/7	9.34	25	2.0	6.034	4.4	15.372
6	"The Mombasa Cartel (No. 114)"	October 27, 2014	Mondays; 10:00 pm	2.5/7	9.57	21	1.9	6.144	4.4	15.711
7	"The Scimitar (No. 22)"	November 3, 2014	Mondays; 10:00 pm	2.4/7	9.30	20	1.9	6.281	4.3	15.581
8	"The Decembrist (No. 12)"	November 10, 2014	Mondays; 10:00 pm	2.5/8	9.75	21	2.0	6.208	4.5	15.961
9	"Luther Braxton (No. 21)"	February 1, 2015	Sunday; 10:38 pm	8.4/23	25.72	3	1.5	4.765	9.9	30.489
10	"Luther Braxton (No. 21) Conclusion"	February 5, 2015	Thursdays; 9:00 pm	2.4/7	10.11	10	1.6	5.067	4.0	15.178
11	"Ruslan Denisov (No. 67)"	February 12, 2015	Thursdays; 9:00 pm	1.7/5	8.19	26	1.9	5.995	3.6	14.187
12	"The Kenyon Family (No. 71)"	February 19, 2015	Thursdays; 9:00 pm	1.7/5	7.71	28	1.8	5.833	3.5	13.546
13	"The Deer Hunter (No. 93)"	February 26, 2015	Thursdays; 9:00 pm	1.9/6	8.01	25	1.7	5.695	3.6	13.705
14	"T. Earl King VI (No. 94)"	March 5, 2015	Thursdays; 9:00 pm	1.8/5	8.23	27	1.7	5.329	3.5	13.562
15	"The Major (No. 75)"	March 12, 2015	Thursdays; 9:00 pm	1.8/5	7.63	30	1.6	5.328	3.4	12.856
16	"Tom Keen (No. 7)"	March 19, 2015	Thursdays; 9:00 pm	1.8/5	8.64	12	1.7	5.356	3.5	13.992
17	"The Longevity Initiative (No. 97)"	March 26, 2015	Thursdays; 9:00 pm	1.6/5	8.12	18	1.6	5.245	3.2	13.367
18	"Vanessa Cruz (No. 117)"	April 2, 2015	Thursdays; 9:00 pm	1.6/5	7.70	22	1.7	5.573	3.3	13.252
19	"Leonard Caul (No. 62)"	April 23, 2015	Thursdays; 9:00 pm	1.5/4	7.47	31	1.5	4.808	3.0	12.273
20	"Quon Zhang (No. 87)"	April 30, 2015	Thursdays; 9:00 pm	1.2/4	6.60	33	1.7	4.966	2.9	11.565
21	"Karakurt (No. 55)"	May 7, 2015	Thursdays; 9:00 pm	1.4/5	6.90	29	1.5	4.720	2.9	11.623
22	"Tom Connolly (No. 11)"	May 14, 2015	Thursdays; 9:00 pm	1.6/5	7.49	22	1.3	4.594	2.9	12.086
