= The Blacklist season 3 =

The Blacklist
- Season 3
- Season 3 DVD cover
- No. of episodes: 23

Release
- Original network: NBC
- Original release: October 1, 2015 – May 19, 2016

Season chronology
- ← Previous; Season 2 Next → Season 4

The third season of the American crime thriller television series The Blacklist premiered on NBC on October 1, 2015, and concluded on May 19, 2016. The season consisted of 23 episodes. The season was produced by Davis Entertainment, Universal Television, and Sony Pictures Television, and the executive producers were Jon Bokenkamp, John Davis, John Eisendrath, John Fox, and Joe Carnahan.

== Premise ==
The third season sees Liz and Reddington on the run from the government and the Task Force. The first part of the season explores The Cabal's efforts to capture Liz and Reddington and their efforts to clear Liz's name. The Cabal is represented by the ruthless Director of the CIA's National Clandestine Service Peter Kotsiopulos (David Strathairn). The season also introduces private intelligence contractor Susan "Scottie" Hargrave (Famke Janssen), the mother of secret agent Tom Keen, mercenary Mattias Solomon (Edi Gathegi) and ex-United States Navy officer Nez Rowan (Tawny Cypress), key characters for the spin-off series The Blacklist: Redemption, focusing on Tom and Scottie Hargrave. The final episodes of the season also introduce a new series antagonist Alexander Kirk, AKA Konstantin Rostov, a businessman with aplastic anaemia, who claims to be Liz's father and will stop at nothing to protect her and win her loyalty. An important subplot for the season is Liz's pregnancy and Reddington's cleaner Mr. Kaplan's (Susan Blommaert) efforts to protect Liz and Tom's daughter from Reddington.

== Cast ==
=== Main ===
- James Spader as Raymond Reddington
- Megan Boone as Elizabeth Keen
- Diego Klattenhoff as Donald Ressler
- Ryan Eggold as Tom Keen
- Harry Lennix as Harold Cooper
- Amir Arison as Aram Mojtabai
- Mozhan Marnò as Samar Navabi
- Hisham Tawfiq as Dembe Zuma

=== Recurring ===
- Susan Blommaert as Mr. Kaplan.
- Deirdre Lovejoy as Cynthia Panabaker.
- David Strathairn as Peter Kotsiopulos, the Director of the National Clandestine Service.
- Edi Gathegi as Matias Solomon, a Cabal operative sent to hunt down Reddington.
- Adriane Lenox as Deputy Attorney General Reven Wright, the Department of Justice liaison to the Task Force.
- Christine Lahti as Laurel Hitchin, National Security Advisor and chairman of the commission tasked with investigating the OREA bombing.
- Margarita Levieva as Gina Zanetakos, a corporate terrorist turned master criminal who recruits Tom for a heist.
- Andrew Divoff as Karakurt, a Russian assassin responsible for the OREA bombing and killing of Senator Hawkins.
- Fisher Stevens as Marvin Gerard, Reddington's lawyer.
- Peter Vack as Asher Sutton, a socialite whom Tom Keen exploits to track Karakurt.
- Paul Reubens as Mr. Vargas, Reddington's double agent.
- Tony Plana as Mr. Diaz, the Venezuelan Foreign Minister whom Reddington asks for help.
- Conor Leslie as Gwen Hollander, Asher Sutton's girlfriend.
- Clark Middleton as Glen Carter, a DMV employee occasionally employed by Reddington.
- Ned van Zandt as Leonard Caul, an operative of Reddington's and an expert on computer security.
- Tawny Cypress as Nez Rowan, a mercenary.
- Famke Janssen as Susan "Scottie" Hargrave and the mother of Tom Keen.
- Ulrich Thomsen as Alexander Kirk/Konstantin Rostov, the man claiming to be Liz's father.
- Benito Martinez as Senator Robert Diaz, a presidential candidate being supported by Alexander Kirk.
- Murphy Guyer as The Eye in the Sky.
- Piter Marek as Nik, Liz's former boyfriend and Reddington's emergency doctor.
- Raoul Trujillo as Mato, a hitman employed by Alexander Kirk.

== Episodes ==
No. overall	No. in season	Title	Blacklist guide	Directed by	Written by	Original release date	US viewers (millions)
45	1	"The Troll Farmer"	No. 38	Michael Watkins	Jon Bokenkamp & John Eisendrath	October 1, 2015	7.76
With Liz and Reddington on the run, Red reaches out to his contacts to help flee the city. However his contact known as the Troll Farmer is unable to help them for another week, which results in Red and Liz hiding at a bar that houses a secret compartment beneath. Ressler interrogates Cooper about Liz's last known whereabouts and does everything to find them as the new Director of the task force. Tipped off about Red and Liz's location, Ressler attempts to capture them but fails. Forcing the Troll Farmer to help them ahead of time, Red manages to escape the city, but Liz gets separated from him and is forced to go to the Russian Embassy, claiming to be a spy for the FSB. Meanwhile, an associate of the NCS Director, Mr. Solomon, kidnaps Dembe's infant granddaughter to attract his attention, blackmailing him to inhale an unspecified drug in exchange for her life, which renders him unconscious.
46	2	"Marvin Gerard"	No. 80	Andrew McCarthy	Story by : J. R. Orci & Lukas Reiter; Teleplay by : Daniel Knauf & Brandon Sonnier & Brandon Margolis	October 8, 2015	7.02
After Liz turns herself in to the Russian Embassy, the Cabal uses this opportunity as a means to kill her. Red warns Ressler of Liz's impending doom and has him stop that convoy, which gives Liz a chance to escape. Liz and Red reunite at a diner which later turns into an improvised hostage situation when Ressler and his team show up. Red demands the release of fellow Blacklister Marvin Gerard (Fisher Stevens) a former top defense lawyer, whose help Red wants to formulate a plan to take down the Cabal. The hostage situation is later revealed to be a jailbreak for Gerard, as the diner turns out to be a smuggling location, which allows them to flee the scene. Elsewhere, Cooper is forced to take a leave of absence while his involvement in Connolly's assassination is being reviewed. Meanwhile, Dembe is tortured for information by Solomon on Red's whereabouts and Tom reappears to Ressler, offering help. Red and Liz escape in a shipping container on a cargo ship.
47	3	"Eli Matchett"	No. 72	Steven A. Adelson	Lukas Reiter & J. R. Orci	October 15, 2015	6.93
On the run in Iowa, Red and Liz seek to gain leverage over the Cabal by thwarting the plans of an agribusiness firm that launders money for it. The firm has hired Eli Matchett, who leads a group of eco-terrorists that target corporate farming companies. He has developed a virus to kill the crops grown from the company's seeds, which Red warns the Task Force about as it could lead to a global food crisis. Meanwhile, Cooper turns to Tom for help. Dembe resists physical torture during his interrogation, causing Solomon to bring in Mr. Vargas as another one of his prisoners in an attempt to get the information he wants.
48	4	"The Djinn"	No. 43	Omar Madha	Daniel Cerone	October 22, 2015	6.68
Red and Liz continue their quest into clearing Liz's name, seeking help from the task force into catching Blacklister named "The Djinn", a criminal who helps fulfill revenge fantasies and who could lead them to the Cabal. Tom accepts Cooper's undercover assignment to pursue Karakurt, and looks to infiltrate a crime ring that may be protecting Karakurt from the Cabal, as he is considered a loose end. Meanwhile, Dembe successfully escapes, but is betrayed and shot by Mr. Vargas, revealed to be a double-agent, after the latter learns how to locate Red.
49	5	"Arioch Cain"	No. 50	Alex Zakrzewski	Dawn DeNoon	October 29, 2015	7.03
After an attempt on Liz's life, she and Red search for a blacklister named Arioch Cain, who has placed a bounty on Liz to avenge the murders committed by the Cabal that the media believes to have been committed by Liz. Meanwhile, Ressler testifies before a Presidential commission about the Cabal's attack, after which Laurel Hitchin, the National Security Advisor, orders the FBI task force to partner with the Director, Peter Kotsiopulous, (David Strathairn) and the CIA. Tom continues his undercover mission for Cooper, befriending Asher Sutton, a rich socialite being extorted by the Russian gangsters protecting Karakurt, and ends up killing one of his thugs. Red and Liz are betrayed by Mr. Vargas and handed over to Solomon. As Solomon proceeds to kill Liz in front of Red, a still-alive but wounded Dembe arrives and kills Solomon's henchmen. Red kills Mr. Vargas, while Solomon manages to escape. Red then stages Liz's death to draw out the real identity of the person that placed the bounty, learning that Arioch Cain is the daughter of a CIA agent killed in the OREA bombing.
50	6	"Sir Crispin Crandall"	No. 86	Ami Canaan Mann	Dave Thomas	November 5, 2015	6.44
Ressler adjusts to working with the Director, who has forced the FBI to cooperate with the CIA in tracking Red and Keen. The two fugitives learn that a financial advisor with connections to the Director has gone missing, which leads them to Sir Crispin Crandall (Harris Yulin), a reclusive billionaire who has kidnapped and cryogenically frozen some of the smartest people in the world in a bid to save the human race from a supposed mass extinction. They track Crandall to his lab, a perpetually airborne plane that Red forces to land, and Red shoots Crandall before taking the advisor's thumbs to open a safe-deposit box, which contains money that the Director had been stealing from the Cabal as an escape plan. Tom ends up in a fight club in order to find and capture Karakurt. He kills Asher after being forced to fight him to the death, but succeeds in finding Karakurt and drags him back to DC to exonerate Liz.
51	7	"Zal Bin Hasaan"	No. 31	Michael Watkins	Brandon Sonnier & Brandon Margolis	November 12, 2015	6.75
The task force look for a Blacklister named Zal Bin Hasaan, an Iranian terrorist responsible for the murder of numerous Mossad agents, including those Samar worked with, and the capture of several scientists working on Israel's missile defense system. In doing so, Samar is reunited with her brother Shahin (Sammy Sheik), thought to have been killed in a bombing years ago. It turns out that her brother is Zal, and in the end, she gives Shahin to Red to provide him with the leverage he needs to set up an important meeting with representatives of a Latin American government. Meanwhile, Tom delivers Karakurt to Cooper, and, after saving him from a suicide attempt, they force Karakurt to agree to confess to framing Liz on the Cabal's behalf. Ressler becomes upset that Cooper went behind his back to work with Tom. After an emotional day, Ressler and Samar end up sleeping together.
52	8	"Kings of the Highway"	No. 108	Terrence O'Hara	Brian Studler	November 19, 2015	6.91
While waiting for Dembe to retrieve an important item for their plan to clear Liz, Red is kidnapped by the "Kings of the Highway", a road gang that aims to steal money and possessions from unsuspecting travelers. Stranded by Red's abduction, Liz calls Samar to locate him, but Ressler fires her from the task force after he finds out she used his laptop to track him. Liz tracks the gang down by taking one of their members hostage to trade for Red. The exchange, which also involves trading the item Dembe had retrieved, is interrupted by the FBI, and Ressler arrests Liz after a lengthy chase, while Red escapes. Cooper and Tom find themselves being pursued by Solomon's men, and must protect Karakurt from being killed. The hunt for information on Solomon's past takes Reven Wright to Hitchin, who helped Solomon when he worked for the CIA. Hitchin then kills Wright to cover up her involvement with Solomon and the Cabal.
53	9	"The Director"	No. 24	Mary Lambert	Daniel Cerone	January 7, 2016	7.52
Ressler puts Liz in the box at the post office to protect her until the U.S. Marshals can transport her to her arraignment. The Director and Hitchin, hoping to prevent her from testifying, arrange to remove Liz from the box before the Marshals arrive and kill her in a staged escape attempt. Aram, determined to protect Liz from the Director, changes the door code to the box to keep the Director from taking Liz. The Director resorts to flooding the box with nitrogen, suffocating Liz, to force Aram to give up the door code. Meanwhile, Tom and Cooper take Karakurt to an empty cabin belonging to a neighbor with whom Cooper's wife Charlene was having an affair. With Ressler's help, they fend off an assault by Solomon and his men, who have tracked them to the cabin, and arrest Solomon in the process. Ressler returns to the post office quickly enough to prevent the Director from taking Liz by handing her over to Marshals under the command of Cynthia Panabaker, the White House Counsel. He also warns Hitchin that he knows that she killed Wright. Red and Samar manage to retrieve the case the FBI took. The case, containing state-of-the-art printing plates for money, created from the software upgrades General Ludd stole from the U.S. Treasury, is Red's leverage to get the Venezuelan government to agree to help him and Liz take down the Cabal.
54	10	"The Director: Conclusion"	No. 24	John Terlesky	Lukas Reiter	January 14, 2016	7.47
Red secretly meets with the task force to initiate the final phase of his plan while Ressler brings Liz to the federal courthouse and protects her there. Through an elaborate ruse, Red and the task force kidnap the Director and bring him to Venezuela's foreign minister, who intends to have the Director brought before The Hague on war crimes charges. Using the prospect of an American official being tried for war crimes as leverage, Red strikes a deal with Hitchin through Marvin Gerard. Thanks to Tom safely delivering Karakurt to the federal courthouse to confess to the OREA bombing and the Senator's murder, Gerard is able to get the U.S. government to drop all the charges against Liz except an involuntary manslaughter charge from the killing of Attorney General Tom Connolly. The plea deal prevents Liz from going to jail but also prevents her from returning to the FBI, unless as an asset to the task force. Hitchin issues a public apology to Liz, and also reveals both the existence of the Cabal and Connolly and the Director's involvement in it. With Liz finally set free, Ressler hands Cooper his old post as head of the task force. At Hitchin's request, Red kills the Director to rid the Cabal of a liability. Red and Hitchin meet afterwards to discuss involving him in the Cabal. Liz exits the courthouse and sees Red waiting for her, and they embrace.
55	11	"Mr. Gregory Devry"	No. 95	Alex Zakrzewski	Daniel Knauf	January 21, 2016	7.42
Liz, though exonerated, finds adjusting to normal life difficult without being an FBI agent. She is stripped of her concealed carry permit, has difficulties finding a new apartment and passers-by look at her with suspicion. Meanwhile, Marcus Caligiuri, an international criminal, kills Mr. Kaplan's team of cleaners as a warning to Red that he knows about his connection to the FBI, endangering his criminal empire. In response, Red has the task force look into a gathering of criminals which includes Caligiuri, and their hunt leads them to a man (Jake Weber) who claims to be the real Raymond Reddington. In the box at the post office, the impostor warns the task force that Caligiuri plans to kidnap an FBI executive to expose Red as an informant. The kidnapping succeeds, which forces the task force to offer the impostor immunity in exchange for infiltrating the criminal gathering. The real Red, however, joins the meeting first, and the late-arriving impostor is then falsely presented as the FBI asset hired by Caligiuri to betray the gathering of criminals. Both are then killed by Red, restoring his reputation among his fellow criminals. Beyond suspicion once again, Red tells Liz the impostor was his friend, Gregory Devry, a con man who was dying of cancer and who sacrificed himself to help Red. Meanwhile, Tom proposes to Liz again, a prospect that Red explicitly forbids. Liz is assaulted in the street, and during her recovery in the hospital, she finds out that she is pregnant.
56	12	"The Vehm"	No. 132	Michael Watkins	Vincent Angell	January 28, 2016	7.16
Tensions within the post office begin to endanger the relationships within the task force, as Cooper is sleeping in his office after separating from Charlene, and Ressler and Navabi are partnered together on their next case. A series of grisly murders, including the murder of one of Red's associates, prompts the task force to track down the Vehm, a group of religious fanatics who hunt and kill pedophiles. Red, not convinced that his associate was a pedophile, suspects that someone involved in money laundering is manipulating the Vehm into eliminating the competition. The investigation leads Red to a priest who has been using the Vehm to target money launderers under the pretense of murdering pedophiles. Red then turns the Vehm on the priest by convincing them they were tricked. The priest is killed, and the Vehm become allied with Red. Meanwhile, Liz ponders whether to keep the baby she is about to have, or put the baby up for adoption. Red tracks down Liz's assailant and promptly kills him. Tom is eager to start a new life with Liz, but his plans to take Liz with him are sabotaged when Red interferes by cutting off his career opportunities and placing Liz under his protection and surveillance.
57	13	"Alistair Pitt"	No. 103	Bill Roe	Story by : Nicole Phillips & Adam Sussman; Teleplay by : Nicole Phillips	February 4, 2016	6.49
The task force pursues Alistair Pitt (Tony Shalhoub), known as the Promnestria, which brokers arrangements between criminal empires for a cut of the profit. Pitt is brokering a merger between two warring crime families by arranging a marriage between their children. The groom-to-be is already engaged, so Pitt has his fiancee killed and blames it on the other family. To stop the violence, the daughter of the head of one of the mafia families, Alicia Vacarro (Allison Strong), agrees to marry the son of her father's rival. Red infiltrates the wedding party to stop it by exposing the truth about the fiancee's murder, forcing Pitt to reveal himself before the FBI swoops in. They arrest everyone except Pitt, who is taken by Red to France, where years ago, Pitt arranged a similar marriage between Josephine, a woman Red loved, and a man who eventually beat her into a catatonic state. Red kills Pitt and then tells Josephine, now in a wheelchair, that "its done". Meanwhile, Tom, seeking money to take Liz away from Red, seeks out former associate Gina Zanetakos, who brings him in on an elaborate but lucrative jewelry heist. Liz works with an adoption agency for her baby, but while a couple has agreed to take the baby, they insist on a closed adoption that would prevent Liz from seeing her child. Samar has to handle the news that Levi, her former Mossad partner and ex-lover, is engaged to someone else.
58	14	"Lady Ambrosia"	No. 77	Tim Hunter	Taylor Martin	February 11, 2016	6.43
Red brings Liz a case involving a series of abductions of children who have special needs. One of the abducted children is found, leading the task force to investigate the child's parents and an employee of an adoption agency who takes children unwanted by one of their parents to Lady Ambrosia (Celia Weston). In turn, Lady Ambrosia and her son, who also has special needs, take care of the children and, when they turn twelve, euthanize them in a magical spectacle for the other children as a way of "keeping them young and beautiful forever". Red abducts their accomplice from the adoption agency and tortures him to reveal the location of Lady Ambrosia's school of children. He takes one of the girls and leaves Lady Ambrosia to be killed by her son (who was made to believe by his mother that he was the cause of his brother's death), before he commits suicide. The other children are taken to safety by the task force. The girl Red rescued is returned to her mother, who returns the favor by giving him a file with information on "Rostova". Liz finally finds a couple who will take her child in an open adoption but needs Tom's consent to complete the adoption. Unbeknownst to Liz, Tom is betrayed by Gina, who has him shot and left for dead. He survives long enough to be found and taken to a hospital.
59	15	"Drexel"	No. 113	Anton Cropper	Dave Metzger	February 18, 2016	6.02
Drexel is a serial killer whose murders double as performance art, and his latest murder of a co-founder of a start-up financial firm is investigated by the task force. The murder is posted by an underground publication before the police investigate, and the task force concludes that Drexel has been using stolen NSA technology to hack into personal computers and access their webcams. The task force discover that the murder was meant to lead them to an illegal business that sold access to webcam feeds of unsuspecting people. Red uses the investigation to track down Drexel, who, according to the file he received, has been working on a painting seemingly commissioned by Katarina Rostova, Liz's birth mother, that depicts Liz standing over his grave. Liz finds Tom recovering in the hospital thanks to Nik, a doctor and Liz's ex-boyfriend, now under Red's employ after taking his money for saving his life. With his and Red's help, Tom escapes the police's investigation of the jewelry heist he participated in. The entire ordeal leads Liz to change her mind about giving her child up for adoption.
60	16	"The Caretaker"	No. 78	Don Thorin, Jr.	Dave Thomas	February 25, 2016	5.97
A US state government official is killed by the Chinese as retaliation for the murder of a Chinese official, the evidence to which was protected by The Caretaker (Reg E. Cathey), an underworld secret keeper. Red then introduces Keen to this case while, simultaneously, Tom confronts Gina on the intent of peace which leads to a fight between the two. Red provides the location of The Caretaker to Ressler and Navabi who hunt down The Caretaker. Upon interrogation, he says that he was releasing the secrets he possessed because a group of people had abducted his daughter Rose. They have demanded a second secret be released, which involves a cover up committed by the German government. The resulting exposure angers the Germans, who refuse to cooperate when it is discovered that a terrorist group they were tracking has entered the US and has seized a metric ton of C-4. The Task Force manages to stop both the terrorists and rescue Rose, who had staged her own abduction in order to get away from The Caretaker, who kidnapped her when she was a baby. Meanwhile, a deceased KGB agent Liz previously sought out parts with her information that her mother had staged her death. However, Red later burns a piece of information that he recovered by using The Caretaker's ledger that potentially would have proven Keen's current knowledge about her mother to be incorrect.
61	17	"Mr. Solomon"	No. 32	Eagle Egilsson	Brian Studler	April 7, 2016	6.42
Just as he is about to be executed by agents of the Cabal, Mr. Solomon is broken out of federal custody by an unknown patron. Liz and Tom decide to get married immediately, despite Red's objections. Liz asks Cooper to officiate at the wedding and invites the other members of the task force to attend. Gina and the Major prepare to kill Tom, but at the last minute Gina kills the Major instead and leaves. Tom confesses what happened to Liz, fearing she will change her mind about marrying him, but she reaffirms her love for him. The task force learns that Solomon is attempting to steal a tactical nuclear weapon. They capture one of Solomon's accomplices, Nez Rowan, who tips them off about his plans, but it turns out to be a dead end. Red realizes that Rowan allowed herself to be captured and the plot to steal the nuclear weapon was intended to divert the FBI's attention from Solomon's real target: Liz. He arrives at the church where Liz and Tom are about to be married just before Solomon surrounds it with his men and demands that Liz come out. A massive firefight breaks out, with Red, Dembe, Tom, Cooper, Ressler and Samar holding off Solomon's men as Liz and Tom escape.
62	18	"Mr. Solomon: Conclusion"	No. 32	John Terlesky	Daniel Cerone	April 14, 2016	6.74
Solomon continues his relentless pursuit of Liz and Tom, using satellite and data surveillance to track them. Liz is injured in a car accident. Mr. Kaplan takes her to a secure location where Nik performs an emergency Caesarian section to save her baby. Mr. Kaplan rebukes Red for endangering Liz and her baby. The C-section is successful, but Liz refuses to let Red see her child, whom she names Agnes after her adoptive grandmother. Shortly afterward, Liz has a life-threatening post-birth complication. Just before Nik puts Liz into a medically induced coma, she forgives Red. Red has Liz taken to a hospital, sending out an empty ambulance as a decoy, but Solomon's men still find and stop the real ambulance with Liz inside. The FBI arrives and kills Solomon's men, but Solomon escapes. Ressler finds that Liz has died despite Nik and Red's efforts. The task force grieves, and a devastated Red goes to see Tom and Agnes.
63	19	"Cape May"	None	Michael Watkins	Daniel Knauf	April 21, 2016	7.02
A distraught and broken Red travels to Cape May, New Jersey, where he saves a woman (Lotte Verbeek) from drowning herself, developing a connection with her. Red tells her his feelings about Liz, her death, and the future of her child. Later on, she reveals that there are people after her to kill her. She and Red team up to take them down. Afterwards, she again tries to drown herself and Red is unable to save her this time. However, it is then revealed that Red had been hallucinating the entire ordeal and that the woman was actually a ghost existing within his memories, that of Katarina Rostova.
64	20	"The Artax Network"	No. 41	Don Thorin, Jr.	Dawn DeNoon	April 28, 2016	6.70
The task force mourn Liz's death and seek revenge on her killers, even though Cooper has been ordered to stand down and focus on finding Red. They discover Solomon's employers were using a defunct satellite network, the Artax Network, to track Liz at every step. The investigation uncovers Panabaker meeting an unidentified woman (Famke Janssen) who may be the mastermind behind Liz's death. Meanwhile, Red is in hiding, trying to make amends with Liz's maternal grandfather, Dom (Brian Dennehy). Eventually, at the urging of Dom and Aram, who tracked him down, he returns to the task force, ready to help find Liz's killers.
65	21	"Susan Hargrave"	No. 18	Andrew McCarthy	Story by : J. R. Orci & Lukas Reiter; Teleplay by : Vincent Angell & Daniel Cerone & Brian Studler	May 5, 2016	6.65
Red tells the task force that a powerful woman named Susan "Scottie" Hargrave was paid to kidnap Liz. Scottie is the head of a private military firm that contracts extensively with the US government on black ops. After being drawn out and wounded, Scottie reveals to Red that the person who hired her and is responsible for Liz's death is a man named Alexander Kirk. Now having a common enemy, Red and Scottie agree that they will work together to take him down.
66	22	"Alexander Kirk"	No. 14	Michael Dinner	Story by : Jon Bokenkamp & John Eisendrath & J. R. Orci & Lukas Reiter; Teleplay by : Jon Bokenkamp & John Eisendrath	May 12, 2016	6.62
Red informs the task force to search for Alexander Kirk, a Russian oligarch the man responsible for the death of Elizabeth Keen who is after Agnes and Tom. To draw Kirk out, the team reluctantly co-operates with Solomon and his crew to steal hundreds of millions of dollars from a campaign account that Kirk established to support Senator Robert Diaz (Benito Martinez) for President. Everything runs smoothly until Solomon makes a remark about Liz, causing Tom to shoot him, although he escapes soon after. Despite this hurdle, the heist is successful. After the team splits paths, Tom returns to the hospital only to find Agnes missing. He meets with Scottie with the intention of killing her, but finds that she moved Agnes to save her from Kirk. Tom also discovers that Scottie is his mother, but Red tells Tom that she doesn't know Tom is her son, believing him to be dead.
67	23	"Alexander Kirk: Conclusion"	No. 14	Bill Roe	Lukas Reiter & J. R. Orci	May 19, 2016	6.88
The task force is closing in on Kirk, having blackmailed Diaz into putting pressure on Kirk to come out of hiding after Red frames one of his companies for financing terrorism. Meanwhile, Red reveals that he wants to leave the task force following Liz's death because he has no use left for them. Mr. Kaplan keeps an eye on Tom and Agnes as Kirk's men track them. Tom eludes his security detail and flees to a villa in Cuba with his daughter to go into hiding. When Red discovers this, he learns that Mr. Kaplan helped Tom flee the country, which makes Red furious, as Kirk has also tracked Tom and Agnes to Cuba. Mr. Kaplan reveals to Red that Liz is actually alive. She says she arranged to fake Liz's death in order to protect Agnes from Red, noting that Red ultimately failed to protect Liz. Red travels to Cuba only to find the empty villa and signs of a struggle. A captive Liz is met by Kirk, who reveals his real name to be Konstantin Rostov, Katarina's husband and her birth father.

== Production ==
Hisham Tawfiq, who plays Red's body man, Dembe Zuma, was promoted to series regular beginning with Season 3.

=== Spin-off ===
Episode 22 was written by Bokenkamp and Eisendrath and directed by Michael Dinner as a potential spin-off of the series. That spin-off, titled The Blacklist: Redemption, was announced shortly after the airing of Episode 22, and was aired on NBC from February to April 2017 before it was cancelled with only 8 episodes due to low ratings.

== Reception ==
The third season of The Blacklist received positive reviews from critics. The review aggregator website Rotten Tomatoes reports a 93% approval score based on 14 reviews, with an average rating of 7.4/10. The consensus reads: "The Blacklist is back in top form with fresh dangers that put Red on the ropes while giving James Spader room to shine".

=== Ratings ===
No.	Title	Air date	Time slot (EST)	Ratings/Share (18–49)	Viewers (millions)	DVR 18–49	DVR Viewers (millions)	Total 18–49	Total viewers (millions)
1	"The Troll Farmer (No. 38)"	October 1, 2015	Thursdays; 9:00 pm	1.8/6	7.76	1.7	5.479	3.5	13.244
2	"Marvin Gerard (No. 80)"	October 8, 2015	Thursdays; 9:00 pm	1.5/5	7.02	1.5	4.892	3.0	11.911
3	"Eli Matchett (No. 72)"	October 15, 2015	Thursdays; 9:00 pm	1.4/4	6.93	1.6	5.049	3.0	11.978
4	"The Djinn (No. 43)"	October 22, 2015	Thursdays; 9:00 pm	1.4/5	6.68	1.5	5.157	2.9	11.836
5	"Arioch Cain (No. 50)"	October 29, 2015	Thursdays; 9:00 pm	1.5/5	7.03	1.4	4.632	2.9	11.661
6	"Sir Crispin Crandall (No. 86)"	November 5, 2015	Thursdays; 9:00 pm	1.4/4	6.44	1.5	5.018	2.9	11.454
7	"Zal Bin Hasaan (No. 31)"	November 12, 2015	Thursdays; 9:00 pm	1.5/5	6.75	1.4	4.809	2.9	11.563
8	"Kings of the Highway (No. 108)"	November 19, 2015	Thursdays; 9:00 pm	1.5/5	6.91	1.3	4.485	2.8	11.398
9	"The Director (No. 24)"	January 7, 2016	Thursdays; 9:00 pm	1.6/5	7.52	1.4	4.601	3.0	12.123
10	"The Director, Conclusion (No. 24)"	January 14, 2016	Thursdays; 9:00 pm	1.6/5	7.47	1.4	4.880	3.0	12.352
11	"Mr. Gregory Devry (No. 95)"	January 21, 2016	Thursdays; 9:00 pm	1.6/5	7.42	1.4	5.082	3.0	12.506
12	"The Vehm (No. 132)"	January 28, 2016	Thursdays; 9:00 pm	1.6/5	7.16	1.4	4.579	3.0	11.743
13	"Alistair Pitt (No. 103)"	February 4, 2016	Thursdays; 9:00 pm	1.5/5	6.49	1.4	4.846	2.9	11.375
14	"Lady Ambrosia (No. 77)"	February 11, 2016	Thursdays; 9:00 pm	1.4/4	6.43	1.5	5.061	2.9	11.498
15	"Drexel (No. 113)"	February 18, 2016	Thursdays; 9:00 pm	1.3/4	6.02	1.4	4.985	2.7	11.008
16	"The Caretaker (No. 78)"	February 25, 2016	Thursdays; 9:00 pm	1.3/4	5.97	1.3	4.613	2.6	10.565
17	"Mr. Solomon (No. 32)"	April 7, 2016	Thursdays; 9:00 pm	1.2/4	6.42	1.3	4.629	2.5	11.044
18	"Mr. Solomon: Conclusion (No. 32)"	April 14, 2016	Thursdays; 9:00 pm	1.4/5	6.74	1.1	4.325	2.5	11.062
19	"Cape May"	April 21, 2016	Thursdays; 9:00 pm	1.3/4	7.02	1.3	4.171	2.6	11.188
20	"The Artax Network (No. 41)"	April 28, 2016	Thursdays; 9:00 pm	1.2/4	6.70	1.3	4.502	2.5	11.206
21	"Susan Hargrave (No. 18)"	May 5, 2016	Thursdays; 9:00 pm	1.2/4	6.65	1.4	4.493	2.6	11.144
22	"Alexander Kirk (No. 14)"	May 12, 2016	Thursdays; 9:00 pm	1.3/4	6.62	1.2	4.284	2.5	10.900
23	"Alexander Kirk: Conclusion (No. 14)"	May 19, 2016	Thursdays; 9:00 pm	1.3/4	6.88	1.2	4.446	2.5	11.323
