= Scottie Thompson (actress) =

American actress

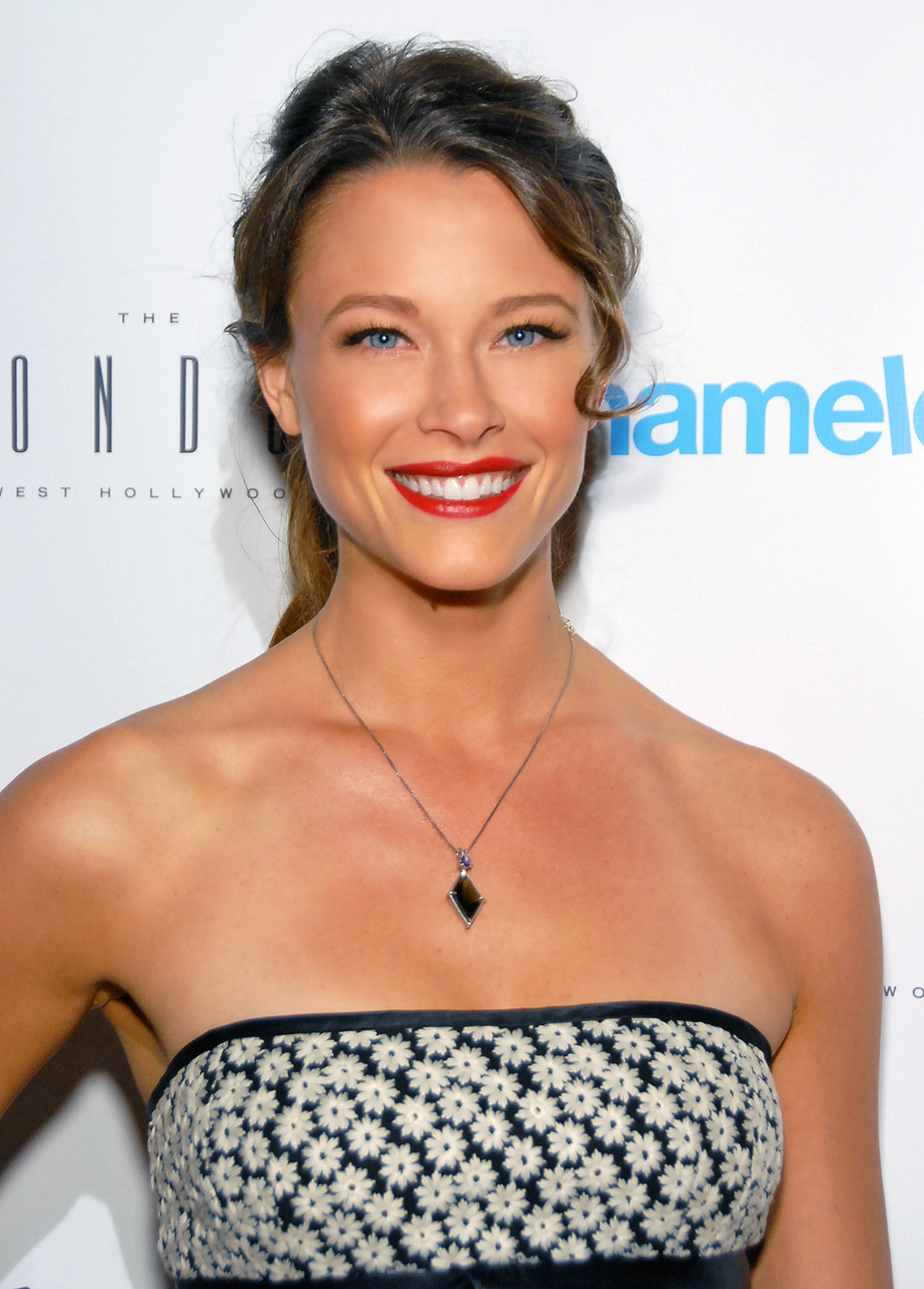
- Scottie Thompson, West Hollywood, California, on September 9, 2011
- Education: Harvard University
- Occupation: Actress
- Years active: 2006–present

Scottie Thompson is an American actress. She is best known for portraying Jeanne Benoit in NCIS.

== Early life ==
At an early age, Thompson began to learn ballet, jazz, and modern dance. She danced with the Richmond Ballet for many years, took a year off after graduating to dance with the company, and then went on to study for a degree in performance studies and literature at Harvard University. Thompson started dancing with the Harvard Ballet Company and acted in many theater productions. She was the publicity manager for the Hasty Pudding Theatricals in 2003, worked for Let's Go Travel Guides, and was credited as associate editor for the travel book Let's Go: Vietnam.

== Career ==
After graduating, Thompson landed her first role in the television show Brotherhood (2006) opposite Jason Isaacs. She then guest-starred in several television shows before landing a recurring role on the CBS show NCIS (2006–2007) as Dr. Jeanne Benoit, the girlfriend of Tony DiNozzo (played by Michael Weatherly) and the daughter of Rene Benoit (played by Armand Assante). She appeared regularly throughout season four and left the show in early season five (she reappeared later that season in the episode "Internal Affairs"). She then filmed the independent movie Pornstar (2008), co-starring Matthew Gray Gubler of Criminal Minds, and made guest appearances on Shark (2007), CSI: NY (2007), and Eli Stone (2008).

In 2008, Thompson appeared in the video for Counting Crows' single "You Can't Count on Me". She also had a small part in J. J. Abrams Star Trek. In February 2010, Thompson was cast in the Brothers Strause alien-apocalypse film Skyline, which was released in November of that year. She also appears in the Bon Jovi music video "What Do You Got?".

In 2013, she was cast as Lauren Kincade in the USA Network TV series Graceland. In 2015, she returned to NCIS as Dr. Jeanne Benoit.

== Filmography ==
=== Film ===
Year	Title	Role	Notes
2009	Star Trek	Nero's wife	
2010	Skyline	Elaine	
2012	Lake Effects	Sara	
2013	37	Jemma Johnstone	
2014	The Lookalike	Mila	
2015	The Leisure Class	Allison	HBO's Project Greenlight season 4 film
2016	The Funhouse Massacre	Sheriff Kate	
2016	Before I Wake	School Teacher	
2017	Broken Ghost	Samantha Day	
2019	Limbo	Cassiel	
2019	Crown Vic	Claire	
2021	Murder at Yellowstone City	Emma Dunnigan	
2026	Hellfire	Lena	

=== Television ===
Year	Title	Role	Notes
2006	Law & Order	Julia Ketchum	Episode: "Magnet"
2006	Brotherhood	Shannon McCarthy	Episodes: "Mark 8:36", "Genesis 27:29", "Matthew 5:6", and "Matthew 12:25"
2006	CSI: Miami	Lindsey Archer	Episode: "Death Pool 100"
2006	Ugly Betty	Photo Editor	Episode: "The Box and the Bunny"
2006–2008, 2015–2016	NCIS	Jeanne Benoit	Recurring role (seasons 4–5, 13), 16 episodes
2007	Shark	Leslie Purcell	Episode: "In the Crosshairs"
2007	CSI: NY	Lia Ramsey	Episode: "Buzzkill"
2008	Eli Stone	Jessica Benson	Episode: "One More Try"
2009	Bones	Kim Mortenson	Episode: "The Critic in the Cabernet"
2009	The Closer	Tara Latimer	Episode: "Smells Like Murder"
2009–2010	Trauma	Diana Van Dine	Main role
2010	Drop Dead Diva	Jocelyn Harold	Episode: "Senti-Mental Journey"
2010	Rizzoli and Isles	Lola	Episode: "I'm Your Boogie Man"
2011	Partners	Mattie Scott	Unsold TV pilot
2011	Deck the Halls	Regan Reilly	TV movie
2012	Lake Effects	Sara Tisdale	TV movie
2012	Nikita	Mia	Episode: "True Believer"
2013	Graceland	Lauren Kincade	Episodes: "Pilot", "Guadalajara Dog", "Heat Run"
2014	CSI: Crime Scene Investigation	Lt. Debbie Hughes	Episode: "The Fallen"
2014	Castle	Tildy	Episode: "For Better or Worse"
2014	The Blacklist	Zoe D'Antonio	Episodes: "The Front", "The Mombasa Cartel", "The Scimitar", "The Decembrist"
2015	Grey's Anatomy	Renee Collier	Episode: "With or Without You"
2015	Zoo	Sheriff Rebecca Bowman	Episode: "The Cheese Stands Alone"
2016	Rosewood	Simone Kilgore	Episode: "Prosopagnosia & Parrotfish"
2016	12 Monkeys	Vivian Rutledge	Episodes: "Year of the Monkey", "One Hundred Years", "Emergence", "Fatherland"
2018	Hope at Christmas	Sydney	TV movie (Hallmark Christmas movie)
2019	My Daughter's Ransom	Rachel	TV movie
2020	NCIS: Los Angeles	Sarah Raines	Episode: "Missing Time"
2020	MacGyver	Ellen MacGyver	Episode: "Tesla + Bell + Edison + Mac" and "Save+The+Dam+World"
2020	9-1-1	Suzanne Barker	Episode: “Powerless
2022	Bel-Air	Angela Wilkes	Episodes: "The Strength to Smile," "Can't Knock the Hustle"
