= The Blacklist =

American crime thriller television series (2013–2023)

- Genre: Crime drama; Action; Thriller
- Created by: Jon Bokenkamp
- Developed by: John Eisendrath
- Starring: James Spader; Megan Boone; Diego Klattenhoff; Ryan Eggold; Parminder Nagra; Harry Lennix; Amir Arison; Mozhan Marnò; Hisham Tawfiq; Laura Sohn; Anya Banerjee
- Composers: Dave Porter; James S. Levine (2013)
- Country of origin: United States
- Original language: English
- No. of seasons: 10
- No. of episodes: 218 (list of episodes)

Production
- Executive producers: Jon Bokenkamp; John Davis; John Eisendrath; John Fox; Joe Carnahan; James Spader
- Producers: Lukas Reiter; Michael W. Watkins; J. R. Orci; Laura Benson; Daniel Cerone
- Production location: United States
- Cinematography: Michael Caracciolo; Sadde Mustafa; Eric Moynier; Frank Prinzi; Arthur Albert; Yasu Tanida
- Editors: Chris Brookshire; David Post; Orlando Machado Jr.; Emily Greene
- Camera setup: Single-camera
- Running time: 40–45 minutes
- Production companies: Davis Entertainment; Universal Television; Sony Pictures Television Studios (Note: Credited as Sony Pictures Television for seasons 1–7.)

Original release
- Network: NBC
- Release: September 23, 2013 – July 13, 2023

Related
- The Blacklist: Redemption (Note: The spin-off takes place simultaneously with the fourth season.)

The Blacklist is an American crime thriller television series created by Jon Bokenkamp and developed by John Eisendrath. It stars James Spader as Raymond Reddington, an international criminal and one of the FBI's Most Wanted fugitives who cooperates with the FBI in hunting down other criminals on his "Blacklist". The series also stars Megan Boone, Diego Klattenhoff, Ryan Eggold, Amir Arison, Hisham Tawfiq, and Harry Lennix.

The Blacklist was given a series order in May 2013, and ran for ten seasons from September 23, 2013, to July 13, 2023, on NBC. The pilot episode garnered 12.6 million viewers in the United States. The series was produced by Davis Entertainment, Universal Television and Sony Pictures Television Studios. Eisendrath, John Davis, and John Fox served as executive producers for the entire run of the series; Bokenkamp also executive produced the series for the first eight seasons. Other executive producers include director Joe Carnahan and Spader.

During its run, The Blacklist won a Primetime Creative Arts Emmy Award and was nominated for six more, and received nominations for two Golden Globe Awards, two Saturn Awards, and two People's Choice Awards. The series has spawned a tie-in media franchise, including comic series, standalone novels, and a video game. A spin-off, The Blacklist: Redemption, also created and developed by Bokenkamp and Eisendrath, aired on NBC from February to April 2017. It shares the same fictional universe with the original series and is focused on Ryan Eggold's character, Tom Keen.

== Plot ==
With a few exceptions, an episode features one of the global criminals whom Raymond Reddington assists the task force in hunting down and capturing. In every such episode, the rank and name or alias of the featured criminal on Red's blacklist are displayed at the close of the opening sequence. Otherwise, only the episode name is shown. The action takes place primarily in present-day Washington, D.C., although other locations around the world are featured occasionally.

=== Seasons 1–8 ===
Raymond "Red" Reddington, an ex-US Naval Intelligence officer who disappeared twenty years earlier to become number 4 on the FBI's Ten Most Wanted Fugitives list, surrenders himself to FBI Assistant Director Harold Cooper at the J. Edgar Hoover Building in Washington, D.C. Taken to an FBI "black site", Reddington declares he wishes to help the FBI track down and apprehend the criminals and terrorists with whom he has spent the last twenty years associating. They are the individuals who are so dangerous and devious that the United States government is unaware of their very existence.

He offers Cooper his knowledge and assistance on two conditions: immunity from prosecution and cooperation only with FBI Special Agent Elizabeth "Liz" Keen, a rookie criminal profiler recently assigned to Cooper's task force. Keen and Cooper are suspicious of Reddington's interest in her, but he will only say that she is "very special". After Cooper tests Reddington's offer in locating and neutralizing Serbian terrorist Ranko Zamani in the first episode, Reddington reveals that this man was only the first on the "blacklist" of global criminals that he has compiled over his criminal career and states that he and the FBI have a mutual interest in eliminating them. The COVID-19 pandemic halted filming of the seventh season finale, leaving it incomplete. To finish the episode, the creators used graphic novel-style animation to complete key scenes.

The mysteries of Reddington and Liz's lives, and his interest in her, are an ongoing theme as the series progresses. She digs into her family's past, the question of his real identity and their connection, while he desperately tries to hide them. Each season, the danger to Liz caused by his reemergence intensifies, and Reddington uses Cooper's task force to protect her. The storyline ends with season 8, when Liz is murdered by a hitman seeking revenge for Red's killing a crime lord. The explanation of Reddington's identity and his interference in Elizabeth's life are never given.

=== Seasons 9–10 ===
Following Liz's death at the end of the eighth season, Cooper's task force has disbanded and Reddington has fled the country. After an absence of two years, however, Reddington returns to help his former bodyguard, Dembe Zuma, who has in the interim become an FBI Special Agent with the assistance of Cooper, when a modern pirate named the "Skinner" nearly kills him. Red promises to retire and move to Cuba with his girlfriend once the Skinner is neutralized. However, when Red begins to take over management of the remains of his empire, he breaks his promise and decides to stay in charge of what he can still control.

Red and Cooper come to an agreement to resume his deal with the FBI and continue hunting down global criminals on his "blacklist" in honor of Liz's undertaking. Cooper manages to find the old task force members and re-create their division. The secret Red kept from Liz becomes irrelevant, and the story now centers on not only Red but also Cooper and the field agents Liz used to work with. Now, the task force must confront new criminals as well as familiar ones who have returned in order to take revenge on Red for his betrayal.

After the threat of the former Blacklisters is neutralized, the task force faces a new threat in the form of ambitious Congressman Arthur Hudson who suspects them of rogue behavior and works tirelessly to uncover their many secrets. They also contend with Red making unexpected moves; using the task force to shut down several central parts of his criminal empire for unknown reasons. It all comes to the point of no return when Reddington closes his operations center responsible for the blacklist and a legal investigation is launched against the task force, forcing Cooper to arrest Red to avoid prosecution of himself and his task force. Reddington evades capture but is fatally gored by a bull in Andalusia, where Ressler discovers his body.

== Cast and characters ==
The Blacklist characters (season 9; 2021–2022) from left to right: Aram Mojtabai (Amir Arison), Harold Cooper (Harry Lennix), Alina Park (Laura Sohn), Raymond Reddington (James Spader), Dembe Zuma (Hisham Tawfiq) and Donald Ressler (Diego Klattenhoff)

=== Main cast ===
- James Spader as Raymond "Red" Reddington: an ex-US Naval Intelligence officer and a master criminal turned FBI confidential informant. During seasons 1–8, Elizabeth and the task force's effort to uncover his true identity is a major ongoing narrative. During season 9, his main concern is ferreting out a traitor within his organization. During the final season, he faces off against former Blacklisters looking for revenge for their downfalls, and an ambitious congressman looking to take down the task force and, by extension, him.
- Megan Boone as Elizabeth "Liz" Keen (seasons 1–8): Born Masha Rostova, Keen is an FBI special agent and profiler on Harold Cooper's task force. Her presence is part of Reddington's deal with Cooper for no apparent reason until her connection to Reddington becomes obvious.
- Diego Klattenhoff as Donald Ressler: an FBI special agent on Cooper's task force.
- Ryan Eggold as Tom Keen (seasons 1–5): Born Christopher Hargrave, later taking the adoptive name Jacob Phelps, Keen works as a covert operative and is Liz's husband.
- Parminder Nagra as Meera Malik (season 1): a field agent with the CIA who worked with Cooper's FBI task force.
  - Nikita Tewani as young Meera Malik (guest season 10).
- Harry Lennix as Harold Cooper: the assistant director of the FBI Counterterrorism Division who uses Reddington to expose and stop people on his blacklist.
- Amir Arison as Aram Mojtabai (recurring season 1; main, seasons 2–9; guest season 10): an FBI special agent and cyber expert on Cooper's task force.
- Mozhan Navabi as Samar Navabi (main seasons 2–6; guest, season 9): a Mossad agent who works with Cooper's FBI task force.
- Hisham Tawfiq as Dembe Zuma (recurring seasons 1–2; main, seasons 3–10): Reddington's bodyguard and confidant, who separated from him and turned FBI special agent with the help of Cooper in season 9.
- Laura Sohn as Alina Park (recurring season 7; main, seasons 8–9): an FBI special agent who previously worked in Anchorage.
- Anya Banerjee as Siya Malik (season 10): Meera's daughter and an intelligence officer with MI6 who comes to work with Cooper's team.

=== Recurring actors ===
- Teddy Coluca as Teddy Brimley: Red's interrogator who uses extravagant methods (usually involving various animals) to make his victims talk.
- Susan Blommaert as Mr. Kaplan: born Kathryn Nemec, Kaplan is Red's cleaner. She has also been a nanny for Liz and therefore is feared for her collaborations with Reddington (seasons 1–4; guest, season 8).
- David Strathairn as Peter Kotsiopulos (seasons 2-3). Better known as “The Director,”, he served as the head of the National Clandestine Service and a leading member of the Cabal. Kotsiopulos sought to eliminate Elizabeth Keen when she became a threat to the Cabal’s interests, leading to his downfall at the hands of Reddington.
- Alan Alda as Alan Fitch, senior member of the Cabal (season 1, four episodes; season 2, one episode).
- Clark Middleton as Glen "Jellybean" Carter: Reddington's tracker "with a twist" (seasons 2–7). He has frequently let Red down but never loses his credibility despite criticism from other members of the team.
- Lotte Verbeek as Katarina Rostova (in flashbacks): the former KGB spy and biological mother of Elizabeth (seasons 3–8). She has been hunted worldwide after the establishment of The Townsend Directive. The question of her fate and location is one of the main storylines in the first eight seasons.
- Deirdre Lovejoy as Cynthia Panabaker: a United States senator from Virginia, formerly a White House counsel who operates the legal aspects of Cooper's taskforce (seasons 3–10). She always tries to act as the law says, bringing trouble to Reddington's illegal cooperations.
- Fisher Stevens as Marvin Gerard: a shadow counsel whom Reddington hires as his attorney (seasons 3–9). He manages most of the empire's dealings, and, being very proud of his achievements, stands up for the benefit of it.
- Brian Dennehy (seasons 3–7) and Ron Raines (season 8) as Dominic Wilkinson: Elizabeth's grandfather who knows some unexpected information about Reddington's past.
- Various actresses (seasons 3–8) and Sami Bray (seasons 9–10) as Agnes Keen: the daughter of Elizabeth and Tom who reflects after any major event occurring to Liz.
- Aida Turturro as Heddie Hawkins: Reddington's financial manager and an owner of a smuggling corporation (seasons 5–10).
- Jonathan Holtzman as Chuck: Reddington's hitman who works alongside Morgan and usually replaces his bodyguards (seasons 5–10).
- Genson Blimline as Morgan: Reddington's operative who usually accompanies Chuck on their missions (seasons 5–9).
- Fiona Dourif as Jennifer Reddington: the elder daughter of Reddington, adopted as Lillian Roth (seasons 5–6; guest, season 8). She helps Liz investigate Reddington's true identity and their shared past.
- Laila Robins as Tatiana Petrova: an operative in Reddington's organization. Assigned as a body double of Katarina Rostova meant to draw suspicion away from her, she ends up on the run instead. She manipulates Liz to get to Reddington, the only man who is aware of the true Katarina's location (guest, season 6; main, seasons 7–8).
- Alex Brightman as Herbie Hambright: a quirky cyber expert who previously worked for Reddington (season 10). He joins the Task Force as Aram's de facto replacement.
- Toby Leonard Moore as Arthur Hudson: an ambitious US Congressman with a passion for exposing government corruption (season 10). He begins to dig into secrets about Cooper's FBI Task Force after noticing the extraordinary amount of funding they receive.
- Seth Numrich as Rakitin: deep cover SVR double agent, who uses his security clearance within the U.S. government to funnel top secret intelligence to N-13 through a mutual friend in the East.

== Episodes ==
Season	Episodes	Originally released		Rank	Average viewers (millions)
Season	Episodes	First released	Last released	Rank	Average viewers (millions)
1	22	September 23, 2013	May 12, 2014	6	14.95
2	22	September 22, 2014	May 14, 2015	14	13.76
3	23	October 1, 2015	May 19, 2016	22	11.19
4	22	September 22, 2016	May 18, 2017	30	9.25
5	22	September 27, 2017	May 16, 2018	42	8.41
6	22	January 3, 2019	May 17, 2019	57	6.87
7	19	October 4, 2019	May 15, 2020	50	6.88
8	22	November 13, 2020	June 23, 2021	51	5.47
9	22	October 21, 2021	May 27, 2022	50	4.77
10	22	February 26, 2023	July 13, 2023	60	3.83

== Production ==
=== Development ===
The idea was kicked around to center a show that is about catching bad guys but with a bad guy at the center of it. And that came about at around the same time that the real-world criminal Whitey Bulger was found. So, the idea was, "Well, what would happen if a man like him turned himself in and said, 'I am here. I have some rules that I want you to follow, but if you follow them I will give you the names of people that I have worked with, during the 20 years that I have been a fugitive.'"

— John Eisendrath on conception of The Blacklist, 2013

The first mention of The Blacklist appeared on August 13, 2012, when Jon Bokenkamp came up with the idea of an international crime series introduced to him by John Fox, his fellow producer The same day it was revealed that NBC had bought rights for the series from Sony. John Eisendrath from Universal Television, John Davis and Fox had already signed a contract as executive producers. NBC ordered a pilot for the series on January 22, 2013, along with three other dramas. Deadline Hollywood reported on March 13, 2013, that the pilot was written by Bokenkamp and directed by Joe Carnahan. On May 10, the series was picked up by NBC for the 2013-14 television season. During an NBC upfront presentation in May 2013, it was announced that The Blacklist was NBC's highest-testing drama for the last 10 years. The official trailer for the series was released on May 12, 2013. Originally, a 13-episode first season was planned, but after the premiere reached 12.3 million viewers, NBC ordered nine additional episodes on October 4, 2013, bringing the season's episode count to 22 episodes.

All four showrunners signed a deal with Sony before the premiere; first, Eisendrath on June 7, 2013, then, Bokenkamp on July 16, and both Davis and Fox on July 29. Additionally, in November 2013 J.R. Orci became a co-executive producer. In 2015, Michael Watkins also became co-executive producer. On June 24, 2021, a day after the finale of season 8 was aired, Bokenkamp revealed that he would not return for future seasons while Eisendrath became the sole showrunner. However, Bokenkamp remained credited as creator in future seasons. On March 14, 2022, Eisendrath prolonged his deal with Universal Television for three additional years.

In February 2018, Watkins was fired over alleged harassment involving a camera assistant. He claimed that there was no reason for firing him and blamed his colleague, Laura A. Benson, for using him as a way to rise in her career. Then, he sued Sony, Laura Benson, and another of his colleagues, Bill Roe, a year later.

The series was renewed for the seventh season on March 11, 2019, and was renewed for its eighth season on February 2, 2020. The seventh season was originally set to consist of 22 episodes. However, the production suffered from COVID-19 pandemic and was shut down in March 2020. Filming of the nineteenth episode has been suspended, while episodes 20, 21 and 22 were never put in production. The producers decided to shorten the episode count to 19 episodes and put off three remaining episodes until season 8. The nineteenth episode, which eventually became the season finale, was produced using filmed material in live-action combined with animation created by Proof, a visual effects company which uses 3D animation software and real-time computer graphics led by Eisendrath's brother in law. The episode aired on May 15, 2020.

Filming for the eighth season resumed in live-action with extra COVID-19 precautions. The eighth season premiered November 13, 2020. On January 26, 2021, the series was renewed for the ninth season. The series was renewed for the tenth season on February 22, 2022, which, unlike the previous renewals, was first announced by Spader himself during his appearance on The Tonight Show, not by a press release. On February 1, 2023, it was announced that the tenth season is going to be the final of the series despite the extension of Eisendrath's contract.

The Blacklist received a panel twice on San Diego Comic-Con. The panel appeared before the show's debut on July 18, 2013, and during a remote special convention on July 23, 2020. On May 11, 2014, NBC decided an episode of the series would air after the 49th Super Bowl.

=== Casting ===
==== Main characters ====
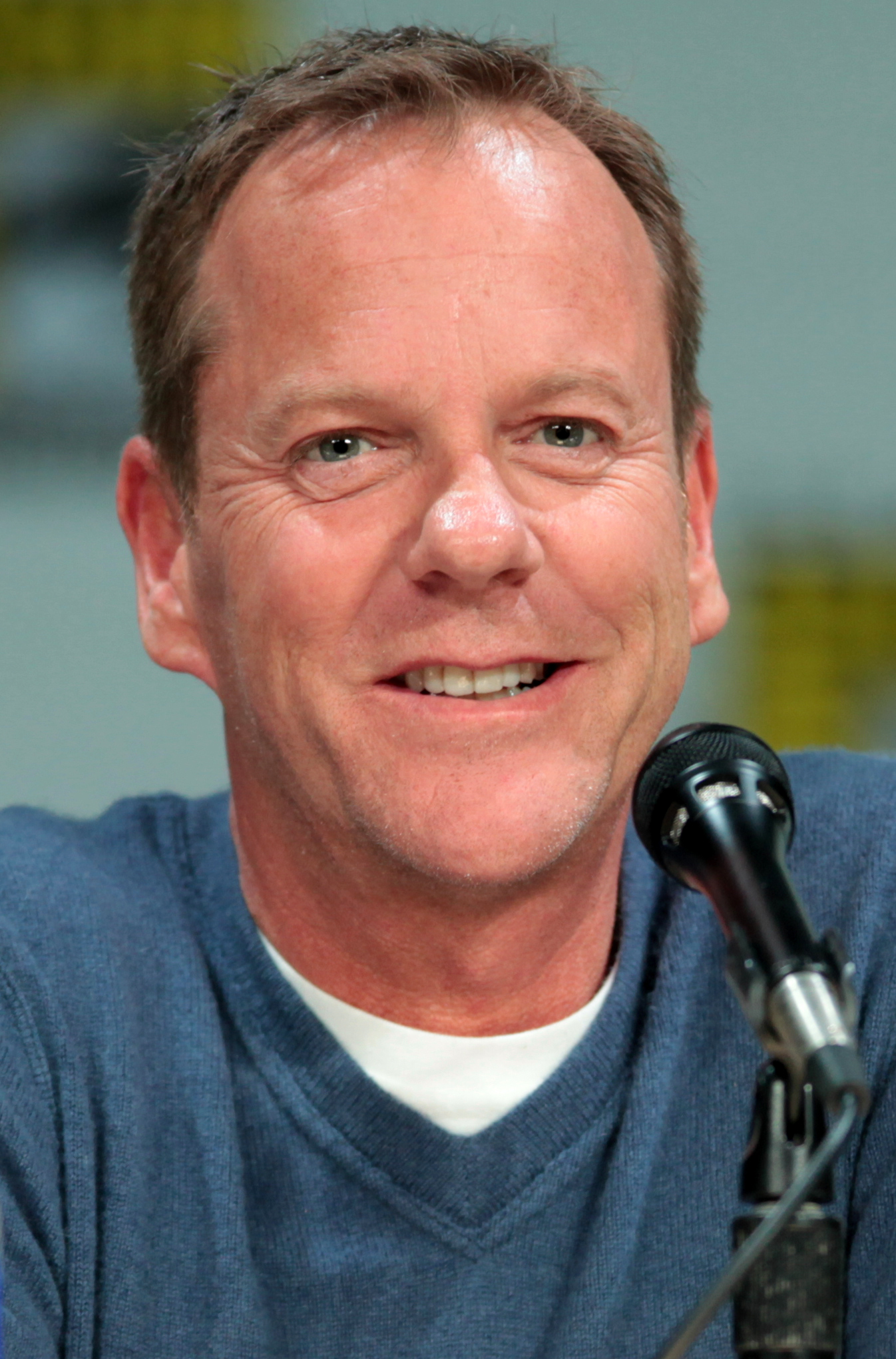
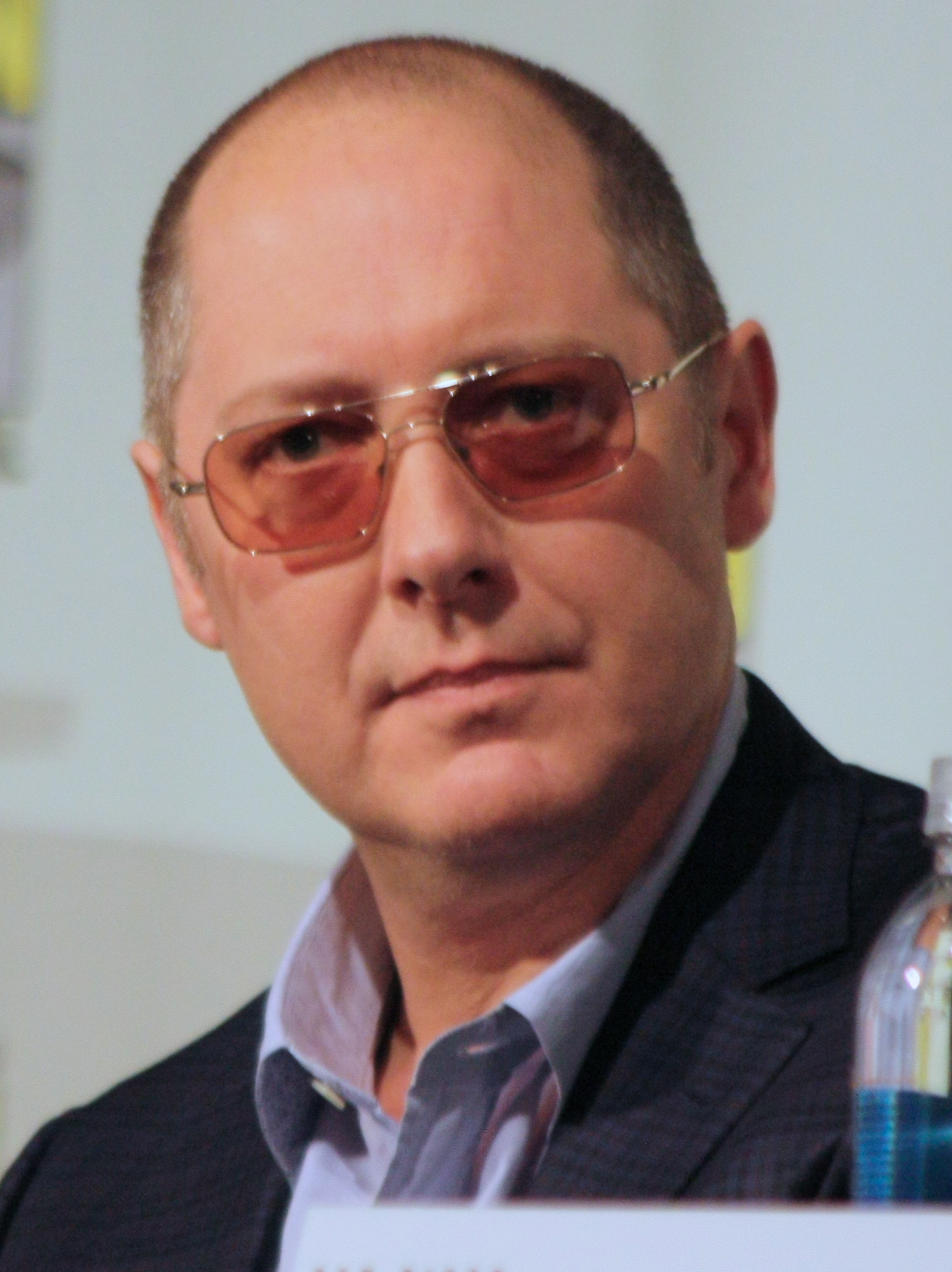
The lead role of Raymond Reddington was intended to be given to Kiefer Sutherland (left); instead, it went to James Spader (right).

John Eisendrath told Collider that the casting process was difficult. In February 2013, he and Bokenkamp invited Kiefer Sutherland, Bryan Cranston, Pierce Brosnan and Richard Gere to apply for the role of Raymond Reddington. In an interview to Variety, Bokenkamp told about his intentions to cast Sutherland for the role, though he also expressed doubt about the significance of the role to all these actors. At last, three days before filming began, they contacted James Spader to see if he would be interested in playing Reddington. After a lengthy remote conversation, Bokenkamp and Eisendrath cast Spader, as they felt confident in his understanding of the character. Spader's vision was for the international criminal to be a bald or short-haired person wearing a hat. The producers rejected his idea, however, Spader insisted on trying on a fedora while screening the pilot; later, the crew felt the hat enhanced Reddington's image and agreed to keep it. In an interview on Late Night with Seth Meyers, Spader admitted that he had gotten into the role of Reddington over the nine seasons; he also noted that to play his role plausibly at the beginning of season nine, he spent a considerable amount of time alone and not appearing on set. Co-star Harry Lennix said about Spader, "Oh my God. It's like playing basketball with LeBron James. Or baseball with Joe DiMaggio. He's tremendous. He's a master. He elevates everybody that's around him."

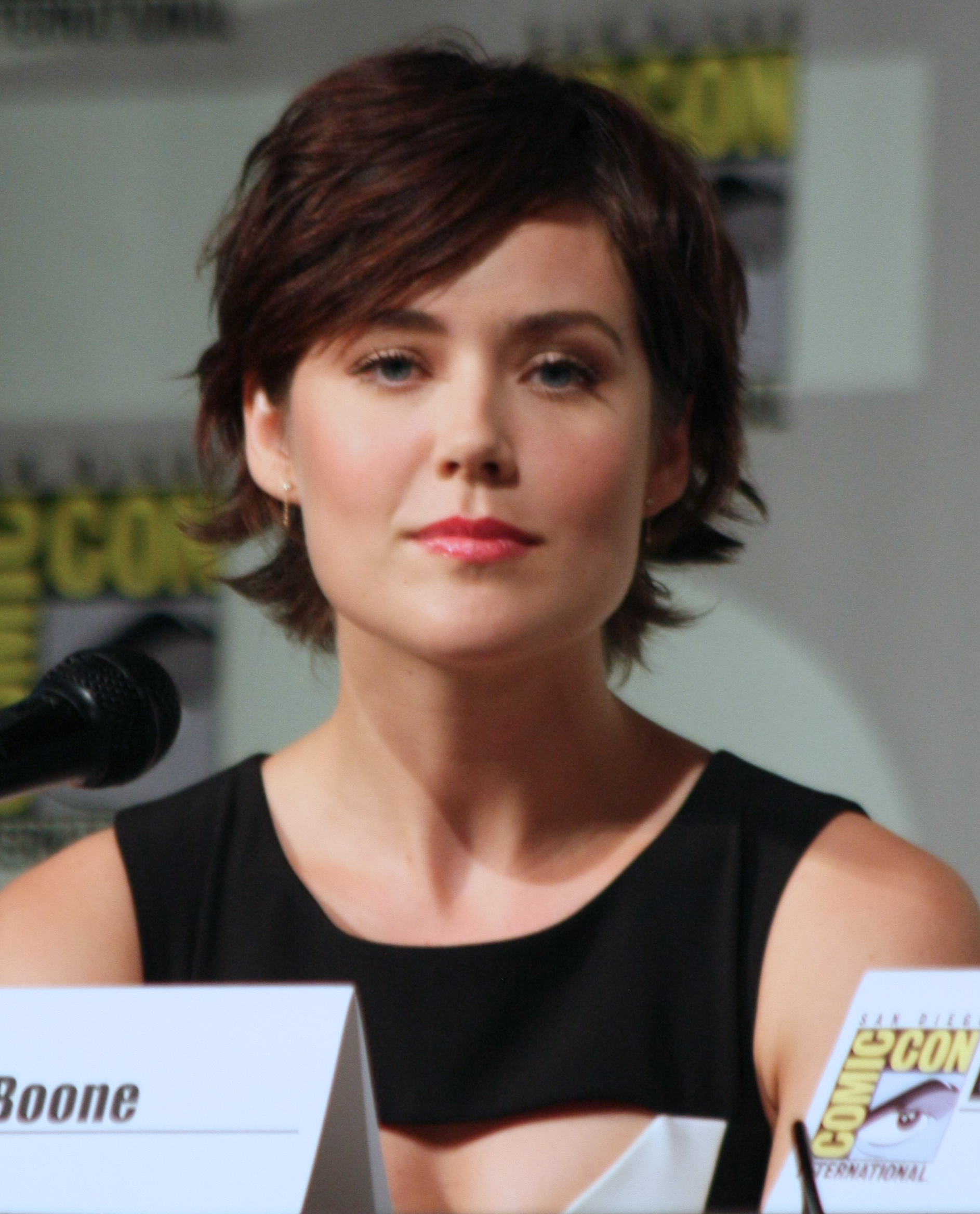
The producers found "something specific" in Megan Boone and cast her for the role of Elizabeth Keen.

Although showrunners attempted to search for a more established actor as they cast Reddington, they invited more obscure performers for the role of FBI profiler Elizabeth Keen. Megan Boone got to know about the role by chance, and she instantly became passionate about it. She had taken a week to prepare for her audition as Keen and had been called back multiple times before she received the role in March 2013. Eisendrath recalled that he and Bokenkamp found "something specific" about Boone, and they got comfortable with her playing of the character. In 2015, Boone revealed her pregnancy which was implemented as a season 3 plot point. She was absent in a part of the season with her character killed, while her subsequent return was kept in secret from the cast. In June 2021, it was revealed that Boone would be leaving the series after season 8, which was initially written to be focused on her departure so as to close the storyline of Elizabeth.

On March 11, 2013, Ryan Eggold accepted the role of Tom Keen, Elizabeth's husband, who has previously worked for Reddington as a spy. In the middle of season 4, Eggold left the series to star in The Blacklist: Redemption, a new spin-off centered on his character, but returned later this season following the cancellation of Redemption. He was ultimately written off the next season. In a 2021 interview, he spoke about an option to return to the series, perhaps as a guest star, stating that it was "not totally out of the realm of possibility".

On March 13, 2013, Diego Klattenhoff joined the series as Donald Ressler, a law-abiding field agent working with Cooper's task force.

The next day, on March 14, 2013, Harry Lennix was cast as Harold Cooper, the leader of a newly formed task force, which cooperates with Reddington. Lennix has appeared in each season of the series; in an interview with Collider, he stated that he would be willing to continue his role into the show's twentieth season, like his favorite TV show, Gunsmoke.

On July 25, 2013, Parminder Nagra joined the cast as Meera Malik, a professional field agent who decides to help Elizabeth settle into her new job. However, she was written out of the series after the first season. Eight years after her departure, Anya Banerjee joined the series for the tenth season in a role of Meera's daughter, MI-6 intelligence officer Siya Malik.

On October 8, 2014, Amir Arison was promoted to a recurring role as Aram Mojtabai, a quirky technician and a professional computer master after he showed some extraordinary on-the-move improvisation skills in his debut episode. He was promoted to series regular on May 20, 2014. After the finale of season 9, Arison departed the series, but return appearances were left possible.

Hisham Tawfiq's appearance as Dembe Zuma was never presumed to exceed a one-time guest appearance. However he managed to prolong his contract first as recurring for the first two seasons, and, on March 31, 2015, earned a place in the main cast. He also noted that producers and scriptwriters gave him permission to alter the story and the past of Dembe based on his own insight and life experience.

Mozhan Navabi joined the cast for the second season on July 29, 2014. Various news sources confirmed that the name of the character she would reprise was Tamar Kartzman, until it was initially changed to Samar Navabi. Samar was a field professional agent recruited by the task force Director and originally working for Mossad who develops relationships with Aram. She officially confirmed her departure on March 29, 2019, in the middle of the sixth season. She returned once, in 2022, during the show's ninth season.

On May 7, 2020, Laura Sohn was promoted to series regular as Alina Park, another new field agent taken into Cooper's task force, also previously recurring in the seventh season. She departed after the series' ninth season.

==== Supporting cast ====
The first season introduced several well-known actors in recurring roles. For the pilot, Ilfenesh Hadera was cast alongside Harry Lennix, playing Jennifer Palmer, a federal agent and a friend of Elizabeth. Alan Alda was cast in a major supporting role in September, as Alan Fitch, the Deputy Director of National Intelligence and one of Red's former allies. To bring the series closer to reality a former CIA agent, Bazzel Baz, was hired by the producers to teach CIA techniques on assaulting buildings to the crew. Baz instead contacted old associates for the scenes, and went on to play a role in the show that was similar to his own experiences in the CIA. Chin Han and Margarita Levieva were among the blacklisters besides Peter Stormare as Berlin. Susan Blommaert and Teddy Coluca also began starring as Reddington's valuable team members.

For the second season, Mary-Louise Parker was cast as Carla Reddington, one of Red's ex-wives. The episode "Luther Braxton" introduced David Strathairn in a guest role of Peter Kotsiopulos, the Director of the National Clandestine Service. Reed Birney played the final blacklister of season two, Tom Connoly, and his death scene in the season finale was met with a standing ovation from the crew. Stormare continued to recur through the season and later departed in the middle of it.

The third season featured numerous celebrities in major recurring roles as well as provided various comebacks of familiar characters. Deirdre Lovejoy was cast as White House Counsel Cynthia Panabaker, set to replace Adriane Lenox, who had left earlier this season. Fisher Stevens debuted as Marvin Gerard, an imprisoned criminal attorney joining Reddington's criminal empire, in the eponymous episode of the third season. Two actors portraying former blacklisters, Lance Henriksen and Margarita Levieva, returned during the third season. Strathairn also returned as one of the lead villains of the season, with two back-to-back episodes under his Blacklist number. The season also featured most of the lead cast from the series' spin-off, The Blacklist: Redemption. In July 2015, Edi Gathegi was revealed as a high-class operative and assassin set up to kill Elizabeth. Famke Janssen was cast as Susan Hargrave, an authoritative criminal magnate and Tom's mother. Ulrich Thomsen served as the blacklister in the finale.

The fourth season opened with the misleading departure of Blommaert after her character Mr. Kaplan was seemingly shot by Reddington. However, Kaplan remained alive till the end of the season. In August 2016, Leon Rippy joined as a ranger and her savior, Hunter, while Enrique Murciano landed a role as Julian Gale, an FBI investigator who previously worked with Ressler on capturing Reddington, in February 2017. Thomsen continued his role as Alexander Kirk, Liz's presumed father, who had been holding her hostage. He left the series in the first half of the season, although the fate of his character remained undisclosed. In the finale, Bazzel Baz, Murciano and Blommaert departed from the series.

The fifth season brought more new recurring characters. In August 2017, it was announced that Michael Aronov, and Aida Turturro would take the recurring roles of Smokey Putnum, the logistician and an embezzler, and Heddie Hawkins, his accountant. In October, Jonny Coyne was cast as Red's nemesis and Tom's murderer, Ian Garvey; his adopted daughter, Lilian Roth, actually Liz's halfsister, Jennifer Reddington, was portrayed by Fiona Dourif. Jonathan Holtzman and Genson Blimline also began starring in recurring capacities as two Reddington's operatives. Nathan Lane played a notable blacklister for the series' 100th episode. John Waters and Julian Sands appeared in season conclusion with Sands portraying Sutton Ross, a spy trying to take revenge on Reddington and the eventual blacklister of the finale. Janssen also returned for one episode.

In the sixth season, Dourif continued to recur in the season while Aronov departed. In November 2018, it was revealed that Coy Stewart would play Vontae Jones, Reddington's innocent cellmate Reddington meets and befriends while in prison. Stacy Keach played financier and con man Robert Vesco, who in real life escaped without payment of $200 million from the U.S. and who was rumored to die from lung cancer in 2007, amidst theories about his pseudocide. In two back-to-back episodes, the series connects Vesco and Reddington as Red searches for a lost treasure. Bokenkamp said about the two actors: "Spader and Keach together are a delight!". Laila Robins also appeared in the season's final minutes as Liz's mother, Katarina Rostova, a subject of the show's major story line.

For the seventh season, Robins was given a recurring role. The Blacklist's showrunners told Deadline and Variety that they were trying to change the format of the series to a family drama, rather than a crime drama as it was intended to be. It was the reason for the introduction of Rostova, who also served as the lead villain of the season. Brett Cullen starred in the season as Ilya Koslov, a person previously pretending to be the real Reddington. In December 2019, Joely Richardson was cast as Cassandra Biancchi, an international thief and the ex-girlfriend of Reddington, for a special episode partly based on Agatha Christie novels. Today host and meteorologist Al Roker appeared in the series' 150th episode as himself.

In the eighth season, various familiar actors returned in guest roles because it was the last season of the original storyline. The series continued casting new characters as well. Reg Rogers was cast in the role of the main antagonist, the mentally disordered crime lord Neville Townsend, who sought revenge on Red after he murdered his family and who launched a bounty hunt on Katarina Rostova. One of his bodyguards, who also assisted in the murder of Elizabeth, Elias Vandyke, was played by Lukas Hassel. Blommaert returned in a guest appearance in the season, as a hallucination of Mr. Kaplan coming for Liz. Dourif also made a cameo appearance in the season. The penultimate episode brought back Robins (who departed after the second episode of the season), Thomsen, and Cullen. Robins was revealed to be Tatiana Petrova, Katarina Rostova's body double, instead of Rostova herself.

In the ninth season, while casting continued for new roles, most of the recurring characters of the previous seasons, such as Lovejoy, Turturro, Holtzman, Blimline and Coluca, maintained their roles. Blimline, whose character died offscreen, departed at the end of the season. In October 2022, Diany Rodriguez and Karina Arroyave revealed that they would be starring in the upcoming season as Cuban sisters Weecha and Mierce Xiu, respectively. Keach and Richardson both returned for one episode. Stevens also left the series after the ninth season's finale which had the title addressed to his character. However, he was still nominated for the 47th Saturn Awards for best guest starring role. Han also returned in the finale, when his character, after being incarcerated for 10 years, escapes from prison and starts gathering blacklisters from all over the world to avenge Reddington.

Two major recurring stars died while starring. Clark Middleton, who played Glen Carter, Reddington's tracker and one of his best friends, from the second to the seventh seasons, and he was scheduled to appear in season eight, but died of West Nile virus in 2020, before the season was filmed. He was honored by the series in one of the episodes of season eight, as his character also died of the same virus; Huey Lewis also appeared as himself. Brian Dennehy, who played Elizabeth's grandfather and Rostova's father, Dominic Wilkinson, also died in 2020. He appeared in guest roles from the third to the seventh season, when he died during the filming of the final episodes. However, his character was included in the animated special, which was filmed in his honor. For storyline purposes, his character was recast with Ron Raines.

=== Filming ===
Despite being set in Washington, D.C., the series is filmed in New York. The series' Task Force headquarters are located at Chelsea Piers which was mostly used while filming Law & Order. Producer Richard Heus said they chose to film specific Washington, D.C. locations for the series, including the Lincoln Memorial, the Washington Monument, and the National Mall, because they were "iconic American locations." All the sets, excluding the Task Force headquarters, are either shot in different locations of the state (Note: Such as New York City (including Staten Island), as well as Westchester, Rockland, Nassau counties.) or are filmed in special sound studios. The process of filming a single episode usually takes an average of nine days, while sometimes two episodes may be filmed simultaneously in order to save time.

The series is filmed in 4K using Sony PMW-F55 cameras that are adapted to use Panavision lenses. It is edited using Avid Media Composer, and editor Christopher Brookshire says the show has "a very distinctive look and pace." An average of three cameras are used at one time, but as many as six cameras are sometimes recording.

The final episode of the series was filmed in Nyack village in Rockland County, New York, on April 24, 2023.

== Broadcast ==
=== Netflix deal ===
On August 28, 2014, Netflix signed a deal with Sony to access The Blacklist through its subscription, with an estimated price of $2,000,000 per episode, the biggest overall deal at that time.

New episode releases varied widely due to shortening Netflix rights in front of local TV networks; it was mostly based on location and local language. In the United States and Canada, the ninth season debuted on October 6, 2022, and September 21, 2022, respectively, prior to the premiere of season 10. In DACH countries and Luxembourg, the ninth season was released on June 26, 2022. In the Netherlands, the ninth season was released on December 3, 2022. In Scandinavian countries, the ninth season was released on October 23, 2022, along with Spain. In Latin America, the premiere date of season eight was scheduled on July 18, 2021, but was changed to June 1, 2022. In France and the majority of French-speaking countries in Africa, the eighth and latest season premiered on Netflix on November 13, 2022.

Some countries with domestic language voiceover did not violate any broadcaster rights and therefore were allowed to release new episodes simultaneously with NBC. For season nine, these countries included India, Israel, South Korea, Hungary, Poland, Russia, (Note: Netflix suspended all its operations in Russia on March 9, 2022, following the start of russian invasion of Ukraine) Portugal, Slovakia and Romania. Netflix also has streaming rights for all nine seasons in Greece and Australia.

The series performed well on Netflix. In almost every country, new seasons scored a place in the local Top 10 and usually remained there for more than a week. The eighth and ninth seasons had most notable performances in Romania, Greece, and DACH countries.

=== Regional broadcasters ===
==== Sony divisions ====
In Asia and Oceania, the series is broadcast by AXN Asia; the tenth season premiered on February 26, 2023, and will air simultaneously with NBC. This excludes Japan, where only two seasons have been broadcast by AXN Japan, although most recent episodes were scheduled to air starting July 18, 2022. In Latin America and Brazil, the series was broadcast by AXN Latin America and AXN Brazil, respectively, with the ninth season awaiting release. In Spain and Portugal, the broadcaster was AXN Portugal, with the tenth season premiering on February 28, 2023. In Germany, Austria and Switzerland, the ninth season was due to premiere on August 2, 2022, on Sony AXN.

Russian channel Sony Turbo, one of three Sony channels in Russia, also broadcast the first four seasons of the series before shutting down on June 24, 2021. Sony Channel Turkey also broadcast the show before closing.

In Hungary, Sony-owned channel Viasat 3 broadcast the first two seasons of The Blacklist, with the second season premiering on April 16, 2015.

==== Local networks ====
In the United States, all episodes were available for purchase on Prime Video. The new episodes were released on Peacock the day after the debut on NBC. The series was broadcast simultaneously on Global in Canada. In France, the first eight seasons were broadcast by TF1, with all seasons available on pay TV service Serieclub. In Germany, the first five seasons were broadcast on RTL Crime. In Italy, the first seven seasons and the first seventeen episodes of season eight were broadcast on Fox Crime before a transfer to Sky Group-owned Sky Investigation. It broadcast the final five episodes of season eight and season nine, which was split into two parts and premiered on December 19, 2021, and July 3, 2021, respectively. Sky Group also had the rights to broadcast The Blacklist in the United Kingdom and Ireland, where season nine premiered on May 11, 2022, on Sky Max, and formerly broadcast the series on Sky One. Spanish channel Energy had the rights to broadcast the first seven seasons, with the latest season premiering on January 22, 2022. The series is also broadcast in Spain through Movistar Plus+, where the tenth season premiered on February 27, 2023, without domestic dubbing, which was later added. In Australia, the broadcast rights belonged to 7 Australia, where the tenth season will premiere on May 22, 2023. In the Netherlands, the tenth season is broadcast on Videoland starting March 6, 2023. In Brazil, the series aired on Rede Globo em 2015, later reairing on Rede Bandeirantes between 2021 to 2025.

== Reception ==
=== Critical response ===
Critical response of The Blacklist
Season	Rotten Tomatoes	Metacritic
1	82% (57 reviews)	74 (32 reviews)
2	83% (18 reviews)	—N/a
3	93% (14 reviews)	—N/a
4	90% (10 reviews)	—N/a
5	100% (5 reviews)	—N/a
6	100% (5 reviews)	—N/a

The first seasons of The Blacklist received mostly positive reviews from television critics. The pilot was lauded by the critics, praising the original plot and cast performance, especially by Spader. At the time, it was usually compared with Hostages, which premiered alongside the series, and Homeland due to the mutual connection between the characters of Reddington and Nicholas Brody and the transfer of Diego Klattenhoff, comparing him to Homeland's Mike Faber. David Wiegand of the San Francisco Chronicle said about the pilot, "You think you know this situation and how it will turn out, but there are surprising, yet entirely credible, twists throughout Monday's episode". Brian Lowry said about the second season, "At times during its first season, 'The Blacklist' felt like two series in one: The very good one starring James Spader as a ruthless criminal, and the more mundane procedural in which he had taken refuge. Thanks to the show's success, though, NBC and the producers have little reason to tinker with that formula, other than having Spader's 'Red' Reddington assume an expanded role within the premiere, while tapping some fine new actors to join (temporarily, perhaps) the program's extended company". Canadian television critic John Doyle from The Globe and Mail wrote a glowing review on the third season, praising Spader's performance, the soundtrack and the plot. He called the series "outstanding and inventing" and wrote, "Network drama isn't dead as long as something like The Blacklist can be created and thrive".

Criticisms of the series mostly arose starting the seventh season. Brian Lowry panned the eighth season, despite previously responding positively to the series. He criticized the mystery of Red's identity, claiming it has been running for too long without a revelation and ended up not being provided. He wrote, "Like any network drama steeped in mythology, the procedural case-of-the-week format lost its luster as the clues and red herrings piled up, until The Blacklist went from a hit to (mostly) an afterthought, certainly in terms of its declining ratings".

=== Ratings ===
Viewership and ratings per season of The Blacklist
Season	Timeslot (ET)	Episodes	First aired		Last aired		TV season	Viewership rank	Avg. viewers (millions)
Season	Timeslot (ET)	Episodes	Date	Viewers (millions)	Date	Viewers (millions)	TV season	Viewership rank	Avg. viewers (millions)
1	Monday 10:00 p.m.	22	September 23, 2013	12.58	May 12, 2014	10.44	2013–14	6	14.95
2	Monday 10:00 p.m. (1–8); Thursday 9:00 p.m. (10–22)	22	September 22, 2014	12.34	May 14, 2015	7.49	2014–15	14	13.76
3	Thursday 9:00 p.m.	23	October 1, 2015	7.76	May 19, 2016	6.88	2015–16	22	11.19
4	Thursday 10:00 p.m.	22	September 22, 2016	6.40	May 18, 2017	4.92	2016–17	30	9.25
5	Wednesday 8:00 p.m.	22	September 27, 2017	6.39	May 16, 2018	5.18	2017–18	42	8.41
6	Friday 9:00 p.m. (1–19); Friday 8:00 p.m. (20–22)	22	January 3, 2019	4.15	May 17, 2019	4.46	2018–19	57	6.87
7	Friday 8:00 p.m.	19	October 4, 2019	4.05	May 15, 2020	4.13	2019–20	50	6.88
8	Friday 8:00 p.m. (1–20); Wednesday 10:00 p.m. (21–22)	22	November 13, 2020	3.72	June 23, 2021	2.24	2020–21	51	5.47
9	Thursday 8:00 p.m. (1–9); Friday 8:00 p.m. (10–22)	22	October 21, 2021	3.11	May 27, 2022	2.82	2021–22	51	4.77
10	Sunday 10:00 p.m. (1–14); Thursday 8:00 p.m. (15–22)	22	February 26, 2023	2.32	July 13, 2023	2.64	2022–23	60	3.83

- Note: The ninth episode of the second season, "Luther Braxton", aired on a Sunday at 10:38 p.m, with Super Bowl XLIX as its lead-in.

=== Accolades ===
Year	Association	Category	Nominee	Result
By academic organizations
2014	Golden Globe Awards	Best Actor – Television Series Drama	James Spader	Nominated
2014	Primetime Creative Arts Emmy Awards	Outstanding Stunt Coordination for a Drama Series, Miniseries, or Movie	The Blacklist	Won
2014	ASCAP Film and Television Music Awards	Top TV Series	Dave Porter for The Blacklist	Won
2014	Hollywood Professional Association Awards	Outstanding Color Grading in Television	Randall Starness for Berlin Conclusion	Nominated
2014	Saturn Awards	Best Network Television Series Release	The Blacklist	Nominated
2014	Saturn Awards	Best Actor in a Television Series	James Spader	Nominated
2015	Golden Globe Awards	Best Actor in Television Series Drama	James Spader	Nominated
2015	Primetime Emmy Awards	Outstanding Guest Actor in a Drama Series	Alan Alda	Nominated
2015	Guild of Music Supervisors Awards	Best Music Supervision for Television Drama	John Bissel	Nominated
2015	Saturn Awards	Best Network Television Series	The Blacklist	Nominated
2016	Primetime Creative Arts Emmy Awards	Outstanding Stunt Coordination for a Drama Series, Limited Series or Movie	The Blacklist	Nominated
2016	Screen Actors Guild Awards	Outstanding Action Performance by a Stunt Ensemble in a Television Series	Stunt Cast (Note: The stunt cast included Airon Armstrong, Kevin Ball, Chris Barnes, Nitasha Bhambree, Michael C. Brennan, Bryce Burke, Jared Burke, Kachina Dechert, Neimah Djourabchi, Paul Drechsler-Martell, Stefanie Flores, Edward Gabree, Christopher Jon Gombos, Tony Guida, Gene Harrison, Greg Harvey, Chad Hessler, Cort Hessler, Donald John Hewitt, Scott Kelly, Pete Klein, Drew Leary, Luke Lesko, Roberto Lopez, Terence Lorino, Stephen Mann, Michael Matera, Chazz Menendez, Luis Moco, Declan Mulvey, James Newman, Josiah Nolan, Christopher Parker, Ashley Pynn, Jodi Michelle Pynn, Bob Roseman, Akos Schenek, Hannah Scott, Derrick Simmons, Brian Smyj, Matt Triplett, Thad Turner, and Aaron Vexler.)	Nominated
2016	Guild of Music Supervisors Awards	Best Music Supervision for Television Drama	John Bissel	Nominated
2017	People's Choice Awards	Favorite TV Crime Drama	The Blacklist	Nominated
2017	Primetime Creative Arts Emmy Awards	Outstanding Stunt Coordination for a Drama Series, Limited Series or Movie	The Blacklist	Nominated
2018	Primetime Creative Arts Emmy Awards	Outstanding Stunt Coordination for a Drama Series, Limited Series or Movie	The Blacklist	Nominated
2019	Primetime Creative Arts Emmy Awards	Outstanding Stunt Coordination for a Drama Series, Limited Series or Movie	The Blacklist	Nominated
2020	Primetime Creative Arts Emmy Awards	Outstanding Stunt Coordination for a Drama Series, Limited Series or Movie	The Blacklist	Nominated
2022	Saturn Awards	Best Action-Thriller Television Series	The Blacklist	Nominated
2022	Saturn Awards	Best Guest Starring Role on Television	Fisher Stevens	Nominated
2022	Primetime Creative Arts Emmy Awards	Outstanding Stunt Coordination for a Drama Series, Limited Series or Movie	The Blacklist	Nominated
2022	Primetime Creative Arts Emmy Awards	Outstanding Stunt Performance	Stunt Cast	Nominated
By magazines
2014	Entertainment Weekly; Season Finale Awards	Best Non-Romantic Cliffhanger	"Berlin (No. 8) Conclusion"	Nominated
2014	Entertainment Weekly; Season Finale Awards	Funniest Moment in a Drama	"Berlin (No. 8) Conclusion"	Nominated
2014	Entertainment Weekly; Season Finale Awards	Weakest/Most Divisive Twist	"Berlin (No. 8) Conclusion"	Nominated
2014	Entertainment Weekly; Season Finale Awards	Best Final Shot	"Berlin (No. 8) Conclusion"	Nominated
2014	Entertainment Weekly; Season Finale Awards	Most Likely to Earn Someone an Emmy Nomination	"Berlin (No. 8) Conclusion"	Nominated
2014	Entertainment Weekly; Season Finale Awards	Biggest Regret That I Didn't See It, I Just Heard or Read About It	"Berlin (No. 8) Conclusion"	Nominated
2014	TV Guide Awards	Favorite Actor	James Spader	Nominated
2014	TV Guide Awards	Favorite Villain	James Spader	Nominated
2014	TV Guide Awards	Favorite Drama Series	The Blacklist	Nominated

== Other media ==
=== Publications ===
Titan Books released an official comic book series based on the series, written by Nicole Phillips and illustrated by Beni Lobel. The series' crew is working in the project as well. The series' editor, David Leach, stated that the comic was "a true extension of the television series". Issue #1 was launched on July 22, 2015, in both comic book and digital stores. The comic series ran across two major storylines and introduced new criminals that were never featured in the series before. The first one, The Gambler, was introduced under the number 148 and ran across the first five volumes in 2015, with the final collection appearing in stores on April 5, 2016. The second one, entitled The Arsonist (No. 123), also continued for five volumes, all of them published through 2016, with the final compilation released in September 2016 for sale. The visual style of the animated scenes for the season seven finale was loosely based on the comics.

There were also two novels based on the series, also introducing new criminals, focusing entirely on their capture. The first one was written by Steven Piziks under the title The Beekeper and was published worldwide by Titan Books on November 29, 2016. The second one, The Dead Ring, written by Jon McGoran, was published on March 28, 2017, also by Titan Books.

=== Games ===
==== Mobile game ====
The mobile game The Blacklist: Conspiracy was released on June 23, 2016, by Gameloft for Android, iOS, and Windows devices. As a member of the task force, the player was able to interact with Reddington, Cooper, and other members and interrogate potential suspects and witnesses. The game mostly consisted of searching for missing items in different environments, as well as mini games to further the investigations. Players could also make decisions that alter the route of the story.

==== City Hunt ====
NBC announced during Super Bowl XLIX that The Blacklist would change its slot from Mondays to Thursdays after the airing of the second-season episode "Luther Braxton" and launched a city scavenger hunt event called Red Is on the Run to Thursdays (originally Red Across America). The participants had to search across the city to find Red's doppelgänger, left by Reddington in order to get lost from the FBI. The first person who found him in their city was awarded $500, the second one earned $300, and the third received $200. The Blacklist official accounts on Twitter and Facebook, in addition to NBC and CBS news affiliates and regional stations published hints on their location through the hunt.

The competition was held from February 2 to February 5, 2015, in 25 cities across the United States, including New York, Chicago, Washington, D.C., Sacramento and Seattle. In the conclusion, on February 9, 2015, a national $25,000 lottery was held, where the participants had to answer the questions about the recently released Luther Braxton Conclusion. The winner was a resident of Washington, D.C., which was announced in The Blacklist social media accounts.

=== Spin-off ===
In March 2016, NBC began developing a spin-off series, created and produced by the crew of The Blacklist, with the official announcement regarding the cast and crew given on March 29, 2016. Ryan Eggold was set for the lead role, playing Tom Keen, with a family relations buildup similar to what seasons seven and eight of the original series introduced. The series follows Tom leaving Washington, D.C. for New York City, where he discovers the secrets of his past and learns the truth about his mother, Susan Hargrave (née Halsted), and his father, Howard Hargrave, who was presumably dead. As Tom works at Susan's security firm, he leads her to the truth about Howard being alive, which develops into a rivalry between Susan and Howard, forcing Tom to choose his allies.

Famke Janssen and Terry O'Quinn were cast as Susan and Howard Hargrave, respectively. Janssen joined the cast since the beginning of developing, reprising her role from the original series, while O'Quinn was cast on December 12, 2016. Edi Gathegi, Tawny Cypress and Adrian Martinez also reprised their roles from The Blacklist as Mathias Solomon, Nez Rowan and Dumont, respectively. With all supporting cast appearing through the third season of The Blacklist, episodes "Susan Hargrave" and "Alexander Kirk" served as a backdoor pilot for the series, to that date unnamed.

On May 14, 2016, an eight-episode pickup for the series, which was entitled The Blacklist: Redemption, was announced by NBC. David Amann joined as a fifth executive producer alongside Bokenkamp, Eisendrath, Davis and Fox. It aired in the same Thursday slot as The Blacklist while the original series took a break. It premiered on February 23, its final episode aired on April 13, and was canceled after one season due to low ratings. Eggold, who left the mothership series for the spin-off, continued his role on the fifth season of The Blacklist. Despite low ratings among audiences aged 19–49, it received generally favorable or mixed reviews from critics, with no score on either Rotten Tomatoes or Metacritic.

== In popular culture ==
UK drill rapper Sus references The Blacklist several times in the second verse of his track "Dug Out", including the lines "Me and my shooter Red and Dembe" and "I'm keen for Elizabeth, get paid".
