= Alpha (The X-Files) =

- The X-Files episode
- The Wanshang Dhole. The creature was the impetus for the episode, but was derided by several critics for being boring and uninventive.
- Episode no.: Season 6 Episode 16
- Directed by: Peter Markle
- Written by: Jeffrey Bell
- Production code: 6ABX16
- Original air date: March 28, 1999
- Running time: 45 minutes

Guest appearances
- Andrew Jordt Robinson as Dr. Ian Detweiler; Melinda Culea as Karin Berquist; Thomas F. Duffy as Jeffrey Cahn; James M. Connor as Jake Conroy; Michael Mantell as Dr. James Riley; David Starwalt as Officer Frank Fiedler; Tuan Tran as Fong; Yau-Gene Chan as Woo; Dana Lee as Yee; Lisa Picotte as Stacey Muir; Mandy Levin as Angie; Treva Tegtmeier as Peggy; Adrienne Wilde as Nurse

Episode chronology
← Previous "Arcadia"	Next → "Trevor"

"Alpha" is the sixteenth episode of the sixth season of the science fiction television series The X-Files. It premiered on the Fox network on March 28, 1999, in the United States. The episode was written by Jeffrey Bell, and directed by Peter Markle. The episode is a "Monster-of-the-Week" story, unconnected to the series' wider mythology. "Alpha" earned a Nielsen household rating of 10.1, being watched by 17.7 million people in its initial broadcast. The episode received mostly negative reviews from critics.

The show centers on FBI special agents Fox Mulder (David Duchovny) and Dana Scully (Gillian Anderson) who work on cases linked to the paranormal, called X-Files. Mulder is a believer in the paranormal, while the skeptical Scully has been assigned to debunk his work. In this episode, Mulder and Scully investigate several killings blamed on an Asian dog called the Wanshang Dhole, thought to be extinct. Mulder and Scully join an obstinate Sheriff, a seemingly eccentric hunter, and a reclusive canine expert to find it. However, there is more mystery to the expert than meets the eye.

"Alpha" was based on a single motif—"Scary dogs in the City"—written by Jeffrey Bell onto a notecard. The episode went through several drafts before being readied right before filming began. Several of the scenes featuring the Chinese freighter were created either through digital technology or through the combination of matte paintings and actual filmed footage.

== Plot ==
On a freighter in the South Pacific, two Chinese men inspect a crate containing an animal. When the ship reaches the Port of Los Angeles, both are found dead from vicious bite wounds and the animal is missing. After Fox Mulder (David Duchovny) receives word of the attack from canine behavior expert Karin Berquist (Melinda Culea), he and Dana Scully (Gillian Anderson) investigate with San Pedro officer Jeffrey Cahn (Thomas F. Duffy). Meanwhile, in Bellflower, California, a man is killed by a wolflike creature with glowing red eyes.

At the port, cryptozoologist Dr. Ian Detweiler (Andrew Robinson) identifies the missing animal as a Wanshang dhole, a species thought to be extinct. After investigating the second attack, Mulder believes the dhole has near-human intelligence. Berquist tells the agents that the species is extinct, but later finds a five-toed paw print at another attack scene. Elsewhere, a man is seen transforming into the dhole before killing a dog catcher.

Later, Detweiler visits a veterinarian to obtain tranquilizers. The dhole attacks the vet and then assumes the form of a wounded Saint Bernard, revealing that it can change its shape. Scully begins to question Berquist's motives, while Mulder suspects Detweiler after learning he was at the veterinary office. He theorizes that Detweiler is the dhole and has been tranquilizing himself in an attempt to suppress his transformations. After Cahn confronts Detweiler, the dhole attacks and severely injures him.

Mulder confronts Berquist, who admits that she also suspects Detweiler and predicts that he will try to kill Cahn in the hospital. Instead, Detweiler, in the form of the dhole, comes to Berquist's home. She deliberately confronts him, and during the attack they fall from an upstairs window. Mulder and Scully arrive to find both dead, with Detweiler impaled on a fence spike.

== Production ==
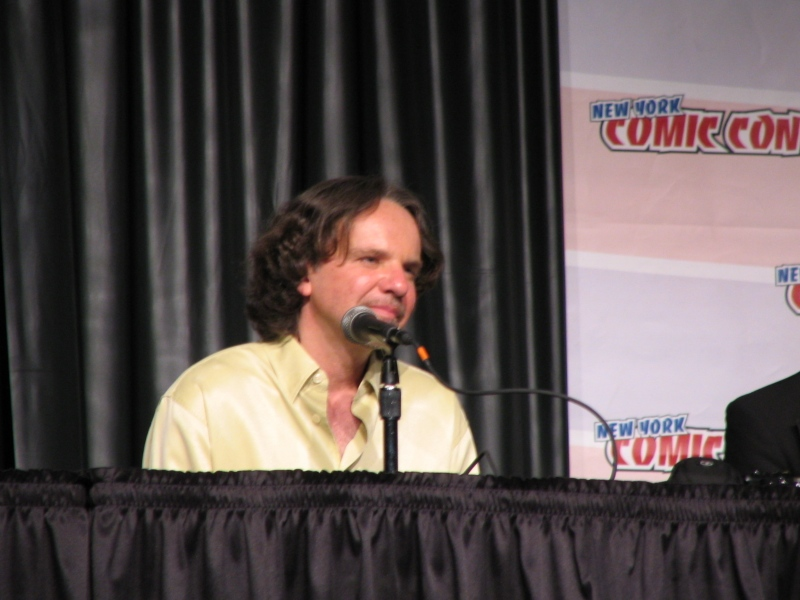
Producer Frank Spotnitz proposed the idea that Mulder and Berquist would be drawn to each other.

=== Writing ===
"Alpha" was written by Jeffrey Bell after seeing a pack of wild dogs. He explained: "Nobody owns [wild] dogs," he noted, "yet these dogs are somehow surviving." Soon thereafter, Bell pitched an idea about "scary dogs in the city" to the writing crew of The X-Files, and it was chosen to go into production. Initially, the story was going to be a "reversal" of 1963 movie The Incredible Journey, featuring "a desperate family [that] moves three thousand miles to get away from their killer pet—who's waiting for them at their new house, really pissed." The story then morphed into one in which a child released his anger through the dogs at a local animal shelter, who functioned as a manifestation of the child's id. Bell scrapped both of these ideas because they lacked "really cool visuals."

After discarding two drafts, Bell approached producer Frank Spotnitz for help. Spotnitz suggested that the main antagonist could be a dog that escapes from a ship and goes on a killing spree. Spotnitz also proposed that Mulder and Berquist develop a quasi-romance before the latter is killed at the end of the episode. Bell began to write the script on January 2, 1999, a mere three weeks before pre-production was scheduled to begin.

=== Casting and filming ===
Dozens of trained dogs were auditioned to play the part of the Wanshang Dhole, a process executive producer Michael Watkins later called "a nightmare." Eventually, the producers selected three wolf-Malamute hybrids. Casting director Rick Millikan noted that he auditioned "many, many women" for the part of Karin Berquist. Melinda Culea, the wife of Peter Markle—who happened to direct this episode—was later cast in the role. Although Culea was chosen because she was affiliated with Markle, a majority of the cast and crew "deemed [her] to have done a fine job." Two Cantonese Chinese-speaking immigrant actors were cast to play the parts of Woo and Yee, the sailors who are killed by the Wanshang Dhole in the beginning of the episode.

Due to the fact that the show was operating on a strict budget, shots of the Chinese freighter were almost entirely created using digital technology. For the opening scene a matte painting of a freighter—based on a toy model—was superimposed over film of an empty stretch of ocean. Several scenes featuring the ship in port were created by filming an empty harbor and then superimposing a ship in post-production. For attack scenes, special effects makeup supervisor John Vulich created a fake latex throat that could be bitten out by the Wanshang Dhole.

=== Alternate ending ===
On the season six DVD, an alternate ending to "Alpha" is included. In this version, Mulder receives Berquist's "I Want to Believe" poster and hangs it on his wall. The scene then cuts to Officer Cahn recuperating in a hospital bed. When the attending nurse closes the curtains around him, his eyes flash red, insinuating that he now possesses the Wanshang Dhole's morphing abilities.

== Reception ==
"Alpha" first aired in the United States on March 28, 1999. This episode earned a Nielsen rating of 10.1, with a 15 share, meaning that roughly 10.1 percent of all television-equipped households, and 15 percent of households watching television, were tuned in to the episode. It was viewed by 17.7 million viewers. The episode aired in the United Kingdom and Ireland on Sky1 on June 20, 1999, and received 1.02 million viewers, making it the most watched episode that week.

Critical reception to the episode was mostly negative. Zack Handlen of The A.V. Club awarded the episode a "C" and called it a "muddled, tepid bit of television that never really seems to know what story it’s trying to tell". He noted, that while the episode is built around a distinctly "old structure" that harkens back to the show's earlier seasons, the plot becomes predictable quickly. Ultimately, however, he concluded that the episode is compromised by its story which "would’ve been a dud even if it had aired back in 1993". He did, however, compliment the character of Karin Berquist, but wished the episode would have focused more on her and Mulder's relationship. Robert Shearman, in his book Wanting to Believe: A Critical Guide to The X-Files, Millennium & The Lone Gunmen, rated the episode one star out of five, and noted that "no matter how good the effects, there's a limit to the number of times a dog with glowing red eyes pouncing on a human can be interesting." Shearman was also critical of the romantic connection between Mulder and Karin Berquist, calling the sub-plot "an attempt to instill a bit of emotion into this repetitive and formulaic tale [that] fails utterly."

Paula Vitaris from Cinefantastique gave the episode a negative review and awarded it one-and-a-half stars out of four. Vitaris called the episode a "run-of-the-mill monster-of-the-week episode" and noted that David Duchovny and Gillian Anderson had "very little energy". Furthermore, she noted that several of the secondary characters were only in the plot "to be killed, nothing more". Cyriaque Lamar from i09 sarcastically labeled the dhole as "The Were-St. Bernard" and called the episode one of "The 10 Most Ridiculous X-Files Monsters".

Not all reviews were negative, however. Tom Kessenich, in his book Examination: An Unauthorized Look at Seasons 6–9 of the X-Files gave the episode a more positive review, writing "Perhaps I am alone in sensing the off-beat love story I found to be at the heart of 'Alpha'. But it reached out and grabbed me and I found it to be touching, interesting and worthy of analysis."

== See also ==
- List of unmade episodes of The X-Files

== Bibliography ==
- Kessenich, Tom (2002). Examination: An Unauthorized Look at Seasons 6–9 of the X-Files. Trafford Publishing. ISBN 1-55369-812-6.
- Meisler, Andy (2000). The End and the Beginning: The Official Guide to the X-Files Season 6. HarperCollins. ISBN 0-06-107595-7.
- Shearman, Robert (2009). Wanting to Believe: A Critical Guide to The X-Files, Millennium & The Lone Gunmen. Mad Norwegian Press. ISBN 978-0-9759446-9-1.
