= The Blacklist season 5 =

Season of television series

The Blacklist
- Season 5
- Promotional poster
- No. of episodes: 22

Release
- Original network: NBC
- Original release: September 27, 2017 – May 16, 2018

Season chronology
- ← Previous; Season 4 Next → Season 6

The fifth season of the American crime thriller television series The Blacklist premiered on NBC on September 27, 2017, with a timeslot change from Thursday at 10:00 PM to Wednesday at 8:00 PM. The season was produced by Davis Entertainment, Universal Television and Sony Pictures Television, and the executive producers are Jon Bokenkamp, John Davis, John Eisendrath, John Fox, and Joe Carnahan. The season contained 22 episodes and concluded on May 16, 2018. The season aired the series' 100th episode.

== Overview ==
Following the war between Raymond Reddington and Mr. Kaplan in the previous season, Raymond's greatest secret - in the form of a suitcase containing an unidentified human skeleton - has been missing and Raymond and Dembe Zuma desperately search for it. During the search, they are faced by a new adversary Ian Garvey (Jonny Coyne), a corrupt Deputy US Marshal and drug kingpin who wants the suitcase to undermine Raymond's criminal empire, putting a danger to Raymond's allies, especially to FBI Special Agent Elizabeth Keen. Elizabeth questions the relationship with Raymond about whether he is her biological father or not as was hinted at the end of Season 4. She later discovers the existence of one person (Fiona Dourif) who has an unexpected connection to Reddington, leading to the unsettling discovery at the end of the season.

== Cast ==
=== Main cast ===
- James Spader as Raymond "Red" Reddington
- Megan Boone as Elizabeth Keen
- Diego Klattenhoff as Donald Ressler
- Ryan Eggold as Tom Keen
- Harry Lennix as Harold Cooper
- Amir Arison as Aram Mojtabai
- Mozhan Marnò as Samar Navabi
- Hisham Tawfiq as Dembe Zuma

=== Recurring ===
- Michael Aronov as Joe "Smokey" Putnum, Red's new henchman, circus carney and master of logistics.
- Aida Turturro as Heddie Hawkins, Red's new accountant and money manager.
- James Carpinello as Henry Prescott, a fixer who is extorting Agent Ressler.
- Jonny Coyne as Ian Garvey, a corrupt U.S. Marshal and drug kingpin.
- John Noble as Raleigh Sinclair III, AKA The Alibi, who can create near-perfect doubles and alibis.
- Fiona Dourif as Lillian Roth/Jennifer Reddington, the daughter of Raymond Reddington and Liz's ally.
- Piter Marek as Nik Korpal, a doctor and Liz's former boyfriend.
- Karl Miller as Pete McGee, a disgraced former doctor who assists Tom with his search for the true identity of the bones.
- Ana Nogueira as Lena Mercer, Pete's girlfriend who helps Tom find Pete.
- Lenny Venito as Tony Pagliaro/The Mailman, a corrupt U.S. Postal Service employee and Red's henchman.
- Evan Parke as Detective Norman Singleton, lead investigator and a member of Garvey's task force.
- Clark Middleton as Glen Carter, a DMV employee who occasionally assists Red.
- Happy Anderson as Bobby Navarro, one of Garvey's henchmen.
- Shane Patrick Kearns as Judson, one of Garvey's henchmen.
- Jonathan Holtzman as Chuck

== Episodes ==
No. overall	No. in season	Title	Blacklist guide	Directed by	Written by	Original release date	US viewers (millions)
90	1	"Smokey Putnum"	No. 30	Bill Roe	Jon Bokenkamp & John Eisendrath	September 27, 2017	6.39
Following Mr. Kaplan's death, Reddington's criminal empire is in ruins and he has set up his new base of operations in a budget motel. He enlists newly discovered daughter Liz Keen to help him rebuild his empire, claiming that he can only be of use to the FBI if he's in a position of power and influence. He wants to capture the next blacklister, alleged embezzler and circus hand Smokey Putnum, and bring him in for trial and collect the bounty. It is revealed that Putnum has been stealing money from a neo-Nazi drug cartel which is now trying to kill him. Red and Liz manage to avoid the killers and deliver Putnum. Red also frees Putnum's accuser and accomplice Heddie Hawkins, thus ensuring Putnum's freedom. Red offers both positions in his rebuilt organization and they accept. Meanwhile, Ressler is in an awkward position following Hitchin's death, as his fixer Henry Prescott is now blackmailing him. Aram and Samar's romance escalates. Also, Tom Keen returns with a mysterious briefcase with a skeleton in it. He resolves to identify the remains, whatever the cost.
91	2	"Greyson Blaise"	No. 37	Don Thorin	Lukas Reiter & Jon Bokenkamp	October 4, 2017	5.87
Reddington enlists Liz and the Task Force to track down a blacklister named Greyson Blaise, a self-made billionaire who moonlights as a high-end thief, to help Reddington with his crumbled empire. Red piques Blaise's interest with a fake missing Rembrandt painting and "borrows" a villa in Italy to stage an elaborate party for Blaise's benefit. Red gives the phony painting to Blaise, who is subsequently arrested by Italian authorities after leaving the villa with the painting. Red then goes to Blaise's home while he's in custody and convinces the staff that he's an ally, while stealing several valuable items from the house. Meanwhile, Tom convinces Liz's former flame Nik to help him with the roadblocks he encounters when trying to identify the remains in the suitcase without Liz or Reddington finding out. Tom witnesses Red murdering of one of Mr. Kaplan's henchmen after Red finds him and demands information about the suitcase.
92	3	"Miss Rebecca Thrall"	No. 76	Adam Weisinger	Jonathan Shapiro & Taylor Martin	October 11, 2017	5.79
Reddington enlists Tom to help with his plan to help rebuild his criminal empire. Meanwhile, the Task Force investigates a series of suspicious police shootings involving people with checkered pasts who are owed large monetary settlements. The Task Force questions the police officers involved and conclude that the shootings are dirty. Red discovers that a revolutionary named Rivera and his men are trying to obtain guns promised by Red, who doesn't have them. Red convinces Glen to loan him the money to buy the guns. Liz and the Task Force discover that Rebecca Thrall is simultaneously buying life insurance policies on the victims while also loaning money to desperate police officers to ensure that the insurance must pay off. They deduce the next officer and her target and narrowly prevent his murder. The Task Force lures Thrall into a meeting with the officer and captures her. Red and his new lieutenants fake a police raid to capture Rivera when he appears to accept his guns and Red takes the guns, money, and Rivera's plane and repays Glen.
93	4	"The Endling"	No. 44	Michael Watkins	Noah Schechter	October 18, 2017	5.46
Liz and the Task Force investigate a female blacklister who appears to be trying to destroy world treasures to create unique, priceless items. The Task Force thinks that they have her next target, a Montenegrin princess who is the only heir of her line. When the woman kidnaps the assistant of the princess instead, they realize that her true goal is to capture enough "Golden Blood" carriers (donors suitable for very rare blood types) to save her ailing son. Meanwhile, Reddington seeks an opportunity to regain revenue for his criminal empire and finds one in creating an Airbnb for criminals after encountering a theft ring run by Anthony Pagliaro that uses postal vacation notices. Red and Liz find the woman (Nirah Ahmad) before she can start the operation, which would be fatal to the other donors. Red offers an alternative and Nik is called in to perform a heart transplant. Nirah commits suicide to provide the heart. Red expresses gratitude but Nik says that he never wants to be contacted again by either Red or Liz. Tom surreptitiously uses Liz's FBI ID card to facilitate the search for the identity of the remains. When Nik goes to get the DNA test results from Pete, he is killed by an unknown person and the suitcase with the remains is taken.
94	5	"Ilyas Surkov"	No. 54	Kurt Kuenne	Brandon Margolis & Brandon Sonnier	October 25, 2017	5.23
Liz and the Task Force are tracking down a blacklister and international terrorist named Ilyas Surkov, a man who Red insists died 15 months ago. Liz is shocked to discover Nik's murder and asks Red for help finding his killer. The Task Force finds a lead on Surkov in Belgrade and sends Samar undercover to meet with the contact. Both Samar and the contact are scooped up by a mysterious van. The Task Force finds the van and confronts the team leader, named Tobias Reuther, who claims that they are part of a CIA team tracking Surkov. Cooper finds out from the CIA Director of Operations that the team identifying themselves as CIA are imposters. The two teams have a shootout but Reuther escapes. The Task Force discovers that "Surkov"'s next target is a Navy ship in Norfolk, VA. When they arrive, Reuther is there but claims that the bombing is a CIA operation that he wants to stop. Liz captures Reuther but the bomb goes off. Cooper confronts the CIA Director of Operations, who claims that bombing destroyed a compromised communication system. Cooper intends to report his conduct to his supervisors. Meanwhile, Reddington and Heddie find a new pet business venture. Tom investigates Nik's murder and finds Pete's girlfriend Lena, who refuses to help. Reddington finds a key and cell phone on Nik's remains. Aram requests operational training from Cooper. Reddington traces a connection with the suitcase to Tom.
95	6	"The Travel Agency"	No. 90	Terrence O'Hara	Carla Kettner	November 1, 2017	5.25
Red informs the Task Force that a murder for hire is about to be committed by a blacklister called The Travel Agency, which had been inactive for the last 12 years. Cooper takes temporary leave to take care of a personal matter. Ressler is made Acting Director and leads the task force to the murder target, whose death they are unable to prevent. Tom continues his quest to identify the remains in the suitcase, but runs into Red, who knows he has it. The Task Force identifies the known employees of The Travel Agency, who have all been killed except one. Cooper, Red, and Dembe aid a young man known to Cooper who has been hiding from a corrupt police officer trying to kill him. The Task Force saves the last Agency employee, who informs the agents about the identity of the assassin, Calvin Dawson. The Task Force goes to the Dawson home and discovers that Dawson has anterograde amnesia and his wife Eleanor has been using his condition and her knowledge of The Travel Agency's protocols to manipulate Dawson into killing his former employers and associates. After the couple is cornered by the Task Force, Eleanor kills them both in a murder-suicide to atone for their many crimes, including the loss of their daughters. Tom convinces Lena to help, but a man threatens Lena and insists she drop the investigation. After closing an emotional case, Liz decides that she wants to marry Tom and they rush to the courthouse.
96	7	"The Kilgannon Corporation"	No. 48	Jean de Segonzac	Lukas Reiter	November 8, 2017	5.04
After dozens of immigrants die off the Carolina coast, Reddington and the Task Force investigate a human smuggling operation. Dembe poses as a Nigerian immigrant and identifies the smugglers as Colin and Arthur Kilgannon. When Red confronts the elder Kilgannon (Arthur) about the deaths and the conditions on the smuggling ship, Arthur in turn questions his son Colin, but the resulting clash is fatal for Arthur. In an effort to build a case against the Kilgannons, Dembe joins dozens of other refugees hoping to be smuggled into Germany. Tom and Lena locate Pete, who Tom believes killed Nik, but they are captured by armed men interested in the secret of the suitcase. The Kilgannon smuggling base is raided by local authorities, but several trucks including Dembe's have already left the facility and been abandoned in remote locations. Red tracks down Colin and forces him to help locate the trucks before killing him. Red finds Dembe's truck in time to save him from carbon dioxide poisoning before the team, Red, and Dembe work together to help ten migrants escape. Pete and Lena are executed by Ian Garvey, and Tom's life is at risk as Garvey reveals that its secret is important to Reddington and a means to control him.
97	8	"Ian Garvey"	No. 13	Bill Roe	John Eisendrath & Jon Bokenkamp	November 15, 2017	5.89
Now that he possesses the suitcase, Garvey wants Tom to set up a meeting with Red. Liz realizes that Tom is in trouble when he stops answering her calls, and the Task Force searches for him. Tom tricks Garvey into leaving for a phony meeting location and escapes with the suitcase. Red and Dembe pick up Tom and the three get into a shootout with Garvey and his men and only narrowly escape. Tom steals the contents of the suitcase and eludes Red. Tom reads the DNA report and discovers Red's secret. He arranges to meet Liz, but both are captured by Garvey and his men. Garvey brutally stabs Tom multiple times and takes back the suitcase. He then orders Navarro and his men to dispose of Liz and Tom, but Red and Dembe intervene just in time. After being in a coma for 10 months, Liz wakes up while Reddington is reading to her. She asks about Tom, and Red informs her that Tom has died from his injuries.
98	9	"Ruin"	None	Michael Caracciolo	Sean Hennen	January 3, 2018	6.02
Liz is living in a remote cabin in Alaska under an alias to mourn Tom's death. She leaves Agnes in the care of an exonerated Scottie Hargrave and asks Red not to follow or monitor her. During an ice storm, she finds a critically injured man in the woods. Soon afterward four other men arrive, claiming to be friends of the wounded man and victims of a plane crash. Sensing trouble but without a working weapon, Liz is forced into a cat-and-mouse game to survive and save the injured man, who turns out to be a federally protected witness being hunted by the other four men. After killing the four men with carefully laid traps and a flare gun, Liz returns home, leaving no traces of her identity in Alaska. She opens the case files on Tom and begins to try to find his killers. She meets with Red and tells him she wants revenge for Tom's death.
99	10	"The Informant"	No. 118	Paul Holahan	Noah Schechter	January 10, 2018	6.16
A terrorist attack kills 57 people in a Toronto nightclub and the U.S. Treasury is preparing to freeze the assets of the group claiming responsibility. Red believes that a blacklister called the Informant is going to ransom the accounts to their holders. The Task Force locates the suspect, but a judge he claims he was having an affair with provides an alibi. Red goes to the Cayman Islands to identify the account holders. The Task Force follows the Informant, but Henry Prescott insists that Ressler stop the pursuit since the Informant is a client. Ressler arrests the Informant anyway, and Prescott threatens to reveal Ressler's culpability in Laurel Hitchin's death and manufactures evidence of Ressler's involvement in another murder. Red joins forces with Ressler and the two obtain Prescott's true identity after confronting the judge. Red and Ressler locate Prescott; Ressler considers killing him but arrests him instead. Ressler submits his resignation to Cooper, who rejects it. Red murders Prescott during transport. Liz comes out of hiding to continue her quest to find Tom's killers and identifies Navarro as one of Garvey's men. Liz learns more about Nik and Tom from Navarro and kills him after a brutal fight.
100	11	"Abraham Stern"	No. 100	Andrew McCarthy	Teleplay by : Jon Bokenkamp & John Eisendrath; Story by : Dave Metzger & Jon Bokenkamp	January 17, 2018	6.49
Reddington is robbed by an unknown assailant of the antique penny he took from Greyson Blaise. He maneuvers the Task Force into tracking down his assailant by identifying him as a blacklister looking for a secret cache of millions of dollars in Federal Reserve notes hidden by his father. Red believes that the penny is one of four that are key to locating the notes. Meanwhile, Liz sanitizes the scene of Navarro's death but leaves a bloody rag behind that is seized by police. Liz disposes of the body using the Stewmaker's method and discovers a high tech glass eye, but detective Singleton is now on her trail. The Task Force locates the final penny in a museum and Metro police impound it before blacklister Abraham Stern can steal it. Liz breaks into the Metro police evidence room with Glen's help and gives the penny to Red, who trades it to Stern for a share of the notes. Stern has a plan for them to break into the U.S. Mint in Denver where the notes are hidden, but he betrays Red and attempts to take the treasure for himself. However, Red anticipated Stern's treachery and steals the notes from Stern and traps him in the Mint for the FBI. Liz admits to Red that she offered to help so she could take the bloody rag from the Navarro case along with the penny to derail the murder investigation.
101	12	"The Cook"	No. 56	Solvan "Slick" Naim	Peter Noah	January 31, 2018	6.11
Red notifies the Task Force about a blacklister who murders by arson. The Task Force enlists imprisoned arsonist Earl Fagen's help with their investigation and he discovers hidden religious messages left at a crime scene. Aram locates the arsonist's home and Ressler and Samar try to question him, but he escapes. The Task Force identifies the arsonist as a priest of an obscure religious order. Ressler and Samar question the head of the order, who reveals that the priest had been expelled after admitting to having sexual desires for women he knew and fantasizing about burning them to death. The Task Force identifies his next intended victim and manage to prevent her death. The arsonist self-immolates after being confronted by the FBI. Liz continues to search for clues in Tom's death while avoiding Garvey and his men. With Reddington's help, she is able to use the glass eye's GPS tracking mechanism to locate a safe house filled with technology. Red says that he needs to keep the suitcase contents secret from her, but Liz vows to discover the truth.
102	13	"The Invisible Hand"	No. 63	Andrew McCarthy	Jonathan Shapiro & Lukas Reiter	February 7, 2018	6.35
Reddington nudges the Task Force into finding a blacklister group named "The Invisible Hand", which targets people who have committed acts that are legal but morally wrong and leave their bodies buried near a town named Brenford that has been abandoned due to the dumping of toxic waste. Ressler and Samar go to the site and discover a possible suspect. Meanwhile, the Hand picks as its next target Anna Hopkins, whom they hold responsible for the deaths in Brenford. At the same time, Reddington lends a hand to his associate Anthony after a drug dealer threatens to kill him. Singleton confronts Liz with his suspicions about Navarro's death after discovering the evidence is gone. In Tom's effects, Liz finds a key to a safe with a journal and a reference to the name Oleander, a suspected Russian spy. Liz goes to talk to Oleander, who is revealed to be Dominic, the father of Katarina Rostova and Liz's grandfather. The Task Force identifies Anna as the next victim of the Invisible Hand and show up just as the Hand is loading her into their vehicle. In the ensuing firefight, several members are shot and one is captured. She reveals that the Hand is taking Anna to Brenford to bury her alive for her actions. The Task Force prevent Anna's death and arrest the last surviving members. Red finds the eye's maker and discovers that the man who asked him to build it was a dirty cop. Liz, believing that official sanction is necessary to find Tom's killer, requests reinstatement to the Task Force.
103	14	"Mr. Raleigh Sinclair III"	No. 51	Christine Gee	Kelli Johnson	February 28, 2018	5.68
Reddington steers the Task Force into targeting a blacklister called The Alibi who helps clients get away with murder by tricking witnesses into providing rock solid alibis. Aram figures out that the witnesses are in fact seeing near-perfect doubles. Meanwhile, Liz begins to see therapist Dr. Sharon Fulton following Tom’s death in order to get reinstated as an FBI agent. Dr. Fulton insists upon speaking to Red, who reluctantly complies. The Task Force identifies one of the doubles, a homeless man named Kahil Shula who has disappeared. Red finds Shula's friend, who identifies the man who recruited him as Raleigh Sinclair III. Ressler and Samar locate Sinclair's workshop and evidence of his next target and manage to stop him from killing his ex-wife. Red warns Sinclair that the FBI is now looking for him and trades Sinclair's freedom for the evidence of his involvement in many murders, which is given to the Task Force. Liz takes Detective Singleton into her confidence and takes him to the Post Office to explain her involvement with Reddington.
104	15	"Pattie Sue Edwards"	No. 68	Donald Thorin, Jr.	Carla Kettner	March 7, 2018	5.69
The Task Force investigates an outbreak of a virulent pathogen at a Manhattan diner at Red's behest, and Aram identifies the culprit as a blacklister named Patricia Sue Edwards, a biochemist formerly with the U.S. Army Medical Research Institute for Infectious Diseases. Pattie Sue was widowed after her Navy SEAL husband was killed in Syria by another SEAL while allegedly smuggling opium. The Centers for Disease Control and Prevention quarantines the area, but their lead scientist discovers that their network has been brought down by a computer virus introduced by the pathogen. Aram determines that the intrusion enabled Pattie Sue to access the Department of Defense computers to find her husband's killer. Liz and Detective Singleton formulate a plan to draw out Tom's killer. Singleton identifies Garvey, but Garvey threatens Singleton's family and kidnaps him. Pattie Sue uses a biochemical weapon to infect the SEAL responsible for the death of her husband, but he subsequently infects her and inadvertently destroys the cure she's carrying. Ressler intercepts the pair while they're trying to get more of the cure and forces the SEAL to admit his involvement with the smuggling and exonerate Pattie Sue's husband. Meanwhile, Reddington deals with the threat of an Internal Revenue Service audit of his money laundering empire and employs Earl Fagen to burn down the IRS building with the problematic records. Singleton is found murdered and Liz recognizes Tom's killer Ian Garvey at the crime scene.
105	16	"The Capricorn Killer"	No. 19	Bill Roe	Taylor Martin	March 14, 2018	5.55
The discovery of a ritualistic killing crime scene causes FBI Agent Brandon Graves to request Liz's assistance with the investigation due to her profiling experience. Liz, Samar, and Graves interview the family of the deceased and discover that he was the Capricorn Killer, killed by a copycat in the same manner as his original crimes. The Task Force tracks down a possible address for the killer and finds the partially dismembered body of Tristate Butcher, also killed according to his own modus operandi. Dr. Fulton questions Liz about her investigations of serial killers, and Liz theorizes that the killer is an FBI profiler. The Task Force finds a witness to the murder of Detective Singleton and takes him into protective custody, where he identifies Garvey as the killer. Reddington confronts Garvey about the contents of the suitcase, but they're at a stalemate, both wanting to keep the truth hidden for now. Garvey insists that the witness not testify. Red vows that he will kill Garvey when he retrieves the bones. Aram leads the convoy transporting the witness, but the witness is taken by unknown gunmen. Liz identifies former Agent Hollins as a suspect and tracks him to a remote cabin, but Hollins captures Liz, and Dr. Fulton reveals her involvement with the deaths of the two serial killers. She offers Liz the chance to kill her first profile, the Sandman Killer. Liz considers it, but Ressler and Samar burst in and kill Hollins. Dr. Fulton flees; Liz finds her but lets her go. Dr. Fulton reinstates Liz as an agent and Liz lets Dr. Fulton know that she may call upon her later, following Red's example.
106	17	"Anna-Gracia Duerte"	No. 25	Michael Caracciolo	Lukas Reiter & Jonathan Shapiro	April 4, 2018	5.38
Jerry Jawal, a smuggler working for Ian Garvey and the Nash Syndicate, is murdered during an apparent robbery, so Red puts Liz and the Task Force on the case in order to recover a missing ledger, crucial evidence implicating Garvey. Ressler and Samar investigate and discover that Jawal's wife is a teenage child bride. Aram scans her computer and discovers that she has been in contact with other child brides, some of whom were freed from their marriages by an unknown killer. Liz and Aram figure out that the men who took their witness work for Red. Liz confronts Red, who insists that he must keep his secret. Liz and Aram get a tip about where the witness is located, but it's a trap and they barely escape Garvey’s men. Samar and Ressler identify the killer's next target and manage to save him. The assassin is revealed to be Anna-Gracia Duerte, another child bride victim. Samar finds her and convinces her to turn herself in. Red and Liz locate the ledger with Anna-Gracia’s help and Samar gets her a reduced sentence. Meanwhile, Aram considers a step forward in his relationship with Samar.
107	18	"Zarak Mosadek"	No. 23	Terrence O'Hara	Sean Hennen	April 11, 2018	5.15
A young man is kidnapped on a Paris street. Red has identified Zarak Mosadek as Ian Garvey's supplier from the ledger, and the Task Force determines that the young man is Mosadek's son and that Mosadek will be in Paris to negotiate his release. In an attempt to apply pressure to Garvey, Red and the Task Force head to Paris and capture Mosadek with an elaborate ruse. Distrustful of Red's agenda, Liz goes after Garvey on her own. She and Aram waylay the head of Internal Affairs to steal files from an investigation into Garvey to look for clues. They follow Garvey to a bar in Baltimore and observe him meeting a woman named Lillian Roth. Red bargains with Mosadek to cut off Garvey’s supply in exchange for his help getting his son back unharmed. Mosadek agrees and goes to exchange diamonds for his son, but he is taken by the kidnappers. Red and the Task Force chase them down and rescue Mosadek and his son. Red instructs Mosadek to set up a meeting with Garvey. Liz meets with Lillian and reveals the details of her investigation to get Lillian to turn against Garvey. Roth reveals that her real name is Jennifer Reddington and she is the daughter of Raymond Reddington.
108	19	"Ian Garvey: Conclusion"	No. 13	Cort Hessler	Carla Kettner & Katie Bockes	April 25, 2018	5.24
Red gets Zarak Mosadesk to stop supplying drugs to Garvey until he turns over the bones. However, Mosadek and Garvey have already secretly agreed to kill Reddington once he shows up at the meeting. Liz tries to get Lillian to betray Garvey, but she refuses. Liz surreptitiously plants a listening device on Lillian before she leaves. Liz meets with Red, who reveals his intention to get the bones and again tells Liz that the bones are none of her business. Aram learns from the listening device about the plan to betray Red. Red summons Raleigh Sinclair III to create another double as part of his plan. Red goes to the meet and Garvey pulls a gun and kills Mosadek instead of Red and quickly flees. Garvey wakes up in Red’s captivity and learns that Red kidnapped him long before the meet and that Sinclair had arranged for Tony Pagliaro to double for Garvey at the meet. Garvey reluctantly agrees to lead Red and Dembe to the bones, but he crashes their car and escapes. Garvey, Liz, and Red all converge on Lillian's bar, where a shootout leaves Garvey near death and Red seriously wounded. Liz and Lillian accompany Garvey to the hospital, but he expires without revealing the truth. Meanwhile, Aram and Samar are near a breakup.
109	20	"Nicholas T. Moore"	No. 110	Solvan "Slick" Naim	Jon Bokenkamp & Lukas Reiter	May 2, 2018	5.54
Liz visits Red during his recovery from being shot and sees him apparently hiding a news item. The Task Force begins to investigate the discovery of a young girl found alone in a forest. The girl is suffering from leukemia but shows no signs of any treatment by modern medicine. Liz and Samar interview the girl, who insists that everyone from the outside her town is infected by a deadly pathogen. The girl is kidnapped from the hospital by a fake orderly and when Samar tries to stop it, she is knocked out and captured. The Task Force connects the girl to a Nicholas T. Moore, the writer of the post-apocalyptic novel "The Age of Contagion", who also lived in the area. Red uses the diversion created by the investigation to interview Garvey's henchman Judson, and determines that the bones were transported to Costa Rica. Red defends his actions to Lillian, who reveals that her mother has passed away. At his compound New Haven, Moore orders the girl to be fatally purified by fire. The Task Force appears in time to save the girl, but the inhabitants of New Haven retreat indoors. Aram, desperate to find Samar, risks his life to show the inhabitants the novel and tells them that their isolation is based on a work of fiction. Some inhabitants try to leave, but Moore turns violent. The Task Force captures him, but Samar is nowhere to be found.
110	21	"Lawrence Dane Devlin"	No. 26	Bethany Rooney	Carla Kettner & Sean Hennen	May 9, 2018	4.96
Samar has been captured by Nicholas T. Moore's fixer and killer for hire, and her life is in danger. Aram bargains with Moore about the identity of the fixer and gives him his personal Bible for the name of his intermediary, Julius Hannelore. Moore commits suicide with a cyanide pill hidden in the book. Red meets Hannelore and extorts him into providing the name of the fixer, Lawrence Dane Devlin. Devlin is preparing to dispose of Samar, but she manages to injure Devlin and cause the van transporting them both to crash, trapping them in the van with serious injuries. Red and Smokey's search for the duffel bag leads them to an underground auction in Costa Rica, but they find that Garvey has already given them to Sutton Ross, an old enemy of Red's whom Red believed to be dead. Devlin escapes the van, but is killed by a bear and the van rolls into a river with water streaming in. The Task Force finds Devlin's hideaway, but not Samar. Aram frantically searches for her and manages to rescue her from the now-underwater van, but she’s comatose. Liz follows Red to Costa Rica and learns about the bag transfer. Liz tells Red that she also knows who has the bones and vows to recover them before Red does.
111	22	"Sutton Ross"	No. 17	Bill Roe	John Eisendrath & Jon Bokenkamp & Lukas Reiter	May 16, 2018	5.18
Sutton Ross stages a daring robbery to get information about a revolutionary robotics discovery by noted scientist Ravi Desai. Aram determines that Desai himself is necessary to utilizing the data, so the Task Force immediately sets about keeping Desai out of Ross’s hands. Red tracks down Ross through his tailor, but they are both too late and Ross captures Desai. Liz and Red both give chase, but Liz crashes her car and Red stops the pursuit to help her. The Task Force deduces Ross’s sales contact, and Ressler shows up in his stead. The Task Force takes down Ross and his men after getting Desai to safety. During the interrogation, Liz and Ross talk about the bag, while Red threatens to end his cooperation with the Task Force if Cooper doesn't help him get the bones. Ross takes Liz hostage and flees the Post Office. Ross demands that Red surrender in exchange for Liz’s freedom, and Red agrees. Ross captures Red and tries to force him to reveal the truth about the bones while torturing Liz. The Task Force busts in, captures everyone, and frees Liz. Red takes the bag and kills Ross on his way out. He destroys the bones to hide the truth, but Liz is revealed to have been working with Ross and Jennifer Reddington all along to learn the truth about the bones: they belong to the real Raymond Reddington. The person known as Raymond Reddington is in fact an imposter. Samar awakes from her coma and accepts Aram's proposal.

== Reception ==
=== Ratings ===
No.	Title	Air date	Ratings/Share (18–49)	Viewers (millions)	DVR 18–49	DVR Viewers (millions)	Total 18–49	Total viewers (millions)
1	"Smokey Putnum (No. 30)"	September 27, 2017	1.1/4	6.39	0.8	3.322	1.9	9.710
2	"Greyson Blaise (No. 37)"	October 4, 2017	1.0/4	5.87	0.7	3.221	1.7	9.093
3	"Miss Rebecca Thrall (No. 76)"	October 11, 2017	1.0/4	5.79	0.7	3.047	1.7	8.839
4	"The Endling (No. 44)"	October 18, 2017	0.9/3	5.46	0.8	3.102	1.7	8.565
5	"Ilyas Surkov (No. 54)"	October 25, 2017	0.8/3	5.23	0.7	3.061	1.5	8.292
6	"The Travel Agency (No. 90)"	November 1, 2017	0.9/3	5.25	0.7	2.855	1.5	8.015
7	"The Kilgannon Corporation (No. 48)"	November 8, 2017	0.9/3	5.04	—N/a	3.130	—N/a	8.171
8	"Ian Garvey (No. 13)"	November 15, 2017	0.9/4	5.89	0.7	2.903	1.6	8.796
9	"Ruin"	January 3, 2018	1.0/4	6.02	—N/a	2.951	—N/a	8.975
10	"The Informant (No. 118)"	January 10, 2018	1.0/4	6.16	0.8	3.216	1.8	9.372
11	"Abraham Stern (No. 100)"	January 17, 2018	1.1/4	6.49	0.7	3.029	1.8	9.517
12	"The Cook (No. 56)"	January 31, 2018	1.0/4	6.11	0.9	3.248	1.9	9.350
13	"The Invisible Hand (No. 63)"	February 7, 2018	1.0/4	6.35	0.7	3.032	1.7	9.384
14	"Mr. Raleigh Sinclair III (No. 51)"	February 28, 2018	0.9/4	5.68	0.8	3.322	1.7	9.008
15	"Pattie Sue Edwards (No. 68)"	March 7, 2018	1.0/4	5.69	0.7	3.098	1.7	8.797
16	"The Capricorn Killer (No. 19)"	March 14, 2018	0.9/4	5.55	0.6	2.948	1.5	8.495
17	"Anna-Gracia Duerte (No. 25)"	April 4, 2018	0.9/4	5.38	0.6	2.887	1.5	8.271
18	"Zarak Mosadek (No. 23)"	April 11, 2018	0.8/4	5.15	0.6	2.964	1.4	8.116
19	"Ian Garvey: Conclusion (No. 13)"	April 25, 2018	0.8/3	5.24	0.5	2.681	1.3	7.922
20	"Nicholas T. Moore (No. 110)"	May 2, 2018	0.8/4	5.54	—N/a	2.690	—N/a	8.214
21	"Lawrence Dane Devlin (No. 26)"	May 9, 2018	0.8/3	4.96	0.6	2.546	1.4	7.502
22	"Sutton Ross (No. 17)"	May 16, 2018	0.8/3	5.18	0.5	2.639	1.3	7.822

=== Critical response ===
The fifth season of The Blacklist received positive reviews from critics. The review aggregator website Rotten Tomatoes reports a 100% approval score based on five reviews, with an average rating of 8.5/10.
