= Milagro (The X-Files) =

- The X-Files episode
- Phillip Padgett rips out his own heart. To mimic a beating heart, the cast used air pumps to rapidly inflate and deflate the prop.
- Episode no.: Season 6 Episode 18
- Directed by: Kim Manners
- Story by: John Shiban; Frank Spotnitz
- Teleplay by: Chris Carter
- Production code: 6ABX18
- Original air date: April 18, 1999
- Running time: 45 minutes

Guest appearances
- John Hawkes as Phillip Padgett; Nestor Serrano as Ken Naciamento; Angelo Vacco as Kevin; Jillian Bach as Maggie

Episode chronology
← Previous "Trevor"	Next → "The Unnatural"
- The X-Files season 6

"Milagro" is the eighteenth episode of the sixth season of the American science fiction television series The X-Files. It originally aired on the Fox network on April 18, 1999. The episode's teleplay was written by Chris Carter from a story by John Shiban and Frank Spotnitz, and directed by Kim Manners. The episode is a "Monster of the Week" story, unconnected to the series' wider mythology. "Milagro" earned a Nielsen household rating of 9, being watched by 15.2 million people upon its initial broadcast. The episode received mixed to positive reviews from television critics.

The show centers on FBI special agents Fox Mulder (David Duchovny) and Dana Scully (Gillian Anderson) who work on cases linked to the paranormal, called X-Files. Mulder is a believer in the paranormal, while the skeptical Scully has been assigned to debunk his work. In this episode, Mulder and Scully investigate a series of murders in which the heart has been removed from the victims. A writer who lives next door to Mulder is writing a novel about the murders before they actually happen and soon, Scully finds herself confused and drawn to the writer, who has a romantic interest in her.

"Milagro" was inspired by the idea of someone thinking of something so much that it becomes a reality, a topic Shiban later noted was "familiar" to anyone who had written a script. The part of Phillip Padgett had been written specifically for the actor John Hawkes. In addition, the production for "Milagro" was decidedly low-budget due to its "intimate and personality-driven" nature. The episode's title means "miracle" in Spanish. The episode has been analyzed for its use of symbolism, its exploration of motive, and the role reversal of Mulder and Scully.

== Plot ==
Phillip Padgett (John Hawkes), a fledgling author and the neighbor of Fox Mulder (David Duchovny), has a vision in which he pulls his heart out from his chest; later, he also sees a beating heart inside an incinerator. Meanwhile, Dana Scully (Gillian Anderson) visits Mulder to discuss a case, and along the way, she encounters Padgett. The case the agents are investigating involves a victim's whose heart was removed without physical evidence, leading Mulder to believe it is a case of psychic surgery. During Mulder and Scully's conversation, Padgett is shown secretly listening in on them.

Later, a teenager named Kevin is murdered and his heart removed, all while Padgett transcribes the event elsewhere. Scully receives an anonymous milagro pendant and Padgett's narration of her own private thoughts. When she later encounters Padgett at a church, he admits to sending the pendant and discusses the Sacred Heart of Jesus with her. Mulder discovers Padgett's manuscript and arrests him because of how accurately it describes the murders. However, when another victim is killed in the same manner, and Mulder releases Padgett from custody, hoping he will lead the agents to the killer.

Back at his apartment, Padgett encounters Ken Naciamento (Nestor Serrano), a Brazilian surgeon from Padgett's novel who, through a mysterious connection between Padgett and his writing, has seemingly come to life and started committing murder. Realizing that his novel foretells Scully's murder, Padgett attempts to destroy it in the incinerator, but Mulder mistakes believes he is trying to destroy evidence. Meanwhile, Naciamento attacks Scully; Mulder soon finds her covered in blood but alive, while Padgett lies dead on the basement floor in front of the incinerator, his beating heart in his hand, having "... given what he could not receive".

== Production ==
=== Writing and casting ===
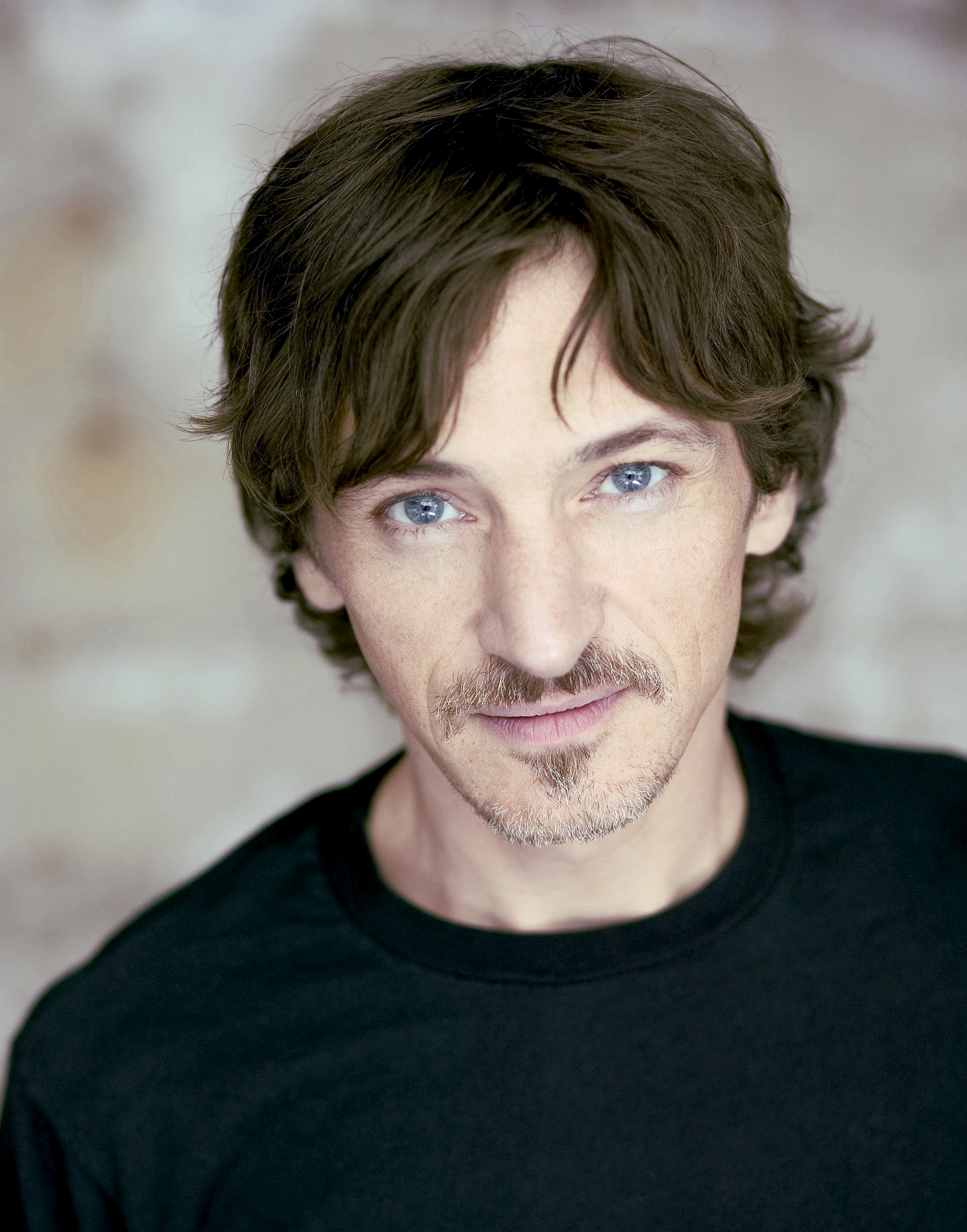
The part of author Phillip Padgett was written for John Hawkes, who was chosen for his "dignity and simplicity".

The idea behind the episode occurred when John Shiban and Frank Spotnitz were discussing how stressful being an X-Files writer could be. The episode's theme of someone thinking of something so much that it becomes real was "familiar" to anyone who had written a script, Shiban later explained. Shiban and Spotnitz created a rough draft for the episode and then sent it to series creator Chris Carter, who was busy shooting the pilot for the new television series Harsh Realm. Carter re-wrote portions of the script, including the ending, to show that the writer, although confused, does indeed "have love in his heart".

Spotnitz later called the episode "personal". He noted that the cards that hang on Padgett's wall were put up to emulate the original writing style of The X-Files, saying, "The cards that are on the writer’s wall are the same format that we wrote The X-Files in. We would use those same cards when figuring out stories for the series." Spotnitz wrote the notes himself "because the prop guy couldn’t do it as well as we could because that’s really the way we did it. It’s a very emotional love story and it’s really about our love for these characters as writers". The writers eventually settled on the title of "Milagro," which means miracle in Spanish.

Several weeks before production of "Milagro" began, John Hawkes had auditioned for the part of Pinker Rawls in the episode "Trevor". Both Chris Carter and Frank Spotnitz felt that Hawkes was not right for the part; however, they believed he possessed a "dignity and simplicity", and so they wrote the part of Philip Padgett specifically for him, as they believed his acting would prevent the main character in "Milagro" from becoming a one-dimensional, stock villain.

=== Filming and effects ===
The production for "Milagro" was decidedly low-budget due to its "intimate and personality-driven" nature. Director Kim Manners sought to film most of the episode "very simply", because he wanted "the characters to carry it". Manners wanted to frame the opening scene in a way that told "the story […] in a series of images", and so, he utilized quick cuts between shots. Many of the scenes, such as the opening pan, were created by means of a crane shot.

The sequence in which Mulder runs was shot on a motorcycle; the production staff decided to use motorcycles because Duchovny had been able to outrun two horses in the fourth-season episode "Tunguska". Several locations that were scouted for the episode proved difficult to use. Two churches that had been selected for the episode rescinded filming permission just before production commenced, requiring the location scouts to find replacements as quickly as they could. The scenes in the woods were filmed at Griffith Park in Los Angeles because of its many pine trees. Due to the fact that the actual park is rather sparsely populated by brush, the foliage was all created by the crew of the series. Manners shot several of the forest scenes with a 200 millimeter lens to obscure the lights of Los Angeles in the distance. Padgett's furnace was filmed on a set called the "red/blue room". It had originally been created for the sixth-season opener "The Beginning". The jail set was constructed in a large warehouse by a different production company. The X-Files rented the space for several days for filming, for five thousand dollars. Finding a graveyard with "old-fashioned vertical tombstones" proved a challenge for locations manager Ilt Jones. Eventually one was found in Altadena, California. The fog in the cemetery was created by burying small "misters" that produced water vapor. Because the vapor was cold, it hugged the ground, emulating the properties of actual fog.

The sequence in which Padgett rips his heart out was created with a rubber heart. The blood that leaks from Padgett's chest was added to "hide the fact that [the crew was] doing a little sleight of hand". The image of the beating heart in the furnace was created by overlapping a shot of a fake beating heart and a shot of actual fire. The two were then merged in post-production by animator John Wash, because the fire would have melted the actual heart model. The hearts of Naciamento's victims were created via a pump that was operated off-screen. The actual milagro prop was crafted several times because, according to Manners, the face was particularly difficult to get right. In fact, the second time the medallion appears in the episode, it is a different prop.

=== Music and cultural references ===
For his score, Mark Snow incorporated human heartbeats so as to complement the themes of the episode. During the graveyard scene, one of the tombstones is marked "Salinger," with the names "Nicholas" and "Diana" visible underneath, a reference to the parents of Charlie, Bailey, Julia, Claudia, and Owen in the Fox television series Party of Five. The date on the tombstone reads 1994, the date the series premiered. P.K. Simonds, writer and executive producer for the show was initially unaware that the tombstone made an appearance. Others, including Spotnitz, had believed the tombstone to be a joking reference to famous author J.D. Salinger.

== Themes ==
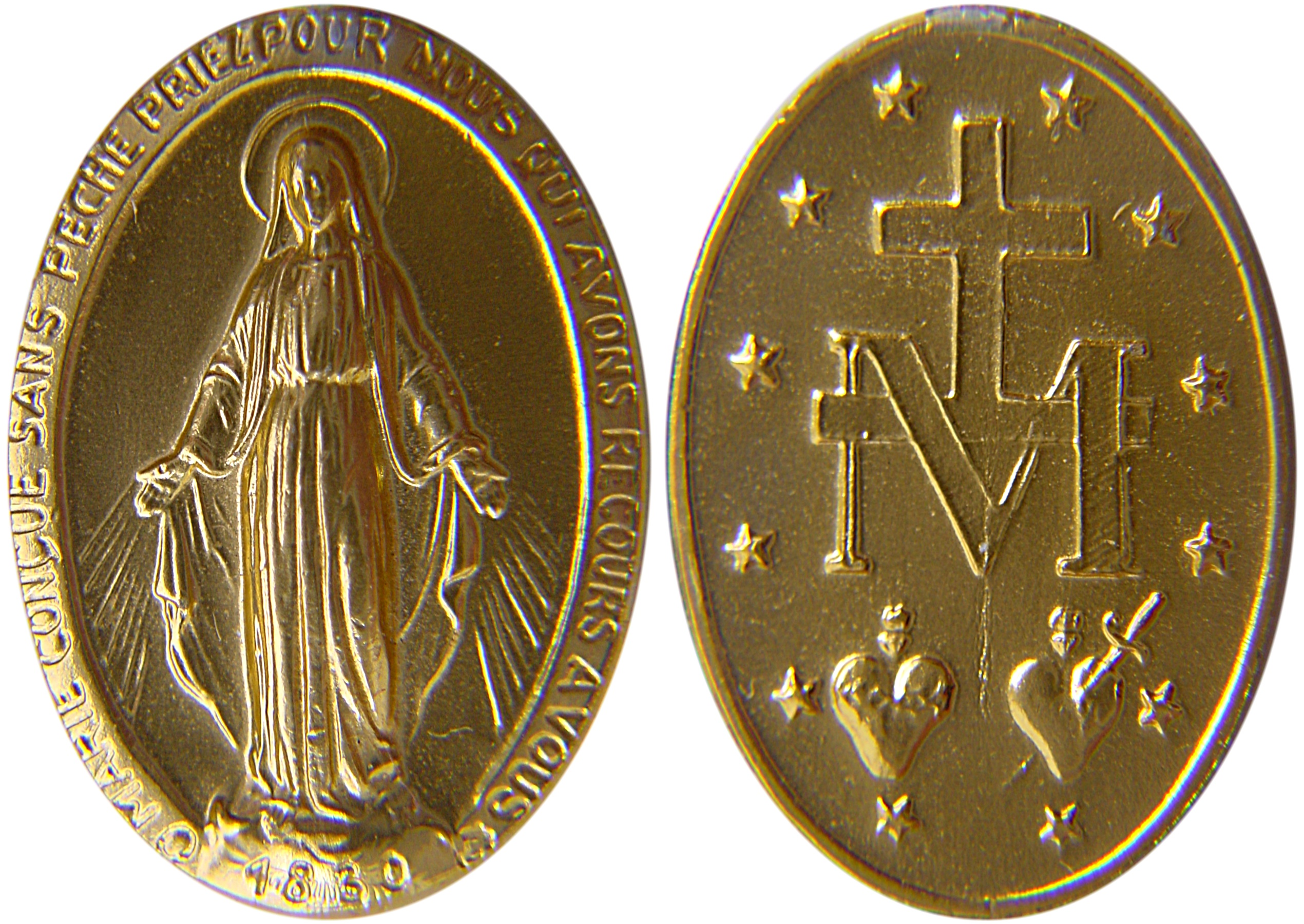
A medallion featuring the Sacred Heart; the symbol serves an important part in the episode.

Margaret Kaner, in the book The X-Files and Literature, notes that, instead of merely utilizing symbolism, "Milagro" makes "symbolism as a subject". Kaner points out that the Christian symbol of the burning human heart is infused into the episode in a variety of different ways—hearts are both removed from human victims, as well as burned in furnaces. The episode's plot and the Christian symbol are connected when Padgett leaves Scully the milagro charm.

The concept of motive is also explored. When confronting Padgett, Mulder asks him why he is murdering his victims. Padgett, in turn, admits that he cannot answer the question. Kaner suggests that Padgett is representative of a version of Mulder, and that there is a direct parallel between being a criminal profiler—who must think like the criminal—and a writer—who must think like his characters. In the end, however, Padgett sacrifices his personal quest—his manuscript—in order to be free. This presents a distinct contrast to Mulder, who will never truly give up his obsession. Michelle Bush, in her book Myth-X, writes that the episode sheds light on Scully's motive throughout the series: she wants to gain Mulder's attention, something she feels she does not have. Padgett eventually realizes this, and sacrifices himself for her love.

The episode also presents a temporary role reversal for Mulder and Scully. When discussing the lack of evidence at the crime scenes, Scully says that "a crime is only as perfect as the man […] Even if he made not one mistake, there still is a motive. If you find his motive, you find the murderer". Kaner argues that this logic is more in line with what Mulder has subscribed to throughout the series. Furthermore, after Mulder discovers Padgett's manuscript, he arrests him "without a second thought". By relying on empirical logic, Mulder is acting in the way Scully normally thinks.

== Reception ==
=== Ratings ===
"Milagro" first aired in the United States on April 18, 1999. This episode earned a Nielsen rating of 9, with a 14 share, meaning that roughly 9 percent of all television-equipped households, and 14 percent of households watching television, were tuned in to the episode. It was viewed by 15.2 million viewers. The episode aired in the United Kingdom and Ireland on Sky1 on June 27, 1999, and received 0.85 million viewers, making it the second most watched episode that week.

=== Reviews ===
"Milagro" received mixed to positive reviews from critics. Tom Kessenich, in his book Examination: An Unauthorized Look at Seasons 6–9 of the X-Files gave the episode a positive review, writing "The power of ['Milagro's] revelations was stunning. As was the episode." Robert Shearman, in his book Wanting to Believe: A Critical Guide to The X-Files, Millennium & The Lone Gunmen, rated the episode five stars out of five, calling it "a study of overwriting with all the mistakes left in" and "one of the most remarkable" episodes of the series. Shearman also felt that Anderson's performance was "revelatory", and he praised guest star Hawkes as "both sinister and sympathetic". The character of Ken Naciamento has been listed as one of the best guest roles of the series, with TV Guide and UGO Networks both listing him amongst the greatest monster-of-the-week characters in The X-Files.

Zack Handlen gave the episode a "B−" and wrote that it "works far better than it deserves to", due largely to the performance of Hawkes and the "bat shit weirdness" of the plot. He was particularly critical of the "self-serious" and "pompous" tone of the episode. Handlen concluded that the episode was "like watching someone's fan fiction getting brought to life". He did, however, write that "there is something strangely fascinating about" the premise; in particular, he was pleased with the conclusion, calling it the moment when "things pick up". Paula Vitaris from Cinefantastique gave the episode a negative review and awarded it one-and-a-half stars out of four. Vitaris, despite noting the potential in the episode's theme of the relationship between writer and their characters, felt that "Milagro" betrayed Scully's personality and featured her doing things that were out of character.

Kim Manners was pleased with the episode; he noted that he "felt it was a very interesting character study". He later called it "one of my favorite episodes". Frank Spotnitz considered "Milagro" to have been an "underappreciated" episode. For this reason, it was later included on the X-Files Essentials DVD compilation, along with seven other episodes. Handlen argued that the episode reduces Scully "to a victim waiting to find out which handsome man will rescue her". Elyce Rae Helford, in her book Fantasy Girls: Gender in the New Universe of Science Fiction and Fantasy Television, accused the show of "reinforc[ing] the stereotype […] of independent women as lonely, neurotic, and nostalgic for sexual attention from men." Anderson herself felt that the character needed to "loosen up". She was once approached by a fan who applauded Scully as the "epitome of womanhood" because she is a character who "not only can kick ass but she […] works with Mulder without jumping him". Anderson, in return jokingly replied, "So the epitome of womanhood is sexual restraint? […] I don't think so." The episode was particularly analyzed by fans of the show, and the fact that Scully was almost seduced provoked "lively internet discussion".

== Work cited ==
- Bush, Michelle (2008). Myth-X. Lulu. ISBN 9781435746886.
- Helford, Elyce Rae (2000). Fantasy Girls: Gender in the New Universe of Science Fiction and Fantasy Television. Rowman & Littlefield. ISBN 9780847698356.
- Kaner, Margaret (2007). "Believing the Lie". In Yang, Sharon (ed.). The X-Files and Literature: Unweaving the Story, Unraveling the Lie to Find the Truth. Cambridge Scholars Publishing. ISBN 9781847182395.
- Kessenich, Tom (2002). Examination: An Unauthorized Look at Seasons 6–9 of the X-Files. Trafford Publishing. ISBN 9781553698128.
- Manners, Kim (2005). ""Milagro": Commentary". The X-Files: The Complete Sixth Season (DVD). 20th Century Fox Home Entertainment.
- Meisler, Andy (2000). The End and the Beginning: The Official Guide to the X-Files Season 6. HarperCollins. ISBN 9780061075957.
- Shearman, Robert (2009). Wanting to Believe: A Critical Guide to The X-Files, Millennium & The Lone Gunmen. Mad Norwegian Press. ISBN 9780975944691.

This article incorporates material derived from the "Milagro" article on the X-Files wiki at Fandom (formerly Wikia) and is licensed under the Creative Commons Attribution-Share Alike 3.0 License (January 1, 2012).
