= List of unmade episodes of The X-Files =

There were several scripts written for The X-Files that were never made.

During the nine-year original run of the American science fiction television program The X-Files, a number of stories were proposed but, for a variety of reasons, never fully produced. Below is a list of unmade episodes which were submitted by recognized professional writers, but were not filmed or aired.

Abandoned episode scripts have been discovered from eight of the series' eleven seasons, while several others have been documented that were intended for unspecified seasons. The reasons for the episodes' stagnation include the Fox network rejecting ideas, budget-related problems and stories evolving into later-made episodes. In addition, several episode ideas were developed but were completely scrapped after the show's producers did not show any interest.

The plots of the unmade episodes vary, with many of the proposed entries involving a theme of ghosts. In many cases, according to executive producer Frank Spotnitz, elements of unmade episodes were adapted, or were moved from one episode—or in one case, franchise—to another. For example, a fifth-season episode involving an atheist hearing the voice of God was developed into "Kitsunegari", and the proposed story "Flight 180", written by Jeffrey Reddick was re-written and released as the popular 2000 horror film Final Destination.

== Season 1 ==
"Dark He Was and Golden-Eyed"

After the success of the series' first monster-of-the-week episode, "Squeeze", Doug Hutchison, who portrayed the episode's antagonist Eugene Victor Tooms, wrote a prequel to the episode entitled "Dark He Was and Golden-Eyed" and sent it to series creator Chris Carter. Hutchison reportedly loved his role and "was adamant about coming back on the show". However, the script was returned unread for legal reasons. Hutchison's version of Tooms differed significantly from episode writers Glen Morgan and James Wong’s character. Hutchison later explained that he envisioned Tooms as "an experiment to find out how I could remain so young and immortal; he was infused with a drug that backfired and ended up escaping [an] asylum. So now he’s eating livers like M&Ms – he’s on a rampage!" The script further revealed that Tooms was the incarnation of "a ravenous, liver-eating Central American Indian God", and it would have culminated in a confrontation between Tooms and Dana Scully.

== Season 2 ==
Alternative "Little Green Men" story

Originally, the season two premiere "Little Green Men" was supposed to be written by Chris Carter. In the rough draft of this version, Fox Mulder would have been sent to Moscow. However, Carter ran out of time to create his episode and, instead, asked Morgan and Wong to write the season opener.

== Season 4 ==
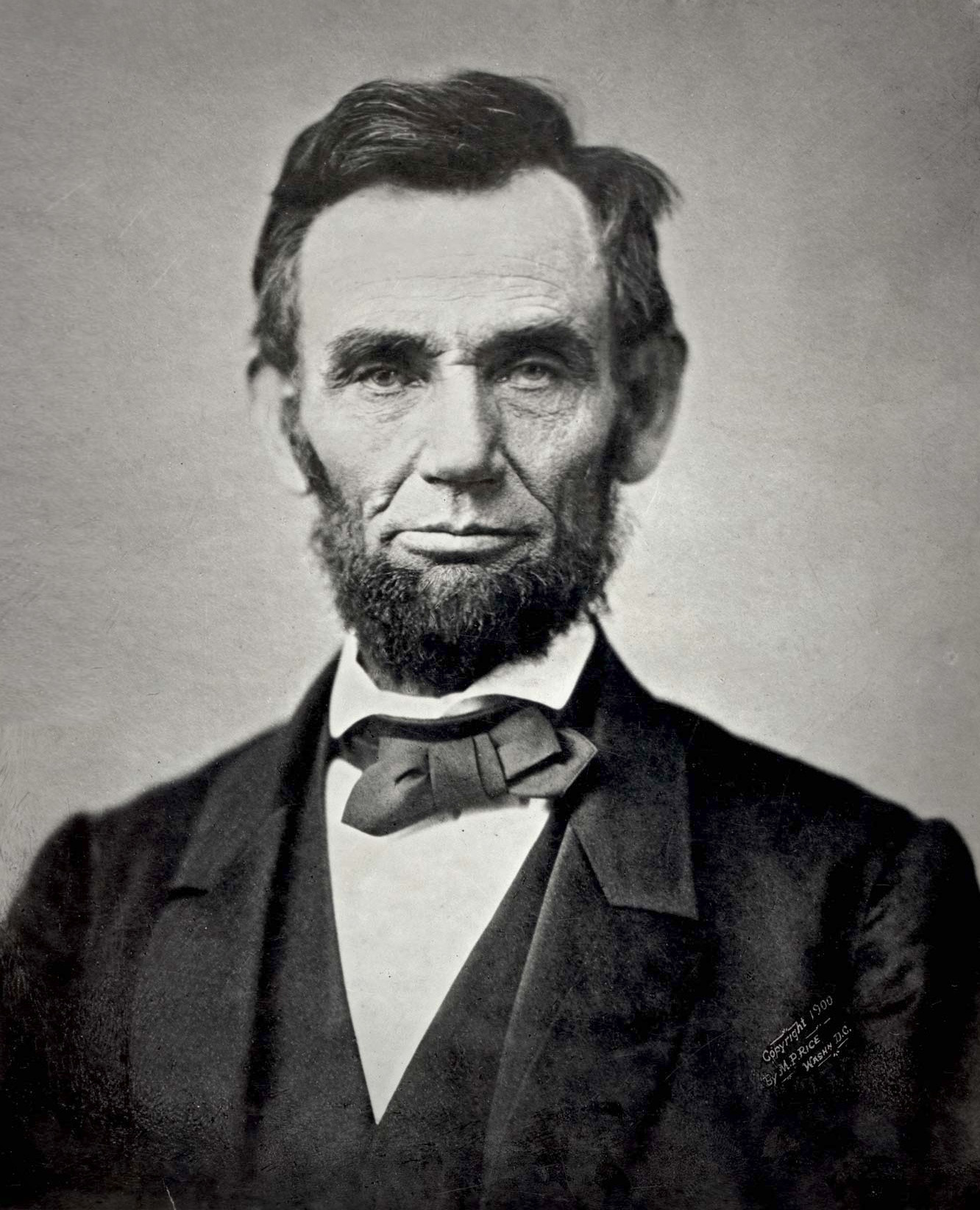
Morgan and Wong planned to write an episode about Abraham Lincoln's ghost, but the episode idea was scrapped.

Untitled story about Abraham Lincoln's ghost

During the middle of season four, Morgan and Wong started to write their fourth and final episode for the season before moving on to helm the show's sister series, Millennium. The story the two developed was a "sort of Abraham Lincoln’s ghost in the White House type of thing". Both writers had desired to write a story where Lincoln's ghost haunts the White House and Mulder and Scully investigate. Morgan explained that he had "done a lot of research and I had always wanted to write a feature about Lincoln’s ghost". However, due to the massive amounts of rewrites the two were forced to do for "Musings of a Cigarette Smoking Man", both Morgan and Wong lost interest in the story. Morgan explained, "I felt they didn’t want my heart and soul anymore, so I wouldn’t give this one to them". The two later crafted "Never Again" in its place. Years later, Frank Spotnitz said that he "always wondered about" the story and what the finished product would have been like.

== Season 5 ==
Original version of "Christmas Carol"

During the second week of October 1997, David Duchovny was scheduled to be away from Vancouver for promotional purposes for the movie Playing God. The producers decided to develop a Scully-centric episode that could be filmed the week Duchovny would be away. With the episode scheduled to air during December, Vince Gilligan, John Shiban, and Frank Spotnitz initially tried writing a Christmas episode that put Dana Scully into a situation similar to that of Scrooge in the 1951 British version of A Christmas Carol, starring Alastair Sim. The episode was later completely re-written.

Untitled religion story

Tim Minear pitched an idea for an episode that followed an incarcerated atheist who, while in prison, would have heard the voice of God, commanding him to kill a truly evil man. The prisoner was to then be mystically transferred out of the prison, prompting a police manhunt; only Mulder would have believed that the man was working for the greater good. Per Minear: "I pitched [the story] and I was going to do it, eventually, until we found ourselves at a point in the year where we needed a script really fast". Executive producer Frank Spotnitz suggested to Minear that the "convicted atheist" should actually be Robert Modell from the third season episode "Pusher", whereupon the script was completely re-written into "Kitsunegari".

"Unsolved Mysteries" episode

Vince Gilligan developed a cross-over idea while writing an episode during the fifth season; the script would have involved a story being presented by Robert Stack of the NBC show Unsolved Mysteries, with unknown actors playing Mulder and Scully. This script was later aborted, and Gilligan directed his attention towards writing the episode "Bad Blood".

== Season 6 ==
Untitled Tilt-A-Whirl story

Vince Gilligan proposed a story idea featuring a man holding an individual hostage on a Tilt-A-Whirl. Gilligan pitched this idea at several meetings and it soon became a recurring joke. Most of the comments Gilligan received noted that his premise lacked an explicit mystery to investigate and so Gilligan decided that after the ride was shut off, the man's head would explode. This idea later evolved into "Drive".

Untitled gold mine story

David Amann, after writing his first episode "Terms of Endearment", proposed a story that involved a monster loose in an abandoned gold mine. Frank Spotnitz, the show's executive producer, did not particularly like the idea of a gold mine, but he enjoyed the concept of a monster loose in an enclosed space. The episode was soon completely re-written into "Agua Mala"

Untitled dog stories

Jeffrey Bell developed two separate stories that both evolved into the episode "Alpha". The first was going to be a "reversal" of 1963 movie The Incredible Journey, featuring "a desperate family [that] moves three thousand miles to get away from their killer pet—who's waiting for them at their new house, really pissed". The second story idea would feature a child who released his anger through the dogs at a local animal shelter. In this version, the dogs functioned as a manifestation of the child's id. Bell scrapped both of these ideas because they lacked "really cool visuals".

== Season 7 ==
Night of the Living Dead remake

Reportedly, Stephen King, who had penned season five's "Chinga", wished to write an episode based on George A. Romero's cult 1968 zombie film Night of the Living Dead. In addition, Romero was slated to direct the episode. According to Spotnitz, the staff of The X-Files met with both King and Romero and the two showed an interest in producing the episode. Initially, the episode was slated for the seventh season, but it never came to fruition. The season's fourth episode, "Millennium", did however, deal with zombies.

Untitled time story

Chip Johannessen, who had formerly been an executive producer on the Carter-created television series Millennium, wrote a draft for The X-Files in which the episode's main antagonist was a prisoner with the ability to stop time. Executive producers Carter, Frank Spotnitz, and John Shiban found the episode's premise promising, with Carter arguing that it bore stylistic similarities to the first season episode "Beyond the Sea". The idea eventually morphed into the script for "Orison".

== Season 8 ==
Untitled Mulder abduction story

After the partial departure of Duchovny, Carter decided to focus almost solely on the character of John Doggett during the first half of the season. Duchovny was unhappy because the show never fully examined Mulder's abduction properly. Reportedly, Duchovny offered to write and direct an episode based around the concept of Mulder being trapped in the alien spaceship, as seen in the season opener "Within" and "Without". Carter, however, nixed the idea because "it was not about Doggett".

== Unspecified season ==
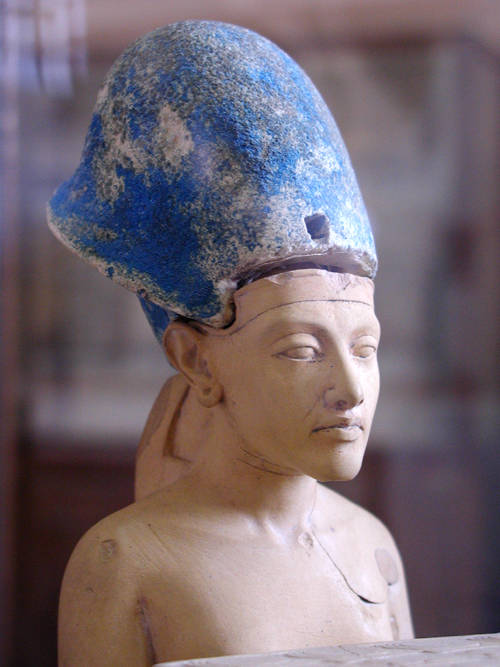
D.W. Paone wrote an episode about ancient Egyptian pharaoh Akhenaten, who, in the script, was an alien.

Untitled tomb story

James Wong, during an interview to promote The LAX-Files book, revealed that the writers for The X-Files had an idea for "a story about tombs", but Fox "refused [to consider] the [idea]."

Untitled abortion story

James Wong, during an interview to promote The LAX-Files book, revealed that staff writers Howard Gordon and Alex Gansa had an idea for a story involving abortion, but Fox "refused [to consider] the [idea]", much like the tomb story. Carter, in a separate interview with Newsweek later claimed that the show was not "looking to press the limits of anything that is a more hot-button topic, for example, abortion".

"The Song of the Sun"

Law & Order cameraman D.W. Paone, a fan of the series from its first broadcast, wrote and submitted a freelance script during its early seasons, co-written with author Frank Scoblete. Paone and Scoblete's script dealt with the ancient astronaut theory, and was concerned with the Egyptian Pharaoh Akhenaten, who, in their script, was presented as an alien who returned to Earth once again in the year 1995. Paone had chosen to focus on Akhenaton due to his own interest in Egyptology, and was confident that Scoblete's dialogue was true to the series' characters. Although they were able to submit the script due to an acquaintance with producer Daniel Sackheim, it was later rejected by the show's producers for being too expensive to produce on an episodic television budget.

"Flight 180"

Screenwriter Jeffrey Reddick wrote a spec script for The X-Files in order to get an agent in 1994. He said, "I was actually flying home to Kentucky and I read this story about a woman who was on vacation and her mom called her and said 'Don't take the flight tomorrow, I have a really bad feeling about it'. She switched flights and the plane that she would have been on crashed. I thought, that’s creepy—what if she was supposed to die on that flight?" Reddick's script featured Scully's younger brother, Charles, having a premonition of his flight crashing, which prompts Mulder and Scully to investigate the event. While Reddick never submitted the spec script to The X-Files, it was revamped by Reddick as a feature, and coincidentally, X-Files vets James Wong and Glen Morgan were brought on as writers/director and the project became the 2000 horror film Final Destination. Reddick later presented the script to horror website Bloody Disgusting, which uploaded it onto their website on June 16, 2015.

"Crampton"

In 1998, Thomas Ligotti and Brandon Trenz submitted a script in which an FBI agent is assassinated by a man who transforms into a mannequin, leading Mulder and Scully to follow a trail of clues to the sinister backwater town of Crampton. The script culminates in the agents witnessing a black void of meaninglessness behind a curtain at a magic performance. Although Ligotti and Trenz later reworked the script into a feature film unrelated to The X-Files, the two eventually abandoned the idea due to being unable to find backing for the film. A draft of the script was later published online.
