= The Blacklist season 4 =

The Blacklist
- Season 4
- Season 4 DVD cover
- No. of episodes: 22

Release
- Original network: NBC
- Original release: September 22, 2016 – May 18, 2017

Season chronology
- ← Previous; Season 3 Next → Season 5

The fourth season of the American crime thriller television series The Blacklist premiered on NBC on September 22, 2016. The season was produced by Davis Entertainment, Universal Television and Sony Pictures Television, and the executive producers are Jon Bokenkamp, John Davis, John Eisendrath, John Fox, and Joe Carnahan. The season consisted of 22 episodes and concluded on May 18, 2017.

== Overview ==
The fourth season resolves the question of Alexander Kirk's (Ulrich Thomsen) relationship to Elizabeth Keen (Megan Boone). Kirk discovers that Liz is not his daughter and abandons his obsession with winning her trust and loyalty. Reddington (James Spader) attempts to kill Mr. Kaplan (Susan Blommaert) for her efforts in hiding Liz and her baby from him, but Mr. Kaplan survives the attack and begins exposing the trail of dead bodies left by Reddington’s criminal activities. Mr. Kaplan attempts to dismantle Reddington’s organization. FBI Agent Julian Gale (Enrique Murciano), the former partner of Donald Ressler (Diego Klattenhoff) on the Reddington Task Force, is assigned to the Reddington investigation and Gale tries to use Mr. Kaplan's knowledge to bring down Reddington. The final episodes reveal the existence of a suitcase containing human bones of unknown origins that figure prominently in the next season.

== Cast ==
=== Main cast ===
- James Spader as Raymond "Red" Reddington
- Megan Boone as Elizabeth Keen
- Diego Klattenhoff as Donald Ressler
- Ryan Eggold as Tom Keen
- Harry Lennix as Harold Cooper
- Amir Arison as Aram Mojtabai
- Mozhan Marnò as Samar Navabi
- Hisham Tawfiq as Dembe Zuma

=== Recurring ===
- Susan Blommaert as Kathryn Nemec/Mr. Kaplan, Reddington’s cleaner.
- Ulrich Thomsen as Alexander Kirk/Konstantin Rostov, the man who claims to be Liz's father.
- Deirdre Lovejoy as Cynthia Panabaker
- Christine Lahti as National Security Advisor Laurel Hitchen
- Enrique Murciano as FBI investigator Julian Gale
- Clark Middleton as DMV employee Glen Carter
- Fisher Stevens as Marvin Gerard, Reddington’s personal attorney.
- Leon Rippy as the Hunter, a loner who saves Mr. Kaplan.
- Lotte Verbeek as Katarina Rostova, a spy and the mother of Agent Keen.
- Matt Servitto as Sebastian Reifler, a doctor treating Alexander Kirk.
- Raoul Trujillo as Mato, a hitman employed by Alexander Kirk.
- Annie Heise as Elise/Janet Sutherland, an operative/hacker dating Aram.

== Episodes ==
No. overall	No. in season	Title	Blacklist guide	Directed by	Written by	Original release date	US viewers (millions)
68	1	"Esteban"	No. 79	Michael Watkins	Jon Bokenkamp, John Eisendrath	September 22, 2016	6.40
Held captive in Cuba by Alexander Kirk, Liz refuses to believe that he is her father. She fails in her attempts to escape. Raymond Reddington tries to rescue Liz after learning he had been betrayed by Mr. Kaplan, who collaborated with Tom to convince Red and the others that Liz was dead. Tom and Agnes, who have also been captured by Kirk's men, are driven to a remote location where Tom is separated from Agnes. The task force feels shock and betrayal upon learning that Liz is alive. Reddington makes contact with Esteban, a blacklister working with the CIA, and strikes a deal for Liz's location in Cuba, but he arrives too late to save her. After digging his own grave in the jungle, Tom overpowers the man hired to kill him. Reddington rescues Agnes, but bounty hunter Mato, hired by Kirk, disappears with Agnes after smashing into Reddington's car and knocking out its passengers.
69	2	"Mato"	No. 66	Andrew McCarthy	Daniel Cerone	September 29, 2016	5.99
Kirk takes Liz to Nova Scotia, which he claims is her childhood home. At the house, Liz has a memory of her mother, Katarina Rostova. Reddington tracks down Mato with Mr. Kaplan's help and uncovers Liz's location before killing him. Reddington alerts the task force, leading the FBI to their house to rescue Liz, but Kirk escapes with Agnes. Reddington shoots Mr. Kaplan for her betrayal. However, as Reddington and Dembe leave, they fail to notice Mr. Kaplan's hand moving.
70	3	"Miles McGrath"	No. 65	John Terlesky	Lukas Reiter	October 6, 2016	6.41
Reddington says criminal incubator Miles McGrath is the key to finding Kirk and Agnes. Liz apologizes to the task force for faking her death. Samar requests a transfer. Tom and Liz work to get information about Kirk from the FBI. Liz finds her mother's journal, which describes her affair with Reddington. Katarina was assigned to seduce and betray Reddington. Kirk wants a sample of the Roboski virus, which will help him treat his rare blood disease. Reddington and Tom hope to get to McGrath by Tom working undercover with McGrath's mercenaries to hijack a train carrying the Roboski virus. The task force arrests McGrath and his mercenaries after they complete the job. Reddington takes the Roboski virus sample. Kirk tells Liz that a stem cell donation from her will allow him to live. Mr. Kaplan is alive and a hunter finds her.
71	4	"Gaia"	No. 81	Bill Roe	Peter Noah	October 13, 2016	5.85
Reddington enlists the help of Liz and the task force to find Kirk by hunting an eco-terrorist named Gaia. Kirk allows Liz and Tom to see Agnes through a video feed. Tom calls a friend to track the video feed. Tom fails, causing Kirk to end the feed. Liz is furious with Tom for not trusting her judgment. Gaia wants to cause an explosion at a nuclear plant in retaliation for radiation poisoning that he suffered during his military service that affected his child. Cooper shuts off Gaia's helicopter causing it to crash and killing Gaia. Kirk knows he is dying from his blood disease but is hesitant to use Agnes to help himself because it might kill her. Gaia's son has the same doctor as Kirk, and Reddington captures the doctor to get to Kirk. Mr. Kaplan discovers she has been chained by the hunter who is caring for her injuries.
72	5	"The Lindquist Concern"	No. 105	Kurt Kuenne	Dawn DeNoon	October 20, 2016	5.32
The Lindquist Concern is employed by corporations to prevent revolutionary technology from reaching the market and damaging their businesses. Tom asks for Ressler's help in getting info on Kirk. The task force discovers patent office employee Silas Gouldsberry, who secretly works for the Lindquist Concern killing inventors and taking their discoveries. Reddington uses Dr. Reifler to track Kirk. Tom blackmails a Russian intelligence operative to obtain info on Kirk's location and discovers that Kirk has set a trap for Reddington. Tom gives Liz a DNA test that identifies Kirk as her father and tips off Liz about the trap. The task force corners Gouldsberry at his office, where he plans to release information on the inventions he has stolen. Samar stops Gouldsberry and prevents the release. Reddington extracts information about a patent by Sonia Bloom. Reddington tries to capture Kirk's car using Dr. Reifler's connection, but the car blows up. Liz's call saves Reddington's life. Liz confronts Reddington about his lies.
73	6	"The Thrushes"	No. 53	Terrence O'Hara	Teleplay by : Daniel Knauf; Story by : Daniel Knauf, Dave Metzger	October 27, 2016	5.52
The task force discovers that financier Rene LeBron is bankrolling Kirk's operations. They capture LeBron, but during his transfer he is assassinated by unknown gunmen. Reddington reveals to the task force that their communications are monitored by Kirk. Liz is torn between Reddington and Kirk, whom she believes is her father. Reddington questions the validity of the DNA test. Aram deduces that the task force network could have been penetrated only by someone with his access. The task force focuses on The Thrushes, one of Kirk’s groups that specializes in hacking the most secure networks. Suspicion falls on Aram's girlfriend, Elise. The task force creates a trap to locate The Thrushes. Elise discovers the ruse and attacks Aram before she is captured by the task force. Liz leads Kirk into a trap. Agnes is rescued and Kirk is captured. Mr. Kaplan tries to convince the hunter to allow her to leave.
74	7	"Dr. Adrian Shaw"	No. 98	Andrew McCarthy	Chap Taylor	November 3, 2016	5.45
Kirk collapses during his transfer and is hospitalized. Unless compatible stem cells are donated, Kirk will die. Reddington attempts to find Sonia Bloom, a research scientist specializing in blood, to lure The Coroner, who establishes new identities for criminals. When her partner is murdered by the Lindquist Concern, Bloom changes her name to Dr. Adrian Shaw. Her work with blood connects her to Kirk. Tom tries to convince Liz not to donate stem cells to Kirk. The task force locates Shaw and boards the ship where her clandestine laboratory is based, but Shaw is gone. Reddington took Shaw to his laboratory for her help. After having her blood tested to check for compatibility, Liz discovers she is not Kirk's daughter and tells him so, but Kirk believes Reddington tampered with the results. Reddington tells Liz that Kirk has men coming to get him out of the hospital.
75	8	"Dr. Adrian Shaw: Conclusion"	No. 98	Michael Watkins	Daniel Cerone	November 10, 2016	5.87
Kirk's men break him out of the hospital and capture Liz after a firefight. Tom pursues them but is unable to help Liz and is nearly captured before Ressler saves him. Mr. Kaplan escapes her shackles. Reddington has Dr. Shaw identify patient zero, Lucille Bockes, whose life was saved by Adrian's treatment, which means Reddington has the cure for Kirk. Kirk's own people confirm that Liz is not his daughter. Reddington offers to trade himself for Elizabeth and he is taken to Kirk. Liz is supposed to be released, but Kirk's assistant Odette tries to kill Liz, who escapes. Kirk tortures Reddington and asks if Liz is Reddington's daughter. Reddington says she is. Dr. Reifler and Lucille Bockes arrive to show Kirk that treatment is possible, but Kirk refuses to take the cure. He prepares to kill Reddington, but Reddington whispers a secret to him that stops Kirk from killing him. Kirk disappears and Reddington returns to see Liz and Agnes.
76	9	"Lipet's Seafood Company"	No. 111	Don Thorin	Teleplay by : Dawn DeNoon; Story by : Lukas Reiter, Dave Metzger	January 5, 2017	5.21
A seafood processing plant, which is being used as a secret smuggling operation by a member of the New Martyrs Brigade, is attacked and technology is stolen. Reddington puts the task force on the New Martyrs Brigade and the attack. Aram attends a deposition regarding his former girlfriend Elise who hacked the FBI and is cleared as a person of interest. The New Martyrs Brigade send Farook al-Thani from Libya to finish the project and find out who attacked them. A high-ranking member of Blackthorn Kincaid, an American business, is supplying the New Martyrs with the classified technology, a timing chip. The task force is given a possible suspect, James Maddox by Mr. Deavers, an executive of Blackthorn Kincaid, but Maddox is being set up. It is revealed that Samar was working with the Mossad and her ex-lover Levi Shur and she led the raid. Samar is captured by al-Thani, but Mossad and the FBI team up to stop the terrorists and rescue Samar. Aram rescinds his dinner date with Samar, citing issues of trust. Reddington calls in a favor with president-elect Senator Robert Diaz and gets Liz pardoned. Liz is returned to Special Agent status.
77	10	"The Forecaster"	No. 163	Edward Ornelas	Kim Newton	January 12, 2017	5.34
The task force takes a case involving a young girl, Maggie Driscoll, who has premonitions of crimes that have yet to be committed. It is revealed that Maggie's hearing aid picks up a criminal's murder plans that are used to affect companies' stock prices. Reddington plays off two businessmen, Iniko and Keino, against each other, pretending to work with the other. After Iniko kills his employee, Reddington reveals that Iniko killed one of his friends two months ago. Reddington kills Iniko and hires Iniko's cleaners. The plotters realize that Maggie knows their plans and try to kill her. Ressler stops them from harming Maggie and manages to kill the murderer Ben Charnquist, but Chris Farnsworth, the stock trader and criminal behind the plots, gets away. Dembe, worried about Reddington's actions, seeks out Liz hoping she can reach him. He reveals that Reddington killed Mr. Kaplan. Tom tries to get into living a normal life, but he reveals to Liz that he has reservations that he can leave his former life behind.
78	11	"The Harem"	No. 102	Bill Roe	Marisa Tam	January 19, 2017	5.01
On the advice of Reddington, Liz infiltrates a heist group composed entirely of women to retrieve a list of individuals in witness protection. One of the group, a former British agent named Emma Knightly, had ties with Reddington but has gone silent. Emma wants to get out of the game and warns Liz not to remain involved with Reddington. Emma protects Liz from coercion by the group's leader, Margot Rochet. Emma betrays the group during the heist and escapes with the list. One of the group is killed and Liz narrowly escapes. Emma gives Reddington the list and he agrees to get her out of the life of crime. Liz tips off the authorities to Margot's whereabouts and she is captured. Liz confronts Reddington about Mr. Kaplan's death. Reddington reveals that he went after the list because Mr. Kaplan's sister is on it and he wanted to protect her. One of Reddington's main accountants turns up dead and Reddington suspects that someone is attacking his organization.
79	12	"Natalie Luca"	No. 184	Michael Watkins	Noah Schechter	February 2, 2017	5.05
In a flashback to 14 years earlier to Moldova, it is revealed that a young girl is afflicted with a deadly, highly infectious disease. She becomes an unaffected carrier of the disease, which is instantly fatal to those who come in contact with her. Coming back to contemporary times, this girl -- now in her late teens or early 20s -- poses as a masseuse to kill Reddington's accountant. Reddington asks the task force to find out who did it and why. The task force looks at similar deaths and identifies the woman as Natalie Luca. Natalie has been targeting people with money in order to finance the research that her boyfriend Malik Roumain is conducting to replicate her immunity from the disease so they can be together. Hawthorne Biologics is after her so they can use her as a biological weapon. Reddington recruits Tom to draw out his rival Baldur Magnusson to see if he is the one attacking Reddington's organization, but Baldur says he isn't after Reddington. Natalie and Malik plan one last job, but the task force intervenes and while fleeing, Malik is killed by Hawthorne agents. Natalie and Malik get their first kiss before he dies. Aram takes a pay cut so Samar can make as much money as he does. Tom and Liz talk about loving each other and staying together. Meeting with Luca, Reddington learns that his accountant was killed under the directive of Isabella Stone.
80	13	"Isabella Stone"	No. 34	Andrew McCarthy	Taylor Martin	February 9, 2017	4.91
Isabella Stone conducts covert campaigns to destroy the public image of the people she is hired to attack. Isabella and her crew continue to go after the members of Reddington's organization. They frame Reddington's ally Stratos Sarantos for the murder of his wife and get him thrown in a Monaco jail. Reddington and Dembe try to rescue Saranatos from prison, but Sarantos is mortally wounded during the escape. Sarantos insists that Reddington and Dembe leave him behind. The task force tracks down Isabella, who is scheming to plant evidence that Dr. Justin Sperry, a paraplegic philanthropist whose foundation had received donations from Reddington, is secretly smuggling money for Reddington. The task force captures Isabella, but she refuses to reveal her employer. She is placed on a prison transport, but Reddington's operatives intercept the transport and take Isabella. Tom searches through his past after learning his father was killed in an airplane crash.
81	14	"The Architect"	No. 107	Christine Gee	Chap Taylor, Dave Metzger	February 16, 2017	4.76
Harold is incensed after discovering that Reddington kidnapped the task force's prisoner and insists that Reddington provide information on a blacklister. Aram is ordered to go undercover at a hacker convention to track down the Architect, a man who plans and executes perfect crimes. Aram quickly locates the convention, where he encounters his ex-girlfriend Janet, who has been hired by the NSA to go after the Architect. After demonstrating his hacking skills, Aram is captured by the Architect so he can help him free Lonnie Perkins, a white supremacist, from prison. The plan to attack the prison proceeds with Aram's help, but Aram secretly signals the task force and Ressler and Samar arrive just in time to stop Perkins from escaping. The Architect flees but Aram blows up his vehicle with a rocket. Tom discovers that the man who said he killed Tom, aka Christopher Hargrave, as a child was given a script by the man's mother to admit it. She does not know who sent the $100,000 or why. Reddington discovers that Isabella Stone was hired by funds coming from his own accounts.
82	15	"The Apothecary"	No. 59	Michael Caracciolo	Teleplay by : Marisa Tam; Story by : Brian Studler	February 23, 2017	4.98
Reddington awakens in a hospital bed and discovers that he has been poisoned and may only have hours to live. Dembe is nowhere to be found. Reddington believes that one of his 11 closest associates betrayed him. Reddington believes that the Apothecary is the only person who could have concocted the lethal agent and he asks the task force for their help finding him. Liz and Ressler try to find the Apothecary while Reddington retraces his steps alone, trying to reconstruct the events of the previous night. Reddington is fading in and out of consciousness but he learns that his attorney Marvin Gerard did not appear at the meeting of his associates and that Marvin was leaving the country. A wine bottle sent by Marvin appears to be the method of poisoning. The task force finds the Apothecary and convinces him to provide the antidote to spare him the death penalty. Reddington is cured but the Apothecary doesn't know who hired him. Liz reveals that the laboratory testing showed that the poison was not in the wine, but in his scotch. Dembe is now the prime suspect.
83	16	"Dembe Zuma"	No. 10	Jean de Segonzac	Brandon Margolis, Brandon Sonnier	April 20, 2017	4.88
Reddington continues to search for the person responsible for trying to take down his criminal empire. Aram has resumed his relationship with Janet. Dembe kidnaps Aram to help him find out who really poisoned Reddington. Aram and Dembe work together to identify the attacker and eventually come up with a name: Kathryn Nemec, who Dembe knows as Mr. Kaplan. The task force tries to arrest Dembe, but he flees with Aram's help. Liz and Reddington find Dembe through his family and a former associate of Reddington's. Dembe goes to the site of Mr. Kaplan's shooting and discovers that she is still alive. The hunter who saved Mr. Kaplan then shoots Dembe, but Reddington arrives to save him. Reddington tries to get the hunter to give up Kate, but the hunter blows his place up and Reddington narrowly escapes death. Meanwhile, Samar continues to struggle with her feelings for Aram when she discovers that he is back with his spy girlfriend.
84	17	"Requiem"	None	Terrence O'Hara	Daniel Cerone	April 20, 2017	4.90
Mr. Kaplan crosses the country collecting all the bodies she had cleaned up for Reddington in order to expose his crimes and destroy him. In flashbacks to the 1960s, '70s, '80s, a young Mr. Kaplan, known as Kathryn Nemec, is hired by Liz's mother, Katarina Rostova, to be Liz's caretaker. Kate learns about Katarina's relationship with Reddington and that he believes that Liz is his child. After a fire breaks out, Katarina is forced to run, and Kate is given instructions to give Liz to Sam Milhoan to raise. Kate disappears to Texas, where she falls in love with Annie Kaplan, a woman who works at a bail bonds agency. One night at Annie's workplace, an angry customer kills Annie and shoots Kate (whom the customer calls "Mr. Kaplan"). Kate survives but is left with a metal plate installed in her head. After she recovers, Reddington asks Kate to work for him and help protect Liz. She says that she will always pick Liz if the choice is between the two. In the present, Reddington calls Mr. Kaplan to arrange a meeting. Mr. Kaplan refuses, vowing instead to get revenge on him and bring him down.
85	18	"Philomena"	No. 61	Michael Watkins	Peter Noah	April 27, 2017	4.86
Mr. Kaplan publicly reveals the 86 bodies that she has unearthed, triggering an investigation into the task force's relationship with Reddington led by FBI Agent Julian Gale. Julian and Ressler formerly worked together on a task force assigned to capture Reddington, so Julian asks Ressler for his help with the investigation. Julian states his belief that Reddington had someone on the inside and that Liz is the inside person. Julian begins identifying the bodies and accurately re-constructs the murder of Diane Fowler. Mr. Kaplan meets with Liz and reveals that she cared for her as a child and that the authorities have incriminating information on Reddington, trying to drive a wedge between Liz and Reddington, but Liz won't disavow Reddington. It is revealed that Mr. Kaplan has hired Philomena, a bounty hunter, to track down and capture Reddington's associates, including Marvin Gerard. Philomena captures Marvin but he will not betray Reddington, so Mr. Kaplan turns him over to the police with information about his connections to Reddington. Julian finds a fingerprint on a piece of evidence that has been overlooked, but Ressler is unable to tie the evidence to Reddington, leaving Julian suspicious. Reddington apologizes to a recovering Dembe, but Dembe refuses to leave. Philomena reveals where Mr. Kaplan is headed.
86	19	"Dr. Bogdan Krilov"	No. 29	Don Thorin	Teleplay by : Lukas Reiter, John Eisendrath, Jon Bokenkamp; Story by : Brian Studler, Marisa Tam	May 4, 2017	4.82
Reddington gets wind that Mr. Kaplan is going after Dr. Bogdan Krilov, the man who manipulated Liz's memories years ago. The task force tries to find Krilov while Reddington searches for Mr. Kaplan in Vienna. Ressler gets a call about a witness in the Reven Wright murder case, only to be ambushed by Bogdan and his accomplices on Mr. Kaplan's orders. Liz and Samar find and seize Krilov's mind-manipulating equipment. Mr. Kaplan directs Krilov to steal the equipment of Dr. Orchard, who restored Liz's memories. Ressler confronts Laurel Hitchin, believing that she has kidnapped the only witness to her involvement in Reven's death, but Liz shows up just in time to reveal to him that he was being manipulated by Krilov. Ressler doesn't shoot Hitchin, but he is arrested. In Vienna, Mr. Kaplan reveals to one of Reddington's associates Red's involvement in his son's death. Reddington reluctantly kills his associate with the help of another loyal associate. Reddington and Dembe manage to escape, trying to keep up with Mr. Kaplan. Liz discovers that Krilov has manipulated her memories again very recently at Reddington's behest. Meanwhile, Liz is forced to meet with Julian, who has discovered the truth about Reddington's crimes.
87	20	"The Debt Collector"	No. 46	Bill Roe	Teleplay by : Kim Newton, Daniel Cerone; Story by : Jon Bokenkamp, Lukas Reiter	May 11, 2017	4.87
The task force discovers that a mercenary called The Debt Collector has been hired to capture Liz. Reddington asks Mr. Kaplan to put their differences aside when trying to prevent Liz from being kidnapped. Mr. Kaplan agrees to examine a body from a suspected previous killing by The Debt Collector to look for clues. Julian continues his investigation into the 86 bodies and Cooper orders Ressler to work with Julian. Mr. Kaplan finds evidence that suggests that a criminal from Liz's past put out the job on her. The Debt Collector captures Liz before the task force can protect her. Reddington resolves to finish his war with Mr. Kaplan regardless of the cost. Mr. Kaplan discovers Liz's location and appears with her hired guns. Reddington turns up and kills The Debt Collector and reveals that he hired him to kidnap Liz to trap Mr. Kaplan. Reddington offers Mr. Kaplan a truce but she refuses. The FBI appears and a three-way standoff occurs. Julian follows Ressler to the standoff and shoots at Reddington but misses. Mr. Kaplan escapes during the confusion.
88	21	"Mr. Kaplan"	No. 4	Don Thorin	Teleplay by : John Eisendrath; Story by : Lukas Reiter, J. R. Orci	May 18, 2017	4.94
Reddington's associates are leaving him as Mr. Kaplan cleans out his accounts of the funds that pay them. Aram is called in to testify about his involvement with Reddington and the task force. He is granted immunity and cannot refuse to testify. Julian tells Ressler he knows about Reddington. Mario Dixon was hired by Mr. Kaplan to get documents on Reddington that illustrate his signed immunity deal with the Department of Justice. Reddington captures Mario, but Mario makes a deal with Reddington to give him Mr. Kaplan. Reddington gets the info on Mr. Kaplan and then kills Mario. Reddington visit Dom, Liz's grandfather, to retrieve an item and reveals that Liz is alive. Reddington goes to Mario's meeting with Mr. Kaplan to offer her a chance to live by going into exile on a paradise island. She refuses and Julian shows up to capture Reddington, who escapes. Mr. Kaplan accepts capture and tells Julian she will testify in open court.
89	22	"Mr. Kaplan: Conclusion"	No. 4	Michael Watkins	Teleplay by : Jon Bokenkamp, John Eisendrath, Daniel Cerone; Story by : Lukas Reiter, J. R. Orci	May 18, 2017	4.92
Mr. Kaplan reveals the details surrounding the 86 bodies. Reddington wants to find Henry Prescott, who has Reven Wright's body. Aram testifies without revealing Reddington's crimes, saying he is proud of the work done with Reddington, which gets him put in jail. Samar finds out that Aram's girlfriend, Janet, testified for the grand jury and gave them Aram's name. Cooper submits Reddington's DNA sample to find out if he is Liz's father. Reddington and Ressler find Reven's body in Prescott's custody. Despite knowing that Laurel Hitchin killed Reven, they use the incriminating bullet from Reven's body to force Hitchin to derail the grand jury inquiry by claiming national security concerns. Liz, not knowing the grand jury has ended, contacts Mr. Kaplan to get her to stop. The two go on a drive to get the answers, but before Mr. Kaplan can reveal the truth about Reddington, Reddington's men show up. Mr. Kaplan kills herself so her contingency plan will activate and the truth about why Reddington revealed himself to Liz will be revealed. Ressler accidentally kills Hitchin when meeting her to get his FBI credentials back. Liz reveals she already tested Reddington's DNA two weeks after he showed up but was too afraid to look at the result. Aram gets out of jail and Janet confesses she revealed his name, causing him to leave Janet and confess his feelings for Samar. Liz finds out that Reddington is her father and confronts him. Tom gets a suitcase containing a skeleton, presumably confirmation that Reddington killed Katarina. Reddington tells Dembe that they need to find the suitcase before Liz finds out anything.

== Reception ==
The fourth season of The Blacklist received positive reviews from critics. The review aggregator website Rotten Tomatoes reports an 90% approval score based on ten reviews, with an average rating of 7/10. The consensus reads: "Propelled by the sheer force of James Spader's performance (and a pretty killer soundtrack), The Blacklist's fourth season ups the ante and then some".

=== Ratings ===
No.	Title	Air date	Ratings/Share (18–49)	Viewers (millions)	DVR 18–49	DVR Viewers (millions)	Total 18–49	Total viewers (millions)
1	"Esteban (No. 79)"	September 22, 2016	1.3/5	6.40	1.4	5.261	2.7	11.658
2	"Mato (No. 66)"	September 29, 2016	1.1/4	5.99	1.3	4.686	2.4	10.680
3	"Miles McGrath (No. 65)"	October 6, 2016	1.2/4	6.41	1.2	4.786	2.4	11.064
4	"Gaia (No. 81)"	October 13, 2016	1.1/4	5.85	1.2	4.795	2.3	10.648
5	"The Lindquist Concern (No. 105)"	October 20, 2016	1.1/4	5.32	1.2	4.891	2.3	10.209
6	"The Thrushes (No. 53)"	October 27, 2016	1.2/4	5.52	1.1	4.573	2.3	10.088
7	"Dr. Adrian Shaw (No. 98)"	November 3, 2016	1.1/4	5.45	1.1	3.43	2.2	9.792
8	"Dr. Adrian Shaw: Conclusion (No. 98)"	November 10, 2016	1.2/4	5.87	1.2	4.733	2.4	10.597
9	"Lipet's Seafood Company (No. 111)"	January 5, 2017	1.0/4	5.21	1.1	4.342	2.1	9.552
10	"The Forecaster (No. 163)"	January 12, 2017	1.0/4	5.34	1.1	4.391	2.1	9.732
11	"The Harem (No. 102)"	January 19, 2017	1.0/4	5.01	1.0	4.317	2.0	9.330
12	"Natalie Luca (No. 184)"	February 2, 2017	0.9/3	5.05	1.0	4.282	1.9	9.328
13	"Isabella Stone (No. 34)"	February 9, 2017	0.9/3	4.91	1.0	4.307	1.9	9.219
14	"The Architect (No. 107)"	February 16, 2017	0.9/3	4.76	0.9	4.219	1.8	8.977
15	"The Apothecary (No. 59)"	February 23, 2017	0.9/3	4.98	1.0	3.947	1.9	8.925
16	"Dembe Zuma (No. 10)"	April 20, 2017	0.9/4	4.88	0.8	3.468	1.7	8.348
17	"Requiem"	April 20, 2017	0.8/3	4.90	0.9	3.674	1.7	8.575
18	"Philomena (No. 61)"	April 27, 2017	0.8/3	4.86	—	—	—	—
19	"Dr. Bogdan Krilov (No. 29)"	May 4, 2017	0.8/3	4.82	1.0	3.834	1.8	8.645
20	"The Debt Collector (No. 46)"	May 11, 2017	0.8/3	4.87	0.9	3.832	1.7	8.698
21	"Mr. Kaplan (No. 4)"	May 18, 2017	0.9/4	4.94	0.7	3.285	1.6	8.157
22	"Mr. Kaplan: Conclusion (No. 4)"	May 18, 2017	0.9/4	4.92	0.9	3.705	1.8	8.596
