= Arcadia (The X-Files) =

- The X-Files episode
- Episode no.: Season 6 Episode 15
- Directed by: Michael Watkins
- Written by: Daniel Arkin
- Production code: 6ABX13
- Original air date: March 7, 1999
- Running time: 45 minutes

Guest appearances
- Peter White as Gene Gogolak; Abraham Benrubi as Big Mike; Tom Gallop as Win Shroeder; Marnie McPhail as Cami Shroeder; Debra Christofferson as Pat Verlander; Tim Bagley as Gordy; Tom Virtue as Dave Kline; Juliana Donald as Nancy Kline; Mark Matthias as Mover

Episode chronology
← Previous "Monday"	Next → "Alpha"
- The X-Files season 6

"Arcadia" is the fifteenth episode of the sixth season of the American science fiction television series The X-Files. It premiered on the Fox network on March 7, 1999. The episode was written by Daniel Arkin and directed by Michael Watkins. The episode is a "Monster-of-the-Week" story, unconnected to the series' wider mythology. "Arcadia" earned a Nielsen household rating of 10.5, being watched by 17.91 million people in its initial broadcast. The episode received mostly positive critical reception, with many reviewers praising the episode's humor.

The show centers on FBI special agents Fox Mulder (David Duchovny) and Dana Scully (Gillian Anderson) who work on cases linked to the paranormal, called X-Files. Mulder is a believer in the paranormal, while the skeptical Scully has been assigned to debunk his work. In this episode, several disappearances at an idyllic planned community lead Mulder and Scully to go undercover as a married couple. They find that the members of the community strictly abide by every single subdivision rule, no matter how inconsequential a rule may seem. What Mulder and Scully soon discover is that the ruler of this small community has enforced his rule with a Tulpa creature from Tibet.

Arkin, a first-year staff writer for the show, was inspired to write the episode based on an incident in his life that involved a planned community. The episode heavily utilized special effects, with various make-up and digital effects inserted into the final film to give the episode an appropriate feel.

== Plot ==
At the Falls of Arcadia, a planned community in San Diego County, California, homeowner Dave Kline receives a tacky whirligig, which he puts on his roof to annoy his neighbors. That night, a mysterious creature attacks and kills Kline and his wife. Fox Mulder (David Duchovny) and Dana Scully (Gillian Anderson) investigate the Klines' disappearance, posing as married homeowners Rob and Laura Petrie.

After Mulder puts up a basketball hoop, his new neighbor Win Shroeder warns him that it violates the community's CC&Rs. Later, after the agents find what appears to be blood on a ceiling fan, another one of their neighbors, Mike Raskub, tries to warn them about the "consequences" of breaking the rules. Elsewhere, Homeowner association president Gene Gogolak calls Mike "a weak link," and that night, a creature attacks him.

Suspecting that residents who violate the CC&Rs are being targeted, Mulder deliberately breaks the rules, placing a plastic flamingo in his yard and putting out his basketball hoop after dark. Meanwhile, Scully's analysis reveals that the "blood" she and Mulder had discovered is actually grime from an old landfill from beneath the development. Believing the missing residents may be buried underground, Mulder excavates the Klines' yard and finds the whirligig they received before their deaths, which bears a label from Gogolak's company.

Mulder realizes that Gogolak used the whirligig to mark the Klines for death and confronts him. He concludes that Gogolak has been killing off community members who break the CC&Rs with a tulpa. Mulder arrests Gogolak and handcuffs him to a mailbox. Unable to flee, Gogolak finds himself in the path of the tulpa, who attacks and kills him; however, by killing its master, the tulpa disintegrates into dirt.

== Production ==
=== Inspiration and writing ===
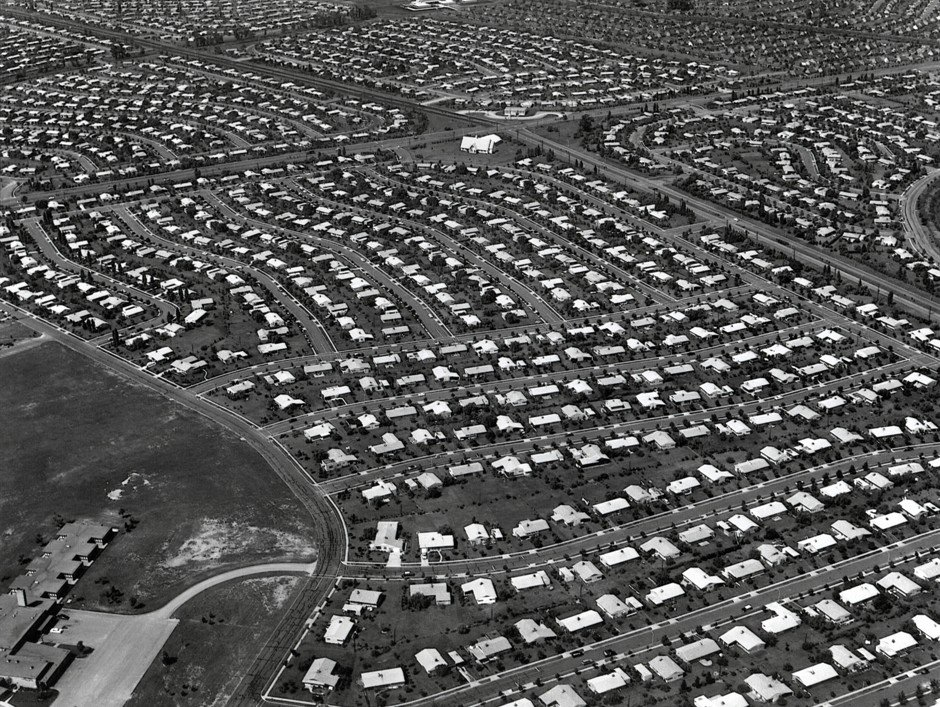
"Arcadia" was inspired by life in planned communities.

Daniel Arkin, a first year staff writer for the show, was inspired to write "Arcadia" based on an incident that had occurred several years prior: In 1991, he had moved into an "uptight" planned community in Greenwich Village. Unfortunately, his movers showed up late, forcing him to begin unloading his belongings in the later part of the evening. Because Arkin had neglected to read the community's "three hundred page" long covenants, conditions, and restrictions, he was later shocked to discover that the complex had fined him one thousand dollars for moving in after the approved hours. The incident stuck in Arkin's mind, and when he was tasked with writing a story for The X-Files, he immediately jumped to the "frightening" reality of planned communities.

The story went through many variations, and when Arkin wrote his first draft, the main antagonist was simply a man who served as a metaphorical "bogeyman." After series creator Chris Carter suggested that Arkin replace the human with an actual monster, he quickly re-wrote his story to include elements of the Tulpa myth. The idea to "marry" Mulder and Scully came from a writers meeting, as everyone felt it would be a convincing way for Mulder and Scully to go undercover.

=== Casting and design ===
Abraham Benrubi, noted at the time for his work as Jerry Markovic on the NBC hospital drama ER, was cast by Rick Millikan to play Big Mike. The NBC production staff was hesitant to allow him to appear on the show, given his tight production schedule, but, as Millikan later explained, "there was a small window—he had a few days off—and we were able to squeeze him in there."

Cheri Montesanto-Medcalf, the make-up department head for The X-Files, was responsible for making Benrubi appear mauled and bloody. Applying the necessary makeup and prosthetics took four hours, and Benrubi wore his makeup for almost twelve hours straight. Costume designer Christine Peters was tasked with designing the outfits for Mulder and Scully. Mulder's outfit was composed largely of "Lacoste Izod alligator shirts, Dockers, Bass Weejuns," and Scully's outfit was "jeans and a sweatshirt [or] khakis and sneakers." Peters noted that Scully's outfit was harder to design because Scully's character has "a 'look' that she doesn't want to give up."

=== Effects ===
The problem was that although the basic concept was good, no one could really envision what this strange beast—a psychological manifested compilation of garbage—should look like.

— Bruce Carter, discussing making the monster

The show's production crew had a difficult time designing the monster, which later earned a variety of colorful nicknames courtesy of the show's production staff, including "Gumby on Steroids," "Mr. Butterworth," "Fecal Fred," and "The Shit Monster.". Assistant director Bruce Carter explained that the two choices were either to make a creature that "has grown muscle and sinew through the force of Gene Gogolak's personality", or make a more conventional garbage creature covered in "banana peels and coffee grounds." Makeup supervisor John Vulich eventually designed a monster outfit that was, effectively, a "foam rubber suit" made out of urethane. Shredded rubber was then attached to the suit, which was then submerged in "gunk" to create the garbage effect. Despite all this work, the final episode does not contain many shots of the monster, as most of its scenes were cut during the editing phase.

Digital effects supervisor Bill Millar was tasked to edit Scully's "evidence video". He explained that "they wanted Scully's point of view rather than the Handicam's point of view." Unfortunately, he was given the film the Friday before the episode aired. The complete special effects for just this short video required roughly six hours to complete.

== Reception ==
=== Ratings ===
"Arcadia" premiered on the Fox network on March 7, 1999. This episode earned a Nielsen rating of 10.5, with a 16 share, meaning that roughly 10.5 percent of all television-equipped households, and 16 percent of households watching television, were tuned in to the episode. It was viewed by 17.91 million viewers. The episode aired in the United Kingdom and Ireland on Sky1 on June 20, 1999, and received 1.02 million viewers, making it the most watched episode that week.

=== Reviews ===
"Arcadia" received mostly positive reviews from critics. Rob Bricken from Topless Robot named "Arcadia" the tenth funniest X-Files episode and noted the two levels of humor in the episode—the "blatantly hilarious" pairing of Mulder and Scully as husband and wife, and the "perfect parody" of the planned community way of life. Timothy Sexton from Yahoo! News named "The Arcadia Garbage Monster" as one of "The Best X-Files Monsters of the Week". Robert Shearman, in his book Wanting to Believe: A Critical Guide to The X-Files, Millennium & The Lone Gunmen, rated the episode four stars out of five and noted that the inherent draw of the episode was "seeing Mulder and Scully go under-cover as a yuppie married couple." Despite the general praise for the episode, however, Shearman slightly criticized the ending, calling the final scene "rushed."

Emily VanDerWerff of The A.V. Club awarded the episode a "B+" and called it "a solid example of the show’s mid-period form". However, she noted that the episode is not one of the series' best, unlike the way many fans portray it—due largely to the fact that "it allows us to see what it would be like if Mulder and Scully were a happily married couple"—and that "the episode’s monster is a little hard to figure out".

Tom Kessenich, in his book Examination: An Unauthorized Look at Seasons 6–9 of the X-Files gave the episode a more mixed review, writing "after watching 'Arcadia', I feel like I just had a couple slices of pizza for dinner on Thanksgiving. Not bad, but hardly the feast I have come to expect." Paula Vitaris from Cinefantastique gave the episode a mixed review and awarded it two stars out of four. Vitaris, despite praising David Duchovny's performance during the scenes wherein he "rebels against the rules", called the episode's main villains "stereotypes of self-indulgent, insulated suburbanites."

== Bibliography ==
- Kessenich, Tom (2002). Examination: An Unauthorized Look at Seasons 6–9 of the X-Files. Trafford Publishing. ISBN 1-55369-812-6.
- Meisler, Andy (2000). The End and the Beginning: The Official Guide to the X-Files Season 6. HarperCollins. ISBN 0-06-107595-7.
- Shearman, Robert (2009). Wanting to Believe: A Critical Guide to The X-Files, Millennium & The Lone Gunmen. Mad Norwegian Press. ISBN 978-0-9759446-9-1.
