= Trevor (The X-Files) =

- The X-Files episode
- Mulder examines the drastically burned face of Bo Merkle, one of Pinker's former acquaintances. Although many reviews derided the plot, Cinefantastique praised the show's fake corpses.
- Episode no.: Season 6 Episode 17
- Directed by: Rob Bowman
- Written by: Jim Guttridge; Ken Hawryliw
- Production code: 6ABX17
- Original air date: April 11, 1999
- Running time: 45 minutes

Guest appearances
- John Diehl as Wilson 'Pinker' Rawls; Catherine Dent as June Gurwitch; Tuesday Knight as Jackie Gurwitch; Frank Novak as Superintendent Raybert Fellowes; David Bowe as Robert Werther; Lamont Johnson as Whaley; Keith Brunsmann as Bo Merkle; Jerry Giles as Security Guard; Jeffrey Schoeny as Trevor; Cary Pfeffer as Anchorman; Terri Merryman as Newscaster; Jerry Giles as Security Guard; Ed Corbin as Guard; Christopher Dahlberg as State Trooper; Robert Peters as Sergeant

Episode chronology
| ← Previous "Alpha" | Next → "Milagro" |
- The X-Files season 6

"Trevor" is the seventeenth episode of the sixth season of the science fiction television series The X-Files. It premiered on the Fox network on April 11, 1999, in the United States. The episode was written by Jim Guttridge and Ken Hawryliw, and directed by Rob Bowman. "Trevor" is a "Monster-of-the-Week" episode, unconnected to the series' wider mythology. "Trevor" earned a Nielsen household rating of 10.4, being watched by 17.6 million people in its initial broadcast. The episode received mostly negative reviews from critics.

The X-Files centers on a pair of FBI Special Agents Fox Mulder (David Duchovny) and Dana Scully (Gillian Anderson) who work on cases usually, but not exclusively, linked to the paranormal, called X-Files. Agent Mulder is a believer in the paranormal, while the skeptical Agent Scully has been assigned by the FBI to debunk his work. However, the two have developed a close friendship. In "Trevor", Agents Mulder and Scully search for an escaped convict in Mississippi who was suspected of killing his prison warden under mysterious circumstances. They then set out to find and apprehend him, but in doing so, Agents Mulder and Scully quickly discover that he has the uncanny ability to pass through solid, conductive materials.

"Trevor" was co-written by Ken Hawryliw and Jim Guttridge, who developed a partnership after working on the television series Millennium. The episode was originally supposed to be set in Oklahoma, but was changed to Mississippi for budgetary reasons. In addition, many of the special effects used in the episode were created by conventional methods in order to not exceed the budget of the show; this included the removal of a scene that would have shown Pinker moving through the walls in a motel.

== Plot ==
In Stringer, Mississippi, inmate Wilson "Pinker" Rawls (John Diehl) is locked in an outdoor shack as punishment while tornadoes pass through a prison farm. Afterward, the shack is destroyed. Additionally, Pinker has seemingly disappeared and the prison warden is found dead, his body severed at the waist. Agents Fox Mulder (David Duchovny) and Dana Scully (Gillian Anderson) investigate, and while examining the crime scene, discover that a wall near the body has become extremely brittle.

Elsewhere, it is revealed that Pinker is alive and discovers that he can pass through solid objects. While searching for his former girlfriend, June Gurwitch, he confronts an old friend, Bo Merkle, who shoots him. However, the bullets pass through Pinker's body. Pinker then kills Bo. When Mulder and Scully investigate, Mulder theorizes that Pinker is the one responsible and that being struck by lightning during the storm somehow gave him the ability to pass through matter, which results in the objects he moves through becoming brittle.

The agents locate June, who has changed her name to hide from Pinker. Scully learns that June gave birth to Pinker's child, revealing that he is searching for the son he has never met. After Pinker leaves a message reading "I want what's mine," Mulder discovers that his ability does not work on glass, apparently because it acts as an electrical insulator. Pinker eventually kidnaps June and learns that his son, Trevor, has been raised by June's sister Jackie. When Pinker tries to take Trevor, Scully locks herself and the boy inside a glass telephone booth, which Pinker cannot penetrate. Seeing Trevor's fear, Pinker decides to walk away. June suddenly hits him with her car; though Pinker passes through the car's metal body, the glass windshield cuts him in half, killing him.

== Production ==
=== Writing ===
Pinker is a crazed killer, but not a monster. [...] I mean, in truth, the real villain of the piece is June—an upwardly mobile woman who basically sold out her boyfriend, then gave up her son so she would be more attractive as a single woman. I think that makes an interesting contrast to Pinker—a man who'd do anything to get out of prison and be with his son.

— Rob Bowman, on the nature of Pinker

"Trevor" was co-written by Ken Hawryliw and Jim Guttridge. Hawryliw had been The X-Files' property master while the show was filmed in Vancouver, British Columbia (1993–98). Over the years, he had written several scripts in his spare time but had never submitted them to The X-Files writing staff. Eventually, he secured a job on Millennium, where he developed a friendship with Guttridge. Guttridge showed Hawryliw a script he had been writing that he wanted to submit for The X-Files. Hawryliw enjoyed the premise but felt it was not written in the X-Files style. Hawryliw thus proposed that the two form a partnership: Guttridge would develop the basic story and script and Hawryliw would help transform the story into an acceptable X-Files script. Hawryliw later explained that the idea to make Pinker search out his son came from a desire to humanize the antagonist: "There's this unique man who can walk through walls. Now, who would this ability best apply to? Well, a convict obviously—a guy in prison. But then we had to give him an even stronger, more compelling reason to want his freedom, and that was where his son came from".

After the episode was submitted, several re-writes were requested. Originally, the story was supposed to take place in a "conventional" state prison located in Oklahoma, but because securing such a set would cause the episode to go over budget, the writers decided to set the story on a Mississippi prison farm instead. Another scene, originally scripted to take place at a motel, featured Pinker taking a short cut through a wall. This scene was cut not only because it proved too expensive, but also because the writers were hoping "to shift the episode's emphasis from the supernatural to the emotional."

=== Casting and filming ===
When it came time to cast the part of Pinker, casting director Rick Millikan auditioned dozens of actors before reaching out to noted actor John Diehl, famous for his work in the television series Miami Vice, as well as the films Stargate (1994) and Nixon. Millikan explained that, "[Diehl] had been on my list to put into the show since Day One. [...] It turned out the producers like him too—he'd read for us a couple of times already—and we were able to get him in without even a reading".

Director Rob Bowman used a combination of "clever camera angles, strategic use of breakaway cement, and—in the case of Mulder's trunk lid—the miracle of auto-body repair substance Bondo" to avoid going over-budget. Bowman was most proud of the scene where Mulder nudges a wall, only to have it crumble in the shape of a man. He explained that, "the first time we did it, all we got was a big square hole [...] but we didn't want it to look like Bugs Bunny with his ears sticking out, either". Eventually, the crew was able to create a breakaway section that "suggested, rather than outlined perfectly", the shape of a human body. To subtly imply the direction through which Pinker traveled, hair department head Dena Green was instructed to backcomb Diehl's hair for any scene taking place after he had walked through a solid.

== Reception ==
"Trevor" first aired in the United States on April 11, 1999. This episode earned a Nielsen rating of 10.4, with a 16 share, meaning that roughly 10.4 percent of all television-equipped households, and 16 percent of households watching television, were tuned in to the episode. It was viewed by 17.6 million viewers. The episode aired in the United Kingdom and Ireland on Sky1 on June 27, 1999, and received 0.73 million viewers. The episode was the third most watched episode that week, being beaten by The X-Files episode "Milagro".

Critical reception to the episode was mostly negative. Robert Shearman, in his book Wanting to Believe: A Critical Guide to The X-Files, Millennium & The Lone Gunmen, rated the episode two stars out of five, calling it "The X-Files at its most generic". Shearman noted that the episode had only one good visual gimmick; the ability for Pinker to walk through walls, which, they argue, was never exploited to its full extent. Ultimately, he concluded that, "'Trevor' is just a bit too disposable and routine to hold much interest". Emily VanDerWerff of The A.V. Club awarded the episode a "C" and wrote that the story "almost works", but that it "focuses too much on the 'monster' and not enough on Mulder and Scully." She called the finished product "something that has a very manufactured quality to it". Furthermore, she criticized that the title of the episode - given that half-way through the episode no one called Trevor has turned up and the antagonist is not motivated by money - suggests the idea that he "must have a son", who then however only gets 10 minutes of screentime. The review also criticizes that the episode tries "a reversal and make Pinker an object of the audience's sympathy, rather than the story's villain". VanDerWerff did, however, positively compliment the death sequences as well as the corpses, calling the latter "nicely gruesome". In a comparative list between Fringe episodes and The X-Files episodes, UGO Networks writer Alex Zalben named "Trevor" as the least effective "walking through walls" story, being beaten by the Fringe episode "Safe".

Not all reviews were negative. Paula Vitaris from Cinefantastique gave the episode a moderately positive review and awarded it two-and-a-half stars out of four. Vitaris, despite criticizing the shaky science behind the tornado with the ability to allow someone to pass through matter, called the episode's special effects "superb": she later cited the "fake corpses" as the best examples. Tom Kessenich, in his book Examination: An Unauthorized Look at Seasons 6–9 of the X-Files wrote positively of the episode, writing, "With 'Trevor' [the show] offered solid proof to those who thought otherwise that The X-Files can still deliver a powerful [Monster-of-the-Week] when the mood strikes."

== Bibliography ==
- Kessenich, Tom (2002). Examination: An Unauthorized Look at Seasons 6–9 of the X-Files. Trafford Publishing. ISBN 1-55369-812-6.
- Meisler, Andy (2000). The End and the Beginning: The Official Guide to the X-Files Season 6. HarperCollins. ISBN 0-06-107595-7.
- Shearman, Robert (2009). Wanting to Believe: A Critical Guide to The X-Files, Millennium & The Lone Gunmen. Mad Norwegian Press. ISBN 978-0-9759446-9-1.
