= Michael W. Watkins =

American cinematographer, television director and television producer

- Other names: Michael Watkins
- Occupations: Cinematographer, television director, television producer
- Years active: 1976–present
- Spouse: Melissa Trueblood

Michael W. Watkins (often credited as Michael Watkins) is an American cinematographer, television director and television producer. He has worked on Smallville, Boomtown, The X-Files, and Lois & Clark: The New Adventures of Superman, Monk, Law & Order, No Ordinary Family, Warehouse 13 and several other film and television series. He also directed the made for TV movies Deadlocked (2000), The Rockford Files (2010), as well as the 2004 TV miniseries 5ive Days to Midnight.

Watkins has won two Primetime Emmy Awards for his cinematography work on Quantum Leap.

As a producer, Watkins also produced episodes of Brooklyn South, Smallville, The X-Files, Prison Break, The Blacklist, as well as the 2001 made-for-TV movie Semper Fi.

Watkins is a member of the American Society of Cinematographers (A.S.C.)

== Selected television credits ==
- Lois & Clark: The New Adventures of Superman

- "Illusions of Grandeur" (1994), director
- "Whine, Whine, Whine" (1995), director
- "Ordinary People" (1995)
- "Chip Off the Old Clark" (1995)

- Detention: The Siege at Johnson High (1997)
- Millennium

- "Sacrament" (1997)

- The X-Files

- "X-Cops" (2000)
- "Sein und Zeit" (2000)
- "The Sixth Extinction" (2000)
- "Arcadia" (2000)
- "Tithonus" (2000)

- Smallville

- "Metamorphosis" (2001)
- "Jitters" (2001)

- No Ordinary Family

- "No Ordinary Brother" (2010)

- Criminal Minds: Suspect Behavior

- "Lonely Hearts" (2011)

- The Blacklist

- "Wujing" (2013)
- "Frederick Barnes" (2013)
- "Anslo Garrick Conclusion" (2013)
- "The Cyprus Agency" (2014)
- "Mako Tanida" (2014)
- "Berlin Conclusion" (2014)
- "Lord Baltimore" (2014)
- "Dr. Linus Creel" (2014)
- "The Decembrist" (2014)
- "Luther Braxton" (2015)
- "The Major" (2015)
- "Tom Connolly" (2015)
- "The Troll Farmer" (2015)
- "Zal Bin Hasaan" (2015)
- "The Vehm" (2016)
- "Cape May" (2016)
- "Esteban" (2016)
- "Dr. Adrian Shaw" (2016)
- "Natalie Luca" (2017)
- "Philomena" (2017)
- "Mr. Kaplan" (2017)
- "The Ending" (2017)

- SEAL Team

- "Rolling Dark" (2017)
- "Things Not Seen" (2019)
- "Rock Bottom" (2019)
- "Danger Crossing" (2019)

- Grey's Anatomy

- "Gut Feeling" (2018)
- "Add It Up" (2019)
- "It's Raining Men" (2019)
