= Levadura de Olla =

- Interactive map of Levadura de Olla

Restaurant information
- Established: 2019
- Owners: Thalía Barrios García, Jesús Neftalí Ramos Vargas
- Manager: Jesús Neftalí Ramos Vargas
- Head chef: Thalía Barrios García
- Food type: Oaxacan cuisine
- Rating: (Michelin Guide, 2024)
- Location: C. de Manuel García Vigil 304, Ruta Independencia, Oaxaca City, Mexico, Oaxaca, 68000, Mexico
- Coordinates: 17°03′51.7″N 96°43′30″W
- Website: levaduradeolla.mx

Levadura de Olla (Note: transl. "The yeast of the cooking pot") is a traditional Oaxacan restaurant in Oaxaca City, Mexico. It is co-owned by chef Thalía Barrios García and its manager Jesús Neftalí Ramos Vargas, who opened it in 2019. Its menu offers à la carte options. Levadura de Olla has received favorable reviews from food critics, and in 2024, the restaurant received one Michelin star in the first Michelin Guide covering restaurants in Mexico.

== Description ==
Levadura de Olla serves Mexican cuisine, particularly from the state of Oaxaca. Its menu emphasizes on vegetables over proteins. It offers à la carte options, divided in four sections: Oaxacan traditional dishes, cultural heritage dishes, ceremonial dishes commonly served on special occasions, and creative dishes. Its ingredients follow a farm-to-table approach. Its menu items have included chilecaldo (a type of stew cooked with chilhuacle chilli and tamalayota pumpkin, seasoned with Rangpur lime), amaranth soup, or tomato soup, the restaurant's signature dish.

Other dishes and drinks are based on maize, including tamales, mezcal, maize water, pozontle, tepache, and pulque.

== History ==
Thalía Barrios García is originally from Oaxaca; her family is from San Mateo Yucutindoo. She began selling chocolate at age six, tamales at seven, and an orange-based dessert at twelve. She opened Levadura de Olla in 2019 along with Jesús Neftalí Ramos Vargas. Levadura de Olla gets its name from the sourdough starter used to make the bread in her place of origin, and is located in a colonial-style courtyard.

== Reception ==
Isabelle Kliger wrote for The Times that the restaurant has an Andalusian atmosphere. A reviewer for The World's 50 Best Restaurants recommended the maize-based drinks.

When the Michelin Guide debuted in 2024 in Mexico, it awarded 18 restaurants with Michelin stars. Levadura de Olla received one star, meaning "high-quality cooking, worth a stop". Barrios also received Michelin's Young Chef Award that year. The restaurant also received the Sabores con Historia Award from the Mexican senate.

== See also ==
- List of Mexican restaurants
- List of restaurants in Mexico
