= Alcalde (restaurant) =

Restaurant in Guadalajara, Mexico

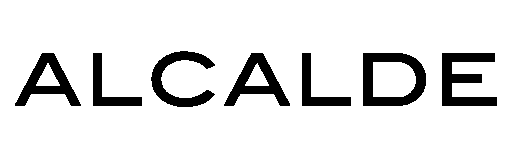

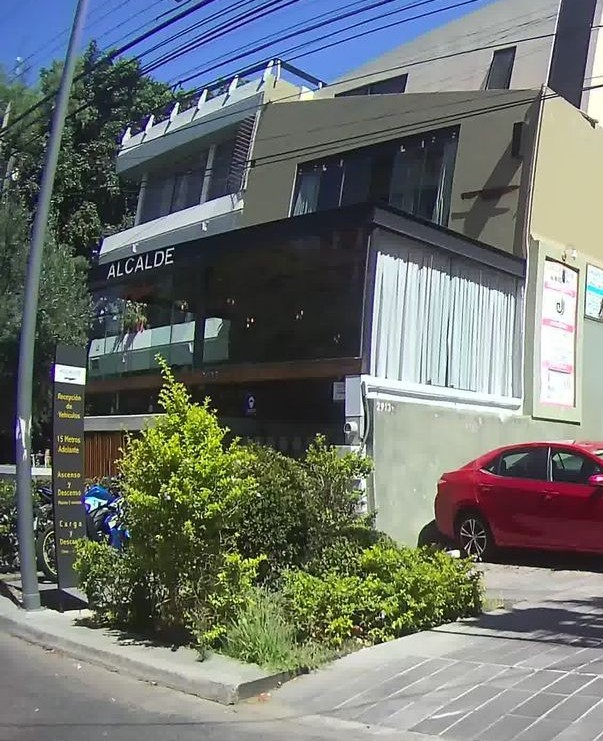
- Interactive map of Alcalde

Restaurant information
- Established: 13 January 2013; 13 years ago
- Head chef: Francisco "Paco" Ruano
- Food type: Mexican
- Rating: (Michelin Guide, 2026)
- Location: Av. México 2903, Vallarta Norte, Guadalajara, Jalisco, 44690, Mexico
- Coordinates: 20°40′45.8″N 103°23′23.2″W
- Seating capacity: 60
- Reservations: Yes
- Website: alcalde.com.mx

Alcalde is a restaurant in Guadalajara, Jalisco. It has daily à la carte options and a four-to seven-full-course tasting menu. It is owned by chef Francisco "Paco" Ruano, who opened it in 2013. The restaurant has received international recognition, ranking in the top 100 of the World's 50 Best Restaurants list, and in 2026, received one Michelin star in the third Michelin Guide covering Mexico.

== Description ==
Alcalde offers Mexican cuisine through a four- to seven-course tasting menu or a three-course à la carte option. Hors d'oeuvre have included green shrimp aguachile with apple, and requeijão gordita with California chili cream. Main courses have included suckling pig with pipián, huauzontle croquette, and pea purée, seasonal catch with salsa diabla and nopal. Desserts include jericalla, a Mexican custard. The restaurant sources fruits and vegetables from Ensenada, Baja California; fish from Nayarit; and legumes and tubers from the local region.

The building has space for 60 people and reservations are required.

== History ==
Francisco "Paco" Ruano began his culinary career after finishing high school. In 2001, he joined a cruise line and later worked for three years at Café des Artistes in Puerto Vallarta, Mexico. He then trained in Spain at Michelin-starred restaurants such as El Celler de Can Roca, Akelarre, and Mugaritz. He returned to Guadalajara, Jalisco, and opened Alcalde in 2013; it is named after Mercado Alcalde.

== Reception ==
Julie Schwietert Collazo wrote for Afar that "[s]easonal menus may be the norm these days, but many of Alcalde's dishes are likely to be unfamiliar even to aficionados of Mexican cuisine, ensuring an especially memorable culinary experience". A writer for Gourmand described Alcalde's cuisine as a festive expression of "flavors the palate understands, the heart remembers, and the mind applauds".

The British company William Reed Ltd publishes the annual list of The World's 50 Best Restaurants. Since 2022, the ranking has expanded to include restaurants listed from position 51 to 100. Alcalde was ranked 51st in 2022 and 2025, 54th in 2023, 55th in 2026, and 67th in 2024.

In 2026, Alcalde received one Michelin star in 2026, meaning "high-quality cooking, worth a stop".

== See also ==
- List of Michelin-starred restaurants in Mexico
