= Los Danzantes =

Restaurant chain in Mexico

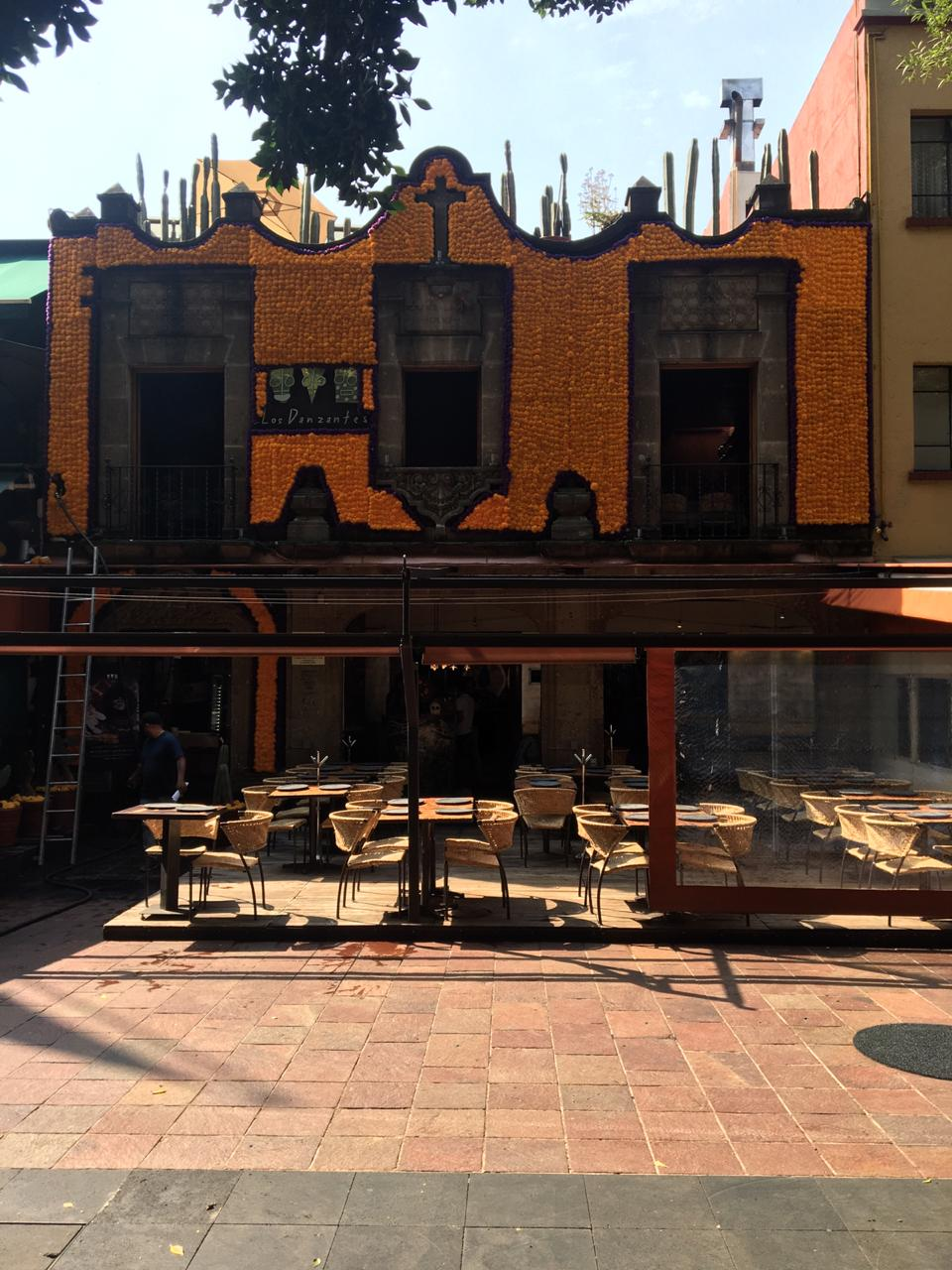
- The exterior of the Mexico City restaurant

Restaurant information
- Established: 1995 (Mexico City); 2001 (Oaxaca City)
- Owner: Gustavo Muñoz
- Manager: Grupo Los Danzantes
- Chef: Sergio Camacho (Mexico City); Alejandro Piñon (Mexico City); Alejandro Burgos (Oaxaca City)
- Food type: Mexican (Oaxacan)
- Rating: Oaxaca City (Michelin Guide, 2024)
- Location: Parque Centenario 12, Coyoacán, Mexico City (19°20′55.5″N 99°09′49″W); Macedonio Alcalá 403, int. 4, Centro, Oaxaca City (17°03′54.4″N 96°43′26.2″W), 04000 (Mexico City); 68000 (Oaxaca City), Mexico
- Reservations: Recommended for the Oaxacan restaurant
- Other locations
- Website: losdanzantes.com

Los Danzantes is a Mexican restaurant chain owned by Grupo Los Danzantes. There are two branches, one in Coyoacán, Mexico City, and one in Oaxaca City, Oaxaca; each one has an independent menu. The restaurants serve Mexican and Oaxacan cuisines and the Oaxacan restaurant received a Michelin star in 2024 in the first Michelin Guide covering restaurants in Mexico.

== Description ==
Los Danzantes Coyoacán serves Mexican cuisine, including Oaxacan options. It offers à la carte options that include esquites with shrimp, huitlacoche soup, duck magret with roselle mole, blue corn tlayudas, and mamey panna cotta. It serves a Mexican wine matching as well as mezcal.

Los Danzantes Oaxaca serves Mexican food, mainly Oaxacan. The menu includes hoja santa with goat cheese and tomatillo sauce, as well as mole, salsa borracha with pork ribs, guava cheesecake, and mezcal. The restaurant offers monthly options with seasonal ingredients. Reservations are recommended due to its popularity. Mariana Orsini described the cuisine as fusion cuisine, which mixes the cooking of different cultures.

== History ==
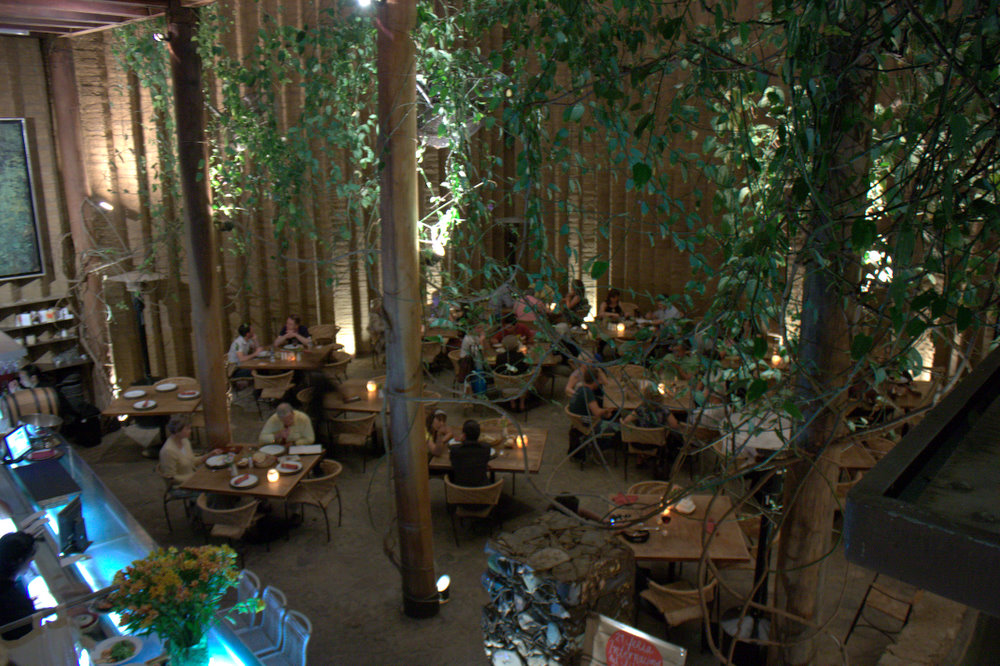
The interior of the Oaxacan restaurant

Los Danzantes was founded by entrepreneur Gustavo Muñoz. Originally, Gustavo wanted to open an ice cream parlor with an associate, but the project was never finished. The restaurant's name, which translates as 'the dancers', is an analogy for how flavors are like a dance that combines past, present, and future while continually returning to its roots. Los Danzantes Coyoacán opened in 1995 and, as of 2024, the chefs are Sergio Camacho and Alejandro Piñón. It is a colonial building located in front of the Jardín Centenario park, in Coyoacán, Mexico City. The interior design celebrates the Five Suns, an Aztec creation myth.

Around 1997, Gustavo opened a distillery in Santiago Matatlán, Oaxaca, which is managed by his twin brother, Jaime Muñoz. In 2001, Los Danzantes Oaxaca opened in the historic center of Oaxaca City. Alejandro Burgos is the chef, as of 2022. The eatery cultivates most of the fruits and vegetables used in the dishes in their orchard.

== Reception ==
When the Michelin Guide debuted in 2024 in Mexico, it awarded 18 restaurants with Michelin stars. Los Danzantes Oaxaca received one star—meaning "high-quality cooking, worth a stop". The guide added that "[s]et in a dazzling, open-air courtyard, the memorable space buzzes as personable servers guide locals and visitors alike". Additionally, it received a Michelin Green Star, which denotes excellence in sustainable gastronomy. Suzanne Barbezat wrote for Afar that the restaurant serves reinvented traditional dishes served with artistic presentations.

Michelin inspectors also visited the Mexico City branch, but it did not receive stars, adding that it "shines a spotlight on contemporary Mexican cuisine". In his review for Time Out, Guillermo Di Bella rated the Mexico City restaurant three out of five stars, criticized it for not having undergone a major makeover since the 1990s. While Marco Beteta recommended breakfast at the restaurant, Elena Eguiarte did so for dinner. María José Ferrant advised eating outside.

== See also ==
- List of Mexican restaurants
- List of Michelin-starred restaurants in Mexico
- List of restaurants in Mexico
