= Lunario (restaurant) =

Restaurant in Valle de Guadalupe, Mexico

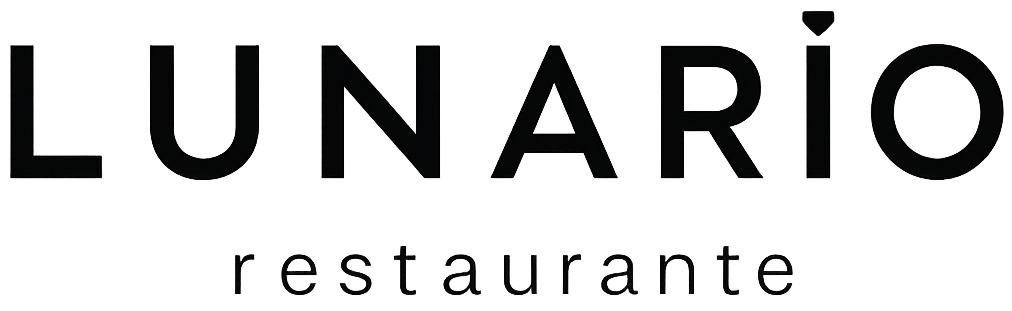

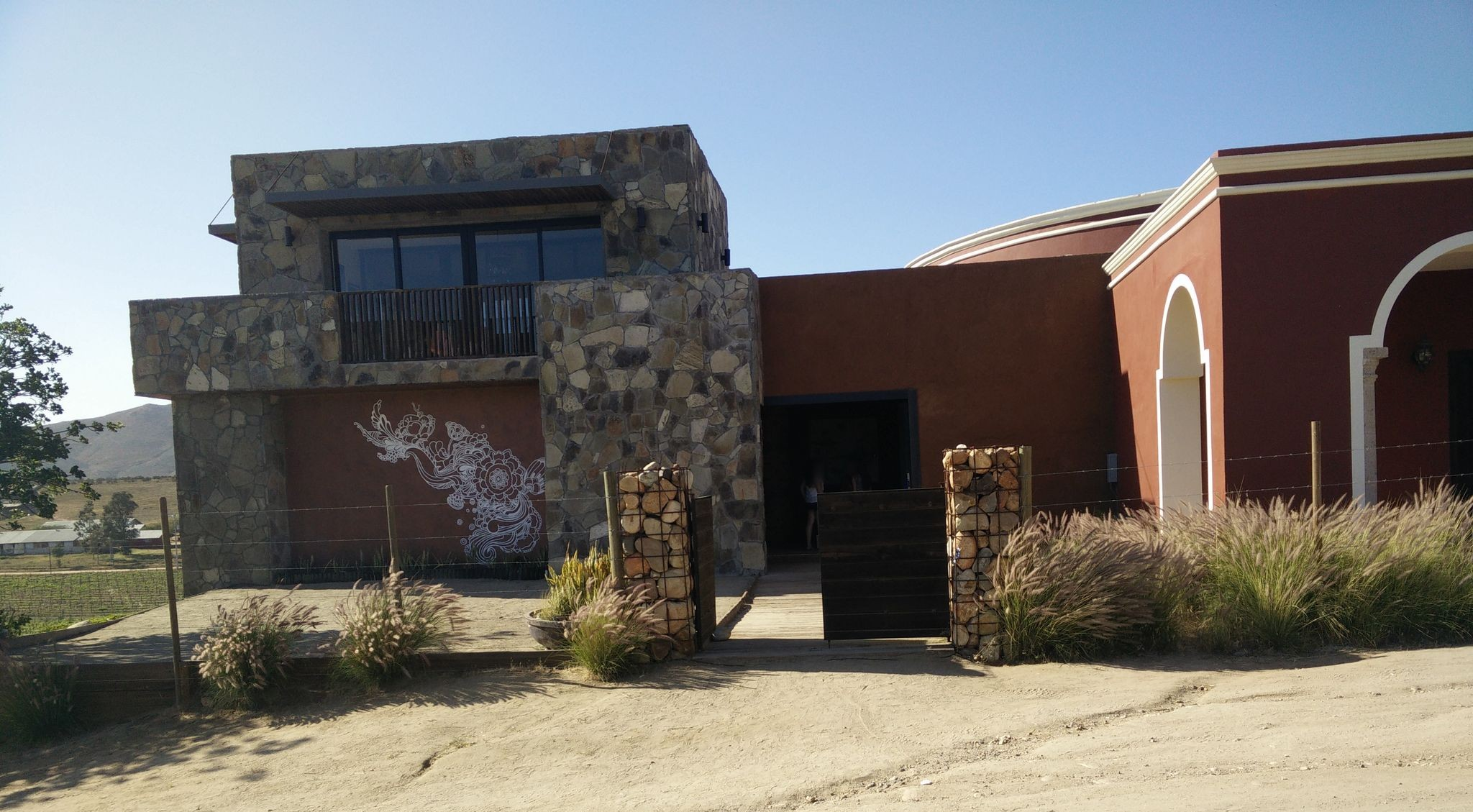
- The restaurant in 2015 operated as Traslomita
- Interactive map of Lunario

Restaurant information
- Established: 2014 (as Traslomita); 2019 (as Lunario)
- Owner: Fernando Pérez Castro
- Head chef: Sheyla Alvarado
- Food type: Mexican
- Rating: (Michelin Guide, 2025–present); (Michelin Guide, defunct)
- Location: Camino Vecinal Parcela 71, Fracción 3, Lote 13, Valle de Guadalupe, Ensenada, Baja California, 22750, Mexico
- Coordinates: 32°01′1.6″N 116°39′49″W
- Seating capacity: 35
- Website: restaurantelunario.com

Lunario is a fine dining Mexican restaurant in the ejido El Porvenir, in Valle de Guadalupe, Baja California, Mexico.

The restaurant is owned by Fernando Pérez Castro, head of the wine groups Lomita and Finca la Carrodilla. Originally, the group opened Traslomita in 2014 as an outdoor steakhouse that was open for half the year with the aim of promoting wines from the vineyard. Over the years, the concept was revamped, and Lunario was launched in 2019. Its dishes evolved into fine dining, with a more sustainable approach, focused primarily on farm-to-table dishes cooked with local vegetables and proteins. Sheyla Alvarado is the head chef.

Lunario received one green star for its sustainability practices in the first Michelin Guide covering restaurants in Mexico, and a Michelin star in the second guide.

== Description ==
Lunario serves monthly seasonal farm-to-table fine dining dishes, with ingredients sourced from Baja California, within a 20-kilometer (12 mi) radius. Lunario focuses on an six-to eight-full-course tasting menus based on vegetables, although it also serves proteins such as quail, lamb and seafood; they can be paired with wine options. Vegetables, proteins, honey, dairy products, and olive oil are obtained in the restaurant's property, as it has its own kitchen garden, animal enclosure and apiary, while seafood is sourced from the Pacific Ocean.

Dishes served have included sopes, mole, or salads. The menu has included options like carrot soup, oyster mushroom tamales, or shrimp sopes.

Afar described the restaurant's building as "minimalist stone-and-wood [place]", and the Michelin Guide says it has a "Brooklyn-chic design" similar to a greenhouse, whose interior contrasts with the "winding path" outside. The restaurant has an open kitchen, a bar, and seats 35 guests.

== History ==
Finca La Carrodilla, owned by Pérez Castro

In 2014, the wine groups Lomita and Finca la Carrodilla, led by Fernando Pérez Castro, opened Traslomita as an outdoor steakhouse. He said the restaurant was created "to showcase our wines". It originally opened during the warmer months and closed in the winter. According to Pérez, the restaurant evolved into a fine-dining establishment in view there were limited restaurant options open year-round in Valle de Guadalupe and because its operators "wanted to move away completely from exposed wood, rustic elements, and recycled [trending] materials".

For the renovation, they drew inspiration from the local fine-dining restaurant Laja. Lunario opened in 2019; its name means "relating to the moon" is Spanish, and the decor was adapted accordingly, with round decorative elements and tableware and light-colored tones. Lunario stopped serving meat because it had to be sourced from outside its self-established 20-kilometer (12 mi) radius; instead, it focused more on local proteins. Later due to the COVID-19 pandemic, the restaurant operators decided to remove the grills completely, as the Federal Commission for the Protection against Sanitary Risk had strict operating requirements.

Sheyla Alvarado became Lunario's head chef. She is originally from Sonora. She completing her internship at Cosme, Mirazur, and Sud 777. After that, Pérez Castro invited her to work at Traslomita. According to her, she began experimenting with more elaborate dishes, and after talking with the owners, Lunario was created.

After changing the restaurant's business model, the team adopted a more sustainable approach focused on supporting local producers. According to Alvarado, Food waste is composted, while wastewater passes through a biodigester that separates grease before the treated water is used to irrigate the garden.

== Reception ==
In 2024, Michelin Guide covered Baja California and Lunario a Michelin Green Star for its sustainability. The next year, it received one Michelin star. For the guide, simple dishes like soups and sopes become distinctive creations. For The World's 50 Best Restaurants, Alvarado's dishes are "[beautifully] distinctive", ranking it along the 100 best Latin American restaurants, and received a recognition for its sustainability in 2024.

== See also ==
- La Cocina de Doña Esthela, a nearby restaurant
- List of Michelin-starred restaurants in Mexico
