= Thalía Barrios García =

Mexican chef (born c. 1996)

- Born: c. 1996; San Mateo Yucutindoo, Oaxaca, Mexico
- Education: Technological University of the Central Valley of Oaxaca
- Culinary career
- Current restaurants: Levadura de Olla* La Cocina de Humo
- Awards won: Michelin star (Levadura de Olla, 2024)* Michelin Guide Mexico Young Chef Award Winner (2024)* Young Chef of the Year by Canirac (2024)

Thalía Barrios García (born c. 1996) is a Mexican chef specializing in traditional Oaxacan cuisine. In 2024, she earned her first Michelin star for her traditional Oaxacan restaurant, Levadura de Olla when she was 28-years-old.

== Biography ==
Barrios García grew up in San Mateo Yucutindoo, in the Sierra Sur region of Oaxaca. Barrios García honed her business and culinary skills at a young age. At age 6, she was selling chocolates at a local market, then from age 7 to 11, she sold her grandmother's tamales. At age 12, she started Naranja Dulce, a cake company. She was inspired to become a chef from the women in her family who were known for their traditional recipes. Her parents were initially concerned a career in the kitchen would be a difficult life for their daughter, but were fully supportive of Barrios García's determination to pursue further education in the culinary arts.

=== Culinary education ===
Barrios García attended Technological University of the Central Valley of Oaxaca where she majored in gastronomy. At age 18 when she first left home to attend university, she discovered the wide variety of seasonal produce and cuisine from different parts of Oaxaca. The different flavors inspired her to learn the various traditions from across the state. While attending culinary school, she started a taco stand in San Pablo Huixtepec and sold homemade ice cream while interning at a local restaurant. It was there where she started to explore a restaurant career that would focus on highlighting cuisine from her home state.

=== Restaurateur ===
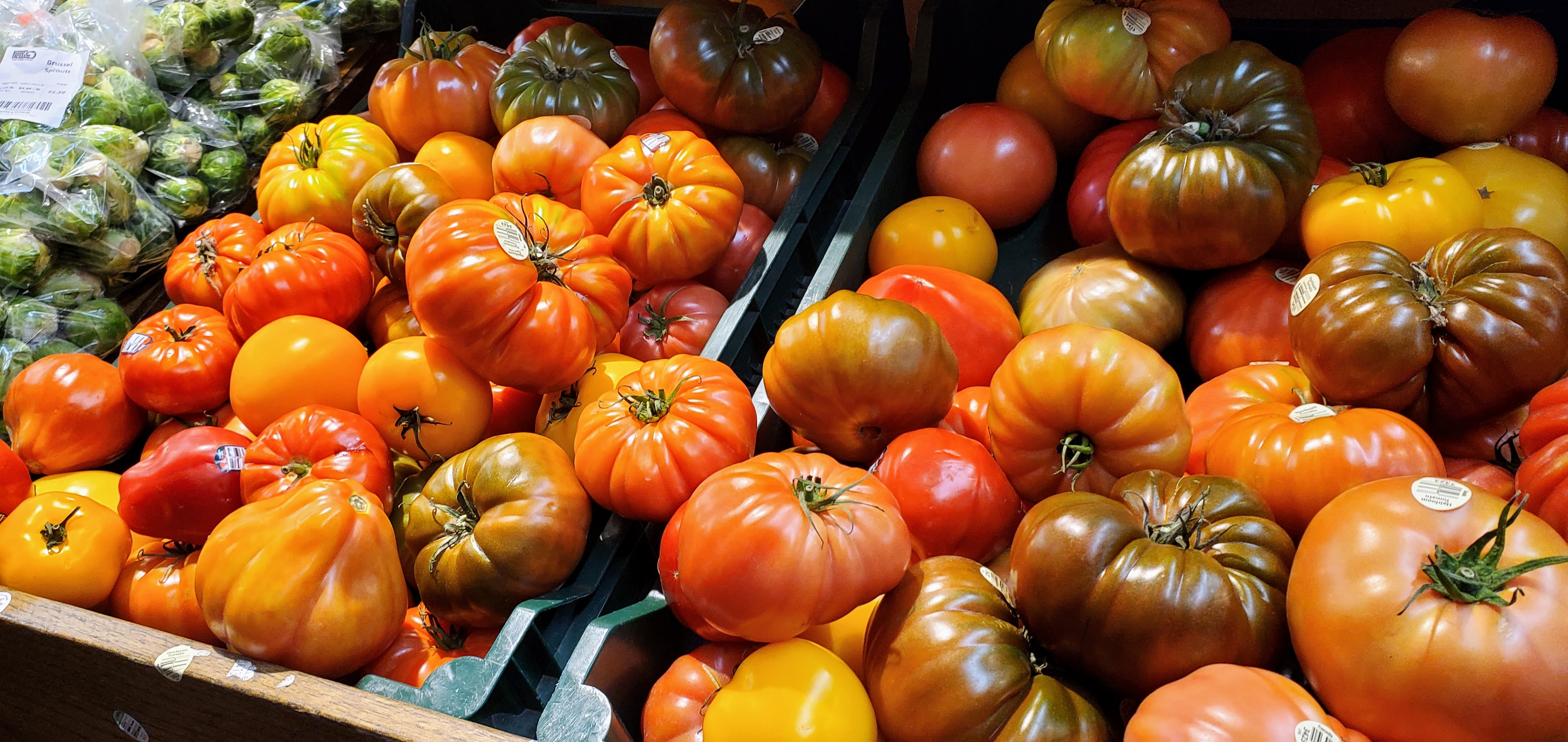
Barrios García is known for her tomato salads that use many varieties of the fruit.

In 2019, she opened her first restaurant, a casual eatery named Levadura de Olla. In 2021, she opened her second restaurant, La Cocina de Humo. Both establishments serve traditional Oaxacan cuisine showcasing recipes from across the state's regions and are located in the Oaxaca City historical district. Barrios-García ensures her restaurant staff are involved in all aspects of food preparation, from learning how to plant the vegetables, to selecting produce from local farmers, to preparation and cooking. Barrios García has additionally launched a research project to explore Oaxaca's native tomatoes, in an effort to develop the fruit, one of her favorite vegetables.

=== Recognition ===
In May 2024, at 28 years old, she was named the Michelin Guide Mexico Young Chef Award Winner, and received her first Michelin star for Levadura de Olla Restaurante. That September, she was named Young Chef of the year by Mexico's national restaurant association Canirac.

== See also ==
- List of female chefs with Michelin stars
- List of Michelin-starred restaurants in Mexico
