= Ixi'im =

Restaurant in Chocholá Municipality, Yucatán, Mexico

- Interactive map of Ixi'im

Restaurant information
- Food type: Mexican
- Location: Chocholá Municipality, Yucatán, Mexico
- Coordinates: 20°45′19″N 89°52′06″W

Ixi'im is a Michelin-starred Mexican restaurant in Chocholá Municipality, Yucatán, Mexico.

== See also ==
- List of Mexican restaurants
- List of Michelin-starred restaurants in Mexico
