= Olivea (disambiguation) =

Olivea is a genus of rust fungi. Olivea may also refer to:

- Shane Olivea (1981–2022), American professional football
- Olivea Morton, a fictional character from the Percy Jackson franchise
- Olivea Farm to Table, a restaurant in Mexico
