= Sud 777 =

Mexican restaurant in Mexico City

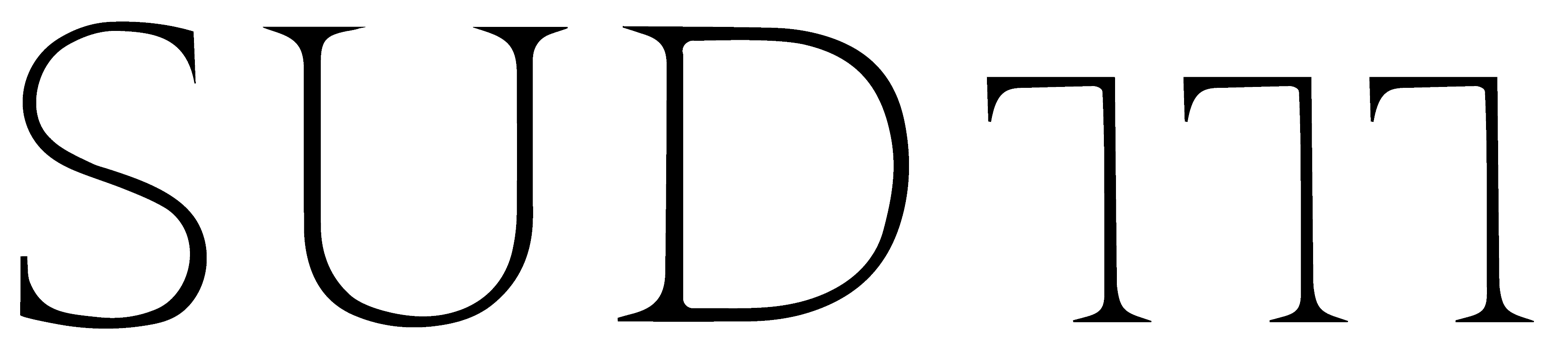

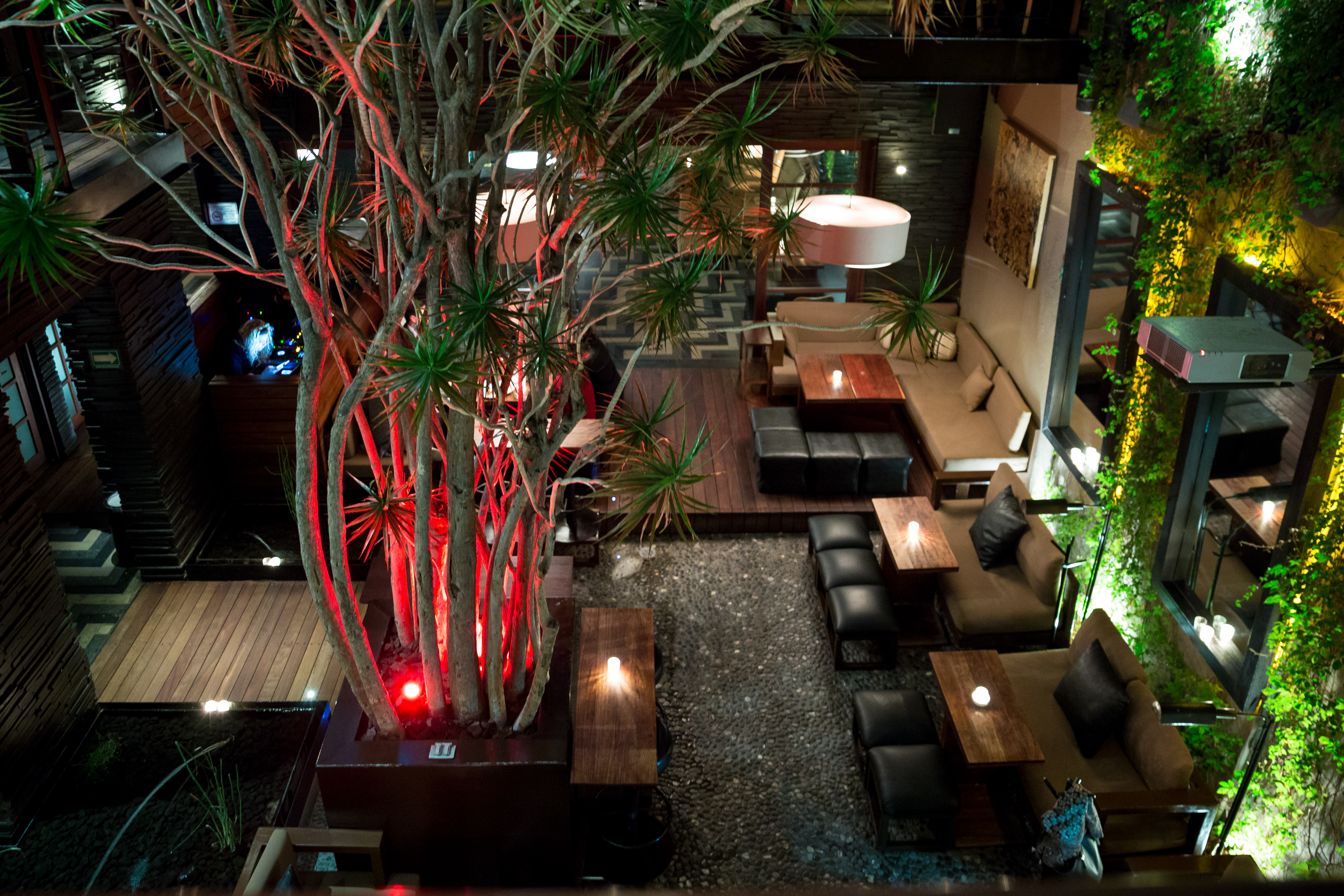
- The restaurant's interior
- Interactive map of Sud 777

Restaurant information
- Established: 2008
- Owner: Edgar Núñez
- Head chef: Edgar Núñez
- Food type: French
- Rating: (Michelin Guide, 2024)
- Location: Boulevard de la Luz 777, Jardines del Pedregal, Álvaro Obregón, Mexico City, 01900, Mexico
- Coordinates: 19°18′31.7″N 99°12′32.7″W
- Reservations: Yes
- Website: sud777.com.mx/en

Sud 777 (sometimes stylized SUD777) is a restaurant in Jardines del Pedregal, Álvaro Obregón, Mexico City. It is owned by chef Edgar Núñez, who founded it in 2008. It has à la carte options and a twelve-course tasting menu. The restaurant serves French food prepared with Mexican ingredients, mainly the country's vegetables.

Sud 777 has received positive reviews and was awarded one Michelin star in 2024 in the first Michelin Guide covering restaurants in Mexico. In 2023, Sud 777 was added to the British company William Reed Ltd's publication The World's 50 Best Restaurants, as the list was expanded to include restaurants from positions 51 to 100.

== Description ==
According to Jorge Toledo from El Economista, instead of serving conventional Mexican food, Sud 777's dishes are made with Mexican ingredients using French cooking methods; as an example, he said that duck leg is fried similarly to carnitas, in its fat. The primary ingredient of the food is vegetables and the restaurant offers an à la carte menu along with a seasonal twelve-course tasting menu.

Reservations are required to dine at Sud 777; the restaurant has a chef's table where Núñez provides a seven-course meal and Mexican wine to up to eight people who reserve it in advance. In addition, there is a sushi-only section named Kokeshi and a lounge bar.

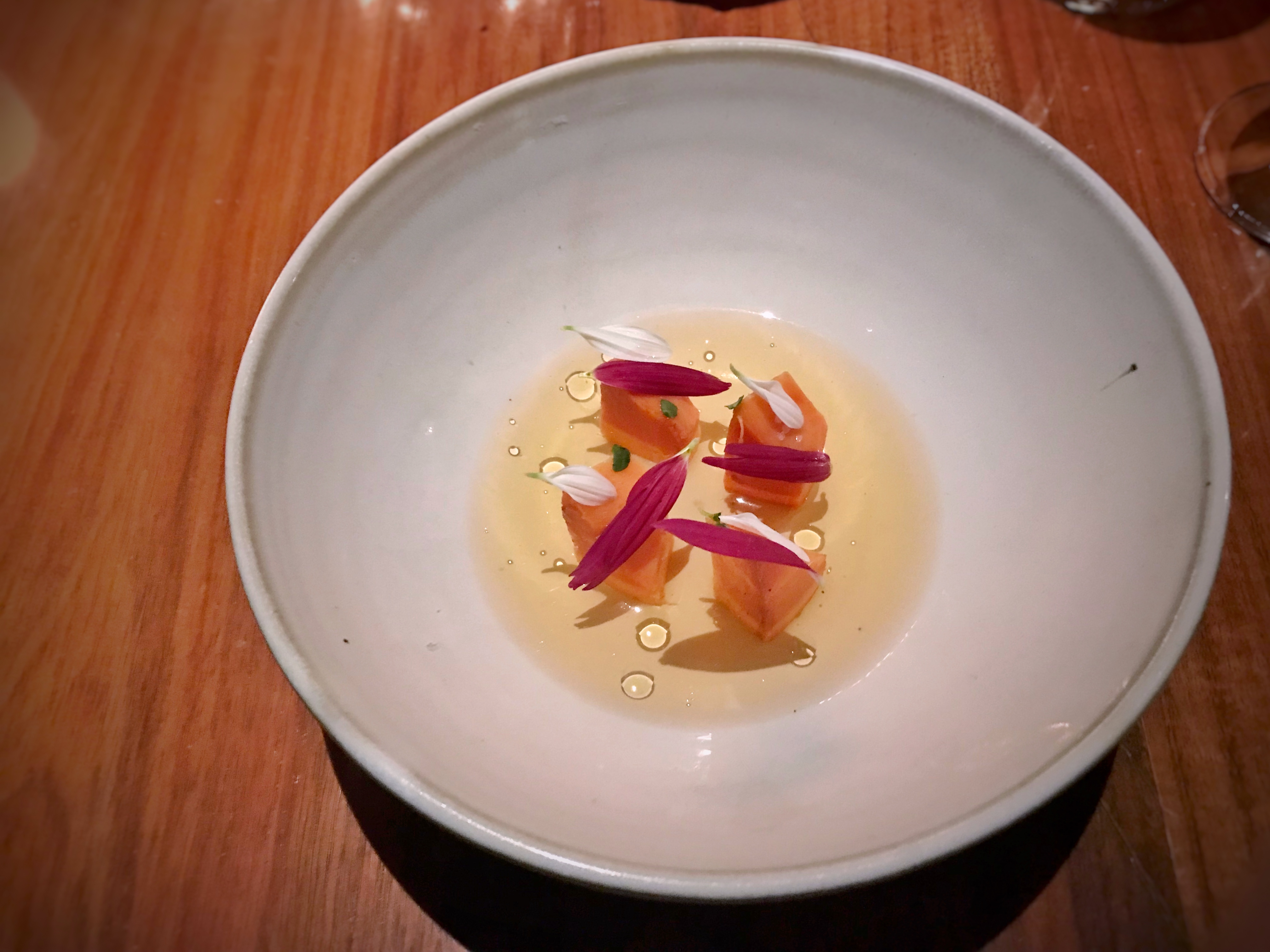
Tomato consommé, infused in mamey pixtle and a flower

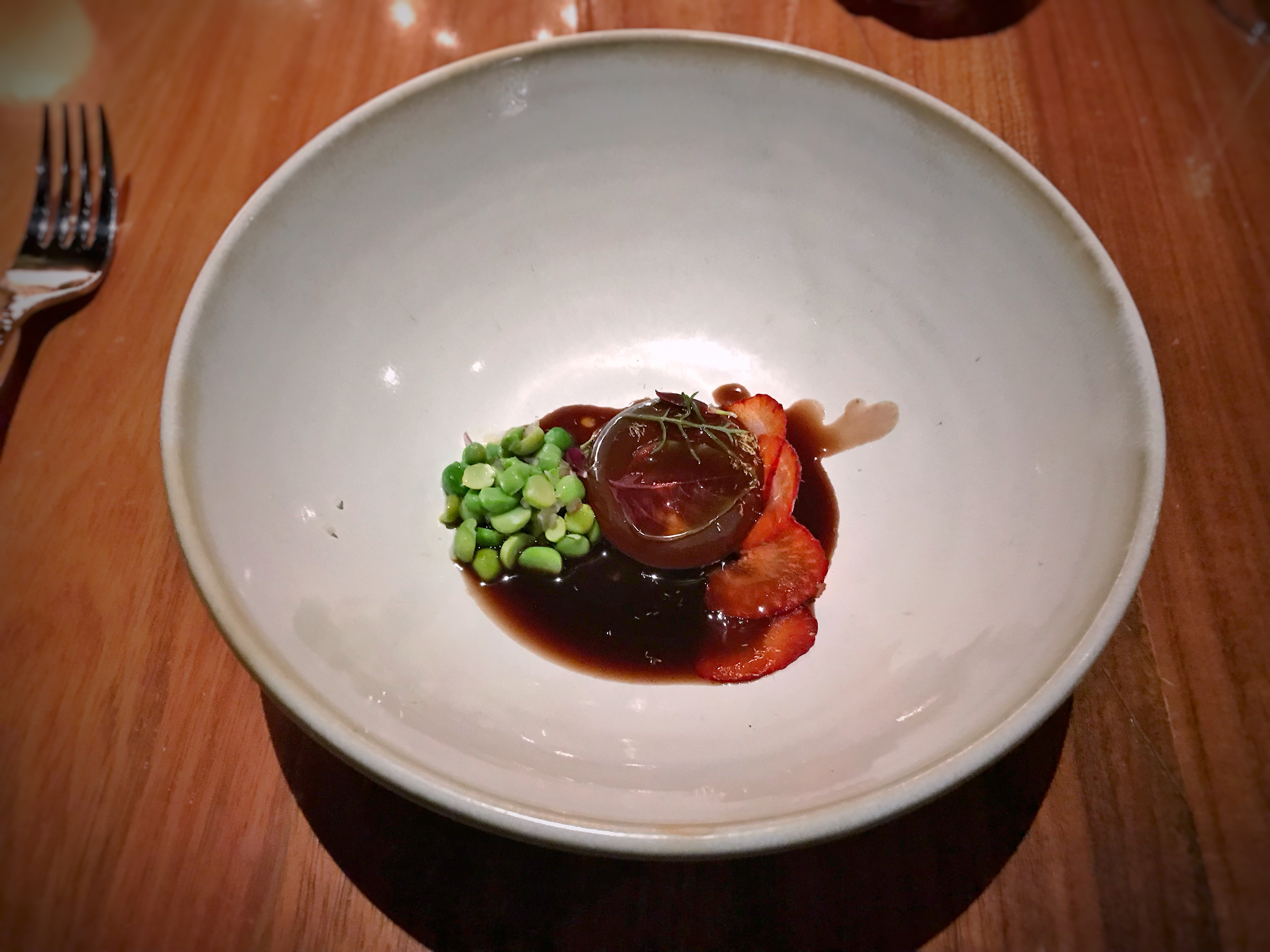
Green peas, strawberry, sherry mint, and oxtail reduction

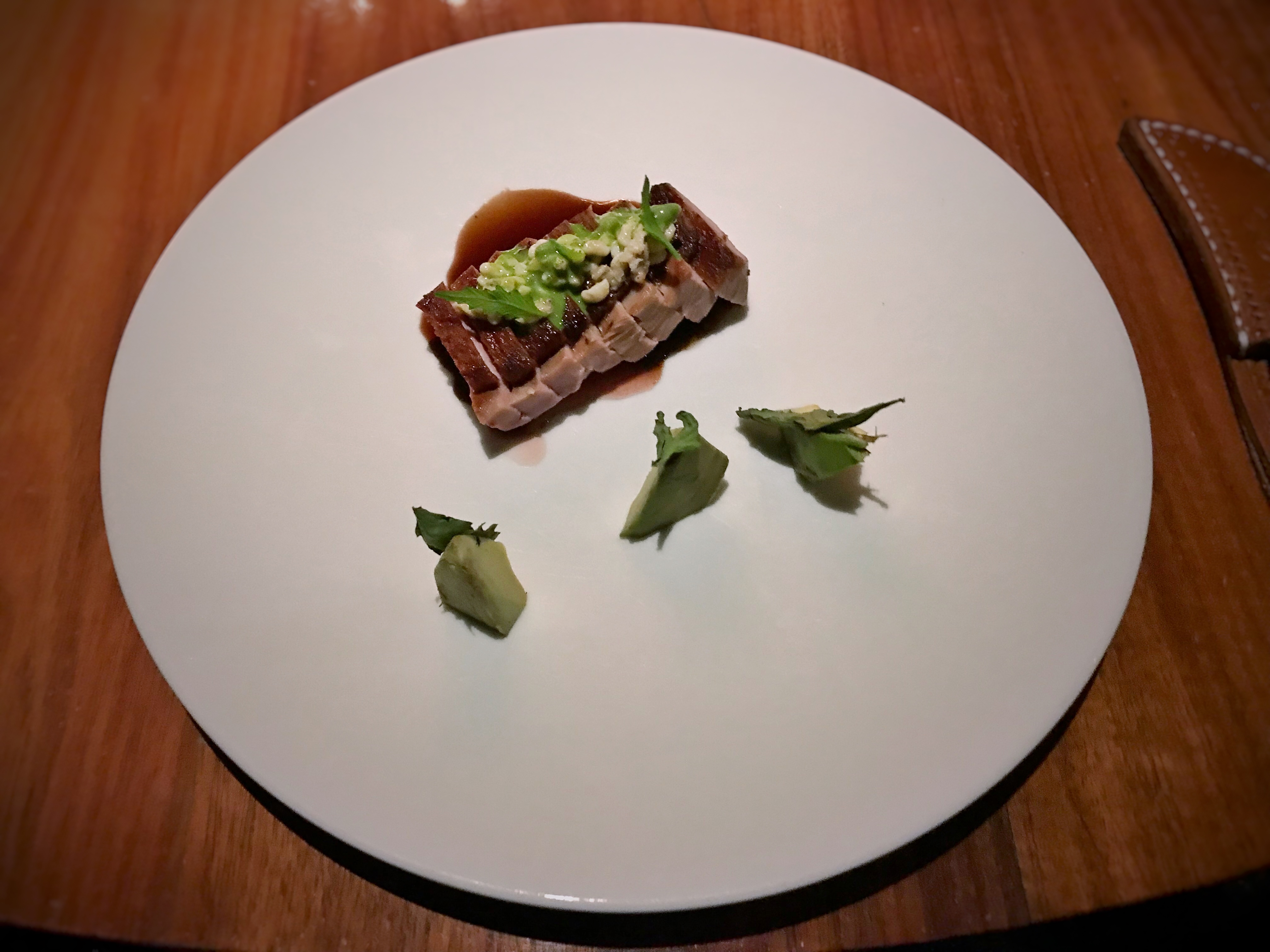
Duck magret, ant eggs and smoked avocado

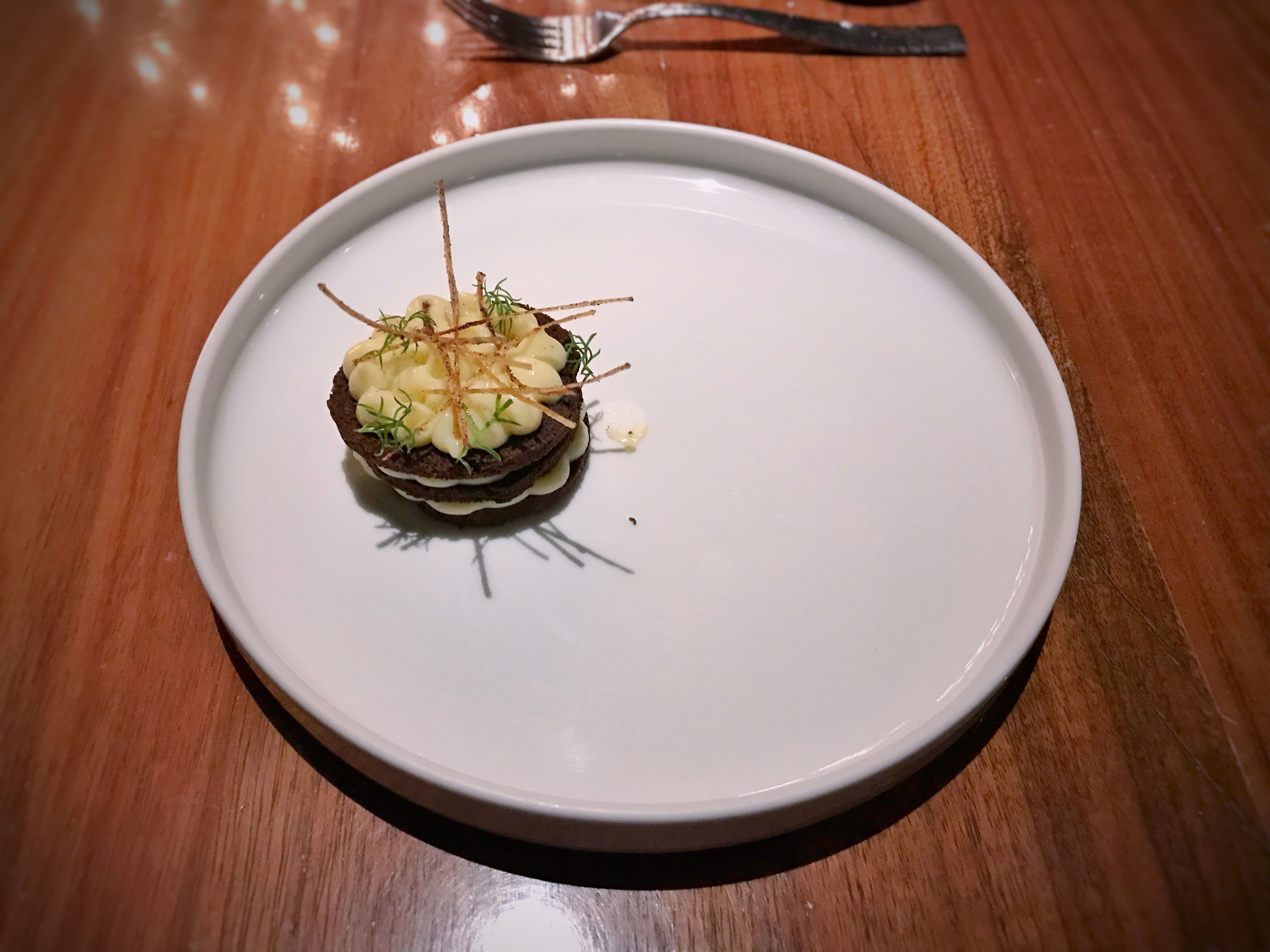
Leek, potato and cinnamon

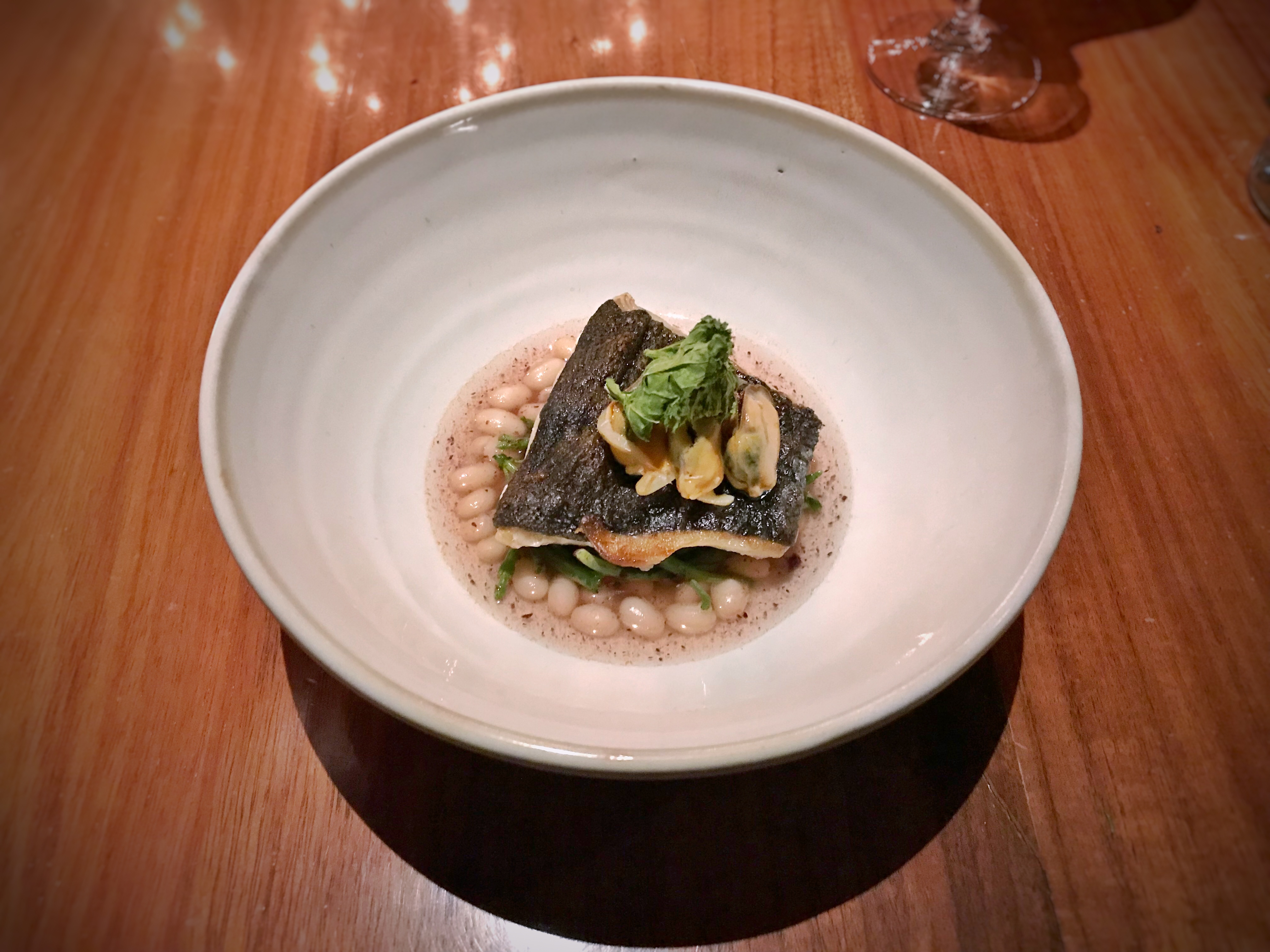
Black cod, beans stock, kale and sea asparagus

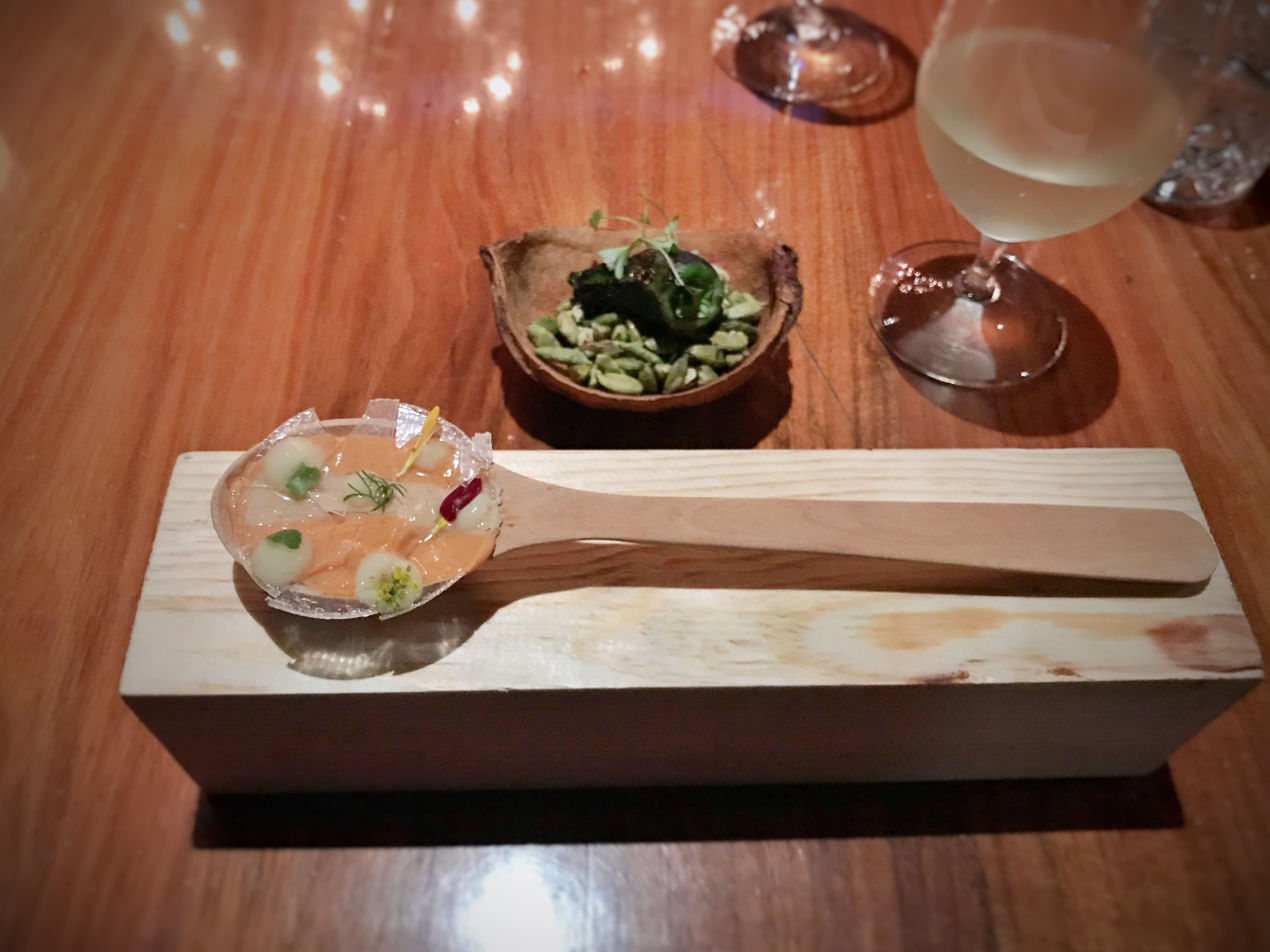
Foie gras in a spoon and charcoal bell pepper, chocolate, and sea salt

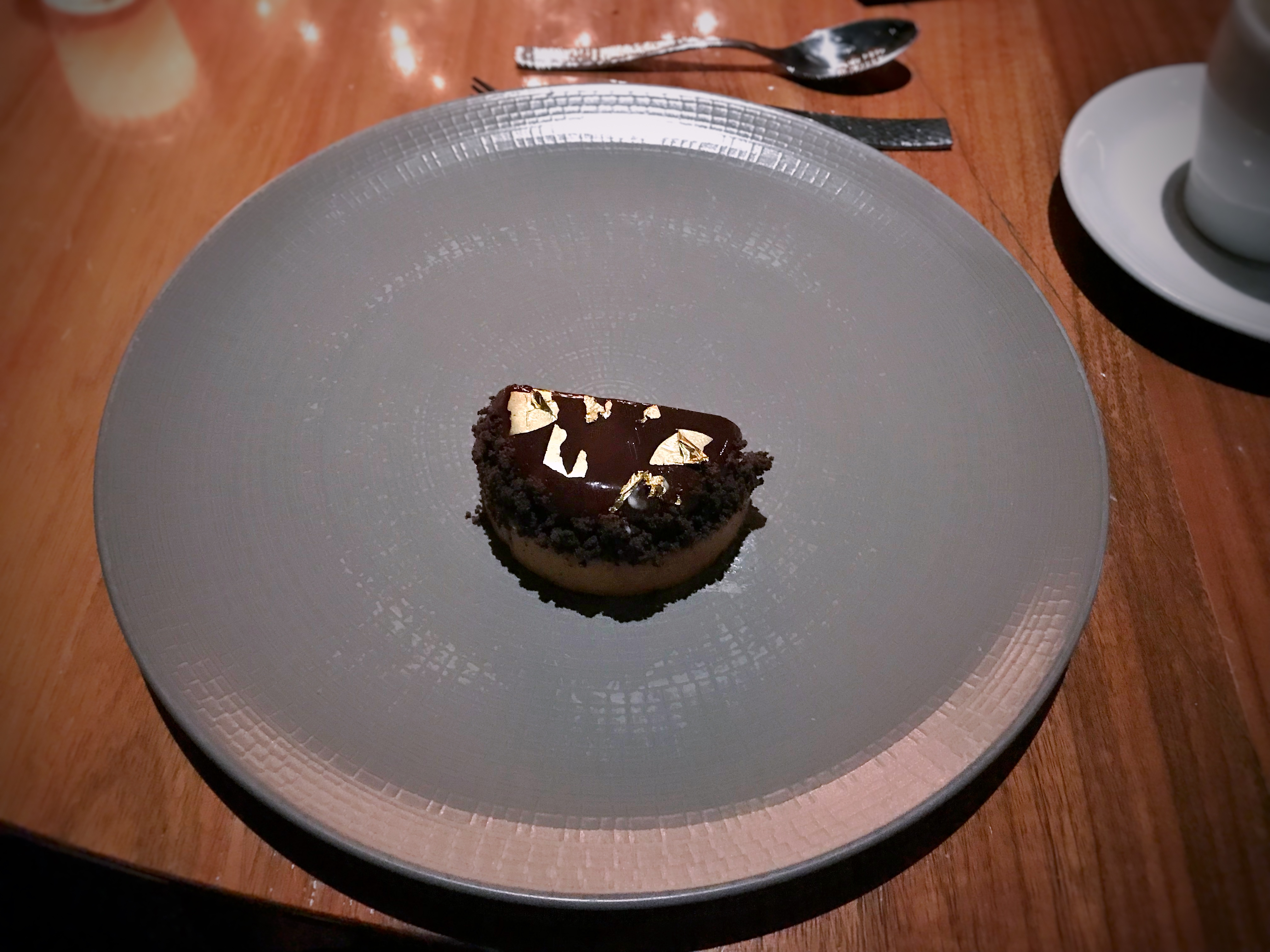
Coffee, orange and cacao cake

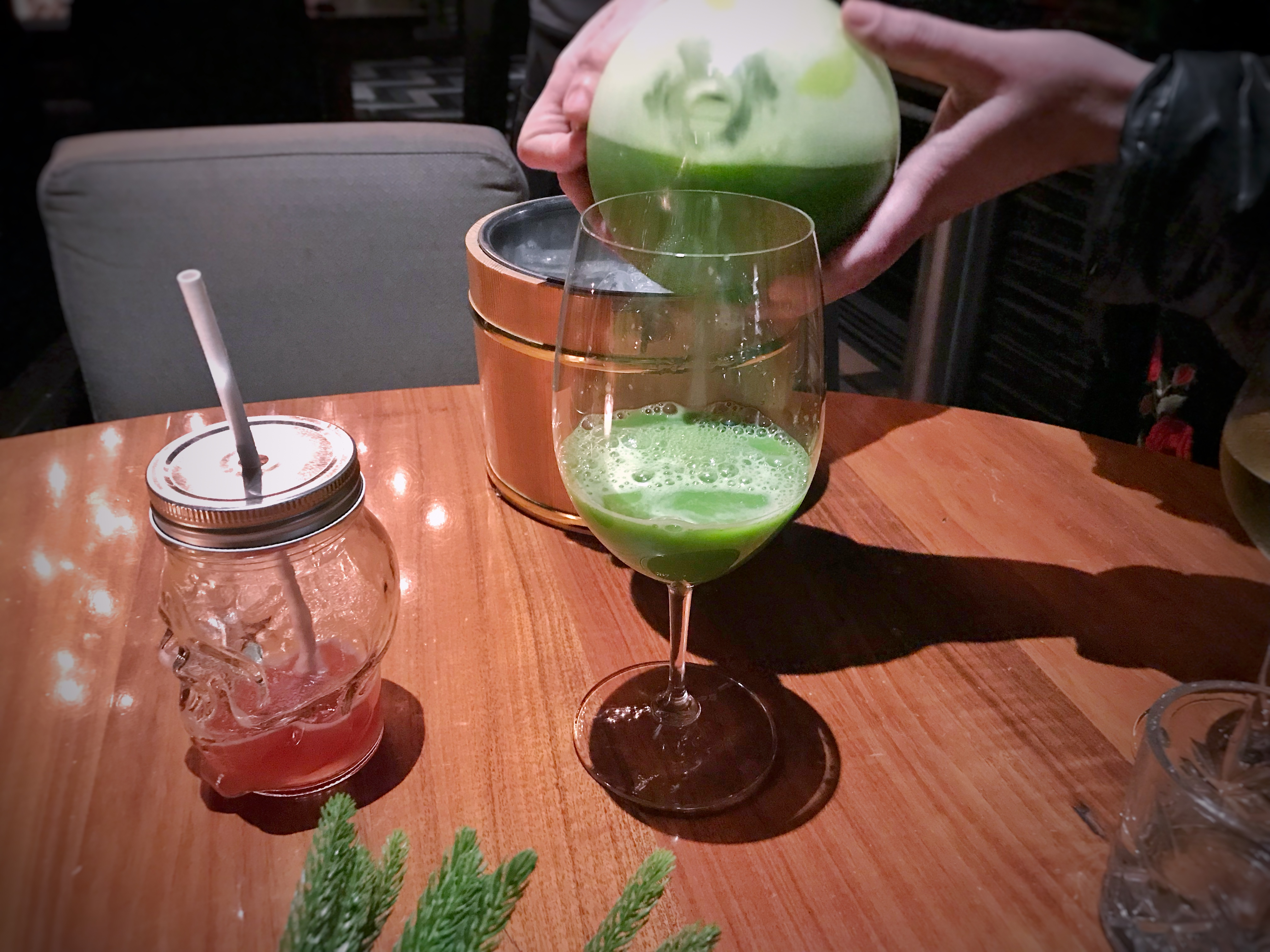
Tomato and green peas pairing drinks

== History ==
Edgar Núñez (es) founded Sud 777 in 2008 in Jardines del Pedregal, Álvaro Obregón, Mexico City. He was trained in French cuisine in restaurants like Noma, in Copenhagen, Denmark. Toledo describes the restaurant with a building style that is evocative of the 1940s and 1950s, similar to works by Luis Barragán, Max Cetto, or Antonio Attolini Lack.

In 2016, Núñez opened Comedor Jacinta in the Polanco neighborhood, in Miguel Hidalgo, Mexico City, which offers a different menu from that of Sud 777.

== Reception and recognition ==
Carlos Maribona wrote for ABC that the food breaks the mold because some hors d'oeuvres could function as desserts and vice versa, concluding that Sud 777 is the best Mexican restaurant he has visited. Glotón Mundano gave his approval to the restaurant's non-central location. Additional to the main restaurant, Julie Schwietert Collazo recommended the Kokeshi option for Afar.

On their selection of the top twenty-three restaurants in Mexico City, Time Out placed Sud 777 at number eight. The restaurant was chosen for the guide's selections by a Fodor's critic. The British company William Reed Ltd publishes the World's 50 Best Restaurants list. Since 2023, additional restaurants have been listed from position 51 to position 100. Sud 777 was ranked 70 in 2023 and 82 in 2024.

When the Michelin Guide debuted in 2024 in Mexico, it awarded 18 restaurants with Michelin stars. Sud 777 received one star, meaning "high-quality cooking, worth a stop". The guide added: "[c]hef Edgar Núñez presides over a multicourse tasting menu" and the "space is modern and sprawling, with lofted ceilings, dark wood, and earthy colors". Additionally, Comedor Jacinta received a Bib Gourmand rating, indicating "exceptionally good food at moderate prices", stating further that its "dishes are simple, but tasty, with excellent technique and abundant portions—all at a reasonable price".

Sud 777, along with six other Michelin-starred restaurants in Mexico City, was honored by Martí Batres, the head of the Mexico City government. He presented the chefs with an onyx statuette as a token of appreciation for their role in promoting tourism in the city. The statuette's design is inspired by the pre-Hispanic sculpture The Young Woman of Amajac, in recognition of the significant contributions of indigenous women to national and international gastronomy.

== See also ==
- List of French restaurants
