= Huniik =

Restaurant in Mérida, Yucatán

- Interactive map of Huniik

Restaurant information
- Established: 2019
- Owner: Roberto Solís
- Rating: (Michelin Guide, 2026)
- Location: Calle 60, 415-B, Mérida, 97000, Mexico
- Coordinates: 20°58′34.63″N 89°37′17.8″W
- Seating capacity: 16
- Website: huniik.com

Huniik (Mayan: "unique spirit") is a contemporary fine dining Yucatec restaurant in Mérida, Yucatán. It is headed by chef Roberto Solís. The restaurant has received international recognition, with praise focused on its cooking techniques and use of local ingredients, ranking in the top 100 of the World's 50 Best Restaurants list, and being featured in the travel show Eva Longoria: Searching for Mexico (2023).

Huniik received one Michelin star in 2026, meaning "high-quality cooking, worth a stop". Solís also opened next to Huniik an omakase-styled eatery named La Barra de Huniik, which also received one Michelin star.

== Description ==
Huniik serves fine dining Yucatec cuisine with an emphasis on local ingredients. It offers a twelve-course tasting menu inspired by Mayan culture and Southeastern Mexico.

The restaurant has served options like cucumber consommé, bocoles, or panuchos.

The restaurant's building has large windows, and its ambient reflects warm tones, including gold-colored rock walls and chandeliers. It has space for 16 seats and reservations are required.

== History ==
Chef Roberto Solís had previously worked at Noma, Per Se, The Fat Duck and Les Créations. He opened his first restaurant, Néctar, in 2003. He opened Huniik in 2019. Its name means "unique spirit" in Mayan.

Due to the COVID-19 pandemic in Mexico, the restaurant temporarily halted the tasting menus and provided cheaper à la carte options.

=== La Barra de Huniik ===
Solís opened an omakase-style restaurant next to Huniik named La Barra de Huniik (Spanish for The Bar of Huniik), where maize-based dishes are served.

== Reception ==
Huniik ranked 89 at the extended list of the World's 50 Best Restaurants in 2025, and 79 in 2026. The list praised the food's combination of flavors and presentations. Carolina Contreras of the Venezuelan newspaper El Universal highlighted the cooking techniques and local ingredients, praising the smoky flavors as subtle and its level of spiciness as balanced.

In 2026, the Michelin Guide expanded its Mexico coverage to include Yucatán, and Huniik was awarded one Michelin star, signifying "high-quality cooking, worth a stop". The guide praised the restaurant's ambiance, comparing it to a local cenote, and also highlighted its ingredients and cooking techniques. The guide also awared La Barra de Huniik one Michelin star.

Huniik was featured on the 2023 television show Eva Longoria: Searching for Mexico.

== See also ==
- List of Michelin-starred restaurants in Mexico
