= Xokol =

Restaurant in Guadalajara, Jalisco, Mexico

- Interactive map of Xokol

Restaurant information
- Food type: Mexican
- Rating: (Michelin Guide, 2026)
- Location: Guadalajara, Jalisco, Mexico
- Coordinates: 20°40′58.6″N 103°21′54.7″W

Xokol is a Mexican restaurant in Guadalajara, Jalisco, Mexico. It has received a Michelin star.

== See also ==
- List of Michelin-starred restaurants in Mexico
