= List of Michelin-starred restaurants in Mexico =

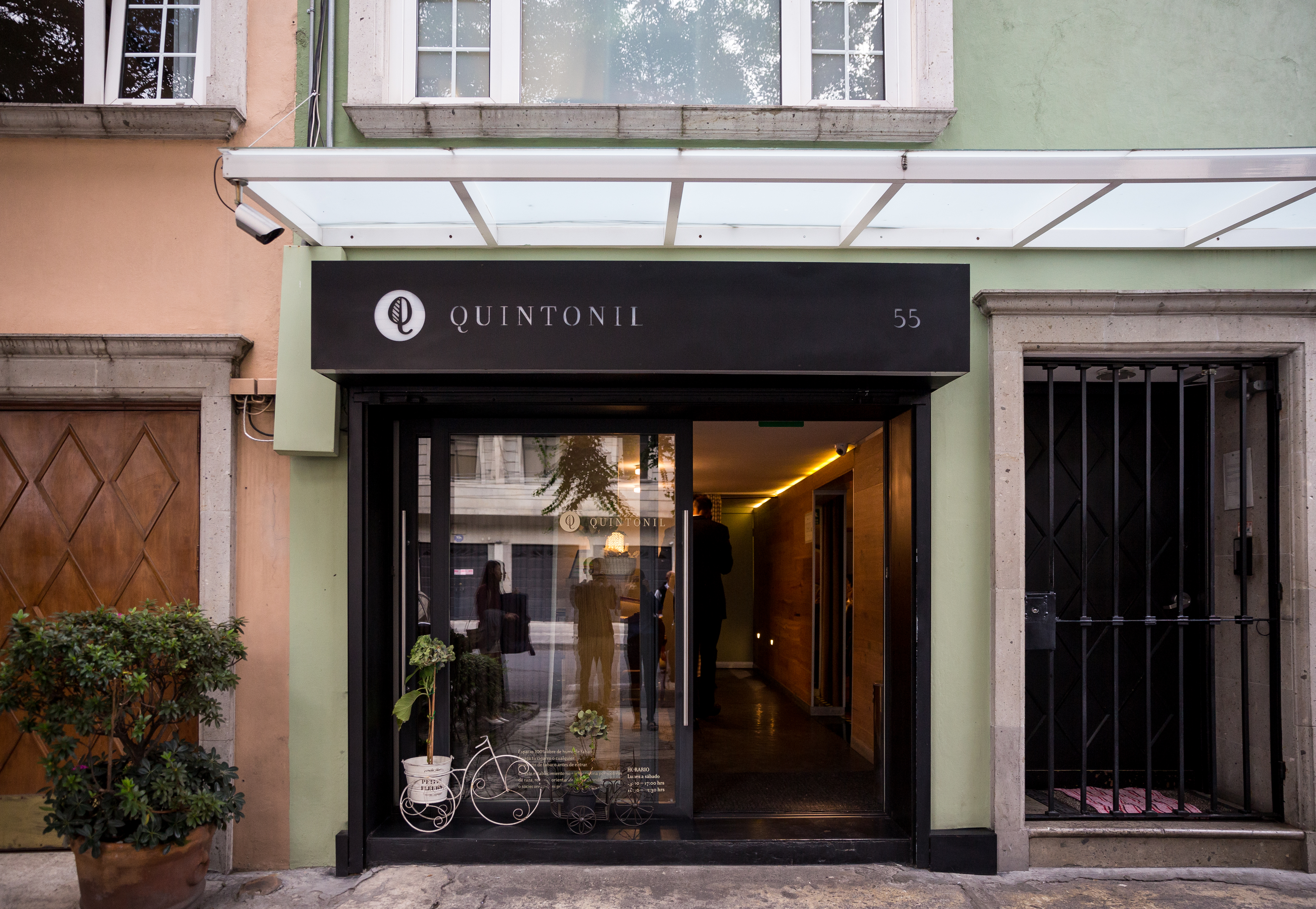
Quintonil (pictured) and Pujol became the highest-rated restaurants of 2024.

As of the 2026 Michelin Guide edition, there are 29 restaurants in Mexico with a Michelin-star rating.

The Michelin Guides have been published by the French tire company Michelin since 1900. They were designed as a guide to tell drivers about eateries they recommended to visit and to subtly sponsor their tires, by encouraging drivers to use their cars more and therefore need to replace the tires as they wore out. Over time, the stars that were given out became more valuable.

The Michelin Guide debuted in Mexico in 2024. Inspectors visited five states—Baja California, Baja California Sur, Nuevo León, Oaxaca, and Quintana Roo—and the capital city, Mexico City. Sixteen restaurants earned one star and two, Pujol and Quintonil, received two. No restaurant earned three stars. Among the awarded restaurants, Michelin included a taco stand, Taquería El Califa de León. Gwendal Poullennec, international director of the Michelin guides, said it took time to choose which restaurants to visit. He added that 11 Mexican food restaurants in other countries had one Michelin star, and two had two as of 2023.

Multiple anonymous Michelin inspectors visit the restaurants several times. They rate the restaurants on five criteria: "quality of products", "mastery of flavor and cooking techniques", "the personality of the chef represented in the dining experience", "value for money", and "consistency between inspectors' visits". Inspectors have at least ten years of expertise and create a list of popular restaurants supported by media reports, reviews, and diner popularity. If they reach a consensus, Michelin awards restaurants from one to three stars based on its evaluation methodology: One star means "high-quality cooking, worth a stop", two stars signify "excellent cooking, worth a detour", and three stars denote "exceptional cuisine, worth a special journey". The stars are not permanent and restaurants are constantly being reevaluated. If the criteria are not met, the restaurant will lose its stars.

In the second edition, in 2025, no restaurants lost their Michelin stars, and five new ones were added to the list. In 2026, the Mexico guide expanded to include the states of Jalisco, Puebla, and Yucatán. Seven restaurants received stars, while El Califa de León lost its reward.

== List ==
Key
1 Michelin star	One Michelin star
2 Michelin stars	Two Michelin stars
—	The restaurant did not receive a star that year

Michelin-starred restaurants
Name	Cuisine (Note: As established by the Michelin Guide.)	Location	2024	2025	2026
Alcalde	Mexican	Jalisco – Guadalajara	—	—	1 Michelin star
Animalón	Mexican	Baja California – Valle de Guadalupe	1 Michelin star	1 Michelin star	1 Michelin star
La Barra de Huniik	Mexican	Yucatán – Mérida	—	—	1 Michelin star
El Califa de León	Mexican	Mexico City – Cuauhtémoc	1 Michelin star	1 Michelin star	—
Le Chique	Contemporary	Quintana Roo – Riviera Maya	1 Michelin star	1 Michelin star	1 Michelin star
Cocina de Autor Los Cabos	Mexican	Baja California Sur – Los Cabos	1 Michelin star	1 Michelin star	1 Michelin star
Cocina de Autor Riviera Maya	Creative	Quintana Roo – Riviera Maya	1 Michelin star	1 Michelin star	1 Michelin star
Conchas de Piedra	Seafood	Baja California – Valle de Guadalupe	1 Michelin star	1 Michelin star	1 Michelin star
Damiana	Mexican	Baja California – Valle de Guadalupe	1 Michelin star	1 Michelin star	1 Michelin star
Los Danzantes Oaxaca	Mexican	Oaxaca – Oaxaca City	1 Michelin star	1 Michelin star	1 Michelin star
Em	Mexican	Mexico City – Cuauhtémoc	1 Michelin star	1 Michelin star	1 Michelin star
Esquina Común	Mexican	Mexico City – Cuauhtémoc	1 Michelin star	1 Michelin star	1 Michelin star
Expendio de Maíz	Mexican	Mexico City – Cuauhtémoc	—	1 Michelin star	1 Michelin star
Gaba	Mexican	Mexico City – Cuauhtémoc	—	—	1 Michelin star
Ha'	Mexican	Quintana Roo – Playa del Carmen	1 Michelin star	1 Michelin star	1 Michelin star
Huniik	Mexican	Yucatán – Mérida	—	—	1 Michelin star
Ixi'im	Mexican	Yucatán – Chocholá	—	—	1 Michelin star
Koli Cocina de Origen	Mexican	Nuevo León – Monterrey	1 Michelin star	1 Michelin star	1 Michelin star
Levadura de Olla	Mexican	Oaxaca – Oaxaca City	1 Michelin star	1 Michelin star	1 Michelin star
Lunario	Mexican	Baja California – El Porvenir	—	1 Michelin star	1 Michelin star
Masala y Maíz	Fusion	Mexico City – Cuauhtémoc	—	1 Michelin star	1 Michelin star
Máximo	Mexican	Mexico City – Cuauhtémoc	—	1 Michelin star	1 Michelin star
Olivea Farm to Table	Contemporary	Baja California – Ensenada	—	1 Michelin star	1 Michelin star
La Once Mil	Mexican	Mexico City – Miguel Hidalgo	—	—	1 Michelin star
Pangea	Contemporary	Nuevo León – San Pedro Garza García	1 Michelin star	1 Michelin star	1 Michelin star
Pujol	Mexican	Mexico City – Miguel Hidalgo	2 Michelin stars	2 Michelin stars	2 Michelin stars
Quintonil	Mexican	Mexico City – Miguel Hidalgo	2 Michelin stars	2 Michelin stars	2 Michelin stars
Rosetta	Creative	Mexico City – Cuauhtémoc	1 Michelin star	1 Michelin star	1 Michelin star
Sud 777	Creative	Mexico City – Álvaro Obregón	1 Michelin star	1 Michelin star	1 Michelin star
Xokol	Mexican	Jalisco – Guadalajara	—	—	1 Michelin star
Reference(s)					

== See also ==
- List of Michelin Bib Gourmand restaurants in Mexico
- List of restaurants in Mexico
