= Pangea (restaurant) =

Restaurant in Nuevo León, Mexico

- Interactive map of Pangea

Restaurant information
- Chef: Guillermo González Beristáin
- Rating: (Michelin Guide, 2024)
- Location: Nuevo León, Mexico
- Coordinates: 25°38′58.2″N 100°21′23″W

Pangea is a restaurant in Nuevo León, Mexico. Guillermo González Beristáin is the chef. The restaurant serves Mexican cuisine with Asian and French influence, and has received a Michelin star.

== See also ==
- List of Mexican restaurants
- List of Michelin-starred restaurants in Mexico
