= Conchas de Piedra =

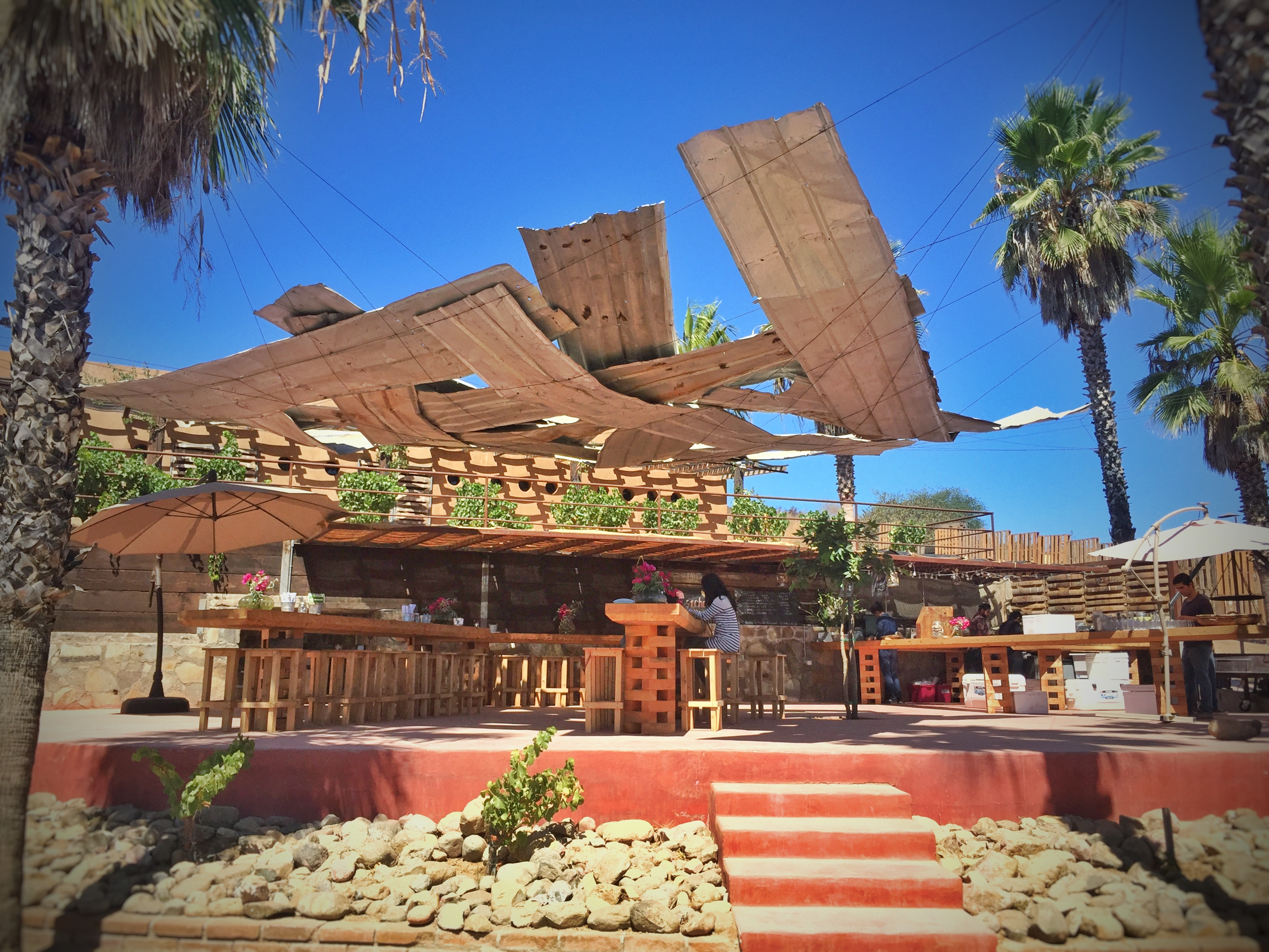
- The restaurant in 2016
- Interactive map of Conchas de Piedra

Restaurant information
- Rating: (Michelin Guide, 2024)
- Location: Valle de Guadalupe, Baja California, Mexico
- Coordinates: 31°58′48″N 116°39′11″W

Conchas de Piedra is a restaurant in Valle de Guadalupe, Baja California, Mexico. It serves Mexican cuisine and seafood, and has received a Michelin star.

== See also ==
- List of Mexican restaurants
- List of Michelin-starred restaurants in Mexico
- List of seafood restaurants
