= Carlos Gaytán =

Mexican chef and restaurateur

- Born: October 20, 1970 (age 56); Huitzuco, Guerrero, Mexico
- Occupations: Chef and restaurateur

Carlos Gaytán is a Mexican chef and restaurateur currently residing in Chicago. He is known as the first Mexican-born chef to earn a Michelin star for his restaurant Mexique, and for other restaurants that he owns, including Ha' and Tzuco. He was formerly a competitor in Top Chef: New Orleans, finishing fifth.
