= Mexique (restaurant) =

Defunct restaurant in Chicago, Illinois, U.S.

- Interactive map of Mexique

Restaurant information
- Established: May 2008
- Closed: May 2018
- Location: 1529 W. Chicago Avenue, Chicago, Illinois, 60642, United States
- Coordinates: 41°53′45.5″N 87°39′57.7″W

Mexique was a Michelin-starred French-Mexican restaurant in Chicago's West Town. Chef Carlos Gaytán opened it in May 2008. The restaurant received one Michelin star in 2013 and retained it in 2014, making Gaytán the first Mexican-born chef to lead a Michelin-starred restaurant. It closed in May 2018 after a decade in operation.

== See also ==
- List of defunct restaurants of the United States
- List of Michelin-starred restaurants in Chicago
- List of Michelin Bib Gourmand restaurants in the United States
