= Le Chique =

Mexican restaurant in Puerto Morelos, Quintana Roo

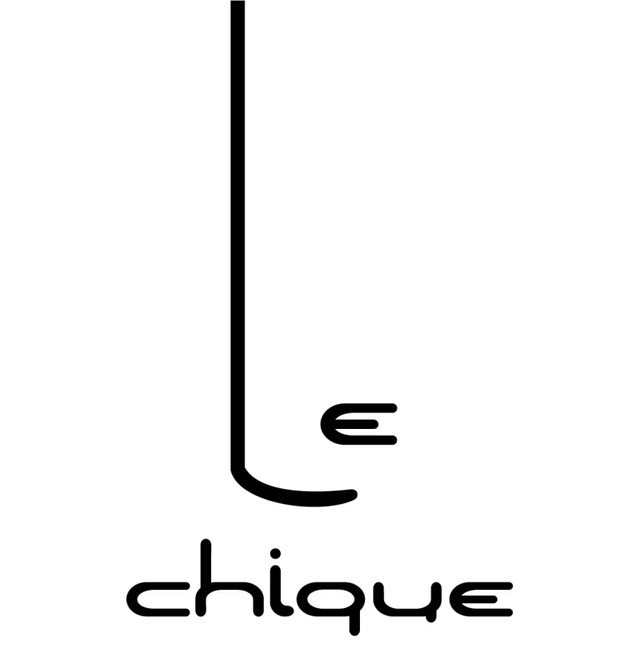
- Interactive map of Le Chique

Restaurant information
- Food type: Mexican
- Rating: (Michelin Guide, 2024)
- Location: Puerto Morelos, Quintana Roo, Mexico
- Coordinates: 20°53′44.5″N 86°51′26.5″W

Le Chique is a contemporary Mexican restaurant in the Azul Beach Resort, in Puerto Morelos, Quintana Roo, Mexico. It has received a Michelin star.

== See also ==
- List of Mexican restaurants
- List of Michelin-starred restaurants in Mexico
- List of restaurants in Mexico
