= La Once Mil =

Restaurant in Mexico City, Mexico

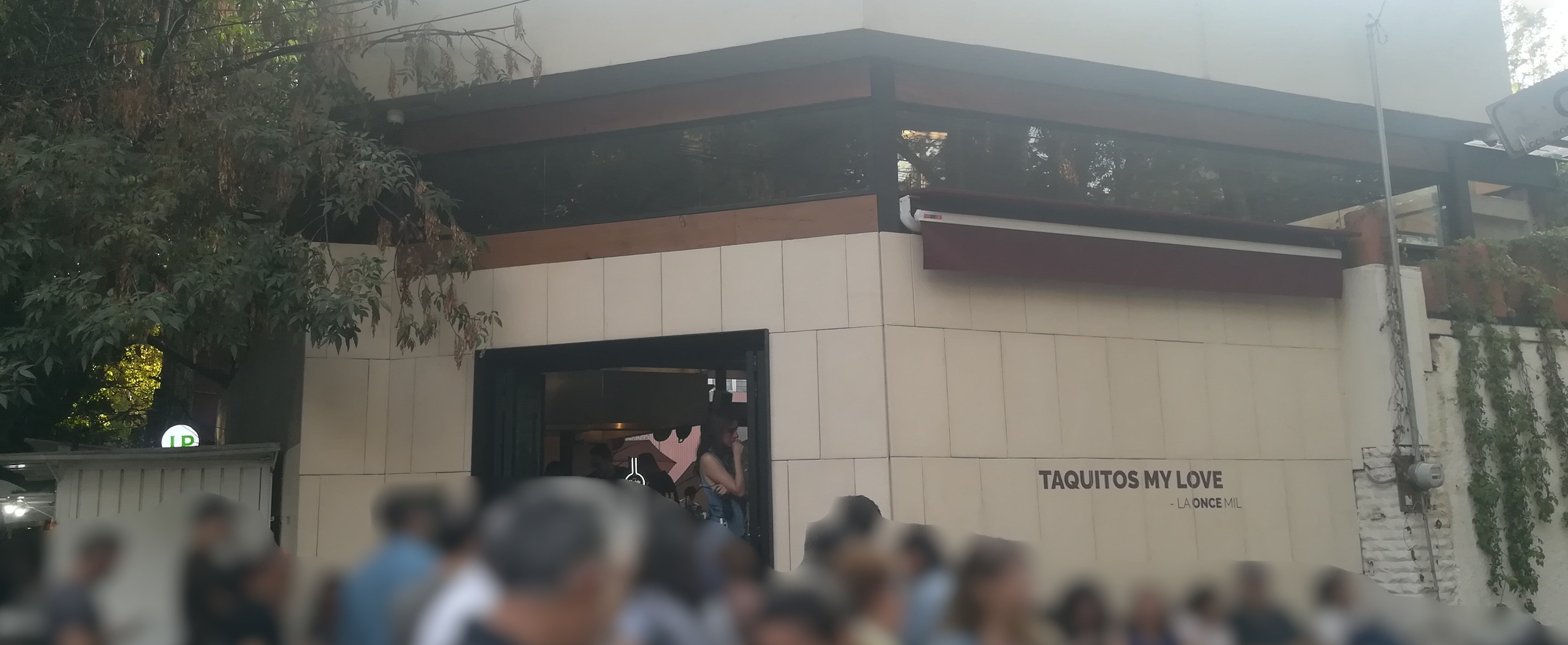
- La Once Mil in Colonia Roma

Restaurant information
- Established: 2024
- Owner: César de la Parra
- Food type: Mexican (antojitos)
- Dress code: None
- Rating: (Michelin Guide, 2026)
- Location: Monte Everest 780, Lomas de Chapultepec, Mexico City (19°25′05″N 99°12′56″W); Orizaba 83, Roma Norte, Mexico City (19°25′11.96″N 99°9′37.15″W); Fernando VI 16, Centro, Madrid (40°25′26.92″N 3°41′42.44″W)
- Reservations: Yes (Madrid)
- Website: La Once Mil on Instagram

La Once Mil (Note: Spanish pronunciation: [la ˈonse mil]; "eleven thousand".) is a gourmet taqueria in Mexico City. It is owned by chef César de la Parra, who opened it in 2024 in Lomas de Chapultepec. Other franchises were opened in Colonia Roma, also in Mexico City, and Madrid, Spain. The Lomas de Chapultepec taqueria received one Michelin star in the third Michelin Guide covering Mexico in 2026.

== Description ==
La Once Mil is a gourmet taqueria, a restaurant specialized in tacos and other antojitos—Mexican street food.

Beef tacos offered include carne asada, arrachera, picaña, Wagyu, lechón, or ribeye steak. Non-beef options include bass al pastor and vegan alternatives. The tortillas are handmade and come in different varieties. The restaurant offers sauces ranging in spiciness.

Beside tacos, the taqueria serves tostadas, including spicy tuna or ceviche varieties, quesadillas, noodle soup, or Caesar's salad. Desserts include sorbets, ice creams and meringues.

== History ==
César de la Parra opened in 2024 the first La Once Mil restaurant in Lomas de Chapultepec, an affluent neighborhood in Miguel Hidalgo. He opened it with two associates, Enrique Glennie and Jimena Gutiérrez. According to them, the idea for the taqueria was to serve tacos of higher quality than the traditional street version.

De la Parra said he wanted to open a taqueria for his wife as a honeymoon promise. The name for La Once Mil comes from the postal code serving Lomas de Chapultepec, 11000.

A second restaurant was opened in Colonia Roma, also in the city. A third restaurant was opened in September 2026 in Madrid, Spain, in collaboration with local chefs.

== Reception ==
A reviewer for the Marco Beteta travel guide commented that the prices are higher than those at street taquerias, which prompted discussion, attributing them to the quality of the ingredients.

In 2026, La Once Mil received one Michelin star in 2026, meaning "high-quality cooking, worth a stop", praising the food preparation.

== See also ==
- List of Mexican restaurants
- List of Michelin-starred restaurants in Mexico
