= Chilhuacle =

Strain of chili (Capsicum)

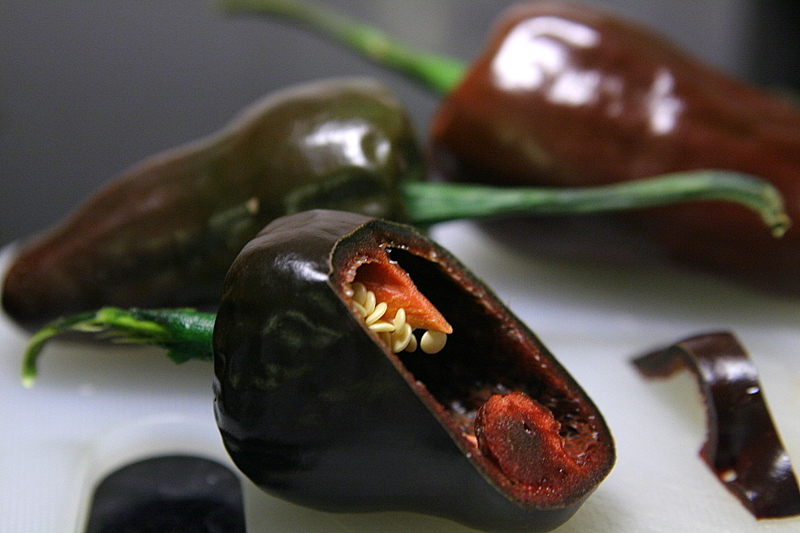
- Species: Capsicum annuum
- Cultivar: 'Chilhuacle'
- Origin: Oaxaca, Mexico
- Heat: Medium
- Scoville scale: 3000 SHU

The chile huacle or chilhuacle pepper (from Nahuatl chilli 'chile' and 'huactli' old) is a variety of Capsicum annuum produced in the Cañada region of Oaxaca, Mexico. Now one of the rarest chiles in Mexico, the chilhuacle is also one of the original peppers used in Oaxacan mole recipes, particularly mole negro but including other dishes such as chileajo, chanfaina, clemole and chile caldo. The chilhuacle pepper comes in three varieties -- yellow (amarillo), black (negro), and red (rojo), the latter of which is sometimes also called chilcostle.

Due to production costs and decreasing farming, the chilhuacle is currently the most expensive pepper in Mexico, with a market price of $500 pesos per kilogram, or between 25 and 38 US dollars.. For contrast, as of 2026, the habanero is usually priced between $1.73 and $4.09 US dollars.

== Cultivation ==
The chilhuacle pepper plant has an erect posture and forks into two equal branches, with an average height of 145 cm. It has a typical root system with a large number of secondary roots. The average length from the cotyledon to first flower is about 30 cm, and the oval-shaped green leaves average 10.3 cm in length and 9.2 cm in width, although both measurements can be greater in greenhouse environments rather than field cultivation. Flowers are white with purple anthers, a white filament, and six petals. The chile itself is trapezoidal in shape, and starts out as green before ripening and turning either a dark, shiny brown (chilhuacle negro), red (chilhuacle rojo) or yellowish-gold (chilhuacle amarillo). The stems contain anthocyanin. After harvest, the peppers are dried in direct sunlight.

Currently, the chilhuacle is only grown in Cañada, Oaxaca, where it is grown primarily by the Cuicatecos and Chinatecos Indigenous peoples who inhabit the region. The pepper is grown in small quantities, with a total area of less than 10 hectares dedicated to its growth. Cultivation takes 185-195 days, with 35-45 days for the seedling stage, 90 days for maturing, and 60 days for harvest. This means that seeds are germinated at the end of the dry season (May), transplanted to the fields in June and July during the rainy season, and harvested once the rainy season is over. The use of traditional farming practices almost exclusively in farming chilhuacle, however, is a contributor to its slow disappearance -- chilhuacle crops are often threatened by pests and viral diseases, and markets as a result are moving away towards more accessible and less expensive peppers.

== Use and history ==
The most famous use for the chilhuacle is in mole negro, a Oaxacan dish made with chocolate, spices, toasted chilhuacle negro, and burnt tortillas. Chilhuacle rojo or chilcostle is used for mole rojo and manchamanteles; chilhuacle amarillo is used for mole amarillo. However, mole negro serves a special role, prepared to celebrate patron saints, to honor the departed, and for funerals. Texmole is made with the fresh chilhuacle negro peppers.

An anonymous manuscript dated to 1829 names the chilhuacle in more than 25 recipes, including chileajo, manchamanteles, mal asado, chanfaina, estofado, clemole, and moleprieto (a precursor to mole negro).
