= Taquería El Califa de León =

Mexican restaurant in Mexico City

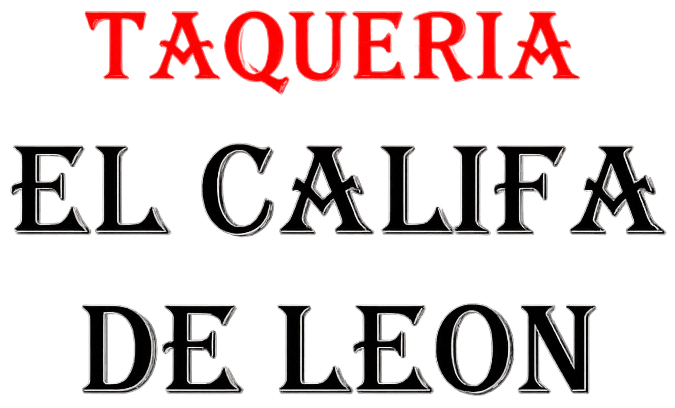

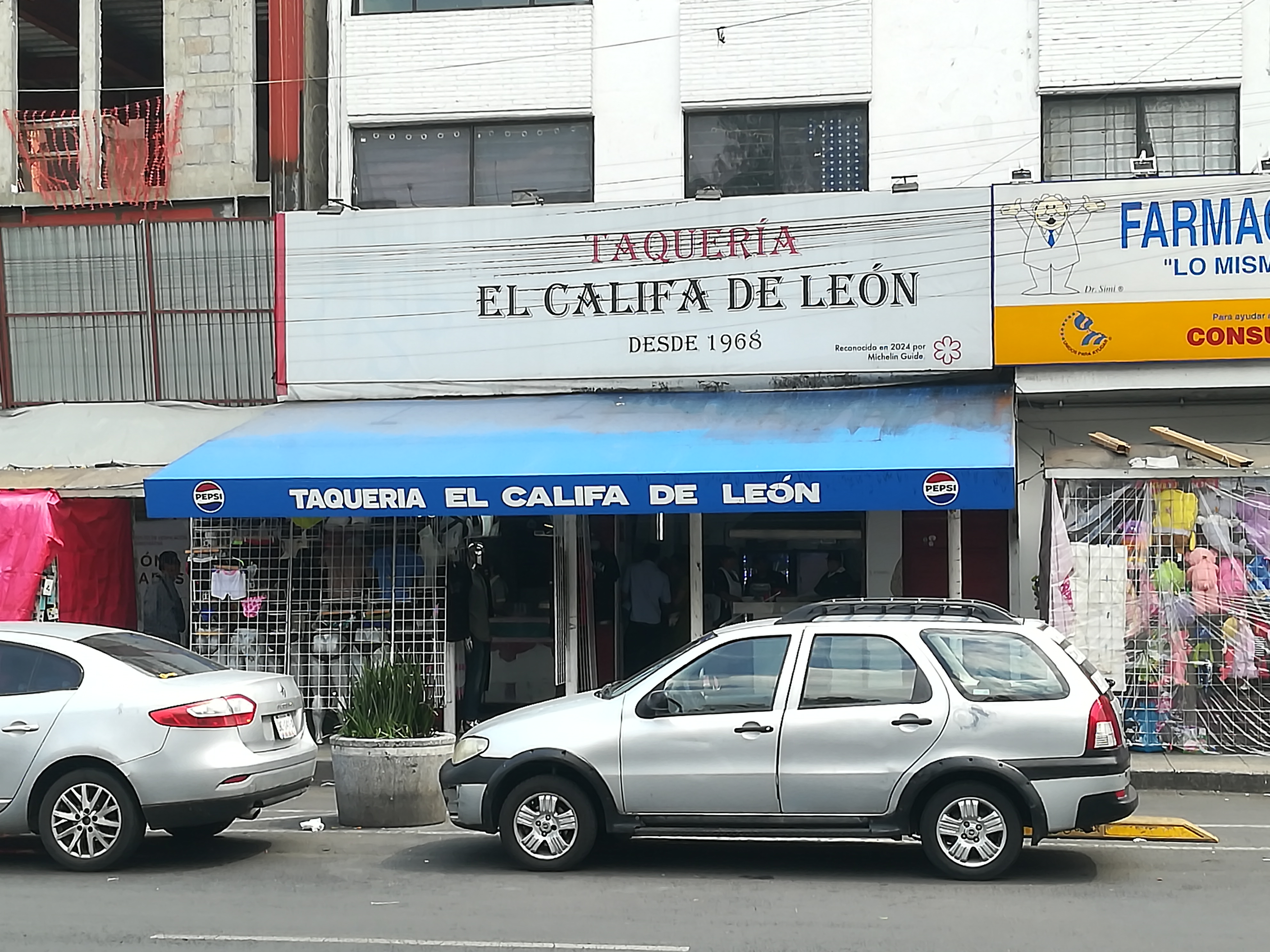
- The taqueria's entrance in 2026
- Interactive map of Taquería El Califa de León

Restaurant information
- Established: 1968
- Owner: Mario Hernández Alonso
- Food type: Antojito
- Rating: Michelin Star Lost
- Location: Av. Ribera de San Cosme 56, San Rafael, Cuauhtémoc, Mexico City, 06470, Mexico
- Coordinates: 19°26′28″N 99°9′33″W
- Website: Taquería El Califa de León on Instagram

Taquería El Califa de León is a taqueria in Colonia San Rafael, Cuauhtémoc, Mexico City. It was founded in 1968 by Juan Hernández González. Its menu is limited to a small variety of beef tacos made with hand-made tortillas. The restaurant received a Michelin star in 2024, the first Mexican taco stand so awarded. The taquería lost its only Michelin star in May 2026.

== History ==
The taquero of El Califa de León cooking at the grill

The restaurant was opened in 1968 by Juan Hernández González and is named after the nickname of bullfighter Rodolfo Gaona. Most of the restaurant's small footprint—variously cited as 100 square feet (9.3 m^{2}) or 50 square metres (540 ft^{2})—is dominated by the large grill while customers cram into the other half, where there is no seating. The sidewalk outside is occupied by street vendors, further limiting capacity.

A noted regular in the 1980s and early 1990s was Luis Donaldo Colosio, later a Mexican presidential candidate who was assassinated in 1994. Framed on one wall is a 1993 column from the newspaper Ovaciones in which the author recounts running into Colosio and states, "[i]t's the most egalitarian eatery in Mexico. Everyone eats standing, dripping salsa on the stools, whiffed by sleepless dogs." Other politicians, including Eruviel Ávila, Miguel Ángel Osorio Chong, Humberto Moreira Valdés, and Carlos Salinas de Gortari, were known to be regular customers; the restaurant is four blocks and 650 meters (2,130 ft), nine minutes' walk, from the national headquarters of the Institutional Revolutionary Party (PRI).

The name "El Califa" was never trademarked, and a 15-unit taco chain in the Mexico City area is also known as El Califa. In 2017, the stand reported that it had struggled since operator and founder's son Mario Hernández Alonso's death in 2002 due to competition with other taco stands, security issues in the area, and the cost of the dishes.

== Menu ==
Bisteck tacos at El Califa de León

The menu has remained much the same; Hernández González told his son, Mario Hernández Alonso, that it was not worth expanding because "avarice rips the bag". Its signature taco, the Gaonera, is named for Gaona; it is one of three items on the menu, alongside steak and rib tacos. Tacos are prepared with handmade tortillas. Drinks are soft drinks or juices. The Gaonera taco, the most popular taco at the stand, is made from a filet mignon steak that is grilled with grain salt and lime. Diners can season their orders with salsa verde or roja.

== Reception ==
The two Michelin stars awarded to the taquería hang beside the menu right at the stand's entrance

In Marco Beteta's opinion, the hand-made tortillas and tacos were excellent and well worth the price. Writing for the Los Angeles Times, Alonso Ruvalcaba listed El Califa de León as a place to go for tacos.

On 15 May 2024, El Califa de León was awarded a Michelin star, indicating "high-quality cooking, worth a stop"—the first time a Mexican taco stand had received such a distinction. The announcement praised the Gaonera's beef fillet and corn tortillas as an "elemental and pure" combination. The news caused crowds and long lines to form outside the restaurant. As a result, the restaurant's revenues increased, it employed additional staff members, and adjacent businesses profited.

El Califa de León, along with six other Michelin-starred restaurants in Mexico City, was honored by Martí Batres, the head of the Mexico City government. He presented the chefs with an onyx statuette as a token of appreciation for their role in promoting tourism in the city. The statuette's design is inspired by the pre-Hispanic sculpture The Young Woman of Amajac, in recognition of the significant contributions of indigenous women to national and international gastronomy.

In 2026, El Califa de León lost its star.

== See also ==
- List of Michelin-starred restaurants in Mexico
