= Gaba (restaurant) =

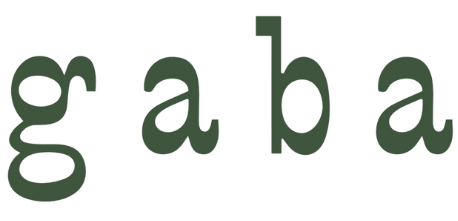

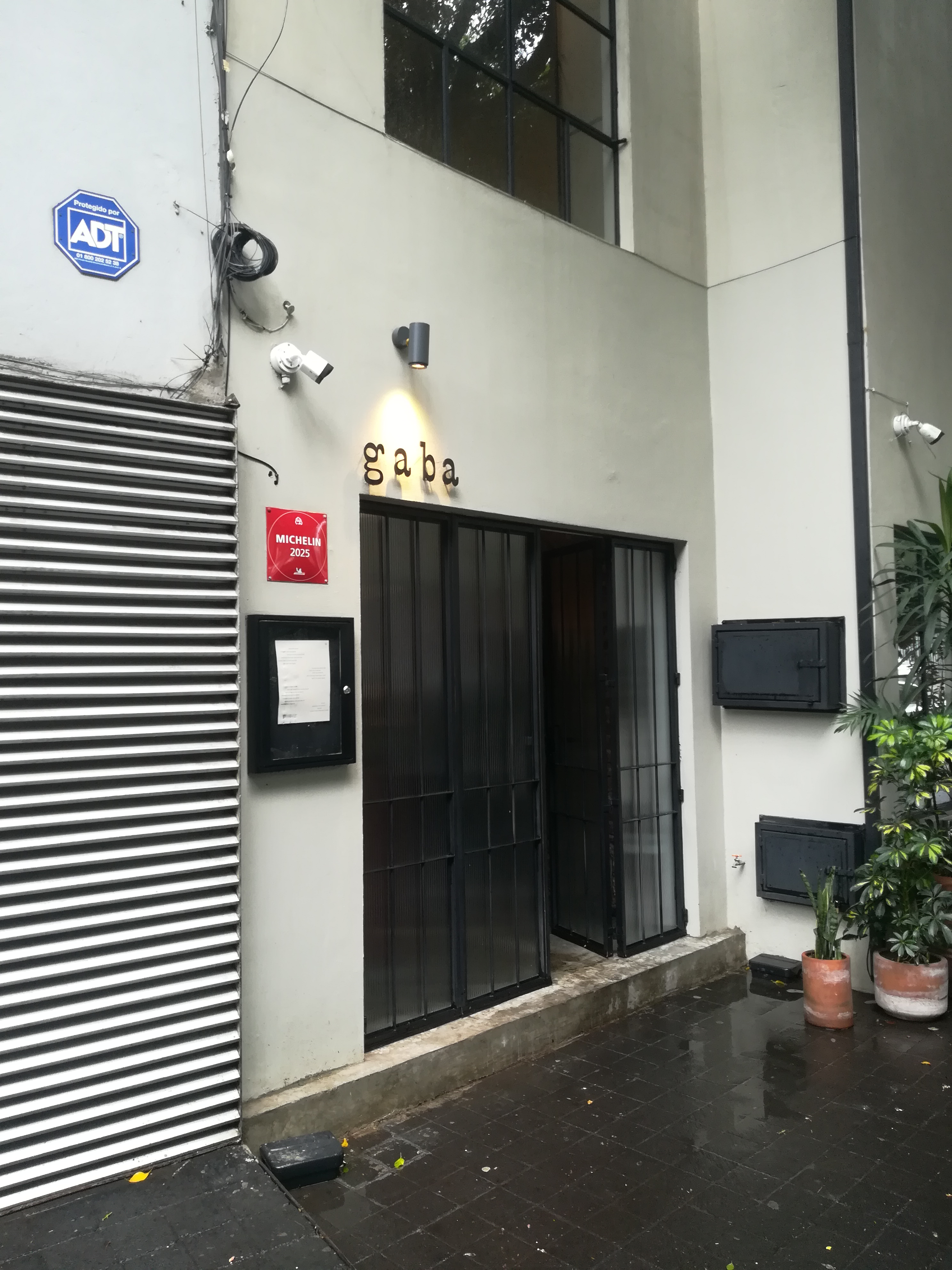
- The restaurant in 2026
- Interactive map of Gaba

Restaurant information
- Chef: Victor Toriz Sánchez
- Food type: Mexican
- Rating: (Michelin Guide, 2026)
- Location: Mexico City, Mexico
- Coordinates: 19°24′33.7″N 99°10′46.4″W

Gaba is a Mexican restaurant in Mexico City. It has received a Michelin star. Victor Toriz Sánchez is the chef.

== See also ==
- List of Mexican restaurants
- List of Michelin-starred restaurants in Mexico
