= Koli Cocina de Origen =

Mexican restaurant in Monterrey, Mexico

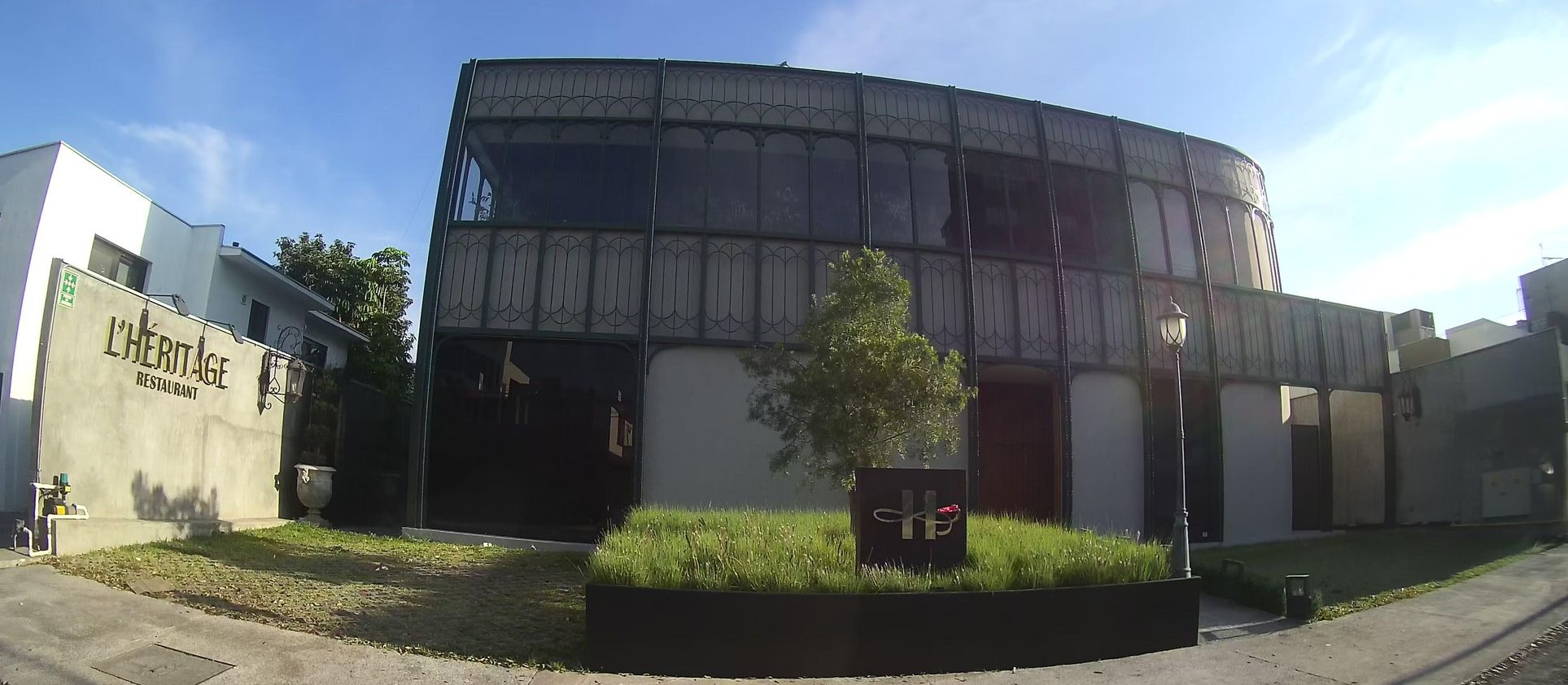
- Exterior of Koli (pictured in 2020), which at the time was operated by the restaurant L'héritage
- Interactive map of Koli Cocina de Origen

Restaurant information
- Food type: Mexican
- Rating: (Michelin Guide, 2024)
- Location: Monterrey, Nuevo León, Mexico
- Coordinates: 25°39′35.482″N 100°21′46.818″W

Koli Cocina de Origen (stylized as KOLI) is a Mexican restaurant in Monterrey, Nuevo León, Mexico. It has received a Michelin star.

== See also ==
- List of Mexican restaurants
- List of Michelin-starred restaurants in Mexico
