= Damiana (restaurant) =

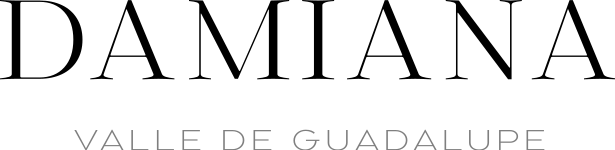
- Interactive map of Damiana

Restaurant information
- Food type: Mexican
- Rating: (Michelin Guide, 2024)
- Location: Valle de Guadalupe, Baja California, Mexico
- Coordinates: 32°08′17″N 116°31′46″W

Damiana is a Mexican restaurant in Valle de Guadalupe, Baja California, Mexico. It has received a Michelin star.

== See also ==
- List of Mexican restaurants
- List of Michelin-starred restaurants in Mexico
