= Ha' (restaurant) =

Mexican restaurant in Playa del Carmen, Mexico

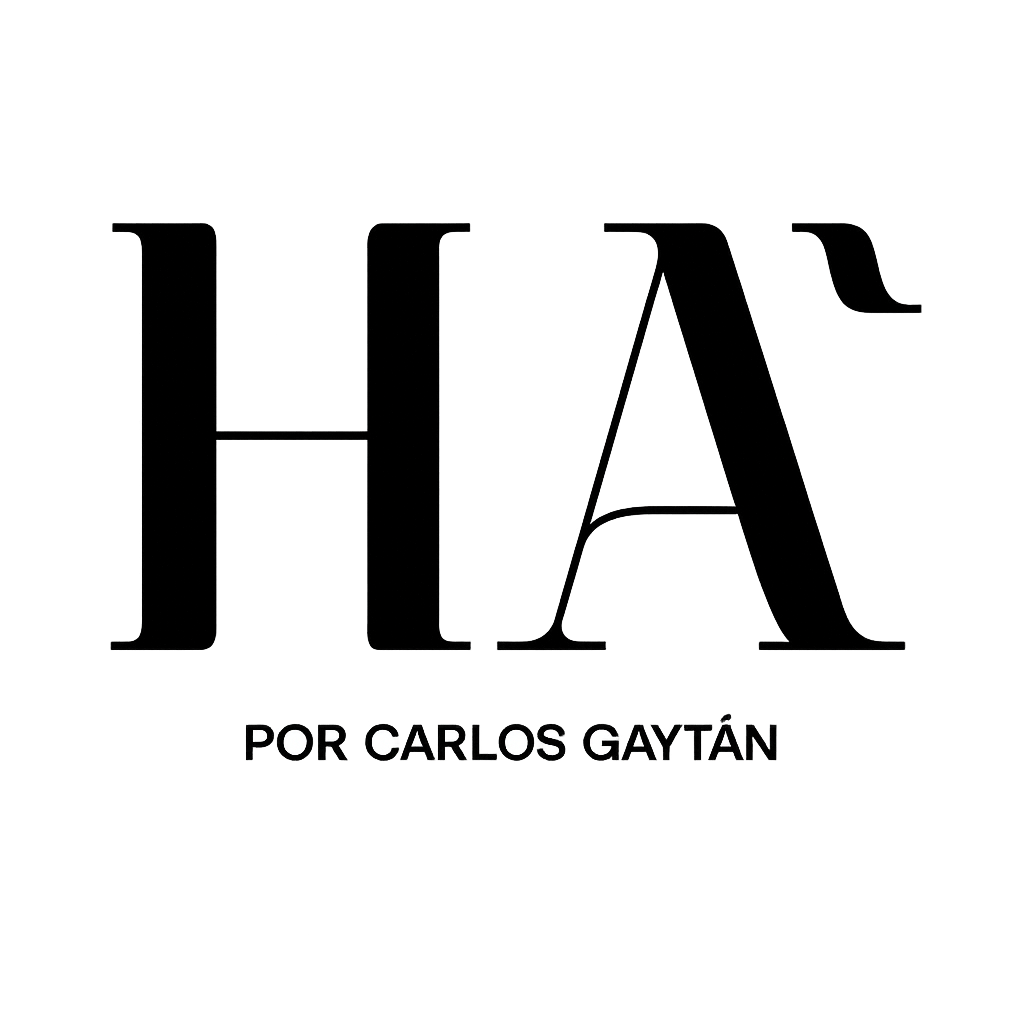

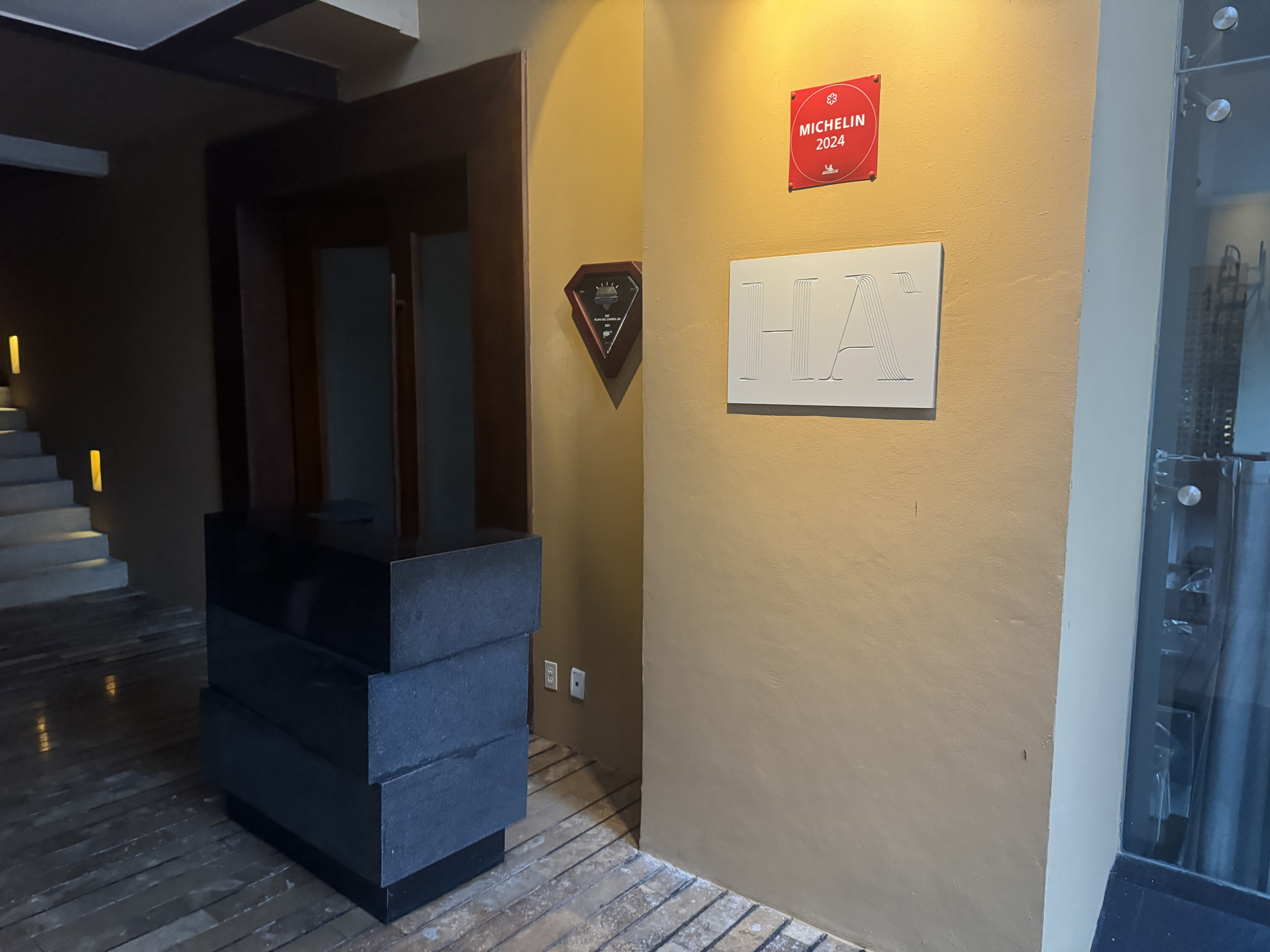
- The restaurant in 2025
- Interactive map of Ha'

Restaurant information
- Chef: Carlos Gaytán
- Rating: (Michelin Guide, 2024)
- Location: Playa del Carmen, Quintana Roo, Mexico
- Coordinates: 20°35′11.5″N 87°06′43.5″W

Ha' is a Mexican restaurant at Playa del Carmen's Hotel Xcaret, in Quintana Roo, Mexico. Carlos Gaytán is the chef. The restaurant has received a Michelin star.

== See also ==
- List of Michelin-starred restaurants in Mexico
- List of restaurants in Mexico
