= Olivea Farm to Table =

Restaurant in Ensenada, Baja California, Mexico

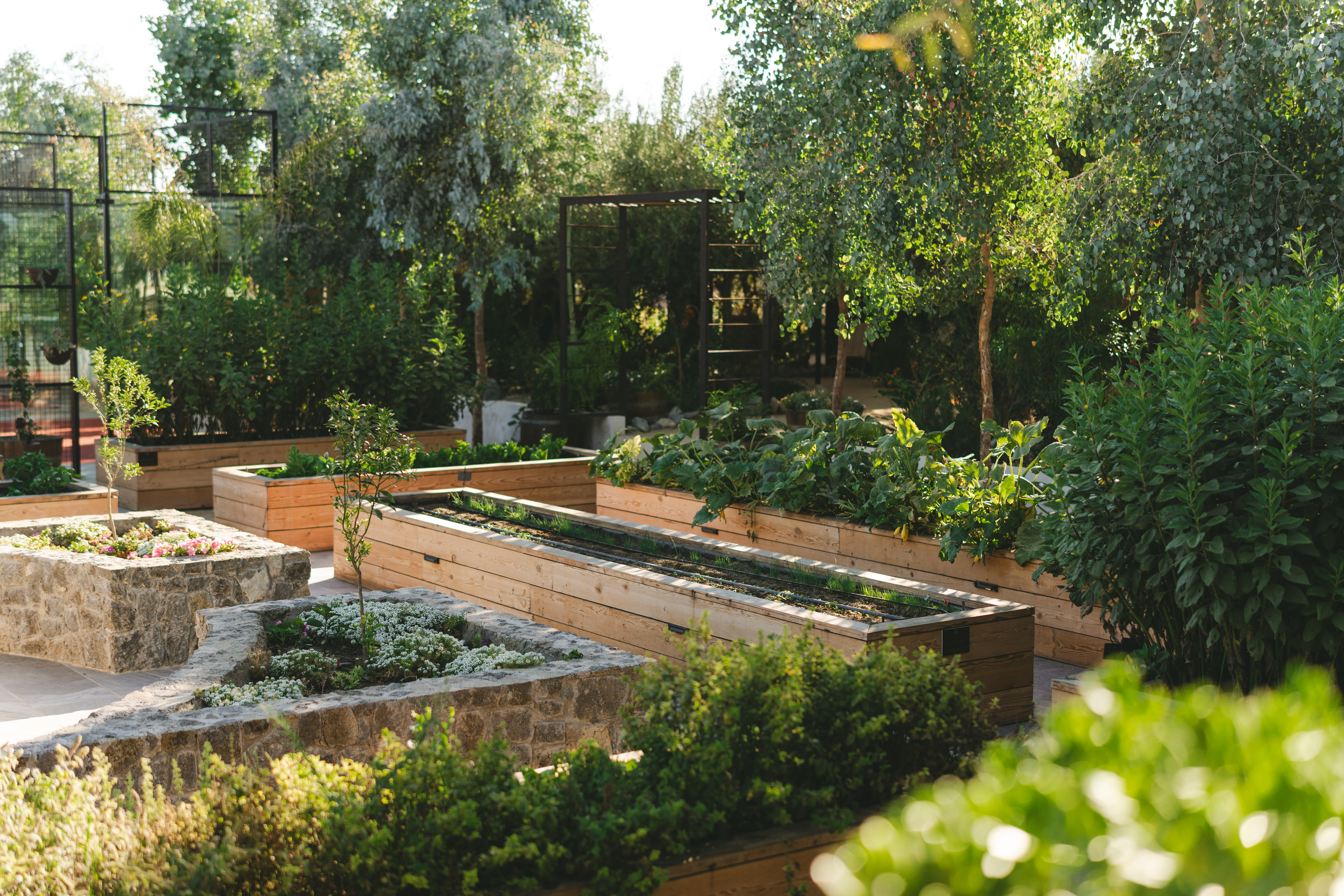
- The restaurant's kitchen garden
- Interactive map of Olivea Farm to Table

Restaurant information
- Established: 2023
- Owner: Ange Joy
- Manager: Adriana Rose
- Head chef: Daniel Nates
- Food type: Mexican
- Rating: (Michelin Guide, 2025–present); (Michelin Guide, defunct)
- Location: Carretera Ensenada-Tecate Km 92.5, Villa de Juárez, Valle de Guadalupe, Ensenada, Baja California, 22766, Mexico
- Coordinates: 31°59′27″N 116°38′30″W
- Website: oliveafarmtotable.com

Olivea Farm to Table is a Mexican restaurant in Valle de Guadalupe, Mexico. Built in the space formerly administered by a roadside hotel, the establishment was reconditioned by Ange Joy and Miguel Ángel Díaz as a hospitality venture that includes the restaurant, a hotel and a café.

The restaurant serves seasonal, farm-to-table menus, primarily focused on vegetables sourced from its own kitchen garden and seafood from the nearby Gulf of California. Olivea Farm to Table received one Michelin star in the second Michelin Guide covering restaurants in Mexico, and a green star for its sustainability practices.

== Description ==
Olivea serves a seasonal farm-to-table tasting menus with ingredients sourced from the adjacent kitchen garden. The restaurant is found in Ensenada, Baja California. Fish and other marine species are sourced from the Gulf of California. The wine pairing selections are from the Valle de Guadalupe wine region, also in Ensenada. Between courses, waiters offer raw vegetables, with the aim of allowing guests can distinguish their natural flavors from those of the prepared dishes.

Menus are updated every six weeks according to the seasonality of the ingredients. Tasting menus can be served either with marine protein or solely vegetables. Menu options have included bluefin tuna served with leche de tigre and sea urchin; oysters served with red mole and daikon; or duck dishes served with cannelloni with kohlrabi, or carrots, pumpkin, and kale. The restaurant also offers à la carte options.

Inside Olivea, there are wood tables, and plants as decorative elements.

== History ==
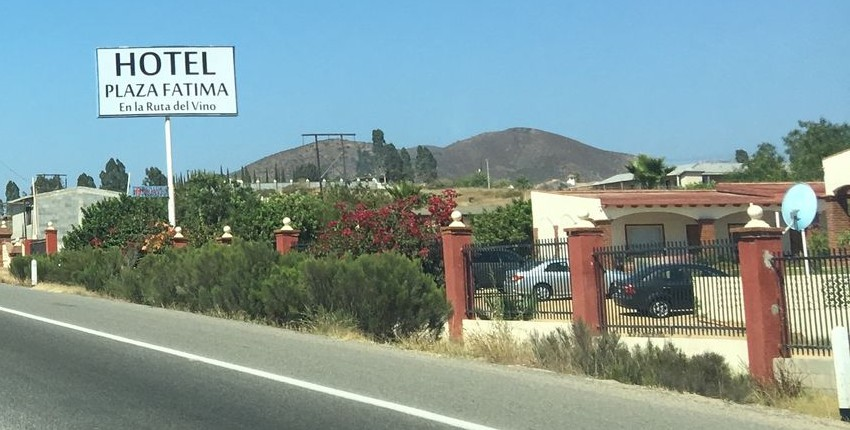
The location as seen in 2017, formerly operated by a different business.

Olivea was opened in 2023 by Miguel Ángel Díaz and Ange Joy de Díaz; the latter designed the place. They acquired a former roadside hotel. The restaurant was built between December 2022 and September 2023, as part of a hospitality venture that includes Café Olivea (formerly Café del Huerto) and Casa Olivea (formerly MYA, a boutique hotel). Olivea Farm to Table first operated as a grill restaurant.

Adriana Rose, Joy's daughter, is the chief executive, and Daniel Nates is the restaurant's executive chef as of 2026. Other chefs that have worked there have included Eduardo Zaragoza and Rafael Magaña.

Regarding the restaurant's sustainability, the establishment uses solar power for operations, composts food waste and adds it to the soil as a source of nutrients, and uses recycled graywater for the irrigation of species such as lavender or yucca, which is done using dripping methods. According to the staff, no pesticides are used, preferring aromatic infusions instead.

== Reception ==
In 2025, Michelin Guide covered Baja California and Olivea Farm to Table received one Michelin star and a Michelin Green Star for its sustainability. In the same year, Food & Wine en Español named Zaragoza one of the Best New Chefs in Mexico.

The guide's review describes the food's flavor as "simple" and "pure". The restaurant was recommended by The Wall Street Journal, and included in Marco Beteta's 2026 list of the 100 best restaurants in Mexico.

== See also ==
- List of Michelin-starred restaurants in Mexico
