= Clemole =

Traditional dish in Mexican cuisine

Clemole or tlemole is a traditional dish in Mexican cuisine. It is a soup where meat, vegetables and strong flavor elements are combined. When beef or poultry meat is fried and boiled in a stock pot, then green beans, corn chunks and zucchini pieces are added. Chili peppers are roasted, soaked in hot water and ground on a metate with a little garlic, cloves and black pepper. This is fried in oil or lard with a few onion slices, making a sauce that is added to the broth, which should not be too thick.

== See also ==
- List of soups
