= San Mateo Yucutindoo =

San Mateo Yucutindoo Zapotitlán del Río
- Municipality
- Location within Oaxaca Location within Mexico
- Coordinates: 16°53′N 97°14′W
- Country: Mexico
- State: Oaxaca

Government
  - Federal electoral district: Oaxaca's 6th

Area
  - Total: 197.8 km^{2} (76.4 sq mi)

Population (2020)
  - Total: 3,144
- Time zone: UTC-6 (Zona Centro)

San Mateo Yucutindoo is a municipality in Oaxaca in southern Mexico. Its seat is the town of Zapotitlán del Río. The municipality covers an area of 197.8 km^{2}. It is part of the Sola de Vega District in the Sierra Sur Region.

The municipality was originally incorporated as Zapotitlán del Río, and changed its name to San Mateo Yucutindoo by decree of the Congress of Oaxaca in 2012.

As of 2020, the municipality had a total population of 3,144.
