= Chocholá Municipality =

Municipality in the Mexican state of Yucatán

Chocholá
- Municipality
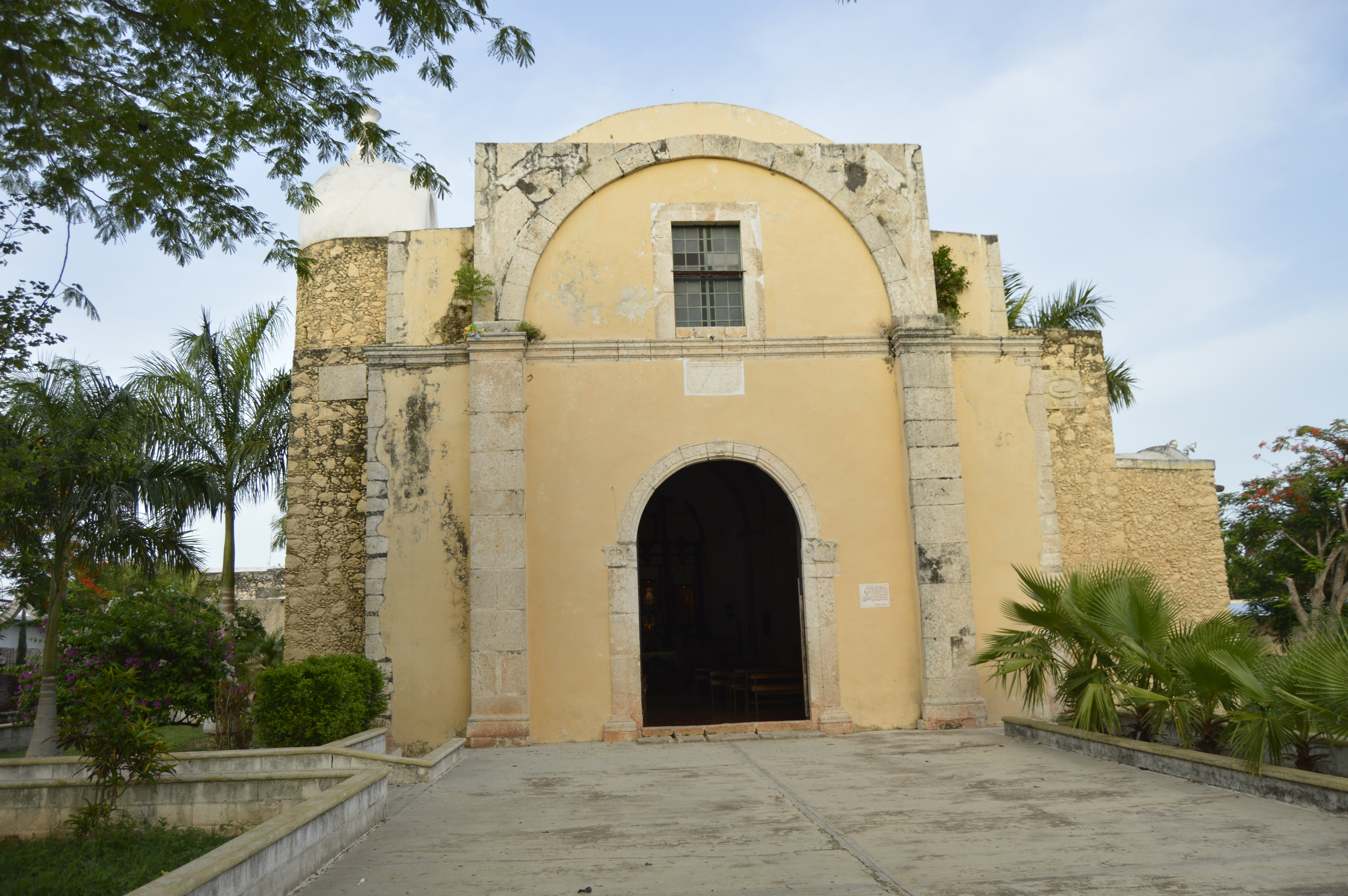
- Principal Church of Chocholá, Yucatán

- Coat of arms

- Location of Chochola in Yucatan

- Location of the municipality in Mexico
- Coordinates: 20°44′12″N 89°51′11″W
- Country: Mexico
- State: Yucatán

Government
  - Municipal President: Erwin Obet Martin Alcocer

Area
  - Total: 99.64 km^{2} (38.47 sq mi)

Population (2010)
  - Total: 4,530
  - Density: 45.5/km^{2} (118/sq mi)
- Time zone: UTC-6 (Central Standard Time)
- INEGI Code: 31011

Chocholá Municipality is a municipality in the Mexican state of Yucatán. It is located in the western part of the state, about 21 kilometers southwest of the city of Mérida. The name is said to mean "brackish water".

Chocholá, pronounced "choh choh LAH" is home to much advertised cenote as well as a luxury hotel, the Hacienda Chablé. At the time of this writing (Spring 2020) the town's center has been refurbished and painted in some color

- Area: 99. 64 km^{2}.
- Population: 4,339
  - Women: 2,135
  - Men: 2,205
- Average elevation: 14 meters

== Geography ==
The municipality is bordered on the south by Kopomá, and on the west by Samahil and Maxcanú. To the north and east lies Umán and Samahil also shares a part of the northern boundary.

=== Water and land ===
The terrain is flat and rocky. Primary use is for grazing, agriculture and forestry. Water sources are underground and include six cenotes. The climate is sub-humid with rain falling primarily between the months of May and July. The average rainfall is 1200 mm. The average annual temperature is 26.8 °C.

=== Communities ===
The primary population centre is the eponymous Chocholá. Among the other communities of the municipality are Pujil, Chablé, San Francisco, Juat, San Matías, Cheneld, and San Pablo.

== Points of interest ==
- The former Chocholá hacienda
- Temple of the Immaculate Conception
- Maya sites
- Cenote San Ignacio, small with restaurant, bathrooms and generally set up for tourism
- Chocholá is home to the Hacienda Chablé, a luxury hotel

== Events and festivities ==
- Mexican Independence Day: Sept. 16
- Day of the Mexican Revolution: Nov. 20
- Easter: Thursday and Friday before
- Holy Cross Day, May 3
- Virgin of Guadalupe celebration: Dec. 12
- Day of the Dead: Nov. 2
- Celebration in honor of Christ's Love: Sept. 24-30

== Government ==
Elections are held every three years, when the mayor and his cabinet are chosen. There are fifteen localities in the municipality; the most important are: Chocholá (cabecera municipal), San Antonio Chablé, El Roble, Tch'een-Men, El Limonar, Doroteo Arango, Misko, San Luis Dos, Santa María, Xamán Ek and San Luis Cuatro.
