= Afar (magazine) =

Travel magazine

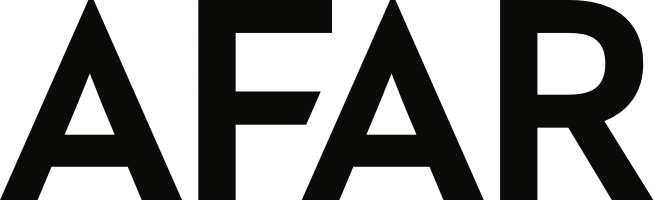
- Categories: Travel
- Frequency: 6 issues per year
- Founder: Greg Sullivan and Joseph Diaz
- Founded: 2009
- Company: Afar Media
- Country: U.S.
- Based in: San Francisco, California
- Language: English
- Website: www.afar.com
- ISSN: 1947-4377

Afar (styled AFAR) is a print and digital publication focused on experiential travel. Based in New York and San Francisco, it covers many travel and related topics such as food and drink, arts, culture, and the outdoors. Their articles are available on the company's website, and in the print magazine.

== Background ==
Afar was founded by Greg Sullivan and Joseph Diaz, after the pair took a six-week trip to India. They launched Afar as a print magazine in 2009 along with editor-in-chief Julia Cosgrove and have since grown into a travel media company whose portfolio now includes Afar magazine; afar.com; Learning Afar, a non-profit, travel scholarship program; Afar Experiences, an immersive travel event series; Travel Tales podcast; and Afar Advisor, a B-to-B platform for travel advisors. Defunct programs include Afar Ambassadors, a large group of unpaid contributors who could create online content.

== Travel Tales Podcast ==
Afar Media has a travel podcast called Travel Tales, hosted by deputy editor Aislyn Greene, which launched in July 2020.

== Learning Afar ==
Learning Afar provides scholarships for educational journeys for students in collaboration with No Barriers. Learning Afar is a travel scholarship program for students from low-income backgrounds and for those with mixed abilities. Since Learning Afar was founded, they have sent more than 1,300 young people on trips to places like Cambodia, Costa Rica, Mexico, and Peru.

== Awards ==
The magazine was featured on The Martha Stewart Show, and has received awards in the travel writing and journalism industry (Lowell Thomas Awards) for their photography and storytelling. Afar.com was a Webby honoree in 2020.

Several stories from Afar Magazine have also been included in the Best American Travel Writing series, including "Vietnam's Bowl of Secrets" by David Farley, "The Sound of Silence" by Lisa Abend, "Counter Revolution" by Anya von Bremzen, and "Out of Sight" by Ryan Knighton.
