= À la carte =

Ordering individual dishes from a menu

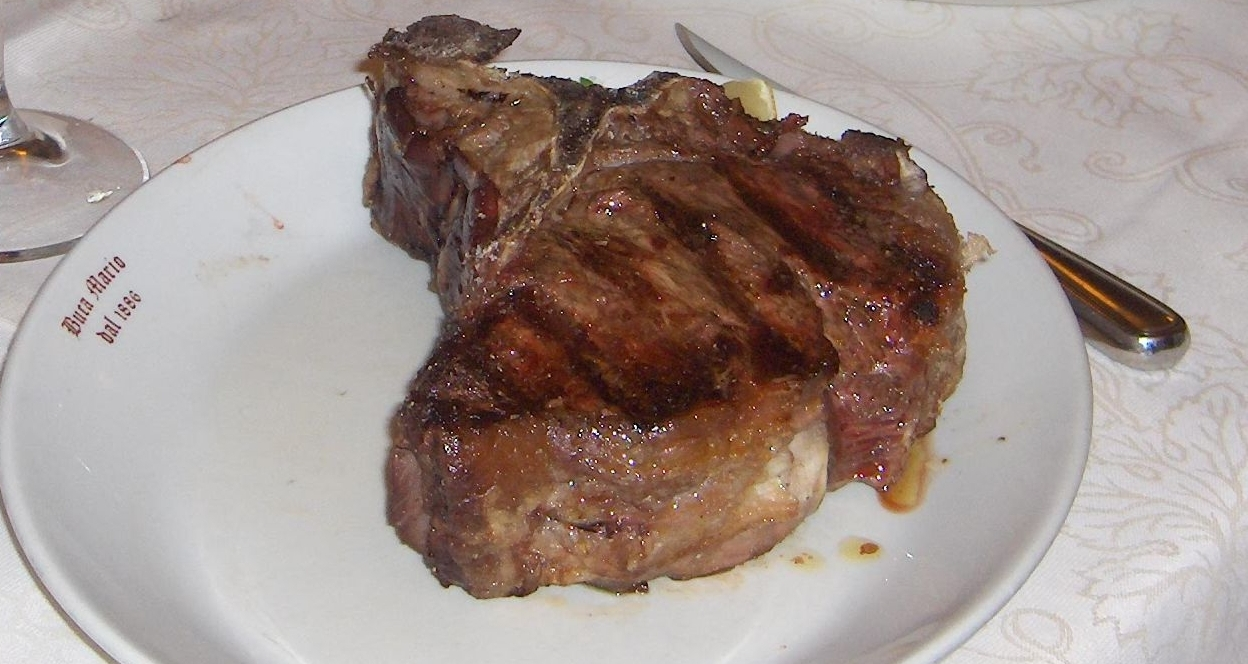
Steak à la carte, with no side dish or garnish; these must be requested separately.

In restaurants, à la carte (/ɑː.lə.ˈkɑːrt/, ah-lə-KART; French: [a la kaʁt], lit. 'at the card') is the practice of ordering individual dishes from a menu in a restaurant, as opposed to table d'hôte, where a set menu is offered. It is an early-19th-century loan from French meaning "according to the menu".

The individual dishes to be ordered may include side dishes, or the side dishes may be offered separately, in which case, they are also considered à la carte.

== History ==
The earliest examples of à la carte are from 1816 for the adjectival use ("à la carte meal", for example) and from 1821 for the adverbial use ("meals were served à la carte"). These pre-date the use of the word menu, which came into English in the 1830s.

== See also ==
- Omakase, Japanese expression for letting the chef decide
- Buffet
- Glossary of French words and expressions in English
- Pro rata, a method of billing or other calculation based on proportional usage

== Bibliography ==
- Baraban, R.S.; Durocher, J.F. (2010). Successful Restaurant Design. John Wiley & Sons. pp. 17–18. ISBN 978-0-470-25075-4.
- Committee on Nutrition Standards for Foods in Schools, Food and Nutrition Board, Institute of Medicine (2007). Nutrition Standards for Foods in Schools. National Academies Press. page 83.
- Mosimann, Anton (1983). Cuisine à la carte. Macmillan Publishers Limited. 304 pages.
