= Caesar Cardini =

Italian-American restaurateur, chef, and hotel owner (1896–1956)

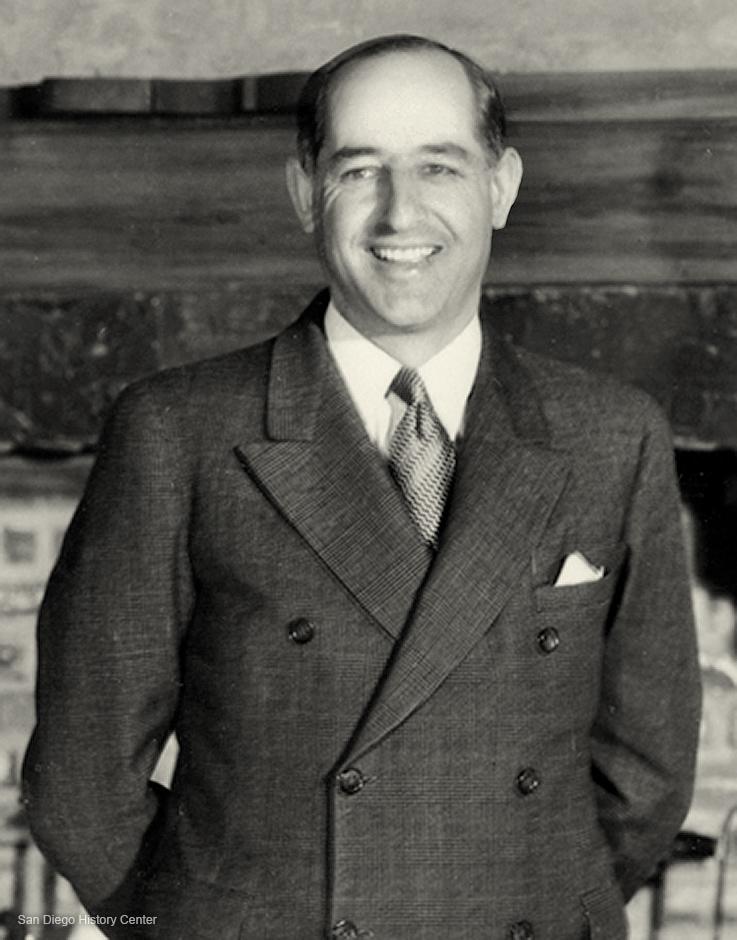
- Born: February 24, 1896; Baveno, Italy
- Died: November 3, 1956 (aged 60); Los Angeles, California, U.S.
- Occupations: Restauranteur, chef, hotel owner
- Known for: Inventing the Caesar salad

Cesare Cardini (also known as Caesar or César, February 24, 1896 – November 3, 1956) was an Italian restaurateur, chef, and hotel owner who is credited with creating Caesar salad at his Tijuana restaurant Caesar's.

== Biography ==
Cesare Cardini was born in Baveno, a comune on the shore of Lake Maggiore in Northwest Italy, and had seven siblings: Bonifacio, Annibale, Nereo, Alessandro, Carlotta, Gaudenzio and Maria. While Bonifacio, Annibale, Carlotta, and Maria stayed in Italy, the other four emigrated to America. Nereo opened a small hotel near the casino in Santa Cruz, California, while Alessandro and Gaudenzio eventually entered the restaurant business in Mexico City. Cardini sailed as a steerage passenger on board the RMS Olympic, which arrived at the Port of New York on May 1, 1913. After inspection at Ellis Island, he boarded a train bound for Montreal. He eventually returned to Italy, but came back to the United States in 1919.

Cardini ran Brown's Restaurant in Sacramento with his partner William Brown, then moved to San Diego. At that time, he established the first of several restaurants in Tijuana, where he could avoid the restrictions of Prohibition. He married musician Camille D. Stump on August 27, 1924, in Santa Ana, California. The couple had one daughter, Rosa Maria Cardini (1928–2003).

At some point, Cardini started Caesar's restaurant and eventually hotel in Tijuana, Mexico with his brother Alessandro. Cardini is credited with having created Caesar salad in 1924. Guests regularly crossed the California border to Tijuana for alcohol, not legally available in the U.S. during Prohibition, and came to dine at Caesar's. According to a 1987 interview with his daughter Rosa, they came in such numbers on July 4, 1924 that Cardini "simply wasn't prepared for that many people" and improvised by making the first Caesar salad "to give the dinner guests a show as well as a meal", putting together the ingredients in the middle of the dining room. It soon became fashionable among Hollywood celebrities, especially after he moved his restaurant a few blocks to the hotel, which was built around 1929 (nowadays called Hotel Caesar's).

After the repeal of the 1919 Volstead Act and the Mexican government's enactment of a ban on gambling, business from tourism to Tijuana drastically fell off. Cardini quit his Mexican businesses in 1936 and moved back to San Diego to establish the Caesar Cardini Cafe. For several years, he also operated Tavern Hacienda in San Diego, the Beacon Inn in Cardiff-by-the-Sea, and the Caesar Cardini Villa in Chula Vista.

Cardini moved to Los Angeles with his family about 1938, and focused on the production and marketing of his Caesar salad dressing, which he trademarked in 1948. He died on November 3, 1956 in Los Angeles, following a stroke at his home, after which Rosa took control of Caesar Cardini Foods Inc. Later, the Cardini's brand was sold, and is now owned by the T. Marzetti Company. It is still popular and offers more than a dozen varieties of the original recipe.

== Legacy ==
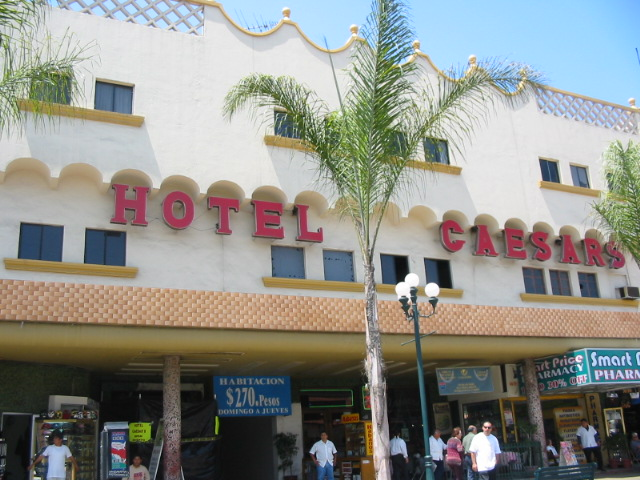
Nowadays Hotel Caesar's on Avenida Revolución (formerly Main Street), c.2000

In Tijuana, Caesar's Restaurant and Bar on Avenida Revolución, now under Baja Med celebrity chef Javier Plascencia, serves the "original Caesar's salad".
