= Animalón =

Mexican restaurant in Valle de Guadalupe, Mexico

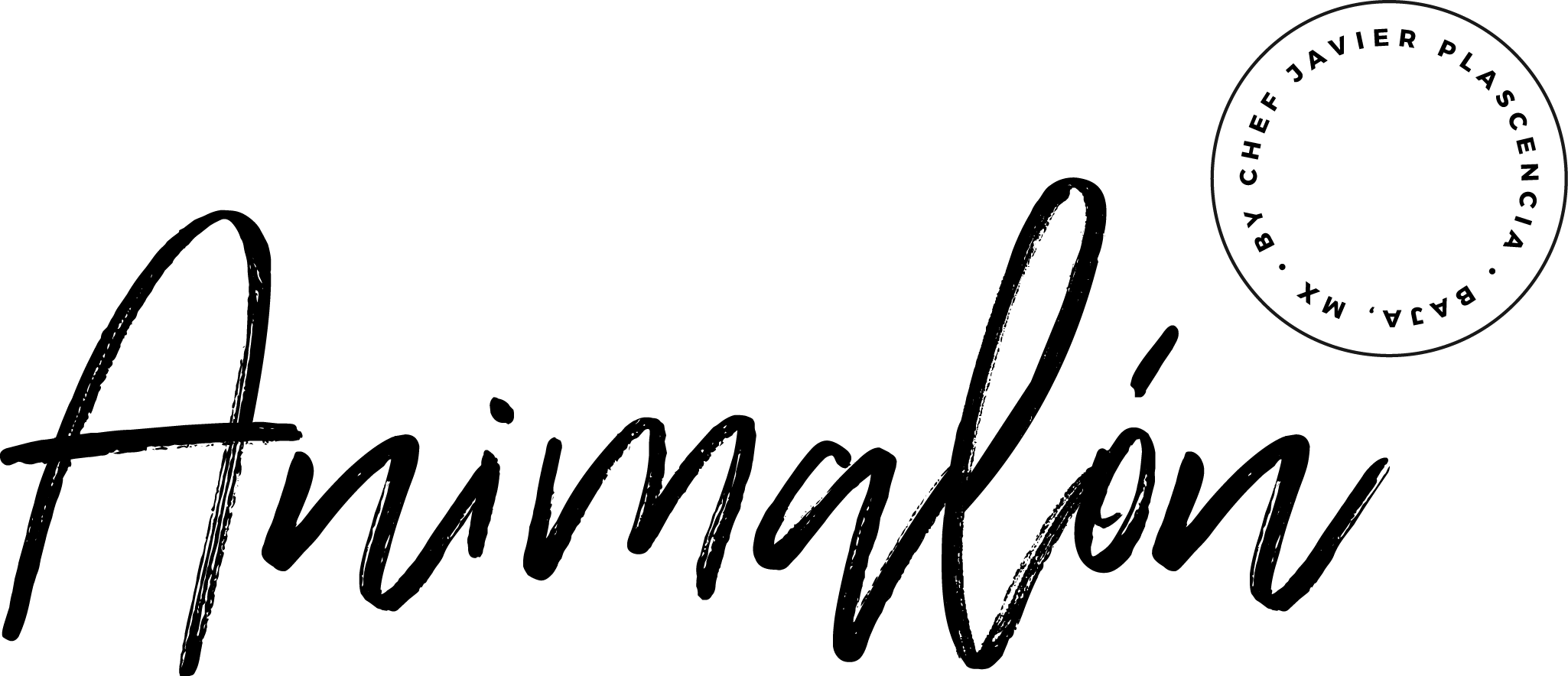
- Interactive map of Animalón

Restaurant information
- Established: August 2017; 9 years ago
- Owner: Javier Plascencia
- Head chef: Oscar Torres
- Food type: Mexican
- Rating: (Michelin Guide, 2024)
- Location: Carretera Tecate-Ensenada Km. 83, Ejido Francisco Zarco, Valle de Guadalupe, Baja California, 22750, Mexico
- Coordinates: 32°04′00″N 116°36′05″W
- Website: animalonbaja.com

Animalón is a Mexican fine dining restaurant in the Valle de Guadalupe region of Ensenada Municipality, in Baja California, Mexico, serving contemporary Mexican cuisine. It is owned by the chef Javier Plascencia, who opened it in 2017, and its head chef is Oscar Torres. The establishment offers diners the opportunity to eat under a 200-year-old oak tree. Animalón operates as a pop-up restaurant, opening between April and November.

Animalón offers a seasonal farm-to-table tasting menu, comprising a six-to nine-course menu centered on seafood and vegetables. Critics have given Animalón favorable reviews, and in 2024, the restaurant received one Michelin star in the first Michelin Guide covering restaurants in Mexico.

== Description ==
Animalón serves Mexican food. It offers monthly six-to nine-course tasting menus centered mainly on seafood and vegetables. The ingredients are sourced locally (from Baja California and Baja California Sur, Mexico, and California, United States) under a farm-to-table concept. The food served draws inspiration from Mexican, French and Asian cooking techniques.

Dishes served have included beer-braised barbacoa, cooked inside a pig's bladder, seared sea bass with a sea urchin cream sauce, and mussels presented in charred potatoes, imitating shells. The eatery also offers wine pairing featuring drinks produced in the state. Other drinking options include craft beers and cocktails.

The establishment is a pop-up restaurant, opening between April and November. Animalón serves customers under a 200-year-old oak tree, serving around a dozen of tables. According to the Michelin Guide, diners are seated in a different restaurant during cold months, when Animalón is closed.

== History ==
Animalón is the second restaurant opened by the chef Javier Plascencia at the Finca Altonzano in the Valle de Guadalupe region. Animalón opened as a restaurant in August 2017, previously serving as a venue for social events. After opening his first restaurant, he conceived the idea of opening another restaurant beneath the tree.

Oscar Torres is Animalón's head chef. He was born in Los Angeles, California, and has Mexican heritage; his parents opened a seafood restaurant there. He studied culinary arts in Philadelphia, Pennsylvania, and trained in Michelin-starred French restaurants in Los Angeles.

In February 2021, Plascencia inaugurated Animalón by the Sea, a floating restaurant in the Gulf of California, in response to the impact of the COVID-19 pandemic on the food industry. The route begins at Cabo San Lucas passes by the Arch of Cabo San Lucas. Its menu is similar to that of the Valle de Guadalupe restaurant, changing every two weeks based on seasonal ingredients. The vessel has two decks and measures 15 meters (49 ft) in length with a beam of 7.4 meters (24 ft), and has capacity for 40 people.

== Reception ==
Bill Esparza named Animalón one of the best restaurants in Valle de Guadalupe for the websites Alta Online and Eater. Chef Sheyla Alvarado recommended the restaurant saying it was one of her favorites for Food & Wine magazine.

When the Michelin Guide debuted in 2024 in Mexico, it awarded 18 restaurants with Michelin stars. Animalón received one star, meaning "high-quality cooking, worth a stop", earning praise for its atmosphere.

== See also ==
- List of Mexican restaurants
- List of Michelin-starred restaurants in Mexico
