= Caesar's =

Restaurant in Tijuana, Mexico

Coordinates: 32.53°N 117.04°W

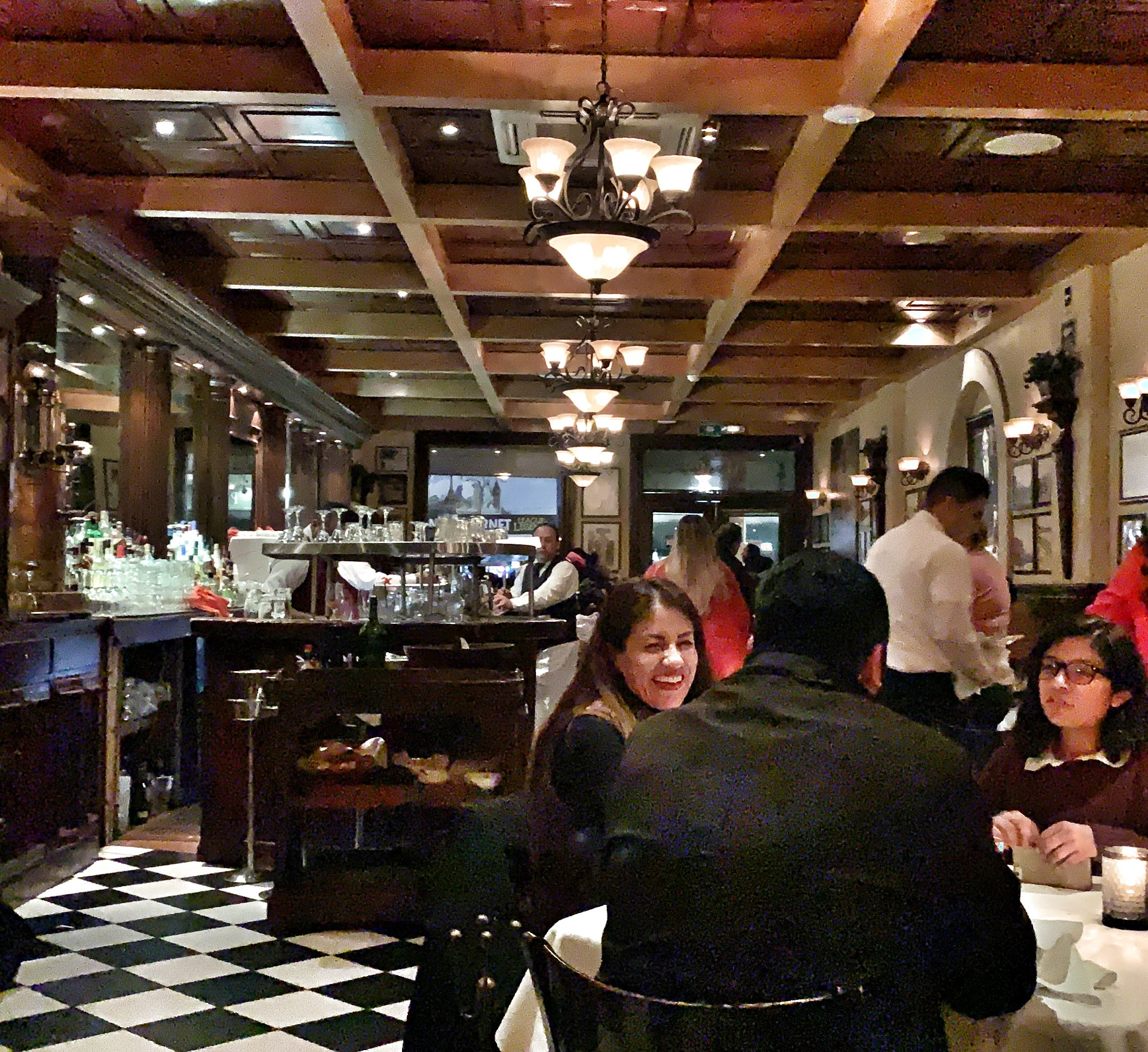
Restaurant interior, 2019

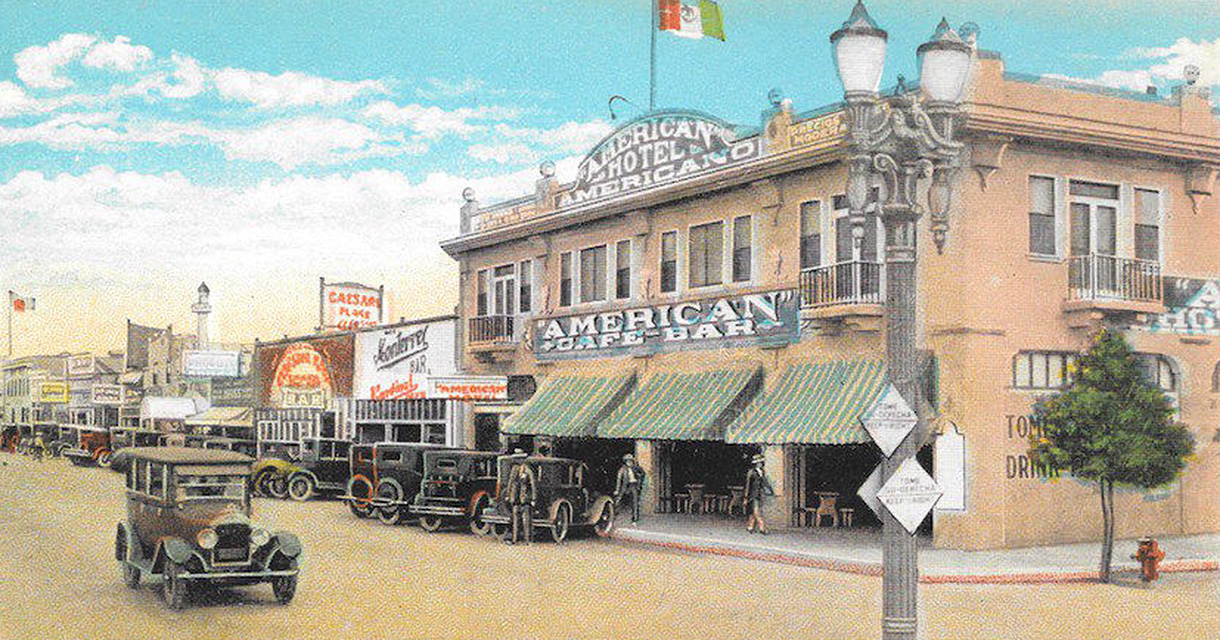
1920s postcard showing "Caesar's Place" (third from right) at their original location on 2nd Street

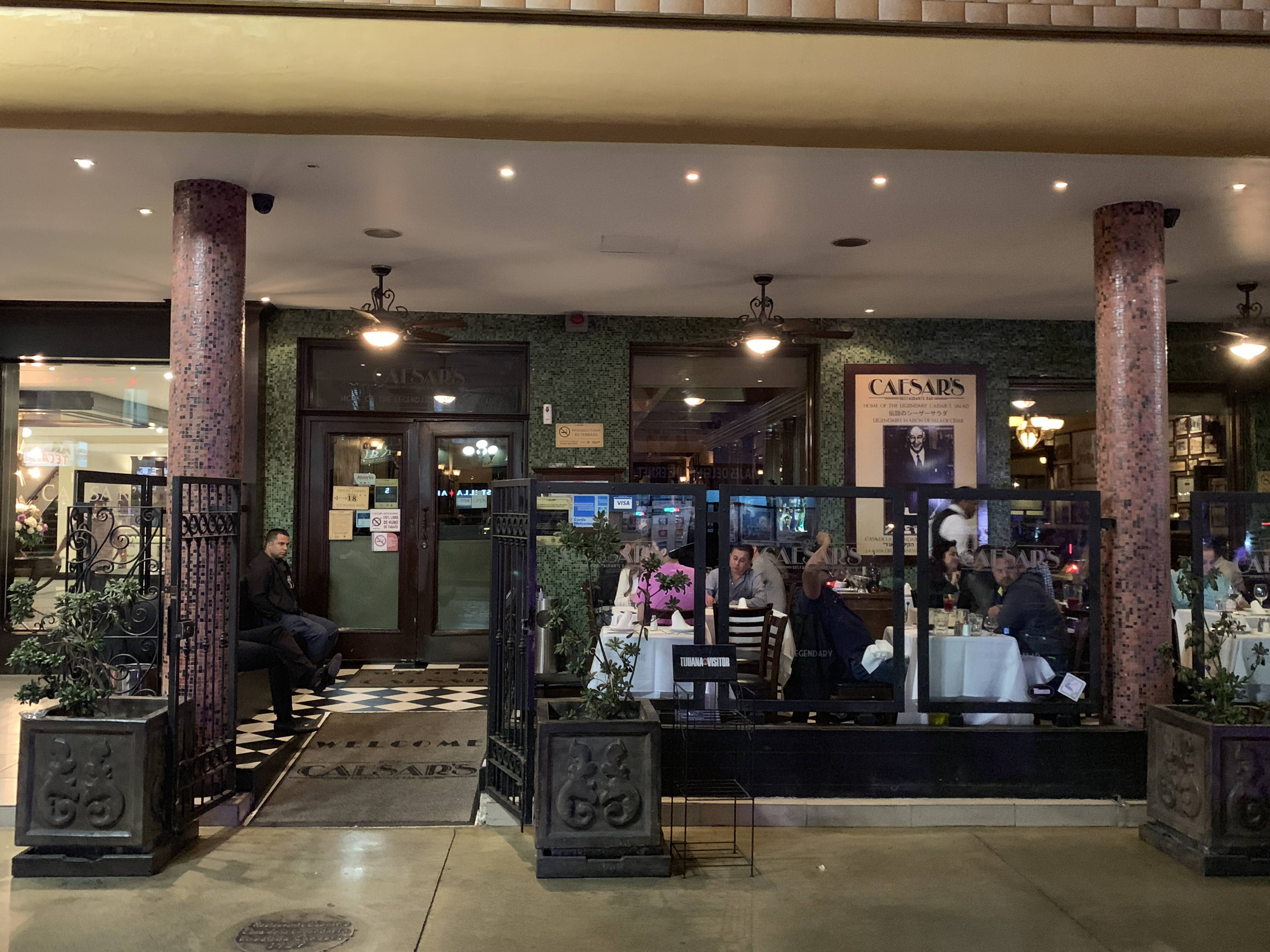
Restaurant exterior, 2018

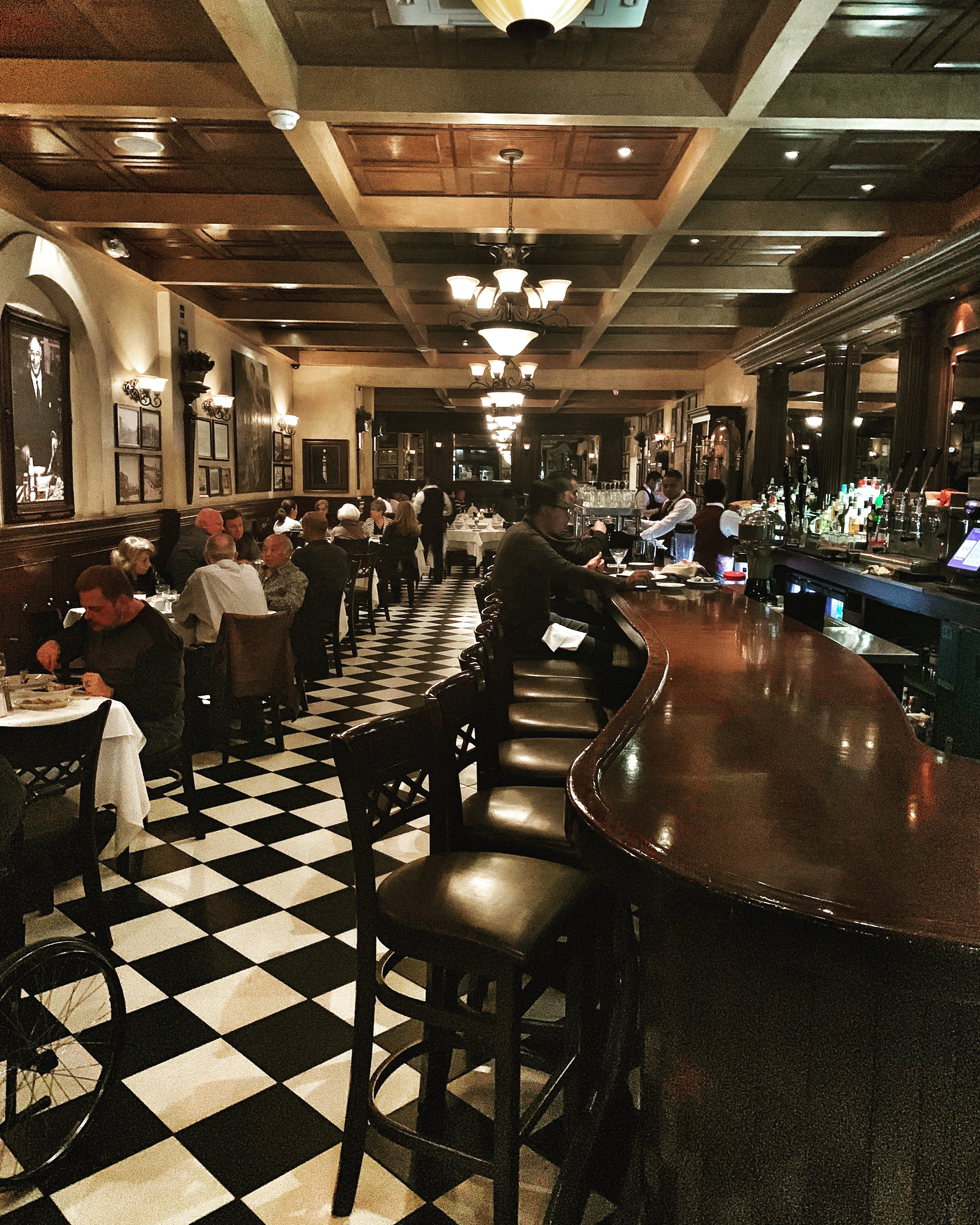
The bar, 2018

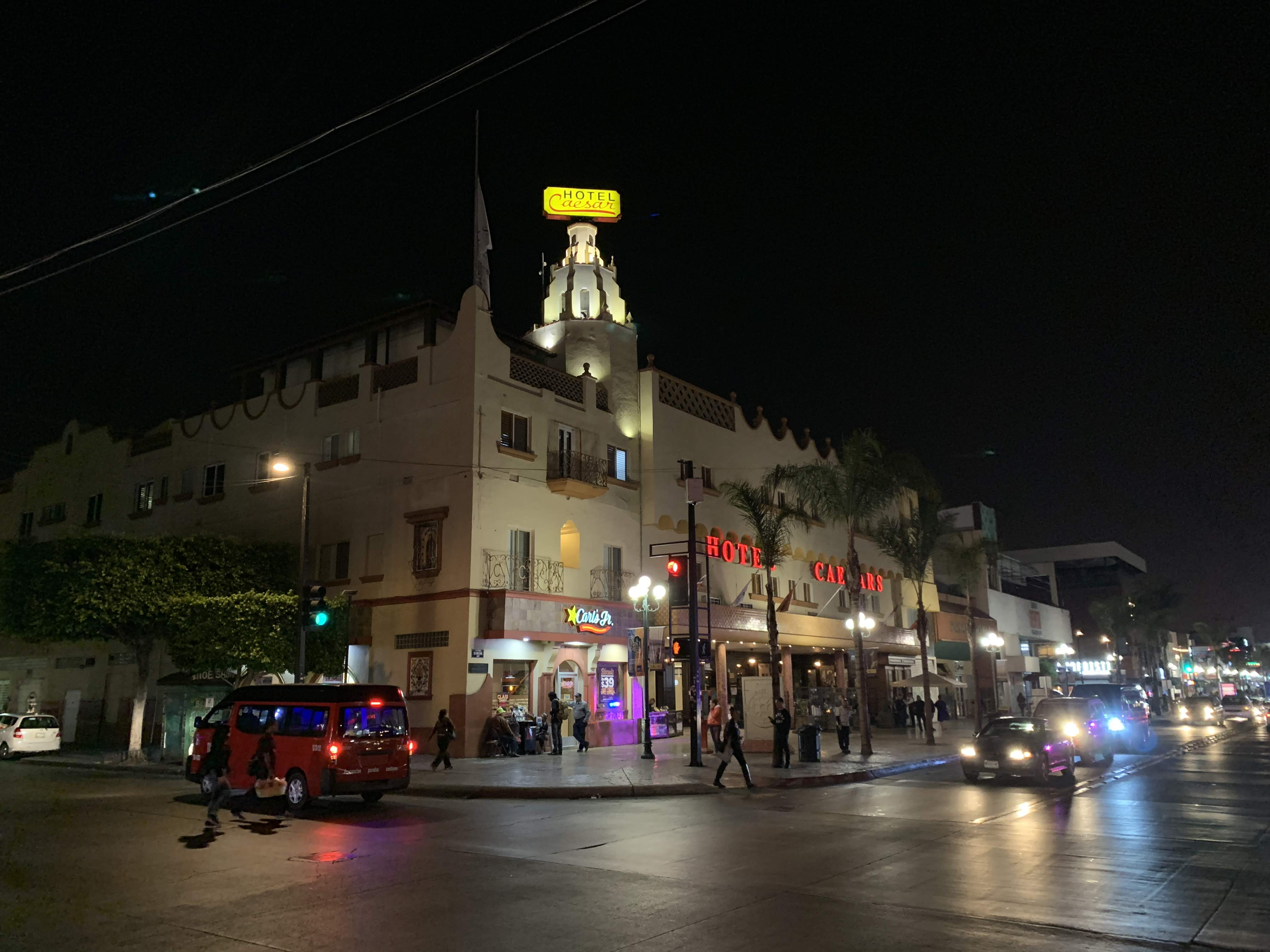
Caesar's Hotel building in 2018

Caesar's is a restaurant inside a hotel of the same name on Avenida Revolución in Tijuana, Mexico. The restaurant is best known for being the origin of Caesar salad.

== History ==
The restaurant was founded by Italian immigrants Cesare (also known as Caesar or César) and Alessandro Cardini in Tijuana due to the fact that, due to its Mexico–United States border-straddling status, Tijuana experienced a boom in visitors from Southern California in the 1920s due to alcohol prohibition in the United States. In the early years, it was called "Caesar's Place" or "Caesar's Franco-Italian Restaurant".

According to a 1987 interview with Cesare's daughter Rosa, American guests came in such numbers on July 4, 1924 that he "simply wasn't prepared for that many people" and improvised by making the first Caesar salad "to give the dinner guests a show as well as a meal", putting together the ingredients he had on hand in the middle of the dining room. The salad has since become one of the most ubiquitous dishes on restaurant menus worldwide. Over the years, many other names have been mentioned as possible inventors of the salad, including Cesare's brother Alessandro and Livio Santini, a young chef at the restaurant who some believe brought the salad recipe from his mother in Italy. However, Tijuana historian Fernando Escobedo de la Torre has stated that the original salad was in fact created by Cesare on July 4, 1924.

The salad became famous and was promoted by celebrities and other personalities, spreading its popularity to the United States and Europe. By around 1930, the salad was offered as "Romaine Parmigian Dressing" for 50 cents, according to an original menu on display at Caesar's restaurant.

In 1931, the Cardinis moved to a larger building with hotel rooms, as many visitors from California wished to spend the night in Tijuana. After they sold the hotel and restaurant in 1936, it went through several ownership changes. In 1948, the Avakian family took over the property and continued to operate the restaurant, including its unusual tradition of preparing Caesar salad table-side.

American chef, author, and television personality Julia Child recounted in her 1975 book "From Julia Child’s Kitchen" her early memories of dining at Caesar's in Tijuana and experiencing the Caesar salad prepared tableside by Cesare himself.

The restaurant experienced a significant reduction in U.S. visitors to Tijuana after the September 11 attacks, leading to its closure in 2009 due to debt. Mexican chef Javier Plascencia's family took over the restaurant's operations, renovated it, and reopened it in July 2010. The property where the restaurant operates continues under the Avakian family's ownership.

In 2017, the San Diego Reader called Caesar's the "classiest joint in Tijuana", where waiters still prepare "original" Caesar salads tableside.

The restaurant and hotel were featured by American chef Andrew Zimmern in his Travel Channel television special The Border Check.
