= Baja Med =

Term for type of fusion cuisine

Baja Med is a term conceived by Chef Miguel Ángel Guerrero that refers to fusion cuisine of Mexican cuisine, such as chicharrón and cotija cheese, with those of Mediterranean, such as olive oil, and Asian cuisine, such as lemongrass. Baja Med dishes showcase the fresh produce and seafood of Baja California.

== Ingredients ==
The cuisine features the fresh produce of the state. This includes fresh seafood from the port of Ensenada such as mussels, oysters, clams and shrimp, and blue tuna; miniature vegetables from the fields south of Ensenada, olives from the winemaking region of the Guadalupe Valley just northeast of Ensenada, dates from San Ignacio and tomatoes and strawberries from the San Quintin Valley. Additional ingredients include red lobster, manta rays, sea cucumbers and salicornia, a succulent that grows in sand dunes.

== Examples of dishes ==
Examples of Baja Med dishes include:

- Tempura fish tacos
- Deep sea shrimp served with fried marlin, baby farm tomatoes, scallions and a sauce made with local cheeses
- Beet carpaccio with blue cheese and mint vinaigrette.
- Duck skewered with licorice and sprinkled with guava dust
- Risotto topped with salt-cured nopalitos (prickly pear cactus) and charred octopus
- Slow-cooked short ribs bathed in a mission fig syrup on top of a black mole sauce

== Chefs and restaurants ==
Baja Med cuisine is a feature of the various restaurants of La Querencia and La Esperanza from Miguel Ángel Guerrero, other Tijuana restaurants such as Food Garden, and Manzanilla in the city of Ensenada. In Bonita, California, between San Diego and Tijuana, Plascencia's Romesco features the cuisine.

=== Valle de Guadalupe ===
In the Valle de Guadalupe wine country near Ensenada, chef Jaír Tellez's restaurant Laja is renowned for the cuisine, as are his restaurants Contramar and Merotoro in Mexico City. Diego Hernández heads up Corazón de Tierra in the Valle de Guadalupe, rated by William Reed Business Media (the "San Pellegrino survey") as one of Latin America's 50 best restaurants, also Rick Bayless and his trendy Leña Brava in Chicago. while chef Javier Plascencia is present with his Finca de Altozano, and Drew Deckman with Deckman's en el Mogor.
