= Avenida Revolución =

Street in Tijuana

Coordinates: 32.5305°N 117.0364°W

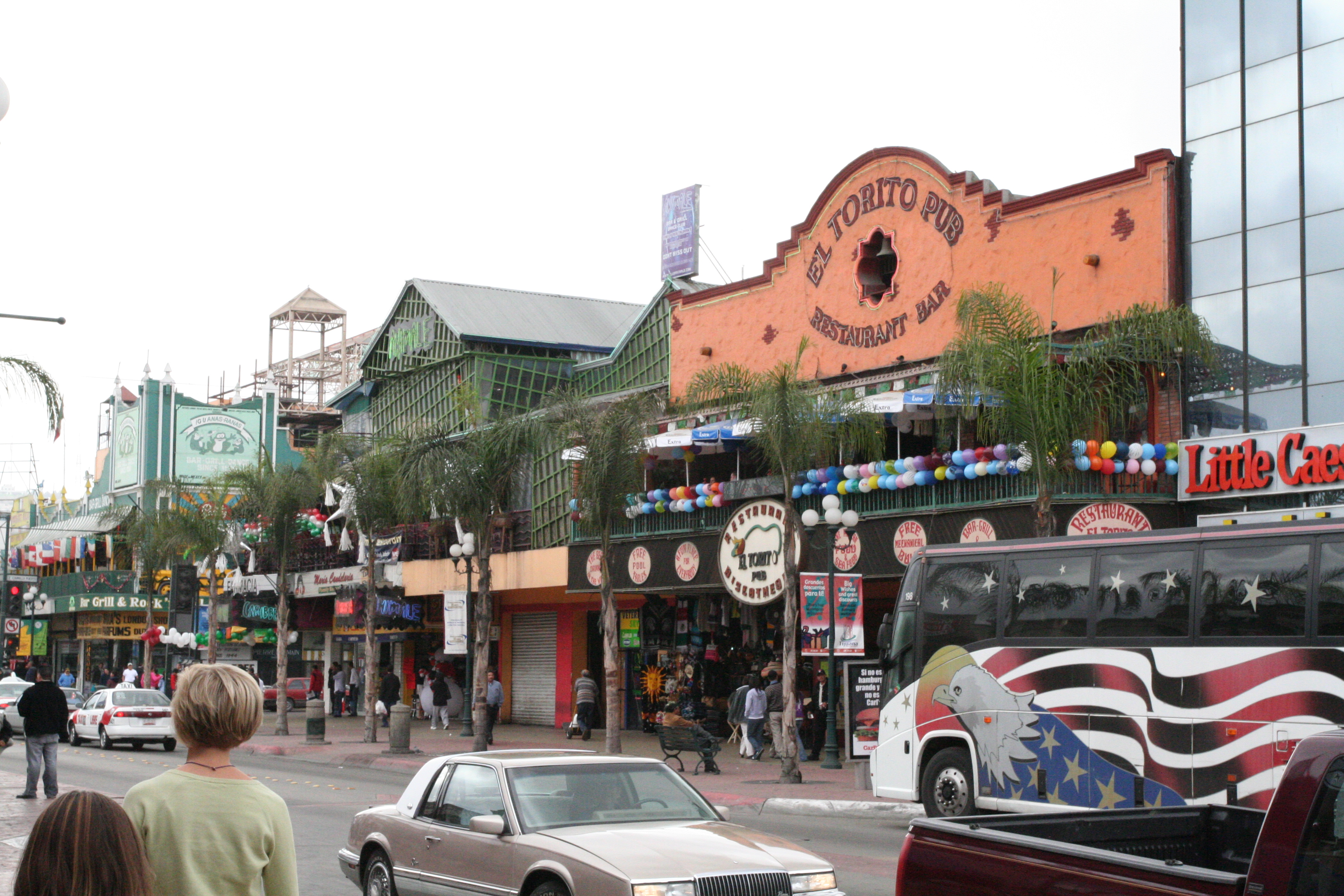
Avenida Revolución in Tijuana

Avenida Revolución (Spanish for "Revolution Avenue") is the tourist center in Tijuana, Baja California, México. It is a main thoroughfare of the historic downtown Tijuana, officially called Zona Centro, which forms part of the Delegación Centro or Central Borough of Tijuana.

== History ==
Avenida Revolución was the first road in Tijuana to be paved, near the beginning of the twentieth century. Originally called Avenida Olvera, it was from its earliest days a popular destination for American tourists who crossed the border from California. The avenue's most remarkable development was during the Prohibition era of 1920–33, when it was visited by American tourists seeking legal alcohol. The Caesar salad was invented on Avenida Revolución during this period by Caesar Cardini, the Italian-American proprietor of the Hotel Caesar and its restaurant Caesar's.

During this period the name of the avenue changed several times in line with political developments in Mexico. In 1920 it became Avenida A. In the late 1920s it became Avenida Álvaro Obregón and subsequently Avenida Libertad. In 1932 it received its current name.

Avenida Revolución has experienced many changes, and is known as the business card of Tijuana, "The most visited city in the world". It was known for its famous cantinas, including "La Ballena", the largest bar in the world when it was open. The city was popular with American Navy sailors until the United States Navy prohibited sailors from visiting Tijuana. From 1989 to 1994 the Avenida's Baby Rock discothèque was the claimed to be #1 club in the world based on gross revenues, before becoming in 2012 the Onixeus.

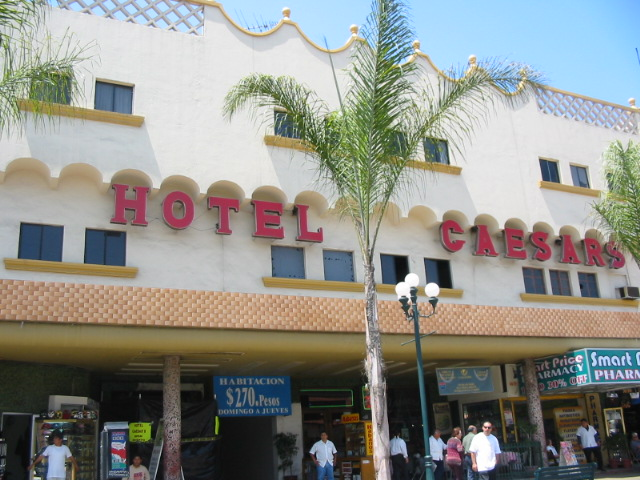
Hotel Caesar on Avenida Revolución, where Caesar salad was invented at the Caesar's Restaurant

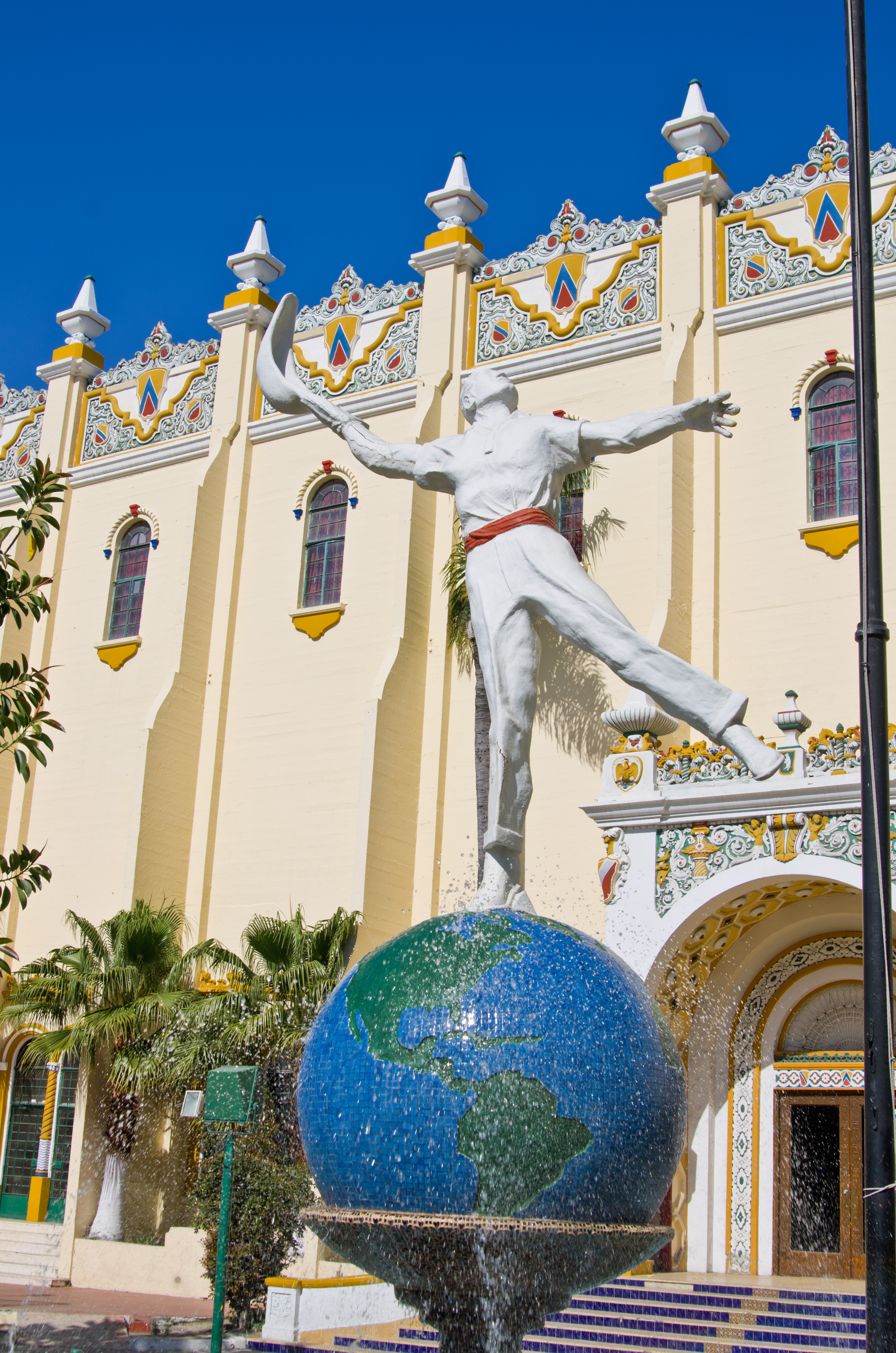
El Foro, the former jai alai palace

== Points of interest ==
Intersections north to south:

Cross street (C.=Calle, Av.=Avenida)	Cross street alt. name	Points of interest
Vía Internacional		Road from Mexico 1D from Ensenada/Rosarito
Av. Alberto Aldrete		
Av. Baja California		Migrant shelters
Av. Coahuila		
C. Primera	Primera (1ra, 1st)	Tijuana Arch (Arco de Tijuana), Puente México - pedestrian street to Plaza Viva Tijuana and Pedwest U.S. Border Crossing, Santiago Argüello pedestrian street, Plaza Santa Cecilia, Hotel Nelson
C. Benito Juárez	Segunda (2ª, 2nd)	HSBC Bank (historic building), Soriana supermarket
C. Felipe Carrillo Puerto	Tercera (3ª, 3rd)	SITT (BRT) bus stop, Pasaje Rodríguez art space housed in former souvenir/crafts passage (bazaar), Caliente casino
C. Salvador Díaz Mirón	Cuarta (4ª, 4th)	"Esquina Sara" cox-working and retail on site of former Sara department store, Hotel César, Caesar's restaurant
C Emiliano Zapata	Quinta (5ª, 5th)	
C. Flores Magón	Sexta (6ª, 6th)	Colectivo 9 design bazaar and food hall, Cine Tonalá art cinema, "hipster" shops
C. Hermenegildo Galeana	Séptima (7ª, 7th)	Jai Alai Palace and Caliente casino, SITT (BRT) bus stop "Jai Alai"
C. Miguel Hidalgo	Octava (8ª, 8th)	Sanborn's
C. Ignacio Zaragoza	Novena (9ª, 9th)	Waldo's variety store
C. Juan Sarabia	Décima (10ª, 10th)	
C. Plutarco Elías Calles	Undécima (11ª, 11th)	
C. Francisco Madero / Blvd. Fundadores		Torre de Agua Caliente monument; Street continues east-southeastward as Blvd. Agua Caliente.

== Attractions ==
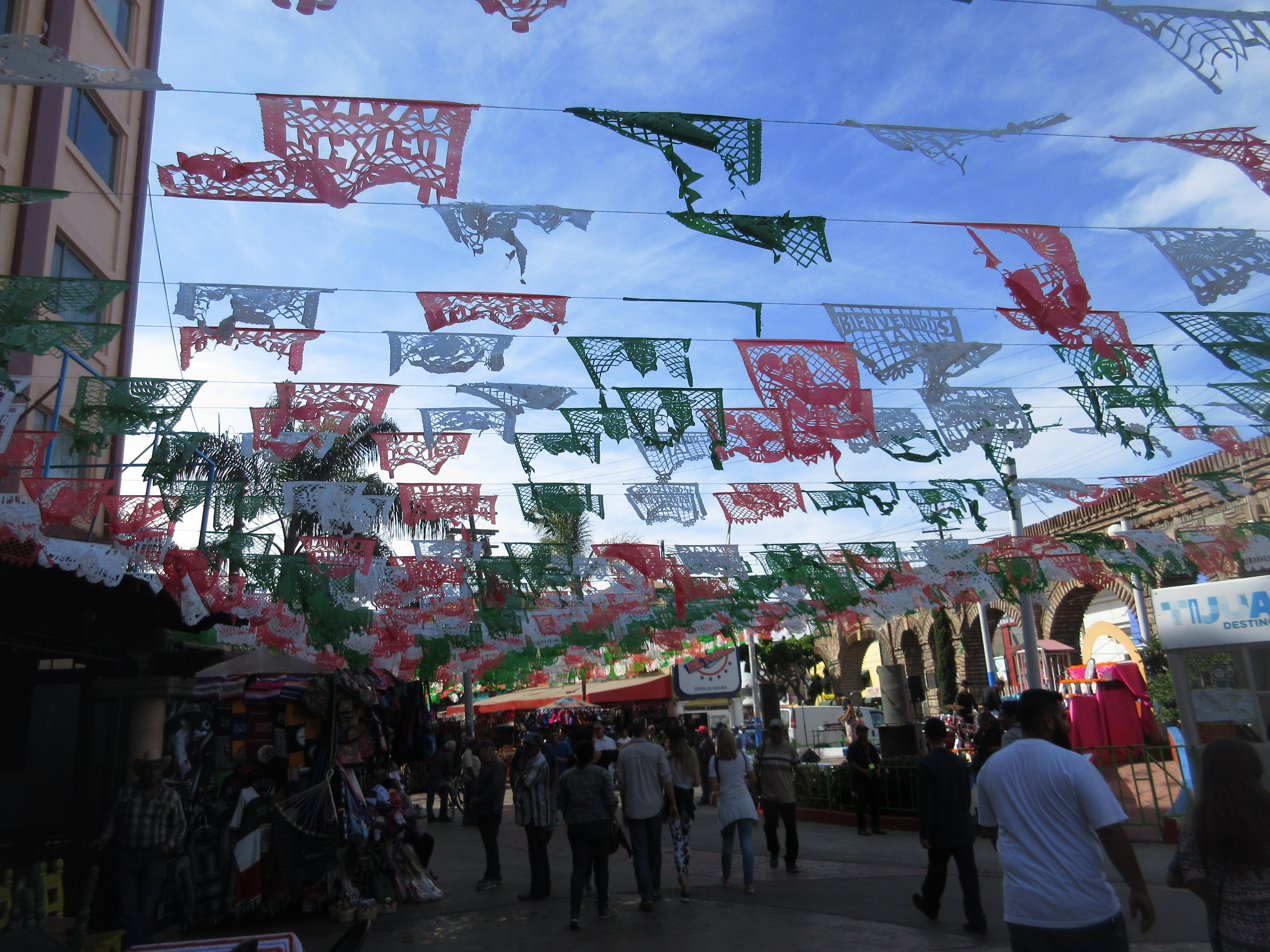
Plaza Santa Cecilia with papel picado decorations.

The long avenue is home to several distinct attractions, from cantinas and table dance bars to numerous dance clubs and art galleries.

A popular tourist attraction is taking a picture with a zonkey, a donkey painted to look like a zebra.

Businesses include some remaining handicraft and leather shops, pharmacies catering primarily to Americans, and a branch of the Sanborn's gift emporium and casual restaurant. American stores and fast-food restaurants like 7-Eleven and Burger King have a presence on the avenue, as they do throughout Tijuana.

The shopping arcades lost many of their customers and tenants in the years after 2001 as tourism dropped; however the Pasaje Rodríguez has been repurposed as a design/cultural destination with businesses selling coffee, books, and artisan clothing and other products.

El Foro, the former Jai Alai Palace, is now a concert venue.

Caliente operates two casinos on the avenue.

The avenue was remodeled in the mid-2010s, widening the sidewalks, adding bus rapid transit lanes and reducing lanes for car traffic.

== See also ==
- Tourism in Mexico
- LGBTQ culture in Tijuana
