= Javier Plascencia =

Mexican chef

Javier Plascencia is a chef from Tijuana, Baja California, Mexico.

== Plascencia and Baja Med cuisine ==
In 2011, Plascencia told the New York Times that the mission of his signature restaurant Misión 19 was to "revitalize the food scene in Tijuana", and to "revitalize the city itself". In the interview, he called his cuisine "Baja Mediterranean", combining ingredients from the region. Examples of this style include duck skewered with licorice and sprinkled with guava dust; risotto topped with salt-cured nopalitos (prickly pear cactus) and charred octopus; and slow-cooked short ribs bathed in a mission fig syrup on top of a black mole sauce.

== Early life ==
Born to – according to Plascencia – "hard-working and entrepreneurial" parents (Juan José Plascencia, aka: Don Tana), Javier started his culinary experience as a child alongside his brothers Juan Jose (aka; Tana), Margu and Julián in the kitchens of the family's restaurants, first at Giuseppis, later at Caesar's (birthplace of the Caesar salad) and then at Saverios. In his teens, he began his career as a chef studying in culinary arts schools in San Diego, California (immediately across the U.S.–Mexico border from Tijuana) and upon graduation, he worked in hotels and restaurants in the area. Plascencia told the Times that he would "later travel the world in search of flavors, ingredients and different types of cuisine, before returning to Tijuana to consolidate what would become my style."

== Restaurants ==
=== Tijuana ===
- Caesar's, birthplace of the Caesar salad, since its reopening in 2010
- Caffé Saverios, Italian cuisine, cafe and wine bar
- Casa Plascencia
- Cubo Bistro at CECUT Tijuana Cultural Center
- Misión 19 Cocina de Autor ("chef-driven cuisine"), and neighboring Bar 20, (located in the first LEED-certified building in northern Mexico)
- Erizo, specializing in Baja seafood and fish tacos.
- Khao San, Thai street food
- Villa Saverios

=== Elsewhere on the Baja California peninsula ===
- Animalón, Valle de Guadalupe
- Finca Altozano, Valle de Guadalupe. Outdoor "country grill" restaurant with grilled meat and international cuisine.
- Finca La Divina, Bed and Breakfast. Valle de Guadalupe
- Jazamango, Todos Santos, Baja California Sur, organic food, opened 2018

=== United States ===
- (Closed): Bracero Cocina de Raíz. Cuisine of "Mexican roots" in Little Italy, San Diego (opened 2015, closed 2017). Nominated in 2016 for a James Beard Award for best new restaurant.
- Pez (opened February 2019), Tijuana-style seafood and fish tacos in Downtown Miami
- Romesco, Bonita in Greater San Diego from its opening in 2009; Plascencia ended his association with Romesco in 2017

== Books ==
- The Soul of Baja, 2017
