= T. Marzetti Company =

American food group

- Type: Subsidiary of Lancaster Colony Corporation
- Traded as: Nasdaq: LANC
- Industry: Food processing
- Founded: 1896
- Headquarters: 380 Polaris Parkway, Westerville, OH 43082
- Key people: Jay Gerlach, Chairman; Dave Ciesinski, CEO
- Products: Marzetti; New York Brand; Sister Schubert's; Reames; Chatham Village; Cardini's; Girard's; Romanoff; Pfeiffer; Amish Kitchens; Inn Maid; Angelic Bakehouse; Flatout
- Revenue: US$1,676 million (2022)
- Operating income: US$356 million (2022)
- Number of employees: 2700
- Website: tmarzetticompany.com

The T. Marzetti Company is the Specialty Food Group of the Lancaster Colony Corporation. T. Marzetti produces numerous salad dressings, fruit and vegetable dips, frozen baked goods, and specialty brand items. It is one of the largest food and beverage companies based in Central Ohio. Headquartered in Westerville, Ohio, the T. Marzetti Company was founded by Teresa Marzetti.

== History ==
Teresa (née Piacentini) Marzetti was born in 1878 in Florence, Italy and came to the United States at the age of 18. After arriving in Columbus, Ohio by way of Genoa and then Ellis Island, New York, she married Joseph Marzetti, who was also an immigrant born in Italy. In 1896, Teresa and Joseph founded an Italian restaurant primarily serving students of the Ohio State University in Columbus. According to company lore, Teresa wrote down her goal in founding the company on a scrap of paper: "We will start a new place and serve good food. At a profit if we can, at a loss if we must, but we will serve good food." Joseph Marzetti died in 1911, but Teresa continued to run the business and in 1919, she opened a second location on Gay Street, followed by the closure of the original University District site a few years later. Marzetti remarried in April of 1924 to Carl Schaufele.

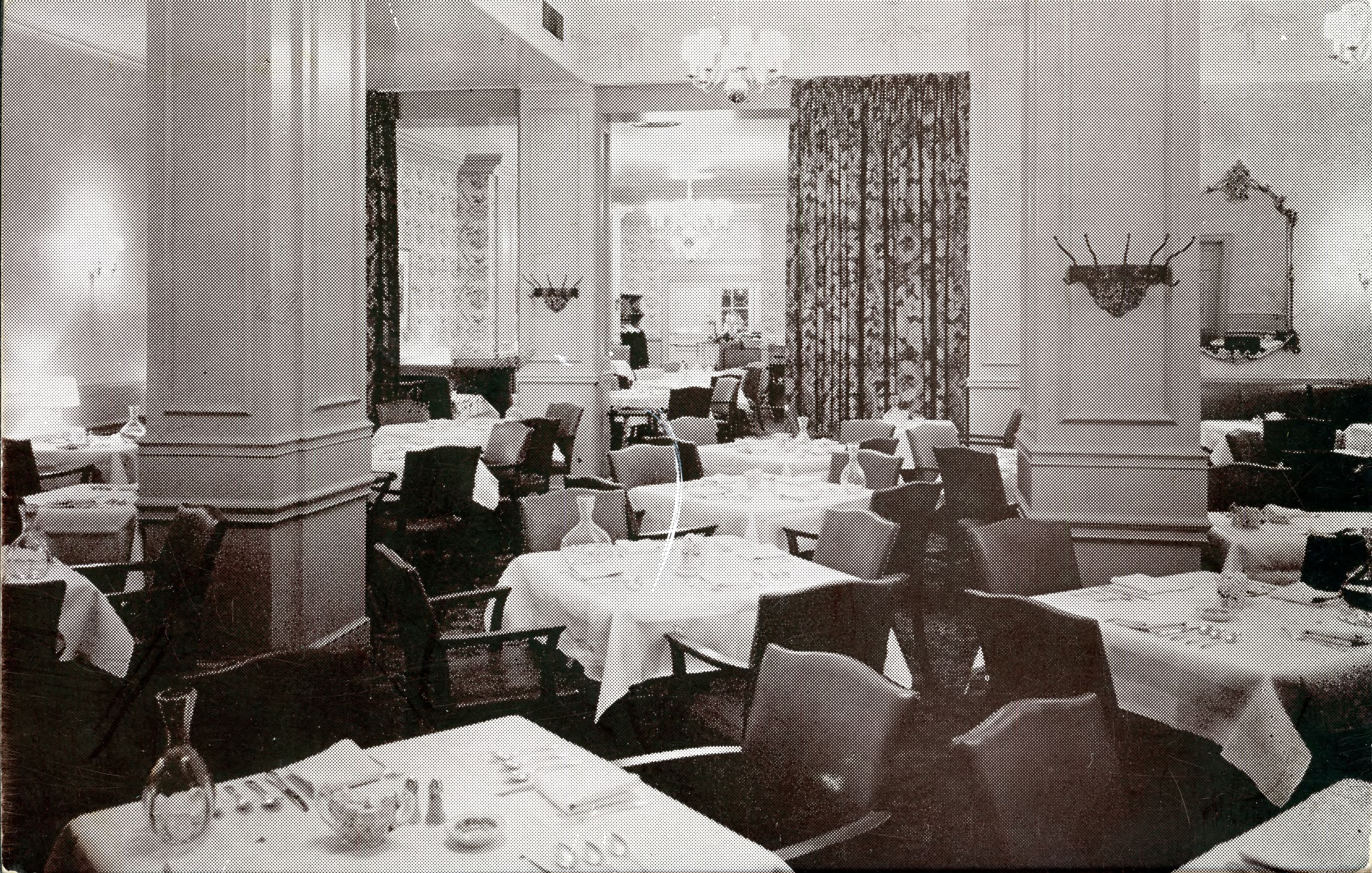
Interior of the Marzetti restaurant

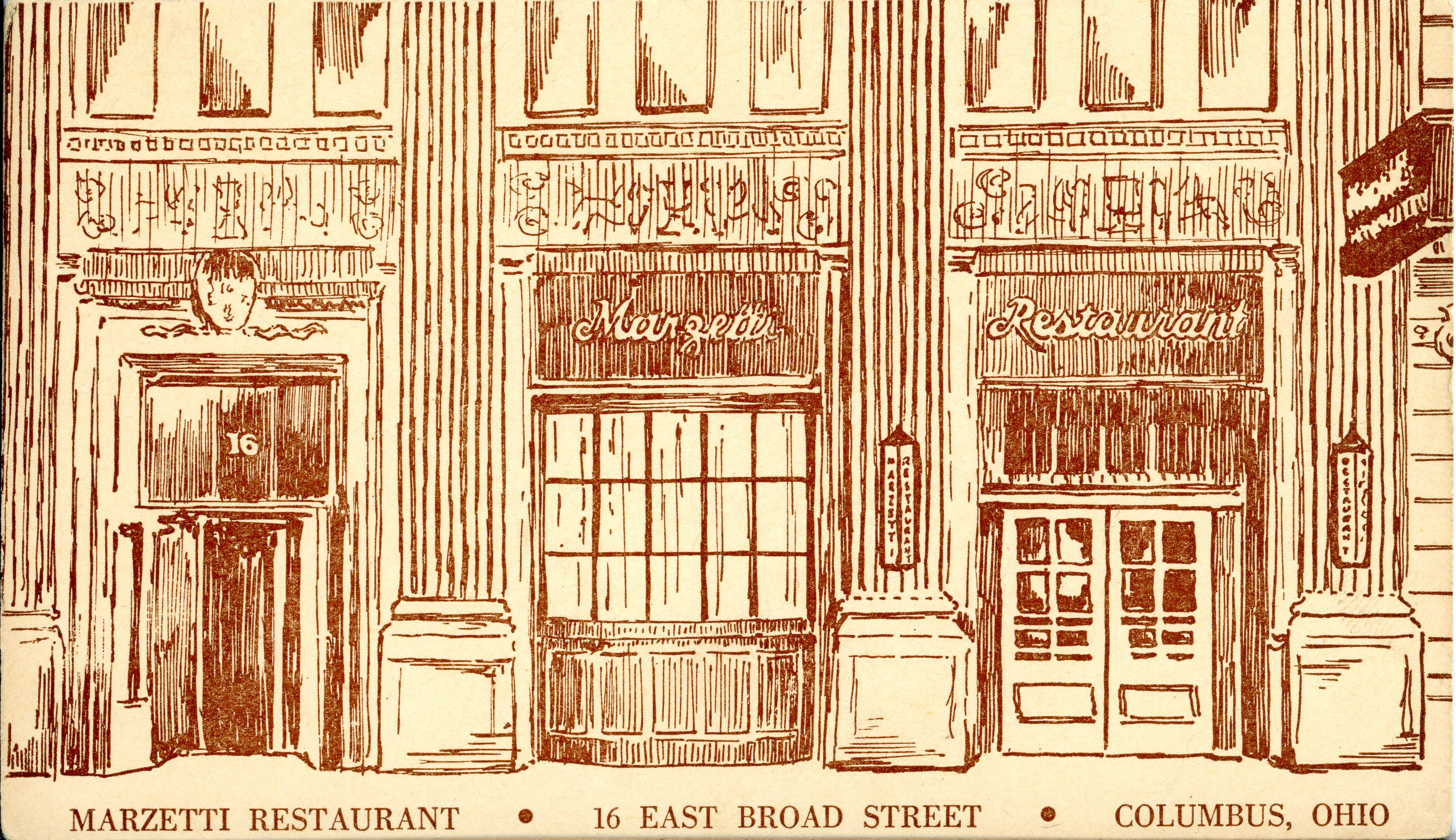
Drawing of the Marzetti location on East Broad Street in Columbus

A Marzetti staple was its homemade salad dressings, which began to be sold via mail shortly following the founding of the business, along with diet mayonnaise. Employee Katharine Hill is credited with the creation of Marzetti's dressing line. While it is sometimes said that Teresa invented the Midwestern casserole dish Johnny Marzetti and named it after her brother-in-law, the company said that there is no evidence for this story and it is not one the T. Marzetti corporation shares. Attribution of the dish to Teresa dates to at least 1973 in a statement by the president of T. Marzetti. In 1940, Marzetti's operations moved to 16 East Broad Street, across from the Ohio Statehouse, its most well-known location and one which was well-regarded in the city.

By 1955, Marzetti's upstairs kitchen of the restaurant became a full-scale factory, and the Marzetti brand of salad dressings found its way into grocery stores throughout Ohio due to initial success with takeout from the restaurant. By the late 1960's, the company built a dressing production plant in Columbus' Clintonville neighborhood on Indianola Avenue which served clients including Kmart, Big Bear Stores, and Kroger. After Teresa Marzetti's death in 1972, the restaurant closed, but the company and factory have continued on to this day.

Today, the company has expanded its operations at other plants including two additional plants in Columbus, as well as in Horse Cave, Kentucky. The plant in Milpitas, California was closed in 2025.

== Products ==
- Caviar
- Condiments
- Croutons and toppings
- Desserts and glazes
- Dips
- Dressings
- Egg noodles
- Frozen breads and rolls
- Light and reduced-calorie dressings
- Fresh bread

== Brands ==
- Marzetti (dressings and dips)
- New York Brand (frozen breads and croutons)
- Sister Schubert's (frozen breads)
- Amish Kitchens (egg noodles)
- Chatham Village (croutons)
- Cardini's (dressings)
- Girard's (dressings), now licensed to a subsidiary of Haco AG, Bern, Switzerland
- Inn Maid (egg noodles)
- Pfeiffer (dressings)
- Reames (egg noodles)
- Romanoff (caviar)
- Jack Daniel's mustard
- Angelic Bakehouse (bread, wraps, and crusts)
- Flatout (flatbreads and flatbread products)
- Chick-fil-A sauce
