= Alberto Víctor Aldrete =

Mexican politician

Alberto Víctor Aldrete was a Mexican politician. He was governor of the North Territory of Baja California (now the state of Baja California) from 1946 to 1947.

He was born in Ensenada, Baja California.

In 1916, Alberto Víctor Aldrete founded a customs service agency in Tijuana and together with R. J. Walters and Paul J. Lindley created the Compañía de Tranvías de Tijuana, S. A., (Tijuana Streetcar Company, Inc.) with a capital of 5,000 pesos. Aldrete also had an interest in the Agua Caliente Racetrack.

There is a street named after him (a cross street of Avenida Revolución) in Downtown Tijuana.
