= Caesar salad =

Green salad of romaine lettuce and croutons

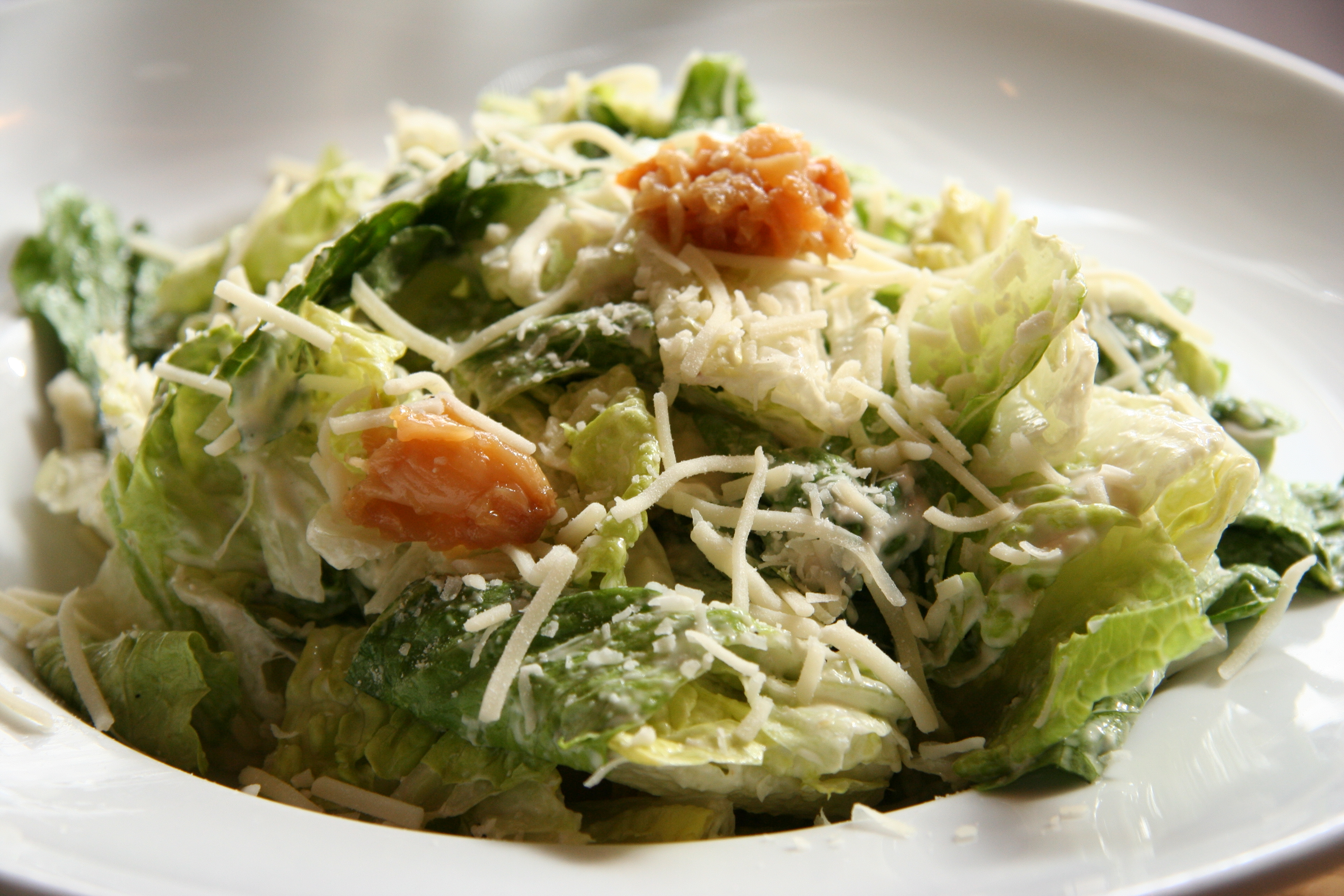
- Course: Hors d'oeuvre; Multicourse meal
- Place of origin: Mexico
- Region or state: Tijuana, Baja California
- Created by: Caesar Cardini
- Invented: 1924
- Serving temperature: Chilled or room temperature
- Main ingredients: Romaine lettuce, croutons, Parmesan cheese, lemon juice, olive oil, egg yolks, Worcestershire sauce, anchovies, (optionally) Dijon mustard, black pepper
- Variations: Multiple

A Caesar salad (also spelled Cesar, César and Cesare), also known as Caesar's salad, is a green salad of romaine lettuce and croutons commonly dressed with lemon juice (or lime juice), olive oil, eggs, Worcestershire sauce, anchovies, garlic, Dijon mustard, Parmesan and black pepper.

The salad was created on July 4, 1924, by Caesar Cardini at Caesar's in Tijuana, Mexico, when the kitchen was overwhelmed and short on ingredients. It was originally prepared tableside, and it is still prepared tableside at the original venue.

== History ==
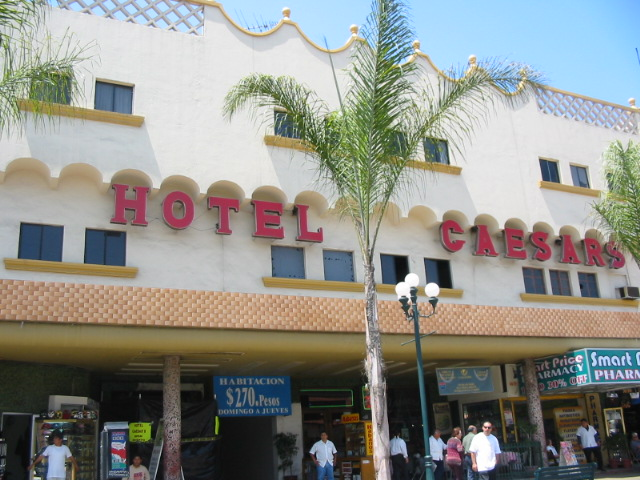
Hotel Caesar's in Avenida Revolución in Tijuana

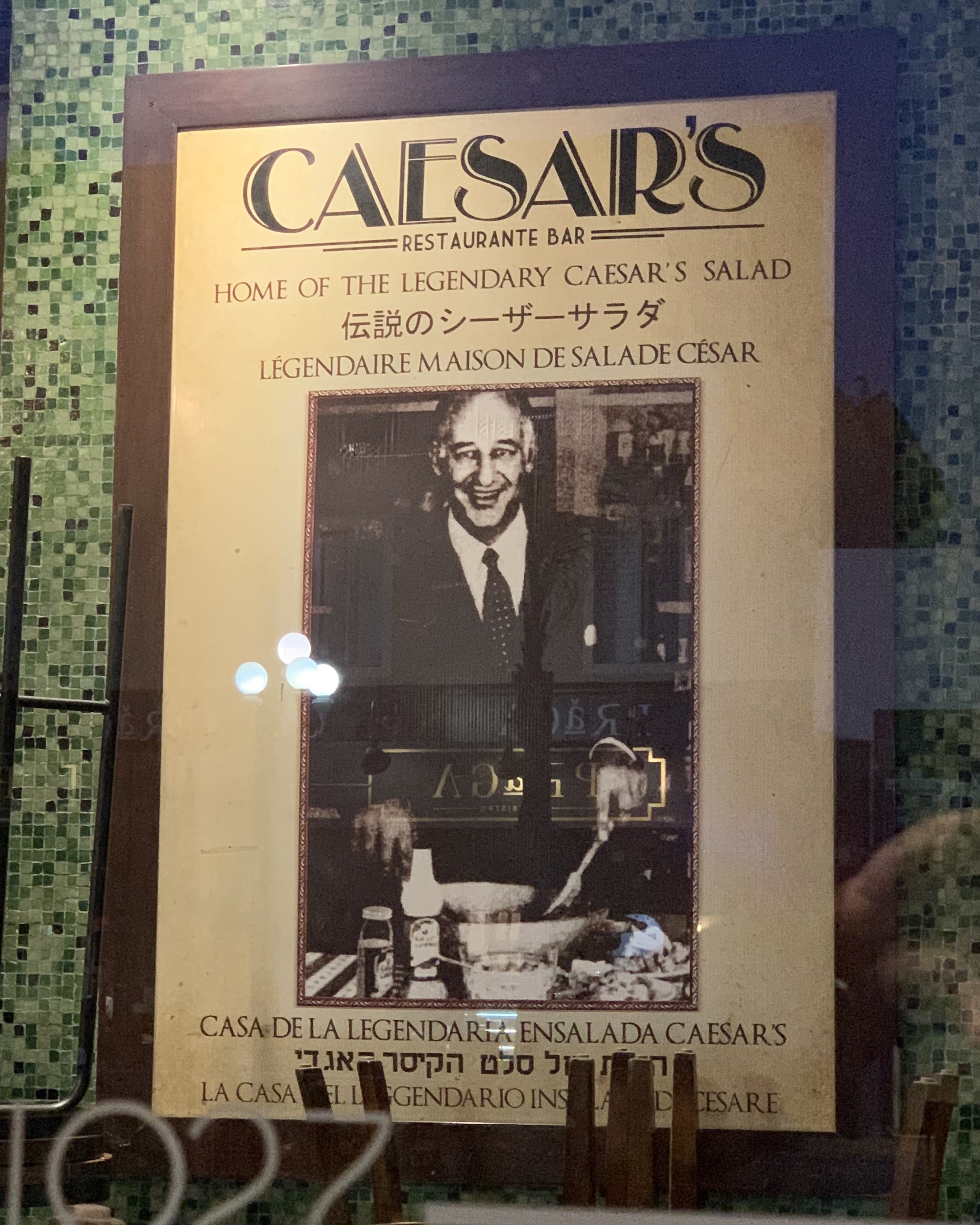
A poster inside Hotel Caesar's saying "Home of the legendary Caesar's Salad"

The salad's creation is generally attributed to the restaurateur Caesar Cardini, an Italian immigrant who operated restaurants in Mexico and the United States. Cardini lived in San Diego, but ran one of his restaurants, Caesar's, in Tijuana, Mexico, to attract American customers seeking to circumvent the restrictions of Prohibition. His daughter, Rosa, recounted that her father invented the salad at the Tijuana restaurant when a Fourth of July rush in 1924 depleted the kitchen's supplies. Cardini made do with what he had, adding the dramatic flair of table-side tossing by the chef. Some other accounts of the history state that Alex Cardini, Caesar Cardini's brother, made the salad, and that the salad was previously named the "Aviator Salad" because it was made for aviators who traveled over during Prohibition. A number of Cardini's staff have also said that they invented the dish. A popular myth attributes its invention to Julius Caesar. A 2024 book confirmed the claim that Caesar Cardini originated the recipe. Livio Santini's son, Aldo, countered that his father provided the recipe while working as a cook in Cardini's restaurant.

The American chef and writer Julia Child said that she had eaten a Caesar salad at Cardini's restaurant in her youth during the 1920s, made with whole romaine lettuce leaves, which were meant to be lifted by the stem and eaten with the fingers, tossed with olive oil, salt, pepper, lemon juice, Worcestershire sauce, coddled eggs, Parmesan, and croutons made with garlic-infused oil. In 1946, the newspaper columnist Dorothy Kilgallen wrote of a Caesar containing anchovies, differing from Cardini's version:

The big food rage in Hollywood—the Caesar salad—will be introduced to New Yorkers by Gilmore's Steak House. It's an intricate concoction that takes ages to prepare and contains (zowie!) lots of garlic, raw or slightly coddled eggs, croutons, romaine, anchovies, parmeasan [sic] cheese, olive oil, vinegar and plenty of black pepper.

In a 1952 interview, Cardini said the salad became well known in 1937, when Manny Wolf, story editor and Paramount Pictures writer's department head, provided the recipe to Hollywood restaurants.

In the 1970s, Child published a recipe in her book From Julia Child's Kitchen, based on an interview with Cardini's daughter, in which the ingredients are tossed one-at-a-time with the lettuce leaves. Cardini's daughter and several other sources have testified that the original recipe used only Worcestershire sauce, not anchovies, mustard, or herbs, which Cardini considered too bold in flavor. Contemporary recipes typically include anchovies as a key ingredient, and are frequently emulsified or based on mayonnaise.

== Dressing ==
Bottled Caesar dressings are produced and marketed by many companies, including Cardini's, Bolthouse Farms, Ken's Foods, Marzetti, Newman's Own, Panera Bread, Trader Joe's, and Whole Foods Market. The trademark brands Cardini's, Caesar Cardini's and Original Caesar Dressing are all claimed to date to February 1950, but were registered decades later.

== Ingredients ==
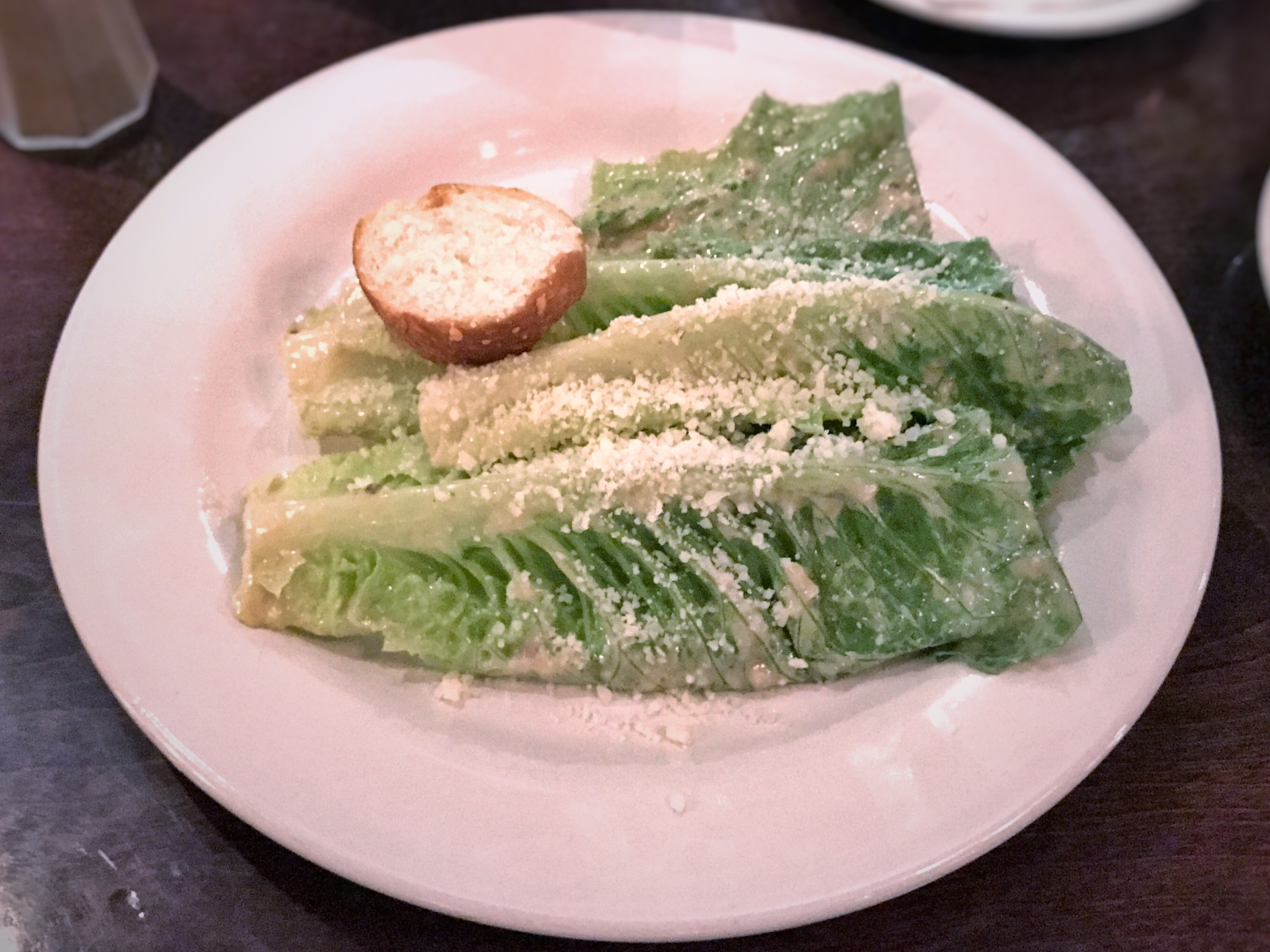
Caesar salad at Caesar's restaurant

Common ingredients in many recipes:

- Romaine lettuce
- olive oil
- crushed garlic
- salt
- Dijon mustard
- black pepper
- lemon juice
- Worcestershire sauce
- anchovies
- whole eggs or egg yolks, raw, poached or coddled
- grated Parmesan cheese
- croutons

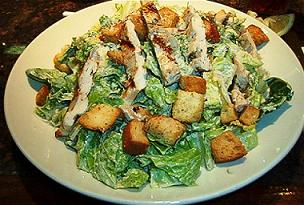
Topped with grilled chicken

Variations include varying the leaf, adding meat such as grilled chicken or bacon, or omitting ingredients such as anchovies and eggs. While the original Caesar's in Tijuana uses lime juice in their current recipe, most modern recipes use lemon juice or vinegar.

Some chefs experiment more broadly with variations of the salad, using the familiar, appealing "Caesar" name to attract diners to dishes with a similar hit of "umami, fat, and tons of salt" that otherwise bear little resemblance to the original.

== See also ==
- List of salads
