= Valle de Guadalupe =

Town and wine region in Baja California, Mexico

- Town
- Valle de Guadalupe
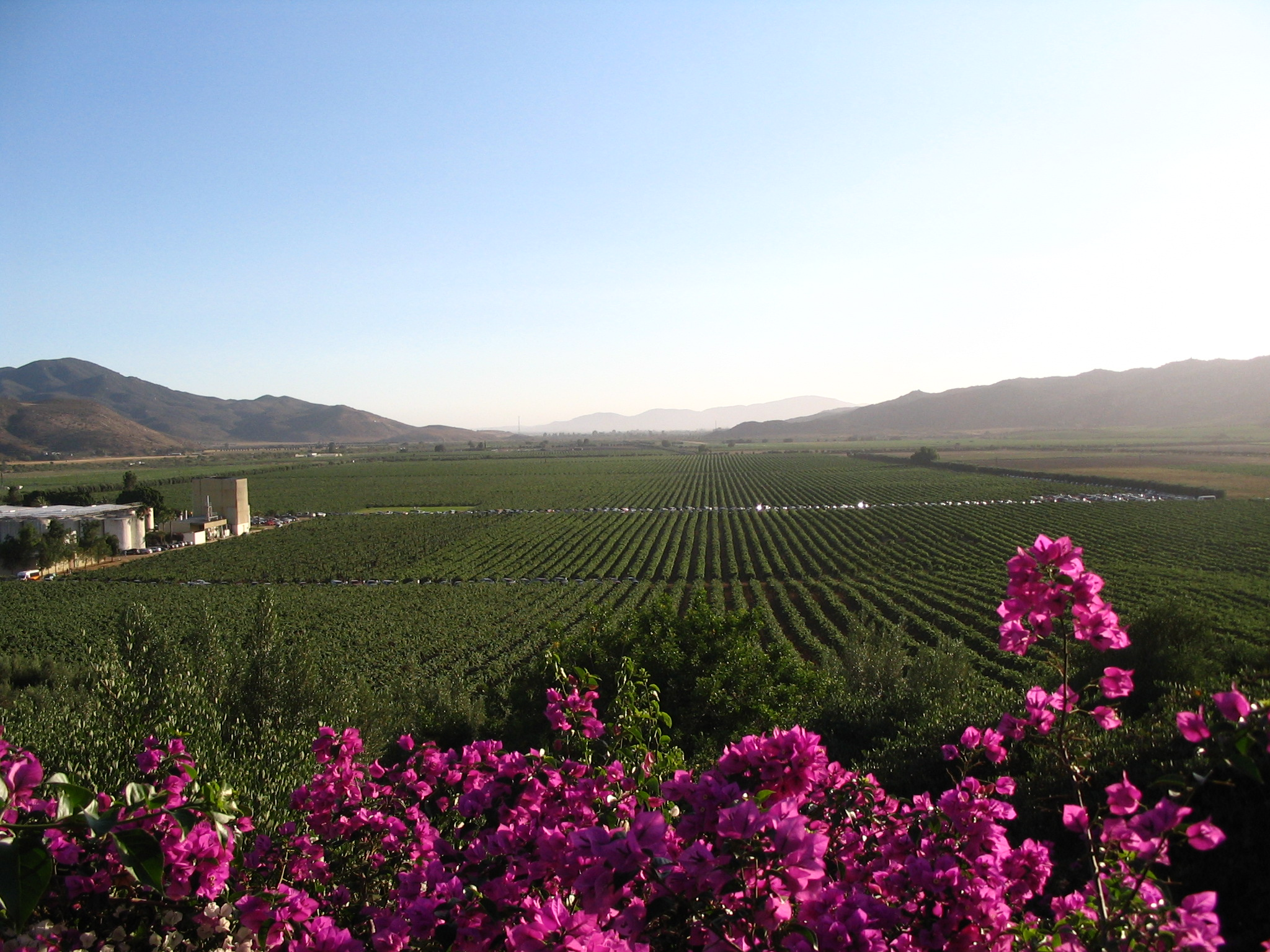
- Valle de Guadalupe
- Interactive map of Valle de Guadalupe
- Location in Mexico Valle de Guadalupe (Mexico)
- Coordinates: 32°05′52″N 116°34′01″W
- Country: Mexico
- State: Baja California
- Municipality: Ensenada
- Elevation: 1,129 ft (344 m)

Population (2010)
  - Total: 5,859
- Time zone: UTC-8 (Northwest US Pacific)
  - Summer (DST): UTC-7 (Northwest)

The Valle de Guadalupe (Guadalupe Valley) is an agricultural region in the Ensenada Municipality, Baja California, Mexico that produces an estimated 70 percent of Mexican wine. In recent years, it has become a popular tourist destination for wine and Baja Med cuisine.

The Valle de Guadalupe is located 20 kilometres (12 mi) north of the City of Ensenada and 113 kilometres (70 mi) southeast of the border crossing from San Diego to Tijuana. Its administrative units are Ejido El Porvenir, Francisco Zarco, San Antonio de las Minas, and Colonia Articulo 115. The valley had a population of 5,859 according to the 2010 census.

== Landscape and Climate ==
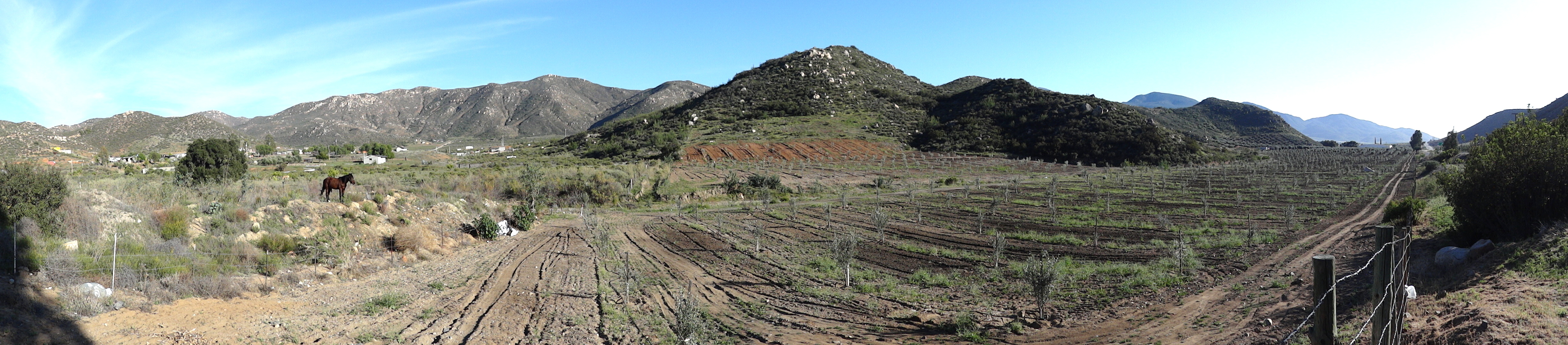
Panorama of Valle de Guadalupe, 2012

The Valle de Guadalupe, approximately 66,353 hectares (163,960 acres), is rimmed with granite hills. The Guadalupe Arroyo (River) runs beneath a smooth valley floor, resulting in sandy but fertile soil. Water appears on the surface only during periods of heavy rain. In January 1862, the river rose so high that "it looked like an ocean," according to one early resident.

The valley slopes gently from northeast to southwest with an average elevation of 344 metres (1,129 ft) above sea level. The margins of the plain are composed of alluvial fans and colluvium of reddish soil from the surrounding hillsides. Chaparral grows along the rocky slopes and live oak trees can be found in humid narrow canyons. Agave and cactus grow throughout the region, while small groves of pine trees can be found on the highest hills.

The valley has a Mediterranean climate with cool rainy winters and dry warm summers. The temperature, moderated by ocean breezes, averages 5 °C (41 °F) in winter and 30 °C (86 °F) in the summer.

== Economy ==
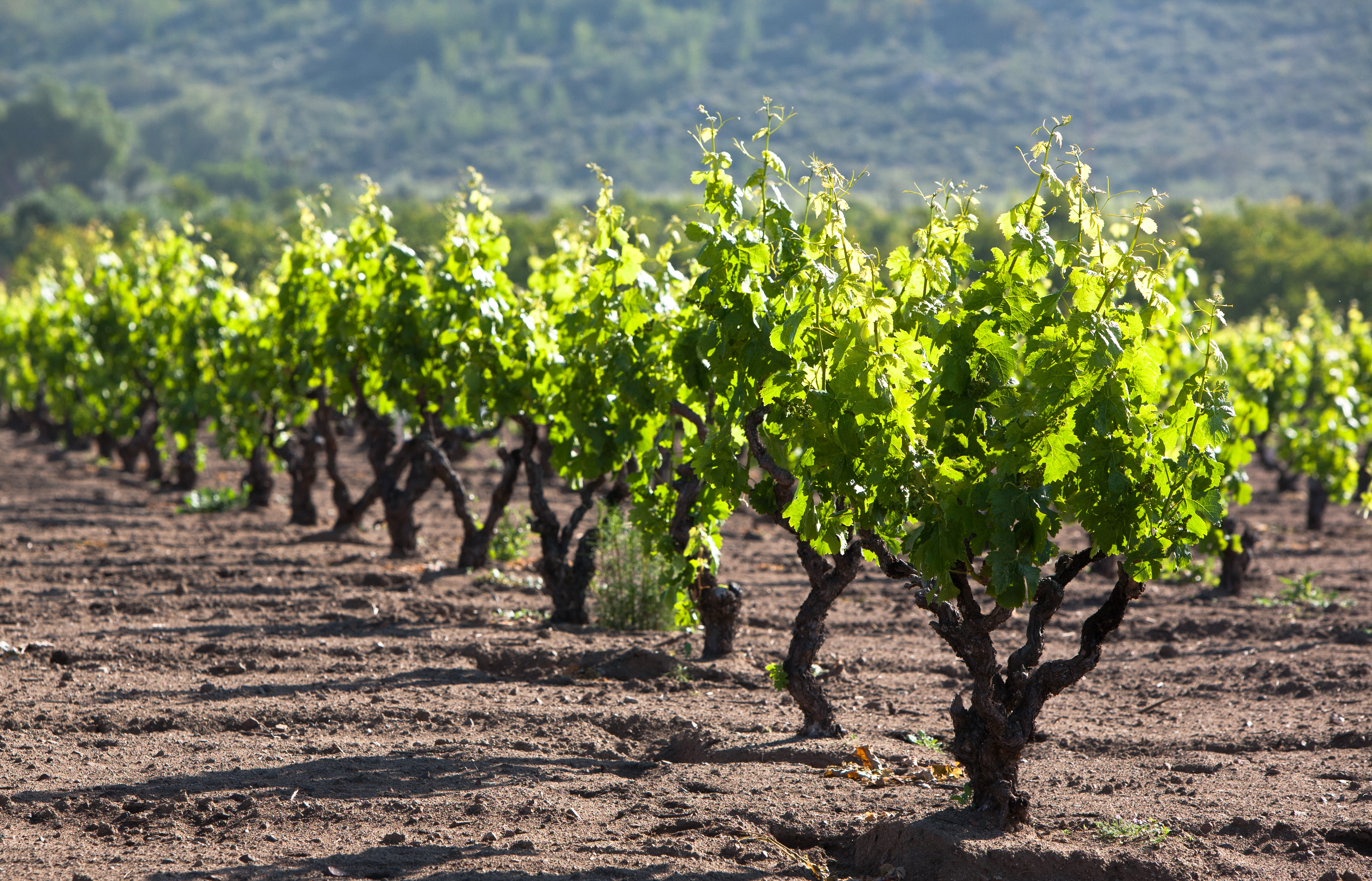
Carignan grape vineyard in the Valle de Guadalupe

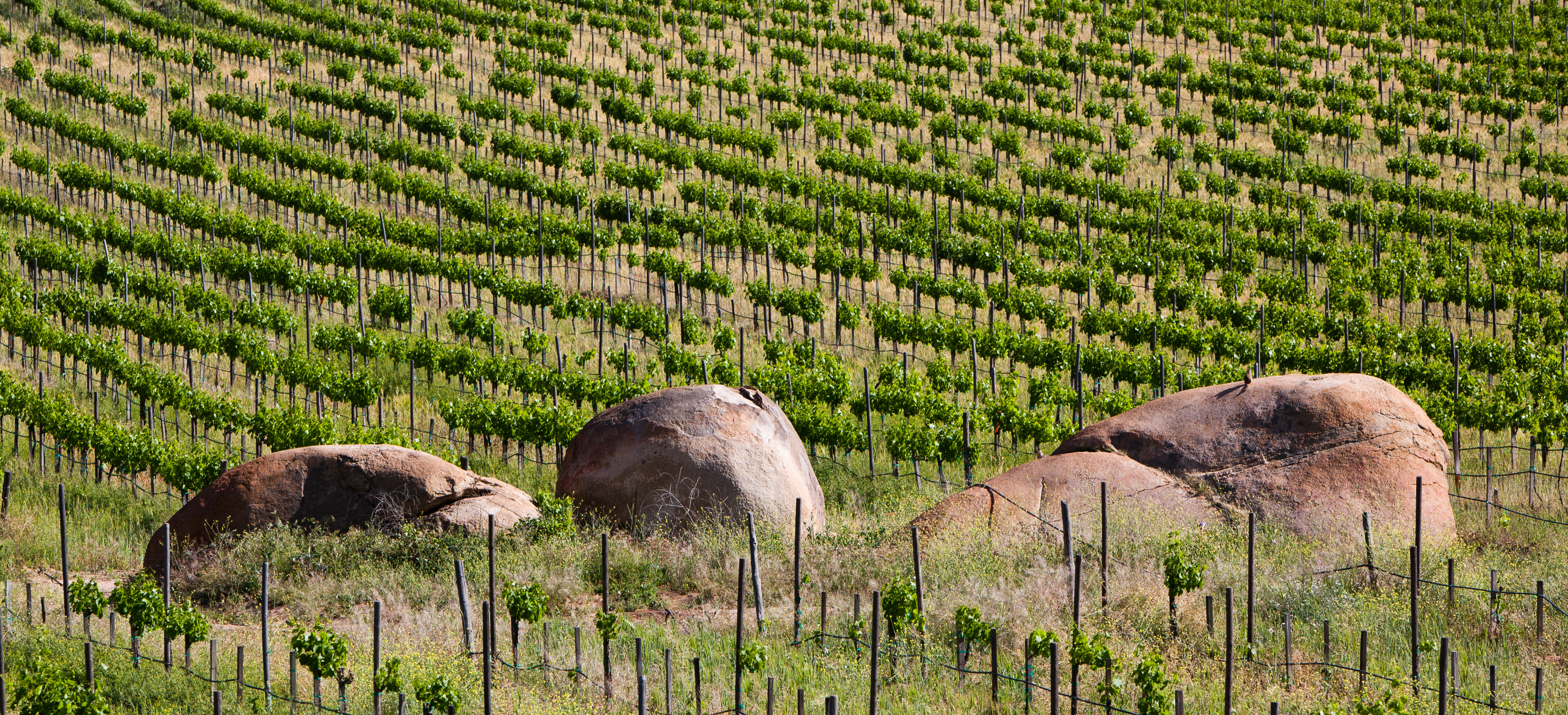
Viñedos in Baja California, 2012

The Valle de Guadalupe is unusual in Mexico for its ability to grow grapes for wine making, with the result that vinifera grapes are the highest value crop. The mild climate means that vintners grow a wide range of grapes, from Malbec and Sauvignon Blanc to Tempranillo. Red Bordeaux varietals are most typical. Grapes are also grown in the San Antonio, Santo Tomás, and San Vincente valleys. Other crops include olive and orange trees, European vegetables, organic horticulture-herbs, fruit, and honey. Cattle continue to graze in the valley. Both Valle de Guadalupe and Ensenada rely on groundwater pumping from the Guadalupe Valley Aquifer for their water supply.

The number of wineries in the area expanded from 6 in 1999 to 25 in 2005, among them big volume producers like L.A. Cetto, Santo Tomás, and Domecq. By 2023, the valley boasted 150 wineries, 92 hotels and boutiques, and 12 taco stands.

Tourism focused on the theme of wine and Baja Med cuisine is a source of economic growth, bringing in an estimated US$180 million in annual revenue to Baja California. This has led to the development of festivals such as the Valle de Guadalupe Vendimia Wine Harvest Festival. There has also been significant real estate development. It is estimated that 18 percent of the agricultural and wine region in the valley was lost to urban development between 2014 and 2019.

== History ==
=== Kumeyaay and Kiliwa ===
Archaeological research suggests that the valley is part of the San Dieguito complex and has been occupied for the last 7,000 to 10,000 years. The Kumeyaay (Kumiai) named the area Ojá cuñurr (painted cave) after a large, overhanging granite boulder inscribed with colored pictographs, likely the site of large ceremonial gatherings.

Kumeyaay and Kiliwa lived in rancherías in the valley, the largest of which was Rincón de los Encinos. A grove of Coast Live Oaks (Quercus agrifolia) defines the location of the settlement. In 1885, there were more than 330 indigenous people living in the valley. By the 1920s, geographer Peveril Meigs found only half a dozen Indian families at San José, Agua Escondida, Rincón de los Encinos, and San Antonio de Nicuárr. Kumeyaay continue to live at San Antonio Necua and other sites in the region.

=== Misión Nuestra Señora de Guadalupe del Norte ===
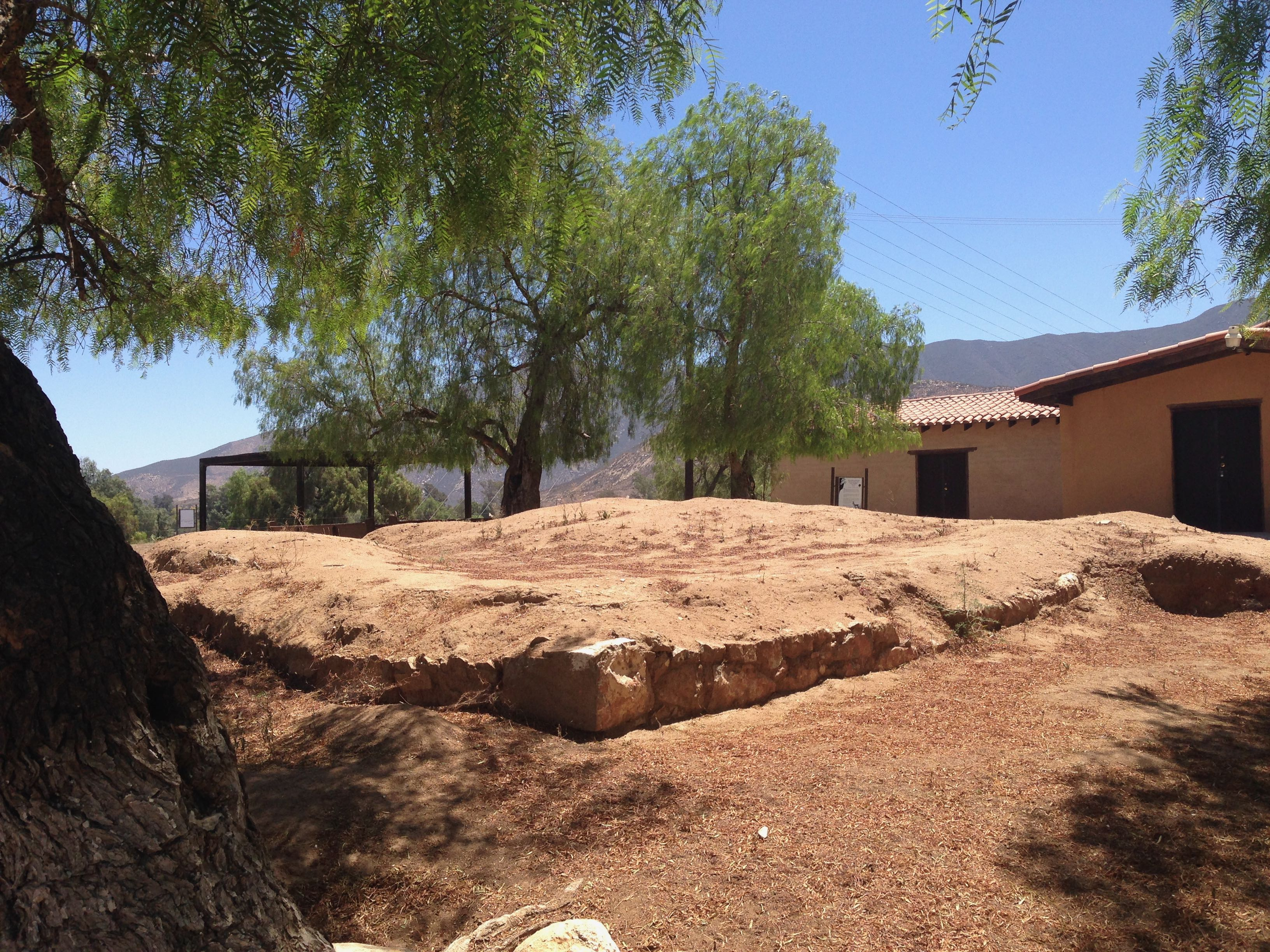
Ruins of the ex-Misíon de Guadalupe, Valle de Guadalupe, BC

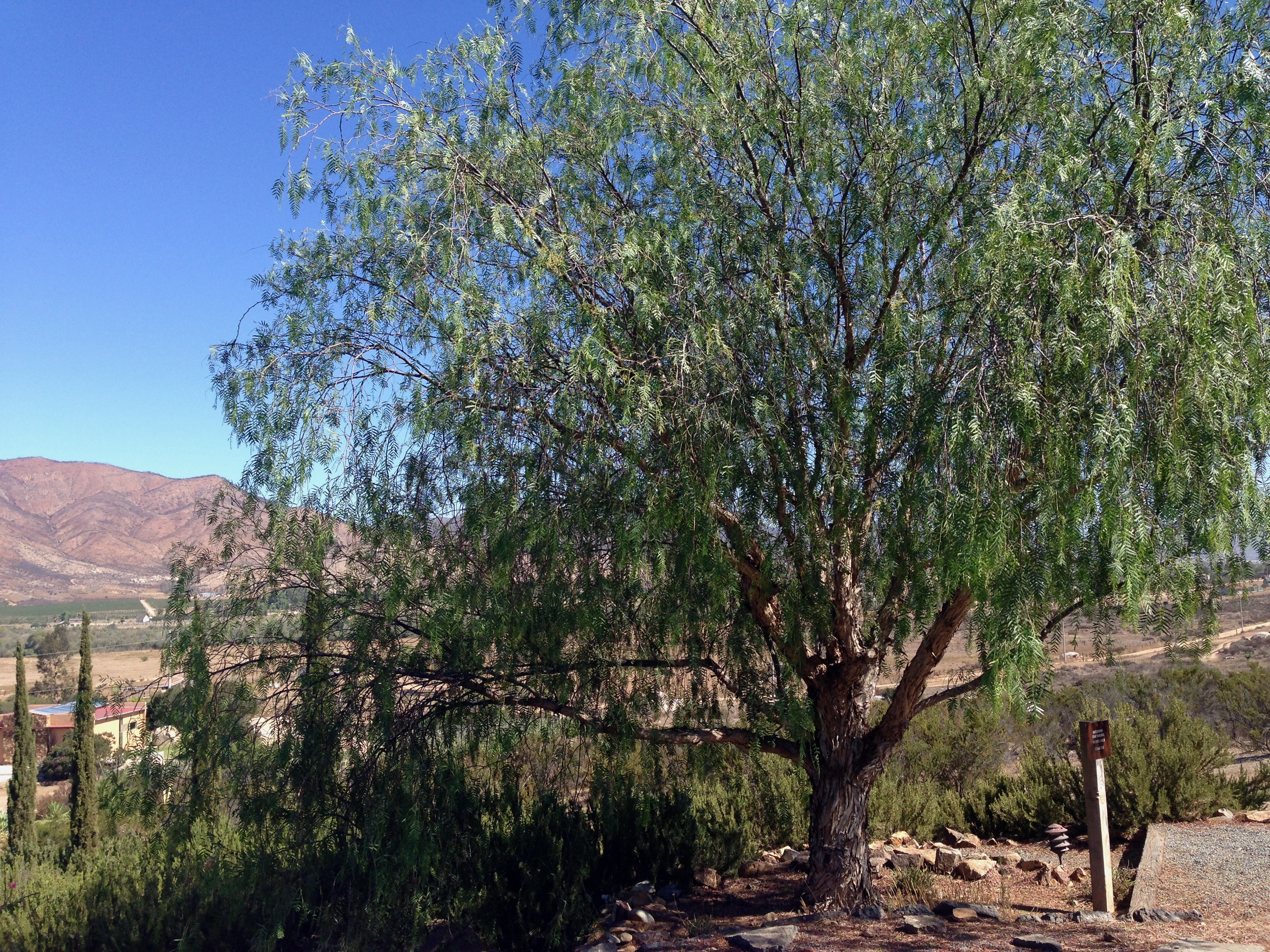
Pepper tree (Schinus molle) in the Valle de Guadalupe. Pepper trees came to Spanish California from Peru, brought by missionaries

The valley was the site of the last Dominican mission in Baja California, established in 1834 after the Mexican War of Independence. Misión de Nuestra Señora de Guadalupe del Norte was founded by the Dominican missionary Father Félix Caballero to serve as the administrative center of the region. The mission, together with neighboring missions at El Descanso, San Miguel, and Santa Catarina, were excluded from the Mexican secularization act of 1833 until such time as the current missionaries either retired or died.

Misión de Nuestra Señora de Guadalupe was built in a quadrangle. It had a church with a choir and two altars and a residence for the minister and provincial vicar. Colonists who accompanied Father Caballero lived in a ranch house located 2.5 miles (4.0 km) west of the mission, a structure that still exists, albeit in poor condition. Nearly 5,000 head of cattle grazed in pasturelands along the river, and the soil supported the cultivation of wheat, vegetables, grape vines, and fruit trees.

This mission survived only until 1840, however, when Jatñil, captain of the Cañon de Nejí, who had previously provided support to the missions, led a rebellion in response to forced conversions of his people. Caballero abandoned this mission together with three others in his charge and died soon afterwards in Loreto.

=== La Frontera ===
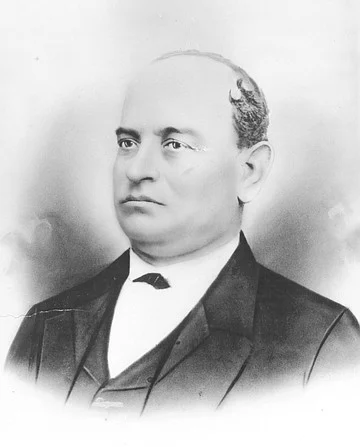
José Matías Moreno (1819-1869), a Mexican patriot and major landowner in the Valle de Guadalupe

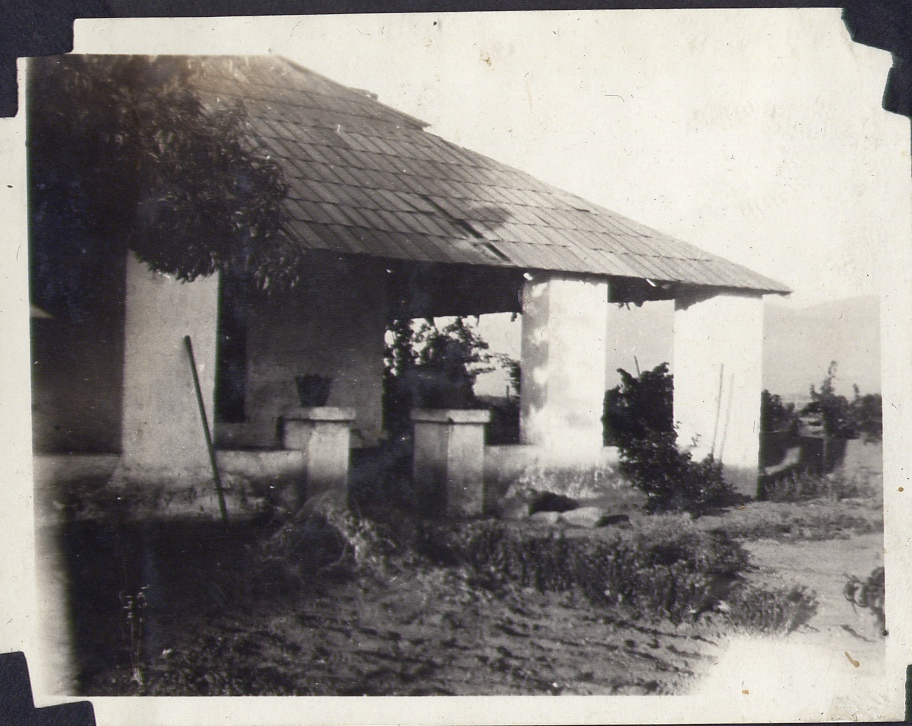
Ranch house, ex-Misión de Guadalupe, later the Moreno, Flower, and Barré family home, Valle de Guadalupe, ca. 1900

In the 1840s, the Mexican government opened ex-mission lands to colonization by private individuals, a decision opposed by the Spanish-born Dominican priest Father Gabriel González, among others. Rancho ex-Misión de Guadalupe was granted to Juan Bandini, a Peruvian-born Californio, in a move of dubious legality.

During the U.S.-Mexico War, José Matías Moreno II, secretary of state to Alta California Governor Pío Pico, raised a company of guerrilla soldiers in the area to combat U.S. forces in Baja California. He was arrested after the Skirmish of Todos Santos along with Father Gabriel González and many other prominent Mexican leaders. All were sent to Mazatlán where they remained prisoners until the signing of the Treaty of Guadalupe Hidalgo.

In 1858, in the wake of a Gold Rush in Baja California the Mexican government sold what it described as terrines baldíos or "unoccupied" lands in the Valle de Guadalupe. Ignoring the rights of indigenous people who lived in rancherías in the area, the government divided the valley into several large ranches: Ex-Misión de Guadalupe (13,014 acres (5,267 ha)), San Marcos or Huecos y Baldíos (12,355 acres (5,000 ha)), Santa Cruz (6,177 acres (2,500 ha)), San Antonio (6,177 acres (2,500 ha)), and El Tigre (8,676 acres (3,511 ha)).

In 1861, José Matías Moreno II returned to the valley as subjefe político de La Frontera (deputy military chief) commissioned to protect the interests of the Mexican government. He and a garrison of troops made their headquarters at Rancho ex-Misíon de Guadalupe where they worked to undermine filibusters, or unauthorized military expeditions that aimed to capture and annex Lower California. He enforced a 1853 law prohibiting foreigners from owning land within 60 miles of the border, among them Juan Bandini who had supported the North Americans during the U.S.-Mexico War and was considered a traitor by the Mexican government.

Moreno's loyalty to the Mexican government made it possible for him to purchase Bandini's former ranchos. In 1863, Moreno secured a clear title to Rancho ex-Misíon de Guadalupe which included a ruined adobe house, 2,000 grape vines in poor condition, an orchard, and farmland. He and his wife Prudenciana Vallejo López de Moreno proceeded to develop a working ranch. They used the adobe house formerly occupied by the ex-mission's colonists as their home.

=== Land Speculation and Foreign Investment ===
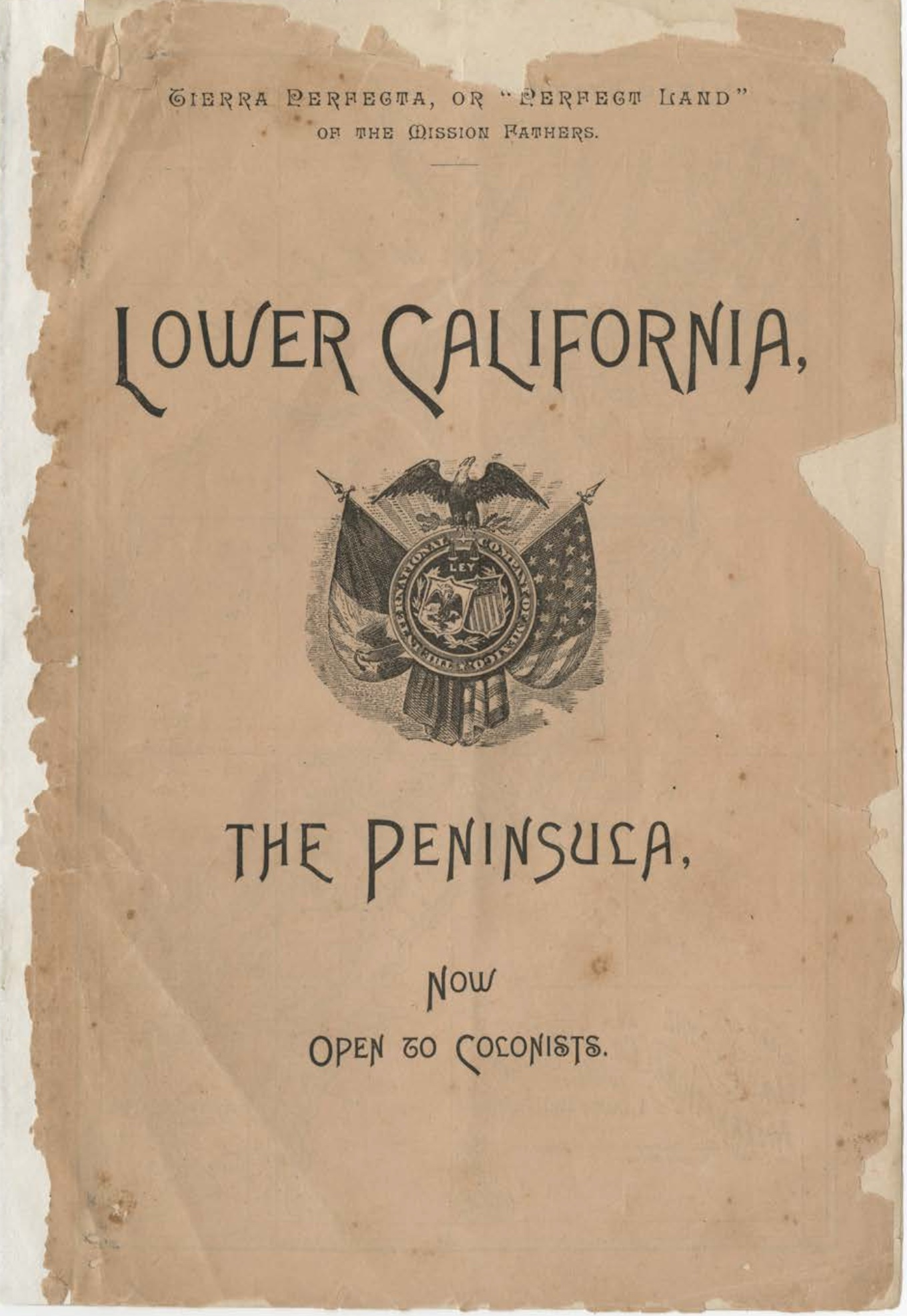
"Lower California: 'Tierra Perfecta,' or Perfect Land" (1887), published by the International Company of Mexico.

In the 1870s and 1880s, land speculation in California reached a fevered pitch, spurred by the arrival of the transcontinental railroad. Real estate interests anticipated that railroad lines would spread across California and Baja California, bringing people, large-scale agricultural production, and industry.

The policies of Porfirio Díaz, president of Mexico from 1877 to 1911, encouraged foreign investment. North American, British, and French capitalists looked to develop the entire northern half of the peninsula, most notably the International Company of Mexico, headquartered in Hartford, Connecticut (later the London-based Mexican Land & Colonization Company). Steamships traveled between San Diego and Ensenada, making possible the development of a port and related industries.

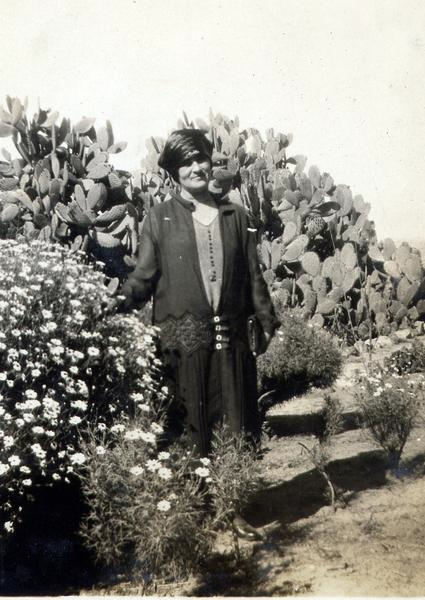
Lucina Flower Moreno de Barré (1876-1928) spent her life in the Valle de Guadalupe

In the Valle de Guadalupe, a pair of enterprising brothers, George A. Flower and Theron A. Flower, worked to get hold of the Rancho ex-Misión de Guadalupe after the death of Jose Matías Moreno. George, age 39, courted and married the Morenos' 16-year-old daughter Dolores in 1871. Theron A. Flower, meanwhile, loaned the estate $7,000, and tried to foreclose when the family could not meet its obligations. After a lengthy lawsuit initiated by José Matías Moreno III, Theron Flower purchased the Rancho ex-Misión de Guadalupe for $15,000 in 1887. The Morenos retained Rancho San Marcos and El Tigre, among other properties, until 1943 when the last of the ranch lands were sold. Lucina Flower Moreno de Barré was one of the last family members to live on the estate.

In the 1890s, the real estate bubble burst, causing development to stall. For a time, the valley remained an agricultural region adjacent to the city of Ensenada which had become integrated into the economy of Southern California.

=== Russian Colony ===
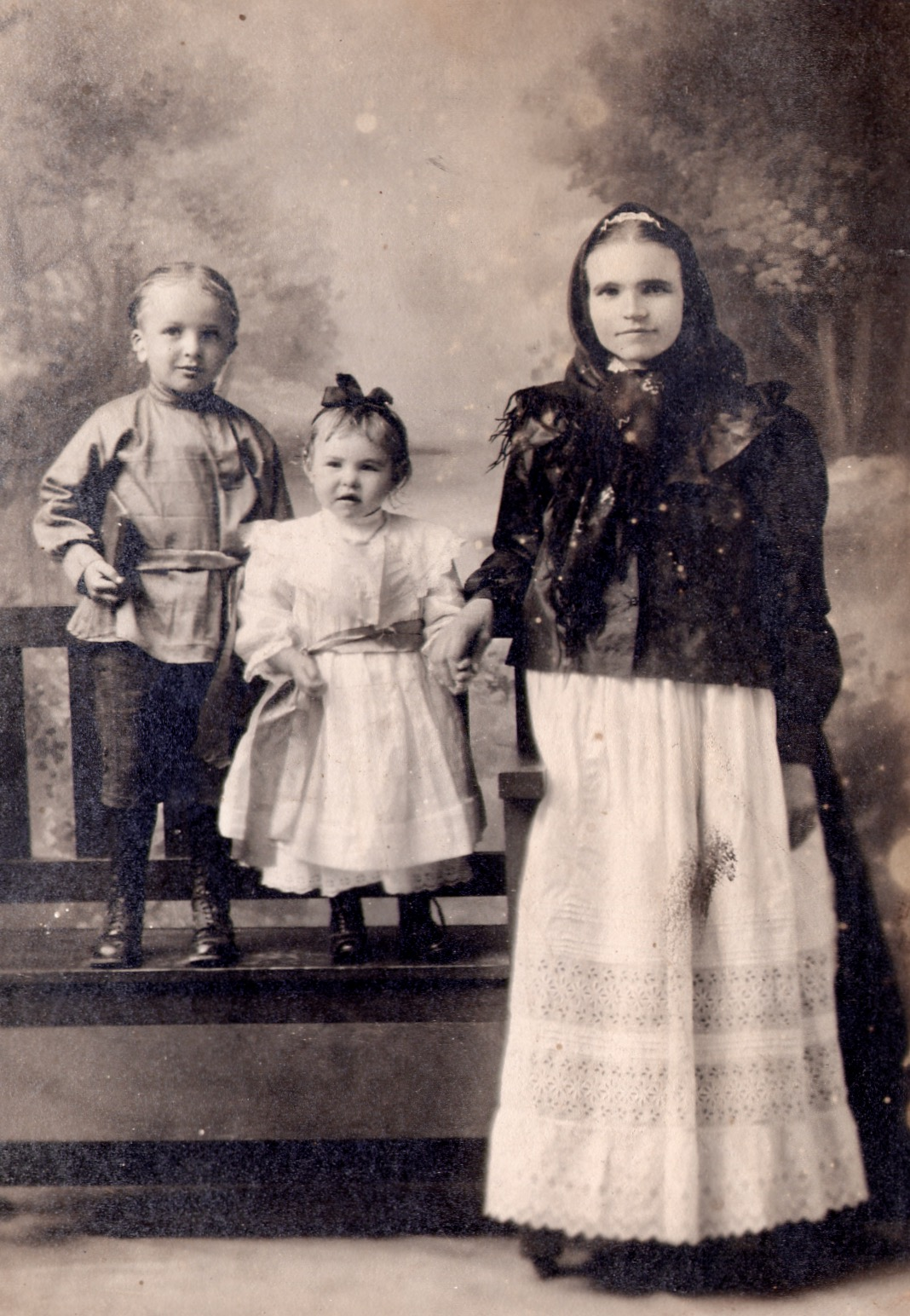
The Abakumoffs, Russian Molokan colonists, the Valle de Guadalupe, ca. 1915-20

Rancho ex-Misión de Guadalupe changed hands several times before being sold in 1905 to a colony of Russian Molokans, religious dissenters who fled persecution in their own country. A mixture of Spiritual Christian faiths, mostly Pryguny, the colonists formed the Russian Colonizing Enterprise of Lower California Cooperative Society, and settled in four farming colonies near Ensenada. The main colony at Guadalupe occupied approximately 5,266 hectares (13,010 acres). Not all were ethnic Russians, and some were of various folk-Protestant (non-Orthodox) faiths with some Molokane from Transcaucasia, South Russia.

Between 1905 and 1911, approximately 104 families moved to Guadalupe and built a village in a linear settlement. The adobe houses were whitewashed in the manner of the Mexican adobe, but the roofs were shingled and steeply pitched in the Russian style. Molokans worshipped in a simple building without icons or statues and stressed sobriety, pacifism, and communalism.

In 1928, wheat was the only market crop produced by the Russian colony, but residents had orchards, vegetable gardens, and vineyards.

=== The Mexican Revolution and Land Reform ===
The Magonista rebellion of 1911, an early uprising of the Mexican Revolution, caused the first wave of Russian emigration out of the valley. The second major exodus took place after the Mexican government began to redistribute large tracts of private property as communal land. The ejido system was presented as an important component of land reform in Mexico. In 1937, the government reapportioned 2,920 hectares (7,200 acres) adjoining the Molokan colony to 58 ejidatários. This settlement became known as the ejido El Porvenir ("things to come").

In the late 1950s, the opening of Mexico Highway 3 (the Tecate-Ensenada Highway) brought squatters, or paracaidistas, who claimed portions of the valley as their own. They formed the poblado Francisco Zarco around the site of the old mission and engaged in acts of civil disobedience designed to drive both Russian and Mexican owners from their lands. By the early 1990s, there was only one family of rusus puros, or pure Russians, living in the valley. Some descendants of the original colony married into Ensenada families, however, and remain in the area.

=== Vineyards and Wineries ===
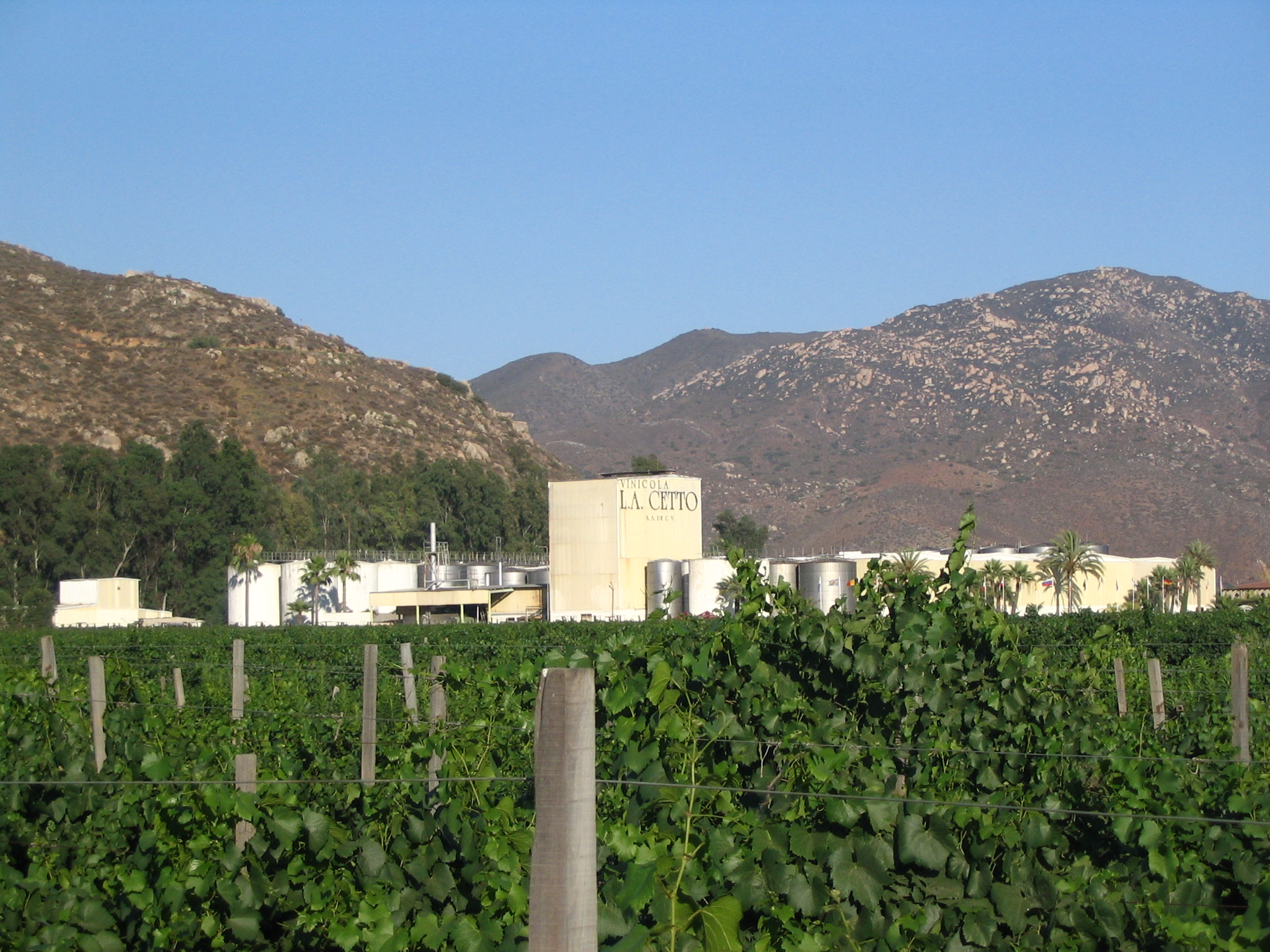
L.A. Cetto Winery in the Valle de Guadalupe, 2006

In the 1940s and 1950s, Tecate was the chief grape growing region in northern Baja. L.A. Cetto, a winery in Tijuana, produced more than 70 percent of all wines consumed in Mexico. As the border cities grew, however, vineyards became crowded out and the center of Mexican viticulture moved south to the Valle de Guadalupe.

In 1972, Casa Pedro Domecq began the modern winemaking industry in the valley. An educational program for local growers developed with the arrival of Hugo D'Acosta, one of Mexico's most renowned winemakers, and Hans Joseph Backhoff of Monte Xanic Winery. The number of wineries in the valley grew from 6 in 1999 to 25 in 2005. Around that time, boutique wineries offering food and lodging started to appear, relying on the natural beauty of the region to sell their products. Home winemakers also came on the scene, producing small batches for the tourist market.

In 2011, the Museo de la Vid y el Vino was established to promote wine tourism. Two private museums, one with a café, celebrate the history of Russian-speaking settlers in the region.

=== Recent Controversy ===
Around 2010, the valley was a site of agricultural production and "a quaint getaway" for visitors looking for a rustic alternative to the Napa Valley. By 2023, there were 150 wineries together with boutique hotels and restaurants aimed at tourists from Mexico City and the United States.

Real estate development and the growth of tourism has led to controversy in the region. Many community members feel that the agricultural economy cannot support unfettered urbanization that could drain the water supply. In October 2021, more than 300 people successfully protested the construction of a temporary amphitheater intended to hold 25,000 people, pointing out that the valley did not have the infrastructure to support an influx of visitors. In 2022, winemakers and others launched a preservation campaign called Rescatemos el Valle in order to emphasize the importance of agricultural land use.

== Wineries ==
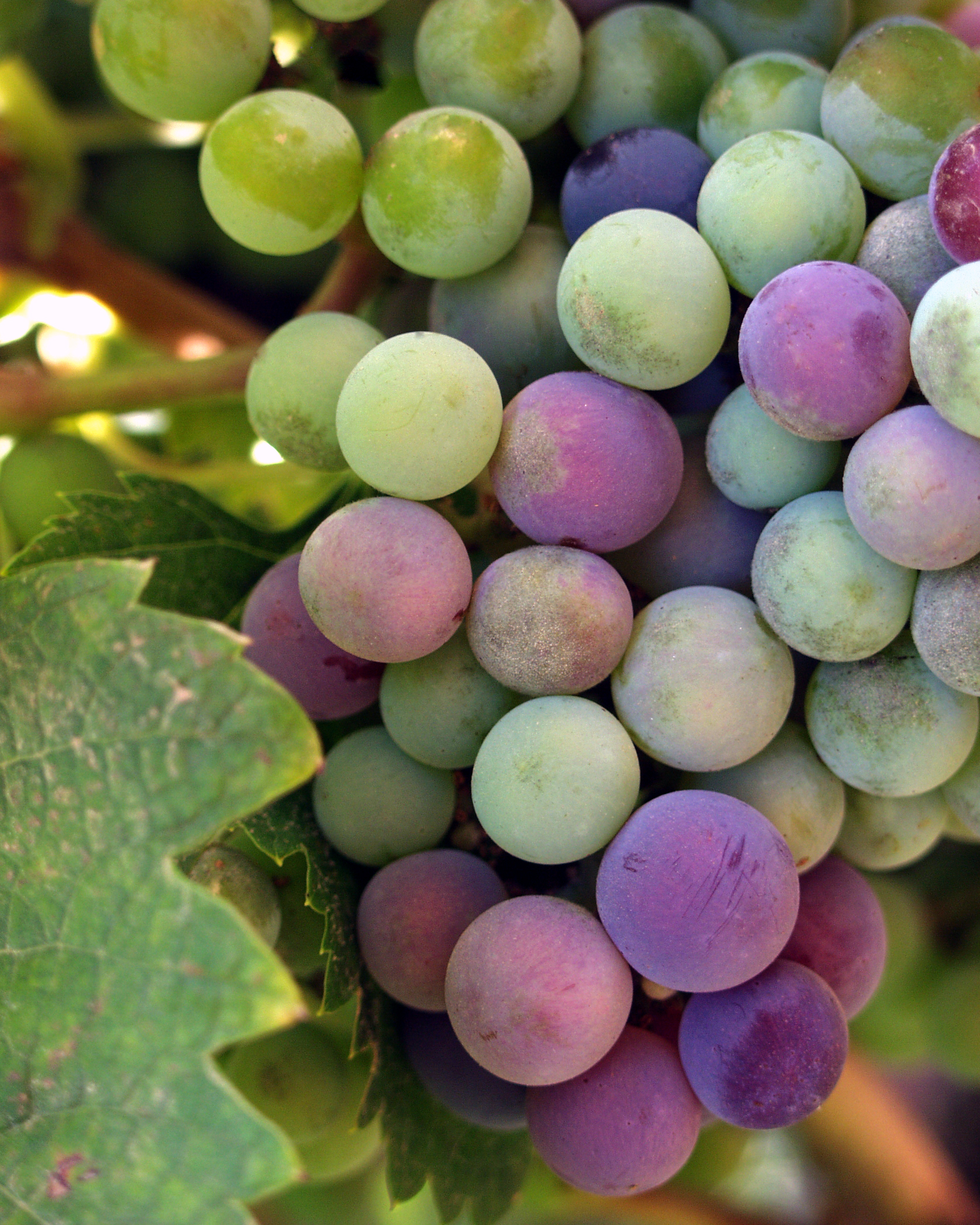
Wine during pigmentation, Valle de Guadalupe

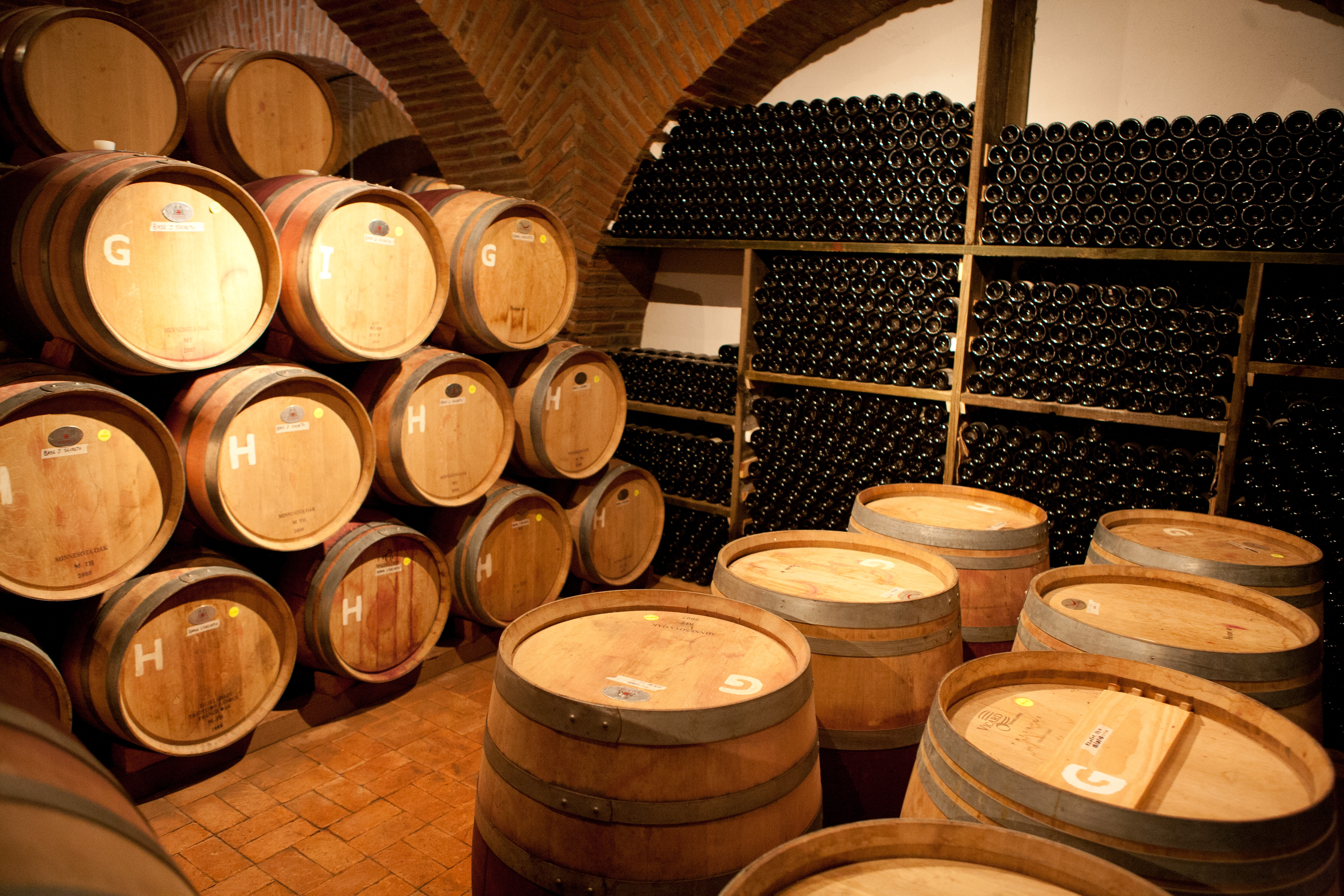
Adobe Guadalupe Winery

The Valle de Guadalupe's elevation and microclimate make it ideally suited for winemaking. In 2023, there were 150 wineries along the Valle's Ruta del Vino (Wine Route). Collectively, they account for 70 percent of all Mexico's wines.

Since the 1990s the Association of Winemakers of Baja California holds the Fiestas de la Vendimia (Wine Harvest Festival) in the Valle of Guadalupe and the town of Ensenada every year in August. The celebration includes wine tasting sessions, concerts and soirées, and samplings of regional cuisine and Mexican wines. Since 2017, the region has also held an annual festival in October.

Wine tasting is available year-round, and several of the wineries have built up-market restaurant/tasting establishments aimed specifically at tourists from the United States. A winery tour is usually included on cruise ships that stop at Ensenada.

There are over 100 wineries in the Valle de Guadalupe.

== Culinary scene ==
Many wineries in the Valle de Guadalupe have "campestre" restaurants on site that serve farm-to-table cuisine. Diego Hernández headed up Corazón de Tierra, rated by William Reed Business Media as one of Latin America's 50 best restaurants, before the COVID-19 pandemic caused it to close. Chef Javier Plascencia founded Finca de Altozano and Drew Deckman continues to operate Deckman's en el Mogor. The area is a center of Baja Med cuisine. More recent additions include Ojá Valle, a Kumeyaay-inspired restaurant that opened in 2022. Traditional eateries such as La Cocina de Doña Esthela remain very popular.

== Hotels ==
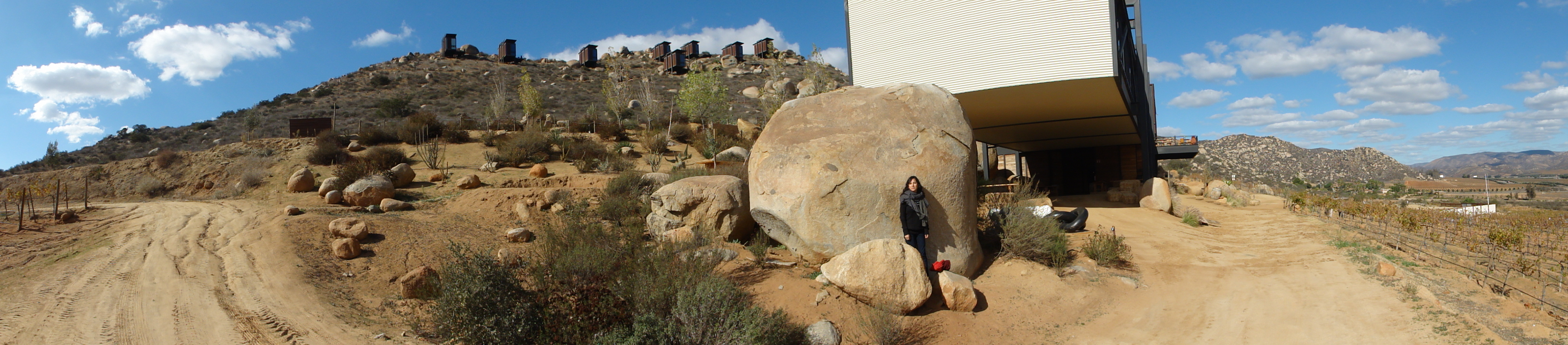
Hotel Endémico, Valle de Guadalupe, 2013

Hotels include chef Javier Plascencia's Finca la Divina, Bruma, a 200-acre eco-resort including a working winery, 2 villas, and a 8-room hotel, and Encuentro Guadalupe whose 20 eco-friendly rooms blend into the landscape.
