= Haco (company) =

Swiss food manufacturer

- Trade name: HACO AG
- Type: Private
- Industry: Food
- Founded: 1922
- Headquarters: Gümligen, Switzerland
- Number of locations: 12 production sites in 7 countries (HACO Group)
- Area served: Worldwide (more than 60 countries)
- Products: Coffee and tea extracts; cocoa and malt drinks; bouillons; soups; sauces; seasonings; ready meals
- Revenue: CHF 500 million (HACO Group, 2026)
- Number of employees: 1,600 (HACO Group, 2026)
- Subsidiaries: Narida AG
- Website: haco.ch

Haco (Haco AG) is a Swiss food manufacturer based in Gümligen, in the municipality of Muri bei Bern. Founded in 1922 in Bern, it initially produced pharmaceuticals and became a large producer in the food industry, making coffee and tea extracts, cocoa- and malt-based nutritional drinks, bouillons, soups, sauces, seasonings and ready meals for a worldwide market.

== History ==
The company was founded in 1922 in Bern as a cooperative at the instigation of the chemist Oscar Bally-Forcart and initially produced pharmaceuticals for the Haaf pharmacy in Bern. As early as 1923 it was converted into a joint-stock company (Aktiengesellschaft), whose shareholders came mainly from Basel financial circles, with its production site at Gümligen. Since 1929 the firm has worked with Migros, which, as a major customer, sells Haco products under its own brand. In 1965 the company gave up pharmaceutical research, which the future Nobel laureate Tadeusz Reichstein had led to great success.

In 1979 Narida AG was founded in Schwarzenburg; it was brought together with Haco under the umbrella of Haco Holding AG, Gümligen. In 2005 the company opened a new production plant in Malaysia to serve its export markets in Asia and North America.

Among Haco's significant innovations were the production of a decaffeinated coffee without harmful residues (1930), the synthesis of vitamin C (1931), the development of cortin and cortisone, the production of soluble coffee (1938) and freeze-dried coffee (1969), the decaffeination of tea (1979), and the production of cereal bars and the freeze-drying of tea extracts (1994). In 2005 the company, owned by about 160 shareholders, most of them descendants of the founding families, had about 550 employees.

== Bibliography ==
- 50 Jahre Haco AG Gümligen, 1972
- Die Zukunft hat begonnen, 1997
- Haco Swiss: Facts & Figures, 1998
