= Drew Deckman =

Georgian-born American chef and restaurateur

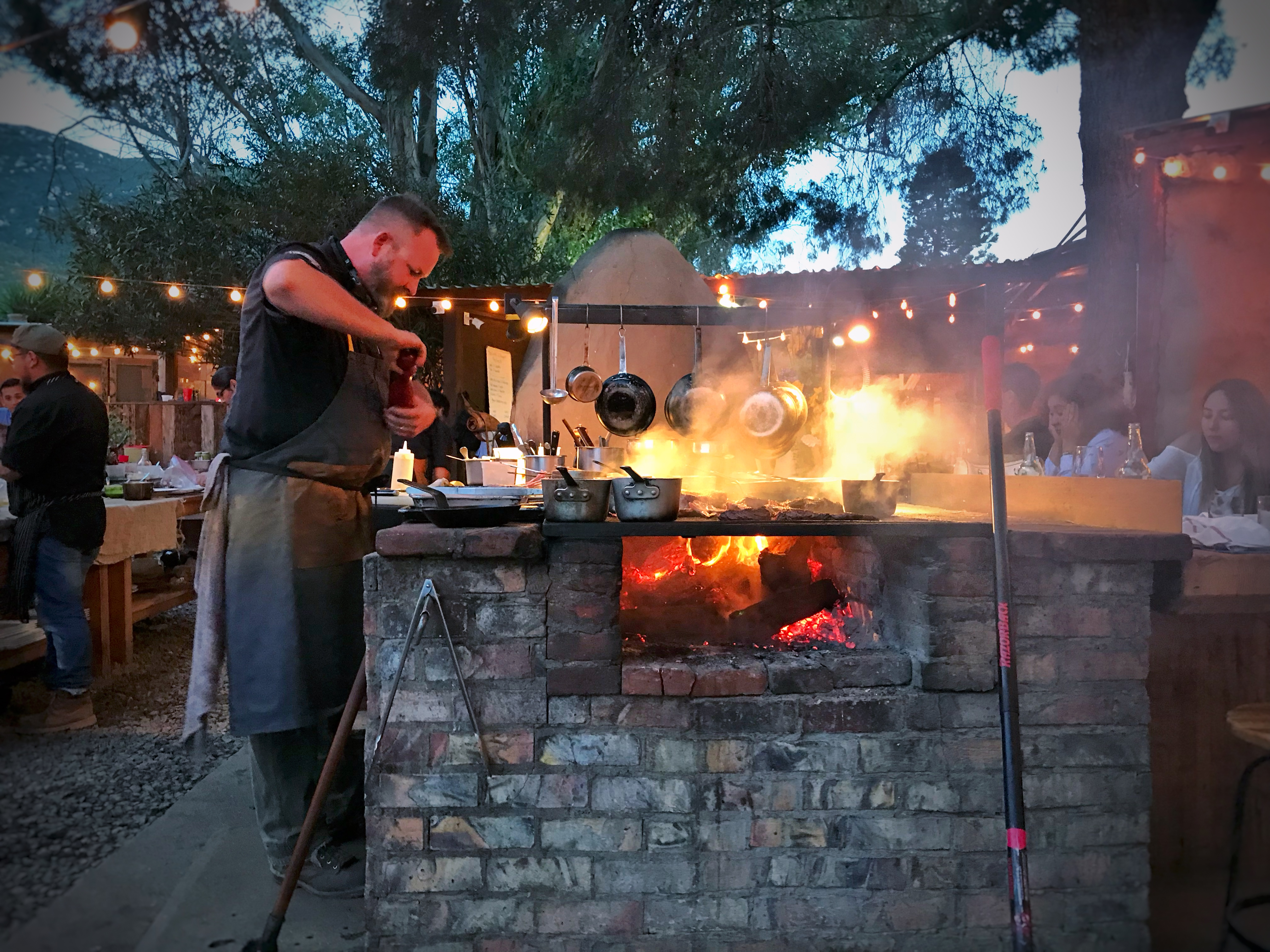
- Deckman in 2018
- Culinary career
- Rating: Michelin stars
- Website: deckmans.com

Drew M. Deckman is a Washington D.C.-born, Georgia-raised American-Mexican chef and restaurateur.

Born in Washington, D.C. and grew up in the state of Georgia, he worked at restaurants in Europe and was recognized by the Michelin Guide for his work at the Restaurant Vitus in Reinstorf. He then set up restaurants in Baja California – Deckman's en el Mogor in the Valle de Guadalupe and Deckman's at Havana in San Jose del Cabo.in 2018 he naturalized Mexican. In 2024, he opened Deckmans North @ 3131 in North Park, San Diego, his first restaurant in the United States. During the 2025 San Diego Padres season, Deckman opened a seafood stand at Petco Park.
