= Rachlin =

Rachlin is a surname. Notable people with the surname include:

- Ann Rachlin (1933–2023), British music educator
- Ezra Rachlin (1915–1995), American conductor and pianist
- Howard Rachlin (1935–2021), American psychologist
- Julian Rachlin (born 1974), Lithuanian violinist, violist and conductor
- Natan Rachlin (1905–1979), Ukrainian conductor
- Robert D. Rachlin, American lawyer
