= Contramar =

Seafood restaurant in Mexico City, Mexico

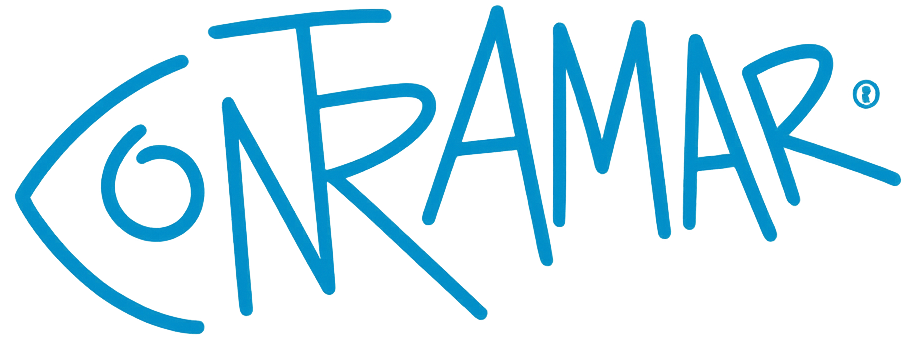

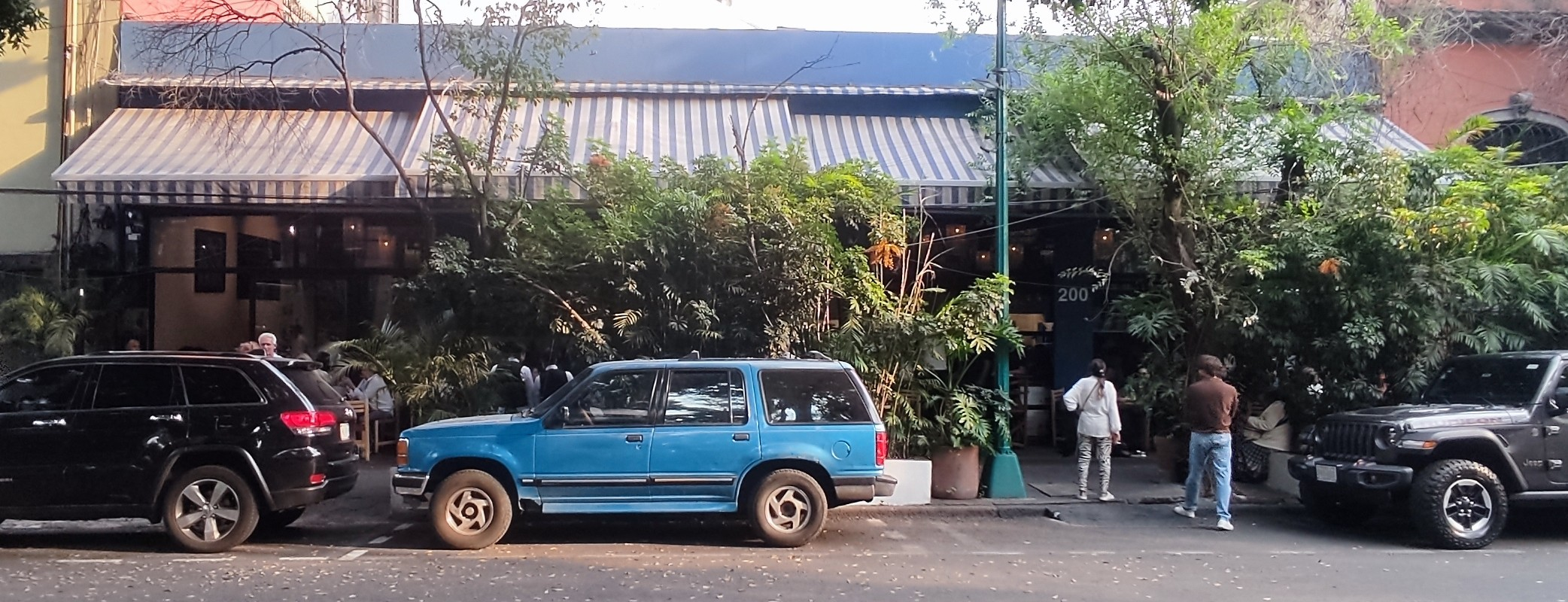
- The restaurant's exterior in 2025
- Interactive map of Contramar

Restaurant information
- Established: 14 August 1998; 28 years ago
- Owner: Gabriela Cámara
- Food type: Seafood
- Rating: Bib Gourmand (Michelin Guide, 2025)
- Location: Durango 200, Roma Norte, Cuauhtémoc, Mexico City, 06700, Mexico
- Coordinates: 19°25′10.5″N 99°10′01.8″W
- Reservations: Recommended
- Other information: Nearest station: Durango bus station
- Website: contramar.com.mx/

Contramar (Note: transl. "Against the sea") is a seafood restaurant in Roma Norte, Mexico City, Mexico, near Fuente de Cibeles. It is owned by the restaurateur Gabriela Cámara, who opened it in 1998 on Durango Avenue. Her aim was to recreate the experience of dining at a beachside palapa.

The establishment serves à la carte dishes and has received critical acclaim particularly for its tuna tostada. Its signature red-and-green pescado a la talla has been widely imitated by other restaurants worldwide. Contramar has attracted celebrities and international diners, received multiple culinary distinctions, and was the subject of the 2019 Netflix documentary – A Tale of Two Kitchens. In 2025, the restaurant received a Bib Gourmand recommendation in the second Michelin Guide covering restaurants in Mexico.

== Description ==
Contramar serves à la carte seafood. The restaurant created a supply platform that allows patrons to verify the traceability of the fish. According to El Economista, some seafood, including clams, is sourced from Puerto Libertad, Sonora, on Tuesdays, Fridays and Saturdays.

The oldest plate on Contramar's menu is pescado zarandeado, served since its opening. Other items served include Mexican-style seafood dishes as well as international dishes, like chowder or tiradito.

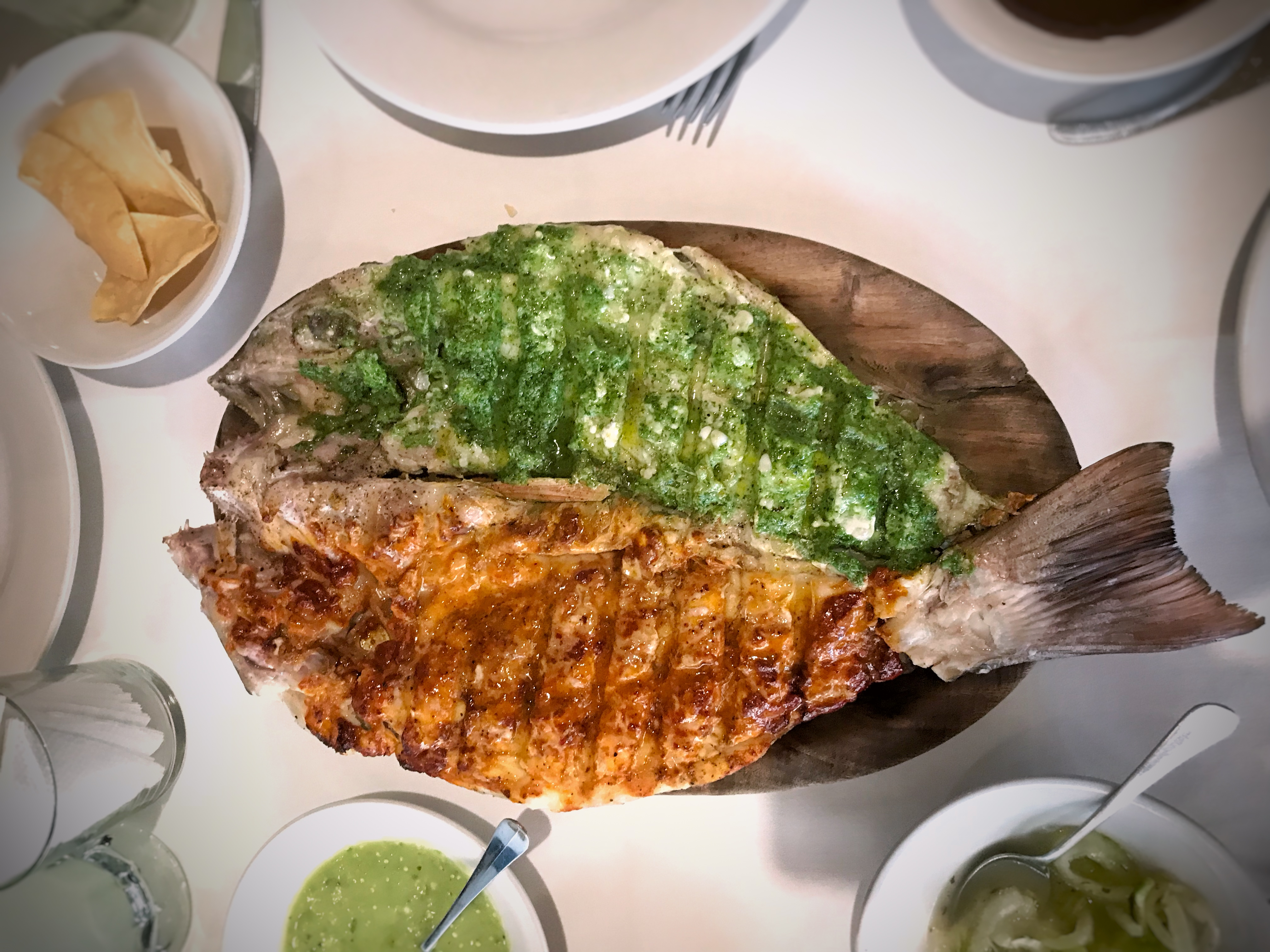
The fish dish pescado a la talla was popularized by Contramar

Two signature dishes at Contramar are the pescado a la talla (or red-and-green grilled snapper) and the tuna tostada. The former consists of a Northern red snapper fillet split in half, with one side topped with a parsley-based sauce and the other in adobo sauce. The tostada is prepared with thin slices of raw tuna, leek and avocado slices, and chipotle mayonnaise, served on maize toasted tortillas. At its core, the dish is tuna tartare on a crisp base.

The pescado a la talla is traditionally accompanied by black beans and tortillas, allowing it to be eaten as a taco. Its recipe has been adapted by restaurants worldwide due to the versatility of the red and green sauces. For instance, at Kalaya in Philadelphia, chef Nok Suntaranon adapts the dish with mackerel, jalapeño and chive to recreate the green sauce and a reddish coconut sauce mixed with ingredients from southern Thailand. Other adaptations replace the fish with chicken, or incorporate variations like tomatoes or ginger sauces.

Contramar has an open kitchen and a high ceiling. The restaurant's interior design resembles a palapa, with a large hand-carved dining in the middle of the room as late as 2016. The restaurant also features a Poemario (anthology of poems), a blackboard displaying sea-themed poems by writers such as Carlos Pellicer Cámara, Rosario Castellanos, José Emilio Pacheco, and Juana Inés de la Cruz.

== History ==
In 1996, while vacationing with a former boyfriend in Zihuatanejo, Gabriela Cámara conceived the idea of opening a restaurant in Mexico City that evoked the experience of dining in a beachside palapa. She states her goal was to offer the city's residents a way to enjoy that atmosphere if they were unable to travel to a coast.

Cámara and her associates acquired an inexpensive former refrigeration parts store in the emerging Colonia Roma. The ceiling was covered with straw mats and fish skeletons were painted on to the walls by Carlos Pellicer López (nephew of the Mexican poet Pellicer Cámara).

Contramar opened on 14 August 1998 on Durango Street, and is near the Durango bus station and the Fuente de Cibeles. Initially, passerby's were invited to eat and pay only if they liked the food. For a time, the restaurant employed only male waiters, several of whom had previous legal troubles.

Contramar has drawn a celebrity clientele that includes artists, politicians, musicians, and international visitors. A sister restaurant, Entremar, was opened in the city's Polanco neighborhood to reduce customers' wait times. A location called Cantina Contramar Las Vegas, located at the Fontainebleau Las Vegas on the Las Vegas Strip, United States, opened in 2026. It offers the same Contramar's signature dishes, but its menu focuses more on meat dishes.

== Reception ==
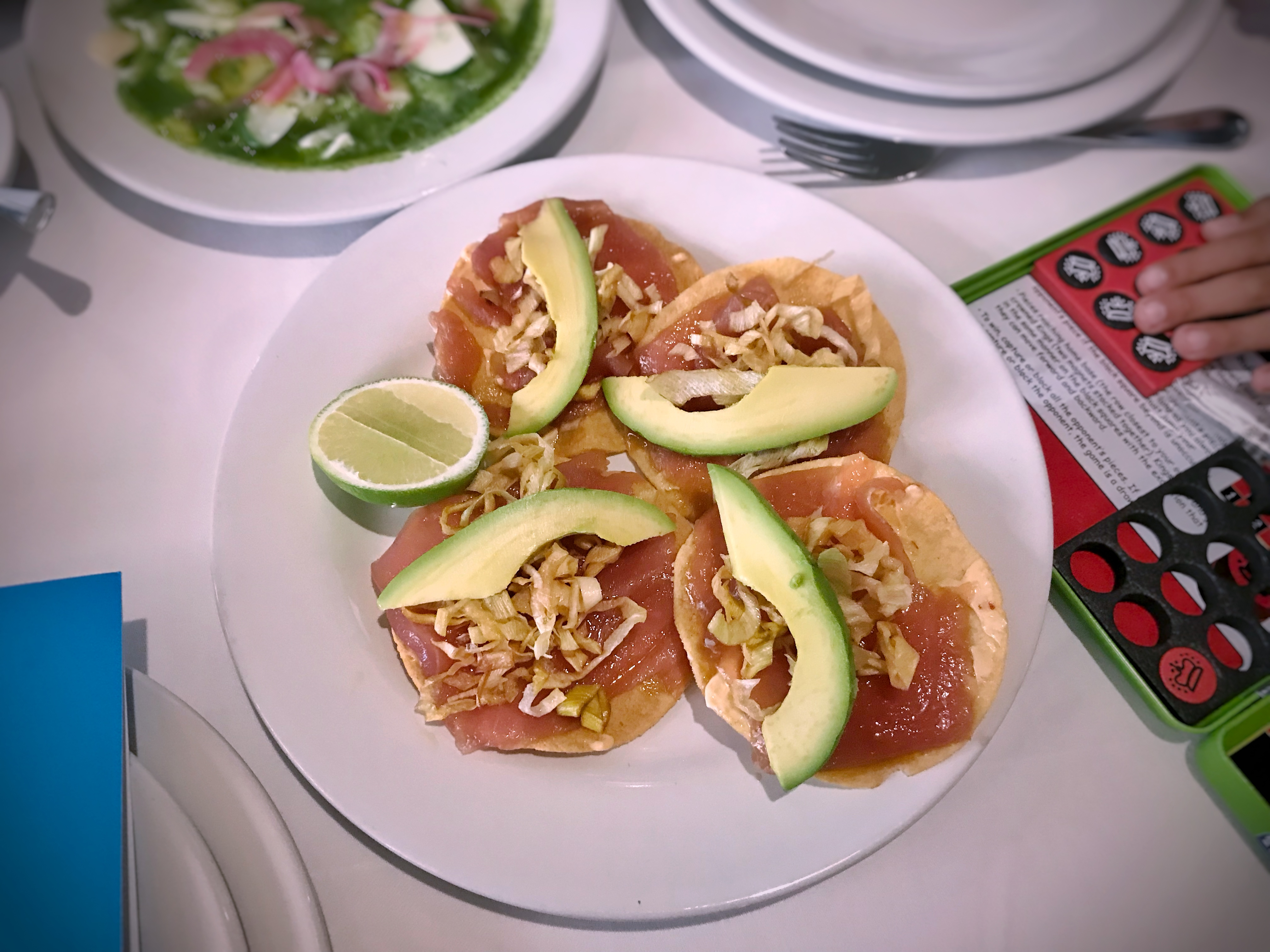
The tuna tostada served at Contramar received praise from food critics

Food critics recommend reservations, noting that the restaurant is often full at lunch, especially on Fridays.

Julia Moskin of The New York Times noted that the dishes are known for their simplicity and refinement, and the restaurant is representative of a family dining experience on a beach vacation. Michael Parker Stainback, writing for Afar, praised the food and service at Contramar, noting that the restaurant is often full. Similarly, Mariana Camacho from The Infatuation added that reservations are often made months in advance due to the restaurant's popularity.

Ana Paula Tovar of El País recommended the meringue with strawberries or fig tart for dessert. A reviewer for Condé Nast Traveler compared the experience to eating at The River Cafe in London, but dressed in a Tulum attire. Writing for Bon Appétit, Scarlett Lindeman described the menu as a healthy dining option in the city.

Critics have praised the tuna tostada, describing it as "well-executed", "iconic", and a "must-try" dish.

Contramar and Cala in San Francisco, both owned by Cámara, are the subject of the 2019 Netflix documentary A Tale of Two Kitchens. Regarding the experience of opening a sister restaurant in the United States, she said: "Opening a Mexican restaurant in the United States is a paradox no matter how you look at it [...] there is a lot of curiosity and respect for authentic Mexican food. On the other hand, there is a larger culture that despises Mexicans".

Contramar received in 2019 the Best Dining Room Service award from the México Gastronómico guide and Best Service in Mexico from Travel + Leisure magazine. In 2023, Contramar was voted the tenth best international restaurant by Food & Wine magazine readers. It received a Bib Gourmand from the Michelin Guide in 2025; the inspectors described the spot as enchanting and recommended the polbo á feira.

== See also ==
- List of Mexican restaurants
- List of Michelin Bib Gourmand restaurants in Mexico
- List of seafood restaurants

== Citations ==
=== Works cited ===
- Armstrong, Kate; Bartlett, Ray; Butler, Stuart; Harrell, Ashley; Hecht, John; Kaminski, Anna; Masters, Tom; Prado, Liza; Richmond, Simon; St Louis, Regis; Tang, Phillip (2022). Lonely Planet Mexico 17. Lonely Planet. ISBN 9781787017160. OCLC 1294684977.
- Bernstein, Nils (June 2013). "Mexico City's Moment". Bon Appétit. Vol. 58, no. 6. ISSN 0006-6990.
- Martineau, Chantal (March 2016). "Your Guide to Mexico City". Sunset. Vol. 236, no. 3. ISSN 0039-5404.
- Flynn, Sean; Hansche, Melanie; Yagoda, Maria (May 2023). "World's Best Restaurants". Food & Wine. Vol. 46, no. 4. ISSN 0741-9015.
- Groen, Danielle (October 2016). "A Novel to Take On". Chatelaine. Vol. 89, no. 10. p. 26. ISSN 0009-1995.
- Helou, Anissa; Guzmán, Pilar; Petrini, Andrea; Needleman, Deborah; Prior, David (October 2017). "Where in the World to Eat". Condé Nast Traveler. Vol. 52, no. 9. ISSN 0893-9683.
- Hill, Kendall (November 2009). "New-Wave Mexico". Gourmet Traveller. Vol. 9, no. 11. ISSN 1034-9006.
- Poblete Ritschel, Claudio (2020). Guía MG México Gastronómico Los 120 restaurantes 2020: Culinaria Mexicana/S. Pellegrino/Nespresso. Larousse Cocina. ISBN 978-6072120570.
- Quine, Oscar (30 January 2017). "Play it cool in Mexico City". Evening Standard. ISSN 1472-5223.
