= History of Colonia Roma =

History of a neighbourhood in Mexico City

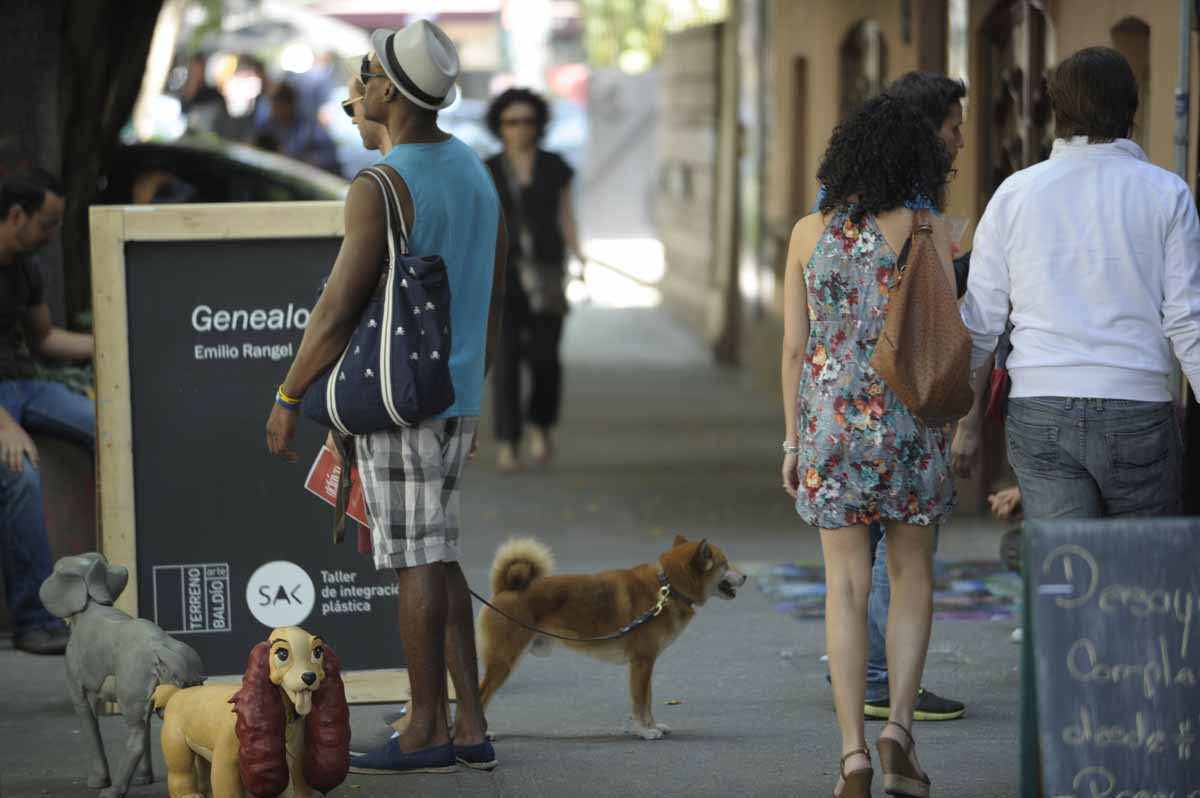
Pedestrians in Roma outside the Galería Terreno Baldío Arte

The history of Colonia Roma, a neighborhood in the Cuauhtémoc borough of Mexico City, runs from a lakeside settlement in Aztec times through its development as an exclusive residential subdivision in the early 20th century. It declined from the 1940s onward, and much of it was destroyed in the 1985 Mexico City earthquake. Since the 1990s it has been the subject of conservation efforts and a cultural revival, and in the 21st century it has drawn growing numbers of tourists and foreign residents and become a focus of debate over gentrification.

== Pre-Hispanic and colonial period ==
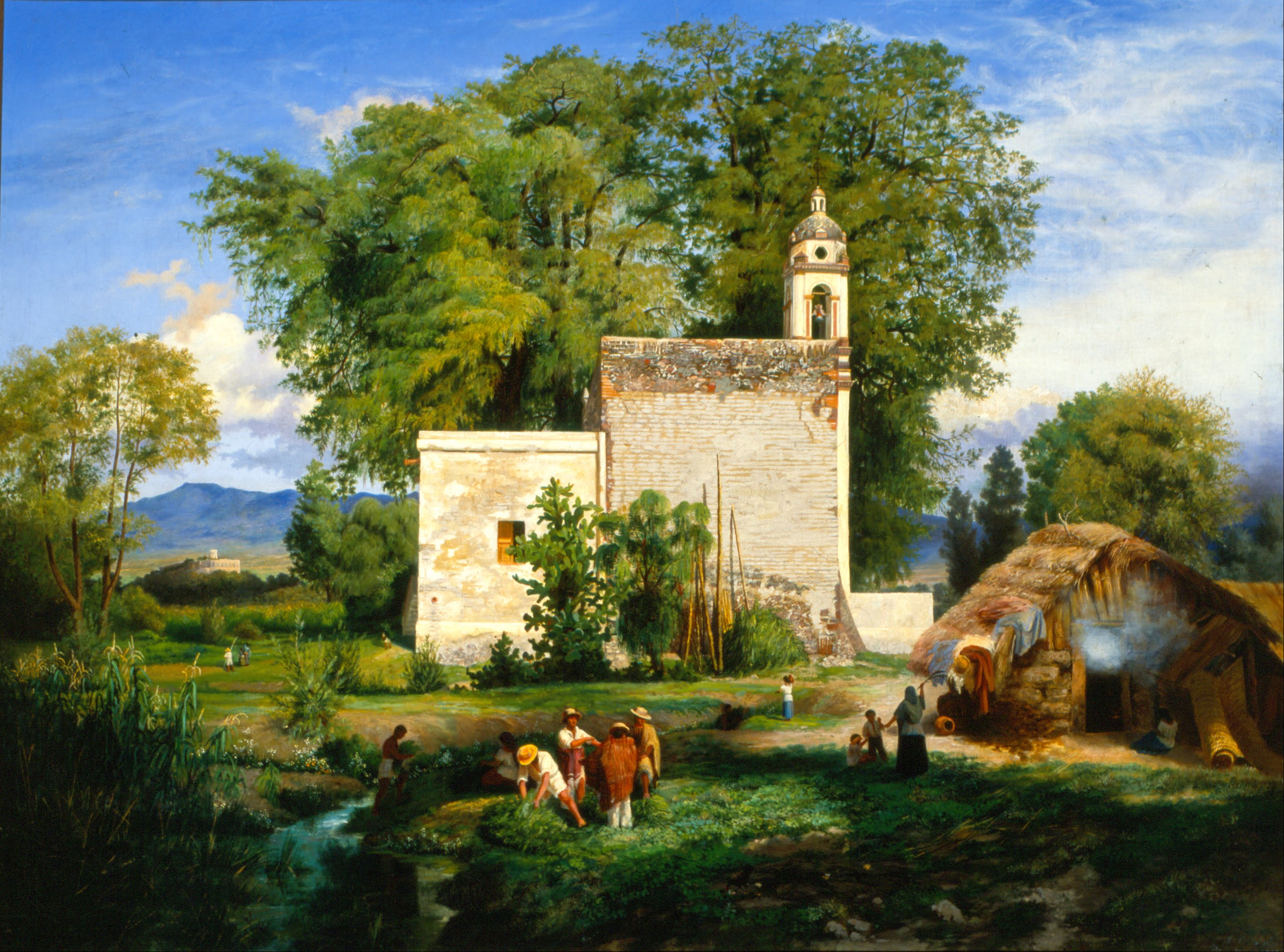
Paisaje de San Cristóbal Romita, Luis Coto, 1857. In the distance on the left can be seen the Chapultepec Castle.

During Aztec times, this area was a shallow lake with a number of very small islands. The Aztecs farmed on chinampas, small artificial islands adjacent to firm land. The repeated creation and sinking of these islands over time extended solid land in the area. The most important settlement was Aztacalco ("house of herons" in Nahuatl), located on one of these islands.

After the Spanish conquest of the Aztec Empire, the area became part of the lands granted to Hernán Cortés by the Spanish Crown in 1529. During much of the colonial period it was part of the property of the Counts of Miravalle. By the early 20th century it belonged to two families named Echegaray and Calero Sierra, and bordered the lands of the Hacienda de la Condesa. Although still rural, it was already bordered by roads such as Avenida Chapultepec and Avenida La Piedad (today Avenida Cuauhtémoc).

== Founding (1902–1910) ==
In the late 19th and early 20th centuries, the mostly dried lakebed west of Mexico City was being developed into "modern" colonias for wealthy residents leaving the deteriorating city center. Aztacalco, then called La Romita or La Romerita, was established as a colonia in 1903. At about the same time, the rest of the land that is now Roma, called Hacienda de Romita or Potreros de Romita, was acquired by an investment group, the Compañía de Terrenos de la Calzada de Chapultepec. The group included British circus owner Edward Walter Orrin, the clown Ricardo Bell, the American engineer Cassius Clay Lamm and his sons, and the Mexican Pedro Lascuráin. Their plan for a residential subdivision was approved by the city government in 1902, under the name Roma rather than Romita.

The government of Porfirio Díaz took part in the project, undertaking to provide roads, water and sewerage; Roma was the first colonia in Mexico City with these services. The colonia was laid out with wide streets, tree-lined medians and boulevards modeled on those of Paris. The streets were named after the Mexican states and cities where the Orrin Circus had performed. The largest was, and still is, Avenida Álvaro Obregón, originally Avenida Jalisco. Small parks such as Plaza Río de Janeiro and Plaza Luis Cabrera were added as green space. These streets and plazas remain, although several of the wider streets, including Álvaro Obregón, Durango, Oaxaca, Querétaro and San Luis Potosí, have since been converted into ejes viales (arterial roads) for through traffic. The project also incorporated the formerly separate La Romita, but its residents resisted and the two communities remained socially separate.

== Revolution and building boom (1910–1940) ==
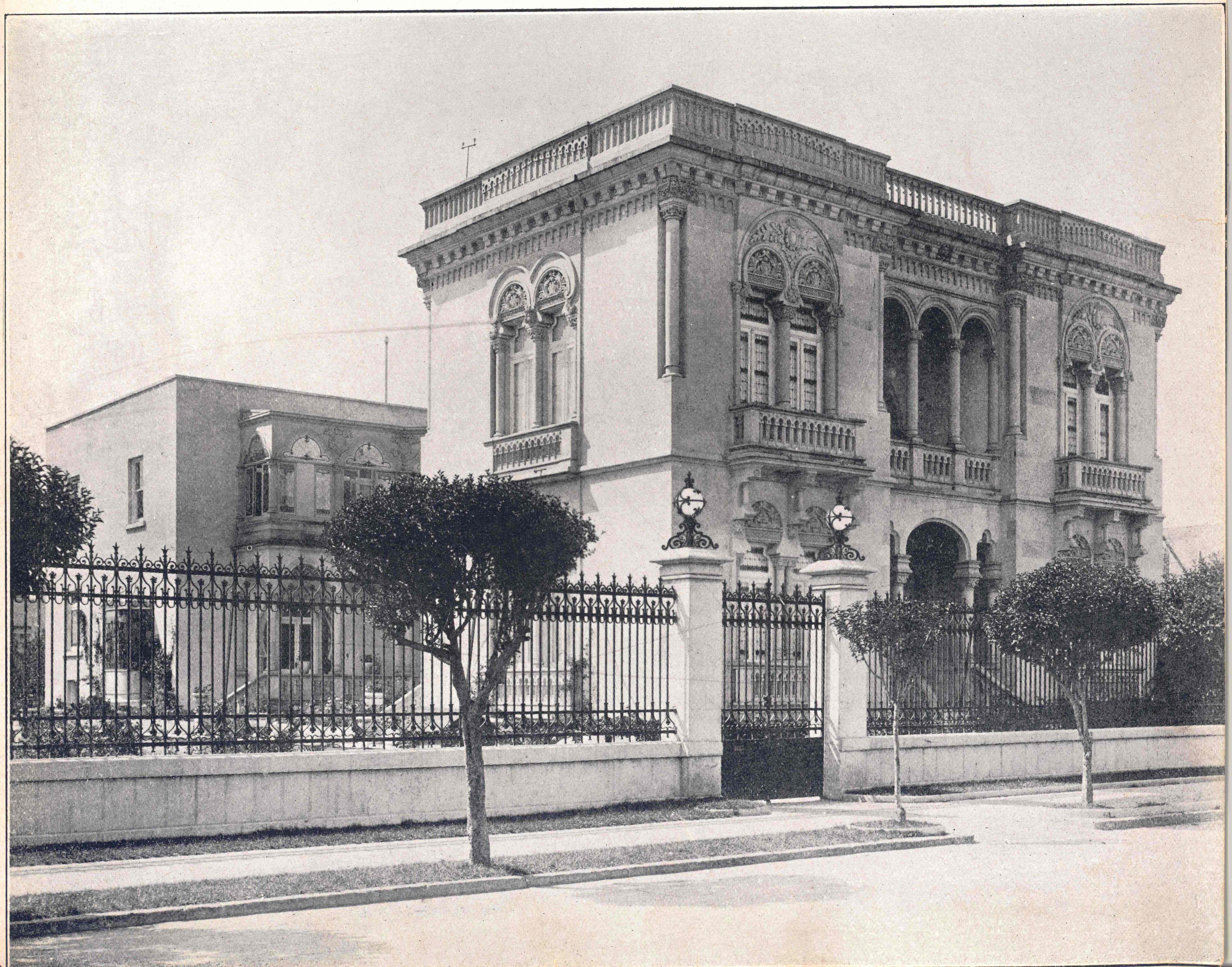
Building at Zacatecas 120, which now houses the Universidad de la Comunicación

After the first infrastructure and some homes were built, the project stalled with the outbreak of the Mexican Revolution in 1910. After the war, Roma and its sister colonias, among them Juárez, Condesa, San Rafael and Santa María la Ribera, had a building boom in the 1920s and 1930s. Their architecture rejected Mexico's traditional Baroque style of red tezontle stone and wrought-iron balconies in favor of a more modern look, heavily influenced by European, especially French, trends and later by Art Deco. According to Ana María Durán Contreras of the Universidad Autónoma Metropolitana, the political class that came to power after the Revolution displaced the Porfirian elite from Roma as well as from government, and building in the colonia picked up again to house the new class.

The colonia was at its most exclusive, regarded as aristocratic and "European", from its founding to the end of the 1930s; its historically and architecturally significant buildings date from between 1906 and 1939. Besides wealthy Mexican families, it attracted foreign residents, from the original British and American developers to French and Spanish families. By the 1930s it had clubs and meeting houses such as La Bandida, where many politicians in the government of Manuel Ávila Camacho met, and bathhouses such as La Torre. Two significant churches were built between 1900 and 1940, but the Cristero War and the religious persecution that went with it led to their closure, and services were held clandestinely in private homes.

== Mid-20th century (1940–1970) ==
In the 1940s and 1950s the area was still exclusive, and it had been home to artists, businessmen and politicians. Residents during the first half of the 20th century included the presidents Álvaro Obregón, Pascual Ortiz Rubio, Luis Echeverría, José López Portillo and Miguel de la Madrid; the writers Ramón López Velarde, Jorge Ibargüengoitia, Fernando Benítez, Juan José Arreola, José Agustín and Pita Amor; the painters David Alfaro Siqueiros and Leonora Carrington; and Julio Sesto, Fernando Solana, Alfonso García Robles, Andrés Palca, María Conesa and Enrique Bátiz. Others included Francisco I. Madero's widow and Concepción Acevedo de la Llata ("Madre Conchita"), who was accused of planning Obregón's assassination.

Even so, families began to move out as newer exclusive districts such as Polanco, Anzures and Lomas de Chapultepec were built farther west. Rents across the city were frozen during the Second World War, initially as a temporary measure, but the freeze was not lifted until the 1990s. The loss of rental income led landlords to neglect maintenance of older buildings over the following decades.

Durán Contreras dates the arrival of commerce and services in Roma to the 1930s, when the growth of the city and its road system led many wealthy residents to leave. Shops and services took over some of the space they left, and their single-family houses were rented out, whole or divided into smaller units, mostly to middle-class tenants. The city's rapid growth in the 1940s increased the building of rental housing in Roma, despite the rent freeze. By the 1950s commerce and especially services were taking up more and more of a colonia that had been almost entirely residential, and its population had begun to fall. The Roma Norte had 69,602 inhabitants in 1950 and 67,291 in 1960.

By the 1950s the colonia was attracting lower-income residents with its low rents. Longtime residents complained about the arrival of Arabs, Jews and migrants from southern states such as Campeche, Chiapas and Tabasco. Some areas became dangerous at night. La Romita, socially segregated, was considered very dangerous, with organized gang activity, by the 1950s, and vagrancy and gangs were also a problem around Plaza Río de Janeiro by the end of the decade.

In the 1960s, older residences began to give way to commercial buildings, especially in Rome Norte. Businesses such as General de Gas, Woolworth, the Mexican Red Cross and Teléfonos de México (Telmex) established premises there. By the end of the decade most of Roma Norte, especially along Avenida Chapultepec, had become commercial. The newer, taller and heavier buildings changed the character of the colonia and also affected the ground around them, damaging neighboring older mansions.

== Decline (1970s–1980s) ==
Serious decline began in the 1970s. More wealthy families left as office buildings went up, and Carlos Hank González's eje road system made the colonia less isolated from the rest of the city and less exclusive. Men's clubs and prostitution appeared. Commercial development destroyed or radically altered many early-20th-century mansions. With little urban planning or zoning in Roma or neighboring colonias, many older homes were converted into offices and shops or razed for office and apartment buildings.

Roma Norte, bounded by Avenida Chapultepec, Avenida Cuauhtémoc, Avenida de los Insurgentes and Antonio M. Anza and Coahuila streets, changed fastest from the 1970s on. Its population fell from 66,208 in 1970 to 39,221 in 1980, a drop of 41% in one decade; the Cuauhtémoc borough as a whole lost 19.7% of its population between 1950 and 1980. The change in land use sped up in 1982. Along Chapultepec, Cuauhtémoc, Álvaro Obregón and Veracruz streets, homes gave way to a mix of housing, shops and especially services, while in the middle and east of the colonia, on San Luis Potosí, Yucatán and Antonio M. Anza streets, more homes took in services. The ground floors of many houses became shops or offices. Puebla Street between Guaymas and Mérida filled with auto-parts shops, and Colima Street between Frontera and Córdoba with florists. Houses on the streets next to the ejes viales and main avenues were mostly used as offices and shops. There were also many abandoned buildings and lots, and some lots were held vacant for speculation.

== 1985 earthquake ==
The deterioration culminated in the 1985 Mexico City earthquake. A geological fault ran southwest to northeast through the colonias of Condesa, Cuauhtémoc, Guerrero, Hipódromo Condesa, Juárez, Maza, Morelos, Peralvillo, Roma Norte and Tabacalera. In Roma alone, 472 buildings partially or completely collapsed, mostly in Roma Norte around Morelia, Mérida, Córdoba, Puebla, Cuauhtémoc, Insurgentes, San Luis Potosí and Chiapas streets. Most were newer buildings, built since the 1950s and many used as low-income housing; the collapses left 15,000 people homeless. The Centro Urbano Benito Juárez, in the southeast corner of the colonia, was mostly destroyed. The destruction was widespread in Roma mainly because much of it stands on soft former lakebed, and because much of the newer construction was taller and less solidly built than the older mansions. Durán Contreras counted 517 damaged buildings in the colonia.

The destruction across the city center created an urgent need for housing. Damaged properties were expropriated and low-income housing was built in haste. Roma, however, was largely left out of the city's main rebuilding program, Renovación Habitacional Popular, which counted 126,450 displaced residents in the colonias where it worked. A study cited by Durán Contreras counted about 321 damaged homes in Roma and about 4,000 residents forced out, who as of 1990 had not been rehoused in the colonia. Only the Fase II housing program, with 159 projects on 9 lots, and the Unión de Vecinos y Damnificados 19 de Septiembre (UVyD, Union of Neighbors and Victims of September 19th) with 110 projects on 5 lots, carried out housing work there; the UVyD worked together with the affected residents and with Mexican and foreign charities. Most of the remaining older and wealthier residents left, and property values fell sharply. The flight of the wealthy also affected neighboring Colonia Condesa, even though it had not suffered significant damage. As of 2005, fifteen inhabited buildings had serious structural faults and were at risk of collapse, and another 700 were considered significantly compromised.

The population of the colonia fell from 95,000 in 1970 to 35,000 in 1995. Between commercialization since the 1960s and the aftermath of the earthquake, Roma lost a large share of its original early-20th-century buildings. Because of their size, most of the old mansions were no longer viable as homes, but their central location and transport links made them valuable for business, pushing owners to alter or demolish them.

== Conservation and revival (1985–2000s) ==
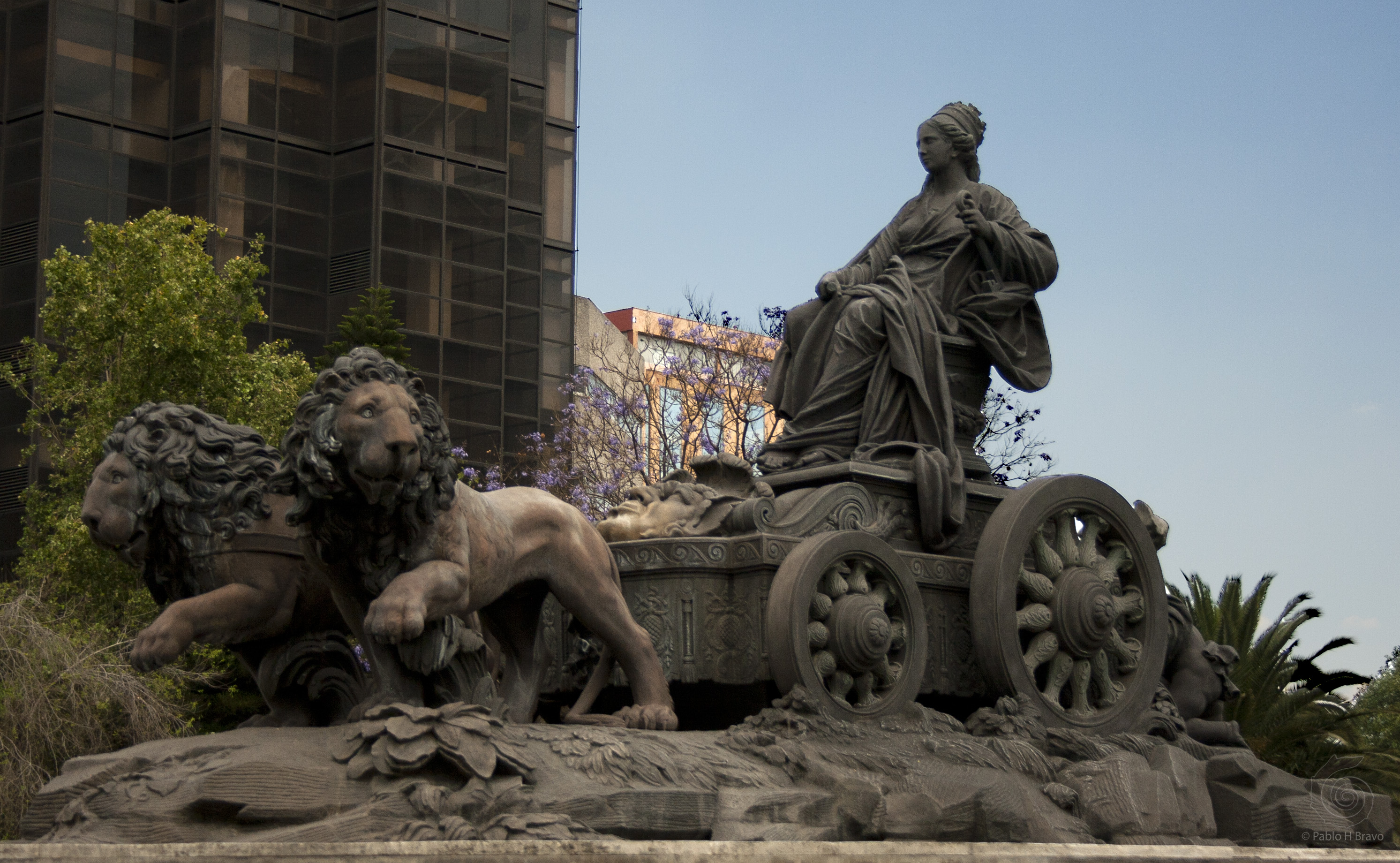
Fuente de Cibeles, a replica of the fountain in Madrid's Plaza de Cibeles, given to the city in 1980 as a token of friendship between the two cities

In the late 1980s there were worries that Roma would keep losing residents. State housing programs were slowing the loss of population in low-income colonias, but not in middle- and upper-income ones such as Juárez, Cuauhtémoc, Condesa and Roma, where housing had been turning into offices and shops since before the earthquake. Durán Contreras warned in 1990 that if this went on unchecked, the colonia would be empty at night and robberies and muggings would increase. She proposed conserving and rehabilitating housing, building social and rental housing, adding cultural and recreational facilities and green space, and encouraging local shops and services, paid for through programs such as Casa Propia and through combined financing from public banks (FONHAPO or FOVI), private developers, private capital and residents.

The earthquake led to stricter building codes and to neighborhood associations dedicated to conserving the colonia's architectural heritage. These groups worked to stop tall apartment and office buildings and to preserve the remaining early-20th-century mansions. They succeeded in having the city attorney general's office relocated in the mid-1990s and in blocking an underground car park beneath the Plaza de Cibeles. As of 1996, no new apartment buildings had been built since 1990, although some older buildings had been converted to apartments.

Rents hit bottom after 1985, attracting artists and hipsters, many of whom restored old mansions as offices and businesses while keeping their original façades. In 1988 the city decided to restore the La Romita area, especially its church, Santa María de la Natividad de Aztacalco. As of 1996, 1,100 early-20th-century mansions survived, though restoration had mixed success: the government neglected road maintenance, and private investment in restoring, converting and reselling buildings was patchy. The best-preserved mansions were along Colima, Tonalá and Álvaro Obregón streets and Avenida Chapultepec. From the 1990s a number of art galleries opened, especially on Colima Street, many of them following the establishment of the Casa Lamm Cultural Center.

By the mid-1990s much of the colonia had been zoned for mixed residential and office use, with the older mansions promoted as commercial and cultural space, and traffic had been routed around much of the area to discourage residents from leaving. Since 2002 there have been efforts to formally designate and catalogue the historically and architecturally significant buildings so that they can be given more protection.

== 21st century ==
=== 2017 earthquake ===
In the 2017 Puebla earthquake on September 19, 2017, the office building at Álvaro Obregón 286 collapsed, killing 49 people.

=== Tourism ===
MercadoRoma, which opened on Querétaro Street in 2014, was billed as the city's first gourmet market, and Elena Reygadas's Rosetta, on Colima Street, holds a Michelin star.

The success of Roma brought visitors to Tepeji Street, where Cuarón's childhood home stands at number 21; the house across the street at number 22, where the film was shot, carries a plaque reading "Aquí se filmó Roma" ("Roma was filmed here"). Residents reported people from across Mexico and from abroad knocking on their doors to ask about the shoot.

One of the colonia's early mansions, on Orizaba Street, reopened in February 2020 as the luxury Brick Hotel. The house had been built during the Porfiriato for William Newbold, director of the Banco de Londres y México, and was bought in 1919 by Álvaro Obregón, who was assassinated before he could live there. It later served as a well-known brothel in the 1930s and 1940s and, from the 1960s, as a locksmith's shop before being abandoned.

=== Remote workers and gentrification ===
From 2020, during the COVID-19 pandemic, large numbers of foreigners, especially Americans working remotely, moved to Mexico City, drawn by lower costs and fewer restrictions; the number of Americans living in Mexico rose by 70% between 2019 and 2022. In 2022 the city government, under then-mayor Claudia Sheinbaum, signed an agreement with Airbnb and UNESCO to promote the city to digital nomads. Short-term rentals became concentrated in the area: by 2024 Roma Norte had 2,571 Airbnb listings, more than any other colonia in the city, and Roma Sur had 812. In October 2024 the city's Congress limited online vacation rentals to 180 days a year.

On July 4, 2025, hundreds of people marched against gentrification from Parque México in Condesa through Condesa and Roma to the Angel of Independence, with slogans such as "Gentrification is not progress, it's dispossession". A small group vandalized businesses; borough authorities counted 14 damaged and 40 more covered in graffiti, and an employee of a café in Roma Norte was injured. President Sheinbaum called the anti-foreigner displays xenophobic while acknowledging gentrification as a real problem, and Mayor Clara Brugada's government condemned the violence and promised housing measures to help long-time residents stay in their neighborhoods.

== In literature and film ==
The American writer William S. Burroughs lived in Roma in the early 1950s, on what is now José Alvarado Street (then Cerrada de Medellín). On September 6, 1951, he fatally shot his wife, Joan Vollmer, at an apartment at Monterrey 122 in the colonia. Jack Kerouac's novella Tristessa was inspired by a walk through Plaza Luis Cabrera, and his poem "Cerrada de Medellín Blues" by the street where Burroughs lived.

José Emilio Pacheco's novella Las batallas en el desierto, first published in 1980 in the Sábado supplement of Unomásuno and as a book by Ediciones Era in 1981, is set in Colonia Roma around 1948, during the presidency of Miguel Alemán.

Alfonso Cuarón's 2018 film Roma, set in 1970–71, drew largely on his childhood in the neighborhood.
