= Jan Ziff =

British journalist and author (1953–2022)

- Born: 1 December 1953; Leeds, England
- Died: 5 February 2022 (aged 68)
- Education: University College London
- Occupations: Journalist; children's writer
- Employer: Voice of America; BBC World Service
- Spouse: Allan Davidson
- Mother: Ann Rachlin
- Relatives: Trisha Ziff (sister)

Jan Ziff (1 December 1953 – 5 February 2022) was a British journalist and children's writer. After working in Israel as a journalist for Voice of America and BBC World Service, she became the latter's first correspondent for the United States Department of State. She later worked on children's fiction, including a book series called Heckerty Spells.

== Biography ==
=== Early life and career ===
Susan Janet Ziff was born on 1 December 1953 in Leeds, the first-born child of Barratts Shoes director Neville Ziff and musician and author Ann Rachlin. According to The Times, she "was a precocious child who could read fluently at the age of three and became a keen participant in amateur dramatics." She was educated at Cheltenham Ladies' College and University College London, where she read Middle Eastern studies.

After moving to Jerusalem for her master's studies, she gained an interest in journalism. She started her journalism career at Voice of America (where she was head of the Jerusalem bureau) and BBC World Service (where she was a Gaza and West Bank correspondent).

=== United States Department of State correspondent and later career ===
In 1987, the BBC hired Ziff as their first correspondent for the United States Department of State, and she moved to Washington, D.C. Her work included the Madrid Conference of 1991, where she interviewed Yasser Arafat and King Hussein of Jordan, and routinely traveling Air Force One alongside four Secretaries of State, and she became particularly close to James Baker. Her "James Baker World Tour" shirt, which she based on a T-shirt she had of Paul McCartney and named every country Baker had visited as Secretary of State before ending in "to be continued", was praised as "the hottest Washington fashion craze" by The Washington Post. During her time in D.C., she rebuked the Senate's excessive interest in the diary that led to Bob Packwood's resignation given "all the other more serious issues America faced at home and abroad". In 1994, she parted ways with the BBC. She hosted the CBS News Radio programme Sound Bytes and worked as public relations adviser for American businessman John Sculley.

Ziff wrote a series of children's books called Heckerty Spells, about a witch named Heckerty and her cat Zanzibar, working with both her mother and husband. She and her husband co-authored The World of Children's Picture Books, a trilogy of books on children's stories adapted from a Chinese publishing industry catalogue. She ran two companies: The Heckerty Company, a publishing house where she "combined her skills as a children's storyteller with her experience as a foreign correspondent" and even partnered with the China Children's Press & Publication Group; and Broomstick Productions, an educational technology company specializing in books and apps where she often used the Heckerty character. Ziff often voiced Heckerty in the Heckerty audiobooks.

Ziff once organized efforts to stop a planned copper mine on Apache land, working at the San Carlos Apache Indian Reservation's chair office as executive director. She also designed jewellery and knitted as a hobby, and rescued several dogs, becoming interested in border collies.

=== Personal life and death ===
Ziff married Allan Davidson, a Canadian-born radio producer and publisher. In 1992, the couple often used CompuServe technology to communicate with each other even when they were on different continents, preferring it to telephones due to costs. The two once lived in Shaw House, a flat complex in Mayfair, before she moved to Phoenix. Her sister is filmmaker Trisha Ziff. In addition to English, Ziff spoke Hebrew, Arabic, French, Russian, and Spanish.

Ziff died of cancer on 5 February 2022; she was 68.
