= Nota roja =

Mexican journalism genre

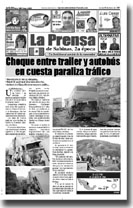
Front page of La Prensa with story about an accident

Nota roja (lit. “red note” or “red news”) is a journalism genre popular in Mexico. While similar to more general sensationalist or yellow journalism, the nota roja focuses almost exclusively on stories related to physical violence related to crime, accidents and natural disasters. The origin of the name is most likely related to the Mexican Inquisition, where a red stamp was placed on orders for execution or other punishments. By the 19th century, the term came to be used for violent crime, especially murder. With the development of the newspaper industry in that century, news of this type developed long, very detailed stories, which might have a graphic image to artistically depict the event. Both were meant to provoke emotion and sensationalism. The need to provoke emotion in the stories continued into the 20th century, but the introduction of photography in journalism changed both the illustration and text of the stories, with photographs, especially gory ones, dominating nota roja pages and text diminishing to bare facts and violent words. Today, entire newspapers are devoted to nota roja stories and have infiltrated television as well. The genre has also influenced writing and cinema in Mexico as well as prompted criticisms that it promotes and commercializes violence.

== Definition ==
Nota roja literally means “red note” or “red news”. It is a type of sensational journalism or yellow journalism, defined by its focus exclusively on stories involving physical violence usually occasioned by robbery, murder, tragic accidents, imprisonment and executions. However, natural disasters can also be covered. News of this type can be found as single sheet announcements, sections of newspapers, entire newspapers and magazines and television.

News stories of this type target the lower social classes, mostly in Mexico and other parts of Latin America. Nota roja focuses on the physical and emotional toll of events, combining graphic images and sensationalist narration, with photography far more graphic than what is shown in the media in the U.S. and various other countries. Images in these photos have included severed heads on nightclub dance floors, people run over by cars, bodies floating in rivers and drains, human bones on farms and in ravines and people ritually tortured by Satanists or drug cartels. Text and headlines are crude and show little concern for the privacy of people being depicted. Headlines are written to grab attention, and often have elements of exaggeration and melodrama, printed simply in bright or contrasting colors. The narration of modern nota roja is simple, brief and without commentary on the meaning of the event.

== History ==
=== Origins ===
The origin of this kind of news has been linked to the tecpuyutl (Aztec town criers for the nobility) as well as the cordel literature of 16th century Spain. But the name is most likely linked to the Mexican Inquisition. Inquisitors handed out brutal and often public punishments. Announcements and decrees of such were posted publicly on streets and plazas of New Spain as well, having red seals (notas rojas) to indicate the approval of ecclesiastical authorities.

=== 19th century ===
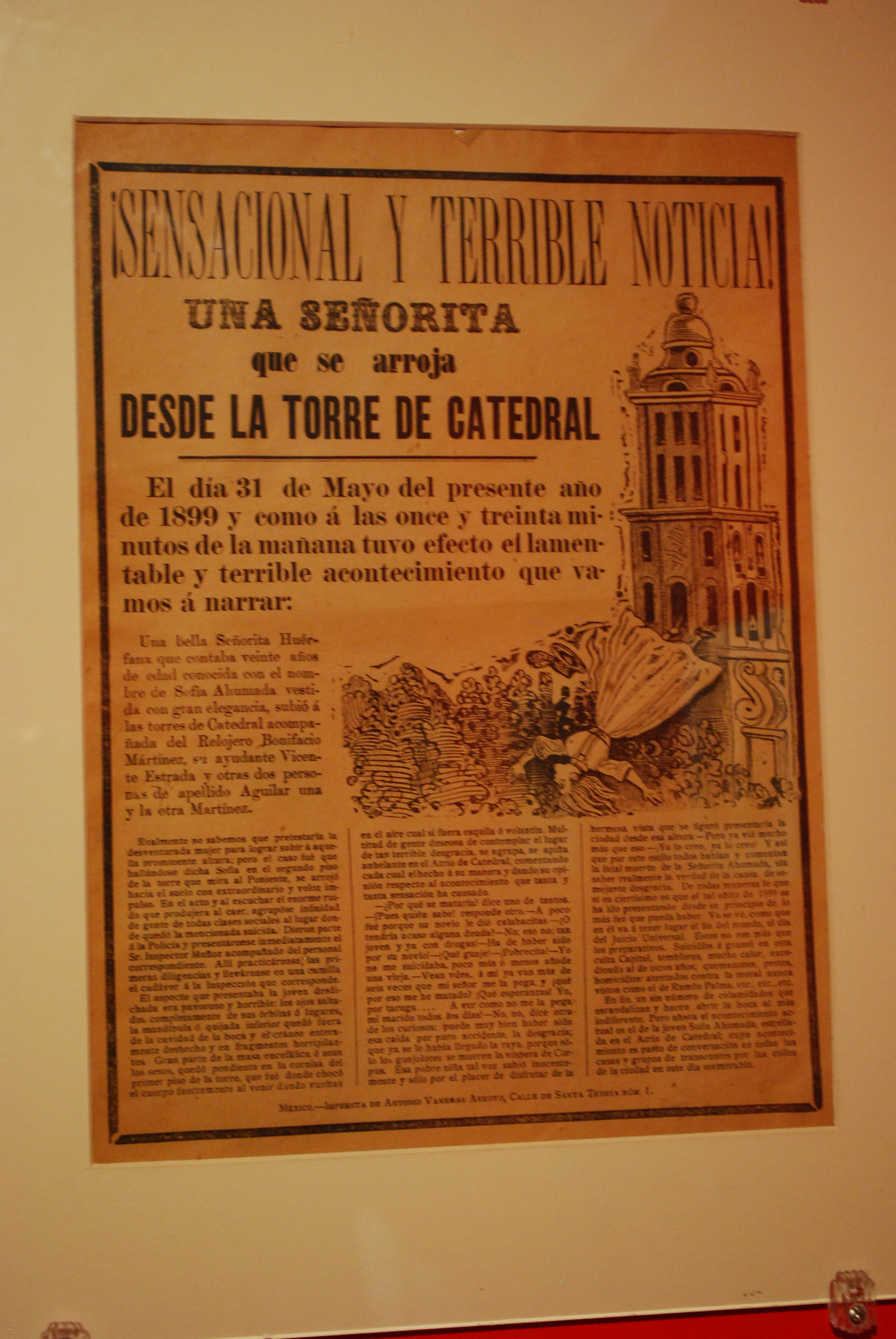
Nota roja sheet with illustration by José Guadalupe Posada

By the 19th century, the term “nota roja” came to refer to violent crimes, especially murders by the beginning of the 19th century. According to legend, one Guadalajara newspaper began printing headlines of these stories in red in 1889 in order to indicate that the story was about a murder and provoke horror in potential readers.

The development of commercial newspapers in the 19th century gave rise to sections dedicated to violent stories, a common occurrence for Mexico in the midst of various wars and political instability along with crime. These stories developed into long texts with dramatized narration with minute and graphic descriptions along with a psychological profile of the aggressor. The more sensational stories were accompanied by a hand-drawn graphic image. The purpose of the image was not to give an absolutely accurate depiction of the event or its aftermath, but rather to give a more artistic interpretation of what happened, conveying a sense of tragedy, generally in the form of line images. The reader was invited to imagine the rest of the scene, and the images also strived to conform with social mores, such as those related to female modesty.

One famous single sheet nota roja was published in 1899 by Antonio Vanegas Arroyo, sold on the streets with cries of “¡Sensacional y terrible noticia! ¡Una señorita que se arroja desde la torre de la catedral!” (Sensational and terrible news! A young woman who has thrown herself from the tower of the cathedral!) The image in this sheet is attributed to José Guadalupe Posada. The image shows a woman falling from the tower, but her dress is arranged as it would be normally, not as it would be from the physics of falling.

=== 20th century to the present ===
The first photographs appeared newspapers in Mexico around 1900 and changed how nota roja stories were illustrated. Due to its nature, photographic images are more realistic and less interpretive, tending to confront the viewer with the violence of the scene. Before the advent of cameras in cell phone, photography was mostly limited to the aftermath of events, when the reporters could get to the scene. Nonetheless, the graphic nature of the images photographs provide spurred an appetite for such images. Originally photography of scenes did try to create some dramatization in the use of light, angles etc. (the photography of Enrique Metinides is a good example of this) but from the 1940s to the 1960s, the focus of the photography leaned towards graphic and bloody images.

In the latter 20th century, the demand for graphic and savage images and stories transformed how nota roja stories were presented. Photographs now dominate this kind of news, generally using the images with the most blood and gore with no other emotion to evoke but sensationalism. Text has been shorted to the minimum and even headlines are constructed to focus on the violence. By the 1960s, the nota roja was generally characterized by the use of enclitic pronouns, which shifted focus onto the verbs. One example of this is from “Alarma”; an archetypical nota roja magazine" “Raptola, violola y matola” (Kidnapped her, raped her and killed her). By the 1970s, most of the reported crimes in these sections are those of passion.

By the 1970s, entire newspapers were devoted to nothing more than nota roja stories, including Alarma and La Prensa, which became extremely popular and even sold in the United States. Modern nota roja stories still focus on blood and gore, but they have also moved into stories related to organized crime, especially drug trafficking.

By the 1990s, the nota roja genre had moved into television. The antecedent of this kind of television is a show called Mujer, Caso de la Vida Real, which has been on the air over ten years and mostly deals with domestic issues and violence. The first shows of this kind were Hard Copy and Ocurrió Así, both produced in the United States, but they have been followed by Primer Impacto, A Sangre Fría, Detrás del Video, Expediente, Cámara y Delito and Ciudad Desnuda. These have become part of the popular culture and have attracted the attention of public officials, who have accused these shows of promoting and commercializing violence, making it seem more common than it is.

== Influence ==
Although nota roja journalism is looked upon with disfavor, it is immensely popular and has influence over its readers, as it reflects the state of society in its reporting. Many papers carry at least some element of nota roja as it is necessary for market presence.

Nota roja has had influence in Mexican arts and literature. Writer Jorge Ibargüengoitia that he read the nota roja frequently as he felt that they reflected the morality of the times in a most direct way, and featured common people who normally did not appear in the newspaper. Nota roja has also provided inspiration to novelists and other writers, such as Nicaraguan Sergio Ramírez, using the stories to explore the human condition in the modern world. (eahernandez) Carlos Monsiváis stated that the nota roja converted “the most notorious crimes into an artistic expression and adult fairy tales are seen in acts of blood.” It has influenced Mexican cinema, especially after 1950, when film making became more commercialized. Evidence of this include the creation of start images of violence, often in areas that indicate human degradation.

The genre has been heavily criticized, especially by politicians who accuse it of making violent crime, especially that related to the drug trade, worse than it is, and newspaper have been asked to tone down such coverage. However, a study done in Puebla that while most read the nota roja out of morbid curiosity, most stated that it primarily invoked feelings of sadness, disgust or anger, rather than a desire to imitate what they saw.

== Nota Roja journalists ==
One notable writer of nota roja is Eduardo Monteverde, who has not only written such stories for newspapers in Mexico, but has also based novels and other writings on it. Since beginning his career in 1969, he has covered more than 500 cases in over twenty five years for La Prensa and El Financiero.

Enrique Metinides is a notable photographer of the nota roja, whose career spanned about fifty years, beginning as an unpaid assistant when he was only 13. He began by taking photographs of car crashes in front of his father's business in the San Cosme neighborhood of Mexico City and continued by working most for La Prensa until his retirement. More recently, his work has been appreciated for its own merits and artistic value being exhibited in Mexico, the United States and Europe.
