= The Mexican Suitcase =

2007 documentary

- DVD cover
- Directed by: Trisha Ziff
- Written by: Trisha Ziff
- Produced by: Trisha Ziff, Eamon O'Farrill, Paco Poch
- Cinematography: Claudio Rocha
- Edited by: Bernat Aragonés, Luis Lopez, Paloma López
- Production companies: 212 Berlin, Mallerich Films, Alicorn Films
- Release date: July 9, 2011 (Karlovy Vary)
- Countries: Mexico, Spain, United States
- Languages: English, Spanish

The Mexican Suitcase is a 2011 documentary film directed by Trisha Ziff. It tells the story of over 4000 film negatives created during the Spanish Civil War by photographers David Seymour, Gerda Taro, and Robert Capa. The film follows the journey of the photographs from their disappearance at the beginning of World War II to their rediscovery in 2007. Interviews also cover political and personal stories from the era. According to Documentary magazine:

The Mexican Suitcase brings together three narratives: the suitcase, the exile story and how people in Spain today address their own past, 30 years after transition. The Mexican Suitcase addresses the power of memory, and asks, “Who owns our histories?”

Time wrote, "Ziff weaves in personal, often painful accounts of biographies of those who had survived the war by fleeing Spain, many unable to forget even to this day."

Film Journal International said, “…for even the most casual students of photography, journalism and history, this beautiful and soulful film is nevertheless required viewing.”

The film was invited by the International Documentary Association to qualify for Academy Awards consideration by participating in DocuWeeks 2011, where it was called "fascinating on multiple levels."
