= Chevolution =

2008 documentary film

Chevolution is a 2008 documentary film which examines the history and legacy of the photo Guerrillero Heroico taken by famous Cuban photographer Alberto Díaz Gutiérrez. This image has thrived for the decades since Che Guevara's death and has evolved into an iconic image, which represents a multitude of ideals. The documentary explores the story of how the photo came to be, its adoption of multiple interpretations and meanings, as well as the commercialization of the image of Ernesto "Che" Guevara.

Chevolution uses historic images and a multitude of artists, musicians, photographers, actors, academics, friends, fans, and acquaintances to explore the contrasting themes of "communism and capitalism, idealism and opportunism, art and commerce and how they have interacted and operated on the same materials during the past half century."

== The photographer ==
In the documentary Chevolution, Alberto Díaz Gutiérrez is an essential character in the creation and reproduction of Che as an icon. Alberto Korda was a well-known Cuban fashion photographer and socialite. The documentary explains how after capturing a powerful image of a poor infant Cuban girl, which he titled La Niña, he decided to leave the fashion world and use his photographic talent to promote and document the Cuban Revolution. Korda began taking pictures for the propaganda newspaper Revolución. The documentary also provides an anecdote about Korda asking Che if he could take his picture, Guevara responded by asking Korda where he was from and if he had ever cut sugar. Korda informed him that he was from Havana and had never cut sugar. Guevara stipulated that once Korda had cut sugar cane for a week, he would be free to take Guevara's picture.

== The photo ==
Chevolution commemorates when Korda snapped the photo at the massive funeral in the Plaza de Revolución for those who had died in the bombing of a boat carrying weapons from Belgium, La Coubre, in Havana Harbor. Korda was fortunate to have captured two photos of Guevara that day and after submitting them, the newspaper chose not to use them. One of the two photos included the Guerillero Heroico. Living in communist Cuba, copyright laws were non-existent so Korda initially obtained no rights to the portrait.

== Evolution of image ==
Chevolution explains how the politically radical, outspoken, and self-proclaimed communist Giangiacomo Feltrinelli was the first to mass-produce the photo by producing hundreds of thousands of posters of the image. Feltrinelli printed these posters with “copyright Feltrinelli 1976” in the bottom left hand corner giving no credit to Korda. This has caused some controversy as some, including Korda, claim that Feltrinelli made a lot of money from the image while others contest that this is simply not true.

The documentary also emphasizes that it is unclear exactly when the first time the image was used. The photo gained widespread notoriety after Guevara's death in Bolivia. Critics in the documentary claim that at Guevara's funeral Fidel Castro used the image on a banner, which served as a backdrop as he delivered Guevara's eulogy. Throughout the late 1960s, worldwide student movements, and the Civil Rights Movement in the United States utilized the image as a symbol of struggle, rebellion and revolution. Chevolution describes the moments in which after a visit with Jean-Paul Sartre, Korda gave the French philosopher a copy of the photograph; Sartre in turn gave it to artist Jim Fitzpatrick. In the documentary Fitzpatrick shares that after hearing the story of Guevara's murder he was devastated and very sad. He then decided to add his artistic touch to the image in an effort to ensure that Guevara's legacy lived on. In a style known as pop art, he set the black and white portrait of Guevara against a red backdrop with a gold star on his beret. Fitzpatrick purposely chose not to copyright the image, as he states that he wanted it to "breed like rabbits" The documentary describes how by the 1990s the image had evolved from one used as a form of protest to one used to make a profit. Korda felt that he too should share in the profit of the photo and hired lawyers to attain the copyright image. While Korda did not want to keep people from using it all together, he did want to limit what kinds of messages and products the image was used in an effort to keep the image from being used for commercial or inappropriate purposes.

== Production ==
Luis Lopez and Trisha Ziff directed Chevolution, a documentary that honors the longevity of Che Guevara's photo taken by Alberto Korda. It was released in theaters on 1 April 2008 and released on DVD on 19 January 2010. It has a running time of 1 hour and 26 minutes. The film provides commentary from a variety of perspectives including: actors Antonio Banderas and Gael García Bernal, the author of "Che Guevara a revolutionary life" Jon Lee Anderson, the American rock band Rage Against the Machine guitarist Tom Morello, photographers Jose Figueroa and Laborio Naval, artists Shepard Fairey and Jim Fitzpatrick, and long-time friend Alberto Granado.

== Representation ==
In the Chevolution documentary the image of Che Guevara is demonstrated as one that has survivability and has had presence throughout historic events such as social movements and demonstrations. The image of Che conveys different meanings depending on the people, where and at what period in time is being used. He represents people involved in movements who are empowered by him. The Zapatistas for instance, continue to harvest the seed that Che left instill in them and continues to have meaning. Che is the ultimate icon for rebels. Chevolution examines the importance of interpretation of the famous and mass-produced image of Che Guevara, which his due to the lack of copyright. The lack of copyright is also argued to reflect the ideals of Che in regards to capitalism. Che, as discussed in the documentary, represents the people and their struggle. Che has been adopted in social and political struggles. The image has taken on many different meanings through its multitude of representations.

== Commercialization ==
The Che image and idealization continues to carry powerful meaning and is mass-produced with various interpretations that evolve over time. In the documentary Chevolution the image is described as a symbol that represents something unique to each individual and cause. The documentary describes how its multiple meanings and interpretations are displayed through the different forms of art and commercialization of the portrait. Through various art forms it has been and continues to be modified and reconstructed to have different meaning or manipulate its representation. Commercialization of the image has expanded to pictures, swimming suits, beer, wallets, socks, shirts, cigarettes, even in cartoons such as South Park and The Simpsons. The commercialization of Che in all forms has contributed to the recognition and persistence of the icon. Che was a devout Marxist who rejected the corporate model and capitalism. Chevolution also discusses how capitalist society has overtaken the Che image and whether or not it reflects his ideologies.

== Che tattoo ==
In the documentary a young Cuban man is captured being tattooed with the face of Che on his arm. He says that as Cubans they are told stories and constantly talked about Che in school at an early age, which gave him the childhood inspiration to get a Che tattoo. Che serves as an icon that represents the struggle of the Cuban people and a heroic freedom fighter. The documentary also illustrates how the image of Che reflects heroism to Cubans and how it is intertwined with Cubanness.

== Comparing Che with Christ ==
Chevolution also discusses the interpretation of Che's death and the images that showed him lying dead on a piece of cement in Bolivia. The interpretation was the comparison of Che with Jesus Christ. As dramatic as it is, the documentary discusses how this comparison happened immediately after images of a lifeless Che were released. Che repeatedly claimed his solidarity with the people's struggle and believed in victory by any means possible. The documentary also compares the cause of Jesus' death and comments on the idea of collective guilt felt amongst many as Che died for people's freedom. Chevolution talks about Che's image as a sacred icon in Bolivia and how Bolivians revere him as a saint. The documentary highlights the significance in recognizing the interpretation of Che in Vallagrande, Bolivia. In Bolivia people refer and pray to Saint Ernesto de la Higuera, although the Catholic Church does not recognize Ernesto Che Guevara as a Saint. Che has also been seen as a representation of Christ. Che's beret is interpreted as his crown of thorns, which becomes Che's crown of thoughts. The documentary shows Armando Krieger, an Argentine composer who plays a piano piece meanwhile there is a female singing in an angelical voice in words that praise Che. This religious aspect of society reflects the power of Che, his ideals, image, and the hope he provided the poor and less fortunate.

== Political icon ==
Chevolution also discusses the usage of Che's image by Rage Against the Machine on the 1992 single, "Bombtrack". In Chevolution, Tom Morello, guitarist of the band, explains how the use of Che's image on instruments on stage represents a 5th member. Che represents the bands political ideas and is used in a radical context. Morello also says to believe that Che's image is a public domain piece and people as a whole own the image. Che represented and still represents poor, powerless and marginalized people who want freedom and their human rights to be respected. Che's ideals did not die when he died, they live on through his image. Shepard Fairey a well-known artist contributes to the documentary by stating that the image of Che has become an important aspect of pop culture and culture creation. Shepard talks about his own recreation or exploitation as he refers to his interpretation of the image. Participating and commenting on this specific politically influential image Fairey explains that his reproduction of the image conveys the continuing revolutionary message that Che represents. He also talks about his work within the capitalist system and emphasized on the consumption of Che's followers and how his creation adds to the many others that exist. The many different forms of admiration for Che have contributed to his legacy and in this case the documentary provides a vast array of songs dedicated to Che. Throughout the documentary the following songs are played, "El Che 2007” by Armando Krieger and performed by Roberto Falcon, "Che Guevara T-shirt Wearer" by Luke Hoskins and performed by The Clap, "Hasta Siempre" by Carlos Manuel Puebla and performed by Boikot.
