= The Man Who Saw Too Much =

- Theatrical release poster
- Directed by: Trisha Ziff
- Written by: Trisha Ziff
- Produced by: Trisha Ziff; Alan Suárez
- Starring: Enrique Metinides
- Cinematography: Felipe Perez-Burchard
- Edited by: Pedro G. García
- Music by: Rodrigo Garibay
- Production companies: 212 Berlin Films; Wabi Productions; Arte Mecánica Producciones
- Release dates: October 2015 (MIFF); June 16, 2017 (Mexico)
- Running time: 89 minutes
- Country: Mexico
- Language: Spanish

The Man Who Saw Too Much (Spanish: El hombre que vio demasiado) is a 2015 Mexican documentary film written, directed and co-produced by Trisha Ziff. It explores the life and work of Enrique Metinides, one of the great sensationalist photographers of the 20th century, characterized by portraying scenes of murders, crashes, accidents, suicides, fires, and disasters in Mexico City. It won the Ariel Award for Best Documentary Feature and Best Original Score at the 58th Ariel Awards.

== Synopsis ==
When an accident occurs, all the people run to browse, the bigger and more spectacular the incident, the greater the number of people, as the photos of Enrique Metinides show. This documentary will delve into the life and work of this photojournalist, thanks to family testimonies and former colleagues we will discover what Metinides' working life was like, portraying traffic accidents, corpses, murderers, severed bodies, tragedies such as explosions, fires, going through the earthquake from 1985 with the iconic photograph of the collapsed Regis Hotel, but also his human side of how he helped injured children into ambulances.

== Release ==
The Man Who Saw Too Much had its world premiere in mid-October 2015 at the Morelia International Film Festival. It had its commercial premiere on June 16, 2017, in Mexican theaters.

== Reception ==
=== Critical reception ===
On the review aggregator website Rotten Tomatoes, 89% of 9 critics' reviews are positive, with an average rating of 7.0/10.

James Young from Variety points out that the documentary adequately delves into the story of Enrique Metinides, although sometimes it runs out of references or visual material, it manages to remain relentless and serene to show the universe of artisanal and photographic pain. Arturo Magaña from Cine Premiere calls this film a fantastic story that deserves to be seen and that is capable of building a character whose journalistic and photographic work was recognized, becoming a sample of the Mexican idiosyncrasy.

=== Accolades ===
Year	Award	Category	Recipient	Result	Ref.
2015	Morelia International Film Festival	Press Warrior Award	Trisha Ziff	Won	
2016	Ibero-American Documentary Memory Festival	Best Ibero-American Documentary	Trisha Ziff	Won	
2016	Monterrey International Film Festival	Best Mexican Feature Film Documentary	Trisha Ziff	Won	
2016	Ariel Award	Best Documentary Feature	Trisha Ziff	Won	
2016	Ariel Award	Best Original Score	Jacobo Lieberman	Won	
2017	Canacine Awards	Best Director	Trisha Ziff	Nominated	
2017	Canacine Awards	Best Documentary Feature	Trisha Ziff	Won	
