= Alicia Gironella De'Angeli =

Mexican chef (1931–2024)

Alicia Gironella
- Born: Alicia Gironella De'Angeli; 18 January 1931; Mexico City, Mexico
- Died: 1 February 2024 (aged 93)
- Years active: 1950s–2020s
- Employer(s): El Tajín Restaurant; Universidad Iberoamericana (Diplomado para Chefs)
- Organizations: Conservatorio de la Cultura Gastronómica Mexicana; Slow Food Mexico; Académie Culinaire de France; Club Vatel México; Club de Chefs des Chefs Cordon Bleu
- Known for: Promoting traditional Mexican cuisine
- Spouse: Giorgio De’Angeli
- Culinary career
- Cooking style: Mexican

Alicia Gironella D'Angeli (18 January 1931 – 1 February 2024) was a Mexican chef and gastronomic researcher. She published many cook books. D'Angeli was the director and co-owner of the restaurant El Tajín from 1993. She turned the restaurant into a center for culinary and cultural activities with collaboration with National Autonomous University of Mexico.

D'Angeli was credited for introducing the Slow Food movement to Mexico. She was the first woman to become a member of the Club de Chefs des Chefs Cordon Bleu.

D'Angeli died on 1 February 2024, at the age of 93.

== See also ==
- Mexican cuisine
- Slow Food
- List of chefs
- Gabriela Cámara
