= Trisha Ziff =

British filmmaker and curator (born 1956)

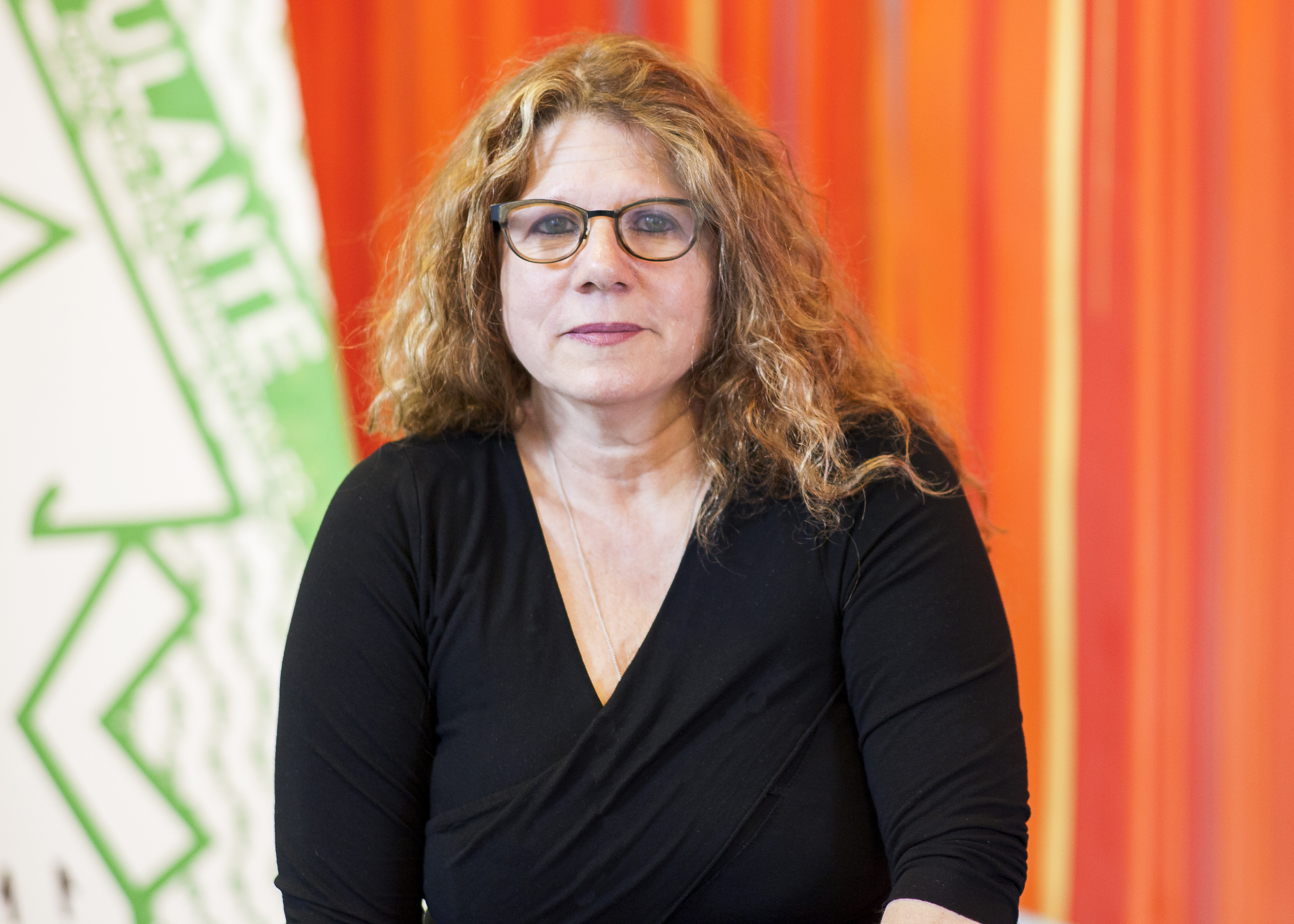
- Ziff in 2016
- Born: 21 July 1956 (age 70); Leeds, England
- Education: Canterbury College of Art; Goldsmiths College, University of London
- Occupations: Curator; filmmaker
- Notable work: Chevolution (2008); The Mexican Suitcase (2012); The Man Who Saw Too Much (2015)
- Spouse: Pedro Meyer (div.)
- Children: 1
- Mother: Ann Rachlin
- Relatives: Jan Ziff (sister)
- Awards: Guggenheim Fellowship (2000)

Trisha Ziff (born 21 July 1956) is a British curator and documentary filmmaker. She is a 2000 Guggenheim Fellow and her work includes Chevolution (2008), The Mexican Suitcase (2012), and The Man Who Saw Too Much (2015).

== Biography ==
Ziff was born on 21 July 1956 in Leeds, England, daughter of Barratts Shoes director Neville Ziff and musician and author Ann Rachlin. She obtained her pre-diploma in fine arts from Canterbury College of Art in 1974 and her BA with honours from Goldsmiths College, University of London in 1977.

Ziff worked in Mexico City, working as a curator. She edited and contributed to several books, including Still War: Photographs from the North of Ireland (1989), Between Worlds: Contemporary Mexican Photography (1990), Distant Relations: Chicano Irish and Mexican Art and Critical Writing (1995), and Hidden Truths: Bloody Sunday 1972 (1999). In 2000, she was awarded a Guggenheim Fellowship for "a study of the historical narrative of the San Patricios in a contemporary context". In 2006, she served as curator of the Victoria and Albert Museum's exhibition on the Che Guevara photograph Guerrillero Heroico, criticizing the V&A's decision to not honor her request to invite her long-time friend and president of Sinn Féin Gerry Adams. Despite the success of the exhibit, Richard Gott of The Guardian criticized its companion book, which she edited, as a "superficial and sloppy piece of historical reporting that relies considerably for its best sections on the expertise of David Kunzle".

Ziff made her documentary debut co-directing with Luis Lopez the 2008 film Chevolution, centered on the aforementioned Guevara photograph. She was director, writer, and producer for The Mexican Suitcase (2012), centered on thousands of film negatives created during the Spanish Civil War by David Seymour David Seymour, Robert Capa and Gerda Taro. Her next documentary The Man Who Saw Too Much (2015) was centered on Mexican photographer Enrique Metinides; Variety featured Ziff on their Mexico: Up Next! series, saying that "as a photographer's photographer, Ziff is intimate with the desire to risk all in taking a shot – or so she wishes". She also won Best Documentary Feature at the 58th Ariel Awards for The Man Who Saw Too Much. She later directed a feature documentary named Witkin and Witkin (2017), as well as a Netflix short documentary named A Tale of Two Kitchens (2019). She directed A Ballymurphy Man (2025), which is centered on Gerry Adams, with whom she became friends after they met in 1981.

By the 1980s, Ziff founded the Camerawork collective in the Bogside in Derry. She also co-founded the film company 212Berlin.

Ziff was married to Spanish photographer Pedro Meyer until their divorce. They have one child, a son. Her sister Jan Ziff was a journalist and children's author.

== Filmography ==
- Chevolution (2008)
- The Mexican Suitcase (2012)
- The Man Who Saw Too Much (2015)
- Witkin and Witkin (2017)
- A Tale of Two Kitchens (2019)
- A Ballymurphy Man (2025)
