= Enrique Metinides =

Mexican photographer (1934–2022)

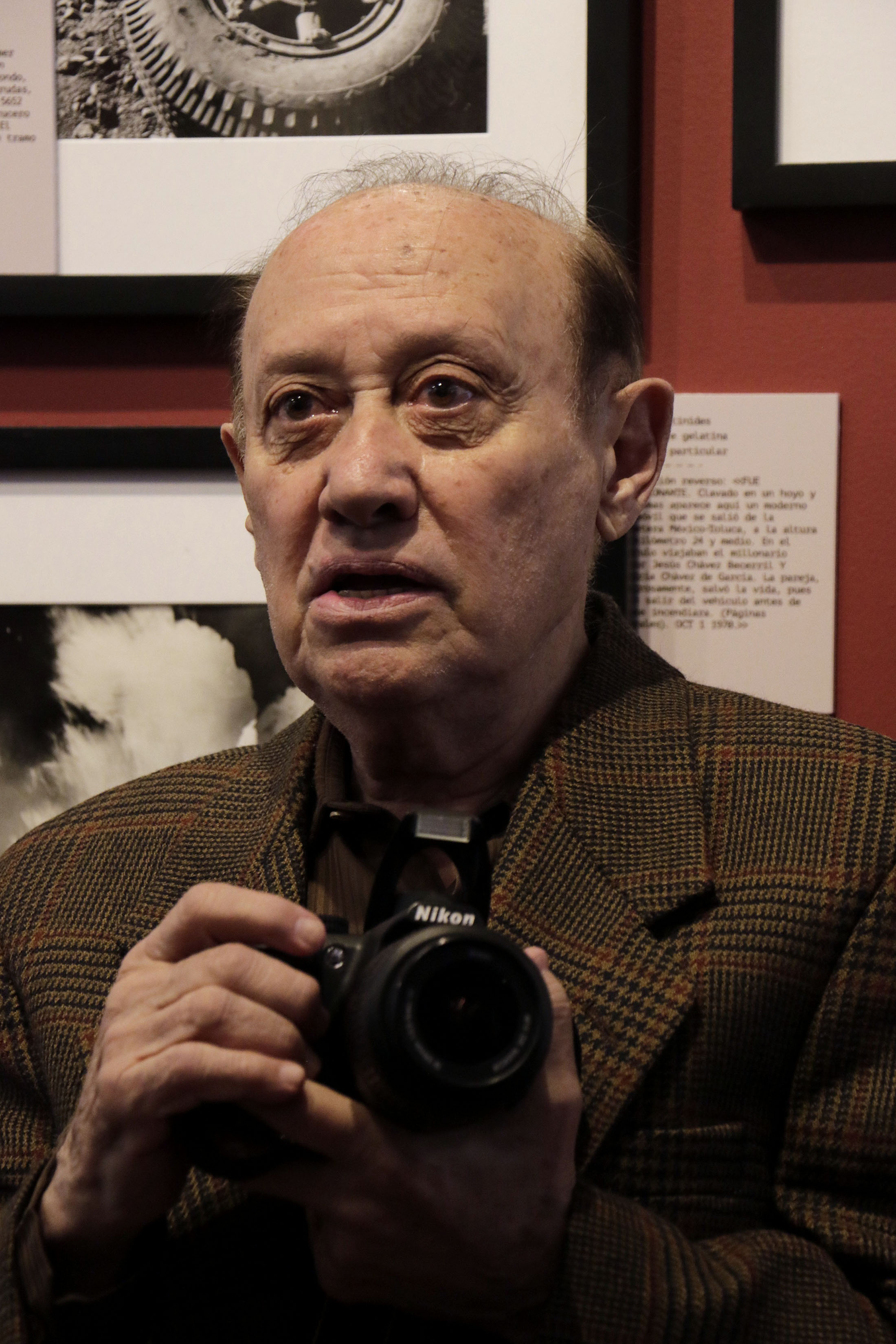
- Metinides in 2017
- Born: Jaralambos Enrique Metinides Tsironides; 12 February 1934; Mexico City, Mexico
- Died: 10 May 2022 (aged 88); Mexico City, Mexico
- Occupation: Photographer
- Known for: Street photography of crime scenes or emergencies

Jaralambos Enrique Metinides Tsironides (12 February 1934 – 10 May 2022) was a Mexican photographer. He began working with photography as a child when his father gave him a camera. Soon he began taking photos imitating popular action movies and car crashes near his father's restaurant. He published his first photo in a newspaper when he was twelve and, at age thirteen, became an unpaid assistant at La Prensa. His career as a crime photographer continued until 1997 when he retired, but since then his work has gained appreciation on its own merits, being exhibited in galleries and other venues in Mexico, the United States, and Europe.

== Early life ==
Metinides was born in Mexico City and was of Greek heritage.

When he was ten years old, his father gave him a brownie box camera. Soon after, he began taking pictures of car accidents on the streets of the San Cosme neighborhood of Mexico City where he lived. He expanded this to opportunities found hanging around the police station, going to the morgue and becoming a Red Cross volunteer to ride with ambulances. He photographed his first dead body and published his first photograph when he was only twelve years old. At age thirteen, he became an unpaid assistant to the crime photographer at La Prensa, and gained the nickname El Niño ("the boy") from the regular press photographers.

== Career ==
Metinides worked as a crime photographer from 1948 to his forced retirement in 1997, taking thousands of images and following hundreds of stories in and around Mexico City such as crime scenes, car crashes, and natural catastrophes. His work was principally published in the nota roja" (literally "red news" because of bloody images), sections and event whole journals characterized by crude text and sensationalist photography dealing with violence and death. Sometime after his retirement, his work began to be appreciated on its own merit and artistic value, being exhibited in Mexico, the United States, and Europe.

== Retirement and death ==
He retired in 1997 after being let go by La Prensa and no longer took photos of live crime or disaster scenes. However he had a collection of more than 4,000 miniature ambulances, fire trucks, and figures of firemen and medics, which he has photographed in arrangements depicting emergency scenes. He also had a large collection of plastic frogs.

Until his death, he continued to reside in Mexico City.

== Photographic style ==
Metinedes's style began as basic tabloid, at first focusing on damaged cars but soon after began to focus on the victims and emergency workers. Most of his photos are in black and white but some are in color.

The genre focuses on the grisly and visceral, and his aggressive style makes his work comparable to that of New York crime photographer Weegee. Once, when recalling his arrival to the scene of an airplane crash he stated that only after he shot his three rolls of film did he go to help with the rescue. However, the two's contents, styles, and contexts are different. What made Metinides's work distinct and popular was not so much the themes but rather the inclusion of the faces of aggressors, corpses, other victims, emergency workers, and onlookers for emotional impact. One of Metinides's most notable images is from 1979, depicting journalist Adela Legarreta Rivas (es), who had just been hit and killed by a car on Avenida Chapultepec. She is seen with her eyes still open and wedged between two telephone poles. She is freshly made up and her hair styled, on her way to a press conference on her latest book. To the right, there is an emergency worker just before he places a cloth to cover the body.

Metinides's aesthetics are derived from popular film of his era, especially black-and-white action movies related to police and gangsters. His first images as a child were based on these movies as well as the car crashes that frequently occurred in front of his father's restaurant. This movie influence can be seen in the sequence of photos, from environment to details, common for setting scenes in films. Even his use of wide-angle lenses and daylight flash is from seeing images of news photographers he saw in the movies.

Sean O'Hagan of the Guardian states of his work, "Amid the car wrecks, the burning buildings, the electrocutions, the buses hanging precariously over flyovers or submerged in rivers, this image has always stuck in my mind as emblematic of how brilliant, and ruthless, a photographer Metinides is. His art, if we can call it that, is a catalogue of death and suffering in all its random, often absurd everydayness. But it is more than that. It is a catalogue of intrusion. It makes voyeurs of us all, particularly when shown in a gallery context."

== Exhibitions ==
From 2011 to 2013, a collection of 101 photographs selected by the photographer and curator Trisha Ziff toured Europe and the Americas under the name of the "101 Tragedies of Enrique Metinides". The photos have also been published as a book with the same title, with extended captions and a biography of Metinides.

Other photos and works by the photographer have been the focus of individual exhibits at locations such as the Josée Bienvenu Gallery, New York (2008), the Anton Kern Gallery, New York (2006), Blum & Poe, Los Angeles (2006), Club Fotográfico de México, Mexico City (2005), Kunsthal, Rotterdam (2004), The Photographer's Gallery, London (2003), Air de Paris, Paris (2003), the Royal College, London (2002, 2003), and the Museo Universitario de Ciencias y Arte UNAM, Mexico City (2000). Group exhibitions which incorporated his work include those at the Nicholas Metivier Gallery, Toronto (2012), SFMOMA, San Francisco (2012), Kominek Gallery, Berlin (2012), Museum of Modern Art, New York (2008), NRW Forum Kultur und Wirtschaft, Düsseldorf (2006), Center for Contemporary Art, Antwerp (2004), Casa de América, Madrid (2004), Central de Arte Guadalajara, Guadalajara (2004), Galerie Cantal Crousel, Paris (2002), Kunst-Werke Institute for Contemporary Art, Berlin (2002), PS1, New York (2002) ), and Centro de la Imagen, Mexico City (2002).

== Awards ==
His work has won prizes from the Mexican government, journalists' associations, rescue and judicial organizations, and Kodak of Mexico. In 1997, he received the Espejo de Luz (Mirror of Light) prize, the highest given to photographers in Mexico.

== See also ==
- The Man Who Saw Too Much, documentary film about his life and work
