= Gabriela Cámara =

Mexican chef, restaurant owner, and author (born 1976)

- Born: Gabriela Cámara Bargellini; 1976 (age 49–50); Chihuahua, Chihuahua, Mexico
- Education: Universidad Iberoamericana
- Spouse: Pablo Bueno
- Children: 1
- Family: Carlos Pellicer (grandfather)
- Culinary career
- Cooking style: Mexican
- Current restaurants
- Contramar; Entremar; Cala; MeroToro

Gabriela Cámara Bargellino (born 1976) is a Mexican chef, restaurant owner, and author. The granddaughter of the Mexican poet Carlos Pellicer, she was born in Chihuahua City, Cámara grew up in Tepoztlán. In 1998, Cámara opened Contramar, a seafood restaurant in Mexico City. She opened the restaurant Cala in San Francisco in 2015. Cámara holds ownership in Mexico City restaurants Capicúa, Barricuda Diner, and MeroToro. Her cookbook, My Mexico City Kitchen, was published in 2019, the year Cámara was appointed to the Mexican government's Council of Cultural Diplomacy and as an advisor to President Andrés Manuel López Obrador.

Cámara has twice been a James Beard Foundation award semifinalist, in 2017 and 2019. In 2019, Cámara, her two restaurants, and their staff members were the subject of a Netflix documentary, A Tale of Two Kitchens. She also has a Masterclass course in which she teaches viewers how to cook Mexican food.

Cámara was included in Time's Most Influential People in 2020. Gabriela Cámara became one of the five new Iron Chefs in the American Netflix reboot Iron Chef: Quest for an Iron Legend of the Iron Chef and Iron Chef America cooking shows.

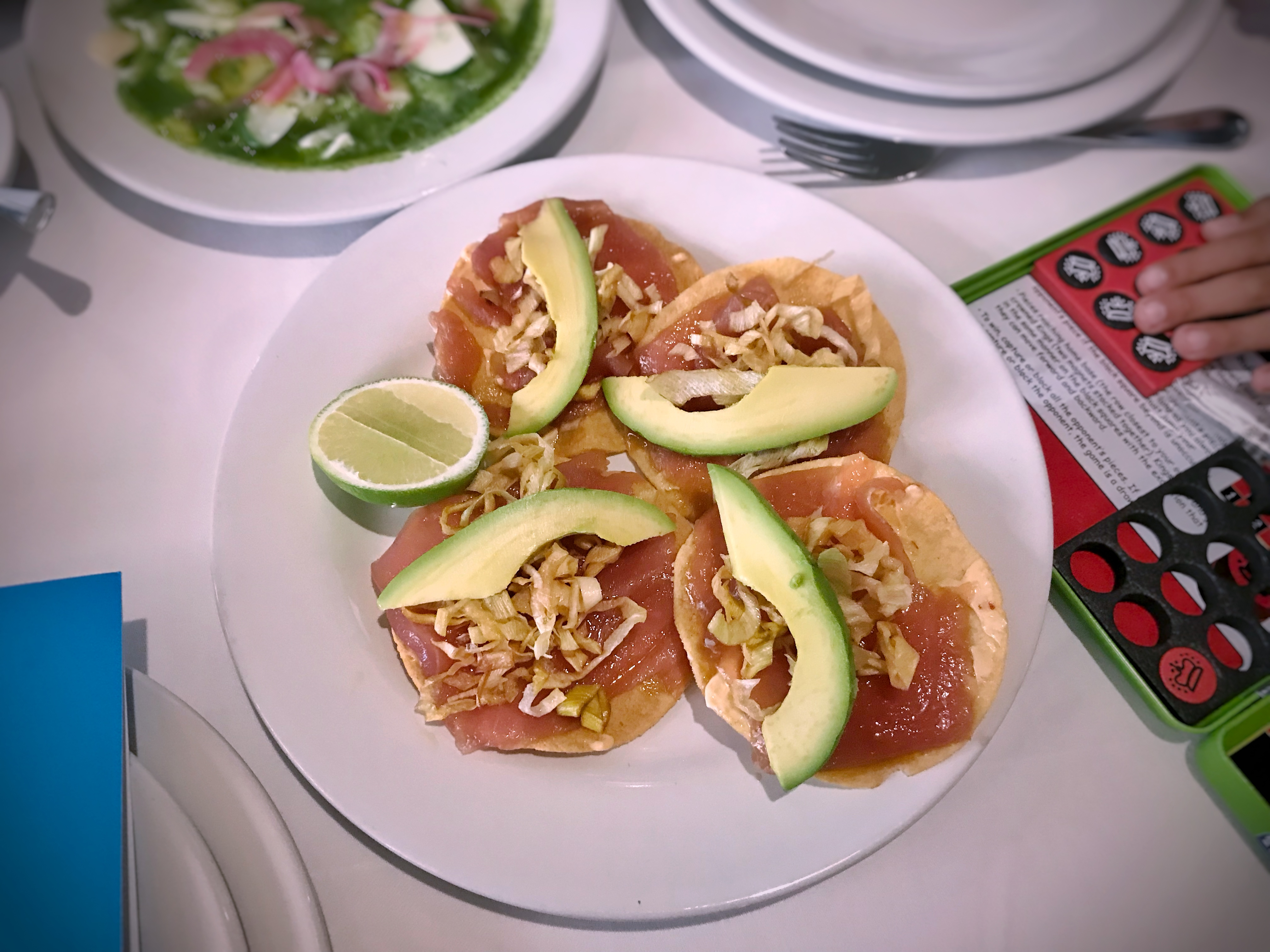
Gabriela Cámara's tuna tostada dish at Contramar

== Bibliography ==
- My Mexico City Kitchen: Recipes and Convictions ISBN 978-0399580574 (2019)

== See also ==
- Alicia Gironella De'Angeli
- Mexican cuisine
