= A Tale of Two Kitchens =

2019 documentary film

- Film poster
- Directed by: Trisha Ziff
- Distributed by: Netflix
- Release date: May 22, 2019
- Running time: 29 minutes

A Tale of Two Kitchens is a 2019 short documentary film directed by Trisha Ziff. The film explores how Mexico City restaurant owner Gabriela Cámara opens sister eatery Cala in San Francisco, with a similar menu and, most importantly, a similar employee culture than Contramar.

The documentary was released on Netflix on May 22, 2019.
