= Ann Rachlin =

British musician and author (1933–2023)

Ann Sybille Rachlin
- Born: Ann Lyttleton; 23 July 1933; Leeds, England
- Died: 20 November 2023 (aged 90)
- Occupations: Musician; author
- Spouse: Neville Ziff; Ezra Rachlin
- Children: 3 (including Jan and Trisha)

Ann Sybille Rachlin MBE (née Lyttleton; 23 July 1933 – 20 November 2023) was a British musician, author of children's books and the founder of 'Fun with Music', a stream of online stories for children with music. She was an authority on Dame Ellen Terry, the Victorian actress, and her daughter Edith Craig.

== Life ==
Ann Sybille Lyttleton was born in Leeds on 23 July 1933. Her father owned a clothing manufacturing business. Her paternal grandmother was born in Wales, and her other grandparents came as immigrants from Poland and Lithuania.

Rachlin married Neville Ziff, with whom she had three children: Jan, Max, and Trisha. They divorced after eleven years. In 1969 she married American conductor and pianist Ezra Rachlin, and they remained married until his death in 1995.

Ann Rachlin died on 20 November 2023, at the age of 90.

== Career ==
In 1965, Rachlin started to teach classical music to children through her Fun With Music classes. In these classes she related stories over classical tracks. When EMI contracted Rachlin's skills, they launched Ann's Classical Music and Stories series with 10 LPs, which were widely popular. Immediately afterwards EMI released a further 10 LPs making a collection of 20 Albums. These were then expanded to include a series of cassette tapes and then CDs. Former students at her classes included William, Prince of Wales, Prince Harry and amongst others, the children of Dame Judi Dench, Spike Milligan, Peter O'Toole, Barry Humphries and Edward Fox.

In 1976, Rachlin founded the Beethoven Fund for Deaf Children, now incorporated with The Elizabeth Foundation for Deaf Children. She was President of both charities. During the pandemic, due to the problems that lockdown created for families and schools, she made all her recording albums free to children worldwide. She also recorded her ten Famous Children books for the Royal National Institute for the Blind so that visually-impaired children could listen. For blind adults, she recorded The Tin Ring by Holocaust survivor Zdenka Fantlová, also for the RNIB.

Rachlin's performances included "Funtasia" concerts in 1986 with the London Symphony Orchestra, conducted by her husband, Ezra. When Ezra Rachlin died in 1995, Ann Rachlin continued her work with colleague Iain Kerr. In 1996 she was the subject of This Is Your Life when Yehudi Menuhin, Sir Georg Solti and Lord Runcie joined many celebrities, friends and former pupils to pay tribute to her life's work with children and music.

In October 2022, she organised "Ukraine Reborn – A Concert of Words and Music", performed in Winchelsea's St Thomas's Church, with Raphael Wallfisch (cello) and as narrators, her former pupils, actors Freddie Fox and Emilia Fox. The concert raised £20,000 for the Saint Nicholas Hospital for Children in Lviv, Ukraine, where injured children were being treated following the invasion by Russia.

Rachlin's Famous Children books have been translated into different languages including Indonesian, Finnish, Czech and two Chinese versions. She was an authority on the Victorian actress Dame Ellen Terry and her daughter Edith Craig; her collection of Terry memorabilia includes the reminiscences of Edith Craig, now published in Ann Rachlin's book Edy was a Lady.

In 1986, Rachlin was appointed Member of the Order of the British Empire by Queen Elizabeth II for her services to music and deaf children. In 2010, Rachlin was awarded a Fellowship at Grey College in the University of Durham.
