= Elena Reygadas =

Mexican chef (born 1976)

- Born: Elena Reygadas Castillo; 27 August 1976 (age 50); Mexico City, Mexico
- Occupation: Chef
- Spouse: Jaime Serra
- Children: 2
- Family: Carlos Reygadas (brother)

Elena Reygadas Castillo (born 27 August 1976) is a Mexican chef. She is the owner of the eateries Rosetta, Panadería Rosetta, Salón Rosetta, Bella Aurora and Lardo, all found in Mexico City. In 2023, she was named The World's Best Female Chef by The World's 50 Best Restaurants. Rosetta has been awarded one Michelin star and has been listed within The World's 50 Best Restaurants list.

== Career and personal life ==
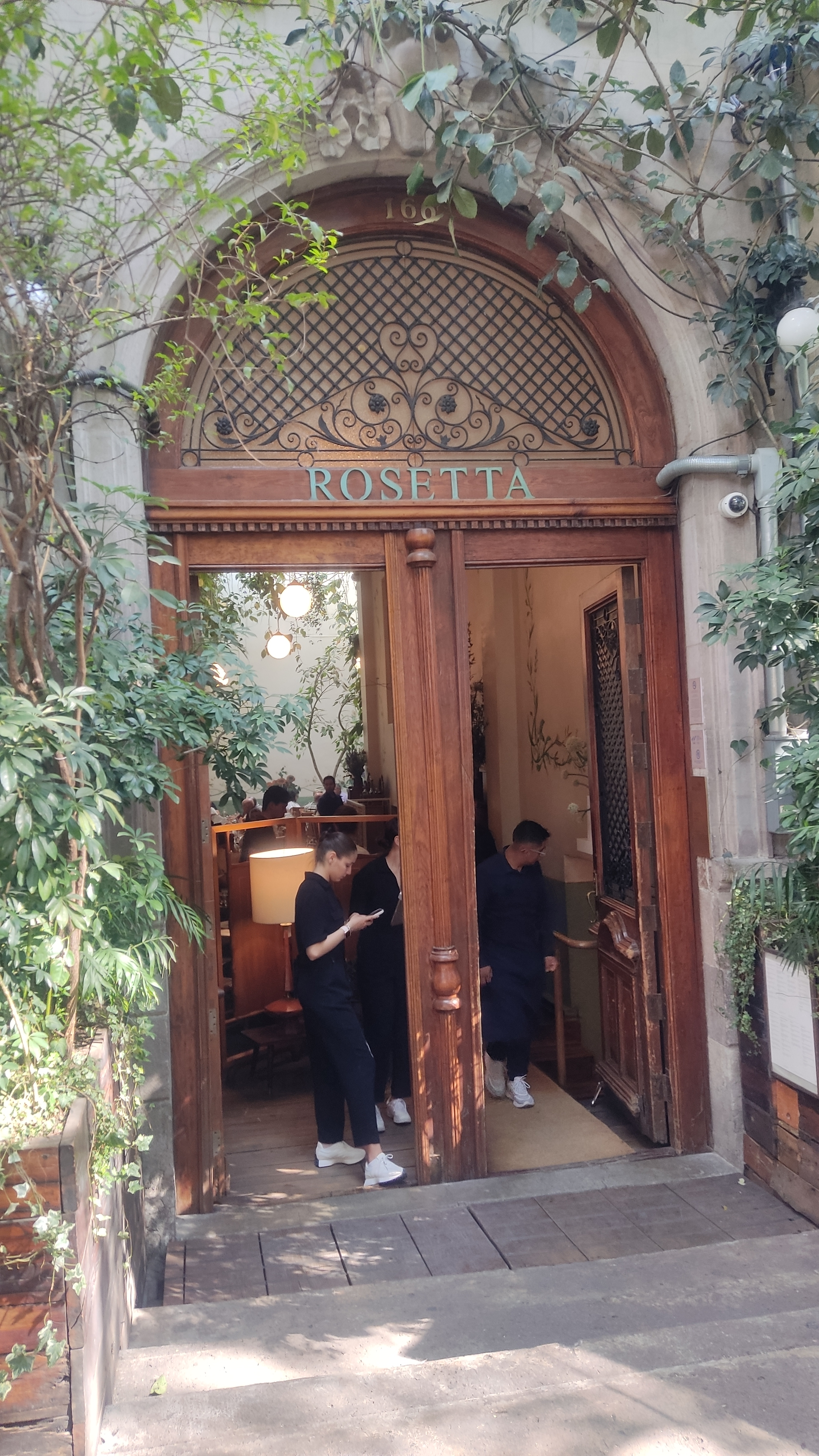
Entrance to Rosetta in Mexico City

Elena Reygadas Castillo was born in 1976 and is the sister of film director Carlos Reygadas. She studied English literature at the National Autonomous University of Mexico (UNAM), where she graduated with a thesis on The Waves by Virginia Woolf.

In 2010, she opened Rosetta in Roma, Mexico City. Originally, the restaurant became famous thanks to the homemade bread and pasta, but later added Mexican seasonal ingredients to the dishes. Following local and international attention, Reygadas established Panadería Rosetta in 2012 in the same street. The bakery is known for its guava roll, as well as traditional Mexican breads such as pan de muerto and rosca de reyes.

In September 2014, she received the Veuve Clicquot Award for Latin America's Best Female Chef. In 2015, she opened Lardo in the neighboring Condesa. In 2017, she opened Café Nin, a coffeehouse in Colonia Juárez, Mexico City. In 2019, she published her first book, Rosetta, through Sexto Piso y Bom Dia Books. It features recipes and reflective essays by Reygadas on food ethics, environmental care, and other related topics.

In 2022, she join the Basque Culinary Center International Counsil. That same year, she also launched the Elena Reygadas Scholarship, which aims to promote equal opportunities and strengthen the leadership of Mexican women in the culinary world. In 2023, she was named The World's Best Female Chef by The World's 50 Best Restaurants. Additionally, Rosetta entered with the list itself, at number 49. Later that same year, she was awarded the Order of Agricultural Merit by the French government for her contributions to agriculture. In 2024, Rosetta was awarded a Michelin star, raising to number 34 on the World's 50 Best Restaurants. Moreover, Reygadas received the 2014 Business Woman Award from Veuve Clicquot and the World's 50 Best Restaurants named her the World's Best Female Chef in 2023.

Reygadas is married to architect Jaime Serra and they have two daughters.
