= Ezra Rachlin =

Ezra Rachlin (5 December 1915 – 21 January 1995) was an American conductor and pianist.

== Life and career ==
Rachlin was born in Hollywood, California, to Jewish parents, and first showed an interest in the piano at the age of three. At age 4½ he was famous as the "youngest philosopher in Los Angeles." Home schooled by talented parents, he spoke three languages, read English, and played piano and violin. He excelled in mathematics, and was active in youth sports. He gave his first full-length recital at age five.

The Rachlins moved to Germany to assist Ezra in his studies. He performed at various salon concerts, including many at the house of the Abegg family, for whom Robert Schumann had written his Abegg Variations. Another pianist featured there was the 18-year-old Vladimir Horowitz. He became bilingual in German. He also endured antisemitism.

By the time his family returned to the United States, when he was 12, Rachlin had earned a reputation as a virtuoso performer and was offered many concert engagements. He was chosen to be the first soloist under Leopold Stokowski in the Philadelphia Orchestra Youth Concerts. A Carnegie Hall debut at age twelve was followed by study with Leopold Godowsky and Josef Lhévinne. Godowsky was present at the Carnegie Hall recital and wrote to Josef Hofmann at the Curtis Institute of Music in Philadelphia, recommending Rachlin as a student. At 13, he entered the Curtis Institute as its youngest ever pupil, to work with Hofmann.

In 1937, at age 22, Rachlin featured Sergei Rachmaninoff's Third Piano Concerto in an extensive tour of European capitals, and the composer, who had always shown keen interest in Rachlin's talent, prepared it with him. Returning to the US with his concert career in full flourish, Rachlin joined the Curtis Institute as the youngest person on the faculty at the time.

In the meantime, Rachlin had been studying conducting with Fritz Reiner at the Curtis Institute since 1935, and by 1937 had decided to devote all his time to conducting. On the recommendation of George Szell, he was appointed conductor of the Philadelphia Opera Company, but not before giving a command farewell performance as a pianist at the White House for President Franklin D. Roosevelt and First Lady Eleanor.

Rachlin was the personal conductor for Lauritz Melchior on his 1946-1949 world tour. He directed the Austin Symphony Orchestra from 1949 to 1969. He was the chief conductor of the Fort Worth Symphony from 1965 to 1971 and led the Houston Summer Symphony for several years, the latter at the invitation of Leopold Stokowski. Rachlin served as Chief Conductor of the Queensland Symphony Orchestra from 1970 to 1972, and worked with many Australian orchestras. He moved to London in 1973 and worked with the London Symphony Orchestra, the London Philharmonic Orchestra and the Hallé Orchestra. He won a gold disc for a series of recordings with the London Symphony Orchestra, one of which peaked at number 53 in Australia in 1978.

Rachlin died in London following vascular surgery, and is buried at the Golders Green Jewish Cemetery. He was twice married; his second wife Ann Rachlin, his sister, his son, three stepchildren, and various grandchildren survived him.
