= Rosetta (restaurant) =

Restaurant in Mexico City, Mexico

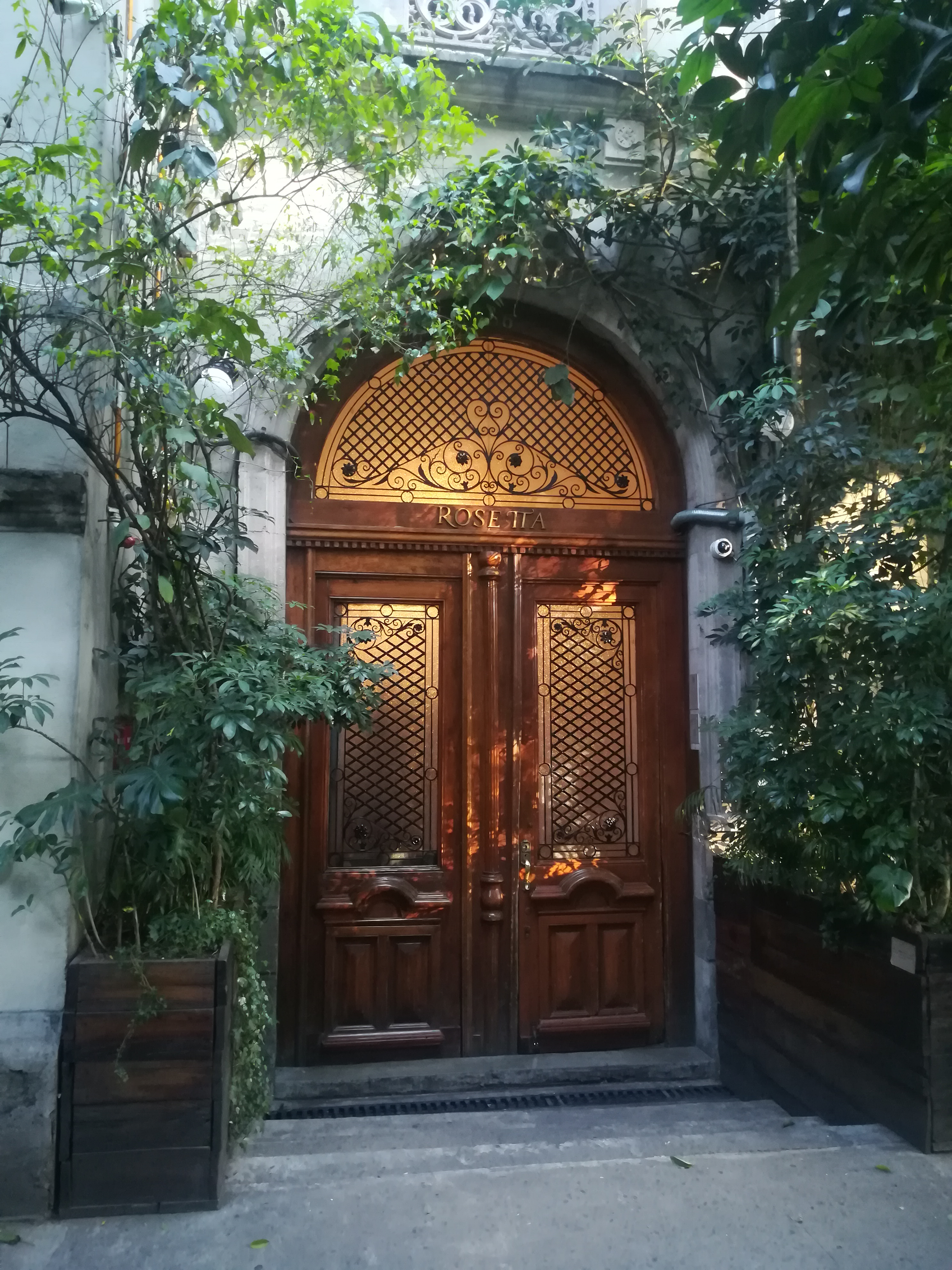
- The restaurant's entrance, 2026
- Interactive map of Rosetta

Restaurant information
- Established: February 2010
- Owner: Elena Reygadas
- Chef: Elena Reygadas
- Food type: Mexican and Mediterranean (mainly Italian)
- Rating: (Michelin Guide, 2024)
- Location: Colima 166, Roma, Cuauhtémoc, Mexico City, 06700, Mexico
- Coordinates: 19°25′11.2″N 99°09′35.2″W
- Reservations: Yes
- Website: rosetta.com.mx/en/

Rosetta is a restaurant in Colonia Roma, Cuauhtémoc, specializing in Mexican cuisine with Mediterranean—primarily Italian—influences. Founded in 2010, it offers a seasonal à la carte menu. The restaurant is owned by chef Elena Reygadas, a graduate of the International Culinary Center who previously worked at Locanda Locatelli in London. Rosetta has received favorable reviews from food critics, with particular praise for its pasta and bread. The British company William Reed Ltd has ranked the restaurant three times on its list of the World's 50 Best Restaurants and Reygadas was named their Best Female Chef in 2023. Rosetta was awarded one Michelin star in 2024 in the first Michelin Guide covering restaurants in Mexico.

== Description ==
Rosetta offers an à la carte menu that changes with the seasons. The restaurant serves Mexican dishes made with local ingredients, incorporating Mediterranean—primarily Italian—influences. For example, it sources olive oil from Baja California and burrata from Atlixco, Puebla; vegetables come from Xochimilco in Mexico City and Valle de Bravo in the State of Mexico.

All bread and pasta are handmade; according to Reygadas, the dough had been fermenting for nine years as of 2018. The signature bread is the guava roll, which Laura Tillman describes for Los Angeles Times as having a flaky, buttery crust similar to a croissant, with a filling of slow-simmered guava jam and sweet cream. Dishes have included veal sweetbreads with yogurt, plum, and za'atar; ricotta and lemon ravioli; kale tacos with pipian and romeritos; sweet potato tamales with salsa macha and buttermilk; and honey jelly with hazelnut butter ice cream and vanilla sauce.

== History ==
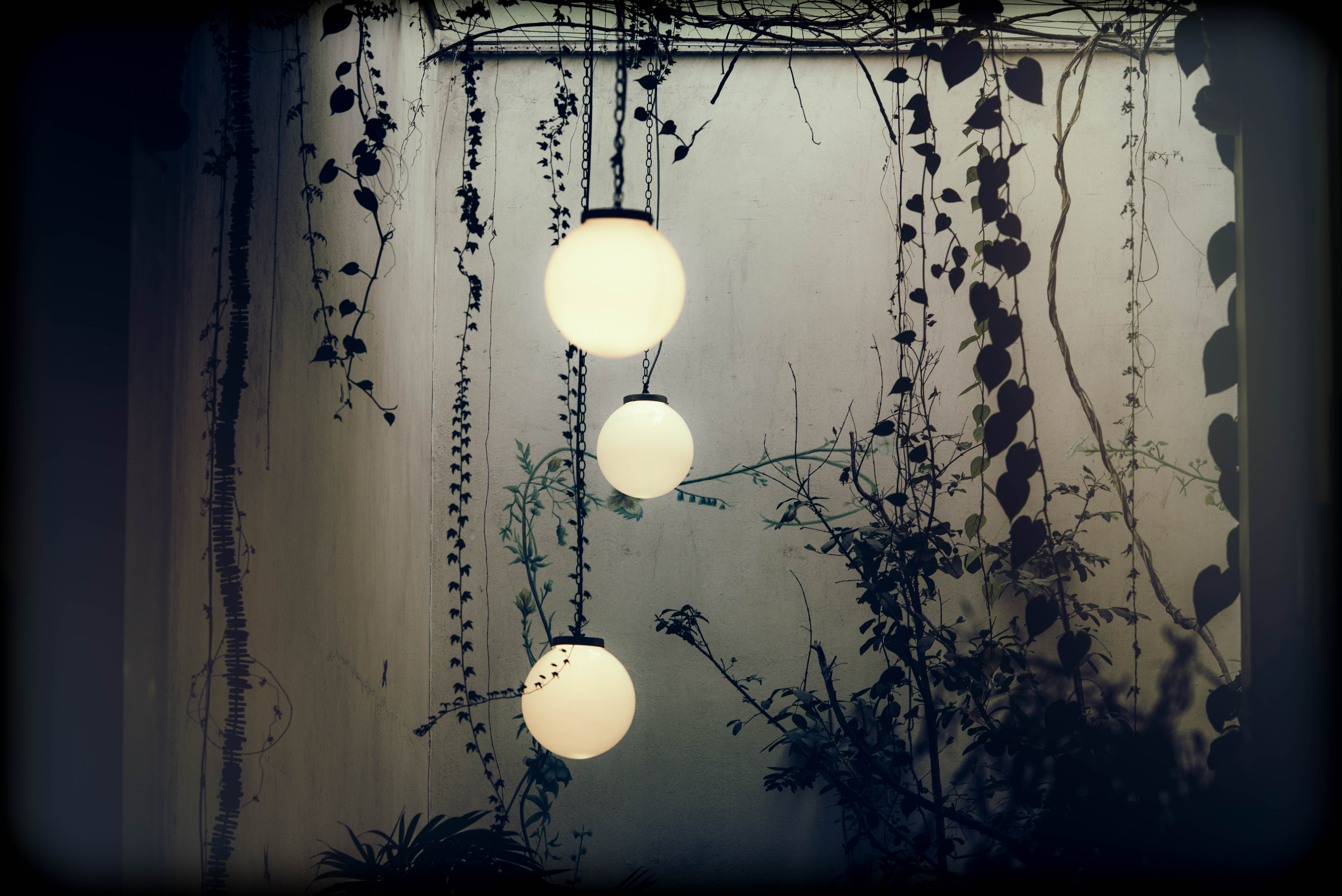
According to a Dónde Ir writer, the restaurant is decorated in a country style (interior decoration pictured).

Elena Reygadas studied gastronomy at the International Culinary Center, in New York City. She later worked at Giorgio Locatelli's restaurant Locanda Locatelli in London. After the birth of her first daughter, she returned to Mexico and opened a pop-up restaurant at Tonalá Street 20, in Colonia Roma, Mexico City.

She opened Rosetta in February 2010 in a historic Porfirian mansion on Colima Street, also in Colonia Roma. She purchased furniture obtained at markets and second-hand stores; the interior design evokes outdoor spaces. According to Tillman, the chairs offer comfort, and the lighting comes from vintage lamps and candles. The original mosaic floor was replaced by wood flooring and the walls were painted in pastel colors.

The restaurant began to gain popularity and Reygadas' baking earned received positive feedback from diners. Reygadas then opened two bakeries, one at Colima Street 179 and the other at Puebla 242 in the same neighborhood. The former location had housed an art gallery that closed during the COVID-19 pandemic in Mexico. A third bakery, named Café Nin, opened at Havre Street 73, in Colonia Juárez.

=== Work harassment allegations ===
In 2021, former employees of Reygadas' businesses, including Rosetta and its bakery, reported alleged workplace and sexual harassment, claiming their tips were withheld. There were also accusations of racism among the staff, including preferential treatment of foreign customers over locals. Reygadas posted, "I have read with concern a series of anonymous reports on social media that point to misconduct by various individuals who work or have worked at my establishments. For me, and the values I aim to promote, any kind of inappropriate behavior is unacceptable and must be addressed with the utmost seriousness". She added that measures would be implemented, such as "equal treatment training" and changes to service protocol, including having customers being able to place orders directly with cashiers instead of waitstaff.

== Reception ==
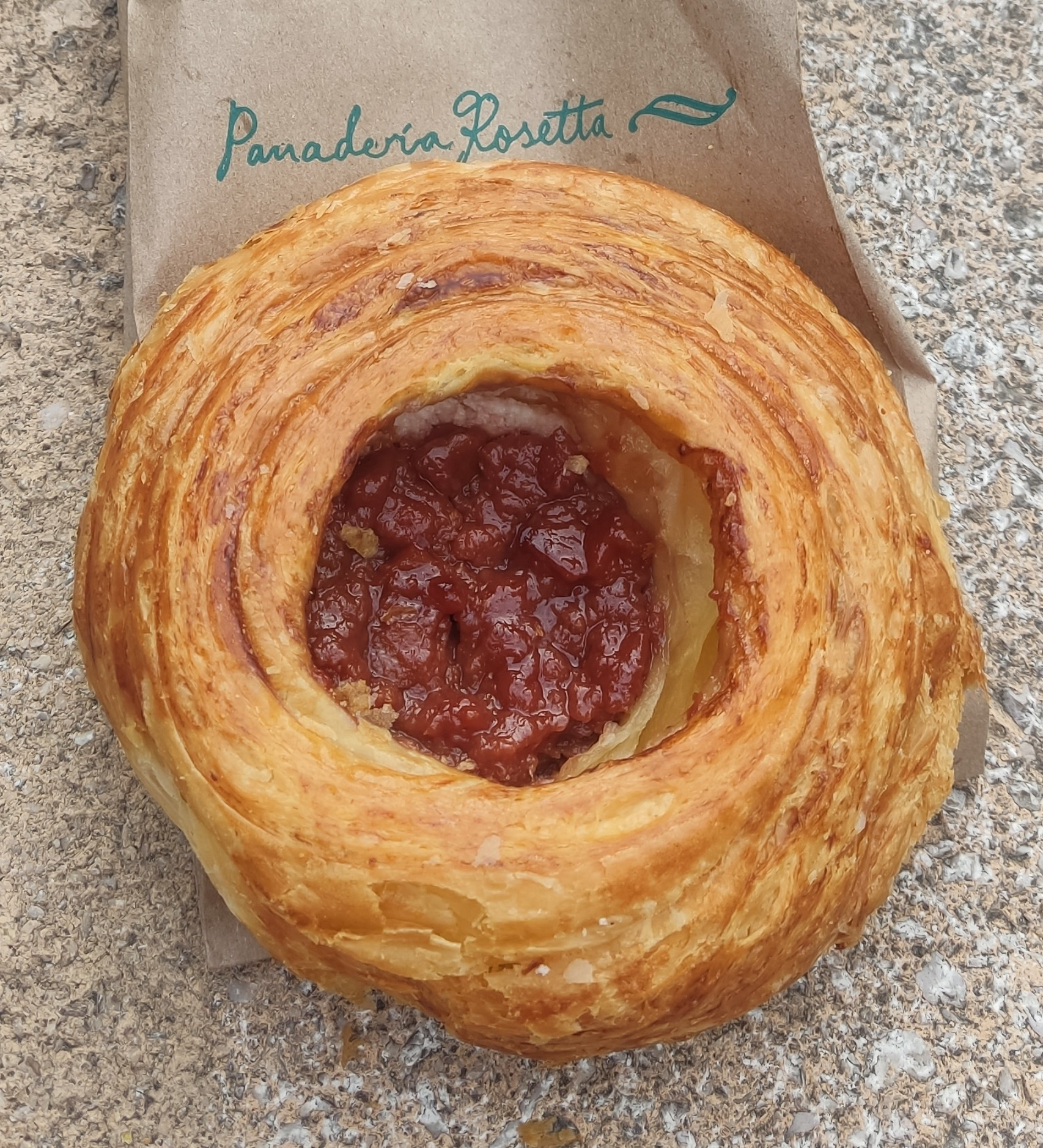
The guava roll has received positive reviews

In Chilango, Miguel Rivera recommended the bread and pasta for their preparation style. A reviewer from Bon Appétit echoed this view, praising the pasta, which was also commended by Julia Cooke for Condé Nast Traveler and Maridel Reyes for Bloomberg Businessweek.

In its list of the top 23 restaurants in Mexico City, Time Out ranked Rosetta third. In her review for the same magazine, Beatriz Vernon rated the restaurant with five out of five stars, writing: "Although the menu is constantly changing, Rosetta is always full because everyone can rest easy knowing that whatever they order, it'll be simple and delicious. The vibe here is friendly in the evening and full-on romantic at night". Leslie Yeh from Lifestyle Asia described the restaurant as intimate and the plates as "exciting".

A Fodor's reviewer praised the Italian influence and Mexican ingredients, while a writer from The Economic Times lauded the guava rolls. The editorial team of Travel + Leisure En Español considered that Reygadas and Rosetta demonstrate a "deep respect" for the ingredients and create inventive dishes. Additionally, they praised the location. Luke Burgess praised the cooking as "powerful and subtle", lightly referencing Italian cuisine while harmonizing with Mexican ingredients, as well as lauding the dining room.

=== Awards ===
Rosetta has appeared three times on William Reed Ltd's list of the World's 50 Best Restaurants: ranked number 34 (2024), 46 (2025), and 49 (2023). It also has appeared in the extended list ranked number 96 (2026).

When the Michelin Guide debuted in 2024 in Mexico, it awarded 18 eateries with Michelin stars. Rosetta received one star, signifying "high-quality cooking, worth a stop". The guide added that Reygadas' cooking style was influenced by global cuisines and her "[d]ishes are designed for sharing, ideal for those who want to sample more of her ingenious creations".

Moreover, Reygadas received the 2014 Business Woman Award from Veuve Clicquot and the World's 50 Best Restaurants named her the World's Best Female Chef in 2023. The restaurant received a Food Made Good recognizion from the Sustainable Restaurant Association in 2025 for its sustainable practices.

Rosetta, along with six other Michelin-starred restaurants in Mexico City, was honored by Martí Batres, the head of the Mexico City government. He presented the chefs with an onyx statuette in appreciation of their role in promoting tourism in the capital city. The statuette, inspired by the pre-Hispanic sculpture The Young Woman of Amajac, pays tribute to the important contributions of Indigenous women to both national and international gastronomy.

== See also ==
- List of Italian restaurants
- List of Mexican restaurants
- List of Michelin-starred restaurants in Mexico

== Bibliography ==
- Cooke, Julia (December 2015). "Mexico City". Condé Nast Traveler. Vol. 50, no. 11. ISSN 0893-9683.
- Helou, Anissa; Guzmán, Pilar; Petrini, Andrea; Needleman, Deborah; Prior, David (October 2017). "Where in the World to Eat". Condé Nast Traveler. Vol. 52, no. 9. ISSN 0893-9683.
- Reyes, Maridel (4 May 2015). "Take a Real Vacation". Bloomberg Businessweek. No. 4425. ISSN 0007-7135.
