= Masala y Maíz =

Restaurant in Mexico City, Mexico

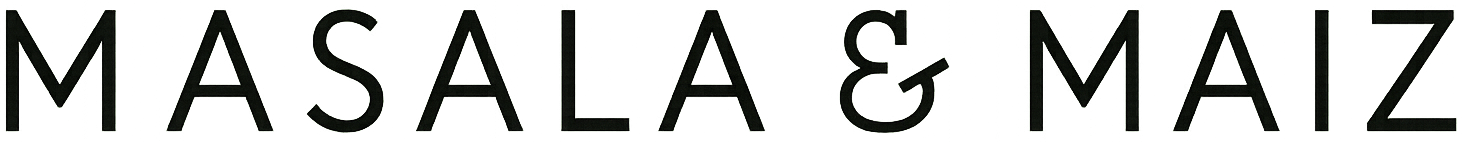

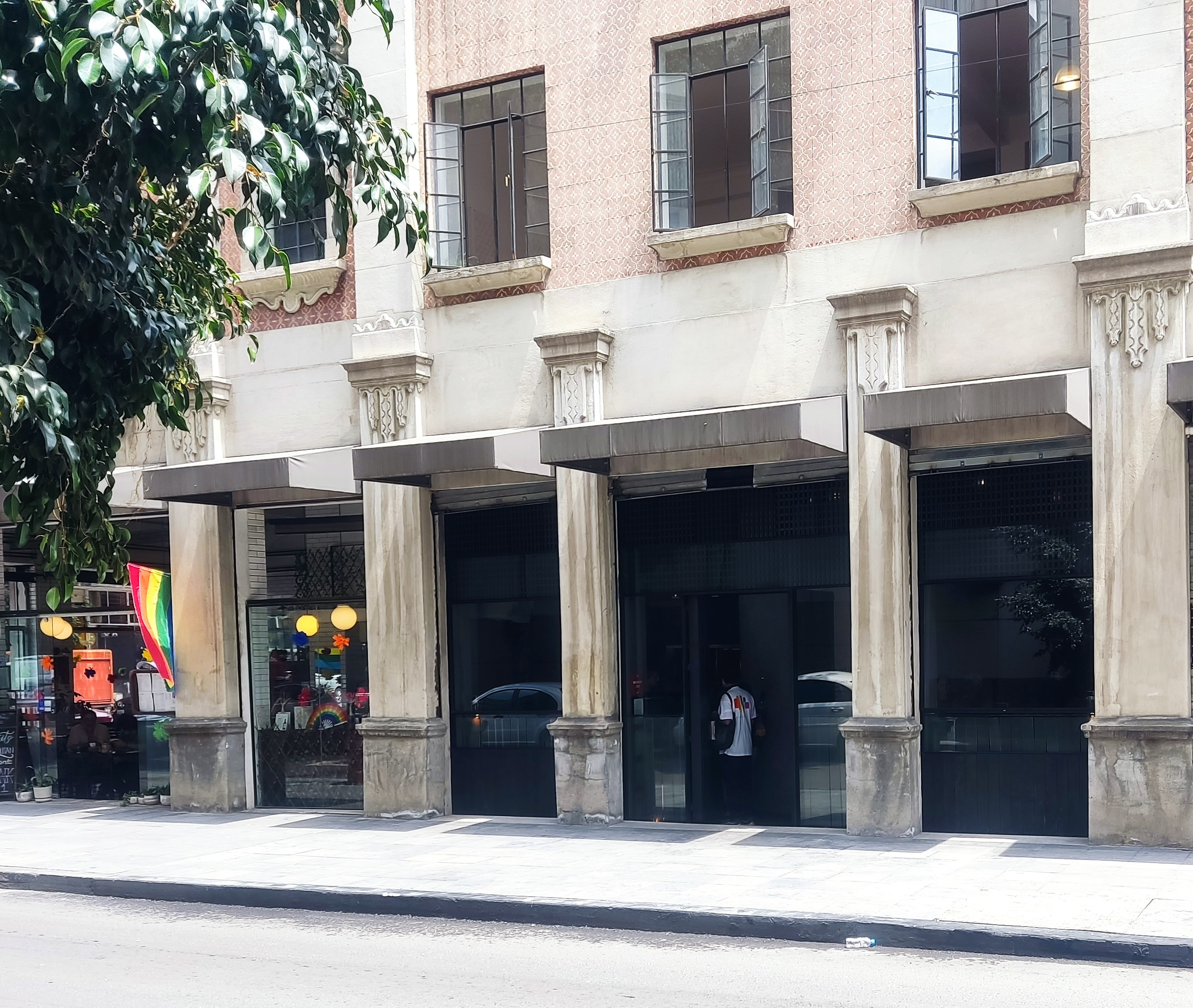
- The restaurant's exterior in 2025
- Interactive map of Masala y Maíz

Restaurant information
- Established: October 2017
- Owners: Norma Listman; Saqib Keval
- Food type: Fusion; Mexican; African; Indian
- Rating: (Michelin Guide, 2025)
- Location: Calle Artículo 123 #116 C, Juárez, Mexico City, 06040, Mexico
- Coordinates: 19°25′58.7″N 99°08′56.4″W
- Other information: Nearest stations: Juárez metro station Juárez bus station Juárez bus station
- Website: masalaymaiz.com

Masala y Maíz is a fusion restaurant in Mexico City known for blending Mexican, African and Indian cuisines. Founded by chefs Norma Listman and Saqib Keval, the restaurant defines its approach as mestizaje rebelde ("rebellious mestizaje"), a concept that, according to its founders, acknowledges the complex legacies of colonization by naming systems of oppression while also celebrating the diverse cultures that have shaped their culinary influences.

The restaurant was opened in 2017 in the neighborhood of San Miguel Chapultepec, and despite bureaucratic challenges and a temporary closure during the COVID-19 pandemic, it has gained recognition for its innovative dishes. Masala y Maíz later relocated to the neighborhood of Juárez, near the city's historic center. Dishes sold at the restaurant have included uttapam topped with chickpeas and chutney; jumbo shrimps grilled with masala; or gordita with za'atar raita.

It has received acclaim from local and international food critics and was awarded one Michelin star in the second Michelin Guide covering restaurants in Mexico.

== Description ==
Masala y Maíz is a fusion cuisine restaurant that combines elements from Mexican, African and Indian cuisines. Its chefs describe their approach as mestizaje rebelde (rebellious mestizaje), explaining that it "encompasses a complicated history. It doesn't deny the oppression systems that come with colonization. In fact, it names them, while also giving credit to everybody else who forms that particular culture, in food specifically, at a specific time and place". The restaurant serves food that incorporate masala, the traditional Indian spice blend, along with Mexican staples such as maize, a combination that forms its name.

Menu items have included Makai Paka-style esquites; chilpachole with tamale and soft-shell crab; jumbo peel-and-eat shrimp grilled with masala; gordita with lamb chorizo, za'atar raita, and almond sauce; uttapam made from fermented rice batter topped with chickpeas and tamarind-date chutney; and crispy chicken served with a fennel, jícama, and green mango salad. Dessert options have included chocolate tamale with orange supremes, avocado mousse, and pistachio and rose powders; blackberry and hibiscus cake; lemon tea panna cotta; and cardamom meringue with fig, pear, and walnut.

Malika Verma describes the restaurant's architecture as a blend of Mexican brutalism and 1980s pop, featuring black textured walls made with sprayed concrete. Ceilings were coated in silver paint to reflect and amplify the available light.

== History ==
The couple Norma Listman and Saqib Keval met in the San Francisco Bay Area of the United States. While Listman was born in Mexico, Keval has an Indian and East African background. According to them, they first noticed culinary parallels between their cultures while creating a menu for a party. Listman returned to Mexico in 2017 with the goal of opening a tortilleria, while Keval remained in California. After securing a lease for a building that included access to a kitchen, they opened Masala y Maíz in the neighborhood of San Miguel Chapultepec, in Mexico City. They said that they shaped the restaurant with a focus on community, artistic expression, and political engagement.

Masala y Maíz was originally scheduled to open on 20 September 2017, but an earthquake that struck the day before postponed its inauguration until the following month; in the meantime they delivered hot meals. Following the opening, the restaurant drew interest from foreign diners. According to Evan Upchurch of Travesías magazine, its yellow entrance had a "funky vibe". Its interior was narrow, and deep, with a single long table that split the space in two.

In April 2018, the government of Mexico City temporarily closed the restaurant. The cooks said the reasons were unclear, and then they refused to pay a bribe to expedite the reopening process. Over the following five months, the couple hosted pop-up events in restaurants around the city while continuing to resolve the closure. Masala y Maíz was reopened in September, but was prohibited from offering dinner service (except private events) and from serving strong alcohol due to a neighborhood ordinance.

In 2019, the restaurant was relocated to Calle Marsella, 72, in Colonia Juárez, with its furniture designed by Pedro Reyes. He said that he "created a lightweight, functional, and dynamic chair, with a seat that represents the base of a pyramid". ATRA Form made the furniture using a bluing process to treat the metal, giving the iron a dark finish. Reyes explained that the wood was brushed to accentuate the grain, adding warmth to the material. The tables were crafted from Guatemalan Tikal marble. The location had a communal table, as well as a terrace area for outdoor dining. The restaurant's seating capacity had space for 34 people.

The restaurant was affected by the COVID-19 pandemic in Mexico, leading to a temporary closure. It operated as a delivery service, even though their dishes were not originally intended to be served that way. They later operated as a worker cooperative, selling eggs, vegetables, bread, wine, beer, frozen pizzas, sauces, and handcrafted goods from affiliated producers, distributing the profits equitably. The restaurant has also offered promotions that let customers to eat freely and pay what they can, without fixed prices—an approach Listman describes as "cooking to restore".

Masala y Maíz has engaged in various forms of political and social activism. For Listman, sitting down to eat is a moment for reflection, and she sees food as a political issue that speaks to her decisions and to the interconnections with other societies and the environment. The restaurant has supported feminist causes; on International Women's Day (8 March), it invited women—cisgender, transgender, and gender-diverse—to dine and pay what they could, donating all proceeds from a special donut sale to a feminist collective. Political messages such as "From Palestine to Colombia, long live the anti-imperialist struggle" and criticisms of U.S. immigration policy have also appeared on their menu. The chefs have criticized the Mexican tax system, arguing that it harms small-scale producers who often do not fully understand how the Tax Administration Service works.

In 2025, the address was reported at Calle Artículo 123, 116 C, in the same neighborhood, near the Juárez metro and bus stations.

== Reception ==
Una Pérez Ruiz gave Masala y Maíz a four out of five star rating for Time Out, saying that the chefs "mix Mexican flavors and Indian and African spices in the most natural and harmonious way". Food critic Marco Beteta described the restaurant as offering inventive cuisine with intense flavor combinations, complemented by a selected natural wine list. Scarlett Lindeman of Condé Nast Traveler described it as a modern take on the traditional three-course comida corrida. While writing for Bon Appétit, she also described it as a healthy dining option in the city. Evan Upchurch wrote in Afar that entering the building "leads to a culinary experience that goes way beyond the food served".

The World's 50 Best Restaurants, published by William Reed Ltd, nominated Masala y Maíz for the 2021 The Macallan Icon Award. However, Listman and Keval declined the nomination, stating:

In our view, institutions like The World's 50 Best promote a fractured culture built on abuse and sexism, among other issues. We firmly believe that in order to bring about the change our industry needs, we must stop contributing to a system that rewards and thrives on the exploitation of workers. (Note: Original quote in Spanish: A nuestro juicio, instituciones como The World's 50 Best fomentan una cultura fracturada a causa del abuso y el sexismo (entre otros). Estamos convencidos de que para lograr el cambio que nuestra industria necesita, requerimos dejar de contribuir con un sistema que recompensa y prospera a partir de la explotación de los trabajadores.)

The restaurant received a Bib Gourmand rating from the Michelin Guide in 2024, meaning "exceptionally good food at moderate prices". The guide upgraded the ranking to one Michelin star in 2025, meaning "high-quality cooking, worth a stop". Regarding the award, Listman said she feels "conflicted about the star". While she is honored to receive it, she would like to return it, as she is critical of such guides. Saqib said the recognition serves as a platform for them to "push for real change".

== See also ==
- List of African restaurants
- List of Indian restaurants
- List of Mexican restaurants
- List of restaurants in Mexico
