= List of Michelin Bib Gourmand restaurants in Mexico =

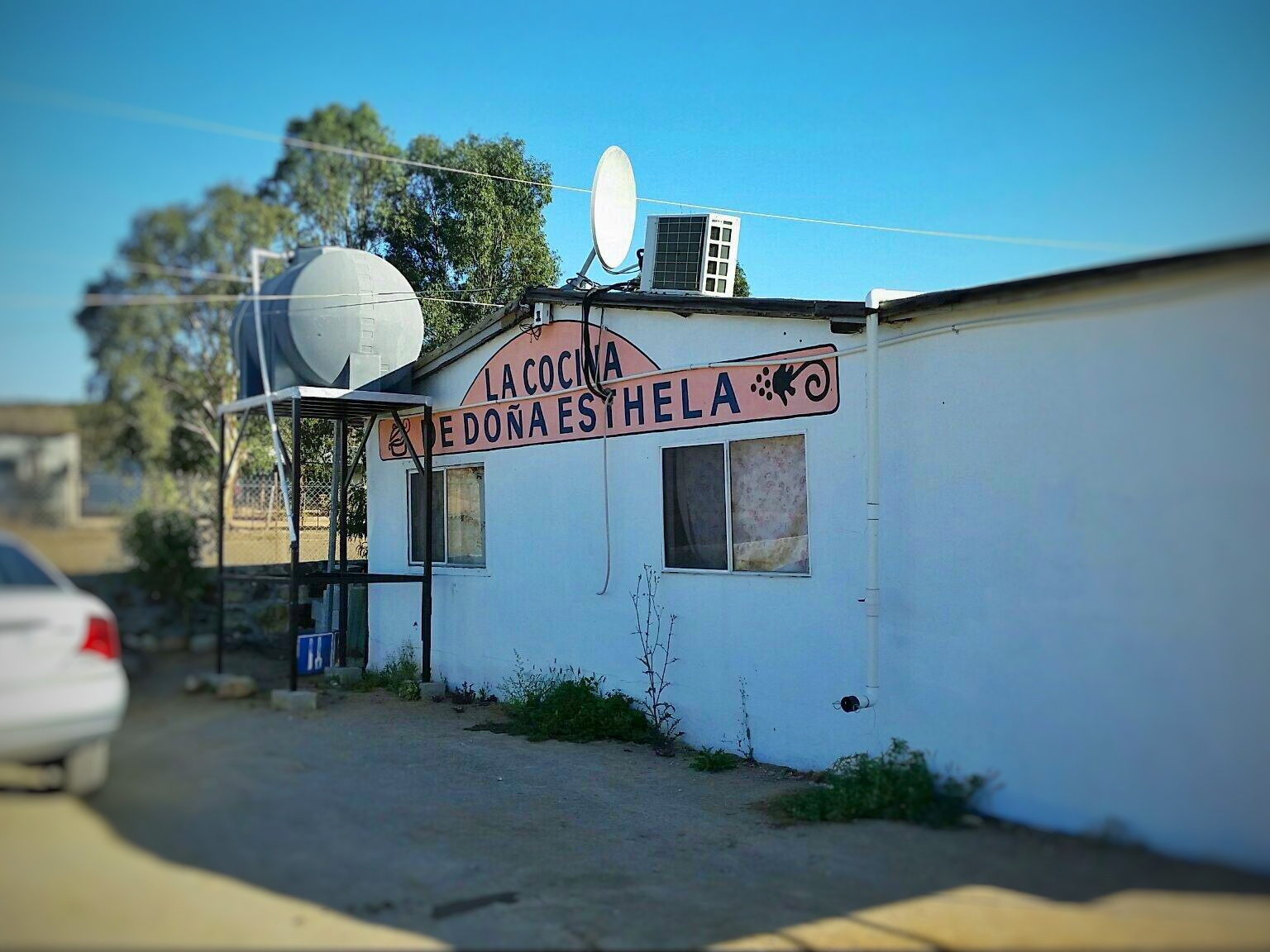
La Cocina de Doña Esthela, along with other seven restaurants, received a Bib Gourmand in the first guide covering Baja California

As of the 2026 Michelin Guide, a total of 63 restaurants in Mexico have a Michelin Bib Gourmand recognition.

The Michelin Guides have been published by the French tire company Michelin since 1900. They were designed as a guide to tell drivers about eateries they recommended to visit and to subtly sponsor their tires, by encouraging drivers to use their cars more and therefore need to replace the tires as they wore out. The Michelin Bib Gourmand designation debuted internationally in 1997 and highlights restaurants offering "exceptionally good food at moderate prices". They must offer menu items priced below a maximum determined by local economic standards.

Per Michelin's own rating system, the Bib Gourmand is considered "Not quite a star, but most definitely not a consolation prize" and a "just-as-esteemed rating." As with Michelin stars, restaurants can also lose their Bib Gourmand designation. Bib Gourmand restaurants are assessed often by Michelin's inspectors, and must meet the required standards to remain on the list.

The Michelin Guide debuted in Mexico in 2024, assessing restaurants in Mexico City and five states - Baja California, Baja California Sur, Nuevo León, Oaxaca, and Quintana Roo. In 2026, the guide expanded to include the states of Jalisco, Puebla, and Yucatán.

== Baja California ==
As of the 2026 Michelin Guide, there are 8 restaurants in Baja California with a Bib Gourmand rating.

Key
| ✅ | Indicates a restaurant with a Michelin Bib Gourmand designation |
| — | The restaurant did not receive a Bib Gourmand that year |
| Closed | The restaurant is no longer open |

| Name | Cuisine | Location | 2024 | 2025 | 2026 |
|---|---|---|---|---|---|
| Carmelita Molino y Cocina | Mexican | Tijuana | ✅ | ✅ | ✅ |
| Casa Marcelo | Mexican | Ensenada | ✅ | ✅ | ✅ |
| Fauna | Mexican | Ensenada | — | — | ✅ |
| Humo y Sal | Mexican | Ensenada | ✅ | ✅ | ✅ |
| La Cocina de Doña Esthela | Mexican | El Porvenir | ✅ | ✅ | ✅ |
| La Concheria | Mexican | Ensenada | ✅ | ✅ | ✅ |
| Merak | Contemporary | Villa de Juárez | ✅ | Closed | |
| Sabina | Mexican | Ensenada | ✅ | ✅ | ✅ |
| Villa Torél | Mexican | Villa de Juárez | ✅ | ✅ | ✅ |
| Reference(s) | | | | | |

== Baja California Sur ==
As of the 2025 Michelin Guide, there are 3 restaurants in Baja California Sur with a Bib Gourmand rating.

Key
| ✅ | Indicates a restaurant with a Michelin Bib Gourmand designation |

| Name | Cuisine | Location | 2024 | 2025 | 2026 |
|---|---|---|---|---|---|
| Cocina de Campo by Agricole | Californian / Mexican | El Pescadero | ✅ | ✅ | ✅ |
| Flora's Field Kitchen | Contemporary | San José del Cabo | ✅ | ✅ | ✅ |
| Metate | Mexican | Cabo San Lucas | ✅ | ✅ | ✅ |
| Reference(s) | | | | | |

== Jalisco ==
As of the 2026 Michelin Guide, there are 3 restaurants in Jalisco with a Bib Gourmand rating. Michelin first began rating restaurants in the state in 2026.

Key
| ✅ | Indicates a restaurant with a Michelin Bib Gourmand designation |

| Name | Cuisine | Location | 2026 |
|---|---|---|---|
| ICÚ | Mexican | Puerto Vallarta | ✅ |
| PalReal | Mexican | Guadalajara | ✅ |
| Tacos Y Gorditas Elvira | Mexican | Guadalajara | ✅ |
| Reference(s) | | | |

== Mexico City ==
As of the 2026 Michelin Guide, there are 27 restaurants in Mexico City with a Bib Gourmand rating.

Key
| ✅ | Indicates a restaurant with a Michelin Bib Gourmand designation |
| — | The restaurant did not receive a Bib Gourmand that year |

| Name | Cuisine | Location | 2024 | 2025 | 2026 |
|---|---|---|---|---|---|
| Aleli Rooftop | Spanish | Mexico City – Cuauhtémoc | ✅ | ✅ | ✅ |
| Caracol de Mar | Mexican / Peruvian | Mexico City – Cuauhtémoc | ✅ | ✅ | ✅ |
| Comal Oculto | Mexican | Mexico City – Miguel Hidalgo | ✅ | ✅ | ✅ |
| Comedor Jacinta | Mexican | Mexico City – Miguel Hidalgo | ✅ | ✅ | ✅ |
| Contramar | Seafood | Mexico City – Cuauhtémoc | — | ✅ | ✅ |
| El Vilsito | Mexican | Mexico City – Benito Juárez | ✅ | ✅ | ✅ |
| Expendio de Maíz (Note: Restaurant upgraded to a Michelin star in the 2025 guide) | Mexican | Mexico City – Cuauhtémoc | ✅ | — | — |
| Filigrana | Mexican | Mexico City – Cuauhtémoc | ✅ | ✅ | ✅ |
| Fugaz | Mediterranean / Mexican | Mexico City – Cuauhtémoc | ✅ | ✅ | ✅ |
| Gaba (Note: Restaurant upgraded to a Michelin star in the 2026 guide) | Mexican | Mexico City – Cuauhtémoc | — | ✅ | — |
| Galanga Thai House | Thai | Mexico City – Cuauhtémoc | ✅ | ✅ | ✅ |
| Galea | Italian | Mexico City – Cuauhtémoc | ✅ | ✅ | ✅ |
| Jowong | Korean | Mexico City – Cuauhtémoc | — | ✅ | ✅ |
| La 89 | Seafood | Mexico City – Cuauhtémoc | — | ✅ | ✅ |
| Los Consentidos del Barrio | Mexican | Mexico City – Benito Juárez | ✅ | ✅ | ✅ |
| Masala y Maíz | Indian / Mexican | Mexico City – Cuauhtémoc | ✅ | — | — |
| Molino El Pujol | Mexican | Mexico City – Cuauhtémoc | ✅ | ✅ | ✅ |
| Pargot | Mexican | Mexico City – Cuauhtémoc | ✅ | ✅ | ✅ |
| Pink Rambo | Contemporary | Mexico City – Cuauhtémoc | — | ✅ | ✅ |
| Plonk | Asian Fusion / Mexican | Mexico City – Cuauhtémoc | — | ✅ | ✅ |
| Raíz | Mexican | Mexico City – Miguel Hidalgo | ✅ | ✅ | ✅ |
| Siembra Tortillería | Mexican | Mexico City – Miguel Hidalgo | ✅ | ✅ | ✅ |
| Tacos del Valle | Mexican | Mexico City – Cuauhtémoc | — | ✅ | ✅ |
| Tacos Los Alexis | Mexican | Mexico City – Cuauhtémoc | ✅ | ✅ | ✅ |
| Tacos Charly | Mexican | Mexico City – Tlalpan | ✅ | ✅ | ✅ |
| Taqueria El Jarocho | Mexican | Mexico City – Cuauhtémoc | ✅ | ✅ | ✅ |
| Taqueria Los Cocuyos | Mexican | Mexico City – Cuauhtémoc | ✅ | ✅ | ✅ |
| Taquería Los Milanesos | Mexican | Mexico City – Álvaro Obregón | — | ✅ | ✅ |
| Ultramarinos Demar | Seafood | Mexico City – Cuauhtémoc | — | ✅ | ✅ |
| Vigneron | French | Mexico City – Cuauhtémoc | — | ✅ | ✅ |
| Voraz | Mexican | Mexico City – Cuauhtémoc | — | ✅ | — |
| Reference(s) | | | | | |

== Nuevo León ==
As of the 2026 Michelin Guide, there are 2 restaurants in Nuevo León with a Bib Gourmand rating.

Key
| ✅ | Indicates a restaurant with a Michelin Bib Gourmand designation |
| — | The restaurant did not receive a Bib Gourmand that year |

| Name | Cuisine | Location | 2024 | 2025 | 2026 |
|---|---|---|---|---|---|
| El Bambi's Cafe | Mexican | San Pedro Garza García | — | — | ✅ |
| Tacos Doña Mary La Gritona | Mexican | Monterrey | ✅ | ✅ | ✅ |
| Reference(s) | | | | | |

== Oaxaca ==
As of the 2026 Michelin Guide, there are 5 restaurants in Oaxaca with a Bib Gourmand rating.

Key
| ✅ | Indicates a restaurant with a Michelin Bib Gourmand designation |
| — | The restaurant did not receive a Bib Gourmand that year |
| Closed | The restaurant is no longer open |

| Name | Cuisine | Location | 2024 | 2025 | 2026 |
|---|---|---|---|---|---|
| Alfonsina | Mexican | Oaxaca City | ✅ | ✅ | — |
| Cobarde | Contemporary | Oaxaca City | ✅ | Closed | |
| La Olla | Mexican | Oaxaca City | ✅ | ✅ | ✅ |
| Labo Fermento | Asian Fusion | Oaxaca City | ✅ | ✅ | ✅ |
| Las Quince Letras | Oaxacan | Oaxaca City | ✅ | ✅ | ✅ |
| Tierra del Sol | Mexican | Oaxaca City | ✅ | ✅ | ✅ |
| Xaok | Mexican | Oaxaca City | — | ✅ | ✅ |
| Reference(s) | | | | | |

== Puebla ==
As of the 2026 Michelin Guide, there are 8 restaurants in Puebla with a Bib Gourmand rating. Michelin first began rating restaurants in the state in 2026.

Key
| ✅ | Indicates a restaurant with a Michelin Bib Gourmand designation |

| Name | Cuisine | Location | 2026 |
|---|---|---|---|
| Cultivo | Mexican | Puebla City | ✅ |
| El Güero Marinero | Mexican / Seafood | Puebla City | ✅ |
| Jacinto y Yo | Mexican | Puebla City | ✅ |
| Los Camellos | Mexican | Puebla City | ✅ |
| Moyuelo | Asian Fusion | Puebla City | ✅ |
| Restaurante Casareyna | Mexican | Puebla City | ✅ |
| Semitas "Beto" | Mexican | Puebla City | ✅ |
| Vica | Mexican | Atlixco | ✅ |
| Reference(s) | | | |

== Quintana Roo ==
As of the 2026 Michelin Guide, there are 4 restaurants in Quintana Roo with a Bib Gourmand rating.

Key
| ✅ | Indicates a restaurant with a Michelin Bib Gourmand designation |

| Name | Cuisine | Location | 2024 | 2025 | 2026 |
|---|---|---|---|---|---|
| Axiote Cocina de Mexico | Mexican | Playa del Carmen | ✅ | ✅ | ✅ |
| Cetli | Mexican | Tulum | ✅ | ✅ | ✅ |
| Mestixa | Asian Fusion / Mexican | Tulum | ✅ | ✅ | ✅ |
| Punta Corcho | Mexican | Puerto Morelos | ✅ | ✅ | ✅ |
| Reference(s) | | | | | |

== Yucatan ==
As of the 2026 Michelin Guide, there are 3 restaurants in Yucatan with a Bib Gourmand rating. Michelin first began rating restaurants in the state in 2026.

Key
| ✅ | Indicates a restaurant with a Michelin Bib Gourmand designation |

| Name | Cuisine | Location | 2026 |
|---|---|---|---|
| Pancho Maiz | Mexican | Mérida | ✅ |
| Pueblo Pibil | Mexican | Tixkokob | ✅ |
| Taquerías Kisín | Mexican | Mérida | ✅ |
| Reference(s) | | | |

== See also ==
- List of Michelin-starred restaurants in Mexico
- List of restaurants in Mexico
