= Norma Listman and Saqib Keval =

Chefs in Mexico

Norma Listman and Saqib Keval are chefs and restaurateurs in Mexico City.

== Early lives ==
Listman grew up in Texcoco. When she was 21, she moved to the San Francisco Bay area to work in the art world. She worked on a project that explored the final hours before the transition of California from Mexico to the US and recreated a feast given by General Mariano Vallejo. She had an epiphany, recognizing the power of food, and decided to switch careers.

Keval was born and grew up in Northern California; his "family are Kutchis, Indian immigrants from East Africa". His parents moved to the United States from Ethiopia and Kenya, where his ancestors had moved 200 years ago. He has a degree in French post-colonial literature. In 2011 he started People's Kitchen Collective, which he describes as an effort to "envision a reality where food is being used as a tool for building community and not just exploiting workers".

== Restaurants ==
Listman and Keval own Masala y Maíz in the Centro neighborhood of Mexico City, Mexico. The restaurant blends Mexican and Indian flavors, focussing on mestizaje, a concept they describe as a counterpoint to that of fusion cuisine: mestizaje dishes make sense in both cuisines.

The two focus on decolonization of the foods of the global south. Stephen Satterfield says, "They are activists who use food as their medium." An example is camarones pa'pelar, a dish of prawns cooked with vanilla, salsa macha, and lime which includes no sweet ingredients. They also address issues of racism, sexism, exploitation and abuse within the restaurant industry. According to the LA Times, "Listman...explores the history, flavor and politics of corn".

The two met working together, and then Listman heard Keval speak at an event at the Museum of the African Diaspora and was impressed with his discussion of "using food as a tool of resistance". The two began dating, although she moved back to Mexico City. She was asked to cater a dinner in Mexico City, and he offered to come help, and during their shopping and meal preparation they discovered their cooking styles were complementary.

When Listman was offered an opportunity to create a restaurant, she asked Keval to come in; his first reaction was reluctance to participate in an industry built on exploitation and abuse. He eventually decided that he was willing to open a restaurant that was "a platform for change" and moved to Mexico City. They rejected the European brigade system as exploitative and abusive of workers. They initially found trying to protect workers meant working long hours themselves without making a profit.

The restaurant opened in October 2017 and was closed by authorities in April 2018, and a bribe was requested. They didn't want to pay the bribe. Another restaurateur, Scarlett Lindeman of Cicatriz, offered to let them cook in her space, and they attracted attention with "Donuts Against Corruption". Other local restaurants supported them with similar offers. They were eventually able to reopen in September 2018. According to Listman, "the donuts became an important icon of resistance", and the reopened restaurant gained international attention.

They pushed control down to the restaurant workers to "upend the hierarchy".

== Recognition ==
- 2024 awarded Michelin Bib Gourmand
- 2025 awarded one Michelin Star
- The couple was featured on Chef's Table in 2024.

== Personal life ==
Listman and Keval are married.
