= ICÚ (restaurant) =

Restaurant in Puerto Vallarta, Jalisco, Mexico

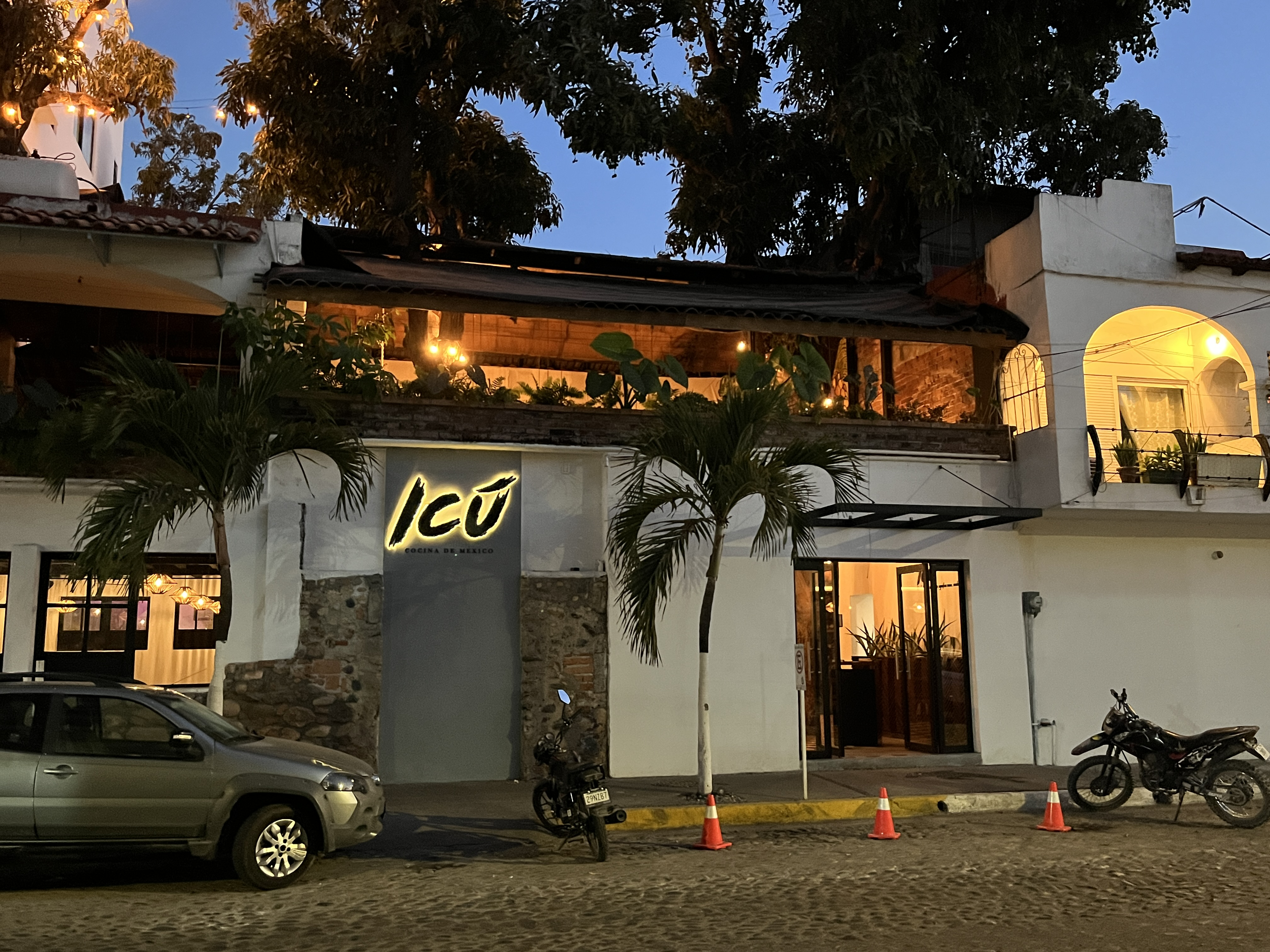
- The restaurant's exterior in 2023

Restaurant information
- Owner: Mauricio Leal
- Chef: Mauricio Leal
- Food type: Mexican
- Location: Puerto Vallarta, Jalisco, Mexico
- Website: restauranteicu.com

ICÚ is a Mexican restaurant in Zona Romántica, Puerto Vallarta, Jalisco, Mexico. It has received Bib Gourmand status in the Michelin Guide. Mauricio Leal is the chef and owner. The menu includes dishes with the ingredients beans, corn, and pumpkin, as well as mole.

== See also ==
- List of Mexican restaurants
- List of Michelin Bib Gourmand restaurants in Mexico
- List of restaurants in Mexico
