= Teatro Metropólitan =

Theater in Mexico City

Coordinates: 19°26′00″N 99°08′49″W

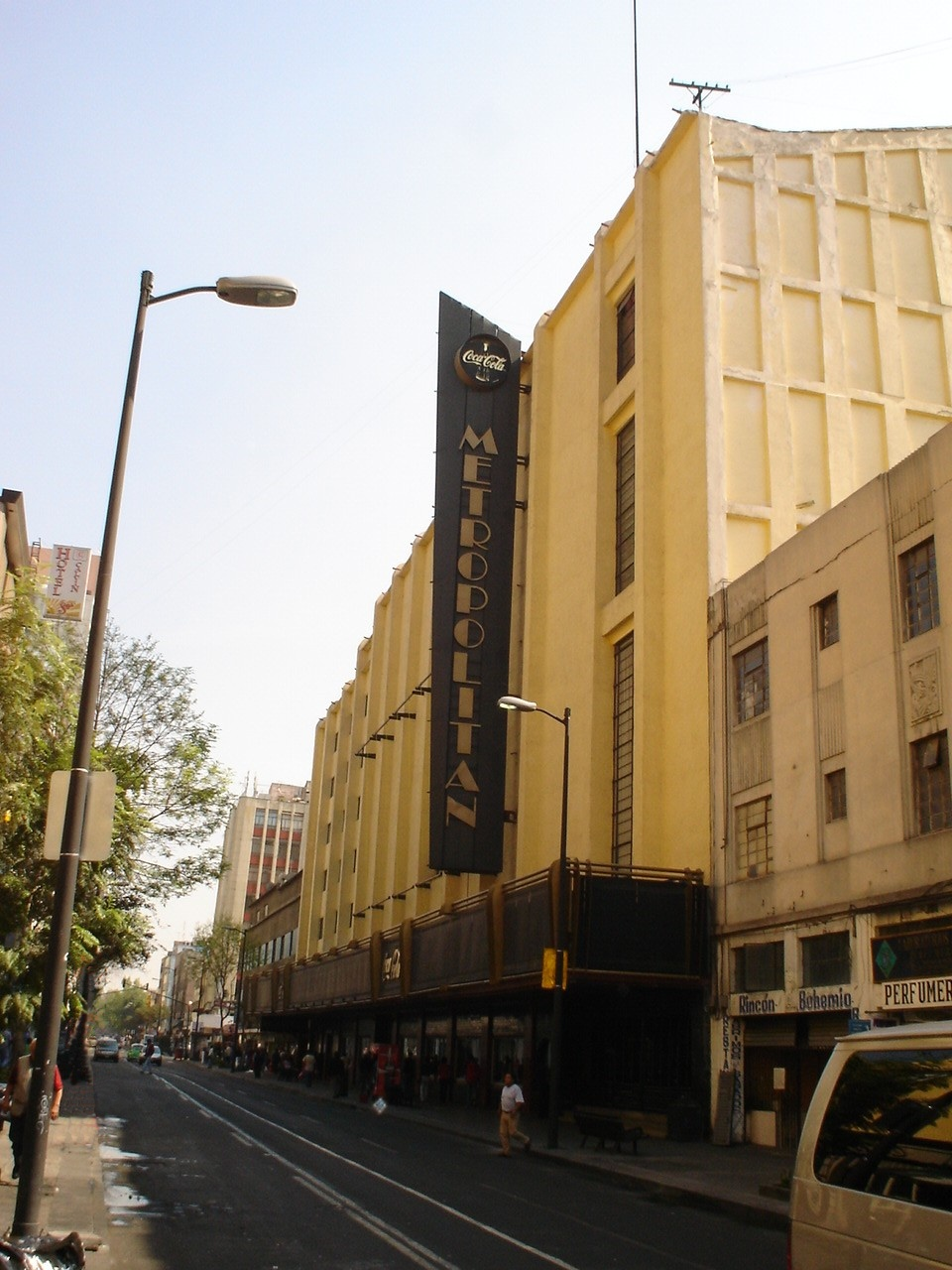
Teatro Metropólitan.

The Teatro Metropólitan is a theater in Mexico City. It was previously known as the Cine Metropólitan, and was built as a movie palace. The architect was Pedro Gorozpe E. with interior decorations by Aurelio G. Mendoza.

The theater opened on 8 September 1943 with the Argentinian film "Dieciséis años" (1943), starring María Duval and Alicia Barrié. Seating capacities were later reduced and given as 3,627 in 1955 and 3,005 in 1971.

It closed as a cinema in the early 90's and was renovated in 1995, re-opening on 18 December 1996 as the Teatro Metropólitan, a live show venue staging mainly rock concerts.

Teatro Metropólitan is a sponsor of Mexico City's National Jazz Festival. It was also the site for the annual Premios TV y Novelas ceremonies in the 1980s and 1990s. The theatre has a capacity of 3,165 people.

The theatre is located in downtown Mexico City, at Independencia No. 90, Col. Centro, one block south of the Alameda Central. Juárez (line number 3) and Hidalgo (line number 2) are the nearest Metro stations.
