= Esquina Común =

Restaurant in Mexico City, Mexico

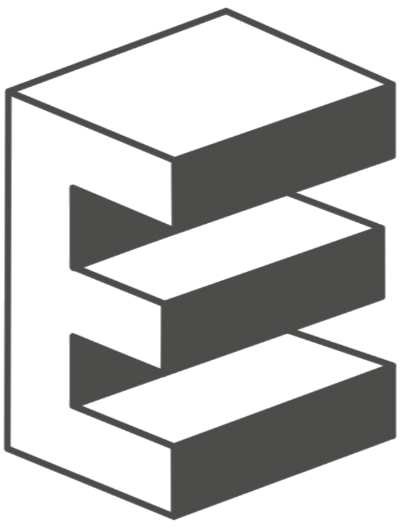

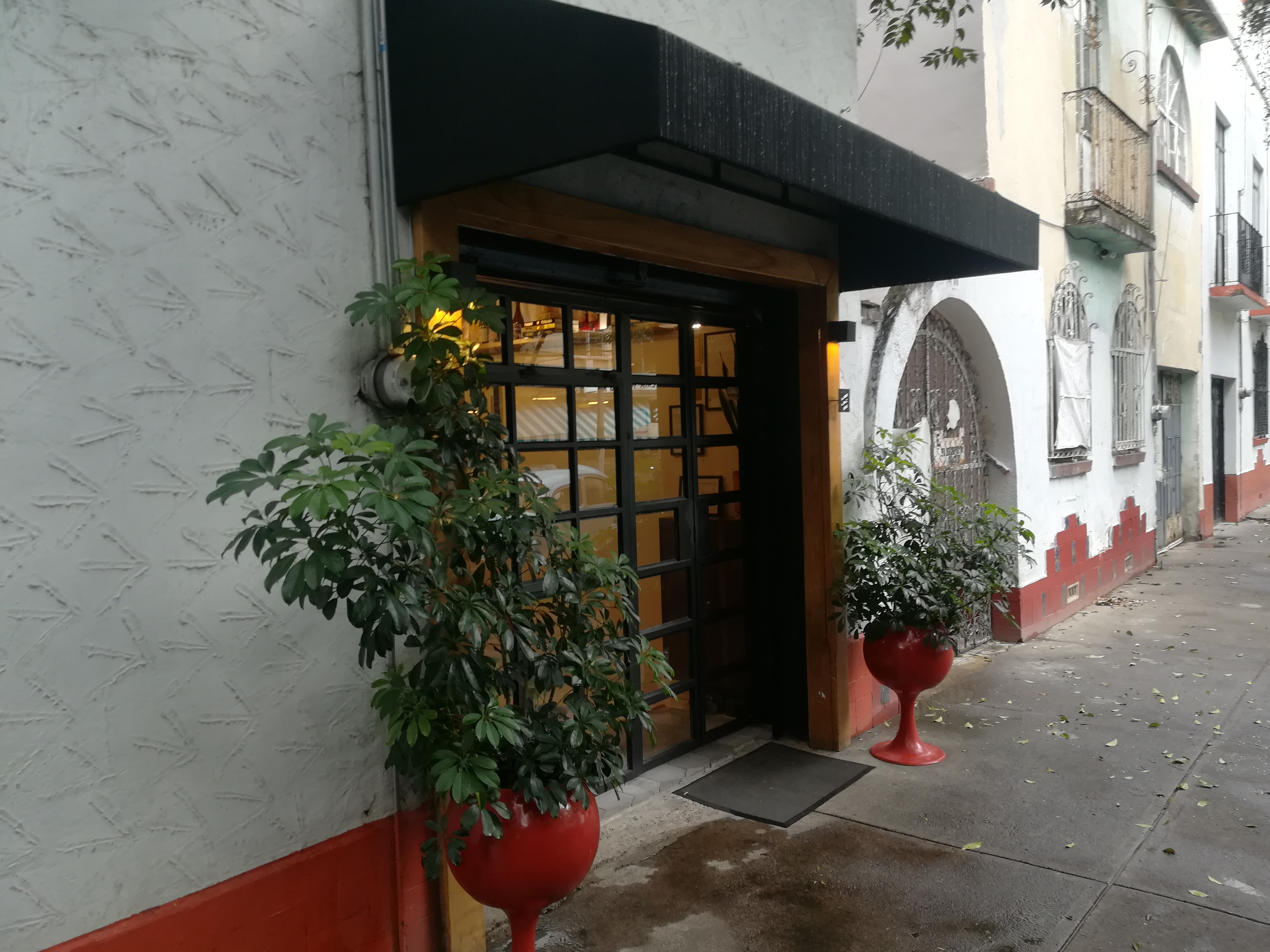
- The entrance in 2026
- Interactive map of Esquina Común

Restaurant information
- Established: 2021
- Owners: Ana Dolores González; Carlos Pérez-Puelles
- Manager: Carlos Pérez-Puelles
- Chef: Ana Dolores González
- Food type: Mexican; Spanish
- Rating: (Michelin Guide, 2024)
- Location: Fernando Montes de Oca 86, Condesa, Cuauhtémoc, Mexico City, 06140, Mexico
- Coordinates: 19°24′50″N 99°10′36″W
- Seating capacity: 30
- Reservations: Yes
- Website: Esquina Común on Instagram

Esquina Común (Note: transl. "Common corner") is a restaurant in Colonia Condesa, Cuauhtémoc, Mexico City. It is co-owned by chef Ana Dolores González and her partner, Carlos Pérez-Puelles. It was first founded in their leased department in the Roma neighborhood in 2021. After being reviewed by The New York Times, the restaurant became popular.

They relocated between 2022 and 2023 to the Condesa neighborhood after their landlord attempted to raise their rent upon discovering they ran a business. Described by reviewers as a clandestine terrace, Esquina Común serves Mexican and Spanish cuisines. In 2024, Esquina Común was awarded one Michelin star in the first Michelin Guide covering restaurants in Mexico.

== Description ==
Esquina Común is a Mexican and Spanish restaurant that serves seasonal menus. It is replaced every two months and offers a seven-course menu akin to tasting menus. The restaurant's seating capacity has space for 30 people, and diners are required to make reservations via Instagram. After their reservation is confirmed, they are informed of the location formally. Esquina Común is only open on weekends. In an interview with Mariana Camacho, González said that the menu included a stewed short rib sope, cobia ceviche, mole, and fried chicken. María José Ferrant named other options like fish pâté with squash blossom pesto, plantain croquettes stuffed with quesillo, and beef in plum juice with jocoque. José R. Ralat noted that the restaurant served chorizo croquettes and vermicelli with wild-mushroom.

== History ==
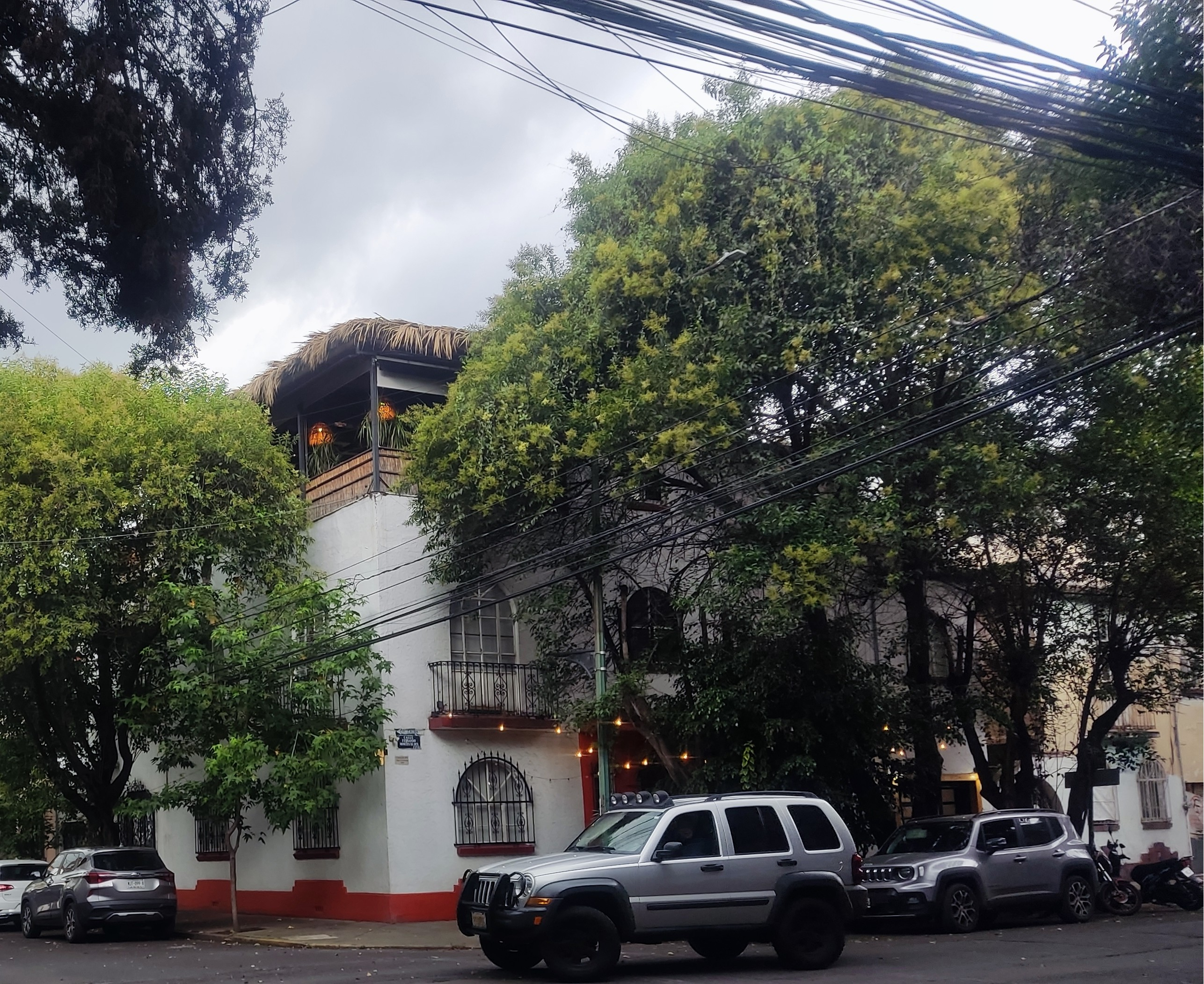
The restaurant is located on the rooftop terrace

Esquina Común was founded by Mexican chef Ana Dolores González and her Spanish partner, Carlos Pérez-Puelles, in late 2021. González previously worked at Expendio de Maíz, a restaurant in Mexico City, and in Peru. The restaurant could serve up to 14 customers and it was established in the living room of a leased department in the Roma neighborhood before the terrace was furnished. González's mother assisted her in the kitchen. The restaurant gained notoriety after a New York Times review titled "A Homey Restaurant Tucked Inside a Mexico City Apartment" by Michael Snyder.

Between 2022 and 2023, their landlord discovered that they were running a business and tripled the rent. González and Pérez-Puelles relocated to the Condesa neighborhood, to Fernando Montes de Oca Street. Both invested most of their savings to remodel the new location. Ignacio Medina described it as a "half-clandestine restaurant on the terrace of a coworking space at a crossroads in Condesa [with a] covered third floor that looks out onto the canopy of trees that shade the street".

== Reception ==
In his review for Siete Caníbales, Medina approved the ceviche but criticized the chicken breast. Coco Marett of Tatler Asia described that "[the] plates are pure magic, a mash-up of influences from Mexican to Mediterranean". Michele Lagalla of Cocina y Vino commented that the space is surreptitious and the plates are austere, detailed, and flavorful. Esquina Común was defined by the Travel + Leisure En Español editorial team as a restaurant that embodies modern Mexican cuisine, praising the atmosphere, the service, the tasting menu options, the catch of the day, and the wine selection.

When the Michelin Guide debuted in Mexico in 2024, it awarded eighteen restaurants with Michelin stars. Esquina Común received one star, meaning "high-quality cooking, worth a stop". The guide added: "[t]he covered rooftop setting is enhanced with bountiful greenery and a lovely, relaxed vibe" and was "[s]tyled like a tasting menu and portioned for two," adding that "[the] dishes [were] impressive".

Esquina Común, along with six other Michelin-starred restaurants in Mexico City, was honored by Martí Batres, the head of the Mexico City government. He presented the chefs with an onyx statuette as a token of appreciation for their role in promoting tourism in the city. The statuette's design is inspired by the pre-Hispanic sculpture The Young Woman of Amajac, in recognition of the significant contributions of indigenous women to national and international gastronomy.

== See also ==
- List of Mexican restaurants
- List of Spanish restaurants
