= La Cocina de Doña Esthela =

Restaurant in Valle de Guadalupe, Baja California

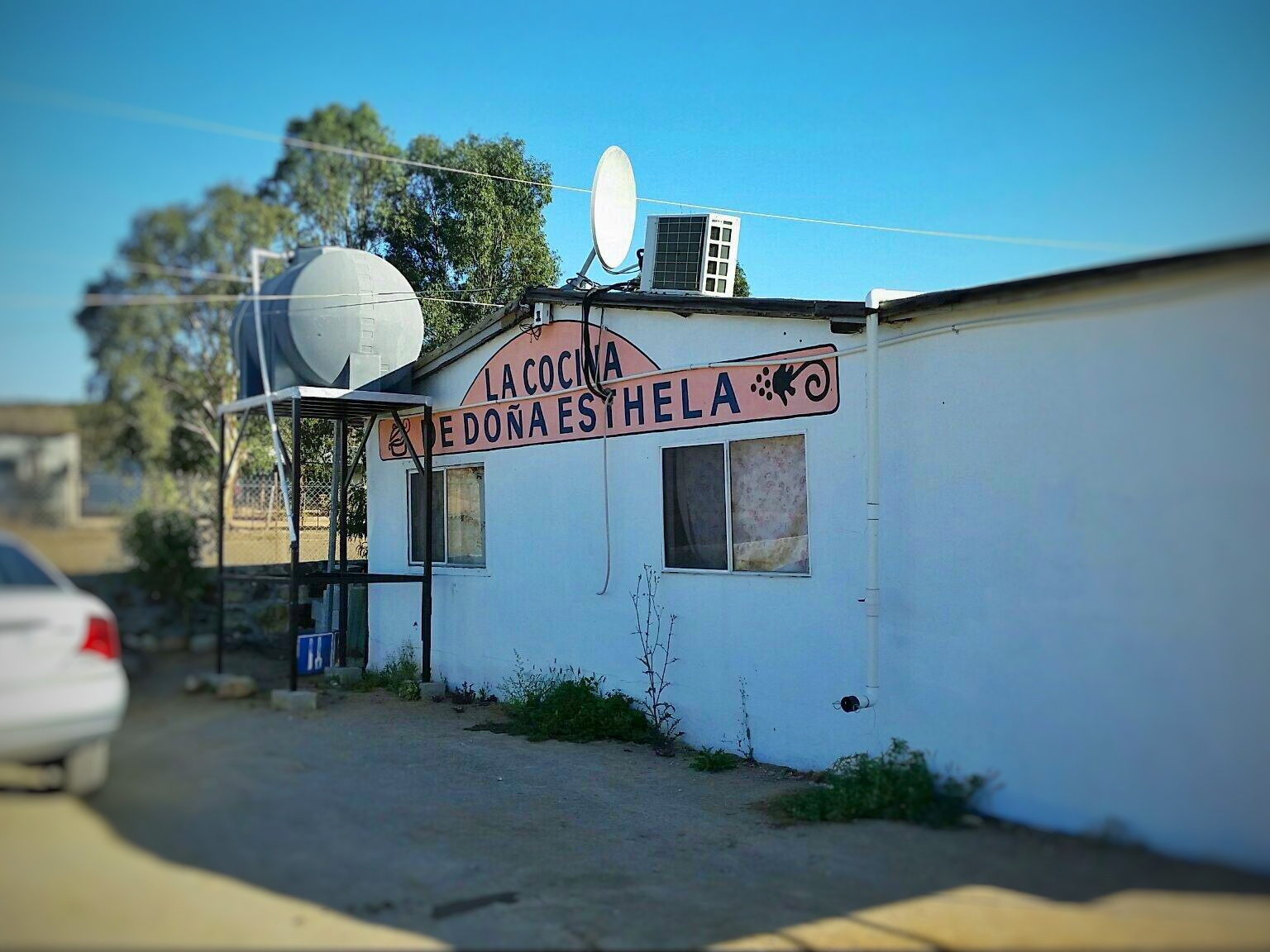
- The restaurant in 2015
- Interactive map of La Cocina de Doña Esthela

Restaurant information
- Owner: Esthela Bueno
- Food type: Mexican
- Rating: Bib Gourmand (Michelin Guide, 2024)
- Location: Rancho San Marcos el Porvenir S/N, Valle de Guadalupe, 22755, Mexico
- Coordinates: 32°01′10″N 116°39′48″W
- Reservations: No

La Cocina de Doña Esthela (Note: Latin American Spanish pronunciation: [la koˈsina ðe ˈðoɲa ezˈðela].) is a Mexican restaurant in Valle de Guadalupe, in Ensenada Municipality, Baja California. It is owned by Esthela Bueno, and the restaurant received the Best Breakfast Award from FoodieHub in 2015, which gave fame to the business. In 2024, the restaurant received a Bib Gourmand recommendation in the first Michelin Guide covering restaurants in Mexico.

== Description ==
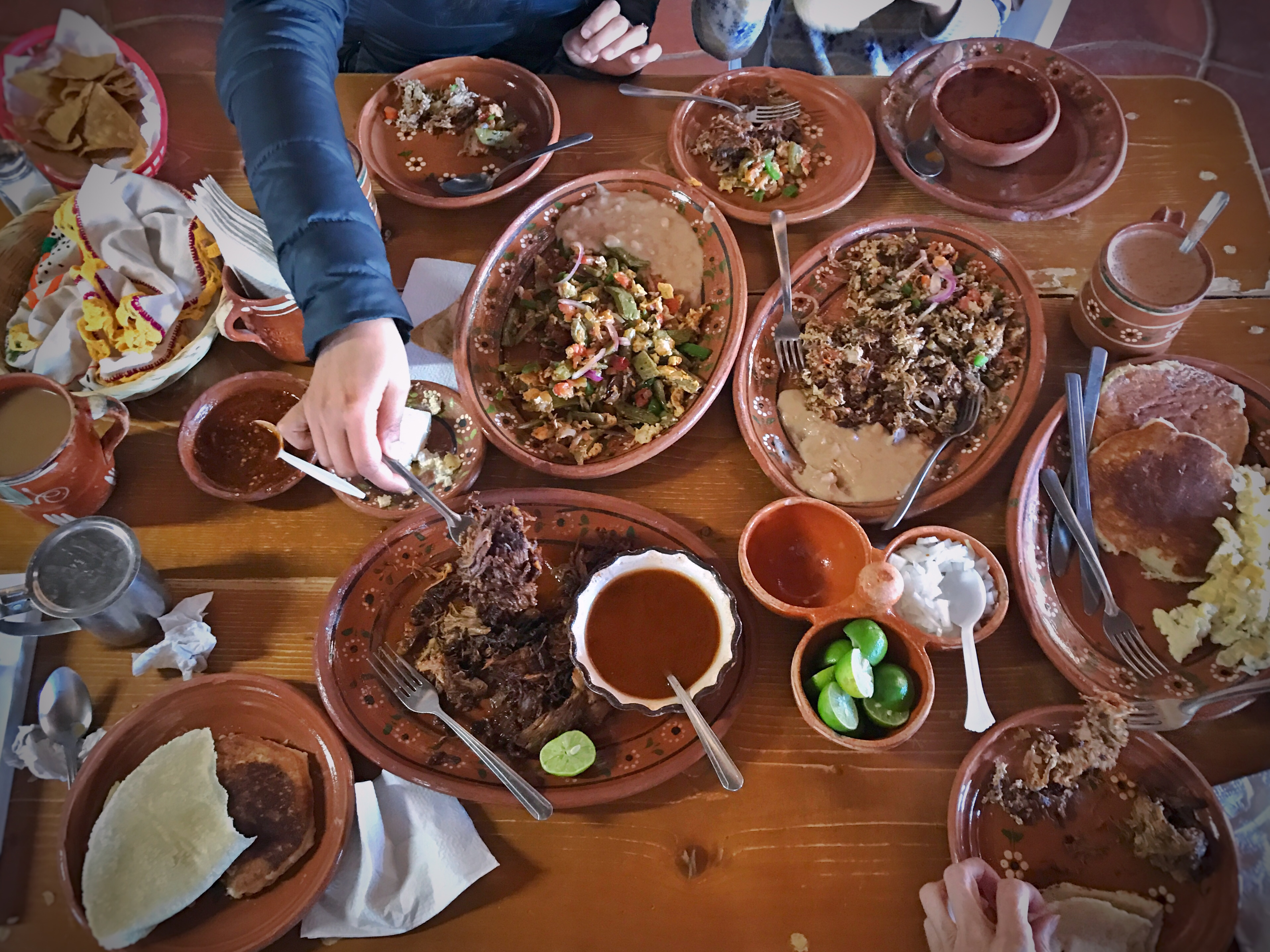
Sample breakfast served at the restaurant

La Cocina de Doña Esthela serves Mexican cuisine. The signature dish is the machacado con huevo, which is seasoned only with grain salt and served with refried beans and tortillas. Regarding the borrego tatemado (slow-cooked lamb), the chef explains it is cooked underground in a traditional clay oven, which allows the protein to cook in its own juices, resulting in a crispy and tender texture. Other dishes include cornbread, huevos con chorizo (scrambled eggs mixed with chorizo), squash empanada and corn hot cakes.

La Cocina de Doña Esthela is located in a ranch in Valle de Guadalupe, a region known for its wineries and farm-to-table restaurants. It has wooden tables, and does not take reservations, so diners take turns.

== History ==
Blanca Esthela Martínez Bueno is originally from the state of Sinaloa. She moved to Baja California in 2010 after she and her husband were offered the opportunity to produce cheese at a ranch. She subsequently prepared and sold breakfasts for children at the same schools attended by her own children.

During the filming of the telenovela Cuando me enamoro, cast and crew members used to purchase her bread and tamales. She then started cooking burritos. She later established La Cocina de Doña Esthela, which initially had two tables and could serve up to eight guests at a time, while her comal could heat only two tortillas simultaneously.

In 2015, she received a call from the staff of FoodieHub informing her that the restaurant received an award for the world's best breakfast. Initially, she believed the call might be an attempt at extortion, but the next day multiple journalists arrived at the restaurant to conduct interviews. The machacado con huevo was selected from 4,000 nominations in 150 cities.

== Reception ==
Gowri Chandra wrote for Food & Wine that La Cocina de Doña Esthela is an option for a roadside stop, which serves food equally offered at any Mexican household, however, "that's kind of the point".

In 2024, La Cocina de Doña Esthela received a Bib Gourmand recommendation in the first Michelin Guide covering Mexico. The inspectors noted that it is a highly visited restaurant and describing the food as "dialed-in cooking with hearty portions". It has been visited by celebrity chefs, including Gordon Ramsay and Anthony Bourdain, who told her that "he wanted to see [her] grow". A reviewer for OC Weekly enjoyed the barbecued lamb, calling it "confirmation of excellence".

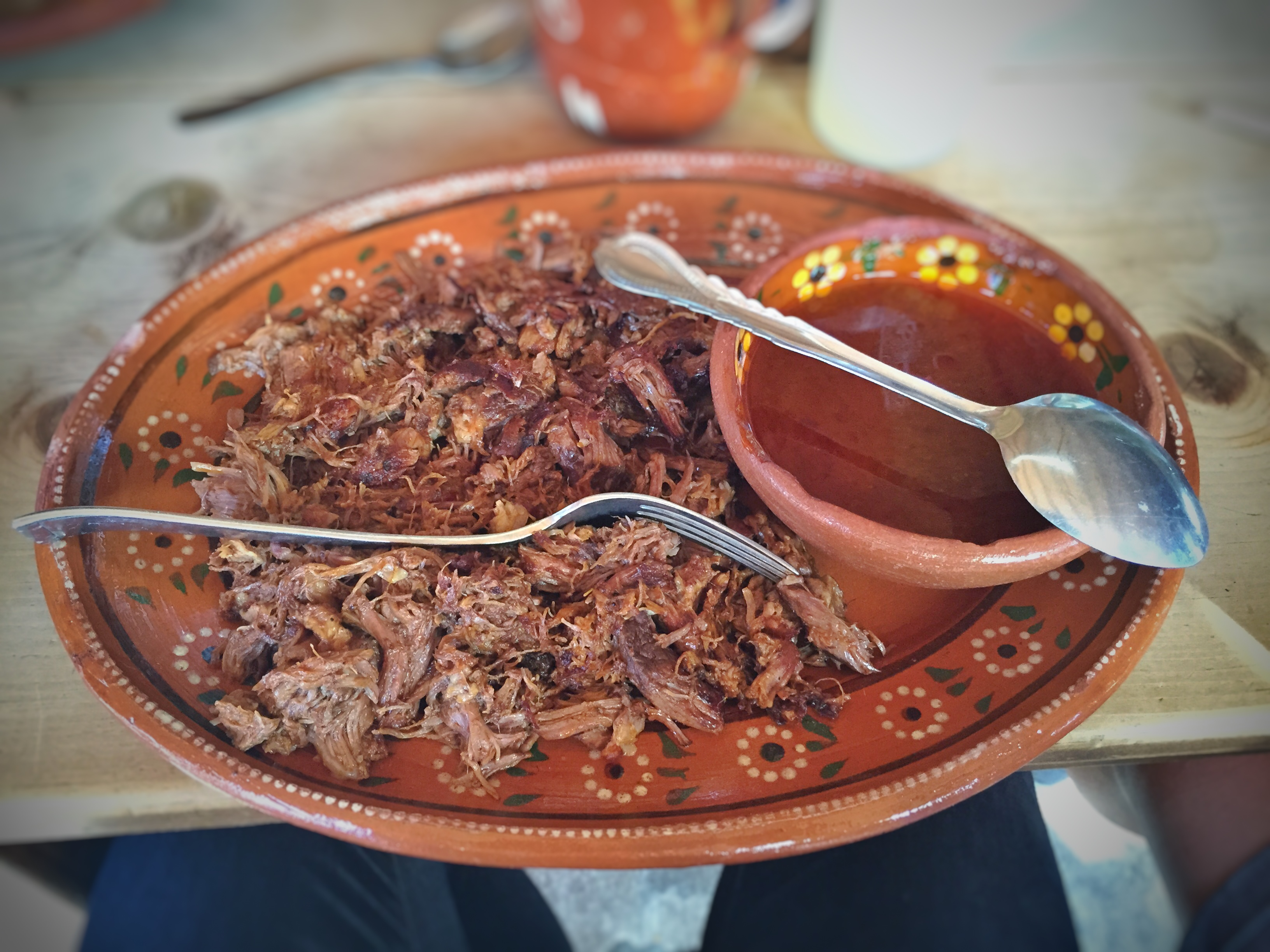
Borrego tatemado

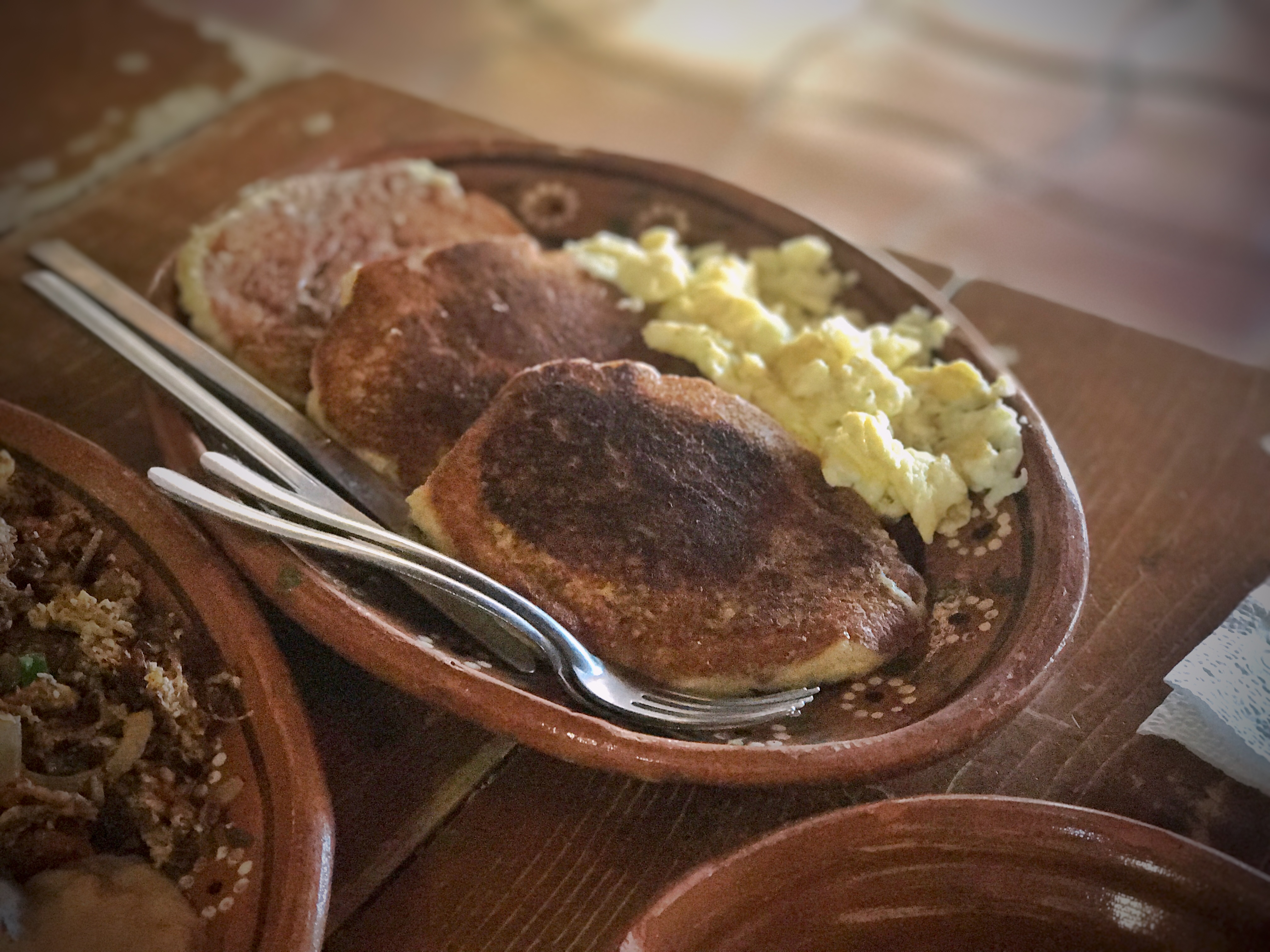
Corn hot cakes

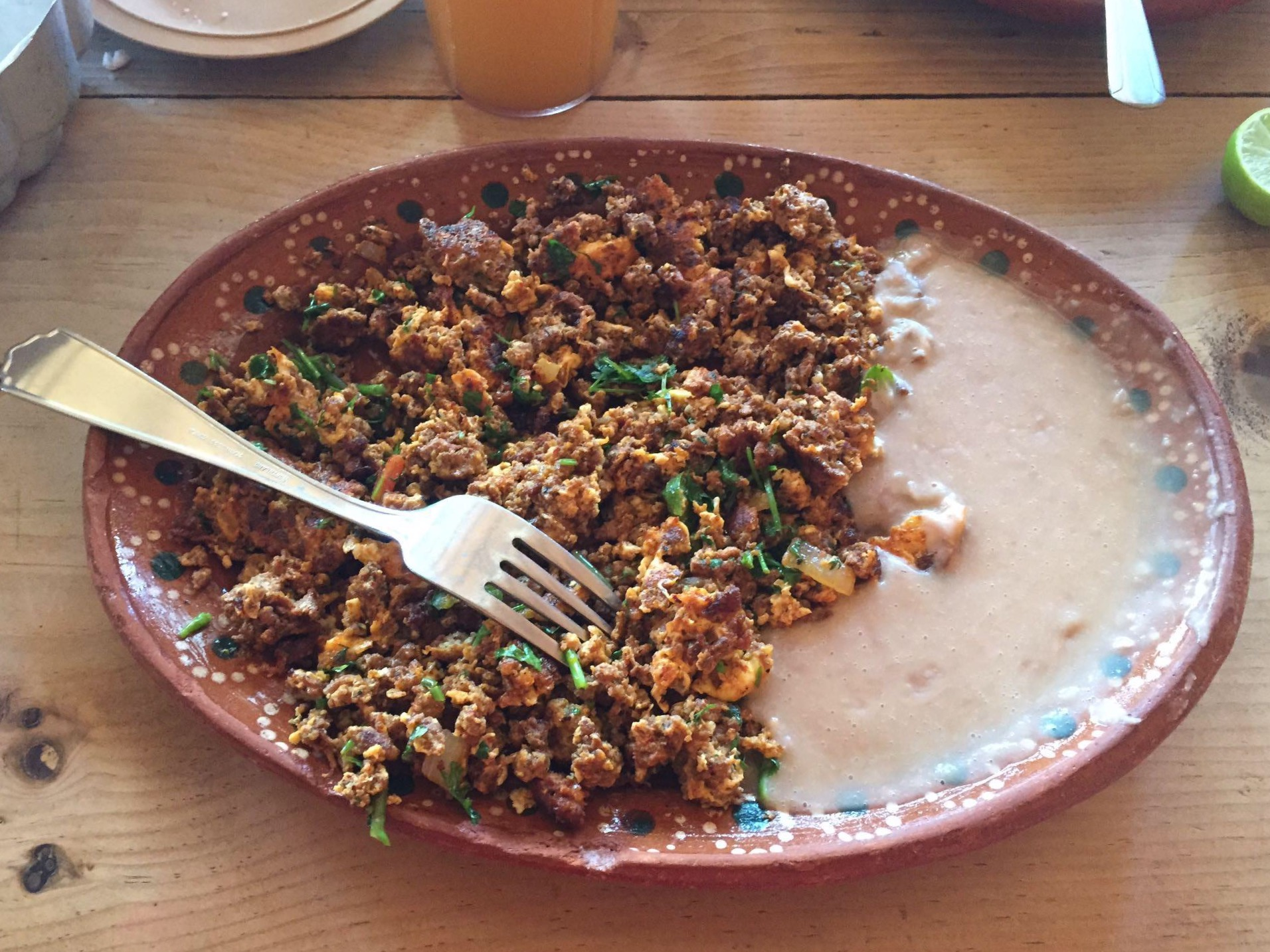
Huevos con chorizo

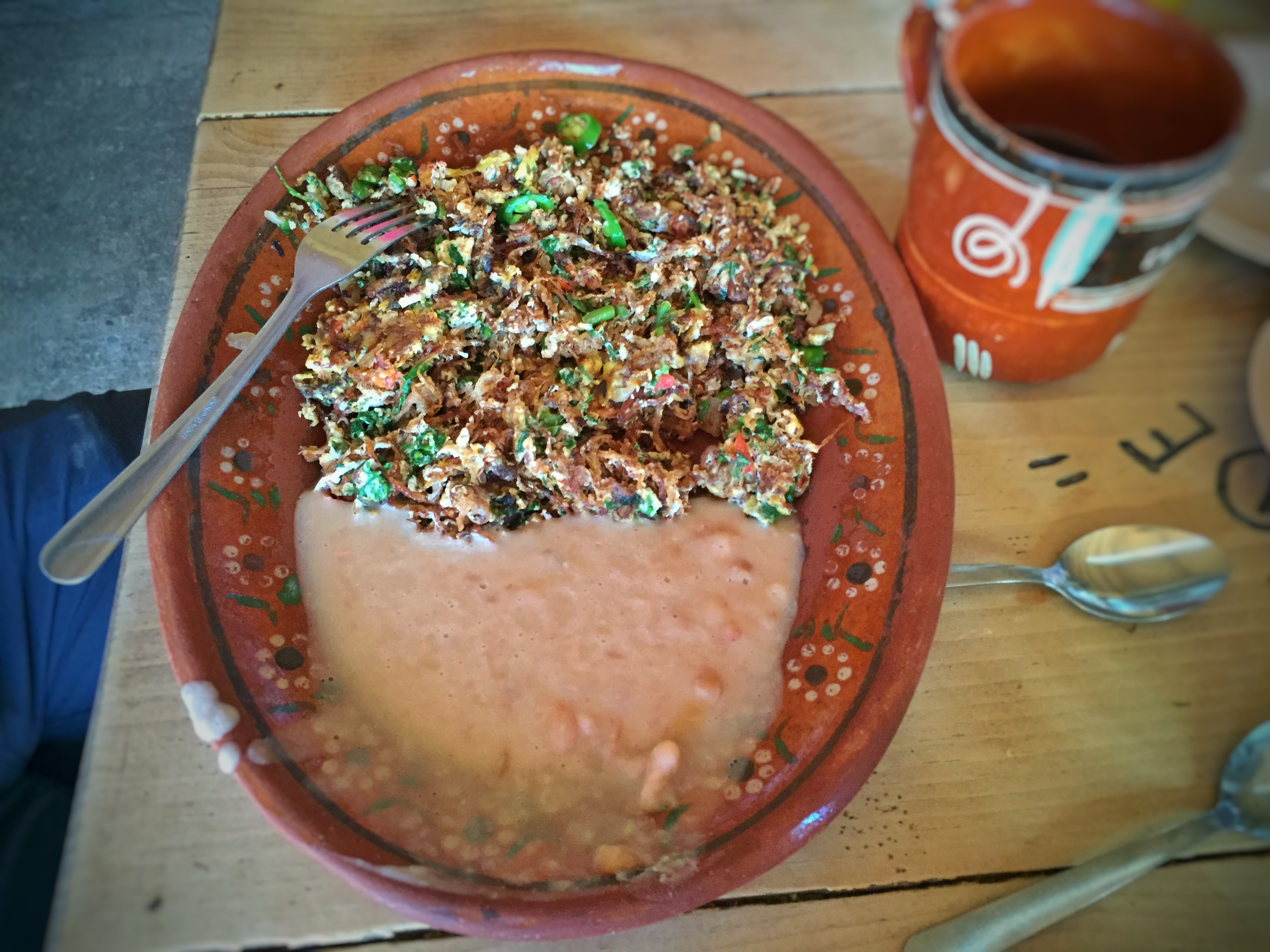
Machacado con huevo

== See also ==
- Lunario (restaurant), a nearby restaurant
