= Expendio de Maíz =

Mexican restaurant in Mexico City, Mexico

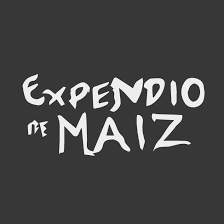

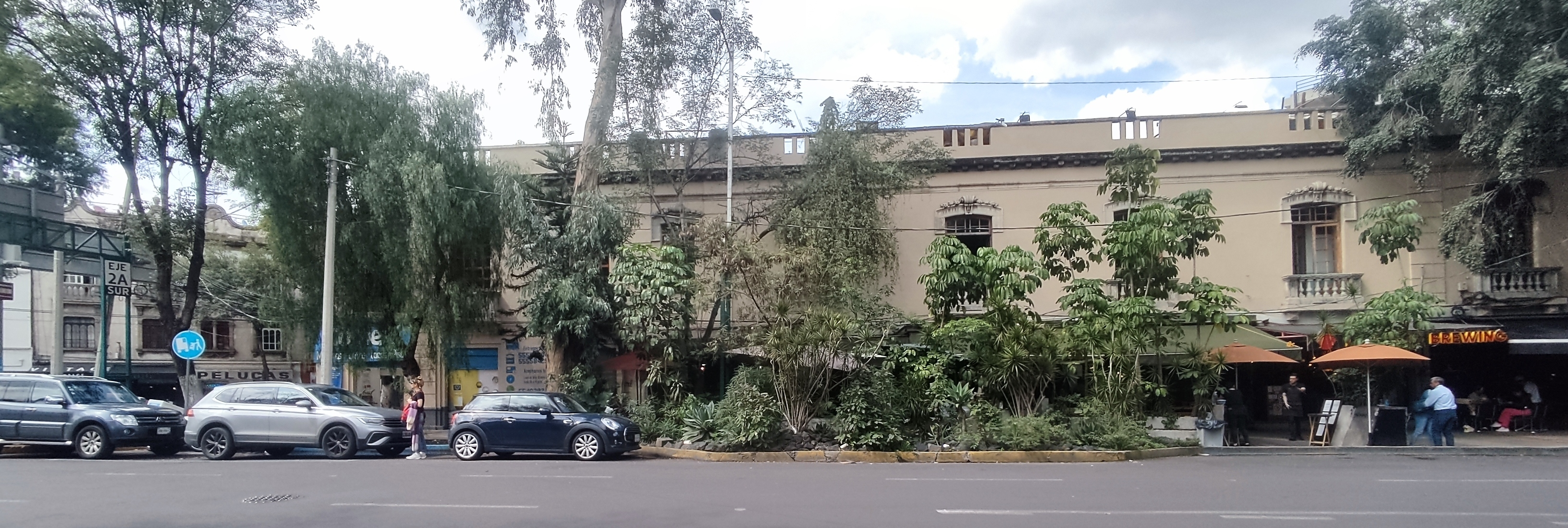
- The restaurant's block along Avenida Yucatán. Expendio de Maíz is found in the middle of the image.
- Interactive map of Expendio de Maíz

Restaurant information
- Established: April 2018
- Owner: Jesús Salas Tornés
- Chef: Ana Dolores González (former)
- Food type: Antojito
- Rating: (Michelin Guide, 2025)
- Location: Yucatán 84, Roma, Cuauhtémoc, Mexico City, Mexico City, 06700, Mexico
- Coordinates: 19°24′51″N 99°09′45.5″W
- Seating capacity: 4 communal tables
- Reservations: No
- Website: Expendio de Maíz on Instagram

Expendio de Maíz, alternatively known as Expendio de Maíz Sin Nombre, is a Mexican restaurant in Mexico City. It was founded in 2018 by the chef Jesús Salas Tornés in Colonia Roma, in the Cuauhtémoc borough.

The restaurant offers a casual, communal dining experience centered on Mexican street food and maize-based dishes. With no set menu, no reservations, no servers, and cash-only payments, guests are seated at one of four shared tables. In the open kitchen, cooks prepare surprise dishes tailored to each diner's preferences and dietary needs, checking in to offer more food until patrons are satisfied.

In 2024, Expendio de Maíz received a Bib Gourmand distinction in the first Michelin Guide covering restaurants in Mexico. The following year, it was awarded its first Michelin star.

== Description ==
The restaurant serves only Mexican street food (locally known as antojitos), has no fixed menu, accepts only cash payments, and does not take reservations. Diners are seated at one of the four available communal tables; if the restaurant is full, diners take turns. The restaurant, which has an open kitchen, serves maize-dishes, including tortillas, tacos, sopes, and gorditas. Cooks, who also serve as waitstaff, ask diners about any dietary restrictions and food preferences; they will use this information to prepare surprise plates. They then offer additional dishes throughout the meal until guests indicate they are satisfied.

The building's interior design is based on a Mexican rural kitchen. The eatery lacks signs or a dining area and only contains a volcanic rock kitchen with a few stools and benches surrounding a clay comal. The restaurant primarily uses ingredients grown in milpas, including corn, beans, field peas, wild amaranth, and squash. Grasshoppers may also be served. Ingredients are seasonal and locally sourced.

The ingredients are seasonal and depend on what their suppliers have available. Although there is no set menu, past offerings have included tacos filled with fresh cheese, hoja santa, and squash blossom, or a blue corn tortilla topped with avocado, ants, and salsa. Expendio de Maíz also offers a taco piled with whole nixtamalized corn kernels, which has become its signature dish. It is fried in coconut butter and topped with hoja santa, cheese, and edible flowers. The restaurant serves aguas frescas, coffee, fermented drinks, and corn beer, as well as masa and tortillas to go.

== History ==
Jesús Salas Tornés opened Expendio de Maíz in April 2018 on Avenida Yucatán, Colonia Roma, along with his associates Paulino Martínez Acra and Ludwig Godefroy, the latter of whom was its interior designer. The restaurant had no name when it was first opened, becoming known as "expendio de maíz sin nombre" (lit. transl. "nameless maize stand"). According to Tornés, he wanted to create an "unpretentious place" inspired by the rural Mexican cuisine. Martínez offered Tornés space next to his taquería, El Parnita. Originally, Tornés decorated the space with papayas and bananas he brought from his hometown Ayutla de los Libres, Guerrero.

During the first year of operation, he had to work with a black stone metate, grinding maize he had nixtamalized into masa. The restaurant primarily attracted foreign visitors. During its opening phase, it used about 400 kilograms (880 lb) of nixtamalized corn each month; by 2020, that amount had grown to over 10,000 kilograms (22,000 lb). The Mexican chef Ana Dolores González became head chef in April 2019, contributing various dishes, including the restaurant's signature dish, which she had created by gathering limited ingredients at the end of her shift.

== Reception ==
A Time Out reviewer gave Expendio de Maíz a four-star rating, saying that the restaurant "is not just another gimmicky origin-cuisine spot" in Colonia Roma. The World's 50 Best Restaurants described the establishment as a blend of a street food stall and a fashionable urban eatery. Naomi Tomky of Condé Nast Traveler suggested the eatery as a good spot for small, unhurried groups. Daniel Hernandez of Los Angeles Times considered that although several restaurants in Mexico City honor rural Mexican cooking, none "has ever translated the spontaneity and ordered chaos of a country kitchen to the city so faithfully".

Le Fooding and Mastercard awarded Expendio de Maíz the 2019 Best New Bistro title for Mexico City. The restaurant received a Bib Gourmand rating from the Michelin Guide in 2024, meaning "exceptionally good food at moderate prices". In 2025, the guide brought the restaurant to one Michelin star, denoting "high-quality cooking, worth a stop". In this regard, Tornés said, "in the past, the lists were dominated by projects without a local narrative. Today, there's more openness to hearing what we have to say".
