= Juárez metro station =

Mexico City metro station

Juárez
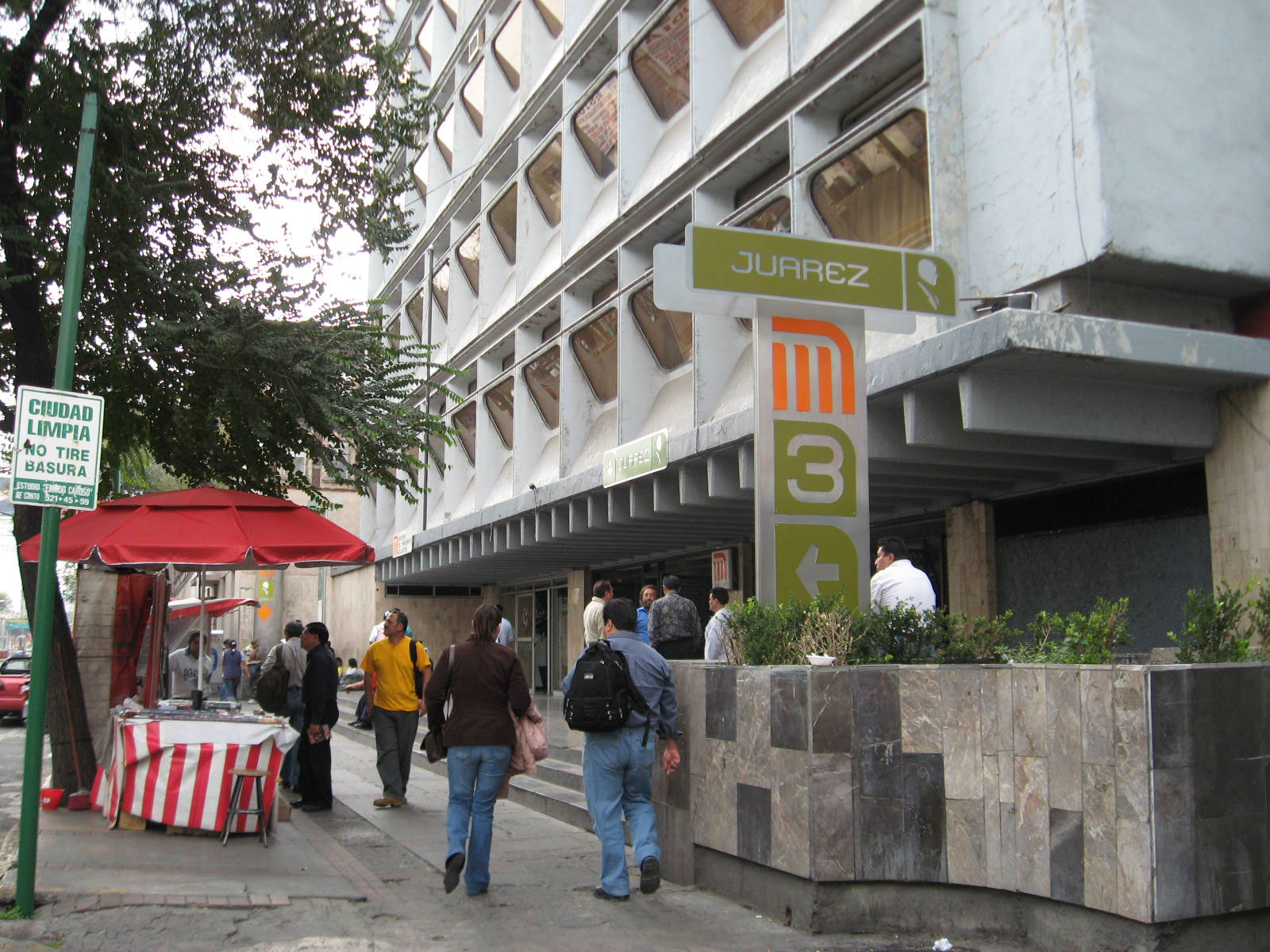
- Entrance to Metro Juarez on Balderas Street

General information
- Location: Balderas street Centro, Cuauhtémoc; Mexico City; Mexico
- Coordinates: 19°25′59″N 99°08′52″W
- System: Mexico City Metro
- Platforms: 2 side platforms
- Tracks: 2
- Connections: Juárez; Juárez

Construction
- Structure type: Underground
- Platform levels: 1
- Parking: No
- Cycle facilities: No
- Accessible: Yes

History
- Opened: 20 November 1970; 55 years ago

Passengers
- 2025: 4,729,441 ▼8.95%
- Rank: 112/195

Services
| Preceding station | Mexico City Metro | Following station |
|---|---|---|
| Hidalgo toward Indios Verdes | Line 3 | Balderas toward Universidad |
Route map
Location
- Location within Mexico City
- Area map

Juárez is a metro station on the Mexico City Metro. It is located in the Cuauhtémoc borough of Mexico City.

== Name and iconography ==
The station logo depicts the bust of Benito Juárez (1806-1872), a Mexican lawyer and politician of Zapotec origin from Oaxaca who served five terms as the president of Mexico: 1858–1861 as interim, then 1861–1865, 1865–1867, 1867–1871 and 1871–1872 as constitutional president. This station's name, along with Metro Guelatao, refers to the Mexican politician and is located close to Juárez Avenue. The station opened on 20 November 1970, and has facilities for the handicapped.

== General information ==
Juárez serves the Centro neighborhood, near the downtown area of the city. It is located on Balderas Avenue, and the walk from the station to the important Eje Central Lázaro Cárdenas Avenue has many specialty stores.

=== Ridership ===
Annual passenger ridership (Note: The data here is limited to the most recent ten years to avoid excessive listings; earlier figures can be found in this page's history or on the Mexico City Metro website. To calculate the average daily ridership, the annual total is divided by 365 days (366 in leap years), with decimals omitted from the result. Each station per line is ranked individually, as the system counts transfer stations separately. The percentage change is calculated automatically using the data from the current year and the previous year.)
| Year | Ridership | Average daily | Rank | % change | Ref. |
|---|---|---|---|---|---|
| 2025 | 4,729,441 | 12,957 | 112/195 | −8.95% |
| 2024 | 5,194,260 | 14,191 | 86/195 | +3.68% |
| 2023 | 5,009,931 | 13,725 | 93/195 | +15.14% |
| 2022 | 4,351,149 | 11,920 | 98/195 | +47.16% |
| 2021 | 2,956,795 | 8,100 | 111/195 | −15.48% |
| 2020 | 3,498,216 | 9,557 | 107/195 | −44.65% |
| 2019 | 6,320,737 | 17,317 | 105/195 | −1.25% |
| 2018 | 6,400,618 | 17,535 | 102/195 | −1.46% |
| 2017 | 6,495,647 | 17,796 | 100/195 | −5.04% |
| 2016 | 6,840,125 | 18,688 | 94/195 | +0.80% |

== Nearby ==
- Teatro Metropólitan, theatre.
- Museo de Arte Popular, popular art museum.
- Newspaper Milenio headquarters.

== Exits ==
- East: Balderas Street and Art. 123 Street, Centro
- West: Balderas Street and Independencia Avenue, Centro
