= List of The Blacklist characters =

The Blacklist is an American crime drama television series that premiered on NBC on September 23, 2013. Raymond "Red" Reddington (James Spader), a former government agent turned high-profile criminal, who had eluded capture for decades, voluntarily surrenders to the FBI, offering to cooperate on capturing a list of criminals who are virtually impossible to catch. He insists on working with a rookie profiler by the name of Elizabeth Keen (Megan Boone). The show also stars Diego Klattenhoff, Ryan Eggold, and Harry Lennix. Executive producers for the series include Jon Bokenkamp, John Eisendrath, and John Davis for Sony Pictures Television, Universal Television, and Davis Entertainment.

Original main cast member Parminder Nagra left the cast at the end of the first season. In December 2013, the show was renewed for a second season, Amir Arison was promoted to the main cast and Mozhan Marnò joined the cast. In February 2015, The Blacklist was renewed for a third season with Hisham Tawfiq promoted to main cast. In May 2017, the show was renewed for the fifth season with Eggold leaving the show. In May 2018, the show was renewed for the sixth season with Marnò leaving on March 29, 2019. In March 2019, The Blacklist was renewed for its seventh season with Laura Sohn joining the cast as a recurring character. She was promoted to series regular on May 7, 2020.

On June 15, 2021, during season 8, Megan Boone reported that she was leaving the show. On May 27, 2022, after season 9, both Amir Arison and Laura Sohn announced they were also leaving the series. On October 7, 2022, Anya Banerjee joined the cast as Siya Malik.

== Cast overview ==
Actor	Character	Position	The Blacklist										Redemption
Actor	Character	Position	1	2	3	4	5	6	7	8	9	10	Redemption
James Spader	Raymond Reddington	Confidential informant, FBI	Main	Main	Main	Main	Main	Main	Main	Main	Main	Main	
Megan Boone	Liz Keen	FBI Special Agent (seasons 1–2, 4–8); FBI Special Consultant (seasons 3-4)	Main	Main	Main	Main	Main	Main	Main	Main			Guest
Diego Klattenhoff	Donald Ressler	FBI Special Agent; Director, FBI Counterterrorism Division (season 3)	Main	Main	Main	Main	Main	Main	Main	Main	Main	Main	
Ryan Eggold	Tom Keen	Covert operative	Main	Main	Main	Main	Main						Main
Parminder Nagra	Meera Malik	CIA Field Agent	Main										
Nikita Tewani	Meera Malik	CIA Field Agent										Guest	
Harry Lennix	Harold Cooper	Director, FBI Counterterrorism Division; FBI special agent (season 9)	Main	Main	Main	Main	Main	Main	Main	Main	Main	Main	Guest
Amir Arison	Aram Mojtabai	FBI Special Agent & Strategic and Tactical Technician (seasons 1–9); Director, FBI Counterterrorism Division (season 9)	R	Main	Main	Main	Main	Main	Main	Main	Main	Guest	
Mozhan Marnò	Samar Navabi	FBI Special Agent; Former Mossad agent		Main	Main	Main	Main	Main			Guest		
Hisham Tawfiq	Dembe Zuma	Reddington's bodyguard (seasons 1–8); FBI Special Agent (seasons 9–10)	Recurring	Recurring	Main	Main	Main	Main	Main	Main	Main	Main	
Laura Sohn	Alina Park	FBI Special Agent							R	Main	Main		
Anya Banerjee	Siya Malik	MI6 Special Agent and Intelligence Officer										Main	
Famke Janssen	Scottie Hargrave	Head of Halcyon Aegis' Grey Matters branch			R		Guest						Main
Edi Gathegi	Matias Solomon	Mercenary			R								Main
Tawny Cypress	Nez Rowan	Mercenary			R								Main
Adrian Martinez	Dumont	Computer hacker			Guest								Main

== Main characters featured in The Blacklist ==
=== Raymond Reddington ===
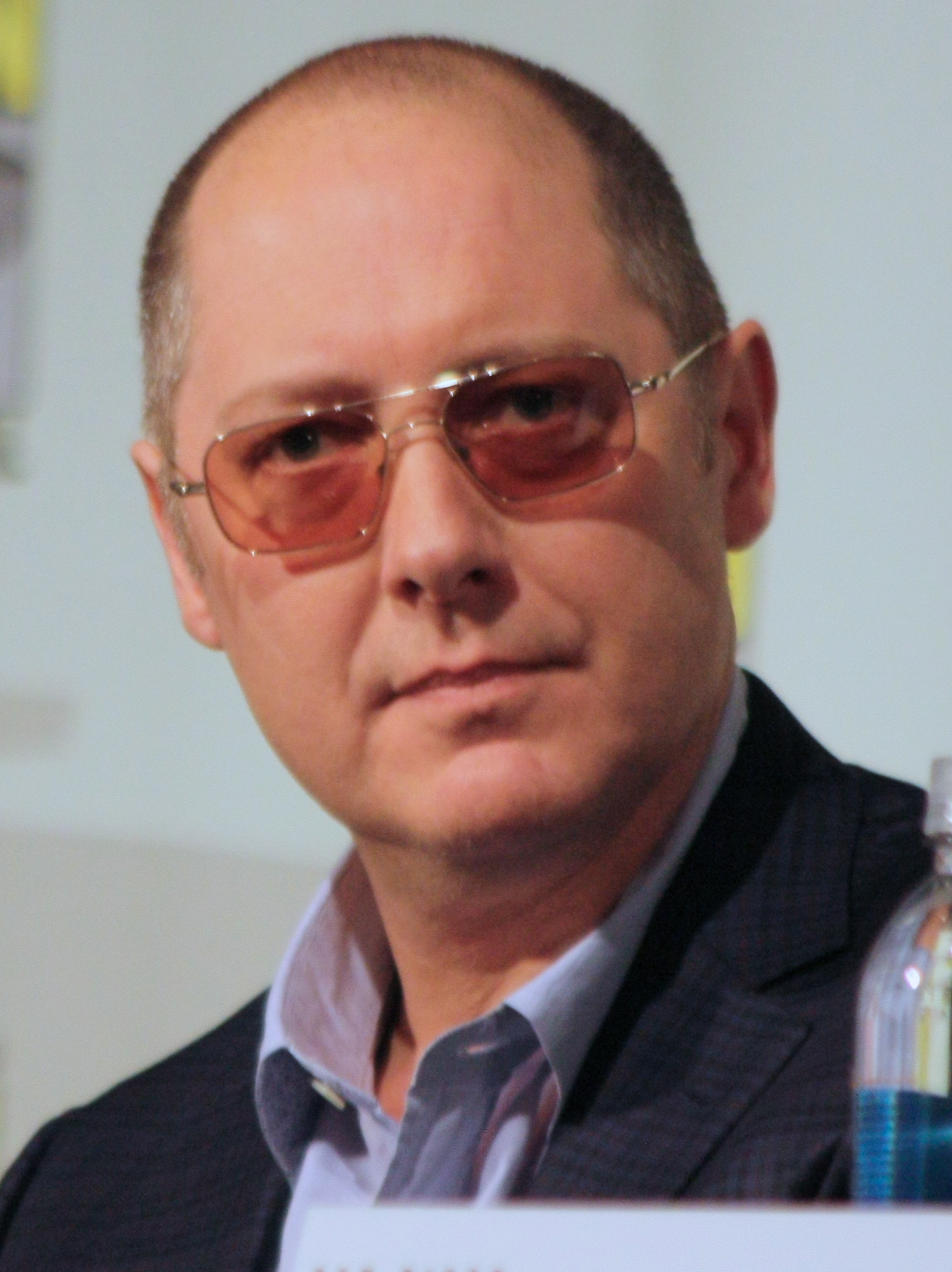
James Spader portrayed Raymond Reddington through all 10 seasons

Portrayed by James Spader

Raymond "Red" Reddington is an ex-United States Navy officer, presumed to be an officer of the Office of Naval Intelligence, and number three on the FBI's Most Wanted List. A U.S. Naval Academy graduate, he worked in US counterintelligence and was being groomed for admiral when something happened on his way home for the Christmas holidays. Reddington was later revealed to have been accused of committing treason by leaking information to the Soviet Union that led to the death of several American naval officers. Nicknamed "the concierge of crime", Reddington is known for brokering deals between criminals.

=== Elizabeth Keen ===
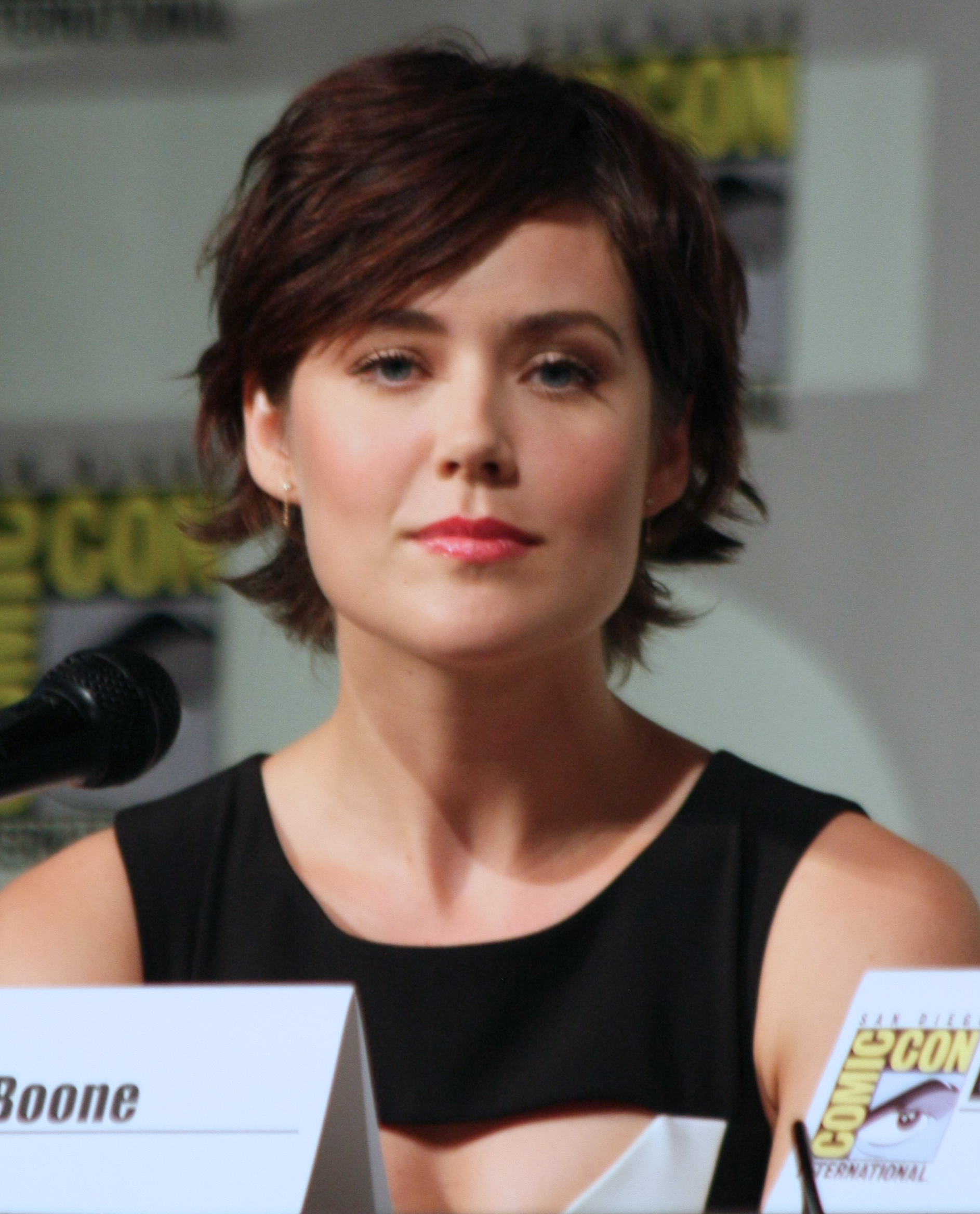
Megan Boone portrayed Elizabeth Keen (seasons 1–8)

Portrayed by Megan Boone

Elizabeth Scott Keen (Blacklister No. 1) is an FBI profiler. According to Reddington and the FBI, her birth name is Masha Rostova, and she was born in Moscow to Katarina Rostova, a Russian intelligence agent whom everyone regards as a "myth". Elizabeth has a mysterious and traumatic past: Her wrist bears a large scar from a fire she was trapped in as a child, and her only memory of her biological father is of him rescuing her from the fire. Reddington admits to blocking her memories of the fire, and she eventually regains her memory of the event, when she killed her father to protect her mother. Reddington had been trying to protect her from the knowledge when he blocked her memories.

She is the only person with whom Reddington is willing to work. She had yet to learn why, but he has told her that it has something to do with her missing father. While her adoptive father lay dying in the hospital, he insists to Red that Liz "deserves to know", but his death is hastened by Red to prevent Liz from "knowing". She develops a bond with Reddington as they continue to work together. The Director indicates a close personal connection exists between Liz and Red, but refuses to tell her what it is. Her once-idyllic marriage to Tom Keen unravels when she discovers evidence that he is not the man he appears to be. After she finds out he was an agent hired by Berlin to keep her under surveillance, she has the marriage annulled. She keeps Tom imprisoned on an abandoned ship for several months, interrogating him. Eventually, she is forced to let him go in exchange for Berlin's location after he murders a harbormaster, Eugene Ames.

Local police investigate Ames's murder and have enough evidence to arrest Liz for her involvement, but she is saved by the intervention of Reddington, Cooper, then-assistant AG Connolly, and Tom himself. She also learns that she is the key to unlocking the mysteries of the Fulcrum and that she has unknowingly had the Fulcrum itself in her possession since childhood. With the help of Leonard Caul, she deciphers the Fulcrum's contents and confronts the Director with them. She is then unknowingly infected with a customized biological weapon by the cabal and tricked into infecting their target, Senator Hawkins. The cabal then frames her for Hawkins's assassination and for being a Russian spy. After shooting Tom Connolly upon learning of his involvement with the faking of Cooper's cancer and the cabal's sinister intentions for the other agents on the task force, Elizabeth is now a fugitive on the FBI's most-wanted list. To evade capture by the FBI, she seeks asylum at the Russian embassy, identifying herself as "Masha Rostova" and pretending to be a Russian spy.

In "Marvin Gerard", as Liz is being escorted to the airport, the convoy is attacked by Ressler, forcing Liz to run on foot. At a diner, she confronts Red for preventing her asylum until she learns he did this to save her from being killed by the cabal. While holding everyone in the diner hostage, Liz attacks a hostage's abusive boyfriend, nearly killing him, until Red stops her. In "Eli Matchett", Liz realizes that even if her name is cleared, she cannot go back to the life she once knew, and must rely on Red to help her survive as a criminal. In "Arioch Cain", Liz and Red fake her death after a bounty is put on her head.

In "Kings of the Highway", Liz tracks down Reddington after he is kidnapped and ransoms him using a valuable object that Dembe claims is needed to clear her name. While Liz and Dembe are making the exchange for Reddington, the FBI arrives and Ressler arrests Liz.

In "The Director", Liz is locked in the task force's cell as Ressler tries to protect her until she can testify. The Director and Laurel Hitchin attempt to prevent this by transferring Liz to an undisclosed location due to her supposedly having terrorist connections and then nearly suffocating her when Aram changes the box's door code. Liz is nearly transferred, but the White House counsel prevents it, and Ressler returns to transfer her to the courthouse. In "The Director: Conclusion", Liz spends the night in a cell protected by Ressler that keeps the cabal from reaching her, but Laurel plots to have her assassinated as she is moved. Liz is later taken before a judge, where she faces multiple charges that each come with a death sentence, including 16 counts of murder. Laurel tries to have Liz assassinated, but is forced to call off her attempt by Red, who captures the Director and threatens to turn him over to the World Court. With the help of Marvin Gerard, Red makes a deal with Laurel for her to publicly exonerate Liz on all but Tom Connolly's murder. In that case, Liz has to plead guilty to involuntary manslaughter and will get three years' probation. Though she would be free, Liz could never return to the FBI. Liz reluctantly takes the deal in the end since Red ensures she will remain part of the task force as an asset like him. Laurel publicly exonerates her while Karakurt is taken into custody and exposed as the man who had committed the terrorist acts Liz had been framed for. That night, Liz emerges from the courthouse a free woman and hugs Red, who is waiting for her.

Liz has difficulty adjusting to no longer being an FBI agent. After being beaten up by a man who thought she was a traitor, she is hospitalized and discovers she is pregnant. She accepts Tom's marriage proposal, hoping to start a family with him.

Liz and Tom's wedding ceremony is interrupted by Mr. Solomon, who pursues them relentlessly. Liz is injured during the chase, forcing Reddington's doctor to perform an emergency caesarian section to save her baby. Liz dies due to complications with the C-section and the inability to reach a hospital on time. Matias Solomon blocks the vehicle containing Liz from continuing to the hospital, and Liz dies with Reddington holding her hand. Red is shown to be completely devastated by her death, as is the rest of the task force, and Tom is left to raise their daughter, Agnes, alone. In "Cape May", Red tells of a time he had to make a Hobson's choice: To save a child and lose her mother or lose both, saying it was the hardest choice he made by far in his life. While he initially seems to be referring to Liz's recent death, a later conversation reveals that the allusion was toward saving Liz (née Masha) as a child and losing her mother, Katarina.

In "Alexander Kirk: Conclusion", Liz is shown to be alive. The shootout at the wedding led her, Reddington's doctor, Tom, and Kaplan to fake her death so Tom and she could flee and protect Agnes. Liz secretly escapes to Cuba, and is reunited with Tom days later, but is captured by Alexander Kirk's men. Tied to a chair, Liz meets with Kirk, who reveals he is in fact her father, Constantin Rostov.

In "Esteban", Liz does not believe Kirk and demands to know what he is planning to do with Tom, Agnes, and her. Kirk claims that her daughter will be fine and that he just needs to get rid of the rat. Kirk plans to take her back to the house where she grew up so she can see the truth for herself. In "Mato", Liz gets a clue from her past when she sees her mother, Katarina, putting a few toys and a ribbon bracelet in a coffee can to be used as a time capsule. Liz digs the can up and discovers some truth in Kirk's words. When she is rescued by the FBI, Liz is reunited with Tom. In "Miles McGrath", Liz reads through her mother's journal and comes up with an important clue involving rare cancer plaguing the males of the Rostov family. Only then does Red reveal the truth in Kirk's plans to use Liz for a blood transfusion, since her blood contains vital blood cells needed to help him replenish his own, and without her, he will keep Agnes hostage.

In "The Lindquist Concerns", Liz discovers a DNA test done by Kirk that claims her to be his daughter and briefly mistrusts Red for it. In "The Thrushes", Liz helps Red talk Kirk out of committing suicide by begging him to give Agnes back to her. He does give her back to Liz, which leads to his arrest.

In "Dr. Adrian Shaw", Kirk is taken to the hospital, and Liz, believing she may be his only chance of rescuing him, takes a DNA test. If she is found to be a match, they will prepare her for surgery and do a blood transfusion. When Tom finds out, he confronts Liz about the decision and admits that he had met his mother, Susan, months earlier. Despite his warning not to get close to Kirk, Liz mentions that she needs to help him since he may provide the answers to who she is. While being prepared for surgery, a doctor tells her that the DNA test results between Kirk and her came back and they are not a match. Believing Red has sent false transcripts of the DNA test, she calls him to confront him, only to discover that Kirk had lied to her the whole time and the DNA transcript that Tom had given her was falsified. Angered by this, Liz confronts Kirk for lying to her and abandons him. In "Dr. Adrian Shaw: Conclusion", while Red is being held captive and threatened by Kirk, Red tells Kirk that he is Elizabeth Keen's father ("What do you want me to say? Yes. Yes, Elizabeth is my daughter.").

In "Lipet's Seafood Company", Red calls in a favor from newly elected president Robert Diaz. Liz is granted a full presidential pardon for Connolly's death, allowing her reinstatement as an FBI agent.

In "Dr. Bogdan Krilov", Liz and Samar are sent to confront Dr. Krilov and discover Kaplan's plan to use Ressler to kill Hitchin, since she is Red's only link to the cabal under pretenses. Liz discovers the truth about Kaplan being her former nanny, whom she used to call Katya, and she begs Liz to end her relationship with Red before it is too late. Despite stopping Ressler from making a big mistake, Liz confronts Hitchin and tells her they will investigate Reven Wright's disappearance. Inside the ice rink, Liz finally meets with Julian Gale, who demands the FBI transcripts of their involvement with Red. She refuses to cooperate and suspects he has an ulterior motive in wanting the transcripts so he can capture Red.

In "The Debt Collector", Liz is kidnapped by Edgar Grant, who was presumably hired by a man she had arrested previously, who forced Red to cooperate with Kaplan. When he takes her to the cabin to meet with his client, Liz and Grant are taken by surprise when Red shows up. Despite Liz's attempts to help Red reconcile with Kaplan, a gunshot is fired by an unknown assailant. Liz later calls Red and informs him of her suspicion of Gale being his assailant.

In "Mr. Kaplan, Conclusion", Liz is informed by Harold that he had done a DNA test between Red and her, and she will know within 24 hours if he is her father. She later tries to appeal to Kaplan to end the war with Red, and she wants to show her a secret. On their way there, Red's men block the attempt, and despite Kaplan's warning not to leave the car, Liz does. After opening an envelope containing the DNA test and believing it to be Kaplan's secret, Liz confronts Red for not telling her the truth about him being her father and having to find out from Cooper. She tells him that she was upset that she had already lost her mother, her nanny, and Sam, the people who knew her the best. Despite this, Liz mentions that she cannot let Red deny the fact that she is just like him and that anger, despair, and love are part of a normal family. Liz also realizes that Red wanted her to grow more as an FBI profiler and embraces him.

In "Zarak Mosadek", while staking out a pub in Baltimore with Aram, Liz discovers a woman named Lillian, who works as a bartender, meeting with Garvey. Later on, after taking her to the apartment where she lives, Liz is surprised when she learns Lillian was put in the Witness Protection Program by Garvey because of Red's past abuse of her mother Naomi and her. She mentions that she is also Red's daughter and they are half-sisters.

In "Sutton Ross", Liz visits Tom's gravesite, and she tells Tom's ghost that she now knows that her father, Raymond Reddington, is dead and that the man is an imposter. Tom warns Liz to be careful due to how resourceful the imposter is.

In "Rassvet", Liz tracks down her grandfather Dominic Wilkinson with the help of Ressler and finally learns much of the truth about Reddington and her mother from him. Liz learns that the man she shot as a child, as remembered in "Tom Connolly", was, in fact, the real Reddington and she killed him. Dom tells Liz about her mother and her history with Ilya Koslov, the man who became Reddington to protect Katarina. Dom states that 28 years before, her mother had promised to send him a letter to a post-office box when she was safe, but he has never gotten one despite checking every week. Liz later flies to Hong Kong and reveals to Reddington that she knows the truth about who he really is, but he refuses to answer her questions about why he continued being Reddington after gaining access to all of his money.

In "Elizabeth Keen", she becomes number one on the blacklist and plots against Reddington. Reddington tells Dembe that he only wants Liz found, not necessarily caught. Dembe suggests that Red's killing of Katarina in front of Liz was part of his plan to groom Liz to take over his empire, but Red admits that he never had a plan going in. In the end, Liz manages to rob Red of 35 million euros ($41,000,000). While Aram and Ressler attempt to resign so that someone else can go after Liz, due to their conflicting feelings on the matter, Cooper admits that he would also have to resign in that case, and the three men decide to continue the hunt for Liz themselves rather than send total strangers after her.

In "Konets", Liz gets an offer from Reddington, who gives her a letter containing all the answers about his identity she was seeking, but first, she had to kill him and take his empire over. Liz could have killed Red and put an end to his mystery, but only then does she understand how much she needs him in her life. However, she accepts the offer because she still wants to know who Reddington is. When she finally faces Reddington, Vandyke shoots her and she is left bleeding on the street before Ressler arrives.

In season 9, Red investigates Liz's murder, trying to discover who was truly responsible despite numerous obstacles being put in his way. In "Caelum Bank," Red finally discovers that it was Marvin Gerard. After a confrontation with Red, Gerard commits suicide the night before the third anniversary of Liz's death. The next morning, Cooper, Aram, Dembe, Park, and Ressler all gather at Liz's grave to remember their friend and share their happy memories of Liz's life.

=== Donald Ressler ===
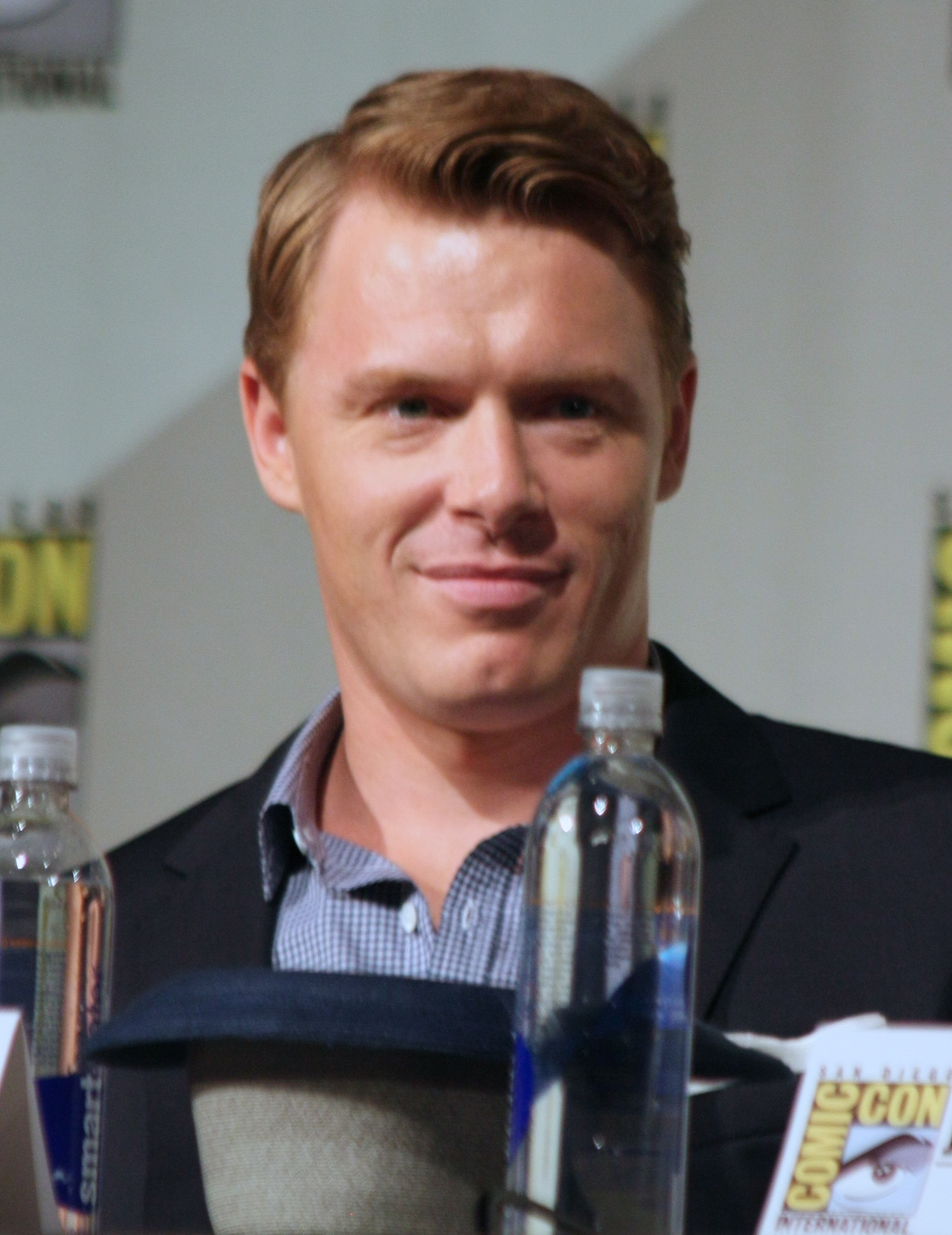
Diego Klattenhoff portrayed Donald Ressler through all 10 seasons

Portrayed by Diego Klattenhoff

Donald Ressler is a senior FBI agent who is a stickler for procedure. His father was an honest policeman who was betrayed and killed by his corrupt partner after refusing to take bribes. He spent five years on an FBI task force obsessively pursuing Reddington, which resulted in his fiancée's breaking off their engagement. He despises having to work with a criminal like Reddington, but he acknowledges that Reddington does get results. Initially, he distrusts Liz Keen and her connection to Reddington, but eventually comes to respect and work well with her. After he was shot by Anslo Garrick, he reignited his relationship with his former fiancée, Audrey Bidwell. In "Mako Tanida", though, she was killed by Mako Tanida, forcing Ressler to side with Red to find him. After capturing him, Ressler and his friend Bobby Jonica take him to his father's secret cabin. On the drive there, Ressler is betrayed when Tanida informs him that he was not responsible for the deaths of both the FBI agents and Audrey. He also learns that Jonica assumed Akio's (Tanida's deceased brother) identity to take over his business, leading the latter to shoot Tanida for exposing him, and Ressler slamming the brakes to stop him. After capturing Jonica, Ressler blamed him for his betrayal that led to the deaths of their closest friends and Audrey. He also admits that while he does not like working with Red, he was the reason why Ressler had Audrey back in his life, and because of Jonica, she is dead. Ressler gave Jonica a choice to kill himself with a knife or to be shot. Liz convinces Ressler to stand down as Jonica kills himself with the knife. Back at his apartment, Ressler is heartbroken when he discovers a pregnancy test and learns that Audrey was pregnant with his child. He later developed an addiction to pain medication from what he went through with Audrey's death and later Meera's own. He managed to overcome it when Liz convinces Ressler to seek help.

In "Tom Connolly", with Cooper removed from being the FBI director of counterterrorism and finally being aware of the cabal, Wright names Ressler as acting director. When Liz goes on the run after killing Tom Connolly, Ressler urges her to come in, saying that otherwise, he will have to lead the FBI manhunt against her.

In "The Troll Farmer", Ressler interrogates Cooper for his involvement in letting Liz escape and learns a few of the cabal's plans for the FBI itself. He eventually decides to release Cooper, but warns that they will keep an eye on him. In "Marvin Gerard", Red informs Ressler that the cabal had set a trap up for Liz at the airport and he rushes in to prevent the departure. Though he succeeds, Liz is shaken up by his reckless actions, believing he wanted to capture her, and flees the scene before Ressler could explain himself. He is later visited by Tom Keen, who wishes to assist him, knowing trouble is on the horizon for both Red and Liz. In "Eli Matchett", Ressler refuses his help and warns him to stay out of his way.

After arresting Liz, Ressler joins Red's efforts to protect her from the cabal, aiding in protecting Karakurt in "the Director". He later tells Liz that he believes she was framed and he would not have arrested her if he believed he could not protect her. Ressler can protect Liz until Red forces the cabal to exonerate her. He then returns control of the task force to the reinstated Cooper.

In the season-four episode "Philomena", Ressler's old friend Julian Gale invites Ressler to join his investigation into the 86 bodies exhumed by Mr. Kaplan. Cooper suggests Ressler do so to help the task force stay ahead of Gale's investigation.

In "Dr. Bogdan Krilov", Ressler follows an anonymous tip on Reven Wright's disappearance that leads to a woman living with her sister who has claimed she saw Hitchin order some men carrying a rolled carpet. When he delved further, the woman admitted she saw a foot come out of the carpet, leading Reesler to suspect that Hitchin murdered Wright. Before he could take the woman into protective custody, Ressler and she are attacked by men presumably working for Hitchin. However, Liz and Samar suspect he was being manipulated by Kaplan after Krilov confesses. They stop Ressler just in time from killing Hitchin and Liz revealing he was under the influence of propofol and manipulated to kill Hitchin by Kaplan and Krilov. Despite standing down, Ressler is later taken into custody with his FBI badge revoked.

In "The Debt Collector", when he is accused by Gale of wanting to help Red, Ressler reprimands him for being selfish. He points out to Gale that he was on another assignment by looking into Wright's murder and had no time to deal with Red's shenanigans. Ressler lost his badge upon being under the influence of propofol and nearly killed Hitchin had Liz and Samar not stopped him. The last thing he needed is Gale causing him more problems with his life. He later apologizes to Ressler upon learning what happened to him.

In "Mr. Kaplan", Ressler informs Cooper, Liz, and Samar that Gale has gotten enough intelligence to demand an indictment on the task force involving Red from the grand jury.

In "Mr. Kaplan, Conclusion", Red helps Ressler locate Hitchin's cleaner Henry Prescott, who leads him to the murdered Reven Wright. However, Reddington uses the body to force Hitchin into dropping the investigation, though it means that Wright will not get justice as Ressler wanted. Hitchin subsequently returns Ressler's badge, but they get into an altercation, causing Ressler to accidentally kill her. He later calls Prescott to help hide Hitchin's body similarly to Wright's, under the pseudonym Red gave Ressler, Frank Sturgeon.

In "Smokey Putnum", Ressler is informed by Cooper that Hitchin died by hitting her head and no further investigation will occur. He seems relieved by this until Prescott visits him in his van. He informs Ressler that he knows the truth and blackmails him for favors if he wants Prescott to keep his secret involving his accidental murdering of Hitchin.

In "Miss Rebecca Thrall", Ressler is contacted by Prescott for a favor involving a package inside of a car to be delivered to him. He is reminded of their deal in what could happen if he refuses. After delivering the car to Prescott, Ressler warns him to never call him again.

In "The Informant", while pursuing a criminal, Ressler is contacted by Prescott to stop pursuing his clients. While searching Judge Sonia Fisher's apartment, Ressler asks Samar to search the bedroom. After she leaves, he comes across a tablet and uses the password on it. There, Ressler discovers the names of Prescott's clients, including his own name on the list. He gets a call from Red, telling him it is time they had a chat. With Red's help, Ressler discovered Prescott's real name and meets him in the park, where he is playing football with his family, and arrests him. Afterward, he gives Cooper a letter of resignation and includes his confession for all the things he has done. Cooper rejects the letter, stating that his name was not found on Prescott's client list. Prescott is later killed by Reddington, who removed Ressler from the list.

In "Brothers", as a teenager, Ressler shot and apparently killed his father's former partner Tommy Markin after overhearing a phone call in which Markin revealed the truth during Ressler's father's funeral. The murder of his father and Ressler's revenge killing inspired him to follow in his father's footsteps and join law enforcement, having previously been a troubled teen going down a bad path while his brother Robby was heading to the police academy. Robby covered up his actions and hid the body while in the present day, Robby seeks Ressler's help after the field where he buried Markin is being dug up for development purposes. Ressler and Robby try to move the body, only for it to be stolen by the Albanian mob to whom Robby owes money. The mob uses Markin's body to blackmail Ressler into stealing a file for them. Robby eventually reveals that Markin was still alive after Ressler shot him before Robby finished Markin off. The brothers decide to come clean to Liz, though it means they will go to prison. With Liz's help, Ressler takes down the mobsters after his brother and they reconcile, but are not arrested, as Liz manages to make the body disappear. Liz later explains to Ressler that he is the one thing she can count on in her chaotic life and cannot afford to lose him.

=== Aram Mojtabai ===
Portrayed by Amir Arison

Aram Mojtabai is a quirky and skilled technician who regularly assists the FBI. He formerly worked for the NSA. He is friends with Elizabeth Keen. Aram is shown to like Samar Navabi until they suffered a falling out in "Gaia".

In "The Djinn", Red appeals to Aram for help in locating Nasim Bakhash as part of his plans to exonerate Keen. In "Kings of the Highway", Aram reveals what he has learned from the laptop in exchange for Ressler telling him of the protocols. There, healso begins to feel guilty for having to tell Ressler about Samar's plans to help Liz and Red. As she leaves, Aram realizes the extent of what could happen to Keen if the cabal gets their hands on her and has to decide where his loyalties lie.

When Liz is arrested and the Director comes to take her into custody, Aram changes the password to her cell to lock him out. The Director cuts off Liz's air to force Aram to give up the password. Aram then confronts the Director at gunpoint in a desperate attempt to stop him from taking Liz. She persuades Aram to stand down, but in the process, he buys enough time for Cynthia Panabaker, the White House counsel, to arrive and transfer Liz to a federal courthouse under Ressler's direct supervision. Aram later joins Red's team to kidnap the Director and exonerate Liz by using his computer skills to hack an elevator's controls to make it go to the wrong floor. In "Miles McGrath", Aram has been seeing a woman named Janet Sutherland, and his relationship with Samar suffers a falling out when he finds out about her plans for a transfer. At the end of "Gaia", Aram coldly tells Samar that he is glad she is leaving the team when he found out that she blamed him for an action Cooper did on his behalf, as it was against his morals to kill again. He also mentions he only congratulated her out of respect for both Ressler and Cooper. Aram tells Samar that he is very angry at her because he wished she had told him about her plans to transfer and slams the door in her face.

In "The Thrushes", Aram's girlfriend, Janet, is shown to an undercover operative hired by Alexander Kirk to gain access to the FBI's computer networks through Aram. She was suspected by Samar and Ressler the whole time and they present their evidence to him, finding that he has already figured out she is a mole. When Aram discovers this, he regrets how he treated Samar after learning she did love him. Using himself as bait, he can keep Janet occupied long enough for Ressler to arrest her. At the end of the episode, Aram is comforted by Samar and realizes his feelings for her. He is happy when she admits she rescinded her transfer papers and decided to stay.

In "The Architect", Aram is sent undercover to bring down a blacklister known as the Architect. Aram is forced to aid in the prison break of a man about to be executed and witnesses the Architect's brutality in securing the man's freedom. Aram is rescued by Samar and Ressler, but the Architect escapes. Recognizing that more people will die if the Architect escapes and shaken by what he has witnessed, Aram kills the Architect with his own portable coilgun without hesitation. When he is shaken again by his actions, Samar comforted Aram and convinces him that he did the right thing in killing the Architect.

In "Dembe Zuma", Dembe kidnaps Aram to get him to help find the traitor in Red's syndicate. After helping Dembe find a name as a clue, he returns to the post office to catch Janet and Samar in a confrontation. Though he can defuse the situation by escorting Janet away from Samar, Aram becomes worried for her when she leaves work without talking to him.

In "Mr. Kaplan", Aram is about to go speed walking with Janet until he is ordered by a man to appear before an inquiry involving the task force. Despite defending the task force and Red, he is imprisoned in the same cell where Liz was held.

In "Mr. Kaplan, Conclusion", Aram learns about Janet testifying against him to protect her deal and why Samar never told him about it out of a need to protect him. He realizes that she was not right for him and ends their relationship for good. Coming back to the task force, Aram realizes Samar's feelings for him and shares a kiss with her.

=== Tom Keen ===
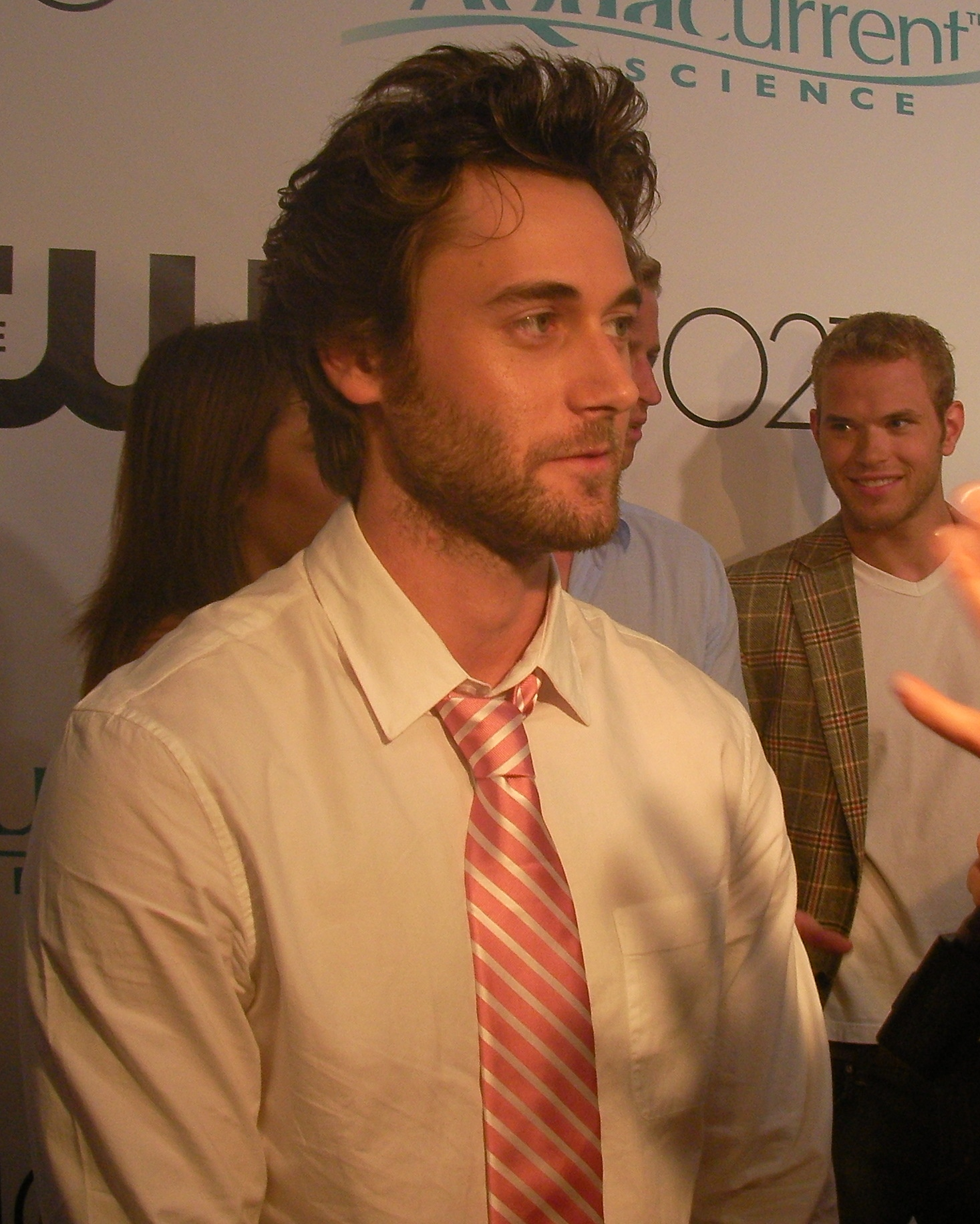
Ryan Eggold portrayed Tom Keen (seasons 1–5)

Portrayed by Ryan Eggold

Thomas Vincent Keen, born Christopher Hargrave (Blacklister number 7), is Elizabeth's husband, an elementary school teacher who turns out to be a covert operative working for Berlin. When first confronted by Elizabeth, Tom asserts to her that he was assigned to protect her and that Reddington "is not who [she] thinks he is". Elizabeth shoots him and stages his death but keeps him prisoner on a boat for several months to extract as much information as possible. When she is nearly discovered by the harbormaster, Tom saves her by strangling him to death; as a token of gratitude, she lets Tom escape. Tom later meets with Reddington, and their conversation reveals a previous working relationship. Apparently, Tom was recruited at the age of 14 (he was then known as Jacob Phelps) by a blacklister known as the Major (Lance Henriksen) due to the combination of sociopathy and extreme talent and spent the better part of the next 20 years as a deep-cover operative for various criminal enterprises. Reddington acquired him from the Major to insert him into Elizabeth's life, but when Berlin found out, he doubled Reddington's price. After his escape, Tom uses the Major for a new covert operation as a neo-Nazi drug and arms dealer in Dresden named Christof Mannheim, but not before calling Elizabeth; he appears to have developed genuine feelings for her during their "marriage", which seems to complicate matters for both the Major and Reddington since it was the reason behind his killing the harbormaster on Elizabeth's boat. When Elizabeth nearly gets subpoenaed for the harbormaster's murder, Reddington and Ressler attempt to extradite Tom from Germany so he can clear her name; Tom initially refuses but then appears in court and willfully surrenders. With the assistance of Assistant Attorney General "Smiling Tommy" Connolly, Reddington helps Tom and Elizabeth sweep the whole event under the rug; Elizabeth is cleared while Tom "never existed". The Major, seeing Tom as a liability after this affair, tries to shoot Tom, but the Germans intercept them; Tom bargains for their lives, and they both manage to escape, but the Major is still set to have Tom killed. Desperate, Tom hides at Elizabeth's place and pleads with her to give him his passports; in exchange, she convinces him to tell her the truth about his relationship with Reddington before revealing that she had always known that on some level, Tom's love for her and their life together was genuine. He later tells Liz of his dream to become a fisherman and urges her to come with him to Japan to start a new life with each other, but she declines, telling him that she needs to finish what she's started. After Liz kills Tom Connolly and becomes one of the FBI's most wanted, Tom departs on his boat to Japan to begin his new life.

In "Marvin Gerard", Tom appears before Ressler, wishing to assist him in saving Liz, suspecting the tides are against Red's favor. In "Eli Matchett", he and Ressler get into a brief scuffle with each other. While waiting for Liz to call him, Tom meets with Cooper and is recruited to help investigate Karakurt. Posing as a hustler, he befriends a wealthy socialite and infiltrates an underground street-fighting ring, where he eventually locates Karakurt. He brings the assassin to Cooper, but the Cabal finds them, forcing all three men to go on the run. Eventually, with Ressler and Cooper's help, he evades the Cabal and delivers Karakurt into federal custody. After Liz is released, Tom proposes marriage to her, but she turns him down, saying that she is too uncertain about the future to accept. Tom is later confronted by Red, who warns him to stay away from Liz, after the actions he pulled when he ignored his first warning led to this. After Liz's death, he tells Red to stay away from Agnes and blames him for his failure to protect her.

In "The Artax Network", Samar visits Tom in the hospital, who has been having a hard time raising Agnes alone, and offers to help him. Tom is later recruited again by Cooper to keep an eye on Cynthia Panabaker, and he discovers more that confirms Cooper's suspicion. Visiting Cooper at the post office, he can confirm the woman that Panabaker had a meeting with looks like Liz's mother, Katarina.

In "Alexander Kirk", Tom is forced to work with Matias Solomon and Susan Hargrave, the people responsible for Liz's death, to get at Alexander Kirk, the man who ordered the attack. During the mission, Tom shoots Solomon in revenge, but Solomon seemingly gets away after Tom leaves. Tom later goes after Susan before Red calls him to stop Tom. Red reveals that Tom is in fact Christopher Hargrave, Susan's long-missing son. Moments later, Susan enters and tells him about her son, how he disappeared twenty-eight years earlier when he was three years old, and how she always hopes to see him again. On Red's advice, Tom doesn't let Susan know he's her son but doesn't kill her for Agnes' sake.

In "Alexander Kirk: Conclusion", Tom gives Red's detail the slip and heads for Cuba. It emerges that he was in on Liz's plan to fake her death in order to give herself and Agnes a normal life. Unfortunately, Kirk pinged Tom's phone at the hospital, allowing his men to track the Keens to Cuba and kidnap Liz.

In "The Lindquist Concern" Tom suspects Kirk is manipulating Liz and seeks out Ressler's help for previous files from the FBI. Though still unable to trust him, Ressler agrees to help Tom out by giving him previous FBI files. Tom's spying on one of Kirk's men and confrontation leads him to where Kirk's true whereabouts are: Russia. He calls Liz to warn Red about Kirk's plans to kill him.

In "The Architect", Tom searches for the truth about his true parentage and why he disappeared years ago, after reading about the death of his father, Howard Hargrave. His search leads to a mother whose son made Tom disappear and procures a confession from him.

In "Whitehall/Whitehall Conclusion (The Blacklist: Redemption)", Tom discovers his father, Howard, is alive and being held in a mental hospital. He also learns that Susan had faked Howard's death and had an ulterior motive for Halycon. This leads to Tom convincing Nez to side with him as they try to uncover the truth of the secret Susan had been hiding the whole time concerning Whitehall. Solomon tries to stop Tom and Nez, claiming that Susan was set up by Howard and had no knowledge of it.

In "Mr. Kaplan, Conclusion", Tom found the suitcase Kaplan left in the storage locker and looks inside it. He discovers the skeletal remains of an undisclosed person and closes the suitcase. Tom then takes it with him under Kaplan's orders to deliver the suitcase.

In "Ian Garvey", Tom finally finds out who the skeletal remains belong to and the connection she has with Elizabeth. Now realizing the truth, he calls Liz to come home and plans to tell her the truth about her mother, along with the fact that Red killed Kopal. However, Ian Garvey interferes with his group and attacks the two. Having taken back the bag containing the skeletal remains, he leaves and has a few of his men get rid of Tom and Liz to send a message to Red. Despite Tom's best efforts to fight them off, he is stabbed as Liz loses consciousness. Tom's final words are that Liz will be the one to make it, and he dies in the hospital.

=== Meera Malik ===
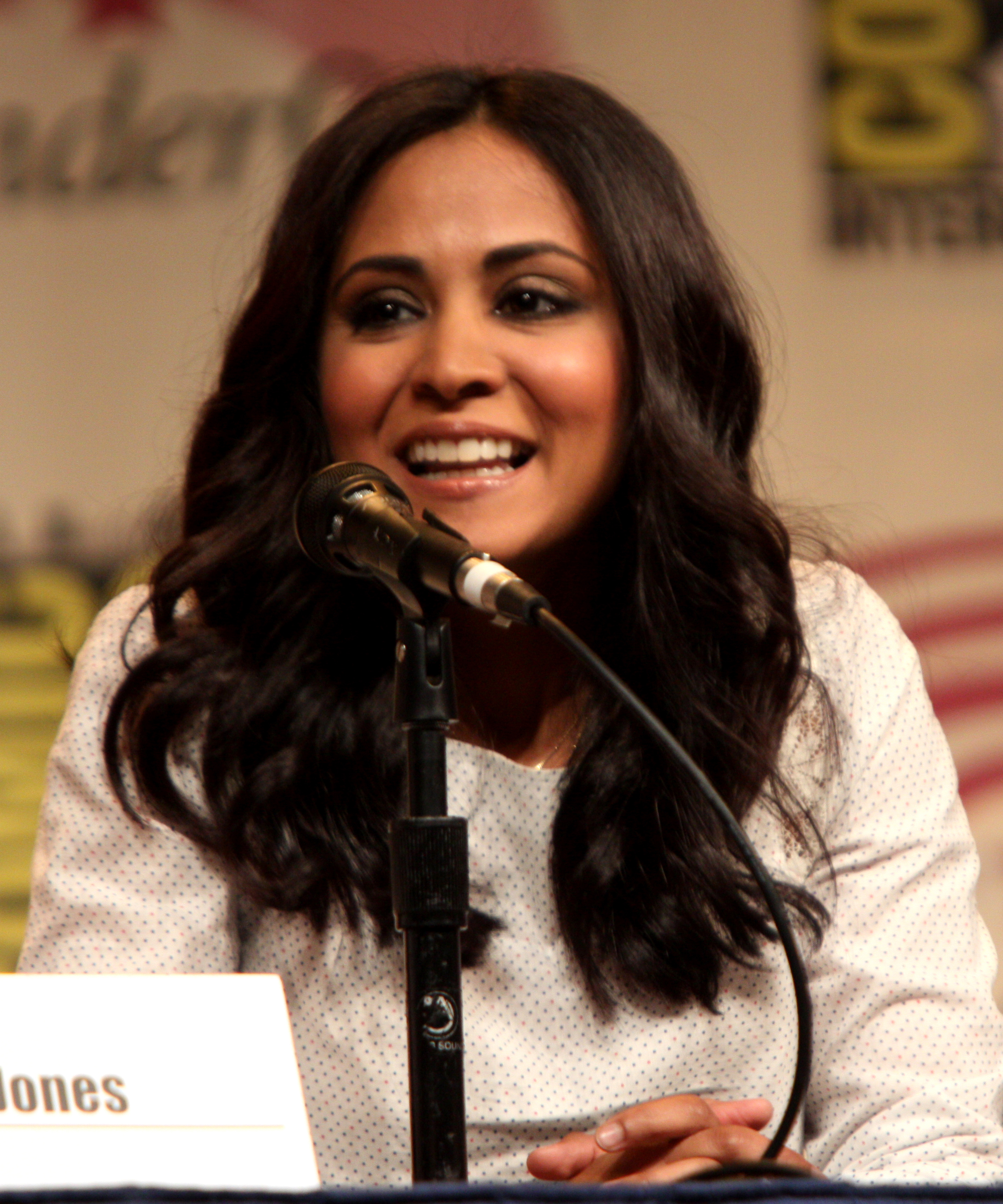
Parminder Nagra portrayed Meera Malik for the character's single (1st) season

Portrayed by Parminder Nagra

Meera Malik is a CIA field agent assigned to Reddington's security detail at the personal request of Diane Fowler. Not much has been revealed about her character other than that she is a CIA agent tasked with Reddington's file, and that she is the mother of two children. She unknowingly leaked information to the terrorist Anslo Garrick upon the orders of an unknown individual. Reddington discovers this and forces her to help him unmask the person responsible. She ends up betraying the task force. In season 1's finale, "Berlin: Conclusion," she is killed in a nightclub by an escaped convict who slits her throat.

In season 10, Meera's daughter is revealed to be an MI6 agent who ends up joining the task force, which she knew about due to her mother's role on it.

=== Harold Cooper ===
Portrayed by Harry Lennix

Harold Cooper is the assistant director of the FBI Counterterrorism Division and head of the covert FBI task force assigned to pursue the criminals on the Blacklist. He is on an upwardly mobile career path in the bureau, something that his work with Reddington occasionally threatens to derail. He had a particular interest in Reddington's past and is willing to oblige Reddington's unusual requests due to this understanding of him. He was attacked and put into a coma by Berlin's agents at the end of season 1.

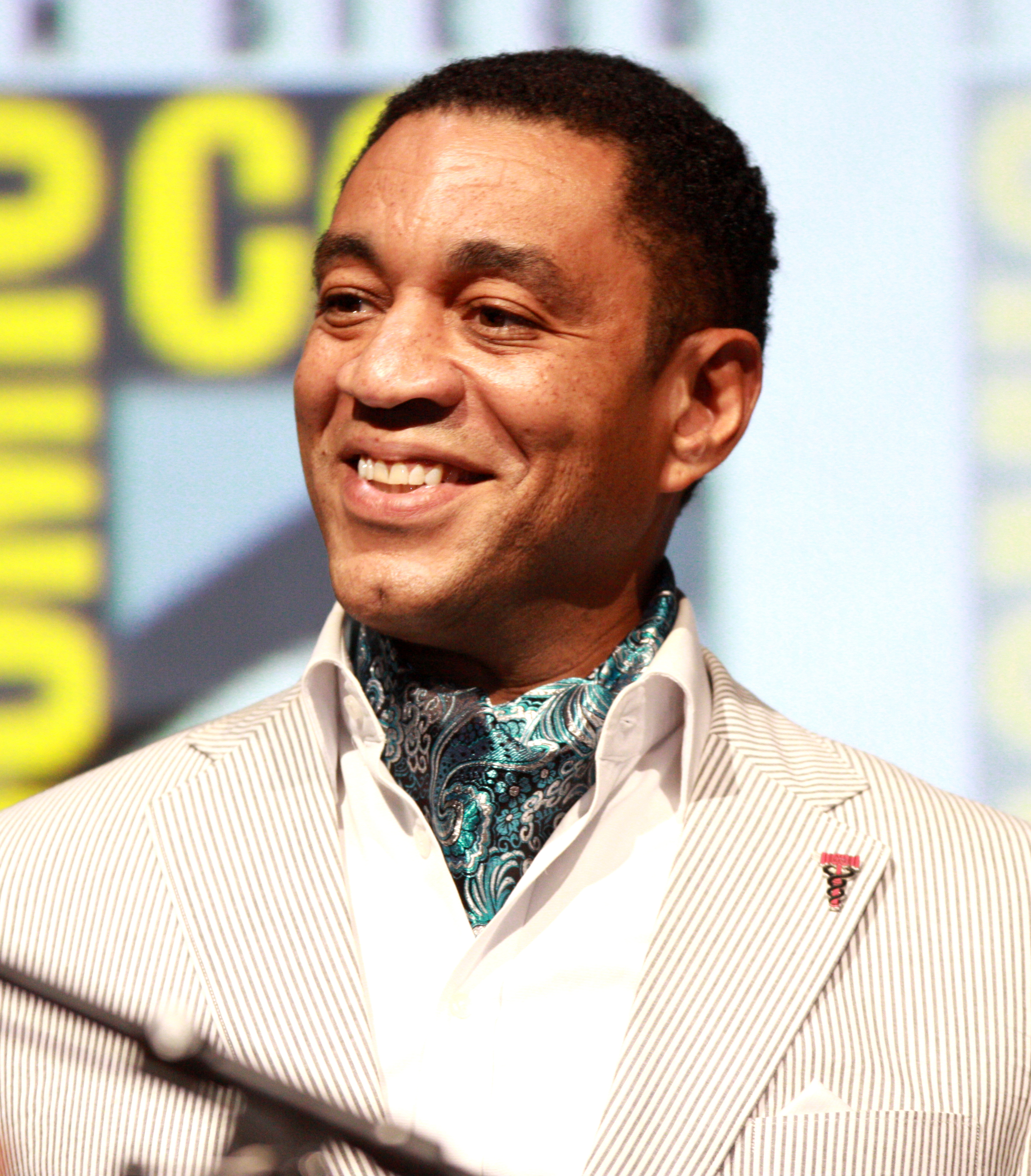
Harry Lennix portrayed Harold Cooper through all 10 seasons

By season 2, Cooper regained consciousness, but has an inoperable brain tumor in the episode "T. Earl King VI". With the help of his friend, Attorney General Connolly, he entered an experimental drug trial. He has had to compromise his ethics, though, and perform various morally dubious tasks for Connolly to stay in his favor and remain in the trial. He confronts Connolly, who admits that he has been manipulating him on behalf of the cabal. He blackmails Cooper into helping them, saying that they will destroy Cooper and his wife Charlene if he fails to cooperate. Cooper tells Reddington about the situation, and the two attempt to use Cooper's connection to Connolly against the cabal. When Liz is framed for the assassination of Senator Hawkins, Cooper flatly refuses to cooperate with the Cabal and is placed on administrative leave by Connolly. After Liz finds evidence that Cooper's doctor is working for the Cabal, Cooper confronts the man and discovers that the Cabal faked his cancer and that he is not dying. After he witnesses Liz's murder of Connolly, he tells her to run, and later turns over his badge. Ressler interrogates him to determine his complicity in Connolly's murder but eventually decides to release him.

In "Marvin Gerard", Cooper is told by Wright that for him to have the charges dropped against him, Cooper not only has to resign, but also take a desk job. Although he reluctantly does, Cooper is determined to help Liz clear her name and investigates Karakurt. In "Eli Matchett", Cooper meets with Tom in a Chinese restaurant and although he cannot be trusted, Cooper thinks he is perfect for the job. He recruits Tom to help investigate Karakurt. Later, Tom brings Karakurt to Cooper's house and they are forced to flee with Charlene when the cabal sends a team to kill Karakurt. Charlene suggests they hide at their neighbor's cabin, admitting that she had cheated on Cooper with him.

In "The Director Conclusion", after Red forces the Cabal to exonerate Liz, a mission Cooper aids in, Cooper is reinstated as head of the task force and congratulates Ressler for his work in Cooper's absence. Later, he separates from Charlene.

In "Mr. Kaplan: Conclusion", after facing the prospect of the task force being shut down due to Kaplan's war on Reddington, Cooper resolves to settle once and for all the question of Liz and Reddington's relationship. He takes a sample of Reddington's blood from an evidence locker for an old case and has it tested against Liz's DNA.

In "Kuwait", it is revealed that as a young soldier during the Gulf War, Cooper covered up an illicit smuggling operation run by his superiors. His friend, Daniel Hutton, discovered Cooper's involvement and the two argued when Hutton threatened to blow the whistle on the operation. Iraqi soldiers attacked the pair and kidnapped Hutton. Cooper's commander later recommended him for the Navy Cross in exchange for his silence regarding the smuggling. In the present day, Hutton turns up alive and Cooper travels to Iran to rescue him. While attempting to return to the US, Cooper is captured by Hutton's men. Hutton reveals he escaped captivity years ago and became "the Simoom", an infamous terrorist who sold classified information to criminals. He tortures Cooper, but Reddington arrives to rescue him and kill Hutton.

=== Samar Navabi ===
Portrayed by Mozhan Marnò

Samar Navabi is a Mossad agent from Iran. She is a highly skilled interrogator. She first appears in the season 2 premiere, "Lord Baltimore", in which she briefly captures and interrogates Reddington. Later she joins the Blacklist task force on an indefinite basis. She appears to be colluding with Reddington for an unknown purpose.

In "Zal Bin Hassan", Samar's past is revealed and how she witnessed the death of her parents. Red then scolds her knowing that she almost had her family's killer back in Cairo, but missed one key element that led to both her partner being killed and Samar being hospitalized. She has an emotional reunion with her brother, Shahin, who was believed to have died years earlier in a bombing. However, Samar soon discovers that her brother is not who she believes him to be, and is in fact the very terrorist she had spent years hunting. She helps her former partner Levi destroy important documents, but she is captured by her brother and taken to the harbor, where Reddington intercepts them, freeing Samar and capturing Shahin. Reddington asks Samar to let him take Shahin for his own purposes, and she sadly agrees, saying her brother died long ago. Afterward, Samar and Ressler become intimate.

Samar secretly helps Liz locate Reddington after he is kidnapped. When Ressler finds out and confronts her, she admits to it and to previously tipping Liz and Tom off to help them evade the FBI, arguing that if Liz is arrested, she will inevitably be killed by the Cabal. In response, Ressler promptly fires Samar from the task force. She then joins Reddington and helps him carry out his plan to exonerate Liz. After Liz is released, Samar rejoins the task force.

In "Gaia", she and Aram fought over her plans to transfer, with the latter admitting that he only congratulated her out of respect for both Ressler and Cooper. When he tells her off how he truly felt and leaves, only then Samar begins to feel guilty for hurting Aram.

In "The Lindquist Concerns", Samar is comforted by Ressler and she trusts him enough to tell him of her suspicions on Aram's girlfriend, Janet, being up to no good. In "The Thrushes", she and Ressler confirm their suspicions to Cooper about Janet before confronting him about it. When Samar revealed the knowledge that she and Ressler investigated her being an operative working for Kirk to gain FBI files, Aram regretted how he treated her. After the operative is arrested, Samar comforts Aram and pleases him by admitting she rescinded on her transfer papers. In "Dr. Adrian Shaw", Samar and Ressler attempt to find Sonia Bloom, only to learn that Red beat them for it. She confronts him on the phone with the belief he has plans to kill Bloom. Red evades Samar's question, but only mentions he will expose the truth soon.

In "Lipet's Seafood Company", Samar engages in an unsanctioned Mossad operation to steal a microchip without the FBI's knowledge. She deliberately misleads Aram when he begins investigating the incident. After the task force finds out the truth, Cooper upbraids her for deceiving him and tells her to figure out whether her loyalties lie with Mossad or the FBI. She asks Aram out for a drink, but he turns her down, telling her he has had too many bad experiences with women he cannot trust. Later she meets with her ex-partner and sometimes lover Levi, but declines to resume their relationship, confessing to him that she is "in love with someone else".

In "Dembe Zuma" while trying to work together, Samar and Janet had a serious confrontation with the latter admitting that when she met Aram, he was just like Samar before she taught him how to have fun. She tells Samar that she knows about her feelings for Aram and would never admit it out of fear. Janet even points out that she is doing a poor job hiding it behind a disinterest and tough façade. Samar doesn't talk to Aram and leaves, apparently shaken by the fact Janet knew that she had feelings for him. In "Philomena", Samar interviews for a prestigious FBI fellowship. She is accepted but declines upon learning that Aram recommended her for the fellowship, believing he only did so out of guilt for not telling her about resuming his relationship with Janet.

In "Mr. Kaplan: Conclusion", Samar investigates Janet after Aram is imprisoned for failing to cooperate with a grand jury investigating the task force. She discovers Janet's criminal record was expunged in exchange for her persuading Aram to testify against the task force. She visits Aram in jail but chooses not to tell him about Janet's involvement after he says that Janet's support is keeping him sane. Later, Aram learns this and breaks up with Janet. He asks Samar why she kept silent. When she replies it was because Janet made him happy, he kisses her.

In "Lawrence Dane Devlin", Samar drowns after her kidnapping by a Blacklister. Samar calls Aram to say goodbye, telling Aram that if he had proposed, she would have accepted. Aram manages to find Samar in time to save her life; however, she is left on life support. According to Ressler, Samar went a long time without oxygen and all the doctors know for sure is that she cannot currently breathe on her own and may never be able to again. Despite this, Aram refuses to give up on her, playing the comatose Samar music and officially proposing to her before placing his grandmother's ring on her finger.

In "Sutton Ross", Samar awakens from her coma and accepts Aram's proposal.

Samar realizes the near-drowning has left her with permanent brain damage. After attempting to hide it from Aram and the Task Force, she realizes she can no longer continue her duties after she becomes incapacitated while pursuing Bastien Moreau. Rather than tell Cooper the truth, she resigns from the task force. It is revealed that she has vascular dementia and her condition will only deteriorate along with her memory.

In "The Osterman Umbrella Company", Samar overpowers the first assassin sent by the Mossad to exterminate her. She escapes with Aram only to be tracked down by the second group of Israelis, and Aram can call in support and stop the attack. Aram decides to stick with Samar and secures new passports from the task force, but she flees the country with the help of Red, leaving a devastated Aram behind.

=== Dembe Zuma ===
Portrayed by Hisham Tawfiq

Dembe Zuma (Blacklister number 10), Reddington's trusted and loyal bodyguard, driver, body man and confidant, is introduced as a Muslim former freedom fighter from South Sudan. It was assumed that he was Raymond Reddington's bodyguard. The episode "The Mombasa Cartel" revealed that he was born the youngest son of a farmer named Samwel Zuma. When he reported several low-ranking operatives of a poaching organization, the Mombasa Cartel, to the authorities, the cartel killed Dembe's father, mother, and siblings and sold him to human traffickers. At some point, he was being held by the Eberhardt Cartel. He spent eight years in the world of human trafficking and was enslaved until the age of 14 when Reddington found him half-dead and chained to a pipe in the basement of a brothel in Nairobi. Reddington took care of him, nursed him back to health, and made sure he got an education. Dembe eventually got a bachelor's degree in English Literature, learned to speak four languages fluently, and learned six others well enough to get by. Dembe rarely speaks and does not converse without being close to Reddington.

In "The Troll Farmer", it is revealed that Dembe has a daughter and a granddaughter whom Matias Solomon uses as leverage to force him to surrender to him. In "Eli Matchett" Dembe is further tortured by Solomon's associates for refusing to disclose Red's whereabouts. He later finds Mr. Vargas in the same situation, and the two team up to escape. However, Vargas betrays Dembe and shoots him. Dembe rescues Red and Liz from Solomon before collapsing from his injuries.

After Reddington shoots Mr. Kaplan and leaves her for dead in "Mato", Dembe's relationship with Reddington becomes increasingly strained. Eventually, he says to Liz that he no longer recognizes Reddington, and tells her he killed Mr. Kaplan. In "The Apothecary", Dembe disappears after apparently poisoning Reddington. It is later revealed that he was innocent but fled to find the true culprit. With Aram's help, he discovers that Mr. Kaplan was alive and was responsible.

In season 9, Dembe has become an FBI agent. His ways with Reddington have been split up, their friendship was over. In "The Skinner", he was hurt by an explosion and left in the hospital. He was visited by the Task Force, after which they decided to track the Skinner down and reunite with Red. In "The Skinner: Conclusion", he recovered and joined them as a fifth member.

The relationship between Dembe and Red are shown to decline throughout the season. In "The SPK", he arrested Robert Vesco, taking the opportunity to get Red's stolen 50 million dollars; on "Benjamin T. Okara", Reddington failed a meeting with Jovan Lović because of Dembe's membrane as an agent; In "Dr. Roberta Sand, PhD", it is revealed that Dembe betrayed Red and gave the letter about his identity to Liz, in direct contradiction to his instructions.

In "Boukman Baptiste", Dembe is asked to leave the group as Red wouldn’t be able to work with him anymore after what he had done, and what role in Liz’s death he had played. After Cooper rejects to complete his willing, it is revealed that Dembe managed to successfully run Red’s ruining empire for two years after he had vanished. Forced to put all his cards on a table, Dembe saves his job and continues the search of the man who sent VanDyke to kill Elizabeth.

In the series finale, Dembe is arrested for tipping Red off, but he refuses to escape with his old friend. While trying to defuse a tense situation, Dembe is shot in the neck by Congressman Arthur Hudson who is then immediately killed by Red. Thanks to Red getting Dembe treatment and donating his own blood, Dembe survives his wounds. However, while the Attorney General decides not to file charges against Dembe, he fires him from the FBI. Dembe tells Cooper that he had already decided to get out of a life where he is always in front of or behind guns and sadly reflects on the end of the Task Force, death and the adventure that they had all shared because of Red being in their lives.

=== Alina Park ===
Portrayed by Laura Sohn

A Special Agent with the FBI whom Liz interviews for a place on the Task Force. Reddington finds Alina bureaucratic and by-the-book, preferring Frankie instead. Alina has a secret from her time at the FBI office in Anchorage, which she refuses to reveal to Liz. Reddington deliberately sets out to disgust Alina, causing her to turn down the job. When Frankie takes Reddington, hostage, Alina pursues her and nearly stabs her to death. Seeing Alina's brutality, Reddington changes his mind and agrees to give her the position. Alina accepts, on the condition that she tells Liz what happened in Anchorage. It is later revealed Alina fell into disgrace in the Anchorage FBI after flouting the law to catch her mother's ex-boyfriend, whom she blamed for her mother's fatal overdose. Upon encountering this ex-boyfriend on her return to Anchorage, Alina chooses not to kill him and allows the police to arrest him instead.

During Season 8, Park hasn’t played any significant role for the series. She was more on Reddington’s side in the showdown between Red and Liz, because, as a newbie agent, she classified Liz just as a next criminal on the list who needs to be caught. In "Rakitin", she completes Reddington’s debt by murdering Rakitin using a high-class poison.

In the two years between the seasons, as of "The Conglomerate", Park had been working as an assassin with her probable love interest, but she gave up killing people six months before the events of season 9, after falling in love with one of her victims and leaving the business afterwards.

In "The Skinner", it is revealed that Park works in an FBI training school. She is married to Peter, who is not keen on her getting in danger and working as a field agent. But, as Dembe needs help in capturing a criminal, she is on her way despite Peter’s unwillingness. She secretly joins the reunited Task Force, but she couldn't keep her secret for too long, as Peter discovers that she had broken her trust in "The Skinner: Conclusion".

In "The Avenging Angel", while passing the drug test to return to the job, Ressler asks Park for help by giving her correct biomaterial to him, as his first own test contained the prohibited oxycodone, making it impossible to show the needed results. When Ressler passes the test, his analysis shows the wrong hormone level, leaving a possibility for Park to be having cancer. In "Benjamin T. Okara", while being under the attack of a powerful energetic weapon, Park got her tumor shredded, but after a short test conducted by Peter, it became obvious that Park had been pregnant all that time and now lost her embryo as a side effect. This puts her relationship with Peter at risk.

In "Laszlo Jancowics", Park comes to Aram for help. When he is filling in the annual report, she asks him not to mention her permanent headaches as she is afraid of losing her job and going off the field. Aram faithfully agrees to do so, but, when Alina stuns and loses the suspect in the recent crossfire due to her headache, she admits them happening and Aram posts it into the report, after which her position is strongly affected. In "Caelum Bank", she is removed from the field as the result of her constant headaches. Anticipating demotion by the FBI and the Task Force, she turns to Red seeking a way to be engaged with the investigations, but, after he refuses to help, she returns to the Task Force and accepts her new role in the team. Ironically, her visit with Red unintentionally helps him figure out the identity of Liz's killer, and Park herself figures out their identity shortly after. After discovering that she's pregnant and solving Liz's murder, Park decides to leave the task force.

== Main characters featured in The Blacklist: Redemption ==
=== Susan Hargrave ===
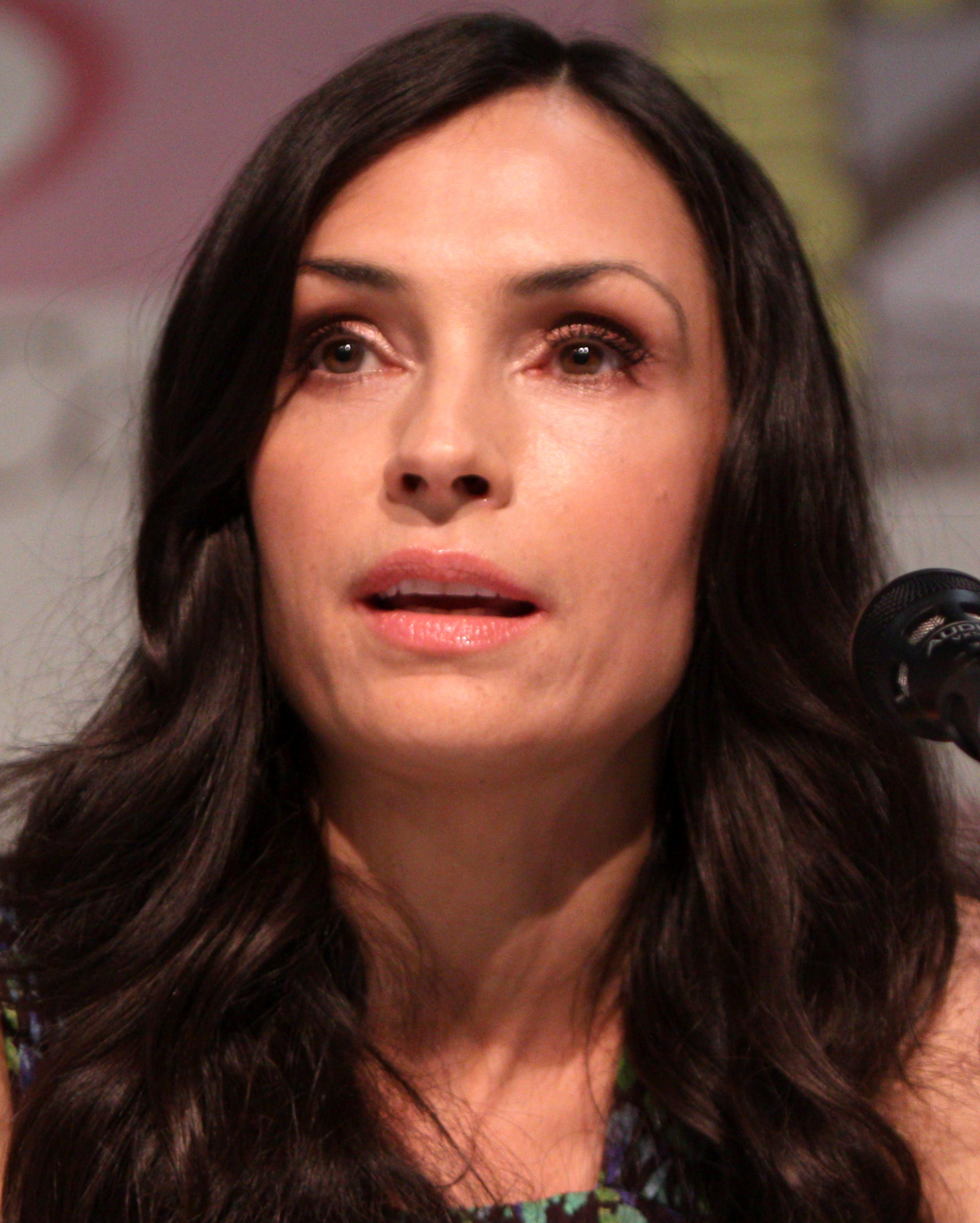
Famke Janssen first portrayed Susan Hargrave during season 3 of the main series

Portrayed by Famke Janssen

Susan "Scottie" Hargrave (Blacklister No. 18) is the co-head of Halcyon Aegis, a secretive military intelligence firm. She has an estranged husband, Howard, who is an old friend of Reddington. She is also Tom Keen's mother though to her he's been missing for twenty-eight years and she doesn't know what happened to him.

Tom Keen photographed her meeting with Cynthia Panabaker. After learning she was involved with Elizabeth Keen's death, Reddington attacks Hargrave's operations to force her to meet with him. She agrees, setting a trap for him. Reddington is alerted to the trap by Tom, and turns the tables, capturing Hargrave instead. She denies any responsibility for Liz's death but reveals that she was contracted to capture Liz by a man named Alexander Kirk. Reddington then proposes a temporary alliance with her.

Hargrave, Solomon, and Nez Rowan team up with Reddington, Tom, and the task force to steal $300 million from Senator Diaz, a presidential candidate who is being bankrolled by Kirk, in an attempt to draw Kirk out. Impressed by Tom's skills, she offers to hire him as an employee of Halcyon.

In "Ruin", Hargrave returns to visit a newly widowed Liz, having been exonerated for the crimes her husband framed her for through Tom's testimony. She takes temporary custody of Agnes while Liz deals with her anger and grief.

=== Nez Rowan ===
Portrayed by Tawny Cypress

A mercenary who works for Susan Hargrave. Nez has struggled with addiction before and during the series she relapses.

=== Matias Solomon ===
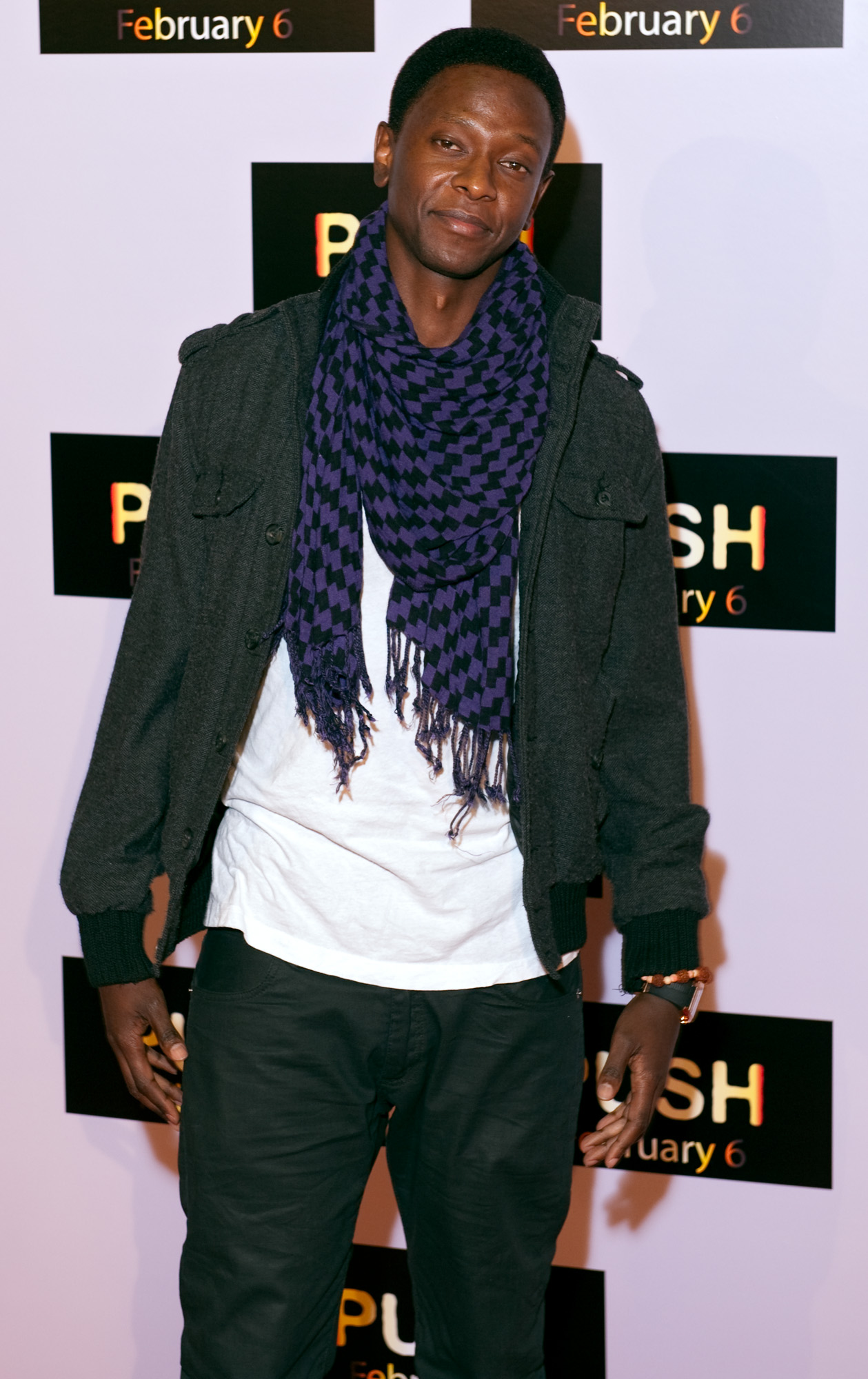
Edi Gathegi first portrayed Matias Solomon during season 3 of the main series

Portrayed by Edi Gathegi

Matias Solomon (Blacklister No. 32) is a high-ranking Cabal operative. He was formerly a CIA asset in Ethiopia, working with Laurel Hitchin, but the agency ended its relationship with him when he proved to be too brutal even for them. He is soft-spoken and courteous but highly sadistic, with a predilection for torturing his victims. He also tends to leave his men to die while he escapes.

In "The Troll Farmer", he takes Dembe's granddaughter hostage and uses her to capture Dembe. He visits Peter Kotsiopulos' office as a representative of the Cabal, reprimanding the Director for his inability to prevent Reddington from releasing the Fulcrum and threatening that continued failure would mean his life. He viciously tortures Dembe for information on Reddington's location but fails to break him. Through a deception involving Mr. Vargas, Solomon finally tricks Dembe into revealing the information and captures Reddington and Liz. However, Dembe rescues them and drives Solomon off. In "Sir Crispin Crandall", while trying to fire at Red and Liz, he finds himself trapped with all of the most intelligent people in cryogenics. Solomon visits Peter again and warns him of his position in the Cabal. Peter then reprimands him for trying to revolt and forces Solomon's cooperation. In "Zal Bin Hassan" Solomon traces Tom down to Wing Yee in the hopes of ambushing Liz and Tom but instead is caught by the FBI. During interrogation, the Director tortures Solomon by forcing him to swallow fishhooks, a ruse intended to convince the FBI that the Director is not in league with him. Solomon is then released.

Later, Solomon leads an assault team to kill Karakurt, who is being held by Tom Keen, Cooper, and Ressler. He captures Tom at gunpoint and demands that Ressler hand Karakurt over. However, Cooper knocks him out from behind, and Ressler arrests him.

While being transported by federal agents, Solomon is rescued by an unknown person driving a Rolls-Royce. Then, working for Susan Hargrave, he plots to steal a nuclear weapon. This plot turns out to be a decoy to divert the FBI's attention from his real mission: capturing Liz Keen. He and his men surround the church where Liz and Tom are about to be married and demand that Liz come with them or they will kill everyone else and take her by force. However, Reddington, Tom, and the task force members can fend off Solomon's men long enough for Ressler to come to the rescue, allowing Liz and Tom to escape. He chases Liz again after her escape and hunts her ambulance as Red tries to take her to the hospital to save her life. Solomon can disable Red's vehicle and pins him and his men down. Eventually FBI backup arrives and Solomon flees as his men are killed. However, the delay in getting to the hospital caused by Solomon's attack causes Liz to apparently die due to complications during childbirth.

In "Alexander Kirk", Solomon and Tom are forced to work together in an operation to take down Blacklister Alexander Kirk who had orchestrated the attack on Liz. During the mission, Tom and Solomon rob a pharmacy together and Tom shoots Solomon in the gut in revenge for the attempt on Liz's life. Minutes later the police enter to find a pool of blood but no sign of Solomon himself.

Solomon is later revealed to have survived in The Blacklist: Redemption and continues working as an operative for Susan Hargrave’s private military organization, Halcyon Aegis. In the series premiere, Solomon participates in a covert extraction operation in Syria alongside Tom Keen and Nez Rowan. He remains affiliated with Halcyon Aegis throughout the series and is involved in multiple international missions conducted on behalf of private clients and government entities. During the season, Solomon assists in operations involving the recovery of kidnapped individuals, intelligence retrieval, and the neutralization of high-value targets. He works directly under Susan Hargrave and frequently accompanies Tom Keen on field assignments despite their prior conflict. As the internal dispute between Susan Hargrave and her husband Howard Hargrave intensifies, Solomon supports Susan’s leadership of Halcyon Aegis. He participates in operations connected to Howard’s return and the struggle for control of the organization. In the series finale, Solomon remains aligned with Susan Hargrave following the exposure of Howard’s activities.

== The Blacklist ==
The Blacklist is a list of criminals that Raymond Reddington has compiled in his illegal business dealings. Names on the list are criminals that the FBI does not have overwhelming evidence against, therefore they have never been caught. Some criminals are unknown to the FBI, or have avoided leaving behind the needed evidence for a conviction, or live a high-profile public life whilst concealing their criminal behavior. It was operated from a fictive company Evelyn in Washington, D.C. with affiliates around the world, communicating by fax. The list contains 200 criminals, of which the highest order belongs to Elizabeth Keen, while the lowest numeral is kept by Sean Bane a.k.a. The Hyena. Of 200 numbers, 12 numbers were never filled, 3 blacklisters were not given a number and 2 blacklisters shared the same number.

The list is truly international with at least several members from Serbia, China, Russia, Germany, United Kingdom, Japan, Iran, Uzbekistan, etc., in addition to those from the United States and international organizations. There are also members marked with a symbol, whose country of origin was never determined throughout the series.

The numbers on The Blacklist (e. g. Elizabeth Keen, No. 1, Katarina Rostova, No. 3, Mr. Kaplan, No. 4, Dembe Zuma, No. 10) determine the danger the criminal may cause on Elizabeth, as was revealed in "Nachalo". Also, the numbers reflect the importance of the Blacklisters on the show's major storylines.

Various Blacklisters are also (or used to be) members of the Cabal.

The Blacklister was introduced in a comic book.

Raymond Reddington's Blacklist
No.	Blacklister(s)	Origin	Career	Status	Actor(s)	Appearance
00	Raymond "Red" Reddington	(United States)	Confidential informant, FBI; Father of Elizabeth Keen	Deceased	James Spader	The Blacklist (regular (seasons 1-10))
1	Elizabeth Keen; Masha Rostova	(United States) (Russia)	Former FBI Agent; Daughter of Katarina Rostova and Raymond Reddington	Deceased	Megan Boone	The Blacklist (regular (seasons 1-8))
3	Katarina Rostova	(Soviet Union) (Russia)	Former Russian spy; Biological mother of Elizabeth Keen	Active	Lotte Verbeek as young Katarina Rostova	"Cape May" (flashback); "Mato" (flashback); "Miles McGrath" (flashback); "Requiem" (flashback); "Rassvet" (flashback); "Nachalo" (flashback)
3	Tatiana Petrova	(Russia) (United States)	Body double of Katarina Rostova; Former Reddington’s cooperator	Deceased	Laila Robins	"Robert Diaz"; Season 7 (recurring); "Roanoke"; "Katarina Rostova: Conclusion"; "Nachalo" (flashback)
4	Kathryn Nemec; Mr. Kaplan	(United States)	Raymond Reddington's cleaner; Former nanny to Liz	Unknown	Susan Blommaert in present day Joanna P. Adler in flashbacks	The Blacklist (recurring (seasons 1-4)); "Misère"
5	Ivan Stepanov; Eastern Friend	(Russia)	SVR Agent; Reddington's handler	Active	David E. Harrison	"Elizabeth Keen"; "Chemical Mary"; "Captain Kidd"; "Rakitin"; "The Russian Knot"; "Nicholas Obenrader"; "Ivan Stepanov"; "Nachalo" (flashback)
6	The Osterman Umbrella Company	(United States)	Organisation of Contract Assassins	Active	Various Actors	"The Osterman Umbrella Company"
7	Tom Keen (also known as Jacob Phelps, born Christopher Hargrave)	(United States)	Covert operative; Assassin; Former employee of the Major; Former agent of Milos Kirchoff; Double-agent of Raymond Reddington	Deceased	Ryan Eggold	The Blacklist (regular (seasons 1-5)); The Blacklist: Redemption (regular)
8	Milos Kirchoff; Berlin	(Russia)	Former Colonel of the USSR; Leader of his own syndicate	Deceased	Peter Stormare	"Berlin"; "Berlin Conclusion"; "Lord Baltimore"; "Monarch Douglas Bank"; "The Scimitar"; "The Decembrist"
9	Robert Vesco	(United States)	Confidence Trick Man; Thief; Drug Smuggler; Investor; Mentor of Raymond Reddington; Leader of the Supremo Priori Knighthood	Deceased	Stacy Keach	"Robert Vesco"; "The SPK"; "The Four Guns"; "The Hyena"; "The Dockery Affair"; "Dr. Laken Perillos. Conclusion"
10	Dembe Zuma	(South Sudan) (Sierra Leone) (United States) (Note: Dembe is introduced as being from South Sudan, although in Series 2 Episode 6 he is said to be from Sierra Leone)	Bodyguard and adoptive son of Raymond Reddington	Active	Hisham Tawfiq	The Blacklist (recurring (seasons 1-2); main (seasons 3-10))
11	Thomas Connolly; Smiling Tommy	(United States)	The United States Assistant Attorney General; United States Attorney General; Member of the Cabal	Deceased	Reed Birney	"The Judge"; "The Kenyon Family"; "T. Earl King IV"; "Tom Keen"; "The Longevity Initiative"; "Leonard Caul"; "Quon Zhang"; "Karakurt"; "Tom Connolly"
12	Alan Fitch; The Decembrist	(United States)	Assistant Director of National Intelligence; Member of the Cabal	Deceased	Alan Alda	"Anslo Garrick Conclusion"; "The Good Samaritan"; "The Kingmaker"; "Berlin Conclusion"; "The Decembrist"
13	Ian Garvey	(United States)	US Marshall; Drug dealer	Deceased	Jonny Coyne	"The Kilgannon Corporation"; "Ian Garvey"; "The Informant"; "The Cook"; "The Invisible Hand"; "Mr. Raleigh Sinclair III"; "Pattie Sue Edwards"; "The Capricorn Killer"; "Anna-Gracia Duerte"; "Zarak Mosadek"; "Ian Garvey: Conclusion"
14	Alexander Kirk (born Constantin Rostov)	(Russia)	Black market financer; Numerous mining operations; Enemy of Raymond Reddington	Active	Ulrich Thomsen	"Alexander Kirk"; "Alexander Kirk Conclusion"; "Esteban"; "Mato"; "Miles McGrath"; "Gaia"; "The Lindquist Concern"; "The Thrushes"; "Dr. Adrian Shaw"; "Dr. Adrian Shaw: Conclusion"; "Nachalo" (flashback)
15	Robert Diaz	(United States)	President of the United States	Active	Benito Martinez	"Susan Hargrave"; "Alexander Kirk"; "Alexander Kirk: Conclusion"; "Lipet's Seafood Company"; "Bastien Moreau"; "Bastien Moreau: Conclusion"; "Anna McMahon"; "Robert Diaz"
16	Anslo Garrick	(United Kingdom)	Mercenary; Specialist in raiding maximum security sites	Deceased	Ritchie Coster	"Anslo Garrick"; "Anslo Garrick Conclusion"
17	Sutton Ross; Max Birmingham	(United Kingdom)	Corporate spy; Thief	Deceased	Julian Sands	"Lawrence Dane Devlin; "Sutton Ross"
18	Susan Scott Hargrave	(United States)	Manager of Halcyon Aegis; Operative of the Artax Network	Active	Famke Janssen	The Blacklist; "Susan Hangrave"; "Alexander Kirk"; "Isabella Stone"; "Ruin"; The Blacklist: Redemption (series regular)
19	Dr. Sharon Fulton	(United States)	Serial Killer; Federal Bureau of Investigation Psychiatrist	Active	Martha Plimpton	"Mr. Raleigh Sinclair III"; "The Capricorn Killer"
20	Bastien Moreau; The Corsican	(France)	Assassin; Nationalist	Deceased	Christopher Lambert	"Dr. Hans Koehler"; "The Corsican"; "Bastien Moreau"; "Bastien Moreau: Conclusion"
21	Luther Todd Braxton	(United States)	Former soldier of the Gulf War; Thief	Deceased	Ron Perlman	"Luther Braxton"; "Luther Braxton Conclusion"
22	The Scimitar; Walid Abu Sitta/Dr. Daniel Rivera	(Iran)	Assassin	Deceased	Waleed Zuaiter	"The Scimitar"
23	Zarak Mosadek	(Islamic Republic of Afghanistan)	Heroin Supplier; Deputy Minister of Narcotics of Afghanistan	Deceased	Bernard White	"Zarak Mosadek"; "Ian Garvey: Conclusion"
24	Peter Kotsiopulos; The Director	(United States)	Director of the CIA's National Clandestine Service (NCS); One of the Cabal's leaders	Deceased	David Strathairn	"Luther Braxton"; "Luther Braxton: Conclusion"; "Vanessa Cruz"; "Leonard Caul"; "Quon Zhang"; "Tom Connolly"; "The Troll Farmer"; "Arioch Cain"; "Sir Crispin Crandall"; "Zal Bin Hasaan"; "The Director"; "The Director: Conclusion"
25	Anna-Gracia Duerte	(Brazil)	Child Bride; Assassin; Guardian Angel	Captured	Jearnest Corchado	"Anna-Gracia Duerte"
26	Lawrence Dane Devlin	(United States)	Serial Killer; Abductor; Thanatologist	Deceased	Pruitt Taylor Vince	"Nicholas T. Moore"; "Lawrence Dane Devlin"
27	Louis T. Steinhil	(United States)	Confidence Artist	Deceased	David Meunier	"Louis T. Steinhil"; "Louis T. Steinhil: Conclusion"
28	Andrew Patterson; Rakitin	(United States)	Russian Spy; Double Agent; Hacker	Deceased	Seth Numrich	"Elizabeth Keen"; "The Cyranoid"; "Captain Kidd"; "Rakitin"
29	Bogdan Ivanovich Krilov	(Russia)	Memory Doctor; Employee of Mr. Kaplan	Captured	Rade Serbedzija	"Dr. Bogdan Krilov"; "Katarina Rostova"
30	Joe Putnum	(United States)	Thief; Accountant; Logistics expert	Deceased	Michael Aronov	"Smokey Putnum"; "Miss Rebecca Thrall"; "Pattie Sue Edwards"; "Nicholas T. Moore"; "Lawrence Dane Devlin"; "Lady Luck"
31	Zal Bin Hassan (born Shahin Navabi)	(Iran)	Brother of Samar Navabi; Bomber; Kidnapper	Captured	Sammy Sheik	"Zal Bin Hassan"
32	Matias Solomon	(Ethiopia)	Former CIA agent; Operative of the Cabal	Active	Edi Gathegi	The Blacklist; "The Troll Farmer"; "Marvin Gerard"; "Eli Matchett"; "Arioch Cain"; "Sir Crispin Crandall"; "Zal Bin Hasaan"; "Kings of the Highway"; "The Director"; "Mr. Solomon"; "Mr. Solomon Conclusion"; "Alexander Kirk"; The Blacklist: Redemption (series regular)
33	Dr. Hans Koehler	(Germany)	Plastic surgeon	Deceased	Kenneth Tigar	"Dr. Hans Koehler"
34	Judith Pruitt; Isabella Stone	(United States)	Character assassin; Contract assassin; Several legitimate cover occupations	Captured	Melora Hardin	"Isabella Stone"; "The Architect"
35	Mia Collins; The Cyranoid	(United States)	Doppelganger	Active	Mara Davi	"The Cyranoid"
36	Rhys Engel; The Protean		Contract assassin	Deceased	Elan Zafir	"The Protean"
37	Greyson Blaise	(United Kingdom)	Art thief; Billionaire	Captured	Owain Yeoman	"Greyson Blaise"
38	Bo Chang; The Troll Farmer	(United States)	Information warfare; Cyberwarfare; Psychological warfare	Active	Aaron Yoo	"The Troll Farmer"; "The Troll Farmer: Pt. 2"; "The Troll Farmer: Pt. 3"
39	Blair Foster	(United States)	Fixer; Private lawyer; Corruption kingpin	Active	Francie Swift	"Blair Foster"
40	Ogden Greeley	(United States)	Defence Contractor; Black Market Information Dealer	Captured	Christopher Kelly	"Ogden Greeley"
41	Artax Network	(United States)	Network of communications satellites	Active	Murphy Guyer	"Mr. Solomon Conclusion"; "The Artax Network"
42	The Kingmaker; Paul Fredrick Smithson/Malcom Royce	(United Kingdom)	Consultant on Public Relations (Spin Doctor); Political strategy; Opposition research	Deceased	Linus Roache	"The Kingmaker"
43	Nasim Bakhash; The Djinn (born Nasir Bakhash)	(Iran)	Transsexual; Owner of a vengeance/revenge network; Owner of Azeri Financial; Owner of Newcastle Venture Group	Captured	Christine Tawfiq	"The Djinn"
44	Nirah Ahmad; The Endling	(Syria)	Member of Syrian Free Army; Mother; Murderer	Deceased	Poorna Jagannathan	"The Endling"
45	Graeme Anderson; The Skinner	(United States)	Sociopath; Handler; Owner of Skinner Resources	Deceased	Patrick Murney	"The Skinner"; "The Skinner: Conclusion"
46	Edgar Grant; The Debt Collector	(United States)	Sociopath; Mercenary for revenge	Deceased	Wade Williams	"The Debt Collector"
47	Frederick Barnes	(United States)	Scientist; Biological terrorist; Chemical terrorist	Deceased	Robert Sean Leonard	"Frederick Barnes"
48	Arthur Kilgannon; Leader of the Kilgannon Corporation	(Republic of Ireland)	Human Smuggler	Deceased	Nick Tate	"The Kilgannon Corporation"
49	Michaela Bellucci; The Avenging Angel	(Italy)	Murderer	Deceased	Annabella Sciorra	"The Avenging Angel"
50	Blair; Arioch Cain	(United States)	Seeker of revenge; Enemy of Karakurt and the Cabal; Future ally of Elizabeth Keen	Active	Olivia Boreham-Wing	"Arioch Cain"
51	Raleigh Sinclair III; The Alibi	(United Kingdom)	Alibi Agent	Active	John Noble	"Mr. Raleigh Sinclair III"; "Ian Garvey: Conclusion"
52	Ranko Zamani	(Serbia)	Terrorist; Kidnapper; Mass murderer; Terminally ill	Deceased	Jamie Jackson	"Pilot"
53	The Thrushes	(Bulgaria)	Hacker collective	Captured	Various actors	"The Thrushes"
54	Leon Cox; Ilyas Surkov	(United States)	CIA agent; Terrorist; Organiser of false flag operations	Active	Fredric Lehne	"Ilyas Surkov"
55	Karakurt	(Russia)	Foreign Intelligence Service assassin; Terrorist; Member the Cabal	Captured	Michael Massee; Andrew Divoff	"Quon Zhang"; "Karakurt"; "Tom Connolly"; "Sir Crispin Crandall"; "Zal Bin Hassan"; "Kings of the Highway"; "The Director"; "The Director: Conclusion"
56	Thomas Owen Wattles; The Cook	(United States)	Arsonist; Serial Killer; Former Priest	Deceased	Michael Rogers	"The Cook"
57	Ruth Suzanne Kipling; The Judge	(United States)	Vigilante; Founder of the Amnesty Collective; Enemy of both Thomas Connolly and Harold Cooper	Captured	Dianne Wiest	"The Judge"
58	Marko Jankovics; Sárkany (hun. The Dragon)	(Hungary)	Smuggler; Drug lord; Father to Lazslo Jancowics	Deceased	Arnold Vosloo	"Marko Jankovics"
59	Asa Hightower; The Apothecary	(United States)	Manufacturer of toxins; Poison expert; Pharmaco toxicologist	Captured	Jamie Harrold	"The Apothecary"
60	Anna McMahon	(United States)	Presidential advisor; Assistant United States attorney general	Deceased	Jennifer Ferrin	"The Corsican"; "Bastien Moreau"; "Bastien Moreau: Conclusion"; "Olivia Olson"; "The Third Estate"; "Guillermo Rizal"; "Anna McMahon"; "Robert Diaz"
61	Philomena	(United States)	Bounty Hunter; Employee of Mr. Kaplan	Captured	Susan Misner	"Philomena"
62	Leonard Caul (born Joseph McCray)	(United States)	A key figure of Reddington's past; Former CIA spy; A man who knows the Fulcrum; Member of the Cabal; Ally to Reddington	Active	Ned van Zandt	"The Kenyon Family"; "The Deer Hunter"; "Leonard Caul"; "Quon Zhang"; "Karakurt"; "Tom Connolly"; "The Djinn"
63	The Invisible Hand	(United States)	Vigilante Organization	Captured	Various actors	"The Invisible Hand"
64	Owen Mallory (born Michael Shaw)	(United States)	CEO of the Cyprus Adoption Agency	Captured	Campbell Scott	"The Cyprus Agency"
65	Miles McGrath	(United States)	Angel investor; Black market financier; Crime incubator; Venture capitalist	Captured	Tate Ellington	"Miles McGrath"
66	Mato	(United States)	Mercenary; Skip tracer; Hunter; Bounty hunter; Tracker	Deceased	Raoul Trujillo	"Alexander Kirk: Conclusion"; "Esteban"; "Mato"
67	Ruslan Denisov	(Uzbekistan)	Senior member of the Supreme Republic of a Free, Righteous and Independent Uzbekistan (SRU)	Active	Faran Tahir	"Ruslan Denisov"
68	Patricia Sue Edwards	(United States)	United States Army Medical; Research Institute of Infectious Diseases; United States Army captain Biochemist; Biological Terrorist	Captured	Liza J. Bennett	"Pattie Sue Edwards"
69	Agathe Tyche; Lady Luck	(United States)	Debt collector; Serial killer	Captured	Mary Pat Gleason	"Lady Luck"
70	Laken Perillos	(United States)	Interrogator; Torture Specialist	Deceased	Laverne Cox	"Dr. Laken Perillos"; "Dr. Laken Perillos. Conclusion"
71	Justin Kenyon	(United States)	Religious polygamist; Leader of the Church of the Shield; Fence for criminals	Deceased	Stephen Bogardus	"The Kenyon Family"
72	Eli Matchett; Leader of Los Segadores	(United States)	Former farmer; Agricultural terrorist	Captured	Donald Patrick Harvey	"Eli Matchett"
73	Madeline Pratt	(United States)	Thief; Con artist; Several legitimate cover occupations	Active	Jennifer Ehle	"Madeline Pratt"; "T. Earl King VI"
74	Maddox Beck; Leader of the Front	(United States)	Eco-terrorist with a messiah complex; Co-founder and leader of the Front	Deceased	Michael Laurence	"The Front"
75	The Major	(United States)	Leader of black market; Finishing school	Deceased	Lance Henriksen	"T. Earl King VI"; "The Major"; "The Longevity Initiative"; "Mr.Solomon"; "Ian Garvey"
76	Rebecca Thrall	(United States)	Insurance policy fraud; Assassin	Captured	Sarah Wynter	"Miss Rebecca Thrall"
77	Lady Ambrosia	(United States)	Child kidnapper	Deceased	Celia Weston	"Lady Ambrosia"
78	Albert Janus; The Caretaker	(United States)	Record keeper for black market	Captured	Reg E. Cathey	"The Caretaker"
79	Manuel Orentez Esteban	(Chile)	Spymaster; Double agent; War criminal; Human rights violator; Former death squad leader during Augusto Pinochet's dictatorship	Captured	Paul Calderon	"Esteban"
80	Marvin Gerard	(United States)	Lawyer; Shadow counsel; Criminal empire’s accountant; Composer of murder of Elizabeth Keen	Deceased	Fisher Stevens	"Marvin Gerard"; "Sir Crispin Crandall"; "The Director: Conclusion"; "The Apothecary"; "Philomena"; "The Debt Collector"; "16 Ounces"; "Elizabeth Keen"; "Boukman Baptiste"; "Arcane Wireless"; "Andrew Kennison"; "Caelum Bank"; "Marvin Gerard: Conclusion Pt. 1"; "Marvin Gerard: Conclusion Pt. 2"
81	Owen Ayers; Gaia	(United States)	Eco-terrorist; Ex-Navy pilot	Deceased	Louis Cancelmi	"Gaia"
82	Dr. Linus Creel	(United States)	Psychiatrist; Psychologist	Deceased	David Costabile	"Dr. Linus Creel"
83	Mako Tanida	(Japan)	Yakuza crime lord; Enemy of Donald Ressler	Deceased	Hoon Lee	"Mako Tanida"
84	Wujing	(China)	Hacker; Spy killer; Keeper of The Blacklist	Deceased	Chin Han	"Wujing"; "Marvin Gerard: Conclusion Pt. 2"; Season 10 (recurring)
85	Tommy Phelps; The Courier	(United States)	Courier	Deceased	Robert Knepper	"The Courier"
86	Sir Crispin Crandall	(United States)	Bio-chemist; Owner of Crandall Cryonics	Deceased	Harris Yulin	"Sir Crispin Crandall"
87	Quon Zhang	(China)	Smuggler; Part-time associate of the Cabal	Captured	Ron Yuan	"Quon Zhang"
88	Ivan	(Russia)	Hacker	Active	Mark Ivanir	"Ivan"
89	Dr. James Covington	(United States)	Surgeon; Black market with human organs	Captured	Ron Cephas Jones	"Dr. James Covington"
90	Calvin Dawson	(United States)	Assassin for hire; Member of the Travel Agency	Deceased	Kevin J. O'Connor	"The Travel Agency"
91	Gerald Todd Klepper; The Ethicist	(United States)	Assassin; Black Market Actuary; Doctor	Deceased	Frank Wood	"The Ethicist"
92	Kimberly Owens; The Brockton College Killer	(United States)	Serial killer; Podcast author	Captured	Sarah Nicole Deaver	"The Brockton College Killer"
93	Tracy Solobotkin; The Deer Hunter II	(United States)	Accountant for WhiteHaven Shelters; Vigilante killer; Ex-wife and delusional copycat-turned-successor of the original Deer Hunter killer	Captured	Amanda Plummer	"The Deer Hunter"
94	T. Earl King VI	(United States)	Sixth generation Tetrach of the King family; Leader of a black market auction	Deceased	Jeffrey DeMunn	"T. Earl King VI"
95	Gregory Devry	(United States)	Con man; Old friend of Reddington	Deceased	Jake Weber	"Mr. Gregory Devry"
96	William Benedict; Captain Kidd	(United States)	Black Market Middle Man; Smuggler	Deceased	Noah Robbins	"Captain Kidd"
97	Roger Hobbs	(United States)	Owner of the Longevity Initiative; Owner of Sadovo Solutions; Member of the Cabal	Deceased	Ralph Brown	"The Longevity Initiative"; "Vanessa Cruz"
98	Dr. Adrian Shaw (Born Sonia Bloom)	(United States)	Scientist	Unknown	Linda Emond	"Dr. Adrian Shaw"; "Dr. Adrian Shaw: Conclusion"
99	Jordan Loving; Minister D	(United States)	Blackmailer	Captured	Stephen Spinella	"Minister D"
100	Abraham J. Stern	(United States)	Loan officer; Thief	Captured	Nathan Lane	"Abraham Stern"
101	Eric Trettel; The Alchemist	(United States)	Geneticist; Expert on DNA alteration	Deceased	Ryan O'Nan	"The Alchemist"
102	Margot Rochet; Leader of the Harem	(United States)	Leader of a female elite heist crew called "The Harem".	Captured	Jill Hennessy	"The Harem"
103	Alistair Pitt; The Promnestria/The Matchmaker	(United States)	Head of the Promnestria	Deceased	Tony Shalhoub	"Alistair Pitt"
104	Nora Mills; Lord Baltimore	(United States)	Mercenary; Hacker; Skiptracer	Captured	Krysten Ritter	"Lord Baltimore"
105	Silas Gouldsberry; Member of the Lindquist Concern	(United States)	Patent lawyer; Employee in the United States Patent Office; Assassin of the Lindquist Concern	Deceased	Adam Godley	"The Lindquist Concern"
106	Karl Hoffman; The Good Samaritan	(United States)	Locum nurse; Vigilante; Serial killer	Deceased	Frank Whaley	"The Good Samaritan"
107	The Architect	(United States)	Criminal mastermind who designs and executes the perfect crime	Deceased	Brent Spiner	"The Architect"
108	The Kings of the Highway	(United States)	Gang of robbers	Active	Various actors	"Kings of the Highway"
109	Nathaniel Wolff; General Ludd	(Germany)	Anti-capitalist terrorist; Economic terrorist	Captured	Justin Kirk	"General Ludd"
110	Nicholas Tyler Moore	(United States)	Author; Cult Leader	Deceased	Bob Gunton	"Nicholas T. Moore"; "Lawrence Dane Devlin"
111	Lipet's Seafood Company	(United States)	Front for New Martyr's Brigade	Active	Various actors	"Lipet's Seafood Company"
112	Monarch Douglas Bank	(Poland)	Bank for international crime	Active	Various actors	"Monarch Douglas Bank"
113	Reginald Turner; Drexel	(United States)	Former teacher; Underground protester; Performance artist; Serial killer	Captured	Daniel London	"Drexel"
114	Geoff Perl; Leader of the Mombasa Cartel	(United States)	Leader of the Mombasa cartel; CEO of Deckerd Capital	Deceased	Peter Fonda	"The Mombasa Cartel"
115	Olivia Olson	(United Kingdom)	Blackmailer; Corporate raider; Specialist in hostile takeovers of companies	Active	Joanna Christie	"Olivia Olson"
116	Dr. Jonathan Nikkila; General Shiro	(United States)	Entomologist; Chemist; Genetic engineer; Biological terrorist	Deceased	Mark Linn-Baker	"General Shiro"
117	Vanessa Anne Cruz	(United States)	Confidence trick woman	Active	Ana de la Reguera	"Vanessa Cruz"
118	Howard Ray Bishop; The Informant	(United States)	Informant; Political aide; Dealer; Client of Henry Prescott	Captured	Robert Eli	"The Informant"
119	Pavlovich brothers	(Serbia)	Specialists in kidnapping and extraction	Deceased	Goran Ivanovski	"Pilot"; "The Pavlovich Brothers"
120	Pavlovich brothers	(Serbia)	Specialists in kidnapping and extraction	Deceased	Renne Gjoni	"Pilot"; "The Pavlovich Brothers"
121	Pavlovich brothers	(Serbia)	Specialists in kidnapping and extraction	Deceased	James Biberi	"Pilot"; "The Pavlovich Brothers"
122	Pavlovich brothers	(Serbia)	Specialists in kidnapping and extraction	Deceased	Stivi Paskoski	"Pilot"; "The Pavlovich Brothers"
123	Ethan Donovan; The Arsonist		Arson Expert; Specialist cleaner	Deceased	—N/a	"The Arsonist"
124	Dr. Spalding Stark; The Pharmacist	(United States)	Pharmacist; Genetics Expert	Active	David Wilson Barnes	"The Pharmacist"
125	Hannah Hayes	(United States)	Abductor; Doctor; Incubator; Rape Victim; Feminist	Captured	Stacey Roca	"Hannah Hayes"
126	Twamie Ullulaq	(Alaska)	Abductor; Counterterrorism expert; Hijacker	Captured	Michael Horse	"Twamie Ullulaq"
127	The Colonel; Director of the Wellstone Agency	(Germany)	Director of a translation service for criminals	Active	Bob Hiltermann	"The Wellstone Agency"
128	Guillermo Rizal	(United States)	Child abductor; Genetic engineer	Captured	Joel de la Fuente	"Guillermo Rizal"
129	Balthazar Baker	(United States)	Underground network owner; Transporter	Deceased	Mike Starr	"Balthazar “Bino” Baker"
130	Dr. Lewis Powell	(United States)	Software engineer; Creator of an Artificial Intelligence Known as Clark	Deceased	Wayne Pyle	"Dr. Lewis Powell"
131	Alter Ego	(United States)	Company that hires actors; Confidence trick artists	Active	Various Actors	"Alter Ego"
132	Cardinal Richards; Leader of the Vehm	(United States)	Cardinal in a Catholic church; Member of the Vehm, an order of anti-pedophile vigilantes; Money launderer	Deceased	Michael Cullen	"The Vehm"
133	Nicholas Obenrader	(United States)	Criminal Consultant	Active	Nick Westrate	"Nicholas Obenrader"
135	Milton Bobbit; The Undertaker	(United States)	Insurance company employee; Terminally ill patient; Assassin	Deceased	Damian Young	"Milton Bobbit"
136	Noel Gerrick; Leader of the Third Estate	(United States)	Anti-capitalist terrorists; Kidnapper	Captured	Mark Elliot Wilson	"The Third Estate"
137	Victoria Fenberg	(United States)	Art Forger	Active	Gillian Alexy	"Victoria Fenberg"
138	Norman Devane	(United States)	Biological terrorist; Contract assassin	Deceased	Jefferson Mays	"Norman Devane"
139	Santiago Vega; Roanoke	(United States)	Extraction Specialist	Deceased	Héctor González	"Roanoke"
140	Abraham Moores; Founder of the Fribourg Confidence	(United States)	Thief	Active	Frankie R. Faison	"The Fribourg Confidence"
141	Godwin Page	(United States)	Neville Townsend's right-hand man	Active	Christopher Gurr	"The Cyranoid"; "Dr. Laken Perillos"; "Nicholas Obenrader"; "Ivan Stepanov"; "Godwin Page"
142	John Richter	(United States)	Assassin under The Conglomerate; Park’s ex-love interest	Deceased	Will Stout	"The Conglomerate"
143	Mary Bremmer; Chemical Mary	(United States)	Chemical weapons broker	Deceased	Francesca Faridany	"Chemical Mary"; "The Cyranoid"
144	Newton Purcell	(United States)	Murderer; Sound expert	Captured	Bryce Pinkham	"Newton Purcell"
145	Alban Veseli; The Freelancer; The Night Owl		Assassin	Active	Daniel Sauli	"The Freelancer"; "The Fribourg Confidence"; "Chemical Mary"; Season 10 (recurring)
146	Delaine Uhlman	(United States)	Pawnshop owners; Black market financiers	Deceased	Dorothy Lyman	"The Pawnbrokers"
147	Rod Uhlman	(United States)	Pawnshop owners; Black market financiers	Captured	Larry Bryggman	"The Pawnbrokers"
148	Leon Kiklinski; The Lobbyist		Terrorist for hire	Deceased	—N/a	"The Lobbyist"
149	Nyle Hatcher; The Boneyard Killer	(United States)	Serial Killer; Blackmailer; Confidence trick artist; Mortician; Forensics expert	Captured	Sean Bridgers	"Nyle Hatcher"
150	Roy Cain	(United States)	Warden; Criminal Contractor	Deceased	Tom Wopat	"Roy Cain"
151	Thelonius Prackett	(United States)	Organiser of Les Fleurs du Mal; Mass Murderer; Proxy Killer	Captured	Jeremy Crutchley	"Les Fleurs du Mal"
152	Gina Zanetakos	(Germany)	Corporate terrorist; Assassin	Active	Margarita Levieva	"Gina Zanetakos"; "Alistair Pitt"; "Lady Ambrosia"; "The Caretaker"; "Mr. Solomon"
153	Dr. Roberta Sand (Born Eleanor Russo)	(United States)	Therapist; Private psychologist	Active	Enid Graham	"Dr. Roberta Sand, PhD."
154	William Myers; The Seer	(United States)	FBI Undercover Agent; Operator of Arcane Wireless	Active	Jeremy Davidson	"Arcane Wireless"
155	Cornelius Ruck	(United States)	Mercenary; Tracker	Deceased	Darren Goldstein	"Cornelius Ruck"
156	Pasha Kazanjian	(Russia)	Assassins	Active	David Kallaway	"Katarina Rostova"; "The Kazanjian Brothers"
157	Nshan Kazanjian	(Russia)	Assassins	Active	Bruce Louis	"Katarina Rostova"; "The Kazanjian Brothers"
158	Gordon Kemp	(United States)	Weapon manufacturer	Deceased	Jim True-Frost	"Gordon Kemp"
159	Stella Bisset	(United States)	Orion Relocation Services; Black market-moving company	Deceased	Deborah Rush	"Orion Relocation Services"
159	Benjamin Griffin; The Beekeeper	(United States)	Cult leader; Pharmacologist; Chemist	Deceased	—N/a	"The Beekeeper"
160	The Cryptobanker	(United States)	Black market financer; Money launderer	Captured	David Gautreaux	"The Cryptobanker"
161	Stanley R. Kornish; The Stewmaker	(United States)	Dentist; Body disposer	Deceased	Tom Noonan	"The Stewmaker"; "The Decembrist"
162	Bhavish Ratna; The Hawaladar	(India)	Money launderer	Active	Iqbal Theba	"The Hawaladar"
163	Benjamin Allen Charnquist; The Forecaster	(United States)	Contract Assassin	Deceased	David Furr	"The Forecaster"
164	Boukman Baptiste	(Algeria)	Interested in empire’s takeover; Lost his son during Dembe’s attack; Seeks revenge on Dembe	Deceased	Gbenga Akinnagbe	"Boukman Baptiste"
165	Anika DeBeer; The Whaler	(Australia)	Money launderer	Deceased	Lucy Taylor	"The Whaler"
166	Michael Hoagland	(United States)	CEO of Hoagland Services; Leader of the Dead Ring	Deceased	—N/a	"The Dead Ring"
167	The Morgana Logistics Corporation	(France)	Global contraband network	Captured	Various Actors	"The Morgana Logistics Corporation"
168	Razmik Maier	(Germany)	Doping and drug doctor; Works for Bergos Betting Syndicate	Deceased	Henry Stram	"Dr. Razmik Maier"
169	Harris Gramercy	(United States)	Head of Caelum Bank	Deceased	Jim Piddock	"Caelum Bank"
171	The Chairman	(United States)	Criminal stock market operator	Captured	Craig Bierko	"The Chairman"
172	Helen Maghi	(United States)	Geological architect; Storage facility owner; FBI suspect; Ammo smuggler	Active	Anna Khaja	"Helen Maghi"
173	Lawrence Nelson; The Postman	(United States)	Smuggler; First convict of Cooper	Captured	Robert Neary	"The Postman"
176	Gordon Graham	(United States)	Leader of an escort service; Professional hacker; In love with a robot	Deceased	Blake DeLong	"Genuine Models, Inc."
177	Don Francisco Luis Marquez; El Conejo (sp.The Rabbit)	(Mexico)	Leader of a cocaine cartel; Avocado supplier; Kidnapper	Captured	Carlos Gomez	"El Conejo"
178	The Supremo Priori Knighthood	(United States)	Cultists; Thieves	Captured	Various actors	"The SPK"
180	Laszlo Jancowics; Oroszlán (hun.The Lion)	(Hungary)	Drug dealer; Smuggler; Son to Marko Jancowics	Active	Alexander Pobutsky	"Laszlo Jancowics"
181	Eva Mason	(United States)	Abductor; Medical scientist; Targeting child abusers	Captured	Stephanie Kurtzuba	"Eva Mason"
182	Wormwood		Researcher; Hired killer	Captured	Dashiell Eaves	"Wormwood"
183	Benjamin Okara	(Nigeria)	Energetic weapon engineer	Deceased	Corey Allen	"Benjamin T. Okara"
184	Natalie Luca	(Moldova)	Former Patient at Hawthorne Biologics; Thief; Contract Assassin	Captured	Elizabeth Lail	"Natalie Luca"
185	Andrew Kennison	(United States)	MIT student; Founder and inventor of a medical monitor	Active	Joe Carroll	"The Chairman"; "Andrew Kennison"
192	Jemma Parikh; The Nowhere Bride	(India)	Dating network operator; Thief	Captured	Anjali Bhimani	"The Nowhere Bride"
192	John X		Assassin	Deceased	—N/a	"John X"
198	Michael Abani	(Yemen)	Civil doctor	Active	Cyrus Farmer	"Dr. Michael Abani"
199	Quentin Dodd	(United States)	Member of The Four Guns; Pickpocket	Active	Jacob Pitts	"The Four Guns"
200	Sean Bane; The Hyena	(United States)	Leverage scavenger	Deceased	Greg Yoder	"The Hyena"
X	Floriana Campo	(United States)	Faux humanitarian; Human trafficker; Leader of the Eberhardt cartel; Member of the Shell Island Retreat	Deceased	Isabella Rossellini	"The Freelancer"
X	Hector Lorca	(Mexico)	Drug Lord; Member of the Shell Island Retreat	Unknown	Clifton Collins Jr.	"The Stewmaker"
X	Laurence Dechambou	(France)	Ex-Agent of French Intelligence; Information Broker	Active	Barbara Schulz	"The Courier"
X	Maxwell Ruddiger	(Germany)	Bomb Maker; Explosives Expert	Active	Dikran Tulaine	"Gina Zanetakos"; "Anslo Garrick"; "Tom Keen"; "The Corsican"; "Robert Vesco"; "Robert Diaz"
X	Abraham Maltz	(United States)	Plastic Surgeon	Active	Andrew Dice Clay	"General Ludd"
X	Pytor Madrczyk	(United States)	Mob Informant	Deceased	David Vadim	"General Ludd"
X	General Yaabari	(Cameroon)	Warlord; General	Deceased	Sahr Ngaujah	"Lord Baltimore"; "T. Earl King VI"
X	Bernard Babbitt	(United States)	Murderer; Arms Trafficker; Drug Dealer; Syndicate Leader	Deceased	E.J. Carroll	"Dr. James Covington"
X	Die Entrechteten	(Germany)	Neo-nazi drug dealers located in Europe	Active	Various actors	"T. Earl King VI"; "The Major"; "Tom Keen"; "The Longevity Initiative"
X	Wendigo	(United States)	Assassin for hire	Deceased	Andy Dylan	"Arioch Cain"
X	Espen van der Merwe	(Netherlands)	Leader of the Shell Island Retreat	Active	Steven Crossley	"Mr. Gregory Devry"
X	Danny Vacarro	(United States)	Head of the Vacarro Family	Deceased	Vincent Curatola	"Alistair Pitt"
X	Mads Eriksson	(United States)	Head of the Eriksson Family	Deceased	Ronald Guttman	"Alistair Pitt"
X	Sebastian Royce; The Gambler	(United States)	Orchestrator of crimes	Unknown	—N/a	"The Gambler"
X	Rene le Bron	(France)	Black Market Financier	Deceased	Patrick Page	"The Thrushes"
X	The Coroner	(United States)	Identity change specialist	Captured	James Hong	"Dr. Adrian Shaw"
X	New Martyr's Brigade	(Libya)	Terrorist Organisation	Active	Various Actors	"Lipet's Seafood Company"
X	Helldritch	(United States)	Hacker; Thief of the witness protection list	Captured	J. Stephen Brantley	"The Harem"
X	Sophia Gallup	(United States)	Runner of the Sanctum Corporation	Captured	Paola Turbay	"Dembe Zuma"
X	Mario Dixon	(United States)	Thief	Deceased	Aldis Hodge	"Mr. Kaplan"
X	Mitchell Hatley; Henry Prescott	(United States)	Attorney; Cleaner; Fixer	Deceased	James Carpinello	"Mr. Kaplan: Conclusion"; "Smokey Putnum"; "Miss Rebecca Thrall"; "The Informant"
X	Roman LeMarc	(United States)	Leader of a Neo-Nazi organization	Captured	John Bedford Lloyd	"Smokey Putnum"
X	Willie Wilkins	(United States)	Drug dealer	Active	Kevin Mambo	"The Invisible Hand"
X	The Toymaker	(United States)	Creator of surveillance equipment	Active	Tony Torn	"The Invisible Hand"
X	Coogan Hudnutt	(United States)	Member of the Arian Nation	Active	David Millstone	"Anna-Gracia Duerte"
X	Oleg Gromov	(Russia)	Hacker	Deceased	Chris Petrov	"The Cryptobanker"
X	Ilya Koslov	(Russia)	Former Russian spy	Active	Brett Cullen	"Robert Diaz"; "Norman Devane"; "Hannah Hayes"; "The Hawaladar"; "Orion Relocation Services; "Katarina Rostova"; "Gordon Kemp"
X	Daniel Hutton; Simoon	(United States)	Former US soldier; Terrorist	Deceased	John Pyper-Ferguson	"Kuwait"
X	Viktor Skovic	(Russia)	Memory extraction specialist	Captured	Michael Cerveris	"The Hawaladar"; "Orion Relocation Services; "Katarina Rostova"
X	Zhao Wing	(China)	Syndicate leader	Captured	Clem Cheung	"The Hawaladar"
X	Eli Atticus	(United States)	Extraction specialist	Unknown	Tank Kelly	"The Hawaladar"
X	Tongji	(China)	Contractor	Active	Les Mau	"Katarina Rostova"
X	Cassandra Bianchi	(United Kingdom)	Thief; Former lover of Raymond Reddington	Active	Joely Richardson	"Cornelius Ruck"; "Genuine Models, Inc."
X	Mahmoud Iqbal	(Pakistan)	Thief	Deceased	Ajay Nandu	"Cornelius Ruck"
X	Joko Kozinski	(Kazakhstan)	Thief	Deceased	Hugo Armstrong	"Cornelius Ruck"
X	Annika Logan	(United States)	Thief	Deceased	Adeola Role	"Cornelius Ruck"
X	Margo	(United States)	Thief	Deceased	Katie Thompson	"Cornelius Ruck"
X	Costas Korba	(Greece)	Smuggler	Active	Peter Allas	"Nyle Hatcher"
X	Elias Vandyke	(United States)	Employee of Neville Townsend; Killer of Elizabeth Keen	Deceased	Lukas Hassel	"The Cyranoid"; "Dr. Laken Perillos"; "Anne"; "Misère"; "The Russian Knot"; "Nicholas Obenrader"; "Ivan Stepanov"; "Balthazar 'Bino' Baker"; "Godwin Page"; "Nachalo"; "Konets"
X	Jovan Lović	(Croatia)	Airport magnate	Deceased	Ego Mikitas	"Benjamin T. Okara"
X	Reginald Cole	(United States)	Retired NYPD officer; Private investigator; Recipient of a medical monitor	Deceased	Ross Partridge	"Andrew Kennison"
X	Tyson Lacroix	(United States)	Special political attorney; Blackmailer	Deceased	Teagle F. Bougere	"Andrew Kennison"
X	Heinrich Zimmerstahl	(Germany)	Safe designer; Security engineer	Active	Philip Goodwin	"El Conejo"
X	Maureen Rowan	(United States)	Retired officer; Bookshop worker; Sister to Kathryn Nemec	Deceased	Susan Pellegrino	"Laszlo Jancowics"
X	Clara Moore	(United States)	Private cleaner	Active	Winsome Brown	"Laszlo Jancowics"
X	Henrick Fisker	(Norway)	Leader of The Fisker Army	Captured	Pavel Szajda	"Marvin Gerard: Conclusion Pt. 1"
X	Sven Hollufson	(Norway)	Incumbent head of The Fisker Army	Active	Carsten Norgaard	"Marvin Gerard: Conclusion Pt. 1"; "The Freelancer: Pt. 2"; "The Troll Farmer: Pt. 3"
X	Zhang Wei	(China)	Wujing's right hand	Deceased	Kenneth Lee	"The Night Owl"; "The Whaler"; "The Hyena"; "The Dockery Affair"; "Dr. Laken Perillos: Conclusion"; "The Freelancer: Pt. 2"; "The Troll Farmer: Pt. 2"; "The Troll Farmer: Pt. 3"
X	Richard Deever	(United States)	Mercenary; Former MI-6 agent	Captured	Chris L. McKenna	"The Night Owl"; "The Freelancer: Pt. 2"
X	Lucas Roth	(United States)	Former U. S. Secret Service agent	Captured	Neal Huff	"The Four Guns"
X	Will Strickland	(United States)	U. S. Secret Service agent; Bodyguard	Captured	Guy Lockard	"The Four Guns"
X	Anton Johnston	(United States)	Serial killer	Captured	Charlie Semine	"The Dockery Affair"
X	Keith Perry	(United States)	Photographer; Spy	Captured	Kristopher Kling	"The Freelancer: Pt. 2"
X	Arthur Hudson	(United States)	Congressman	Deceased	Toby Leonard Moore	The Blacklist (recurring (season 10))

=== Pavlovich brothers ===
Portrayed by Goran Ivanovski, Renne Gjoni, James Biberi and Stivi Paskoski

The Pavlovich brothers (Blacklisters No. 119–122) were four Serbian relatives who specialized in snatch and grab operations. They first got a taste for blood working for Milošević's protective detail during the ethnic cleansing campaigns of the Yugoslav Wars but went on to operate independently with no political affiliation. Working together as a team, they use high firepower and ruthless tactics to achieve their goals.

In the series' pilot, they kidnapped Beth Ryker, the daughter of General Daniel Ryker, by killing six FBI Agents during the ambush.

They then kidnapped a Chinese scientist who had been rescued by the CIA. Later, Raymond Reddington hired them to kidnap Tom Keen. They delivered Tom to Elizabeth Keen. While attempting to smuggle Xiaoping Li back to China, they were killed at McKendrick Pier.

=== Stanley Kornish, "The Stewmaker" ===
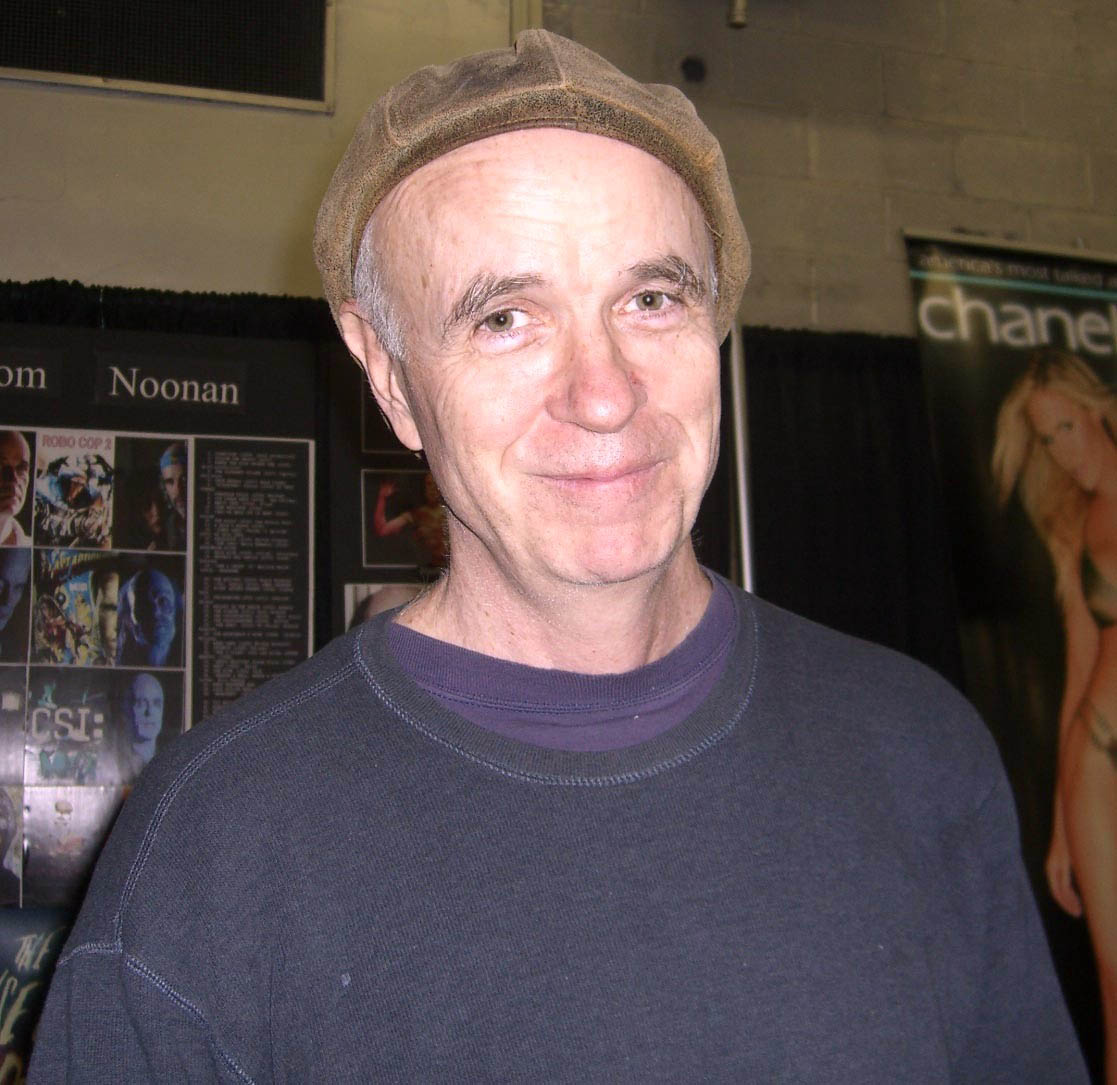
Tom Noonan portrayed Stanley Kornish in two episodes (seasons 1, 2)

Portrayed by Tom Noonan (season 1, episode 4; season 2, episode 8)

Stanley R. Kornish (Blacklister No. 161), a dentist by trade, had a separate career as a professional body disposal expert. Working for whoever could afford his services, he used his expert knowledge of chemicals to dissolve corpses until there was almost nothing left. He kept a photo of and a tooth from each victim as a souvenir. His dog accompanied him on his disposals.

In "The Decembrist", Raymond Reddington tells Milos Kirchoff how he interrogated Kornish about a photograph of Zoe D'Antonio found on the body of one of his associates. He explains that Zoe was brought to Kornish, for him to make her disappear.

=== Gina Zanetakos ===
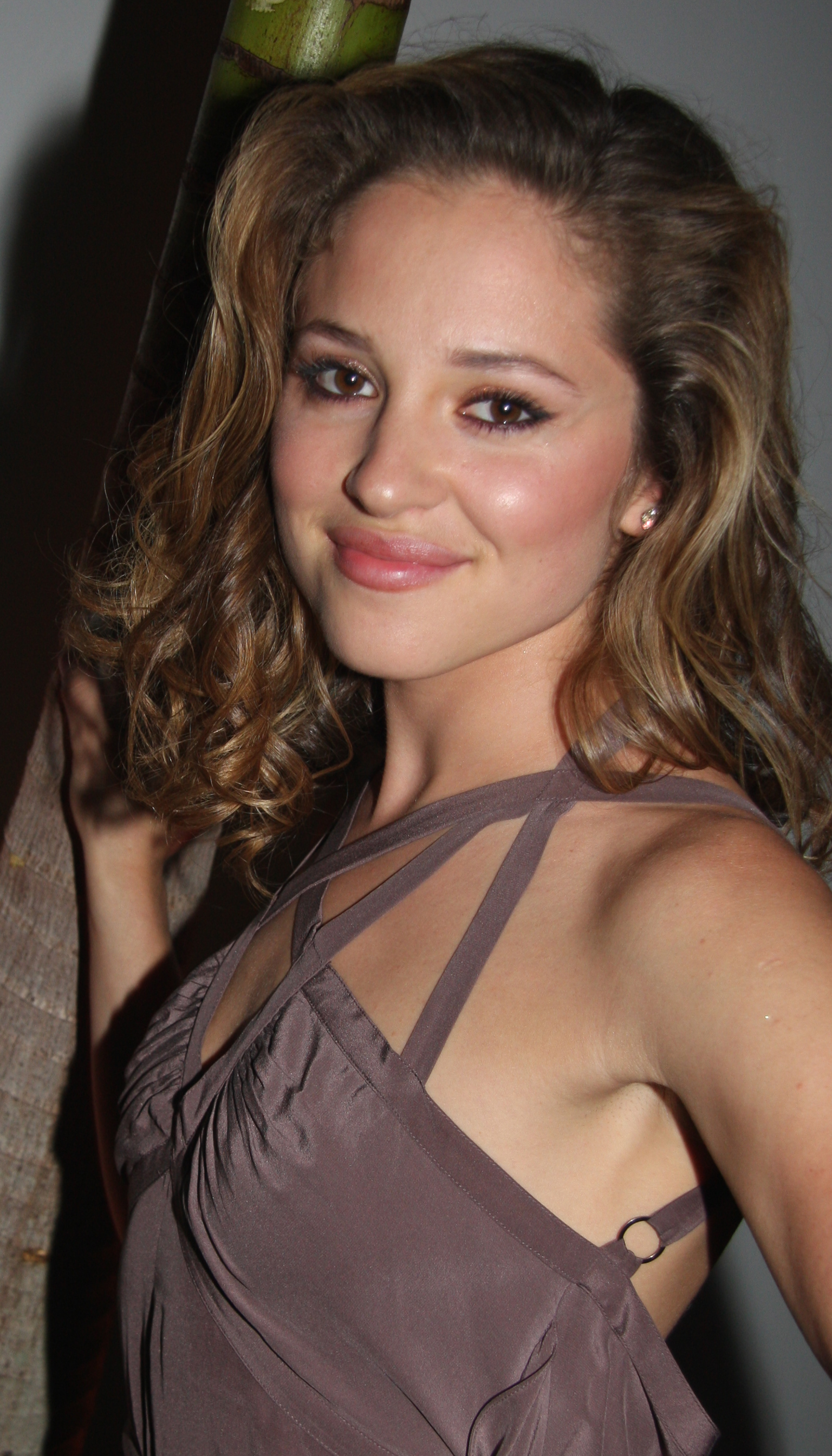
Margarita Levieva portrayed Gina Zanetakos in five episodes (seasons 1, 3)

Portrayed by Margarita Levieva

Gina Zanetakos (Blacklister No. 152) was a corporate terrorist who committed terrorist acts that resulted in corporations losing or gaining an advantage over the competition. Raymond Reddington said she once contacted him for help in assassinating a Supreme Court judge. He also claimed that she was a former lover of Tom Keen. She worked for the Major.

Using the alias Shubie Hartwell, she entered the United States. She was hired by the Hanar Group to detonate a dirty bomb in the Port of Houston. The explosion would have allowed the Hanar investors to profit from the re-routing of sea shipping to New Orleans. After being captured, she was allowed a plea bargain since the bomb had not devastated the port. A search of her apartment produced a photograph of Tom Keen who she claims not to know. When questioned about the murder of Victor Fokin, she claims to have committed the crime on the orders of Raymond Reddington.

Gina is eventually released from prison. Tom contacts her, looking for work to provide for Liz and his unborn baby. Gina reluctantly brings him to work on a jewelry heist. After they pull off the heist, she asks him to run away with her, and he refuses. She then double-crosses him and has him shot, but he survives. He then confronts her at gunpoint and demands that she persuade the Major to let him walk away from their organization, and she agrees. Later she is seen on the phone with an unknown person, talking about Tom.

Gina and the Major ambush Tom in Liz's apartment. The Major is about to kill Tom when Gina decides to kill the Major instead and leaves Tom to bury the body.

=== Anslo Garrick ===
Portrayed by Ritchie Coster

Anslo Garrick (Blacklister No. 16) was a mercenary who specialized in raiding secret and well-defended prison facilities and extracting high-level prisoners, always using extreme levels of violence. He worked almost exclusively with a unit of highly armed, countryless mercenaries known as "the Wild Bunch". At some point, he raided a CIA black site in the Bering Sea to exfiltrate a man named Mahmoud al-Azok. His employer paid him to plant evidence that blamed the raid on Peruvian insurgent organization Shining Path (Sendero Luminoso, Communist Party of Peru, Partido Comunista del Perú). At some point, he and Raymond Reddington worked together, though the alliance ended in 2008 when Garrick gave the FBI his train number and itinerary for a stop at Waterloo station in Brussels. Once Red arrived, a hit squad led by Donald Ressler attempted his life but failed. Red realized that Garrick had betrayed him and shot him in the face, damaging the right side of his face and apparently blinding his right eye. However, Garrick survived and spent 5 years in a prison described as a "black hole". To remind himself of the incident, Garrick never had the facial scarring repaired by surgery.

He was hired by Alan Fitch to kidnap Reddington. He succeeded in extracting Reddington from the FBI's custody and tortured him. Reddington ultimately killed him by stabbing him in the neck in "Anslo Garrick Conclusion".

=== Madeline Pratt ===
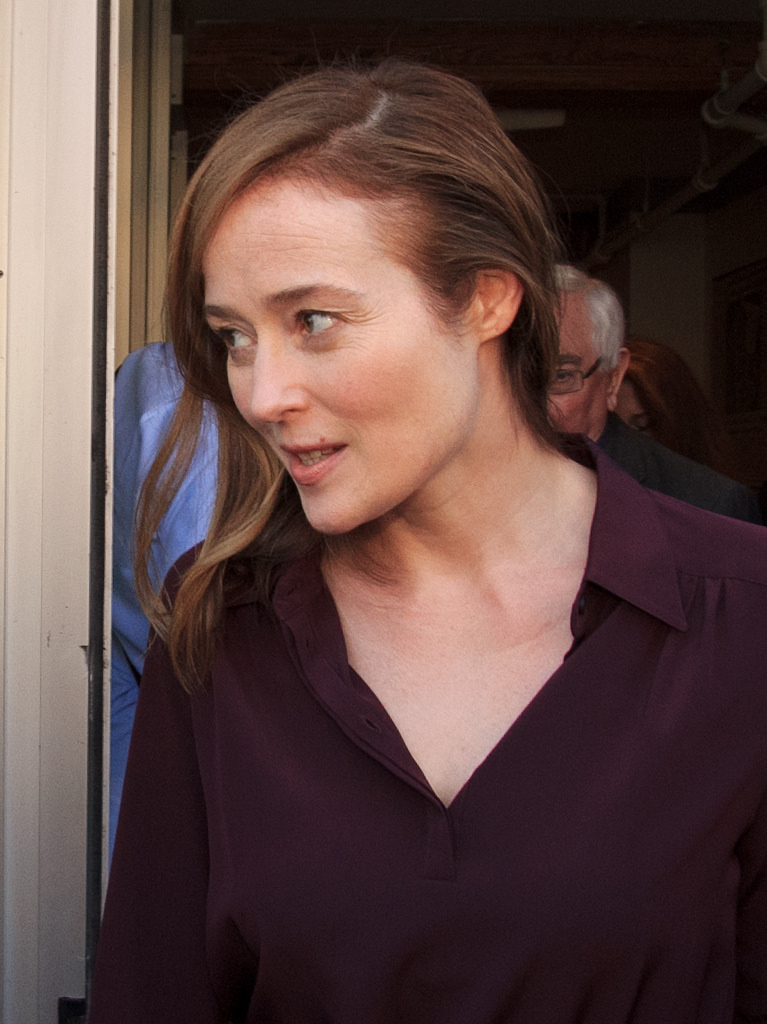
Jennifer Ehle portrayed Madeline Pratt in two episodes (seasons 1, 2)

Portrayed by Jennifer Ehle

Madeline Pratt (Blacklister No. 73), outwardly, is a well-known and politically active socialite. Behind the facade, she forms relationships and affiliations with powerful, influential people and then uses those connections to commit million dollar heists. Reddington credits her with the theft of 6 million dollars' worth of diamonds from a De Beers outpost in Congo and a heist on a mint in Prague in which the security fibers used to print the Czech koruna were stolen and then used to print counterfeit banknotes. She had a previous romantic connection with Reddington, which he broke off.

In the first season, she poses as Red's widow to steal documents belonging to him worth 10 million dollars from a bank in Istanbul to gain his attention regarding the proposed theft of the Effigy of Atargatis (leaving the first note). She met with Elizabeth Keen, whom Red had said was a career thief. After using Red and Liz as a diversion to allow her to steal the Effigy of Atargatis, she sold it to the Russian mafia after removing the Kungar 6 list. Red tricked her into revealing the location of the nuclear warheads and allowed her to escape. Later she stole a painting from Red as revenge (leaving the second note).

In the second-season episode "T. Earl King VI", Pratt was "kidnapped" by the Kings to bait Red into infiltrating "The Palace" so he could be sold at their auction.

=== Milos Kirchoff, "Berlin" ===
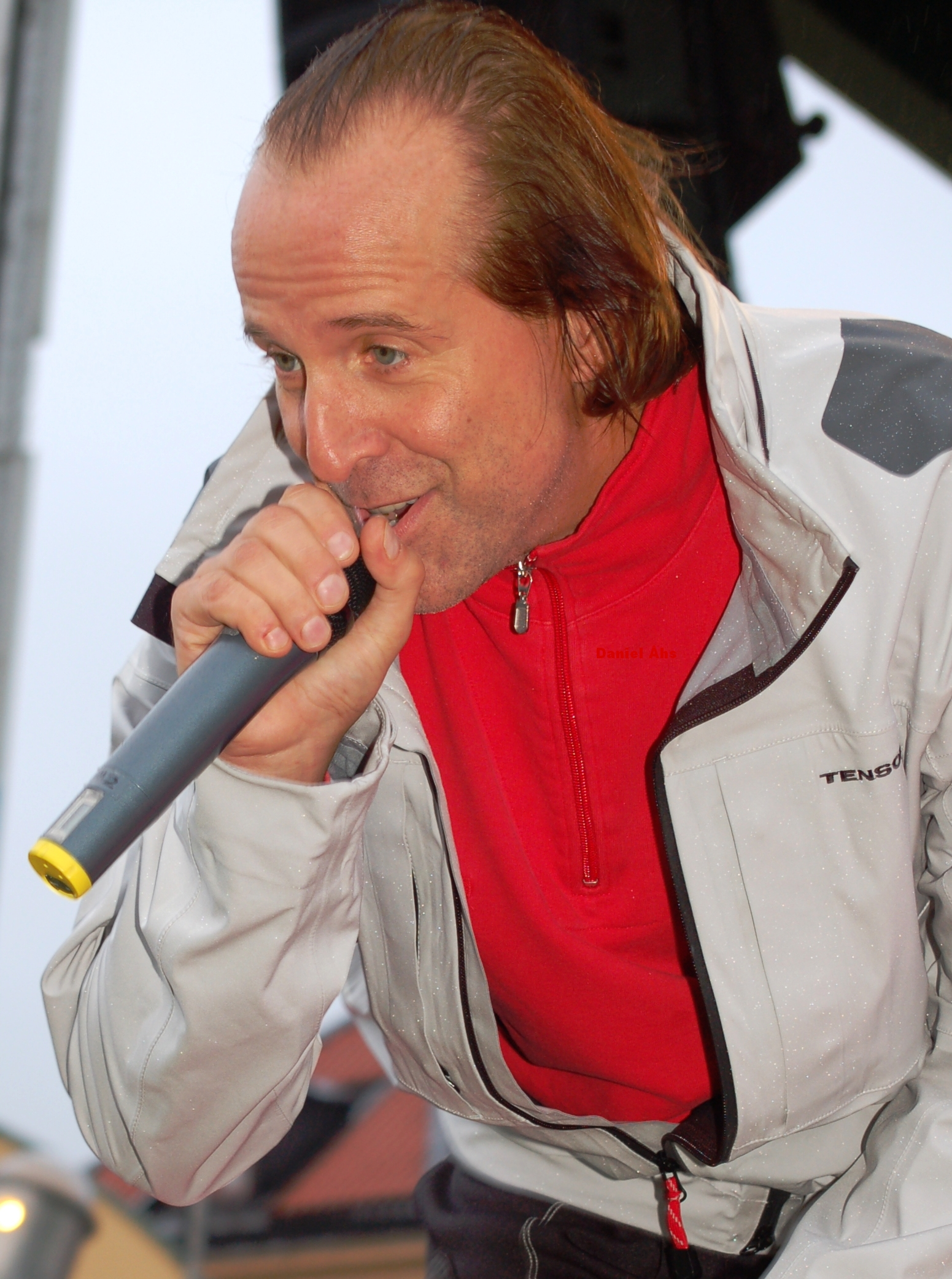
Milos Kirchoff is portrayed by Peter Stormare, in 2014

Portrayed by Peter Stormare

Milos Kirchoff (Blacklister No. 8) is one of Reddington's nemeses between the first and second seasons.

Before the series, Kirchoff started in the Red Army, rose to the rank of Colonel, and later became a member of the KGB. Notorious for sending his enemies to the gulags in Siberia, he was a loyal servant of the Soviet Union. In 1991, near the end of the Cold War, Kirchoff took part in a meeting in Kursk with other Soviet officials on how to combat their more progressive countrymen who wanted the Soviet Union dissolved. The meeting was interrupted when a bomb went off, killing 15 attendants and the last of the old Soviet resistance. The act was done by a man named Kiryl Morozov on the orders of Alan Fitch, known as "The Decembrist", but Reddington was blamed. Shortly after that, Kirchoff's daughter was suspected of falling in love with a dissident and imprisoned. He used his connections to help her escape, but the Kremlin found out and decided to use him as an example to the Motherland.

He was put in a Siberian gulag where a lot of people he had put away were imprisoned. One day, he was sent a pocket watch he had given his daughter. Over several months, he was sent several body parts and was led to believe that they were hers and that Reddington was behind it. In reality, Fitch sent body parts belonging to someone else and helped Kirchoff's daughter escape to the United States, but not before convincing her that her father was responsible for the bombing. Eventually, Kirchoff sharpened one of the bones he had been sent into a weapon, killed the people holding him captive, and escaped and formed his criminal syndicate under the alias "Berlin".

During the first eight episodes of the second season, Red meets with Milos Kirchoff again, who once more blames him for his daughter's death and intends to hurt Red by going after Zoe D'Antonio, whom he assumes is Red's daughter. Red reveals that Zoe is Kirchoff's daughter, that someone else in Kirchoff's faction had lied to him about her being killed, and reunites Kirchoff and his daughter.

In the episode "The Decembrist", after being reunited with Zoe, Milos learned the truth of Red's innocence. He kills Kiryl Morozov after learning of Fitch's orders to frame Red and use Milos as a pawn. He was furious with Alan Fitch for lying to him about her death and takes action. Milos orders his agents to abduct Fitch and strap a pipe bomb on him, intending to kill him. Using Zoe to gain the access numbers to free Fitch, Red holds Milos at gunpoint. Red returns to the warehouse where he is holding Milos prisoner with a bottle of vodka and places 2 shot glasses in front of Milos. After they reminisce about the Cold War and finish the bottle, Red kills Milos.

=== Luther Braxton ===
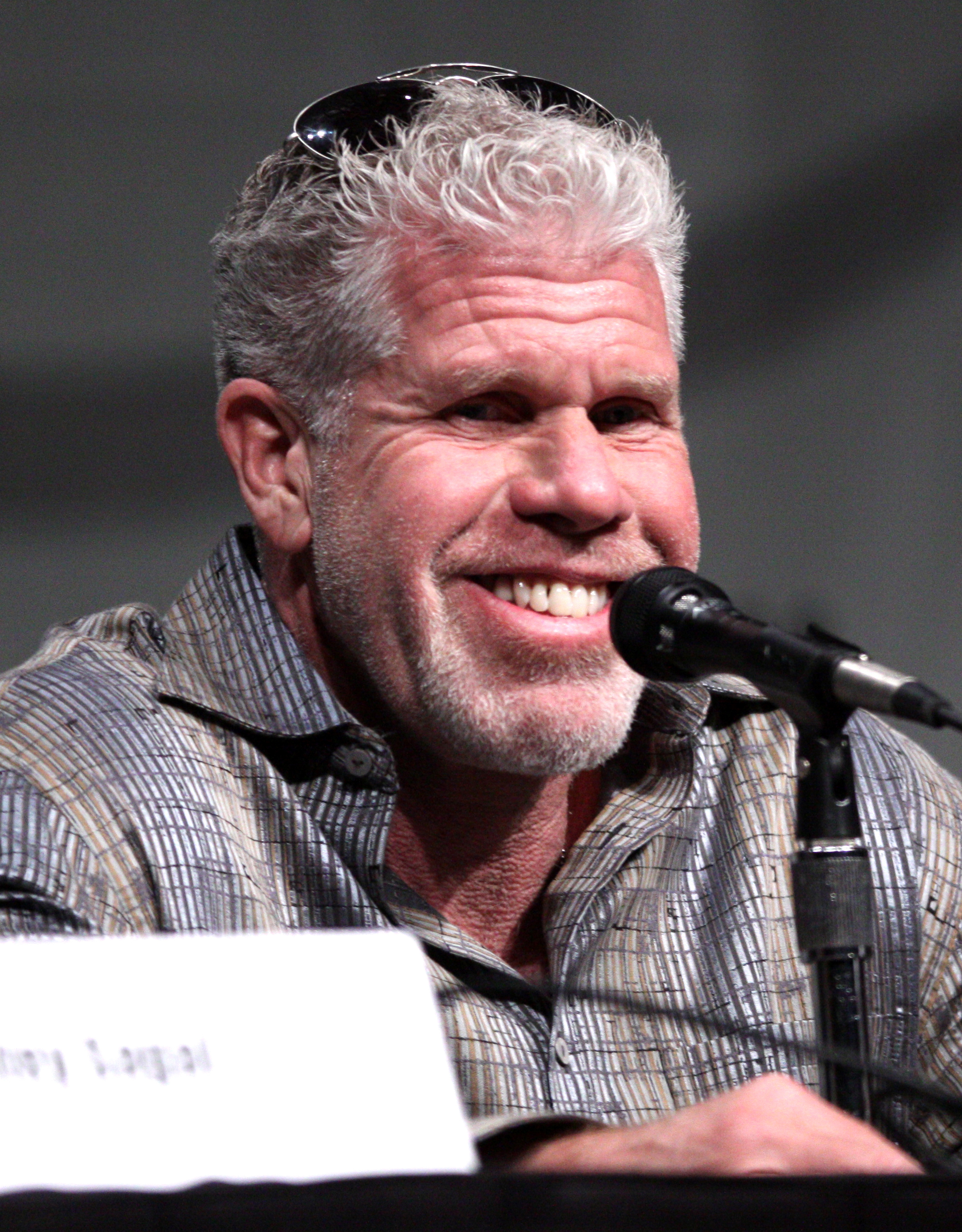
Luther Braxton is portrayed by Ron Perlman, in 2015

Portrayed by Ron Perlman

Luther Todd Braxton (Blacklister No. 21) is a professional thief known for stealing money and information from China, Iran, and the United States. He typically organizes his operations to take place during wars, natural disasters, or other upheavals and takes advantage of the surrounding chaos to cover them up. He is credited with stealing 282 million dollars from Baghdad during Operation Shock and Awe and the abduction of a CIA asset from Tehran during the 2009–10 Iranian election protests. Braxton has a past with Reddington, including an incident in Belgrade where Braxton bested him, killing Red's local point man, Henkel, and hanging him by the neck with one of Reddington's own neckties. While serving in the Gulf War, Braxton was involved in a traumatic friendly fire incident in Khafji. He was successfully given therapy to have the memories of it removed.

He was hired by the Director to get the Fulcrum, and captured and interrogated Liz to find it, subjecting her to therapy to help recover blocked memories from her past that related to the Fulcrum. He was killed by Reddington in episode 10 of season 2.

=== "The Major" ===
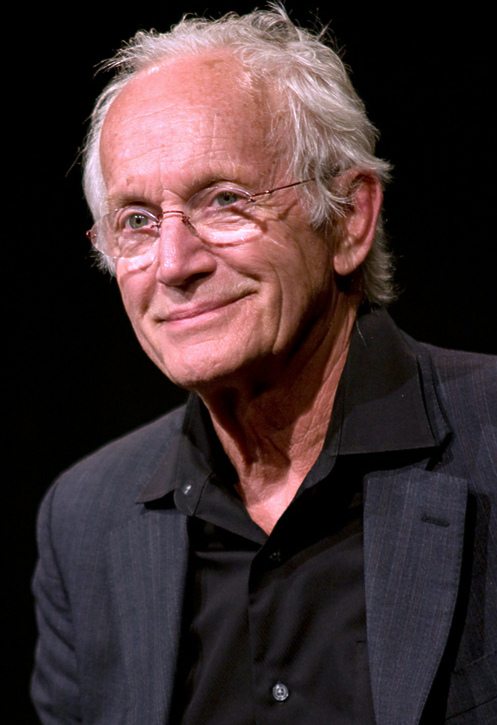
The Major is portrayed by Lance Henriksen

Portrayed by Lance Henriksen

" The Major" (Blacklister No. 75) recruits social exiles who have a specific psychopathy personality profile. The persons are trained to act as spies for various clients. Once an agent has been assigned, they are to only contact the Major if the situation is "mission-critical". One of his star operatives was Jacob Phelps, who posed as "Tom Keen", Elizabeth Keen's husband, for several years. The terrorist Gina Zanetakos also works for him.

The Major tried to kill Tom but was killed by Gina instead.

=== Die Entrechteten ===
Die Entrechteten (German: "The Disenfranchised") are a neo-nazi movement that smuggle drugs and weapons around Europe. Tom had a contract to infiltrate inside until Reddington lied to them about Tom being an informant working for the FBI to bring him back to the USA and confess the murder of harbormaster Eugene Ames to free Liz from being imprisoned.

in the episode "The Longevity Initiative", the Germans track down both Tom and the Major and torture them for their leader's death. After they threatened him to kill Elizabeth if he didn't talk about his motives for his infiltration, Tom and makes a deal: in exchange for Liz would not be their target, he reveals his assignment: he's going to help them solve the murder of a woman named Sarah Hastings, who was affiliated to the Germans, which is the main reason they want revenge for her death. After accepting the truce, they let Tom and the Major go.

These are some of the members of the movement:

- Elias (Chandler Williams)
- Elias's right-hand man (David Patrick Kelly)
- "Skinhead" (Addison LeMay)
- Ali (Hadi Tabbal)
- Franz (Vadim Kroll)

=== Marvin Gerard ===
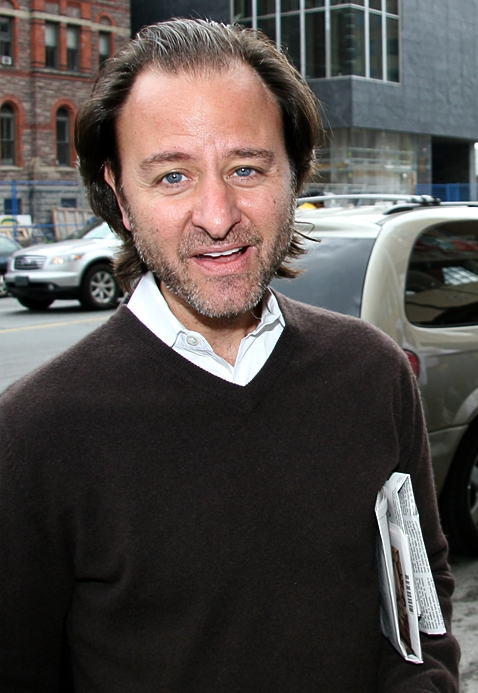
Marvin Gerard is portrayed by Fisher Stevens, in 2015

Portrayed by Fisher Stevens

Marvin Gerard (Blacklister No. 80) was a Harvard alum and magna cum laude graduate, Gerard became the college's third-youngest professor at the age of 31. He went on to serve as prosecutor for the state of New York for 3 years, after which he made a partner at his father-in-law's criminal defense firm. While Gerard was being considered for a seat on the federal bench, his teenage son, Timothy, fell in with a bad crowd and, suffering emotional abuse from his mother, abused prescription drugs he got from her supply. Gerard separated from his wife and filed for custody, but since his wife came from an influential family, he wasn't able to. He eventually went so far as to kidnap Timothy to keep him away from his mother, for which he was disbarred and sentenced to 7–10 years at Federal Correctional Institution, Cumberland. Timothy hanged himself a year later. Gerard continued doing legal work behind bars, serving as shadow counsel to politicians, CEOs, and high-profile criminals, including Reddington, who apparently consulted with Gerard before he turned himself into the FBI against Gerard's strong objections.

In "Sir Crispin Crandall", Gerard locates the vault where Peter Kotsiopulos is keeping his embezzled money.

In "The Director, Conclusion", when Red puts together a team to exonerate Liz, he calls in Gerard as part of that team. Gerard helps them plan on how to kidnap Peter Kotsiopulos. Once they have the Director, Red demands Laurel Hitchin exonerate Liz in exchange for Red not taking the Director to the Hague and sends in Gerard to discuss the terms of the deal with Laurel. Eventually, Gerard manages to negotiate a deal where Liz is exonerated publicly for all but the Tom Connolly murder as Liz killed him in front of witnesses and it wasn't in self-defense. Instead, Laurel offers a plea of involuntary manslaughter with 3 years' probation. Gerard privately talks to Red and convinces him to take the deal as it will keep Liz safe and out of prison and is better than Gerard expected them to get. Gerard later presents the deal to Liz who reluctantly signs it as she will no longer able to be an FBI agent though she can remain on the task force in a similar capacity to Red. Thanks to Gerard's deal, Liz is later able to walk free. In "The Apothecary", Red believes Gerard poisoned him and is destroying his organization until it's revealed to be Dembe. In "Philomena", Gerard is kidnapped by a bounty hunter, Philomena, who works for Mr. Kaplan. When he refuses to turn against Reddington, Kaplan leaves him bound to a lamppost, and he is arrested by the police. He coerces Ressler into arranging his release by threatening to reveal the latter's collaboration with Reddington to Julian Gale.

In "Caelum Bank," he is revealed to be the one responsible for the murder of Elizabeth Keen.

In "Marvin Gerard: Conclusion," he is hunted by both the Taskforce and Red, putting them at odds with each other. Gerard is eventually arrested by Ressler, but he offers a deal to create a new Taskforce with Gerard replacing Red which the Justice Department decides to accept. Gerard privately tells Ressler that it doesn't feel like a win to him but rather a loss for both Marvin and Red as he would've faithfully served Red for the rest of his life if he could've. Gerard believes that Red will eventually succeed in killing him one day no matter what precautions are taken to protect him. In the judge's chambers, Red confronts Gerard, expressing understanding about his actions which Gerard believes were necessary to protect their syndicate from falling apart. However, Red calls Gerard a coward who can't ever hope to replace him, pointing out that Gerard's actions had left him hidden rather committing Liz's murder himself. Accepting his fate and admitting that he'd never even wanted to win against his friend, Gerard order Red to kill him, but when the judge returns, Gerard is still alive and Red is gone. Gerard completes his deal and he is later released with the charges against Cooper being dropped as a result, but he first reveals the truth about Red's deal to Wujing and a list of people that he's sent to prison all over the world. Red later reveals to Cooper that he had allowed Gerard's deal to go through on the condition that Gerard take his own life after being given the chance to say goodbye and put his affairs into order. If he had refused, Red would've seen if he could've gone through with killing his friend. Gerard had accepted the deal, but told Red that to him the most important thing in the world was their work on the Blacklist, but it wasn't to Red. Gerard later commits suicide while sitting in his car. Panabaker later reveals this to Red and Cooper along with the fact that the Attorney General has agreed to keep his promise to drop the charges against Cooper and to continue the Taskforce with Reddington. Gerard dies one day before the three year anniversary of Liz's death.

=== Zal Bin Hasaan ===
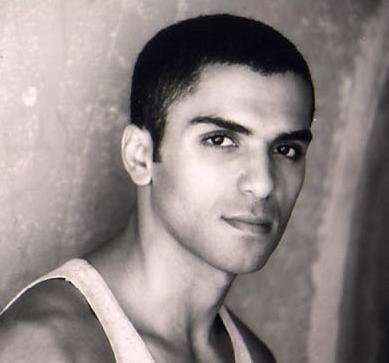
Zal Bin Hasaan is portrayed by Sammy Sheik, in 2015

Portrayed by Sammy Sheik

Zal Bin Hasaan (Blacklister No. 31), born Shahin Navabi, is the younger brother of Mossad agent Samar Navabi. He witnessed his parents' murder at a very young age. He faked his own death after carrying out his very first bomb attack, adopted the pseudonym "Zal Bin Hasaan", and began a career as a feared and vicious terrorist in the service of the Iranian regime. He evaded capture for many years, despite the best efforts of an elite Mossad task force dedicated to hunting him down. He resurfaced in America, where he abducted six technicians working on Israel's Iron Dome defense system. Posing as a hostage, he was reunited with his sister, claiming he had gone into hiding to avoid persecution. He and his men infiltrated a Mossad compound, seeking a list that contained the names of the members of the task force. However, Samar and her ex-partner destroyed it when she found out his actions as a terrorist. After Shahin was captured by Red, Samar disowns him, believing that the heart and soul of Samar died with their parents. She leaves him in Red's custody, and Red turned him over to unnamed associates in exchange for a favor.

=== Artax Network ===
The Artax Network (Blacklister No. 41) is a defunct network of communications satellites that was intended to provide data coverage throughout the globe. Matias Solomon and his employers used it to track all of Liz Keen's movements and actions. Aram discovered this and the FBI forced Solomon's group to abandon the network.

=== Katarina Rostova ===
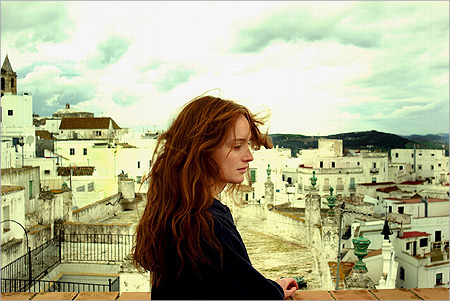
Katarina Rostova is portrayed by Lotte Verbeek

Portrayed by Lotte Verbeek

Katarina Rostova (Blacklister No. 3) was a Russian spy who was assigned to turn Raymond Reddington but instead formed a romantic relationship with him that resulted in the birth of Masha Rostova/Elizabeth Keen. Her father was named Dom.

In "Cape May", it is revealed that Reddington believed that she had committed suicide by drowning to protect Liz from unknown individuals who were pursuing her. He continued to tell Liz that her mother was dead, despite receiving a painting commissioned by someone who claimed to be Rostova. However, Liz and Tom suspected she was alive. Katarina had left a journal in the house that Kirk claimed Liz grew up in and while reading it, she learns more about Katarina's affair with Red along with the Rostov family's long history with rare cancer.

In the season 4 episode "Requiem", it is revealed that Katarina hired Mr. Kaplan to be Liz's nanny. During this time, Katarina was forced to kill a Soviet agent in self-defense; Kaplan disposed of the body. Later, Katarina tells Kaplan that Reddington kidnapped Liz, believing her to be his daughter. She was unaware that he took Liz to America to live with his family out of a need to protect both her and Katarina from not only Kirk/Rostov (who found out about the affair) but also Berlin/Kirchoff who was attacking him. Katarina rescued Liz but was forced to flee when both the US and Russian governments began hunting her. She asked Kaplan to leave Liz in the care of the man who would become her foster father, Sam.

In "Mr. Kaplan Conclusion", before her suicide, Kaplan prayed for Katarina to forgive her as she dug up the suitcase and left it in a storage locker. The suitcase was later retrieved by Tom Keen and opened to discover skeletal remains that apparently belong to the real Raymond Reddington.

In "Rassvet", it is revealed that Katarina was a double agent working both for the Cabal and the KGB. The real Reddington was the man shot by Liz on the night of the fire from which he was pulled by Katarina and her lover Ilya Koslov in an attempt to save Reddington's life. However, Reddington died of his injuries and the two covered up his death, leading to Reddington being declared missing. Katarina's apparent suicide was to fake her death, but her survival was exposed to Anton Velov when Katarina intervened to stop a rape at a shelter she was living at. After a brief period in hiding, she and Ilya traveled to Moscow to warn her father, who was also her KGB handler, to leave Russia to escape the Soviet government's reprisals for her treason. Later she tried to kill herself but was stopped by Ilya. She then agreed to his proposal to assume Raymond Reddington's identity and gain access to his accounts, to protect her and her daughter Masha from the Cabal, and to stop Reddington from being discredited as she knew he would be. In the present, Liz locates Katarina's father who reveals that twenty-eight years before, Katarina visited him and promised to send Dom a letter to a post office box once it was safe for her again. Though Dom checks every week, Katarina has not sent one letter despite it having been nearly thirty years. Dom is unsure if she is still alive, convinced that Katarina would've made contact if she was still around.

In "Robert Diaz", Katarina is revealed to be alive and living in Paris. When Red/Ilya appeared to warn her about the former KGB's newest assassination attempt on her life, Katarina briefly kisses him before stabbing him in the stomach. A group of men takes Red away in a car and she leaves, carrying only his hat.

Katarina brutally interrogates Reddington for information on an unnamed group that is pursuing her. After Reddington escapes to Dom's house, Katarina makes an unsuccessful attempt to recapture him. She then moves into an apartment across the hall from Liz, posing as Madeleine Tolliver, a friendly retiree with an estranged daughter. She begins insinuating herself into Liz's life, installing surveillance devices in Liz's apartment and babysitting Agnes. While taking Agnes to the park, she inadvertently allows Agnes to see the dead body of an assailant she killed.

Using knowledge gleaned from her surveillance, she finds and kidnaps "Frank Bloom", addressing him as Ilya Koslov and torturing him for information on an attempt on her life he helped engineer years ago in Belgrade. After Liz discovers "Madeleine" is an imposter and confronts her at gunpoint, Katarina admits she is Liz's mother. Katarina abducts Liz and tells her that Frank Bloom, not Reddington, is the real Ilya Koslov and that both Reddington and Dom are lying. Liz helps her escape when the FBI closes in on her location. Reddington is tailing Katarina when a car runs into her vehicle and two assassins shoot her and drag away the body. It is later revealed that Katarina faked her own death to convince Reddington to stop hunting her. She contacts Liz, promising to return when she has found out who is pursuing her.

Katarina returned to abduct her father Dom for the information that he, Ilya, and Red refused to give. Elizabeth chooses her mother over Raymond and betrays her FBI colleagues and kidnaps her grandfather Dom. Katarina explained that Dom and Ilya tried to kill her to get a group called the Townsend Directive to believe she died, as Dom told Townsend that Katarina was supposedly a secret agent codenamed N-13 who had blackmail information on multiple countries called the Sikorsky Archive. These countries put together the Townsend Directive as a bounty on their target whom they think is N-13, Katarina. A dying Dom tells Katarina she did indeed take the Archive much to her confusion and that she and Reddington have it. She leaves before Reddington gets there but he comforts a dying Dom, telling him Katarina loved Dom. Katarina calls to meet a member of Townsend only to have been beaten by Raymond to the meet. He reveals Dom died and wasn't surprised by her lack of love for him. He informs her that he had no idea that Dom and Ilya would try to kill her but she was angry that he let the world believe the lie so the Townsend Directive wouldn't chase him, as she believes he's N-13. He claims he could have kept her safe as he always had but she needed answers and now they've destroyed her. Katarina left her phone on Elizabeth's voicemail with Katarina claiming that Raymond is N-13, which he neither confirms nor denies, simply stating things are much more complicated. As she tries to walk off, not thinking he'll kill her or lose Elizabeth, Reddington shoots and kills Katarina in front of the just arriving Elizabeth. This sparks Elizabeth's revenge crusade upon Reddington.

In "Nachalo", Elizabeth is taken to the heart of Reddington's empire – an old Cold War-era Soviet bunker in Latvia – where she finally learns the truth about Reddington. Katarina appears in several flashbacks as well as an image narrating the story to her daughter. Elizabeth learns that after the death of the real Raymond Reddington it was in fact Katarina who had her memory of that night erased in order to protect her daughter and then sent Elizabeth to live with Sam Scott for her own protection. Elizabeth also learns that much of what she was told about Katarina and Ilya Koslov was actually true, but Dom had lied about who eventually became Raymond Reddington. The Katarina that was targeted for assassination by Dom and Ilya was not in fact the real Katarina but instead an asset named Tatiana Petrova who was set up by Ilya and Dom to fool the Townsend Directive into thinking that Katarina was actually dead. However, the assassination plan backfired, leading to the death of Tatiana's husband instead. It was in fact Tatiana in the guise of Katarina whom Elizabeth had met, Tatiana seeking the real Katarina in order to get Neville Townsend to stop hunting her and get her life back. Tatiana used Elizabeth's love for her mother to manipulate Elizabeth into helping her and was killed by Reddington in order to protect the real Katarina, who is alive and well, after Dom revealed to Tatiana where to find her. The image of Katarina explains to Elizabeth that it was in fact Katarina herself who had constructed the fake Raymond Reddington using the legend that had grown around the real one due to Katarina framing him as a traitor so that Katarina could create someone who could protect her daughter from all of Katarina's enemies when Katarina could not. Before Elizabeth can learn who Reddington really is or where to find the real Katarina, the bunker is attacked by Townsend.

=== Alexander Kirk ===
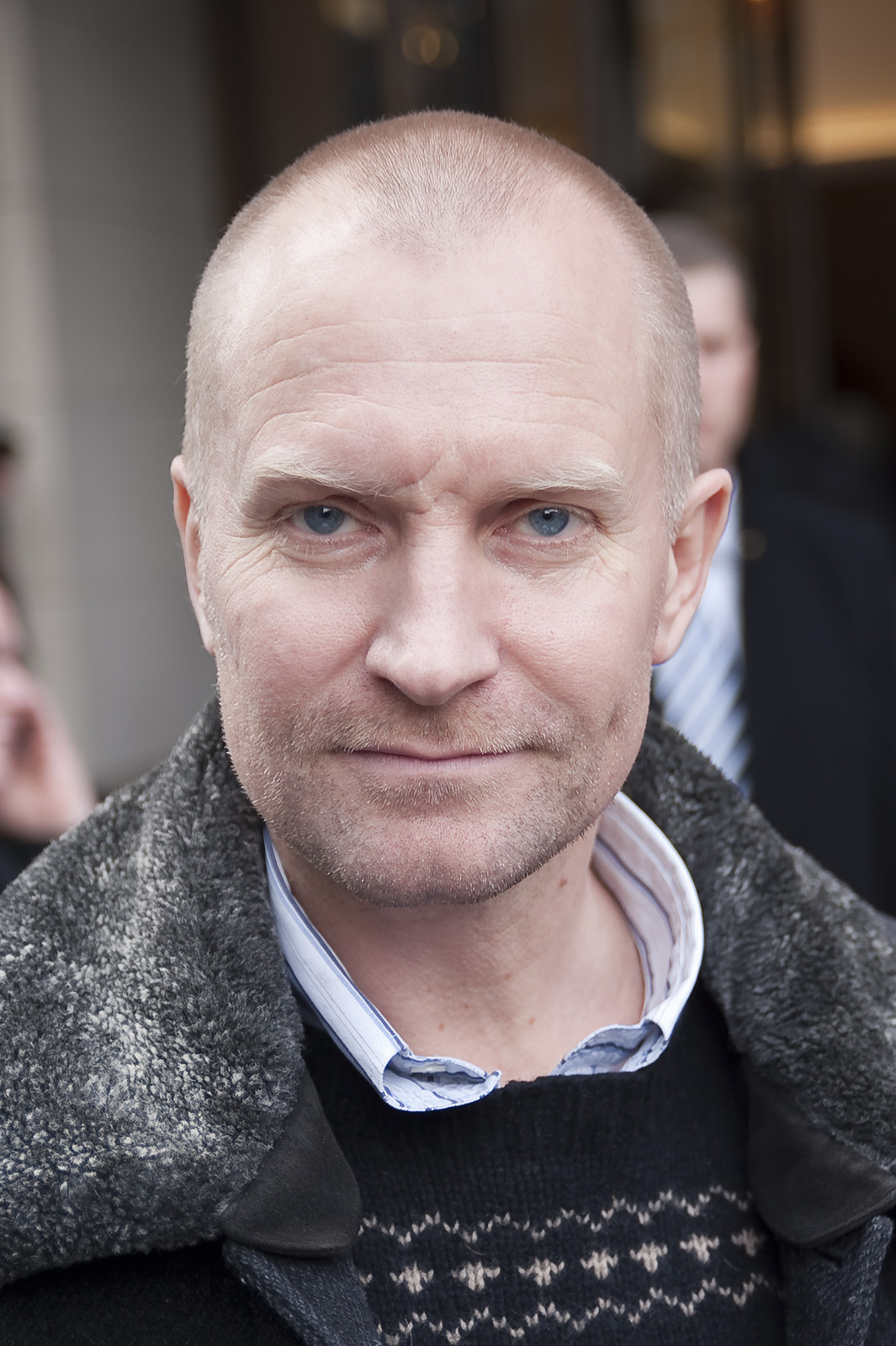
Alexander Kirk is portrayed by Ulrich Thomsen

Portrayed by Ulrich Thomsen

Alexander Kirk (Blacklister No. 14), born Constantin Rostov, is a powerful billionaire businessman who made his fortune buying up Russian companies after the fall of the Soviet Union. He claims to be Elizabeth Keen's father and is suffering from an unrevealed medical condition (possibly a low blood cell count).

Kirk was revealed to be the mysterious client who had hired Susan Hargrave to capture Liz. After Liz faked her death, he hires an assassin to kill Tom Keen and take Agnes. Reddington and Hargrave steal $300 million from Senator Diaz, a presidential candidate Kirk was backing, in an attempt to lure Kirk to the United States, but Kirk does not take the bait. After Reddington frames him for selling oil to rebels, Kirk is forced to appear before a congressional committee to testify. He changes his mind at the last minute when his men ping Tom's phone at the hospital where Agnes is being cared for, and discover Liz is alive. He flies to the Keens' new hideaway in Cuba, has Liz kidnapped and brought to him, and tells her that he is her father.

Liz is in disbelief at Kirk's claims and doesn't trust him. So Kirk takes her to the house he claimed she grew up in, near Nova Scotia. When the FBI rescued her, Kirk decides to continue his revenge on Red by keeping Agnes from him. Red reveals why Kirk had kidnapped both Liz and Agnes in the first place: he is dying of a rare genetic blood disease that female relatives do not share. Kirk intends to use Liz for a bone marrow transplant to save his own life. In "Dr. Adrian Shaw", Liz attempts to save Kirk through the transplant; but the DNA test performed by the hospital reveals that Kirk is not her father. Angered by the fact that he lied to her and sent her falsified DNA transcripts, Liz abandons Kirk. In "Dr. Adrian Shaw: Conclusion", Kirk escapes the hospital with Liz and is upset to learn he really isn't her father. Kirk trades Liz for Red though the person he sends to release Liz safely tries to kill her, saying that Kirk used to be a good man until he saw her on TV on the run from the Cabal and became obsessed with her. Liz is rescued by Ressler and Samar and with Aram's help, tracks down Kirk's location. Kirk tortures Red who confesses to being Liz's father and brings Kirk a cure. Kirk decides to kill Red rather than release him in exchange for the cure and the two men reminisce over Katarina Rostova. As Kirk goes to kill Red, Red whispers something in his ear that causes Kirk to stop. Both men disappear from Kirk's lab afterward and later that night, Red tells Liz that Kirk is "gone". When Liz asks if Kirk is dead, all Red will say is that Kirk is gone with no further explanation. In "Lipet's Seafood Company", it's confirmed that Red allowed Kirk to escape. Cooper berates Red for this, but Red simply tells him that Kirk is gone and won't be coming back and insists they move on.

In "Nachalo", Kirk appears in flashbacks as Liz learns the story behind the creation of the fake Raymond Reddington.

=== Mr. Kaplan ===
Portrayed by Susan Blommaert and Joanna P. Adler (young Kaplan)

Kate "Mr." Kaplan (Blacklister No. 4), born Kathryn "Kathya" Nemec, is Reddington's personal "cleaner" who comes in to scrub crime scenes. She cleans up after Liz kills one of the men watching her from across the street, and then helps Liz find Reddington. ^{Ep. 1–10} Later, she helps Reddington clean up after he kills Diane Fowler at the end of episode 13 of season 1. She also disposes of the bodies of Lucy Brooks and the Cowboy once they are found by Reddington's people. In season 3, she helps Liz fake her death so she can escape from Reddington. For this, she is shot in the head by Reddington in the second episode of season 4, but survives and is held hostage by an unknown man in "Gaia". She later recovers and leaves.

In the season 4 episode "Requiem", it is revealed that she was hired by Katarina Rostova to be young Liz's nanny. She became friends with Katarina after discovering she was a Soviet spy and learned that she was having an affair with Reddington. When Katarina was forced to flee and abandon her daughter, Kaplan left Liz with her foster father, Sam. Later, she fell in love with a woman named Annie Kaplan and assumed her surname after Annie was murdered in front of her. She then joined Reddington's employ to protect Liz, on the understanding that she would always place Liz's interests ahead of his. In the present day, she exhumes all the bodies she buried for Reddington over the years, intending to use them to destroy him. In "Philomena", Kaplan hires Philomena, a bounty hunter, to kidnap two of Reddington's subordinates, including Marvin Gerard. She tells Liz that she was her nanny, and warns Liz not to get involved in the fight between her and Reddington.

In "The Debt Collector", Kaplan calls a temporary truce with the FBI to find Liz after the latter is kidnapped. She tracks down Liz, only to learn that Reddington engineered the kidnapping to draw her out. When she confronts him, she declares that the two of them can't coexist.

In "Mr. Kaplan"/"Mr. Kaplan: Conclusion", Kaplan attacks the task force, first attempting to steal a copy of Reddington's immunity agreement with the DOJ and give it to Julian Gale. When Reddington foils this plan, Kaplan agrees to testify about Reddington's crimes to a grand jury. Before doing so, she exhumes a suitcase containing the skeleton of an unknown individual. After the grand jury is dissolved through Reddington's machinations, Kaplan is cornered by the FBI and Reddington. The latter refuses to kill her and admits his remorse for trying in the first place, but she tells him that she has arranged for an accomplice to give Liz "the truth" after her death, then she commits suicide. Afterward, her accomplice revealed to be Tom Keen, picks up the suitcase, presumably to deliver it to Liz.

In "Misère", Kaplan visits Elizabeth as a part of her hallucinations to show her, who she became much alike. Under Kaplan’s guidelines, Liz provokes Reddington by abducting his love interest, Anne. When Red arrives, he notes that he clearly sees Kaplan behind Liz; however, before Liz could use the opportunity to stop Red, Anne attempts to escape, but instead she is bumped into the table and killed. Liz escapes from grieving Red, and never sees Kaplan since then.

In "El Conejo", after six years of her death, Reddington visits the keeper of his one-of-a-kind security safe with his lessons recorded to Liz in Montenegro and investigates them being found in a storage of a murdered policeman, who had connection neither with Red, nor Liz. He discovers the safe to be a duplicate and calls the master, who made the safe. The master, however, tells Red about the duplicate being ordered by Mr. Kaplan, leaving the question of her being still alive all that time. In "Laszlo Jancowics", Red contacts her sister, Maureen, and finds a link to Kaplan. This link was her private cleaner, with whom she arranged a meeting at the disused factory. But when Red sends his squad to capture Kaplan, the factory blows up with Kaplan, Chuck and Morgan in it.

In "The Bear Mask", Vladimir Cvetko examines the DNA of what has left from Kaplan after the explosion and reveals that her data is only half-accurate, meaning that the woman attacked was not Kaplan, but Maureen. In "Caelum Bank", Marvin Gerard claims that the whole trick about Kaplan was one of his plans to make Reddington step back from investigating the murder of Elizabeth.

=== Henry Prescott ===
Portrayed By James Carpinello

Henry Prescott was a cleaner hired to dispose of bodies accidentally or intentionally killed by the victims. His services were used by Red to help the Task Force get them Reven Wright's body as evidence to strengthen Donald Ressler's case against Hitchin and forced her to help whitewash the Grand Jury to throw off Kaplan and Julian Gale. Prescott's services were later used by Ressler under the pseudonym of Frank Sturgeon to dispose of Hitchin's body after he accidentally kills her.

In "Smokey Putnum" upon discovering Ressler's true identity, Prescott blackmails him for favors if he wants his secret to remain under wraps. In "Miss Rebecca Thrall", he calls Ressler for a favor in relocating a package inside a car. Prescott mentions that should he refuse, he will expose Ressler's secret and he will go to jail for the murder of Laurel Hitchin.

In "The Informant", while pursuing a criminal associated Prescott calls Ressler again, warning him if he pursues his clients, he will call off the deal and Ressler will go to jail. With Red's help, Ressler discovers Prescott's real name is Mitchell Hatley and gives chase. Despite Ressler wanting to see him go to trial and be imprisoned, Red and his men attack and stop the FBI transport convoy and Red burns the imprisoned Prescott alive inside the vehicle.

=== Ian Garvey ===
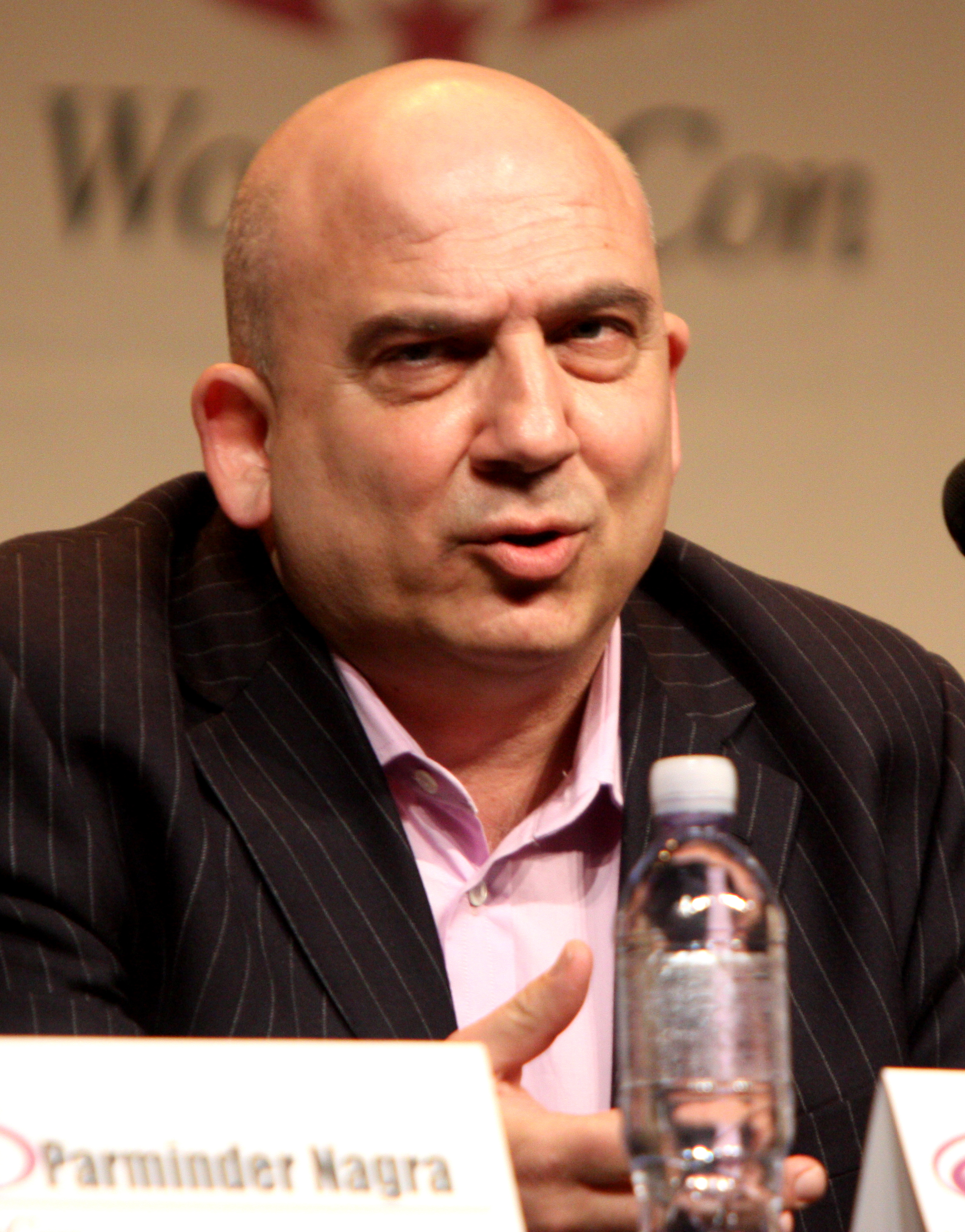
Ian Garvey is portrayed by Jonny Coyne

Portrayed by Jonny Coyne

Ian Garvey (Blacklister No. 13) is a corrupt U.S. Marshal who is running a drug distribution ring. He and his men follow Tom to his home to take both him and Liz hostage. Taking the skeletal remains in a black bag, Garvey orders his men to kill the two. Elizabeth survives while Tom dies from his wounds. While holding on to the skeletal remains, Garvey later discovers a DNA test was done on the remains and learns who the remains belong to.

In "Pattie Sue Edwards", Garvey discovers that Singleton had learned the truth and forewarned that if he pursued criminal charges against him, Singleton's family will die. He kills Singleton to ensure his secret remains safe, but one person witnessed the murder unfold.

In "The Capricorn Killer", Garvey meets up with Red in a motel room with knowledge of the skeletal remains. He mentions that Red should tell him why the remains are important to him. Red refuses but mentions he will get rid of the witness and his family if he doesn't go public with the information. Despite Garvey agreeing to it, he also warns that if Red kills him, the truth in how Katarina died will be exposed.

In "Anna Gracia-Duerte", Garvey attempts to take Liz and Aram hostage, both are looking for the witness' whereabouts. However, Red foils this plan and rescues them. He later calls Garvey up, telling him that he knew he tried to take his daughter from him and also that he knows of his illegal dealings.

In "Zarak Mosadek", Garvey meets at a bar with a woman who is revealed to be Jennifer Reddington and works as a bartender. It's later revealed that he put her into the Witness Protection Program to protect her from Red and from an abusive past she and her mother both endured from him.

In "Ian Garvey: Conclusion", Garvey meets Jennifer at a park in Baltimore and tells her what he plans to do to Red. However, Red strikes first with the help of Sinclair using a double to pose as him, while the real Garvey is taken, hostage. While being held hostage, Red explains there's a manhunt going on for his arrest in the murder of Zarak Mosadek. While en route to collect the duffel bag containing the mysterious remains, Garvey rams his car into a parked car and escapes while leaving Red and Dembe there. He goes over to Paul's Pub to seek Jennifer's help in getting money while instructing her to claim it's a robbery in progress. However, Liz gets to him first via a back door and orders Garvey to tell her the whereabouts of the duffel bag. Ian soon learns about her connection to Red from Jennifer.

At the end of "Ian Garvey: Conclusion", Garvey is shot several times by Liz and Dembe when he attempts to kill Red, leaving him severely wounded. Wanting to know what Garvey knows about the bones, Liz attempts to save his life and he is rushed to the hospital where the doctors announce that they are losing his pulse. At the beginning of "Nicholas T. Moore", it's confirmed in a conversation between Red and Liz that Garvey died of his wounds. However, Liz is not happy as the answers that he possessed had died along with him.

At the beginning of "Lawrence Devlin", Red learns from Joe that the duffel bag containing the unidentified bones that Reddington is seeking is in Costa Rica with a man who was claimed to be deceased, but is alive due to Garvey keeping him in Witness Protection.

=== Bastien Moreau ===
Portrayed by Christopher Lambert

Bastien Moreau (Blacklister No. 20) also known as The Corsican, is an expert assassin shrouded in so much mystery that his mere existence has long been considered a myth—and he is willing to go to any lengths to regain his anonymity after his true identity is uncovered. Moreau is a terrorist with an anti-globalist, nationalist political ideology. He underwent plastic surgery to disguise his identity before attempting to bomb the UN. After assassinating Ana Ziegler on the orders of Anna McMahon, he discovers McMahon had manipulated him into killing Ziegler under pretenses and turns against her. He is killed by President Diaz's aides to prevent him from giving information to the FBI.

=== Anna McMahon ===
Portrayed by Jennifer Ferrin

Anna McMahon (Blacklister No. 60), is an assistant US Attorney General who is masterminding a criminal conspiracy with President Diaz. She hires Bastien Moreau to bomb the UN and then to assassinate Ava Ziegler, a German intelligence officer in possession of a file containing compromising information on the conspiracy. She vehemently opposes staying Reddington's execution but is overruled by the President when Cooper threatens to go public about Ziegler's assassination. She is later assigned to be the Justice Department's liaison with the Task Force. Reddington believes she is connected with a terrorist group called the Third Estate, but this turns out to be a red herring planted by McMahon to divert the Task Force's attention. Eventually, McMahon becomes aware the Task Force is actively investigating her involvement in the conspiracy. After Liz and Ressler retrieve Ziegler's file, McMahon has the entire Task Force arrested, framing them for conspiring against the President. After the Task Force escapes and foils the plot, they are recaptured by McMahon and her Secret Service agents but manage to break free with Reddington's help. McMahon is about to kill Reddington when Dembe arrives and kills her.

=== Ivan Stepanov ===
Portrayed by David E. Harrison

Ivan Stepanov (Blacklister No. 5) is a Russian spymaster that works for the SVR and the Zaslon subunit, where he was responsible for running black operations. A protegee of Dominic Wilkinson, Stepanov has been a longtime friend and ally to Raymond Reddington and is the former handler of Katarina Rostova. He and Reddington are part of a select few with access and knowledge to a blackmail file known as the Sikorsky Archive. He appears to see himself as a handler of Reddington, although Reddington makes it clear to him that he does not see it that way. Eventually, Stepanov is kidnapped by Neville Townsend and interrogated about his relationship with Reddington and Keen. Under duress he whispers a confession to Neville that immediately sets Neville on a mission to kill Elizabeth to torture Red. In the aftermath, Ivan meets Elizabeth for the first time, and to his shock realizes he recognizes her as Masha Rostova. Liz learns he was a protege of Dominic Wilkinson and closely involved with her mother. In private, Ivan chokes up with emotion over finally getting to see Masha after 35 years only to put a target on her back. In Nachalo, it's revealed that Ivan was an old friend of both Dom and Katarina and served as Katarina's KGB handler. Later, Ivan had been the person to steal the Sikorsky Archive after Katarina's faked death which became the central core of Red's criminal empire. Neville Townsend is revealed to have learned the truth about Katarina and Red from Ivan during his torture which is why Townsend had started hunting for Liz.

=== Rakitin ===
Portrayed by Seth Numrich

Andrew Patterson (Blacklister No. 28) is a Russian hacker and deep cover SVR double agent, codenamed Rakitin, who uses his security clearance within the U.S. government to funnel top secret intelligence to N-13 through Ivan Stepanov. Patterson pays Red an impromptu visit in the backseat of Red’s car, where Patterson reveals his name has come up in a U.S. House Select Committee on Intelligence investigation. Patterson wants Red to make the problem go away, and is also concerned about staying in the good graces of a company called Scuti Global. Red is being called upon by Ivan Stepanov over concerns about Elizabeth Keen. Later, Red and Dembe leverage a staffer in the House intel offices named Guinevere Claflin to get her to delete the Patterson investigation files from the House servers in exchange for a new identity, cash, and her tax evasion is ignored. Later, out of fear for his identity to be revealed, Patterson kidnaps Harold Cooper after using Congressman Russell Friedenberg as a lure, offering him to trade his life for his daughter's safety. Friedenberg calls Cooper to a meeting at a parking structure, where Friedenberg is killed and Cooper walks into Patterson's trap. He gets kidnapped to a warehouse and Reddington is unable to call it off. Reddington then tracks Patterson to the warehouse and saves Cooper, while Patterson is taken into FBI custody. Cooper calls Cynthia Panabaker to get a confession from Patterson, but Reddington manages to kill Patterson via a lethal piece of paper after he blackmails Alina Park into slippling this into Patterson's interrogation room. Cooper remains convinced that Reddington is N-13.

=== Neville Townsend ===
Portrayed by Reg Rogers (Season 8)

Neville Townsend was a drug lord and crime lord in Russia with ties to the Russian Bratva, that used his ports to move their drugs. 30 years ago, as the result of N-13's actions, his narcotics smuggling operation was exposed. Because of that, the Bratva's Vory murdered his family as a warning to not turn state's evidence against them. The tragedy left him emotionally scarred and unable to sleep with a stable pattern. Believing N-13 to be Katarina Rostova, due to his KGB sources, Townsend created the Townsend Directive, a dead-only bounty on Katarina Rostova. Townsend himself was mentioned in a flashback scene between Ilya Koslov and Dominic Wilkinson in a cafe in Belgrade, where Dom was explaining the formation of the Townsend Directive. In "The Cyranoid," he allies with Elizabeth Keen in order to take down the real N-13, Reddington, the one responsible for the murder of his family. He tries to get to him in all costs, ending his attempts in "Ivan Stepanov," when he captures the second assassin, Ivan, and tortures him to get more information about Red. Instead, he’s given that Liz is Red’s daughter, so he decides to kill her in Red’s sight to complete his revenge. He orders The Protean to assassinate Liz, but he fails, so Townsend takes the situation under his own control. In "Nachalo," he attacks Red’s bunker and kills all of the analysts, but he is blown up with all of his squad by Reddington after hearing apologies for killing his family from him.

=== Elias VanDyke ===
Portrayed by Lukas Hassel (Season 8)

Elias VanDyke was a proud, loyal enforcer in Neville Townsend’s organization who carried out their operations and led highly trained teams on regular missions. He was often a point man in Neville’s hunt for Reddington, and later for Elizabeth Keen. After Townsend died in "Nachalo," he up took the purpose of hunting Elizabeth down. In "Konets," he succeeded in it and murdered Liz just before she was going to shoot Red, but he is killed by Red afterwards. The question of how VanDyke reached Liz and where he retrieved such information from is proposed as a lead mystery in the next season. In "Caleum Bank," it's revealed that Marvin Gerard was responsible for VanDyke finding and murdering her.

== The Cabal ==
The Cabal is a powerful clandestine organization, a shadow government orchestrating assassinations and international conflicts, responsible for many key events in the series, from the arson at Elizabeth Keen's former house to the bombing in Kursk for which Milos Kirchoff (Berlin) was framed. The core members of this group are greatly concerned with retrieving the Fulcrum, a blackmail file that can bring down many of the most influential men and women in the world.

Member	Country	Career	Status	Actor	Appearance(s)
Diane Fowler	(United States)	The United States Assistant Attorney General; Head of Criminal Division of the Department of Justice; Alan Fitch's follower	Deceased	Jane Alexander	"The Freelancer"; "Anslo Garrick: Conclusion"; "The Good Samaritan"; "The Cyprus Agency"
The Man with the Apple		Spy; Stalker in the former Keen residence	Deceased	Graeme Malcolm	"Wujing"; "The Courier"; "Gina Zanetakos"; "General Ludd"; "Anslo Garrick: Conclusion"
Alan Fitch; The Decembrist	(United States)	Assistant Director of National Intelligence	Deceased	Alan Alda	"Anslo Garrick: Conclusion"; "The Good Samaritan"; "The Kingmaker"; "Berlin: Conclusion"; "The Decembrist"
Walter Gary Martin	(United States)	Alan Fitch's right-hand man; FBI agent initially in charge of investigating the disappearance of Diane Fowler	Active	Jason Butler Harner	"Madeline Pratt"; "Berlin"; "Berlin: Conclusion"; "Lord Baltimore"
Thomas Connolly; Smiling Tommy	(United States)	The United States Assistant Attorney General; United States Attorney General	Deceased	Reed Birney	"The Judge"; "The Kenyon Family"; "T. Earl King IV"; "Tom Keen"; "Leonard Caul"; "Quon Zhang"; "Karakurt"; "Tom Connolly"
Kiryl Morozov	(Russia)	Alan Fitch's follower; Responsible for the 1991 Kursk bombing for which Reddington and Berlin were both framed	Deceased	Alon Moni Aboutboul	"The Decembrist"
Peter Kotsiopulos; The Director	(United States)	Director of the CIA's National Clandestine Service (NCS); One of the Cabal's leaders	Deceased	David Strathairn	"Luther Braxton"; "Luther Braxton: Conclusion"; "Vanessa Cruz"; "Leonard Caul"; "Quon Zhang"; "The Troll Farmer"; "Arioch Cain"; "Sir Crispin Crandall"; "Zal Bin Hasaan"; "The Director"; "The Director: Conclusion"
Roger Hobbs	(United States)	Owner of the Longevity Initiative; Owner of Sadovo Solutions	Deceased	Ralph Brown	"The Longevity Initiative"; "Vanessa Cruz"
Kenneth Jasper		The Director's follower	Unknown	James A. Stephens	"Vanessa Cruz"; "Quon Zhang"
Leonard Caul (born Joseph McCray)	(United States)	A key figure from Reddington's past; Former CIA spy; Creator of the Fulcrum	Active	Ned Van Zandt	"The Kenyon Family"; "The Deer Hunter"; "Leonard Caul"; "Quon Zhang"; "Karakurt"; "Tom Connolly"; "The Djinn"
Karakurt	(Russia)	Foreign Intelligence Service assassin; Terrorist	Captured	Michael Massee (season 2); Andrew Divoff (season 3)	"Quon Zhang"; "Karakurt"; "Tom Connolly"; "Sir Crispin Crandall"; "Zal Bin Hasaan"; "Kings of the Highway"; "The Director"; "The Director: Conclusion"
Matias Solomon	(Ethiopia)	Senior Cabal operative	Active	Edi Gathegi	"The Troll Farmer"; "Marvin Gerard"; "Eli Matchett"; "Arioch Cain"; "Sir Crispin Crandall"; "Zal Bin Hasaan"; "Kings of the Highway"; "The Director"; "Mr. Solomon"; "Mr. Solomon: Conclusion"; "Alexander Kirk"
Susan Hanover	(United States)	CTO of Verdiant Industries	Captured	Cindy Katz	"Eli Matchett"
Laurel Hitchin	(United States)	National security advisor to the President; Former Assistant Secretary of State	Deceased	Christine Lahti	"Arioch Cain"; "Zal Bin Hasaan"; "Kings of the Highway"; "The Director"; "The Director: Conclusion"; "Susan Hargrave"; "The Lindquist Concern"; "Dr. Bogdan Krilov"; "Mr. Kaplan: Conclusion"; "Smokey Putnum"

== Supporting characters ==
=== Introduced in season one ===
- Charles Baker as Newton "Grey" Phillips, Reddington's mysterious aide and bodyguard. Feeling threatened for his family's safety by the Cabal, Grey is forced to betray Reddington to Anslo Garrick. Reddington kills Grey through suffocation, but not before promising him that his family would be protected. ^{Ep.1–11}
- Deborah S. Craig as Luli Zheng, one of Reddington's bodyguards and his money manager. She has evaded the SEC twice. In full view of Red, she is killed by Anslo Garrick. ^{Ep.1–9}
- Rachel Brosnahan as Lucy Brooks/Jolene Parker, a woman posing as a substitute teacher who tries to seduce Tom Keen before revealing she knows his secret. Her primary interest, like Tom's, is Raymond Reddington, and she is revealed to be another of Berlin's operatives. She is killed by Tom Keen.^{Ep.1–16}
- Bazzel Baz as Baz, the commander of Reddington's military detail who accompanies him during covert operations and gunfights. He moves into the apartment across from Liz to protect her per Reddington's orders. ^{Ep.3–14} He fights alongside Reddington, Dembe, and the task force during Liz and Tom's wedding when Matias Solomon's forces raid the wedding chapel. ^{Ep.3–17} Baz is shot by Kaplan when he attempted to get her out of the car.
- Jason Butler Harner as Walter Gary Martin, an FBI agent who initially investigated the disappearance of Diane Fowler.
- William Sadler as Sam Milhoan, a prolific criminal who became Elizabeth's adoptive father once her biological father was killed and her mother Katarina disappeared. He truly raised her despite her believing that she raised herself. Sam was friends with both Reddington and Katarina. However, while in a hospital, when Sam insists on telling Elizabeth "the truth", he dies after Reddington smothers him with a pillow.
- Dikran Tulaine as Max Ruddiger, a professional bomb maker.
- Emily Tremaine as Audrey Bidwell, Ressler's former fiancée who broke up with him due to his obsession with capturing Reddington, but who attempts to rebuild a relationship with him after the events of Episode 10 of season 1, "Anslo Garrick Conclusion". She was shot and believed to be killed by Mako Tanida but was in fact killed by Bobby Jonica. When Ressler was clearing up her things, he discovers a pregnancy test and realizes she was pregnant with their child. ^{Ep.1–16}
- Lance Reddick as "The Cowboy", a mysterious private bounty hunter whom Reddington hires to track down Jolene Parker. He is killed by Tom Keen.^{Ep.1–16}
- Joseph Siravo as Niko Demakis, a business partner in Reddington's syndicate who eventually turned on Reddington and was killed for his disloyalty.
- Geraldine Hughes as Dr. Nina Buckner, a CDC epidemiologist intelligence officer from which Keen and Ressler seek help when confronted by biological weapons.
- Teddy Coluca as Teddy Brimley, Red's skilled interrogator who uses unusual items to extract information from unwilling subjects

=== Introduced in season two ===
- Sahr Ngaujah as Yaabari, a Cameroonian warlord whom Reddington extorted for information about Berlin. He later bought Reddington in a human trafficking auction and was killed as Elizabeth was rescuing Reddington.
- Adriane Lenox as Reven Wright, Diane Fowler's replacement. She was murdered by Laurel Hitchin in the season 3 episode, "Kings of the Highway", to conceal her connection to Matias Solomon. In the season 4 finale, Ressler locates her body with the help of Reddington, and obtains proof that Hitchin killed her.
- Hal Ozsan as Ezra, Liz's mysterious guardian hired by Reddington.
- Mary-Louise Parker as Naomi Hyland/Carla Reddington, Reddington's ex-wife. She was kidnapped by Berlin as part of his vendetta against Reddington. She and Reddington have a daughter, Jennifer, whose whereabouts are unknown until Season 5. It's revealed that Naomi was eventually murdered which Jennifer suspects was one of Reddington's enemies was responsible for.
- Lee Tergesen as Frank Hyland, Naomi's husband.
- Paul Reubens as Mr. Vargas, a double agent for Reddington assigned to spy on Niko Demakis. During the events of Season 3, Vargas is revealed to have been in league with the Cabal associate Matias Solomon, and is fatally shot by Reddington for his treachery.
- Dante Nero as Samuel Aleko a.k.a. "The Samoan", a former confidential informant of Meera Malik, later employed by Elizabeth to hold Tom Keen prisoner.
- Clark Middleton as Glen Carter, a skiptracer who uses his position at the Department of Motor Vehicles to access personal information needed to locate people and objects. In season 8, Glen dies of West Nile virus off-screen, something that happened in real life to his actor Clark Middleton. Red organizes a special memorial service for Glen with the help of Dembe and Huey Lewis and spreads his ashes on the Statue of Liberty where Reddington delivers an emotional and touching eulogy.
- Scottie Thompson as Zoe D'Antonio, Milos Kirchoff's biological daughter. Thought dead by Berlin, she is tracked down by Reddington to clear up the misunderstanding that started their war.
- Franklin Ojeda Smith as Eugene Ames, a Metro Police officer, and DC harbormaster who found Tom Keen in the boat where he was imprisoned. He was killed by Tom, which triggered an investigation that nearly brought murder charges against Elizabeth.
- Valarie Pettiford as Charlene Cooper, Harold Cooper's wife.
- Michael Kostroff as Martin Wilcox, a Detective investigating Eugene Ames's disappearance.
- John Finn as Richard Denner, a Superior Court judge who hears the case against Elizabeth in the death of Eugene Ames.
- Piter Marek as Nik Korpal, Liz's former boyfriend and practicing doctor, who was coerced into working for Red. In "Leonard Caul", Nik accepts payment for helping save Red's life. In "Drexel", it is revealed that Nik has become an on-call doctor for Reddington. In "Mr. Solomon: Conclusion", Nik helps to deliver Agenes, Liz, and Tom's daughter. Tom goes to Nik to ask for help identifying the remains inside the suitcase in "Greyson Blaise". In "The Endling", Nik bargains for release from Red's employment but he is killed by Ian Garvey after trying to obtain the identity of the remains inside the suitcase.
- Jack Koenig as Dr. Levin, Harold Cooper's doctor who is forced by The Cabal to give him a drug created by Leo Andropov that simulate symptoms of a deadly brain tumor.

=== Introduced in season three ===
- Peter Vack as Asher Sutton, a wealthy socialite whom Tom Keen exploits to track Karakurt. Tom kills him when both men are captured by an underground street-fighting ring and forced to fight to the death.
- Conor Leslie as Gwen Hollander, Asher Sutton's girlfriend.
- Tony Plana as Mr. Diaz, the Foreign Minister of Venezuela. He assists Reddington in bringing down the Director.
- Deirdre Lovejoy as Cynthia Panabaker, the White House Counsel, who replaces Reven Wright as the DOJ's contact with the Task Force.
- Brian Dennehy (seasons 3–7), C.J. Wilson (seasons 6–7) and Ron Raines (season 8) as Dominic Wilkinson, Katarina Rostova's father and Liz's birth grandfather who blames Reddington for unexplained things that happened to his family, even knowing certain secrets about Red himself. He tasked Dom in hiding a box containing a key for an island off the coast of Brunei. Red explained he was trying to avoid coming back to Dom after the first time because of both the war with Kaplan and his need to protect Dom. He tells Dom that if he doesn't return alive and Kaplan kills him, Red asks Dom to find Liz and tell the truth about him being her grandfather. In "The Invisible Hand", after Liz questions him about his involvement as a Soviet spy, he calls Red to inform him that she is getting closer to the truth and that he needs to tell her soon. It's later revealed that he is aware of Reddington being an imposter. In "The Brockton College Killer", Liz learns he is her maternal grandfather and visits him. In "Rassvet", Dominic claims that he was Katarina's KGB handler and that he fled Russia for America to escape the Soviet government's retribution for Katarina's treason after helping Katarina escape the authorities. He also manipulates Liz into believing that Katarina's childhood friend, Ilya Koslov, became Reddington to protect both her and Katarina. Reddington takes refuge at his house after fleeing from Katarina's custody; when she tries to recapture him, Dom is severely injured in the crossfire and falls into a coma. After Liz reconnects with her mother, she finds out about Dom's lie, making her side with Katarina to discover the truth about who Red really is. In "Katarina: Conclusion", Dom dies from his injuries after Liz brings him to Katarina and forces him to awake from his coma, suffering hallucinations of Katarina as a young woman. Before he dies, he is found by Red and tells him that he told them everything.
- Benito Martinez as Robert Diaz, a U.S. Senator and the favored presidential candidate of Alexander Kirk, his campaign accounts were looted by the Task Force and Solomon to draw out Kirk. Later revealed to have won the presidency. In "Lipet's Seafood Company", Red extorts Diaz into providing a Presidential pardon for Liz's killing of Tom Conolly. In Season 6, he conspires with Anna McMahon in a convoluted plot that is apparently intended to end in his own assassination. The Task Force foils the plot, and it is revealed that Diaz was actually trying to kill his wife to prevent her from revealing his involvement in killing a man in a hit-and-run accident. He is then forced to resign and faces a criminal investigation by the FBI.
- Oded Fehr as Levi Shur, Samar's former partner in Mossad. It is implied he and Samar were romantically involved. He reconnects with Samar when he comes to the US in pursuit of the terrorist Zal Bin Hassan, who turns out to be her brother Shahin. In "The Osterman Umbrella Company", he discovers Samar is suffering from vascular dementia and reports this to Mossad, leading to them putting out a contract on her life. In retaliation, Reddington kills him.

=== Introduced in season four ===
- Joselin Reyes as Romina, a woman working with Mato to kidnap Agnes in Cuba, later to be arrested at the end of "The Thrushes"
- Annapurna Sriram as Odette, a lawyer whose mother once worked for Alexander Kirk as a housekeeper. She is of Russian descent and resents Liz for having Alexander Kirk's affections. In "The Thrushes", she is seen in bed together with Alexander Kirk, revealing that she is his lover. Odette confronted Liz about her parentage during their fight in "Dr. Adrian Shaw: Conclusion". However, when Ressler and Samar appear, rather than let themselves be arrested, Odette commits suicide by jumping in the water.
- Annie Heise as Janet Sutherland, an NSA agent who was first introduced as Aram's girlfriend. She was mistrusted by Ressler and Samar who believe she is a spy for Alexander Kirk. Their suspicion was confirmed in "The Thrushes" and Aram realized who Janet really was. She returns to assist him in "The Architect" and they resume dating for a bit. In "Dembe Zuma", she shakes Samar up when she discovers her feelings for Aram. He ends his relationship with Janet for good when he discovered that she testified against him to get her criminal record expunged
- Enrique Murciano as Julian Gale, a Special Agent with the FBI and an old friend of Donald Ressler. He is totally dedicated to pursuing Reddington, and he and Ressler worked together on the FBI's anti-Reddington task force before it was disbanded. He is assigned to investigate the murders of the eighty-six individuals whose bodies Mr. Kaplan exhumed, among which is Diane Fowler's. He discovers fingerprint evidence potentially linking Reddington to Fowler's murder, but it proves inconclusive. He decides to investigate Liz Keen in hopes that she will lead him to Reddington. When they meet, Liz has serious mistrust in Gale suspecting he may be up to something. Her suspicion proved correct in The Debt Collector when she spots Gale shooting Red. In "Mr. Kaplan/Mr. Kaplan Conclusion", it's revealed that Gale is working with Kaplan to help destroy Red and the Task Force. When he confronts her later on about losing the immunity deal between Red and the FBI believing it was his only chance to indict them, she tells Gale that he still has her and her testimony could help him in exchange for her gaining immunity. Later on, Gale is confronted by Hitchin who warns him and those involved with the inquiry to drop the case against the FBI. When he confronts her with the belief that Red bribed her, Hitchin threatens Gale into compliance by warning him she could still revoke his badge if he continues to investigate further. Gale calls Kaplan to inform her about the cancellation of the grand jury. Heading inside his car in anger, Red and Dembe confront Gale and takes his burner phone to locate Kaplan and Liz.
- Leon Rippy as The Hunter, a loner who saves Mr. Kaplan from death after Red shoots her and leaves her for dead. He bombs his home and commits suicide rather than reveal Mr. Kaplan's whereabouts to Red.
- Matt Servitto as Sebastian Reifler, a doctor treating Alexander Kirk, the Task Force uses his association with Kirk to track down Kirk.

=== Introduced in season five ===
- Alex Shimizu as Tadashi Ito, a technological genius who turned down early admission to Harvard and a job working at Facebook when he was 14. He eventually started working for Raymond Reddington by the time he was 15, much to the disapproval of his mother.
- Michael Aronov as Joe "Smokey" Putnum, a circus carney and master of logistics who attempted to steal money from a neo-Nazi drug-smuggling cartel. He was saved from prosecution by Red and recruited to be Red's new right-hand man in his reformed organization. In season 6, he secretly uses Reddington's resources to build a drug smuggling operation while the latter is imprisoned. In "Lady Luck", Reddington discovers his betrayal and kills Smokey.
- Aida Turturro as Heddie Hawkins, Smokey's partner in their attempt to steal money from a neo-Nazi drug-smuggling cartel. She was freed from imprisonment by Red and recruited to be Red's new money manager in his reformed organization.
- Evan Parke as Norman Singleton, an NYPD detective serving as a member of Ian Garvey's task force who was introduced in "The Informant". He investigates Liz Keen's involvement in the death of one of Garvey's henchmen over a few episodes. In "Mr. Raleigh Sinclair III", after learning about her plans to track down Tom's murderers, Singleton convinces her to let him assist her in it. In "Pattie Sue Edwards", Singleton is killed by Garvey after he finds out the truth.
- Fiona Dourif as Lillian May Roth (born Jennifer Reddington), a bartender who works at Pete's Tavern, in Baltimore. Liz takes her to the apartment she lives in to try to get her cooperation. In turn, Lillian revealed that Garvey was visiting her because he protected her and her mother, Naomi, from Red when he was abusing them. She also mentions that she is Red's daughter named Jennifer and that she had been in Witness Protection for 20 years. In "Ian Garvey: Conclusion" Jennifer confronts Ian for Tom's death and asks him if he will kill Red. Ian doesn't answer her but admits the past 20 years she has lived in hiding has been a lie. Jennifer finally confronts Red, asking him if he was even happy to see her again, and admits her disappointment when he barely recognizes her. She tells him that Ian rescued her from the disappointment that she and Naomi both faced when they learned about his criminal career. In "Sutton Ross", Jennifer joins Liz in her quest for revenge and to expose the imposter after realizing that the bones belonged to the real Raymond Reddington. In "The Corsican", she helps Liz get Red arrested to prevent him from becoming aware of their investigation. In "Marko Jankowics", Jennifer, fearing that she is becoming as ethically compromised as Red, decides to abandon Liz's search for Red's true identity. In "The Protean", she is assassinated by the Protean, a hitman hunting for Liz.
- Karl Miller as Pete McGee, a disgraced doctor who assists Tom in his quest to identify the bones given to him by Mr. Kaplan. Pete disappears after Nik is interrogated and killed. Tom finds him later, but Ian Garvey kills him.
- Ana Nogueira as Lena Mercer, Pete's girlfriend who reluctantly assists Tom with his search for Pete. Ian Garvey kills her after determining that she is unable to provide any useful information.
- Lenny Venito as Tony Pagliaro/"The Mailman", a corrupt U.S. Postal Service employee who manages a ring of thieves that use postal vacation notices to steal from unsuspecting postal customers. Red discovers his scheme and adapts it to create a network of safe houses for criminals trying to avoid detection. He later serves as Red's henchman on dangerous jobs.
- Happy Anderson as Bobby Navarro, one of Ian Garvey's henchmen, tasked with killing Tom and Liz. He fails and Liz later kills him in a close-quarters fight.

=== Introduced in season six ===
- Christopher Lambert as Bastien Moreau, AKA The Corsican, an assassin for hire obsessed with keeping his true identity secret. He has extremist nationalist beliefs and will only act to advance his political beliefs. He has his appearance altered by Dr. Hans Koehler to look like a specific security official so that he can bomb the United Nations but is foiled by the Task Force. Anna McMahon then tricks him into retrieving an important file with compromising information about President Diaz. Moreau views the file and discovers that McMahon lied to him and vows to find out why. He is killed by Mr. Sandquist before he can reveal what he knows about the file.
- Becky Ann Baker as Roberta Wilkins, the Federal judge overseeing Red's trial. She is a serious and sober jurist who is troubled by the government's initial denials of involvement with Red and then the government's apparent extortion of Red to obtain a guilty plea in his trial.
- Ken Leung as Michael Sima, the assistant U. S. Attorney prosecuting Red. He is a capable attorney but demonstrates himself to be capable of unethical behavior in his zeal to convict Red of his crimes.
- Mike Boland as Jim Macatee, the warden of the Federal prison where Red is being held, prisoner. Macatee successfully pressures Red into mediating a dispute between rival prison gangs. Red later subdues and impersonates Macatee as part of a failed plan to escape the prison.
- Coy Stewart as Vontae Jones, a young prison inmate befriended by Red. Vontae provides Red insight into the prisoners and their allegiances. He also scrounges for hard to find items in prison for Red. Red arranges for Vontae to be paroled after his immunity agreement is restored.
- Ben Horner as Mr. Sandquist, a Secret Service agent and body man for President Diaz who also serves as an assassin for Anna McMahon. He kills Bastien Moreau to prevent the truth about her plot from being revealed. He attempts to kill First Lady Miriam Diaz to prevent her from telling the truth about President Diaz's hit and run accident but fails. He is killed by Ressler in a shootout.
- Brett Cullen as The Stranger, an old friend of Reddington who appears to know many secrets about his past. Reddington calls on his help to pursue Katarina Rostova. At one point, he goes by the name of Frank Bloom. Eventually, Katarina kidnaps him, addressing him as Ilya Koslov, and tortures him to obtain information on an attempt on her life that he helped engineer with Dom. Katarina reveals to Liz that the Stranger is in fact the real Ilya Koslov and that Dom had lied about Reddington being Ilya. Reddington later rescues "Frank" after Katarina flees.

=== Introduced in season seven ===
- Natalie Paul as Francesca "Frankie" Campbell, a former combat medic initially in Katarina Rostova's employ. She helps free Reddington from captivity, later revealing that Katarina had ordered her to allow him to escape. Reddington takes her under his wing and has her perform various odd jobs for him. Eventually, Reddington stages an elaborate ruse to test her loyalty as he grooms her to take Samar's place on the Task Force. When she fails the test and attempts to betray him to Katarina, Reddington kills her.
- Elizabeth Bogush as Elodie Radcliffe, a wealthy, thrill-seeking woman whose husband was severely brain-damaged after participating in a gathering of Les Fleurs de Mal. She goes undercover with Aram to infiltrate the group and help the FBI bring them down. Aram saves her from death when she is selected to play the group's lethal game. After the FBI arrests Les Fleurs de Mal, she and Aram begin an intimate relationship. Eventually, her husband dies, and Aram becomes suspicious after learning she stands to inherit millions from his estate. His investigation reveals Elodie murdered her husband, and Aram then has her arrested.

=== Introduced in season eight ===
- LaChanze as Anne Foster, a widowed bird-watcher who Reddington befriends while watching birds in Central Park. After seeing Anne at the park again, Reddington takes her on a dinner date at a chocolate shop and invites her to see a midnight screening of North by Northwest. Ultimately, as per Dembe's advice to not spend any more time with Anne, Reddington is forced to stand her up. However, in the episode entitled, "Anne", it is revealed that Reddington and Anne have been carrying on a secret relationship. During a struggle between Reddington and Liz, Anne hits her head and later dies of her injuries.

=== Introduced in season nine ===
- Diany Rodriguez as Weecha Xiu, Reddington's new bodyguard from Cuba. She joins Red alongside her sister, Mierce. Unlike Dembe, she prefers using blades to shotguns, but she can handle any weapon effectively. She tries not to interfere into his criminal conversations, and only acts in critical situations. She also helps Red work through his mental conditions and is a connector between him and Mierce after her farewell.
- Colby Lewis as Peter Simpson, Park's husband. He is strongly opposed to Park working with the Task Force and taking down criminals as he worries about it affecting their family life. In "Benjamin T. Okara", Park loses her and Peter’s embryon during the seek for a blacklister, leaving him frustrated and more willing her to leave FBI. In "The Conglomerate", it is revealed that Peter was a holder of a hotel network, and Park met him first as a target she had to assassinate, but fell in love with him and left her job. However, her works with Red had a spillover to Peter, when one of the murderers is sent to kill Peter. She violently bludgeons him to death, finally breaking her bumpy relationships being with Peter.
- Karina Arroyave as Mierce Xiu, a shaman from Cuba, Weecha's sister, and Reddington's love interest, who works on his mental conditions after losing Liz. When Reddington comes back, she prompts to break down with his past. When Reddington started digging into Liz's death and confronts Dembe, she decides to leave Red and Weecha and comes back to Cuba.
- Danny Mastrogiorgio as Lew Sloan, Cooper’s friend from the FBI. He is loyal to Cooper and tries to justify him after he was drugged and presumably murdered Doug Koster, becoming more and more tangled in the investigation within each his step. But when Cooper is arrested and FBI comes for him, he betrays Cooper and exposes him, ditching their friendship.
- Mike Houston as Heber, a respectful and honest policeman, who investigates in the murder of Doug Koster, trying to find Cooper’s connection to it and expose him. Every move made by Cooper makes Heber more concerned that his alibi provided by Charlene is a counterfeit, keeping him in the investigation.
- Joe Carroll as Andrew Kennison, an MIT student and a founder of a tracker used to locate a person and track his amount of medicine taken. He becomes a point in both searches of Cooper and Reddington to find Cooper’s blackmailer and the one responsible for Liz’s death.

== Episode links ==
^Ep 1–9 "Anslo Garrick". The Blacklist. November 25, 2013. NBC.
^Ep 1–10 "Anslo Garrick Conclusion". The Blacklist. December 2, 2013. NBC.
^Ep 1–11 "The Good Samaritan". The Blacklist. January 13, 2014. NBC.
^Ep 1–16 "Mako Tanida". The Blacklist. March 17, 2014. NBC.
