= List of female chefs with Michelin stars =

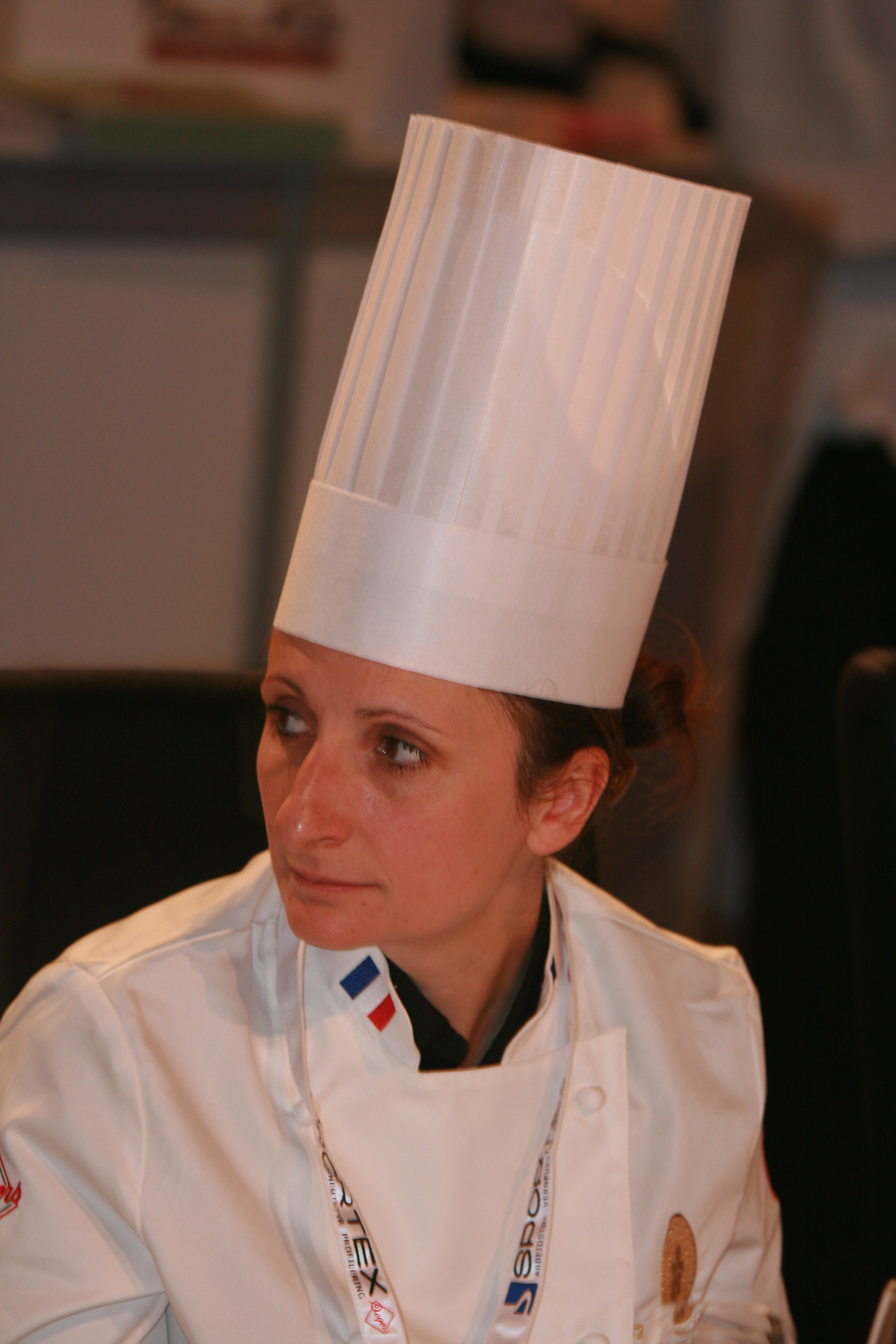
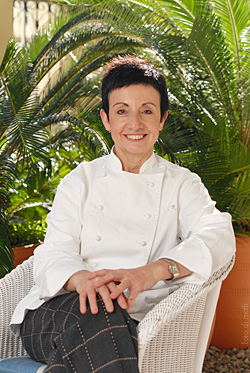
Anne-Sophie Pic (left) and Carme Ruscalleda (right), two female chefs who hold three Michelin stars

Women chefs were among some of the earliest to be awarded Michelin stars. Within the Michelin Guide, stars were first introduced in 1926 with the present three star system added in 1931. When three stars were first awarded in 1933, two female chefs, Eugénie Brazier and Marie Bourgeois, were among them. Several female chefs have been awarded three stars since, including Marguerite Bise, Sophie Bise, Nadia Santini, Elena Arzak, Clare Smyth, Anne-Sophie Pic, Carme Ruscalleda and Ana Roš.

In recent years, the number of male chefs awarded stars has greatly outnumbered those given to women. However, there has been an increase in the number of women from different nations awarded, due to the expansion of the areas covered by the guide. The lack of women holding stars has repeatedly led to criticism of the Michelin Guide, who have in turn pointed to the lack of female chefs overall in the industry.

== History ==
The Michelin Guide was first published in 1900 in France to promote driving. In 1926, it began to specialise in fine dining reviews, introducing a single-star system. The current three-star system began in 1931, however, three stars were not awarded until the 1933 edition.

The first women chef to hold a Michelin star was Élisa Blanc in 1929.

The first women chefs to hold three Michelin stars came in that 1933 edition, namely Eugénie Brazier and Marie Bourgeois. However, Brazier won three stars at both of her La Mère Brazier restaurants in Lyon and at Col de la Luère. She held all six for 20 years, and her record for holding the most stars stood until beaten by Alain Ducasse in 1998. It then stood as the record for a female chef until Carme Ruscalleda won her seventh star across several restaurants.

Some female Michelin-starred chefs prefer not to make an issue out of gender. For example, when three-star chef Dominique Crenn was named the world's best female chef by the prestigious World's 50 Best Restaurants List in 2016, she was outraged, considering referring to her gender "diminishing, unnecessary and irrelevant".

=== Recent awards ===
Following the Second World War, Marguerite Bise became the third woman to win three Michelin stars at her restaurant Auberge du Père Bise in 1950. It is then often reported that there was a 50-year gap before Anne-Sophie Pic became the fourth woman to win a set of three stars, despite Bise's granddaughter Sophie regaining the family restaurant's three stars in 1985, and similar awards made by Michelin to female chefs such as Nadia Santini, Elena Arzak and Clare Smyth in the interim.

While the number of women chefs with Michelin stars has increased in recent years, they are still relatively few. This is partly due to the percentage of female chefs; 4.7% of chefs in the United States are women, while the figure is 20% in the United Kingdom. The low number of female chefs with stars has led to criticism of the Michelin Guide, alongside other issues such as the pay gap between male and female chefs.

The problem was raised with Michelin director Michael Ellis following the publication of the 2018 New York City edition, who said that the company "can't do anything" to resolve it. Subsequently, a spokesperson said, "Increasingly, more women are entering the profession in this country and around the world. Michelin is not involved in culinary education or recruitment. We deeply value diversity of all kinds and are pleased to see the trend toward greater diversity in the culinary field."

During the 2025 Great Britain and Ireland awards, Emily Roux, the only woman chef awarded that year, was given an oversized male chef's jacket to put on at the ceremony. Ceremony organizers later played a video of women chefs speaking about topics including children and haircuts that viewers critiqued as patronizing.

== List of female chefs with Michelin stars ==
Key
1 Michelin star	One Michelin star
2 Michelin stars	Two Michelin stars
3 Michelin stars	Three Michelin stars
—	The restaurant did not receive a star that year
Closed	The restaurant is no longer open

- † This symbol denotes chefs who won a Michelin star as an executive chef under a Chef Patron, who is also considered to have won the star.
- ‡ This symbol denotes chefs who won a Michelin star as a co-executive chef alongside another chef.
- § This symbol denotes chefs who initially held stars under a Chef Patron or as a co-executive chef but later retained or earned those stars on their own.

List of female chefs with Michelin stars
Chef	Restaurant	Cuisine	Restaurant Location	Current	Year to star			Ref(s)
Chef	Restaurant	Cuisine	Restaurant Location	Current	1 Michelin star	2 Michelin stars	3 Michelin stars	Ref(s)
Sally Abé	The Harwood Arms (Note: Abé joined the restaurant as executive chef in 2017 while it already held a Michelin star, retaining the designation for several years before her departure in 2021.)	British	United Kingdom – London	—	2017	—	—	
Lisa Allen	Northcote	British	United Kingdom – Langho	1 Michelin star	2004	—	—	
Myrtle Allen	Ballymaloe House	Irish	Ireland – Shanagarry	—	1975	—	—	
Janina Allgaier‡	Bidlabu (Note: Bidlabu had received a Michelin star in previous years before Allgaier joined as co-executive chef.)	Contemporary	Germany – Frankfurt	1 Michelin star	2025	—	—	
Aurelie Altemaire†	L'Atelier de Joël Robuchon	French	United Kingdom – London	Closed	2014	2010	—	
Sheyla Alvarado	Lunario	Mexican	Mexico – El Porvenir	1 Michelin star	2025	—	—	
Lisa Angermann‡	Frieda	Modern	Germany – Leipzig	1 Michelin star	2021	—	—	
Garima Arora	Gaa	Indian	Thailand – Bangkok	2 Michelin stars	2018	2024	—	
Elena Arzak‡	Arzak (Note: Elena Arzak was named co-chef of the restaurant in the late 2000s when it already had 3 Michelin stars. She has retained the restaurant's rating in years following.)	Basque	Spain – San Sebastián	3 Michelin stars	—	—	2009	
Frances Atkins	Yorke Arms	British	United Kingdom – Ramsgill	Closed	2003	—	—	
Mary Attea	The Musket Room	Contemporary	United States – New York City	—	2014	—	—	
Adejoké Bakare	Chishuru	West African	United Kingdom – London	1 Michelin star	2024	—	—	
Jennifer Bañagale-Berdin‡	Kadence	Japanese	United States – Orlando	1 Michelin star	2022	—	—	
Nieves Barragán Mohacho	Barrafina (Note: Barragán Mohacho left the position as head chef at Barrafina in 2017 to open Sabor.)	Spanish	United Kingdom – London	—	2013	—	—	
Nieves Barragán Mohacho	Legado	Spanish	United Kingdom – London	1 Michelin star	2026	—	—	
Nieves Barragán Mohacho	Sabor	Spanish	United Kingdom – London	1 Michelin star	2019	—	—	
Thalía Barrios-García	Levadura de Olla	Oaxacan	Mexico – Oaxaca City	1 Michelin star	2024	—	—	
Danni Barry	Eipic	Irish	United Kingdom – Belfast	Closed	2016	—	—	
Vita Bartininkaite	Pas mus	Modern	Lithuania – Vilnius	1 Michelin star	2024	—	—	
Virginie Basselot	Saint James Paris	French	France – Paris	Closed	2014	—	—	
Caroline Baum	Reisers am Stein	Modern	Germany – Würzburg	Closed	2013	—	—	
Sonja Baumann‡	NeoBiota	Modern	Germany – Cologne	1 Michelin star	2019	—	—	
Emma Bengtsson	Aquavit (Note: Bengtsson was promoted from pastry chef to head chef of Restaurant Aquavit in April 2014; while it held one Michelin star, it was promoted to two-star status later that year.)	Nordic	United States – New York City	2 Michelin stars	2014	2014	—	
Erika Bergheim	Nero	Modern	Germany – Essen	Closed	2009	—	—	
Eugénie Béziat	Espadon	African	France – Paris	1 Michelin star	2024	—	—	
Marguerite Bise	Auberge du Père Bise	French	France – Talloires-Montmin	Closed	—	—	1951	
Sophie Bise	Auberge du Père Bise (Note: Sophie Bise took over as head chef of the restaurant from her father Francois Bise. Prior to Francois, Marguerite Bise (Sophie's grandmother) was the head chef.)	French	France – Talloires-Montmin	Closed	—	1983	1985	
Heidi Bjerkan	Credo	Norwegian	Norway – Trondheim	Closed	2019	—	—	
Élisa Blanc	Villages Blanc	French	France – Vonnas	Closed	1929	1931	—	
April Bloomfield	The Spotted Pig	Gastropub	United States – New York City	Closed	2006	—	—	
Marie Bourgeois	La Mère Bourgeois	French	France – Priay	Closed	—	—	1933	
Cristina Bowerman	Glass Hostaria	Modern	Italy – Rome	1 Michelin star	2010	—	—	
Nicola Braidwood†	Braidwoods	Scottish	United Kingdom – Dalry	Closed	2000	—	—	
Tessa Bramley	Old Vicarage	British	United Kingdom – Sheffield	Closed	1998	—	—	
Eugénie Brazier	La Mère Brazier Lyon	French	France – Lyon	2 Michelin stars	—	1968	1933	
Eugénie Brazier	La Mère Brazier Col de la Luère	French	France – Pollionnay	Closed	—	—	1933	
Nora Breyer‡	Kaupers Restaurant	Modern	Germany – Selzen	1 Michelin star	2012	—	—	
Andrea Carlson	Burdock & Co	Contemporary	Canada – Vancouver	1 Michelin star	2022	—	—	
Shelley Cerneant‡	Applewood Inn	American	United States – Guerneville	Closed	2010	—	—	
Eun-hee Cho	Onjium	Korean	South Korea – Seoul	1 Michelin star	2020	—	—	
Hee-sook Cho	Hansikgonggan	Korean	South Korea – Seoul	—	2019	—	—	
Ali Clem	la Barbecue	Barbecue	United States – Austin	1 Michelin star	2024	—	—	
Amanda Cohen	Dirt Candy	Vegetarian	United States – New York City	1 Michelin star	2022	—	—	
Sarah Cooper‡	Sun Moon Studio	Californian	United States – Oakland	1 Michelin star	2025	—	—	
Nolwenn Corre	Hostellerie de la Pointe Saint-Mathieu	French	France – Finistère	1 Michelin star	2019	—	—	
Laetitia Cosnier‡	Côté Cuisine	French	France – Carnac	1 Michelin star	2019	—	—	
Dominique Crenn	Atelier Crenn	French	United States – San Francisco	3 Michelin stars	2012	2013	2019	
Dominique Crenn	Bar Crenn	Contemporary	United States – San Francisco	—	2019	—	—	
Dominique Crenn	Luce	Mediterranean	United States – San Francisco	Closed	2009	—	—	
Naoëlle D'Hainaut	L'Or Q'idée	French	France – Pontoise	1 Michelin star	2019	—	—	
Hélène Darroze	Hélène Darroze à Villa La Coste	Modern	France – Le Puy-Sainte-Réparade	1 Michelin star	2022	—	—	
Hélène Darroze	Hélène Darroze at the Connaught	Modern	United Kingdom – London	3 Michelin stars	2009	2011	2021	
Hélène Darroze	Marsan	French	France – Paris	2 Michelin stars	2001	2003	—	
Amélie Darvas	Äponem - Auberge du Presbytère	Modern	France – Vailhan	—	2019	—	—	
Macarena de Castro	Maca de Castro	Creative	Spain – Port d'Alcúdia	1 Michelin star	2012	—	—	
Chudaree Debhakam	Baan Tepa	Thai	Thailand – Bangkok	2 Michelin stars	2023	2024	—	
Lydia Del Olmo‡	Ceibe	Galician	Spain – Ourense	1 Michelin star	2023	—	—	
Josefina Diana‡	Angélica Cocina Maestra	Creative	Argentina – Mendoza	1 Michelin star	2025	—	—	
Susi Díaz	La Finca	Creative	Spain – Elche	1 Michelin star	2006	—	—	
Lydia Egloff	La Bonne Auberge	Modern	France – Forbach	—	2015	—	—	
Amanda Eriksson	Wood	Creative	Italy – Breuil-Cervinia	1 Michelin star	2024	—	—	
Nicole Fagegaltier	Le Vieux Pont	French	France – Belcastel	1 Michelin star	2015	—	—	
Jay Fai	Raan Jay Fai	Thai	Thailand – Bangkok	1 Michelin star	2018	—	—	
Eva Fares	As Garzas (Note: Fares was promoted to head chef of As Garzas in 2024, taking over for her father-in-law; and retained its Michelin star rating.)	Galician	Spain – Barizo	1 Michelin star	2024	—	—	
Annie Féolde	Enoteca Pinchiorri	Italian	Italy – Florence	3 Michelin stars	1981	1982	1992	
Cristina Fernandez-Sánchez‡	Solana	Modern	Spain – Ampuero	1 Michelin star	2012	—	—	
Cristina Figueira	El Xato	Mediterranean	Spain – La Nucía	1 Michelin star	2019	—	—	
Cornelia Fischer	Überfahrt	German	Germany – Rottach-Egern	1 Michelin star	2025	—	—	
Michelina Fischetti	Oasis - Sapori Antichi	Italian	Italy – Vallesaccarda	1 Michelin star	2000	—	—	
Serena Fisher‡	7 Adams	Californian	United States – San Francisco	1 Michelin star	2024	—	—	
Sharon Frannais	Le Pẻchẻ Gourmand	Modern	France – Briançon	—	2015	—	—	
Lucía Freitas	A Tafona	Spanish	Spain – Santiago de Compostela	1 Michelin star	2018	—	—	
Beh Gaik-Lean	Auntie Gaik Lean's Old School Eatery	Peranakan	Malaysia – George Town	1 Michelin star	2023	—	—	
Virginie Giboire	Racines	Modern	France – Rennes	1 Michelin star	2019	—	—	
Luciana Giangrandi‡	Boia De	Italian	United States – Miami	1 Michelin star	2022	—	—	
Michelle Goh‡	Mia	Contemporary	Thailand – Bangkok	1 Michelin star	2024	—	—	
Ana Dolores González‡	Esquina Común	Mexican	Mexico – Mexico City	1 Michelin star	2024	—	—	
Elisabeth Grabmer‡	Waldschänke	Austrian	Austria – Grieskirchen	1 Michelin star	2025	—	—	
Tanja Grandits	Stucki	German	Switzerland – Basel	2 Michelin stars	2009	2012	—	
Adeline Grattard	Yam'tcha	Asian Fusion	France – Paris	Closed	2010	—	—	
Rose Gray‡ (Note: Gray died in 2010, but the River Cafe has retained its one star rating headed by co-head chef Ruth Rogers.)	The River Café	Italian	United Kingdom – London	—	1998	—	—	
Suzette Gresham	Acquerello	Italian	United States – San Francisco	2 Michelin stars	2007	2015	—	
Maria Groß	Clara (Note: Groß departed the restaurant in 2015. It has retained its Michelin star with the successor chef.)	Modern	Germany – Erfurt	—	2013	—	—	
Sarah Grueneberg	Spiaggia	Italian	United States – Chicago	Closed	2011	—	—	
Fernanda Guerrero‡	Araya	Chilean	Singapore	1 Michelin star	2024	—	—	
Katell Guillou	Guillou Campagne	French	Luxembourg – Schouweiler	1 Michelin star	2015	—	—	
Katell Guillou	Toit pour Toi	French	Luxembourg – Schouweiler	—	2006	—	—	
Skye Gyngell	Petersham Nurseries Cafe	Modern	United Kingdom – London	Closed	2010	—	—	
Noëmie Haentjens‡	Rozewied	Dutch	Netherlands – Kortgene	1 Michelin star	2026	—	—	
Rachel Haggstrom	The Restaurant at JUSTIN	Californian	United States – Paso Robles	1 Michelin star	2022	—	—	
Elizabeth Haigh	Pidgin	Asian Fusion	United Kingdom – London	—	2017	—	—	
Sarah Hallman	hallmann & klee	Modern	Germany – Berlin	1 Michelin star	2024	—	—	
Angela Hartnett	Angela Hartnett at The Connaught	Italian	United Kingdom – London	Closed	2004	—	—	
Angela Hartnett	Murano	Italian	United Kingdom – London	1 Michelin star	2009	—	—	
Zineb Hattab	Kle	Vegan	Switzerland – Zurich	Closed	2022	—	—	
Catherine Healy	Dunderry Lodge	Irish	Ireland – Navan	Closed	1986	—	—	
Sarah Henke	Spices	Asian Fusion	Germany – Sylt	Closed	2013	—	—	
Alejandra Herrador‡	Atalaya	Spanish	Spain – Alcossebre	1 Michelin star	2022	—	—	
Georgianna Hiliadaki†	Funky Gourmet	Greek	Greece – Athens	Closed	2012	2014	—	
Saki Hoshino‡	NAWA	Thai	Thailand – Bangkok	1 Michelin star	2024	—	—	
Rachel Humphrey†	Le Gavroche	French	United Kingdom – London	Closed	—	2007	—	
Julie Hyde	Restaurant 20 Victoria (Note: Hyde left the position as head chef at 20 Victoria in December 2025.)	Contemporary	Canada – Toronto	—	2023	—	—	
Patti Jackson	Delaware & Hudson	American	United States – New York City	Closed	2015	—	—	
Celia Jiménez	El Lago	Spanish	Spain – Marbella	Closed	2005	—	—	
Iris Jordán	Ansils	Contemporary	Spain – Anciles	1 Michelin star	2025	—	—	
Zeng-Huai Jun	Song	Sichuan	China – Guangzhou	1 Michelin star	2021	—	—	
Dalad Kambhu	Kin Dee	Thai	Germany – Berlin	—	2019	—	—	
Pilaipon Kamnag	Saneh Jaan	Thai	Thailand – Bangkok	1 Michelin star	2018	—	—	
Chiho Kanzaki‡ (Note: Kanzaki departed the restaurant in 2021. It has retained its Michelin star with the successor chef.)	Virtus	French	France – Paris	—	2019	—	—	
Karen Keygnaert	Restaurant A'Qi	Asian Fusion	Belgium – Bruges	Closed	2012	—	—	
Beverly Kim‡	Parachute	Korean	United States – Chicago	Closed	2016	—	—	
Bo-mi Kim‡	Mitou	Japanese	South Korea – Seoul	2 Michelin stars	2021	2024	—	
Hee-Eun Kim	Soul	Contemporary	South Korea – Seoul	1 Michelin star	2023	—	—	
Chizuko Kimura	Sushi Shunei	Japanese	France – Paris	1 Michelin star	2025	—	—	
Ida Kleijnen	De Lindenhorst	Dutch	Netherlands – Valkenburg aan de Geul	Closed	1983	—	—	
Anita Klemensen	Den Røde Cottage	Nordic	Denmark – Copenhagen	Closed	2011	—	—	
Antonia Klugmann	L'Argine a Vencò	Italian	Italy – Dolegna del Collio	1 Michelin star	2015	—	—	
Julia Komp	Schloss Loersfeld	German	Germany – Kerpen	—	2016	—	—	
Julia Komp	Sahila	Modern	Germany – Cologne	1 Michelin star	2023	—	—	
Nicole Krasinski‡	State Bird Provisions	Californian	United States – San Francisco	1 Michelin star	2014	—	—	
Nicole Krasinski‡	The Progress	Californian	United States – San Francisco	1 Michelin star	2017	—	—	
Genie Kwon‡	Kasama	Filipino	United States – Chicago	2 Michelin stars	2022	2025	—	
Camille Larquemin	Irwin	Modern	France – Paris	1 Michelin star	2026	—	—	
Vicky Lau	Tate	Modern	Hong Kong	2 Michelin stars	2013	2021	—	
Karina Laval‡	Le Château de Vault-de-Lugny	Japanese	France – Vault-de-Lugny	1 Michelin star	2019	—	—	
Nathalie Leblond	Les Deux	French	Germany – Munich	1 Michelin star	2023	—	—	
Stéphanie Le Quellec	La Scẻne	French	France – Paris	2 Michelin stars	2014	2019	—	
Justine Li	Fleur De Sel	French	Taiwan – Taichung	1 Michelin star	2020	—	—	
Kristina Liedags-Compton (Note: As of 2025, Liedags-Compton no longer identifies as a woman.)	Hilda and Jesse	American	United States – San Francisco	1 Michelin star	2024	—	—	
Kwen Liew‡	Pertinence	French	France – Paris	1 Michelin star	2018	—	—	
Liya Lin‡	Terrapin Creek	Californian	United States – Bodega Bay	—	2012	—	—	
Léa Linster	Restaurant Léa Linster	French	Luxembourg – Frisange	1 Michelin star	1987	—	—	
Norma Listman‡	Masala y Maíz	Fusion	Mexico – Mexico City	1 Michelin star	2025	—	—	
Anita Lo	Annisa	Asian Fusion	United States – New York City	Closed	2006	—	—	
Karime López‡	Gucci Osteria	Italian	Italy – Florence	1 Michelin star	2020	—	—	
Anika Madsen	Iris	Modern	Norway – Rosendal	1 Michelin star	2024	—	—	
Rika Maezawa	Nanakusa	Japanese	Japan – Tokyo	—	2020	—	—	
Anne Majourel	La Coquerie	French	France – Sète	—	2015	—	—	
Luisa Marelli Valazza	Al Sorriso	Italian	Italy – Soriso	1 Michelin star	1982	1989	1998	
Maria Marte	El Club Allard (Note: Marte originally joined the restaurant as a co-executive chef, alongside Diego Guerrero. Following Guerrero's departure in 2014, Marte retained the restaurant's stars as the sole chef.)	Spanish	Spain – Madrid	Closed	2007	2012	—	
Michiyo Matsumoto	Hokkoriya	Japanese	Japan – Kyoto	—	2010	—	—	
Aurora Mazzucchelli	Casa Mazzucchelli	Modern	Italy – Sasso Marconi	1 Michelin star	2024	—	—	
Lorna McNee	Cail Bruich	Scottish	United Kingdom – Glasgow	1 Michelin star	2021	—	—	
Alina Meissner-Bebrout	bi:braud	Contemporary	Germany – Ulm	1 Michelin star	2023	—	—	
Tatiana Mora‡	Mita	Latin American	United States – Washington D.C.	1 Michelin star	2024	—	—	
Françoise Mutel	La Maison Dans le Parc (Note: Mutel departed the restaurant in 2019. It has retained its Michelin star with the successor chef.)	French	France – Nancy	—	2014	—	—	
Carrie Nahabedian	NAHA	Mediterranean	United States – Chicago	Closed	2011	—	—	
Akemi Nakamura	Nishitemma Nakamura	Japanese	Japan – Osaka	1 Michelin star	2018	—	—	
Niki Nakayama	n/naka	Japanese	United States – Los Angeles	1 Michelin star	2024	2019	—	
Tobey Nemeth‡	Edulis	Mediterranean	Canada – Toronto	1 Michelin star	2022	—	—	
Anh Bao Nguyen	Tầm Vị	Vietnamese	Vietnam – Hanoi	1 Michelin star	2023	—	—	
Yeong-hee Noh	Poom	Korean	South Korea – Seoul	—	2017	—	—	
Mori Nozomi	Mori Nozomi	Japanese	United States – Los Angeles	1 Michelin star	2025	—	—	
Nancy Oakes	Boulevard	Contemporary	United States – San Francisco	—	2007	—	—	
Tiffani Ortiz‡	The Catbird Seat	Contemporary	United States – Nashville	1 Michelin star	2025	—	—	
Cassandre Osterroth‡	Kebec Club Privé	Creative	Canada – Quebec City	1 Michelin star	2025	—	—	
Rosina Ostler	Alois	Modern	Germany – Munich	2 Michelin stars	—	2023	—	
Camille Pailleau‡	Rozó	French	France – Lille	2 Michelin stars	2019	2025	—	
Camilla Parkner	Basement	Swedish	Sweden – Gothenburg	Closed	2011	—	—	
Sara Peral‡	OSA	Modern	Spain – Madrid	1 Michelin star	2024	—	—	
Melissa Perello	Fifth Floor	American	United States – San Francisco	Closed	2007	—	—	
Melissa Perello	Frances	American	United States – San Francisco	—	2011	—	—	
Melissa Perello	Octavia	Californian	United States – San Francisco	—	2016	—	—	
Teresa Pert	Ortega	Seafood	New Zealand – Wellington	1 Michelin star	2026	—	—	
Anne-Sophie Pic	La Dame de Pic (Dubai)	French	United Arab Emirates – Dubai	1 Michelin star	2024	—	—	
Anne-Sophie Pic	La Dame de Pic (Le 1920)	French	France – Megève	Closed	2022	—	—	
Anne-Sophie Pic	La Dame de Pic (London)	French	United Kingdom – London	2 Michelin stars	2018	2020	—	
Anne-Sophie Pic	La Dame de Pic (Paris)	French	France – Paris	—	2013	—	—	
Anne-Sophie Pic	La Dame de Pic (Singapore)	French	Singapore	Closed	2022	—	—	
Anne-Sophie Pic	Maison Pic	French	France – Valence	3 Michelin stars	—	1997	2007	
Anne-Sophie Pic	Pic Beau-Rivage Palace	French	Switzerland – Lausanne	2 Michelin stars	—	2009	—	
Valeria Piccini	Caino	Tuscan	Italy – Montemerano	2 Michelin stars	1991	1999	—	
Anna Posey‡	Elske	Nordic	United States – Chicago	1 Michelin star	2018	—	—	
Kei Pilz	Shiro	Japanese	Ireland – Ahakista	Closed	1996	—	—	
Alice Power	The Black Swan (Note: The restaurant had a one star rating when Power became head chef in February 2024. She has retained the restaurant's star as of 2025.)	British	United Kingdom – Oldstead	1 Michelin star	2024	—	—	
Fina Puigdevall	Les Cols	Creative	Spain – Olot	2 Michelin stars	1990	2010	—	
Helena Puolakka†	La Tante Claire	French	United Kingdom – London	Closed	—	2001	—	
Anne Quatrano	Bacchanalia	American	United States – Atlanta	1 Michelin star	2023	—	—	
Titti Qvarnström	Bloom in the Park	Nordic	Sweden – Malmö	—	2015	—	—	
Kelly Rangama	La Faham	Réunionnaise	France – Paris	1 Michelin star	2020	—	—	
Iliana Regan	Elizabeth	Contemporary	United States – Chicago	Closed	2014	—	—	
Margo Reuten	Da Vinci	French	Netherlands – Maasbracht	1 Michelin star	1999	2009	—	
Fanny Rey	L'Auberge de Saint-Rémy	Modern	France – Saint-Rémy-de-Provence	2 Michelin stars	2017	2025	—	
Elena Reygadas	Rosetta	Mediterranean	Mexico – Mexico City	1 Michelin star	2024	—	—	
Nawal Rezagui	Alcôve	Modern	France – Vinay	1 Michelin star	2026	—	—	
Helena Rizzo	Maní	Brazilian	Brazil – São Paulo	1 Michelin star	2015	—	—	
Missy Robbins	A Voce Columbus	Italian	United States – New York City	Closed	2007	—	—	
Missy Robbins	A Voce Madison	Italian	United States – New York City	Closed	2011	—	—	
Melissa Rodriguez	Al Coro	Italian	United States – New York City	Closed	—	2022	—	
Ruth Rogers‡	The River Café	Italian	United Kingdom – London	1 Michelin star	1998	—	—	
Ana Roš	Hiša Franko	Slovenian	Slovenia – Kobarid	3 Michelin stars	—	2020	2023	
Andrée Rosier	Les Rosiers	French	France – Biarritz	1 Michelin star	2009	—	—	
Marie Rougier-Salvat	La Tour des Vents (Note: Rougier-Salvat retired in 2015. The restaurant has retained its Michelin star with the successor chef.)	French	France – Bergerac	—	2010	—	—	
Emily Roux‡	Caractère	French	United Kingdom – London	1 Michelin star	2025	—	—	
Banyen Ruangsantheia	Suan Thip	Thai	Thailand – Pakkret	1 Michelin star	2019	—	—	
Carme Ruscalleda	Moments	Modern	Spain – Barcelona	2 Michelin stars	2011	2013	—	
Carme Ruscalleda	Sant Pau	Spanish	Spain – Sant Pol de Mar	Closed	1991	1996	2009	
Carme Ruscalleda	Sant Pau de Tòquio	Spanish	Japan – Tokyo	Closed	—	2008	—	
Mariya Russell	Kikko	Japanese	United States – Chicago	Closed	2020	—	—	
Daisy Ryan‡	Bell's	French	United States – Los Alamos	1 Michelin star	2021	—	—	
Nadia Sammut	Auberge la Feniẻre (Note: Nadia Sammut was named co-executive head chef of the restaurant in 2016 alongside her mother Reine Sammut, who already held a Michelin star for the establishment. The restaurant retained its Michelin star rating in the years following Nadia becoming head-chef.)	French	France – Lourmarin	Closed	2016	—	—	
Nadia Sammut	Le Goût du Bonheur	Modern	France – Cadenet	1 Michelin star	2018	—	—	
Reine Sammut	Auberge la Feniẻre	French	France – Lourmarin	Closed	1995	—	—	
Nadia Santini	Dal Pescatore	Italian	Italy – Canneto sull'Oglio	3 Michelin stars	1982	1988	1996	
Alanna Sapwell	Esmay	Australian	Australia – Adelaide	1 Michelin star	2026	—	—	
Bongkoch Satongun	Paste	Thai	Thailand – Bangkok	—	2018	—	—	
Sigi Schelling	Werneckhof Sigi Schelling	French	Germany – Munich	1 Michelin star	2022	—	—	
Alexandra Seelinger	Aquarello (Note: Seelinger departed the restaurant in 2013. It has retained its Michelin star with the successor chef.)	Italian	Germany – Munich	—	2000	—	—	
Julia Sedefdjian	Baieta	Mediterranean	France – Paris	1 Michelin star	2019	—	—	
Anna Sgroi	Restaurant Anna Sgroi	Italian	Germany – Hamburg	Closed	2013	—	—	
Orianne Shapira	Shmoné	Israeli	United States – New York City	1 Michelin star	2025	—	—	
Amanda Shulman	Her Place Supper Club	French	United States – Philadelphia	1 Michelin star	2025	—	—	
Malyna Si	Capa	Spanish	United States – Orlando	1 Michelin star	2022	—	—	
Nancy Silverton	Osteria Mozza	Italian	United States – Los Angeles	1 Michelin star	2009	—	—	
Clare Smyth	CORE by Clare Smyth	British	United Kingdom – London	3 Michelin stars	—	2019	2021	
Clare Smyth	Corenucopia	British	United Kingdom – London	1 Michelin star	2026	—	—	
Clare Smyth	Restaurant Gordon Ramsay (Note: Smyth was promoted to head chef of Restaurant Gordon Ramsay in 2006; and retained its three Michelin star rating. She left the position in 2016.)	French	United Kingdom – London	—	—	—	2006	
Beata Śniechowska	BABA	Polish	Poland – Wrocław	1 Michelin star	2026	—	—	
Pichaya Soontornyanakij	Potong	Asian Fusion	Thailand – Bangkok	1 Michelin star	2023	—	—	
Verena Stattmann	Austria Stuben	Contemporary	Austria – Obergurgl	1 Michelin star	2025	—	—	
Sabrina Stravato	Unforgettable	Italian	Italy – Turin	1 Michelin star	2025	—	—	
Douce Steiner	Hirschen	German	Germany – Sulzburg	2 Michelin stars	2008	2012	—	
Ada Stifani	Ada	Creative	Italy – Perugia	1 Michelin star	2024	—	—	
Ulrike Stoebe	Landhaus Mühlenberg	French	Germany – Zemmer	Closed	2011	—	—	
Roberta Sudbrack	Roberta Sudbrack	Brazilian	Brazil – Rio de Janeiro	Closed	2015	—	—	
Ayumi Sugiyama	Accents Table Bourse	French	France – Paris	1 Michelin star	2019	—	—	
DeAille Tam	Obscura	Modern	China – Shanghai	1 Michelin star	2022	—	—	
Zeynep Pinar Tasdemir	Araka	Turkish	Turkey – Istanbul	1 Michelin star	2023	—	—	
Pim Techamuanvivit	Kin Khao	Thai	United States – San Francisco	1 Michelin star	2016	—	—	
Pim Techamuanvivit	Nahm (Note: Techamuanvivit took over as executive chef of Nahm in 2019; and retained its Michelin star rating.)	Thai	Thailand – Bangkok	1 Michelin star	2019	—	—	
Pim Techamuanvivit	Nari	Thai	United States – San Francisco	1 Michelin star	2023	—	—	
Mi-Ra Thuillant	L'Essentiel	Modern	France – Deauville	1 Michelin star	2018	—	—	
Sam Tran	Gia	Vietnamese	Vietnam – Hanoi	1 Michelin star	2023	—	—	
Jessica Trindade‡	Madame Olympe	French	Brazil – Rio de Janeiro	1 Michelin star	2026	—	—	
Rosa Tschudi	Gian Grossi	Swiss	Switzerland – Zurich	Closed	1995	—	—	
Rosa Tschudi	Tschudi	French	Switzerland – Zurich	Closed	1981	—	—	
Aiko Uchigoshi	Aburi Hana (Note: Uchigoshi was promoted from pastry chef to executive chef of Aburi Hana in September 2026; while it already held one Michelin star.)	Japanese	Canada – Toronto	1 Michelin star	2026	—	—	
Karen Urie-Shields‡	Smyth	Contemporary	United States – Chicago	3 Michelin stars	2017	2018	2023	
Claire Vallée	ONA	Vegan	France – Arès	Closed	2021	—	—	
Georgiana Viou	Rouge	French	France – Nîmes	1 Michelin star	2023	—	—	
Michèle Visciano	Michel - Brasserie des Catalans	French	France – Marseille	—	2015	—	—	
Marianna Vitale	Sud	Modern	Italy – Quarto	Closed	2012	—	—	
Kanako Wakimoto	Sorahana	Japanese	Japan – Tokyo	1 Michelin star	2022	—	—	
Alice Waters	Chez Panisse	Californian	United States – Berkeley	—	2007	—	—	
Sue Zemanick	Zasu	American	United States – New Orleans	1 Michelin star	2025	—	—	

== See also ==
- List of chefs
- List of Michelin 3-star restaurants
- Lists of restaurants
