= Schleswig-Holstein Gourmet Festival =

Culinary festival held in Schleswig-Holstein, Germany

The Schleswig-Holstein Gourmet Festival (SHGF) is a culinary festival series founded in 1987 and organized by the Gastliches Wikingland e. V. (English: Hospitable Viking Land Association). The SHGF, based in Schleswig-Holstein, starts in September of one year and ends in March of the following year.

== The festival ==
The festival is attended by up to 3000 guests, depending on the number of member companies and thus events. Each event takes place in a member company, usually a hotel or restaurant, in which a guest chef is responsible for the evening's menu with the support of the hotel's kitchen team. The guest chefs vary per season. The focus of the festival is on regional and seasonal cuisine with the involvement of Schleswig-Holstein products.

== History ==
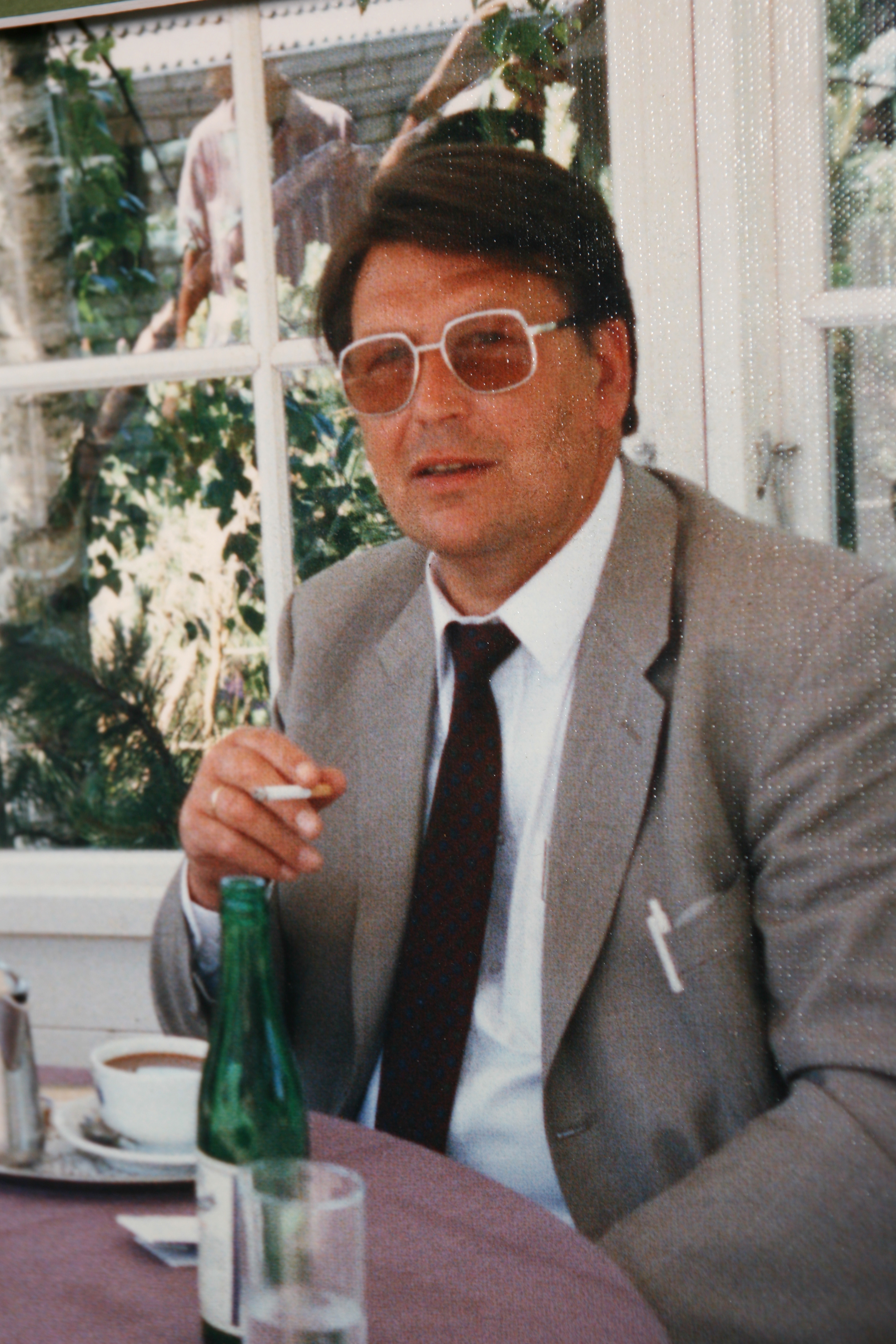
Hans Hansen-Mörck, 1986

The organizing company, Gastliches Wikingland e.V., was founded in 1987 by restaurateur Hans Hansen-Mörck (1933–1994) and eleven other hoteliers and restaurateurs in the Schleswig-Flensburg district who served guests at the Schleswig-Holstein Musik Festival, with the aim of holding a gourmet festival in the area. The 1st Schleswig-Holstein Gourmet Festival took place at the Historischen Krug in Oeversee. During the festival, Hansen-Mörck published a cookbook. The Presidents of Gastliches Wikingland have been Hansen-Mörck, Franz-Dieter Weiß, Heta Behmer, and since 1991 Klaus-Peter Willhöft.

In 2020, 16 companies from all parts of the state were part of the cooperation, including the founding members Ringhotel Waldschlösschen of Schleswig and, since 2020, Hotel Wassersleben from Harrislee. In 1987, the Michelin Guide awarded more than seven companies in Schleswig-Holstein eight Michelin stars in total. In 2020, the Michelin Guide in Schleswig-Holstein awarded three restaurants with two stars and nine with one star.

In 2000, the “Tour de Gourmet Jeunesse” was introduced as part of the Schleswig-Holstein Gourmet Festival. The target group event is aimed at young gourmets between 18 and 35 years of age. The routes for communicative restaurant hopping change annually and lead to two or three member houses. In the 29th season, the "Tour de Gourmet Solitaire" was introduced. It was a new concept for the large target group of single travelers over 40 years of age. Here, too, the routes to three member companies change seasonally. The opening gala of the festival is a little different from the regular events. Internationally trend-setting top chefs work together with chefs from their own member companies to turn the 5-course menu including a dinner party into a culinary experience.

== Guest chefs ==
For the 34th SHGF in 2020 and 2021, 18 guest chefs from Germany, Denmark, France and Switzerland will be at the stoves of 16 member companies. The guest chef changes every season - from established and new chefs.

The guest chefs who have performed at the Schleswig-Holstein Gourmet Festival so far include:

- Jacqueline Amirfallah
- Henri Bach
- Wolfgang Becker
- Boris Benecke
- Ingo Bockler
- Jean-Claude Bourgueil
- Denis Feix
- Rolf Fliegauf
- Sebastian Frank (Koch)
- Tommy Fries
- Maria Groß
- Nils Henkel
- Sarah Henke
- Kenneth Toft-Hansen
- Dirk Hoberg
- Jens Jakob
- Thomas Kammeier
- Michael Kempf
- Johannes King
- Kolja Kleeberg
- Manuel Liepert
- Christian Lohse
- Thomas Martin
- Anna Matscher
- Peter Madsen
- Thomas Merkle
- René Mammen
- Marco Müller
- Nelson Müller
- Hendrik Otto
- Cornelia Poletto
- Michael Röhm
- Stefan Rottner
- Christoph Rüffer
- Jörg Sackmann
- Peter Scharff (Koch)
- Thorsten Schmidt
- Achim Schwekendiek
- Ronny Siewert
- Patrick Spies
- Diethard Urbansky
- Joachim Wissler
- Harald Wohlfahrt from the Schwarzwaldstube restaurant at Hotel Traube in Baiersbronn-Tonbach, guest chef in the Orangerie in the Maritim Seehotel on Timmendorfer Strand since 1990
- Tristan Brandt
- Philipp Heid
- Tony Hohlfeld
- David Görne
- Rainer Gassner
- Philipp Stein
- Sonja Frühsammer
- Jens Rittmeyer
- Ralf Jakumeit
- Michael Hoffmann
- Titti Qvarnström
- Julia Komp
- Daniel Gottschlich
- Benedikt Faust
- Kirill Kinfelt

== Reception ==
German news broadcaster n-tv said in 2011 that the Gourmet Festival turned the northernmost federal state into "a holiday destination for gourmets". In 2005, Die Zeit said it brought "fresh air to north German cuisine," which n-tv described as "heavy, fat, and unimaginative," as far as Schleswig-Holstein cuisine was concerned.

== Literature ==
- 1st Schleswig-Holstein Gourmet Festival. Verl. Gastl. Wikingland. 1987.
- Schleswig-Holstein isst lecker (1. ed.). Wachholtz. 2006. ISBN 978-3-529-05522-5.
