= Marelli (surname) =

Marelli is a surname. Notable people with the surname include:

- Aldo Marelli (1919–2010), Italian professional football player
- Ercole Marelli (1867–1922), Italian engineer and entrepreneur
- Giovanni Tommaso Maria Marelli (1673–1752), Roman Catholic prelate
- Luigi Maria Marelli (1858–1936), Italian prelate
- Luisa Marelli Valazza (born 1950), Italian chef
- Marco Arturo Marelli (born 1949), Swiss set designer and stage director
- Michele Marelli (born 1978), Italian clarinet and basset horn soloist
- Sergio Marelli (1926–2006), Italian basketball player
