= La mère Bourgeois =

Restaurant in Priay, Ain, France

Coordinates: 46.0037°N 5.2903°E

La mère Bourgeois is a former restaurant in Priay, Ain, France, located 85 Grande rue de la Côtière. The restaurant was established in 1923 and was awarded the prestigious 3 Michelin stars under chef Marie Bourgeois between 1933 and 1937.

The restaurant was closed in 2010, and has been falling into ruin since this time.

== See also ==
- List of Michelin starred restaurants
