= The Herbfarm =

American restaurant in Washington

Coordinates: 47°43′59″N 122°08′50″W

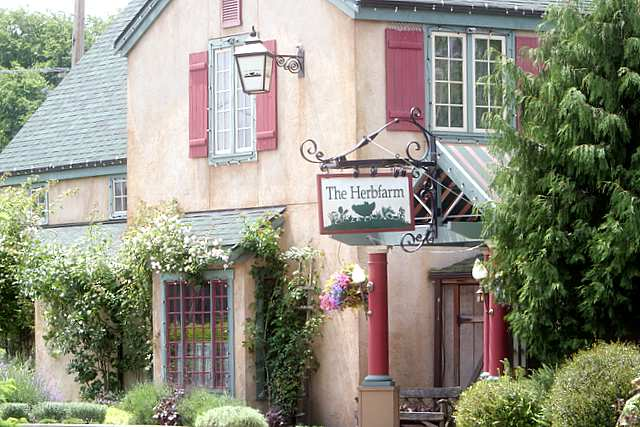
The Herbfarm

The Herbfarm is an American restaurant serving Pacific Northwest cuisine and an early practitioner of local food. This is a philosophy that promotes the growing, enjoyment, and consumption of foods from a limited region.

The Herbfarm is located outside Seattle, Washington, in the city of Woodinville. It was one of the first modern restaurants in America to focus solely on preparing regional foods from local sources. Other well-known practitioners include Alice Waters' Chez Panisse in Berkeley, California, the Sooke Harbour House in British Columbia, and Odessa Piper's L'Etoile in Madison, Wisconsin. Like those restaurants, it is a member of Slow Food, an international movement to preserve artisanal food.

The Herbfarm began not as a restaurant but as an herbal nursery in 1974. In 1986, Ron Zimmerman joined the establishment along with his wife, Carrie Van Dyck. That year they converted a farm garage into a small restaurant and named it The Herbfarm.

In January 1997, a fire destroyed the restaurant. Difficulties in securing building permits caused Zimmerman and Van Dyck to move in 1999 to the Hedges Wine Cellars in Issaquah, Washington. The Herbfarm opened in current Woodinville quarters in 2001.

Jerry Traunfeld, winner of the 2000 James Beard Award for "Best American Chef: Northwest and Hawaii" was the executive chef from July 1990 to November 2007. He is the author of The Herbfarm Cookbook and The Herbal Kitchen: Cooking with Fragrance and Flavor. Traunfeld has appeared on Martha Stewart Living, Better Homes and Gardens, The Splendid Table, and other American television and radio programs.

As of 2018, Chris Weber was the youngest chef, of any of America's 47 5-Diamond restaurants.

== Recognition ==
- In 2012, The Herbfarm was listed as #33 on Opinionated About Dining's list of the Top 100 US Restaurants
- In 2005, The Herbfarm was honored as "Restaurant of the Year" at the third annual Washington Wine Restaurant Awards.
- In 2005 it was awarded first place in Restaurant Hospitality's 16th Annual Best Wine Lists in America Competition.
- In 2002, and every year since, The Herbfarm earned the AAA Five Diamond award (Highest Rating: 1 of 49 in America).
