= Douce Steiner =

German chef (born 1971)

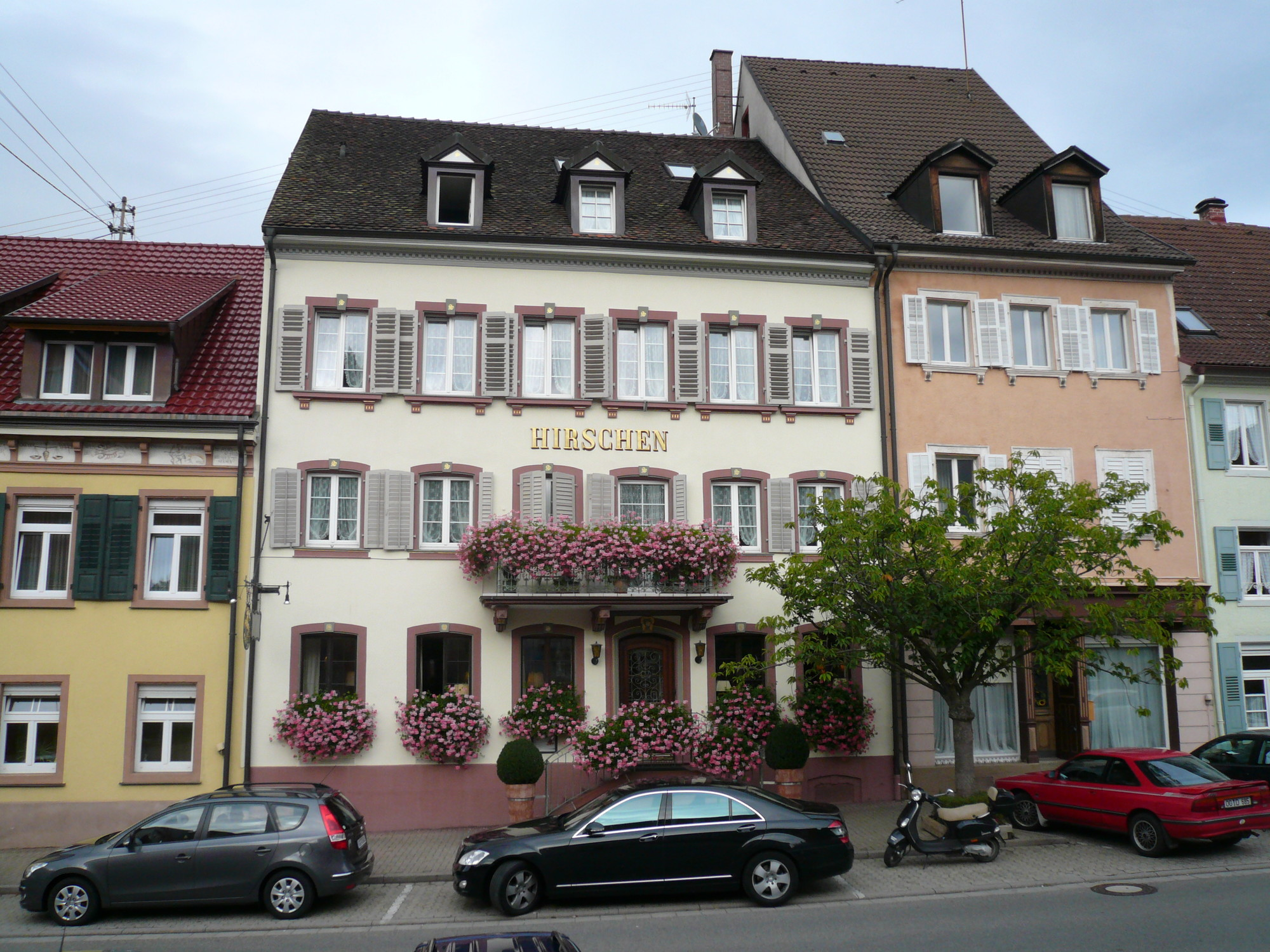
Hirschen Restaurant in Sulzburg

Douce Steiner (born 1971) is a German chef. She holds two Michelin stars since 2012.

Steiner grew up in her parents' hotel and restaurant "Hirschen" in the small town Sulzburg in South-Western Germany, which is looking back at a tradition of 500 years. After training as a chef in her fathers' business, she continued her professional training with renowned and highly decorated chefs such as Georges Blanc, Fritz Schilling and Harald Wohlfahrt. During her time at Wohlfahrt's Schwarzwaldstube restaurant in Baiersbronn, she met her husband Udo Weiler, whom she married in 1997.

Together with her husband, Steiner returned to the family business in Sulzburg in 1998 and both joined Steiner's father in the kitchen. The Hirschen restaurant had been awarded with two Michelin stars in 1995. Douce Steiner finally took over from her father in 2008, which at first resulted in the loss of one of the Michelin stars. In 2012, the Hirschen restaurant was again awarded a second Michelin star. Steiner ranks among the highest decorated female chefs in Germany and is the only female chef to hold two Michelin stars.

== Publications ==
- Cuisine Douce. Sterneküche für zuhause, AT Verlag, Baden 2008, ISBN 978-3-03-800402-8.
- Meine leichte Küche. Cuisine Douce, AT Verlag, Aarau 2011, ISBN 978-3-03800-521-6.
- Meine liebsten Desserts. Cuisine Douce, AT Verlag, Aarau and Munich 2013, ISBN 978-3-03800-722-7.
- Douce. Unsere verrückte Gemüsewelt, Freiburg 2014, ISBN 978-3-9815555-3-0.
