= State bird =

A state bird is the insignia of a nation or a state (sub-national entity).

For lists of these animals, see:

- List of national birds, national birds on country level
- List of Australian bird emblems, for the Australian states
- List of Indian state birds, for the Indian states
- List of U.S. state birds, for the U.S. states

"State bird" may also refer to:

- State Bird Provisions, a restaurant in San Francisco, California.

== See also ==
- List of national animals, for a list of other animals per country
- List of animals representing first-level administrative country subdivisions, for a list of animals on the sub-country level
