= Eving =

- Borough of Dortmund
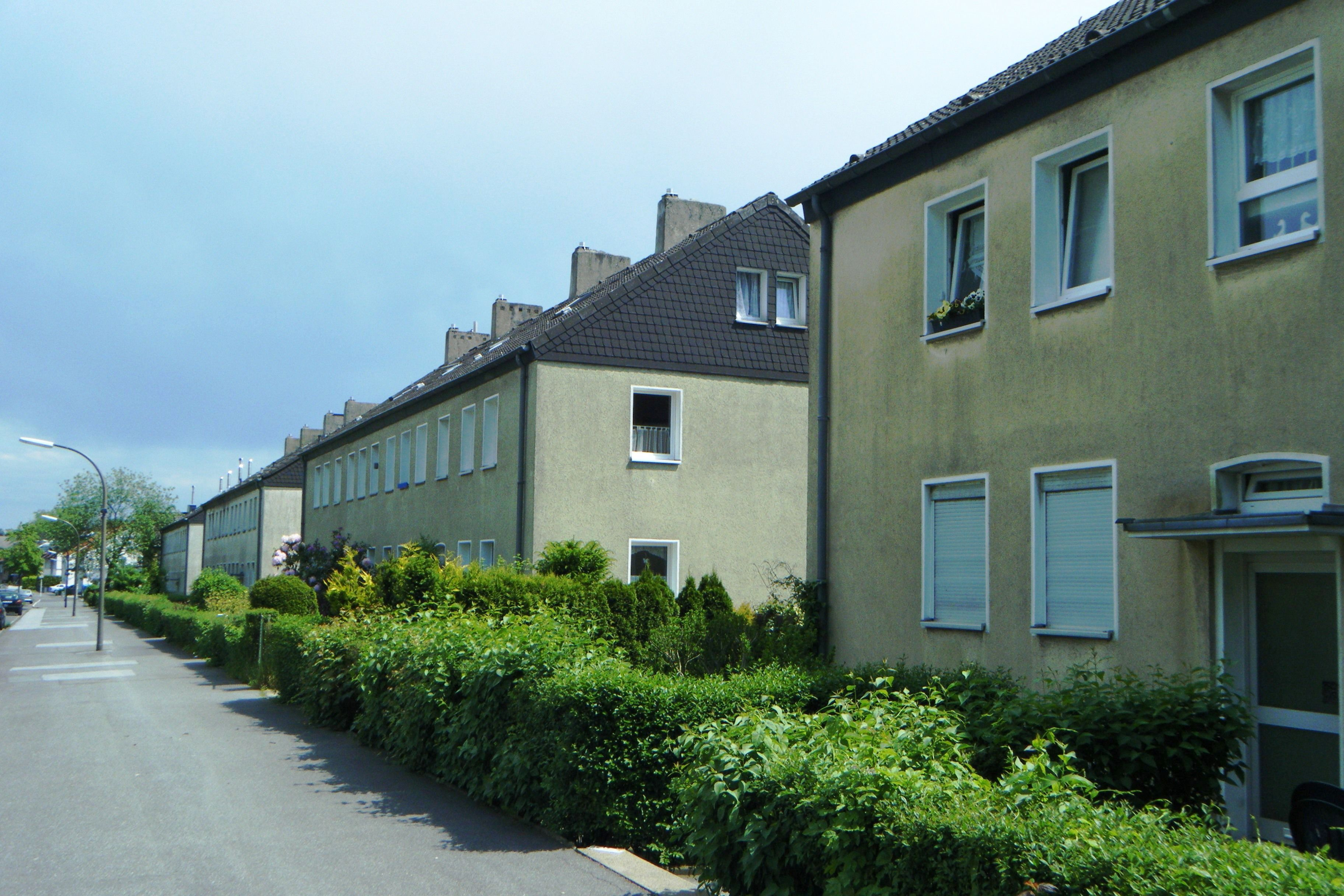
- Typical row of houses

- Location within Dortmund
- Interactive map of Eving
- Location within Germany Location within North Rhine-Westphalia
- Coordinates: 51.5528°N 7.4744°E
- Country: Germany
- State: North Rhine-Westphalia
- City: Dortmund

Area
  - Total: 22.89 km^{2} (8.84 sq mi)
- Elevation: 93 m (305 ft)

Population (2020-12-31)
  - Total: 38,687
  - Density: 1,690/km^{2} (4,377/sq mi)
- Time zone: UTC+01:00 (CET)
  - Summer (DST): UTC+02:00 (CEST)
- Dialling codes: 0231

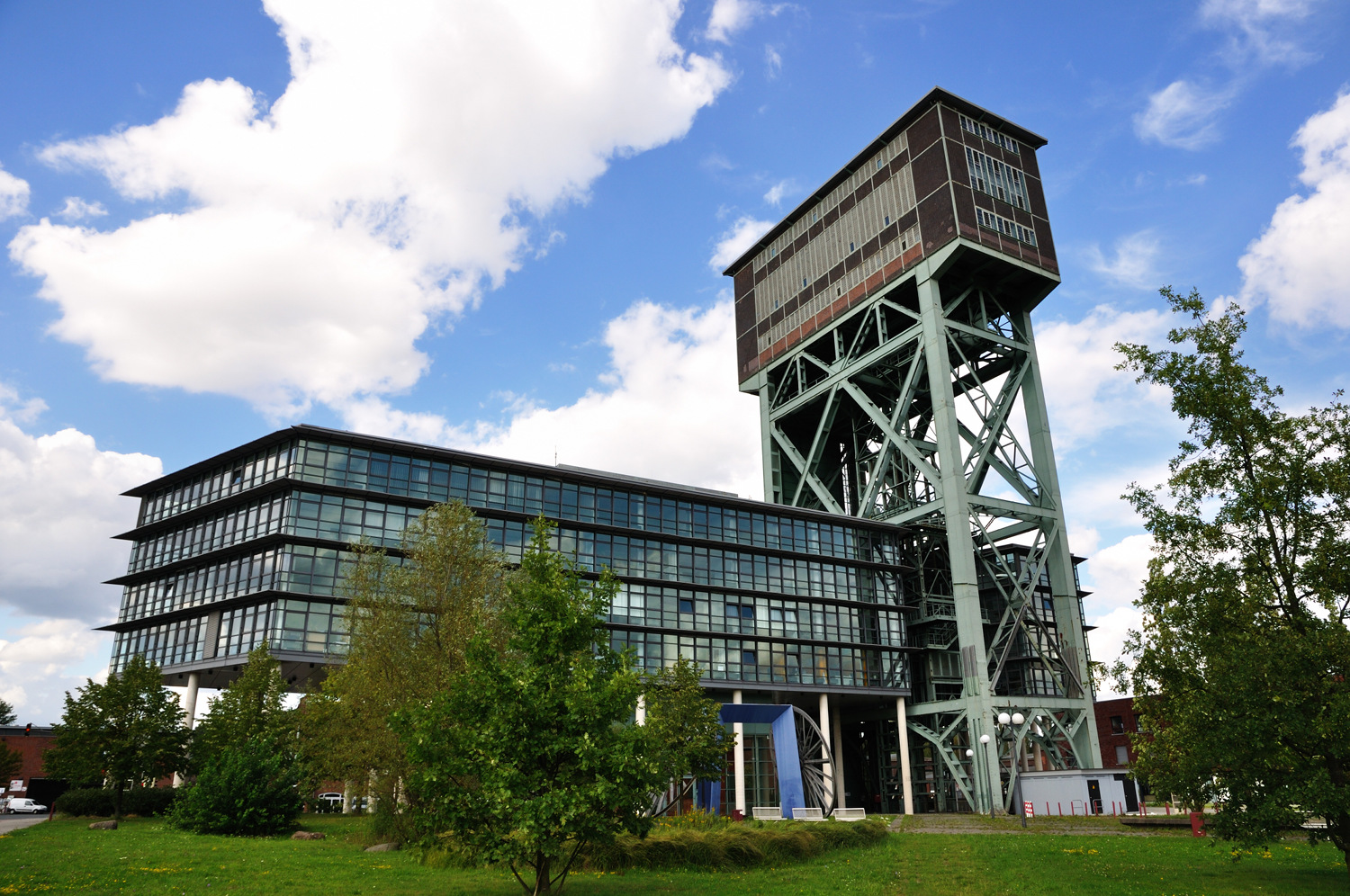
Zeche Minister Stein

Eving (German pronunciation: [ˈeːvɪŋ]) is a Stadtteil (quarter) in the eponymous Stadtbezirk ("city borough") in the north of the city of Dortmund, Germany. It was incorporated into Dortmund in 1914.

With a population of about 20,000 Eving is one of the most populated parts of Dortmund. The population of the Stadtbezirk, which also includes Brechten, Holthausen, Lindenhorst and Kemminghausen, is about 36,000.

Eving's unemployment rate is high and the average income is low compared to the city's average, which makes it one of Dortmund's socially disadvantaged areas.

== History ==
Eving was first mentioned before and around 1220 as Evenecke in the bailiwick rolls of Essen Abbey. The place was variously called 1287 Evenike, 1302 Euenic, 1303 Euenecke or 1305 Evenich.

The Stadtteil is famous for its history of coal mining and the football club TuS Eving-Lindenhorst, for whom Michael Zorc, Stefan Klos and Lars Ricken have played during their childhood and youth. The Zeche Minister Stein was the last active coal mine in Dortmund. It was in use until 1987.
