= Fanny Rey =

French chef

- Born: Bourgogne, France
- Culinary career
- Rating: Michelin stars
- Current restaurant: L'Auberge de Saint-Rémy-de-Provence
- Television show: Top Chef (France)

Fanny Rey is a French chef. She is best known from the public audience as the finalist of the second season of the cooking contest Top Chef broadcast on M6 in 2011.

The restaurant L'Auberge de Saint-Rémy-de-Provence where she is the chef obtained its first Michelin star in 2017 and a second one in 2025, which makes of her one of the rare starred female chefs in France.

== Life and career ==
Fanny Rey was born and raised in the region of Bourgogne and discovered cooking by making crêpes. At age 15, she went to the department of Jura to start a CAP in a hotel school.

She began here career with Nicolas Le Bec at the restaurant Fermes de Marie in Megève, Haute-Savoie. She then worked at the Bastide de Marie in Ménerbes, Vaucluse, before engaging herself in the French Navy in Brest. She spent six month at the marine firefighters in Marseille then returned to her career in cooking.

In 2011, she participated at the second season of Top Chef broadcast on M6 where she ended finalist.

In 2012, she opened her first restaurant with Jonathan Wahid by taking over the restaurant L'Auberge de la Reine Jeanne in Saint-Rémy-de-Provence, Bouches-du-Rhône. The restaurant was renamed L'Auberge de Saint-Rémy-de-Provence.

In 2017, the Michelin guide gave one star at her restaurant and elected her "Female Chef of the Year". She is the first woman to obtain a new star that year.

During the 2019–2020 season, she took over the kitchens of the 5-starred hotel La Sivolière in Courchevel. In June 2020, she participated with several starred chefs at the operation À table, les soignants !. The objective was to offer to members of the hospital staff, who were strongly solicited during the COVID-19 pandemic, a gastronomic dinner in one of the partner restaurants.

Her restaurant L'Auberge de Saint-Rémy-de-Provence received a second Michelin star in March 2025.

== See also ==
- List of female chefs with Michelin stars
