= Dalad Kambhu =

Thai-American chef (born 1986)

Dalad Kambhu (born 1986) is a Thai-American chef. In 2019, Kambhu earned a Michelin star for her restaurant Kin Dee, in Berlin. In 2023, Kambhu and Kin Dee were named number 70 in the top 100 restaurants in Germany.

== Biography ==
Kambhu was born in Austin, Texas and grew up in Bangkok. Kambhu moved to New York in the early 2000s to become a model and to study fashion and international commerce. There, she was introduced to different flavors and cuisine, inspiring her to become a chef. Kambhu began cooking for friends in New York, sharing Thai flavors that she grew up with. Kambhu is self taught.

In 2015, Kambhu moved to Berlin. In 2017, Kambhu opened Kin Dee in Berlin. Kin Dee focused on authentic Thai cuisine using local produce from regional producers. The restaurant prioritized sustainability through seasonal menus using ethically caught seafood. In 2019, Kin Dee was awarded its first Michelin star.

Kin Dee lost its Michelin star in 2023. That year, the restaurant was named number 70 of the top restaurants in Germany.

In July 2024, at age 38, Kambhu closed Kin Dee. Kambhu cited stress and burnout for the decision to close, describing how the managing business had negatively affected her health.

== See also ==
- List of female chefs with Michelin stars
