= Kwen Liew =

Malaysian chef

- Born: Kuala Lumpur, Malaysia
- Occupation: Chef

Kwen Liew is a Malaysian chef of classic French cuisine in Paris, France.

== Early life ==
Liew was born in Kuala Lumpur and grew up in Malaysia.

== Education ==
Liew attended Le Cordon Bleu for cuisine courses in Australia and Thailand. Liew attended Ecole Nationale Supérieure de Pâtisserie in France to learn French pastry.

== Career ==
Liew started her career as an intern chef at Antoine in Paris, France. Liew became a chef at Le Saint Julien in Singapore. As a French cuisine chef, Liew has worked in top restaurants in Australia, Thailand, Singapore and France.

In March 2017, Liew opened Pertinence Restaurant with her partner Ryunosuke Naito in Paris, France. It serves classic French cuisine with Japanese technique. In 2018, Liew became the first Malaysian woman to win a Michelin star. Liew is one of the two female chefs out of 57 whom received a Michelin star in 2018. Liew is the co-owner of Pertinence Restaurant with her husband in Paris.

== Personal life ==
Liew's partner is Ryunosuke Naito, a chef.

== See also ==
- List of female chefs with Michelin stars
