= Chizuko Kimura =

Japanese sushi chef

Chizuko Kimura (born April 1970) is a Japanese sushi chef based in Paris. In 2025 she and her restaurant Sushi Shunei were awarded a Michelin star. With the award, she became the first female sushi chef in the world to win a Michelin star.

== Biography ==
Chizuko Kimura was born in Japan in April 1970, from a father businessman and a mother housewife. She has a sister. She grew up between Tokyo and Mount Fuji. She became a tourists guide and in 2004,she met in Paris Shunei Kimura, that had lived in France for around 30 years and became her husband in 2005. Chizuko Kimura settled in France in 2008. Her husband dreamed of having a restaurant and a Michelin start, but is diagnosed with a liver cancer in 2015.

=== Sushi restaurant ===
Kimura was working as a tour guide in Paris when her husband decided to open a sushi restaurant in Montmartre. On June 9, 2021, Chizuko Kimura's husband opened Sushi Shunei, a small restaurant of only eight to nine seats. During the COVID-19 pandemic, Kimura lost her job as a tour guide and joined her husband in the restaurant where she learned to prepare fish, cook rice and run the business. At the time, she had no experience as a chef.

In 2022, their small restaurant Sushi Shunei was awarded a Michelin star. Three months later, her husband, Sushi Shunei's head chef Shunei Kimura died of cancer. Before his death, Chizuko Kimura promised her husband she would maintain Sushi Shunei's legacy. The restaurant lost its Michelin star the following year. The loss of the Michelin star encouraged Kimura to continue to improve. She kept training and studying, and visit Japan regularly to keep improving. She also hired the sushi master Takeshi Morooka.

In March 2025, Chizuko Kimura and Sushi Shunei were awarded a Michelin star. In earning the award, Chizuko Kimura became the first woman in the 120-year history of the guide to be awarded a Michelin star for sushi.

== See also ==
- List of female chefs with Michelin stars
