= Fernand Gutierrez =

- Born: 1950; Dijon, France
- Died: July 14, 2006 (aged 55–56); Mexico City, Mexico
- Occupations: Chef, restaurateur
- Known for: Executive Chef of The Ritz-Carlton Chicago; mentorship of James Beard Award-winning chefs
- Spouse: Carole Gutierrez
- Children: 2

Fernand Gutierrez (1950 – July 14, 2006) was a French-American chef and restaurateur known for his tenure as executive chef at the Ritz-Carlton Chicago. A significant figure in the development of Chicago's fine-dining scene during the 1980s, he was featured on the PBS series Great Chefs of Chicago and served as the first president of the Vatel Club du Midwest. He is recognized for his mentorship of several James Beard Award-winning chefs and his role in advancing French culinary techniques in American restaurants.

== Early life ==
Born in Dijon, France, Gutierrez began a culinary apprenticeship at age 14 at the Hotel du Nord. In 1968, he worked in Grenoble during the 1968 Winter Olympics. He later held positions at the Hôtel de Paris Monte-Carlo in Monte Carlo and worked in the Bahamas before immigrating to the United States.

== Career ==
=== Ritz-Carlton Chicago ===
Gutierrez first joined the Ritz-Carlton Chicago in 1976. Following roles as executive chef at the Fairmont Hotel in Atlanta and a position in Houston, he returned to the Ritz-Carlton Chicago in 1983 as executive chef. Under his leadership, the hotel's "Dining Room" became noted for its classical French technique and emphasis on seasonal ingredients. In 1984, he was featured in the PBS television series Great Chefs of Chicago (Episode 5), demonstrating preparations including quail in an omelet pouch.

=== Culinary leadership ===
In 1986, Gutierrez became the first president of the Vatel Club du Midwest, an organization promoting French culinary traditions in the American Midwest. That same year, he competed in the Culinary Olympics in Frankfurt, West Germany, representing the United States.

=== Mentorship ===
Gutierrez was noted for promoting staff from entry-level positions into professional culinary roles. His mentorship influenced several prominent American chefs:

- Carrie Nahabedian, Michelin-starred chef and James Beard Award winner, who worked under Gutierrez at the Ritz-Carlton Chicago.
- Susan Weaver, who trained under Gutierrez at the Ritz-Carlton and placed seventh in the world cooking championship in Lyon, France in 1987. Gutierrez served as her sponsor and coach for the competition.
- Steven Chiappetti, James Beard "Rising Star" nominee, who trained under Gutierrez.
- Leonard Ventura, executive chef at several Chicago hospitality properties.

== Later years ==
In the 1990s, Gutierrez moved to Mexico City where he opened and operated Bistrot La Bourgogne, a traditional French bistro. He continued to operate the restaurant until his death from lung cancer on July 14, 2006. He was survived by his wife Carole and children Eric and Joanna.
