= Loffenau =

Town in southwestern Germany

- Municipality
- Coat of arms

- Location of Loffenau within Rastatt district
- Interactive map of Loffenau
- Location within Germany Location within Baden-Württemberg
- Coordinates: 48°46′21″N 08°23′08″E
- Country: Germany
- State: Baden-Württemberg
- Admin. region: Karlsruhe
- District: Rastatt

Government
  - Mayor (2017–25): Markus Burger

Area
  - Total: 17.07 km^{2} (6.59 sq mi)
- Elevation: 319 m (1,047 ft)

Population (2025-12-31)
  - Total: 2,492
  - Density: 146.0/km^{2} (378.1/sq mi)
- Time zone: UTC+01:00 (CET)
  - Summer (DST): UTC+02:00 (CEST)
- Postal codes: 76597
- Dialling codes: 07083
- Vehicle registration: RA
- Website: www.loffenau.de

Loffenau is a town in the district of Rastatt in Baden-Württemberg in Germany.

== Geography ==
Loffenau is located within a tributary valley of the Murg River in the western slopes of the northern Black Forest.

== History ==
Loffenau enjoys a rich history, spanning well over seven centuries.

== Demographics ==
Population development:

| Year | Inhabitants |
|---|---|
| 1990 | 2,617 |
| 2001 | 2,683 |
| 2011 | 2,531 |
| 2021 | 2,534 |

== Local attractions ==
A major point of interest in Loffenau is the Protestant Heilig Kreuz (Holy Cross) Church. The 550-year-old medieval church contains both well-preserved original and restored 19th-century frescos. Among various images of saints and apostles, visitors can admire the well known image of the 'Host Mill.' An easily accessible viewing platform is located within the church. Another major local attraction is the Teufelsmühle (Devil's Mill) which overlooks the town from a lofty altitude of 2979 ft (908m).

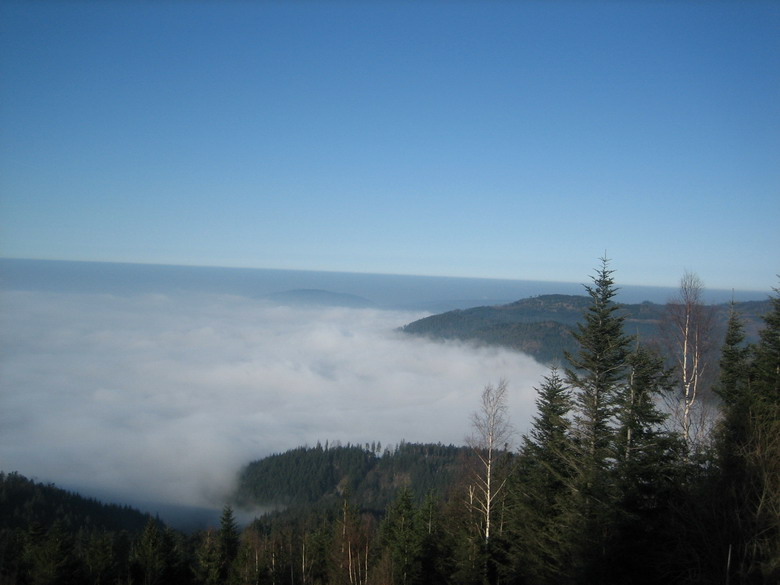
View Teufelsmühle above Loffenau into the Murgtal on a foggy day

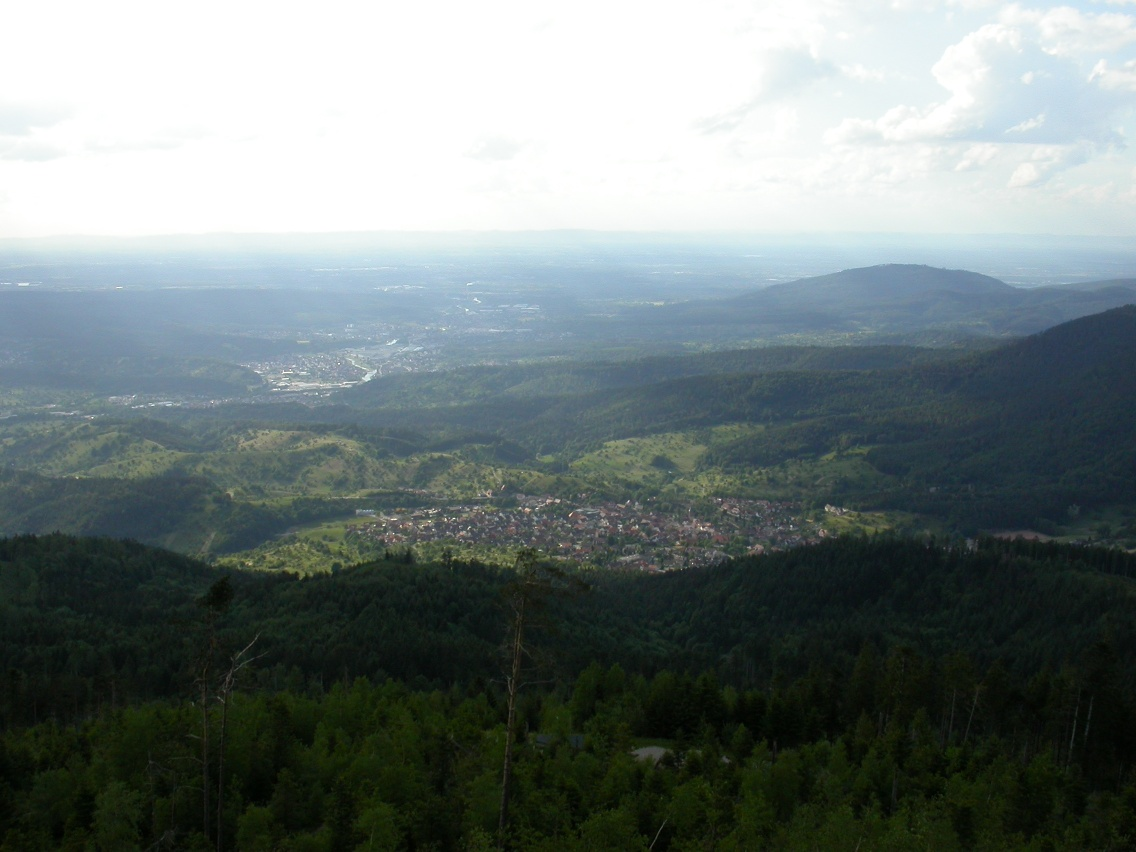
View Teufelsmühle above Loffenau into the Murgtal

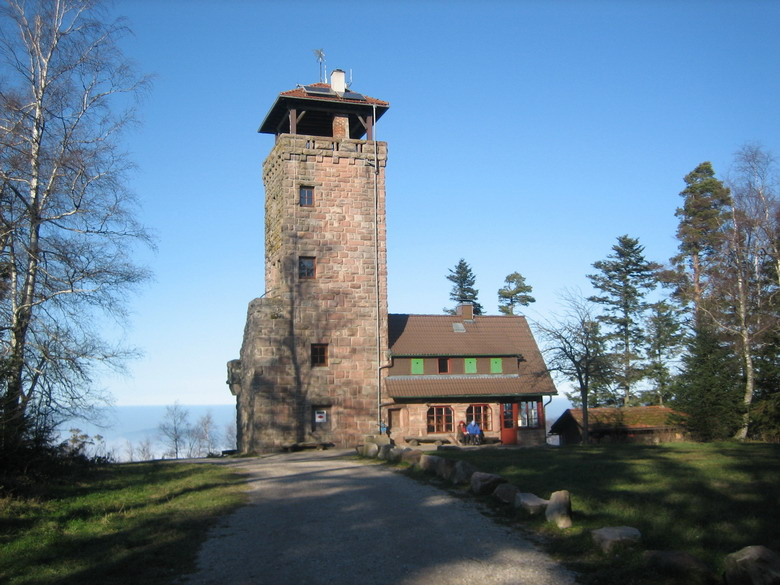
Tourist attraction Teufelsmühle

== Politics ==
The town is a member of the Association of Administrations of Cities. Gernsbach

=== Local government ===
The local government consists of twelve elected members and a mayor. (five FWG; four SPD; three CDU)

=== Twinning ===
The town is twinned with:

- Caderousse, Département Vaucluse, Region Provence-Alpes-Côte d'Azur, France since 1985
- Kreischa district Weißeritzkreis, Sachsen, Germany since 1990
- Montefelcino, Region Marche, Province Pesaro and Urbino, Italy since 1999
- Steinbourg, Department Bas-Rhin, Region Grand Est, France.

== Famous people ==
Chefs Günter Seeger (Michelin starred, Mobil 5 star in the United States) and Harald Wohlfahrt (Michelin starred) were born in Loffenau.

Meryl Streep's paternal ancestors lived in Loffenau, and one was elected mayor. Her great-great-grandfather Gottfried Streeb immigrated to the U.S. from Loffenau.
