= Ida Kleijnen =

Dutch chef (1936–2019)

- Born: 17 March 1936
- Died: 15 January 2019 (aged 82)
- Occupation: Chef

Ida Kleijnen (17 March 1936 – 15 January 2019) was a Dutch Michelin-starred chef.

== Life and career ==
Kleijnen was born on 17 March 1936. She was self-taught.

She worked at the Prinses Juliana before turning her guest house into a restaurant called De Lindenhorst. She won a Michelin star in 1983 which she held onto until 1994 when she handed the business over to her son, Paul.

In 1991, she was voted the best female chef in the Netherlands and between 1997 and 2010, she gave cooking lessons.

She died on 15 January 2019.
