= Adejoké Bakare =

Nigerian-born chef

- Born: Kaduna State
- Education: Kaduna State University
- Years active: 2019–current
- Culinary career
- Cooking style: West African
- Ratings
- Michelin Guide, 2024.
- Current restaurant
- Chishuru
- Awards
- Brixton Kitchen, Amateur category, 2019; Time Out magazine’s “Best London Restaurant”, 2022; 100 Most Influential Women in Hospitality, 2022; Chef of the Year, National Restaurant Awards 2024

Adejoké "Joké" Bakare is a British Nigerian-born chef specialising in West African cuisine. Largely self taught, in 2024, she became the first Black woman in the United Kingdom to be awarded a Michelin-star. Later that year, she was named Chef of the Year at the National Restaurant Awards.

== Biography ==
=== Early life ===
Bakare was born and grew up in Kaduna, Nigeria. She is of Igbo and Yoruba, heritage, with a Yoruba father and Igbo mother. She grew up in the northern part of Nigeria; which exposed her to a variety of cultural influences growing up. She states her inspiration as her paternal grandmother who made Yoruba street food. While studying biomedical sciences at [Ahamadu Bello University, Zaria, Kaduna state, she supported herself by running a fish-and-chips cart.

In 1999, she moved to the United Kingdom to study. While working in various fields including property management, Bakare continued her interest in and love of cooking. A self-taught chef, she operated a street food van outside her church, and later hosted supper clubs, sharing her interest in west African cuisine.

In 2019, her friends encouraged her to enter the Brixton Kitchen cooking competition, where the grand prize was a three month pop up shop in Brixton Village. To her surprise, Bakare won the competition in the amateur category.

=== Chishuru ===
In September 2020, Bakare opened Chishuru, a pop-up restaurant in Brixton, London specialising in modern West African cuisine. In 2022, Chishuru was named London's Best Restaurant by Time Out Magazine.

Chishuru would appear in several other popup locations across London, before outgrowing their Brixton site. In September 2023, Bakare and Chishuru settled in Fitzrovia. In November 2023, food critic Charlotte Ivers's positive review of Chishuru brought increased attention to the restaurant.

On 5 February 2024, Chishuru and head chef Bakare were awarded a Michelin-star. With the recognition, Bakare became the first black woman in the United Kingdom to become a Michelin-starred chef. She would become the second black woman in the world to be awarded a Michelin star after France's Georgiana Viou, who was awarded a Michelin star in 2023.

In June 2024, Bakare was named "Chef of the Year" at Time Out's National Restaurant Awards.

== See also ==
- List of female chefs with Michelin stars
