= Andrea Carlson (chef) =

Canadian chef and restaurateur

- Born: Vancouver, BC, Canada
- Education: Art Institute of Vancouver
- Occupations: chef, restaurateur

Andrea Carlson is a Canadian chef and restaurateur whose restaurant, Burdock & Co., was awarded a Michelin Star in October 2022. It is the first restaurant owned and operated by a female chef to receive a Michelin Star in Canada. Based in Vancouver, British Columbia, she is known for her practice of a 100 mile diet and incorporation of local, organic ingredients. Born in Vancouver, Carlson grew up in a household with two working parents. As a result, she was often left to fend for herself to create meals. Carlson purchased a New York Times cookbook at the age of 13, and was immediately interested in pursuing a career in the culinary arts. She attended the Dubrulle Culinary Arts School (now the Art Institute of Vancouver).

== Career ==
Carlson started her cooking career at Star Anise restaurant (now closed), as a garde manger. She followed her time at Star Anise working at other Vancouver area restaurants that included Raincity Grill, C Restaurant, and, on Vancouver Island, Sooke Harbour House. From 2007 to 2012, Carlson worked at Vancouver's Bishop's Restaurant, where she served as Executive Chef.

== Burdock & Co. / Harvest Community Foods / Bar Gobo ==
In 2012, Carlson opened Harvest Community Foods - a local foods grocer and ramen bar that focuses on transparency and sustainability.

In April 2013, Andrea opened Burdock & Co. - a restaurant that continues Chef Andrea's theme of using fresh, local, organic ingredients to create polished, original dishes available at a medium price point.

In August 2020, Carlson opened her third venture, Bar Gobo, a wine bar, in the Chinatown neighbourhood of Vancouver.

== T.V. appearances ==
- http://globalnews.ca/news/2325455/recipe-harvest-squash-ramen/
- http://www.btvancouver.ca/videos/4630067757001/
- http://globalnews.ca/video/2262148/burdock-and-co-chickpea-chanterelle-and-falafel-salad
- http://www.btvancouver.ca/videos/4447216932001/
