= Odessa Piper =

American restaurateur and chef (born 1952)

- Born: Karen Odessa Piper; October 15, 1952 (age 73); Pearl City, Territory of Hawaii, U.S.
- Occupations: Restaurateur, chef
- Known for: Founder of L'Etoile
- Spouse: Terry Theise
- Website: odessapiper.com

Odessa Piper (born Karen Odessa Piper, October 15, 1952) is an American restaurateur and chef, renowned for her role in the farm-to-table movement and her emphasis on sustainable, regional cuisine.

== Early life ==
Piper was born in Pearl City, Hawaii, and raised in Portsmouth, New Hampshire. Her parents taught her how to forage for mushrooms and greens, sparking a lifelong connection to nature. She dropped out of high school, lived for two years in a New Hampshire commune, and became involved in the Back to the Land movement of the 1960s and ’70s. This brought her to a Wisconsin farm in the Kickapoo River Valley owned by JoAnna Guthrie, a theosophy-influenced restaurateur who also ran the Ovens of Brittany in Madison.

In 1969, Piper moved to Madison and began an apprenticeship under Guthrie at the Ovens of Brittany, a restaurant known for its use of organic and locally sourced ingredients.

== Career ==
In 1976, at age 23, Piper founded L'Etoile in Madison. The restaurant emphasized seasonal, regional ingredients, often sourced from vendors at the adjacent Dane County Farmers' Market. Her signature morning bun became a local legend.

L'Etoile was part of a late 20th-century movement emphasizing cuisine crafted exclusively from regional ingredients. Similar pioneering restaurants included Alice Waters' Chez Panisse in Berkeley, California, and Sinclair and Frederique Philip's Sooke Harbour House on Vancouver Island in British Columbia, Canada. In 2001, Piper won the James Beard Award for Best Chef: Midwest, and Gourmet magazine ranked L'Etoile #14 on its list of America's 50 Best Restaurants. She sold the restaurant in 2005 to her chef de cuisine, Tory Miller.

Piper has remained involved in food advocacy. She speaks at events like the International Forum on Consciousness and supports projects such as the Savanna Institute, promoting agroforestry and sustainable Midwestern agriculture. She is also contributing to the Taliesin Preservation and a scratch bakery in Boston.

She contributed recipes—including Amish-style cider syrup—to the *Dane County Farmers’ Market Cookbook* (2023), celebrating the market's 50th anniversary.

== Personal life ==
Piper is married to international wine importer Terry Theise. As of 2023, she lives in Roslindale, Massachusetts, and is writing a book tentatively titled either The Re-enchantment of Food or Back to the Land, Again.
