= Carme Ruscalleda =

Spanish chef

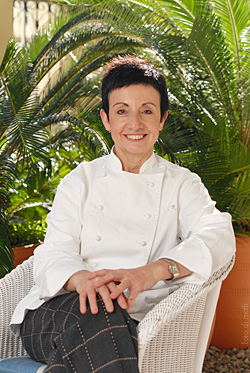
- Carme Ruscalleda
- Born: Carme Ruscalleda i Serra; 1952 (age 73–74); Sant Pol de Mar, Barcelona, Catalonia Spain
- Culinary career
- Cooking style: Catalan tradition
- Rating: Michelin stars Campsa suns
- Current restaurant(s): Sant Pau de sant Pol de Mar; Sant Pau de Tòquio
- Website: http://www.ruscalleda.com/

Carme Ruscalleda i Serra (Catalan pronunciation: [ˈkaɾmə ruskəˈʎɛðə], born in 1952) is the renowned Spanish chef of the restaurant Sant Pau in Sant Pol de Mar, near Barcelona, Catalonia, Spain. She also owns and manages the restaurant Sant Pau de Tòquio in Japan.

Ruscalleda was raised in a family of farmers and began cooking as a girl. She studied Charcuterie techniques, as well as Commerce, and after marrying a grocery owner, Toni Balam in 1975, the couple opened restaurant Sant Pau in 1988. In 1991 it obtained its first Michelin Guide star and in 2006 obtained its third Michelin star. Today her restaurants have seven Michelin stars in total: three in her restaurant in Catalonia and two for the Sant Pau in Tokyo, and two for Moments Restaurant in the Mandarin Oriental Barcelona (opened 2016), making her the world's only seven-Michelin-starred female chef. The restaurant in Sant Pol de Mar also obtained the maximum three suns of the Campsa Guide in 1999.

Her cuisine is based on Catalan tradition though open to world influences, and focuses on quality and seasonal products. She often relates the dishes served to a leitmotif explained in the menu, creating a sort of literary concept.

Since 2000, she has published numerous books on Mediterranean cuisine, including recipes adapted to non-professional kitchens. The most celebrated is Cuinar per ser feliç (2001), Cooking to be happy. In English she has published Carme Ruscalleda's Mediterranean Cuisine (2007), Salsa Books Editions.

Since 2009, Ruscalleda has overseen the two Michelin-starred Moments restaurant at Mandarin Oriental, Barcelona with her son, Raül Balam.

== In popular culture ==
There is a sardana called Carme Ruscalleda in the album Ballem-la (Let's dance it), played by the cobla La Flama and composed by Pere Vilà in 2001.
