= Mariya Russell =

American chef and restaurateur

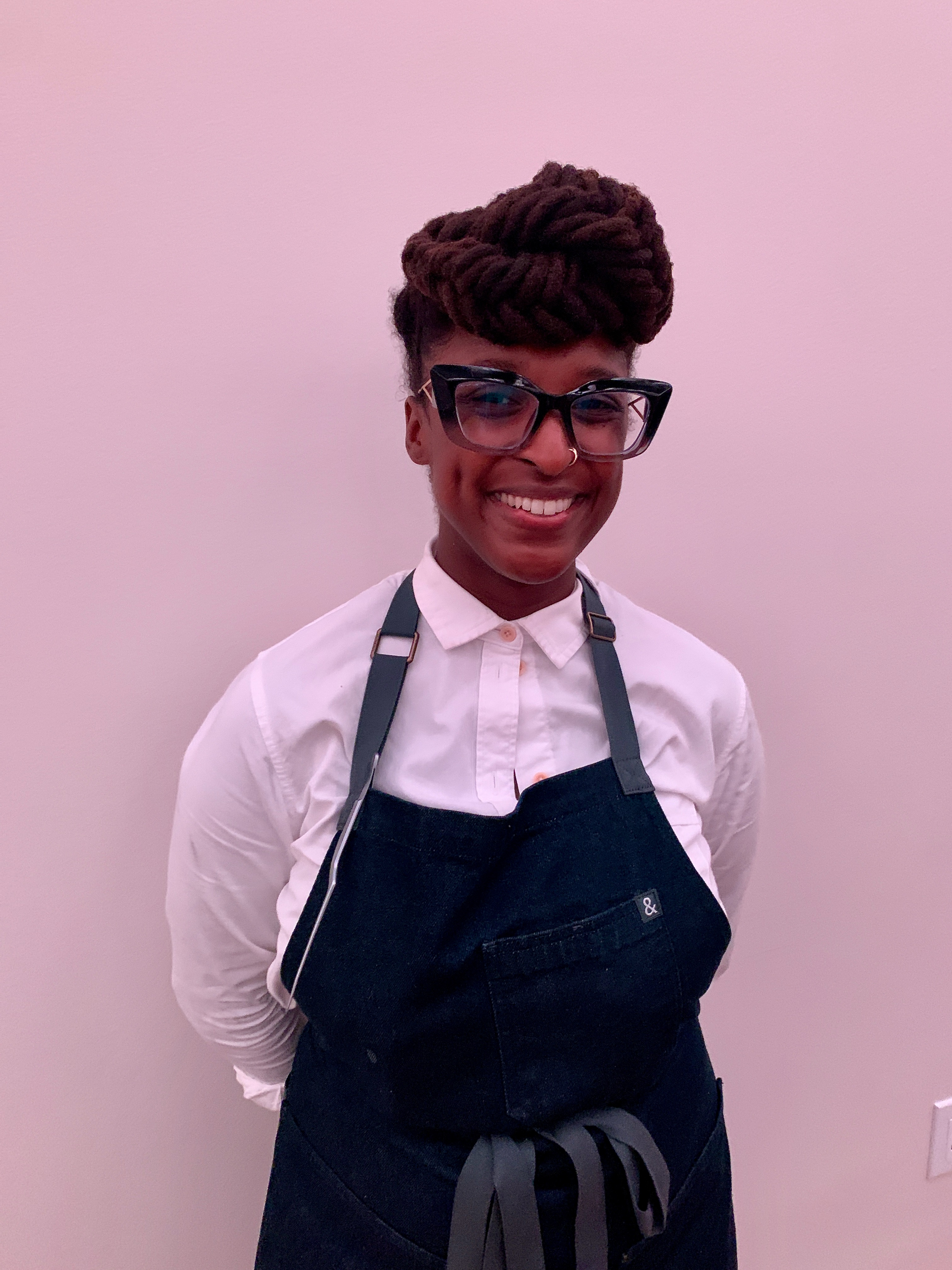
- Born: c. 1989
- Education: Cooking and Hospitality Institute of Chicago
- Known for: first Black woman to be awarded a Michelin star
- Culinary career
- Previous restaurants
- Kumiko and Kikkō

Mariya Moore-Russell (c. 1989) is an African American chef and restaurateur. She became the first Black woman to be awarded a Michelin star in September 2019 while working as a chef at Kumiko and Kikkō.

== Biography ==
Mariya Moore-Russell grew up in Springfield, Ohio, with her parents and four sisters. She moved to Columbus, Ohio for high school where she participated in a career academy that first introduced her to the idea of becoming a chef. After high school, she moved to Chicago and studied at The Cooking and Hospitality Institute of Chicago where she graduated in 2008.

=== Career ===
While in Chicago, Mariya Russell worked at Uncommon Ground, Green Zebra, The Bristol, Nellcote, and Senza. It was at Green Zebra that she met Cara Sandoval and Noah Sandoval who would later invite her to be part of Kumiko and Kikkō. She moved to Charleston, South Carolina with her husband (at the time), chef Garrett Russell, and stayed for three years. They returned to Chicago in 2016 after her father's death and after the realization that Charleston was not an easy place to exist for a black woman. She took a job as a server at Oriole in July 2016 where she went on to become sous-chef and chef de cuisine in 2018. While working at Oriole, Noah Sandoval asked Russell to be the chef for his new project Kumiko and Kikko.

In September 2019, while working at Kumiko and Kikkō, she was awarded a Michelin star, shortly before her 30th birthday. Shortly after receiving the accolade, Russell announced on Instagram that she was taking a break to prioritize her well-being; “I wasn't really able to take care of myself on a day-to-day basis; the job was all I was able to fit into my life at the time...I just wanted to do more for myself and better for myself.”

Chef Mariya decided to pivot her career in the direction of entrepreneurship. She moved to Hawaii in August 2020. Upon returning to the mainland, Russell has focused on running pop-ups and chef collaborations.
