= Catherine Healy (chef) =

Irish chef (died 1993)

- Born: Kells, Meath
- Died: 1993; Dublin
- Resting place: Kells
- Other name: Catherine Strong
- Occupation: Chef
- Employer: Self-employed
- Known for: Michelin-starred Dunderry Lodge
- Spouse: Nicholas (Nick) Healy

Catherine Healy (née Strong) (born Kells, died 1993) was an Irish Michelin-starred head chef during her spell in the kitchen of restaurant Dunderry Lodge.

According to the Irish Independent, she may have been Ireland's greatest female chef.

She, and her husband Nick, sold the restaurant in 1990, due to a terminal illness.

== Career ==
Catherine Healy was a renowned Irish chef. She owned the Dunderry Lodge restaurant with her husband Nick Healy. She was considered one of the most distinguished chefs of her time. After her husband Nick lost his job they acted on their plans to acquire a space to start their business. They decided to purchase the Darcy farm, Gaurie House, in Dunderry and convert it. This construction took 18 months and they opened the restaurant in November 1977. They converted the shed into a lodge and the barn into a dining room.

== Awards ==
- Michelin star 1986-1989
- Red M 1981-1985
- One star Egon Ronay Guide 1983-1985 and 1987–1988.
