= Marie Bourgeois =

French chef

Marie Bourgeois (1870-1937) was a French chef who gained three Michelin stars from 1933 to 1937 for her restaurant in Priay in the Ain region, France.

== Biography ==
Marie Bourgeois was born in Villette-sur-Ain in 1870. In the 1920s, she settled in a modest restaurant with her husband in Priay in the Ain region, 60 km (37 mi) northeast of Lyon. In 1923, Bourgeois was the first woman to receive the award of the Club des Cent.

In 1927, she won first culinary prize in Paris and, six years later, in 1933, she received three stars from the Michelin Guide and kept them for four consecutive years. Her best-known recipes were hot pie, fresh frogs and the floating island with pink pralines.

After her death in 1937, her daughter took over her restaurant until 1951.

== See also ==
Mères of France
