= Dunderry Lodge =

Coordinates: 53°36′14.87″N 6°47′12.44″W

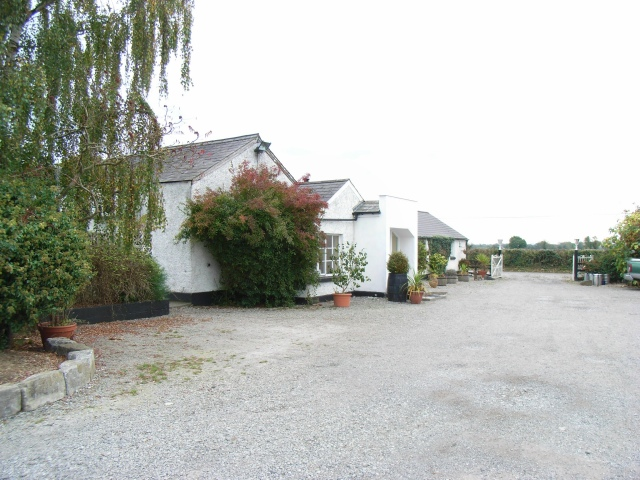
- Dunderry Lodge
- Interactive map of Dunderry Lodge

Restaurant information
- Established: 1982
- Food type: Modern Irish, Traditional irish
- Rating: Michelin Guide
- Location: Dunderry, Navan, County Meath, Ireland
- Seating capacity: 140

Dunderry Lodge was a restaurant in Dunderry, Navan, County Meath, Ireland. It was a fine dining restaurant that was awarded one Michelin star in the period 1986–1989. The Michelin Guide awarded the restaurant the "Red M", indicating 'good food at a reasonable price', in the period 1981–1985. The Egon Ronay Guide awarded the restaurant one star in the period 1983-1985 and 1987–1988.

During the time the restaurant was awarded the Michelin star, head chef was Catherine Healy.

The restaurant was owned by Nick and Catherine Healy. They sold the restaurant in 1990, due a terminal illness of Catherine.

== See also ==
- List of Michelin-starred restaurants in Ireland
