= Julia Komp =

Julia Komp (born 7 April 1989) is a German chef. She is the youngest German female chef to be awarded a Michelin star. She is chief chef at Schloss Loersfeld in Kerpen.

== Early life and education ==
Komp grew up in Overath, and graduated as an intern student at Schloss Lerbach under Dieter Müller (chef), who was awarded three Michelin stars.

== Career ==
Komp was sous chef in the restaurant La Poêle d’O*r in Cologne. She trained as a cook in the restaurant Zur Tant in Cologne's Porz district, where she took a position in the TÜV Rheinland executive lounge.

In 2016, at the age 27, she became the youngest German female chef to be awarded a Michelin star.

Additionally, she has made appearances in several West German Radio Cologne productions, including Here and Now. and at home + on the go und kochen & backen She has also been a judge on ZDF Kitchen Battle since 2018.

In 2020, she was recognized as Cook of the Year by Schlemmer Atlas.

== See also ==
- List of female chefs with Michelin stars
