= The Old Vicarage, Derbyshire =

Coordinates: 53.325°N 1.399°W

The Old Vicarage

Restaurant information
- Rating: (Michelin Guide 2008)
- City: Ridgeway, near Sheffield, South Yorkshire
- Country: England

The Old Vicarage is a restaurant located in Ridgeway, near Sheffield. The restaurant held one star in the Michelin Guide from 1998 to 2015. The head chef is TV chef Tessa Bramley.
