= ONA (restaurant) =

Vegan restaurant in Arès, France

Coordinates: 44.76629°N 1.14027°W

- Interactive map of ONA

Restaurant information
- Rating: 1 Michelin star, 2 Gault Millau chef's hats
- Website: clairevallee.com

ONA was a vegan restaurant in Arès, France, owned by chef Claire Vallée and was the first vegan restaurant to receive a Michelin star. The name stands for origine non-animale and the restaurant used no animal products in its food, decorations or furnishings. ONA was opened in 2016 by Vallée, a self-taught chef, and offered a seven-course tasting menu. 95% of its clientele was neither vegan nor vegetarian, the chef said in 2021. The restaurant closed permanently in October 2022.

== History ==
Vallée opened the restaurant using loans from ethical bank La Nef and crowdfunding. The Michelin Guide for 2021 awarded ONA one Michelin star, a first among vegan restaurants. ONA was also one of 33 restaurants in France to receive a Green Star, a new category by the Michelin Guide awarded for sustainable practices. In 2018, the restaurant had been awarded a Michelin Fork.
