= Chishuru =

African restaurant in London, United Kingdom

Restaurant information
- Established: September 1, 2020
- Owners: Adejoké Bakare; Matt Paice
- Head chef: Adejoké Bakare
- Food type: West African
- Rating: (Michelin Guide)
- Location: Westminster, London
- Website: https://www.chishuru.com/

Chishuru is a Michelin-starred African restaurant in London, United Kingdom.

Chishuru initially started as a three-month pop-up restaurant in the London neighbourhood of Brixton, before moving to its permanent location in the Fitzrovia neighbourhood.

== Reception ==
The restaurant was named Time Out London's best restaurant of 2022. With Chishuru's Michelin Star award in 2024, owner and Head Chef Adejoké Bakare became the first black woman to be awarded this recognition in the United Kingdom.

== See also ==
- List of African restaurants
- List of Michelin-starred restaurants in Greater London
