= Aldo Marelli =

Italian footballer (1919-2010)

Personal information
- Date of birth: April 17, 1919
- Place of birth: Busto Arsizio, Italy
- Date of death: June 8, 2010 (aged 91)
- Place of death: Villa Cortese
- Position: Midfielder

Senior career*
Years	Team	Apps	(Gls)
1938	Genova 1893		
1938–1939	Pro Patria		
1939–1940	Gallaratese		
1941–1942	Gallaratese		
1942–1943	Juventus	3	(0)
1944–1948	Pro Patria		
1948–1949	Empoli	20	(0)
1949–1951	Gallaratese		
- * Club domestic league appearances and goals

Aldo Marelli (17 April 1919 – 8 June 2010) was an Italian professional football player. He played professionally for 6 teams from 1938 until 1951, starting his career with Genova and finishing with Gallaratese.

He was an eclectic defender of Pro Patria during the 1940s. Marelli was grown in the juvenile sector of the team in his town. Good Methodist defender, redeemed himself in the three roles of the median and, with the number 5, played three games with Juventus in Serie A (1942/43). He returned to the team of Busto Arsizio after 1943 and in the mixed championship 1945 B/C, it covered, with worth, the role of right “terzino”. Absent, for alone accident on three occasions, he disputed, the following year, 36 matches on 42, contributing to the promotion of Pro Patria, in Series A at the end of season 1946-47. He was also confirmed in the following season, but unfortunately cause of the application of the system to the structure biancoblù, didn't have the opportunity to express the anticipated dowries of sense of timing to the best from the method, replaced by the careful and untiring playing to man, anticipated from the new typology of game acquired by Pro Patria. It passed to the Empoli that adopted the “half system” and it was found to wonder embodying the role of free forerunner, had adopted then since 1950 in from the best structures of Serie A. For three years he played in the Gallaratese, then in the Aosta and for the last to the Varese. He had trainer of several teams of “Altomilanese”.
