= Luisa Marelli Valazza =

Italian chef (born 1950)

- Born: Luisa Marelli; December 20, 1950 (age 75); Soriso, Italy
- Occupations: Chef, restaurateur
- Spouse: Angelo Valazza

Luisa Marelli Valazza (born 1950) is an Italian chef whose restaurant Al Sorriso, in the Piedmont municipality of Soriso, has been recognized in the Michelin Guide since 1982 when it was awarded its first star. A second star followed in 1988 and a third in 1998.

== Biography ==
Born on 20 December 1950 in Soriso, Luisa Marelli studied Italian literature before entering the restaurant business. She first gained interest in cuisine in Borgomanero where she spent ten years raising a family in the starred restaurant of her husband Angelo Valazza (1970–1980). In 1980, they bought a restaurant in nearby Soriso near Lake Orta. When the chef had to return to Switzerland, she suddenly had to take charge of the kitchen herself. Passionately interested in her new assignment, she began studying the books and recipes of the most famous French and Swiss chefs such as Frédy Girardet, Georges Blanc and Jacques Pic.

Al Sorriso was awarded its first Michelin star in 1982, its second in 1988 and its third in 1998, making Luisa Valazza one of only three women in Italy with three Michelin stars. In 1999, the restaurant was included in Relais & Châteaux and was cited for cucina eccellente by the Accademia Italiana della Cucina.

Luisa Valazza ascribes it all to her husband: "This restaurant's success is above all due to Angelo... He is the one who has always had a gift for public relations and catering. He is the one who taught me everything. I never did any apprenticeships. He was a chef before I was. I just stepped in to sort out an emergency."

== See also ==
- List of female chefs with Michelin stars
