= Naha (restaurant) =

Restaurant in Chicago, Illinois, U.S.

- Interactive map of Naha

Restaurant information
- Established: 2000
- Closed: March 31, 2018
- Previous owner: Carrie Nahabedian
- Head chef: Carrie Nahabedian
- Food type: Mediterranean
- Rating: (Michelin Guide)
- Location: 500 North Clark Street, Chicago, Illinois, 60654, United States
- Coordinates: 41°53′27.7″N 87°37′52.6″W

Naha was a Mediterranean restaurant in Chicago, Illinois. Chef Carrie Nahabedian opened it in 2000 with her cousin Michael Nahabedian, its general manager. Naha received one Michelin star in the inaugural 2011 Chicago guide.

== History ==
The original restaurant at 500 North Clark Street closed on March 31, 2018, after 18 years. The Nahabedians announced plans to move the restaurant.

== See also ==
- List of Michelin-starred restaurants in Chicago
