= Kikko (restaurant) =

Restaurant in Chicago, Illinois, U.S.

- Interactive map of Kikko

Restaurant information
- Chef: Mariya Russell (former)
- Location: 630 West Lake Street, Chicago, Illinois, 60661, United States
- Coordinates: 41°53′9.5″N 87°38′38.5″W

Kikko was a Japanese restaurant in Chicago, Illinois, United States. It opened on May 22, 2019, as Kumiko's basement tasting counter. Kikko received a Michelin star in the 2020 Chicago selection under chef Mariya Russell, who left before the COVID-19 pandemic. Its dining room remained closed in July and December 2021.

== See also ==
- List of Japanese restaurants
- List of Michelin-starred restaurants in Chicago
