= Carrie Nahabedian =

American chef (born 1958)

- Born: July 22, 1958 (age 68); Chicago, Illinois, U.S.
- Culinary career
- Cooking style: Modern European
- Ratings: Michelin stars; AAA Motor Club
- Current restaurant(s): Brindille, NAHA
- Award won: 2008 James Beard Foundation Award for the Great Lakes

Carrie Nahabedian (born July 22, 1958) is an American chef best known for her work at the one Michelin star restaurant NAHA in Chicago, Illinois. She has previously worked in a variety of restaurants, and while at NAHA, she won a James Beard Foundation Award in 2008.

== Biography ==
Growing up she was influenced in her cooking by her mother, but also by celebrity chef Julia Child. She later described watching Child as "like watching an artist painting". Nahabedian started her culinary career with a three-year apprenticeship at the Ritz Carlton Hotel in Chicago where she was mentored by Fernand Gutierrez. She then moved to Atlantic City, New Jersey, to become assistant chef to the garde manger at the Resorts Casino Hotel when it first opened.

She moved back to Chicago to work at Le Perroquet before moving onto a variety of restaurants in Europe before returning to the United States where she became the first woman to work at Chicago's Le Francais. She went on to work at a number of other Illinois-based restaurants. In 1989, she became sous chef at the Four Seasons Hotel Chicago, going on to become executive chef, which was her first time at that level. She stayed within the Four Seasons Hotels chain, moving to the Four Seasons Hotel Biltmore.

After eight years in California with the hotel chain, Nahabedian returned to Chicago to open her restaurant NAHA. It would go on to win a Michelin star which it held until the restaurant closed in 2019.

== Awards and honors ==
In 2008, Nahabedian was awarded the James Beard Foundation Award for the Great Lakes region. Mayor of Chicago Richard M. Daley named September 22, 2009 in honor of Nahabedian, the same day that she was inducted into the Chicago Culinary Museum's Chefs Hall of Fame.

Naha was given four AAA Motor Club diamonds for the first time in 2012. As of the 2012 edition of the Michelin Guide, Nahabedian is one of only ten female chefs in the United States to hold a Michelin star.

== Personal life ==
Nahabedian is of Armenian descent, due to her Armenian grandmother Rose.
