= Sant Pau (restaurant) =

Coordinates: 41°36′09″N 2°37′25″E

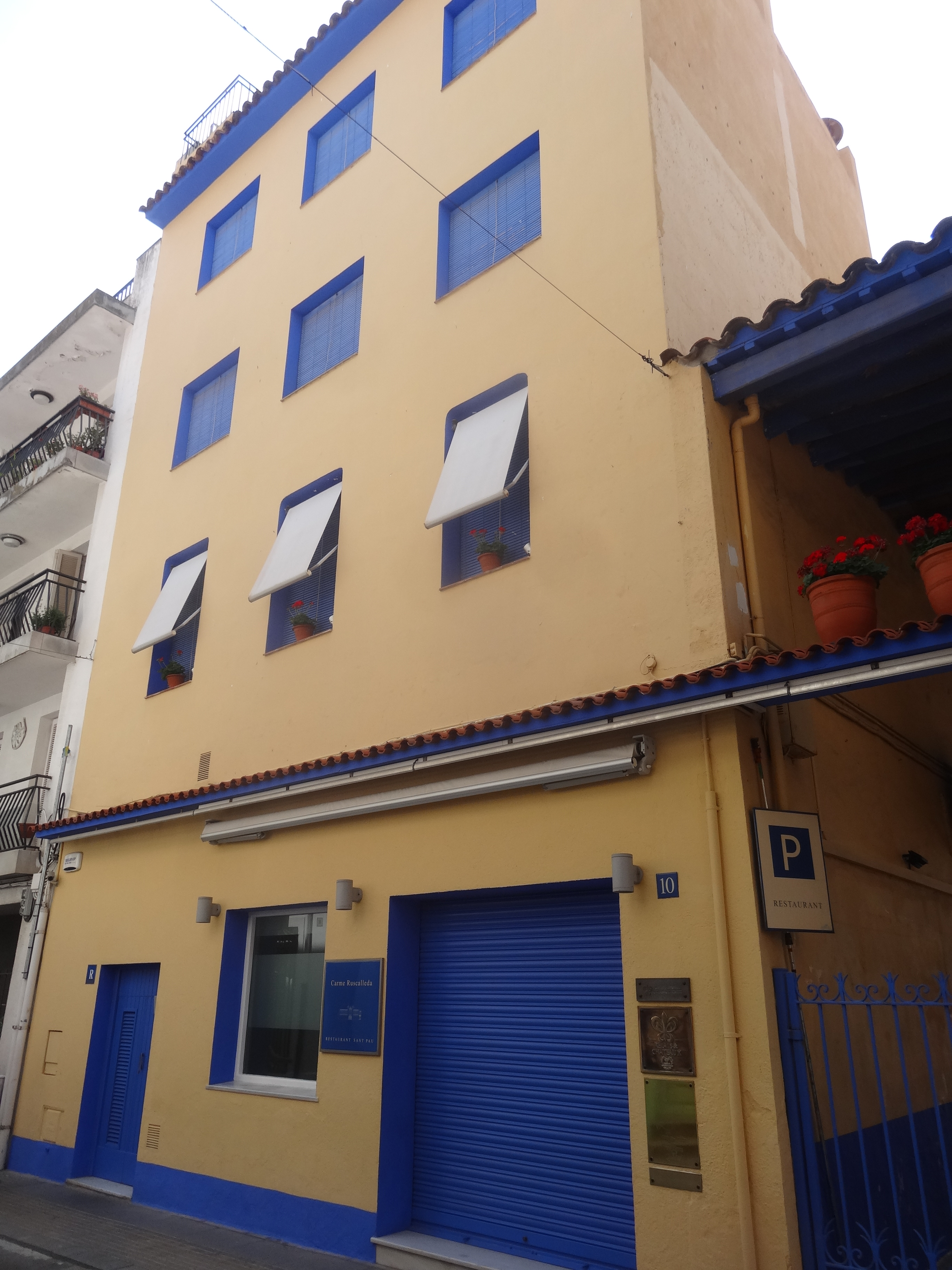
- Exterior of Restaurant Sant Pau (Sant Pol de Mar).
- Interactive map of Sant Pau

Restaurant information
- Established: 1988
- Closed: 2018
- Chef: Carme Ruscalleda
- Food type: Catalan
- Location: Sant Pol de Mar, Spain
- Other locations: Chūō, Tokyo (closed 2 September 2023)
- Succeeded by: Cuina Sant Pau

Sant Pau was a Spanish restaurant in Sant Pol de Mar, Catalonia (Spain), a town between Barcelona and Girona. In 2009 it was awarded three Michelin stars and three Campsa-Repsol suns. Its chef is Carme Ruscalleda, and the dining room was directed by Toni Balam. In 2006 Sant Pau opened a branch in Chuo-ku, Tokyo which currently has 2 Michelin stars.

In 2018, Carme Ruscalleda closed the restaurant in Sant Pol de Mar.

== Awards ==
- 1992 They represent Catalan cooking in Sevilla's Universal Exposition.
- 1995 Price Best Chef, by the guide Lo mejor de la gastronomía
- Medalla al Mèrit Cívic, by Obra del Ballet Popular
- 1997 Price Restaurant Of the Year, by Gourmetour
- 1998 Premio Nacional de Gastronomía, by Academia Española de Gastronomía, Cofradía de la Buena Mesa and Secretaría de Estado y Turismo de España.
- Price Sánchez Cotán, by Academia Española de Gastronomía
- Price Davidoff
- Price Nadal de la Gastronomia for being the Restaurant of the Year
- Price Chef of the Year to Carme Ruscalleda
- 2000 Price Golden Chef to Carme Ruscalleda, by Intxaurrondoko Gastronomi Elkartea
- 2001 Price Dona Emprenedora to Carme Ruscalleda, by FIDEM
- 2004 Price Restaurant Of the Year, by Gourmetour
- 2008 Creu de Sant Jordi to Carme Ruscalleda, by Generalitat de Catalunya

== See also ==
- List of Spanish restaurants
