= Claire Vallée =

French chef (born 1980)

Claire Vallée (born 1980) is a French chef. Her restaurant, ONA, was the first vegan establishment to win a Michelin star.

== Early life ==
She was born in 1980 in Nancy and spent her childhood in Montélimar. She holds a doctorate in archaeology.

== Career ==
After her studies, she took a summer job at a restaurant in Crans-Montana, Switzerland, and ended up staying for eight years. She trained as a pastry chef. Following some time in Thailand, she became a vegetarian, and on her return to France was reluctant to work with meat or fish.

In 2016 she opened a vegan restaurant in Arès, near Bordeaux, in southwestern France. It is called ONA, which stands for "Origine non animale", not of animal origin. She financed her business through a crowdfunding campaign that raised 10,000 euros and through La Nef, an ethical finance co-operative. Aside from the food, Vallée extends veganism to the drinks and the decor of the restaurant, which uses renewable electricity and composts its wastes. The restaurant closed permanently in October 2022.

== Recognition ==
In 2018 the Michelin Guide awarded ONA one fork, a symbol for a restaurant of comfort and quality. Rival guide Gault Millau gave her two chef's hats, its equivalent symbol. This made ONA the first organic and vegan establishments recognised by these guides.

In 2021, she received the first Michelin star awarded to a vegan restaurant. The Michelin Guide also gave her a Green Star for excellence in sustainable gastronomy.
