= Harald Wohlfahrt =

German chef (born 1955)

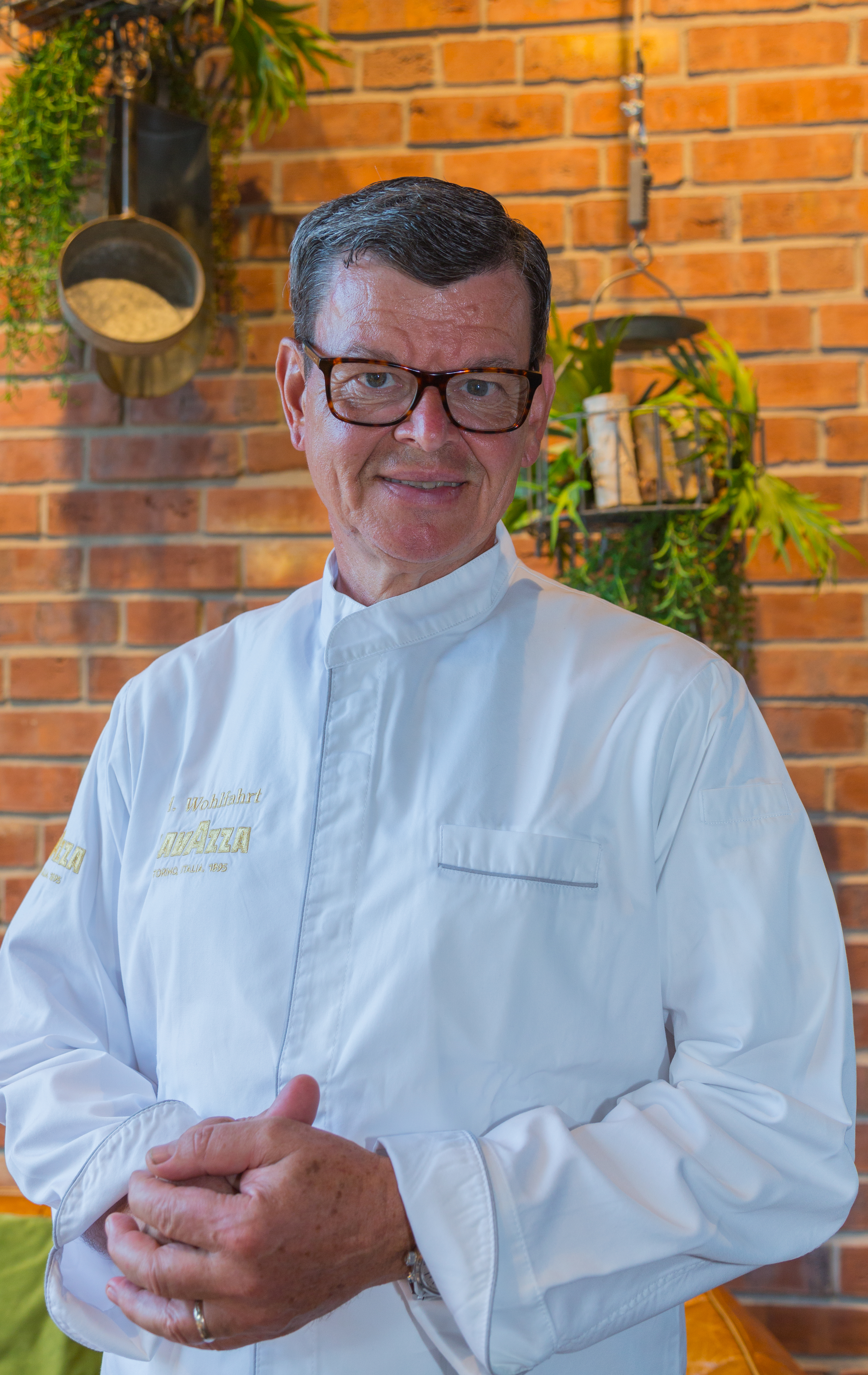
- Born: 7 November 1955 (age 71); Loffenau, Germany
- Culinary career
- Cooking style: German
- Current restaurant
- Hotel Traube – Baiersbronn

Harald Wohlfahrt (German pronunciation: [ˈhaːʁalt ˈvoːlfaːɐ̯t]; born 7 November 1955) is a German chef. In 2005, he was awarded the Bundesverdienstkreuz. He is frequently rated as the best German chef and among the finest chefs in Europe.

Wohlfahrt's claim for fame is that his former restaurant, Schwarzwaldstube in Baiersbronn-Tonbach (Baden-Württemberg), has maintained three stars for 25 consecutive years under his leadership, a record in Germany. It was voted 35th best in the world in the Restaurant Top 50 and, in 2009, it was voted 23rd in the worlds 50 best Restaurants.

Wohlfahrt is credited with training six of the other nine German chefs awarded three-stars in the "Guide Michelin 2013 - Deutschland".

In 2017, Wohlfahrt was expected to hand over the head chef position at Hotel Traube Tonbach to Torsten Michel. As part of the succession plan, Wohlfahrt was supposed to assume the newly formed position of "Culinary Director" for the entire Hotel Traube Tonbach. In this executive position, top chef Wohlfahrt had neither an operative role in the restaurant nor any opportunity to further develop the culinary arts. In the transition through the succession plan, Wohlfahrt was for some period formally banned from entering the Schwarzwaldstube. Wohlfahrt eventually sued the hotel and its owner in order to maintain the head chef position. On 25 July 2017, the court case was settled and closed as both parties reached an undisclosed agreement. Wohlfahrt will no longer be part of the Hotel Traube Tonbach.
