= State Bird Provisions =

San Francisco restaurant

- Interactive map of State Bird Provisions

Restaurant information
- Established: 2012
- Owners: Stuart Brioza and Nicole Krasinski
- Food type: Californian cuisine
- Rating: (Michelin Guide)
- Location: 1529 Fillmore Street, San Francisco, California, 94115, United States
- Coordinates: 37.7837089°N 122.4329937°W
- Website: https://statebirdsf.com/

State Bird Provisions is a San Francisco restaurant founded by chef-owners Stuart Brioza and Nicole Krasinski.

== Background ==
Brioza and Krasinski are both natives of the San Francisco Bay Area. Brioza graduated from culinary school at the Hyde Park campus of the Culinary Institute of America. Krasinski was trained in pastry and baking under Chef Nancy Carey at the Red Hen Bakery in Chicago. Brioza started his cooking career under Chef John Hogan at Savarin restaurant in Chicago. In the spring of 2000, Brioza and Krasinski were hired to be the Executive Chef and Pastry Chef at Tapawingo restaurant in Ellsworth, Michigan.

In 2003, Brioza was recognized as one of Food & Wine magazine's Best New Chefs in America.

In 2004, Brioza and Krasinski were hired by Drew Nieporent as the executive chef and pastry chef at his restaurant Rubicon in San Francisco. The restaurant closed in 2008.

== State Bird Provisions ==
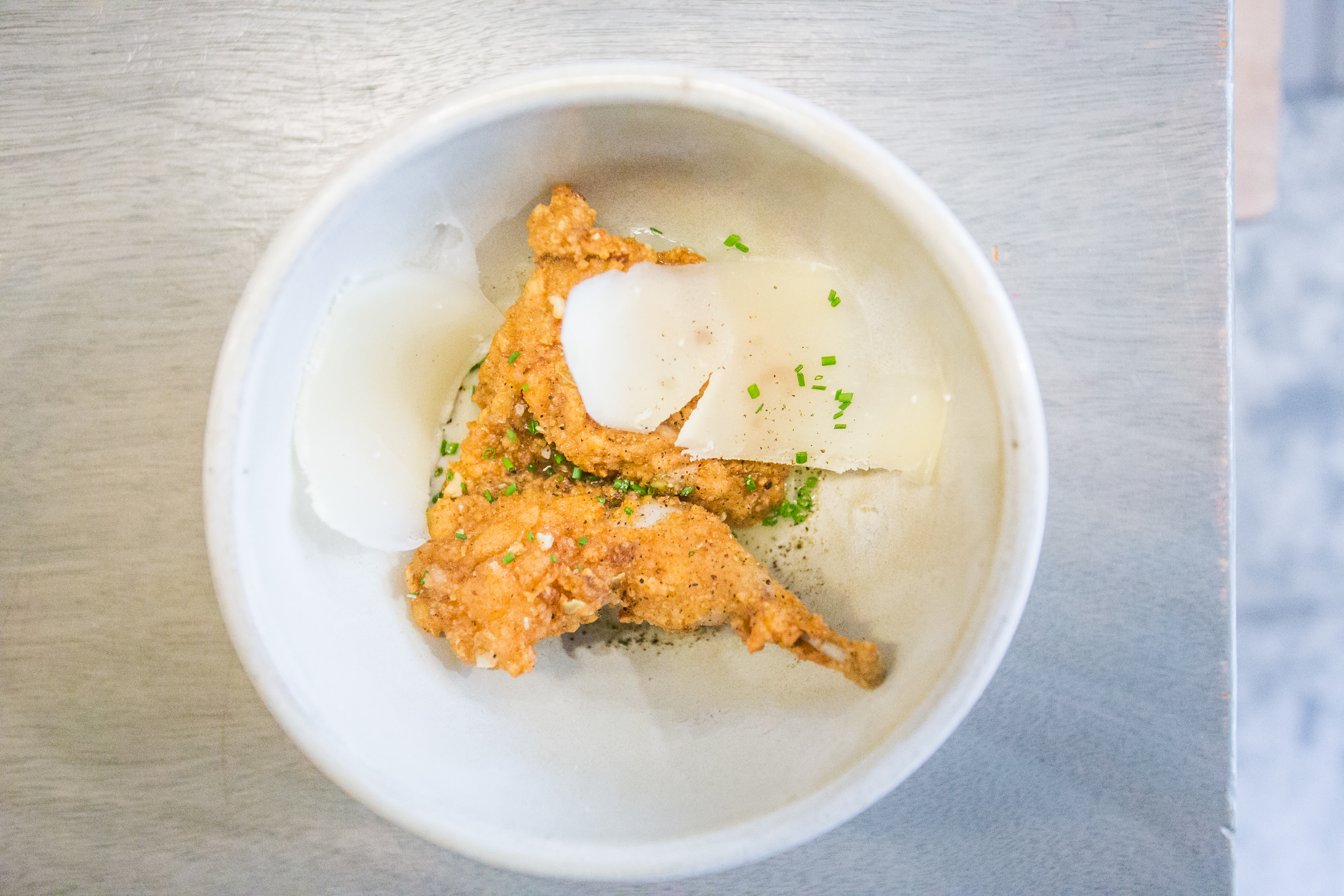
State Bird Provisions' signature dish, fried quail with lemon and onions.

In 2012, Brioza and Krasinski opened their own restaurant, State Bird Provisions, in the Fillmore District of San Francisco. The name of the restaurant was inspired by a crispy spiced quail that was on their menu at Rubicon (the California quail is the state bird of California). The "provisions" at the restaurant are small plates served on Dim sum-style carts or trays.

The restaurant quickly received national and international recognition, named by Bon Appétit and the James Beard Foundation as the Best New Restaurant in America. Zagat named it one of the 10 hottest restaurants in the world.

In August 2013, the restaurant closed for two months of remodeling, expanding the dining area with larger tables and adding a stand-up oyster bar. When it reopened in October 2013, it was just in time for the news that State Bird Provisions received a star in the 2014 Michelin Guide for the San Francisco Bay Area.

Brioza and Krasinski won the James Beard Award for Best Chef: West in 2015.

== The Progress ==
In 2014, Brioza and Krasinski opened a new restaurant called The Progress in an adjacent space in the same building as State Bird Provisions. The name derives from the early-20th century Progress Theater that was originally housed in the building. In contrast to the casual small plates at State Bird Provisions, The Progress featured a more formal family-style menu.

The Progress received local and national recognition, including a 3-star review from the San Francisco Chronicle, and inclusion on Esquire magazine's list of Best New Restaurants in America. The restaurant was the only new restaurant to receive a Michelin star in the 2017 Michelin Guide for the San Francisco Bay Area.

== Cookbook ==
Brioza and Krasinski published a cookbook in 2017, State Bird Provisions: A Cookbook.

== See also ==
- List of Michelin-starred restaurants in California
