= De Lindenhorst =

Coordinates: 50°52′18.18″N 5°48′58.39″E

- Interactive map of De Lindenhorst

Restaurant information
- Established: 1981
- Closed: 2004
- Head chef: Ida Kleijnen
- Location: Broekhem 130, Valkenburg, 6301 HL, Netherlands

De Lindenhorst is a defunct restaurant in Valkenburg, Netherlands. It was a fine dining restaurant that was awarded one Michelin star in 1983 and retained that rating until 1993.

Head chef in the time of the Michelin star was Ida Kleijnen.

Owner Ida Kleijnen sold the restaurant in 1994 to her son Paul Keijdener. The same day, they learned the restaurant had lost its Michelin star.

== See also ==
- List of Michelin starred restaurants in the Netherlands
