= Schwarzwaldstube (restaurant) =

Restaurant in Germany

- Interactive map of Schwarzwaldstube

Restaurant information
- Established: 1977
- Head chef: Torsten Michel
- Rating: (Michelin Guide)
- Location: Baiersbronn, Germany
- Coordinates: 48°32′12.9″N 8°21′29.8″E
- Website: traube-tonbach.de/restaurants-bar/schwarzwaldstube

Schwarzwaldstube (English: Black Forest Parlor) is a restaurant located in the Traube Tonbach Hotel in Baiersbronn, Germany. Since 1993, the restaurant has maintained its three-star Michelin rating, the longest streak for any restaurant in Germany. The gastronomy portal Restaurant-Ranglisten ranked the restaurant first in Germany.

In 2024, Schwarzwaldstube was ranked among the world's top restaurants with 99.5 points in the La Liste ranking, sharing the position with eight other restaurants, including Restaurant Guy Savoy in Paris and Le Bernardin in New York.

== History ==
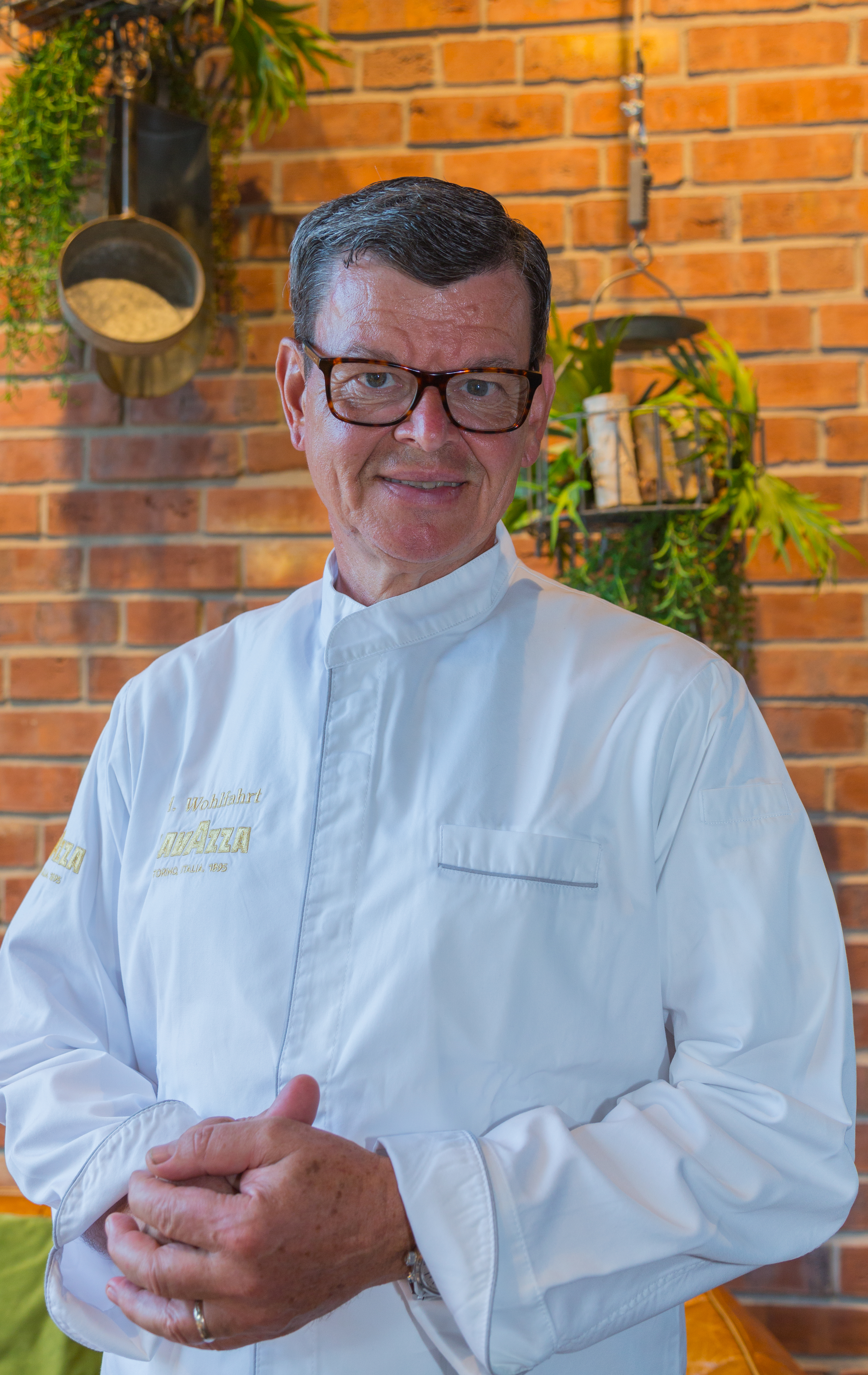
Harald Wohlfahrt (2019)

The Schwarzwaldstube was established in 1977, with Wolfgang Staudenmaier as the head chef and Heiner Finkbeiner as the restaurant manager. Shortly after its opening, the Schwarzwaldstube earned two Michelin stars.

In 1980, Harald Wohlfahrt became the head chef. The restaurant was awarded three Michelin stars for the first time in the Michelin Guide1993.

In 2017, Torsten Michel succeeded Harald Wohlfahrt as head chef and maintained the three-star rating.

In January 2020, a fire destroyed the original building of the Schwarzwaldstube, necessitating its demolition. The restaurant reopened in a temporary location named "Temporaire" at the end of May 2021. The original site was rebuilt, and on 8 April 2022, the Schwarzwaldstube reopened in its newly constructed premises. In 2022, the restaurant was again awarded three Michelin stars.

== See also ==
- List of Michelin-starred restaurants in Germany
