= Priay =

Commune in Auvergne-Rhône-Alpes, France

- Commune
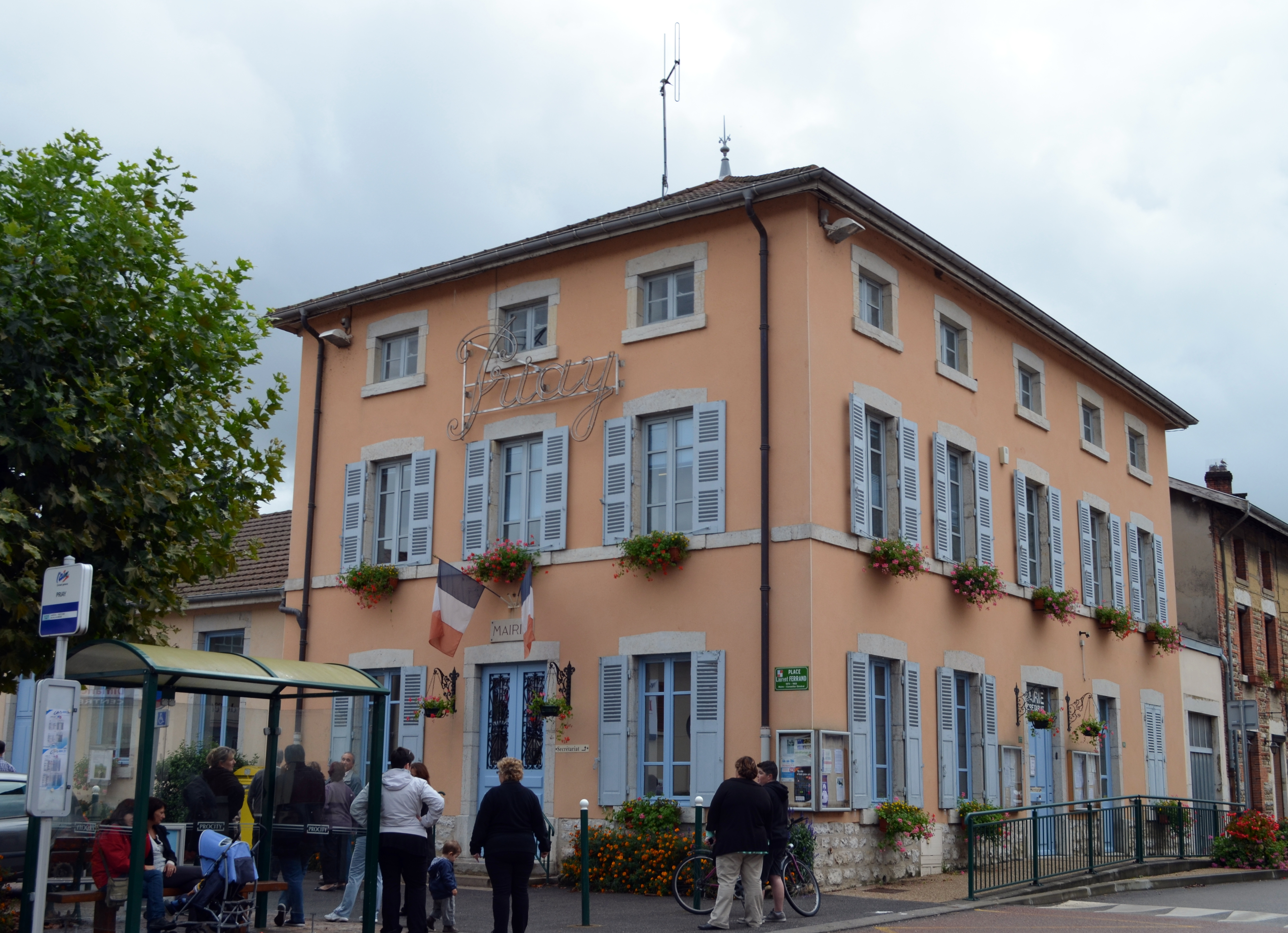
- Town hall

- Coat of arms
- Location of Priay
- Location within France Location within Auvergne-Rhône-Alpes
- Coordinates: 46°00′14″N 5°17′28″E
- Country: France
- Region: Auvergne-Rhône-Alpes
- Department: Ain
- Arrondissement: Nantua
- Canton: Pont-d'Ain

Government
  - Mayor (2026–32): Fabienne Charmetant
- Area^{1}: 15.77 km^{2} (6.09 sq mi)
- Elevation: 240 m (790 ft)
- Highest elevation: 342 m (1,122 ft)
- Lowest elevation: 222 m (728 ft)
- Population (2023): 1,842
  - Density: 116.8/km^{2} (302.5/sq mi)
- Time zone: UTC+01:00 (CET)
  - Summer (DST): UTC+02:00 (CEST)
- INSEE/Postal code: 01314 /01160
- ^{1} French Land Register data, which excludes lakes, ponds, glaciers > 1 km^{2} (0.386 sq mi or 247 acres) and river estuaries.

Priay (French pronunciation: [pʁijɛ]) is a commune in the Ain department in the Auvergne-Rhône-Alpes region of eastern France.

== Population ==
Historical population
| Year | Pop. | ±% p.a. |
|---|---|---|
| 1968 | 710 | — |
| 1975 | 771 | +1.18% |
| 1982 | 787 | +0.29% |
| 1990 | 948 | +2.35% |
| 1999 | 1,152 | +2.19% |
| 2007 | 1,433 | +2.77% |
| 2012 | 1,553 | +1.62% |
| 2017 | 1,729 | +2.17% |
| 2023 | 1,842 | +1.06% |
Source: INSEE

People from Priay are known as Priaysiens in French.

== See also ==
- Communes of the Ain department
