= Sooke Harbour House =

Inn and restaurant in British Columbia, Canada

Coordinates: 48.3565°N 123.7275°W

Sinclair Philip in the cellar of the Sooke Harbour House, 2003.

Sooke Harbour House is an inn and restaurant located in Sooke, British Columbia, Canada, on the southern tip of Vancouver Island.

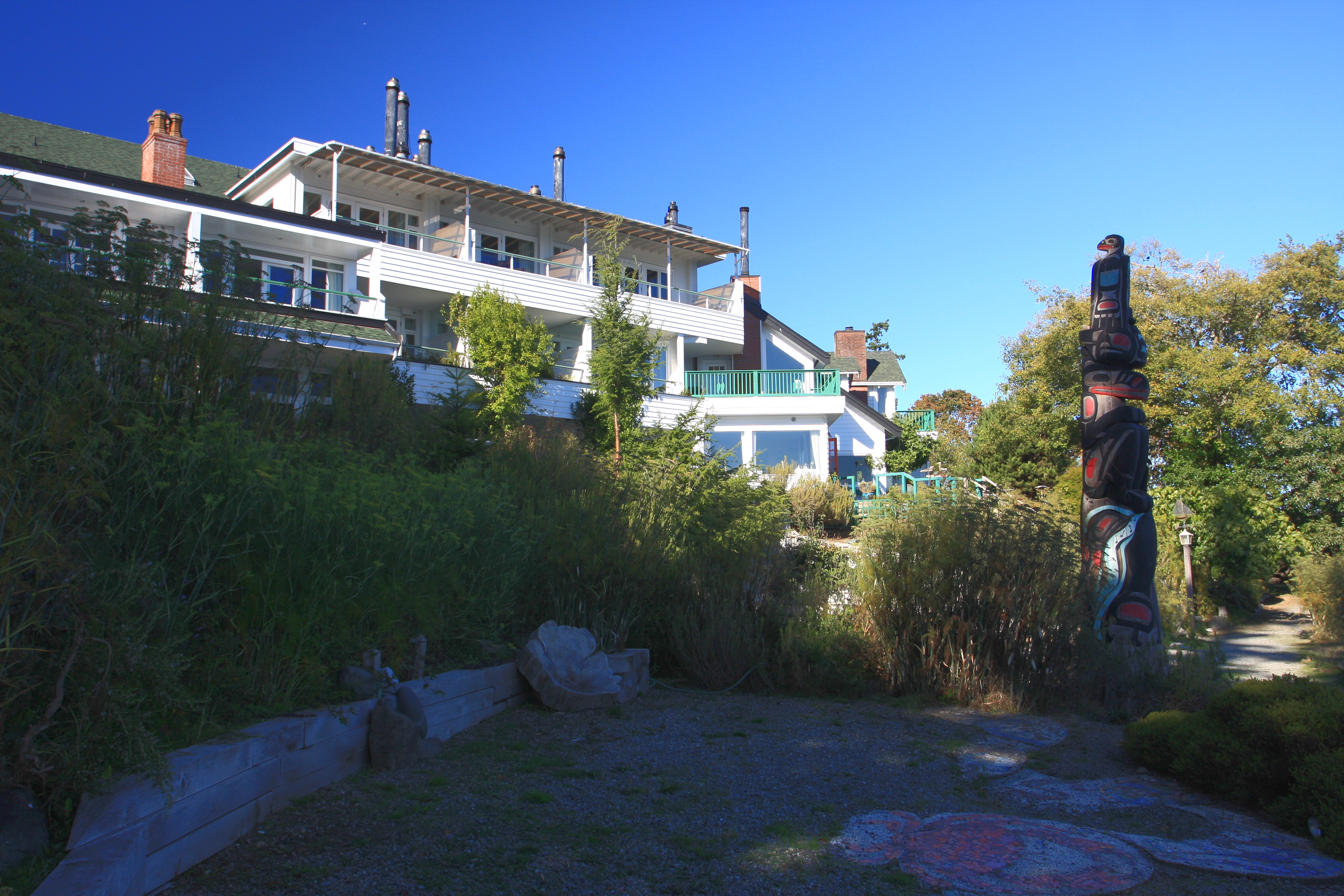
Exterior of Sooke Harbour House

The establishment has been owned by Frederique and Sinclair Philip since 1979. Sinclair is the Canadian representative for Slow Food in Italy and some years ago was a Slow Food Vancouver Island Convivium leader. He has a doctorate in political economics from the University of Grenoble in France. In 2000, a writer for The New York Times called Sooke Harbour House "one of Canada's half-dozen best restaurants".

In May 2012, Sooke Harbour House was put up for sale, at $5.9 million. The Philips cited financial pressure from a decline in the tourism industry, along with stress, as reasons for the decision. The establishment ultimately did not sell. In 2015, it was reported that the Business Development Bank of Canada initiated a foreclosure action against the inn for owing $2.9 million on a mortgage from 1997. Denying that they were in foreclosure, the Philips eventually agreed with new investors to sell the property, pay back the mortgage, and begin expanding the property. However, this led to protracted legal battles between the Philips and the investors. Timothy Durkin, the investor, sued Frederique and Sinclair for control of the business, which resulted in an interim order from a judge to the Philips to "immediately quit and leave the business premises". Amidst the ongoing legal battle for ownership, Sooke Harbour House was put up for sale for $5.63 million in April 2020 as part of a foreclosure sale ordered by the courts.

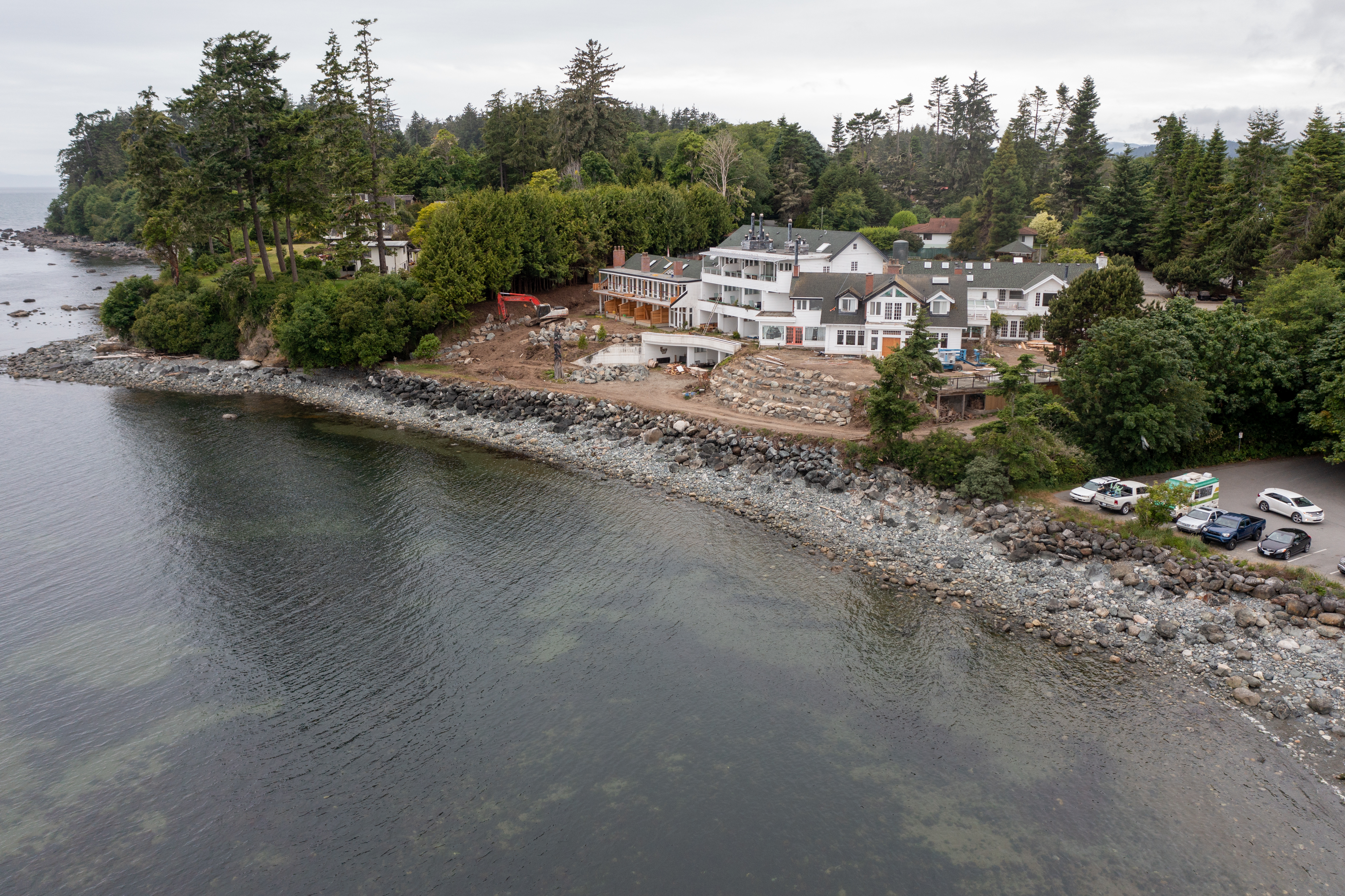
Aerial photograph of Sooke Harbour House under renovation in 2021

In June 2020, it was announced that the real estate company IAG Enterprises would purchase the property for $5.6 million. IAG COO Alex Watson noted that the company wants to reopen Sooke Harbour House in 2021, after renovating different areas of the site.

In September 2020, after a 56-day trial, British Columbia Supreme Court Justice Jasvinder Basrann awarded Frederique and Sinclair Philip "more than $4 million for the 'six-year odyssey of lies, excuses, threats, intimidation and bullying' they suffered at the hands of Timothy Durkin and his partner Rodger Gregory." In a 94-page ruling, Basran concluded the Philips' "reasonable expectation of a comfortable and well-deserved retirement has been effectively stolen from them because they unknowingly put their future in the hands of these two fundamentally dishonest individuals." The Philip's attorney stated that his clients are unlikely to collect the $4 million in damages, because "Durkin has no assets listed in his name—no car, no property, no Canadian bank account". Durkin filed a notice of his intent to appeal Basran's decision. After the Philips paid legal fees and lenders, and the federal, provincial, and municipal governments collected what was owed for late and unpaid taxes, the couple was left with nothing from the sale.
