= Eugénie Brazier =

French chef (1895–1977)

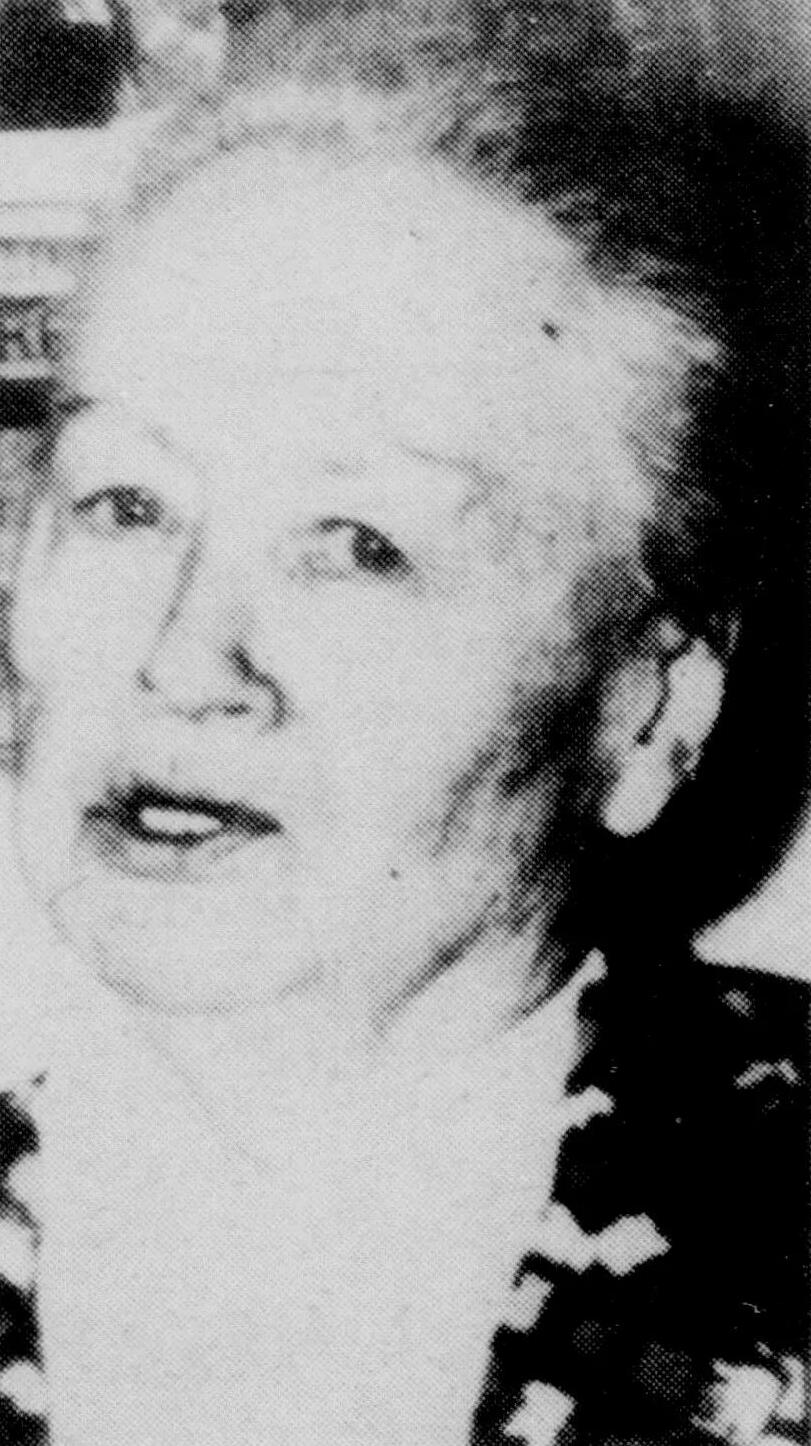
- Photo from a 1977 obituary
- Born: 12 June 1895; La Tranclière, Ain, France
- Died: 2 March 1977 (aged 81); Sainte-Foy-lès-Lyon, France
- Children: Gaston Brazier (son) (1914–1974)
- Culinary career
- Cooking style: Lyonnaise cuisine
- Rating
- Michelin stars
- Current restaurant
- La Mère Brazier (now owned by Mathieu Viannay)

Eugénie Brazier (12 June 1895 – 2 March 1977), known as "la Mère Brazier", was a French chef who, in 1933, became the first person awarded six Michelin stars, three each at two restaurants: La Mère Brazier in the rue Royale, one of the main streets of Lyon, and a second, also called La Mère Brazier, outside the city. This achievement was unmatched until Alain Ducasse was awarded six stars with the publication of the 1998 Michelin Guide.

Born in La Tranclière in the French departement of Ain, near Lyon, Brazier was raised on a small farm, and entered domestic service in her teens. She learned to cook for her employers, and was taken on as a junior cook by the proprietor of a leading restaurant in Lyon. In 1921 she opened her own restaurant there, and having built the establishment into a nationally famous restaurant by the end of the decade, she opened a second in a converted chalet at the Col de la Luère in the foothills of the Massif Central above the city.

Brazier followed the traditions of Lyon's famous female cooks – the Mères lyonnaises – in avoiding over-elaborate dishes, preferring to offer fairly simple food of the highest quality. She influenced subsequent generations of French cooks, including Paul Bocuse and Bernard Pacaud, whom she trained at her restaurant. She is commemorated in scholarships and annual prizes for cookery writing awarded in her name. Her own recipes were collected and published in 1977 and an English translation was issued in 2014. She was offered but declined the Légion d'honneur, the highest French order of merit. Her original restaurant in Lyon, run by her family for many years after her death, was bought by the Michelin-starred chef Mathieu Viannay in 2007, who retains her classics on the menu.

== Life and career ==
=== Early years ===
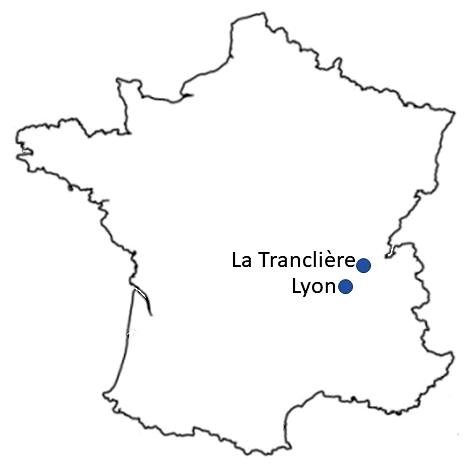
La Tranclière and Lyon

Brazier was born on 12 June 1895 at La Tranclière, a village 6 kilometres (3.7 miles) south of Bourg-en-Bresse and 60 kilometres (37 miles) north-east of Lyon. Her parents had a small farm at Dompierre-sur-Veyle, and when she was still a baby the family moved to a larger farm at Certines around 10 kilometres (6.2 miles) away, where she grew up. She learned about cookery while still a child; by the time she was five she knew how to make the sweet and savoury tarts her mother cooked for the family, and among the dishes she first learned to make was barbaton, consisting of fried bacon, onion, potatoes and garlic. Her schooling was confined to the winter months, and then only when she was not busy working on the farm. When she was ten her mother died, and her education opportunities became even less regular. Though she could read well enough, she was never a confident writer. She was sent to work on another farm, where, she recalled, in addition to her board and lodging she received a pair of clogs and a new dress each year. She continued as a farm worker throughout her teens.

In 1914, aged 19, the unmarried Brazier gave birth to a son, Gaston. Unmarried mothers were, as she later said, "definitely frowned on in those days", and according to some sources her father threw her out, although she did not say so in her published recollections. She entered domestic service in Lyon for a large family named Milliat, prosperous bakers and manufacturers of pasta. At first she worked as a maid and nanny, and began cooking in 1915 when the women and children of the family moved to a villa in Cannes for the summer. She had no recipe books, and provided meals based on what she had picked up from the family's cook in Lyon and with advice from the concierge in Cannes. She discovered some supposedly tricky recipes such as hollandaise sauce were less daunting than they were often thought: "Cooking is not complicated: you have to be well organised, to remember things and have a bit of taste. I learned to cook by doing it – as simple as that." (Note: "La cuisine, ce n'est pas compliqué, il faut savoir s'organiser, avoir de la mémoire et un peu de goût. Moi j'ai appris à faire la cuisine en la faisant, tout simplement.")

=== Cook in Lyon ===
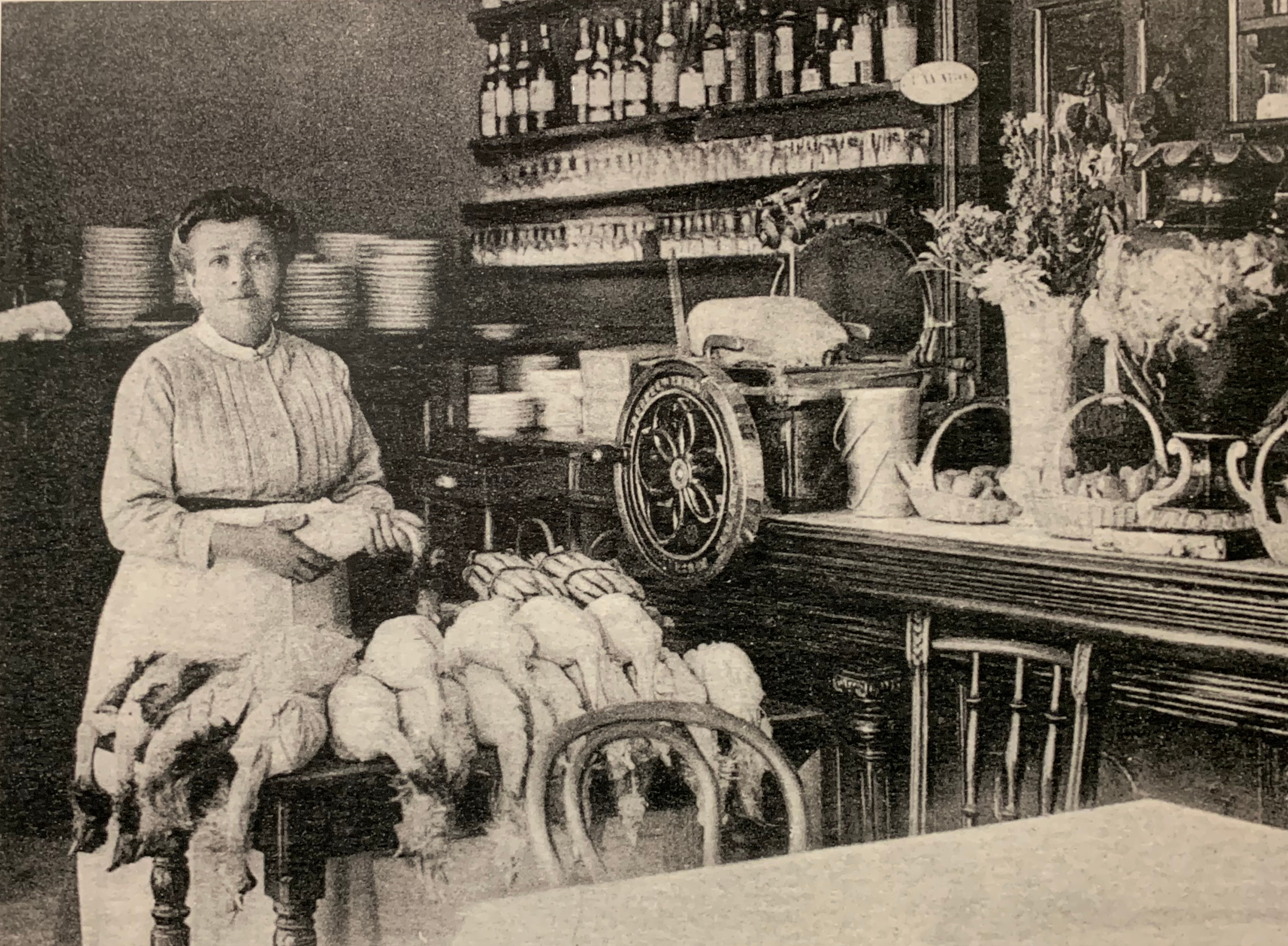
La Mère Fillioux in her restaurant kitchen with the chickens for her volaille truffée demi-deuil

Around the end of the First World War, after a few years working for the Milliats, (Note: Brazier did not specify the dates in her reminiscences.) Brazier was taken on by a leading restaurateur in Lyon, Françoise Fillioux (or Filloux) (Note: The surname is spelled either as "Filloux" or "Fillioux" in contemporary and later publications. George Moore uses the shorter version in his Conversations in Ebury Street (1924), and it is so spelled in Elizabeth David's French Provincial Cooking (1960), Georges Blanc's Simple French Cooking: Recipes from Our Mothers' Kitchens (2001), the English edition of The Traditions of Lyon's Gastronomy by Gérald Gambier (2002) and in Drew Smith's translation of Les secrets de la Mère Brazier (2015). The longer form is used on the website of the Bibliothèque nationale de France, and by writers on the subject including Alexis Lichine (1951), Joseph Wechsberg (1964), Drew Smith (1990), and Bernard Boucheix (2017). The contemporary French press was similarly divided about the spelling: in Le Figaro she was Fillioux, in Paris-soir she was Filloux, and the trade paper La Toque blanche used both spellings of her name at various times. A commemorative plaque on the site of the bistro uses the longer spelling.) in her women-only kitchen at le Bistrot Fillioux. La Mère Fillioux was a temperamental and demanding employer but under her supervision Brazier learned to make some of the most celebrated of the bistrot's dishes including quenelles au gratin with crayfish butter, artichoke hearts with truffled foie gras, and the house speciality, volaille truffée demi-deuil (truffled chicken in half-mourning). (Note: The Oxford English Dictionary defines "half-mourning" as "Attire in which the black of full mourning is relieved or replaced by white...") The dish consisted of a Bresse chicken poached in chicken stock, with slices of black truffle inserted under the skin. (When it was cooked, the truffle showed through the white skin of the chicken so that the overall appearance was black-and-white; hence the name.) She also learned how to cook various types of game such as larks, ortolans, and partridges, although they did not appear often in her menus once she had her own restaurant.

From the Bistrot Fillioux, Brazier moved to another restaurant in Lyon, the Brasserie du Dragon, where she was better paid. She remained there until 1921. In April that year, aged 26, she opened her first restaurant.

=== La Mère Brazier, Lyon ===
Brazier bought a vacant shop at 12 rue Royale in the first arrondissement of Lyon, on the opposite side of the Rhône from the Fillioux establishment. Her resources were limited: her capital was 12,000 francs (roughly equivalent to 9,200 euros in 2015 terms). With encouragement and advice from her former employer at the Dragon and the help of well disposed suppliers, she built up the business and began to attract regular customers. Her partner, Pierre, whom she never married, worked as a chauffeur during the day and in the evenings "swept the dining rooms, sharpened the knives and prepared the wine carafes". Initially, the restaurant could accommodate only 15 diners, but gradually Brazier increased the capacity, opening a second dining room and, later, a private salon and two small rooms upstairs.

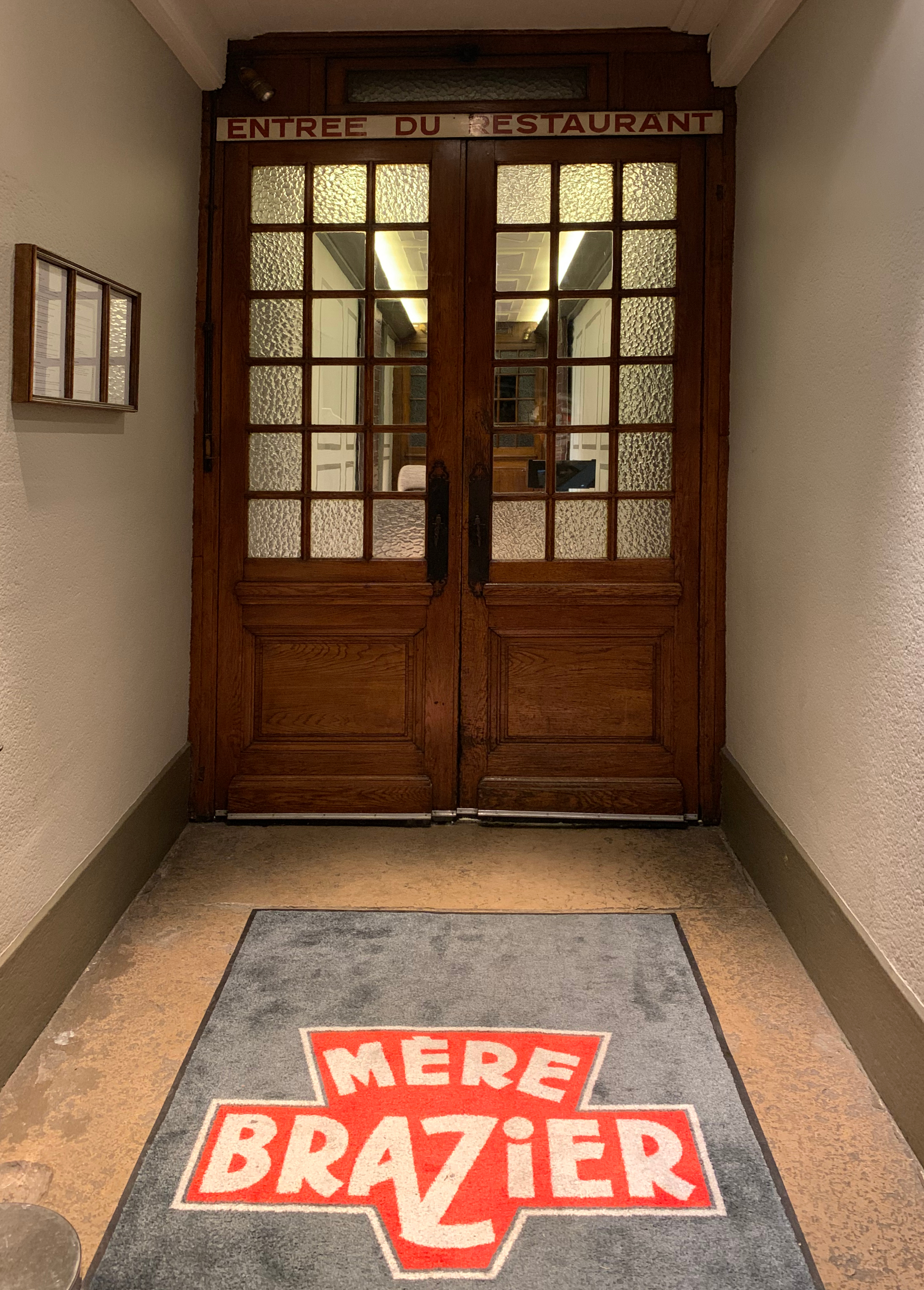
Entrance to the Restaurant La Mère Brazier, 12 rue Royale, Lyon (2019 photograph)

Fillioux died in 1925, and although her restaurant remained in business, Brazier was immediately seen as her successor. She first attracted notice beyond Lyon after the director of a motor-oil company dined at rue Royale and, impressed, asked her to supply a cold picnic for the participants in the company's car rally. The event was a success, and he invited Brazier to go to Paris every year to cook the firm's annual banquet for around 200 people. Among the dishes she provided were the quenelles and Fillioux's chicken dish with which Brazier's name became associated. According to the historian André Mure, "The whole world now marched to her place … for the great specialities with which her teacher had triumphed". By the late 1920s chefs elsewhere in France were offering La poularde pochée à la façon de la Brazier (Poached chicken in the Brazier style).

Brazier had a reputation for being demanding about the quality of her ingredients; her chicken supplier once joked that soon he would be expected to give the birds manicures before she would accept them. She was equally particular about cleanliness, emptying storage areas daily for cleaning. She hated waste, and would create staff dinners from trimmings and save anything left on diners' plates to feed her pigs. Her menu changed as required by seasonal availability. When there were few vegetables, she served a macaroni gratin with Gruyère cheese. The writer Joseph Wechsberg remembered her as "a formidable woman with a voice like a foghorn, rough language, and strong forearms". With regular customers she was known to take matters into her own hands: one recalled her telling him, "Mon petit, yesterday, you had the poule demi-deuil; tonight you'll have a quenelle!"

=== Col de la Luère ===
By the end of the 1920s Brazier was exhausted from the effort of building up her restaurant. She left her son, Gaston, in charge and retired temporarily to an old wooden chalet in the foothills of the Massif Central at Col de la Luère, Pollionnay, 17 kilometres (11 miles) from Lyon, and, in the words of the food writer Elizabeth David, "high above its notorious fogs and damp". As she started to feel better she began making light lunches for former customers that came to visit her, and gradually built up a second restaurant. The Restaurant Mère Brazier, Col de la Luère became the rural outpost of the Lyon original. Remembering the restaurant after Brazier's death, David described it:

Brazier at the Col de la Luère restaurant, 1930s

Airy and cool, surrounded by a large garden and much greenery, this was for a time my favourite restaurant in all France. The menu scarcely changed from year to year. With the exception of one dish of fish quenelles with a rather rich sauce, the food was all comparatively plain. There was no showing off, no fireworks. The calm confidence, the certitude that all here would be as it should which one felt upon entering the establishment was somehow communicated to her customers by Madame Brazier herself, invisible though she was in the kitchen, and by her front-of-the-house staff. ... The restaurant could have been in no country but France, the cooking practised by Madame Brazier and her brigade was the cooking of the French provinces at its best and also its most traditional.

In 1932 Brazier was awarded two stars in the Michelin Guide for each of her two restaurants. The following year, when the guide introduced three-star ratings for the first time, Brazier was the first chef to be awarded six stars, both her restaurants being rated of three-star quality. (Note: The Michelin three-star criterion in recent years has been "Remarkable cuisine, this restaurant is worth the trip. One always eats very well, sometimes wonderfully"; in earlier years it was "Memorable meals, the glory of French cooking, price has no meaning".) No other restaurateur was awarded this for another sixty-four years. (Note: Her achievement was finally equalled in 1997 by Alain Ducasse, and subsequently Marc Veyrat (2001), Thomas Keller (2006), Joël Robuchon (2012) and Yannick Alléno (2017). It is sometimes said that Brazier was the first woman to win three Michelin stars, but she shared that distinction with Marie Bourgeois, who was, like her, among the chefs so honoured in the 1933 guide. Marguerite Bise was the next, in 1951. After that there was a 56-year gap until the next female recipient of three stars, Anne-Sophie Pic, in 2007.)

=== War and post-war ===
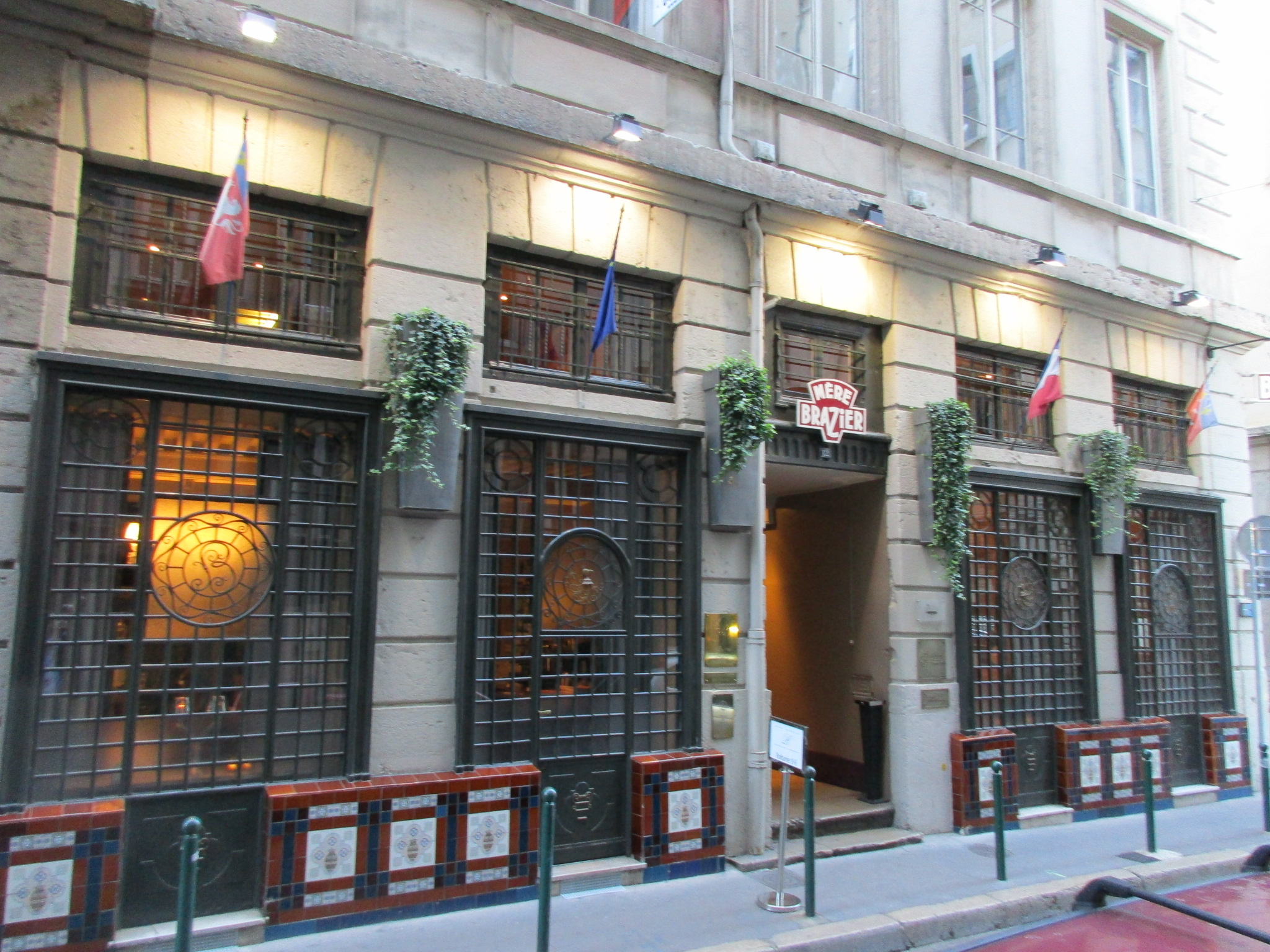
Exterior of La Mère Brazier, Lyon (2017 photograph)

Among Brazier's well-known customers was Édouard Herriot, mayor of Lyon and three times prime minister of France, who said, "She does more than I do to make the city famous." As an enemy of the Nazis and the puppet Vichy government, he was imprisoned during much of the Second World War, and under his collaborateur replacement Brazier fell foul of the authorities. She refused to compromise her standards and was repeatedly fined, and on one occasion imprisoned for a week, for breaching the Nazi occupiers' regulations about food rationing. In 1941 the regime ordered the closure of the rue Royale restaurant for buying food without the requisite authorisation.

When the war ended, Brazier held a celebratory feast at the Col for a large number of people from Lyon. She hired a band and a clown and her guests sang La Marseillaise during the banquet. The two establishments were restored to their pre-war eminence. From 1946 Brazier left Gaston in control of the rue Royal restaurant, where he, his wife, and later their daughter continued Brazier's traditions. Brazier concentrated her efforts on the Col de la Luère. Among the young chefs who learned their craft there were Paul Bocuse and Bernard Pacaud. Both contributed forewords paying tribute to their mentor in editions of her posthumously published recipe book, Les secrets de la Mère Brazier. Brazier's second-in-command at the Col de la Luère was Roger Garnier, husband of Odette, Brazier's niece; he was chef there for 20 years. Every February, accompanied by the Garniers, Brazier made what Drew Smith, in a biographical sketch, calls "note-gathering field trips" to other top restaurants in France, including Fernand Point's La Pyramide, Maison Pic and others.

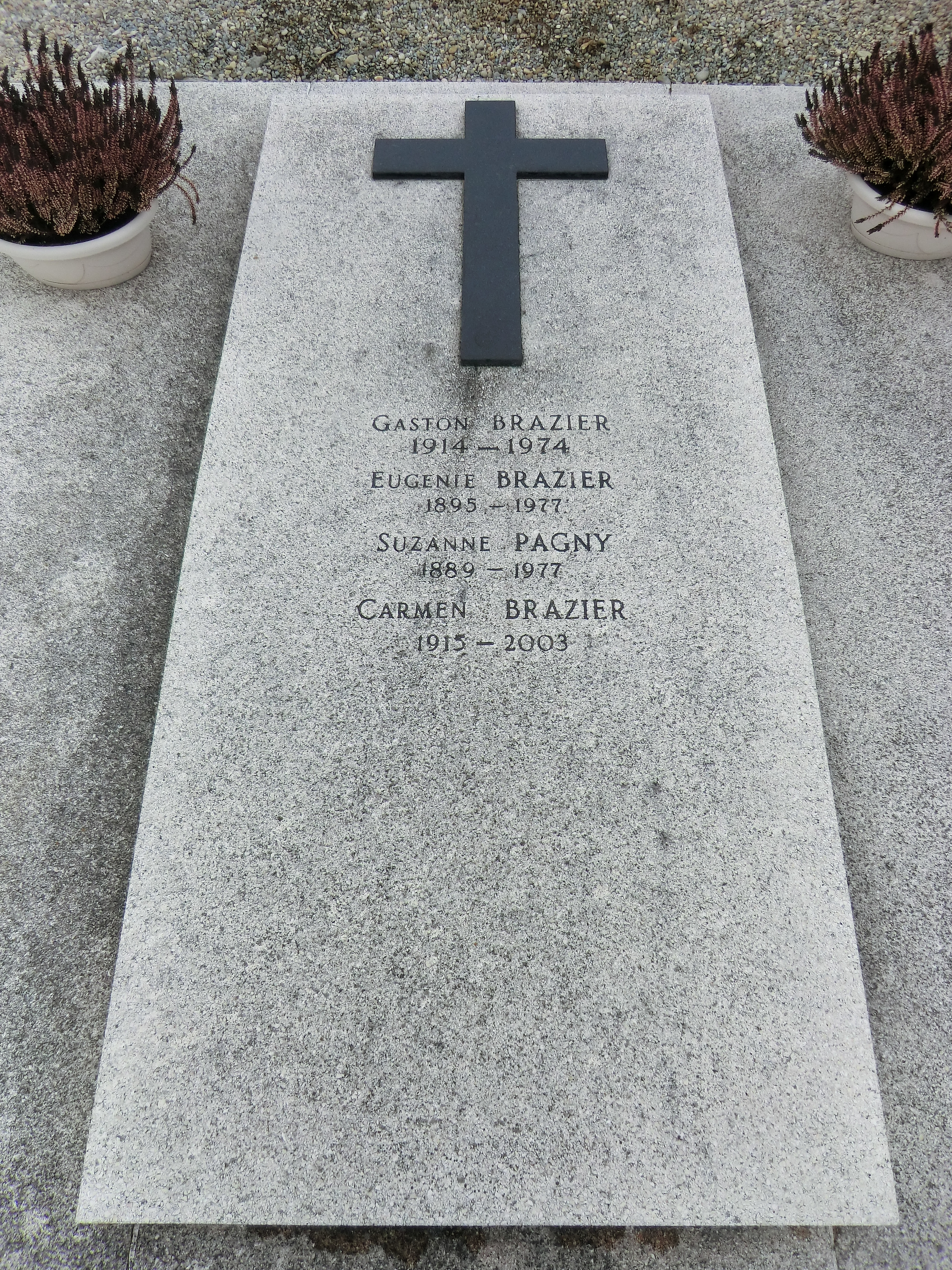
Brazier's grave, Mas Rillier cemetery, Miribel, Ain

The Michelin Guidereputations of the Col de la Luère establishment varied. The restaurant lost one of its three stars in 1960, Brazier resumed personal direction of the kitchen and three stars were restored in 1963. The third star was again withdrawn in 1968, when Brazier retired.

In 1968, aged 72, Brazier handed over management responsibilities to Gaston. In 1971 Jacotte Brazier, his daughter, joined the restaurant in the rue Royale, and succeeded him after his death in 1974. Brazier turned down the Légion d'honneur, the highest French order of merit, both military and civil, saying that it "should be given out for doing more important things than cooking well and doing the job as you're supposed to".

Brazier died on 2 March 1977 at the age of 81. The restaurant at Col de la Luère closed, but the rue Royale establishment continued under Jacotte until 2004. In 2008 the Michelin-starred chef Mathieu Viannay bought the restaurant, retaining its name, restoring the 1930s décor and featuring Brazier classics such as the volaille demi-deuil on the menu along with new dishes.

== Food ==
Although Brazier had a reputation for menus that changed little, her recipe book, begun in her last years and published after her death, contains more than 300 dishes. The editors intersperse the chapters with details of seven of her classic menus, illustrating her wide range. Starters included artichokes with foie gras, Belon oysters, house pâté, turbot cooked in Chambertin, salmon soufflé, artichokes with truffles, and grilled boudin with godiveau (veal forcemeat). Among the second courses are lobster with brandy and cream, smoked salmon, lobster with mayonnaise, and quenelles au gratin. The most prominently featured main course is Brazier's trademark chicken demi-deuil; others are roast pork, chicken with morels and cream, fillet steak Rossini, grilled chicken with béarnaise sauce, and poularde de Bresse poached en vessie (Note: En vessie means slowly poached in liquid, sealed in a pig's bladder.) with Riesling white wine. The larger courses are interspersed with dishes such as chicory salad, chestnuts and spinach in cream, or sautéed potatoes (as a course on their own). Desserts included ice cream bombe with fresh pineapple, peaches flambéed with Kirsch, fruit sorbet, Bresse galettes, and rum baba.

Elizabeth David recalled the food, like everything else chez la Mère Brazier, as "best described as of a sumptuous simplicity, but lighthearted and somehow all of a piece":

There was a salad, I remember, of artichoke hearts and walnuts, delicate and refreshing. Desserts changed no more than the main dishes. They consisted of fromage frais à la crème, an apple tart with pastry as thin as a plate, and the vanilla-flavoured ice cream of the house. I tried this once. It was a beauty. But the soft snowy fromage frais with fresh cream poured over it was even better. Whichever sweet one chose, with it there was always offered – and seldom refused – a slice of brioche-like confection, very light and spongey.

== Legacy ==
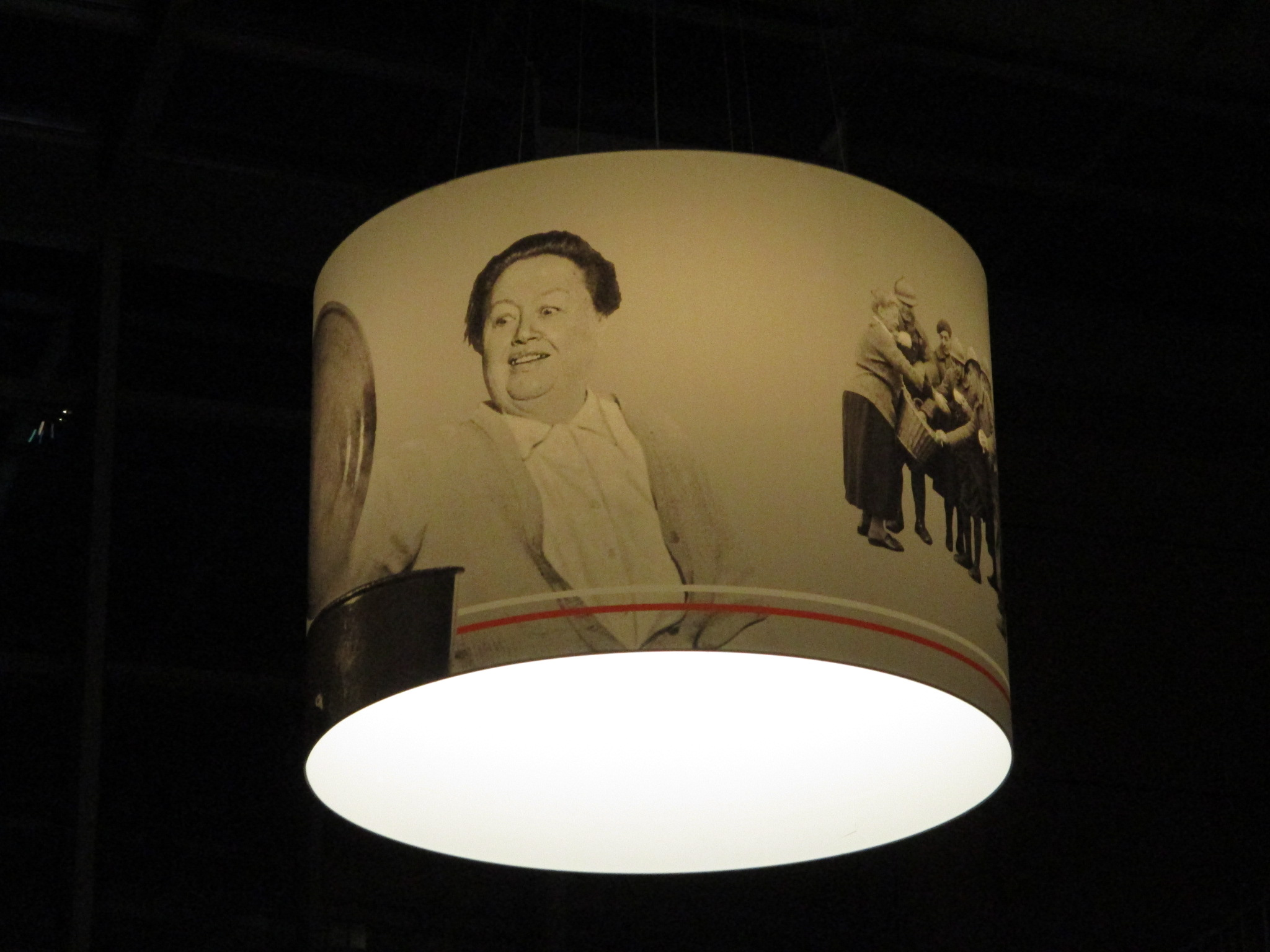
Brazier immortalised on a lampshade in the Halles de Lyon-Paul Bocuse (Paul Bocuse fresh food market in Lyon)

Brazier's customers included well known figures including Marlene Dietrich and Charles de Gaulle. For the influential food writer Curnonsky, "France's Prince of Gastronomy", Brazier was the greatest cuisinier in the world. Smith writes, "It is not going too far to say that her cuisine was the start of modern French gastronomy". In the same book, Bocuse calls her "one of the pillars of global gastronomy". Her death was marked by obituaries not only in the French press but in foreign papers; The New York Times and papers across the US carried articles, tribute was paid in the British press, and a Swiss paper observed that the gourmets of Lyon were in mourning.

Nonetheless, Brazier's accomplishments were largely forgotten outside France for many years. When Alain Ducasse received his sixth Michelin star in 1998, Florence Fabricant, food and wine writer for The New York Times, announced this as the first time any chef had received six stars. (Note: The paper later published a correction.) Papers elsewhere in the US and in Britain and Ireland made the same mistake. In 2016 Eater published a feature on Brazier, subheadlined, "How history erased this influential chef". The article observed that Quentin Crewe's 1978 book Great Chefs of France barely mentions her, and that the 2007 Food: The History of Taste, a collection of essays by French, German, Belgian, American, and British food historians, discusses Brazier's important contemporaries but does not mention her.

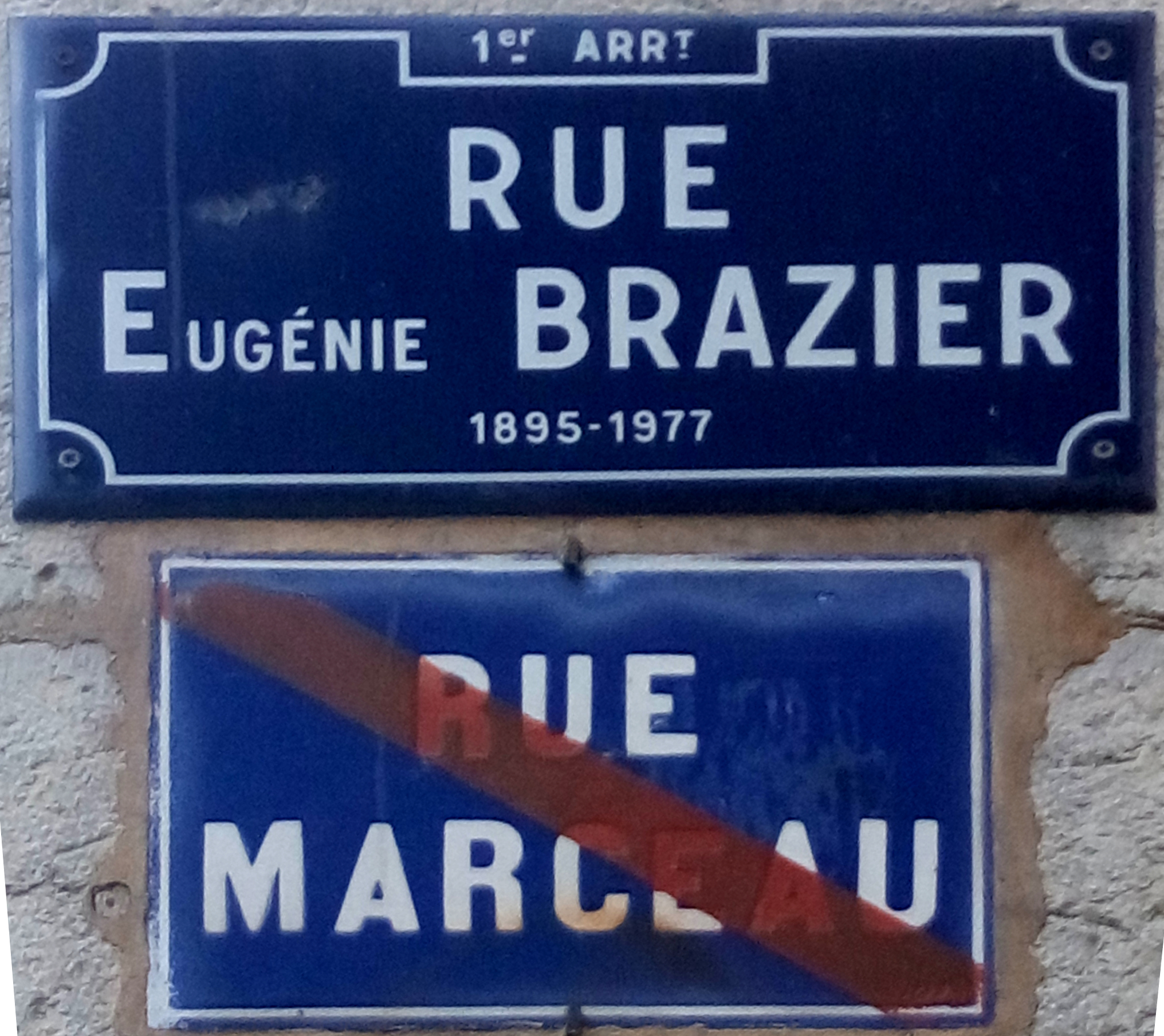
Lyon street near the restaurant, renamed in Brazier's honour in 2003

In France, Brazier was not forgotten. Her recipe book, published in 1977, went into a second edition in 1992 and a third in 2001. In 2003 the neighbouring street closest to the restaurant at 12 rue Royale was renamed rue Eugénie-Brazier by the Lyon City Council.

In 2007, thirty years after Brazier's death, Jacotte founded l'association des Amis d'Eugénie Brazier (the Association of Friends of Eugenie Brazier) to pay tribute to her grandmother. Bocuse and Pacaud sponsored the association. Its aim is to promote the careers of young women apprentices, guide and support them in 'the very masculine world of cooking' (univers très masculin de la cuisin) and pass on to them Brazier's professional values. The association supports young women trainees, paying tuition fees and funding training materials. The association also sponsors the annual Eugénie Brazier Literary Prizes, awarded to the female author of a cookbook (the Grand Prix), to an illustrator or photographer of a cookbook (Prix de l'Iconographie), a food-related novel or essay (Prix du Roman or l'Essai Gourmand) and a cookbook in the category "Francophone countries and elsewhere". The prizes and scholarships are awarded every year at the Lyon City Hall in December during the association's annual evening.

Brazier was commemorated by a Google Doodle on 12 June 2018, the 123rd anniversary of her birth. In a 2019 documentary about female chefs, The Heat: A Kitchen (R)evolution, the documentary filmmaker Maya Gallus focused on Brazier as the predecessor of the current generation of female chefs appearing in the film.

== Books by Brazier ==
- Les secrets de la mère Brazier, edited by Roger Moreau, with preface by Paul Bocuse:

- First edition (1977), Paris: Solar. ISBN 978-2-263-00145-1
- Second edition (1992), Paris: Solar. ISBN 978-2-263-01967-8
- Third edition (2001), Paris: Solar. ISBN 978-2-263-03121-2

- La Mère Brazier: The Mother of Modern French Cooking. English edition of Les secrets de la mère Brazier, with introduction and translation by Drew Smith, and additional preface by Bernard Pacaud.

- New York: Rizzoli (2014) ISBN 978-0-8478-4096-0
- London: Modern Books (2015) ISBN 978-1-906761-84-4

== Notes, references and sources ==
=== Sources ===
- Blanc, Georges (2001). Simple French Cooking: Recipes from Our Mothers' Kitchens. London: Weidenfeld & Nicolson. ISBN 978-0-304-35997-4.
- Boucheix, Bernard (2017). La Mère Fillioux: Lyonnaise. Triel-sur-Seine: Éditions Italique. ISBN 979-1-097-52703-7.
- Brazier, Eugénie; Moreau, Roger; Bocuse, Paul; Pacaud, Bernard (2015) [2004]. La Mère Brazier: The Mother of Modern French Cooking. Translated by Drew Smith. London: Modern Books. ISBN 978-1-906761-84-4. Introduction by Drew Smith.
- Burr, Rebecca, ed. (2011). Michelin: France 2011. Clermont-Ferrand: Michelin. ISBN 978-2-06-715350-9.
- Certeau, Michel de (1980). L'Invention du quotidien. Paris: Union générale d'éditions. ISBN 978-2-264-00268-6.
- David, Elizabeth (1986) [1984]. An Omelette and a Glass of Wine (second ed.). Harmondsworth: Penguin. ISBN 978-0-14-046721-5.
- David, Elizabeth (2008) [1960]. French Provincial Cooking (second ed.). London: Folio Society. OCLC 809349711.
- Escoffier, Auguste (1965) [1934]. Ma cuisine. London: Paul Hamlyn. ISBN 978-0-600-02450-7.
- Gambier, Gérald (2002). The Traditions of Lyon's Gastronomy. Translated by Edwige West. Châtillon-sur-Chalaronne: La Taillanderie. ISBN 978-2-87629-254-3.
- Gontard, Jacques (2001). Ecoute au vent. Lyon: Editions lyonnaises d'art et d'histoire. ISBN 978-2-84-147121-8.
- Ladonne, Jennifer; Linda Hervieux; Nancy Heslin (2013). Fodor's 2014 France. New York: Fodor's Travel. ISBN 978-0-7704-3241-6.
- Lichine, Alexis (1951). Wines of France. New York: Knopf. OCLC 1036924636.
- Moore, George (1924). Conversations in Ebury Street. London: William Heinemann. OCLC 561979645.
- Mure, André (1982). La Cuisine de Lyon. Paris: Stock. ISBN 978-2-234-01562-3.
- Smith, Drew (1990). Modern Cooking. London: Sidgwick & Jackson. ISBN 978-0-283-99997-0.
- Wechsberg, Joseph (1964). The Best Things in Life. Boston: Little, Brown. OCLC 1028728382.
