= Françoise Fillioux =

French chef (1865–1925)

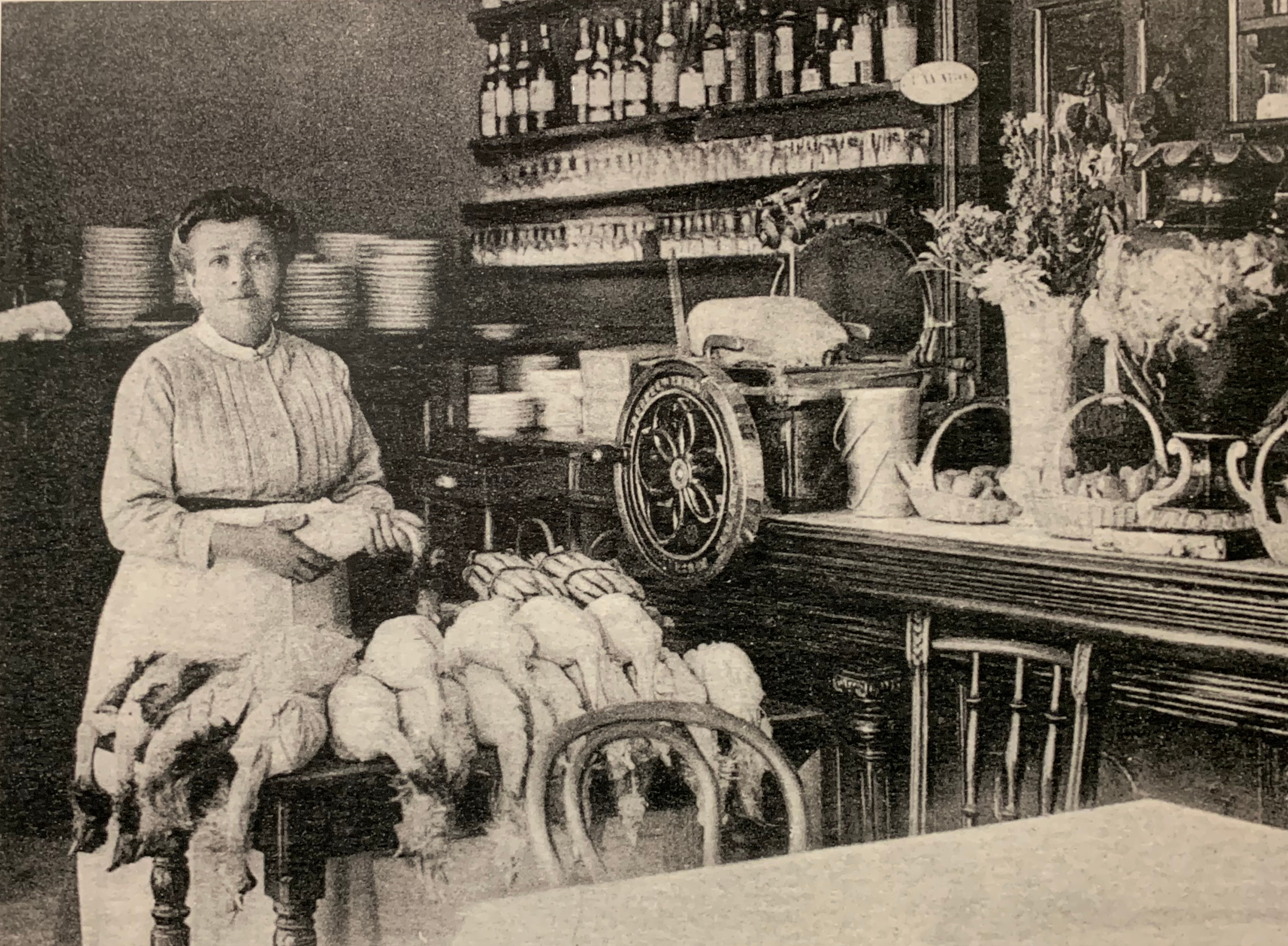
La Mère Fillioux in her restaurant kitchen with the chickens for her "volaille truffée demi-deuil"

Françoise Fillioux (or Filloux, (Note: The surname is spelled either as "Filloux" or "Fillioux" in contemporary and later publications. George Moore uses the shorter version in his Conversations in Ebury Street (1924), and it is so spelled in Elizabeth David's French Provincial Cooking (1960), Georges Blanc's Simple French Cooking: Recipes from Our Mothers' Kitchens (2001), the English edition of The Traditions of Lyon's Gastronomy by Gérald Gambier (2002) and in Drew Smith's translation of Les secrets de la Mère Brazier (2015). The longer form is used on the website of the Bibliothèque nationale de France, and by writers on the subject including Alexis Lichine (1951), Joseph Wechsberg (1964), Drew Smith (1990), and Bernard Boucheix (2017). The contemporary French press was similarly divided about the spelling: in Le Figaro she was Fillioux, in Paris-soir she was Filloux, and the trade paper La Toque blanche used both spellings of her name at various times. A commemorative plaque on the site of the bistro uses the longer spelling.) 2 September 1865 – 22 October 1925), known as "La Mère Fillioux" or "La Mère Filloux", was a French chef, proprietor of a famous restaurant in Lyon. Among her successors was Eugénie Brazier who worked in her kitchen as a young woman and continued her traditions of Lyonnaise cookery.

== Life and career ==
Françoise was born Benoîte Fayolle, on 2 September 1865 in the commune of Auzelles, in the Auvergne, into a large family. She went to work, first in Grenoble and then in Lyon, in bourgeois houses, including that of Gaston Eymard, a director of an insurance company and a dedicated gastronome. There, over the following ten years, she learned to cook to a high standard.

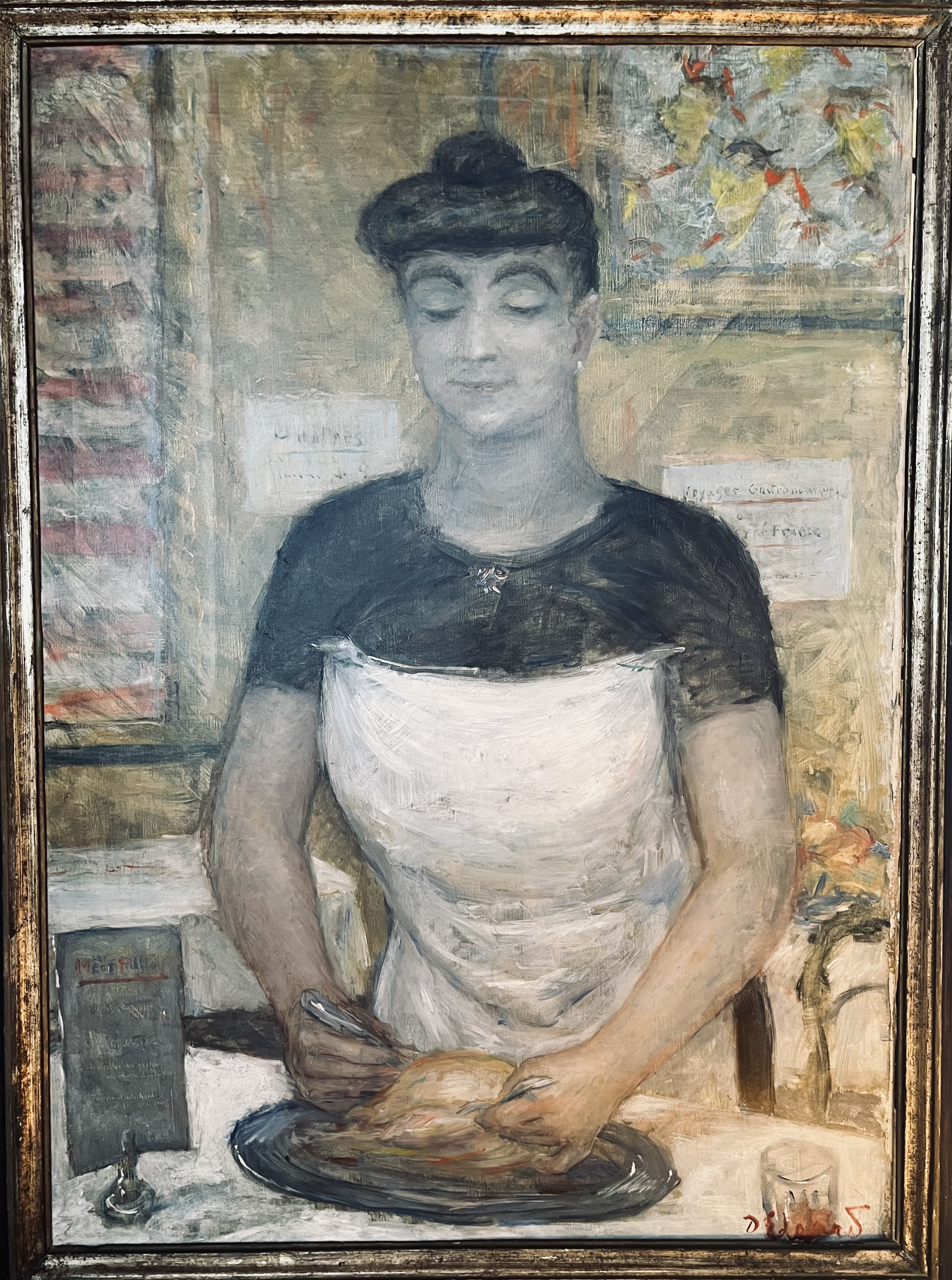
Fillioux, painted by Edzard Dietz, 1927

She married Louis Fillioux, whose father owned a building in the centre of Lyon. The couple opened a bistro there. From modest beginnings it became nationally, and to some extent internationally, famous. In a tribute published after her death, La Tribune asked rhetorically, "Who is the traveller, who is the tourist, who did not know La Mère Filloux in Lyon?"

It looked like the original bistro … the parquet floors, tables, plates, linen showed no refinement. But what was served there was such that no foreigner would have failed to make the pilgrimage to this distant quarter. Especially at the time of the "fairs" it was impossible to find a place there. The originality of the house was … to serve the same menu continuously since its opening. Each dish on this menu included truffles in its preparation. The soup was full of them: a very strong consommé, of which a huge terrine was placed on each table. Then came truffled dumplings, served directly as soon as they came out of the oven, still steaming and giving off an exquisite fragrance.

The menu varied more than the paper suggests – it included hors d'oeuvre of ham, sausage and galantine, quenelles au gratin with crayfish butter, and game in season – but was short and predictable. Some local people were reported as saying, "We only go there rarely, because however exquisite the food is, one cannot eat the same thing over and over again".

Fillioux became famous for her main course: "volaille truffée demi-deuil" (truffled chicken in half-mourning). (Note: The Oxford English Dictionary defines "half-mourning" as "Attire in which the black of full mourning is relieved or replaced by white...") The dish consisted of a Bresse chicken poached in chicken stock, with slices of black truffle inserted under the skin. (When it was cooked, the truffle showed through the white skin of the chicken so that the overall appearance was black-and-white; hence the name.) Fillioux would carve the chickens at the table, using only an ordinary table knife, a piece of culinary showmanship later practised by Eugénie Brazier, who trained under her.

After the chicken came the artichoke hearts with melted butter, on a large truffle base. The meal would conclude with pâtisserie, cheese or fruit.

In 1924, a year before Fillioux's death, the influential food writer Curnonsky, France's "Prince of Gastronomy", wrote, "She is as famous as Marechal Foch, Anatole France, Kipling, Chaplin, and Mistinguett. She is a great star and also a lovable Frenchwoman, one of the greatest Cordons Bleus on earth".

Fillioux died on 22 October 1925 at the age of 60. Her restaurant continued after her death, but her mantle was generally held to have been inherited by Brazier, who featured several of Fillioux's best-known dishes on her menus, most conspicuously the chicken "demi-deuil".

== Notes, references and sources ==
=== Sources ===
- Boucheix, Bernard (2017). La Mère Fillioux: Lyonnaise. Triel-sur-Seine: Éditions Italique. ISBN 979-1-097-52703-7.
- Brazier, Eugénie; Moreau, Roger; Bocuse, Paul; Pacaud, Bernard (2015) [2004]. La Mère Brazier: The Mother of Modern French Cooking. Translated by Drew Smith. London: Modern Books. ISBN 978-1-906761-84-4. Introduction by Drew Smith.
- David, Elizabeth (2008) [1960]. French Provincial Cooking (second ed.). London: Folio Society. OCLC 809349711.
- Escoffier, Auguste (1965) [1934]. Ma cuisine. London: Paul Hamlyn. ISBN 978-0-600-02450-7.
- Gambier, Gérald (2002). The Traditions of Lyon's Gastronomy. Translated by Edwige West. Châtillon-sur-Chalaronne: La Taillanderie. ISBN 978-2-87629-254-3.
- Lichine, Alexis (1951). Wines of France. New York: Knopf. OCLC 1036924636.
- Moore, George (1924). Conversations in Ebury Street. London: William Heinemann. OCLC 561979645.
- Smith, Drew (1990). Modern Cooking. London: Sidgwick & Jackson. ISBN 978-0-283-99997-0.
- Wechsberg, Joseph (1964). The Best Things in Life. Boston: Little, Brown. OCLC 1028728382.
- Wechsberg, Joseph (1978). "Lyonnais and Bresse". Gourmet France. New York: Gourmet Books. OCLC 4512394.
