= Marguerite Bise =

French chef (1898–1965)

- Born: Marguerite Valentine Sautureau; 8 August 1898; Paris, France
- Died: 21 May 1965 (aged 66); Talloires, Haute-Savoie, France
- Culinary career
- Cooking style: French cuisine
- Rating: * Michelin stars
- Current restaurant: * Auberge du Père Bise

Marguerite Valentine Bise (French pronunciation: [maʁɡəʁit biz]; née Sautureau; 8 August 1898 – 21 May 1965) was a French chef and restaurateur at her restaurant Auberge du Père Bise in Talloires, Haute-Savoie, France. In 1951, she became the third woman to win three Michelin stars.

== Biography ==
Marguerite married Marius Bise, the son of Francois and Marie Bise. The couple had opened a guinguette in Talloires, Haute-Savoie, France. Under the management of Marguerite and Marius, it was expanded and renamed Auberge du Père Bise. Marguerite was the head chef, and created dishes such as crayfish gratin, and Bresse chicken served with tarragon. During the 1930s, Marguerite became one of the best known French chefs, alongside Alexandre Dumaine, Fernand Point and fellow female chef Eugénie Brazier.

With both Brazier and Marie Bourgeois winning three Michelin stars in 1933, Bise would also win this acclaim in 1951 becoming the third woman to do so. The 1951 guide was the first one issued following the end of the Second World War. These three female chefs were referred to as the "Lyon Grandmothers"; it was more than fifty years before a fourth female chef won three Michelin stars when Anne-Sophie Pic gained them in 2007.

== Family and legacy ==
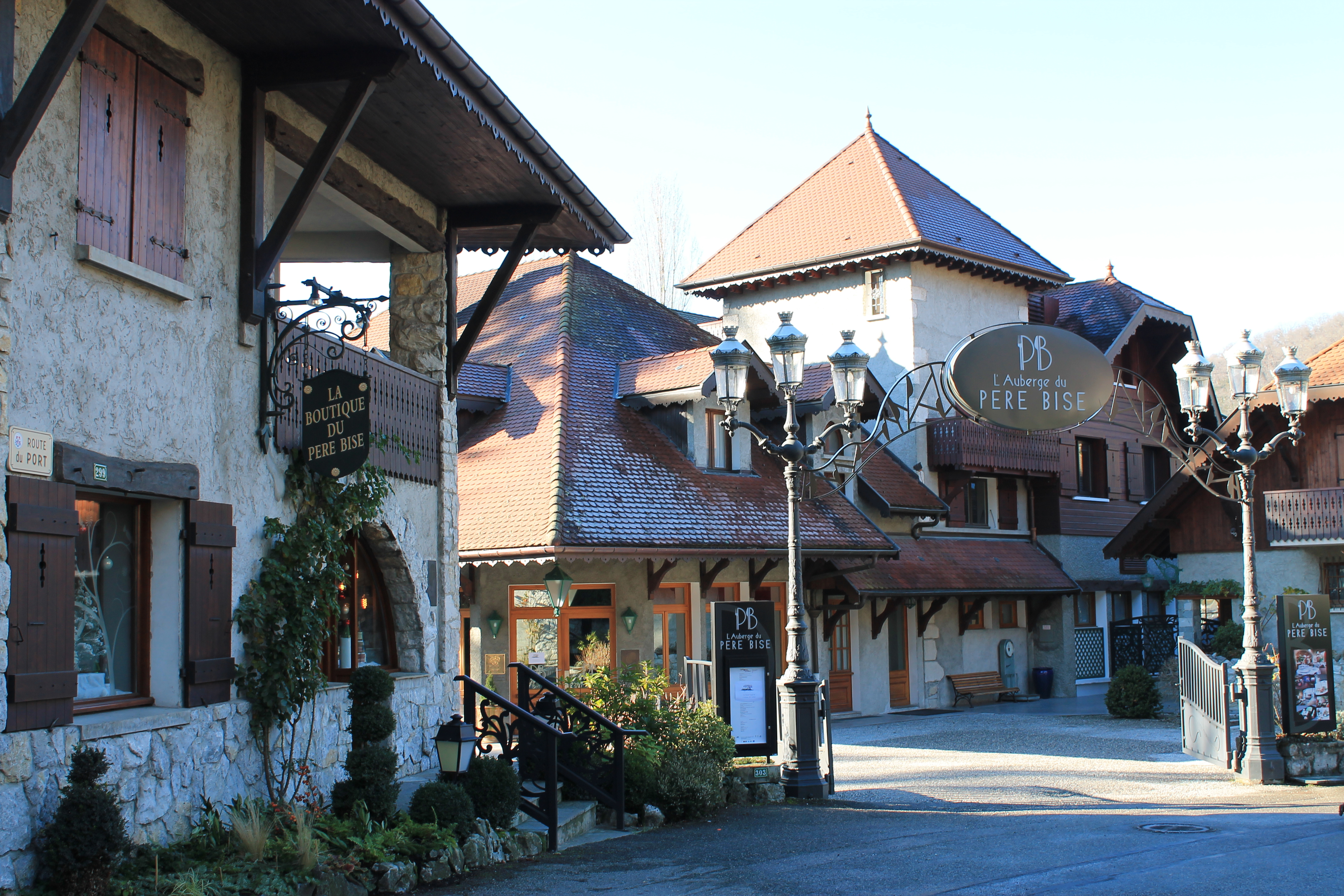
The restaurant Auberge du père Bise

Following her death, her son Francois Bise became head chef at Auberge du Père Bise. He once again won three stars for the restaurant during the 1970s. The restaurant remained in the family for a further generation, when Marguerite's granddaughter Sophie Bise became head chef. It was then purchased by French chef Jean Sulpice, who aimed to serve a new menu influenced by Marguerite's dishes.
