= List of Université libre de Bruxelles people =

This list of notable people associated with Université libre de Bruxelles includes faculty, staff, graduates and former students in the undergraduate program and all graduate programs, and others affiliated with the university. Individuals are sorted by category and alphabetized within each category. The "Affiliation" fields in the tables in this list indicate the person's affiliation with the ULB and use the following notation:

- B indicates a bachelor's degree
- Att indicates that the person attended the undergraduate program but may not have graduated
- AM indicates a Master of Arts degree
- MSE indicates a Master of Science in Engineering degree awarded by the School of Engineering and Applied Science
- PhD indicates a Ph.D. degree
- GS indicates that the person was a graduate student but may not have received a degree
- F indicates a faculty member, followed by years denoting the time of service on the faculty
- Rec indicates a Rectors of Université libre de Bruxelles, followed by years denoting the time of service

== Politics and government ==
- Gia Abrassart, Belgo-Congolese journalist and activist
- Vũ Đức Đam (b. 1963), Vietnamese politician, Deputy Prime Minister
- Aleth Félix-Tchicaya (b. 1955), Congolese writer
- Germaine Marie-Thérèse Hannevart (1887–1977), Belgian teacher and peace campaigner
- Fradique de Menezes (b. 1942), São Toméan politician, President
- Charles Michel (b. 1975), politician, Prime Minister and President of the European Council

== Science and technology ==
- Antonina Grégoire (1914–1952), business engineer, feminist, communist, Partisans Armés resistance member and politician
- Delphine Lannuzel, PhD, sea ice biogeochemist and Antarctic researcher
- André Sterling (1924–2018), civil engineer and professor emeritus
- Stephane de Baets (b. 1969), investment, real estate, and hospitality entrepreneur.
- Marguerite Massart (1900–1979), first Belgian female engineer
- Anne Goldberg, physicist, Research & Innovation Expert at Solvay
- Frédérique Vanholsbeeck, professor of physics

== Nobel laureates ==
Year	Image	Laureate	Relation	Category	Rationale
1913		Henri La Fontaine	PhD (1876)	Peace	"for being the true leader of the popular peace movement in Europe."
1919		Jules Bordet	PhD (1892), Professor (1907–1961)	Medicine	"for his discoveries relating to immunity".
1974		Albert Claude Co-recipient with Christian de Duve and George Palade	Professor (1949–1971)	Medicine	"for their discoveries concerning the structural and functional organization of the cell".
1977		Ilya Prigogine	Professor (1950–2003)	Chemistry	"for his contributions to non-equilibrium thermodynamics, particularly the theory of dissipative structures"
2013		François Englert Co-recipient with Peter Higgs	PhD (1958), Professor (1964–2016)	Physics	"for the theoretical discovery of a mechanism that contributes to our understanding of the origin of mass of subatomic particles, and which recently was confirmed through the discovery of the predicted fundamental particle"
2018		Denis Mukwege Co-recipient with Nadia Murad	PhD (2015)	Peace	"for their efforts to end the use of sexual violence as a weapon of war and armed conflict"

== Faculty ==
- Eugene Goblet d'Alviella (1846–1925), historian and politician
- Jules Bordet (1870–1961), physician, laureate of the 1919 Nobel Prize in Physiology or Medicine
- Albert Claude (1899–1983), biologist, laureate of the 1974 Nobel Prize in Physiology or Medicine
- Théophile de Donder (1872–1957), physicist, mathematician, and father of irreversible thermodynamics
- Paul Hymans (1865–1941), politician and first President of the League of Nations
- Ilya Prigogine (1917–2003), physicist and chemist, laureate of the 1955 Francqui Prize and of the 1977 Nobel Prize in Chemistry
- Jacques Tits (1930–2021), Belgian-French mathematician, laureate of the 1993 Wolf Prize and of the 2008 Abel Prize
- Emile Vandervelde (1866–1938), statesman, socialist leader, Minister of Justice, and Minister of Foreign Affairs
- Éliane Vogel-Polsky (1926–2015), lawyer and feminist
