= Ma Gastronomie =

- First edition (French)
- Author: Fernand Point
- Language: French
- Subject: Culinary Arts
- Genre: non-fiction
- Publisher: Overlook/Rookery (October 30, 2008); Xs books
- Publication date: 1969
- Publication place: France
- Media type: book
- Pages: 240
- ISBN: 1585679615

Ma Gastronomie is a modern French cuisine cookbook created from the notes of legendary French chef Fernand Point. It was first published in French in 1969. 200 recipes are included based on Fernand Point's notes and handwritten recipes.

The book has detailed sections on Fernand Point, La Pyramide (the restaurant), his cuisine, wines, spirits, etc.

== English edition ==
The first English edition of the book was published in 1974. In its second English edition published in 2008 by Rookery publishers, the foreword is by noted American chef of The French Laundry restaurant Thomas Keller. He has cited Point's work as being very significant to his training in his introduction to Ma Gastronomie.

== Reviews ==
The world-famous chef Charlie Trotter described Point's Ma Gastronomie as the most important cookbook:

If someone were to take away all my cookbooks except for one, I would keep Fernand Point’s Ma Gastronomie. For me, his philosophy instilled what cuisine is all about: generosity and hugeness of heart. Point said that if you are not a generous person you cannot be in this field. I think you’ll notice that chefs, as a whole, say yes to any project, fundraiser, or tasting because they have such a generous spirit.
