= Rue Royale, Lyon =

Thoroughfare in Lyon, France

Coordinates: 45°46′17″N 4°50′14″E

Rue Royale
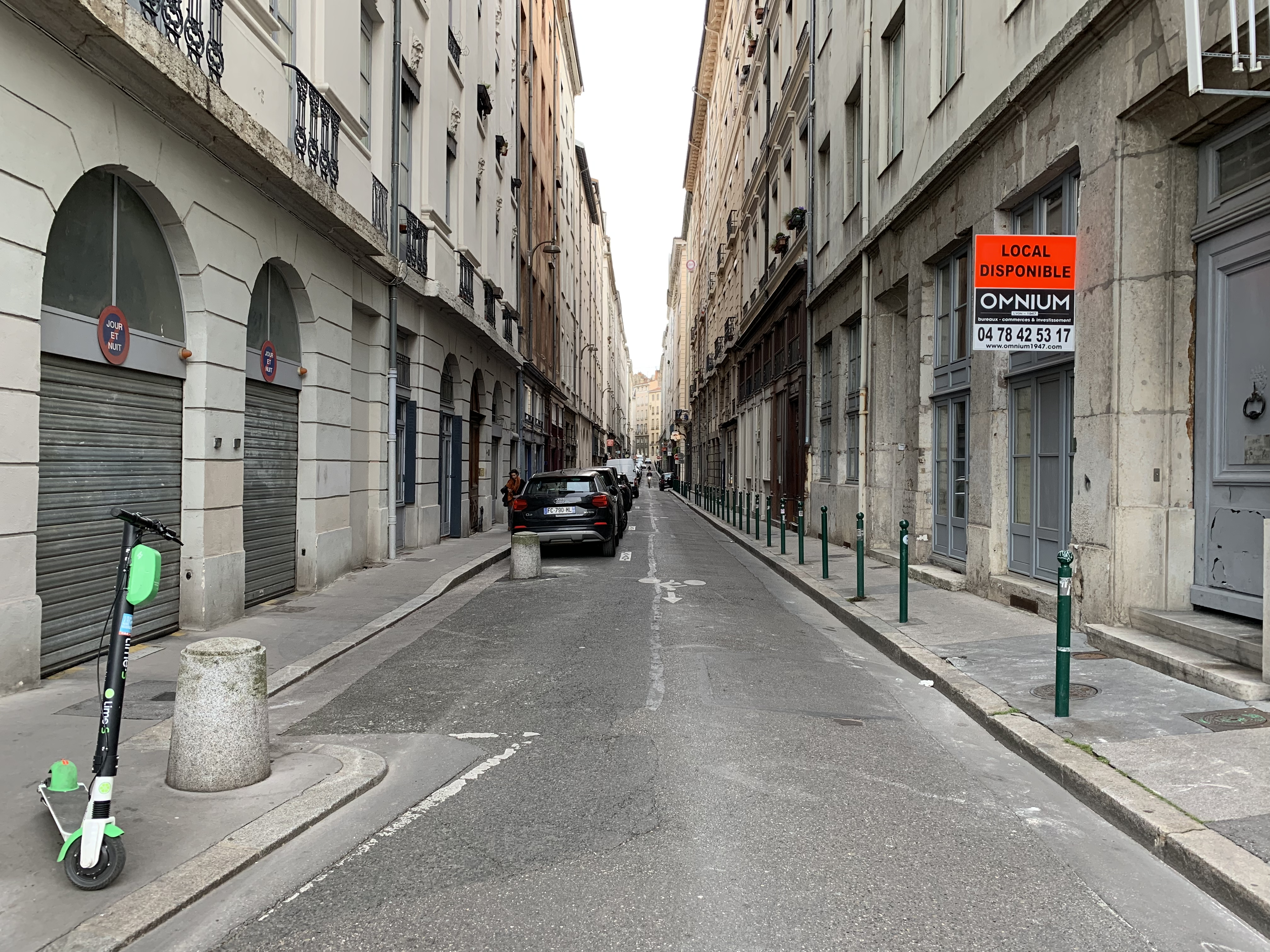
- Former name(s): Rue de la Convention; Rue de la Démocratie; Rue Nationale
- Type: Street
- Location: 1st arrondissement of Lyon, Lyon, France
- Postal code: 69001

Construction
- Construction start: 18th century

The Rue Royale (French pronunciation: [ʁy ʁwajal]) is a street located in the 1st arrondissement of Lyon and was the main street of the quarter when it was created. It starts between the Place Servetus and the Rue de Provence and ends by joining the Grande Rue des Feuillants. There are many traboules closed which link the street with the Quai Lassagne and the Rue d'Alsace-Lorraine. It is served by line C of the metro (Croix-Paquet station).

== History ==
When it was opened in 1870 after filling and construction, the Rue Royale was the main and the nicer street of the Tolozan quarter created by Soufflot, the other streets being the Rue Dauphine, Rue de Berri and Rue de Provence. Many wealthy merchants began to live in the street and many restaurants opened. Originally, the street was a little longer, but the north was demolished in the mid-20th century with the goal of allowing the exit of the Tunnel de la Croix-Rousse. At the entrance of the street, there was a famous bathhouse called "Le Clavecin", built by Gary. After the death of French King Louis XIV, the street was named Rue de la Convention, then in 1848 Rue de Démocratie for a short while, and Rue Nationale in 1850.

In 1792, Mayor of Lyon Antoine Nivière-Chol (1744-1817) lived in the street. Musicologist and Chopin biographer Édouard Ganche (1880-1945) lived at number 5 from the mid-1920s to his death. He had there one of the most important private collection of Chopin-related objects in the world at this time.

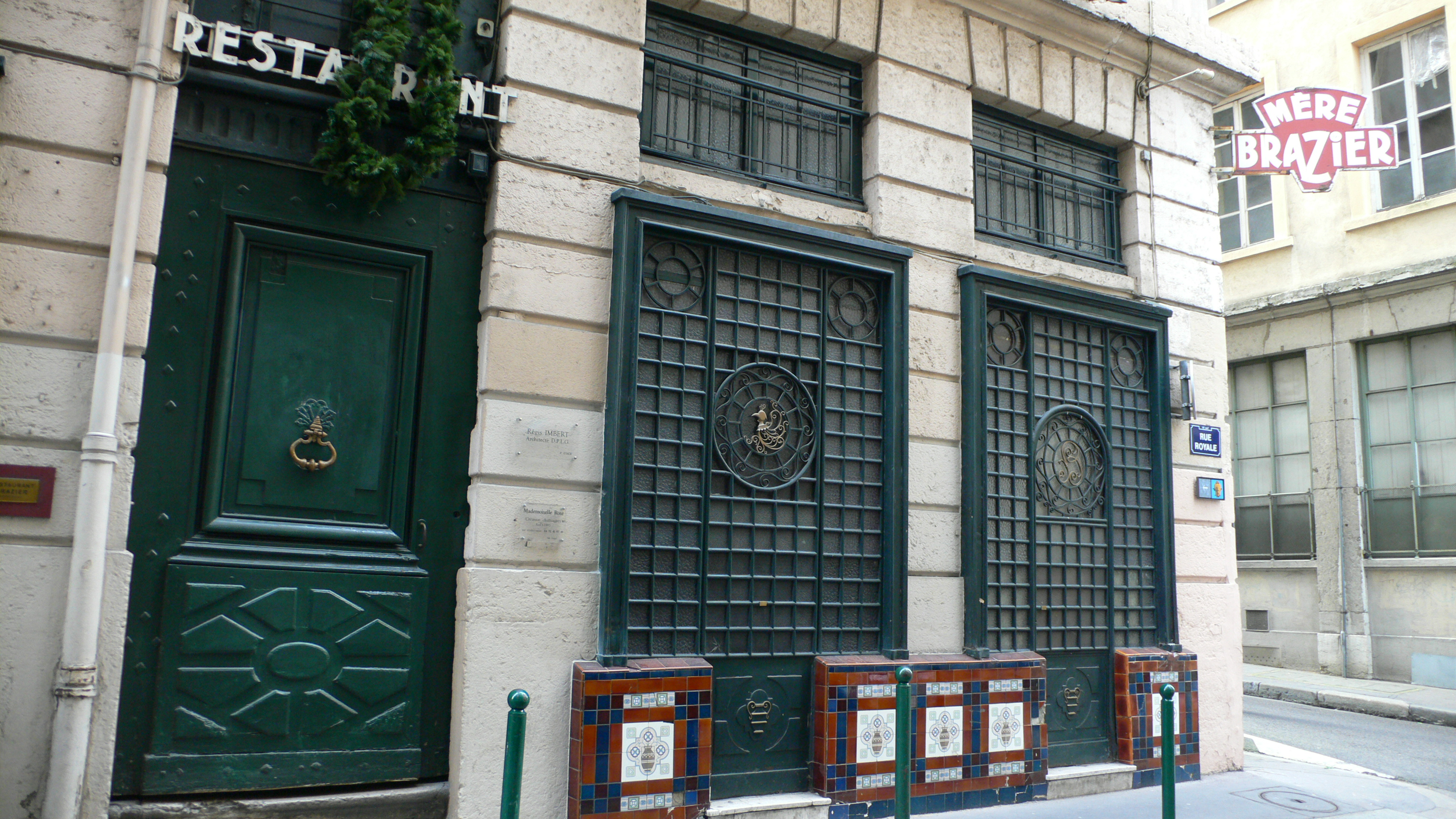
The restaurant of the "Mère Brazier", at No. 12

There is a famous restaurant La Mère Brazier once owned by the "Mère Brazier" a.k.a. Eugénie Brazier (1895–1977), a country girl who was born in La Tranclière, Ain and arrived in Lyon in 1914. She opened the restaurant at No. 12 in 1921 and became the first three-star female chef awarded by Michelin (from 1933 to 1939). In 2007, the restaurant was bought by Mathieu Viannay and reopened in 2008.

== Architecture ==
The Rue Royale is lined by five-floor buildings and houses made of solid gray stone. There are several big doors; most of them are painted. The last building, at the west, has only one floor with a roof terrace.

An architecture firm located in the street has the same name as that of the street: Rue Royale Architects. There are a nightclub and the Théâtre de l'Anagramme.

== Traboules ==
There are 14 traboules in the street; most of them are open (Nos. 5, 7, 11, 19 and 23 are closed but can be visited; Nos. 11, 29, 31 and 33 are curved, others are straight):

- The No. 5 has three entrances and a particular architecture which includes five medallions, stained glass doors, many heads of old people and crouching lions carved, ancient lanterns and painted vases.
- The No. 7 includes workshops of architecture.
- At the No. 11, there are three metal balconies and plants in the courtyard.
- At No. 15, there is a triangular courtyard with three balconies.
- The No. 17 begins with a large door.
- At No. 21, the entrance is high and the restored courtyard has two columns.
- The gate of No. 23 dates from the eighteenth century.
- The restored courtyard of Nos. 25-27 ends with a large door with a repainted facade.
- At No. 29, there is a high fountain with a disused pendulum topped by a Virgin and Child.
- The No. 31 has a small glassed courtyard and ends under stone balconies.
- The Louis XVI-styled entrance of No. 33 is highly decorated.
