= Mathieu Pacaud =

French chef

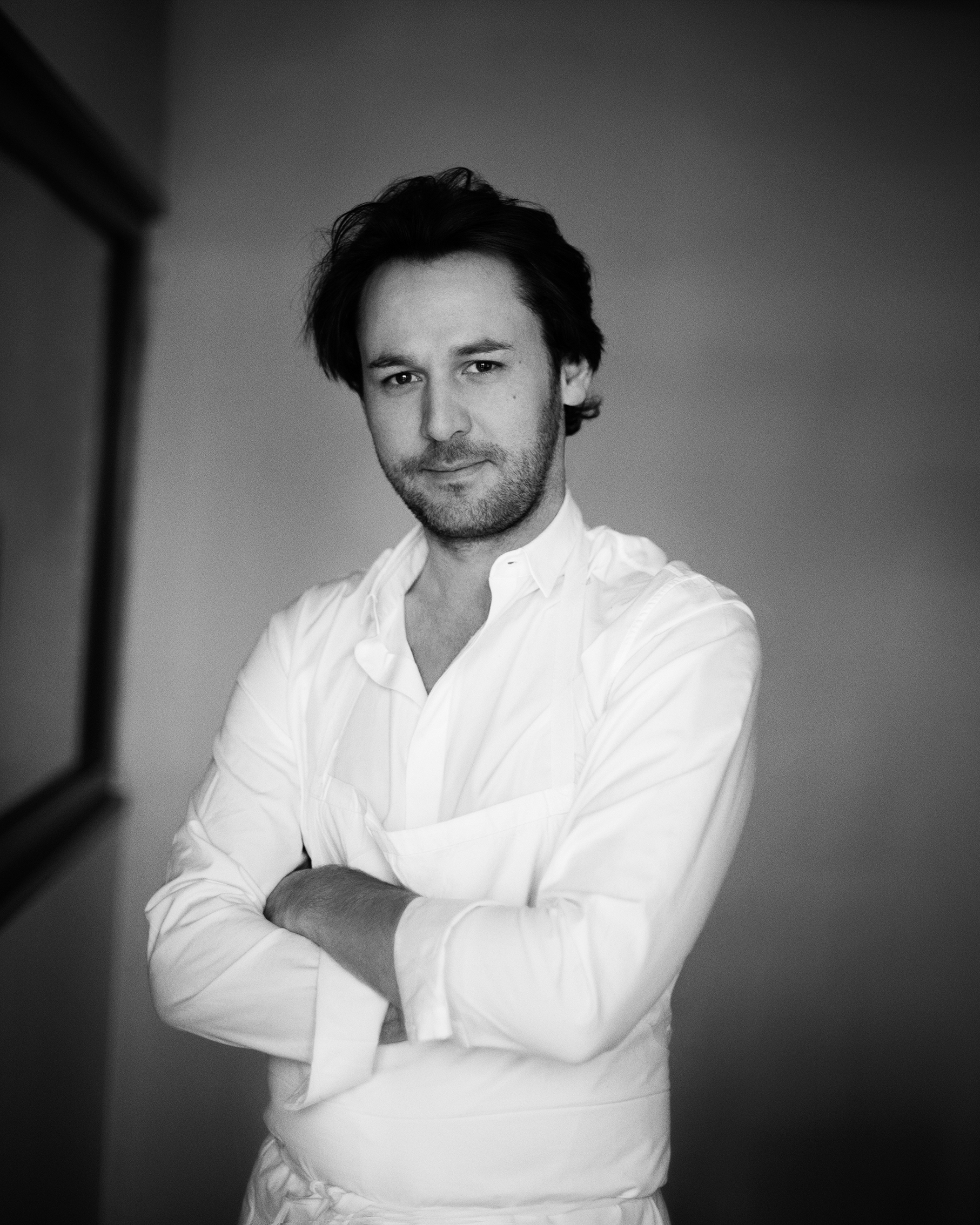
- Born: January 1, 1981 (age 45); Paris
- Occupation: Chef

Mathieu Pacaud (French pronunciation: [matjø pako]; born January 1, 1981) is a French chef, running the restaurants Divellec, Hexagone, Histoires and L'Ambroisie

== Biography ==
Mathieu Pacaud is the son of Danièle Pacaud and the starred chef Bernard Pacaud. He grew up in the middle of the most renowned places of high gastronomy, influenced by his father, head chef of the gastronomic restaurant L'Ambroisie, in Paris. The Corsican roots of his mother has an influence on his cooking.

When he was 15 years old, Mathieu Pacaud started his career at the renowned two Michelin-starred restaurant Le Jamin, located in the 16th district of Paris. He stayed for two years under the direction of the famous French chef Benoît Guichard, before joining the luxurious Plaza Athénée, as a chef de partie. At 20, he decided to leave his home country for Beirut, Lebanon, where he ran one, and eventually five French restaurants. When he went back to France in 2003, he began working with his father, the chef Bernard Pacaud, who holds three Michelin stars since 1988 at L'Ambroisie. In only six years, Mathieu Pacaud worked his way up the ladder until he reached the position of Chef, alongside his father, heading L'Ambroisie. They now run the restaurant and co-create the menu.

He then created MBP Conseil, his consulting company. He first opened Hexagone in January 2015, a fusion of a cocktail bar and a contemporary restaurant. A few months later, he created Histoires, a restaurant at Hexagone. Only a year after the restaurants’ opening, the Michelin guide attributed one star to Hexagone and two stars to Histoires, a historic performance in the history of the Michelin. Mathieu Pacaud then began to work on two new projects. First, the rebirth of Divellec, one of the most famous seafood restaurants in Paris. Second, the creation of L’Ambroisie Macau in Asia, directly inspired by its Parisian namesake, and located in the hotel/casino complex "The 13" developed by Stephen Hung. The restaurant Divellec opened in September 2016, while the opening of L’Ambroisie Macau is expected in December 2016.

During the summer of 2016, he opened a pop-up restaurant based in the Domaine de Murtoli, in South Corsica.

== Projects ==
Mathieu Pacaud is working on duplicating the restaurant L'Ambroisie in Macau, inside the hotel/casino complex « The 13 ». The opening is expected in December 2016.

== Restaurants ==
=== L’Ambroisie ===
Mathieu Pacaud is, alongside his father, at the head of L'Ambroisie, three Michelin stars.

=== Hexagone ===
In December 2014, Mathieu Pacaud opened the restaurant Hexagone. It received one Michelin star in February 2016.

=== Histoires ===
In May 2015, Mathieu Pacaud opened Histoires, an 18-seat gastronomic restaurant.

=== Divellec ===
In 2015, Mathieu Pacaud acquired the Divellec, a renowned Parisian restaurant dedicated to seafood. It opened in September 2016.

=== La Ferme de Murtoli ===
In July 2016, Mathieu Pacaud opened La ferme de Murtoli, a gastronomic restaurant based in the Domaine de Murtoli, (Sartène, Corsica). The restaurant is opened from May 15 until September 15.

== Awards ==
Mathieu Pacaud was awarded in 2016 one star for his restaurant Hexagone and two stars for his restaurant Histoires. He is the first French chef to have obtained three Michelin stars in a row. Mathieu Pacaud was made Knight of the French National Order of Merit in 2016

== Bibliography ==
L’Ambroisie – Bernard et Mathieu Pacaud, Philippe Rossat et Jacques Gavard Mathieu Pacaud and his father, Bernard Pacaud, wrote « L’Ambroisie » - the official cookbook dedicated to the mythical restaurant.

== Anecdotes ==
On November 30, 2015, Mathieu Pacaud and his father, Bernard Pacaud, hosted the American President Barack Obama and the French President François Hollande at L'Ambroisie.
