= Stephane De Baets =

Belgian investment, real estate, and hospitality entrepreneur

- Born: April 6, 1969 (age 57); Belgium
- Education: Université Libre de Bruxelles
- Occupations: Founder and President of Elevated Returns (Aspen St. Regis Resort), founder and owner of Chefs Club
- Known for: Blockchain-based real estate investing Hospitality industry
- Spouse: Sabrina Huls

Stephane De Baets (born April 6, 1969) is a Belgian investment, real estate, and hospitality entrepreneur. He is founder and president of the international asset management firm Elevated Returns, which controls the Aspen St. Regis Resort in Aspen, Colorado and other commercial properties in the United States, Europe, and Southeast Asia.

He is also the founder and owner of Chefs Club, a restaurant group that features a rotating residency of chefs from around the world.

De Baets is a pioneer in blockchain-based real estate investing. Through his firm Elevated Returns, he facilitated the first major commercial real estate transaction using blockchain technology to sell ownership stakes in the Aspen St. Regis Resort.

He was also formerly part-owner of OptAsia Capital, a Bangkok-based investment firm founded in 2008, until he divested in 2018.

He recently acquired the historic Redstone Castle in Redstone Colorado. He plans on transforming the legendary Castle into the flagship USA location of Bangkok-based RAKxa Medical Spa.

== Background ==
De Baets was born and raised in Belgium. He holds a bachelor's degree in business management and a master's degree in management sciences, finance and marketing from the Solvay Business School of Management at the Université libre de Bruxelles.

He began his career in Europe as an auditor with the European Community and spent many years as an investment banker based in Bangkok, Thailand. before relocating to New York in 2013 and then Aspen, Colorado in 2019.

== Business ==
=== Elevated Returns ===
De Baets is the founder and president of Elevated Returns, a hospitality-centric asset management company based in Aspen The firm's portfolio of Class A real estate investment assets, which include properties in the United States, Southeast Asia and Europe, are collectively valued at more than US$1 billion.

The firm is a pioneer in digitizing traditional financial assets using blockchain-based technology. In 2018, Elevated Returns launched the first major digital tokenization of a commercial real estate asset with the St. Regis Aspen Resort. In February 2019, Elevated Returns announced plans to digitize its entire portfolio of real estate assets using the blockchain technology Tezos. The digital offerings will be made available to accredited investors on the Securitize platform.

In March 2019, De Baets acquired 21.4% of Seamico Securities ZMICO (BKK) and repositioned it as a fully integrated fintech play in South East Asia offering blockchain digital assets solutions to traditional finance. Following the repositioning, Seamico Securities is being renamed XSPRING Capital and now trades under (XPG.Bk0

De Baets also founded ERX, a fully regulated digital assets exchange in Thailand.

=== Aspen St. Regis Resort ===
De Baets is a majority controller of the Aspen St. Regis Resort in Aspen, Colorado, through the single-asset trust Aspen Digital Inc., which operates as a subsidiary of Elevated Returns. He purchased the property through Elevated Returns in 2010. The resort is located at the base of Aspen Mountain.

In 2018, after a failure to list it as an asset REIT it was announced that Aspen St. Regis would serve as the backing asset for a digital tokenization offering allowing accredited investors to take minority ownership stakes in the property through a blockchain-based technology. The offering was the first major digital tokenization of a commercial real estate asset. To facilitate the digital tokenization of the Aspen St. Regis Resort, De Baets established Aspen Digital Token, also known as Aspen Coin, in 2018. This venture used the blockchain technology Ethereum to sell 18 million digital securitized tokens representing ownership stakes in the Aspen St. Regis Resort. Each of the 18 million tokens were valued at $1, together representing an 18.9 percent ownership stake in the Aspen St. Regis. Elevated Returns maintained control of the other 81.9 percent.

The sale of the tokens was administered on the digital asset platform Templum Markets. Elevated returns initially worked with SolidBlock to issue the digital security under the name Aspen Coin using Ethereum smart contract. Aspen Digital Token later migrated to the Securitize platform and was to start trading in October 2019 in multiple exchanges. The tokens effectively operate as shares in the property.

De Baets has stated that the tokenization strategy allows for "the democratization of the investing process" by removing middlemen. Because it is based on blockchain technology, computers are able to independently verify ledgers and other transaction records associated with the sale of the tokens, which removes layers of intermediaries that would otherwise be paid in a transaction.

The blockchain-based offering has also been heralded as a blueprint for future real estate transactions, as it holds the potential to reduce financial reliance on authoritative institutions like banks, courts or governments to referee transactions and property ownership.

In December 2021, Snow Lodge Aspen opened at the Aspen St. Regis Resort.

=== Chefs Club ===
In 2012, De Baets launched the restaurant group Chefs Club inside the St. Regis Resort in Aspen, Colo.

Chefs Club launched a second location in New York City in 2014, followed by a fast-casual location called Chefs Club Counter in 2017. The group has been called an innovator in the industry. At first, Chefs Club featured full nightly menus from a rotating cast of nearly 200 prominent chefs from around the world.

In 2017, the restaurant group transitioned from its nightly menu and visiting chef format to a residency program, in which a different chef assumes complete creative control of the space and menu at one of its three locations for months at a time. In 2020 the COVID-19 pandemic affected the viability of The Chefs Clubs in New York and Taipei. Those locations were closed. Chefs Club retained the Aspen location and entered into a partnership with The Surf Lodge of Montauk Long Island to create The Snow Lodge supper club concept. Due to the immense success of the Snow Lodge concept the collaboration has been extended to 2025.

The restaurant has been called "a showcase for culinary stars" and has been named to Time Magazine's list of 100 Best Restaurants. Visiting chefs have included Zaiyu Hasegawa, Alain Ducasse, Daniel Humm of Eleven Madison Park, Alvin Cailin of Eggslut, Matthew Lightner of Atera, Jonathon Sawyer of the Greenhouse Tavern and Noodlecat, Bao La of Le Garçon Saigon, Kevin Willmann of Farmhaus, Jenn Louis of Lincoln and Sunshine Tavern, Mathieu Pacaud of L'Ambroisie, Cyril Lignac of Le Quinzième, JJ Johnson of Minton's, Jeremiah Langhorne of The Dabney, Sota Atsumi of Clown Bar, Georges Mendes, Emeril Lagasse, Marcus Samuelsson, Jacques Pépin, Matthew Accarrino, and many more.

De Baets has stated his desire to turn the Chefs Club concept into a global concept.

=== Other Ventures ===
In April 2025, De Baets and wife, Sabrina, purchased Viewline Resort Snowmass, Wildwood Snowmass, and Snowmass Conference Center.

== Redstone Castle ==
In April 2022 Elevated Returns, through its wholly owned subsidiary ER Wellness, acquired Redstone Castle. Approvals were passed to turn Redstone Castle into a wellness retreat, part of RAKxa Wellness, in April 2024.

== Personal life ==
De Baets is married to hospitality executive Sabrina Huls. They live in Aspen and have five children.

De Baets speaks French, English, Dutch and Thai.
