= L'Ambroisie =

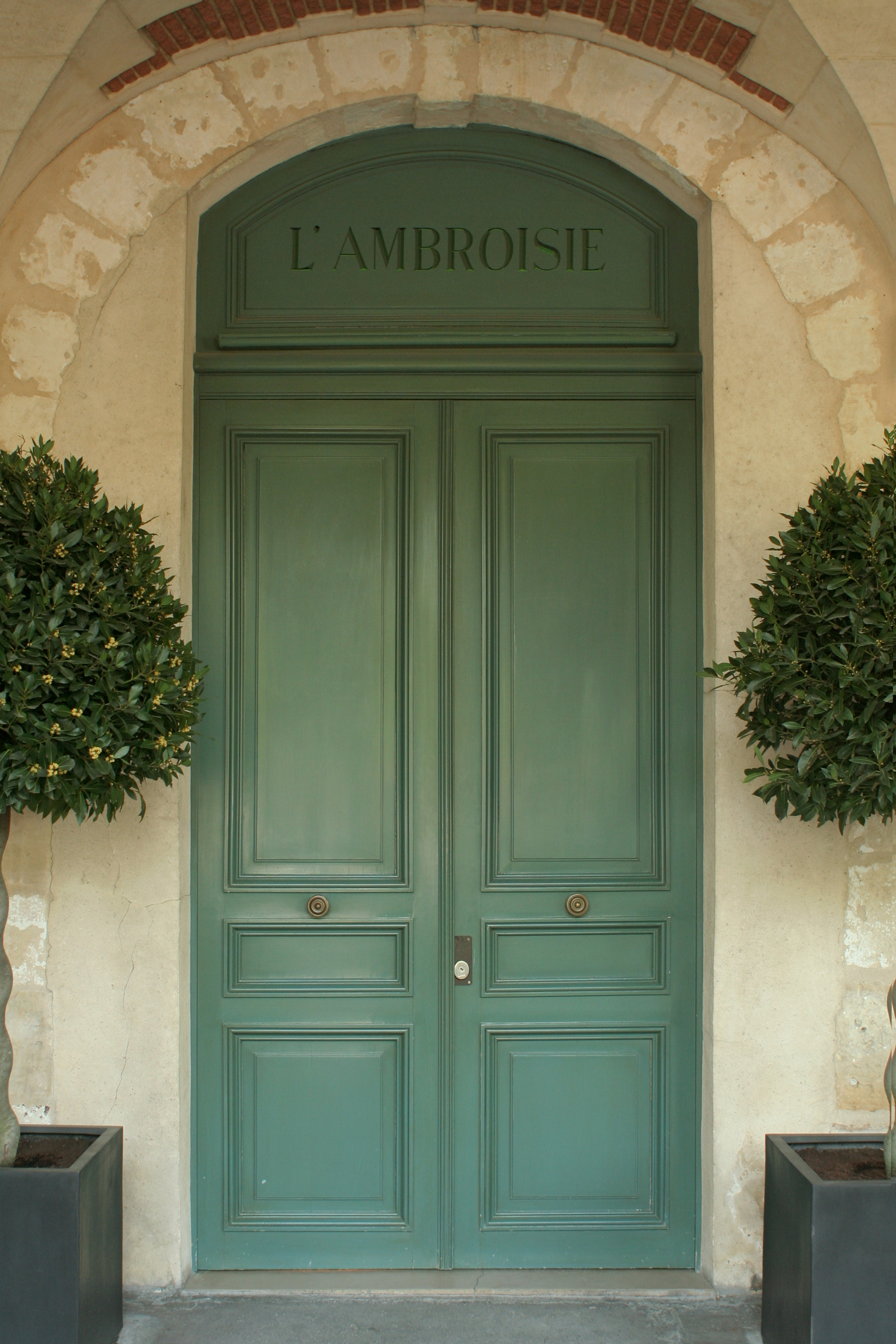
- Interactive map of L'Ambroisie

Restaurant information
- Established: 1986; 40 years ago
- Head chef: Shintaro Awa
- Food type: French
- Rating: (Michelin Guide)
- Location: 9 Place des Vosges, Paris, 75004, France
- Coordinates: 48.8554°N 2.3643°E
- Reservations: Required
- Website: www.ambroisie-paris.com

L'Ambroisie (French pronunciation: [lɑ̃bʁwazi]) is a traditional French restaurant in Paris, France. It was founded by Danièle and Bernard Pacaud, and is now owned by Walter Butler of Butler Industries Group. L'Ambroisie maintained three Michelin stars from 1988 until 2026, where it lost a star. The name "L'Ambroisie" ("Ambrosia" in English) comes from Greek mythology and means both "food for gods" and "source of immortality."

== Location ==
The restaurant is in a period house on the southwestern corner of the Place des Vosges in Paris.

== Founder ==
The restaurant's founder and head chef is Bernard Pacaud. He was abandoned by his parents at age 13 and raised in an orphanage in the mountains of Lyonnais.

Pacaud started cooking at age 15, in 1962, as an apprentice at the famed Eugenie (Mére) Brazier's restaurant Col de la Luère, located 20 km from Lyon. Pacaud spent the next three years as a commis at the Tante Alice restaurant in Lyon before becoming chef de partie at La Méditerranée in Paris. Pushed by Eugénie Brazier's encouragement, he applied to work in 1976 with Claude Peyrot, the chef and owner of the Vivarois (a Michelin three-star restaurant) on avenue Victor Hugo in Paris. In 1981, he opened his restaurant quai de la Tournelle (at the crossing with rue de Bièvres) in Paris. In 1986, he opened L'Ambroisie at Place des Vosges, and obtained three Michelins stars in 1988, which he has kept.

Pacaud rarely comes into the public's sight because he devotes himself to cuisine in the kitchen. He deeply values the quality of ingredients. When he first opened the restaurant, ingredient costs caused him to run a deficit. He has been described as following traditional processes of making food, taking the utmost care in dishes, and presenting every plate as an elegant art.

Pacaud passed on the restaurant to his son Mathieu in 2012, but continues to pay close attention and makes sure the restaurant maintains its high-level service and quality.

== History ==
L'Ambroisie won its first Michelin star in 1982, and won another the following year. Five years later in 1988, the restaurant won its third Michelin star.

In 2023, Pacaud sold the majority stake of his restaurant to businessman Walter Butler. In September of that year, L'Ambroisie hired chef Christophe Moret to take over as Pacaud's successor, but Moret left after just two months. He was quickly replaced by Japanese chef Shintaro Awa, who worked with Pacaud until L'Ambroisie officially announced Awa's succession as head chef in June 2025.

In March 2026, the Michelin Guide demoted L'Ambroisie to two stars. While Butler was disappointed by the outcome, he reaffirmed: "The two stars underline the excellent work of the new chef Shintaro Awa [...] Gastronomy is a continual quest, a dialogue with time and taste."

== In popular culture ==
- In November 2015, President Barack Obama had dinner with President Francois Hollande and US Secretary of State John Kerry at L'Ambroisie.
- L'Ambroisie was mentioned in the "One more time" monologue by James Spader playing Raymond Reddington in the episode Anslo Garrick of the television show The Blacklist.
- In 2019, L'Ambroisie was featured in the Japanese television series La Grande Maison Tokyo (グランメゾン東京) as one of the restaurants in which the television series takes place.

== See also ==
- List of Michelin 3-star restaurants
- List of Michelin-starred restaurants in Paris
