= Francois Bise =

French restaurateur

- Culinary career
- Cooking style: French
- Rating: Michelin stars
- Current restaurant: Auberge du Père Bise

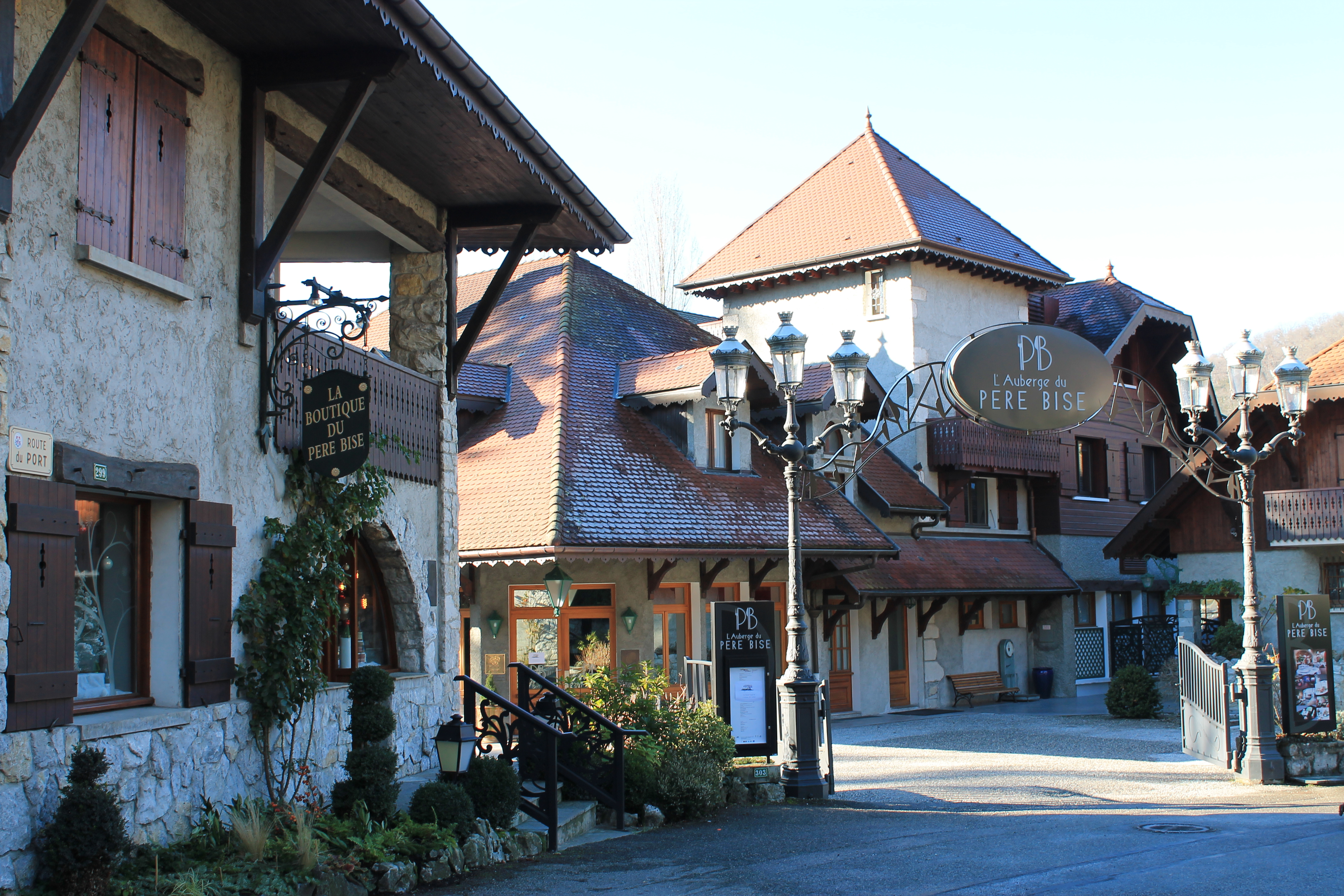
Auberge du Pere Bise in Talloires, France

Francois Bise (French pronunciation: [fʁɑ̃swa biz], died 1983) was a French chef and restaurateur.

His mother, Marguerite Bise was a chef and restaurateur at Auberge du Père Bise in Talloires, Haute-Savoie, and one of the first women to win three Michelin stars.

Francois Bise trained under the father of modern French cuisine, Fernand Point.

In 1968 he became head chef at Auberge du Père Bise, his mother having died in 1965. He once again won three stars for the restaurant during the 1970s.

Bise died in 1983 of cancer. His wife, Charlyne, continues to run the restaurant and his daughter, Sophie Bise, won back their third Michelin star when she was only 21.
