= Drew Smith (food writer) =

British food writer (born 1950)

Drew Smith (born 1950) is an English food writer, critic, editor, broadcaster and translator. He was The Guardian restaurant columnist, editor of The Good Food Guide, and presenter and investigative journalist of Channel 4’s Food File TV programme. His books include Oyster, a Gastronomic History of the World (with Recipes); Soupology, Six Broths for 70 Soups; and Modern Cooking: From the First Backstreet Bistros of Lyons to the Finest Restaurants. He also translated La Mère Brazier: The Mother of Modern French Cooking, by Eugénie Brazier into English and acted as a consultant editor on the first translation of The Talisman of Happiness, by Ada Boni.

== Food journalism and broadcasting ==
Smith was appointed editor of The Good Food Guide in 1981, after winning the restaurant writer of the year award at the Glenfiddich Food and Drink Awards. He held the post of editor until 1989. Whilst at The Good Food Guide, Smith coined the term Modern British Cooking to describe regional and traditional British cuisine.. He had strong views on some regional cuisine, describing in 1982 that the lack of good food options in the North East England was a "black hole of gastronomy".

In 1981 he was appointed restaurant columnist for The Guardian, where he stayed until 1990. When Smith inspected the London branch of Maxim's restaurant in 1983 without wearing a tie, the door staff presented Smith with a selection of public school ties to borrow while dining. The Guardian's headline on the resultant review went: "Sunshine, at £18, I’ll eat it stark naked with chopsticks if I like."

In 1991 Smith launched Channel 4’s investigative food programme Food File. Notable episodes include one that explored The Mediterranean diet for the first time on British TV, and an exposé of the potential harm of saturated fats.

Smith is also known for his radio and podcast work. He presented A beginner’s guide to the oysters on BBC Sounds and was featured on the BBC’s The Food Programme.

Smith has contributed to newspapers and magazines, including The Sunday Times, The Guardian and The Independent, as well as being cited in several books and articles about food and hospitality.

== Books ==
Smith is a book author and editor. His works include Oyster, a Gastronomic History of the World (with Recipes) – voted one of American Vogue’s books of the year – Soupology, Six Broths for 70 Soups and Modern Cooking: From the First Backstreet Bistros of Lyons to the Finest Restaurants. He was instrumental in bringing two European classic recipe books to English audiences for the first time: La Mère Brazier: The Mother of Modern French Cooking, a French classic by Eugénie Brazier, the first woman awarded six Michelin stars, which Smith translated into English and was named the 2018 book of the year by The Observer. He also published The Talisman of Happiness by Ada Boni, for which he served as consultant editor on the first English translation of the Italian cooking book. Smith also collaborated on a series of books with Dr Stephan Domenig of the FX Mayr clinic in Austria, exploring the benefits of the alkaline diet. He is currently editor-at-large for book publisher Elwin Street Productions.

== Other work ==
Smith is one of the founders of the Guild of Food Writers and acted as Head of Food Policy at the London Docklands Development Corporation from 1999 to 2001.

== Awards ==
Glenfiddich Food and Drink Awards, restaurant critic of the year 1979, 1982, 1985.
