= Anslo Garrick Conclusion =

- The Blacklist episode
- Episode no.: Season 1 Episode 10
- Directed by: Michael Watkins
- Written by: Lukas Reiter; J. R. Orci
- Production code: 110
- Original air date: December 2, 2013

Guest appearances
- Ritchie Coster as Anslo Garrick; Hisham Tawfiq as Dembe Zuma; Amir Arison as Aram Mojtabai; Susan Blommaert as Mr. Kaplan; Graeme Malcolm as The Man with the Apple; Emily Tremaine as Audrey Bidwell; Jane Alexander as Diane Fowler

Episode chronology
← Previous "Anslo Garrick"	Next → "The Good Samaritan"
- The Blacklist season 1

"Anslo Garrick Conclusion", or "Anslo Garrick Part Two", is the tenth episode of the first season of the American crime drama The Blacklist and a direct continuation of "Anslo Garrick". The episode premiered in the United States on NBC on December 2, 2013.

== Plot ==
Elizabeth infiltrates the blacksite and with Aram disarms the signal jammers so as to call in backup, but they are captured by Garrick. In an effort to save Elizabeth, Red threatens Ressler with a gun into giving up the password, and surrenders to Garrick. Elizabeth escapes captivity during the getaway, and utilizing a contact Reddington named prior to her escape, a woman named "Mr. Kaplan" (Susan Blommaert), Elizabeth learns of an unidentified party providing surveillance on everyone in the task force. A discovery made by Aram leads Elizabeth to the surveillance team stationed in the building across the street from her place. While in captivity, Red resists torture and is evasive with talking to a former colleague (special guest star Alan Alda), who hired Garrick to capture him. Red later manages to kill Garrick with a pair of surgical scissors and escapes before an FBI rescue team led by Elizabeth enters the scene. A hospitalized Ressler is visited by a former fiancee he alluded to in the previous episode, Audrey Bidwell; Reddington is wanted for capture by the task force. Red makes another phone call to Elizabeth stating that he will be there for her when needed. Liz asks Red if he is her real father, but Red denies it, and gives her another warning about Tom before disappearing.

== Reception ==
=== Ratings ===
"Anslo Garrick Conclusion" premiered on NBC on December 2, 2013, in the 10–11 p.m. time slot. The episode garnered a 3.2/9 Nielsen rating with 11.67 million viewers, making it the highest rated show in its time slot and the ninth most watched television show of the week.

=== Reviews ===
Jason Evans of The Wall Street Journal gave a positive review of the episode: "Wow!! So much packed into one exciting hour of TV! I can barely process all that happened. After the show, NBC announces that The Blacklist will return on January 13th, a much shorter hiatus than some had feared. Yippee!! I can’t wait for it to come back!"

Jodi Walker of Entertainment Weekly "preferred the focused and speedy pacing" of "Anslo Garrick" more than "Anslo Garrick Conclusion". She went on to say: "Monday's episode gave us at least a few of the answers we’ve been waiting for, re: apple-eating spies and paternity implications. And then it added, like, 1,000 more questions. I guess this thing is a marathon, not a sprint; better stay hydrated".
