= Anslo Garrick =

- The Blacklist episode
- Episode no.: Season 1 Episode 9
- Directed by: Joe Carnahan
- Story by: Joe Carnahan; Jason George
- Teleplay by: Joe Carnahan
- Production code: 109
- Original air date: November 25, 2013

Guest appearances
- Ritchie Coster as Anslo Garrick; Hisham Tawfiq as Dembe Zuma; Deborah S. Craig as Luli Zeng; Amir Arison as Aram Mojtabai; Dikran Tulaine as Max

Episode chronology
← Previous "General Ludd"	Next → "Anslo Garrick Conclusion"
- The Blacklist season 1

"Anslo Garrick" is the ninth episode of the first season of the American crime drama The Blacklist. The episode premiered in the United States on NBC on November 25, 2013.

== Plot ==
Anslo Garrick (Ritchie Coster), a terrorist who once worked with Red but parted from him on bad terms, initiates an attack in an effort to assassinate Red. During the raid, Donald is severely wounded from a shotgun blast to the leg. Red carries him to a bulletproof holding cell and the two remain locked inside, as Red attends to Donald's wound. Elizabeth gets stuck in an elevator but frees herself. She works her way through the facility, taking out Garrick's men along the way, until one of them knocks her unconscious. A code is needed to free Red from the cell and without it, Garrick starts killing people. Harold is the only one who knows the code, but refuses to give it to Garrick. Red is forced to watch as Garrick kills Luli. He begs Harold to open the cell to no avail. With Garrick now with a gun to his head, Dembe tells Red that he's not afraid to die and that they'll meet again. The two say goodbye to each other by reciting a verse from the Quran. A gunshot is heard as the episode cuts to black.

== Reception ==
=== Ratings ===
"Anslo Garrick" premiered on NBC on November 25, 2013, in the 10–11 p.m. time slot. The episode garnered a 3.0/8 Nielsen rating with 10.96 million viewers, making it the second most-watched show in its time slot behind ABC's Castle, which collected 11.41 million viewers. "Anslo Garrick" was also the eighth most-watched television show of the week.

=== Reviews ===
Jason Evans of The Wall Street Journal gave a positive review of the episode, praising the "tense" action and "brilliantly acted" performances in the episode. He went on to say: "Even though we got nothing in terms of the overall story about Red and Liz's relationship or the truth about Tom Bond, this was a fabulous episode. I enjoyed them breaking out of the rut of chasing down one Blacklist member each week. This was truly fun!"

Phil Dyess-Nugent of The A.V. Club gave the episode a "C+". He wrote: "This is the closest thing to a pure action episode that The Blacklist has attempted. Joe Carnahan, thank God, is directing again. With him in charge, much of the action is comprehensible, and a few stray moments of it are striking".
