= Sophie Bise =

French chef

- Culinary career
- Cooking style: French cuisine
- Rating(s): Michelin stars
- Previous restaurant(s): Auberge du Père Bise

Sophie Bise (French pronunciation: [sɔfi biz]) is a French chef in France at Auberge du Père Bise.

== Career ==
Sophie Bise trained with Pique Pierre in Grenoble, Outhier in La Napoule, La Maree in Paris, and Gaertner in Ammerschwihr. She worked around the world in many kitchens in New York, Venezuela and Brazil, among others, and then returned to Auberge du Père Bise in 1987 to the restaurant started by her parents, grandparents and great grandparents.

In 1985, Sophie enabled the restaurant to earn back one of the Michelin stars lost while her father, Francois Bise, was dying. As a result of her work, Auberge was reinstated as one of 19 top establishments in France.

== Publications ==
Her book,The Auberge du Père Bise, was published in 2013 by Carre Blanc Editions. It contains 38 of her recipes.
