= Anne Goldberg =

Belgian physicist

- Education: Université libre de Bruxelles
- Occupation: Physicist

Anne Goldberg is a Belgian physicist, expert in polymers, nanomaterials and material characterisation.

== Career ==
Goldberg spent most of her career working in research and innovation at Solvay. She set up testing methods to understand solid-state physics of polymers, especially fracture mechanisms and managed various portfolios in the field of nanotechnology.

As of 2021, she is a Member of the Strategic Advisory Committee in the Graphene Flagship, a Member of the Board of Directors on behalf of Solvay at Materia Nova, a Member of the European Industrial Research Management Association (EIRMA) task force on responsible innovation and a Member of the Club of Rome EU Chapter. She teaches innovation and history of science at the University of Mons.

Goldberg gives talks about women and diversity in science and created the Solvay's “Girls leading in science” (GirLS) contest with the support of Hub.Brussels and BeWiSe.
