= La Mère Brazier =

Michelin starred restaurant in Lyon, France

Coordinates: 45.7714°N 4.8372°E

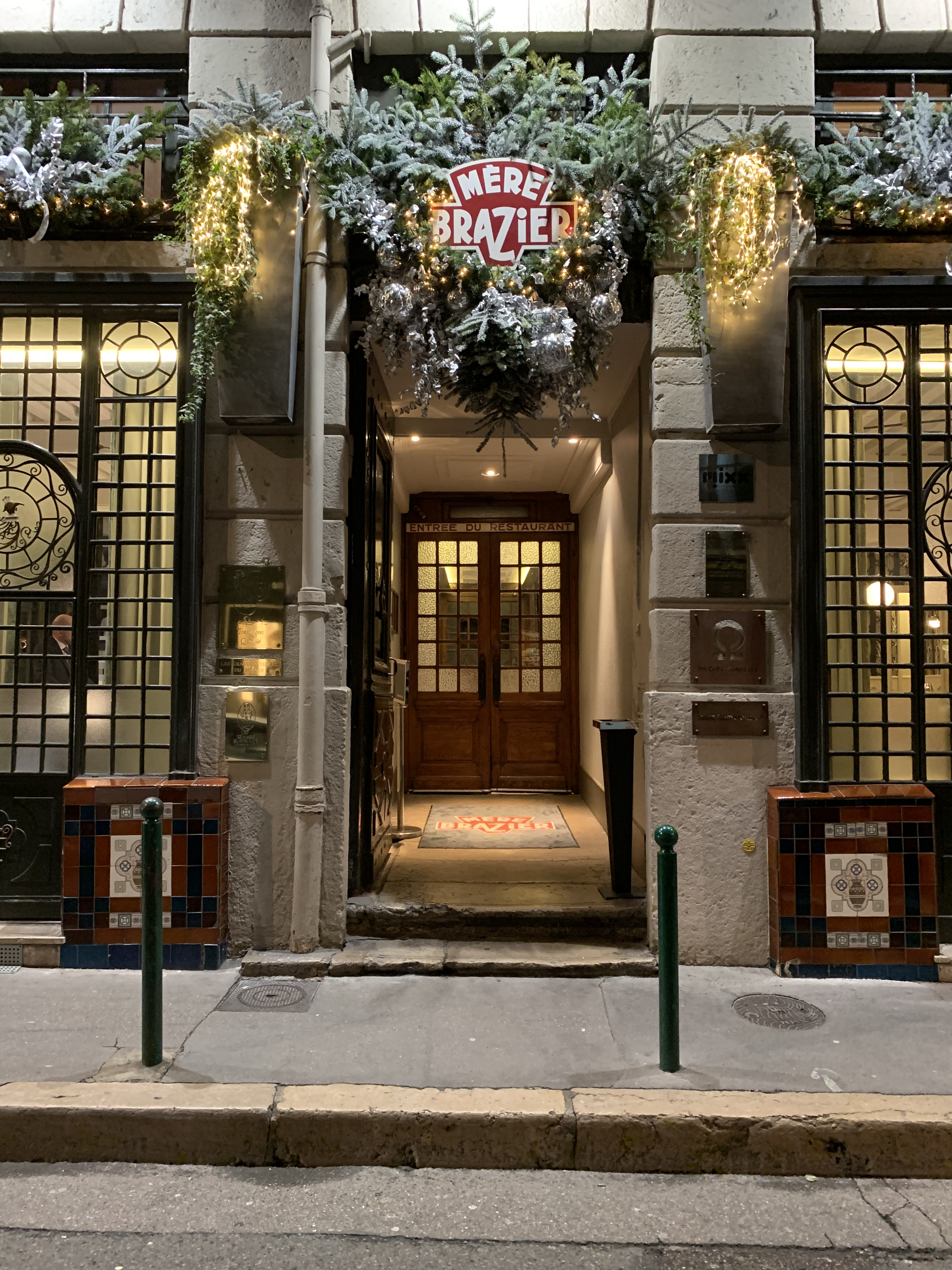
La Mère Brazier

La Mère Brazier is a restaurant in the 1st arrondissement of Lyon, Lyon Metropolis, France. The restaurant was established in 1921 and was awarded the prestigious 3 Michelin stars under its founder and chef, Eugénie Brazier, between 1933 and 1968. It was bought by chef Mathieu Viannay in 2008. The restaurant holds 2 Michelin stars, as of 2023.

== See also ==
- List of Michelin starred restaurants
