= Joseph Wechsberg =

Czech writer and musician (1907–1983)

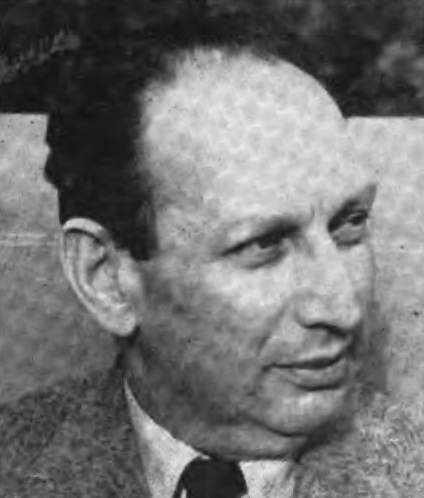
Wechsberg c. 1954

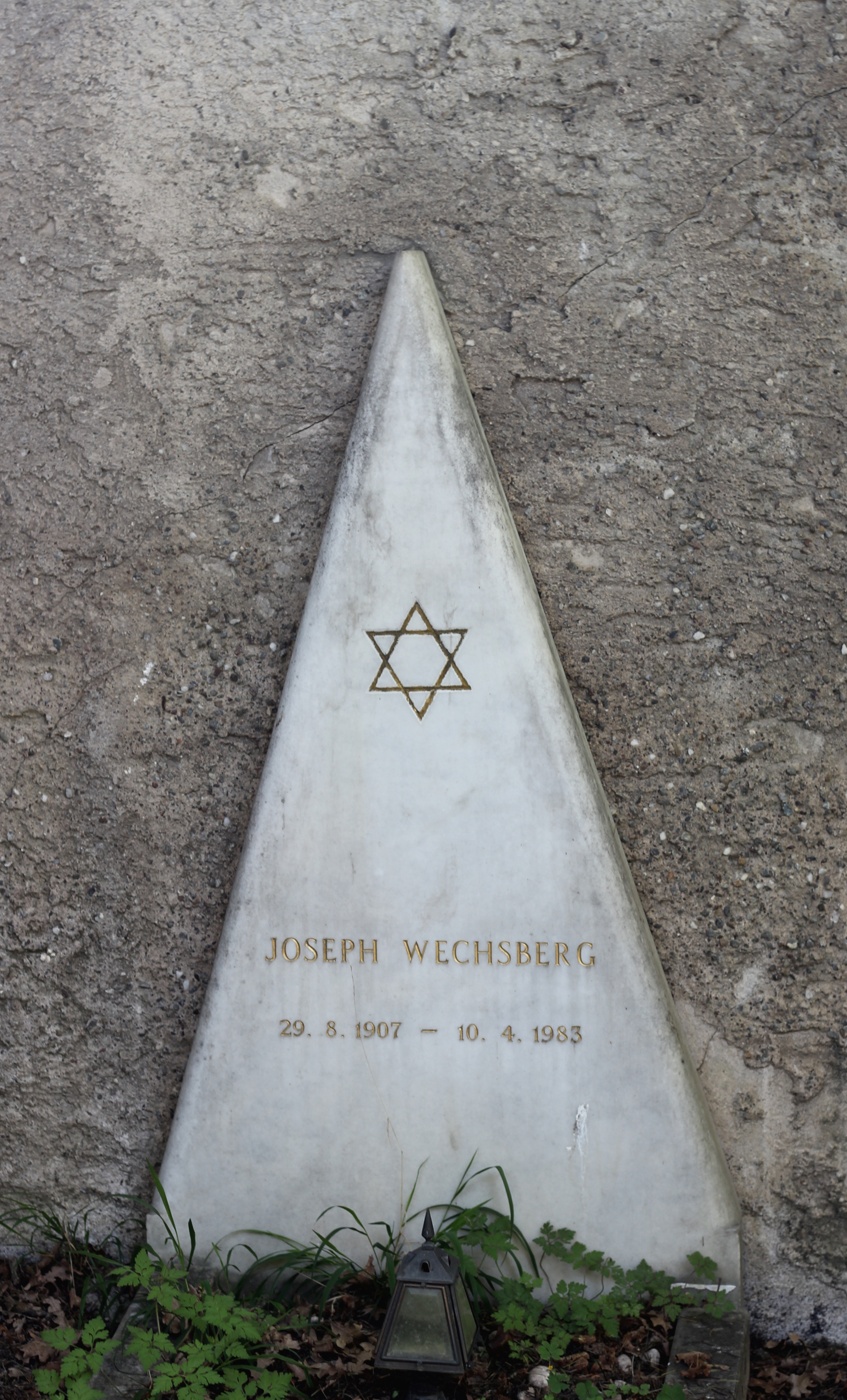
Wechsberg's tombstone at the Jewish cemetery in Meran, Italy

Joseph Wechsberg (29 August 1907 – 10 April 1983) was a Jewish Czech writer, journalist and musician.

He was born in Moravská Ostrava in Austria-Hungary. He and his wife requested and received asylum in the United States in 1939 when Germany invaded Czechoslovakia. His mother was among the Czech Jews interned by the Nazis and later was murdered at Auschwitz. Over his career he was a prolific writer who wrote over two dozen works of nonfiction, including books on music and musicians, and contributed numerous articles to publications such as The New Yorker.

== Bibliography ==
=== Books ===
- Homecoming. New York: Knopf. 1946.
- Looking for a Bluebird, Penguin, 1948
- Blue Trout & Black Truffles (the peregrinations of an Epicure), Alfred A.Knopf, 1954
- Avalanche, Weidenfeld and Nicolson, 1958 (Note: An account of a deadly avalanche in Blons, Austria, in 1954.)
- Red Plush and Black Velvet: the Story of Dame Nellie Melba and her Times, Little, Brown and Company, Boston, 1962.
- The Merchant Bankers, Little, Brown and Company, Boston, 1966.
- The Murderers Among Us, McGraw-Hill, New York, 1967. LCN 67-13204.
- The Voices, 1969 (Note: Account written in Vienna of the Soviet invasion of Czechoslovakia.)
- The First Time Around: Some Irreverent Recollections, Little, Brown and Company, Boston, 1970. LCN 75-108954.
- The Glory of the Violin, Viking Adult, 1973, ISBN 978-0670342662
- The Lost World of the Great Spas, New York: Harper & Row, 1979 ISBN 0060145846
- The Vienna I Knew, Doubleday & Company, Inc., Garden City, New York, 1979, ISBN 0-385-12674-3
- Trifles Make Perfection: Selected Essays of Joseph Wechsberg, Boston: David R. Godine, 1999 ISBN 1-56792-092-6 LCN 98-29258

=== Short fiction ===
Stories

Title	Year	First published	Reprinted/collected	Notes
The magic carpet	1950	Wechsberg, Joseph (January 7, 1950). "The magic carpet". The New Yorker. 25 (46): 23–26.		
New York is full of girls			Wechsberg, Joseph (1953). "New York is full of girls". In Birmingham, Frederic A. (ed.). The girls from Esquire. London: Arthur Barker. pp. 93–100.	

== In popular culture ==
Wechsberg's book Blue Trout & Black Truffles was gifted by Nick Kokonas to Grant Achatz while Nick was trying to convince Grant to form a restaurant partnership with him. The result was Alinea, the only Chicago restaurant to retain a three-star status, Michelin's highest accolade.
