= Georges Blanc =

French chef and restaurateur

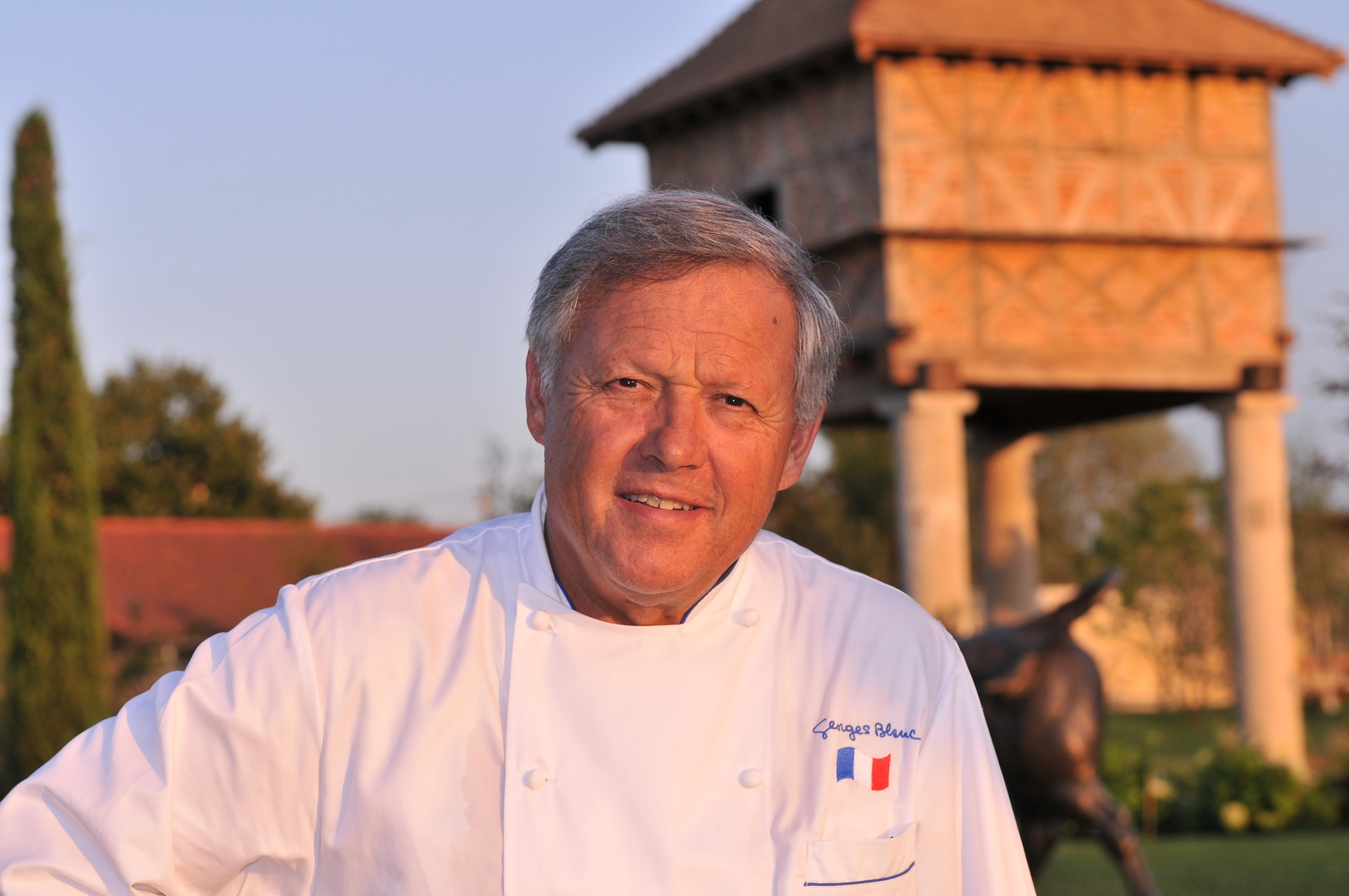
- Born: 2 January 1943 (age 83); Bourg-en-Bresse, Ain, France
- Culinary career
- Ratings: Michelin stars; Gault et Millau (19.5/20)
- Current restaurants: Restaurant Georges Blanc; Georges Blanc Parc & Spa; Les Saules Parc & Spa
- Website: georgesblanc.com

Georges Blanc (French pronunciation: [ʒɔʁʒ blɑ̃]; born 2 January 1943 in Bourg-en-Bresse in the department of Ain) is a French chef and restaurateur, with two Michelin stars and four toques from the guide Gault et Millau.

== Private life ==
Georges Blanc is the son of Jean and Paulette Blanc. He has an older sister who was born in 1933. His grandmother Élisa, known as Mere Blanc (Mother Blanc), died at her home in Vonnas at the age of 66. Georges Blanc's two sons Frédéric and Alexandre Blanc participate in the family business.

== Career ==
In 1962, he graduated at the École Hôtelière of Thonon-les-Bains in Haute-Savoie. Before becoming interested in working as a chef he worked as a flight attendant for Air France, traveling all over the world during one summer.

In 1965, after working in a number of renowned places, he did his military service as a chef to Amiral Vedel on the Foch and Clémenceau aircraft carriers. He joined the family business (started in 1872) working with his mother Paulette and then succeeded her in 1968 at the age of twenty five. He transformed the hotel into a luxury hotel with the subsequent development of adjacent properties into a gourmet village.

In 1970, he came third in the best sommeliers of France contest and was a finalist in the Meilleur Ouvrier de France contest in Paris in 1976.

In 1981, he received his third Michelin star and the title of Chef of the Year in the Gault et Millau guide. In 1985, he received the rare mark of 19.5/20 from the same guide, a mark that had never before been attained.

In 1990, Georges Blanc bought the Charvet-Guyennet family’s café-gastronomy-bakery to create the Ancienne Auberge. He also opened 17 houses around his restaurant at the center of Vonnas to create his "village gourmand" (hotels, restaurants, shops, etc.) These are all kept in the original design with a historic theme to the Village Blanc. There is emphasis on the village being sustainable and a healthy environment. There are 12 acres around the original restaurant, about thirty houses have been renovated. It also includes hotels and spas within the village.

In 2025, the Georges Blanc restaurant lost a Michelin star, leaving it with two.

== Television ==
With Cyril Lignac, he is a member of the jury for the television program Un dîner vraiment parfait, a spin-off of Un dîner presque parfait (French version of Come Dine with Me) on M6.

== Honours ==
- Commander of the Legion of Honour (11 July 2008)
- Officer of the National Order of Merit (2 August 1993)
- Commander du Ordre du Mérite Agricole (1993)
- Knight (Chevalier) of the Ordre des Palmes Académiques (2002)
- Commander of the Ordre des Arts et des Lettres (2004)
