= La Pyramide =

Coordinates: 45°31′00″N 4°52′01″E

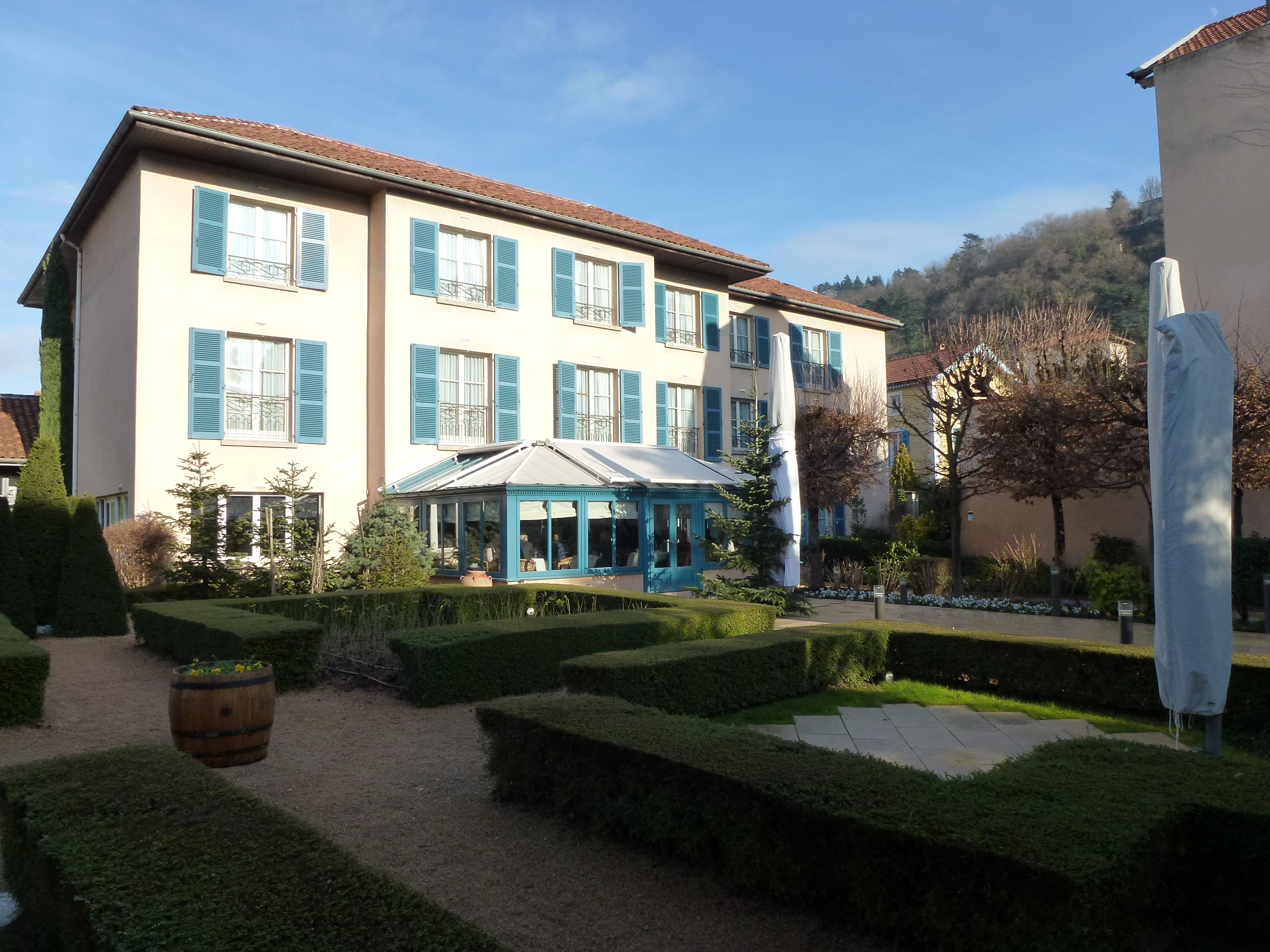
- Gardens at the restaurant and hotel
- Location: Vienne, France
- Governing body: Private

Restaurant De La Pyramide, popularly known as La Pyramide, was a Michelin Guide 3-star restaurant located in Vienne, Isère, France. It was widely regarded as the greatest restaurant in France while its owner Fernand Point (1897–1955) was alive.

== History ==
Point renamed the restaurant that his father bought. He quit Royal Hotel and started working there at 24. He changed the name to La Pyramide after a nearby Roman pyramid that had marked the turn of a chariot racetrack.

Point was strict and unforgiving in the kitchen, but he was known to play pranks on his patrons and visitors (often with Paul Bocuse as his apprentice and wing-man). Parisian high society visitors would find themselves ushered into the kitchen, pushed into a corner, and fed one of Point's dishes under the pretense of being asked to evaluate the readiness of the offering while Bocuse, hidden underneath a prep table, whitewashed the heels of their shoes.

Postmen and visiting locals fared not much better; in one famous stunt Point ordered Bocuse to paint the bicycle of a visiting gendarme pink while Point distracted his visitor.

After Point's death, his widow, Mado, carried on and maintained the restaurant's 3-star rating for many years.

== Present time ==
The restaurant changed hands and fell off the Michelin ratings, but after chef Patrick Henriroux took it over, it gained one Michelin star after a year and has two Michelin stars now.
