= Bernard Pacaud =

French cook, holder of three Michelin stars

- Born: 29 September 1947 (age 78)

Bernard Pacaud (French pronunciation: [bɛʁnaʁ pako]; born 29 September 1947) is a French chef, holder of three Michelin stars since 1986.

== Biography ==
Pacaud was born on September 29, 1947. He grew up in an orphanage, and in April 1962 he began to work as a kitchen hand for Eugénie Brazier at her restaurant near Lyon. She encouraged him and gave him his early training.

He continued his training at the Paris restaurant La Méditerranée, then joined La Coquille as second chef in 1973 and then the Vivarois, under chef Claude Peyrot.

In 1981, he opened his first restaurant, Ambroisie, in the rue de Bièvre in the 5th arrondissement of Paris. The Michelin Guide awarded him a first star the following year, a second one year later and a third in 1986. He opened his second Ambroisie in the former "Hotel des Luynes" in the Place des Vosges in the 4th arrondissement of Paris.

== Sources ==
- Brazier, Eugénie; Moreau, Roger; Bocuse, Paul; Pacaud, Bernard (2015) [2004]. La Mère Brazier: The Mother of Modern French Cooking. Translated by Drew Smith. London: Modern Books. ISBN 978-1-906761-84-4.
