= La Tranclière =

Commune in Auvergne-Rhône-Alpes, France

- Commune
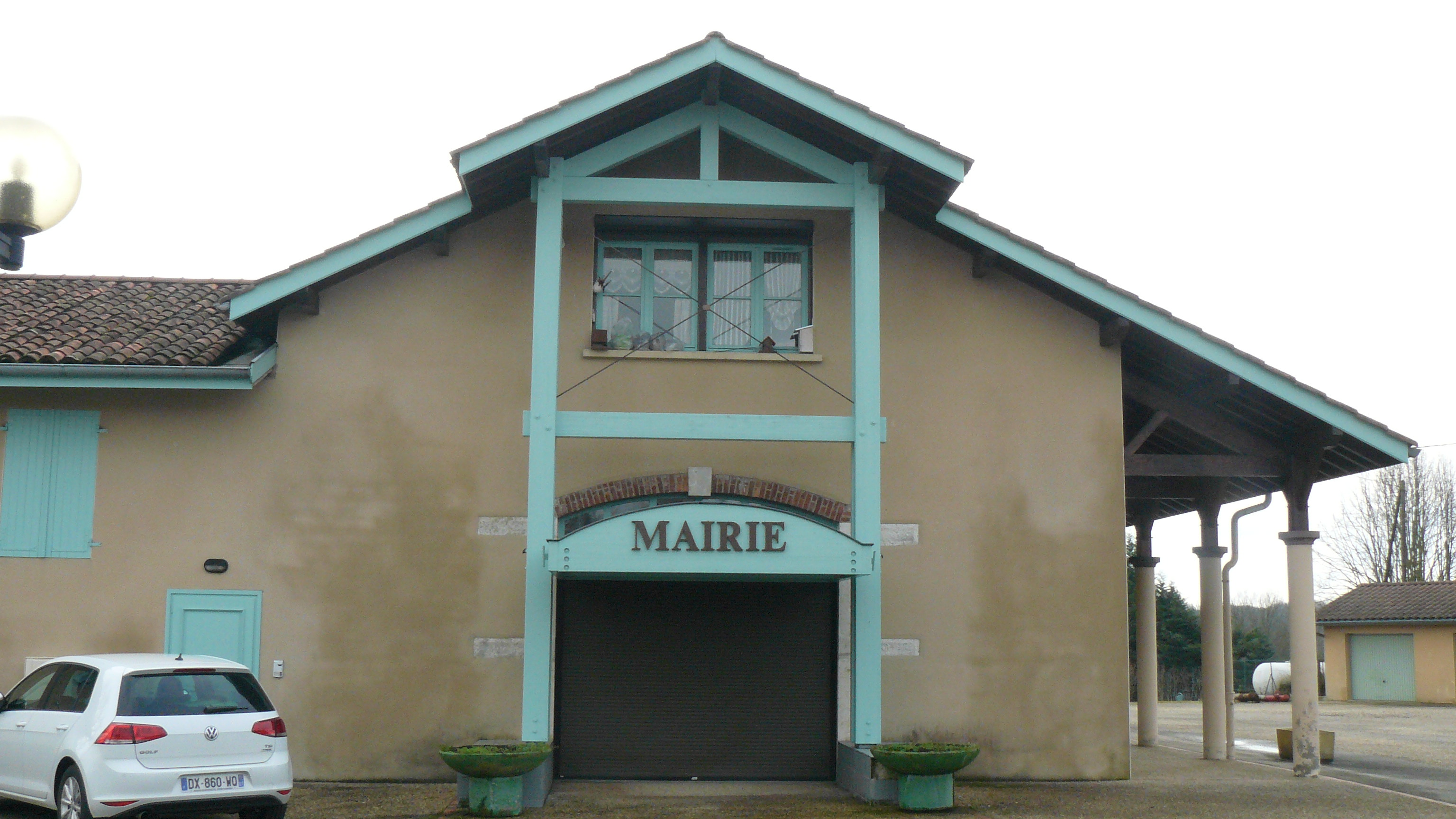
- Town hall
- Location of La Tranclière
- Location within France Location within Auvergne-Rhône-Alpes
- Coordinates: 46°07′00″N 5°16′00″E
- Country: France
- Region: Auvergne-Rhône-Alpes
- Department: Ain
- Arrondissement: Bourg-en-Bresse
- Canton: Ceyzériat
- Intercommunality: CA Bassin de Bourg-en-Bresse

Government
  - Mayor (2026–32): Delphine Paillon
- Area^{1}: 14.9 km^{2} (5.8 sq mi)
- Elevation: 275 m (902 ft)
- Highest elevation: 302 m (991 ft)
- Lowest elevation: 248 m (814 ft)
- Population (2023): 290
  - Density: 19/km^{2} (50/sq mi)
- Time zone: UTC+01:00 (CET)
  - Summer (DST): UTC+02:00 (CEST)
- INSEE/Postal code: 01425 /01160
- ^{1} French Land Register data, which excludes lakes, ponds, glaciers > 1 km^{2} (0.386 sq mi or 247 acres) and river estuaries.

La Tranclière (French pronunciation: [la tʁɑ̃klijɛʁ]) is a commune in the Ain department in eastern France.

== Population ==
Historical population
| Year | Pop. | ±% p.a. |
|---|---|---|
| 1968 | 170 | — |
| 1975 | 170 | +0.00% |
| 1982 | 212 | +3.20% |
| 1990 | 254 | +2.29% |
| 1999 | 300 | +1.87% |
| 2007 | 306 | +0.25% |
| 2012 | 302 | −0.26% |
| 2017 | 286 | −1.08% |
| 2023 | 290 | +0.23% |
Source: INSEE

== See also ==
- Communes of the Ain department
- Dombes
