= Fernand Point =

French chef and restaurateur

- Born: 25 February 1897; Louhans, France
- Died: 4 March 1955 (aged 58); Vienne, France
- Culinary career
- Cooking style: French
- Previous restaurant: "La Pyramide" in Vienne

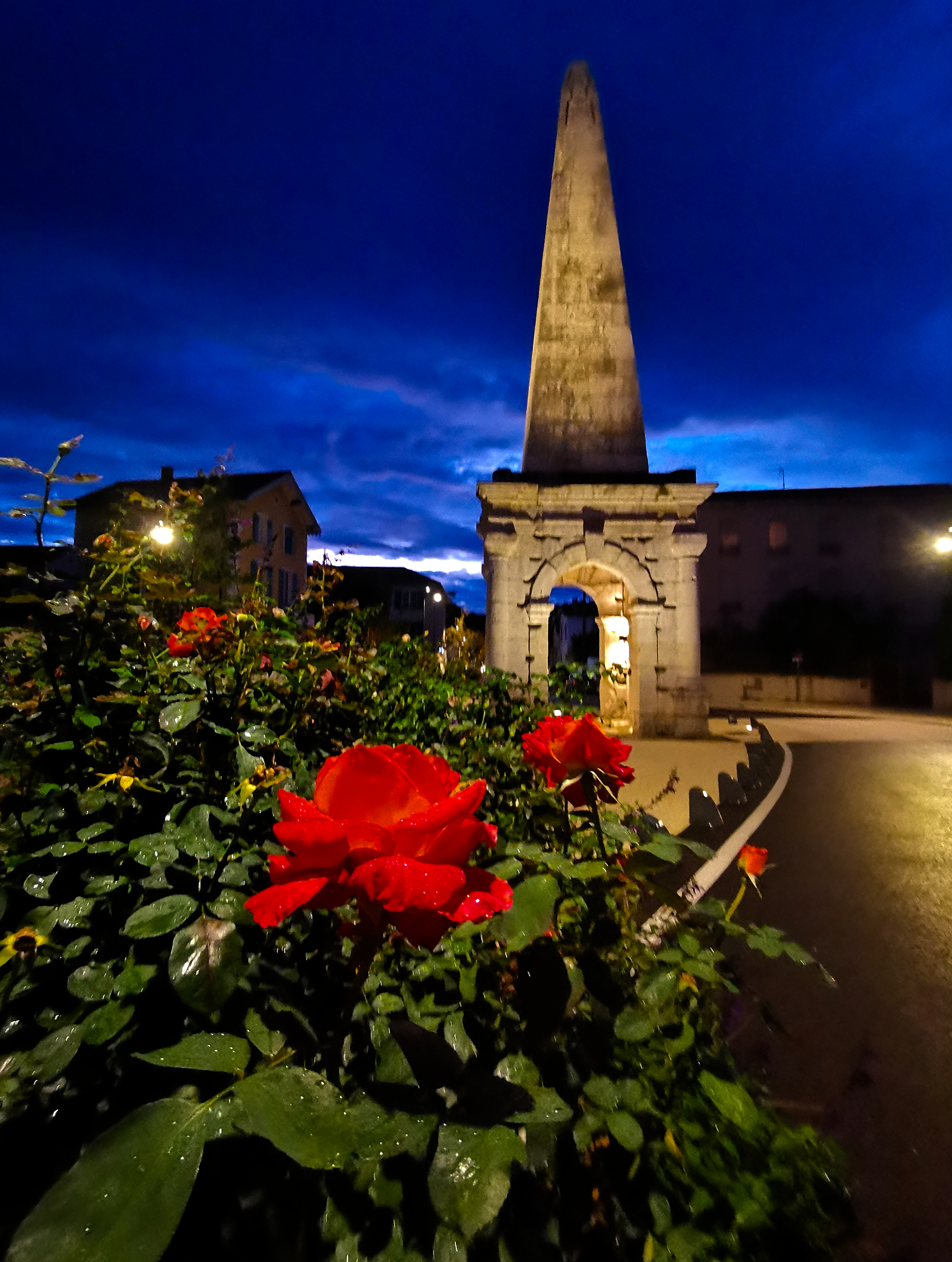
Stela on rue Fernand Point, for which the restaurant is named

Fernand Point (French pronunciation: [fɛʁnɑ̃ pwɛ̃], 25 February 1897 – 4 March 1955) was a French chef and restaurateur who is considered the father of modern French cuisine. He founded the restaurant La Pyramide in Vienne near Lyon.

== Early life ==
Point was born in Louhans, Saône-et-Loire, France. His family kept an inn where he started cooking when he was ten. He moved to Paris and worked at some of its best restaurants before working with Paul Bocuse's father at the Hôtel Royal (Évian-les-Bains) in Évian-les-Bains.

== Career ==
He had received his training with Foyot in Paris, the Bristol Hotel, Paris, the Majestic in Cannes, and the Royal Hotel in Évian-les-Bains. In 1922, he and his family moved to Vienne, a city in southeast France near Lyon, and opened a restaurant. Two years later his father left the restaurant to Fernand, who renamed it La Pyramide.

Point opened Restaurant de la Pyramide when he was 24, about 20 miles (32 km) south of Lyon in the town of Vienne. The restaurant was awarded three Michelin stars.

== Ma Gastronomie ==
His book Ma Gastronomie was first published in French in 1969. The book includes 200 recipes based on Point's notes. The chef Charlie Trotter described Point's Ma Gastronomie as the most important cookbook.

== Publications ==
- Point, Fernand (2008) Ma Gastronomie, Rookery Press. ISBN 978-1-58567-961-4
