= Bettina Korek =

American arts advocate (born 1978)

- Born: 1978 (age 47–48)
- Education: Princeton University, BA, art history (2000)
- Occupations: Arts executive Public arts advocate
- Employer(s): CEO, Serpentine Galleries
- Website: https://bettinakorek.com

Bettina Korek (born 1978) is an American arts executive and public arts advocate. She is the CEO of Serpentine, a contemporary art gallery housed across two sites in London's Kensington Gardens. Her work centers on bringing contemporary art to audiences outside of the traditional art world.

Born and raised in Los Angeles, Korek began her career at LACMA. In 2006 she founded ForYourArt, which began as a newsletter and became an independent entertainment organization that provided a platform for the Los Angeles art community. A member of the LA Arts Commission from 2011-2020, and its president from 2018-2019, she served as executive director of the first two Frieze LA art fairs prior to her Serpentine appointment.

Korek has worked with contemporary artists including Refik Anadol, Mark Bradford, John Baldessari, Barbara Kruger, Kaws, and Yinka Shonibare, among others, and staged exhibits at galleries, museums, and public spaces.

== Early life and education ==
Korek was born in 1978 to William Korek, a land broker, and Nancy Korek, a graphic designer and artist. She grew up in Van Nuys and attended secondary school at Harvard-Westlake. Her mother frequently took her to the Los Angeles County Museum of Art, where David Hockney's paintings of the Los Angeles canyons she recognized introduced her to representational art. She attended Princeton University and graduated with a BA in art history in 2000.

== Career ==
=== ForYourArt ===
Korek began her career at LACMA, initially in the prints and drawings department under curator Kevin Salatino, and later in development and communication. In 2006 she founded ForYourArt, which began as a newsletter that mapped, aggregated, and recommended exhibits and events in Los Angeles and became an independent arts organization that produced public events and provided a platform for Los Angeles artists.

In 2012, across the street from LACMA, ForYourArt (FYA) opened a gallery space for temporary experimental exhibitions and pop-ups that did not rely on traditional gallery or museum funding models. Between 2012 and 2015, FYA presented exhibitions and events at the space including Around the Clock: 24 Hour Donut City, a pop-up that riffed on LA's affection for donuts. During the 24-hour event, which coincided with a LACMA screening of Christian Marclay’s 24-hour film The Clock, FYA handed out approximately 2,700 donuts, some from a Kenny Scharf-designed truck. In 2013, FYA presented In the Good Name of the Company, an exhibition of posters that followed the 2012 closure of Colby Printing Co., an LA company known for printing posters commissioned by artists including Ed Ruscha, Allen Ruppersberg, Andy Warhol, and Roy Lichtenstein. During the same time period, FYA published a guide to L.A. art which was translated into Chinese to accompany an exhibition of L.A. artists at the UCCA Center for Contemporary Art Beijing.

In 2012, Korek collaborated with Barbara Kruger on an Art Matters campaign sponsored by the Los Angeles Fund for Public Education, overseeing a project that wrapped Metro buses with Kruger's work. The following year, as part of the same campaign, John Baldessari turned 12 city buses into traditional yellow school buses and painted "Learn to dream" in English and Spanish on each side. Korek again collaborated with Kruger in 2013, partnering with Alex Israel to create sunglasses that displayed Kruger's text "Your gaze hits the side of my face". In 2014, she hosted a spoken word tribute to Baldessari with more than 50 artists, curators, and impresarios reading from his book, More Than You Wanted to Know About John Baldessari, Vol. 1.

=== Pacific Standard Time, Touching the Art, Frieze Los Angeles ===
Independent of ForYourArt, Korek organized the 2012 and 2017 gallery programs for the Pacific Standard Time series, an annual Getty exhibit that focused on the significance of contemporary art in Los Angeles. From 2014 through 2015, she executive-produced the comic web series Touching the Art for the Ovation network, a satirical talk show created by Casey Jane Ellison and Shaw Bowman. It featured all-female panels of curators, artists, collectors, and critics discussing issues in contemporary art. Korek appeared as a panelist alongside Catherine Opie and Jori Finkel in the pilot episode.

Korek was executive director of Frieze Los Angeles in 2019, its inaugural year. An extension of the Frieze Art Fair in London, the LA program was designed to merge the art-meets-commerce culture of Hollywood with the art-meets-commerce ethos of Frieze. It was held on the Paramount Pictures studio lot. Projects were staged on its New York City backlot set, in addition to a tent designed by Kulapat Yantrasast. Ten booths were subsidized for young gallerists, and free space was made available for non-profit groups. Korek organized the Mark Bradford project Life Size, a detailed image and 3-D sculpture of a police body camera created to bring attention to criminal justice reform. The image appeared on posters around the city and on a 30-foot billboard on the Paramount grounds. A limited-edition Life Size print series raised $1 million for Art For Justice.

Korek continued in her role as executive director for Frieze Los Angeles in 2020. Among other LA-centered projects, she commissioned drawings of varied sections of the city that artists had to complete within a specified time frame and organized Kruger's Untitled (Questions), a series of questions in bright green and white that appeared on murals, print and digital ads, and light poles throughout the city. The non-profits on site at Frieze expanded from ten in 2019 to sixteen in 2020.

== Serpentine ==
Korek was named CEO of the London gallery Serpentine in December 2019. She arrived in London in March 2020, a week before the COVID-19 lockdown in the UK.

Working in collaboration with Serpentine's artistic director Hans Ulrich Obrist, Korek maintained her focus on making contemporary art more accessible to more people. Assisted by partnerships with brands including Fortnite, Dior, The Lego Group, and Stone Island, first-time visitors comprised 33% of Serpentine's annual attendance in 2025. Income increased by 53% between 2020 and 2025.

In 2025, Serpentine partnered with the New York-based FLAG Art Foundation to establish the Serpentine x FLAG Art Foundation Prize, an award for artists who have been exhibiting professionally for fewer than ten years. The £200,000 award, presented biennially to five artists over a ten-year period, is the UK's largest prize for a living artist. In September 2026, Serpentine named the first four fellows of its art and AI research and development program, Future Art Ecosystems. In addition to mentorship, each fellow received £10,000.

Serpentine's exhibitions and installations since Korek's arrival include Kaws NEW FICTION with Acute Art; Echoes of the Earth: Living Archive (by Refik Anadol); Suspended States (by Yinka Shonibare); Thinking of You. I Mean Me. I Mean You (by Barbara Kruger); emagendat (Lauren Halsey), Satie Studs (Michael Clark) with Peter Doig's House of Music, and Picture Making (Cecily Brown).The September 2026 Hockney exhibit, A Year in Normandie and Some Other Thoughts About Painting, drew 300,000 visitors, becoming the most well-attended exhibition in Serpentine's 56-year history.
