= Touching the Art =

Web series

Touching the Art logo

Touching the Art is a comedic web series created by comedian and artist Casey Jane Ellison and Emmy-winning writer/producer Shaw Bowman and produced by Ellison, Bowman and arts advocate Bettina Korek for Ovation. The series is formatted as a talk show, hosted by Ellison, and features an all-female panel of industry experts discussing issues in the contemporary art world. The show has featured artists, curators, critics and other art world insiders, including Catherine Opie, Jori Finkel, A. L. Steiner, Andrea Bowers, Mary Weatherford, Jennifer Rubell, Kembra Pfahler, Marilyn Minter, Clarissa Dalrymple, Anicka Yi, Juliana Huxtable, Christine Y. Kim, Liz Glynn, Lauren Cornell, and K8 Hardy.

The first season, filmed at Los Angeles art galleries Regen Projects and Night Gallery, premiered in July 2014. The second season, filmed at the New Museum in New York, premiered in February 2015 and was included in the 2015 New Museum Triennial. Ovation also produced five special episodes on location at Art Basel in Miami Beach in December 2014.

== Season 1 ==
No.	Title	Guests	Summary
1	Pilot	Catherine Opie (artist), Bettina Korek (curator & advocate), Jori Finkel (New York Times)	Is art for everyone? Do women still have to be naked to get into the Met? Do rappers, actresses and Shia LaBeouf make better art?
2	Postmodernism, Post-Net & the Art Market	Michelle Papillion (curator), Mary Weatherford (artist), Carol Cheh (curator & writer)	Is art evil? Is the internet dead? Why is everything so PoMo?
3	Queer Art, Eco Art, Race & Art	Kenturah Davis (artist), Andrea Bowers (artist), Jori Finkel (New York Times)	Aren’t we all gay after all? Shan’t whites discuss race? Can the art world save the planet before it’s underwater?
4	Art X Entertainment, Art V. Porn, Art N' Fashion	A.L. Steiner (artist), Andrea Bowers (artist), Emma Reeves (Museum of Contemporary Art, Los Angeles)	Should art be entertaining? What’s the difference between art and porn? What’s up with all the artists collaborating with fashion designers?
5	Art School, Insider Vs. Outsider Art, The Art Establishment	Mieke Marple (Night Gallery), Sarah Watson (Sprüth Magers), Christine Y. Kim (LACMA)	Why do people go to art school? What’s the difference between insider and outsider art? Who decides what IS art?
6	Muses, Disposability, Social Media	Mara McCarthy (The BOX Gallery), Hunter Drohojowska-Philp (art critic at KCRW), Tierney Finster (artist/muse)	Do muses still exist? Is disposability the new artistic medium? How uncool is social media?

== Season 1.5 (Miami) ==
No.	Title	Guests	Summary
1	Art & Business	Linda Yablonsky (Artforum), Elena Soboleva (Artsy)	Casey Jane Ellison heads to Art Basel Miami Beach to probe the business end of the Art World.
2	Miami Vices	Sarah Gavlak (Gavlak Gallery)	¡Bienvendo! Casey Jane Ellison heads to Art Basel Miami Beach to eat the fruits, smoke the vegetation and eat the panini that are Miami.
3	Art Networking	Jennifer Rubell (artist), Bettina Korek (curator & advocate)	Casey Jane Ellison heads to Art Basel Miami Beach to network with everyone who is anyone in the Art World, while also attempting to avoid her ex AND stalk her crush.
4	After Dark	Future Brown	Casey Jane Ellison heads to Art Basel Miami Beach to see how the Art World blows off steam after buying and selling art all day.
5	The Miami Effect	Liz Glynn (artist), Pamela Echeverria (Labor Gallery), Marilyn Minter (artist)	Casey Jane Ellison heads to Art Basel Miami Beach to uncover some of the important projects and ideas emerging out of the fair, and to show us that it’s not just about money, partying and high-class escorts

== Season 2 ==
No.	Title	Guests	Summary
1	Biennials & Triennials	K8 Hardy (artist), Juliana Huxtable (artist), Shelley Fox Aarons (collector)	What is a bi/triennial, who are they for, and what if this is where Casey peaks?
2	Terrorism & the Global Market	Anicka Yi (artist), Fabienne Stephan (Salon 94 Gallery), Leilah Weinraub (CEO, Hood by Air)	What’s more powerful, art or terror? Or is it love? Why does freedom of speech piss off so many violent hateful b*tches? Also, did you know Asia didn’t consider photography fine art until like 10 years ago (according to something Casey read)?
3	Art Criticism, Journalism & Gossip	Kembra Pfahler (artist), Clarissa Dalrymple (curator), Lauren Cornell (New Museum)	Does art need criticism? Is art writing for crybabies only? Why crush artists for no reason?
