= Bartending school =

Education for bartenders

Bartending school refers to private education businesses that teach individuals the many intricacies of serving customers alcohol from behind a bar. This includes not only classes in such topics as drinks mixology: the intricacies of mixing drinks and drink presentation, and the alcohol laws of the city and state, or province, in which the school is situated.

In the United States, bartenders must pass a certification course for their particular state. There are many bartending schools in every state. Some offer only a few hours of instruction, others offer up to 100 hours. Courses that are at least 12 hours in length are certified by a state's board of education or board of vocational or postsecondary education.

In Canada, bartending schools can be found in each province. Many of those schools offer introductory one day courses in addition to two week long certification courses. No specific regulatory body offers bartending certification, but each province has an additional responsible serving program that all wait staff need to complete before serving alcohol.

== Curriculum ==
Modern schools offer training in how to deal with drunk driving, underage drinkers, and aggressive customers. This is often required for certification.

Students also learn how to run a bar including setup and cleanup. In addition, students learn the basics about glassware and bartending equipment, as well as brands of liquors and liqueurs, recipes for the most popular drinks (mixology), and drink presentation.They may also trained in customer service, up-selling to customers, and procedures in taking payment. Most schools also offer training in resume preparation, how to act at a job interview, and where they should start looking for employment.

Many bar schools have their students train using colored water to simulate the various types of alcohol, while others use real liquors. Some schools also have mock bars behind which their students can train in a realistic way.

== History ==
Bartending has been a profession since ancient Roman times. There was no need for a bartending school up until the 1700s because alcohol only consisted of beer, wine and ale rather than mixed drinks. The owners of ale houses and taverns would serve alcohol and train new service staff themselves.

After the repeal of prohibition in 1933, stand alone bars and bars in restaurants reopened, and it was necessary for businesses to hire bartenders en masse. It was no longer possible for an individual barman to educate the new workers, and so for the first time bartending schools were founded. According to a brief news blurb in Reading Eagle from 1934, "bartender schools are mushrooming in the manor of Tom Thumb golf courses a while back". One school offered a "three weeks course in rudimental drink mixing, fashioning the multiple concoctions of pre-prohibition.” Classes consisted of one and a half hour periods, five days a week.

Bartending schools were popular in a variety of cities around the United States for decades. In 1955, jobs in service occupations like nursing and bartending surpassed farm work as the third largest category of employment in the economy.

The Columbia Bartending Agency was founded at Columbia University in 1965. Other universities such Yale and the University of Michigan have had bartending schools since the 1970s. Typically, these students work at student unions.
