= Surface (magazine) =

American magazine

- CEO: Marc Lotenberg
- Categories: architecture, design, fashion
- Founded: 1993
- Company: Surface Media
- Country: United States
- Based in: New York City
- Language: English
- Website: www.surfacemag.com
- ISSN: 1091-806X

Surface is an American publication covering design, architecture, fashion, culture and travel; with print and digital publications. The publication has an online presence through the Design Dispatch daily newsletter, as well as through social media.

== History ==
Surface was founded in 1993 by Richard Klein and Riley Johndonnell. The magazine was based in San Francisco until 2005, when the main offices were relocated to New York City.

In 1994, Surface was described by Vanity Fair as one of 10 “upstart magazines to watch”. In 1997, Surface introduced its inaugural Avant Guardian issue, which focused on the Avant Guardian Awards, a fashion photography competition. Winners have advanced to work for fashion houses such as Giorgio Armani, Hermès, Banana Republic, Nike, IBM and Levi's—as well as fashion magazines such as Vogue and Elle, and general interest magazines such as Harper’s Bazaar, Mademoiselle, and The New York Times Magazine.

Leaders in fashion and design industries selected 10 finalists annually to have their work featured in a fashion spread and at a launch event. For several years, the competition was expanded to include designers. Between 2011 and 2013, the Avant Guardian was on hiatus, but was revived again in 2014 and 2015, for photographers only. The 15th and final Avant Guardian issue was published in October 2015.

In 2009, the publication was acquired by Quadra Media. In 2011, Surface was sold to Sandow Media.

In 2012, Surface magazine was acquired by Eric Crown, co-founder and current chairman emeritus of the Arizona-based company Insight Enterprises. Surface Media LLC was formed in 2014.

Under CEO Marc Lotenberg and editor-in-chief Spencer Bailey, Surface Media has launched new ventures, including Design Dialogues and Surface Studios. Surface remains a voice in the design industry.

With the June/July 2013 issue—Bailey's first as editor—Surface unveiled a major design overhaul created in partnership with the consultancy Noë & Associates. Contributing editors who joined during Bailey's first year included Valerie Steele, the director and chief curator of The Museum at the Fashion Institute of Technology; Bettina Korek, an arts advocate, writer, and the founder of ForYourArt; and architect and designer David Rockwell.

Contributors have offered provocative comments. Wolfe has published highly successful novels and journalism related to New York real estate and society. In the June/July 2016 issue, former New York Times reporter Jayson Blair criticized the media for its failure to have real-time fact checking and to point out lies stated by presidential candidate Donald Trump.

== New additions ==
In 2013 Surface launched the "Design Dialogue" talk series, in which editor-in-chief Spencer Bailey discusses design topics with featured international designers and brands.

In 2015, editor-in-chief Spencer Bailey said that new columns would be added to the magazine, focusing equally on the craftsmanship of fashion and design. These new columns include Detail, which looks at garment and textile detail; Taste, in which a thought leader shares a current personal interest; How It's Made, intended to replace the yearly issue of the same name; Executive, in which an executive discusses the convergence of business and creativity; and Dialogue, a conversation between two creatives. In February 2016, Surface released its first Builders Issue, which focuses on real estate development and architecture.

In 2015, Surface was nominated for ASME's Best Style & Design Cover.

In 2016, Surface Media also launched a licensing partnership SurfaceHotels.com and a custom publishing house Surface Studios. Surface Studios, before even creating a logo or media kit, has already secured more than $3 Million in contracts including a custom publication for the second-largest real-estate project in the United States, Brickell City Centre.

As a response to the global COVID-19 pandemic, CEO Marc Lotenberg and architect Winka Dubbeldam announced the launch of the Surface Summer School at Penn, a design challenge and competition in collaboration with the University of Pennsylvania Stuart Weitzman School of Design. The first partnership was the first its kind between a media company and an accredited university, the challenge invited students from Penn to respond to a brief for architectural and design solutions for a mobile medical testing unit for COVID-19.

== Events ==
Surface hosts events throughout the year, including art events during Art Basel in Miami, Florida; design events during NYC x Design, and VIP dinners.
