= Libreria Bookshop =

Bookshop in Spitalfields, London

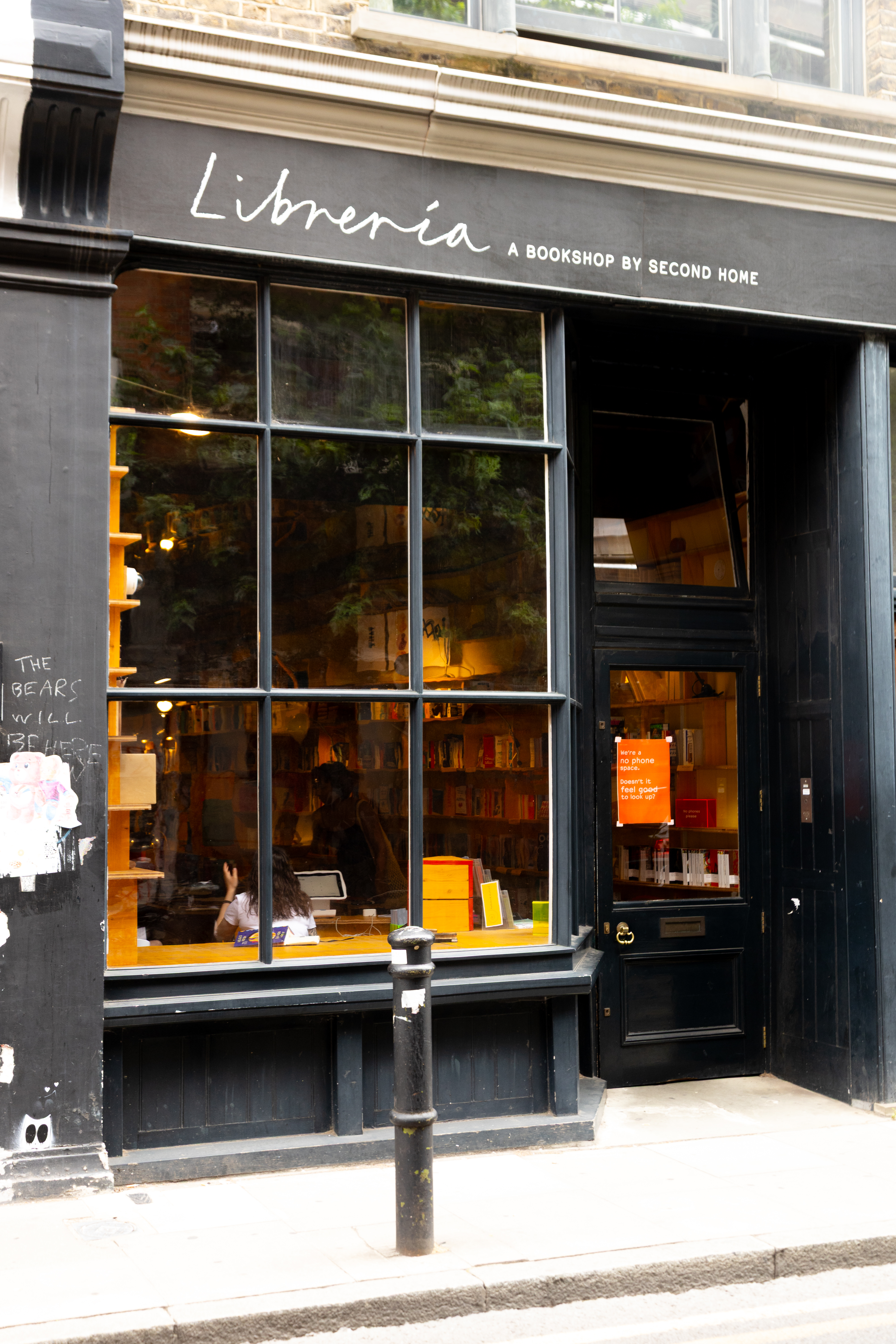
- Libreria in 2025.

General information
- Location: 65 Hanbury Street, London E1 5JL, England
- Coordinates: 51.520460274142025°N 0.0701548337262378°W
- Opened: February 2016

Design and construction
- Architect: SelgasCano

Website
- libreria.io

Libreria Bookshop is an independent bookstore, in the Spitalfields area of London, England, run by the London-based co-working space Second Home.

== History ==
Located on 65 Hanbury Street, the bookstore opened in February 25, 2016 as a project by Rohan Silva and Sam Aldenton of Second Home, with former Financial Times editor Sally Davies serving as its director.

Libreria's selection is organized not by genre and alphabet, like other bookstores, but rather by "suggestive themes designed to provoke browsers into making unexpected connections" in order to provide a sense of curation and discovery. Guest curators, like Jeanette Winterson, Shami Chakrabarti, and Richard Wentworth, among many others, have helped arrange some of the bookstore's shelves.

== Design ==
Designed by José Selgas and Lucía Cano of SelgasCano, the bookstore's architecture, with "Mirrored walls and ceilings" and floor-to-ceiling shelves, was based on the Jorge Luis Borges story "The Library of Babel." The architects wanted to use "irregular lines and reflective surfaces" to create the feeling of a labyrinth. Its bookshelves were handmade from recycled wood by students attending the Slade School of Fine Art. The entire bookstore is 83 square meters in total.

From its very beginning, the bookstore has designated itself as a digital-free zone, prohibiting customers from using their devices while inside. The New York Times stated that Librería was "Leading the rebels" with regard to such a policy soon taking hold in other London bookstores. BBC called it a "sanctuary from the bombardment of the modern digital world" without veering too far into "old-school" or "Luddite" territory.

In addition to selling books, the bookstore also hosts a printing press in its basement, provides a bar, and also opens itself up as a rentable venue for private events like screenings, dinners, workshops, and launches.

== Librería Poetry Bookshop ==
In 2018, Librería set up a "new poetry outpost" in collaboration with Faber & Faber at a Second Home in Holland Park.

== Accolades ==
Libreria Bookshop has been consistently named in articles about London's bookstores. Financial Times' readers named it one of the most brilliant bookstores in the world. Condé Nast Traveller named it one of the 15 best bookshops in London. Livingetc named it one of the seven best designed bookshops in London, calling it "something absolutely cinematic, mind-bending, and sci-fi-like." City A.M. called it one of the five best independent bookshops in London. Secret London named it in a list of London's charming bookshops. Time Out named it a brilliant London bookshop. Irish Independent called it "a small and beautiful alternative in a world of algorithms." Lonely Planet called it one of London's coziest bookshops. The Standard ironically called it "the most Instagram-friendly bookshop around" despite its no-phone policy.
