= Serpentine Galleries =

Art gallery in Hyde Park, London

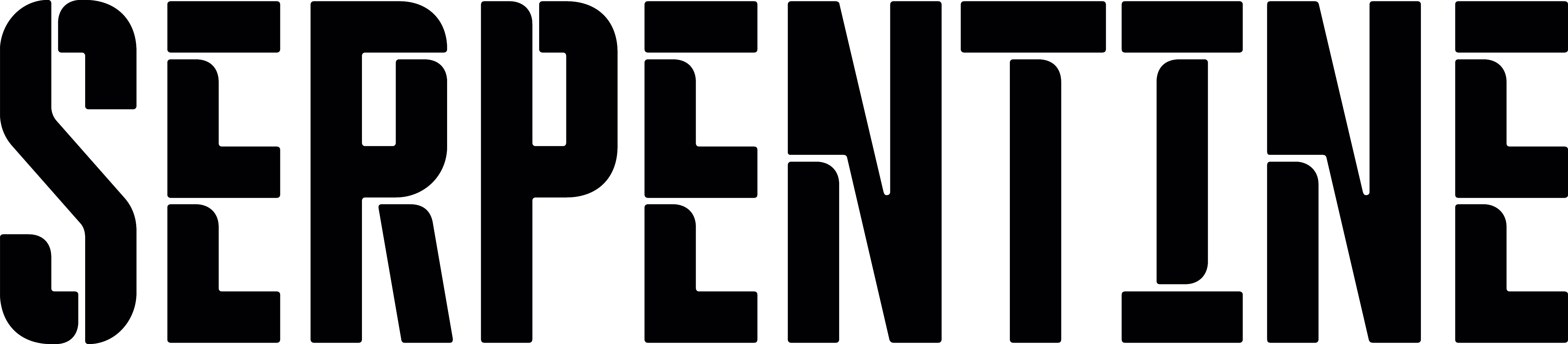

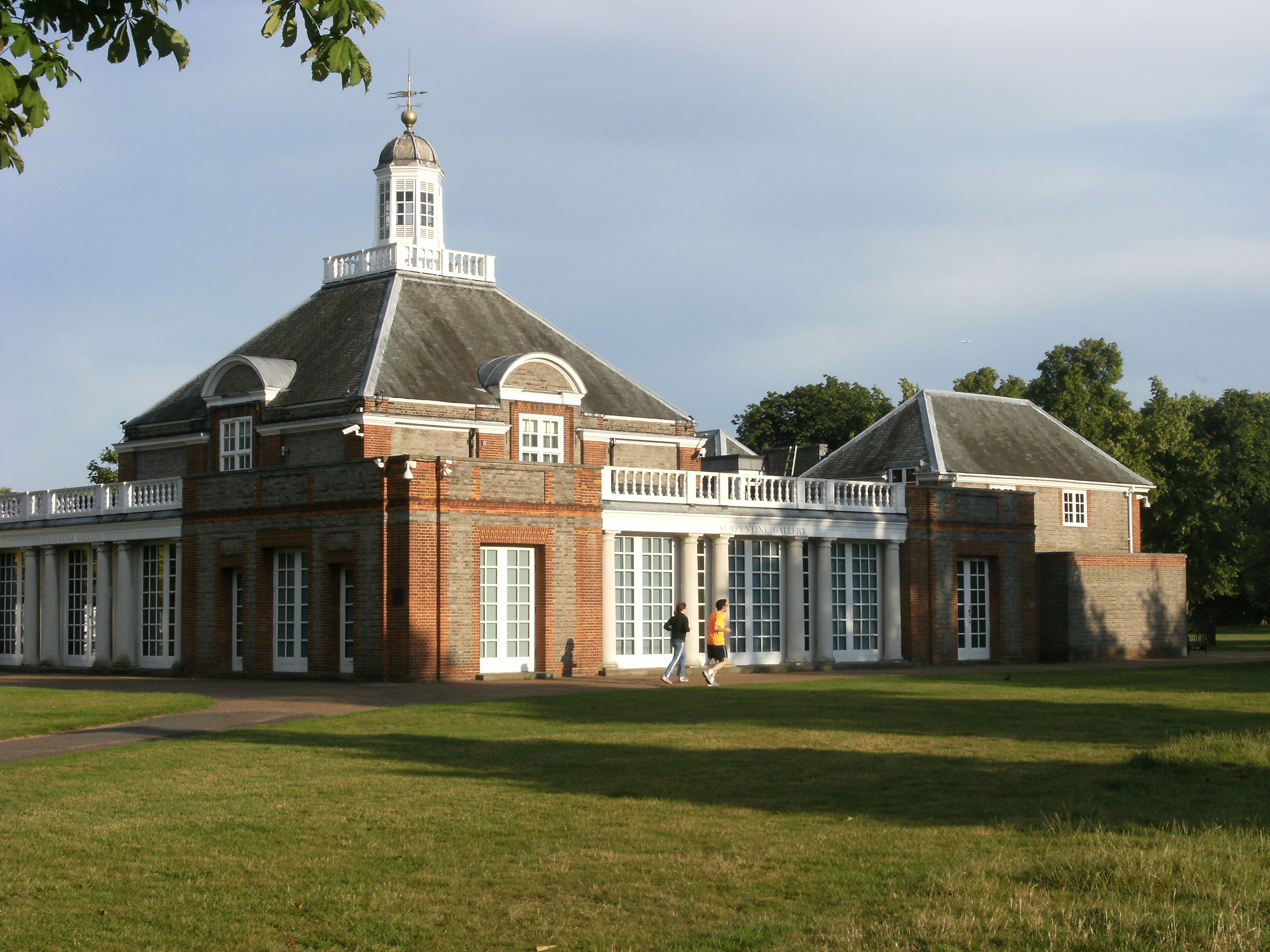

- Location within Central London
- Interactive map of area
- Established: 1970; 56 years ago
- Location: Kensington Gardens; Westminster, W2; United Kingdom
- Coordinates: 51.5047°N 0.1751°W
- Visitors: 1,187,621 (2016)
- Directors: Hans-Ulrich Obrist (CEO, Bettina Korek)
- Public transit access: Lancaster Gate; South Kensington
- Website: serpentinegalleries.org

The Serpentine Galleries are two contemporary art galleries in Kensington Gardens, Westminster, Greater London. Rebranded as Serpentine in 2022, the organisation is split across Serpentine South (previously known as the Serpentine Gallery) and Serpentine North (previously known as the Sackler Gallery).

The gallery spaces are within five minutes' walk of each other, linked by the bridge over the Serpentine Lake from which the galleries get their names. Their exhibitions, architecture, education and public programmes attract up to 1.2 million visitors a year. Admission to both galleries is free. The CEO is Bettina Korek, and the artistic director Hans Ulrich Obrist.

== Serpentine South ==
Serpentine South, previously known as the Serpentine Gallery, was established in 1970 and is housed in a Grade II listed former tea pavilion built in 1933–34 by the architect James Grey West. Notable artists whose works have been exhibited there include Man Ray, Henry Moore, Jean-Michel Basquiat, Andy Warhol, Paula Rego, Sondra Perry, Bridget Riley, Allan McCollum, Anish Kapoor, Christian Boltanski, Philippe Parreno, Richard Prince, Wolfgang Tillmans, Gerhard Richter, Gustav Metzger, Damien Hirst, Maria Lassnig, Adrian Berg, Jeff Koons and Marina Abramović. On the ground at the gallery's entrance is a permanent work made by Ian Hamilton Finlay in collaboration with Peter Coates, and dedicated to Diana, Princess of Wales, the gallery's former patron.

== Serpentine North ==
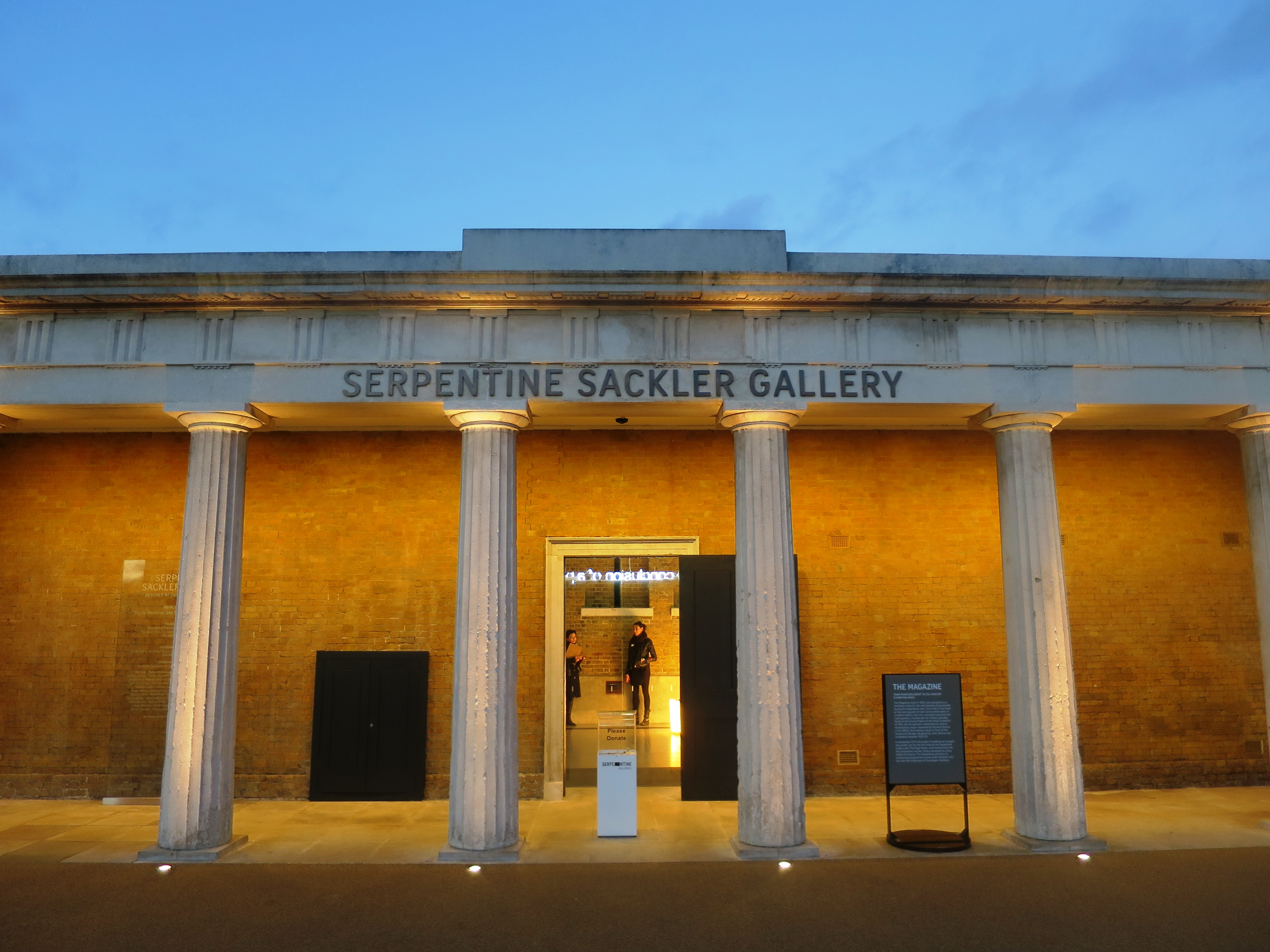
Serpentine North Gallery

In 2013, Serpentine North was opened to the public named as the Serpentine Sackler Gallery, a name changed to Serpentine North in 2021. This gave new life to The Magazine, a Grade II* listed former gunpowder store built in 1805, with the addition of an extension designed by Zaha Hadid Architects. Located five minutes' walk from Serpentine South across the Serpentine Bridge, it comprises 900 square metres (9,700 sq ft) of gallery space, restaurant, shop and social space. The Magazine Restaurant adjoins the gallery space.

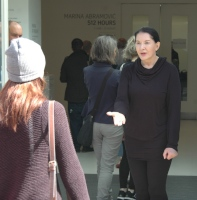
Marina Abramović on "512 Hours" project (2014)

== Pavilions ==
Every year since 2000, Serpentine has commissioned a temporary summer pavilion by a leading architect. The series presents the work of an international architect or design team who has not completed a building in England at the time of the Gallery's invitation. Each Pavilion is completed within six months and is situated on the Serpentine South's lawn for three months for the public to explore.

- 2000: Zaha Hadid
- 2001: Daniel Libeskind
- 2002: Toyo Ito
- 2003: Oscar Niemeyer
- 2005: Álvaro Siza and Eduardo Souto de Moura
- 2006: Rem Koolhaas
- 2007 pre-pavilion Lilias: Zaha Hadid and Patrik Schumacher
- 2007: Olafur Eliasson and Kjetil Thorsen
- 2008: Frank Gehry
- 2009: SANAA
- 2010: Jean Nouvel
- 2011: Peter Zumthor with Piet Oudolf
- 2012: Ai Weiwei and Herzog & de Meuron
- 2013: Sou Fujimoto
- 2014: Smiljan Radić Clarke
- 2015: Selgas Cano
- 2016: Bjarke Ingels
- 2017: Diébédo Francis Kéré
- 2018: Frida Escobedo
- 2019: Junya Ishigami
- 2021: Sumayya Vally, Counterspace
- 2022: Theaster Gates
- 2023: Lina Ghotmeh
- 2024: Minsuk Cho and his firm Mass Studies
- 2025: Marina Tabassum
- 2026: Amar Kanwar

== Gallery of temporary pavilions ==
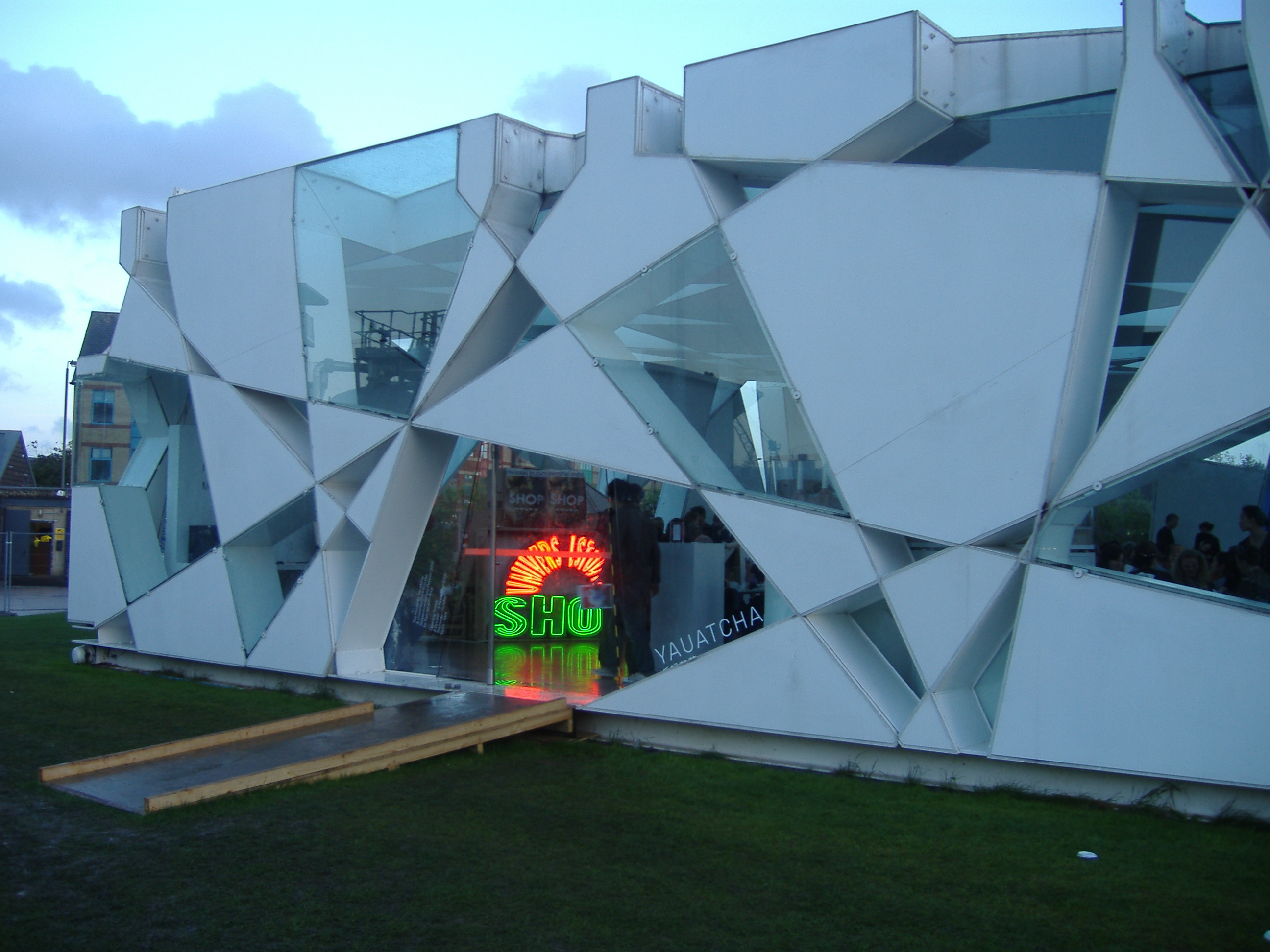
Toyo Ito (2002)

Rem Koolhaas with Cecil Balmond (2006)

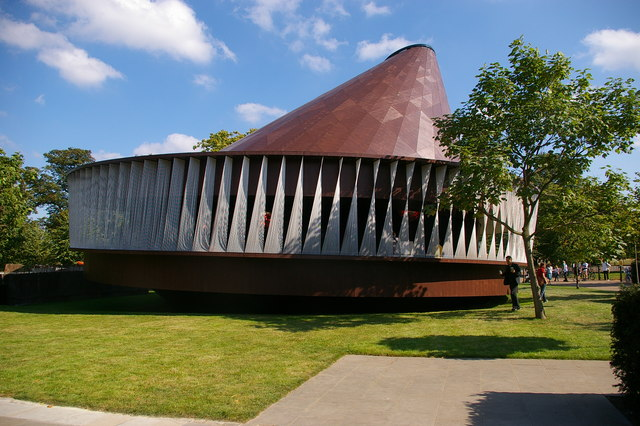
Olafur Eliasson and Kjetil Thorsen (2007)

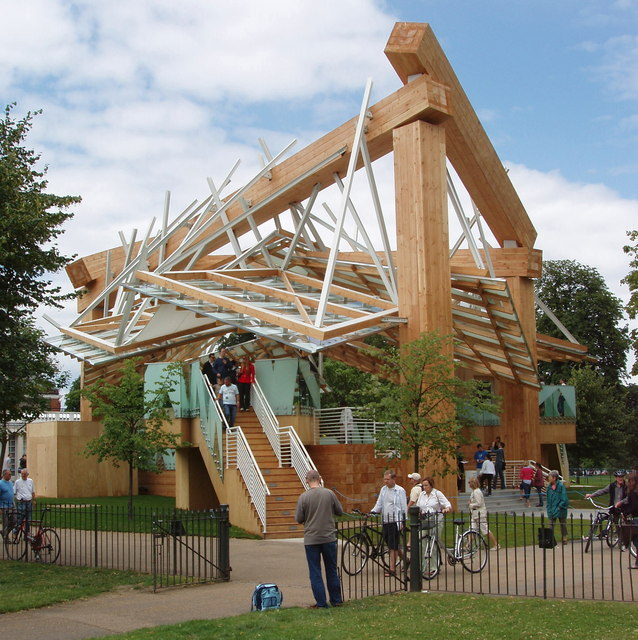
Frank Gehry (2008)

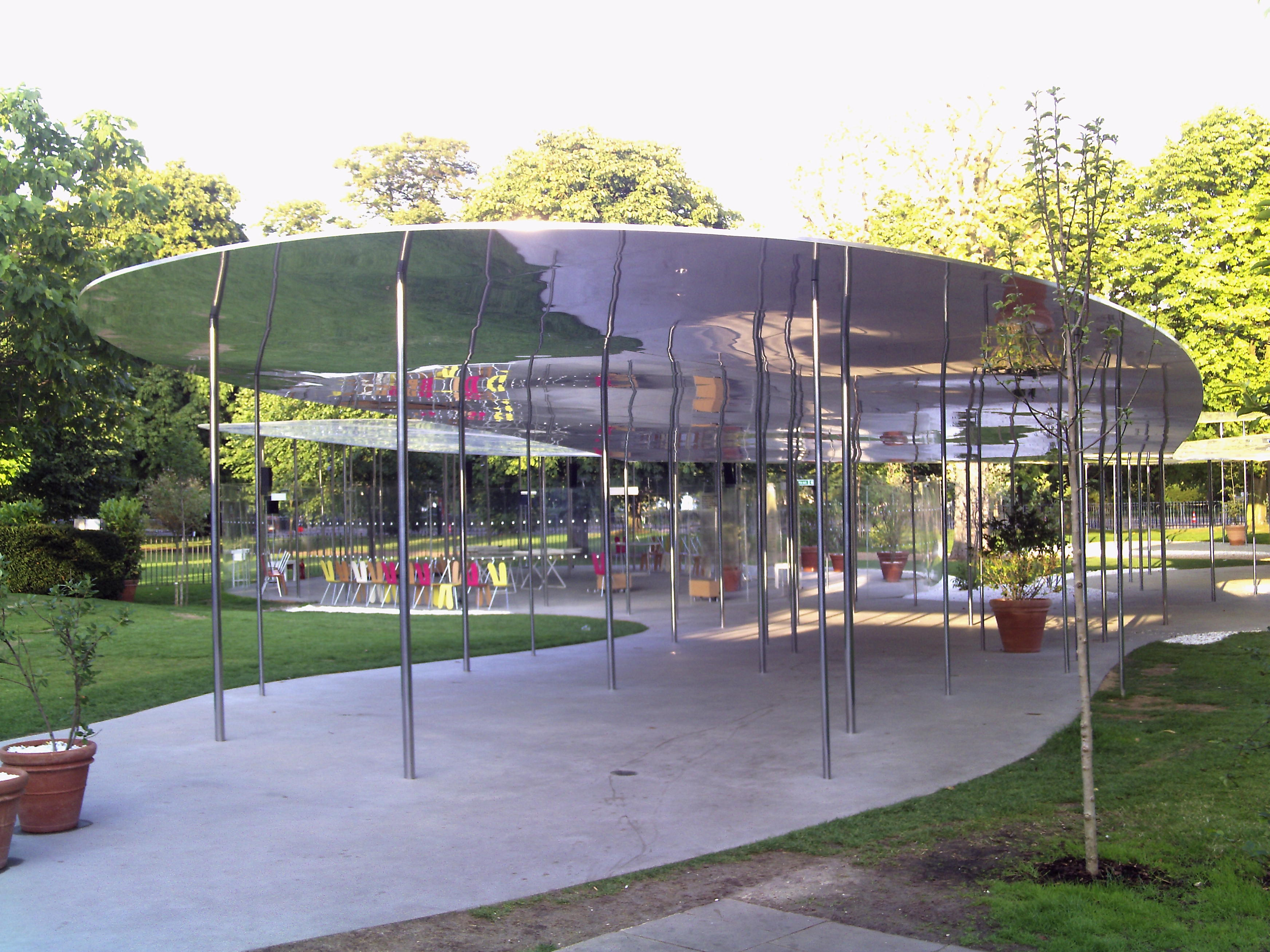
SANAA (2009)

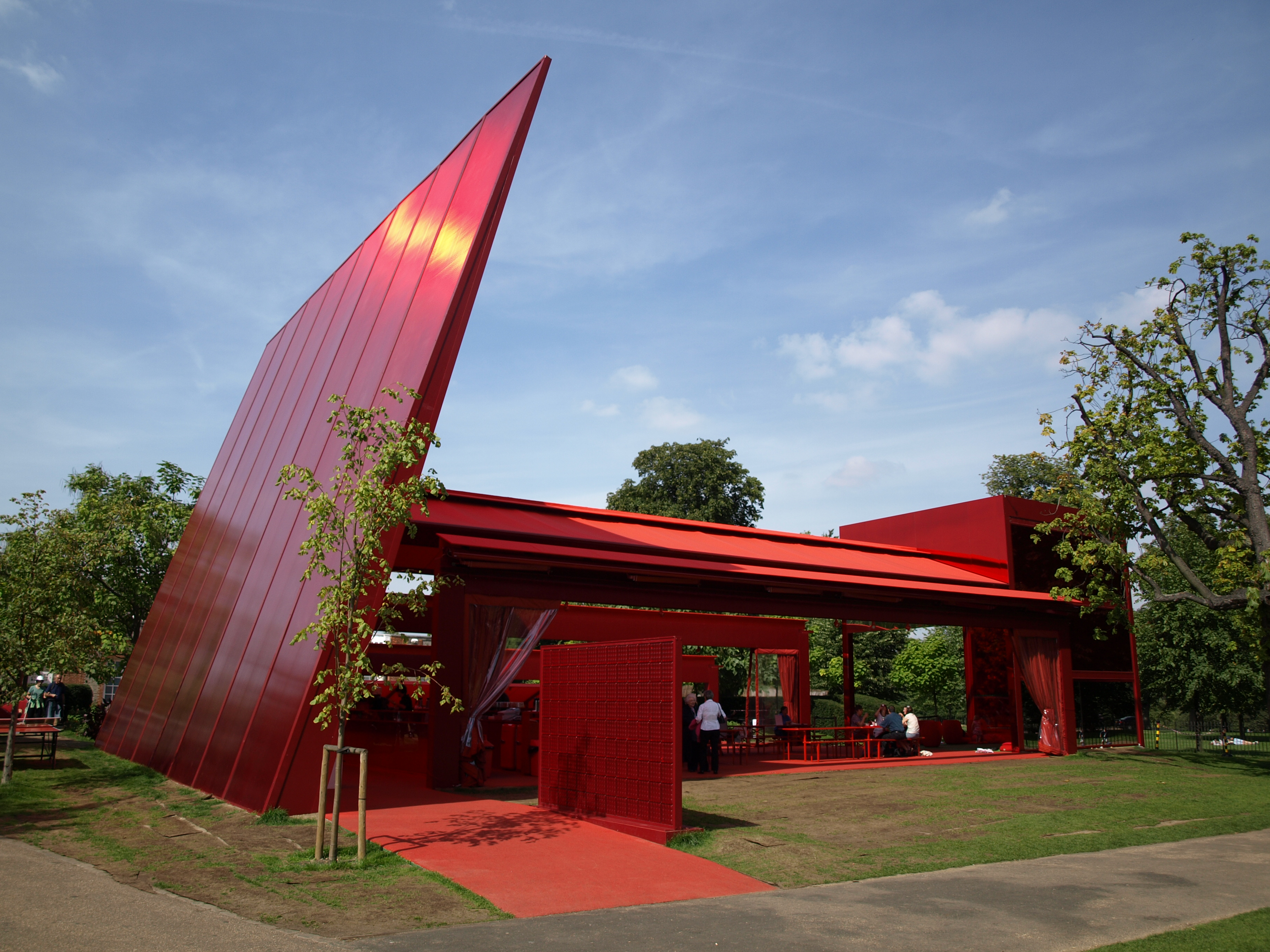
Jean Nouvel (2010)

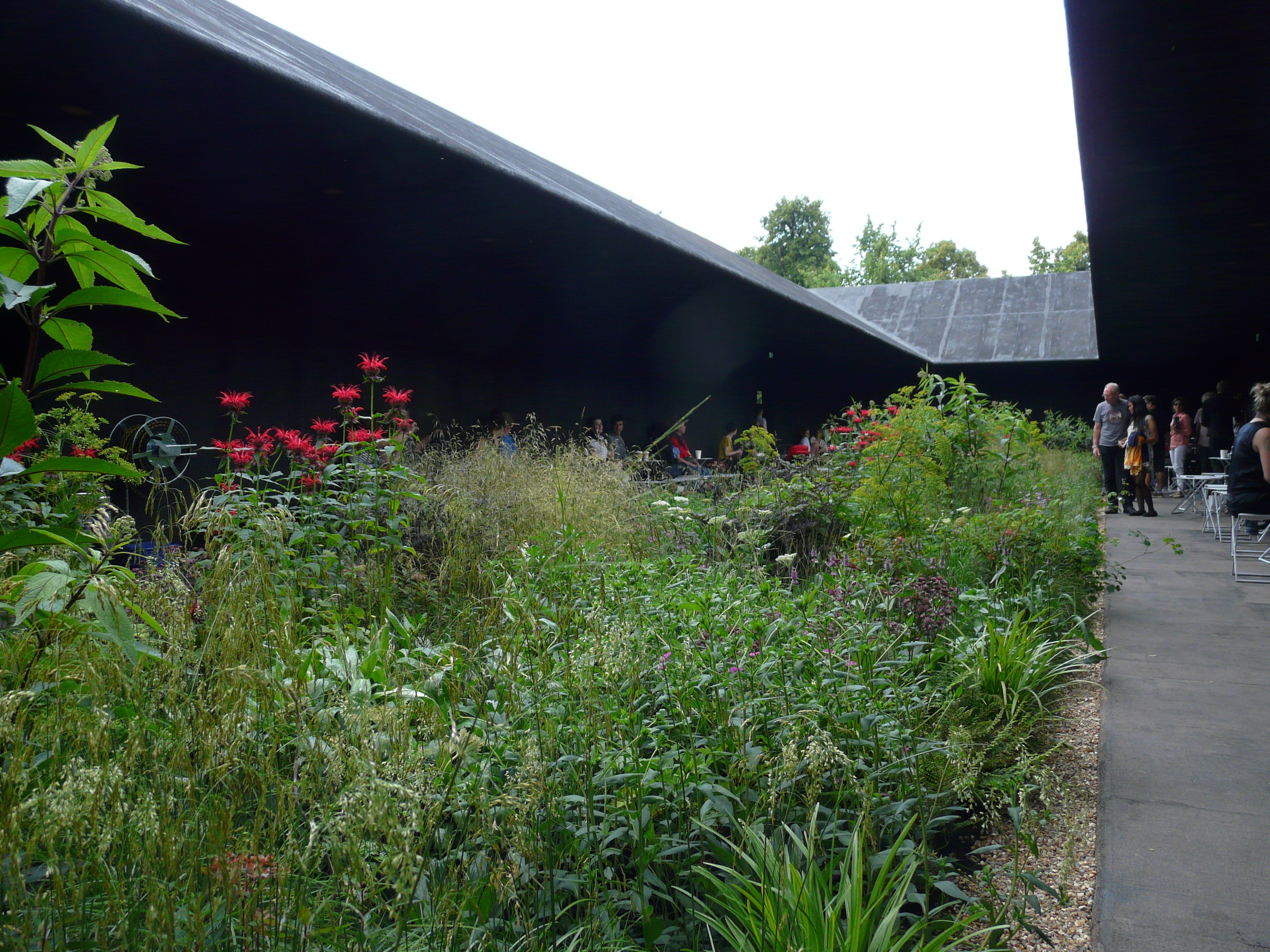
Peter Zumthor, with a garden by Piet Oudolf (2011)

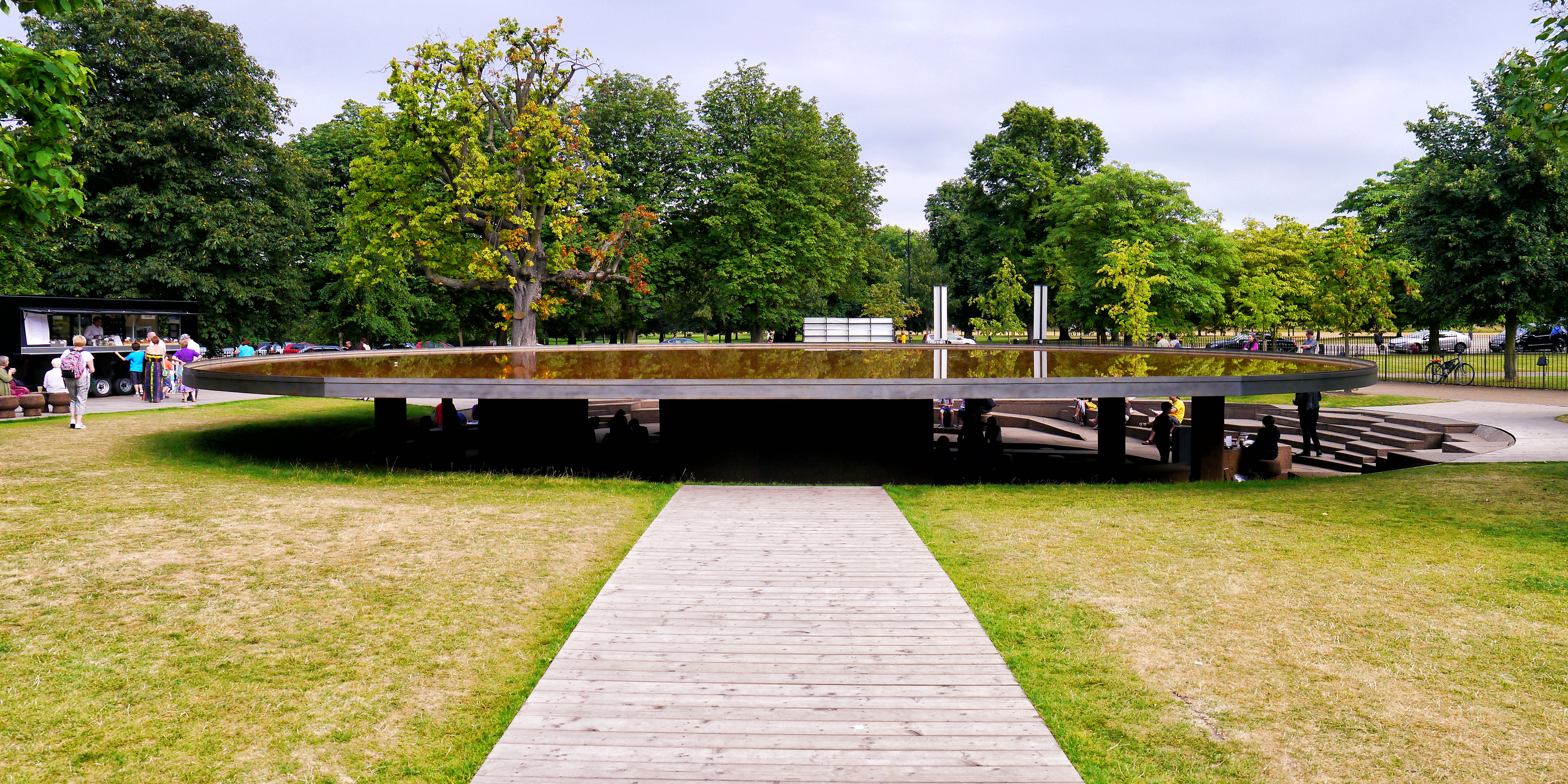
Ai Weiwei and Herzog & de Meuron (2012)

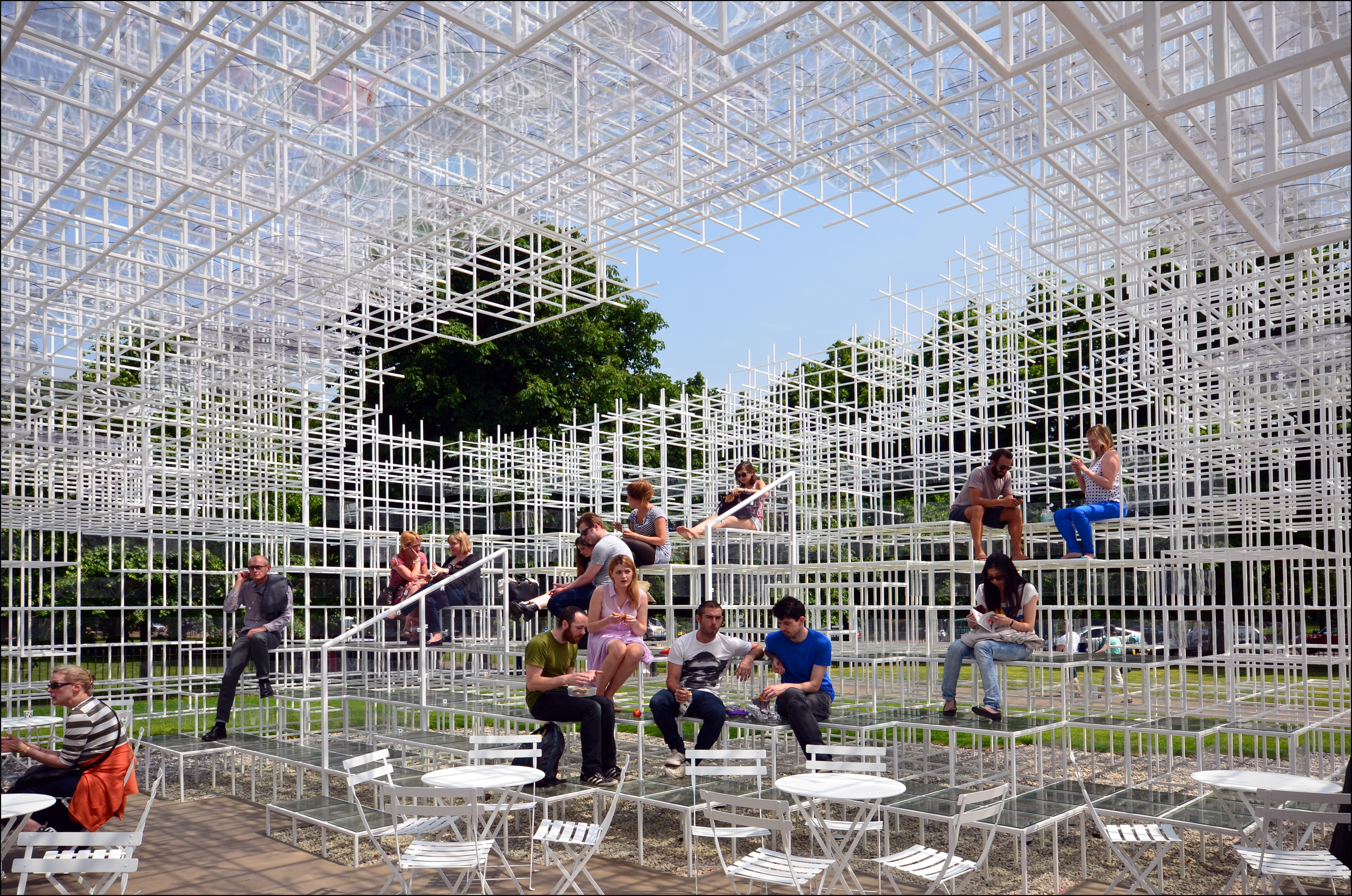
Sou Fujimoto (2013)

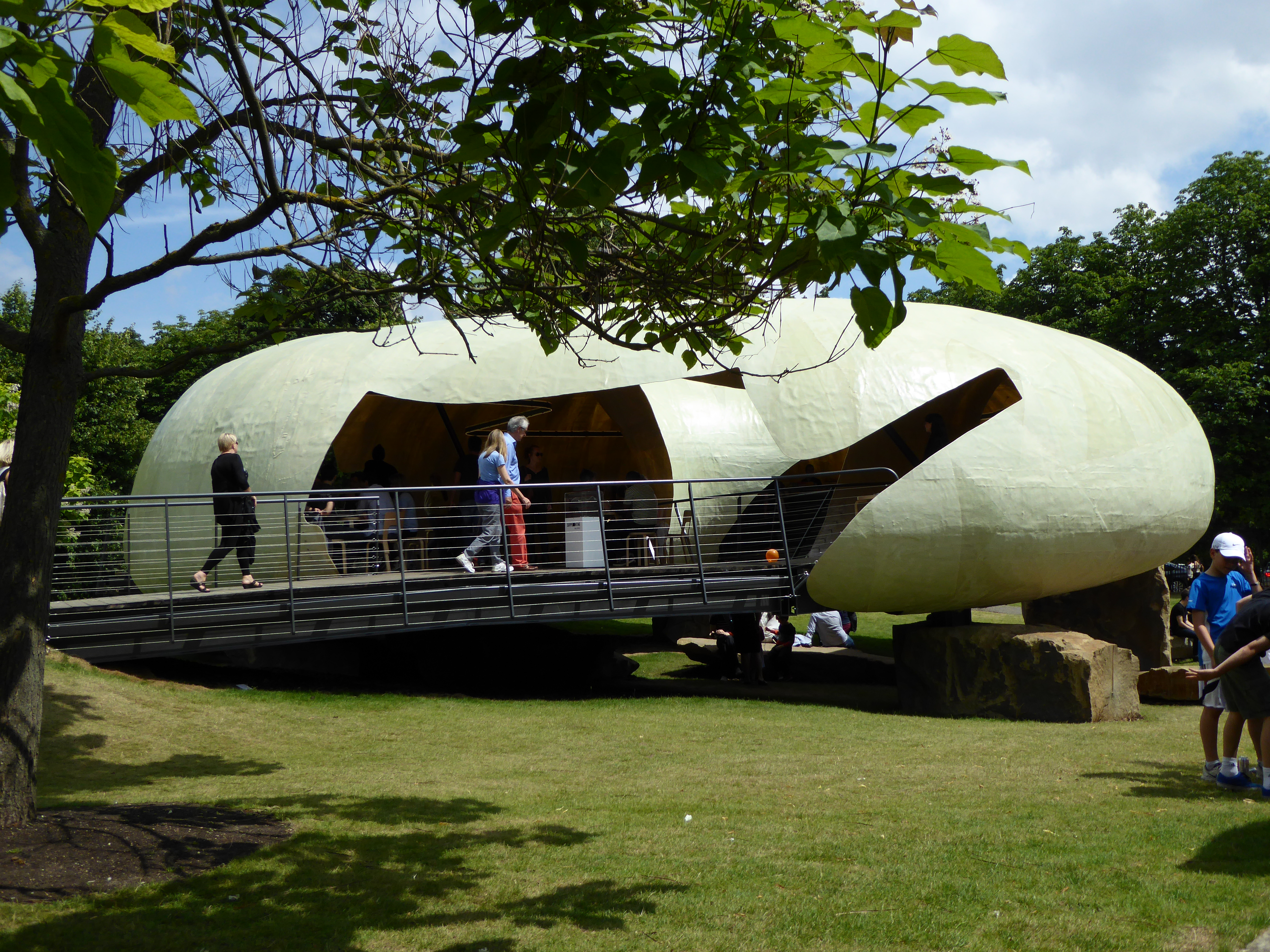
Smiljan Radić Clarke (2014)

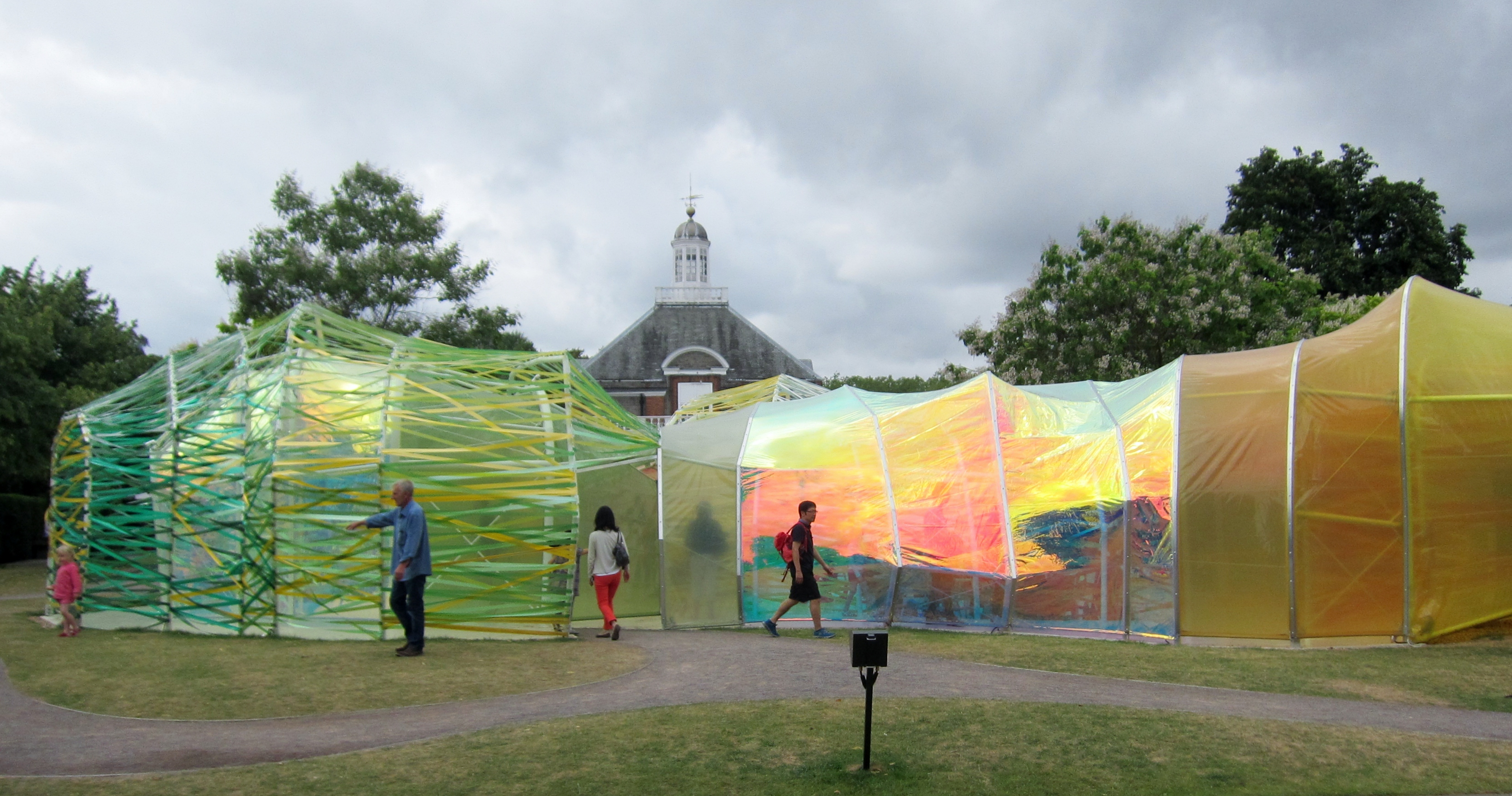
SelgasCano (2015)

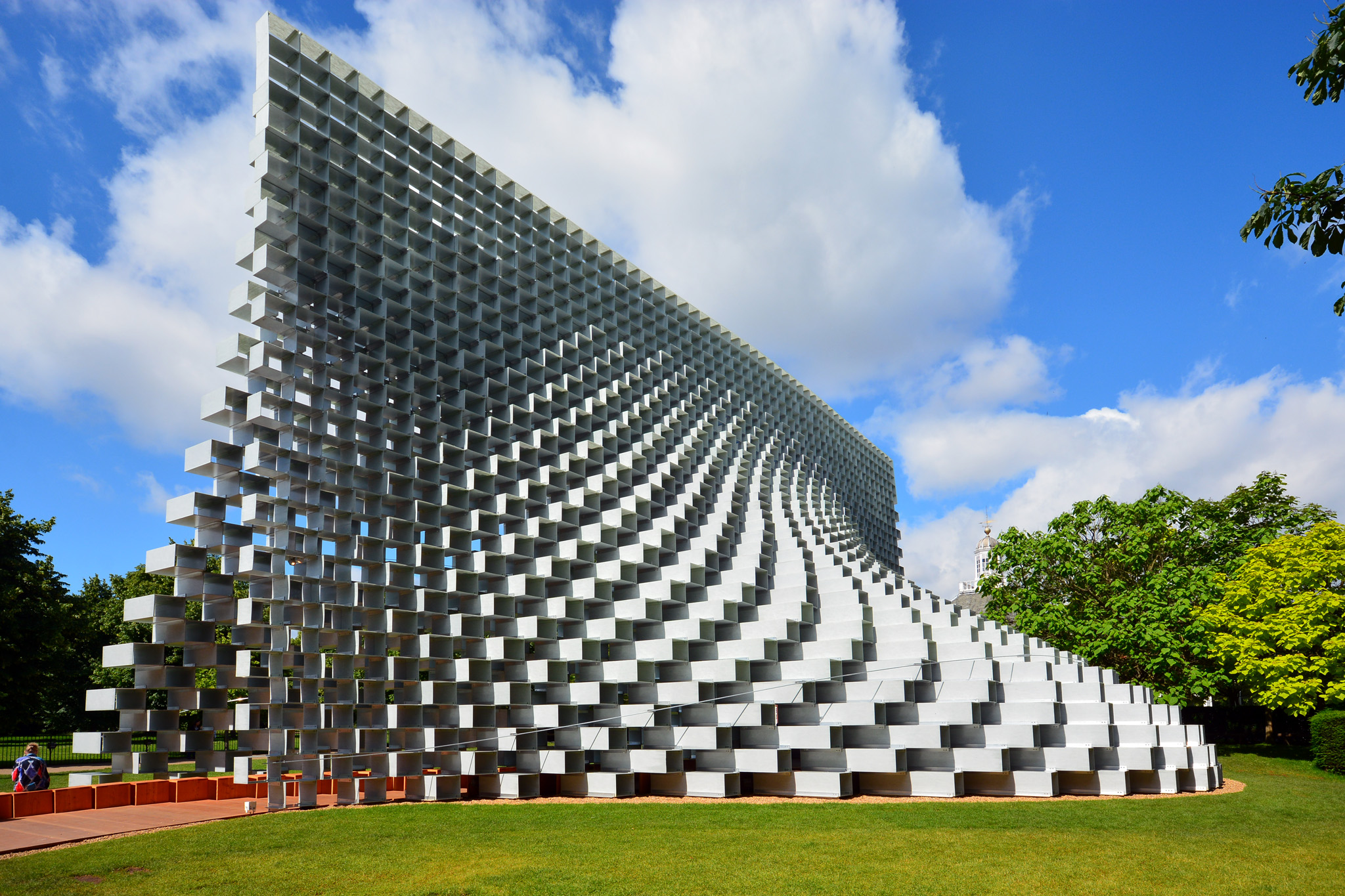
Bjarke Ingels (2016)

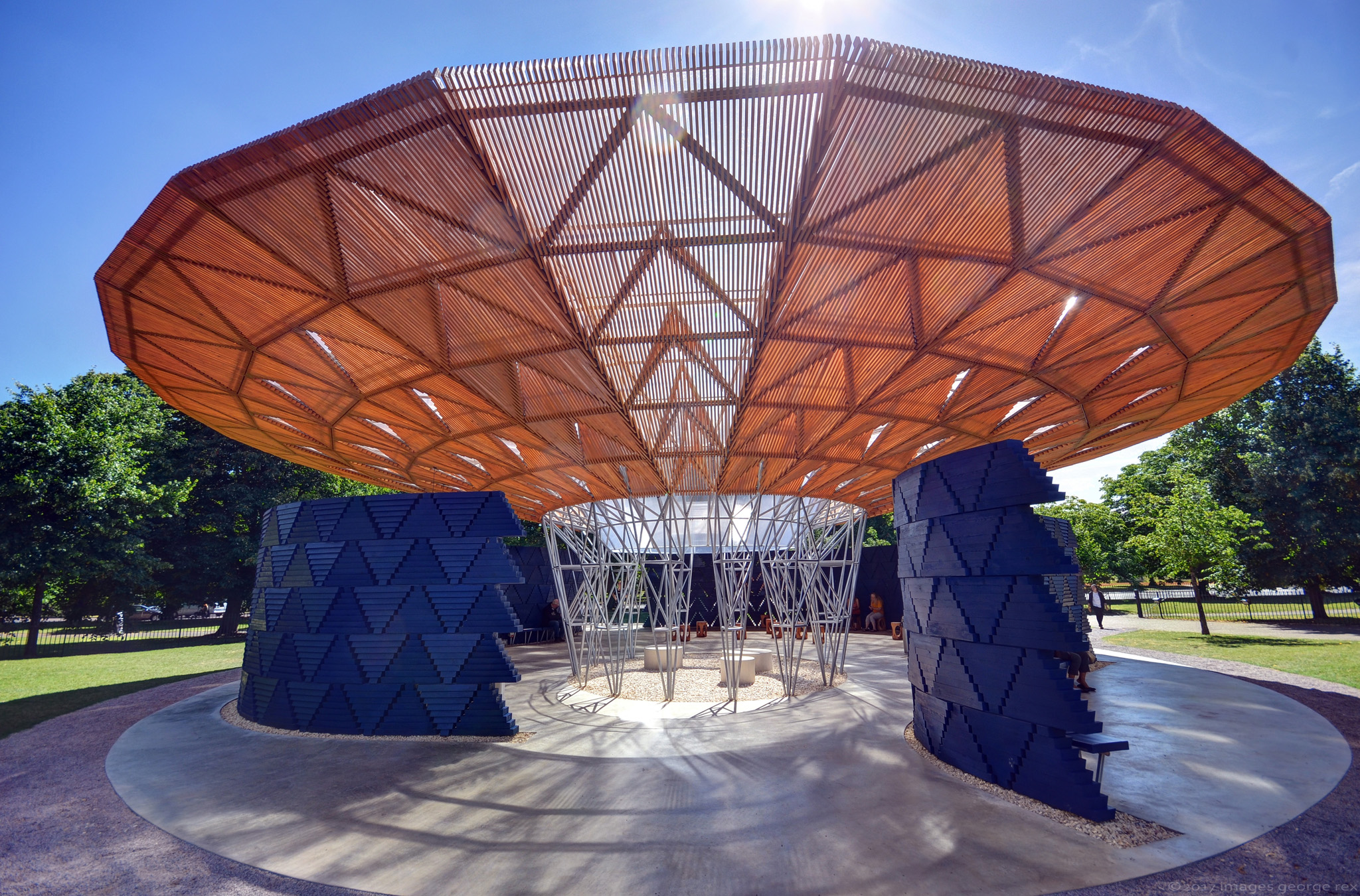
Diébédo Francis Kéré (2017)

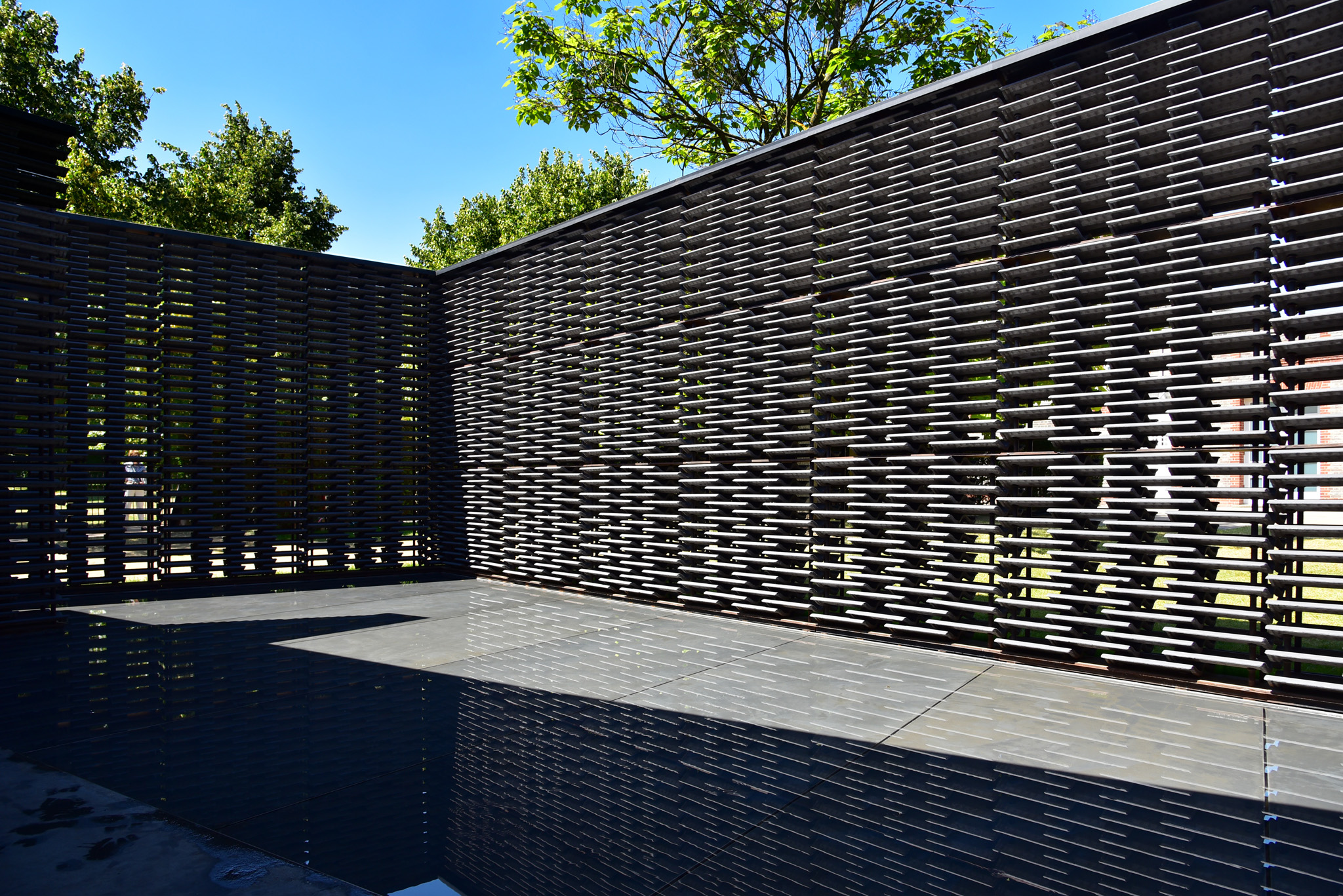
Frida Escobedo (2018)

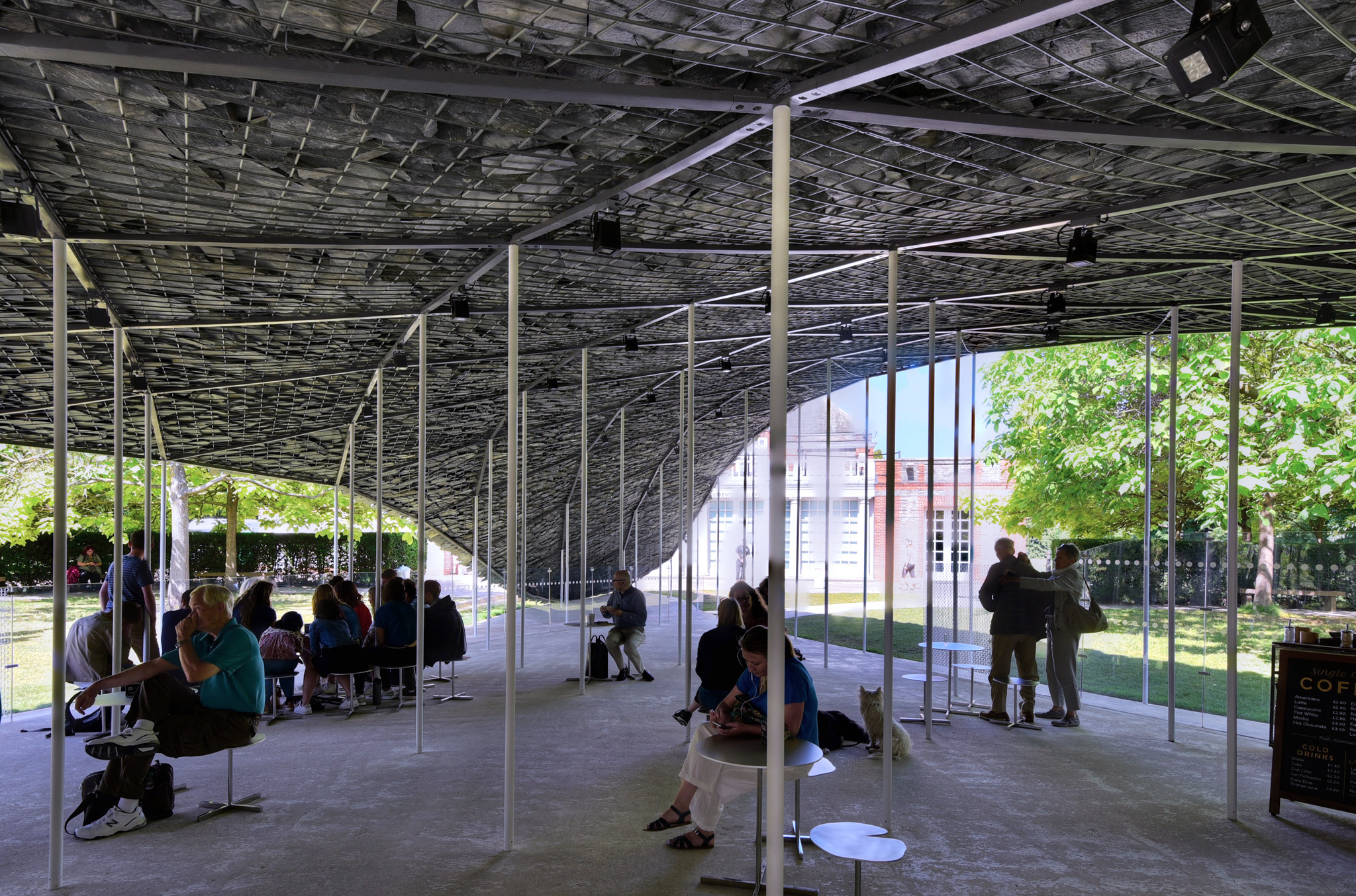
Junya Ishigami (2019)

== See also ==
- Serpentine x FLAG Art Foundation Prize
