= Mieke Marple =

American artist and writer

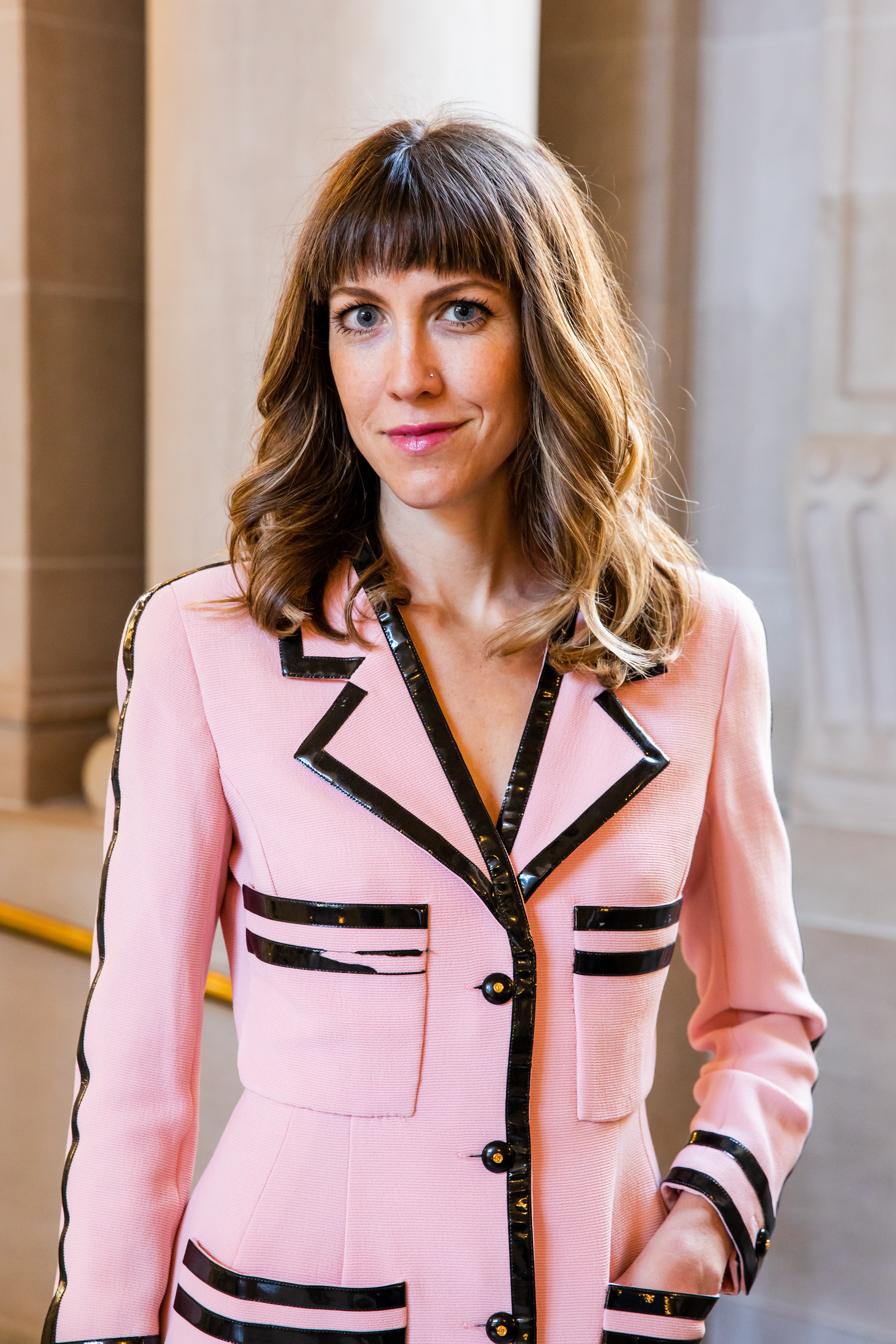
- Marple in March 2022
- Born: 1986 (age 39–40); Mountain View, California
- Education: University of California, Los Angeles (BA)
- Known for: Campaign Director to Dan Greaney's 2028 presidential campaign
- Website: miekemarple.com

Mieke Marple (born 1986) is an American artist and writer. Based in Los Angeles, she currently serves as campaign director for Dan Greaney's campaign in the 2028 Republican Party presidential primaries.

== Early life and education ==
Marple was born in Mountain View, California, and grew up in Palo Alto. She received a Bachelor of Arts in Fine Art from the University of California, Los Angeles in 2008.

== Career ==
Marple began her artist career as an intern at Blum & Poe and David Zwirner galleries. She worked as an artist assistant for the artist Karl Haendel and partnered with Davida Nemeroff on Night Gallery in 2011. While still at Night Gallery, she participated in art fairs like Frieze New York, Frieze London, Art Basel Hong Kong, and NADA Miami, and worked with artists like Sterling Ruby, Laura Owens, Samara Golden, and Josh Kline, among others.

In 2024, Marple began collaborating with clowns and comedians, such as Melinda Hill, on a painting and video series called Live, Laugh, Lube. Her work often combines current and new technologies, such as social media, augmented reality and NFTs, with more traditional practices. Her artwork has been exhibited at MOCA Westport, the Museum of Contemporary Art in Zagreb, Croatia, the Seattle NFT Museum, and other arts galleries and platforms. Her work has been featured in The New York Times,The Guardian, Autre, Fortune Magazine, Hyperallergic, and some others.

In 2014 and 2016, Marple organized "Sexy Beast", a fundraiser for Planned Parenthood LA, with Davida Nemeroff.

As a writer, Marple has published articles about arts and other topics with The Huffington Post, Los Angeles Review of Books, McSweeney's, Zyzzyva, Lit Hub, and other media platforms.

In 2026, Marple became the campaign director for Dan Greaney, a writer for The Simpsons who announced his run for President of the United States on May 26, 2026.

== See also ==
- Internet Archive
- Touching the Art
