= SelgasCano =

Spanish architect office

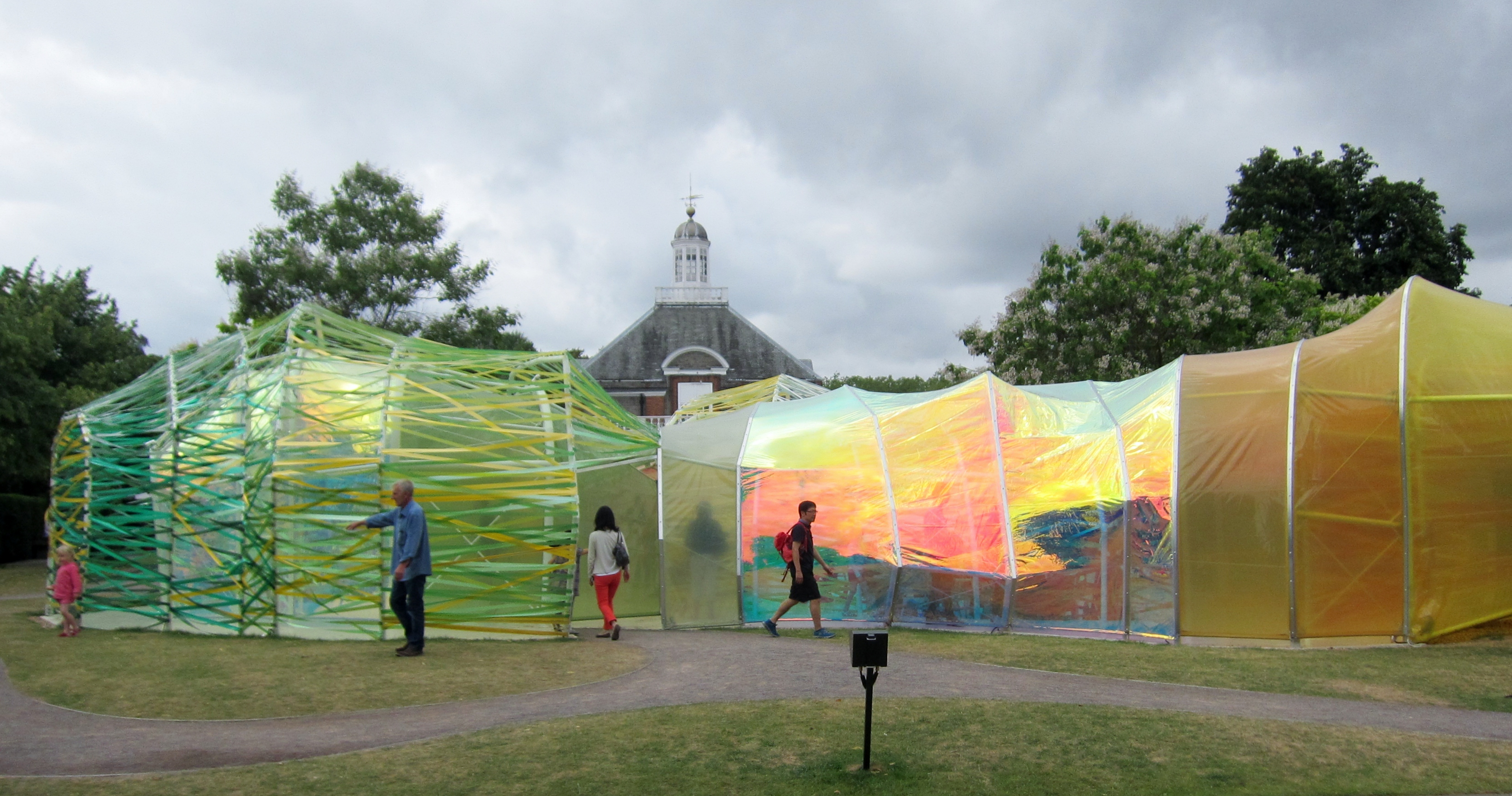
The Serpentine Pavilion of 2015

SelgasCano is a Spanish architectural office based in Madrid and founded in 1998 by José Selgas and Lucía Cano. The atelier focuses on the use of polychromy, creative exploration of new materials and the relationship between architecture and its surrounding landscape.

Their work includes three auditoriums and congress centers in Spain (Auditorio de Badajoz, Auditorio El Batel Cartagena and Auditorio de Plasencia); several office buildings such as Second Home London, Second Home Lisboa and Second Home Los Angeles, a school in Kibera, Nairobi, a vaccination center in Turkana, Kenya, and several public pavilions including the 15th annual Serpentine Pavilion 2015 in London, which was re-installed at La Brea Tar Pits in Los Angeles in 2019.

Selgascano´s office in the woods in Madrid is the most visited project in the specialized architecture website Archdaily,

Selgascano's work has been exhibited in MoMA, New York City; Bruges Trienal; Guggenheim New York; GA gallery in Tokyo; the MOT(Contemporary Art Museum of Tokyo; the Design Museum of London; the Akademie der Kunste in Berlin; the Tin Sheds Gallery in Sydney; the MIT in Boston; the Venice Biennale in Venice; and the Louisiana Museum in Copenhagen. Selgascano was awarded with the Kunstpreis by the Akademie der Künste in Berlin in 2013, as well as the Architects of the Year prize by the German Design Council in Munich.

== Background ==
José Selgas was born in Madrid in 1965. He graduated from ETSA Madrid in 1992 and has worked with Francesco Venezia in Naples from 1994 to 1995. He won the Rome Prize in the Spain Academy of Fine Arts in Rome 1997 – 1998.

Lucía Cano Pintos was born in Madrid in 1965. She graduated from ETSA Madrid in 1992 and has worked with Julio Cano Lasso, her father, from 1997 until 2001.

== Architectural practice ==
SelgasCano describes their architectural practice in the following way:

“The buildings that interest us are precisely the ones that establish a certain relationship with nature, not the ones that try to imitate or camouflage themselves in nature, but the ones that are in direct opposition or contradiction to it. Actually, instead of seeking a balance between nature and artifice, we think nature should prevail over artifice. In all our projects, we strive to give nature a greater presence than it had before our intervention. Otherwise, we would consider the project to be a failure. Again, we are less and less interested in architecture as a physical fact, and more interested in architecture as a sensitivity, as respect for what exists.”

In general, the studio works with as few people as possible in order to be able to fully control the quantity and the quality of the projects. SelgasCano works on various scales and typologies: Their portfolio includes installations, pavilions, small shops, single-family houses, office buildings, congress centers and auditoriums and large-scale park proposals.

One of the common denominators of their work is the way in which they deal with the plot: As theorist and critic Thomas Daniel states, “most of their buildings are not conventionally places on the ground, but appear to be floating in the air above the ground surface, like Mérida Factory, for example, or gently pressed into the earth below the ground surface, like EL ‘B’, in Cartagena”.

Another reoccurring theme is the use of color, their constant work with polychromy. As Christopher Turner, London Design Biennale director, states: “There is nothing superficial about SelgasCano’s use of colour – the Spanish duo’s pop-art playfulness has been integral to projects from east London to northern Kenya.”

A key factor in their work is also the use of unusual, industrial-grade materials, like ethylene tetrafluoroethylene (ETFE), polymethyl methacrylate (acrylic) and polycarbonate. The use of plastic in many buildings allows for lightweight, sometimes even translucent, façades.

José Selgas describes the work of the office in the following way:

“We like to be open to every possibility in every project. We come with open eyes and with the possibility to go in any direction. We are architects, not artists. We always try to bring something to the table that is beyond our personal thoughts. All of our projects incorporate different inputs that come from different directions, but typically, they’re always related to nature, climate, society, history, scale, and—more than anything—economy.“

== Selected works ==
=== Badajoz Congress Centre and Auditorium 2006 ===
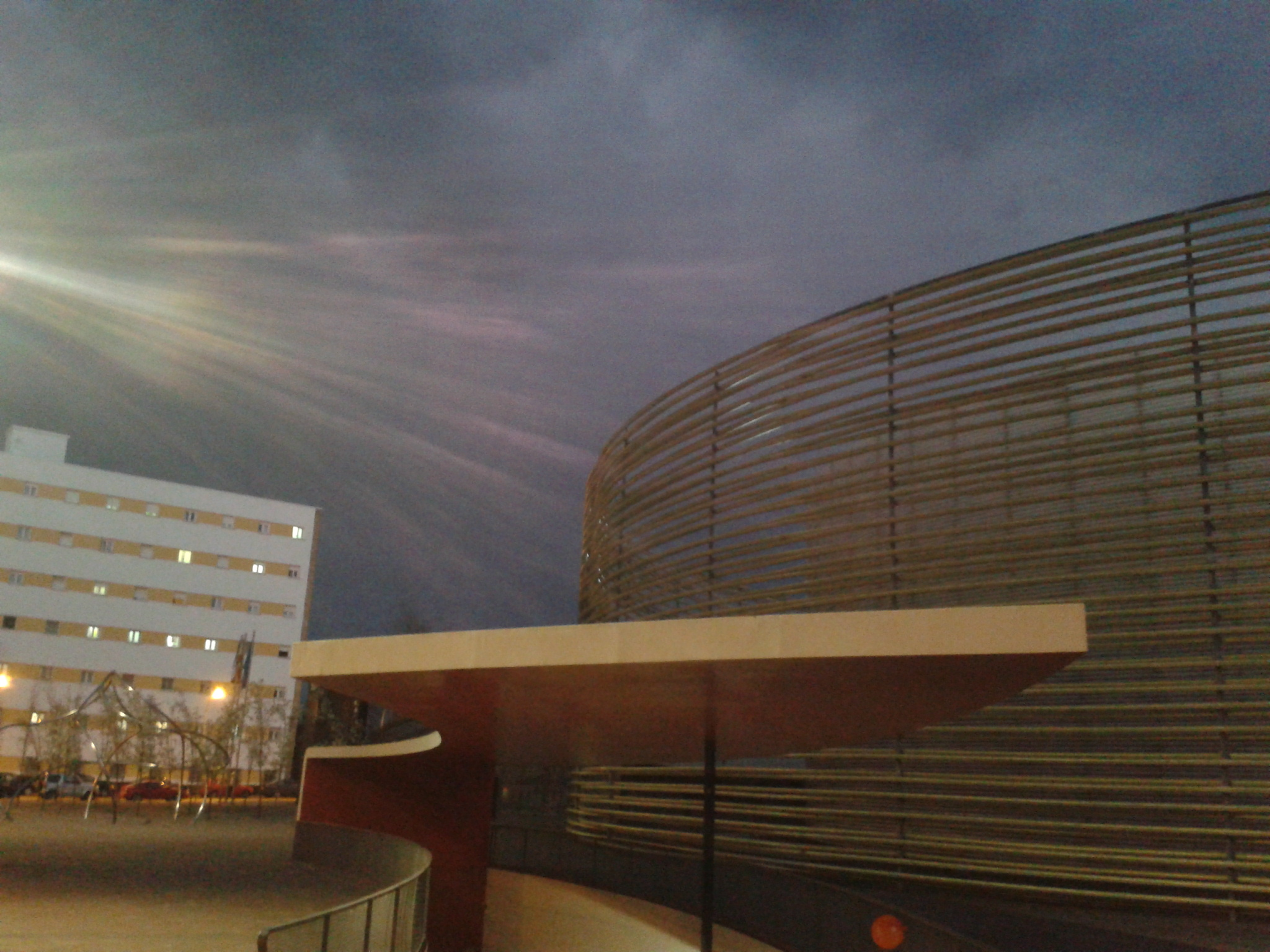
Badajoz Congress Centre and Auditorium

The Badajoz Congress Centre and Auditorium was built in Badajoz in 2006 on the remains of a bastion in the Vauban fortress, a plot of 17.000 m^{2}. A lot of the fortifications of the historic fortress were demolished in the mid-nineteenth century, as they had lost their defensive purpose. The fort had been remodeled into a bullring, which had become a ruin as well over the years. SelgasCano reused the remaining circular void by keeping the original lines for their proposal. The inner circle, which previously served as the arena for the bullring, became the auditorium, which is connected beneath the courtyard level to the outer circle. The courtyard itself corresponds to the ring of tiers of the bullring. It is now filled with Ailanthus shrubs, which is a local species of trees. The vast majority of the building is made out of two materials: Polyster/Fiberglass tubing and white Perspex tubes.

=== SelgasCano’s Office “Office in the woods” 2009 ===
The building is set in the only remaining free space on the plot in the woods near Madrid. In line with the studio’s reoccurring themes, the building is lowered into the ground. It also has a very specific scale, because José Seglas and Lucía Cano want the studio to stay small: The office consists of one room, which is only approximately 72 m^{2}, 4 meters in width stretching along 18 meters with a height of about 2.5 meters – 1.2 of which are below the ground – the office can only be accessed through stairs on the north side. The south-facing curved wall is constructed from a 110mm thick, insulated fiberglass and polyester sandwich, offering shade from direct sunlight, while the north-facing wall offers a view outside through its 20mm thick, curved window made of transparent acrylic.

=== Cartagena Auditorium and Congress Centre 2011 ===
==== Also named El B. (after the beach in front of it) ====
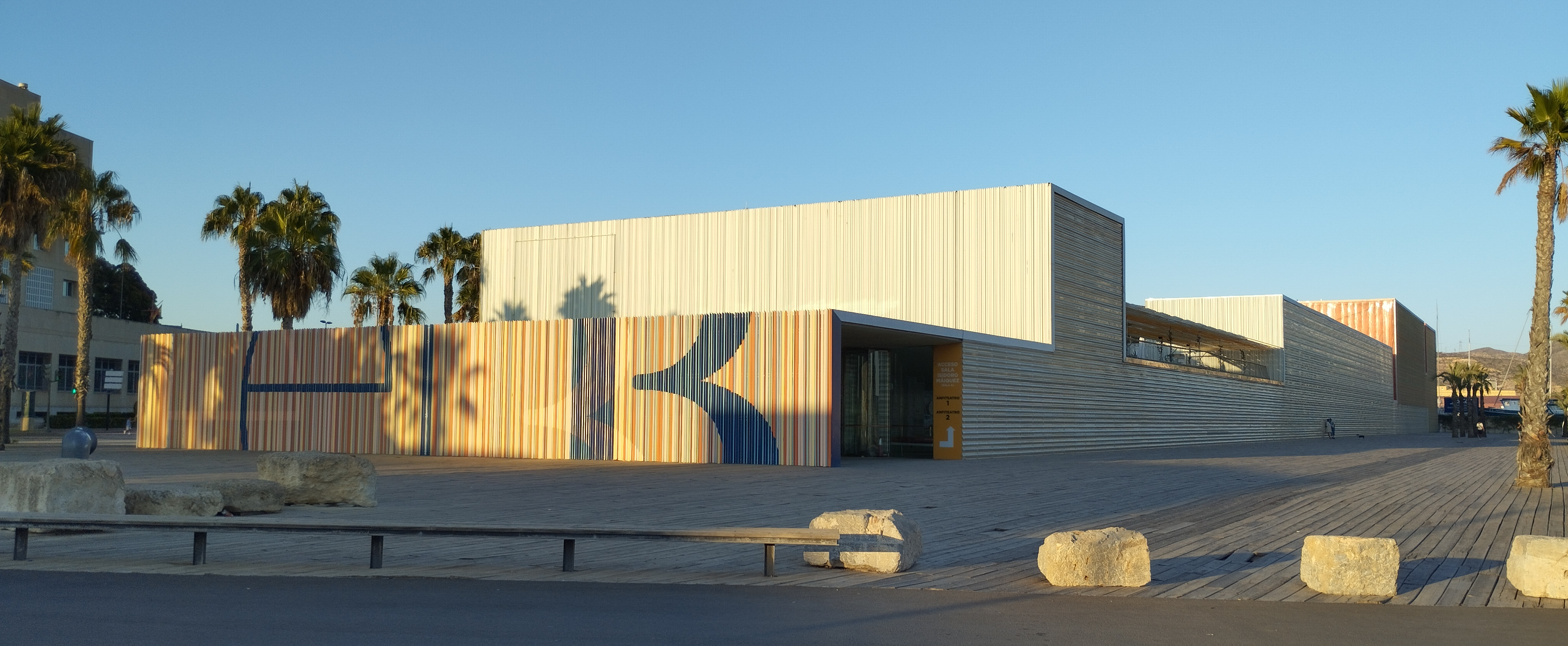
Cartagena Auditorium and Congress Centre

The Cartagena Auditorium and Congress Centre is situated at the end of a roughly one kilometre long harbour strip on the border between the city and the waterfront on a plot of 18.500 m^{2}. The site itself also played a defensive role historically, just like the site of the Badajoz Congress Centre and Auditorium. The proposal, according to the architects themselves, was aimed at preserving the relationship between the city and the sea - keeping 60% of the building below grade in order to achieve a height that is similar to the surrounding harbor buildings and keeps the line of sight from the city to the waterfront intact. While it’s outside consists of rigid lines, the interior is more architecturally articulated, with a promenade inside that connects two opposite entrances with the various programs that are housed within. Given the fact that Cartagena has Europe’s biggest polycarbonate factory, the main materials used in the skin of the building are polycarbonate and methacrylate.

=== Serpentine Pavilion 2015 ===
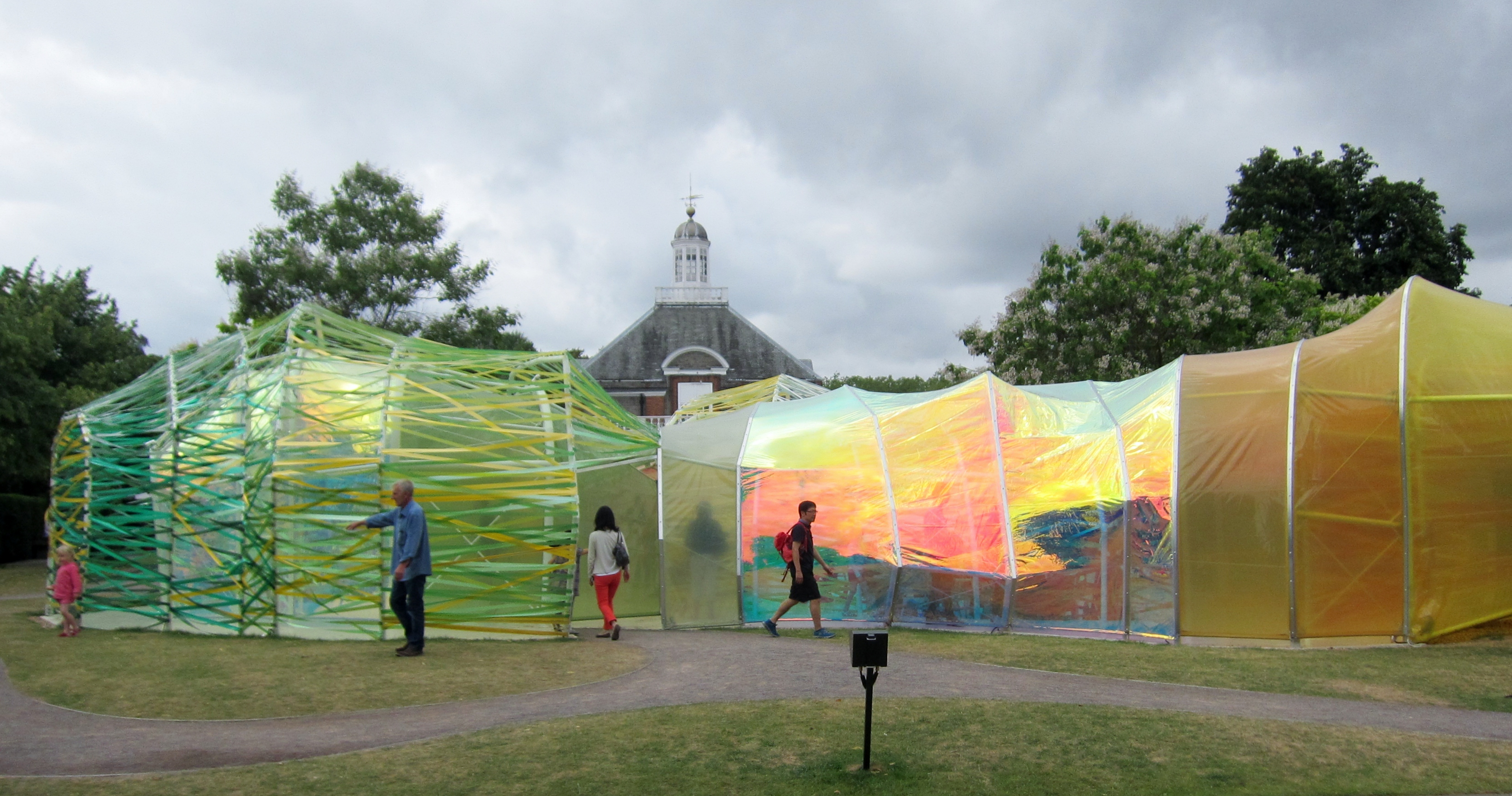
Serpentine Pavilion

The 2015 Serpentine Pavilion by SelgasCano showcased a colorful plastic design, consisting of a minimal steel frame wrapped in multi-colored ETFE sheet and webbing. The pavilion has a main internal space, which according to the architects is “referencing back to the multi-layered and chaotic network of the London underground, which is enveloped in corridors through which it can be accessed.” The Pavilion also hosted a café inside.

The project had to be built quickly, as all Serpentine Pavilions have to. In addition to that, an experimental design is fundamental for every Serpentine Pavilion proposal. This combination of actualities in this case led to a constructional flaw: Due to a leak in the ETFE structure, the café was not shielded against London weather conditions anymore – letting rain into the interior space where the café had its counter. This structural failure has led to condemning reviews, one of which, titled “A clown’s sleeve” was published by Robert Bevan in the London Evening Standard, claiming that “Selgascano’s offering is amongst the Serpentine’s least successful pavilions, not helped by the Spanish architects’ late realization that the brief is not just for an art installation but a functioning summer café and party venue.”

=== Plasencia Auditorium and Congress Centre 2017 ===
The Plasencia Auditorium and Congress Centre is situated on the edge of the town of Plasencia, which had gradually undergone a process of urbanization in which the town had been built artificially elevated. The site for the project is on the outskirts of this urbanized area within the surrounding natural landscape, which is 18 meters below street level. The aim was to keep the footprint of the building at its minimum, therefore organizing the program vertically. The building is connected to the street by a ramp, which ends in an open lobby that also acts as a lookout to the natural surroundings, establishing a visual relationship between the city and nature. The building houses an auditorium, a café, a multipurpose room and an exhibition room. Those rooms are stacked on top of each other, connected by a circular path. The form of the building is often described as “a giant, boulder-shaped volume [that] emerges out of the undulating terrain”. The outer shell is made out of a translucent ETFE, which reveals the interior pathways especially when lit during the night.

== Projects ==
- UIB Library – Palma de Mallorca, Spain – 2003 (Competition)
- 55 Dwellings in Amsterdam – Amsterdam, Netherlands – 2003 (Competition)
- Housing and offices in an existing building – León, Spain – 2004 (Competition)
- Las Palmeras Park – Garrucha, Botanical Garden, Almería, Spain – 2004 (Competition)
- 112 Emergency Call Centre – Mérida, Badajoz, Spain – 2006 (Competition)
- Badajoz Congress Centre and Auditorium – Badajoz, Spain – 2005 to 2006
- Madrid Penal Court Building – Madrid, Spain – 2007 (Competition)
- Water supply tank in Villar Del Rey – Badajoz, Spain, 2007
- Supercom offices – Santiago de Compostela, Spain – 2008 (Competition)
- Sanchinarro Market – Madrid, Spain – 2008 (Competition)
- Congress Centre, Vitoria – Álava, Spain – 2008 (Competition)
- Silicon House – Madrid, Spain – 2006 to 2008
- Office in the woods – Madrid, Spain – 2006 to 2009
- Factory Mérida – Badajoz, Spain – 2006 to 2011
- “El B.” Cartagena Auditorium and Congress Centre – Murcia, Spain – 2001 to 2011
- Amidst the air, Installation at the 13th Venice Biennale – Venice, Italy – 2012
- Eyewear shop Cartagena – Murcia, Spain – 2010 to 2013
- Transport interchange and archeological park, Yenikapi – Istanbul, Turkey – 2012 (Competition)
- Second Home London Office – London, UK – 2014 to 2015
- Serpentine Pavilion – London, UK – 2015
- “Helloeverything” Kibera Hamlets – Nairobi, Kenya – 2016
- Second Home Lisbon Office – Lisbon, Portugal – 2016 to 2017
- Librería – London, UK – 2016
- Plasencia Auditorium and Congress Centre – Cáceres, Spain – 2005 to 2017
- Second Home Holland Park – London, UK – 2017
- Martell Pavilion – Cognac, France – 2017
- Brugge Triennale Pavilion – Brugge, Belgium – 2018
- Second Home Hollywood Office – Los Angeles, USA – 2019

== Awards ==
- Kunstpreis by the Akademie der Künste in Berlin, Germany – 2013
- Architects of the Year prize by the German Design Council in Munich, Germany – 2013
