= King-Size Homer =

- The Simpsons episode
- A grossly overweight Homer operates his computer from the couch with a broom.
- Episode no.: Season 7 Episode 7
- Directed by: Jim Reardon
- Written by: Dan Greaney
- Production code: 3F05
- Original air date: November 5, 1995

Guest appearance
- Joan Kenley as the telephone lady

Episode features
- Chalkboard gag: "Indian burns are not our cultural heritage"
- Couch gag: The Simpsons are five malfunctioning wind-up dolls who waddle their way to the couch.
- Commentary: Matt Groening; Bill Oakley; Josh Weinstein; Dan Greaney; Jim Reardon; David Silverman

Episode chronology
← Previous "Treehouse of Horror VI"	Next → "Mother Simpson"
- The Simpsons season 7

"King-Size Homer" is the seventh episode of the seventh season of the American animated television series The Simpsons. It originally aired on Fox in the United States on November 5, 1995. In the episode, Homer despises the nuclear plant's new exercise program and decides to attain a weight of 300 pounds (136 kg) so he can claim a disability and work from home.

The episode was written by Dan Greaney and directed by Jim Reardon. Joan Kenley makes her second of three guest appearances on The Simpsons in the episode as the voice of the telephone lady. It features cultural references to the world's heaviest twins, the 1993 film What's Eating Gilbert Grape, the 1977 film A Bridge Too Far and the soft drink Tab.

Since airing, the episode has received positive reviews from fans and television critics, and Empire named it the best episode of the series. It acquired a Nielsen rating of 10.0 and was the third-highest-rated show on the Fox network that week.

== Plot ==
Mr. Burns organizes a compulsory morning calisthenics program at the nuclear power plant, to Homer's dismay. After learning that an employee who is disabled can work from home through worker's compensation, Homer unsuccessfully tries to injure himself. Upon learning that employees who weigh 300 pounds (136 kg) or more qualify as disabled, he begins eating excessively, despite Marge and Lisa's repeated warnings that he is endangering his health. With Bart and Dr Nick's help, Homer eventually increases his weight from 239 pounds (108 kg) to 315 pounds (143 kg) and Mr. Burns installs a stay-at-home work terminal in the Simpson house. Marge admits that she finds herself less attracted to Homer physically because of his weight gain, but he vows to prove he can be a better worker because of it.

Homer soon tires of his monotonous responsibilities as a safety inspector and resorts to simply typing "yes" every time the system prompts him. Looking for shortcuts, he leaves his terminal with a drinking bird to press the Y key to indicate "yes" on the keyboard and goes to the movie theater. After being denied admission due to his weight and getting teased by people outside the theater, Homer returns to his station to find that his bird has fallen over and a nuclear meltdown is imminent unless the system is manually shut down.

Unable to call the plant because his fingers are too fat to dial a telephone keypad, and too heavy to drive or skateboard, Homer resorts to hitchhiking. Drivers refuse to pick him up because his bright muumuu and frantic jabbering make him seem like a lunatic. After carjacking an ice cream truck, Homer arrives at the power plant during a workout program and reaches the shutdown switch, which is situated over a tank of radioactive gas that is about to explode. He falls onto the hatch just as it bursts open and becomes stuck in it from the waist down, blocking the gas from escaping. In recognition of Homer's bravery and action to minimize the environmental damage caused by the gas release, Burns gives him a medal and offers him any reward he chooses. Homer asks Burns to help him lose weight, having seen the effect his obesity has had on his family. After Homer demonstrates his inability to do any exercise, Burns gives up and decides to simply pay for him to get liposuction, much to Homer's delight.

== Production ==
"King-Size Homer" was written by Dan Greaney, and directed by Jim Reardon. It was the first episode Greaney wrote for The Simpsons. Prior to this episode he was working as a lawyer and was contemplating moving to Ukraine to work for a start-up company. He said that this episode "saved" him from doing so. Greaney pitched some ideas to the writing staff, but none of them were satisfactory, so then-show runner Bill Oakley gave him the idea for this episode. Oakley had Greaney come to Hollywood to write it, and when Greaney showed the first draft to the staff, they liked it, so Oakley hired him.

The writers wanted the title of the episode to make Homer sound proud about his weight, so they decided to name it "King-Size Homer". Greaney really enjoyed working on the episode because Homer is constantly happy and goal-oriented in it, instead of being a slob who is "eating all the time". Animator David Silverman designed the obese Homer for the episode. There was a discussion about what Homer would wear when he became fat, and they decided to go with a muumuu. The writers were also discussing about how they were going to treat Homer's obesity. They did not want Homer to come off as a "hog", so they decided that the viewer should barely see him eating after he reaches his 300 pounds goal. As the writers were trying to figure out a way to get Homer back to his old weight by the end of the episode, it was suggested that Homer should feel bad about his obesity, and therefore become thin for Marge, but that idea was scrapped in early production. Action figurines based on obese Homer were made for the World of Springfield in December 2001.

Homer has a dream in which he is standing at the foot of a mountain with 300 pounds as the goal at the top. A pig wearing a tuxedo appears next to him in the dream, and motivates Homer to reach the top of the mountain. This scene was inspired by the cover of the "Sweetness and Light" issue of National Lampoon magazine. The staff thought that Cary Grant would have been ideal for the pig in Homer's dream sequence, but he died nine years before the episode was made, so they used cast member Hank Azaria for the voice. Joan Kenley guest starred in the episode as the telephone lady. The staff flew her down from Northern California to record her part for the episode.

== Cultural references ==
The plus-sized clothes store is called "The Vast Waistband", a reference to Newton Minow's speech "Television and the Public Interest". In the store, two mannequins wearing similar outfits and riding on bikes are shown. These are based on Billy and Benny McCrary, the world's heaviest twins who weighed over 700 pounds (318 kg) each. They received fame after appearing in The Guinness Book of World Records in a picture that depicts the twins riding their Honda motorcycles. They would appear again in the same season in the episode "The Day the Violence Died". The scene in which Bart and his friends observe the obese Homer through a window is based on a scene from the 1993 film What's Eating Gilbert Grape.

Homer thinks that he can order the soft drink Tab by pressing the tab key on the keyboard, and becomes anxious when he can't find the "any key". The latter joke was inspired by the writers reading that 1/3 of complaint calls to a computer help line from new users were from people who could not find the "Any" key, which has never been part of any computer keyboard at any time. When Homer vents gas from a nuclear reactor, the gas destroys crops of corn. A farmer says, "Oh no, the corn! Paul Newman's gonna have ma' legs broke!". This is in reference to the legend of Newman's Own popcorn products, in which Newman threatened anyone who might attempt to steal his popcorn.

At the cinema, Homer tries to watch the film Honk If You're Horny, starring actor Pauly Shore and actress Faye Dunaway. Dunaway turned down a guest spot on the show and in retaliation, the writers opted to put her in a goofy movie that they thought was below her caliber of work. Homer's "fat guy hat" strongly resembles Chef Paul Prudhomme's and actor Dom DeLuise's signature white caps.

== Reception ==
In its original broadcast, "King-Size Homer" finished 45th (tied with Grace Under Fire) in the ratings for the week of October 30 to November 3, 1995, with a Nielsen rating of 10.0. The episode was the third-highest-rated show on the Fox network that week.

Since airing, the episode has received mostly positive reviews from fans and television critics, making many top episode lists. In 2008, Empire placed The Simpsons at the top of their list of "The 50 Greatest TV Shows of All Time", and noted "King-Size Homer" as the show's best episode, calling it "An unimprovable mix of sharp dialogue, hilarious sight gags and heart." Kimberly Potts of AOL Television named the episode the seventh best episode of the series. Michael Moran of The Times ranked it as the tenth best. "King-Size Homer" appeared on The Star-Ledger's list of the ten best episodes on The Simpsons that represent the comic and emotional scope of the show.

The Herald Sun put the episode at ninth place on their list of the top twenty episodes of The Simpsons, and highlighted the scene in which Homer is seen "commandeering an ice cream truck in a frantic dash to the nuclear plant to avoid an impending meltdown". Emily VanDerWerff of Slant Magazine named the episode the show's fifth best, stating "while there are a lot of funny jokes in this episode (including Homer's fingers that are too fat to dial), the best thing about it is the sight of Homer, weighing well over 300 pounds, dressed in a muumuu and a 'fat guy hat.' The climax is a little forced and cartoon-y...but Homer's weight gain works so well visually that the episode gets away with a lot more than it might."

Dave Foster of DVD Times said: "The glee to which [Homer] takes to the challenge and the enthusiasm which Bart brings to the project show these two really do connect when the situation is oh so wrong, and the method in which the writers tackle the not-always-so-obvious downsides to such a disability are both adult and astutely amusing." Jennifer Malkowski of DVD Verdict considered the best part of the episode to be during Homer's shopping trip to The Vast Waistband. The website concluded its review by giving the episode a grade of A. DVD Movie Guide's Colin Jacobson enjoyed the episode and called it "one of the series' more cynical episodes", and said that it "pours on the laughs". He continued by saying, "It's amusing to see Homer's pursuit of obesity, and it exploits his idiocy well. It lacks the expected mushiness about the plight of fat folks, though it does make a point about sensitivity in an understated way."

The authors of the book I Can't Believe It's a Bigger and Better Updated Unofficial Simpsons Guide, Gary Russell and Gareth Roberts, wrote: "this isn't one of the best episodes. Homer's at his most irritating and childish here—you really want Marge to beat him up." They added that Homer's antics with the computer, such as the scene in which he tries to find the any key, and Mr. Burns running exercise classes are the highlights of the episode. Screen Rant called it the best episode of the seventh season.

When The Simpsons began streaming on Disney+ in 2019, former Simpsons writer and executive producer Bill Oakley named this one of the best classic Simpsons episodes to watch on the service. Later that same year, Consequence ranked it number nine on its list of top 30 Simpsons episodes.

Erik Adams writes that any review of the episode "threatens to devolve into a laundry list of out-of-context quotes. (A few, because I’m not a complete killjoy: 'I wash ma-self with a rag on a stick!' 'I don’t want to look like a weirdo—I’ll just go with the muumuu.' 'To start, press any key.’ Where's the ‘Any’ key?') The episode rushes into a save-the-day finale that's at odds with what comes before it, but Greaney's first effort is still a Simpsons classic."
