= Jori Finkel =

American writer and editor

- Born: October 15, 1970 (age 56)
- Education: Columbia University
- Occupations: writer and editor
- Spouse: Michael Benjamin Lubic (September 14, 2008- Present)

Jori Finkel (born October 15, 1970) is an American writer, editor and educator who specializes in contemporary art. She is best known for chronicling the Los Angeles art scene during its expansion in the first decades of the 21st century.

She is currently a contributor to The New York Times from Los Angeles and the West Coast correspondent for The Art Newspaper.

== Background ==
Finkel graduated summa cum laude with a B.A. in English from Columbia University in New York and earned her M.A. in English and Comparative Literature at Stanford University. She studied the history of the avant-gardes in a doctoral program at Stanford.

She married Michael Benjamin Lubic on Sept. 14, 2008 on a sailboat in the Santa Monica Bay.

She told an interviewer from Zocalo Public Square that her introduction to the art world occurred in college when she worked for the Columbia Bartending Agency in New York—she bartended for Julian Schnabel parties at the Mary Boone gallery.

== Editing ==
From 1998 to 2004 she was senior editor at Art+Auction magazine in New York. She published a memory of Bruce Wolmer, the longtime Art+Auction editor, when he died in 2010.

== Teaching ==
Finkel developed a course for Otis College of Art and Design in 2007 called Popular Art Writing.

== Journalism ==
=== The New York Times ===
From 2005 to 2009 and again since 2013, she has covered visual art and artists from Los Angeles for The New York Times with attention to gender issues. Some of her subjects have included Betye Saar, David Hockney, Nadya Tolokonnikova, John Outterbridge, Narsiso Martinez, Kaari Upson, Rose B. Simpson, Alison Saar, Alison Knowles, Simone Forti, Mounira Al Solh, Doris Salcedo, Ai Weiwei, Judy Chicago, Mary Kelly, Robert Irwin, John Baldessari, Doug Aitken, Andrea Zittel and Lynn Hershman.

She broke news about the hard-sell strategies for unauthenticated Salvador Dalí and Pablo Picasso prints taking place through cruise ship auctions. This article led to additional class-action lawsuits and major lines such as Disney and Royal Caribbean cancelling contracts with the auction house.

She also wrote an early report on the questionable ethics of museums soliciting financial donations from galleries for museum exhibitions featuring gallery artists. This article had little lasting impact: a report nine years later in The New York Times showed the problem to be much more extensive.

=== Los Angeles Times ===
As staff art reporter at the L.A. Times from 2010 through 2013, Finkel wrote a mix of feature articles and news stories. Her investigation into the finances of the nonprofit Watts House Project prompted the resignation of its founding director, Edgar Arceneaux.

=== Controversy ===
Finkel's job as the art reporter of the L.A. Times was eliminated in July 2013 in a round of layoffs, one of several during a period when the newspaper was up for sale.

In response, 15 California museum directors sent a letter to the editor of the L.A. Times calling for her reinstatement and calling her the "go-to source here for art-world news and analysis, with articles that are consistently insightful and accessible and a byline that is read around the world."

The letter's lead authors were Ann Philbin, director of the Hammer Museum; Michael Govan, director of the Los Angeles County Museum of Art; and James Cuno, director of the J. Paul Getty Trust.

Artists John Baldessari, Judy Chicago, Catherine Opie, Marina Abramović, Robert Gober, Doug Wheeler, Doug Aitken and Lynn Hershman were among those who added their names when the letter was posted online as a change.org petition. Baldessari wrote: "It’s a gigantic loss."

The Hollywood Reporter noted, "It’s not often a newspaper writer makes the news rounds."

L.A. Times editor Davan Maharaj responded with a letter, also posted on multiple news sites, identifying other staff reporters who cover arts and entertainment. He stated "our commitment to intelligent and illuminating reporting of the visual arts in Southern California is in no way diminished."

Finkel's job was not reinstated.

== Identity Theft ==
After writing a New York Times article on Lynn Hershman's double life as Roberta Breitmore, Finkel organized an exhibition for the Santa Monica Museum of Art to present this work for the first time in its entirety: "Identity Theft: Lynn Hershman, Eleanor Antin, Suzy Lake: 1972-78."

Hershman developed the Roberta Breitmore persona over several years in the 1970s, going out on the town in a particular outfit and "ultimately securing, among other things, a driver's license, an apartment, a shrink and a succession of dates."

"Identity Theft" put the Roberta project into the larger context of feminist artworks of the 1970s by exhibiting it alongside other examples of women artists fashioning alter egos or making themselves over. These role-playing projects anticipated Cindy Sherman's celebrated Untitled Film Stills of 1978.

Art in America critic Sarah Valdez said "Antin’s, Hershman’s and Lake’s challenging agenda and high-quality work make their status as lesser-known feminist pioneers bewildering."

Curator Ali Subotnick in Artforum put "Identity Theft" on her top ten list for 2007 shows and called the projects "radical works ahead of their time and all relevant today."

The exhibition coincided with a much larger survey of feminist art at the Museum of Contemporary Art Los Angeles, "WACK! Art and the Feminist Revolution."

== Artist and Mother ==
Before popular podcasts on the subject, Finkel wrote and developed a documentary for PBS about artists who make motherhood a part of their work, what she called at the time "the last taboo in contemporary art." Directed by Joanna Sokolowski and Kate Trumbull-LaValle and written and co-produced by Finkel, "Artist and Mother" profiles four talented artist-mothers (Rebecca Campbell, Andrea Chung, Tanya Aguiniga and Kenyatta A.C. Hinkle) and maps out a brief history of motherhood in art from Venus figurines to medieval Mary and Child paintings to conceptual artist Mary Kelly and beyond.

The hour-long film aired on PBS in 2018 and subsequently was screened at the Cantor Arts Center at Stanford, the California African American Museum in Los Angeles and Artspace in Sydney. It was nominated for an Emmy in the category of arts programming and won a L.A. Press Club Award for best LGBTQ/Gender reporting.

== It Speaks to Me ==
In 2019 Finkel published the book It Speaks to Me: Art that Inspires Artists (Prestel/DelMonico Press), featuring 50 leading artists on artworks that move them. Highlights include: Shirin Neshat on Alice Neel, David Hockney on Edgar Degas, Marina Abramović on Umberto Boccioni, Ai Weiwei on a Shang Dynasty jade, Nick Cave on Jasper Johns, Judy Chicago on Agnes Pelton, Do Ho Suh on Jeong Seon, Mark Bradford on Mark Rothko, and Gillian Wearing on Rembrandt.

New York Magazine published an excerpt, calling it "an argument for why art museums matter." Publishers Weekly called it an "entertaining tour of works that have inspired artists, adding "This thoughtful work makes artistry accessible and also serves as an educational tool for those interested in exploring art and those who create it." The L.A. Weekly called it "must-read material for anyone interested in how art history shapes itself across time, place, and the lives of individuals."

== Public appearances ==
Finkel is a regular lecturer at museums and art fairs, speaking about the fast-changing state of cultural journalism and criticism as well as topics within contemporary performance, feminist art, Dada, and the history of the art market.
