= Dan Greaney =

American television writer (born 1964)

- Greaney in 2026

Personal details
- Born: Daniel John Greaney; September 28, 1964 (age 62) Duxbury, Massachusetts, U.S.
- Party: Republican
- Other political affiliations: Democratic (formerly)
- Spouse: Shinako Greaney
- Education: Harvard University (BA, JD)
- Occupation: Television writer
- Known for: The Simpsons
- Website: Campaign website

Daniel John Greaney (born September 28, 1964) is an American television writer and political candidate. He has written for The Simpsons and The Office. He was hired during The Simpsons' seventh season after writing the first draft of the episode "King-Size Homer", and left after season eleven. He returned to the Simpsons staff during the thirteenth season, and remains involved with the series (as a consulting producer and occasional writer) into the present day.

On May 26, 2026, Greaney announced that he would run for president of the United States in 2028 as a Republican to succeed term-limited Republican incumbent president Donald Trump, making him one of the first declared candidates for president in 2028.

== Life and career ==
Greaney attended Harvard College, where he was president of Harvard Lampoon and editor of the Harvard Lampoon's nationally distributed parody of USA Today. He also worked as an editorial assistant at The Boston Globe. He graduated from Harvard in 1987.

After college, he worked as a reporter for USA Today and co-authored a book entitled Truly One Nation with USA Today founder Allen H. Neuharth. He subsequently attended Harvard Law School. While at Harvard Law, he was an editor of the Harvard Law Record. Upon graduation, he practiced law in New York for two years, during which time he co-founded PME, a television and media company operating in Ukraine and several other former Soviet republics.

Greaney coined the word embiggen for the 1996 "Lisa the Iconoclast" episode from season seven of The Simpsons.

Greaney has worked on numerous film projects, most notably as composer on Borat: Cultural Learnings of America for Make Benefit Glorious Nation of Kazakhstan.

Greaney is credited with writing "Bart to the Future", an episode of The Simpsons from 2000 based on Donald Trump's run for president under the Reform party that presented the possibility of a Donald Trump presidency, which would be realized sixteen years later.

Greaney was a registered independent during most of his life, he became a registered Democrat during the Iraq war of 2003

=== 2028 presidential campaign ===
Dan Greaney for President 2028
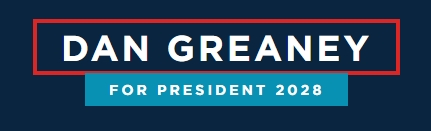
- Campaign: 2028 presidential election (Republican Party primaries)
- Candidate: Dan Greaney; Television writer
- Affiliation: Republican Party
- Status: Active
- Announced: May 26, 2026
- Key people: Mieke Marple (campaign director)
- Slogan: For All

Website
- dangreaneyusa.com

On May 26, 2026, Greaney announced his intention to run for president of the United States in the 2028 election in a video posted to his Instagram account. In a press release, his campaign stated he would run as a "progressive Republican in the tradition of Abraham Lincoln and Teddy Roosevelt", naming universal health care and the Green New Deal as policy planks. Greaney has also called for the expansion of the Supreme Court to 13 justices. Greaney filed to run for president in the Republican primary with the Federal Election Commission on April 19, 2026.

Greaney held his first campaign event on June 5, 2026, in Los Angeles. On June 23, Greaney joined “The Hill on NewsNation” to discuss his candidacy for president with news correspondent Laura Ingle. Greaney has stated on running that "I see a future where Trumpism has been defeated, polarization is moderated, and we create an America that works for all."

== Writing credits ==
=== The Simpsons episodes ===
Greaney has written the following episodes:

- "King-Size Homer" (1995)
- "Summer of 4 Ft. 2" (1996)
- "Treehouse of Horror VII" (The Genesis Tub) (1996)
- "My Sister, My Sitter" (1997)
- "The Simpsons Spin-Off Showcase" (The Love-Matic Grampa) (1997)
- "Realty Bites" (1997)
- "This Little Wiggy" (1998)
- "I'm with Cupid" (1999)
- "Thirty Minutes over Tokyo" (1999)
- "Bart to the Future" (2000)
- "'Scuse Me While I Miss the Sky" (co-writer) (2003)
- "I, (Annoyed Grunt)-bot" (co-writer) (2004)
- "Bonfire of the Manatees" (2005)
- "Judge Me Tender" (co-writer) (2010)
- "Diggs" (co-writer) (2014)
- "Barthood" (2015)
- "The Great Phatsby" (Part 2 with Matt Selman) (2017)
- "Now Museum, Now You Don't" (2020)
- "Lisa the Boy Scout" (2022)
- "Treehouse of Horror XXXVI" (Plastic World) (2025)

=== The Office episodes ===
Greaney wrote the following episodes:

- "Mrs. California" (8.09) (2011)
- "Suit Warehouse" (9.11) (2013)

=== Television pilots and series ===
Greaney worked on the following pilots and short-lived TV series in his two-year break from The Simpsons:

- The Michael Richards Show - Producer
- Animals Anonymous - Creator, writer
- Long Distance - Creator, writer
