= Casey Jane Ellison =

American stand-up comedian, writer and artist

Casey Jane Ellison (born March 29, 1988) is an American stand-up comedian, writer and multimedia artist.

== Life ==
Ellison was born and raised in Los Angeles, California, "across the street from the La Brea Tar Pits." Her mother is a civil rights attorney and her father works in the financial services industry. She has a degree in film, video and animation from the School of the Art Institute of Chicago.

== Work ==
Ellison starred in comedic web series such as Ovation's Touching the Art (an all-female panel talk show focused on contemporary art) and VFILES' What the F*shion and Status Update.

She was selected by the New Museum in New York City to be a 2015 Triennial artist. In addition to producing new episodes of Touching the Art on location at the New Museum and screening them for the duration of the Triennial, she also created a separate work entitled "It's So Important to Seem Wonderful, Part II," which was a continuation of a work she first screened at the Museum of Contemporary Art, Los Angeles, in 2012.

Her work (in both the comedy and fine art spheres) often consists of self-parody and self-objectification, and she has exhibited animated 3-D renderings of herself performing stand-up in art contexts.

As a writer, she has contributed to publications and outlets such as Vice Magazine, Gawker, Dazed and GQ.

In 2008, Ellison founded Aboveground Animation, a traveling animation showcase which also includes a web-based experience for viewing the chosen works.

In 2015, she was selected by Paper Magazine for their annual "Beautiful People" list.

In 2019, Ellison, along with Search Party co-creator Charles Rogers (director), co-hosted the Earwolf-produced limited series podcast, The Problem with Charles and Casey, which premiered on March 31. The podcast featured in-depth interviews with guests, Louie Anderson, Jessica Williams, Starlee Kine, Tierney Finster, Jordan Firstman, Michelle Badillo, and Chelsea Peretti, about a problem they are facing in their lives.
