= Serpentine x FLAG Art Foundation Prize =

Biennial art award

The Serpentine x FLAG Art Foundation Prize is an art award established in 2025. It is to be presented biennially to an artist who has been exhibiting professionally for fewer than ten years.

The prize is a collaboration between New York's FLAG Art Foundation, and Serpentine Galleries in London. It will be awarded to five artists over a ten-year period. At £200,000 per award, the Financial Times notes it is the UK's largest prize for a living artist.
