= Poly(ethyl methacrylate) =

Names
- Other names Ethyl 2-methyl-2-propenoate homopolymer Ethylmethacrylate, homopolymer 2-Propenoic acid, ethyl ester, homopolymer

Identifiers
CAS Number	9003-42-3
Abbreviations	PEMA
ChEBI	CHEBI:53221
ChemSpider	none
ECHA InfoCard	100.131.117
CompTox Dashboard (EPA)	DTXSID701009717

Properties
Chemical formula	(C_{6}H_{10}O_{2})_{n}
Appearance	powder
Solubility in water	insoluble in water
- Except where otherwise noted, data are given for materials in their standard state (at 25 °C [77 °F], 100 kPa). Infobox references

Poly(ethyl methacrylate) (PEMA) is a hydrophobic synthetic acrylate polymer. It has properties similar to the more common PMMA, however it produces less heat during polymerization, has a lower modulus of elasticity and has an overall softer texture. It may be vulcanized using lead oxide as a catalyst and it can be softened using ethanol.

It is used as an impression material of ear canals for the fabrication of hearing aids. It is also used in dentistry as a chair-side denture reline material for partial and complete dentures as well as a tissue conditioner with implant-supported dentures. It is used as a component of fossil coating and preservation and for fabricating artificial nails
