= Narsiso Martinez =

Narsiso Martinez (born 1977) is a Oaxacan mixed media artist that specializes in portraits. At the age of 20 he immigrated to the United States. While living in the U.S., Martinez found work picking produce during the summer using his experience to create his artworks. He gathers inspiration from other farmworkers around him.

== Life and education ==
Narsiso Martinez was born in Santa Cruz Papalutla, Oaxaca. After living there for 20 years he left the country crossing the border to Los Angeles. When he arrived he focused on his education putting his efforts into gaining his GED which he achieved after 10 years at Evans Community Adult School. At 29 years old he enrolled into Los Angeles Community College. He studied art at the college obtaining his Associates of Art in 2009. He chose to study art as he states to BOMB Magazine, "I always liked to draw, even as a kid. I would ask my friends and neighbors to sit for me, and I would do quick sketches. As I got older, I drew portraits of people I saw in magazines, then challenged myself by drawing the full figure and doing collages." After obtaining his associates, he enrolled to Cal State Long Beach earning his Bachelors degree in Fine Art in 2012, and continuing his education at Cal State Long Beach, in 2018 achieving his masters in Fine Arts. It was during this time he would spend his summers working in produce fields at Washington state to help pay for his education.

== Art ==
During his time at Cal State Long Beach while taking Art History classes he learned about painters such as Vincent van Gogh, and Jean-François Millet. This led him into picking up drawing again, and while working at the fields during the summer would sketch rural landscapes on a small notebook during his breaks. He then moved onto making portraits after finding produce boxes on the ground while eating a pizza at Costco, he asked to take them with him.

He began to draw on a portrait of a farmworker on a produce box of bananas. From there he began his process of creating more work using this technique of gathering produce boxes, and visiting farmworkers from either the same fields he worked in or new ones to take photographs. From there he would edit, and combine the photos to create a reference for his work.
