= Columbia Bartending Agency =

Student-run business at Columbia University

The Columbia Bartending Agency and School of Mixology is a student-run business at Columbia University that trains, certifies, and represents bartenders in New York City. All instructors at the School of Mixology are Columbia students and themselves alumni of the program, and all classes are open to the public. Students who complete the mixology program and perform well enough on the final examination, which consists of both a performance test and written portion, have the option of joining the Columbia Bartending Agency, which hires out its bartenders' services around New York. The business is financially self-sufficient and independent from the university.

The bartending agency began operating in 1965 as one of sixteen agencies within Columbia Student Agencies, which was founded in 1964 as part of an initiative to encourage student employment. The course that would eventually become the School of Mixology was cosponsored by the agency and the university, and for the first several years it was taught by Joseph Reilly, the bar manager of the Barclay Hotel. During its first two years of existence, clients of the Columbia Bartending Agency included Jane Fonda, authors Leo Rosten and Arnold Schulman, and informal gatherings at the United Nations.
