= Timeline of the 2028 United States presidential election =

- November 7, 2028

This is a timeline of major events leading up to, during, and after the 2028 United States presidential election, which will be held on November 7, 2028. In addition to the dates mandated by the relevant federal laws, such as those in the U.S. Constitution and the Electoral Count Act, several milestones have consistently been observed since the adoption of the conclusions of the 1971 McGovern–Fraser Commission.

== 2024 ==
- November 6: Donald Trump is declared the winner of the 2024 presidential election by a consensus of major news outlets projecting the results, defeating incumbent Vice President Kamala Harris.
- November 8: Scott Brennan, the only Iowan on the Democratic National Committee Rules and Bylaws Committee at the time, which determines the order of states in the presidential nominating process, says he still plans to fight for the return of the first-in-the-nation presidential caucuses spot back to Iowa for 2028.
- December 10: Democratic National Committee chair candidate James Skoufis calls on the Democratic National Committee to maintain its current presidential nominating calendar that puts South Carolina first in the 2028 Democratic Party presidential primaries. Skoufis writes in a memo, "South Carolina has been placed at the forefront of the presidential nominating process. I believe they deserve a genuine opportunity for a competitive primary. The contest between Dean Phillips and Joe Biden was not a serious primary. So let’s have one."
- December 22: New Hampshire Democratic Party Chairman Ray Buckley states his intention to try to work to return the first-in-the-nation Democratic Party presidential primary status back to New Hampshire in the 2028 presidential nominating calendar. In an interview with WMUR-TV, Buckley states, "We believe we have a very strong case to make. It's two years away. We think it's important that people [don't] think someone put a thumb on it, and we are awarded our position because we earned it."

== 2025 ==
- January 6: The electoral votes from the 2024 presidential election are formally counted before a joint session of Congress; as president of the Senate, Kamala Harris formally announces the electoral result, becoming the first incumbent vice president since Al Gore in 2001 to preside over the vote counting of a presidential election in which they were the losing candidate.
- January 20: Donald Trump and JD Vance are inaugurated as the 47th president and 50th vice president of the United States.
- February 1: Ken Martin is elected chairman of the Democratic National Committee by party voting members at the DNC's Winter Meeting.
- February 22: Vice President Vance wins the 2025 CPAC presidential straw poll with 61%, with Steve Bannon in second at 12%.
- March 19: The New York Times reports that Trump and the Republican Party had threatened, signed executive actions, and ordered investigations into their political opponents, critics, and organizations aligned with the Democratic Party and progressive politics in an attempt to hobble Democrats' ability to compete in future elections.
- March 30: NBC reports that Trump would not rule out seeking a third term as president, with Trump saying he "was not joking" about a third term, and telling NBC "there are methods" for doing so, including running for vice president with JD Vance running for president and, upon winning, passing the role to Trump.
- April 24: The Trump Organization begins selling hats and T-shirts with "Trump 2028" written on them, provoking questions about whether or not Trump would attempt to run for a third term.
- May 4: Trump says in an interview with NBC News that he will only serve two terms as president and will not run again after winning twice, mentioning both Vance and Secretary of State Marco Rubio as his potential successors.
- June 5: Iowa's only seat on the Democratic National Committee's Rules and Bylaws Committee, which determines the order of states in the presidential nominating process, is removed, and New Hampshire was awarded a second seat on the committee.
- August 7: Ken Martin, the chair of the Democratic National Committee, says in a NewsNation interview that the Rules and Bylaws Committee will discuss the 2028 primary calendar in a Minneapolis meeting later in the month.
- September 30: In an Oval Office meeting with congressional leaders prior to the 2025 government shutdown, Trump displays red hats with "Trump 2028" emblazoned on the front.
- November 4: The 2025 United States off year elections are held, resulting in major victories for Democrats.
- November 23: Axios reports that the Democratic National Committee is considering implementing ranked voting for their 2028 presidential primaries.

== 2026 ==
- January 16: The deadline passes for states to submit applications to be part of the early window of the 2028 Democratic presidential primaries under the new DNC framework. Applications were submitted by Delaware, Georgia, Iowa, Illinois, Michigan, Nevada, New Hampshire, New Mexico, North Carolina, South Carolina, Tennessee, and Virginia.
- January 31: The Democratic National Committee's Rules and Bylaws Committee votes to advance all 12 applicant states to the next phase of consideration for the early window of the presidential primary calendar.
- March 28: Vice President Vance wins the 2026 CPAC presidential straw poll with 53%, with Marco Rubio in second at 35%.
- May 26: Television writer Dan Greaney announces his candidacy for the Republican nomination, marking the first candidate to be mentioned as declared in the press. His key policies include universal health care and the Green New Deal.
- May 28: 2020 Libertarian Party nominee Jo Jorgensen announces the formation of an exploratory committee for a possible run for the 2028 Libertarian nomination.
- June 8: Gregory Bovino, the former commander-at-large of the United States Border Patrol, forms an exploratory committee for a possible run for the Republican nomination.
- June 14: Former Secretary of Transportation Pete Buttigieg wins the 2026 Wisconsin Democratic Party Convention straw poll with 17.7%. Alexandria Ocasio-Cortez finishes in second place at 17.5%, one vote behind Buttigieg.
- June 18: Rhode Island governor Dan McKee signs HB 7090, moving the state's 2028 presidential primary from the fourth Tuesday in April to the first Tuesday in March.
- July 24: The DNC Rules and Bylaws Committee votes to recommend that South Carolina remain the first state on the 2028 Democratic presidential primary calendar.
- August 12: Former NBA player and perennial candidate Royce White announces his candidacy for the Republican nomination.
- August 15: The DNC votes to officially approve South Carolina as the first U.S. state of the 2028 presidential primaries cycle for the Democratic Party.
- September 9–10: The 2026 Republican National Convention is held in Dallas, Texas.
- September 10: The Republican National Committee approves the 2028 Republican presidential nominating calendar, keeping Iowa as the first contest, followed by New Hampshire, Nevada and South Carolina.
- November 3: Midterm elections: The Democratic Party flips both the Senate and the House, securing their largest congressional majority since the 2008 elections. States won by Trump by wide margins in 2024, including Alaska, Iowa, Kansas, Mississippi, Ohio, South Carolina, and Texas, are flipped by Democrats.
- November 6: The Washington Post reports that Florida Governor Ron DeSantis is planning a 2028 presidential campaign.
- November 9: Trump says in an interview that he may not endorse a Republican candidate for president in 2028.
- November 12: California Governor Gavin Newsom says that he will decide whether to run for president by early January.

== 2027 ==
According to The Washington Post, presidential candidates have tended to declare their candidacies about a year and a half before Election Day, with the median date falling in mid-March of the previous year. However, some candidates have declared their candidacies much earlier, such as Donald Trump (in 2024) 721 days before Election Day, Andrew Yang (in 2020) 997 days before, and John Delaney (in 2020) 1,194 days before.

- November 2: The 2027 United States off year elections will be held.

== 2028 ==
- January 22: South Carolina Democratic primary
- February 1: Nevada Democratic primary
- February 8: New Hampshire Democratic primary
- February 15: New Mexico Democratic primary
- February 22: Michigan Democratic primary
- February 29: Virginia Democratic primary
- March 7: Super Tuesday
- August 7–10: The 2028 Democratic National Convention will be held.
- Late September: Early voting will begin in some states.
- November 7: The 2028 United States presidential election will be held.
- December 18: Electors to the Electoral College will meet at their respective state capitals on the first Monday after the second Wednesday of December and formally cast their votes for President and Vice President.

== 2029 ==
- January 6: At around 1:00 p.m. Eastern Standard Time, the United States Congress will meet in a joint session to tabulate the Electoral College votes; the president of the Senate will formally announce the electoral result.
- January 20: At noon Eastern Standard Time, the president-elect and vice president-elect will be inaugurated.

== See also ==
- Timeline of the Donald Trump presidencies
