= 2028 Libertarian Party presidential primaries =

The 2028 Libertarian Party presidential primaries and caucuses are a series of electoral contests to indicate non-binding preferences for the Libertarian Party (LP) presidential nominee in the 2028 United States presidential election. These differ from the Republican or Democratic presidential primaries and caucuses in that they do not appoint delegates to represent a candidate at the party's convention to select the party's presidential nominee.

== Candidates ==
=== Formed exploratory committee ===
| Candidate | Born | Experience | State | Exploratory committee announced | Website | Ref |
|---|---|---|---|---|---|---|
| Jo Jorgensen | May 1, 1957 (age 69); Libertyville, Illinois | 2020 Libertarian presidential nominee Nominee for Vice President in 1996; Nominee for U.S. representative from SC-04 in 1992 | South Carolina | May 28, 2026 | VoteJo28.com | |

==== Jo Jorgensen ====
Jo Jorgensen is an academic and political activist who was the Libertarian Party's presidential nominee in the 2020 election. In May 2026, Jorgensen announced the formation of an exploratory committee to weigh a potential run for the 2028 Libertarian presidential nomination.

=== Speculated by the media ===
| Candidate | Born | Experience | State | Ref |
|---|---|---|---|---|
| Thomas Massie | January 13, 1971 (age 55); Huntington, West Virginia | United States representative for Kentucky's 4th congressional district (2012–present); Judge-Executive of Lewis County (2011–2012) | Kentucky | |

==== Thomas Massie ====
Thomas Massie has served as the United States representative for Kentucky's 4th congressional district since 2012. During President Donald Trump's second administration, Massie drew national attention for his disputes with Republican leadership over the One Big Beautiful Bill Act and the Epstein Files Transparency Act. He ran for re-election in 2026 in what was the most expensive U.S. House primary in history, losing renomination to Ed Gallrein, the Trump-endorsed candidate. He has been identified as a potential 2028 presidential candidate by NBC in May 2026 and by The Guardian that same month. In November 2026, Axios reported that a coalition of Libertarians and disaffected Republicans are plotting a campaign to draft Massie for the Libertarian nomination.

== See also ==
- 2028 Democratic Party presidential primaries
- 2028 Republican Party presidential primaries
