= 2028 Republican Party presidential primaries =

Selection of the Republican Party nominee

- TBD

TBD delegates to the Republican National Convention
- First place by pledged delegate allocation
Previous Republican nominee
Donald Trump

Presidential primaries and caucuses are going to be organized by the Republican Party to select delegates to the 2028 Republican National Convention to determine the party's nominee for president in the 2028 election. The primaries and caucuses will take place in all 50 U.S. states, Washington, D.C., and five U.S. territories. No primary dates have been determined.

Incumbent president Donald Trump is constitutionally ineligible to be elected to a third term as president under the Twenty-second Amendment. It is disputed whether he is also ineligible to serve as vice president under the Twelfth Amendment.

== Candidates ==
=== Declared ===
Candidate	Born	Most recent position	Home state	Campaign announced	Campaign	Ref
Dan Greaney	September 28, 1964 (age 62); Duxbury, Massachusetts	Television writer	California	May 26, 2026	FEC filing Website	
Royce White	April 10, 1991 (age 35); Minneapolis, Minnesota	Republican nominee for U.S. Senate from Minnesota in 2024	Minnesota	August 12, 2026	FEC filing	

==== Dan Greaney ====
Dan Greaney is a television writer, lawyer, and Harvard University graduate. Greaney is credited with writing the episode of The Simpsons "Bart to the Future" in 2000. The episode presented the possibility of a Donald Trump presidency. On May 26, 2026, Greaney announced his intention to run for president in 2028 on his Instagram account. In a press release, his campaign stated he would run as a "progressive Republican in the tradition of Abraham Lincoln and Teddy Roosevelt," naming universal health care and the Green New Deal as policy planks. He held his official campaign announcement on June 5, 2026.

==== Royce White ====
Royce White is a former professional basketball player. He is mainly known for his NBA career, playing three games with the Sacramento Kings in 2014. White was a candidate for Minnesota's 5th congressional district in 2022, but lost the Republican primary. He ran for U.S. Senate in 2024, but was defeated in the general by Amy Klobuchar. White ran for Senate once more in 2026, coming in third in the Republican primary. On August 12, the day following his loss in the primary, White announced he would seek the Republican presidential nomination. He filed paperwork to run on September 21.

=== Formed exploratory committee ===
Candidate	Born	Experience	State	Exploratory committee announced	Ref
Gregory Bovino	March 27, 1970 (age 56); San Bernardino County, California	Commander-at-large of U.S. Border Patrol (2025–2026)	California	June 8, 2026	

==== Gregory Bovino ====
Gregory Bovino served as the commander-at-large of the United States Border Patrol from October 2025 until his removal in January 2026. In June 2026, NewsNation and The Daily Beast had reported that Bovino had taken steps towards running in the 2028 election, including forming an exploratory committee. He told NewsNation that his campaign was currently exploratory, but would launch a formal campaign "if it all comes together." Following the report, Bovino posted to X that "[if] running for President is what it takes to actually get [mass deportation] done, then all options are on the table". A campaign website created by supporters of Bovino lists policy planks such as reinstating the Department of Government Efficiency and creating a "department of masculinity."

=== Expressed interest ===
Individuals who have expressed an interest in running for the Republican presidential nomination (Note: Individuals listed below have, as of October 2026, personally expressed an interest in seeking the 2028 Republican Party presidential nomination in at least two reliable media sources in the last six months.)
Representative
Don Bacon
from Nebraska
(2017–present)

Former Governor
Chris Christie
of New Jersey
(2010–2018)

Senator
Ted Cruz
from Texas
(2013–present)

Governor
Ron DeSantis
of Florida
(2019–present)

Senator
Josh Hawley
from Missouri
(2019–present)

Senator
John Kennedy
from Louisiana
(2017–present)

Senator
Rand Paul
from Kentucky
(2011–present)

Former Vice President
Mike Pence
from Indiana
(2017–2021)

Vice President
JD Vance
from Ohio
(2025–present)

==== Don Bacon ====
Don Bacon has served as the U.S. representative for Nebraska's 2nd congressional district since 2017. In June 2025, Bacon announced that he wouldn't seek re-election to his seat in 2026. He mentioned in a podcast interview which was reported on in September 2026 by The Hill and The Washington Examiner that he was interested in a presidential run in 2028.

==== Chris Christie ====
Chris Christie served as governor of New Jersey from 2010 to 2018, and ran two unsuccessful bids for president in 2016 and 2024. Christie stated in September 2026 at the Granite State Summit in New Hampshire that he was considering a run for president.

==== Ted Cruz ====
Ted Cruz has served as the junior United States senator from Texas since 2013 after being appointed as the 3rd Solicitor General of Texas by then Texas Attorney General Greg Abbott, he served this role from 2003 to 2008. Initially reluctant to support Trump, Cruz has become a key Republican figure and a close ally of Trump. Cruz was born in Canada after his father, preacher Rafael Cruz, immigrated there from Cuba, though he is still able to fulfill the natural-born citizen requirement due to his mother's American citizenship which he inherited. He now serves as the chair of the Senate Commerce Committee after serving as the ranking member from 2023 to 2025. The runner-up to Donald Trump in the 2016 Republican Party presidential primaries, Cruz has said that he expects to seek the presidency again at some point. While speaking on Texas Lt. Governor Dan Patrick's podcast in August 2026, Cruz stated that "it's no secret that I want to be president."

==== Ron DeSantis ====
Ron DeSantis has served as the 46th governor of Florida since 2019 and previously ran for the Republican presidential nomination in 2024. He is ineligible to seek another consecutive term as governor under the state's constitution and is scheduled to leave office in January 2027. Following Republican losses in the November 2026 midterm elections, DeSantis described the party's national electoral performance as being close to an "extinction-level event" while highlighting Florida's continued Republican control. He also discussed the state's political performance amid speculation about his future role in national politics. On November 6, 2026, The Washington Post reported that DeSantis is planning a 2028 presidential campaign. DeSantis responded that these reports were fabricated. However, he has not explicitly ruled out running in the 2028 election, and when asked recently he stated that he will “cross that bridge when we get to it” due to him still remaining governor until early January 2027 when his term expires.

==== Josh Hawley ====
Josh Hawley has served as the senior U.S. senator from Missouri since 2019. Hawley was elected in 2018, defeating incumbent Democratic senator Claire McCaskill. In September 2026, Hawley explicitly ruled out a presidential campaign in 2028, telling the Washington Examiner in an interview, "No, I have no intention of doing so, period." However, Hawley subsequently reappeared in discussions of potential Republican presidential contenders. Politico mentioned him in its November 10, 2026, coverage of potential Republican political developments ahead of the 2028 election. Fox News also included Hawley among the figures discussed by Republican voters as potential leaders of the party in 2028. On November 20, following Republican losses in the 2026 midterm elections, Fox News reported that Hawley had opened the door to a possible presidential campaign, marking a shift from his earlier position. Asked by the Associated Press about his presidential aspirations, Hawley said, "I think everybody that cares about the future of the party, the future of the country, has a lot of thinking to do. So I'll just say I have a lot of thinking to do." He also told NBC News that he was giving serious thought to his potential role in the party's future, while cautioning that he had not made any plans or decisions regarding a presidential campaign.

==== John Kennedy ====
John Kennedy has served as the junior U.S. senator from Louisiana since 2017. He said in a New Hampshire interview at Politics and Eggs that he planned to run for re-election but he would "never say never" to a possible presidential run. He said in a June 2026 interview at New Hampshire Institute of Politics at Saint Anselm College that he had been contacted by donors about a run for president and that he was open to the idea.

==== Rand Paul ====
Rand Paul has served as the junior U.S. senator from Kentucky since 2011. He previously ran for president in 2016, dropping out after finishing fifth in the 2016 Iowa Republican presidential caucuses. Paul stated in a June interview with Semafor that he would "look at" a presidential run after the midterms conclude. In September 2026, Paul said on Newsmax that he plans to “look thoroughly at it as we see the results come in” and told The Washington Post he’s "50-50 on making the race."

==== Mike Pence ====
Mike Pence served as the 48th vice president of the United States from 2017 to 2021 under President Donald Trump and previously served as the 50th governor of Indiana from 2013 to 2017. He ran for the Republican presidential nomination in 2024, but suspended his campaign in October 2023. In September 2026, Pence said that he had "no plans" to seek the presidency again in 2028, citing his work with his conservative advocacy organization, Advancing American Freedom. However, following Republican losses in the November 2026 midterm elections, Pence appeared to reconsider the possibility of another presidential campaign. On November 12, 2026, he said that he had heard from numerous people encouraging him to consider running in 2028, reopening the possibility of a presidential bid despite his earlier reluctance.

==== JD Vance ====
JD Vance has served as the 50th vice president of the United States since 2025. He previously served as a U.S. senator from Ohio from 2023 to 2025. In October 2026, during a town hall in Michigan, Vance said that there was a chance he won't run in 2028. That same month, Vance said that he believed that Trump would endorse him if he were to declare his presidential candidacy. In November 2026, it was once again reported that Vance was reconsidering a run for president in 2028.

=== Speculated by the media ===
Potential Republican candidates (Note: Individuals listed below have, as of October 2026, been mentioned as potential 2028 presidential candidates in at least two reliable media sources in the last six months.)
Senator
Tom Cotton
from Arkansas
(2015–present)

Governor
Brian Kemp
of Georgia
(2019–present)

Representative
Thomas Massie
from Kentucky
(2012–present)

Former Personnel Director
John McEntee
from Connecticut
(2020–2021)

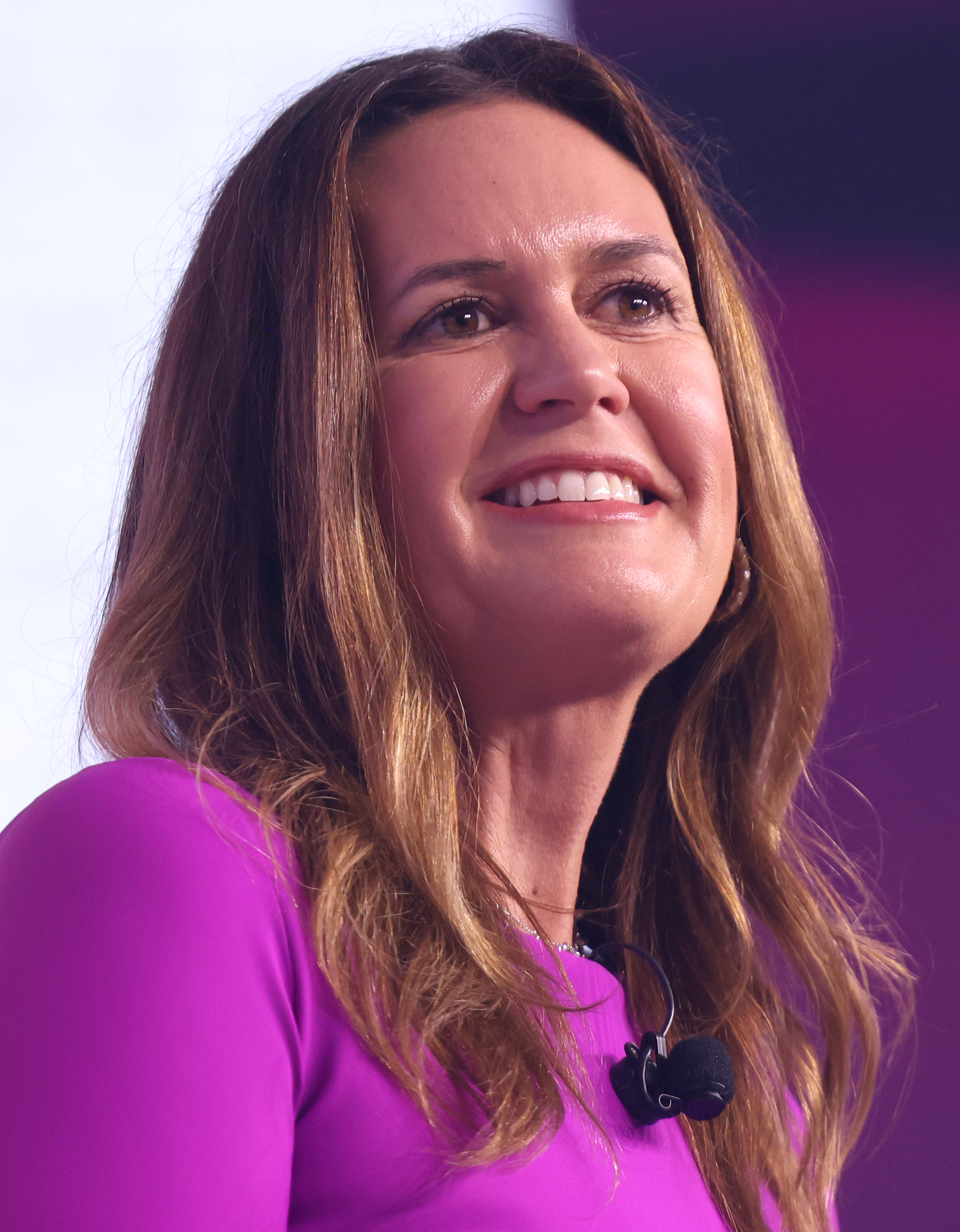
Governor
Sarah Huckabee Sanders
of Arkansas
(2023–present)

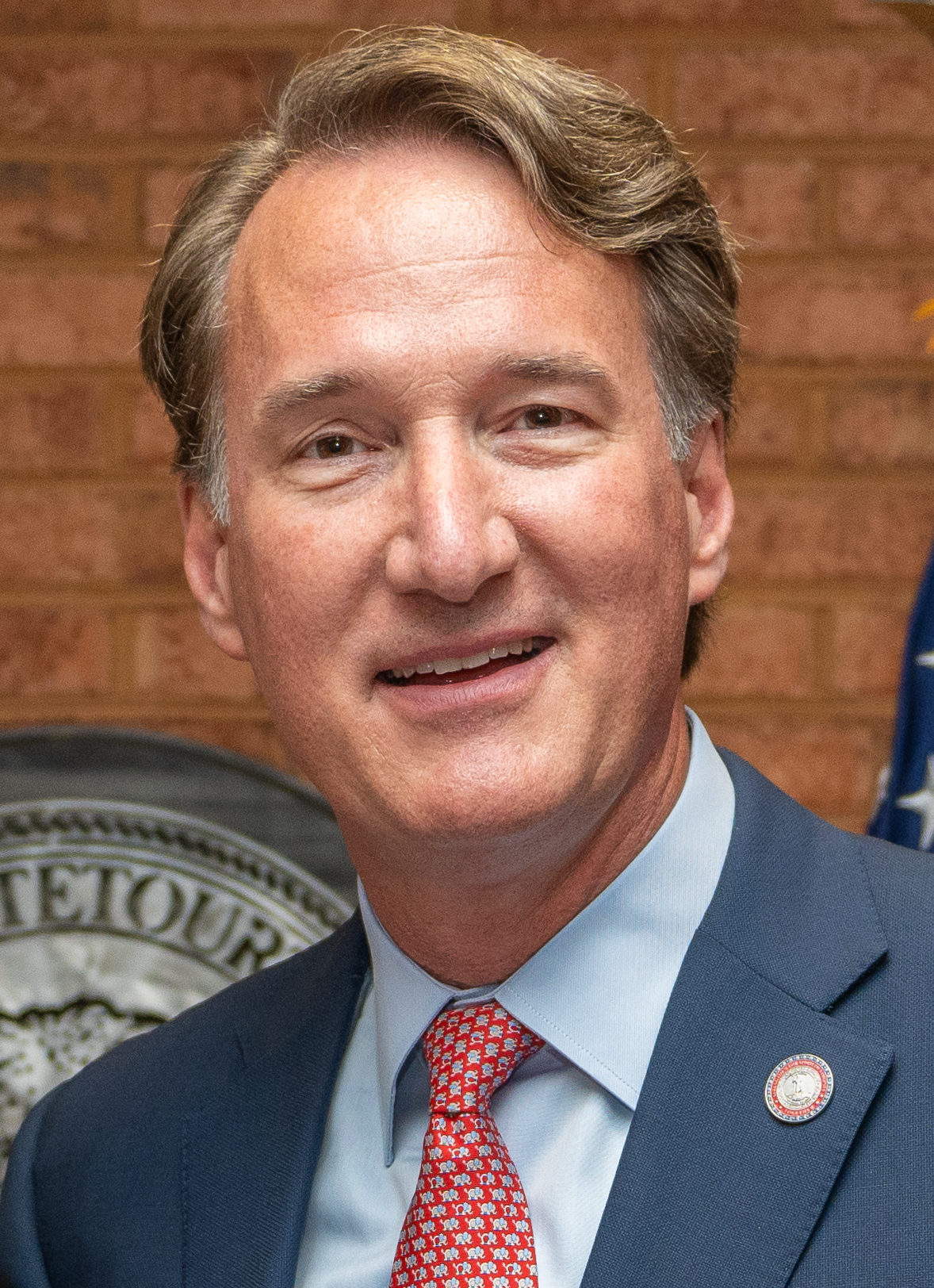
Former Governor
Glenn Youngkin
of Virginia
(2022–2026)

==== Tom Cotton ====
Tom Cotton has served as the junior United States senator from Arkansas since 2015 and is currently the chairman of the United States Senate Select Committee on Intelligence. A former member of the United States House of Representatives and a veteran of the United States Army, Cotton has emerged as a potential Republican presidential contender in 2028. He won re-election to the Senate in November 2026, defeating Democrat Hallie Shoffner. He has been mentioned as a potential 2028 presidential candidate by the BBC in November 2026, NewsNation in its November coverage of potential 2028 presidential candidates, and the Associated Press in November 2026.

==== Brian Kemp ====
Brian Kemp has served as the 83rd governor of Georgia since 2019. Kemp, who is retiring in 2027 due to term limits, is widely seen as a leading alternative to Trump within the Republican Party. In May 2025, he announced that he would not run in the 2026 United States Senate election in Georgia, a decision that fueled speculation about a possible presidential campaign in 2028. He has been identified as a potential 2028 presidential candidate by CNN in May 2026 and by The Washington Post the following month. Following the 2026 midterms, The Washington Post reported that Kemp was laying the groundwork for a presidential campaign.

==== Thomas Massie ====
Thomas Massie has served as the United States representative for Kentucky's 4th congressional district since 2012. During President Donald Trump's second administration, Massie drew national attention for his disputes with Republican leadership over the One Big Beautiful Bill Act and the Epstein Files Transparency Act. He ran for re-election in 2026 in what was the most expensive U.S. House primary in history, losing renomination to Ed Gallrein, the Trump-endorsed candidate. He has been identified as a potential 2028 presidential candidate by NBC in May 2026 and by The Guardian that same month.

==== John McEntee ====
John McEntee is a former aide to U.S. president Donald Trump who served in multiple roles during Trump's first administration, including as director of the White House Presidential Personnel Office. A former quarterback for the University of Connecticut football team, McEntee has emerged as a potential Republican presidential contender in 2028. He was identified as a potential Republican challenger to Vice President JD Vance in November 2026 by Exec Edge. On November 13, 2026, the Connecticut Post reported on McEntee's emergence as a potential contender for the Republican presidential nomination, highlighting his background at UConn and his subsequent political career in the Trump administration. On November 12, 2026, McEntee finished first in a presidential straw poll conducted by the University of Tennessee College Republicans, receiving 31.3% of the vote, ahead of Marco Rubio (29.7%), Ron DeSantis (23.4%), and Vance (15.6%). He finished first on a similar poll done among students at Pennsylvania State University, who gave him 42%, Marco Rubio (23%), Ron Desantis (15%), Thomas Massie (11%), JD Vance (8%).

==== Sarah Huckabee Sanders ====
Sarah Huckabee Sanders has served as the 47th governor of Arkansas since 2023 and previously served as the 31st White House Press Secretary in the first Trump administration. She is the daughter of current United States Ambassador to Israel and former Governor of Arkansas Mike Huckabee, who ran in the 2008 and 2016 Republican Party presidential primaries. She was mentioned by The Hill and The Arkansas Times as a presidential candidate in September 2026.

==== Glenn Youngkin ====
Glenn Youngkin served as the 74th governor of Virginia from 2022 to 2026. Youngkin was elected in 2021 by 2 points in a state where Republicans had not won a statewide election since 2009. Youngkin founded a new educational policy group, Empowering America's Parents, which will be launching ads in several battleground states, fueling speculation of a presidential campaign in 2028. He has been suggested as a potential contender by NBC News in August 2026 and CBS News that same month.

=== Declined to run ===
The following individuals have, as of November 2026, publicly denied interest in being a candidate:

- Steve Bannon, senior counselor to the President (2017)
- Scott Bessent, 79th United States secretary of the treasury (2025–present)
- Todd Blanche, 88th United States attorney general (2026–present) and 40th United States deputy attorney general (2025–2026)
- Mike Braun, 52nd governor of Indiana (2025–present) and U.S. senator from Indiana (2019–2025)
- Spencer Cox, 18th governor of Utah (2021–present)
- Byron Donalds, governor-elect of Florida and U.S. representative from FL-19 (2021–present)
- Sean Duffy, 20th United States secretary of transportation (2025–present)
- Nikki Haley, 29th U.S. ambassador to the United Nations (2017–2018), 116th governor of South Carolina (2011–2017), and candidate for president in 2024
- Pete Hegseth, 29th United States secretary of defense (2025–present)
- Mike Johnson, 56th speaker of the United States House of Representatives (2023–present) and U.S. representative from LA-4 (2017–present)
- Ron Johnson, U.S. senator from Wisconsin (2011–present)
- Joe Kent, 8th director of the national counterterrorism center (2025–2026) and acting chief of staff to the director of national intelligence (2025) (endorsed Tucker Carlson)
- Dave McCormick, U.S. senator from Pennsylvania (2025–present)
- Linda McMahon, 13th United States secretary of education (2025–present), 25th Administrator of the Small Business Administration (2017–2019), member of the Connecticut State Board of Education (2009–2010), and Republican nominee for U.S. Senate in Connecticut in 2010 and 2012
- Candace Owens, far-right political commentator (endorsed Carlson)
- Brooke Rollins, 33rd United States secretary of agriculture (2025–present)
- Mitt Romney, businessman, U.S. senator from Utah (2019–2025), 70th governor of Massachusetts (2003–2007), candidate for president in 2008, and Republican nominee for president in 2012
- Marco Rubio, 72nd United States secretary of state (2025-present), U.S. senator from Florida (2011–2025) and candidate for president in 2016 (endorsed Vance)
- Donald Trump Jr., businessman and son of incumbent president Donald Trump (endorsed Vance)

== Primaries and caucus calendar ==
Caucuses and primaries in the 2028 Republican Party presidential primaries
Order	Total delegates	Primaries/caucuses
1	TBD	Iowa
2	TBD	New Hampshire
3	TBD	Nevada
4	TBD	South Carolina

The primary and caucus calendar is expected to be very similar to previous primaries, with the Republican National Committee (RNC) voting on a plan to maintain the same primary calendar in January 2026. Following a meeting with the RNC, Republican Party of Iowa Chairman Jeff Kaufmann stated that Iowa was likely to hold its status as the first caucus in the nation. South Carolina Republican Party Committeeman Tyson Grinstead also said that South Carolina would keep its status as the first Southern primary.

== Timeline ==
=== 2024 ===
- November 6: Donald Trump is declared the winner of the 2024 presidential election by a consensus of major news outlets projecting the results, defeating incumbent Vice President Kamala Harris.

=== 2025 ===
- January 20: Donald Trump and JD Vance are inaugurated as the 47th president and 50th vice president of the United States.
- February 22: Vice President Vance wins the 2025 CPAC presidential straw poll with 61%, with Steve Bannon in second at 12%.
- March 19: The New York Times reports that Trump and the Republican Party had threatened, signed executive actions, and ordered investigations into their political opponents, critics, and organizations aligned with the Democratic Party and progressive politics in an attempt to hobble Democrats' ability to compete in future elections.
- March 30: NBC reports that Trump would not rule out seeking a third term as president, with Trump saying he "was not joking" about a third term, and telling NBC "there are methods" for doing so, including running for vice president with JD Vance running for president and, upon winning, passing the role to Trump.
- April 24: The Trump Organization begins selling hats and T-shirts with "Trump 2028" written on them, provoking questions about whether or not Trump would attempt to run for a third term.
- May 4: Trump says in an interview with NBC News that he will only serve two terms as president and will not run again after winning twice, mentioning both Vance and Secretary of State Marco Rubio as his potential successors.
- September 30: In an Oval Office meeting with congressional leaders prior to the 2025 government shutdown, Trump displays red hats with "Trump 2028" emblazoned on the front.

=== 2026 ===
- March 28: Vice President Vance wins the 2026 CPAC presidential straw poll with 53%, with Marco Rubio in second at 35%.
- May 26: Television writer Dan Greaney announces his candidacy for the Republican nomination, marking the first candidate to be mentioned as declared in the press. His key policies include universal health care and the Green New Deal.
- June 8: Gregory Bovino, the former commander-at-large of the United States Border Patrol, forms an exploratory committee for a possible run for the Republican nomination.
- August 12: Former NBA basketball player Royce White announces his intention to run for the Republican nomination following his loss in the Republican primary for Senate in Minnesota.
- September 9–10: The 2026 Republican National Convention is held in Dallas, Texas.
- September 10: The Republican National Committee approves the 2028 Republican presidential nominating calendar, keeping Iowa as the first contest, followed by New Hampshire, Nevada and South Carolina.

== Endorsements ==
Chris Christie (undeclared)

State legislators

- Robert D. Clifton, New Jersey's AD-12 (2012–present)
Ted Cruz (undeclared)

Individuals

- Jeremy Boreing, podcaster and former CEO of The Daily Wire
Ron DeSantis (undeclared)

U.S. representatives

- Nancy Mace, SC-01 (2021–present)
Dan Greaney

Individuals

- Brent Forrester, comedian and writer
- Mieke Marple, writer (candidate's campaign manager)
Pete Hegseth (declined)

Executive branch officials

- Dan Bongino, former deputy director of the FBI (2025–2026)
Thomas Massie (undeclared)

Individuals

- Jack Dorsey, former CEO of Twitter and founder of Bluesky
Stephen Miller (undeclared)

Individuals

- Ann Coulter, conservative political activist
Marco Rubio (declined)

U.S. representatives

- Mike Haridopolos, FL-08 (2025–present)
- Marlin Stutzman, IN-03 (2010–2017; 2025–present)

Individuals

- Ken Griffin, entrepreneur and owner of Citadel LLC
- Sid Rosenberg, radio personality
- Stephen A. Smith, sports media personality (Independent; co-endorsed with Wes Moore and Josh Shapiro)
JD Vance (undeclared)

Executive branch officials

- Marco Rubio, secretary of state (2025–present)

U.S. senators

- Jim Banks, Indiana (2025–present)
- Bernie Moreno, Ohio (2025–present)

U.S. representatives

- Brandon Gill, TX-26 (2025–present)
- Anna Paulina Luna, FL-13 (2023–present)
- Riley Moore, WV-02 (2025–present)

Statewide officials

- Glenn Youngkin, former governor of Virginia (2022–2026)

State legislators

- Kenny Cody, Tennessee's HD-11 (2026–present)

Individuals

- Erika Kirk, CEO of Turning Point USA and widow of Charlie Kirk
- Donald Trump Jr., businessman and son of president Donald Trump

Organizations

- Turning Point Action
Declined to endorse

Executive branch officials

- Donald Trump, president of the United States (2017–2021, 2025–present)

U.S. senators

- Ted Cruz, Texas (2013–present) (declined to endorse Vance)
- Barry Moore, Alabama-elect
- Rand Paul, Kentucky (2011–present) (declined to endorse Vance)

U.S. representatives

- Randy Fine, FL-06 (2025–present) (endorsed against Vance)

Statewide officials

- Spencer Cox, governor of Utah (2021–present)
- Kevin Stitt, governor of Oklahoma (2019–present)

Individuals

- Brian Kilmeade, television and radio host (endorsed against Vance)

== Campaign financing ==
This is an overview of the money used by each campaign as it is reported to the Federal Election Commission (FEC). Per the Federal Election Campaign Act 1971, all contributions by an individual are itemized (catalogued) by the FEC when the total value of their contributions exceeds $200. Campaign finance reports for the first quarter of 2027 will become available on January 31, 2027. This table does not include contributions made to Super PACs or party committees supporting the candidate. Each value is rounded up to the nearest dollar.

Overview of campaign financing for candidates in the 2028 Republican Party presidential primaries through Q3 2026 (September 30, 2026)
Candidate	Total raised	Individual contributions	Individual unitemized contributions	Pct individual contributions	Pct unitemized contributions	Spent	Debt	Cash on hand
Greaney	$78,023	$22,841	$3,740	29.3%	16.4%	$46,452	$55,182	$31,481
White	$0	$0	$0	0.0%	0.0%	$0	$0	$0

== Opinion polling ==
=== Nationwide ===
Local regression graph of all polls conducted after the 2024 election

Aggregator	Updated	Ted Cruz	Ron DeSantis	Robert F. Kennedy Jr. (Note: Although Robert F. Kennedy Jr. is registered as Independent, he is often polled with Republicans.)	Marco Rubio	Donald Trump Jr. (Note: Donald Trump Jr. has denied interest in being a candidate.)	JD Vance	Other	Lead
270toWin	September 29, 2026	3.0%	8.7%	5.7%	17.0%	14.0%	36.8%	21.5% (Note: Nikki Haley 4.0%, Tucker Carlson 3.0%, Greg Abbott 2.0%, Marjorie Taylor Greene 2.0%, Vivek Ramaswamy 2.0%, Sarah Huckabee Sanders 1.5%, Josh Hawley 1.5%, Tom Cotton 1.0%, Pete Hegseth 1.0%, Rand Paul 1.0%, Rick Scott 1.0%, Tim Scott 1.0%, Glenn Youngkin 0.5%)	Vance +19.8%
Real Clear Polling	November 20, 2026	2.8%	10.2%	2.7%	35.4%	—	34.0%	6.6% (Note: Nikki Haley 2.3%, Tucker Carlson 3.0%, Glenn Youngkin 1.0%, Brian Kemp 0.5%)	Rubio +1.4%
Average		2.75%	8.1%	5.55%	21.7%	11.9%	37.7%	—	Vance +16.0%

=== Statewide ===
JD Vance Marco Rubio No polls conducted

== See also ==
- 2028 Republican National Convention
- 2028 Democratic Party presidential primaries
- 2028 Democratic National Convention
