= Tennessee House of Representatives 11th district =

State legislative district in Tennessee

Tennessee's 11th State House of Representatives district
- Map of Tennessee House districts with the 11th District shaded in red
Representative
Kenny Cody; R–Cosby
since 2011
- Demographics: 90.3% White; 1.9% Black; 4.6% Hispanic; 0.5% Asian; 2.5% Multiracial
- Population (2024): 73,272

The Tennessee House of Representatives 11th district is one of the 99 legislative districts in the lower house of the Tennessee General Assembly. The district is located in East Tennessee and covers Cocke and parts of Hamblen, and Jefferson counties. The district includes White Pine, Baneberry, Newport, most of Jefferson City, and part of Morristown. Douglas Lake runs through the middle-west portion of the district. The rest of the district is unincorporated and mostly rural. Jeremy Faison has represented the district since 2011.

== Demographics ==
The Tennessee Comptroller estimates the population as of 2024 at 73,272.

- 90.3% of the district is White
- 4.6% of the district is Hispanic
- 1.9% of the district is Black
- 0.5% of the district is Asian
- 2.5% of the district is Two or more races

Detailed demographic information is also available through Census Reporter.

== History ==
The 88th Tennessee General Assembly was the first in which all districts were numbered. At this time, the 11th district was in Cocke and Sevier counties. From the 89th-90th GAs, it was composed of Cocke, Jefferson, Blount, and Sevier counties. From the 91st-93rd GAs, it was composed of Cocke and Jefferson counties. From the 94th-97th GAs, it was composed of Cocke and Sevier counties. From the 98th-107th GAs, it was composed of Cocke and part of Greene counties. From the 108th-112th GAs, it was composed of Cocke and parts of Jefferson and Greene counties. Since the 113th General Assembly, it has been composed of Cocke and parts of Hamblen, and Jefferson counties.

== List of Representatives ==
Representative	Party	Years of Service	General Assembly	Hometown
Kenny Cody	Republican	2026-present	115th	Cosby
Jeremy Faison	Republican	2011-2026	107th-114th	Cosby
Eddie Yokley	Democratic	2003-2010	103rd-106th	Greeneville
Ronnie Davis	Republican	1985-2002	94th-102rd	Newport
Nathan F. Ford	Republican	1977-1984	90th-93rd	Newport
Hobart Ford	Republican	1969-1976	86th-89th	Newport
