= Jeremy Faison =

American politician (born 1976)

Member of the Tennessee House of Representatives from the 11th district
- In office January 11, 2011 – November 3, 2026
- Preceded by: Eddie Yokley
- Succeeded by: Kenny Cody

Personal details
- Born: September 14, 1976 (age 50) Monroe, Georgia, U.S.
- Party: Republican
- Spouse: Miriam Faison
- Children: 5
- Education: Clearwater Christian College (attended)
- Website: House website

Jeremy Faison (born September 14, 1976) is an American politician and businessman serving as a Republican member of the Tennessee House of Representatives, representing the 11th district, which includes all of Cocke County and part of Hamblen and Jefferson counties. He has held office since 2011 and is a member of the Republican Party.

Faison serves as Chairman of the Tennessee House Republican Caucus, and has been involved in several legislative committees, including Finance, Commerce, Government Operations, and Rules.

== Biography ==
Born in Monroe, Georgia, Faison resides in Cosby, Tennessee where he and his family own and operate a pest and wildlife control business. He is active in his community and church, where he served as worship leader. He is a past president of the Cocke County Republican Party and member of the Cocke County Chamber of Commerce.

In 2010, he defeated Eddie Yokley to become Tennessee State Representative for District 11, where he has served since 2011. He has been given an "A" grade by the NRA Political Victory Fund, the NRA's political lobbying arm which supports 2nd Amendment rights.

On February 1, 2019, Faison was severely injured in a car crash in Smith County, Tennessee. Faison survived and was taken to the hospital, with a broken nose and cracked ribs; he also received stitches in his head. He acknowledged that he was not wearing a safety belt at the time of the incident.

On January 4, 2022, Faison attended a high school basketball game in which his son was involved in; when a confrontation between the teams occurred during the match, Faison walked onto the court, shouted at a referee, and tried to pull the referee's pants down. The Tennessee Secondary School Athletic Association reported that before pulling the referee's pants, Faison told the referee: "You can't tell me to leave the floor, this was your fault". The referee asked that police be called to respond, but no call was made. Faison was made to leave the venue. Later that day, Faison wrote on social media that he "acted the fool tonight and lost my temper", explaining that he wanted the referee to "fight" him; Faison also wrote that he wished to ask for "forgiveness" from the referee.

In 2023, Faison supported a resolution to expel Democratic lawmakers from the legislature for violating decorum rules. The expulsion was widely characterized as unprecedented.

On January 15th, 2026, Faison announced he would not seek re-election to the State House, ending his 16-year, 8-term career in the legislature.

In March 2026, Faison sponsored legislation to track transgender individuals in Tennessee who sought gender-affirming care.
