= Kenny Cody =

American politician (born 1996)

Member-elect of the Tennessee House of Representatives from the 11th district
- Assuming office November 3, 2026
- Succeeding: Jeremy Faison

Personal details
- Born: February 7, 1996 (age 30) Knoxville, Tennessee, U.S.
- Party: Republican
- Education: University of Tennessee, Knoxville (BA); Tusculum University (MA); Lincoln Memorial University (Ed.S.)
- Website: Campaign website

Kenny D. Cody (born February 7, 1996) is an American politician who was elected a member of the Tennessee House of Representatives in 2026, representing District 11, which includes all of Cocke County and part of Hamblen and Jefferson counties. From 2019 to 2026, he served as chairman of the Republican Party in Cocke County. Cody is an educator for the Cocke County School System and previously served as opinion editor for the conservative newspaper Human Events.

== Early life ==
Born in Knoxville, Tennessee in 1996, Cody has resided in Cosby, Tennessee for all of his life. He graduated from Cosby High School before earning his BA from the University of Tennessee, Knoxville, his Masters in Teaching from Tusculum University, and his Educational Specialist Degree from Lincoln Memorial University.

== Career ==
He has been an educator for most of his career, teaching at the elementary and high school levels for the Cocke County School System.

Cody previously served as former State Representative Jeremy Faison's campaign manager in his re-election campaign in 2018 before successfully running for chairman of the Cocke County Republican Party in 2019, holding the position until his candidacy for State Representative in 2026. Cody is also a conservative columnist, writing articles on the nationalist-populist movement and Trumpism in the Republican Party for outlets like Newsmax, The Daily Wire, and Townhall.com since 2020. He also served as opinion editor for far-right publication Human Events from 2025-2026.

== Tennessee House of Representatives ==
=== Campaign ===
Shortly after incumbent Jeremy Faison announced retirement, Cody officially announced his candidacy for the Republican nomination for House District 11 State Representative on January 16th, 2026 with a platform prioritizing public safety, "safeguarding" families through Christian conservative values, and cutting red-tape regulation. He faced off against fellow educator Jeff Fancher in the August 6th Republican Primary, defeating Fancher 70.8% to 29.2%. He then advanced to the general election, where he faced Democrat Sheila Grooms McMahan and independent Jeremiah Brown. He won in the November 3rd, 2026 general election with 73.2% of the vote. During the Republican primary, Cody earned an endorsement from President Donald Trump, and later received an endorsement from Vice President JD Vance during the general election.
