= Artie D. Valentine =

American politician (1927–2020)

Artie Delmar Valentine

Member of the Nevada Assembly for Sparks-Sun Valley-Roop
- In office November 1956 – November 1958; November 1960 – November 1966; November 1970 – November 1972

Personal details
- Born: August 25, 1927 Cosby, Tennessee, U.S.
- Died: November 14, 2020 (aged 93)
- Party: Democratic
- Spouse: Faye Smith Valentine
- Profession: conductor, businessman

Artie D. Valentine (August 25, 1927 – November 14, 2020), was an American politician who was a Democratic member of the Nevada Assembly. He was Majority Leader in 1964. Valentine was a conductor with the Southern Pacific Transportation Company and the president of Autoland, Inc.
