= Ken Arensbak =

Danish lithographer and artist

Knud "Ken" Arensbak (1923–1997) was a Danish-born lithographer and artist who, along with his wife Neta (born Agnete), is best known for making fanciful handcrafted figures of trolls in the Great Smoky Mountains of Tennessee, United States. The family still operates 5 Arts Studio, which makes and sells Arensbak trolls to collectors all over the world.

Arensbak and his wife moved from post-war Denmark to Montreal, Quebec, Canada, in 1949. They started a family, then moved to Columbus, Ohio. Arensbak made his first trolls in 1959, to give to his children and neighbors who liked the folk stories he had told them about trolls. Ken's first love was painting, though, and so that he might have more time to pursue his passion, during the 1960s his wife and children took up the job of making trolls to sell in the local shops.

On his retirement in 1971, Arensbak moved with his family to Tennessee. 5 Arts Studio (so named for the five members of the Arensbak family at the time of the company's founding) is still located in Cosby, Tennessee and family operated.

The trolls are made from tree trunk bases that are covered in natural fiber with jute mustaches and eyebrows. All are decorated with nuts and seeds, or small ornaments which denote their job or passion. According to the informational cards packaged with them, the "age" of an Arensbak troll is determined by multiplying its height — ranging in size from 4" to 52" tall — by ten; thus, a 12" troll is said to be 120 years old. Most trolls are created with a natural theme in mind, though there are many modern jobs that have been chosen for more specialized designs, such as the "soccer troll" or the "fire fighter troll". Most trolls come in either male or female models, standard or albino in color.
