= 2028 Democratic Party presidential primaries =

Selection of the Democratic Party nominee

- January 22, 2028, to TBD

TBD delegates to the Democratic National Convention
Previous Democratic nominee
Kamala Harris

Presidential primaries and caucuses will be organized by the Democratic Party to select delegates to the 2028 Democratic National Convention to determine the party's nominee for president in the 2028 election. The primaries and caucuses will take place in all 50 U.S. states, in the District of Columbia, in five U.S. territories, and by Democrats Abroad.

== Candidates ==
=== Other Candidates ===
Candidate	Born	Most recent position	Home state	Campaign
Daryl W. Scott	Unknown	2022 Democratic nominee for South Carolina's 7th congressional district	South Carolina	Website

=== Expressed interest ===
Individuals who have expressed an interest in running for the Democratic presidential nomination (Note: Individuals listed below have, as of October 2026, personally expressed an interest in seeking the 2028 Democratic Party presidential nomination in at least two reliable media sources in the last six months.)
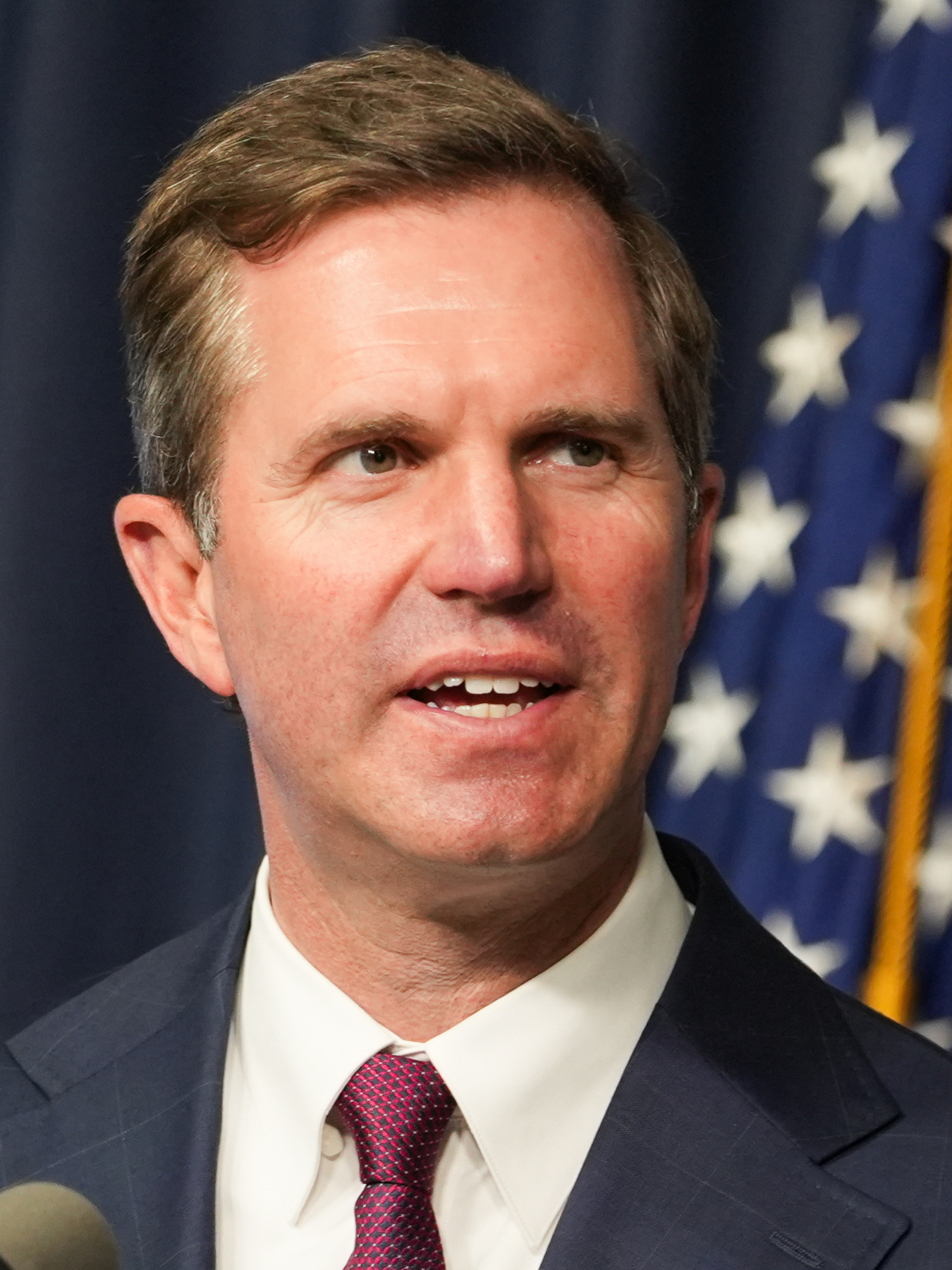
Governor
Andy Beshear
of Kentucky
(2019–present)

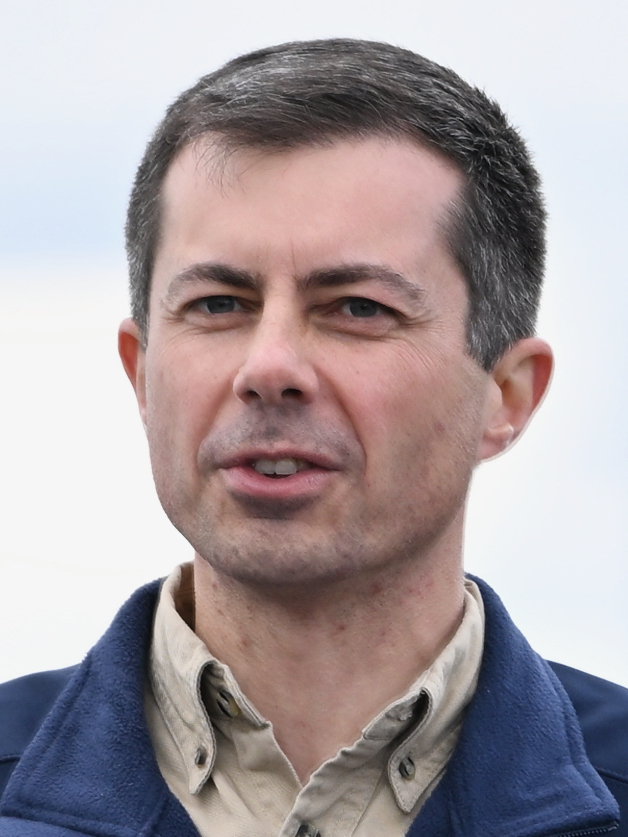
Former Secretary of Transportation
Pete Buttigieg
from Michigan
(2021–2025)

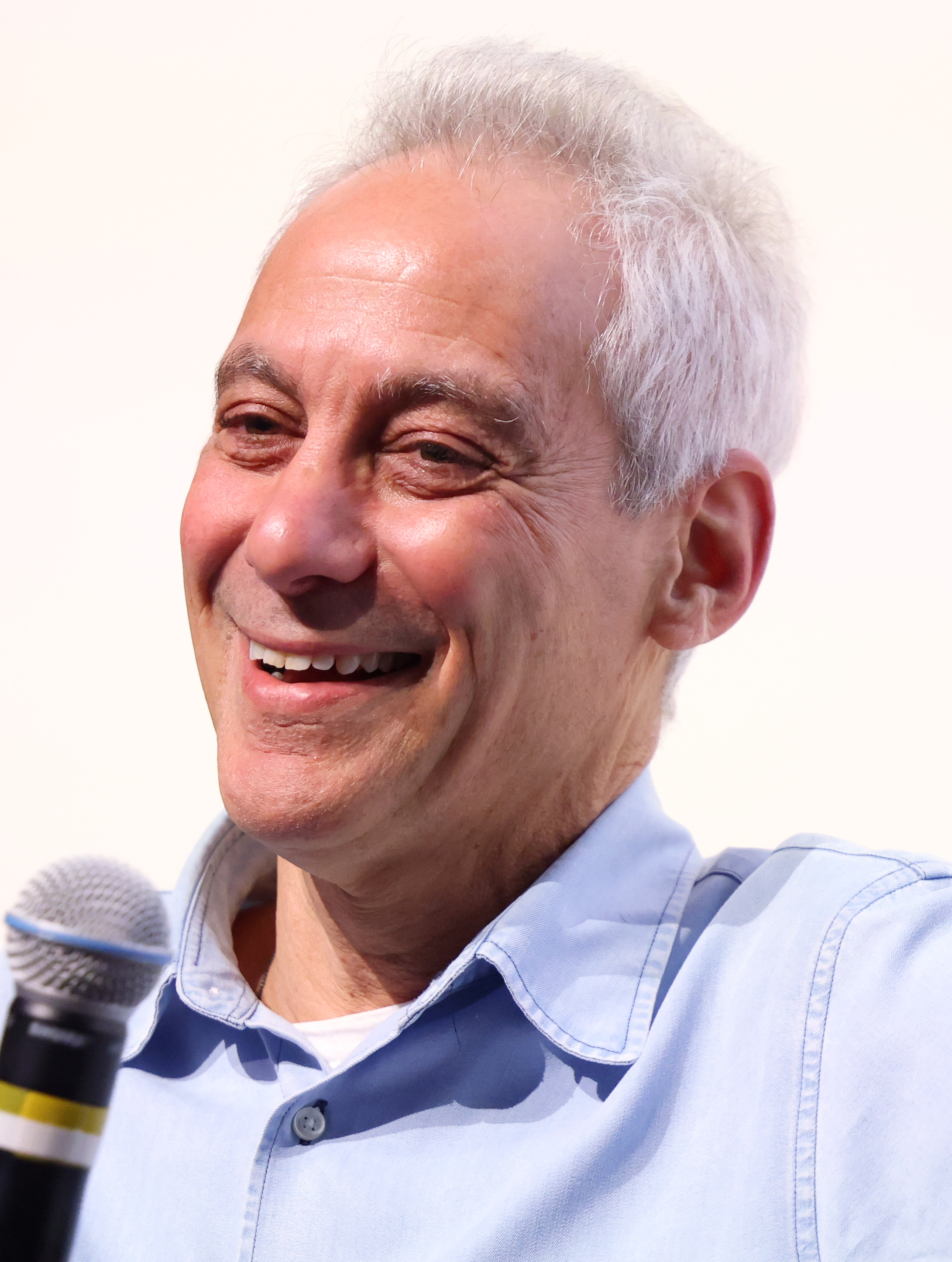
Former Ambassador
Rahm Emanuel
from Illinois
(2022–2025)

Senator
Ruben Gallego
from Arizona
(2025–present)

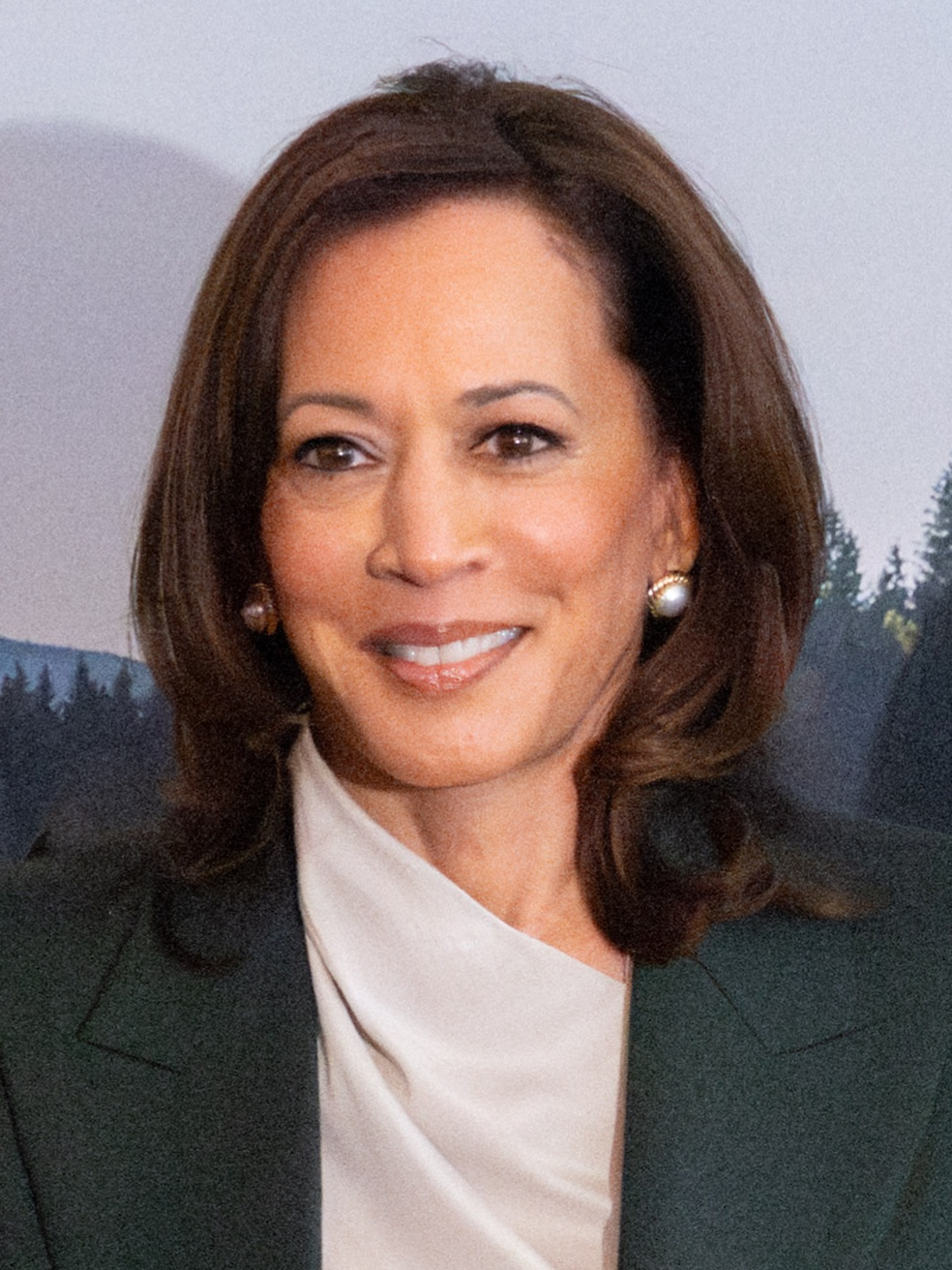
Former vice president and 2024 Democratic presidential nominee
Kamala Harris
from California
(2021–2025)

Senator
Mark Kelly
from Arizona
(2020–present)

Representative
Ro Khanna
from California
(2017–present)

Political commentator
Don Lemon
from New York

Governor
Gavin Newsom
of California
(2019–present)
(decision expected in early January 2027; will not run if Harris runs)

Representative
Alexandria Ocasio-Cortez
from New York
(2019–present)

Senator
Elissa Slotkin
from Michigan
(2025–present)

Governor
Gretchen Whitmer
of Michigan
(2019–present)

==== Andy Beshear ====
Andy Beshear has served as the 63rd governor of Kentucky since 2019. He was also considered a potential running mate for Kamala Harris during the 2024 presidential election. Beshear stated in a May 2026 interview with Ali Vitali of MS NOW that he would not make a decision on entering the presidential race until his tenure as the head of the Democratic Governors Association concludes. Beshear's frequent travel in 2026 increased speculation in June that he was preparing for a presidential campaign.

==== Pete Buttigieg ====
Pete Buttigieg served as the United States secretary of transportation from 2021 to 2025. Prior to becoming secretary of transportation, he served as mayor of South Bend, Indiana, from 2012 to 2020. Buttigieg ran for president in 2020, where he narrowly won the Iowa caucus and finished a close second in the New Hampshire primary, but ultimately dropped out after a poor performance in South Carolina. Buttigieg was also a contender to be Vice President Kamala Harris' running mate after she secured the Democratic nomination for president upon Biden's withdrawal from the election. If nominated, Buttigieg would be the first openly gay individual to receive the nomination of a major party in the United States.

Buttigieg was shown to be leading some polls for the Democratic primary in May 2026. On August 3, 2026, Buttigieg indicated in a podcast interview with Steven Bartlett that he was "more inclined than not" to launch another presidential bid. Later that month, Buttigieg campaigned in South Carolina ahead of the 2026 United States elections, which led to speculation that he was expecting to launch a presidential run.

==== Rahm Emanuel ====
Rahm Emanuel most recently served as United States ambassador to Japan from 2022 to 2025. He represented Illinois in the United States House of Representatives for three terms from 2003 to 2009. He was the White House Chief of Staff from 2009 to 2010 under President Barack Obama and served as mayor of Chicago from 2011 to 2019. Emanuel ran a bike tour in early primary state New Hampshire in June 2026, leading to speculation of a presidential run.

==== Ruben Gallego ====
Ruben Gallego has served as the junior U.S. senator from Arizona since 2025. Gallego stated in July 2026 that he was considering a presidential run, emphasizing that he was a Democrat who had been successful in a red state. He confirmed in October that he was considering running for president while presenting an economic plan based on taxes on artificial intelligence companies and data centers.

==== Kamala Harris ====
Kamala Harris served as the 49th (and first female) vice president of the United States from 2021 to 2025. She became the party's nominee for president in the 2024 presidential election after President Joe Biden withdrew from the race, losing to Trump. Following the 2024 presidential election, Harris considered running for governor of California in 2026, but in July 2025 she opted not to, a decision that left open the possibility of another presidential bid.

She was mentioned as a possible candidate in a June 2026 ABC News article. Harris gave a speech at the National Urban League in July that was speculated to be the basis of a 2028 presidential platform. On October 14, 2026, Harris said in an interview with Keke Palmer that she was still undecided on whether she will run for president in 2028, saying that her focus was on the 2026 midterms.

==== Mark Kelly ====
Mark Kelly has served as the senior U.S. senator from Arizona since 2020. He was previously on the shortlist to be the vice presidential nominee for the 2024 election, and was seen as a potential replacement for President Joe Biden before he withdrew from the race. It was reported in July 2026 that Kelly has amassed a war chest of $25 million, with contentions that he may run for president. Kelly spoke in August 2026 about the possibility of running for president.

==== Ro Khanna ====
Ro Khanna has served as the U.S. representative for California's 17th congressional district since 2017. A progressive aligned with the Bernie Sanders wing of the Democratic Party, he was a co-chair of Sanders's 2020 presidential campaign. In June 2026, Politico reported that former White House Chief of Staff Ron Klain has been advising Khanna "as he prepares for a possible 2028 presidential bid."

In July 2026, Khanna was detained by the IDF alongside Cameron Kasky and Nadav Weiman, the executive director of the Israeli NGO Breaking the Silence, after trying to visit the ruins of the ruined Palestinian Bedouin village of Khirbet Zanuta. When Reuters prompted him on the question of a presidential bid, he said, "I'm strongly considering it and I'm more resolved to consider it after this trip."

In November 2026, allies of Khanna formed the "Run Ro" group, which would prepare for a 2028 Khanna presidential campaign. Jamaal Bowman and Nomiki Konst are co-chairs of the group.

==== Don Lemon ====
Don Lemon worked as a television news anchor for CNN from 2006 to 2023. He previously served as a correspondent and host on several CNN programs, including Don Lemon Tonight. Following his departure from CNN, Lemon launched independent media projects and public commentary programs, such as The Don Lemon Show. Although he is a registered independent, Lemon stated in April 2026 that he would register as a Democrat if he were to run for president. On May 6, 2026, during the Sir Harry Evans Investigative Journalism Summit, Lemon revealed his ambitions towards a potential candidacy, expressing that he was "seriously considering" a presidential run. A fierce critic of Donald Trump, Lemon stated in a May interview with journalist Kara Swisher that he could "definitely run the country a lot better than Donald Trump." He reiterated his interest in running for president in a July 2026 podcast interview with Travis Dhanraj and Karmen Wong, remarking that he was unimpressed with most of the prospective candidates and that significant political experience was no longer a requisite for public office. Lemon stated in an October 2026 podcast interview with Spencer Macnaughton that there was a "65, 70" percent chance that he would run for president.

==== Gavin Newsom ====
Gavin Newsom has served as the 40th governor of California since 2019. He is ineligible to seek a third term as governor under the state's constitution and is scheduled to leave office in January 2027. He was seen as a potential replacement for Biden after his withdrawal from the 2024 election by The New York Times. According to The New York Times, Newsom was considering a bid for the presidency by September 2023. After Newsom's response to the June 2025 Los Angeles protests, it was reported that his chances of being the 2028 Democratic nominee increased significantly. Newsom was later asked if he was considering a run in July 2026, and he responded "I really believe it's fate." He traveled to early primary state South Carolina as part of a southern tour in late August, increasing belief that he may run for president. On September 14, 2026, Newsom told CNN's Jake Tapper that he won't run if Harris runs. On November 12, 2026, Newsom said he would make a decision to run for president by early January.

==== Alexandria Ocasio-Cortez ====
Alexandria Ocasio-Cortez has served as the representative of New York's 14th congressional district since 2019. Politico noted that Ocasio-Cortez "has a prominent following from younger, diverse people". Vanity Fair has reported that Ocasio-Cortez is reluctant to launch a presidential campaign and also noted that some have called for her to primary Chuck Schumer in the 2028 New York Senate elections. According to Axios, Ocasio-Cortez has been seen as the only option for "far-left" Democrats, and has attempted to make amends with leftist critics, including by pledging not to support defensive aid to Israel at a forum of the New York City chapter of the Democratic Socialists of America. David Smith, a writer for The Guardian, suggested in August 2026 that Ocasio-Cortez is becoming more popular with economic populist voters and universal healthcare as well as pointing to recent winning by democratic socialists. A September 2026 article in The Denver Gazette speculated on ways she may be able to overcome her electability weaknesses as a potential presidential candidate. That same month, she said that she will decide whether to run for president or for Schumer's Senate seat after the 2026 midterm elections.

==== Elissa Slotkin ====
Elissa Slotkin has served as the junior U.S. senator from Michigan since 2025. In November 2026, Slotkin said she was giving serious thought to running for president in 2028.

==== Gretchen Whitmer ====
Gretchen Whitmer has served as the 49th governor of Michigan since 2019. She is ineligible to seek a third term as governor under the state's constitution and is scheduled to leave office in January 2027. Whitmer cast doubt in early October 2025 on a 2028 presidential bid. That same month, she stated that she would not "close the door" on a run for president. She remarked in April 2026 that she was unsure of whether she would run.

She appeared to decline a run in May 2026 at the Mackinac Policy Conference and "backtracked" the same day, saying "never say never." Later in October, she stated on Meet the Press that a woman could be the best choice for the Democratic nomination, and did not deny that she was exploring a presidential run.

=== Speculated by the media ===
Potential Democratic candidates (Note: Individuals listed below have, as of October 2026, been mentioned as potential 2028 presidential candidates in at least two reliable media sources in the last six months.)
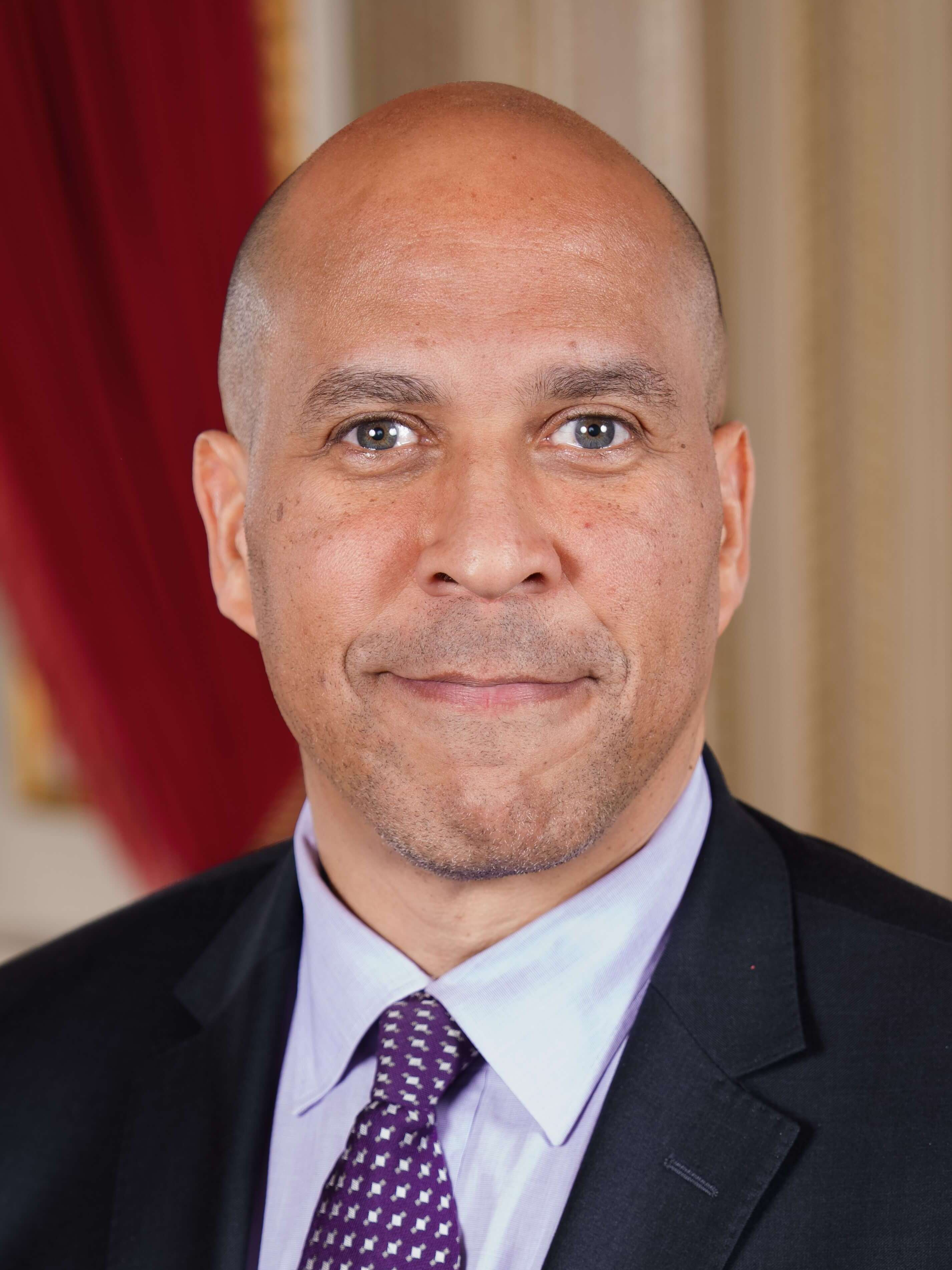
Senator
Cory Booker
from New Jersey
(2013–present)

Former Representative
Brad Carson
from Oklahoma
(2001–2005)

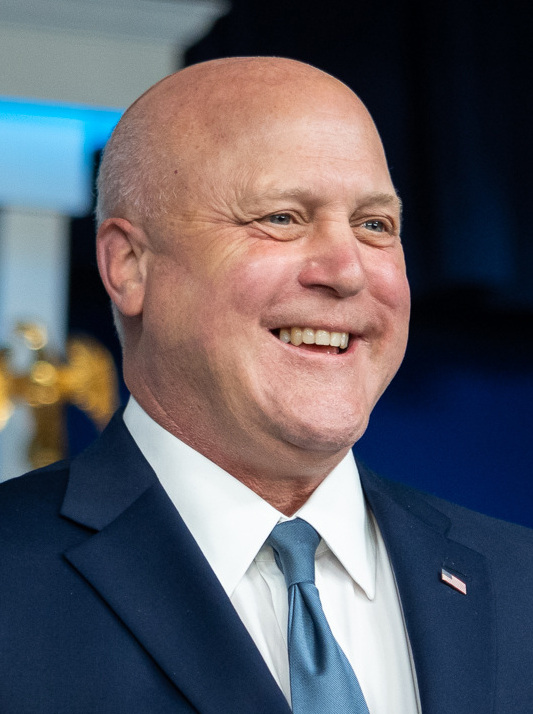
Former Mayor
Mitch Landrieu
of Louisiana
(2010–2018)

Governor
Wes Moore
of Maryland
(2023–present)

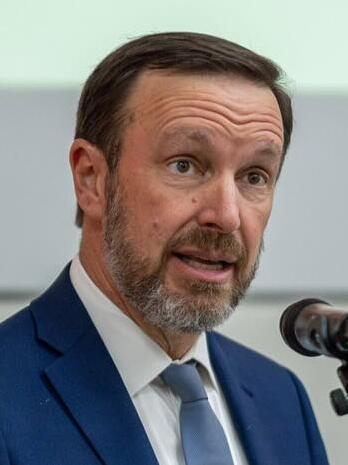
Senator
Chris Murphy
from Connecticut
(2013–present)

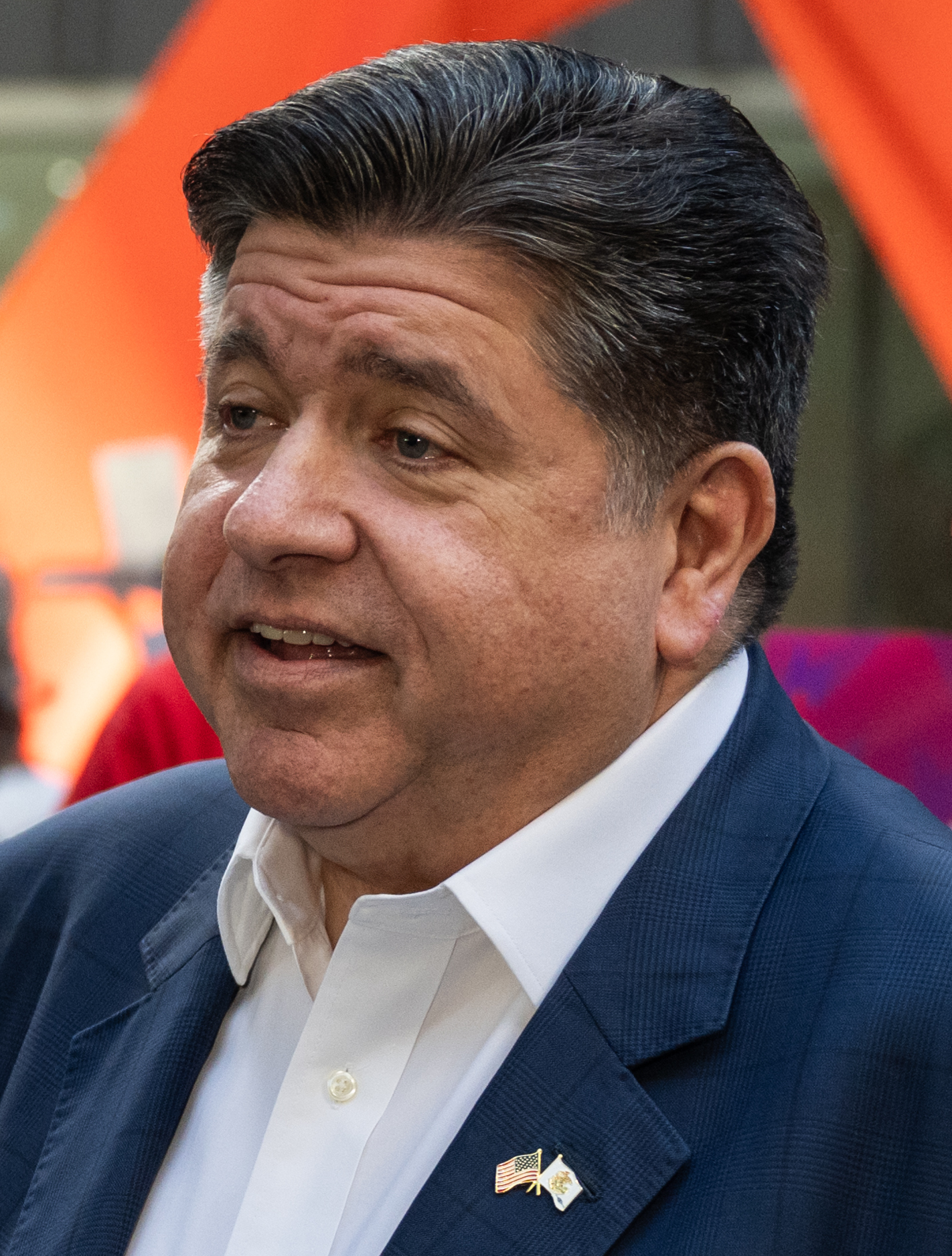
Governor
JB Pritzker
of Illinois
(2019–present)

Representative
Jamie Raskin
from Maryland
(2017–present)

Governor
Josh Shapiro
of Pennsylvania
(2023–present)

Senator
Raphael Warnock
from Georgia
(2021–present)

==== Cory Booker ====
Cory Booker is the senior United States senator from New Jersey and a former candidate for the 2020 Democratic presidential nomination. Booker has repeatedly expressed openness to another presidential campaign in 2028; in June 2026, he stated that he had "not written off running for president" and was "keeping that door open." Following his November reelection, Booker scheduled appearances in South Carolina, prompting renewed speculation about a potential presidential campaign. He stated in early November he had not decided whether to seek the Democratic nomination.

==== Brad Carson ====
Brad Carson served as the representative from Oklahoma's 2nd congressional district from 2001 to 2005. He was also the nominee for US Senate in 2004, which he lost to Tom Coburn. Subsequently, he served as the General Counsel of the Army, Under Secretary of the Army, acting Under Secretary of Defense for Personnel and Readiness, and president of the University of Tulsa. He is the co-founder of the AI safety nonprofit Americans for Responsible Innovation. On November 13, 2026, Politico reported Carson was planning to run for president, focusing on his credentials as an AI safety advocate.

==== Mitch Landrieu ====
Mitch Landrieu served as the 61st mayor of New Orleans from 2010 to 2018 and as lieutenant governor of Louisiana from 2004 to 2010. A Democrat, he is the son of former New Orleans mayor Moon Landrieu and the brother of former U.S. senator Mary Landrieu. After leaving the mayor's office, Landrieu served as a senior adviser to President Joe Biden and coordinated implementation of the Infrastructure Investment and Jobs Act. He subsequently served as a national co-chair of Kamala Harris's 2024 presidential campaign and as a co-chair of the 2024 Democratic National Convention.

Landrieu said in a September 2026 interview with Politico that he was considering a campaign for the 2028 Democratic presidential nomination. He said he would run if he believed he was best suited to win and could "bring the country together", and said he expected to make a decision sometime after the 2026 midterm elections or by early 2027.

He spoke with MS NOW in November at a post-midterm event in Denver and confirmed that he was interested in running for president.

==== Wes Moore ====
Wes Moore has served as the 63rd governor of Maryland since January 2023. A Democrat, Moore is the first African American governor of Maryland's history and the third African American elected governor in American history. Before entering politics, he served in the United States Army and was chief executive officer of the Robin Hood Foundation. Moore has been discussed as a potential Democratic contender in the 2028 United States presidential election. In October 2026, he campaigned for Democratic candidates in Virginia, prompting speculation about his presidential ambitions. Although he reiterated that he was focused on Maryland, he declined to explicitly commit to serving his entire second gubernatorial term. On November 11, Moore announced his forthcoming book Repair: Healing a Divided Nation, furthering speculation about a potential presidential campaign.

==== Chris Murphy ====
Chris Murphy is the junior United States senator from Connecticut. Following the 2024 United States presidential election, Murphy emerged as a prominent critic of Donald Trump and his administration, arguing that Democrats should adopt a more populist economic message and more forcefully challenge corporate power and government corruption. He has also taken a more prominent national role in Democratic politics, traveling around the country to support Democratic candidates and grassroots organizations. In November 2025, Punchbowl News reported that Murphy was considering a potential presidential campaign, although he said he was not currently planning to run, citing concerns about whether the 2028 election would be free and fair. In May 2026, Murphy released his book Crisis of the Common Good, prompting renewed speculation about his presidential ambitions. During a May 27 interview with CNN's Jake Tapper, Murphy was asked whether he was pitching himself for president. He responded, "No, I don't know what I'm going to do," and acknowledged that friends considering 2028 campaigns had contacted him about his book. CNN listed Murphy as a possible presidential candidate in November 2026.

==== JB Pritzker ====
JB Pritzker has served as the 43rd governor of Illinois since 2019. Pritzker is one of the wealthiest elected officials in America, with an estimated net worth of $3.7 billion, and has largely bankrolled his own gubernatorial campaigns, as well as national abortion-rights initiatives. Pritzker was considered a potential running mate to Kamala Harris in the 2024 presidential election. In 2023, Pritzker declined to speak directly with Representative Dean Phillips regarding his effort to try to convince him to enter the Democratic Party presidential primary race to oppose Biden. He declined to rule out a run in August 2025 and won a third term as governor of Illinois in 2026. Pritzker is a potential Democratic contender, according to November 2026 articles in Capitol Hill Illinois and Reuters.

==== Jamie Raskin ====
Jamie Raskin has served as the U.S. representative from Maryland's 8th congressional district since 2017. A Democrat, Raskin previously served in the Maryland Senate from 2007 to 2016 and was a law professor at American University. He gained national prominence as a member of the House Select Committee on the January 6 Attack and as the lead manager in Donald Trump's second impeachment trial. Following the 2026 elections, Raskin became a potential contender to chair the House Judiciary Committee if Democrats took control of the House. In November 2026, Raskin said he would give a potential 2028 presidential campaign "proper consideration," while emphasizing that his immediate focus was on leading the Judiciary Committee. He said that he would consider running if he believed he was the best candidate to win, but added that he did not have an "ego lust" for the presidency. Raskin had previously indicated that he would seriously consider a presidential campaign if Democratic colleagues believed he should run.

==== Josh Shapiro ====
Josh Shapiro has served as the 48th governor of Pennsylvania since 2023. Shapiro was elected in 2022 by 15 points in a state won by Donald Trump twice and is relatively popular in his home state. In 2024, he was considered a top contender for the vice presidential spot on Kamala Harris's presidential ticket. In 2026, Shapiro was re-elected governor by 20 percentage points. He has been viewed as a potential Democratic presidential candidate by ABC27 in May 2026.

During a 2026 gubernatorial debate with state treasurer Stacy Garrity, Shapiro declined to answer whether or not he would serve all four years of his second term. Shapiro also declined to answer a similar question asked by Bill Maher on his talk show. However, during a conversation with Al Sharpton, Shapiro stated that he wanted to be "part of the conversation" about the future direction of the Democratic Party.

==== Raphael Warnock ====
Raphael Warnock has served as the junior U.S. senator from Georgia since 2021. He was referred to as a potential candidate by Katie Couric Media in May 2026 and by Politico the following month. Warnock stated that he would run for a "high office" in 2028, but refused to specify if he was referring to a presidential campaign or re-election to the Senate in an early November interview with Jake Tapper. His October travel to South Carolina and other states ahead of the 2026 midterm election has also heightened speculation.

=== Declined to run ===
The following individuals have, as of November 2026, publicly denied interest in being a candidate:

- Jake Auchincloss, U.S. representative from MA-04 (2021–present)
- Jocelyn Benson, governor-elect of Michigan and 43rd Michigan secretary of state (2019–present)
- Hunter Biden, artist, businessman, and son of former president Joe Biden
- Bob Casey Jr., U.S. senator from Pennsylvania (2007–2025), 74th treasurer of Pennsylvania (2005–2007), and 47th Pennsylvania auditor general (1997–2005)
- Hillary Clinton, 67th United States secretary of state (2009–2013), U.S. senator from New York (2001–2009), first lady of the United States (1993–2001), and Democratic nominee for president in 2016
- Jasmine Crockett, U.S. representative from TX-30 (2023–present) and candidate for U.S. Senate in 2026
- Abdul El-Sayed, U.S. senator-elect from Michigan, former Wayne County, Michigan health director (2023–2025) and candidate for governor of Michigan in 2018
- Shawn Fain, president of the United Auto Workers (2023–present)
- Josh Gottheimer, U.S. representative from NJ-05 (2017–present) and candidate for governor of New Jersey in 2025
- Maura Healey, 73rd governor of Massachusetts (2023–present) and 44th Massachusetts attorney general (2015–2023)
- John Hickenlooper, U.S. senator from Colorado (2021–present), 42nd governor of Colorado (2011–2019), and candidate for president in 2020
- Amy Klobuchar, governor-elect of Minnesota, U.S. senator from Minnesota (2007–present), and candidate for president in 2020
- Michelle Obama, first lady of the United States (2009–2017)
- Jon Ossoff, U.S. senator from Georgia (2021–present)
- Jared Polis, 43rd governor of Colorado (2019–present) and U.S. representative from CO-02 (2009–2019)
- Gina Raimondo, 40th United States secretary of commerce (2021–2025) and 75th governor of Rhode Island (2015–2021)
- Rob Sand, governor-elect of Iowa and 33rd Iowa auditor of state (2019–present)
- Bernie Sanders, U.S. senator from Vermont (2007–present), U.S. representative from VT-AL (1991–2007), and candidate for president in 2016 and 2020 (Note: Sanders is an independent, but he caucuses with the Democratic Party.)
- Stephen A. Smith, sports media personality (endorsed Moore, Marco Rubio and Shapiro) (Note: Smith is a registered independent, but he has been polled amongst potential Democratic candidates and had expressed interest in running for president as a Democrat.)
- Tom Steyer, businessman, candidate for president in 2020, and candidate for governor of California in 2026
- James Talarico, U.S. senator-elect from Texas and Texas state representative (2018–present)
- Chris Van Hollen, U.S. senator from Maryland (2017–present) and U.S. representative from MD-08 (2003–2017)
- Tim Walz, 41st governor of Minnesota (2019–present), U.S. representative from MN-01 (2007–2019) and vice presidential nominee in 2024
- Jimmy Williams, president of the International Union of Painters and Allied Trades (2021–present)

== Primaries and caucus calendar ==
Caucuses and primaries in the 2028 Democratic Party presidential primaries
Date	Total delegates	Primaries/caucuses
January 22	TBD	South Carolina
February 1	TBD	Nevada
February 8	TBD	New Hampshire
February 15	TBD	New Mexico
February 22	TBD	Michigan
February 29	TBD	Virginia
March 7	TBD	Super Tuesday

=== Timing ===
Chair of the Nebraska Democratic Party Jane Kleeb stated in November 2024 that "The 2024 calendar will absolutely not be the calendar for 2028." The DNC chose South Carolina to be the first primary in 2024. In December 2024, Ray Buckley, chairman of the New Hampshire Democratic Party, announced his intention to work towards restoring New Hampshire's status as the first-in-the-nation Democratic presidential primary for the 2028 presidential nominating calendar. By early December 2024, Democrats in Nevada had renewed their bid to hold the first-in-the-nation primary in 2028, citing the state's economic and racial diversity, technical capability, cost for candidates and status as a battleground state.

Following technical problems complicating the 2020 Iowa Democratic presidential caucuses, the Democratic National Committee changed the order of nominating contests, removing Iowa's first in the nation status. In November 2024, after the presidential election, Scott Brennan, the only Iowan on the DNC Rules and Bylaws Committee at the time, said he planned to fight for the return of the first-in-the-nation presidential caucus spot back to Iowa. In June 2025, Iowa's only seat on the DNC's Rules and Bylaws Committee, which determines the order of states in the presidential nominating process, was removed, and New Hampshire was awarded a second seat on the committee.

Ken Martin, the chair of the Democratic National Committee and other party officials, including Representative Jamie Raskin of Maryland, have discussed the possibility of using ranked-choice voting in the 2028 Democratic presidential primaries. Supporters argue that the system could reduce "wasted votes" and that it would encourage more positive campaigning. Sources such as Alaska Beacon indicated that with plurality voting, which is how most states currently conduct primaries, it is possible to win an election without majority support and that the ranked-choice voting alternative performed much better. After Zohran Mamdani won the 2025 New York City Democratic mayoral primary, progressive voters have proposed that ranked-choice voting could be implemented.

In May 2026, Democratic leaders were debating whether South Carolina or Nevada should be the first contest; supporters of Nevada argued it was a battleground state with strong union presence and a large Hispanic population, while supporters of South Carolina argued passing over South Carolina would diminish the power of Black Democratic voters.

The DNC Rules and Bylaws Committee voted in July 2026 for South Carolina to hold the first primary and for Nevada, New Hampshire, New Mexico, Michigan and Virginia to hold early primaries. New Hampshire and Iowa could host their respective contests earlier than scheduled; New Hampshire state law requires the state to hold the first primary and Iowa Democrats threatened to hold their own contest to ensure they go early. The dates were approved by the entire Democratic National Committee on August 15.

== Endorsements ==
Ro Khanna (undeclared)

U.S. representatives

- Jamaal Bowman, former NY-16 (2021–2025)

Individuals

- Nomiki Konst, journalist, activist and 2019 candidate for public advocate of New York City
Wes Moore (undeclared)

Individuals

- Stephen A. Smith, sports media personality (Independent; co-endorsed with Shapiro and Marco Rubio)
Gavin Newsom (undeclared)

Individuals

- Reed Hastings, co-founder of Netflix
- Chris Larsen, co-founder and executive chairman of Ripple Labs
Alexandria Ocasio-Cortez (undeclared)

U.S. representatives

- Brad Lander, NY-10-elect
- Claire Valdez, NY-07-elect

State legislators

- Kristen Gonzalez, New York State Senator for the 59th district (2023–present)
- Aber Kawas, New York State Senator-elect for the 12th district
- Diana Moreno, New York State Assemblywoman for the 36th district (2026–present)
- Aaron Regunberg, former Rhode Island State Representative for the 4th district (2015–2019)

Local officials

- Antonio Reynoso, Brooklyn borough president (2022–present)
- Julie Won, New York City's CD-26 (2022–present)

International politicians

- Gustavo Petro, former president of Colombia (2022–2026) (Historic Pact)

Individuals

- Ben Mathis-Lilley, journalist
- Hasan Piker, streamer
- Bhaskar Sunkara, founding editor of Jacobin, president of The Nation, and former vice chair of Democratic Socialists of America

Organizations

- Atlanta Democratic Socialists of America
- Chicago Democratic Socialists of America
- Los Angeles Democratic Socialists of America
- Metro DC Democratic Socialists of America
- New York City Democratic Socialists of America
JB Pritzker (undeclared)

Individuals

- James Carville, political consultant and author
Josh Shapiro (undeclared)

Individuals

- Stephen A. Smith, sports media personality (Independent; co-endorsed with Moore and Rubio)
Stephen A. Smith (declined)

Individuals

- Bill Maher, television host, comedian, actor, and political commentator (Independent)
Jon Stewart (undeclared)

Individuals

- Charlamagne tha God, radio personality (Independent)

== Opinion polling ==
=== Nationwide ===
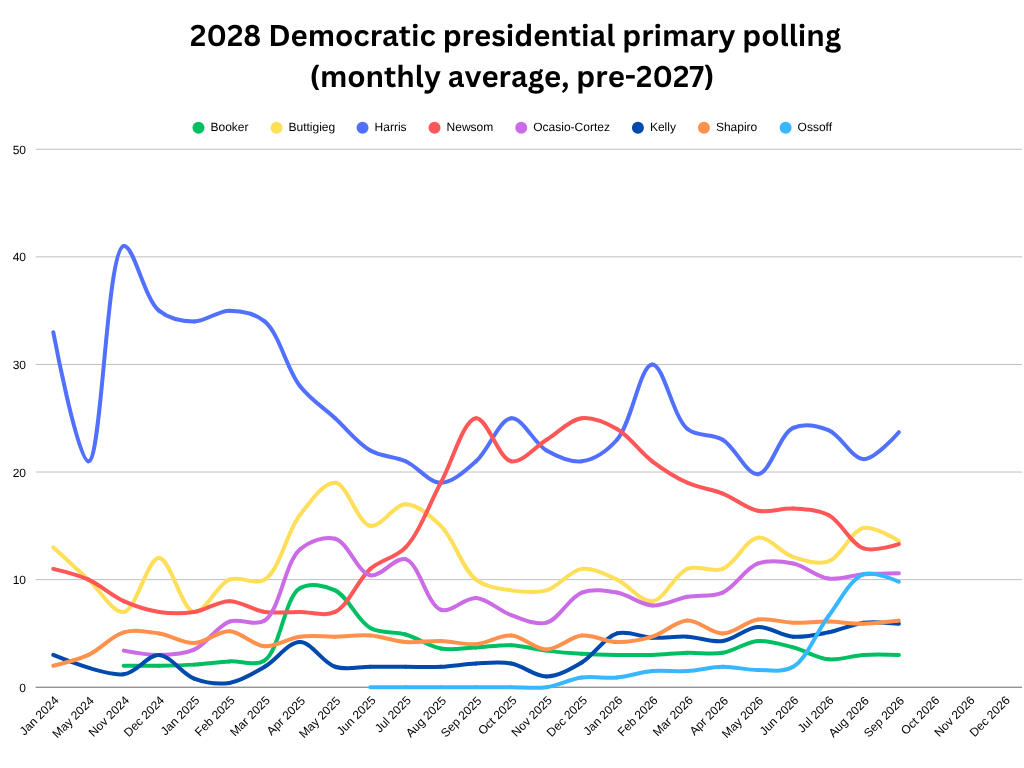
Monthly average of nationwide polling

Aggregator	Updated	Kamala Harris	Cory Booker	Pete Buttigieg	Mark Kelly	Gavin Newsom	Alexandria Ocasio-Cortez	Jon Ossoff	JB Pritzker	Josh Shapiro	Other	Lead
270toWin	November 6, 2026	30.3%	3.5%	10.0%	7.0%	14.3%	9.0%	7.0%	3.0%	5.0%	10.0% (Note: Andy Beshear with 2%, Stephen A. Smith with 2%, Gretchen Whitmer with 2%, Wes Moore with 1%, Chris Van Hollen with 1%, Raphael Warnock with 1%, Rahm Emanuel with 0.5%, Jared Polis with 0.5%)	Harris +16.0%
RealClearPolling	November 20, 2026	16.5%	2.0%	14.0%	5.5%	11.3%	14.0%	15.0%	3.0%	3.5%	4.0% (Note: Andy Beshear with 4%)	Harris +1.5%
Aggregate		23.4%	2.8%	12.0%	6.3%	12.8%	11.5%	11.0%	3.0%	4.3%	—	Harris +10.6%

=== Statewide ===
Pete Buttigieg Kamala Harris Gavin Newsom Alexandria Ocasio-Cortez Jon Ossoff Four or more candidates statistically tied No polls conducted

== See also ==
- 2028 Democratic National Convention
- 2028 Republican Party presidential primaries
- 2028 Republican National Convention
