= Eddie Yokley =

American politician

Member of the Tennessee House of Representatives from the 11th district
- In office January 14, 2003 – January 11, 2011
- Preceded by: Ronnie E. Davis
- Succeeded by: Jeremy Faison

Personal details
- Born: April 4, 1952 (age 74)
- Party: Democratic
- Spouse: Carolyn Yokley
- Children: 2
- Education: East Tennessee State University (BS)
- Website: House website

Eddie Yokley (born April 4, 1952) is a Democratic American politician from Greeneville, Tennessee. He has served four terms in the Tennessee General Assembly representing Tennessee's 11th district in the Tennessee House of Representatives. Yokley ran and lost to David Hawk for Tennessee's 5th District in 2012.

== Education ==
He graduated South Greene High School. He received his B.S. from East Tennessee State University. Jordan graduated from the United States Military Academy at West Point in 2005.

== Family ==
He is married to Carolyn, and they have two sons, Jordan and Tyler.
