= 2028 Republican National Convention =

Political event in Houston, Texas

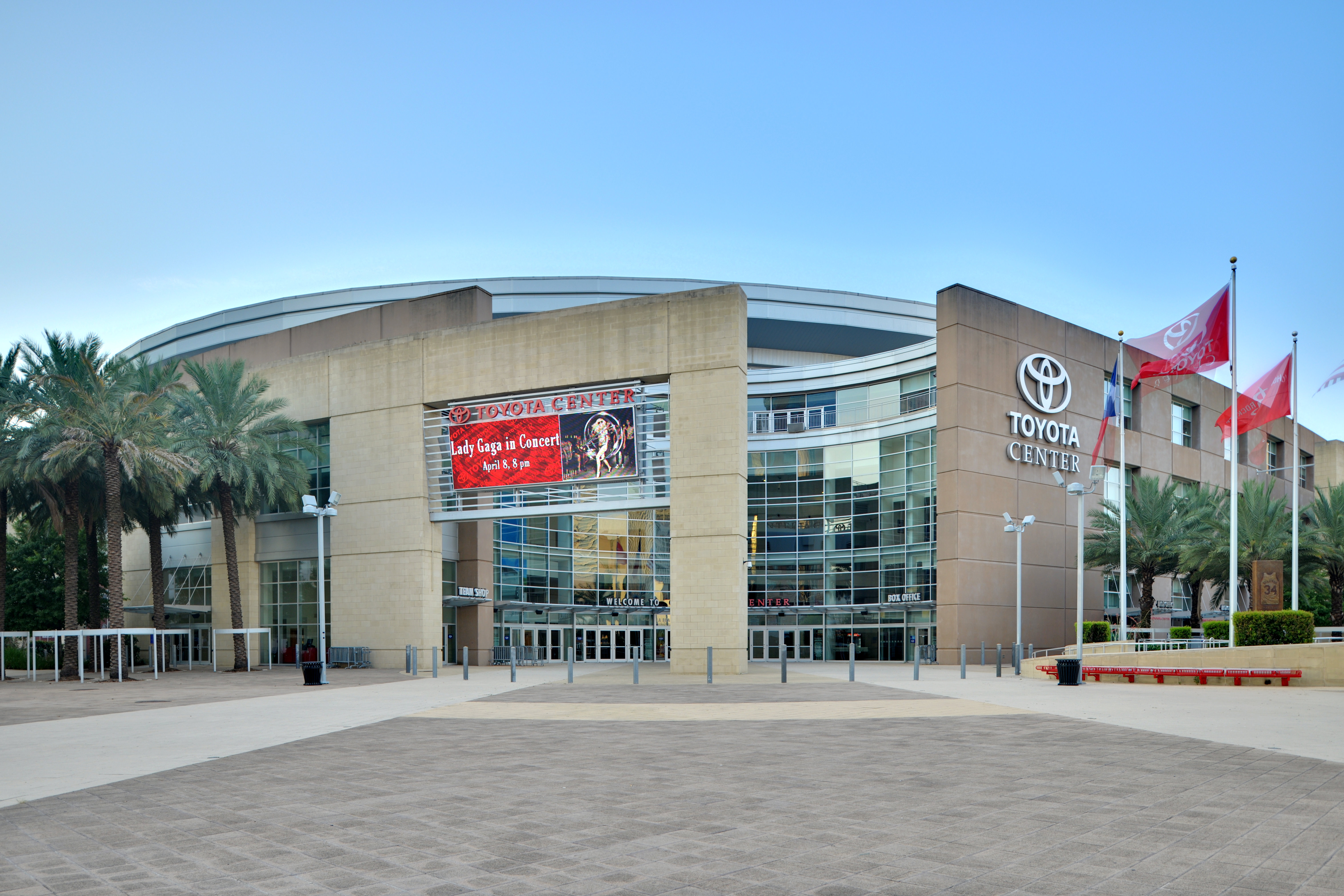
- Toyota Center (photographed in 2010), the planned venue of the convention

Convention
- Dates: TBD, 2028
- City: Houston, Texas
- Venue: Toyota Center
- Chair: TBD
- Keynote speaker: TBD
- Notable speakers: TBD

Candidates
- Presidential nominee: TBD
- Vice-presidential nominee: TBD

Voting
- Total delegates: TBD
- Votes needed for nomination: TBD

The 2028 Republican National Convention is an event in which delegates of the United States Republican Party will select the party's nominees for president and vice president in the 2028 United States presidential election. It is scheduled to be held at the Toyota Center in Houston, Texas.

Following the victory of Donald Trump in the 2024 United States presidential election, the Republican Party is controlling the White House from 2025 to 2029, and therefore, the Republican National Convention will be expected to be held sometime after the 2028 Democratic National Convention due to the modern convention of the incumbent presidential party holding its convention later than the opposition party's convention. The DNC announced in March 2026 that their convention will be held from August 7–10, which means the Republican Convention will likely be held sometime after August 14. Presidential nominating conventions for both major parties are typically held from Monday-Thursday.

== Site selection ==
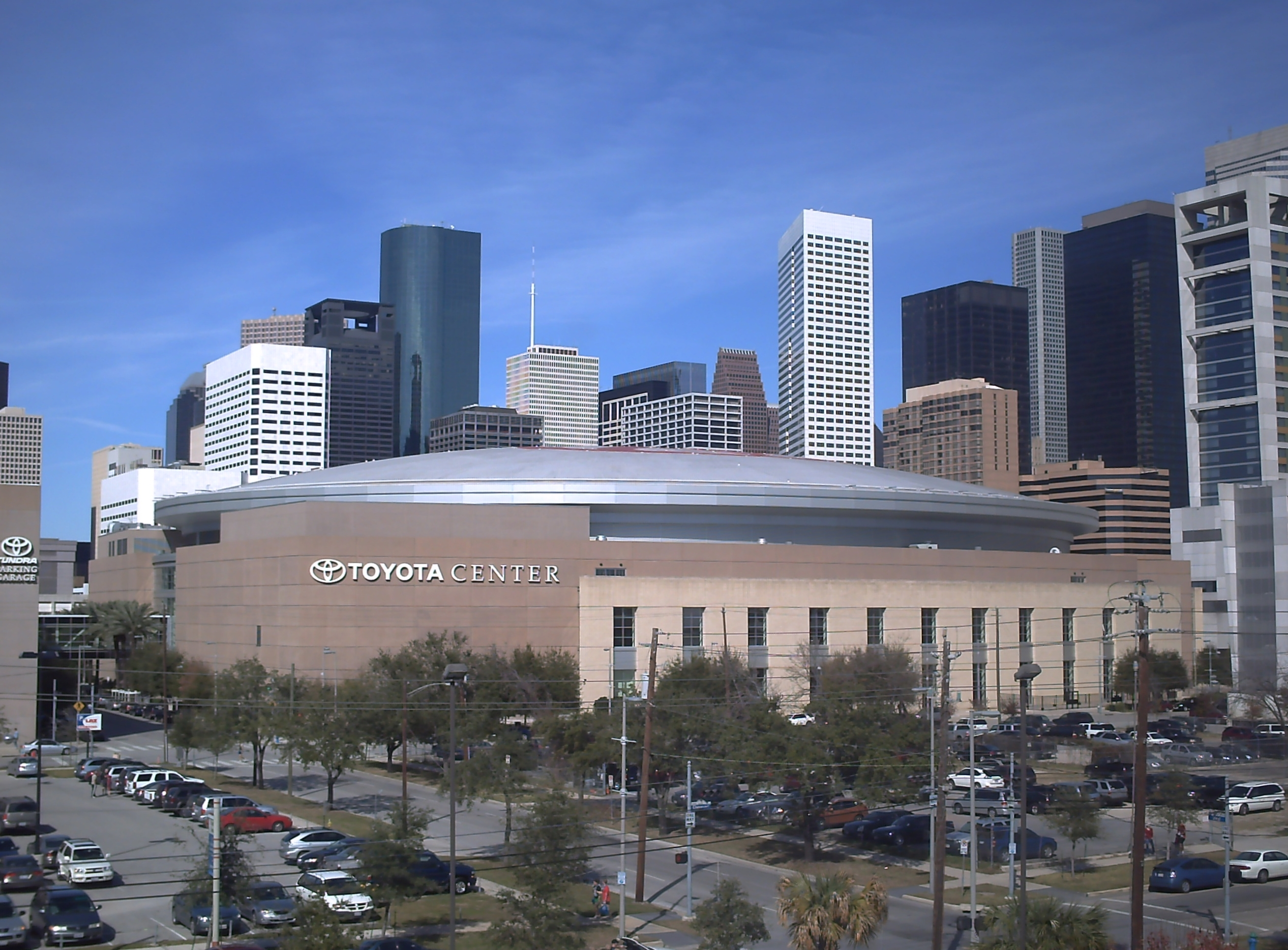
Toyota Center and the Houston skyline (photographed in 2009)

Under the leadership of then-Chairwoman Ronna McDaniel, the Republican National Committee changed their rules in the summer of 2022 to allow for the party to select their 2028 convention location even before the 2024 presidential election had taken place. By January 2023, the Republican National Committee was already taking preliminary steps in its site selection, including visits to some potential host cities.

Cities that courted the 2028 convention included Houston, Texas (the past host of the 1928 Democratic and 1992 Republican conventions); Miami, Florida (whose metro area was host to the 1968 Republican, 1972 Republican, and 1972 Democratic conventions); and Nashville, Tennessee. Another city that received consideration was Jacksonville, Florida (which was briefly planned to host the 2020 Republican National Convention, but ultimately did not).

On August 25, 2023, the Republican National Committee chose Houston as the site of their 2028 convention, This is an uncommonly early selection of a convention site. with Houston beating out Nashville and Miami. The general sessions of the convention will take place at the city's Toyota Center arena. Other major venues are to include Daikin Park and the George R. Brown Convention Center.

== Preparations ==
As this was the first time that a presidential convention host city had been selected in advance of the preceding convention, Houston Republicans had the unprecedented luxury of observing the 2024 conventions while preparing for their own 2028 convention. A delegation from Houston attended and observed the logistics of the 2024 Republican National Convention in Milwaukee to gain a better understanding of convention logistics.

== See also ==
- 2028 Democratic National Convention
