= 2028 Democratic National Convention =

U.S. political event with location to be determined

Convention
- Dates: August 7–10, 2028
- City: TBD
- Venue: TBD
- Chair: TBD
- Keynote speaker: TBD
- Notable speakers: TBD

Candidates
- Presidential nominee: TBD
- Vice-presidential nominee: TBD

Voting
- Total delegates: TBD
- Votes needed for nomination: TBD

The 2028 Democratic National Convention, scheduled to be held from August 7–10, 2028, is an event in which delegates of the United States Democratic Party will select the party's nominees for president and vice president in the 2028 United States presidential election.

As of August 2026, the Democratic National Committee narrowed the cities down to Boston, Denver, and Philadelphia. The final decision on which city will host the convention will be decided later in 2026.

== Host city selection ==
Bidding cities
City	State	Status	Proposed venue(s)	Previous major party conventions hosted by city
Boston	Massachusetts	Finalist (under consideration)	TD Garden (main venue); Boston Convention and Exhibition Center (secondary venue)	Democratic: 2004
Philadelphia	Pennsylvania	Finalist (under consideration)	Xfinity Mobile Arena (primary venue); Pennsylvania Convention Center (secondary venue)	Democratic: 1936, 1948, 2016; Republican: 1856, 1872, 1900, 1940, 1948, 2000; Whig: 1848
Denver	Colorado	Finalist (under consideration)	Ball Arena (primary venue); Colorado Convention Center (secondary venue)	Democratic: 1908, 2008
Atlanta	Georgia	Non-finalist (eliminated from consideration)	State Farm Arena (primary venue); Georgia World Congress Center (secondary venue)	Democratic: 1988
Chicago	Illinois	Non-finalist (eliminated from consideration)	United Center (primary venue); McCormick Place (secondary venue)	Democratic: 1864, 1884, 1892, 1896, 1932, 1940, 1944, 1952, 1956, 1968, 1996, 2024; Republican: 1860, 1868, 1880, 1884, 1888, 1904, 1908, 1912, 1916, 1920, 1932, 1944, 1952, 1960; Bull Moose Progressive: 1912, 1916

After the 2024 Democratic National Convention was held in Chicago, Governor of Illinois JB Pritzker, expressed interest in hosting the next convention as well. Chicago currently holds the record for the most convention of both parties, and the 2024 Democratic National Convention broke the record for the most funds raised, raising 93 million dollars. If chosen, it would be the first city since New York from 1976 and 1980 to have two consecutive Democratic conventions.

On July 3, 2025, Gina Ortiz Jones, the mayor of San Antonio, had reportedly inquired with the Democratic National Convention to urge them to choose her city as the site for the next convention. She stated that the city's history of boldness and inclusivity as well as the convention being an economic opportunity made it a good city to host it. That year, ethics complaint was filed by Bexar County Republican Chair Kyle Sinclair against Ortiz Jones for using official city letterhead for a letter to a Democratic National Committee supporting the bid, alleging that that this was an inappropriate use of city resources. The complaint was ultimately dismissed as lacking merit. If San Antonio had been chosen, it would have been the first Democratic National Convention since 1928 to be held in Texas.

On July 8, 2025, executive director of the Louisiana Democratic Party, Dadirus Lanus, that New Orleans officially made a bid for the 2028 convention. Lanus explained that the recent successes of the Super Bowl and the Essence Fest along with New Orleans being one of the most culturally diverse cities in the country are reasons why the city should host. The article also revealed that Los Angeles was a potential site for the 2028 convention.

On January 9, 2026, the mayor of Denver, Mike Johnston, announced that the city had officially submitted a bid to host the 2028 convention. The most recent Democratic convention in Denver occurred in 2008 when Barack Obama and Joe Biden were nominated for president and vice-president respectively. Before that, it hadn't hosted a Democratic convention since 1908 when William Jennings Bryan and John W. Kern were nominated for president and vice-president respectively. Boosters for Denver's bid stated that the city's accessibility through Denver International Airport and the A-Line to its downtown, its center's hotels, restaurants and cultural amenities, made it a worthy candidate in addition to Denver's track record in hosting big events.

On January 23, 2026, the Chicago Sun-Times reported that Chicago officials officially submitted bids for the 2028 or 2032 Democratic conventions. Those behind the bids stated that the Chicago's fundraising advantage makes it an ideal host. The article also stated that Atlanta, Boston, and Las Vegas were also likely to make bids for the two conventions.

In early March 2026, the Democratic National Committee shortlisted Atlanta, Chicago, Boston, Denver, and Philadelphia as prospective convention sites.

In August 2026, the Democratic National Committee named Boston, Denver, and Philadelphia as the finalist cities to host the convention. The committee is expected to announce who will host the convention later this year.

== See also ==
- 2028 Republican National Convention
