= Cosby, Tennessee =

- Census-designated place
- Cosby
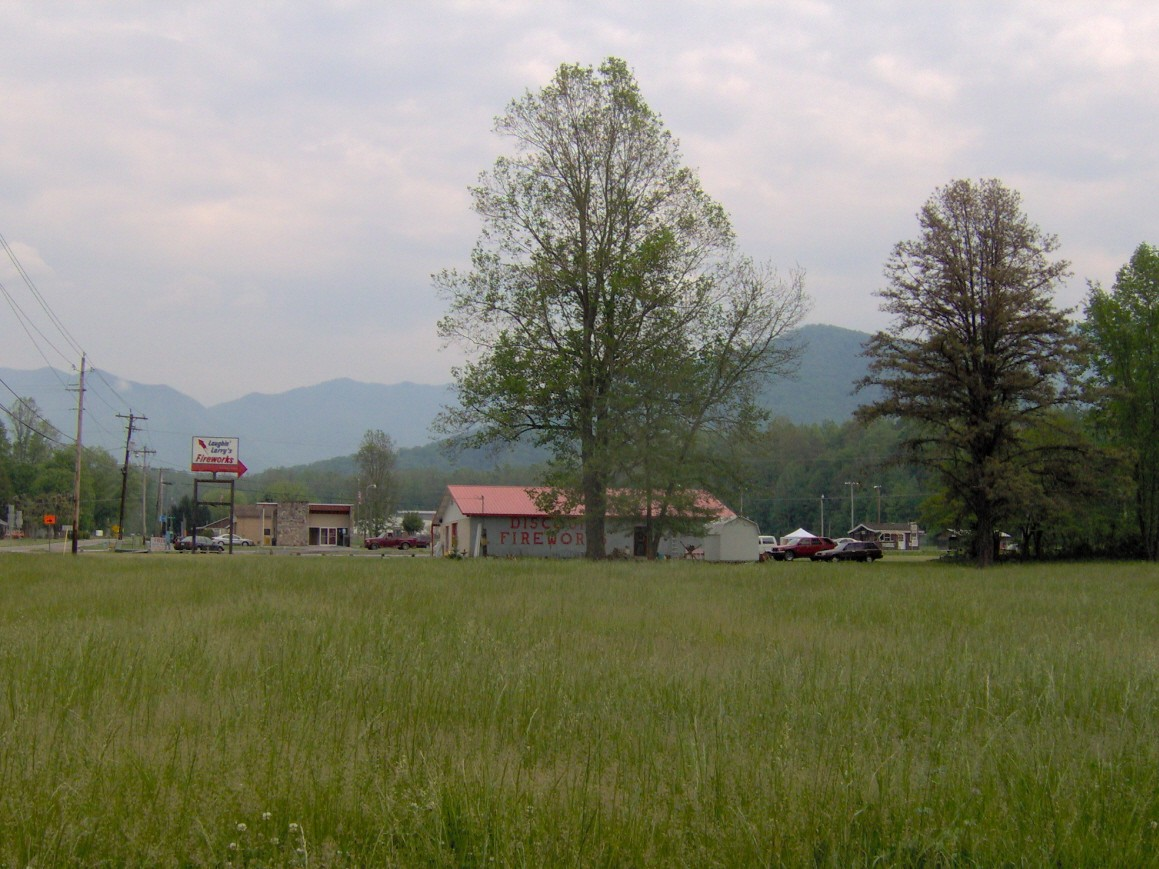
- Cosby area

- Location in Tennessee Location in the United States
- Coordinates: 35°47′42″N 83°14′44″W
- Country: United States
- State: Tennessee
- County: Cocke

Area
  - Total: 5.53 sq mi (14.33 km^{2})
  - Land: 5.53 sq mi (14.33 km^{2})
  - Water: 0 sq mi (0.00 km^{2})
- Elevation: 1,723 ft (525 m)

Population (2020)
  - Total: 807
  - Density: 145.8/sq mi (56.31/km^{2})
- Time zone: UTC-5 (Eastern (EST))
  - Summer (DST): UTC-4 (EDT)
- ZIP codes: 37722
- FIPS code: 47-17300
- GNIS feature ID: 2813075

Cosby is a census-designated place (CDP) and unincorporated community in Cocke County in the U.S. state of Tennessee. The population of the Cosby CDP according to the 2020 census was 807. The community has given its name to the northeastern section of the Great Smoky Mountains National Park, which forms its southern boundary. Cosby's zip code also extends to into Sevier County, and borders the town of Pittman Center.

== Demographics ==
Historical population
| Census | Pop. | Note | %± |
|---|---|---|---|
| 2020 | 807 | | — |
U.S. Decennial Census

As of the 2000 census, 5,201 people, 2,091 households, and 1,525 families resided in the zip code tabulation area for the zip code (37722) that serves Cosby and a large surrounding area of rural land. The racial makeup of this area was 98.8% White, 1.0% Native American, 0.2% Asian, and 0.2% African American. Hispanics and Latinos of any race comprised 0.9% of the population.

Of the 2,091 households, 31.3% had children under 18 living with them, 56.8% were married couples living together, 11.9% had a female householder with no husband present, and 27.1% were not families. About 22.1% of all households were made up of individuals, and 21.8% had someone living alone who was 65 or older. The average household size was 2.49 and the average family size was 2.89. About 76.2% of the population was 18 or older, and 14.4% was 62 or older. The median age was 38.1 years. The population was 48.1% male and 51.9% female.

The median income for a household in the area was $26,533, and for a family was $30,444. The per capita income for the city was $12,992. About 9.2% of families and 12.4% of the population were below the poverty line.

== Geography ==
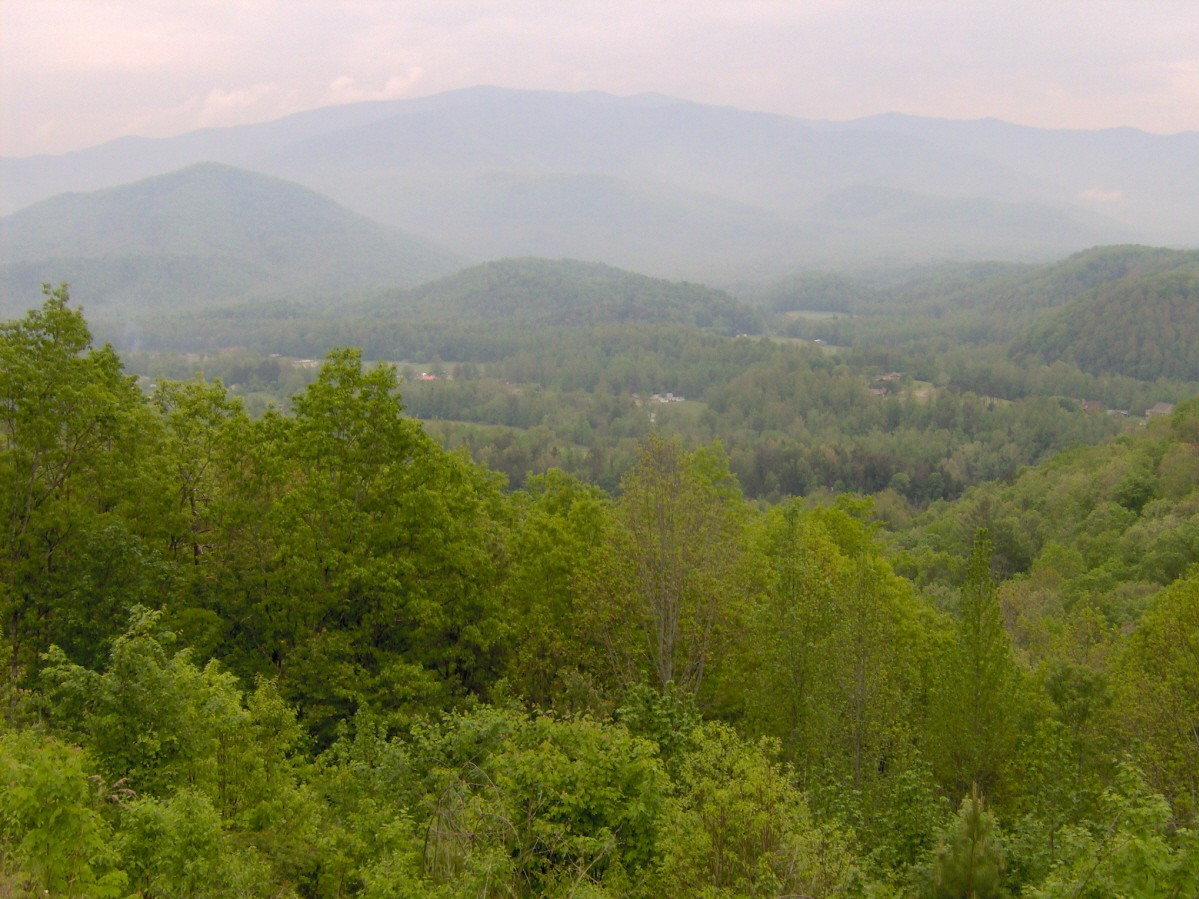
The Cosby Creek Valley, looking southwest from Foothills Parkway (Green Mountain)

Cosby is located on the northeast fringe of the Great Smoky Mountains. The community is spread out over a narrow valley that runs from Allen Grove near Newport in the north to the border of the national park to the south. English Mountain rises over 2,000 feet above Cosby to the northwest and Green Mountain rises just over 1,500 feet to the east. The Great Smoky Mountain National Park to the south and southwest forms several segments of the boundary of the community.

Cosby Creek, its source on the crest of the Smokies near Cammerer Ridge, is the valley's main watershed. The creek cuts through the valley, running roughly parallel to Tennessee Route 32/U.S. Route 321 before turning east near Allen Grove and emptying into the Pigeon River.

Traditionally, Cosby has been divided into three sections of differing elevation, known simply as Lower Cosby, Middle Cosby, and Upper Cosby. Lower Cosby is the northernmost section, roughly consisting of the area between the mouth of Cosby Creek along the Pigeon River and Jones Cove Road. Upper Cosby, most of which is now part of the national park, consists mainly of the area in the vicinity of the Cosby Campground.

U.S. Route 321 is the main road in Cosby, connecting the valley to Newport (10 miles to the north) and Gatlinburg (20 miles to the west). TN-339, which intersects US-321 near the center of Cosby, connects the valley with Jones Cove and Sevierville to the west. The easternmost segment of the Foothills Parkway intersects with U.S. Route 321 one-quarter mile further south. TN-32 parallels US-321 through most of Cosby before splitting off and heading east to the Cosby section of the national park and onward to the Tennessee-North Carolina border.

== History ==
=== Early history ===
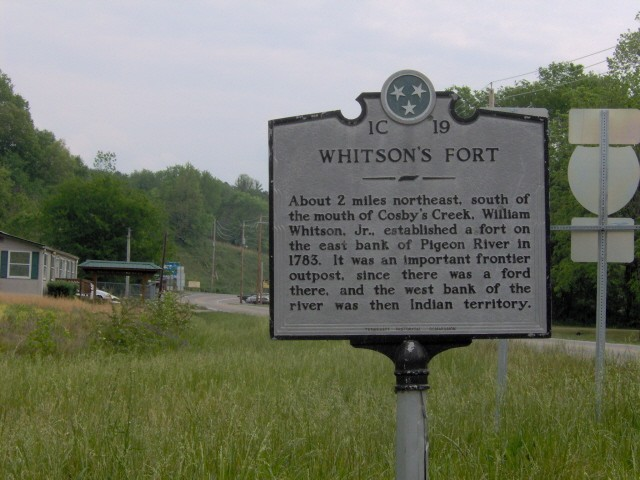
Historical marker recalling the site of Whitson's Fort

For centuries, lands along the northern rim of the Great Smokies, including Cosby, were used primarily as hunting grounds by the Cherokee. The first European settlers arrived in what is now Cocke County in the early 1780s. Among these settlers were John Gilliland (c. 1725-1798), who settled near the mouth of the Pigeon River, Peter Fine (1753–1826), who established Fine's Ferry at what is now Newport, and a small colony of German immigrants from Pennsylvania, who settled in what became known as the Dutch Bottoms area. Samuel Odell (c. 1750-1789) was probably the first to settle in the Cosby Creek valley.

These early encroachments no doubt reduced wildlife numbers and agitated the Cherokee, who harassed the early settlers by harvesting from their livestock. Fine's brother, Vinet, was killed while chasing a band of Cherokee in 1783. Scalpings were also reported. In response to these attacks, William Whitson (c. 1740/41-1819) erected a small fort just south of where Cosby Creek empties into the Pigeon River. The fort quickly grew into a small frontier outpost, complementing the fords and ferry to the north. While Cherokee raids continued, the Cosby area was largely peaceful by the early 19th century.

=== 19th century ===
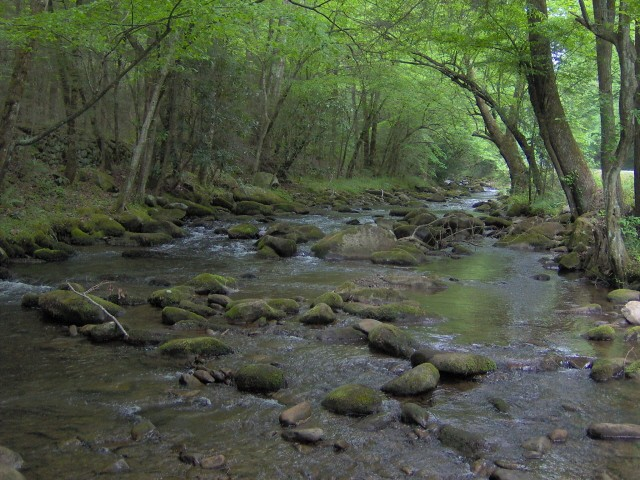
Cosby Creek

The origin of the name "Cosby" is a mystery, although two well-established hypotheses are given. The first centers around an early trapper and distiller in the area named Jonathan Cosby (sometimes spelled "Cozby"). The second suggests that the creek and valley were named after Dr. James Cozby (c. 1752-1831), a Revolutionary War veteran and friend of John Sevier, who may have made early claims to land along the creek. In any case, the name appears as early as 1838 in the minutes of the Big Pigeon Church in reference to the Bethany Church that had recently been founded along "Cosby Creek".

Cocke County, like much of East Tennessee, was divided between Union and Confederate sentiments during the American Civil War. Like most mountain communities, Cosby was subject to raids throughout the war, especially from Confederate marauders crossing the mountains from North Carolina. A "home guard" camp was eventually established at the mouth of Indian Camp creek.

In the late 19th century, Cosby slowly recovered from the effects of the war. The community benefited to some extent from the railroad stations established at Newport and Big Creek in 1867 and the 1870s, respectively. In the 1890s, a lumber mill was established at nearby Hartford, adjacent to the Tennessee-North Carolina border.

=== Early 20th century ===
By 1900, most Cosby residents were either farmers or worked in lumber mills. Some residents supplemented their income by gathering ginseng, evergreens, and moss in the mountains, and some distilled corn liquor. Religion was still of utmost importance.

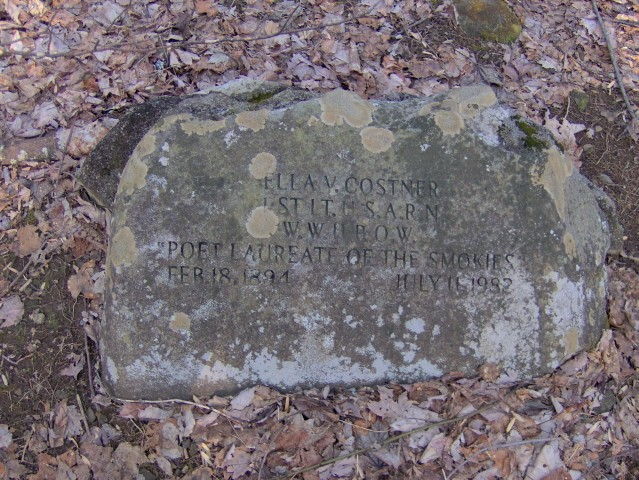
The grave of Ella Costner, former Cosby resident and Poet Laureate of the Smokies, near Cosby Campground

Most church services were held once every month, usually in framed buildings. Mary Bell Smith, who grew up in Cosby in the 1920s, remembered:

Sermons were long and harrowing. In vivid language, the preacher painted Heaven and Hell, with considerably more emphasis on Hell than upon Heaven. I mentally pictured the Devil as a monstrous red animal with horns and a long tail, who carried a four-pronged pitchfork. For some reason, I believed he lived in the ground and could appear at will. The church had no organ or piano, so we sang without instruments.

With the construction of railroads between Newport and Hartford, the Progressive Era began to make its way to the Smokies. Electricity had arrived in the sawmill towns in the 1920s. Still, Cosby lagged behind. Although the Baptist Church Organization established Cosby Academy in 1913, most of Cosby's children received brief instruction in rudimentary schoolhouses. Mary Bell Smith recalled:

The one-room school building was only about thirty by fifty feet and rested on stone pillars about four feet off the ground at the front entrance. Inside a chalk-board stretched across the back wall, and a pot-bellied stove stood near the center of the room. A water bucket, a tin dipper, six erasers, and a broom completed the educational supplies.

With the arrival of the Great Depression, many of the sawmills, including the Boice Hardwood mill at Hartford, shut down. Most farmers had difficulty selling their crops, and some were forced to turn to moonshining (see below). Many of the mountain people survived the Depression due to their hunting skills. Smith remembered her father waking up before sunrise and "returning with several squirrels" for the family breakfast. The pains of the Depression were eased when the Civilian Conservation Corps established a camp at what is now Cosby Creek Campground to construct trails for the newly created Great Smoky Mountains National Park, and the TVA began work on Douglas Dam on the other side of English Mountain.

Unlike many other Smoky Mountain communities, such as Cades Cove and the Sugarlands, only part of Cosby was incorporated into the national park. Many farmers were indeed glad to sell their land, but according to Mary Bell Smith:

The day was mournful for many families when the government bought the Great Smoky Mountains and created a national park. Our friends and acquaintances who had lived there for generations had to find new homes and a new way of life.

=== Moonshining ===
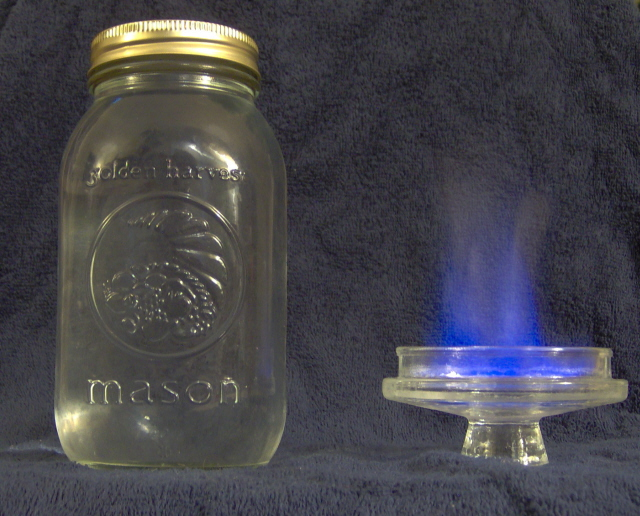
Appalachian moonshine

For much of the first half of the 20th century, Cosby was known to East Tennesseans as "The Moonshine Capital of the World." Of Cosby's moonshiners, Smith recalled:

So notorious did their activities become that I learned when I first went away from home that when I had to give my address as "Cosby," I should be ready to say, "Yes, they make it up there."

Like other Appalachian communities at the base of the Smokies, Cosby's chief crop was corn. While corn could be grown on relatively steep grades, the soil in Cosby's hilly recesses grew poorer and poorer with every clearing. Eventually, farmers struggled to break even, and in the late 19th century began to supplement their income by selling moonshine.

The deep winding coves and thick forests of the Smokies were the perfect cover for moonshine stills. As liquor supplies were strained with the rise of prohibition in the early 20th century, demand for the mountaineers' moonshine grew steadily. While many mountain communities were difficult to access, Cosby was connected by road to Newport and Knoxville, giving it an early advantage. Furthermore, Cosby never managed to attract the tourism dollars that spilled into other park border towns, such as Gatlinburg and Townsend. It is therefore no surprise that moonshining became such an issue in the Cosby valley.

During World War II, the Manhattan Project at what is now Oak Ridge brought in people from all over the country. As many were unaccustomed to the dry laws that were prevalent in Tennessee at the time, they bought illegally distilled liquor. This pushed the demand in Cosby still higher. Cosby's moonshiners dealt with the sugar shortage brought about by the war by taking advantage of a government supplement of sugar to any farmer who kept beehives. According to Appalachian historian Wilma Dykeman, "beehives sprouted around mountain cabins like weeds in a seedbed."

The explosion of moonshining in the Cosby area would lead to a cat-and-mouse game between law enforcement and moonshiners. The illegal distillers would warn one another of approaching revenue agents by setting off dynamite. Other times, locals would drive behind agents' cars, leading to a long tailgate along the road through the valley. Revenue officials could not rely on the residents of Cosby, who shunned intrusion by outside law enforcement. Moonshiners devised various methods for avoiding detection. Smith recalls:

On my walks to the country store, I have stood barefoot, watching as the hauler carefully brushed away his tire tracks with pine boughs. Moonshine stills were well concealed within the dark recesses of the mountains, but the smoke still wafted skyward from points all over the green mountains. Not so easily concealed were the odor of the mash fermenting and the whump, whump, whump of the thump keg. On a rare occasion I saw a still in full operation on Sunday in sight of Caton's Grove Church.

Eventually, competition between moonshiners led some to inform on others. Violence often erupted between rival families. The practice of illegally distilling liquor largely declined with the demise of dry laws in various counties around East Tennessee. While most residents of Cosby were no doubt law-abiding citizens, the notoriety the town gained as a moonshine mecca still hangs over it today.

=== Modern day ===
In 2020, the United States Census Bureau designated Cosby as a census-designated place.

== Economy ==
Cosby's economy is fueled by the Great Smoky Mountains National Park and the Foothills Parkway. Known for its small, mountain town like culture and environment, Cosby has multiple motels, cabins, and country-style restaurants.

== Education ==
The Cosby community is served by the Cocke County Schools System and the Sevier County Schools System.

Cocke County Schools:

- Cosby Elementary School – Grades K-8, the elementary school is connected to the high school and has the same address, and share some of the same buildings and cafeteria.
- Cosby High School – Grades 9-12 and its mascot is the "Eagles."
- Smoky Mountain Elementary School – Grades PK–8

Sevier County Schools:

- Jones Cove Elementary School – Grades PK–8
- Pittman Center Elementary School – Grades PK–8
- Gatlinburg-Pittman High School – Grades 9–12

== Notable people ==
- Ken Arensbak, lithographer and artist
- Artie D. Valentine (1927-2020), member of Nevada Assembly 1956-1972
