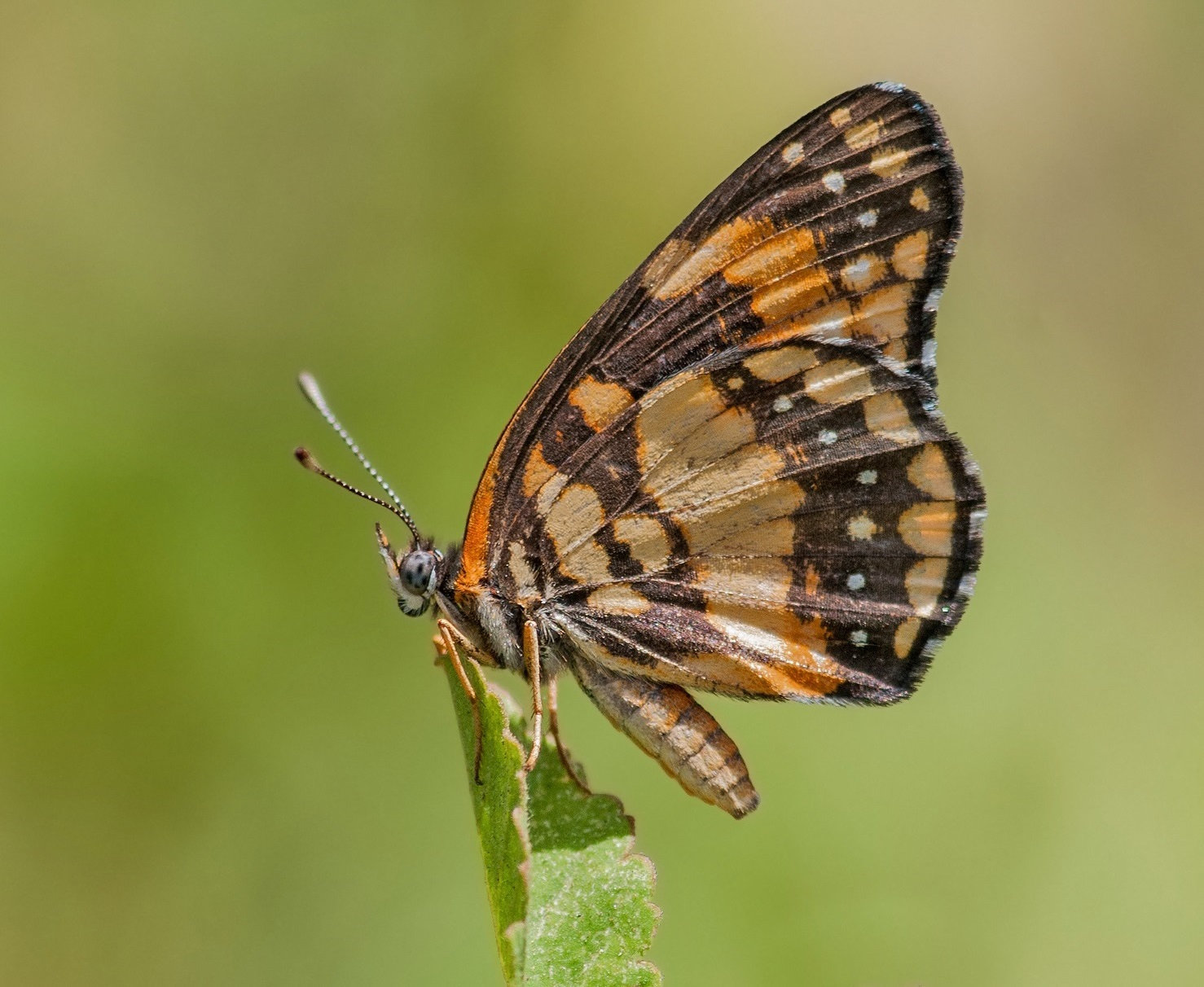

Scientific classification
- Kingdom: Animalia
- Phylum: Arthropoda
- Class: Insecta
- Order: Lepidoptera
- Family: Nymphalidae
- Genus: Chlosyne
- Species: C. lacinia

Binomial name
- Chlosyne lacinia (Geyer, 1837)

= Chlosyne lacinia =

Species of butterfly

Chlosyne lacinia, the bordered patch or sunflower patch, is a North and South American butterfly in the family Nymphalidae.

== Description ==
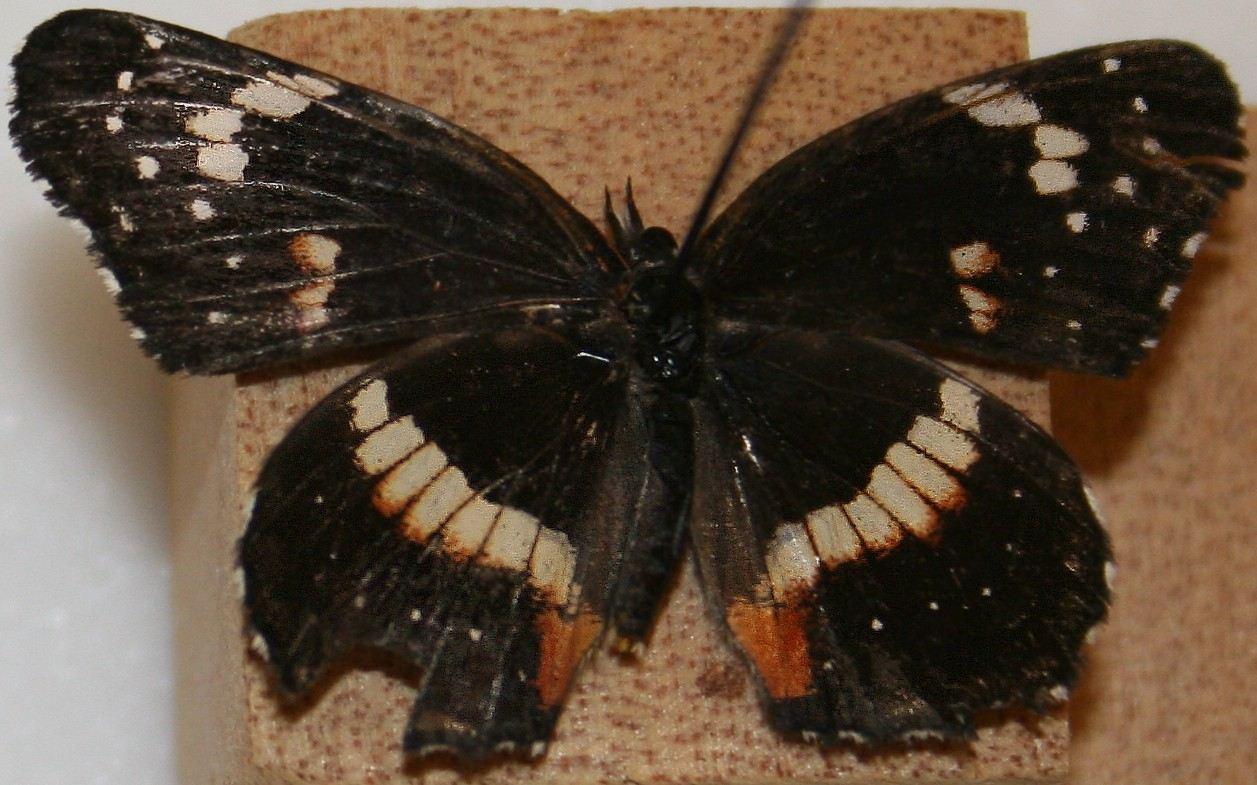
Upperside of wings

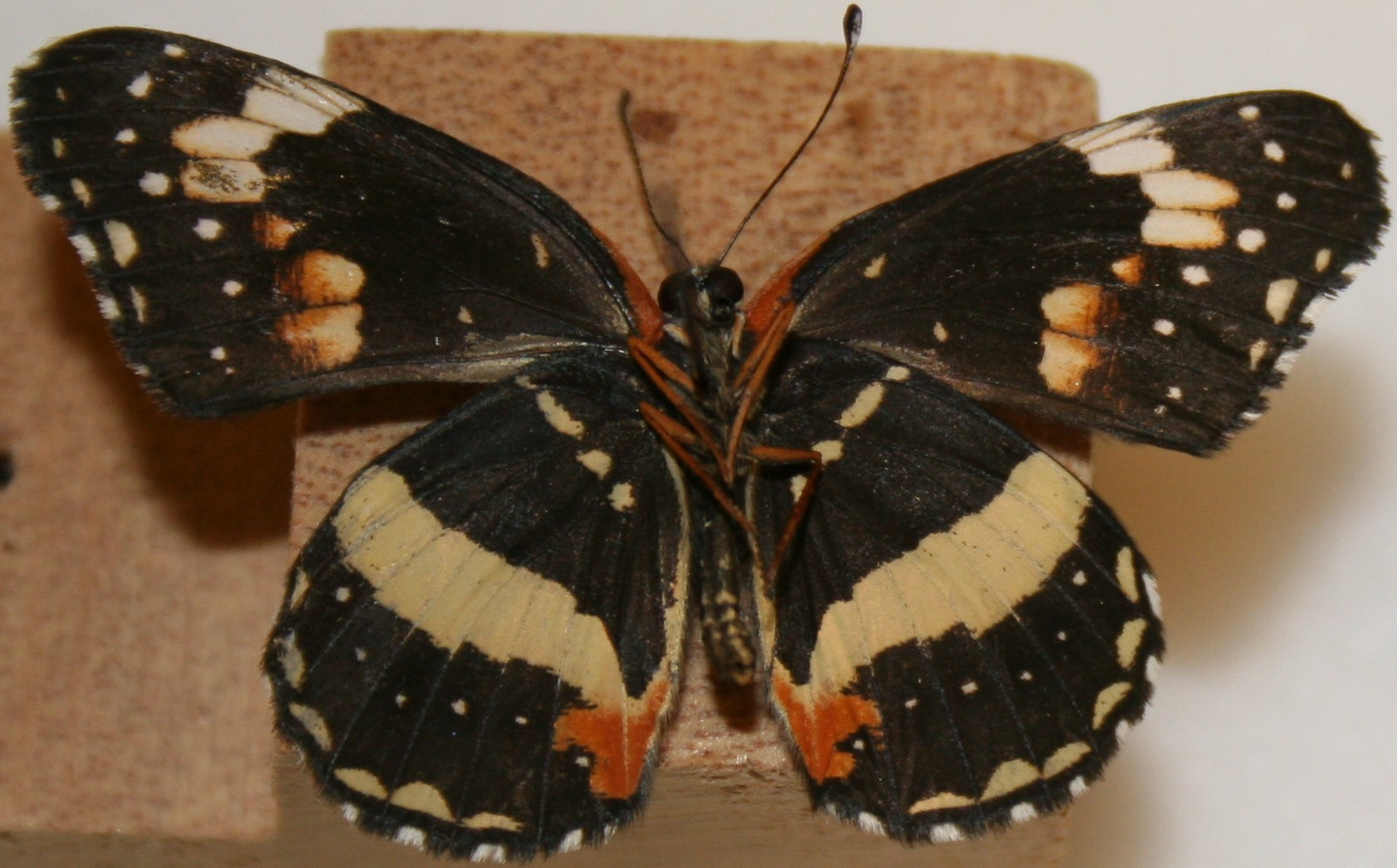
Underside of wings

The bordered patch is an extremely variable butterfly. The upperside of the wings is mainly black with the forewing having rows of white and/or yellow-orange spots of varying sizes. There is usually one whitish spot in the forewing cell. The hindwing has many color variations. Those variations can be: almost completely black to having some red postmedian spots to having a few rows of white postmedian spots to having an all red-orange discal area to having a yellow-orange postmedian band of varying width. The underside of the wings is just as variable as the upperside. It varies from having a few rows of white and red spots to having a yellow-white hindwing median band of varying width to the underside being mostly golden yellow with large yellow-orange spots and a thick golden-yellow median band. All of these variations have a red spot near the hindwing tornus. Its wingspan ranges from 1 1/4 to 1 7/8 inches (32 to 48 mm).

== Similar species ==
Similar species in the bordered patch's range include the crimson patch (Chlosyne janais), the rosita patch (Chlosyne rosita), and the red-spotted patch (Chlosyne marina).

The crimson patch is larger, the upperside of the forewing has two spots in the cell, and the underside of the hindwing has a yellow basal patch with black spots in it.

The upperside of the rosita patch's hindwing has a basal patch which is often two toned, and the underside of the hindwing is mostly pale yellow with a thick black marginal border.

The red-spotted patch has a row of red marginal spots on the upperside, and underside of the hindwing.

== Habitat ==
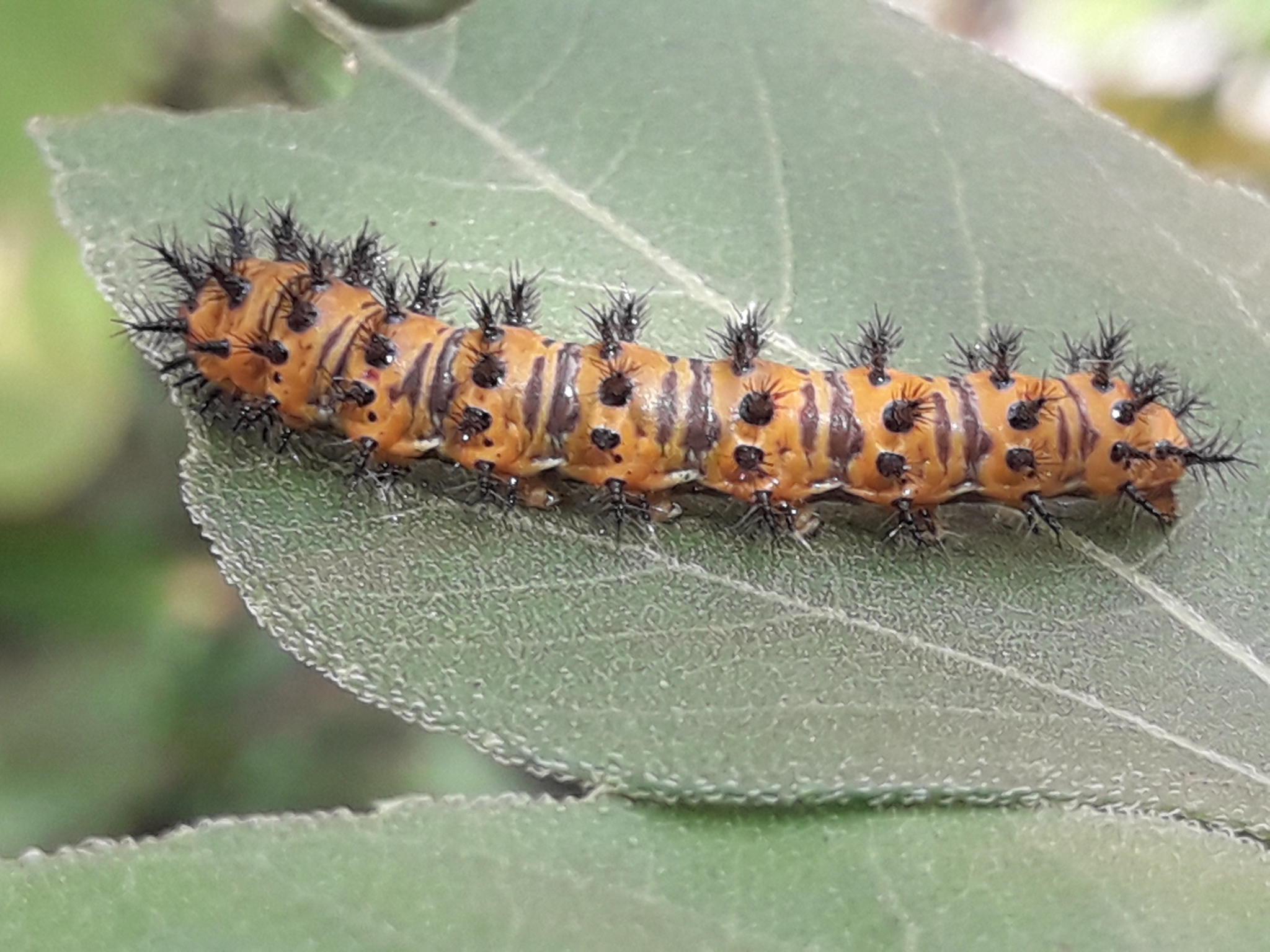
C. lacinia adjutrix larva.

The bordered patch may be encountered in habitats such as desert hills, mesquite woodlands, pinyon woodlands, and oak woodlands in the United States. In the US, this species prefers to inhabit agricultural areas and weedy wastelands where the preferred host plant Helianthus annuus occurs. In Belize, Costa Rica, Panama and other regions in Central America, this species as well as others in the genus, are often found in roadside verges, in the unmowed rows between citrus plantations, and other areas of disturbed ground where both nectar resources and larval hosts are provided by plant species in the Asteracae, Acanthaceae, and Amaranthaceae families.

== Flight ==
This species is found from May to October in California, late January to mid-November in Arizona, and all year in southern Texas.

== Life cycle ==
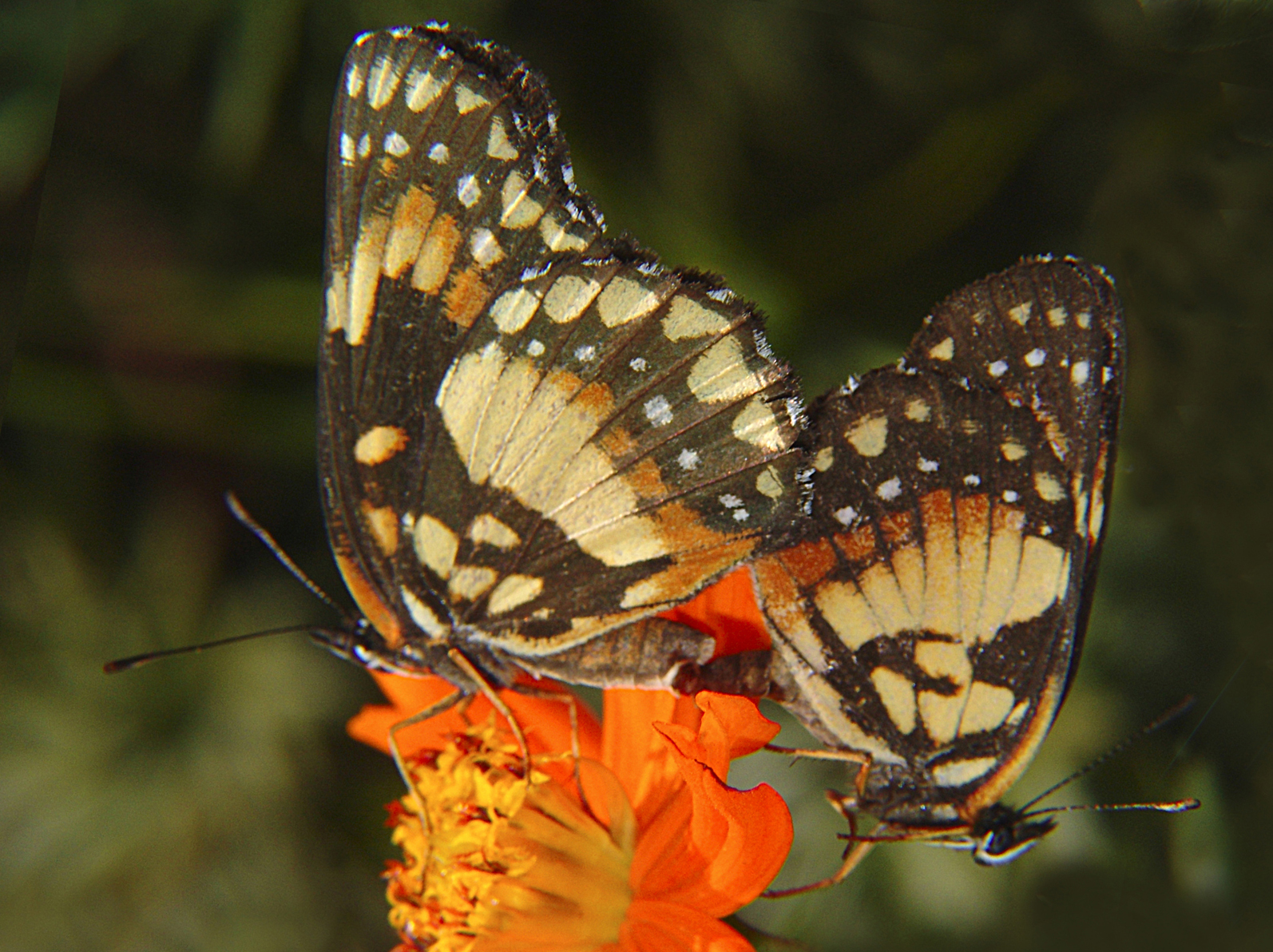
A mating pair of bordered patches

Males will find females by awaiting them on hilltops. Females will lay their eggs in clusters of about 100 or more on the underside of host plant leaves. The eggs are pale yellow green but later turn a reddish color. The young larvae feed together and but do not make a nest. They will become solitary when older. The larva is as variable as the adult. It ranges from mostly orange with black spines and stripes to black with a red-orange mid-dorsal stripe to almost all black. All variations have a red-orange head. The chrysalis varies from almost all white to white with black markings to nearly all black. The third instar larva hibernates and also estivates. The bordered patch has three or four broods per year.

== Host plants ==
Here is a list of host plants used by the bordered patch:

- Common ragweed, Ambrosia artemisiifolia
- Giant ragweed, Ambrosia trifida var. texana
- Baltimora species
- Straggler daisy, Calyptocarpus vialis
- bonesets, Eupatorium spies
- Indian blanketflower, Gaillardia pulchella
- Sunflower, Helianthus annuus
- Silverleaf sunflower, Helianthus argophyllus
- Texas blueweed, Helianthus ciliaris
- Cucumberleaf sunflower, Helianthus debilis
- Maximilian sunflower, Helianthus maximiliani
- Jerusalem artichoke, Helianthus tuberosus
- Camphor weed, Heterotheca latifolia
- Showy palafox, Palafoxia sphacelata
- Santa Maria feverfew, Parthenium hysterophorus
- Crown-beard, Verbesina encelioides
- Xanthium pennsylvanicum
- Orange zexmenia, Zexmenia hispida
