= Baltimore (disambiguation) =

Baltimore is the most populous city in the state of Maryland, in the United States.

Baltimore may also refer to:

== Places ==
=== Canada ===
- Baltimore, Ontario, Township of Hamilton, Ontario

=== Ireland ===
- Baltimore, County Cork
  - Baltimore (Parliament of Ireland constituency)
- Baltimore, County Longford, former manor around Drumlish

=== United States ===
- Baltimore Township, Henry County, Iowa
- Baltimore, Indiana, a ghost town of the 19th century
- Baltimore, Ohio, a suburb of Columbus
- Baltimore, Tennessee
- Baltimore, Vermont
- Baltimore County, Maryland
- Baltimore Hundred, an unincorporated subdivision of Sussex County, Delaware
- Baltimore Town, California, a former settlement
- Baltimore Township, Michigan
- Knights Landing, California, formerly called Baltimore

=== Russia ===
- Voronezh Malshevo (air base), also known as Baltimore air base

== People ==
- Baron Baltimore, a title (1625–1771) in the Peerage of Ireland
  - George Calvert, 1st Baron Baltimore (1579–1632), English politician and colonizer
  - Cecilius Calvert, 2nd Baron Baltimore (1605–1675), English peer
  - Charles Calvert, 3rd Baron Baltimore (1637–1715)
  - Benedict Calvert, 4th Baron Baltimore (1679–1715), English nobleman and politician
  - Charles Calvert, 5th Baron Baltimore (1699–1751), British nobleman
  - Frederick Calvert, 6th Baron Baltimore (1731–1771), English nobleman and last in the line of Barons Baltimore
- David Baltimore (1938–2025), American biologist and 1975 Nobel Prize laureate
- Charli Baltimore (born 1974), American rapper/hip-hop artist
- Sandy Baltimore (born 2000), French professional footballer

== Arts, entertainment, and media ==
=== Music ===
- Baltimore (album), by Nina Simone (1978)
- Baltimore club, a genre of house and dance music

==== Songs ====
- "Baltimore" (Tori Amos song)
- "Baltimore", a song by Randy Newman, from his album Little Criminals, covered by Nina Simone and others
- "Baltimore", a song by Prince, from his album Hit n Run Phase Two
- "Baltimore", a song by The Extra Glenns from Martial Arts Weekend
- "Baltimore", a song by Stephen Malkmus on Real Emotional Trash

=== Other media ===
- Baltimore (film), a 2023 film starring Imogen Poots
- Baltimore (novel and comic series), by Mike Mignola and Christopher Golden
  - Baltimore, or The Steadfast Tin Soldier and the Vampire, a 2007 illustrated novel
- Baltimore (magazine), a monthly city magazine
- "Baltimore" (NCIS), a television episode

== Sports ==
- Baltimore Bullets (1944–1954), a former professional basketball team
- Baltimore Bullets, a 1963-1973 revival of the name for the professional basketball team that is now the Washington Wizards
- Baltimore Orioles, Major League Baseball team based in Baltimore, Maryland
- Baltimore Ravens, American football team based in Baltimore, Maryland
- Baltimore Stallions, former Canadian Football team based in Baltimore, Maryland

== Transportation ==
- Baltimore Clipper, a type of fast sailing vessel built in the late 18th and early 19th century
- Baltimore (tug), a steam-powered tugboat
- Baltimore and Ohio Railroad, reporting marks B&O, and BO
- HMS Baltimore (1742), Royal Navy sloop-of-war
- Martin Baltimore (A-30), attack/bomber aircraft
- USCS Baltimore, a United States Coast Survey schooner in service from 1851 to 1858
- USS Baltimore, several United States Navy ships

== Other uses ==
- Baltimore classification, system used to classify viruses, named for biologist David Baltimore
- Baltimore Technologies, a former "dot-com darling" information security firm, now defunct

== See also ==
- Baltimora (disambiguation)
- Lord Baltimore (disambiguation)
- New Baltimore (disambiguation)
