= Baltimora (disambiguation) =

Baltimora was an Italian music project, active from 1984 to 1987.

Baltimora may also refer to:

- Baltimora (plant), genus of flowering plants in the sunflower family.
- Baltimora (singer), an Italian singer-songwriter and record producer

== See also ==
- Baltimore (disambiguation)
