= Blueweed =

Blueweed or blue weed is a common name for several plants and may refer to:

- Chicory, Cichorium intybus
- Echium vulgare, native to Europe and western and central Asia
- Helianthus ciliaris
