= Allen Grove =

Allen Grove or Allen's Grove may refer to:

- Allen Grove (Alabama), a plantation in the US
- Allen Grove, Tennessee, an unincorporated community in the US
- Allen's Grove, Wisconsin, an unincorporated community in the US
- Allen Grove, Gauteng, a populated place in South Africa
- Allens Grove Township, Mason County, Illinois, US
- Allens Grove Township, Scott County, Iowa, US
