= Lady Baltimore =

Lady Baltimore may refer to:

- Anne Arundell, Lady Baltimore (c. 1615/1616–1649) English noblewoman
- Charlotte Lee, Lady Baltimore (1678–1721) English noblewoman
- Lady Baltimore cake, an American white layer cake
- Lady Baltimore (eagle), a non-releasable bald eagle
- Lady Baltimore, a 1906 novel by Owen Wister

== See also ==
- Lord Baltimore (disambiguation)
