= List of killings by law enforcement officers in the United States, May 2023 =

This is a list of people reported killed by non-military law enforcement officers in the United States in May 2023, whether in the line of duty or not, and regardless of reason or method. The listing documents the occurrence of a death, making no implications regarding wrongdoing or justification on the part of the person killed or officer involved. Killings are arranged by date of the incident that caused death. Different death dates, if known, are noted in the description. The table below lists 86 people.

== May 2023 ==
| Date | Name (age) of deceased | Race | Location | Description |
|---|---|---|---|---|
| 2023-05-31 | unidentified adult male | | Salinas, California | For unknown reasons, the male was shot and killed during or after a 10-hour standoff. |
| 2023-05-31 | Dimitri Alex Klimov (27) | White | Philadelphia, Pennsylvania | Klimov was shot and killed in his own Kensington home, by three Philadelphia Police officers during a struggle, after four heavily armed officers led by Sgt. Sean Spicer forced entry into the residence on Ruth Street, having apparently misjudged the circumstances of an incident that had just taken place outside on the same block of Ruth Street. The fourth officer present was shot in the hand by "friendly fire". Though an internal investigation, as well as independent investigation by the city AG, were subsequently launched - following PAPD and city protocol guidelines, no further information from these sources has surfaced, for over a year. Several critical details regarding the police shooting and its aftermath, were never released to the public via available news and information outlets. |
| 2023-05-31 | unidentified adult male | | Denton, North Carolina | The male was killed when he exchanged shots deputies "on and on" for several hours. A deputy was injured. |
| 2023-05-31 | Daniel Mooneyham (47) | White | Phenix City, Alabama | A male, who was wanted for shooting at utility workers, was shot by deputies when he allegedly pointed a gun at them. |
| 2023-05-30 | Jared Daniel Rudderham (36) | White | Pinellas Park, Florida | Pinellas Park Police Department responded to a domestic violence at a residence. While officers were talking to a female, an officer witnessed Rudderham walking along the property line. When officers approached him, Rudderham allegedly pulled a Glock from his waistband. Officer Cameron Williams then shot Rudderham. Rudderham died at a hospital. |
| 2023-05-30 | Dylan Wilson (29) | White | Sparks, Nevada | Police responded to reports of a man threatening a woman at the Iron Horse Shopping Center. When they arrived, the male first ran, then stopped and allegedly pulled at a knife and charged at the officers. |
| 2023-05-30 | Joshua James Wilson (43) | White | Vancouver, Washington | A local man was shot by three Vancouver police officers and Clark County deputy in the parking lot of a Safeway after he pulled out a firearm and fired shots at them. The male was wanted for numerous armed robberies. |
| 2023-05-29 | Freddie Edwards (58) | | Landrum, South Carolina | Officers shot and killed Edwards after he allegedly didn't follow orders to drop a butcher's knife. Nearby, a female was also found deceased in a wheelchair. |
| 2023-05-28 | James Matthew Hooten (46) | White | Kennett, Missouri | Hooten was slain by a Missouri State Highway Patrol officer after a physical altercation. |
| 2023-05-27 | Jeremy Haugabook (36) | Black | Lithonia, Georgia | An officer shot Haugabook after he allegedly pointed a weapon in the officer's direction. Haugabook was possibly going through mental health crisis. |
| 2023-05-27 | Arturo Fuentes (42) | Latino | San Antonio, Texas | An SAPD and probationary officer shot and killed a man after he allegedly pointed a firearm at them. |
| 2023-05-27 | Ruben Ramos (47) | Latino | Burbank, California | A Los Angeles man was shot a parking lot of a Home Depot. Authorities confirmed that he threatened to shoot people at the store before his death. |
| 2023-05-26 | Alex R. Naone (26) | White | Manchester, New Hampshire | Naone, of Hooksett, New Hampshire, was shot and killed after police encountered him. He was shot in his abdomen and chest. Naone was allegedly armed. |
| 2023-05-25 | Christopher Swanger (36) | | Boulder, Colorado | A woman called 911 when she found out that Swanger was coming to her home, and later replying that Swanger carried a gun. Hours later, Swanger arrived showed up and a confrontation ensured. Swanger was shot by two officers when he allegedly pulled out a gun. |
| 2023-05-25 | Jose Angel Cruz (38) | Hispanic | Mission, Texas | During a pursuit, the male crashed and was shot by police when he allegedly pointed a firearm at them. The male was wanted for shooting and injuring his wife. |
| 2023-05-25 | Asia Fitzgerald (25) | | Tallahassee, Florida | Police shot Fitzgerald after she shot at them with a rifle. |
| 2023-05-25 | James Phillip White Jr. (48) | White | Kernersville, North Carolina | Deputies found White sleeping in his car. When they made contact with him, he woke up and drove away to his home. Deputies followed White and he ran from them, and at some point, later allegedly assaulted the deputy. White barricaded himself inside the residence and a hostage situation ensured. Eventually, deputies entered the residence when White allegedly tried to attack them with a sledgehammer. A deputy then shot White. |
| 2023-05-24 | Shari Vincent (44) | | Oklahoma City, Oklahoma | Shortly after a pursuit, Vincent was shot by a U.S. Marshal after she allegedly produced a gun. |
| 2023-05-24 | Scott MacDonald (55) | White | Des Plaines, Illinois | Scott, who was mentally disturbed, was shot in a hallway at an apartment building when he came at an officer with an axe. |
| 2023-05-24 | James Moriarty (38) | White | Geneva, Illinois | A man from Aurora, Illinois died during a shootout with Kane County Sheriff deputies in Geneva. A K9 also died during the incident. |
| 2023-05-24 | James Harrison (52) | White | Cranston, Rhode Island | After colliding with a rock during a chase, police shot Harrison when he allegedly got out of his vehicle with a firearm. Harrison was wanted for shooting three people, killing 83-year-old Janet Harrison, 44-year-old Thomas May & wounding a 15-year-old girl in his hometown of Johnston. |
| 2023-05-23 | Lonnie Hendon (68) | White | Columbia, Mississippi | Hendon pulled into his driveway while deputies were attempting to contact with him at his house. Deputies approached Hendon and told him that he had numerous arrest warrants. Hendon allegedly refused to go with them and was shot when he retrieved a handgun from a seat in his vehicle. |
| 2023-05-23 | Whitney Leanne Fox (36) | White | Bybee, Tennessee | Fox was shot after a pursuit. |
| 2023-05-23 | Enrique Ponce Martinez (53) | Latino | Donna, Texas | Martinez was shot multiple times when he allegedly tried to run over deputies & his estranged wife with his pickup truck. At the time of his death, Martinez was on a protective order, because he previously assaulted his estranged wife. |
| 2023-05-23 | Treyvorius Stodghill (23) | Black | Covington, Georgia | Stodghill died after he exchanged gunfire with an officer at a hotel. The officer was injured after being shot in the head. |
| 2023-05-23 | Anthony Zaremski (23) | White | Clifton Park, New York | Zaremski, a Colonie, New York resident, died hours later at a hospital after he was shot during a shootout at his apartment complex (which was the target of a federal search warrant). Zaremski managed to shoot and injure two deputies before he was shot. |
| 2023-05-22 | Michael Craddock (32) | White | Cincinnati, Ohio | Craddock was shot and killed by a SWAT after he came out his house and allegedly aimed a firearm at officers. Craddock was a suspect in a robbery at a Fifth Third Bank. |
| 2023-05-22 | Bradley Frank Begens (63) | White | Sebring, Florida | Begens was shot by a deputy when he allegedly aimed a firearm at them during a search warrant. Begens was a sex offender who was convicted of attempted sexual battery on a child under 12 years of age. |
| 2023-05-22 | Timothy Burgess (38) | Black | Racine, Wisconsin | Burgess was pulled over by officers in connection to a shots fired report. Burgess exited his vehicle and ran to a wooded area. When officers approached Burgess, he allegedly started shooting at them. Burgess was killed when officers returned fire. |
| 2023-05-21 | unidentified adult male | | Trinidad, Colorado | Officers were called to a trailer about reports of a man who allegedly had warrants. When officers arrived, they reported hearing voices from a trailer and knocked on the door. When officers looked inside a window, they saw a male moving around. Officers took cover when they heard multiple gunshots shots being fired. Officers fired at the male as he ran from the trailer toward the house. Officers fired additional shots at the male when he allegedly didn't follow commands to show his hands, or to drop the gun. |
| 2023-05-19 | unidentified adult male | | Carson City, Nevada | For reasons unclear, the male was slain by a tribal officer during a welfare check. |
| 2023-05-19 | Zachry Seward (31) | White | Lincoln, Arkansas | Seward was slain by officers of the Western Arkansas Fugitive Task Force who were attempting to serve a search warrant. Seward was to have allegedly emerged from house shooting at officers before officers returned fire. |
| 2023-05-19 | Tomas Ramirez-Martinez (42) | | Guadalupe, Arizona | At around 9:40 p.m., deputies were called to reports of a person with a gun. When they arrived, deputies encountered Martinez. For unknown reasons, Martinez was shot and killed. |
| 2023-05-19 | unidentified adult male | | San Francisco, California | The man was shot after he allegedly reached for a gun during a standoff. |
| 2023-05-19 | Zonchez Prince (39) | Black | Orange Park, Florida | Prince was shot by a SWAT officers after he allegedly pulled out a firearm. Prince and his brother were suspects in the homicide of 32-year-old Andrew Ford in Pompano Beach, Florida. |
| 2023-05-19 | unidentified adult male | | Albuquerque, New Mexico | The male was killed when he lunged at officers with a "spear-type weapon with a knife onto the front of a pole". Earlier that day, the male changed his Facebook profile picture to read "Professional Killer". |
| 2023-05-18 | Tyrone Payne (40) | Black | Kansas City, Missouri | Police were called after witnesses reported seeing Payne drag a woman into a home. When officers arrived, Payne fired shots from inside the home at officers, who shot back. A SWAT team was called and a standoff began. At some point, Payne emerged from the house with a firearm & was killed in a shootout. |
| 2023-05-18 | Raymond Mattia | Native American | Ajo, Arizona | Mattia was slain by Border Patrol agents after reporting that a migrant was trespassing on his property. |
| 2023-05-18 | unidentified adult male | | Bastrop, Louisiana | Circumstances of the killing are unknown. |
| 2023-05-18 | Cody Mercer (30) | | Biloxi, Mississippi | Mercer was shot multiple times by a female Harrison County Board of Supervisors Safety Patrol Officer, not a Police officer. There was no hit and run. She lied about that. you can reference the article on Sun Herald or Yahoo news stating NEW DETAILS EMERGE.https://news.yahoo.com/details-emerge-fatal-shooting-involving-215339623.html |
| 2023-05-17 | Pietro Lalicata (86) | | Mequon, Wisconsin | Officers were called to the scene around 3:30 PM after getting reports of a neighbor dispute involving a firearm. When the officers arrived, Lalicata barricaded himself inside a home. When Lalicata emerged from the house, a shootout ensured and Lalicata was killed. |
| 2023-05-17 | unidentified adult male | | Shawnee, Oklahoma | The male was shot dead after he pointed a firearm at officers. The male had been pointing a firearm random vehicles before officers arrived. |
| 2023-05-17 | Robert Nash (40) | Unknown | Point Hope, Alaska | Troopers shot and killed Nash, who was reported for shooting at buildings and people with a rifle, after he allegedly pointed the gun at them. |
| 2023-05-16 | unidentified adult male | | Meridian, Mississippi | The male was threatening people at an assisted care facility with a handgun. The male barricaded himself inside a room. Police shot and killed the male when he allegedly advanced towards officers with a weapon. |
| 2023-05-15 | Beau Wilson (18) | White | Farmington, New Mexico | Wilson shot and killed three people and wounded several others before he was slain by police. |
| 2023-05-15 | John McKinzie Jr (27) | Black | West Palm Beach, Florida | An officer shot and killed McKinzie outside his apartment that he shared with his girlfriend. McKinzie's family says he was in a middle of a diabetic episode when he was shot. |
| 2023-05-13 | Michael Adams (76) | | Senoia, Georgia | Adams shot and wounded his wife. When police got to the scene, they encountered Adams with a gun. Police tried to convince Adams to put the gun down but he pointed the gun at officers. He was then shot dead. |
| 2023-05-13 | unidentified adult male | | Fort Worth, Texas | |
| 2023-05-13 | unidentified adult male (65) | | Houston, Texas | |
| 2023-05-12 | unidentified adult male | | Canute, Oklahoma | |
| 2023-05-12 | David Wright (63) | | Sevierville, Tennessee | |
| 2023-05-12 | unidentified adult male | | Irving, Texas | |
| 2023-05-11 | Robert Joseph Layton (83) | | Kissimmee, Florida | Shot after pointing a gun at officers. |
| 2023-05-11 | Brandon Lemagne (38) | Black | Fairfax County, Virginia | Lemagne was shot and killed outside a McDonald's restaurant when he assaulted an officer. |
| 2023-05-11 | Justin Roberts (30) | Black | Denham Springs, Louisiana | Died from gunshot wounds after a shootout with an officer at Denham Springs shopping center. |
| 2023-05-10 | Albert Rafael Acosta (23) | | Cameron, Texas | Died from gunshot wounds after a shootout with officer Joshua Lee Clouse. Acosta had just shot his spouse in the neck. |
| 2023-05-09 | Brandon Griffin (23) | White | Mount Vernon, Illinois | Died during a shootout with an Illinois state trooper. |
| 2023-05-08 | Matthew Guffey | White | Okmulgee, Oklahoma | Circumstances are unknown. |
| 2023-05-08 | unidentified adult male (30) | White | High Point, North Carolina | The 30-year-old man was shot and killed when he came to his door with a rifle. |
| 2023-05-08 | Kyle Bozeman III (49) | Black | Detroit, Michigan | Bozeman was shot and killed by Southfield police officers after he attempted to reach for an assault rifle. Bozeman had just shot and killed his 41-year-old ex-girlfriend and wounded her current boyfriend at a hotel. |
| 2023-05-08 | unidentified adult male | | Alamance County, North Carolina | |
| 2023-05-08 | unidentified adult male | | Tuba City, Arizona | |
| 2023-05-08 | Lee Cortez (42) | | Apple Valley, California | Officers received reports of a man walking along a road. When they arrived, they encountered Cortez bleeding from his neck and armed with a knife while walking in and out of traffic. Cortez was shot and killed after he was tased with no avail. |
| 2023-05-07 | James Rakeem Pierce (28) | Black | Ravenel, South Carolina | Deputies Evan Cubbage, 36, and Alexander Hodge, 34, conducted a traffic stop near Ravenel. The passenger, 28-year-old James Rakeem Pierce, opened fire on the deputies, hitting Cubbage three times. Both deputies returned fire and shoots him multiple times. Pierce died instantly. Cubbage was treated at the hospital and released. Hodge was uninjured in the shooting. |
| 2023-05-07 | unidentified adult male | | Round Rock, Texas | The male fled a traffic stop, and after his vehicle came to a stop due to "tire deflation device", the man was shot to death when he exited his car with a gun. |
| 2023-05-07 | unidentified adult male | | Plant City, Florida | |
| 2023-05-07 | Ronnie Clark (53) | White | Pensacola, Florida | |
| 2023-05-06 | Anthony Scott Nelon (45) | | Wichita Falls, Texas | |
| 2023-05-06 | unidentified adult male | White | Bonham, Texas | |
| 2023-05-06 | unidentified adult male (61) | | Temperance, Michigan | |
| 2023-05-06 | Mauricio Garcia (33) | Latino | Allen, Texas | Garcia shot and killed eight people at an outlet mall before being killed by police. |
| 2023-05-05 | unidentified adult male | | Mckinney, Texas | |
| 2023-05-05 | Hector Macias (32) | Latino | Los Angeles, California | |
| 2023-05-04 | Hunter Wesley Phillip Foust (15) | White | Herrick Township, Pennsylvania | Foust was slain by a Pennsylvania State trooper when he allegedly didn't follow commands to drop a weapon. |
| 2023-05-04 | Walter Kye Herman (29) | White | Ellabell, Georgia | An officer witnessed a hit and run by Herman and began pursuit. After stopping the car, the officer attempted and failed to handcuff him. Herman drove off with the officer still reaching inside the car, dragging him for a short distance. The officer shot Herman, causing both men to fall out of the car. Herman died at the scene. |
| 2023-05-04 | Curtis Smith (32) | Black | Philadelphia, Pennsylvania | Smith was shot and killed by two officers when he pulled out a gun during a physical altercation with officers. |
| 2023-05-03 | Juston Michael Reffel (46) | | La Salle, Colorado | |
| 2023-05-03 | unidentified adult male (46) | | Houston, Texas | |
| 2023-05-03 | Al Joseph Stenson (38) | Black | Sanford, Florida | A man suspected of shooting and killing a mother and her three children in Lake Wales was killed after a standoff at a motel in Sanford. |
| 2023-05-03 | Everett Rand (29) | Black | Newark, New Jersey | Rand was wanted for killing two people during a domestic dispute. Following a shootout, police shot and killed Rand. |
| 2023-05-02 | Lance Lockett (41) | Black | El Dorado, Arkansas | The circumstances of Lockett's shooting is unclear. Lockett was a suspect in 63-year-old Thomas Lockett's homicide. |
| 2023-05-02 | Jake Pawelek (39) | White | San Antonio, Texas | Pawelek was shot after firing rounds from an AR-15 style rifle. Officers were responding to reports of a disturbance. |
| 2023-05-01 | unidentified adult male | | Denver, Colorado | Police shot and killed a man who was holding his family hostage with a knife. |
| 2023-05-01 | Chace Abney (35) | White | Lincoln, Nebraska | |
| 2023-05-01 | Johnny Karris (47) | White | Cordova, Alabama | Police shot and killed Karris while trying to execute a search warrant. |
| 2023-05-01 | Mario Rushing (46) | Black | Lancaster, California | Rushing was shot and killed by a correctional officer after choking an inmate at California State Prison. |

== See also ==
- Death in custody § United States
- Henry A. Wallace Police Crime Public Database
- List of cases of police brutality
- List of countries with annual rates and counts for killings by law enforcement officers
- List of law enforcement officers killed in the line of duty in the United States
- List of law enforcement officers convicted for an on-duty killing in the United States
- List of shootings by US immigration agents
- List of police reforms related to the George Floyd protests
- List of unarmed African Americans killed by law enforcement officers in the United States
- Lists of killings by law enforcement officers
- Police brutality in the United States
- Police misconduct § United States
- Police riot § United States
- Police use of deadly force in the United States
