= Lord Baltimore =

Lord Baltimore may refer to:

== People ==
=== Fictional persons ===
- Lord Henry Baltimore, eponymous character of the Baltimore by Mike Mignola and Christopher Golden
- Lord Baltimore, Indian tracker in feature film Butch Cassidy and the Sundance Kid (1969)

=== Nobility ===
- Baron Baltimore, an extinct title in the Peerage of Ireland:
  - George Calvert, 1st Baron Baltimore (1580–1632)
  - Cecil Calvert, 2nd Baron Baltimore (Lord Baltimore), the original namesake of the City of Baltimore, Maryland and adjacent Baltimore County
  - Charles Calvert, 3rd Baron Baltimore (1637–1715)
  - Benedict Calvert, 4th Baron Baltimore (1679–1715)
  - Charles Calvert, 5th Baron Baltimore (1699–1751)
  - Frederick Calvert, 6th Baron Baltimore (1731–1771)

== Other uses ==
- Baltimore and Ohio No. 2 Lord Baltimore, steam locomotive of the Baltimore and Ohio Railroad
- Lord Baltimore Hotel, on West Baltimore and North Hanover Streets, in downtown Baltimore, Maryland
- Lord Baltimore (streetcar truck), a streetcar truck built by the Baltimore Car Wheel Company in Baltimore, Maryland, US
- "Lord Baltimore" (The Blacklist), an episode of the American TV series The Blacklist
- SS Lord Baltimore, a steamship with day service between Baltimore and Philadelphia

== Music ==
- Lord Baltimore March
- Sir Lord Baltimore, an American heavy metal band
  - Sir Lord Baltimore (album), 1971 eponymous album
  - Sir Lord Baltimore III Raw, 2006 album

== See also ==
- Baltimore (disambiguation)
