= Berlin Conclusion =

- The Blacklist episode
- Episode no.: Season 1 Episode 22
- Directed by: Michael Watkins
- Story by: Richard D'Ovidio
- Teleplay by: John Eisendrath; Jon Bokenkamp; Lukas Reiter; J. R. Orci
- Production code: 122
- Original air date: May 12, 2014

Episode chronology
← Previous "Berlin"	Next → "Lord Baltimore"
- The Blacklist season 1

"Berlin Conclusion", or "Berlin Part Two", is the twenty-second episode and season finale of the first season of the American crime drama The Blacklist. A direct continuation of "Berlin", the episode premiered in the United States on NBC on May 12, 2014.

== Plot ==
It is revealed that some passengers on the plane were killed in the crash, some are in the hospital, and a few are at large. The members of the task force start being targeted. Agent Malik is killed, and Cooper is strangled and placed into a coma. A guard (Peter Stormare) that was severely injured in the crash is questioned in the hospital, and tells a story of a man in prison whose enemy sent him parts of his dead daughter, one by one, until he managed to escape. Fitch meets with Red, saying that his organization has finally agreed to join forces with Red against Berlin, and he arranges to give Red an opportunity to escape from FBI custody. Red meets with Elizabeth and they continue to try to hunt down Berlin. Red encounters a man (Andrew Howard) believed to be Berlin and tortures him for information. Tom ambushes Elizabeth in her car and drags her into the room with a gun pointed to her head, imploring Red to give himself up. Red kills "Berlin" and inches closer to Tom. Tom shoots Red in the shoulder, prompting Liz to break free. Elizabeth and Tom scuffle and he is shot by her. With his dying breath, Tom whispers something to Elizabeth. Red says that he realized the man he had just tortured and killed is not Berlin, who is instead revealed to be the injured guard the FBI questioned in the hospital. As Cooper recovers under Ressler's watch, Elizabeth and Ressler discover that Berlin escaped his room and is at large. When agents investigate the room where the bodies of Tom and the fake Berlin should be, Tom's body is gone. Liz meets with Red and says that Tom told her that her father is alive. Red assures Elizabeth that her father definitely died in a fire. Berlin walks the streets carrying a pocket watch with the picture of a little girl, with Red concurrently carrying the same picture that he recovered from the Stewmaker. The season ends with Red removing his shirt to treat his bullet wound, revealing burn scars on his back.

== Reception ==
=== Ratings ===
"Berlin Conclusion" premiered on NBC on May 12, 2014 in the 10–11 p.m. time slot. The episode garnered a 2.6/7 Nielsen rating with 10.44 million viewers, making it the second most-watched show in its time slot behind ABC's Castle, which collected 10.59 million viewers. The season finale of the show was also the eighth most watched television show of the week.

=== Reviews ===
Jason Evans of The Wall Street Journal gave a positive review of the episode: "Wow… just jaw dropping. We were promised lots of blood by John Bokenkamp and he delivered, though he managed to keep most of the main characters alive. [...] But, all in all it was a wonderful episode and a great ending to the season. So much fun!"

Jim McMahon of IGN gave the episode a 7.5/10: "The Blacklist wraps up its first season with a hit-and-miss finale as James Spader steals the show once again". He further commented: "The first season finale was an almost perfect representation of the show on the whole: uneven, frustrating, and punctuated by thoroughly entertaining scenes with James Spader that made it all worth it".
