= New Baltimore =

New Baltimore is the name of several communities in the United States:

- New Baltimore, Indiana, an unincorporated community
- New Baltimore, Michigan, a city
- New Baltimore, New York, a town
  - New Baltimore (CDP), New York, hamlet in the town
- New Baltimore, Ohio, a census-designated place in Hamilton County
- New Baltimore, Stark County, Ohio, an unincorporated community
- New Baltimore, Pennsylvania, a borough
- New Baltimore, Virginia, an unincorporated community
