= Baltimora recta =

Scientific classification
- Kingdom: Plantae
- Clade: Tracheophytes
- Clade: Angiosperms
- Clade: Eudicots
- Clade: Asterids
- Order: Asterales
- Family: Asteraceae
- Tribe: Heliantheae
- Genus: Baltimora
- Species: B. recta

Binomial name
- Baltimora recta L.

Species of plant

Baltimora recta is a species of plant. It is native to Mexico and southern Tropical America.
