= Wasp, Tennessee =

- Unincorporated community
- Location within the state of Tennessee
- Coordinates: 35°51′16″N 82°55′56″W
- Country: United States
- State: Tennessee
- County: Cocke
- Elevation: 2,828 ft (862 m)
- Time zone: UTC-5 (Eastern (EST))
  - Summer (DST): UTC-4 (EDT)
- GNIS feature ID: 1327317

Wasp was a community located in Cocke County, in the U.S. state of Tennessee. Situated in the upper Wolf Creek Valley in the rugged eastern part of the county, Wasp thrived as an Appalachian agrarian community in the late 19th and early 20th centuries. In the 1930s, the United States Forest Service purchased Wasp and its surrounding homesteads as part of an initiative to restore the Wolf Creek watershed (which had been logged), and the community was abandoned. Today, the ruins of Wasp have been designated a "Historically Significant" area, and are maintained by the Cherokee National Forest. The ruins of Wasp provide a rare instance of the preservation of a complete early 20th-century Appalachian community's archaeological remains.

The remains of Wasp are located at just over 2,500 feet (760 m) above sea level in the western Bald Mountains a few miles east of Del Rio. Wolf Creek flows northward through the former community en route to its mouth along the French Broad River near the community of Wolf Creek. A crudely maintained network of forest service roads pass through Wasp, connecting it with U.S. Route 70 in the French Broad valley to the north and the Round Mountain campground near Lemon Gap to the south. The Appalachian Trail crosses the 4,300-foot (1,300 m) summit of Walnut Mountain just south of Wasp, and a spur trail connects the A.T.'s Walnut Mountain shelter with the upper Wolf Creek Valley.

Although located just south of the French Broad Valley— which was an oft-used 18th-century migration route— the Wolf Creek area likely remained unsettled until the mid-19th century. After the U.S. Civil War, railroad companies attempted to complete a line through the French Broad Valley to connect Newport and Hot Springs, but ran into numerous financial and engineering obstacles. By 1870, the Tennessee half of the line reached only to the community of Wolf Creek, where passengers were transferred to a stagecoach that carried them up the valley to Hot Springs. In subsequent years, railroad company employees moved into the Wolf Creek Valley. Wasp was probably established around 1890, and by the early 1900s had its own post office, school, mission house, and gristmill. The U.S. Forest Service began acquiring the upper Wolf Creek Valley in 1935. At present, the deteriorated schoolhouse and mission house remain, along with the cemetery and the ruins of several farmsteads.* 5/4/18. A satellite view of the community of Wasp shows no trace of the ruins of any of the things mentioned here. A ground search shows the area to be heavily logged where the structures were said to be. No foundations, buildings, chimneys or one stone is left upon another of any of the things that were said to be present in this entry.
