= USS Baltimore =

USS Baltimore may refer to:

- USS Baltimore (1777), was a 12-gun brigantine that served in the Continental Navy from 1777 to 1780.
- USS Baltimore (1798), was a 20-gun ship built in 1798.
- USS Baltimore (1848), was a side-wheel steamer captured in 1861.
- USS Baltimore (C-3), was a protected cruiser commissioned in 1890.

- The Baltimore crisis, an 1891 diplomatic incident involving USS Baltimore (C-3)

- USS Baltimore (CA-68), was a heavy cruiser commissioned in 1943.
- USS Baltimore (SSN-704), was a Los Angeles-class nuclear attack submarine, decommissioned on 10 July 1998.
- USS Baltimore (SSN-812), a future Virginia-class nuclear attack submarine

== See also ==
- USCS Baltimore
