= Liberty Hill, Cocke County, Tennessee =

Liberty Hill, Tennessee
- Unincorporated community
- Location within Tennessee Location within the United States
- Coordinates: 36°04′39″N 83°10′27″W
- Country: United States
- State: Tennessee
- County: Cocke
- Elevation: 1,165 ft (355 m)
- Time zone: UTC-5 (Eastern (EST))
  - Summer (DST): UTC-4 (EDT)
- Area code: 423
- GNIS feature ID: 1291154

Liberty Hill is an unincorporated community in Cocke County, Tennessee, United States. Liberty Hill is located on Tennessee State Route 160 7.7 miles (12.4 km) north of Newport.
