= Boomer, Tennessee =

- Unincorporated community
- Location within Tennessee Location within the United States
- Coordinates: 35°49′40″N 82°57′39″W
- Country: United States
- State: Tennessee
- County: Cocke
- Elevation: 2,953 ft (900 m)
- Time zone: UTC-5 (Eastern (EST))
  - Summer (DST): UTC-4 (EDT)
- Area code: 423
- GNIS feature ID: 1327680

Boomer is an unincorporated community in Cocke County, Tennessee, United States.
