= Cocke County, Tennessee =

County in Tennessee, United States

- County
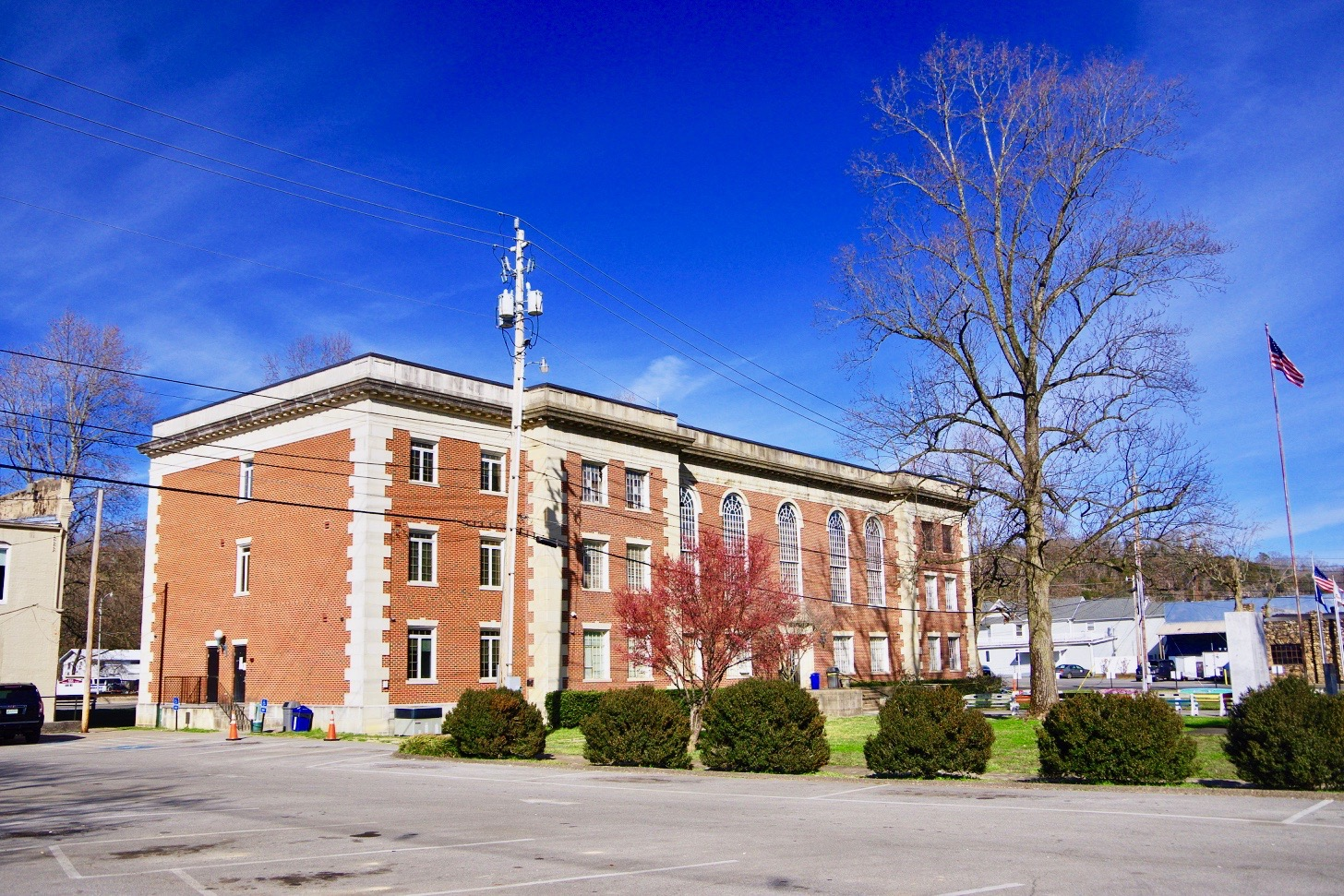
- Cocke County Courthouse in Newport

- Seal

- Location within the U.S. state of Tennessee
- Coordinates: 35°56′N 83°07′W
- Country: United States
- State: Tennessee
- Founded: October 9, 1797
- Named for: William Cocke
- Seat: Newport
- Largest city: Newport

Area
  - Total: 443 sq mi (1,150 km^{2})
  - Land: 435 sq mi (1,130 km^{2})
  - Water: 8.6 sq mi (22 km^{2}) 1.9%

Population (2020)
  - Total: 35,999
  - Estimate (2025): 37,889 ▲
  - Density: 82/sq mi (32/km^{2})
- Time zone: UTC−5 (Eastern)
  - Summer (DST): UTC−4 (EDT)
- Congressional district: 1st
- Website: www.cockecountytn.gov

Cocke County is a county on the eastern border of the U.S. state of Tennessee. As of the 2020 census, the population was 35,999. Its county seat is Newport. Cocke County comprises the Newport, TN Micropolitan Statistical Area, which is part of the Knoxville–Morristown–Sevierville, Tennessee Combined Statistical Area.

== History ==
Before the arrival of European settlers, the area that is now Cocke County probably was inhabited by the Cherokee. They were the most recent of a series of indigenous cultures who had occupied this country for thousands of years.

The first recorded European settlement in the county was in 1783 when land near the fork of the French Broad and the Pigeon Rivers was cleared and cultivated. The earliest European settlers were primarily Scots-Irish, Dutch, and Germans who came to the area over the mountains from the Carolinas or through Virginia from Pennsylvania and other northern states.

The county was established by an Act of the Tennessee General Assembly on October 9, 1797, from a part of Greene County, Tennessee. It was named after William Cocke, one of the state's first Senators. Located within the Appalachian and Great Smoky Mountains, it had difficult conditions for early settlers.

Like many East Tennessee counties, settled by yeomen farmers, Cocke County was largely pro-Union on the eve of the Civil War. In Tennessee's Ordinance of Secession referendum on June 8, 1861, the county's residents voted 1,185 to 518 against secession.

== Geography ==
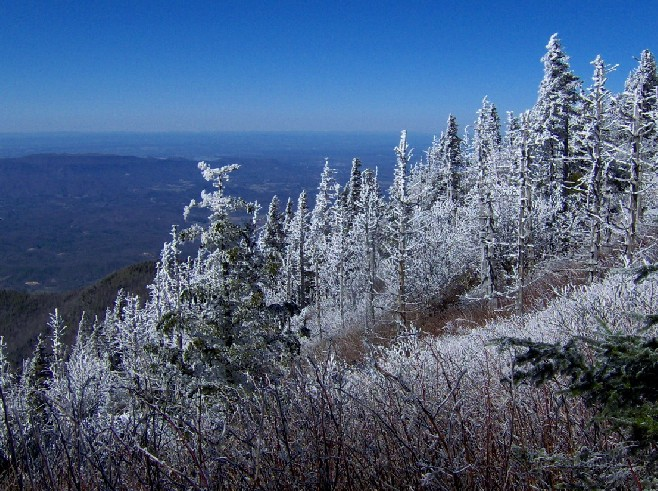
View from the slopes of Old Black

According to the U.S. Census Bureau, the county has a total area of 443 square miles (1,150 km^{2}), of which 435 square miles (1,130 km^{2}) are land and 8.6 square miles (22 km^{2}) (1.9%) are covered by water. The southern part of the county is located within the Great Smoky Mountains, and the lands are protected by the Great Smoky Mountains National Park. The northern part of the county is situated within the Ridge-and-Valley Appalachians. The county's highest point is Old Black, which rises to 6,370 feet (1,940 m) in the Smokies along the county's border with North Carolina. English Mountain, a large ridge that peaks at 3,629 feet (1,106 m), dominates the western part of the county.

Cocke County is drained by the French Broad River, which traverses the northern part of the county and forms much of its boundary with Jefferson County. A portion of this river is part of Douglas Lake, an artificial reservoir created by Douglas Dam further downstream. The Pigeon River flows northward across the county and empties into the French Broad north of Newport at Irish Bottoms.

=== Adjacent counties ===
- Hamblen County (north)
- Greene County (northeast)
- Madison County, North Carolina (southeast)
- Haywood County, North Carolina (south)
- Sevier County (southwest)
- Jefferson County (northwest)

=== National protected areas ===
- Appalachian Trail (part)
- Cherokee National Forest (part)
- Foothills Parkway (part)
- Great Smoky Mountains National Park (part)

=== State protected areas ===
- Rankin Wildlife Management Area (part)
- Martha Sundquist State Forest

=== Major highways ===
- I-40
- US 70
- US 25
- US 25E
- US 25W
- US 321
- US 411
- SR 32
- SR 73

== Demographics ==
Historical population
Census	Pop.	Note	%±
1810	5,154		—
1820	4,892		−5.1%
1830	6,017		23.0%
1840	6,992		16.2%
1850	8,300		18.7%
1860	10,408		25.4%
1870	12,458		19.7%
1880	14,808		18.9%
1890	16,523		11.6%
1900	19,153		15.9%
1910	19,399		1.3%
1920	20,782		7.1%
1930	21,775		4.8%
1940	24,083		10.6%
1950	22,991		−4.5%
1960	23,390		1.7%
1970	25,283		8.1%
1980	28,792		13.9%
1990	29,141		1.2%
2000	33,565		15.2%
2010	35,662		6.2%
2020	35,999		0.9%
2025 (est.)	37,889	▲	5.3%
U.S. Decennial Census; 1790-1960 1900-1990; 1990-2000 2010-2014

=== Racial and ethnic composition ===
Cocke County, Tennessee – Racial and ethnic composition Note: the US Census treats Hispanic/Latino as an ethnic category. This table excludes Latinos from the racial categories and assigns them to a separate category. Hispanics/Latinos may be of any race.
Race / ethnicity (NH = Non-Hispanic)	Pop 1980	Pop 1990	Pop 2000	Pop 2010	Pop 2020	% 1980	% 1990	% 2000	% 2010	% 2020
White alone (NH)	27,828	28,278	32,056	33,598	32,733	96.65%	97.04%	95.50%	94.21%	90.93%
Black or African American alone (NH)	667	612	668	659	582	2.32%	2.10%	1.99%	1.85%	1.62%
Native American or Alaska Native alone (NH)	26	77	110	113	126	0.09%	0.26%	0.33%	0.32%	0.35%
Asian alone (NH)	15	28	52	105	150	0.05%	0.10%	0.15%	0.29%	0.42%
Native Hawaiian or Pacific Islander alone (NH)	x	x	5	19	9	x	x	0.01%	0.05%	0.03%
Other race alone (NH)	28	2	18	11	46	0.10%	0.01%	0.05%	0.03%	0.13%
Mixed race or Multiracial (NH)	x	x	302	529	1,399	x	x	0.90%	1.48%	3.89%
Hispanic or Latino (any race)	228	144	354	628	954	0.79%	0.49%	1.05%	1.76%	2.65%
Total	28,792	29,141	33,565	35,662	35,999	100.00%	100.00%	100.00%	100.00%	100.00%

=== 2020 census ===
As of the 2020 census, there were 35,999 people, 15,246 households, and 9,196 families residing in the county. The median age was 46.6 years, 19.6% of residents were under the age of 18, and 22.1% of residents were 65 years of age or older. For every 100 females there were 96.5 males, and for every 100 females age 18 and over there were 94.0 males age 18 and over.

The racial makeup of the county was 91.7% White, 1.6% Black or African American, 0.5% American Indian and Alaska Native, 0.5% Asian, <0.1% Native Hawaiian and Pacific Islander, 0.8% from some other race, and 4.9% from two or more races. Hispanic or Latino residents of any race comprised 2.7% of the population.

32.1% of residents lived in urban areas, while 67.9% lived in rural areas.

There were 15,246 households in the county, of which 26.0% had children under the age of 18 living in them. Of all households, 44.2% were married-couple households, 20.3% were households with a male householder and no spouse or partner present, and 27.7% were households with a female householder and no spouse or partner present. About 29.8% of all households were made up of individuals, and 13.7% had someone living alone who was 65 years of age or older.

There were 17,808 housing units, of which 14.4% were vacant. Among occupied housing units, 71.0% were owner-occupied and 29.0% were renter-occupied. The homeowner vacancy rate was 1.7% and the rental vacancy rate was 6.3%.

=== 2000 census ===
As of the census of 2000, 33,565 people, 13,762 households, and 9,715 families were residing in the county. The population density was 77 people per square mile (30 people/km^{2}). The 15,844 housing units averaged 36/mi^{2} (14/km^{2}). The racial makeup of the county was 96.16% White, 1.99% African American, 0.40% Native American, 0.15% Asian, 0.33% from other races, and 0.96% from two or more races. About 1.05% of the population was Hispanic or Latino of any race.

Of the 13,762 households, 29.50% had children under the age of 18 living with them, 53.10% were married couples living together, 13.00% had a female householder with no husband present, and 29.40% were not families. About 25.70% of all households were made up of individuals, and 10.10% had someone living alone who was 65 years of age or older. The average household size was 2.41 and the average family size was 2.87.

In the county, the population was distributed as 22.80% under the age of 18, 8.30% from 18 to 24, 28.80% from 25 to 44, 26.40% from 45 to 64, and 13.60% who were 65 years of age or older. The median age was 39 years. For every 100 females, there were 94.60 males. For every 100 females age 18 and over, there were 92.80 males.

The median income for a household in the county was $25,553, and for a family was $30,418. Males had a median income of $26,062 versus $18,826 for females. The per capita income for the county was $13,881. About 18.70% of families and 22.50% of the population were below the poverty line, including 31.80% of those under age 18 and 18.70% of those age 65 or over.

== Communities ==
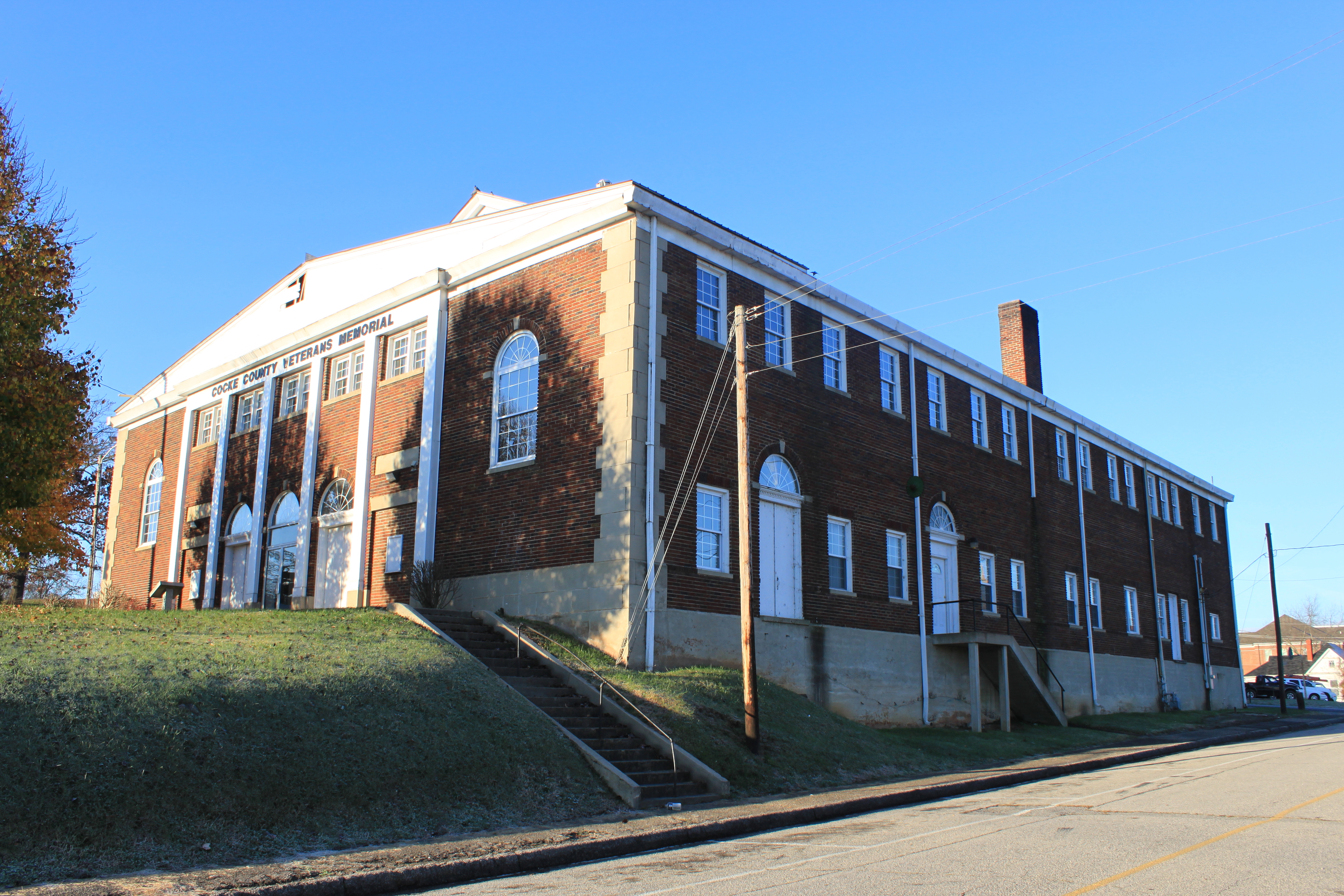
Cocke County Memorial Building in Newport

=== City ===
- Newport, county seat

=== Town ===
- Parrottsville

=== Census-designated Place ===
- Cosby

=== Unincorporated communities ===
- Allen Grove
- Baltimore
- Boomer
- Briar Thicket
- Bridgeport
- Bybee
- Del Rio
- Hartford
- Liberty Hill
- Midway
- Tom Town
- Wasp

== Notable residents ==
- Ben W. Hooper, governor of Tennessee from 1911 to 1915
- J. E. Rankin, banker and mayor of Asheville, North Carolina
- Popcorn Sutton, moonshiner
- Marshall Teague, actor

== In popular culture ==
The novel Christy and the television series of the same name are based on historical events, people, and localities of Cocke County. The fictional small town of El Pano, where the novel begins, is based on the existing village of Del Rio, Tennessee. The fictional Cutter Gap, where most of the plot unfolds, represents the locale now known as Chapel Hollow. Several area landmarks associated with the story are marked for visitors, including the site of the Ebenezer Mission in Chapel Hollow, which is located off the Old Fifteenth Rd., about 5 miles (8.0 km) from Del Rio.

== Politics ==
United States presidential election results for Cocke County, Tennessee
Year	Republican		Democratic		Third party(ies)	
Year	No.	%	No.	%	No.	%
1912	757	39.57%	597	31.21%	559	29.22%
1916	1,478	70.85%	595	28.52%	13	0.62%
1920	3,283	77.36%	929	21.89%	32	0.75%
1924	2,556	73.13%	921	26.35%	18	0.52%
1928	2,908	80.00%	722	19.86%	5	0.14%
1932	2,324	59.36%	1,557	39.77%	34	0.87%
1936	3,731	75.31%	1,217	24.57%	6	0.12%
1940	3,521	75.35%	1,098	23.50%	54	1.16%
1944	3,554	78.14%	989	21.75%	5	0.11%
1948	3,576	77.50%	939	20.35%	99	2.15%
1952	5,688	82.02%	1,247	17.98%	0	0.00%
1956	5,526	82.29%	1,121	16.69%	68	1.01%
1960	6,581	81.30%	1,442	17.81%	72	0.89%
1964	5,084	70.68%	2,109	29.32%	0	0.00%
1968	5,645	72.80%	950	12.25%	1,159	14.95%
1972	5,268	85.62%	805	13.08%	80	1.30%
1976	5,004	60.88%	3,141	38.22%	74	0.90%
1980	6,802	74.39%	2,139	23.39%	203	2.22%
1984	6,665	75.50%	2,068	23.43%	95	1.08%
1988	5,430	71.65%	2,115	27.91%	34	0.45%
1992	5,298	52.98%	3,495	34.95%	1,207	12.07%
1996	4,481	51.56%	3,326	38.27%	884	10.17%
2000	6,185	60.41%	3,872	37.82%	182	1.78%
2004	8,297	67.40%	3,935	31.96%	79	0.64%
2008	8,945	71.67%	3,340	26.76%	196	1.57%
2012	8,459	73.85%	2,804	24.48%	191	1.67%
2016	9,791	80.74%	1,981	16.34%	354	2.92%
2020	12,162	81.85%	2,533	17.05%	164	1.10%
2024	13,105	83.67%	2,415	15.42%	143	0.91%

Like all of Unionist East Tennessee, Cocke County has been overwhelmingly Republican ever since the Civil War. Since the first postwar election in 1868, Cocke County has voted for every Republican presidential candidate, even supporting William Howard Taft during the divided 1912 election. No Democratic presidential candidate has managed to receive forty percent of the county's vote in this time, although Franklin D. Roosevelt in his 1932 landslide got within 0.23 percent of this figure.

== See also ==
- Cocke County High School
- National Register of Historic Places listings in Cocke County, Tennessee
- Weaver family (North Carolina)
