= Midway, Cocke County, Tennessee =

Midway
- Unincorporated community
- Location within Tennessee Location within the United States
- Coordinates: 35°52′11″N 83°01′50″W
- Country: United States
- State: Tennessee
- County: Cocke
- Elevation: 1,503 ft (458 m)
- Time zone: UTC-5 (Eastern (EST))
  - Summer (DST): UTC-4 (EDT)
- Area code: 423
- GNIS feature ID: 1293725

Midway is an unincorporated community in Cocke County, Tennessee. Midway is 11.1 miles (17.9 km) southeast of Newport.
