= Tom Town, Tennessee =

- Unincorporated community
- Location within Tennessee Location within the United States
- Coordinates: 35°50′43″N 83°01′00″W
- Country: United States
- State: Tennessee
- County: Cocke
- Elevation: 1,713 ft (522 m)
- Time zone: UTC-5 (Eastern (EST))
  - Summer (DST): UTC-4 (EDT)
- Area code: 423
- GNIS feature ID: 1314413

Tom Town is an unincorporated community in Cocke County, Tennessee, United States. Tom Town is 12.75 miles (20.52 km) southeast of Newport. The elevation of Tom Town is 1,722 feet.
