= Allen Grove, Tennessee =

Unincorporated community in Tennessee, US

Coordinates: 35°50′28″N 83°13′03″W

Allen Grove is an unincorporated community in Cocke County, Tennessee, in the United States.

== History ==
Allen Grove was named for Isaac Allen, who donated the land where a church and schoolhouse stood.
