= Bybee, Tennessee =

- Unincorporated community
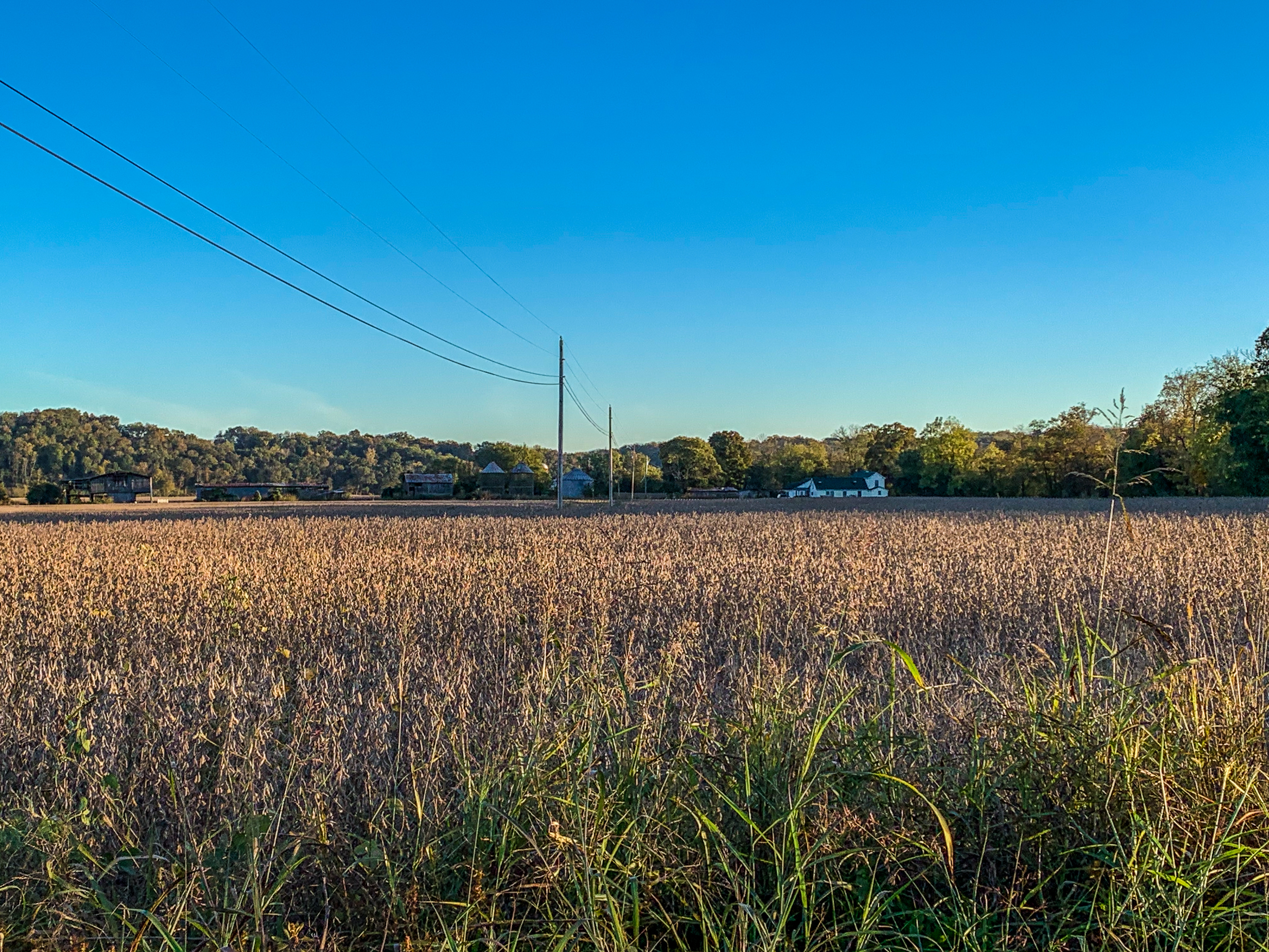
- A farm in Bybee

- Location within Tennessee Location within the United States
- Coordinates: 36°02′53″N 83°10′46″W
- Country: United States
- State: Tennessee
- County: Cocke
- Elevation.: 1,116 ft (340 m)
- Time zone: UTC-5 (Eastern (EST))
  - Summer (DST): UTC-4 (EDT)
- ZIP code: 37713
- Area codes: 423, 865
- GNIS feature ID: 1305576

Bybee is an unincorporated community in Cocke County, Tennessee, United States. Its ZIP code is 37713.

Bybee is the location of Briarwood Ranch Safari Park.
