= New Baltimore, Stark County, Ohio =

Unincorporated community in Ohio, U.S.

Coordinates: 40°59′6″N 81°15′0″W

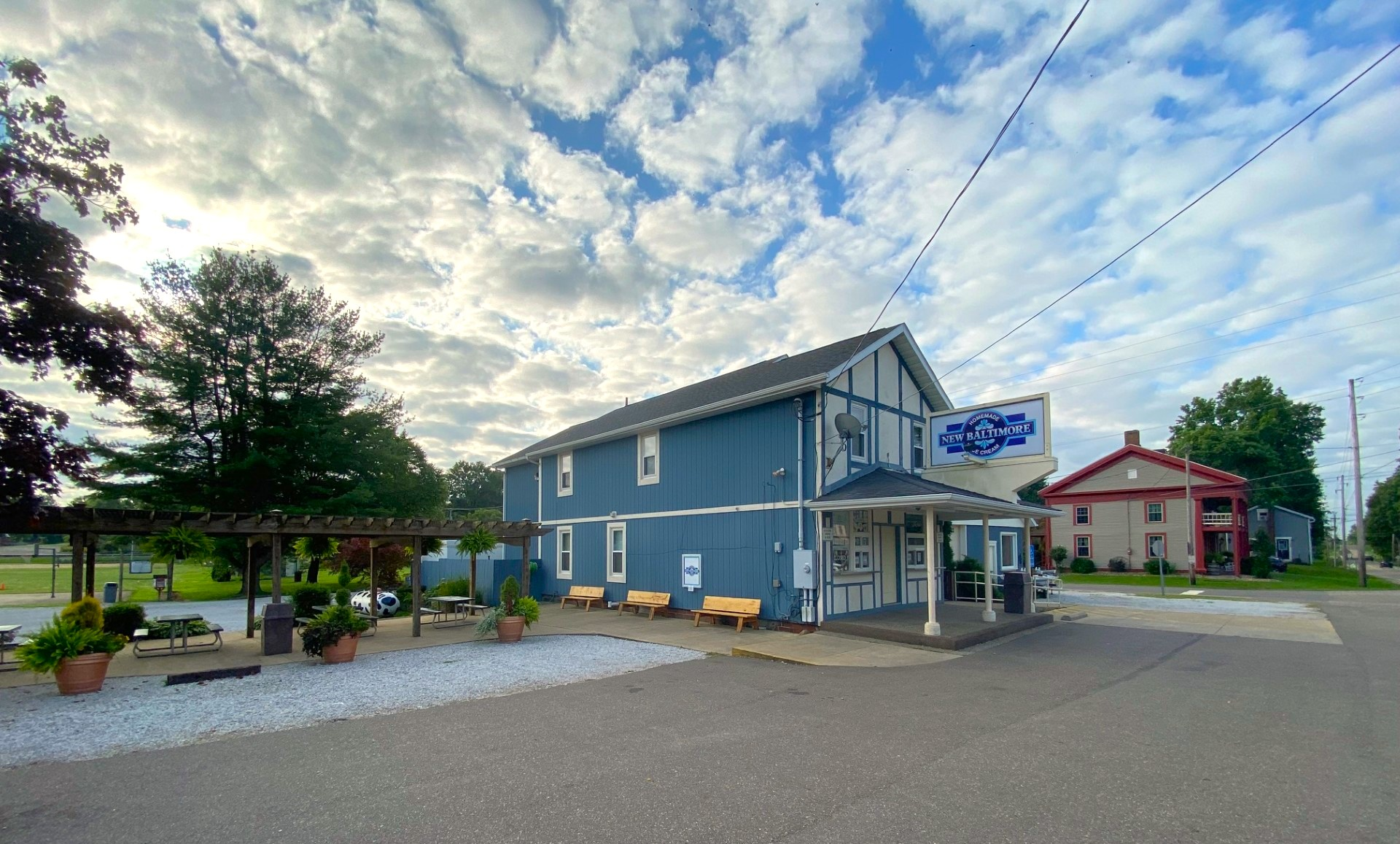
New Baltimore Ice Cream

New Baltimore is an unincorporated community in Stark County, in the U.S. state of Ohio.

== History ==
New Baltimore was platted in 1831. A post office called New Baltimore was established in 1837, and remained in operation until 1904.
