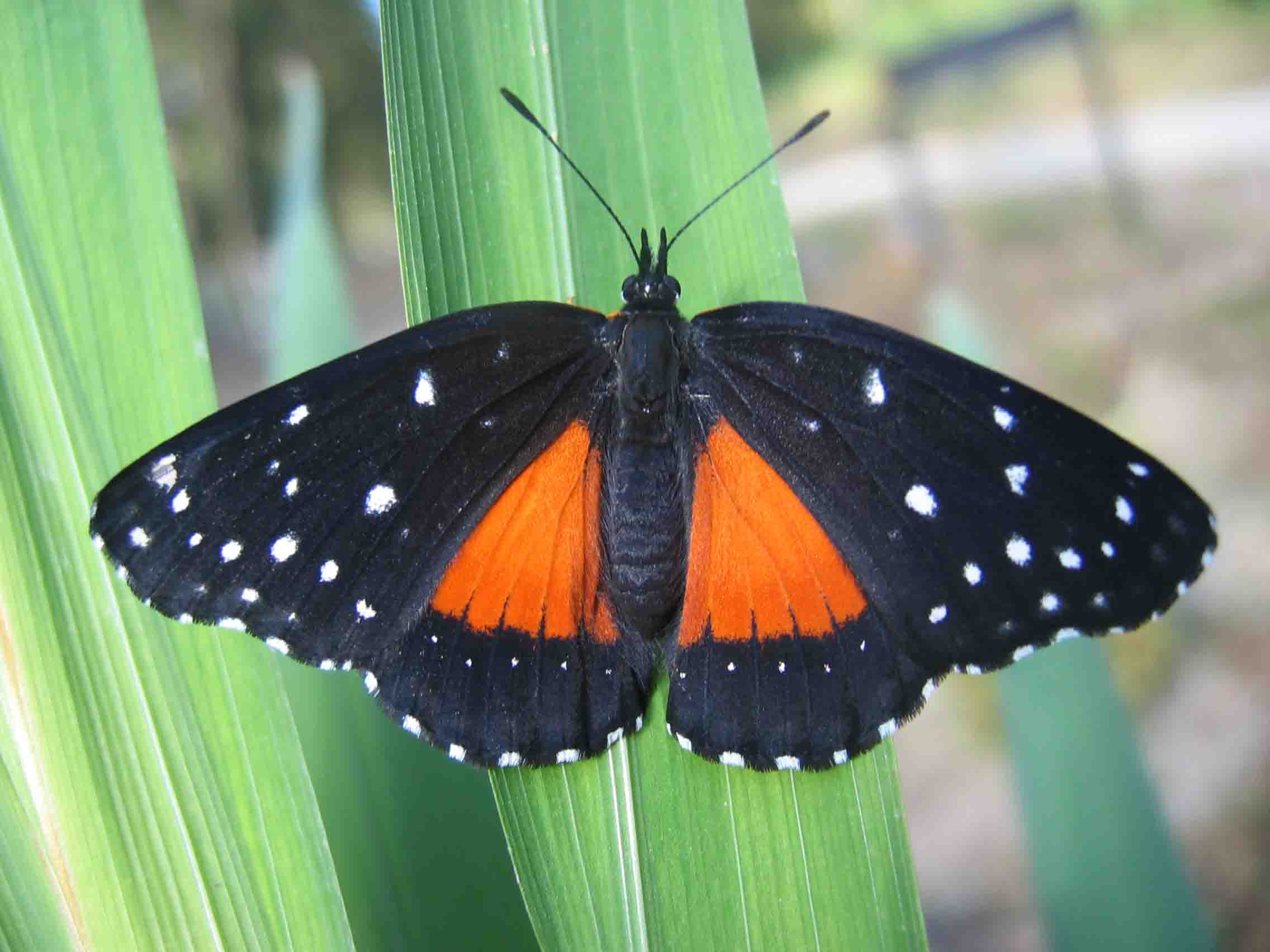

Scientific classification
- Domain: Eukaryota
- Kingdom: Animalia
- Phylum: Arthropoda
- Class: Insecta
- Order: Lepidoptera
- Family: Nymphalidae
- Genus: Chlosyne
- Species: C. rosita

Binomial name
- Chlosyne rosita A. Hall, 1924

= Chlosyne rosita =

Species of butterfly

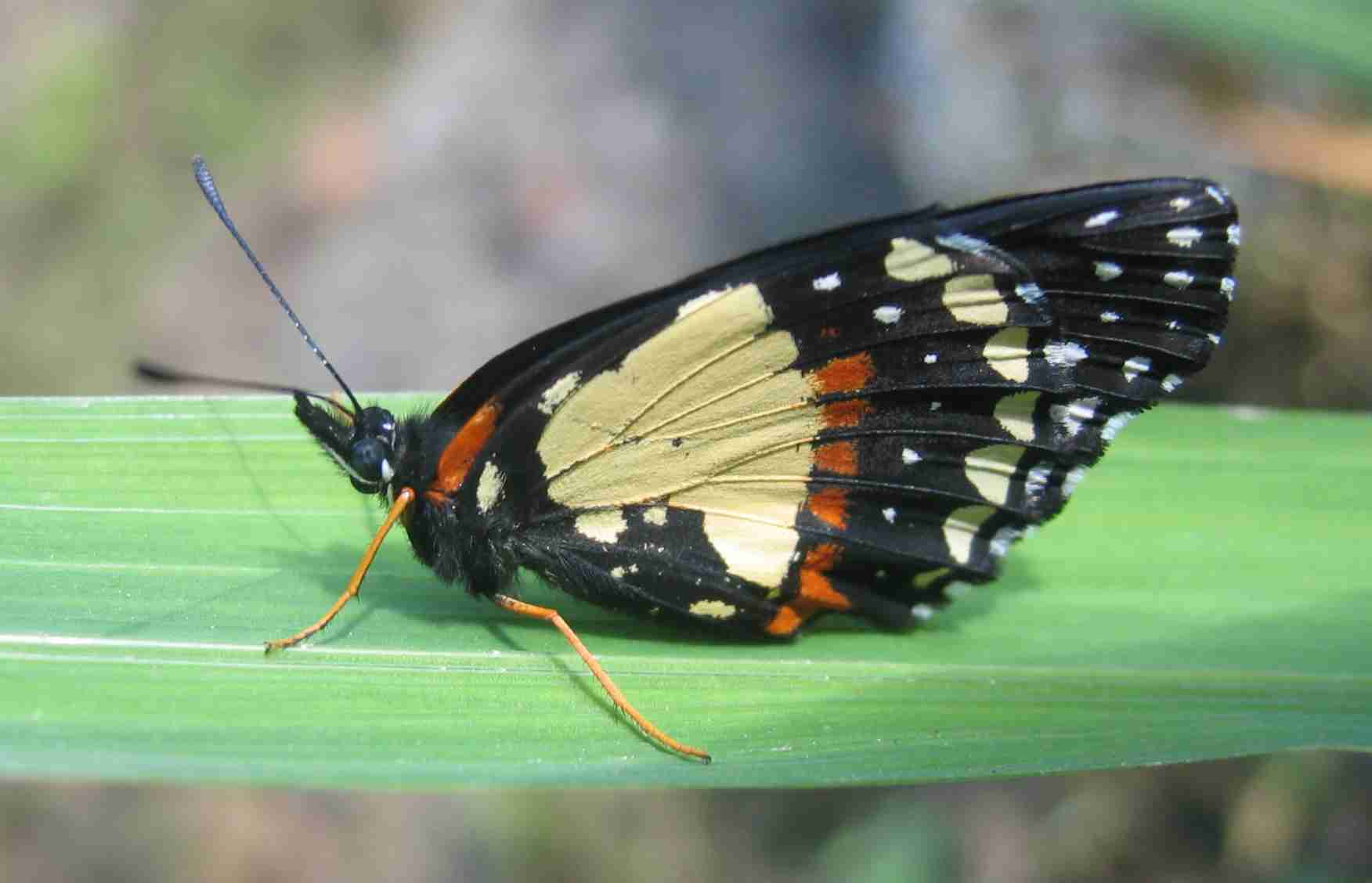
Underside of wings

The rosita patch (Chlosyne rosita) is a butterfly from the family Nymphalidae, similar in appearance to the more common crimson patch. It is a striking butterfly with orange-red patches on the wings. It can be found throughout Central America and Mexico, and is occasional in the southwestern United States.
