= Lord Baltimore March =

Song
- Language: English
- Released: November 26, 1906
- Songwriter: Henry Fillmore

Audio sample
- Performed by Prince's Military Band: file; help

The Lord Baltimore March is an American patriotic song by Henry Fillmore, named for the Lord Baltimore, colonial proprietors of Province of Maryland.

Composed around the turn of the century, it was performed publicly in 1904.

The song was first released on phonograph record and phonograph cylinder by Columbia Records on Monday, November 26, 1906. In 1909, the United States military band recorded their performance of the march.
