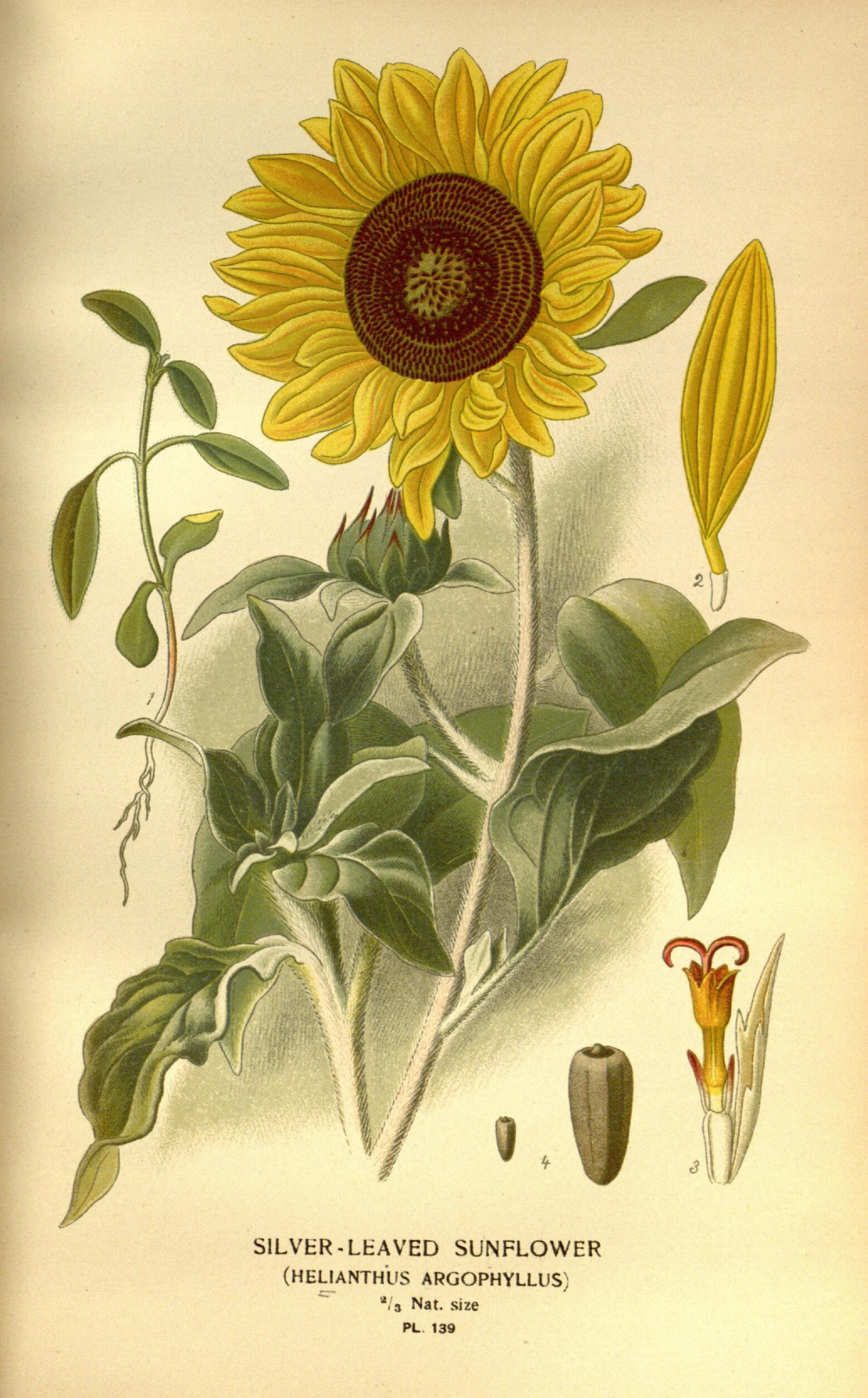

Conservation status
- Least Concern (IUCN 3.1)

Scientific classification
- Kingdom: Plantae
- Clade: Tracheophytes
- Clade: Angiosperms
- Clade: Eudicots
- Clade: Asterids
- Order: Asterales
- Family: Asteraceae
- Tribe: Heliantheae
- Genus: Helianthus
- Species: H. argophyllus

Binomial name
- Helianthus argophyllus Torr. & A.Gray

= Helianthus argophyllus =

Species of sunflower

Helianthus argophyllus is a North American species of sunflower known by the common name silverleaf sunflower. It is native to the coastal regions of the US state of Texas, and naturalized in other places (Florida, North Carolina, Argentina, Africa, Australia, etc.).

Helianthus argophyllus is an annual herb sometimes as much as 300 cm (10 feet) tall. Leaves and stems appear silvery because of a coating of many hairs along the surface. One plant can produce 1-5 flower heads, each 15–20 ray florets surrounding 150 or more disc florets. The plant grows in sandy areas near the seacoast.

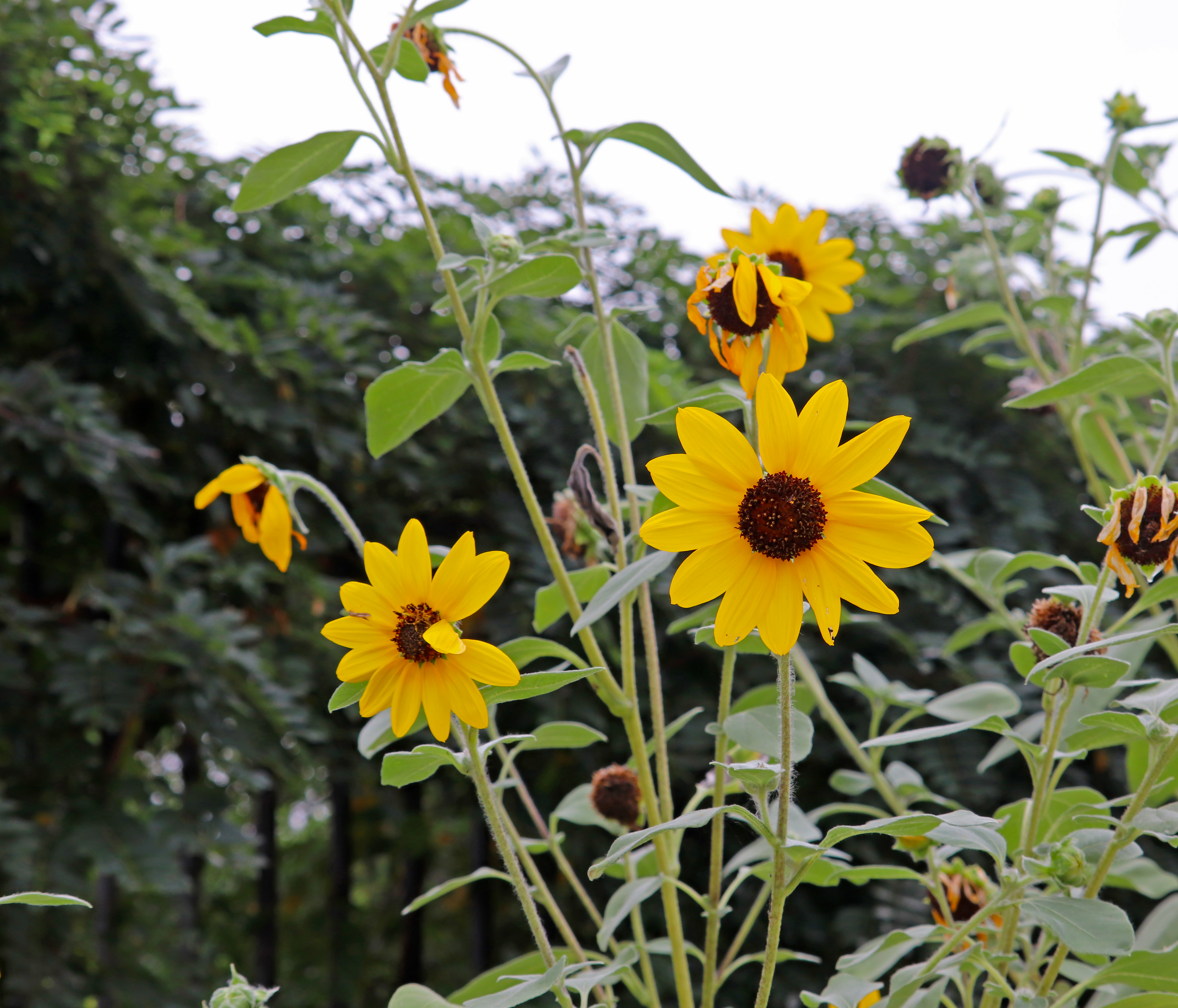
Helianthus argophyllus 'Gold and Silver'
