= Baltimore, Tennessee =

Unincorporated community in Tennessee, US

Coordinates: 35°59′03″N 83°03′34″W

Baltimore is an unincorporated community in Cocke County, Tennessee, in the United States. It took its name after Baltimore, Maryland.
