= Lord Baltimore (The Blacklist) =

- The Blacklist episode
- Episode no.: Season 2 Episode 1
- Directed by: Michael Watkins
- Written by: Jon Bokenkamp; John Eisendrath
- Production code: 201
- Original air date: September 22, 2014

Guest appearances
- Mary-Louise Parker as Naomi Hyland; Krysten Ritter as Rowan/Nora Mills; Hisham Tawfiq as Dembe Zuma; Jason Butler Harner as Walter Gary Martin; Adriane Lenox as Reven Wright; Lee Tergesen as Frank Hyland; Hal Ozsan as Ezra; Adam David Thompson as Marcus; Marceline Hugot as Mother; Babs Olusanmokun as Yaabari's Soldier; Sahr Ngaujah as General Yaabari; Amy Hohn as Dr. Friedman; Andy Murray as Marcus' Associate; Peter Stormare as Berlin

Episode chronology
← Previous "Berlin Conclusion"	Next → "Monarch Douglas Bank"
- The Blacklist season 2

"Lord Baltimore" is the first episode of the second season of the American crime drama The Blacklist. The episode premiered in the United States on NBC on September 22, 2014.

== Plot ==
While continuing his battle with Berlin, Red receives intelligence from a Cameroonian warlord that a person named "Lord Baltimore", an information broker, hired a bounty hunter to kill him. Meanwhile, Liz goes through the process of annulling her marriage with Tom, and is unknowingly under surveillance by an unknown party. During the investigation into Lord Baltimore, the task force questions Rowan Mills (Krysten Ritter), a supposed victim. Further investigation into Mills reveals she is actually Rowan's twin sister, Nora Mills, a covert operative who has an engineered dissociative identity disorder, and is also the actual Lord Baltimore. Red learns during his brief captivity by a Mossad agent, Samar Navabi (Mozhan Marnò), that Baltimore's intended target is his ex-wife, Naomi Hyland (special guest star Mary-Louise Parker). Liz attempts to evacuate Naomi, but her team is ambushed by a kidnapping group led by Mills. While Liz successfully captures Mills, Red attempts to rescue Naomi at a designated apartment only to find a locket instead. Red later receives a package with a cell phone provided by Berlin, who taunts him that Naomi will be sent to Red "piece by piece", proving this when Red finds a finger in the package. Harold Cooper returns to his role as the Task Force's acting director after a visit from Reddington.

== Reception ==
=== Ratings ===
"Lord Baltimore" premiered on NBC on September 22, 2014 in the 10–11 p.m. time slot. The episode garnered a 3.4/10 Nielsen rating with 12.34 million viewers, making it the highest-rated show in its timeslot and the fourteenth most-watched show of the week.

=== Reviews ===
Jim McMahon of IGN gave the episode a 7.8/10: "'Lord Baltimore' is a pretty good balancing act, giving us a villain of the week while dealing with the fallout of last season's finale". He went on to praise the opening scene of the episode, writing: "The highlight of the episode was the opening sequence in Africa, which provided a fitting reintroduction to Red and, almost as an afterthought, got the ball rolling on the plot".

Ross Bonaime of Paste gave the episode a 7.0/10. He wrote: "The first season of The Blacklist had a multitude of problems, and 'Lord Baltimore' still showcases many of them. But it does seem like the writers are trying to fix the problems that really made the show so uneventful and unfulfilling. It's not a gigantic shift for The Blacklist, but hey, it feels like a move in the right direction".
