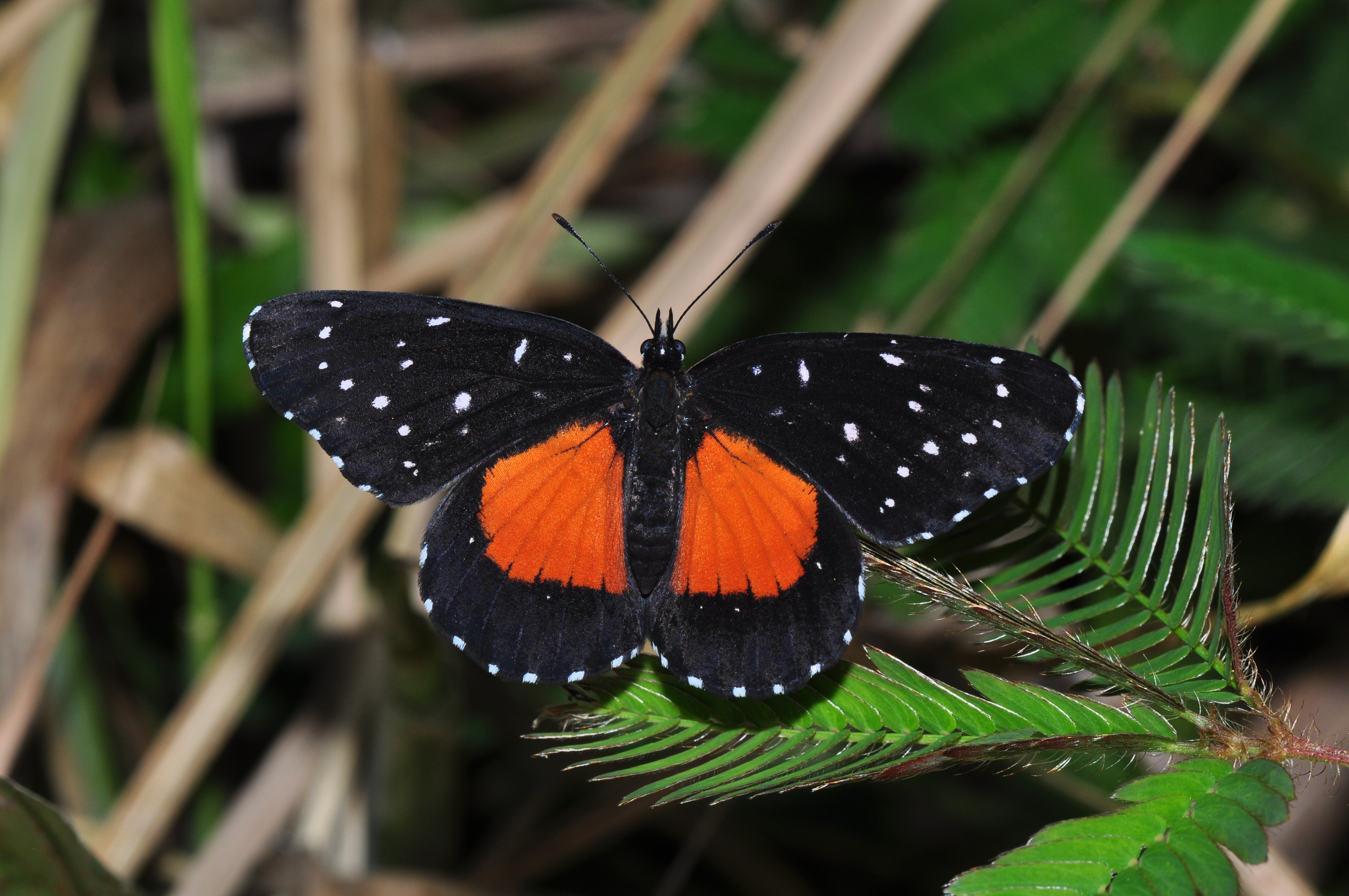

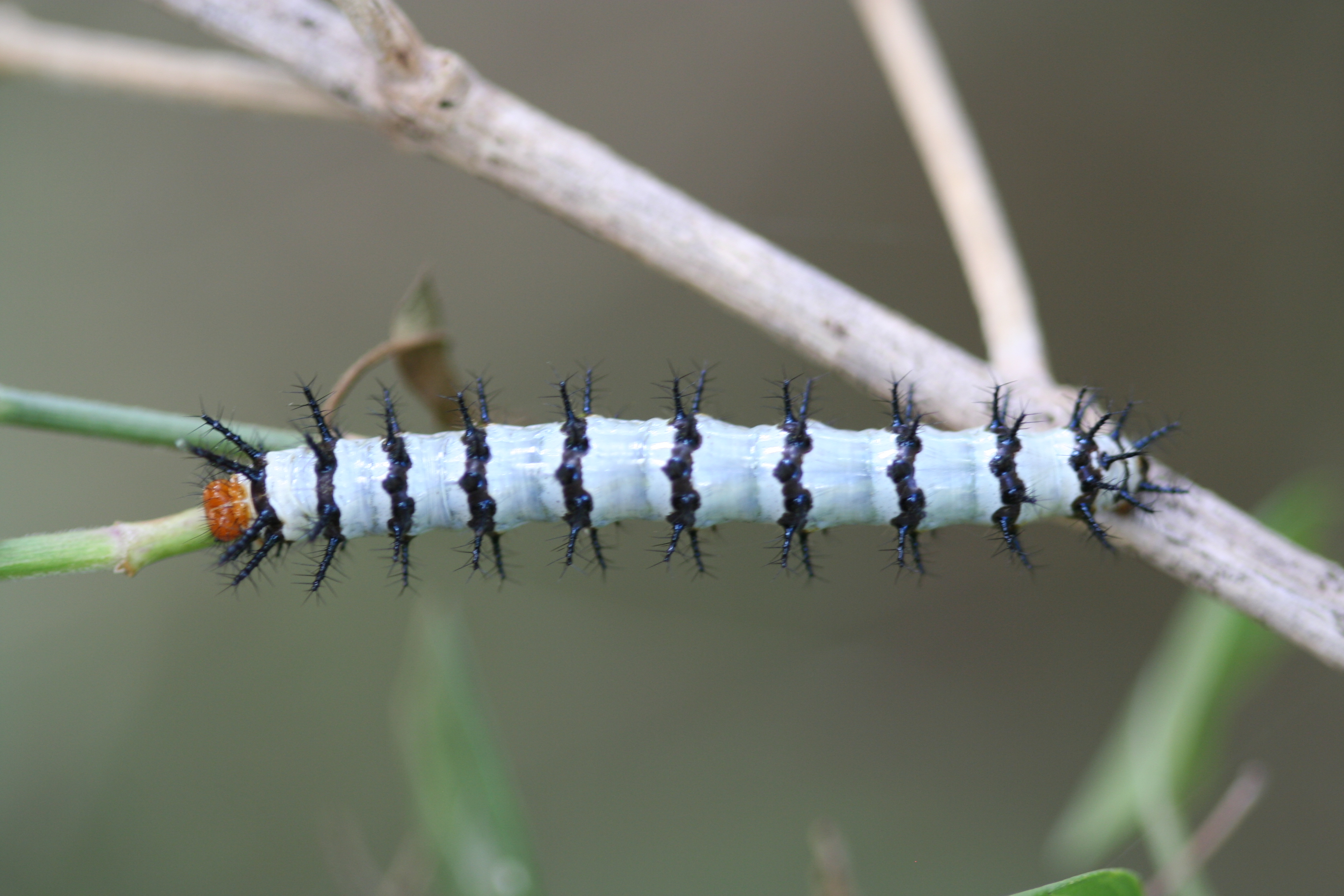
- imago and caterpillar

Scientific classification
- Kingdom: Animalia
- Phylum: Arthropoda
- Class: Insecta
- Order: Lepidoptera
- Family: Nymphalidae
- Genus: Chlosyne
- Species: C. janais

Binomial name
- Chlosyne janais Drury, 1782

= Chlosyne janais =

Crimson patch

Species of butterfly

Chlosyne janais, the crimson patch or janais patch, is a common New World butterfly found from Colombia north through Central America and Mexico to southern Texas, with occasional sightings in southeastern Mexico and northern Texas. The dorsal and ventral wing surface is black with several undulating rows of small white spots on the medial forewings and along all outer wing margins. On each dorsal hindwing is a medial orange-red patch situated anteriorly. The ventral hindwings have a fragmented yellow proximal patch bordered by a thick postmedial band of red that does not reach the wing margins; maximum wingspan is 4.8–6.7 cm.

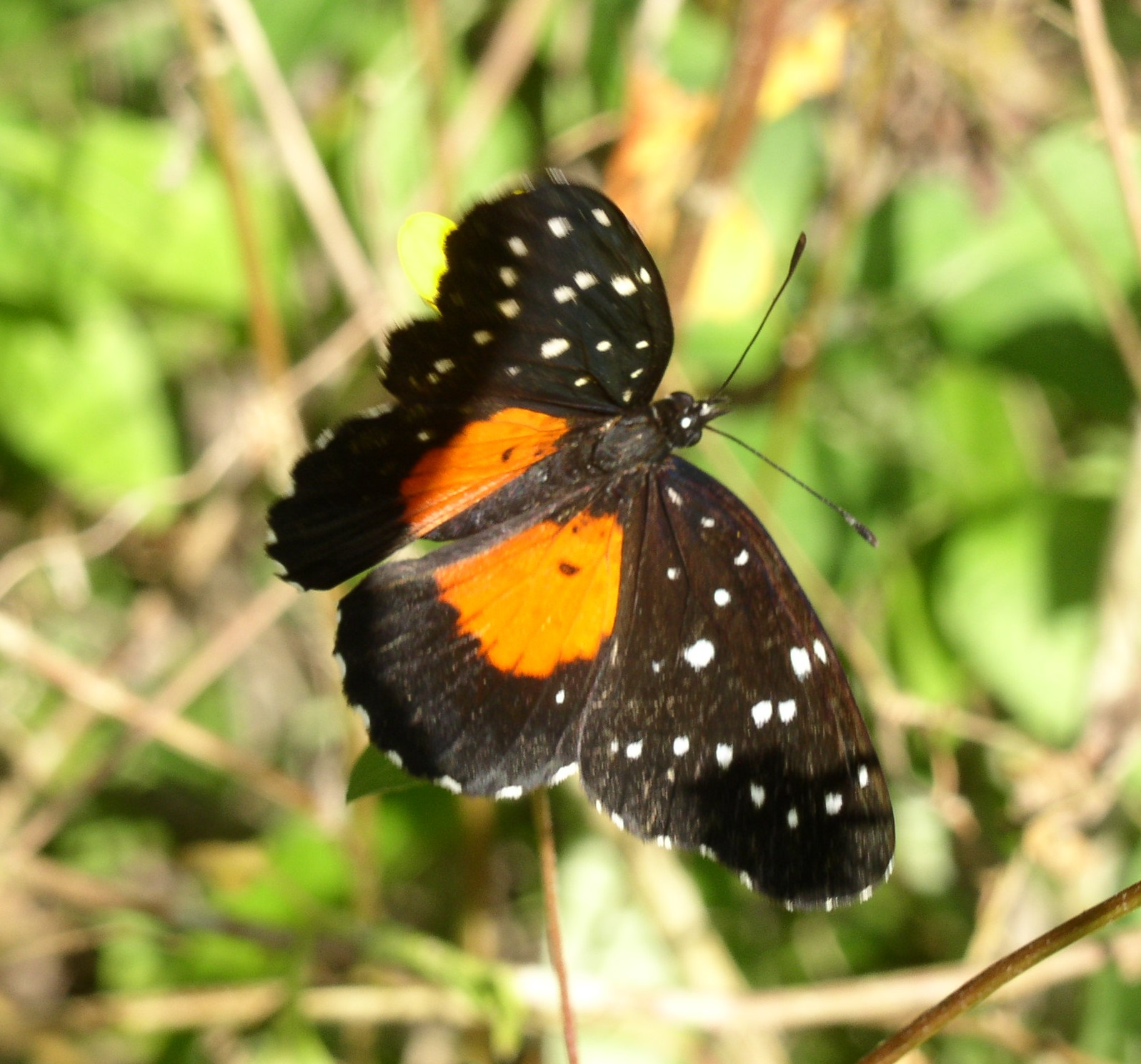
Imago at Campeche, Mexico

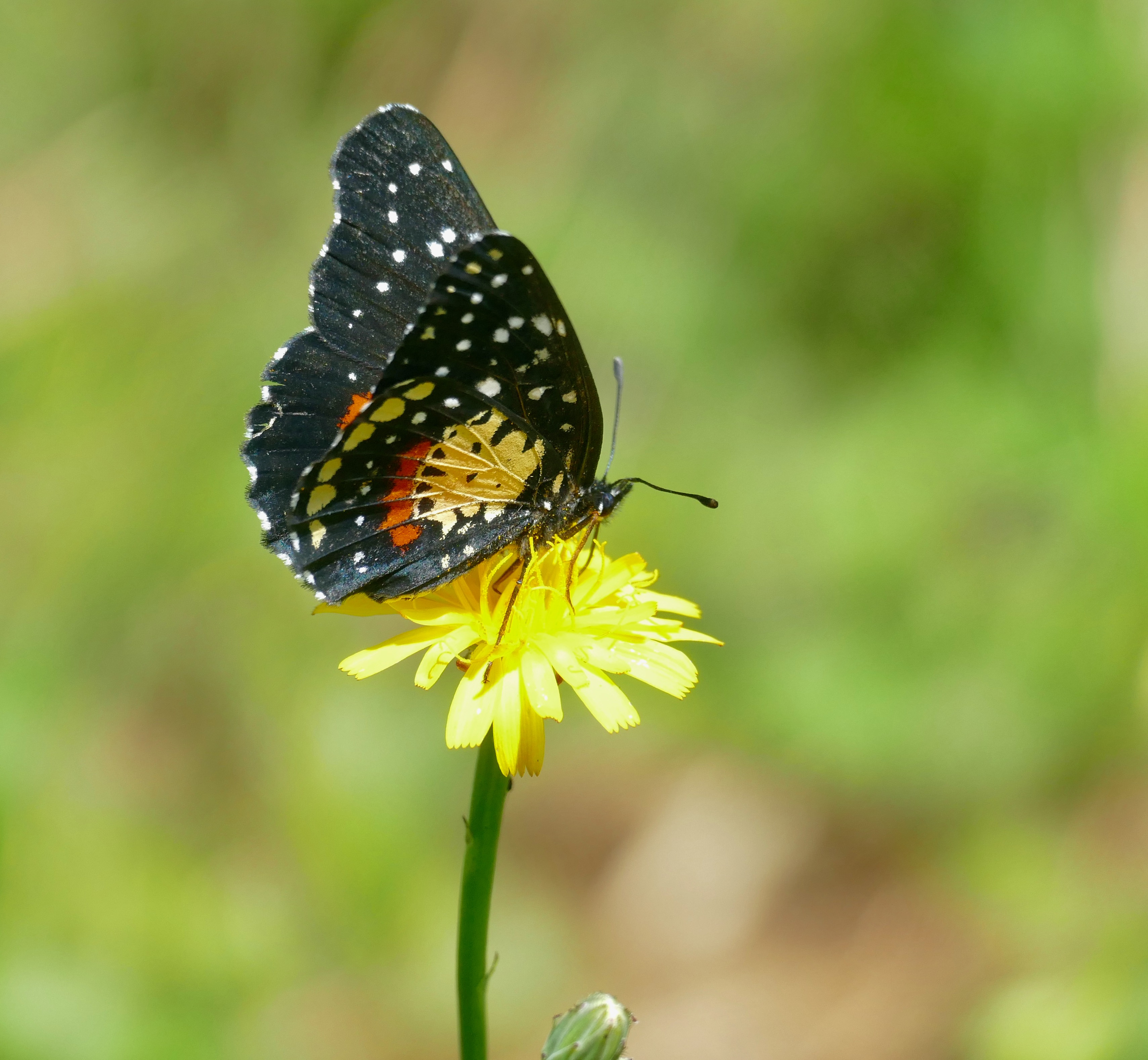
Wing undersides, Costa Rica

Adults inhabit the periphery of lowland tropical to subtropical forests, fields, and along streams, where they feed on flower nectar. Reproduction is continuous in the tropics, whereas in temperate areas several broods are produced from July to November. The caterpillars are grey white to green with several transverse rows of fleshly black spines; they feed primarily on acanthus shrubs, especially Anisacanthus wrightii and Odontonema callistachus (in Texas), upon which adult females lay their eggs.

The crimson patch can reach high numbers in the Rio Grande Valley, but the population is periodically killed off by cold snaps; the area is then recolonized by members of the Mexican population. A very similar species is the rosita patch (C. rosita), which is distinguished from the crimson patch by the former's lack of spots on the wing margins.
