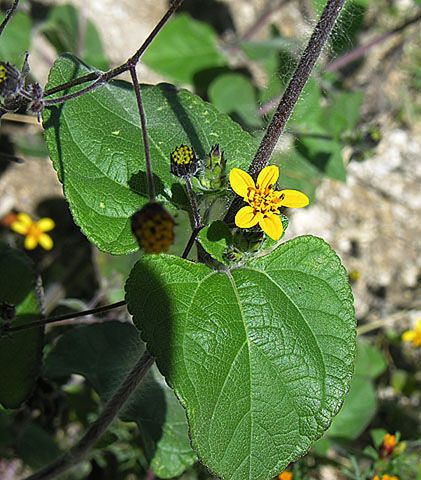
- Baltimora recta

Scientific classification
- Kingdom: Plantae
- Clade: Tracheophytes
- Clade: Angiosperms
- Clade: Eudicots
- Clade: Asterids
- Order: Asterales
- Family: Asteraceae
- Subfamily: Asteroideae
- Tribe: Heliantheae
- Subtribe: Ecliptinae
- Genus: Baltimora; L.

Type species
- Baltimora recta L.

Synonyms
- Fougeria Moench (1802); Fougerouxia Cass. (1829); Scolopospermum Hemsl. (1830); Chrysogonum sect. Baltimora (L.) Baill.; Timanthea Salisb.

= Baltimora (plant) =

Genus of flowering plants

Baltimora is a genus of flowering plants in the family Asteraceae.

Species

- Baltimora geminata - Mexico, Central America, West Indies, South America
- Baltimora recta - beautyhead - Mexico, Central America, South America
