= USCS Baltimore =

History

United States
- Name: Baltimore
- Acquired: 1851
- Commissioned: 1851
- Decommissioned: 1858

General characteristics
- Type: Survey ship (schooner)
- Tonnage: 114 tons
- Propulsion: Sails
- Sail plan: Schooner-rigged

USCS Baltimore was a schooner that served as a survey ship in the United States Coast Survey from 1851 to 1858.

The Coast Survey acquired Baltimore in 1851 for the use of the hydrographic surveying party of Richard D. Cutts while it was working on the central California coast. She spent her career operating along the United States West Coast and was retired in 1858.
