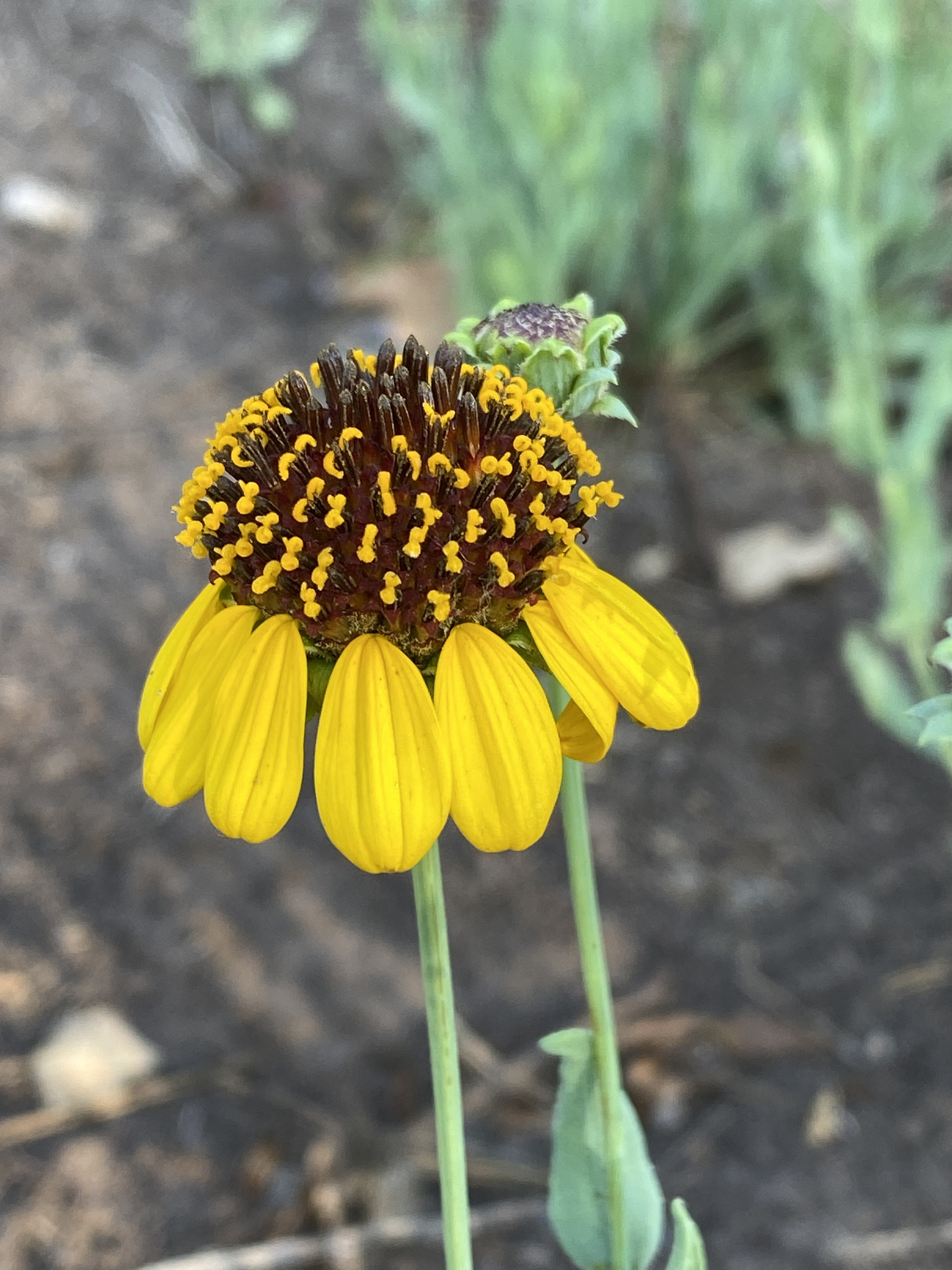

Conservation status
- Secure (NatureServe)

Scientific classification
- Kingdom: Plantae
- Clade: Tracheophytes
- Clade: Angiosperms
- Clade: Eudicots
- Clade: Asterids
- Order: Asterales
- Family: Asteraceae
- Genus: Helianthus
- Species: H. ciliaris

Binomial name
- Helianthus ciliaris DC.

= Helianthus ciliaris =

Species of sunflower

Helianthus ciliaris is a species of sunflower known by the common names Texas blueweed and yerba parda.

Helianthus ciliaris grows in much of the south-central and southwestern United States (from Texas north to Kansas and west to California) and northern Mexico (from Tamaulipas west to Sonora and south to Durango and San Luis Potosí), but it can be found elsewhere in North America where it is an introduced species and often a noxious weed. It is weedy even in much of its native range, growing readily in disturbed areas, on cultivated land, and along the roadside. It grows well in moist areas such as drainage ditches.

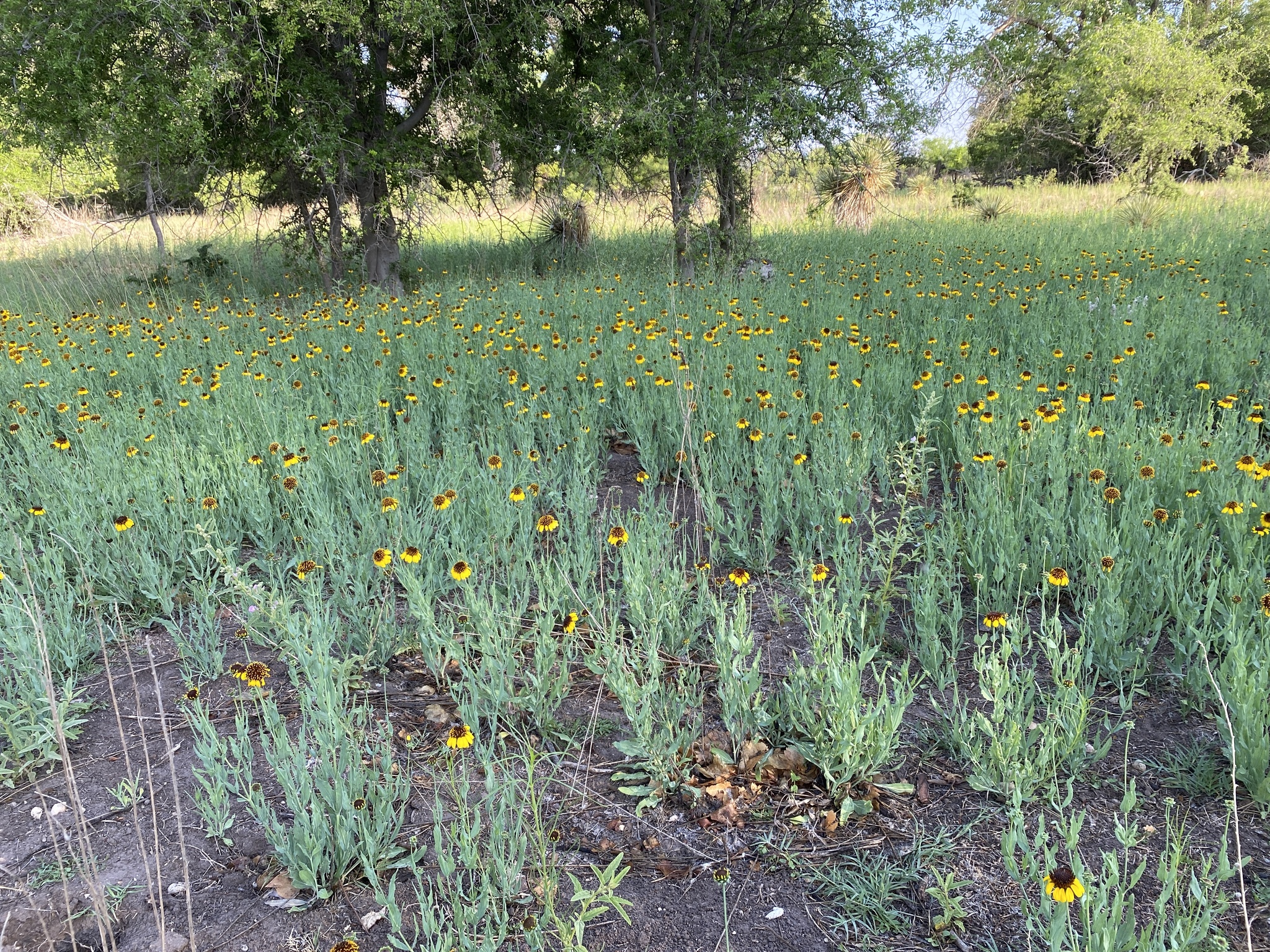
Helianthus ciliaris in Carlsbad Caverns National Park, New Mexico

Helianthus ciliaris is a perennial herb with distinctive blue-green foliage growing to heights of 40 to 70 centimeters (16-28 inches). It has a tough, horizontally spreading root system which sprouts new plants at distances from the parent, and can also sprout after being fragmented, so plowing the plant under can actually help it spread. The leaves are variable in size, shape, and arrangement, but are generally narrowly lance-shaped and wavy with rough hairs along the edges. The inflorescence holds a mass of at least 35 yellow-tipped red disc florets often surrounded by a fringe of 10-18 curling yellow ray florets, although some heads lack ray florets.
