= Statewide opinion polling for the 2028 Republican Party presidential primaries =

2028 Republican Party presidential primaries statewide polling
- TBD

Leading presidential candidate by state or district, based on opinion polls. This map only represents polling data, it is not a prediction for the election.
JD Vance
Marco Rubio
No polls conducted
Incumbent Republican nominee
Donald Trump

This is a list of statewide public opinion polls that were conducted relating to the Republican primaries for the 2028 United States presidential election. The persons named in the polls are people who have expressed interest or have received media speculation about their possible candidacy.

== California primary ==
Poll source	Date(s) administered	Sample size (Note: Key: A – all adults RV – registered voters LV – likely voters V – unclear)	Ted Cruz	Ron DeSantis	Nikki Haley	Robert F. Kennedy Jr.	Marco Rubio	JD Vance	Other	Undecided
UC Berkeley Citrin Center/TrueDot/Politico	February 25 – March 3, 2026	362 (LV)	3%	4%	3%	—	15%	43%	17% (Note: Kristi Noem with 4%, Vivek Ramaswamy with 3%, Tucker Carlson with 3%, Josh Hawley with 2%, Tim Scott with 2%, Glenn Youngkin with 1%, Mike Pompeo with 1%, Sarah Huckabee Sanders with 1%)	13%
Emerson College/Nexstar Media (Note: Poll sponsored by Inside California Politics)	December 1–2, 2025	339 (LV)	2.2%	5.7%	3.1%	10.2%	11.2%	51.8%	4% (Note: Vivek Ramaswamy with 1.6%, Marjorie Taylor Greene with 1.3%, Kristi Noem with 0.6%, "Someone else" with 0.5%)	11.8%
Emerson College	August 4–5, 2025	221 (LV)	6.4%	8.8%	4.6%	9.9%	4.2%	39.6%	10% (Note: Vivek Ramaswamy with 3.9%, Kristi Noem with 2.4%, Tulsi Gabbard with 1.5%, Brian Kemp with 0.9%, Scott Bessent with 0.5%, Glenn Youngkin with 0.3%, "Someone else" with 0.4%)	16.5%

== Florida primary ==
Poll source	Date(s) administered	Sample size	Ted Cruz	Ron DeSantis	Robert F. Kennedy Jr.	Marco Rubio	JD Vance	Others	Undecided
Big Data Poll (Note: Poll funded by the crowdsourced Public Polling Project)	October 26–30, 2026	376 (LV)	6.5%	4.8%	6.7%	16%	40.6%	15.9% (Note: Tulsi Gabbard with 3.2%, Rand Paul with 2.3%, Glenn Youngkin with 2.1%, Steve Bannon with 1.9%, Nikki Haley with 1.9%, Brian Kemp with 1.8%, Tucker Carlson with 1.1%, "Someone else" with 1.6%)	9.5%
Quantus Insights (Note: Poll sponsored by America First Insight (R))	July 27–29, 2026	635 (LV)	0.9%	12.9%	—	42%	24.2%	9.2% (Note: John Kennedy with 1.5%, Nikki Haley with 1.4%, Rand Paul with 1.4%, "Another candidate" with 4.9%)	10.7%
Change Research (Note: Poll sponsored by Freedom Project USA)	May 13–16, 2026	951 (RV)	—	19%	—	33%	32%	7% (Note: "Someone else" with 7%)	9%
Fabrizio, Lee & Associates (Note: Poll sponsored by Byron Donalds, Republican candidate for Florida governor)	February 26–27, 2025	600 (LV)	—	33%	—	—	47%	—	—

== Georgia primary ==
Poll source	Date(s) administered	Sample size	Ron DeSantis	Brian Kemp	Marco Rubio	Donald Trump Jr. (Note: Trump Jr. has stated he will not contest the election)	JD Vance	Other	Undecided
Big Data Poll	September 21–23, 2026	328 (LV)	12.9%	14.7%	15.6%	–	37.5%	13.7% (Note: Robert Kennedy Jr with 3.8%, Nikki Haley with 2.7%, Ted Cruz with 2.5%, Tucker Carlson with 1.4%, Steve Bannon with 1.3%, Glenn Youngkin with 1.3%, Tulsi Gabbard with 0.3%, Rand Paul with 0.3%, "Someone else" with 0.1%)	5.5%
yes. every kid.	April 22–24, 2026	603 (LV)	6%	–	22%	8%	44%	10% (Note: Robert F. Kennedy Jr. with 2%, Nikki Haley with 1%, Vivek Ramaswamy with 1%, Ted Cruz with 1%, Sarah Huckabee Sanders with 1%, Rand Paul with 1%, Tim Scott with 1%, Glenn Youngkin with 1%, "Someone else/Other" with 1%)	9%
yes. every kid.	July 22–23, 2025	608 (LV)	9%	–	7%	9%	48%	18% (Note: Sarah Huckabee Sanders with 3%, Ted Cruz with 3%, Nikki Haley with 3%, Robert F. Kennedy Jr. with 2%, Vivek Ramaswamy with 2%, Tim Scott with 1%, Rand Paul with 1%, Glenn Youngkin with 1%, "Someone else/Other" with 2%)	12%

== Iowa caucus ==
Poll source	Date(s) administered	Sample size	Ron DeSantis	Nikki Haley	Marco Rubio	JD Vance	Vivek Ramaswamy	Ted Cruz	Other	Undecided
Poll Decision Science (Note: Poll Sponsored by Club for Growth)	April 14–15, 2025	564 (LV)	8%	12%	8%	47%	9%	6%	2% (Note: Glenn Youngkin with 2%)	9%

== Maine primary ==
Poll source	Date(s) administered	Sample size	Ted Cruz	Ron DeSantis	Nikki Haley	Marco Rubio	JD Vance	Other	Undecided
University of New Hampshire	October 16–21, 2025	380 (LV)	3%	11%	4%	4%	60%	3% (Note: Kristi Noem with 2%, Sarah Huckabee Sanders with 1%, Rand Paul with 1%, Tom Cotton with 1%, Glenn Youngkin with 1%, Josh Hawley with 1%, Tulsi Gabbard with 1%, Vivek Ramaswamy with 0%, Tim Scott with 0%, Brian Kemp with 0%, "Other" with 1%)	8%

== Michigan primary ==
Poll source	Date(s) administered	Sample size	Ron DeSantis	Marco Rubio	Donald Trump Jr.	JD Vance	Other	Undecided
Glengariff Group (Note: Poll sponsored by the Detroit Regional Chamber)	April 21–24, 2026	500 (LV)	7.9%	26.7%	2.8%	52.5%	0.8% (Note: Donald Trump (ineligible) with 0.6%, Thomas Massie with 0.2%)	9.3%

== Minnesota primary ==
Poll source	Date(s) administered	Sample size	Ron DeSantis	Nikki Haley	Robert F. Kennedy Jr	Marco Rubio	JD Vance	Other	Undecided
Big Data Poll	September 29–30, 2026	249 (LV)	8.3%	4.5%	4.5%	22.5%	40%	13.9% (Note: Tucker Carlson with 3.7%, Rand Paul with 2.6%, Ted Cruz with 2.5%, Glenn Youngkin with 2.1%, Tulsi Gabbard with 1%, Brian Kemp with 0.8%, Steve Bannon with 0.2%, "Someone else" with 1%)	6%
Minnesota Private Business Council (Note: "Notably, the poll appears to have been conducted without the use of a professional polling firm." (Sprinkel, Alpha News))	June 23–25, 2026	1,601 (LV)	3.8%	–	–	31.4%	47.4%	8.2% (Note: Thomas Massie with 2.5%, Donald Trump Jr. with 1.8%, Tulsi Gabbard with 1.3%, Vivek Ramaswamy with 0.8%, Ted Cruz with 0.6%, Tucker Carlson with 0.6%, Glenn Youngkin with 0.4%, "Would not vote" with 0.2%)	9.5%

== Nevada caucus ==
Poll source	Date(s) administered	Sample size	Ron DeSantis	Vivek Ramaswamy	Marco Rubio	JD Vance	Other	Undecided
Emerson College	November 16–18, 2025	310 (RV)	5.8%	3.6%	6.7%	63.3%	8.7% (Note: Robert F. Kennedy Jr. with 2.2%, Nikki Haley with 1.4%, Ted Cruz with 1.3%, Brian Kemp with 0.1%, "Someone else" with 3.7%)	11.8%

== New Hampshire primary ==
Poll source	Date(s) administered	Sample size	Ron DeSantis	Tulsi Gabbard	Nikki Haley	Rand Paul	Marco Rubio	JD Vance	Other	Undecided
Saint Anselm College	October 19–20, 2026	734 (LV)	5%	—	—	—	38%	38%	8% (Note: Robert F. Kennedy Jr with 4%, Glenn Youngkin with 1%, Ted Cruz with 1%, "Other" with 2%)	11%
Saint Anselm College	August 17–18, 2026	678 (LV)	5%	—	—	—	36%	38%	8% (Note: Robert F. Kennedy Jr with 2%, Ted Cruz with 1%, Glenn Youngkin with 1%, "Other" with 4%)	13%
University of New Hampshire	July 15–20, 2026	573 (LV)	6%	4%	8%	8%	26%	36%	5% (Note: John Kennedy with 2%, Josh Hawley with 1%, Kristi Noem with 1%, Tom Cotton with 0%, Ted Cruz with 0%, Brian Kemp with 0%, Tim Scott with 0%, Glenn Youngkin with 0%, "Another candidate" with 1%)	6%
Saint Anselm College	June 24–25, 2026	739 (RV)	7%	3%	—	—	30%	37%	8% (Note: Glenn Youngkin with 2%, Vivek Ramaswamy with 1%, Ted Cruz with 0%, Robert F Kennedy Jr with 0%, "Other" with 5%)	14%
Praecones Analytica/NH Journal	April 22 – May 13, 2026	350 (RV)	5.1%	—	8.5%	0.3%	10.2%	42.7%	33.3% (Note: Donald Trump Jr. with 15.3%, Robert F Kennedy Jr. with 3.6%, Mike Pence with 3.5%, Ted Cruz with 0.8%, Tucker Carlson with 0.7%, Glenn Youngkin with 0.2%, "Another choice" with 9.2%)	–
Emerson College	March 21–23, 2026	529 (LV)	4.5%	—	6.2%	—	17.7%	42.8%	8.5% (Note: Robert F Kennedy Jr. with 3.1%, Ted Cruz with 2.6%, "Someone else" with 2.8%)	20.3%
Saint Anselm College	March 16–18, 2026	665 (RV)	5%	2%	5%	—	27%	46%	9% (Note: Vivek Ramaswamy with 2%, Ted Cruz with 1%, Glenn Youngkin with 1%, "Other" with 5%)	8%
University of New Hampshire	February 12–16, 2026	664 (LV)	6%	2%	9%	5%	7%	53%	12% (Note: Tim Scott with 3%, Josh Hawley with 1%, Tom Cotton with 0%, Ted Cruz with 0%, Brian Kemp with 0%, Kristi Noem with 0%, Sarah Huckabee Sanders with 0%, Glenn Youngkin with 0%, "Another candidate" with 3%)	9%
Saint Anselm College	November 18–19, 2025	1,000 (LV)	7%	4%	4%	—	9%	57%	8% (Note: Vivek Ramaswamy with 4%, Ted Cruz with 1%, Glenn Youngkin with 1%, "Other" with 2%)	10%
University of New Hampshire	October 16–21, 2025	679 (LV)	3%	8%	9%	4%	5%	51%	7% (Note: Vivek Ramaswamy with 3%, Tim Scott with 1%, Tom Cotton with 1%, Glenn Youngkin with 0%, Kristi Noem with 0%, Brian Kemp with 0%, Ted Cruz with 0%, "Other" with 2%)	8%
Saint Anselm College	August 26–27, 2025	791 (RV)	8%	5%	3%	—	7%	56%	14% (Note: Liz Cheney with 3%, Vivek Ramaswamy with 3%, Robert F Kennedy Jr. with 2%, Ted Cruz with 1%, "Other" with 5%)	7%

== North Carolina primary ==
Poll source	Date(s) administered	Sample size	Ron DeSantis	Nikki Haley	Robert F. Kennedy Jr.	Vivek Ramaswamy	Marco Rubio	JD Vance	Other	Undecided
Big Data Poll	September 27–29, 2026	331 (LV)	9%	5%	10%	–	18%	40%	12% (Note: Ted Cruz with 4%, Rand Paul with 3%, Tucker Carlson with 1%, Tulsi Gabbard with 1%, Glenn Youngkin with 1%, Steven Bannon with 0%, Brian Kemp with 0%, "Someone else" with 2%)	6%
Emerson College	July 28–30, 2025	405 (LV) (Note: Press release states a Republican primary sample size of n=416, but crosstabs consistently show a sample size of n=405)	7.4%	2.7%	5.1%	3%	5.3%	53.3%	8.3% (Note: Ted Cruz with 2.4%, Kristi Noem with 1%, Brian Kemp with 0.8%, Glenn Youngkin with 0.8%, Tulsi Gabbard with 0.5%, Scott Bessent with 0.4%, "Someone else" with 2.4%)	14.8%

== Ohio primary ==
Poll source	Date(s) administered	Sample size	Ron DeSantis	Tulsi Gabbard	Nikki Haley	Robert F. Kennedy Jr	Marco Rubio	JD Vance	Other	Undecided
Big Data Poll	September 26–27, 2026	340 (LV)	6.1%	10.6%	6.2%	7.1%	14.4%	40.7%	14.7% (Note: Steve Bannon with 6.3%, Ted Cruz with 2.4%, Tucker Carlson with 1.7%, Rand Paul with 1.6%, Glenn Youngkin with 1.2%, Brian Kemp with 0.1%, "Someone else" with 1.4%)	0%
Emerson College	August 18–19, 2025	490 (RV)	6.7%	0.8%	4%	2.2%	8.9%	55.4%	11.8% (Note: Vivek Ramaswamy with 6.3%, Brian Kemp with 1.2%, Kristi Noem with 1%, Scott Bessent with 0.9%, Ted Cruz with 0.8%, Glenn Youngkin with 0.7%, "Someone else" with 0.9%)	10.3%

== South Carolina primary ==
Poll source	Date(s) administered	Sample size	Ron DeSantis	Nikki Haley	Marco Rubio	Tim Scott	Donald Trump Jr.	JD Vance	Other	Undecided
First Tuesday Strategies	November 19, 2026	1,675 (RV)	17%	–	47%	–	–	21%	–	–
yes. every kid.	July 18–21, 2025	406 (LV)	6%	12%	4%	5%	8%	46%	11% (Note: Sarah Huckabee Sanders with 2%, Vivek Ramaswamy with 2%, Rand Paul with 2%, Glenn Youngkin with 2%, Robert F. Kennedy Jr with 1%, Ted Cruz with 1%, Kristi Noem with <0.5%, "Someone else/Other" with 2%)	7%

== Tennessee primary ==
Poll source	Date(s) administered	Sample size	Ron DeSantis	Nikki Haley	Marco Rubio	Donald Trump Jr	JD Vance	Other	Undecided
Targoz Market Research (Note: Poll sponsored by the Beacon Center of Tennessee)	August 15–26, 2026	608 (RV)	11%	—	22%	—	56%	1% (Note: "Someone else" with 1%)	10%
Wick.io (Note: Document password (made publicly available): govols) (Note: Poll sponsored by Americans for Prosperity Tennessee)	July 29 – August 1, 2026	600 (LV)	5.6%	3.4%	31.8%	2.8%	39.1%	4.2% (Note: Ted Cruz with 0.1%, "Someone else" with 4.1%)	13%
Spry Strategies	March 6–10, 2025	600 (LV)	7%	—	6%	2.5%	55.2%	2.9% (Note: Vivek Ramaswamy with 1.7%, Tulsi Gabbard with 1.2%)	26%

== Texas primary ==
Poll source	Date(s) administered	Sample size	Tucker Carlson	Ted Cruz	Ron DeSantis	Robert F. Kennedy Jr.	Marco Rubio	Donald Trump Jr.	JD Vance	Other	Undecided
Big Data Poll	September 24–26, 2026	376 (LV)	1.1%	6.5%	4.8%	6.7%	16%	—	40.6%	14.8% (Note: Tulsi Gabbard with 3.2%, Rand Paul with 2.3%, Glenn Youngkin with 2.1%, Steve Bannon with 1.9%, Nikki Haley with 1.9%, Brian Kemp with 1.8%, "Someone else" with 1.6%)	9.5%
Overton Insights (Note: Poll sponsored by the Texas Public Policy Foundation)	August 24–26, 2026	578 (LV)	5.9%	6.5%	11.2%	—	29.5%	4.5%	28.8%	13.6% (Note: "Would not vote" with 13.6%)	—
Emerson College	August 11–12, 2025	491 (RV)	—	8.8%	6.1%	4.9%	5.8%	—	44.6%	13% (Note: Nikki Haley with 4.1%, Vivek Ramaswamy with 2.9%, Glenn Youngkin with 1.5%, Tulsi Gabbard with 1.3%, Kristi Noem 1%, Brian Kemp with 0.7%, Scott Bessent with 0.6%, "Someone else" with 0.9%)	16.7%

== Vermont primary ==
Poll source	Date(s) administered	Sample size	Ron DeSantis	Tulsi Gabbard	Nikki Haley	Sarah Huckabee Sanders	Marco Rubio	JD Vance	Other	Undecided
University of New Hampshire	October 16–21, 2025	186 (LV)	6%	4%	4%	8%	5%	61%	7% (Note: Vivek Ramaswamy with 2%, Tom Cotton with 1%, Rand Paul with 1%, Kristi Noem with 0%, Tim Scott with 0%, Ted Cruz with 0%, Brian Kemp with 0%, "Other" with 3%)	5%

== See also ==
- Nationwide opinion polling for the 2028 Republican Party presidential primaries
- 2028 Republican National Convention

== Notes ==
Polling sponsors
