= Drew Johnson =

American journalist (born 1979)

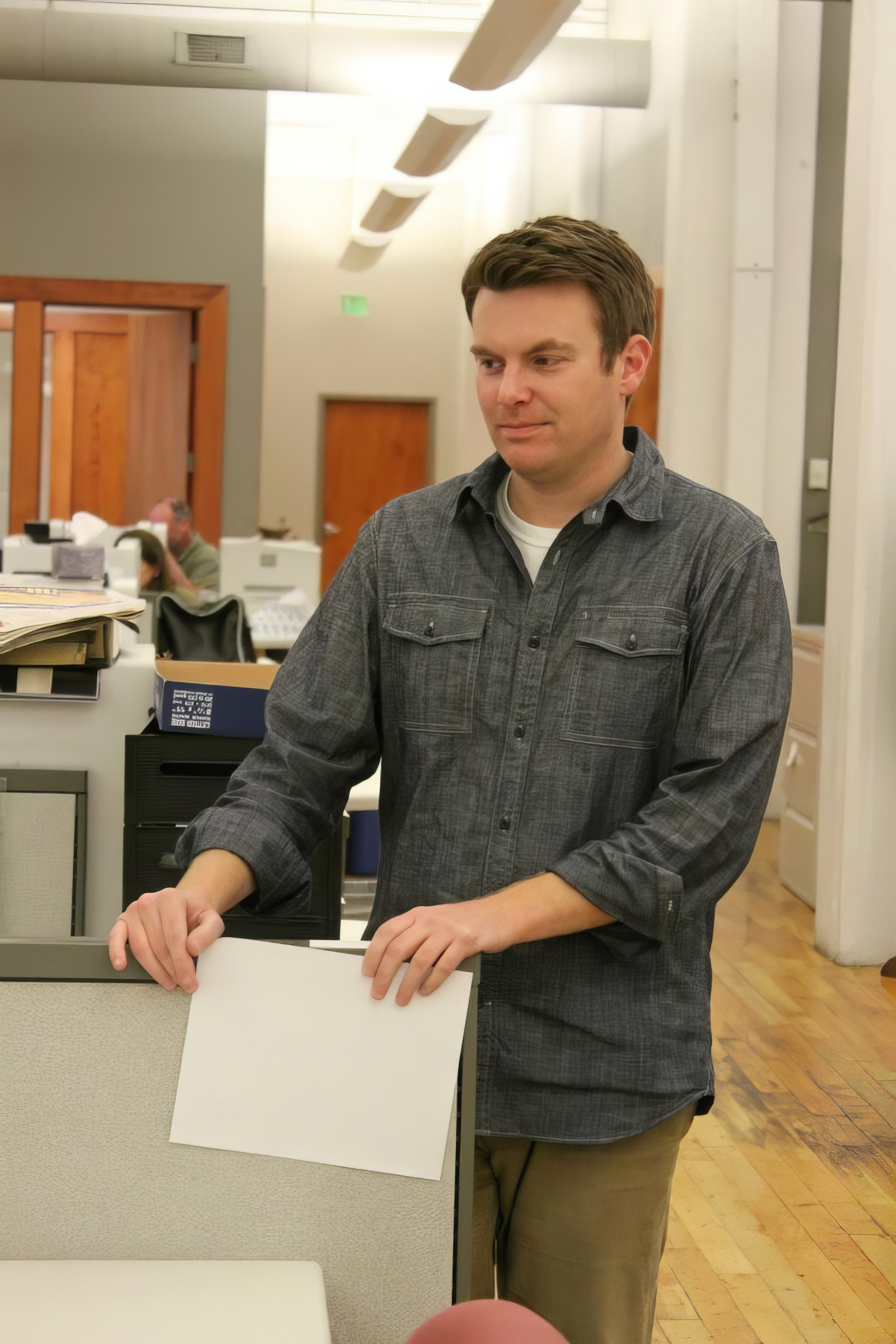
- Born: Jason Andrew Johnson; 1979/1980 (age 46–47); Johnson City, Tennessee, U.S.
- Education: Belmont University (BA); Pepperdine University (MPP)
- Political party: Republican
- Website: Campaign website

Jason Andrew Johnson (born 1979/1980) is an American political columnist, policy analyst, and former think tank founder and executive. He was the Republican nominee for Nevada's 3rd congressional district in the 2024 election. He ran for Nevada State Treasurer in the 2026 election and lost.

Johnson is known as a government waste expert and government watchdog. He writes frequently about tax and budget issues, technology and telecommunications policy, and the environment, and is credited with popularizing the use of investigative journalism by think tanks.

He was the founder and first president of the Tennessee Center for Policy Research, now known as the Beacon Center of Tennessee. He later edited the editorial page of the Chattanooga Times Free Press. He is a former columnist and editorial writer at The Washington Times.

Johnson also worked at the National Taxpayers Union, the Taxpayers Protection Alliance, and the American Enterprise Institute.

He was narrowly defeated in a 2022 bid for the Clark County Commission.

The Nevada Independent called Johnson's result in the 2024 Republican primary "a surprise win" in the four-way race.

== Early life ==
Johnson grew up in Johnson City, Tennessee, and graduated from Science Hill High School in 1997. He was raised by a single mother who worked two jobs. The family lived in a trailer home. He then earned a bachelor's degree in political science from Belmont University and a Master of Public Policy degree from Pepperdine University. Johnson was a Koch Fellow at the Institute for Humane Studies and the American Enterprise Institute. Johnson lived out of his car while starting his career.

== Career ==
=== Tennessee Center for Policy Research ===
Johnson founded the Tennessee Center for Policy Research (TCPR) in 2004. Under his leadership, the organization used the Tennessee Open Records Act of obtain Al Gore's home energy bills the day after the former Vice President won an Academy Award for the climate change documentary An Inconvenient Truth. The records showed that, in 2006, Gore's Belle Meade, Tennessee home consumed nearly 221,000 kWh of electricity—more than 20 times the national average. In 2006, Gore spent an average of $1,359 per month to power the home.

After releasing Al Gore's home energy consumption, Johnson and other TCPR employees received death threats, harassing emails and threatening phone calls from Gore supporters and environmental activists. The Nevada Independent wrote that "Much of his research highlights waste, fraud and abuse in the federal government — he is most famous for using public records to calculate climate champion and former Vice President Al Gore's home energy use in Tennessee."

Johnson left TCPR at the end of 2009. In May 2011, the Taxpayers Protection Alliance announced that he would join that organization as a senior fellow.

=== Chattanooga Times Free Press ===
On July 1, 2012, Johnson joined the Chattanooga Times Free Press as opinion editor for the Free Press editorial page, writing editorials and a weekly column. Under Johnson, the Chattanooga Times Free Press became the largest newspaper in the United States to endorse Libertarian Party presidential candidate Gary Johnson during the 2012 United States presidential election cycle.

On August 1, 2013, the newspaper announced that Johnson was terminated for violating the newspaper's standards in altering an editorial headline to tell Barack Obama to "Take Your Jobs Plan and Shove It," a play on the classic country music song "Take This Job and Shove It." The newspaper stated the alteration was "inappropriate" and that Johnson did not follow normal editing procedures. Johnson later claimed that his firing was a result of the criticizing Chattanooga's electric company, EPB, one of the newspaper's largest advertisers. "When I explained how EPB scammed taxpayers out of hundreds of millions of dollars... EPB pulled its ads from the paper," Johnson said. "I know the paper was frustrated with losing money because I was willing to speak the truth about bad actors in the community."

=== Media and think tanks ===
Johnson then joined The Washington Times as a columnist, editorial writer and author of the newspaper's weekly "Golden Hammer" column, which exposed an egregious example of wasteful spending of tax dollars. Johnson also hosted a weekly "Golden Hammer" television segment based on the column that was available on some Sinclair Broadcast Group stations' local news broadcasts.

In April 2016, Johnson was named National Director of Protect Internet Freedom, a group formed to push back on new net neutrality rules and federal preemption of state laws limiting municipal broadband buildouts. He joined the National Center for Public Policy Research as a senior scholar in 2017.

Johnson again investigated Al Gore's home energy use in a 2017 report written for the National Center for Public Policy Research. According to information obtained through the Nashville Electric Service, energy consumption at Gore's Nashville-area house increased from 2006 to 2017, despite installing 33 solar panels on the home following the initial criticism. In 2017, Gore's home used 21.3 times more energy per month than a typical American household.

In addition to serving as a senior fellow at the National Center for Public Policy Research, Johnson is also a columnist at Newsmax and Townhall.

== Political views ==
Johnson is a libertarian-leaning Republican.

He has opposed the death penalty and the Patriot Act, spoken out against anti-Muslim bias and criticized Republicans for increasing government spending. He has also written in support of free speech, gay marriage and drug legalization.

Johnson endorsed President Trump's 2024 Presidential campaign and caucused for Trump in Nevada. In August 2024, Johnson received Trump's "Complete and Total Endorsement." Trump commended Johnson's "incredible record of success, and strong support from his community."

In June 2024, he told The Nevada Independent if elected he would vote against government funded-abortion services and against a national abortion ban, believing that the Dobbs decision left the issue "appropriately" up to the states.

== Public service ==
Johnson served as commissioner on the Tennessee Commission on Children and Youth from 1997 to 2006, and was named to the Tennessee Advisory Committee to the United States Commission on Civil Rights in 2008.

He currently serves as the public member of the Nevada State Board of Optometry.

== Personal life ==
He is married to marketing consultant and travel blogger Sarah Reeves Johnson and they live in Las Vegas. They moved there in 2015 when seeking a friendly environment to start a small business.

Johnson is credited with starting the Vegas Golden Knights' "Victory Flamingo" tradition, in which fans of the NHL team toss pink plastic flamingos on the ice in celebration of Vegas Golden Knights victories.

== Electoral history ==
2024 Nevada's 3rd congressional district Republican primary results
Party	Candidate	Votes	%
Republican	Drew Johnson	10,519	32.0
Republican	Dan Schwartz	7,351	22.3
Republican	Elizabeth Helgelien	6,784	20.6
Republican	Martin O'Donnell	6,727	20.4
Republican	Steven Schiffman	594	1.8
Republican	Steve London	495	1.5
Republican	Brian Nadell	446	1.4
Total votes		32,916	100.0

2024 Nevada's 3rd congressional district general election
Party	Candidate	Votes	%
Democratic	Susie Lee (incumbent)	191,304	51.4
Republican	Drew Johnson	181,084	48.6
Total votes		372,388	100.0
Democratic hold			
