= List of undercover investigations into animal abuse =

This list consists of investigations into the use of non-human animals by humans, where the investigation was carried out in secret. These types of investigation have been noted to be of significant importance to the animal advocacy movement, and are recognised as an important method in investigative journalism. Undercover investigations into animal use have been found to be viewed as legitimate by the public, suggesting that the findings of these investigations can be important for shaping public views of animal use.

The list is separated by country, and by decade.

== List ==
=== United Kingdom ===
2020–present
Year	Animal type & use	County	Investigated institution	Investigator	Key allegations	Sources
2023	Fish	Loch Fyne	Meall Mhor	Animal Equality	"Drone filming of Meall Mhor, Loch Fyne, in Scotland, a site operated by Bakkafrost, showed buckets of dead salmon being collected in a process known as “lift up”."	
2023	Pigs (meat)	Warwickshire	Bickmarsh Hall Farm	Animal Justice Project		
2022	Cows (dairy)	Carmarthenshire	Madox Farm	Animal Equality	Footage "appeared to show people kicking and punching cows".	
2022	Cows (dairy)	Somerset		Animal Aid	Footage "documents the sad lives of calves separated from their mothers and forced to reside in small hutches".	
2022	Ducks	Lincolnshire	Field Farm	Viva!	Viva! said: “Undercover footage reveals shocking scenes from inside the farm of lame birds dragging themselves over extreta-ridden barn floors using their wings and workers brutally killing ducks by dislocating their necks – a shockingly legal practice – and leaving lame, sick and blind birds to suffer in pain.”	
2022	Chickens (egg)	Gloucestershire, Cumbria, Herefordshire	Happy Egg Company	PETA	"Video footage shows some hens nearly bald or left with bloody wounds, thought to be caused by aggressive behaviour brought on by frustration."	
2022	Goats (dairy)	Yorkshire	Delamere Dairy	Animal Justice Project	"Activists alleged some goats were left lame and unable to walk properly, possibly due to standards of care."	
2022	Pigs (meat) (transport)	East Anglia	Nine farms.	Animal Justice Project	Use of electric goads; kicking and throwing of pigs.	
2021	Cows (dairy)	Shropshire	Oaklands Livestock Centre	Animal Justice Project	"Animal Justice Project said its secret filming at Oaklands Livestock Centre in Shropshire showed the animals being kicked and thrown."	
2021	Cows (dairy)	Northamptonshire	Berryfields fattening farm	Animal Justice Project	"animal rights campaigners obtained footage showing calves being hit, kicked and having their tails twisted".	
2021	Cows (dairy)	Somerset	Bath Soft Cheese	Animal Justice Project	Physical and verbal abuse of animals.	
2021	Fish	Isle of Lewis		Animal Equality	Improper stunning of animals.	
2021	Fish	Scotland		Compassion in World Farming	Widespread sea lice infestations.	
2021	Reptiles (market)	Doncaster	Doncaster Racecourse Reptile Market	World Animal Protection	Improper storage of animals.	
2021	Chickens (meat)	Herefordshire	Haywood Poultry Unit	Viva!	"Severely disabled birds died of thirst, while carcasses were left to rot among the living at the UK's three largest poultry producers, according to an investigation by a vegan charity."	
2021	Chickens (meat)	Somerset	Churchinford Farm	Viva!	"The videos showed birds collapsing because their legs were too weak to hold their “grotesquely overweight” bodies. It meant they could not access food or water points, causing death from starvation or dehydration, it was claimed."	
2021	Chickens (meat)	Derbyshire	Overbrook Farm	Viva!	"Dead birds were left to rot amongst the living while others were covered in their own filth at three of the UK's largest poultry providers, who supply top chains including Asda, Tesco, Lidl, and KFC."	
2021	Pigs (meat)	Aberdeenshire	P&G Sleigh Pig Unit	Animal Equality	"undercover footage shot at P&G Sleigh Pig Unit in Aberdeenshire that showed a worker hammering pigs to death and sows with severe injuries, including organs protruding from their bodies".	
2021	Pigs (meat)	Yorkshire	Willerby Wold Piggeries	Surge	"Disturbing footage showing pigs riddled with disease and dead animals left to rot in overcrowded pens".	
2021	Slaughter	Cheshire	G. & G.B. Hewitt Slaughterhouse		"At Hewitt it filmed cows being beaten with sticks and struck on sensitive areas with electric prods; animals being cut and kicking, apparently still conscious after being stunned too briefly; and a piglet placed in hot water while apparently still alive."	
2021	Turkeys (meat)	Lincolnshire		Viva!	"Dead and injured turkeys were found among living ones at a farm shed housing thousands destined for Christmas dinners, according to a vegan pressure group."	
2020	Chickens (egg)	West Sussex	Kinswood Eggs	Animal Equality	"A battery egg farm has been accused of forcing its caged hens to live in a space smaller than an A4 sheet of paper - in breach of animal welfare laws."	
2020	Fish	Hampshire	Trest Valley Trout Farm	Viva!	"Workers for Test Valley Trout Farming, which runs farms approved by the RSPCA, were filmed throwing live fish and kicking them on the ground as they writhed and gasped. Trout apparently deemed not profitable were dropped on the floor while still alive and left to die."	
2020	Fish	Scotland	Loch Creran	Viva!	Use of hot-water "thermolicer" to remove sea lice from farmed salmon.	
2020	Goats (milk)	Yorkshire	St Helen's	Surge	"The film obtained by animal rights group Surge shows goats being kicked and punched by farm workers."	
2020	Chickens (meat)	Lincolnshire & Nottinghamshire		Animal Equality	"The video claims that the birds are “cruelly deprived of their most basic needs” and hundreds of chickens suffered “agonising deaths each day as workers painfully crush the chickens’ necks in their hands”."	
2020	Chickens (meat)	Lincolnshire & Nottinghamshire		Animal Equality	"The charity claims its investigator found chickens crammed into immensely overcrowded barns, barely able to move or stretch their wings, and deprived of water as drinkers are routinely raised to a height that they are unable to reach."	
2020	Chickens (meat)	Gloucester & Herefordshire		Open Cages	"Some [chickens] were unable to feed properly, some had sores and were covered in faeces. Dead birds were left lying among the flocks."	
2020	Pigs (meat)	Berkshire	Calvesley Farm	Viva!	"One of the most distressing scenes captured by Viva! Campaigns shows a farm worker ‘knocking’ young piglets – killing them by slamming their heads onto the concrete floor."	
2020	Pigs (meat)	Oxfordshire	Whiteshoot Farm	Viva!	"The activists said Whiteshoot, a fattening and finishing centre, had an entire shed of injured and sick animals, some suffering bite marks, and some suffered prolapses as a result of illness or fast growth. They said their footage also showed pigs dumped in a walkway and left in visible pain."	
2020	Pigs (meat)	Leicestershire	Flathouse Farm	Viva!	"Viva said its secret filming at Flat House Farm in Leicestershire, showed sick pigs left to die, sows being brutally killed and cannibalism."	
2020	Slaughter	Norfolk	Gressingham Foods Abattoir	Animal Justice Project	"Hidden cameras filmed workers using live birds to knock off feet from dead birds that had become wedged in the shackle line at the company's slaughterhouse in Redgrave, Suffolk."	
2020	Turkeys (meat)	Norfolk	East Farm	Viva!	Injuries and lack of enrichment.	
2020	Turkeys (meat)	Gloucestershire	Clearwell Farm	Viva!	"Birds were also found to be suffering from respiratory problems, as well as deformed legs and feet, all of these are common issues found in intensively farmed birds due to high levels of ammonia from excrement on the farm floor."	
2020	Turkeys (meat)	Gloucestershire	Strawberry Hill Farm	Viva!	"A number of turkeys at Strawberry Hill Farm were also found with broken wings – one with a gruesome wing bone significantly protruding from the injury. This particular breakage would have been difficult to miss in a ‘welfare check’ and at the time of breakage would have been excruciatingly painful."	

2010-2019
Year	Animal type & use	County	Investigated institution	Investigator	Key allegations	Sources
2019	Cows (dairy)	Buckinghamshire	CJ and GR Carnell farm	Surge	"Film appears to show cows and calves being punched, beaten and dragged across the floor".	
2019	Ducks	Norfolk	Gressingham Farm	Animal Justice Project	"Undercover filming shows ducks stuck on their backs and denied access to open water at Gressingham farms".	
2019	Chickens (meat)	Northamptonshire	Evenley Farm	Animal Equality	"Animal Equality found birds with red-raw skin and dead ones rotting in 'overcrowded' sheds".	
2019	Chickens (meat)	Northamptonshire	Helmdon Farm	Animal Equality	"Animal Equality found birds with red-raw skin and dead ones rotting in 'overcrowded' sheds".	
2019	Chickens (meat)	Northamptonshire	Pimlico Farm	Animal Equality	"Animal Equality found birds with red-raw skin and dead ones rotting in 'overcrowded' sheds".	
2019	Chickens (meat)	Lincolnshire		Animal Equality	"Animal Equality UK said it uncovered "extreme suffering" at three Moy Park farms in Lincolnshire while carrying out a covert investigation. The charity said carcasses were "left to rot for days"."	
2019	Chickens (meat)	Lincolnshire & Devon		Open Cages	"Shocking undercover footage taken at a poultry farm shows chicken carcasses lying among live birds and lame chickens struggling to reach water."	
2019	Chickens (meat)	Suffolk	Free Range Chickens Ltd.	Animal Justice Project	"‘shocking’ abuse of chickens at two farms in Suffolk".	
2019	Chickens (meat)	Essex	Moorah Farm		"Workers have been caught throwing dead chickens at live birds, holding chickens upside down and swinging them into each other by a hidden camera at a farm that supplies major supermarkets."	
2019	Chickens (meat)	Northamptonshire		Surge	"extreme suffering, abuse and cannibalism".	
2019	Slaughter	Wrexham		Animal Equality	"The footage appears to show sheep and lambs beheaded in front of each other and animals becoming trapped in the conveyor belt."	
2019	Slaughter	Northamptonshire	Pastures Poultry	Animal Justice Project	"Christmas turkeys at a free-range farm were plucked while still alive and chickens were put in a scalding hot tank still flapping and struggling, investigators claim."	
2019	Turkeys (meat)	Gloucestershire	Gravel Farm	Viva	"Along with finding "a concerning number of birds" with "disturbing injuries" caused by other birds pecking out their feathers, [Viva!] also said birds were being killed with an "inhumane neck crushing device"."	
2019	Turkeys (meat)	Yorkshire	Catfoss Farm	Surge	"Birds unable to walk, with missing feathers and raw skin in 'bleak picture of life for animals farmed for meat'".	
2018	Cows (dairy)	Somerset		Animal Equality	Aggressive handling and force-feeding of calves.	
2018	Chickens (egg)	Dorset	Walston Poultry Farm - East Down site	Animal Equality	"Hidden camera footage by Animal Equality appears to show birds at Walston Poultry Farm in Blandford, Dorset, with red raw skin living in cages stacked seven tiers high."	
2018	Pigs (meat)	Lincolnshire	Fir Tree pig farm	Animal Equality	"farm-workers kicking pigs in the face and head, jabbing them with pitchforks and laughing as they slammed a gate on to an animal's head".	
2018	Pigs (meat)	Bedfordshire	Rosebury Farm	Animal Equality	"The film which emerged this month also showed dead piglets left on the floor of the shed and larger pigs are shown in seemingly overcrowded pens where they are lying on top of each other."	
2018	Reindeer	Kent	Kent Reindeer Centre	Animal Aid	"Captive reindeer are seen being kicked and abused" in the footage.	
2018	Reindeer	Staffordshire	Blithbury Reindeer Lodge	Animal Aid	"Captive reindeer are seen being kicked and abused" in the footage.	
2018	Reindeer	Flintshire	Cheshire Reindeer Lodge	Animal Aid	"Captive reindeer are seen being kicked and abused" in the footage.	
2018	Slaughter	Devon	PJ Hayman		"Footage shows abattoir workers hitting cows with what appears to be a pipe".	
2018	Turkeys (meat)	Essex		Animal Equality	"Turkeys have been found apparently eating each other alive at an award-winning farm that supplied upmarket ready-meals shop Cook and high-end pub chain Young's."	
2018	Turkeys (meat)	Essex		Animal Defenders International	"Video footage of turkeys being thrown, crushed, kicked and crammed into crates by farm hands".	
2017	Cows (dairy)	Dorset	Grange Dairy	Animal Equality		
2017	Chickens (meat)	west-country		Animal Equality	"The footage shows chicks that the group says had been dead for several days, lame birds attempting to walk, as well as workers reportedly “violently catching and crating birds for transport to the slaughterhouse”."	
2017	Pigs (meat)	Yorkshire	Poplar Pig Farm	Animal Equality	"activists said they found pigs with bleeding wounds on their ears, a “severely lame pig left in a pen with other pigs” and several “heavily” scarred animals. […] Dead pigs were also allegedly left in a yard".	
2017	Pigs (meat)	Norfolk	Hall Farm Pig Unit	Animal Equality	"female pigs were filmed in small cages, which activists said were “sow stalls”."	
2017	Pigs (meat)	Devon	Cross Farm	Animal Equality	"Animal Equality said they found a decomposing dead piglet in a pen with his mother and siblings at Grange Farm."	
2017	Pigs (meat)	Lincolnshire	Grange Farm	Animal Equality	"Animal Equality said they found a decomposing dead piglet in a pen with his mother and siblings at Grange Farm."	
2017	Pigs (meat)	Somerset	Crockway Farms	Viva	"The footage … shows pigs covered in muck. One appears lifeless, and a rat can be seen scurrying around a pen."	
2017	Slaughter	Lancashire		Animal Aid	"sheep were filmed routinely having their throats repeatedly cut, as many as seven times, in contravention of the law, as a result of the slaughterman failing to maintain a surgically sharp knife."	
2017	Slaughter	Kent	Forge Farm Meats	Animal Aid	"animals were allegedly killed without following the correct stunning procedure".	
2017	Slaughter	Sheffield	N Bramall & Sons	Animal Aid	"The distressing footage shows animals fighting for their lives before being stunned to death, frantically trying to escape from pens and also appears to show workers laughing as an animal lies dying on the slaughterhouse floor."	
2016	Cows (dairy)	Somerset	Pyrland Farm	Animal Equality	"cows and calves being punched and kicked."	
2016	Chickens (meat)	Norfolk & Cambridgeshire		PETA	"animals are kept next to CORPSES and packed so tightly they can't spread a wing"	
2016	Pigs (meat)	Yorkshire		Animal Aid	"The footage - almost all of which is too graphic to publish - also shows heaps of dead animals piled on top of one another and a piglet shaking uncontrollably."	
2016	Pigs (meat)	Lincolnshire	Sand House Farm	Animal Equality	"Pigs on a farm in Spalding were found suffering from horrifying, untreated wounds by inspectors, who were forced to euthanise a number of animals in the worst conditions."	
2016	Slaughter	Suffolk			"boiled chickens alive"	
2016	Turkeys (meat)	Essex	Springate Farm	Viva	"According to Viva!, the footage shows young birds pecking at turkey carcasses festering on the floor of tents at Greenbury Poultry Ltd in Essex, on farmland rented from the founder of acclaimed poultry firm Kelly Turkeys."	
2016	Turkeys (meat)	Norfolk	Bernard Matthews	Animal Aid	"The footage shows workers scooping up thousands of dead birds with machinery and putting their bodies into large disposal bins. Investigators claim that biosecurity measures were weak, and that dead birds were dropped on the ground. One worker was allegedly seen kicking the corpses into a bucket."	
2015	Chickens (egg)	Kent	Fridays Ltd	Animal Aid	"In the footage birds are shown suffering from severe feather loss and living in filthy conditions."	
2015	Chickens (meat)	Yorkshire	H Barker & Son Ltd	Animal Aid	"According to Animal Aid, this included birds with missing feathers and sore skin, birds with hock burns and birds “collapsing under their excessive body weight”."	
2015	Chickens (meat)	Dumfriesshire	H Barker & Son Ltd	Animal Aid	"According to Animal Aid, this included birds with missing feathers and sore skin, birds with hock burns and birds “collapsing under their excessive body weight”."	
2015	Chickens (meat)	Yorkshire	Bowland Farm	Animal Aid	"According to Animal Aid, this included birds with missing feathers and sore skin, birds with hock burns and birds “collapsing under their excessive body weight”."	
2015	Pigs (meat)	Yorkshire	Poplar Pig Farm	Viva	"pigs crammed into tiny cages next to abandoned carcasses"	
2015	Slaughter	Yorkshire	Bowood	Animal Aid	"Video footage from animal rights group appears to show sheep being kicked, hacked at and hurled into structures"	
2013	Chickens (meat)	Norfolk	Uphouse Farm	Animal Aid	"bin stuffed with stillborn piglets and a dead adult animal dumped on a floor"	
2012	Pigs (meat)	Norfolk	Harling Farm	Animal Equality	"Animal Equality produced video footage of pigs being kicked, slapped and beaten with iron bars."	
2011	Markets	Carmarthenshire	Carmarthen Market	Viva	"Footage filmed at Carmarthen market on March 30 showed 97% of visitors ignoring signs asking them to dip their boots in a foot bath."	
2011	Markets	Carmarthenshire	Whitland Market	Viva	"no biosecurity measures were in place"	
2011	Markets	Ceredigion	Cardigan Market	Viva	"not a single person dipped their boots" in foot bath despite TB risk.	
2011	Slaughter	Essex	Elmkirk Ltd	Animal Aid	"slaughterhouse staff beating pigs and stubbing out cigarettes on their faces"	
2010	Slaughter	Essex	A&G Barber	Animal Aid	"Undercover footage shows abattoir slaughterman inflicting "appalling" abuse on animals including repeated electric shocks".	
2010	Slaughter	Dorset	Sturminster Newton Abattoir	Animal Aid	Incorrect use of bolt gun.	
2010	Slaughter	Wiltshire	F Drury & Sons	Animal Aid	Incorrect stunning of pigs.	

=== United States ===
2020-present
Year	Animal type & use	State	Investigated institution	Investigator	Key allegations	Sources
2025	Pigs (Meat)	Kansas	Ahold Delhaize	Animal Equality	Dying piglets born prematurely, pigs with open wounds and visible injuries from tight confinement	
2024	Cattle (Dairy)	Arizona	Butterfield and Rainbow Valley Dairies	ARM	Calves kept in temperatures exceeding 135°F, workers punching calves, botched euthanasia.	
2024	Cattle (Beef)	California	Manning Beef LLC	Animal Outlook	Cows butchered while still conscious, workers skinning the faces of moving cows.	
2024	Cattle (Dairy)	California	Grimmius Cattle Company	Direct Action Everywhere	Calves separated from their mothers and killed.	
2023	Pigs (Meat)	California	Smithfield	Direct Action Eveywhere	Pigs screaming while inside CO2 gas chambers.	
2021	Chickens (Eggs)	Pennsylvania	Alderfer Poultry Farm	Animal Outlook	So-called "free-roaming" hens were kept in crowded barns.	
2020	Pigs (Meat)	Iowa	Iowa Select Farms	Direct Action Everywhere	Pigs killed by suffocation and heatstroke.	
