= Taxpayers Protection Alliance =

Advocacy group in Washington D.C.

- Formation: 2011
- Type: Advocacy group
- Headquarters: Washington, D.C.
- President: David Williams
- Website: www.protectingtaxpayers.org

The Taxpayers Protection Alliance is a non-profit advocacy group based in Washington, D.C. The group monitors federal spending and issues reports, research, and analyses on spending and taxation it believes to be in excess.

== History ==
The Taxpayers Protection Alliance (TPA) was founded in 2011 with David Williams as its president (a title he continues to hold as of December 2025). In November of that year, the TPA was one of five taxpayer advocacy groups to sign a letter calling for a 10% reduction in pay for Congress members.

In April 2012, the TPA and other groups called on Republican presidential candidate, Newt Gingrich, to relinquish his Secret Service protection. Gingrich lost his protection the following week. Over the course of 2013 and 2014, the organization issued reports on topics like the public costs of LEED certification. The group also began levying criticism against municipal broadband projects using fiber-optic cables for connectivity.

In September 2015, the TPA issued a report called "Sacking Taxpayers: How NFL Stadium Subsidies Waste Money and Fall Short on Their Promises of Economic Development" which detailed the amount of money spent by taxpayers on publicly subsidized National Football League stadiums. Later that year, the organization issued a report (in conjunction with the Animal Justice Project) on the taxpayer costs associated with scientific experiments that administer narcotics to animals. The TPA also issued criticisms of the United States Postal Service because it was operating in debt. In 2017, the group started a social media campaign to oppose a proposed municipal broadband project in Louisville, Kentucky, claiming that the cost outweighed the benefits.

In July 2018, TPA president David Williams wrote an open letter to the White House that was critical of the Trump administration's issuance of tariffs as part of the United States' ongoing trade war with China. In April 2019, the organization itself wrote a joint letter (with Tariffs Hurt the Heartland) to Treasury Secretary, Steve Mnuchin, condemning the tariffs.

In February 2024, the Taxpayers Protection Alliance (TPA) hosted a counter-conference titled "Good COP / Bad COP" in Panama City, concurrent with the WHO's 10th Conference of the Parties (COP10) to the Framework Convention on Tobacco Control (FCTC). The event aimed to provide a platform for experts and consumers advocating for tobacco harm reduction, countering what TPA described as the WHO's "anti-science agenda" at COP10. The conference featured over 20 experts from more than a dozen countries, focusing on consumer perspectives, policy, and scientific evidence supporting harm reduction strategies.

The Taxpayers Protection Alliance (TPA) participated in the Supreme Court case FDA v. Wages and White Lion Investments, LLC (2025) by filing an amicus curiae brief on October 15, 2024, supporting the respondents. The brief argued that the FDA's denial of marketing applications for flavored e-cigarettes was arbitrary and capricious, potentially harming consumers who rely on these products for harm reduction. TPA emphasized the need for a balanced regulatory approach that considers both public health and consumer choice.

In July 2025, TPA joined 18 other amicus briefs filed in the U.S. Court of Appeals for the Federal Circuit, supporting plaintiffs who challenged the legality of the tariffs. These briefs argued that the tariffs exceeded the president's authority under IEEPA and violated the separation of powers doctrine. The involvement of TPA and other organizations underscores the significant legal and constitutional questions raised by the tariffs.

== Opposition to Robert F. Kennedy Jr. ==
In 2025 and 2026, the Taxpayers Protection Alliance (TPA) actively campaigned against Robert F. Kennedy Jr. in his role as Secretary of Health and Human Services (HHS). TPA publicly urged the U.S. Senate to oppose Kennedy’s confirmation, asserting that his regulatory proposals and past litigation work would harm taxpayers, consumers, and free-market principles. The organization criticized Kennedy’s stances on vaccines, food regulation, and intellectual property rights, arguing that they reflected “pseudo-science” and excessive government intervention in markets.

Following Kennedy’s confirmation, TPA continued its critique with a six-figure, broader public campaign targeted at his policies and leadership. The organization launched outreach efforts including a campaign website and district-level advertising to highlight what it characterized as harmful health policy decisions and misinformation. In October 2025, TPA released survey results it commissioned showing significant public distrust of Kennedy’s performance as HHS Secretary. Citing the poll data, the organization reiterated concerns that Kennedy’s ongoing affiliations with litigation interests and skepticism toward established health policy weakened public confidence.
