= Beacon Center of Tennessee =

American think tank

- Founder: Drew Johnson
- Established: 2004
- Focus: Public policy in Tennessee
- President: Justin Owen
- Chair: John Cerasuolo
- Staff: 14 (2023)
- Budget: Revenue: $2.7 million Expenses: $2.48 million (FYE December 2025)
- Slogan: "Empowering Tennesseans To Reclaim And Protect Their Freedoms"
- Formerly called: Tennessee Center for Policy Research
- Coordinates: 36.1639°N 86.7794°W
- Interactive map of Beacon Center of Tennessee
- Website: Official website

The Beacon Center of Tennessee, formerly the Tennessee Center for Policy Research (TCPR), is a non-profit free-market think tank based in Nashville, Tennessee. The Center's research areas include tax and economic policy, education policy, and healthcare policy. The organization is a member of the State Policy Network.

TCPR supported the repeal of Tennessee's estate tax and has advocated for tort reform and school choice and against civil forfeiture.

== History and overview ==
TCPR was founded in 2004 by Drew Johnson. Johnson left TCPR at the end of 2009. Justin Owen became president in August 2010.

TCPR estimated that its 2008 income would total about $400,000 for the year, roughly double its previous year's finances. The increase from 2007 to 2008 was attributed to publicity from its 2007 report on Al Gore's energy use. The organization received $481,000 in donations in 2012, with contributions totaling $1.2 million in 2013. The Beacon Center receives 54 percent of its funding from foundations, 43 percent from individual donors, 1.5 percent from corporate donations and 1.5 percent from other sources.

In September 2011, the organization announced that it had changed its name to "Beacon Center of Tennessee." In a message to supporters, president Justin Owen indicated that the new name would represent the organization's new mission, "to light the way for freedom and prosperity" in the state.

The Beacon Center is a member of the State Policy Network (SPN), a U.S. network of state-specific free-market oriented think tanks. SPN provides funding, training and other support for its member groups.

== Activities and positions ==
The Beacon Center publicizes its views through publications, press releases, media interviews, and guest columns. Its publications include the annual "Tennessee Pork Report" (co-published with Citizens Against Government Waste) and a Legislators’ Guide to the Issues.

=== Fiscal issues ===
Beacon supports reductions in state government spending and the elimination or reduction of several Tennessee state taxes.

The organization supports an amendment to the Tennessee Constitution to ban a state income tax in order to "quash...attempts to pass such a tax once and for all." In 2014, Tennessee citizens voted for a constitutional amendment to ban a state income tax. In 2012, the Beacon Center was involved in repealing Tennessee's Death tax.

Beacon has advocated reducing or eliminating Tennessee's sales taxes on groceries, cigarettes, and gasoline.

In 2011, TCPR opposed a proposal to extend unemployment insurance benefits from a maximum of 79 weeks to a maximum of 99 weeks.

The Beacon Center and the Tennessee branch of the American Civil Liberties Union have worked together to try to end civil forfeiture in Tennessee.

=== Health care ===
In January 2015, Tennessee Governor Bill Haslam called a special session in order to expand Medicaid in Tennessee under the Affordable Care Act. The Beacon Center testified before Senate and House committees and took credit for defeating the bill.

Following the defeat of the Medicaid expansion, the Beacon Center advocated for direct primary care, a program in which patients could avoid purchasing health insurance and contract directly with their primary care physicians.

=== Transparency ===
In 2008, the organization accounted for 16 percent of all open records requests to the Tennessee executive branch. On one occasion, TCPR sued the state Department of Finance and Administration over delayed response to an open records request. In 2008, state officials responded to a TCPR open-records request for email messages from the Tennessee Department of Revenue by telling TCPR that it would have to pay $3,201 for each day of email messages it sought.

=== Environment ===
TCPR operated a website entitled "Carnival of Climate Change" which was skeptical of the scientific consensus on climate change. TCPR was one of the most significant organizations and individuals spreading climate disinformation, according to a 2009 report in Mother Jones magazine.

=== Report on Al Gore's house ===
In 2007 TCPR issued a report asserting that Al Gore's residence in the Nashville area used more than 20 times the energy of a typical home in the United States. Reporters who followed up on the allegations found that Gore's house did use more electricity than a typical home, but they also found that it was about 12 times the average for Nashville (20 times not including power from solar panels at the property), pointed out that the building functioned both as a residence and a business office for both Al and Tipper Gore, it was much larger than a typical home, and that Gore made substantial improvements to the home during 2007 that reduced its electricity consumption.
