= Tennessee Commission on Children and Youth =

Tennessee state government agency

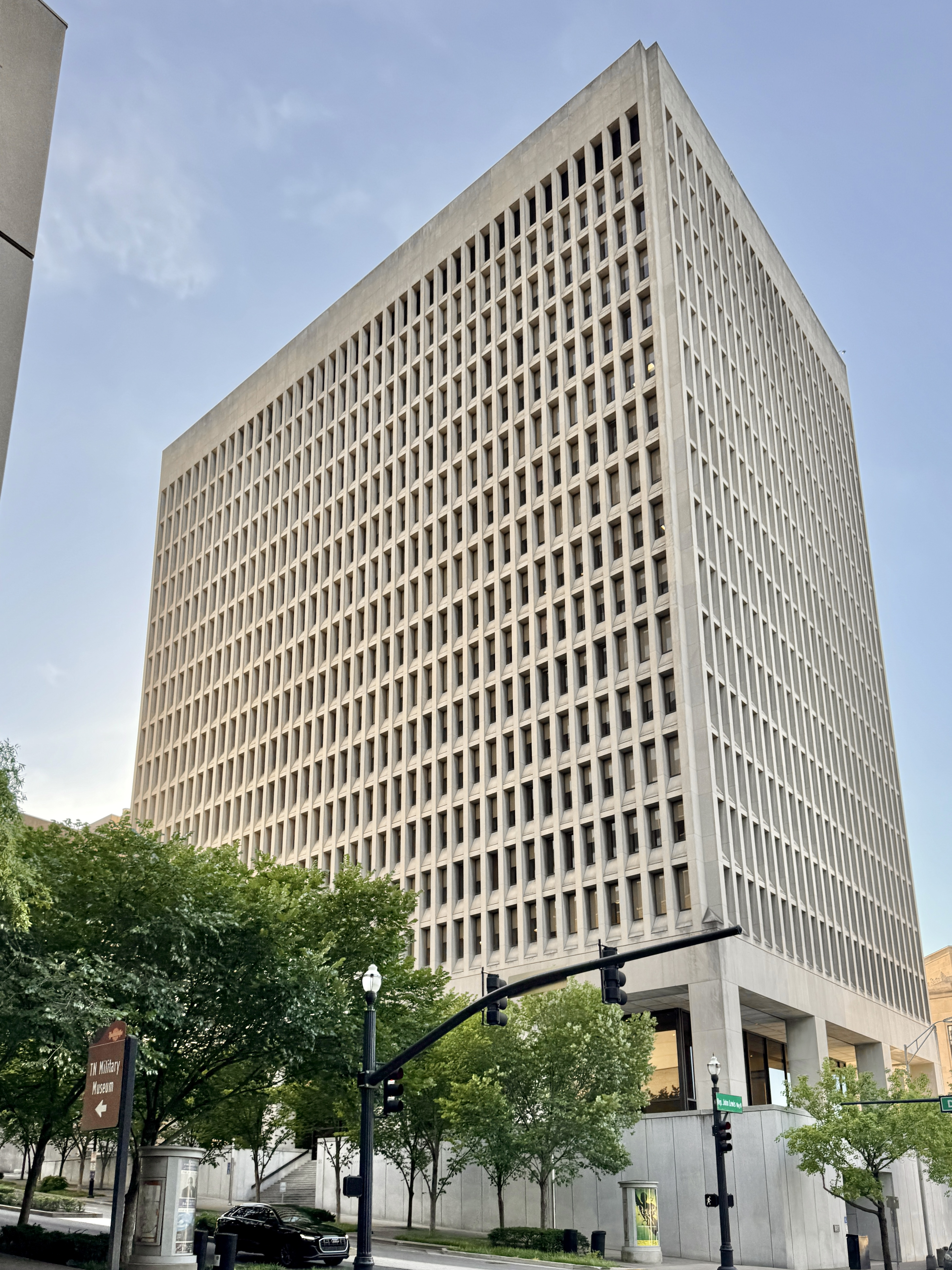
The Tennessee Commission on Children and Youth is located in the Andrew Jackson State Office Building in Nashville.

The Tennessee Commission on Children and Youth (TCCY) is a Tennessee state agency with a primary mission of advocacy for improving the quality of life for Tennessee children and families. The policy-making body of TCCY is a 21-member commission whose members are appointed by the governor. At least one member is appointed from each of Tennessee's nine development districts. Five youth advisory members meet the federally mandated composition required for a state advisory group. The agency has its headquarters on the 9th floor of the Andrew Jackson Tower in Downtown Nashville.

TCCY works with state agencies, juvenile courts, child advocacy groups, interested citizens and other organizations to improve services to children. The commission members, central office staff and regional coordinators are engaged in the following activities:

- Improving the coordination of services for children.
- Collecting and disseminating statistical and programmatic information.
- Informing citizens and organizations of children's issues.
- Tracking legislation and making recommendations to the Governor and Legislature.
- Administering the Federal Juvenile Justice and Delinquency Prevention Act, the Juvenile Accountability Block Grant and other federal and state grant funds for juvenile justice programs.
