= Nationwide opinion polling for the 2028 Republican Party presidential primaries =

This is a list of nationwide public opinion polls that were conducted relating to the Republican primaries for the 2028 United States presidential election. The persons named in the polls are people who have expressed interest or have received media speculation about their possible candidacy.

== Polling aggregation ==
Local regression graph of all polls conducted after the 2024 election

Aggregator	Updated	Ted Cruz	Ron DeSantis	Robert F. Kennedy Jr. (Note: Although Robert F. Kennedy Jr. is registered as Independent, he is often polled with Republicans.)	Marco Rubio	Donald Trump Jr. (Note: Donald Trump Jr. has denied interest in being a candidate.)	JD Vance	Other	Lead
270toWin	September 29, 2026	3.0%	8.7%	5.7%	17.0%	14.0%	36.8%	21.5% (Note: Nikki Haley 4.0%, Tucker Carlson 3.0%, Greg Abbott 2.0%, Marjorie Taylor Greene 2.0%, Vivek Ramaswamy 2.0%, Sarah Huckabee Sanders 1.5%, Josh Hawley 1.5%, Tom Cotton 1.0%, Pete Hegseth 1.0%, Rand Paul 1.0%, Rick Scott 1.0%, Tim Scott 1.0%, Glenn Youngkin 0.5%)	Vance +19.8%
Real Clear Polling	November 20, 2026	2.8%	10.2%	2.7%	35.4%	—	34.0%	6.6% (Note: Nikki Haley 2.3%, Tucker Carlson 3.0%, Glenn Youngkin 1.0%, Brian Kemp 0.5%)	Rubio +1.4%
Average		2.75%	8.1%	5.55%	21.7%	11.9%	37.7%	—	Vance +16.0%

== 2026 ==
Poll source	Date(s) administered	Sample size (Note: Key: A – all adults RV – registered voters LV – likely voters V – unclear)	Ted Cruz	Ron DeSantis	Nikki Haley	Robert F. Kennedy Jr.	Vivek Ramaswamy	Marco Rubio	Donald Trump Jr.	JD Vance	Other	Undecided
Emerson College	November 14–16, 2026	418 (V)	0% (Note: Open-ended survey question)	7%	0%	—	—	36%	0%	20%	24% (Note: Donald Trump 7%, Thomas Massie 7%, Spencer Cox 1%, Other 11%)	12%
Emerson College	November 14–16, 2026	418 (V)	4% (Note: Closed-ended survey question)	9%	3%	1%	—	44%	6%	24%	6% (Note: Tucker Carlson 5%, Glenn Youngkin 1%, "Someone else" 0%)	3%
Echelon Insights	November 12–16, 2026	397 (LV)	1%	12%	—	4%	—	26%	—	40%	9% (Note: Sarah Huckabee Sanders 2%, Tucker Carlson 1%, Marjorie Taylor Greene 1%, John Neely Kennedy 1%, Glenn Youngkin 1%, Rand Paul 1%, Josh Hawley *%, Doug Burgum -, Steve Bannon -, Gregory Bovino -, Brian Kemp -, "Someone else" 2%)	8%
Verasight	November 11–13, 2026	632 (A)	3%	19%	—	—	—	33%	3%	27%	6% (Note: Glenn Youngkin 1%, "None of them" 5%)	8%
The Rainey Center	November 8–12, 2026	406 (LV)	4%	10%	1%	4%	—	24%	7%	36%	9% (Note: Tucker Carlson & Marjorie Taylor Greene with 2%; Scott Jennings, Thomas Massie, Kevin McCarthy, Rand Paul & Mike Pence with 1%; Kelly Ayotte, Steve Bannon, Christ Cristie, Brian Kemp, Sarah Huckabee Sanders, Glenn Youngkin & "Someone else" with 0%)	6%
The Economist/YouGov	November 9–11, 2026	366 (LV)	—	14%	1%	—	—	33%	—	40%	4% (Note: Thomas Massie 1%; "Other" 3%)	—
Rasmussen Reports	November 5–9, 2026	384 (LV)	5%	13%	3%	3%	—	27%	4%	32%	6% (Note: Tulsi Gabbard 1%; "Someone Else" 5%)	8%
Cygnal	November 4–5, 2026	(RV)	2%	14%	—	—	—	34%	—	31%	7% (Note: Tucker Carlson 2%, Glenn Youngkin 2%, Sarah Huckabee Sanders 1%, Marjorie Taylor Greene 1%, Tom Cotton 1%, Brian Kemp 0%)	12%
McLaughlin & Associates	October 30 – November 5, 2026	427 (LV)	3%	7%	4%	—	—	17%	14%	38%	6.9% (Note: Greg Abbott, Josh Hawley & Rand Paul with 2%; Tom Cotton & Sarah Huckabee Sanders with 1%; Spencer Cox, Rick Scott & Lee Zeldin with 0%)	10%
	November 3, 2026	2026 United States elections held.										
AtlasIntel	October 28 – November 1, 2026	3,566 (LV)	1.4%	4.5%	—	—	—	45.6%	2.3%	32.9%	6.9% (Note: Tucker Carlson with 2.7%; Glenn Youngkin & Tim Scott with 1.1%; Tom Cotton with 0.9%; Brian Kemp with 0.5%; Greg Abbott with 0.4%)	6.4%
Clarity Campaign Labs	October 15–21, 2026	413 (LV)	2%	9%	—	5%	—	17%	17%	40%	2% (Note: Tucker Carlson & Pete Hegseth with 1%)	8%
Echelon Insights	October 15–19, 2026	417 (LV)	4%	12%	—	2%	0%	20%	7%	38%	7% (Note: Josh Hawley with 2%; Tucker Carlson, Marjorie Taylor Greene, Sarah Huckabee Sanders, Tim Scott & "Someone else" with 1%; John Kennedy & Kristi Noem with >0.5%; Steven Bannon, Greg Bovino, Doug Burgum & Glenn Youngkin with 0%)	10%
Noble Predictive Insights/The Center Square	October 5–7, 2026	1,137 (RV)	5%	8%	3%	—	2%	18%	—	44%	13% (Note: Greg Abbott with 3%; Josh Hawley, Tim Scott & Glenn Youngkin with 2%; Kristi Noem, Rand Paul, Mike Pompeo & "Someone else" with 1%; Katie Britt with 0%)	10%
Focaldata/Financial Times	October 2–5, 2026	803 (LV)	2%	9%	—	4%	1%	24%	7%	38%	1% (Note: Tucker Carlson with 1%)	12%
Harvard Harris	September 26–28, 2026	(RV)	—	—	5%	9%	—	17%	24%	39%	8% (Note: Tucker Carlson with 5%; "Someone else" with 3%)	—
McLaughlin & Associates	September 16–22, 2026	430 (LV)	3%	6%	3%	—	2%	15%	14%	35%	9% (Note: Greg Abbott & Sarah Huckabee Sanders with 2%; Tom Cotton, Josh Hawley, Rand Paul, Rick Scott & Tim Scott with 1%; Spencer Cox, Tulsi Gabbard, Kristi Noem, Glenn Youngkin & Lee Zeldin with 0%)	12%
Echelon Insights	September 17–21, 2026	424 (LV)	3%	8%	—	3%	2%	20%	6%	38%	11% (Note: Tucker Carlson, Josh Hawley Marjorie Taylor Greene & "Someone else" with 2%; Sarah Huckabee Sanders, Tim Scott & Glenn Youngkin with 1%; Greg Bovino with >1%; Steve Bannon, Doug Burgum & Kristi Noem with 0%)	10%
Clarity Campaign Labs	September 11–16, 2026	406 (LV)	3%	12%	—	5%	—	16%	12%	35%	3% (Note: Tucker Carlson with 2%; Pete Hegseth with 1%)	13%
Big Data Poll	September 13–15, 2026	1,110 (LV)	4%	8%	6%	6%	—	16%	—	38%	10% (Note: "Someone else", Tucker Carlson & Rand Paul with 2%; Steven Bannon, Tulsi Gabbard, Brian Kemp & Glenn Youngkin with 1%)	11%
Focaldata	August 28 – September 2, 2026	662 (LV)	4%	9%	—	4%	2%	21%	7%	43%	1% (Note: Tucker Carlson with 1%)	8%
Bowling Green State University/YouGov	August 25 – September 1, 2026	499 (LV)	3%	7%	1%	2%	—	21%	8%	44%	16% (Note: "Someone else" with 9%; Tucker Carlson & Robert F. Kennedy Jr. with 2%; Josh Hawley, Rand Paul & Eric Trump with 1%)	—
Quantus Insights	August 26–28, 2026	473 (LV)	—	6%	—	—	—	29%	9%	41%	4% (Note: "Would not vote Republican" with 3%; "Someone else" with 1%; Tucker Carlson with 0%)	10%
McLaughlin & Associates	August 18–24, 2026	433 (LV)	2%	6%	5%	—	3%	12%	19%	32%	13% (Note: Tom Cotton & Kristi Noem with 2%; Greg Abbott, Spencer Cox, Tulsi Gabbard, Josh Hawley, Rand Paul, Rick Scott, Tim Scott, Glenn Youngkin & Lee Zeldin with 1%; Sarah Huckabee Sanders with 0%)	9%
Focal Data	August 7–11, 2026	874 (A)	3%	8%	—	6%	3%	18%	10%	42%	—	10%
Emerson College	July 19–20, 2026	—	—	5%	—	—	—	38%	5%	39%	9%	—
Echelon Insights	July 9–13, 2026	1,004 (LV)	2%	9%	—	3%	3%	15%	8%	38%	8% (Note: Tucker Carlson 2%, Sarah Huckabee Sanders 2%, Marjorie Taylor Greene 1%, Josh Hawley 1%, Tim Scott 1%, Someone else 1%)	13%
Harvard Harris	July 11–12, 2026	1,776 (RV)	—	—	6%	6%	—	22%	18%	42%	7% (Note: Tucker Carlson 3%, Someone else 4%)	—
YouGov	July 8–10, 2026	369 (A)	2%	4%	2%	1%	2%	19%	11%	32%	7% (Note: Tucker Carlson, Mike Pence & "Someone else" with 2%; Tulsi Gabbard with 1%; Brian Kemp, Marjorie Taylor Greene, Tim Scott & Glenn Youngkin with 0%)	19%
Quantus Insights	July 3–7, 2026	480 (LV)	4%	9%	3%	—	—	26%	—	42%	—	17%
Zogby	July 1–4, 2026	375 (LV)	5%	13%	—	—	—	13%	—	51%	11% (Note: "Someone else" 4%, Sarah Huckabee Sanders 3%, Marjorie Taylor Greene 3%, Glenn Youngkin 1%)	7%
Focal Data	June 26–30, 2026	727 (LV)	2%	7%	—	5%	2%	18%	9%	40%	4% (Note: Tucker Carlson 2%, Thomas Massie 2%)	12%
Big Data Poll	June 26–28, 2026	1,166 (LV)	5%	8%	4%	7%	—	18%	—	37%	16% (Note: Rand Paul 3%, Brian Kemp 2%, Tucker Carlson 2%, Glenn Youngkin 2%, Steve Bannon 2%, Tulsi Gabbard 2%, Someone else 3%)	10%
JL Partners/Daily Mail	June 24–26, 2026	517 (LV)	6%	9%	2%	—	2%	15%	—	51%	16% (Note: Sarah Huckabee Sanders 2%, Steve Bannon 1%, Tim Scott 1%, Spencer Pratt 1%, Brian Kemp 1%, Glenn Youngkin 1%, Scott Bessent 1%, Marjorie Taylor Greene 1%, None of the above 7%)	—
McLaughlin & Associates	June 17–23, 2026	440 (RV)	3%	5%	3%	—	4%	15%	14%	35%	11% (Note: Rand Paul 2%, Tulsi Gabbard 2%, Josh Hawley 1%, Gregg Abbott 1%, Glenn Youngkin 1%, Tim Scott 1%, Rick Scott 1%, Tom Cotton 1%, Sarah Huckabee Sanders 1%)	12%
Echelon Insights	June 11–14, 2026	418 (LV)	2%	6%	—	3%	3%	15%	7%	42%	9% (Note: Tucker Carlson 3%, Tulsi Gabbard 2%, Steve Bannon 1%, Josh Hawley 1%, Sarah Huckabee Sanders 1%, Someone else 1%)	13%
Echelon Insights	June 5–9, 2026	1,121 (LV)	3%	7%	—	3%	2%	19%	13%	38%	6% (Note: Tucker Carlson 2%, Tulsi Gabbard 1%, Marjorie Taylor Greene 1%, Tim Scott 1%, Someone else 1%)	7%
Noble Predictive Insight	June 1–4, 2026	1046 (RV)	5%	7%	3%	—	3%	17%	—	36%	13% (Note: Tim Scott 2%, Rand Paul 2%, Greg Abbott 2%, Kristi Noem 1%, Mike Pompeo 1%, Josh Hawley 1%, Katie Britt 1%, Someone else 3%)	17%
Focal Data	May 29 – June 1, 2026	667 (A)	3%	9%	—	5%	3%	18%	10%	37%	4% (Note: Thomas Massie 2%, Tucker Carlson 2%)	12%
Harvard Harris	May 29–31, 2026	1,725 (RV)	—	—	—	—	—	21%	21%	45%	12% (Note: Tucker Carlson 5%, Someone else 7%)	—
I&I/TIPP	May 26–28, 2026	561 (RV)	3%	6%	2%	4%	1%	12%	19%	29%	8% (Note: Tucker Carlson 2%, Mike Pence 1%, Greg Abbott 1%, Josh Hawley 1%, Tom Cotton 1%, Glenn Youngkin 1%, Someone else 1%)	15%
Big Data Poll	May 24–27, 2026	1,148 (LV)	3.3%	7.2%	3.8%	5.9%	—	16.1%	—	37.4%	13.4% (Note: Tucker Carlson 2.5%, Tulsi Gabbard 2.3%, Rand Paul 2%, Glenn Youngkin 1.4%, Brian Kemp 1.2%, Steve Bannon 0.7%, Someone else 3.3%)	13.1%
Emerson College	May 24–25, 2026	432 (LV)	0.7%	5.4%	4.6%	3.1%	—	34.6%	—	35.5%	1% (Note: Somebody else 1%)	15%
Overton Insights	May 16–20, 2026	509	—	9%	4%	—	—	32%	—	39%	3% (Note: Somebody else 1%)	6%
Daily Mail/JL Partners	May 15–19, 2026	496 (LV)	4%	9%	3%	—	3%	18%	—	47%	16% (Note: Tim Scott 1%, Kristi Noem 1%, Steve Bannon 1%, None of the above 14%)	—
Echelon Insights	May 14–18, 2026	418 (LV)	2%	12%	—	2%	3%	12%	6%	36%	12%	15%
McLaughlin & Associates	May 12–18, 2026	431 (LV)	—	6%	5%	—	2%	15%	13%	32%	11% (Note: Greg Abbott 2%, Tulsi Gabbard 2%, Tim Scott 1%, Sarah Huckabee Sanders 1%, Glenn Youngkin 1%, Kristi Noem 1%, Tom Cotton 1%, Josh Hawley 1%, Rick Scott 1%)	17%
Lord Ashcroft Polls	April 28 – May 17, 2026	3804 (A)	3%	7%	—	5%	—	13%	22%	32%	3% (Note: Tucker Carlson 2%, Josh Hawley 1%)	—
AtlasIntel	May 4–7, 2026	2,069 (A)	—	11.2%	—	—	1.4%	45.4%	0.4%	29.6%	13% (Note: Greg Abbott 0.7%, Tim Scott 0.7%, Brian Kemp 0.4%, None of the above 10.3%)	—
Verasight	April 21–23, 2026	802 (A)	1.9%	7.1%	3.8%	—	2.7%	15.8%	13.3%	36.7%	10% (Note: Sarah Huckabee Sanders 2.9%, Tucker Carlson 2.4%, Josh Hawley 1.3%, Glenn Youngkin 1.0% Tom Cotton 0.8% Tulsi Gabbard 0.5%, Someone else 1.1%)	8.5%
Echelon Insights	April 17–20, 2026	409 (RV)	1%	8%	—	2%	2%	14%	10%	42%	9% (Note: Tulsi Gabbard 2%, Glenn Youngkin 1%, Steve Bannon 1%, Tucker Carlson 1%, Marjorie Taylor Greene 1%, Sarah Huckabee Sanders 1%, Tim Scott 1%, Kristi Noem *%, Someone else 1%)	13%
McLaughlin & Associates	April 8–15, 2026	457 (RV)	—	7%	—	—	—	15%	13%	35%	8%	—
Rasmussen Reports	April 9–13, 2026	385 (LV)	—	7%	—	—	—	20%	—	47%	8%	—
YouGov	April 8–13, 2026	968 (RV)	—	6%	—	—	—	15%	13%	36%	8%	—
Harvard Harris	March 25–26, 2026	—	—	10%	—	—	—	17%	20%	42%	8%	—
Harvard Harris	February 25–26, 2026	1,999 (RV)	—	8%	—	—	—	14%	27%	43%	8% (Note: Someone else 5%, Tucker Carlson 3%)	—
Echelon Insights	February 19–23, 2026	429 (LV)	3%	8%	3%	3%	3%	11%	14%	37%	11% (Note: Tucker Carlson 2%, Marjorie Taylor Greene 2%, Tim Scott 2%, Tulsi Gabbard 1%, Kristi Noem 1%, Sarah Huckabee Sanders 1%, Glenn Youngkin 1%, Josh Hawley *%, Steve Bannon *%, Doug Burgum 0%, Someone else 1%)	8%
Emerson College	February 21–22, 2026	454 (LV)	1%	6%	3%	4%	—	20%	—	52%	—	11%
Echelon Insights	February 19–23, 2026	429 (LV)	3%	8%	3%	3%	3%	11%	14%	37%	11% (Note: Tucker Carlson 2%, Marjorie Taylor Greene 2%, Tim Scott 2%, Tulsi Gabbard 1%, Kristi Noem 1%, Sarah Huckabee Sanders 1%, Glenn Youngkin 1%, Josh Hawley *%, Steve Bannon *%, Doug Burgum 0%, Someone else 1%)	8%
YouGov/BGSU	February 13–18, 2026	463 (RV)	2%	9%	2%	2%	—	15%	8%	51%	11% (Note: Someone else 7%, Tucker Carlson 1%, Josh Hawley 1%, Rand Paul 1%, Eric Trump 1%, Tulsi Gabbard 0%)	—
Focaldata	February 10, 2026	1,148 (RV)	3%	8%	3%	6%	4%	9%	14%	52%	1% (Note: Josh Hawley 1%, Glenn Youngkin 0%)	—
Harvard Harris	January 28–29, 2026	2,000 (RV)	—	—	—	—	—	17%	21%	53%	8%	—
I&I/TIPP	January 27–29, 2026	478 (LV)	2%	5%	2%	—	2%	5%	18%	43%	4% (Note: Greg Abbott, 2%, Tom Cotton 1%, Tim Scott, 1%, Kristi Noem 0%, Glenn Youngkin 0%)	—
Echelon Insights	January 22–26, 2026	430 (LV)	1%	7%	5%	4%	3%	6%	12%	40%	9% (Note: Tucker Carlson 2%, Glenn Youngkin 2%, Tulsi Gabbard 1%, Tim Scott 1%, Marjorie Taylor Greene 1%, Sarah Huckabee Sanders 1%, Josh Hawley 1%, Steve Bannon *%, Kristi Noem 0%, Doug Burgum 0%, Someone else *%)	11%
Big Data Poll	January 22–24, 2026	1,306 (RV)	4%	10%	5%	7%	—	7%	—	46%	10% (Note: Tulsi Gabbard 2%, Glenn Youngkin 2%, Someone else 6%)	11%
McLaughlin & Associates	January 21–27, 2026	442 (LV)	—	7%	4%	—	2%	4%	16%	42%	7% (Note: Tulsi Gabbard 2%, S. Huckabee Sanders 1%, Glenn Youngkin 1%, Greg Abbott 1%, Tim Scott 1%, Josh Hawley 1%, Tom Cotton 0%, Spencer Cox 0%, Kristi Noem 0%, Rick Scott 0%, Elise Stefanik *, Larry Hogan*)	16%
YouGov	January 9–14, 2026	2,250 (A)	2%	8%	1%	1%	2%	7%	11%	41%	9% (Note: Mike Pence 3%, Tulsi Gabbard 1%, Glenn Youngkin 1%, Tim Scott 0%, Someone else 4%)	17%
Zogby Analytics	January 1–7, 2026	340 (LV)	3%	9%	—	—	—	8%	—	58%	9% (Note: Sarah Huckabee Sanders 4%, Marjorie Taylor Greene 3%, Glenn Youngkin 2%)	13%

== 2025 ==
Poll source	Date(s) administered	Sample size	Ted Cruz	Ron DeSantis	Nikki Haley	Robert F. Kennedy Jr. (Note: Registered as Independent)	Vivek Ramaswamy	Marco Rubio	Donald Trump (Note: Has expressed an interest in running, but is ineligible per the 22nd Amendment to the Constitution)	Donald Trump Jr.	JD Vance	Other	Undecided
Atlas Intel	December 15–19, 2025	2,315 (A)	—	13.4%	—	—	1.5%	22.6%	—	1.6%	46.7%	14.3% (Note: None of the above 12.1%, Greg Abbott 1.0%, Tom Cotton 0.5%, Brian Kemp 0.4%, Tim Scott 0.2%, Kristi Noem 0.1%)	—
McLaughlin & Associates	December 12–19, 2025	433 (LV)	—	7%	3%	—	2%	6%	—	26%	34%	9% (Note: Greg Abbott 1%, Rick Scott 1%, S. Huckabee Sanders 1%, Glenn Youngkin 1%, Tulsi Gabbard 1%, Kristi Noem 1%, Tim Scott 1%, Spencer Cox 1%, Josh Hawley 1%, Tom Cotton 0%, Elise Stefanik *, Larry Hogan*)	14%
Echelon Insights	December 11–15, 2025	426 (LV)	3%	9%	4%	3%	2%	4%	—	12%	45%	8% (Note: Tulsi Gabbard 3%, Tucker Carlson 1%, Kristi Noem 1%, Tim Scott 1%, Josh Hawley 1%, Marjorie Taylor Greene *%, Sarah Huckabee Sanders *%, Steve Bannon *%, Doug Burgum *%, Glenn Youngkin 0%, Someone else 1%)	9%
Big Data Poll	December 10–12, 2025	1,337 (RV)	5%	8%	5%	6%	—	7%	—	—	45%	11% (Note: Tulsi Gabbard 3%, Glenn Youngkin 2%, Someone else 6%)	14%
McLaughlin & Associates	November 17–24, 2025	439 (LV)	—	6%	6%	—	3%	4%	—	24%	34%	11% (Note: Greg Abbott 2%, Rick Scott 2%, S. Huckabee Sanders 2%, Glenn Youngkin 1%, Tulsi Gabbard 1%, Kristi Noem 1%, Tim Scott 1%, Tom Cotton 1%, Elise Stefanik *, Larry Hogan*)	15%
Echelon Insights	November 13–17, 2025	472 (LV)	2%	10%	5%	5%	2%	8%	—	—	47%	4% (Note: Tulsi Gabbard 1%, Sarah Huckabee Sanders 1%, Glenn Youngkin 1%, Josh Hawley 1%, Doug Burgum *%, Kristi Noem *%, Tim Scott *%, Steve Bannon *%, Someone else 2%)	12%
Yale Youth Poll	October 29 – November 11, 2025	3,426 (RV)	—	6%	5%	3%	—	5%	—	8%	51%	8% (Note: Other 5%, Tucker Carlson 3%)	14%
Morning Consult	November 7–9, 2025	936 (RV)	—	7%	5%	3%	3%	3%	—	19%	42%	—	18%
YouGov	November 6–9, 2025	2,172 (A)	4%	7%	1%	3%	2%	5%	—	13%	42%	5% (Note: Mike Pence 1%, Tulsi Gabbard 1%, Tim Scott 0%, Someone else 3%)	17%
Emerson College	November 3–4, 2025	420 (RV)	—	1.7%	—	—	—	6.1%	7.4%	—	53.6%	5.7% (Note: Someone else 5.7%)	25.4%
Overton Insights	October 27–29, 2025	1,200 (RV)	—	12%	5%	8%	5%	7%	—	22%	34%	—	8%
McLaughlin & Associates	October 21–27, 2025	458 (LV)	—	5%	4%	—	2%	7%	—	20%	38%	10% (Note: Tom Cotton 2%, S. Huckabee Sanders 2%, Tim Scott 2%, Glenn Youngkin 1%, Tulsi Gabbard 1%, Kristi Noem 1%, Greg Abbott 1%, Rick Scott 0%, Elise Stefanik *, Larry Hogan*)	14%
Echelon Insights	October 16–20, 2025	400 (LV)	2%	10%	6%	5%	3%	6%	—	—	46%	4% (Note: Tulsi Gabbard 1%, Tim Scott 1%, Sarah Huckabee Sanders 1%, Steve Bannon 1%, Kristi Noem *%, Josh Hawley *%, Someone else 2%)	15%
J.L. Partners	October 14–15, 2025	1,000 (RV)	4%	7%	5%	—	3%	8%	—	—	40%	7% (Note: Tim Scott 2%, Elise Stefanik 1%, Kristi Noem 1%, Glenn Youngkin 1%, Scott Bessent 1%, Steve Bannon 1%, None of the mentioned 6%)	20%
Noble Predictive Insights	October 2–6, 2025	1,156 (RV)	3%	6%	3%	—	—	4%	—	25%	38%	6% (Note: Sarah Huckabee Sanders 2%, Glenn Youngkin 1%, Tom Cotton 1%, Someone else 2%)	15%
Leger360	September 26–29, 2025	294 (LV)	6%	—	—	—	—	6%	—	—	50%	20% (Note: Sarah Huckabee Sanders 6%, Glenn Youngkin 4%, Tim Scott 2%, Brian Kemp 2%, Rand Paul 1%, Another candidate 4%)	18%
McLaughlin & Associates	September 17–22, 2025	470 (LV)	—	8%	3%	—	2%	5%	—	14%	42%	7% (Note: Tulsi Gabbard 2%, S. Huckabee Sanders 2%, Tim Scott 1%, Kristi Noem 1%, Tom Cotton 1%, Rick Scott 0%, Greg Abbott 0%, Glenn Youngkin 0%, Elise Stefanik *, Larry Hogan*)	19%
Echelon Insights	September 18–22, 2025	467 (LV)	2%	8%	4%	6%	3%	5%	—	—	43%	11% (Note: Tulsi Gabbard 4%, Glenn Youngkin 2%, Sarah Huckabee Sanders 2%, Tim Scott 1%, Steve Bannon *%, Kristi Noem *%, Doug Burgum *%, Someone else 1%)	18%
Atlas Intel	September 12–16, 2025	1,066 (A)	—	16.3%	—	—	5.7%	12.2%	—	1.2%	54.6%	10% (Note: None of the above 7.7%, Tim Scott 1.6%, Brian Kemp 0.3%, Tom Cotton 0.3%, Kristi Noem 0.1%)	—
YouGov	September 5–8, 2025	1,114 (A)	2%	8%	3%	1%	2%	4%	—	10%	44%	6% (Note: Mike Pence 2%, Tulsi Gabbard 1%, Tim Scott 1%, Someone else 2%)	20%
Leger360	August 29–31, 2025	308 (LV)	8%	—	—	—	—	9%	—	—	50%	19% (Note: Sarah Huckabee Sanders 4%, Tim Scott 4%, Rand Paul 2%, Brian Kemp 2%, Glenn Youngkin 1%, Another candidate 6%)	14%
McLauglin & Associates	August 21–26, 2025	457 (RV)	—	10%	3%	—	2%	4%	—	16%	36%	11% (Note: S. Huckabee Sanders 2%, Tulsi Gabbard 2%, Glenn Youngkin 2%, Greg Abbott 2%, Tim Scott 1%, Kristi Noem 1%, Tom Cotton 1%, Rick Scott 1%, Elise Stefanik 0%, Larry Hogan *)	18%
Emerson College	August 25–26, 2025	410 (RV)	2.4%	7.1%	3.8%	4.5%	2.8%	9.4%	—	—	51.7%	7.2% (Note: Brian Kemp 2.2%, Tulsi Gabbard 1.5%, Glenn Youngkin 0.9%, Kristi Noem 0.8%, Someone else 1.9%)	11.1%
Echelon Insights	August 14–18, 2025	441 (LV)	2%	9%	4%	9%	2%	6%	—	—	43%	10% (Note: Sarah Huckabee Sanders 2%, Tulsi Gabbard 2%, Josh Hawley 1%, Kristi Noem 1%, Steve Bannon *%, Glenn Youngkin *%, Tim Scott *%, Doug Burgum *%, Someone else 3%)	15%
Atlas Intel	July 13–18, 2025	1,935 (A)	—	13.2%	—	—	1.8%	9.7%	—	4.6%	57.9%	12.8% (Note: None of the above 7.6%, Tim Scott 2.6%, Kristi Noem 1.4%, Greg Abbott 0.9%, Brian Kemp 0.2%, Tom Cotton 0.2%)	—
Echelon Insights	July 10–14, 2025	463 (LV)	3%	9%	6%	5%	4%	7%	—	—	42%	8% (Note: Sarah Huckabee Sanders 3%, Tim Scott 1%, Tulsi Gabbard 1%, Glenn Youngkin 1%, Steve Bannon 1%, Josh Hawley *%, Kristi Noem *%, Doug Burgum -, Someone else 1%)	16%
McLaughlin & Associates	July 9–14, 2025	459 (LV)	—	8%	4%	—	3%	4%	—	19%	31%	10% (Note: Glenn Youngkin 2%, S. Huckabee Sanders 1%, Tim Scott 1%, Greg Abbott 1%, Rick Scott 1%, Tom Cotton 1%, Elise Stefanik 1%, Tulsi Gabbard 1%, Kristi Noem 0%, Larry Hogan*)	21%
Overton Insights	June 23–26, 2025	444 (RV)	—	11%	7%	4%	3%	9%	—	26%	32%	—	9%
Emerson College	June 24–25, 2025	416 (RV)	<0.5%	9%	2%	5%	1%	12%	—	—	46%	9% (Note: Kristi Noem 2%, Tulsi Gabbard 1%, Glenn Youngkin 1%, Brian Kemp <0.5%, Scott Bessent <0.5%, Someone else 4%)	17%
co/efficient	June 12–16, 2025	1,035 (LV)	—	10%	—	—	6%	5%	24%	—	61%	11% (Note: Other Republican 11%)	9%
McLaughlin & Associates	June 10–15, 2025	455 (LV)	—	6%	4%	—	2%	4%	—	14%	36%	10% (Note: Greg Abbott 2%, Tulsi Gabbard 2%, Kristi Noem 1%, Glenn Youngkin 1%, S. Huckabee Sanders 1%, Tim Scott 1%, Tom Cotton 1%, Rick Scott 1%, Elise Stefanik 0%, Larry Hogan *)	24%
Atlas Intel	May 21–27, 2025	1,044 (A)	—	8%	—	—	5.3%	18.7%	—	8.8%	37.3%	21.8% (Note: Tim Scott 2.2%, Glenn Youngkin 1.1%, Tom Cotton 0.9%, Greg Abbott 0.8%, Brian Kemp 0.7%, Kristi Noem 0.5%, None of the listed 15.6%)	—
McLaughlin & Associates	May 21–26, 2025	457 (LV)	—	5%	4%	—	1%	5%	—	19%	34%	10% (Note: Tulsi Gabbard 2%, Rick Scott 1%, Kristi Noem 1%, S. Huckabee Sanders 1%, Tim Scott 1%, Greg Abbott 1%, Elise Stefanik 1%, Glenn Youngkin 1%)	22%
J.L. Partners	May 13–14, 2025	975 (RV)	6%	8%	5%	—	7%	6%	—	—	46%	9% (Note: Tim Scott 2%, Kristi Noem 2%, Glenn Youngkin 1%, Elise Stefanik 1%, Steve Bannon 1%, Scott Bessent 0%, None of the mentioned 3%)	13%
Echelon Insights	May 8–12, 2025	426 (LV)	4%	7%	8%	6%	5%	4%	—	—	44%	9% (Note: 3% for Glenn Youngkin; 1% for Tulsi Gabbard, Sarah Huckabee Sanders, and Tim Scott; <1% for Steve Bannon, Doug Burgum, Josh Hawley, and Kristi Noem; 1% for "Someone else")	13%
McLaughlin & Associates	April 22–29, 2025	456 (LV)	—	6%	5%	—	2%	2%	—	14%	43%	9% (Note: 2% Sarah Huckabee Sanders, 2% Kristi Noem, 1% Tulsi Gabbard, 1% Glenn Youngkin, 1% Rick Scott, 1% Elise Stefanik, 1% Greg Abbott, 1% Tim Scott)	19%
J.L. Partners (Note: Polling was conducted under the hypothetical pretext of an amendment to the US constitution removing or changing the presidential two term limit, which had been hinted at by some GOP MAGA politicians as well an idea that has also been promoted by President Trump.)	April 23–28, 2025	1,006 (RV)	4%	8%	5%	—	3%	5%	—	—	48%	12% (Note: Scott 2%, Bannon 1%, Youngkin 1%, Noem 1%, Someone else 7%)	14%
J.L. Partners	April 23–28, 2025	1,006 (RV)	2%	6%	4%	—	3%	3%	39%	—	19%	14% (Note: Youngkin 2%, Noem 1%, Bannon 1%, Bessent 1%, Scott 1%, Someone else 8%)	11%
J.L. Partners	April 23–28, 2025	1,006 (RV)	2%	10%	4%	—	5%	3%	—	11%	40%	12% (Note: Youngkin 2%, Scott 1%, Stefanik 1%, Noem 1%, Someone else 7%)	12%
YouGov/ The Times	April 21–23, 2025	1,296 (A)	3%	6%	2%	5%	4%	2%	16%	5%	31%	6% (Note: Tulsi Gabbard 2%, Tucker Carlson 1%, Tim Scott 1%, Someone else 2%)	20%
Atlas Intel	April 10–14, 2025	2,347 (A)	—	9%	—	—	1%	9%	—	—	60%	16% (Note: Kristi Noem 8%, Tucker Carlson 5%, Glenn Youngkin 3%)	6%
Echelon Insights	April 10–14, 2025	1,014 (LV)	1%	9%	4%	7%	5%	4%	—	—	47%	7% (Note: Josh Hawley 1%, Sarah Huckabee Sanders 1%, Kristi Noem 1%, Tulsi Gabbard 1%, Tim Scott 1%, someone else 2%)	16%
Yale Youth Poll	April 1–3, 2025		1%	4%	3%	4%	3%	2%	56%	—	19%	8% (Note: 2% for Tulsi Gabbard; 1% for Steve Bannon, Josh Hawley, Brian Kemp, Tim Scott, and Glenn Youngkin; 3% for "Other")	—
Yale Youth Poll	April 1–3, 2025		3%	8%	4%	9%	4%	3%	—	—	53%	17% (Note: 4% for Tulsi Gabbard, 2% for Josh Hawley, Brian Kemp, and Tim Scott; 1% for Steve Bannon and Marjorie Taylor Greene; <0.5% for Glenn Youngkin; 5% for "Other")	—
YouGov/Economist	March 30 – April 1, 2025	594 (RV)	2%	8%	3%	2%	3%	4%	—	11%	43%	4% (Note: Tim Scott 1%, Tulsi Gabbard 1%, someone else 2%)	20%
Overton Insights	March 24–28, 2025	536 (RV)	–	13%	–	–	6%	6%	—	31%	36%	7% (Note: "I would not vote" with 7%)	–
Echelon Insights	March 10–13, 2025	450 (LV)	5%	7%	7%	7%	3%	4%	—	—	46%	5% (Note: Kristi Noem 2%, Sarah Huckabee Sanders 1%, Glenn Youngkin 1%, Josh Hawley 1%, Tim Scott 1%)	16%
McLaughlin & Associates	February 11–18, 2025	468 (LV)	—	6%	3%	—	4%	3%	—	17%	37%	10% (Note: Tulsi Gabbard and Kristi Noem with 2%; Greg Abbott, Tom Cotton, Larry Hogan, Sarah Huckabee Sanders, Rick Scott, and Tim Scott with 1%; Elise Stefanik and Glenn Youngkin with 0%)	22%
Echelon Insights	February 10–13, 2025	466 LV	4%	10%	8%	—	5%	4%	—	—	39%	10% (Note: Kristi Noem and Sarah Huckabee Sanders with 2%; Doug Burgum, Josh Hawley, Tim Scott, and Glenn Youngkin with 1%; Katie Britt and Elise Stefanik with <1%; "Someone else" with 2%)	20%
McLaughlin & Associates	January 22–27, 2025	453 (LV)	—	8%	2%	—	3%	3%	—	21%	27%	11% (Note: Tulsi Gabbard with 3%; Gregg Abbott & Glenn Youngkin with 2%; Larry Hogan, Kristi Noem, Sarah Huckabee Sanders & Tim Scott with 1%)	24%
	January 20, 2025	Second inauguration of Donald Trump											

== 2024 ==
Poll source	Date(s) administered	Sample size	Ted Cruz	Ron DeSantis	Nikki Haley	Robert F. Kennedy Jr. (Note: Registered as Independent)	Vivek Ramaswamy	Marco Rubio	Donald Trump	Donald Trump Jr.	JD Vance	Other	Undecided
McLaughlin & Associates	December 11–16, 2024	463 (LV)	—	9%	4%	–	4%	2%	—	21%	25%	9% (Note: Tim Scott with 3%; Tulsi Gabbard, Sarah Huckabee Sanders & Glenn Youngkin with 2%; Greg Abbott, Tom Cotton, Kristi Noem & Rick Scott with 1%; Larry Hogan & Elise Stefanik with <1%)	24%
Morning Consult	December 6–8, 2024	994 (RV)	—	9%	6%	5%	5%	1%	—	30%	30%	19% (Note: Greg Abbott, Tucker Carlson, Brian Kemp, Sarah Huckabee Sanders, and Glenn Youngkin with 1%; Someone else with 5%; Would not vote with 4%)	—
Emerson College	November 20–22, 2024	420 (RV)	1%	5%	2%	2%	3%	1%	23%	—	30%	9% (Note: Tulsi Gabbard and Candace Owens with 1%; Elon Musk, and Glenn Youngkin with <1%; Someone else with 5%) (Note: Musk is not eligible to serve as president as he is not a natural-born citizen)	28%
Echelon Insights	November 14–18, 2024	483 (LV)	5%	8%	9%	—	9%	5%	—	—	37%	9% (Note: Sarah Huckabee Sanders with 2%; Josh Hawley, Tim Scott, Glenn Youngkin, and Kristi Noem with 1%; Katie Britt, Doug Burgum, and Elise Stefanik with 0%; Someone else with 3%)	18%
	November 5, 2024	2024 United States presidential election held.											
Echelon Insights	July 19–21, 2024	456 (LV)	4%	14%	9%	—	10%	2%		—	25%	16% (Note: Sarah Huckabee Sanders with 3%; Josh Hawley, and Tim Scott with 2%; Katie Britt, Byron Donalds, and Glenn Youngkin with 1%)	21%
Echelon Insights	January 16–18, 2024	832 (RV)	—	27%	19%	—	18%	—		—	1%	18% (Note: Tucker Carlson with 6%; Greg Abbott with 3%; Kari Lake and Glenn Youngkin with 2%; Tom Cotton, Byron Donalds, Josh Hawley, Brian Kemp, and Elise Stefanik with 1%; Katie Britt with 0%)	17%

== Head-to-head polling ==
=== Vance vs. Rubio ===
Polling firm	Date(s) administered	Sample size					
Polling firm	Date(s) administered	Sample size	JD Vance	Marco Rubio			
Polling firm	Date(s) administered	Sample size	Overton Insights	May 16–20, 2026	1,377 (RV)	36%	42%
Daily Mail/JL Partners	May 15–19, 2026	496 (LV)	58%	30%			

== See also ==
- 2028 Republican National Convention
