= Animal Justice Project =

International pressure group

- Founded: 1 December 2014; 11 years ago
- Purpose: Veganism, animal rights, speciesism, advocacy
- Location: UK
- Origins: United Kingdom
- Method: Advocacy, media, research, outreach, investigations
- Website: animaljusticeproject.com

Animal Justice Project is a British animal rights organisation founded in 2014. The NGO advocates for an end to animal agriculture and promotes a vegan lifestyle, conducting undercover investigations on farms, in abattoirs, and places where animals are traded, through any means necessary, indicating that their mission supersedes current rule of law. The NGO also attempts to draw awareness to its cause with events such as disruption of sales on private property as well as interruption of private meetings at board and stakeholder level, including large organisations such as Tesco.

== Campaigns & Investigation ==
In 2022, activists from the organisation climbed onto the roof of the National Beef Expo at Darlington Farmers Market with 15 metres (49 ft) wide banners. Pictures of the banners reached millions in regional and national press. The rooftop activists were arrested following seven hours of what the group calls its first ‘non-violent direct action’ and Animal Justice Project’s founder, Claire Palmer, said of the day that their aim "is not to be popular, but to advocate for the rights of animals" and that "our message to the agricultural sector, is that there is no future in animal farming".

Other demonstrations have been held by the organisation on high streets, at farms, livestock markets, milk processor Head Offices, and abattoirs, using marketing techniques to highlight their undercover work and campaign for veganism, such as digital ad vans, billboards, print ads, and Vimeo.

Animal Justice Project’s undercover work has had many national media mentions and they appear to use specialised film techniques such as camera installation. Investigations have included the first ever filming of a beef ‘mega-farm’, highlighting in The Times what they claim to be a ‘failure of UK government to prevent abuse and suffering inside UK slaughterhouses, and the failure of CCTV as well as government-appointed veterinarians’, and the secretive trade in bull calves via dealers collecting calves from dairies and livestock markets.
