= Barnes (surname) =

Barnes is an English surname. At the time of the British Census of 1881, the relative frequency of the surname Barnes was highest in Dorset (2.9 times the British average), followed by Wiltshire, Cumberland, Hampshire, Norfolk, Cambridgeshire, Buckinghamshire, Huntingdonshire, Lancashire and Sussex.

There are multiple theories of the origin of the surname; it is variously suggested to be of Anglo-Saxon, Norse, or Irish provenance. According to one etymology, the name is derived from Old English beorn (warrior), which is in turn of Old Norse origin. In another account, it was simply an occupational name for a person who works in a barn, or a topographic name for a person who lives near a barn.

== People ==
=== A ===
- Aaron Barnes (disambiguation)
- Abdullatief Barnes (1941–2022), South African cricketer
- Adairius Barnes (born 1994), American football player
- Adia Barnes (born 1977), American basketball coach
- Alan Barnes (disambiguation)
- Alanson H. Barnes (1817–1890), American judge
- Albert Barnes (disambiguation)
- Alfred Barnes (disambiguation)
- Alex Barnes (born 1996), American footballer
- Alexander Barnes (born 1981), American chemist
- Allan Barnes (1949–2016), American jazz musician
- Ambrose Barnes (1627–1710), English nonconformist
- Andy Barnes (born 1967), English footballer
- Angela Barnes (born 1976), English comedian
- Ann Barnes (1945–2005), American actress
- Annie Barnes (disambiguation)
- Antwan Barnes (born 1984), American football player
- Archie Barnes (born 2006), English actor
- Arthur Barnes (disambiguation)
- Ashley Barnes (born 1989), English footballer
- Austin Barnes (born 1989), American baseball catcher
- Aziza Barnes (1992–2024), American poet, screenwriter, and playwright

=== B ===
- Barnabe Barnes (c. 1571–1609), English poet
- Barry Barnes (disambiguation)
- Ben Barnes (disambiguation)
- Berrick Barnes (born 1986), Australian rugby union coach
- Bert Barnes (footballer) (1890–1964), Australian rules footballer
- Bill Barnes (disambiguation)
- Billy Barnes (disambiguation)
- Binnie Barnes (1903–1998), English actress
- Booba Barnes (1936–1996), American musician
- Bootsie Barnes (1937–2020), American jazz tenor saxophonist
- Brad Barnes (born 1998), Jamaican cricketer
- Bradley Barnes (born 1988), South African cricketer
- Brandon Barnes (disambiguation)
- Brian Barnes (disambiguation)
- Broda Otto Barnes (1906–1988), American physician
- Bryant Barnes (born 2003), American singer-songwriter and musician
- Burton V. Barnes (1930–2014), American botanist

=== C ===
- Cal Barnes (born 1988), American actor
- Carnella Barnes (1911–1997), African-American minister in the Disciples of Christ church
- Carol Barnes (1944–2008), British newsreader and broadcaster
- Carol A. Barnes, American neuroscientist
- Casey Barnes (born 1978), Australian country rock singer-songwriter
- Cassius McDonald Barnes (1845–1925), American politician
- Catharine Weed Barnes (1851–1913), American photographer
- Cayla Barnes (born 1999), American ice hockey player
- Celera Barnes (born 1998), American sprinter
- Charles Barnes (disambiguation)
- Charlotte Mary Sanford Barnes (c. 1818–1863), American actress
- Cheryl Barnes, American singer and actress
- Chester Barnes (1947–2021), English table tennis player
- Chris Barnes (disambiguation)
- Christopher Barnes (disambiguation)
- Clare Barnes Jr. (c. 1907–1992), American writer
- Clarence A. Barnes (1882–1970), American politician
- Clark Barnes (born 1950), American politician
- Claude Barnes, American professor
- Clive Barnes (1927–2008), English theater and dance critic
- Colin Barnes (born 1957), English footballer
- Crispin Barnes (born 1966), English physicist

=== D ===
- Danny Barnes (disambiguation)
- Darian Barnes (born 1980), American football player
- Darrius Barnes (born 1986), American soccer player
- Darryl Barnes (born 1965), American politician
- David Barnes (disambiguation)
- Dee Barnes, American rapper
- Deion Barnes (born 1993), American football player
- Demas Barnes (1827–1888), American politician
- Demore Barnes (born 1976), Canadian actor
- Derrick Barnes (disambiguation)
- Don Barnes, (born 1952), American musician
- Donna Barnes, American politician
- Doug Barnes Jr. (born 1996), American stock car racing driver
- Djuna Barnes (1892–1982), American artist and writer

=== E ===
- Edward Barnes (disambiguation)
- Edwin Barnes (1935–2019), British Anglican bishop turned Catholic priest
- Eileen Barnes (1876–1956), Irish botanical artist
- Eli Barnes, American politician
- Elisabet Barnes (born 1977), Swedish long-distance runner
- Elizabeth Barnes, American philosopher
- Elly-May Barnes, Australian musician
- Emery Barnes (1929–1998), American football player
- Emile Barnes (1892–1970), American jazz clarinetist
- Emre Zafer Barnes (born 1988), Jamaican-born Turkish sprinter
- Eric Barnes (disambiguation)
- Erich Barnes (1935–2022), American football player
- Erik Barnes (born 1987), American golfer
- Ernie or Ernest Barnes (disambiguation)
- Estela Barnes de Carlotto (born 1930), Argentine human rights activist
- Eppie Barnes (1900–1980), American baseball player, coach, and executive

=== F ===
- F. C. Barnes (1929–2011), American pastor and gospel musician
- Forrest Barnes (1905–1951), American radio writer and actor
- Francis Barnes (disambiguation)
- Frank Barnes (disambiguation)
- Fred Barnes (disambiguation)
- Freda Ellen Barnes (1902–1991), New Zealand political activist
- Frederic Gorell Barnes (1856–1939), English politician

=== G ===
- Gakirah Barnes (1997–2014), American gangster
- Geoffrey Thomas Barnes (1932–2010), British civil servant
- George Barnes (disambiguation)
- Germane Barnes (born 1985), American architect
- Giles Barnes (born 1988), English footballer
- Gladeon M. Barnes (1887–1961), United States Army officer
- Glenn Barnes, American politician
- Greer Barnes (born 1964), American comedian
- Greg Barnes, American politician
- Gregg Barnes, American costume designer
- Gustave Barnes (1877–1921), English-born Australian artist

=== H ===
- Halcyone Barnes (1913–1988), American artist
- Hamish Barnes (born 1992), Jamaican international rugby league player
- Hannah Barnes (born 1993), British racing cyclist
- H. Edgar Barnes (1883–1940), American jurist
- Harrison Barnes (born 1992), American basketball player
- Harry Barnes (disambiguation)
- Harvey Barnes (born 1997), English footballer
- Hazel Barnes (1915–2008), American philosopher, author, and translator
- Heinrich Barnes (born 1986), South African wrestler
- Helen Barnes (1895–1925), American musical comedy actress
- Henry Barnes (disambiguation)
- Henson P. Barnes (1934–2015), American politician
- Hezekiah Barnes (c. 1760–1813), American politician
- Hiram Barnes (1832–1917), Australian stagecoach pioneer
- Honey Barnes (John Francis Barnes; 1900–1981), American baseball catcher
- Horace Barnes (1891–1961), English footballer
- Howard Barnes (1909–1991), English lyricist
- Howard Turner Barnes (1873–1950), American-Canadian physicist
- Howell Barnes (1887–1959), Barbadian cricketer
- Hugh Barnes (born 1963), British journalist

=== I ===
- Ian Barnes (disambiguation)
- Imani Barnes, American politician

=== J ===
- Jack Barnes (disambiguation)
- Jackie Barnes, Australian drummer
- Jacob Barnes (born 1990), American baseball pitcher
- James Barnes (disambiguation), also Jim
- Jane Barnes (disambiguation)
- Jarred Barnes (born 1988), Irish cricketer
- Jasmine Arielle Barnes (born 1991), American composer
- Jason Barnes (born 1984), American football payer
- Jason Barnes (drummer) (born 1989), American drummer with a robotic arm
- Jeff Barnes (born 1955), American football player
- Jennifer Lynn Barnes (born 1984), American author
- Jeremy Barnes (disambiguation)
- Jerome Barnes, American politician
- Jesse Barnes (1892–1961), American baseball pitcher
- Jhane Barnes (born 1954), American fashion designer
- Jimmy Barnes (born 1956), Scottish-Australian rock musician
- Joanna Barnes (1934–2022), American actress and writer
- Joe Barnes (born 1951), American football player
- John Barnes (disambiguation)
- Johnnie Barnes (born 1968), American football player
- Johnny Barnes (1923–2016), Bermudian eccentric
- Joselpho Barnes (born 2001), German-born Ghanaian footballer
- Joseph Barnes (disambiguation)
- Josephine Barnes (1912–1999), English obstetrician
- Joshua Barnes (1654–1712), English scholar
- Jovantae Barnes (born 2003), American football running back
- Joyce Barnes (1925–2017), All-American Girls Professional Baseball League player
- Julian Barnes (born 1946), British author
- Julius H. Barnes (1873–1959), American industrialist
- Julius Steele Barnes (1792–1870), American politician and physician
- Justus D. Barnes (1862–1946), American actor

=== K ===
- Kalon Barnes (born 1998), American football player
- Katie Barnes (born 1980), American soccer player
- Katreese Barnes (1963–2019), American musician
- Kay Barnes (born 1938), American politician
- Keith Barnes (1934–2024), Welsh-born Australian rugby league footballer
- Ken Barnes (disambiguation)
- Kevin Barnes (born 1974), Sunlandic musician
- Khalif Barnes (born 1982), American football player
- Khalil Barnes (born 2005), American football player
- Kiara Barnes (born 1995), American actress
- Kim Barnes Arico (born 1970), American basketball coach
- Kirsten Barnes (born 1968), Canadian rower
- Kofi Barnes, Ghanaian-born Canadian judge
- Krys Barnes (born 1998), American football player
- Kurt Barnes (born 1981), Australian golfer

=== L ===
- LaTasha Barnes, American educator and choreographer
- Lamont Barnes (born 1978), American baseball player
- Larry Barnes (disambiguation)
- Lauren Barnes (born 1989), American soccer player
- Lavora Barnes, American political executive
- Leonard Barnes (1895–1977), British anti-colonialist writer and journalist
- Lew Barnes (born 1962), American football player
- Linda Barnes (disambiguation)
- Lisa Stone Barnes (born 1966), American politician
- Lizzie Barnes (1891–1969), American politician
- Lloyd Barnes (born 1944), Jamaican reggae music producer
- Lou Barnes (1906–1983), Australian politician
- Louise Barnes (born 1974), South African actress
- Lucius Barnes (1819–1836), American painter
- Lucy Barnes (disambiguation)
- Luther Barnes (born 1954), American ordained minister and musician
- Lyman Barnes (1855–1904), American politician
- Lynda Barnes (born 1967), American bowler

=== M ===
- Mae Barnes (1907–1996), American singer and entertainer
- Mahalia Barnes (born 1982) Australian singer-songwriter
- Malcolm Barnes (born 1941), English swimmer
- Mandela Barnes (born 1986), American politician
- Marcus Barnes (born 1996), English footballer
- Margaret Ayer Barnes (1886–1967), American playwright
- Marlin Barnes (1974–1996), American football linebacker and murder victim
- Marlon Barnes (born 1976) American football running back
- Marsha E. Barnes, American diplomat
- Martin G. Barnes (1948–2012), American politician
- Marvin Barnes (1952–2014), American basketball player
- Mary Barnes (disambiguation)
- Matthew or Matt Barnes (disambiguation)
- Max Barnes (disambiguation)
- Megan Barnes (born 2003), British swimmer
- Melany Barnes (born 1956), American politician
- Melody Barnes (born 1964), American lawyer
- Micah Barnes, Canadian musician
- Michael Barnes (disambiguation)
- Michelle Barnes (born 1948), American artist
- Michel René Barnes, American academic
- Mildred Barnes (born 1930), American basketball coach and executive
- Mildred Barnes Royse (1896–1986), American composer
- Milton Barnes (disambiguation)
- Miriam Barnes (born 1983), American hurdler and sprinter
- Monica Barnes (1936–2018), Irish politician
- Murray Barnes (1954–2011), Australian footballer

=== N ===
- Nate Barnes, American country music singer and songwriter
- Nathan Barnes (born 1975), Australian rugby league footballer
- Nathanael Barnes (born 1987), Australian rugby league footballer
- Nicholas Barnes (born 1967), British actor
- Nicky Barnes (1933-2012), American crime boss
- N'Kosie Barnes (born 1974), Antiguan sprinter

=== O ===
- Odell Barnes (disambiguation)
- Orlando M. Barnes (1824–1899), American politician
- Orsamus S. Barnes (1830–1916), American politician
- Ortheia Barnes (1944–2015), American R&B and jazz musician
- Osmond Barnes (1834–1930), British Indian Army officer

=== P ===
- Paddy Barnes (born 1987), Irish boxer
- Pancho Barnes (1901–1975), American female aviator
- Patrice Barnes, Canadian politician
- Paul Barnes (disambiguation)
- Pete Barnes (1945–2018), American football player
- Peter Barnes (disambiguation)
- Phil Barnes (born 1979), English football goalkeeper
- Phinehas Barnes (1811–1871), American politician
- Pinkie Barnes (1915–2012), English table tennis player
- Polo Barnes (1901–1981), American jazz clarinetist and saxophonist
- Prentiss Barnes (1925–2006), American musician
- Priscilla Barnes (born 1955), American actress

=== Q ===
- Quinton Barnes, Canadian rapper

=== R ===
- Ralph Barnes (disambiguation)
- Ramona Barnes (1938–2003), American politician
- Randy Barnes (born 1966), American shot putter
- Ray Barnes, American politician
- Rayford Barnes (1920–2000), American actor
- Red Barnes (1903–1959), American baseball player
- Reggie Barnes (disambiguation)
- Reginald Barnes (1871–1946), British Army officer
- Rex Barnes (born 1959), Canadian politician
- Richard Barnes (disambiguation)
- Robert Barnes (disambiguation)
- Robin Barnes, American jazz singer
- Rodney Barnes, American screenwriter and producer
- Rolph Barnes (1904–1982), Canadian runner
- Ronald Barnes (disambiguation)
- Rory Barnes (born 1946), British–born Australian author
- Rosie Barnes (born 1946), English politician
- Ross Barnes (1850–1915), American baseball player
- Rowland Barnes (1940–2005), American judge and murder victim
- Roy Barnes (born 1948), American politician
- Russell Barnes (born 1968), British television producer and director
- Ruth Barnes (born 1947), British art historian and curator
- Ryan Barnes (born 1980), Canadian hockey player
- Ryley Barnes (born 1993), Canadian volleyball player
- Ryno Barnes (born 1981), South African rugby union footballer

=== S ===
- Samuel Barnes (disambiguation)
- Sanaa Barnes (born 2000), American high jumper
- Sandra Lynn Barnes (born 1964), American sociologist
- Sarah-Jane Barnes (born 1954), British-Canadian geologist
- S. Barry Barnes (born 1943), British sociologist
- Scherod C. Barnes (born 1948), American politician
- Scott Barnes (disambiguation)
- Scottie Barnes (born 2001), American basketball player
- Sebastian Barnes (footballer) (born 1976), Ghanaian footballer
- Shirley Elizabeth Barnes (born 1938), American diplomat
- Sid Barnes (1916–1973), Australian cricketer
- Simon Barnes, former chief sports writer of The Times
- Skeeter Barnes (born 1957), American baseball utility player
- Stanley Barnes (1900–1990), American judge
- Steve Barnes (disambiguation)
- Steven Barnes (born 1952), American author
- Stuart Barnes (disambiguation)
- Sue Barnes (born 1952), Canadian politician
- Susan Barnes (disambiguation)
- Sydney Barnes (1873–1967), English cricketer
- S. W. Barnes (1824–1862), American politician

=== T ===
- Tamika Barnes, American librarian
- Tavaris Barnes (born 1991), American football player
- T. J. Barnes (born 1990), American football player
- Terry Barnes (1945–2020), English cricketer
- Thomas Barnes (disambiguation)
- Tim Barnes (politician) (born 1958), American politician
- Timothy Barnes (disambiguation)
- Tina Rose Muna Barnes (born 1962), Guamanian politician
- Tomur Barnes (born 1970), American football player
- Torian Barnes (born 2003), New Zealand rugby union player
- Tracy Barnes (1911–1972), American spy
- Trevor J. Barnes (born 1956), British-born Canadian geographer

=== V ===
- Vet Barnes (1911–1974), American baseball pitcher
- Vincent Barnes (born 1960), South African cricketer
- Virgil Barnes (1897–1958), American baseball pitcher

=== W ===
- Wallace Barnes (1926–2020), American politician
- Walley Barnes (1920–1975), Welsh footballer and broadcaster
- Walt Barnes (1918–1998), American football player and actor
- Walter Barnes (disambiguation)
- Warren Barnes (disambiguation)
- Wayne Barnes (born 1979), English rugby union referee
- Will C. Barnes (1858–1936), American recipient of the Medal of Honor
- William Barnes (disambiguation)
- Willis Barnes (1900–1976), American collegiate sports coach
- Wilson K. Barnes (1907–1997), justice of the Maryland Court of Appeals
- Winifred Barnes (1892–1935), English actress

=== Z ===
- Zadel Barnes Gustafson (1841–1917), American poet and journalist
- Zaire Barnes (born 1999), American football player
- Zandrion Barnes (born 2001), Jamaican track and field athlete

== Fictional characters ==
=== Literature ===
- Jake Barnes, protagonist of The Sun Also Rises, Ernest Hemingway's 1926 novel
- Barnes, a soldier and supporting character of the novel series Zom-B by Darren Shan

=== Film ===
- Amy Barnes, in the 1997 film Volcano (1997 film), played by Anne Heche
- Staff Sergeant Bob Barnes, in the 1986 film Platoon, played by Tom Berenger
- Bucky Barnes, Captain America's sidekick
- Leslie Barnes, in the 1990 film Die Hard 2
- Norville Barnes, in the 1994 film The Hudsucker Proxy, played by Tim Robbins
- Barnes, in the 2009 film Terminator Salvation, played by rapper Common
- Spencer Barnes, in the film Taking Care of Business, played by Charles Grodin
- The Barnes family from the 2012 film The Five-Year Engagement, including Suzie, Violet, Sylvia and George

=== Television ===
- The Barnes family, archrivals of the Ewings in the 1978–1991 soap opera Dallas as well as the 2012 revival series of the same name, including Cliff, Pamela, and Digger
- The Barnes family of the British soap opera Hollyoaks, including Amy, Kathy, Leah, Mike, and Sara
- Binky Barnes, on the animated television series Arthur
- C. J. Barnes, on the situation comedy 8 Simple Rules, played by David Spade
- Troy Barnes, on the situation comedy Community, played by Donald Glover
- Zoe Barnes, on the television series House of Cards, portrayed by Kate Mara.

=== Comics ===
- Bucky Barnes, a Marvel Comics character who was Captain America's sidekick.
- Rikki Barnes, a Marvel character who used the aliases Bucky and Nomad
- Michael Barnes, one of the characters who used the alias Shield (Archie Comics)

== See also ==
- Justice Barnes (disambiguation)
- Barns (surname)
