= Julius Barnes =

Julius Barnes may refer to:

- Julius H. Barnes (1873–1959), American industrialist and government official
- Julius Steele Barnes (1792–1870), American physician
