= Edward Barnes =

Edward, Ed, or Ted Barnes may refer to:

== Arts and entertainment ==
- Edward Barnes (poet and translator) (fl. 1760–1795), Welsh poet and translator of poetry
- Edward Shippen Barnes (1887–1958), American organist
- Edward Larrabee Barnes (1915–2004), American architect
- Edward Barnes (television executive) (1928–2021), British television executive specialising in children's programming
- Edward Barnes (composer) (born 1958), American composer and producer
- Ted Barnes (fl. 2002–2009), British folk guitarist
- Edward Barnes (Upstairs, Downstairs), fictional character in the 1970s British TV series, Upstairs, Downstairs

== Sports ==
- Edward Barnes (cricketer) (1856–1897), New Zealand cricketer
- Vet Barnes (Ed Barnes, 1911–1974), American baseball player
- Ed Barnes (rugby union) (born 1981), English rugby union player
- Ed Barnes (cricketer) (born 1997), English cricketer

== Others ==
- Edward Barnes (British Army officer) (1776–1838), British soldier and governor of Ceylon
- Edward Barnes (1892–1941), professor of chemistry and amateur botanist in India
