= Fred Barnes =

Fred, Frederic, or Frederick Barnes may refer to:

- Fred Barnes (baseball), Negro league baseball player
- Fred Barnes (footballer) (1921–1996), Australian rules footballer
- Fred Barnes (journalist) (born 1943), American journalist and political commentator
- Fred Barnes (performer) (1885–1938), English music hall artist
- Fred Barnes (pole vaulter), winner of the 1953 NCAA DI outdoor pole vault championship
- Fred J. Barnes (1873–1917), British songwriter
- Frederic Gorell Barnes (1856–1939), British politician
- Frederick Barnes (architect) (1814–1898), British architect who worked in East Anglia
- Frederick Barnes (RAAF officer) (1924–2018), Australian pilot and senior Royal Australian Air Force officer
- Frederick Barnes (The Blacklist), an episode of the American TV series The Blacklist

== See also ==
- Freddie Barnes (born 1986), American football player
