= James M. Barnes =

James M. Barnes may refer to:

- Jim Barnes (golfer) (James Martin Barnes, 1886–1966), English golfer
- James M. Barnes (politician) (1899–1958), U.S. Representative from Illinois

== See also ==
- James Barnes (disambiguation)
