= Linda Barnes =

Linda Barnes may refer to:

- Linda Barnes (writer) (born 1949), American mystery writer
- Linda Diane Barnes, American historian
- Linda L. Barnes (born 1953), American medical anthropologist

== See also ==
- Lynda Barnes (born 1967), American ten-pin bowler
