= Bert Barnes =

Bert Barnes may refer to:

- Bert Barnes (footballer) (1890–1964), Australian rules footballer
- Bert Barnes, character in The Good Terrorist, a political novel
- Bert Barnes, character in "Six Hands Across a Table", an episode of The Avengers

== See also ==
- Albert Barnes (disambiguation)
- Robert Barnes (disambiguation)
- Herbert Barnes (disambiguation)
