= Harold Barnes =

Harold Barnes may refer to:

- H. Edgar Barnes (1883–1940), American jurist
- Harry Barnes (Labour politician) (1936–2026), British Labour Party MP
- Harry Paul Barnes (1935–2016), Canadian gangster
- Jock Barnes (1907–2000), New Zealand trade unionist and syndicalist

== See also ==
- Harry Barnes (disambiguation)
