= Barmes =

Barmes is a surname. Notable people with the surname include:

- Bruce Barmes (1929–2014), American baseball player
- Clint Barmes (born 1979), American baseball player

== See also ==
- Barnes (name)
