= Ruth Barnes (disambiguation) =

Ruth Barnes (born 1947) is a British art historian and curator.

Ruth Barnes may also refer to:

- Ruth Barnes, British tennis player who partnered Anne Keothavong in the 1999 Wimbledon Championships – Girls' doubles
- Ruth Barnes, first president of Sigma Delta Pi in 1919
- Ruth Barnes, a character played by Gloria Stuart in the film Air Mail
