= Senator Barnes =

Senator Barnes may refer to:

- Charles N. Barnes (1860–1932), Illinois State Senate
- Clark Barnes (born 1950), West Virginia State Senate
- Henson P. Barnes (1934–2015), North Carolina State Senate
- John Barnes (Australian politician) (1868–1938), Senate of Australia
- John R. Barnes (1833–1919), Utah State Senate
- John Barnes Jr. (born 1931), New Hampshire State Senate
- Julius Steele Barnes (1792–1870), Connecticut State Senate
- Monica Barnes (1936–2018), Senate of Ireland
- Peter J. Barnes III (born 1956), New Jersey State Senate
- Roy Barnes (born 1948), Georgia State Senate
- Stan Barnes (politician) (born 1961), Arizona State Senate
- Tim Barnes (politician) (born 1958), Tennessee State Senate
- Tina Rose Muña Barnes (born 1962), Senate of Guam
- William D. Barnes (1856–1927), New York State Senate
