= I Hear Jesus Calling =

I Hear Jesus Calling may refer to:

- "I Hear Jesus Calling", a 1996 song by Audio Adrenaline from the album Bloom
- I Hear Jesus Calling, a 1987 album by F. C. Barnes
