= Andrew Barnes =

Andrew Barnes may refer to:

- Andy Barnes (born 1967), English footballer
- Andrew Barnes (businessman) (born 1960), New Zealand-based entrepreneur and philanthropist
