= John Barnes (disambiguation) =

John Barnes (born 1963) is an English former professional footballer and manager.

John Barnes may also refer to:

== Entertainment ==
- John Barnes (film producer) (1920–2000), American producer, director, and writer
- John Barnes (film historian) (1920–2008), British film historian
- John Barnes (English musician) (1932–2022), English jazz saxophonist and clarinettist
- John Barnes (author) (born 1957), American science fiction author
- John Barnes (American musician) (1950–2022), American session keyboardist, synthesizer programmer, and arranger

== Law ==
- Gorell Barnes, 1st Baron Gorell or John Gorell Barnes (1848–1913), British lawyer and judge
- John Barnes (judge) (1859–1919), Wisconsin Supreme Court judge
- John P. Barnes (1881–1959), U.S. federal judge

== Military ==
- John Barnes (British Army officer) (1746–1810), army officer and politician
- John Sanford Barnes (1836–1911), United States Navy officer
- John Andrew Barnes III (1945–1967), United States Army Medal of Honor recipient

== Politics ==
- John Barnes (mayor) (1817–1889), mayor of Dunedin, New Zealand
- John R. Barnes (1833–1919), member of the Utah State Senate
- John Barnes (New South Wales politician) (1838–1915)
- J. Mahlon Barnes (1866–1934), American trade union functionary and activist
- John Barnes (Australian politician) (1868–1938), union official and federal politician
- Frank Barnes (politician) (John Francis Barnes, 1904–1952), Australian politician
- John Barnes Jr. (1931–2024), member of the New Hampshire Senate
- John E. Barnes Jr. (born 1958), member of the Ohio House of Representatives
- Sir John Barnes (diplomat) (1917–1992), British civil servant and diplomat

== Sports ==
- John Barnes (baseball manager) (1855–1929), Irish minor league baseball manager
- John Barnes (Australian cricketer) (1916–2011), Australian cricketer
- John Barnes (English cricketer) (1897–1945), English cricketer
- John Barnes (Irish cricketer) (1916–1943), Irish cricketer
- John Barnes (runner) (1929–2004), American middle-distance runner
- John Barnes (Scottish broadcaster) (born c. 1960), Scottish sports commentator
- John Barnes (Australian footballer) (born 1969), Australian rules footballer
- John Barnes (outfielder) (born 1976), American baseball outfielder
- John Barnes (catcher) (1903–1972), American baseball catcher in the Negro leagues

== Other people ==
- John Barnes (monk) (died 1661), Benedictine monk
- John Arundel Barnes (1918–2010), Australian and British social anthropologist
- John Barnes (computer scientist) (fl. 1970s–2010s), programming language designer
- John Barnes, 5th Baron Gorell (born 1959), British chartered surveyor
- John H. Barnes, American architect

== Other uses ==
- John Barnes (department store), a department store in London

== See also ==
- Jack Barnes (disambiguation)
- Johnnie Barnes (born 1968), American football player
- Johnny Barnes (1923–2016), Bermudian eccentric
- Jonathan Barnes (disambiguation)
- John Spencer-Barnes (born 1961), English radio broadcaster and journalist for the BBC
- J. W. B. Barns (John Wintour Baldwin Barns], 1912–1974), British Egyptologist and Anglican priest
