= Joey Barnes =

Joey Barnes may refer to:

- Joey Barnes in Daughtry (band)
- Joey Barnes, character in Virgin River (TV series)

== See also ==
- Joseph Barnes (disambiguation)
