= Christopher Barnes =

Christopher Barnes may refer to:

- Christopher Daniel Barnes (born 1972), American actor and writer
- Christopher Barnes (cricketer) (1833–1884), English cricketer and British Army officer

== See also ==
- Chris Barnes (disambiguation)
