= Newfoundland Natives' Society =

19th-century political organization

The Newfoundland Natives' Society refers to a long-defunct patriotic organization in Newfoundland established in 1840 to protect the rights and privileges of Newfoundland-born and other longtime residents in dealings with colonial civil servants, big business owners who were not always residents, and newcomers who considered themselves much higher in the social structure than the locals even though the vast majority of locals were of the same British Isles ancestry as the new arrivals. The society's official mandate was to advance the careers and interests of native-born and other long-time residents. Newfoundlanders, regardless of gender, ethnic origin, religious affiliation or social standing were welcomed as members. This marked the arrival of a new phenomenon, Newfoundland nationalism. Natives' Society branches existed in St. John's, Harbour Grace and Carbonear as well, it is thought, in other communities.

The Natives' Society was formed by Richard Barnes in 1840 and elected its first president, Dr. Edward Kielly, on June 15, 1840. The cornerstone of the society's hall, located at Bannerman Park, was laid by Civil Governor of Newfoundland Sir John Harvey on May 24, 1845. The completed hall fell in a windstorm on September 19, 1846, killing two people.

The society had a distinctive elaborate banner with reddish pink, white and green being prominent colours. For ease of manufacture, a tricolour flag was adopted. This flag consisted of three equal width vertical panels of reddish pink (at the hoist), white (in the centre) and green (on the fly) in proportion 1:2. The flag became known as the "Native Flag". Reddish pink and white could be seen as representing the Tudor rose, the floral emblem of England. White was for the white saltire on the Scottish flag and the white down of the thistle and rare highly prized white heather, as well as the white fleur de lis of France, the predominantly white royal flag of France and the white centre in the French tricolour. Green was for the shamrock of Ireland while green and white could be seen as depicting the leek of Wales. Thus, the majority European resident groups were represented. Those and all others, especially indigenous people, could be seen as being represented by the pitcher plant in the colours red and green. The pitcher plant had been chosen by Queen Victoria as a national symbol to appear on Newfoundland coins. White could also be seen as depicting ice and snow as well as peace among the people of various ancestries. Green could also represent the various and numerous pine trees.

Other Natives' Society branches, notably in Carbonear and Harbour Grace, adopted the same reddish pink, white and green flag, thus establishing it as the first widely recognized unique but unofficial flag of Newfoundland (Island and Labrador). It was commonly called "the native flag." With the introduction of Responsible Government in 1855 need for the Society waned and it ceased functioning in 1866. The NNS had worked for the establishment of responsible government. In 1871 the Roman Catholic Church established a fishermen's aid and benefit organization, the Newfoundland Fishermen's Star of the Sea Association. Its official banner was a green background with a central white star with a pink cross in it. The green depicted the cold and dangerous North Atlantic Ocean, the great many local pine trees, and possibly the shamrock of Ireland since the vast majority of Newfoundland Catholics at the time were of Irish ancestry. The star was for Polaris (the North Star) which was very important in navigation. Also in the Roman Catholic Church. Mary, the mother of Jesus, is known as the Star of the Sea (Stella Maris in Latin).

The cross indicated the association's Christian church affiliation and the colour pink was a liturgical colour for joyous celebration in the Anglican, Methodist, Roman Catholic, Lutheran, and many other Christian denominations. Pink was also used non-liturgically to signify joyous celebration. The banner gave rise to what was commonly named the "pink, white and green" tricolour flag which became the unofficial flag of the association. With green at the hoist, white in the centre and pink on the fly it should have been called "the green, white and pink."

With the demise of the Natives' Society, the flag was often mistakenly called the "Native Flag" by the public and even newspaper reporters. The green-white-pink tricolour which started as the unofficial flag of a fishermen's association has survived and become known as the Newfoundland tricolour flag. It is very distinctive since very few flags show any pink and even fewer as much as a third of the flag. One notable exception is the flag of the State of Espírito Santo (Holy Spirit) in Brazil, which is also one third pink. The older red-white-green "Native Flag" created by the Newfoundland Natives' Society has been forgotten even though it served as the first home-grown but unofficial flag of the Colony of Newfoundland (Island and Labrador) for many years in the 19th century.
