= Jonathan Barnes (disambiguation) =

Jonathan Barnes (born 1942) is an English scholar of ancient philosophy.

Jonathan Barnes may also refer to:

- Jonathan Barnes (author), British writer
- Jonathan Barnes House, historic house in Hillsborough, New Hampshire

== See also ==
- John Barnes (disambiguation)
