= Charles Barnes =

Charles or Charlie Barnes may refer to:

- Charles Reid Barnes (1858–1910), American botanist
- Charles Adams Barnes (1859–1900), expeditioner and namesake of Mount Barnes in the U.S. state of Washington
- Charles N. Barnes (1860–1932), American politician and lawyer
- Charles P. Barnes (1869–1951), associate justice and chief justice of the Maine Supreme Judicial Court
- Charles Barnes (cricketer) (1882–1947), Australian cricketer
- Charles Barnes (Australian politician) (1901–1998), Australian politician
- Charlie Barnes (Australian footballer) (1903–1981), Australian rules footballer
- Chuck Barnes (Charles M. Barnes, c. 1931–1979), American sports agent and businessman
- Ron Barnes (footballer) (Charles Ronald Barnes, 1936–1991), English footballer
- Charley Barnes (born 1939), American football player
- Charlie Barnes (musician) (born 1989), English singer-songwriter
- Charlie Barnes (baseball) (born 1995), American baseball pitcher

== See also ==
- Charles Barnes House, listed on the National Register of Historic Places in Park City, Utah
