= James Barnes =

James, Jim, or Jimmy Barnes may refer to:

== People ==
=== Arts and entertainment ===
- James Barnes (author) (1866–1936), American author
- James Barnes (composer) (born 1949), American composer
- James Barnes (television director) (born 1979), English television director
- Jim Barnes (writer) (born 1933), Native American writer
- Jimmy Barnes (born 1956), Scottish-Australian rock musician

=== Politics ===
- James Barnes (Canadian politician) (1842–1924), farmer, lumberman, railway contractor and political figure in New Brunswick, Canada
- James M. Barnes (politician) (1899–1958), U.S. Representative from Illinois
- James Strachey Barnes (1890–1955), British Fascist Party member and diarist
- Jim Barnes (politician) (1908–1995), New Zealand politician

=== Sports ===
- James Barnes (cricketer) (1886–1963), English cricketer
- Jim Barnes (golfer) (1886–1966), English professional golfer
- Jim Barnes (offensive guard), American football player
- Jim Barnes (American football, born 1959), American football player and coach
- Jim "Bad News" Barnes (1941–2002), American basketball player

=== Other fields ===
- James Barnes (civil servant) (1891–1969), English civil servant
- James Barnes (engineer) (1740–1819), English canal engineer
- James Barnes (general) (1801–1869), American railroad executive and Union Army general in the American Civil War
- James Antonio Barnes (born 1944), American serial killer
- James Hector Barnes (1879–1917), British agricultural chemist
- James Phillip Barnes (1962–2023), American convicted murderer
- James Stevenson Barnes (1756–1823), British colonel who served in the Napoleonic Wars
- A. James Barnes (born 1942), American attorney, dean and professor

== Fictional characters ==
- Bucky Barnes also known as James Barnes, sidekick of Captain America and inheritor of the name

== Other ==
- SS James Barnes, initial name of cargo ship USS Algol (AKA-54)
