= Jack Barnes =

Jack Barnes may refer to:

- Jack Barnes (politician) (born 1940), American communist and the National Secretary of the Socialist Workers Party
- Jack Barnes (English footballer) (1908–2008), English association footballer
- Jack Barnes (Australian footballer) (1905–1999), Australian rules footballer
- Jack Barnes (rugby league), English rugby league player
- Jack Barnes (toxinologist) (1922–1985), Australian toxinologist
- Jack Barnes (high jumper) (born 1924), American high jumper, 1949 All-American for the USC Trojans track and field team

== See also ==
- Jock Barnes (1907–2000), New Zealand trade unionist
- John Barnes (disambiguation)
