= Herbert Barnes (disambiguation) =

Herbert Barnes (1833–1890) was Archdeacon of Barnstaple.

Herbert Barnes may also refer to:

- Herbert Barnes, character in The White Shadow (film)
- Herbert Curie Barnes, served as Private Secretary to the Chief Commissioner of Burma, brother of Hugh Shakespear Barnes

== See also ==
- Bert Barnes (disambiguation)
