= Brian McRae Barnes =

- Occupations: Zoologist and academic

Academic background
- Education: University of California, Riverside; University of Washington

Academic work
- Institutions: University of Alaska Fairbanks

Brian McRae Barnes is a zoologist and an academic. His works have focused on hibernation science, biological rhythms, physiological ecology, comparative endocrinology, and overwintering biology. He was appointed the inaugural Knut Schmidt-Nielsen Named Lecturer by the International Union of Physiological Sciences in 2009 and was elected a fellow by the American Association for the Advancement of Science in 2011.

== Education ==
Barnes completed his Bachelor's in Biology at the University of California, Riverside in 1977. He earned his Ph.D. in Zoology from the University of Washington in 1983 in the lab of Jim Kenagy.

== Career ==
After training as a postdoc at the University of California, Berkeley under Irv Zucker and Paul Licht, Barnes began his career at the University of Alaska Fairbanks as an assistant professor of Zoophysiology in 1986. He was promoted to an associate professor in 1991 and a professor in 2000. He was appointed as the Glaser Distinguished Professor at Florida International University in 2011.

From 2000 to 2020, Barnes was the director of the Institute of Arctic Biology. He was also the principal investigator for the Toolik Field Station's cooperative agreement with NSF and was appointed as the director at the Alaska INBRE in 2014. He has also served as both science director and co-science director of the Toolik Field Station in Arctic Alaska at the University of Alaska Fairbanks.

== Research ==
Barnes's work is mostly focused in the areas of hibernation science, biological rhythms, physiological ecology, comparative endocrinology, and overwintering biology.

=== Hibernation science ===
One of Barnes' earliest works involved the golden-mantled ground squirrels and how their winter hibernation, particularly their torpor state, is related to their reproduction cycle. He showed that seasonal reproductive maturation (puberty) in males requires that, while remaining in their hibernacula, males return to high body temperatures in spring one to three weeks before females emerge. His early research on arctic ground squirrels, published as the cover article in Science Magazine, demonstrated that during hibernation, arctic ground squirrels regularly supercool their body to several degrees below the freezing point. Along with his colleagues, he determined that during deep torpor, brain wave activity ceases, and that warming up from it causes squirrels to go from NREM to REM sleep before returning to the torpor state. He has also conducted long-term studies of the daily and seasonal activity patterns in free-living arctic ground squirrels with the use of lightloggers. This work includes the observations that, with rapid climate change in their arctic environment, the timing of spring emergence from hibernation is changing in female but not male ground squirrels. His research also includes studies on large hibernators such as bears, wherein, with his colleague Oivind Toien, he demonstrated their ability to reduce metabolic rate while keeping a relatively high body temperature during hibernation.

=== Biological rhythms ===
Barnes and his colleagues found in a study conducted on Siberian hamsters that the SCN-BAT connection is linked to torpor state, and that lesioning them results in the animal being unable to go back into it. Along with Hut, he observed that periodically, the state of torpor is interrupted by short events of arousal where the core temperature of an animal is increased and most physiological functioning is restored. In another one of his studies, he and his colleagues implanted temperature data loggers to track the interbout arousals in Arctic ground squirrels.

He also investigated how abiotic conditions have an impact on the annual rhythms of a sample of various species, and how changes in said conditions can disturb them. Moreover, he found that animal activity does not rely completely on circadian rhythms and could happen around the clock in constant environments.

=== Physiological ecology ===
Focusing on physiological ecology, Barnes looked at how body mass loss remains the same in arctic ground squirrels, whether they are in colder or warmer burrows. In related research on arctic ground squirrels, he also found that polysaccharated fatty acid levels in the diet have a small impact on their torpor patterns. His work on these squirrels also extends to the state of torpor as a response to the extreme Arctic cold and how it is briefly interrupted by interbout arousal or IBA every 3 weeks for rewarming.

=== Comparative endocrinology ===
Barnes has also conducted research on golden mantled squirrels, where he found that sperm maturation was temporarily linked to an increase in testosterone levels after hibernation. Regarding hormones, he found that male arctic ground squirrels show an increased androgen level during peak breeding seasons and when encountering other males later in the spring. His work has also pointed out how environmental cues like green-up and senescence are crucial for the circannual rhythm in small mammals.

=== Overwintering biology ===
Barnes' work also extends to insects, where in a study on insect blood or hemolymph, he and his colleagues found that at least 50 species of insects and spiders had Alpha-Fetoproteins in their blood. He also investigated the physiology of the Alaska and Indiana variants of the Cucujus clavipes beetle where he found that the Alaskan variant had a lower SCP. He also contributed to the discovery of a xylomannan-based antifreeze glycolipid in the darkling beetle Upis ceramboides. He also highlighted that wood frogs overwintering in Alaska experience the coldest temperatures experienced by frog species, and noted the importance of cryprotectants in surviving freeze-thaw cycles. Moreover, he found that therapeutic interventions increased the creature's cryotolerance, staying frozen for as long as 218 days.

== Awards and honors ==
- 1992-1997 – Career Development Award National Institutes of Health
- 1994 – Elected Secretary, American Society of Zoologists
- 2009 – Knut Schmidt-Nielsen Named Lecturer (Inaugural), International Union of Physiological Sciences
- 2011 – Elected Fellow, American Association for the Advancement of Science
- 2020 – Edith Bullock Prize for Excellence, University of Alaska Fairbanks

== Selected articles ==
- Daan, Serge; Barnes, Brian M.; Strijkstra, Arjen M. (1991). "Warming up for sleep? — Ground squirrels sleep during arousals from hibernation". Neuroscience Letters. 128 (2): 265–268. Bibcode:1991NeuL..128..265D. doi:10.1016/0304-3940(91)90276-Y. PMID 1945046.
- Boyer, Bert B.; Barnes, Brian M. (1999). "Molecular and Metabolic Aspects of Mammalian Hibernation". BioScience. 49 (9): 713–724. Bibcode:1999BiSci..49..713B. doi:10.2307/1313595. JSTOR 1313595.
- Buck, C. Loren; Barnes, Brian M. (2000). "Effects of ambient temperature on metabolic rate, respiratory quotient, and torpor in an arctic hibernator". American Journal of Physiology. Regulatory, Integrative and Comparative Physiology. 279 (1): R255–R262. Bibcode:2000AJPRI.279.R255B. doi:10.1152/ajpregu.2000.279.1.R255. PMID 10896889.
- Tøien, Øivind; Blake, John; Edgar, Dale M.; Grahn, Dennis A.; Heller, H. Craig; Barnes, Brian M. (2011). "Hibernation in Black Bears: Independence of Metabolic Suppression from Body Temperature". Science. 331 (6019): 906–909. Bibcode:2011Sci...331..906T. doi:10.1126/science.1199435. PMID 21330544.
- Bloch, Guy; Barnes, Brian M.; Gerkema, Menno P.; Helm, Barbara (2013). "Animal activity around the clock with no overt circadian rhythms: patterns, mechanisms and adaptive value". Proceedings of the Royal Society B: Biological Sciences. 280 (1765) 20130019. Bibcode:2013PBioS.28030019B. doi:10.1098/rspb.2013.0019. PMC 3712434. PMID 23825202.
