= Alan Barnes =

Alan Barnes may refer to:

- Alan Barnes (cricketer) (1850–1915), English cricketer
- Alan Barnes (murder victim) (c. 1962–1979), murder victim in Adelaide, possibly killed by Bevan Spencer von Einem
- Alan Barnes (musician) (born 1959), English jazz musician
- Alan Barnes (writer), British writer and editor in the field of cult film and television
