= Matt Barnes (disambiguation) =

Matt Barnes (born 1980) is an American former basketball player.

Matthew or Matt Barnes is also the name of:

== Sports ==
- Matt Barnes (baseball) (born 1990), American baseball pitcher
- Matt Barnes (American football) (born 1986), American football coach
- Matt Barnes (ice hockey) (born 1974), Canadian ice hockey goaltender
- Matt Barnes (soccer) (born 1972), American soccer coach

== Others ==
- Matt Barnes, member of the British rock band You Me at Six
- Matthew Barnes (born 1973), British businessman

== See also ==
- Matthew Barnes-Homer (born 1986), English footballer
