= Henry Barnes =

Henry Barnes may refer to:

- Henry Barnes (cricketer) (1869–1946), Irish cricketer and British Army officer
- Henry Barnes (traffic engineer) (1906–1968), American traffic engineer
- Henry Barnes, 2nd Baron Gorell (1882–1917), barrister, died while serving in World War I
- Henry Edwin Barnes (1848–1896), English ornithologist
- Henry Winslow Barnes (1818–1873), American politician in Wisconsin
- Henry Barnes (musician), founder of several powerviolence and hardcore punk bands

== See also ==
- Harry Barnes (disambiguation)
