= Eric Barnes =

Eric Barnes may refer to:

== Sports ==
- Eric Barnes (footballer) (1937–2014), English footballer
- Eric Barnes (soccer), American soccer player and coach
- Eric Barnes (rugby league) (1940–2019), Australian rugby league footballer
- Eric Randolph Barnes or Randy Barnes, (born 1966), American olympic shot putter

== Others ==
- Eric Barnes (writer) (born 1968), American writer
- Eric Stephen Barnes (1924–2000), Australian mathematician
- Eric Wollencott Barnes (1907–1962), American educator, diplomat, actor, and author

== See also ==
- Erik Barnes (born 1987), American golfer
- Erich Barnes (1935–2022), American football player
