= Jeremy Barnes =

Jeremy Barnes may refer to:

- Jeremy Barnes (baseball) (born 1987), American baseball coach
- Jeremy Barnes (cricketer) (born 1970), English cricketer and clergyman
- Jeremy Barnes (musician) (born 1976), American musician
