= Richard Barnes =

Richard Barnes may refer to:

- Richard Barnes (bishop) (1532–1587), Bishop of Durham
- Richard Barnes (Newfoundland politician) (1805–1846), Newfoundland businessman and politician
- Richard Hawksworth Barnes (1831–1904), English coffee grower, naturalist and meteorologist
- Richard Barnes (cricketer) (1849–1902), Australian cricketer
- E. Richard Barnes (1906–1985), California politician
- Richard Barnes (South Dakota politician), (born 1941), South Dakota politician
- Richard Barnes (author) (born 1944), English writer known for his association with rock band The Who
- Richard Barnes (musician) (1944–2025), British singer and actor
- Richard Barnes (British politician) (born 1947), London politician
- Rick Barnes (born 1954), American basketball coach
- Rich Barnes (born 1959), American baseball player
- Ricky Barnes (born 1981), American golfer

== See also ==
- Richard Barnes Mason (1797–1850), U.S. army officer
