= Judge Barnes =

Judge Barnes may refer to:

- David L. Barnes (1760–1812), judge of the United States District Court for the District of Rhode Island
- Harry F. Barnes (1932–2019), judge of the United States District Court for the Western District of Arkansas
- John P. Barnes (1881–1959), judge of the United States District Court for the Northern District of Illinois
- Stanley Barnes (1900–1990), judge of the United States Court of Appeals for the Ninth Circuit

== See also ==
- Justice Barnes (disambiguation)
