= Samuel Barnes =

Samuel Barnes may refer to:

- Samuel Barnes, one half of the Trackmasters and a rapper known also as Red Hot Lover Tone
- Samuel Barnes (Australian politician) (1865–1951), member of the Victorian Parliament
- S. A. G. Barnes (Samuel Augustus Gordon Barnes, 1876–1941), member of the Legislative Assembly of Alberta
- Samuel H. Barnes (1808–1860), American politician from New York
- Sam Barnes (baseball) (1899–1981), American baseball player
- Sam Barnes (footballer, born 1991), English football centre-back
- Sam Barnes (footballer, born 2001), English football centre-back for Blackburn Rovers
