= Ken Barnes =

Ken or Kenneth Barnes is the name of:

- Ken Barnes (writer) (1933–2015), British writer, record producer and film historian
- Ken Barnes (English footballer) (1929–2010), English footballer
- Ken Barnes (soldier) (1935–2009), Jamaican soldier, politician, and footballer
- Sir Kenneth Barnes (director) (1878–1957), director of the Royal Academy of Dramatic Art
- Sir Kenneth Barnes (civil servant) (1922–2010), English civil servant
- Kenneth Barnes (bank robber) (1954–2019), American bank robber
- Ken Barnes (Australian footballer) (born 1941), Australian rules footballer
