= Gina Zanetakos =

- The Blacklist episode
- Episode no.: Season 1 Episode 6
- Directed by: Adam Arkin
- Written by: Wendy West
- Production code: 106
- Original air date: October 28, 2013

Guest appearances
- Margarita Levieva as Gina Zanetakos; Dikran Tulaine as Max; Amir Arison as Aram Mojtabai; Charles Baker as Grey; Hisham Tawfiq as Dembe Zuma; Graeme Malcolm as The Man with the Apple; Derek Peith as Nadeem Idris

Episode chronology
← Previous "The Courier"	Next → "Frederick Barnes"
- The Blacklist season 1

"Gina Zanetakos" is the sixth episode of the first season of the American crime drama The Blacklist. The episode premiered in the United States on NBC on October 28, 2013.

== Plot ==
After Tom confronts Liz about the box, and she produces the photo of him in Boston where the murder took place, he claims he is innocent and insists that they turn it in to the FBI so his name can be cleared. Elsewhere, Red informs Elizabeth and the FBI that the next name on the Blacklist is a beautiful and deadly corporate terrorist, Gina Zanetakos (Margarita Levieva), who he claims is Tom's lover. Elsewhere, Tom maintains his innocence while being interrogated. Soon, Liz realizes there is more than meets the eye when she discovers the passports containing Tom's face are forged, and he's possibly been set up. When Zanetakos says Red was behind the Boston incident, and Zanetakos has never seen Tom before, Liz tells Red the two of them are "done". The men watching Liz and Tom don't know whether Tom is innocent or not, but they are "sure he doesn't work for Reddington".

== Reception ==
=== Ratings ===
"Gina Zanetakos" premiered on NBC on October 28, 2013, in the 10–11 p.m. time slot. The episode garnered a 3.1/8 Nielsen rating with 10.51 million viewers, making it the second most-watched show in its time slot behind ABC's Castle, which collected 10.69 million viewers. "Gina Zanetakos" was also the eighth most-watched television show of the week.

=== Reviews ===
Jason Evans of The Wall Street Journal gave a positive review of the episode: "For every answer, this show gives us two new mysteries. Things that we think are true are shown to be lies. What fun! So, after the past several episodes making Tom look like a bad guy and Red seem honest, we get one that completely flips the story".

Phil Dyess-Nugent of The A.V. Club gave the episode a "C−". He called the "evil scheme" of the episode his favorite "since Christopher Walken in A View To A Kill conspired to achieve a monopoly on the microchip business by flooding Silicon Valley". However, he went on to criticize Red's way of saying something "incomprehensible" to someone, as he thought the people Red were talking to were "only bewildered because of [the] cultural differences" between them.
