= George Barnes =

George Barnes may refer to:

== Politics ==
- George Barnes (Georgia politician) (1833–1901), United States Representative from the state of Georgia
- George Barnes (Australian politician) (1856–1949), Queensland businessman and politician, MLA for Warwick
- George Barnes (British politician) (1859–1940), Scottish politician, Leader of the Labour Party
- George B. Barnes (1904–2000), American politician who was the Speaker of the Maine House of Representatives from 1945 to 1947
- George F. Barnes (1919–2004), American politician in the Virginia state senate

== Sports ==
- George Barnes (sport shooter) (1849–1934), British Olympic sport shooter
- George Barnes (footballer, born 1876) (1876–1946), English footballer
- George Arthur Barnes (1883–1919), English racing motorcyclist and pioneer aviator
- George Barnes (footballer, born 1899) (1899–1961), English footballer
- George Barnes (boxer) (1927–2000), Australian boxer of the 1940s, '50s and '60s
- George Barnes (wrestler), Australian actor and professional wrestler

== Other ==
- George Barnes (priest) (1782–1847), Archdeacon of Barnstaple
- George Barnes (cinematographer) (1892–1953), American cinematographer
- Machine Gun Kelly (1895–1954), American gangster, born George Kelly Barnes
- Sir George Barnes (BBC controller) (1904–1960), British television and radio producer and executive
- George Barnes (musician) (1921–1977), American jazz guitarist
