= Annie Barnes =

Annie Barnes may refer to:

- Annie Barnes (academic) (1903–2003), Swiss-English academic of French literature
- Annie Barnes (suffragist) (1886–1982), British socialist and suffragist
- Annie Maria Barnes (1857–1933 or 1943), American journalist, editor and author
