= Barns (surname) =

Barns is a surname. Notable people with the name include:

- Caleb P. Barns (1812–1866) American lawyer, businessman, and legislator
- Charles Edward Barns (1862–1937), American writer, journalist, astronomer, theater impresario, and publisher
- Chris Barns, founder of the Kangaroo Sanctuary
- Cornelia Barns (1888–1941), American feminist, socialist, and political cartoonist
- Ethel Barns (1873–1948), English violinist, pianist and composer
- Graeme Barns (born 1962), Australian rower
- Greg Barns (born 1962), Australian barrister, author
- J. W. B. Barns (1912–1974), British Egyptologist, papyrologist, Anglican priest, and academic
- Paul D. Barns (1894–1973), American judge
- Thomas Alexander Barns (1881–1930), English naturalist and explorer

== See also ==
- Barnes (name), given name and surname
