= Thomas Barnes =

Thomas, Tom, or Tommy Barnes may refer to:

== Law and politics ==
- Thomas Barnes (Mississippi politician) (fl. 1817–1818), American politician in Mississippi
- Thomas Barnes (MP) (1812–1897), British MP for Bolton
- Thomas H. Barnes (1831–1913), American politician and physician from Virginia
- Sir Thomas Barnes (solicitor) (1888–1964), English government lawyer

== Sports ==
- Thomas Wilson Barnes (1825–1874), English chess master
- Thomas Barnes (cricketer) (1849–1873), English cricketer
- Tommy Barnes (1951–2013), American football player and coach
- Tom Barnes (bobsleigh) (born 1959), American Olympic bobsledder
- Tom Barnes (gymnast) (born 1990), Scottish gymnast

== Others ==
- Thomas Barnes (Unitarian) (1747–1810), English Unitarian minister and educational reformer
- Thomas Barnes (journalist) (1785–1841), British journalist and editor of The Times
- T. Roy Barnes (Thomas Roy Barnes, 1880–1937), British-American actor
- Thomas G. Barnes (1911–2001), American physicist and creationist
- Thomas N. Barnes (1930–2003), U.S. Air Force fourth Chief Master Sergeant
- Tom Barnes (American journalist) (1946–2016), American journalist
