= Brian Barnes =

Brian Barnes may refer to:

- Brian Barnes (artist) (1944–2021), English artist
- Brian Barnes (baseball) (born 1967), American baseball player
- Brian Barnes (golfer) (1945–2019), Scottish golfer
- Brian Barnes (swimmer) (1934–2024), British swimmer
- Brian James Barnes (1933–2017), Roman Catholic archbishop
- Brian McRae Barnes, American zoologist
