= Stuart Barnes (disambiguation) =

Stuart Barnes (born 1962) is an English rugby union player and commentator.

Stuart Barnes may also refer to:

- Stuart Barnes (cricketer) (born 1970), English cricketer
- Stuart Barnes (poet) (born 1977), Australian poet
- Stu Barnes (born 1970), Canadian hockey player
