= Ambrose Barnes =

Ambrose Barnes (1627–1710), was an English nonconformist and Alderman of Newcastle.

== Biography ==
Barnes, of Newcastle, the eldest son of Thomas Barnes, a prominent Puritan of Startforth, Yorkshire, was born there in 1627; was apprenticed to a merchant adventurer of Newcastle in 1646; showed remarkable aptitude for trade; became a merchant adventurer in 1654–5 and alderman of Newcastle in 1658. A Puritan from his youth, Barnes strove to alleviate the sufferings of the nonconformists in the north during the reign of Charles II, and was for some time imprisoned in Tynemouth Castle for holding prayer meetings in his own house.

Barnes was a close friend of Richard Gilpin, Simeon Ashe, Edmund Calamy, and Joseph Caryll, and often met Richard Baxter at the London house of Alderman Henry Ashurst. He died 23 March 1710.

== Works ==
Barnes wrote a Breviate of the Four Monarchies, an Inquiry into the Nature, Grounds, and Reasons of Religion, and a Censure upon the Times and Age he lived in. Extracts only from these works, which all display much learning, have been published; they went in manuscript in the library of the Literary and Philosophical Society of Newcastle, together with a discursive life of Barnes (dated 1716) by an unidentified writer, who signs himself "M. R."

Barnes's memoirs and works were printed in an abridged form by the Newcastle Typographical Society in 1828, and again in a more complete version, with full notes, by the Surtees Society in 1867, under the direction of W. H. D. Longstaffe. The Life shows Barnes to have been a man of independent character, and to have enjoyed the regard of men of all parties. He hated Charles II, whom he saw in London when he presented a petition to the privy council in behalf of the municipal rights of Newcastle, but he showed some respect for James II.

== Family ==
Barnes married Mary Butler in 1655, and had by her seven children. His eldest son Joseph was recorder of Newcastle from 1687 to 1711, and his son Thomas was minister of the independent congregation from 1698 until his death in 1731.
