= Alan Barnes (cricketer) =

English cricketer

Personal information
- Full name: Alan Sedgwick Barnes
- Born: 9 October 1850; Anfield, Liverpool
- Died: 17 May 1915 (aged 64); Twyford Abbey
- Batting: Right-handed

Domestic team information
- Years: Team
- 1877–1879: MCC
- 1878: Derbyshire
- First-class debut: 24 May 1877 MCC v Oxford University
- Last First-class: 17 July 1879 MCC v Kent

Career statistics
Competition	First-class
Matches	13
Runs scored	107
Batting average	5.94
100s/50s	0/0
Top score	16
Catches/stumpings	4/–
- Source: CricketArchive, 25 January 2011

Alan Sedgwick Barnes (9 October 1850 – 17 May 1915) was an English first-class cricketer who played for Marylebone Cricket Club (MCC) between 1877 and 1879 and for Derbyshire in 1878.

Barnes was born in Anfield, and his brother John was a barrister. Barnes made his debut cricketing appearance for MCC against South Wales Cricket Club during the 1874 season, in which, despite finishing on a duck in the first innings from the upper order, the team recovered to win by a comfortable margin. Barnes' debut first-class appearance came three years later, for MCC against Oxford University, in which the university side finished on 12 all out in the first innings, in a game scheduled for three days but finished in just a single day.

Barnes continued to play for MCC in the early part of the 1878 season. He also played three matches in a month for Derbyshire during the 1878 season.

Barnes continued to play for Marylebone Cricket Club in 1879, with the team picking up two innings-margin victories from three wins and two losses.

Barnes was a right-handed batsman and played 20 innings in 13 first-class matches at an average of 5.94 and a top score on 16.

Barnes died in Twyford Abbey at the age of 64. His nephew, Ronald, played first-class cricket for Oxford University and, most notably, Marylebone Cricket Club, during the early part of the twentieth century.
