= Chris Barnes =

Chris Barnes may refer to:

- Chris Barnes (actor) (born 1965), American child actor
- Chris Barnes (bowler) (born 1970), American bowler
- Chris Barnes (musician) (born 1967), American death metal vocalist
- Chris Gorell Barnes (born 1974), English digital entrepreneur and marine conservationist

== See also ==
- Krys Barnes (born 1998), American football player
- Christopher Barnes (disambiguation)
