= Richard Barnes (Newfoundland politician) =

Newfoundland politician

- Born: March 15, 1805; St. John’s, Newfoundland
- Died: September 3, 1846 (aged 41); St. John’s, Newfoundland
- Occupations: businessman, politician
- Years active: 1842–1846
- Known for: member, Newfoundland House of Assembly; founder, Newfoundland Natives' Society
- Spouse: Eunice Alice Morris (m.1840)

Richard Barnes (March 15, 1805 – September 3, 1846) was a native born businessman from St. John’s, Newfoundland. He represented Trinity Bay in the Newfoundland House of Assembly from 1842 to 1846.

The son of William Barnes and Hannah Butler, Barnes was largely self-educated and involved in the family business which was shipping and carpentry. In 1840 he was a prominent founder of the Newfoundland Natives' Society. He entered politics during the time of the very dysfunctional Representative Government. The founding of the Natives' Society can be considered one of the earliest manifestations of Newfoundland nationalism. The Natives' Society lobbied for Responsible Government.

Barnes married Eunice Alice Morris in 1840. He died in office in St. John's at the age of 41.
