= Charlie Barnes (Australian footballer) =

Australian rules footballer (1903–1981)

Personal information
- Full name: Charlie Barnes
- Born: 25 April 1903
- Died: 27 August 1981 (aged 78)
- Original team: Latrobe
- Height: 178 cm (5 ft 10 in)
- Weight: 90 kg (198 lb)

Playing career^{1}
Years	Club	Games (Goals)
1927–29	Melbourne	33 (0)
- ^{1} Playing statistics correct to the end of 1929.

Charlie Barnes (25 April 1903 – 27 August 1981) was an Australian rules footballer who played with Melbourne in the Victorian Football League (VFL).
