= Francis Barnes =

Francis Barnes may refer to:

- Francis Barnes (philosopher) (1744–1838), English philosopher
- Francis V. Barnes (died 2021), Secretary of the Pennsylvania Department of Education, 2004–2005

== See also ==
- Frank Barnes (disambiguation)
