= Peter Barnes =

Peter Barnes may refer to:

== Politicians ==
- Peter J. Barnes Jr. (1928–2018), American politician
- Peter J. Barnes III (1956–2021), American politician

== Sportsmen ==
- Peter Barnes (footballer) (born 1957), English football player
- Pete Barnes (1945–2018), American football player

== Others ==
- Peter Barnes (entrepreneur) (born 1940), American businessman and environmentalist
- Peter Barnes (Irish republican) (1907–1940), IRA member, perpetrator of the 1939 Coventry bombing
- Peter Barnes (journalist), senior Washington correspondent for the Fox Business Network
- Peter Barnes (lighting designer) (born 1955), English lighting designer and show producer
- Peter Barnes (pilot) (1962–2013), British helicopter pilot
- Peter Barnes (playwright) (1931–2004), English playwright and screenwriter
- Peter Barnes (respiratory scientist) (born 1946), British respiratory scientist and clinician

== See also ==
- John Peter Barnes (1881–1959), United States federal judge
