= Henry Barnes (cricketer) =

Irish cricketer and British Army officer

Personal information
- Full name: Henry Marshall Barnes
- Born: 27 June 1869; Newbridge, Ireland
- Died: 8 June 1946 (aged 76); Ipswich, Suffolk, England
- Batting: Unknown
- Relatives: Christopher Barnes (father)

Domestic team information
- Years: Team
- 1907: Marylebone Cricket Club

Career statistics
Competition	First-class
Matches	1
Runs scored	3
Batting average	–
100s/50s	–/–
Top score	3*
Catches/stumpings	–/–
- Source: Cricinfo, 12 September 2021

Henry Marshall Barnes (27 June 1869 — 8 June 1946) was an Irish first-class cricketer and British Army officer.

The son of the cricketer and soldier Christopher Barnes, he was born in Ireland at Newbridge and was educated in England at Marlborough College. From Marlborough he pursued a career in the British Army, graduating from the Royal Military Academy, Woolwich as a second lieutenant in February 1889. He was promoted to lieutenant in February 1892, with Barnes being seconded as an adjutant of a Militia Artillery in February 1899, being made a supernumerary captain upon this appointment. He gained the full rank in February 1904.

The following year he was promoted to major, before retiring from active service in September 1909. Barnes played first-class cricket in 1907, making a single appearance against Derbyshire at Lord's. After retiring from the military, Barnes became a director of the Ipswich based printing firm Norman Adlard & Co. Ltd, in addition to holding a directorship of Dindings Rubber Estates in 1927. He was involved in local politics in Ipswich, serving on Ipswich Town Council. Barnes died there in June 1946. He was married to Louisa Gibson Blaikie, who survived him.
