= Ken Barnes (Australian footballer) =

Australian rules footballer

Personal information
- Full name: Ken Barnes
- Born: 27 December 1941 (age 84)
- Height: 193 cm (6 ft 4 in)
- Weight: 92 kg (203 lb)

Playing career^{1}
| Years | Club | Games (Goals) |
| 1964–67 | South Melbourne | 15 (2) |
- ^{1} Playing statistics correct to the end of 1967.

Ken Barnes (born 27 December 1941) is a former Australian rules footballer who played with South Melbourne in the Victorian Football League (VFL). He was recruited from Williamstown in 1964, after winning the Seconds best and fairest award in 1962. He returned to Williamstown during 1967 and played until the end of 1971, when he was captain after Max Papley stood out from playing for a season. He was vice-captain in 1969 and 1970. He played in the 1969 VFA Second Division premiership victory in 1969 over Sunshine and was in the losing 1968 Second Division loss to Geelong West. He also won the Club best and fairest award in 1969. He was selected as first ruck in the Williamstown 1960's Team of the Decade. He played a total of 96 games for the Seagulls and kicked 56 goals. He is the son of former South Melbourne and Williamstown player and State cricketer, Jack Barnes.
