= Steve Barnes =

Steve Barnes may refer to:

- Steve Barnes (actor) (born 1967), American actor, radio personality, and media executive
- Steve Barnes (basketball) (born 1957), American men's college basketball coach
- Steve Barnes (footballer) (born 1976), English former professional footballer
- Steve Barnes (ice hockey) (born 1970), Canadian ice hockey player
- Steve Barnes (attorney) (1959–2020), American lawyer and founding partner at Cellino and Barnes

== See also ==
- Steven Barnes (born 1952), American science fiction writer, lecturer, and human performance technician
