= Ben Barnes =

Ben Barnes may refer to:

- Ben Barnes (actor) (born 1981), English actor
- Ben Barnes (Texas politician) (born 1938), American politician and lobbyist in Texas
- Ben Barnes (Shawnee), chief of the Shawnee Tribe, in Oklahoma
- Ben Barnes (Maryland politician) (born 1975), American politician in Maryland

== See also ==
- Benny Barnes (born 1951), American football player
- Benny Barnes (singer) (1934–1985), American singer-songwriter
