= Ernest Barnes (disambiguation) =

Ernest Barnes (1874–1953) was a British mathematician, scientist, liberal theologian, and bishop.

Ernest or Ernie Barnes may also refer to:

- Ernest Barnes (athlete) (1885–1956), British track and field athlete
- Ernie Barnes (field hockey) (born 1937), New Zealand field hockey player and coach
- Ernie Barnes (1938–2009), African-American painter and football player
- Ernest Harlington Barnes (1899–1985), member of the Legislative Council of Bermuda
- Ernest Richard Barnes (1906–1985), California politician
