= Milton Barnes =

Milton Barnes may refer to:

- Milton Barnes (actor), Canadian television and film actor
- Milton Barnes (basketball) (born 1957), American basketball player
- Milton Barnes (composer) (1931–2001), Canadian classical music composer
- Milton Barnes (politician) (1830–1895), Ohio Secretary of State in the 1870s
