= Luther Barnes =

American musician

Luther Barnes (born March 10, 1954) is a record producer, director, songwriter, composer and lead singer of Luther Barnes and the Sunset Jubilaires and the Red Budd Gospel Choir.

== Biography ==
Barnes is an ordained minister & native son of Rocky Mount, North Carolina. He is the second eldest son to Faircloth Barnes, who wrote the famous "Rough Side of the Mountain." He was born on March 10, 1954, and has three brothers, Samuel Barnes (deceased), Melvin Barnes (Knightdale), Tony Bernard Barnes (Rocky Mount).

As an executive producer of gospel music, he has released over twenty-eight CDs. He has performed with gospel recording artists such as Shirley Caesar, Deborah Barnes, Kirk Franklin, Harvey Watkins and The Canton Spirituals, Lee Williams and the Spiritual QC's, Dorothy Norwood, John P. Kee, and the Mighty Clouds of Joy. In 2005 he recorded with the Brooklyn Tabernacle Choir on their release "I'm Amazed" Live. He sang the national anthem for Carolina Mudcats baseball game.

Barnes is currently the Senior Pastor & Founder of the Restoration Worship Center (Rocky Mount), Established in January 2014.

== Education ==
He is a graduate of the Nash-Rocky Mount Schools System and a retired teacher. A 1976 graduate of St. Augustine's College in Raleigh, North Carolina, he obtained a B.A. degree in Music Education. He was honored as a Distinguished Graduate in February 2008.

== Family ==
He is the son of the late Rev. FC Barnes and Willie Mae Barnes. He has two daughters. The eldest Bonita Barnes-Greene, who is married to Mark Greene, of which they have one son, Joshua. The youngest, Kimberly Davis, who is married to Eugene Davis, of which they have three children and one grandchild, MarQuayla, MarQuez, Mariah and JeVonni. Luther also has a host of family members, including: cousins: Deborah Barnes, Wanda Barnes and Lisa Barnes. He has many aunts and uncles, which include: Joyce Smith, Frances Walker, Leora Floyd, Haywood Barnes, Betty Phillips, James Barnes, Ernestine Phillips, the late William "Mann" Barnes, and Roy Barnes.

== Early years ==
At the age of nine, Barnes realized that he had a special gift from the Lord. He became the Director of the "On the Rise Youth Choir" at Red Budd Holy Church. In 1987, Barnes released his first album entitled, "See What the Lord has Done."

== Red Budd Gospel Choir ==
The choir is composed of members of the Barnes Family & members of the Red Budd Holy Church. Most notably, his cousin Deborah Barnes. Deborah Barnes is the lead female vocalist of the group, with her many talents. She has been mentored in the music ministry by her cousin, Luther and together Luther Barnes and Deborah Barnes share the fame in the song "I'm Still Holding On." Deborah Barnes is the leading female vocalist heard on most of his music and the music of his father. Deborah Barnes is known as a power house in the gospel music industry. The group also consist of Wanda Barnes (cousin), Lisa Barnes (cousin), Bonita Barnes-Greene (daughter), Sean Barnes (cousin), Debbie "Happy" Barnes (cousin/Deborah's daughter) and other members. They are highly recognized on the national charts. Some of their hits includes "I'm Still Holding On", "So Satisfied", "Spirit, Fall Fresh" (written by Luther's brother Melvin Barnes), "That Other Shore", "Somehow Someway", "No Matter How High I Get" (written by Bobby Womack) and many others. Their hit "Some How Some Way" was nominated for a 2007 Stellar Award. The choir's lead vocalist are notably Luther, Deborah & Wanda Barnes. The group has appeared and traveled across the United States, singing and ministering. Pastor Barnes, Deborah and other members of the group are still traveling the world singing today.

== Awards and nominations ==
As lead singer of Luther Barnes and the Sunset Jubilaires, Red Budd Gospel Choir and the President of Luther Barnes Song Ministries he has received the 1992 Vision Award, and the Stellar and GMWA Excellence Award. He was nominated for his performance on the Barnes Family 1999 release, A Live Reunion, for The Truth Magazine Award, for Best Traditional Male Vocalist, GMWA 2003 Excellence Awards for Best Traditional Male Vocalist, for a Grammy Award Nomination 2004, for a 2005 Stellar Award, and a Gospel Heritage Award. He was inducted into the International Gospel Music Hall of Fame in Detroit, Michigan, the 2006 Mississippi Gospel Award, and a 2007 Stellar Award nomination for Somehow, Someway, GMA Dove Award nominee 2003, Distinguished award from St Augustine College, February 2008, Key to the City of Brunswick, Georgia, January 2008. Key to the City of Chesapeake, Virginia March 2008. at the Virginia Classic of Chesapeake, Spring Gospel Showcase. He served as performer, judge and participant at the Virginia Annual Showcase 2006-2007. Since 1996, he has hosted The Annual North Carolina Fall Gospel Classic, held at Red Budd Holy Church, Rocky Mount, NC in early October.

== Discography ==
- When We All Get To Heaven (1983)
- He Cares (1984)
- From the Soul (1985)
- See What The Lord Has Done (1986)
- Oh My Lord (1988)
- So Satisfied (1989)
- It's Christmas Time Again (1989)
- Still Holding On (1990)
- An Invitation (1991)
- Enjoying Jesus (1993)
- Nothing Can Be Better (1993)
- A Live Celebration (1995)
- Lord You've Been Good (1995)
- Someone to Lean On (1996)
- Heaven On My Mind (1997)
- God's Promise (1997)
- Wherever I Go (2000)
- The Best of Luther Barnes & the Red Budd Gospel Choir (2000)
- Come Fly With Me (2002)
- It's Your Time (2003)
- Somehow Someway (2005)
- Christmas With Luther Barnes (2007)
- Another Level (2012)
- The Favor Of God (2016)
- Look To The Hills (2020)
- Lifetime (2026)
