= Jack Barnes (rugby league) =

English rugby league player

Playing information
Club
Years	Team	Pld	T	G	FG	P
1955–65	Castleford	93	3	102	0	213

Jack Barnes is a former professional rugby league player who played in the 1950s and 1960s. He played at club level for Castleford.

== Playing career ==
=== County League appearances ===
Jack Barnes played in Castleford's victory in the Yorkshire League during the 1964–65 season.
