= Linda L. Barnes =

American medical anthropologist

Linda L. Barnes (born 1953) is an American medical anthropologist, a professor of family medicine at Boston University School of Medicine, and in the Graduate Division of Religious Studies at Boston University. Her research specialties are the social and cultural history of Western responses to Chinese healing traditions, and the interdisciplinary study of cultural, religious, and therapeutic pluralism in the United States. She has been regularly cited as an authority in the use of religiously based therapeutic traditions.

== Biography ==
Barnes received her BA in American studies from Smith College, her Master of Theological Studies from Harvard Divinity School, and her M.A. and Ph.D. from Harvard University in comparative religion and the allied field of medical anthropology. Mentored by historian and comparative religion scholar John B. Carman, Chinese religion scholar Tu Weiming, and medical anthropologist Arthur Kleinman, her early ethnographic work centered on Chinese healing practices in the United States, particularly in the region of Boston, Massachusetts. Her subsequent research explores relationships between cultural, religious/spiritual, and therapeutic pluralism—particularly in the United States—and complementary and alternative and integrative medicine.

Since 1999, Barnes has been a member of the faculty of Boston University School of Medicine (BUSM), where she founded and directed an urban ethnographic program—the Boston Healing Landscape Project (BHLP), a program for the study of religions, medicines, and healing funded by the Ford Foundation from 2001 to 2007. The BHLP's research focused on complementary and alternative medicine among the culturally complex patient communities in the Boston area. In 2007, with Lance Laird, she co-founded the Master of Science Program in medical anthropology and cross-cultural practice, in the Division of Graduate Medical Sciences at BUSM.

== Academic work ==
Barnes has published her ethnographic work in leading medical anthropology journals such as Culture, Medicine & Psychiatry, Medical Anthropology, Medical Anthropology Quarterly, and Social Science & Medicine. Her historical scholarship appears in her book Needles, Herbs, Gods, and Ghosts: China, Healing, and the West to 1848 (Harvard University Press, 2005). This anthropologically influenced cultural history examines how understandings of medicine, religion, race, and the body informed how Westerners in both Europe and later the U.S. understood and responded to the Chinese and their healing traditions from the thirteenth century through 1848.

More recently, she published Chinese Medicine and Healing: An Illustrated History (co-edited with TJ Hinrichs, Harvard University Press, 2013). She is currently writing a book on the cultural and social history of Chinese medicine and healing traditions in the United States, beginning in 1849 and continuing up through the present. As part of this project, Barnes has conducted fieldwork funded by the National Library of Medicine, and gathered hundreds of oral histories in regions throughout the United States, while also building an archive of related source materials.

A second major scholarly area to which Barnes has contributed is the interdisciplinary and cross-cultural study of relationships between religious, medical, and therapeutic traditions. She founded the "Religions, Medicines, and Healing Group" program unit of the American Academy of Religion (AAR) in 2002, and served as co-chair until 2010, when she moved to the group's steering committee. Her related books include Religion and Healing in America (co-edited with Susan S. Sered, Oxford University, 2005); and Teaching Religion and Healing (co-edited with Ines Talamantez, Oxford University, 2006). She also co-edited a series with Sered on religion and healing, for Praeger Press, a division of Greenwood. More recently, she published New Geographies of Religion and Healing: States of the Field, a monograph on the state of the history and more recent developments in this interdisciplinary area of study.

For ten years, Barnes served as the consultant to faculty-development workshops, sponsored by the AAR and funded by the Lilly Endowment, the Luce Foundation, and the National Endowment for the Humanities, for faculty in religious studies. In addition to her teaching at BUSM, she has taught courses on religiously grounded healing traditions at Harvard University, Harvard Divinity School, Brown University, and Northeastern University, and has received multiple teaching awards for her work with students.

Barnes served as the regional director of the New England/Maritimes Region of the American Academy of Religion, and a member of the AAR board of directors, from 2002 to 2008.

Barnes's expertise in the field of Chinese medicine in the U.S. has resulted in her being invited to speak to local, national, and international audiences. She has served as an expert reviewer for the National Institutes of Health, and the National Center for Complementary and Alternative Medicine.

== Publications ==
=== Books written ===
- Needles, Herbs, Gods, and Ghosts: China, Healing and the West to 1848. Harvard University Press, 2005.
- Variations on a Teaching/Learning Workshop: Pedagogy and Faculty Development in Religious Studies. Scholars Press, 1999.

=== Books edited ===
- Chinese Medicine and Healing: An Illustrated History. Ed. TJ Hinrichs and Linda Barnes. Harvard University Press, 2013. (Currently being translated into Chinese by Zhejiang University Press, Hangzhou, China)
- Teaching Religion and Healing. Ed. Linda L. Barnes and Inés Talamántez. Oxford University Press, 2006.
- Religion and Healing In America. Ed. Linda L. Barnes and Susan S. Sered. Oxford University Press, 2004.

=== Selected peer-reviewed articles ===
- "New Geographies of Religion and Healing: States of the Field. Practical Matters 4.Spring (2011):1-82.
- "Cultural Messages Under the Skin: Practitioner Decisions to Engage in Chinese Medicine. Medical Anthropology 28.2 (2009): 141–165.
- "Five Ways of Rethinking the Normal: Reflections. Religion & Theology (Theme Issue: Theology, HIV/AIDS and Public Policy in Africa). 14.1–2 (2007): 68–83.
- “American Acupuncture and Efficacy: Meanings and Their Points of Insertion.” Medical Anthropology Quarterly 19.3 (2005): 239–266.
- ____, et al. “Integrating Complementary and Alternative Medicine into Pediatric Training.” Pediatric Annals 33.4 (2004): 257–263.
- ____, and Joan Martin. “Introduction: Religion and Empire.” Journal of the American Academy of Religion 71.1 (2003): 3–12.
- “The Acupuncture Wars: The Professionalizing of American Acupuncture – A View from Massachusetts.” Medical Anthropology 22.3 (2003): 261–301.
- ____, and Gregory A. Plotnikoff. “Fadiman and Beyond: The Dangers of Extrapolation.” Bioethics Forum 17.1 (2001): 32–40.
- ____, and Grove Harris. “Religious Pluralism and Culturally Competent Care.” The Park Ridge Center Bulletin November/December (2001): 7–8.
- ____, et al. “Spirituality, Religion and Pediatrics: Intersecting Worlds of Healing.” Pediatrics 106.4 (2000): 899–908.
- “The Psychologizing of Chinese Healing Practices in the United States.” Culture, Medicine and Psychiatry 22.4 (1998): 413–443.

She has also published chapters in a number of books and collected works.
