= Paul Barnes =

Paul Barnes may refer to:

- Polo Barnes (Paul D. Barnes, 1901–1981), American clarinetist and saxophonist
- Paul Barnes (pastor) (born 1954), former senior pastor of Grace Chapel in Douglas County, Colorado
- Paul Barnes (pianist) (born 1961), American pianist and Liszt specialist
- Paul Barnes (footballer) (born 1967), English footballer
- Paul Barnes (designer) (born 1970), British graphic designer and typographer
- Paul Barnes (songwriter) (1870–1922), vaudeville comedic actor, singer, pianist, and songwriter
- Paul Barnes (broadcaster) (1939–2025), British broadcaster and journalist
