= Aaron Barnes =

Aaron Barnes may refer to:

- Aaron Barnes (cricketer) (born 1971), New Zealand cricketer
- Aaron Barnes (footballer) (born 1996), English footballer
