= Ronald Barnes =

Ronald, Ron or Ronnie Barnes may refer to:

- Ronald Barnes, 3rd Baron Gorell (1884–1963), British peer, Liberal politician, poet, author and newspaper editor
- Ronald Barnes (carillonist) (1927–1997), American carillonist
- Ronald Barnes (tennis) (1941–2002), Brazilian tennis player
- Ron Barnes (footballer) (1936–1991), English footballer
- Ron Barnes (umpire) (born 1958), American former baseball umpire
- Ronnie Barnes (American football) (born 1952), American football athletic trainer
