= Michael Barnes =

Michael Barnes or Mike Barnes may refer to:

== Politicians ==
- Michael Barnes (British politician) (1932–2018), British Labour MP
- Michael Barnes (North Carolina politician) (born 1970/1971), acting mayor of Charlotte, North Carolina
- Michael D. Barnes (born 1943), lawyer and former U.S. Representative from Maryland

== Sportspeople ==
- Mike Barnes (American football, born 1944), American football player
- Mike Barnes (American football, born 1950), American football player
- Michael Barnes (cricketer) (born 1985), English cricketer
- Michael Barnes (footballer) (born 1988), English footballer
- Michael Barnes (judoka) (born 1973), American judoka
- Michael Barnes (motorcyclist) (born 1968), American motorcycle racer

== Characters ==
- Mike Barnes (Karate Kid), fictional character from the 1989 movie The Karate Kid Part III, and Cobra Kai, Season 5
- Mike Barnes (Hollyoaks), a fictional character on British soap opera, Hollyoaks

== Others ==
- Michael Barnes (arts administrator) (1932–2008), director of the Belfast Festival at Queens and the Grand Opera House, Belfast
- Michael Barnes (musician), lead singer of Christian rock band RED
