= Justice Barnes =

Justice Barnes may refer to:

- Alanson H. Barnes (1817–1890), associate justice of the South Dakota Supreme Court
- Charles P. Barnes (1869–1951), associate justice and chief justice of the Maine Supreme Judicial Court
- John Barnes (judge) (1859–1919), associate justice of the Wisconsin Supreme Court
- John B. Barnes (1846–1921), associate justice of the Nebraska Supreme Court
- Richmond P. Barnes (1859–1946), associate justice of the New Mexico Supreme Court
- Wilson K. Barnes (1907–1997), associate justice of the Maryland Court of Appeals

== See also ==
- Paul D. Barns (1894–1973), associate justice of the Florida Supreme Court
- Judge Barnes (disambiguation)
