= Arthur Barnes =

Arthur Barnes may refer to:

- Arthur Barnes (monsignor) (1861–1936), English Roman Catholic writer and university chaplain
- Arthur Barnes (Canadian politician) (1866–1956), educator and politician in Newfoundland
- Arthur Barnes (New Hampshire politician)
- Arthur K. Barnes (1909–1969), American science fiction writer
- Arthur P. Barnes (1930–2024), professor of music at Stanford University
