= Walter Barnes =

Walter, Walt, or Walley Barnes may refer to:

- Walley Barnes (1920–1975), Welsh footballer and broadcaster
- Walt Barnes (1918–1998), American football player and character actor
- Walt Barnes (defensive lineman) (born 1944), American football player
- Walter Barnes (musician) (1905–1940), American jazz clarinetist, saxophonist and bandleader
- Walter Barnes (politician) (1858–1933), Australian parliamentarian in Queensland
- Walter Barnes (sportswriter) (1860–1940), American sportswriter and sports editor in Boston

== See also ==
- Walter S. and Melissa E. Barnes House, Somerville, Massachusetts
