= Odell Barnes =

Odell Barnes may refer to:

- Odell Barnes (criminal) (1968–2000), Texas man convicted of the 1989 murder of Helen Bass
- Odell Barnes (entrepreneur) (born 1952), buyer of foreclosed homes in the United States
