= Matthew Barnes =

British businessman

Matthew Campbell Barnes (born 7 May 1973) is a British businessman. He was the Chief Executive of Aldi UK & Ireland, joining the company as a graduate in 1997. He went on to serve as the UK Chief Executive of Tesco. From 2025 to present he has been President of Footlocker international.

== See also ==
- Christian Härtnagel, UK Managing Director of Lidl
- List of supermarket chains in the United Kingdom
