= Fred Barnes (baseball) =

- Pitcher
- Batted: Unknown Threw: Unknown

Negro league baseball debut
- 1924, for the Washington Potomacs

Last appearance
- 1924, for the Washington Potomacs
- Stats at Baseball Reference

Teams
- Washington Potomacs (1924)

Fred Barnes was an American professional baseball pitcher in the Negro leagues. He played with the Washington Potomacs in 1924.
