= Tommy Barnes =

American football player and coach (1951–2013)

Biographical details
- Born: April 12, 1951; Fordyce, Arkansas, U.S.
- Died: March 7, 2013 (aged 61); Monticello, Arkansas, U.S.

Playing career
- 1969–1971: Arkansas A&M
- Position: Fullback

Coaching career (HC unless noted)
- 1980–1984: Arkansas–Monticello (assistant)
- 1985–1996: Arkansas–Monticello

Head coaching record
- Overall: 69–53–1 (college); 98–14–4 (high school)
- Tournaments: 2–2 (NAIA D-I playoffs)

Accomplishments and honors

Championships
- 1 AIC (1993)

Tommy Wayne Barnes (April 12, 1951 – March 7, 2013) was an American football player and coach. He served as the head football coach at the University of Arkansas at Monticello from 1985 to 1996, compiling a record of 69–53–1. Barnes also had a successful tenure as a high school football coach at Montrose Academy in Montrose, Arkansas.

== Head coaching record ==
=== College ===
Year	Team	Overall	Conference	Standing	Bowl/playoffs
Arkansas–Monticello Weevils (Arkansas Intercollegiate Conference) (1985–1994)
1985	Arkansas–Monticello	7–2	5–2	T–3rd	
1986	Arkansas–Monticello	6–3	5–2	T–2nd	
1987	Arkansas–Monticello	6–4	2–4	T–5th	
1988	Arkansas–Monticello	10–2	5–1	2nd	L NAIA Division I Quarterfinal
1989	Arkansas–Monticello	4–6	1–5	T–6th	
1990	Arkansas–Monticello	5–5	1–5	6th	
1991	Arkansas–Monticello	2–8	1–5	T–6th	
1992	Arkansas–Monticello	6–4	4–2	T–2nd	
1993	Arkansas–Monticello	8–4	4–0	1st	L NAIA Division I Quarterfinal
1994	Arkansas–Monticello	4–4–1	2–2	3rd	
Arkansas–Monticello Weevils (Gulf South Conference) (1995–1996)
1995	Arkansas–Monticello	6–5	3–3	7th	
1996	Arkansas–Monticello	5–6	3–5	T–7th	
Arkansas–Monticello:		69–53–1	36–36		
Total:		69–53–1			
National championship Conference title Conference division title or championship game berth
