= Jim Kenagy =

George James Kenagy
- Born: 1945 (age 79–80); Los Angeles, California
- Education: Crescenta Valley High School (1963) B.A., Zoology, Pomona College (1967) Ph.D., Zoology, UCLA (1972)
- Known for: Research in Ecophysiology

George James Kenagy (born 1945, in Los Angeles, California) is known for his research in ecophysiology and behavior of small mammals.

== Education ==
Jim Kenagy graduated from Crescenta Valley High School in 1963, and he graduated with a degree in Zoology in 1967 at Pomona College in Claremont, California. Then he achieved his Ph.D. in Zoology from the University of California in Los Angeles in 1972. He held postdocs in Germany (at the Max Planck Institute for Behavioral Physiology), at UCLA, and at UC San Diego. In 1976, he joined the Department of Zoology at the University of Washington in Seattle, which became the Department of Biology in 2002. In 1995, he also became Curator of Mammals at the Burke Museum of Natural History and Culture.[5]

== Career ==
As a postdoc at Max Planck, Kenagy investigated daily rhythms and seasonal reproductive patterns in desert rodents. Kenagy has conducted research in Australia, South America, and the University of California, Berkeley's Museum of Vertebrate Zoology. His research has encompassed ecophysiology and behavior, and more recently has included population biology, biogeography, and evolution of mammals. His occupation revolves around the continual research of biogeography and evolution of mammalian populations, and training graduate students at the University of Washington and associate with the Burke Museum.[5]

== Present ==
As the curator of the Burke Museum in Seattle, Washington, Kenagy oversaw the research of graduate students including projects in:

- Biogeography of Pacific Northwest Mammals
- Tracking the History of Northwest Mouse Populations with their Genetic Signatures
- Local vs. Widespread Population Structure of Jumping Mice on the Olympic Peninsula
- Desert Ground Squirrel Adaptation from Mexico to Oregon
- Tracking a Rare Marsupial in Chile's Southern Rain Forest
- Mammals of Sichuan Province, China

== Titles of selected publications ==
- Historical demography and genetic structure of sister species: deermice (Peromyscus) in the North American temperate rain forest
- Genetic structure of desert ground squirrels over a 20-degree-latitude transect from Oregon through the Baja California peninsula
- Conservation genetics of endangered flying squirrels (Glaucomys) from the Appalachian mountains of eastern North America
- Historical biogeography and post-glacial recolonization of South American temperate rain forest by the relictual marsupial Dromiciops gliroides
- Nuclear and mitochondrial DNA reveal contrasting evolutionary processes in populations of deer mice (Peromyscus maniculatus)
- Influence of montane isolation and refugia on population structure of Sorex palustris in western North America
- Biogeography and Population Genetics of Peromyscus maniculatus in the American West
- Detecting Natural Selection in Pacific Northwest Deer Mice: An Integrative Approach
- Journal of Mammalogy: Meanderings in the Bush. Natural History Explorations in Outback Australia.
