= Ralph Barnes =

Ralph Barnes may refer to:

- Ralph Barnes (priest) (fl. 1775–1820), 18th century British Archdeacon of Totnes
- Ralph Barnes (journalist) (1899–1940), American war correspondent
- Ralph Mosser Barnes (1900–1984), American industrial engineer
- Ralph Barnes (died 1537), English monk and Catholic martyr
- SS Ralph Barnes
