= Warren Barnes =

Warren Barnes may refer to:

- Warren Barnes (swimmer) (born 1985), Canadian swimmer
- Warren Barnes (cricketer) (born 1992), South African-born New Zealand cricketer
- Warren Delabere Barnes (1865–1911), British colonial administrator
- Warren Barnes (1951–2021), a 69-year old homeless man who was murdered
