= Lucy Barnes =

Lucy Barnes may refer to:

- Lucy Barnes (writer) (1780–1809), American author of The Female Christian
- Lucy Barnes Brown (1859–1921), early American amateur golfer
- Lacy Barnes-Mileham (born 1964), U.S. track and field Olympian
