= Lucius Barnes =

American painter

- Born: August 1, 1819; Middletown, Connecticut, U.S.
- Died: September 9, 1836 (aged 17); U.S.
- Occupation: Painter
- Known for: Painting portraits of his grandmother Martha

Lucius Barnes (August 1, 1819 – September 9, 1836) was an American painter.

Barnes was born in Middletown, Connecticut, the seventh child of Elizur and Clarissa Barnes. At the age of four, he received an injury to his spinal cord. For the rest of his life, he used a wheelchair, retaining only the use of his hands and toes; nevertheless, he was able to paint at least seven watercolor portraits of his grandmother, Martha Atkins Barns, as well as a piece depicting three children and a dog adrift on an ice floe. All of the portraits share similar characteristics. Each depicts the subject in profile, wearing oval eyeglasses, a black long-sleeved dress, a shawl, and a white cap with a black bow. She is either walking or sitting in a chair; often she is seen smoking a pipe or reading a Bible. Usually, she is posed on top of some kind of mound. The purpose of the portraits is unknown; at least one was found inserted into a copy of her biography, Memoir of Mrs. Martha Barnes, as a frontispiece; the book was written by John Cookson, pastor of Middletown's First Baptist Church, and published in 1834. It has been posited that some may have been made as gifts for family members as well.

Two of the portraits of Martha Barnes are currently owned by the Fenimore Art Museum. The depiction of the children on the ice, titled Adrift, was in the collection of Arthur and Sybil Kern before being sold at auction in 2018 for $246.
