= Mary Barnes =

Mary Barnes may refer to:

- Mary Barnes Cabell (1815–1900), American freedwoman
- Mary Sheldon Barnes (1850–1898), American educator and historian
- Mary Barnes (artist) (1923–2001), English artist and writer
