= Lizzie Barnes =

American politician and businesswoman (1891–1969)

Erma Elizabeth "Lizzie" Barnes was an American politician and businesswoman from Illinois.

She was born March 13, 1891, in Albany, Kentucky and raised in White County, Illinois where she was a lifelong resident. She had two children. She was elected to the Illinois House of Representatives in 1938 and served a single term. She served on the Agriculture; Banks and Building and Loan Associations; Charities and Corrections; Parks; and Waterways Committees, and the Committee to Visit Educational Institutions. With Maud N. Peffers and Lottie Holman O'Neill, Barnes was one of only three women in the Illinois House during the 60th General Assembly. She was widowed by the time she was elected to the Illinois House. Barnes lost reelection in 1940. She remained the only woman to represent a district in "deep southern" Illinois until Terri Bryant took office in 2015. She ran for the Democratic nomination for Illinois Senate in 1948, but lost to Kent Lewis.

After her service in the legislature, she remained active in the civic and business communities. She served as the City Treasurer for Carmi, Illinois from 1949 to 1957. She also served as the Chair of the local Democratic Party in White County, Illinois. She died November 1, 1969.
