= Harry Barnes (footballer) =

Australian rules footballer, born 1903

Personal information
- Full name: Henry Joseph Barnes
- Born: 19 April 1903; North Melbourne, Victoria
- Died: 27 June 2001 (aged 98)
- Original team: Leopold
- Height: 180 cm (5 ft 11 in)
- Weight: 84 kg (185 lb)

Playing career^{1}
| Years | Club | Games (Goals) |
| 1926 | North Melbourne | 8 (2) |
- ^{1} Playing statistics correct to the end of 1926.

Henry Joseph Barnes (19 April 1903 – 27 June 2001) was an Australian rules footballer who played with North Melbourne in the Victorian Football League (VFL).
