= Danny Barnes =

Danny Barnes may refer to:

- Danny Barnes (baseball) (born 1989), American baseball player
- Danny Barnes (musician) (born 1961), American musician
- Danny Barnes (rugby league), English rugby league footballer
- Danny Barnes (rugby union) (born 1989), Irish rugby union footballer
