= Jerome Barnes =

American politician

Member of the Missouri House of Representatives from the 28th district
- In office January 2017 – January 2025
- Succeeded by: Donna Barnes

Personal details
- Born: Mississippi, U.S.
- Party: Democratic
- Children: 3
- Education: Longview Community College

Military service
- Branch/service: United States Army

Jerome Barnes is an American politician who was a member of the Missouri House of Representatives from the 28th district. Elected in 2016, he assumed office in January 2017.

He was succeeded in office by his wife Donna Barnes.

== Early life and education ==
Barnes was born in Mississippi. He attended Longview Community College (now Metropolitan Community College) in the Kansas City metropolitan area.

== Career ==
Prior to his career in politics, Barnes served in the United States Army and worked for the United States Postal Service. In 2016, Barnes defeated Republican nominee Bill Van Buskirk in the November general election for 28th district in the Missouri House of Representatives. He defeated Libertarian nominee Jeremy Utterback in 2018 and ran unopposed in 2020.

== Electoral history ==
Missouri House of Representatives Primary Election, August 2, 2016, District 28
| Party | Candidate | Votes | % | ±% |
|---|---|---|---|---|
| Democratic | Jerome Barnes | 1,212 | 39.47% | |
| Democratic | Jim Aziere | 947 | 30.84% | |
| Democratic | Diane Krizek | 582 | 18.95% | |
| Democratic | Josh Greene | 202 | 6.58% | |
| Democratic | Pat Riehle | 128 | 4.17% | |
| Total votes | | 3,071 | 100.00% | |

Missouri House of Representatives Election, November 8, 2016, District 28
| Party | Candidate | Votes | % | ±% |
|---|---|---|---|---|
| Democratic | Jerome Barnes | 9,143 | 60.13% | |
| Republican | William (Bill) Van Buskirk | 6,062 | 39.87% | |
| Total votes | | 15,205 | 100.00% | |

Missouri House of Representatives Primary Election, August 7, 2018, District 28
| Party | Candidate | Votes | % | ±% |
|---|---|---|---|---|
| Democratic | Jerome Barnes | 3,769 | 82.06% | +42.59 |
| Democratic | Shea Tan Henderson | 824 | 17.94% | n/a |
| Total votes | | 4,593 | 100.00% | |

Missouri House of Representatives Election, November 6, 2018, District 28
| Party | Candidate | Votes | % | ±% |
|---|---|---|---|---|
| Democratic | Jerome Barnes | 9,399 | 78.16% | +18.03 |
| Libertarian | Jeremy Utterback | 2,627 | 21.84% | +21.84 |
| Total votes | | 12,026 | 100.00% | |

Missouri House of Representatives Election, November 3, 2020, District 28
| Party | Candidate | Votes | % | ±% |
|---|---|---|---|---|
| Democratic | Jerome Barnes | 13,128 | 100.00% | +21.84 |
| Total votes | | 13,128 | 100.00% | |

Missouri House of Representatives Election, November 8, 2022, District 28
| Party | Candidate | Votes | % | ±% |
|---|---|---|---|---|
| Democratic | Jerome Barnes | 6,917 | 65.29% | −34.71 |
| Republican | Jennell Houts | 3,677 | 34.71% | +34.71 |
| Total votes | | 10,594 | 100.00% | |

== Personal life ==
Barnes and his wife, Donna, have three children. They live in Raytown, Missouri.
