= Scott Barnes =

Scott Barnes may refer to:

- Scott Barnes (athletic director) (born 1962), American athletic director
- Scott Barnes (baseball) (born 1987), American professional baseball player
- Scottie Barnes (born 2001), American basketball player
