= James Hector Barnes =

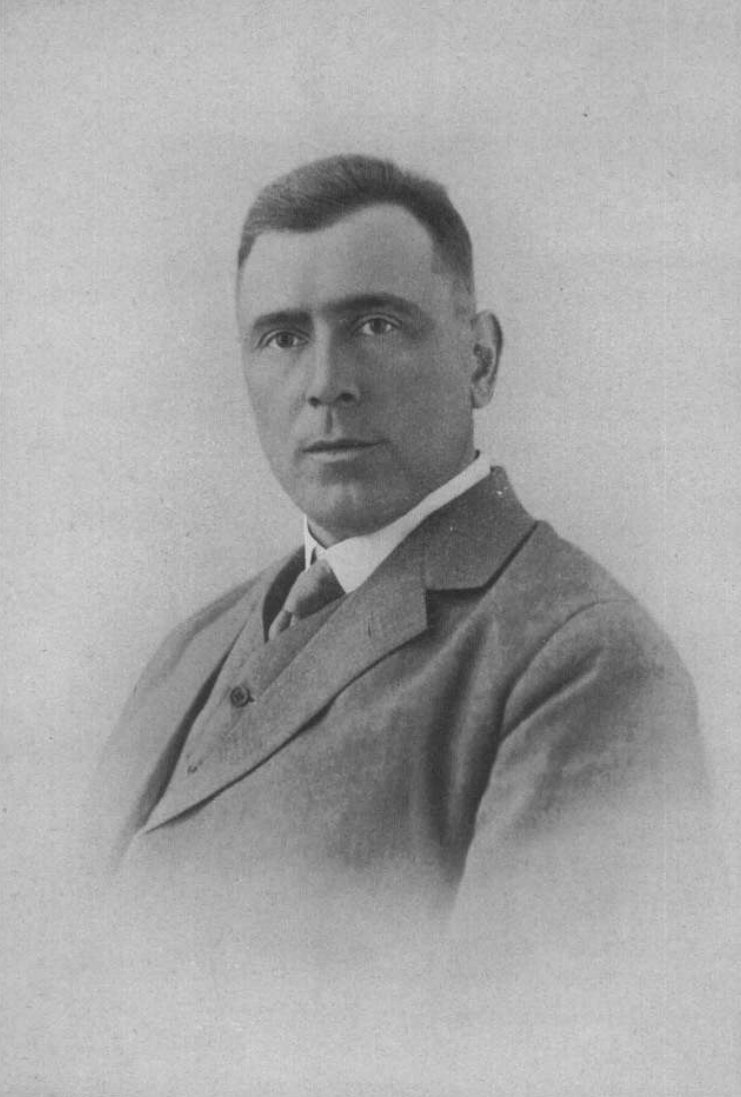

James Hector Barnes (1879 – 2 June 1917) was a chemist who worked as a chemistry professor at Lyallpur College (now in Pakistan) and was briefly Imperial Agricultural Chemist in India.

Barnes was born in King's Norton, Birmingham, the son of Joshua Barnes. He apprenticed at the Southall brothers and Barclay chemical factory in Birmingham before going to the University of Birmingham. He studied under Percy Frankland and Poynting and received a BSc. He worked for some time as the Worcester County Analyst. He went to India in 1906 and worked at Lyallpur, Punjab, as an agricultural chemist and professor of chemistry at the college after being selected by James Mollison. In 1908 he worked as a principal at the Lyallpur College where he set up a laboratory. The laboratory was among the best equipped for its time and was visited by Smithells and Wyndham Dunstan of the Imperial Institute who appreciated the work done. He worked on a diverse range of problems including reclaiming saline soils, problems relating to the sugar industry, the tea industry, food contamination, and on chemical control of insect pests. He married Nora, daughter of Colonel Francis Thomas Ebden in 1914. In March 1917 he moved to the Agricultural Research Institute at Pusa as Imperial Agricultural Chemist. He died from an enteric fever at Pusa at the age of 38.
