= Susan Barnes =

Susan Barnes may refer to:

- Sue Barnes (born 1952), Canadian politician
- Susan Barnes (computing), Apple Computer executive
- Susan Barnes (actress), in the TV series Titus
- Susan Barnes Carson (born 1941), née Susan Barnes, American serial killer
- Sue Barnes, a character in Peak Practice, played by Amelda Brown
- Suzanne Paul (née Susan Barnes, 1956), English-born New Zealand television personality
