= Donna Barnes =

American politician

Member of the Missouri House of Representatives from the 28th district
- Incumbent
- Assumed office January 8, 2025
- Succeeded by: Jerome Barnes

Personal details
- Party: Democratic

Donna Barnes is an American politician who was elected member of the Missouri House of Representatives for the 28th district in 2024.

She worked for the United States Postal Service for 35 years in the Kansas City area. Barnes is married to former House Representative Jerome Barnes.
