= Annie Barnes (academic) =

Swiss-English scholar

Annie Barnes (born Annie Madeleine Sessely; 15 April 1903 – 17 January 2003) was a Swiss-English scholar, Reader in French Literature at the University of Oxford, and an expert on Blaise Pascal.

== Career ==
Barnes was born in Geneva and took her doctorate at the University of Bern. Her initial employment in Oxford was at Somerville College and Lady Margaret Hall. She became Lecturer in French at St Anne's Society, Oxford, in 1947, and was one of the Founding Fellows when it was chartered as St Anne's College, Oxford in 1952. She was appointed University Reader in 1966. At retirement in 1971 she was appointed an Honorary Fellow of St Anne's. She died on 17 January 2003, aged 99.

== Publications ==
- Jean Le Clerc (1657–1736) et la République des lettres (1938)
- Lettres inédites de Jean Duvergier de Hauranne, Abbé de Saint-Cyran: le manuscrit de Munich (Cod. Gall. 691) et la vie d'Abraham (1962)
