= Jane Barnes =

Jane Barnes may refer to:

== People ==
- Jane Barnes (actress) (1910–1998), American film actress
- Jane Barnes (musician), wife of Australian musician Jimmy Barnes and frontwoman of the Jane Barnes Band
- Jane Barnes, barmaid who travelled to the Pacific Northwest with John MacDonald of Garth
- Jane M. Barnes (1928–2000), American politician who served in the Illinois House of Representatives

== Other uses ==
- Jane Barnes, an American brig captured by HMS Comus in 1813

== See also ==
- Jhane Barnes (born 1954), American fashion designer
