= Brandon Barnes (disambiguation) =

Brandon Barnes (born 1972) is an American musician and producer.

Brandon Barnes may also refer to:

- Brandon Barnes (baseball) (born 1986), American baseball outfielder
- Brandon Barnes (offensive lineman) (born 1985), American football offensive tackle
- Brandon Barnes (linebacker) (born 1981), former American football linebacker
- Brandon Barnes, frequent songwriting partner of American singer Brian McKnight
