= Barry Barnes =

Barry Barnes may refer to:

- S. Barry Barnes (born 1943), British professor of sociology
- Barry K. Barnes (1906–1965), British actor
