= George Barnes (footballer, born 1876) =

English footballer

Personal information
- Full name: George Barnes
- Date of birth: 26 September 1876
- Place of birth: Liverpool, England
- Date of death: 1946 (aged 69–70)
- Position: Winger

Senior career*
Years	Team	Apps	(Gls)
1896–1897	All Saints (Liverpool)		
1896–1897	Rock Ferry		
1897–1898	Darwen	31	(6)
1898–1899	Bolton Wanderers	9	(1)
1899–1900	Portsmouth		
1900–1901	New Brighton Tower	7	(1)
1902–1903	Aberavon		
1903–1904	Glossop	5	(0)
1904–1906	Tranmere Rovers		
1904	Hoylake		
Total		52	(8)
- * Club domestic league appearances and goals

George Barnes (26 September 1876 – 1946) was an English footballer who played in the Football League for Bolton Wanderers, Darwen, Glossop and New Brighton Tower.
