= Tamika Barnes =

American librarian

- Education: University of North Carolina at Chapel Hill (B.S., Biology, 1997); North Carolina Central University (M.L.S., 1999)
- Occupation: Librarian
- Years active: 1997–present
- Employer: Georgia State University
- Known for: 2026–2027 president-elect of the American Library Association
- Title: Associate Dean of Perimeter College Library Services

Tamika Barnes, associate dean of Perimeter College Library Services at Georgia State University in Atlanta, is 2026–2027 president-elect of the American Library Association.

== Education and career ==
Barnes earned a degree in biology from the University of North Carolina at Chapel Hill in 1997. She was awarded the ALA Spectrum Scholarship in 1997 and the MLS degree from North Carolina Central University in 1999.

She was North Carolina State University engineering services librarian from 1997-2003. She was head of reference and information literacy at North Carolina A&T State from 2003-2005. Barnes was the library director at the US Environmental Protection Agency library in the Research Triangle Park from 2005-2013.

In 2013 Barnes was appointed library director for the Dunwoody Campus of Georgia Perimeter College which consolidated with Georgia State University in January 2016. She then became associate dean, Perimeter College Library Services at Georgia State University Library.

Barnes is an adjunct professor for Syracuse University School of Information Studies.

== Professional activity ==
=== National ===
Barnes is president-elect of the American Library Association for 2026-2027. She served on the Executive Board of the American Library Association from 2015-2018; as ALA Councilor; on the ALA Spectrum Advisory Committee and other leadership committees.

For the Association of College and Research Libraries Barnes served on the Professional Development Coordinating Committee and Spectrum Scholars Mentors Task Force.

For the Special Libraries Association she served on the Board of Directors and as Science and Technology Division Membership Chair.

=== State ===
Barnes is 2026 Georgia Library Association President. She was Georgia ALA Chapter Councilor from 2018-2020 and chair, Special Libraries Division, Chair 2013-2017.

For the North Carolina Library Association Barnes served on the Leadership Institute Planning Committee and as Director of the Roundtable for Ethnic Minority Concerns. She was also active in the Special Libraries Association, North Carolina Chapter as President in 2011.

== Honors ==
- UCLA Senior Library Fellows 2024
- Georgia State University Leadership Academy for Faculty 2022
- Georgia Library Association Bob Richardson Memorial Award 2021
- Black Caucus of the American Library Association Library Advocacy Award 2017
- North Carolina Library Association Round Table for Ethnic Minority Concerns Roadbuilders’ Award 2013
- Special Libraries Association, North Carolina Chapter Meritorious Award 2009
- Special Libraries Association Diversity Leadership and Development Award 2005
- Special Libraries President Award 2004
- Special Libraries Association, North Carolina Chapter, Horizon Award 2002
