= Frank Barnes =

Frank Barnes may refer to:

- Frank Barnes (left-handed pitcher) (1900–1967), American baseball pitcher
- Frank Barnes (right-handed pitcher) (1926–2014), African American baseball pitcher
- Frank Barnes (actor) (1875–after 1949), American actor
- Frank Barnes (politician) (1904–1952), Australian politician
- Frank C. Barnes (1918–1992), American lawyer, author and cartridge designer

== See also ==
- Honey Barnes (1900–1981), American baseball catcher
- Francis Barnes (disambiguation)
- Frank C. Barnes House in Portland, Oregon, U.S.
