= Derrick Barnes =

Derrick Barnes may refer to:

- Derrick Barnes (author), American author
- Derrick Barnes (American football) (born 1999), American football linebacker
