= Christopher Barnes (cricketer) =

English cricketer and British Army officer

Personal information
- Full name: Christopher Hewetson Barnes
- Born: 7 February 1833; Marylebone, Middlesex, England
- Died: 28 September 1884 (aged 51); Cairo, Egypt
- Batting: Unknown
- Relatives: Henry Barnes (brother)

Domestic team information
- Years: Team
- 1860: Marylebone Cricket Club

Career statistics
Competition	First-class
Matches	4
Runs scored	17
Batting average	2.83
100s/50s	–/–
Top score	9
Catches/stumpings	–/–
- Source: Cricinfo, 18 April 2021

Christopher Hewetson Barnes (7 February 1833 – 28 September 1884) was an English first-class cricketer and British Army officer.

The son of the surgeon Christopher Hewetson Barnes, he was born at Marylebone in February 1833. A career soldier, he was an officer in the Royal Artillery and served in British India with the Bengal Artillery. Barnes was seriously wounded by a bullet to his right breast on 10 November 1857, during the rebel siege of Neemuch Fort in Rajputana, which was a part of the Indian Mutiny. He recovered from his wounds and returned to England, where he played first-class cricket for the Marylebone Cricket Club on four occasions in 1860, against Oxford University and Cambridge University, in addition to county opponents in the form of Kent and Sussex. He had little success in these four matches, scoring just 17 runs.

Continuing to serve in the Bengal Artillery, he was promoted to second captain in October 1861. He was made a captain in February 1870, with promotion to major following in July 1872. Holding the rank of lieutenant colonel by 1882, he was promoted to colonel in December 1882. Barnes was appointed to the staff to command the Royal Artillery in Egypt in July 1884. His command in Egypt was however short-lived, with Barnes falling ill from dysentery. He died on 28 September 1884, while being nursed at General Stephenson's Cairo house. He was survived by his son, Henry, who also played first-class cricket.
