= James Barnes (television director) =

British television director

James Barnes is a British video director from Portsmouth, England.

== Early life ==
Barnes studied Sport & Exercise Science at the University of Brighton, and Broadcast Journalism at Highbury College, Portsmouth after winning a place on the BBC News Sponsorship Scheme.

== Career ==
During and after University he worked as a professional tennis coach in Brighton, Portsmouth and Greece. He became an intern at Octagon in the Athlete Representation department with clients including Frank Lampard, Patrick Vieira, Jason Robinson, Anna Kournikova and Paula Radcliffe. Then, whilst on the BBC News course he worked for them on BBC Radio 4's The Today Programme and in BBC News 24's Sport department.

After six months as a Video Journalist at the Press Association, Barnes became a researcher with MTV News. He progressed through to Senior Producer of News, and Live Music & Documentary director.

In 2009 he came up with the concept for MTV Staying Alive's annual documentary featuring Travis McCoy of the Gym Class Heroes. McCoy travels to South Africa, Philippines and India to visit Staying Alive Foundation grantees, seeing the work they do in the fight against HIV & AIDS. The documentary will be premiered on MTV and MTV HD on World AIDS day 2009. The charity track that McCoy is making as a result of the trip will be released at the MTV Europe Music Awards in Berlin in November 2009.

In 2010 he shot and directed Pete Doherty : In 24 Hours which garnered much media attention and spawned a series.

From 2009 to 2012 he was a member of the RTS Futures committee, chaired by Alex Graham and Peter Bazalgette.

In 2011 Barnes directed MTV's documentary special to celebrate the life of Amy Winehouse.

Between 2012 and 2019 Barnes directed the live Backstage Show from the MTV EMA in Frankfurt, Amsterdam, Glasgow, Milan, Rotterdam, London, Bilbao and Seville. Hosts included Tim Kash, Laura Whitmore, Will Best, Ariana Grande, Sway Calloway, Becca Dudley and Harriet Rose.

In 2014 he moved to a full time role at Globe Productions, part of Universal Music Group UK. Here he combined developing ideas and treatment writing with producing and directing content for broadcasters, brands and artists. This included the Live Colourful Life collaboration between Lethal Bizzle, David Arnold, Sinead Harnett and Bulmers in 2015, and Future Sounds for Channel 4 in 2016, featuring Mistajam, Blossoms, Alessia Cara, Barns Courtney and Izzy Bizu.

He became a freelance director in June 2017, specialising in music video and multi-cam music, documentaries and commercial/branded content.

Since then he has written and directed content for music artists including Ellie Goulding, Dave, The 1975, Skrillex and Lewis Capaldi.

Commercial clients include Gulfstream, Gore-Tex, Hennessy, Carling, Vans, WorkDay, Warner Music and platforms include - Apple Music, LADbible, VEVO, BAFTA and MTV

== Filmography ==
- Assistant Producer
- Pick Me MTV
- MTV News
- Producer
- London 2012 Olympics (Hockey)

Director

- Staying Alive: Travis McCoy’s Unbeaten Track
- An MTV Special: A Tribute To Amy Winehouse
- MTV Live: Little Mix
- MTV Live: The Vamps
- MTV Live: Union J
- MTV Live: Conor Maynard
- MTV EMA: Backstage Live (2012, 2013, 2014, 2016, 2017, 2018, 2019)

Series Director

Pete Doherty In 24 Hours

Daisy Lowe In 24 Hours

Sarah Harding in 24 Hours

Kelly Osbourne in 24 Hours

Channel 4's Future Sound

Producer Director

  - Rihanna Making The Video – Shut Up And Drive
  - Backstage at the EMA’s 2007 with Joss Stone
  - Craig David Making The Video – ‘Let’s Dance’
  - Backstage at the EMA’s 2008 with Sugababes
  - Lil’ Wayne’s World
  - I Hate 2008
  - Harry Potter ‘Half Blood Prince’ VT for MTV Movie Awards 2009
  - Help For Haiti Now (London)
  - On Set With Nicole Scherzinger
  - On Set With The Vamps (2014, 2015)
  - On Set With Professor Green
