= Edward Barnes (poet and translator) =

Welsh educator, translator and poet

Edward Barnes (fl. c.1760–1795) was a Welsh educator, translator and poet.

Barnes was born in St Asaph, Denbighshire. He taught school in his hometown before moving to Montgomeryshire.

He converted to the Methodist faith, and translated and published Methodist sermons and documents. His published works include poems or carols that were included in William Hope's 1765 collection Cyfaill i'r Cymro, and translations such as poems of Rees Prichard, Myfyrdodau Hervey (meditations of James Hervey, 1785), and a sermon on the death of Selina Hastings, Countess of Huntingdon entitled Crown of Eternal Glory by Theophilus Priestley in 1792.
