= Albert Barnes =

Albert Barnes may refer to:

- Albert Barnes (boxer) (1913–1990), Welsh Olympic boxer
- Albert Barnes (theologian) (1798–1870), American theologian
- Albert C. Barnes (1872–1951), American chemist and art collector
- A. R. Barnes (1867–1944), Attorney General of Utah

== See also ==
- Bert Barnes (disambiguation)
