= Linda Diane Barnes =

American historian

L. Diane Barnes obtained her Ph.D. in History at West Virginia University and is an associate professor at Youngstown State University. She is the editor-in-chief of the academic journal Ohio History. Barnes is married to Benjamin Barnes.

She is the author, editor or co-editor of several books:

- The Irish in Youngstown and the Greater Mahoning Valley, Arcadia, 2004. ISBN 0-7385-3218-5
- Artisan Workers in the Upper South : Petersburg, Virginia, 1820-1865, Louisiana State University Press, 2008. ISBN 978-0-8071-3313-2
- The Old South’s Modern Worlds : Slavery, Region, and Nation in the Age of Progress, with Brian Schoen and Frank Towers. Oxford University Press, 2011. ISBN 978-0-19-538401-7
- Frederick Douglass : Reformer and Statesman, Routledge/Taylor & Francis Group, 2013. ISBN 978-0-415-89111-0
- Frederick Douglass : a Life in Documents, University of Virginia Press, 2013. ISBN 978-0-8139-3435-8
