= Joseph Barnes =

Joseph Barnes may refer to:

- Joseph Barnes (American physician) (1817–1883), Surgeon General of the United States Army
- Joseph Barnes (Irish doctor) (1914–2017), Irish physician and medical missionary
- Joseph Fels Barnes (1907–1970), American journalist
- Joseph Barnes (footballer) (1896–1953), English footballer
- Joseph Barnes (merchant) (died 1829), merchant and slave-owner in Jamaica
- Joe Barnes (born 1951), American player of Canadian football

== See also ==
- Joey Barnes (disambiguation)
