= Alfred Barnes =

Alfred Barnes may refer to:

- Alfred Barnes (Labour politician) (1887–1974), British Labour Party MP and government minister
- Alfred Barnes (Derbyshire politician) (1823–1901), British Liberal and later Liberal Unionist politician, MP 1880–1892
- Alfred Smith Barnes (1817–1888), American publisher
- Alfred E. Barnes (1892–1960), architect from Kansas City, Missouri
