= Jeremy Barnes (cricketer) =

English cricketer (born 1970)

Personal information
- Full name: Jeremy Paul Blissard Barnes
- Born: 23 March 1970 (age 56); Orpington, London, England
- Nickname: Jez
- Batting: Right-handed
- Role: Wicket-keeper

Domestic team information
- Years: Team
- 1998–1999: Oxford University

Career statistics
Competition	First-class
Matches	11
Runs scored	248
Batting average	20.66
100s/50s	0/0
Top score	45
Catches/stumpings	14/0
- Source: Cricinfo, 23 March 2021

Reverend Jeremy Paul Blissard "Jez" Barnes (born 23 March 1970) is an English clergyman and former first-class cricketer. Barnes was a right-handed batsman who played as a wicket-keeper.

Barnes was born at Orpington, Kent, in March 1970, before growing up in Herefordshire and Dorset. He was educated at Canford School, before reading economics and politics at the University of Southampton.

He later worked in management consultancy, prior to studying theology at Wycliffe Hall, Oxford.

Whilst at Oxford, he made his first-class debut for Oxford University against Worcestershire at Oxford in 1998. He played first-class cricket for Oxford until 1999, making a total of eleven first-class appearances. In his eleven first-class matches, he scored 248 runs at an average of 20.66, with a high score of 45. Behind the stumps he took 14 catches.

After graduating from Oxford, he was ordained as a Church of England clergyman. He initially served as the assistant curate of Holy Trinity Brompton until 2006, after which he became the assistant vicar at St Paul's Church, Shadwell. In 2009, he was appointed as the vicar of St Stephen's, Twickenham.
