= Crispin Barnes =

British academic

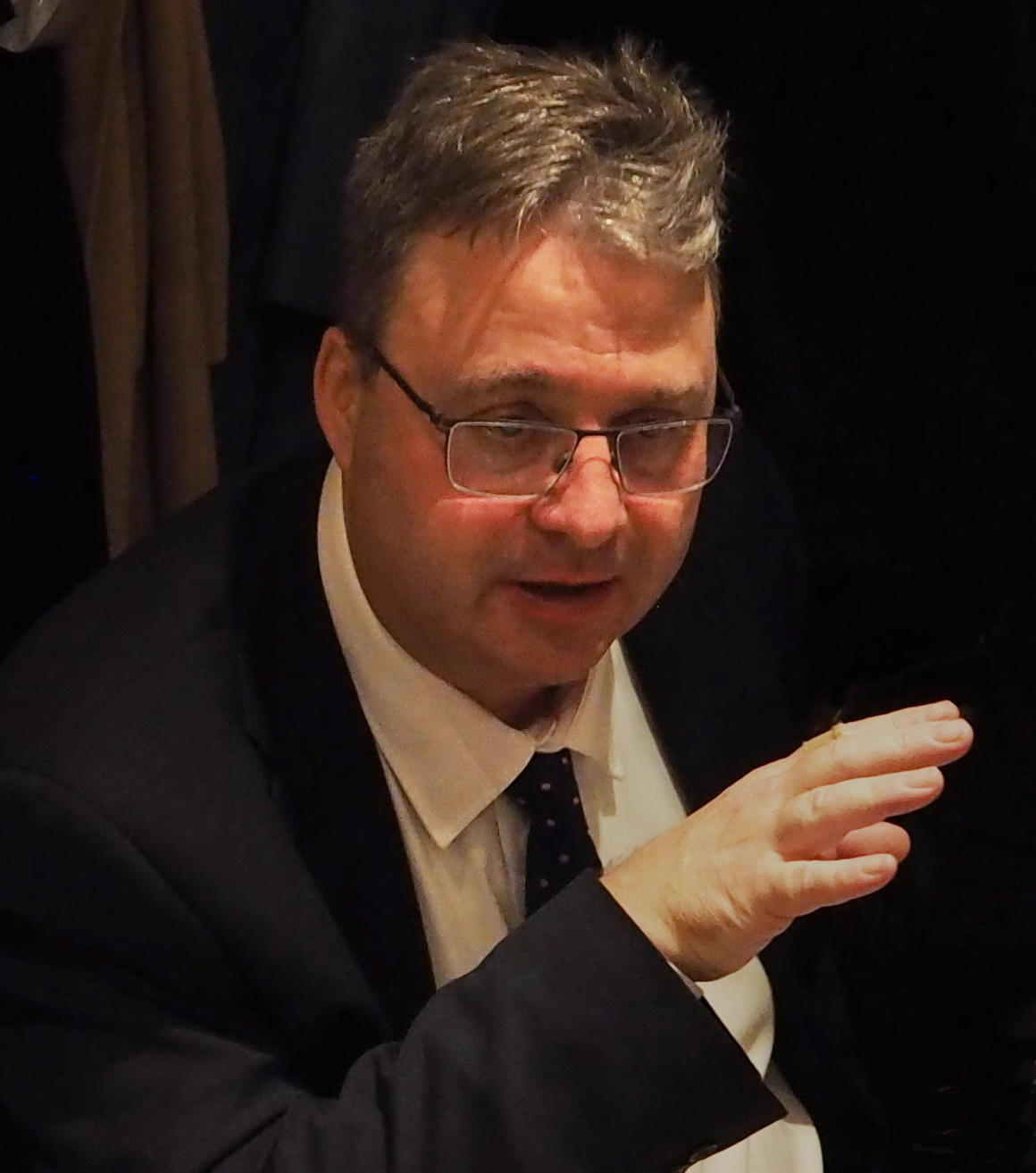
- Barnes in 2018
- Born: 5 February 1966 (age 60); Kent, United Kingdom
- Education: Imperial College London
- Scientific career
- Fields: Physicist
- Workplaces: University of Cambridge; RIKEN; Simon Fraser University
- Thesis: Reflection of Waves from Disordered Media (1990)
- Doctoral advisor: John Pendry
- Website: www.phy.cam.ac.uk/directory/barnesc

Crispin Henry William Barnes (born 5 February 1966, Kent, UK) is a British professor of quantum physics at the University of Cambridge. He is the head of the Thin Film Magnetism and Quantum Information groups at the Cavendish Laboratory, University of Cambridge. He lectures on advanced quantum condensed matter physics and quantum information. Crispin Barnes is the brother of British bird artist and adventurer Eustace Barnes.

== Education ==
Barnes was educated at Imperial College London, where he graduated with first-class honours in 1987. He received his Ph.D. in theoretical condensed matter physics from Imperial College London in 1991. His Ph.D. thesis established a new way of calculating wave reflections in disordered media.

== Career ==
Barnes is known for his research on theoretical condensed matter physics, electron-based quantum computing, and the foundations of quantum mechanics. In 2000 he published a protocol for universal quantum computing with electron-spin qubits controlled by surface acoustic waves.

In 1992, Barnes was awarded a Royal Society Fellowship, which he spent at Simon Fraser University. Between 1993 and 1994 he was a research scientist at RIKEN, Japan. Barnes has been affiliated with the University of Cambridge since 1994. He became the head of the Thin Film Magnetism group of the Cavendish Laboratory in 2008, and he received a professorial fellowship at Girton College in 2014.
