= Eric Barnes (rugby league) =

Australian rugby league footballer (1940–2019)

Personal information
- Full name: Eric Barnes
- Born: 17 October 1940; Sydney, New South Wales, Australia
- Died: 27 June 2019 (aged 78); Coffs Harbour, New South Wales

Playing information
- Position: Lock, Prop, Hooker
Club
Years	Team	Pld	T	G	FG	P
1962–66	North Sydney	50	4	0	0	12
1967	Cronulla-Sutherland	22	1	0	0	3
	Total	72	5	0	0	15

Eric Barnes (17 October 1940 − 27 June 2019) was an Australian rugby league footballer who played in the 1960s. He played for North Sydney and Cronulla-Sutherland as a lock but also played at prop and hooker. He was an inaugural player for Cronulla and played in the club's first ever game.

== Playing career ==
Barnes began his first grade career for North Sydney in 1962. In 1965, Barnes played in both finals games for North Sydney which were a 47–7 defeat against St. George and a 14–9 defeat against Souths in the preliminary final.

In 1967, Barnes joined newly admitted side Cronulla-Sutherland and played in the club's first ever game, an 11–5 victory over Eastern Suburbs at the Sydney Sports Ground. Barnes went on to play 22 times for Cronulla as the club finished last on the table and claimed the wooden spoon.

== Death ==
Barnes died at Coffs Harbour on 27 June 2019.
