= Sam Barnes (footballer, born 1991) =

English footballer (born 1991)

Personal information
- Date of birth: 16 October 1991 (age 35)
- Place of birth: Liverpool, England
- Position: Centre-back

Team information
- Current team: Aberystwyth Town
- Number: 26

Youth career
- Stockport County

Senior career*
Years	Team	Apps	(Gls)
2009–2011	Stockport County	2	(0)
2011	Northwich Victoria	1	(0)
2011–2012	Marine	43	(?)
2012–2013	Hednesford Town	0	(0)
2013–2014	Marine	30	(1)
2015–2016	Glossop North End	33	(1)
2016–2019	Colwyn Bay		
2019	Bangor City		
2019–2020	Newtown		
2020	Widnes		
2020	Aberystwyth Town	2	(0)
2021	Prestatyn Town	0	(0)
2021–	Aberystwyth Town	0	(0)
- * Club domestic league appearances and goals as of 15 September 2020

Sam Barnes (born 16 October 1991) is an English footballer who plays as a centre-back for Cymru Premier club Aberystwyth Town.

A former Liverpool schoolboys player, he first played for the Stockport County Under 18 team whilst still at school. His twin brother Louis Barnes was also part of the Under 18 side and was, along with Sam, given a squad number for the first team in the 2009/10 season.

In August 2010 both of the Barnes twins went on trial at Manchester United and played for United's reserve team in a pre-season 2–0 win over Altrincham.

They were released shortly afterwards after they failed to agree new contracts at Stockport County. In January 2011 he joined Northwich Victoria.

In February 2011 he joined Marine. After 43 appearances for the club, in June 2012 he went on to join division rivals Hednesford Town.

On 20 June 2020, Barnes joined Aberystwyth Town.

== Career statistics ==
As of match played 24 April 2010

Appearances and goals by club, season and competition
Club	Season	League			FA Cup		League Cup		Other		Total	
Club	Season	Division	Apps	Goals	Apps	Goals	Apps	Goals	Apps	Goals	Apps	Goals
Stockport County	2009–10	Football League One	2	0	0	0	0	0	0	0	2	0
Career total			2	0	0	0	0	0	0	0	2	0
