= John Barnes (Scottish broadcaster) =

Sports commentator for BBC Scotland

John Barnes (born Irvine; c. 1960) is a sports commentator working for BBC Scotland. He is one of the most respected sports broadcasters in Scotland and has worked on both television and radio, mainly as a football commentator on the flagship programmes Sportscene and Sportsound.

He joined the BBC in 1993 after previously having worked in broadcasting for Radio Clyde, STV, West Sound Radio and BT Supercall Sport.

Barnes was a writer for the Scottish Daily Express before joining the BBC.

He commentated for the BBC at the 1998 World Cup Finals in France.

He was the last Scot to provide radio commentary on a Scottish club in a European final – Uefa Cup Final 2008: Zenit St Petersburg v Glasgow Rangers.

Barnes was famously assaulted during a television interview, by the chairman of Dundee United, Jim McLean, at Tannadice following a match with Hearts in October 2000. McLean resigned following the incident before the football authorities could deal with him.

Former players Gordon Smith, Willie Miller, Billy Dodds, Kevin McGowne and Craig Paterson regularly join Barnes as co-commentator.

Barnes has a close association with Kilmarnock Football Club having played with the Ayrshire club's youth team. He also played for the successful Ayrshire Junior football club Auchinleck Talbot.

On 31 March 2014 the Evening Times ranked Barnes as the ninth greatest Scottish football commentator.
