= Harry Barnes =

Harry Barnes may refer to:

- Sir Harry Barnes (artist) (1915–1982), Scottish artist
- Harry Barnes (baseball) (1915–1993), American Negro league baseball player
- Harry Barnes (basketball) (born 1945), American basketball player
- Harry Barnes (footballer) (1903–2001), Australian rules footballer
- Harry Barnes (Labour politician) (1936–2026), British Labour Party MP for North East Derbyshire, 1987–2005
- Harry Barnes (Liberal politician) (1870–1935), British Liberal Party MP for Newcastle upon Tyne East, 1918–1922
- Harry Elmer Barnes (1889–1968), American historian
- Harry Paul Barnes (1935–2016), Canadian gangster
- Harry F. Barnes (1932–2019), U.S. federal judge
- Harry G. Barnes Jr. (1926–2012), American diplomat, United States ambassador to India

== See also ==
- Harrison Barnes (born 1992), American basketball player
- Henry Barnes (disambiguation)
