= Robert Barnes =

Robert Barnes may refer to:

== Sportspeople ==
- Robert Barnes (sportsman) (1911–1987), Irish cricketer and rugby union player
- Robert Barnes (Australian footballer) (1896–1967), Australian rules footballer
- Robert Barnes (footballer, born 1969), English footballer, played for Wrexham and Northwich Victoria
- Bob Barnes (baseball) (1902–1993), Major League Baseball pitcher
- Bobby Barnes (born 1962), English footballer, played for West Ham, Northampton Town, Peterborough and many others

== Other people ==
- Robert Barnes (attorney) (born 1974), American attorney
- Robert Barnes (martyr) (1495–1540), English reformer
- Robert Barnes (physician) (1817–1907), English obstetrician
- Robert A. Barnes (1808–1892), businessman in St. Louis
- Robert Henry Barnes (1849–1916), British–New Zealand chess player
- Robert L. Barnes (born 1951), Canadian judge
- Robert Percy Barnes (1898–1990), American chemist
- Bob Barnes (cartoonist) (1913–1970), cartoonist
- Bootsie Barnes (Robert Barnes, 1937–2020), jazz musician

== Characters ==
- Staff Sgt. Bob Barnes, a character in Platoon
- Bob Barnes, George Clooney's character in the 2005 film Syriana
- Bobby Barnes, one of the two characters known as Wonder Boy from DC Comics

== Other uses ==
- USS Robert L. Barnes, an oiler in the United States Navy

== See also ==
- Bert Barnes (disambiguation)
