= Bert Barnes (footballer) =

Australian rules footballer

Personal information
- Full name: William Robert Barnes
- Born: 22 May 1890; Richmond, Victoria
- Died: 27 January 1964 (aged 73); South Yarra, Victoria
- Original team: Richmond Districts

Playing career^{1}
Years	Club	Games (Goals)
1915–1916	Richmond	3 (4)
- ^{1} Playing statistics correct to the end of 1916.

William Robert Barnes (22 May 1890 – 27 January 1964) was an Australian rules footballer who played for the Richmond Football Club in the Victorian Football League (VFL).
