= Andy Barnes =

English footballer

Personal information
- Full name: Andrew John Barnes
- Date of birth: 31 March 1967 (age 59)
- Place of birth: Croydon, England
- Position: Forward

Senior career*
Years	Team	Apps	(Gls)
1990–1991	Sutton United	48	(30)
1991–1994	Crystal Palace	1	(0)
1993–1994	→ Carlisle United (loan)	2	(0)
- * Club domestic league appearances and goals

Andrew John Barnes (born 31 March 1967) is a retired footballer who played for Sutton United, Crystal Palace and Carlisle United.
