= F. C. Barnes =

American gospel musician and pastor

- Also known as: Rev. F. C. Barnes; Rev. Faircloth Barnes
- Born: Fair Cloth Barnes; June 22, 1929; Rocky Mount, North Carolina
- Died: July 11, 2011 (aged 82) Greenville, North Carolina
- Genres: CCM, gospel, traditional black gospel, urban contemporary gospel
- Occupations: Christian pastor, singer, songwriter
- Instrument: Voice
- Years active: 1984–2005
- Label: Atlanta International (AIR Gospel)

Reverend Fair Cloth "F. C." Barnes (June 22, 1929 – July 11, 2011) was an American gospel musician, and the founding pastor of Red Budd Holy Church, Rocky Mount, North Carolina. His recorded music career began in 1983, with the album Rough Side of the Mountain, released by Atlanta International Records (AIR Gospel); all his fifteen albums were on that label. That album reached no. 1 in the Billboard magazine Gospel Albums chart, and six others entered the top twenty.

== Early life ==
Barnes was born on June 22, 1929, in Rocky Mount, North Carolina, as Fair Cloth Barnes. He was reared in the church at Marks Chapel Baptist Church, where he sang in the choir. He became a minister in 1955. He studied at United Christian College, Goldsboro, North Carolina, where in 1959 he earned his doctoral degree. He thereafter founded and preached at Red Budd Holy Church, and traveled with Rev. Janice Brown around North Carolina singing at churches.

== Musical career ==
He began his recording music career in 1983 with the album Rough Side of the Mountain, with Rev. Janice Brown, on Atlanta International Records (AIR Gospel). That album would go on to chart on the Billboard magazine Gospel Albums chart at No. 1. It stayed in the top ten for over a year; it sold more than a half million copies, and was therefore certified Gold by the RIAA. He released fourteen more albums on the same label. Six of them reached the top twenty, but only that album captured the top spot.

== Personal life ==
Barnes and his wife Addrine Gaskins Barnes married in Greenville, North Carolina; that union lasted until his death. They had four sons, Samuel, Luther, Melvin, and Tony, and two daughters, Demita and Valencia, and one other daughter who predeceased him.

== Discography ==
List of selected studio albums, with selected chart positions
Title	Album details	Peak chart positions
Title	Album details	US Gos
Rough Side of the Mountain	Released: 1984; Label: Atlanta International; CD, digital download	1
No Tears In Glory	Released: 1984; Label: Atlanta International; CD, digital download	4
Hold On	Released: 1985; Label: Atlanta International; CD, digital download	8
I Hear Jesus Calling	Released: 1987; Label: Atlanta International; CD, digital download	16
Can't You See...	Released: 1990; Label: Atlanta International; CD, digital download	7
God Delivered	Released: 1991; Label: Atlanta International; CD, digital download	30
I Can't Make It (Without the Lord)	Released: 1993; Label: Atlanta International; CD, digital download	20
