= Ruth Barnes =

British art historian and museum curator

Ruth Barnes (born 1947) is an art historian in the field of South and Southeast Asian textiles. She served as textile curator of the Ashmolean Museum in Oxford before taking up her current position as Curator of Indo-Pacific Art at Yale University. She is a fellow of the Royal Asiatic Society.

== Biography ==
Ruth Barnes received her degree from the University of Edinburgh, and her doctorate from the University of Oxford. She worked as a research assistant alongside Hélène la Rue, Curator of Musical Instruments at the Pitt Rivers Museum, before moving on as a collections researcher to the Ashmolean and the Museum der Weltkulturen in Frankfurt. She has been at the forefront of numerous galleries and exhibitions on Asian and Islamic textiles, early Indian Ocean trade, and pilgrimage during her time at the Ashmolean Museum. At Yale, Dr Barnes will head the newly created Department of Indo-Pacific Art at the University Art Gallery.

In addition to her curatorial background, Barnes has also lectured in the faculties of Oriental Studies and Anthropology at the University of Oxford and SOAS in London. She is also an accomplished academic, having published and edited numerous books and journal articles on textiles and Asian dress as well as acting on the editorial board of several textile publication journals. Her research interests focus on the social history of material culture, with a focus on Indian Ocean trade during the pre-European and early European periods.

== Bibliography ==
Select bibliography

- 2010 (Barnes, Ruth and Mary H. Kahlenberg, eds.) Five Centuries of Indonesian Textiles. The Mary Hunt Kahlenberg Collection. Munich, New York: Prestel.
- 2009 (Kerlogue, Fiona and Barnes, Ruth, eds.) Southeast Asian collections in European museums. Indonesia and the Malay World Vol. 37: No. 108.
- 2006 (Barnes, Ruth and Crispin Branfoot) Pilgrimage. The Sacred Journey. Oxford: Ashmolean Museum.
- 2005 (Barnes, Ruth, ed.) Textiles in Indian Ocean Societies. London: RoutledgeCurzon.
- 2002 (Parkin, David and Ruth Barnes, eds.) Ships and the Development of Maritime Technology in the Indian Ocean. London: RoutledgeCurzon.
- 1992 (Barnes, Ruth and Joanne Eicher, eds.) Dress and Gender: Making and Meaning in Cultural Contexts. New York and Oxford: Berg.
