= Vet Barnes =

- Pitcher
- Batted: Unknown Threw: Unknown

Negro league baseball debut
- 1937, for the Kansas City Monarchs

Last appearance
- 1938, for the Kansas City Monarchs
- Stats at Baseball Reference

Teams
- Kansas City Monarchs (1938)

Ed "Vet" Barnes, also listed as Sam Barnes, (December 23, 1911 – May 13, 1974) was an American professional baseball pitcher in the Negro leagues. He played with the Kansas City Monarchs in 1937 and 1938.

Barnes was born on December 23, 1911, in Silver Creek, Mississippi. He died on May 13, 1974, in Vallejo, California at the age of 62.
