= Johnny Barnes =

Bermudian entertainer (1923–2016)

Coordinates: 32°17′34.9″N 64°46′11.3″W

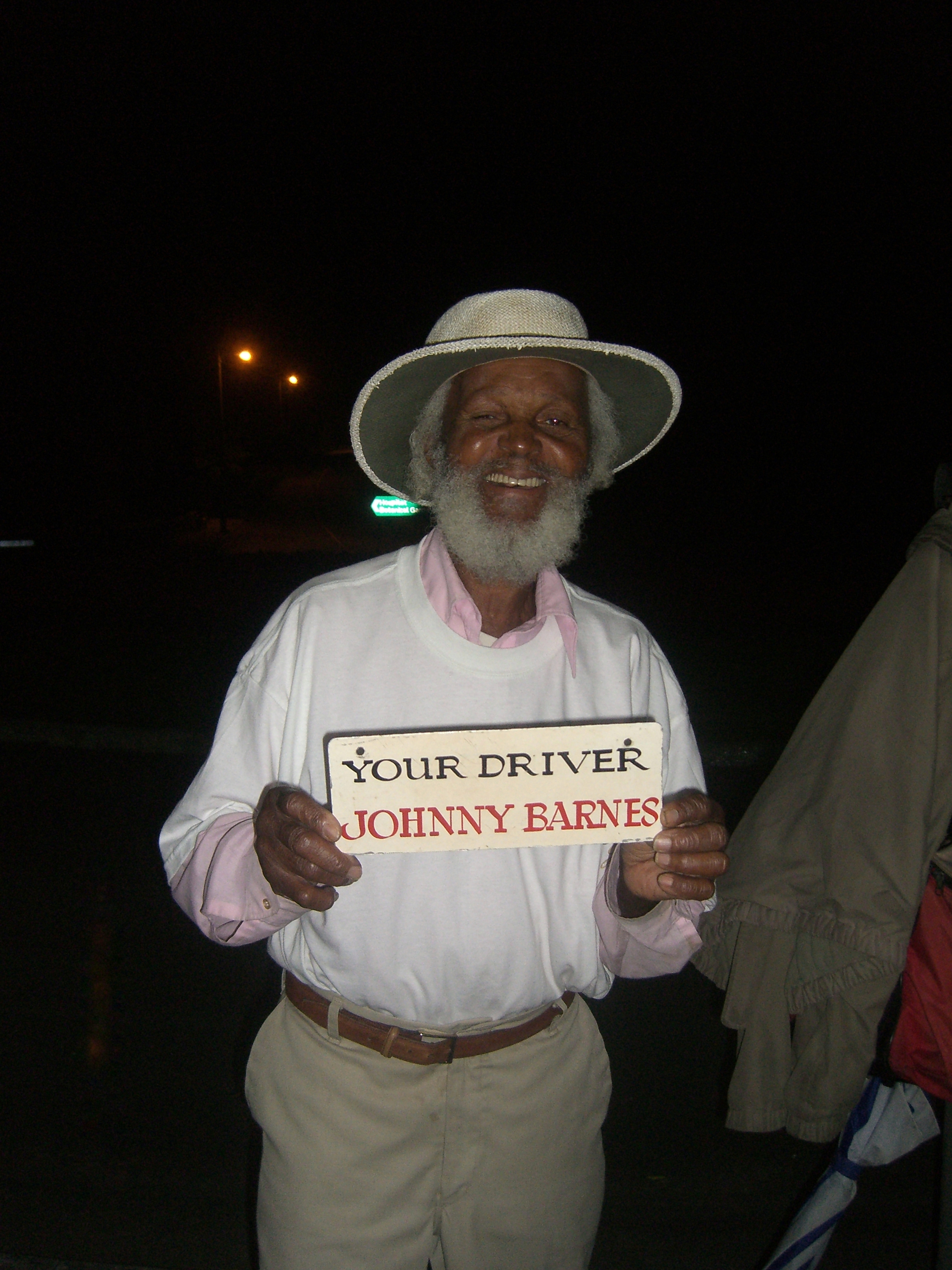
- Barnes in 2007
- Born: John James Randolf Adolphus Mills; June 23, 1923
- Died: July 9, 2016 (aged 92); Paget Parish, Bermuda

John James Randolf Adolphus Mills (June 23, 1923 – July 9, 2016), known as Johnny Barnes, was a Bermudian entertainer who waved to passing traffic at the Foot of the Lane roundabout in Hamilton, Bermuda, from roughly 3:45 am to 10 am, every workday.

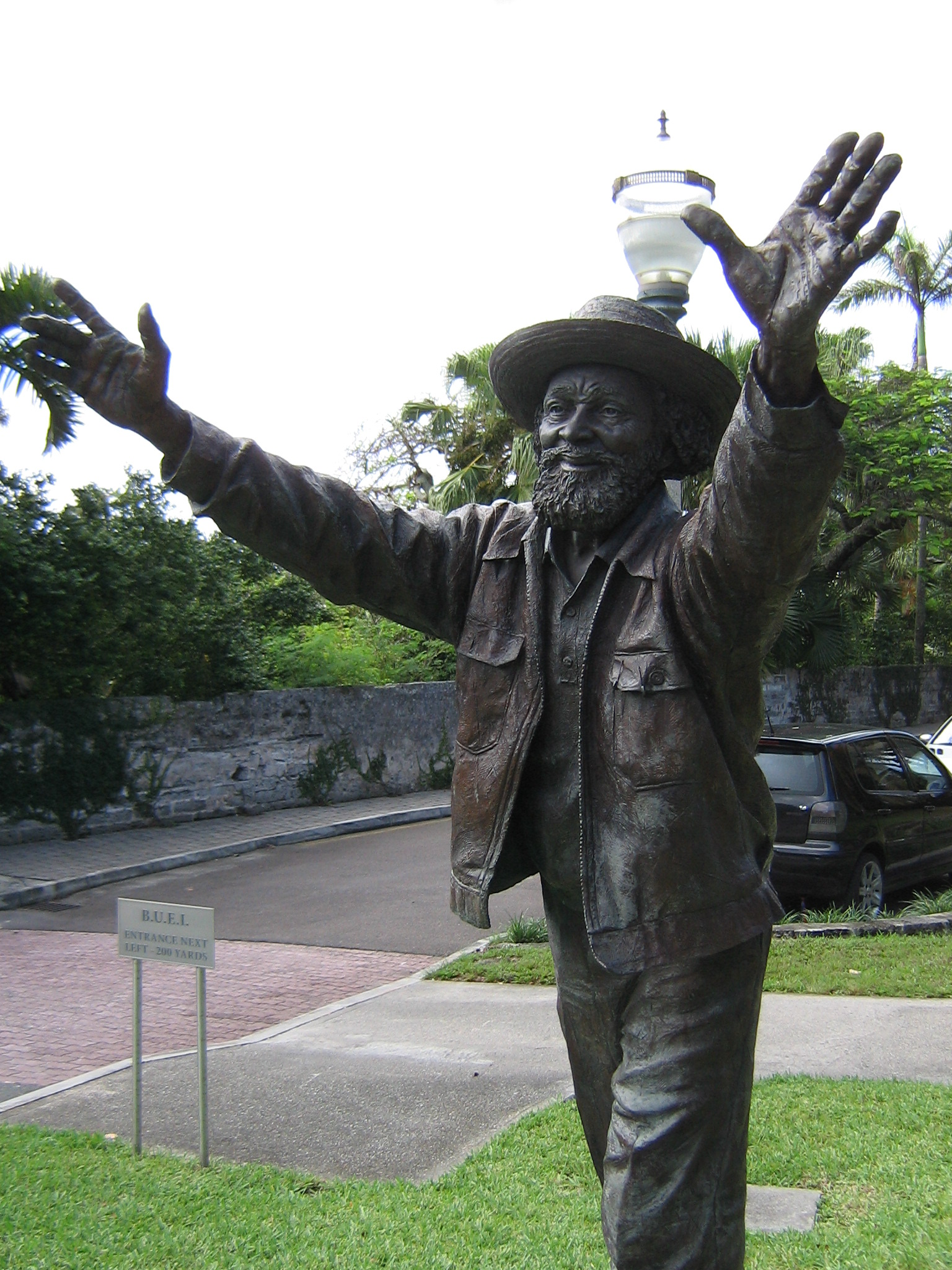
Statue of Johnny Barnes, located near the Bermuda Underwater Exploration Institute

A Bermuda institution mentioned in several guidebooks and profiled in two documentary films, he was known for waving and saying "I love you, God loves you", to passing commuters during the morning rush hour into Hamilton. Due to the unique layout of the island and its roads, nearly all drivers at rush hour coming from the western and southern areas of the island passed Barnes at the roundabout.

== Life ==
Barnes, born to parents from St. Kitts, was an electrician by trade and worked on the Bermuda Railroad as an electrician until the railroad closed in 1948. He then became a bus driver. Barnes was fond of waving to people while driving the bus, and would occasionally sit and wave to people on his breaks or when coming to work.

Barnes was married in 1949 and lived with his wife until his death on July 9, 2016. His wife had a cheery disposition because he had "covered her with honey" since they were married. They had no children.

In approximately 1986, Barnes stopped at the Crow Lane roundabout and took up waving to traffic. He was there almost every day, until his "retirement" in December 2015. Local radio stations report receiving frantic calls when Barnes was not at his unofficial post. He was occasionally joined by people, sometimes costumed, waving signs to promote a charity, event, or business.

== Attitudes and beliefs ==
Barnes credits his mother for teaching him goodwill and kindness to strangers, including 'speaking to everyone you see, because you never know when you might need them', and punishing him for not talking to a lady he saw.

Barnes has said, "I enjoy making people happy, ... I like to let them know that life is sweet, that it's good to be alive". In the 2011 documentary Mr Happy Man, he says "Life is sweet, life is beautiful, it is sweet to be alive. Enjoy the sunshine, the flowers, the birds – they're happy".

In the 2011 short-subject documentary Mr. Happy Man, Barnes identified himself as a religious man, a Seventh-Day Adventist who was motivated to share God's love for everyone. Though Barnes would pray with visitors to his post if requested, he was not known as a religious proselytizer. Barnes said "We human beings got to learn how to love one another ... Then there wouldn't be any wars, there wouldn't be any killing", and '"People need to know that love is important".

== Legacy ==
In November 1998, a group of local businessmen unveiled a life-size bronze statue of Barnes blowing kisses in the air. The statue is located on Crow Lane just up from the roundabout. Although there were objections to spending $70,000 to build a statue to a man still living, Barnes said in Mr. Happy Man that he appreciated the gesture while he was still alive, saying he would not be able to enjoy it if he were dead.

In early June 2016, Dennis Bean temporarily took up Johnny's position at the roundabout at the bottom of Trimingham Road, waving to traffic in the same manner made famous by Johnny Barnes.
