= Julius Steele Barnes =

American physician

Julius Steele Barnes (February 23, 1792 – November 12, 1870) was an American medical doctor based in Southington, Connecticut. He served one term as Connecticut State Senator, and held for a time the office of probate judge.

== Biography ==
Barnes was born in Tolland, Connecticut, the son of Jonathan Barnes and Rachel Steele, of West Hartford, Connecticut, adopted daughter of her maternal uncle, Reverend George Colton, of Bolton, Connecticut, under whose instruction Dr. Barnes was fitted for college. He graduated from Yale College in 1815 and Yale Medical School in 1818, and shortly after commenced practice in Southington, Connecticut. He also served a term in the Connecticut State Senate, and was a probate judge.

He married Laura Lewis, of Southington, who died two years before him; he died in 1870, at the age of 78. Of their nine children, seven survived them, including Lewis Barnes, another physician, and Mary Barnes Day, matron of the Golden Hill Institute.
