= Deaths in January 2011 =

The following is a list of notable deaths in January 2011.

Entries for each day are listed alphabetically by surname. A typical entry lists information in the following sequence:

- Name, age, country of citizenship at birth, subsequent country of citizenship (if applicable), reason for notability, cause of death (if known), and reference.

== January 2011 ==
=== 1 ===
- Anna Anni, 84, Italian costume designer (Otello, Tea with Mussolini, Callas Forever).
- Georgiy Ball, 83, Russian writer.
- Branko Bokun, 90, Yugoslavian writer.
- Peter Branson, 86, British admiral.
- Sir Robin Carnegie, 84, British army general.
- Charles Fambrough, 60, American jazz musician and composer.
- Bruce Halliday, 84, Canadian physician and politician, MP for Oxford (1974–1993).
- Gerd Michael Henneberg, 88, German actor.
- Sonia Humphrey, 63, Australian television presenter and journalist.
- Flemming Jørgensen, 63, Danish actor and musician (Bamses Venner), heart attack.
- Verne Langdon, 69, American musician, record producer and make-up artist.
- Constantin Marin, 85, Romanian musician, conductor and composer.
- John Olguin, 89, American aquarium official, director of the Cabrillo Marine Aquarium (1949–1987).
- Billy Joe Patton, 88, American golfer.
- Louise Reiss, 90, American physician, co-ordinator of the Baby Tooth Survey.
- John Rice, 92, American baseball umpire (1955–1973).
- Faizal Yusof, 32, Malaysian actor, heart attack.

=== 2 ===
- Bali Ram Bhagat, 88, Indian politician, Speaker of the Lok Sabha (1976–1977) and Governor of Rajasthan (1993–1998).
- Mia Bustam, 90, Indonesian painter, writer, and political prisoner
- Kate Ebli, 52, American politician, member of the Michigan House of Representatives (2006–2010).
- Anne Francis, 80, American actress (Honey West, Forbidden Planet, The Twilight Zone), pancreatic cancer.
- Peter Hobbs, 92, French-born American actor (Barney Miller, Lou Grant, The Odd Couple).
- Hans Kalt, 86, Swiss rower, Olympic silver (1948) and bronze (1952) medalist.
- Émile Masson Jr., 95, Belgian cyclist, winner of Paris–Roubaix and La Flèche Wallonne classic cycle races.
- John Osborne, 74, Montserratian politician, Chief Minister (1978–1991; 2001–2006), after long illness.
- Pete Postlethwaite, 64, British actor (In the Name of the Father, Amistad, The Usual Suspects), pancreatic cancer.
- William R. Ratchford, 76, American politician, U.S. Representative from Connecticut (1979–1985), complications from Parkinson's disease.
- Bill Robertson, 93, Australian intelligence officer.
- Miriam Seegar, 103, American silent film actress and interior designer.
- Shen Tianhui, 87, Chinese chemist, academician of Chinese Academy of Sciences.
- Patricia Smith, 80, American actress (The Spirit of St. Louis, The Bob Newhart Show, The Debbie Reynolds Show), heart failure.
- Margot Stevenson, 98, American stage and radio actress (The Shadow).
- Szeto Wah, 79, Hong Kong political activist, lung cancer.
- Robert Trumble, 91, Australian writer and musician.
- Hari Uppal, 84, Indian dancer and dance academy founder.
- Richard Winters, 92, American army officer and World War II veteran, depicted in Band of Brothers, Parkinson's disease.

=== 3 ===
- Julia Bonds, 58, American activist, cancer.
- Fadil Hadžić, 88, Croatian filmmaker, screenwriter, playwright and journalist.
- Jill Haworth, 65, English actress (Exodus, In Harm's Way, Cabaret, The Outer Limits), natural causes.
- Zbigniew Jaremski, 61, Polish athlete, 1976 Olympic silver medalist.
- Michael Kennelly, 96, Irish-born American Jesuit priest, President of Loyola University New Orleans (1970–1974), founder of Strake Jesuit College Prep.
- Suchitra Mitra, 86, Indian singer, cardiac arrest.
- Alfred Proksch, 102, Austrian athlete and graphic designer.
- Yosef Shiloach, 69, Israeli actor, cancer.
- Anatoliy Skorokhod, 81, Ukrainian mathematician.
- Paul Soldner, 89, American ceramicist.
- Eva Strittmatter, 80, German writer.
- William Takaku, Papua New Guinean film and theatre actor, screenwriter and theatre director.
- Stanley Tolliver, 85, American attorney and civil rights advocate.
- Nakamura Tomijūrō V, 81, Japanese Kabuki actor, Living National Treasure.
- Alec Woodall, 92, British politician, MP for Hemsworth (1974–1987).

=== 4 ===
- Mohamed Bouazizi, 26, Tunisian protestor, self-immolation.
- Albert E. Bradbury, 93, American politician.
- Grady Chapman, 81, American doo-wop singer (The Robins), heart failure.
- Chrysanth Chepil, 73, Russian Orthodox prelate, Metropolitan of Vyatka-Slobodskoy.
- B. H. Friedman, 84, American author and art critic, pneumonia.
- Keki Byramjee Grant, 90, Indian cardiologist.
- Sir John Gray, 92, British physiologist.
- Cyril M. Harris, 93, American acoustical engineer.
- Hadayatullah Hübsch, 64, German journalist.
- Mick Karn, 52, Cypriot-born British musician (Japan), cancer.
- Dick King-Smith, 88, British author (The Sheep-Pig, The Water Horse, The Queen's Nose).
- Gustavo Kupinski, 36, Argentine guitarist (Los Piojos), traffic collision.
- Herb Mitchell, 73, American actor (The Practice, Gettysburg, Austin Powers: The Spy Who Shagged Me).
- Coen Moulijn, 73, Dutch footballer, brain haemorrhage.
- Ali-Reza Pahlavi, 44, Iranian royal, son of Shah Mohammed Reza Pahlavi, suicide by gunshot.
- Ronald Parfitt, 97, British Olympic fencer.
- Gerry Rafferty, 63, Scottish singer-songwriter ("Baker Street", "Stuck in the Middle with You", "Right Down the Line"), liver failure.
- Jack Richardson, 90, British chemical engineer.
- Salmaan Taseer, 66, Pakistani politician, Governor of Punjab (since 2008), shot.
- Bob Usdane, 74, American politician, member of the Arizona Senate (1977–1991), after a short illness.

=== 5 ===
- Ross Cain, 54, Nauruan politician.
- Jim Duncan, 86, American football player (New York Giants) and coach (Saskatchewan Roughriders, Calgary Stampeders).
- Paul Egertson, 75, American Lutheran bishop, heart attack.
- David Hart, 66, British political activist, author and playwright, motor neurone disease.
- Lily Marinho, 89, Brazilian philanthropist, UNESCO Goodwill Ambassador, respiratory failure.
- Malangatana Ngwenya, 74, Mozambican poet and painter, after long illness.
- Jack Oliver, 87, American scientist, provided seismic evidence supporting plate tectonics.
- Helene Palmer, 82, British actress (Coronation Street).
- Agustin Perdices, 76, Filipino politician, Governor of Negros Oriental (since 2010), stomach cancer.
- Assar Rönnlund, 75, Swedish cross-country skier, world and Olympic champion.
- Brian Rust, 88, British jazz discographer and music journalist.
- David G. Trager, 73, American jurist, pancreatic cancer.
- Bill Zeller, 27, American computer programmer, complications from a suicide attempt.

=== 6 ===
- Leovigildo Banaag, 67, Filipino politician, cardiac arrest.
- Rudi Bass, 96, Austrian-born American graphic artist, illustrator and writer.
- John Bendor-Samuel, 81, British missionary and linguist, traffic collision.
- Tom Cavanagh, 28, American ice hockey player (San Jose Sharks), blunt force trauma.
- Susana Chávez, 36, Mexican poet and human rights activist, strangled.
- Francisco de la Rosa, 44, Dominican baseball player (Baltimore Orioles), after a long illness.
- Ryne Duren, 81, American baseball player (Philadelphia Phillies, New York Yankees).
- Ohan Durian, 88, Armenian composer.
- Gad Granach, 95, German memoirist, son of Alexander Granach.
- John D. Kendall, 93, American musical educator (Suzuki method), complications of a stroke.
- Irving Farmer Kennedy, 88, Canadian World War II fighter pilot.
- Aron Kincaid, 70, American actor (The Ghost in the Invisible Bikini, Batman: the Animated Series, The Transformers), heart failure.
- Gary Mason, 48, British boxer, cycling collision.
- Uche Okafor, 43, Nigerian footballer, murdered.
- Andrzej Przeździecki, 84, Polish Olympic fencer and trainer.
- Anthony S. Seminerio, 75, American politician and convicted felon, member of the New York State Assembly (1979–2009).
- Pyotr Sumin, 64, Russian politician, Governor of Chelyabinsk Oblast (1996–2010).
- Donald J. Tyson, 80, American business executive, Chairman of Tyson Foods (1967–2001), cancer.
- Vang Pao, 81, Lao army general and Hmong community leader, Commander of the Secret Army, pneumonia.
- Reg Ward, 82, British chief executive of London Docklands Development Corporation (1981–1987).
- Dagmar Wilson, 94, American anti-nuclear activist, heart failure.

=== 7 ===
- Helga Bachmann, 79, Icelandic actress and director.
- Red Borom, 95, American baseball player (Detroit Tigers).
- Eddie Carr, 87, American football player (San Francisco 49ers).
- Carlos Castro, 65, Portuguese journalist, bludgeoned.
- Derek Gardner, 79, British vehicle and Formula One car designer.
- Robert P. Hanrahan, 76, American politician, U.S. Representative from Illinois (1973–1975).
- George Harris, 77, American Olympic judoka, leukemia.
- Bill "Tiger" Johnson, 84, American football player (San Francisco 49ers) and coach (Cincinnati Bengals).
- Krzysztof Kolberger, 60, Polish actor, cancer.
- Włodzimierz Ławniczak, 51, Polish journalist, Chairman of Telewizja Polska, after long illness.
- Val Puccio, 45, American professional wrestler.
- Alberte Pullman, 90, French theoretical and quantum chemist.
- Richard Bordeaux Parker, 87, American diplomat.
- Bobby Robinson, 93, American record producer.
- Simona Senoner, 17, Italian ski jumper.
- José Vidal, 70, Dominican baseball player (Cleveland Indians, Seattle Pilots), cancer.

=== 8 ===
- Noel Andrews, 79, Irish boxing commentator.
- Joey Carew, 73, Trinidadian cricketer (West Indies), arteriosclerosis.
- Willi Dansgaard, 88, Danish paleoclimatologist.
- Jiří Dienstbier, 73, Czech politician, Minister of Foreign Affairs (1989–1992).
- Peter Donaldson, 58, Canadian actor (The Sweet Hereafter, Emily of New Moon, Road to Avonlea), lung cancer.
- Hans Ulrich Engelmann, 89, German composer.
- Mike Gambrill, 75, British Olympic cyclist, bronze medalist (1956).
- José García, 84, Uruguayan footballer.
- Oleg Grabar, 81, American Islamic art historian, heart failure.
- Ángel Pedraza, 48, Spanish footballer and manager, cancer.
- Manuel Pestana Filho, 82, Brazilian Roman Catholic prelate, Bishop of Anápolis (1978–2004).
- Juan Piquer Simón, 74, Spanish film director (Pieces, Slugs), lung cancer.
- John Roll, 63, American jurist, shot.
- Del Reisman, 86, American television producer (The Twilight Zone, The Untouchables) and writer, President of WGAW (1991–1993), cardiac arrest.
- Elfa Secioria, 51, Indonesian jazz pianist.
- Thorbjørn Svenssen, 86, Norwegian footballer, record 104 appearances for the national team, stroke.
- Morton Sweig, 95, American businessman.
- Marcia Torres, 60–61, Chilean hairstylist and entertainer, first transgender woman that had a sex reassignment surgery in Latin America.
- Christopher Trumbo, 70, American screenwriter, kidney cancer.
- William F. Walsh, 98, American politician, Mayor of Syracuse, New York (1961–1969), Congressman (1973–1979).
- Moshe Yess, 67, Canadian composer and singer, cancer.

=== 9 ===
- James Acord, 66, American sculptor, suicide.
- Vítor Alves, 75, Portuguese soldier and politician, member of the MFA, responsible for the Carnation Revolution, cancer.
- Richard Butcher, 29, English footballer (Macclesfield Town), natural causes.
- Ruth Cavin, 92, American mystery novel editor, lung cancer.
- Debbie Friedman, 59, American songwriter, pneumonia.
- Sir Ernest Lee-Steere, 98, Australian horse racing official, Lord Mayor of Perth, Western Australia (1972–1978).
- Makinti Napanangka, 80s, Australian Papunya Tula artist.
- Howard Wallace Pollock, 90, American politician, U.S. Representative from Alaska (1967–1971).
- Dave Sisler, 79, American baseball player (Boston Red Sox, Cincinnati Reds), prostate cancer.
- Georges Vanbrabant, 84, Belgian Olympian
- Jerzy Woźniak, 78, Polish footballer (Legia Warszawa).
- Peter Yates, 81, British film director and producer (Bullitt, Breaking Away, Krull).

=== 10 ===
- Liana Alexandra, 63, Romanian music educator and composer.
- Naseerullah Babar, 82, Pakistani soldier and politician, Governor of Khyber Pakhtunkhwa (1976–1977) and Interior Minister (1993–1996).
- Arthur Barrett, 83, English footballer.
- Bill Bower, 93, American aviator, last surviving pilot of Doolittle Raid, complications from a fall.
- John Dye, 47, American actor (Touched by an Angel, Tour of Duty, Jack's Place), heart attack.
- Dorothy Franey, 97, American Olympic speed skater.
- Cookie Gilchrist, 75, American football player (Buffalo Bills, Denver Broncos), cancer.
- Joe Gores, 79, American novelist and screenwriter.
- John Gross, 75, British literary critic.
- Miklós Hofer, 79, Hungarian architect.
- Bert Kinnear, 87, British Olympic swimmer.
- Bora Kostić, 80, Serbian footballer (Red Star Belgrade).
- Shota Kviraia, 58, Georgian politician and security officer.
- Gideon Njoku, 63, Nigerian footballer and coach, cardiac arrest.
- Vivek Shauq, 47, Indian actor, comedian, writer and singer, heart attack.
- A. W. B. Simpson, 79, British legal historian.
- María Elena Walsh, 80, Argentine musician, poet and writer ("Manuelita la tortuga"), after long illness.
- John Ward, 90, American Roman Catholic prelate, Auxiliary Bishop of Los Angeles (1963–1996).
- Margaret Whiting, 86, American pop singer ("A Tree in the Meadow", "Moonlight in Vermont"), natural causes.
- Lomasontfo Dludlu, Swazi politician.

=== 11 ===
- Zoltán Berczik, 73, Hungarian table tennis player and coach.
- Ralph Campbell, 64, American politician, North Carolina state auditor (1992–2004), lung cancer.
- Dame Barbara Clayton, 88, British pathologist.
- Zoë Dominic, 90, English photographer.
- Milan Ercegan, 94, Yugoslavian president of the International Federation of Associated Wrestling Styles (1972–2002).
- Kozo Haraguchi, 100, Japanese track and field athlete, respiratory failure.
- André Marchand, 84, Canadian politician, member of the Legislative Assembly of Quebec.
- Matti Mattson, 94, American veteran of the Spanish Civil War (Abraham Lincoln Brigade).
- John Modinos, 84, Cypriot opera baritone, heart failure.
- David Nelson, 74, American actor (The Adventures of Ozzie and Harriet, Peyton Place, Cry-Baby), colon cancer.
- Knut Olsen, 57, Norwegian journalist and television presenter, cancer.
- Alfio Peraboni, 56, Italian Olympic bronze medal-winning (1980, 1984) sailor, cerebral hemorrhage.
- Won-il Rhee, 50, South Korean digital art curator, heart attack.
- Ze'ev Segal, 63, Israeli jurist and legal analyst.
- Marcel Trudel, 93, Canadian historian and author, cancer.

=== 12 ===
- Aswismarmo, 85, Indonesian major general.
- Clemar Bucci, 90, Argentine racing driver.
- Hans Bütikofer, 95, Swiss Olympic silver medal-winning (1936) bobsledder.
- Howard Engleman, 91, American college basketball player.
- Paul Picerni, 88, American actor (The Untouchables, The Young Marrieds, House of Wax), heart attack.
- Terje Sagvolden, 65, Norwegian neuroscientist.
- Kenneth Stevenson, 61, British Anglican prelate, Bishop of Portsmouth (1995–2009), cancer.
- Dawn Sylvia-Stasiewicz, 52, American dog trainer (Bo) and author, respiratory distress.

=== 13 ===
- Wali Khan Babar, 29, Pakistani journalist, gunshot.
- Alan Butler, 80, South African priest.
- Frank Calabro, 86, Italian-born Australian transport operator and politician, MLC (1970–1988).
- Mick Cremin, 87, Australian rugby union footballer.
- Egon Drews, 84, German Olympic bronze medal-winning (1952) flatwater canoer.
- Tuviah Friedman, 88, Israeli Nazi hunter.
- Michel Gratton, 58, Canadian journalist, Press Secretary to Prime Minister Brian Mulroney (1984–1987).
- Albert Heijn Jr., 83, Dutch entrepreneur, owner of the Albert Heijn supermarket chain.
- Greg Hjorth, 47, Australian mathematician and chess player, heart attack.
- Hellmut Lange, 87, German actor (Serenade for Two Spies, Diamond Safari).
- Charles Muscat, 48, Maltese footballer.
- Prabhakar Panshikar, 79, Indian stage actor, after long illness.
- Allen Salter, 74, Canadian Olympic weightlifter.
- Ellen Stewart, 91, American theater director.
- Marian Woyna Orlewicz, 97, Polish cross country skier.

=== 14 ===
- Eduardo Armella, 82, Argentine Olympic shooter.
- Sun Axelsson, 75, Swedish novelist.
- Julio Barragán, 82, Argentine painter.
- Salvatore Cancemi, 68, Italian mafiosi, stroke.
- Georgia Carroll, 91, American fashion model and actress (Yankee Doodle Dandy).
- David Coren, 93, Israeli politician, member of the Knesset (1969–1977).
- Dr. Creep, 69, American television host.
- Stephanie Glaser, 90, Swiss actress.
- Marty Gold, 95, American composer, pianist and bandleader.
- Toshiyuki Hosokawa, 70, Japanese actor, acute subdural hematoma.
- Liu Huaqing, 94, Chinese naval commander (1982–1988).
- Peter Post, 77, Dutch cyclist, winner of the 1964 Paris–Roubaix event.
- Betty Mae Tiger Jumper, 88, American health official and tribal leader, first woman to lead the Seminole tribe (1967–71).
- Trish Keenan, 42, British musician, Broadcast.
- Ben Wada, 80, Japanese television director, esophageal cancer.
- Per Olav Wiken, 73, Norwegian Olympic silver medal-winning 1968 sailor.

=== 15 ===
- Ellen Alaküla, 83, Estonian actress and theatre teacher.
- Gaston Allaire, 94, Canadian musicologist.
- Minhaj Barna, 89, Pakistani journalist.
- Kenneth Grant, 86, British occultist and writer, head of the Typhonian Order.
- Roy Hartsfield, 85, American baseball player (Boston Braves) and first manager of Toronto Blue Jays, complications of liver cancer.
- Harvey James, 58, Australian musician (Sherbet), lung cancer.
- Michael Langham, 91, English stage director and actor, complications from a chest infection.
- Romulus Linney, 80, American playwright, lung cancer.
- Nat Lofthouse, 85, English footballer (Bolton Wanderers, England).
- Ed Lowe, 64, American journalist (Newsday, The Long Island Press), liver cancer.
- Mike Vibert, 60, Jersey politician, Minister for Education, Sport and Culture (2005–2008), heart attack.
- Susannah York, 72, English actress (Tom Jones, Superman, They Shoot Horses, Don't They?), BAFTA winner (1971), bone marrow cancer.
- Hilde Zach, 68, Austrian politician, Mayor of Innsbruck (2002–2010).
- Zeng Xianyi, 74, Chinese professor of legal history.

=== 16 ===
- Augusto Algueró, 76, Spanish composer and conductor, cardiac arrest.
- Miguel Ángel Álvarez, 88, Puerto Rican comedian and actor, respiratory failure.
- Celestino Armas, 75, Venezuelan engineer and politician, Minister for Energy and Mines (1989–1992).
- Julian Asquith, 2nd Earl of Oxford and Asquith, 94, British aristocrat and diplomat, Administrator of Saint Lucia (1958–1962), Governor of the Seychelles (1962–1967).
- Hovhannes Bedros XVIII Kasparian, 83, Egyptian-born Lebanese Armenian Catholic prelate, Patriarch of Cilicia (1982–1998).
- Milton Levine, 97, American entrepreneur, inventor of Uncle Milton's Ant Farm.
- Steve Prestwich, 56, British-born Australian drummer (Cold Chisel, Little River Band) and songwriter, brain tumour.
- Reinaldo Pünder, 72, German-born Brazilian Roman Catholic prelate, Bishop of Coroatá (since 1978).
- Ye Peida, 95, Chinese telecommunications engineer, President of the Beijing Institute of Posts and Telecommunications.
- Stefka Yordanova, 64, Bulgarian sprinter and middle-distance runner.

=== 17 ===
- Marina Abroskina, 43, Russian basketball player, brain tumor.
- Jürgen Barth, 67, German Olympic cyclist.
- Marcello Bazzana, 57, Italian Olympic ski jumper.
- Brian Boobbyer, 82, English rugby union player and cricketer.
- David Bradby, 68, British theatre scholar.
- Sjonni Brink, 36, Icelandic musician and singer, complications from a stroke.
- Sir Bernard Crossland, 87, British engineer, Pro-Vice-Chancellor of Queen's University Belfast (1978–1982).
- Perry Currin, 82, American baseball player (St. Louis Browns), heart failure.
- Keith Davey, 84, Canadian politician and campaign organizer, Senator (1966–1996).
- Gita Dey, 79, Indian actress, cardiac arrest.
- Jean Dutourd, 91, French novelist.
- Vern Kaiser, 85, Canadian ice hockey player (Montreal Canadiens).
- Don Kirshner, 76, American record producer and songwriter, host of Don Kirshner's Rock Concert, heart failure.
- Robert W. Mackenzie, 82, Canadian labour organizer and politician, Ontario Minister of Labour (1990–1994).
- John Ross, 72, American activist, author and journalist, liver cancer.
- Shinichiro Sakurai, 81, Japanese automotive engineer, heart failure.

=== 18 ===
- Charlie Cowdrey, 77, American football coach (Illinois State University, Southwestern College).
- George Crowe, 89, American baseball player (St. Louis Cardinals).
- Jerre DeNoble, 87, American baseball player (All-American Girls Professional Baseball League).
- Eugenia Escudero, 96, Mexican Olympic fencer.
- Al Grunwald, 80, American baseball player.
- Duncan Hall, 85, Australian rugby league player.
- John Herivel, 92, British codebreaker at Bletchley Park.
- Antonín Kubálek, 75, Czech-born Canadian pianist, complications from a brain tumour.
- Jim McManus, 70, American tennis player.
- Cristian Pațurcă, 46, Romanian composer.
- Milton Rogovin, 101, American documentary photographer.
- Jacques Sarr, 76, Senegalese Roman Catholic prelate, Bishop of Thiès (since 1986).
- Sargent Shriver, 95, American diplomat and politician, Ambassador to France (1968–1970), vice presidential nominee (1972), complications from Alzheimer's disease.
- Edgar Tafel, 98, American architect.

=== 19 ===
- John Barnes, 94, Australian cricketer.
- Neva Egan, 96, American educator, First Lady of Alaska (1959–1966, 1970–1974), widow of William Allen Egan.
- George Franck, 92, American football player (New York Giants).
- Wayne R. Grisham, 88, American politician, Representative from California (1979–1983).
- Mihai Ionescu, 74, Romanian footballer (Petrolul Ploieşti, Romania).
- Jose Kusugak, 60, Canadian Inuit leader, bladder cancer.
- James O'Gwynn, 82, American country music singer, pneumonia.
- Bryce Postles, 79, New Zealand cricketer.
- Ramiro Saraiva Guerreiro, 92, Brazilian politician, Minister of External Relations (1979–1985).
- Bob Scott, 79, Australian politician, member of the Queensland Legislative Assembly for Cook (1977–1989).
- Wilfrid Sheed, 80, English-born American novelist and essayist, urosepsis.
- Carla Swart, 23, South African cyclist, traffic collision.
- Hira Devi Waiba, 71, Nepali folk singer, injuries from a fire.
- Bob Young, 87, American news journalist and anchor (ABC World News).

=== 20 ===
- Kenth Andersson, 66, Swedish middle-distance runner.
- Maurice Brown, 91, British Royal Air Force fighter pilot.
- José Luis Castro Aguirre, 67, Mexican ichthyologist.
- Eduardo Davino, 81, Italian Roman Catholic prelate, Bishop of Palestrina (1997–2005).
- Bruce Gordon, 94, American actor (The Untouchables, Peyton Place, Piranha).
- Ernest McCulloch, 84, Canadian biologist.
- Miesque, 27, French racehorse, euthanized.
- F. A. Nettelbeck, 60, American poet.
- José Ortiz, 63, Puerto Rican baseball player.
- Sonia Peres, 87, Israeli First Lady.
- Reynolds Price, 77, American author, professor at Duke University, heart attack.
- John Jacob Rhodes III, 67, American politician, U.S. Representative from Arizona (1987–1993).
- Eugénio Salessu, 87, Angolan Roman Catholic prelate, Bishop of Malanje (1977–1998).
- Sexy Cora, 23, German pornographic actress, complications from breast enlargement surgery.
- William F. Shipley, 89, American linguist, complications from pneumonia.
- Alan Uglow, 69, British-born American painter, lung cancer.
- Gus Zernial, 87, American baseball player (Oakland Athletics, Detroit Tigers, Chicago White Sox), heart failure.

=== 21 ===
- Theoni V. Aldredge, 88, Greek-born American costume designer (Ghostbusters, Network, The Great Gatsby), Oscar winner (1975).
- Robert Cohu, 99, French Olympic basketball player.
- Peter Demos, 87, Australian Olympic basketball player.
- Jay Garner, 82, American actor (Pennies from Heaven, Buck Rogers in the 25th Century), respiratory failure.
- Tony Geiss, 86, American television writer and composer (Sesame Street), Emmy award winner, complications from a fall.
- Emanuele Gerada, 90, Maltese Roman Catholic prelate, Titular Archbishop of Nomentum, Apostolic Nuncio to Ireland (1989–1995).
- Herb Gray, 76, American-born Canadian football player (Winnipeg Blue Bombers).
- Barney F. Hajiro, 94, American soldier, formerly the oldest living Medal of Honor recipient.
- Wally Hughes, 76, English football coach.
- Dennis Oppenheim, 72, American artist, liver cancer.
- E. V. V. Satyanarayana, 54, Indian Telugu movie director, throat cancer and cardiac arrest.

=== 22 ===
- Virgil Akins, 82, American boxer, world welterweight champion (1958).
- Solange Bertrand, 97, French artist.
- Sir Chandos Blair, 91, British army general.
- Ralph Felton, 78, American football player (Washington Redskins).
- Aslam Khokhar, 91, Pakistani cricketer.
- Quentin Orlando, 91, American politician, Member of the Pennsylvania State Senate (1973–1980).
- Park Wan-suh, 79, South Korean novelist, cancer.
- René Piché, 79, Canadian politician.
- Bobby Poe, 77, American pop singer, songwriter and promoter, blood clot.
- Gary Schreider, 76, Canadian football player.
- William Schreyer, 83, American business executive, chairman and CEO of Merrill Lynch (1985–1993).
- Lois Smith, 81, Canadian dancer (National Ballet of Canada).
- Tullia Zevi, 91, Italian journalist and politician, leader of the Italian Jewish community.

=== 23 ===
- Danny Brabham, 69, American football player (Houston Oilers, Cincinnati Bengals).
- Ed Dyas, 71, American football player (Auburn Tigers), member of the College Football Hall of Fame, stomach cancer.
- Peter Gibb, 56, Australian criminal, heart attack.
- Ole Kopreitan, 73, Norwegian political activist.
- Jack LaLanne, 96, American fitness and nutritional expert, pneumonia.
- Poppa Neutrino, 77, American adventurer, crossed Atlantic Ocean on raft made of discarded material, heart failure.
- Louise Raggio, 91, American lawyer.
- Novica Tadić, 62, Yugoslavian poet.
- Neil Truscott, 88, Australian diplomat.

=== 24 ===
- Alec Boden, 85, Scottish footballer (Celtic).
- Bernd Eichinger, 61, German film producer (The NeverEnding Story, Resident Evil, Fantastic Four), heart attack.
- David Frye, 77, American satirist and Richard Nixon impersonator, cardiopulmonary arrest.
- Phil Gallie, 71, British politician, MP for Ayr (1992–97), MSP for South of Scotland (1999–2007).
- Barrie Lee Hall Jr., 61, American jazz trumpeter and band leader (Duke Ellington).
- Basil F. Heath, 93, Canadian-born American Mohawk actor and stuntman.
- Bhimsen Joshi, 88, Indian musician, Bharat Ratna laureate.
- Francisco Mata, 78, Venezuelan folk singer and composer.
- Jack Matheson, 86, Canadian sports journalist.
- Samuel Ruiz, 86, Mexican Roman Catholic prelate, Bishop of San Cristóbal de las Casas (1959–2000).
- Hanna Yablonska, 29, Ukrainian playwright, bombing.

=== 25 ===
- Daniel Bell, 91, American sociologist.
- Vincent Cronin, 86, British writer.
- Alison Geissler, 103, British glass engraver.
- Bill Holden, 82, English footballer.
- Arto Javanainen, 51, Finnish ice hockey player (Pittsburgh Penguins), after long illness.
- K. Satchidananda Murty, 86, Indian philosopher.
- Ganga Bahadur Thapa, 75–76, Nepalese Olympic runner.

=== 26 ===
- Anna Avanzini, 93, Italian Olympic gymnast.
- Robert Crook, 81, American politician, member of the Mississippi State Senate (1964–1992).
- Mike DeBardeleben, 70, American criminal, pneumonia.
- John Herbert, 81, Brazilian actor, emphysema.
- Gladys Horton, 65, American R&B singer (The Marvelettes), complications from a stroke.
- David Kato, 46, Ugandan gay rights activist, bludgeoned with hammer.
- R. F. Langley, 72, British poet and diarist.
- Charlie Louvin, 83, American country music singer (The Louvin Brothers), pancreatic cancer.
- María Mercader, 92, Spanish actress.
- Eddie Mordue, 83, British saxophonist.
- Tore Sjöstrand, 89, Swedish Olympic gold medal-winning (1948) athlete.

=== 27 ===
- Charlie Callas, 86, American comedian and actor (Pete's Dragon, Silent Movie, Switch).
- Liana Dumitrescu, 38, Romanian politician, member of the Chamber of Deputies (since 2004), stroke.
- William L. Eagleton, 84, American diplomat.
- Mārtiņš Freimanis, 33, Latvian musician (F.L.Y.) and actor, performed at Eurovision Song Contest 2003, influenza.
- Henri Goosen, 84, French Olympic diver.
- Hannemor Gram, 92, Norwegian Olympic alpine skier.
- Boyd Kirkland, 60, American animation producer and director (Batman: The Animated Series, X-Men: Evolution, G.I. Joe: A Real American Hero), pulmonary fibrosis.
- Wenceslau Malta, 79, Brazilian Olympic modern pentathlete.
- Vaughn Mancha, 89, American football player (Boston Yanks), heart failure.
- Svein Mathisen, 58, Norwegian footballer (IK Start), cancer.
- Butch McCord, 85, American Negro league baseball player.
- Diana Norman, 77, British author and journalist.
- Don Rondo, 81, American singer ("White Silver Sands"), lung cancer.
- Tøger Seidenfaden, 53, Danish newspaper editor-in-chief (Politiken), cancer.
- Guy J. Velella, 66, American politician and convicted criminal, New York State Assemblyman (1973–1982) and State Senator (1986–2004), lung cancer.
- Kjeld Vibe, 83, Norwegian diplomat, ambassador to the United States.
- William Williams, 83, Canadian metallurgical engineer.

=== 28 ===
- Hamida Barmaki, 41, Afghan law professor and human rights activist, suicide bomb attack.
- William Bartley, 94, American pilot.
- Ken Carpenter, 84, American football player (Cleveland Browns).
- Raymond Cohen, 91, British violinist.
- Karen Cromie, 31, British Paralympian, suicide by jumping.
- Sushil Kumar Dhara, 99, Indian revolutionary.
- Dariush Homayoon, 82, Iranian politician and journalist, Minister of Information and Tourism (1977–1978).
- Megan McNeil, 20, Canadian singer, adrenal cancer.
- Dame Margaret Price, 69, British soprano, heart failure.

=== 29 ===
- Ian Abdulla, 63–64, Australian artist, cancer.
- Hussein El-Alfy, 83, Egyptian rower.
- Milton Babbitt, 94, American composer.
- Zahra Bahrami, 46, Dutch-Iranian protestor and convicted drug trafficker, execution by hanging.
- William J. Bate, 76, American politician.
- José Llopis Corona, 92, Spanish footballer.
- Bruce Jackson, 62, American audio engineer, plane crash.
- Loreen Rice Lucas, 96, Canadian author.
- Hemayel Martina, 20, Curaçaon poet, complications from a traffic collision.
- Raymond McClean, 78, Northern Irish politician and doctor, Mayor of Derry (1973–1974).
- Emilio Ogñénovich, 88, Argentine Roman Catholic prelate, Archbishop of Mercedes-Luján (1982–2000).
- Nora Sun, 72, Chinese-born American diplomat, businesswoman and author, granddaughter of Sun Yat-sen, injuries from car crash.
- Dorothy Thompson, 87, British social historian.
- Emanuel Vardi, 95, Israeli-born American violist, cancer.
- Liza Vorfi, 86, Albanian stage actress, after long illness.
- Norman Wilkinson, 79, English football player.

=== 30 ===
- Brian Barritt, 76, English author, artist, and counterculture figure.
- John Barry, 77, British film score composer (From Russia with Love, Chaplin, Out of Africa), five-time Oscar winner, heart attack.
- Ajahn Maha Bua, 97, Thai Buddhist monk.
- J. Elliott Burch, 86, American hall of fame racehorse trainer, pneumonia.
- Michael Herzog, 58, Austrian ice hockey player.
- Charles Nolan, 53, American fashion designer, cancer of the head and neck.
- Bernard O'Brien, 96, American politician, member of the Pennsylvania House of Representatives (1965–1980).
- Ian R. Porteous, 80, British mathematician.
- Hisaye Yamamoto, 89, American author.

=== 31 ===
- Hernán Alvarado Solano, 65, Colombian Roman Catholic prelate, Vicar Apostolic of Guapi (since 2001).
- Bartolomeu Anania, 89, Romanian Orthodox Metropolitan of Cluj-Napoca, Alba Iulia, Crişana and Maramureş (since 1993).
- A. C. Bartulis, 83, American businessman and politician.
- Raymond Challinor, 81, British historian.
- Nikolay Dorizo, 87, Russian poet.
- Zilpha Grant, 91, British Olympic swimmer.
- Stuart Hood, 95, Scottish writer and television executive, controller of BBC Television (1961–1964).
- Charles Kaman, 91, American aeronautical engineer, founder of Kaman Aircraft and Ovation Guitar Company.
- Ningthoukhongjam Khelchandra, 90, Indian writer, lexicographer and historian.
- Tally Monastyryov, 71, Soviet Olympic skier.
- Nildo Parente, 76–77, Brazilian actor, stroke.
- Mark Ryan, 51, British musician (Adam and the Ants), complications from liver damage.
- Charles Sellier, 67, American film and television producer (The Life and Times of Grizzly Adams).
- Michael Tolan, 85, American actor (The Greatest Story Ever Told, The Mary Tyler Moore Show, Presumed Innocent), heart disease and renal failure.
- Norman Uprichard, 82, Northern Irish footballer.
- Doc Williams, 96, American country music performer.
