= 2011 in Russia =

- Decades: 1990s; 2000s; 2010s; 2020s
- See also: History of Russia; Timeline of Russian history; List of years in Russia

Events in the year 2011 in Russia.

== Incumbents ==
- President of Russia – Dmitry Medvedev (United Russia)
- Prime Minister of Russia – Vladimir Putin (United Russia)

=== Governors ===
- Amur Oblast: Oleg Kozhemyako (ER)
- Arkhangelsk Oblast: Ilya Mikhalchuk (ER)
- Astrakhan Oblast: Alexander Zhilkin (ER)
- Belgorod Oblast: Yevgeny Savchenko (ER)
- Bryansk Oblast: Nikolay Denin (ER)
- Chelyabinsk Oblast: Mikhail Yurevich (ER)
- Irkutsk Oblast: Dmitry Mezentsev (ER)
- Ivanovo Oblast: Mikhail Men (ER)
- Kaliningrad Oblast: Nikolay Tsukanov (ER)
- Kaluga Oblast: Anatoly Artamonov (ER)
- Kemerovo Oblast: Aman Tuleyev (ER)
- Kirov Oblast: Nikita Belykh (Independent)
- Kostroma Oblast: Igor Slyunyayev (ER)
- Kurgan Oblast: Oleg Bogomolov (ER)
- Kursk Oblast: Aleksandr Mikhailov (ER)
- Leningrad Oblast: Valery Serdyukov (ER)
- Lipetsk Oblast: Oleg Korolyov (ER)
- Magadan Oblast: Nikolai Dudov (ER)
- Moscow Oblast: Boris Gromov (ER)
- Murmansk Oblast: Dmitry Dmitrienko (ER)
- Nizhny Novgorod Oblast: Valery Shantsev (ER)
- Novgorod Oblast: Sergey Mitin (ER)
- Novosibirsk Oblast: Vasily Yurchenko (ER)
- Omsk Oblast: Leonid Polezhayev (ER)
- Orenburg Oblast: Yury Berg (ER)
- Oryol Oblast: Alexander Kozlov (ER)
- Penza Oblast: Vasily Bochkarev (ER)
- Pskov Oblast: Andrey Turchak (ER)
- Rostov Oblast: Vasily Golubev (ER)
- Ryazan Oblast: Oleg Kovalyov (ER)
- Sakhalin Oblast: Alexander Khoroshavin (ER)
- Samara Oblast: Vladimir Artemyakov (ER)
- Saratov Oblast: Pavel Ipatov (ER)
- Smolensk Oblast: Sergey Antufyev (ER)
- Tambov Oblast: Oleg Betin (ER)
- Tomsk Oblast: Viktor Kress (ER)
- Tula Oblast: Vyacheslav Dudka (until July 29, ER), Vladimir Gruzdev (starting August 18, ER)
- Tver Oblast: Dmitry Zelenin (until June 16, ER), Andrey Shevelyov (starting June 16, ER)
- Tyumen Oblast: Vladimir Yakushev (ER)
- Ulyanovsk Oblast: Sergey Morozov (ER)
- Vladimir Oblast: Nikolay Vinogradov (CPRF)
- Volgograd Oblast: Anatoly Brovko (ER)
- Vologda Oblast: Vyacheslav Pozgalyov (until December 14, ER), Oleg Kuvshinnikov (starting December 28, ER)
- Voronezh Oblast: Alexey Gordeyev (ER)
- Yaroslavl Oblast: Sergey Vakhrukov (ER)
- Jewish Autonomous Oblast: Alexander Vinnikov (ER)

== Events ==
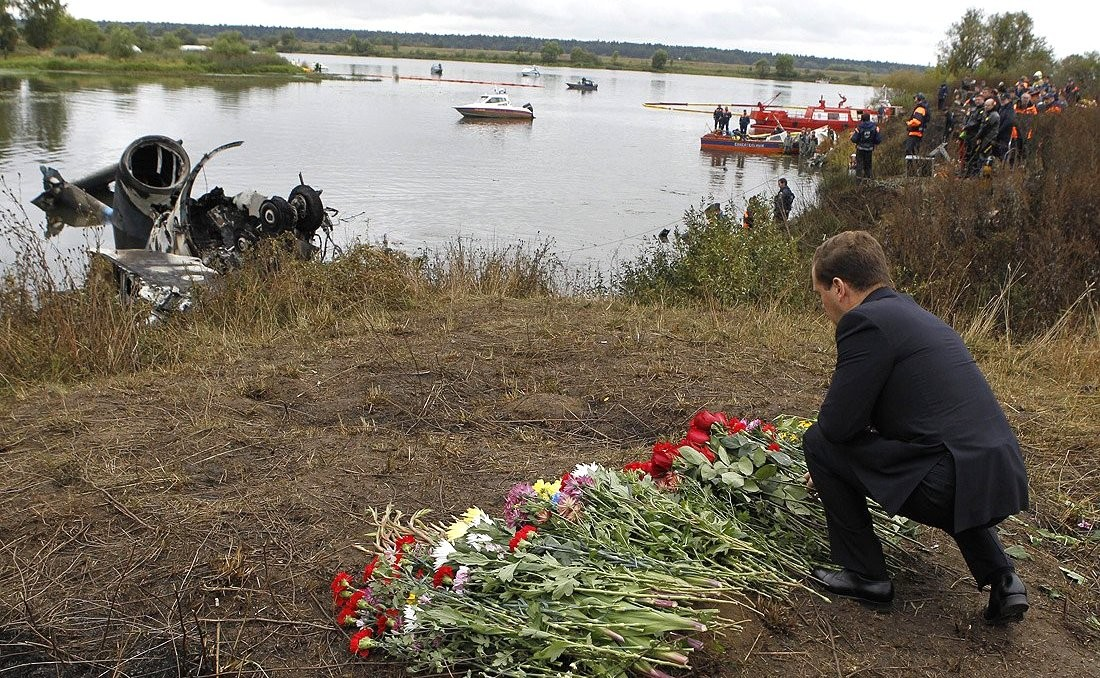
2011 Lokomotiv Yaroslavl plane crash: Russian president Dmitry Medvedev lays flowers in front of the remains of the rear stabilizer of the Yak-42 that carried the Lokomotiv Yaroslavl hockey squad.

- January 1 - Kolavia Flight 348: Four people are killed and around 40 injured after a passenger plane explodes in Surgut in eastern Russia.
- January 22 - At least two people are killed in a blaze at a shopping centre in the southwest Russian city of Ufa.
- January 24 - 2011 Domodedovo International Airport bombing: At least 35 people are killed and 130 injured after a suicide bombing at Domodedovo International Airport in the Russian capital Moscow.
- January 26 - Russian president Dmitry Medvedev fires top airport security officials, two days after the suicide bombing at Moscow's Domodedovo International Airport.
- February 9 - Serial blasts rock Russia's Grozny, at least five people are wounded.
- February 28 - Rosatom, the Russian state nuclear energy corporation, explains that the Bushehr Nuclear Power Plant has been delayed in opening due to damage to the nuclear reactor's cooling pumps.
- March 1 - As part of the Russian police reform, the Russian law enforcers' name was changed from "Militsiya" (militia) to "Politsiya" (police).
- March 27 - Russia switching to permanent daylight saving time (DST) under a decree President Dmitry Medvedev signed a month earlier.
- April 18 - The Movement Against Illegal Immigration was banned by the Moscow City Court.
- May 2 - The UN Security Council fails to agree a statement to condemn the killing of Syrian protesters, as Russia and China block a statement proposed by Britain, France, Germany and Portugal that would have condemned the violence, which has led to hundreds of dead, and backed calls for an independent investigation.
- May 4 - Russian security forces kill Doger Sevdet, an al-Qaeda emissary who fought alongside Chechen insurgents, in the northern Caucasus region of Russia.
- May 6 - Russia launches an urgent rescue mission after the nuclear-powered icebreaker Taymyr in its fleet develops a nuclear leak in the frozen seas of the Arctic and was forced to abandon its mission.
- May 6 - A court in Russia sentences ultranationalist Nikita Tikhonov to life imprisonment for the murder of human rights lawyer Stanislav Markelov and journalist Anastasia Baburova in 2009.
- May 19 - The Eurasian Economic Community, led by Russia, offers Belarus a $3 billion bailout package.
- May 30 - Documents discovered in a Russian archive suggest that Adolf Hitler ordered Rudolf Hess to go to the United Kingdom to negotiate with Winston Churchill over a World War II peace deal in 1941.
- June 2 - 42 people are injured and 13,000 people evacuated from settlements in Russia's Udmurt Republic following an ammo depot fire.
- June 3 - 57 people are injured, and 28,000 people have been forced to evacuate, following an explosion at an army munitions depot in Russia's western Ural Mountains region.
- July 10 - was a class 785/OL800 Russian river cruise ship Bulgaria which operated in the Volga-Don basin. sank in the Kuybyshev Reservoir of the Volga River near Syukeyevo, Kamsko-Ustyinsky District, Tatarstan, with 201 passengers and crew aboard when sailing from the town of Bolgar to the regional capital, Kazan. The catastrophe led to 122 confirmed deaths (bodies recovered and identified).
- July 20 - Beer is legally reclassified from a foodstuff to an alcoholic drink so that its sale will be more strongly controlled.
- September 7 - 2011 Lokomotiv Yaroslavl plane crash: A Yak Service Yak-42 carrying the KHL hockey team Lokomotiv Yaroslavl crashes near Yaroslavl, Russia, killing 44.

=== Popular culture ===
Sports

- January 5 - Russia men's national junior ice hockey team won the 2011 World Junior Ice Hockey Championships.
- April 17 - The Russian professional basketball team UNICS Kazan wins the Eurocup Basketball competition.

== Notable deaths ==
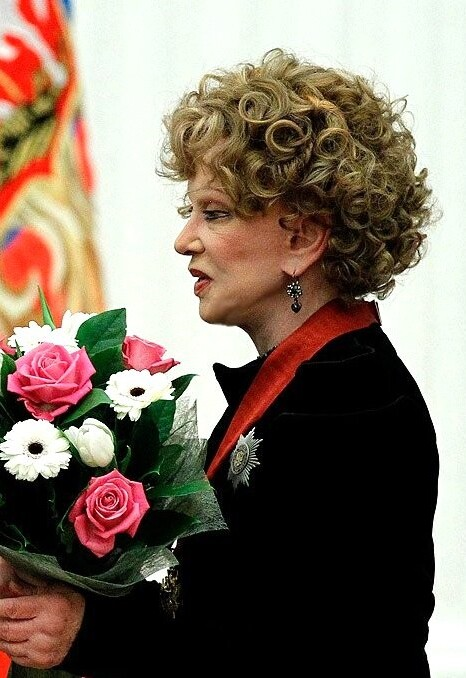
Lyudmila Gurchenko

=== January ===
- January 1 -
  - Nikolay Abramov, 26, Russian footballer.
  - George Alexandrovich Ball, 83, Russian writer.
- January 4 - Chrysanth Chepil, 73, Russian Orthodox prelate, Metropolitan of Vyatka-Slobodskoy.
- January 6 - Pyotr Sumin, 64, Russian politician, Governor of Chelyabinsk Oblast (1996–2010).
- January 31 - Nikolay Dorizo, 87, Russian poet.

=== February ===
- February 3 - Tatyana Shmyga, 82, Russian operetta singer and film actress (Hussar Ballad), People's Artist of the USSR, vascular disease.
- February 24 - Sergei Nikitich Kovalev, 91, Russian designer of nuclear submarines.
- February 25 - Valery Bezruchenko, 70, Russian clarinetist and music teacher.

=== March ===
- March 4 - Mikhail Simonov, 81, Russian aircraft designer, chief designer of the Sukhoi Design Bureau (1983–2011), after long illness.
- March 13 - Vitaly Vulf, 80, Russian theater critic and television host.
- March 14 - Eduard Gushchin, 70, Russian Olympic bronze medal-winning (1968) athlete.
- March 21 - Nikolai Andrianov, 58, Russian gymnast, most medaled athlete at the 1976 Summer Olympics, after long illness.
- March 25 - Pavel Leonov, 90, Russian naïve artist.
- March 26 - Alexander Barykin, 59, Russian musician, heart attack.
- March 30 - Lyudmila Gurchenko, 75, Russian film actress and singer, People's Artist of the USSR.
- March 31 - Vassili Kononov, 88, Russian military veteran and war criminal.

=== April ===
- April 1 - George Gryaznov, 77, Russian Orthodox Archbishop of Chelyabinsk and Zlatoust (1989–1996), stroke.
- April 3 - Yevgeny Lyadin, 84, Russian footballer.
- April 6 - Igor Birman, 85, Russian-born American writer and economist.
- April 10 - Mikhail Rusyayev, 46, Russian footballer.
- April 27 - Igor Kon, 82, Russian philosopher, psychologist and sexologist.
- April 28 - Yulia Rumyantseva, 42, Russian editor and film producer, suicide by jumping.
- April 29 - Vladimir Krainev, 67, Russian pianist, People's Artist of the USSR, aortic aneurysm.

=== May ===
- May 2 -
  - Alexander Lazarev, 73, Russian actor.
  - Leonid Abalkin, 80, Russian economist.
- May 8 - Galina Urbanovich, 93, Russian Olympic gold and silver medal-winning (1952) gymnast.
- May 19 - Vladimir Ryzhkin, 80, Russian Olympic gold medal-winning (1956) footballer.
- May 22 - Nina Yablonskaya, 46, Russian businesswoman and beauty salon director.

=== June ===
- June 7 - Maksud Sadikov, 48, Russian Islamic scholar and theologian, shot.
- June 10 - Yuri Budanov, 47, Russian military officer and war criminal, shot.
- June 15 - Pavel Stolbov, 81, Russian gymnast, 1956 Olympic gold medalist.
- June 18 - Yelena Bonner, 88, Russian human rights activist, after long illness.
- June 20 -
  - Magomet Isayev, 83, Russian Esperantist, translator and linguist.
  - Vladimir Pettay, 38, Russian football referee, plane crash.
- June 23 - Vladislav Achalov, 65, Russian general and activist.

=== July ===
- July 7 - Yuri Kukin, 78, Russian singer-songwriter.
- July 14 - Vladimir Kosinsky, 66, Russian swimmer, 1968 Olympic silver and bronze medalist.
- July 19 - Karen Khachaturian, 90, Russian composer.
- July 21 - Yevgeny Lopatin, 93, Russian Olympic silver medal-winning (1952) weightlifter.
- July 22 - Dmitri Furman, 68, Russian historian and philosopher, after long illness.
- July 27 - Eduard Rozovsky, 84, Russian cinematographer (Amphibian Man, White Sun of the Desert), car accident.

=== August ===
- August 2 -
  - Asadullo Gulomov, 58, Tajik politician, Deputy Prime Minister (since 2006).
  - Andrey Kapitsa, 80, Russian geographer and explorer, discovered and named Lake Vostok.
- August 3 - Nikolai Arnoldovich Petrov, 68, Russian pianist.
- August 14 - Yekaterina Golubeva, 44, Russian actress.
- August 27 - Iya Savvina, 75, Russian actress, People's Artist of the USSR.
- August 30 - Alla Bayanova, 97, Russian singer, People's Artist of Russia, cancer.
- August 31 - Valery Rozhdestvensky, 72, Soviet cosmonaut.

=== September ===
- September 29 -
  - Tatyana Lioznova, 87, Russian film director (Seventeen Moments of Spring), People's Artist of the USSR.
  - Vera Popkova, 68, Russian athlete, Olympic bronze medalist (1968).

=== December ===
- December 24 - Vitaly Tseshkovsky, 67, Russian chess Grandmaster.

== See also ==
- List of Russian films of 2011
