= Speed skating at the 1932 Winter Olympics – Women's 1500 metres =

Women's 1500 metres speed skating at the III Olympic Winter Games
- Pictogram for speed skating
- Venue: James B. Sheffield Olympic Skating Rink
- Date: 10 February 1932
- Competitors: 10 from 2 nations
- Winning time: 3:00.6

The 1500 metres speed skating event for women was part of the demonstration sport programme of the 1932 Winter Olympics. The competition was held on Wednesday, February 10, 1932.

Ten speed skaters from two nations competed.

Like all other speed skating events at this Olympics the competition was held in pack-style format, having all competitors skate at the same time.

== Podium ==
1st Place	2nd Place	3rd Place
Kit Klein; United States	Jean Wilson; Canada	Helen Bina; United States

== Records ==
These were the standing world and Olympic records (in minutes) prior to the 1932 Winter Olympics.

World record	3:10.4(*)	(Poland) Zofia Nehringowa	Davos (SUI)	January 10, 1932
Olympic record		-		

(*) The record was set in a high altitude venue (more than 1000 metres above sea level) and on naturally frozen ice.

All three runs were faster than the world record, but in pack-style format.

== Results ==
=== First round ===
Heat 1

Place	Name	Time	Qual.
1	Lela Brooks-Potter (CAN)	2:54.0	Q
2	Helen Bina (USA)		Q
3	Geraldine Mackie (CAN)		Q
4	Elsie Muller-McLave (USA)		
5	Hattie Donaldson (CAN)		

Heat 2

Place	Name	Time	Qual.
1	Jean Wilson (CAN)	2:54.2	Q
2	Kit Klein (USA)		Q
3	Dorothy Franey (USA)		Q
4	Elizabeth Dubois (USA)		
5	Florence Hurd (CAN)		

=== Final ===
Place	Name	Time
1	Kit Klein (USA)	3:00.6
2	Jean Wilson (CAN)	
3	Helen Bina (USA)	
4	Geraldine Mackie (CAN)	
5	Dorothy Franey (USA)	
6	Lela Brooks-Potter (CAN)	
