= Speed skating at the 1932 Winter Olympics – Women's 1000 metres =

Women's 1000 metres speed skating at the III Olympic Winter Games
- Pictogram for speed skating
- Venue: James B. Sheffield Olympic Skating Rink
- Date: 9 February 1932
- Competitors: 10 from 2 nations
- Winning time: 2:04.0

The 1000 metres speed skating event for women was part of the demonstration sport programme of the 1932 Winter Olympics. The competition was held on Tuesday, February 9, 1932.

Ten speed skaters from two nations competed.

Like all other speed skating events at this Olympics the competition was held in pack-style format, having all competitors skate at the same time.

== Podium ==
1st Place	2nd Place	3rd Place
Elizabeth Dubois; United States	Hattie Donaldson; Canada	Dorothy Franey; United States

== Records ==
These were the standing world and Olympic records (in minutes) prior to the 1932 Winter Olympics.

World record	2:03.4(*)	(Poland) Zofia Nehringowa	Engelberg (SUI)	January 17, 1932
Olympic record		-		

(*) The record was set in a high altitude venue (more than 1000 metres above sea level) and on naturally frozen ice.

== Results ==
=== First round ===
Heat 1

Place	Name	Time	Qual.
1	Lela Brooks-Potter (CAN)	2:01.2	Q
2	Geraldine Mackie (CAN)		Q
3	Hattie Donaldson (CAN)		Q
4	Helen Bina (USA)		
–	Elsie Muller-McLave (USA)	DNF	

Heat 2

Place	Name	Time	Qual.
1	Jean Wilson (CAN)	2:06.0	Q
2	Elizabeth Dubois (USA)		Q
3	Dorothy Franey (USA)		Q
–	Florence Hurd (CAN)	DNF	
–	Kit Klein (USA)	DNF	

=== Final ===
Place	Name	Time
1	Elizabeth Dubois (USA)	2:04.0
2	Hattie Donaldson (CAN)	
3	Dorothy Franey (USA)	
4	Lela Brooks-Potter (CAN)	
5	Geraldine Mackie (CAN)	
6	Jean Wilson (CAN)	
