= Speed skating at the 1932 Winter Olympics – Women's 500 metres =

Women's 500 metres speed skating at the III Olympic Winter Games
- Pictogram for speed skating
- Venue: James B. Sheffield Olympic Skating Rink
- Date: 8 February 1932
- Competitors: 10 from 2 nations
- Winning time: 58.0

The 500 metres speed skating event for women was part of the demonstration sport programme of the 1932 Winter Olympics. The competition was held on Monday, February 8, 1932.

Ten speed skaters from two nations competed.

Like all other speed skating events at this Olympics the competition was held in pack-style format, having all competitors skate at the same time.

== Podium ==
| 1st Place | 2nd Place | 3rd Place |
| Jean Wilson; Canada | Elizabeth Dubois; United States | Kit Klein; United States |

== Records ==
These were the standing world and Olympic records (in seconds) prior to the 1932 Winter Olympics.

| World record | 58.7(*) | (Austria) Liselotte Landbeck | Davos (SUI) | January 9, 1932 |
| Olympic record | | - | | |

(*) The record was set in a high altitude venue (more than 1000 metres above sea level) and on naturally frozen ice.

Dorothy Franey skated the 500 metres in 54.8 seconds at the National Women's Championships at Oconomowoc, but in pack-style format.

== Results ==
=== First round ===
Heat 1

| Place | Name | Time | Qual. |
|---|---|---|---|
| 1 | Lela Brooks-Potter (CAN) | 62.4 | Q |
| 2 | Elsie Muller-McLave (USA) | | Q |
| 3 | Helen Bina (USA) | | Q |
| 4 | Hattie Donaldson (CAN) | | |
| 5 | Geraldine Mackie (CAN) | | |

Heat 2

| Place | Name | Time | Qual. |
|---|---|---|---|
| 1 | Jean Wilson (CAN) | 60.4 | Q |
| 2 | Kit Klein (USA) | | Q |
| 3 | Elizabeth Dubois (USA) | | Q |
| 4 | Dorothy Franey (USA) | | |
| 5 | Florence Hurd (CAN) | | |

=== Final ===
| Place | Name | Time |
|---|---|---|
| 1 | Jean Wilson (CAN) | 58.0 |
| 2 | Elizabeth Dubois (USA) | |
| 3 | Kit Klein (USA) | |
| 4 | Lela Brooks-Potter (CAN) | |
| 5 | Elsie Muller-McLave (USA) | |
| 6 | Helen Bina (USA) | |
