= Gryaznov =

Gryaznov (Russian: Грязнов, from грязь meaning mud) or Griaznov is a Russian masculine surname; its feminine counterpart is Gryaznova or Griaznova. Notable people with the surname include:

- Alla Gryaznova (born 1937), Russian economist
- George Gryaznov (1934–2011), Russian Orthodox archbishop
- Kirill Gryaznov (born 1983 or 1984), Russian chef suspected of espionage
- Vadim Gryaznov (born 1986), Russian football player
- Vasiliy Griaznov (c. 1840–1909), Belarusian painter, art teacher and historian
- Vyacheslav Gryaznov (born 1982), Russian classical pianist, transcriber and composer
