= Michel Gratton =

Michel Gratton may refer to:

- Michel Gratton (journalist) (1952–2011), press secretary to former Canadian prime minister Brian Mulroney
- Michel Gratton (politician) (1939–2025), member of the National Assembly of Quebec
