= Florence Hurd =

Canadian speed skater

Personal information
- Born: 6 May 1913 North Sydney, Nova Scotia, Canada
- Died: May 1988 (aged 74–75) Copper Cliff, Ontario, Canada

Sport
- Country: Canada
- Sport: Speed skating

Florence Hurd (6 May 1913 – May 1988) was a Canadian speed skater. She lived in or near Copper Cliff, Ontario, Canada.

She competed in all the three women's speed skating events at the 1932 Winter Olympics in Lake Placid, United States, which were held as demonstration sport. She competed in the 500 metres event, 1000 metres event and 1500 metres event but was eliminated in the heats.

In 1935, she was the North American Indoor Champion.

Hurd stated on 8 January 1936 that she will not compete at the 1936 World Allround Speed Skating Championships for women in Oslo, Norway; the first official World Allround Speed Skating Championships for Women.

After the Stanley Stadium in Copper Cliff was built, the region's first artificial ice surface, Hurd moved to the region together with her brother to train there.

== Personal life ==
She had a brother, Alex Hurd, who was also a speed skater. Several family members living in Eastern Ontario, Ottawa, and Niagara Falls, are described in a 1948 local newspaper.
