= Reinaldo Pünder =

Roman Catholic Bishop

Reinaldo Ernst Heribert Pünder
- Bishop of Coroatá
- Native name: Reinhard Ernst Heribert Pünder
- Church: Catholic Church
- Diocese: Diocese of Coroatá
- In office: 5 May 1978 – 16 January 2011
- Predecessor: Diocese erected
- Successor: Sebastião Bandeira Coelho

Orders
- Ordination: 10 October 1964 by Julius August Döpfner
- Consecration: 29 July 1978 by Acácio Rodrigues Alves

Personal details
- Born: 12 January 1939 Berlin, Gau Berlin, German Reich
- Died: 16 January 2011 (aged 72)

Reinaldo Ernst E. (Heribert) Pünder (12 January 1939 – 16 January 2011) was the Roman Catholic bishop of the Roman Catholic Diocese of Coroatá, Brazil.

Born in Germany, Pünder was ordained to the priesthood in 1964. In 1978, he was appointed bishop to the Coroatá Diocese, dying in office.
