= Kit Klein =

American speed skater (1910–1985)

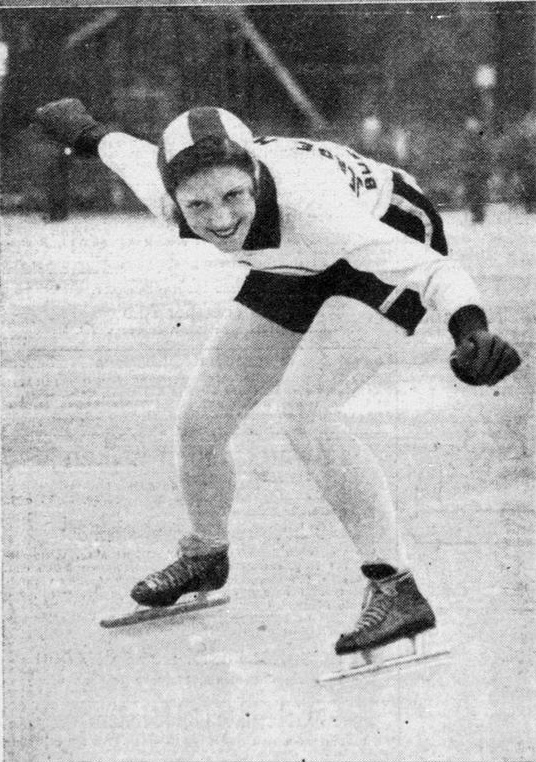
- Klein in 1933

Personal information
- Nationality: American
- Born: Catherine Klein; March 28, 1910 Buffalo, New York
- Died: April 13, 1985 (aged 75) Holmes Beach, Florida
- Spouse: Dr. Thomas "Tom" Outland

Sport
- Sport: Speed skating
- Events: 1500m and 500m

Achievements and titles
- Olympic finals: 1932 (Gold 1500m, Bronze 500 m)
- World finals: Gold 1936, Bronze 1935
- Personal bests: 500 m 49.8 1000 m 1:42.3; 1500 m 2:47.4; 3000 m 6:12.0 5000 m 10:18.0

Catherine "Kit" Klein-Outland (March 28, 1910 – April 13, 1985) was an American speed skater.

== Short biography ==
Kit Klein was born in Buffalo, New York and started competing on the local level. Later, Klein finished first in the 1500 metres event and third in the 500 metres competition at the 1932 Winter Olympics of Lake Placid, where speed skating for women was a demonstration sport. She also participated in the 1000 metres event but was eliminated in the heats.

She also won the 1,000 m race, as well as the overall bronze medal, at the Unofficial World Allround Championships in Oslo, Norway in 1935. At the 1936 first official World Allround Speed Skating Championships for Women in Stockholm, Sweden, Klein won gold.

After the 1936 Winter Olympics, Klein toured Europe before sailing home. During the voyage home Klein actually threw her skates overboard to mark her retirement from competitive skating. Towards the end 1936, she married Dr. Thomas "Tom" Outland of Sayre, Pennsylvania and the couple settled down in Harrisburg, Pennsylvania. For a while, Klein toured around North America with the Ice Follies skating show. After her husband's retirement in 1967, they moved to Holmes Beach, Florida, where Catherine "Kit" Klein-Outland died in 1985 at the age of 75.

Klein-Outland was inducted in the National Speedskating Hall of Fame in 1964, and posthumously in both the International Women's Sports Hall of Fame and the Greater Buffalo Sports Hall of Fame in 1993.

== Medals ==
An overview of medals won by Klein at important championships she participated in, listing the years in which she won each. Note that the World Allround Championships of 1935 were unofficial. Also note that speed skating for women was a demonstration sport at the 1932 Winter Olympics of Lake Placid. The medals related to these unofficial and demonstration events are in italics.

Championships	Gold medal	Silver medal	Bronze medal
Winter Olympics	1932 (1500 m)	–	1932 (500 m)
World Allround	1936	–	1935

Klein's championship wins included:

- 1930 Buffalo City Championships
- 1931 Buffalo City Championships
- 1933 National Championships, held in Oconomowoc, Wisconsin
- 1933 North American Championships
- 1934 National Championships, held in Oconomowoc, Wisconsin
- 1934 North American Indoor Championships, held in Toronto, Ontario, Canada (the Jean Wilson Memorial Trophy)
- 1935 National Indoor Championships, held in St. Louis, Missouri
- 1935 National Outdoor Championships, held in Oconomowoc, Wisconsin

During the 1932 Winter Olympics, one of Klein's toughest opponents was Canadian skater Jean Wilson, who took gold on the 500 m and silver on the 1500 m. The following year, Wilson died from a progressive muscular disease at 23. The Jean Wilson Memorial Trophy was created in her honor.

== World records ==
Over the course of her career, Klein skated two world records:

Event	Result	Date	Venue
1000 m	1:42.3	1 March 1935	Kongsberg
3000 m	6:12.0	1 February 1936	Stockholm

== Personal records ==
To put these personal records in perspective, the WR column lists the official world records on the dates that Klein skated her personal records.

Event	Result	Date	Venue	WR
500 m	49.8	1 March 1935	Kongsberg	49.3
1000 m	1:42.3	1 March 1935	Kongsberg	1:45.7
1500 m	2:47.4	19 January 1936	Oslo	2:40.0
3000 m	6:12.0	1 February 1936	Stockholm	6:22.4
5000 m	10:18.0	2 February 1936	Stockholm	10:54.8

Note that Klein's personal record on the 5000 m was not a world record because Verné Lesche skated 10:15.3 at the same tournament.
