= LaSalle Heights disaster =

Gas Explosion

LaSalle Heights Disaster
- Date: March 1, 1965
- Time: 8:05 am
- Location: LaSalle, Quebec, Canada; 45°25′58″N 73°39′17″W
- Cause: Gas explosion caused by cracked pipe
- Deaths: 28
- Injuries: 39

The LaSalle Heights disaster occurred in the early morning of March 1, 1965, in the city of LaSalle, Quebec when a gas line explosion destroyed a number of low-cost housing units. In all, 28 people were killed, 39 were injured and 200 left homeless. Most of the casualties were women and children.

== LaSalle Heights ==
LaSalle Heights is a suburban residential block of low-income rental units located at the corner of rue Bergevin and rue Jean Milot in LaSalle, Quebec, on the Island of Montreal. It was constructed by LaSalle Heights Inc. in 1955 and 1956 at a cost of $5,300,000. In 1955 construction was announced and the site was expected to consist of 678 units (54 three-bedroom houses in rows, 422 three-bedroom apartments, 136 two-bedroom apartments, 50 one-bedroom apartments, and 16 bachelor apartments). Rents ranged from $30 a month to $57 a month and were available to families whose monthly income ranged between four and six times their rent. The block consisted of 25 identical U-shaped buildings, each housing 36 units of various sizes.

== Explosion ==
At approximately 8:05 am a six-inch (150 mm) fissure emerged in a natural gas supply line in the cellar of 367 rue Bergevin, destroying units in it along with those in buildings 365, 363 and 361. Approximately 36 units were affected. The explosion left a 20-foot-deep (6.1 m) crater where the three-story apartment building had stood. During subsequent inquiries on the incident, metallurgists André Hone and William Williams concluded that a cracked pipe, most likely damaged during transportation or installation, was the cause of the explosion.

== Casualties ==
At 10 pm on the evening of the explosion, Coroner Marcel Trahan released some names of the known dead. On March 3 a more complete list was released. At the time, four people were still missing and one deceased victim was unidentified.

=== Deaths ===
==== 0365 rue Bergevin ====
- Nancy McGuigan (née Margret Nancy Green) (age 31) and her children Gordon (age 12), Caroline (age 10), and Warren (age 13 months)
- Vera Peard (née Veronica Marion Costello) (age 39) and her children Kevin (age 2), Dianne (age 6), and Sharon (age 9)
- Mary Czopko and her daughters Brenda (age 5) and Johanne (age 7)
- James Dyer (age 35), a roomer with the Czopko family
- Jean Marc Thibeault (age 44) and Mrs. Jean Marc Thibeault (age 51)
- Louis Bischoff (age 44)

==== 0367 rue Bergevin ====
- Donna, Vera, and Anne-Marie Rehanek (age 8, 5, and 2 respectively)
- Emma Arsineau (age 50)
- Marielle Quesnel (age 33)
- Mrs. John Chalmers and her daughter Debra-Ann (age 3)

==== Other addresses ====
- Sandra Dawson (age 3), granddaughter of Emma Arsineau
- Marc Anthony Fernando (3 months old)
- Sheila Jones (age 1)
- Gail Sylvia (age 16)
- Heather Sylvia (age 10)
- Donna Sylvia (age 4)

=== Injured ===
- Danny Silver (age 8) - nose fracture, cuts
- Sharon Silver (age 10) - leg fracture, cuts
- Diane Silver (age 3) - under observation
- Laura Silver (age 4) - contusions
- Louis Lajoie (age 8) - contusions
- Mary Czopko (age 32) - broken back (mistakenly declared dead on day of blast. Died on March 26, 1965)
- Norman Czopko (9 months) - legs fractured, contusions
- Gary Czopko - contusions
- Leean Jones (age 2) - contusions
- Susan Peard (age 13) - multiple fractures and contusions
- Mrs. James Ilacqua - cuts and contusions
- Mrs. James Dawes - contusions
- Albert Rehanek - burns and contusions
- Selma Ryce Rehanek - burns and cuts
- Antonio Ciarlo - contusions, burns, serious condition
- Helmute Wiet - multiple fractures, burns
- Wayne McGuigan (son of Nancy, age 3) had to break leg to get out of stairwell

An additional 23 injured people were named in the March 3, 1965 Gazette but no additional details were provided. Andrew Silver - broken legs, broken arm, partially fractured skull

== Response ==
By 8:25 am the LaSalle fire department, along with a number of naval officers from a nearby barracks descended on the site. By the afternoon, premier Jean Lesage and multiple deputies and ministers arrived to assess the damage. In the days following a foundation was created for the victims and a radio and television telethon took place. Approximately $600,000 was raised in the effort.

Queen Elizabeth letter's stated: "I am most deeply distressed to learn of the tragic accident which has taken place in Ville LaSalle. Please convey my sincere sympathy to the mayor, to the injured, and the next-of-kin of those who have lost their lives. Elizabeth R." - March 3, 1965

The Central Mortgage and Housing Corporation along with the minister in charge of the Canadian government's housing program made approximately 60 vacant house available for the more than 200 left homeless from the disaster. Rent was provided free for two months.

In November of that year Herbert Peard launched a lawsuit against Quebec Natural Gas Corporation. Peard's wife of 15 years and his three children were among those who died. The $85,000 lawsuit included a claim of $21,000 on behalf of his only remaining child Susan, who was seriously injured in the blast.

On March 29, 1965, LaSalle Heights Inc. announced any or all tenants of the LaSalle Heights Housing Development were allowed to break their lease if they wanted.

In February 1967, LaSalle Heights Inc. filed a $853,275 lawsuit against Quebec Natural Gas Corporation.

== 50th anniversary commemoration ==
The Borough of LaSalle organized a number of activities in 2015 to honour the victims' memory:

- All LaSalle churches were invited to commemorate the event as part of their Sunday service on March 1, marking the exact date of the 50th anniversary.
- A resolution was adopted and a minute of silence observed during the Borough Council meeting on March 2, the day after the anniversary of the disaster.
- The Borough granted financial assistance of $3,000 to the Société historique Cavelier-de-LaSalle, to write a monograph on the LaSalle Heights Disaster.
- The Borough organized an exhibition on the tragedy, including photos from archives and newspaper articles.
- A public square at Boulevard LaSalle and Rue Lyette, near the borough hall, was named Place du 1er-Mars-1965 after the date of the explosion, and a commemorative stela was erected as a memorial to this explosion and to another one that had occurred in the same neighbourhood on 28 August 1956.
