= Vadim Gryaznov =

Russian footballer

Personal information
- Full name: Vadim Viktorovich Gryaznov
- Date of birth: 13 March 1986 (age 40)
- Place of birth: Prague, Czechoslovakia
- Height: 1.80 m (5 ft 11 in)
- Positions: Defender; midfielder

Senior career*
Years	Team	Apps	(Gls)
2004	FC Tekstilshchik-2 Ivanovo		
2005–2007	FC Tekstilshchik-Telekom Ivanovo	72	(4)
2008	FC Sheksna Cherepovets	1	(0)
2008	FC Krasnaya Talka Ivanovo		
2009	FC Spartak Kostroma	21	(0)
2010–2012	FC Tekstilshchik Ivanovo	48	(1)
2012–2013	FC Kooperator Vichuga		
2014	FC Yuzha		
2016	FC Vichuga		
2017	FC Rubin Yalta		
2018	FC Kyzyltash Bakhchisaray		
- * Club domestic league appearances and goals

Vadim Viktorovich Gryaznov (Russian: Вадим Викторович Грязнов; born 13 March 1986) is a Russian former professional football player.

== Club career ==
He played in the Russian Football National League for FC Tekstilshchik-Telekom Ivanovo in 2007.
