= Irving Farmer Kennedy =

Canadian military aviator (1922–2011)

Irving Farmer Kennedy DFC & Bar
- Born: 4 February 1922; Cumberland, Ontario
- Died: 6 January 2011 (aged 88); Cumberland, Ontario
- Military career
- Allegiance: Canada
- Branch: Royal Canadian Air Force
- Service years: 1940 – 1945
- Nickname: 'Hap'
- Conflicts: World War II
- Awards: Distinguished Flying Cross and Bar

Irving Farmer 'Hap' Kennedy DFC & Bar (4 February 1922 – 6 January 2011) was a Canadian fighter pilot in the Royal Canadian Air Force (RCAF) during the Second World War. He was one of Canada's highest-scoring aces of the war, with 10 solo and 5 shared aircraft destroyed, and 1 probably destroyed.

== Biography ==
Born in Cumberland, Ontario in 1922 to Eva Farmer and Robert James Kennedy (a veteran of World War I, injured in 1917 at Vimy Ridge). The war started when he was 17 in his final year of high school in Ottawa, and he joined the RCAF in October 1940.

== Service career ==
He did his flight training in Canada at No.2 Initial Training School (ITS) in early 1941, and No.8 Elementary Flying Training School (EFTS) and No.10 Service Flying Training School (SFTS) to July 1941. As a Sergeant Pilot he was posted overseas to the UK in August 1941, flying Hawker Hurricane fighters at No.55 Operational Training Unit (OTU).

In September 1941 he was posted to No. 263 Squadron RAF, flying the Westland Whirlwind, based in the West Country and flying convoy protection and ground attack sorties into France. He was promoted to Flight Sergeant in January 1942 and commissioned as a Flight Lieutenant in March 1942. In June 1942 he was posted to the newly formed No. 421 Squadron RCAF flying the Spitfire Mk.V.

He then shipped out to Malta to join No. 249 Squadron RAF in October 1942, where he became an ace with seven confirmed victories. His first aerial victory came in February 1943 when he and another pilot downed a Junkers Ju 52 transport near Licata. He was awarded a quarter victory in shooting down a Junkers Ju 88 of KG 54 on 3 March 1943, a half victory on 22 March 1943 and a third on 16 April. In April he and American ace Squadron Leader J.J. Lynch caught and destroyed three Ju 52 transports off Sicily, and awarded two victories. Over Sicily and Italy he claimed five more victories, including a Focke-Wulf Fw 190 of SKG 10 on both 4 and 10 September and two Messerschmitt Bf 109Gs of JG 77 on 13 October.

In June he was posted to No. 185 Squadron RAF, flying a mixture of Spitfire Vs and IXs. On June 22 he was awarded the Distinguished Flying Cross. Although tour-expired in July 1943, Kennedy stayed on operations, this time with No. 111 Squadron RAF until September 1943. A spell with No. 93 Squadron RAF followed until December 1943.

He then returned to the UK and began another tour on 15 June 1944 as Commanding Officer with No. 401 Squadron RAF. Kennedy downed two more German fighters for a total of 14 enemy aircraft destroyed, before he was shot down by flak on 26 July 1944. After parachuting into a field in occupied France, he initially hid in a hayloft and was cared for by a French family. With the aid of the French Maquis, Kennedy walked to Allied lines.

He returned to Canada in September 1944, and was released from the RCAF on 13 February 1945. He became a doctor and studied medicine at the University of Toronto, graduating in 1950. He was based in Cumberland, Ontario. Kennedy died on 6 January 2011.

Kennedy's brothers, Robert and Carleton, also served. Carleton died when his Halifax Mk III bomber crashed.

== Decorations and Medals ==
- DFC and Bar
- Awarded French Legion of Honour in 2004
