= Igor Birman =

Russian-American economist

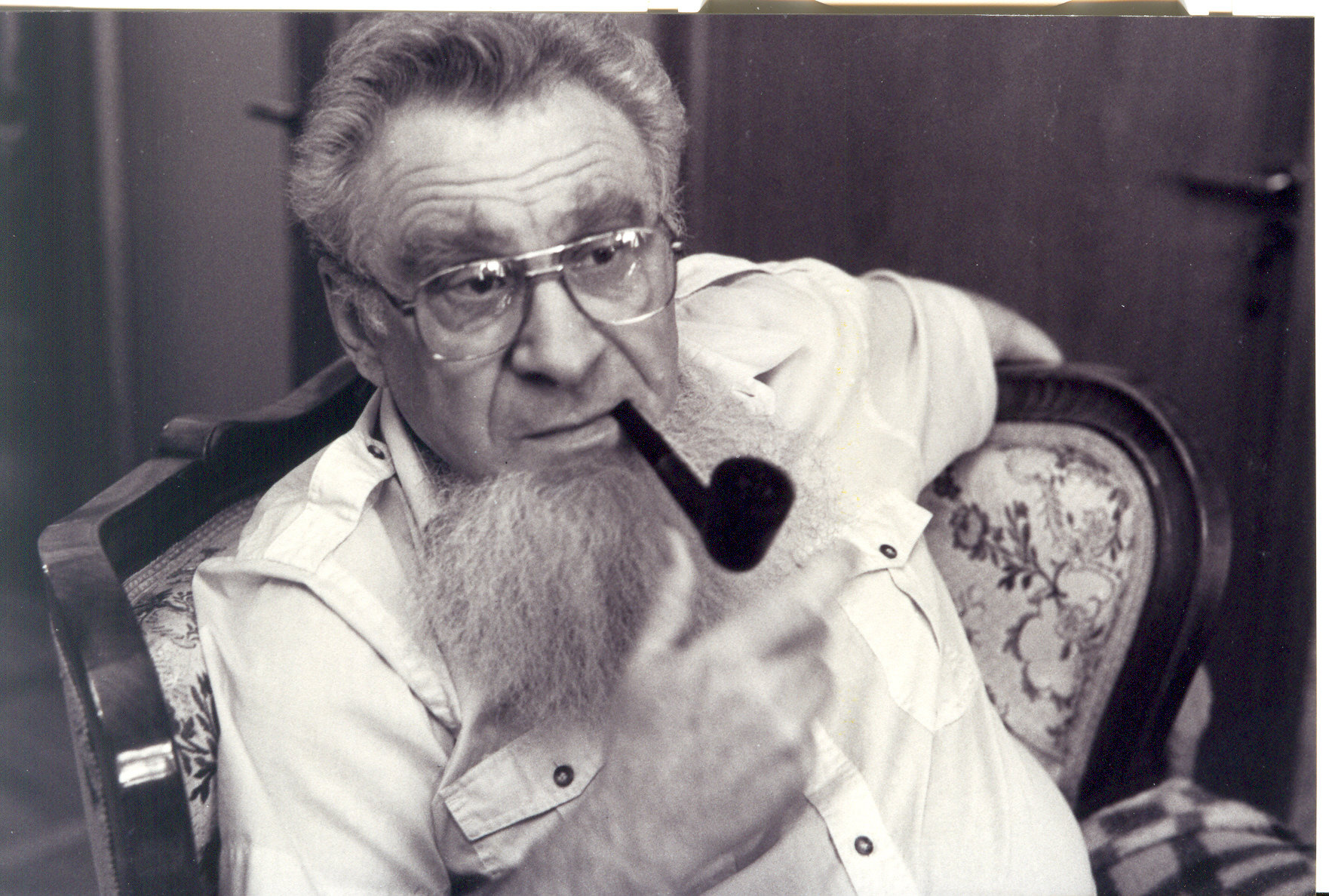

Igor Yakovlevich Birman (July 25, 1928 – April 6, 2011) was a Russian-American economist. He received his Ph.D. in 1960. He authored a number of books translated into four languages and some 200 articles in professional periodicals and also in the popular press (Izvestia, Literaturnaya gazeta, Wall Street Journal, Washington Post).

== Biography ==
Birman was born in Moscow in 1928. He graduated from the Statistical Institute in 1949, and earned a Ph.D. in economics (кандидат экономических наук)in 1960. He was Director of Planning in three factories, worked in scientific institutes, and was a member of the commission on economic reform (1965).

In 1974 Birman emigrated to the United States, where was employed chiefly as a consultant on the Soviet economy for The Pentagon and taught at two universities. He argued against economic estimates made by the CIA and Sovietologists, particularly, the size of the economy, comparative level of living, share and size of military expenditures, deficit of the state budget, etc. Together with Valery Chalidze he edited the magazine «Russia».

Birman is best known for having criticized U.S. economists specializing in the Soviet Union (sovietologists) and CIA analysts for misunderstanding Soviet reality. Birman argued that the CIA overestimated the size of the Soviet economy and that the Soviets were spending as much as 30% of their GNP on the military. In an article in the Washington Post published On October 27, 1980, he said that the Soviet economy was in a state of crisis. According to one analyst, "Outside critics had often attacked the CIAʼs operational side but never its analysis, and certainly not from the political Right. …… In 1986, the CIAʼs analysts insisted that the Soviet economy was about to expand… Three years later, the Soviet Union collapsed." With the opening up of the Soviet Union and its records, Birman's assertions were supported by Soviet economists themselves.

Though his predictions turned out to be correct, American academics were skeptical of his assertions, and his work was not published in the major journals. Birman was criticized for not relying on Western economic theory and mathematical models in conducting his analyses of the Soviet economy. Instead, he advocated for including data from what he called "anecdotal economics," relying in part on his visceral understanding of the Soviet Union, lived experience, simple logic, and intuition that could not be quantified or modeled.

Igor Birman died on April 6, 2011, at his home in Rockville, MD. He was survived by his wife of 53 years Albina Tretyakova Birman; his children Julia Shildkret (George), Dina Birman (Ed Trickett), and Igor Birman (Elysa); and grandchildren Mark Shildkret, Michelle Keinan, Nicholas Trickett, Alexander Trickett, Ashley Birman, and Zoey Birman.

=== Books by Igor Birman ===
- Транспортная задача линейного программирования. М.: Экономиздат, 1959
- Оптимальное программирование, М.: Экономика, 1968 / нем. издание: Lineare Optimierung in der Okonomie. Berlin: Verlag Die Wirtschaft, 1971
- Методология оптимального планирования. М.: Мысль, 1971 /in Czech. Прага: 1974/
- Secret Incomes of the Soviet State Budget. The Hague; Boston : Martinus Nijhoff, 1981. ISBN 90-247-2550-X; 0908094086; 0908094000 (bibliography pp. 270–272)
- Экономика недостач. Нью-Йорк: Chalidze publications, 1983.
- To Build Anew (рус.: Строить заново). Benson, Vermont : Chalidze Publ., 1988 (in Russian)
- Personal Consumption in the USSR and USA. N.Y. : St. Martin Press, 1989. ISBN 0-312-02392-8 (Библиография: стр.191-251)
- Productivity of the Soviet Economy Before Perestroika. Dump Eurospan, 1991. ISBN 0-8447-3745-3
- Величина советских военных расходов: методический аспект. Стокгольм: : Inst., 1991
- Реформа экономики абсурда: к собственной собственности. М.: Пик, 1991
- Я — экономист (о себе любимом). Новосибирск: Экор, 1966; (2-е издание - М.: Время, 2001).
- Уровень русской жизни (а также американской) (The level of Russian living and American as well).М.:Научный мир, 2004 (2-е изд. — М.: Экономика, 2007), ISBN 5-89176-277-3,
- Капиталистический манифест (Capitalist manifesto). M.: 2010

and co-authored and edited several books, for example:

- Notes on input-output analysis in the USSR. (в соавт. с Альбиной Третьяковой) Durham, N. C., 1975
- Статистика уровня жизни населения России (в соавторстве с Л.Пияшевой). М.:1997;
- Математические методы и проблемы размещения производства (Mathematical methods and problems of production territorial allocation). М.: Изд-во эконом. лит-ры, 1963;
- Оптимальный план отрасли (Optimal Plan of a Branch) M.: Ekonomizdat, 1970; etc.

=== Selected articles ===
- Birman, Igor (1988). "The Imbalance of the Soviet Economy". Soviet Studies. 40 (2): 210–221. doi:10.1080/09668138808411750. JSTOR 151107.
- Birman, I. (1980; October 27). The Way to Slow the Arms Race. Washington Post, Op-Ed, P. A15
- Birman, Igor (1980). "Limits of Economic Measurements". Slavic Review. 39 (4): 603–607. doi:10.2307/2496500. JSTOR 2496500. S2CID 164049697.
- Birman, I. (1986). The Soviet Economy: Alternative Views, Russia, 12
- Birman, Igor (1991). "Le problème de l'evaluation de l'effort militaire soviétique, 1988-1990" (PDF). Revue d'études comparatives Est-Ouest. 22 (4): 5–20. doi:10.3406/receo.1991.1522. JSTOR 45351003.
- Birman, Igor (1996). "Gloomy Prospects for the Russian Economy". Europe-Asia Studies. 48 (5): 735–750. doi:10.1080/09668139608412378. JSTOR 152995.
- Birman, I (1998). "Назад в социалистическую экономику?". Экономика и математические методы (3): 157–164. ISSN 0424-7388.
- Аномальное полузнайство.- В: Свободная мысль. М.: 1997 сентябрь
- Письмо в редакцию (по поводу статьи Тремля и Кудрова). - В: Вопросы статитики. М.: 1998, No. 4.
- Уровень русской жизни (недопроизнесенный доклад). - В: Nota Bene, Иерусалим: 2006, No. 13.
- Избытчность - норма нормальной экономики. - В: Экономическая наука современной России. М.; 2007, No. 4.

=== Literature about Birman ===
- Shelley, Louise (1980). Igor Birman. American Jewish Committee, Oral History Library. OCLC 80122146.
- Wilhelm, John Howard (2003). "The Failure of the American Sovietological Economics Profession". Europe-Asia Studies. 55 (1): 59–74. doi:10.1080/713663450. JSTOR 826523. S2CID 154520676.
- Wilhelm, John Howard (1990). "Crisis and Collapse: What Are the Issues?". Soviet Studies. 42 (2): 317–327. doi:10.1080/09668139008411869. JSTOR 152083.
- Hopkins, Mark Myron; Kennedy, Michael (1984). Comparisons and implications of alternative views of the Soviet economy. Rand. ISBN 978-0-8330-0523-6. OCLC 793655562.
- Jones, Milo (2009). Constructing Cassandra: The social construction of strategic surprise at the Central Intelligence Agency 1947-2001 (Thesis). doi:10.22024/UniKent/01.02.86410.
