= Dorothy Franey =

American speed skater

Dorothy “Dot” Franey Langkop (October 25, 1913 in Saint. Paul, Minnesota – January 10, 2011 in Dallas, Texas) was an American speed skater who competed in the 1932 Winter Olympics.

== Biography ==
As she was from Saint Paul, like other skaters from downriver, she wore the colors of the Hippodrome Skating Club. While there was an ice rink on Lake Como in St. Paul, rode her best performances at the ice on Powderhorn Lake in Minneapolis. She was at her best by the 1930s.

In 1932, she competed in the women's speed skating events which were held as demonstration sport. She finished third in the 1000 metres event and fifth in the 1500 metres competition. She also participated in the 500 metres event but was eliminated in the heats.

According to her Dallas Morning News obituary, Franey won national speed skating championships four years running from 1933 to 1936.

Franey won a major speed skating competition at Powderhorn Lake in 1936. A Minneapolis Star columnist wrote facetiously that she was “mad at herself” because she broke only one national record that weekend.

Franey turned professional in 1938, so she could earn money from exhibitions, endorsements and appearing in figure skating shows (there was no professional speed skating circuit). She had endorsement of Camel cigarettes, which appeared in newspaper “funnies” around the country. She headlined her own ice revue for 14 years at the famed Adolphus Hotel in Dallas. In 2002, she carried the Olympic torch to City Hall in Dallas at age 89. She died of natural causes at University of Texas Southwestern Medical Center in 2011.
