= John Barnes (Australian cricketer) =

Australian cricketer (1916–2011)

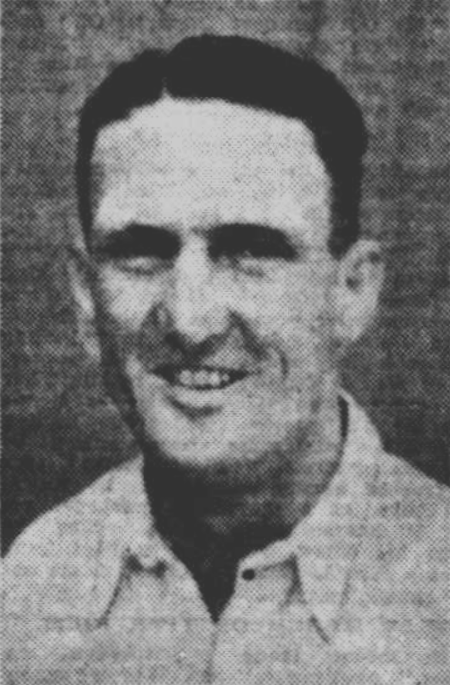

Personal information
- Born: 27 September 1916; Rockhampton, Queensland, Australia
- Died: 19 January 2011 (aged 94); Tugun, Queensland, Australia
- Source: Cricinfo, 1 October 2020

John Barnes (27 September 1916 – 19 January 2011) was an Australian cricketer who was a wicket-keeper batsman. He played in one first-class match for Queensland in 1941. He also played representative rugby league as a full-back.

== Cricket career ==
Barnes played in Rockhampton grade cricket in the 1930s, representing Mount Pleasant from at least 1933. In 1934 he was selected to play in the Country Week cricket carnival, representing a combined Rockhampton Second XI. Mount Pleasant played in the lower Grades of Rockhampton cricket, and it was noted that Barnes was the most successful lower grade batsman selected and "a very free batsman" who "did good work behind the stumps" and was likely to be recruited by a Rockhampton A Grade side.

In the 1934-35 season Barnes moved to the Wandals Cricket Club. In February 1936 a Rockhampton match report noted he "... had the makings of a very fine batsman if he will only restrain his tendency to try to make spectacular shots before he has settled down." In late 1936 the Rockhampton Cricket Association commended Barnes for a century he scored against a combined South Queensland side, whose bowling attack included Eddie Gilbert, and suggested he should be considered for State selection. The Rockhampton Morning Bulletin harshly criticized the Queensland Cricket Association for not mentioning Barnes century in its annual report for the season.

Barnes scored 456 runs at an average of 30 for Wandals in the 1936-37 season, improving on his aggregate of 324 at 20 for 1935-36, and a Rockhampton paper described him as a "consistent and accomplished batsman." In 1937 Barnes captained Wandals for a match, standing in for the club captain Leo McMahon, and McMahon stood down from the captaincy for the 1938-39 season to allow Barnes to take the position. He performed well at a country cricket carnival in Brisbane in 1938, he had not expected to keep wicket during the carnival and when he was required to do so Don Tallon, the State keeper, lent him his pair of gloves and gave him some advice. His performance earnt him selection as twelfth man for the Queensland Colts, and he received an offer to play for the Brisbane Colts team however he had to find employment to support the move and was unable to do so. In 1941 Barnes performed well in a country cricket carnival again, and in January it was reported that he was one of three country players being seriously considered for State honors by the selectors, and he was selected to represent Queensland against Victoria in Brisbane in January as a batsman, however he did not score well in either innings.

Barnes' cricket career was interrupted by World War II and he served in the Army in Port Moresby and Bougainville in Papua New Guinea. In 1945 he was released from military service and kept wicket for Wandals in his first week back in Rockhampton taking one run out, three stumpings, and four catches in his first game. He played for a combined Rockhampton XI which won the Harrup Cup in 1947. In 1948 a Queensland Cricket Association Country selector said the following regarding Barnes, "Batsmen could improve a lot if they studied Jack Barnes' style. I consider him to be one of the best stroke makers in Central Queensland and if arrangements could be made whereby he could coach players on a good practice wicket the standard would rise rapidly."

== See also ==
- List of Queensland first-class cricketers
