= Solange Bertrand =

French painter, sculptor and engraver

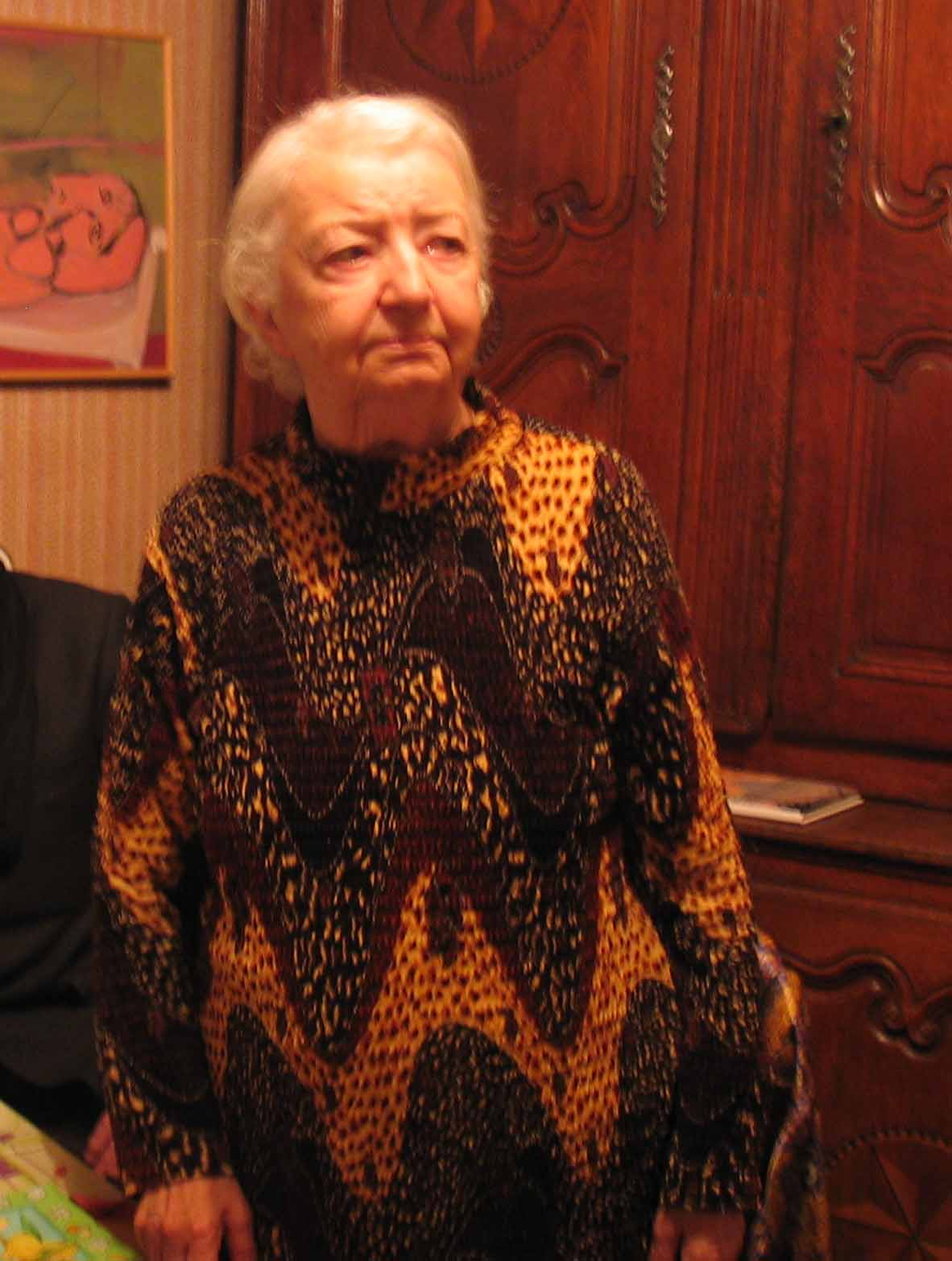
- Born: 20 March 1913; Montigny-lès-Metz, France
- Died: 22 January 2011 (aged 97); Montigny-lès-Metz, France
- Occupations: Painter, sculptor and engraver

Solange Bertrand (20 March 1913 – 22 January 2011) was a French painter, sculptor, and engraver.

== Early life and education ==
Born in Montigny-lès-Metz, Bertrand studied art for four years to the École des Beaux-Arts in Nancy, and then attended the Beaux–Arts in Paris. During the Second World War she was registered as a volunteer nurse, and was successively assigned to different posts (army, youth camps, children retreated from bombed areas, repatriation of deportees and prisoners).

== Art career ==
At the beginning of her career, Bertrand painted in an expressionist way, but, later evolved into what can be described as relative abstraction. Bertrand during her long career mixed all manners of painting, jumbling styles and periods and paying only a little attention to dates. In the immediate post war period, she organized exhibitions regularly (Salon d'Automne, Salon de Mai, Comparaison, Salon Women Painters and Sculptors). Her first solo exhibition was organized at the Paris's Galerie Pascaud in 1947. For the artist many other single person exhibitions followed, mostly in Paris and Metz, but also in the other French departments and abroad (i.e. Belgium, Germany, Netherlands, Italy, etc...). Bertrand gained several honours, including gaining the title of Master Academician in 1985. In May 2005, a sale of 108 of her works achieved success at the Hôtel Drouot.

Her work is today in public collections (Museums of Metz, Nancy, Picasso Museum in Antibes, Chéret Museum in Nice, etc...), as well as many private collections. Bertrand died on 22 January 2011 at the age of 97.

== Solange Bertrand foundation ==
In 2001, Lionel Jospin, then Prime Minister of France, recognized by decree as a public interest the creation of the Solange Bertrand Foundation, preserving and exhibiting artworks of the artist. Bertrand donated to the foundation 303 paintings, 700 drawings, and 49 sculptures, which represent the evolution of her art production throughout her career.
