= Marina Abroskina =

Russian/Mexican basketball player

Personal information
- Born: 21 March 1967 Volgograd, Soviet Union
- Died: 17 January 2011 (aged 43) Mexico
- Listed height: 1.83 m (6 ft 0 in)

Career information
- Playing career: 1984–2004
- Position: Power forward

Career history
- 1984-1990: Dynamo Volgograd
- 1990-1999: Mexico
- 1999-2000: Spartak Noginsk
- 2001-2002: Nadežda Volgograd
- 2002-2004: Switzerland

Career highlights
- International Master of Sports of the USSR (1989)
Medals
Women's Basketball
Gold medal – first place	1989 Bulgaria	Team

Marina Nikolaevna Abroskina de García (Russian: Марина Николаевна Аброськина де Гарсия; 21 March 1967 — 17 January 2011) was a Russian female professional basketball player. She was also Mexican citizen.

Abroskina died on January 17, 2011, from the effects of a brain tumor.

== Honours ==
- European Championship U16 (USSR):
  - Gold: 1984
- European Championship (USSR):
  - Gold: 1989
- Central America Championship (Mexico):
  - Gold: 1991
- Soviet Women's Basketball Championship (Dynamo Volgograd):
  - Bronze: 1989, 1990
