= Vitaly Vulf =

Russian art and literary critic (1930–2011)

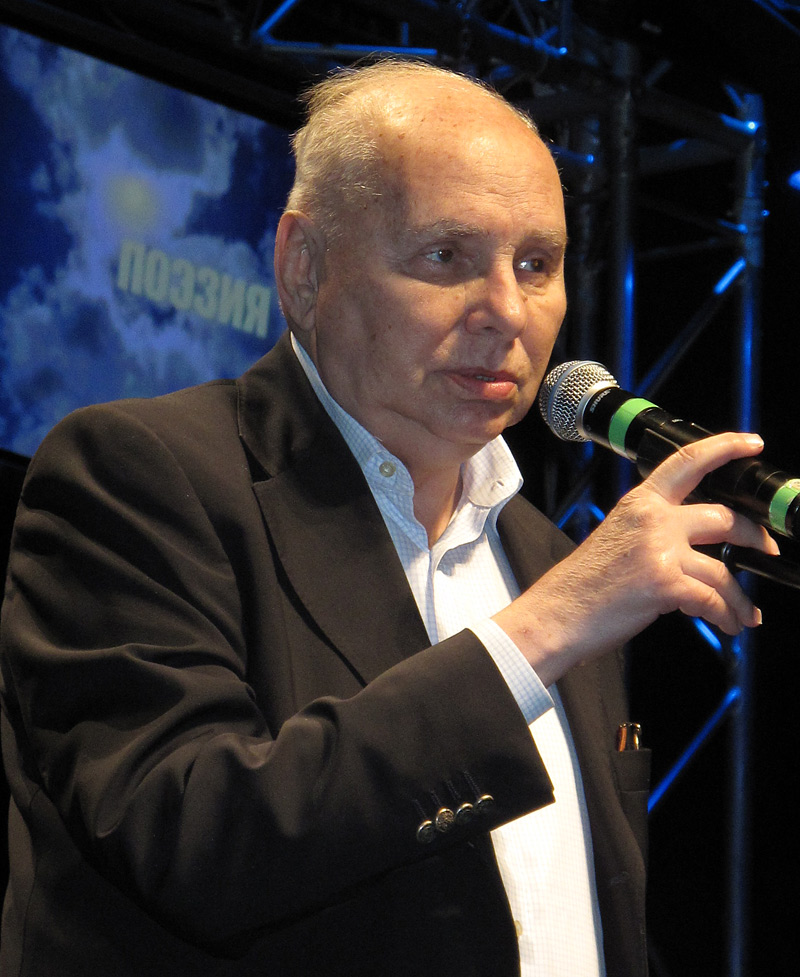
Vitaly Vulf

Vitaly Yakovlevich Vulf (Russian: Вита́лий Я́ковлевич Вульф, 23 May 1930 – 13 March 2011) was a Russian art, drama, film critic, literary critic, translator, TV and radio broadcaster.

== Biography ==
Vitaly Vulf was born in Baku, where his father Yakov (who died in January 1956) was a lawyer. Vulf's mother, Helen Yelena Belenkaya, graduated from Baku University and was a teacher of Russian language. She died in 1974.

Vitaly Yakovlevich dreamed of going to GITIS. However, his father insisted that he received a serious education. So after graduating from high school Vitaly Vulf enrolled at the Moscow State University law school. However, owing to Antisemitism, Vitaly Vulf could not obtained a position as a lawyer. For the same reason he failed to obtain admission to the graduate school, in spite of getting straight A's on the admission exams in 1955.

== Death ==
Vulf died of prostate cancer in Moscow on March 13, 2011 at the age of 80.
