= Matti Mattson =

American activist (1916–2011)

Matti August Mattson
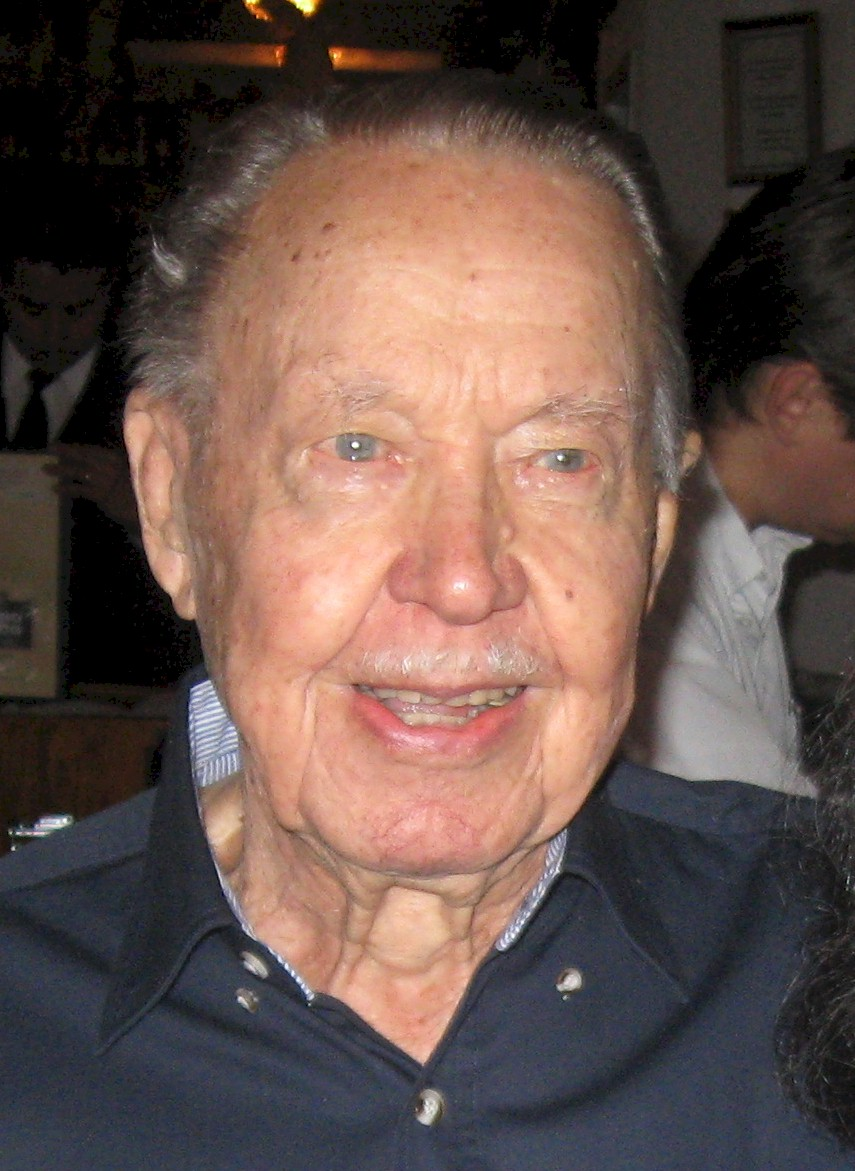
- Mattson in Manhattan, September 6, 2009
- Born: September 17, 1916; Fitchburg, Massachusetts
- Died: January 11, 2011 (aged 94)
- Known for: Lincoln Battalion

Matti August Mattson (September 17, 1916 – January 11, 2011) was an American labor organizer, social activist, and Veteran of the Abraham Lincoln Brigade in the Spanish Civil War.

== Background ==
Mattson was born in Fitchburg, Massachusetts of Finnish ancestry. He completed one year of high school and then studied at the B.F. Brown Junior High School, where he took an elective course in printing. He then worked as a blacksmith's helper at a granite quarry on top of Rollstone Hill in Fitchburg, where a massive glacial boulder stood (it is now on the small triangle on the Upper Common). He lived on Mount Elam Road.

During the Great Depression, he joined the Young Communist League (YCL), the youth organization of the Communist Party USA. He was active in demonstrating, and among other things walked in a "Hunger March" to Boston. The slogans were Feed the Needy, Enact Unemployment Insurance and establish a system of Social Security.

== Spanish Civil War ==
Strongly opposed to Fascism, Mattson was one of four Fitchburg volunteers who went to Spain in a clandestine manner to help the Spanish people defend the legally elected Spanish Republic against the Spanish generals' betrayal, aided by their backers Hitler and Mussolini. He sailed for Spain on the SS Washington.

Once in France, he boarded a small wine-transporting boat that the small businessman risked losing (along with his life) in the Mediterranean port of Sète, about 100 miles from the frontier with Spain. He told the New York Times: "We got on at night when no one was looking — we hoped." He and others reached Spain in March 1937.

In Spain, he was in infantry training for about two weeks and was then assigned to the XIII Brigade Intendencia as a truck driver on the Southern Front. After Brunete, Mattson transferred to the XV Brigade as a front-line ambulance driver where he was with the Lincoln-Washington Battalion at all of its actions until the Ebro Crossing.

He returned to the United States in December, 1938.

About his service as a volunteer in the Spanish Civil War, Mattson has said:

I now feel that the decision to volunteer was the most important single thing that I have done. We helped wake the world up to the danger of war, and allowed (the Allies) to prepare somewhat.

At a march and ceremony for the International Brigades before they left Spain, Mattson heard Dolores Ibárruri, "La Pasionaria", speak. In 2008, Mattson said:

I heard her when we left Spain in 1938. We marched down the Diagonal in Barcelona, then we had a meeting at the end there and she spoke." He said that she was braver than either one of them (John McCain and Barack Obama).

== World War II ==
During World War II, Mattson joined the U.S. Army and was trained as a pilot in the Army Air Corps. He graduated with his class but was not permitted to fly because of his political activities. He was ordered to the Army Corps of Engineers and served in the European Theater. Later he was sent to the Pacific as part of the army of occupation in Japan after the close of hostilities. He attained the rank of Staff Sergeant.

== Later life ==
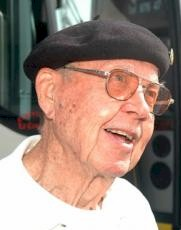
Mattson in 2010

Mattson worked as a printer in New York until his retirement. He was an activist in Local 6 of the Printers Union.

Mattson was a member of Veterans for Peace, NYC Chapter 34. For many years he has marched the length of Fifth Avenue in the Veterans Day Parade and has spoken at the Vietnam Veterans Memorial in lower Manhattan on Memorial Day. He was often a speaker at the annual reunions of the Abraham Lincoln Brigade in New York City.

On March 30, 2008, Mattson was one of 11 veterans of the Lincoln Brigade present at the dedication of a monument to the Brigade on the Embarcadero in San Francisco, California.

On August 26, 2009, Mattson was made a citizen of Spain. According to The Volunteer of December 2009,

On August 26, 2009, Mattson became the third surviving Lincoln vet to take advantage of one of the key provisions of Spain's controversial "Law of Historical Memory," which allows veterans of the International Brigades to acquire Spanish citizenship without renouncing their other nationality.

The ceremony took place in the office of Fernando Villalonga, Spanish Consul General in New York. Mattson is quoted as saying:

I am going to accept this citizenship for not only the guys who are buried in Spain, there's a lot of them, but the guys that are buried in the United States.

On September 6, 2009, Mattson was guest of honor at a dinner organized by the Friends and Family of the Abraham Lincoln Brigade at the Centro Vasco Restaurant on West 23rd Street, New York City.

On January 29, 2010, Mattson was honored with the President's Medal by Fitchburg State College at its Commencement ceremonies. On this occasion he said:

I am and will still be a staunch anti-fascist and will oppose war to the same extent as before I went to Spain, and after I returned to my country. I know that my life has been somewhat different from some others during my time on Earth, but it has always been an honest effort, and has fulfilled the teaching that my immigrant parents gave me: 'Try to leave the Earth in better condition than you found it.'

== Death ==
In the summer of 2010 Mattson broke his femur and caught pneumonia. He moved to the JFK Hospital in Lake Worth, Florida, where he died on January 11, 2011.
