= Louise Raggio =

American lawyer (1919–2011)

- Born: Louise Hilma Ballerstedt; June 15, 1919; Austin, Texas, U.S.
- Died: January 23, 2011 (aged 91); Texas, U.S.
- Education: University of Texas at Austin (BA); Southern Methodist University (LLB)
- Occupations: Lawyer, prosecutor
- Years active: 1952–2000s
- Spouse: Grier Raggio (m. 1941)
- Children: 3 sons
- Awards: Margaret Brent Women Lawyers of Achievement Award (1995); Texas Trailblazer Award (1997)

Louise Raggio (June 15, 1919 – January 23, 2011) was a Texas lawyer for more than fifty years. She was the first female prosecutor in Dallas County, Texas. She spearheaded a coalition to establish the Marital Property Act of 1967 (which went into effect on January 1, 1968), and the Texas Family Code.

== Early life ==
Louise Hilma Ballerstedt was born on June 15, 1919 to first generation parents of Swedish and German descent. at her grandmother's home in Austin, Texas. She graduated as valedictorian from her high school in Austin and was the first in her family to go to college. She attended the University of Texas, where she earned her bachelor's degree summa cum laude in 1939. While in university, she also served as president of the Austin League of Women Voters and was a member of Phi Beta Kappa as well as a Rockefeller Foundation scholarship winner. She married Grier Raggio, who was then a government lawyer, in 1941. During her years of raising three sons she attended Southern Methodist University at night earning her law degree by 1952 where she was the only woman in her graduating class.

== Career ==
Louise Raggio found a job working as an assistant district attorney in Dallas County in 1954 and was put in charge of child support, delinquent fathers, juvenile court and family law. While working as a prosecutor, she learned that married women had fewer rights in Texas than single women, i.e. married women in Texas had limited property rights and couldn't take out bank loans or start their own businesses without their husband's approval. One of her quotes in the KERA Texas TrailerBlazer about her sums up the situation of a woman at the altar in Texas: "When a man and woman got married, they were one, and he was the one."

Louise Raggio began to fight for the rights of women and became the first female prosecutor in Dallas County, Texas in 1954. Years later, as Chair of the Family Law Section of the State Bar of Texas, she spearheaded the Bar's Task Force on Family Law which led to the passage of the landmark Marital Property Act of 1967. This act gave married women, for the first time, the same rights a single women by removing by law the "disabilities of coverture" giving a married woman's husband control over her property, even that that she owned prior to the marriage. For her stealthy work in securing this law, and for her later work on the Texas Family Code, she was awarded the highest award bestowed by the State Bar of Texas, the President's Award, and was given the moniker and honor as "The Mother of Family Law in Texas." In 1995, she received the prestigious award of the Margaret Brent Women Lawyers of Achievement Award and Texas Trailblazer Award in 1997. Then, in 2011, the Louise B. Raggio ABA Legacy Award was created in her name to honor individuals who have made significant contributions to the development of family law.

Among other awards received and named after her, the Louise Raggio Endowed Lecture Series was established in Southern Methodist University (SMU), first in the Women's Studies Program and later in the SMU Dedman School of Law. Past lecturers have included Gloria Steinem, Justice Ruth Bader Ginsberg, Governor Ann Richards, Valerie Plame, Herb Kelleher, Senators Claire McCaskill and Kelly Ayotte, Barbara Bush (younger), and Amal Clooney.

== Death ==
Louise Raggio died on January 23, 2011.
