= William Williams (metallurgist) =

Metallurgical engineer

- Born: 25 February 1927; Tonypandy, Glamorgan, Wales
- Died: 28 January 2011 (aged 83); Montreal, Quebec, Canada
- Education: University of Bristol; University of Toronto
- Spouse: Esther Kilgour
- Awards: Norandra Patent Award (1968); ALCAN Award (1976); METSOC Silver Medal (1991)
- Scientific career
- Fields: Metallurgy
- Workplaces: University of Chicago; McGill University; Canadian Institute of Mining, Metallurgy and Petroleum

William M. Williams (25 February 1927 – 28 January 2011) was a Welsh-born metallurgical engineer and Birks professor of metallurgy at McGill University.

== Education ==
Williams was born in Tonypandy, Wales, the son of a coal miner. In 1944, he won a scholarship to study at the University of Bristol, where he earned a bachelor's degree in 1948 and later a Master of Science in physics. In working to earn his master's degree, he studied stereo micro-radiography at the University of Chicago, under the direction of Cyril Stanley Smith. Around the same time, he also took up a position as a metallurgist with the Revere Copper Company in Rome, New York.

In 1960, Williams earned his doctorate from the University of Toronto.

== Career ==
Williams commenced lecturing at McGill University in 1960, and was selected to be the Chairman of the Department of Mining and Metallurgy in 1966. As Chairman, he was instrumental in expanding the department at a time when only six degree programs in Metallurgical Engineering were being offered in Canadian universities, among which McGill's department was the oldest. During his tenure, seven new faculty members were added to the department, with the new faculty primarily focusing its research on extractive (hydro and pyro), process and physical metallurgy. Ties between the department and Canadian industries were also strengthened during this time. Throughout his career, Williams conducted research on a variety of topics ranging from esoteric studies of grain shape to the practical aspects of abrasion resistant cast irons for mineral comminution. Williams held the position of Chairman until 1980, and retired from teaching in 1992. From 1972 to 1973, he was President of the Metallurgical Society of CIM.

As a specialist in failure analysis, Williams was consulted to investigate numerous engineering failures including such notable events as the 1965 LaSalle Heights disaster, the Mississauga train derailment of 1979, and the crash of Quebecair Flight 255. From 1990 to 2000, he was a consultant metallurgist for Via Rail. Williams also served as an expert witness in about 40 court cases in Canada and the United States, and was twice appointed Judge's Expert by justices James K. Hugessen and Antonio Lamar respectively.

== Publications ==
- "A Study of Grain Shape", Journal of Metals, July 1952, 775.
- "Stereoscopic Microradiography", Metallurgia, 63, 95, 1961.
- "Careers in the Canadian Minerals Industry", Northern Miner, December 1980.
- “An Historical Sketch of the Canadian Steel Industry.” In All That Glitters: Readings in Historical Metallurgy, edited by Michael L. Wayman, 143-146. Montreal: Canadian Institute of Mining and Metallurgy, 1989
- "Observations on an Old Broad Axe - An Example of Steeling", Bulletin of the Canadian Institute of Mining and Metallurgy, Vol. 83, No. 934, pp. 93–95, January 1990.

== Patents ==
- "Alloy White Cast Iron" U.S. Patent 3623922, November 10, 1971.
- "Annealing Process Control Method and Apparatus", U.S. Patent 4595427, June 17, 1986.
- "Annealing Process Control Method and Apparatus", Canadian Patent 1,225,522, August 18, 1987.
