= Gideon Njoku =

Nigerian footballer and coach

Personal information
- Place of birth: Nigeria
- Date of death: 10 January 2011 (aged 63)
- Place of death: Lagos, Nigeria

International career
| Years | Team | Apps | (Gls) |
- Nigeria

Managerial career
- ACB Lagos
- Enyimba

Gideon Njoku (died 10 January 2011) was a Nigerian professional football player and coach.

== Playing career ==
Njoku played for Nigeria at international level, winning a gold medal at the 1973 All-Africa Games.

== Coaching career ==
After retiring as a player, Njoku coached ACB Lagos and Enyimba.
