= Helen Bina =

American speed skater

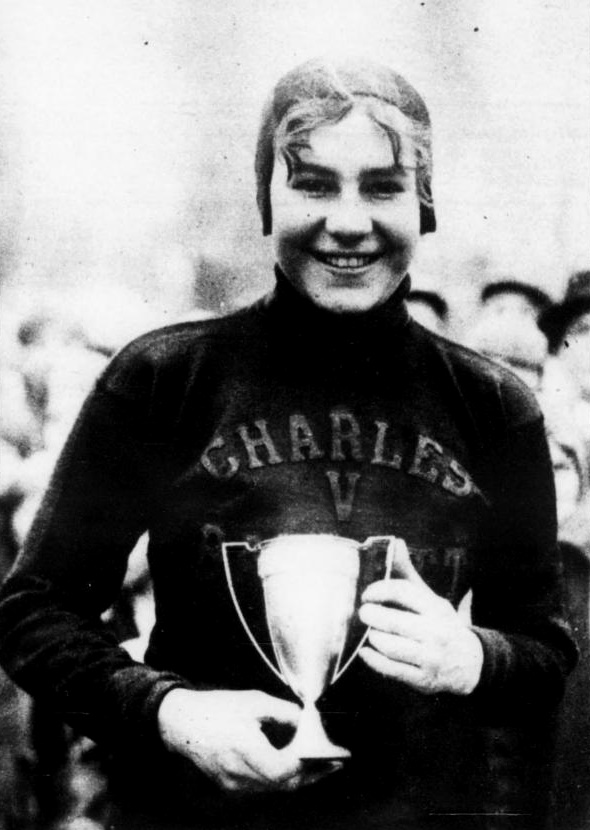
- Bina holding her trophy after winning the Women's Championship as the Annual Western Outdoor Skating Meet in 1930

Personal information
- Born: May 19, 1912
- Died: March 15, 1983 (aged 70)

Sport
- Country: United States
- Sport: Speed skating

Helen Bina (May 19, 1912 – March 15, 1983) was an American speed skater who competed in the 1932 Winter Olympics.

She competed at the women's speed skating events at the 1932 Winter Olympics which were held as demonstration sport. She finished third in the 1500 metres event and sixth in the 500 metres competition. She also participated in the 1000 metres event but was eliminated in the heats. In the unofficial 1933 World Allround Speed Skating Championships for Women in Oslo she finished third.
