= Georgiy Ball =

Russian writer (1927–2011)

- Гео́ргий Алекса́ндрович Балл
- Born: Georgiy Alexandrovich Ball; 9 June 1927 (age 99); Soviet Union
- Died: 1 January 2011 (aged 83); Moscow, Russia
- Occupation: Writer

Georgiy Alexandrovich Ball (Russian: Гео́ргий Алекса́ндрович Балл; 9 June 1927 – 1 January 2011) was a Russian writer. He was best known for his prolific work in children's literature.

== Biography ==
Georgiy was born on 9 June 1927 in the Soviet Union into the family of a psychiatrist.

He graduated from the Moscow State Institute of International Relations and worked in the international department of Moscow Radio from 1948 to 1953. Later, he started working as a correspondent of the All-Union Radio in Sverdlovsk region (1953-54). He served as the editor of the Soviet Unions magazine from 1954 to 1958. He spent a significant amount of his life touring different regions of Russia such as Irkutsk taiga, Altai Mountains, and the forests of the North.

Ball began his writing career in 1960. He published numerous fairy tales, stories and plays for children and also co-authored several publications with his wife Galina Demykina. His works in fiction for adults were published since the early 1980s, including the novel Pain Points (1983), I laugh and cry with you. Novels and Stories (1988), and the collection of stories Up for Silence (1999). He was published in many periodicals and magazines.

Ball's prose of his later career was imbued with the motif of overcoming death and pain, understanding of any misfortune, mystery of hope and kindness, love for everyone, even the lost person, and high tolerance for various human manifestations. This content was largely due to the untimely passing of his son, the artist Andrei Demykina and his wife, poet Galina Demykina. One of the sections of the collection Up for Silence is called "Death - Birth". The dramatic fates of his favorite characters, ordinary people, are inseparable from the breath of eternity. The title of one of the stories, "No Tragedy," speaks directly to the fact that death is but a milestone of inexhaustible life. His works are characterized by a natural blend of sadness, grotesque, drawn from life itself, and enlightenment.

== Recognition ==
Ball was the winner of the All-Union competition for the "Best Children's Book" (1989), the prize of the radio station "Deutsche Welle" (Cologne, 1992), the festival of small prose named after Ivan S. Turgenev (1998) and the network literary competition "Catch" (autumn 2000).

== Death ==
Ball died in 2011. He is buried in Moscow at Vagankovo Cemetery.

== Bibliography ==
- Дорога в лето. Moscow, 1962
- Жук-кривая горка. Moscow, 1968
- Малышка. Moscow, 1971
- Торопун-Карапун и тайны моего детства. Moscow, 1974
- Зобенька и серебряный колокольчик. Moscow, 1977
- Болевые точки. Moscow, 1983
- Солнечные прятки: повесть-сказка. Moscow, 1985
- Смеюсь и плачу вместе с тобой: повести и рассказы. Moscow, 1988
- Городок Жур-Жур. Moscow, 1988
- Разноцветный мост. Moscow, 1990
- Каляка-маляка ищет домик. Moscow, 1992
- Вверх за тишиной. Moscow, 1999
- Приключения Старого Башмака, рассказанные им самим. Moscow, 2003
