= Lela Brooks =

Canadian speed skater

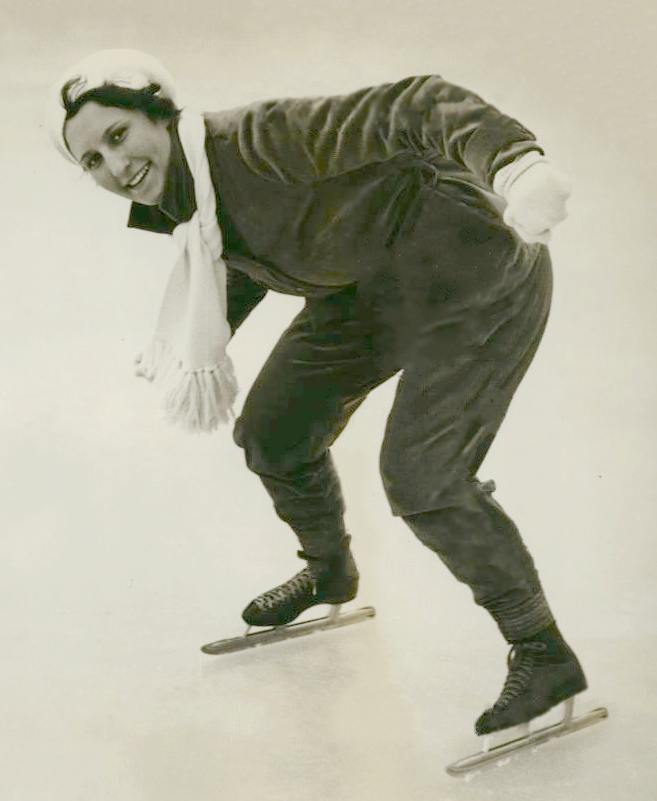
- Brooks in 1932

Personal information
- Full name: Lela Brooks Potter; Lela Brooks Campbell
- Nickname(s): Queen of the Blades; The Paavo Nurmi of Women Skaters
- Born: Lela Alene Brooks; February 7, 1908 Toronto, Ontario, Canada
- Died: September 11, 1990 (aged 82) Owen Sound, Ontario, Canada
- Spouses: William Potter (m. 1928; div. 1933); Russ Campbell (m. 1936; died 1967); Cliff Bleich (m. 1972)

Sport
- Country: Canada
- Sport: Speed skating
- Retired: 1936

Lela Alene Brooks (February 7, 1908 – September 11, 1990) was a Canadian speed skater and multiple world-record holder. She specialized in short track skating.

== Biography ==
Born in Toronto, Brooks was the first female member of the Old Orchard Skating Club and entered her first race at age 12. Her father, a dental technician, and her mother both skated and encouraged their kids toward the sport. She had two siblings, one of which was an older brother who also went on to become a Canadian skating champion. She began setting Ontario and Canadian records in 1923 at the age of 15. By the end of 1925, when she was 17, Brooks had broken six world records. She would ultimately set 17 world records and win 65 championships over her skating career, all done within North America.

At the 1932 Winter Olympics in Lake Placid, New York, she participated in three demonstration events, all with competitors from Canada and the United States. She made it to the finals in all three events, but placed no higher than fourth. Her time in the 1500 m heats, 2:54.0, was more than 15 seconds under the official world record, but the time was not recognised since the race was skated under the North American mass start rules.

In 1933, Brooks was listed among her country's elite athletes as one of "Canada's Big Trains" by the Toronto Star. Later that year, her divorce from her first husband, Arthur Potter, was widely publicized. Despite all of her achievements, Brooks remained an amateur athlete throughout her career and did not employ a formal coach. She did receive some limited sponsorship, however, as CCM provided her with $10 per week and two pairs of skates each season. She was also sponsored in her early years by millionaire ice hockey team owner Teddy Oke.

She qualified for the 1936 Winter Olympics, the first time women's speed skating competed officially, but chose to retire. Later that year, she married druggist Russ Campbell and moved to Owen Sound, Ontario, where he opened a pharmacy. They had four children together, including at least one daughter, Dorothy Jane Campbell (1947–1978). Campbell died in 1967 after 31 years of marriage. Brooks died in Owen Sound at age 82 and, though she had married a third husband, Cliff Bleich, in 1972, she was buried in Owen Sound's Greenwood Cemetery with her second husband, Russ.

In 1972, Brooks was inducted into both the Speed Skating Canada Hall of Fame and Canada's Sports Hall of Fame.

== Championships ==
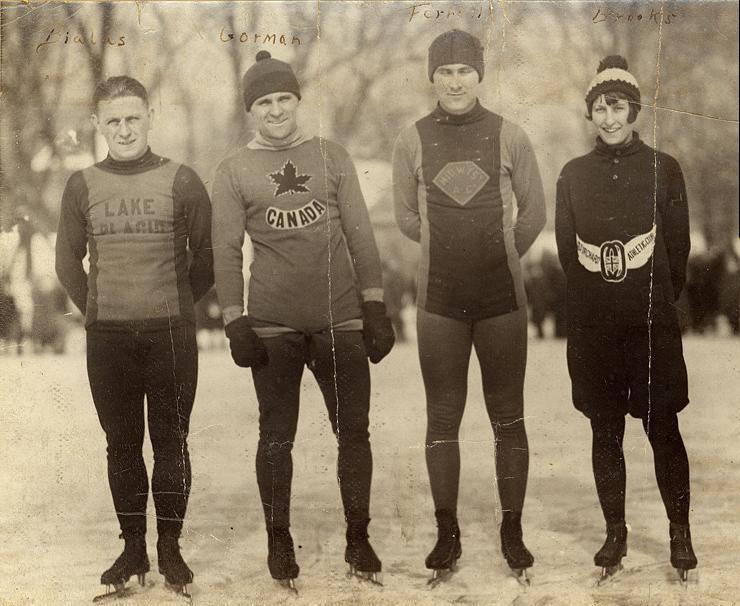
From left to right: Speed skaters Valentine Bialas, Charles Gorman, John Farrell, and Lela Brooks in Saint John, New Brunswick for the 1926 World's Amateur Speed Skating Championship

Most of the following list appeared in the Toronto Telegram on February 14, 1931.

=== 1923 ===
- 440 yards, Girls Under 18 – Ontario Championship
- 1 mile Indoor, Open – Ontario Championship

=== 1924 ===
- 440 yards, Girls Under 16 – Canadian Championship
- 880 yards, Girls Under 18 – Canadian Championship
- 880 yards, Ladies Open – Canadian Championship
- Winner of Silver Skates Derby, Chicago

=== 1925 ===
- 440 yards, Girls Under 16, Ontario Championship
- 3/4 mile, Open – Ontario Championship
- 880 yards, Open – Ontario Championship
- 220 yards, Open – Canadian Championship
- 880 yards, Girls Under 18 – Canadian Championship
- 440 yards, Open – Canadian Championship
- 880 yards, Open – Canadian Championship
- 1 mile, Open – Canadian Championship
- 880 yards, Under 18 – Indoor Ontario Championship
- 220 yards, Open – Indoor Ontario Championship
- 440 yards, Open – Indoor Ontario Championship
- 880 yards, Open – Indoor Ontario Championship
- Winner and Lap Prize Winner – Silver Skates Derby, Chicago
- 220 yards, Ladies Open – Chicago
- 440 yards, Ladies Open – Chicago
- 220 yards, International Championships, Pittsburgh
- 440 yards, International Championships, Pittsburgh
- 1 mile, International Championships, Pittsburgh
- For 3 years – Winner of Sidney E. Ballard Trophy, presented to the girls under 18, Old Orchard Speed Skating Club Annual Competition – 440, 880, 1-mile (1.6 km)

=== 1926 ===
- 880 yards, Under 18 – Canadian Championship
- 440 yards, Open – Canadian Championship
- 880 yards, Open – Canadian Championship
- 1 mile, Open – Canadian Championship
- 220 yards, Outdoor International Championships, Detroit
- 440 yards, Outdoor International Championships, Detroit
- 880 yards, Outdoor International Championships, Detroit
- 1 mile, Outdoor International Championships, Detroit
- 440 yards, Indoor International Championships, Pittsburgh
- 1 mile, Indoor International Championships, Pittsburgh
- 440 yards, Ladies Open – Worlds Championships, Saint John, New Brunswick
- 880 yards, Ladies Open – Worlds Championships, Saint John, New Brunswick
- 1 mile, Ladies Open – Worlds Championships, Saint John, New Brunswick
- Overall Ladies World Champion, Saint John, New Brunswick
- 220 yards, Open – Middle Atlantic Championships, Newburgh, New York
- 440 yards, Open – Middle Atlantic Championships, Newburgh, New York
- 880 yards, Open – Middle Atlantic Championships, Newburgh, New York

=== 1927 ===
- 220 yards, Ladies Open – Indoor International Championships, Pittsburgh
- 880 yards, Ladies Open – Indoor International Championships, Pittsburgh
- 1 mile, Ladies Open – Indoor International Championships, Pittsburgh
- 440 yards, Outdoor Canadian Championships
- 880 yards, Outdoor Canadian Championships
- 1 mile, Outdoor Canadian Championships
- 220 yards, Indoor Canadian Championships, Quebec City
- 440 yards, Indoor Canadian Championships, Quebec City
- 880 yards, Indoor Canadian Championships, Quebec City
- 1 mile, Indoor Canadian Championships, Quebec City
- 220 yards, Ladies Open – City of Toronto Championships
- 440 yards, Ladies Open – City of Toronto Championships

=== 1928 ===
- 220 yards, Middle Atlantic Championships, Newburgh, New York
- 440 yards, Middle Atlantic Championships, Newburgh, New York
- 220 yards, Indoor Championships, Detroit
- 440 yards, Indoor Championships, Detroit
- 880 yards, Indoor Championships, Detroit
- 1 mile, Mardi Gras Carnival, Detroit, broke World's Record at 3:13 4/5
  - Winner of Oakland Sports Coupe for breaking World's Record at Mardi Gras Carnival, Detroit
- 1 mile, Canadian Championship, broke World's Record

=== 1929 ===
- 440 yards, North American Championship, Detroit
- 220 yards, Ontario Outdoor Championship
- 440 yards, Ontario Outdoor Championship
- 880 yards, Ontario Outdoor Championship

=== 1930 ===
- 1/2 mile, North American Outdoor Championships, Ottawa, broke World's Record
- 3/4 mile, North American Outdoor Championships, Ottawa, broke World's Record
- North American Point Champion

=== 1932 – 1933 ===
- 880 yards, International Invitation, Detroit
- 1 mile, International Invitation, Detroit
- 1 mile, Open – Skate Derby, Detroit
- Championship – United States Western Indoor Meet
- 880 yards & 1-mile (1.6 km), International Match Races with Helen Bina, U.S. National Champion
- 1 mile, Toronto Championships at Varsity
- 440 yards, Toronto Championships at Varsity

=== 1934 ===
- North American Indoor Championships, Toronto

=== 1935 ===
- Points Champion, North American Indoor, Saint John, New Brunswick
