= Diocese of Coroatá =

Catholic ecclesiastical territory

Coordinates: 4.1269°S 44.1299°W

Diocese of Coroatá Dioecesis Coroatensis

Catholic
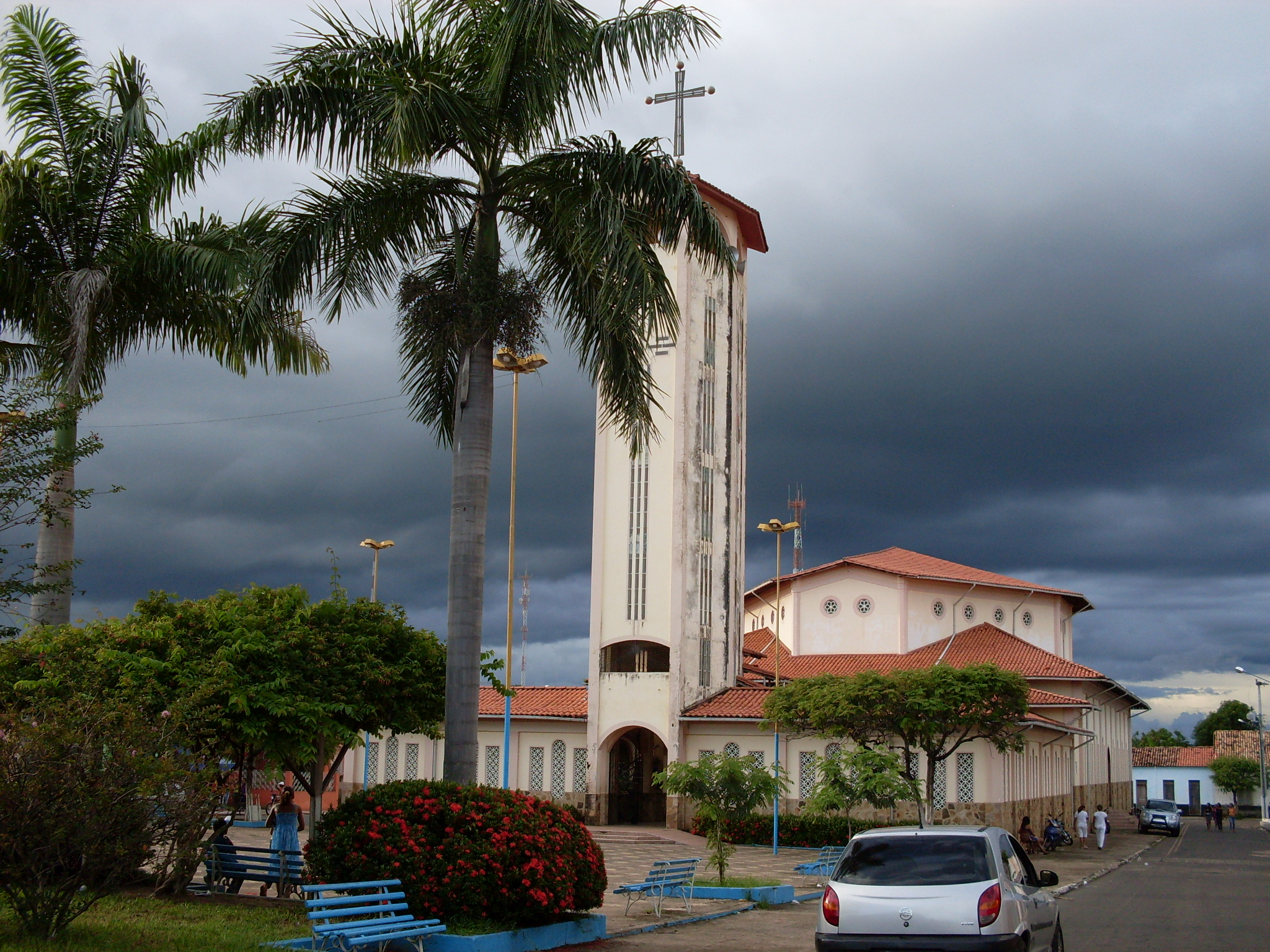
- Catedral Nossa Senhora da Piedade in 2008

Location
- Country: Brazil
- Ecclesiastical province: São Luís do Maranhão

Statistics
- Area: 18,744 km^{2} (7,237 sq mi)
- Population: Total; Catholics: (as of 2006); 501,418; 401,134 (80.0%)

Information
- Rite: Latin Rite
- Established: 26 August 1977 (49 years ago)
- Cathedral: Catedral Nossa Senhora da Piedade

Current leadership
- Pope: Leo XIV
- Bishop: Sebastião Bandeira Coêlho
- Metropolitan Archbishop: Gilberto Pastana de Oliveira

The Roman Catholic Diocese of Coroatá (Latin: Dioecesis Coroatensis) is a diocese located in the city of Coroatá in the ecclesiastical province of São Luís do Maranhão in Brazil.

== History ==
- 26 August 1977: Established as Diocese of Coroatá from the Metropolitan Archdiocese of São Luís do Maranhão

== Bishops ==
- Bishops of Coroatá (Roman rite)
  - Reinaldo Ernst Enrich (Heribert) Pünder † (5 May 1978 - 16 Jan 2011) Died
  - Sebastião Bandeira Coêlho (16 Jan 2011–present)

=== Coadjutor bishop ===
- Sebastião Bandeira Coêlho (2010-2011)

=== Other priest of this diocese who became bishop ===
- José Valdeci Santos Mendes, appointed Bishop of Brejo, Maranhão in 2010
