= George Gryaznov =

Bishop George (secular name Alexander Ivanovich Griaznov, Russian: Александр Иванович Грязнов (January 26, 1934 – April 1, 2011) was the Russian Orthodox archbishop of Chelyabinsk and Zlatoust and later bishop of Lyudinovo, auxiliary bishop of the Kaluga eparchy.
