= Michel Gratton (journalist) =

Canadian journalist

Michel Gratton (December 30, 1952 – January 13, 2011) was a Canadian journalist. He held the post of Press Secretary for Prime Minister of Canada Brian Mulroney from 1984 to 1987.

He worked as a journalist for the Ottawa Sun and Le Droit.

In 1987, he published a book So, What Are the Boys Saying? about his time working with Prime Minister Mulroney.

In November 1986, allegations were reported in the media of "sexist conduct" by Gratton. Due to media attention to the matter, he resigned as Mulroney's press secretary in March 1987. Gratton apologized to three women journalists in 1986 for "unbecoming conduct". One of those women has accused Gratton of sexual assault and harassment. None of the women went to police and no charges were ever laid against Gratton.

Gratton played an important role in the campaign to prevent the closure of Montfort Hospital in Ottawa during the 1990s.

In 2011, École secondaire Michel-Gratton in Windsor, Ontario was named in his honour. The name was abandoned after the school board became aware of the earlier allegations of misconduct.
