= Chrysanth Chepil =

Metropolitan Chrysanth (Russian: Хрисанф secular name Yakov Antonovich Chepil, Russian: Яков Антонович Чепиль; 24 June 1937, Volhynia – 4 January 2011, Moscow) was the Russian Orthodox metropolitan bishop of Vyatka, Russia.
