= Jean Wilson (speed skater) =

Canadian speed skater (1910–1933)

Personal information
- Nationality: Canadian
- Born: 19 July 1910; Glasgow, Scotland, UK
- Died: 3 September 1933 (aged 23); Toronto, Ontario, Canada

Sport
- Country: Canada
- Sport: speed skating

Jean Wilson was an Olympic Speed Skater.

She was born on July 19, 1910, in Glasgow but her family emigrated to Canada when she was a child. She began to skate at the age of 15 and represented Canada at the 1932 Olympics where Women's speed skating was a demonstration event. She won the 500 metre event, broke the Olympic record on two occasions on the way to claiming second place in the 1,500 metres and fell, while in the lead, just before the finish line in the 1,000 metres after Kit Klein from the United States.

She developed myasthenia gravis, an auto immune disease and died on September 3, 1933, at the age of 23. In 1934 the Jean Wilson Trophy for indoor women's speed skating was created by the Toronto Telegram in her memory.
