= Leonay =

Suburb of Sydney, Australia

- Suburb
- Interactive map of Leonay
- Country: Australia
- State: New South Wales
- LGA: Penrith City Council
- Location: 58 km (36 mi) west of Sydney CBD; 47 km (29 mi) east of Katoomba
- Established: 1974

Government
  - State electorate: Penrith
  - Federal division: Macquarie
- Elevation: 47 m (154 ft)

Population
  - Total: 2,582 (2021 census)
- Postcode: 2750
Suburbs around Leonay
Glenbrook	Emu Plains	Emu Plains
Lapstone	Leonay	Jamisontown
Blue Mountains National Park	Mulgoa	Regentville

Leonay (/ˈliːoʊneɪ/ LEE-oh-nay) is a suburb of Sydney, in the state of New South Wales, Australia. It is 58 kilometres (36 mi) west of the Sydney central business district, in the local government area of the City of Penrith. It is part of the Greater Western Sydney region.

Leonay is located on the western side of the Nepean River, at the foot of the Blue Mountains. The suburb is bounded by the M4 Motorway, the western railway line, and the Nepean River. One of Leonay's prominent features is the golf course which meanders through the suburb.

== History ==
The area was once the vineyard of Leo Buring, the suburbs name is combination of his and his wife, Nay's, name. The vineyard has been replaced with designer homes climbing the hill at the foot of the Blue Mountains Escarpment.

== Aboriginal culture ==
Prior to European settlement, what is now Leonay was home to the Mulgoa people who spoke the Darug language. They lived as both hunter-gatherer and in a land management system governed by traditional laws including when certain foods would be cultivated or left alone. These are ancient traditions which evolved from early human origins in the Dreamtime. Their homes were bark huts called 'gunyahs'. They hunted kangaroos and emus for meat, and gathered yams, berries and other native plants.

== European settlement ==
The first British explorers known to have visited Leonay were Jamison, Johnston, Wentworth and Jones in 1818 who named Glenbrook Creek at the point where it enters the Nepean River in what is now Leonay. For many years it was considered part of neighbouring Emu Plains first as part of Sir Francis Forbes' Edinglassie Estate and then as part of Leo Buring's vineyard, Leonay. During the early years of settlement, Buring had a small fort, Fort Sanctuary, constructed to overlook his vineyard. Following Buring's death in 1961, the vineyard closed down and most of the land was sold to developers. The first houses were built in 1965 and in 1974, the name was officially changed to Leonay. Leonay Post Office opened on 1 December 1977 and closed in 1979. Many homeless individuals made use of Fort Sanctuary as a shelter until it was boarded up in 1987; a small but influential local movement exists calling for the fort to be heritage listed.

== Transport ==
The nearest railway station is Lapstone railway station (accessible by walking only) and the nearest road accessible railway station is Emu Plains railway station on the Western Line of the Sydney Trains network. The local bus service is provided by the Blue Mountains Bus Company and connects Leonay to Penrith. Leonay Parade is the main road into the suburb, connecting with both Emu Plains and the M4 Western Motorway, which in turn provides quick connection to greater Sydney and the Blue Mountains.

== Education ==
Leonay Public School is the only school in the suburb. The nearest high school is Nepean Creative and Performing Arts High School in Emu Plains.

== Population ==
=== Demographics ===
The recorded population of Leonay in the 2021 census was 2,582. Most residents were Australian born (80.7%) with the next most common places of birth being England (5.1%), New Zealand (0.9%) and Germany (0.8%). 89.8% of people spoke only English at home. The most common responses for religion were No Religion 35.6%, Catholic 30.3% and Anglican 16.9%. Reflecting the era in which the suburb developed, there are few apartments or terraces in the suburb with 98.6% of the 874 occupied dwellings being detached houses, with 1.6% being semi-detached and 0.3% being apartments. The median income ($2,466 per week) was noticeably higher than the national average ($1,746).

=== Notable residents ===
- Ivan Cleary (Professional Rugby League coach for the Penrith Panthers)
- Nathan Cleary (Professional Rugby League player for the Penrith Panthers)

== Governance ==
At a local government level, Leonay is part of the south ward of Penrith City Council, represented by:

- Hollie McLean
- Faithe Skinner
- Kirstie Boerst
- Sue Day
- Vanessa Pollak

The current mayor is Todd Carney. At the state level, it is part of the Electoral district of Penrith, represented by Labor MP Karen McKeown. Federally, it is part of the Division of Macquarie, represented by Susan Templeman of the Australian Labor Party.
