= Lapstone Monocline =

Geological structure in New South Wales, Australia

Lapstone Monocline Lapstone Structural Complex
- Monocline, fault-propagation fold and thrust-fault system
- View across the rugged sandstone landscape of the Lapstone Monocline, forming the eastern margin of the Blue Mountains
- Location: New South Wales, Australia
- Age: Cenozoic (probably Late Cenozoic)
- Geology: Hawkesbury Sandstone, Narrabeen Group and other Sydney Basin sedimentary rocks

Dimensions
  - Length: 95 km (59 mi)

The Lapstone Monocline is a major geological structure in New South Wales, Australia, forming much of the prominent eastern escarpment of the lower Blue Mountains west of Sydney. It forms part of the broader Lapstone Structural Complex (LSC), a north-trending system of monoclines, reverse faults and thrust faults separating the elevated lower Blue Mountains from the Cumberland Plain to the east.

The structure is one of the most conspicuous tectonic and topographic features of the Sydney Basin. It is expressed topographically as the abrupt rise from the relatively low-lying Cumberland Plain to the sandstone plateaux of the Blue Mountains and has influenced the development of drainage, escarpments and other landforms along the western margin of the Sydney metropolitan area. Although traditionally referred to as a single monocline extending for approximately 100–150 km, modern structural studies have shown that the feature is segmented and changes considerably along strike. The term Lapstone Structural Complex is therefore generally used in geological literature for the entire system.

== Geography ==
The Lapstone Structural Complex follows the eastern margin of the Blue Mountains and western edge of the Cumberland Plain. Modern structural mapping identifies the complex over a distance of approximately 95 kilometres (59 mi), although broader topographic and structural expressions associated with the Lapstone Monocline have been traced for more than 150 kilometres (93 mi) through the Sydney Basin. It extends approximately north–south, from the vicinity of Bargo and the Nepean River in the south through Glenbrook, Lapstone and Kurrajong Heights, towards the Colo River region in the north.

The monocline forms part of the transition between the elevated sandstone plateaux of the Blue Mountains and the lower Cumberland Plain, a structural and topographic depression forming much of western Sydney. In places, the eastern margin of the complex forms an escarpment rising approximately 200–400 m above the adjoining plain.

== Geology ==
The Lapstone Monocline deforms the sedimentary succession of the Sydney Basin, including the prominent Triassic Hawkesbury Sandstone and underlying rocks of the Narrabeen Group. The Hawkesbury Sandstone forms many of the cliffs, ridges and rock exposures along the eastern Blue Mountains. The rocks of the Sydney Basin are generally only gently deformed, making the Lapstone Monocline one of the basin's most significant large-scale folds. The Australian Museum describes the Lapstone and Tomah monoclines as the principal large-scale folds of the basin.

Earlier interpretations often treated the eastern escarpment as a relatively simple monocline. Detailed mapping, however, demonstrated that its structure varies considerably along its length. It may occur as a single monocline, a double monocline, or be associated with normal and high-angle reverse faults. Associated structures include smaller folds, thrusts, joint systems, tectonic breccias, sedimentary injections and igneous dykes. The western side of the structural complex contains a series of overlapping faults historically known as the Kurrajong Fault System. These faults and the monocline together define a broad zone of deformation rather than a single continuous fault or fold.

The monocline is particularly well exposed around the suburb of Lapstone, from which it takes its name. Here the lower Blue Mountains rise sharply above the western edge of the Cumberland Plain. Sandstone exposures associated with the monocline occur along transport cuttings and natural outcrops. Exposures are present at Lapstone railway station, where folded sedimentary rocks and associated geological structures can be observed. Transport for NSW describes the feature there as an upfolding of the sedimentary strata of the Sydney Basin and notes exposures on the station platform and in bushland immediately to the east. Several exposures of the Lapstone Monocline are recognised as local heritage items within the City of Blue Mountains, including sites along the Great Western Highway, Mitchell's Pass and between Hawkesbury Lookout and Mount Riverview.

=== Structure and formation ===
Modern interpretations regard the Lapstone Structural Complex as a product predominantly of compressional deformation. Fergusson and Hatherly (2023) interpreted the complex as the near-surface expression of a deeply penetrating, west-dipping thrust fault extending into the brittle middle crust. Upward propagation of movement on this structure through the upper approximately 3 kilometres (1.9 mi) of the Sydney Basin succession produced a combination of faults and folds at shallower levels.

The style of deformation changes from north to south. In the northern part of the complex, inferred imbricate faults at depth die out upward into a major east-facing monocline. The central limb of this fold generally dips less than 20° eastward. Around Hawkesbury Lookout, however, strata locally become steeply dipping to almost vertical. In the central part, the monocline has been interpreted as a fault-propagation fold developed above a west-dipping thrust. Farther south, deformation becomes increasingly concentrated into individual thrust structures, including the Bargo Fault and Nepean Fault. This interpretation differs from some older models in which the structure was related to steep extensional faults or basement block faulting. Strike-slip movement has also been proposed as having contributed to parts of its structural history.

== Age ==
The age of the Lapstone Monocline has been debated. Earlier interpretations proposed deformation ranging from the Mesozoic to the early Cenozoic. Branagan and Pedram (1990) interpreted the main phase of deformation as occurring during the Early Tertiary, while acknowledging evidence for a longer and more complex structural history. A 2011 study using structural relationships and palaeomagnetic evidence constrained development of the Lapstone Structural Complex broadly between the mid-Cretaceous and Miocene, and suggested a Paleogene age for the principal uplift and deformation.

More recent research has favoured a substantially younger origin. Fergusson and Hatherly (2023) concluded that the complex is probably Late Cenozoic in age and developed late in the uplift history of the southeastern Australian highlands. Under this model, the Lapstone structures post-date both the major Cretaceous uplift associated with development of Australia's eastern margin and Cenozoic volcanic activity in the region. Research published in 2026 reassessed the relationship between the structural complex and the nearby Green Scrub Basalt. The basalt had previously been interpreted as a lava flow approximately 18.8 million years old, potentially providing a minimum age for deformation. Detailed mapping instead identified the basalt as a volcanic neck, meaning that it does not constrain the age of the Lapstone Structural Complex. The study suggested that deformation may have begun during the Neogene.

== Geomorphology ==
The Lapstone Monocline has strongly influenced the landscape along the eastern margin of the Blue Mountains. Resistant Hawkesbury Sandstone exposed by uplift and erosion forms prominent ridges, cliffs and escarpments overlooking the Cumberland Plain. The structural complex is associated with up to several hundred metres of structural and topographic relief. The rocks on the western side of the monocline are substantially elevated relative to equivalent strata on the Cumberland Plain. The Cumberland Plain itself occupies a downwarped structural area east of the monocline and consists largely of rolling terrain developed on the softer rocks of the Wianamatta Group.

Evidence for uplift includes elevated deposits of Rickabys Creek Gravel, interpreted as remnants of former river deposits displaced above their original levels. Stream profiles crossing the structural complex also contain knickpoints and other drainage anomalies attributed to deformation and uplift. The Nepean River cuts across the structure in a deeply incised gorge near the southern lower Blue Mountains. Farther north, the structural complex has influenced drainage patterns around the Hawkesbury River and its tributaries. The northern end of the Lapstone Monocline also controls the form of the Mellong Range.

== Tectonic activity ==
The Lapstone Structural Complex is regarded as a neotectonic structure and has experienced deformation during the geologically recent history of eastern Australia. Fergusson and Hatherly interpreted the deep thrust underlying the complex as potentially seismogenic, meaning it is capable of generating earthquakes within the brittle crust.

This does not necessarily mean that the Lapstone Monocline constitutes an active surface fault. Studies considered in relation to the safety of Warragamba Dam found no evidence of surface fault activity during approximately the last 35,000 years, and the structure has consequently not been classified as an active fault under relevant Australian dam-safety criteria.

== See also ==
- Sydney Basin
- Blue Mountains (New South Wales)
- Cumberland Plain
- Hawkesbury Sandstone
- Geology of New South Wales
