= Lapstone =

- Suburb
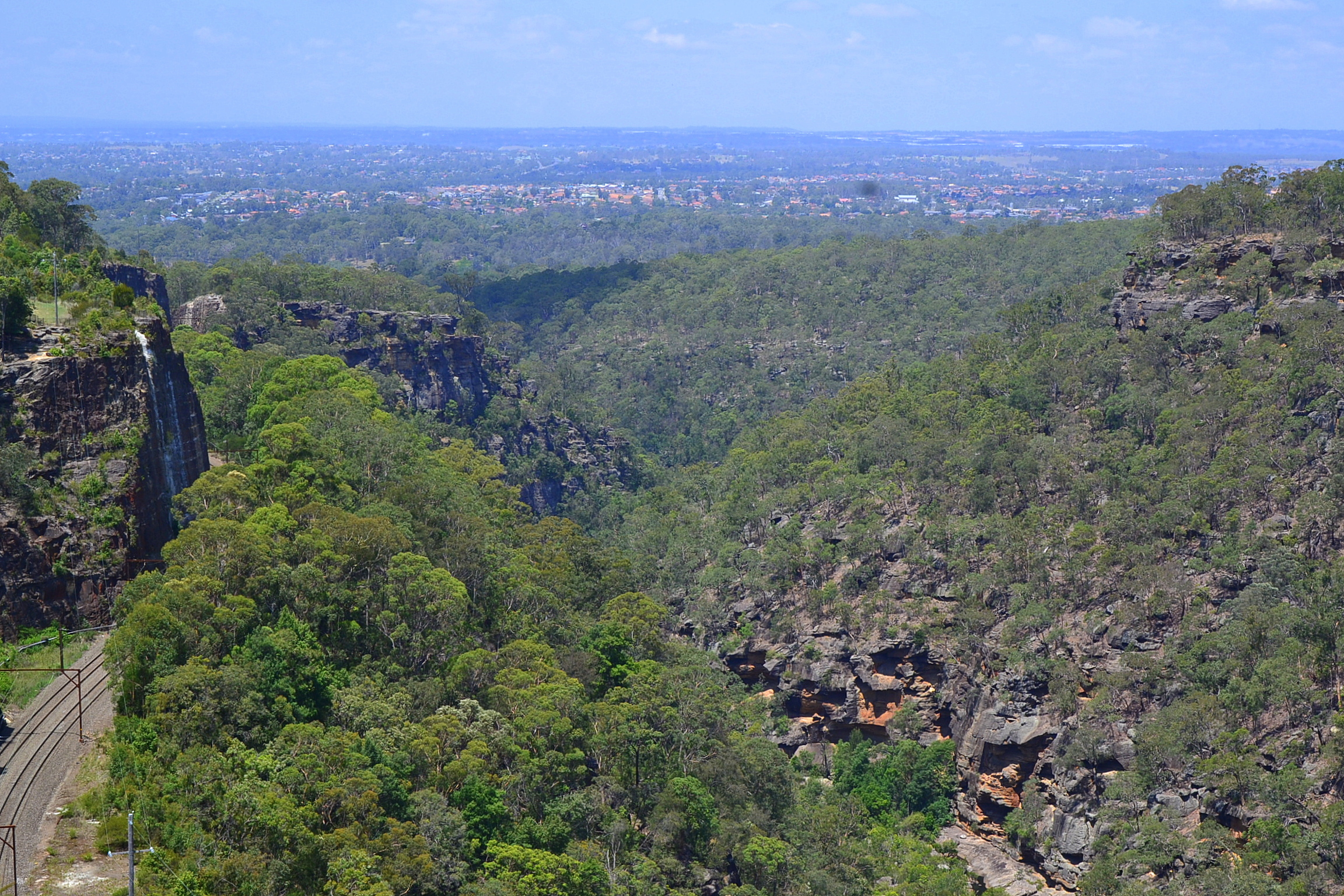
- View east from south Lapstone looking down into Glenbrook Gorge

- Interactive map of Lapstone
- Coordinates: 33°46′26″S 150°38′13″E
- Country: Australia
- State: New South Wales
- City: Blue Mountains
- LGA: City of Blue Mountains
- First People: Dharug
- Location: 60 km (37 mi) W of Sydney CBD; 45 km (28 mi) E of Katoomba
- Established: 1954

Government
  - State electorates: Blue Mountains; Penrith
  - Federal division: Macquarie
- Elevation: 160 m (520 ft)

Population
  - Total: 948 (2021 census)
- Postcode: 2773
Suburbs around Lapstone
Glenbrook	Glenbrook	Emu Plains
Glenbrook	Lapstone	Leonay
Blue Mountains National Park	Mulgoa	Leonay

Lapstone is an Australian township on the eastern escarpment of the Blue Mountains in New South Wales at an elevation of 160 metres (520 ft). Lapstone is located 62 kilometres (39 mi) west of the Sydney CBD in the local government area of the City of Blue Mountains and is part of the federal electorate of Macquarie. Lapstone consists mostly of stand-alone housing and has a few public facilities. At the 2021 census, Lapstone had a population of 948 people. Lapstone was originally bought and developed by Arthur J. Hand, an alderman of the Blue Mountains City Council.

Lapstone is the first town in the easternmost escarpment of the Blue Mountains. Its name comes from the many water-worn stones in the area that resemble those used by cobblers to work the leather when making shoes.

== History ==
=== Indigenous History ===
The land is the traditional land of the Dharug Aboriginal people. The land was a seasonal camping area thanks to its proximity to the Nepean River. A meeting place of the Oryang clan of Springwood was located on the river downstream of Lapstone.

=== Early history ===
Blaxland, Lawson and Wentworth were the first Europeans to explore the Lapstone area, climbing up the Lapstone Hill and reaching Glenbrook Lagoon on 12 May 1813 on their successful trek across the Great Dividing Range.

The first road was built by William Cox and a gang of convicts, up the Lapstone Hill through Lapstone and across the Blue Mountains, about 1815 (a plaque on the site of the old Cox Road can be seen off Governor Drive at the M4 junction).

The first reference to "Lapstone Hill" (Which covers an area larger than modern Lapstone) was in a letter from 1822.

Cox Road was replaced by "The Western Road" across Lennox Stone Bridge and up the Lapstone Hill in 1833 and, following the railway in 1867, "The Great Western Highway". The highway is now the main road up Lapstone Hill and across the Blue Mountains.

=== Name ===
The town contains the presence of tertiary gravels. Caused by the uplifting of an ancient river by the Lapstone Monocline. These water worn stones resemble those used by cobblers to work the leather when making shoes.

The first known reference to the name was from Elizabeth Hawkins when she traveled to Bathurst in 1822. Writing: "We now began our ascent up the first lapstone hill, so called from all the stones being like a cobbler's lapstone". However it is unlikely this is referring to the location of the modern lapstone. The name has been used for several places on the eastern escarpment of the Blue Mountains over time. Typically referring to wherever the main route up the Blue Mountains was.

==== Lapstone Zig Zag ====
The Lapstone Zig Zag line (or "little" zig zag) opened near Glenbrook in 1867.

The ascent of Lapstone Hill, on a gradient of 1 in 30-33, was built up the side of the range with comparatively light earthwork.

It included the substantial seven-span sandstone Knapsack Viaduct, which later had work performed upon it to carry the Great Western Highway along it, after the deviation of the railway was placed through Glenbrook Gorge.

The line travelled from the viaduct along part of what is now the Great Western Highway then along part of what is now Governors Drive before entering a cutting.

Here trains 'switched back' to travel up the middle road to Lucasville Station, which was built by John Lucas to access his property at Lapstone, which is now the housing estate between the Great Western Highway, the RAAF base, and Knapsack Gully. Remains of the platform can still be seen at this location.

The line then traversed the eastern end of Knapsack Street before swinging onto what is now the Great Western Highway.

The top and middle roads of the zig zag, along with the portion over Knapsack Viaduct are all part of a walking trail along the old alignment, which includes a memorial to John Whitton, the engineer in charge of railway construction in the early years of NSW, considered by many as 'The Father of Railways in NSW', at the Emu Plains end of the walk.

==== Lapstone Hill Tunnel ====
The construction of the first tunnel was depicted by Australian impressionist painter Arthur Streeton in Fire's On (1891, Art Gallery of New South Wales).

A new route was opened on 18 December 1892 to avoid the Lapstone Zig Zag.

After crossing the viaduct, the line continued along the previous bottom road of the Zig Zag to where the switching station was, before continuing along and curving around to the west to travel under the ridge line in a single track tunnel. The line then traversed what is now a service road off Barnet Street before rejoining the original alignment off the Zig Zag which is now the Great Western Highway.

The tunnel emerges approximately 260 metres west of the intersection of the Great Western Highway and Mount Street Glenbrook at the end of the service road, and had a total length of 660 metres.

The tunnel can still be seen from neighbouring bush tracks., and Blue Mountains City Council plan to reopen the tunnel as part of a walkway between Glenbrook and Lapstone.

The new tunnel was hailed as a major improvement in allowing, but problems with ventilation, along with water from the creek that had to be deviated at the eastern end, and natural seepage led to trains getting stuck.

The Lapstone Tunnel was finally closed and replaced on 24 September 1913.

The abandoned Lapstone Tunnel was used by the nearby RAAF base during World War II as storage for munitions and mustard gas. The RAAF laid a concrete floor for better storage and access. After the war, the tunnel was used for a period of time to grow mushrooms.

==== Glenbrook Tunnel ====
In 1913, the present route was constructed to bypass the Lapstone tunnel, going along the escarpment of Glenbrook Gorge and through a new tunnel at the spot known as The Bluff. One of the features of this project was the construction of a temporary railway line that crossed Darks Common south of Explorers Road. The rail line has been removed but the cutting can still be seen, as well as the remains of the winding house base near the escarpment. This was known as the Spur-line and was in operation from 1911 to 1913, the line and cutting now forming a part of a nature walk through Darks Common. The Glenbrook Tunnel, 282 metres in length, came into operation on 11 May 1913 and is still used today.

==== Lapstone Hill Hotel ====
The land occupied by the present RAAF base (which is not within the bounds of modern day Lapstone, but is within the bounds of the larger "Lapstone Hill") was originally owned in the 1870s by John Lucas (1818 - 1902). He built a country retreat on the land called "Lucasville" close to his private Lucasville railway station but sold the property to Charles Smith. Smith built his own house, called "Logie", higher up the hill above the railway and Lucas's little cottage. Smith died in 1897. The "Logie" house and estate were inherited by his son Colin. In 1921, "Logie" and its estate were bought by Herwold Kirkpatrick and his brother-in-law. Kirkpatrick was a well known architect and from the late 1920s he set out to transform the Logie Cottage and grounds into a luxury Hotel.

The Lapstone Hill Hotel was officially opened in 1930 and was a major art deco luxury hotel. The grounds of some 6 hectares (15 acres) were planned with lawns, flowers, fruit and vegetable gardens, with water pumped from the Nepean River far below. The hotel had views of the Nepean River and offered views of the Sydney metropolis. The hotel was extremely fashionable throughout the 1930s. The hotel was noted for adverting the benefits of the mountain environment on people's health and attracted many people from Sydney who wanted to escape city life. In 1930 the first Talkie movie in Australia premiered at Lapstone Hotel.

In September 1938, Lapstone hotel hosted the second British Commonwealth Relations Conference, organised by the Royal Institute of International Affairs (Chatham House).

In 1949 the Lapstone Hill Hotel and grounds were offered to the Commonwealth Department of Defence as a new headquarters for the RAAF's Eastern Area Command, the RAAF Base Glenbrook. No personnel actually lived in the 57 rooms of the former hotel during the first twenty years of RAAF use, but in 1982 a new administration block was opened and the former hotel became entirely the officers' mess: about 35 officers were then accommodated in the upper story. Downstairs suites are used for visiting VIPs and were created in 1994 by the architect Robert Staas and the interior designer Elizabeth Mackie, retaining the art deco theme

==== New Lapstone Hotel ====
The New Lapstone Hotel was built in the 1950s further up the Great Western Highway at Blaxland, after the Lapstone Hill Hotel and grounds were purchased by the RAAF. The hotel was called "The New Lapstone Hotel" until the 1980s.

Today the hotel is known as "The Lapstone Hotel". It was renovated in 2007 after being purchased by the Lewis Group of Hotels.

== Modern Lapstone ==
=== Housing development ===
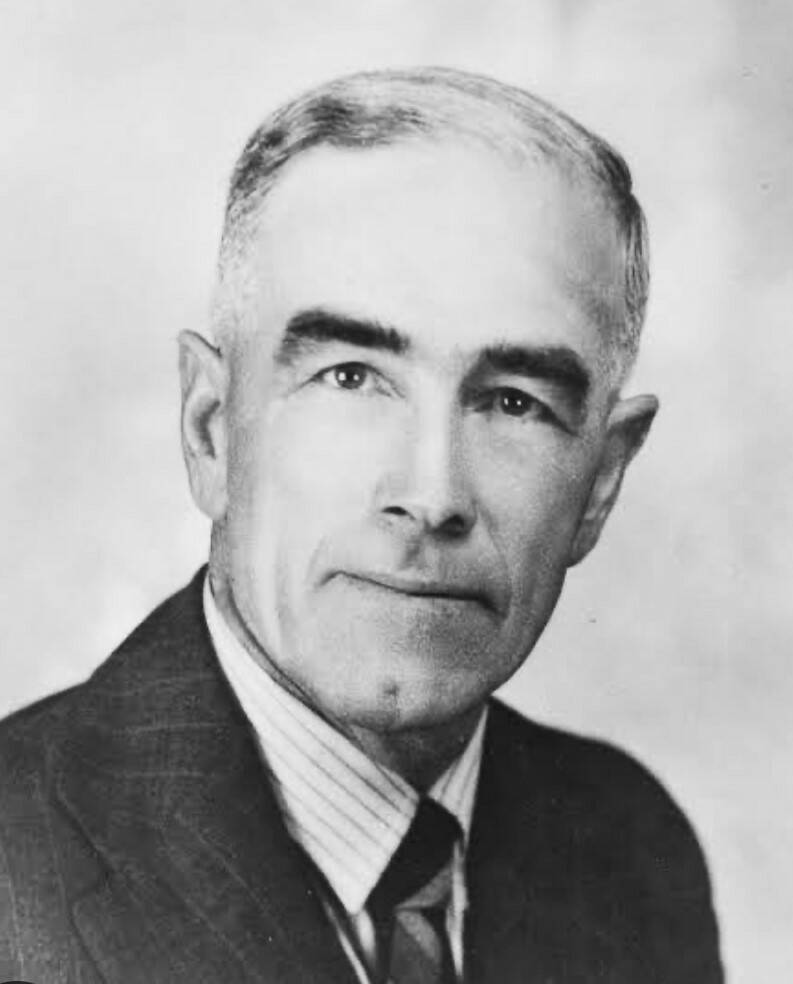
Arthur J. Hand

In 1954 Arthur J. Hand bought 114 acres of land known as Stephens Paddock to develop the suburb. The railway station was opened in 1964 to service the new housing estate.

Lapstone railway station was opened to services on 24 February 1964 and afterwards it appointed itself the name Lapstone.

=== Darks Common ===
Darks Common became a public reserve in the 1970s to prevent further housing development. The leading voice in the conservation of the area was local Micheal Dark, son of author Eleanor Dark and her husband Erick Dark. The reserve, now protected by the council, bears the name of the family.

There are many walking tracks throughout the common, the Spur-Line walking track leads to the Glenbrook Creek and views of Glenbrook Gorge at Bluff lookout. Lapstone Oval is located inside Darks Common.

== Geography ==
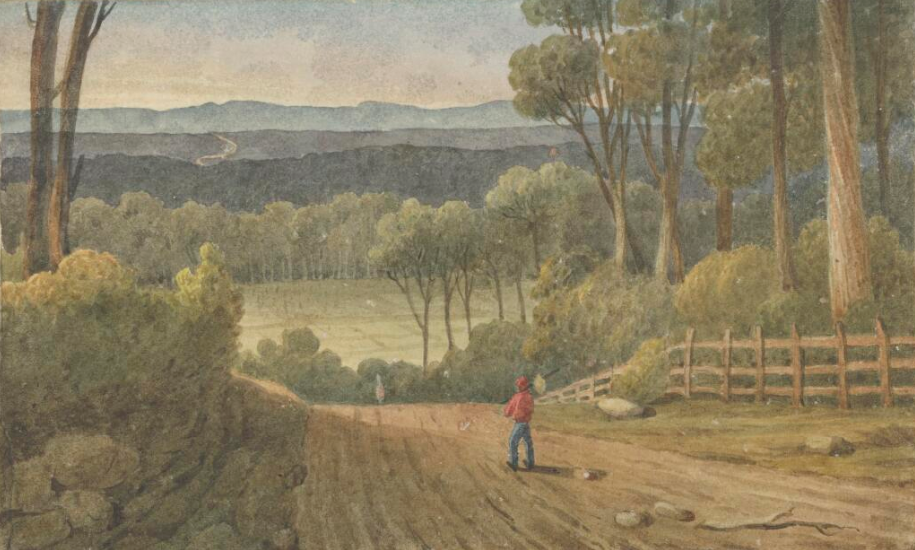
A distant view of the Blue Mountains and Lapston Hill, New South Wales taken from the Emu Plains Road by Augustus Earle.

Lapstone is located on the eastern foothills of the Blue Mountains, on the Lapstone Monocline, which extends 150 kilometres from Bargo in the south to the Colo River in the north and rises 200 metres from the Cumberland Plain. The Lapstone Monocline is described as resembling "Step like folds in horizontal rock layers".

The town is on a steep, bush covered area of the Monocline with sandstone cliffs viable from Penrith.

Lapstone is split by gullies into 3 "Islands".

== Population ==
In the 2021 Census, there were 948 people in Lapstone. Of these 81.6% were born in Australia and 89.2% spoke only English at home. The most common responses for religion were No Religion at 37.9%, Catholic at 22.3% and Anglican at 17.9%.

== Public transport ==
Lapstone railway station is on the Blue Mountains Line of the Sydney Trains Intercity network. Lapstone can be accessed by road from the Great Western Highway/M4 Motorway by exiting at Governors Drive and Explorers Road from Glenbrook. The station was built by R&K McGraw Builders sub-contracting bricklayer Frank Davis of Lapstone.

Lapstone railway station was officially opened on 24 February 1964. The area is also serviced by buses.

== Education ==
- Lapstone Public School, opened in 1971. Jean Ranft (later Jean Jones) single-handedly took on various government departments to gain funding for a one-room (plus toilets and kitchen) concrete-block building, and also took on some of the construction work, along with the rest of the Ranft family and other members of the Lapstone community.
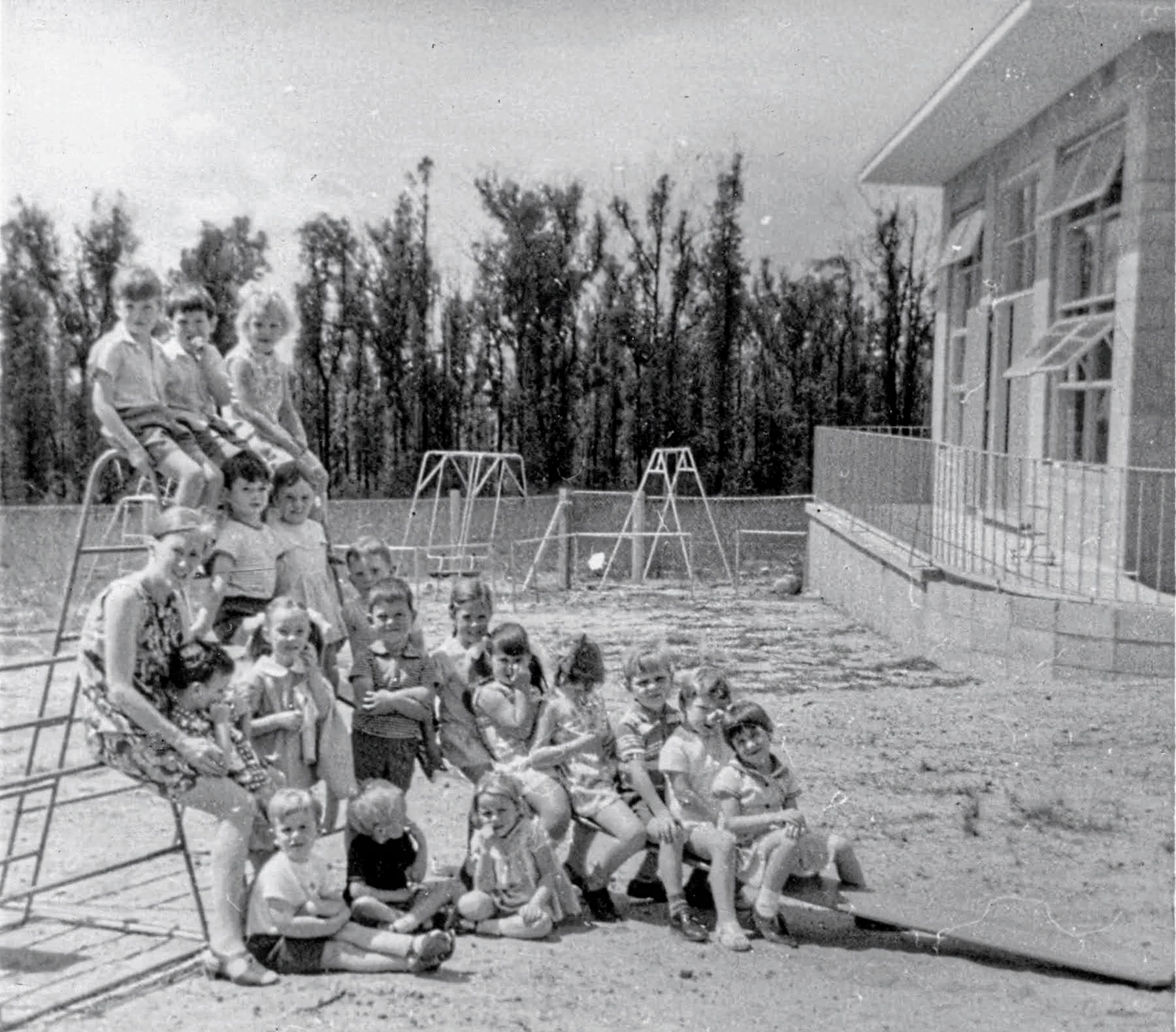
  Jean Ranft is pictured with the first class in 1971 with the viewable regrowth in the bushland after the devastating 1968 bushfires.

== Sport and recreation ==
The Lapstone Netball Courts are home to the Lapstone-Glenbrook Netball Club. There are nine asphalt courts and two grass courts at the complex, including a clubhouse and BBQ area. All clubs form the Blue Mountains Netball Association and play matches at the complex on Saturdays. Netball is the largest participation sport in the Blue Mountains.

Founded in 1975, the Lapstone-Glenbrook Netball Club was formed from a merger between what was St Peter's Netball Club and school-based teams at the Lapstone Public School and the Glenbrook Public School. St Peter's Netball Club was a founding club of the Blue Mountains Netball Association and was run from the church organisation previously based in the St Peter's Anglican Church building which is now used as a cafe in Glenbrook).

Lapstone Oval is home to the Blue Mountains District Rugby Football Club and its junior club, Blue Tongues Rugby. It features a Rugby Union field and an artificial cricket pitch.

The Glenbrook-Blaxland Cricket Club play matches on the oval in the summer months.

There are two tennis courts at Lapstone Oval.

== Gallery ==
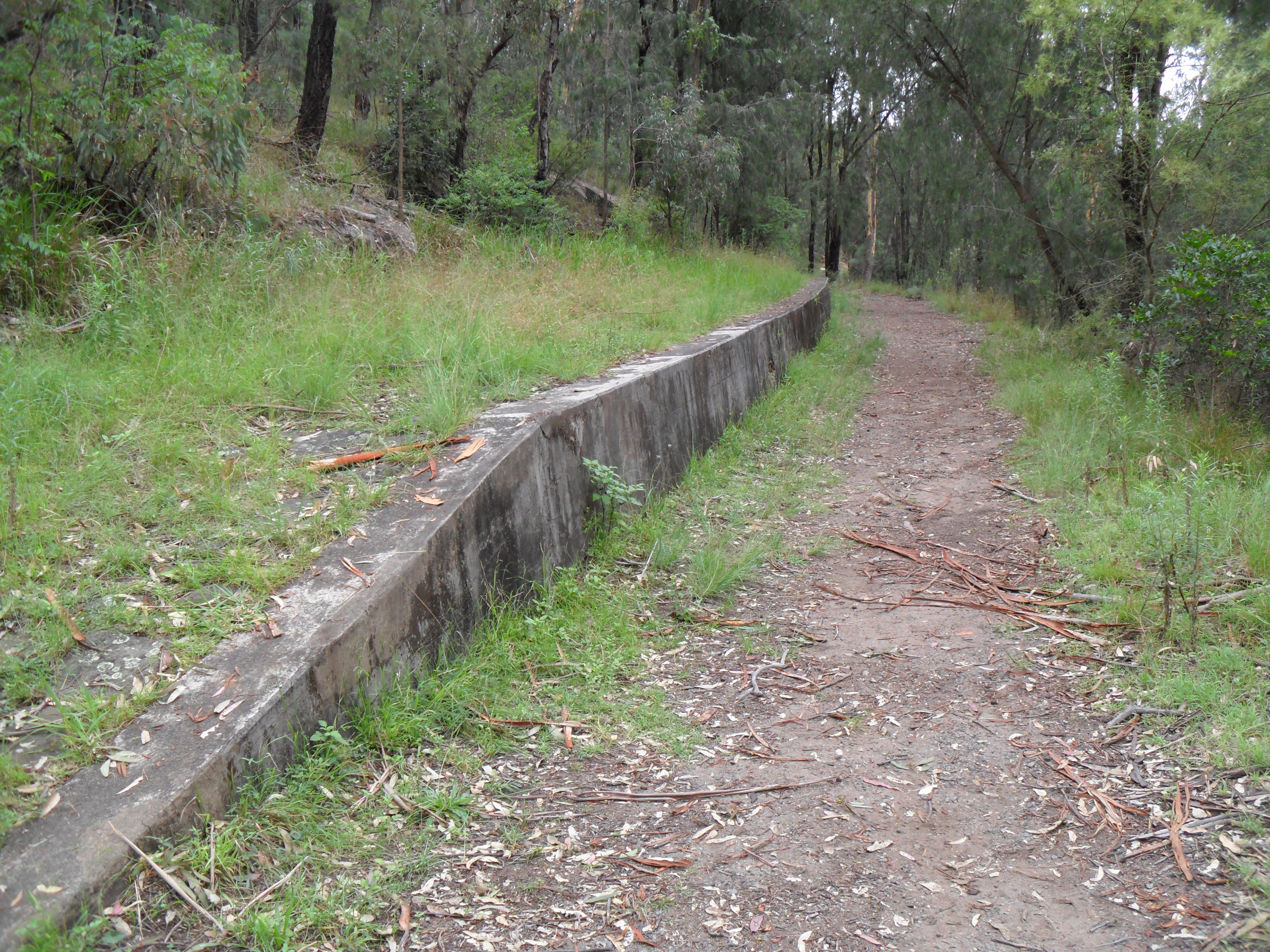
Remains of Lucasville Station on the Zig Zag line.

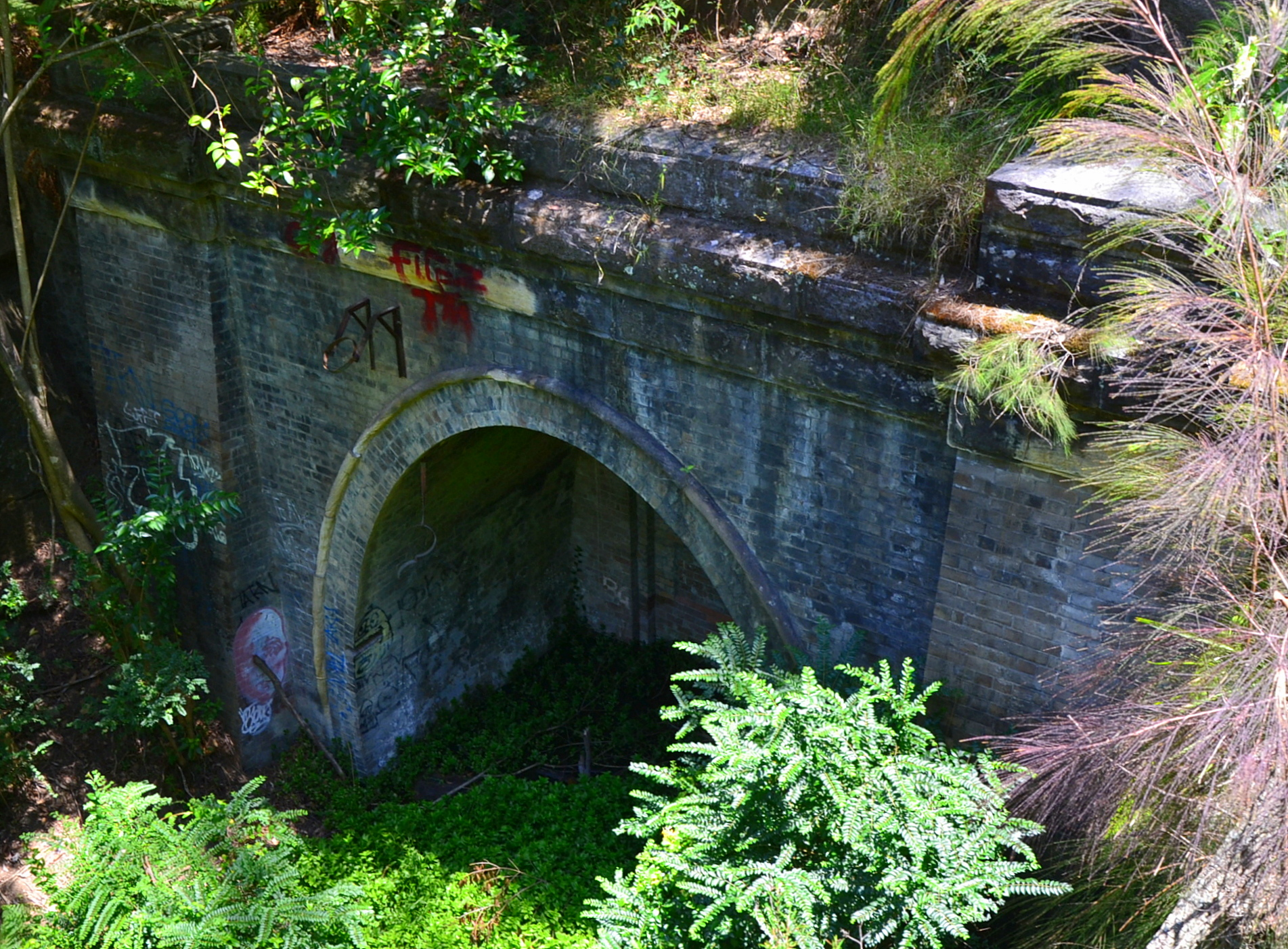
Glenbrook Tunnel constructed in 1892, eastern entrance.

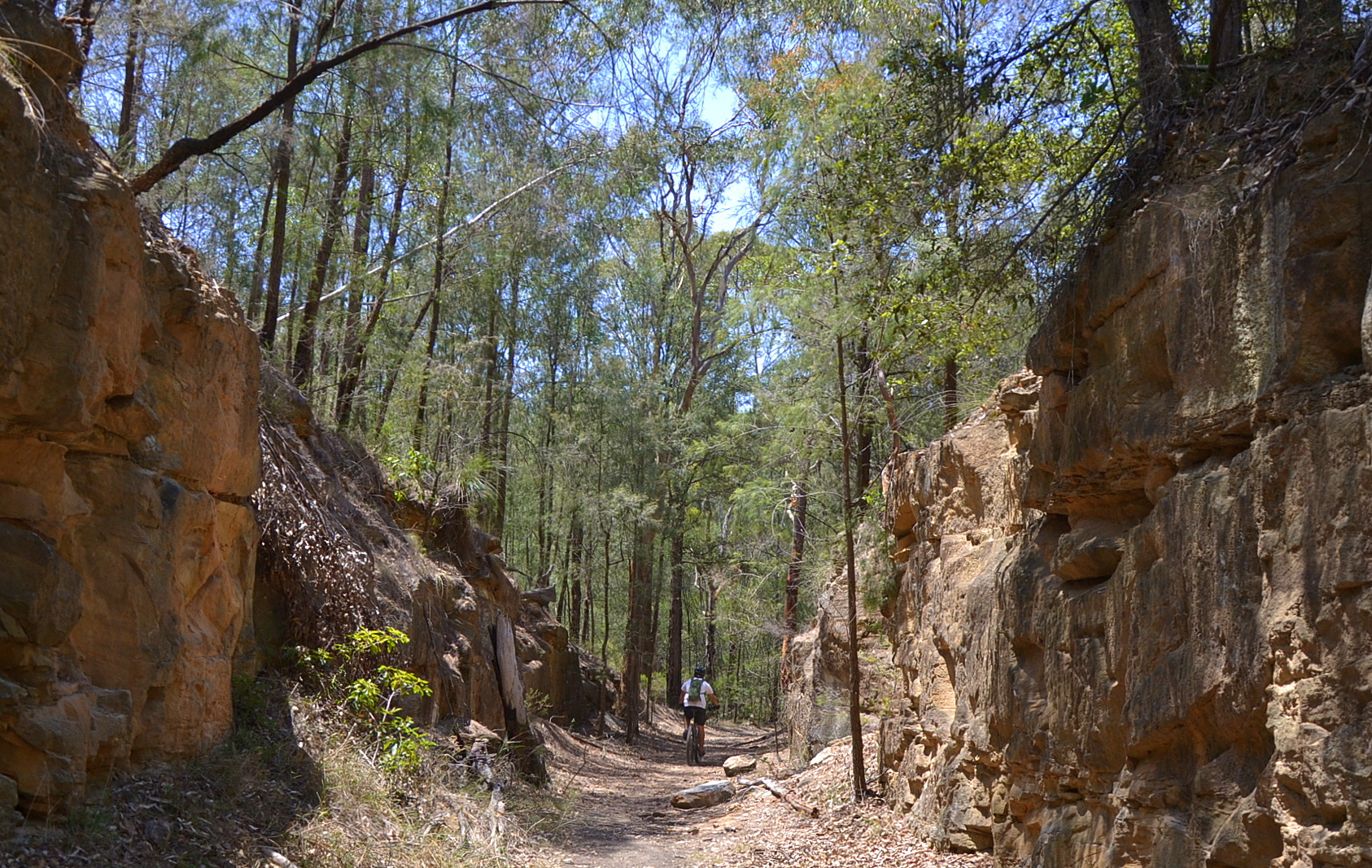
Cutting where the construction railway line went through Darks Common, The Spurline.

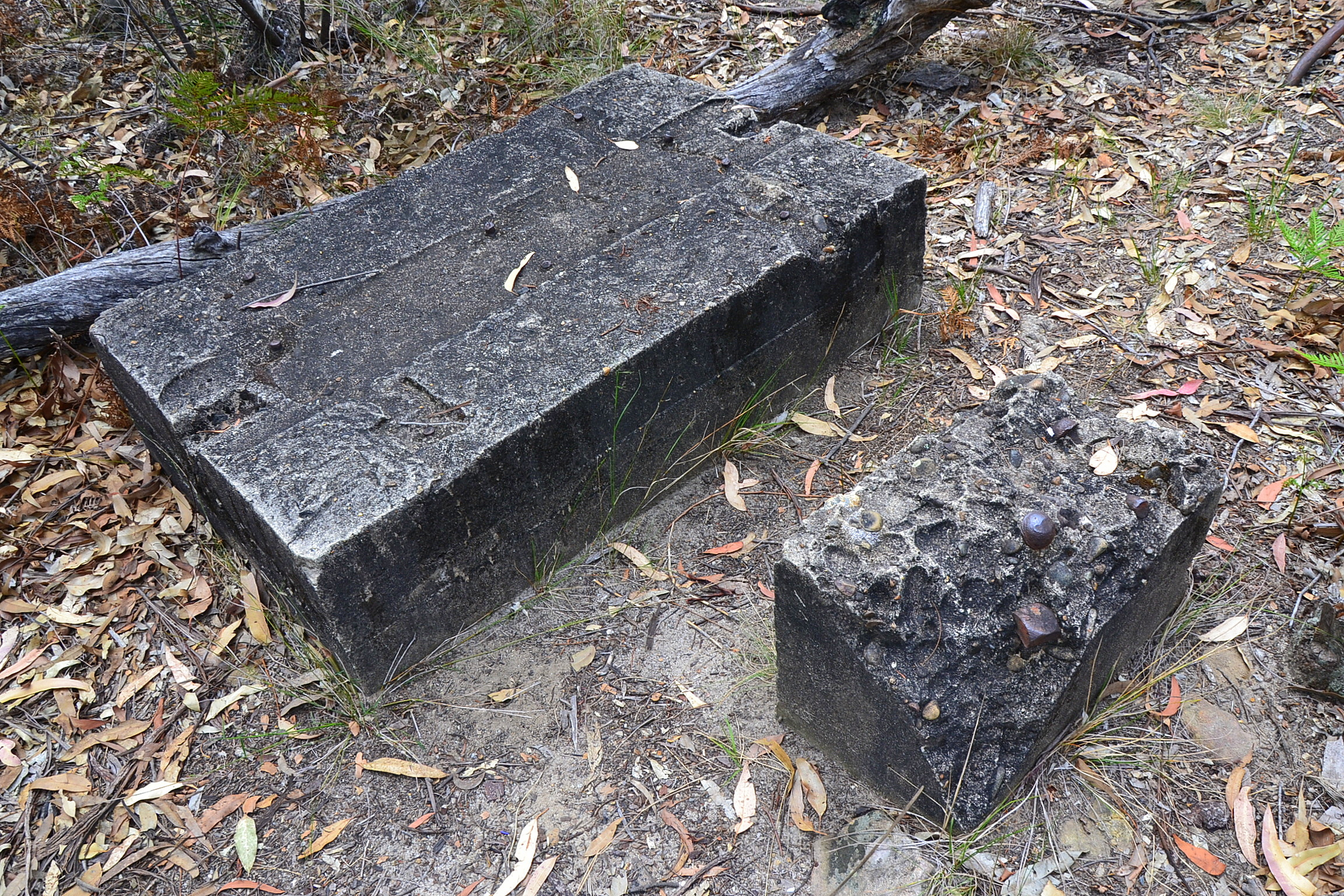
Remains of winding house base at the south end of the construction railway line.

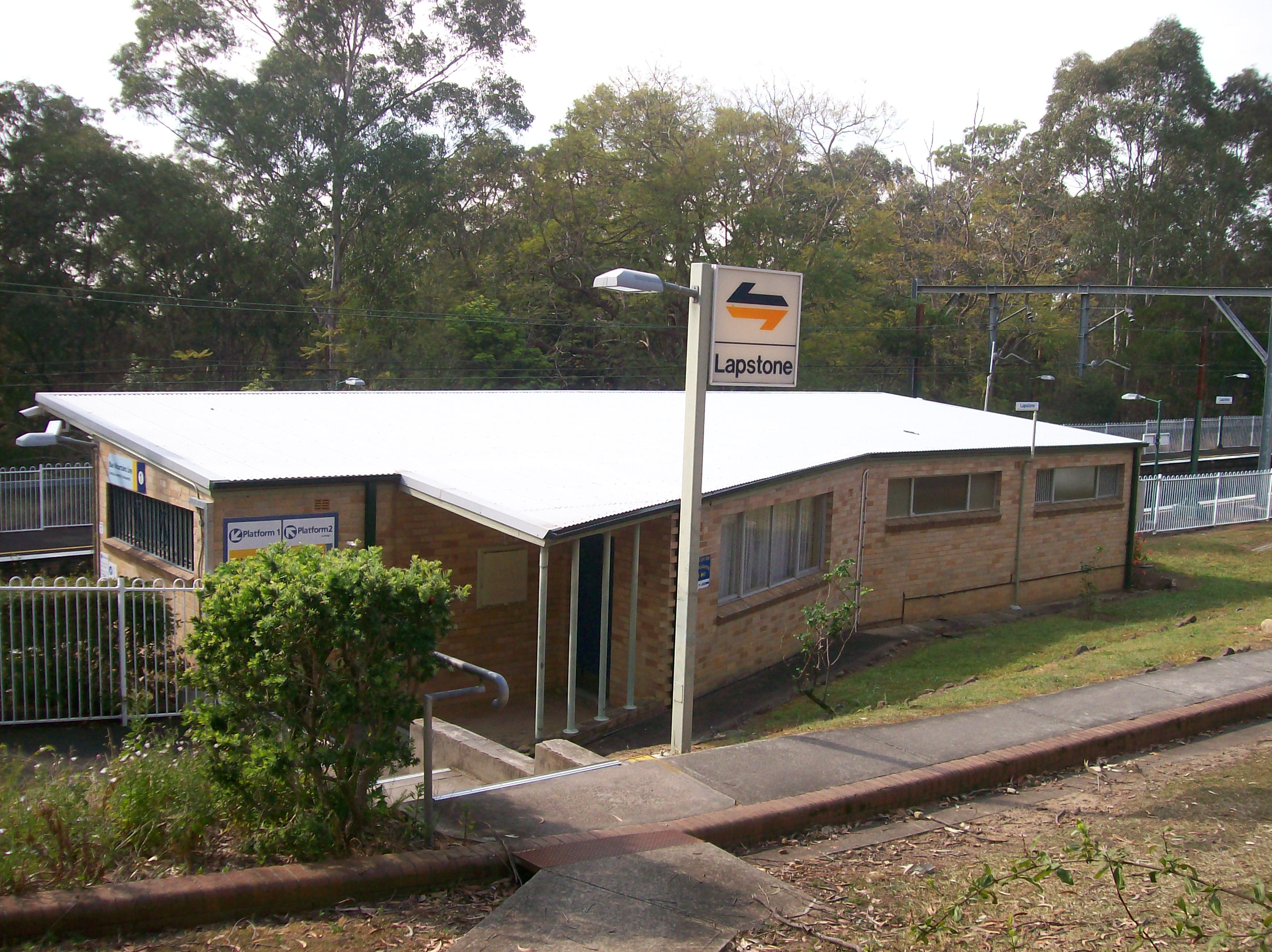
Lapstone railway station building.

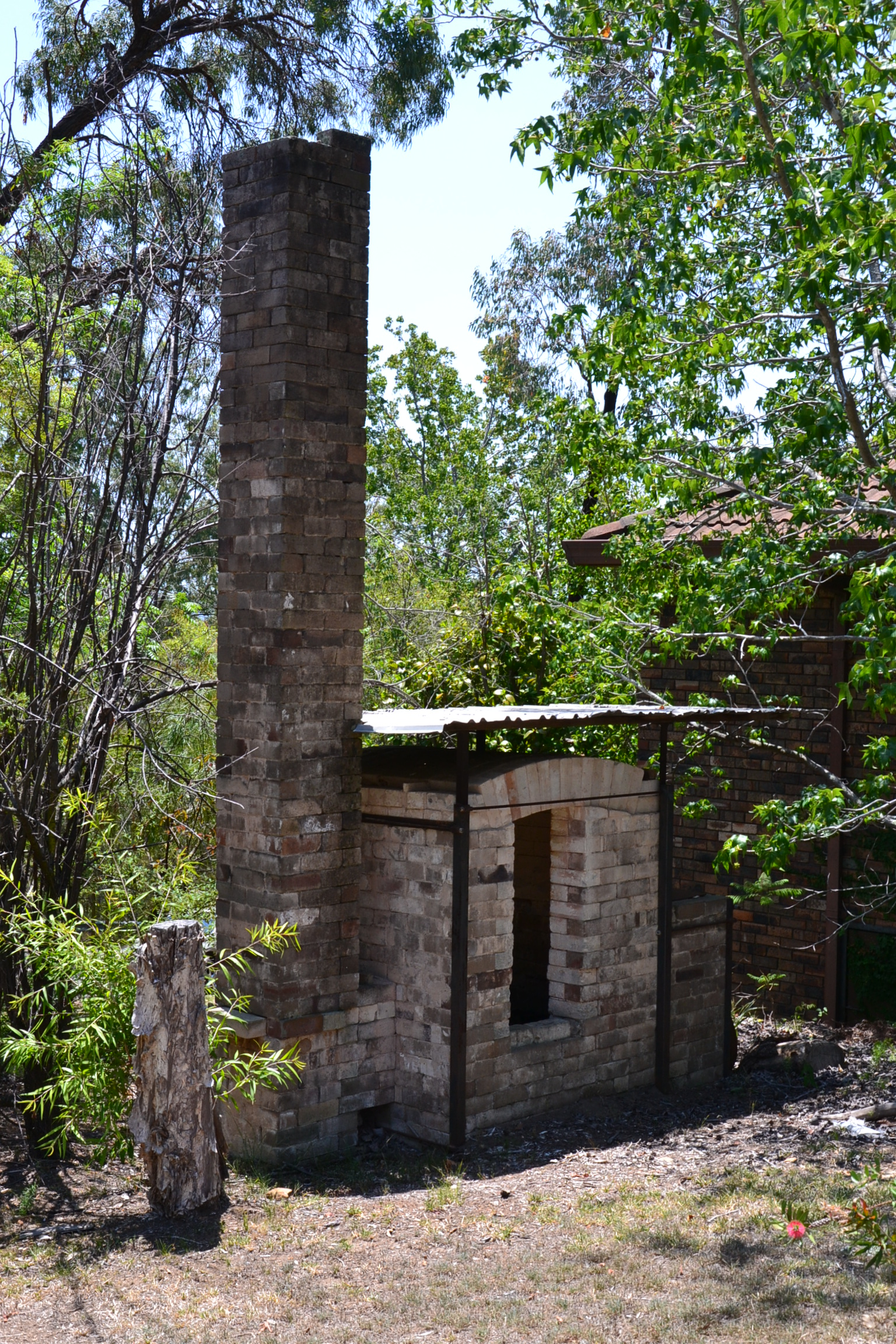
Old brick kiln.

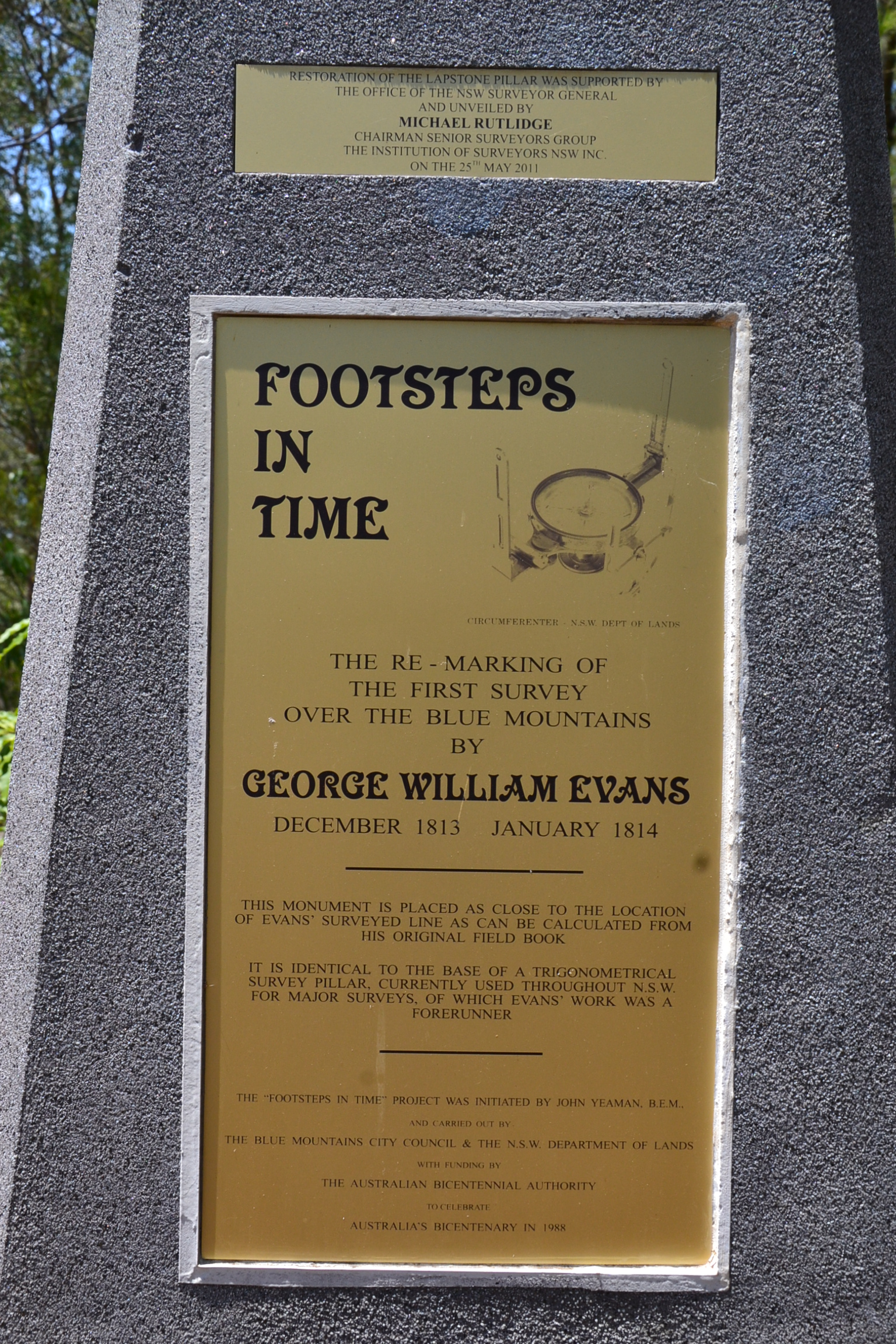
George Evans Memorial, Lapstone.

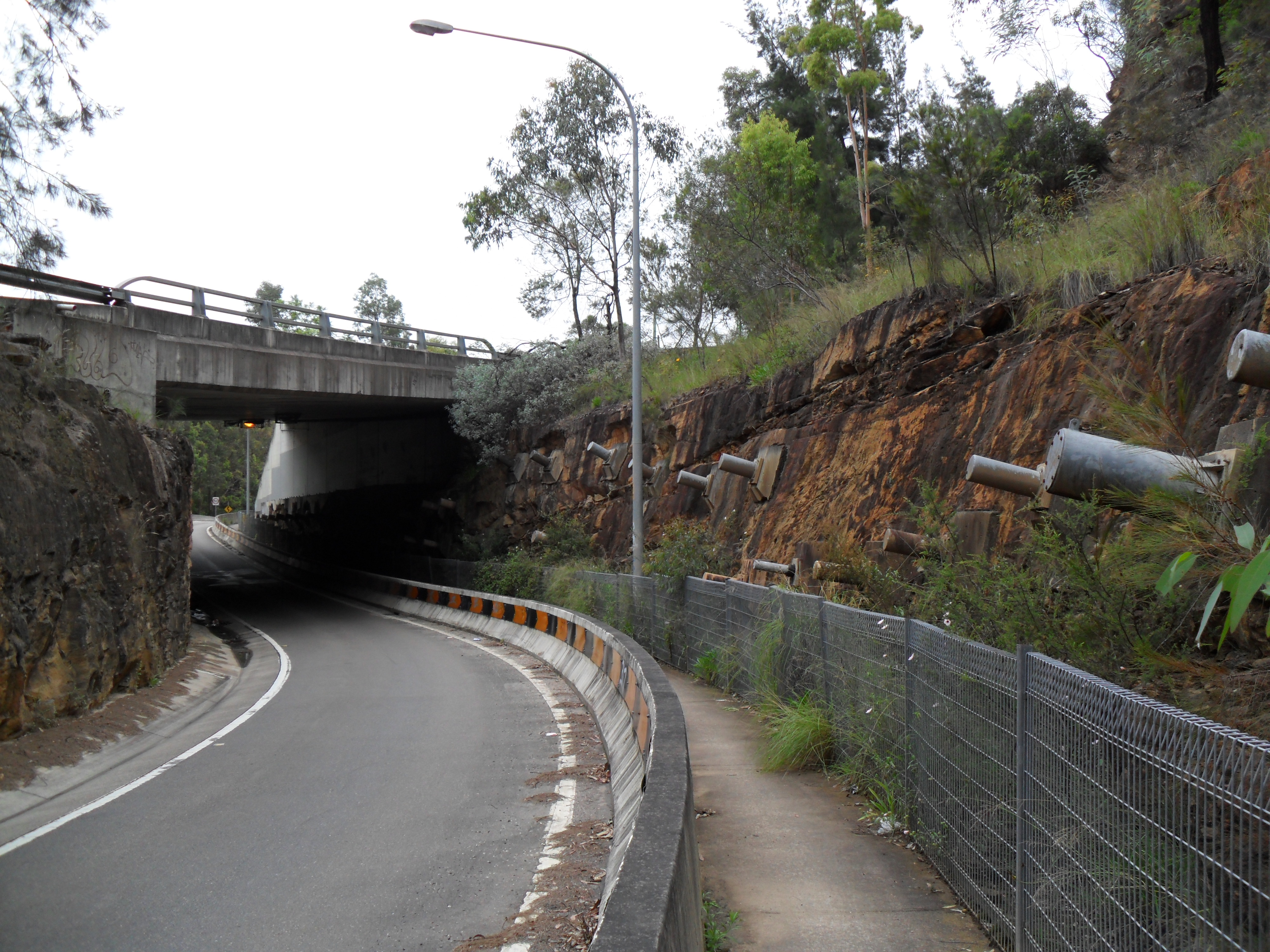
Governors Drive, where it joins the M4

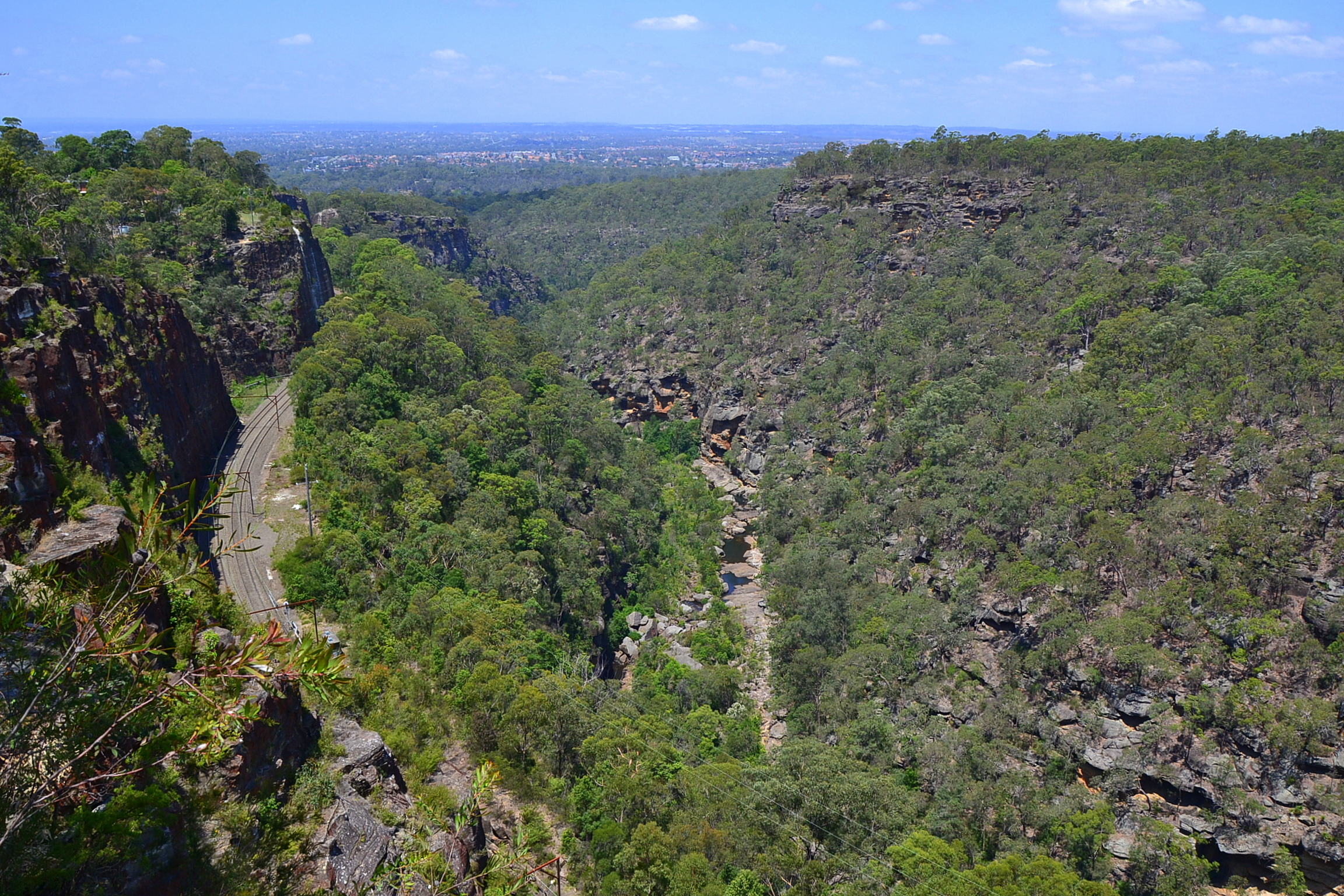
View from Bluff Lookout, Glenbrook Gorge.
