= Australian cricket team in New Zealand in 1886–87 =

International cricket tour

The Australian cricket team toured New Zealand in late November and early December 1886.

It was Australia's third tour of New Zealand, after tours in 1877-78 and 1880-81, and the shortest of the three. The Australians played five matches against provincial teams, four of which fielded 22 players (the other team, Canterbury, fielded 18) with the aim of providing more evenly-matched contests. As the matches were not 11-a-side they are not considered to have been first-class. The Australians won two of the matches and drew the other three.

== The Australian team ==
The Australians were returning from their 1886 tour of England, apart from George Bonnor and Tup Scott, who had remained in England. The 11 remaining players toured New Zealand, with the addition of Jim Phillips. Several of them were carrying injuries, and most of them were fatigued.

- Jack Blackham (captain)
- Tom Garrett (vice-captain)
- William Bruce
- Edwin Evans
- George Giffen
- Affie Jarvis
- Sammy Jones
- John McIlwraith
- Joey Palmer
- Jim Phillips
- Fred Spofforth
- Billy Trumble

Blackham and Spofforth had been on the previous two tours of New Zealand.

Giffen was sick throughout the tour and unable to play at all. He umpired in the match against Hawke's Bay. Blackham suffered a severe gash to his hand while batting against Canterbury, and was unable to play thereafter, so the Australians played with only 10 men for the last three matches, the local associations lending them substitute fieldsmen. Blackham umpired in the match against Auckland.

== The tour ==
Most of the Australians sailed from England on the Arawa, stopping only briefly in Hobart, where Phillips joined them, on the way to Port Chalmers. Spofforth and Garrett arrived on a slightly later ship, missing the first day of the Otago match.

- Otago v Australians, Carisbrook, Dunedin, 22, 23, 24 November 1886. Otago XXII 63 and 158; Australians 60 and 162 for 4. Australians won by six wickets.

Evans took 16 for 25 and 10 for 37, for match figures of 96.1–58–62–26 (four-ball overs). Trumble top-scored in each innings with 30 and 52. The Australians were dismissed at stumps on the first day, when Spofforth and Garrett had not yet arrived in Dunedin, so they batted only nine men in their first innings. Otago's top-scorer was Andrew Grieve, who made 33 in the second innings. The Australians considered Charlie Frith, who took 4 for 33 in their first innings, "the most troublesome bowler" they faced on this tour.

- Canterbury v Australians, Lancaster Park, Christchurch, 26, 27, 29 November 1886. Canterbury XVIII 178 and 139; Australians 99 and 82 for 5. Drawn.

The Australians, who had lost to Canterbury in 1877–78, again struggled. They found the bowling of David Dunlop difficult to handle, as he bowled his leg-breaks cleverly into a strong wind and took 5 for 50 and 3 for 17. Two Canterbury batsmen, the captain William Millton in the first innings and Edward Barnes in the second, scored 35, but the highest Australian innings was 32 by Blackham in the first innings. In the second innings a ball from Frederick Wilding struck Blackham on the first finger of his left hand, opening a gash an inch and a half long and putting him out of action for the rest of the tour.

- Wellington v Australians, Basin Reserve, Wellington, 1, 2, 3 December 1886. Wellington XXII 182 and 41 for 4; Australians 475. Drawn.

The Australians' total of 475 set a record for the highest total in any match in New Zealand. It occupied 323.2 four-ball overs. Jones (159 in five and a half hours) and Palmer (76) put on 202 for the first wicket.

- Hawke's Bay v Australians, Napier Recreation Ground, Napier, 4 December 1886. Hawke's Bay XXII 92; Australians 115. Australians won by 23 runs.

Palmer took 15 for 47 off 27 four-ball overs, bowling unchanged through the Hawke's Bay innings. Garrett, with 31, was the only batsman on either side to reach 20. For Hawke's Bay, Charles Edwards took 6 for 39.

- Auckland v Australians, Auckland Domain, Auckland, 6, 7, 8 December 1886. Australians 104 and 225; Auckland XXII 114 and 44 for 15. Drawn.

The Auckland batsman Dan Lynch, who had bowled so effectively against the Australians on their previous two tours, scored 46 in Auckland's first innings. It was the highest score by any New Zealand batsman against the Australians on their first three tours of New Zealand. After taking figures of 57–32–41–12 in Auckland's first innings, Palmer made 72 in Australia's second innings, which lasted 212 overs; the Auckland bowler Edward Mills had figures of 59–32–53–7. An extra day was added, but the slowness of the match prevented a result: off 462.3 four-ball overs only 487 runs were scored.

The Australians sailed for Sydney on the Mararoa shortly after seven o'clock at the end of the third day's play.

== Leading players ==
Jones was the highest scorer, with 280 runs at an average of 35.00; Trumble scored 218 at 27.25. Palmer was the leading wicket-taker, with 53 wickets at an average of 4.98; Evans took 34 at 3.23. Lynch's 46 for Auckland was the highest score by a New Zealander, and his team-mate Mills's 7 for 53 were the best figures. The New Zealand cricket historian Tom Reese wrote in 1927 that Jarvis's keeping was "the chief feature of the tour ... absolutely brilliant throughout, and it is generally considered that the best wicket-keeping ever seen in New Zealand was displayed by Jarvis on this tour".
