= Daniel Lynch =

Daniel Lynch may refer to:

== Sportspeople ==
- Daniel Lynch (basketball) (1916–1981), athletic director and basketball coach at St. Francis College
- Dan Lynch (American football) (born 1962), American college football player and venture capitalist
- Dan Lynch (cricketer) (1854–1920), New Zealand cricketer
- Daniel Lynch IV (born 1996), American baseball pitcher
- Danny Lynch (baseball) (1926–1978), American baseball second baseman

== Others ==
- Daniel C. Lynch (1941–2024), American computer network engineer
- Dan Lynch (politician) (1929–2026), American politician, member of the Nebraska Legislature
- Daniel Lynch, convicted for his role in the acid attack on English writer Katie Piper
- Danny Lynch, character in Tara Road
