= Nepean High School =

Nepean High School may refer to:

- Nepean High School (Ottawa), Canada
- Nepean Creative and Performing Arts High School, Penrith, Australia (formerly known as Nepean High School)
