= Emu Plains =

- Suburb
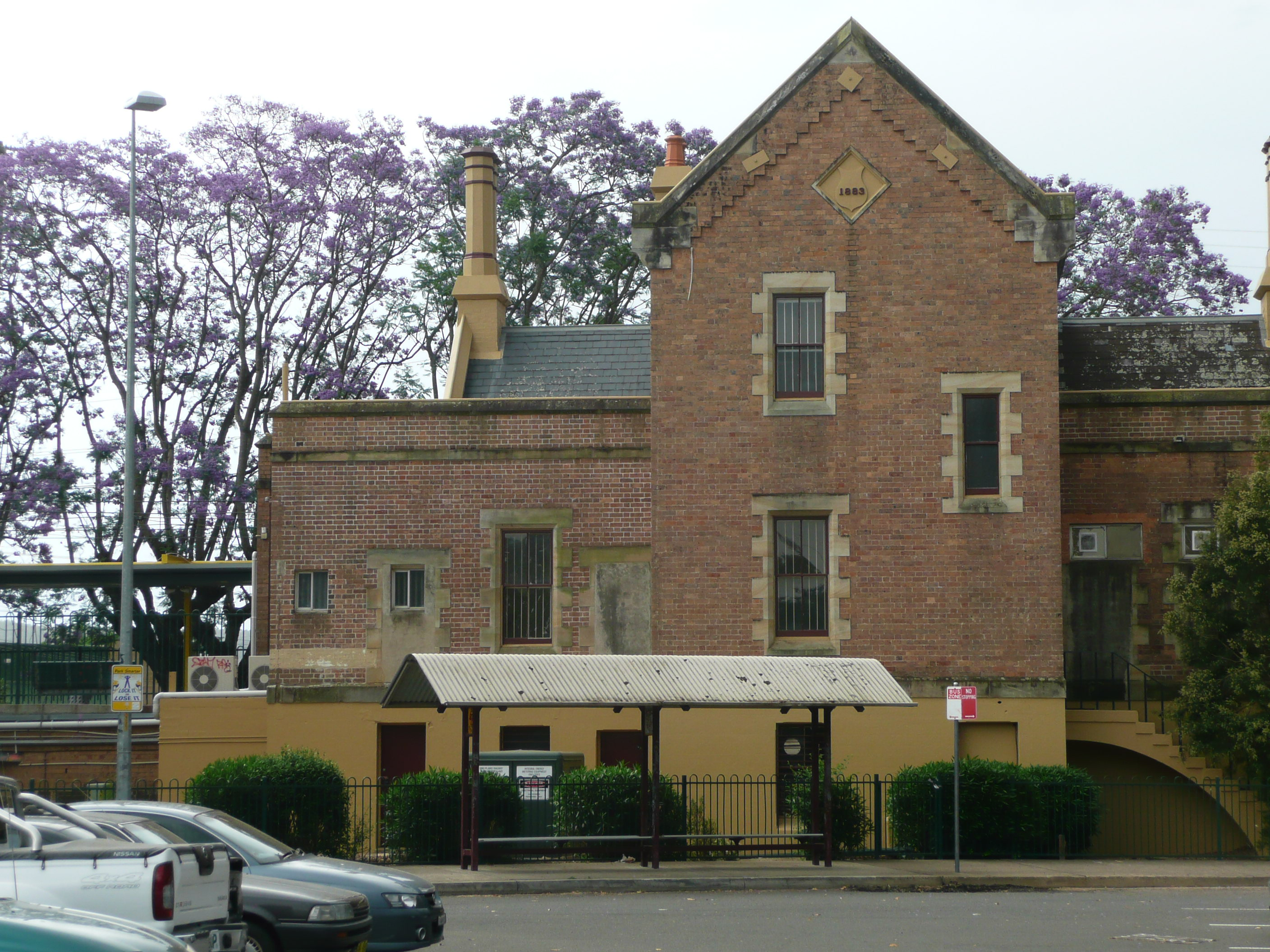
- Emu Plains Railway Station

- Interactive map of Emu Plains
- Country: Australia
- State: New South Wales
- City: Sydney
- LGA: City of Penrith
- Location: 58 km (36 mi) west of Sydney CBD; 47 km (29 mi) east of Katoomba
- Established: 1814

Government
  - State electorate: Penrith
  - Federal division: Macquarie

Area
  - Total: 7.92 km^{2} (3.06 sq mi)
- Elevation: 27 m (89 ft)

Population
  - Total: 8,126 (2021 census)
  - Density: 1,026.0/km^{2} (2,657.4/sq mi)
- Postcode: 2750
Suburbs around Emu Plains
Emu Heights	Castlereagh	Penrith
Glenbrook	Emu Plains	Jamisontown
Glenbrook	Leonay	Regentville

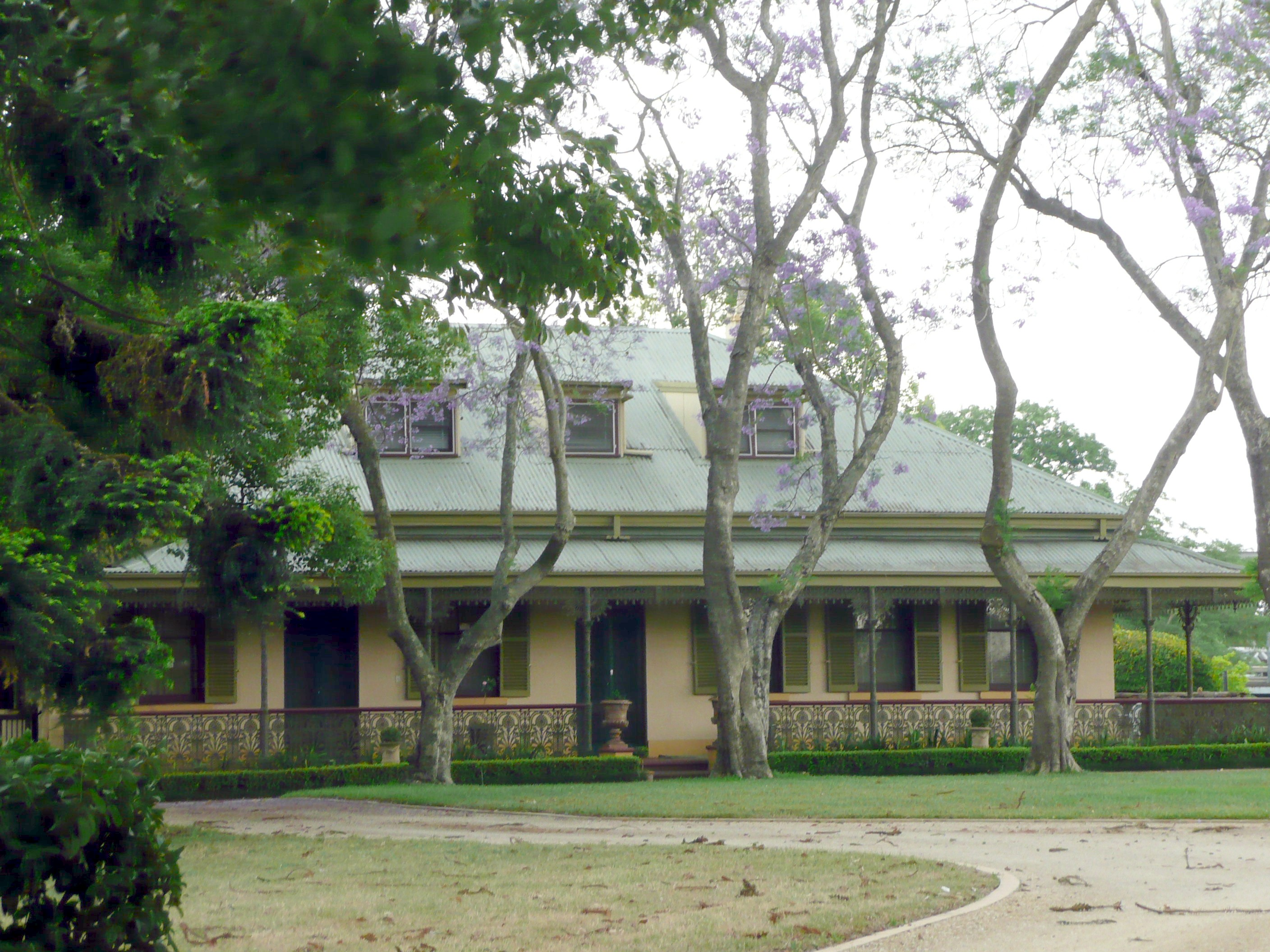
Emu Hall

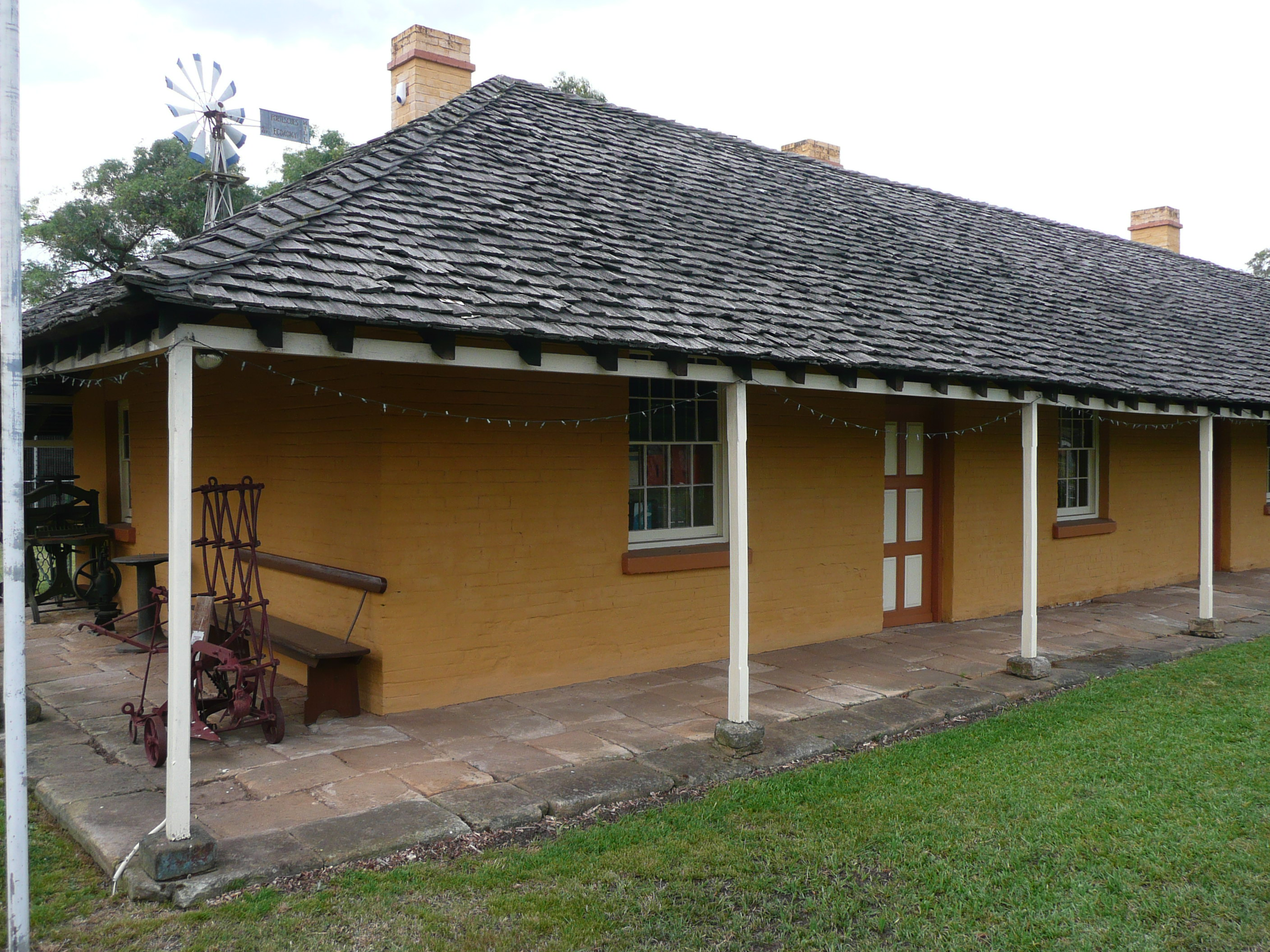
Former Arms of Australia Inn

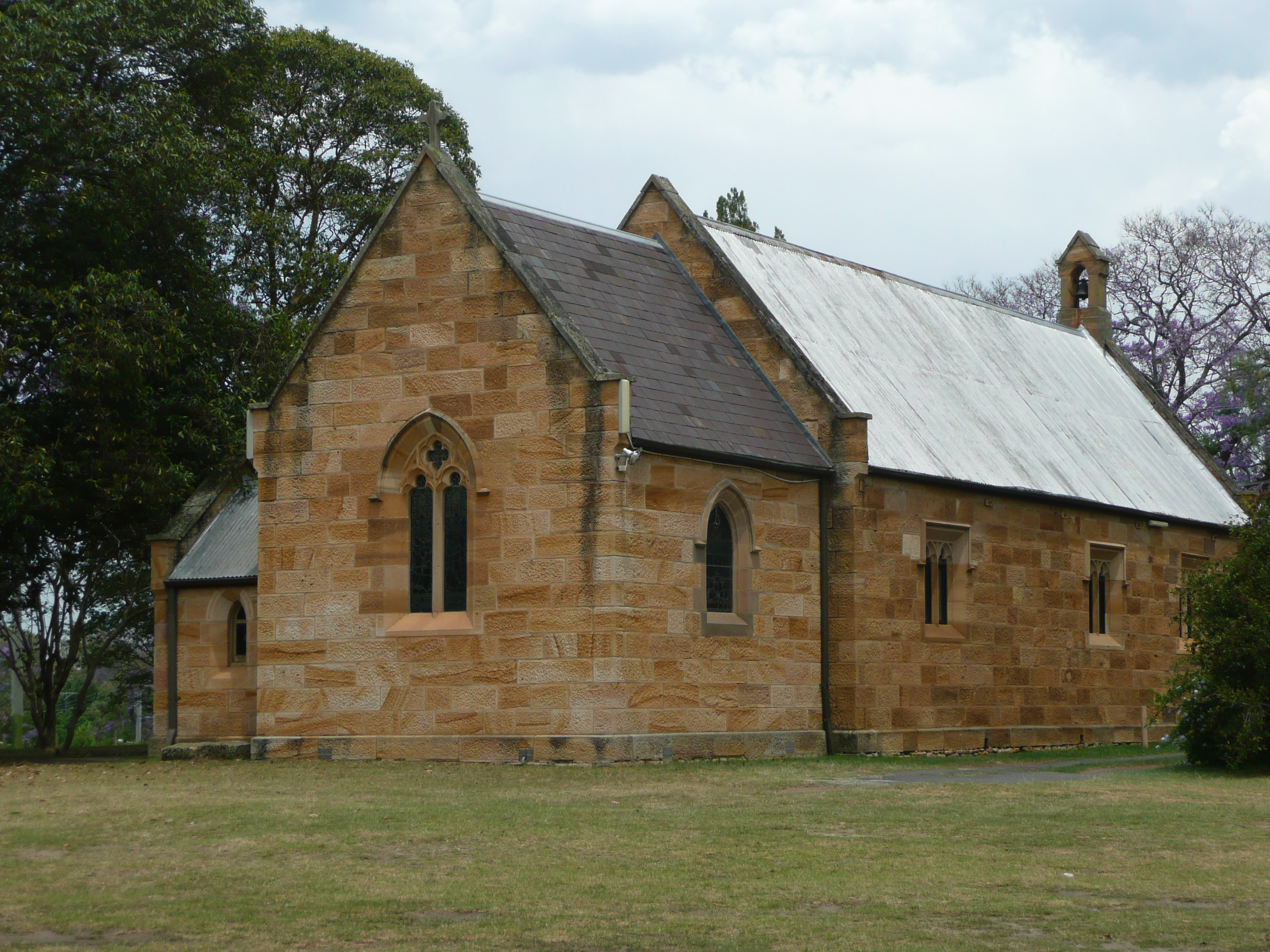
St Paul's Anglican Church

Emu Plains is a suburb of Sydney in the state of New South Wales, Australia. It is 58 kilometres (36 mi) west of the Sydney central business district, in the local government area of the City of Penrith and is part of the Greater Western Sydney region.

Emu Plains is on the western side of the Nepean River, located at the foot of the Blue Mountains.

== History ==
=== Aboriginal culture ===
Prior to European settlement, what is now the suburb of Emu Plains was located on the border of the Western Sydney-based Dharug people and the Southern Highlands-based Gandangara people, whose land extended into the Blue Mountains. The local Dharug people were known as the Mulgoa. They lived a hunter-gatherer lifestyle governed by traditional laws, which had their origins in the Dreamtime. They lived in huts made of bark called 'gunyahs', hunted kangaroos and emus for meat, and gathered yams, berries, and other native plants.

=== European settlement ===
The first British colonizers to visit the area surveyed Emu Plains in August 1790 led by Watkin Tench. They named it Emu Island due to the emus they sighted there, and in the mistaken belief that the land was actually an island, which was the result of the occasionally flooded river giving the appearance of it being an island. When Governor Lachlan Macquarie toured the area on the 15th of April 1814, he had realized the misconception and was the first to use the name Emu Plains.

William Cox started building a road over the Blue Mountains from Emu Plains on 18 July 1814.

A government farm using convict labor was established in 1813 with 1,326 convicts growing local agriculture. It closed in 1833. The land was sold to establish the village of Emu Plains.

Emu Ferry Post Office opened on 1 April 1863 and was renamed Emu Plains in 1882.

In the 1880s the Emu and Prospect Gravel and Road Metal company began removing stones from the Nepean River. They were turned into concrete and road-base. A railway siding, which was to be expanded into a short branch, was first laid in from the Main Western Line at Emu Plains in 1884. Railway operations, which included the line's own locomotives, continued until 1967 when only a siding, shunted by government trains, remained. All railway operations ceased in 1993.

Emu Plains has a number of landmark buildings:

- The railway station is a notable building of brick and sandstone, with Tudor chimneys, built in 1883. It is unusual for a railway station because it has two stories; it has a Local Government Heritage Listing.
- Emu Hall is a substantial home by the Nepean River. It was built in 1851 by Toby Ryan (1818–1899), who occupied the house until 1875. The house has a Local Government Heritage Listing.
- St Paul's Anglican Church was built in 1848 and has a cemetery.
- The former Arms of Australia Inn was built in 1833 to service the roads through the area. It has been restored by the Nepean District Historical Society with government funding and is used as a historical museum. It has a Local Government Heritage Listing.
- At the corner of Russell Street and the Great Western Highway is the original Emu Plains post office, a sandstone Gothic cottage.

== Commercial area ==
The main commercial centre is Lennox Village (formerly Centro Lennox), named after David Lennox. The shopping centre features Aldi and Woolworths.

There is a concrete plant located in town in the industrial area, this plant is owned and operated by Holcim Australia, the plant was formerly owned by PF Concrete and currently services the western suburbs region including Penrith six days a week.

== Transport ==
Emu Plains railway station is situated on the Main Western railway line. It is the last station on the suburban line with Lapstone, the next station to the west, considered part of the Intercity network. While a long distance from Sydney city, there are many express services from Emu Plains to the city. Emu Plains is also serviced by Blue Mountains Transit.

Emu Plains can easily be accessed from Penrith via the Great Western Highway. Access from further east is best obtained by the M4 Western Motorway. If travelling east from the Blue Mountains, access is best obtained by the Great Western Highway.

== Education ==
The local government schools are Emu Plains Public School and the Nepean Creative and Performing Arts High School. There is also a Catholic primary school, Our Lady of the Way, and high school, Penola Catholic College.

== Cultural attractions ==
Penrith Regional Gallery & The Lewers Bequest is an art gallery established at the former property of artists Gerald and Margo Lewers. It is at 86 River Road, Emu Plains. The property was bought by the Lewers in the 1940s, and in 1950 it became their permanent home and studio. Gerald died in 1962, and Margo continued to live and work there until her death in 1978. In 1980 the Lewers' daughters donated the site, buildings, gardens and a substantial collection of art to Penrith City Council. The gallery was opened in August 1981 by the New South Wales Premier, Neville Wran. Every year tens of thousands of visitors inspect the gallery's exhibitions and use the gardens and café.

== Heritage listings ==
Emu Plains has a number of heritage-listed sites, including:

- Main Western railway: Emu Plains railway station
- Arms of Australia Inn (1826)
- St Paul's Anglican Church (1848)
- Police Cottage (1908)

== Churches ==
St Paul's Church School opened in 1848, and the church building consecrated in 1872. The church is now part of the Emu Plains Anglican Church.

Our Lady of the Way is a part of the Catholic Diocese of Parramatta in Western Sydney. The church and school buildings were built in about 1860 on a government land grant.

Emu Plains Community Baptist Church began ministering in August 2001. The services were initially held in the Emu Plains Community Centre, until the moved to Melrose Hall in 2005.

== Population ==
=== Demographics ===
At the 2021 census, there were 8,126 residents in Emu Plains. Aboriginal and Torres Strait Islander people made up 4.0% of the population. 81.3% of residents were born in Australia. The next most common countries of birth were England 4.5%, New Zealand 1.6%, Ireland 0.6%, Philippines 0.6%, and Scotland 0.5%. The top responses for religious affiliation were No Religion 31.7%, Catholic 26.8% and Anglican 19.2%. The top ancestries were Australian 41.6%, English 40.0%, Irish 13.7%, Scottish 9.9% and German 3.8%. 89.0% of people spoke only English at home. Other languages spoken at home included Greek 0.7%, Arabic 0.4%, Hindi 0.3%, Mandarin 0.3% and Croatian 0.3%.

=== Notable residents ===
- Edwin Evans (1849–1921), Australian cricketer
- William Carter (1902–1952), Australian silent film actor, lived at Westbank House, a substantial estate and orchard now subdivided and facing Nepean Street
- Jeremy Crawshaw, American football player
- Sir Francis Forbes (1784–1841), chief justice of New South Wales, who built the house Edinglassie at Emu Plains
- Gerald Lewers (1905–1962) and Margo Lewers (1908–1978), artists who donated their house as the Penrith Regional Art Gallery
- Toby Ryan (1818–1899), early landholder, sportsman and politician

== Governance ==
Until 1963, Emu Plains was part of Blue Mountains City Council but was then transferred to Penrith City Council, where it is currently split between the North and South Wards. At the state level, it is part of the Electoral district of Penrith, represented by Karen McKeown of the Australian Labor Party. Federally, it is part of the Division of Lindsay, represented by Liberal Melissa McIntosh.

== See also ==
- Emu Plains Correctional Centre
- Emu Plains JRLFC
