= Arthur J. Hand =

Founder of Lapstone, Australia

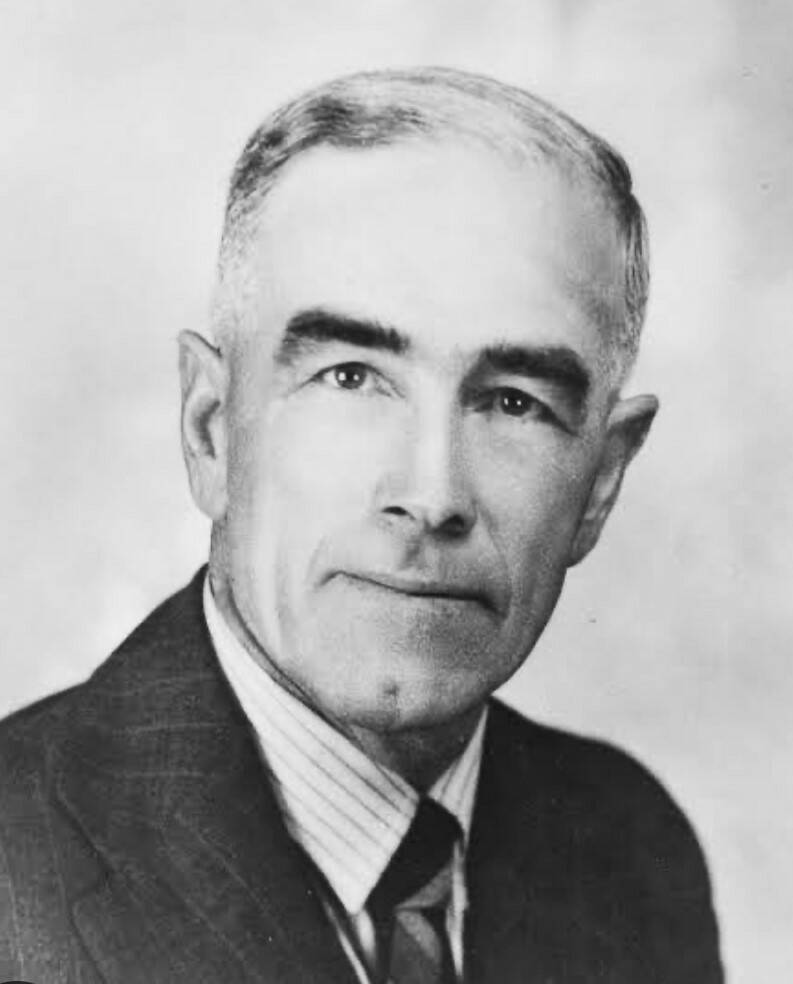
- Born: 11 September 1888; Penrith, New South Wales
- Died: 17 March 1968 (aged 79); Cronulla, New South Wales
- Education: Sydney Boys High School
- Occupations: Timber merchant; local-government councillor; property developer
- Years active: 1912–1964
- Known for: Founder of Lapstone, funded the creation of Lapstone railway station
- Political party: United Australia Party
- Spouse: Elsie Marion Nicholls (m.1912)
- Children: 4

Arthur J. Hand (11 September 1888 - 17 March 1968) was a Sutherland Shire councillor, Blue Mountains City Council Alderman and timber merchant best known for being the developer and founder of the town of Lapstone in the Blue Mountains, as well as building Lapstone Train Station.

== Early life ==
Arthur Hand was born in Penrith as the third eldest of seven children to English immigrant John Henry Hand and Emma Matilda Fragar. The family lived in Warwick Street, 'Hornseywood Estate'.

=== Schooling ===
Arthur attended Penrith Primary and then Sydney Boys Public High School. Although primary schooling was available to most children in the early 1900s, secondary schools were few in number and Sydney Boys Public High School was the only state school in the Sydney area. Students needed to demonstrate academic aptitude to attend secondary school. Arthur studied five subjects (English, French, Latin, Arithmetic, Algebra) for his Junior Public Examinations in 1905, aged 17.

=== Life after school ===
After Arthur and his younger brother John finished at Sydney Boys High School, the Hand family moved to Wyong where Arthur’s father worked for the railways. Arthur’s early working days were spent with a branch of the timber merchants Tanner and Middleton in Newcastle, which is where Arthur met his future wife, Elsie Marion Nicholls.

Elsie lived at Toronto on Lake Macquarie. Arthur and Elsie were married on 19 October 1912 at Newcastle Cathedral. Over the next 15 years, Elsie and Arthur had four children: John Arthur (Jack), Constance Eirene (Jill), Margaret June (Mardie), and Geoffrey Charles. Early in their married life, Elsie and Arthur moved to Waratah St, Cronulla.

His father died in 1930. His mother was a Red Cross volunteer during World War I. Prior to being a Councillor he founded Arthur J. Hand Pty. Ltd. A timber merchant company.

== Career ==
=== Timber Merchant ===
In 1913 Arthur was appointed by Tanner and Middleton to manage a new branch of their timber business in Cronulla on a site which eventually became the southern end of Cronulla Railway Station.

By the mid-1920s Arthur established his own timberyard, initially next to Sutherland Railway Station and finally next to the family’s residence, ‘Kianga, on Princes Highway, Sutherland.

=== Sutherland Shire Councillor ===
He was elected a Sutherland Shire Councillor in 1917, he was re-elected every 3 years until retiring in 1932, serving 15 years in total. He was known for his work on Tom Uglys Bridge.

Arthur is recognised for the following achievements while an alderman at Sutherland Shire:

• preparing a town planning scheme for Cronulla in 1919

• designing a mechanical checking device for toll collecting on Tom Uglys Bridge – this was trialled but later removed organising a group of six men to drive the first motor vehicle from Cronulla to Kurnell in July 1927 taking two hours

• becoming the first Shire President to be appointed to National Park Trust (1929)

• being one of nine aldermen who resigned in August 1929 over the ‘Affair of the Bridge Passes’ – all nine were re-elected in October 1929

• moving the motion for the NSW government to build Georges River Bridge

• being elected VP of Sutherland Shires Parks and Playground Association (1937)

• being elected president of the Werriwa Federal division of the United Australia Party (1937)

=== Blue Mountains ===
After the second world war he and his wife, Elsie, moved to Blackheath to play golf as part of retirement. In 1953 he was elected an Alderman of Blue Mountains Council.

Blackheath Community Centre development

Arthur Hand’s role as an alderman at Blue Mountains City Council is not well documented, other than his involvement in development of the Blackheath Community Centre. While he was President of the Blackheath Rotary Club, he was responsible for a hall addition to the School of Arts building in 1951–1952. The School of Arts ceased to exist in 1954 with the transfer of ownership to the Blue Mountains Council and the building then being known as the Blackheath Community Centre.

Christmas tree fundraising

During a period when there was limited opportunity to raise funds from the local community, Rotary sought ideas for untapped revenue sources including the sale of Christmas trees. Arthur Hand is recognised for devising the plan to grow Pinus insignis (Christmas trees) in Blackheath (Lake Medlow Greaves Creek) Catchment Area, most likely in the mid-1950s, as a way of raising funds for the local Rotary club. With Arthur’s understanding of timber and his business acumen, the club was able to raise about £1,000 a year. The intention was that the plantation would provide not only Christmas trees but millable logs after 20 years, and then for the next 20 years. With advice from forestry representatives, the club harvested at least 2,500 Christmas trees from the 8–10 acres planted annually. Trees were initially transported to Sydney, but in later years sales were made direct from the forest. Growing the trees on council land, Rotary negotiated the revenue distribution to be proportioned between council and the club on a 2:1 basis, until Council decided to take over complete management of the project in the 1960s.

== Lapstone ==
On the 2nd of December 1954 Hand purchased land in the Lower Blue Mountains, named Stephens Paddock, that he named as the town of Lapstone for £3,675. He would develop the land and would later build the Lapstone Railway Station, after promising it to potential buyers. It is one of the only privately funded Railway stations in New South Wales still operating.

When Hand advertised the Lapstone blocks of land for sale in 1955, there were references to a new Lapstone railway station that would soon be built. After negotiations with the Railways Department failed, Hand decided to honour his commitment to residents to build the station and did so at his cost of £32,566.

The station was described in the Railway Transportation magazine (13 August 1964, pp. 32–3, vol. 13, no. 8): The station’s design was modern for its time. A brick structure was built on the platform nearest the estate, featuring a station master’s office with a booking window and parcels counter. The large waiting room was distinct, with full-height glass panels replacing the traditional front wall, providing an open view of the platform and tracks, and contrasting the darker interiors of other stations. Inside, the ladies bathroom adjoined the waiting room, while a storeroom and a gents washroom occupied the rest of the building. The structure used Kromotex face bricks, with interior walls painted in soft pastel colours. A footbridge connected the two platforms, offering access to the nearby commuter car park. The platforms, initially brick-faced with an earth fill and gravel surface, were completed in time for the station’s opening. With its inauguration, train timetables were adjusted to accommodate interurban trains stopping in Lapstone in both directions.

Physical work commenced in January 1963. The station buildings were erected by a local contractor R. & R.M. McGraw Pty Ltd. Alderman Athur Hand supervised construction. The opening, without any ceremony, occurred on 24 February 1964.

He gave Lapstone two of its most distinctive features, Red Brick Gutters and underground Power lines. Which have been described as "Visionary for the time."

== Death ==
Arthur J. Hand died in 1968.
