= Lapstone Oval =

Sports precinct in Lapstone, New South Wales

- Interactive map of Lapstone Oval
- Location: Lapstone, New South Wales
- Coordinates: 33°46′16″S 150°38′8″E
- Surface: Rugby Field: Grass; Netball Courts: Grass and asphalt
- Scoreboard: Currently no fixed scoreboard

Lapstone Oval is a sports precinct in Lapstone, New South Wales. It supports sport all year round. The name Lapstone Oval covers all of the 3 different types of sporting facilities and not just the rugby field as is thought by some people.

== Facilities ==
There are a few features at Lapstone Oval.

- A rugby union field
- 11 netball courts (9 are asphalt and the other 2 are grass)
- 2 tennis courts which overlook the rugby field and half of the grass netball courts
- A small play area for younger children

During the winter months there is a canteen running at the bottom of the netball club-house and a BBQ on the grass next to it. A mobile coffee van turns up each week as well.

== Home teams ==
Several teams call the oval their home ground.

=== Netball ===
Lapstone Oval is not a home ground to any of the netball teams in the Blue Mountains Netball Association (BMNA) as they all play there every week. The Blue Mountains Netball Representatives train at the oval.

=== Cricket ===
Although some teams from Glenbrook-Blaxland Cricket Club (GBCC) play some of their games at Lapstone the club doesn't have a single home ground. They also play in:

- Glenbrook
- Blaxland

=== Rugby Union ===
The Blue Mountains Rugby Club (also known as Blueys or Blue Tongues) call the oval home. It is where they play their home games and they also have a club house at the ground.

== Winter sport ==
In winter 2 sports are played at Lapstone Oval. They are:

- Rugby Union
- Netball

== Summer sport ==
During the summer an artificial cricket pitch is placed into the centre of the rugby field. In the past few summers the rugby goal posts have been taken out.
