= David Dunlop (cricketer) =

New Zealand cricketer

Personal information
- Full name: David Edward Logan Dunlop
- Born: 8 May 1855; Blythswood, Glasgow, Scotland
- Died: 7 January 1898 (aged 42); Nannine, Western Australia
- Bowling: Right-arm leg-spin

Domestic team information
- Years: Team
- 1883-84 to 1887-88: Canterbury

Career statistics
Competition	First-class
Matches	10
Runs scored	132
Batting average	9.42
100s/50s	0/0
Top score	23
Balls bowled
Wickets	74
Bowling average	9.66
5 wickets in innings	8
10 wickets in match	2
Best bowling	6/7
Catches/stumpings	6/0
- Source: Cricinfo, 3 March 2019

David Edward Logan Dunlop (8 May 1855 – 7 January 1898) was a New Zealand cricketer who played ten first-class matches for Canterbury between 1884 and 1888.

== Life and career ==
Dunlop was born in Glasgow in Scotland and educated at Loretto School in Musselburgh, near Edinburgh. He went to Australia and lived in Melbourne before moving on to New Zealand.

A powerfully-built man, Dunlop was a leg-spinner who usually opened the bowling, and a middle-order batsman. In Canterbury's annual match against Otago in 1884-85 he took 5 for 69 and 5 for 44 and made 23 and 22 not out.

In November 1886 Dunlop was Canterbury's leading bowler against the touring Australians, taking 5 for 50 and 3 for 17 as the Australians struggled in a drawn match. In the first innings he bowled skilfully into a strong wind, varying his pace and moving the ball through the air to bowl all five of his victims, all of them Test players. Against Wellington a few weeks later he bowled unchanged throughout both innings to take 4 for 29 and 6 for 7 for match figures of 39–22–36–10 (five-ball overs).

Dunlop moved back to Australia in the early 1890s, working in the gold mines of the Murchison district of Western Australia. As the underground manager of the Champion Extended mine in Nannine in January 1898 he was investigating a malfunctioning pump 175 feet below the surface when part of the temporary bailing machinery fell on him and killed him.
