= Robert Lynch (Wellington cricketer) =

New Zealand cricketer

Personal information
- Full name: Robert Francis Lynch
- Born: 20 July 1856; Auckland, New Zealand
- Died: 19 August 1938 (aged 82); Auckland, New Zealand
- Relatives: Dan Lynch (brother)

Domestic team information
- Years: Team
- 1873/74–1883/84: Wellington
- Source: ESPNcricinfo, 15 June 2016

Robert Francis Lynch (20 July 1856 – 19 August 1938) was a New Zealand cricketer. He played five first-class matches for Wellington between the 1873–74 and 1883–84 seasons.
