= Edward Barnes (cricketer) =

New Zealand cricketer (1856–1897)

Personal information
- Full name: William Edward Parker Barnes
- Born: 23 December 1856; Kildare, Geelong, Colony of Victoria
- Died: 19 August 1897 (aged 40); Christchurch, New Zealand
- Nickname: Jum
- Height: 6 ft 3 in (1.91 m)

Domestic team information
- Years: Team
- 1882-83 to 1893-94: Canterbury

Career statistics
Competition	First-class
Matches	16
Runs scored	290
Batting average	12.08
100s/50s	0/0
Top score	49 not out
Balls bowled	649
Wickets	9
Bowling average	23.44
5 wickets in innings	0
10 wickets in match	0
Best bowling	2/43
Catches/stumpings	23/0
- Source: Cricinfo, 27 March 2019

William Edward Parker "Jum" Barnes (23 December 1856 – 19 August 1897) was a New Zealand cricketer who played 16 first-class matches for Canterbury between 1882 and 1894.

== Life and career ==
Born in Geelong in Australia, Barnes played cricket for the East Melbourne club and represented Victoria at Australian rules football. He went to Christchurch as an official with the Christchurch Exhibition of 1882 and stayed, working for the Lyttelton Times, where for some years he was a sports reporter. He played rugby union in New Zealand, and was noted for his weight and strength.

Barnes began playing cricket for Canterbury a few months after he arrived. His highest first-class score was 49 not out against Wellington in 1886–87, by far the highest score in a match in which 40 wickets fell for 309 runs. A few weeks earlier he had made 35, equal top-score in the match, when a Canterbury XVIII outplayed the touring Australians in a drawn match. He stood six feet three inches tall, and aside from his batting he was a useful bowler, an occasional wicket-keeper, and one of the outstanding slip fieldsmen in New Zealand.

In the last year of his life he suffered from severe jaundice, aggravated by heavy drinking. On the night before his death, his drinking companions in Christchurch had helped him to a shed and left him there asleep, covered with his coat. He was discovered unconscious the next morning and taken to hospital, but died shortly after being admitted.
