= Edwin Evans (cricketer) =

Australian cricketer

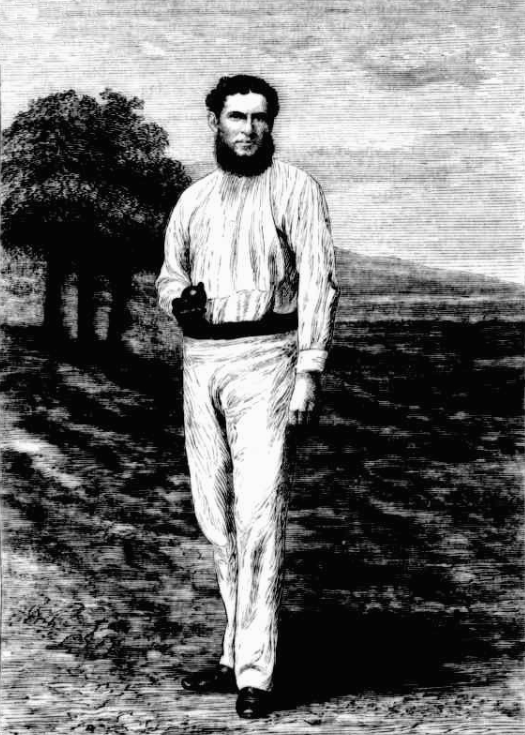

Personal information
- Born: 26 March 1849; Emu Plains, Colony Of New South Wales, Australia
- Died: 2 July 1921 (aged 72); Walgett, New South Wales, Australia
- Batting: Right-handed
- Bowling: Right-arm slow

International information
- National side: Australia (1881–1886)
- Test debut (cap 26): 31 December 1881 v England
- Last Test: 12 August 1886 v England

Domestic team information
- Years: Team
- 1874/75–1887/88: New South Wales

Career statistics
Competition	Test	First-class
Matches	6	65
Runs scored	82	1,006
Batting average	10.25	12.26
100s/50s	0/0	0/2
Top score	33	74*
Balls bowled	1237	11,603
Wickets	7	201
Bowling average	47.42	16.69
5 wickets in innings	0	18
10 wickets in match	0	4
Best bowling	3/64	7/16
Catches/stumpings	5/–	61/–
- Source: CricketArchive, 12 October 2022

Edwin "Ted" Evans (26 March 1849 – 2 July 1921) was an Australian cricketer who played in six Test matches between 1881 and 1886.

Born in Emu Plains, New South Wales, and educated at Newington College in Sydney from 1865 to 1866, Evans was an off spinner with an ability to consistently land the ball wherever he wanted to. He was successful for New South Wales in first-class cricket from 1875 to 1887. He toured England and New Zealand with the Australian team in 1886. His best first-class bowling figures were 7 for 16 when New South Wales dismissed Victoria for 34 in December 1875.

In 1900, Tom Horan as "Felix" wrote in The Australasian: "Alfred Shaw used always refer to Ted Evans as the 'most genuine cricketer' he'd ever met...Lord Harris's comment in 1878 was that he had never played against a finer bowler than Evans. As a fieldsman he was magnificent, and in batting he proved a hard nut to crack, his defence being admirable." Evans was noted as having "a beautiful delivery, quick rise from the pitch, and in the words of Lord Harris 'an accuracy worthy of Alfred Shaw'". However, when called up for the national team his accuracy deserted him, and he failed to make a serious impact.

After a career as a farmer, kangaroo shooter, and inspector of free selections, Evans died in Walgett, New South Wales, in 1921, aged 72. He was married twice, and had 16 children.
