= Charles Edwards (New Zealand cricketer) =

New Zealand cricketer

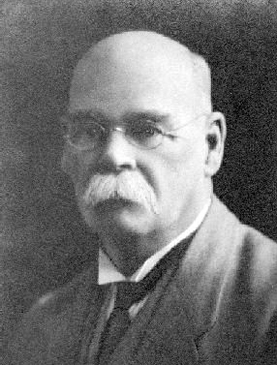

Personal information
- Full name: Charles Howard Edwards
- Born: 1856; Kew, Melbourne, Australia
- Died: 20 March 1924 (aged 67–68); Napier, New Zealand
- Bowling: Right-arm slow

Domestic team information
- Years: Team
- 1884-85 to 1887-88: Hawke's Bay

Career statistics
Competition	First-class
Matches	2
Runs scored	22
Batting average	11.00
100s/50s	0/0
Top score	22
Balls bowled	259
Wickets	9
Bowling average	11.33
5 wickets in innings	0
10 wickets in match	0
Best bowling	4/17
Catches/stumpings	3/0
- Source: Cricinfo, 21 June 2019

Charles Howard Edwards (1856 – 20 March 1924) was a New Zealand cricketer who played two matches of first-class cricket for Hawke's Bay in 1884 and 1888.

On his first-class debut in 1884–85 Edwards opened the bowling for Hawke's Bay and took 4 for 17 and 3 for 20 in Hawke's Bay's eight-wicket victory over Wellington. In a one-day match against the touring Australians in 1886–87 he took 6 for 39.

Edwards was appointed manager of the Napier Gas Company in 1886, and still held that position at the time of his sudden death in Napier in March 1924.
