= Andrew Grieve (cricketer) =

New Zealand cricketer

Personal information
- Full name: Andrew John Grieve
- Born: 24 October 1863; Dunedin, Otago, New Zealand
- Died: 12 December 1941 (aged 78); Dunedin, Otago, New Zealand

Domestic team information
- Years: Team
- 1884/85–1887/88: Otago
- Source: ESPNcricinfo, 13 May 2016

Andrew John Grieve (24 October 1863 – 12 December 1941) was a New Zealand cricketer. He played three first-class matches for Otago between the 1884–85 and 1887–88 seasons.

Grieve was born at Dunedin in 1863. He worked as a tinsmith.
