= Cumberland Basin =

Cumberland Basin could refer to:

- Cumberland Basin (Bristol), in Bristol, United Kingdom.
- Cumberland Basin (Canada), in Canada.
- Cumberland Basin (London), in London, United Kingdom.
- Cumberland Plain, also known as Cumberland Basin, in Sydney, Australia.
