= Dan Lynch (cricketer) =

New Zealand cricketer

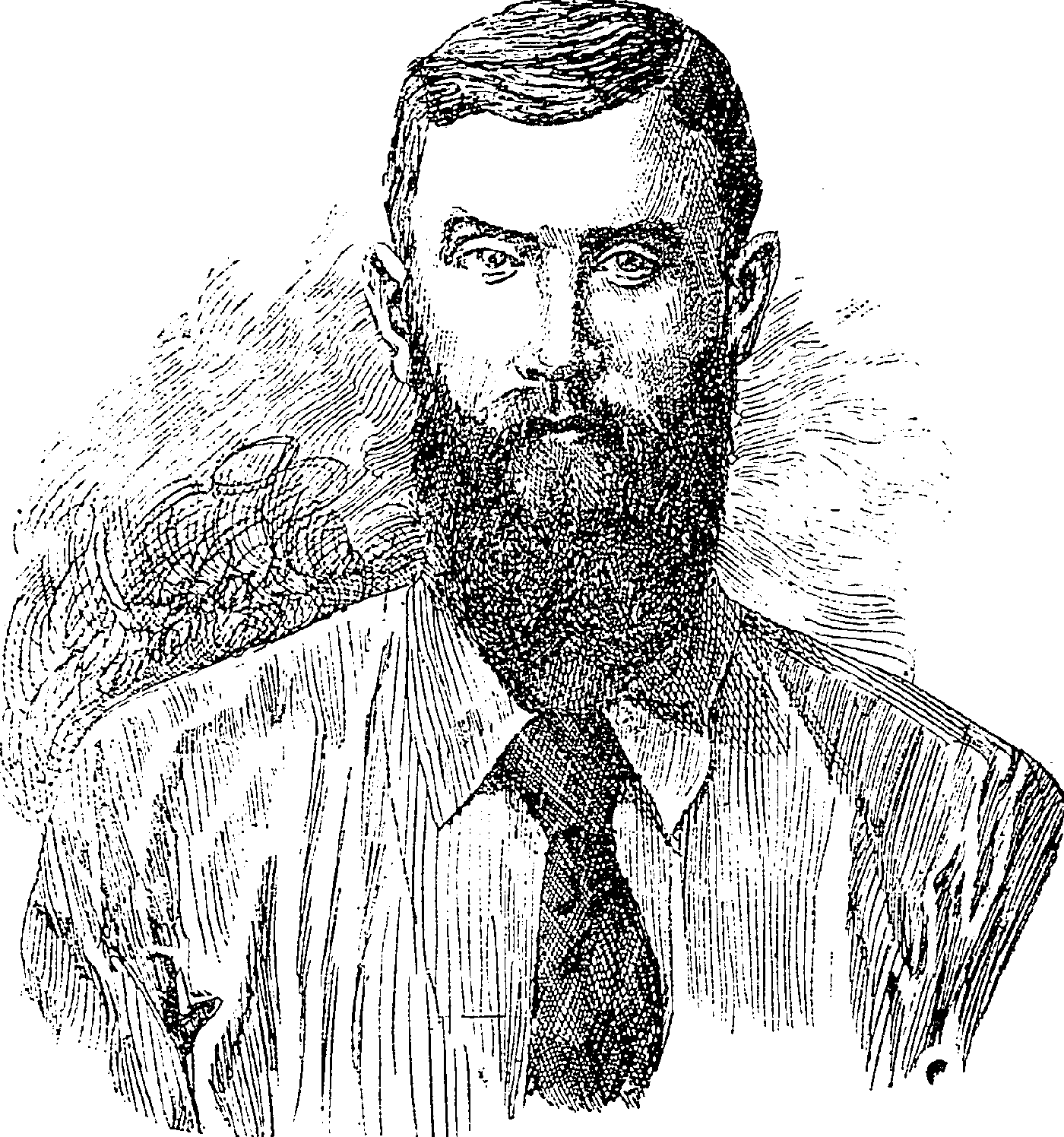
- Dan Lynch in 1894

Personal information
- Full name: Daniel Joseph Francis Lynch
- Born: 6 March 1854; Auckland, New Zealand
- Died: 3 December 1920 (aged 66); Auckland, New Zealand
- Relatives: Robert Lynch (brother)

Domestic team information
- Years: Team
- 1877/78–1889/90: Auckland

Career statistics
Competition	First-class
Matches	9
Runs scored	214
Batting average	14.26
100s/50s	0/1
Top score	81
Balls bowled	549
Wickets	15
Bowling average	14.00
5 wickets in innings	2
10 wickets in match	0
Best bowling	7/31
Catches/stumpings	9/–
- Source: Cricinfo, 7 April 2019

Daniel Joseph Francis Lynch (6 March 1854 – 3 December 1920) was a New Zealand cricketer. He played nine first-class matches for Auckland between 1877 and 1890.

Lynch's performances for Auckland against touring Australian teams were notable. When the Australians played an Auckland XXII in February 1878, Lynch opened the bowling and bowled through their innings, except for two overs, taking 5 for 67 in a total of 175. The Australians' most successful batsman on the tour, Charles Bannerman, rated Lynch as the most difficult bowler the Australians faced in New Zealand. Three years later, against the 1880-81 Australians, he took 7 for 46 in the second innings. Against the 1886-87 Australians he top-scored for the Auckland XXII with 46 in the first innings; no one else made more than 11 in either of Auckland's innings. Lynch's 46 was the highest score by any New Zealand batsman against the Australians on their first three tours of New Zealand.

On Lynch's first-class debut in December 1877 he took 7 for 31 and 2 for 58, but Auckland lost after Canterbury dismissed them for 13 in the second innings. In 1884-85 he took 6 for 17 when Auckland dismissed Otago for 35 and went on to win by five wickets. Later in his career he often played purely as a batsman, with a top score of 81, the highest score of the match, when Auckland beat Wellington by an innings and 101 runs in 1886–87.

Lynch died in Auckland's Mater Misericordiae Hospital on 3 December 1920, survived by his wife, Letty.
