= Glenbrook Creek =

Freshwater tributary, Australia

Coordinates: 33°46′52″S 150°38′28″E

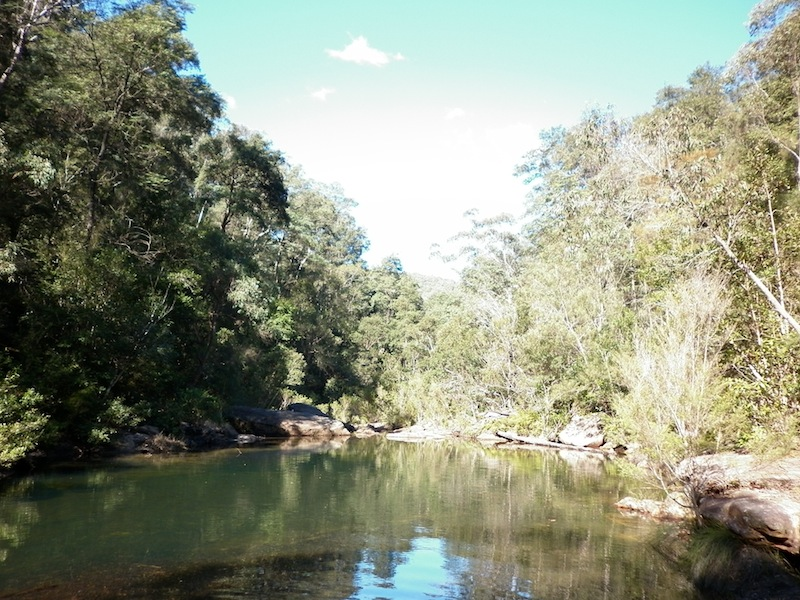
Glenbrook Creek

Glenbrook Creek is a freshwater tributary of the Nepean River. It is located within the Blue Mountains of New South Wales, Australia.

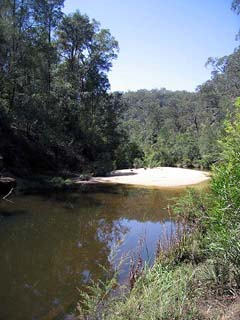
Sandbank on Glenbrook Creek

== Geography ==
The headwaters of Glenbrook Creek are approximately 5 km south-east of Linden, in the Blue Mountains National Park. The creek follows a mainly south-easterly course for its 17 km length. It starts at an altitude of 300m, and empties into the Nepean River at 30m, which is a descent of 270m. The lower reach of the creek passes through a valley known as "Glenbrook Gorge". It is the site of two swimming holes, Blue Pool and Jellybean Pool, and there are many bushwalking tracks along its banks.

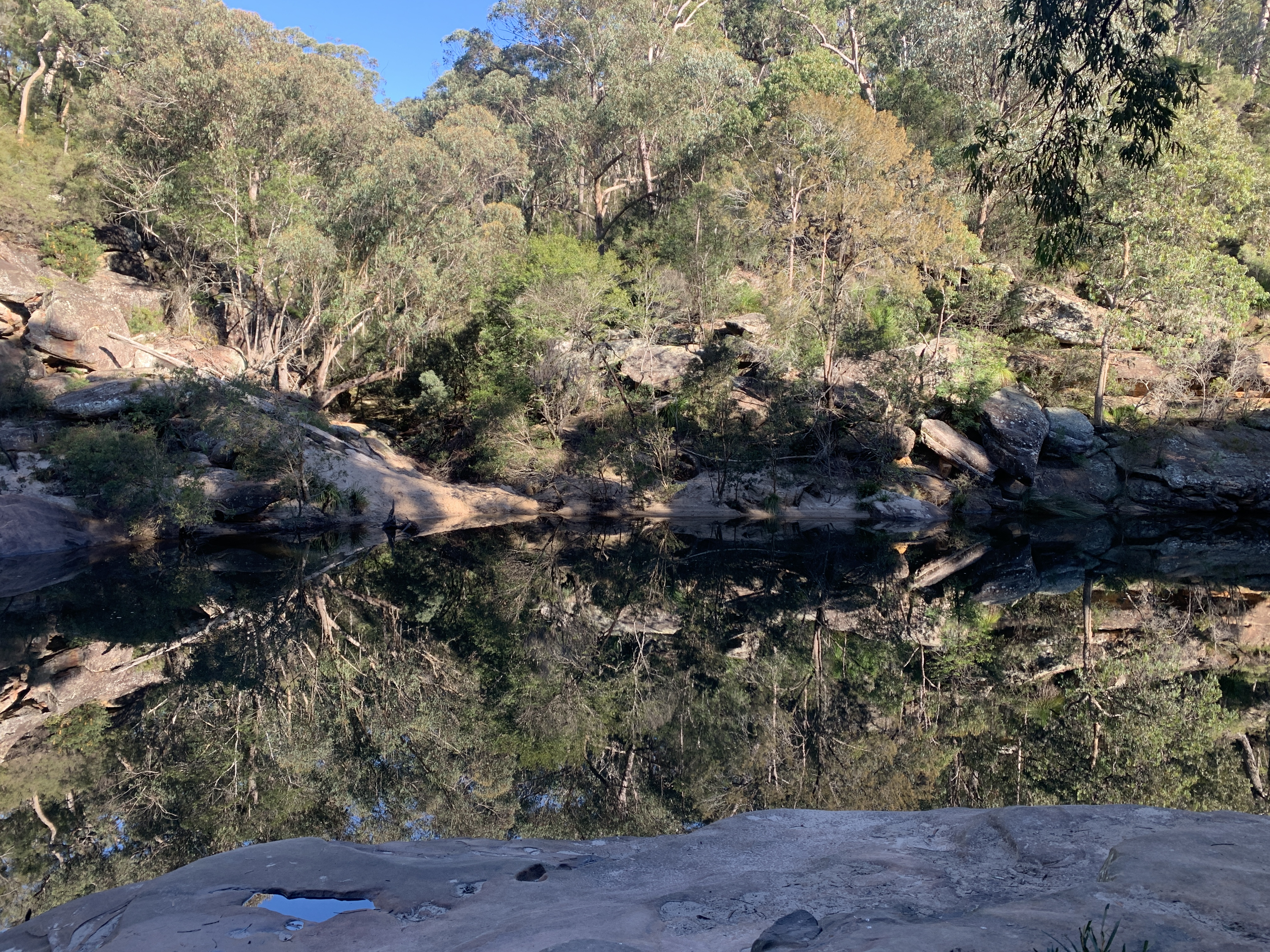
Jellybean Pool just downstream from Glenbrook Gorge

== History ==
Glenbrook Creek gave its name to Glenbrook Railway Station, which in turn gave its name to Glenbrook village, which the creek flows to the south of.
