= Nepean Creative and Performing Arts High School =

Location
- 115–119 Great Western Highway, Emu Plains, New South Wales; Australia; 33°44′54″S 150°40′09″E

Information
- Former name: Nepean High School
- Type: Government-funded co-educational comprehensive and specialist secondary day school
- Motto: Aspire the Heights
- Established: 1963
- School district: Metropolitan North: Penrith
- Educational authority: New South Wales Department of Education
- Specialist: Performing arts
- Years: 7–12
- Enrolment: c. 896
- Campus size: 12 hectares (30 acres)
- Campus type: Suburban
- Website: nepean-h.schools.nsw.gov.au

The Nepean Creative and Performing Arts High School (formerly Nepean High School) is a government-funded co-educational comprehensive and specialist secondary day school with speciality in performing arts, located in Emu Plains, a suburb in western Sydney, New South Wales, Australia. The school is located adjacent to the Emu Plains railway station.

== Overview ==
Nepean Creative and Performing Arts High School was founded in 1963 as Nepean High School and became a creative and performing arts school in 2011, and provides an education for students from Year 7 to Year 12. The school is open to many including local students, auditioned students and students in the special education program. In 2010, the number of students attending the school was above 500. Since the CAPA program was started that number has risen to over 1,000. The school's motto is "Aspire the Heights". The school has been involved in School Spectacular, including at least one student being a featured artist.

=== Animal cruelty attacks ===
In 2009, the school was the target of several attacks on its agricultural areas; a goat, several chickens and other animals were killed and/or mutilated. The perpetrators were not identified; however, sympathy was shown from all across the region and a walk-a-thon helped raise funds to replace the animals and improve security.

== Notable alumni ==
- Karyn Paluzzano – former politician

== See also ==
- List of government schools in New South Wales
- List of selective high schools in New South Wales
- List of creative and performing arts high schools in New South Wales
