= Lapstone railway station =

Railway station in New South Wales, Australia

Lapstone
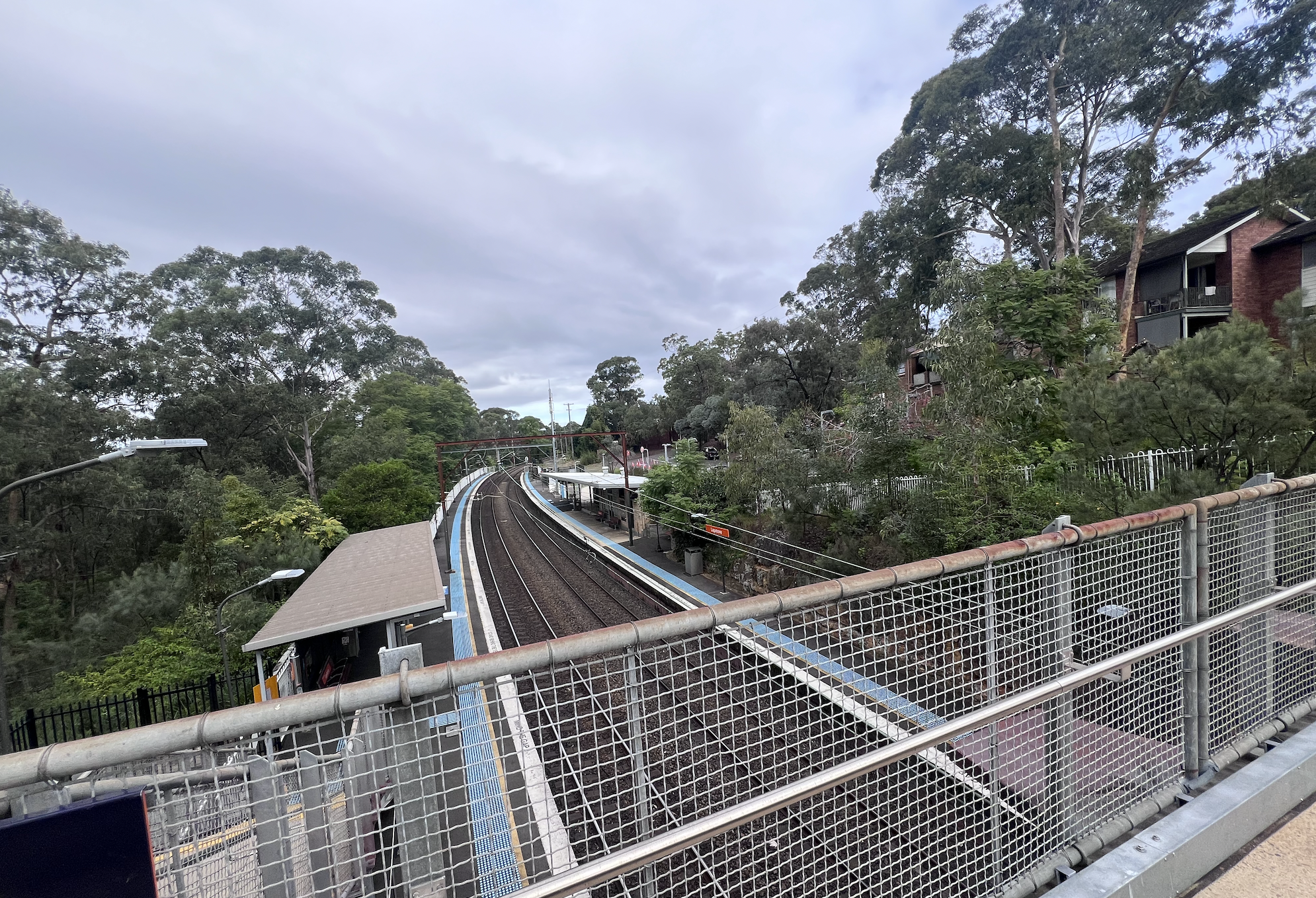
- Westbound view of platforms and station buildings, May 2025

General information
- Location: Explorers Road, Lapstone; Australia
- Coordinates: 33°46′25″S 150°38′34″E
- Elevation: 115 metres (377 ft)
- Owner: Transport Asset Manager of New South Wales
- Operator: Sydney Trains
- Line: Main Western
- Distance: 63.62 kilometres (39.53 mi) from Central
- Platforms: 2 side
- Tracks: 2

Construction
- Structure type: Ground
- Parking: 39 spaces
- Accessible: yes

Other information
- Status: Weekdays: Staffed: 6am to 10am: Weekends and public holidays: Unstaffed
- Station code: LAP
- Website: Transport for NSW

History
- Opened: 24 February 1964

Passengers
- 2025: 37,012 (year); 101 (daily) (Sydney Trains)

Services
Preceding station	Intercity Trains	Following station
Glenbrook towards Lithgow	Blue Mountains Line	Emu Plains towards Central
Location

Lapstone railway station is located on the Main Western line in New South Wales, Australia. It serves the Blue Mountains village of Lapstone opening on 24 February 1964.

== History ==
The station was created in 1964 after being funded by Alderman Arthur Hand, who founded the town of Lapstone. In April 2021, the station was upgraded and received a new lift and platform tactiles.

== Platforms and services ==
Lapstone has two side platforms. It is serviced by Sydney Trains Blue Mountains Line services travelling from Sydney Central to Lithgow.

Platform	Line	Stopping pattern	Notes
1	Blue Mountains Line	services to Sydney Central	
2	Blue Mountains Line	services to Springwood, Katoomba, Mount Victoria & Lithgow	

== Transport links ==
Blue Mountains Transit operates one bus route via Lapstone station, under contract to Transport for NSW:

- 691: Penrith station to Mount Riverview

== Gallery ==
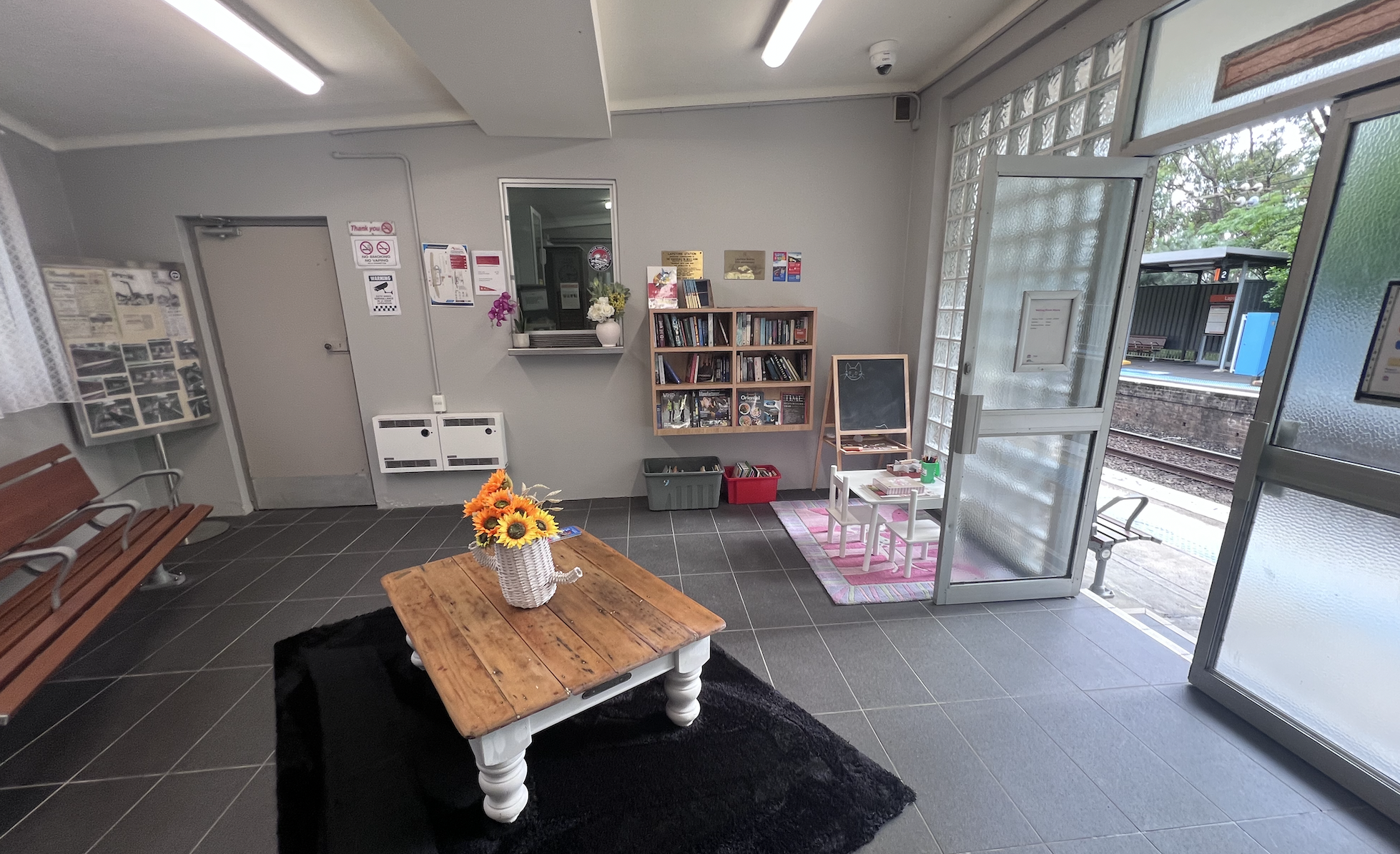
The waiting room in Lapstone Station

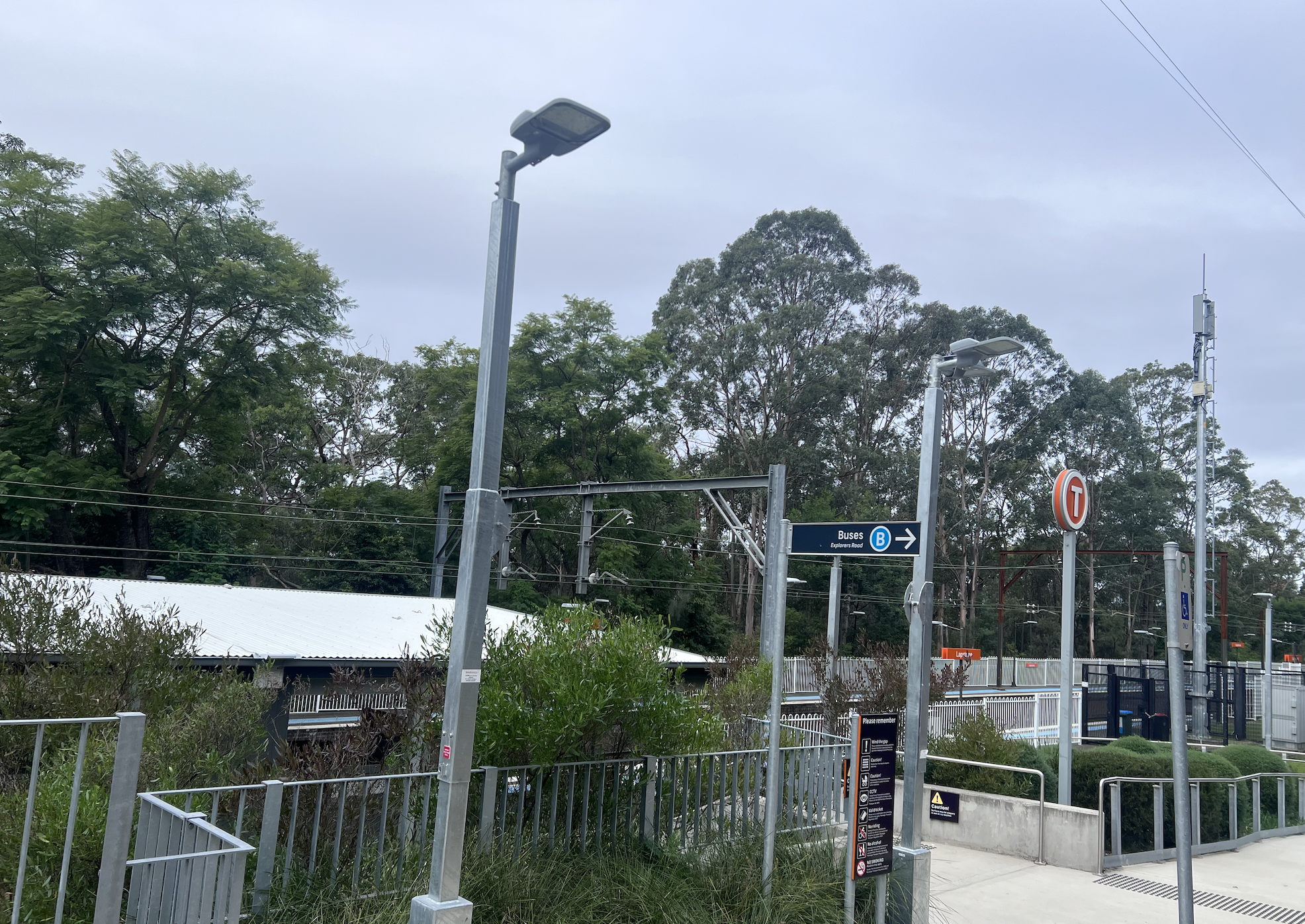
The entrance of Lapstone Railway station
