= Gorell =

Gorell may refer to:

- Chris Gorell Barnes, English digital entrepreneur and marine conservationist, executive producer of the documentary The End of the Line
- Frank Gorell (1927–1994), American politician, 47th Lieutenant Governor of Tennessee from 1967 to 1971
- Jeff Gorell (born 1970), currently Deputy Mayor of the City of Los Angeles for Homeland Security and Public Safety
- Arthur John Robin Gorell Milner (1934–2010), British computer scientist and a Turing Award winner

Barons:

- Baron Gorell, of Brampton in the County of Derby, is a title in the Peerage of the United Kingdom
- Gorell Barnes, 1st Baron Gorell PC (1848–1913), British lawyer and judge
- Henry Barnes, 2nd Baron Gorell DSO (1882–1917), British Army officer
- Ronald Barnes, 3rd Baron Gorell CBE MC (1884–1963), British peer, Liberal politician, poet, author and newspaper editor
- Timothy Barnes, 4th Baron Gorell (1927–2007), British businessman
- John Barnes, 5th Baron Gorell (born 1959), British Chartered Surveyor

== See also ==
- Goriella
- Gorrell
- Gouryella
- Gowrelli
