= Bill Liardet =

British Army officer

Major-General Bill Liardet CB CBE DSO DL
- Born: Henry Maughan Liardet; 27 October 1906; Birkenhead, Cheshire, England
- Died: 8 February 1996 (aged 89); Arundel, West Sussex, England
- Relatives: Sir Claude Liardet (father)
- Military career
- Allegiance: United Kingdom
- Branch: British Army
- Service years: 1924–1964
- Rank: Major-General
- Nickname: "Bill"
- Service number: 31303
- Units: Royal Artillery; Royal Tank Regiment
- Commands: 23rd Armoured Brigade (1953–1954); 8th Royal Tank Regiment (1949–1950); 25th Armoured Engineer Brigade Royal Engineers (1945); 1st Armoured Replacement Group (1944); 6th Royal Tank Regiment (1942–1944)
- Conflicts: Second World War; Palestine Emergency
- Awards: Companion of the Order of the Bath; Commander of the Order of the British Empire; Distinguished Service Order; Mentioned in Despatches (2)

Major-General Henry Maughan "Bill" Liardet CB CBE DSO DL (27 October 1906 – 8 February 1996) was a senior British Army officer.

== Military career ==
The son of a British Army officer, Major-General Claude Liardet, "Bill" Liardet was born in Birkenhead, England on 27 October 1906. Like his father, Liardet was initially educated at Bedford School, Liardet was commissioned into the Royal Artillery, Royal Tank Corps in 1927, serving in India and Egypt between 1927 and 1938. In 1939, the year the Second World War began, Liardet was in England attending the Staff College, Camberley, which graduated early due to the war's beginning in September.

During the war he served at the War Office between 1939 and 1941 and commanded the 6th Royal Tank Regiment from 1942 until 1944. In 1945 he was appointed commander of the 25th Armoured Engineer Brigade Royal Engineers. Between 1949 and 1950 he served as commander of the 8th Royal Tank Regiment and, between 1953 and 1956, as commander of the 23rd Armoured Brigade, during which he attended the Imperial Defence College in 1955. From 1956 until 1958 he served as chief of staff to the British Joint Services Mission in Washington, D.C.

== Later years and death ==
Liardet retired from the army in 1964. He died in 1996 at the age of 89.
