= Gorrell =

Gorrell is a surname. Notable people with the surname include:

- Aaron Gorrell (born 1981), American rugby league footballer
- Ashley Gorrell, American actress
- Charles Gorrell (1871–1917), officer in the Canadian Army Medical Corps, committed suicide while mentally disturbed
- Edgar S. Gorrell (1891—1945), American military officer and businessman
- Faith Lanman Gorrell (1881–1966), American home economist and educator
- Frank Gorrell (1927-1994), American politician
- Henry Tilton Gorrell (1911–1958), American war correspondent
- Miles Gorrell (born 1955), Canadian football league player
- Stuart Gorrell (1901–1963), American singer-songwriter

== See also ==
- Gorell, a surname
- Gorrell Run, a stream in West Virginia, United States
