= Baron Gorell =

Barony in the Peerage of the United Kingdom

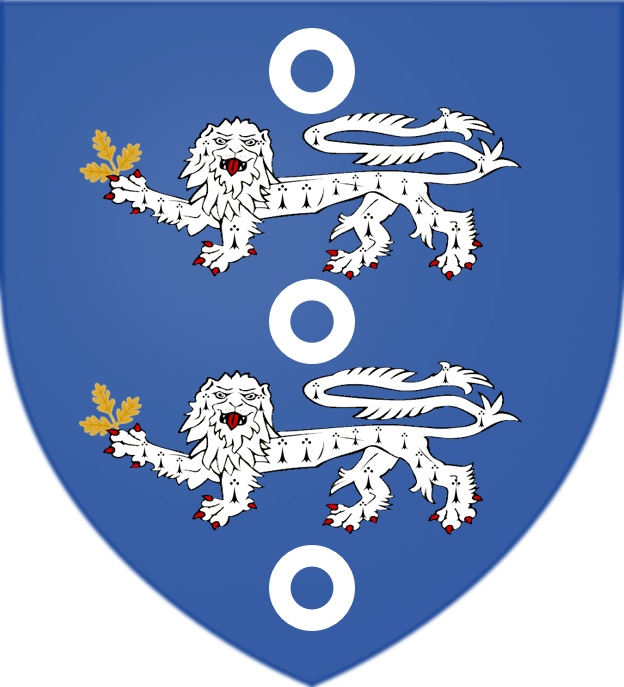
- Blazon Arms: Azure two lions passant guardant Ermine each holding in the dexter paw a sprig of oak slipped Or between three annulets in pale Argent. Crest: In front of a cubit arm in armour, the hand grasping a broken sword all Proper the wrist encircled by a wreath of oak Or, five annulets interlaced and fessways Argent. Supporters: On either side a ram Proper charged on the shoulder with two annulets interlaced Azure.
- Creation date: 16 February 1909
- Created by: Edward VII
- Peerage: United Kingdom
- First holder: Gorell Barnes
- Present holder: John Barnes
- Heir apparent: Oliver Barnes
- Remainder to: the 1st Baron's heirs male lawfully begotten
- Status: Extant
- Motto: Frangas Non Flectes (You May Break, You Shall Not Bend Me)

Baron Gorell, of Brampton in the County of Derby, is a title in the Peerage of the United Kingdom. It was created on 16 February 1909 for Sir Gorell Barnes, President of the Probate, Divorce and Admiralty Division of the High Court of Justice from 1905 to 1909. His eldest son, the second Baron, was killed in the First World War and was succeeded by his younger brother, the third Baron. He notably served as Under-Secretary of State for Air between 1921 and 1922 in the coalition government of David Lloyd George. He was succeeded by his son, the fourth Baron. He was a Senior Executive of the Royal Dutch/Shell Group from 1959 to 1984. As of 2017 the title is held by his nephew, the fifth Baron, who succeeded in 2007. He is the son of the Hon. Ronald Alexander Henry Barnes.

== Baron Gorell (1909) ==
- (John) Gorell Barnes, 1st Baron Gorell (1848–1913)
- Henry Gorell Barnes, 2nd Baron Gorell (1882–1917)
- Ronald Gorell Barnes, 3rd Baron Gorell (1884–1963)
- Timothy John Radcliffe Barnes, 4th Baron Gorell (1927–2007)
- John Picton Gorell Barnes, 5th Baron Gorell (born 1959)

The heir apparent is the present holder's son, the Hon. Oliver Gorell Barnes (born 1993).

=== Title succession chart ===
Title succession chart, Barons Gorell

Gorell Barnes; 1st Baron Gorell; 1848–1913
Henry Barnes; 2nd Baron Gorell; 1882–1917	Ronald Barnes; 3rd Baron Gorell; 1884–1963
Timothy Barnes; 4th Baron Gorell; 1927–2007	Hon. Ronald Barnes; 1931–2003
John Barnes; 5th Baron Gorell born 1959
Hon. Oliver Barnes born 1993

== External sources ==
- Hesilrige, Arthur G. M. (1921). Debrett's Peerage and Titles of courtesy. London: Dean & Son. p. 408.
- Kidd, Charles, Williamson, David (editors). Debrett's Peerage and Baronetage (1990 edition). New York: St Martin's Press, 1990.
- Leigh Rayment's Peerage Pages
