= 7th County of London Brigade, Royal Field Artillery =

7th County of London Brigade, RFA 64th (7th London) Field Regiment, RA 264 (7th London) Field Regiment, RA
- Royal Artillery cap badge (pre-1953)
- Active: 1 May 1908 – 1 May 1961
- Country: United Kingdom
- Branch: Territorial Force
- Type: Artillery Brigade/Regiment
- Role: Field artillery
- Part of: 47th (1/2nd London) Division; 60th (2/2nd London) Division; 56th (London) Division
- Garrison/HQ: Shepherd's Bush; Fulham
- Engagements: First World War: Battle of Aubers Ridge; Battle of Festubert; Battle of Loos; Battle of the Somme; Salonika; Palestine; Second World War: North Africa; Operation Avalanche; Crossing of the Garigliano; Battle of Anzio; Operation Olive; Operation Grapeshot; Liberation of the Netherlands

Commanders
- Notable commanders: Maj-Gen Claude Liardet

The 7th London Brigade, Royal Field Artillery was a new unit formed when Britain's Territorial Force was created in 1908. Its origin lay in Artillery Volunteer Corps formed in West London in the 1860s, which had later been incorporated into a larger London unit. Together with its wartime duplicate it served on the Western Front, at Salonika and in Palestine during the First World War. It formed several units for service in the Second World War, when they were in action in North Africa, Italy and North West Europe. The unit continued in the postwar Territorial Army until 1961.

== Origin ==
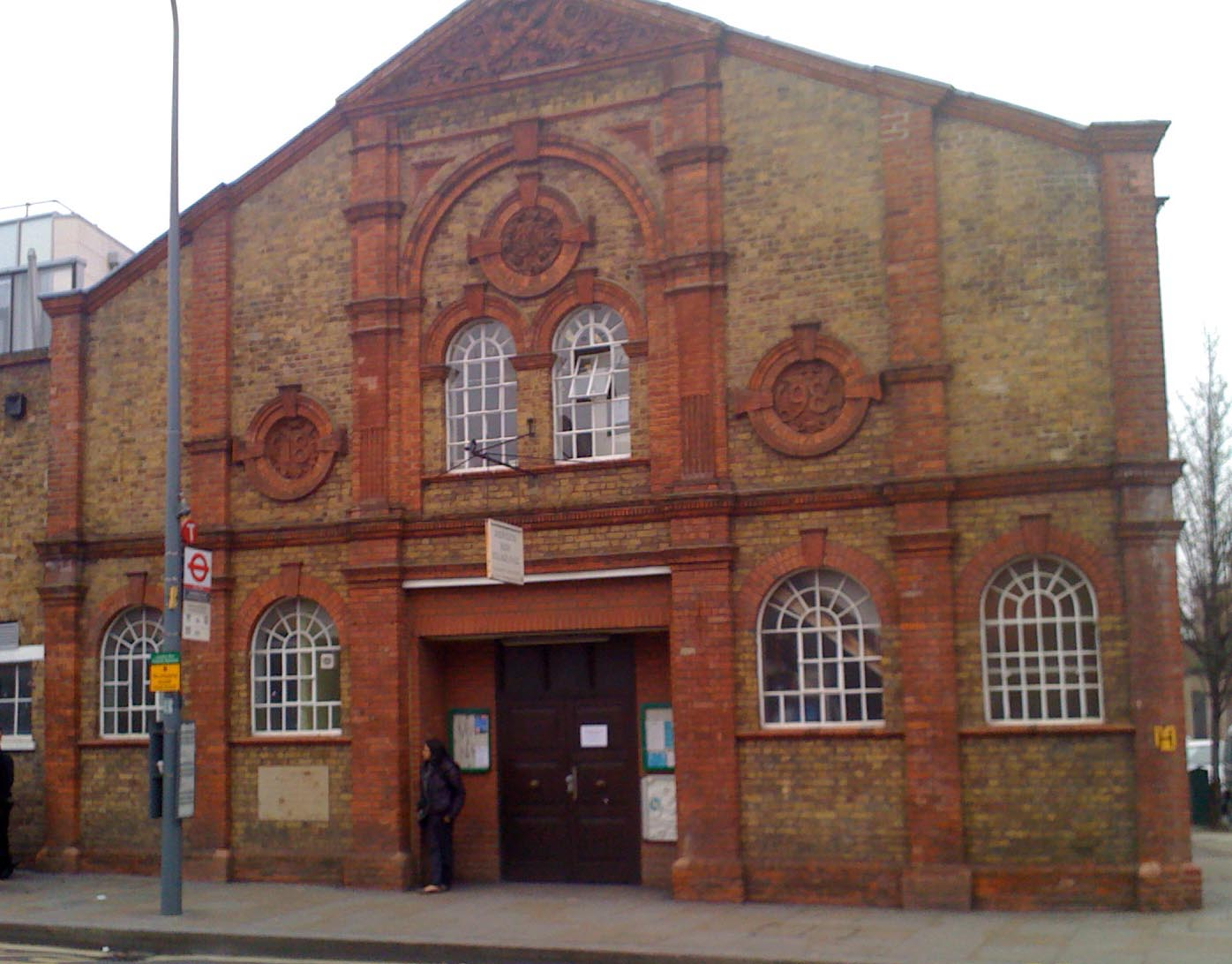
Drill Hall built at Wood Lane, Shepherd's Bush, in 1898 for some of the batteries of the 1st City London Artillery, later used by the 7th London Brigade

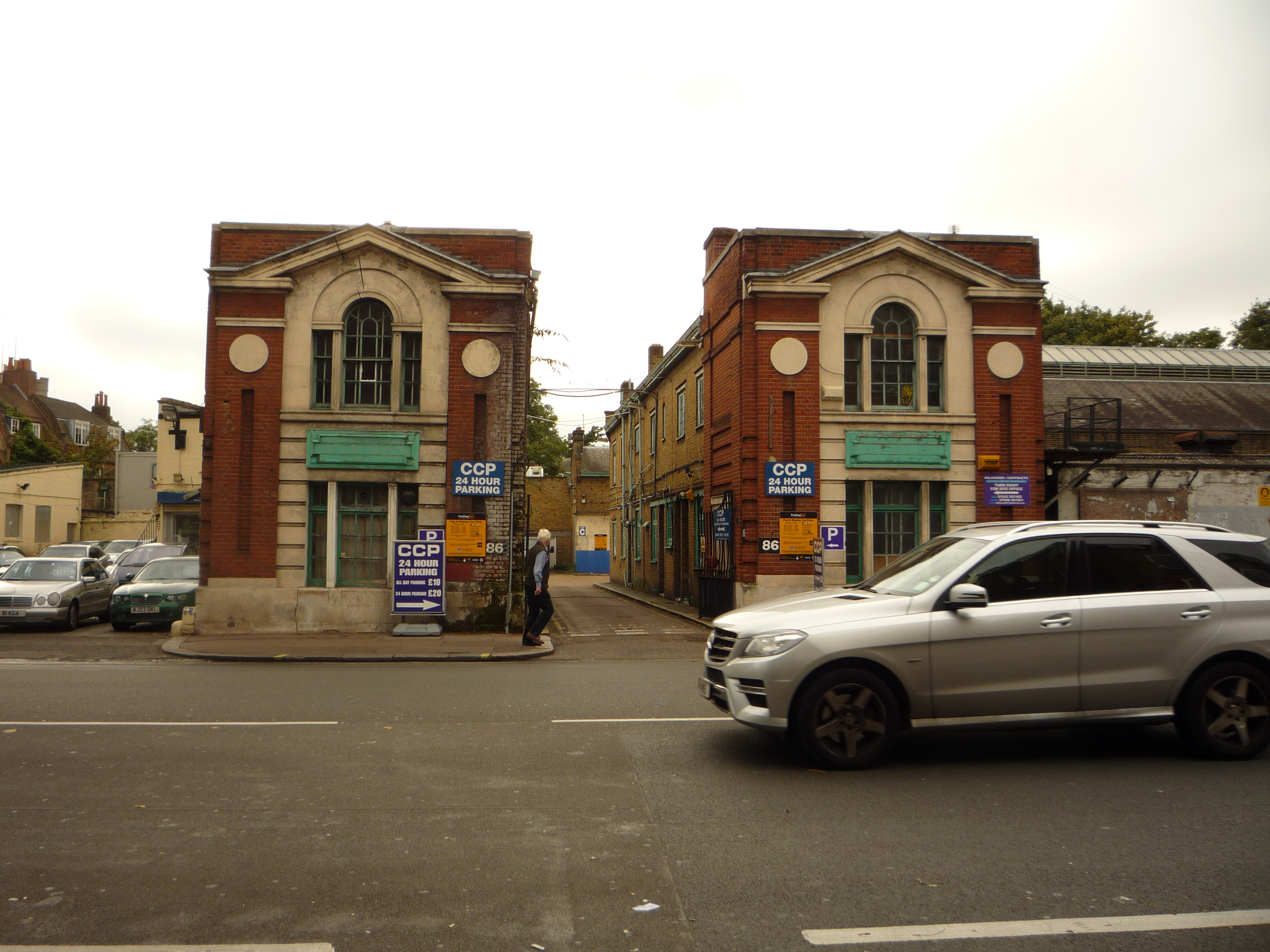
Entrance to the former drill hall of the 7th County of London Brigade, Royal Field Artillery, 86 Fulham Road, in 2012 (now demolished)

When the Volunteers were subsumed into the new Territorial Force (TF) on 1 May 1908 under the Haldane Reforms, the 1st City of London Artillery split to form three brigades in the Royal Field Artillery: I City of London Brigade in the City of London, VI County of London Brigade at Brixton in South London, and VII County of London Brigade at Wood Lane, Shepherd's Bush, in West London. The VII (or 7th) London Brigade was formed on 1 May 1908 from Nos 8–10 Companies of the 1st City Artillery, descended from part of the 1st Surrey Artillery Volunteers, which had been absorbed by the City of London Artillery in 1883. The commanding officer (CO) was Lieutenant-Colonel Charles Chambers, VD, who had previously commanded the 1st City Artillery.

The new unit had the following organisation:

- 18th County of London Battery
- 19th County of London Battery
- 20th County of London Battery
- 7th London Ammunition Column

Before 1914 the brigade (except 19th Bty) moved from Shepherd's Bush to 86 Fulham High Street. (Note: Not the better-known drill hall at Fulham House, but a building with drill yard and gun shed on Fulham Road, now demolished.) The brigade was assigned to 2nd London Division of the TF. The three batteries were each equipped with four 15-pounder guns.

== First World War ==
=== Mobilisation and organisation ===
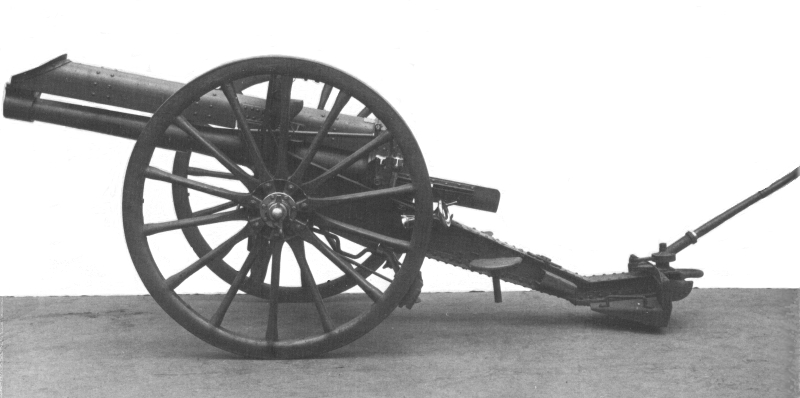
BLC 15-pounder gun issued to TF field brigades

When war broke out in August 1914, VII London Bde had only just arrived at Perham Down on Salisbury Plain for its annual training camp, and it was immediately recalled to London to mobilise under the command of Brevet Colonel Chambers. After completing their mobilisation the 2nd London Division's artillery brigades moved to the country round Hemel Hempstead, Berkhamsted and Kings Langley in Hertfordshire to begin war training.

On the outbreak of war, TF units were invited to volunteer for Overseas Service. On 15 August 1914, the War Office issued instructions to separate those men who had signed up for Home Service only, and form these into reserve units. On 31 August, the formation of a reserve or 2nd Line unit was authorised for each 1st Line unit where 60 per cent or more of the men had volunteered for Overseas Service. The titles of these 2nd Line units would be the same as the original, but distinguished by a '2/' prefix. In this way duplicate batteries, brigades and divisions were created, mirroring those TF formations being sent overseas. Eventually these too were prepared for overseas service and 3rd Line reserve units were formed to produce reinforcement drafts to the others. The duplicate 2/VII London Brigade was formed in September 1914.

=== 1/VII London Brigade ===
At the end of October 1914 the 2nd London Division was chosen to reinforce the British Expeditionary Force (BEF) fighting on the Western Front and training was stepped up, despite bad weather and equipment shortages. Brigade and divisional training began in February 1915 and it received its orders for the move to France on 2 March. By 22 March all the batteries had reached the divisional concentration area around Béthune.

==== Aubers Ridge ====
While the division's infantry were introduced to trench routine by being attached in groups to the 1st and 2nd Divisions holding the line, the TF field batteries with their obsolescent 15-pounders were interspersed with those of the two Regular divisions equipped with modern 18-pounder guns. However, ammunition was very scarce, and the guns were restricted to three rounds per gun per day during April. Ammunition was being saved up for the Battle of Aubers Ridge on 9 May, when the 15-pounders of 1/VII London Bde joined with the guns of 1st and 2nd Divisions and the Royal Horse Artillery (RHA) to cut the barbed wire for the assault by 1st Division. The bombardment began at 05.00 with Shrapnel shell, then at 05.30 the guns switched to High Explosive (HE) shell to join the howitzers already firing at the German breastworks. At 05.40 the guns lifted to targets 600 yards (550 m) further back and the infantry moved to the attack. The attackers ran into devastating machine gun fire (there was no artillery barrage to suppress the defenders) and they found that the wire was inadequately cut and the breastworks barely touched. The inexperienced artillery had failed in all its tasks. A renewed bombardment was ordered from 06.15 to 07.00, but the artillery's forward observation officers (FOOs) were unable to locate the hidden German machine gun positions, which required a direct hit from an HE shell to be put out of action. The second attack failed as badly as the first, as did two others launched during the afternoon, and the survivors were pinned down in No man's land until nightfall, despite a further bombardment being laid on to allow them to withdraw.

==== Festubert ====
Although 2nd London Division suffered few casualties at Aubers Ridge, its gunners had learned a sobering lesson about the impossibility of suppressing strong defences with inadequate guns and shells. On 11 May the division was redesignated 47th (1/2nd London) Division, and on the night of 14/15 May it took its place in the line for the Battle of Festubert. The guns were already in place, with 47th Divisional Artillery operating under the control of 7th Division. Despite the continuing shortage of ammunition, the plan this time was for a long methodical bombardment. On 13 and 14 May the field guns carried out three two-hour deliberate bombardments each day, attacking the wire with slow observed fire or keeping the enemy communication trenches under fire. At night they carried out intermittent bombardments of the communication trenches and defences, to stop supplies being brought up and to prevent repairs being carried out. The guns fired about 100 rounds per day. During 15 May feint bombardments mimicking the moment of assault were carried out, but the actual attack was made after dark with some success. The fighting went on for several days, and 47th (2nd L) Division made its own first attack on the night of 25 May. The leading brigade captured the German front and support trenches, but was then pinned down by accurate German artillery fire and could advance no further. This effectively ended the battle. The heavy rate of fire during the battle was too much for the old 15-pdrs: by 26 May, 11 out of 36 guns in the division were out of action.

==== Loos ====
In June 47th (2nd L) Division took over trenches in front of Loos-en-Gohelle from the French. In August the divisional artillery was rested for the first time since March, and the brigade began training on the 18-pounder for when these became available. The Loos sector had been selected for the next major British attack (the Battle of Loos), to which part of 47th (2nd L) Division would provide the southern 'hinge'. 1/VII London Bde with its obsolescent guns was not assigned a major role in the complex artillery plan, and it remained in reserve behind the attack of 140th (4th London) Brigade except for two batteries; of these a section of 1/19th Bty was attached to 15th (Scottish) Divisional Artillery. Supported by poison gas clouds, the attacking portion of 47th (2nd L) Division made good progress towards its limited objective, and 15th (S) Division had almost broken through, though it had failed to take Hill 70. However, events had not played out so well further north at the Hohenzollern Redoubt, and the battle raged on after 47th (2nd L) Division had been relieved between 28 September and 1 October.

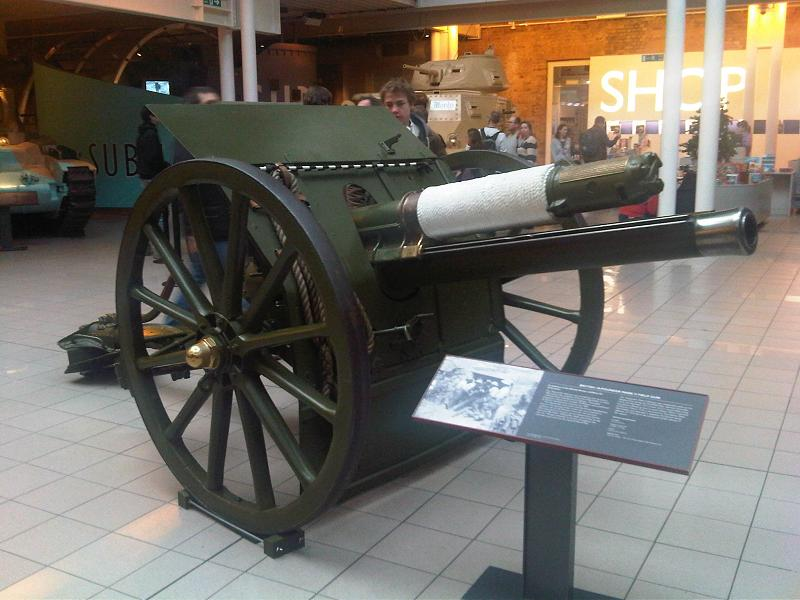
18-pounder preserved at the Imperial War Museum

On 13 October 47th (2nd L) Division was in support for the final attack on the Hohenzollern Redoubt, and was practising on dummy trenches for a follow-up attack on Hulluch next day, but the results at the Hohenzollern were so disappointing that the operation was cancelled. The division took over the line and the artillery was in constant action over the following weeks. On 6 November 1915 the batteries of 1/VII London Bde were re-equipped with modern 18-pounders, for which they had been training since August; ammunition supply also improved. Colonel Chambers was succeeded as CO by Lt-Col W.E. Peal, DSO, promoted from command of 20th Bty during November.

The division returned to the Loos sector in January 1916, with most of the artillery round Grenay, with Observation Posts (OPs) in the cottages of Maroc. The guns carried out a great deal of counter-battery (CB) work against battery positions in and around Lens. However, there was now a policy of pushing a few guns close up behind the infantry's trenches, and a gun of 1/19th Bty was brought into action from the mine pit (fosse) at Calonne, no more than 300 yards (270 m) from the front line, from where it could shoot laterally at the railway triangle east of Loos. 'Although searched for by every type of missile, including trench-mortar bombs, the gun remained in action for several weeks, until the battery left the neighbourhood'.

==== Spring 1916 ====
On 24 April 1/VII London Bde was joined by an additional 4-gun battery, manned by half of 93rd Bty RFA, a Regular battery that had come to France from India with the 3rd (Lahore) Division and stayed with the BEF when the division went to Mesopotamia. This became R/VII Bty, but only stayed a short time: on 17 May 1916 1/VII London Bde was renumbered CCXXXVII Bde (237 Bde) and the batteries were designated A, B and C; R Bty transferred to CCXXXVIII (formerly VIII London Bde). At the same time the brigade ammunition columns (BACs) were abolished and incorporated into the divisional ammunition column (DAC).

In the spring of 1916, 47th (2nd L) Division took over the lines facing Vimy Ridge. Active mine warfare was being conducted by both sides underground. In May the Germans secretly assembled 80 batteries in the sector and on 21 May carried out a heavy bombardment in the morning; the bombardment resumed at 15.00 and an assault was launched at 15.45, while the guns lifted onto the British guns and fired a Box barrage into Zouave Valley to seal the attacked sector off from support. 47th Divisional Artillery reported 150 heavy shells an hour landing on its poorly-covered battery positions and guns being put out of action, while its own guns tried to respond to SOS calls from the infantry under attack, though most communications were cut by the box barrage. During the night the gun pits were shelled with gas, but on 22 May the artillery duel began to swing towards the British, with fresh batteries brought in, despite their shortage of ammunition. A system of 'one round strikes' was introduced: whenever a German battery was identified every gun in range fired one round at it, which effectively suppressed them. British counter-attacks were attempted, but when the fighting died down the Germans had succeeded in capturing the British front line. Throughout their stay in the Vimy sector the batteries suffered heavily from German CB fire.

==== Somme ====
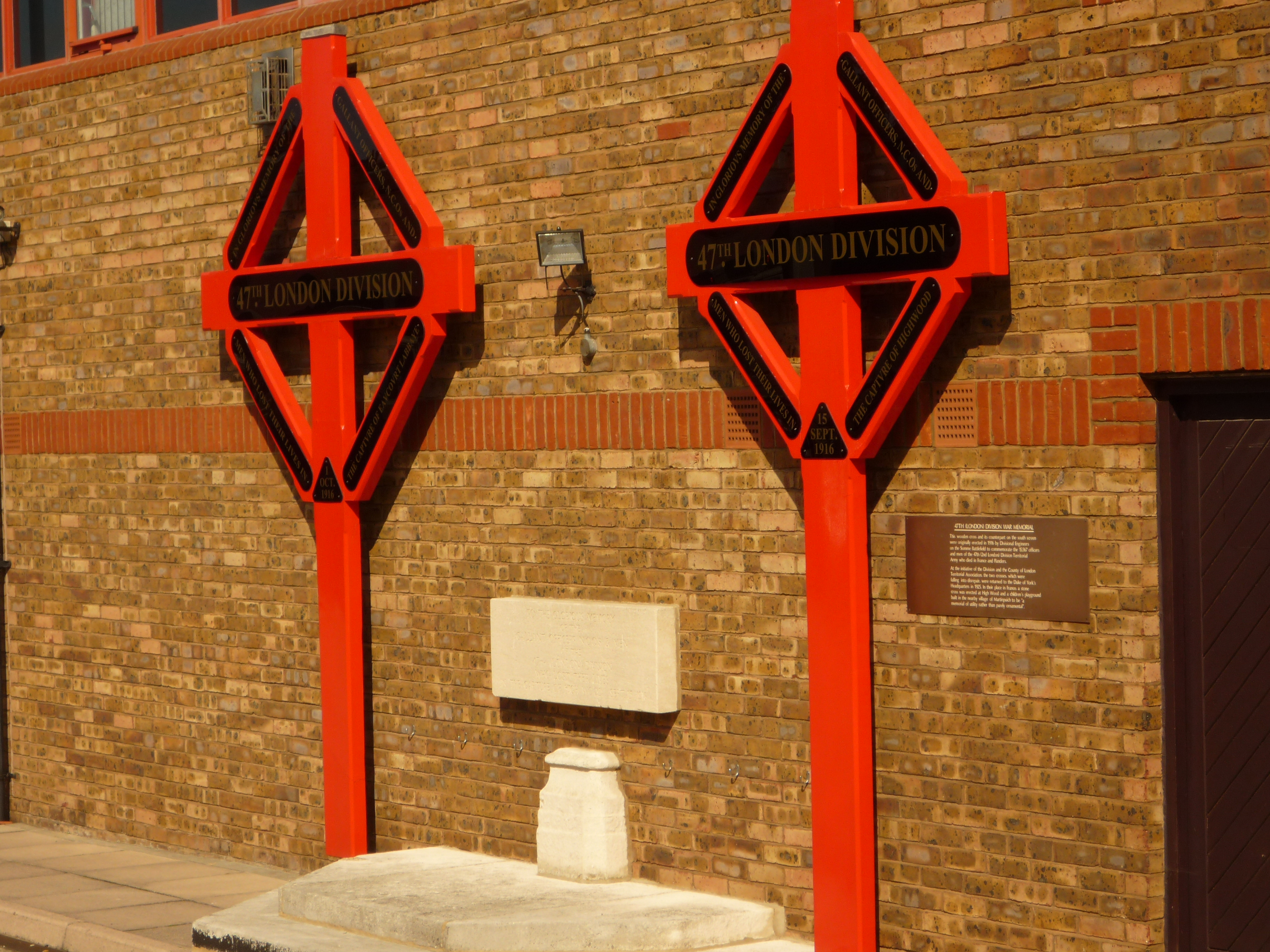
The two wooden memorial crosses originally erected at High Wood and Eaucourt l'Abbaye by 47th (2nd London) Division in 1916, now at Connaught House in Camberwell

On 1 August 1916 47th (2nd L) Division began to move south to join in the Somme Offensive. While the infantry underwent training with the newly-introduced tanks, the divisional artillery went into the line on 14 August in support of 15th (Scottish) Division. The batteries were positioned in Bottom Wood and near Mametz Wood, and became familiar with the ground over which 47th (2nd L) Division was later to attack, while supporting 15th (S) Division's gradual encroachment on Martinpuich. Casualties among FOOs and signallers was heavy in this kind of fighting. Between 9 and 11 September 47th (2nd L) Division took over the front in the High Wood sector, and on 15 September the Battle of Flers-Courcelette was launched, with tank support for the first time. The barrage fired by the divisional artillery left lanes through which the tanks could advance. However, the tanks proved useless in the tangled tree stumps of High Wood, and the artillery could not bombard the German front line because No man's land was so narrow. Casualties among the attacking infantry were extremely heavy, but they succeeded in capturing High Wood and the gun batteries began to move up in support, crossing deeply-cratered ground. The first to arrive was 1/19th Bty under its commander, Maj Lord Gorell, who brought it up into the shell-hole area immediately behind High Wood. He then made a reconnaissance of the whole divisional front with Maj E.H.Marshall of 1/18th Bty. Lord Gorell was awarded a Distinguished Service Order (DSO) for this work. Casualties among the exposed guns and gunners took their toll, but a German counter-attack was broken up by gunfire. Next day the division fought to consolidate its positions round the captured 'Cough Drop' strongpoint. When the infantry were relieved on 19 September the artillery remained in the line under 1st Division.

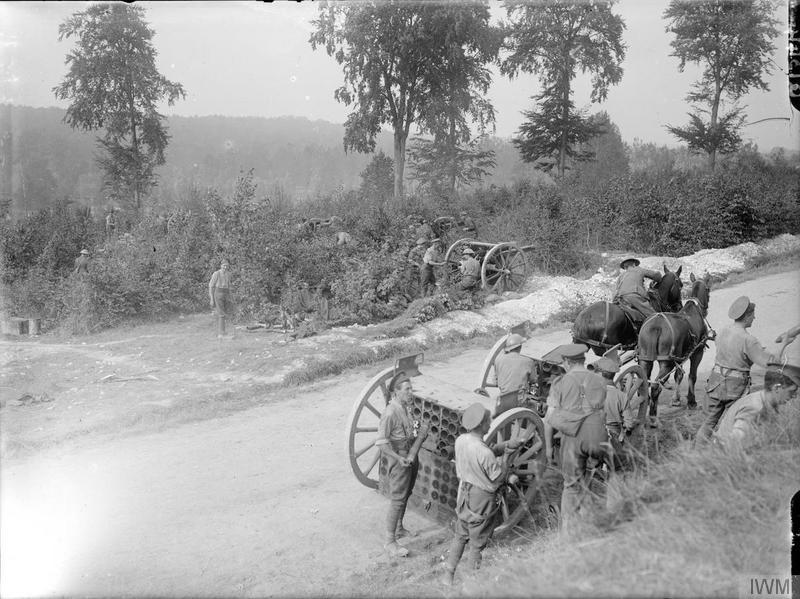
Bringing up ammunition for an 18-pounder battery during the Battle of the Somme

47th (2nd L) Division came back into the line to relieve 1st Division on 28/29 September, and began attacking Eaucourt L'Abbaye as part of the Battle of the Transloy Ridges, finally securing the ruins on 3 October. This allowed the batteries to cross the High Wood Ridge into a small valley where they remained for the rest of the Somme fighting, helping to cover the unsuccessful attacks by 47th (2nd L) Division and later 9th (Scottish) Division against the Butte de Warlencourt through October. By now the gun lines were crowded together in deep mud, guns sank up to their axles, and getting ammunition through was extremely difficult. The artillery was finally relieved on 14 October and followed the rest of the division to the Ypres Salient.

A further reorganisation of field artillery in the BEF was carried out in November 1916. To increase the batteries of other brigades of the division to six guns each, CCCXXXVII Bde was split up: B battery and half of A battery formed C Battery in CCXXXVI Bde, and C Battery and half of A Battery formed C Battery in CCXXXV Bde. CCXXXVII Brigade's headquarters was abolished on 29 November, and the brigade ceased to exist for the rest of the war. However, the 7th Londons' war memorial in Fulham includes those later battles on the Western Front in which the two successor batteries were engaged. Lord Gorell was mortally wounded on 15 January 1917 when acting as FOO for his battery. 'A pre-war Territorial officer of high professional attainments, and at times almost reckless courage, his loss was universally mourned'.

=== 2/VII London Brigade ===
The 2/2nd London Division came into existence quickly as volunteers rushed to join up. There were no guns or horses for the artillery, but the batteries improvised dummy guns mounted on handcarts, with wooden sights and washing-lines for drag-ropes. Although the Master-General of the Ordnance, Major-General Sir Stanley von Donop, was pleased with their work and promised them the first guns available, it was not until February 1915 that some old 15-pdrs arrived for training. In March 1915 the division took the place of 1/2nd London Division in the St Albans area. At the end of May, now numbered 60th (2/2nd London) Division, it moved into Essex, with the artillery at Much Hadham. Finally, at the end of November it began to receive new 18-pdr guns and towards the end of January 1916 the division moved to the Warminster training area on Salisbury Plain.

On 28 April 1916 3/3rd Wessex Bty arrived as a fourth 18-pdr battery for 2/VII London Brigade. Then, as with the TF artillery brigades in the BEF, those in 60th Division were numbered on 17 May, 2/VII Londons taking the number CCCII Brigade (302 Bde), and the batteries were lettered. 3/3rd Wessex Bty was exchanged with 2/22nd (Howitzer) Bty from CCCIII (H) Bde (formerly2/VIII London Bde). This became D (H) Bty, and was equipped with four 4.5-inch howitzers. The BACs were also absorbed into the DAC.

==== Western Front ====
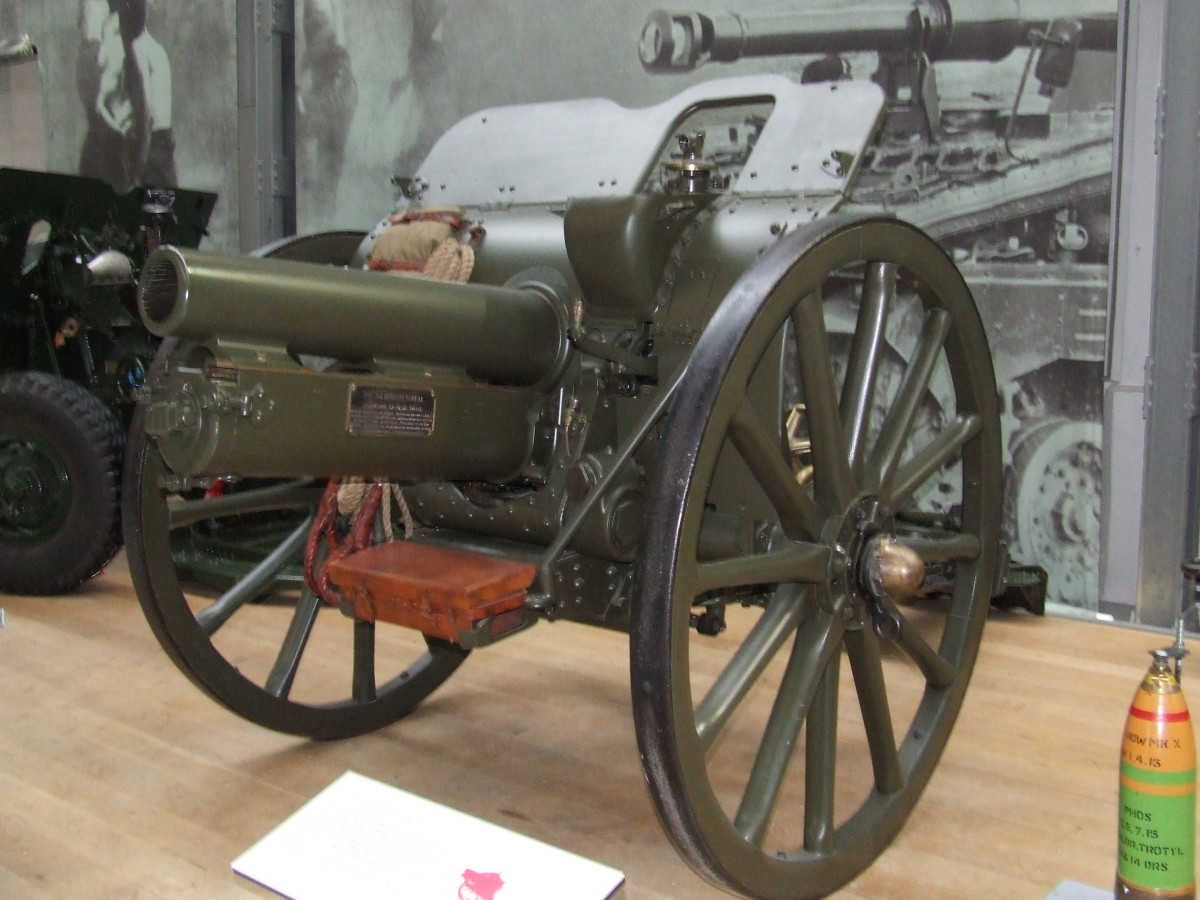
4.5-inch howitzer preserved at the Royal Artillery Museum

On 14 June 1916 orders arrived for 60th (2/2nd L) Division to move to the Western Front, and the artillery units made the crossing from Southampton to Le Havre between 22 and 26 June, with CCCII Bde under the command of Lt-Col H.M. Drake. The division concentrated in the area behind Arras by 29 June. It relieved 51st (Highland) Division in the line on 14 July, with the artillery moving into position over the next three nights. The line held was facing the same strong German positions along Vimy Ridge that 47th (2nd L) Division had faced, and there was constant mine warfare and trench raiding. The artillery was mostly engaged in suppressing troublesome German trench mortars (Minenwerfers) by firing short concentrated bombardments on specific sectors of the enemy line. Some trench raids were preceded by local wire-cutting bombardments, or by a barrage, others were 'stealth' raids.

On 30–31 August the divisional artillery underwent the same reorganisation into six-gun batteries that was going on throughout the BEF. In CCCII Bde this meant A and half of B Bty joined from CCC Bde. However, orders arrived on 1 November for the division to transfer to the Macedonian front (Salonika), where the four-gun establishment was still in force, and the batteries reverted to their original organisation; the BAC was also reformed. Once the brigade was in Macedonia, the six-gun battery establishment was introduced there as well, and this time C Bty was broken up to bring A and B Btys up to six guns each.

==== Salonika ====
Entrainment of the artillery for the embarkation port of Marseille began on 14 November and was a slow business due to lack of facilities: the drivers needed their wooden trench bridges to get their horses aboard the trains. All units were embarked and at sea by 12 December and proceeded to Salonika via Malta. The first part of the division to move out was 179th (2/4th London) Brigade, which went by sea to Katerini to prevent any move by the Greek Army against the base at Salonika. It was followed a few days later by a cross-country column comprising CCCII Bde, the transport and a Troop of the Lothians and Border Horse. Their 'Katerini Trek' was a strenuous six-day march in bad weather, across flooded rivers, but the Salonika–Katerini railway was soon repaired, making supply more straightforward The Greek troops showed no signs of interfering with the Allies' operations, and the brigade group at Katerini marched out on 5 March to join the rest of the division in the Lake Doiran sector in preparation for the Allied Spring offensive. Apart from diversionary raids, 60th (2/2nd L) Division took little part in the first part of this operation (8–9 April), most of its batteries being used to reinforce the main attack near Lake Doiran, which required several days' artillery preparation. The division did attack during the second phase of the offensive (8/9 May), but it captured its objectives by night attacks without preliminary artillery fire. A further advance was made by the division on 15 May, but the rest of the offensive having come to a standstill it was called off on 24 May. On 1 June 1917 the division was marched back to Salonika to embark for Egypt.

==== Palestine ====
On arrival at Alexandria on 19 June 1917 D (H) Bty transferred to the new 74th (Yeomanry) Division, leaving CCCII Bde with just two batteries until 10 October when 413 (H) Bty arrived to become C (H) Bty (413 (H) Bty was a New Army ('Kitchener's Army') battery formed in 1917 and equipped with four 4.5-inch howitzers). On 8 August, the brigade's CO, Lt-Col Drake, was promoted to Brigadier-General, RA, of the division and was succeeded by Lt-Col V.M. Fergusson.

From Alexandria, 60th (2/2nd L) Division moved to the Suez Canal to join the Egyptian Expeditionary Force (EEF), where its units were reorganised (the BACs were absorbed into the DAC once more) and underwent training before crossing Sinai in early July 1917. Further intensive training followed until late October, when the division made its first full-scale attack of the war, at Beersheba. In the weeks leading up to the attack artillery officers had regularly ridden close to the Beersheba defences to reconnoitre, often under fire. Concentration for the attack was carried out under cover of darkness, beginning on 20/21 October and completed on 28/29 October. The divisional artillery was divided into Right and Left groups corresponding to the two attacking brigades; CCCII Bde was part of Left Group supporting 181st (2/6th London) Brigade. The whole force moved forward under moonlight on 30/31 October, with the Royal Engineers improving the track north of Wadi ed Sabe for the artillery, which was in position by 01.30. At dawn the guns began to bombard Hill 1070, pausing at 07.00 to let the smoke and dust clear. At 08.30 the guns switched from wire-cutting to intensive bombardment, 181st Bde moving forward as the guns lifted, and taking the hill in 10 minutes. As soon as new OPs had been established on the hill the batteries galloped forward over the stony ground to begin wire-cutting on the main Turkish position. The general advance was resumed at 12.15 and 181st Bde captured its objectives easily. By 13.00 the whole of the defence works were in British hands, and that evening the Desert Mounted Corps entered Beersheba.

The next phase of the offensive involved 60th (2/2nd L) Division in an attack on Kauwukah in the Turkish Sheria position (the Battle of Hareira and Sheria) on 6 November. The attacking brigades moved forwards at 03.30 with the artillery, which began wire-cutting as soon as it was in position. Each 18-pdr battery cut two 10 yards (9.1 m) gaps in the wire by 12.15, and then began a bombardment of the enemy trench as the attack went in against heavy fire. The field guns then lifted onto the works in the second line. The whole defensive position was in the division's hands by 14.00 and it pushed patrols ahead towards Sheria and its water supply. Sheria was captured at daybreak the following morning, without artillery preparation, but afterwards there was heavy fighting, and several Turkish counter-attacks were broken up by the field guns. The infantry brigade groups continued their advance the following day, supported by their artillery groups (Fergusson's Group supporting 181st Bde in the Right Column), and entered Huj.

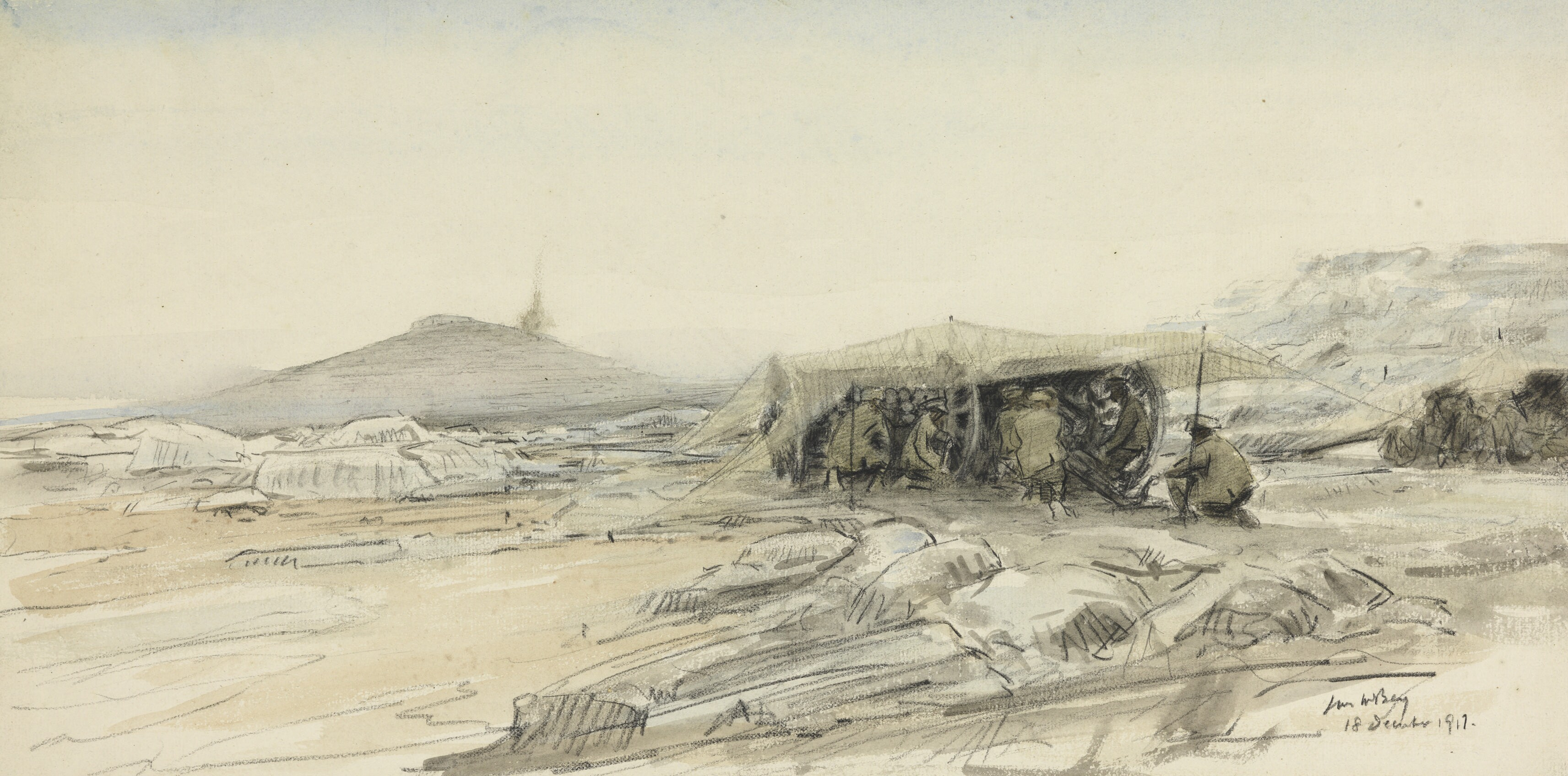
Drawing by James McBey of an RFA battery engaging Turkish batteries at Nebi Samwil

After a short rest at Huj, the division bivouacked at Gaza under heavy rain, then began a 42 miles (68 km) march through the mud to Junction Station, which it reached on 22 November. It now entered the last stage of the Battle of Nebi Samwil, where the objectives were a tangle of hill slopes, with tracks so bad that it was impossible to bring up the guns until roads had been made for them. Nebi Samwil had been captured by units of 75th Division, and the London battalions that relieved them came under fierce counter-attacks on 29 November; only the supporting British artillery fire allowed them to maintain their position. However, the way was now open to attack the final defences of Jerusalem; an encirclement was chosen, to avoid attacking the city itself. The surprise attack began on 8 December without artillery support; once progress had been made the batteries were to move up and come under command of the brigade groups. The going was tough for the gun teams, but CCCII Bde got though and eventually came into action within close rifle range of the enemy. C (H) Battery, together with C (H)/CCCI Bty, came up through Qalonye and supported 180th (2/5th London) Brigade's afternoon attack on the heights above Lifta; the hill was carried with great dash at the point of the bayonet. The division consolidated its gains that evening. The advance was resumed the following morning and the infantry fought their way into the suburbs of Jerusalem; there was little the artillery could do to support them. The Turks evacuated the city and the following morning the mayor and civic leaders surrendered the city to two sergeants of 2/19th Londons.

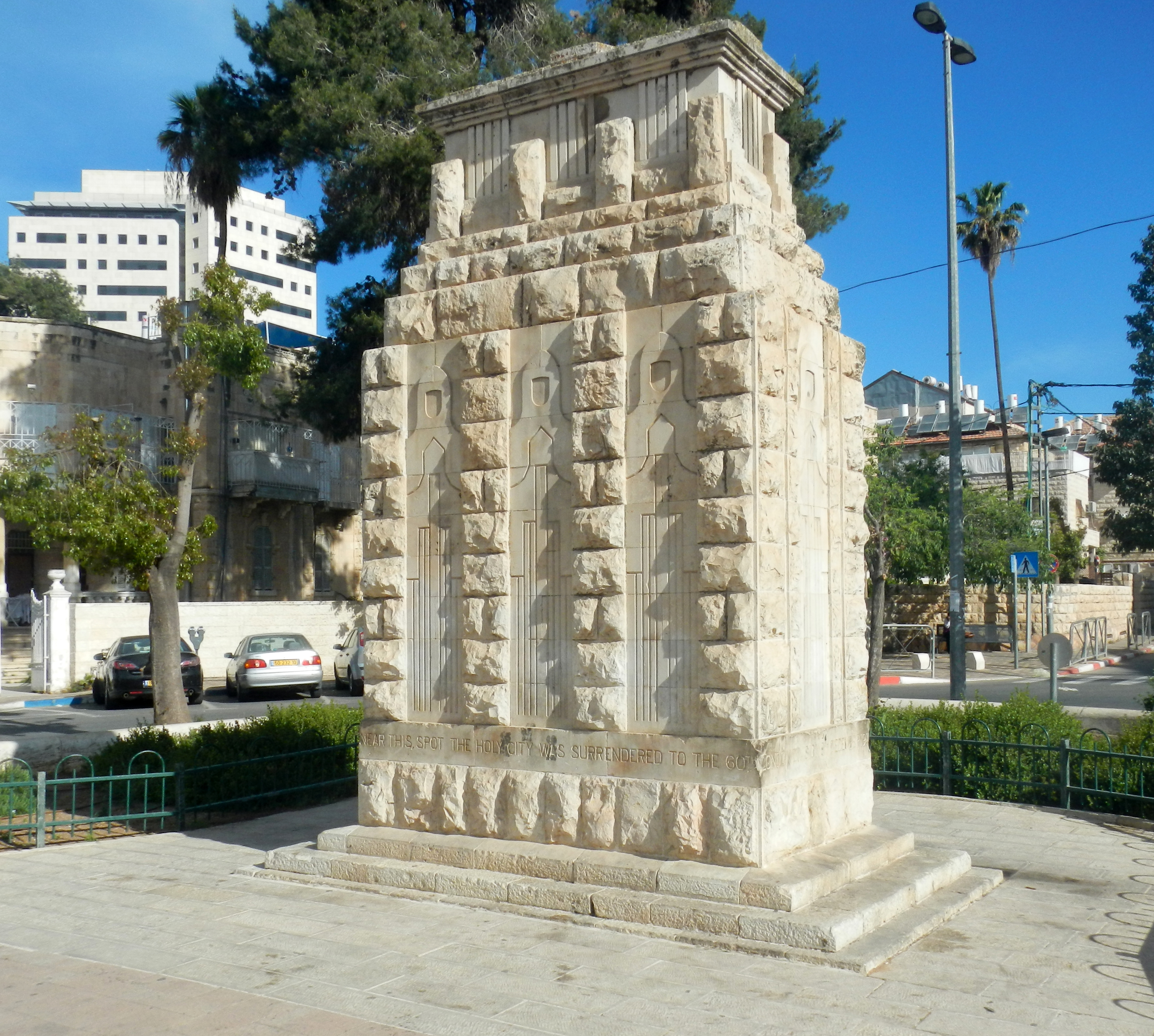
Monument to the surrender of Jerusalem to 60th (2/2nd London) Division

60th (2/2nd L) Division was then pushed forward into positions from which to defend the captured city. Turkish counter-attacks began on 22 December, and a major attack followed on the night of 26/27 December. This was beaten off and the division took the opportunity to push forward up the Nablus Road into the hills over the following days. 60th Divisional Artillery made 'extraordinary exertions' to get its guns up to support attacks that captured the heights of Tahuneh and Shab Salah on 29 December. The Nablus Road defences were then garrisoned, with CCCII Bde in reserve.

There was a pause in operations until February 1918 when the EEF moved to drive the Turks east of the Jordan. 60th (2/2nd L) Division advanced with three brigade groups, each supported by artillery, and worked its way forward between 14 and 21 February over rough country, with Turkish road demolitions needing repair before the guns could get forward. At 02.30 on 21 February 2/14th Londons (London Scottish) were ordered to Nebi Musa, which they reached by 06.00, but it took 38 hours of struggle for a battery of CCCII Bde to cover the same distance. On 21 February the Australian 1st Light Horse Brigade swept into Jericho, leaving the Turks with only small bridgeheads west of the Jordan. CCCII Brigade played no part in the Battle of Tell 'Asur that followed. 181st Brigade, with CCCII Bde (less one battery) in support, secured the line of the Wadi el Auja on 9 March. The division then crossed the river on the night of 21 March to carry out the First Transjordan raid. A Pontoon bridge was built at Ghoraniyeh, and the reinforced division advanced as far as Amman, though the field artillery could not get forward in the wet conditions, even with double teams of horses. Without artillery support the division failed to capture the Amman Citadel, and with its communications back to the Jordan threatened, the raiding force withdrew on 30–31 March.

The EEF settled down to defend its Jordan bridgeheads; CCCI Brigade was posted to support the Australian 2nd Light Horse Brigade and Imperial Camel Corps garrisoning a bridgehead at the Wadi el Auja confluence. The Turks attacked the Auja bridgehead on 11 April but were driven off, the artillery observers on the high ground to the west having 'an admirable view'. Later that month the 60th (2/2nd L) Division played its part in the Second Transjordan raid. CCCII Brigade came up in support, but while the mounted troops reached Es Salt the Londoners could not break through the Turkish positions in the foothills, and the raiding force was withdrawn on 4 May. 60th (2/2nd L) Division then went into Corps Reserve for a rest.

As a result of the German spring offensive and consequent British manpower crisis on the Western Front, 60th (2/2nd L) Division was changed between 25 May and 1 August to an Indian Army establishment, releasing three-quarters of its London infantry units for service in France and replacing them with Indian units; however, this did not affect the artillery, which continued to serve with the division in Palestine.

For the final offensive in Palestine, the Battle of Megiddo, 60th Division was transferred to the coastal sector where the breakthrough was to be made. The opening attack (the Battle of Sharon) went in at 04.30 on 19 September behind an intense artillery bombardment. As soon as the barrage programme was complete, the artillery moved up behind the infantry, who had gained their first objectives. The division then continued its advance as the Turks streamed away in retreat. The 60th Division advanced for the next three days against enemy rearguards until it ran ahead of its supplies.

After the battle the pursuit was carried out by the mounted troops and 60th Division was left behind on salvage duties. It was still in the rear areas when the Armistice of Mudros ended the war with Turkey on 31 October. The division then went back to Alexandria where demobilisation began and units were gradually reduced to cadres, though still with some responsibility for internal security and seizing illegal arms. The division ceased to exist on 31 May 1919.

== Interwar ==
The TF was reconstituted on 7 February 1920 and 7th London Bde, RFA, was reformed at Fulham High Street. When the TF was reorganised as the new Territorial Army (TA) the following year, the brigade was redesignated 64th (7th London) Brigade, RFA, with the following organisation:

- HQ at Fulham
- 253 (18th London) Battery at Fulham
- 254 (19th London) Battery at Shepherd's Bush
- 255 (20th London) Battery at Fulham
- 256 (17th London) Battery (Howitzer) at Porteus Road, Paddington (transferred from the former 5th London Bde)

When the RFA was subsumed into the Royal Artillery (RA) on 1 June 1924, its units were redesignated as 'Field Brigades, RA'. In the reformed TA, 64th (7th London) Field Bde was again part of 47th (2nd London) Division.

In 1925 Lt-Col Claude Liardet transferred to the regiment as CO from the command of 106th (Lancashire Yeomanry) Field Bde. He was promoted to colonel in 1929 and appointed commander, Royal Artillery (CRA) of 47th Division in 1934. In 1935 most of 47th (2nd London) Division was converted into 1st Anti-Aircraft Division and the remaining London units including 64th Fd Bde were organised with those of 56th (1st London) Division into a single London Division.

When the RA adopted the term 'regiment' instead of the obsolete 'brigade' for a lieutenant-colonel's command, the unit became 64th (7th London) Field Regiment, RA, on 1 November 1938.

After the Munich Crisis the TA was rapidly doubled in size. On 1 May 1939, 64th (7th London) Field Regiment created a duplicate 117th Field Regiment, RA, at Parsons Green, Fulham, by separating 255 (20th London) and 256 (17th London) Btys (it was officially given the '7th London' subtitle in 1942). Field regiments were now organised as Regimental HQ (RHQ) and two batteries each of 12 guns. These were 18-pounders of First World War pattern, though now equipped with pneumatic tyres and towed by motorised gun tractors. There was a programme to replace the 18-pdr barrels with that of the new 25-pounder coming into service, giving the hybrid 18/25-pounder. 64th Field Rgt remained with 1st London Division while 117th formed part of the newly-formed 2nd London Division, both divisions being organised as motor divisions.

== Second World War ==
56th (London) Division's formation sign featured Dick Whittington's cat.

=== 64th (7th London) Field Regiment ===
==== Home Defence ====
During the Phoney War period 1st London Division (commanded by the 7th Londons' former CO, now Maj-Gen Claude Liardet) was stationed in South East England as part of Eastern Command. On 5 December 1939 64th Fd Rgt sent a cadre of trained officers and men to St Leonards-on-Sea in Sussex form the basis of a new 56th Heavy Regiment (see below).

When the defences of the UK were reorganised after the Dunkirk evacuation, the division was reformed as a conventional infantry division, defending the prime invasion area from the Isle of Sheppey in north Kent to Rye, East Sussex, as part of XII Corps, even though it was only partially equipped (its two field artillery regiments had 11 x 18/25-pounders, 4 x 18-pounders and 8 x 4.5-inch howitzers between them, and it had no anti-tank guns). It was redesignated 56th (London) Division in November 1940.

It was only in the autumn of 1940 that the RA began producing enough battery staffs to start the process of changing regiments from a two-battery to a three-battery organisation. (Three 8-gun batteries were easier to handle, and it meant that each infantry battalion in a brigade could be closely associated with its own battery.) 64th Field Rgt formed 444 Bty on 1 April 1941.

56th (L) Division remained in Sussex until April 1942, when it moved to XI Corps in East Anglia. Then in June 1942 it came under direct War Office control as it was prepared for overseas service.

==== Iraq and North Africa ====
In August 1942 the division embarked for the Middle East, arriving in Iraq to reinforce Persia and Iraq Command (PAIC) in November. By the time it arrived, the threats to the Persian oilfields had diminished with the British victory at El Alamein and the lack of German progress at the Battle of Stalingrad. The troops in PAIC were, therefore, free to undergo intensive training, and 56th (L) Division was selected for the planned Allied invasion of Sicily (Operation Husky).

This involved a move from Kirkuk via Palestine and Egypt to join X Corps of Eighth Army in Tunisia, covering approximately 3,200 miles (5,100 km) between 19 March and 19 April 1943. As soon as it arrived it was thrown into the last stages of the Tunisian Campaign, because Gen Montgomery did not want an untried division in Husky. Given the task of capturing Tarhuna during the night of 28/29 April, it succeeded but was driven off the position the following morning. Montgomery realised that the division needed time to learn battlecraft. It went into action again during the final advance on Tunis (Operation Vulcan), moving north to meet 6th Armoured Division of First Army coming south, whose leading troops were able to spot for X Corps' guns via 56th (L) Division's wireless net.

==== Salerno to Anzio ====
Because of Montgomery's doubts, 56th Division was not in fact used in Operation Husky. Instead, it moved back to Tripoli in Libya for further training, and then put to sea on 1 September for the invasion of mainland Italy, landing at Salerno on 9 September (Operation Avalanche). H-Hour was at 03.30, the division's leading infantry landing craft touched down at 03.35 covered by naval gunfire, and 64th Fd Rgt's guns began landing at 06.00. The whole regiment was in action at 17.15.

Over the next few days the division fought its way forward to extend the beachhead against strong German counter-attacks, and the divisional artillery was heavily engaged in defensive fire (DF) tasks. X Corps began its advance out of the beachhead on the night of 22/23 September with massive artillery support and reached Naples on 30 September.

By 11 October, the division was on the Volturno Line but failed to cross the river the following day and had to wait until 16 October before it could cross and begin the pursuit through rough country beyond. This brought the division to the Bernhardt Line, where 64th Fd Rgt lent support to the attack of 201st Guards Brigade up 'Bare Arse Ridge' on 6 November during the Battle of Monte Camino. Attacks at Monte Camino continued in early December, with large numbers of guns in support, until the division seized the heights on 6 December.

56th (L) Division was next tasked with capturing a bridgehead across the Garigliano using strong artillery support (400 rounds per gun were supplied for the division's 25-pounders). The attack on the night of 17/18 January 1944 was successful and by morning the leading battalions were across and attacking with plenty of artillery support. The division began its breakout from the bridgehead on 23 January, but at the end of the month was ordered to pull out and go by sea to reinforce the Anzio beachhead. By 15 February the whole division had arrived and taken over part of the line under VI US Corps, in time to beat off the German counter-attack (Operation Fischfang or 'Catching Fish').

Trench warfare in the Anzio bridgehead continued for months. On 28 February the German I Parachute Corps began an offensive against 56th (L) Division that produced no change in the line. When the attack was widened to the front of 3rd US Division the following day, accompanied by unusually heavy support from field artillery, the whole artillery in VI Corps brought down a pre-emptive counter-preparation programme. Although this was too late to catch the German troops as they formed up, the attack made no real impression on the Allied defences. 56th (L) Division was by now so weak that it was relieved and on 28 March went by sea to Egypt for recuperation.

==== Italy again ====
56th (L) Division returned to Italy on 17 July 1944 and was assigned to V Corps for the attack on the Gothic Line (Operation Olive). When the offensive opened on 25 August 1944, V Corps was still moving up, and 56th (L) Division was its reserve, but its artillery was sent on ahead to strengthen the Corps artillery. Once the Corps had broken into the German positions, 56th (L) Division was used to widen the breach on 1 September, and then on 3 September to lead the pursuit, taking Monte Maggiore before opposition increased at the Gemmano–Coriano high ground. There followed hard methodical fighting to clear the Germans off successive ridge lines (the Battle of San Marino).

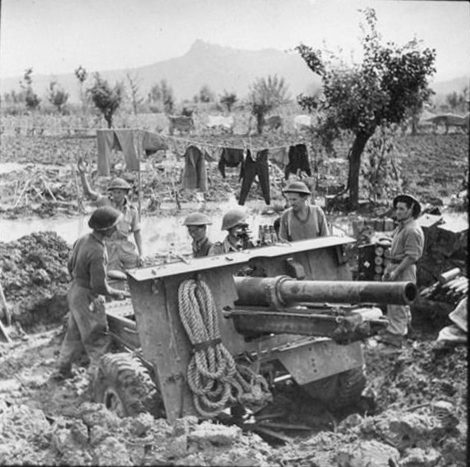
25-pounder and crew in a waterlogged position across the Rubicon, October 1944

On the night of 27/28 September 56th (L) Division attacked Savignano sul Rubicone on the Fiumicino river, supported by a 90-minute barrage fired by the heavily reinforced divisional artillery. Nevertheless, the attack failed, as did attempts to renew it on 29/30 September and 1 October. Later in October, the badly weakened 56th (L) Division was relieved in the line. While the infantry were recuperating, 56th (L) Division's artillery was brought up to reinforce V Corps' fire-plan for the capture of Forlì and the attempted crossings of the Montone on 8 November.

56th (L) Division returned to the fighting in December to cover the Lamone crossing (2–13 December) and then to clear the ground between the Lamone and the Senio, forcing its way into Sant'Andrea on 31 December. However, ammunition shortages limited the use of the artillery.

For the Spring 1945 offensive in Italy (Operation Grapeshot), 56th (L) Division was responsible for the operations on Lake Comacchio to outflank the Senio line (5/6, 10/11 and 13 April) allowing it to breach the Argenta Gap (15–19 April) despite the shortage of artillery ammunition. Once through the gap, 56th (L) Division drove on through German rearguards to the Po, arriving on 25 April and crossing immediately. The division reached Venice on 29 April. Here it was halted due to shortage of fuel. The Surrender of Caserta came into force on 2 May, ending hostilities in the Italian theatre.

56th (L) Division was made responsible for protecting lines of communication to the disputed city of Trieste in the immediate aftermath of the fighting. 64th (7th London) Field Regiment was placed in suspended animation on 15 May 1946.

=== 117th (7th London) Field Regiment ===
47th (London) Division's formation sign, a play on Bow Bells

The regiment served with the new 2nd London Division in the United Kingdom for the whole war. During the Phoney War period it was stationed to defend London as part of Eastern Command. However, after the Dunkirk the poorly-equipped division was sent to South Wales to continue its training under Western Command. It was redesignated 47th (London) Division in November 1940. 117th Field Rgt formed its third battery HQ, 482 Bty, on 21 January 1941, while it was stationed at Tenby in Pembrokeshire, and its '7th London' subtitle was authorised on 17 February 1942.

By May 1941, 47th (L) Division was back in the front line of anti-invasion defences, stationed in West Sussex under IV Corps. However, from December 1941, 47th (L) Division was no longer considered part of the field force and was placed on a lower establishment, though it remained in the static defences of the Hampshire and Dorset District.

When 21st Army Group was formed in July 1943 to prepare for the Allied invasion of Normandy (Operation Overlord), 117th Fd Rgt was assigned to I Corps as a self-propelled field artillery regiment, but it does not seem to have served in this role and remained with 47th (L) Division.

After D-Day and the draining away of men and units to Normandy, 47th (L) Division was dispersed in August 1944. It was reformed as a reserve division with a training and draft finding role in September 1944, when 117th Field Rgt quickly rejoined. After 173rd Field Rgt was disbanded in January 1945, two of its batteries joined 117th as holding units: 138 Bty on 23 January and 156 Bty on 12 May. 117th (7th London) Field Regiment and all five batteries were placed in suspended animation on 23 March 1946.

=== 56th Heavy Regiment ===
==== Home Defence ====
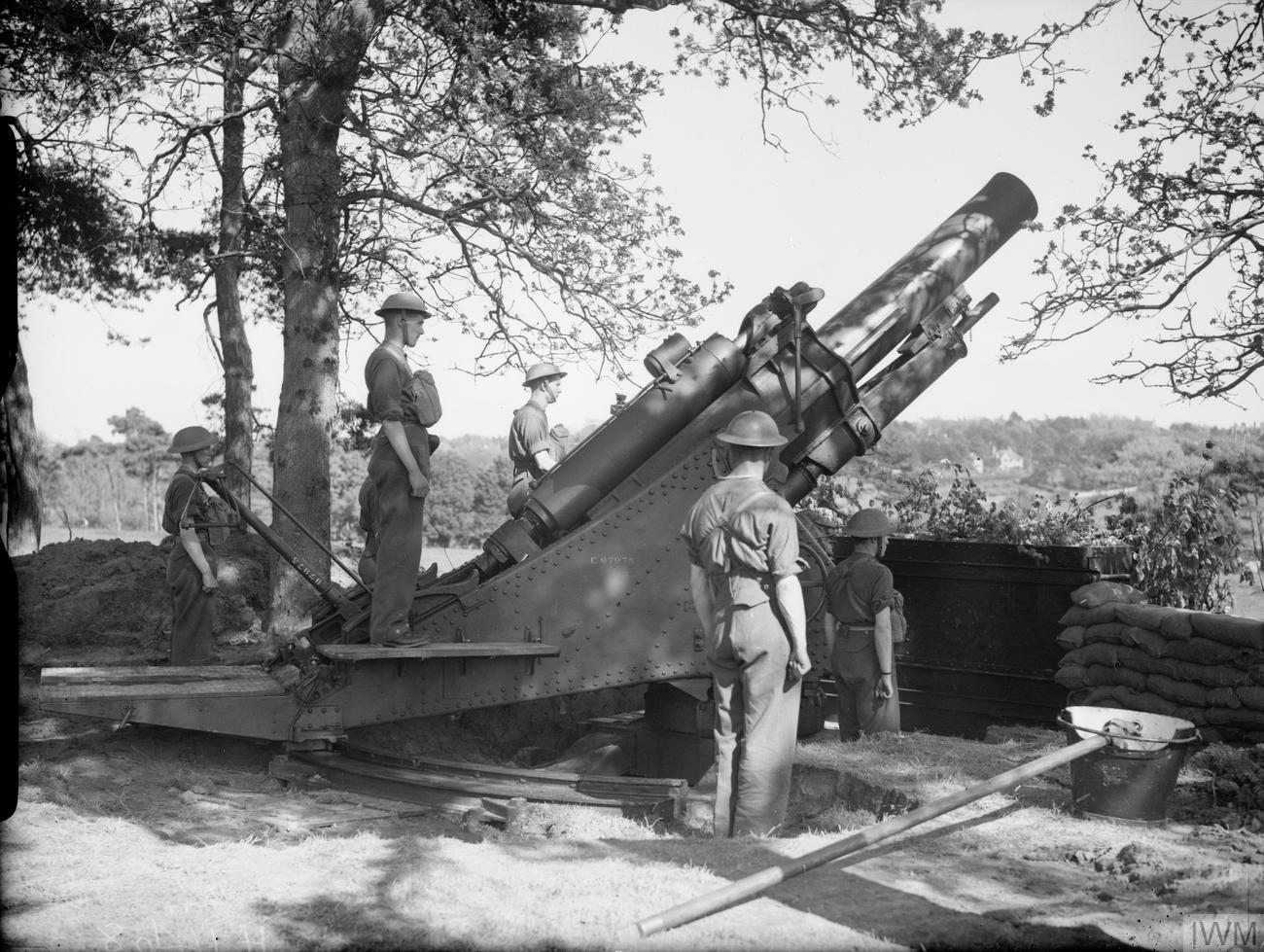
Gunners of 56th Heavy Regiment manning a Mk II 9.2-inch howitzer at Hastings, May 1940

56th Heavy Regiment was formed at St Leonards-on-Sea, near Hastings, on 2 January 1940 from the cadre provided the previous month by 64th (7th London) Field Rgt. It was formed of four batteries, A, B, C and D, which were redesignated P, Q, R and S respectively on 11 March 1942. The regiment never received the '7th London' subtitle, but was included on the 7th Londons' regimental war memorial after WWII. In May 1940 it was photographed at Hastings manning 6-inch guns and 9.2-inch howitzers of First World War vintage. The 9.2-inch was an effective but relatively immobile siege gun. The regiment was serving in Eastern Command of Home Forces, and transferred to South-Eastern Command when that was split off in 1941.

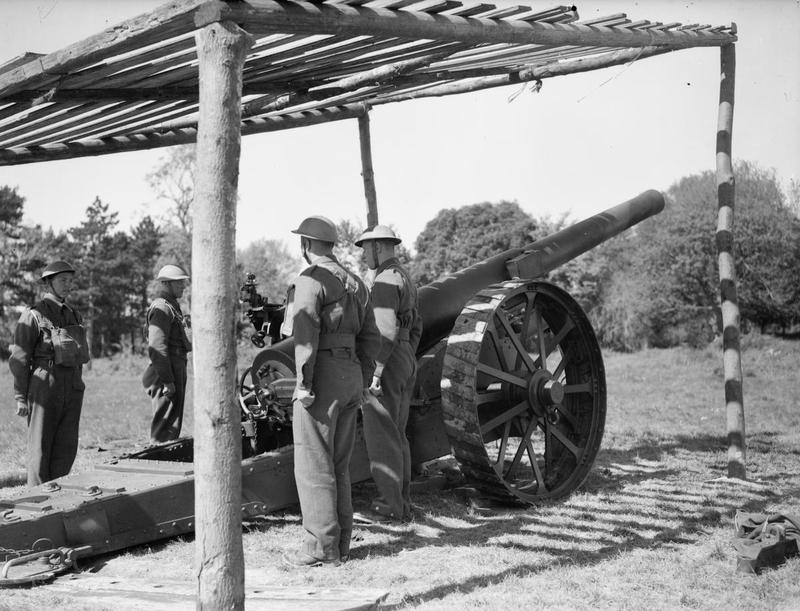
Gunners of 56th Heavy Regiment manning a 6-inch gun at Hastings, May 1940

The 7.2-inch howitzer (a relined 8-inch howitzer from the First World War) began to be issued to heavy regiments in 1942, and by then the regiment had its own signal section of the Royal Corps of Signals and Light Aid Detachment of the Royal Electrical and Mechanical Engineers, ready for mobile warfare. In October 1942 the regiment was assigned to First Army preparing for the landings in North Africa (Operation Torch). On 1 January 1943 the four batteries were redesignated 15, 17, 18 and 19 Hvy Btys.

==== Tunisia ====
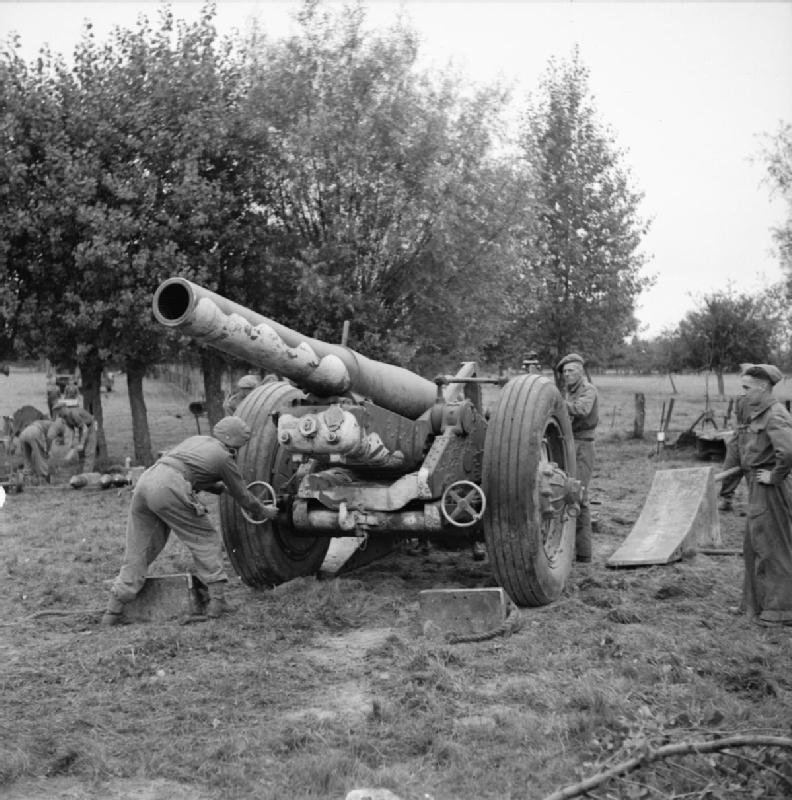
A 7.2-inch howitzer going into action; note the wooden ramps to absorb the recoil of the World-War I-era gun carriage.

56th Heavy Regiment landed in North Africa with 16 x 7.2-inch howitzers and reached the front line in Tunisia in mid-January 1943 – the first Royal Artillery regiment of heavy artillery to go overseas since Dunkirk. It formed part of 1st Army Group Royal Artillery (1st AGRA) a new kind of formation developed by the gunnery tacticians as powerful artillery brigades, usually comprising three medium regiments and one heavy regiment, which could be rapidly moved about the battlefield, and had the punch to destroy enemy artillery. The first AGRA HQs had been formed in August 1942 and officially sanctioned in November in time for Torch. 1st AGRA came into action in February 1943 on XIX French Corps' front.

56th Heavy Rgt was with V Corps to support 78th Division's preparatory attacks in early April for the subsequent Battle of Longstop Hill.

==== Italy ====
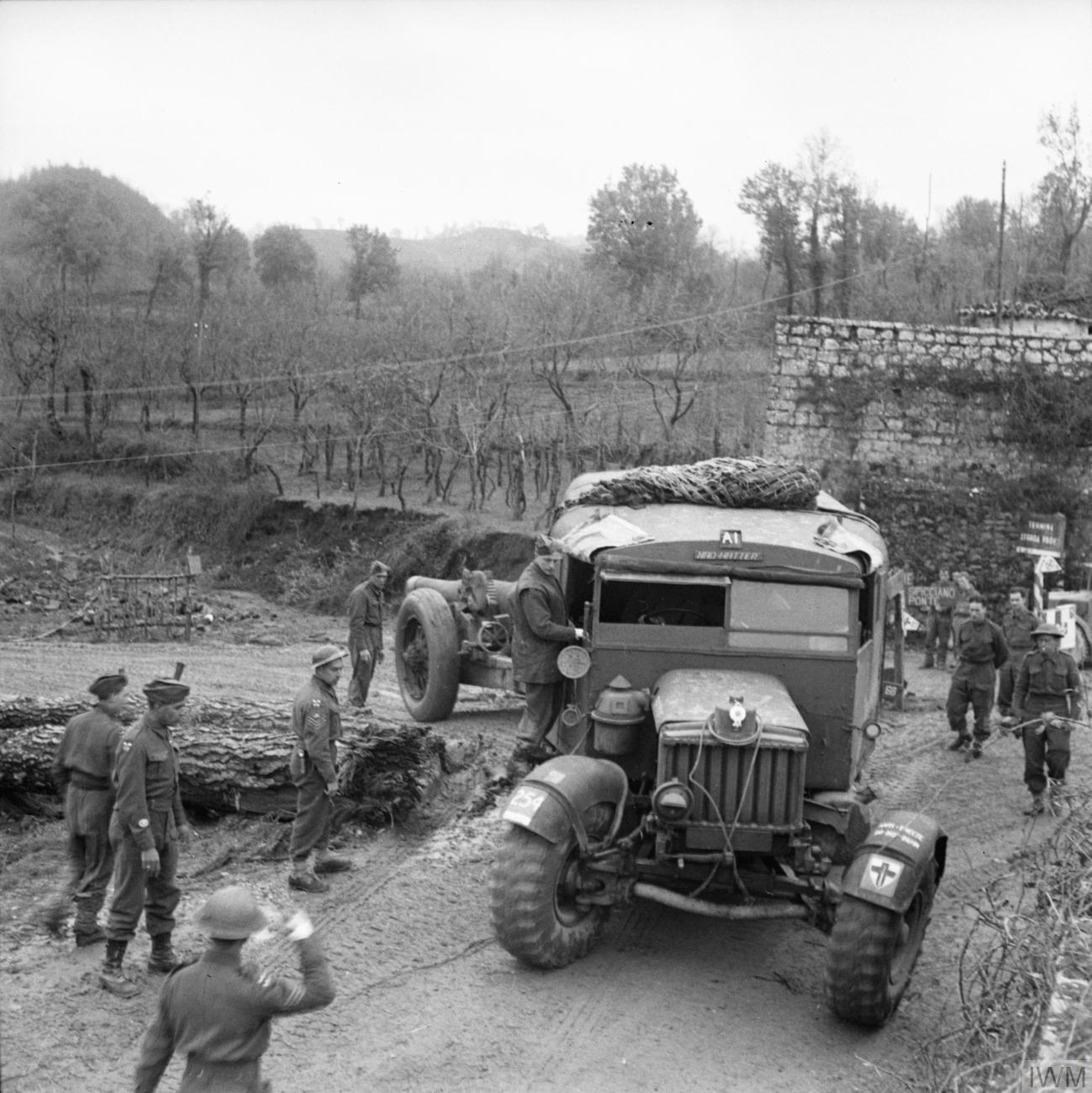
Scammell Pioneer tractor towing a 7.2-inch howitzer of 18 Bty, 56th Heavy Regiment, round a tight corner in 46th Division's sector, 23 December 1943

56th Heavy Regiment served in 2nd AGRA during the Italian campaign. For example, it was alongside 56th (L) Division's guns firing in support of 201st Guards Brigade's attack on 'Bare Arse Ridge' on 6 November during the Battle of Monte Camino. It supported 56th (L) Division again during the assault crossing of the Garigliano in January 1944.

In February 1944, 2nd AGRA was sent without 56th Heavy Rgt to support the New Zealand Corps. By late May, 2nd AGRA, with 56th Heavy Rgt once more under command, was supporting X Corps' advance after Operation Diadem had broken through the German Winter Line, and the subsequent pursuit to Lake Trasimeno and advance to Florence. It continued with X Corps during Operation Olive to breach the Gothic Line.

==== North West Europe ====
In early 1945 Operation Goldflake began to transfer selected British and Canadian forces from the Italian Front to reinforce 21st Army Group for its final offensive into Germany. 56th Heavy Rgt was one of the units transferred in an operation that involved a sea voyage to Marseille and then an overland journey to Belgium. This was not completed until after the crossing of the Rhine in late March, and the units saw little action in the final stages of the campaign.

When the war in Europe ended on VE Day, 56th Heavy Rgt was in The Netherlands with 1st Canadian AGRA. By now it had adopted the new standard organisation of two batteries of 4 x 7.2-inch howitzers and two of 4 x 155 mm guns (the US-made 'Long Tom'). On 7 May the regiment parked its guns at Arnhem aerodrome and returned its ammunition to the supply column. The personnel were then moved through liberated towns to Beverwijk in North Holland, where they established a concentration area for surrendered German troops and equipment. The regiment also took over the coastal defences from their German garrisons.

The regiment served in British Army of the Rhine after the war ended, until it was disbanded between 16 and 27 March 1946.

== Postwar ==
When the TA was reformed on 1 January 1947 the regiment was reconstituted at Fulham as 264 (7th London) Field Regiment; at the same time 117th Field Rgt was formally disbanded. The regiment served with 44th (Home Counties) Division.

In 1961 the regiment was amalgamated with 290 (City of London) Field Rgt, 353 (London) Medium Rgt and 452 (London) Heavy Anti-Aircraft Rgt to form 254 (City of London) Field Regiment, to which the regiment contributed P (7th London) Bty at Fulham High Street. 254 (City of London) Rgt in turn was reduced into S (City of London) Bty in the Greater London Regiment, Royal Artillery, in the Territorial and Army Volunteer Reserve in 1967.

== First-hand accounts ==
- There are a number of accounts from 64th (7th London) Field Regiment archived at BBC People's War.
- The comedian and writer Spike Milligan served in 56th Heavy Regiment and wrote extensively about it in his humorous autobiographies.

== Honorary colonels ==
The following served as honorary colonel of the 7th Londons:

- Maj Oswald Magniac, formerly of the Westminster Dragoons, appointed 11 February 1922
- Lt the Hon D.W.J. North, MC, formerly of the 19th Hussars, appointed 21 April 1934
- Maj-Gen Sir Claude Liardet, DSO, TD, former CO, appointed 16 October 1937

== Memorials ==
7th County of London Brigade, RFA, is listed on the City and County of London Troops Memorial in front of the Royal Exchange, with architectural design by Sir Aston Webb and sculpture by Alfred Drury. The left-hand (northern) figure flanking this memorial depicts a Royal Artilleryman representative of the various London Artillery units.

Each unit listed also had a brass plaque depicting the memorial: the 7th London Brigade's is in the Parish Memorial Garden at All Saints Church, Fulham, together with the regiment's own memorials. The 1914-18 memorial (carrying 139 names) include battle honours for the Western Front after 1/VII Bde had formally ceased to exist, and those for 2/VII Bde in Palestine. The 64th Field, 117th Field and 56th Heavy regiments are all included on the 1939-45 memorial.

Two wooden memorial crosses erected at High Wood and Eaucourt l'Abbaye by 47th (2nd London) Division in 1916 were replaced in stone in 1925. The restored wooden crosses were preserved at the Duke of York's Headquarters in Chelsea (the former divisional HQ), and are now at Connaught House, the HQ of the London Irish Rifles in Camberwell.

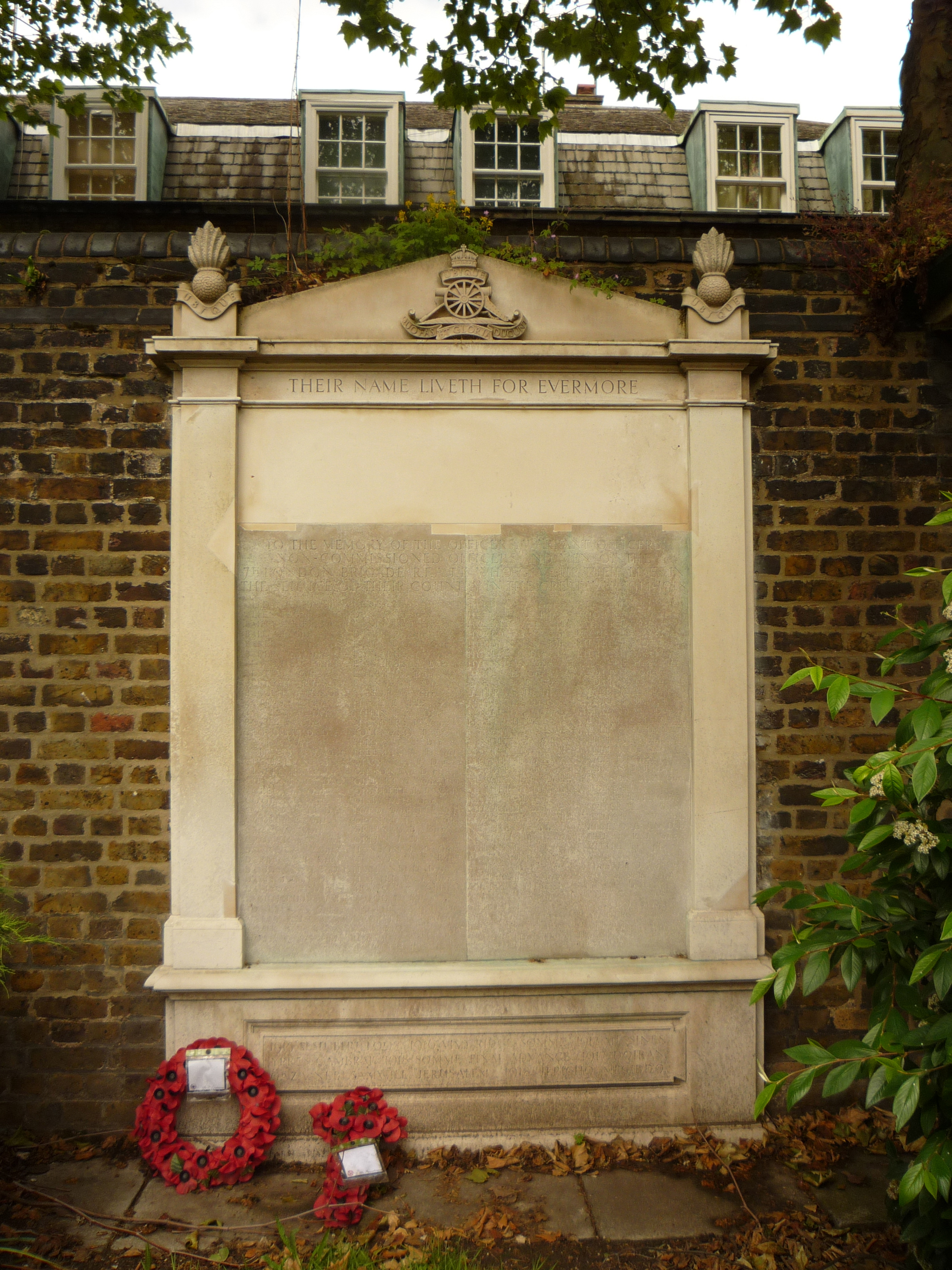
First World War memorial to the 7th London Artillery in the churchyard of All Saints Church, Fulham, in 2012

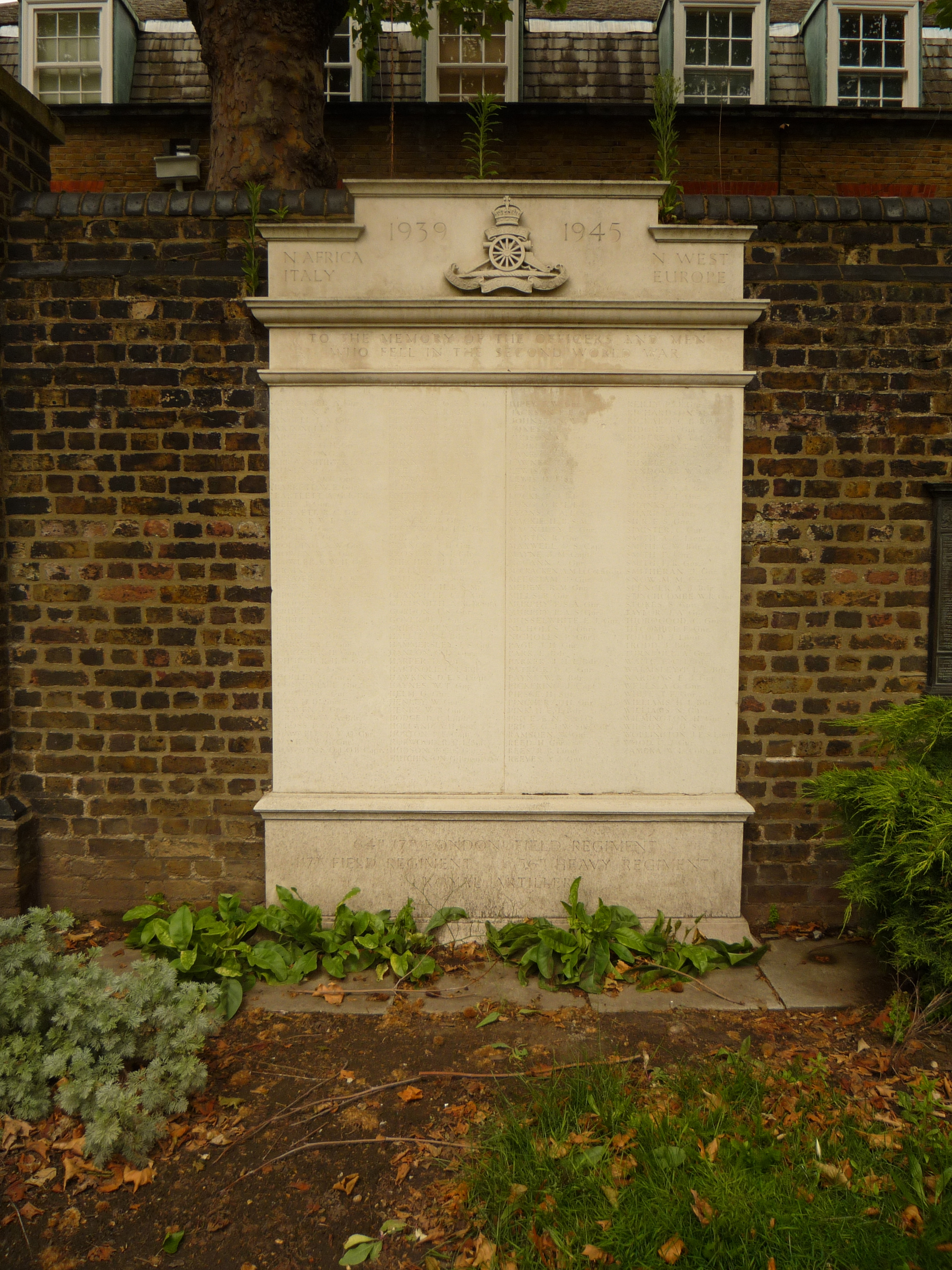
Second World War memorial to the 7th London Artillery in the churchyard of All Saints Church, Fulham, in 2012

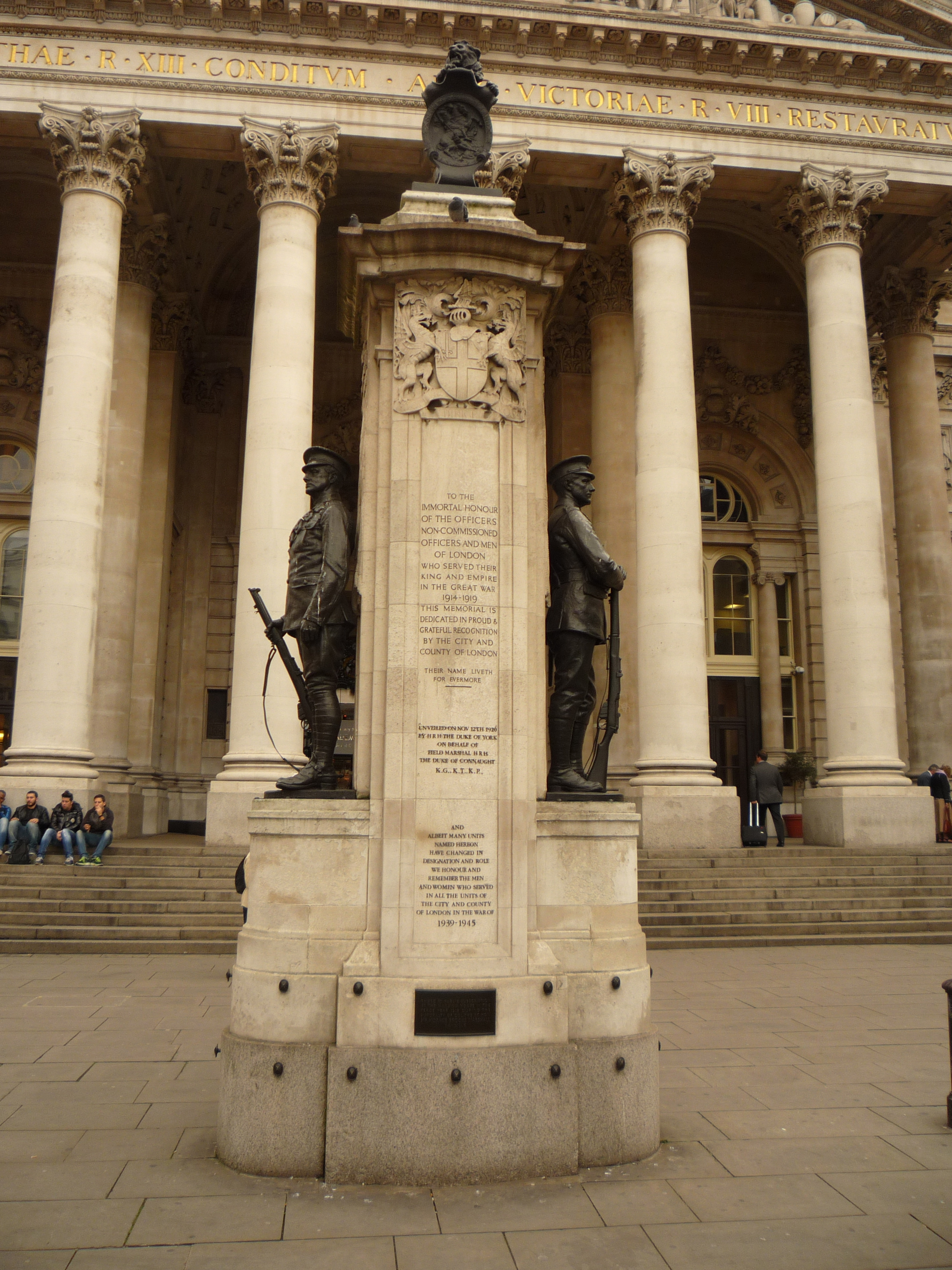
London Troops Memorial in 2013

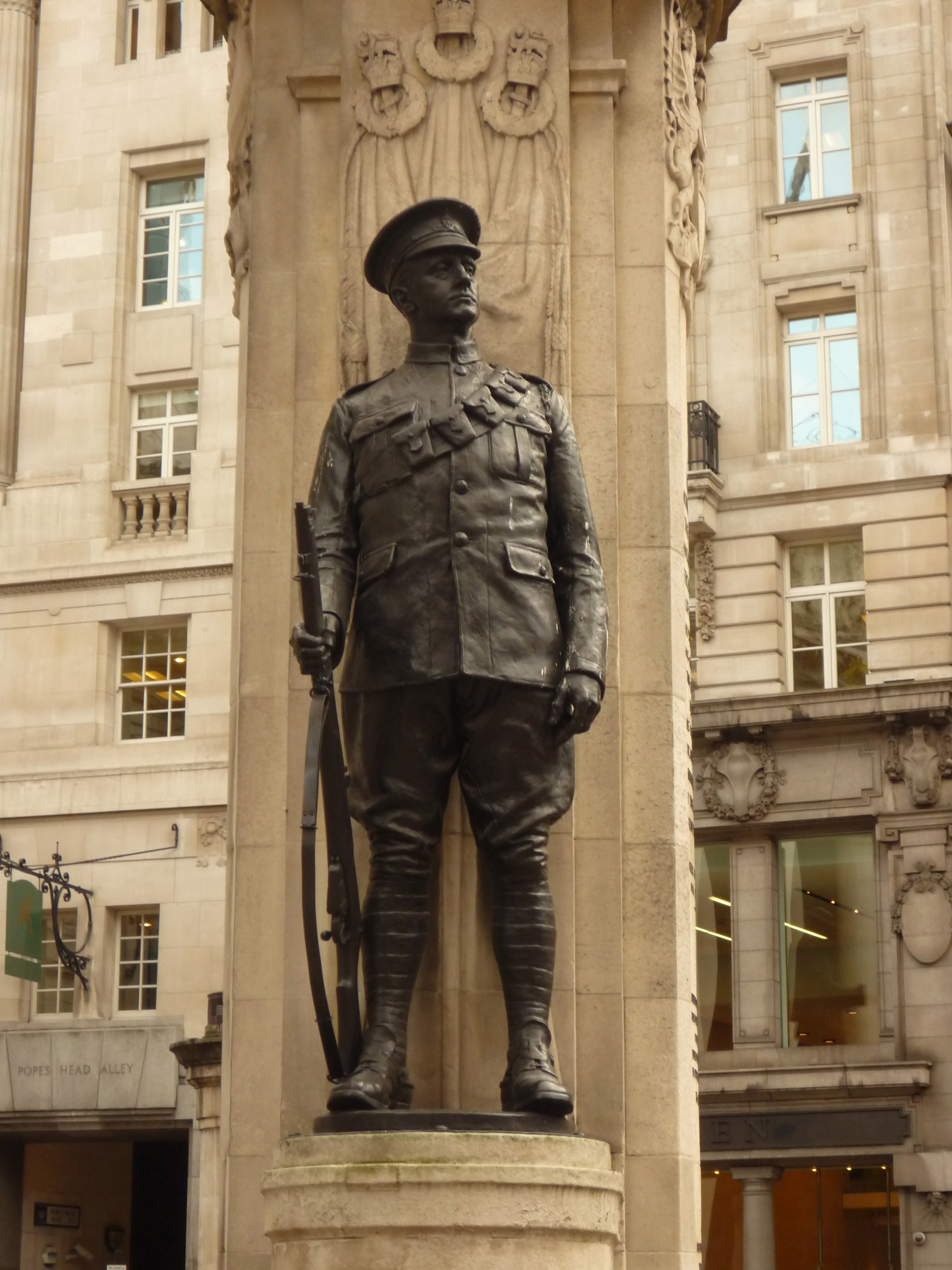
The artillery figure on the London Troops Memorial
