= Percy Commings =

British Army officer

Major-General Percy Commings CB CMG DSO
- Born: 1880
- Died: 1958 (aged 77−78)
- Military career
- Allegiance: United Kingdom
- Branch: British Army
- Rank: Major-General
- Service number: 922
- Unit: Queen's Royal Regiment (West Surrey)
- Commands: Rangoon Brigade; 56th (London) Infantry Division
- Conflicts: First World War
- Awards: Companion of the Order of the Bath; Companion of the Order of St Michael and St George; Distinguished Service Order

Major-General Percy Ryan Conway Commings, CB, CMG, DSO (1880–1958) was a British Army officer.

== Military career ==
Commings was commissioned into the Queen's Royal Regiment (West Surrey) on 7 May 1898.

He saw action during the First World War for which he was appointed a Companion of the Distinguished Service Order.

He was promoted to major general in June 1933 and went on to become commander of the Rangoon Brigade in June 1931 and General Officer Commanding 56th (London) Infantry Division in June 1934 before retiring in June 1938.

He was colonel of the South Staffordshire Regiment from 1935 to 1946.

== Family ==
He married Emily Maude Frederica Wilson; they had a son and two daughters.

Military offices
Preceded by Winston Dugan	GOC 56th (London) Infantry Division; 1934–1938	Succeeded by Claude Liardet
