= Claude Liardet =

Major-General Sir Claude Liardet KBE CB DSO TD DL
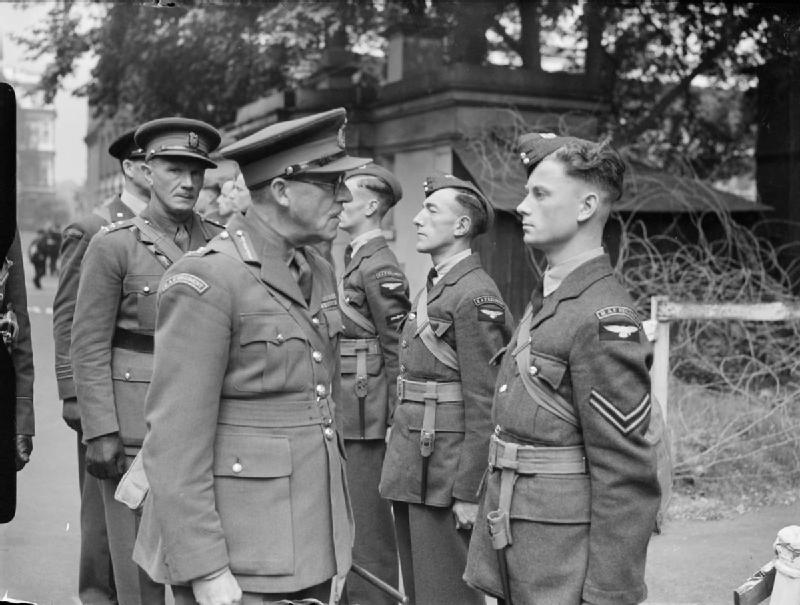
- Major-General Liardet, commandant of the RAF Regiment, inspecting a contingent of the regiment in London
- Born: 26 September 1881; Liverpool, Lancashire, England
- Died: 5 March 1966 (aged 84); Southampton, Hampshire, England
- Military career
- Allegiance: United Kingdom
- Branch: Territorial Army
- Service years: 1899–1945
- Rank: Major-General
- Service number: 7191
- Unit: Royal Artillery
- Commands: RAF Regiment (1942–1945); 56th (London) Infantry Division (1940–1941); 64th (7th London) Field Brigade, RA (1929–1933); 106th (Lancashire Yeomanry) Brigade, RFA (1922–1927); Lancashire and Cheshire Coast Brigade RA (1919–1922)
- Conflicts: First World War; Second World War
- Awards: Knight Commander of the Order of the British Empire; Companion of the Order of the Bath; Distinguished Service Order; Mentioned in Despatches (4); Territorial Decoration
- Other work: Director of Bevington, Vaizey, and Foster Ltd

Major-General Sir Claude Francis Liardet, KBE, CB, DSO, TD, DL (26 September 1881 – 5 March 1966) was an insurance broker, businessman and a long-serving artillery officer in Britain's part-time Territorial Army before becoming the first Commandant General of the RAF Regiment.

== Early life ==
Claude Liardet was born on 26 September 1881, the son of Commander Henry Maughan Liardet of Her Majesty's Indian Navy. He was educated at Bedford School.

== Military career ==
Liardet was commissioned into the part-time 1st Lancashire Volunteer Artillery in Liverpool on 21 June 1899. The unit became the Lancashire and Cheshire Royal Garrison Artillery when the Territorial Force (TF) was formed in 1908 and Liardet served in the First World War, during which he was mentioned in despatches four times and awarded the Distinguished Service Order. In 1919 he became commanding officer (CO) of his unit, which became the Lancashire & Cheshire Coast Brigade, RGA when the TF was converted into the Territorial Army (TA) in 1921. He transferred as CO to the 106th (Lancashire Yeomanry) Brigade, Royal Field Artillery in 1923.

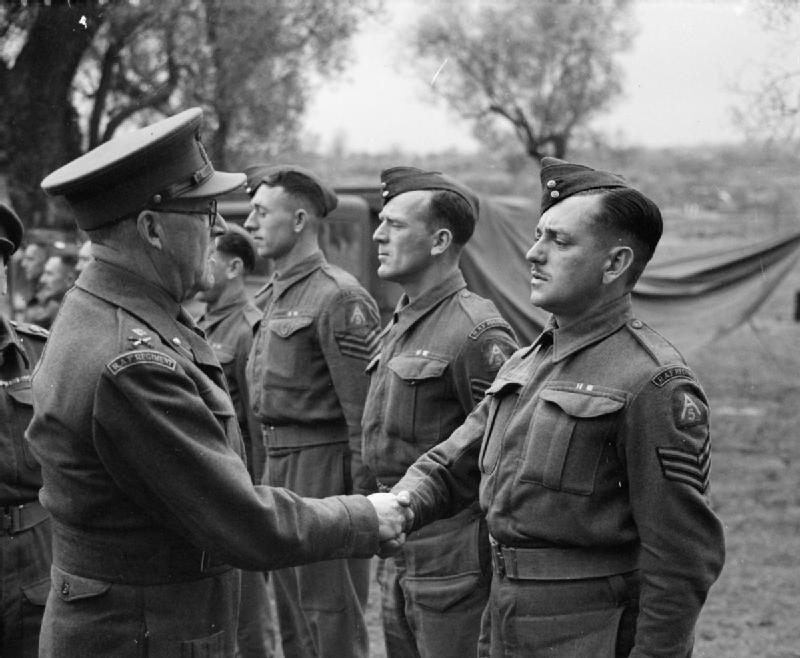
Major-General C F Liardet, Commandant of the RAF Regiment inspects the NCOs of No. 2788 Squadron at Cassino, Italy. He is seen here shaking hands with Sergeant Curtiss from Hull.

In 1929 Liardet became CO of 64th (7th London) Field Brigade, Royal Artillery, serving in 47th (2nd London) Division and in 1934 he was promoted to Commander Royal Artillery (CRA) of that division. When the 47th Division was disbanded in 1936 he transferred as CRA to the combined London) Division (later the 56th (London) Infantry Division). Liardet was promoted to command the 56th Division in the rank of major general in 1938 – a rare honour for a TA officer – and held that post during the early part of the Second World War.

In 1941 Liardet was appointed Inspector General of Aerodrome Defence and Director General of Ground Defence at the Air Ministry. In 1942 he became Commandant-General of the RAF Regiment until the end of the war, when he retired.

He was appointed Honorary Colonel of the 64th (7th London) Field Brigade, RA, on 16 October 1937.

== Business career ==
Liardet was a director of the Lloyd's of London insurance brokers Bevington, Vaizey, and Foster Ltd.

== Family life ==
Liardet married on 11 January 1906 to Dorothy Hopper, they had a son Henry and a daughter, Dorothy Marie. He remarried on 25 May 1928 to Dorothy Clare Borrett and they had a son. Liardet died in 1966.

== Notes ==
Military offices
| Preceded by Percy Commings | GOC London Division; 1938–1939 | Succeeded by Post redesignated 1st London Division |
| New title New post | GOC 1st London Division; 1939–1940 | Succeeded by Post redesignated 1st London Division |
| New title New post | GOC 56th (London) Infantry Division; 1940–1941 | Succeeded by Montagu Stopford |
| New title New post | Commandant-General of the RAF Regiment; 1942–1945 | Succeeded by Alfred Robinson |
