= Ronald Barnes, 3rd Baron Gorell =

British politician and writer (1884-1963)

Captain The Right Honourable The Lord Gorell CBE MC
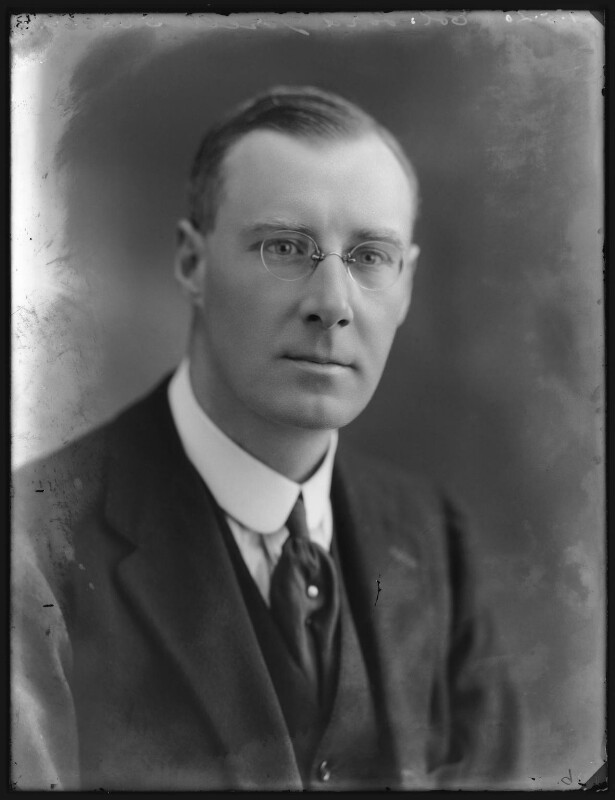
- Gorell in 1920

Under-Secretary of State for Air
- In office 1921–1922
- Preceded by: The Marquess of Londonderry
- Succeeded by: The Duke of Sutherland

Member of the House of Lords
- Lord Temporal
- In office 16 January 1917 – 2 May 1963
- Preceded by: The 2nd Baron Gorell
- Succeeded by: The 4th Baron Gorell

Personal details
- Born: Ronald Gorell Barnes; 16 April 1884 London, England
- Died: 2 May 1963 (aged 79) Arundel, West Sussex
- Party: Liberal
- Education: Balliol College, Oxford
- Civilian awards: Commander of the Order of the British Empire; Officer of the Order of the British Empire

Military service
- Allegiance: United Kingdom
- Branch/service: British Army
- Years of service: 1915–1918
- Rank: Captain
- Unit: Rifle Brigade
- Battles/wars: First World War
- Military awards: Military Cross

Ronald Gorell Barnes, 3rd Baron Gorell (16 April 1884 – 2 May 1963), was a British hereditary peer, Liberal politician, poet, author and newspaper editor.

== Early life and education ==
Gorell was the second son of Gorell Barnes, 1st Baron Gorell, President of the Probate Divorce and Admiralty Division of the High Court of Justice.

Gorell was educated at Winchester College, Harrow School and Balliol College, Oxford. While at Oxford, he played first-class cricket for the University cricket team. After leaving Oxford, Gorell played with Marylebone Cricket Club (MCC) for 13 seasons, averaging 431 runs and 43 wickets in his 19-match career. In 1909, he was admitted to the Inner Temple, to practice as a barrister. Gorell worked as a journalist for The Times from 1911 to 1915.

== Military and career ==
During World War I he served in the Rifle Brigade, where he reached the rank of captain, was mentioned in despatches and, in 1917, received the Military Cross.

Barnes succeeded as third Baron Gorell on 16 January 1917 after his unmarried elder brother was killed in the War. After the war, he took his seat on the Liberal benches in the House of Lords and in July 1921 he was appointed Under-Secretary of State for Air in the coalition government of David Lloyd George, an office he held until the government fell in October 1922. He was the founder of the (Royal) Army Education Corps in which he enabled the army "to take an immense step forward; the biggest it has ever taken" (Field Marshal Sir Henry Wilson, Chief of the Imperial General Staff). Barnes' autobiography is One Man... Many Parts.

After the war, he spent two years working at the War Office as Deputy Director of Staff Duties (Education), and then served a year as Under-Secretary of State for Air from 1921 to 1922. In 1925, he left the Liberals and joined the Labour Party.

In October 1930 he was nominated by the Labour government of Ramsay MacDonald to succeed Lord Irwin as Viceroy of India, but King George V and the Conservatives opposed this move, and Lord Willingdon was appointed instead.

He then devoted his life to literature, editing the Cornhill Magazine, while still serving on many public and private committees.

== Charitable work ==
Gorell was involved with many charities, particularly those that were educational or literary in nature. He was chairman of the Teachers' Registration Council (1922–1935), King's College Hospital (1929–1933), and of Dulwich College and Alleyn's School (1949–1959), and president of the National Council for the Unmarried Mother and her Child (1928–1962), the Royal Society of Teachers (1929–1935), and of the Royal Literary Fund (1951–1962).

== Personal life and honours ==
Gorell was invested as an Officer of the Order of the British Empire in the 1918 Birthday Honours and as a Commander of the same order in 1919. He was also invested as an Officier of the Order of Leopold in 1919.

He was later editor of the Cornhill Magazine from 1933 to 1939. He was co-president of the Detection Club with Agatha Christie from 1956 to 1963.

Lord Gorell married Maud Elizabeth Furse Radcliffe (1886–1954), eldest daughter of Alexander Nelson Radcliffe and Isabel Grace Henderson, in 1922. He died at his home in Arundel, aged 79, and was succeeded in the barony by his eldest son, Timothy.

Coat of arms of Ronald Barnes, 3rd Baron Gorell
Crest In front of a cubit arm in armour, the hand grasping a broken sword all Proper the wrist encircled by a wreath of oak Or, five annulets interlaced and fessways Argent. Escutcheon Azure two lions passant guardant Ermine each holding in the dexter paw a sprig of oak slipped Or between three annulets in pale Argent. Supporters On either side a ram Proper charged on the shoulder with two annulets interlaced Azure. Motto Frangas Non Flectes (You May Break, You Shall Not Bend Me)

== Bibliography ==
Gorell wrote 14 works of fiction, mainly detective stories, and several collections of poetry, published by John Murray.

- In the Night (1917)
- DEQ (1922)
- Venturers All (1927)
- The Devouring Fire (1928)
- He Who Fights (1928)
- Devil's Drum (1929)
- Red Lilac (1935)
- Wild Thyme and other stories (1941)
- Murder at Mavering (1943)
- Luck and other new stories (1948)
- Let Not Thy Left Hand (1949)
- Earl's End (1951)
- Where There's a Head (1952)
- Murder at Manor House (1954)

== See also ==
- Baron Gorell

Political offices
Preceded by The Marquess of Londonderry	Under-Secretary of State for Air; 1921–1922	Succeeded by The Duke of Sutherland
Peerage of the United Kingdom
Preceded by Henry Barnes	Baron Gorell; 1917–1963; Member of the House of Lords (1917–1963)	Succeeded by Timothy Barnes
