= Gowrelli =

Gowrelly
- Village
- Location in Telangana, India
- Coordinates: 17.369972°N 78.676778°E
- Country: India
- State: Telangana
- District: RangaReddy
- Talukas: Hayathnagar

Population (2001)
  - Total: 3,000

Languages
  - Official: Telugu
- Time zone: UTC+5:30 (IST)
- Telephone code: 040
- Vehicle registration: AP 26 X XXXX

Gowrelly is a gram panchayat and village in Hayanth Nagar mandal in Ranga Reddy district in the state of Telangana in India. It is one of the rapidly growing villages in Ranga Reddy District.It is close to the Outer Ring Road, Hyderabad.

== Transportation ==
Transportation is available to Gowrelly from various places in Hyderabad and Secunderabad. APSRTC runs buses from Koti, Dilsukhnagar to Gowrelly. The roads have been well laid and the infrastructure well developed for transportation. The APSRTC bus route numbers are as follows:

1. 201G [Koti to Gowrelly via Dilsukhnagar/Kothapet/Nagole]

Gowrelly is located in drive able distance from the city. Its 25 min away from Dilsukhnagar and 20 min away from Nagole.
