= Henry Barnes, 2nd Baron Gorell =

British Army officer

Major The Right Honourable The Lord Gorell DSO
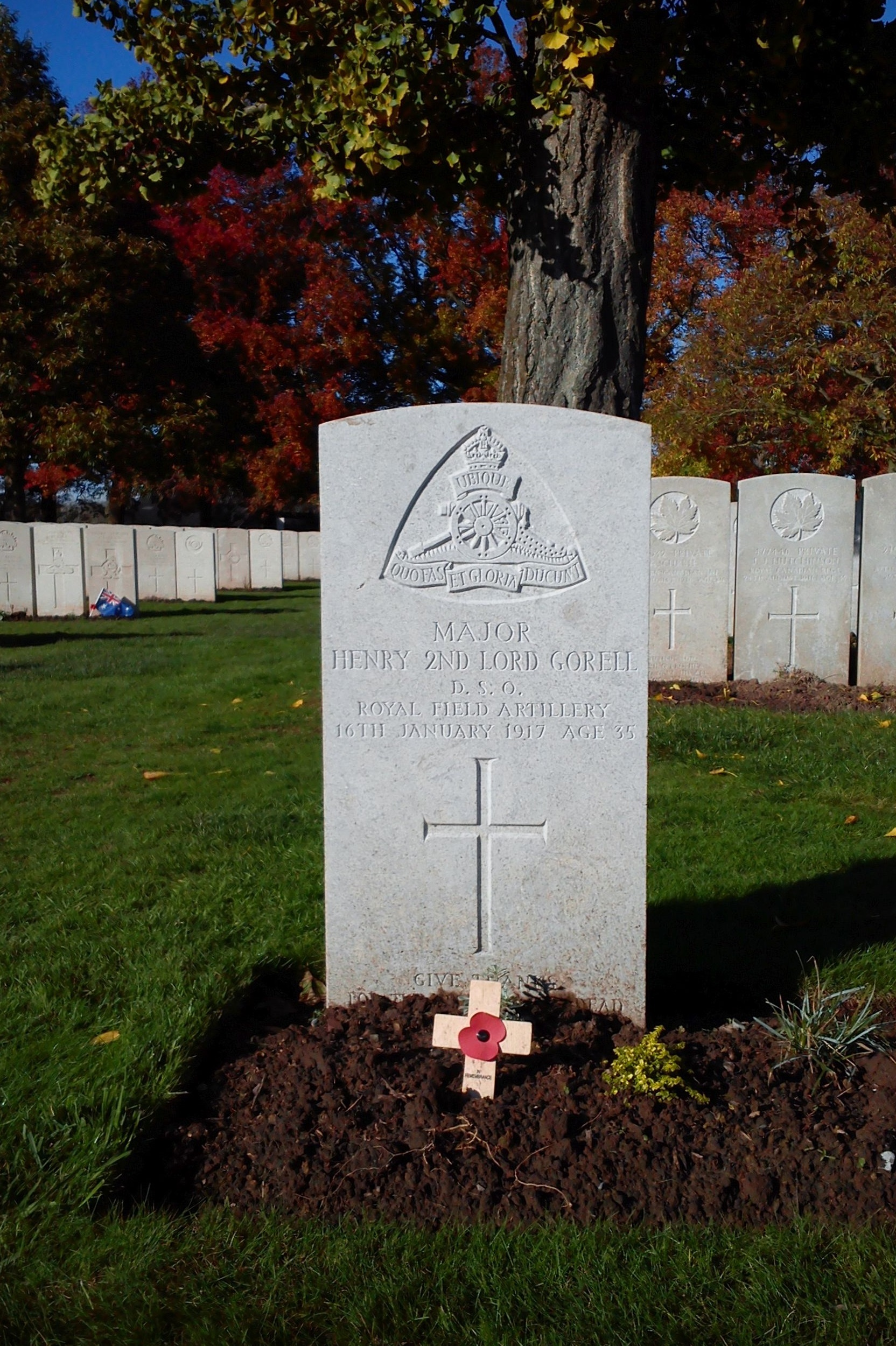
- The grave of Henry Barnes, 2nd Baron Gorell (1882–1917), at Lijssenthoek Military Cemetery, near Ypres, Belgium

Member of the House of Lords
- Lord Temporal
- In office 22 April 1913 – 16 January 1917
- Preceded by: The 1st Baron Gorell
- Succeeded by: The 3rd Baron Gorell

Personal details
- Born: Henry Gorell Barnes; 21 January 1882
- Died: 16 January 1917 (aged 34)

Major Henry Gorell Barnes, 2nd Baron Gorell (21 January 1882 – 16 January 1917), was a barrister and an officer in the Territorial Force. He served on the Western Front in World War I where he was mortally wounded.

== Education and legal career ==
He was born in 1882, the eldest son of Gorell Barnes, 1st Baron Gorell. After an education at Winchester, Trinity College, Oxford (MA 1908), and Harvard, he was called to the bar by the Inner Temple in 1906. He worked as a secretary to his father when he was on the Bench, and later as secretary of the Royal Commission on Divorce. He succeeded his father in the peerage in 1913. He was a very active English Freemason, and a member of Oxford's Apollo University Lodge.

== Military career and death ==
Gorell was a pre-war officer in the part-time Territorial Force, having been commissioned as a second lieutenant in the 18th County of London Battery, 7th County of London Brigade, Royal Field Artillery, on 2 September 1909. He was promoted to captain on 19 April 1912, and on the outbreak of World War I he was acting commander of 19th County of London Battery detached at Shepherd's Bush. He went with his battery to the Western Front where he commanded it as a Temporary major. When the infantry of 47th (1/2nd London) Division succeeded in capturing High Wood on the Somme after bitter fighting on 15 September 1916, the first gun battery to come up in support across the deeply-cratered ground was Gorell's. He later made a dangerous reconnaissance of the whole divisional front. For these actions he was awarded the Distinguished Service Order.

On 15 January 1917, while serving in the Ypres Salient, Gorell was returning from observing for his battery in the front line when he was mortally wounded by an enemy shell in a communication trench. "A pre-war Territorial officer of high professional attainments, and at times almost reckless courage, his loss was universally mourned". He died the next day, having served one year and ten month's continuous service abroad. He is buried at Lijssenthoek Military Cemetery near Poperinge, West Flanders, Belgium.

The 2nd Baron Gorell was succeeded in the peerage by his younger brother Ronald.

Coat of arms of Henry Barnes, 2nd Baron Gorell
Crest In front of a cubit arm in armour, the hand grasping a broken sword all Proper the wrist encircled by a wreath of oak Or, five annulets interlaced and fessways Argent. Escutcheon Azure two lions passant guardant Ermine each holding in the dexter paw a sprig of oak slipped Or between three annulets in pale Argent. Supporters On either side a ram Proper charged on the shoulder with two annulets interlaced Azure. Motto Frangas Non Flectes (You May Break, You Shall Not Bend Me)

== See also ==
- Baron Gorell

== Notes ==
Peerage of the United Kingdom
Preceded by Gorell Barnes	Baron Gorell; 1913–1917; Member of the House of Lords (1913–1917)	Succeeded by Ronald Barnes
