= 25th Armoured Engineer Brigade Royal Engineers =

The 'B' Assault Brigade RAC/RE. was founded on 5 January 1945, in Italy. The Brigade Headquarters was formed from redesignating the 25th Army Tank Brigade's headquarters to the 25th Armoured Assault Brigade Royal Engineers. Three months later, on 6 April, the formation was redesignated as the 25th Armoured Engineer Brigade Royal Engineers. The brigade served in Italy until the end of the war.

== See also ==
- British Armoured formations of World War II
- List of British brigades of the Second World War

== Bibliography ==
- Joslen, H. F. (2003) [1960]. Orders of Battle: Second World War, 1939–1945. Uckfield, East Sussex: Naval and Military Press. ISBN 978-1-84342-474-1.
