= Timothy Barnes, 4th Baron Gorell =

The Right Honourable The Lord Gorell

Member of the House of Lords
- Lord Temporal
- In office 2 May 1963 – 11 November 1999 as a hereditary peer
- Preceded by: The 3rd Baron Gorell
- Succeeded by: Seat abolished (Note: Pursuant to the House of Lords Act 1999.)

Personal details
- Born: Timothy John Radcliffe Barnes; 2 August 1927
- Died: 25 September 2007 (aged 80)
- Political party: Crossbencher

Timothy John Radcliffe Barnes, 4th Baron Gorell (2 August 1927 – 25 September 2007), was a British businessman and hereditary peer.

He succeeded in the barony upon the death of his father, Ronald Barnes, 3rd Baron Gorell, in 1963.

He married Joan Marion Collins in 1954 and had two adopted daughters. Since there was no male issue from this marriage, Lord Gorell was succeeded by his nephew, John Barnes, only son of his younger brother, the Hon. Ronald Alexander Henry Barnes (1931–2003).

== Arms ==
Coat of arms of Timothy Barnes, 4th Baron Gorell
Crest In front of a cubit arm in armour, the hand grasping a broken sword all Proper the wrist encircled by a wreath of oak Or, five annulets interlaced and fessways Argent. Escutcheon Azure two lions passant guardant Ermine each holding in the dexter paw a sprig of oak slipped Or between three annulets in pale Argent. Supporters On either side a ram Proper charged on the shoulder with two annulets interlaced Azure. Motto Frangas Non Flectes (You May Break, You Shall Not Bend Me)

== See also ==
- Baron Gorell

== Notes ==
Peerage of the United Kingdom
Preceded by Ronald Barnes	Baron Gorell; 1963–2007; Member of the House of Lords (1963–1999)	Succeeded by John Barnes
