= John Barnes, 5th Baron Gorell =

English aristocrat

John Picton Gorell Barnes, 5th Baron Gorell (born 29 July 1959), is a British Chartered Surveyor. In 1989 he married Rosanne Duncan, with whom he has two children. He was educated at King's School, Bruton, in Somerset and at the Cornwall Technical College in Camborne, Cornwall. Barnes is a liveryman of the Worshipful Company of Weavers and is also a Freeman of the City of London. He lives in Northamptonshire.

He succeeded in the barony upon the death of his uncle, Timothy Barnes, 4th Baron Gorell, in 2007.

Coat of arms of John Barnes, 5th Baron Gorell
Crest In front of a cubit arm in armour, the hand grasping a broken sword all Proper the wrist encircled by a wreath of oak Or, five annulets interlaced and fessways Argent. Escutcheon Azure two lions passant guardant Ermine each holding in the dexter paw a sprig of oak slipped Or between three annulets in pale Argent. Supporters On either side a ram Proper charged on the shoulder with two annulets interlaced Azure. Motto Frangas Non Flectes (You May Break, You Shall Not Bend Me)

== See also ==
- Baron Gorell

Peerage of the United Kingdom
Preceded by Timothy Barnes	Baron Gorell; 2007–present	Incumbent; Heir apparent: Hon. Oliver Barnes
