= Under-Secretary of State for Air =

The Under-Secretary of State for Air was a junior ministerial post in the United Kingdom Government, supporting the Secretary of State for Air in his role of managing the Royal Air Force. It was established on 10 January 1919, replacing the previous short-lived posts of Parliamentary Secretary to the Air Board and Parliamentary Secretary to the Air Council.

== Parliamentary Secretary to the Air Board, 1916–1917 ==
Name	Entered office	Left office
John Baird	1916	1917

== Parliamentary Secretary to the Air Council, 1917–1919 ==
Name	Entered office	Left office
John Baird	1917	1919

== Under-Secretary of State for Air, 1919–1964 ==
Name	Entered office	Left office
J. E. B. Seely	1919	1919
George Tryon	1919	1920
Charles Vane-Tempest-Stewart, 7th Marquess of Londonderry	1920	1921
Ronald Barnes, 3rd Baron Gorell	1921	1922
George Sutherland-Leveson-Gower, 5th Duke of Sutherland	1922	1924
William Leach	1924	1924
Sir Philip Sassoon, 3rd Baronet	1924	1929
Frederick Montague	1929	1931
Sir Philip Sassoon	1931	1937
Anthony Muirhead	1937	1938
Harold Balfour	1938	1941
Harold Balfour and Hugh Seely, 1st Baron Sherwood	20 July 1941	21 November 1944
Hugh Seely, 1st Baron Sherwood and Rupert Brabner	21 November 1944	27 March 1945
Lord Sherwood	27 March	12 April 1945
Lord Sherwood and Quintin Hogg	12 April 1945	23 May 1945
Quintin Hogg and David Beatty, 2nd Earl Beatty	26 May 1945	4 August 1945
John Strachey	1945	1946
Geoffrey de Freitas	1946	1950
Aidan Crawley	1950	1951
Nigel Birch	1951	1952
George Ward	1952	1955
Christopher Soames	1955	1957
Ian Orr-Ewing	1957	1959
Airey Neave	1959	1959
William Taylor	1959	1962
Julian Ridsdale	1962	1964

== Minister of State for the Air Force, 1964–1967 ==
Name	Entered office	Left office
Hugh Fraser	1964	1964
Edward Shackleton, Baron Shackleton	1964	7 January 1967

== Under-Secretary of State for the Air Force, 1964–1981 ==
Name	Entered office	Left office
Julian Ridsdale	1964	1964
Bruce Millan	1964	1966
Merlyn-Rees	1966	1968
Ian Winterbottom, Baron Winterbottom	1968	24 June 1970
Antony Lambton	24 June 1970	5 June 1973
Anthony Kershaw	5 June 1973	8 January 1974
Euan Howard, 4th Baron Strathcona and Mount Royal	8 January 1974	8 March 1974
Brynmor John	8 March 1974	14 April 1976
James Wellbeloved	14 April 1976	6 May 1979
Geoffrey Pattie	6 May 1979	29 May 1981

== Sources ==
- D. Butler and G. Butler, Twentieth Century British Political Facts 1900–2000
