= Gorrell Run =

River in the United States of America

Coordinates: 39°29′39″N 80°56′14″W

Gorrell Run is a stream in the U.S. state of West Virginia.

Gorrell Run was named in honor of a local pioneer.

== See also ==
- List of rivers of West Virginia
