= Gorell Barnes, 1st Baron Gorell =

British lawyer and judge

The Right Honourable The Lord Gorell PC
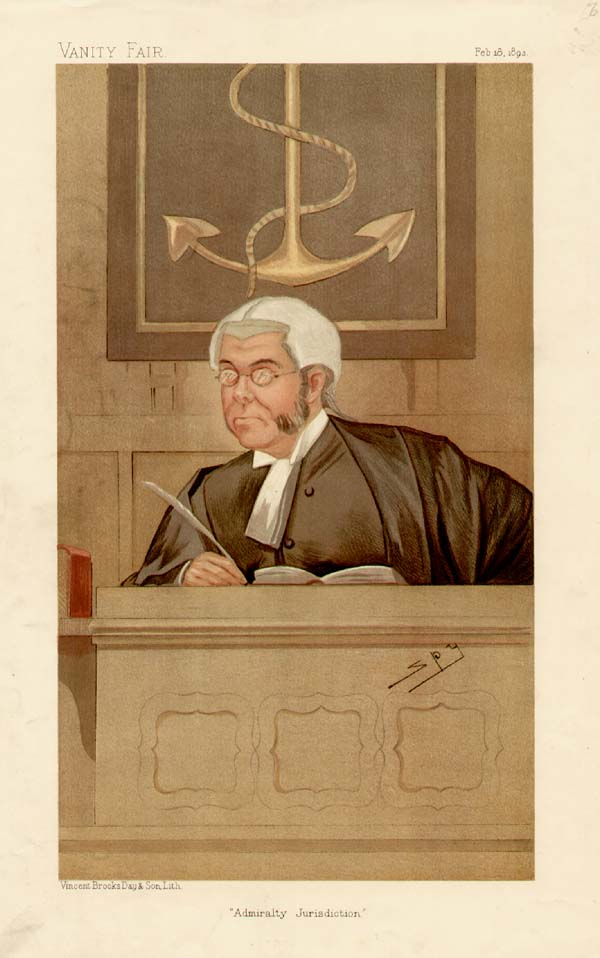
- "Admiralty Jurisdiction"; Barnes as caricatured by Spy (Leslie Ward) in Vanity Fair, February 1893

President of the Probate, Divorce and Admiralty Division
- In office 30 January 1905 – 10 February 1909
- Preceded by: Sir Francis Jeune
- Succeeded by: Sir John Bigham

Personal details
- Born: 16 May 1848
- Died: 22 April 1913 (aged 64)
- Spouse: Mary Barnes nee Mitchell
- Children: Henry Gorell Barnes
- Education: Peterhouse, Cambridge

John Gorell Barnes, 1st Baron Gorell PC (16 May 1848 – 22 April 1913), was a British lawyer and judge.

== Biography ==
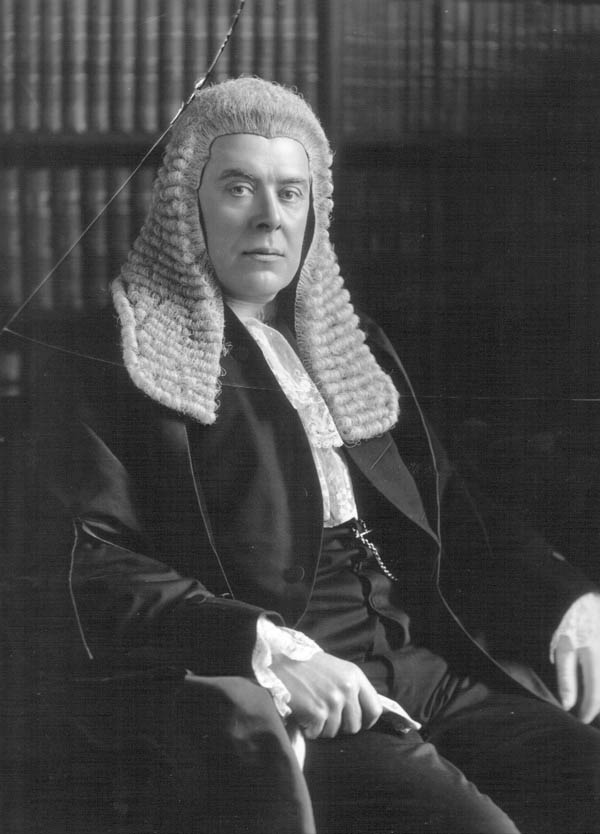
John Gorell Barnes, 1st Baron Gorell (1848-1913), 18 March 1905

Gorell was the eldest son of Henry Barnes, a shipowner of Liverpool, and was educated at Peterhouse, Cambridge. where he took his degree in 1868. He began work as a solicitor, but was called to the Bar in 1876 and became a Queen's Counsel in 1888.

He was well known as an expert in Admiralty cases, and in 1892 was made a Judge of the Probate, Divorce and Admiralty Division of the High Court of Justice, where he acted as president during the illness of Sir Francis Jeune in late 1902. When Jeune retired in 1905, Gorell was appointed president of the division from 1905 until 1909. He was admitted to the Privy Council in 1905 and in 1909 he was raised to the peerage as Baron Gorell, of Brampton in the County of Derby. He died in April 1913, aged 64, and was succeeded in the barony by his eldest son Henry Gorell Barnes.

== Family ==
Lord Gorell married Mary, daughter of Thomas Mitchell, in 1881.

== Arms ==
Coat of arms of Gorell Barnes, 1st Baron Gorell
Crest In front of a cubit arm in armour, the hand grasping a broken sword all Proper the wrist encircled by a wreath of oak Or, five annulets interlaced and fessways Argent. Escutcheon Azure two lions passant guardant Ermine each holding in the dexter paw a sprig of oak slipped Or between three annulets in pale Argent. Supporters On either side a ram Proper charged on the shoulder with two annulets interlaced Azure. Motto Frangas Non Flectes (You May Break, You Shall Not Bend Me)

== Notes ==
Peerage of the United Kingdom
New creation	Baron Gorell; 1909–1913	Succeeded by Henry Gorell Barnes
