= List of people with given name Dan =

Name list

Dan
- Gender: Masculine
- Language: English, Hebrew, Hungarian, Romanian, Chinese, Japanese, Korean

Origin
- Meaning: English: "valley"; Hebrew: "to judge"; Japanese (檀): Euonymus hamiltonianus

Other names
- Variant forms: English: Surname: Dann, Dane; Given name: Daniel, Danny; Chinese, Korean: Tan

This is a list of notable people with the given name Dan:

== A ==
- Dan Abbott (1862–1930), American baseball player
- Dan Abdul-latif (born 1970), Ghanaian politician
- Dan Abnett (born 1965), British comic book writer and novelist
- Dan Kwasi Abodakpi (born 1950), Ghanaian politician
- Dan Abraham (born 1970), American filmmaker
- Dan Abramovich (born 1963), Israeli-American mathematician
- Dan Abramovici, Canadian actor, writer, and director
- Dan Abrams (born 1966), American entrepreneur, television host, and lawyer
- Dan Aceda (born 1984), Kenyan musician
- Dan Ackerman (born 1974), American videogame journalist
- Dan Adamescu (1948–2017), Romanian businessman
- Dan Adams (1887-1964), American baseball player
- Dan Adams (American football) (born 1984), American football player
- Dan Added (born 1999), French tennis player
- Dan Adkins (1937–2013), American illustrator
- Dan Agyei (born 1997), Ghanaian footballer
- Dan Ahdoot (born 1978), American actor, writer, and comedian
- Dan Ahearn (1888–1942), Irish-American triple jumper
- Dan Ahern (1898–1963), American football player
- Dan Ahlers (born 1973), American businessman and politician
- Dan Børge Akerø (born 1951), Norwegian television personality
- Dan Akin (born 1998), British basketball player
- Dan Albas (born 1976), Canadian politician
- Dan Albone (1860–1906), English inventor
- Dan Andrei Aldea (1950–2020), Romanian musical artist
- Dan Alderson (1941–1989), American scientist
- Dan Aldridge (born 1984), British politician
- Dan Alexa (born 1979), Romanian footballer and manager
- Dan Alexander (offensive lineman) (born 1955), American football player
- Dan Alexander (fullback) (born 1978), American football player
- Dan Dale Alexander (1919–1990), American pseudoscientific diet advocate
- Dan Allen (gambler) (1832–1884), American gambler
- Dan Allen (American football) (1955–2004), American football player and coach
- Dan Allender (born 1952), Christian therapist
- Dan Allon (born 1982), Israeli interdisciplinary artist
- Dan Allsopp (1871–1921), English footballer
- Dan Almagor (born 1935), Israeli playwright
- Dan Alon (1945–2018), Israeli fencer
- Dan Altavilla (born 1992), American baseball player
- Dan Amboyer (born 1985), American actor
- Dan Amiram (born 1977), Israeli professor of business
- Dan Ammann (born 1972), New Zealand executive
- Dan Amos (born 1951), American business executive
- Dan Amrich (born 1971), American journalist
- Dan Amstutz (1932–2006), American government official and business executive
- Dan Amuke (born 1949), Kenyan sprinter
- Dan Anca (1947–2005), Romanian former footballer
- Dan Andelman (born 1975), American television personality
- Dan Anderson (basketball, born 1951) (born 1951), American basketball player
- Dan Anderson (psychologist) (1921–2003), American psychologist
- Dan Anderson (basketball, born 1943), American basketball player
- Dan Andersson (1888–1920), Swedish author and poet
- Dan Andriano (born 1977), American musician
- Dan Angel, American film producer
- Dan Angel (politician) (born 1939), American politician
- Dan Anghelescu (born 1958), Romanian football player
- Dan Anstey (born 1984), Australian presenter
- Dan Anthony, American songwriter
- Dan Antolik, American football coach
- Dan Antonioli (born 1960), American businessman
- Dan Antoniuk (born 1981), American soccer player
- Dan Antopolski (born 1972), British comic, actor and writer
- Dan Apostol (1957–2013), Romanian writer and researcher
- Dan Applegate (1917–1999), American aerospace engineer
- Dan Arbeid (1928–2010), English studio potter
- Dan Archdeacon (1954–2015), American mathematician
- Dan Archer (born 1944), American football player
- Michael Dan Archer (born 1955), British sculptor
- Dan Archibong (1943–1990), Nigerian soldier
- Dan Ardell (born 1941), American baseball player
- Dan Ariely (born 1967), Israeli-American professor of psychology and behavioral economics
- Dan Armon (born 1948), Israeli poet
- Dan Armstrong (1934–2004), American guitarist, luthier, and session musician
- Arnór Dan Arnarson (born 1985), Icelandic musician
- Dan Arnold (American football) (born 1995), American football player and coach
- Dan Arvizu, American engineer
- Dan Ashbaugh, American para-alpine skier
- Dan Ashbel (born 1949), Israeli ambassador
- Dan Ashkenazi, 13th-century German Talmudist
- Dan Ashley (born 1963), American journalist
- Dan Ashton (born 1954), Canadian politician
- Dan Ashworth (born 1971), English football director
- Dan Atanasiu (born 1955), Romanian pianist
- Dan Atar (born 1959), German-born cardiologist
- Dan Atherton (born 1982), British racing cyclist
- Dan Atkinson (born 1961), British journalist and author
- Dan Attias (born 1951), American television director and producer
- Dan Attoe (born 1975), American painter
- Dan Audick (born 1954), American football player
- Dan Auerbach (born 1979), American singer-songwriter and producer
- Dan Austin, English record producer
- Dan the Automator (born 1966), American record producer
- Dan Avey (1941–2010), American radio personality
- Dan Avidan (born 1979), American musician and YouTuber
- Dan Ayala (1937–2018), American basketball coach
- Dan Aykroyd (born 1952), Canadian and American actor and musician
- Dan Ayrault (1935–1990), American rower
- Dan Azeez (born 1989), British boxer

== B ==
- Dan Babos (born 2000), Welsh rugby union player
- Dan Backs (born 1953), Canadian politician
- Dan Baer (born 1977), American politician and former diplomat
- Dan Bahadur Kurmi, Nepali politician
- Dan Bahat, Israeli archaeologist
- Dan Bain (1874–1962), Canadian amateur ice hockey player
- Dan Baird (born 1953), American musician
- Dan Bakkedahl (born 1969), American actor and comedian
- Dan Balan (born 1979), Moldovan singer
- Dan Balauru (born 1980), Romanian footballer
- Dan Baleinadogo (born 1978), Fijian rugby union player
- Dan Ballard (footballer) (born 1999), Northern Irish footballer
- Dan Balz, American journalist
- Dan Banik, Norwegian political scientist
- Dan Bankhead (1920–1976), American baseball player
- Dan Barag (1935–2009), Israeli archaeologist
- Dan Baranik (born 1962), American football coach
- Dan Barna (born 1975), Romanian politician
- Dan Barnhart (1912–1965), American football player
- Dan Barouch (born 1973), American physician, immunologist and virologist
- Dan Barreiro (born 1955), American sportswriter
- Dan Barrow (1909–1993), American rower
- Dan Bárta (born 1969), Czech singer
- Dan Bartel, American politician
- Dan Barton (1921–2009), American actor
- Dan Basambombo (born 1997), Canadian gridiron football player
- Dan Basen (1939–1970), American sculptor and painter
- Dan Batty (born 1997), English footballer
- Dan Baugh (born 1974), Canadian rugby union player
- Dan Baum (1956–2020), American journalist and writer
- Dan Bayles, American artist
- Dan Bazuin (born 1983), American football player
- Dan Beach Bradley (1804–1873), American Protestant missionary to Siam
- Dan Beachy-Quick, American poet
- Dan Beauvais (1920–1998), Australian rules footballer
- Dan Beckerman, American sports executive
- Dan Beddoe (1863–1937), British opera singer
- Dan Beebe (born 1957), American sports administrator
- Dan Beery (born 1975), American rower
- Dan Beirne (born 1982), Canadian actor
- Dan Bejar (born 1972), Canadian musician
- Dan Bellino (born 1978), American baseball umpire
- Dan Bellomy, American organist
- Dan Ben-Amos (1934–2023), Israeli-American folklorist
- Dan Ben-Amotz (1924–1989), Israeli writer, journalist, screenwriter, and actor
- Dan Bendon (born 1989), English cricketer
- Dan Benish (born 1961), American football player
- Dan Benishek (1952–2021), American politician
- Dan Jacobo Beninson (1931–2003), Argentine physicist
- Dan Benjamin (born 1972), American computer programmer
- Dan Bent (born 1996), Gibraltarian footballer
- Dan Berendsen, American producer and screenwriter
- Dan Berger (American academic) (born 1981), American historian
- Dan Bergeron, American politician
- Dan Berglund (born 1963), Swedish musician
- Dan Berindei (1923–2021), Romanian historian
- Dan Berkovitz, American politician
- Dan Bern (born 1965), American singer-songwriter
- Dan Bernhardt (born 1958), American-Canadian economist
- Dan Bertoia (born 1969), Canadian middle-distance runner
- Dan Bertolini (born 1985), American college baseball coach
- Dan Beutler (born 1977), Swedish handballer
- Dan Bewley (born 1999), British speedway rider
- Dan Beyer (born 1977), American radio presenter
- Dan Singh Bhandari, Indian politician
- Dan Bibby (born 1991), English rugby union player
- Dan Bickham (1864–1951), American baseball player
- Dan Bickley (born 1963), American sports radio talk show host and on-line sports columnist
- Dan Bidois (born 1983), New Zealand politician
- Dan Biederman, American urban redevelopment expert and public space management consultant
- Dan Biggar (born 1989), Welsh rugby union player
- Dan Biggers (1931–2011), American actor
- Dan Biggin (born 1980), English musician
- Dan Bigras (born 1957), Canadian singer
- Dan Bilefsky, Canadian newspaper journalist
- Dan Billany (1913–1943), English novelist
- Dan Bilzerian (born 1980), American Internet personality and gambler
- Dan Biocchi (born 1955), Canadian athlete and politician
- Dan Birch (born 1981), English cricketer
- Dan Birdwell (1940–1978), American football player
- Dan Birikwalira (born 1996), Ugandan footballer
- Dan Birkey (born 1957), American soccer player and coach
- Dan Birmingham, American boxing trainer
- Dan Singh Bisht, Indian philanthropist
- Dan Biton, Israeli general
- Dan Biton (footballer) (born 1995), Israeli footballer
- Dan Bittman (born 1962), Romanian singer
- Dan Bjornlie (born 1977), American ice hockey player
- Dan A. Black, American economist and professor
- Dan Black (born 1975), British singer-songwriter
- Dan Black (baseball) (born 1987), American baseball player
- Dan Blackburn (born 1983), Canadian ice hockey player
- Dan Blaine, American football player
- Dan Gregory Blair, American nonprofit executive
- Dan Blazer (born 1944), American psychiatrist
- Dan Bleckinger (born 1947), American tennis player
- Dan Block, American jazz clarinetist
- Dan Blocker (1928–1972), American actor
- Dan Blue (born 1949), American politician
- Dan Blum, American author
- Dan Blumberg, Israeli geographer
- Dan Bobish (born 1970), American martial artist
- Dan Boddicker (born 1962), American politician
- Dan Boeckner (born 1978), Canadian musician
- Dan Boisture (1925–2007), American football player
- Dan Boitano (born 1953), American baseball player
- Dan Bolduc (born 1953), American ice hockey player
- Dan Bonar (born 1956), Canadian ice hockey player
- Dan Boneh, Israeli-American professor
- Dan Bongino (born 1974), American political commentator
- Dan Bonner (born 1953), American sports commentator
- Dan Book (born 1983), American producer and singer
- Dan Bordeianu (born 1975), Romanian actor and singer
- Dan Boren (born 1973), American politician
- Dan Borgmeyer, American businessman and mayor
- Dan Borislow (1961–2014), American entrepreneur, sports team owner, inventor and thoroughbred horse breeder
- Dan Botta (1907–1958), Romanian poet and essayist
- Dan Botwe (born 1958), Ghanaian politician
- Dan Bouchard (born 1950), Canadian ice hockey player
- Dan Bourbonnais (born 1962), Canadian ice hockey player
- Dan Bourchier, Australian journalist and television presenter
- Dan Bourke (born 2004), Irish hurler
- Dan Bowling (born 1946), American politician
- Dan Bradbury (born 1999), English professional golfer
- Dan Bradley, American stunt coordinator
- Dan Bradley (geneticist), Northern Irish geneticist
- Dan Beach Bradley (1804–1873), American Protestant missionary to Siam
- Dan Brady (Ohio politician), American politician
- Dan Brady (Illinois politician) (born 1961), American politician
- Dan Brady (ice hockey) (born 1950), American ice hockey player
- Dan Bramall (athlete) (born 1985), British athlete
- Dan Bramall (footballer) (born 1998), English footballer
- Dan Bramble (born 1990), English long jumper
- Dan Branch (born 1958), American politician
- Dan Brandenburg (born 1973), American football player
- Dan Braun (born c. 1962), American musician
- Dan Ar Braz (born 1949), Breton folk guitarist
- Dan Bremnes (born 1983), Canadian Christian musician, guitarist and drummer
- Dan Brennan (born 1962), Canadian ice hockey player
- Dan Brenner (born 1963), American songwriter
- Dan Brereton (born 1965), American writer and illustrator
- Dan Breznitz, American-Canadian academic
- Dan Bricklin (born 1951), American businessman and engineer
- Dan Briggs (musician) (born 1985), American bassist
- Dan Briggs (baseball) (born 1952), American baseball player
- Dan Brimsvík (born 1987), Faroese football manager
- Dan Briody (born 1971), American political writer
- Dan Britt (born 1950), American astrogeologist
- Dan Broadbent (born 1985), English cricketer
- Dan Broadhead (1891–1978), Scottish footballer
- Dan W. Brock (1937–2020), American philosopher
- Dan Brodbeck, Canadian record producer
- Dan Brode (born 1985), American racing driver
- Dan Brodie, Australian singer-songwriter
- Dan Brodsky-Chenfeld, American skydiver
- Dan Bronchinson, French actor and producer
- Dan Bronoske (born 1980), American firefighter and politician
- Dan Broström (1870–1925), Swedish politician
- Dan Brouillette (born 1962), American government official, lobbyist and businessman
- Dan Brouthers (1858–1932), American baseball player
- Dan Browne (born 1974), American long-distance runner
- Dan Bryan (1900–1985), WWII Irish Army officer
- Dan Bryant (mountaineer) (1905–1957), New Zealand climber of Mount Everest
- Dan Bryer (born 1989), English musical artist
- Dan Bryk (born 1970), Canadian musician
- Dan Brzokoupil (born 1947), Swedish footballer
- Dan Bucatinsky (born 1965), American actor, writer and producer
- Dan Buckingham (born 1980), New Zealand wheelchair rugby player
- Dan Buckley, American entertainment
- Dan Buckner (born 1990), American gridiron football player
- Dan Bucșa (born 1988), Romanian footballer
- Dan S. Budd (1927–2015), American politician
- Dan Budnik (1933–2020), American photographer
- Dan Buenning (born 1981), American football player
- Dan Buettner (born 1960), American explorer, author, storyteller, longevity researcher and public speaker
- Dan Bull (born 1986), British rapper
- Dan Bull (politician), Australian politician
- Dan Bullock (1953–1969), United States Marine
- Dan Bunz (born 1955), American football player
- Dan Burghelea (born 1943), Romanian-American mathematician
- Dan Burincă (born 1972), Romanian artistic gymnast
- Dan L. Burk, American academic
- Dan Burke (baseball) (1868–1933), American baseball player
- Dan Burke (basketball) (born 1959), American basketball player-coach
- Dan Burley (1907–1962), American pianist and journalist
- Dan Burlin (born 1980), Swedish footballer
- Dan Burn (born 1992), English footballer
- Dan Burr (born 1951), American comic book
- Dan Burros (1937–1965), American Jewish neo-Nazi
- Dan Burt (born 1970), American college basketball coach
- Dan Burton (born 1938), American politician
- Dan Burton (actor) (born 1985), British actor
- Dan Busby (1941–2022), American accountant
- Dan Bush, American film director and screenwriter
- Dan Byles (born 1974), British politician and adventurer
- Dan Bylsma (born 1970), American ice hockey player and coach
- Dan Byrd (born 1985), American actor

== C ==
- Dan Caddy (born 1973), Australian politician
- Dan Caldwell (defense official), American political advisor
- Dan Caldwell, Mexican entrepreneur and television presenter
- Dan Calichman (born 1968), American soccer player
- Dan Califano, American soccer player
- Dan Callahan (born 1938), American football player
- Dan Callandrillo (born 1959), Italian-American basketball player
- Dan Callikan (1947–2023), Mauritian politician
- Dan Cammish (born 1989), British racing driver
- Dan Canniffe (1909–1978), Irish hurler
- Dan Canter (1961–2020), American soccer player
- Dan Cantor, American socialist political organizer
- Dan Cantore (born 1946), American weightlifter
- Dan Cantwell, American tennis player
- Dan Caplen (born 1992), British R&B singer, songwriter and musician
- Dan Carden (born 1986), British politician
- Dan Carlin (born 1965), American podcaster
- Dan Carlson (born 1970), American baseball player
- Dan Carmichael (born 1990), Scottish footballer
- Dan Carnevale (1918–2005), American baseball player, manager and scout
- Dan Caruso (born 1963), American businessman
- Dan Casey (baseball) (1862–1943), American baseball player
- Dan Casey (footballer) (born 1997), Irish footballer
- Dan Cashman (1933–2019), American television actor
- Dan Caslar (1888–1959), Italian composer
- Dan Caspi (1945–2017), Israeli media theorist
- Dan Cassidy (born 1961), American tennis player
- Dan Cassino (born 1980), American political scientist, historian, and poll analyzer
- Dan Castellaneta (born 1957), American actor
- Dan Castello (1836–1909), American circus operator
- Dan Cathy (born 1953), American businessman
- Dan Catsis (born 1959), English musician
- Dan Caulkins, American politician
- Dan Cavanaugh (born 1980), American ice hockey player
- Dan Ceman (born 1973), Canadian ice hockey player
- Dan Chameroy (born 1970), Canadian actor
- Dan Chamizer, broadcaster personality
- Dan Champagne, Connecticut politician
- Dan Chandler (born 1978), American rock singer
- Dan Chaon (born 1964), American writer
- Dan Charles (born 1985), American MMA fighter
- Dan Charnas (born 1967), American journalist
- Dan Chater (1870–1959), British politician
- Dan Chatterton (1820–1895), English pamphleteer
- Dan Cherry (born 1980), Welsh cricketer
- Dan Chiasson (born 1971), American poet
- Dan Chicoine (born 1957), Canadian ice hockey player
- Dan Chipka (born 1988), American football coach
- Dan Chisena (born 1997), American football player
- Dan Chmielinski (born 1993), American jazz bassist, synthesist and composer
- Dan Choi (born 1981), American LGBT activist
- Dan Christensen (1942–2007), American painter
- Dan Christian (born 1983), Australian cricketer
- Dan Christison (born 1972), American MMA fighter
- Dan Chupong (born 1981), Thai martial artist and actor
- Dan Church, Canadian ice hockey coach
- Dan Churchill (born 1989), Australian chef
- Dan Claitor, American politician
- Dan Clancy (born 1964), American business executive
- Dan Clark (ice hockey), Canadian ice hockey player
- Dan Clark, British actor, comedian and director
- Dan Clark (motivational speaker) (born 1955), American motivational speaker
- Dan Clark (Canadian football) (born 1988), Canadian football player from Saskatchewan
- Dan Clarke (born 1983), British open-wheel racing driver
- Dan Clawson (1948–2019), American sociologist
- Dan Clemens (1945–2019), American politician
- Dan Clews (born 1980), British singer-songwriter
- Dan Clodfelter (born 1950), American politician
- Dan Cloutier (born 1976), Canadian ice hockey player
- Dan Clute (born 1966), American politician
- Dan Coats (born 1943), American politician and diplomat
- Dan Cocoziello (born 1985), Lacrosse defenseman
- Dan Cody (born 1981), American football player
- Dan Coe (1941–1981), Romanian footballer
- Dan Coenen, American lawyer
- Dan Cogan, American film producer and director
- Dan Cohen (politician) (1936–2024), American author and politician
- Dan Cohen (academic) (born 1968), American historian
- Dan Cohen (journalist) (born 1977), American author, journalist and blogger
- Dan Baron Cohen (born 1957), British playwright and theatre director
- Dan Cohn-Sherbok (born 1945), American rabbi and scholar
- Dan Colburn, American musician
- Dan Colchico (1935–2014), American football player
- Dan Cole (rugby union) (born 1987), English rugby union player
- Dan H. Cole (1811–1881), American politician
- Dan Coleman (composer) (born 1972), American composer
- Dan Coleman (basketball) (born 1985), American basketball player
- Dan Coleman (American football) (1962–2026), American football player
- Dan Colen (born 1979), American painter and sculptor
- Dan Collette (born 1985), Luxembourgish footballer
- Dan Collins (baseball) (1854–1883), American baseball player
- Dan Collins (journalist) (1943–2024), American journalist
- Dan Collins (footballer) (1872–1925), Australian rules footballer
- Dan Collins (American football) (born 1976), American football player
- Dan Colman (born 1990), American poker player
- Dan Jack Combs (1924–2002), American judge
- Dan Comiskey (born 1972), Canadian football player
- Dan Comyn (1872–1949), Irish cricketer
- Dan Concholar (1939–2017), American Visual Artist
- Dan Condurache (born 1952), Romanian film actor
- Dan Conlin (born 1964), Canadian historian
- Jimmy Dan Conner (born 1953), American basketball player
- Dan Conners (1942–2019), American football player
- Dan Connolly (computer scientist) (born 1967), American computer scientist
- Dan Connolly (American football) (born 1982), American football player
- Dan Connor (American football) (born 1985), American football player and coach
- Dan Connor (footballer) (born 1981), Irish footballer and coach
- Radu Dan Constantinescu (born 1955), Romanian physicist
- Dan Conway (born 1985), English cricketer
- Dan Coogan (1875–1942), American baseball player and coach
- Dan Cook (1926–2008), American newspaper sports writer
- Dan Cooper (born 1946), American media entrepreneur & author
- Dan Corcoran, several people
- Dan Corder (born 1993), South African radio personality
- Dan Cordtz (1927–2019), American journalist
- Dan Corneliusson (born 1961), Swedish footballer
- Dan Corry, British special advisor
- Dan Corry (equestrian) (1902–1990), Irish equestrian
- Dan Corson (born 1964), American artist
- Dan Cortes (born 1987), American baseball player
- Dan Cortese (born 1967), American actor
- Dan Costa (musician) (born 1989), British jazz pianist and composer
- Dan Costa (journalist), American journalist
- Dan Costa (scientist), American ecologist and physiologist
- Dan Costello (baseball) (1891–1936), American baseball player
- Dan E. Costello (born 1909), American politician
- Dan Cotter (1867–1935), American baseball player
- Dan Coudreaut (born 1965), American chef
- Dan Coughlan (Blackrock hurler) (born 1870), Irish hurler
- Dan Coughlan (St Finbarr's hurler), Irish hurler
- Dan Coughlin (sportscaster) (1938–2024), American journalist
- Dan Coultas (born 1989), Scottish field hockey player
- Dan Coulter (1975–2024), Canadian politician
- Dan Counce (born 1951), American soccer player
- Dan Coupe (1885–1954), English footballer
- Dan Cousineau (born 1975), Canadian ice hockey player and coach
- Dan Covey (born 1958), American lighting designer and projections designer
- Dan Cox (born 1974), American politician
- Dan Coyle (1915–1972), Irish hammer thrower
- Dan Cragg (born 1939), American science-fiction writer
- Dan Craig (born 1980), American basketball coach
- Dan Cramer (basketball) (born 1952), American basketball player
- Dan Cramer (born 1985), American mixed martial artist
- Dan Crane (1936–2019), American politician and dentist
- Dan Crane (footballer) (born 1984), English footballer
- Dan Craven (born 1983), Namibian racing cyclist
- Dan Cray (born 1977), American jazz pianist
- Dan Creedon (1868–1942), New Zealand boxer
- Dan Cregan, Australian politician
- Dan Crenshaw (born 1984), American politician
- Dan Crippen (born 1952), director of the Congressional Budget Office
- Dan Cristea (born 1949), Romanian skier
- Dan Croll (born 1990), English singer-songwriter
- Dan Cronin (born 1959), Illinois politician
- Dan Cronin (baseball) (1857–1885), American baseball player
- Dan Cross (born 1973), American basketball player
- Dan Crow (musician), American musician
- Dan Crowley (rugby union) (born 1965), Australia international rugby union player
- Dan Crowley (Canadian football) (born 1973), American football player
- Dan Cruce, American politician
- Dan Cruickshank (born 1949), British architectural historian and television presenter
- Dan Crummell, Canadian politician
- Dan Cullen (born 1984), Australian cricketer
- Dan Cullinane, American politician
- Dan Cummins (born 1977), American comedian and host
- Dan Cunliffe (1875–1937), English footballer
- Dan Cunneen (born 1963), American musician and DJ
- Dan Cunningham (footballer) (1907–1994), Australian rules footballer
- Dan Cunningham (1917–2001), British actor
- Dan Curley (born 1978), American football player
- Dan Currams (born 1987), Irish hurler and Gaelic footballer
- Dan Curran (born 1976), American football player and coach
- Dan Currie (1935–2017), American football player
- Dan Currie (ice hockey) (born 1968), Canadian ice hockey player
- Dan Currie (footballer) (1935–1992), Scottish footballer
- Dan Curry, American visual effects producer
- Dan Curtin (politician) (1898–1980), Australian politician
- Dan Curtin (footballer) (born 2005), Australian rules football player
- Dan Curtis (1927–2006), American television and film director, writer, and producer

== D ==
- Dan Dailey (1915–1978), American actor and dancer
- Dan Dailey (glass artist) (born 1947), American artist
- Dan Dakich (born 1962), American sports radio host
- Dan Daley, American politician
- Dan Daly (1854–1904), American actor and comedian
- Dan Danglo (1925–2020), American cartoonist
- Dan Daniel (sportswriter) (1890–1981), American sportswriter
- Dan Daniel (politician) (1914–1988), American politician
- Dan Daniel (radio personality) (1934–2016), American radio presenter
- Dan Daniels (sportscaster) (1922–2012), American sportscaster
- Dan Daniels (politician) (1908–1991), Canadian politician
- Dan Danino (1911–1998), Welsh thoracic surgeon
- Dan Danknick, American physicist and roboticist
- Dan Darragh (1946–2025), American football player
- Dan Daub (1868–1951), American baseball player
- Dan E. Davidson, American linguist
- Dan Davidson, Canadian country singer and songwriter
- Dan Davin (1913–1990), New Zealand writer
- Dan Dawson (born 1981), Canadian lacrosse player
- Dan Dawson (politician), American politician
- Dan Deacon (born 1981), American electronic musician
- Dan Deasy (born 1966), American politician
- Dan Debicella (born 1974), American politician, Connecticut State Senator
- Dan DeBono (born 1964), American novelist
- Dan DeCarlo (1919–2001), American cartoonist
- Dan DeGrow (born 1953), American politician
- Dan DeKeyser (born 1990), American ice hockey player
- Dan Delany, New Zealand lawn bowler
- Dan Delaunay (born 1995), French footballer
- Dan DeLeeuw, visual effects artist and director
- Dan Delgado (born 1991), Mexican footballer
- Dan Delp (born 1964), American politician
- Dan DeLuca (born 1970), American actor
- Dan DeMent (born 1978), American baseball coach
- Dan DeMichele (born 1948), American baseball and ice hockey player
- Dan Demole (born 1979), American entrepreneur
- Dan Dempsey (1901–1960), Australian rugby league footballer
- Dan Denney, American aircraft engineer
- Dan DePalma (born 1989), American football player
- Dan DeQuille (1829–1898), American author, journalist and humorist
- Dan Dercher (born 1976), American football player
- Dan Dernulc, American politician
- Dan DeRose (born 1962), American football player
- Dan DeSantis (1918–2004), American football player
- Dan Desdunes (c. 1870–1929), American musician
- Dan Deșliu (1927–1992), Romanian poet
- Dan Desmond (1913–1964), Irish Labour Party politician
- Dan Dever (born 1946), Canadian gridiron football player
- Dan Devitt (1916–2003), Irish hurler
- Dan DeVos, American ice hockey executive
- Dan Dhanoa (born 1959), Indian actor, model and sailor
- Dan Diaconescu (born 1967), Romanian journalist, politician, presenter, founder and owner
- Dan DiCenzo (born 1979), American football coach
- Dan Dickau (born 1978), American basketball player
- Dan Dickel (born 1952), American football player
- Dan Dickerson (born 1958), American sportscaster
- Dan DiDio (born 1959), American comic book editor
- Dan Dierdorf (born 1949), American football player
- Dan Diker, Jewish activist
- Dan Dillabough, Canadian television writer
- Dan Dilworth (1942–2007), American ice hockey player
- Dan DiMicco (born 1950), American businessman
- Dan Dineen, Irish Gaelic footballer
- Dan Diner (born 1946), Israeli-German historian and political writer
- Dan Dinneen (1870–1948), American politician
- Dan Dion (born 1970), American photographer and comedy producer
- Dan Dobbek (1934–2023), American baseball player
- Dan Dockstader (born 1958), American politician
- Dan Dodd (born 1978), American politician
- Dan W. Dodson (1907–1995), American sociology professor
- Dan Doll (born 1969), Canadian luger
- Dan Domenech, American actor
- Dan Donahue (born 1987), Massachusetts politician
- Dan Donegan (born 1968), American guitarist
- Dan Donigan (born 1966), American soccer player
- Dan Donnelly (singer) (born 1974), Northern Irish singer
- Dan Donnelly (boxer) (1788–1820), Irish boxer
- Dan Donovan (keyboardist) (born 1962), British musician
- Dan Donovan (guitarist) (born 1960), British musician
- Dan Donovan (politician) (born 1956), American politician & attorney
- Dan Dooley (born 1990), Irish hurler
- Dan Doona, Irish Gaelic footballer
- Dan Doornink (born 1956), American football player
- Dan Dorazio (1952–2024), American football coach
- Dan Dorfman (1931–2012), American journalist
- Dan Dorion (born 1963), American ice hockey player
- Dan Dorman (born 1962), American politician
- Dan Dorsey (born 1976), American rugby union player
- Dan Dotson (born 1962), American auctioneer
- Dan Doubiago (born 1960), American football player
- Dan Dougherty, American basketball coach
- Dan Douthwaite (born 1997), English cricketer
- Dan Dowling, American cartoonist
- Dan Doyle (basketball), American basketball coach
- Dan Doyle (politician), American politician and attorney
- Dan Doyle (footballer) (1864–1918), Scottish footballer
- Dan Doyle (music producer), American record producer
- Dan Dries (born 1988), American ice hockey player
- Dan Driessen (born 1951), American baseball player
- Dan Drinan (born 1960), American racing driver
- Dan Droege (born 1955), American soccer player
- Dan Drown (born 1942), American water polo player and lifeguard
- Dan Droz (born 1950), American sculptor
- Dan Druff (born 1969), American musician
- Dan Drummond (1891–1949), Scottish footballer
- Dan Dryden (1944–2016), American politician
- Dan Drysdale (1901–1987), Scottish rugby union player
- Dan Dubeau, Canadian police commissioner
- Dan Duchaine (1952–2000), American bodybuilder, steroid promoter
- Dan the Dude, New York criminal and cafe owner
- Dan Duffy (born 1966), American politician
- Dan Duffy (artist), American artist
- Dan Dufour (born 1960), American football player
- Dan Dugan (baseball) (1907–1968), American baseball player
- Dan Dugan (audio engineer) (born 1943), American audio engineer
- Dan Dugdale (1864–1934), American baseball player and manager
- Dan Dugmore (born 1949), American pedal steel guitarist
- Dan Dumoulin (born 1953), American baseball player
- Dan Duncan (1933–2010), American businessman
- Dan Dungaciu (born 1968), Romanian sociologist
- Dan Dunleavy (born 1966), Canadian Sportscaster
- Dan Dunn (painter) (born 1957), American painter
- Dan Dunn (writer) (born 1968), American writer
- Dan Dunne (1908–1984), Irish hurler
- Dan Duquette (born 1958), Baseball executive
- Dan Duran (baseball) (born 1954), American baseball player
- Dan Duran (broadcaster), Canadian actor and broadcaster
- Dan Duryea (1907–1968), American actor
- Dan Duščak (born 2002), Slovenian basketball player
- Dan Duțescu (1918–1992), Romanian academic
- Dan Duva (1951–1996), American boxer
- Dan Duyu (1897–1972), Chinese film director
- Dan Dworkin (born 1972), American screenwriter and television producer
- Dan Dworsky (1927–2022), American architect

== E ==
- Dan Earl (born 1974), American college basketball coach
- Dan Eastman (1946–2010), American politician
- Dan Eaton (born 1956), American politician
- Dan Eaves (born 1975), British racing driver
- Dan K. Eberhart (born 1979), American businessman
- Dan Eberle (born 1974), American actor
- Dan Eckman (born 1984), American director, writer and producer
- Dan Eggen (born 1970), Norwegian footballer and former player
- Dan Ehrenkrantz, American reconstruction rabbi
- Dan Einbinder (born 1989), Israeli footballer
- Dan Einstein (1960–2022), American record producer
- Dan Ekborg (born 1955), Swedish actor
- Dan Ekner (1927–1975), Swedish footballer
- Dan Eldad, Israeli lawyer
- Dan Eldon (1970–1993), British-born Kenyan photojournalist, artist and activist
- Dan Eley (1914–2015), British chemist
- Dan Eliasson (born 1961), Swedish lawyer and civil servant
- Dan Elkan (born 1978), American singer-songwriter
- Dan Elmer (1915–2002), American football player and coach
- Dan Emmett (1815–1904), American entertainer and composer
- Dan W. Emmett (1886–1966), American politician
- Dan Empfield, triathlon entrepreneur
- Dan Engel (born 1976), American software entrepreneur
- Dan Engelstad (born 1984), basketball player and coach
- Dan Engler (born 1977), American professional wrestler
- Dan Enos (born 1968), American football player and coach
- Dan Enright (1917–1992), American television producer
- Dan Erez (1933–2015), Israeli basketball player
- Dan Erickson (born 1984), American screenwriter
- Dan Eriksson (born 1977), Swedish handball player
- Dan Erlewine, American luthier
- Dan Escott (born 1996), English cricketer
- Dan Estabrook (born 1969), American photographer
- Dan Estes (1888–1944), American sports coach
- Dan Etete (born 1945), Nigerian politician
- Dan Eubanks (born 1970), American politician
- Dan Euser, Canadian landscape architect
- Dan Evensen (born 1974), Norwegian kickboxer and mixed martial artist
- Dan Evins (1935–2012), American entrepreneur and founder of Cracker Barrel
- Dan Ewing (born 1985), Australian actor

== F ==
- Dan Fabian (born 1954), American politician
- Dan Faehnle, American guitarist from Ohio
- Dan Fagin (born 1963), American journalist
- Dan Falk, Canadian science journalist
- Dan Fallows (born 1973), British aerodynamicist
- Dan Fallshaw (born 1973), Australian filmmaker
- Dan Falzon (born 1972), Australian actor
- Dan Fante (1944–2015), American dramatist
- Dan Farber (born 1987), Israeli musician
- Dan Farmer (born 1962), American computer security researcher
- Dan Farrell, Canadian ice hockey player
- Dan Farthing (born 1969), Canadian wide receiver player of Canadian football in the CFL
- Dan Fascinato (born 1961), Canadian ice hockey player
- Dan Fâșie (born 1987), Romanian judoka
- Dan Faulk (born 1969), American jazz musician
- Dan Fawcus, English footballer and administrator
- Dan Feehan (1880–1946), Australian rules footballer
- Dan Feeney (born 1994), American football player
- Dan Feferman, speaker, author, and analyst of Israel
- Dan Fefferman, American church leader and activist
- Dan Fegan (1962–2018), American sports agent and lawyer
- Dan Alberto Fellus (born 1987), Norwegian-Israeli footballer
- Dan Feltes (born 1979), American politician
- Dan Ferrigno (born 1953), American football player
- Dan Ferro (1960–2022), American actor
- Dan Ferrone (born 1958), Canadian football player
- Dan E. Fesman, American screenwriter
- Dan Fesperman (born 1955), American novelist
- Dan Feuerriegel (born 1981), Australian actor
- Dan Feyen (born 1968), American politician
- Dan Feyer, American crossword puzzle solver and editor
- Dan Ficca (born 1939), American football player
- Dan Ficke, American basketball coach
- Dan Fike (born 1961), American football player
- Dan H. Fincher (born 1931), American politician
- Dan Findlay, record producer
- Dan Finnerty (born 1970), American actor, comedian and singer
- Dan Firova (born 1956), American baseball player
- Dan Fish (born 1990), Welsh rugby union player
- Dan Fishbach, American theater director
- Dan Fishback (born 1981), American dramatist
- Dan Flanagan (1899–1960), American judge
- Dan Flannery (1891–1967), Australian rugby league footballer
- Dan Flavin (1933–1996), American minimalist artist
- Dan Flavin (politician) (1957–2024), American politician
- Dan Fleisch, American physicist
- Dan Florio (died 1965), American boxing manager and trainer
- Dan Focht (born 1977), Canadian ice hockey player
- Dan Fog (1919–2000), Danish music antiquarian and publisher
- Dan Fogel (born 1948), American jazz organist
- Dan Fogelberg (1951–2007), American singer-songwriter
- Dan Fogelman (born 1976), American screenwriter and producer
- Dan Fogler (born 1976), American actor, comedian and writer
- Dan Foldberg, American football player
- Dan Folger (1943–2006), American singer and songwriter
- Dan Folke (1906–1954), Danish composer and theater director
- Dan Footman (born 1969), American football player
- Dan Ford (born 1952), American baseball player
- Dan Forden (born 1963), American sound programmer
- Dan Foreman (born 1953), American politician from Idaho
- Dan Forest (born 1967), American politician
- Dan Forestal (1983–2021), American politician
- Dan Forrest (born 1978), American composer, pianist, educator and music editor
- Dan Forsberg (born 1934), Swedish speedway rider
- Dan Forshaw (born 1981), British musician
- Dan Forsman (born 1958), American professional golfer
- Dan Fortin, Canadian businessman
- Dan Fortmann (1916–1995), American football player
- Dan Fosse (1918–1987), Norwegian actor
- Dan Fotu (born 1999), New Zealand basketball player
- Dan Fouts (born 1951), American football player
- Dan Fraga (born 1973), American comic book writer and artist
- Dan France (born 1991), American football player
- Dan Franck (born 1952), French novelist and screenwriter
- Dan M. Frangopol, American civil engineer
- Dan Frank (1954–2021), American editorial director
- Dan Frankel (British politician) (1900–1988), British politician
- Dan Frankel (American politician) (born 1956), American politician
- Dan Frantz (born 1977), American football player
- Dan Fraser (born 1963), Canadian businessman
- Dan Frawley (1882–1967), Australian rugby league footballer
- Dan Frawley (ice hockey) (born 1962), Canadian ice hockey player
- Dan Frazer (1921-2011), American actor
- Dan Frazier (rugby union) (born 1988), English rugby union footballer
- Dan Frazier (artist) (born 1945), American artist
- Dan Frechette (born 1976), Canadian entertainer, singer-songwriter and instrumentalist
- Dan Fredinburg (1981–2015), American technology executive, climate activist, explorer and entrepreneur
- Dan Freed (born 1959), American mathematician
- Dan Fridgen (born 1959), Canadian ice hockey player
- Dan Friedkin, American businessman
- Dan Friel (musician), American electronic musician
- Dan Friel (1860–1911), Scottish footballer
- Dan Frisa (born 1955), American politician
- Dan Frischman (born 1959), American actor
- Dan Fritsche (born 1985), Swiss-American ice hockey player
- Dan Fröberg (born 1964), Swedish footballer
- Dan Froomkin, American journalist
- Dan Froot, American performance artist, writer, dancer, composer and saxophonist
- Dan Frost (cyclist) (born 1961), Danish cyclist
- Dan Frost (rugby union) (born 1997), English rugby union player
- Dan Froyliche (born 1992), Israeli sailor
- Dan Furey (1909–1993), Irish dance teacher and fiddle player
- Dan Furnival (born 1978), English cricketer
- Dan Furphy, American politician
- Dan Futterman (born 1967), American screenwriter and actor
- Dan Fylstra, American software specialist

== G ==
- Dan Gable (born 1948), American wrestler
- Dan Gadzuric (born 1978), Dutch basketball player
- Dan Gaiewski, American politician
- Dan Gakeler (born 1964), American baseball player
- Dan Găldean (born 1974), Romanian footballer
- Dan Gale (born 1989), English cricketer
- Dan Gallimore (born 2003), English footballer
- Dan Gallin (1931–2025), Polish-born trade unionist
- Dan Galorath, American software developer
- Dan Gamble, Scottish rugby union player
- Dan Gardopée, American electronic musician
- Dan Gargan (born 1982), American soccer player
- Dan Garrett, American football coach
- Dan Edward Garvey (1886–1974), Arizona politician
- Dan Gasaway (born 1966), American politician
- Dan Gaspar (born 1955), Portuguese football coach
- Dan Gaton, Israeli ophthalmologist
- Dan Gattis (born 1967), American politician
- Dan Gatto (born 1970), American singer
- Dan Gauthier (born 1963), American actor
- Dan Gawrecki (1943–2025), Czech historian
- Dan Gayman, Christian Identity minister
- Dan Gediman (born 1961), American radio producer
- Dan Geer, American computer scientist
- Dan Gehlbach (born 1977), American politician
- Dan Gelber (born 1960), American politician
- Dan Geoffrion (born 1958), Canadian ice hockey player
- Dan Georgakas (1938–2021), American anarchist poet and historian
- Dan Georgiadis (1922–1998), Greek footballer and manager
- Dan Gerber (born 1940), American writer
- Dan Geriot, American basketball coach
- Dan Gerson (1966–2016), American screenwriter and voice actor
- Dan Gertler (born 1973), Israeli billionaire businessman in natural resources
- Dan Christian Ghattas, intersex activist
- Dan Gheesling (born 1983), American television personality
- Dan Gheno (born 1955), American painter
- Dan Gheorghiu, Romanian fencer
- Dan Giancola (born 1970), Canadian football player
- Dan Gibbs (born c.1976), American politician
- Dan Gibson (1922–2006), Canadian photographer, cinematographer and sound recordist
- Dan Giese (born 1977), American baseball player
- Dan Gifford, American-born Canadian bishop
- Dan Gilkes (born 2002), English speedway rider
- Dan Gill (born 1982), American artistic gymnast
- Dan Gillerman (born 1944), Israeli diplomat
- Dan Gillmor, American technology writer
- Dan Gilroy (born 1959), American screenwriter and film director
- Dan Gilroy (musician) (born 1947), American singer
- Dan Gilvezan (born 1950), American actor
- Dan Gimadu, Anglican bishop
- Dan Giordano (born 1989), American gridiron football player
- Dan Gîrleanu (born 1954), Romanian volleyball player
- Dan Gitlin (born 1983), American film editor
- Dan Giușcă (1904–1988), Romanian geologist
- Dan Gladden (born 1957), American baseball player
- Dan Glading (born 1986), American lacrosse player
- Dan Glans (born 1947), Swedish steeplechase runner
- Dan Glass, American baseball executive
- Dan Glazer (born 1996), Israeli footballer
- Dan Gleeson (politician) (1914–1994), Australian politician
- Dan Gleeson (born 1985), English footballer
- Dan Glickberg, American businessman
- Dan Glickman (born 1944), president of the Motion Picture Association of America, former US Secretary of Agriculture
- Dan Glimne (born 1947), Swedish games expert and politician
- Dan Goddard (born 1947), American politician
- Dan Gode, American academic
- Dan Godfread (born 1967), American basketball player
- Dan Goggin (composer) (born 1943), American dramatist
- Dan Goggin (rugby union) (born 1994), Irish rugby union player
- Dan Goich (born 1944), American football player
- Joe Dan Gold (1942–2011), American basketball player and coach
- Dan Goldberg (tennis) (born 1967), American tennis player
- Dan Golden (filmmaker), American filmmaker
- Dan Goldfuss (born 1976), Israeli brigadier general
- Dan Goldie (born 1963), American tennis player
- Dan Golding, Australian academic, composer and writer
- Dan Goldman (writer) (born 1974), American writer, cartoonist, and producer
- Dan Goldman (born 1976), American politician and attorney
- Dan Goldstein (1954–2022), Israeli entrepreneur
- Dan Goldstick (born 1940), Canadian professor and political activist
- Dan Golenpaul (1900–1974), American radio producer
- Dan Gonzales (born 1953), American baseball player
- Dan Gonzalez (born 1974), American gridiron football player
- Dan Goodley (born 1972), English academic
- Dan Goodwin (born 1955), American climber
- Dan Gookin (born 1960), American politician and author
- Dan Gooley, American baseball coach
- Dan Goor (born 1975), American screenwriter and producer
- Dan Gordon (animator) (1902–1970), American animator
- Dan Gordon (screenwriter) (born 1947), Israeli-American writer and producer
- Dan Gordon (actor) (born 1961), Northern Irish actor, director and playwright
- Dan Gordon (Scottish footballer) (1881–1958), Scottish footballer
- Dan Gordon (Gaelic footballer), Irish Gaelic footballer
- Dan Gore (born 2004), English footballer
- Dan Gorlin, American computer game programmer and designer
- Dan Gosling (born 1990), English association football player
- Dan Gottfried (born 1939), Israeli jazz pianist and music educator
- Dan Goughnour, American politician
- Dan Gouré, American academic
- Dan Grace (1885–1957), Irish hurler
- Dan Graham (1942–2022), American artist
- Dan Graham (baseball) (born 1954), American baseball player
- Dan M. Granoff (born 1944), American physician-scientist
- Dan Grant, USAID officer
- Dan Gratton (born 1966), Canadian ice hockey player
- Dan Graur (born 1953), American scientist
- Dan Gray (footballer) (born 1989), English footballer
- Dan Gray (American football) (born 1956), American football player
- Dan Grayson (1967–2021), American football linebacker
- Dan Greaney, American television writer
- Dan Grech-Marguerat (born 1981), English record producer and mixer
- Dan Grecu (1950–2024), Romanian artistic gymnast
- Dan Greenbaum (born 1969), American volleyball player
- Dan Greenburg (1936–2023), American writer
- Dan Gregor (born 1984), American comedian, writer, director and producer
- Dan Gregory, American musician
- Dan Gresswell, English veterinary surgeon
- Dan Griffey (born 1970), American politician
- Dan Griffiths (rugby union, born 1979) (born 1979), Welsh rugby union player
- Dan Griffiths (rugby union, born 1857) (1857–1936), Wales international rugby union footballer
- Dan Grigore (born 1943), Romanian classical pianist
- Dan Grimaldi (born 1946), American actor and mathematics professor
- Dan Grimm (1941–2018), American football player
- Dan Grimm (politician) (born 1949), 20th Treasurer of Washington
- Dan Griner (1888–1950), American baseball player
- Dan Gritti, American football coach
- Dan Gronkowski (born 1985), American football player
- Dan Grossman, American politician
- Dan Grunfeld (born 1984), American professional basketball player
- Dan Guenther, American poet
- Dan Gurewitch (born 1984), American comedian, writer, and actor
- Dan Gurney (1931–2018), American racing car driver
- Dan Gusfield, American computer scientist
- Dan Guterman, American screenwriter and television producer
- Dan Gutman (born 1955), American children's writer
- Dan Gwadosky (1954–2011), American politician

== H ==
- Dan Habedi (born 1952), South African politician
- Dan Habib, American documentary film director, producer, and cinematographer
- Dan Hacker (born 1982), American ice hockey player
- Dan Haddad (born 1994), Lebanese music video director
- Dan Haerle (1937–2024), American jazz musician
- Dan Hageman (born 1976), American screenwriter and television producer
- Dan Haggerty (1942–2016), American actor
- Dan Haifley, American journalist
- Dan Haigh (born 1980), British musician
- Dan Haley (1940–2013), American football player
- Dan Halldorson (1952–2015), Canadian professional golfer
- Dan Halloran (born 1971), American lawyer
- Dan Halperin, Israeli computer scientist
- Dan Halsted (born 1962), American film producer and talent manager
- Dan Haluptzok, American curler
- Dan Halutz (born 1948), Israeli Air Force general
- Dan Hamhuis (born 1982), Canadian ice hockey player
- Dan Hammer, American economist
- Dan "Two Dogs" Hampton, American Air Force officer
- Dan Hampton (born 1957), American football player
- Dan Hanford (born 1991), Welsh footballer
- Dan Hanganu (1939–2017), Romanian-Canadian architect
- Dan Hanlon (1866–1951), American silent film actor
- Dan Hannebery (born 1991), Australian rules footballer
- Dan Hannon (born 1973), American record producer, audio engineer, mixer, songwriter, and musician
- Dan Happe (born 1998), English footballer
- Dan Harding (born 1983), English footballer
- Dan Haren (born 1980), American baseball player
- Dan Harmon (born 1973), American actor, producer, and writer
- Dan Harnedy (1942–2024), Irish Gaelic footballer and hurler
- Dan Harries, American artist and professor
- Dan Harrigan (born 1955), American swimmer
- Dan Hartleb (born 1966), American baseball coach
- Dan Hartman (1950–1994), American singer-songwriter
- Dan Haseltine (born 1973), American singer
- Dan Haskett (born 1952), American animator
- Dan Hausel, American polymath
- Dan Hauser (born 1942), American politician
- Dan Hawkins (musician) (born 1976), British guitarist
- Dan Hawkins (gridiron football) (born 1960), American gridiron football player and coach
- Dan Hawkins (footballer) (born 2001), Welsh footballer
- Dan Hayden, American artistic gymnast
- Dan Hayden (baseball) (born 1984), American college baseball coach
- Dan Healey (born 1957), British historian
- Dan Healy (detective) (1895–1980), Chicago detective
- Dan Healy (soundman) (born 1946), American audio engineer
- Dan Heap (1925–2014), Canadian politician and Anglican priest
- Dan Heath (born 1973), American author and speaker
- Dan Hedaya (born 1940), American actor
- Dan Heefner, American college baseball coach
- Dan Hegarty, Irish broadcaster
- Dan Hegeman (born 1963), American politician
- Dan Heilman (1922–1966), American artist
- Dan Heimiller (born 1962), American poker player
- Dan Held (1961–2015), Canadian ice hockey player
- Dan Hellie (born 1975), American sports anchor
- Dan Helmer (born 1981), American politician
- Dan Hemingway (born 1989), English rugby union player
- Dan Hemmert, American businessman and politician
- Dan Henderson (born 1970), American Olympic wrestler and mixed martial arts fighter
- Dan Henderson (sledge hockey) (born 1965), American Sled hockey player
- Dan Henderson (basketball), American basketball player
- Dan Fenno Henderson (1921–2001), American university professor
- Dan L. Hendricks (born 1958), American horse trainer
- Dan Hendrycks, American machine learning researcher
- Dan Henig, American singer-songwriter
- Dan Henk (born 1972), American artist and writer
- Dan Hennah (born 1950), New Zealand production designer
- Dan Hennessey (1942–2024), American-born Canadian voice actor
- Dan Henning (born 1942), American football player and coach
- Dan Henry (1913–2012), Inventor of directional pavement markings
- Dan Hentschel (born 1996), American performance artist and satirist
- Dan Herbeck (born 1954), American author and journalist
- Dan Herren (1888–1956), American football player
- Dan Herron (born 1989), American football player
- Dan Hester (1948–2023), American basketball player
- Dan Hett, English artist
- Dan Hewitt Owens (born 1947), American actor, director and screenwriter
- Dan Hicken (born 1963), American television sportscaster
- Dan Hickey (born 1957), American drummer
- Dan Hicks (singer) (1941–2016), American singer-songwriter and musician
- Dan Hicks (sportscaster) (born 1962), American sportscaster
- Dan Hicks (archaeologist) (born 1972), British archaeologist and anthropologist
- Dan Hicks (actor) (1951–2020), American actor
- Dan Higgins (born 1957), American saxophone and woodwind player
- Dan Highcock (born 1981), British wheelchair basketball player
- Dan Hildebrand (born 1962), British actor
- Dan Hill (born 1954), Canadian singer
- Dan Hill (American football) (1917–1989), American football player
- Dan Hill (rugby league) (born 2002), English rugby league footballer
- Dan Hindmarsh (born 1998), English rugby league footballer
- Dan Hinote (born 1977), American ice hockey player and coach
- Dan Hinton (1953–1994), Canadian ice hockey player
- Dan Hipgrave (born 1975), English musician and writer
- Dan Hipkiss (born 1982), England international rugby union player
- Dan Hipsher (born 1954), American basketball player-coach
- Dan Hirschberg (born 1949), American computer scientist
- Dan Hirschhorn (born 1901), American national political journalist
- Dan Hoard, American sportscaster
- Dan Hodges (born 1969), British journalist
- Dan Hodgson (born 1965), Canadian ice hockey player
- Dan Hodgson (cricketer) (born 1990), English cricketer
- Dan Hoerner (born 1969), American guitarist, vocalist and author
- Dan Holdsworth (born 1974), British photographer
- Dan Hollinshead (born 1995), New Zealand rugby union player
- Dan Holman (born 1990), English footballer
- Dan Holowaychuk (born 1962), Canadian curler
- Dan van Holst Pellekaan, Australian politician
- Dan Hong, Australian chef, restaurateur and television host
- Dan Hooker (born 1990), New Zealand mixed martial artist and former kickboxer
- Dan Hornbuckle (born 1980), Native American mixed martial artist
- Dan Hörning (born 1970), Swedish writer and podcaster
- Dan Hornsby (1900–1951), American singer and musician
- Dan Horrigan, American politician
- Dan Horwits, American sports agent
- Dan Houdek (born 1989), Czech footballer
- Dan Housego (born 1988), English cricketer
- Dan Houser (born 1973), English video game producer
- Dan Houston (born 1997), Australian rules footballer
- Dan Houx, American politician and businessman
- Dan Howard (born 1976), Australian volleyball player
- Dan Howbert (born 1987), Japanese footballer
- Dan Howe (born 1970), Canadian canoeist
- Dan Howell (politician), American politician
- Dan Howley (1885–1944), American baseball player and manager
- Dan Hubbs (born 1971), American baseball coach
- Dan Huberty (born 1968), American businessman and politician
- Dan Hudson (born 1959), Canadian artist
- Dan Hughes (basketball) (born 1955), American basketball coach
- Dan Hughes (Nebraska politician) (born 1956), American politician
- Dan Hugo (born 1985), South African triathlete
- Dan Hultmark (born 1949), Swedish biologist
- Dan Humphries (born 1979), British-Canadian bobsledder
- Dan Hunt (born 1986), Australian rugby league footballer
- Dan Hunt (American football), American football coach
- Frederic Dan Huntington (1819–1904), American bishop
- Dan Hurley (born 1973), American basketball coach
- Dan Hurlin (born 1955), American puppeteer and performance artist
- Dan Huseman (born 1952), American politician
- Dan van Husen (1945–2020), German actor
- Dan Hutchison (born 1968), American politician
- Dan Hylander (born 1954), Musical artist
- Dan Hynes (New Hampshire politician), American politician

== I ==
- Dan Ialá, Bissau-Guinean politician
- Dan Iannuzzi (1934–2004), Canadian newspaper publisher
- Dan Iassogna (born 1969), American baseball umpire
- Dan Onuorah Ibekwe (1919–1978), Nigerian jurist
- Dan Idema (born 1984), Canadian ice hockey and poker player
- Dan Ige (born 1991), American mixed martial artist
- Dan Ignat (born 1986), Romanian footballer
- Dan Iliakis (born 1982), Canadian ice hockey player
- Dan Ilic (born 1981), Australian comedian
- Dan Illouz (born 1986), Israeli politician
- Dan Immerfall (born 1955), American speed skater
- Dan Ingalls (born 1944), American computer scientist
- Dan Ingle (born 1952), American politician
- Dan Ingram (1934–2018), American radio broadcaster
- Dan Innis (born 1963), American politician
- Dan Inosanto (born 1936), Filipino-American martial arts instructor
- Dan Mircea Ionel, American electrical engineer
- Mihai Dan Ionescu, Romanian footballer
- Dan Ireland (1949–2016), American-Canadian film producer & director
- Dan Irimiciuc (born 1949), Romanian fencer
- Dan Irons (born 1954), American football player
- Dan Irving (1854–1924), British politician
- Dan Isaack (born 1990), Argentine rugby union player
- Dan Issel (born 1948), American basketball player, coach, executive
- Dan Ito (born 1975), Japanese footballer
- Dan Itse (born 1958), American politician
- Dan Iuga (born 1954), Romanian sport shooter

== J ==
- Dan Jackart (born 1960), Canada international rugby union player
- Dan Jackson (defensive back) (born 2000), American football player
- Dan Jackson (American football coach), American football coach
- Dan Jacobs (trumpeter) (born 1942), American jazz musician
- Dan Jacobson (1929–2014), South African writer
- Dan Jaffé, Franco-Israeli historian in the history of religions
- Dan Jambor (born 1999), Czech footballer
- Dan Jancevski (born 1981), Macedonian-Canadian ice hockey player
- Dan Janjigian (born 1972), Armenian-American former bobsledder, former actor and political candidate
- Dan Jarvis (born 1972), British politician
- Dan Jawitz, South African film and television producer
- Dan Jeannotte (born 1981), Canadian actor
- Dan Jenkins (1928–2019), American author and sportswriter
- Dan Jennings (pitcher) (born 1987), American baseball player
- Dan Jennings (baseball manager) (born 1960), American baseball executive and manager
- Dan Jenson (born 1975), Australian squash player
- Dan Jessee (1901–1970), American baseball player
- Dan Jessup (1890–1967), Canadian politician
- Dan Jiggetts (born 1954), American football player
- Dan Jilek (1953–2002), American football player
- Dan Jinks, American film and television producer
- Dan Anton Johansen (born 1979), Danish footballer
- Dan Johansson (born 1950), Swedish speed skater
- Dan John (born 2001), Welsh rugby union player
- Dan Johnson (baseball) (born 1979), American baseball player
- Dan Johnson (American football) (born 1960), American football player
- Dan Johnson (Kansas politician) (1936–2014), American politician
- Dan Johnson (musician) (born 1985), American drummer
- Dan Johnson (economist) (born c.1969), American economist
- Dan Johnson (journalist) (born 1984), English journalist and presenter
- Dan Johnson (Kentucky politician) (1960–2017), American religious leader and legislator
- Dan Johnson (Utah politician), American politician
- Dan Curtis Johnson, American programmer and comic book writer
- Dan G. Johnson, American politician from Idaho
- Dan Johnston (politician) (1938–2016), American lawyer and politician
- Dan Jolley, American novelist and comic book writer
- Dan Jolly (1907–1990), American politician
- Dan Jones (composer), British composer, director and sound designer
- Dan Jones (politician) (1908–1985), British politician
- Dan Jones (Mormon) (1810–1862), Welsh Mormon missionary, steamboat captain.
- Dan Jones (New Zealand footballer), New Zealand footballer
- Dan Jones (writer) (born 1981), British historian and journalist
- Dan Jones (professor) (born 1952), American academic
- Dan Jones (footballer, born 1994) (born 1994), English footballer
- Dan Jones (digital creative director) (born 1979), British creative director, digital producer and television producer
- Dan Jones (rugby union, born 1996), Welsh rugby union player
- Dan Jones (American football) (born 1970), American football player
- Dan Jones (human rights education activist), British artist and human rights activist
- Dan Jones (rugby union, born 1907) (1907–1988), Welsh international rugby union player
- Dan E. Jones (1934–2018), American educator and political pollster
- Dan P. Jones (1856–1935), American politician from Arizona
- Dan Jooste (born 1998), South African rugby union player
- Dan Jorgensen (swimmer) (born 1968), American swimmer
- Dan Josefson, American writer
- Dan Joyce (born 1976), British stunt performer
- Dan Joye (born 1985), Venezuelan-born American luger
- Dan Jurgens (born 1959), American comics artist and writer
- Dan Justin (born 1955), American ice hockey player

== K ==
- Dan Kahan, American law professor
- Dan Kahn, American businessperson, author and marketeer
- Dan Kalb (born 1959), American politician
- Dan Kalman, American mathematician
- Dan Kamal (born 1951), American journalist
- Dan Kaminsky, (1979–2021), American computer security researcher
- Dan Kan, American entrepreneur
- Dan Kanter (born 1981), Canadian multi-instrumentalist, musical director, performance coach, and multi-platinum-selling songwriter/producer
- Dan Kapanke (born 1947), American politician
- Dan Karabin (born 1955), Slovak wrestler
- Dan Karaty (born 1976), American TV personality and dancer
- Dan Katchongva (1860–1972), Hopi traditional leader
- Dan Kaufman, American visual effects artist
- Dan Kavanagh (Gaelic footballer) (c. 1921–2008), Irish Gaelic footballer
- Dan Kavanagh, British rock drummer
- Dan Kayede, Ghanaian footballer
- Dan Kearney (1921–1984), Australian rules footballer
- Dan Kearns (1956–2022), Canadian football player
- Dan Keat (born 1987), New Zealand footballer
- Dan Keatings (born 1990), British artistic gymnast
- Dan Kecman (born 1948), American football player
- Dan Keczmer (born 1968), American ice hockey player
- Dan Keily (1892–1967), Australian rules footballer
- Dan Keir (born 1998), Australian rugby league footballer
- Dan Kellner (born 1976), American champion foil fencer
- Dan Kemp, several people
- Dan Kenan, American football player and coach
- Dan Kendra (born 1976), American football player
- Dan Kenefick (1888–1960), Irish hurler
- Dan Kennard (1883–1947), American baseball player
- Dan Kennis (1917–2006), American film producer
- Dan Kersch (born 1961), Luxembourgish politician
- Dan Kerschen (born 1952), American politician
- Dan Kerwin (1874–1960), American baseball player
- Dan Kesa (born 1971), Scottish-Canadian ice hockey player
- Dan Ketchum (born 1981), American swimmer
- Dan Kibet (born 2004), Ugandan runner
- Dan Kiely (born 1940), Irish politician
- Dan Kieran (born 1975), British travel writer and humourist
- Dan Kiernan (born 1980), British tennis player
- Dan Kiesel (born 1938), Israeli-German sports osteopath and physiotherapist
- Dan Kihlström (born 1957), Swedish politician
- Dan Kildee (born 1958), American politician
- Dan Kiley (1912–2004), American landscape architect
- Dan A. Killian (1880–1953), American football and baseball coach
- Dan Kimball (born 2000), American author
- Dan A. Kimball (1896–1970), U.S. Secretary of the Navy from 1951 to 1953
- Dan Kimosho (born 1984), Ugandan politician
- Dan King (skeptic) (1791–1864), American physician and skeptical writer
- Dan King (basketball) (1931–2003), American basketball player
- Dan Christie Kingman (1852–1916), United States Army general
- Dan Kirby (politician) (born 1958), American politician
- Dan Kirby (architect), American architect
- Dan Kirkup (born 1988), English footballer
- Dan Kirkwood (1900–1977), Scottish footballer
- Dan Klecko (born 1981), American football player
- Dan Klink (born 2007), Ghanaian footballer
- Dan Klippenstein (1939–1997), Canadian curler
- Dan Kloeffler (born 1976), American journalist
- Dan Klores (born 1949), American film producer
- Dan Kneen (1987–2018), Manx motorcycle racer
- Dan Knight (born 1953), American jazz musician
- Dan Knodl (born 1958), American politician
- Dan Knott (1879–1959), Canadian politician
- Dan Knott (footballer) (1918–2014), Australian rules footballer
- Dan Koehl (born 1959), French-Swedish zookeeper
- Dan Kogai (born 1969), Japanese open source developer and alpha blogger
- Dan Kohn (1972–2020), American entrepreneur
- Dan Kolb (born 1975), American baseball player
- Dan Kolov (1892–1940), Bulgarian professional wrestler
- Dan Kolsrud, American film producer
- Dan Kopelman, American actor
- Dan Koppen (born 1979), American football player
- Dan Kordic (born 1971), Canadian ice hockey player
- Dan Korneff (born 1982), American music producer, mixer and engineer
- Dan Kotowski (born 1967), American politician
- Dan Kotter, American Paralympic archer
- Dan Kovalik (born 1968), American lawyer
- Dan Kowarsky (born 1979), Canadian singer, B4-4/RyanDan
- Dan Krauss, American documentary filmmaker
- Dan Kratzer (born 1949), American football player
- Dan Kreider (born 1977), American football player
- Dan Krewski, Canadian physician
- Dan Kriel (born 1994), South African rugby union footballer
- Dan Kristiansen (born 1962), American politician from Washington
- Dan Kroffat (born 1945), Canadian retired professional wrestler and professional wrestling booker
- Dan Kronauge (born 1970), American tennis player
- Dan Kubiak (1938–1998), American educator and botanist
- Dan Kurzius (born 1971/1972), American billionaire, co-founder of Mailchimp
- Dan Kurzman (1922–2010), American journalist and author of military history books
- Dan Kutler (born 1970), American-born Israeli Olympic swimmer
- Dan Kuwali, Malawian brigadier general
- Dan Kuykendall (1924–2008), American politician and businessman

== L ==
- Dan La Botz (born 1945), American labor union activist, academic, journalist and author
- Dan Laak, American Olympic diver and coach
- Dan Labraaten (born 1951), Swedish ice hockey player
- Dan Lacey (1960–2022), American painter
- Dan V. Lackey (1877–1959), American urban developer
- Dan Lacksman (born 1950), Belgian composer and sound engineer
- Dan LaCosta (born 1986), Canadian ice hockey player
- Dan LaCouture (born 1977), American ice hockey player
- Dan Ladouceur (born 1973), Canadian lacrosse player
- Dan Lagana, American television writer and producer
- Dan Laikin, American business executive
- Dan Lakly (c. 1942–2007), American politician
- Dan Laksov (1940–2013), Norwegian-Swedish mathematician
- Dan Lally (1867–1936), American baseball player
- Dan Lam (born 1988), American sculptor
- Dan Lambton, American vocalist of Real Friends
- Dan Lancaster (rugby union) (born 2001), English rugby player
- Dan Lancaster, British record producer
- Dan Land (born 1965), American football player
- Dan Landrum, American musician
- Dan Landry (born 1970), American volleyball player
- Dan Lane (c. 1861–1940), Irish hurler
- Dan Langan, American baker
- Dan Langhi (born 1977), American basketball player
- Dan Lanigan, American producer and writer
- Dan Lanning (born 1986), American football player
- Dan Larhammar (born 1956), Swedish academic
- Dan Larkin, Irish rugby union player
- Dan LaRose (1939–2019), American football player
- Dan Larson, multiple people
- Dan Lashley, American actor and filmmaker
- Dan Lategan (born 2006), South African cricketer
- Dan Lauby (born 1960), American darts player
- Dan Laughlin, American politician from Pennsylvania
- Dan Lauria (born 1947), American actor
- Dan Laurin (born 1960), Swedish recorder player
- Dan Laursen (born 1960), American politician
- Dan Laustsen (born 1954), Danish cinematographer
- Dan Lauwers (born 1963), American politician
- Dan Lauzon (born 1988), American mixed martial artist
- Dan Lavery (born 1966), American professional musician
- Dan Lawson (born 1973), British ultramarathon runner
- Dan Le Batard (born 1968), American journalist
- Dan Leahy (1870–1903), American baseball player
- Dan Leal (born 1969), American pornographic actor and director
- Dan Leavy (born 1994), Irish rugby player
- Dan Lebental (born 1970), American film editor
- Dan Leckie (1949–1998), Canadian politician
- Dan Lederman (born 1972), American politician
- Dan Leegant, American actor, known for I'm Dangerous Tonight
- Dan LeFevour (born 1987), American gridiron football player
- Dan Lemmon, New Zealand visual effects artist
- Dan Lennon (1908–2002), American football and track and field coach
- Dan Leno (1860–1904), English music hall comedian
- Dan Lepard, Australian baker, food writer, photographer, television presenter and celebrity chef
- Dan Lerner, American television director
- Dan Lester, American costume designer
- Dan Lett (born 1959), Canadian actor
- Dan Levenson, multiple people
- Dan Levinson (born 1965), American musician
- Dan Levitan, American investment banker
- Dan Lewandowski (1928–1996), American baseball player
- Dan Lewis-Williams (born 1993), English cricketer
- Dan Liljenquist (born 1974), American politician
- Dan Lilker (born 1964), American musician
- Dan Lim (born 1952), Filipino politician
- Dan Lindsley (1925–2018), American geneticist
- Dan Liner (1922–1988), Israeli general
- Dan Linfoot (born 1988), English motorcycle racer
- Dan Lipinski (born 1966), American politician
- Dan Lissvik (born 1978), Swedish artist and musician
- Dan Little, First Gentleman of Oregon
- Dan Littman, American immunologist
- Dan Liu, Hong Kong Canadian fashion designer
- Dan Lobb (born 1972), British sports broadcaster
- Dan Locklair (born 1949), American composer
- Dan Lodboa (1946–2019), Canadian ice hockey player
- Dan Logan (born 1985), English musician
- Dan Logue (1950–2021), American politician
- Dan Lonergan, Australian sports broadcaster
- Dan Loney (born 1977), American football player
- Dan Long, multiple people
- Dan Lonowski (born 1962), American state senator
- Dan Lorge (born 1951), American voice actor
- Dan Lothian, American journalist
- Dan Lounsbury, American football coach
- Dan Lovén (1961–2019), Swedish sailor
- Dan Lovrović (born 1984), Croatian sailor
- Dan Lowe, American real estate developer
- Dan Lozano (born 1967), American sports agent
- Dan Lu (born 1987), Malawian artist
- Dan Lubin, American physicist and academic
- Dan Luger (born 1975), English rugby union footballer
- Dan Lungren (born 1946), American lawyer and politician
- Dan Lungu (born 1969), Romanian writer
- Dan Lupașcu (born 1962), Romanian jurist
- Dan Lurie (1923–2013), American bodybuilder
- Dan Luscombe, Australian guitarist, producer and composer
- Dan Luss (born 1938), American chemical engineer
- Dan Lusthaus, American writer
- Dan Lydiate (born 1987), Welsh rugby union player
- Dan Lyle (born 1970), American rugby union player

== M ==
- Dan Maag (born 1975), German film producer
- Dan Macaulay (born 1975), Canadian singer
- Dan Mackay (1894–1951), Scottish cricketer and soldier
- Dan MacNeill, American football coach
- Dan Maddicott, British children's television producer
- Dan Madesclaire (born 1993), French Counter-Strike player better known as apEX
- Dan Madigan, American television producer
- Dan Maff (born 1973), American professional wrestler
- Dan Maffei (born 1968), American politician
- Dan Magill (1921–2014), American tennis coach
- Dan Magnus (born 1956), American mixed martial artist
- Dan Mahoney, several people
- Dan Majerle (born 1965), American basketball player
- Dan T. Major (born 1973), Israeli chemist
- Dan Makhanya, South African politician and businessman
- Dan Malesela, South African soccer coach
- Dan Malone (born 1955), American journalist
- Dan Maloney (1950–2018), Canadian ice hockey player
- Dan Maluleke (born 1943), South African politician
- Dan Man, Belizean entertainer
- Dan Mandich (born 1960), Canadian ice hockey player
- Dan Mangan (born 1983), Canadian musician
- Dan Manucci (born 1957), American football player
- Dan Maraya (1946–2015), Nigerian musician
- Dan Marble (1810–1849), American actor
- Dan Margalit, multiple people
- Dan Marino (born 1961), American football player
- Dan Markel (1972–2014), American law professor and academic
- Dan J. Marlowe, American novelist
- Dan Marney (born 1981), English footballer
- Dan Marohl (born 1978), American lacrosse player
- Dan Marouelli (born 1955), Canadian ice hockey official
- Dan Marvin (born 1952), American racing driver
- Dan Maskell (1908–1992), British tennis player and commentator
- Dan Mason (1857–1929), American actor
- Dan Massey (1942–2013), American human rights activist
- Dan Masteller (born 1968), American baseball player
- Dan Masterson (1934–2022), American poet
- Dan Masys, American biotechnologist and academic
- Dan Matei (born 1981), Romanian footballer
- Dan Matheson, Canadian journalist
- Dan Mathunjawa (born 1970), Swazi boxer
- Dan Matovina (1957–2023), American record producer
- Dan Matrazzo (born 1959), American musician
- Dan Earl May (1952–2019), American artist
- Dan Maynes-Aminzade, American rapper
- Dan Mayo (born 1990), Israeli drummer and composer
- Dan Mazeau, American screenwriter
- Dan Mazer (born 1971), British comedy writer, director and producer
- Dan Mazier (born 1960), Canadian politician
- Dan Mazzulla (1958–2020), American basketball player
- Dan P. McAdams (born 1954), American personality psychologist
- Dan McAuliffe (1933–1999), Irish Gaelic football player
- Dan McBeath (1897–1963), New Zealand cricketer
- Dan McCafferty (1946–2022), Scottish singer and songwriter
- Dan McCarney (born 1953), American football player
- Dan McCarrell (born 1938), retired men's basketball coach
- Dan McCartan (1939–2024), Northern Irish Gaelic footballer
- Dan McCarthy, several people
- Dan McCauley (1936–2020), British businessman
- Dan McClintock (born 1977), American basketball player
- Dan McConchie, American politician
- Dan McCormack, multiple people
- Dan McCorquodale (born 1934), American politician
- Dan McCrudden (born 1955), American soccer player
- Dan McCrum, English journalist
- Dan McDaid, British comic book writer and artist
- Dan McDonnell, American college baseball coach
- Dan McDougall, British journalist
- Dan McDowell (born 1969), American radio personality
- Dan McElroy (born 1948), American politician
- Dan McFall (born 1963), American ice hockey player
- Dan McFarlan (1873–1924), American baseball player
- Dan McFarland (born 1972), English rugby player and coach
- Dan McGann (1871–1910), American baseball player
- Dan McGee (1911–1991), American baseball player
- Dan McGeehan (1885–1955), American baseball player
- Dan R. McGehee (1883–1962), American politician
- Dan McGillis (born 1972), Canadian ice hockey player
- Dan McGinn (1943–2023), American baseball player
- Dan McGirt, American author
- Dan McGrath, American television writer
- Dan McGrew (1937–2019), American football player
- Dan McGugin (1879–1936), American football player, football coach and lawyer
- Dan McGuire, American politician
- Dan McGwire (born 1967), American football player
- Dan McHale (born 1979), American college basketball coach
- Dan McIntyre, multiple people
- Dan McIvor, several people
- Dan McKeating, English rugby league footballer
- Dan McKee (born 1951), American politician
- Dan McKellar (born 1976), Australian rugby union footballer and coach
- Dan McKeon (born 1966), Nebraskan state senator
- Dan McKeown, American record producer
- Dan McLaughlin (born 1974), American sportscaster
- Dan McLaughlin (golfer) (born 1979), American photographer and golfer
- Dan McLindon (born 1940), Scottish footballer and manager
- Dan McMichael (c. 1850–1919), Irish football manager
- Dan Taulapapa McMullin (born 1957), American-Samoan artist
- Dan McNamara (born 1984), American artist and humorist
- Dan McPhail (1903–1987), Scottish footballer
- Dan McQuade (1983–2026), American writer and journalist
- Dan McQuaid (born 1960), American football player
- Dan McTeague (born 1962), Canadian politician and businessman
- Dan Medlin (born 1949), American football player
- Dan Meis (born 1961), American architect
- Dan Melville (born 1956), American football player
- Dan Mendelson, American businessman
- Dan Meredith, journalist and media activist
- Dan Meridor (born 1947), Israeli politician
- Dan Mertzlufft, American musical theatre composer and arranger
- Dan Merzel (born 1987), American baseball umpire
- Dan Meske (born 1984), American indoor volleyball player
- Dan Metelsky (born 1960), American politician
- Dan Mettlach, American football coach
- Dan Metzger (born 1993), American professional soccer player
- Dan Meuser (born 1964), American businessman and politician
- Dan Meyerstein (born 1938), Israeli president of Ariel University
- Dan Mica (born 1944), American politician
- Dan Micciche (born 1979), English football coach
- Dan Miceli (born 1970), American baseball player
- Dan Michaelson (born 1976), British musician
- Dan Michman (born 1947), Israeli historian
- Dan Middleman (born 1969), American long-distance runner
- Dan Mihăilescu (born 1945), Romanian ice hockey player
- Dan Mihalache (born 1971), Romanian politician
- Dan Milano (born 1972), American voice actor, puppeteer, writer and director
- Dan Milford (1876–1950), British trade unionist
- Dan Milisavljevic (born 1980), Canadian astronomer
- Dan Miller, several people
- Dan Millman (born 1946), American author and lecturer
- Dan Milne, British actor/director
- Dan Mindel (born 1958), South African-American cinematographer
- Dan Minnehan (1865–1929), American baseball player
- Dan Minogue (1891–1961), Australian rules footballer and coach
- Dan Minogue (politician) (1893–1983), Australian politician
- Dan Minor (1909–1982), American jazz musician
- Dan Mintz, multiple people
- Dan Miragliotta (born 1963), American mixed martial arts referee
- Dan Miron, Israeli-born American literary critic and author
- Dan Mirvish (born 1967), American filmmaker and author
- Dan Mishkin (born 1953), American writer
- Dan Mitrione (1920–1970), controversial U. S. Government official
- Dan Mizrahi (1926–2010), Romanian pianist
- Dan Mofokeng (1960–2022), South African politician
- Dan Moldea (born 1950), American journalist
- Dan Moloney, several people
- Dan Monahan (born 1955), American actor
- Dan Money (born 1976), British bobsledder
- Dan Monson (born 1961), American basketball coach
- Dan Monti (born 1982), American musician and record producer
- Dan Montsitsi (1952–2021), South African politician and former anti-apartheid activist
- Dan Monzon (1946–1996), American baseball player
- Dan Moody (Georgia politician), American politician
- Dan Moody (1893–1966), Texas politician
- Dan Mooney (born 1999), Welsh footballer
- Dan Moor (born 1990), Canadian rugby union player
- Dan Moran (1888–1948), American oil executive
- Dan Morgenstern (1929–2024), American jazz historian
- Dan K. Morhaim (born 1948), American politician, physician and author
- Dan Mori (born 1988), Israeli footballer
- Dan Moriarty, multiple people
- Dan Morogiello (born 1955), American baseball player
- Dan Morrissey (born 1993), Irish hurler
- Dan Morse (bridge) (1938–2023), American bridge player
- Dan Morse (1935–2024), American archaeologist
- Dan Mortensen (born 1968), American rodeo cowboy
- Dan Motreanu (born 1970), Romanian politician
- Dan Moul (born 1950), American politician
- Dan Mousley (born 2001), English cricketer
- Dan Moylan (1915–1992), Irish hurler
- Dan Mozena (born 1949), American diplomat
- Dan Mozes (born 1983), American football player
- Dan Mubiru (born 1976), Ugandan footballer
- Dan Muckala (born 1970), American songwriter and producer
- Dan Mugford (born 1991), English rugby union player
- Dan Muhlbauer (1958–2020), American politician
- Dan Mulcahy (1882–1953), Australian politician
- Dan Muller (1889–1976), American painter
- Dan Muller (basketball) (born 1976), American college basketball coach
- Dan Mullins (born 1978), British musician
- Dan Mulrooney (born 1988), American football coach
- Dan Munro (1887–?), Scottish footballer
- Dan Munro (rugby league) (1922–2011), Australian rugby league footballer
- Dan Muscatell (born 1960), American college basketball coach
- Dan Muse (born 1982), American ice hockey coach
- Dan Musielewicz (born 1981), American football coach
- Dan Mustapic (born 1960), New Zealand curler
- Dan Muys (born 1970), Canadian politician
- Dan Muzee, Kenyan politician

== N ==
- Dan Nainan (born 1961), American comedian
- Dan Namingha, Hopi painter and sculptor
- Dan Naturman (born 1969), American stand-up comedian
- Dan Naulty (born 1970), American baseball player
- Dan Navarro (born 1952), American singer-songwriter
- Dan Naveh (born 1960), Israeli former politician
- Dan Ndoye (born 2000), Swiss footballer
- Dan Neal (born 1949), American football player
- Dan Near (born 1980), Canadian ice hockey executive
- Dan Neculăescu, Romanian diplomat
- Dan Needles, Canadian writer
- Dan Negru (born 1971), Romanian TV shows host
- Dan Neicu (born 2002), Romanian footballer
- Dan Neidle, British tax lawyer
- Dan Nettleton, American biostatistician
- Dan Netzell (1913–2003), Swedish ski jumper
- Dan Neumeier (born 1948), American baseball player
- Dan Neville (politician) (born 1946), Irish former politician
- Dan Neville (football coach) (born 1978), English football coach
- Dan Newberry, American politician
- Dan Newhouse (born 1955), American politician
- Dan Newland (born 1949), American freelance journalist
- Dan Newlin (born 1974), American diplomat
- Dan Nguyen, several people
- Dan Nica (born 1960), Romanian engineer and politician
- Dan Nichols, American Jewish rock musician
- Dan Niculescu (1929–1999), Romanian basketball player
- Dan Nielson, multiple people
- Dan Nigro (born 1982), American record producer
- Dan Nimmer, American jazz pianist
- Dan Nistor (born 1988), Romanian footballer
- Dan Nordberg, American politician
- Dan Norman (born 1955), American baseball player
- Dan Norman (rugby league) (born 1997), Irish rugby league footballer
- Dan Nugent (1953–2001), American football player
- Dan Nurse (1874–1959), English footballer
- Dan Nutton (born 1996), Scottish rugby union player
- Dan Nwaelele (born 1984), American professional basketball player
- Dan Nwanyanwu (born 1959), Nigerian politician, businessman, and lawyer

== O ==
- Dan Oates (born 1955), American police officer
- Dan O'Bannon (1946–2009), American filmmaker
- Dan Obrist (born 1946), American racing driver
- Dan C. Ogle (1901–1990), surgeon general of the United States Air Force
- Dan Olaru (born 1996), Moldovan-Romanian archer
- Dan Olesevich (1937–1983), Canadian ice hockey player
- Dan Olofsson (born 1950), Swedish businessman
- Dan Olsen (born 1953), American computer scientist
- Dan Olsson (born 1947), Swedish businessman
- Dan Olweus (1931–2020), Swedish-Norwegian psychologist
- Dan Onodera (born 1998), Japanese baseball player
- Dan Onorato (born 1961), American politician
- Dan Onuorah Ibekwe, Nigerian jurist
- Dan Oppland (born 1984), American basketball player
- Dan Orlich (1924–2019), American football player
- Dan Orlovsky (born 1983), American football player
- Dan Ormsbee (1884–1985), American architect
- Dan Orsi (born 1992), Scottish footballer
- Dan Osborn (born 1975), American labor union leader activist
- Dan Osborn (baseball) (born 1946), American baseball pitcher
- Dan Osinski (1933–2013), American baseball player
- Dan Osman (1963–1998), American rock climber
- Dan Osman (Kansas politician), American politician
- Dan Oster (born 1981), American actor and comedian
- Dan Ostermiller (born 1956), American sculptor
- Dan Otero (born 1985), American baseball pitcher
- Dan O'Toole (born 1975), Canadian TV sports anchor
- Dan Otte, American entomologist
- Dan Ouseley (born 1979), British rower
- Dan Owens (born 1967), American football player
- Dan Ownby (born 1968), World Scout Committee member
- Dan Owusu, Ghanaian footballer and manager
- Dan Ožvolda (born 1996), Czech footballer

== P ==
- Dan Pabon (born 1977), American lawyer and politician
- Dan Padover, American basketball executive
- Dan Page (1930–1995), American football player
- Dan Pagis (1930–1986), Israeli poet and lecturer
- Dan Paladin (born 1979), American video game developer
- Dan Palami (born 1970), Filipino businessman and sports executive
- Dan Pallotta (born 1961), American entrepreneur, author and humanitarian activist
- Dan Păltinișanu (1951–1995), Romanian footballer
- Dan Panait (born 1997), Romanian footballer
- Dan Panic, American drummer
- Dan Panosian, American comic book artist
- Dan James Pantone, American ecologist
- Dan Papirany (born 1967), Israeli musical artist
- Dan Pardus (born 1963), American racing driver
- Dan Parent (born 1964), American comic book artist
- Dan Paris (born 1973), Australian actor and photographer
- Dan Park (born 1968), Swedish street artist
- Dan Parkinson, multiple people
- Dan Parks (born 1978), Scottish rugby union footballer and coach
- Dan Parrish (born 1983), American football player
- Dan Parry, British mix/recording engineer
- Dan Parsons (born 1966), American comic book artist
- Dan Partridge, English actor
- Dan Pascoe (born 1983), Australian cricketer
- Dan Pashman (born 1977), American podcast host and author
- Dan Pasqua (born 1961), American baseball player
- Dan Pastorini (born 1949), American football player
- Dan Patlak (born 1962), American politician
- Dan Patlansky (born 1981), South African blues guitarist, singer and songwriter
- Dan Patrick (multiple people)
- Dan W. Patton (1885–1963), American politician
- Dan Paul (1924–2010), American lawyer
- Dan Paymar (c. 1936–2020), American video poker expert
- Dan Payne, several people
- Dan Pearson (born 1964), English garden designer
- Dan Pedersen, American naval aviator
- Dan Pedoe, multiple people
- Dan Peek (1950–2011), American musician
- Dan Peer, Israeli researcher
- Dan Peiffer (born 1951), American football player
- Dan Pellegrini (born 1945), American lawyer
- Dan Pelson, American media and experimental-entertainment executive
- Dan Peltier (born 1968), American baseball player
- Dan Pembroke (born 1991), British Paralympic athlete
- Dan Pender (1873–1968), Australian rules footballer
- Dan Penn (born 1941), American soul songwriter
- Dan Penno (1861–1924), American baseball player
- Dan Pepicelli (born 1967), American baseball coach and former outfielder
- Dan Peppe, British record producer
- Dan Perciun (born 1991), Moldovan politician
- Dan Peres (born 1971), American magazine editor
- Dan Perjovschi (born 1961), Romanian artist, writer and cartoonist
- Dan Perkins (born 1975), American baseball player
- Dan Perrault, American screenwriter
- Dan Perri (born 1945), American title sequence designer
- Dan Perrin (born 1983), New Zealand rugby union coach
- Dan Persa (born 1988), American football player
- Dan Peterman (born 1960), American artist
- Dan Peters (basketball) (1954–2014), American basketball coach
- Dan Peters (born 1967), American drummer
- Dan Petrașincu (1910–1997), Italian-Romanian anthropologist
- Dan Petrescu (disambiguation), multiple people
- Dan Petronijevic (born 1981), Canadian voice actor
- Dan Petry (born 1958), American baseball player
- Dan Petryk (born 1965), Canadian curler
- Dan Pfaff (born 1954), American track and field coach
- Dan Pfister (1936–2020), American baseball player
- Dan Phelan (1861–1934), American baseball player
- Dan Philibert (born 1970), French hurdler
- Dan Piachaud (born 1937), Sri Lankan cricketer
- Dan Pickering, American politician
- Dan Pickett (musician) (1907–1967), American singer
- Dan Pickett (born 1968), American technology entrepreneur
- Dan Pienaar (1893–1942), South African Army general
- Dan Pifer (born 1972), American football player
- Dan Pike (born 2002), English association football player
- Dan Pippin (1926–1965), American basketball player
- Dan Piraro (born 1958), American painter, illustrator and cartoonist
- Dan Pirillo (born 1985), American baseball player
- Dan Pîslă (born 1986), Moldovan footballer
- Dan Pița (born 1938), Romanian film director and screenwriter
- Dan Pitcher (born 1987), American football player
- Dan Plante (born 1971), American ice hockey player
- Dan Plato (born 1960), former mayor of Cape Town
- Dan Fellows Platt (1873–1937), American art collector
- Dan Plesac (born 1962), American baseball player
- Dan du Plessis (born 1995), South African rugby union footballer
- Dan Pletch (born 1983), Canadian rugby union player
- Dan Plonsey, American musician
- Dan Pohl (born 1955), American professional golfer
- Dan Põldroos (1970–2007), Estonian actor
- Dan Policowski, American football player
- Dan Polster (born 1951), American judge
- Dan Ponce (born 1976), American television journalist
- Dan Poncet, French painter
- Dan Ponder Jr. (born 1954), American politician
- Dan Pontefract, Canadian businessman and writer
- Dan Pope (born 1963), American politician
- Dan Popik (born 1979), American soccer player and coach
- Dan Porat, Israeli historian and author
- Dan Potash (born 1970), American TV sportscaster
- Dan Potocianu (born 1974), Romanian footballer
- Dan Potra (born 1979), Romanian artistic gymnast
- Dan Poulin (1957–2015), Canadian ice hockey player
- Dan Poulter (born 1978), British politician
- Dan Povenmire (born 1963), American animator
- Dan Power (born 1983), American rugby union footballer
- Dan Poynter (1938–2015), American author
- Dan du Preez (born 1995), South African rugby union player
- Dan Press (1949–2015), American racing driver
- Dan Prestup (born 1984), American drummer, percussionist and drum instructor
- Dan Proft (born 1972), American journalist
- Dan Pryor (born 1988), New Zealand rugby union player
- Dan Pugach (born 1983), American jazz drummer
- Dan Pulcrano, American journalist
- Dan Purdie (born 1973), Australian politician
- Dan Puric (born 1959), Romanian actor, theatre director, pantomime artist and political activist
- Dan Pușcaș (born 2001), Moldovan footballer
- Dan Pybus (born 1997), English footballer
- Dan Pyle (born 1954), American painter

== Q ==
- Dan Quart (born 1972), American politician
- Dan Quayle (born 1947), American retired politician and U. S. Army veteran
- Dan Quick (born 1957), American politician
- Dan Quine, British computer scientist
- Dan Quinlan (1863–1940), American actor and vaudeville and minstrel show performer
- Dan Quirke, Irish Gaelic footballer and hurler
- Dan Quisenberry (1953–1998), American baseball player

== R ==
- Dan Racoțea (born 1995), Romanian handball player
- Dan Radakovich (American football) (1935–2020), American football player
- Dan Radakovich (born 1958), American football player
- Dan Radison (born 1950), American baseball player
- Dan Radlauer (born 1957), American film and television composer
- Dan Rafael (born 1970), American sportswriter
- Dan Rahmel (born 1972), American author
- Dan Rains (born 1956), American football player
- Dan Rambo, American football scout
- Dan Rapoport (1968–2022), Latvian-born American investor and financial executive
- Dan Rasmussen (born 1947), American politician
- Dan Raspler, writer
- Dan Rather (born 1931), American journalist and news anchor
- Dan Rattiner (born 1939), American journalist and newspaper publisher
- Dan Ratushny (born 1970), Canadian ice hockey player
- Dan Raudabaugh (born 1987), American football player
- Dan Raulerson (born 1957), American politician
- Dan Ravenhill, Irish hurler
- Dan Raviv (born 1954), American journalist
- Dan Rayfield (born 1979), American politician
- Dan Rebellato, English dramatist and academic
- Dan Redfern (born 1990), English cricketer
- Dan Redican, Canadian comedian
- Dan Reeder (musician), American musician
- Dan Reeder (born 1961), American football player
- Dan Reese, multiple people
- Dan Reich, American entrepreneur
- Dan W. Reicher, American lawyer
- Dan Reichert (born 1976), American baseball player
- Dan Reid (born 1944), Canadian politician
- Dan Reisinger (1934–2019), Israeli artist and graphic designer
- Dan Reisner, Israeli sculptor
- Dan Reiter (born 1967), American political scientist
- Dan Reitz (born 1954), American politician
- Dan Remmes (born 1966), American writer and actor
- Dan Remsberg (born 1962), American football player
- Dan Reneau (born 1940), American university president
- Dan Renouf (born 1994), Canadian ice hockey player
- Dan Repacholi (born 1982), Australian sport shooter
- Dan Resin (1931–2010), American actor
- Dan Rhodes, English writer
- Dan Riccio, American engineer and executive
- Dan Rice (1823–1900), American entertainer
- Dan Rice (American football) (born 1963), American football player
- Dan Richardson (born 1996), English rugby union player
- Dan Riddiford (1914–1974), New Zealand politician
- Dan Riisnes (born 1965), Norwegian footballer
- Dan Ripley (born 1953), American pole vaulter
- Dan Riss (1910–1970), American actor
- Dan Rivers (born 1973), English news correspondent
- Dan C. Rizzie (born 1951), American painter
- Dan Roan (born 1976), British journalist
- Dan Robinson, several people
- Dan Robison, American poker and gin player
- Dan Robson (born 1992), English rugby union footballer
- Dan Roche, American sports broadcaster
- Dan Rockhill, American architect
- Dan Roden, American medical researcher
- Dan Rogas (1926–2018), American football player
- Dan Rogerson (born 1975), Cornish-British politician
- Dan Rohlfing (born 1989), American baseball player
- Dan Rohn (born 1956), American baseball player
- Dan Rohrmeier (born 1965), American baseball player
- Dan Roman, several people
- Dan Romer (born 1983), American record producer
- Dan Romik, mathematician
- Dan Ronan (born 1975), Australian volleyball player
- Dan Roodt (born 1957), South African author, publisher and commentator
- Dan M. Rooney (1932–2017), American football executive
- Dan Rosado (born 1959), American football player
- Dan Rosen (born 1963), American screenwriter and director
- Dan Rosenfield (born 1977), British political advisor and civil servant
- Dan Rosensweig, American business executive
- Dan Rosescu (1944–2004), Romanian-American professional handball player and coach
- Dan Rosewarne (born 1981), New Zealand politician
- Dan Rossignol, American family medicine doctor
- Dan Rostenkowski (1928–2010), American politician
- Dan Rothem (born 1976), Israeli baseball player
- Dan Rotman, American bridge player
- Dan Rottenberg (born 1942), American author and editor
- Dan Roundfield (1953–2012), American basketball player
- Dan Roushar (born 1960), American football coach
- Dan Rowan (1922–1987), American actor
- Dan Roycroft (born 1978), Canadian cross-country skier
- Dan Ruby (born 1964), American politician
- Dan Rudin, American record producer
- Dan Ruimy, Canadian politician
- Dan Ruland (born 1960), American basketball player
- Dan Runge (born 1961), Canadian football player
- Dan Runte, American monster truck driver
- Dan Runzler (born 1985), American baseball player
- Dan Rusanowsky (born 1960), American sports broadcaster
- Dan Rush (born 1960), American union organizer
- Dan Rutherford (born 1955), American politician
- Dan Růžička (born 1991), Czech ice hockey player
- Dan Ryckert (born 1984), American journalist
- Dan Ryczek (born 1949), American football player

== S ==
- Dan Saban, American former police chief
- Dan Sabbagh (born 1971), British journalist
- Dan Saddler, American politician
- Dan Sahlin (born 1967), Swedish former professional footballer
- Dan Saleaumua (born 1964), American football player
- Dan Sales (1958–2005), American film producer
- Dan Sallitt (born 1955), American filmmaker and film critic
- Dan Salvato, American indie video game developer
- Dan Salvemini (born 1957), American soccer player
- Dan Samuel, 4th Viscount Samuel (1925–2014), British-Israeli businessman and peer
- Dan Sandifer (1927–1987), American football player
- Dan Săndulescu (born 1985), Romanian footballer
- Dan Sane (1896–1956), American songwriter
- Dan Santat, American children's illustrator
- Dan Santucci (born 1983), American football player
- Dan Sarginson (born 1993), Australian-English rugby league footballer
- Dan Sarooshi, British legal scholar
- Dan Sartain (1981–2021), American musician
- Dan Sartin (born 1946), American football player
- Dan Sassi (born 2003), English footballer
- Dan Satterberg (born 1960), American lawyer
- Dan J. Savage (1890–1931), American sports coach
- Dan Savage (born 1964), American sex columnist
- Dan Scanlon (born 1976), American filmmaker
- Dan Scarbrough (born 1978), English rugby union footballer
- Dan Scarr (born 1994), English footballer
- Dan Scavino (born 1976), American political advisor
- Dan Schachte (1958–2022), American ice hockey official
- Dan Schatzeder (born 1954), American baseball player
- Dan Schlissel (born 1970), American record label owner and producer
- Dan Schmid (born 1962), American musician
- Dan Schneider (disambiguation), multiple people
- Dan Schnurrenberger (born 1955), American canoeist
- Dan Schoen (born 1974), American politician
- Dan Schommer, American boxer
- Dan Schooff (born 1971), American politician
- Dan Schottel (born 1935), American politician
- Dan Moses Schreier, American composer and sound designer
- Dan Schutte (born 1947), American Christian singer
- Dan Schwartz (born 1950), American politician
- Dan Scripps, American politician and public official
- Dan Scullion (1886–1949), Australian rules footballer
- Dan Seals (1948–2009), American musician
- Dan Sefton, British screenwriter
- Dan Segal (born 1947), British mathematician
- Dan Seguin (born 1948), Canadian ice hockey player
- Dan T. Sehlberg, Swedish writer
- Dan Selbo (born 1955), American Lutheran bishop
- Dan Gillespie Sells (born 1978), English musician
- Dan Senor (born 1971), American writer
- Dan Serafini (born 1974), American baseball player
- Dan Serfaty (born 1966), French entrepreneur and businessman
- Dan Seum (born 1940), American politician
- Dan Severn (born 1958), American wrestler
- Dan Severson (born 1954), American politician
- Dan Sexton (born 1987), American ice hockey player
- Dan Shak (born 1959), American poker player and businessman
- Dan Shamir (born 1975), Israeli basketball coach
- Dan Shanahan (born 1977), Irish hurler
- Dan Shannon (1865–1913), American baseball player
- Dan Shanoff, American sportswriter
- Dan Shapira, American physicist
- Dan Shaughnessy (athlete) (born 1944), Canadian long-distance runner
- Dan Shaughnessy (born 1953), American sports writer
- Dan Shaul (born 1968), American politician
- Dan Shaver (1950–2007), American racing driver
- Dan Shaw, Canadian football player
- Dan Shea, multiple people
- Dan Sheahan, American baseball player
- Dan Shechtman (born 1941), Israeli scientist
- Dan Sheridan (1916–1963), American actor
- Dan Shermerhorn (born 1973), Canadian ice hockey player
- Dan Sherry, Canadian boxer
- Dan Shevchik (born 1980), American swimmer
- Dan B. Shields (1878–1970), American politician
- Dan Shilon (born 1940), Israeli journalist, announcer and TV presenter
- Dan Shingles (born 1986), British field hockey player
- Dan Shipp, American educator and President of Maryville University
- Dan Shomron (1937–2008), Israeli Chief of Staff
- Dan Shor (born 1956), American actor, director and writer
- Dan Shore, American classical composer
- Dan Shorey (born 1938), British motorcycle racer
- Dan Shugar, American business executive and renewable energy pioneer
- Dan Shulman (born 1967), Canadian sportscaster
- Dan Sickles, multiple people
- Dan Siegel, multiple people
- Dan Siegler, American composer
- Dan Signer, Canadian-American television producer
- Dan Sikes (1929–1987), American professional golfer
- Dan Sileo (born 1964), American football player
- Dan Simion (born 1958), Romanian triple jumper
- Dan Simkovitch (1954–2020), French actress
- Dan Simonds (born 1965), American baseball coach
- Dan Simoneau (born 1959), American cross-country skier
- Dan Simonescu (1902–1993), Romanian historian
- Dan Simrell (born 1943), American football player
- Dan Single, Australian fashion designer
- Dan Sîrbu (born 2003), Romanian footballer
- Dan Skattum, American politician
- Dan Skelton, British racehorse trainer
- Dan Renton Skinner (born 1973), English actor
- Dan Skipper (born 1994), American football player
- Dan Skirka (born 1985), American college baseball coach
- Dan Skogen (born 1957), American politician
- Dan Skuta (born 1986), American football player
- Dan Slane (1942–2020), American businessman
- Dan Slania (born 1992), American baseball player
- Dan Slater (born 1976), New Zealand sailor
- Dan Sleigh (1938–2023), South African novelist
- Dan Slobin (born 1939), American linguist
- Dan Slott (born 1967), American comic book writer
- Dan Slușanschi (1943–2008), Romanian classicist
- Dan Smith, several people
- Dan Smoot (1913–2003), FBI agent; conservative political activist
- Dan Snaith (born 1978), Canadian musician
- Dan Snarr (born 1949), American politician
- Dan Snee (born 1984), New Zealand rugby union player
- Dan Snow (born 1978), British television presenter
- Dan Soder (born 1983), American comedian
- Dan Sonney (1915–2002), American film director
- Dan Soper, New Zealand rugby union coach
- Dan Sosa Jr. (1924–2016), justice of the New Mexico Supreme Court
- Dan Soucek (born 1969), American politician
- Dan Șova (born 1973), Romanian lawyer and politician
- Dan Spang (born 1983), American-Italian ice hockey player
- Dan Spătaru (footballer) (born 1994), Moldovan footballer
- Dan Spătaru (1939–2004), Romanian singer
- Dan Spence (born 1989), English footballer
- Dan Sperber (born 1942), French academic
- Dan Spiegle (1920–2017), American comics artist and cartoonist
- Dan Spielman, Australian actor
- Dan Spillner (born 1951), American baseball player
- Dan Spitz (born 1963), American guitarist
- Dan Spivey (born 1952), American professional wrestler
- Dan Spring (ice hockey) (born 1951), Canadian ice hockey player
- Dan Spring (1910–1988), Irish politician
- Dan Sserunkuma (born 1983), Ugandan footballer
- Dan Stacy, American politician
- Dan Stains (born 1964), Australian rugby league footballer and coach
- Dan Staley (born 1963), American screenwriter
- Dan Stanca (born 1955), Romanian writer
- Dan Stanley, American football coach
- Dan Stannard (1937–2023), Zimbabwean policeman
- Dan Stauber, American ice hockey player
- Dan Stav (born 1956), Israeli diplomat
- Dan Stearns (1861–1944), American baseball player
- Dan Stec (born 1969), American politician
- Dan Steele (born 1969), American bobsledder and track and field competitor
- Dan Steffan, American cartoonist and writer
- Dan V. Stephens (1868–1939), American politician
- Dan Sterling, American screenwriter and television producer
- Dan Sterup-Hansen (1918–1995), Danish painter and illustrator
- Dan Stevenson (politician) (born 1959), American politician
- Dan Stevenson (born 1982), American football player
- Dan Stiles, American designer
- Dan Stoenescu (born 1980), Romanian career diplomat, political scientist and journalist
- Dan Stone, multiple people
- Dan Stoneking (1942–2007), American sports journalist
- Dan Storper (1951–2025), American businessman
- Dan Straily (born 1988), American baseball player
- Dan Stratford (born 1985), English footballer
- Dan Strauss (born 1986), American politician
- Dan Stroup (born 1968), Canadian lacrosse player
- Dan Strugnell (born 1992), English footballer
- Dan Stryzinski (born 1965), American football player
- Dan Stuart (born 1961), American musician
- Dan Studney (born 1941), American former track and field athlete
- Dan Stulbach (born 1969), Brazilian actor
- Dan Sudick, visual effects supervisor
- Dan Suleiman (1942–2023), Nigerian politician
- Dan Sultan (born 1983), Australian singer
- Dan Keun Sung (born 1952), South Korean electrical engineer
- Dan A. Surra (born 1953), American politician
- Dan Suter (born 1993), Welsh rugby union player
- Dan Sutton (born 1970), American politician
- Dan Swanö (born 1973), Swedish musician
- Dan Swanstrom (born c. 1982), American football coach
- Dan Swartz (1934–1997), American basketball player
- Dan Swecker (1947–2021), American politician
- Dan Sweeney, multiple people
- Dan Swimer, television writer and producer
- Dan Szymborski (born 1978), American writer

== T ==
- Dan Taberski, American writer, director and producer
- Dan Talevski (born 1987), Canadian singer-songwriter
- Dan Tălmaciu (born 2002), Romanian footballer
- Dan Tamura (born 1999), Japanese professional wrestler
- Dan Tan (born 1964), Singaporean businessman
- Dan Tana (1935–2025), Serbian-American restaurateur, actor, football executive, and footballer
- Dan Tanasă (born 1981), Romanian politician
- Dan Tangherlini (born 1967), American civil servant
- Dan Tangnes (born 1979), Norwegian ice hockey player
- Dan Taras (born 1994), Moldovan footballer
- Dan Tawfik (1955–2021), Israeli biochemist
- Dan Teefey (1923–1976), American politician
- Dan Tehan (born 1968), Australian politician
- Dan Tepfer (born 1982), French-American jazz pianist
- Dan Teran, American businessman
- Dan Terry (1924–2011), American big band leader, arranger, trumpet and flugelhorn player
- Dan Tessier (born 1979), Canadian ice hockey player
- Dan Tetsell (born 1974), English comedian
- Dan Theodorescu, American physician and academic
- Dan Thiessen (1946–2014), American football player
- Dan Thiessen (politician) (1922–2012), American politician
- Dan J. Thoma (born 1963), American metallurgist
- Dan Thomassen (born 1981), Danish footballer
- Dan Thurlow, American politician
- Dan Tichon (1937–2024), Israeli politician
- Dan Ticktum (born 1999), British racing driver
- Dan Tieman (1940–2012), American basketball player
- Dan Tiernan (fl. 2020 - ), English stand-up comedian
- Dan Tillberg (born 1953), Swedish artist and producer
- Dan Tipple (1890–1960), American baseball player
- Dan Tipton (c. 1844–1898), American miner and gambler
- Dan Tobin (1910–1982), American actor
- Dan Ťok (born 1959), Czech politician and business manager
- Dan Toler (1948–2013), American guitarist
- Dan Tolkowsky (1921–2025), Israeli Air Force major general
- Dan Tomasulo (born 1951), American psychologist
- Dan Tomlinson (born 1992), British politician
- Dan R. Tonkovich (1946–2002), American politician
- Dan Toomey, American politician
- Dan Topolinschi (born 1966), Romanian footballer
- Dan Topping (1912–1974), American baseball executive
- Dan Torten (born 1964), Israeli sailor
- Dan Totheroh (1894–1976), American dramatist
- Dan Touhig (born 1947), British politician
- Dan Towler (1928–2001), American football player
- Dan Towriss (born 1972), American businessman
- Dan Trachtenberg (born 1981), American filmmaker and podcast host
- Dan Trant (1961–2001), American basketball player
- Dan Travers (born 1956), Scottish badminton player
- Dan Trebil (born 1974), American ice hockey player
- Dan Tremelling (1897–1970), English footballer
- Dan Troy (hurler) (c. 1897–1953), Irish hurler
- Dan Troy (born 1948), American politician
- Dan Truitt, American politician
- Đan Trường (born 1976), Vietnamese male singer and actor
- Dan Tsalka (1936–2005), Polish-born Israeli writer
- Dan Tshanda (1964–2019), South African music producer
- Dan Tudin (born 1978), Canadian-born Italian ice hockey player
- Dan Tuffy, Australian-born musician
- Dan Tullis Jr. (born 1951), American actor
- Dan Tulpan (born 1957), Romanian footballer
- Dan Tuohy (born 1985), English-Irish rugby union footballer
- Dan Turèll (1946–1993), Danish writer
- Dan Turk (1962–2000), American football player
- Dan Turner, several people
- Dan Twardzik (born 1991), German footballer
- Dan Tye (1899–1965), American baseball player
- Dan Tyler (born 1950), American songwriter
- Dan Tyminski (born 1967), American bluegrass musician
- Dan Tynan, American journalist and commentator

== U ==
- Dan Uddenfeldt (born 1951), Swedish chess player
- Dan Udy (1874–1935), New Zealand rugby union player
- Dan Ugaste (born 1963), American politician
- Dan Uggla (born 1980), American baseball player
- Dan Peter Ulvestad (born 1989), Norwegian footballer
- Dan Upperco (born 1963), American football player

== V ==
- Dan Vadis (1938–1987), American actor
- Dan Vado (born 1959), American comic book publisher
- Dan Van Dyk (1942–2004), American politician
- Dan Vandal (born 1960), Canadian politician
- Dan Vapid (born 1970), American musician
- Dan Vassallo (born 1985), American distance runner
- Dan Veatch (born 1965), American Olympic swimmer
- Dan Vebber (born 1970), American writer
- Dan Ventrelle, American businessman
- Dan Vera, American poet and editor
- Dan Verssen, American war game designer
- Dan Vickerman (1979–2017), Australian rugby player
- Dan Vickrey (born 1966), American musician
- Dan Villa (born 1983), American politician
- Dan Villari (born 2002), American football player
- Dan Villegas (born 1980), Filipino cinematographer
- Dan Vincelette (born 1967), Canadian ice hockey player
- Dan Vitale, American comedian
- Dan Vlad (born 1983), Romanian rugby union player
- Dan Vogel, American writer
- Dan Voiculescu (1946–2024), Romanian politician and businessman
- Dan Vollmer, American politician
- Dan Vyleta (born 1974), German-Canadian writer

== W ==
- Dan Waenga (born 1985), New Zealand rugby union player
- Dan Waern (born 1933), Swedish middle-distance runner
- Dan Wagaluka (born 1986), Ugandan footballer
- Dan Wagoner (1959–1997), American football player
- Dan Wakefield (1932–2024), American novelist, journalist and screenwriter
- Dan Wakeford (born 1975), English-born American journalist
- Dan Wakeham (born 1981), British snowboarder
- Dan Walker, multiple people
- Dan Wall, American jazz musician
- Dan Wallin (1927–2024), American sound engineer
- Dan Walls (1942–1999), New Zealand physicist
- Dan Ward-Smith (born 1978), New Zealand rugby union player
- Dan Warthen (born 1952), American baseball player and coach
- Dan Wasserman, American political cartoonist
- Dan Watchurst (born 1990), Welsh rugby union player
- Dan Watermeier (born 1961), American politician
- Dan Watters, English comic book writer
- Dan Way (born 1987), English rugby union player
- Dan Weggeland (1827–1918), Norwegian-born American painter
- Dan Weinberg, American politician
- Dan Weiner (1919–1959), American photojournalist
- Dan Weinstein, multiple people
- Dan Weisse, American college basketball coach
- Dan Welcher (born 1948), American classical composer
- Dan Weller (born 1980), English record producer, audio mixer, songwriter and guitarist
- Dan Wen (born 1999), Chinese field hockey player
- Dan Werb, Canadian epidemiologist and former musician
- Dan Werner (born 1987), American professional basketball player
- Dan Westover (born 1974), American biathlete
- Dan Whalen (born 1988), American football player
- Dan Whannell (1899–1929), Australian rules footballer
- Dan Wheeldon (born 1989), English cricketer
- Dan Wheeler (born 1977), American baseball player
- Dan Whelchel (1894–1988), American football player
- Dan Wheldon (1978–2011), British racing driver
- Daniel Wherrett, stage name DJ Dan, American DJ
- Dan Whitehouse (born 1978), English songwriter and musician
- Dan Whitehurst (born 1948), American lawyer
- Dan Whitmer (born 1955), American baseball player
- Dan Wickenden (1913–1989), American author
- Dan Wickline (born 1970), American novelist
- Dan Wicklum (born 1965), Canadian politician
- Daniel Widdowson (born 1980), Australian radio, theatre, television and film actor, artistic writer and director
- Dan Wieden (1945–2022), American advertising executive
- Dan Wikler (born 1946), American philosopher
- Dan Wilcox (1941–2024), American producer and screenwriter
- Dan Wilde (born 1984), English singer-songwriter
- Dan Wilkinson (born 1973), American football player
- Dan Willard (1948–2023), American computer scientist
- Dan William (1946–2008), American physician
- Dan Willis, multiple people
- Dan Winning (born 1997), Scottish rugby union player
- Dan Winters (born 1962), American portrait photographer
- Dan Wishart (born 1992), English footballer
- Dan Witz (born 1957), American painter
- Dan Wodicka (born c. 1991), American football coach
- Dan Wolgamott (born 1990), American politician
- Dan Wolman (born 1941), Israeli filmmaker and lecturer
- Dan Woodards (1886–1964), English footballer
- Dan Woodgate (born 1960), English musician, songwriter, composer and record producer
- Dan Woodley (born 1967), American ice hockey player
- Dan Woodman (1893–1962), American baseball player
- Dan Woog (writer) (born 1953), American writer and soccer player
- Dan Woog, American real estate agent and politician
- Dan Wool, American composer
- Dan Wootton (born 1983), New Zealand journalist
- Dan Woren (born 1952), American voice actor
- Dan Wyman, American musician, educator and composer
- Dan Wynn, American photographer

== Y ==
- Dan H. Yaalon (1924–2014), Israeli pedologist and soil scientist
- Dan Yaccarino (born 1965), American author, illustrator and television producer
- Dan Yakir (born 1953), Israeli ecophysiologist
- Dan D. Yang (born 1965), Chinese optical physicist
- Dan Yashinsky, Canadian storyteller
- Dan Yeager (born 1965), American actor
- Dan Kwaku Yeboah (born 1975), Ghanaian journalist
- Dan Yessian (born 1944), American musician
- Dan Yochum (1950–2020), American gridiron football player
- Dan York, Scottish rugby union player
- Dan Young (1899–1970), British comedian

== Z ==
- Dan Zahavi (born 1967), Danish philosopher
- Dan Zakhem (1958–1994), Israeli performance artist
- Dan Zanes (born 1961), American musician
- Dan Zaneski (1945–2015), American football player and coach
- Dan Zeff (born 1953), British TV director & writer
- Dan Zehr (1916–2001), American swimmer
- Dan Zerfaß (born 1968), German classical organist
- Dan Zetterström (born 1954), Swedish ornithologist and bird artist
- Dan Zhang (academic) (born 1978), Chinese-American operations researcher
- Dan Zhaoyi (born 1940), Chinese pianist
- Dan Zimmerman (born 1974), American film editor
- Dan Zimmerman (politician) (born 1965), American politician
- Dan Zimmermann (born 1966), German rock drummer
- Dan Ziskie (1944–2025), American actor
- Dan Zoler (born 1974), Israeli chess Grandmaster and doctor
- Dan Zoreka, Ugandan Anglican bishop
- Dan Zumbach (born 1960), American politician and farmer
- Dan Zwonitzer (born 1979), American politician
- Dan van Zyl (born 1971), South African sportsman

== Fictional characters ==
- Dan Dare, a British science fiction comic hero
- Desperate Dan, a regular in The Dandy since 1937
- Dan Cahill, in The 39 Clues
- Dan Egan, in Veep
- Dan Hibiki, in the Street Fighter Alpha series
- Dan Humphrey, in Gossip Girl
- Dan Kuso, from the Bakugan: Battle Brawlers anime series
- Dan Lewis (Doctor Who), in Doctor Who
- Dan Sullivan, in EastEnders
- Dan Vaapit, a character in Ninjago

== See also ==
- List of people with given name Daniel
- Danny, given name
- Dans, given name and surname
