= Dan Moloney =

Dan Moloney may refer to:

- Dan Moloney (footballer)
- Dan Moloney (wrestler)

== See also ==
- Daniel Moloney, Irish politician
