= Dan Patrick =

Dan Patrick may refer to:

- Dan Patrick (ice hockey) (born 1938), Canadian ice hockey player
- Dan Patrick (politician) (born 1950), Lieutenant Governor of Texas and political and sports radio journalist
- Dan Patrick (sportscaster) (born 1956), American sportscaster and radio personality
- Danny Patrick (politician) (1941–2009), American politician

== See also ==
- Danica Patrick (born 1982), American race car driver
- Dan-Patrick Poggenberg (born 1992), German footballer
