= Dan Willis =

Dan Willis may refer to:

- Dan Willis (author) (born 1967), American fantasy and science-fiction author
- Dan Willis (comedian) (born 1973), British comedian based in Australia

== See also ==
- Daniel Willis (born 1954), Australian clergyman
