= Dan Patrick (ice hockey) =

Canadian ice hockey player

- Born: September 5, 1938 (age 86); Aurora, Ontario, Canada
- Height: 5 ft 10 in (178 cm)
- Weight: 175 lb (79 kg; 12 st 7 lb)
- Position: Center
- Shot: Left
- Played for: Washington Presidents; Johnstown Jets; Salem Rebels
- Playing career: 1955–1969

Daniel Patrick (born September 5, 1938) is a Canadian retired professional hockey player who played 591 games in the Eastern Hockey League with the Washington Presidents, Johnstown Jets and Salem Rebels.
