= Dan Basen =

New York Artist

Dan Murry Basen (11 April 1939 - 1 April 1970) was an American sculptor, painter, assemblage artist and performance artist. Basen is best known for his assemblages and box-based work. Dan Basen was educated at the State University of New York (BS) and the Maryland Institute of Art's Rinehart School of Sculpture (MFA). He took courses at the Brooklyn Museum School and received many awards for his work, including a Rinehart Fellowship, and the Max Beckman Scholarship of the Brooklyn Museum. Basen exhibited his work in a number of important New York City galleries during the 1960s, including Allan Stone Gallery, Betty Parsons Gallery, the Bridge Gallery, and the Chelsea Gallery. His work also showed at the San Francisco Museum of Modern Art, the Baltimore Museum of Art, and the Corcoran Gallery in Washington D.C. Basen's work is in the permanent collection of the Whitney Museum, the Wadsworth Atheneum, the Rhode Island School of Design and Colgate University.

== Life and career ==
After Basen received his Bachelor of Science in Art Education from State University of New York at New Paltz in 1961, he briefly worked as an art teacher in Cornwall, N.Y. He then pursued an MFA from the Rinehart School of Sculpture at the Maryland Institute College of Art in 1963. As a Masters student at the Maryland Institute College of Art, Basen was lauded for his sculptural works.

From 1962 to 1963 he also orchestrated a series of "Happenings", which were widely attended by the Baltimore arts community and covered local press like the Baltimore Sun.

Basen subsequently moved to New York, where he showed objet trouve and assemblage-based works at galleries like Betty Parsons, where he exhibited a number of "Tinker Toy" objects that invited viewers to "plug the holes with round sticks".

In 1963, he received a museum purchase prize from the Baltimore Museum of Art. Basen won the first prize award from the Baltimore Museum for his large sculpture, "Crucifixion".

Basen's work has been exhibited in several museum exhibitions Basen assemblage, Sardine Cans (1964), was gifted to the Whitney Museum of American Art by the Howard and Jean Lipman Foundation, Inc and showed in both the Whitney 1975 group show, "Sculpture of the 60s: selections from the permanent collection", and in the 1980 show, "American Sculpture: Gifts of the Howard and Jean Lipman Foundation".

Samuel Wagstaff supported and collected Basen, whom he also had a romantic relationship with during the 1960s. In 1962, while Samuel Wagstaff was a curator at the Wadsworth Atheneum, "he bestowed a local award" on Basen. One version of these Happenings involved Basen "calling pay phones" and, "[i]f a male passerby picked up the phone, Basen would try to engage him, sometimes successfully, in explicitly erotic conversation".

In sexologist John Money's book, "Lovemaps", Money writes that "[i]n the 1960s, Dan Basen, an art student now deceased, designed a program for a Happening. He dialed from his home at night the numbers of payphones on downtown streets in the entertainment district. His anonymous responders were men. They engaged in uninhibited and explicitly erotic conversation".

In 1965, collector Emily Hall Tremaine "was asked to put together an exhibition for the Society for the Encouragement of contemporary Art in San Francisco, to be called A New York Collector Selects", and selected, in addition to works by Pop artists like "Warhol, Lichtenstein, Rosenquist, and Oldenburg", two works by Dan Basen.

During the 1960s and until his death, Basen regularly showed with Allan Stone Gallery.

Basen "and his co-gallerist Jolie Kelter collected and exhibited" so-called "'tramp art,'" which they showed "at their West Hartford and East Village gallery, the Hobo Gallery (also known as the 'Flame Gallery' and, later, the 'Rose Gallery').

Jolie Kelter was Basen's "long-term partner."

Amongst Basen's notable artistic collaborations is Charles Henri-Ford's film, Johnny Minotaur (1971), which Basen narrated alongside Salvador Dali and Allen Ginsberg.

== Death and legacy ==
Dan Basen tried to take his life in 1965, but was unsuccessful. Basen died at the age of 30 in his home at 132 Division St., New York. A number of artists whom Basen had been associated with commemorated his passing. For instance, Basen also became close to American-Italian artist Edward Giobbi, who, following Basen's death, completed a number of works as homage to Basen, including "A Home for Danny Basen No. 7, completed in January of 1978 [....] the suicide of the young artist, Danny Basen" was a theme that profoundly affected Giobbi who remarked that "Danny was a gentle, homeless man who was just a misfit in this world. Danny represents what is sad in our society—America today is full of people with houses who are homeless".

Independent filmmaker Robin Lloyd's experimental documentary, Dan Basen (1970) shows "[t]he painter at work, shortly before his death" as Basen prepares for what would be his final solo exhibition during his lifetime, the 1969 show "Beyond Erotica: Fetish Painting" at Star Turtle Gallery. Lloyd's film featured at the Ninth Ann Arbor Film Festival March 9–14, 1971.

Following Basen's passing, Allan Stone Gallery continued showing his work in numerous shows. In 2002, artist and curator Blake Nyland assembled "Something, Anything" at Matthew Marks Gallery, which included Basen's "intricate, faux-Cubist construction Box Face, which Dan Basen built from a dresser drawer in 1969".

In September 2025, Editions Skira Paris published an art historical monograph on Dan Basen written by Ekin Erkan and featuring an introduction by Jonathan Katz.
