= Dan Weinstein =

Dan Weinstein may refer to:

- Dan Weinstein (speed skater) (born 1981), Olympic short track speedskater
- Dan Weinstein (musician), music composer, violinist, and trombonist
