= Dan Moriarty =

Dan Moriarty may refer to:

- Dan Moriarty (cricketer) (born 1999), South African cricketer
- Dan Moriarty (footballer, born 1895) (1895–1982), Australian rules footballer in the (then) South Australian Football League
- Dan Moriarty (footballer, born 1875) (1875–1903), Australian rules footballer in the Victorian Football League
