= Dan Lowe =

American real estate developer

Dan Lowe is a Kansas City based real estate developer who has developed retail projects around the country, among them the Legends Outlets Kansas City. One of the early proponents of open-air shopping malls, called lifestyle centers, Lowe and his companies have sometimes generated controversy for a reliance on public/private partnerships. Such a partnership was successful in Wyandotte County, as the public bonds for the Legends Outlets were retired ahead of schedule. Lowe is currently the CEO of Legacy Development.

In 2014 Lowe was a member of the inaugural class of the University of Missouri-Kansas City Bloch School of Business Entrepreneur Hall of Fame. Lowe is also the recipient of four liver transplants.
