= Dan Levenson =

Dan Levenson may refer to:

- Dan Levenson (musician), American old-time musician and storyteller
- Dan Levenson (artist), American artist

== See also ==
- Dan Levinson, American jazz clarinetist, saxophonist, and bandleader
