= Dan Upperco =

American football player (born 1963)

- Born: May 23, 1963 (age 63)
- Education: Columbia University; Rutgers University; Ashridge Management College
- Occupations: Corporate executive, entrepreneur
- Football career

Profile
- Position: Tight end

Career information
- High school: William R. Boone High School
- College: Columbia University

Career history
- Los Angeles Raiders (1985)

Dan Upperco (born May 23, 1963) is a former American football tight end for the Los Angeles Raiders of the National Football League. He signed as a free agent in 1985 after achieving All-Ivy League honors 3 years running at Columbia University.

== Early life ==
Three sports letterman at William R. Boone High School in Orlando, Florida playing football, basketball and competed in track and field. In basketball was first-team All-Metro Conference and in football played tight end and defensive end making the All-State team playing in the 1981 Sunshine State Game, was chosen first-team to the All-Metro Conference and All-Central Florida squads, MVP of his high school football team and school Hall of Fame.

== College career ==
Dan Upperco attended Columbia University on a full scholarship and also studied economics there. He finished his college career at Columbia with 16 touchdowns, 107 receptions, 1,587 receiving yards averaging over 35 catches and over 500 yards during each of his three varsity years; setting a number of Columbia records and at one time held the Ivy League record of catches in a single game with 13. He made the All-Ivy League teams every year during his varsity career (1st team his junior & senior year, Honorable Mention sophomore year). He was Sporting News Preseason All-American and made the Playboy 's Pigskin Preview Issue All-East team. Dan was chosen as team MVP his senior year winning the prestigious “Smythe Cup” with Columbia's football tradition being the 3rd longest in the nation playing the 2nd collegiate football game in 1870.

== Professional sports career ==
Upperco signed with the Los Angeles Raiders franchise of the National Football League. He played during the pre-season and had a knee injury against the Dallas Cowboys sidelining him for the rest of the 1985 season. served and is currently a five-term Officer (Vice President, Treasurer and Secretary) for the National Football League Retired Players Association, New York/New Jersey Chapter.

== Education ==
- B.A. in economics - Columbia University (Dean's List, Class Marshall)
- M.B.A. in finance - Rutgers University
- Executive M.B.A. from the Ashridge Management College in Berkhamsted, England.
