= Dan Kemp =

Dan Kemp may refer to:

- Dan Kemp (footballer), English footballer
- John Dan Kemp, American lawyer
- Daniel S. Kemp, American organic chemist
