= Dan Mackay =

Scottish cricketer and soldier

Personal information
- Full name: Daniel Alexander Mackay
- Born: 12 March 1894; Glasgow, Lanarkshire, Scotland
- Died: 13 May 1951 (aged 57); Glasgow, Lanarkshire, Scotland
- Batting: Right-handed
- Bowling: Right-arm medium

Domestic team information
- Years: Team
- 1923–1930: Scotland

Career statistics
| Competition | First-class |
|---|---|
| Matches | 8 |
| Runs scored | 203 |
| Batting average | 14.50 |
| 100s/50s | –/1 |
| Top score | 68 |
| Balls bowled | 90 |
| Wickets | 3 |
| Bowling average | 13.33 |
| 5 wickets in innings | – |
| 10 wickets in match | – |
| Best bowling | 3/35 |
| Catches/stumpings | 2/– |
- Source: Cricinfo, 24 June 2022

Daniel Alexander Mackay (12 March 1894 — 13 May 1951) was a Scottish first-class cricketer and British Army officer.

Mackay was born at Glasgow, the eldest son of James King Mackay, in March 1894 and was educated in the city at Albert Road Academy. Mackay served in the First World War, being commissioned in June 1915 as a second lieutenant in the 16th Battalion (2nd Glasgow) Highland Light Infantry. The 16th Battalion departed for the Western Front in November 1915, arriving at Boulogne-sur-Mer as part of the 97th Brigade in the 32nd Division, with the battalion later taking part in the Battle of the Ancre, the last offensive of the Battle of the Somme. In the later stages of the war, Mackay had transferred to the Royal Engineers, where he was a lieutenant.

Following the end of the war, Mackay returned to Scotland where he played club cricket for Clydesdale Cricket Club. He made his debut for Scotland in first-class cricket against Ireland at Dublin in 1923, with Mackay making a further seven first-class appearances for Scotland to 1930. He scored 203 runs in these matches at an average of 14.50; he made one score of over fifty, 68 which came against Ireland on debut. With his right-arm medium pace bowling, he took 3 wickets, all of which came in a single innings against Wales in 1923. Mackay died at Glasgow in May 1951.
