= Dan Reese =

Daniel or Dan Reese may refer to the following New Zealanders:

- Dan Reese (politician) (1841–1891), builder and MP
- Dan Reese (cricketer) (1879–1953), son of the MP
- Daniel Reese (cricketer) (1898–1954)
