= Dan Long =

Dan or Danny Long may refer to:

- Dan Long (producer), American music producer, recording engineer, and mixer
- Dan Long (baseball) (1867–1929), outfielder in Major League Baseball
- Daniel E. Long Jr., United States Army general
- Danny Long (footballer), see 2012 FAI Cup
- Danny Long (boxer), see Robbie Sims
