= Dan Reisner =

Israeli sculptor

- דן רייזנר
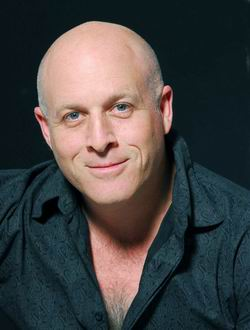
- Born: 1964 (age 61–62)
- Education: Master of Fine Arts; Bezalel Academy of Arts and Design
- Occupations: Sculptor, sculpture teacher
- Known for: urban and public sculptures
- Website: danreisner.com

Dan Reisner (Hebrew: דן רייזנר; born 1964) is an Israeli sculptor and sculpture teacher.

== Early years and education ==
Dan Reisner was born in Haifa and grew up in Ramat HaSharon. From 1983 to 1986, Reisner served as a war doctor in a paratrooper unit, among others in Lebanon. As a result of his service, Reisner suffered from post-traumatic stress disorder.

Later, Reisner studied art at HaMidrasha Faculty of Arts, Ramat Hasharon, where he graduated with a teaching certificate in 1991. He obtained a Master of Fine Arts from Bezalel Academy of Arts and Design, Jerusalem, in 2000.

== Career ==
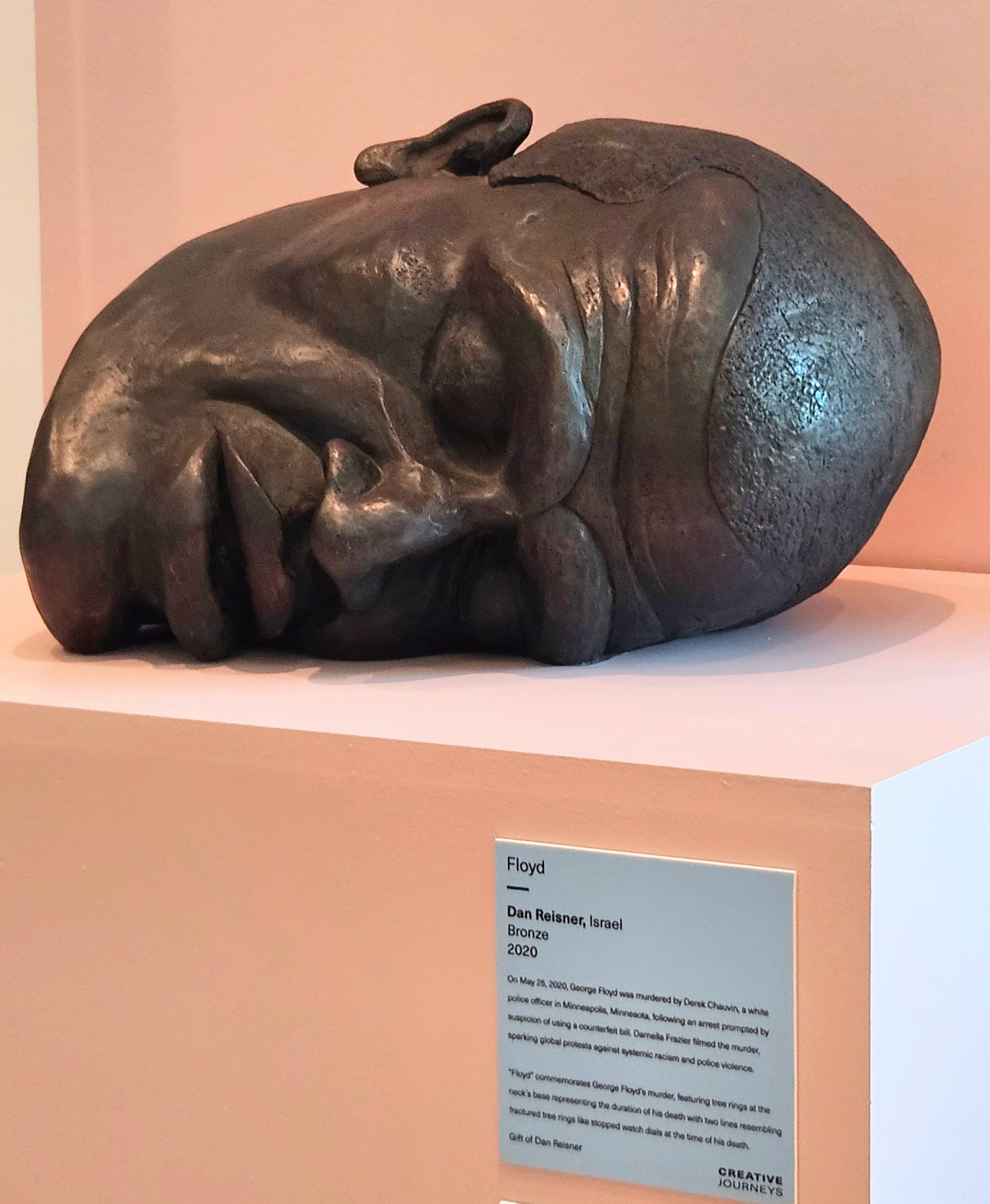
Floyd, 2020

Reisner works in his studio in Jaffa. He has taught sculpture at the Meirhof Center for Art Education at the Tel Aviv Museum of Art, Ort Evin High School, Ramat Gan, and Kalisher School of Art at the Tel Aviv-Jaffa, where he served as the director of the Sculpture Department.

In 2020, Reisner sculpted a bronze cast of George Floyd's head. The statue was made after Floyd's death in Minneapolis, Minnesota, in May 2020. The sculpture is lying on its left ear with its eyes closed and has tree rings-like around its neck, indicating the eight-plus minutes of his killing. Reisner donated the bust to the International African American Museum (IAAM) in Charleston, South Carolina.
