= Dan Margalit =

Dan Margalit may refer to:

- Dan Margalit (journalist) (1938–2025), Israeli journalist, author and television host
- Dan Margalit (mathematician) (born 1976), American mathematician
