= Dan Moloney (footballer) =

Australian rules footballer, born 1913

Personal information
- Full name: Daniel Henry Moloney
- Born: 9 April 1913; Fitzroy, Victoria
- Died: 22 January 1975 (aged 61); Brighton East, Victoria

Playing career^{1}
Years	Club	Games (Goals)
1932–34	Hawthorn	23 (0)
- ^{1} Playing statistics correct to the end of 1934.

Daniel Henry Moloney (9 April 1913 – 22 January 1975) was an Australian rules footballer who played with Hawthorn in the Victorian Football League (VFL).

== Military service ==
Moloney later served in the Royal Australian Air Force during World War II.

== Death ==
He died at East Brighton on 22 January 1975.
