= Dan Slane =

American businessman (born c. 1942)

- Born: 1942
- Died: 2020 (aged 77–78); Houston, Texas
- Known for: Businessman

Dan Slane (born c. 1942) was an American businessman. He was a former chairman of the board of trustees at the Ohio State University, from 2005 to 2006. He also served on the board of trustees at Hiram College from 1996 to 2001.

He graduated from Ohio State in 1967, then continued his education abroad. From 1968 to 1970, he served for two years in the United States Army. He was an assistant special prosecutor for Franklin County, Ohio for one year, and worked at the White House under Gerald Ford for two years.

In January 2008, he was appointed to the U.S. China Commission by House Minority Leader John Boehner on December 10, 2007. He was the USCC chairman in the 2010 report cycle and vice chairman in the 2011 report cycle. His two-year term, appointed by Speaker of the House Paul Ryan, expired on December 31, 2017. He lived in Westerville, Ohio.

Slane owned several businesses. He was chairman of The Slane Company, which has international branches in telecommunications, real estate development, lumber, and particle proton therapy and others. His tenure as chairman of the board of trustees of the Ohio State University expired in June 2006, but he remained affiliated with and supportive of the Ohio State University.
