= Dan Mubiru =

Ugandan footballer (born 1976)

Personal information
- Full name: Daniel Mubiru kusasira
- Date of birth: October 25, 1976 (age 50)
- Place of birth: Uganda
- Height: 1.80 m (5 ft 11 in)
- Position: Midfielder

Team information
- Current team: Police Jinja
- Number: 36

Youth career
- 1999–2000: Villa SC

Senior career*
Years	Team	Apps	(Gls)
2001–2002	Villa SC	9	(1)
2003–2004	Police Jinja	47	(2)

International career
2004	Uganda	1	(0)
- * Club domestic league appearances and goals as of August 31, 2007

Daniel Mubiru (born October 25, 1976) is a Ugandan football midfielder for Ugandan Premier League club Police Jinja.

== Career ==
He began his career by Villa SC in the Ugandan Premier League, before 2003 moving to Police Jinja.

== International ==
Mubiru played from 2002 to 2004 for the Uganda national football team.
