= Dan Kuwali =

Malawian brigadier general

Brigadier general (Professor) Dan Kuwali
- Education: LLD., Public International Law
- Occupations: Brigadier General, Judge Advocate General
- Years active: 2015-2023
- Employer: Malawian Defence Force
- Notable work: Persuasive Prevention: Towards a Mechanism for Implementing Article 4(h) and R2p by the African Union, The Responsibility to Protect (Raoul Wallenberg Institute Human Rights Library), By All Means Necessary: Protecting Civilians and Preventing Mass Atrocities in Africa, The Palgrave Handbook of Sustainable Peace and Security in Africa
- Title: Brigadier general (Professor)
- Website: https://www.linkedin.com/in/dan-kuwali-ll-d-6125093/

Brigadier general (professor) Dan Kuwali serves in the Malawian Defence Force as the Chief of Legal Services and Judge Advocate General. Dan Kuwali is an author, a Professor of International Law and International Relations at the University of Pretoria and an Affiliated Professor at the Raoul Wallenberg Institute of Human Rights and Humanitarian Law, Lund University.

== Early life and education ==
Brigadier General (Professor) Dan Kuwali, went to Dedza Secondary School. He holds a Master of Strategic Studies, War, Peace, Policy and Strategy from The United States Army War College and an LLD. (Doctor of Laws), in Public and International Law from Lund University.

== Publications ==
- Kuwali, Dan (August 2009). Persuasive Prevention: Towards a Mechanism for Implementing Article 4(h) and R2p by the African Union. Stylus Pub Llc. ISBN 978-91-7106-650-3.
- Kuwali, Dan (2010-12-10). The Responsibility to Protect. Martinus Nijhoff. ISBN 978-90-04-21596-2.
- Kuwali, Dan; Viljoen, Frans (2017-05-16). By all means necessary: Protecting civilians and preventing mass atrocities in Africa. PULP. ISBN 978-1-920538-66-8.
- Kuwali, Dan (2022-05-26). The Palgrave Handbook of Sustainable Peace and Security in Africa. Springer International Publishing. ISBN 978-3-030-82019-0.
- Kuwali, Dan; Viljoen, Frans (2014). Africa and the Responsibility to Protect. Routledge. ISBN 978-0-415-72231-5.
