= Dan Shea =

Dan or Daniel Shea may refer to:

- Dan Shea (actor) (born 1954), Canadian actor and stunt coordinator
- Dan Shea (producer), American record producer and composer
- Daniel J. Shea, American soldier
- Daniel J. Shea (judge) (born 1938), former justice of the Montana Supreme Court
- Danny Shea (1887–1960), English footballer
- Dan Shea (decathlete) (born 1896), American decathlete, winner of the 1921 USA Outdoor Track and Field Championships
