= Dan McLaughlin (golfer) =

American photographer and golfer

Dan McLaughlin (born June 27, 1979) is an American commercial photographer who famously quit his day job to become a professional golfer through 10,000 hours of deliberate practice. McLaughlin aimed to make a successful appearance in the PGA Tour Qualifying Tournament to eventually obtain his PGA Tour card and compete in amateur events.

== Golf ==
At the age of 30, with hopes of becoming a professional golfer, McLaughlin quit his job to learn to play golf. The goal of McLaughlin's plan was to qualify for the PGA Tour at the end of the 10,000 hours of practice. Since playing his first full round of golf in August 2011, McLaughlin ultimately lowered his handicap factor to 5.2 as of November 6, 2013.

== Influences ==
McLaughlin based his goal of 10,000 practice hours on a misinterpretation of a theory by Dr. K Anders Ericsson, Professor of Psychology at Florida State University.
