= Dan Delaunay =

French footballer (born 1995)

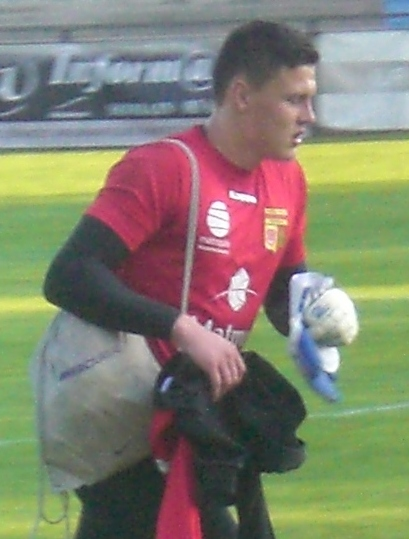
- Delaunay with Quevilly-Rouen in 2015

Personal information
- Full name: Dan Delaunay
- Date of birth: 8 April 1995 (age 31)
- Place of birth: Le Havre, France
- Height: 1.87 m (6 ft 2 in)
- Position: Goalkeeper

Youth career
- 2001–2002: US Saint-Thomas
- 2002–2013: Le Havre

Senior career*
Years	Team	Apps	(Gls)
2013	Le Havre B	1	(0)
2013–2015	Quevilly-Rouen B	17	(0)
2014–2018	Quevilly-Rouen (Note: In 2015, US Quevilly was renamed to US Quevilly-Rouen Métropole.)	79	(0)
2018–2020	Les Herbiers	17	(0)
2020–2021	Rumilly-Vallières	8	(0)
2021–2023	Versailles	8	(0)
2023–2024	Cholet	0	(0)

International career
2010	France U16	1	(0)
- * Club domestic league appearances and goals as of 22:32, 15 August 2024 (UTC)

Dan Delaunay (born 8 April 1995) is a French professional footballer who plays as a goalkeeper.

== Club career ==
Delaunay is a youth product of Le Havre, and helped Quevilly-Rouen into the Ligue 2 after consecutive promotions. Delaunay made his professional debut for Quevilly in a 1–0 Coupe de la Ligue loss to Orléans on 8 August 2017. He made his Ligue 2 debut in a 4–1 loss to Nîmes on 3 November 2017.

== International career ==
Delaunay is a one-time youth international for France, helping the France national under-16 football team win a 2–0 friendly against the Belgium U16s on 23 September 2010.

== Honours ==
Versailles

- Championnat National 2: 2021–22
