= Dan Roden =

American medical researcher

- Born: Dan Roden; 1950 (age 75–76); Montreal, Quebec, Canada
- Citizenship: American
- Education: McGill University
- Known for: Personalized medicine
- Awards: Fellow of the American Association for the Advancement of Science
- Scientific career
- Fields: Medical genetics
- Institutions: Vanderbilt University

Dan Roden (born 1950) is a Canadian-born American medical researcher known for his work in personalized medicine. He is Professor of Medicine, Pharmacology and Biomedical Informatics at the Vanderbilt University School of Medicine, where he holds the Sam L. Clark Endowed Chair and serves at the Senior Vice President for Personalized Medicine. He is also the director of Vanderbilt University's BioVU project, which is a biobank linking individuals' DNA samples to their medical records.

Roden was born and raised in Montreal, Quebec, Canada, where he received his medical degree from McGill University. He then received his training at Vanderbilt University in cardiology and pharmacology, and he has been a faculty member there ever since. He is a member of the American Society for Clinical Investigation and the Association of American Physicians, as well as a fellow of the American Association for the Advancement of Science.
