= Dan Fleisch =

American physicist

Daniel "Dan" Fleisch is an American physicist who specializes in electromagnetics and space physics. He is a Professor Emeritus of Physics at Wittenberg University.

A minor planet is named after him.

== Biography ==
Fleisch earned his B.S. from Georgetown University and his M.S. and Ph.D. from Rice University in space physics and astronomy. He has been a professor at Wittenberg University since 1998.

Fleisch has provided science commentary for PBS station WYSO, and in 2006, appeared in the documentary The Dayton Codebreakers.

== Writing ==
Fleisch has authored several textbooks, including A Student's Guide to Maxwell's Equations (2008) and A Student's Guide to Vectors and Tensors (2011). His other works include A Student's Guide to the Mathematics of Astronomy and A Student's Guide to Waves, published in 2013 and 2014, respectively. In 2020, he published A Student's Guide to the Schrödinger equation. His work has been translated into multiple languages, including Japanese, Korean, Chinese, and Italian.
