= Dan McCormack =

Dan McCormack may refer to:

- Dan McCormack (hurler) (born 1993), Irish hurler
- Dan McCormack (photographer) (born 1944), photographer and professor at Marist College, New York
