= Dan Mintz (disambiguation) =

Dan or Daniel Mintz may refer to:

- Dan Mintz, an American comedian, voice actor and writer
- Dan Mintz (executive), an American film producer, director and executive
- Daniel Mintz, an actor in Armour of God II: Operation Condor
