= Dan Glickberg =

American businessman

- Born: Daniel Glickberg
- Education: Trinity College
- Occupations: Businessman, investor
- Known for: Food Fortunes, Fairway Market

Dan Glickberg is an American businessman. He is a member of Fairway Market's founding family and served as executive vice president and a director of the company. Additionally, he is the founder of Dan Glickberg Food, and is a featured investor on the Food Network show Food Fortunes.

== Career ==
Glickberg earned a bachelor's degree in English and writing from Trinity College. He is the great grandson of Fairway Market's founder, Nathan Glickberg and became the face of Fairway Market. In 2005, Glickberg began serving as vice president of Fairway.

In 2006, Glickberg designed the company website Discover Fairway which included weekly video food tips and cooking demonstrations. The site lead to a cooperation with WNBC that Glickberg oversaw. He later became a director of Fairway in June 2010.

Glickberg left Fairway and founded Dan Glickberg Food, a food consulting and venture-capital company in April 2013. In 2015, Glickberg joined the cast of Food Network's "Food Fortune," a show that gives new food companies a chance to enter the market and grow their business through the help of the show's featured investors.
