= Dan Mahoney =

Dan Mahoney may refer to:

- Dan Mahoney (journalist) (1916–1999), Irish-American journalist investigated for possible Communist activities
- Dan Mahoney (baseball) (1864–1904), American baseball player
- Dan Mahoney (politician) (1909–1996), Australian politician
- Danny Mahoney (1888–1960), American baseball player
