= Dan Siegel =

Dan Siegel may refer to:

- Dan Siegel (musician), American musician
- Dan Siegel (attorney) (1945–2025), American lawyer
- Daniel J. Siegel (born 1957), American physician
