= Dan Zhang (academic) =

Chinese-American operations researcher (born 1978)

Dan Zhang (born 1978) is a Chinese-American operations researcher. He is professor of operations management in the Leeds School of Business of the University of Colorado Boulder.

== Education and career ==
Zhang was born in 1978 in China, and is a naturalized citizen of the US. He received his Ph.D. in industrial engineering from University of Minnesota in 2005 after B.E. in mechanical engineering M.E. in manufacturing engineering, both from Chongqing University in China. Following completion of his Ph.D., Zhang was a visiting scholar at the University of Chicago's Booth School of Business. Zhang's first faculty position was as an assistant professor at the Desautels Faculty of Management, McGill University. Zhang joined the University of Colorado-Boulder as an assistant professor of operations management in 2011, and became professor of operations management in 2018.

== Service ==
Zhang served as chair of the Institute for Operations Research and the Management Sciences (INFORMS) Revenue Management and Pricing Section beginning in 2017. He was also president of the INFORMS Rocky Mountain Section for 2016–2017.
