= Dan Nguyen (disambiguation) =

Dan Nguyen (born 1991) is a German field hockey player.

Daniel Nguyen may also refer to:

- Daniel Nguyen (born 1990), Vietnamese tennis player
- Daniel Nguyen (politician), American politician in the Oregon House of Representatives
- Danny Nguyen (fl. 1981–2008), Vietnamese American professional poker player
