= Dan Stanca =

Romanian writer (born 1955)

Dan Stanca (Bucharest, September 30, 1955) is a Romanian writer.

== Life ==
He studied English literature at the University of Bucharest and worked as a journalist for the cultural magazine România Liberă until 2008.

== Works ==
- Vântul sau țipătul altuia, 1992
- Aripile arhanghelului Mihail, 1996
- Apocalips amânat, 1997
- Ultima biserica, 1997
- Ritualul noptii, 1998
- Morminte străvezii, 1999
- Ultimul om, 1999
- Pasarea orbilor, 2001
- Drumul spre piatră, 2002
- Mila frunzelor, 2003
- A doua zi după moarte, 2003
- Mut, 2006
- Noaptea lui Iuda, 2007
- Cei calzi si cei reci , 2008
- Mutilare ,2010
- A doua zi dupa moarte ,2011
- Craii si mortii ,2012
- Mare amară, 2014
- Ghetsimani '51, 2015
- Anii frigului , 2017

== Prizes ==
- Uniunii Scriitorilor din România, 2015, „Ghetsimani ’51” (Editura Cartea Românească).
