= Dan Petrescu (disambiguation) =

Dan Petrescu may refer to:

- Dan Petrescu (b. 1967), Romanian football manager and former player
- Dan Petrescu (businessman) (1953–2021), Romanian businessman and billionaire, one of the richest persons in Romania at the time
- Dan Petrescu (writer) (b. 1949), Romanian writer, essayist and translator, see Mircea Nedelciu
