= Dan Duffy (artist) =

American artist

Dan Duffy is an American calligram artist in Flourtown, Pennsylvania, USA. He founded, owns, and operates Art of Words, a small business that designs and sells calligram prints depicting famous athletes, sports venues, city skylines, and other subjects.

== Early life and artistic education ==
Born in Lansdale, Pennsylvania, Duffy grew up in Norristown, Pennsylvania.

Duffy majored in art at Indiana University of Pennsylvania, where he also played rugby. He then enrolled in the Hussian School of Art (now Hussian College) in Philadelphia, Pennsylvania where he graduated from in 2006.

At the Hussian School, Duffy completed a calligram as an assignment. Calligrams are texts arranged to form a thematically related image. The calligram assignment used only three words. Duffy recalls thinking if he could use more words, he “might actually be able to make it into an illustration.”

After art school, Duffy worked as a graphic designer, creating illustrations and designs for ESPN and Golf Digest, among other companies. From 2007-11, Duffy was Associate Art Director for PGA Magazine.“The magazines would ask me to come up with an image for the article,” Duffy said, “which led me to think how cool it would be to make the article into the image.”

== Early career ==
In 2008, Duffy met his now wife. The couple were both Philadelphia Phillies fans and watched the team’s 2008 postseason and World Series championship together. To impress her, Duffy decided he would create a “Road to the World Series” image of pitcher Brad Lidge by writing the date, opponent, and final score of every Phillies game in the season.

In 2009, Duffy began selling prints of his Phillies “Road to the World Series” piece in the parking lot of Citizens Bank Park, where the Phillies play. Representatives of Major League Baseball (MLB) informed him he needed a license to sell his work. At the Office of the Commissioner of Baseball in New York, Duffy pitched MLB on a series of “Road to the World Series” pieces for every winning team and became an official MLB licensee.

Originally doing business as Lionword and then as Philly Word Art, Duffy specialized in Philadelphia sports figures and landmarks.

He has also created custom pieces for clients, such as portraits of their favorite athlete or images formed by writing people’s wedding vows.

== Art of Words ==
In 2016, Duffy launched a Kickstarter campaign to establish Art of Words, adding skylines of New York City, Philadelphia, Chicago, and Washington, D.C. to his catalog. By 2017, his prints also included such nationally recognized sports venues as Wrigley Field, Fenway Park, and Yankee Stadium.

Initially, Duffy sold his work at local art shows, festivals, craft fairs, and flea markets. Philly Word Art was in several Philadelphia art stores and had as many as four holiday stores between Philadelphia and Baltimore, Maryland.

During the COVID-19 pandemic in 2020, Duffy moved Art of Words entirely online.

== Technique ==
Duffy relies on his art school training in pointillism when creating his images. He says he first became aware of the technique at age seven while watching the film Ferris Bueller’s Day Off. In one film sequence, the camera zooms in on George Seurat’s painting A Sunday Afternoon on the Island of La Grande Jatte (1884-1886) to show its pointillist technique. “I remember the sequences of shots,” Duffy said, “[t]hinking, ‘[W]oah that’s so cool.’”

When creating a piece, Duffy and the Art of Words team will first research the information to be included in a piece online and print it out for Duffy to mark his progress as he writes.

“I like using a lot of words,” Duffy said, “because you get more detail. With less words, you can’t get as detailed and they might look a little more modern.”

Next, Duffy creates a composite image of the subject from several pre-existing photographs. “I don’t like to duplicate an image that already exists, so I create my own,” he says.

Duffy then sketches his subject in pencil and calculates how to fit the content into the available number of lines. He uses a variety of pens and inks to write the piece on a bristol board, which typically measures 28 by 22 inches. Duffy writes in an Arial style for simplicity and clarity, using other lettering styles when appropriate.

Duffy finishes his pieces by darkening the letters to help shape the image, and coloring them with a variety of different pens, inks, and markers. Duffy does not use digital tools for touch-up beyond adjusting the levels of black and white or fixing an occasional misspelling.

From research to completion, each piece takes Duffy at least 50 hours, with what he calls “more ambitious pieces” requiring 150-200 hours.

== Reception ==
Duffy’s art has frequently been covered by and featured in local and national media, including Sports Illustrated, the Washington Post, the Baltimore Sun, Fox Sports the New York Daily News USA Today, and several local television network affiliate stations.

Duffy has created large word art pieces live for organizations including TED Talks, Ameriprise Financial, and the 2016 Democratic National Convention.
