= Dan Stone =

Dan Stone may refer to:

- Dan Stone (DJ), British DJ
- Dan Stone (historian) (born 1971), English historian
- Daniel Stone (author), American author and historian

== See also ==
- Daniel Stone, one of the Rosemarkie sculpture fragments
