= Dan Sickles =

Dan Sickles may refer to:

- Daniel Sickles (1819–1914), American politician, soldier, and diplomat
- Dan Sickles (director), American documentary film director, writer, actor and producer
