= Danny =

- Pronunciation: /dæn.i/
- Gender: Male

Other names
- Related names: Dan, Dennis, Daniel

Danny is a masculine given name.

Notable people with the name include:

== People ==
=== A ===
- Danny Abeckaser, American actor and filmmaker
- Danny Ablett (born 1976), Scottish rugby union player
- Danny Abramowicz (born 1945), American football player
- Danny Acosta, American baseball coach
- Danny Adcock, Australian actor
- Danny Addy, Scottish rugby league footballer and coach
- Danny Adeline (born 1963), Seychellois windsurfer
- Danny Agbelese (born 1990), American basketball player
- Danny Aguilar (born 1986), Colombian football striker
- Danny Ahn (born 1978), Korean-American rapper and actor
- Danny Aiello (1933–2019), American actor
- Danny Aiello III (1957–2010), American actor
- Danny Aiken (born 1988), American football player
- Danny Ainge (born 1959), American basketball executive
- Danny Alcock (born 1984), English footballer
- Danny Alder (born 1978), Australian actor
- Danny Alderman (born 1976), English cricketer
- Danny Alias, American dramatist
- Danny Allan (born 1989), English rugby league player
- Danny Allsopp (born 1978), Australian soccer player
- Danny Almonte (born 1987), Dominican Republic professional baseball player
- Danny Alsabbagh, Australian actor
- Danny Altmann, British immunologist
- Danny Alvin (1902–1958), American jazz drummer
- Danny Amankwaa (born 1994), Danish footballer
- Danny Amaral (born 1973), Canadian soccer player and coach
- Danny Amendola (born 1985), American football player
- Danny Andersen (born 1983), Danish footballer
- Danny Andrew (born 1990), English footballer
- Danny Andrews, American Paralympic athlete
- Danny Ansell (born 1991), Welsh rugby league footballer
- Danny Antonucci (born 1957), Canadian animator, cartoonist, director, producer, writer and voice actor
- Danny Ardoin (born 1974), American baseball player
- Danny Arndt (born 1955), Canadian ice hockey player
- Danny Atar (born 1958), Israeli politician
- Danny Auerbach (born 1979, "Solly Krieger"), American world champion middleweight boxer
- Danny Ávila (born 1995), Spanish DJ and producer
- Danny Avula, American politician
- Danny Axford (born 1975), English cyclist
- Danny Ayalon (born 1955), Israeli diplomat, columnist and politician
- Danny Ayres (1986–2020), British speedway rider

=== B ===
- Danny Baggish (born 1983), American darts player
- Danny Bagwell (born 1960), American racing driver
- Danny van Bakel (born 1983), Dutch footballer
- Danny Baker (born 1957), English journalist, radio and TV presenter
- Danny Bakewell, American civil rights activist
- Danny Bakker, multiple people
- Danny Balin (born 1982), American professional golfer
- Danny Bampton (born 1980), Australian rugby league footballer
- Danny Bance (born 1982), English footballer
- Danny Banda, Canadian football player
- Danny Bank (1922–2010), American jazz musician
- Danny Barakat (born 1981), Lebanese rugby league footballer
- Danny Baranowsky (born 1984), American electronic music composer
- Danny Barbir (born 1998), American soccer player
- Danny Barcelona (1929–2007), American drummer
- Danny Barnes, multiple people
- Danny Barrett, multiple people
- Danny Barrow (born 1995), English footballer
- Danny Bartley (born 1947), English footballer
- Danny Basavich (1978–2023), American pool player
- Danny Bass (born 1958), American gridiron football player
- Danny Batten (born 1987), American football player
- Danny Batth (born 1990), English footballer
- Danny Battochio (born 1985), Canadian ice hockey player
- Danny Baugher (born 1984), American football player
- Danny Bautista (born 1972), Dominican baseball player
- Danny Beales, British politician
- Danny Beath (1960–2013), British photographer and botanist
- Danny Beauchamp (1969–2010), Seychellois track and field athlete
- Danny Bejarano (born 1994), Bolivian footballer
- Danny Belisle (1937–2022), Canadian ice hockey player
- Danny Ben-Israel (1944–2019), Israeli musician
- Danny Ben-Moshe, Australian academic and filmmaker
- Danny Benstock (born 1970), English footballer
- Danny Bergara (1942–2007), Uruguayan footballer and manager
- Danny Bernardi, British writer
- Danny Betancourt (born 1981), Cuban baseball player
- Danny Bew, English footballer
- Danny Bhoy (born 1975), Scottish comedian
- Danny Biasone (1909–1992), American businessman
- Danny Bible (1951–2018), American executed serial killer
- Danny Biega (born 1991), Canadian ice hockey player
- Danny Bilson (born 1956), American writer and director
- Danny aus den Birken (born 1985), German ice hockey player
- Danny Blair (1905–1985), Scottish footballer
- Danny Blanchett (born 1987), English footballer
- Danny Blanchflower (1926–1993), Northern Irish footballer
- Danny Blind (born 1961), Dutch association football player and manager
- Danny Blum (born 1991), German footballer
- Danny Blume (born 1960), American composer
- Danny Boffin (born 1965), Belgian football coach and former player
- Danny Julian Boggs (born 1944), American judge and lawyer
- Danny Bohn (born 1988), American racing driver
- Danny Bois (born 1983), Canadian ice hockey player
- Danny Bonaduce (born 1959), American professional wrestler
- Danny Bond (born 1997), Brazilian rapper and singer
- Danny Boshell (born 1981), English footballer
- Danny Bowers (born 1955), English footballer
- Danny Bowes (born 1960), British singer
- Danny Bowien (born 1982), American chef
- Danny Boxall (born 1977), English footballer
- Danny Boxshall (1920–2009), English footballer
- Danny Boy (rapper) (born 1968), rap/hip hop artist
- Danny Boy (singer) (born 1977), R&B/soul singer
- Danny Brabham (1941–2011), American football player
- Danny Brannagan (born 1986), Canadian football player
- Danny Bravo (born 1948), American actor
- Danny Breaks, British drum and bass DJ, record producer and record label owner
- Danny Breeden (born 1942), American baseball player
- Danny Breitfelder (born 1997), German footballer
- Danny Bridge (born 1993), Irish rugby league footballer
- Danny Briggs (born 1991), English cricketer
- Danny Briggs (golfer) (born 1960), American professional golfer
- Danny Britt (born 1979), American politician
- Danny Brochu (born 1970), Canadian actor
- Danny Brocklehurst, English screenwriter and journalist
- Danny Brom (born 1955), Dutch psychologist
- Danny Brough (born 1983), English-Scottish rugby league footballer
- Danny Joe Brown (1951–2005), American singer, Molly Hatchet
- Danny Bruno (born 1952), American actor
- Danny Bubp (born 1954), American politician
- Danny Buckingham (born 1964), Australian cricket player
- Danny Buday (born 1977), American filmmaker
- Danny Buderus (born 1978), Australian rugby league footballer
- Danny Buggs (born 1953), American football player
- Danny Buijs (born 1982), Dutch footballer and manager
- Danny Burawa (born 1988), American baseball pitcher
- Danny Burch (born 1981), British professional wrestler
- Danny Burmeister (born 1963), American football player
- Danny Burstein (born 1964), American actor and singer
- Danny Busick, American politician
- Danny Butterfield (born 1979), English footballer
- Danny Butterworth (born 1999), English footballer
- Danny Byrd (born 1979), English DJ and record producer

=== C ===
- Danny Cadamarteri (born 1979), English footballer
- Danny Cage (born 1973), American professional wrestler
- Danny Calegari (born 1972), American mathematician
- Danny Califf (born 1980), American soccer player
- Danny Canning (1926–2014), Welsh footballer
- Danny Cannon (born 1968), English film director
- Danny Care (born 1987), English rugby league footballer
- Danny Care (soccer) (born 1974), American soccer player
- Danny Carlton (born 1983), English footballer
- Danny Carroll, multiple people
- Danny Carson (born 1981), English footballer
- Danny Carvajal (born 1989), Costa Rican footballer
- Danny Casas (born 1986), Mexican professional wrestler
- Danny Cashman (born 2001), English footballer
- Danny Casolaro (1947–1991), American writer
- Danny Castillo (born 1979), American mixed martial artist
- Danny Cater (born 1940), American baseball player
- Danny Cedrone (1920–1954), American guitarist and bandleader
- Danny Ceisler, American attorney and sheriff
- Danny Cepero (born 1985), American soccer player
- Danny Chambers (born 1982), British politician and veterinary surgeon
- Danny Chan, multiple people
- Danny Chandler (1959–2010), American motorcycle racer
- Danny Chapman (born 1974), English footballer
- Danny Chard (born 1980), English cricketer
- Danny Chauncey (born 1956), American musician
- Danny Chew (born 1962), American cyclist
- Danny Chew Ji Xiang (born 1987), Singaporean footballer
- Danny Chia (born 1972), Malaysian professional golfer
- Danny Chiha (born 1985), Lebanese rugby league footballer
- Danny Ching, American paddleboarder and canoe paddler
- Danny Choi (born 1994), South Korean footballer
- Danny Choo (born 1972), British entrepreneur and television producer
- Danny Bawa Chrisnanta (born 1988), Singaporean badminton player and coach
- Danny Cipriani (born 1987), English rugby union player
- Danny Clapton (1934–1986), English footballer
- Danny Clark, multiple people
- Danny Clarke, British horticulturist
- Danny Clay (born 1961), American baseball player
- Danny Clayton (born 1986), Australian television presenter
- Danny Click (born 1960), American singer-songwriter
- Danny Clinch, American photographer and film director
- Danny Clyburn (1974–2012), American baseball player
- Danny Coale (born 1988), American football player
- Danny Cocke, American professional film, trailer and advertising music composer
- Danny Codling (born 1979), New Zealand boxer
- Danny Coid (born 1981), English footballer
- Danny Colbert (born 1950), American football player
- Danny Coles (born 1981), English footballer
- Danny Collinge (born 1998), English footballer
- Danny Boy Collins (born 1967), English wrestler
- Danny Comden (born 1969), American actor
- Danny Cooksey (born 1975), American actor
- Danny Coombs (born 1942), American baseball player
- Danny Copeland (born 1966), American football player
- Danny Coralles, American musician
- Danny Corbett (1949–2016), American politician
- Danny Corcoran, multiple people
- Danny Core (born 1981), American professional baseball player
- Danny Corkill (born 1974), American actor
- Danny Costain, American politician
- Danny Coughlin (1897–1963), American football player
- Danny Coulombe (born 1989), American baseball player
- Danny Coulson (born 1941), FBI executive
- Danny Cowley (born 1978), English footballer and manager
- Danny Cowling (born 1991), English rugby league footballer
- Danny Cox, multiple people
- Danny Coyne (born 1973), Welsh footballer
- Danny Crainie (born 1962), Scottish footballer
- Danny Crates (born 1973), British Paralympic athlete
- Danny Craven (born 1967), Australian rules footballer
- Danny Craven (rugby league) (born 1991), English rugby league footballer
- Danny Crawford (born 1953), American basketball referee
- Danny Crawford (politician) (born 1950), American politician
- Danny Crerand (born 1969), English footballer
- Danny Cronic, American football coach
- Danny Crossman (born 1967), American football player and coach
- Danny Cullen, Irish hurler
- Danny Cullip (born 1976), English footballer
- Danny Culloty (born 1964), Gaelic football player
- Danny Cummins (born 1990), Irish sportsperson
- Danny Curran (born 1981), English footballer

=== D ===
- Danny Daelman (born 1969), Belgian cyclist
- Danny Dahill (1919–2013), American lawyer and legislator
- Danny Dalla-Longa (born 1953), Canadian politician and businessman
- Danny Danon (born 1971), Israeli politician
- Danny Dare (1905–1996), American film director
- Danny Dark (1938–2004), American voice-over artist
- Danny Darwin (born 1955), American baseball player
- Danny Abdul Dayem, British citizen of Syrian descent
- Danny De Bie (born 1960), Belgian cyclist
- Danny Deakin (born 1993), English footballer
- Danny DeKeyser (born 1990), American ice hockey player
- Danny Del-Re (born 1968), Australian rules footballer
- Danny Delaney (died 2020), Gaelic footballer
- Danny Demyanenko (born 1994), Canadian volleyball player
- Danny Denholm (born 1990), Scottish footballer
- Danny Denzongpa (born 1948), Indian actor, playback singer, film director and liquor baron
- Danny Desriveaux (born 1981), Canadian football player
- Danny DeVall (born 1972), American soccer player
- Danny DeVito (born 1944), American actor
- Danny Devos (born 1959), Belgian performance artist
- Danny Diablo (born 1971), American vocalist
- Danny Dias (c. 1983–2017), American activist
- Danny Dichio (born 1974), English footballer
- Danny Dickfos (born 1970), Australian rules footballer
- Danny Dietz (1980–2005), United States Navy SEAL and recipient
- Danny Diggs (born c. 1957), American politician
- Danny Dignum (born 1992), English boxer
- Danny DiLiberto (1935–2025), American pool player
- Danny Dill (1924–2008), American county music singer and songwriter
- Danny DiPrima (born 1991), American soccer player
- Danny Diver (born 1966), Scottish footballer and manager
- Danny Docherty (born 1961), Scottish footballer
- Danny Dolev, Israeli computer scientist
- Danny Domingo (born 1951), Filipino politician
- Danny van Dongen (born 1983), Dutch racing driver
- Danny Matt Dorgan (1906–1956), Irish hurler
- Danny Doring (born 1974), American professional wrestler
- Danny Dorling (born 1968), British social geographer
- Danny Dorn (born 1984), American baseball player
- Danny Downes (born 1986), American mixed martial artist
- Danny Drake (born 1995), New Zealand rugby union footballer
- Danny Drinkwater (born 1990), English footballer
- Danny Driver (born 1977), British pianist
- Danny Duffy (born 1988), American baseball player
- Danny Duggan (born 1987), Canadian professional wrestler
- Danny Dumaresque (born 1959), Canadian politician
- Danny Duncan (musician) (born 1986), musician, We the Kings
- Danny Dunlop, Canadian filmmaker
- Danny Dunton (1924–2015), British speedway rider
- Danny Dyer (born 1977), English actor
- Danny Dyszelski (born 2008), American racing driver

=== E ===
- Danny Earls (born 1989), Irish footballer and artist
- Danny East (born 1992), English footballer
- Danny Ecker (born 1977), German pole vaulter
- Danny Edgar (1910–1991), English footballer
- Danny Efland (born 1988), American stock car racing driver
- Danny Efroni (born 1958), Chief Military Advocate General of the Israel Defense Forces
- Danny Eichelbaum (born 1973), German politician
- Danny Eite (born 2003), English rugby union player
- Danny Elfman (born 1953), American musician
- Danny Elizabeth, Seychellois Anglican bishop
- Danny Ellison (born 1972), English rugby league footballer
- Danny Emerton (born 1991), English footballer
- Danny Epps (1941–2007), American musician
- Danny Ervik (born 1989), Swedish footballer
- Danny Escobedo (born 1937), American petitioner
- Danny Eslick (born 1986), American motorcycle racer
- Danny Espinosa (born 1987), American baseball player
- Danny Esteves (born 1994), Portuguese footballer
- Danny Etling (born 1994), American football player
- Danny Etzioni (born 1959), Israeli footballer
- Danny Everett (born 1966), American former track and field athlete
- Danny Eyre, American politician

=== F ===
- Danny Fabry, Belgian singer
- Danny Facey, Grenadian international footballer
- Danny Faragher (born 1947), American musician
- Danny Fargo (1959–2003), American professional wrestler
- Danny Farmer (born 1977), American football player
- Danny Farquhar (born 1987), American baseball player
- Danny Farrant, British musician
- Danny Farrar (born 1968), Australian rugby league footballer
- Danny Faundez (born 1993), American soccer player
- Danny Faure (born 1962), Seychellois politician
- Danny Federici (1950–2008), American musician
- Danny Fenster, American journalist
- Danny Ferry (born 1966), American basketball player
- Danny Ferry (footballer) (born 1977), Scottish footballer
- Danny Fields (born 1939), American music manager, publicist, journalist and author
- Danny Fife (1949–2024), American baseball player
- Danny Figueroa (1959–1998), American serial killer
- Danny Fingeroth, American comic book writer
- Danny Finkleman, Canadian journalist and radio host
- Danny Finn (1928–2007), American basketball player
- Danny Fiszman (1945–2011), English businessman
- Danny Fitzgerald, multiple people
- Danny Flaherty (1873–1901), Australian rules footballer
- Danny Flanagan (1924–2019), Irish footballer
- Danny Fletcher (born 1997), English footballer
- Danny Florencio (1947–2018), Filipino basketball player
- Danny Flowers (born 1948), American songwriter
- Danny Fonseca (born 1979), Costa Rican footballer
- Danny Ford (born 1948), American football player and coach
- Danny Ford (politician) (born 1952), American politician
- Danny Formal (born 1995), Costa Rican racing driver
- Danny Forrest (born 1984), English footballer and manager
- Danny Forster (born 1977), American television host, producer and architect
- Danny Fortson (born 1976), American basketball player
- Danny Fowler (born 1956), English snooker player
- Danny Fraticelli (born 1977), Puerto Rican musician
- Danny Frawley (1963–2019), Australian rules footballer
- Danny Freymark (born 1983), German politician
- Danny Friend (1873–1942), American baseball player
- Danny Frisella (1946–1977), American baseball player
- Danny Frolich, American artist
- Danny Fualalo (born 1994), Australian rugby league footballer
- Danny Fuchs (born 1976), German footballer
- Danny Furler (born 1982), American surfer
- Danny Fulton (born 1956), American football player
- Danny Fury, Swiss drummer
- Danny Fütterer (born 1975), German footballer

=== G ===
- Danny Gabbidon (born 1979), Welsh footballer
- Danny Gaither (1938–2001), American singer
- Danny Galea (born 1983), Australian rugby league footballer
- Danny Gallivan (1917–1993), Canadian sportscaster
- Danny Galm (born 1986), German footballer
- Danny Gans (1956–2009), American singer
- Danny Gardella (1920–2005), American baseball player
- Danny Gardiner (1939–2015), British rugby league footballer
- Danny Gare (born 1954), Canadian ice hockey player
- Danny Garibay, American music producer
- Danny Garrett (born 1957), American politician
- Danny Gathings (born 1980), American basketball player
- Danny Gatton (1945–1994), American guitarist
- Danny Gavidia, Peruvian film and television director and cinematographer
- Danny Gay, multiple people
- Danny Gerard (born 1977), American actor and musician
- Danny Gilmore (born 1973), Canadian actor
- Danny Gilmore (politician) (born 1949), American politician
- Danny Glackin, Northern Irish swimmer
- Danny Glicker, American costume designer
- Danny Gloor (born 1952), Canadian ice hockey player
- Danny Glover (born 1946), American actor
- Danny Glover (footballer) (born 1989), English footballer
- Danny Godby (born 1946), American baseball player
- Danny Goffey (born 1974), English musician and singer
- Danny Gokey (born 1980), American singer
- Danny Gold, multiple people
- Danny Goldring (1946–2022), American film, stage and television actor
- Danny Gonzales (born 1976), American football player
- Danny Goodman, American computer programmer
- Danny Gorrer (born 1986), American football player
- Danny Gosset (born 1994), Welsh footballer
- Danny Gottlieb (born 1953), American drummer
- Danny Graham (disambiguation), multiple people
- Danny Grainger (born 1986), English footballer
- Danny Granville (born 1975), English footballer
- Danny Graves (born 1973), American baseball player
- Danny Graves (racing driver), (1921–1965), American racing driver
- Danny Gray (rugby union) (born 1983), English rugby union footballer
- Danny Gray (American football) (born 1999), American football player
- Danny Greefhorst (born 1972), Dutch enterprise architect
- Danny Green (disambiguation), multiple people
- Danny Greenspoon, Canadian music producer
- Danny Grewcock (born 1972), English rugby union footballer
- Danny Grieves (born 1978), English footballer
- Danny Grimley (born 1972), Australian rugby league footballer
- Danny Grimshaw (born 1986), English rugby league footballer
- Danny Grissett, American jazz pianist, keyboardist and composer
- Danny Grossman (1942–2023), Canadian dancer and choreographer
- Danny Groulx (born 1981), Canadian ice hockey player
- Danny Groulx (Canadian football) (born 1990), Canadian football player
- Danny Groves (born 1990), English footballer
- Danny Gruen (born 1952), Canadian ice hockey player
- Danny Guijt (born 1981), Dutch footballer
- Danny Guinane (1911–1992), Australian rules footballer
- Danny Guthrie (born 1987), English association football player

=== H ===
- Danny van Haaren (born 1997), Dutch footballer
- Danny Hakim (born 1971), American journalist
- Danny Halligan (born 1965), New Zealand footballer
- Danny Halliwell (born 1981), English rugby league footballer
- Danny Halloran (1954–2012), Australian rules footballer
- Danny Halsey (born 1988), British speedway rider
- Danny Hamrick (born 1988), American politician
- Danny Handley, British musician
- Danny Handling (born 1994), Scottish footballer
- Danny Harf, American wakeboarder
- Danny Hargrave (1978–2019), English rugby league footballer
- Danny L Harle (born 1989), British music producer and composer
- Danny Hatchard (born 1991), English actor
- Danny Hatcher (born 1983), English footballer
- Danny Havoc (1986–2020), American professional wrestler
- Danny Hay (born 1975), New Zealand association football player
- Danny Healy-Rae (born 1954), Irish politician
- Danny Hearn (born 1940), English rugby union player
- Danny Heater, American basketball player
- Danny Heatley, multiple people
- Danny Heep (born 1957), American baseball player
- Danny Hegan (1943–2015), professional footballer
- Danny Hegarty (born 1944), Australian rules footballer
- Danny Heifetz, American musician
- Danny Heister (born 1971), Dutch table tennis player
- Danny de Hek, New Zealand YouTuber
- Danny Hellebuyck (1933–2001), Belgian boxer
- Danny Hellman (born 1964), American cartoonist
- Danny Henriques (born 1997), Dutch footballer
- Danny Herrington (1960–2005), Scottish rugby union player
- Danny Hesp (born 1969), Dutch professional footballer
- Danny Hibbert (born 1948), Australian rules footballer
- Danny Higginbotham (born 1978), English association football player
- Danny Hill, multiple people
- Danny Hilliard (born 1957), American politician
- Danny Hillis (born 1956), American computer scientist
- Danny Hinshelwood (born 1975), English footballer
- Danny Hobbs-Awoyemi (born 1994), English rugby union player
- Danny Hockton (born 1979), English footballer
- Danny Hodge (1932–2020), American boxer and wrestler
- Danny Hoekman (born 1964), Dutch footballer and manager
- Danny Hoesen (born 1991), Dutch footballer
- Danny Hoffman (1880–1922), American baseball player
- Danny Holla (born 1987), Dutch footballer
- Danny Hollands (born 1985), English footballer
- Danny Hollis, American singer-songwriter
- Danny Holmes (born 1989), English footballer
- Danny Holyoak (born 1983), English footballer
- Danny Hone (born 1989), English footballer
- Danny Hope (born 1959), American football player and coach
- Danny Houghton (born 1988), English professional rugby league footballer
- Danny Howells (born 1970), British musician
- Danny Hudson (born 1979), English footballer
- Danny Hultzen (born 1989), American baseball player
- Danny Hurcombe (1896–1965), Welsh rugby union and rugby league footballer
- Danny Hutchins (born 1989), English footballer
- Danny Hutchinson, American football player and coach
- Danny Hutton (born 1942), Irish-American singer
- Danny Huwé (1943–1989), Belgian journalist
- Danny Hylton (born 1989), English footballer
- Danny Hynes, American air hockey player

=== I ===
- Danny Ildefonso (born 1976), Filipino basketball player
- Danny Imray (born 2003), English footballer
- Danny In 't Ven (born 1968), Belgian cyclist
- Danny Ings (born 1992), English football player
- Danny Invincible (born 1979), Australian soccer player
- Danny Ionescu (born 1976), Israeli-Romanian aquatic microbial ecologist
- Danny Ireland (born 1990), Australian soccer player
- Danny Irmen (born 1984), American ice hockey player
- Danny Isidora (born 1994), American football player

=== J ===
- Danny Jackman (born 1983), English footballer
- Danny Jacob (born 1956), American composer and guitarist
- Danny Javier (1947–2022), Filipino actor, singer and member of APO Hiking Society
- Danny Jay (born 1993), British film composer and music producer
- Danny Jennings (born 1949), Australian rules footballer
- Danny Joe (born 1929), Canadian politician
- Danny John-Jules (born 1960), British actor and dancer
- Danny Johnson (American football) (born 1995), American football player
- Danny Jonasson (born 1974), Danish cyclist
- Danny Jones, multiple people
- Danny Jordaan (born 1951), South African sportsperson-politician
- Danny Jung (born 1971), Danish footballer and manager

=== K ===
- Danny Kadar (born 1969), American record producer
- Danny Kah (born 1967), Australian speed skater
- Danny Kahneman (1934–2024), Israeli-American psychologist
- Danny Kalb (1942–2022), American blues guitarist
- Danny Kaleikini (1937–2023), American singer, musical artist and entertainer
- Danny Kaleopa (born 1966), Samoan rugby union player
- Danny Kallis (born 1957), American television writer and producer
- Danny Kamekona (1935–1996), American actor
- Danny Kanell (born 1973), American football player
- Danny Karbassiyoon (born 1984), American soccer player and scout
- Danny Kass (born 1982), American snowboarder
- Danny Kassap (1982–2011), Congolese-Canadian long-distance runner
- Danny Kastner, American musician
- Danny Kay (1935–2011), Australian rugby union international
- Danny Kaye (1911–1987), American actor, singer, dancer, and comedian
- Danny Keane (born 1951), New Zealand rower
- Danny Kedwell (born 1983), British footballer
- Danny Keenan, New Zealand historian and author
- Danny Kekana (born 1954), South African politician
- Danny Kelleher (1966–1995), English cricketer
- Danny Kent (born 1993), British motorcycle racer
- Danny Keogh (1948–2019), Ugandan-born South African actor
- Danny Kepley (born 1953), American gridiron football player
- Danny Kerry (born 1982), English cricketer
- Danny Key (born 1977), English footballer
- Danny Kight (born 1971), American football player
- Danny Killeen (1933–2017), American sailor
- Danny Kinahan (born 1958), Northern Irish politician
- Danny Kingad (born 1995), Filipino mixed martial arts fighter
- Danny Kingston (born 1973), British judoka
- Danny Kirmond (born 1985), English rugby league footballer
- Danny Kirrane, British actor
- Danny Kirwan (1950–2018), British rock musician
- Danny Kladis (1917–2009), American racing driver
- Danny Klassen (born 1975), Canadian baseball player
- Danny Knicely, American country and bluegrass musician
- Danny Koevermans (born 1978), Dutch footballer
- Danny König (born 1974), German football manager
- Danny Kopec (1954–2016), American-Canadian chess player
- Danny Kortchmar (born 1946), American musician
- Danny Krasnov (born 1970), Israeli pole vaulter
- Danny Kravitz (1930–2013), American baseball player
- Danny Kristo (born 1990), American professional ice hockey player
- Danny Kroes (born 1999), Dutch racing driver
- Danny Kruger (born 1974), British politician
- Danny Kurmann (born 1966), Swiss ice hockey official
- Danny Kushlick, British political activist
- Danny Kushmaro (born 1968), Israeli journalist
- Danny Kustow (1955–2019), English guitarist
- Danny Kyle (1939–1998), Scottish folk singer-songwriter

=== L ===
- Danny La Rue (1927–2009), Irish-British entertainer
- Danny Lacuna (1938–2023), Filipino lawyer and politician
- Danny Lamagna, American drummer
- Danny Lamb (born 1995), English cricketer
- Danny Lane (born 1955), American artist
- Danny Lange, Danish computer scientist
- Danny Langsdorf (born 1972), American football coach
- Danny Langtree (born 1991), English rugby union player
- Danny Lansanah (born 1985), American football player
- Danny LaPorte (born 1956), American motorcycle racer
- Danny Lasoski (born 1959), American sprint car racing driver
- Danny Latza (born 1989), German footballer
- Danny Lauby Jr. (born 1992), American darts player
- Danny Law (born 1975), English cricketer
- Danny Lawson (1947–2008), Canadian ice hockey player
- Danny Lazar (born 1943), American baseball player
- Danny Leclère, Belgian drug dealer
- Danny Lecours (born 1955), Canadian ice hockey player
- Danny Ledonne (born 1982), American film director
- Danny Lee, several people
- Danny Lehmann (born 1985), American baseball player
- Danny Leiner (1961–2018), American film and television director
- Danny Lenarduzzi (born 1959), Canadian soccer player
- Danny Lendich (1944–2025), New Zealand businessman
- Danny Lenie (born 1967), Belgian footballer
- Danny Lennon (born 1969), Scottish football manager
- Danny León (born 1994), Spanish skateboarder
- Danny Letner (1928–2018), American race car driver
- Danny Levan (born 1990), Bulgarian singer
- Danny Lewicki (1931–2018), Canadian ice hockey player
- Danny Leyva (born 2003), American professional soccer player
- Danny Liddell, Scottish footballer
- Danny Liddle (1912–1982), Scottish footballer
- Danny Light (1948–2014), English footballer
- Danny Lim (born 1975), Malaysian writer and photographer
- Danny Lim (activist), Australian activist and former politician
- Danny Lima (born 1975), Samoan rugby league footballer
- Danny Limelight (born 1991), American professional wrestler
- Danny Lipford (born 1957), American broadcaster
- Danny Lippens (born 1961), Belgian cyclist
- Danny Little Bear (1937–1991), American professional wrestler
- Danny Litwhiler (1916–2011), American baseball player
- Danny Livesey (born 1984), English footballer
- Danny Livingstone (1933–1988), English cricketer
- Danny Lockett (born 1964), American football player
- Danny Lockin (1943–1977), American actor and dancer
- Danny Logan (born 1997), American lacrosse player
- Danny Lohner (born 1970), American musician
- Danny Longman (born 1987), English ultra-endurance athlete
- Danny Lopes (born 1982), American actor and model
- Danny Lopez, multiple people
- Danny Lorenz (born 1969), Canadian ice hockey player
- Danny Lotz (1937–2015), American basketball player
- Danny Love, New Zealand former rugby union player
- Danny Lui (1957–2012), Hong Kong entrepreneur and venture capitalist
- Danny Lupano (born 2000), Belgian footballer
- Danny Luttrell, Irish Gaelic footballer
- Danny Lux (born 1969), American composer
- Danny Lyon (born 1942), American photographer and filmmaker

=== M ===
- Danny Mac (born 1988), English actor
- Danny MacAskill (born 1985), Scottish trials cyclist
- Danny MacFayden (1805–1972), American baseball player
- Danny MacGillivray, Canadian politician
- Danny Maciocia (born 1967), Canadian professional football coach
- Danny Madden, American R&B singer
- Danny Maddix (born 1967), Jamaican footballer
- Danny Magill, Gaelic footballer
- Danny Maguire (born 1989), English footballer
- Danny Majic, Croatian-American record producer
- Danny Makkelie (born 1983), Dutch football referee
- Danny Malboeuf, American painter
- Danny Males (born 1941), Australian boxer
- Danny Malin (born 1979), English YouTube personality
- Danny Malloy, multiple people
- Danny Malone (1909–1951), Irish tenor
- Danny Mandia (1954–2024), Filipino director
- Danny Mandroiu (born 1998), Irish footballer
- Danny Manning (born 1966), American basketball player and coach
- Danny Manu (born 1988), British entrepreneur
- Danny Markov (born 1976), Russian ice hockey player
- Danny Marshall (born 1952), American politician
- Danny Martiny (born 1951), American politician
- Danny Maseng, Israeli-born performer
- Danny Mason (born 1990), American gridiron football player
- Danny Masterson (born 1976), American actor
- Danny Masterton (1954–2020), Scottish footballer
- Danny Mathijssen (born 1983), Dutch footballer and manager
- Danny Mathis (born 1954), American politician
- Danny Matthys (born 1947), Flemish Belgian visual artist
- Danny Maun (born 1981), English rugby league footballer
- Danny Maye (born 1982), English footballer
- Danny Mayo (1950–1999), American songwriter
- Danny Mayor (born 1990), English footballer
- Danny McAlinden (1947–2021), Northern Irish boxer
- Danny McAllister, multiple people
- Danny McCormack (born 1972), English musician
- Danny McCormack (hurler), Irish hurler
- Danny McCray (born 1988), American football player
- Danny McCray (sprinter) (born 1974), American sprinter
- Danny McCulloch (1945–2015), British bassist
- Danny McDaid (born 1941), Irish Olympic athlete
- Danny McEvoy (born 1946), Australian cricketer
- Danny McGarvey (1919–1977), Scottish trade unionist
- Danny McGrain (born 1950), Scottish footballer and manager
- Danny McGrain (footballer, born 1953)
- Danny McGrath (born 2006), Irish footballer
- Danny McGuire (born 1982), English rugby league player
- Danny McKelvie (born 1969), Scottish rugby union player
- Danny McKelvie (footballer) (born 1980), Scottish footballer
- Danny McKnight (born 1951), American military officer
- Danny McLauchlan (born 1977), Australian cricketer
- Danny McLennan (1925–2004), Scottish footballer and manager
- Danny McManus (born 1965), American gridiron football player
- Danny McMullen (1906–1983), American football player
- Danny McNamara, multiple people
- Danny McNamee (born 1960), Northern Irish electronic engineer
- Danny McRorie (1906–1963), Scottish footballer
- Danny McShain (1912–1992), American professional wrestler
- Danny McWilliams (born 1956), American comedian
- Danny Meagher, multiple people
- Danny Meddings (born 1968), English squash player
- Danny Mefford (born 1982), American choreographer
- Danny Meiners (born 1979), German politician
- Danny van den Meiracker (born 1989), Dutch footballer
- Danny Mellanby (born 1979), English footballer
- Danny Mendick (born 1993), American baseball player
- Danny Menting (born 1990), Dutch footballer
- Danny Mercer, Colombian-American songwriter
- Danny Michael, American sound engineer
- Danny Michel (born 1970), Canadian songwriter and producer
- Danny Miles (born 1945), American multi-sport athlete
- Danny Miller (disambiguation), multiple people
- Danny Milosevic (born 1978), Australian soccer player
- Danny Minnick (born 1973), American painter and skateboarder
- Danny Miranda (born 1978), Cuban baseball player
- Danny Mitchley (born 1989), English footballer
- Danny Mixon (born 1949), American musician
- Danny Moeller (1885–1951), American baseball player
- Danny Moir (born 1980), Canadian ice dancer
- Danny Monico, American filmmaker
- Danny Morais (born 1985), Brazilian footballer
- Danny Moran, Filipino businessman and retired footballer
- Danny Morejón (1930–2009), Cuban baseball player
- Danny Morseu (born 1958), Australian basketball player
- Danny Morton (born 1973), Australian rules footballer
- Danny Mota (born 1975), Dominican baseball player
- Danny Moulis (born 1960), Australian soccer player
- Danny Mrwanda (born 1983), Tanzanian international footballer
- Danny Msiza, South African politician
- Danny Mueller (born 1966), American-born Puerto Rican footballer
- Danny Mulheron, New Zealand actor, writer and director
- Danny Muller (born 1969), Dutch footballer
- Danny de Munk (born 1970), Dutch actor
- Danny Muno (born 1989), American baseball player
- Danny Munyao (born 1987), Zambian footballer
- Danny Murnane (1925–2016), Australian rules footballer
- Danny Murtaugh (1917–1976), American baseball player and coach
- Danny Musovski (born 1995), American soccer player
- Danny Musser (1905–2000), American baseball player
- Danny Mwanga (born 1991), Congolese-American soccer player

=== N ===
- Danny Nadeau (born 1965), American politician
- Danny Naisbitt (born 1978), English footballer
- Danny Nalliah, Australian pastor
- Danny Namaso (born 2000), Cameroonian international football player
- Danny Napoleon (1942–2003), American baseball player
- Danny Nardico (1925–2010), American boxer and wrestler
- Danny Hilman Natawidjaja, Indonesian geologist
- Danny Naughton (1924–1992), English rugby league footballer
- Danny Neaverth (born 1938), American disc jockey
- Danny Nee (born 1945), American basketball player and coach
- Danny Needham (1867–1922), American boxer
- Danny Nelissen (born 1970), Dutch cyclist
- Danny Nettey (1968–2016), Ghanaian gospel musician
- Danny Neuman (born 1955), Israeli footballer
- Danny Neville, American college basketball coach
- Danny Newall (1921–1997), Welsh footballer
- Danny Mansoni Ngombo (born 1963), Congolese footballer
- Danny Lam Nguyen (born 1979), American judge
- Danny Nguyen, Vietnamese-American poker player
- Danny Nicklas (born 1991), English rugby league footballer
- Danny Nightingale, multiple people
- Danny Nir'on (born 1971), Israeli footballer
- Danny Nix Jr. (born 1977), American real estate broker
- Danny Noonan, multiple people
- Danny Noppert (born 1990), Dutch darts player
- Danny North (born 1987), English footballer
- Danny Nucci (born 1968), American actor
- Danny Nugent, Irish Gaelic football player
- Danny Nutley (born 1974), Australian rugby league footballer
- Danny Nutt (born 1961), American football player
- Danny Nykoluk (1933–2016), Canadian professional footballer

=== O ===
- Danny O'Brien, multiple people
- Danny O'Bryant, American tennis player
- Danny O'Carroll (born 1983), Irish actor and producer
- Danny O'Dea (1911–2003), English actor
- Danny O'Flaherty (born 1951), Irish musician and storyteller
- Danny O'Hagan (born 1976), English footballer
- Danny O'Hanlon, Irish hurler
- Danny O'Hare, Irish academic leader and former university leader
- Danny O'Neil (American football), American football player
- Danny O'Neil (born 1971), American football player
- Danny O'Quinn Jr. (born 1985), American racing driver
- Danny O'Regan (born 1994), American ice hockey player
- Danny Ocean (born 1992), Venezuelan singer, songwriter and record producer
- Danny Okoye (born 2004), American football player
- Danny Olifant (1956–2012), South African politician and former trade unionist
- Danny Olsen (born 1985), Danish footballer
- Danny Ongais (1942–2022), American racing driver
- Danny Opatoshu, American screenwriter
- Danny Oquendo (born 1987), American football player
- Danny Orleans (born 1954), American magician
- Danny Orr (born 1978), English rugby league footballer and coach
- Danny Osorio (born 1988), Colombian cyclist
- Danny Overbea (1926–1994), American R&B singer, guitarist and songwriter
- Danny Owens, Irish hurler
- Danny Ozark (1923–2009), American baseball coach

=== P ===
- Danny Padilla (born 1951), American bodybuilder
- Danny Pang, multiple people
- Danny Pardo (born 1971), Argentinian actor
- Danny Parkins (born 1986), American sportswriter, sports radio talk show host and podcaster
- Danny Pate (born 1979), American racing cyclist
- Danny Paton (1936–2011), Scottish footballer
- Danny Paul (born 1986), English rugby union footballer
- Danny Payne (1957–2005), American soccer player
- Danny Pearman (born 1965), American football player and coach
- Danny Pearson, multiple people
- Danny Peary (born 1949), American film critic and sports writer
- Danny Pedraza (born 1994), Bolivian footballer
- Danny Peebles (born 1966), American football player
- Danny Pellegrino, American podcaster, writer, author and actor
- Danny Pena (born 1968), American soccer player
- Danny Peyronel (born 1953), British singer
- Danny Philip (born 1953), Prime Minister of Solomon Islands
- Danny Philliskirk (born 1991), English footballer
- Danny Phiri (born 1989), Zimbabwean footballer
- Danny Pierce, multiple people
- Danny Pieters (born 1956), Belgian politician
- Danny Pilkington (born 1990), English footballer
- Danny Pino (born 1974), American actor
- Danny Pintauro (born 1976), American actor and film producer
- Danny Pinter (born 1996), American football player
- Danny Pippen (born 1997), American basketball player
- Danny Pittman (born 1958), American football player
- Danny Plett, Canadian musician, songwriter and music producer
- D. T. Pollard, American novelist
- Danny Polo (1901–1949), American jazz clarinetist
- Danny van Poppel (born 1993), Dutch cyclist
- Danny Porte (born 1975), English rugby union player
- Danny Porush (born 1957), American businessman
- Danny Post (born 1989), Dutch footballer
- Danny Potter (born 1979), English footballer
- Danny Powell (1922–2013), Australian rules footballer
- Danny Power (born 1956), Canadian handball player
- Danny Preda (born 1987), Israeli footballer
- Danny Price, multiple people
- Danny Dereck Prince (born 1986), Indian cricketer
- Danny Prosser, British lawn bowler
- Danny Pudi (born 1979), American actor and director
- Danny Pugh (born 1982), English football player and coach
- Danny Putnam (born 1982), American baseball player

=== Q ===
- Danny Quah (born 1958), economist
- Danny Qualter (born 1992), Irish rugby union player
- Danny Quartermaine (born 1997), English boxer
- Danny Quendambú (born 1983), Colombian footballer

=== R ===
- Danny Racchi (born 1987), English footballer
- Danny Raco (born 1979), Australian actor and director
- Danny Rader (born 1981), American musician
- Danny Ragsdale (born 1977), American football player
- Danny Rahim (born 1986), British actor
- Danny Ramadan (born 1984), Syrian-Canadian novelist, public speaker and LGBTQ-refugee activist
- Danny Ramirez, American baseball coach
- Danny Ramnarais (born 1964), Canadian cricketer
- Danny Rampey, American politician
- Danny Rampling (born 1961), British DJ
- Danny Rapp (1941–1983), American singer
- Danny Ray, multiple people
- Danny Raz, Israeli computer scientist and professor
- Danny Red (born 1967), British Jamaican reggae musician
- Danny Reddin (1914–1976), Irish basketball player
- Danny van der Ree (born 1988), Dutch footballer
- Danny Reece (born 1955), American football player
- Danny Reet (born 1987), English footballer
- Danny Reible, American engineer
- Danny Reisch, American music producer
- Danny Reuther (born 1988), German footballer
- Danny Rich, multiple people
- Danny Richar (born 1983), Dominican baseball player
- Danny Richmond (born 1984), American ice hockey player
- Danny Rimer, Canadian businessman
- Danny Rivera (born 1945), Puerto Rican singer
- Danny Roach (born 1982), Australian rules footballer
- Danny Robas (born 1957), Israeli pop-rock singer and songwriter
- Danny Roberts, multiple people
- Danny Robins, English writer
- Danny Robles (born 2002), American soccer player
- Danny Rocco (born 1960), American football player and coach
- Danny Roelandt (born 1955), Belgian sprinter
- Danny Roew, American music video and film director
- Danny Röhl (born 1989), German footballer and coach
- Danny Rolling (1952–2006), American serial killer
- Danny Rombley (born 1979), Dutch baseball player
- Danny Romero, multiple people
- Danny Rose (disambiguation), multiple people
- Danny van Rossem (1935–2025), Dutch fencer
- Danny Rozin, Israeli-American artist
- Danny Rubin, American screenwriter and playwright
- Danny Rubin (basketball) (born 1991), American basketball player
- Danny Rubinstein, Israeli journalist
- Danny Rumph (1983–2005), American college basketball player
- Danny Russo (1885–1956), American violinist, songwriter and big band leader
- Danny Rutigliano, American actor

=== S ===
- Danny Sabatello (born 1993), American mixed martial artist
- Danny Saber, American musician
- Danny Sage (born 1965), American singer, songwriter and musician
- Danny Saida (born 1959), Israeli politician
- Danny Salazar (born 1990), Dominican baseball player
- Danny Salisbury (born 1957), American basketball player
- Danny Saltz (born 1961), American tennis player
- Danny Sammons (born 1984), American racing driver
- Danny Sanderson (born 1950), Israeli musical artist
- Danny Sands (born 1962), American doctor
- Danny Santana (born 1990), Dominican baseball player
- Danny Santiago (born 1973), American boxer
- Danny Santoya (born 1988), Colombian footballer
- Danny Sapani (born 1970), British actor
- Danny Sapsford (born 1969), British tennis player
- Danny Saucedo (born 1986), Swedish pop/dance-singer
- Danny Sauter, American politician
- Danny Schayes (born 1959), American basketball player, son of Dolph Schayes
- Danny Schechter (1942–2015), American television producer
- Danny Schell (1927–1972), American baseball player
- Danny Schenkel (born 1978), Dutch footballer
- Danny Schmitz (born 1955), American baseball coach
- Danny Schock (1948–2017), Canadian ice hockey player
- Danny Schofield (born 1980), English footballer
- Danny Schoobaert (born 1960), Belgian cyclist
- Danny Schreurs (born 1987), Dutch footballer
- Danny Schwarz (born 1975), German footballer
- Danny Schwarz (model) (born 1986), British model
- Danny Scudero, American football player
- Danny Sculthorpe (born 1979), English rugby league footballer
- Danny Seaborne (born 1987), English footballer
- Danny Seagren (1943–2025), American actor and puppeteer
- Danny Seemiller (born 1954), American table tennis player
- Danny Seigle (born 1976), Filipino-American basketball player
- Danny Sembello (1963–2015), American musician
- Danny Senda (born 1981), English footballer
- Danny Seraphine (born 1948), American drummer
- Danny Sérgio (born 1978), Brazilian football manager
- Danny Vargas Serrano (born 1979), member of the Legislative Assembly of Costa Rica
- Danny Setiawan (born 1945), Indonesian politician and civil servant
- Danny Seward, British television actor and singer-songwriter
- Danny Sewell (1930–2001), British boxer and actor
- Danny Shanahan (1956–2021), American cartoonist
- Danny Shay (1876–1927), American baseball player
- Danny Sheaffer (born 1961), American baseball player
- Danny Shelley (born 1990), English footballer
- Danny Shelton (born 1993), American football player
- Danny Shepherd (born 1960), Australian rugby league footballer
- Danny Sheridan (1950–2016), American songwriter
- Danny Shirley (born 1956), American country music singer
- Danny Shittu (born 1980), Nigerian association football player
- Danny Shone (1899–1974), English footballer
- Danny Shouse (born 1958), American basketball player
- Danny Sidak, Bangladeshi film actor
- Danny Siegel (born 1943), American Jewish fundraiser and writer
- Danny Sillada (born 1963), Filipino artist, writer and musician
- Danny Simmonds (born 1974), English footballer
- Danny Simon (1918–2005), American screenwriter
- Danny Sjöberg-Augustsson (born 1958), Swedish handball player
- Danny Sleath (born 1986), English association footballer
- Danny Smick (1915–1975), American basketball player
- Danny Smith, multiple people
- Danny Smythe (1948–2016), American drummer
- Danny Snell (born 1953), American racing driver
- Danny Sonner (born 1972), English-born Northern Irish footballer
- Danny Soucy, Canadian politician
- Danny Soufi (born 2003), American racing driver
- Danny Southwick (born 1981), American football player
- Danny Southworth (born 1999), Welsh rugby player
- Danny Spanos, American drummer
- Danny Spiller (born 1981), English footballer
- Danny Spradlin (born 1959), American football player
- Danny Sprinkle (born 1976), American basketball coach
- Danny Stack, Irish screenwriter and film director
- Danny Stag, American musician
- Danny Stam (born 1972), Dutch racing cyclist
- Danny Stanley (born 1988), Australian rules footballer
- Danny Staples (1932–2002), American politician
- Danny Stassar (born 1997), Dutch footballer
- Danny Steel (1884–1931), Scottish footballer
- Danny Steele (born 1982), English footballer
- Danny Steinmann (1942–2012), American film director
- Danny Sterling (born 1956), American politician
- Danny Stiles (1923–2011), American radio personality
- Danny Stone (born 1982), English footballer
- Danny Strack (born 1979), American poet
- Danny Street (1941–2010), Scottish singer
- Danny Striggow (born 2002), American football player
- Danny Stron (born 1974), American actor, screenwriter, director, and producer
- Danny Stutsman (born 2003), American football player
- Danny Sugerman (1954–2005), manager of The Doors
- Danny Summers (1924–1999), Canadian ice hockey player
- Danny Supa, American skateboarder
- Danny Sutcliffe (born 1992), Irish hurler
- Danny Sveinson, Canadian guitarist
- Danny Swailes (born 1979), English footballer
- Danny Swanson (born 1986), Scottish footballer
- Danny Syvret (born 1985), Canadian ice hockey player
- Danny Szetela (born 1987), American soccer player

=== T ===
- Danny Taberner (born 1993), English footballer
- Danny Tabor, American politician
- Danny Talbott (1944–2020), American sportsman
- Danny Tamberelli (born 1982), American actor and musician
- Danny Tan (born 1959), Filipino musician
- Danny Tarkanian (born 1961), American politician
- Danny Tartabull (born 1962), Puerto Rican baseball player
- Danny Tate (born 1955), American songwriter
- Danny Téllez (born 1974), Nicaraguan footballer
- Danny Templeton, Scottish footballer
- Danny Tenaglia (born 1961), Italian American DJ and record producer
- Danny Tenenbaum, American politician
- Danny Tenorio (born 1992), Ecuadorian football player
- Danny Thomas, multiple people
- Danny Thomson (born 1991), Scottish footballer
- Danny Thorpe (died 2021), American programmer
- Danny Tiatto (born 1973), Australian soccer player
- Danny Tickle (born 1983), English rugby league footballer
- Danny Tidwell (1984–2020), American dancer
- Danny Toala (born 1999), New Zealand rugby union player
- Danny Toner, Irish hurler
- Danny Torgersen, American musician, vocalist and trumpeter
- Danny Townsend (born 1977), Australian sports administrator, businessman and CEO
- Danny Trainor (1944–1974), Northern Irish footballer
- Danny Trejo (born 1944), American actor
- Danny Trejo (soccer) (born 1998), Mexican footballer
- Danny Trevathan (born 1990), American football player
- Danny van Trijp (born 1996), Dutch darts player
- Danny Troob (born 1949), American arranger and orchestrator
- Danny Tudhope (born 1985), Scottish jockey
- Danny Tull (born 1977), English director and film editor
- Danny Tusitala (born 1991), Samoan rugby union player
- Danny van der Tuuk (born 1999), Dutch cyclist

=== U ===
- Danny Uchechi (born 1989), Nigerian footballer

=== V ===
- Danny Vaca (born 1990), Ecuadorian footballer
- Danny Valencia (born 1984), American major league baseball third baseman (Minnesota Twins)
- Danny Van Haute (born 1956), American cyclist
- Danny Vasquez (born 1985), American soccer player
- Danny Vaughn (born 1961), American singer
- Danny Vaughn (soccer) (born 1956), American soccer player
- Danny Venter (born 1987), South African soccer player
- Danny Ventre (born 1986), English footballer
- Danny Vera, multiple people
- Danny Verbeek (born 1990), Dutch footballer
- Danny Verdin (born 1964), American politician
- Danny Verity (born 1980), English footballer
- Danny Verpaele (born 1985), American football player
- Danny Villa (born 1964), American football player
- Danny Villanueva (1937–2015), American football player
- Danny Vinson (born 1954), American character actor
- Danny Vitale (born 1993), American football player
- Danny Vitiello (born 1996), American soccer player
- Danny Vranes (born 1958), American basketball player
- Danny Vukovic (born 1985), Australian former professional soccer player

=== W ===
- Danny Walker (born 1999), English rugby league footballer
- Danny Walker (golfer) (born 1995), American golfer
- Danny Walker-Rice (born 2000), English footballer
- Danny Wallace (footballer) (born 1964), English footballer
- Danny Wallace (humorist) (born 1976), British author and television presenter
- Danny Waltman (born 1981), American soccer player
- Danny Walton (1947–2017), American baseball player
- Danny Ward (footballer, born 1993), Welsh football player
- Danny Warden (born 1973), English footballer
- Danny Warr (1905–1972), Australian rules footballer and coach
- Danny Warrender (born 1986), English footballer
- Danny Washbrook (born 1985), English rugby league footballer
- Danny Watson, American politician
- Danny Watson (broadcaster) (1950s-–2026), New Zealand radio and television host
- Danny Way (born 1974), American professional skateboarder
- Danny Webb (disambiguation), multiple people
- Danny Weidler, Australian sports reporter
- Danny Weinberg (1928–1988), American race car driver
- Danny Weinkauf (born 1963), American musician
- Danny Weis (born 1948), American guitarist
- Danny Welbeck (born 1990), English professional footballer
- Danny Westwood (born 1953), English footballer
- Danny Wheelahan (1903–1991), Australian rules footballer
- Danny Wheeler, British DJ
- Danny Whitaker (born 1980), English footballer
- Danny Whitehall (born 1995), English footballer
- Danny Whitehead (born 1993), English footballer
- Danny Whitten (1943–1972), American guitarist
- Danny Wicks (born 1985), Australian rugby league footballer
- Danny Widdicombe, Australian musician
- Danny Wilde (born 1956), member of the band The Rembrandts
- Danny Willett (born 1987), English professional golfer
- Danny Williams, several people
- Danny Wimprine (born 1981), American gridiron football player
- Danny Winchell (1926–2011), American musical artist
- Danny Winter (1918–2004), Welsh footballer
- Danny Wintjens (born 1983), Dutch footballer
- Danny Wirtz, American businessman
- Danny Wiseman (born 1967), American ten-pin bowler
- Danny Wood (born 1969), American singer, New Kids on the Block
- Danny Woodards (born 1983), English footballer
- Danny Woodburn (born 1964), American actor, comedian, and activist for the disability rights
- Danny Woodhead (born 1985), American football player
- Danny Woods (1942–2018), American singer, member of the group Chairmen of the Board
- Danny Worsnop (born 1990), English singer
- Danny Worth (born 1985), American baseball player
- Danny Wright, multiple people
- Danny Wring (born 1986), English footballer
- Danny Wu (born 1996), Canadian director and writer
- Danny Wuerffel (born 1974), American football player
- Danny Wylde (born 1985), American pornographic actor
- Danny Wynn (born 1983), American soccer player
- Danny Lee Wynter (born 1982), British actor, playwright and activist

=== Y ===
- Danny Yamashiro (born 1967), American author, lecturer, chaplain, researcher, clergyman and podcast host
- Danny Yatom (born 1945), Israeli politician
- Danny Yeo, Singaporean media personality
- Danny Yeo (swimmer) (born 1990), Singaporean swimmer
- Danny Young (disambiguation), multiple people
- Danny Yung (born 1943), Hong Kong artist

=== Z ===
- Danny Zappin, American businessman
- Danny Zialcita (1939–2013), Filipino filmmaker
- Danny Zuker (born 1964), American television writer

== Stage name ==
- Danny (footballer) (born 1983), Portuguese footballer, Daniel Miguel Alves Gomes
- Danny!, stage name of American recording artist and producer Danny Swain
- Danny, stage name of Finnish singer Ilkka Lipsanen
- Danny, Daniel Murillo, lead vocalist of the band Hollywood Undead and formerly Lorene Drive
- Danny Brown, stage name of Daniel Dewan Sewell, American rapper
- Danny Romero, stage name of Daniel Ramírez Romero, Spanish singer
- Danny Saucedo, aka "Danny", Swedish singer
- Danny Sexbang, stage name of Leigh Daniel Avidan, singer of musical comedy duo, Ninja Sex Party

== Fictional characters ==
- Danny Baker (character), in the comedy TV show 30 Rock
- Danny Baldwin, in the British soap opera Coronation Street
- Danny Burke, a character in the 1984 American teen sex comedy movie Revenge of the Nerds
- Danny Collins, in the film of the same name
- Danny Dallas, in TV series Soap
- Danny Dog, in Peppa Pig
- Danny Fatfuck, in the Adult Swim television pilot Paid Programming
- Danny Madigan, played by Austin O'Brien in the 1993 American fantasy meta action comedy movie Last Action Hero
- Danny Messer, in the TV crime drama CSI: NY
- Danny Mitchell (EastEnders), in the British soap opera EastEnders
- Danny Moon, in the British soap opera EastEnders
- Danny Noonan, the main protagonist in the movie Caddyshack
- Danny O'Neil, in the 1988 movie 14 Going on 30
- Danny Pennington, a character in the 1990 live-action film adaptation of Teenage Mutant Ninja Turtles
- Danny Phantom (character), alter-ego of Daniel "Danny" Fenton and the title character of the Nickelodeon cartoon series Danny Phantom
- Danny Pink, in Doctor Who
- Danny Rand, also known as Iron Fist, a Marvel superhero
- Danny Rebus, from the TV series The Electric Company
- Danny Rayburn, in the Netflix series Bloodline
- Danny Tanner, in the TV sitcom Full House
- Danny Taylor, in the TV crime drama Without a Trace
- Danny the Street, a living, sentient street of DC Comics' Doom Patrol
- Danny Thornill, in the film Cyberbully
- Danny "Daniel platypus", a character of the platypus brothers in the 1990s American animated television series Taz-Mania
- Danny Torrance, in the 1977 novel The Shining
- Danny Van Zandt, in Degrassi: The Next Generation
- Danny Walker, in the 2001 film Pearl Harbor
- Danny Wheeler, a main character in the American sitcom Baby Daddy
- Danny "Danno" Williams, in the 1968–1980 television series Hawaii Five-O
  - Danny "Danno" Williams, in the 2010 remake series Hawaii Five-0
- Danny Williams, in the TV series My Little Pony
- Danny Zuko, in the musical Grease
- Danny, a character from the 1984 film Jagir
- Danny, the main male orange cat in the film Cats Don't Dance
- Danny, in the Just! series of short story collections by Australian author Andy Griffiths
- Danny, nickname of Mrs. Danvers, the main antagonist of Daphne du Maurier's 1938 novel Rebecca
- Danny, in the anime Sonic X
- Danny, the leader of The Bash Street Kids from the British comic The Beano
- Danny, in the martial arts action thriller Unleashed
- Danny, title character in the 2016 song cycle The Seven Doors of Danny
- Danny (Paw Patrol), a recurring character in Paw Patrol
- Danny, title character in the 1975 children's novel Danny, Champion of the World
- Danny, a character in the American 2001 thriller movie Good Neighbor
- Danny, in the 2002 animated film Return to Never Land
- Danny, in the 2005 American science fiction adventure Zathura: A Space Adventure
- Danny, in the 2012 American horror film Sloppy the Psychotic
- Danny, in the 2017 animated television series Adventure Time episode "Ring of Fire"
- Danny Douglas, in the 2016 animated television series Future-Worm!

== See also ==
- Dan (disambiguation)
- Daniel (disambiguation)
- Dany (disambiguation)
