= Webicina =

- Company type: Private
- Founded: 2008
- Headquarters: Budapest, Hungary
- Key people: Bertalan Mesko
- Website: http://www.webicina.com]

Webicina is a web-based company founded in 2008 by Bertalan Meskó. Based in Budapest, Hungary, Webicina curates the medical resources of social media either for medical professionals and e-patients.

Webicina has been acknowledged by international bodies such as the World Health Organization and Al Jazeera as providing the latest medical news and articles in one personalized place in 19 languages.

Webicina launched the world's first free online course, The Social MEDia Course, focusing on social media and medicine with 16 prezis, tests and badges.

== Awards and Prizes ==
Webicina's mobile application won the Most Innovative App Award in 2011.

Additionally, the company won a prize at the Social Innovation Tournament organized by the European Investment Bank in Luxembourg on 29 November 2012.
