= The Winning Hand =

Compilation album by Kris Kristofferson, Willie Nelson, Dolly Parton and Brenda Lee
- Released: November 1, 1982
- Recorded: 1964–1982
- Studio: Sound Emporium, Nashville; Young 'Un Sound, Nashville; Fred Foster Sound Studio, Nashville; Caribou Ranch, Nederland, Colorado; Pedernales Recording, Spicewood, Texas
- Genre: Country
- Length: 59:55
- Label: Monument
- Producer: Fred Foster

Kris Kristofferson chronology
To the Bone (1981)	The Winning Hand (1982)	Music from Songwriter (1984)

Willie Nelson chronology
Always on My Mind (1982)	The Winning Hand (1982)	Tougher Than Leather (1983)

Dolly Parton chronology
Greatest Hits (1982)	The Winning Hand (1982)	Burlap & Satin (1983)

Brenda Lee chronology
Only When I Laugh (1981)	The Winning Hand (1982)	Feels So Right (1985)

Singles from The Winning Hand
- 1. "Everything's Beautiful (In Its Own Way)" Released: November 8, 1982; 2. "You're Gonna Love Yourself in the Morning" Released: March 14, 1983

The Winning Hand is a collaborative compilation album by Kris Kristofferson, Willie Nelson, Dolly Parton and Brenda Lee. It was released on November 1, 1982, by Monument Records. The double album was produced by Fred Foster, founder and chairman of the board of Monument, and contains some newly-recorded material as well as catalog material with new instrumental tracks. The album spawned two singles, the Parton and Nelson duet "Everything's Beautiful (In Its Own Way)" and "You're Gonna Love Yourself in the Morning" by Lee and Nelson. The album also inspired a television special of the same name hosted by Johnny Cash, who had written the album's liner notes. The special featuring all four performers aired in over 150 markets in March and April 1985.

== Release and promotion ==
The album was announced in the September 4, 1982 issue of Billboard as the first release by Monument Records through a new distribution deal with CBS.

The album was released on November 1, 1982. Monument Records launched a major radio, retail and advertising campaign budgeted at $100,000 to carry the album to country, pop and adult contemporary audiences. The album's cover art depicts the four artists as kings and queens on a deck of cards. This artwork was utilized on posters, promotional decks of cards and other point-of-sale materials spotlighting the album's theme. Monument printed approximately 5,000 decks of promotional "Winning Hand" cards, with Nelson and Kristofferson as the kings, Lee and Parton as the queens. They were sent to pop, adult contemporary and country radio stations and a limited quantity was sent to retail locations nationally. Two weekends in November 1982 were designated as "Winning Hand Weekends" at key radio stations, including more than 60 country stations. The participating stations received 25 copies of the album and first single for giveaways. Additionally, Monument used the album's cover graphics to make a series of four-color 12-by-24-inch posters. Each poster was limited to 3,500 copies against red, green or blue backgrounds for in-store display. Along with the posters, retailers received promotional flats of the album with easel backs for display, and an eight track "mini LP" with four duet and four solo tracks from the album to be played in-store. CBS distribution also coordinated a series of retail contests to run from December 1982 to January 1983. Winners won an expense-paid trip to see any act of their choice from The Winning Hand album in concert in Las Vegas, Lake Tahoe or Atlantic City.

=== Television special ===
After writing the liner notes for the album, Johnny Cash suggested that the album be made into a television special with him as the host. Foster, Kristofferson, Nelson, Lee and Parton immediately agreed to both of Cash's suggestions, but it took a couple of years to arrange the schedules of these five superstars for the special to become a reality. The special includes every cut from the album in addition to some "signature songs" by each performer. Foster stated that he was humbled that the artists involved were participating in the special for a nominal fee in tribute to him. He went on to say that there wasn't enough money around or a sponsor able to pay for it otherwise. The special aired in over 150 markets in March and April 1985.

== Critical reception ==
Professional ratings
Review scores
Source	Rating
AllMusic	3/5 stars
Christgau's Record Guide	B−
The Encyclopedia of Popular Music	3/5 stars

Billboard published a review in the November 13, 1982, issue which said, "From the ultra-visual packaging to the liner insert penned by Johnny Cash, this is an engaging project involving three former Monument artists and one currently signed to the reactivated label (Kristofferson). The ambitiousness of the undertaking overrides some uneven spots, which can be expected when you're pairing different superstars on nearly every track of a double-record set. Best cuts include "You Left Me a Long, Long Time Ago" by Nelson and Lee, "To Make a Long Story Short, She's Gone" by Nelson and Kristofferson, and "Put It Off Until Tomorrow" by Parton and Kristofferson."

The review published in the November 13, 1982, issue of Cashbox said, "This is the ace that Fred Foster has been saving to play once Monument finalized its distribution agreement with CBS, and the LP is worth the wait, providing an assortment of duets and solo efforts made possible by adding recently-recorded tracks to existing material from the Monument vaults. Though the combination of this fearsome foursome is in itself a strong suit, the two-record set is enhanced by inspired cover art and thoughtful liner notes by Johnny Cash."

== Commercial performance ==
The album peaked at No. 4 on the US Billboard Hot Country LPs chart and No. 109 on the US Billboard Top LPs & Tape chart.

The album's first single, "Everything's Beautiful (In Its Own Way)", a duet by Parton and Nelson, was released in November 1982. It peaked at No. 7 on the US Billboard Hot Country Singles chart, No. 19 on the US Billboard Adult Contemporary Singles chart, and No. 102 on the US Billboard Bubbling Under the Hot 100 chart.

"You're Gonna Love Yourself in the Morning", a duet by Lee and Nelson, was released as the album's second single in March 1983. It peaked at No. 43 on the US Billboard Hot Country Singles chart.

== Track listing ==
Side one
No.	Title	Writer(s)	Performer(s)	Length
1.	"You're Gonna Love Yourself in the Morning"	Donnie Fritts	Brenda Lee; Willie Nelson	2:54
2.	"Ping Pong"	Boudleaux Bryant	Dolly Parton; Kris Kristofferson	2:18
3.	"You'll Always Have Someone"	Willie Nelson; Hank Cochran	Willie Nelson	2:56
4.	"Here Comes the Rainbow Again"	Kris Kristofferson	Kris Kristofferson	2:51
5.	"The Bigger the Fool, the Harder the Fall"	Kristofferson; Mike Utley; Stephen Bruton	Kris Kristofferson; Brenda Lee	3:40

Side two
No.	Title	Writer(s)	Performer(s)	Length
1.	"Help Me Make It Through the Night"	Kristofferson	Kris Kristofferson; Brenda Lee	3:46
2.	"Happy, Happy Birthday, Baby"	Margo Sylvia; Gilbert Lopez	Dolly Parton; Willie Nelson	2:28
3.	"You Left Me a Long, Long Time Ago"	Nelson	Willie Nelson; Brenda Lee	2:46
4.	"To Make a Long Story Short, She's Gone"	Nelson; Fred Foster	Willie Nelson; Kris Kristofferson	3:04
5.	"Someone Loves You, Honey"	Don Devaney	Brenda Lee	2:51

Side three
No.	Title	Writer(s)	Performer(s)	Length
1.	"Everything's Beautiful (In Its Own Way)"	Dolly Parton	Dolly Parton; Willie Nelson	3:13
2.	"Bring On the Sunshine"	Danny Epps	Brenda Lee	2:58
3.	"Put It Off Until Tomorrow"	Parton; Bill Owens	Dolly Parton; Kris Kristofferson	2:24
4.	"I Never Cared for You"	Nelson	Willie Nelson	2:21
5.	"Casey's Last Ride"	Kristofferson	Kris Kristofferson; Willie Nelson	4:06

Side four
No.	Title	Writer(s)	Performer(s)	Length
1.	"King of a Lonely Castle"	Kenny Devine	Willie Nelson	3:17
2.	"The Little Things"	Parton	Dolly Parton	2:32
3.	"The Bandits of Beverly Hills"	Kristofferson	Kris Kristofferson	2:33
4.	"What Do You Think About Lovin'"	Parton; Bill Owens	Dolly Parton; Brenda Lee	2:38
5.	"Born to Love Me"	Bob Morrison	Brenda Lee; Kris Kristofferson	4:19

== Charts ==
Album

Charts (1982–1983)	Peak positions
US Hot Country LPs (Billboard)	4
US Top LPs & Tape (Billboard)	109

Singles

Title	Year	Peak chart positions		
Title	Year	US Bubbling	US AC	US Country
"Everything's Beautiful (In Its Own Way)" (Dolly Parton and Willie Nelson)	1982	102	19	7
"You're Gonna Love Yourself in the Morning" (Brenda Lee and Willie Nelson)	1983	—	—	43
