= Fraticelli (disambiguation) =

Fraticelli may refer to:

- Fraticelli (surname), Italian surname
- Fraticelli, spiritual Franciscans
- Fraticelli of Monte Malbe, religious order from the 14th century
