= Fraticelli (surname) =

Fraticelli is an Italian surname, meaning little friar. Outside of Italy, the surname is most prevalent in Puerto Rico and the U.S.

Notable people with this surname include:

- Migdalia Fraticelli (born 1950), Puerto Rican judge, author, professor
- Danny Fraticelli (born 1977), Puerto Rican singer
- Franco Fraticelli (1928–2012), Italian film editor
- Luis S. Fraticelli (born 1961), Puerto Rican FBI agent
