= Thomas William Ferguson =

American writer

Thomas William "Tom" Ferguson (July 8, 1943 – April 14, 2006) was an American medical doctor, educator, and author. He was an early advocate for patient empowerment, urging patients to educate themselves, to assume control of their own health care, and to use the Internet as a way of accomplishing those goals.

== Personal life, education, and career ==
He was born in Ross, California and grew up in Coos Bay, Oregon. He eventually settled in Austin, Texas, hometown of his wife Meredith Mitchell Dreiss. He obtained a bachelor's degree from Reed College in Portland, Oregon and a master's degree in creative writing from San Francisco State University. He then went to Yale University School of Medicine, graduating in 1977 with an M.D. degree. However, he never had a medical practice. Instead he became a prolific writer about patients as medical consumers and about the doctor-patient relationship, "arguing that informed self-care was a jumping-off point for better health and made for a richer, fairer, if nontraditional, partnership between physicians and their patients." He studied and wrote about the empowered medical consumer beginning in 1975, and about online health resources for consumers beginning in 1987. "He urged patients to educate themselves and share knowledge with one another, and urged doctors to collaborate with patients rather than command them. Predicting the Internet's potential for disseminating medical information long before it became a familiar conduit, he was an early proponent of its use, terming laymen who did so 'E-Patients'." He researched and promoted the popular use of electronic resources including the Internet to gather information and cope with medical conditions. In 1993 he organized the world's first conference devoted to computer systems designed for medical consumers.

== Ferguson Awards ==
In 2002 he gave some "distinguished achievement awards" to leading individuals and organizations in the emerging area of "e-patients" and participatory medicine:

- Gunther Eysenbach as "one of the most productive researchers, editors, and publishers in the online health field.", citing Eysenbach's research work as well as his publishing the Journal of Medical Internet Research (jmir.org) as "the only peer-reviewed electronic e-health journal indexed by MEDLINE".
- Susannah Fox, then Director of Research at the Pew Internet & American Life Project.
- Pediatrician Alan Greene and his wife Cheryl Greene
- Gary Kreps, a distinguished communications scholar and educator, and a prolific author and editor
- Harrison "Lee" Rainie, then Director of the Pew Internet & American Life Project
- Internist and online health specialist Danny Sands, at Harvard's Center for Clinical Computing and Boston's CareGroup Healthcare System,

== Academic appointments ==
- Senior associate at Harvard's Center for Clinical Computing, Boston, Massachusetts
- Adjunct associate professor of health informatics at The University of Texas Health Science Center at Houston
- Adjunct faculty member at the University of Arkansas for Medical Sciences Medical Center, Little Rock, Arkansas
- Senior research fellow at the Pew Research Center Internet & American Life Project

== Partial list of publications ==
- Founder and editor of the magazine Medical Self Care, 1975 to 1989
- Health and medical editor for the Whole Earth Catalog
- The Ferguson Report, a consumer health informatics newsletter
- The Political Economy of Knowledge and the Changing Politics of the Philosophy of Science.
- Medical Self-Care: Access to Health Tools, edited by Tom Ferguson (Summit Books, 1980)
- The People's Book of Medical Tests, by David S. Sobel and Tom Ferguson (Summit Books, 1985)
- The No-Nag, No-Guilt, Do-It-Your-Own-Way Guide to Quitting Smoking, by Tom Ferguson (Ballantyne Books, 1988)
- Health Online: How To Find Health Information, Support Groups, And Self Help Communities In Cyberspace, by Tom Ferguson (Da Capo Press, 1996)

== Illness and death ==
He exemplified his own philosophy when he was diagnosed with multiple myeloma in 1991. "He relentlessly pursued strategies for both self-care and the newest research and experimental practices for controlling this aggressive cancer ... Between relapses and debilitating treatments, he led a migration of medical consumer information to the internet, lectured widely on the emerging field of 'health informatics,' and earned a global reputation as a true innovator and pioneer in the field." He died April 14, 2006, while undergoing treatment in Little Rock, Arkansas.
