= Danny Heatley =

Danny Heatley may refer to:

- Dany Heatley (born 1981), Canadian professional ice hockey player
- Danny Heatley (musician), British drummer
