= Israel Center for the Treatment of Psychotrauma =

The Israel Center for the Treatment of Psychotrauma (ICTP) affiliated with Herzog Hospital in West Jerusalem, is a community-based trauma center.

== History ==
The Israel Center for the Treatment of Psychotrauma was established in 1989 to improve the level of trauma-related services in Israel and around the world. ICTP has developed a comprehensive range of clinical and community-based services. ICTP is today involved in the research and treatment of the widespread effects of trauma caused by terrorism, war and natural disaster.

ICTP has been active in its present form since 1989, but draws on a history of 115-years from the days when Herzog Hospital treated women suffering from Post Natal Depression and then developed programs dealing with veterans of the two world wars. Today the ICTP deals with children, families, victims of terrorism, IDF combat soldiers, survivors of illness, together with natural and man-made disasters. Joining emergency efforts in New York, Chechnya, Turkey, Mexico, Sri Lanka, and most recently Haiti, ICTP's knowledge and expertise has been utilized across the globe.

Over the last several years the ICTP has developed a multi-dimensional project entitled "Building Personal and Professional Resilience" to provide both psycho-education and teach the skills to help individuals as well as professional and community groups cope with the effects of long term exposure to stress and trauma. ICTP has conducted building resilience workshops for policemen, firefighters, paramedics, teachers and bomb squads as part of a "helping the helpers" initiative. Evaluation data of participants in the program has resulted in experiencing significant changes in their levels of resilience, knowledge and skills.

ICTP has conducted many studies documenting the prevalence and treatment of trauma, that have been published in the American Journal of Psychiatry, the American Journal of Orthopsychiatry, The New York Academy of Sciences and others. Danny Brom, Ph.D. is currently the General Director of ICTP.

== Departments of ICTP ==
=== Training in Trauma Treatment ===
Over ten percent of Israel's population suffer from Post Traumatic Stress Disorder (PTSD), a statistic that is three time greater than in the United States. ICTP experts train hundreds of mental health professionals to meet the diverse needs of trauma survivors every year. Cutting edge programs developed by ICTP experts use breakthrough approaches for treating post-traumatic symptoms and reinforcing natural coping mechanisms.

=== Metiv- Trauma and Crisis Treatment Center ===
Committed to the treatment of the trauma survivor, Metiv (Hebrew: מיטיב) provides services through self referral for Jerusalem area residents. Located in Jerusalem's Malha neighborhood, Metiv is an innovative walk-in center that charges no fees.

=== Resilience Unit ===
The Resilience Unit was established to expand the organization's focus on the needs of the community at large and provide resources to the professional and lay public who have been exposed to trauma and long term stress. The first project, The National School Resilience Project, has teamed with the Israeli Ministry of Education to provide help to children, who are particularly vulnerable after exposure to trauma. Since 2002 the unit has administered resilience building training for 4,000 teachers, and early childhood educators, as well as specialized training for in school group treatment for counselors and school psychologists. ICTP has successfully taken their work to Mexico, Spain, and the United States, in the wake of Hurricane Katrina.

The Resilience Unit has developed innovative programs for First Responders in the Israel Police, Firefighters, and Magen David Adom(paramedics) to help these professionals deal with the high levels of exposure to trauma they experience in their workplace. Naomi Baum, Ph.D. is the Director of the Resilience Unit.

=== Medical Trauma and Resilience Unit ===
This new unit was formed in 2008 in order to help individuals with medical conditions and their families, build resilience and cope with traumatic medical experiences. The staff provides psychological intervention and prevention services to patients and family members. The unit also works with healthcare providers, and medical and nursing students, to build their own resilience as they work with challenging populations. The unit also focuses on the increasing local and global awareness of the emerging field of medical psychotrauma and resilience, and its cross-cultural relevance.

=== Child and Adolescent Clinical Services Unit ===
A screening program, to identify children from suffering from PTSD has developed a protocol, screening tools, and in school group treatment programs to address the needs of children who have been exposed to trauma. More than 42,000 children in Israel have been screened and several hundred have participated in group treatment programs. The Resilience Unit has trained school-based mental health professionals to screen children for PTSD as well as treat those who are diagnosed. The resilience unit has completed citywide resilience building project in Nahariya, Acre, Israel, the Mateh Asher Regional Council in the wake of the 2006 Lebanon War. Ruth Pat-Horenczyk, Ph.D. is the Director of the Child and Adolescent Clinical Services Unit.

Parent's Place in Sderot Parents' place in Sderot was built to strengthen the capacity of parents living under continuous threat of missiles attacks. The center in Sderot is based on the model of Parents' Place developed and supported by Jewish Family and Children Services in San Francisco, and aims to provide services for parents coping with the challenges of raising children in times rapidly alternating between normal routine and emergency states.

ICTP has been providing various interventions for parents, children, and educational staff in Sderot and its surrounding areas since 2004. Through the experience gathered by implementing the different interventions, and better familiarity (attunement) with the local needs, the ICTP staff realized that in order to provide young children in these areas with the best care we needed to address their parents' needs. Collaborating with parenting professionals in Israel, the ICTP staff developed unique programs focused on providing parents with knowledge and practical tools of coping with stressful and traumatic experiences as parents of young children.

=== Ethiopian Community Project ===
Many of the 100,000 immigrants that came from Ethiopia have gone through a traumatic journey to reach Israel. Multiple losses through murder, illness, and rape as well as other hardships have characterized the aliyah of most of Ethiopian Jewry. Their absorption into Israeli society has faced many challenges, in addition to the unrecognized and unaddressed trauma they underwent. The ICTP created the first therapeutic programs of mental health services for this community, training Amharic speaking mental health professionals, who in turn also train others. ICTP has found that one of the most tragic effects of the immigration process has been the breakdown of the family unit in addition to high rates of domestic violence, suicide, unemployment and poverty. Currently, ICTP is implementing programs that address the unique needs of both children and parents. ICTP continues to train more workshop facilitators with supervision, conduct groups of parent workshops, train staff working with youth, conduct workshops for youth and provide individual therapy including video documentation.

=== International Trauma ===
Through joint efforts with specialists around the world, ICTP is able to broadly share its unique expertise. Responding to disasters ICTP has sent teams to Sri Lanka in the wake of the Tsunami and to the United States in the wake of Hurricane Katrina. ICTP has also offered assistance in Chechnia and Turkey, working with regional neighbors to enhance capabilities in the face of ongoing conflict. The ICTP is currently developing a project with Haitian colleagues to address the enormous mental health needs since the earthquake of January, 2010.
