= Mymanu =

- Company type: Private
- Industry: Electronics
- Founded: February 2014
- Founders: Danny Manu
- Headquarters: Manchester, England
- Area served: United States, Asia, and Europe
- Key people: Danny Manu (CEO); Stanley Fink, Baron Fink (Former chairman)
- Products: Earbuds, Speakers, and Myjuno app
- Parent: CEH Technologies Ltd
- Website: Mymanu

Mymanu is a trading brand of CEH Technologies Ltd, a British electronics company known for developing innovative audio hardware and software, founded in 2014 by Danny Manu. The company is known for its CLIK translation earbuds, Gabby Smart speakers, and the MyJuno app.

== History ==
Mymanu was established in 2014 in England as a brand of CEH Technologies Ltd, a British electronics company that focuses on development of innovative sound products. Mymanu invests in creation of hardware and software that facilitate music, communication and technology mostly with wireless options. The first product launched under the Mymanu brand was the Gabby Smart Speaker, a waterproof Bluetooth speaker inspired by Danny Manu’s daughter dropping her phone in water. In 2016, Mymanu team invented the Mymanu CLIK earbud as a live voice translation earbud.

== Products ==
=== CLIK earbuds ===
Launched in 2016, the CLIK earbuds are a pair of live voice translation earbuds. They utilize Bluetooth to sync with other devices, allowing real-time translation. The Mymanu CLIK + earbuds were unveiled during 2017 Consumer Electronics Show in Las Vegas. The updated version was unveiled at 2019 Mobile World Congress in Barcelona known as Mymanu CLIK S, and in 2024 they released Mymanu CLIK Pro which is powered with AI. Mymanu major markets are in the U.S, Asia and Europe. In 2017, CLIK was shortlisted as part of Marriott Hotels’ Testbed accelerator programme.

=== Titan earbuds ===
In 2023, Mymanu introduced Titan, the eSIM-enabled earbuds. The Titan reportedly allows users to make and receive calls and messages without a smartphone and supports voice-controlled translation. Described as a "screenless mobile phone" by the BBC, these earbuds represented a new era in wireless communication. The CEO, Danny demonstrated the final version of the earbuds at Consumer Electronics Show 2023 in Las Vegas. Danny also showcased the 4G-Connected wireless Mymanu Titan earbud at 2023 Mobile World Congress in Barcelona.

=== LINK ===
The Mymanu Link is a Bluetooth transmitter and receiver developed by Mymanu, designed to enable wireless connectivity for devices that have an audio jack, like gym equipment, airplanes, or gaming consoles. Users connect their wireless headphones to these non-Bluetooth devices; it was introduced in November 2023.

== Software ==
MyJuno app is a translation and messaging app. Mymanu also offers Mymanu Play, the app that integrates streaming services like Spotify, Deezer and Tidal into a single platform.

== Technology ==
Mymanu’s Clik earbuds utilizes Bluetooth, and additionally, Clik PRO has eSIM technologies for communication. The translation functionality is powered through the MyJuno app, which allows speech-to-text and text-to-speech conversions.

== Recognitions ==
- 2018: GABBY speakers won prestigious innovation awards at CES 2018.
- 2019: Clik S has won the 2019 CES Innovation Awards honoree.
- 2024: Clik PRO has won the prestigious CES 2024 Innovation Award Honoree.

== See also ==
- Wireless earbuds
- Translation technology
