= Daniel Wright =

Daniel Wright or Dan Wright may refer to:

- Dan S. Wright (1802–1867), physician and politician, New York, U.S.
- Daniel B. Wright (1812–1887), U.S. Representative from Mississippi
- Daniel Thew Wright (1864–1943), U.S. federal judge
- Daniel Thew Wright Sr. (1825–1912), 1876 member of the Ohio Supreme Court Commission, U.S.
- Daniel W. Wright (1797–1844), justice of the Supreme Court of Mississippi
- Dan Wright (musician) (born c. 1947), keyboard player for the band Proto-Kaw
- Dan Wright (baseball) (born 1977), American baseball pitcher
- Daniel Wright (baseball) (born 1991), American baseball pitcher
- Dan Wright (comedian) (born 1979), English comedian

== See also ==
- Daniel Wright Junior High School, Lake County, Illinois, U.S.
- Danny Wright (disambiguation)
- Daniel Wight (disambiguation)
