= Daniel Young =

Daniel or Danny Young may refer to:

- Daniel Young (politician) (born 1988), Australian politician
- Daniel Young (cricketer) (born 1990), English cricketer
- Danny Young (basketball) (born 1962), American basketball player
- Danny Young (actor) (born 1986), British actor
- Danny Young (pitcher, born 1971) (1971–2023), American baseball player
- Danny Young (pitcher, born 1994) (born 1994), American baseball player
- Dan Young (1899–1970), British actor
- Daniel Young (artist)
- Daniel Young House, Maine

== See also ==
- Dani Young, Australian singer-songwriter
- Danny Jung, Danish footballer
