= Danny Meagher =

Danny Meagher may refer to:

- Danny Meagher (bishop) (born 1961), auxiliary bishop of the Roman Catholic Archdiocese of Sydney
- Danny Meagher (basketball) (born 1962), Canadian basketball player
