= Danny Romero =

Danny Romero may refer to:

- Danny Romero (boxer)
- Danny Romero (singer)

== See also ==
- Daniel Romero, Argentine footballer
