= D. T. Pollard =

American novelist

D.T. Pollard is the pen name of Danny Pollard, the African-American author of Rooftop Diva: A Novel of Triumph After Katrina and The Trophy Wife Network.

Rooftop Diva was listed as the #1 fiction paperback in a list of local bestsellers from Jokae's African-American Books published in the Dallas Morning News.

He grew up in Henderson, Texas, and now lives in Grand Prairie, Texas with his wife and son.

== Bibliography ==
- Rooftop Diva
- The Trophy Wife Network
- Tarp Town USA
