= Danny Fabry =

Belgian singer

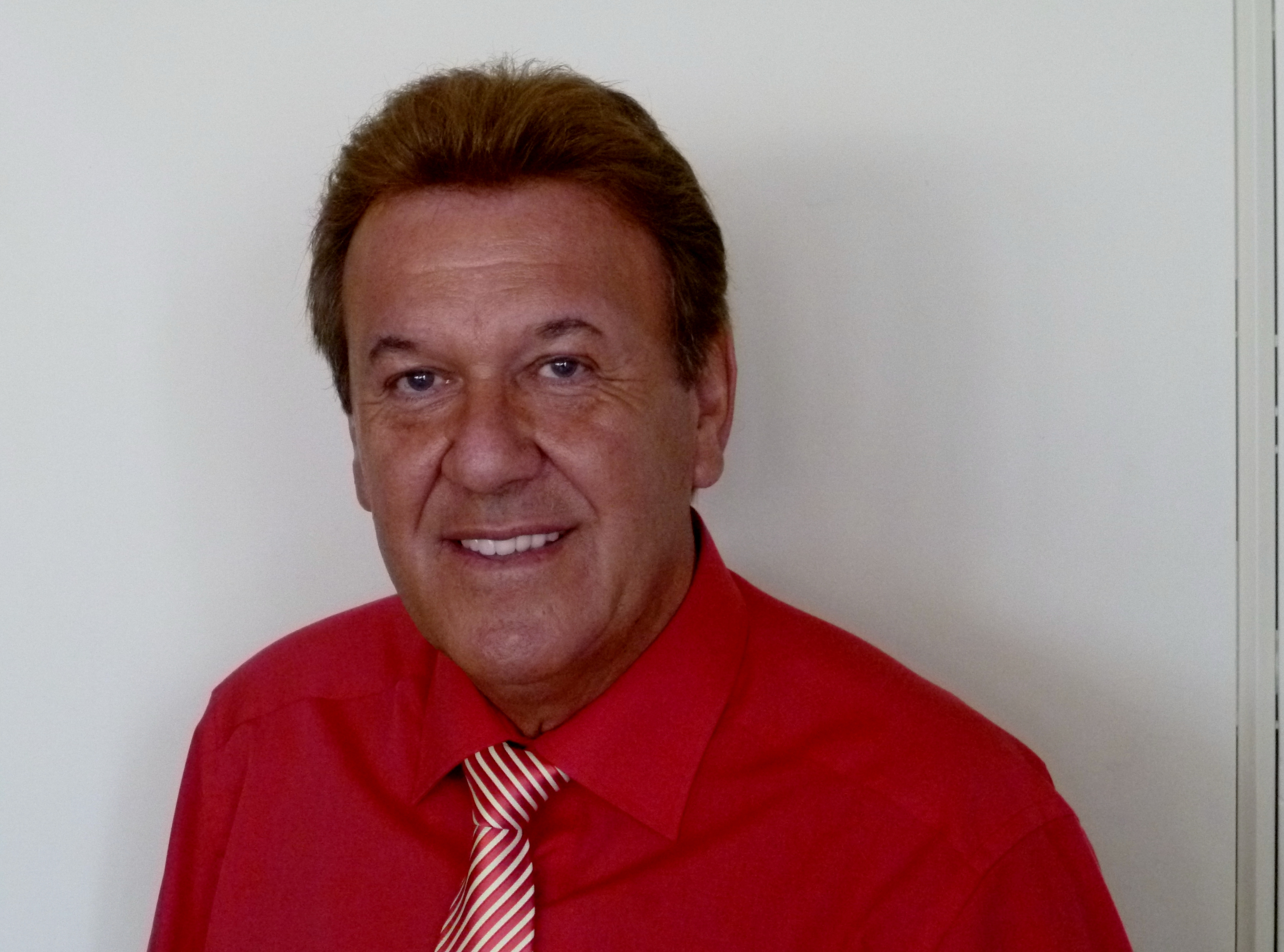

Background information
- Born: 1948 (age 77–78); Leuven, Belgium
- Origin: Flemish
- Genres: schlager
- Occupation: Singer

Robert Esseldeurs (born 1948), stage name Danny Fabry, is a Flemish singer. He had various charting singles in English and Dutch through the 1980s and 1990s. He was married to singer Conny Fabry, but they divorced in the early nineties. After his music career, he operated a restaurant in Scherpenheuvel, which he sold in 2001. Ça c'est la vie en De telefoon.
