= Danny O'Hanlon =

Irish hurler

Personal information
- Born: 1987 (age 38–39) Carrick-on-Suir, County Tipperary, Ireland

Sport
- Sport: Hurling
- Position: Full-forward
Club
- Years: Club
- Carrick Swans
Club titles
- Tipperary titles: 0
Inter-county*
Years	County	Apps (scores)
2007-2008	Tipperary	1 (0-00)
Inter-county titles
- Munster titles: 0
- All-Irelands: 0
- NHL: 0
- All Stars: 0
- *Inter County team apps and scores correct as of 13:22, 16 August 2021.

Danny O'Hanlon (born 1987) is an Irish hurler who plays at club level with Carrick Swans. He is a former member of the Tipperary senior hurling team.

== Playing career ==
O'Hanlon first played hurling at juvenile and underage levels with the Carrick Swans club, before joining the club's top adult team. He first appeared on the inter-county scene at minor level with Tipperary before later lining out in the 2006 All-Ireland under-21 final defeat by Kilkenny. He was drafted onto the Tipperary senior hurling team in 2007. O'Hanlon won an All-Ireland Championship title with the Tipperary intermediate team in 2013.

== Career statistics ==
Team	Year	National League			Munster		All-Ireland		Total	
Team	Year	Division	Apps	Score	Apps	Score	Apps	Score	Apps	Score
Tipperary	2007	Division 1B	5	4-02	1	0-00	0	0-00	6	4-02
Career total			5	4-02	1	0-00	0	0-00	6	4-02

== Honours ==
Carrick Swans

- Munster Intermediate Hurling Championship: 2010, 2017

Tipperary

- All-Ireland Intermediate Hurling Championship: 2013
- Munster Intermediate Hurling Championship: 2013
- Munster Under-21 Hurling Championship: 2006, 2008
