= Danny Jennings =

Australian rules footballer

Personal information
- Full name: Danny Jennings
- Born: 27 July 1949 (age 77)
- Original team: Rye
- Height: 174 cm (5 ft 9 in)
- Weight: 70 kg (154 lb)

Playing career^{1}
| Years | Club | Games (Goals) |
| 1969–70 | Melbourne | 9 (3) |
- ^{1} Playing statistics correct to the end of 1970.

Danny Jennings (born 27 July 1949) is a former Australian rules footballer who played with Melbourne in the Victorian Football League (VFL).
