= Danny Pang =

Danny Pang is the name of:

- Danny Pang (financier) (1966–2009), Taiwanese-American hedge fund manager
- Danny Pang Phat (born 1965), film editor, who with his identical twin brother, film director Oxide, are known as the Pang Brothers
