= Danny Leclère =

Belgian drug dealer

- Born: 1959; Hasselt, Belgium
- Died: 14 February 1993 (aged 33–34); Rotterdam, The Netherlands
- Cause of death: Murder
- Other names: Doctor XTC; Ecstasy Professor
- Occupations: Gangster; criminal; Illegal drug trade; drug producer
- Years active: 1989-1993
- Criminal charges: all kind of illegal drug affairs
- Wanted by: The Netherlands; Belgium
- Wanted since: 1993

Danny Leclère, alias Dokter XTC and Ecstasy Professor, was a Belgian dealer, producer and distributor of illegal drugs mainly XTC. He created a method to create pure XTC in a fast way and set up an international distribution channel across Europe and beyond.

== Biography ==
Leclère was born in Hasselt, Belgium in 1959. After high school he went to university to become a Doctor of Medicine. During his studies he learnt chemistry and physics so he was able to create medicines for health purposes. Late 1980's speed was the main party drug in nightlife. Leclère was aware speed comes in all forms and contains dangerous ingredients and it was a risk to take them as you never knew what was inside. Furthermore, it is addictive and causes health problems over time. Leclère wanted to create "pure XTC", manufactured in a stable, controlled environment and which did not cause health issues nor addiction, only a few temporary side effects. Although he would produce it in an illegal circuit he wrongly thought authorities would legitimate the consumption of his product.

To gain money in order to start his research he first created a scam in hashish. Somehow he was able to buy an outdated minesweeper. This minesweeper could not be detected by radar so he used it to smuggle the hashish from Morocco to the Belgian coast. The hashish were dropped off in sea and floated towards the beach due to the ocean waves. Once stranded the drugs were picked up by vans and transported through Europe. On 11 July 1989 a van got stuck on the beach of Oostduinkerke, the police arrived and found 4000 kilo of hashish. During interrogation of the occupants, the name of Leclère was spilt so he was taken to jail.

The day after leclère was arrested the examining magistrate decided he could go home awaiting his trial, thus Leclère immediately fled to the Netherlands after his release. There he continued his research and found a formula to improve XTC so it was - according him - a safe product to use. He set up an illegal factory which could produce XTC in high volume, he hired over 200 workmen, bribed police man, customs... and set up a network to distribute the drug inside Europe and beyond.

In the battle against all forms of illegal drugs, the Dutch government founded IRT: a police organization which relied on drug dealers and drug users to become a spy in an attempt to track down drug traffics and laboratories. In return the spies were given reduced sentence or acquittal. IRT arrested Leclère on 14 February 1991, in Rotterdam. Later IRT itself came under fire for alleged drug trafficking as staff was bribed by their own spies.

Two weeks after Leclère was arrested by IRT he was given permission to attend the funeral of his mother. He took the opportunity to escape during the ceremony. As all of his money and equipment were confiscated, he contacted the "Delta group", a criminal Dutch organization to which Jan Femer and Mink Kok belonged among others. Leclère knew that Delta Group did not yet trade in XTC and was able to convince them to enter into a partnership.

Although Leclère was heavily guarded by the Delta Group, was hidden by them in various shelters and was internationally signaled, he dared to go outside alone several times. On 20 May 1993, he made a car drive on a highway in Amsterdam where he was shot dead. The perpetrator, the motive and the underlying organization of the murder are not yet known.

Nowadays XTC is still produced with the formula developed by Leclère.
