= Danny Paul =

English rugby union footballer

Danny Paul (born 15 December 1986) is a former professional rugby union footballer for Leeds Carnegie. His regular position was at prop, later moving to play in the back row and number 8. Through an injury-ridden career Danny amassed 25 appearances for the club, from 2006 - 2011, including three starting XV places.
