= Danny Abdul Dayem =

British citizen of Syrian descent

Danny Abdul Dayem is a British citizen of Syrian descent who came to prominence during the Syrian Uprising. He became a citizen-journalist who reported from Homs, Syria between 2011 and 2012, most notably during its siege by government forces, particularly the 2012 Bombardment of Homs. His news reports and pleas for help were picked up by major news channels including CNN, BBC, Al Jazeera, and al-Arabiya. Danny reportedly caused controversy when he stated "we will take help from anyone, Israel, we don't care." He also caused controversy when a video showed that his reporting was staged to promote an anti-Syrian agenda. He has publicly called for an "army intervention, a strike on Assad's regime and a no-fly zone".

== See also ==
- Media coverage of the Syrian civil war
