= Danny Shanahan =

American cartoonist (1956-2021)

- Born: July 11, 1956; Brooklyn, New York
- Died: July 5, 2021 (aged 64)
- Education: Paier College
- Occupation: Cartoonist
- Years active: 1988–2020
- Known for: His work for The New Yorker

Danny Shanahan (July 11, 1956 – July 5, 2021) was an American cartoonist who was known for his work for The New Yorker, which he worked for until 2020, when he was arrested on a charge of possession of child pornography.

== Life and career ==
Daniel Patrick Shanahan was born on 11 July 1956 in Brooklyn, New York. He spent his early life in Long Island and later in Bethlehem, Connecticut, where he attended Paier College.

Shanahan formally started his career in the 1980s, when he became an unofficial cartoonist for the United States Tennis Association.

Between 1988 and 2020, Shanahan worked for The New Yorker as a cartoonist and illustrator. During that period, he published more than nine hundred cartoons in the magazine. His work has also appeared in Playboy.

== Legal trouble and death ==
On December 10, 2020, he was arrested for possession of child pornography at his home in Rhinebeck, New York, at which point The New Yorker suspended his contract. The case was not resolved by the time of his death from multiple organ failure on July 5, 2021.

== Books ==
- Buckledown the Workhound (1993)
- The Bus Ride That Changed History (2005)
