= Danny Lopez =

Danny Lopez may refer to:

- Danny Lopez (athlete) (born 1968), American middle-distance runner
- Danny Lopez (boxer) (born 1952), American former boxer
- Danny Lopez (businessman) (born 1974) British businessman
  - Danny Lopez (consul) (born 1974), British Consul General to New York
- Danny Lopez (politician) (born 1990/1991) American politician
- Danny López Soto (1944–2011), legislator in Puerto Rico
