= Danny Reuther =

German footballer (born 1988)

Personal information
- Full name: Danny Reuther
- Date of birth: June 22, 1988 (age 38)
- Place of birth: Eisenberg, Germany
- Height: 1.70 m (5 ft 7 in)
- Position: Midfielder

Team information
- Current team: BSG Chemie Kahla
- Number: 29

Youth career
- 1999–2003: Eintracht Eisenberg
- 2003–2007: FC Carl Zeiss Jena

Senior career*
Years	Team	Apps	(Gls)
2007–2009	FC Carl Zeiss Jena II	44	(1)
2008	FC Carl Zeiss Jena	3	(0)
2009	ZFC Meuselwitz	0	(0)
2010	SV Schott Jena	2	(0)
2010–2013	Eintracht Eisenberg	2	(1)
2013–2016	SV Schott Jena	81	(15)
2016–2018	Eintracht Eisenberg	49	(23)
2018–	BSG Chemie Kahla	41	(18)
- * Club domestic league appearances and goals as of 22 January 2021

Danny Reuther (born 22 June 1988 in Eisenberg) is a German footballer who plays for BSG Chemie Kahla.

== Career ==
Reuther, who began his career in his hometown by SV Eintracht Eisenberg, joined the youth from FC Carl Zeiss Jena in 2003. In the season 2008/2009, he was promoted to the first team, where he had his debut on 23 August 2008 against Kickers Emden. In January 2009, he was cut from the first squad and moved to the reserve team. He then signed with ZFC Meuselwitz on 9 July 2009. After only a half year with ZFC Meuselwitz, he returned to Jena and signed for SV Schott Jena. After the relegation of SV Schott Jena in the Thüringer Verbandsliga, he joined SV Eintracht Eisenberg on 28 June 2010.
