= Danny Murnane =

Australian rules footballer

Personal information
- Full name: Daniel William Ewart Murnane
- Born: 23 March 1925
- Died: 18 April 2016 (aged 91)
- Original team: Moorabbin / Rochester
- Height: 188 cm (6 ft 2 in)
- Weight: 86 kg (190 lb)

Playing career^{1}
Years	Club	Games (Goals)
1947–48	St Kilda	6 (3)
- ^{1} Playing statistics correct to the end of 1948.

Daniel William Ewart Murnane (23 March 1925 – 18 April 2016) was an Australian rules footballer who played with St Kilda in the Victorian Football League (VFL).
