= Danny Gold =

Danny Gold may refer to:

- Danny Gold (journalist), American journalist and host for Vice News
- Danny Gold, pseudonym of Ben Goldman used on the fake news website Liberty Writers News
- Daniel Gold, general in the Israel Defense Forces
