= Danny Reible =

American engineer

Danny Reible is an American engineer, currently the Donovan Maddox Distinguished Engineering Chair and Paul Whitfield Horn Professor in Civil, Environmental and Construction Engineering at Texas Tech University with a joint appointment in Chemical Engineering. He was previously the director of the Center for Research for Water Resources and Bettie Margaret Smith Chaired Professor at University of Texas at Austin. He also served as the director of the Hazardous Substance Research Center/South and Southwest and Chevron Professor at Louisiana State University where he remains a Professor Emeritus. He also served as the Shell Professor of Environmental Engineering at University of Sydney. He is a Fellow of the American Association for the Advancement of Science, the American Institute of Chemical Engineers, the National Academy of Inventors and the Chinese Academy of Environmental Sciences. In 2005 he was elected a member of the National Academy of Engineering for "the development of widely used means of managing contaminated sediments". He is a Board Certified Environmental Engineer of the American Academy of Environmental Engineers and Scientists and the 2017 Kappe Lecturer. He is the author of Fundamentals of Environmental Engineering, now in its 2nd edition, a coauthor of Diffusion Models of Environmental Transport and editor of four other books.
