= Danny Rich =

Danny or Daniel Rich may refer to:

- Danny Rich, a character in the film Anaconda
- Danny Rich (rabbi), former Chief Executive of Liberal Judaism in the United Kingdom
- Daniel Rich (born 1990), Australian sportsman
