= Danny Kastner =

American musician

- Occupations: musician, composer, director, producer, and entrepreneur
- Years active: 1995–present

Danny Kastner is an American musician, composer, director, producer, and entrepreneur.

Kastner is the founder of multiple music and interactive technology companies, most recently If So, Then Joy Corporation, an American technology and creative venture studio. Under the alias of Happy Montana he performs, produces and writes music based on of Nashville, TN Kastner has written and produced music for Broadway performer artist Ryan McCartan, Tkay Maidza, Espa, Kiah Victoria and others in collaboration with songwriter Autumn Rowe. He has produced and co-written a project in 2023 with the artist, Nellie McKay. Kastner is a professional keyboardist for the Kiefer Sutherland band since July, 2015. He frequently performed as a jazz pianist in clubs around Los Angeles as a member of the band the Jazz Punks. With their debut album, from May 2012 to July 2012, Jazz Punks spent seven weeks in the top four of the CMJ Jazz Radio charts, as well as holding the #1 position during this time.

Kastner is a Founding Partner & Creative Director of the Milt Olin Foundation, launching a global movement dedicated to ending distracted driving through the Stop Wrex campaign.

Kastner is a producer and co-founder of The Weather Report Legacy Project honoring the seminal jazz group Weather Report, with Tony Zawinul, son of the late Joe Zawinul. He is producing the Weather Report documentary "This is This," directed by Tony Zawinul. He drove the fan-centered campaign to raise $62,438 for the documentary on crowdfunding website, Indiegogo. Kastner's been influential in multiple successful crowdfunding initiatives for artists.

Previously, Kastner was CEO of FanRocket, an internet digital content production company he founded in 2005. He produced and directed video for numerous online projects and networks including Wonderglen for HBO, Casual Fridays and HSN's, "Faces of Beautiful You." FanRocket also created VooZoo, a movie sharing technology for Facebook, with Paramount Pictures.

Kastner has founded two internet start-ups driven by music and the arts, Music Interactive and POPstick. At POPstick, Kastner created interactive animation marketing technology for Microsoft, IBM, Dell, among other technology firms. In 2004, Kastner launched POPstick Outburst and coined the term social network marketing as an approach towards brand marketing through social networks. He hired advertising executive, Steve Dworin, former chairman/CEO of NW Ayer as the president of the initiative.

Kastner appeared on the third season of NBC's The Apprentice and was cast after submitting a video entitled "Apprentice the Musical" which was featured during the credits of episode 9. After being "fired" by Donald Trump, Kastner, who holds a master's degree in music composition from Boston University, wrote songs about his experience on the show. These, along with weekly musical recaps of each episode, were played on radio stations across the country. Kastner was re-hired by Donald Trump in an episode of Queer Eye that followed the Apprentice, in 2005, where Kastner organized a charity event for underprivileged children which won praise from Trump.

As a composer, Kastner is a two-time BMI Composition Award winner, as well as a two-time ASCAP Foundation Morton Gould Young Composer Award Recipient. Kastner composed music for Padmé, the fan film that won the George Lucas Selects Award in the 2008 Star Wars Fan Movie Challenge.
