= Danny Brom =

Dutch psychologist

Danny Brom is a clinical psychologist and founding director of the Israel Center for the Treatment of Psychotrauma of Herzog Hospitalin Jerusalem, Israel.

Brom is originally from the Netherlands, where he founded a psychotrauma center. He is the initiator and former chairman of the Israel Trauma Coalition. In his position of Director at ICTP, he has brought his expertise to the fields of education, community resilience, health and mental health care to increase the capacity of Israeli society to cope with the ongoing existential threat. Among his work is the oversight of academic research of the prevalence and condition of posttraumatic stress disorder among combat soldiers in the Israel Defense Forces. Brom has published several books and articles on posttraumatic stress disorder. He published the first controlled outcome study on short-term therapy for posttraumatic stress disorder in 1989. His most recent book, The Trauma of Terrorism: Sharing Knowledge and Shared Care, an International Handbook, was launched at the U.N. in 2005. Brom gave a congressional briefing hosted by former Senator Hillary Clinton about the effects of terrorism and trauma. His main effort goes to bridging the gap between scientific data and the development of service provision in the community.

== Publications ==
- D. Brom, R. Pat-Horenczyk and J. Ford (Eds.) (2009). Treating Traumatized Children: Risk, Resilience and Recovery, Routledge.
- Pat-Horenczyk, Ruth. Qaswari, Radwan. Lesack, Roseanne. Haj-Yahia, Muhammad. Peled, Osnat. Shaheen, Mohammed. Berger, Rony. Brom, Danny. Garber, Randi. Abdeen, Ziad. (2009) "Posttraumatic Symptoms, Functional Impairment, and Coping among Adolescents on Both Sides of the Israeli-Palestinian Conflict: A Cross-Cultural Approach". The International Association of Applied Psychology, 2009.
- Pat-Horenczyk, Ruth. Abramovitz, Robert. Peled, Osnat. Brom, Daniel. Daie, Ayala. Chemtob, Claude M. (2007) "Adolescent Exposure to Recurrent Terrorism in Israel: Posttraumatic Distress and Functional Impairment". American Journal of Orthopsychiatry, 2007.
- Pat-Horenczyk, Ruth. Peled, Osnat. Miron, Tomer. Brom, Daniel. Villa, Yael, Chemtob, Claude M. (2007) "Risk Taking Behaviors Among Israeli Adolescents Exposed to Recurrent Terrorism: Provoking Danger Under Continuous Threat?". American Journal of Psychiatry, 2007.
- Pat-Horenczyk, R., & Brom, D. (2007). "The multiple faces of post traumatic growth". Applied Psychology: An International Review, 2007.
