= Danny Templeton =

Scottish footballer

Personal information
- Full name: Daniel Templeton
- Date of birth: 1897
- Place of birth: Glasgow, Scotland
- Position: Inside forward

Senior career*
| Years | Team | Apps | (Gls) |
| 1916–1918 | Queen's Park | 0 | (0) |
| 1920–1922 | Queen's Park | 48 | (5) |
| 1922–1924 | Partick Thistle | 13 | (1) |
| 1924–1925 | Ayr United | 23 | (0) |
- * Club domestic league appearances and goals

Daniel Templeton was a Scottish amateur footballer who played as an inside forward in the Scottish League for Queen's Park, Ayr United and Partick Thistle.

== Personal life ==
Templeton worked as a clerk. He served as an Air Mechanic 2nd Class in the Royal Air Force during the First World War.

== Career statistics ==
Appearances and goals by club, season and competition
| Club | Season | League | | | Scottish Cup | | Other | | Total | |
| Club | Season | Division | Apps | Goals | Apps | Goals | Apps | Goals | Apps | Goals |
|---|---|---|---|---|---|---|---|---|---|---|
| Queen's Park | 1920–21 | Scottish First Division | 13 | 0 | 0 | 0 | 1 (Note: Appearance in Glasgow Merchants Charity Cup) | 0 | 14 | 0 |
| Queen's Park | 1921–22 | Scottish First Division | 35 | 5 | 3 | 1 | 0 | 0 | 38 | 6 |
| Queen's Park | Total | | 48 | 5 | 3 | 1 | 1 | 0 | 52 | 6 |
| Partick Thistle | 1922–23 | Scottish First Division | 13 | 1 | 0 | 0 | — | | 13 | 1 |
| Ayr United | 1923–24 | Scottish First Division | 10 | 1 | 1 | 0 | — | | 11 | 1 |
| Ayr United | 1924–25 | Scottish First Division | 13 | 0 | 0 | 0 | — | | 13 | 0 |
| Ayr United | Total | | 23 | 1 | 1 | 0 | — | | 24 | 1 |
| Career total | | | 84 | 7 | 4 | 1 | 1 | 0 | 89 | 8 |
