= Danny Manu =

British Entrepreneur

- Born: Danny Manu; 5 December 1988 (age 37); Manchester, England
- Education: Oxford Brookes University
- Occupation: Business executive
- Years active: 2014- present
- Known for: Electronic engineering
- Notable work: CLIK earbuds
- Title: Founder at Mymanu

Danny Manu (born 5 December 1988), is a British engineer and tech entrepreneur. He is the founder and CEO at Mymanu, a British electronic and software brand owned by CEH Technologies LTD, founded in 2014, known for producing various innovative audio Software and Hardware including CLIK earbuds, Gabby Smart speakers, and Myjuno app among others. Mymanu CLIK earbuds are live voice translation earbuds. Gabby Smart speakers are waterproof wireless speakers, while the Myjuno app is a translating and messaging app with the option of 37 languages.

Born in London, England, Danny has a background in Aerospace engineering, music production and sound engineering with a degree from Oxford Brookes University in England. He worked as an aerospace engineer, software developer, and music producer for various notable artists. Danny was recognized by Google for his contributions to science, arts and culture.

== Biography ==
Danny was born on 5 December 1988 in London, England to Ghanaian parents. Danny completed his elementary and high school studies in England. He attended Oxford Brookes University in England, where he obtained a bachelor's degree in sound engineering and music technology. Between 2018 and 2019, Danny worked as a global technology engineer at Quanta Networks Inc, a Canadian telecommunication company.

== Business career ==
=== Mymanu ===
In 2014, Danny founded Mymanu in England as an audio technology brand under CEH Technologies LTD. His first product was the Gabby Smart Speaker, inspired by his daughter's phone being dropped in water. In 2016, Danny introduced Mymanu CLIK earbuds, live translation earbuds with Bluetooth, text-to-speech, and speech-to-text capabilities. The Mymanu CLIK S followed in 2019, and in 2024, the CLIK Pro with AI was launched. In 2023, Danny released the Mymanu Titan, a wireless earbud with eSIM, allowing calls and internet use without a phone.

=== MEDYBIRD ===
In 2020, during COVID-19 pandemic, Danny created Medybird company as a manufacturer and supplier of Personal Protective Equipment (PPE) and other safety equipment. The company contributed to supplying and shipping out PPE units to countries in need.

== Music ==
Danny has a background in music and art, he worked for years as a music producer, featured on The X Factor and worked with a couple of international artists including Fleur East among others. He was recognized by Google for his contributions to science, arts and culture.
