= Danny Liddell =

Scottish footballer

Danny Liddell (17 February 1912 – 9 June 1982) was a Scottish footballer who played at outside right. He played with St Johnstone F.C. between 1958 and 1962. Signed from Clydebank Juniors on 13 December 1958, transferred to Stenhousemuir on 10 March 1962. Liddell played 41 games, scored eight goals.

He was the brother of Johnny Liddell, a centre forward, also of St Johnstone.
