= Danny Chan (disambiguation) =

Danny Chan (1958–1993) is a Hong Kong singer. Danny or Daniel Chan may also refer to:

- Danny Chan Kwok-kwan (born 1975), Hong Kong actor
- Daniel Chan (born 1975), Hong Kong singer, and actor
- Daniel Chan Chi-pun (1957–1995), Hong Kong drug trafficker

== See also ==
- Danny Chen (1992–2011), Chinese-American soldier
