= Danny Farrar =

Australian rugby league footballer

Personal information
- Born: 2 April 1968 (age 56)

Playing information
- Position: Hooker
Club
Years	Team	Pld	T	G	FG	P
1992–97	Penrith Panthers	79	9	0	0	36
1998–00	Warrington Wolves	85	16	0	0	64
	Total	164	25	0	0	100

Danny Farrar (born 2 April 1968) is an Australian former professional rugby league footballer who played for the Penrith Panthers and the Warrington Wolves.

Farrar started his career in the lower grades at Parramatta, having played his juniors for the local Seven Hills club.

Debuting for Penrith in 1992, Farrar played first-grade for six seasons, mostly as hooker. He was a member of the Penrith side which competed in the 1997 Super League finals series.

From 1998 to 2000 he played for Warrington, after he had made an impression on the coach when Penrith defeated the English club at the 1997 World Club Championship. For much of his time at Warrington he played as club captain.
