= Danny Hutchinson =

American football player and coach

Playing career
- 1909: Penn
- Positions: Halfback, quarterback, fullback

Coaching career (HC unless noted)
- 1912: Penn (assistant)
- 1913: Wesleyan
- 1914: Pennsylvania Military

Head coaching record
- Overall: 5–3–1

Danny Hutchinson was an American college football player and coach. He played football for the University of Pennsylvania in 1908 and 1909 and served as the head football coach at Wesleyan University in 1913.

== Athlete ==
He played quarterback and halfback for the University of Pennsylvania football team in 1908 and 1909. He also performed punting duties for Penn and first gained acclaim as "the great punter of 1908." The New York Times described him as "the star back-field" player for the 1909 Penn Quakers football team. In 1910, Hutchinson was declared ineligible to play football by Penn's faculty athletic committee because of "conditions in his studies." The loss of Hutchinson was described as "a severe blow to Pennsylvania's football prospects."

== Coach ==
In 1912, he served as an assistant football coach under Andy Smith at the University of Pennsylvania. In April 1913, he was hired as the head football coach at Wesleyan University. In his single season as Wesleyan's head football coach, Hutchinson compiled a 5–3–1 record. In December 1913, Wesleyan announced that Hutchinson would not be re-engaged as the football coach for the 1914 season. The New York Times reported that the team had made a good showing in the early part of the season but had slumped in the final two games against Williams College and Trinity College. Hutchinson later became a tennis player. In March 1920, he was defeated in a doubles match in the second round of the annual tournament for the court tennis championship of the United States.
