= Danny Venter =

South African soccer player

Personal information
- Full name: Danny Wayne Venter
- Date of birth: 19 May 1987 (age 39)
- Place of birth: Klerksdorp, South Africa
- Height: 1.84 m (6 ft 0 in)
- Position: Winger

Senior career*
Years	Team	Apps	(Gls)
–2010	Garankuwa United		
2010–2013	Bloemfontein Celtic	41	(3)
2013–2017	Free State Stars	106	(14)
2018–2020	Golden Arrows	53	(6)
2020–2022	Free State Stars	24	(1)
- * Club domestic league appearances and goals as of 1 May 2023

Danny Venter (born 19 May 1987) is a South African professional soccer player who last played for second-tier club Free State Stars as a midfielder.
