= Danny Vera =

Danny Vera may refer to:

- Danny Vera (singer) (born 1977), Dutch singer-songwriter
- Danny Vera (footballer) (born 1980), Ecuadorian footballer
