= Danny Wright =

Danny Wright may refer to:

- Danny Wright (footballer) (born 1984), English football forward
- Danny Wright (pianist) (born 1963), American pianist
- Danny Wright (radio personality), American radio personality

== See also ==
- Daniel Wright (disambiguation)
