= Danny Figueroa =

American serial killer

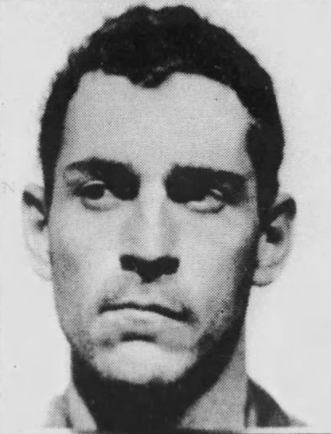
- Figueroa in a 1986 wanted flyer
- Born: September 24, 1959; Moreno Valley, California, U.S.
- Died: December 20, 1998 (aged 39); Lakewood, California, U.S.
- Other names: "The Backwoods Sniper" "The Rifle Killer"; Mark Salozar; David Salozar; David Sanders; David Scott
- Conviction: Murder (3 counts)
- Penalty: 66 years to life in prison

Details
- Victims: 3
- Span of crimes: May 13 – June 17, 1986
- Country: United States
- State: California
- Date apprehended: June 28, 1986

Danny Figueroa (September 24, 1959 – December 20, 1998), known as The Backwoods Sniper, was an American serial killer who shot and killed three people in Southern California within the span of two months in 1986. A self-described survivalist, he killed his victims in rural woodland areas in Riverside and San Bernardino counties. He pleaded guilty to three counts of murder in 1987 and was sentenced to 66 years to life in prison.

== Early life ==
Born on September 24, 1959, in Moreno Valley, California, Figueroa was said to have enjoyed the outdoors growing up more than spending time with his parents. It was said that Figueroa had the mental state of a child in his adult years, preferring to spend time with children half as old as him in a non-sexual manner. He was infatuated with wearing military clothing and hunting in the woods, and with sleeping outdoors.

== Murders ==
Figueroa committed his first murder on May 13, 1986. That day, he was wandering with a rifle around a rural area of Aguanga when he spotted 53-year-old Reynold Johnson during yard work outside of his home. Figueroa promptly shot Johnson, killing him. On the night of May 14, Figueroa was wandering around the property of Thomas Breedlove. Breedlove took notice and went out to investigate, only to be confronted by Figueroa pointing a rifle at him. Thomas' son, David, noticed what was happening and rushed out with his own gun and shot at Figueroa, causing him to retreat.

The next morning, Thomas and David Breedlove followed the footprints their attempted attacker had left, and they eventually discovered a backpack deep into the woods that contained a quote from the Bible: "I have been crucified with Christ; and it is no longer I who live, but Christ lives in me; and the life which I now live in the flesh I live by faith in the Son of God, who loved me and gave Himself up for me". Just over two weeks later, on May 29, Figueroa became wary after noticing that 19-year-old Raymond Webber had been following him in his pick-up truck across a 25-mile hike up Palomar Mountain. (Note: Events Figueroa claim happened) In response to this, Figueroa brandished his shotgun and shot Webber once in the head, killing him instantly. It turned out Webber was actually on his way to work after some rented equipment was discovered in his vehicle.

On June 8, Robert Jimenez was out in his backyard in Indio when he spotted a man wearing green military clothing carrying a rifle walking just outside of his property. The man, who was Figueroa, waved and smiled at him, before brandishing his rifle and pointed it at Jimenez, prompting Jimenez to take cover behind some bushes. Figueroa began attempting to gun down Jimenez, hitting him two times, once in the shoulder and right arm, but Jimenez ultimately ran to a neighbor's house to take cover on a patio while Figueroa continued to shoot. One bullet struck a window, causing the homeowner to run out and attempt to chase the man, but quickly retreated when he saw the man holding a rifle. Figueroa eventually retreated, and Jimenez survived.

On June 17, 72-year-old Mary Rose Lengerich was last seen walking her dog along San Timoteo Canyon Road in Redlands. Sometime during the walk, Figueroa, wearing the same military-style clothing and carrying a rifle, approached and fatally shot Lengerich. He then fled the area, and was seen by two construction workers, who, when learning about Lengerich's murder, reported what they witnessed.

== Search ==
The discovery of three bodies within the span of just over a month sparked fear in both Riverside and San Bernardino counties. Both Thomas Breedlove and Robert Jimenez reported their encounters of a man wearing military clothes and carrying a rifle, and both by then had started to speculate if he was the killer. This was backed up by witnesses who claimed have seen a man wearing military clothes and carrying a rifle in the area.

At the height of the panic, authorities organized search dogs and helicopters to scour the area, looking for a man matching the description of the killer, who by then had been nicknamed The Backwoods Sniper. At some point during the investigation, Figueroa was named as a suspect in Lengerich's killing, and was subsequently connected to the other killings and attacks. Witnesses who reported seeing the killer were shown Figueroa's picture, all of whom identified him as the man they had seen. After a 12-day search, authorities discovered him still wearing his military uniform hiding under a flood-control channel, and he was arrested without incident.

== Court proceedings ==
After Figueroa was arrested, he was booked to Riverside County Jail and was charged with attempted murder in the shooting of Robert Jimenez. He was later charged with three counts of first degree murder with special circumstances. Figueroa admitted responsibility but claimed the murder of Raymond Webber was done in self-defense, after Webber followed Figueroa for 25-miles. In the end, Figueroa pleaded guilty to the murders to avoid a possible death sentence and was sentenced to 66 years to life in prison in 1987. He died in prison on December 20, 1998.

== See also ==
- List of serial killers in the United States

== Bibliography ==
- Robert Keller (May 10, 2020). 50 American Serial Killers You've Probably Never Heard Of: Volume 9. ASIN B088FHR4L3.
