= Danny Carroll =

Danny Carroll may refer to:

- Daniel Carroll (rugby union) (1892–1956), Australian rugby union player
- Danny Carroll (Iowa politician) (born 1953), member of the Iowa House of Representatives
- Danny Carroll (Kentucky politician) (born 1963), member of the Kentucky Senate
