= Danny Noonan =

Danny Noonan may refer to:

- Danny Noonan (American football) (born 1965), former Dallas Cowboys and Green Bay Packers player
- Danny Noonan (Australian footballer) (born 1968), former Brisbane Bears player
- Danny Noonan, a character in the 1980 film Caddyshack played by Michael O'Keefe
