= Danny Monico =

American filmmaker

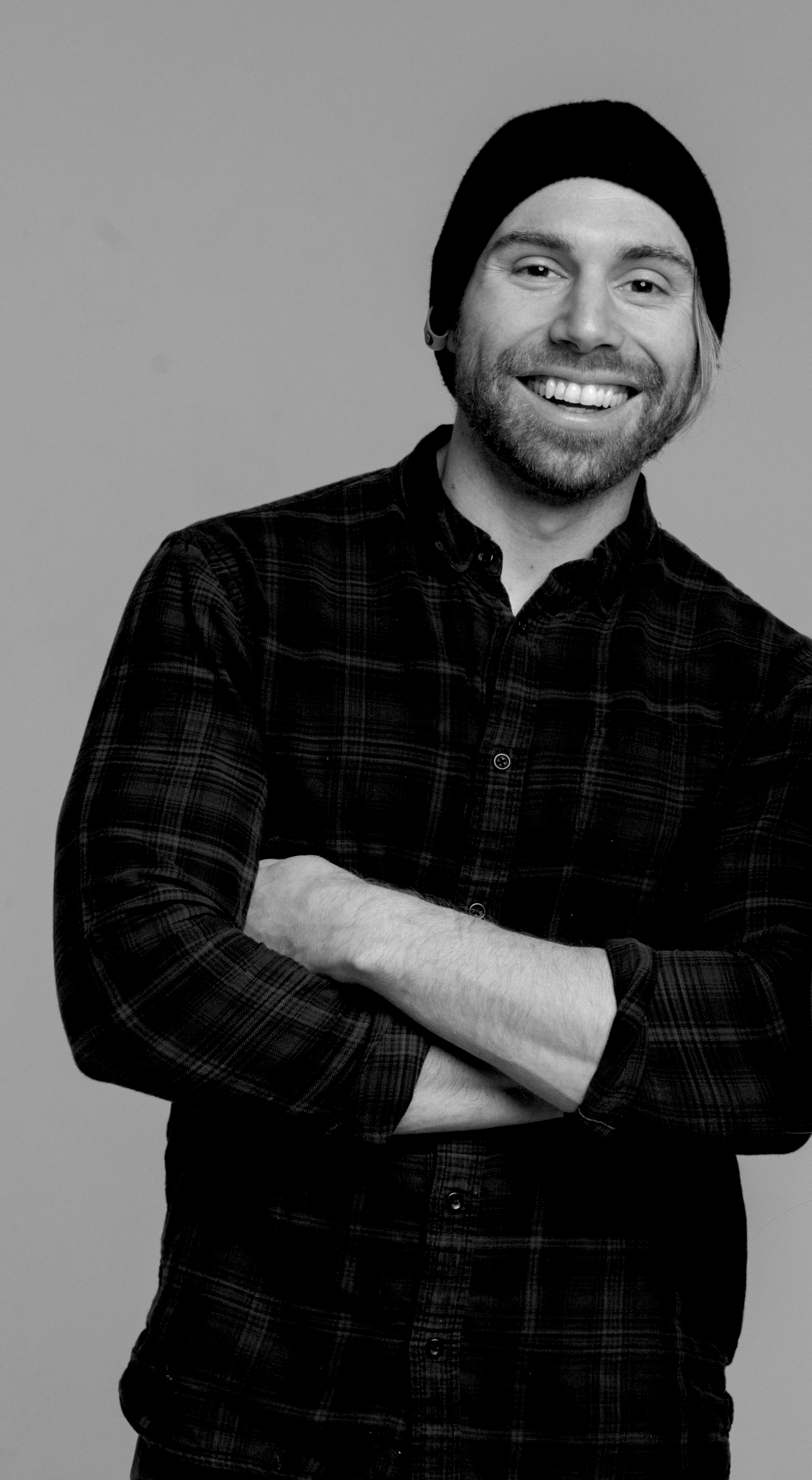
- Filmmaker Danny Monico in 2020
- Born: Montclair, New Jersey, USA
- Occupations: Documentary Filmmaker; Writer; Director; Producer
- Website: dannymonico.com

Danny Monico is an Emmy Nominated film Director, Writer and Producer. In 2025, 'The Third Rail', which he Co-Directed with Jasmine Wang was nominated for an Emmy. He also won the Grand Prize Jury Award at the Montclair Film Festival, for the short film, 'Brenda'. In 2020, he produced a short film, A Father’s Newfound Feminism, narrated by Jon Hamm, for the New Yorker Daily Shouts column. His narrative films have been presented on PBS, The Montclair Film Festival, and the Manhattan Film Festival.

== Biography ==
Monico and Luke Parker Bowles co-founded the production company Scoundrel Films in 2017. The two worked together at Open Road Media in New York City. Monico served as president until 2020.

In 2019, Monico created a one-hour television program called Short Focus, consisting of five short films with discussions with the directors.

Monico is the president of Incurrent Media and has produced branded films for clients like TED and MasterCard.
