= Danny Gay =

Danny Gay may refer to:

- Danny Gay (politician) (born 1950), Canadian politician
- Danny Gay (footballer) (born 1982), English footballer
