= Luis S. Fraticelli =

FBI agent

Luis Fraticelli is the second Puerto Rican to have served as Special-Agent-in-Charge of the Federal Bureau of Investigation's San Juan Field Office. During his 7-year tenure, which ended in June 2011 when he took new responsibilities at FBI headquarters in Washington, D.C., he became the most visible face in the Federal fight against public and political corruption in Puerto Rico. The investigations he led helped indict a sitting Governor, Aníbal Acevedo Vilá, who was later acquitted, and convict two sitting senators, Jorge De Castro Font and Héctor Martínez Maldonado, among others.

Fraticelli, born in 1961, is a native of Fort Leonard Wood, Missouri, where his father was serving in the United States Army and relocated to his parents' native Puerto Rico when he was 10 years old. A graduate of Gabriela Mistral High School in San Juan and earned his bachelor's degree in Business Administration at the University of Puerto Rico's main campus in Río Piedras in 1984. He began his FBI career that same year, completed initial training at the FBI Academy in Quantico, Virginia. Was assigned serving to El Paso, Texas. From 1988 until 1995 he served as a special agent in San Juan, after which he was promoted to a supervisory role at FBI headquarters in Washington, D.C. He was assigned to the Phoenix, Arizona where he supervised the Phoenix division Joint Drug Intelligence Group from 1997 to 2000. Later he was named assistant special agent in-charge at the Dallas, Texas Field Office. His qualifications and certifications, Counterterrorism Executive Leadership Certificate from the United States Military Academy, Leading Strategic Change at the Kellogg School of Management, Northwestern University and Managing Change at University of California, Berkeley.

Before his appointment in April 2004 as Special Agent in charge for Puerto Rico and the United States Virgin Islands, Fraticelli once again served two years in Washington, D.C as Section Chief, Criminal Investigative Division, and two months as acting Special Agent in Charge in Puerto Rico for two months in 2002. In 2010 Luis Fraticelli was given a Presidential Rank Award.
