= Danny Heatley (musician) =

British musician

Dan (Drummie Dan) Heatley
- Other name: Drummie Dan
- Occupation: Musician

Dan (Drummie Dan) Heatley is a British musician. He played drums for a band called Shane MacGowan and The Popes.

== Musical history ==
Previously, Dan Heatley played drums for The Satellites, The Exploited, The Boothill Foot-Tappers, The Men They Couldn't Hang, Blubbery Hellbellies, Lucky Saddles, Auntie & The Men From Uncle, Cat People, Brian James Dripping Lips, Shane MacGowan & The Popes, The Pogues, DubCats, Creation Rockers, and many more besides. Currently living in Lyttelton, New Zealand, he plays drums with various Lyttelton and Christchurch NZ musicians, has two sons and is working on his own material.

Heatley is currently playing drums with bands in New Zealand.

Dan Heatley is the son of Spike Heatley, internationally known double bassist.
