= Danny McNamara =

Danny McNamara may refer to:

- Danny McNamara (musician)
- Danny McNamara (footballer)
- Danny McNamara, a character from the TV series Blood & Treasure

== See also ==
- Daniel McNamara, Australian politician
- Dan McNamara, American artist and humorist
