= Danny Bakker =

Danny Bakker may refer to:

- Danny Bakker (footballer, born 16 January 1995), Dutch footballer
- Danny Bakker (footballer, born 25 January 1995), Dutch footballer
