= Daniel Graham (disambiguation) =

Daniel Graham (born 1978) is an American football player.

Daniel Graham may also refer to:

- Bob Graham (1936–2024), Daniel Robert Graham, American politician
- Daniel O. Graham (1926–1995), American general and political activist
- Danny Graham (footballer) (born 1985), English footballer
- Danny Graham (Halifax, Nova Scotia politician), Canadian politician from Nova Scotia
- Danny Graham (Cape Breton politician) (born 1950), former Member of the Legislative Assembly of Nova Scotia, Canada
- Dan Graham (1942–2022), American conceptual artist
- Dan Graham (baseball) (born 1954), Major League Baseball catcher
- Daniel Graham (apothecary) (c. 1695–1778), apothecary to King George II, King George III and Chelsea College Hospital
- Daniel McBride Graham (died 1888), Free Will Baptist pastor, abolitionist, writer and inventor
- Daniel Graham (rower) (born 1999), British world champion rower
- Daniel Graham, one of the two men who were convicted of cutting down the Sycamore Gap tree in September 2023
