= Danny Barrett =

Danny Barrett may refer to:

- Danny Barrett (American football) (born 1961), American football player
- Danny Barrett (rugby union) (born 1990), American rugby union player

== See also ==
- Daniel Barrett (disambiguation)
