= E-patient =

Person receiving health information online

An e-patient is a health consumer who participates fully in their own medical care, primarily by gathering information about medical conditions that impact them and their families, using the Internet and other digital tools. The term encompasses those who seek guidance for their own ailments, and the friends and family members who research on their behalf. E-patients report two effects of their health research: "better health information and services, and different, but not always better, relationships with their doctors."

E-patients are active in their care and demonstrate the power of the participatory medicine or Health 2.0 / Medicine 2.0. model of care. The "e" can stand for "electronic" but has also been used to refer to other terms, such as "equipped", "enabled", "empowered" and "expert".

The current state of knowledge on the impact of e-patients on the healthcare system and the quality of care received indicates:

- A growing number of people say the internet played a crucial or important role as they helped another person cope with a major illness.
- Many clinicians underestimated the benefits and overestimated the risks of online health resources for patients.
- Medical online support groups are an important healthcare resource.
- "The net friendliness of clinicians and provider organizations—as rated by the e-patients they serve—is becoming an important new aspect of health care quality."
- According to one study, the advent of patients as partners is one of the most important cultural medical revolutions of the past century.
- In order to understand the impact of the e-patient, clinicians will likely need to move beyond "pre-internet medical constructs".
- Medical education must adapt to take the e-patient into account, and to prepare students for medical practice that includes the e-patient.

A 2011 study of European e-patients found that they tended to be "inquisitive and autonomous" and that they noted that the number of e-patients in Europe appeared to be rising. A 2012 study found that e-patients uploading videos about their health experienced a loss of privacy, but also positive benefits from social support. A later 2017 study utilizing social network analysis found that when e-patients are included in health care conferences, they increase information flow, expand propagation, and deepen engagement in the conversation of tweets when compared to both physicians and researchers while only making up 1.4% of the stakeholder mix.

== Non-English translations and adaptations of "e-patient" ==
=== Japan ===
According to Maho Isono, PhD, at the International University of Health and Welfare in Ōtawara, Japan, the term closest to e-patient in Japanese is tojisha-kenkyu, where "kenkyu means study, investigation and research" and "tojisha refers to interested persons, disabled persons themselves or patients themselves."

=== Sweden ===
Inspired by the seminal work on e-patients by Tom Ferguson and the e-Patients Scholars Working Group, Swedish patient and engineer Sara Riggare coined a new Swedish word, "spetspatient", meaning "lead user patient" or "lead patient", in February 2016.

== See also ==
- Doctor–patient relationship
- eHealth
- mHealth
- Patient opinion leader
- Treatment decision support
- Virtual patient
