= Danny Newall =

Welsh footballer

Personal information
- Full name: Danny Newall
- Date of birth: 5 June 1921
- Place of birth: Newport, Wales
- Date of death: 6 March 1997 (aged 75)
- Position: Wing half

Youth career
- Melrose Stars

Senior career*
Years	Team	Apps	(Gls)
1938–1955	Newport County	236	(4)
- * Club domestic league appearances and goals

Danny Newall (1921–1997) was a Welsh professional footballer. A wing half, he progressed through the youth team at Newport County making his first team debut in 1938. He went on to make 236 appearances for Newport, scoring 4 goals between 1938 and 1955.
