= Danny McEvoy =

Australian cricketer

Personal information
- Full name: Daniel Michael McEvoy
- Born: 19 August 1946 (age 80); Mount Lawley, Western Australia
- Batting: Right-handed
- Role: Batsman

Domestic team information
- Years: Team
- 1966/67: Western Australia

Career statistics
Competition	First-class
Matches	2
Runs scored	40
Batting average	13.33
100s/50s	0/0
Top score	28
Catches/stumpings	3/–
- Source: CricketArchive, 11 January 2013

Daniel Michael McEvoy (born 19 August 1946) is a former Australian cricketer, who played twice for Western Australia during the 1966–67 season. From Perth, both of McEvoy's matches at first-class level came during that season's Sheffield Shield. Serving as a middle-order replacement for Derek Chadwick, his debut came against New South Wales in December 1966. In the match, played at the WACA Ground, he scored 28 runs in the first innings, putting on a 68-run partnership with Ian Brayshaw for the sixth wicket, but was dismissed for a duck in the second innings. McEvoy's form was sufficient to gain selection in the next Sheffield Shield match, against Queensland later that month. He scored 12 runs in Western Australia's only innings, with Colin Milburn, John Inverarity, and Murray Vernon all making centuries in the team's win by an innings and 118 runs. Despite being only 20 years old at the time of his debut, McEvoy did not play at state level again, although he did play several matches for state colts teams in the following seasons.
