= Danny Vasquez =

American soccer player (born 1985)

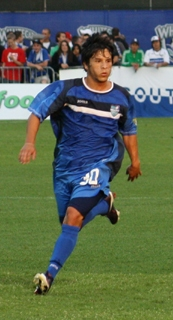

Personal information
- Full name: Danny Vasquez
- Date of birth: December 1, 1985 (age 40)
- Place of birth: Miami, Florida, United States
- Height: 5 ft 9 in (1.75 m)
- Position: Defender

Team information
- Current team: Miami FC
- Number: 30

College career
Years	Team	Apps	(Gls)
2004–2007	FIU Golden Panthers		

Senior career*
Years	Team	Apps	(Gls)
2009	Miami FC	9	(0)
- * Club domestic league appearances and goals as of 22 October 2009

Danny Vasquez (born December 3, 1985, in Miami, Florida) is an American soccer player who last played for Miami FC in the USL First Division.

== Career ==
=== College and amateur ===
Vasquez played club soccer for standout youth team West Kendall Optimist, being named U15 MVP of the 2000 SYL season after scoring twice in the championship match. He was also a stand out player for Miami Gulliver Preparatory. He later played college soccer at Florida International University.

=== Professional ===
Unsigned by pro teams out of college, Vasquez played subsequently with a number of Florida-based amateur teams, including Alemannia Aixpress and Soccer Locker.

Vasquez signed with Miami FC of the USL First Division in 2009. He made his professional debut on May 16, 2009, coming on as a substitute in Miami's game against Carolina RailHawks.

=== International ===
Vasquez had played with several US youth national teams.
