= Danny van der Ree =

Dutch footballer

Personal information
- Date of birth: 21 September 1988 (age 38)
- Place of birth: The Hague, Netherlands
- Height: 1.79 m (5 ft 10 in)
- Position: Defender

Team information
- Current team: DHC Delft

Youth career
- DHC Delft
- TONEGIDO
- FK AS Trenčín
- Willem II
- ADO Den Haag

Senior career*
Years	Team	Apps	(Gls)
2010	ADO Den Haag	0	(0)
2010–	DHC Delft		
- * Club domestic league appearances and goals as of 14:15, 23 July 2010 (UTC)

Danny van der Ree (born 21 September 1988) is a Dutch professional footballer who currently plays as a defender for DHC Delft.

== Club career ==
He played 3 matches for FK AS Trenčín on an exchange from TONEGIDO in 2008. Van der Ree comes from ADO Den Haag's own youth squad and won his first professional contract for the 2010–11 season.
