= Sloppy the Psychotic =

- DVD cover
- Directed by: Mike O'Mahony
- Written by: Mike O'Mahony; Erich Ficke
- Produced by: Mike O'Mahony; Erich Ficke
- Starring: Mike O'Mahony; James Costa; Lauren Ojeda; Lewis Beaver; Norm Copsetta Jr. Stacey Fitzpatrick; Fred Ficke
- Cinematography: Mike O'Mahony
- Edited by: Rob Nawrocki
- Music by: James Costa
- Production company: Maniac Films
- Distributed by: Maniac Films
- Release date: February 25, 2012 (United States)
- Running time: 77 minutes
- Country: United States
- Language: English

Sloppy the Psychotic is a 2012 American independent horror film directed, co-written, produced and cinematographed by Mike O'Mahony (who also stars in the film as the title role, along with James Costa who is the film's music composer) which follows a children's birthday party clown who suffers a mental breakdown and embarks on a psychotic killing spree. The film also stars Lauren Ojeda, Lewis Beaver, Norm Copsetta Jr., Stacey Fitzpatrick and Fred Ficke. Sloppy the Psychotic was theatrically released in the United States on February 25, 2012 by Maniac Films.

== Synopsis ==
Sloppy (Mike O'Mahony) is a children's birthday party clown who has had a terrible time of life. His girlfriend has broken up with him, he's been fired, and his friends are unsupportive and cruel. This proves to be too much for him and he undergoes a psychotic break, which causes him to go on a murdering spree.

== Cast ==
- Mike O'Mahony as Sloppy the Clown
- James Costa as Danny
- Lauren Ojeda as Sandy
- Lewis Beaver as Mr. Jenkins
- Stacey Fitzpatrick as Sheryl
- Fred Ficke as Bum
- Norm Copsetta Jr. as Mime

== Release ==
Sloppy the Psychotic was theatrically released in the United States on February 25, 2012 by Maniac Films.

== Reception ==
Ain't It Cool News gave a mostly positive review for the film, writing "While there are a lot of obvious jokes and bad acting, for no budget, this has some pretty twisted moments. Plus there’s the added benefit of clown sex, which is always amusing. All in all, as far as sleaze goes, SLOPPY THE PSYCHOTIC is better than most no-budgeters." HorrorNews.net was more negative in their review, stating "Mike O’Mahony made the type of film that he wanted to make on his own terms. For that I will applaud him. For me, I just couldn’t connect to the material and enjoy it."

== Music ==
The music for Sloppy the Psychotic was composed by James Costa. The film features songs including:

- "Murder Stories" - Nettles
- "Alone" - Polterchrist
- "Engulfed by the Swarm" - Polterchrist
- "Cold Sweat and Butterfly's" - Old Man Savage
- "Hell's Embrace" - Old Man Savage
- "Pop Goes The Weasel" - Kevin MacLeod
- "Scheming Weasel" - Kevin MacLeod
- "Cuz I Got Paper (You Wish You Had)" - Fallacious and G-Rex
- "I'm Gone" - Fallacious
