= Danny Dahill =

American lawyer and legislator

Dan "Danny" Dahill (September 28, 1919 – April 15, 2013) was an American lawyer and legislator.

Born in Glen Jean, West Virginia, Dahill served in the United States Marine Corps during World War II. He graduated from the University of Notre Dame and received his law degree from West Virginia University College of Law. He practiced law in West Logan, West Virginia and was the city attorney. He served in the West Virginia House of Delegates (from 1957 to 1961) and in the State Senate (from 1961 to 1964).

Dahill died in Huntington, West Virginia, aged 93.
