= Danny Key =

English footballer

Personal information
- Full name: Daniel Charles Key
- Date of birth: 2 November 1977
- Place of birth: Darlington, County Durham, England
- Height: 5 ft 7 in (1.70 m)
- Position: Midfielder

Senior career*
Years	Team	Apps	(Gls)
1996–1997	Darlington	3	(0)
1997	→ Waterford United (loan)		
1997	Gateshead	8	(0)
–	Spennymoor Town		
1998–2000	Crook Town		
2000–2002	Whitby Town		
2002–2005	Shildon		
2005–2008	West Auckland Town		
2008–20??	Darlington Railway Athletic		
- * Club domestic league appearances and goals

Daniel Charles Key (born 2 November 1977) is an English former footballer who played as a midfielder in the Football League for Darlington, spent time on loan with League of Ireland club Waterford United, and played non-league football for a variety of clubs in the north-east of England.

== Life and career ==
Key was born in Darlington, County Durham, and began his football career as a youth trainee with his hometown club, Darlington F.C. He made his Football League debut on 15 October 1996, as a late substitute in a 2–0 defeat away to Cardiff City in the Third Division. He appeared twice more in the Third Division, each time as a late substitute in a defeat, and once in the 1996–97 FA Cup, starting the match against non-league club Runcorn which Darlington won 4–1. He spent time on loan with League of Ireland club Waterford United in early 1997, and finished the season with Gateshead, for whom he played eight games in the Conference.

He went on to play non-league football for Crook Town, Spennymoor United, Whitby Town, Shildon, – whom he captained to the first round proper of the 2003–04 FA Cup, in which they faced Notts County, – West Auckland Town, and Darlington Railway Athletic.

Key was a member of the Coundon Conservative Club team that won the 2007 FA Sunday Cup.
