= Danny Hegarty =

Australian rules footballer

Personal information
- Full name: Danny Hegarty
- Born: 14 August 1944 (age 82)
- Original team: Marcellin College
- Height: 178 cm (5 ft 10 in)
- Weight: 73 kg (161 lb)

Playing career^{1}
Years	Club	Games (Goals)
1963	Hawthorn	1 (0)
- ^{1} Playing statistics correct to the end of 1963.

Danny Hegarty (born 14 August 1944) is a former Australian rules footballer who played with Hawthorn in the Victorian Football League (VFL).
