= Danny Ray =

Danny Ray may refer to:

- Danny Ray (saxophonist) (born 1951), American saxophonist
- Danny Ray (singer) (born c. 1951), Jamaican-born UK-based singer and record producer
- Danny Ray (MC) (1935–2021), James Brown's personal valet and master of ceremonies
