= Danny McKelvie =

Scotland international rugby league footballer

Daniel McKelvie
Personal information
- Full name: Daniel McKelvie
- Born: 10 October 1969 (age 55)

Playing information
- Position: Prop, Second-row
Club
| Years | Team | Pld | T | G | FG | P |
|---|---|---|---|---|---|---|
| 1991–94 | Hunslet | 29 | 3 | 0 | 0 | 12 |
| 1994–98 | Dewsbury Rams | 107 | 17 | 0 | 0 | 68 |
| | Total | 136 | 20 | 0 | 0 | 80 |
Representative
| Years | Team | Pld | T | G | FG | P |
| 1997 | Scotland | 1 | 0 | 0 | 0 | 0 |

Daniel "Danny" McKelvie (born 10 October 1969) is a former professional rugby league footballer who played in the 1990s. He played at representative level for Scotland, and at club level for Hunslet and Dewsbury Rams, as a prop or second-row forward.

== International honours ==
Danny McKelvie won a cap for Scotland while at Dewsbury Rams in 1997 against France (sub).
