= Danny Fraticelli =

Puerto Rican musician

- Born: San Juan, Puerto Rico.
- Occupations: Musician; singer; actor
- Years active: 1993–present

Danny Fraticelli is a Puerto Rican musician, singer and actor. Fraticelli has appeared in many local, international movies and Soap Operas. On his music career, he was the front singer of the Puerto Rican rock band Niño Planeta. He left the band shortly after the band released an album under Universal Records in 2004 "No Hay Vuelta Atrás". In 2009 he released a solo album called En Libertad. Danny Fraticelli also is a graduated psychologist..

2019, Danny Frati Celli made a compilation of studio sessions, and gather them in one album called: 'Sesiones: 2004–2014".
