= Danny Jung =

Danish footballer and manager (born 1971)

Personal information
- Date of birth: 5 August 1971 (age 55)
- Place of birth: Copenhagen, Denmark
- Position: Forward

Team information
- Current team: FC Helsingør (U19 head coach)

Youth career
- B93
- Frem

Senior career*
Years	Team	Apps	(Gls)
1991–1993	B93		
1993	Frem	11	(4)
1994	B93		
1994–1998	Herfølge BK	69	(14)
1998	→ B93 (loan)		
1998–1999	Vejle BK	29	(4)
2000–2002	B93		
2002–2004	Ølstykke FC	41	(22)
2004	B93		

Managerial career
- 2004–2005: B93
- 2005–2006: Frem (assistant)
- 2006–2007: Køge Boldklub (assistant)
- 2007–2016: Denmark women U16 & U17
- 2017: Frem
- 2018–2019: B93
- 2020–: FC Helsingør (U19)
- * Club domestic league appearances and goals

Danny Jung (born 5 August 1971) is a Danish former football player and current manager of FC Helsingør's U19s.

== Career ==
Jung played at several Danish Superliga clubs. He had five spells at his childhood club B93 representing the club 91 times and scoring 33 goals.

In 2004, he became joint manager of B93 with Dan Lübbers. He lasted eight months in that job.

In November 2016 he was made new manager of Boldklubben Frem effective from January 2017. He left in August 2017 on mutual consent following a bad start to the 2017–18 season.

In December 2017 it was announced that Jung would return as manager of B93 in January 2018. He left the club in November 2019. On 30 June 2020, he was appointed head coach of FC Helsingør's U19 team.
