= Danny Epps =

American musician

Danny Epps (May 14, 1941 in Lufkin, Texas – October 29, 2007 in Houston, Texas) was a Columbia Records, Crazy Cajun Records and StarPlay Records artist.

His last album, Rumors Of The Truth, was recorded in 2006 for the indie label StarPlay Records. Mickey Newbury, writing in the liner notes for Epps' first Columbia album described him as "another Texas songwriter from the mold of Willie Nelson, Kris Kristofferson, Townes Van Zandt, Dennis Linde, and Gene Thomas"

Danny toured with legendary performers Billy Joe Shaver and Bobby Bare. He wrote hundreds of songs recorded by many notable performers, including Freddy Fender, Don Gibson, Brenda Lee, Dickey Lee, Johnny Lee, Roger Miller and many others. His style of music has been described as Blues, Folk and Country; at times all three.

Danny Epps served as a Marine in Vietnam and after discharge worked for several years with Delta Air Lines at Houston, Texas. He left that company in 1970 for his number one love, music. He worked as a studio musician, producer, and songwriter for Crazy Cajun Music and recorded one album, Laid Back Country Picker for that company. After fronting several country bands in the late 60s in the Houston area, Danny moved to Nashville where he wrote for several publishing houses and worked as a studio musician, playing guitar and harmonica on several major albums. He recorded his first Columbia album, Danny Epps in 1972. After several years of songwriting and recording in Nashville and touring with his own band Danny gave up music for fifteen years and worked in construction around the country. He returned to Houston (and to music) in 1999. Danny recorded his last album, Rumors of the Truth, for StarPlay Records in 2005.

In a 2008 Epps retrospective for the magazine No Depression, columnist Lloyd Sachs wrote of Epps, "His plainspoken, marginally inflected vocals, reminiscent of Billy Joe Shaver's, have an appealing directness. ...Epps comes across as a nowhere man looking for somewhere to ease his hurts."
