= Danny Sands =

American doctor (born 1962)

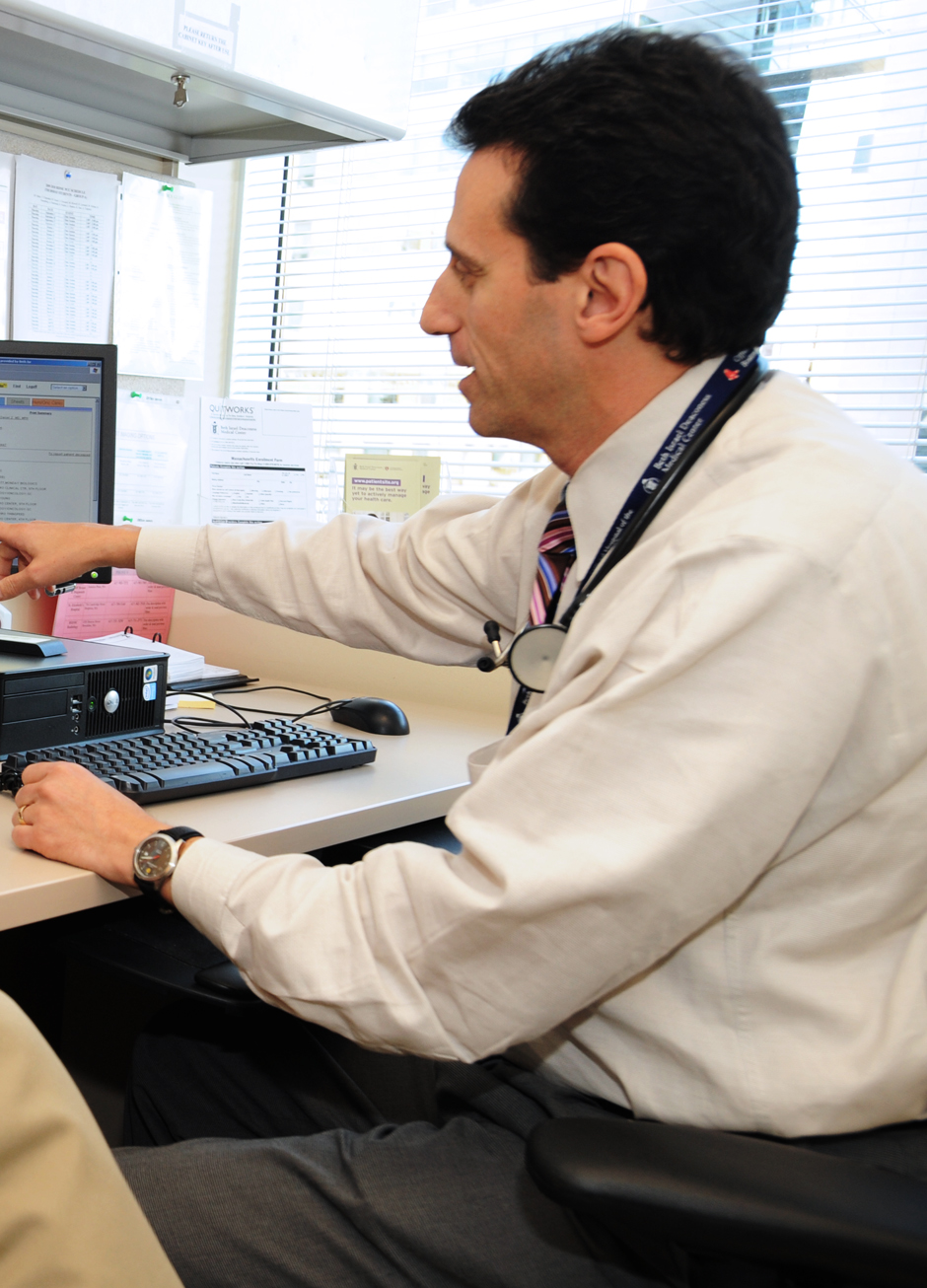
- Dr. Sands at screen of his medical record system
- Born: Daniel Zev Sands; April 1962 (age 64)
- Education: Brown University; The Ohio State University College of Medicine; Harvard School of Public Health
- Occupation: Primary care physician

Daniel Zev Sands, M.D., M.P.H., professionally known as Danny Sands, is an American primary care physician and specialist in medical informatics. He is a co-founder of the Society for Participatory Medicine, of which he is the Board Chair.

== Awards and honors ==
- William F. Ashe Award from the Department of Preventive Medicine for his work with computers as systems operator of Black Bag II BBS, a computerized medical information system, Ohio State University College of Medicine (1988).
- President’s Award, American Medical Informatics Association (1998).
- 2001 Technical Paper of the Year, Health Information Management Systems Society, for paper about PatientSite (2002).
- IT Innovator Award from Healthcare Informatics magazine (a McGraw-Hill publication) (2003).
- 20 People Who Make Healthcare Better - Health Leaders magazine, 2009.

== Memberships ==
Dr. Sands has been elected to fellowships in both the American College of Physicians and the American College of Medical Informatics and is a founder and co-chair of the Society for Participatory Medicine.

== Publications ==
A Model for the Future of Health Care, Journal of Participatory Medicine, 5/16/2013
