= Dane (name) =

Dane is both a surname and a given name of Dutch, Irish, English, Danish and Hungarian origin. Notable people with the name include:

== Surname ==
- Alexandra Dane (born 1940s), South African actress
- Barbara Dane (1927–2024), American singer
- Dana Dane (born 1965), American hip-hop artist
- Elisabeth Dane (1903–1984), German biochemist
- Eric Dane (1972–2026), American actor
- Francis Dane (1615–1697), minister in colonial Massachusetts during the Salem Witch Trials
- Hugh Dane (1942–2018), American actor
- Jax Dane (ring name; 1976–2024), American wrestler
- Jordan Dane (born 1953), American novelist
- Joseph Dane (1778–1858), American congressman from Maine
- Karl Dane (1886–1934), Danish-born American silent film actor
- Lloyd Dane (1925–2015), American race car driver
- Maxwell Dane (1906–2004), American advertising executive
- Nathan Dane (1752–1835), American lawyer and statesman representing Massachusetts in the Continental Congress from 1785 to 1787
- Patricia Dane (1919–1995), American film actress
- Warrel Dane (1961–2017), American singer

== Given name ==
- Dane Acker (born 1999), American baseball player
- Dane Anderson (born 1984), Australian cricket player
- Dane Baptiste (born 1984), British stand-up comedian and writer
- Dane Beesley (born 1978), Australian photographer
- Dane Belton (born 1999), American football player
- Dane Bird-Smith (born 1992), Australian racewalking athlete
- Dane Blacker (born 1998), Welsh rugby union player
- Dane Boedigheimer (born 1978), American filmmaker, singer, and actress
- Dane Boswell (born 1984), New Zealand rower
- Dane Bowers (born 1979), British singer and member of 5th Story, formerly of Another Level
- Dane Byers (born 1986), Canadian professional ice hockey player
- Dane Cameron (born 1988), American racing driver
- Dane Campbell (born 1984), Australian rugby league administrator and former footballer
- Dane Carlaw (born 1980), Australian former professional rugby league footballer
- Dane Chanase (1894–1975), American painter and printmaker
- Dane Chisholm (born 1990), Australian Rugby League player
- Dane Clark (1912–1998), American character actor
- Dane Cleaver (born 1992), New Zealand first-class cricketer
- Dane Coles (born 1986), New Zealand rugby union player
- Dane Cook (born 1972), American stand-up comic and actor
- Dane Coolidge (1873–1940), American author, naturalist, and photographer
- Dane Cruikshank (born 1995), American football player
- Dane Currency (born 1985), Barbadian cricketer
- Dane Damron, American football coach and former player
- Dane Dastillung (1897–1982), American football player
- Dane Davis, American sound editor
- Dane De La Rosa (born 1983), American professional baseball player
- Dane DeHaan (born 1986), American actor
- Dane DiLiegro (born 1988), American actor, stuntman, and former professional basketball player
- Dane Dobbie (born 1986), Canadian professional lacrosse player
- Dane Dorahy (born 1977), Australian former professional rugby league footballer
- Dane Dukić (born 1981), Serbian former footballer
- Dane Dunning (born 1994), American professional baseball player
- Dane Eagle (born 1983), American politician
- Dane Elkins (born 1999), American professional racquetball player
- Dane Evans (born 1993), American professional Canadian football player
- Dane Fife (born 1979), American former college basketball player and current assistant coach
- Dane Fischer (born 1979), American basketball coach
- Dane Fletcher (born 1986), American former football player
- Dane Fox (born 1993), Canadian professional ice hockey player
- Dane Gagai (born 1991), Australian professional rugby league footballer
- Dane Haylett-Petty (born 1989), Australian retired rugby union footballer
- Dane Hogan (born 1989), Australian professional rugby league footballer
- Dane Hussey (born 1949), American weightlifter
- Dane Hutchinson (born 1986), New Zealand cricketer
- Dane Hyatt (born 1984), Jamaican sprinter
- Dane Ingham (born 1999), New Zealand professional footballer
- Dane Iorg (born 1950), American retired MLB player
- Dane Jackson (disambiguation), multiple people
- Dane Johnson (born 1963), American former professional baseball coach and former pitcher
- Dane Kelly (born 1991), Jamaican professional footballer
- Dane Korica (born 1945), Serbian retired long-distance runner
- Dane Krager (born 1979), American former football player
- Dane Kuprešanin (born 1966), Bosnian-Herzegovinian retired footballer
- Dane Laffrey, American scenic designer and costume designer
- Dane Lanken (1945–2023), Canadian journalist and author
- Dane Lett (born 1990), New Zealand field hockey player
- Dane Lloyd (born 1991), Canadian politician
- Dane Looker (born 1976), American former football player
- Dane Lovett (born 1984), Australian artist
- Dane Lussier (1909–1959), American screenwriter
- Dane Manning (born 1989), English professional rugby league footballer
- Dane Massey (born 1988), Irish professional footballer
- Dane McDonald (born 1987), Australian rugby league player
- Dane Menzies (born 2005), New Zealand snowboarder
- Dane A. Miller (c. 1946–2015), American business executive
- Dane Milovanović (born 1989), Australian footballer
- Dane Morgan (born 1979), Australian former rugby league footballer
- Dane Murphy (born 1986), American retired soccer player
- Dane Murray (born 2003), Scottish professional footballer
- Dane Neller (born 1956), American businessman and entrepreneur
- Dane Nielsen (born 1985), Australian former professional rugby league footballer
- Dane O'Hara (born 1953), New Zealand former rugby league footballer
- Dane O'Neill, Irish jockey
- Dane Rampe (born 1990), Australian rules footballer
- Dane Randolph (born 1986), American former football player
- Dane Rauschenberg (born 1976), American long-distance runner and author
- Dane Rawlins (born 1956), Irish dressage rider
- Dane Reynolds (born 1985), American professional surfer
- Dane Richards (born 1983), Jamaican former professional footballer
- Dane Rudhyar (1895–1985), French-born American author, modernist composer, and humanistic astrologer
- Dane Rumble (born 1982), New Zealand recording artist
- Dane Sampson (born 1986), Australian sports shooter
- Dane Sanzenbacher (born 1988), American former football player
- Dane Sardinha (born 1979), American former professional baseball catcher
- Dane Scarlett (born 2004), English professional footballer
- Dane Schadendorf (born 2002), Zimbabwean cricketer
- Dane Searls (1988–2011), Australian BMX rider
- Dane Sharp (disambiguation), multiple people
- Dane Sorensen (born 1955), New Zealand former rugby league footballer
- Dane Spencer (born 1977), American former ski racer
- Dane Stojanović, Serbian commander
- Dane Strother, American Democratic political strategist, media commentator, and former reporter
- Dane Suttle (born 1961), American former professional basketball player
- Dane Sweeny (born 2001), Australian professional tennis player
- Dane Tilse (born 1985), Australian former professional rugby league footballer
- Dane Trbović (born 1986), Serbian footballer
- Dane Tudor (born 1989), Australian-American freeskier
- Dane van Niekerk (born 1993), South African cricketer
- Dane Vilas (born 1985), South African cricketer
- Dane Waters (born 1964), political strategist, elephant protection advocate, writer, and direct democracy advocate
- Dane Weston (born 1973), Antiguan former cricketer
- Dane Whitehouse (born 1970), English former footballer
- Dane Witherspoon (1957–2014), American actor
- Dane Zajc (1929–2005), Slovenian poet and playwright
- Dane Zander, Australian rugby union player

== Fictional characters ==
- Dane (Wildstorm), a character from WildStorm Productions, now owned by DC Comics
- Dane of Elysium, the Wonder Man from DC Comics and male version of Diana of Themyscira, the Wonder Woman
- The Dane, a term for Prince Hamlet of Denmark, a character in Shakespeare's tragedy Hamlet
- Saint Dane, a character in the Pendragon series
- Lorna Dane (Polaris), a mutant character in Marvel Comics

== See also ==
- Danes (surname)
