= Vana =

Vana (or with diacrits, e.g. Váňa) may refer to:

- Vana (singer), alt metal artist from New Zealand
- Vana, Gujarat, a village on Saraushtra peninsula, western India
- Vana State, a former princely state whose seat was in Vana, Gujarat
- Vana, Iran, a village in Mazandaran Province, Iran
- Váňa, a Czech surname
- Vána, a fictional character from J. R. R. Tolkien's legendarium
- Vana, wife of the legendary Swedish king Sveigðir
- Vana Parva, a book of the Mahabharata
