= Great Dane (disambiguation) =

Great Dane is a breed of dog.

Great Dane or Great Danes may refer to:

== Sports ==
- Albany Great Danes, the athletic program of the University at Albany, Albany, New York State, USA
- AUF Great Danes, the varsity sports teams of Angeles University Foundation, Angeles City, Philippines
- Great Dane Handball Club, London, England, UK; former name of London GD Handball Club
- Great Dane, a racehorse, winner of the 1999 International Stakes (Ireland)

== Arts, entertainment, media ==
- "Great Dane", a season 3 episode of TV show Scaredy Squirrel
- Great Dane, an etching by Sybilla Mittell Weber

=== Music ===
- "Great Dane", a 2008 song by Mates of State off the album Re-Arrange Us
- "Great Dane", a 2017 song by Cosmo Pyke off the EP Just Cosmo

== Groups, organizations ==
- Great Dane Airlines, a Danish airline
- Great Dane Trailers, a U.S. manufacturer of commercial semitrailers
- Great Dane Brewing Company, Madison, Wisconsin, USA; see List of breweries in Wisconsin
- Great Dane Pub, Fess Hotel, Madison, Wisconsin, USA

== Other uses ==
- The Great Dane, a nickname and list of people using that nickname
- The Great Dane, a fictional character portrayed by Adam Pally from the U.S. TV show FUBAR (TV series)
- The Great Dane, Maywood, Illinois, USA; an ash tree, the oldest ash in Illinois
- Great Dane, La Silla Observatory, Coquimbo Region, Chile; a telescope operated by the European Southern Observatory

== See also ==
- Great (disambiguation)
- Dane (disambiguation)
- All pages with titles containing "Great" and "Dane"
