= Dane Sharp (singer-songwriter) =

Australian singer and songwriter

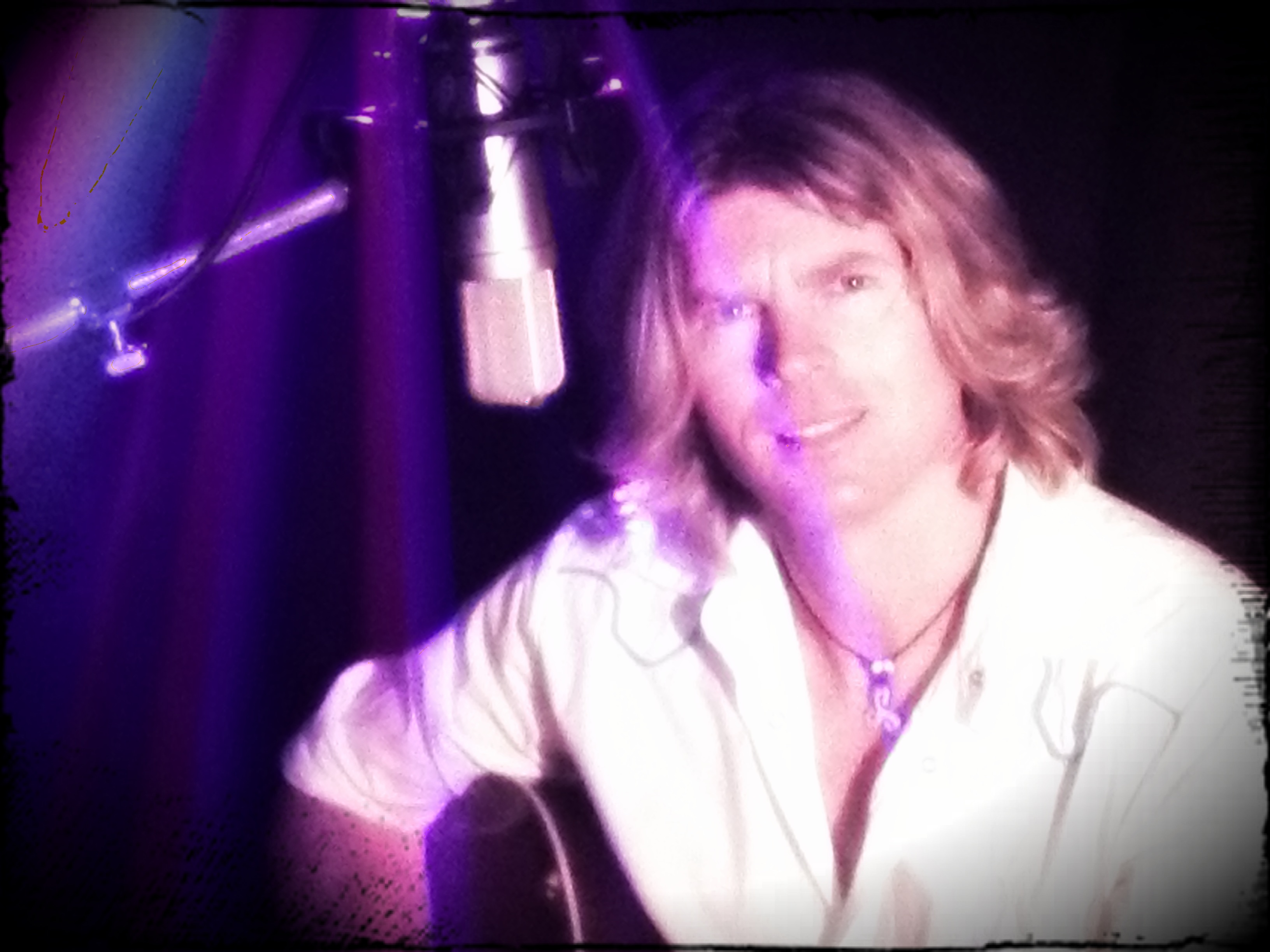
Dane Sharp recording 2014

Dane Sharp is an Australian singer/songwriter, filmmaker, writer and former professional soccer player. After signing a recording contract in 2007 with record label Touchwood Productions, Sharp began a business relationship with the Record Labels owner and producer Duncan Wood which has led to them working together on a variety of music and film productions.

Originally from the small New South Wales coastal town of Nelson Bay, Sharp's professional football career saw him play in England, Austria, United States and Australia until a series of serious knee injuries forced him into early retirement which lead him into the music and film business.

Touchwood Productions released Sharp's debut studio album Nothing To Lose in 2008 and released five radio singles in which four charted in the Top 40 country music charts with the single "One Way Ride" being the highest entry peaking at number 6. In Jan 2012 Dane was named Patron of Camp Autism Qld. In 2013 Sharp along with producer Duncan Wood wrote and recorded the theme song for the Australian National Deaf Soccer Team titled "Our Time to Fly" which was used as the theme song for the team at the Asian Pacific Football championships. On April 4, 2018 Sharp performed with Christine Anu and Mau Power at the Commonwealth Games opening ceremony as part of the Four Winds Didgeridoo Orchestra. In March 2023 Sharps hit single "When the Sun Goes Down" hit the number 1 position on the IMC Country charts. " Sharps second release in 2023 titled "What would you say" also reached number 1.

== Football career ==
Leaving Australia at 16 Sharp left to trial with English Premier League Club Queens Park Rangers on recommendation from ex QPR legend and scout Bobby Cameron who was living in Australia at the time. Sharp earned a six-month contract which saw him make 5 appearances for the reserve side which included a friendly against Canada. After six months the club sent Sharp to English third-tier side Plymouth Argyle until he ran into work permit problems forcing a return home to Australia.

After a season back in Australia with Sydney City an agent based in Vienna organised a trial in Austria which led to a 2-year contract with SV Horn where he was leading goalscorer with 38 goals. Returning to Australia after a season with NSL club Adelaide City Sharp had an unsuccessful spell in the USA with MISL team The Tacoma Stars before eventually being sold and transferred back to hometown club Newcastle. After a bright start, a series of serious knee injuries and a lengthy lay off later saw him reduced to only a squad player for the remainder of his contract, before being released. Moving to the WA State league for two seasons saw further knee injuries, which brought a premature end to his playing career. In January 2018, Sharp launched his own Football Technique Academy.

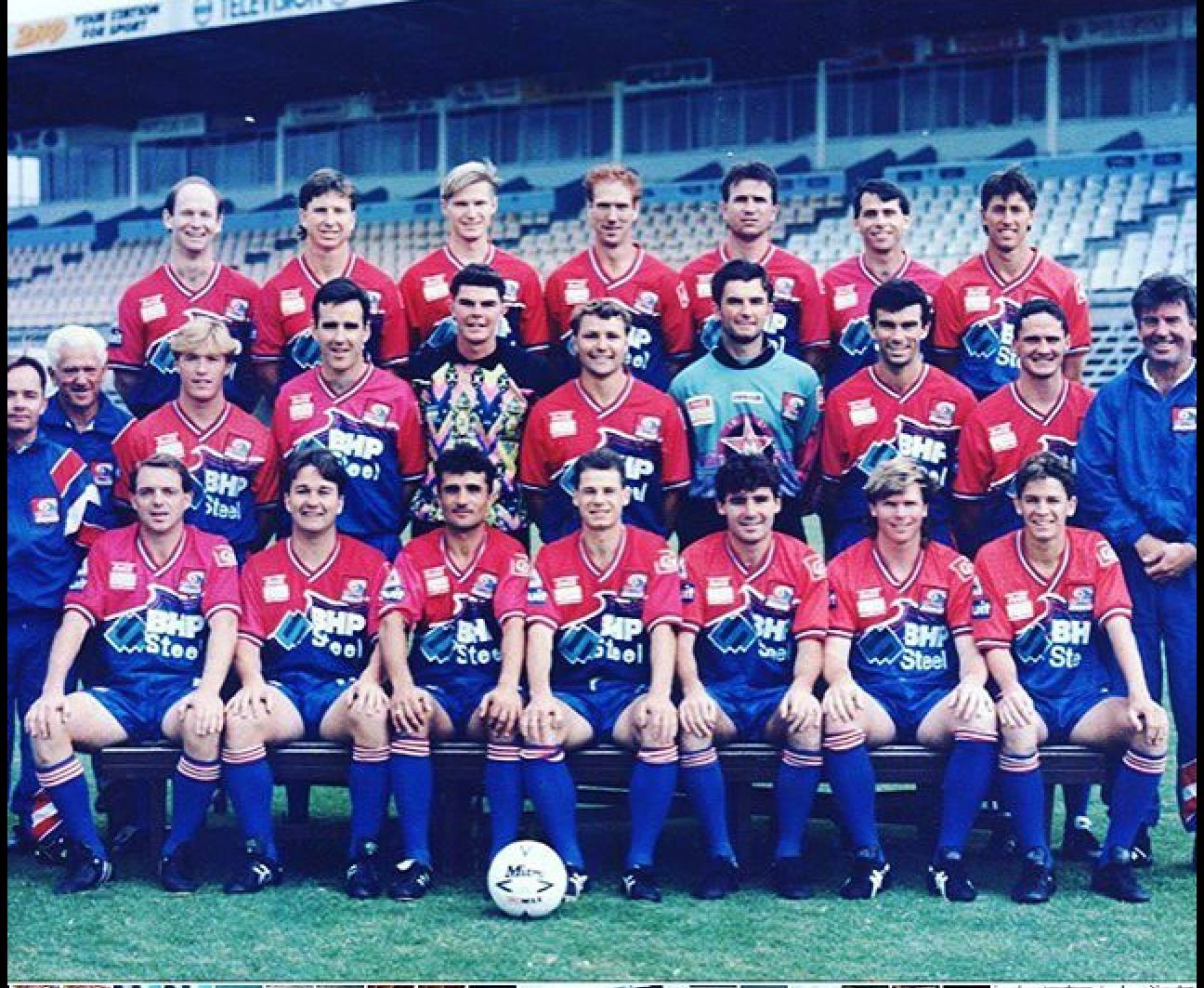
Dane Sharp second from right front row whilst playing for Newcastle Breakers FC

== Personal life ==
Sharp married Jacqui Wong a physio he met whilst playing for Newcastle at a ceremony on the Central Coast NSW in 2000. They have three boys Indigo, Tashi and Thierry and live in Tamborine Mountain in the Gold Coast Hinterland QLD. Dane is also the cousin of Peter Sharp the former NRL coach of Manly Sea Eagles and Cronulla Sharks.

== Music career ==
Playing Football professionally in Austria Sharp shared a unit with a Swedish interior designer and began guitar lessons not knowing at the time it would have a big influence on his music career. After suffering serious knee injuries back in Australia Sharp found time to concentrate on song writing and guitar. Several years were spent honing his skills playing bars, restaurants and pubs until making a decision to take out a loan in 2006 to cut an independent album.

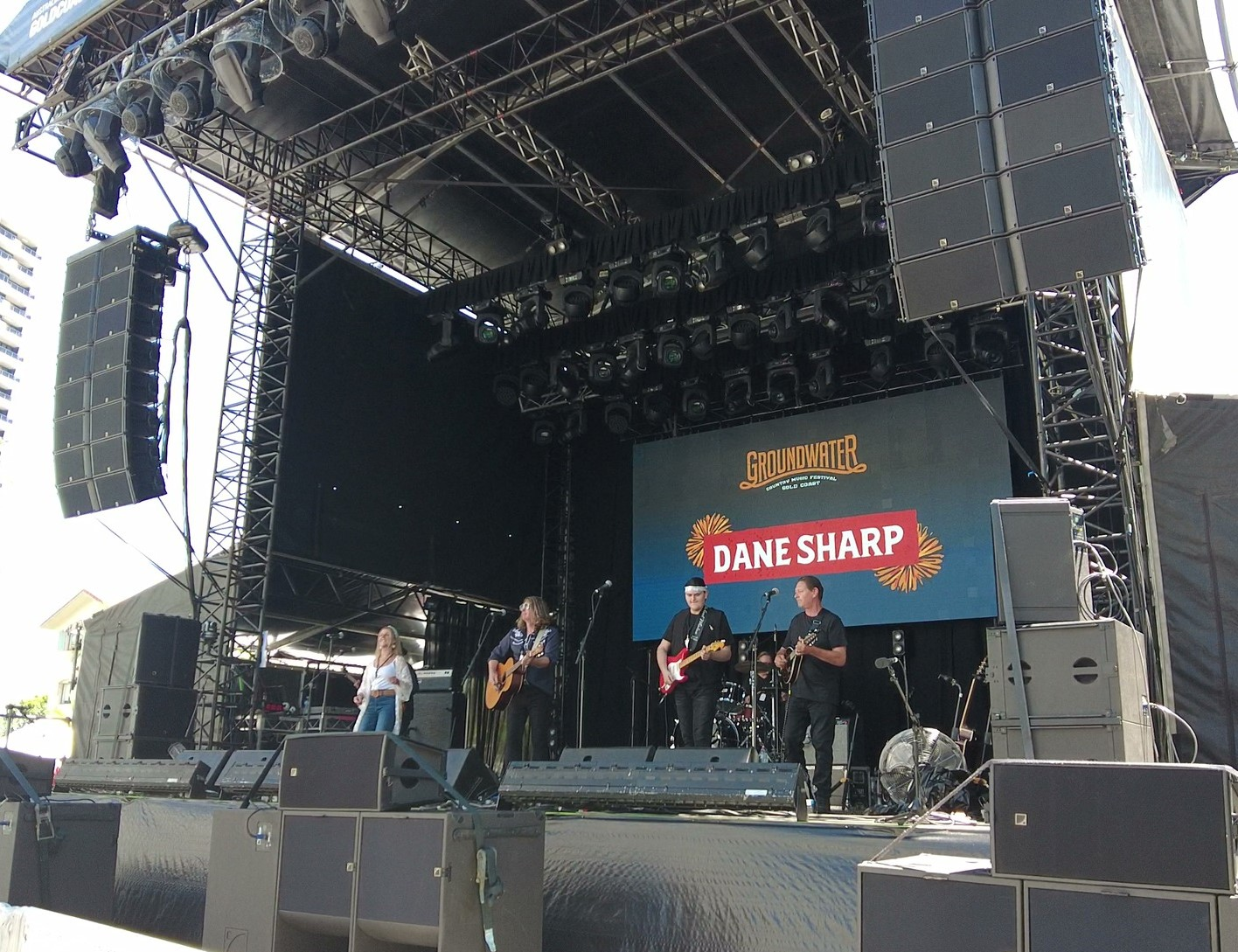
Dane Sharp Main Stage GWF

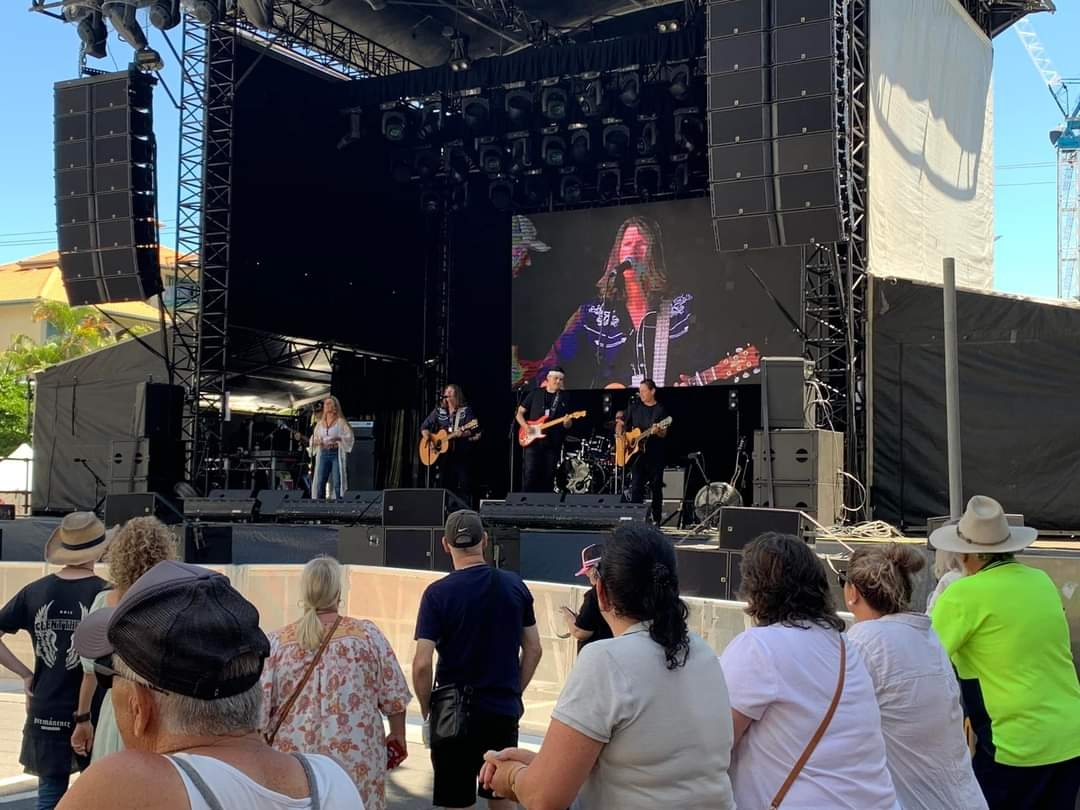
Dane Sharp Festival Performance 2022

A trip to Nashville, Tennessee to play and write the album at the same time by luck and chance saw Sharp perform on Tennessee TV to over one million viewers. On return Wood reworked the bulk of the record and Sharp's first studio album produced by Duncan Wood titled Nothing To Lose was released in Feb 2008 under the Touchwood label. Sharp continued to release material to radio up until 2014 before taking an extended break to concentrate on Film projects. In February 2018 saw the end of the hiatus with the release of Time for Love a duet with Caroline Taylor-Knight.

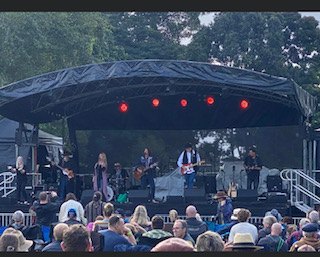
Dane Sharp Live

== Film/Documentary ==
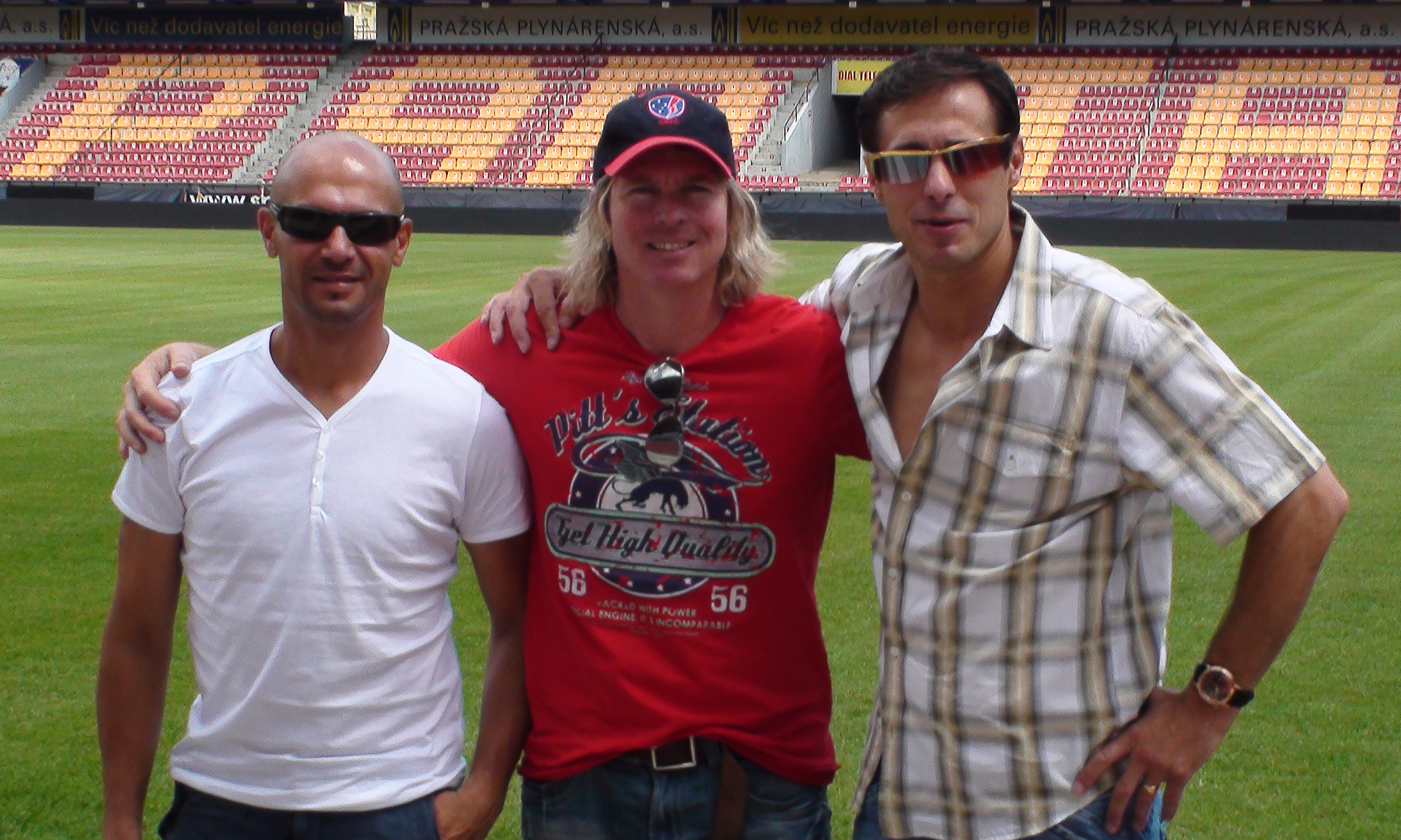
On film set in Prague for "The Turning Point of the Game" Documentary featuring Abbas Saad, Dane Sharp and Michal Vana

In 2010 Sharp and Touchwood producer Duncan Wood signed a contract to write and produce a controversial documentary titled The Abbas Saad Story which is a film on the life of Sharp's former colleague from Sydney City Abbas Saad who was caught up in one of the biggest match fixing scandals in Asian Football history and who was subsequently banned for life. The film also features several Ex-Socceroos including Fox Football pundit Andy Harper along with the world leading expert on Match Fixing Declan Hill.

"Film synopsis"

"The Abbas Saad Story" On the 20th anniversary of the Singapore Lions Football Team winning the Malaysia Cup in 1994 comes a story of one man's journey to find the truth and unlock a piece of history. Abbas Saad scored a hat trick in the 4 nil win over Pahang taking him to hero status which was to come crashing down a few months later when he was charged and banned for life for match fixing in one of Asian football's most controversial cases.

"The Abbas Saad Story" is a not only a biographical piece but the personal journey and search across the world for ex-team mate Michal Vana who to this day still sits in the top three of Singapore's most infamous fugitives. Michal Vana is the only man that knows the real truth behind the scandal but escaped Singapore amid the match fixing allegations which saw Abbas charged and banned for life. Not your usual Football story this is the journey to find the missing truth that would clear a man's name once and for all almost 20 years on.

"Film release and reception"

The film was released to critical acclaim and high ratings early 2015 and shown on Asian TV station Astro Supersport weekly for the month of March. Opinions with both the audience and media were divided as Sharp and producer Duncan Wood retraced the steps of the Abbas Saad scandal back to 1994 in an attempt to clear his name and show the origins of match fixing in world football today.

In a follow up to the Abbas Saad Story "A Football Fugitive The Michal Vana Story" was filmed on location in Prague in 2016 and is due for release in 2018. The upcoming film was the feature article for leading Football Magazine Four Four Two and in Feb 2018 was also the feature article by leading Czech newspaper Denik. The film features Czech Footballing legend Ladislav Vízek World Match fixing expert Declan Hill and Malaysian Football Star Scott Ollerenshaw.

"Film Synopsis"

"A Football Fugitive- The Michal Vana Story"

In 1993 a Czech Football star playing for Singapore was touted as the best foreign player to ever play in that region. By mid-season 1994 that player was arrested and facing prison for match fixing. And chose to illegally escape the country never to be seen again. 23 years later and still sitting in the top three fugitives in Singapore history that player said he never really had a choice.

His name is Michal Vana and this is his story.

"The Turning Point of the Game" brand which looks at offbeat and unusual football stories from around the world has been turned into an ongoing series and currently has further projects at various stages of production.

== Awards ==
Year	Organisation	Award	Result
2008	Qld Gold Medallion Awards	Best New Talent	Nominated
2008	Tamworth Country Music Awards	Best New Songwriter	Nominated
2009	Mildura National Country Music Awards	Best New Talent	Nominated
2009	Tamworth Fans Meet And Greet Awards	Best New Talent	Won
2010	Mildura National Country Music Awards	Independent Rising Star (Male)	Nominated
2010	Tamworth Fans Meet And Greet Awards	Most Popular Independent Male	Won
2011	Tamworth Fans Meet And Greet Awards	Most Popular Independent Male	Won

2023 Three Tamworth Songwriter nominations for When the Sun Goes Down, Green Grass Blue, Aussie Spirit.

2024 Dusty Boot Winner

== Side projects ==
In 2010, Sharp signed with Darren Scott's internet based Channel C as guest host.

In 2011, Touchwood Guitarist Don Macarthur and Sharp launched Sharpy's HBTV (Home Brew TV) 19 short episodes were filmed over two seasons from 2011 to 2013.

== Discography ==
=== Albums ===
- Nothing To Lose (2008)

=== Singles to radio ===
- Nothing To Lose
- Alone in the RSL
- Nashville Tennessee
- Blue Skies
- Another Star in the Sky
- One Way Ride Peaked at Number 6 on Hot Country Charts
- Time for Love A duet with Caroline Taylor-Knight
