= List of songs about Nashville, Tennessee =

This is a list of songs set in or referring to the city of Nashville, Tennessee that were written or performed by notable musicians.

== C ==
- "Crazy Town" by Jason Aldean, from Wide Open 2010, country rock ("sign says Nashville, Tennessee")
- "Congregation" by Foo Fighters ft. Zac Brown from Sonic Highways 2014

== D ==
- "Devil, Devil (Prelude: Princess of Darkness)" by Eric Church from The Outsiders 2014
- "Down on Music Row" by Dolly Parton
- "Dream Dream Dream" by Marty Stuart

== E ==
- "East Nashville Skyline" by Todd Snider

== G ==
- "Guitar Town" by Steve Earle
- "Greetings from Nashville" by Jason & the Scorchers

== H ==
- "Home" by Ben Rector

== I ==
- "It Can't Be Nashville Every Night" by The Tragically Hip
- "I Love This Town" by Bon Jovi
- "I Want" by Good Lovelies
- "I'm Going to Nashville" by Dane Sharp
- "I'm Movin' On" by Rascal Flatts (2001)

== L ==
- "Let's Go Burn Ole Nashville Down" by Jello Biafra
- "Lullaby" by Shawn Mullins

== N ==
- "Nashville" by David Mead
- "Nashville" by David Houston (written by Don Choate and Billy Sherrill)
- "Nashville" by the Indigo Girls
- "Nashville" by Pupo
- "Nashville" by Hoyt Axton
- "Nashville #1" by Audrey Auld Mezera
- "Nashville Blues" by The Delmore Brothers
- "Nashville Blues" by Earl Scruggs
- "Nashville Bum" by Waylon Jennings, from Nashville Rebel 1966
- "Nashville Cats" by The Lovin' Spoonful 1966
- "Nashville Grey Skies" by The Shires from England
- "Nashville Parthenon" by Casiotone for the Painfully Alone
- "The Nashville Scene" by Hank Williams Jr. from Five-O 1985
- "Nashville Rash" by Dale Watson
- "Nashville Skyline Rag" by Bob Dylan 1969, country rock from Nashville Skyline
- "Nashville West" by The Byrds
- "Nashville Winter" by Nick 13
- "Nashville Without You" by Tim McGraw
- "Never Goin' Back to Nashville" by John Stewart, The Lovin' Spoonful
- "No No Song" by Hoyt Axton, also sung by Ringo Starr

== M ==
- "Magic Town" by Marty Stuart
- "Murder on Music Row" by Larry Cordle

== S ==
- "Sally G" by Wings
- "South Nashville Blues" by Steve Earle
- "Strings of Nashville" by Pavement
- "Sundown in Nashville" by Marty Stuart

== W ==
- "Welcome to Nashville" by Halfway to Hazard
- "West Coast Kid" by Toby Mac
- "West Nashville Boogie" by Steve Earle
- "West Nashville Grand Ballroom Gown" by Jimmy Buffett
- "Woke up in Nashville" by Seth Ennis
