= Play the Game =

Play the Game may refer to:

- "Play the Game" (song), by Queen
- Play the Game (film), 2009 romantic comedy
- Play the Game (American game show), 1946
- Play the Game (Irish game show), 1984-1995
- Play the Game (NGO), non-governmental organization and conference on sports ethics
