= Danes (disambiguation) =

Danes are an ethnic group native to Denmark.

Danes may also refer to:

- Danes (surname), a family name
- Danes (tribe), an ancient North Germanic tribe
- Danes Island, an island in the Svalbard archipelago, Norway
- Daneș, a commune in Mureș County, Transylvania, Romania

== See also ==
- Dane (disambiguation)
