= Daane =

Daane is a surname. Notable people with the surname include:

- J. Dewey Daane (1918–2017), American economist
- Peter Daane (1835–1914), American businessman and politician

== See also ==
- Dane (name)
