= Fess (disambiguation) =

A fess is a heraldic charge.

Fess or FESS may also refer to:

== People ==
- Simeon D. Fess (1861–1936), American politician and educator, congressman and senator from Ohio
- Fess Parker (1924–2010), American actor
- Professor Longhair (1918–1980), blues singer and pianist also known as "Fess"
- Fess, nickname of Charlie Johnson (bandleader) (1891–1959), American jazz bandleader and pianist
- Fess Williams (1894–1975), American jazz musician

== Other uses ==
- Functional endoscopic sinus surgery, also brandname of a simple saline solution for sinus irrigation
- Fess Hotel, Madison, Wisconsin, on the National Register of Historic Places
- Fess Ferenc, a fictional character from Brian Lumley's Necroscope (series) novels
- FESS, an Open Source Enterprise Search Server based on Elasticsearch
- FESS, Flywheel Energy Storage System (cf Flywheel_energy_storage#Pulse_power)
