= Dane =

Dane or Danes may refer to:

== People ==
=== Pertaining to Denmark ===
- Dane, somebody from Denmark
- Danes, an ethnic group native to Denmark
- Danes (tribe), an ancient North Germanic tribe

=== Other people ===
- Dane (name), a surname and a given name (and a list of people with the name)
- Danes (surname), a surname
- The Danes, a term used in some Anglo-Saxon sources when referring to the Vikings

== Places ==
- Dane, Ontario, Canada
- Dane, Loška Dolina, Slovenia
- Dane County, Wisconsin, United States
  - Dane (town), Wisconsin, a town in Dane County
    - Dane, Wisconsin, a village in the town
- River Dane, a river mainly in Cheshire in northwest England
- Daneș, a commune in Mureș County, Romania
- Dane, Zagreb County, a village near Samobor
- Dane, Istria County, a village near Lanišće
- Dane Manor, a farmhouse in Orange County, New York

== DANE ==
- Departamento Administrativo Nacional de Estadística of Colombia
- DNS-based Authentication of Named Entities, a computer network security protocol

== See also ==
- Great Dane, a breed of dog
- East Danes, an Anglo-Saxon ethnonym used in the epic Beowulf
- Danes (disambiguation)
- Danish (disambiguation)
- Great Dane (disambiguation)
