= Espresso Book Machine =

Print-on-demand machine

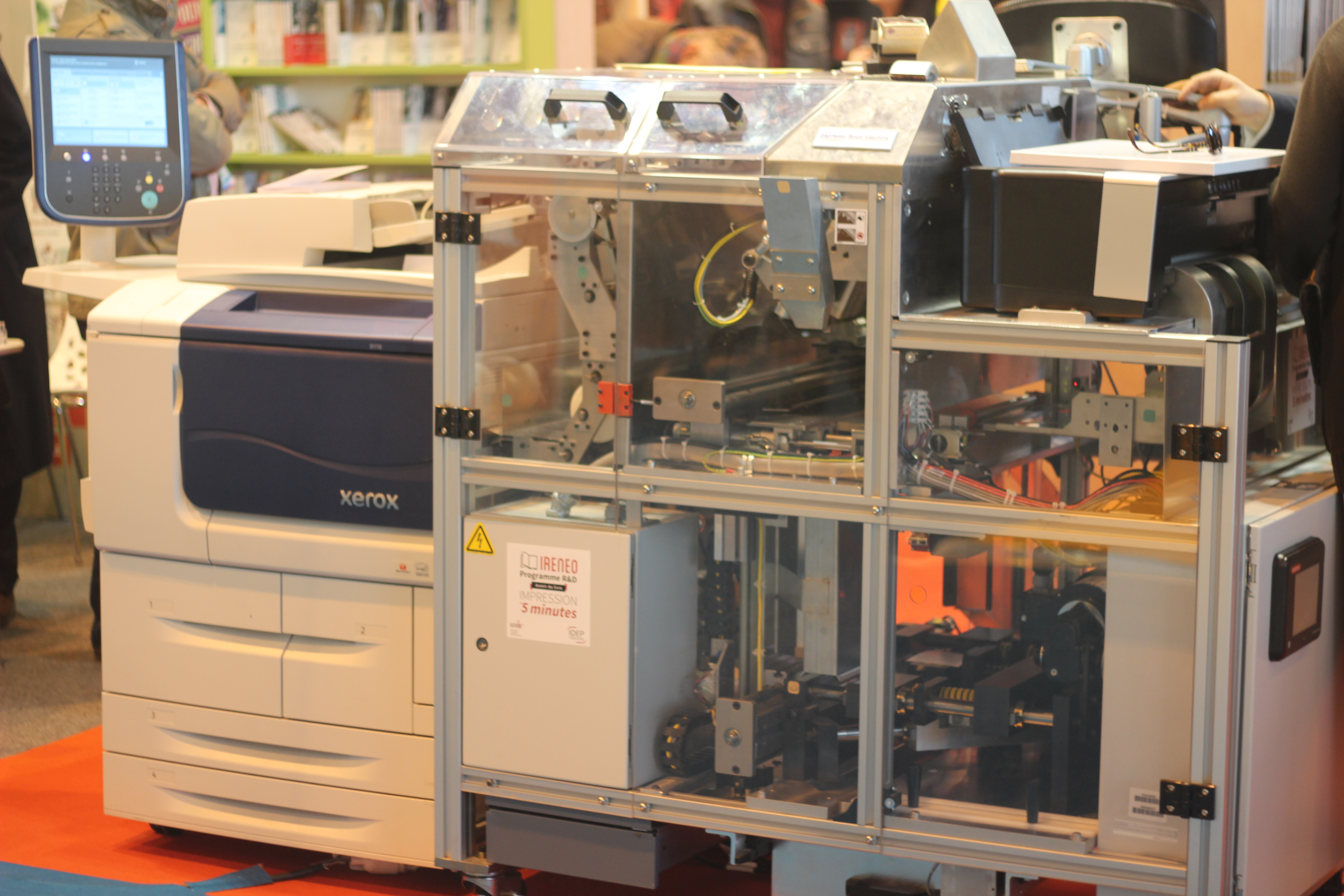
The Espresso Book Machine at the Salon du Livre de Paris in 2015.

The Espresso Book Machine (EBM) was a print on demand (POD) machine created by On Demand Books. It printed, collated, covered, and bound a single book in a few minutes. The machine was invented by Jeff Marsh, a St. Louis engineer, and was licensed and sold by On Demand Books (ODB), a company co-founded by publisher Jason Epstein and Dane Neller.

First installed in 2006 and publicly launched in 2007, the EBM was small enough to fit in a retail bookstore or small library room, and as such was targeted at retail and library markets. The machine took a PDF file for input and printed, bound, and trimmed the reader's selection as a paperback book. Time named it one of the best inventions of 2007.

Machines were installed in bookstores and libraries in the United States, Canada, the United Kingdom, Australia, Egypt and France, and ODB had 100 machines in the field at its peak. Wider adoption was held back by publishers' reluctance to make in-copyright titles available and by the machine's cost and floor space, and many owners came to use it mainly for self-publishing. On Demand Books went out of business in 2024, although some machines remained in use, including one at the Vancouver Island Regional Library in Nanaimo, British Columbia, which still offered public book printing in 2026.

== History ==
=== Origins ===
Jason Epstein gave a series of lectures in 1999 about his experiences in publishing. Epstein mentioned in his speech that a future was possible in which customers would be able to print an out-of-stock title on the spot, if a book-printing machine could be made that would fit in a store. At the time, Jeff Marsh, a St. Louis engineer and inventor, had already constructed a prototype book printer that could both photocopy and bind. Marsh was working on this project for Harvey Ross, who held U.S. Patent 5,465,213. Ross, also a St. Louis engineer, had conceived in 1989 of a system to store, print and bind books down to a single copy, and the patent was issued on November 7, 1995. Marsh, who had spent 24 years in the automotive industry, was introduced to Ross by St. Louis patent attorney Bill Cunningham. He regarded the gluing of the spine as the central problem and concentrated on the binding process; he later developed an ultrasonic glue-curing method, though production machines used conventional hot-melt adhesive. Marsh also patented his own binding and trimming apparatus, beginning with an application filed in April 1999; a later application in the same family, published in 2006, described a complete system that printed, bound and trimmed a single perfect-bound book on demand. Peter Zelchenko, a Chicago-based technologist and a partner of Ross in a related patent effort, worked with Marsh to prove the concept and also helped bring Marsh and other players together with several venture interests.

In July 2001 Marsh's prototype produced, in Chesterfield, Missouri, what the St. Louis Beacon described as the first book printed and bound completely without human intervention. Marsh went on to print several thousand titles, mostly self-publishing projects, on this precursor to the EBM, known as the Perfect Book Machine. Ross died in 2002.

Marsh met Epstein through a mutual friend, Michael Smolens. Ultimately Epstein, together with Dane Neller, former president and CEO of Dean and Deluca, and technology specialist Thor Sigvaldason, licensed Marsh's invention and founded On Demand Books in 2003. (Note: Publishers Weekly gave 2003 as the founding year in 2022, as did the Rochester Business Journal in 2010. A 2006 Publishers Weekly report described the company as founded the previous year.) Epstein became chairman and Neller chief executive. In 2006 the company received nearly US$766,000 from the Alfred P. Sloan Foundation.

=== Launch ===
The first experimental beta machine was installed in April 2006 at the World Bank InfoShop in Washington, D.C., which made 200 of its titles available for a three-month test. A second machine was installed at the Bibliotheca Alexandrina in Egypt to print books in Arabic. On Demand Books dated this installation to September 2006, while the library describes it as the second unit in the world and dates it to 2007. In 2007 the library and ODB signed a memorandum of understanding to form a joint venture supplying machines to member states of the Arab League.

Many booksellers and publishers first saw the EBM at BookExpo America in 2007. The first public demonstration of the production model, Version 1.5, took place on June 21, 2007, at the New York Public Library's Science, Industry and Business Library. Through August, the public was allowed to test the machine by printing free copies of public domain titles provided by the Open Content Alliance (OCA), a non-profit organization with a database of over 200,000 titles. At the unveiling, Neller said the company expected to license the machines rather than sell them. Time included the EBM in its list of the best inventions of 2007, describing a US$50,000 machine that could print a 300-page paperback with a color cover in three minutes.

=== Expansion ===
The University of Alberta Bookstore in Edmonton became the first bookstore to install an EBM, in November 2007, and recovered the cost in 11 months. In January 2008 Northshire Bookstore in Manchester Center, Vermont, became the first general bookstore to add a beta machine, nicknamed "Lurch", although Publishers Weekly reported in 2009 that it had made little difference to the store's bottom line. The University of Michigan Library installed a machine in 2008, the first university library in the United States to buy one. Angus & Robertson became the first book retailer to deploy an EBM, at one of its Melbourne stores in 2008; the machine was removed in 2009, and the company was reported to have dropped plans to roll out 50 machines across its stores. By March 2009 ODB listed 15 machines in operation, including ones at McMaster University and McGill University in Canada and at the New Orleans Public Library. In April 2009 Blackwell's unveiled the first EBM in a British bookshop at its Charing Cross Road store in London, at a cost of about £120,000, with access to almost half a million mostly out-of-copyright titles.

ODB released Version 2.0 in 2009. It was much smaller than earlier models and used more standard components. Publishers Weekly reported a price of US$75,000, or a lease of $1,250 a month, and a capacity of 60,000 books a year. Several more independent bookstores added machines in late 2009, among them Harvard Book Store in Cambridge, Massachusetts, Boxcar & Caboose Bookshop in St. Johnsbury, Vermont, Third Place Books in Lake Forest Park, Washington, Village Books in Bellingham, Washington, and Schuler Books & Music in Grand Rapids, Michigan. By November 2009 ODB had sold 21 machines.

In January 2010 Xerox and ODB agreed to jointly market and sell the EBM worldwide, paired with the Xerox 4112 copier/printer, with which the machine could print a 300-page book in under four minutes and more than 40,000 books a year. In December 2010 Xerox announced that its role would extend beyond supplying the print engine to sales and service support and a leasing option for the complete system, which would be available through Xerox from early 2011. Later Xerox configurations used the Xerox D95/D110 printer. ODB's location list showed 45 machines in 41 locations in August 2011, 12 of them in libraries, and Publishers Weekly counted just over 80 worldwide in 2013, the year Books-A-Million added two of the first machines able to print in color.

=== Decline and closure ===
In 2013 Publishers Weekly reported that four independent bookstores, Northshire, Village Books, Bookshop Santa Cruz and R.J. Julia Booksellers, had returned their machines in the preceding six months; three of them continued to offer self-publishing through local printers. Politics and Prose in Washington, D.C., which had installed its machine, nicknamed "Opus", in 2011 on a five-year lease, later gave it up because it broke down often and earned less than it cost to lease, but kept Opus as a self-publishing service using outside printing. Publishers Weekly reported in 2022 that some stores had given up their machines because major publishers were reluctant to make more titles available, and others because of the 75 square feet (7 m^{2}) the machine occupied.

In 2015 Neller and a group of investors bought the New York bookstore Shakespeare & Co. with the aim of building a national chain, using as a prototype a store with a small footprint, a café and an Espresso Book Machine. ODB became a sister company of the bookstores under the holding company Espresso Bookstore & Café Holdings. Epstein died in February 2022. Later that year Neller told Publishers Weekly that use of the machine had stalled and that fewer machines were active than at the peak, though ODB was still selling them; he named the difficulty of obtaining rights to fast-selling trade titles as the main obstacle to wider use.

On Demand Books shut down its EspressNet content network, citing supplier issues, and went out of business in 2024. After several closures, the Strand Bookstore agreed to take over the lease of the last remaining Shakespeare & Co. store, at Lincoln Square in Manhattan, from June 1, 2025.

== Design and operation ==
The Espresso Book Machine at the Vancouver Island Regional Library in Nanaimo, seen from the right, with the monitor of its control computer

The EBM combined a monochrome printer for the interior pages, a separate color printer for the cover, and an automated binding unit. Books were supplied as two PDF files, one for the cover and one for the text block. After printing, the binding unit gathered and aligned the pages, notched the spine and applied glue, pressed the text block into the cover, and trimmed the book to the size specified in the file's metadata. Each finished book carried a printed date and time stamp, and every copy was logged so that publishers could be paid.

Marsh's 2006 patent application describes the binding and trimming apparatus in more detail. A carriage moves the printed pages along a workpath, where they are jogged so that their edges align, the spine edge is milled to give the adhesive a good surface, and adhesive is applied. The cover, printed while the pages are being processed, is clamped around the book block at a binding station, and at the trimming station the book is turned through 90 degrees twice so that one blade can trim all three of its other edges. The application states that the apparatus adjusts itself to the size and thickness of each book, so that single copies of different books can be produced without manual setup, and gives a range of about 5 by 7 inches (13 cm × 18 cm) to 8.5 by 11 inches (22 cm × 28 cm) and roughly 25 to 1,000 pages.

A 2012 Xerox specification for the version built around the Xerox D95/D110 copier/printer listed books of 40 to 830 pages, 5 to 10.5 inches (127 to 267 mm) tall and 4.5 to 8.25 inches (114 to 210 mm) wide, with covers printed by an Epson inkjet printer on coated card stock. Once the text block and cover were printed, binding and output took four minutes or less, and the machine needed 60 minutes to reach operating condition after being switched on. The combined unit measured 80.79 inches (2.05 m) wide and 63.8 inches (1.62 m) tall.

Reported printing times for a 300-page book varied with the model and print engine, from three minutes quoted in 2007 to about four minutes in 2009 and under four minutes with the Xerox 4112. Wired reported in 2009 that the materials for such a book cost the store about US$3, and that the pages were printed on ordinary 20- or 24-pound paper with the cover on heavier stock. Rick Anderson of the University of Utah library wrote in 2011 that a 300-page book took about five minutes once the machine was warm, but that melting the glue from a cold start took 45 minutes to an hour. Interiors were normally printed in grayscale with full-color covers.

Control software on the Nanaimo machine's computer, running OS X 10.8.5, in 2026

The machine was run by EspressNet, ODB's proprietary software, which connected it to catalogs of content, delivered books as encrypted files that only the receiving machine could open, and tracked each job for payments to publishers. ODB also offered a self-publishing toolset called SelfEspress. ODB's early software was developed on Linux. In 2006 Thor Sigvaldason described a user interface built on Apache, PHP and MySQL, with a background program written in C++ that used Ghostscript to resize and convert book files; the beta machines also contained a separate embedded computer running Windows 2000 to drive the servo motors and hydraulics, which the company planned to replace. At the Bibliotheca Alexandrina, the library's International School of Information Science adapted the machine's software, which it described as built on an open-source platform, to handle Arabic-language books.

Published prices varied by model and configuration. Time reported US$50,000 in 2007. In 2009 Publishers Weekly gave $75,000 for Version 2.0 and Wired about $100,000, while IEEE Spectrum reported prices of up to $122,500, depending on the quality of the page printer. Publishers Weekly reported in 2013 that the machine had at one time cost as much as $185,000 and then sold for about $85,000.

== Distribution ==
The direct-to-consumer model promoted by On Demand Books was intended to eliminate the need for shipping, warehousing, returns, and pulping of unsold books, and to allow simultaneous global availability of millions of new and backlist titles.

Following patent lawsuits and appeals between On Demand Book Machine Inc. and Ingram, the two companies agreed to work together, and Ingram's on-demand division, Lightning Source, became a content partner of On Demand Books, offering about 200,000 in-print titles by 2009. In September 2009 Google agreed to give ODB access to more than two million public-domain books digitized through Google Books, in addition to the 1.6 million titles already available on the machine; Google Books titles carried a recommended retail price of $8. Google and ODB each took $1 a copy, leaving the retailer about $3 of profit, and Google planned to donate its share to charity. Neller said that with the agreement "content retrieval is now centralized and production is decentralized". ODB cited 3.3 million available titles in 2010.

Publishers were slower to provide in-copyright books. Shambhala Publications was among the first to sign on, in October 2010, followed by the University of Pittsburgh Press. In September 2011 HarperCollins became the first major trade publisher to offer a comprehensive backlist for in-store printing on the machine, about 5,000 trade paperback titles sold on an agency model. Penguin, Kensington, Perseus and Akashic later joined. Neller acknowledged in 2013 that publishers had been reluctant to provide anything beyond deep backlist titles, and said ODB had responded by helping booksellers build self-publishing programs. Anderson wrote in 2011 that much of the catalog consisted of old public-domain titles and that its metadata, much of it from Google Books, was of poor quality.

== Notable installations ==
Harvard Book Store named its machine "Paige M. Gutenborg"; the first book it printed was the Bay Psalm Book. By 2011 the store printed about 1,500 books a month on it, around three-quarters of them self-published. In 2022 Boxcar & Caboose said its machine, used mainly to print books by local authors, provided 6 to 8 percent of the store's revenue, and Schuler Books printed 3,000 to 5,000 books a year on its machine, including 1,500 to 2,000 public-domain titles from Google Books.

Several university libraries installed machines, including Brigham Young University and the University of Utah, where Anderson reported strong demand for self-publishing services and for blank journals printed with covers drawn from the library's digital collections. In 2012 the Windsor Public Library in Windsor, Ontario, became the first public library in Canada to install an EBM. By 2015 it had printed 10,699 books in English, Arabic, Polish, Spanish and French, and 98 percent of its customers were self-publishing. Public libraries also placed machines in makerspaces; the Cincinnati & Hamilton County Public Library operated one in the MakerSpace at its downtown main library.

The Presses Universitaires de France (PUF) showed an EBM at the 2015 Salon du livre de Paris, where it drew visitors and journalists as well as the prime minister and president during their visits. On March 10, 2016, PUF opened a 80-square-meter (860 sq ft) bookstore at 60 rue Monsieur-le-Prince in Paris's Latin Quarter, 17 years after closing its historic shop on the Place de la Sorbonne. Customers could have titles from a catalog of about 5,000 PUF books printed on the store's EBM, which produced a monochrome book in six to seven minutes; the machine belonged to Idep, a printing industry research office, and the premises were among those managed by the city of Paris to preserve cultural businesses in the 6th arrondissement.

== Later use ==
The Espresso Book Machine at the Nanaimo Harbourfront branch of the Vancouver Island Regional Library in 2026, photographed with a fisheye lens

A poetry anthology printed on an Espresso Book Machine

Some machines remained in use after On Demand Books closed. The Vancouver Island Regional Library installed its first self-publishing EBM in the Creativity Commons, a technology and innovation space at its renovated Nanaimo Harbourfront branch, which reopened on November 7, 2015. The machine was the basis of a library publishing imprint, Second Storey Press. Staff helped local authors format and print their books, and the machine printed memoirs, poetry, school projects, fan fiction, comic books and out-of-copyright works. The library also used it to print its own anthologies, including 150 x 39 (2017), with a poem for each of the system's 39 branches to mark Canada's 150th anniversary, and Alone but Not Alone: Poetry in Isolation (2020), written during the COVID-19 pandemic. In 2026 the library still listed printing on the machine among the branch's current services. Customers emailed cover and text PDF files, staff printed a test copy for approval, and the library charged a cover and binding fee per book plus a per-page paper fee.

As of October 2026, the Cincinnati & Hamilton County Public Library's website stated that its machine was being replaced and that the MakerSpace was not accepting book orders in the meantime.

== Reception ==
Blackwell's chief executive Andrew Hutchings said at the machine's London launch in 2009 that it "could change bookselling fundamentally". Early owners also reported mechanical problems. Anderson described leaking inkjets, faulty sensors and unreliable cover feeds at the University of Utah, and noted that Brigham Young University's machine had needed an ionizing fan because static from the dry climate kept pages from stacking cleanly.

Owners found that the machine was used mainly for self-publishing rather than for printing out-of-print or backlist titles. In 2012 Schuler Books reported that 95 percent or more of the books printed on its machine were self-published, and Windsor Public Library reported in 2015 that 98 percent of its customers were self-publishing.

The economics were uncertain. Publishers Weekly reported in 2009 that the University of Alberta Bookstore had recovered its cost within a year while the machine had made little difference to Northshire's bottom line, and Windsor Public Library said in 2015 that its service was not yet making money. In 2022 a Schuler Books operator said it was cheaper for the store to order many in-stock titles from Ingram than to print them on the machine. Neller attributed the limited uptake mainly to publishers, some of whom were concerned that each book printed on the machine would be one fewer sold from the shelf.
