= Vancouver Island Regional Library =

Public library system in British Columbia

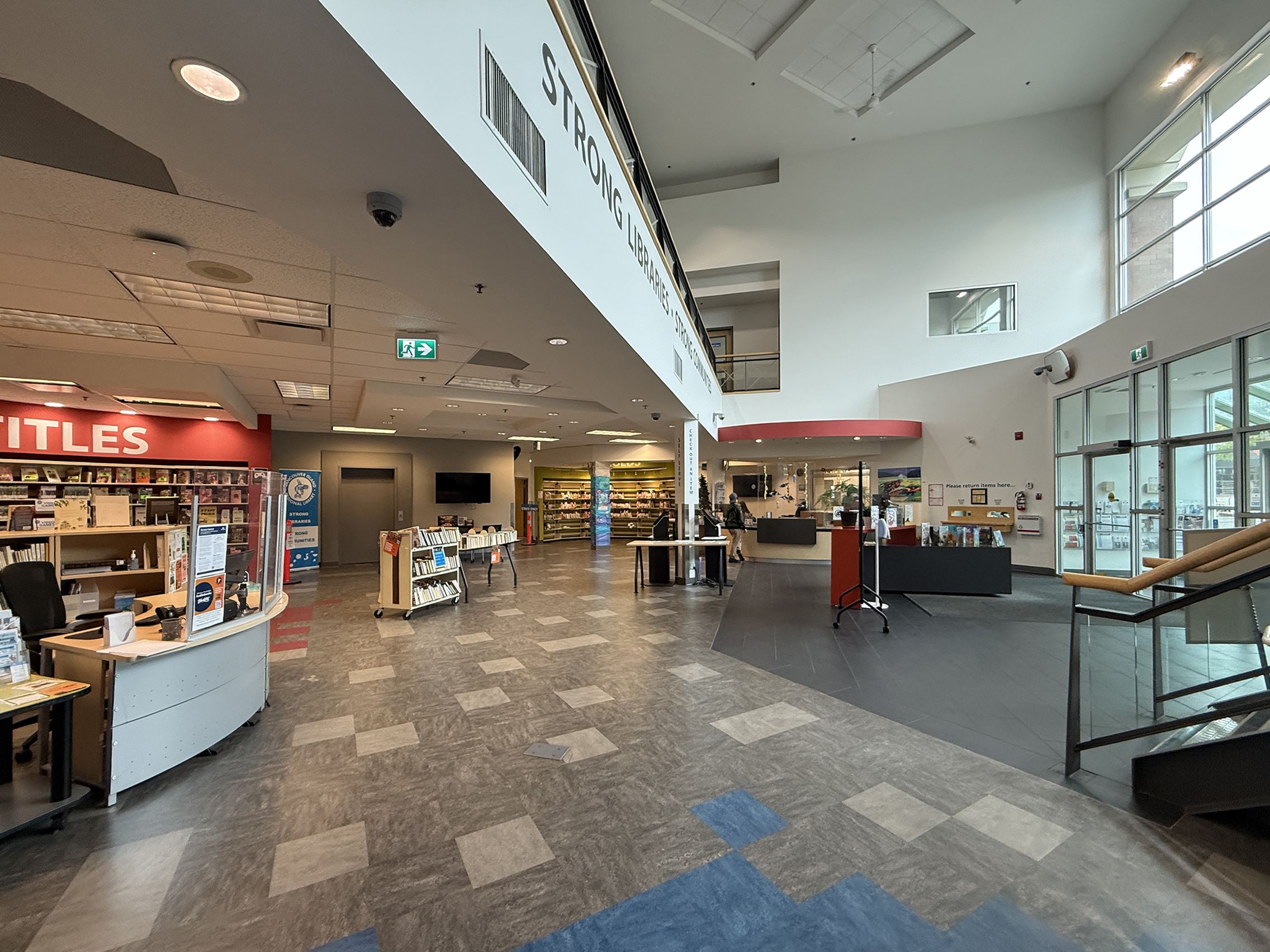
- Interior of the Nanaimo Harbourfront branch
- Location: Nanaimo, British Columbia, Canada
- Type: Regional public library system
- Scope: Vancouver Island, Haida Gwaii and the Central Coast
- Established: 1936 (as Vancouver Island Union Library)
- Reference to legal mandate: Library Act, RSBC 1996, c. 264
- Branches: 39

Collection
- Items collected: Books, e-books, audiobooks, periodicals, DVDs, CDs, seeds and lending kits
- Size: Over 1 million items (2024)

Access and use
- Circulation: Approximately 5 million (2024)
- Population served: Nearly 500,000 (2026)
- Members: 148,144 cardholders (2024)

Other information
- Budget: C$33.4 million (2026 operating budget)
- Director: Eileen Gillette
- Website: virl.bc.ca

The Vancouver Island Regional Library (VIRL) is a regional public library system in British Columbia, Canada, serving communities on Vancouver Island, Haida Gwaii and the Central Coast. Established in 1936 as the Vancouver Island Union Library, it was among the earliest regional library districts formed in the province following the development of the Fraser Valley library demonstration. The system operates as a regional library district under Part 3 of British Columbia's Library Act, with a board of 38 trustees representing 28 municipalities and 10 regional districts. As of 2026, VIRL operated 39 branches and a Books by Mail service across a geographic area exceeding 42,000 square kilometres, serving nearly 500,000 residents. Its administrative headquarters are located in Nanaimo, adjoining the Nanaimo North branch.

== History ==
=== Founding ===
The origins of Vancouver Island Regional Library can be traced to the expansion of regional library services in British Columbia during the early twentieth century. The province's Public Library Commission, established under legislation passed in 1919, supported the development of cooperative library systems, including the Carnegie-funded Fraser Valley Public Library Demonstration launched in 1930. The Carnegie Corporation of New York provided $100,000 for the Fraser Valley demonstration, which began in March 1930; after a majority of participating communities voted to continue funding it, the Fraser Valley Union Library District was established in June 1934. Following two local plebiscites, the Vancouver Island Union Library was established in 1936 with financial assistance from the Carnegie Corporation of New York. In its first year, the system operated six branches and seven van routes with approximately 12,600 books; it also maintained 28 smaller sub-branches, according to VIRL's historical account. VIRL also records approximately 6,100 members and an annual budget of $8,213 in its first year. A 1935 vote to join the proposed union library was defeated in Shawnigan Lake, whose ratepayers subsequently voted to join about a decade later.

=== Expansion ===
Mobile library services were an important means of reaching smaller communities, although fuel and tire shortages during the Second World War restricted the frequency of visits. The network expanded in subsequent decades as communities joined the library district, including Ladysmith in 1937 and Duncan in 1947. In June 1961, the Nanaimo branch moved into a purpose-built library on Fitzwilliam Street, a building subsequently recognized on the Canadian Register of Historic Places. VIRL introduced its Books by Mail service in 1985 and retired its bookmobiles in 1987.

== Governance ==
Vancouver Island Regional Library is governed as a regional library district under Part 3 of British Columbia's Library Act. Under section 16, each participating municipal council or regional district board appoints one of its members as a library trustee, along with an alternate. As of 2026, its board comprised 38 trustees representing 28 municipalities and 10 regional districts. The board determines policies and budgets and appoints the library's chief librarian or executive director. At its February 2026 annual general meeting, Jonathan Lerner of Lantzville became board chair and Cheryl Northcott of Tahsis became vice-chair, succeeding the previous chair, Erin Hemmens of Nanaimo. Eileen Gillette has served as executive director since 1 November 2025, having previously held the position on an interim basis.

VIRL is funded principally by levies from its participating local governments. Section 24 of the Library Act apportions costs equally between the population of each member's service area and the converted value of land and improvements in that area, unless two-thirds of the member jurisdictions approve an alternative formula. According to its audited 2025 statements, municipal and regional-district levies provided C$34.46 million, approximately 93% of total revenue of C$36.97 million. A 2017 resolution submitted to the Union of British Columbia Municipalities by Ladysmith reported that the provincial share of VIRL's revenue had fallen from 21% in 1986 to 5% in 2016; VIRL reported a provincial share of 4% in 2024. In February 2026, elected officials raised concerns about the formula's effects on some rural property owners, while VIRL said it was seeking a provincial review of library funding.

== Services ==
Vancouver Island Regional Library offers a books-by-mail service. VIRL has a searchable online catalogue.

- Information and reference services
- Access to full-text databases
- Community information
- Internet access
- Reader's advisory services
- Programs for children, youth and adults
- Interlibrary loan
- Downloadable e-books and audiobooks
- Digital media and streaming resources

== Branches ==
With administrative offices in the same building as the Nanaimo North branch, VIRL operates 39 branches in communities across its service area. Its branches are located in Bella Coola, Bowser, Campbell River, Chemainus, Comox, Cortes Island, Courtenay, Cowichan (Duncan), Cowichan Lake (Lake Cowichan), Cumberland, Daajing Giids, Gabriola Island, Gold River, Hornby Island, Ladysmith, Masset, Nanaimo Harbourfront, Nanaimo North, Nanaimo Wellington, Parksville, Port Alberni, Port Alice, Port Clements, Port Hardy, Port McNeill, Port Renfrew, Quadra Island, Qualicum Beach, Sandspit, Sayward, Sidney / North Saanich (Sidney), Sointula, Sooke, South Cowichan (Mill Bay), Tahsis, Tofino, Ucluelet, Union Bay and Woss.

=== Early branches ===
In 1936, the Vancouver Island Union Library operated six branches and 28 smaller sub-branches, connected by seven van routes. The Nanaimo branch opened that year, while Port Alberni established its library following a local plebiscite in 1936; by 1938, the latter operated from the rear of McVicar's Drug Store, where employees served as library attendants. In the Lake Cowichan area, informal library services were offered in private homes, the community hall and other premises from 1936; a purpose-built Cowichan Lake branch opened in 2013.

Other communities joined the developing network over the following years. Ladysmith, which had opened its own public library in 1935 with 800 volumes, joined the union system in 1937. Comox joined as a book station in the same year, withdrew in 1957 and returned as a branch in 1972. Following a 1947 plebiscite, Duncan joined the system and its branch briefly operated in the Agricultural Hall before moving to other locations; the present Cowichan branch has occupied the Cowichan Community Centre since 2004. Chemainus and Union Bay established branches in 1949, the former initially in the local Masonic Hall.

=== Major branches ===
The Espresso Book Machine at the Nanaimo Harbourfront branch of the Vancouver Island Regional Library in 2026, photographed with a fisheye lens

The Nanaimo Harbourfront branch is among the library system's largest facilities. Its approximately 25,000-square-foot building, on Diana Krall Plaza in downtown Nanaimo, has housed the branch since 1997. A 2015 refurbishment of the second floor established Creativity Commons, a space for technology, media production and other creative activities. The Commons initially housed Second Storey Press, a library publishing imprint using an Espresso Book Machine for on-demand paperback printing, and it continues to offer book printing, 3D printing, audiovisual digitization and recording facilities. The Commons is located within Harbourfront rather than being counted as a separate branch.

The Nanaimo North branch opened on 12 July 2014 in a building attached to VIRL's central administration and services offices at 6250 Hammond Bay Road. The library occupies approximately 17,600 square feet and holds more than 60,000 items; the 2023 facilities plan records approximately 29,000 square feet for the combined library and administration building. Other substantial branches include Sooke, housed since 2022 in a purpose-built circular building of approximately 13,412 square feet; Cowichan in Duncan, occupying approximately 12,800 square feet; and Courtenay, with approximately 12,521 square feet. These floor areas are drawn from the 2023 facilities plan.
