= Harvard Book Store =

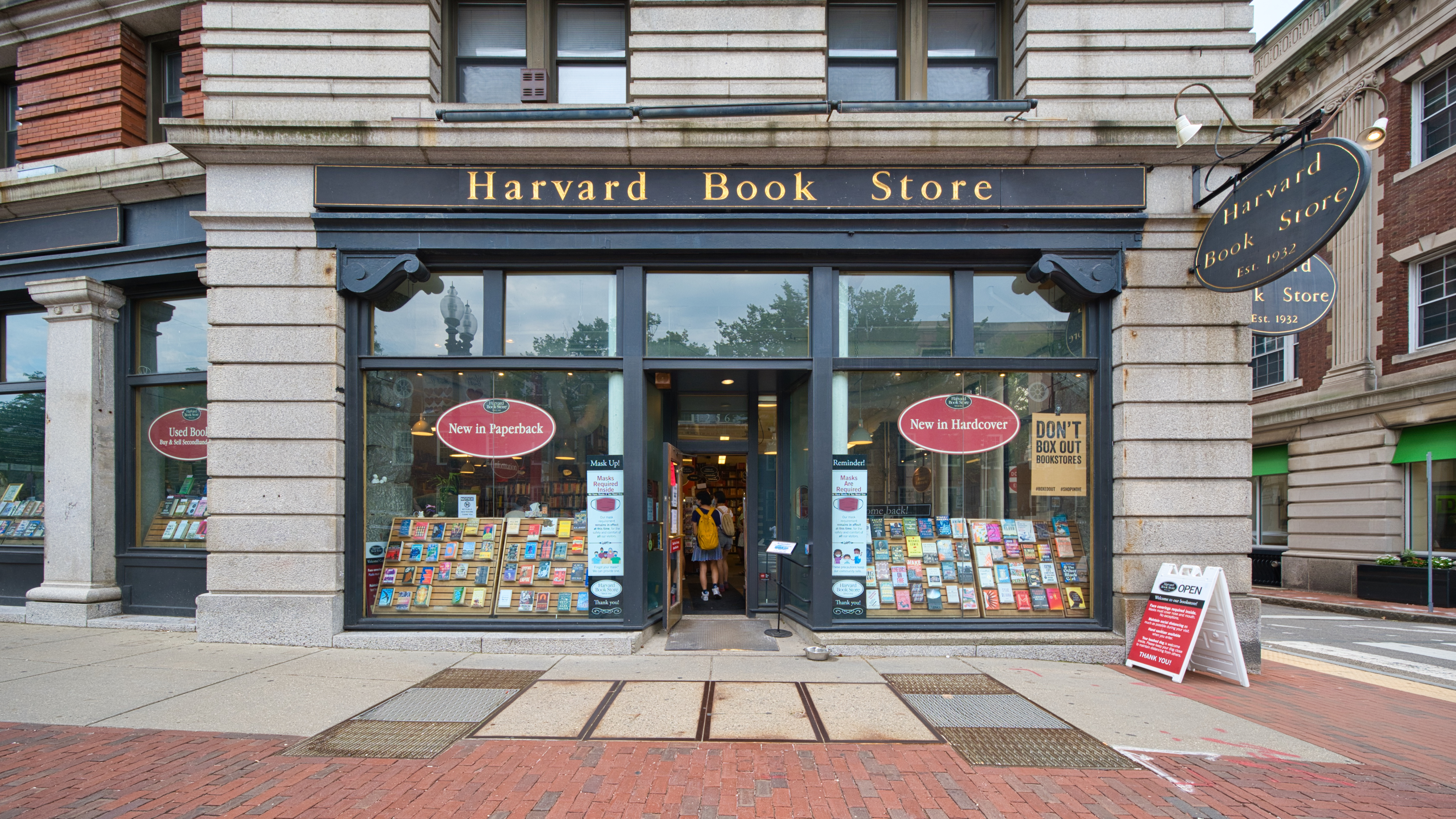
- Location: Cambridge, Massachusetts
- Coordinates: 42.3725°N 71.1164°W
- Opened: 1932 (94 years ago)
- Owner: Jeffrey Mayersohn and Linda Seamonson
- Website: Harvard Book Store website

Harvard Book Store is an independent and locally owned seller of used, new, and bargain books in Cambridge's Harvard Square.

Harvard Book Store was established in 1932 by Mark Kramer, father of longtime owner Frank Kramer, and originally sold used textbooks to students.

Family-owned for over seventy-five years, the store was sold in the fall of 2008 to Jeffrey Mayersohn and Linda Seamonson of Wellesley, Massachusetts, and remains an independent business.

The store has no affiliation with Harvard University or the Harvard Coop bookstore, which is managed by Barnes & Noble. With a focus on an academic and intellectual audience, the store's selection and customer service is repeatedly honored by local publications and surveys.

Forbes named the book store as its top bookshop in its "World's Top Shops 2005" list.

In 2009, the store introduced an on-demand book printing service called the Espresso Book Machine, produced by New York firm On Demand Books, using books in the public domain available through Google Library. In 2022, the Espresso Book Machine was retired and its service was discontinued.

In recent years, a well-attended author event series has hosted Al Gore, Salman Rushdie, Haruki Murakami, John Updike, Orhan Pamuk, and Stephen King, in addition to a number of local writers and academics.
