= Dane Sharp =

Dane Sharp may refer to:

- Dane Sharp (singer-songwriter), Australian singer-songwriter
- Dane Sharp (squash player) (born 1985), Canadian squash player
