= Danish =

Danish may refer to:

- Something of, from, or related to the country of Denmark

== People ==
- A Danish person, also called a "Dansker", can be a national or citizen of Denmark (see Demographics of Denmark)
- Culture of Denmark
- Danish people or Danskere, people with a Danish ancestral or ethnic identity
- A member of the Danes, a Germanic tribe
- Danish (name), a male given name and surname

== Language ==
- Danish language, a language used mostly in Denmark.
- Danish tongue or Old Norse, the parent language of all North Germanic languages

== Food ==
- Danish cuisine
- Danish pastry, often simply called a "Danish"

== See also ==
- Dane (disambiguation)
- Gdańsk
- List of Danes
- Languages of Denmark
- Dansk Designs, American home goods manufacturer, colloquially known as "Dansk"
