= The Great Dane =

The Great Dane is a nickname which may refer to:

== Persons ==
- Daniel Agger (born 1984), retired Danish football defender
- Morten Andersen (born 1960), Danish-American National Football League kicker
- Victor Borge (1909–2000), Danish comedian, entertainer and pianist
- Gus Hansen (born 1974), Danish professional poker player
- Tom Kristensen (racing driver) (born 1967), Danish sportscar racing driver
- Lauritz Melchior (1890–1973), Danish-American operatic tenor
- Nils Middelboe (1887–1976), Danish football attacker
- Jan Mølby (born 1963), retired Danish football midfielder
- Brigitte Nielsen (born 1963), Danish actress
- Peter Schmeichel (born 1963), retired Danish football goalkeeper

== Characters ==
- The Great Dane, a fictional character portrayed by Adam Pally from the U.S. TV show FUBAR (TV series)

== See also ==
- Dane (disambiguation)
