= Váňa =

Váňa is a Czech surname. Notable people with the surname include:

- Bohumil Váňa (1920–1989), Czech table tennis player
- Jaroslav Váňa, Czech slalom canoeist
- Jiří Váňa (1940–2018), Czech botanist
- Josef Váňa (born 1952), Czech jockey
- Michal Váňa (born 1963), Czech footballer
