= Dane McDonald =

Australian rugby league player (born 1987)

Personal information
- Born: 14 July 1987 (age 38) Australia

Playing information
- Position: Loose forward, Halfback
Club
Years	Team	Pld	T	G	FG	P
2009–2012	Sheffield Eagles	83	26	0	0	104
- As of 24 May 2013

Dane McDonald (born 14 July 1987) is an Australian rugby league player, who last played for Sheffield Eagles in the European Co-operative Championship. His positions are loose forward, stand off and halfback. He previously played for Burleigh Bears and Wests Tigers.

McDonald missed much of the 2009 season with a broken thumb.
