= Dane Dukić =

Serbian footballer (born 1981)

Personal information
- Date of birth: 24 August 1981 (age 45)
- Place of birth: Novi Sad, SFR Yugoslavia
- Height: 1.88 m (6 ft 2 in)
- Position: Midfielder

Senior career*
Years	Team	Apps	(Gls)
2000–2001	Bačka Palanka		
2001–2003	ČSK Čelarevo	8	(0)
2004–2008	Bačka Palanka	100	(20)
2008–2009	Radnički Šid	23	(1)
2009–2011	Bačka Palanka	10	(0)
2010	→ Radnički Šid (loan)	14	(2)
2012	Radnički Šid	13	(0)
2012–2016	Bačka Palanka	39	(0)
2017	Krila Krajine	0	(0)
- * Club domestic league appearances and goals as of 17 March 2017

Dane Dukić (Serbian Cyrillic: Дане Дукић; born 24 August 1981) is a Serbian retired footballer who played as a midfielder.

== Club career ==
Born in Novi Sad, Dukić spent his career playing with 3 clubs including OFK Bačka, ČSK Čelarevo and Radnički Šid. He started his career with OFK Bačka in the 2000–01 Serbian League Vojvodina season, making a debut against OFK Kikinda in August 2000, when he also scored a goal. Next year, Dukić moved to ČSK Čelarevo, where he stayed until the end of 2003. Returning in his home club, OFK Bačka, Dukić scored 20 goals in 100 Serbian League Vojvodina matches between 2004 and 2008. Dukić also played with Radnički Šid in next several seasons, returning in OFK Bačka in the meantime. As a regular player of OFK Bačka since 2012–13 season, Dukić progressed 3 league ranks for 4 seasons. After the 2015–16 season, Dukić made a promotion to the Serbian SuperLiga along with the club. On 28 January 2017, Dukić announced his retirement from professional football, but later joined lower league club Krila Krajine.

== Honours ==
OFK Bačka

- Vojvodina League West: 2012–13
- Serbian League Vojvodina: 2013–14
