= Abbas Saad =

Football player and coach (born 1967)

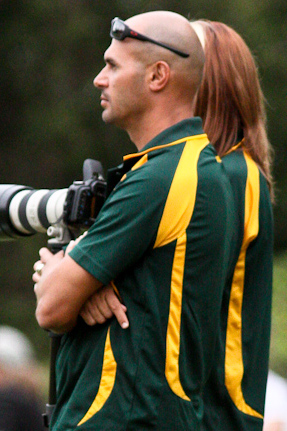
- Saad in 2009

Personal information
- Date of birth: 1 December 1967 (age 58)
- Place of birth: Baalbek, Lebanon
- Height: 1.78 m (5 ft 10 in)
- Position: Attacking midfielder

Senior career*
Years	Team	Apps	(Gls)
1985	Sydney City	14	(2)
1986–1990	Sydney Olympic	110	(38)
1990	Singapore FA	22	(11)
1991–1992	Johor	40	(16)
1993	Sydney Olympic	12	(1)
1993–1994	Singapore FA	26	(12)
1996–1997	Sydney Olympic	12	(1)
1997–1999	Sydney United	27	(9)
1999–2000	Northern Spirit	13	(3)
2000	Canterbury-Marrickville	11	(6)
2001	Fraser Park	10	(2)
2002	Auburn United	10	(5)
2002–2003	St George Saints	11	(4)
2003	Belmore Hercules	9	(4)
Total		358	(126)

International career
1992–1998	Australia	4	(0)

Managerial career
- 2008: Penrith Nepean United
- 2018–2021: Sydney Olympic
- 2022: Bonnyrigg White Eagles
- 2023: Central Coast Mariners Academy
- 2023: Central Coast Mariners (interim)
- 2024–2025: Rydalmere Lions
- 2027–: Rockdale Ilinden
- * Club domestic league appearances and goals

Abbas Saad (Arabic: عباس سعد; born 1 December 1967) is a soccer manager and former player, who will manage National Premier Leagues NSW Men's club Rockdale Ilinden beginning in 2027. Born in Lebanon, he played for the Australia national team.

== Club career ==
Saad began his playing career in 1985 at Sydney City, before moving to Sydney Olympic. In 1990, he was awarded the Joe Marston Medal for the being the Player of the Match in the 1990 National Soccer League Grand Final, in which Sydney Olympic beat the Marconi Stallions 2–0.

He then played in the Malaysian League for Johor and Singapore in the early 1990s. He was a key member of teams which won the League and Malaysia Cup double with both Johor in 1991 and Singapore in 1994.

In the 1994 Malaysia Cup final, Saad scored a hat-trick in Singapore's 4–0 victory over Pahang. Initially offered a one-year contract, Saad was offered two years on his contract after the Malaysia Cup win.

=== Conviction for match-fixing in Singapore ===
In 1995, Saad was charged with match-fixing in Singapore. He has always maintained he was innocent of this charge. During his trial, he admitted that he had been approached by his teammate Michal Váňa (a Czech player who was also charged with match-fixing but who jumped bail and left Singapore before he could be tried), who asked Saad to help him win certain matches by large margins during the 1994 season as Váňa was betting on the outcome of the games. However Saad stated that he had refused to help Váňa try to fix the scores of any games, and had merely told Váňa that he would try to help the Singapore team win the games by as many goals as possible as this was his job. Saad had not reported Váňa's requests or his knowledge that Váňa was betting on games to team officials or the authorities, but stated during his trial that he had told Váňa that he should stop betting on matches.

In June 1995, the Singapore courts convicted Saad of match-fixing and fined him S$50,000. Saad received a lifetime ban from the Football Association of Singapore (FAS) from football activities in Singapore. FIFA then issued a worldwide ban for Saad for life which was lifted after one year. Saad appealed to the FAS to lift the ban immediately after the ban but was rejected.

Saad continues to maintain that he was innocent of match-fixing, and that he merely knew that Váňa was betting on the outcomes of matches but was not involved himself. Speaking about the verdict in an interview in 2009, Saad said: "(Váňa) approached me once and said 'you score goals?' and I said 'of course I score goals, I'm a striker'. And so that conversation was taken out of context. There was no money received or nothing like that. I don't know how they built a case, I think it was a technical thing. I'm not a lawyer."

In 2009, FAS lifted Saad's ban in Singapore.

=== Resumption of career ===
After his FIFA ban ended, Saad played for several teams in the National Soccer League in Australia – Sydney Olympic in 1996–97, Sydney United from 1997 to 1999, and for Northern Spirit FC in the 1999–00 season.

In 2003, Saad retired from playing.

== International career ==
An attacking midfielder with a good eye for goal, Saad represented the Australian national team in a match against Russian club Torpedo Moscow and earned his first full cap against Malaysia two years later. After a six-year gap, he was recalled by then Socceroos coach Terry Venables for three games in 1998. In all, he played six times for Australia, earning four full caps.

== Managerial career ==
Saad was coach at New South Wales Premier League side Penrith Nepean United, and in 2009 was named as Technical Youth Director by Sydney Olympic FC. He has also been the head coach for the Australian Deaf Football team. Saad has also served as the head coach of the GIS Academy at the Garden International School in Kuala Lumpur, Malaysia.

In 2018, Saad returned to Sydney Olympic and led the team to win the New South Wales Premier League and Finals series championships double. He was named Coach of the Year.

In 2021, Saad started on his Asian Football Confederation Pro Licence course and returned to Singapore with an attachment to Singapore Premier League (SPL) Geylang International FC as an assistant coach. During the stint with Geylang, Geylang won two out three matches and improved its position from sixth to fifth in the SPL. Geylang offered Saad to lead its youth development programme until the end of the SPL season with an option to extend for the next season. Saad accepted the offer but his application for a S Pass to work in Singapore was rejected by the Ministry of Manpower, citing his "adverse record". An appeal was made and was rejected similarly.

== Broadcasting career ==
In August 2009, Saad appeared as a football expert in the studios of ESPN STAR Sports and for the SingTel coverage of the UEFA Champions League in Singapore, where his popularity once saw him dubbed as "The Singapore Beckham". He is also a regular studio guest for the English Premier League coverage and the FourFourTwo TV Show with the SuperSport channel on Malaysian network, Astro.

== Personal life ==
Saad was born in Lebanon as the fourth child out of seven children to his parents. When the Lebanese Civil War broke out in 1975, Saad's eldest brother, Hussein died in an explosion. Saad's family then left for Sydney, Australia where his eldest sister Namat had moved to after she was married.

Abbas married Rania, an Australian of Arab descent, in 2000. They have two sons and a daughter. He named his sons after boxer Muhammad Ali, and his football teammate Malek Awab
