= Declan Hill =

Canadian journalist and academic

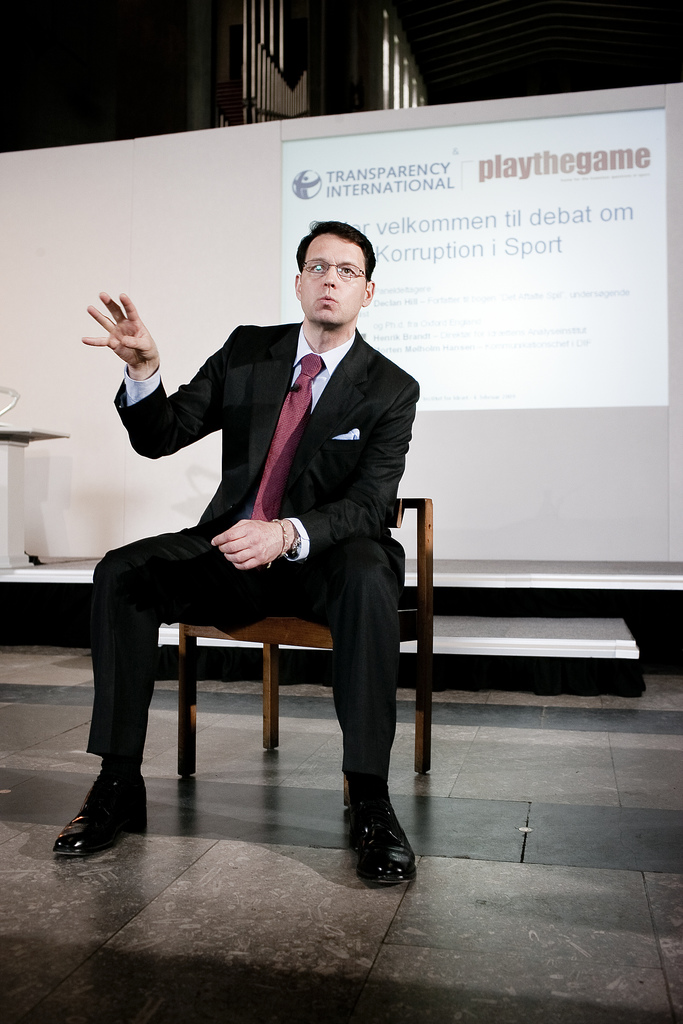
- Declan Hill speaking at Play The Game in 2009
- Occupations: Investigative journalist, Consultant, Academic
- Website: www.declanhill.com

Declan Hill is a journalist, academic and consultant. He is one of the world’s foremost experts on match-fixing and corruption in international sports. In 2008, Hill, as a Chevening Scholar, obtained his doctorate in Sociology at the University of Oxford. Currently, he is a senior research fellow in anti-corruption in sports at the University of Würzburg and a professor at the University of New Haven where he has opened the Centre for Sports Integrity in the Investigations Program.

His book ‘The Fix: Organized Crime and Soccer’ has appeared in twenty-one languages. Hill was the first person to show the new danger to international sport posed by the globalization of the gambling market and match-fixing at the highest levels of professional football (soccer) including the Champions League and FIFA World Cup tournaments. Part of the book details his involvement with an Asian match-fixing gang as they travelled around the world to fix major football matches. Hill has also published a number of academic articles, is a reviewer for Global Integrity and has probed the impact of the Russian mafia on professional ice hockey. In 2011, he pioneered the first on-line anti-match-fixing education course for Sport Accord that was eventually used by Interpol. In 2013, his second book 'The Insider's Guide to Match-Fixing' was published and immediately translated to Japanese. It is a popular version of his doctoral thesis and was dubbed by its English-language publisher as 'Freakonomics meets Sports Corruption'

== Personal life ==
Hill is a graduate of the National Theatre School of Canada, Trinity College, Toronto and University of Oxford.

In his spare time, Hill is a keen amateur boxer and he leads groups of recreational and competitive fighters to train in Havana, Cuba. On March 31, 2012, Hill won a charity boxing match that was part of the historic Trudeau-Brazeau night – as part of Fight for the Cure in support the Ottawa Regional Cancer Foundation. In 2017, he and Trudeau fought a non-judged sparring match followed by Hill conducting an interview of Trudeau for the Toronto Star from the center of the boxing ring.

== Career ==
Hill acted in minor roles at the Shaw Festival and other Canadian theatres, then in India on the Doordshan television series ‘Bhaarat ek Khoj’. Because of his experiences in a Calcutta street clinic he gradually drifted away from theatre, becoming one of the founding volunteers of the Canadian chapter of Doctors without Borders (MSF) and then moved into journalism. Hill worked for the Canadian Broadcasting Corporation (CBC) first as an investigative journalist at the flagship program The Fifth Estate then as an anchor for Newsworld International. His programs and articles have also appeared in The New York Times, the Toronto Star, and the BBC Radio World Service, The Guardian and the Sunday Telegraph (London), as well as various news media outlets including CNN, Le Monde, Der Spiegel, The Sydney Morning Herald, Al Jazeera, The Times, Il Manifesto, Corriere della Sera (Milan): El País (Madrid) Politiken (Copenhagen)

Before publishing The Fix, Hill completed documentaries on the widespread murders of Filipino journalists, the killing of the head of the Canadian mafia, blood feuds in Kosovo, ethnic cleansing in Iraq, pagan religions in Bolivia and honour killings in Turkey.

He has also given presentations about sports corruption to a number of organizations including the International Olympic Committee (IOC), committees at the European Parliament in Brussels and the UK Parliament in Westminster, the Council of Europe, the Dutch Football Association (KNVB) and the Australian and New Zealand Sports Lawyers Association. Hill is also the winner of the 2007 Canadian Association of Journalists Award for best investigative radio documentary and is an Amnesty International Canada 2003 Media Award Winner. The Play The Game Award winner for an individual who best exemplifies the qualities of sport and an honorary award from the Greek Sports Journalist Association for his role in revealing sports corruption.

== Public dispute ==
In September 2013, following the arrest of match-fixers in Singapore, Hill was interviewed on BBC Radio World Service where he claimed the Singapore Police Force to have offered protection to the accused from prosecution. This was strongly disputed by the Singapore government as baseless and challenged him to come forth with any evidence to substantiate his claims. In response to Hill's claims, Ronald Noble, Secretary General of Interpol said that "Those who do not recognise the commitment and resources that Singapore has devoted to identifying those believed to be responsible for match-fixing cases, or those who seek publicity -- simply to criticise every positive development that occurs in fighting match-fixing should simply open their eyes and look at the facts." Hill responded to these accusations by saying that if they had not been providing tacit protection for the nest of home-grown fixers in their midst, then the Singaporean police must be one of the most inept law-enforcement agencies in the world. For over two years, they had ignored two international arrest warrants - strangely both were from Ron Noble's Interpol (who subsequently opened a regional headquarters in Singapore) and the well-publicized criminal trial of a Singaporean match-fixer in Finland.

== U.S. Helsinki Commission testimony ==
In December 2018, Hill testified at the bi-partisan U.S. Helsinki Commission. As part of his testimony, Hill said that the Supreme Court’s decision to allow sports gambling in America was comparable to the repeal of Prohibition. He concluded, “I faced many similar parliamentary committees in Europe, where I warned them about a tsunami of match fixing coming to European sport. At first, they did not listen. I was the lonely Cassandra prophetess waving my arms, warning of the dangers. Now, after over 30 national police investigations, they have woken up. I believe there is a clear and present danger to U.S. sports from this globalized sports gambling market.
