= Dane Tudor =

Australian / American freeskier (born 1989)

Personal information
- Full name: Dane Tudor
- Born: June 2, 1989 (age 37) Sydney, Australia
- Height: 5 ft 11 in (1.80 m)
- Weight: 165 lb (75 kg)

Sport
- Country: United States
- Sport: Freeskiing, Big Mountain

Dane Tudor (born June 2, 1989) is an Australian / American freeskier born in Sydney, Australia. He spent his time growing up between Palmer, Alaska and Rossland, British Columbia. Tudor still resides in both British Columbia and Alaska.

== Skiing career ==
Tudor is excels in both Big Mountain / Freeskiing and Freestyle skiing. He started skiing at 2 years of age and was ski racing by age 4. He continued to compete in ski racing until the age of 17 before switching full-time to the fast-growing sport of Freeskiing.

He continues to be one of the top placing competitors in the sport.

== Sponsors ==
- Scott
- Red Mountain
- Skullcandy
- Discrete Headwear
- Mons Royale

== Filmography ==
Tudor has appeared in many ski films for Poor Boyz Productions.

- WE - 2012
- The Grand Bizarre - 2011
- Revolver - 2010
- Every Day Is A Saturday - 2009
- Journal - 2008

== Competition results ==
- 1st - 2012 - Swatch Skiers Cup (Team Americas) - Big Mountain - Valle Nevado, Chile
- 4th - 2012 - One Hit Wonder Downunder - Thredbo Alpine Resort, Australia
- 1st - 2012 - Red Bull - Cold Rush, Silverton, Colorado
- 3rd - 2011 - Red Bull - Cold Rush, Silverton, Colorado
- 1st - 2009 - Canadian Open Freeskiing Championship, Rossland, BC
- 2nd - 2009 - Tignes Airwaves, Tignes, France (Part of Team North America)
- 1st - 2008 - Canadian Open Freeskiing Championship, Rossland, BC
- 3rd - 2008 - US Extreme Freeskiing Championship, Crested Butte, Colorado
- 4th - 2008 - Red Bull - Cold Rush, Rossland, BC
- 1st - 2007 - Lake Louise Smith Optics Junior - Big Mountain
- 1st - 2007 - Fernie Junior Freeskiing Championships
- 2nd - 2007 - Junior Canadian Open Freeskiing Championships
- 4th - 2007 - Lord Of The Parks, Slopestyle
- 2nd - 2007 - Ontic Rail Jam
- 2nd - 2007 - Industrial Surf Triple Crown, Slopestyle
- 3rd - 2007 - New Zealand Armageddon, Slopestyle
- 1st - 2006 - US Junior Extreme Freeskiing Championships
- 1st - 2005 - US Junior Extreme Freeskiing Championships
- 1st - 2004 - US Junior Extreme Freeskiing Championships
- 1st - 2004 - BC Provincials, Slalom (Canada)
- 1st - 2004 - BC Provincials, GS (Canada)
- 1st - 2004 - BC Provincials, Overall Champion (Canada)

== Industry awards ==
- 2011 IF3 Awards - "Best Male Performance - Nomination"
- 2010 ESPN Movie Awards - "Best Male Performance In A Leading Role - Winner"
- 2010 Powder Video Awards - "Breakout Performance - Winner"
- 2010 Powder Video Awards - "Best Male Performance - Nomination"
- 2010 IF3 Awards - "Best Male Performance - Nomination"
- 2009 IF3 Awards - "Best Male Performance - Winner"
- 2009 Powder Video Awards - "Best Male Performance - Nomination"
