= Jordan Dane =

American novelist (born 1953)

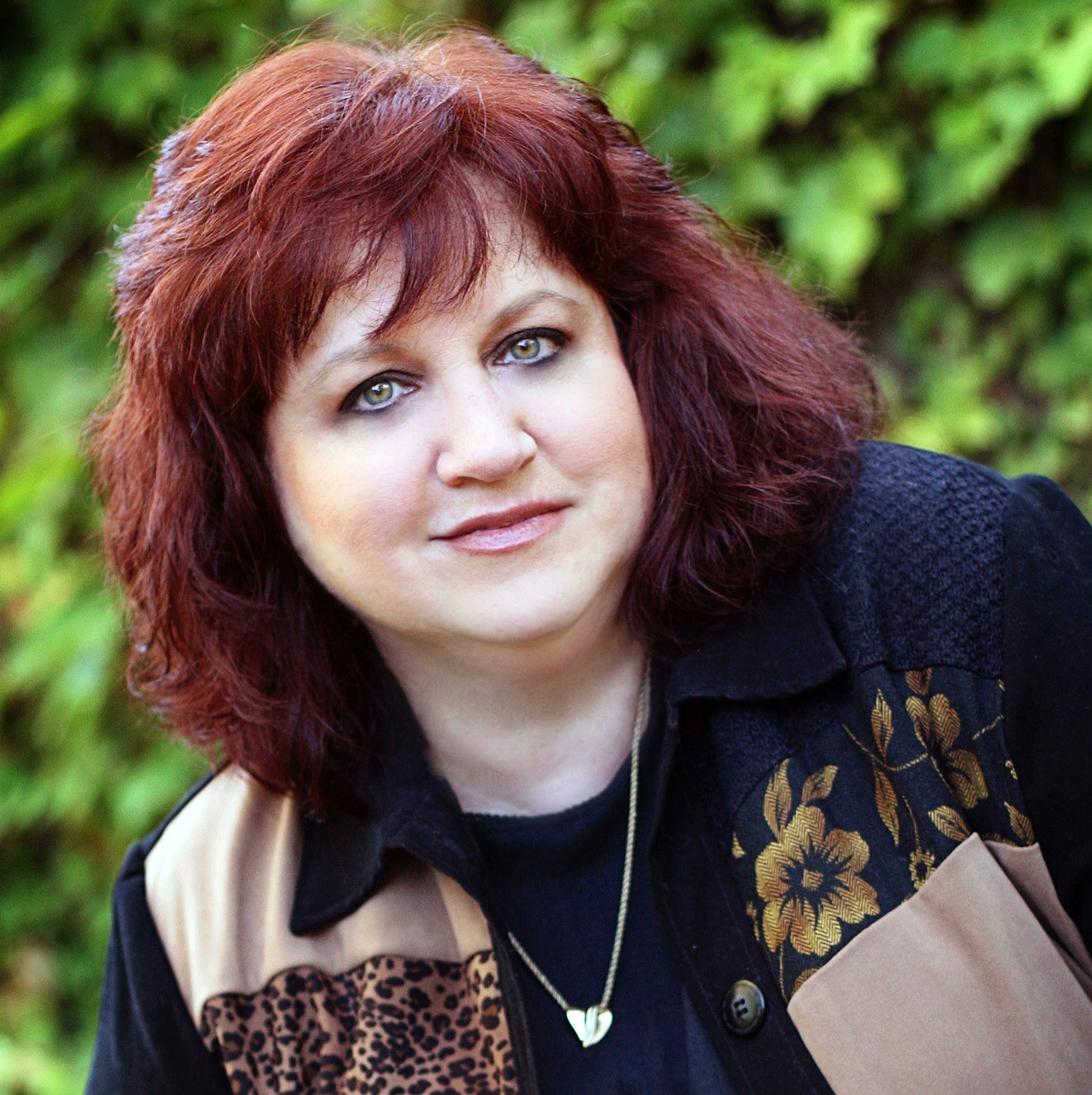
- Born: 1953 (age 72–73); United States
- Occupation: Novelist
- Writing career
- Period: 2003–present
- Genre: Thriller
- Website: jordandane.com

Jordan Dane (born 1953) is an American romantic thriller young adult fiction novelist. She sold her first three-book series in auction to Avon/HarperCollins in June 2006, and another three-book thriller series in May 2007. The first series was released April through June 2008. Titles and release dates for the second series were released beginning in February 2009.

Pursuing publication since 2003, Dane has received awards in 33 writing competitions, including Publishers Weekly Best Book of 2008 for Mass-Market for her debut novel, No One Heard Her Scream. She is a member of Romance Writers of America, Mystery Writers of America, Sisters in Crime, and the International Thriller Writers.

== Books ==
=== Adult fiction ===
- No One Heard Her Scream (April 1, 2008) ISBN 978-0-06-125278-5
- No One Left to Tell (May 1, 2008) ISBN 978-0-06-125375-1
- No One Lives Forever (June 1, 2008) ISBN 978-0-06-125376-8
- Evil Without A Face (Feb 1, 2009) ISBN 978-0-06-147412-5
- The Wrong Side of Dead (Nov 1, 2009) ISBN 978-0-06-147413-2
- The Echo of Violence (forthcoming, Sept 1, 2010) ISBN 978-0-06-147414-9
- Reckoning for the Dead (forthcoming, October 1, 2011) ISBN 978-0-06-196969-0

=== Young-adult fiction ===
- In The Arms of Stone Angels - A Young Adult Novel (April 1, 2011) ISBN 978-0-373-21029-9
- On a Dark Wing - A Young Adult Novel (December 1, 2011) ISBN 978-0-373-21041-1

== Sources ==
- "No One Heard Her Scream". Internet Voices Radio - Lillian Caldwell. August 1, 2007. Archived from the original on August 9, 2007.
- Bryen, Whitney. "Local author wins acclaim". The Oklahoman.
- "Publishers Weekly Best Books of 2008". Publishers Weekly.
- "Jordan Dane on "Authors on the Air" BlogTalkRadio Feb 26, 2009". 26 February 2009.
- "Jordan Dane on "Authors on the Air" BlogTalkRadio Nov 5, 2009". 5 November 2009.
- Holmes, Jeannie. "Romantic Times "Reviewers Choice" Award Finalists Announced". International Thriller Writer's The Big Thrill. Archived from the original on 2011-10-02.
- "National Readers Choice Awards - 2009". Archived from the original on 2011-10-01.
