= Dane Hussey =

American weightlifter (born 1949)

Dane Hussey (born July 26, 1949) is a weightlifter for the United States. His coaches are/were Gayle Hatch and Walter Imahara.

== Career ==
In the 56-kilogram weight class for the 55- to 59-year-old men, Hussey was able to put up a total of 110 kilograms to lead his weight class. Ten years later, he was able to total 100-kilograms in the 65- to 69-year-old age group in the 55-kilogram weight class.

== Weightlifting achievements ==
- Teenage National Champion (1968, 1969)
- Junior National Champion (1971)
- Pan American Games team member (1975)
- Olympic Games team member (First Alternate 1976)
- Blue Swords Invitational team member (1979, East Germany)
- Senior National Champion (1975, 1976)
- American Masters Champion (2004, 2006, 2008, 2010, 2011, 2013, 2014, 2015, 2020)
- National Masters Champion (2005, 2006, 2007, 2008, 2009, 2010, 2011, 2012, 2016, 2017, 2020)
- Pan American Masters Champion (2007, 2011, 2015, 2019, 2020)
- American Masters record holder in snatch, clean and jerk, and Total in the 56 kg and 62 kg weight classes.
- National Masters record holder in snatch, clean and jerk, and Total in the 55 kg and 56 kg weight classes.
- Pan American Masters record holder in snatch, clean and jerk, and Total in the 55 kg and 56 kg weight classes.
- Gold medal at the U.S. Masters Weightlifting Championships
