= Vana, Gujarat =

Human settlement in India

Vana was a former minor Rajput princely state on Saurashtra peninsula in Gujarat, Western India.

== History ==
Vadal was a non-salute princely state in Jhalawar prant, comprising Vana and two other villages, under Jhala Rajput Chieftains.

It had a population of 2,749 in 1901, yielding a state revenue of 26,000 Rupees (all from land; 1903–4) and paying 3,993 Rupees tribute to the Junagarh State.

During the British Raj, the petty state was under the colonial Eastern Kathiawar Agency.

== The Queens who hail from Vana state ==
According to the book Bangalorean (https://bookbangalorean.com/) by Kaveri Sinhji, published in December 2024, the village of Vana in Saurashtra has a notable historical association with the royal families of India. In 1900, Pratap Kunwarba, a nine-year-old daughter of a respected jagirdar (landholder) from Vana, married the 13-year-old heir to the Mysore throne, Sri Krishnaraja Wadiyar IV. As Maharani of Mysore, Pratap Kunwarba resided in Bangalore Palace and spent considerable time in the city.

In the 1930s, her sister, Raj Kunwarba, who became the Maharani of Gondal State, acquired 32 acres of land adjacent to Bangalore Palace and established Jayamahal Palace, where she lived and raised her seven children. Their brother, Rana Lakshman Sinhji, later moved to Bangalore as well, setting up his residence, known as "Beaufort," on a neighboring 10-acre property. There, he raised one daughter, two sons, and 13 grandchildren.

The ties between Vana and Mysore led to a series of royal marriages between northern and southern princely states, as well as a trend among royals to establish summer residences in Bangalore, drawn by its proximity to the Mysore royal family. Notably, the five Gondal princesses married into prominent royal families of Orchha, Palitana, Bhavnagar, Wadhwan, and Dharampur, earning Vana the distinction of being a small village that produced one of the highest numbers of queens in India.

== The Feudal Era: A Small Princely State (1800s-1947) ==
During the British Raj, Vana was classified as a minor princely state in the Kathiawar region of Saurashtra ruled by Jhala Rajput Chiefs. It was part of the Eastern Kathiawar Agency, through which the British administration managed relations with the princely states of the region. The state retained internal administrative authority and collected revenue within its territory. The local Jhala Rajput chieftains handled day to day village administration and collected local land revenues, but they operated under british oversight and paid an annual tribute to the larger Junagadh State. Rather than a large sovereign country, it was a small hereditary estate which covered approximately 24 square miles and included Vana, Ghanad and Bakarthali whose boundaries were broken up and separated by land belonging to another minor state called Rajpur.

== The Democratic Transition: Post-1948 Integration ==
Following the end of British rule, Vana ceased to function as a separate princely estate and surrendered, as the princely states of Kathiawar were integrated into the Indian Union. In 1948, Vana became a part of the United State of Kathiawar, later known as Saurashtra State. With the reorganisation of states, it became part of Gujarat in 1960.

The former administrative centre of the estate subsequently lost its status as a princely seat and became a village under the modern local-government system. The territory that had previously been administered as part of the Vana state was incorporated into the wider administrative structure of the region.

Today, the village no longer holds jurisdiction over neighboring lands. Vana is now administered under Lakhtar Taluka in Surendranagar district, Gujarat.

== Social Structure and Demography ==
The historical population of Vana reflected the traditional community structure of the Jhalawar region. The Jhala Rajputs formed the ruling and principal landholding group, while the wider population consisted largely of agrarian communities, like Kanbi (Patidar). Other communities included mercantile groups (mahajans) involved in local trade, as well as pastoral and artisan community like silk weavers (nana mahajans) that supported the economy of the estate.

The 2011 Census records Vana as having predominantly non-SC/ST population, with Scheduled Castes forming a negligible section of the village and no Scheduled Tribes recorded.

Within this social ecosystem, surnames were closely tied to ancestral identity, clans and community roots. In the Kathiawar region, some families adopted toponymic (geographically derived) surnames reflecting their place of origin. Vanvi (or Vanavi) is associated with Vana and is understood as referring to a hereditary surname by some families, majorly including those from mercantile and artisan backgrounds. The surname remains in use among descendants of families tracing their origins to Vana, including those who later settled elsewhere in Gujarat and beyond.
