= Dane Rawlins =

Irish dressage rider

Personal information
- Born: April 1, 1956 (age 70)

Sport
- Country: Ireland
- Sport: Equestrian
- Event: Dressage

Dane Rawlins is a British born dressage rider competing for Ireland. He competed at the 2013 European Championships in Herning and was the founder and dressage show organizer at the All England Jumping Course at Hickstead for 27 years. In January 2026, Rawlins was appointed Chef d’Équipe and Technical Lead of the Australian national dressage team, with his appointment extending through to the 2028 Los Angeles Olympic Games.

== Early life and education ==
Rawlins was born and raised in Brixton and Dulwich, South London. He attended Tulse Hill Comprehensive School and later continued his education at Chelsfield and Bromley. Rawlins then pursued further studies at Orpington College and Hull University.

== Introduction to equestrianism ==
While his early years involved boxing, Rawlins developed a passion for equestrianism and learned to ride at Dulwich Riding School. This marked the beginning of his journey into dressage.

== Training and development ==
- International Training: Rawlins furthered his equestrian career by training abroad, initially in Germany as a working student under the mentorship of George Theodorescu. He also trained in Canada with the esteemed Christilot Boylen.
- Return to the UK: After his international experiences, Rawlins returned to the UK, where he focused on training and competing in dressage at a high level.

== Competitive career ==
- Olympic aspirations: Rawlins was shortlisted for the Seoul 1988 Olympics with his horse, Optimist.
- Training Kirsty Mepham for the Sydney 2000 Olympics: Rawlins played a crucial role in training Kirsty Mepham and her horse, Dikkiloo, for the Sydney 2000 Olympics. His guidance and expertise helped Mepham achieve her goal of competing on the world stage.
- Coaching Tina Cooke for the 2012 London Games and WEG in Caen
- Reserve rider for London 2012 Olympics: In 2012, Rawlins was named a reserve rider for the London Olympics, competing on Espoire.
- Tokyo 2020 Olympics: Rawlins was selected for the Tokyo 2020 Olympics, continuing his successful career at the highest level.
- 2013 European Championships in Herning: Rawlins competed at the 2013 European Dressage Championships in Herning, Denmark, further cementing his status as a top-level competitor in international dressage.

== Contributions to the equestrian community ==
- British Young Riders Dressage Scheme (BYRDS): Rawlins co-founded the British Young Riders Dressage Scheme with Egon Von Greyerz, a program that has been instrumental in developing young dressage talent in the UK.
- Ministerial Nominee to the Sports Council: Rawlins was appointed as a Ministerial Nominee to the Sports Council under Ian Sproat MP, reflecting his influence in the equestrian and sports communities.

== Leadership roles and recognition ==
- Board memberships: Rawlins served on the Board of Dressage Group UK for 10 years, contributing to the strategic direction of dressage in the UK. He also served on the Board of Dressage Ireland and was a board member of the International Dressage Trainers Club.
- Awards and honors:
  - British Horse Society Trainers Award
  - British Equestrian Federation Medal of Honour
  - British Equestrian Federation Elite Coach
- Australian Dressage Chef d’Équipe: In January 2026, Rawlins was appointed Chef d’Équipe and Technical Lead of the Australian national dressage team, with his appointment extending through to the 2028 Olympic Games in Los Angeles.

== Event organization ==
- Hickstead: For 27 years, Rawlins was responsible for organizing dressage events at Hickstead, including the Youth Under 21 European Championships and the Senior Open European Championships in 2003. His work helped establish Hickstead as one of the premier venues for equestrian competitions.

== Change of nationality and continued success ==
In October 2010, Rawlins changed his nationality to Ireland, continuing to compete and contribute to the sport on an international scale.
