= Dane Neller =

American businessman

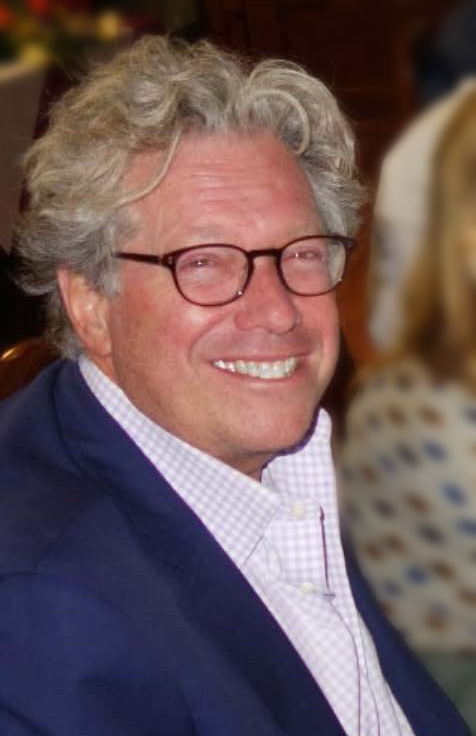
- Neller in 2018
- Born: Dane Joseph Neller; April 30, 1956 (age 70); Evanston, Illinois, US
- Education: Yale University (BA, MA, JD), New College, Oxford
- Occupation: Businessman
- Known for: Founder of current incarnation of Shakespeare & Co. (2015)

Dane Joseph Neller (born April 30, 1956) is an American businessman and entrepreneur. He is best known as former chief executive of Dean & DeLuca, On Demand Books, and Shakespeare & Co.

Neller is CEO of New York-based bookstore chain Shakespeare & Co. and is its largest shareholder since purchasing the company in 2015. Under his leadership the company has added literary cafes and incorporated a point of sale state-of-the-art 3D book printing service that uses recycled paper and produces bookstore quality paperbacks through a patented technology. Neller is also the CEO of On Demand Books LLC, which uses the printing technology in its Espresso Book Machine, which was named on Time magazine's “Best Inventions of 2007” list.

== Early life and education ==
Born in Evanston, Illinois, and raised in Highland Park, Illinois, Neller attended Deerfield High School in nearby Deerfield, Illinois. He attended Yale University as a political science major and graduated in 1979 with membership in Phi Beta Kappa and a B.A. summa cum laude, additionally earning an M.A. in political science with honors in 1980. Neller then studied for an M. Litt. in philosophy at New College, Oxford, before returning to Yale, where he earned a JD from Yale Law School.

An accomplished tennis player, Neller was ranked 30th in the nation as a young junior. He played college tennis as an undergraduate and played number one on the Oxford University Lawn Tennis team.

== Career ==
Following graduation from Yale Law School, Neller began his career at Morgan Stanley as an investment banker (1984–1987). After Morgan Stanley, Neller held various investment banking and private equity positions before joining Dean & Deluca in 1995 as an owner and CEO, a position he held until 2005. He and his partner, board chairman Leslie Rudd, expanded the New York-based gourmet food store chain into a national and global franchise.

Neller sold his interest in Dean & Deluca in 2005 when he and Random House editorial director Jason Epstein founded On Demand Books. The patented Espresso Book Machine® (EBM) print-at-retail technology was developed and commercialized by On Demand Books, now owned by Shakespeare & Co. The machine can print perfect bound books in a few minutes at the point of sale. In 2015 Neller and partners purchased the last remaining U. S. Shakespeare & Co. store, a former chain. Under Neller's ownership the iconic store has been recreated as a new iteration that now includes a literary café and incorporates the EBM at the point of sale. The company aims to become a national chain. At this point, there are three Shakespeare bookstores, two in Manhattan and one in Rittenhouse Square in Philadelphia. With access to millions of titles, the machine can print paperbacks in minutes while a customer waits. It is also a vehicle for self-publishing.

== Awards ==
Neller and partner Jason Epstein won the 2011 Creative Disruptor Award for the Espresso Book Machine technology.

== Public service ==
Neller is on the board of trustees for New York City's Hunter College.
