= Dane Jackson =

Dane Jackson may refer to:

- Dane Jackson (ice hockey) (born 1970), Canadian ice hockey player and coach
- Dane Jackson (American football) (born 1996), American football cornerback
