= Dane Beesley =

Australian photographer

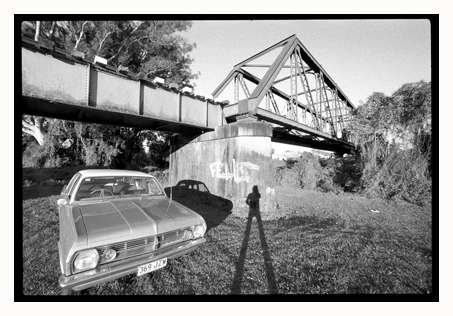
- Born: 1978 (age 47–48); Brisbane, Australia
- Known for: Photographer

Dane Beesley is an Australian photographer. Beesley was born in Brisbane in 1978. After studying photography in Brisbane, Beesley worked as an assistant for a commercial photography studio before starting his own career.

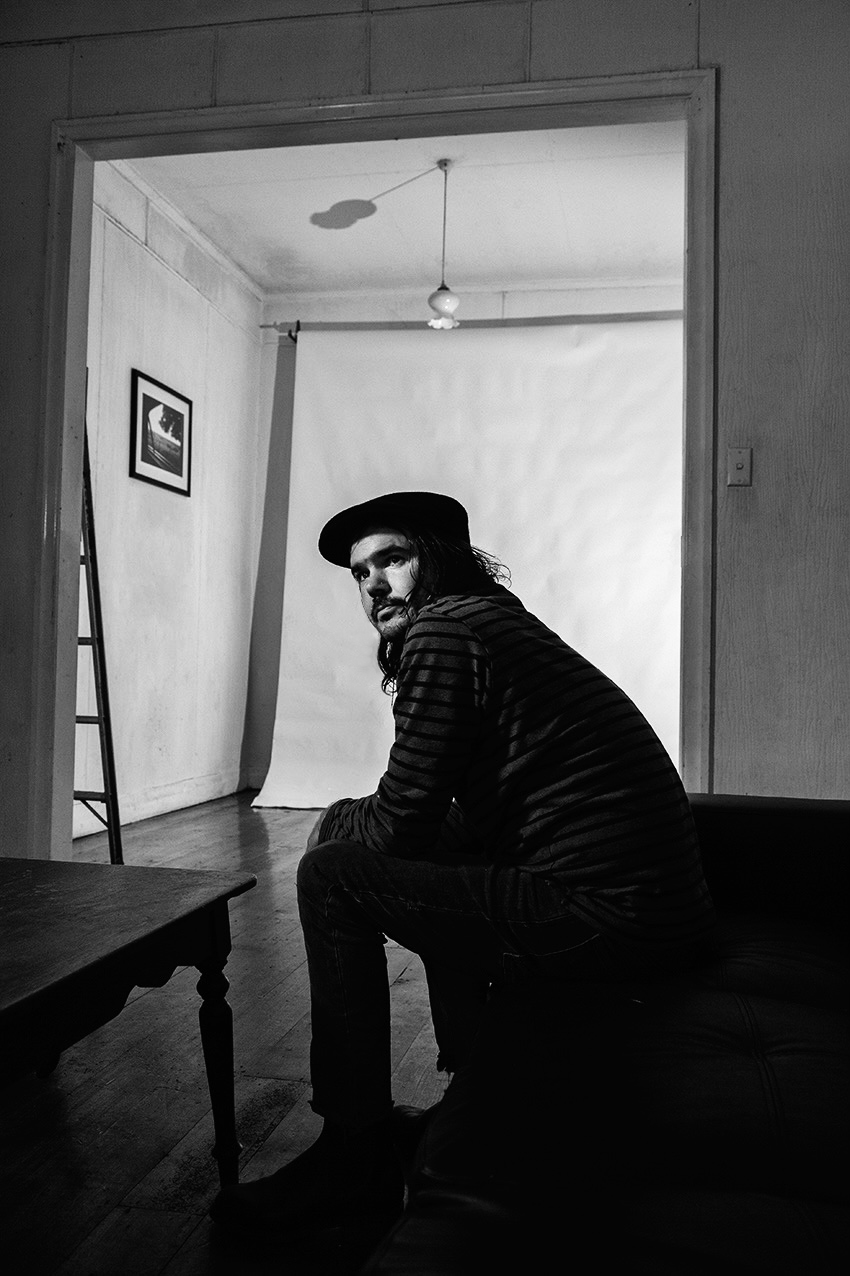
Australian photographer Dane Beesley

== Work ==
Splitting the Seconds: A Photographer's Journal published in 2011 is Beesley's account of ten years behind the camera, behind the scenes of Australian rock 'n' roll.

Beesley co-founded the street print magazine, Text & Image, in 2013 and worked as its pictorial editor. The magazine featured emerging artists, photographers, and writers in West End, Brisbane. Text & Image came to an end when its location, the Absoe Building, was demolished, making way for the development of modern apartments.

In 2016, Beesley presented his collection,"Shades." This exhibition and book marked a significant point in his artistic journey. "Shades" is noted as being the beginning of his fine art photography series that captures crisp blue skies and painterly landscapes.

Beesley received a special mention for the photograph "Home" in the 2023 Olive Cotton Award, a significant biennial award celebrating Australian photographic portraiture. In 2025, Beesley was awarded The Olive Cotton Award People's Choice for his portrait of Eamon Sandwith, the frontman of the band The Chats. The photograph was noted for providing an intimate and unfiltered glimpse into Sandwith, deliberately stripping away the high energy and dynamism typically associated with his stage persona.

In 2025, Beesley was selected to be featured in the Thames & Hudson publication Exposure: Contemporary Photographers in Australia & New Zealand, by Amber Creswell Bell.

In 2026, Beesley won the Brisbane Portrait Prize's Performing Arts and Music Industry Award for his portrait of Kamilaroi and Ngemba Elder Uncle Bob Weatherall.

== Books ==
- Splitting the Seconds: A Photographer's Journal (released 2011) ISBN 978-0-646-55215-6
- The Road (released 2012) ISBN 978-0-646-58254-2
- Shades (released 2016) ISBN 978-0-646-94961-1
- Yelseeb Enad (released 2017) ISBN 978-1-366-06890-3
- Exposure: Contemporary Photographers in Australia & New Zealand. Author Amber Creswell Bell, Thames & Hudson. (released 2025) ISBN 978-1-760-76486-9
