= Play the Game (NGO) =

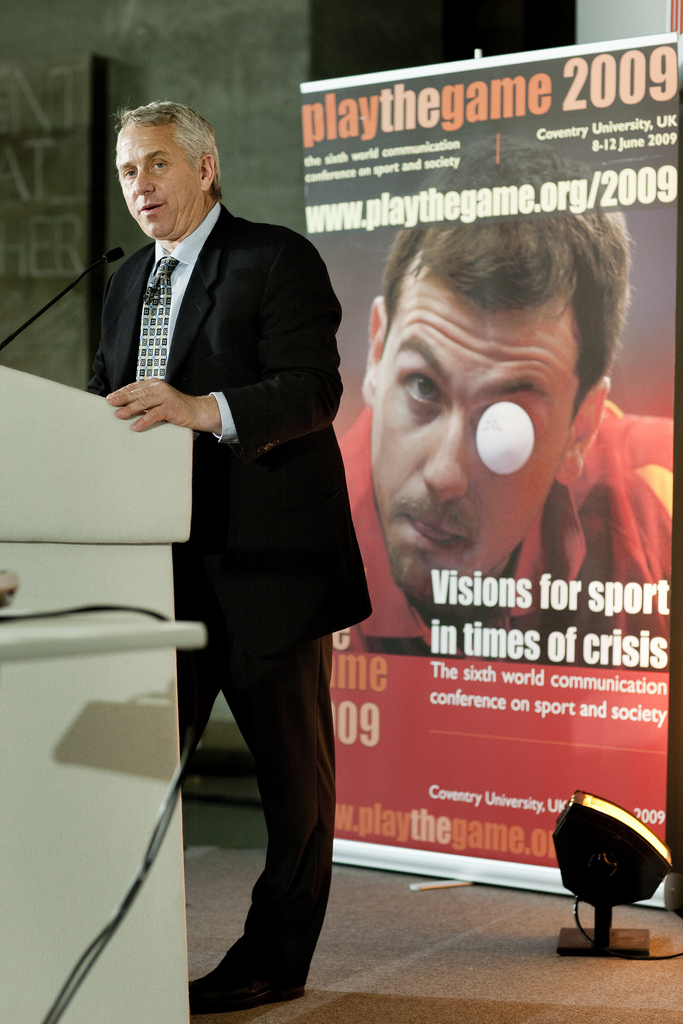
Cyclist Greg LeMond addresses the Play the Game conference in Coventry, UK in 2009

Play the Game is an international initiative and conference under the auspices of the Danish Institute for Sports Studies which aims to strengthen sport's ethical foundation and promote democracy, transparency and freedom of expression in sport. "Play the Game" is both the name given to the organisation and its biennial conferences. It has been described as a "watchdog that values integrity in both sport and the journalists that cover it". Play the Game is headquartered in the Danish city of Aarhus and is supported by yearly grants from the Danish Ministry of Culture through the Danish Institute for Sports Studies.

== Origins ==
The initiative was founded in 1997, when the Danish Gymnastics and Sports Associations (DGI) celebrated the centenary of its sports political weekly magazine, Ungdom & Idræt (Youth & Sport). To mark the event, DGI hosted an international media seminar on sports politics, called "Sport, Media and Civil Society" at its headquarters in Vingsted. The conference resulted in the formation of the Sports Intelligence Unit, an international network of journalists, sportsmen and women and sports administrators which was dissolved in 2004 as Play the Game was established as an independent institution with the backing of all major domestic sports organisations and the Danish Ministry of Culture. The institution came into being at a time when the extent of corruption and doping in sport, especially professional cycling, was becoming increasingly apparent, and doping, corruption and match-fixing remain some of its core themes.

== International activities ==
Play the Game is represented in the European Union's Expert Group on Good Governance in Sports, established by the Council of Ministers, as well as the Consultative Committee of the Enlarged Partial Agreement on Sport under the Council of Europe. It was invited to give testimony before the German Parliament in September 2011, the European Parliament in December 2012 and the Commonwealth Advisory Body on Sport in June 2013.

It is an advisor to the Editorial Board of the International Council of Sport Science and Physical Education and regularly gives lectures at seminars and conferences around the world. These have included Beijing Sport University (2013), the 15th International Anti-Corruption Conference in Brasília (2012), Birkbeck Sports Business School at London University (2012), and the 20th conference of the European Association for Sports Management (2012). Seminars have been held in Brazil, Venezuela, Argentina, Colombia, Slovenia, Belgium and Switzerland.

Since 2012, Play the Game has also been the coordinator of the Action for Good Governance in International Sports Organisations (AGGIS), an initiative launched in co-operation with Loughborough University, Utrecht University, the University of Leuven, the German Sport University Cologne, IDHEAP Lausanne, the University of Ljubljana and the European Journalism Centre in Maastricht.

== Current organization ==
In January 2011, Play the Game merged with the Danish Institute for Sports Studies, an independent institution set up by the Danish Ministry of Culture. Stanis Elsborg is currently head of Play the Game, while the Director of the institute is Søren Ørgaard (as of 2025).

== Conferences ==
Including the initial seminar, Play the Game has held 12 international conferences, most recently in Colorado Springs, CO, USA, in October 2019. Other conferences include Copenhagen in 2000, 2002 and 2005, Reykjavík, Iceland, in 2007, Coventry, United Kingdom, in 2009, Cologne, Germany, in 2011, Aarhus, Denmark, in 2013 and 2015, Eindhoven, Netherlands, in 2017 and Odense, Denmark in 2022.

The conferences cover a wide range of themes. Issues covered include corruption and ethics in sport, sports management, sports journalism, and sports participation. They aim to strengthen the basic ethical values of sport by encouraging stakeholders in sport to engage in open and unrestricted debate on sports challenges and their possible solutions.

Each conference has hosted over 100 speakers. Previous speakers have included British investigative journalist and author Andrew Jennings, former World Anti Doping Association President and present IOC member Richard W Pound, Italian anti-doping expert Alessandro Donati, Guardian journalist David Conn, three-time Tour de France winner Greg LeMond, Canadian author Declan Hill, former Newcastle United goalkeeper Shaka Hislop, and President of the Union Cycliste Internationale (UCI) Pat McQuaid.

== Play the Game Award ==
The Play the Game Award is a prize awarded by Play the Game to a person or persons who have shown "remarkable personal courage and commitment to creating a better sports community". It has been awarded since 2002. Its first recipient was Canadian investigative journalist Laura Robinson. Other recipients include Argentinian volleyball whisteblower Mario Goijman, Italian anti-doping fighter Alessandro Donati (2007) and Canadian journalist and author Declan Hill (2009). Two investigative journalists, Britain's Andrew Jennings and Germany's Jens Weinreich, shared the award in 2011. Richard W. Pound, Canadian IOC member and former WADA president, received the Play the Game Award in 2013, and in 2015, the award was given to Canadian Bob Munro and Mathare Youth Sports Association. In 2017, Russian whistleblowers Yulia and Vitaly Stepanov as well as the German investigative journalist Hajo Seppelt received the award. In 2019, the award was given to Nancy Hogshead-Makar, CEO of Champion Women, USA.
