= Danes (surname) =

Danes is a surname. Notable people with the surname include:

- Anna Danes (born 1969), American singer-songwriter
- Claire Danes (born 1979), American actress
- Kerry and Kay Danes (born 1958 and 1967)

== Fictional characters ==
- Luke Danes, a main character in the television series Gilmore Girls
- Oswald Danes, a character in the television series Torchwood

== See also ==
- Dane (name)
