= Fess Hotel =

- U.S. National Register of Historic Places
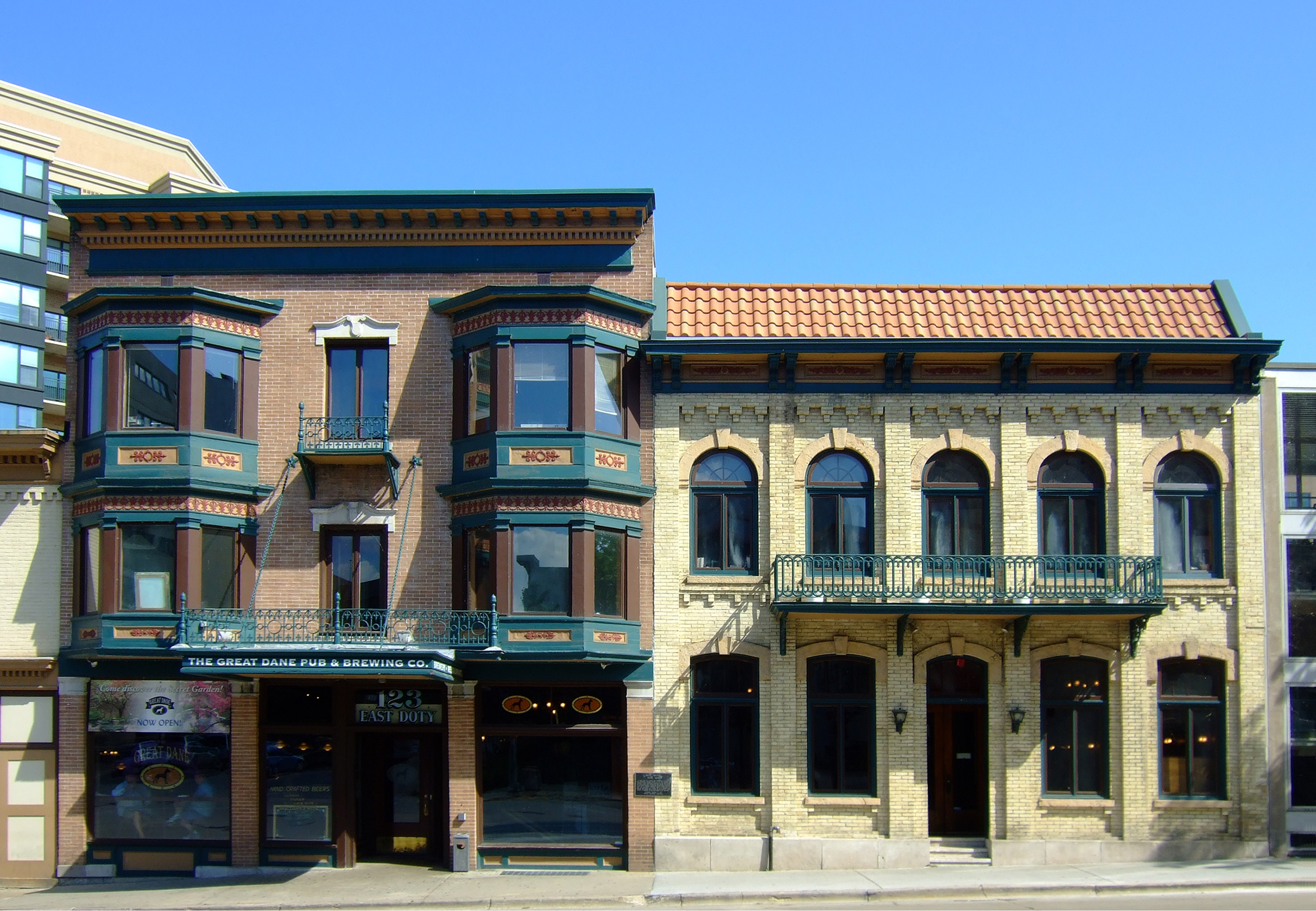
- Fess Hotel
- Location: 123 E. Doty St. Madison, Wisconsin
- Architect: J. O. Gordon and F. W. Paunack
- NRHP reference No.: 78003204
- Added to NRHP: September 21, 1978

The Fess Hotel was a hotel/restaurant begun by George Fess in the 1850s two blocks east of the capitol in Madison, Wisconsin. Through various configurations and remodels, the hotel served all classes of travelers and diners under the Fess family until 1972 - one of the longest-running service establishments in Madison. Its exterior also showcases unusually intact 19th century architecture. In 1978 the building was added to the National Register of Historic Places. In 2021, the building next to the Fess hotel was demolished, revealing the hotel's intact ghost sign on the side of the hotel.

== History ==
George Fess was born in Gloucestershire, England in 1816. He immigrated to America in the 1830s and worked as a steward on a steamer on Lake Michigan. In 1842 he came to Madison, before the state capital was even a village. By the mid-1850s he had a grocery business and "eating house" on Doty Street (then Clymer Street), next to the current hotel.

It's unclear when Fess began renting rooms, but in 1871 he built the first part of the two-story cream brick structure on the right in the photo. By 1880 the hotel had 34 guest rooms and operated a livery stable behind that could handle 60 horses. George died and his wife Anna remarried, bought two more adjacent buildings, and in 1883 had the cream brick façade extended to five bays, expanding the hotel into the newly purchased buildings. The windows on this section have brick hood moulds - round with keystones on the second story and flatter arched with keystones on the first. (These first-story windows are still intact from the 1870s - giving a rare glimpse of how a typical business looked before plate glass was invented in the 1860s.) Pilasters separate the windows and a wrought iron balcony separates the floors. Above the second floor is a paneled entablature and above that a mansard roof covered with tin shaped to look like tile - appropriate for the Italianate-styled brickwork. Around the 1880s a room cost $1.40 per night and a meal cost 40 cents.

In the 1890s George Jr. bought more adjacent property and in 1901 remodeled pre-existing buildings to add the 3-story section on the left in the photo to the hotel. This section was designed by architects Gordon and Paunack in a commercial form of the Queen Anne style which was by then popular. The exterior is rose-colored brick. At street level are large shop windows. Above are the three-sided two-story oriels with pilasters at the corners. Between the oriels are French doors opening onto wrought iron balconies. At the top is an entablature with dentils and modillions beneath the cornice.

The Fess Hotel was close to the capitol, businesses, and railway stations. It served a variety of travelers: legislators, jurors, traveling salesmen, everyday people. Prices were reasonable. It was a temperance hotel through all the years the Fesses ran it, not serving alcohol, and for that reason Carrie Nation stayed there in 1901.

The hotel remained in the Fess family until it was sold in 1973. The building then housed a restaurant from 1975 to 1994. In 1978, it was designated a landmark by the Madison Landmarks Commission. It was added to the NRHP the same year, for its remarkably long record of service (about 120 years) under one family to the community and for its intact 19th century architecture. Since the mid-1990s the buildings have housed the Great Dane Pub.
