= Michal Váňa =

Czech footballer (born 1963)

- Vana in 2011

Personal information
- Date of birth: 13 May 1963 (age 63)
- Place of birth: Czechoslovakia
- Position: Forward

Michal Váňa (born 13 May 1963) is a former football player from Czechoslovakia, who played professionally in Europe and Asia.

== Early career ==
Váňa played for numerous clubs in his native country of Czechoslovakia, including Dukla Prague, Slavia Prague and Benešov.

== Career in Asia ==
Váňa was part of the Singapore Lions Malaysian League team, which won the M-League and Malaysia Cup double in 1994. He disappeared in mid-season, and remains a fugitive. The ex-Malaysia Cup star was arrested and charged with six counts of match-fixing. He escaped from the country before he could be tried in court, leaving on a different passport after his original one had been confiscated. According to a Singapore newspaper, Váňa's Bayshore Park condominium was almost completely emptied. He was given a lifetime ban from football by FIFA, which was later annulled. He was last seen in Singapore on 28 September 1994, two days before his trial was to begin. In 2011, an Australian production company named Touchwood Productions claimed to have found Váňa, and they interviewed him for a documentary on the life of Abbas Saad, who was also linked to Váňa. Saad was charged and given a lifetime ban from football.

The Documentary featuring Michal Vana, titled "The Abbas Saad Story" was released and aired in Malaysia in March 2015 on ASTRO TV.
