= Dann =

- Language: Middle English

Origin
- Origin: Dene
- Meaning: Valley

Other names
- Variant forms: Dan, Dane

Dann is an English surname. It is a toponymic surname which came from Middle English dene and Old English denu, "valley". Variant spellings include Dan and Dane.

According to statistics compiled by Patrick Hanks on the basis of the 2011 United Kingdom census and the Census of Ireland 2011, 2,666 people on the island of Great Britain and 54 on the island of Ireland bore the surname Dann as of 2011. In the 1881 United Kingdom census there had been 1,858 people with the surname Dann, primarily at Kent, Sussex, London, and Norfolk. The 2010 United States census found 3,735 people with the surname Dann, making it the 8,775th-most-common name in the country. This represented a decrease from 4,062 (7,550th most-common) in the 2000 census. In both censuses, nearly nine-tenths of the bearers of the surname identified as non-Hispanic white, and about six percent as non-Hispanic Black or African American.

People with this surname include:

== Artists and musicians ==
- Hollis Dann (1861–1939), American music educator and choral director
- Stan Dann (1931–2008), American wood carver
- Georgie Dann (1940–2021), French singer
- Larry Dann (born 1941), British film and television actor
- Steven Dann (born 1953), Canadian violist
- Penny Dann (1964–2014), British children's book illustrator
- Sophie-Louise Dann (born 1969), British musical theatre actress
- Lance Dann (fl. 1994–present), British sound and radio artist

== Sportspeople ==
- Reg Dann (1916–1948), English football midfielder
- Gordon Dann (born 1944), Australian rules footballer
- Donald Dann (1949–2005), Australian Paralympic athlete and table tennis player
- Kevin Dann (1958–2021), Australian rugby league footballer
- Scott Dann (boxer) (born 1974), English amateur boxer
- Scott Dann (born 1987), English football centre-back
- Thomas Dann (born 1981), English cricketer
- Walter Dann (fl. 1968–1976), Canadian Paralympic athlete

== Writers ==
- George Landen Dann (1904–1977), Australian playwright, writer, and draftsman
- Colin Dann (born 1943), British writer of children's books
- Jack Dann (born 1945) American science fiction writer
- Lotta Dann, New Zealand journalist
- Trevor Dann (born 1951), British writer and broadcaster
- Patty Dann (born 1953), American novelist and nonfiction writer

== Others ==
- Christian Adam Dann (1758–1837), German Lutheran pastor
- Wallace Dann (1847–1934), American local politician in Norwalk, Connecticut
- Alf Dann (1893–1953), British trade union leader
- Belinda Dann (1900–2007), Indigenous Australian woman known as a member of the Stolen Generation
- Bob Dann (1914–2008), Anglican Archbishop of Melbourne, Australia
- Michael Dann (1921–2016), American television executive
- Mary Dann and Carrie Dann (respectively 1923–2005 and 1931–2021), Native American activists
- Laurie Dann (1957–1988), American murderer
- Marc Dann (born 1962), American politician
- Tim Dann, British voice actor

== See also ==
- Dan (disambiguation)
- Danu (disambiguation)
- Wimm-Bill-Dann Foods, a Russian food producer
