= Dan =

Dan or DAN may refer to:

== People ==
- Dan (name), including a list of people with the name
  - Dan (king), several kings of Denmark
- Dan people, an ethnic group located in West Africa
  - Dan language, a Mande language spoken primarily in Côte d'Ivoire and Liberia
- Dan (son of Jacob), one of the 12 sons of Jacob/Israel in the Bible
  - Tribe of Dan, one of the 12 tribes of Israel descended from Dan
  - Danel, the hero figure of Ugarit who might have inspired stories of the biblical figure
- Crown Prince Dan, prince of Yan in ancient China

== Places ==
- Dan (ancient city), the biblical location also called Dan, and identified with Tel Dan
- Dan, Israel, a kibbutz
- Dan, subdistrict of Kap Choeng District, Thailand
- Dan, West Virginia, an unincorporated community in the United States
- Dan River (disambiguation)
- Danzhou, formerly Dan County, China
- Gush Dan (Hebrew: גּוּשׁ דָּן, lit. 'Dan bloc'), the metropolitan area of Tel Aviv in Israel

== Organizations ==
- Dan-Air, a defunct airline in the United Kingdom
- Dan Bus Company, a public transport company in Israel
- Dan Hotels, a hotel chain in Israel
- Defeat Autism Now! (DAN!), a defunct, controversial program of the Autism Research Institute
- Direct Action Network, a confederation of anarchist and anti-authoritarian affinity groups, collectives, and organizations
- Disabled People's Direct Action Network, a former disability rights campaign in the UK
- Divers Alert Network, a non-profit organization for Scuba diving

== Science ==
- daN (decanewton), unit of force—see newton
- DAN (protein), a family of tgf beta signaling protein inhibitors
- Dorsal attention network, a sensory orienting system in the brain
- Dynamic Albedo of Neutrons, a scientific instrument on board the Curiosity rover

== Other ==
- Dàn or Dangbé, a snake deity in the Kingdom of Dahomey (in present-day Benin)
- Dan, a 1914 film starring Lois Meredith
- Dan (Chinese opera), a female role in Chinese opera
- Dan (cuneiform), a cuneiform sign
- Dan (newspaper), a daily newspaper published in Montenegro
- Dan (rank) in Japanese, Chinese and Korean martial arts, go, and shogi
- "Dan", a song by Owen Riegling from the 2024 album Bruce County (From the Beginning)
- English corruption of the title Dominus
- Do Anything Now (DAN), a jailbreak for ChatGPT
- Dan (volume), a traditional Chinese measure unit of volume
- Dan (weight), a traditional Chinese measure unit of weight
- Dan Hibiki, a Street Fighter character

== See also ==
- List of people with given name Dan
- Daniel (disambiguation)
- Danny (disambiguation)
- Dane
