= Dan (name) =

Masculine given name

- Gender: Masculine
- Language: English, Hebrew, Hungarian, Romanian, Chinese, Japanese, Korean

Origin
- Meaning: English: "valley"; Hebrew: "to judge"; Japanese (檀): Euonymus hamiltonianus

Other names
- Variant forms: English: Surname: Dann, Dane; Given name: Daniel, Danny; Chinese, Korean: Tan

Dan is a name in various cultures. As a given name it is often short for Daniel. It is also a surname with multiple origins.

== Given name ==
=== Origins as a given name ===
Dan is an old Scandinavian given name with several disputed origins. The most likely theory is that it originated from the Old Norse ethnonym danir for Danes. This in turn originated from the Proto-Germanic masculine word *daniz. There are several historical variants including *Halbadaniz "half-Dane", as well as *Daniskaz "Danish" (where the *-iskaz suffix is ancestral to modern English -ish).

The name Dan is also a Hebrew given name, after Dan, the fifth son of Jacob with Bilhah and founder of the Israelite Tribe of Dan. It is also (along with the variant Danny) a given name or a nickname for people named Daniel or possibly Jordan.

== Surname ==
=== Origins ===
As an English surname, Dan is a variant spelling of Dann. Dann, another variant spelling of which is Dane, is a toponymic surname which originates from the Middle English dene and Old English denu, "valley".

The Hebrew surname Dan (Hebrew: דן) is a biblical name which refers to the tribe of Dan. As a given name it first appears in Genesis 30.

The Hungarian surname Dán is an abbreviation of Dániel.

Dan may be the spelling of multiple Chinese surnames, based on their pronunciation in different varieties of Chinese; they are listed below by their spelling in Hanyu Pinyin, which reflects the standard Mandarin pronunciation:

- Dān (丹 'red')
- Dàn (但)
- Chén (陳/陈), spelled Dan based on its Hainanese pronunciation (Hainanese Transliteration Scheme: Ddan^{2}). This spelling is found for example in Singapore.

There are multiple Japanese surnames which are romanised as Dan, including:

- 檀, meaning Euonymus hamiltonianus, and also used in the names of various species of other trees, including sandalwoods
- 団 (Kyūjitai: 團), meaning "group"

There are three separate Korean surnames spelled in the Revised Romanization of Korean as Dan (Korean: 단; MR: Tan), each written with a different hanja. Bearers of each surname identify with a number of distinct bon-gwan, which are hometowns of clan lineages.

- The most common, Cheunggye Dan (段; 층계 단), means "stairs". This character is also used to write the Chinese surname now pronounced Duàn in Mandarin. Major clans with this surname include:
  - The Gangeum Dan clan ("Gangeum" being the Sino-Korean reading of the name of the city of Jiangyin in Jiangsu, China), who claim descent from Dan Il-ha, a Ming Dynasty official whose great-great-grandson Dan Hui-sang was dispatched to Korea during the 1592–1598 Japanese invasions of Korea
  - The Gangneung Dan Clan, who claim descent from Dan Gan-mok (단간목; 段干木), an official under Chungnyeol of Goryeo.
- The second most common, Hot Dan (單; 홑 단), means "single" or "one". This character is also used to write the Chinese surname now pronounced Shàn in Mandarin.
- The least common, Kkeut Dan (端; 끝단), means "end".

=== Statistics ===
In South Korea, the 2000 census found 1,429 people belonging to 437 households with the surname Dan meaning "stairs". There were also 122 people belonging to 40 households with the surname Dan meaning "single", and 34 people belonging to nine households with the surname Dan meaning "end".

According to statistics cited by Patrick Hanks, there were 284 people on the island of Great Britain and 13 people on the island of Ireland with the surname Dan as of 2011. There had been 177 bearers of the surname in Great Britain in 1881, primarily in Devonshire and Cornwall.

The 2010 United States census found 2,599 people with the surname Dan, making it the 12,012th-most-common name in the country. This represented an increase from 2,315 (12,317th-most-common) in the 2000 Census. In both censuses, about half of the bearers of the surname identified as White, and one-quarter as Asian. Dan was the 1,670th-most-common surname among respondents to the 2000 Census who identified as Asian.

=== People ===
==== Chinese surnames Dān (丹) and Dàn (但) ====
- Dan Duyu (但杜宇; 1897–1972), Chinese film director
- Judy Dan (但茱迪; born 1930), Chinese-born American actress
- Yang Dan (neuroscientist) (丹扬), Chinese-born American neuroscientist

==== Japanese surnames Dan (檀, 団) ====
- Fumi Dan (檀 ふみ; born 1954), Japanese actress
- Jirō Dan (団 時朗), stage name of Hideo Murata (1949–2023), Japanese actor
- Kazuo Dan (檀 一雄; 1912–1976), Japanese novelist and poet
- Mitsu Dan (壇 蜜), stage name of Shizuka Saitō (born 1980), Japanese actress
- Rei Dan (檀 れい), stage name of Mayumi Yamazaki (born 1971), Japanese actress
- Tomoyuki Dan (檀 臣幸; 1963–2013), Japanese actor and voice actor

==== Romanian ====
- Alexandru Dan (born 1994), Romanian football midfielder
- Aurora Dan (born 1955), Romanian fencer
- Cristian Florin Dan (born 1979), Romanian football playmaker
- Călin Dan (born 1955), Romanian artist, theorist, and curator
- Dan Petrescu (b. 1967), Romanian football manager and former player
- Dan Petrescu (businessman) (1953–2021), Romanian businessman and billionaire
- Jo Jo Dan (born 1981), Romanian boxer
- Marin Dan (born 1948), Romanian handball player
- Matei-Agathon Dan (1949–2023), Romanian economist and politician
- Nicușor Dan (born 1969), Romanian activist and mathematician, first liberal president
- Pavel Dan (1907–1937), Romanian short story writer
- Sergiu Dan (1903–1976), Romanian novelist

==== Other ====
- Aubrey Dan (born 1963), Canadian businesswoman
- Bill Dan, Indonesian-born American sculptor and performance artist
- Fyodor Dan (1871–1947), Russian Marxist revolutionary
- Joseph Dan (1935–2020), Hungarian-born Israeli scholar of Jewish mysticism
- Leo Dan (1942–2025), Argentine composer and singer
- Leslie Dan (born 1929), Hungarian-born Canadian businessman
- Liran Dan (fl. 1998–present), Israeli government official and media executive
- Seaman Dan (Henry Gibson Dan, 1929–2020), Australia-Torres Straits Islander singer
- Theo Dan (born 2000), English rugby union player

== Animals ==
- Handsome Dan, mascot for Yale

== See also ==
- Daniel (disambiguation)
- Danny (disambiguation)
- Dans, given name and surname
