= Dan River =

Dan River may refer to:

- Dan River (Virginia)
- Dan River (China)
- Dan River (Middle East)

== Other ==
- Little Dan River
- Browns Dan River
- Dan Hole River

== See also ==
- Dan (disambiguation)
- Valea lui Dan River
