= Impact Teen Drivers =

- Abbreviation: Impact; ITD
- Formation: 2007
- Type: 501(c)(3)
- Headquarters: Sacramento, CA, U.S.
- Region served: U.S.
- Website: http://impactteendrivers.org http://whatdoyouconsiderlethal.com/ http://createrealimpact.com/

Impact Teen Drivers is an organization intended to help teens reduce their risk of being involved in auto collisions, particularly those caused by everyday distractions and inexperienced decision making.

== Founders ==
Impact Teen Drivers was founded in mid-2007 by the California Association of Highway Patrolmen, California Casualty Management Company, and the California Teachers Association. The Executive Board consists of CEO California Association of Highway Patrolmen Jon Hamm, Senior Vice President of California Casualty George Bowen, Executive Director California Teachers Association Carolyn Doggett, CHP Commissioner Joe Farrow, California State Superintendent Jack O'Connell, and Parent Representative Robin Reid-Anderson. Impact Teen Drivers is led by Executive Director Dr. Kelly Browning. Jon Hamm conceived the idea because of the large number of crashes involving youth that the California Highway Patrol respond to.

== Sponsors and funding ==
California Casualty is the founding sponsor. California Association of Highway Patrolmen (founding organization), California Teachers Association (founding organization), California Office of Traffic Safety, California Department of Motor Vehicles, California Highway Patrol, California Department of Education, California State PTA, and RADD The Entertainment Industry's Voice for Road Safety are sponsors. Funding and support also comes from private donations, volunteers, and other organizations.

== Activities ==
Impact Teen Drivers sends free teaching materials to high schools, driving schools, law enforcement agencies, and other interested parties. Teaching materials are also available free online. Impact Teen Drivers creates an online social network through Twitter and Facebook.

The first campaign was rolled out in May 2008 and the second was in March 2009. Fall 2009 was the start of a new campaign, "What do you consider lethal?", including the launching of the new teen-centered site of the same name. Browning was interviewed by the New York Times in August 2009 about a graphic video produced about the dangers of distracted driving and possible cell phone technology that could help prevent phone-related collisions.

Spring campaigns coincide with California Teen Safe Driving Week. Resolutions are sponsored by California State Senators and Assembly Members. Past sponsors include: Assembly Member Pedro Nava and Assembly Member Mike Feuer in April 2008, Senator Alan Lowenthal and Assembly Member Mike Eng in March 2009, and Senator Alan Lowenthal and Assembly Member Cathleen Galgiani in March 2010.

== See also ==
- National Teen Driver Safety Week (in the US)
