= Stan Dann =

American artist (1931 - 2013)

Stan F. Dann (May 23, 1931 Burnaby, British Columbia – May 8, 2013, in Lafayette, California) was a contemporary Northern California artist known for his puzzle-like bas-relief wall sculptures of polychrome wood. His earlier commercial career during the 1960s–1970s produced popular carved wooden signage, graphics and art objects.

== Early life ==
Dann grew up in Burnaby, British Columbia. He graduated in 1949 from Faulkner Smith Academy of Fine Art, Vancouver. Dann attended Art Center College of Design (then in Los Angeles) receiving a BS degree with honors in 1957. He moved to Lafayette, California, after graduation and became a United States citizen.

After briefly working as an art director at McCann-Erickson advertising agency in San Francisco, Dann formed a boutique design group, 222, with several partners in the 1960s. To call attention to the new firm, he hand-carved a redwood sign. Architects and design firms in the surrounding North Beach area took immediate notice. As the demand for his skills grew, he quit the advertising business and opened the Stan Dann Studio in Oakland, California.

Most work was one-of-a-kind wood signage, massive doors, and other architectural details commissioned by designers and architects such as Gensler and Skidmore, Owings and Merrill for civic buildings, corporations, private homes, restaurants, vineyards and department stores. The company Forms & Surfaces provided carved reproductions of his work to the larger architectural community. Dann's early wood graphics and sculptural wood objects were important elements in the design style of the roadside attraction The Nut Tree in Vacaville, California, which also featured Charles Eames furniture and Wayne Thiebaud art. Dann carved the intricate oak doors leading to the Herbert Hoover Memorial Exhibit Pavilion, Stanford University, built in 1978.

== Artistry ==
In 1981 Dann turned his focus solely to fine art and the work for which he is most known. He abandoned hand carving and used a band saw and other power tools to sculpt free-form wooden shapes. The undulating pieces were applied to a wood background in a puzzle-like manner to create large bas-relief wall sculptures. The works were finished in such a manner that they were often mistaken for ceramic.

Dann's sculpture reflected two influences from his youth. First were the wood patterns made in his brother's pattern shop that would serve as patterns for industrial machinery parts. Secondly, he grew up fascinated by the multiple layers of interlocking symbology of the monumental carved totem poles and pillars of the Pacific Northwest's indigenous peoples.

His subject matter ranged from everyday household objects and machinery to street scenes to abstract compositions. San Francisco Chronicle art critic Kenneth Baker wrote in 1989, "Objects in Dann's world hunker and lurch with a comic animal energy, as if conducting secret lives behind our backs."

Curator Carl Worth for the 1990 solo exhibition, Stan Dann: A Ten-Year Perspective, at the Walnut Creek Civic Arts Gallery, Walnut Creek, California, examined the artist's process. "… from schematic image through interlocked elements, (he) continues in his method of literally reconstructing reality." While the medium and some themes persisted throughout his career, Dann continuously redefined his style as he explored the relationship between description and abstraction. "The result is a liberation from wood construction to expressionist painting" concluded Carol Fowler, Contra Costa Times art reviewer.

In 2011 Dann's work was featured in the landmark exhibition Crafting Modernism: Mid-Century American Art and Design at the Museum of Arts and Design, New York City. He is represented in many private and institutional collections including Crocker Art Museum, Sacramento, California, The Collection of Forrest L. Merrill, Berkeley, California, The Hechinger Collection, Washington, D.C., McGraw-Hill, and McDonald Corporation. Commissions include his nine-panel sculpture for Simpson Manufacturing Company, Pleasanton, California, and bas-relief compositions for California Casualty headquarters in San Mateo, California.

During his lifetime, Dann was represented by the Allan Stone Gallery, New York City, where he had a solo exhibition, Shoes & Things, in 2000, and the Barclay Simpson Fine Arts Gallery, Lafayette, among others.

Dann was a member of The Breakfast Group founded by Elmer Bischoff and Sidney Gordin in the 1960s. Made up of Berkeley-based artists who met weekly to talk art over breakfast, the group held several group exhibitions in which Dann participated. He was also a member of the Pacific Rim Sculptors Group in Berkeley.
