= Dans =

Dans is a given name and surname. Notable people with the name include:

== Given name ==
- Dans Jansons (born 1966), Latvian freestyle skier
- Dans Ločmelis (born 2004), Latvian ice hockey player

== Surname ==
- Des Dans (1924–2014), Australian trade unionist and politician
- Paul Dans (born 1968/1969), American politician and political operative

== See also ==
- Dan (name)
