= California Highway Patrol =

State law enforcement agency in California, USA

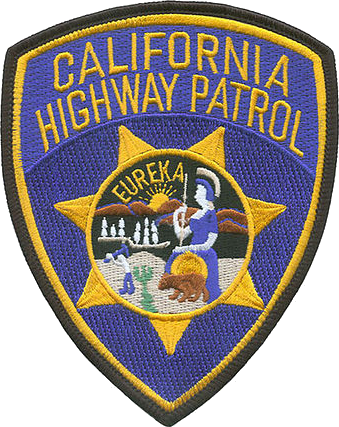
- Patch

- Door shield

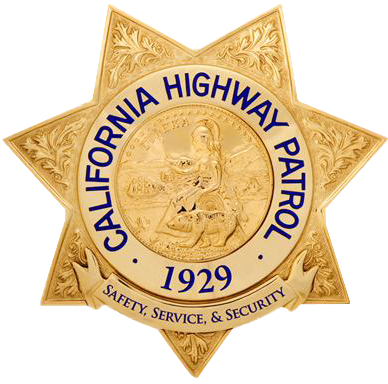
- Badge

- Flag
- Abbreviation: CHP
- Motto: Safety, Service, and Security

Agency overview
- Formed: 14 August 1929; 97 years ago
- Employees: 10,000+ (as of 2023)
- Annual budget: $3.2 billion (as of 2023)

Jurisdictional structure
- Operations jurisdiction: California, U.S.
- Map of California Highway Patrol's jurisdiction
- Area: 163,696 square miles (423,970 km^{2})
- Population: 39,613,500 (2019 est.)
- Legal jurisdiction: (California) Statewide
- Governing body: California State Legislature
- Constituting instrument: CA Vehicle Code, Division 2, Chapter 2
- General nature: Civilian police
- Specialist jurisdiction: Highways, roads, traffic

Operational structure
- Headquarters: Sacramento, California, United States
- Officers: 6,406 (authorized, as of 2023), 5,444 sworn as of December 2023
- Civilian members: 3,000+ (as of 2023)
- Commissioner responsible: Sean Duryee
- Parent agency: California State Transportation Agency (CalSTA)
- Divisions: 8

Facilities
- Stations: 16 Commercial Enforcement Facilities; 102 Area Offices
- Actual patrol cars: Ford Explorer 2016/2020; Ford Super Duty Truck; Ram Truck; Dodge Charger 2016; Chevrolet Tahoe 2015/2023
- Motorcycles: Harley Davidson Electra Glide
- Planes: Cessna 206; GippsAero GA8 Airvan
- Helicopters: Eurocopter AS350 Écureuil

Website
- chp.ca.gov

The California Highway Patrol (CHP) is the principal state police agency for the U.S. state of California. The CHP has primary jurisdiction, including patrol and investigations, over all California freeways and state property. Additionally, the CHP is responsible for the enforcement of all laws regulating the operation of vehicles on highways, including all roadways, outside incorporated city limits. The CHP can exercise law enforcement powers anywhere within the state.

The California State Legislature originally established the California Highway Patrol as a branch of the Division of Motor Vehicles in the Department of Public Works, with legislation signed by Governor C. C. Young on August 14, 1929. It was subsequently established as a separate department with legislation signed by Governor Earl Warren in 1947. The CHP gradually assumed increased responsibility beyond the enforcement of the State Vehicle Act and eventually absorbed the smaller California State Police in 1995. It is currently organized as a department under the California State Transportation Agency (CalSTA).

In addition to its highway patrol duties, the CHP also provides other services including protecting state buildings and facilities (most notably the California State Capitol) and guarding state officials. The CHP also works with municipal and federal law enforcement agencies, providing assistance in investigations, patrol and other aspects of law enforcement.

The California Highway Patrol is the largest state police agency in the United States, with 11,000 employees, over 7,600 of whom are sworn, according to a study in December 2019.

The CHP gained international recognition in the late 1970s and the early 1980s, through the broadcast of the TV series CHiPs, which chronicled the adventures of two fictional CHP motorcycle officers.

== Duties ==
The CHP is responsible for public safety and law enforcement on all freeways and expressways, throughout the state, regardless of whether the freeway is within the boundaries of an incorporated city. Additionally, the CHP is responsible for the enforcement of all laws regulating the operation of vehicles, and the use of the highways and public roads in unincorporated portions of a county. Local police or the local sheriff's department having a contract with an incorporated city are primarily responsible for investigating and enforcing traffic laws within the boundaries of an incorporated city; however, any peace officer of the CHP may enforce any state law anywhere within the state, even though the agency's primary mission is related to transportation. Furthermore, CHP officers act as bailiffs for the California Supreme Court and the six California Courts of Appeal, and also provide security at buildings occupied by the State of California.

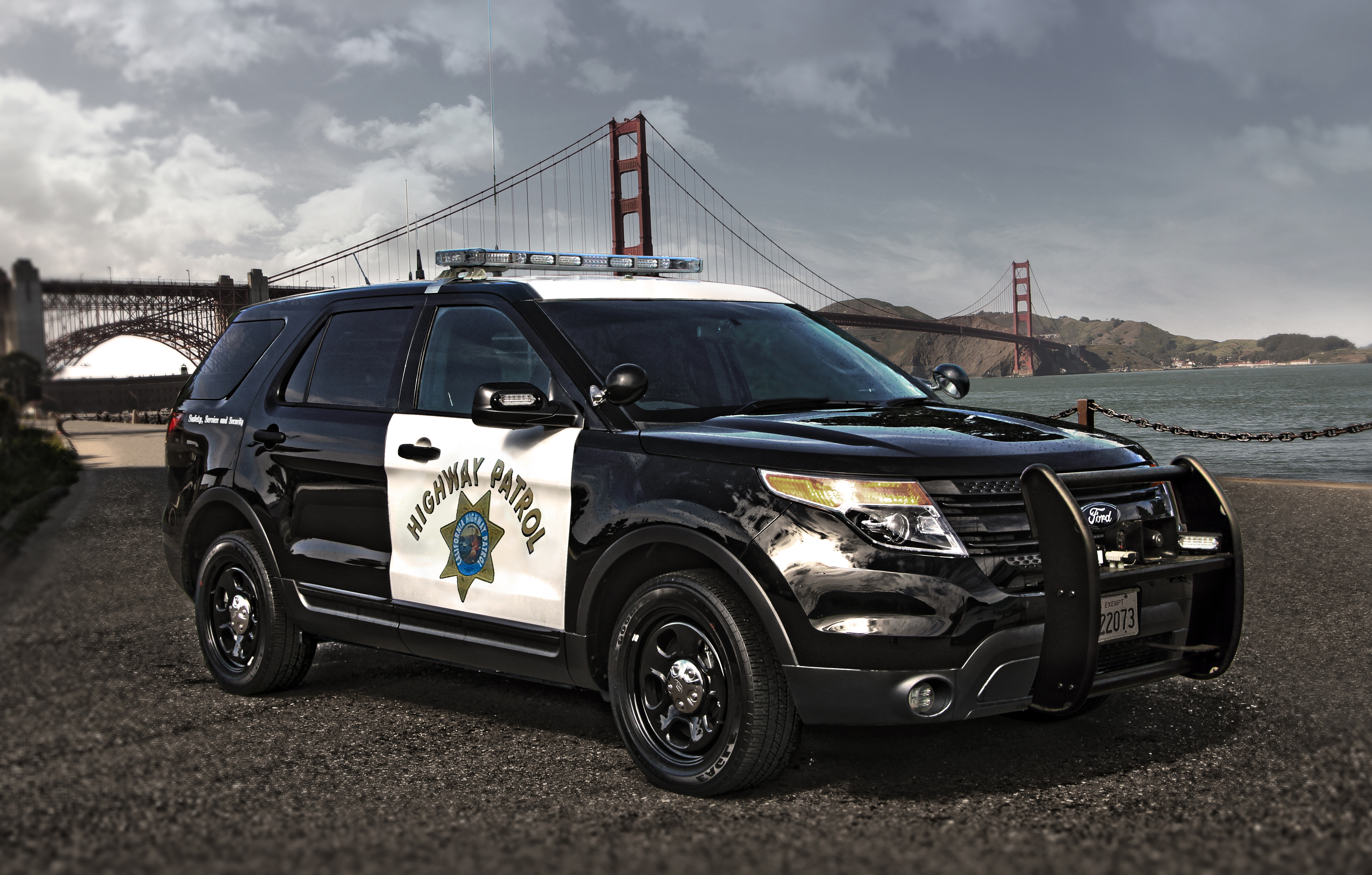
The Ford Police Interceptor Utility Vehicle replaced the Ford Crown Victoria Police Interceptor in 2013.

CHP officers enforce the California Vehicle Code, pursue fugitives spotted on the highways, and attend to all significant obstructions and crashes within their jurisdiction. CHP officers are responsible for investigating and disposing of car accidents, disabled vehicles, debris, and other impediments to the flow of traffic. They are often the first responders at the scene of an accident (or obstruction), and in turn summon paramedics, firefighters, tow truck drivers, or Caltrans personnel. The CHP files traffic crash reports for state highways and within unincorporated areas. The CHP responds to and investigates all accidents involving school buses throughout the state including incorporated cities.

CHP also has Multidisciplinary Accident Investigation Teams (MAIT) for the investigation of complex traffic crashes.

Officers patrol in various vehicles including the 2014–2021 Ford Police Interceptor Utility, 2016–2023 Dodge Charger, and in 2015 Chevrolet Tahoe. In alternate duties, Officers have been utilizing some police cars from the early 2000s such as Ford Expeditions. Mobile Road Enforcement (MRE) Officers delegated with enforcing commercial vehicles utilize the 2016 Ford F-250 and 2016–2023 Ram 1500.

== Special responsibilities ==
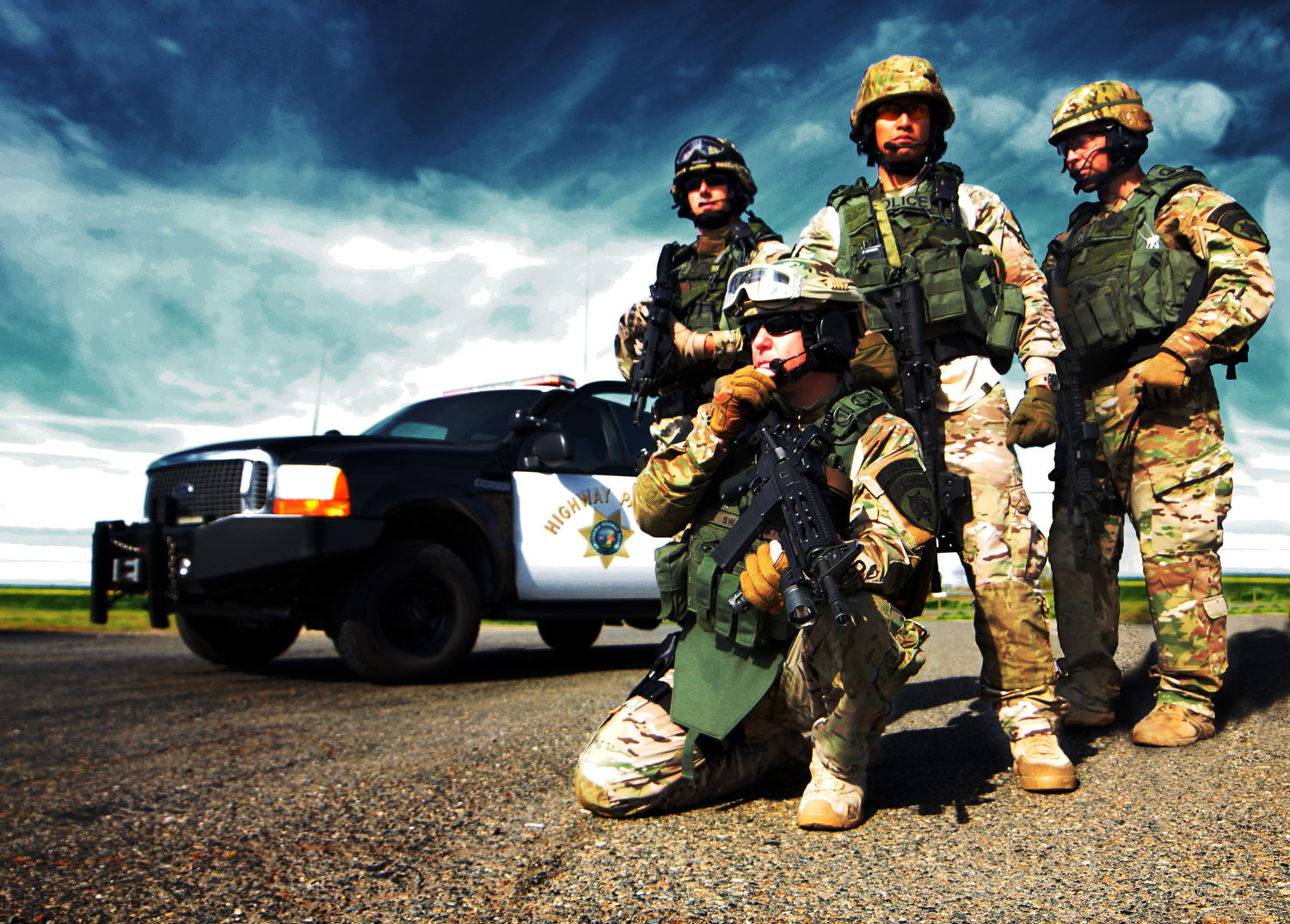
Members of the CHP SWAT Team

The CHP also publishes data on traffic accidents in California from a database called SWITRS (Statewide Integrated Traffic Records System).

After the September 11, 2001 attacks, the CHP became responsible for securing and patrolling a number of potential terrorist targets in California. These sites include nuclear power plants, government buildings, and key infrastructure sites. The CHP also maintains a SWAT team on 24‑hour stand‑by to respond to any terrorist activity.

In September 2005, the CHP sent its two Mobile Field Forces (highly trained and equipped quick reaction/deployment teams for civil disturbances and/or disasters) to the Gulf Coast to assist in the aftermath of Hurricane Katrina. Before the National Guard arrived, the CHP had four patrol helicopters over Marianna, Florida, more than eighty vehicles on the ground, and more than 200 officers and other staff, including a SWAT team, deployed in New Orleans.

The CHP also has officers assigned to drug task forces and other criminal investigative task forces throughout the state, and maintains highly trained Warrant Service Teams (WST) throughout each of its Divisions. These teams serve high-risk felony arrest and search warrants generated as a result of CHP investigations, and the WST assists local, state, and federal law enforcement agencies to serve the same type of high-risk warrants. CHP investigators also work closely with agents of the State Bureau of Investigation, Office of the Attorney General.

The CHP also has a Special Response Team (SRT) for rapidly responding to natural disasters or civil disturbances throughout the state. Specialized training and equipment help to quickly quell unrest, preserve life, prevent property damage, and ensure the safety of the public.

Additionally, the CHP has dozens of narcotic patrol and explosive detection K-9 teams stationed throughout the state.

The California Highway Patrol's additional responsibilities includes a governor protection detail.

Somewhat controversially, the cities of Oakland and Stockton have contracted with the California Highway Patrol to assist their police departments with local patrol duties, including traffic stops and responding to 911 calls.

== Pay and pensions ==
Average officer pay was $118,000 in 2014. By law, salaries are set by an average of the five largest police departments in the state. In 2012, the top paid CHP officer received $483,581, 44 other officers earning over $200,000, and over 5,000 officers receiving over $100,000. In 2011, CHP officers earned $82.4 million in overtime, triple the amount in the second largest state, and with one officer earning over $93,000 in overtime alone. Officers are strictly prohibited from working more than 16.5 hours at a time before having to take a minimum eight-hour break.

In 1999, Governor Gray Davis signed SB 400, which allowed CHP officers to retire at age 50 and continue receiving as much as 90% of their peak pay as a pension. This raised the pension earned for 30 years of service from an average of $62,218 to $96,270. Officers' average retirement age is 54. New officers have a retirement age of 57 in accordance with CalPers 2.7% at 57 formula. As of 2019, a new contract was negotiated with the state, causing officers to increase their contribution to the retirement plan by deferring any percentage over 3% of their annual raise towards their pension. This brings their contribution closer to a 50–50 split with the state, while boosting state contributions toward the officers' retirements from other sources.

== Organization and accreditation ==
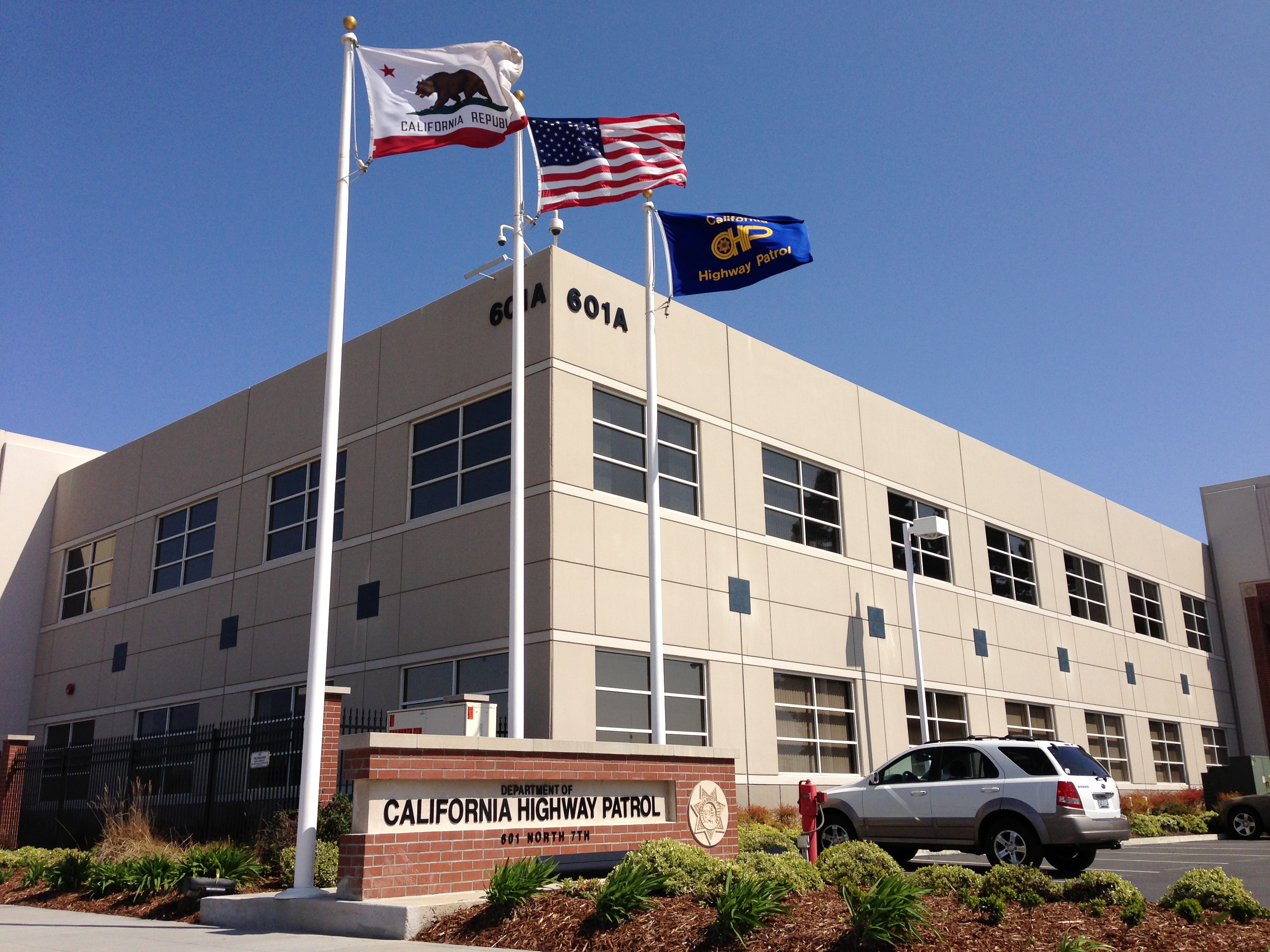
California Highway Patrol Headquarters in Sacramento

The CHP is led by the Commissioner, who is appointed by the Governor of California. The Deputy Commissioner is also appointed by the Governor and the Assistant Commissioners are appointed by the Commissioner.

On February 3, 2023, Acting Commissioner Duryee was appointed to Commissioner by Governor Gavin Newsom.

=== Hierarchy ===
- Commissioner of the Highway Patrol — Sean A. Duryee
  - Office of Employee Relations
  - Deputy Commissioner of the Highway Patrol — Ezery O. Beauchamp
    - Office of Inspector General
    - Office of Community Outreach & Media Relations
    - Office of Legal Affairs
    - Office of Internal Affairs
    - Office of Risk Management
    - Office of Equal Employment Opportunity
    - Assistant Commissioner, Field Operations — Rodney D. Ellison II
      - Northern Division
      - Valley Division
      - Golden Gate Division
      - Central Division
      - Southern Division
      - Border Division
      - Coastal Division
      - Inland Division
      - Office of Air Operations
      - Protective Services Division
        - Capitol Protection Section
        - Dignitary Protection Section
        - Judicial Protection Section
    - Assistant Commissioner, Staff Operations — Robin M. Johnson
      - Administrative Services Division
      - Enforcement and Planning Division
      - Information Management Division
      - Office of Employee Safety and Assistance
      - Personnel and Training Division

In 2010 the CHP received initial accreditation by the Commission on Accreditation for Law Enforcement Agencies (CALEA). Upon receiving this honor, the CHP became the largest CALEA-accredited law enforcement agency in the nation.

On November 16, 2013, the CHP Academy was formally recognized as an accredited Public Safety Training Academy by CALEA, becoming the first accredited state police training academy in the nation. Additionally, the department succeeded in its bid for Advanced Law Enforcement reaccreditation, and remains the largest accredited law enforcement agency in the nation.

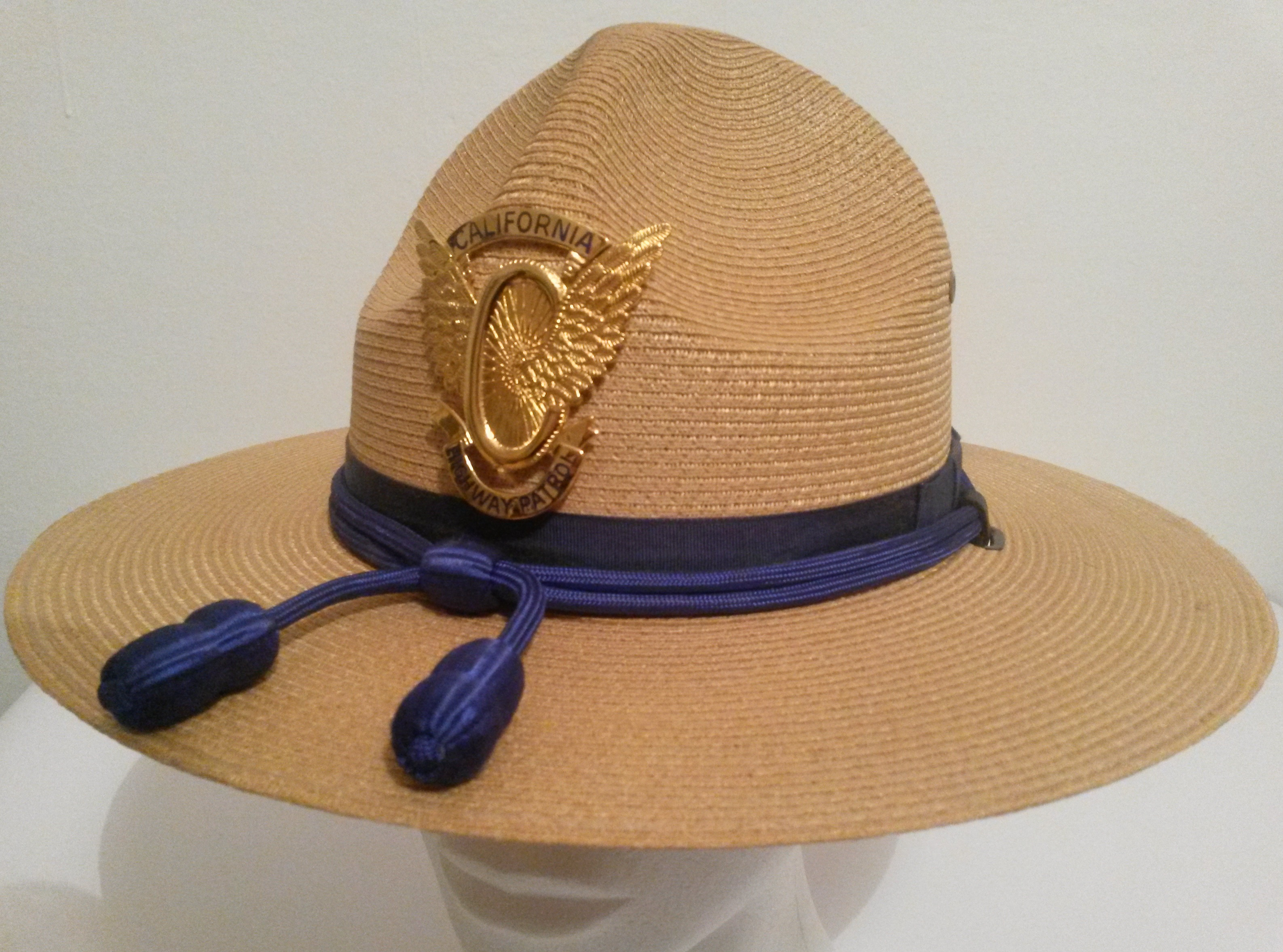
California Highway Patrol campaign hat

On November 22, 2014, the CHP communications centers were formally accredited by CALEA under the Public Safety Communications Agencies Accreditation Program. Having received this honor, the CHP became the first accredited state highway patrol in the nation to receive communications accreditation.

Having received accreditation status for its communications centers, the CHP became one of only two agencies in California to receive the CALEA TRI-ARC award, which is given to agencies having concurrent CALEA accreditation for their law enforcement, public safety communications and public safety training Academy. The CHP is one of nearly 20 agencies to have received this award.

== Rank structure ==
Title of the Rank	Insignia	Description of Insignia
Commissioner	OR	5 golden stars in a circle OR 5 golden stars
Deputy Commissioner		4 golden stars
Assistant Commissioner		3 golden stars
Chief		2 golden stars
Assistant Chief		1 golden star
Captain		2 gold bars
Lieutenant		1 gold bar
Sergeant		3 chevrons
Officer	No Insignia	
Cadet	No Insignia	

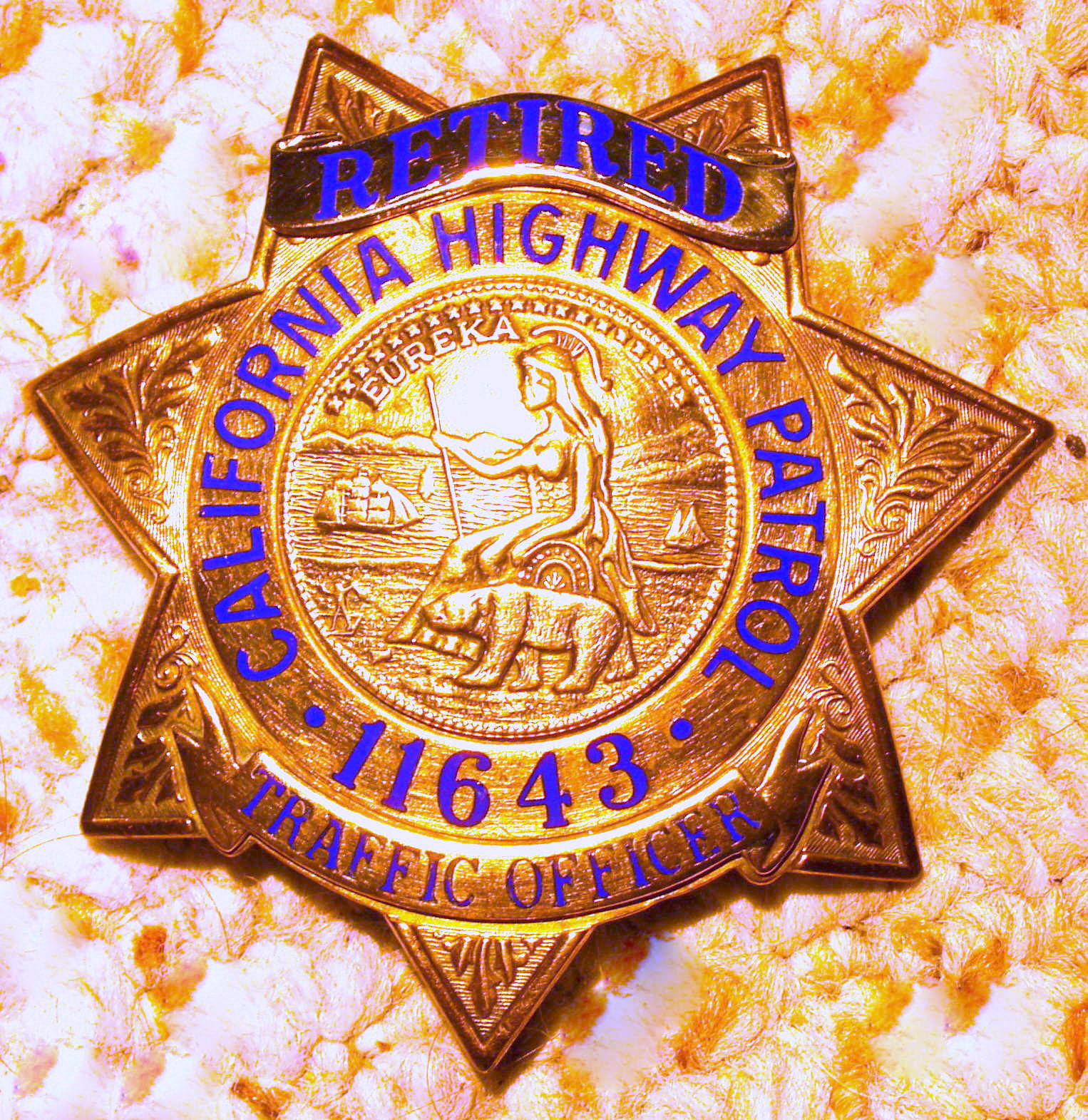
CHP badge; this is for retired officer #11643. Active duty badges are exactly the same, with the "Retired" banner not applied.

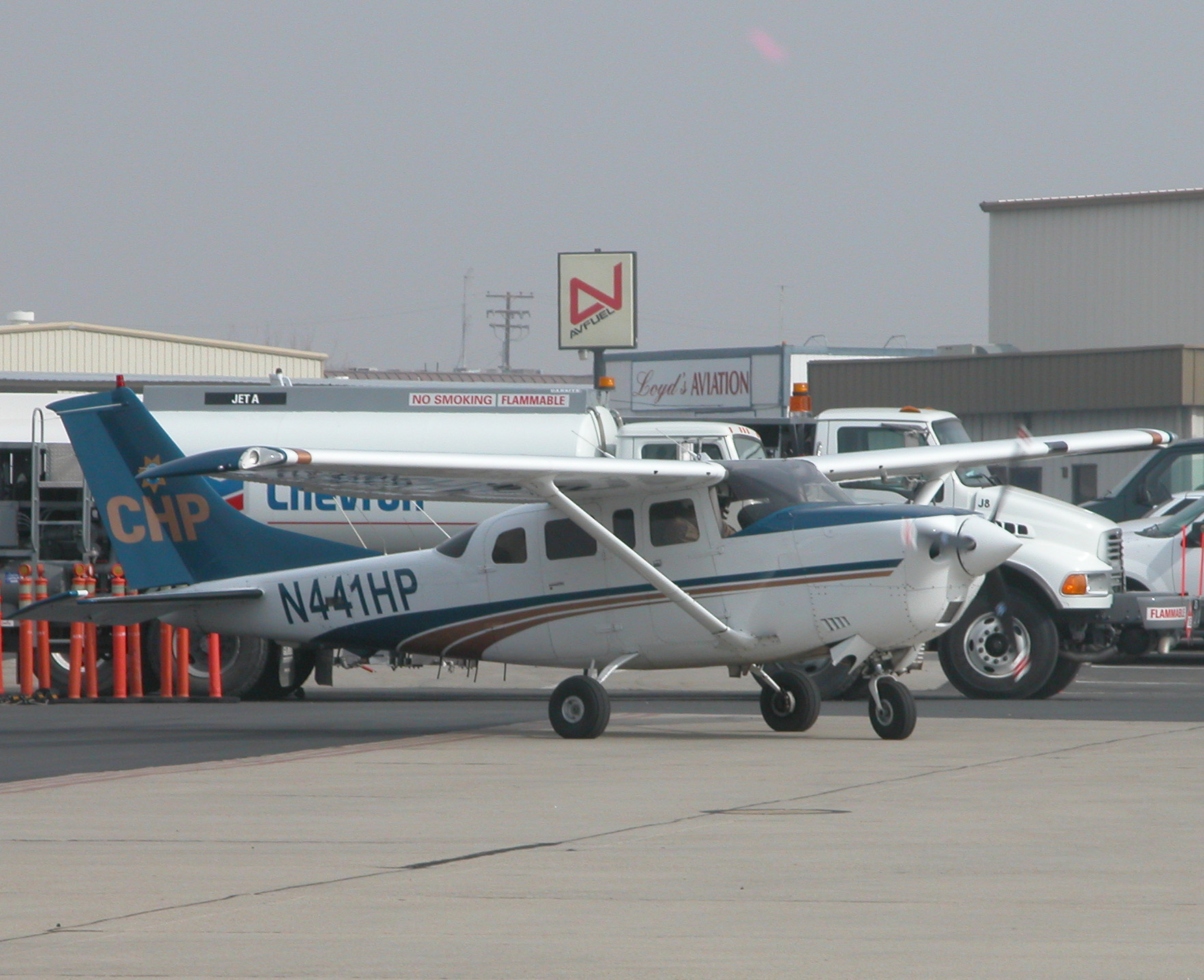
A CHP Cessna 206 prepares to depart Meadows Field Airport, Bakersfield

== Fallen officers ==
Since its inception in 1929, 233 officers have died in the line of duty. The top three frequent causes of line of duty deaths to date are (in order of cause): Automobile/Motorcycle Accidents, Gunfire, and Vehicular Assault (i.e., struck by drunk driver, reckless driving, or hearing and/or visually impaired drivers). 1964 was the deadliest year, in which eight officers died in the line of duty; 1970 and 1978 were the second deadliest years, in which seven officers died in the line of duty.

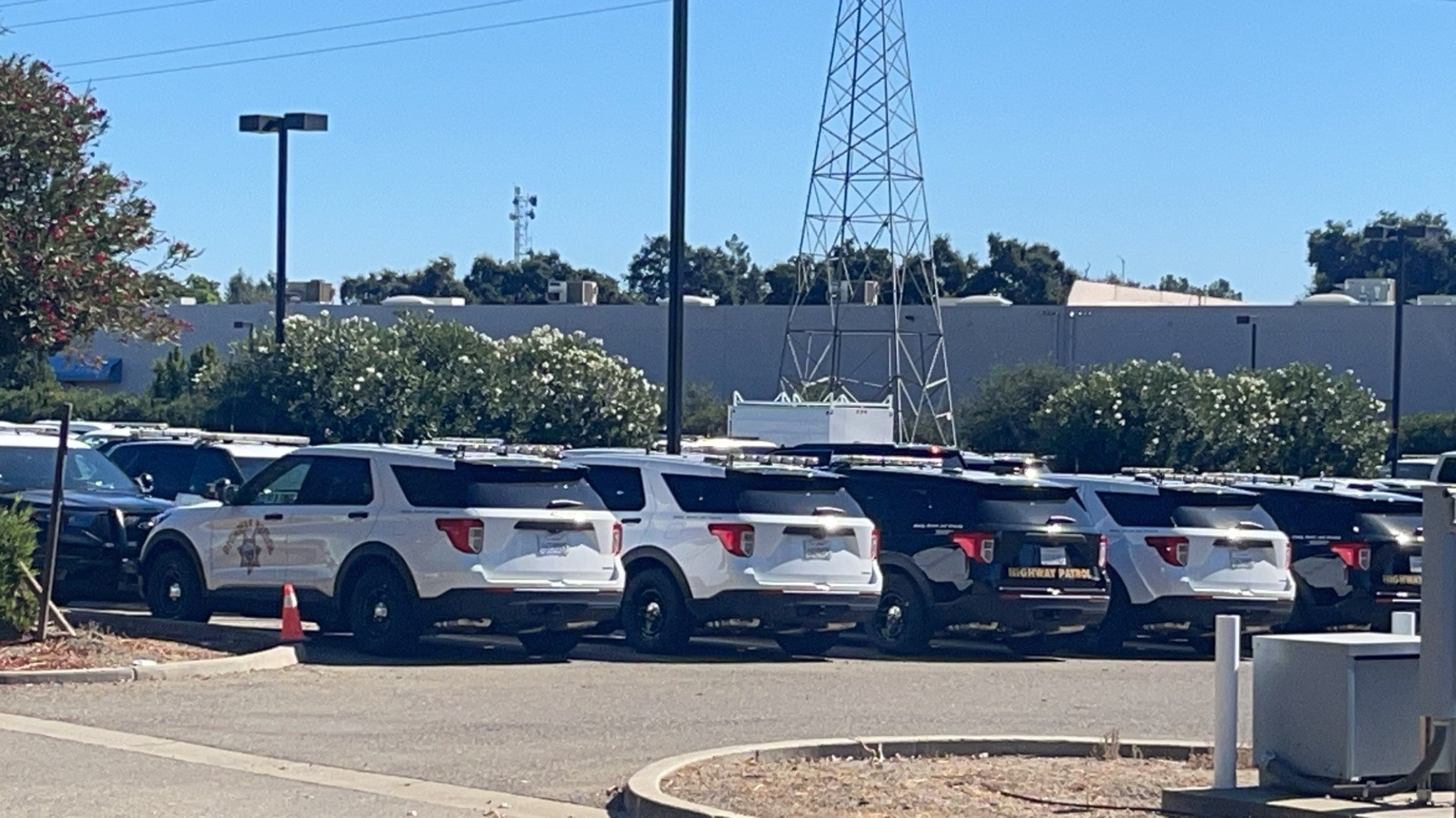
A fresh group of 2020 Generation California Highway Patrol FPIU's sit idle at the academy's Fleet Operations Section in West Sacramento waiting to be delivered to their new respective homes.

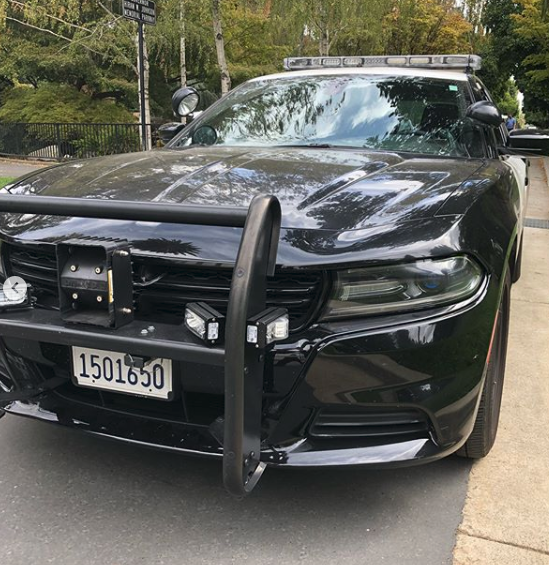
A CHP Dodge Charger at the Sacramento Capitol Building

== Mexico Liaison Unit ==
The Mexico Liaison Unit is a Border Division Unit based in San Diego. Since the CHP has no direct jurisdiction in Mexico, officers from the Unit work closely with Mexican authorities to recover and find stolen vehicles and assist with other law enforcement issues. The purpose of the "Mexico Liaison Unit" is to develop and maintain positive working relations with Mexican authorities in order to:

- Locate and identify stolen U.S. vehicles taken to Mexico
- Identify vehicle thieves and ensure their prosecution, either in Mexico or California
- Provide assistance to Mexican and U.S. authorities

The unit was originally established in 1958 and consisted of only one officer. It was discontinued in the 1970s, and reestablished in 1980. The unit now consists of one sergeant and six officers, all of whom are fluent in Spanish.

== Newhall Incident ==
On April 6, 1970, four California Highway Patrol officers were killed in a 4 1/2‑minute shootout in the Newhall region of Southern California. The incident is a landmark in CHP history because of both its emotional impact and the procedural and doctrinal reforms implemented by the CHP in the incident's aftermath.

The shootout occurred in a restaurant parking lot just before midnight. Officers Walt Frago and Roger Gore were alerted by radio of a vehicle carrying someone who brandished a weapon. They spotted the car, fell in behind, called for backup, and began the stop procedure. When the suspects' vehicle came to a halt in the parking lot, the driver was instructed to step out of the vehicle and spread his hands on the hood. Gore approached him and Frago moved to the passenger side. The passenger side door suddenly swung open and the passenger sprung out, firing at Frago, who fell with two shots in his chest. The gunman, later identified as Jack Twinning, then turned and fired once at Gore, who returned fire. In that moment the driver, Bobby Davis, turned and shot Gore twice at close range. Both officers died instantly.

When Officers James Pence and George Alleyn drove in moments later, they could not see suspects or other officers, but both immediately came under fire. Officer Pence put out an 11‑99 call ("officer in distress") then took cover behind the passenger door. Alleyn grabbed his shotgun, and positioned himself behind the driver-side door. Both officers were mortally wounded in the ensuing exchange, and one suspect was hit.

Suspects Jack Twinning and Bobby Davis escaped, later abandoned their vehicle and then split up. For nine hours, officers blanketed the area searching for the killers. Twinning broke into a house and briefly held a man hostage. Officers used tear gas before storming the house, but Twinning committed suicide with the shotgun he stole from Frago. Davis was captured, stood trial and convicted on four counts of murder. He was sentenced to death, but in 1972, the California Supreme Court declared the death penalty to be cruel and unusual punishment and in 1973, the court commuted his sentence to life in prison.

Of the incident, Ronald Reagan, who was governor of California at the time, said the following: "If anything worthwhile comes of this tragedy, it should be the realization by every citizen that often the only thing that stands between them and losing everything they hold dear ... is the man wearing a badge."

A follow-up investigation eventually led to a complete revision of procedures during high-risk and felony stops. Firearms procedures have also changed fundamentally due to this incident, and physical methods of arrest have been improved. The police baton and pepper spray have been added to the officer's arsenal, with more in‑depth training in their use.

The 25th anniversary of the Newhall Incident was observed on April 6, 1995, at the present Newhall Area office, where a brick memorial pays tribute to Officers George Alleyn (6290), Walt Frago (6520), Roger Gore (6547) and James Pence (6885). The memorial once stood at the former Newhall office, but was rebuilt at the new site, about one mile (1.6 km) from the scene of the slayings.

== Mergers ==
On July 12, 1995, the California State Police, which was a separate agency, was absorbed into the CHP, thus greatly expanding the agency's mandate. In addition to safety on the state highway system, it is now responsible for the safety of all elected state officials and all people who work in or are utilizing a state building in California, such as the State Capitol Building in Sacramento.

It has also been discussed to merge the Law Enforcement Division of the California Department of Fish and Wildlife into the California Highway Patrol. By doing so, this may allow for better protection of California's environment and natural resources. The underfunded CDFW Law Enforcement Division has faced low numbers of Game Wardens also known as Wildlife Officers for the last ten years; a similar idea is already in place in Oregon and Alaska, where the Oregon State Police and Alaska State Troopers serve as game wardens under a separate fish and wildlife division within the two departments.

== Firearms ==
The California Highway Patrol currently issues the Smith & Wesson M&P pistol chambered in .40 S&W, replacing the Smith & Wesson Model 4006 TSW.

On Thursday the 7th of May 2026, Smith and Wesson announced via their Instagram that The California Highway Patrol had selected the M&P9 M2.0 to replace the M&P40.

== Vehicles ==
=== Origins ===
When motor vehicles in California were first seen as needing legislation, law enforcement agencies began to patrol using motorcycles, cars and trucks. Motorcycle officers in 1920 Fresno, started a group to assist each other and promote road safety – the Joaquin Valley Traffic Officer's Association – led by Harry Wilson who they elected as president. They renamed themselves the California Association of Highway Patrolmen in 1921, and became the California Highway Patrol in 1927 under the auspices of the Department of Motor Vehicles.

=== Motorcycles ===
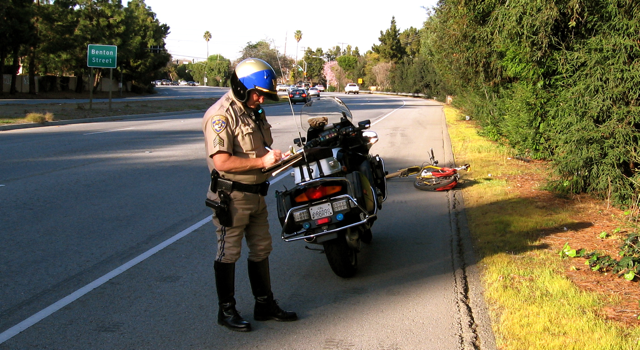
A motorcycle sergeant on the San Tomas Expressway near Benton Avenue in Santa Clara

As of 2023, CHP had transitioned to BMW motorcycles with the BMW R1250RT-P to replace the aging fleet of Harley-Davidsons.

Through the public competitive bidding process, the Harley-Davidson Electraglide motorcycle was selected as the primary enforcement motorcycle for the California Highway Patrol in 2013.

These replacement enforcement motorcycles will replenish the department's aging motorcycle fleet. In a cost-saving move, the CHP previously deferred the purchase of replacement motorcycles and has not purchased enforcement motorcycles since January 14, 2011. As a result, approximately 20 percent of the current fleet has logged 100,000 plus miles – well exceeding the manufacturer's warranty.

CHP's motorcycle program enhances public safety. Motorcycle officers are able to effectively enforce traffic laws in areas in which enforcement by four-wheel vehicles is impractical. Motorcycles can access scenes of accidents and natural disasters more quickly and work commute traffic in way that is unique to the motorcycle. Additionally, motorcycles play a special role in dignitary protection.

The CHP has approximately 415 enforcement motorcycles working the roads throughout California. The CHP purchased 121 of the Harley-Davidson enforcement motorcycles to replace motorcycles that have high mileage or have been damaged in traffic collisions. As of June 2013, approximately 22 percent of the CHP's motorcycle fleet is over 100,000 miles with more than half of those over 125,000 miles. On average, a CHP enforcement motorcycle is driven 14,000 miles per year.

Early motorcycles used included Indian, Harley-Davidson and Henderson manufactured bikes during the 1920s and 30s; though by 1941, the main manufacturers used at the training academy were Harley-Davidson and Indian.

In 1998, CHP began using the BMW R1100RT-P, with features including a helmet interface for communications, two batteries, and a top speed of 130 miles per hour (210 km/h).

=== Patrol cars ===
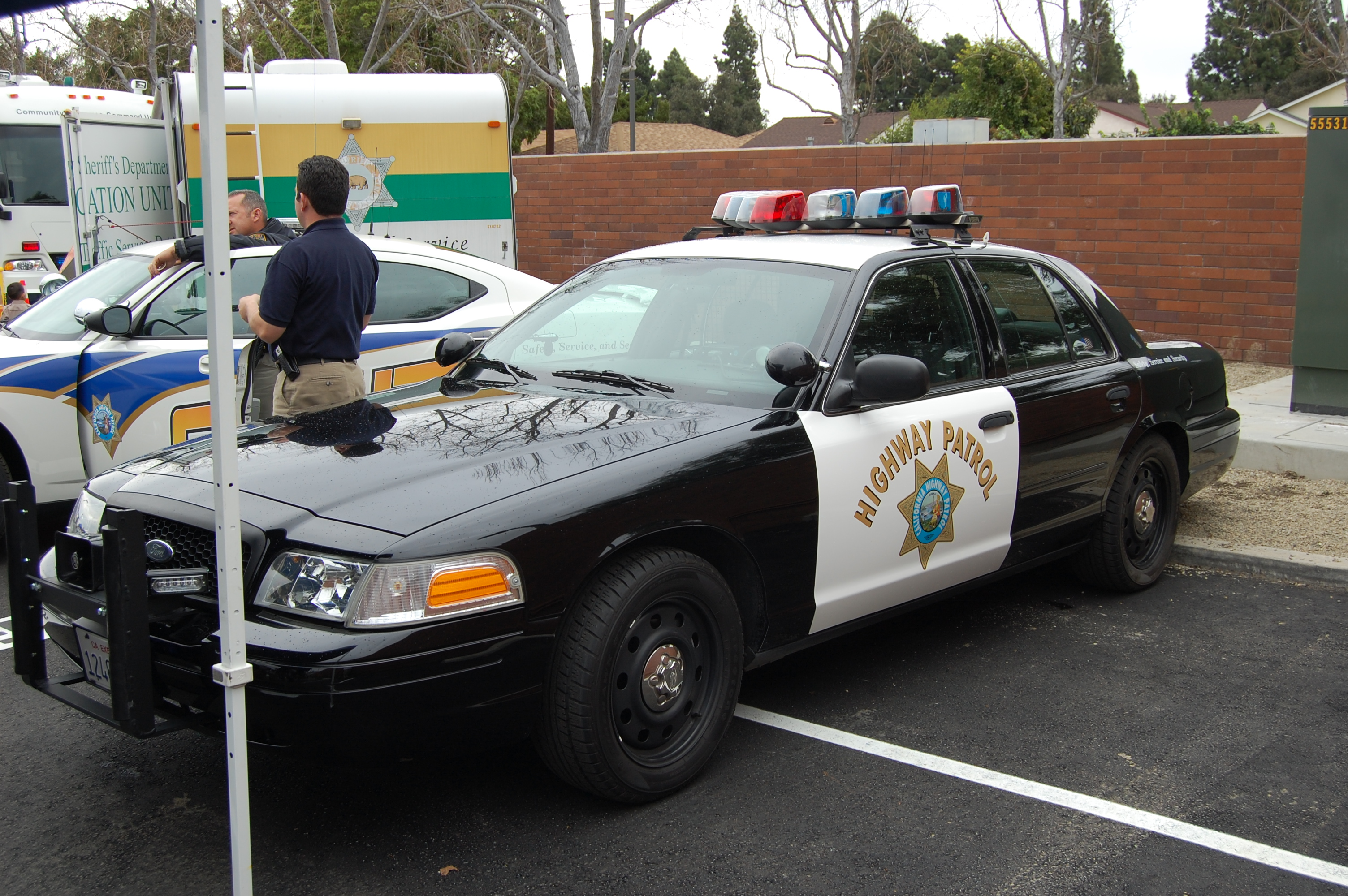
California Highway Patrol cruiser on display at Public Safety Day in Lakewood

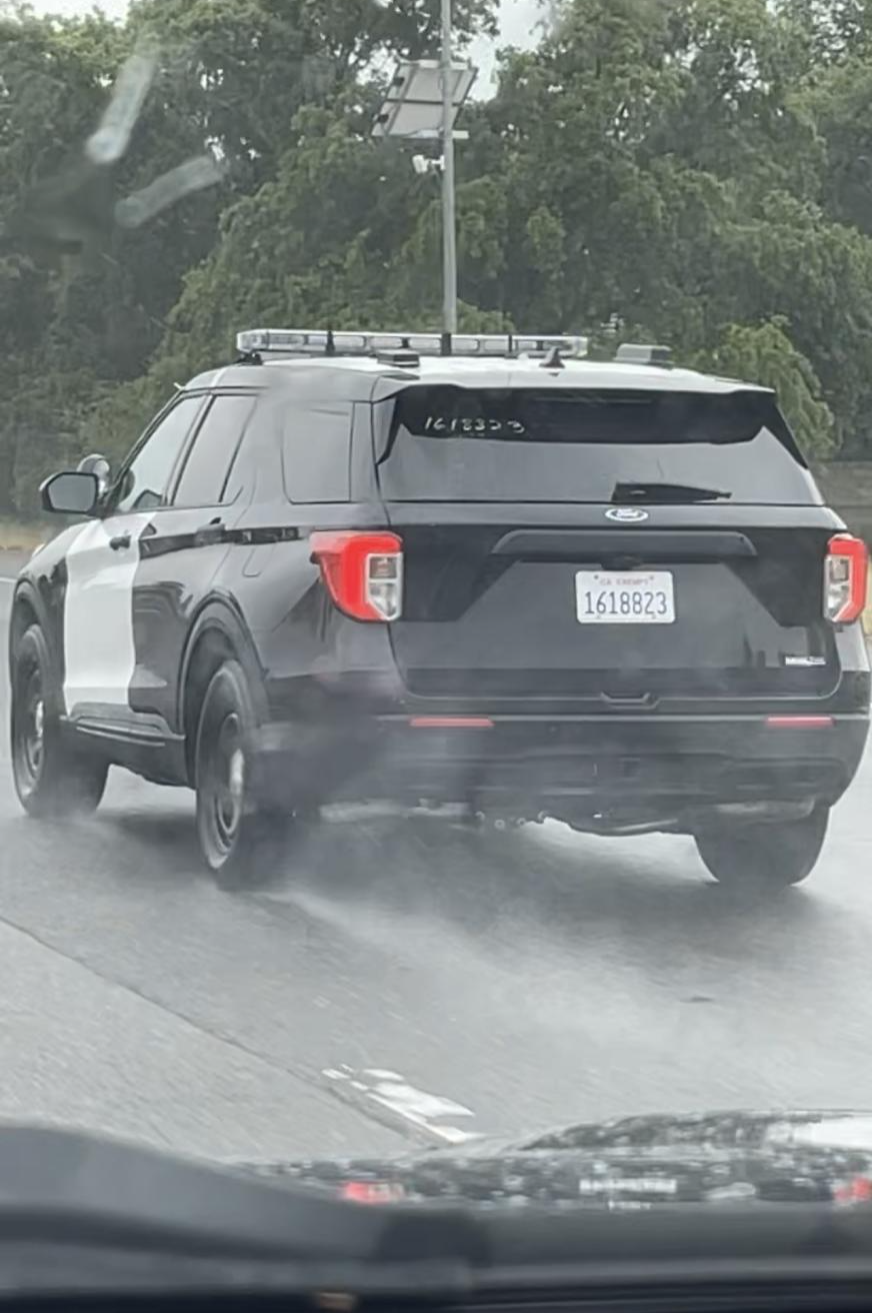
An Experimental California Highway Patrol 2021 Interceptor Utility on Interstate 80 in Roseville.

The Department of General Services is responsible for selecting a vehicle based on price, performance and payload capacity for the CHP. The bid specifications require a pursuit-rated, rear-wheel drive or all-wheel drive that can carry at least 1,500 pounds, the approximate weight of four officers, their equipment, and the police vehicle equipment.

The Ford Crown Victoria Police Interceptor averaged 14 mpg city and 21 mpg highway. The new Ford Police Interceptor Utility Vehicle costs $26,578, which includes a 5-year, 100,000-mile warranty. The department was paying $24,043 for the Ford Crown Victoria Police Interceptors and recently spent hundreds of thousands of dollars per month to maintain all vehicles no longer covered by warranty. Several vehicles were allocated to public affairs officers and are used for recruiting purposes. An example of these vehicles can be seen at the California State Fair and other venues. The last Crown Victoria's were retired in September 2020.

CHP also uses the Ford F-250, RAM 2500, and Chevrolet Silverado 1500 (still in testing) for commercial vehicle enforcement.

In July 2016, it was announced that the CHP would be taking delivery of 516 2016 Dodge Charger Pursuits equipped with the 3.6L Pentastar V6 in RWD configuration. These cars were hoped to be more reliable than the Ford Police Interceptor Utility, which have been plagued with various recalls and breakdowns, the most notable breakdowns being transmission and PTU (transfer case) failures.

In 2017, it was announced that the CHP were going to start using Chevrolet Tahoe Police Pursuit Vehicles (PPV) for rural and resident posts, along with areas that see snowfall in the winter months. This is because of their ability to carry a larger "basic load" of normal issue equipment, equipment that may be only in a few cars, and/or not carried in patrol cars at all, in a more urban setting, along with the selectable 4 wheel drive system to allow better performance in the snow.

In 2022, CHP began rolling out an all wheel drive version of the 2020 Charger Pursuit. These, like their predecessor, are powered by the naturally aspirated 3.6L Pentastar V6 engine, making 292bhp and 260lb/ft of torque. In 2025, CHP Fleet Operations rolled out a limited number of 2020 Charger Pursuit in 5.7L Hemi V8 in a rear-wheel drive configuration, making 370bhp and 395lb/ft of torque, outfitted with license plate readers (LPRs), to deplete the remaining stock of Chargers.

As of 2023 the California Highway Patrol has officially rolled out its 299 2020 Ford Police Interceptor Utility after a 3-year hold due to an issue involving the RF interference from the headlights to the department's VHF-Lowband radios. These vehicles are powered by the naturally aspirated flex fuel 3.3L V6, making 285bhp and 260lb/ft of torque.

During 2023, the average mileage of its in-service primary patrol vehicles ranged anywhere from 150,000 miles to nearly 400,000 miles, proving the 2013-2019 Year Interceptor Utilities nearly or just as capable as the previous Ford Crown Victoria Police Interceptors.

It was also reported in 2023 that the CHP is testing the latest generation Dodge Durango special service package, and has selected the 2020 Chevrolet Tahoe PPV to be upfitted and utilized after completing the latest batch of Dodge Chargers.

In 2024 the California Highway Patrol Fleet Operations rolled out 400 2024 Dodge Durangos with 5.7L Hemi V8 engines in all wheel drive configuration, making 360bhp and 390lb/ft of torque. All of these Durangos are outfitted with “360-degree concealed” lighting systems, making them harder to detect until their lights turn on.

As it stands, the highest mileage vehicle that was used by the California Highway Patrol was a 2013 Ford Explorer PIU, with an odometer at 384,857 miles upon retirement, which had patrolled the California/Nevada Border in Needles.

==== Aircraft ====
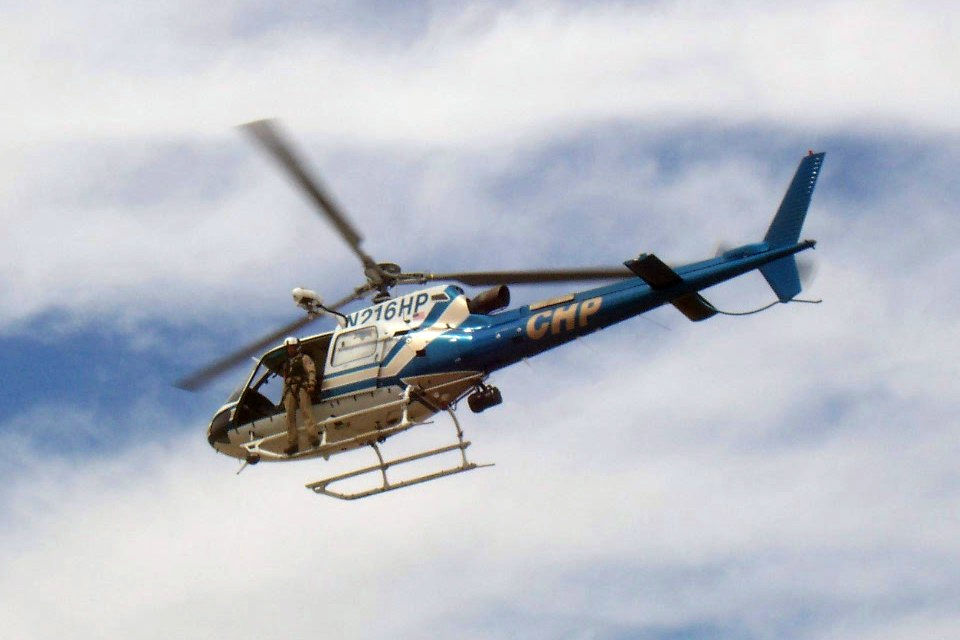
CHP AS 350 B3 in flight

The CHP utilizes both helicopters and fixed-wing aircraft. As of October 2020, the fleet consisted of:

- 15 Airbus Helicopters (Eurocopter) AS350B3 Squirrels
- 8 Cessna T206H Turbo Stationairs
- 7 Gippsaero GA8 TC-320 Airvans
- 1 Raytheon (Beechcraft) B300 Super King Air
- 1 Cessna 208B Grand Caraven EX

== Notable incidents ==
=== George Gwaltney ===
George Michael Gwaltney, a former officer from Barstow, was convicted on May 10, 1984, in federal court for the on-duty rape and murder of 23-year-old Robin Bishop on January 11, 1982. He had reported finding a dead body off a deserted stretch of Interstate 15 the same day he murdered her with his service weapon. Gwaltney was tried twice for this murder at the San Bernardino County Court House. The first trial ended with the jury deadlocked 8–4 and the second 7–5. The district attorney attempted to try Gwaltney a third time, but a Superior Court judge dismissed the murder charge.

Since Gwaltney was not convicted in the first two state trials, the FBI took over the case. The FBI was able to piece together the events leading up to the on-duty rape and murder of Robin Bishop and interrogating Gwaltney's alibi, Preston Olson and his mother. There was more forensic evidence that the FBI succeeded in getting to build their case against Gwaltney: soon his story started to fall apart. After the six-month investigation by the FBI, Gwaltney was arrested in Barstow and tried at the US District Court in Los Angeles.

He was represented by a public defender who chose not to have Gwaltney testify as he had done in the previous two state trials. He was found guilty of the murder, rape and the deprivation of Robin Bishop's civil rights while on duty. He was the first California Highway Patrol officer to be charged with the indictment of violating the civil rights of Robin Bishop as well as being the first CHP officer known to commit a murder while on duty. Following the convictions, Gwaltney was sentenced to 90 years in prison, with eligiblity for parole after 30 years: he died in federal custody in 1997 of a heart attack.

=== Craig Peyer ===
Craig Peyer, a former officer from Poway, is serving a twenty-five year to life prison sentence for the on-duty strangulation and murder of 20-year-old Cara Knott on December 27, 1986. After she was killed, Knott's body was discarded over an abandoned highway bridge. Peyer was convicted of first-degree murder in 1988. Though he has maintained innocence ever since, Peyer has been denied parole consistently. In 2004, the parole board offered Peyer the chance to prove his alleged innocence by providing a DNA sample to compare against a drop of blood found on Cara's shoe, using modern DNA profiling. Peyer declined to provide a sample, nor explained why he declined to do so.

=== Pictures ===
In 2006, two officers forwarded photos taken of Nikki Catsouras, a teenager who died in a motor vehicle accident, to colleagues without authorization. These photos quickly spread on the internet. The family sued and reached a settlement in the case with CHP for $2.37 million in 2012.

== Programs ==
The CHP hosts or partners with numerous programs for public safety education and community involvement.

Its youth programs include:

- Every 15 Minutes – a two-day anti-drunk driving presentation for high school students
- Impact Teen Drivers – a nonprofit against teen distracted driving that is partnered with the CHP
- Red Ribbon Week – a week in October dedicated to education about the dangers of illicit drugs for students of all ages

== Origins of the name ==
When the CHP was formed, there were discussions as to what to call this new agency. The consensus was for the name "California Highway Patrol". The American Automobile Association (AAA) is a private organization which provided, among other things, roadside assistance to their members. At that time, the AAA had a fleet of trucks which patrolled the roads so they could assist their members. These trucks carried a sign which said "Highway Patrol". The CHP organizers decided it would be best to contact the AAA to see if they would object to the state using this name. The AAA considered the idea, and gave their consent.

== In popular culture ==
Jack Holt played the titular hero, a rookie CHP officer, in the 1936 film Crash Donovan.

CHP personnel acted as technical advisors to the 1950s TV show Highway Patrol.

"Roadblock" was a presentation of the anthology TV series Studio 57, in which Mike Connors played a CHP motorcycle officer trying to track down a gang of armed robbers. Meant as a pilot, it never became a series. The script was based on John D. MacDonald's short story "The Homesick Buick," which was originally published in Ellery Queen's Mystery Magazine.

The CHP gained international recognition in the late 1970s to the early 1980s through the broadcast of the TV series CHiPs, which chronicled the adventures of two fictional CHP motorcycle officers. "Chippy" is sometimes used in California English as a colloquialism for officers, analogous to "State-y" elsewhere.

Retired CHP Assistant Chief Kevin Mince, writing as "K.T. Mince", has written three novels featuring Erin "Red" Wolff, a lesbian CHP officer, who rises from sergeant to captain in the course of the trilogy. The three books are Red Wolff, 95-L, and 34-C.

== See also ==
- CHiPs
- Highway patrol
- List of law enforcement agencies in California
