= Dan, West Virginia =

Unincorporated community in West Virginia, United States

Dan
- Unincorporated community
- Location within the state of West Virginia Dan (the United States)
- Coordinates: 37°21′16″N 81°48′0″W
- Country: United States
- State: West Virginia
- County: McDowell
- Elevation: 1,201 ft (366 m)
- Time zone: UTC-5 (Eastern (EST))
  - Summer (DST): UTC-4 (EDT)
- GNIS ID: 1689230

Dan is an unincorporated community in McDowell County, West Virginia, United States.
