= Gordon Dann =

Australian rules footballer

Personal information
- Full name: Gordon Dann
- Born: 2 August 1944 (age 82)
- Height: 175 cm (5 ft 9 in)
- Weight: 80 kg (176 lb)

Playing career^{1}
Years	Club	Games (Goals)
1962	South Melbourne	2 (0)
- ^{1} Playing statistics correct to the end of 1962.

Gordon Dann (born 2 August 1944) is a former Australian rules footballer who played with South Melbourne in the Victorian Football League (VFL).
