= Christian Adam Dann =

German Lutheran pastor and animal welfare writer (1758–1837)

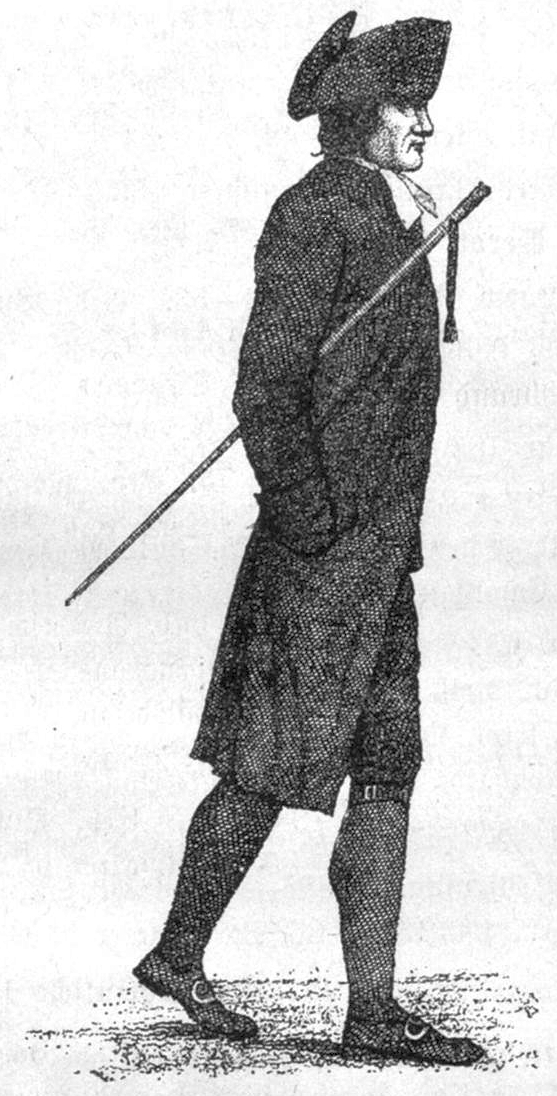
- Born: 24 December 1758; Tübingen
- Died: 19 March 1837 (aged 78); Stuttgart
- Occupations: Lutheran pastor; theologian; animal welfare writer

Christian Adam Dann (24 December 1758 – 19 March 1837) was a German Lutheran pastor, theologian, animal welfare writer and supporter of Pietism.

== Biography ==
Dann was born on 24 December 1758 in Tübingen. His father Jakob Heinrich was mayor in Tübingen, court judge and member of the state parliament. After his childhood in Tübingen, he attended the Blaubeuren monastery school as a student and joined the Theological Abbey of Tübingen in 1777, where he became a student of Gottlob Christian Storr. He then worked for two years as a preceptor vicar in Bebenhausen and five years as a repeater at the Tübingen Abbey before he took his first job as a deacon in Goppingen in 1793. From 1794 he worked as a deacon in the Stuttgart.

On the occasion of a funeral speech at the grave of the Stuttgart actor and comedian Carl Friderich Weberling (1769–1812), he criticized morality and theatre life in the city so violently in 1812 that King Friedrich I transferred him to the village of Öschingen near Tübingen after he rejected it he had to take over the dean's office in Weinsberg. He then moved to Mössingen in 1819 before King Wilhelm I brought him back to Stuttgart in 1824. After his return, he was the first deacon at the collegiate church and from 1825 until his death he was a pastor in Stuttgart's Leonhardskirche. A sermon he gave in 1830 influenced Charlotte Reihlen the future founder of the Stuttgart Deaconess Institute so much that she converted to Pietism.

Dann died at the age of 78 on 19 March 1837 in Stuttgart. He was buried in Department 5 at the Fangelsbachfriedhof in Stuttgart.

== Animal welfare ==
Dann was one of the earliest Pietists to write about animal welfare. He authored two books (1822, 1832) defending the welfare of animals from a Christian framework. Dann influenced Albert Knapp who founded the first German society for animal welfare in 1837. In Germany, Dann is known as the "Father of the German Tierschutzbewegung" (Father of the German animal welfare movement).

== Selected publications ==
- Bitte der armen Thiere, der unvernünftigen Geschöpfe, an ihre vernünftigen Mitgeschöpfe und Herrn, die Menschen. Fues, Tübingen 1822 (2nd edition 1838). [Plea of the poor animals, the unreasonable creatures, to their sensible fellow creatures and lords, the people]
- Nothgedrungener, durch viele Beispiele beleuchteter Aufruf an alle Menschen von Nachdenken und Gefühl zu gemeinschaftlicher Beherzigung und Linderung der unsäglichen Leiden der in unserer Umgebung lebenden Thiere. Steinkopf, Stuttgart 1832. [An urgent call, illuminated by many examples, to all people who can think and feel, for communal taking to heart and alleviating the unspeakable suffering of the animals living in our environment]

== See also ==
- Wilhelm Dietler
- Laurids Smith
