= Danu =

Danu is an ancient Scythian word meaning "river". The commonly proposed etymology of the names of the Danube River, Dnieper River, Dniester River, Don River, and Donets River.

Danu may also refer to:

== Mythology ==
- Danu (Indo European) a water goddess in the Indo-European religion
- Danu (Irish goddess), reconstructed mother goddess of the Tuatha De Danann (Old Irish: "The peoples of the goddess Danu")
- Danu (Asura), an Asura and Hindu primordial goddess of primeval waters
- Dewi Danu, a Balinese Hindu water goddess

== People ==
- Danu Innasithamby, a Sri Lankan media personality
- Danu people, an ethnic group in Myanmar

== Places ==
=== Moldova ===
- Danu, Glodeni, a commune in Glodeni district, Moldova

=== Myanmar ===
- Danu language, a Burmish language in Myanmar

== Popular culture ==
- Danú, an Irish folk music group
- The fictitious island setting of Timothy Mo's novel, The Redundancy of Courage based on the real-life nation of East Timor

== Acronym DANU ==
- Doclean Academy of Sciences and Arts, with the native acronym DANU
