= Reg Dann =

English footballer

Personal information
- Full name: Reginald Walter Dann
- Date of birth: 6 June 1916
- Place of birth: Maidstone, England
- Date of death: 1948 (aged 31–32)
- Height: 5 ft 11 1/2 in (1.82 m)
- Position: Left-half

Senior career*
Years	Team	Apps	(Gls)
1933	Blackpool	0	(0)
- Aylesford Paper Mills
1935	Gillingham	8	(0)
1936	Tottenham Hotspur	0	(0)
1939	Bradford Park Avenue	1	(0)
- * Club domestic league appearances and goals

Reginald Walter Dann (6 June 1916 – 1948) was an English professional footballer. A left-half, he was on the books of Blackpool, Gillingham, Tottenham Hotspur and Bradford Park Avenue.
