= California Casualty =

Insurance company

California Casualty Management Company
- Type: Reciprocal
- Founded: 1914
- Founder: Carl G. Brown, Sr.
- Headquarters: San Mateo, California, U.S.
- Key people: Carl B. (Beau) Brown, CPCU; Chairman of the Board industry = Insurance
- Services: Insurance
- Website: Calcas.com

California Casualty Management Company is in the business of providing individuals with insurance coverage, in particular those in the fields of education, law enforcement, fire fighting, and nursing.

== History ==
In 1914 Carl G. Brown Sr. started California Casualty Indemnity Exchange as a customer-owned company offering workers' compensation insurance to California's new and growing industries. The company was based on Carl G. Brown Sr.’s high ethical standards and business integrity. In 1917 California Casualty began offering auto insurance, followed by home insurance in 1954. His son, Carl G. Brown Jr. took over as chairman in 1957 and, in 1965 codified his father's principles in the California Casualty Code.

In 1951 California Casualty pioneered what is now an industry trend of affinity insurance programs when it received the endorsement of the California Teachers Association (CTA) to provide auto and home insurance to its members. Sixty years later they still serve CTA and its members and expanded nationally with over 100 other endorsements including the National Education Association (NEA); many police, state trooper, and firefighter associations; and universities and medical centers.

In 1978, after Carl G. Brown Jr. retired, his son, Tom Brown, carried on the family tradition and moved up to chairman of the board. Under Tom's leadership the business expanded across the country when it received the NEA endorsement.

In 2007 Beau Brown continued as the fourth generation to head California Casualty, becoming the company's president and chief executive officer. In 2013, he was named chairman and CEO and Joe Volponi became California Casualty's president. In 2021, Bob Nicolay temporarily stepped into the role of CEO with Brown remaining chairman of the board.

In 2022 Jonathan Adkisson joins California Casualty as the new president and chief executive officer. Beau Brown continues as chairman of the board and Bob Nicolay returns as a member of the board of directors.

== Products and markets ==
They provide personal insurance programs for affinity groups and their members.

California Casualty offers auto insurance in 44 states and the District of Columbia and property insurance in 38 states and the District of Columbia. (California Casualty, however, is leaving several states by February 2024.)

They also offer personal liability umbrella, earthquake, flood, boat, recreational vehicle, snowmobile, and pet insurance through business partners.

== Programs ==
Impact Teen Drivers - California Casualty Group teamed with the California Teachers Association (CTA) and the California Association of Highway Patrolmen (CAHP) to launch a teen driver awareness program aimed at saving young lives.

The program is geared directly toward the newest drivers — 10th graders — and it focuses on making them aware of the dangers of distracted driving. The public information campaign officially launched in April 2008. The website, What Do You Consider Lethal? gives teens a chance to learn from others' experiences of the impact of bad driving judgments.

== Financials ==
California Casualty's policyholder-owned organization is rated B++ (Good) with a stable outlook by A.M. Best Company. California Casualty does not carry any debt on its balance sheet and has no liquidity issues. Their conservative investment philosophy prohibits exposure to the kinds of risks that have shaken Wall Street.

== Legal structure ==
California Casualty Group comprises California Casualty Indemnity Exchange (the “Exchange”), and its four wholly owned subsidiary insurance companies: California Casualty Insurance Company, California Casualty & Fire Insurance Company, California Casualty General Insurance Company of Oregon and California Casualty Compensation Insurance Company. The insurance business of the Exchange and its subsidiary insurance companies is managed, by contract, by California Casualty Management Company, a separate and independent company. The relationship between California Casualty Management Company and the Exchange has been in place since the founding of the Exchange in 1914.

== Advisory board ==
The Exchange is governed by a 17-person advisory board. The role of the advisory board is to supervise the finances of the Exchange and oversee the Exchange's relationship with its attorney-in-fact, California Casualty Management Company.

== Locations ==
California Casualty's home office is located in San Mateo, California. The company operates two virtual call centers. The Colorado Springs, Colorado location opened in 1994. The center in Glendale, Arizona opened in 1999.

== Contributions to the community ==
California Casualty serves the broader community in many ways. Employees dedicate significant time and effort in a variety of activities to raise money for heart disease and cancer research, and to help those less fortunate with food and gifts during the holidays. California Casualty also allows customers to reduce their mail by opting for electronic payments and document delivery.

The company fosters a culture of participation and volunteerism through a variety of programs in 44 states, including:

- Adopt A School
- American Heart Association
- Athletics Grants
- Care and Share Food Bank
- Christmas Unlimited "Operation Back to School" and holiday toy drive
- CTA Disaster Relief Fund
- Help Your Classroom monetary donation program
- Hurricane Harvey Relief
- JPMorgan Chase Corporate Challenge Run
- Kansas KVC Back to School Drive
- Music & Arts Grant
- LaPorte, TX Fire Department flood damage vehicles for extrication training in conjunction with SFFMA
- National Fallen Firefighters Foundation Memorial and 9/11 Stair Climbs
- National Volunteer Fire Council's Jr. Firefighter of the Year and Junior Firefighter Program of the Year
- NEA Foundation's California Casualty Award for Teaching Excellence
- Police Officers Relief and Education Foundation Wildfire Relief Fund
- School Lounge Makeover
- State affiliate charitable fund tournaments
- The Salvation Army

While not a complete list of activities, it illustrates the corporate citizenship of California Casualty and its employees.

== The Carl Brown, Jr. Award of Excellence ==
On January 1, 1980, the company established the Carl G. Brown Jr. Award of Excellence, an annual award to be given to California Casualty Management Company employee for excellence in their performance of business activities and involvement in the community.

Although many companies have such annual awards for top-performing employees, the Carl Brown Jr. Award of Excellence has a unique theme. Tom Brown felt that the award should have a permanent exhibit in the California Casualty Group's home offices. Edward J. Fraughton, a well-known artist from Utah was commissioned to create a sculpture of a mountain man. Fraughton created two pieces, the first entitled "Edge of Silence," is the permanent exhibit and the second entitled “The Pathfinder” is given as the annual award. The Carl G. Brown Jr. Award goes to an employee for excellence in their performance of business activities and involvement in the community.

== Competition ==
California Casualty does not serve the general public. They focus efforts on affinity niche market group members.

== Service ratings ==
AM Best
California DOI's Consumer Complaint Study
