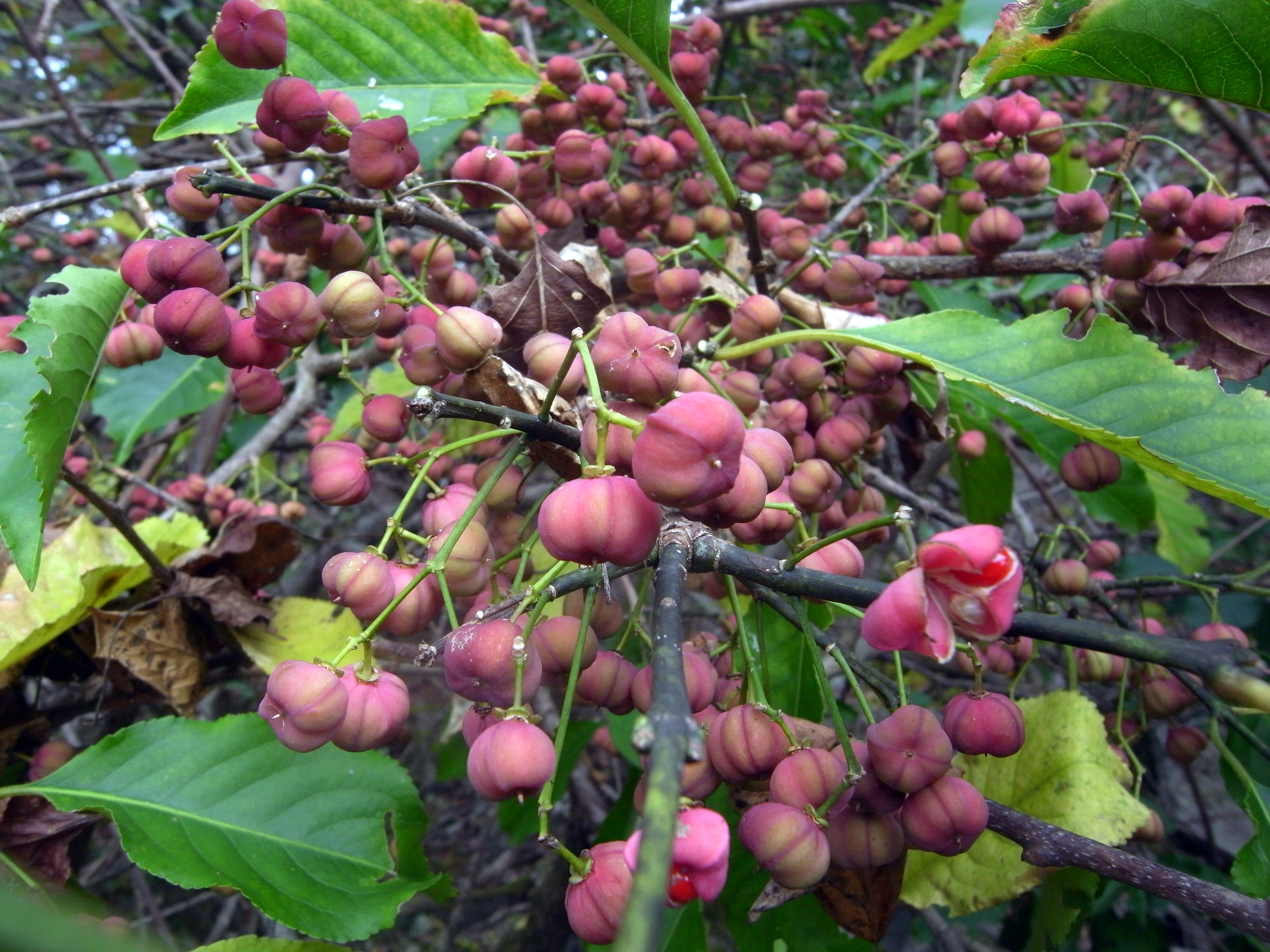
- Fruits

Scientific classification
- Kingdom: Plantae
- Clade: Tracheophytes
- Clade: Angiosperms
- Clade: Eudicots
- Clade: Rosids
- Order: Celastrales
- Family: Celastraceae
- Genus: Euonymus
- Species: E. hamiltonianus

Binomial name
- Euonymus hamiltonianus Wall.

Synonyms
- Euonymus lanceifolius Euonymus nikoensis Euonymus sieboldianus Euonymus yedoensis Euonymus bungeanum (misspelling)

= Euonymus hamiltonianus =

Species of flowering plant

Euonymus hamiltonianus, known by the common names Hamilton's spindletree, Himalayan spindle, and Siebold's spindle is a species of flowering plant in the family Celastraceae. It is native to Asia, where it is distributed in Afghanistan, Russia, China, Japan, Korea, India, Nepal, Pakistan, Bhutan, Thailand, and Myanmar. This is one of the most common Euonymus species. It is cultivated in gardens and landscapes in other parts of the world.

== Description ==
In the wild, this species may grow to be a shrub of 3 meters or a tree up to 20 meters tall. The leaf blades are somewhat oval with pointed tips and measure up to 15 centimeters long. They are leathery to papery in texture with rough surfaces and slightly wavy edges. The inflorescence is a cymose cluster of several white flowers, each nearly a centimeter wide. The brown, yellowish, or reddish fruit capsule splits into four sections holding brown seeds with orange arils.

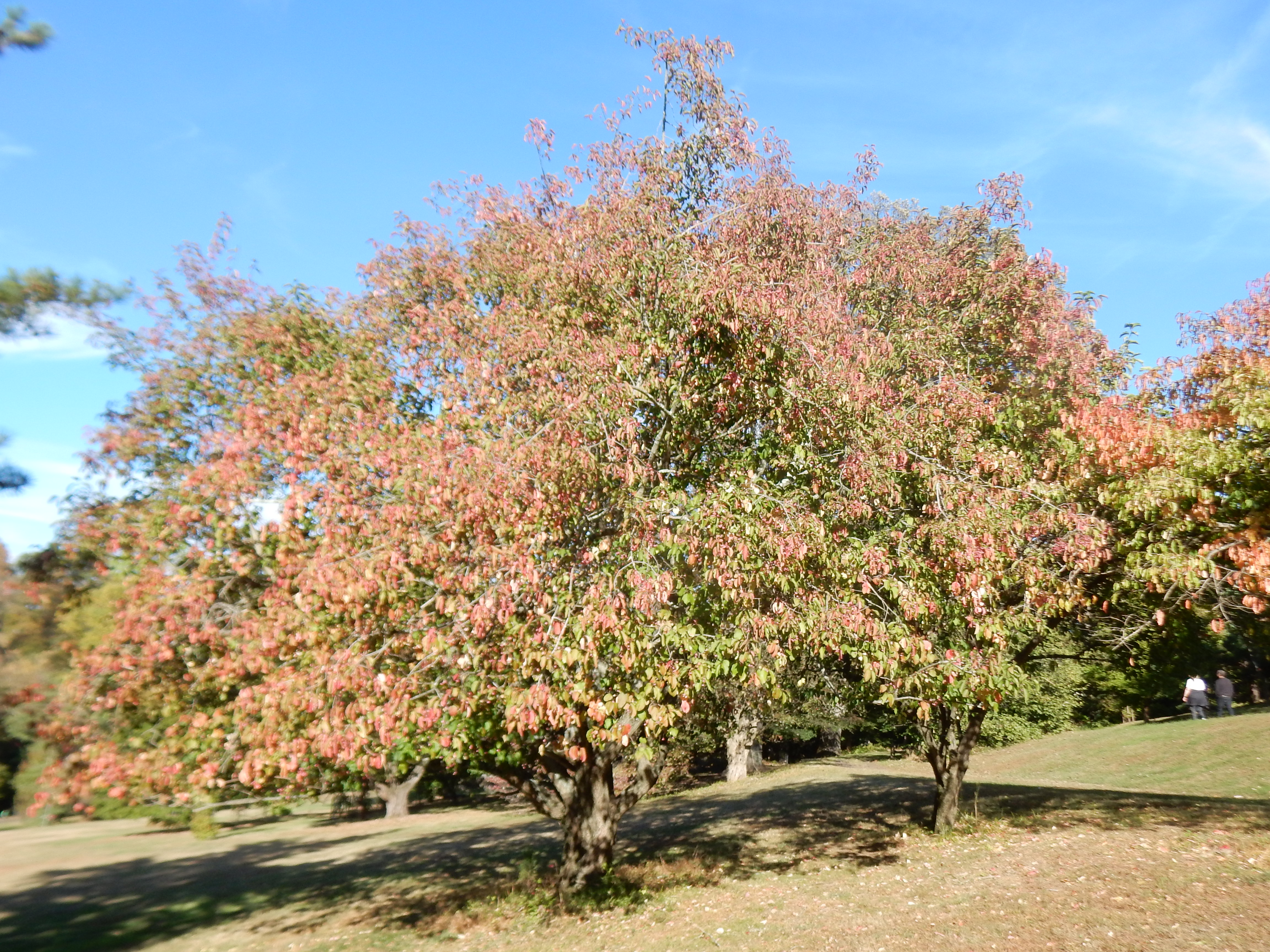
Euonymus hamiltonianus trees

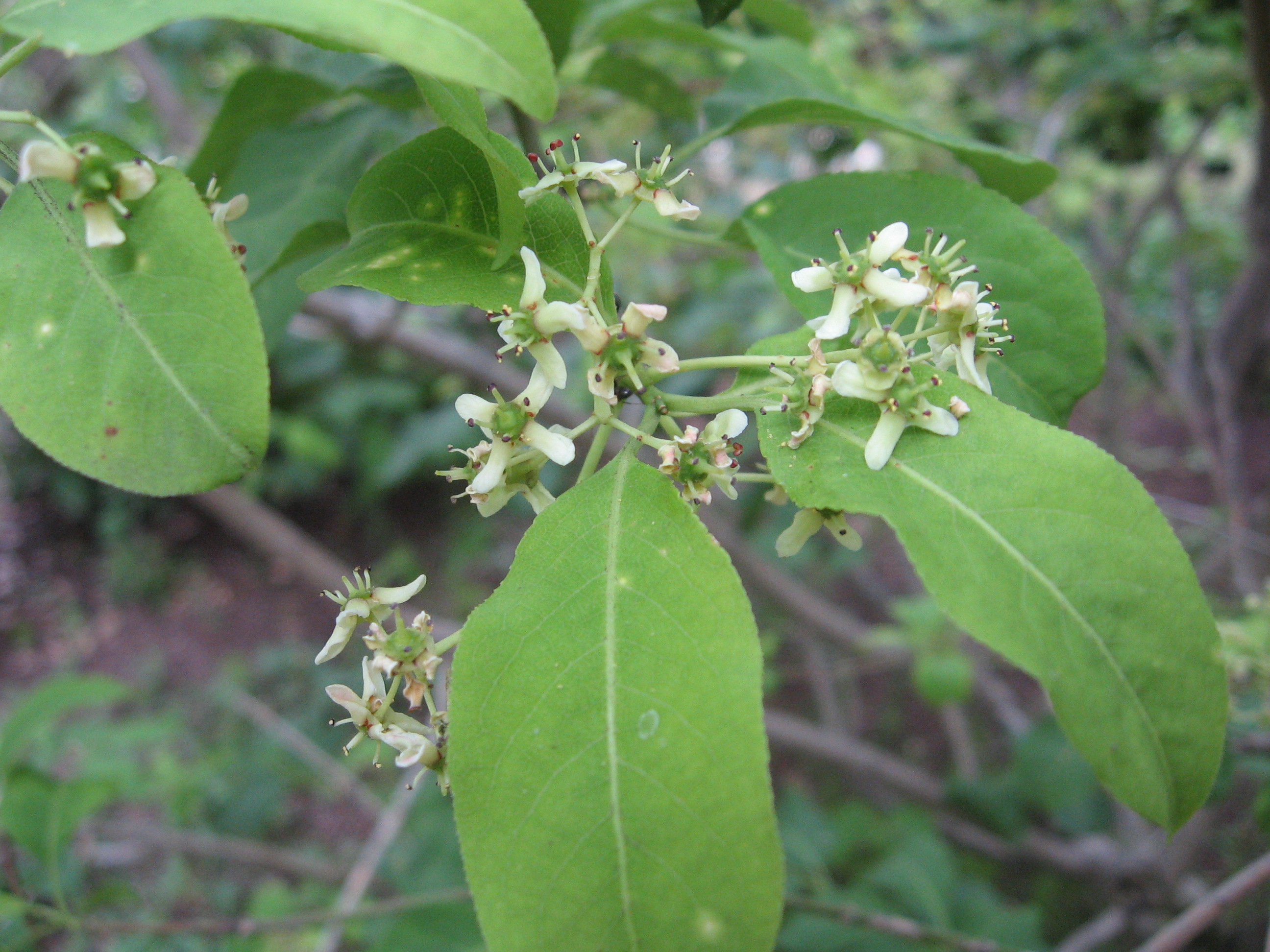
Detail of flowers

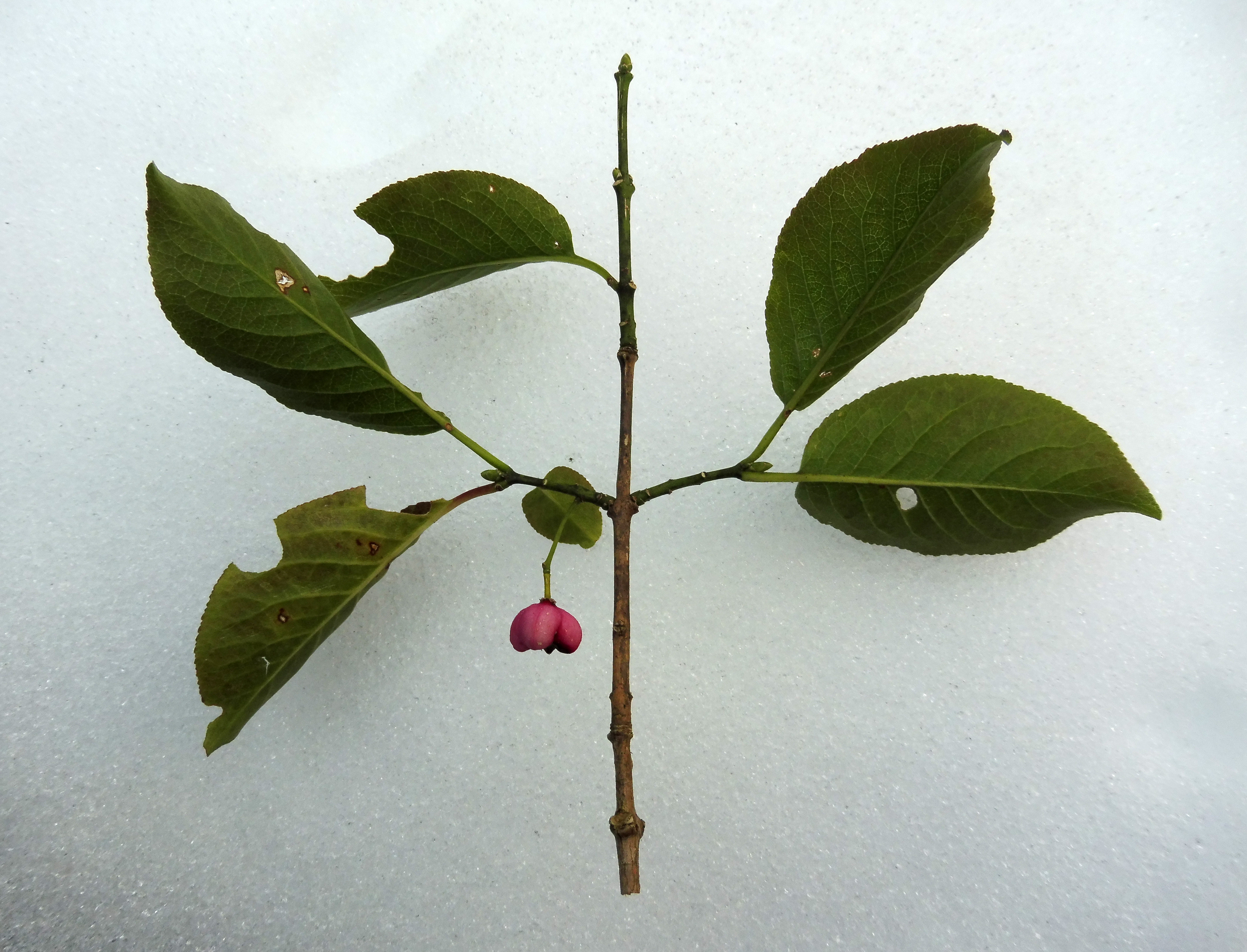
Leaves are ovate to elliptic

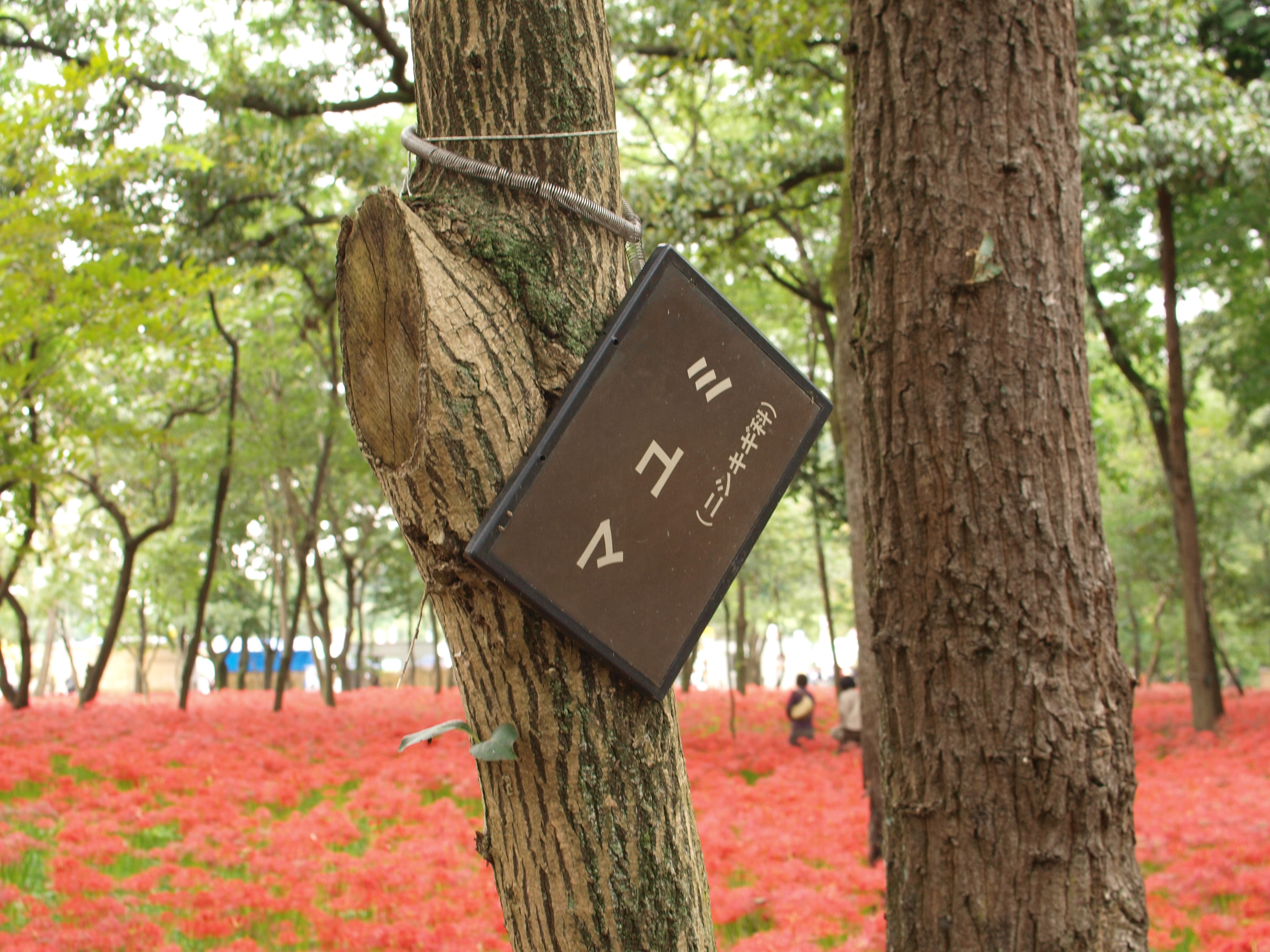
Trunk of Euonymus hamiltonianus

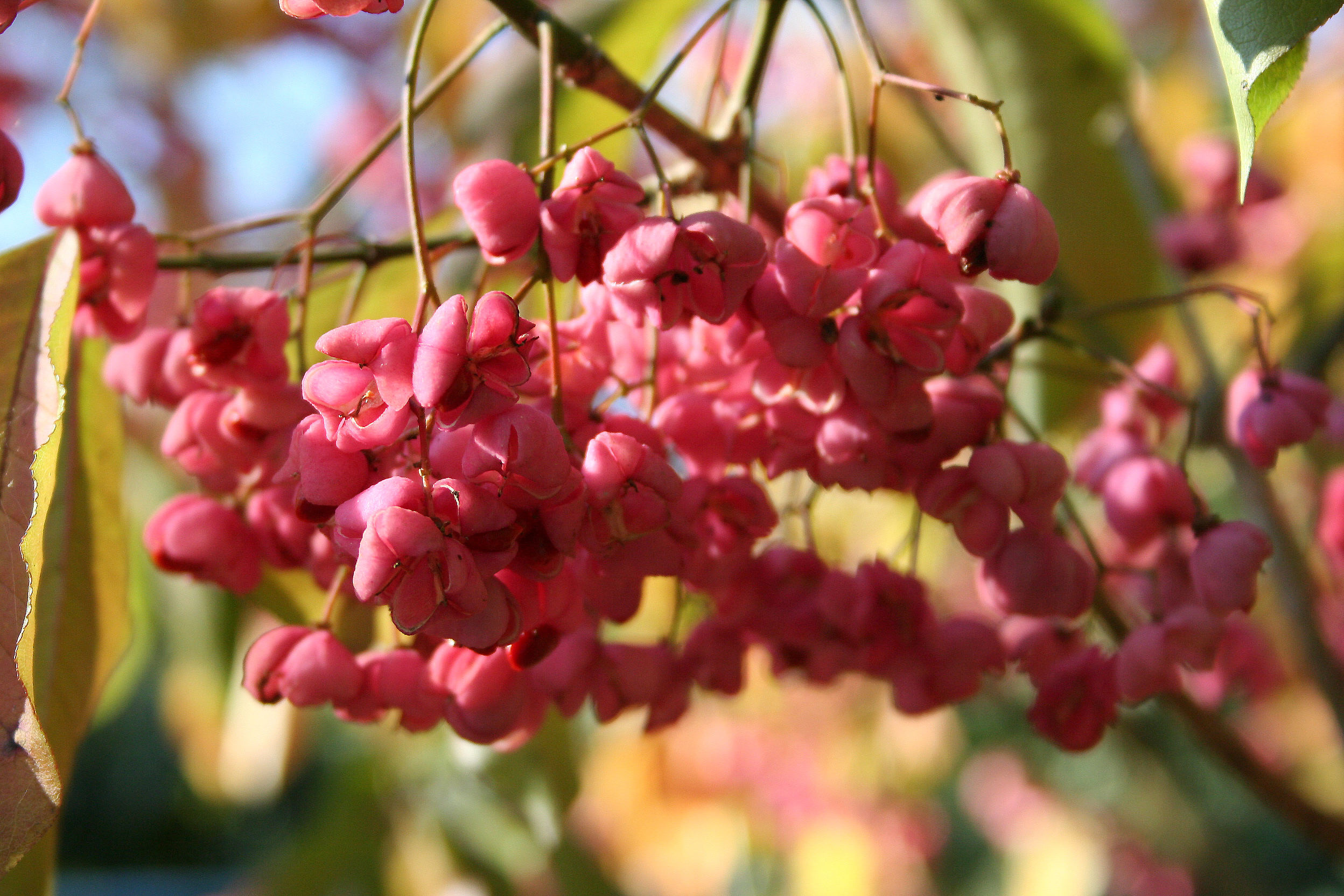
'Winter Glory' cultivar

== Taxonomy ==
This species includes several varieties which some authorities maintain as separate species, E. yedoensis.

== Cultivation ==
Like some other spindles, this plant is cultivated as an ornamental for its fall foliage, which can be many bright shades of red, pink, and yellow. The fruits and large seeds are also considered attractive. Cultivars include 'Coral Charm', which has light pink fruit capsules containing seeds with red arils, and 'Red Elf', a shrubbier breed with dark pink fruits and seeds with orange-red arils.

== Uses ==
A number of novel chemical compounds have been isolated from this plant, including the coumarins euonidiol and euoniside and several triterpenes.
