= Matei-Agathon Dan =

Romanian economist and politician (1949–2023)

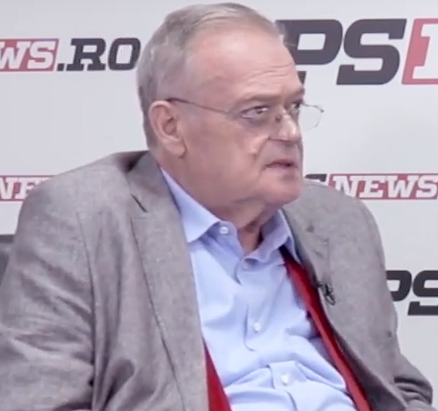
- Dan in 2019
- Born: 17 September 1949; Bucharest, Romania
- Died: 20 July 2023 (aged 73)
- Education: Bucharest Academy of Economic Studies
- Political party: Social Democratic
- Spouse: Otilia (m. 1971)
- Children: 1

Matei-Agathon Dan (17 September 1949 – 20 July 2023) was a Romanian economist and politician. A member of the Social Democratic Party (PSD), he was a member of the Romanian Chamber of Deputies for Bacău County from 1992 to 2004. In the Nicolae Văcăroiu cabinet, he was Tourism Minister from 1992 to 1996, and again held that office in the Adrian Năstase cabinet from December 2000 to June 2003, when responsibility for Tourism was assigned to Miron Mitrea.

== Biography ==
Born in Bucharest on 17 September 1949, Dan studied Finance and Accounting at the Academy of Economic Studies, graduating in 1971. Before the 1989 Revolution, he was economic director at the Institute for Research and Technological Engineering, Planning and Production of Non-ferrous and Rare Metals in Bucharest. After the fall of Communism, he was one of the founders of the PDSR (PSD from 2001), as well as a member of its National Council. In 1991–92 he served as sub-secretary of state, dealing with government relations with trade unions and management. Also in 1991, he won a scholarship in macroeconomics in Japan, allowing him to see first-hand how a free-market economy works, including using an ATM for the first time.

During his first stint as Tourism Minister (1992–1996), Dan was also vice president of the World Tourism Organization's general assembly. He was a member of the Chamber's Foreign Policy Committee, and active in the Parliamentary Assembly of the Black Sea Economic Cooperation. His second time in government (2000–2003), when he was appointed by his high-school classmate and friend Adrian Năstase, Dan drew attention for strongly promoting a Disneyland-style theme park, "Dracula Park", which ultimately was not built. He also worked on promoting skiing in the Carpathians, Danube cruises, Romanian wine, countryside vacations and Bukovina. In January 2009, Dan quit the PSD in order to become secretary general and president of the Employer Confederation of Romanian Industry.

Dan and his wife Otilia, whom he married in 1971, had one son, Tudor. Dan died in July 2023 at age 73.
