= Danny (disambiguation) =

Danny is a masculine given name.

Danny may also refer to:

== Film and television ==
- Danny (2014 film), a Canadian documentary film about former Newfoundland and Labrador premier Danny Williams
- Danny (2019 film), a Canadian documentary film about director Aaron Zeghers's uncle, Danny Ryder
- Danny (2020 film), an Indian Tamil-language film
- Danny (TV series), a short-lived CBS sitcom starring Daniel Stern

== Music ==
- "Danny", a song by C418 from Minecraft – Volume Alpha
- "Danny", a song by Noga Erez from The Vandalist
- "Danny", a song by Tiffany from the album Tiffany
- "Lonely Blue Boy" (song), originally titled "Danny", a 1960 song from the film King Creole

== Other uses ==
- Danny, the Champion of the World, 1975 book by Roald Dahl
- Danny House, an Elizabethan mansion in West Sussex, England
- Hurricane Danny (disambiguation), any of several Atlantic hurricanes
- Operation Danny, 1948 Israeli attack on Arab areas in Palestine
