= List of people with given name Daniel =

Name list

Daniel
- Gender: Male

Origin
- Origin: Hebrew
- Meaning: "God is my judge"

Other names
- Related names: Dan, Danny, Dani, Daniella (English); دانيال (Danyal) (Arabic); Դանիէլ (Taniēl) (Armenian); Danel (Basque); Deniel (Breton); Даниел (Daniel) (Bulgarian); Daniël, Daan Dutch); Tanel (Estonian); Taniela (Fijian); Taneli (Finnish); Dany (French); დანიელი (Danieli) (Georgian); Δανιήλ (Daniil) (Greek); דָּנִיֵּאל (Daniyyel / Dāniyyêl) (Hebrew); Dániel (Hungarian); Dainéil, Dónall (Irish); Daniele (Italian); ダニエル (Danieru) (Japanese); 다니엘 (Daniel) (Korean); دانيال (Danyal/Daniel) (Kurdish); دانيال (Dâniyal / Danial) (Persian); Danilo / Данило (Brazilian Portuguese, Italian, Slovene, Croatian/Serbian, Ukrainian); Dănuṭ (Romanian); Даниил (Daniil) (Russian); Данијел / Danijel (Serbian / Slovene, Croatian); Daniel (Portuguese, Spanish); ܪܐܢܝܠ (Daniyyel) (Syriac); Danyel, Danyal (Turkish); Дониёр, Doniyor (Uzbek); Deiniol (Welsh)

This is a list of notable people with the given name Daniel:

== Mononymic ==
- Daniel (biblical figure), the hero of the biblical Book of Daniel. A noble Jewish youth of Jerusalem, he is taken into captivity by Nebuchadnezzar of Babylon and serves the king and his successors with loyalty and ability until the time of the Persian conqueror Cyrus, all the while remaining true to the God of Israel.
- Daniel (Montenegrin singer), stage name of Milan Popović, Montenegrin singer
- Daniel (Brazilian singer), stage name of José Daniel Camillo, Brazilian sertanejo singer, originally part of sertanejo duo João Paulo & Daniel
- Daniel (footballer, born 1961), Macanese footballer who played as a defender
- Daniel of Moscow (1261–1303), prince, forefather of all the Grand Princes of Moscow in Russia
- Prince Daniel, Duke of Västergötland (born 1973), Swedish prince
- Daniel of Padua, 2nd-century Italian martyr
- Daniel of Persia, 4th-century Persian martyr
- Daniel of Scetis, 5th-century Egyptian Christian monk

== A ==
- Daniel Aaron (1912–2016), American writer and academic
- Daniel Aase (born 1989), Norwegian footballer
- Daniel Abadi, American computer scientist
- Daniel Abbott (1682–1760), British colonel
- Daniel Abdulai Bayensi (born 1940), Ghanaian politician
- Daniel Abebe, American lawyer
- Daniel Abel (born 1961), American Coast Guard admiral
- Daniel Abenzoar-Foulé (born 1981), French-born athlete
- Daniel Abibi, Congolese politician, mathematician and diplomat
- Daniel Abineri (born 1958), English songwriter, actor, director, narrator and playwright
- Daniel Abou Sleiman (born 1991), Lebanese international rugby footballer
- Daniel Abraham (author) (born 1969), American writer
- Daniel Abraham (rugby league) (born 1981), Australian rugby league footballer
- Daniel Abraham (conductor) (born 1968), American conductor and musicologist
- Daniel Abraham (cyclist) (born 1985), Dutch-Eritrean cyclist
- Daniel Abraham (bishop), South Indian bishop
- Daniel Abt (born 1992), German racing driver
- Daniel Abubakar Yisa, Nigerian Anglican bishop
- Daniel Abugattás (1955–2025), Peruvian politician
- Daniel Acácio (born 1977), Brazilian mixed martial arts fighter
- Daniel Aceves (born 1964), Mexican wrestler
- Daniel Acharuparambil (1939–2009), Latin Catholic Indian archbishop
- Daniel Acon (born 1958), American special effects coordinator
- Daniel Acosta (born 1991), Mexican footballer
- Daniel Acuña, Spanish comic book artist
- Daniel Adade (born 1995), Ghana-born East Timorese footballer
- Daniel Adair (born 1975), Canadian drummer
- Daniel Adam (born 1998), Moldovan footballer
- Daniel Adams-Ray (born 1983), Swedish rapper, singer, and fashion designer
- Daniel Adams (physician) (1773–1864), American physician and politician
- Daniel Adams (director) (born 1953), Anglo-American film director
- Daniel Weisiger Adams (1821–1872), American lawyer
- Daniel Adamson (1820–1890), English engineer
- Daniel Dulany Addison (1863–1936), American clergyman and writer
- Daniel Addo (footballer, born 1976), Ghanaian footballer
- Daniel Addo (footballer, born 1987), Ghanaian football defensive midfielder
- Daniel Addo (soldier), Ghanaian general
- Daniel Addo (footballer, born 1989), Ghanaian footballer
- Daniel Adeboboye (born 1999), Canadian gridiron football player
- Daniel Adejo (born 1989), Nigerian professional footballer
- Daniel Adel (born 1962), American painter
- Daniel Ademinokan, Nigerian-born director, producer and screenwriter
- Daniel Nii Adjei (born 1989), Ghanaian footballer
- Daniel Adler (sailor) (born 1958), Brazilian sailor
- Daniel Adlung (born 1987), German footballer
- Daniel Adni (born 1951), Israeli pianist
- Daniel Adomako (born 1979), Ghanaian sprinter
- Daniel Adongo (born 1989), Kenyan sportsman
- Daniel Adshead (born 2001), English footballer
- Brandford Daniel Adu (born 1942), Ghanaian politician
- Daniel Adzer (1732–1808), Danish medal maker
- Daniel Aegerter (born 1969), Swiss businessman and venture capitalist
- Daniel Afadzwu (born 1995), Ghanaian professional footballer
- Daniel Afriyie (born 2001), Ghanaian footballer
- Daniel Agger (born 1984), Danish international footballer
- Daniel Agina (fl. 2000s), Kenyan football defender
- Daniel Agnew (1809–1902), American judge
- Daniel Agüero, Peruvian artistic gymnast
- Daniel Aguilar (born 1998), Mexican footballer
- Daniel Aguilera (born 1988), Chilean footballer
- Daniel Aguillón (1984–2008), Mexican boxer
- Daniel Aguiñaga (born 1994), Mexican footballer
- Daniel Aguirre (born 1999), American soccer player
- Daniel Agyei (footballer, born 1989) (born 1989), Ghanaian footballer
- Daniel Kofi Agyei (born 1992), Ghanaian footballer
- Daniel Ohene Agyekum (born 1942), Ghanaian diplomat
- Daniel Ahern, Australian recording artist
- Daniel Ahlers (born 1973), American businessman and politician
- Daniel Ahmed (born 1965), Argentine footballer and coach
- Daniel Ahn (born 1994) (a.k.a. Niel), South Korean singer-songwriter and actor
- Daniel Åhsberg (born 1985), Swedish ice hockey player
- Daniel Ahumada (born 1960), Chilean footballer
- Daniel Ainsleigh (born 1976), English actor and acting coach
- Daniel Ajayi-Adeniran, Nigerian pastor
- Daniel Akaka (1924–2018), American politician
- Daniel Akenine (born 1974), Swedish writer and computer scientist
- Daniel Akerib (born 1950), American physicist
- Daniel Akerson (born 1948), American business CEO
- Daniel Akhtyamov (born 1985), Azerbaijani footballer
- Daniel L. Akin (born 1957), American theological seminary president and author
- Daniel Akintonde, Nigerian politician
- Daniel Akiva (born 1953), Israeli musician
- Daniel Awet Akot, South Sudanese politician
- Daniel Akpeyi (born 1986), Nigerian footballer
- Daniel Afedzi Akyeampong (1938–2015), Ghanaian academic
- Daniel al-Kumisi (died 946), Karaite rabbi
- Daniel Aladesanmi II (1902–1983), King of Ado Ekiti
- Daniel Alaei (born 1982), Professional poker player
- Daniel Alagille (1925–2005), French pediatrician
- Daniel Alarcón (born 1977), Peruvian-American novelist, journalist and radio producer
- Daniel Alba (1940–2012), Mexican wrestler
- Daniel G. Albert (1901–1983), American lawyer and politician
- Daniel M. Albert (born 1936), American ophthalmologist, ocular cancer researcher and medical historian
- Daniel Alberto (born 1956), Argentine footballer
- Daniel Albo (born 1964), American surgeon, medical researcher
- Daniel Albrecht (born 1983), Swiss alpine skier
- Daniel Albright (1945–2015), American literary critic and academic
- Daniel Alcaíno (born 1972), Chilean actor and comedian
- Daniel Alcántar (born 1976), Mexican footballer
- Daniel Aldrich (1918–1990), American academic
- Daniel P. Aldrich (born 1974), American political scientist
- Daniel Aleksandrov (wrestler) (born 1991), Bulgarian Greco-Roman wrestler
- Daniel Alessi (born 1997), Australian soccer player
- Daniel Alexander (basketball) (born 1991), New Zealand basketball player
- Daniel Asher Alexander (1768–1846), English architect and engineer
- Daniel Robert Alexander (1859–??), American settler & trader
- Daniel Alexandersson (born 1978), Swedish footballer
- Daniel Alfei (born 1992), Welsh footballer
- Daniel Alfredson (born 1959), Swedish film director
- Daniel Alfredsson (born 1972), Swedish ice hockey player
- Daniel Algrant (born 1959), American film director
- Daniel Allain, Canadian politician
- Daniel Allcock (born 1969), American mathematician
- Daniel Allerstorfer (born 1992), Austrian Olympic judoka
- Daniel B. Allyn (born 1959), United States Army general
- Daniel Alm (born 1971), Swedish Pentecostal pastor
- Daniel Almaral (born 1983), Mexican footballer and manager
- Daniel Almeida (born 1984), Portuguese footballer
- Daniel Aaron Aloni (born 1964), American talent agent
- Daniel Alonim, Israeli international lawn bowler
- Daniel Alonso (born 1956), Uruguayan footballer
- Daniel Alpert, American investment banker
- Daniel Altmaier (born 1998), German tennis player
- Daniel R. Altschuler (born 1944), Uruguayan physicist
- Daniel Alvarado (1949–2020), Venezuelan actor
- Daniel Alvarez (soccer, born 1978), American soccer midfielder
- Daniel Alvaro (born 1993), Italy international rugby league footballer
- Daniel Alves (rower) (born 1969), Portuguese rower
- Daniel Amador (born 1997), Mexican footballer
- Daniel Amalm (born 1979), Australian actor and musician
- Daniel Amardeilh (born 1959), French cyclist
- Daniel Amartey (born 1994), Ghanaian association football player
- Daniel Ambrose (c. 1843–1895), Irish medical doctor and politician
- Daniel Amen (born 1954), American celebrity doctor
- Daniel W. Ames, American politician
- Daniel Attoumou Amicchia (1908–1994), Ghanaian photographer
- Daniel Amigo (born 1995), American Argentine Mexican basketball player
- Daniel Amit (1938–2007), Israeli physicist and pacifist
- Daniel Ammann, Swiss journalist and author
- Daniel Ammann (boxer) (born 1982), Australian boxer
- Daniel Ammen (1820–1898), United States Navy admiral
- Daniel Amokachi (born 1972), Nigerian footballer
- Daniel Amora (born 1987), Brazilian footballer
- Daniel Amorim (born 1989), Brazilian footballer
- Daniel Kwame Ampofo (born 1950), Ghanaian politician
- Daniel Ançay (born 1970), Swiss footballer
- Daniel Andersen (1885–1959), Danish composer, and sculptor
- Daniel Bachmann Andersen (born 1990), Danish equestrian
- Daniel Anderson (rugby league) (born 1967), Australian rugby league coach
- Daniel Anderson (musician) (born 1986), American musician and record producer
- Daniel L. Anderson (born 1968), American politician
- Daniel P. Anderson, American judge
- Daniel R. Anderson (born 1944), American psychologist
- Daniel Andersson (footballer, born 1977), Swedish footballer
- Daniel Andersson (footballer, born 1972), Swedish association football goalkeeper
- Daniel Andersson (speedway rider) (born 1974), Swedish speedway rider
- Daniel Andersson (politician) (born 1986), Swedish politician
- Daniel André (1965–2022), Mauritian sprinter
- Daniel Andújar (born 1994), Spanish middle-distance runner
- Daniel García Andújar (born 1966), Spanish artist, activist and theorist
- Daniel Anefie (born 2000), Ghanaian cricketer
- Daniel M. Angel (1911–1999), British film producer
- Daniel Angelici (born 1964), Argentine lawyer, entrepreneur and football executive
- Daniel Angelocrator (1569–1635), German Reformed minister
- Daniel Anguiano (1882–1969), Spanish trade unionist and communist politician
- Daniel Angulo (born 1986), Ecuadorian footballer
- Daniel dos Anjos (born 1996), Brazilian footballer
- Daniel Ankarloo (born 1970), Swedish historian of economics
- Daniel Francis Annan (1928–2006), Ghanaian politician and judge
- Daniel Annerose, CEO and founder of Manobi
- Daniel Annesley (fl. 1694), English governor of Bombay
- Daniel Anrig (born 1972), Swiss Guard commander
- Daniel Anthony (actor) (born 1987), British actor
- Daniel R. Anthony Jr. (1870–1931), American politician
- Daniel Read Anthony (1824–1904), American publisher and activist
- Daniel Antonsson (born 1974), Swedish guitarist and bassist
- Daniel Antopolsky (born 1948), American country musician
- Daniel Antosch (born 2000), Austrian association football player
- Daniel Antúnez (born 1986), American soccer player
- Daniel Anwuli (born 1997), Nigerian chess player
- Daniel Anyembe (born 1998), Kenyan footballer
- Daniel Anyiam (1926–1977), Nigerian footballer and coach
- Daniel Apai (born 1977), American professor and astrophysicist
- Daniel Appleton (1785–1849), American publisher
- Daniel Appling (1787–1817), United States Army officer
- Daniel Aquino (born 1965), Argentine footballer
- Daniel Arango, American painter
- Daniel Aranzubia (born 1979), Spanish footballer
- Daniel Arasse (1944–2003), French art historian
- Daniel Arbess (born 1961), Canadian investor
- Daniel Arcas (born 1990), Spanish motorcycle racer
- Daniel Arce (born 1992), Spanish steeplechase runner
- Daniel Archer (born 1991), Australian rules football player
- Daniel Archibong (American football) (born 1997), American football player
- Daniel Arenas (born 1979), Colombian and Mexican actor
- Daniel Arévalo Gallegos (born 1962), Mexican politician
- Daniel Arias (born 1998), American football player
- Daniel Ariciu (1950–2025), Romanian footballer
- Daniel Arismendi (born 1982), Venezuelan footballer
- Daniel Arkin, American television writer and producer
- Daniel Armand-Delille (1906–1958), French bobsledder
- Daniel Armand Lee (a.k.a. Tablo), Korean-Canadian hip hop artist
- Daniel Armand-Delille (1906–1958), French bobsledder
- Daniel I of Armenia, 4th-century Catholicoi of Armenia
- Daniel Armstrong (film director) (born 1971), Australian film director
- Daniel Armstrong (footballer, born 1997), Scottish professional footballer
- Daniel W. Armstrong (born 1949), American chemist and academic
- Daniel Arnall, American news executive
- Daniel Arnamnart (born 1989), Australian swimmer
- Daniel Arnefjord (born 1979), Swedish footballer
- Daniel Arnold (photographer) (born 1980), American photographer
- Daniel Arnold (actor), Canadian actor and writer
- Daniel A. Arnold (born 1965), American scholar and philosopher
- Johann Georg Daniel Arnold (1780–1829), German poet
- Daniel Arnoldi (1774–1849), German Canadian physician
- Daniel I. Arnon (1910–1994), Polish-American plant physiologist
- Daniel Arreola (born 1985), Mexican footballer
- Daniel Arrocha (born 1995), Danish footballer
- Daniel Arroyave (born 2000), Colombian cyclist
- Daniel Arroyo (born 1966), Argentine politician
- Daniel Arsand (born 1950), French writer
- Daniel Arsenault, American photographer
- Daniel Arshack (born 1956), American lawyer
- Daniel Arsham (born 1980), American architect
- Daniel Artmann (born 1988), German politician
- Daniel Paul Arulswamy (1916–2003), Indian clergyman and bishop
- Daniel Arzani (born 1999), Australian footballer
- Daniel Arzola (born 1989), Venezuelan writer and visual artist
- Daniel Asafo-Agyei, Ghanaian politician
- Daniel Asama Ago, Nigerian politician
- Daniel V. Asay (1840–1930), American iceboat racer
- Daniel Ascanio (born 2000), Colombian footballer
- Daniel Aselo, politician of the Democratic Republic of the Congo
- Daniel Asenov (born 1997), Bulgarian boxer
- Daniel Ash (born 1957), English singer-songwriter
- Daniel M. Ashe, American wildlife politician
- Daniel F. Ashford (1879–1929), American politician
- Daniel Kwesi Ashiamah (born 1968), Ghanaian politician
- Daniel Owusu Asiamah (born 2003), Ghanaian preacher
- Daniel Asia (born 1953), American composer
- Daniel Ask (born 1998), Swedish footballer
- Daniel Askill (born 1977), Australian filmmaker and artist
- Daniel Astrain (born 1948), Spanish footballer
- Daniel Asua Wubah, American academic
- Daniel Effiong Asuquo, Nigerian politician
- Daniel E. Atha (born 1962), American botanist
- Daniel Atienza (born 1974), Spanish cyclist
- Daniel Atkins (1866–1923), United States Navy sailor
- Daniel E. Atkins (born 1962), American computer scientist
- Daniel Atkinson (biochemist) (1921–2024), American biochemist
- Daniel Atkinson (born 2001), Italian rugby league footballer
- Daniel Attah (born 1978), Nigerian boxer
- Daniel Attard, Maltese politician
- Daniel Attinger, Swiss-born American mechanical engineer
- Daniel Auber (1782–1871), French opera composer
- Daniel Audette (born 1996), Canadian ice hockey player
- Daniel Auer (born 1994), Austrian cyclist
- Daniel d'Auger de Subercase (1661–1732), French governor of Newfoundland
- Daniel Aukin, British-American theater director
- Daniel Austrich, Russian classical violinist
- Daniel Auteuil (born 1950), French actor and director
- Daniel Avery (politician) (1766–1842), American politician
- Daniel Avery (Latter Day Saints) (1798–1851), Early Mormon leader
- Daniel Avery (musician) (born 1986), English electronic music producer and DJ
- Daniel Ávila (born 1984), Brazilian actor
- Daniel Ávila Ruiz (born 1971), Mexican politician
- Daniel Avilés (born 2001), Spanish actor
- Daniel Kwasi Avoke (born 1933), Ghanaian politician
- Daniel Avramovski (born 1995), Macedonian footballer
- Daniel Awde (born 1988), British runner and decathlete
- Daniel Awdry (1924–2008), British politician
- Daniel Awuni (born 2006), Ghanaian footballer
- Daniel I. Axelrod (1910–1998), American paleo-ecologist
- Daniel Axt (born 1991), German actor
- Daniel Ayala (born 1990), Spanish footballer
- Daniel Ayala (handballer) (born 1995), Chilean handball player
- Daniel Ayamdo Ayagiba, Ghanaian politician
- Daniel Azevedo (born 1998), Portuguese footballer
- Daniel Azulay (1947–2020), Brazilian cartoonist

== B ==
- Daniel Babka (born 1972), Slovak ice hockey player
- Daniel Babor (born 1999), Czech cyclist
- Daniel Babut (1929–2009), French philosopher
- Daniel Bacheler (1572–1619), English lutenist and composer
- Daniel Bachman (born 1989), American guitarist
- Daniel Bachmann (born 1994), Austrian footballer
- Daniel Backhouse (1741–1811), English slave trader
- Daniel Bäckström (politician) (born 1975), Swedish politician
- Daniel Bäckström (footballer) (born 1987), Swedish association football manager
- Daniel S. Bacon (1798–1866), American politician and judge
- Daniel Bacquelaine (born 1952), Belgian politician
- Daniel D. Badger (1806–c. 1884), American architect
- Daniel Baharier, Israeli artist and sculptor
- Daniel Bahr (born 1976), German politician
- Daniel Baianinho (born 1999), Brazilian footballer
- Daniel Baier (born 1984), German footballer
- Daniel Bailey (born 1986), Antiguan sprinter
- Daniel Bailey (basketball) (born 1990), American basketball player
- Daniel A. Bailey (1894–1970), American politician
- Daniel Bainbridge (born 1999), British javelin thrower
- Daniel F. Bakeman (1759–1869), Last surviving American Revolutionary War soldier
- Daniel Baker (businessman), American businessman
- Daniel Baker (Presbyterian minister) (1791–1857), American clergyman
- Daniel A. Baker (born 1979), English artist
- Daniel C. Baker (1816–1863), American politician
- Daniel N. Baker (born 1947), American space scientist
- Daniel Bakongolia (born 1987), Congolese footballer
- Daniel Balaji (1975–2024), Indian film actor
- Daniel Bălan (born 1979), Romanian footballer
- Daniel Bălașa (born 1981), Romanian footballer
- Daniel Balavoine (1952–1986), French singer and songwriter
- Daniel Baldacin (born 1977), Brazilian handball player
- Daniel Baldi (born 1981), Uruguayan football striker
- Daniel Baldridge (born 1985), American football player
- Daniel Baldwin (born 1960), American actor
- Daniel P. Baldwin (c. 1837–1908), American lawyer, judge, and politician
- Daniel Baldy (born 1994), German politician
- Daniel Ballart (born 1973), Spanish water polo player
- Daniel Balsam, American lawyer
- Daniel Bamberg (born 1984), Brazilian footballer
- Daniel Bameyi (born 2006), Nigerian footballer
- Daniel Bamidele (1949–1986), Nigerian army officer
- Daniel Bandy (born 1975), Australian rules footballer
- Dániel Bánffy (1893–1955), Hungarian politician
- Daniel Bång (born 1987), Swedish ice hockey player
- Daniel Banjaqui (born 2008), Portuguese footballer
- Daniel Bar-Tal (born 1946), Israeli psychologist
- Daniel Barbara (born 1974), French footballer
- Daniel Barben (born 1961), Swiss academic
- Daniel Barber, multiple people
- Daniel E. Barbey (1889–1969), United States Navy admiral
- Daniel Barbier (1907–1965), French astronomer
- Daniel Barbosa (politician) (born 1984), Brazilian politician
- Daniel Camargo Barbosa (1930–1994), Colombian serial killer and rapist
- Daniel Barbu (1957–2024), Romanian political scientist
- Daniel Barbus (born 1996), Polish footballer
- Daniel Bard (born 1985), American baseball player
- Daniel Barden (footballer) (born 2001), Welsh footballer
- Daniel Barenboim (born 1942), Argentine-Israeli pianist and conductor
- Daniel von Bargen (1950–2015), American actor
- Daniel Kiptoo Bargoria (born 1984), Kenyan lawyer and energy practitioner
- Daniel Barker, multiple people
- Daniel Barlaser (born 1997), Turkish footballer
- Daniel Barna (born 1986), Romanian footballer
- Daniel D. Barnard (1797–1861), American politician and diplomat
- Daniel Barnet Lazarus (1866–1932), Australian politician
- Daniel Barnz, American screenwriter
- Daniel Baron, American winemaker
- Daniel Barone (born 1965), Argentine film and television director
- Daniel Barone (baseball) (born 1983), American baseball player
- Daniel Baroni (born 1980), Brazilian footballer
- Daniel Barrera, multiple people
- Daniel Barret (1952–2009), Uruguayan sociologist, journalist, and anarchist
- Daniel Barrett, several people
- Daniel Barringer, multiple people
- Daniel Barrish (born 2000), South African chess player
- Daniel Barritt (born 1980), British rally co-driver
- Daniel R. Barrone, American politician
- Daniel Barry, multiple people
- Daniel Bartholomew-Poyser, Canadian orchestral conductor
- Daniel Bartl (born 1989), Czech football player
- Daniel Bartlett, multiple people
- Daniel Bartolotta (born 1955), Uruguayan footballer
- Daniel Barton (footballer) (born 2005), English footballer
- Daniel Barwick (born 1968), American author, journalist, and podcaster
- Daniel Bärwolf (born 1973), German footballer
- Daniel Bashta (born 1982), American singer
- Daniel Bassi (born 2004), Norwegian footballer
- Daniel Baston (born 1973), Romanian footballer
- Daniel Batalha Henriques (1966–2022), Portuguese Roman Catholic prelate
- Daniel Batcheldor, Anglo-American astrophysicist
- Daniel Bateman Cutter (1808–1889), American physician
- Daniel Bates (born 1941), American anthropologist
- Daniel Moore Bates (1821–1879), American lawyer
- Daniel Batista Lima (born 1964), Greek footballer
- Daniel Batman (1981–2012), Australian sprinter
- Daniel Batson (born 1943), American social psychologist
- Daniel Battsek, British film producer
- Daniel Batz (born 1991), German footballer
- Daniel Baud-Bovy (1870–1958), Swiss writer
- Daniel Bauer, multiple people
- Daniel A. Baugh (1931–2024), American historian
- Daniel Baul (born 1996), Papua New Guinean sprinter
- Daniel Baur (born 1999), Scottish footballer
- Daniel Bautista (born 1952), Mexican athlete
- Daniel Bayne (1730–1769), Scottish merchant and trader
- Daniel H. Bays (1942–2019), American historian
- Daniel Bazán Vera (born 1973), Argentine footballer
- Daniel Beak (1891–1967), British Army officer and an English recipient of the Victoria Cross
- Daniel Beale (field hockey) (born 1993), Australian field hockey player
- Daniel Beard, multiple people
- Daniel Beaty (born 1975), American musical artist
- D. D. Beauchamp (1908–1969), American screenwriter
- Daniel de Beaufort, multiple people
- Daniel Bechtel (1840–1907), American politician
- Daniel Becke (born 1978), German cyclist
- Daniel Beckmann (born 1980), German organist
- Daniel Bedemi (born 1988), Nigerian footballer
- Daniel Bedingfield (born 1979), New Zealand-British singer, songwriter, and actor
- Daniel Bednárik (born 1994), Slovak footballer
- Daniel Bedoya (born 1994), Colombian footballer
- Daniel H. Beekman (1874–1951), American attorney, banker, and politician
- Daniel Beer, British historian
- Daniel Bego (born 1989), Malaysian swimmer
- Daniel Béguin (born 1951), French politician
- Daniel Behle, German opera singer
- Daniel Beichler (born 1988), Austrian footballer
- Daniel V. Beiser, American politician
- Daniel Bek-Pirumian (1861–1922), Armenian military commander
- Daniel Bekele (born 1967), Ethiopian lawyer and human rights activist
- Daniel Bekker (1932–2009), South African boxer
- Daniel Adzei Bekoe (1928–2020), Ghanaian chemist and academic
- Daniel Bekono (born 1978), Cameroonian footballer
- Daniel Béland, Canadian figure skater
- Daniel Béland (sociologist), Canadian political sociologist
- Daniel Bélanger (born 1961), Canadian singer-songwriter
- Daniel Belardinelli (born 1961), American painter
- Daniel Belcher, American operatic baritone
- Daniel Bell, multiple people
- Daniel Bellamy, multiple people
- Daniel Bellemare, Canadian prosecutor
- Daniel Bellemare (figure skater) (born 1980), Canadian figure skater
- Daniel Belli (born 1963), Canadian sports shooter
- Daniel Belling (born 1986), German politician
- Daniel Bellinger (born 2000), American football player
- Daniel Bellissimo (born 1984), Canadian-born Italian ice hockey player
- Daniel W. Belsky is an American epidemiologist and researcher
- Daniel Belton, New Zealand dancer, choreographer, and filmmaker
- Daniel Beltrá, American photojournalist
- Daniel Beltrame (born 1975), Australian soccer player
- Daniel Ben-Ami, British journalist
- Daniel Ben-Horin (born 1947), American political activist
- Daniel Ben-Simon (born 1954), Israeli journalist and politician
- Daniel Beneš (born 1970), Czech businessman
- Daniel Benítez, multiple people
- Daniel Benjamin (born 1961), American diplomat and journalist
- Daniel Benlulu (born 1958), Israeli politician
- Daniel Benmergui, Argentinian independent video game designer
- Daniel Bennequin (born 1952), French mathematician
- Daniel Bennett, multiple people
- Daniel Bennie (born 2006), Australian soccer player
- Daniel Bensaïd (1946–2010), French philosopher
- Daniel R. Benson (born 1975), American Democratic Party politician
- Daniel Bentley, multiple people
- Daniel Benyamini, Israeli violist
- Daniel Benzali (born 1946), Brazilian-born American actor
- Daniel Benzar (born 1997), Romanian footballer
- Dániel Bereczki (born 1995), Hungarian footballer
- Daniel Berehulak, Australian photographer and photojournalist
- Daniel Beren (1929–2014), American politician
- Daniel Beretta (1946–2024), retired French voice actor
- Daniël van den Berg (born 1991), Dutch politician
- Daniel Berg, multiple people
- Daniel Berger, multiple people
- Daniel Bergey (1881–1950), French priest and politician
- Daniel Bergstrand (born 1974), Swedish record producer
- Daniel Berlin (born 1987), Swedish bandy player
- Daniel Berlyne (1924–1976), American psychologist and philosopher
- Daniel Bermúdez, Colombian architect
- Daniel Bernard, multiple people
- Daniel Bernardi (born 1964), American media scholar
- Daniel Bernasconi (born 1973), British yacht designer
- Daniel Bernhardsson (born 1978), Swedish footballer
- Daniel Bernhardt, multiple people
- Daniel Bernhofen, American academic
- Daniel Bernmar (born 1982), Swedish politician
- Daniel Bernoulli, (1700–1782), Dutch-Swiss mathematician
- Daniel Bernstein, American video game composer
- Daniel J. Bernstein (born 1971), American mathematician, cryptologist, and computer scientist
- Daniel J. Bernstein (businessman) (1918–1970), American businessman and liberal political activist
- Daniel Berntsen (born 1993), Norwegian footballer
- Daniel Berridge, British trampoline gymnast
- Daniel Berrigan (1921–2016), American Catholic priest
- Daniel Berta (born 1992), Swedish tennis player
- Daniel Bertaux (born 1939), French sociologist
- Daniel Berthiaume (singer-songwriter), Canadian musician
- Daniel Berthiaume (born 1966), Canadian ice hockey player
- Daniel Bertoni (born 1955), Argentine footballer
- Daniel Bertoya (born 1975), Argentine footballer
- Dániel Berzsenyi (1776–1836), Hungarian writer
- Daniel Bess (born 1977), American television and film actor
- Daniel Bessa (born 1993), Brazilian football player
- Daniel Best (1838–1923), American businessman and adventurer
- Daniel Betancourth, Ecuadorian singer
- Daniel Betancur (born 1995), Colombian archer
- Daniel Bethell (born 1996), English para-badminton player
- Daniel Bethlehem (born 1960), English barrister and legal advisor
- Daniel Bettermann (born 1980), German politician
- Daniel Betti (born 1978), Italian boxer
- Daniel Betts (born 1971), British actor
- Daniel Betts Jr. (1699–1783), American politician
- Daniël Beukers (born 2004), Dutch footballer
- Daniël George van Beuningen (1877–1955), Dutch businessman
- Daniel Bezziccheri (born 1998), Italian football player
- Daniel Bianchi (1962–2025), Uruguayan politician
- Daniel Bibi Biziwu (born 2001), French rugby union player
- Daniel Bichlmann (born 1988), German cyclist
- Daniel D. Bidwell (1819–1864), Union Army general
- Daniel P. Biebuyck (1925–2019), Belgian art historian
- Daniel Biedermann (born 1993), Austrian racing cyclist
- Daniel Bielica (born 1999), Polish footballer
- Daniel Bierofka (born 1979), German football player and midfielder
- Daniel Bigel (born 1965), American film producer
- Daniel Bigelow (1824–1905), American politician
- Daniel Folger Bigelow (1823–1910), American painter
- Daniel Bigham (born 1991), British cyclist
- Daniel Biksadský (born 1978), Slovak sprint canoer
- Daniel Bilalian (1947–2025), French journalist
- Daniel Biles (born 1952), American judge
- Daniel Ernst Bille (1711–1790), Royal Dano-Norwegian Navy officer
- Daniel Bilos (born 1980), Argentine footballer
- Daniel Biran Bayor, Israeli diplomat
- Daniel W. Bird Jr. (born 1938), American attorney and politician
- Daniel Birgmark (born 1973), Swedish sailor
- Daniel Bîrligea (born 2000), Romanian footballer
- Daniel Birnbaum (born 1963), Swedish art curator and critic
- Daniel Birrell (born 2000), Jersey cricketer
- Daniel Birt (1907–1955), English film director and editor
- Daniel Bîrzu (born 2002), Romanian footballer
- Daniel S. Biser (1801–1877), American politician
- Daniel Bishop, multiple people
- Daniel Bisogno (1973–2025), Mexican television presenter
- Daniel Bispo (born 1974), Brazilian boxer
- Daniel Biss (born 1977), American mathematician
- Daniel Bissell, multiple people
- Daniel Biveson (born 1976), Swedish snowboarder
- Daníel Bjarnason (born 1979), Icelandic composer and conductor
- Daniel Björkgren (1939–1992), Swedish race walker
- Daniel Björkman (born 1993), Swedish footballer
- Daniel Björnquist (born 1989), Swedish footballer
- Daniel Black (1911–1978), English footballer
- Daniel Blades, Lord Blades (1888–1959), Scottish judge
- Daniel Blaikie (born 1984), Canadian politician
- Daniel Blain (1898–1981), American physician
- Daniel Blaisdell (1762–1833), American politician
- Daniel Blanc-Gonnet (born 1994), American motorcycle racer
- Daniel Blanco, multiple people
- Daniel Blank (born 1962), American convicted serial killer
- Daniel Blatman (born 1953), Israeli historian
- Daniel Blaufuks, Portuguese photographer
- Daniel Bleichenbacher (born 1964), Swiss cryptographer
- Daniël de Blieck, 17th-century Dutch painter
- Daniel D. Blinka, American lawyer
- Daniel W. Bliss, American physicist
- Daniel Bliss (1823–1916), Christian missionary
- Daniel I. Block, Canadian/American Old Testament scholar
- Daniel Block, 19th-century German-American Jewish leader
- Daniël de Blocq van Scheltinga (1903–1962), Dutch Nazi politician
- Daniel Blok (1580–1660), German artist
- Daniel Blomgren (born 1982), Swedish football player
- Daniel J. Bloomberg (1905–1984), American audio engineer
- Daniel Blue, multiple people
- Daniel Bluman (born 1990), Colombian-born Israeli Olympic show jumping rider
- Daniel Blumberg, English musician and composer
- Daniel Blumenthal, multiple people
- Daniel T. Blumstein (born 1964), American ethologist and conservation biologist
- Daniel Blythe, British author
- Daniel Boateng (born 1992), English footballer
- Daniel Boatwright (1930–2012), American politician
- Daniel Boaventura (born 1970), Brazilian actor and singer
- Daniel G. Bobrow (1935–2017), American computer scientist
- Daniel Bocanegra (born 1987), Colombian footballer
- Daniel Bochner (born 1984), Canadian ice hockey player
- Dániel Böde (born 1986), Hungarian footballer
- Daniel Bodi, French historian
- Daniel Boemle (1960–2007), Swiss radio DJ
- Daniel Boéri (born 1944), Monegasque politician
- Daniel Bogado, British-Paraguayan documentary producer and director
- Daniel Bogdan (born 1971), Romanian footballer
- Daniel Bogdanović (born 1980), Maltese footballer
- Daniel Bogden, American attorney
- Daniel Bogusz (born 1974), Polish footballer
- Daniel Boháč (born 1980), Czech ice hockey player
- Daniel Bohan (1941–2016), Canadian prelate
- Daniel Bohane, Irish Gaelic footballer
- Daniel Bohl (born 1994), German footballer
- Daniel Böhm (born 1986), German biathlete
- Daniel Bohnacker (born 1990), German freestyle skier
- Daniel Bois (born 1984), Canadian racing driver
- Daniel Boisserie (born 1946), French politician
- Daniël Boissevain (born 1969), Dutch actor
- Dániel Bolgár, Hungarian marimbist
- Daniel P. Bolger (born 1957), United States Army general
- Daniel I. Bolnick (born 1974), American evolutionary biologist
- Daniel Boloca (born 1998), Italian-Romanian footballer
- Daniel Bolton (1793–1860), English military engineer
- Daniel Böltz (born 1962), Australian-Swiss long-distance runner
- Daniel Boman (born 1974), American politician
- Daniel Bombardieri (born 1985), Italian footballer
- Daniel Bomberg, 16th-century Flemish-Italian painter
- Daniel Bona (born 1969), Romanian professional footballer
- Daniel Bonade (1896–1976), French classical clarinetist and professor of clarinet
- Daniel Bond (1725–1803), English painter
- Daniel Bonevac, American philosopher
- Daniel Bonham (born 1977), American politician
- Daniel Bonjour (born 1981), South African actor
- Daniel Bonn, Dutch physicist
- Daniel Bonventre, American businessman
- Daniel Booko (born 1983), American actor and model
- Daniel Boone, several people
- D. C. Boonzaier (1865–1950), South African cartoon artist
- Daniel J. Boorstin (1914–2004), American historian
- Daniel Borel (born 1950), Swiss businessman
- Daniel B. Borenstein, American psychiatrist
- Daniel Borges (born 1993), Brazilian footballer
- Daniel Borgman, New Zealand film director
- Daniel Borimirov (born 1970), Bulgarian footballer
- Daniel Born (born 1975), German politician
- Daniel Borsuk (born 1978), Canadian plastic surgeon
- Daniel Börtz (born 1943), Swedish composer
- Daniel Borzutzky (born 1974), American poet
- Daniel E. Bosley (born 1953), American politician
- Daniel Botha (born 2001), Australian rugby union player
- Daniel Bottom (1864–1937), English cricketer
- Daniel Bouchard (born 1968), Canadian politician
- Daniel Boucher, multiple people
- Daniel Bouckaert (1894–1965), Belgian equestrian
- Daniel J. Boudreau (born 1947), American judge
- Daniel Boulanger (1922–2014), French novelist, poet, and playwright
- Daniel Boulud (born 1955), French chef and restaurateur
- Daniel Bouman (born 1998), Australian soccer player
- Daniel Bounty (born 2001), Australian Paralympic athlete
- Daniel de Bourg (born 1976), English singer, songwriter, and actor
- Daniel Bourke (1886–1952), Irish Fianna Fáil politician
- Daniel Bourne (born 1955), American poet
- Daniel Bovet (1907–1992), Swiss-born Italian pharmacist
- Daniel Bowden (born 1986), New Zealand rugby union player
- Daniel Bowen, Australian blogger
- Daniel Bowker (born 1987), Australian canoeist
- Daniel Bowles (born 1991), Australian football player
- Daniel Bowling (1899–1973), British boxer
- Daniel Bowry (born 1998), English association football player
- Daniel Boyarin (born 1946), Israeli-American academic and historian of religion
- Daniel Boyd, multiple people
- Daniel Boyle, multiple people
- Daniel Boys (born 1979), British actor and singer
- Daniel Bozhkov (born 1983), Bulgarian footballer
- Daniel Braaten (born 1982), Norwegian footballer
- Daniel Brabant, Canadian baseball player
- Daniel Brabham (1941–2011), American football player
- Daniel Brabin (1913–1975), English High Court judge
- Daniel von der Bracke (born 1992), German footballer
- Daniel Bradaschia (born 1989), Italian footballer
- Daniel Bradford Devore (1860–1956), United States Army general
- Daniel Bradley, multiple people
- Daniel Bradshaw (born 1978), Australian rules footballer
- Daniel Braga (born 1985), Brazilian footballer
- Daniel Bragança (born 1999), Portuguese footballer
- Daniel Bragderyd (born 1991), Swedish actor
- Daniel Bragg (born 1992), Australian footballer
- Daniel Braid (born 1981), New Zealand rugby union player
- Daniel Brailovsky (born 1958), Argentine-Uruguayan footballer
- Daniel Brainard (1812–1866), American surgeon
- Daniel L. Braine (1829–1898), United States Navy admiral
- Daniel Branca (1951–2005), Argentine comic artist
- Daniel Brand (1935–2015), American wrestler
- Daniel Branda (born 1976), Czech professional ice hockey player
- Daniel Brandenstein (born 1943), American astronaut and test pilot
- Daniel Brändle (born 1992), Liechtenstein footballer
- Daniel Brands (born 1987), German tennis player
- Daniel Brandt, German musician
- Daniel Branton (born 1932), American cell biologist
- Daniel J. Brass (1948–2025), American organizational theorist
- Daniel Brat, American neuropathologist
- Daniel Brata (born 1984), Romanian judoka
- Daniel Braun, German author and computer scientist
- Daniel Brauneis (born 1986), Austrian footballer
- Daniel Braut (born 2005), Norwegian footballer
- Daniel Braverman (born 1993), American National Football League player
- Daniel Bravo (born 1963), French association football player
- Daniel Bread (1800–1873), Oneida political and cultural leader
- Daniel Breaker (born 1980), American actor and comedian
- Daniel Breazeale (1945–2023), American philosopher
- Daniel Breck (1788–1871), American politician
- Daniël Breedijk (born 1995), Dutch footballer
- Daniel Breen, multiple people
- Daniel Breitholtz (born 1977), Swedish record producer
- Daniel Brejčák (born 1986), Slovak ice hockey player
- Daniel Brel, French composer, accordionist, and bandoneon player
- Daniel Brélaz (1950–2025), Swiss mathematician and politician
- Daniel Bren, Israeli businessman
- Daniel Brennan, Baron Brennan (born 1942), British lawyer and judge
- Daniel Brenner, American rabbi
- Daniel Brent (1770–1841), American politician and diplomat
- Daniel Bress (born 1979), American judge
- Daniel Breton (born 1962), Canadian politician
- Daniel Brewster (1923–2007), American politician
- Daniel Břežný (born 1977), Czech footballer
- Daniel Briceño, multiple people
- Daniel Brick (1903–1987), Swedish journalist, writer, translator, and editor
- Daniel Brickley (born 1995), American ice hockey player
- Daniel Bridges (died 1984), American murder victim
- Daniel Brière (born 1977), Canadian ice hockey player
- Daniel Brinkmann (born 1986), German footballer
- Daniel Garrison Brinton (1837–1899), American ethnologist
- Daniel Britton (born 1981), English cricketer
- Daniel Brizuela, multiple people
- Daniel Broadbent (born 1990), English footballer
- Daniel Brochu (born 1970), Canadian actor
- Daniel Brocklebank (born 1979), English actor
- Daniel Brodhead, multiple people
- Daniel Brodin (born 1990), Swedish ice hockey player
- Daniel Brodmeier (born 1987), German rifle shooter
- Daniel Brodsky, American real estate developer
- Daniel Broido (1903–1990), Russian-British engineer
- Daniel Bromley (born 1940), American economist
- Daniel Brook, American writer
- Daniel Brooks, several people
- Daniel Brosinski (born 1988), German footballer
- Daniel Brottier (1876–1936), French Roman Catholic priest
- Daniel Brown, several people
- Daniel Browne (born 1979), rugby union player from New Zealand
- Daniel Browne (Irish politician) (1936–2010), Lord Mayor of Dublin 1982–1983
- Daniel Bruce, multiple people
- D. Bruce Goforth, American politician
- Daniel Brückner (born 1981), German footballer
- Daniel Brud (born 1989), Polish footballer
- Daniel Agustín Brue (born 1964), Argentine politician
- Daniël Brüggen (born 1958), Dutch recorder player
- Daniel Brühl (born 1978), German actor
- Daniel Brummel (born 1981), American musician
- Daniel Brunhart (born 1968), Liechtenstein judoka
- Daniel Brunskill (born 1994), American football player
- Daniel Brush (1947–2022), American jewelry artist
- Daniel Brustlein (1904–1996), Alsatian-American illustrator
- Daniel Bryan, multiple people
- Daniel Buadi, Ghanaian educationist and traditional ruler
- Daniel Buballa (born 1990), German footballer
- Daniel Buchanan (mathematician) (1880–1950), Canadian mathematics and astronomy professor
- Daniel Buchholz, German art dealer
- D. Azro A. Buck (1789–1841), American politician
- Daniel Buck (1753–1816), American politician
- Daniel Buck (judge) (1829–1905), American judge
- Daniel Buckley, multiple people
- Daniel Buckroyd, British theatre director
- Daniel Buda (born 1970), Romanian politician
- Dániel Buday (born 1981), Hungarian handball player
- Daniel Budesca (born 2006), Spanish footballer
- Daniel Budiman (born 1983), German television presenter
- Daniel M. Buechlein, Benedictine monk
- Daniel Bueno, multiple people
- Daniel Buess (1976–2016), Swiss drummer, percussion player and sound artist
- Daniel Buitrago (born 1991), Colombian footballer
- Daniel Bukantz (1917–2008), American fencer
- Daniel Bukvich, American composer and musician
- Daniel Bulford, Canadian former police officer
- Daniel Delany Bulger (1865–1930), Irish athlete
- Daniel Bull (born 1980), Australian mountaineer
- Daniel Bullocks (born 1983), American football player
- Daniel Bump, American mathematician
- Daniel Bunk (born 2004), German footballer
- Daniel C. Burbank (born 1961), American astronaut
- Daniel Buren (born 1938), French artist
- Daniel Burges (1873–1946), recipient of the Victoria Cross
- Daniel Burgess, multiple people
- Daniel Burgner (born 1954), U.S.V.I. bobsledder
- Daniel Burka (born 1978), Canadian designer
- Daniel Burke, multiple people
- Daniel Burkett (born 1995), Canadian racing driver
- Daniel Burling (born 1947), American politician
- Daniel Burman (born 1973), Argentine film director and producer
- Daniel Burnap (1759–1838), American clockmaker
- Daniel D. Burnes (1851–1899), American politician
- Daniel B. Burnett Jr. (1905–1976), American airplane wing designer
- Daniel Burnham (1846–1912), American architect and urban designer
- Daniel F. Burnham (1864–1957), American politician
- Daniel M. Burnham (1929–2020), American politician
- Daniel Burnham Jr. (1886–1961), American architect
- Daniel Burr (1811–1885), British Member of Parliament
- Daniel Burrill Ray (1928–1979), American mathematician
- Daniel L. Burrows (1908–1990), American politician
- Daniel Burrows (1766–1858), American politician
- Daniel Burrus, American technology futurist, business adviser, and author
- Daniel W. Bursch (born 1957), American astronaut
- Daniel Burston, psychologist and author
- Daniel Burt, multiple people
- Daniel Burton (born 1963), American bicycle enthusiast
- Daniel Bushnell (1808–1891), American industrialist
- Daniel Bustaffa (born 1956), French international rugby union player
- Daniel Butler, multiple people
- Daniel Bútora, Slovak educator
- Daniel Sabin Butrick (1789–1851), American missionary
- Daniel Butterfield (1831–1901), American businessman, general, and treasurer
- Daniel E. Button (1917–2009), American politician
- Daniel Buxton (born 1977), British racing driver
- Daniel Bambang Dwi Byantoro, Indonesian bishop
- Daniel Byman, American political scientist
- Daniel Byrne, multiple people

== C ==
- Daniel Cabou (1929–2018), Senegalese politician
- Daniel Cabral (born 2002), Brazilian footballer
- Daniel Cabrera (born 1981), Dominican baseball player
- Daniel Cabrera (outfielder) (born 1998), American baseball player
- Daniel Cáceres (born 1982), Paraguayan footballer
- Daniel Cadena (born 1987), Nicaraguan footballer
- Daniel Cady (1773–1859), American judge
- Daniel Caesar (born 1995), Canadian singer and songwriter
- Daniel Caffé (1750–1815), German painter
- Daniel William Cahill (1796–1864), Irish physicist
- Daniel Cahill, American politician
- Daniel Caines (born 1979), British athlete
- Daniel Cajanus, Swedish/Finnish giant
- Daniel Calabretta, American judge
- Daniel Caldwell (1935–2015), American actor and director
- Daniel G. Caldwell (1842–1917), American Civil War soldier
- Daniel Richard Caldwell (1816–1875), British colonial administrator
- Daniel H. Calhoun (1927–2019), American historian
- Daniel Calabretta (born 1978), American judge
- Daniel G. Caldwell (1842–1917), American Civil War soldier
- Daniel Richard Caldwell (1816–1875), British colonial administrator
- Daniel Caligiuri (born 1988), German footballer
- Daniel Callaghan (politician) (1786–1849), Irish politician
- Daniel J. Callaghan (1890-1942), United States Navy admiral
- Daniel Callahan (1930–2019), American bioethicist
- Daniel Callus (1888–1965), Maltese historian and philosopher
- Daniel Calparsoro (born 1968), Spanish film director
- Daniel Caltagirone (born 1972), English actor
- Daniel Caluag (born 1987), Filipino American BMX racer
- Daniel Calveti (born 1977), Venezuelan Christian music singer
- Daniel Calvo (judge) (born c. 1958), Chilean judge
- Daniel Calvo (footballer) (born 1979), Belgian footballer
- Daniel Calvo (1832–1880), Bolivian writer and lawyer
- Daniel Camacho (born 1998), Bolivian footballer
- Daniel Camarena (born 1992), American baseball player
- Daniel Camargo (born 1991), Brazilian ballet dancer
- Daniel Cambridge (1820–1882), Irish Victoria Cross recipient
- Daniel Cambronero (born 1986), Costa Rican footballer
- Daniel Came, British philosopher
- Daniel Camejo (1914–2008), Venezuelan sailor
- Daniel Cameron (American politician) (born 1985), American attorney and politician
- Daniel Alexander Cameron (1870–1937), Canadian politician
- Daniel R. Cameron (1885–1933), Canadian politician
- Daniel Camiade (1940–2020), French rugby player
- Daniel Campbell (Medal of Honor) (1874–1955), United States Army Medal of Honor recipient
- Daniel Campbell (Australian politician) (1812–1875), Australian merchant and politician
- Daniel Campbell (Canadian politician) (1926–1992), Canadian politician
- Daniel Campos-Hull (born 1989), Spanish racing driver
- Daniel Campos (footballer) (born 1981), Chilean footballer
- Daniel Candeias (born 1988), Portuguese footballer
- Daniel Cane, American businessman
- Daniel Cangialosi (born 1971), Argentine footballer
- Daniel Canónico (1916–1975), Venezuelan baseball player
- Daniel Cantillon (born 1945), American fencer
- Daniel Cao (born 2001), Chinese racing driver
- Daniel Capecci (born 1983), American soccer player
- Daniel Fowler Cappell (1900–1976), Scottish physician and pathologist
- Daniel Cappelletti (born 1991), Italian footballer
- Daniel Caprice (born 1989), English rugby union player
- Daniel Cara (born 1978), Brazilian politician
- Daniel Carasso (1905–2009), French businessman
- Daniel Carbonell (born 1991), Cuban baseball player
- Daniel Carcillo (born 1985), Canadian ice hockey player
- Jorge Daniel Cardaccio (born 1959), Uruguayan footballer
- Daniel Cardon de Lichtbuer (1930–2022), Belgian businessman
- Daniel Cardona (1890–1943), Spanish politician
- Daniel Cardoso (born 1989), South African soccer player
- Daniel R. Carey, Massachusetts politician
- Daniel Cargnin (paleontologist) (1930–2002), Brazilian paleontologist
- Daniel Cargnin (judoka) (born 1997), Brazilian judoka
- Daniel Carlat, American psychiatrist
- Daniel Carlin (born 1959), American health care CEO
- Daniel Carlisle (born 1955), American sports shooter
- Daniel Carlson (born 1995), American football player
- Daniel Carlsson (rally driver) (born 1976), Swedish rally driver
- Daniel Carlsson (swimmer) (born 1976), Swedish swimmer
- Daniel Carmick (1773–1816), US Marine Corps officer
- Daniel Carmon (born 1951), Israeli diplomat
- Daniel Carnevali (born 1946), Argentine footballer
- Daniel Carney (1944–1987), Zimbabwean writer
- Daniel J. Caron (born 1957), Canadian librarian and archivist
- Daniel Carou (born 1984), Argentine footballer
- Daniel C. Carpenter (1815–1866), New York City police officer
- Daniel Carpo (born 1984), Romanian rugby union footballer
- Daniel Carr (footballer) (born 1994), Trinidadian footballer
- Daniel Carr (ice hockey) (born 1991), Canadian ice hockey player
- Daniel Carrara (born 1982), Argentine footballer
- Daniel Carriço (born 1988), Portuguese footballer
- Daniel Carrillo (born 1995), Venezuelan footballer
- Daniel Alcides Carrión (1857–1885), Peruvian medical student
- Daniel Carroll (1730–1796), American politician, signed US Constitution
- Daniel Carroll (rugby union) (1892–1956), Australia & US international rugby union player
- Daniel J. Carroll (1874–1927), American politician and businessman
- Daniel Lynn Carroll (1797–1851), American theologian
- Daniel Carter (musician), American free jazz musician
- Daniel Carter (LDS composer) (born 1955), American singer-songwriter
- Daniel P. Carter (born 1972), British musician and radio DJ
- Daniel Cartier (born 1969), American songwriter, singer and actor
- Daniel Carvalho (born 1983), Brazilian footballer and manager
- Daniel Carver, American white supremacist
- Daniel Casaleiro (born 1989), Portuguese footballer
- Daniel Casares, Spanish flamenco guitarist and composer
- Daniel Casas (born 1979), Spanish football manager
- Daniel Casey (born 1972), British actor
- Daniel Casey (screenwriter) (born 1981), American screenwriter
- Daniel Casimir, English musician
- Daniel Caspary (born 1976), German politician
- Daniel Casper (born 2001), American curler
- Daniel Harold Casriel (1924–1983), American psychiatrist
- Daniel E. Cassell (1966–2022), Liberian psychologist, business consultant, and politician
- Daniel Cassiau-Haurie (born 1961), French weightlifter
- Daniel Cassidy (1943–2008), American writer
- Daniel Cassidy (footballer) (1907–1995), English footballer
- Daniel Castano (born 1994), American baseball player
- Daniel Castellani (born 1961), Argentine volleyball player and coach
- Daniel Castillo (born 1990), Chilean footballer
- Daniel Castro, multiple people
- Daniel Catán (1949–2011), Mexican composer and writer
- Daniel Catenacci (born 1993), Canadian-Italian ice hockey player
- Daniel Cates (born 1989), American poker player
- Daniel B. Cathcart (1906–1959), American art director
- Daniel Catovsky (1937–2022), Argentine-born British consultant hematologist
- Daniel Catullo, American film director
- Daniel Cauchy (1930–2020), French actor
- Daniel Caux (1935–2008), French musicologist, essayist, and journalist
- Daniel Cavanagh (born 1972), English musician
- Daniel Cavanagh (politician), American politician
- Daniel Cave (born 1999), Australian swimmer
- Daniel Caverzaschi (born 1993), Spanish wheelchair tennis player
- Daniel Cavia (born 2002), Spanish cyclist
- Daniel Cawdery (born 1982), South African chess player
- Daniel Cawdry, English clergyman
- Daniel Cazés (1939–2012), Mexican anthropologist and gender studies scholar
- Daniel L. Cease, American publisher
- Daniel Ceccaldi (1927–2003), French actor
- Daniel Celea (born 1995), Romanian footballer
- Daniel Celebre, Canadian dancer
- Daniel Celentano (1902–1980), American painter
- Daniel Ceppi (1951–2024), Swiss comics artist
- Daniel Cere, Canadian professor
- Daniel Cerisey (born 1948), French cross-country skier
- Daniel Cerny (born 1981), American actor
- Daniel Cerone, American television writer
- Daniel Cervantes (born 1990), Mexican footballer
- Daniel Chabrera (1992–2021), Spanish football coach
- Daniel Chabrun (1925–2006), French conductor
- Daniel Chacón, multiple people
- Daniel Chadwick (1825–1884), American attorney
- Daniel Alberto Chafer (born 1981), Argentine footballer
- Daniel Chalifour (born 1971), Canadian Paralympic cyclist
- Daniel Chalonge (1895–1977), French astronomer and astrophysicist
- Daniel Chamale (born 1993), Canadian soccer player
- Daniel Chamberlain, multiple people
- Daniel Chamier (1565–1621), French Protestant theologian
- Daniel Chamovitz (born 1963), American-Israeli biologist and author
- Daniel Champagne (born 1969), Canadian politician
- Daniel Champlin (1769–1832), justice of the Rhode Island Supreme Court
- Daniel Chan (born 1975), Hong Kong singer and actor
- Daniel Chan (born 1985), Hong Kong Para-badminton player
- Daniel Chan Chi-pun (1957–1995), Hong Konger and drug trafficker
- Daniel Chandler, British visual semiotician
- Daniel Chandler (wrestler) (born 1951), American wrestler
- Daniel Chanis Pinzón (1892–1961), Panamanian politician and physician
- Daniel Ahmling Chapman Nyaho (1909–2001), Ghanaian academic and diplomat
- Daniel Chapo (born 1977), Mozambican politician, lawyer, and jurist
- Daniel Charles (1935–2008), French musician, musicologist, and philosopher
- Daniel Charles-Alfred (1934–2020), French footballer
- Daniel Charles Grose (1832–1900), American painter
- Daniel Charney (1888–1959), Yiddish poet and journalist
- Daniel Chasquetti (born 1964), Uruguayan political scientist
- Daniel Chatto (born 1957), British artist and actor
- Daniel Chavarría (1933–2018), Uruguayan revolutionary and writer
- Daniel Chávez, multiple people
- Daniel Kipkorir Chepyegon (born 1986), Ugandan marathon runner
- Daniel Cherniavsky (born 1933), Argentine filmmaker
- Daniel Chesters (born 2002), English footballer
- Daniel D. Chetti, Italian theologian
- D. G. Chichester (born 1964), American comic book writer
- Daniel Chick (born 1976), Australian rules footballer
- Daniel Chidiac, Australian writer
- Daniel Chigou (born 1983), Cameroonian footballer
- Daniel Childs (born 1988), South African cricketer
- Daniel Chillingworth (born 1981), English footballer
- Daniel Chipman (1765–1850), American politician
- Daniel Chiriac (born 1973), Romanian rugby union player
- Daniel Chiriță (born 1974), Romanian professional footballer
- Daniel Chirot (born 1942), American writer and academic
- Daniel Black Chisholm (1832–1898), Canadian politician
- Daniel Chislov (born 1995), Israeli badminton player
- Daniel Chițoiu (born 1967), Romanian economist
- Daniel Chitsulo (born 1983), Malawian footballer
- Daniel Chodowiecki (1726–1801), German painter and printmaker
- Daniel Chong (born 1978), American filmmaker
- Daniel Chongolo (born 1978), Tanzanian politician
- Daniel Chonkadze (1830–1860), Georgian writer
- Daniel Chopra (born 1973), Swedish professional golfer
- Daniel Chorzempa (1944–2023), American organist
- Daniel C. K. Chow, American legal scholar
- Daniel Christensen (born 1978), Danish footballer
- Daniel Christmas (born 1956), Canadian senator
- Daniel Chima Chukwu (born 1991), Nigerian footballer
- Daniel Chun, Korean-American comedy writer
- Daniel Chwolson (1819–1911), Russian-Jewish scholar
- Daniel Ciach (born 1990), Polish footballer
- Daniel Ciampini (born 1990), Canadian professional ice hockey player
- Daniel Ciechański (born 1995), Polish footballer
- Daniel Cifuentes (born 1999), Colombian footballer
- Daniel Cigogna (born 1982), Argentine footballer
- Daniel Cingolani (born 1961), Argentine racing driver
- Daniel Ciobanu (born 1993), Romanian footballer
- Daniel Ciobotea (born 1951), Romanian Orthodox patriarch
- Daniel Ciofani (born 1985), Italian footballer
- Daniel Cisneros (born 1992), Mexican footballer
- Daniel Ciucă (born 1966), Romanian footballer
- Daniel Ciugureanu (1885–1950), Moldovan-Romanian politician
- Daniel Claffey (1869–1924), New Zealand cricketer
- Daniel Clarembaux (1883–1928), Belgian rower
- Daniel Clark, multiple people
- Daniel Clarkson, British comedy actor and playwright
- Daniel Clasen, German political theorist, religious scholar, and classicist
- Daniel Claudon (born 1943), French biathlete
- Daniel Claus (1727–1787), American Indian agent
- Daniel Clausner (born 1985), German Paralympic swimmer
- Daniel Clavero (born 1968), Spanish cyclist
- Daniel Bragg Clayton (1817–1906), American universalist minister
- Daniel Cleary (born 1978), Canadian ice hockey player
- Daniel Cleary (footballer) (born 1996), Irish professional footballer
- Daniel Hayyim Cleif (1729–1794), Dutch-born Curonian rabbi
- Daniel Webster Clendenan, Canadian politician
- Daniël de Clercq (1854–1931), Dutch socialist and activist
- Daniel Clérice (1912–1990), French actor
- Daniel Cleveland (1838–1929), American lawyer, politician, and botanist
- Daniel Clifford, multiple people
- Daniel Clitnovici (born 1982), Australian soccer coach
- Daniel Clowes (born 1961), American cartoonist, graphic novelist, and illustrator
- Daniel Webster Cluff (1916–1989), United States Coast Guard officer
- Daniel A. Clune, American ambassador
- Daniel Clyne (1879–1965), Australian politician
- Daniel Cnossen (born 1980), American biathlete and cross-country skier
- Daniel Coakley, multiple people
- Daniel Coats, multiple people
- Daniel L. Coberly (born 1954), American author
- Daniel Cockburn, Canadian filmmaker and performer
- Daniel Coelho (born 1978), Brazilian politician
- Daniel Coghlan (1812–1877), American politician
- Daniel Cohalan, multiple people
- Daniel Cohen, several people
- Daniel Cohn-Bendit (born 1945), French-German politician
- Daniel Cojocaru (born 1969), Romanian sprinter
- Daniel Coke (1745–1825), English politician and lawyer
- Daniel Coker, African-American bishop and missionary
- Daniel Cole, multiple people
- Daniel Clement Colesworthy (1810–1893), American poet
- Daniel Colin (1933–2019), French politician
- Daniel Colindres (born 1985), Costa Rican footballer
- Daniel Coll, British actor
- Daniel Colla (born 1964), Argentine volleyball player
- Daniel Colliard (1930–2022), French politician
- Daniel Collingwood (c. 1634–1681), English soldier and politician
- Daniel Collins, several people
- Daniel Collopy (born 1978), Australian actor
- Daniel Colón-Ramos, Puerto Rican neuroscientist
- Daniel Colson (1943–2026), French sociologist and academic
- Daniel Colwall, English merchant and philosopher
- Daniel Comeaux (born 1969), American federal agent
- Daniel Compton (1915–1990), Canadian politician
- Daniel Comstock, multiple people
- Daniel Conahan (born 1954), American convicted murderer and rapist
- Daniel Keen Congdon (1836–1907), Australian politician
- Daniel Congré (born 1985), French footballer
- Daniel F. Conley, American lawyer
- Daniel Conn (born 1986), Australian rugby league footballer
- Daniel Connell (born 1970), Australian artist
- Daniel Connell (comedian), Australian comedian
- Daniel W. Connolly (1847–1894), American politician
- Daniel Connor, multiple people
- Daniel Connors (born 1988), Australian rules footballer
- Daniel Conover (1822–1896), American public servant, political activist, and industrialist
- Daniel Conrad (born 1946), American painter
- Daniel Constantin, multiple people
- Daniel Contet (1943–2018), French tennis player
- Daniel Cook, multiple people
- Daniel Coonan (born 1973), British actor
- Daniel Cooper, multiple people
- Daniel Coppin, English painter
- Daniel William Coquillett (1856–1911), American entomologist
- Daniel Corbett, British broadcast meteorologist
- Daniel Corcino (born 1990), Dominican baseball player
- Daniel Cordaro, American psychologist
- Daniel Cordier (1920–2020), French resistant fighter, author and art dealer
- Daniel Cordier (footballer) (1942–2024), French footballer
- Daniel Cordone (born 1974), Argentine footballer
- Daniel Corkery, multiple people
- Daniel Cormier (born 1979), American wrestler and mixed martial arts fighter
- Daniel Coronell (born 1964), Colombian director of Noticias Uno
- Daniel Corral (born 1990), Mexican gymnast
- Daniel Corral (composer), American composer and musician
- Daniel Correa (1994–2018), Brazilian footballer
- Daniel Corrie (1777–1837), English Anglican priest and bishop
- Daniel Corrigan (1900–1994), American Anglican priest
- Daniel Corso (born 1978), Canadian ice hockey player
- Daniel Lee Corwin (1958–1998), American serial killer
- Daniel Cosgrove (born 1970), American actor
- Daniel Cosgrove (biologist), American biologist and author
- Daniel Cosío Villegas (1898–1976), Mexican economist, essayist, historian and diplomat
- Daniel Costa, multiple people
- Daniel Costantini (born 1943), French handball player
- Daniel Costescu (born 1976), Romanian footballer
- Daniel Cottier (1838–1891), Scottish artist
- Daniel Cotton (born 1988), English footballer
- Daniel Coughlan, multiple people
- Daniel Coughlin (born 1934), American politician
- Daniel P. Coughlin (author), American screenwriter
- Daniel de Rémy de Courcelle (1626–1698), Canadian politician
- Daniel Courcol (born 1969), French tennis player
- Daniel Cousin (born 1977), Gabonese footballer
- Daniel Covell, American politician
- Daniel Coxe IV, American politician
- Daniel Coyle (born 1994), Irish show jumping rider
- Daniel D. Crabtree (born 1956), American judge
- Daniel Steven Crafts (born 1949), American composer
- Daniel Craig (born 1968), English actor
- Daniel Frank Craig (1875–1929), United States Army officer
- Daniel Cramer (1568–1637), German theologian and writer
- Daniel J. Creedon (1914–1982), American politician
- Daniel Cremers, German computer scientist
- Daniel Cremieux (1938–2025), French fashion designer
- Daniel Crevier, Canadian academic
- Daniel Crichton (born 1985), New Zealand-born Samoan rugby union player
- Daniel Crilly (1857–1923), British politician and journalist
- Daniel Crisostomo (born 1997), American soccer player
- Daniel Richard Crissinger (1860–1942), American lawyer and banker
- Daniel Crista (born 1991), Romanian cyclist
- Daniel Cristescu (born 1987), Romanian footballer
- Daniel W. Crofts, American historian
- Daniel Croner, Transylvanian composer and organist
- Daniel Cronin, multiple people
- Daniel Cronström (1655–1719), Swedish architect
- Daniel Cross, multiple people
- Daniel J. Crothers (born 1957), American judge
- Daniel Crowley, multiple people
- Daniel Crozier, American composer and academic
- Daniel Cruger (1780–1843), American politician
- Daniel Cruz, multiple people
- Dániel Csóka (born 2000), Hungarian association football player
- Daniel Cudmore (born 1981), Canadian actor and stuntman
- Daniel Cudmore (businessman) (1811–1891), Australian pastoralist
- Daniel Cuevas (born 1993), American professional soccer player
- Daniel Cukierman (born 1995), Israeli tennis player
- Daniel Cullen (New South Wales cricketer) (1889–1971), Australian cricketer
- Daniel Wallace Culp (1852–1918), American doctor, pastor, and educator
- Daniel Cumming (born 1960), Australian wrestler
- Daniel Cummings (born 2006), Scottish footballer
- Daniel Cunliffe (1801–1871), British artist
- Daniel John Cunningham (1850–1909), Scottish physician
- Daniel Curdie (1810–1884), Australian medical doctor
- Daniel Curley (1918–1988), American writer
- Daniel Joseph Curley (1869–1932), American Catholic bishop
- Daniel Currie (born 1989), Australian rules footballer
- Daniel A. Currie (1842–1911), American politician
- Daniel Curtil, French slalom canoeist
- Daniel Curtin, multiple people
- Daniel Curtis, multiple people
- Daniel Curzon (born 1938), American dramatist
- Daniel Parke Custis (1711–1757), American planter and politician
- Daniel Cuthbert (1846–1912), Australian cricketer
- Daniel Cyganowski (1921–1983), American bishop
- Daniel Czapliński, Polish noble

== D ==
- Daniel Da Ponte (born 1978), American politician
- Daniel Da Prato (born 1981), American football coach
- Daniel Dąbrowski (born 1983), Polish sprinter
- Daniel Daga (born 2007), Nigerian football player
- Daniel Dagallier (1926–2025), French fencer
- Daniel Dagan, Israeli journalist and author
- Daniel O. Dahlstrom, American philosopher
- Daniel Dahm, German geographer
- Daniel Dăianu (born 1952), Romanian politician and economist
- Daniel Daigle (born 1939), Canadian politician
- Daniel Daikawa (born 1971), American-born Japanese ice hockey player
- Daniel A. Dailey (born 1969), United States Army soldier
- Daniel Daio, Prime Minister of São Tomé and Príncipe
- Daniel Dal Bo (born 1987), Argentine sprint canoeist
- Daniel Dale, Canadian journalist
- Daniel Dalgleish, Australian politician
- Daniel Dalton, multiple people
- Daniel Daly (1873–1937), United States Marine Corps Medal of Honor
- Daniel Dana (1771–1859), American academic administrator
- Daniel Dăncuță (born 1971), Romanian boxer
- Daniel Daneshvar (born 1983), American neuroscientist, brain injury physician, and physiatrist
- Daniel Daney (1905–1985), French boxer
- Daniel Danielis (1635–1696), Belgian composer
- Daniel A. D'Aniello (born 1946), American businessman
- Daniel Danielopolu (1884–1955), Romanian physiologist and therapist
- Daniel Jacob Danielsen (1871–1916), Danish-born Faroese Open Brethren missionary, marine engineer and humanitarian
- Daniel Cornelius Danielssen (1815–1894), Norwegian dermatologist
- Daniel Danilović (born 1988), Montenegrin-Swedish tennis player
- Daniel Danis (born 1962), Canadian playwright
- Daniel Danis (film director), South Sudanese film director
- Daniel Danklmaier (born 1993), Austrian alpine skier
- Daniel Dantas, multiple people
- Daniel Danu (born 2002), Moldovan footballer
- Daniel Daperis, Australian actor and director
- Daniel Dappa (born 2007), Israeli association footballer
- Daniel Darc (1959–2013), French singer
- Daniel Dardha (born 2005), Belgian chess grandmaster
- Daniel Ohene Darko (born 1961), Ghanaian politician
- Daniel C. Darrow (1895–1965), American pediatrician and clinical biochemist
- Daniel Dart, American singer
- Daniel Davari (born 1988), Iranian footballer
- Daniel David, several people
- Daniel Davidsen (born 1978), Danish-Norwegian guitarist
- Daniel Davidson (born 1981), American baseball player
- Daniel Davidsson (born 1983), Swedish speedway rider
- Daniel DeWitt Tompkins Davie (1816–1877), American photographer
- Daniel Davies, multiple people
- Daniel Davis, multiple people
- Daniel Davison (born 1983), American drummer
- Daniel P. Davison (1925–2010), American banker
- Daniel E. Dawes, American public health servant
- Daniel Dawson (born 1977), Australian boxer
- Daniel Day, multiple people
- Daniel Day-Lewis (born 1957), English retired actor
- Daniel Dayan (born 1943), French social scientist
- Daniël De Cubber (born 1954), Belgian footballer
- Daniel De Leon (1852–1914), Curaçao-born American trade union organizer
- Daniel De Luce (1911–2002), American journalist
- Daniel Dean (athlete) (1909–2004), American long-distance runner
- Daniel Dearing (born 1990), Canadian beach volleyball player
- Daniel Decker, Puerto Rican composer
- Daniël Deen (born 2003), Dutch footballer
- Daniel Defert (1937–2023), French sociologist and HIV/AIDS activist
- Daniel Deffayet (1922–2002), French classical saxophonist
- Daniel Defoe, English writer, journalist, and pamphleteer
- Daniel Dehesa Mora (born 1950), Mexican politician
- Daniël Dekker (born 1960), Dutch disc jockey and radio host
- Daniel Delamare (born 1954), French businessman
- Daniel Delander (died 1733), British clockmaker
- Daniel Delaney, American restaurateur
- Daniel Delany (1747–1814), Irish bishop
- Daniel Delaveau (born 1952), French politician
- Daniel Delfino (born 1970), Argentine footballer
- Daniel Delgadillo, multiple people
- Daniel Delgado (died 2021), Panamanian politician
- Daniel Dencik, Danish writer and film director
- Daniel Deng Bul (born 1950), South Sudanese Episcopalian bishop
- Daniel Deniehy (1828–1865), Australian politician
- Daniel Denison, multiple people
- Daniel Dennett (1942–2024), American philosopher
- Daniel Dennis (born 1986), American freestyle wrestler
- Daniel Denoon (born 2004), Swiss footballer
- Daniel Denot (born 1993), Argentine footballer
- Daniel Derbyshire (1846–1916), Canadian politician
- Daniel Deribe (born 1983), Ethiopian footballer
- Daniel Deronda Berolzheimer (1877–1952), American philatelist
- Daniel DeSanto (born 1980), Canadian voice actor
- Daniel Descalso (born 1986), American baseball player
- Daniel DeShaime (born 1946), Canadian singer
- Daniel Desmond, multiple people
- Daniel Desnoyers (born 1960), Canadian DJ
- Daniel Deudney (born 1953), American political scientist
- Daniel Deusser (born 1981), German equestrian
- Daniel Devereux, American philosopher
- Daniel Devine, multiple people
- Daniel Dewey (1766–1815), American politician
- Daniel Dezeuze, French painter
- Daniel Dhakidae (1945–2021), Indonesian intellectual
- Daniel Dhers (born 1985), Venezuelan bicycle motocross rider
- Daniel Di Tomasso (born 1983), Canadian actor and model
- Daniel Dias (born 1988), Brazilian Paralympic swimmer
- Daniel Diaz, several people
- Daniel A. DiBiasio, American academic administrator
- Daniel Dicker (born 1995), Austrian handball player
- Daniel Dickinson, multiple people
- Daniel Didavi (born 1990), German footballer
- Daniel Didech, American politician
- Daniel Diehl (born 2005), American swimmer
- Daniel Diemer (born 1996), Canadian actor
- Daniel Diermeier (born 1965), American economist
- Daniel Diges (born 1981), Spanish musician and actor
- Daniel Carroll Digges, American politician
- Daniel J. Dill (1830–1917), American politician
- Daniel Dillon, multiple people
- Daniel DiLorenzo, American inventor and physical scientist
- Daniel DiMaggio (born 2003), American actor
- Daniel DiMauro, American documentary filmmaker
- Daniel Dimov (born 1989), Bulgarian professional footballer
- Daniel J. Dinan (1929–2015), American judge
- Daniel DiNardo (born 1949), American Roman Catholic prelate
- Daniel Dines (born 1972), Romanian entrepreneur
- Daniel Dingel (1928–2010), Filipino inventor
- Daniel Dion (1958–2014), Canadian artist
- Daniel Divet (born 1966), French rugby league player
- Daniel Divinsky (1942–2025), Argentinian lawyer and politician
- Daniel Dixon, multiple people
- Daniel Djakiew, Australian academic
- Daniel Djamo (born 1987), Romanian artist and filmmaker
- Daniel Dlodlo (born 1952), South African judge
- Daniel Doan (1914–1993), American novelist
- Daniel W. Dobberpuhl (1945–2019), American electrical engineer
- Daniel Dobrovoljski (born 1975), Russian footballer
- Daniel Dociu, Romanian video game artist
- Daniel Martin Dockx (born 1974), Spanish equestrian
- Daniel L. Doctoroff (born 1958), American businessman
- Daniel Dodd, English painter and engraver
- Daniel Dodds (born 2001), English footballer
- Daniel Doheny (born 1997), Canadian actor
- Daniel Doherty, American graffiti artist
- Daniel Dolan (1951–2022), American Sedevacantist bishop
- Daniel Dole (1808–1878), missionary
- Daniel Dolejš (born 1994), Czech ice hockey player
- Daniel Dolenc (born 1993), Finnish basketball player
- Daniel Dölschner (born 1976), German poet and Haiku-writer
- Daniel Dombrowski, American philosopher
- Daniel D. Domenico, American judge
- Daniel R. Domínguez (born 1945), Puerto Rican judge
- Daniel Domscheit-Berg, German activist
- Daniel Donahue (1923–2015), American businessman
- Daniel Donati (born 1977), Australian rules footballer
- Daniel Donato (born 1995), American guitarist and singer
- Daniel Smith Donelson (1801–1863), Confederate Army general
- Daniel Donne, English jurist
- Daniel Doody, Australian reporter and television presenter
- Daniel Doom (1934–2020), Belgian cyclist
- Daniel Dor, Israeli linguist
- Daniel Dorall, Malaysian-Australian sculptor
- Daniel Doram (born 1997), St. Maarten cricketer
- Daniel Doran, multiple people
- Daniel Doré (born 1970), Canadian ice hockey player
- Daniel Dorff (born 1956), American composer
- Daniel Döringer (born 1991), German footballer
- Daniel Doron (1929–2022), Israeli economist
- Daniel G. Dorrance (1811–1896), American politician
- Dániel Dósa (born 1996), Hungarian fencer
- Daniel Dohou Dossou (born 1959), Beninese judoka
- Daniel Dow, Scottish musician and composer
- Daniel Downs (1824–1897), American politician
- Daniel Drache, Canadian political scientist
- Daniel B. Drachman (1932–2022), American neurologist
- Daniel Drake (1785–1852), American journalist
- Daniel Draper (1940–2004), American attorney and politician
- Daniel Draper (meteorologist) (1841–1931), American meteorologist
- Daniel Drawbaugh, American purported inventor
- Daniel Dreisbach, American author, academic and attorney
- Daniel Drepaul (born 1975), English cricketer
- Daniel Drescher (born 1989), Austrian footballer
- Daniel Drew, multiple people
- Daniel Drezet (born 1952), French cross-country skier
- Daniel W. Drezner (born 1968), American journalist
- Daniel Drezner, American political scientist and author
- Daniel Driscoll, multiple people
- Daniel Dromm (born 1955), American politician
- Daniel Droste (born 1980), German musician
- Daniel Drucker, multiple people
- Daniel Duarte, multiple people
- Daniel Dubiecki (born 1977), American film producer
- Daniel Dubois, multiple people
- Daniel Dubroca (born 1954), French rugby union player
- Daniel Ducarme (1954–2010), Belgian politician
- Daniel Duchovny, American TV and film director
- Daniel Ducreux (born 1947), French cyclist
- Daniel Ducruet (born 1964), Monegasque noble
- Daniel Dudas (born 1994), Hungarian swimmer
- Daniel Duffy (1929–2004), Scottish trade unionist
- Daniel Dugléry (born 1946), French politician
- Daniel Dugué (1912–1987), French mathematician
- Daniel Dujshebaev (born 1997), Spanish handball player
- Daniel Dulany, multiple people
- Daniel Dumaresq (1712–1805), Jersey academic and priest
- Daniel Dumas (born 1983), Australian rugby league footballer
- Daniel Dumbrăvanu (born 2001), Moldovan footballer
- Daniel Dumile (1971–2020), British-American rapper and beatmaker known as MF Doom
- Daniel Dumitrescu (born 1968), Romanian boxer
- Daniel Dumitru, American physiatrist
- Daniel Dumonstier (1574–1646), French artist
- Daniel Dunakin (1810–1875), American politician
- Daniel Duncan, multiple people
- Daniel Dunklin (1790–1844), American politician
- Daniel Nicol Dunlop (1868–1935), Scottish entrepreneur
- Daniel Dunst (born 1984), Austrian footballer
- Daniel Dupjačanec (born 1983), Macedonian handball player
- Daniel Dupont (born 1945), Belgian field hockey player
- Daniël Dupré (1751–1817), Dutch engraver, painter, draftsman, and watercolorist
- Daniel Dupuy (1719–1807), American silversmith
- Daniel Durant (born 1989), American actor
- Daniel Duranti (1633–1712), Italian Catholic priest
- Daniel Durben (born 1959), American sports shooter
- Daniel M. Durell (1769–1841), American politician
- Daniel Dutton, American classical composer
- Daniel Dutuel (born 1967), French footballer
- Daniel Duval (1944–2013), French actor and film director
- Daniel Dvoress (born 1988), Canadian poker player
- Daniel W. Dwyer (born 1966), United States Navy admiral
- Daniel Dwyer (1871–1942), Australian politician
- Daniel van den Dyck, Flemish painter
- Daniel Dye (born 2003), American racing driver
- Daniel Dykhuizen (born 1942), American ecologist
- Daniel Dyulgerov (born 1988), Bulgarian footballer
- Daniel Dziwniel (born 1992), Polish footballer
- Daniel Dzufer (born 1988), Australian rules footballer
- Daniel Dzurek, American geographer

== E ==
- Daniel S. Earhart (1907–1976), American politician
- Daniel Eaton, multiple people
- Daniel Ebenyo (born 1995), Kenyan athlete
- Daniel Eberlin, German Baroque composer
- Daniel Eckenspieller (1931–2023), French politician
- Daniel C. Eddy (1823–1896), American politician
- Daniel Edelman, multiple people
- Daniel Edelstyn, British filmmaker
- Daniel Edlen (born 1975), American painter
- Daniel Edusei (born 1980), Ghanaian footballer
- Daniel Edvardsen (born 1991), Norwegian footballer
- Daniel Edwards, multiple people
- Daniel Effiong (born 1972), Nigerian sprinter
- Daniel Efrat (born 1982), Israeli actor, director, and translator
- Daniel Egan (1803–1870), Australian politician
- Daniel Egbunike (born 1989), English boxer
- Daniel Egerton (1772–1835), English actor
- Daniel Egyin (born 1990), Ghanaian footballer
- Daniel Ehbudzhuo (born 2002), Ukrainian footballer
- Daniel Eich (born 2000), Swiss judoka
- Daniel Eid (born 1998), Norwegian footballer
- Daniel Eie (1889–1961), Norwegian sports official
- Daniel Eisenstein, American cosmologist and academic
- Daniel T. Eismann (1947–2024), American judge
- Daniel Ek (born 1983), Swedish businessman
- Daniel Ekedo (born 1989), Nigerian footballer
- Daniel Ekuale (born 1994), American football player
- Daniel Elahi Galán (born 1996), Colombian tennis player
- Daniel J. Elazar (1934–1999), American political scientist
- Daniel Elbittar (born 1979), Venezuelan actor, model, and singer
- Daniel Elena (born 1972), Monegasque rally co-driver
- Daniel Elfadli (born 1997), Libyan footballer
- Daniel Eliot (1646–1702), British politician
- Daniel Eliott (1798–1872), Scottish civil servant
- Daniel Ellensohn (born 1985), New Zealand footballer
- Daniel Elliott, multiple people
- Daniel Ellis, several people
- Daniel Ellison (1886–1960), American politician
- Daniel Ellsberg (1931–2023), American activist and military analyst
- Daniel Elms (born 1985), British composer
- Daniel Elsner (born 1979), German tennis player
- Daniel Elwell (born 1960), American aviator
- Daniel Embers (born 1981), German footballer and coach
- Daniel Emilfork (1924–2006), Chilean actor
- Daniel Emrich, member of the Montana Senate
- Daniel Endres (born 1985), German footballer
- Daniel Engelbrecht (born 1990), German footballer
- Daniel England (1868–1948), American businessman
- Daniel Enkaoua (born 1962), French painter
- Daniel Enqvist (born 2001), Finnish footballer
- Daniel Eon (1939–2021), French footballer
- Daniel Epps, American legal scholar
- Daniel Epstein, multiple people
- Daniel Eral (born 1940), Peruvian footballer
- Daniel Erasmus, South African athlete
- Daniel Jacobus Elardus Erasmus (1845–1914), Boer general
- Daniel Erich (1649–1712), German organist and composer
- Daniel Eriksson (born 1974), Swedish bandy player
- Daniel Erlandsson (born 1976), Swedish drummer
- Daniel Ermentrout (1837–1899), American politician
- Daniel Ernemann (born 1976), German footballer and coach
- Daniel Errico, American children’s author
- Daniel Ervér, Swedish business executive
- Daniel Escalante (born 1950), Mexican sailor
- Daniel Frederik Eschricht (1798–1863), Danish physician and zoologist
- Daniel Escobar (1964–2013), American actor
- Daniel Escoto, Mexican racing driver
- Daniel Escudero (1941–2021), Chilean footballer
- Daniel Eslava, Mexican athlete
- Daniel Espartaco Sánchez (born 1977), Mexican writer
- Daniel Espeleta (born 1998), American soccer player
- Daniel Espino (born 2001), Panamanian baseball player
- Daniel Espinosa (born 1977), Swedish filmmaker
- Daniel Esposito (born 1963), Australian modern pentathlete
- Daniel Estcott, Anglican clergyman
- Dániel Esterházy (1585–1654), Hungarian noble
- Daniel Estrada, multiple people
- Daniel Estulin (born 1966), Lithuanian-born conspiracy theorist
- Daniel C. Esty (born 1959), American lawyer
- Daniel Etim Effiong (born 1988), Nigerian actor and film director
- Daniel Etounga-Manguelle (1943–2024), Cameroonian economist and writer
- Daniel Europaeus (1820–1884), French linguist and folklorist
- Daniel Evans, several people
- Daniel Everett (born 1951), American linguist and author
- Daniel Everett (RAF officer) (1920–1945), Royal Air Force officer
- Daniel Ewing (born 1983), American basketball player
- Daniel Kofi Ewusie, Ghanaian film producer and film director
- Daniel Ezra (born 1991), British actor
- Daniel Ezralow (born 1956), American artistic director

== F ==
- Daniel Faalele (born 1999), Australian-born American gridiron football player
- Daniel Fabrizi (born 1992), Canadian soccer player
- Daniel Fagiani (born 1974), Argentine footballer
- Daniel O. Fagunwa (1903–1963), Nigerian author
- Daniel Gabriel Fahrenheit (1686–1736), European physicist, inventor, and scientific instrument maker
- Daniel J. Fairbanks, American biologist
- Daniel Faitaua (born 1976), New Zealand television news reporter
- Daniel Faivre, French historian
- Daniel Faleafa (born 1989), Tongan rugby union player
- Daniel Falkiner, 18th century Irish politician
- Daniel Fallins (born 1996), Australian cricketer
- Daniel Falzon (born 1994), Australian motorcycle racer
- Daniel Fanger (born 1988), Swiss footballer
- Daniel L. Fapp (1904–1986), American cinematographer
- Daniel Farabello (born 1973), Argentine-Italian basketball player
- Daniel Farani (born 1977), Samoan rugby player
- Daniel A. Farber (born 1950), American legal scholar
- Daniel Farcas (born 1963), Chilean politician
- Daniel Fardon, British classical composer
- Daniel Farhi (1941–2021), French rabbi
- Daniel Faria (born 1987), Portuguese footballer
- Daniel Farías (born 1981), Venezuelan footballer
- Daniel Faris (born 1987), Lebanese-American basketball player
- Daniel Farkaš (born 1993), Serbian footballer
- Daniel Farke (born 1976), German footballer and manager
- Daniel D. T. Farnsworth (1819–1892), American politician
- Daniel Farrand (1760–1825), American judge
- Daniel Farrands (born 1969), American filmmaker
- Daniel Farrar (born 1985), American soccer coach
- Daniel Farrell, Irish politician
- Daniel F. Farrell (1869–1939), American politician
- Daniel Farren, United States Army Medal of Honor recipient
- Daniel Farson (1927–1997), English writer and broadcaster
- Daniel Fascioli (born 1967), Uruguayan footballer
- Daniel Fasel (born 1967), Swiss footballer
- Daniel Fasquelle (born 1963), French politician
- Daniel Fässler (born 1960), Swiss politician
- Daniel Fathers (born 1966), British actor
- Daniel Fatiaki, Fijian judge
- Daniel Fauché (born 1966), French rower
- Daniel Faunce (1829–1911), American minister and writer
- Daniel Featley (1582–1645), English theologian and controversialist
- Daniel Febles (born 1991), Venezuelan footballer
- Daniel Federkeil (born 1983), Canadian gridiron football player
- Daniel Federman (1928–2017), American endocrinologist
- Daniel Federspiel (born 1987), Austrian cross-country mountain biker
- Daniel Fedorczuk (born 1976), Uruguayan football referee
- Daniel Francis Feehan (1855–1934), American prelate
- Daniel Joseph Feeney (1894–1969), Catholic bishop
- Daniel Feetham (born 1967), Gibraltarian lawyer and politician
- Daniel Fehlow (born 1975), German television and voice actor
- Daniel Feikin, American epidemiologist
- Daniel Feitosa (born 1992), Brazilian futsal player
- Dániel Fejes (born 1999), Hungarian canoeist
- Daniel Feldman, multiple people
- Daniel Felgenhauer (born 1976), German footballer
- Daniel Felipe (born 1992), Brazilian footballer
- Daniel César Felizia (born 1962), Argentine sports shooter
- Daniel Feller, American historian
- Daniel Fells (born 1983), American football player
- Daniel Felsenfeld (born 1970), American classical composer
- Daniel Felton (born 1955), American Catholic bishop
- Daniel G. Fenton (1812–1851), American politician
- Daniel Feraud (born 1953), Argentine fencer
- Daniel Féret (born 1944), Belgian politician
- Daniel Ferguson, multiple people
- Daniel Fernandes, multiple people
- Daniel Fernandez, multiple people
- Daniel Fernando (born 1962), Filipino actor and politician
- Daniel de Fernando (1938–2019), Spanish pharmacist and politician
- Daniel Ferre (born 1962), French sailor
- Daniel Ferreira (writer) (born 1981), Colombian writer and blogger
- Daniel Ferreira (born 1982), Paraguayan footballer
- Daniel Ferreira do Nascimento (born 1998), Brazilian long-distance runner
- Daniel Ferreyra (born 1982), Argentine football goalkeeper
- Daniel Tweed Ferrier (1841–1914), American Civil War soldier
- Daniel Ferro (1921–2015), American opera singer
- Daniel Fessler, American academic
- Daniel Fiala (born 1972), Czech tennis player
- Daniel Fichelscher (born 1953), German musician
- Daniel Fickle (born 1980), American film director
- Daniel Fidelin (born 1948), French politician
- Daniel Fields (born 1991), American baseball player
- Daniel Fignolé (1913–1986), Haitian politician
- Daniel Figueroa (born 1983), Spanish baseball player
- Daniel Fila (born 2002), Czech footballer
- Daniel Filho (born 1937), Brazilian film producer
- Daniel Filipacchi (born 1928), French media executive
- Daniel Damásio Ascensão Filipe (1925–1964), Cape Verdean poet and journalist
- Daniel Filmus (born 1955), Argentine politician
- Daniel Finch, multiple people
- Daniel Finěk (born 2000), Czech footballer
- Daniel Finkelstein (born 1962), British journalist and politician
- Daniel Finlayson (born 2001), Northern Irish footballer
- Daniel E. Finn Sr. (1845–1910), American politician
- Daniel Fischbuch (born 1993), German professional ice hockey player
- Daniel Fischel (born 1950), American academic
- Daniel Fischer, multiple people
- Daniel Fisher, several people
- Daniel Fishkin, American musician
- Daniel Fister (born 1958), American politician
- Daniel Fitter, English Catholic clergyman
- Daniel Fitzgerald, multiple people
- Daniel Fitzgibbon (born 1976), Australian Paralympic sailor
- Daniel Fitzhenry (born 1979), Australian rugby league footballer
- Daniel Fitzpatrick, multiple people
- Daniel Webster Flagler (1835–1899), United States Army general
- Daniel Flaherty (born 1993), American actor
- Daniel M. Flanigan, American politician
- Daniel Flannery, American artist
- Daniel Fleck (1949–2011), American politician
- Daniel Fleeman (born 1982), English racing cyclist
- Daniel M. Fleetwood (born 1958), American scientist, inventor, engineer, and innovator
- Daniel Fleming, multiple people
- Daniel W. Fletcher (born 1990), London-based fashion designer
- Daniel Fletcher (1974–2015), Australian rules footballer
- Daniel Flickinger, audio engineer
- Daniel Kumler Flickinger (1824–1911), American bishop
- Daniel Flood (1903–1994), American politician
- Daniel Florea, multiple people
- Daniel Florêncio, Brazilian-born British film director, writer, and producer
- Daniel Flores, multiple people
- Daniel Flottmann (born 1984), German footballer
- Daniel Flynn, multiple people
- Daniel Foder (born 1983), Danish cyclist
- Daniel Yusmic Pancastaki Foekh (born 1964), Indonesian judge
- Daniel Mark Fogel, American academic
- Daniel Fogg (born 1987), English swimmer
- Daniel Fohr (1801–1862), German painter
- Daniel Foley, multiple people
- Daniel Follonier (born 1994), Swiss footballer
- Daniel Fonseca (born 1969), Uruguayan footballer
- Daniel de Fonseca, Portuguese court physician
- Daniel Font (born 1993), Welsh badminton player
- Daniel Fontana (born 1975), Argentine-Italian triathlete
- Daniel Lewis Foote, American diplomat
- Daniel Forcén Esteban (born 1994), Spanish chess grandmaster
- Daniel Ford, American novelist
- Daniel Forfang (born 1979), Norwegian ski jumper
- Daniel Munroe Forney (1784–1847), American politician
- Daniel Forsberg (born 1992), Finnish kickboxer
- Daniel Forsman, Swedish librarian
- Daniel Fortea (1878–1953), Spanish guitarist and composer
- Daniel Foss (1940–2014), American-Canadian sociologist
- Daniel Föst (born 1976), German politician
- Daniel Foster, multiple people
- Daniel Fournier, multiple people
- Daniel Davis Foute (1799–1865), American frontiersman
- Daniel Fowle, multiple people
- Daniel Fowler (1810–1894), Canadian painter and journalist
- Daniel Fox, multiple people
- Daniel Frahn (born 1987), German footballer
- Daniel Frame (born 1975), Australian rugby league footballer
- Daniel Francis, multiple people
- Daniel Franco, multiple people
- Daniel Frank, multiple people
- Daniel P. Franklin, American political scientist
- Daniel Franks, multiple people
- Daniel Franzese (born 1978), American actor
- Daniel Franziskus (born 1991), German footballer
- Daniel Fraser, multiple people
- Daniel Frasson (1966–2023), Brazilian footballer and coach
- Daniel Frawley, multiple people
- Daniel Frederiksen, Australian actor
- Daniel Fredheim Holm (born 1985), Norwegian footballer
- Daniel Freedman, multiple people
- Daniel Freeman, multiple people
- Daniel Freire (born 1961), Argentine film actor
- Daniel Freitas, multiple people
- Daniel French, multiple people
- Daniel Frescó, Argentine writer and journalist
- Daniel Freund (born 1984), German politician
- Daniel Friberg, Swedish businessman and publisher
- Daniel Friberg (speed skater) (born 1986), Swedish speed skater
- Daniel Frick (born 1978), Liechtenstein footballer
- Daniel Fridell (born 1967), Swedish film director and producer
- Daniel Friderici (1584–1638), German cantor, conductor, and composer
- Daniel Fried, American diplomat
- Daniel Friedan (born 1948), American physicist
- Daniel Friedman, multiple people
- Daniel A. Frink (1835–1885), American politician
- Daniel D. Frisbie (1859–1931), American businessman and politician
- Daniel Frischmann (1728–1808), Swiss military officer, merchant and politician
- Daniel Frogson (born 2002), British actor
- Daniel Frohman (1851–1940), American film producer
- Daniel Froschauer (born 1965), Austrian violinist
- Daniel Frost, multiple people
- Daniel Fry (1908–1992), American contactee
- Daniel Fuchs (1909–1993), American writer
- Daniel Fulanse (born 1962), Zambian boxer
- Daniel Fuller (1925–2023), American theologian
- Daniel Funeriu (born 1971), Romanian politician
- Daniel Fung, Singaporean psychiatrist
- Daniel Funke, German journalist
- Daniel Furlong (born 1998), Irish singer
- Daniel Fusco (born 1975), American musician
- Daniel Fuss, American businessman
- Daniel Fuzato (born 1997), Brazilian footballer

== G ==
- Daniel Gachara (born 1972), Kenyan runner
- Daniel Gachulinec (born 1994), Slovak ice hockey defender
- Daniel Gad (born 1990), Israeli actor
- Daniel W. Gade (1936–2015), American academic
- Daniel Gade (born 1975), American critic of United States veterans' services and disability policies
- Daniel Gadegaard (born 2001), Danish footballer
- Daniel Gadia (born 1995), Filipino footballer
- Daniel Gadzhev (born 1985), Bulgarian footballer
- Daniel Gafford (born 1998), American basketball player
- Daniel Gage (1828–1901), American ice harvester
- Daniel Gagliardi (born 1997), American soccer player
- Daniel Gahan (1671–1713), Irish-Anglican politician
- Daniel Gajski, American computer scientist
- Daniel Galbraith, multiple people
- Daniel Galera (born 1979), Brazilian writer, translator and editor
- Daniel Gallagher, multiple people
- Daniel Gallant, American theatre producer
- Daniel Gallegos (born 1978), American attorney and judge
- Daniel Gallemore (born 1985), American boxer and mixed martial artist
- Daniel V. Gallery (1901–1977), United States admiral
- Daniel Gallery (1859–1920), Canadian politician
- Daniel Galmiche (born 1958), French chef
- Daniel F. Galouye (1920–1976), American science fiction writer
- Daniel Gamarra (born 1978), Uruguayan footballer
- Daniel Ganderton (born 1988), Australian jockey
- Daniel Ganjaman (born 1978), Brazilian musician
- Dániel Garas (born 1973), Hungarian cinematographer
- Daniel Garbade (born 1957), Swiss painter, illustrator, art director, property master and publisher
- Daniel Garber (1880–1958), American painter
- Daniel Garber (philosopher), American philosopher
- Daniel García, several people
- Daniel L. Gard (born 1954), United States Navy rear admiral
- Daniel Gardelle (1679–1753), Swiss miniature painter
- Daniel Gardner, multiple people
- Daniel Garibay (born 1973), Mexican baseball player
- Daniel Garlick (1818–1902), South Australian architect
- Daniel Garlitsky (born 1982), Russian violinist and conductor
- Daniel Garnero (born 1969), Argentine football manager
- Daniel G. Garnsey (1779–1851), American politician
- Daniel Garodnick (born 1972), American politician
- Daniel E. Garrett (1869–1932), American politician
- Daniel Garrett, British architect
- Daniel Garrido (born 2000), Spanish association footballer
- Daniel Garrigue (born 1948), French politician
- Daniel Garrison (1782–1851), American politician
- Daniel Garro (born 1990), Argentine footballer
- Daniel Gartner (born 1972), Australian rugby league footballer
- Daniel Garvey, American academic administrator
- Daniel Garwe, Zimbabwean politician
- Daniel Garza (born 1985), Mexican professional tennis player
- Daniel Gaskell (1782–1875), British Liberal Party politician
- Daniel Gasman (1933–2012), American historian
- Daniel Gaudet (born 1959), Canadian artistic gymnast
- Daniel Gaudiello (born 1982), Australian ballet dancer
- Daniel Gaul, American judge
- Daniel Gault (1842–1912), American politician
- Daniel Gaunt (born 1985), New Zealand racing driver
- Daniel Gaunt (golfer) (born 1978), Australian professional golfer
- Daniel Gauthier (born 1970), Canadian ice hockey player
- Daniel Gavins (born 1991), English professional golfer
- Daniel Gawthrop, multiple people
- Daniel Amador Gaxiola (born 1956), Mexican politician
- Daniel Gaysinsky (born 1994), Canadian karateka
- Daniel Gazda (born 1997), Czech ice hockey player
- Dániel Gazdag (born 1996), Hungarian footballer
- Daniel Geale (born 1981), Australian boxer
- Daniel Gee (1876–1947), Australian cricketer
- Daniel Geere, English cricketer
- Daniel Geey, English sports lawyer
- Daniel Geiser (1917–2009), American sports coach
- Daniel Geismayr (born 1989), Austrian cyclist
- Daniel Geissler (born 1994), Austrian footballer
- Daniel Gélin (1921–2002), French actor
- Daniel A. Geller, Australian-American pediatrician and psychiatrist
- Daniel Genis (born 1978), Russian-American journalist, writer and media personality
- Daniel Genov, multiple people
- Daniel George, multiple people
- Daniel Georges-Abeyie (born 1948), American criminologist
- Daniel Georgiev (born 1982), Bulgarian footballer
- Daniel Georgievski (born 1988), Macedonian footballer
- Dániel Gera (born 1995), Hungarian footballer
- Daniel James Gercke (1874–1964), American prelate
- Daniel Gerdes (1698–1765), German Calvinist theologian
- Daniel Gerlach, German non-fiction writer
- Daniel Gerlich, German cell biologist
- Daniel Germain, Canadian philanthropist
- Daniel R. Gernatt Sr. (1917–2014), American businessman
- Daniel C. Gerould (1928–2012), American dramatist
- Daniel Gerroll (born 1951), British actor
- Daniel Geschwind, American geneticist
- Daniel Gevargiz (1940–2020), Iranian weightlifter
- Daniël Théodore Gevers van Endegeest (1793–1877), Dutch politician
- Daniel Ghiță (born 1981), Romanian kickboxer and politician
- Daniel Giacomino (born 1964), Argentine politician
- Daniel Gianola, American geneticist
- Daniel Giansiracusa (born 1982), Australian rules footballer
- Daniel Giasson (born 1987), Brazilian-born Italian futsal player
- Daniel Gibbs (born 1968), French politician
- Daniel Giffard (born 1984), British speedway rider
- Daniel Gigante (born 1981), Brazilian footballer
- Daniel Giger (born 1949), Swiss fencer
- Daniel Giguère (born 1957), Canadian politician
- Daniel Gil (1930–2004), Spanish graphic designer
- Daniel Giladi, Israeli Paralympic volleyball player, athlete and swimmer
- Daniel Gilbert, multiple people
- Daniel Gilchrist (1882–1964), New Zealand rugby footballer
- Daniel Gildemeester, 18th-century Dutch businessman
- Daniel Gildenlöw (born 1973), Swedish musician
- Daniel Giles, British merchant and banker
- Daniel Webster Gill (1856–1933), American politician
- Daniel Gillespie (1938–2017), American physicist
- Daniel Gillette Olney (1909–1980), American sculptor
- Daniel Gillies (born 1976), Canadian-born New Zealand actor
- Daniel Gillmor (1849–1918), Canadian politician
- Daniel Gillois (1888–1959), French equestrian
- Daniel Gilman, multiple people
- Daniel Gilmore (born 1983), Australian rules footballer
- Daniel Giménez, multiple people
- Daniel Gimeno Traver (born 1985), Spanish tennis player
- Daniel Ginczek (born 1991), German footballer
- Daniel B. Ginsberg (born 1974), American civil servant
- Daniel M. Ginsberg (born 1993), American-Israeli basketball player
- Daniel Giorgetti, British composer
- Daniel Giraldo Correa (born 1984), Colombian Paralympic swimmer
- Daniel Giraldo (born 1992), Colombian footballer
- Daniel Girardi (born 1984), Canadian ice hockey player
- Daniel Giraud (1946–2023), French writer and poet
- Daniel Girón (born 1989), Mexican basketball player
- Daniel Gisiger (born 1954), Swiss cyclist
- Daniel Gittard (1625–1686), French architect
- Daniel Giubellini (born 1969), Swiss gymnast
- Daniel Giulianini (born 1987), Italian operatic bass
- Daniel Gjorgjeski (born 1993), Macedonian handball player
- Daniel Glancy (born 1988), Irish tennis player
- Daniel Glaser, American civil servant
- Daniel Glass, American music executive
- Daniel Glass (drummer) (born 1966), American drummer
- Daniel Glatman (born 1975), British music manager
- Daniel Glattauer (born 1960), Austrian writer and journalist
- Daniel Glaus (born 1957), Swiss composer
- Daniel Glazman (born 1967), French programmer
- Daniel Glimmenvall (born 1974), Swedish ice hockey player
- Daniel Glira (born 1994), Italian ice hockey player
- Daniel Glomb (born 1980), Brazilian Olympic sailor
- Daniel Gluckstein (born 1953), French Trotskyist politician
- Daniel Liam Glyn (born 1986), British music composer
- Daniel Go (born 1966), Filipino architect of Chinese descent
- Daniel Goa (born 1953), New Caledonian politician
- Daniel Gobeil, Canadian politician
- Daniel Godbold (born 1975), New Zealand rugby union footballer
- Daniel Goddard (multiple people)
- Daniel Godelli (born 1992), Albanian weightlifter
- Daniel Godfrey, multiple people
- Daniel Godoy (born 1981), Venezuelan footballer
- Daniel Goens (born 1948), Belgian cyclist
- Daniël van Goens (1858–1904), French cellist and composer
- Daniel Gogarty (born 1996), Canadian soccer player
- Daniel Gogerly (1792–1862), British missionary and scholar
- Daniel Goh, Singaporean politician
- Daniel Goh (footballer) (born 1999), Singaporean association football player
- Daniel Göhlert (born 1980), German footballer
- Daniel Goiți, Romanian pianist
- Daniel Eric Gold (born 1975), American actor
- Daniel Gold, Israeli military personnel
- Daniel Goldberg, multiple people
- Daniel Golden, American journalist
- Daniel Goldhaber, American director, screenwriter and producer
- Daniel Goldhagen (born 1959), American author and academic
- Daniel Goldin (born 1940), American engineer
- Daniel Goldman, multiple people
- Daniel Goldner, American architect
- Daniel Goldstein, American cognitive psychologist
- Daniel Goldston (born 1954), American mathematician
- Daniel Goldstraw (born 1969), English cricketer
- Daniel Gołębiewski (born 1987), Polish footballer
- Daniel Goleman (born 1946), American author and science journalist
- Daniel Gollan (born 1955), Argentine cardiologist and politician
- Daniel Golubovic (born 1993), Australian decathlete
- Daniel Gomes (born 1997), Indian footballer
- Daniel Gómez, multiple people
- Daniel Gonçalves (born 1982), Portuguese football coach
- Daniel Goneau (born 1976), Canadian ice hockey player
- Daniel González, several people
- Daniel Gooch, multiple people
- Daniel Goodard, British canoeist
- Daniel Goode (born 1936), American classical composer
- Daniel Goodenow (1793–1863), American judge
- Daniel Goodfellow (born 1996), British diver
- Daniel Carson Goodman (1881–1957), American film director
- Daniel Goodman (1945–2012), American professor
- Daniel Goodwin, multiple people
- Daniel Gopher (born 1943), Israeli cognitive psychologist
- Daniel Górak (born 1983), Polish table tennis player
- Daniel Vincent Gordh (born 1985), American writer and comedian
- Daniel Gordis (born 1959), American-born Israeli author
- Daniel Gordon, multiple people
- Daniel Gorenstein (1923–1992), American mathematician
- Daniel Goriola (born 2005), British athlete
- Daniel Gormally (born 1976), English chess grandmaster
- Daniel Mary Gorman (1861–1927), American prelate
- Daniel Gorman, arts manager and human rights worker
- Daniel Gorringe (born 1992), Australian rules footballer
- Daniel Gortler (born 1965), Israeli musical artist
- Daniel Gosa, American politician
- Daniel Gossett (born 1992), American baseball player
- Daniel Gott (1794–1864), American politician
- Daniel Gottesman (born 1970), American physicist
- Daniel Gouffier (1937–2025), French sailor
- Daniel Goulding (born 1986), Irish sportsperson
- Daniel Goulet (1928–2007), French politician
- Daniël Goulooze (1901–1965), Dutch communist and resistance fighter
- Daniel Goumou (born 1990), Guinean footballer
- Daniel Govan (1829–1911), American miner, planter and soldier
- Daniel Gowing (1971–2017), New Zealand judoka
- Daniel Goyer, Canadian politician
- Daniel Grabauskas (born 1963), American transportation executive and government figure
- Daniel Gráč (1943–2008), Slovak cyclist
- Daniel Gracie (born 1972), Brazilian jiu-jitsu practitioner
- Daniel Graf (born 1977), German footballer
- Daniel Graf (biathlete) (born 1981), German biathlete
- Daniel Graham, multiple people
- Daniel Graisberry, Irish printer
- Daniel Gralath (1708–1767), politician and physicist
- Daniel Gramann (born 1987), Austrian footballer
- Daniel Gramatikov (born 1989), Bulgarian footballer
- Daniel Gran (1694–1757), Austrian painter
- Daniel Granada (1847–1929), Spanish-Uruguayan philosopher
- Daniel Grando, multiple people
- Daniel Granger, multiple people
- Daniel Jesús Granja Peniche (born 1986), Mexican politician
- Daniel Granli (born 1994), Norwegian footballer
- Daniel Granstedt (born 1975), Swedish musician
- Daniel Grant, multiple people
- Daniel Grao (born 1976), Spanish actor
- Daniel Graovac (born 1993), Bosnian footballer
- Daniel Graßmück (born 1987), Austrian badminton player
- Daniel Grassl (born 2002), Italian figure skater
- Daniel Grau (1948–2021), Venezuelan record artist
- Daniel Gravius, 17th-century Dutch missionary
- Daniel Granger, multiple people
- Daniel Greathouse, American pioneer
- Daniel Greaves, multiple people
- Daniel Greco (born 1979), Swiss footballer
- Daniel W. Greear (born 1968), American politician
- Daniel Green, several people
- Daniel Greenberg, multiple people
- Daniel Greenberger, American quantum physicist
- Daniel Greene, multiple people
- Daniel S. Greenspan, American biomedical scientist, academic and researcher
- Daniel Greenstein, PSIA- snowboarder
- Daniel Greenwood, English clergyman and academic administrator
- Daniel Greer, American lawyer
- Daniel Grégorich (born 1996), Cuban Greco-Roman wrestler
- Daniel Greig (born 1991), Australian speed skater
- Daniel Gremsl (born 1992), Austrian footballer
- Daniel Grenier, Canadian writer from Quebec
- Daniel Grenon (born 1948), French politician
- Daníel Leó Grétarsson (born 1995), Icelandic footballer
- Daniel Grey (1848–1900), Welsh medical practitioner
- Daniel Grieder (born 1961), Swiss entrepreneur and business executive
- Daniel Griffin, multiple people
- Daniel A. Griffith (born 1948), American geographer, spatial statistician, and geographic information scientist
- Daniel Grigore (born 1969), Romanian fencer
- Daniel Grillfors (born 1982), Swedish ice hockey player
- Daniel Grimshaw (born 1998), English footballer
- Daniel A. Grimsley (1840–1910), American politician
- Daniel Grinbank (born 1954), Argentine businessman and impresario
- Daniel Grisewood (1934–2003), British packager and publisher
- Daniel M. Grissom, American journalist
- Daniel T. Griswold, director of the Cato Institute
- Daniel Gritsch (born 1954), Austrian ice hockey player
- Daniel Grodnik (born 1952), American film producer
- Daniel Gros (born 1955), German economist
- Daniel Grose (1903–1971), English cricketer
- Daniel Gross, multiple people
- Daniel Grossberg (born 1978), American politician
- Daniel Grossman, American obstetrician, gynecologist and medical researcher
- Daniel Grou (born 1967), Canadian film and television director
- Daniel Grove (1923–1999), Colorado state legislator
- Daniel W. Grubbs (1835–1917), American politician
- Daniel Grueso (born 1985), Colombian sprinter
- Daniel Guda (born 1996), Australian badminton player
- Daníel Guðjohnsen (born 2006), Icelandic footballer
- Daníel Guðni Guðmundsson (born 1986), Icelandic basketball player
- Daniel Guedes (born 1994), Brazilian footballer
- Daniel Guérard (born 1974), Canadian ice hockey player
- Daniel Guérin (1904–1988), French anarchy-communist author
- Daniel Guérin (table tennis), French table tennis player
- Daniel Guerrero, multiple people
- Daniel Guggenheim (1856–1930), American mining magnate and philanthropist
- Daniel Guicci (1943–2016), French footballer
- Daniel Guice (1924–2017), American lawyer and politician
- Daniel Guice Jr. (born 1953), American businessman and politician
- Daniel Guichard (born 1948), French recording artist and singer
- Daniel Guijo-Velasco (born 1984), Belgian footballer
- Daniel Guile (1814–1882), British trade unionist
- Daniel Guilet (1899–1990), French musician
- Daniel Guimarães (1987–2024), Brazilian footballer
- Daniel Guitard (born 1959), Canadian politician
- Daniel Güiza (born 1980), Spanish footballer
- Daniel Guldemont (born 1953), Belgian judoka
- D. D. Gunasekera, Sri Lankan Sinhala businessman and politician
- Daniel Gunkel (born 1980), German footballer
- Daniel Gunn, multiple people
- Daniel Gunnarsson (born 1992), Swedish ice hockey player
- Daniel Günther (born 1973), German politician
- Daniel Gurney, 19th-century English banker and antiquarian
- Daniel Gurrión Matías (born 1958), Mexican politician
- Daniel Gürschner (born 1973), German judoka
- Daniel Gustavsson (born 1990), Swedish footballer
- Daniel Gutiérrez (born 2003), Chilean footballer
- Daniel G. P. Gutierrez, American episcopal bishop
- Daniel Gutiérrez Castorena (born 1954), Mexican politician
- Daniel Gutknecht, Swiss male curler
- Daniel Gutman (1901–1993), American lawyer, state senator, state assemblyman, judge and law school dean
- Daniel Gutstein, American writer
- Daniel Guttfreund (born 1962), Salvadoran clinical psychologist, academic and researcher
- Daniel Guzmán, multiple people
- Daniel Gyasi (born 1994), Ghanaian sprinter
- Daniel Gygax (born 1981), Swiss footballer
- Dániel Gyivánovity (born 1979), Serbian politician
- Dániel Gyollai (born 1997), Hungarian footballer
- Dániel Gyurta (born 1989), Hungarian swimmer

== H ==
- Daniel Haakonsen (1917–1989), Norwegian literary historian
- Daniel Haaksman, German musician
- Daniel Haarbo (born 2003), Danish footballer
- Daniel Haas (born 1983), German professional footballer
- Daniel Haber, multiple people
- Daniel Haberman (1933–1991), American poet
- Daniel Habesohn (born 1986), Austrian table tennis player
- Daniel Hackett (water polo) (born 1970), American water polo player
- Daniel Hackett (born 1987), Italian-American basketball player
- Daniel Hadad (born 1961), Argentine businessman
- Dániel Hadfi (born 1982), Hungarian judoka
- Daniel Häfeli (born 1960), Swiss footballer
- Daníel Hafsteinsson (born 1999), Icelandic footballer
- Daniel B. Hagar (1820–1896), American educator
- Daniel Hagari, Israeli military officer
- Daniel Hägele (born 1989), German footballer
- Daniel Hagen, American actor
- Daniel Hagen (musician), Australian musician
- Daniel Hagerman (c. 1794–1821), Canadian politician
- Daniel Yohannes Haggos, Ethiopian-German musician and academic
- Daniel Haglöf (born 1978), Swedish racing driver
- Daniel Haglund (born 1980), Swedish musician
- Daniel Hahn (born 1973), British writer, editor and translator
- Daniel Henry Haigh, 19th-century English runologist and numismatist
- Daniel Hailes, British diplomat
- Daniel Haines (1801–1877), American politician, jurist, lawyer and Governor of New Jersey
- Daniel Haines (footballer) (born 1981), Australian rules footballer
- Daniel Håkans (born 2000), Finnish footballer
- Daniel Hakansson (born 1996), Swedish ice hockey player
- Daniel Halachev (born 2005), Bulgarian footballer
- Daniel Halangahu (born 1984), Australian rugby union player
- Daniel Halasz, Swedish media executive
- Daniel Halberstam, American academic
- Daniel Rutherford Haldane (1824–1887), British physician
- Daniel Hale, multiple people
- Daniel Halemba (born 2001), German politician
- Daniel Halévy (1872–1962), French historian
- Daniel Halfar (born 1988), German professional footballer
- Daniel Hall, several people
- Daniel Hallberg (born 1987), Swedish comedian and television presenter
- Daniel Hallé (1614–1675), French painter
- Daniel Haller (1929–2024), American film editor
- Daniel Hallingström (born 1981), Swedish footballer and manager
- Daniel Halper, American political writer
- Daniel Halpern, American publisher and author
- Daniel Hamburg (born 1948), American politician
- Daniel S. Hamermesh (born 1943), American economist
- Daniel Hamilton, multiple people
- Daniel Hammond (born 1985), English footballer
- Daniel Hančák (born 1984), Slovak ice hockey player
- Daniel W. Hand (1869–1945), United States Army brigadier general
- Daniel Hand, Irish hurler
- Daniel Handler (born 1970), American writer
- Daniel Bonifacius von Haneberg (1816–1876), German Catholic bishop and orientalist
- Daniel Hanington(1804–1889), Canadian politician
- Daniel Lionel Hanington (1835–1909), Canadian politician and jurist
- Daniel Lionel Hanington (Royal Canadian Navy officer) (1921–1999), Canadian Navy admiral
- Daniel Hanley, multiple people
- Daniel D. Hanna, American politician
- Daniel Hannan (born 1971), British politician
- Daniel L. Hannifin, American politician
- Daniel Hansberry, American politician
- Daniel Moen Hansen (born 1983), Norwegian footballer
- Daniel Hanslik (born 1996), German footballer
- Daniel Haqiqatjou, American Muslim writer and speaker
- Daníel Ágúst Haraldsson (born 1969), Icelandic singer and musician
- Daniel Hardcastle (born 1989), British YouTuber and author
- Daniel Harding (born 1975), British conductor
- Daniel Hardy, multiple people
- Daniel Harford (born 1977), Australian rules footballer
- Daniel Hargraves, Australian rules footballer
- Daniël Haringh, Dutch painter
- Daniel Harkins (1836–1902), American actor
- Daniel Harkness, author and Boise State University professor
- Daniel M. Harkness (1822–1896), American merchant and businessman
- Daniel Harlow, American physicist
- Daniel Harper, multiple people
- Daniel Harple (born 1959), American businessman
- Daniel Harrington, multiple people
- Daniel Harris, multiple people
- Daniel Harrison, multiple people
- Daniel Hart, multiple people
- Daniel Hartl, American biologist
- Daniel Hartvig (born 1996), Danish cyclist
- Daniel Hartwich (born 1978), German TV presenter
- Daniel Harvey, multiple people
- Daniel Harvie (born 1998), Scottish footballer
- Daniel Haseloff (born 1988), German politician
- Daniel Hasler (born 1974), Liechtenstein footballer
- Daniel Hastings, multiple people
- D. C. Hatcher (c. 1837–1912), American politician
- Daniel Hauben (born 1956), American painter
- Daniel Haugh (born 1995), American hammer thrower
- Daniel L. Haulman, American Air Force historian
- Daniel Hauser (wrestler) (1930–1969), Swiss wrestler
- Dániel Hauser (born 1986), Hungarian footballer
- Daniel M. Hausman (born 1947), American philosopher
- Daniel Hausmann (born 2003), German footballer
- Daniel Hausrath (born 1976), German chess grandmaster
- Daniel Hautzinger (born 1998), Austrian footballer
- Daniel Havel (born 1991), Czech canoeist
- Daniel Hawksford (born 1980), Welsh actor
- Daniel Hay (1781–1853), American politician
- Daniel Hay du Chastelet de Chambon (1596–1671), French mathematician
- Daniel Hayes (born 1985), Trinidadian boxer, actor and model
- Daniel Haynes, multiple people
- Daniel Hays, multiple people
- Daniel Hayward (1808–1852), English cricketer
- Daniel Hayward (cricketer, born 1832) (1832–1910), English cricketer
- Daniel R. Headrick, American historian and writer
- Daniel Heartz (1928–2019), American musicologist
- Daniel Hecht, multiple people
- Daniel Hechter (born 1938), French fashion designer
- Daniel Heckenberg (born 1979), Australian rugby league footballer
- Daniel Hediger (born 1958), Swiss biathlete
- Daniel Hedrera (born 1983), Spanish footballer
- Daniel Heenan (born 1981), Australian rugby union player
- Daniel van Heerden (1944–2024), South African cricketer
- Daniel Heese (1867–1901), South African missionary
- Daniel Heffernan (born 1987), English footballer
- Daniel Hege, American orchestral conductor
- Daniel Heidkamp, American painter
- Daniel Heidman (born 1982), Israeli footballer
- Daniel Heifetz (born 1948), American concert violinist and pedagogue
- Daniel Heikkinen (born 2002), Finnish footballer
- Daniel van Heil, Flemish baroque landscape painter
- Daniel Heiner, multiple people
- Daniel Heinsius (1580–1655), Dutch scholar and poet
- Daniel Helldén (born 1965), Swedish politician
- Daniel Hellebuyck (1933–2001), Belgian boxer
- Daniel Heller-Roazen, Canadian philosopher
- Daniel Hellmann (born 1985), Swiss performance artist
- Daniel Helm (born 1995), American football player
- Daniel A. Helminiak (born 1942), American priest and author
- Daniël Camerling Helmolt (1886–1960), Dutch equestrian
- Daniel Hemetsberger (born 1991), Austrian alpine skier
- Daniel Hemric (born 1991), American racing driver
- Daniel Henchman (1689–1761), American publisher and bookseller
- Daniel Hendler (born 1976), Uruguayan actor and director
- Daniel Hennequin (born 1961), French physicist
- Daniel Henney (born 1979), Korean-American actor and model
- Daniel Henninger (born 1945), American journalist
- Daniel Henrich (born 1991), German footballer
- Daniel Henriksson (born 1978), Swedish ice hockey player
- Daniel Henry, multiple people
- Daniel Hensel (born 1978), German composer, VJ, musicologist and music theorist
- Daniel Henshall (born 1982), Australian actor
- Daniel Henstridge, English organist and composer
- Daniel Heradstveit (1940–2018), Norwegian political scientist
- Daniel Herberg (born 1974), German curler
- Daniel Herbert (born 1974), Australian rugby union player
- Daniel Heredia Abidal (born 1993), Spanish singer
- Daniel Hérelle (born 1988), French footballer
- Daniel Webster Hering (1850–1938), American physicist and university dean
- Daniel Hermann, multiple people
- Daniel Hermansson (born 1982), Swedish ice hockey player
- Daniel Hernández, multiple people
- Daniel Herrendorf (born 1965), Argentine writer, essayist and philosopher
- Daniel Herrera, multiple people
- Daniel Herrington (born 1986), American racing driver
- Daniel L. Herrmann (1913–1991), American judge
- Daniel Herschlag (born 1958), American biochemist
- Daniel Hershkowitz (born 1953), Israeli politician, mathematician, rabbi, and president of Bar-Ilan University
- Daniel Herskedal (born 1982), Norwegian musician
- Daniel W. Herzog (1941–2023), American Anglican bishop
- Daniel Hersog (born 1985), Canadian jazz trumpeter
- Daniel L. Hertz Jr. (1930–2021), American industry executive
- Daniel Hertzberg (born 1946), American journalist
- Daniel Heryanto (born 1969), Indonesian tennis player
- Daniel W. Herzog (1941–2023), American Anglican bishop
- Daniel Hesidence (born 1975), American painter
- Daniel Hesse, American CEO
- Daniel Berg Hestad (born 1975), Norwegian footballer and football manager
- Daniel Hevesi, American politician
- Daniel Hewitt, British journalist
- Daniel Heymann, Argentine economist
- Daniel Hidalgo Valdés (born 1971), Mexican composer, record producer, sound designer and education researcher
- Daniel Hiester (1747–1804), American politician
- Daniel Hiester (1774–1834), American politician
- Daniel Higgins (born 1998), Scottish footballer
- Daniel J. Hilferty, American business executive
- Daniel Hill, multiple people
- Daniel Hillel (1930–2021), Israeli–American agronomist, researcher and author
- Daniel Hilliard (1824–1888), Canadian politician
- Daniel Hillier (born 1998), New Zealand professional wrestler
- Daníel Hilmarsson (born 1964), Icelandic alpine skier
- Daniel Hilti (born 1965), Liechtenstein teacher and politician
- Daniel T. Hindman (1839–1915), American politician
- Daniel J. Hinkley, American plantsman
- Daniel M. Hirsch, American diplomat
- Daniel Hisgen (1733–1812), German painter
- Daniel Hitchcock (1739–1777), Continental Army officer
- Daniel Hitchcock (politician) (1908–1996), Australian politician
- Daniel Hittle (1950–2000), American serial killer, spree killer and mass murderer
- Daniel Hjorth (1931–2020), Swedish literary scholar and publisher
- Daniel E. Ho, American lawyer and professor
- Daniel Ho (born 1968), American musician, composer and producer
- Daniel Hoan (1881–1961), American politician
- Daniel Hoban (born 1998), Scottish footballer
- Daniel Hobbins, American historian
- Daniel Hobbs, American politician
- Daniel Hoch, multiple people
- Daniel Hochhauser (born 1997), British oncologist
- Daniel Hodge (born 1959), Curaçaoan politician
- Daniel Hodges, American police officer
- Daniel Hoeffel (1929–2025), French politician
- Daniel Høegh (born 1991), Danish footballer
- Daniel Hoelgaard (born 1993), Norwegian cyclist
- Daniel Hoevels (born 1978), Swedish-born German theater actor
- Daniel Hoffer, American entrepreneur
- Daniel Hoffman (1923–2013), American poet and essayist
- Daniel Hoffman (violinist), American musician and film producer
- Daniel Hoffmann (born 1971), German footballer
- Daniel Hofmann, Swiss luger
- Daniel Hofstetter (born 1992), German footballer
- Daniel Hogan, multiple people
- Daniel Hogg (born 2004), English cricketer
- Daniel Hoghton (1770–1811), British Napoleonic general
- Daniel R. Hokanson (born 1963), US Army general
- Daniel Holdsworth, multiple people
- Daniel Holgado (born 2005), Spanish motorcycle racer
- Daniel Hollander (born 1972), American figure skater
- Daniel Hollands (1927–2006), Canadian politician
- Daniel Hollie (born 1977), American professional wrestler
- Daniel Holloway, multiple people
- Daniel Holm (born 1995), Danish footballer and coach
- Daniel Henry Holmes (1816–1898), American businessman
- Daniel Holmes (1863–1955), Scottish Liberal Party politician
- Daniel Holowaty (born 1989), American soccer player
- Daniel Holt, American politician
- Daniel Holtmeyer, American politician
- D. C. Holtom (1884–1962), American ethnologist
- Daniel Holtzclaw (born 1986), convicted former American police officer
- Daniel Holz, American physicist
- Daniel Holzer (born 1995), Czech footballer
- Daniel Hölzle (born 1981), Swiss politician and scholar
- Daniel Homberger (born 1955), Swiss rower
- Daniel Hondo (born 1982), Zimbabwean rugby union footballer and cricketer
- Daniel Höner (born 1953), Swiss figure skater
- Daniel Hong (born 1986), Taiwanese actor and musician
- Daniel Chonghan Hong (1956–2002), Korean-American theoretical physicist
- Daniel Hood (born 1967), American writer
- Daniel Hooker (1831–1894), American politician
- Daniel Hooper, multiple people
- Daniel Hope (born 1973), South African-born classical violinist
- Daniel Hopfer (1470–1536), German artist
- Daniel Hopkin (1886–1951), British politician
- D. Hopper Emory (1841–1916), American politician
- Daniel Hopwood, English interior designer
- Daniel Horák (born 2000), Czech footballer
- Daniel Horan (born 1983), American Catholic academic
- Daniel Horlaville (1945–2019), French footballer
- Daniel Horne, American artist
- Daniel Horowitz (born 1954), American lawyer
- Daniel Horry, American politician
- Daniel Horsmanden (1691–1778), American judge
- Daniel Horton, multiple people
- Dániel Horváth (born 1996), Hungarian footballer
- Daniel G. Horvitz (1921–2008), American survey statistician
- Daniel Hotchkis (born 1985), Australian field hockey player
- Daniel Hotz, Swiss orienteering competitor
- Daniel Hough (1825–1861), Irish-born American soldier
- Daniel Houghton (born 1998), English cricketer
- Daniel Hourcade (born 1958), Argentine rugby union footballer and coach
- Daniel House (born 1961), American musician and entrepreneur
- Daniel L. Hovland (born 1954), American judge
- Daniel Howard, multiple people
- Daniel Howe, multiple people
- Daniel O. Hoye, American politician
- Daniel Hoyo-Kowalski (born 2003), Polish footballer
- Daniel Hoyt (1681–1764), American politician
- Daniel Hrapmann (born 1989), American football player
- Daniel Hristov (born 1975), Bulgarian footballer
- Daniel Hsia, American film director
- Daniel Hsu (born 1997), American classical pianist
- Daniel Huber, Swiss mathematician and astronomer
- Daniel Huber (ski jumper) (born 1993), Austrian ski jumper
- Daniel Hubmann (born 1983), Swiss orienteering competitor
- Daniel Huck (born 1948), French jazz reedist and singer
- Daniel Hudson (born 1987), American baseball pitcher
- Daniel W. Huff (1854–1940), American politician
- Daniel Hug (1884–1918), Swiss footballer
- Daniel Hugentobler (born 1979), Swiss ice dancer
- Daniel Elliott Huger (1779–1854), American politician
- Daniel Huger (1742–1799), American politician
- Daniel Hughes, multiple people
- Daniel Hugo (born 1955), South African radio announcer
- Daniel Hugunin Jr. (1790–1850), American politician
- Daniel Hulet (1945–2011), Belgian cartoonist
- Daniel Huling (born 1983), American steeplechase runner
- Daniel Hůlka (born 1968, Czech singer and actor
- Daniel Ray Hull (1890–1964), American landscape architect
- Daniel Hulme (born 1979), Australian politician
- Daniel J. Hulme (born 1980), British businessman
- Daniel Humair (born 1938), Swiss drummer, composer and painter
- Daniel Humbarger, American stand-up comedian
- Daniel Humm (born 1976), Swiss chef and restaurateur
- Daniel Huňa (born 1979), Czech footballer
- Daniel J. Hunt, American politician
- Daniel Hünten (1760–1823), German guitarist, organist and composer
- Daniel Hunter, multiple people
- Daniel Huntington, multiple people
- Daniel Hurley, multiple people
- Daniel Hurst (1876–1961), English footballer
- Daniel Huss (born 1979), Luxembourgish footballer
- Daniel Huston, multiple people
- Daniel Hutchinson, Irish politician
- Daniel Huttenlocher, American computer scientist
- Daniel Huttlestone (born 1999), English actor
- Daniel Hutto, American philosopher
- Daniel Huws, Welsh historian
- Daniel Huwyler (born 1963), Swiss cyclist
- Daniel Huybrechts (born 1966), German mathematician
- Daniel Henry Huyett III (1921–1998), American judge
- Daniel Huza (born 1970), Romanian footballer
- Daniel Hwang (1953–2022), Taiwanese politician
- Daniel Hyatt (1930–2015), Canadian actor
- Daniel Hyde, multiple people
- Daniel E. Hydrick (1860–1921), American judge
- Daniel Hynes (born 1968), American politician

== I ==
- Daniel Ianuș (born 1987), Romanian rugby union player
- Daniel Ibañes (born 1976), Spanish futsal player
- Daniel Ibáñez (born 1995), Argentine footballer
- Daniel Ibáñez (actor) (born 1995), Spanish actor
- Daniel Iffla (1825–1907), French philanthropist
- Daniel Iftodi (born 1968), Romanian footballer
- Daniel Igali (born 1974), Nigerian-Canadian wrestler
- Daniel Igbinedion (born 1995), English rugby league player
- Daniel Iglesias (born 1962), Argentine wrestler
- Daniel Iglesias Jr., American filmmaker and video director
- Daníel Þór Ingason (born 1995), Icelandic handball player
- Daniel Ilabaca (born 1988), British freerunner
- Daniel Iley (born 1996), Scottish gymnast
- Dániel Illyés (born 1982), Hungarian footballer
- Daniel Ilsley (1740–1813), American politician
- Daniel Im (born 1985), American golfer
- Daniel Imbert (1952–2016), Mauritian footballer
- Daniel Imhof (born 1977), Swiss-born Canadian soccer player
- Daniel Immerwahr (born 1980), American historian
- Daniel Imperiale (born 1988), Argentine footballer
- Daniel Ingalls, multiple people
- Daniel Ingram, multiple people
- Daniel Ings (born 1985), British actor
- Daniel Inman (born 1947), professor of aerospace engineering
- Daniel Innes (1835–1918), American politician
- Daniel Innes (artist), Canadian artist
- Daniel Inocente, American architect and space architect
- Daniel Inouye (1924–2012), American politician and World War II veteran
- Daniel Ioniță, multiple people
- Daniel Iron, Canadian film and television producer
- Daniel Irujo Urra, Spanish lawyer
- Daniel Irvine (born 1982), Australian rugby league footballer and coach
- Daniel K. Isaac (born 1988), American actor
- Daniel Isaachsen, multiple people
- Daniel Isăilă (born 1972), Romanian footballer
- Daniel Ischdonat (born 1976), German footballer
- Daniel Isengart, American singer
- Daniel Islas (born 1979), Argentine footballer
- Daniel Islas Arroyo (born 1992), Mexican diver
- Daniel Shaga Ismaila (born 1954), 29th paramount ruler of the Bwatiye people
- Daniel Israel (1859–1901), Austrian painter
- Daniel Issa, American politician
- Daniel Itodo (born 1996), Nigerian footballer
- Daniel Itzig (1723–1799), German banker
- Daniel Ivancho (1908–1972), American bishop
- Daniel Ivandjiiski (born 1978), Bulgarian investment banker
- Daniel Ivankovich (born 1963), American orthopedic surgeon
- Daniel Ivanov, multiple people
- Daniel Ivanovski (born 1983), Macedonian football player
- Daniel Ivascyn, American businessman
- Daniel Ivernel (1920–1999), French actor
- Daniel Iversen (born 1997), Danish footballer
- Daniel Ivey-Soto, American politician
- Daniel Ivin (1932–2021), Croatian writer
- Daniel Izere, Rwandan record producer

== J ==
- Daniel Ernst Jablonski, German theologian
- Daniel C. Jackling (1869–1956), American mining engineer
- Daniel Jackson, several people
- Daniel Jacobs, multiple people
- Daniel Jacobson, multiple people
- Daniel Jacoby (1933–2020), French lawyer
- Daniel Jadue (born 1967), Chilean politician
- Daniel Jaffe, American astronomer
- Daniel Joseph Jaffé (1876–1921), British civil engineer
- Daniel L. Jafferis (born 1983), American theoretical physicist
- Daniel Jakiel (born 1990), Zimbabwean-born Malawian cricketer
- Daniel Toft Jakobsen (born 1978), Danish politician
- Daníel Jakobsson (born 1973), Icelandic cross-country skier
- Daniel Jamatia (born 1963), Indian politician
- Daniel James, several people
- Daniel Jammer (born 1966), German-Israeli businessman
- Daniel du Janerand (1919–1990), French painter
- Daniel Janevski (born 1992), Swedish footballer
- Daniel Janies (born 1966), American biologist
- Dániel Jankovics (born 1995), Hungarian athlete
- Daniel Janner (born 1957), British lawyer
- Daniel Jansen, multiple people
- Daniel Janssens (1925–2004), Belgian middle-distance runner
- Daniel Jansson (born 1979), Finnish basketball coach
- Daniel Januske (1661–1724), Jesuit missionary
- Daniel H. Janzen (born 1939), American evolutionary ecologist and conservationist
- Daniel Japonês (born 1986), Brazilian futsal player
- Daniel Jara Martínez (born 1993), Paraguayan footballer
- Daniel Jaramillo (born 1991), Colombian bicycle racer
- Daniel Jarl (born 1992), Swedish footballer
- Daniel Jarque (1983–2009), Spanish footballer
- Daniel Jarrett (1886 or 1894–1938), American actor
- Daniel Jarvis (1935–2021), Canadian politician
- Daniel Jasinski (born 1989), German discus thrower
- Daniel Laemouahuma Jatta, Jola scholar and musician
- Daniel Javier, multiple people
- Daniel Jay (born 1954), American politician
- Daniel Jean, Canadian political consultant
- Daniel Jean (judoka) (born 1997), French judoka
- Daniel Jeandupeux (born 1949), Swiss footballer and manager
- Daniel Jebbison (born 2003), Canadian football player
- Daniel Jędraszko (born 1976), Polish canoeist
- Daniel Jefferies (born 1999), Welsh footballer
- Daniel Jeleniewski (born 1983), Polish speedway rider
- Daniel Jelensperger (1799–1831), French musicologist
- Daniel Jelišić (born 2000), German footballer
- Daniel Jenifer (1791–1855), American politician
- Daniel Jenkins (born 1963), American actor
- Daniel R. Jenky (born 1947), American Catholic prelate
- Daniel Jensen (born 1979), Danish footballer
- Daniel Jensen (born 1985), Danish footballer
- Daniel Jere (born 1986), Zambian chess player
- Daniel Jeremiah (born 1977), American football analyst and writer
- Daniel Jérent (born 1991), French fencer
- Daniel Jervis (born 1996), British swimmer
- Daniel R. Jeske, American statistician
- Daniel Jesus (born 1998), Brazilian footballer
- Daniel Jewel, English film producer and director
- Daniel T. Jewett (1807–1906), American lawyer and politician
- Daniel Jillings (born 1982), English actor
- Daniel Jiménez, multiple people
- Daniel Job (born 2005), Nigerian footballer
- Daniel Jobim (born 1973), Brazilian singer and pianist
- Daniel Jobin, Canadian cinematographer
- Daniel Jocelyn (born 1970), New Zealand equestrian
- Daniel Jodah (born 1995), Canadian-Guyanese soccer player
- Daniel Joe (born 1990), Papua New Guinean footballer
- Daniel Johan (born 1972), Indonesian politician
- Daniel Jóhannesson (born 2007), Icelandic footballer
- Daniel Johannsen (born 1978), Austrian tenor
- Daniel Johansen, multiple people
- Daniel Johansson, multiple people
- Daniel Johns (born 1979), Australian vocalist, composer, guitarist and pianist
- Daniel Johnson, several people
- Daniel Johnston, multiple people
- Daniel Jolliffe (1964–2021), Canadian media artist
- Daniel Jones, multiple people
- Daniël de Jong (born 1992), Dutch racing driver
- Daniel Jonsson (1599–1663), Swedish soldier
- Daniel Jordan, multiple people
- Daniel Jorge (born 1959), Uruguayan rower
- Daniel Jorgensen, multiple people
- Daniel Josefsson (born 1981), Swedish ice hockey player
- Daniel Joseph (born 1997), Canadian gridiron football player
- Daniel D. Joseph (1929–2011), American mechanical engineer
- Daniel Jositsch (born 1965), Swiss law professor and politician
- Daniel Jouanneau (born 1946), French diplomat
- Daniel Joulani (born 2003), Ukrainian footballer
- Daniel Jouseff, Swedish artist
- Daniel Joyce (born 1961), Australian male curler
- Daniel Juárez, multiple people
- Daniel Jubb, British rocket scientist
- Daniel Judah (born 1977), American boxer
- Daniel K. Judd (born 1956), American educator and religious leader
- Daniel Bremer Juell (1808–1855), Norwegian politician
- Daniel Bremer Juell Koren (1858–1948), Norwegian politician
- Dániel Juhász (born 1992), Hungarian footballer
- Daniel Junas (born 1962), Slovak actor and musician
- Daniel Juncadella (born 1991), Spanish racing driver
- Daniel Junge, American documentary filmmaker
- Daniel Jungwirth (born 1982), German footballer
- Daniel Júnior (born 2002), Brazilian footballer
- Daniel Jurč (born 1983), Slovak footballer
- Daniel Jurgeleit (born 1963), German footballer
- Daniel Juslenius, Finnish writer and bishop
- Daniel Juster (born 1947), American Messianic Judaism
- Daniel Heath Justice (born 1975), American-born Canadian academic and citizen of the Cherokee Nation
- Daniel Jutras, Canadian academic administrator and law teacher
- Daniel Jütte, Israeli historian

== K ==
- Daniël van Kaam (born 2000), Dutch footballer
- Daniel Kaczorowski (born 1952), French rugby union player
- Daniel Kagan (born 1953), American politician
- Daniel Kaha (born 1989), Israeli footballer
- Daniel Kahl (born 1960), American television personality
- Daniel Kahneman (1934–2024), Israeli psychologist and Nobel laureate
- Daniel Kaiser, multiple people
- Daniel Kajmakoski (born 1983), Macedonian singer
- Daniel Kajzer (born 1992), Polish footballer
- Daniel Kalinaki (born 1980), Ugandan journalist
- Daniel Kalla (born 1966), Canadian author and physician
- Daniel Kalonga, Malawian Anglican bishop
- Daniel Kaluuya (born 1989), English actor and writer
- Daniel Kamau (born 1949), Kenyan musician
- Daniel Kammen (born 1962), American scientist
- Daniel Kamy (born 1996), Cameroonian footballer
- Daniel Kandi (born 1983), Danish trance producer
- Daniel Kandlbauer (born 1983), Swiss pop musician
- Daniel Kane, multiple people
- Daniel Kang, South Korean singer and member of boy group Wanna One
- Daniel Kaniewski, American politician
- Daniel Kanu, multiple people
- Daniel Kanza, Congolese politician
- Daniel Kaplan, multiple people
- Daniel Karaba, Kenyan politician
- Daniel L. Karbler (born 1963), U. S. Army lieutenant general
- Daniel Karcher, American film producer
- Daniel Karlin, British literary scholar
- Daniel Karlsbakk (born 2003), Norwegian footballer
- Daniel Karrais (born 1990), German politician
- Daniel Karrenberg (born 1959), German computer scientist
- Daniel Kartheininger (born 1992), German motorcycle racer
- Daniel Kasende (born 1995), Congolese rugby union player
- Daniel Kash (born 1959), Canadian actor and film actor
- Daniel Kastler (1926–2015), French physicist
- Daniel Kastner (born 1981), Austrian football player
- Daniel L. Kastner (born 1951), American physician and researcher
- Dániel Kasza (born 1994), Hungarian footballer
- Daniel Katz, multiple people
- Daniel Katzen, American musician
- Daniel Kaufman, American screenwriter
- Daniel Kaufmann, multiple people
- Daniel Kaven, American artist and designer
- Daniel Kawczynski (born 1972), British politician
- Daniel Keane (born 1951), New Zealand rower
- Daniel Kearney (born 1989), Irish hurler
- Daniel Kearns, multiple people
- Daniel Keating, multiple people
- Daniel Kebede, British trade unionist
- Daniel F. Keenan (born 1961), American politician
- Daniel Keene, Australian playwright
- Daniel Kehlmann (born 1975), German-language novelist
- Daniel Keighran (born 1983), Australian soldier and Victoria Cross recipient
- Daniel Keilwitz (born 1989), German racing driver
- Daniel A. Keim, German computer scientist
- Daniel Keita-Ruel (born 1989), German footballer
- Daniel Keith (born 1982), American actor, director, writer, and producer
- Daniel Kelaart (born 1986), Australian musical artist
- Daniel J. Kelleher (1864–1929), American lawyer
- Daniel Keller (born 1992), American soccer player
- Daniel Kelley, multiple people
- Daniel Kellison (born 1964), American film producer
- Daniel Kellogg, multiple people
- Daniel Kelly, multiple people
- Daniel Kemmis (born 1945), American politician
- Daniel Kemp, multiple people
- Daniel Kenedy (born 1974), Portuguese footballer
- Daniel Kenrick, English physician and poet
- Daniel Kennedy, multiple people
- Daniel Kerr (politician) (1836–1916), American politician
- Daniel Kerr (born 1983), Australian rules footballer
- Daniel Kerrigan, multiple people
- Daniel Kerschbaumer (born 1989), Austrian footballer
- Daniel Kessler, multiple people
- Daniel Warren Ketcham (1867–1935), United States Army general
- Daniel Ketchedjian (born 1979), Uruguayan magician and television personality
- Daniel Kevles (born 1939), American historian
- Daniel Keyes (1927–2014), American author
- Daniel Keys Moran (born 1962), American novelist
- Daniel Khalife (born 2001), British soldier and escaped prisoner
- Daniel Kholodny, Russian political prisoner
- Daniel Khomskii (1938–2024), German physicist
- Daniel Kibblesmith (born 1983), American writer and comedian
- Daniel Kibret, Ethiopian politician
- Daniel Kickert (born 1983), Australian basketball player
- Daniel Kidane (born 1986), British composer
- Daniel Kidega (born 1973), Ugandan politician
- Daniel J. Kihano (1933–2000), American businessman and politician
- Daniel Kilgore, multiple people
- Daniel Kilioni (born 1993), Tongan rugby union player
- Daniel Killer (born 1949), Argentine footballer
- Daniel Kim, multiple people
- Daniel Kimaiyo (born 1948), Kenyan hurdler
- Daniel M. Kimmel, American film critic and author
- Daniel Kimoni (born 1971), Belgian footballer
- Daniel Kinahan (born 1977), Irish sports promoter and suspected crime boss
- Daniel Kinate, American politician
- Daniel Kinet (1884–1910), Belgian aviator
- Daniel King, multiple people
- Daniel King-Turner (born 1984), New Zealand tennis player
- Daniel L. Kinnaman (1933–2025), American politician
- Daniel Kinsey (1902–1970), American athlete
- Daniel Kinumbe (born 1999), Canadian soccer player
- Daniel Kirkley (born 1979), American Christian musician
- Daniel Kirkpatrick (born 1988), New Zealand rugby union player
- Daniel Kirkwood (1867–1928), Scottish football player, director and chairman
- Daniel Kirkwood (1814–1895), American astronomer
- Daniel Kish, American educator
- Dániel Kiss, multiple people
- Daniel Kistler (born 1962), Swiss judoka
- Daniel Kitson (born 1977), English comedian
- Daniel Kjörling (born 1973), Swedish bandy player
- Daniel Klajner (born 1963), Swiss conductor
- Daniel Klatt (born 1978), American water polo player and coach
- Daniel Klein, multiple people
- Daniel Kleinman (born 1955), English director
- Daniel Kleitman (born 1934), American mathematician
- Daniel Klem, American ornithologist
- Daniel Kleppner (1932–2025), American physicist
- Daniel Klewer (born 1977), German footballer
- Daniel Klicnik (born 2003), Austrian footballer
- Daniel Klíma (born 2002), Czech speedway rider
- Daniel J. Klionsky, American biochemist and molecular biologist
- Daniel Klose (born 1979), German darts player
- Daniel Kluger (1951–2025), Israeli writer
- Daniel Kluger (composer), American composer, orchestrator, music producer and sound designer
- Daniel Klute, American rocket scientist
- Daniel Knauf (born 1958), American writer
- Daniel G. Knauss, American lawyer
- Daniel Ridgway Knight (1839–1924), American painter
- Daniel Knobel (1936–2021), South African general and doctor
- Daniel Danielsen Knoff (1614–1687), Dano-Norwegian civil servant and politician
- Daniel Knost (born 1978), American stock car racing crew chief
- Daniel G. Knowlton (1922–2015), American bookbinder
- Daniel Knox, 6th Earl of Ranfurly (1914–1988), British Army officer and farmer
- Daniel Knox (born 1980), American singer-songwriter
- Daniel Knudsen (born 1988), American actor
- Daniel Knuth (1945–2020), American politician
- Daniel Kobialka (1943–2021), American musician
- Daniel Köbler (born 1981), German politician
- Daniel Koch, multiple people
- Daniel Koerhuis (born 1981), Dutch politician
- Daniel Koffi-Konan (born 1981), Ivorian footballer
- Dániel Kóger (born 1989), Hungarian ice hockey player
- Daniel Kogler (born 1988), Austrian footballer
- Daniel Koh (born 1985), American politician
- Daniel Kokosiński (born 1985), Polish footballer
- Daniel Kokotajlo (director) (born 1980 or 1981), British film director
- Daniel Kokotajlo (researcher), artificial intelligence researcher
- Daniel Kolak, Croatian-American philosopher
- Daniel Kolář (born 1985), Czech footballer
- Daniel Kölbl (born 1993), German politician
- Daniel Kolenda, American missionary
- Daniel Kollar (born 1994), Finnish footballer
- Daniel Köllerer (born 1983), Austrian tennis player
- Daniel S. Koltun (1933–2014), American theoretical physicist
- Daniel N'Gom Kome (born 1980), Cameroonian footballer
- Daniel Kipchirchir Komen (born 1984), Kenyan middle-distance runner
- Daniel Komen (born 1976), Kenya runner
- Daniel Končal (born 1982), Slovak volleyball player
- Daniel de Koninck, Dutch painter
- Dániel Köntös (born 1984), Hungarian footballer
- Daniel Kopál (1970–2020), Czech chef, radio and television presenter
- Daniel Kopans, American radiologist
- Daniel Koperberg (born 1997), Israeli basketball player
- Daniel Koprivcic (born 1981), New Zealand footballer
- Daniel Koren (born 1984), Israeli musician, comedian and director
- Daniel Korski (born 1977), Danish-British political advisor
- Daniel Kosakowski (born 1992), American tennis player
- Daniel Kosek (born 2001), Czech footballer
- Daniel E. Koshland, multiple people
- Daniel Koskipalo (born 2003), Finnish footballer
- Daniel Kosonen (born 2000), Finnish high jumper
- Daniel Köstl (born 1998), Czech footballer
- Daniel Kottke (born 1954), American computer engineer
- Daniel Kotyza (born 2000), Czech athlete
- Daniel Kötze (born 1987), French rugby union player
- Daniel Koum (born 1985), Australian weightlifter
- Daniel Kountz (born 1978), American actor and realtor
- Daniel Kovac (born 1956), German-Slovenian singer
- Dániel Kovács, multiple people
- Dániel Kővágó (born 1990), Hungarian guitarist, producer and DJ
- Daniel Kowalski (born 1975), Australian swimmer
- Daniel Kozelinski Netto (born 1952), Ukrainian bishop
- Daniel Koziarski (born 1979), Polish novelist and lawyer
- Daniel Kraft, American businessman
- Daniel Kráľ (born 1978), Czech mathematician and computer scientist
- Daniel Kramer (photographer) (1932–2024), American photographer
- Daniel Kramer (born 1977), American-born theatre, opera and dance director
- Daniel Kraus, multiple people
- Daniel Krch (born 1992), Czech footballer
- Daniel Krčmář (born 1971), Slovak biathlete
- Daniel Krejčí (born 1992), Czech ice hockey player
- Daniel J. Kremer (born 1937), American judge
- Daniel Krencker (1874–1941), Alsatian-German architect
- Daniel Krenželok (born 1997), Czech ice hockey player
- Daniel H. Kress (1862–1956), Canadian physician, anti-smoking activist, Seventh-day Adventist missionary and vegetarian
- Daniel Kressner (born 1978), German numerically analyst
- Daniel Křetínský (born 1975), Czech businessman and lawyer
- Daniel Kretschmar, German journalist
- Daniel Kreutzer (born 1979), German ice hockey player
- Daniel Kreutzfeldt (born 1987), Danish cyclist
- Daniel Krezic (born 1996), Macedonian footballer
- Daniel Kriegman, American psychologist
- Daniel Krige (born 1970), Australian film director
- Daniel Krištof (1979–2025), Czech politician
- Daniel Kritenbrink, American diplomat
- Daniel Krnćević (1929–1983), Croatian rower
- Daniel Kroening (born 1975), German computer scientist
- Daniel Krolik (born 1977), Canadian actor
- Daniel Kroneberger (born 1961), Argentine politician
- Daniel Krueger, American swimmer
- Daniel Kruger (born 1974), British politician
- Daniel M. Krumrei, first chaplain to serve as an adjutant general
- Daniël Krutzen (born 1996), Belgian footballer
- Daniel T. Ksepka, American paleontologist
- Daniel Kubert (1947–2010), American mathematician
- Daniel Kubeš (born 1978), Czech handball coach
- Daniel Küblböck (1985–2018), German pop-singer and actor
- Daniel Kucan (born 1970), American interior designer
- Daniel Kucera (1923–2017), American Catholic bishop
- Daniel Kunce (born 1971), German ice hockey player
- Daniel Kunene, South African literary scholar
- Daniel Kupsin (born 1977), Russian businessman
- Daniel Marco Kur Adwok (born 1952), Sudanese Catholic prelate
- Daniel Kurganov (born 1986), American violinist and educator
- Daniel Ludlow Kuri (born 1961), Mexican politician
- Daniel Kuritzkes, American physician
- Daniel C. Kurtzer (born 1949), American diplomat
- Daniel Kutev (born 1991), Bulgarian footballer
- Daniel Kuzemka (born 1998), American soccer player
- Daniel Kuzniecka (born 1965), Argentine screenwriter, producer and actor
- Daniel Kvande (born 1995), Norwegian footballer
- Daniel Kwamou (born 2002), Canadian gridiron football player
- Daniel Enele Kwanairara (1947–2012), Solomon Islands politician
- Daniel Kwele, Motswana politician
- Daniel Kyerewaa (born 2001), German footballer
- Daniel Kyriakides (born 1995), Welsh field hockey player
- Daniel Kysela (born 1970), Czech ice hockey defenseman

== L ==
- Daniel La Spata (born 1981), American politician
- Daniel E. LaBar (1857–1939), American politician
- Daniel Lacalle (born 1967), Spanish economist
- Daniel Lacambre, American cinematographer
- Daniel Lăcătuș (born 1988), Romanian journalist and poet
- Daniel Lacroix (born 1969), Canadian ice hockey player
- D. M. Ladd (1903–1960), Federal Bureau Investigation agent
- Daniel Ladinsky, American poet
- Daniel F. Lafean (1861–1922), American politician
- Daniel Lafferty (born 1989), Northern Irish footballer
- Daniel Lagache (1903–1972), French psychiatrist and psychoanalyst
- Daniel Lind Lagerlöf (1969–2011), Swedish director, screenwriter and producer
- Daniel Laidlaw (1875–1950), Scottish piper and Victoria Cross recipient
- Daniel Laing Jr., American physician
- Daniel Lajud (born 1999), Mexican-Lebanese association football player
- Daniel Lakens (born 1980), Dutch experimental psychologist
- Daniel Lalhlimpuia (born 1997), Indian footballer
- Daniel Lalonde, Canadian businessperson
- Daniel Lam (1922–2007), Hong Kong businessman
- Daniel Lamarre, Canadian businessman
- Daniel Lamb-Hunt (born 1987), New Zealand-German baseball player
- Daniel Lambert, multiple people
- Daniel Lambo (born 1968), Belgian film director, film producer and screenwriter
- Daniel S. Lamont (1851–1905), American politician
- Daniel Lanata (born 1966), Argentine football manager
- Daniel Landa (born 1968), Czech musician and actor
- Daniel Landau (born 1973), Israeli artist, researcher and entrepreneur
- Daniel Landes, American rabbi
- Daniel Landin, British cinematographer
- Daniel Lang, multiple people
- Daniel Langan (1910–1985), Irish rugby union player
- Daniel Langhamer (born 2003), Czech footballer
- Daniel Langhorne (died 1681), English antiquarian
- Daniel D. Langleben, American psychiatrist
- Daniel Lara, subject of the 2016 Damn Daniel internet meme
- Daniel Langlois (1957–2023), Canadian businessman
- Daniel Langrand (1921–1998), French footballer
- Daniel Langre (born 1981), Mexican tennis player
- Daniel Langton, American historian
- Daniel Lanois (born 1951), Canadian record producer and musician
- Daniel Lapaine (born 1971), Australian actor
- Daniel Laperrière (born 1969), Canadian ice hockey player
- Daniel Lapin (boxer) (born 1997), Ukrainian boxer
- Daniel Lapin (born 1947), American rabbi
- Daniel LaPlante, American convicted murder
- Daniel Lapp (born 1965), Canadian musician
- Daniel Lapsley, American developmental and educational psychologist
- Daniel L. LaRocque, American judge
- Daniel Larsen, multiple people
- Daniel Larsson, multiple people
- Daniel Augustus Lartey Jnr. (1926–2009), Ghanaian politician
- Daniel LaRusso (born 1968), protagonist of The Karate Kid media franchise
- Daniel Nii Laryea (born 1987), Ghanaian football referee
- Daniel Lascau (born 1969), German judoka
- Daniel Lascelles, multiple people
- Daniel Lasco (born 1992), American football player
- Daniel J. Lasker (born 1949), American-born Israeli scholar
- Daniel Laskin (1924–2021), American surgeon
- Daniel Lassalle (born 1965), French baroque trombonist
- Daniel Lasure (born 1994), Spanish footballer
- Daniel Conner Lathbury (1831–1922), British newspaper editor and writer
- Daniel Latkowski (born 1991), German footballer
- Daniel Laurent (born 1949), French politician
- Daniel M. Lavery (born 1986), American humorist and blogger
- Daniel Lavielle (1880–1960), French gymnast
- Daniel Lavoie (born 1949), Canadian musician
- Daniel W. Lawler (1859–1926), American lawyer
- Daniel Lawrence, multiple people
- Daniel Lawton (1881–1979), French tennis player
- Daniel Peter Layard, English physician and midwife
- Daniel J. Layton (1879–1960), American judge
- Daniel Layus (born 1984), American musician
- Daniel Lazard (born 1941), French mathematician and computer scientist
- Daniel Leab (1936–2016), American historian
- Daniel Leach (born 1986), Australian soccer player
- Daniel Parkhurst Leadbetter (1797–1870), American politician
- Daniel Leadbitter (born 1990), English footballer
- Daniel Leader, American bread baker
- Daniel P. Leaf, U. S. general
- Daniel Leavitt (1813–1859), American inventor
- Daniel LeBlanc, multiple people
- Daniel Leca (born 1985), French politician
- Daniel Lecce, retired U. S. Marine Corps major general
- Daniel Leck (born 1999), Australian soccer player
- Daniel LeClerc, American politician
- Daniel Leclercq (1949–2019), French footballer and manager
- Daniel Lecourtois (1902–1985), French actor
- Daniel Lede Abal (born 1976), German politician
- Daniel Ledwell, Canadian record producer
- Daniel Lee, multiple people
- Daniel Leech (born 1981), English cricketer
- Daniel Myron LeFever(1835–1906), American gunmaker
- Daniel Légère (1959–2024), Canadian trade unionist
- Daniel Legras (born 1957), French sprint canoer
- Daniel Lehmann (born 1962), Jewish rabbi and theologian
- Daniel Lehner (born 1994), Austrian cyclist
- Daniel Lehu (1896–1979), French swimmer
- Daniel Leino (born 1991), Swedish footballer
- Daniel Leites (born 1982), Uruguayan footballer
- Daniel Lekndreaj (born 1997), Albanian basketball player
- Daniel Lelong (1933–2025), French gallerist and publisher
- Daniel LeMahieu (1946–2022), American politician
- Daniel Lemma (born 1970), Swedish-based musician
- Daniel Lemos (born 1990), Brazilian footballer
- Daniel Lencina-Ribes (born 1977), Spanish tennis player
- Dániel Lengyel (born 1989), Hungarian footballer
- Daniel Lentz (born 1942), America classical composer
- Daniel Leo, multiple people
- Daniel Leon (born 1974), Peruvian-American soccer player
- Daniel Leonard (1740–1829), American loyalist and lawyer
- Daniel Leone (1993–2021), Italian footballer
- Daniel Lerner (1917–1980), American scholar
- Daniel LeRoy (1775–1858), American politician
- D. LeRoy Dresser (1862–1915), American merchant and banker
- Daniel Lessmann (1794–1831), German historian and poet
- Daniel Lessner, American composer and virtuoso pianist
- Daniel Lesur (1908–2002), French organist and composer
- Dániel Lettrich (born 1983), Hungarian footballer
- Daniel Leugner (born 1995), German footballer
- Daniel Levavasseur (born 1948), French fencing master
- Daniel Levey, American fraudster
- Daniel Levi, multiple people
- Daniel Levin, multiple people
- Daniel Levine, multiple people
- Daniel Levinson (1920–1994), American psychologist
- Daniel R. Levinson (born 1949), American lawyer
- Daniel Levitin (born 1957), American psychologist
- Daniel Levy, several people
- Daniel Lewin (1970–2001), Israeli-American entrepreneur
- Daniel Lewis, multiple people
- Daniel Lezama (born 1968), Mexican artist
- Daniel Lhungdim (1940–1998), scholar, songwriter and poet
- Daniel Liberal (born 2000), Angolan footballer
- Daniel Liberzon, professor of electrical anatomy
- Daniel Libeskind (born 1946), American architect
- Daniel Licht (1957–2017), American film composer and musician
- Daniel Lidar, American engineer and astronomer
- Daniel Lidén (born 1980), Swedish drummer and musician
- Daniel Lieberman (born 1964), American paleoanthropologist
- Daniel Liénard de Beaujeu (1711–1755), French officer during the Seven Years' War
- Daniel Lienert-Brown (born 1993), New Zealand rugby union player
- Daniel Liew (born 1981), Singaporean swimmer
- Daniel Lifshitz (born 1988), Israeli footballer
- Dániel Ligeti (born 1989), Hungarian freestyle wrestler
- Daniel Lightwing, mathematician child prodigy
- Daniel Lilayu (born 1949), Chilean politician
- Daniel T. Lilley (1920–1996), American politician
- Daniel Lima (born 1980), Brazilian martial artist
- Daniel Lincoln, multiple people
- Daniel Lind-Ramos, Puerto Rican artist
- Daniel Lindemann (born 1985), German television personality
- Daniel Lindenschmid (born 1992), German politician
- Daniel Lindley (1801–1880), American missionary
- Daniel Lindsay, American documentary filmmaker
- Daniel Lindström (born 1978), Swedish singer
- Daniel Ling (1926–2003), Canadian academic
- Daniel Lins Côrtes (born 1979), Brazilian footballer
- Daniel Chipman Linsley (1827–1889), American engineer, businessman, author and political figure
- Daniel Linville, American politician
- Daniel Lipman (born 1950), American screenwriter
- Daniel Lipšic (born 1973), Slovak politician and jurist
- Daniel Lismore (born 1984), British artist
- Daniel Lissing (born 1981), Australian actor
- Daniel Liston, Irish member of the Congregation of the Holy Spirit
- Daniel Lisulo (1930–2000), Zambian politician
- Daniel Liszka (born 2000), Polish footballer
- Daniel Litman (born 1990), Israeli film and television actor
- Daniel Littau (born 1991), German actor
- Daniel Little, American philosopher
- Daniel Littlefield (1822–1891), American politician
- Daniel Livermore, Canadian academic and historian
- Daniel Livingston (1840–1888), Australian politician
- Daniel Liw (born 1979), Swedish bandy player
- Daniel Ljunggren (born 1994), Swedish ice hockey player
- Daniel Ljungkvist (born 1981), Swedish ice hockey player
- Daniel Ljungman (born 2002), Swedish ice hockey player
- Daniel Llambrich Gabriel (born 1975), Spanish Paralympic swimmer
- Daniel Lloyd, multiple people
- Daniel Lobb (died 2019), British designer
- Daniel Lobell, American stand-up comedian
- Daniel Löble (born 1973), Swiss-German drummer
- Daniel Cameron Lochead (1878–1946), Canadian politician
- Daniel N. Lockwood (1841–1906), American politician
- Daniel S. Loeb (born 1961), American businessman
- Daniel Loftus, Irish hurler
- Daniel Logan (born 1987), New Zealand actor
- Daniel Casper von Lohenstein (1635–1683), German writer
- Daniel Lombroso, American documentary filmmaker and journalist
- Daniel A. Lomino, American production designer and art director
- Daniel Lomotey (born 1999), Ghanaian footballer
- Daniel Londas (born 1954), French boxer
- Daniel London (born 1973), American actor
- Daniel Londoño, multiple people
- Daniel Lönn (born 2001), Swedish politician
- Daniel Friedrich Loos (1735–1819), German medallist
- Daniel Lopar (born 1985), Swiss footballer
- Daniel Loper (born 1982), American football player
- Daniel Lopes (born 1976), German-Brazilian singer
- Daniel López, several people
- Daniel Lord (1795–1868), American attorney
- Daniel A. Lord (1888–1955), American Jesuit priest
- Daniel Lorenzetti, American author and documentary photographer
- Daniel Lorer (born 1976), Bulgarian politician
- Daniel Losquadro (born 1972), American politician
- Daniel Loss (born 1958), Swiss theoretical physicist
- Daniel Lothian (1815–1892), American politician
- Daniel Lothrop (1831–1892), American publisher
- Daniel Louis (born 1953), Canadian film producer
- Daniel Louvard (born 1948), French scientist
- Daniel Lovell, English imprisoned journalist
- Daniel Lovera (born 1965), Argentine politician
- Daniel Lovinho (born 1989), Brazilian footballer
- Daniel Lovitz (born 1991), American soccer player
- Daniel Lowe (born 1992), American sports shooter
- Daniel Lowenstein, multiple people
- Daniel H. Lownsdale, American politician
- Daniel Loxton, Canadian writer
- Daniel Lozada, Peruvian economist and politician
- Daniel Lozakovich (born 2001), Swedish violinist
- Daniel Lu (born 2001), Chinese racing driver
- Daniel Lubetkin (1931–2024), American lawyer and politician
- Daniel Lubetzky, Mexican-American billionaire businessman, philanthropist, author, founder and executive chairman
- Daniel Lucas, multiple people
- Daniel R. Lucey, American infectious disease physician
- Daniel Lück (born 1991), German footballer
- Daniel Łuczak (born 1996), Polish footballer
- Daniel Ludlow, multiple people
- Daniel Ludueña (born 1982), Argentine footballer
- Daniel Ludwig, multiple people
- Daniel Lugay, Dominican politician
- Daniel Lugo, multiple people
- Dániel Lukács (born 1996), Hungarian footballer
- Daniel Łukasik (born 1991), Polish footballer
- Daniel Lum On (born 1962), Fijian lawn bowler
- Daniel Luna (born 2003), Colombian footballer
- Daniel Lunan (born 1984), English footballer
- Daniel Lundby, American politician
- Daniel Lundgaard (born 2000), Danish badminton player
- Daniel Lundh, Franco-Swedish actor and writer
- Daniel Lung (born 1987), Romanian footballer
- Daniel Lungu (born 1998), Moldovan weightlifter
- Daniel Lupașcu (born 1981), Romanian footballer
- Daniel Lupi, English film producer
- Daniel Lurie (born 1977), American politician and philanthropist
- Daniel Lusk (born 1938), American poet
- Daniel Lutaaya, Ugandan journalist
- Daniel Luton (1821–1901), Canadian politician
- Daniel Freiherr von Lützow (born 1974), German politician
- Daniel Luxbacher (born 1992), Austrian footballer
- Daniel Lyman (1756–1830), American judge
- Daniel Lyman (loyalist) (1753–1809), Canadian politician
- Daniel Lynch, several people
- Daniel Lynd (born 1994), American soccer player
- Daniel Lyon, multiple people
- Daniel Lyons, multiple people
- Daniel Lysacht, Irish Anglican priest
- Daniel Lysons, multiple people

== M ==
- Daniel Maa Boumsong (born 1987), Cameroonian footballer
- Daniel Maartens (born 1995), South African rugby union player
- Daniel MacAleese (1833–1900), Irish politician
- Daniel Macarin, New Zealand visual effects artist
- Daniel MacArthur, Australian geneticist
- Daniel MacCarthy Glas (1807–1884), London-born Irish writer
- Daniel MacCarthy Reagh (died 1641), Irish MP
- Daniel MacDonald, multiple people
- Daniel Trembly MacDougal (1865–1958), American botanist and writer
- Daniel Mace, multiple people
- Daniel Mach (born 1955), French politician
- Daniel Machacón (born 1985), Colombian footballer
- Daniel Machator, Ghanaian politician and journalist
- Daniel Machek (born 1959), Czech swimmer
- Daniel Machover (born 1963), British lawyer
- Daniel MacIvor (born 1962), Canadian actor and director
- Daniel Mack, American World War I soldier
- Daniel MacKay (born 2001), Scottish footballer
- Daniel Mackenzie (born 1935), Kenyan sailor
- Daniel R. Mackesey (born 1954), American lawyer
- Daniel MacKinnon, multiple people
- Daniel Mackintosh (1815–1891), Scottish geomorphologist
- Daniel MacLagan (1904–1991), Scottish zoologist and entomologist
- Daniel Maclise (1806–1870), Irish history, literary, portrait painter and illustrator
- Daniel G. MacMartin (1844–1923), Canadian civil servant
- Daniel MacMaster (1968–2008), Canadian singer
- Daniel Macmillan, multiple people
- Daniel Macnee (1806–1882), Scottish portrait painter
- Daniel MacNeill (1885–1946), Canadian politician
- Daniel Macovei (born 1992), Romanian swimmer
- Daniel MacParland, Irish politician
- Daniel MacPherson (born 1980), Australian actor
- Daniel Maddy-Weitzman (born 1986), Israeli baseball player
- Daniel Maderner (born 1995), Austrian footballer
- Daniel Madigan, Jesuit priest and Quranic studies scholar
- Daniel Madland (born 1977), Kurdish singer and television host
- Daniel Madlener (born 1964), Austrian football manager
- Daniel Madwed (born 1989), American swimmer
- Daniel Madzimbamuto, Southern Rhodesian activist
- Daniel Maechler (born 1974), Swiss skeleton racer
- Daniel Maffia (born 1937), French-American visual artist
- Daniel Magariel, American novelist
- Dániel Magay (born 1932), Hungarian Olympic champion fencer
- Daniel Magda (born 1997), Slovak footballer
- Daniel Magder (born 1991), Canadian actor
- Daniel Mageean (1882–1962), Irish Roman Catholic prelate
- Daniel Maggs, South African architect and artist
- Daniel Magnusson, multiple people
- Daniel Magone (1829–1904), American lawyer
- Daniel Randall Magruder (1835–1915), judge of the Maryland Court of Appeals
- Daniel Mahaffy (born 2005), English footballer
- Daniel Dung Mahama (born 1979), Ghanaian politician
- Daniel A. Maher (1881–1916), American jockey
- Daniel Mahoney, multiple people
- Daniel James Mahony (1878–1944), Australian scientist
- Daniel Mahrer (born 1962), Swiss alpine skier
- Daniel Maiava, Australian rugby union player
- Daniel Maidman, American painter
- Daniel Maier (born 1968), British comedy writer and television performer
- Daniel Mainwaring (1902–1977), American novelist and screenwriter
- Daniel Majstorović (born 1977), Swedish footballer
- Daniel Mąka (born 1988), Polish footballer
- Daniel Makinde, Nigerian professor
- Daniel Malan (born 1948), South African cricketer
- D. F. Malan (1874–1959), South African politician
- Daniel J. Malarkey (1870–1939), American attorney and politician
- Daniel Maldini (born 2001), Italian footballer
- Daniel Málek (born 1973), Czech breaststroke swimmer
- Daniel Sharpe Malekebu (1889–1978), Malawian doctor, Baptist missionary and anti-colonial activist
- Daniel Malescha (born 1994), German volleyball player
- Daniel Malhue (born 1995), Chilean footballer
- Daniel Malik, Canadian actor and model
- Daniel Mallory, multiple people
- Daniel Maloney (1848–1910), Canadian politician
- Daniel J. Maloney (c. 1879–1905), American pioneering aviator and test pilot
- Daniel Maltzman (born 1963), American artist
- Daniel Mameri (born 1972), Brazilian water polo player
- Daniel Mammana, Argentine footballer
- Daniel Mananta (born 1981), Indonesian actor
- Daniel Manche (born 1993), American actor
- Daniel Mancinelli (born 1988), Italian racing driver
- Daniel Mancini (born 1996), Argentine footballer
- Daniel R. Mandelker, American legal scholar
- Daniel R. Mandell, American historian
- Daniel Mandell (1895–1987), American film editor
- Daniel Mandl (1899–1945), Czech anthroposophist
- Daniel Mandon (1939–2023), French politician
- Daniel Mangrané (1910–1985), Spanish film director
- Daniel Anthony Manion (1942–2024), American judge
- Daniel Mann (lawyer), American lawyer
- Daniel Mann (1912–1991), American stage, film and television director
- Daniel Mannberg (born 1992), Swedish ice hockey player
- Daniel Manning (1831–1887), American businessman
- Daniel P. Mannix (1911–1997), American writer
- Daniel Mannix (1864–1963), Irish-born Catholic archbishop
- Daniel Mañó (1932–2024), Spanish footballer
- Daniel Manohar (born 1974), Indian cricketer
- Daniel Manouchehri (born 1984), Chilean politician
- Daniel Manrique (1939–2010), Mexican artist
- Daniel Mansuy (born 1945), French researcher and chemist
- Daniel Mantenuto (born 1997), Canadian-Italian ice hockey player
- Daniel Manu (born 1970), Australian rugby union player
- Daniel Manz (born 1987), German taekwondo practitioner
- Daniel Manzato (born 1984), Swiss ice hockey player
- Daniel Maramba (1870–1941), Filipino revolutionary and statesman
- Daniel Marco (born 1966), Spanish tennis player
- Daniel Marcos (born 1993), Peruvian mixed martial artist
- Daniel Marcus, American novelist
- Daniel Marcus (lawyer) (born 1941), American lawyer
- Daniel Marcy (1809–1893), American politician
- Daniel Mareček (born 1998), Czech footballer
- Daniel Mărgărit (born 1996), Romanian footballer
- Daniel Margush (born 1997), Australian soccer player
- Daniel Maric (born 1957), French ice hockey player
- Daniel Mariga, Zimbabwean sculptor
- Daniel Marín (born 1974), Spanish footballer
- Daniel Marino (born 1940), Italian-American mobster
- Daniel Marinov(born 2004), Russian artistic gymnast
- Daniel Marins (born 1988), Brazilian footballer
- Daniel Joseph Marion (1945–2022), commissioner of the Northwest Territories
- Daniel Cornel Marivate (1897–1989), South African writer and composer
- Daniel P. Markey (1857–1946), American politician
- Daniel Markovits (born 1969), American legal scholar
- Daniel R. Marlow (born 1954), Canadian physicist
- Daniel Marmenlind (born 1997), Swedish ice hockey player
- Daniel W. Marmon (1844–1909), United States industrialist
- Daniel Marois (born 1968), Canadian ice hockey player
- Daniel Marot (1661–1752), Dutch architect
- Daniel Marques, multiple people
- Daniel Márquez (born 1987), Mexican footballer
- Daniel Marquis, 19th-century Australian photographer
- Daniel Marsden (born 1970), Australian water polo player
- Daniel Marsh, multiple people
- Daniel Marsin (born 1951), French politician
- Daniel Marston, British orienteering competitor
- Daniel Marston (historian) (born 1970), American historian
- Daniel Martens (born 1999), Singaporean footballer
- Daniel Marthin (born 2001), Indonesian badminton player
- Daniel Martí (born 1973), Spanish pole vaulter
- Daniel Martin, several people
- Daniel Martínez, multiple people
- Daniel Martins, multiple people
- Daniel Martynov (born 2006), American figure skater
- Daniel Marx (born 1995), American football player
- Daniel Mas (born 1970), Chilean politician
- Daniel Mašek (born 1969), Czech footballer
- Daniel Maslany (born 1988), Canadian actor
- Daniel Mason, American novelist and physician
- Daniel Gregory Mason (1873–1953), American composer and music critic
- Daniel Massey, multiple people
- Daniel Masson, multiple people
- Daniel Măstăcan (born 1980), Romanian rower
- Daniel Masters (born 1986), English cricketer
- Daniel Mastretta, Mexican engineer and designer
- Daniel Masuch (born 1977), German footballer
- Daniel Filip Mašulovič (born 1998), Slovak footballer
- Daniel Masur (born 1994), German tennis player
- Daniel Matamala (born 1978), Chilean journalist
- Daniel Maté, Spanish billionaire
- Daniel Mateiko (born 1998), Kenyan long-distance runner
- Daniel Matellon (born 1988), Cuban boxer
- Daniel Mateo (born 1989), Spanish long-distance runner
- Daniel Materazzi (born 1985), Portuguese footballer
- Daniel Mathews, multiple people
- Daniel Matsau (born 1977), South African soccer player
- Daniel Matsunaga (born 1988), Brazilian-Filipino model, actor and host
- Daniel Matsuzaka (born 1997), Japanese footballer
- Daniel Matt, multiple people
- Daniel Mattes (born 1972), Austrian businessman
- Daniel Matthews, multiple people
- Daniel Mauch (c. 1477–1540), German sculptor
- Daniel Alexander Maukar (1932–2007), Indonesian Air Force pilot
- Daniel Mavlyutov (born 2004), Turkish-Russian racing driver
- Daniel Maximin (born 1947), French novelist, poet and essayist
- Daniel May, multiple people
- Daniel Mayer (impresario), English musician and politician
- Daniel Mayer (1909–1996), French politician
- Daniel Maynard, multiple people
- Daniel Mayr (born 1995), German basketball player
- Daniel Mays (born 1978), English actor
- Daniel Maze (born 1972), Belgian film director
- Daniel Mazia (1912–1996), American cell biologist
- Daniel Mazur, American mountain climber
- Daniel Mazziotta (born 1988), American professional golfer
- Daniel Mbuizeo (born 1983), South African soccer player
- Daniel McAlister (born 1978), Australian rules footballer
- Daniel McAlpine (1849–1932), Scottish-Australian mycologist
- Daniel McArthur (1867–1943), Scottish footballer
- Daniel McBreen (born 1977), English footballer
- Daniel McBride, multiple people
- Daniel McCaffery (born 1964), American judge
- Daniel T. McCall Jr. (1909–2000), justice of the Supreme Court of Alabama
- Daniel Clive McCallum, Australian film composer, conductor and orchestrator
- Daniel McCallum (1815–1878), Canadian engineer and architect
- Daniel McCann (1957–1988), IRA member
- Daniel McCann (politician) (1887–1954), Canadian politician
- Daniel McCartan, Irish Gaelic footballer
- Daniel McCartney (1817–1887), American mental calculator
- Daniel McCarty, multiple people
- Daniel McCauley, American politician
- Daniel McCay, American politician
- Daniel McClellan, multiple people
- Daniel F. McComas (born 1953), American politician
- Daniel McConnell, multiple people
- Daniel McCook Jr. (1834–1864), American lawyer
- Daniel McCook (1798–1863), American lawyer
- Daniel McCormick, multiple people
- Daniel McCoy, multiple people
- Daniel D. McCracken (1930–2011), American computer scientist
- Daniel McCraney (1834–1885), Canadian politician
- Daniel McCrossan (born 1988), Northern Irish politician
- Daniel McCullers (born 1992), American football player
- Daniel McCurdy (1768–1815), Nova Scotian politician
- Daniel McCutchen (born 1982), American baseball player
- Daniel McDaniel, Australian Army officer
- Daniel McDevitt, multiple people
- Daniel McDonnell (born 1988), American volleyball player
- Daniel McFadden (born 1937), American economist
- Daniel McFarlane, multiple people
- Daniel Michael McGarry (1842–1903), American politician
- Daniel McGee, American statistician
- Daniel McGettigan (1815–1887), Catholic archbishop
- Daniel J. McGillicuddy (1859–1936), American politician
- Daniel A. McGovern (1909–2005), American lieutenant colonel
- Daniel McGowan, multiple people
- Daniel McGrath (1964–2025), Australian professional baseball player
- Daniel M. McGurl (1896–1976), United States Navy admiral
- Daniel McIntosh, multiple people
- Daniel McJunkin (1756–1825), American Revolutionary War patriot
- Daniel McKay (born 1991), Scottish footballer
- Daniel McKellar (1892–1918), Scottish footballer
- Daniel McKenna, multiple people
- Daniel McKenzie, multiple people
- Daniel P. McKiernan, American politician and lawyer
- Daniel McKinney (1898–1956), Irish footballer
- Daniel McKinsey, American dark matter researcher
- Daniel McLachlin (1808–1872), Canadian politician
- Daniel McLaren, multiple people
- Daniel McLaughlin, Irish Gaelic footballer
- Daniel McLaughlin (unionist), American labor unionist
- Daniel McLay (born 1992), British road cyclist
- Daniel McLean, multiple people
- Daniel McLellan (born 1974), Australian surf swimmer and life saving competitor
- Daniel McLeod (1872–1901), Australian cricketer
- Daniel J. McLeod (1849–1930), Canadian politician
- Daniel R. McLeod (1913–1985), American attorney and politician
- Daniel McMahon (1982–2024), American musician
- Daniel McManus (born 2003), Scottish footballer
- Daniel McMaster (1754–1830), Canadian politician
- Daniel McMenamin (1882–1964), Irish politician
- Daniel McMillan, multiple people
- Daniel G. McMullen Jr. (1934–2006), American politician
- Daniel M'Naghten, 19th-century British woodturner
- Daniel Calhoun McNair (born 1961), American businessman and sports executive
- Daniel McNamara (1876–1947), Australian politician
- Daniel McNaughton (1851–1925), Canadian politician
- Daniel McNeely, Canadian politician
- Daniel McNeil, multiple people
- Daniel McNicoll, American film director
- Daniel McNiven, Scottish footballer
- Daniel McPherson (born 1975), Australian rules footballer
- Daniel McStay (born 1995), Australian rules footballer
- Daniel McVey (1892–1972), Australian public servant
- Daniel McVicar (born 1958), American actor, director and writer
- Daniel W. Mead (1862–1948), American engineering consultant and professor
- Daniel Meador (1926–2013), American legal scholar
- Daniel Meadows, British photographer
- Daniel Meaney, Irish hurler
- Daniel Mearns, Scottish shipping merchant
- Daniel Mears, American criminologist
- Daniel Mears (politician) (1819–1906), American politician
- Daniel Mécsery (1759–1823), Hungarian military officer
- Daniel Medina (born 1978), Venezuelan artist
- Daniel Meech (born 1973), New Zealand equestrian
- Daniel Meenan, American basketball player
- Daniel Meja, French dancer
- Daniel Mejía, Puerto Rican beauty pageant titleholder
- Daniel Mejías (1982–2022), Andorran footballer
- Daniel Mekbib (born 1992), Czech squash player
- Daniel Melanderhjelm (1726–1810), Swedish mathematician and astronomer
- Daniel Melingo (born 1957), Argentine musician
- Daniel Mella (born 1976), Uruguayan writer
- Daniel Mellet (1923–2017), Swiss football referee
- Daniel Melnick (1932–2009), American film producer
- Daniel Melo (born 1977), Brazilian tennis player
- Daniel Melo Contreras (born 1979), Chilean politician
- Daniel Meltzer (1951–2015), American lawyer and law professor
- Daniel Wilkie Melvin (1838–1916), Australian auctioneer
- Daniel Menaker (1941–2020), American writer and editor
- Daniel Ménard, Canadian general and executive
- Daniel Menche (born 1969), American experimental musician
- Daniel Mendaille (1885–1963), French actor
- Daniel Mendelsohn (born 1960), American writer
- Daniel Mendes, multiple people
- Daniel Méndez (born 2000), Colombian cyclist
- Daniel Mendoza (1764–1836), English world champion Hall of Fame heavyweight boxer
- Daniel Mengden (born 1993), American baseball player
- D. K. Mensah (1953–2020), Ghanaian banker, economist, and educator
- Daniel Mensah, Ghanaian carpenter and fantasy coffin artist
- Daniel Mensah Kwei (born 1976), Ghanaian sprinter
- Daniël Mensch (born 1978), Dutch rower
- Daniel Menzel (born 1991), Australian rules footballer
- Daniel Mercier (1892–1914), French footballer
- Daniel Mérida (born 2004), Spanish tennis player
- Daniel Mérillon (1852–1925), French sports shooter
- Daniel Merlin Goodbrey (born 1978), British cartoonist
- Daniel Merrett (born 1984), Australian rules footballer
- Daniel Merriam, American painter
- Daniel Francis Merriam (1927–2017), American geologist
- Daniel Merrick (1827–1888), British trade unionist
- Daniel Merriweather (born 1982), Australian singer
- Daniel Mesenhöler (born 1995), German footballer
- Daniel Mesonero (born 2005), Spanish footballer
- Daniel Mesotitsch (born 1976), Austrian biathlete
- Daniel Gottlieb Messerschmidt (1685–1735), German physician, naturalist and geographer
- Daniel Messersi (born 1992), Italian badminton player
- Daniel Messina (born 1962), Argentine-Paraguayan footballer
- Daniel Messinger, American psychologist
- Daniel Mestre (born 1986), Portuguese bicycle racer
- Dániel Mészáros (born 2004), Hungarian swimmer
- Daniel Metge (born 1970), French screenwriter and film director
- Daniel Metropolis (born 1972), Australian rules footballer
- Daniel van der Meulen (1898–1989), Dutch diplomat
- Daniel Meyer, several people
- Daniel Micallef (1928–2022), Maltese diplomat and politician
- Daniel Michalski (born 2000), Polish tennis player
- Daniel Michalski (runner) (born 1995), American athlete
- Daniel Michel (born 1995), Australian boccia player
- Daniel Micka (born 1963), Czech writer and translator
- Daniel Middleton (born 1991), British YouTuber and professional gamer
- Daniel Miehm (born 1960), Canadian Catholic bishop
- Daniel Migliore, American theologian and author
- Daniel Migneault (born 1978), Canadian snowboarder
- Daniel Miguel, Cuban baseball player
- Daniël Mijtens (1590–1647), Dutch painter
- Daniel Mijtens the Younger (1644–1688), Dutch painter
- Daniel Mikic (born 1992), German footballer
- Daniel Miklasevich (born 1997), American rower
- Daniel Mikołajewski, multiple people
- Daniel Milanovski (born 1987), Macedonian basketball player
- Daniel Milavsky (born 2001), American tennis player
- Daniel S. Miles (1772–1845), American Mormon leader
- Daniel Milewski (born 1989), Polish politician
- Daniel Miljanović (born 2001), Swedish footballer
- Daniel Millar, British-Irish actor
- Daniel Millaud (1928–2016), French Polynesian politician
- Daniel Miller, multiple people
- Daniel Millican (born 1965), American writer
- Daniel Mills, multiple people
- Daniel S. Milo (born 1953), Israeli-French philosopher and writer
- Daniel Milstein (born 1975), American entrepreneur
- Daniel Mina (born 1980), Ecuadorian footballer
- Daniel Minahan, American film director
- Daniel F. Minahan (1877–1947), American politician
- Daniel Minea (born 1961), Romanian footballer
- Daniel D. Minier, American major general
- Daniel Minorelli (born 1984), Brazilian footballer
- Daniel Minter, American painter
- Daniel Mio (1941–2021), French politician
- Daniel P. Miranker, American academic
- Daniel Owino Misiani (1940–2006), Tanzanian-born Kenyan musician
- Daniel Missaki (born 1996), Brazilian baseball player
- Daniel Mitchell, multiple people
- Daniel Mitov (born 1977), Bulgarian politician
- Daniel Mitterdorfer (born 1989), Austrian ice hockey player
- Daniel Mitwali (born 1992), Australian soccer player
- Daniel Mkandawire (born 1951), Malawian athlete
- Daniel Mladenov (born 1987), Bulgarian footballer
- Daniel Mminele, South African bank executive
- Daniel Mobaeck (born 1980), Swedish footballer
- Daniel Model, Swiss male curler and businessperson
- Daniel Moder (born 1969), American cinematographer
- Daniel Moe (1926–2012), American choral conductor
- Daniel Moerman (1941–2026), American medical anthropologist
- Daniel Mögling, multiple people
- Daniel Mogoșanu (born 1967), Romanian footballer and
- Daniel Mohr, multiple people
- Daniel arap Moi (1924–2020), 2nd President of Kenya
- Daniel Mojon (born 1963), Swiss ophthalmologist
- Daniel Mojsov (born 1987), Macedonian footballer
- Daniel Gotthilf Moldenhawer (1753–1823), Danish academic
- Daniel Molina (born 1974), Spanish Paralympic triathlete
- Daniel J. Mollway, American lawyer
- Daniel Moloney (1909–1963), Irish politician
- Daniel Monardes (born 2000), Chilean footballer
- Daniel Moncharé (born 1982), Cameroonian footballer
- Daniel E. Moncho, Spanish film producers
- Daniel Mongiardo (born 1960), American physician and politician
- Daniel Mongrain (born 1976), Canadian musician
- Daniel Monks, Australian actor and screenwriter
- Daniel Monllor (born 1984), Argentine footballer
- Daniel Morris Monroe (born 1964), American artist
- Daniel Montague (1867–1912), United States Navy sailor and recipient
- Daniel Montague (surveyor) (1798–1876), American land surveyor, politician and soldier
- Daniel R. Montello, American geographer and professor
- Daniel Montenegro (born 1979), Argentine footballer
- Daniel Montes de Oca (tennis) (born 1962), Uruguayan tennis player
- Daniel Montgomery Jr. (1765–1831), American politician
- Daniel Pon Mony (1921–?), Indian weightlifter
- Daniel Monzón, Spanish screenwriter and director
- Daniel Moody, American opera singer
- Daniel Mookhey, Australian politician
- Daniel Moore, multiple people
- Daniel Mora (born 1945), Peruvian military officer and politician
- Daniel Morad (born 1990), Canadian racing driver
- Daniel Morais (born 1986), Brazilian footballer
- Daniel Morales, multiple people
- Daniel Morar (born 1966), Romanian jurist
- Daniel Moratelli (born 1961), French curler
- Daniel Morath (born 1980), New Zealand-born Tongan rugby union player
- Daniel Morcombe (1989–2003), Australian formerly missing person and murder victim
- Daniel Morden, Welsh writer and storyteller
- Daniel Walter Morehouse (1876–1941), American astronomer
- Daniel Moreira (born 1977), French footballer
- Daniel Morelon (born 1944), French cyclist
- Daniel Moreno (born 1981), Spanish road bicycle racer
- Daniel Moreno (Colombian footballer) (born 1995)
- Daniel Morgan, several people
- Daniel Georg Morhof (1639–1691), German writer and scholar
- Daniel Morillo (born 1988), Spanish archer
- Daniel Morkeberg (1870–1963), Canadian politician
- Daniel Moro (born 1973), Spanish water polo player
- Daniel Moroder (born 2002), Italian ski jumper
- Daniel Morón (born 1959), Argentine-born Chilean footballer
- Daniel J. Morrell (1821–1885), American politician
- Daniel Morris, multiple people
- Daniel Morrison, multiple people
- Daniel Morrissey (1895–1981), Irish politician
- Daniel Morse, American Anglican bishop
- Daniel Mortensen (born 1994), Danish basketball player
- Daniel Mortimer (born 1989), Australian rugby league player
- Daniel O. Morton (1815–1859), American politician
- Daniel Morys (born 2000), Polish footballer
- Daniel Moscopolites, American scholar
- Daniel David Moses (1952–2020), Canadian writer
- Daniel Moskos (born 1986), American baseball player
- Daniel Mosley, 4th Baron Ravensdale (born 1982), British engineer
- Daniel Mosquera (born 1999), Colombian footballer
- Daniel Moss, multiple people
- Daniel Mossberg (born 1981), Swedish bandy player
- Daniel da Mota (born 1985), Luxembourgish footballer
- Daniel Motlop (born 1982), Australian rules footballer
- Daniel Moulinet (born 1957), French priest and historian
- Daniel Movahedi (born 1985), English mixed martial arts referee
- Daniel Mowat (1848–1923), Canadian politician
- Daniel Mowry Jr. (1729–1806), American politician
- Daniel Moylan, Baron Moylan (born 1956), British politician
- Daniel Patrick Moynihan (1927–2004), American politician
- Daniel Mracka (born 1984), Slovak ice hockey player
- Daniel Mrázek (born 2003), Czech ice dancer
- Daniel Mróz (1917–1993), Polish stage designer and artist
- Daniel Msendami (born 2000), Tanzanian footballer
- Daniel Mudau (born 1968), South African soccer player
- Daniel Mudd, American businessman
- Daniel Henry Mueggenborg (born 1962), American Catholic bishop
- Daniel Muir (born 1983), American football player
- Daniel Muir (footballer), Scottish football player
- Daniel Mújica (born 1946), Mexican sailor
- Daniel Mukete (born 1997), Belarusian judoka
- Daniel Mukoko Samba (born 1959), Democratic Republic of the Congo
- Daniel Mulcahy (1857–1932), Australian politician
- Daniel Mulhall (born 1955), Irish diplomat
- Daniel Mulino (born 1969), Australian politician
- Daniel Mullen, multiple people
- Daniel Müller (born 1965), Swiss curler
- Daniel Müller-Schott (born 1976), German cellist
- Daniel Jobst Müller (born 1965), German biophysicist
- Daniel Mullings (born 1991), Canadian basketball player
- Daniel Mullins (1929–2019), Roman Catholic prelate
- Daniel Mulloy, British artist and filmmaker
- Daniel Mulumba (1962–2012), Ugandan swimmer
- Daniel Mulville, American engineer
- Daniel Munday (born 1985), Australian basketball player
- Daniel Munduruku (born 1964), Brazilian writer and educator
- Daniel Louis Mundy (1826–1881), New Zealand photographer
- Daniel Munguti (born 1995), Kenyan athlete
- Daniel Munie (born 2000), American soccer player
- Daniel Muñiz (born 1947), Mexican racing driver
- Daniel Munkombwe, Zambian politician
- Daniel Muñoz, multiple people
- Daniel Münschke, German politician
- Daniel Munteanu (born 1978), Romanian footballer
- Daniel Munyer (born 1992), American football player
- Daniel Muoki, Kenyan politician
- Daniel Murcutt (1817–1853), English cricketer and politician
- Daniel Muriel (born 1977), Spanish actor
- Daniel Murphy, multiple people
- Daniel Murray, several people
- Daniel Musher, American scientist
- Daniel Mushitu (born 2000), Swedish footballer
- Daniel Musiol (born 1983), German bicycle racer
- Daniel Musser, American Mennonite minister
- Daniel Mustafá (born 1984), Palestinian footballer
- Daniel Mustard (born 1975), American singer-songwriter
- Daniel Musyoka Mutinda, Kenyan politician
- Daniel Mutu (born 1987), Romanian footballer
- Daniel Muzito Bagenda (born 1996), Swedish ice hockey player
- Daniel Muzyka, Canadian academic
- Daniel Mwangi (born 1965), Kenyan boxer
- Daniel Muchunu Mwangi, Kenyan long-distance runner
- Daniel J. Myers (born 1966), American university president
- Daniel Myrick (born 1963), American film director
- Daniel Myśliwiec (born 1985), Polish football manager

== N ==
- Daniel Naatehn (1956–2023), Liberian politician
- Daniel Naborowski, Polish poet
- Daniel Nacevski (born 1995), Macedonian basketball player
- Daniel Nachev (born 2003), Bulgarian footballer
- Daniel Načinović (born 1952), Croatian poet and journalist
- Daniel Nadeau (born 1954), Canadian sports shooter
- Daniel Nadler, Canadian-born technology entrepreneur, poet and film producer
- Daniel Nagin (born 1948), American criminologist and statistician
- Daniel L. Nagin (born 1970), American law professor
- Daniel Nagrin (1917–2008), American dancer
- Dániel Nagy, multiple people
- Daniel K. Nakano (born 1964), American mathematician
- Daniel Namir (born 1997), Israeli swimmer
- Daniel Nannskog (born 1974), Swedish footballer
- Daniel Narcisse (born 1979), French handball player
- Daniel Nardicio (born 1966), American radio personality
- Daniel Nardiello (born 1982), Welsh footballer
- Daniel Nare, Motswana football manager
- Daniel Naroditsky (1995–2025), American chess player
- Daniel Nash, American episcopal priest and missionary
- Daniel Natea (born 1992), Romanian judoka
- Daniel Nathan, multiple people
- Daniel Nathaniel (born 1992), Nigerian volleyball player
- Daniel Nathans (1928–1999), American microbiologist
- Daniel Naud (born 1962), Canadian ice hockey player
- Daniel Naumov (born 1998), Bulgarian footballer
- Daniel Albert Naurits (born 1998), Estonian figure skater
- Daniel Nava (born 1983), American baseball player
- Daniel Navarrete, multiple people
- Daniel Navarro (born 1983), Spanish road bicycle racer
- Daniel Nayeri, Iranian-American author
- Daniel Erik Næzén (1752–1808), Swedish provincial physician, engraver, composer and natural scientist
- Daniel Ncayiyana, South African obstetrician
- Daniel Ndambuki (born 1977), Kenyan comedian
- Daniel Ndukwe, American football player
- Daniel Neaga (born 1965), Romanian rugby union footballer and coach
- Daniel Neal (1678–1743), English historian
- Daniel Near (1825–1890), Canadian politician
- Daniel Nearing (born 1961), American filmmaker
- Daniel W. Nebert, American biomedical scientist
- Daniel Neculmán (born 1995), Argentine footballer
- Daniel Needham (1891–1971), United States Army general
- Daniel Needham Jr. (1922–1992), American lawyer
- Daniel Negers, French professor
- Daniel Negreanu (born 1974), Romanian-Canadian professional poker player
- Daniel Neil, multiple people
- Daniel Nelson, multiple people
- Daniel Nemani (born 1981), Niuean weightlifter
- Dániel Németh, multiple people
- Daniel Neofetou (born 1989), British writer
- Daniel Nepomuceno Navarro (born 1991), American soccer player
- Daniel Neri (born 1979), Portuguese football manager
- Daniel Nermark (born 1977), Swedish speedway rider
- Daniel Nešpor (born 1987), Czech footballer
- Daniel Nester (born 1968), American writer, editor and poet
- Daniel Nestor (born 1972), Canadian tennis player
- Daniel Nettelbladt (1719–1791), German jurist and philosopher
- Daniel Nettle, British researcher
- Daniel M. Neuman (born 1944), American music educator
- Daniel Neumann (born 1989), Slovak ice hockey player
- Daniel Neumark (born 1955), American chemist
- Daniel Neuner (born 1987), German curler
- Daniel S. Nevins (born 1966), American rabbi
- Daniel New (born 1989), American ice hockey player
- Daniel Newcomb (1747–1818), justice of the New Hampshire Supreme Court
- Daniel Newcombe (fl. 1720s–1730s), Anglican dean
- Daniel Newell (born 1975), English musician
- Daniel Newman, multiple people
- Daniel Newnan (1780–1851), American politician
- Daniel Newton, multiple people
- Daniel Nexon (born 1973), American political scientist
- Daniel Neylan, Irish Anglican bishop
- Daniel Neyland, 17th-century Irish Anglican priest
- Daniel Ngamije, Rwandan minister
- Daniel Nghipandulwa (born 1985), Namibian middle-distance runner
- Daniel Ngoru, Kenyan Anglican bishop
- Daniel Nicholls (born 1987), Australian rules footballer
- Daniel Nicholson (born 1990), Australian rules footballer
- Daniel Nicklasson (born 1981), Swedish footballer
- Daniel Lee Nickrent (born 1956), American botanist
- Daniel Nicoletta, Italian-American photographer
- Daniel Nicols, French-born restaurateur
- Daniel Niculae (born 1982), Romanian footballer
- Daniel Niedzkowski (born 1976), German football coach
- Daniel Nielsen (born 1980), Danish ice hockey player
- Daniel Nielsen (footballer) (born 1995), Danish footballer
- Daniel Nielson (born 1996), Australian rules footballer
- Daniel Nigro (born 1948), Commissioner of New York City Fire Department
- Daniel Nikolac (1961–2020), Venezuelan footballer
- Daniel Nikolov (born 1998), Bulgarian badminton player
- Daniel Nikolov (footballer) (born 2005), Bulgarian footballer
- D. T. Niles (1908–1970), Sri Lankan pastor and theologian
- Daniel Nilsson (academic), Swedish fire-safety engineer
- Daniel Nilsson (born 1982), Swedish footballer
- Daniel Nimick (born 2000), Canadian soccer player
- Daniel Ninivaggi (born 1964), American automobile executive
- Daniel Nion (born 1951), French equestrian
- Daniel Nipkow (born 1954), Swiss sport shooter
- Daniel Nisbet (born 1990), Australian professional golfer
- Daniel Nitt (born 1981), German recording artist
- Daniel Njenga (born 1976), Kenyan long-distance runner
- Daniel Nkata, Ugandan FIFA association football referee
- Daniel Nkrumah (born 2003), English footballer
- Daniel Nlandu Mayi (1953–2021), Congolese Roman Catholic prelate
- Daniel Noble, multiple people
- Daniel Noboa (born 1987), president of Ecuador 2023–
- Daniel Noce (1894–1976), United States Army general
- Daniel G. Nocera (born 1957), American chemist
- Daniel Nogales (born 2003), Spanish racing driver
- Daniel Nogueira (born 1958), Brazilian footballer
- Daniel Nomura, American chemical biologist
- Daniel Noonan (cricketer) (1873–1910), Australian cricketer
- Daniel Noonan (born 1979), Australian rower
- Daniel Norbe (born 1995), Swedish ice hockey player
- Daniel Norber (born 1979), American politician
- Daniel Norcross (born 1969), British cricket broadcaster
- Daniel Nordby (born 1978), American lawyer
- Daniel Nordmark (born 1988), Swedish footballer
- Daniel Norgren (born 1983), Swedish singer
- Daniel Noriega (born 1977), Venezuelan footballer
- Daniel Norling (1888–1958), Swedish gymnast and equestrian
- Daniel Norman (born 1964), Canadian slalom canoer
- Daniel Normann (born 2002), Norwegian footballer
- Daniel Norouzi (born 1992), Danish footballer
- Daniel Norris, multiple people
- Daniel Norrmén (born 1975), Swedish football player
- Daniel Norton, multiple people
- Daniël Noteboom (1910–1932), Dutch chess player
- Daniel Notter, Swiss politician
- Daniel Nour, Australian physician
- Daniel Novac (born 1987), Romanian footballer
- Daniel Novegil, Argentine business executive
- Daniel Novikov (born 1989), Estonian cyclist
- Daniel Noyes, American politician
- Daniel Nsereko (born 1941), Ugandan judge and legal scholar
- Daniel Ntongi-Nzinga, Angolan politician
- Daniel Nugent (1954–1997), American anthropologist
- Daniel Núñez (weightlifter) (born 1958), Cuban weightlifter
- Daniel Núñez (Chilean politician) (born 1971)
- Daniel Nuñez del Prado (1840–1891), Bolivian medical doctor
- Daniel Nushiro (1938–2023), Japanese clergyman
- Daniel Nussbaumer (born 1999), Austrian footballer
- Daniel Nwoke (born 1983), Nigerian footballer
- Daniel Nyblin (1856–1923), Norwegian-born photographer
- Daniel Nys, Flemish painter

== O ==
- Daniel O'Brien, several people
- Daniel O'Callaghan, Irish politician
- Daniel O'Connell, multiple people
- Daniel O'Connor, several people
- Daniel O'Daly (1595–1662), Irish Dominican priest, diplomat and historian
- Daniel O'Day, multiple people
- Daniel O'Donnell, multiple people
- Daniel O'Donoghue, multiple people
- Daniel O'Donohue, multiple people
- Daniel O'Donovan (1890–1975), Irish republican
- Daniel Joseph O'Hern (1930–2009), American judge
- Daniel O'Kearney, Irish prelate
- Daniel O'Keefe, multiple people
- Daniel O'Keeffe, multiple people
- Daniel O'Leary, multiple people
- Daniel O'Mahony, multiple people
- Daniel O'Malley, Australian science fiction writer
- Daniel O'Neill, multiple people
- Daniel O'Regan (born 1988), New Zealand rugby league footballer
- Daniel O'Reilly, multiple people
- Daniel O'Rourke, multiple people
- Daniel O'Shaughnessy (born 1994), Finnish footballer
- Daniel O'Sullivan, multiple people
- Daniel Obajtek (born 1976), Polish politician
- Daniel Obbekjær (born 2002), Danish footballer
- Daniel Oberkofler (born 1988), Austrian ice hockey player
- Daniel Obinim (born 1977), Ghanaian religious group leader
- Daniel Och (born 1961), American financier and billionaire hedge fund manager
- Daniel Ochefu (born 1993), American-born Nigerian basketball player
- Daniel Ochoa (born 1979), German baritone
- Daniel Ocone, American mathematician
- Daniel Octobre (1903–1995), French painter
- Daniel Odafin (born 1989), Nigerian footballer
- Daniel Odier (born 1945), Swiss author
- Daniel Oehry (born 1971), Liechtenstein politician
- Daniel Oerther (born 1972), American academic
- Daniel Offenbacher (born 1992), Austrian footballer
- Daniel Offer (1929–2013), American psychiatrist
- Daniel Offredi (born 1988), Italian footballer
- Daniel Ogunmade (born 1983), Scottish-Nigerian footballer
- Daniel Ogunmodede (born 1980), Nigerian football coach
- Daniel Ohebshalom, American real estate investor
- Daniel Öhman (born 1973), Swedish investigative journalist
- Daniel Ohrn (born 1993), Swedish ice hockey player
- Daniel Ojeda (born 1986), Colombian footballer
- Daniel Ojo (born 2001), Italian footballer
- Daniel Okeke (born 2001), Irish rugby union player
- Daniel Okimoto, Japanese-American academic and political scientist
- Daniel Okoh, Nigerian pastor and administrator
- Daniel Okonkwo (born 1975), American basketball player
- Daniel Okoro (born 2003), Nigerian rugby league footballer
- Daniel Okpoko (born 2000), Nigerian-Canadian footballer
- Daniel Okrent (born 1948), American magazine editor
- Daniel Okulitch (born 1976), Canadian bass-baritone
- Daniel Okungbowa, Nigerian jurist
- Daniel Okyem Aboagye (1973–2023), Ghanaian politician
- Daniel Ola (born 1982), Ghanaian-Nigerian footballer
- Daniel Oladejo (born 1999), Canadian gridiron football player
- Daniel Olbrychski (born 1945), Polish actor
- Daniel Olcina (born 1989), Spanish footballer
- Daniel José Older, American fantasy and young adult fiction writer
- Daniel Oldrá (born 1967), Argentine footballer and coach
- Daniel Olerum (born 1983), Nigerian footballer
- Daniel Olesker (born 1952), Uruguayan economist and politician
- Daniel Olin, Finnish journalist
- Daniel Olinya, Nigerian Anglican bishop
- Daniel Olivares, multiple people
- Daniel Olivas (born 1959), American author and attorney
- Daniel de Oliveira, multiple people
- Daniel Oliveira, multiple people
- Daniel Oliver, multiple people
- Daniel Olsson (born 1975), Swedish professional golfer
- Daniel Olsson-Trkulja (born 1991), Swedish ice hockey player
- Daniel Kolawole Olukoya (born 1957), Nigerian pastor
- Daniel Omielańczuk (born 1982), Polish mixed martial arts fighter
- Daniel Omolo, Kenyan Anglican bishop
- Daniel Ona Ondo (born 1945), Gabonese politician
- Daniel Onega (born 1945), Argentine footballer
- Daniel Ong (born 1975), Singaporean businessman
- Daniel Onjeh, Nigerian politician
- Daniel Onyekachi (born 1985), Nigerian footballer
- Daniel Opande (born 1943), Kenyan general
- Daniel Opare (born 1990), Ghanaian footballer
- Daniel Opazo (born 1996), Argentine footballer
- Daniel Isiagi Opolot (born 1995), Ugandan footballer
- Daniel M. Oppenheimer, American psychologist
- Daniel Oprița (born 1981), Romanian footballer
- Daniel Orac (born 1983), Romanian footballer
- Daniel Orálek (born 1970), Czech long-distance runner
- Daniel Orelli (1653–1726), Swiss merchant and financier
- Daniel Oren (born 1955), Israeli musician
- Daniel Oreskes (born 1956), American actor
- Daniel Orlandi, American costume designer
- Daniel Örlund (born 1980), Swedish footballer
- Daniel Orme (1766–1837), English artist and publisher
- Daniel Oro (born 1963), Spanish ecologist
- Daniel Orozco (born 1957), American fiction writer
- Daniel Orozco (footballer) (born 1987), Spanish footballer
- Daniel Orr (1933–2012), American economist
- Daniel Orsanic (born 1968), Argentine tennis player
- Daniel Ortega (born 1945), Nicaraguan revolutionary and politician
- Daniel Ortiz, multiple people
- Daniel Ortmeier (born 1981), American baseball player
- Daniel Orton (born 1990), American basketball player
- Daniel Orts (1924–2013), French cyclist
- Daniel Ortúzar (c. 1850–1932), Chilean politician
- Daniel Orzechowski (born 1985), Brazilian swimmer
- Daniel Osborne, multiple people
- Daniel Osherson (1949–2022), American psychologist
- Daniel Osinachi Egwim (born 1989), Nigerian footballer
- Daniel Osorno (born 1979), Mexican footballer
- Daniel Samper Ospina (born 1974), Colombian comedian and columnist
- Daniel Oss (born 1987), Italian racing cyclist
- Daniel Ost (born 1955), Belgian florist
- Daniel Oster (1938–1999), French writer
- Daniel Ott (born 1960), Swiss composer and musicologist
- Daniel Ottensamer (born 1986), Austrian clarinetist
- Daniel Otto, American painter
- Daniel Oturu (born 1999), American basketball player
- Daniel Ouezzin Coulibaly (1909–1958), Burkinabè politician
- Daniel Outelet (1936–1970), Belgian judoka
- Daniel Overmyer, multiple people
- Daniel Owassa (born 1959), Congolese diplomat
- Daniel Owen, multiple people
- Daniel W. Owens, American playwright
- Daniel Owiredu, Ghanaian business executive
- Daniel Owsen (born 1966), American video game translator
- Daniel Owusu (born 1989), Ghanaian footballer
- Daniel Owusu (footballer, born 2003)
- Daniel Oyegoke (born 2003), English footballer
- Daniel Ozer, psychologist
- Daniel Ozmo (1912–1942), Bosnian painter

== P ==
- Daniel Pabst (1826–1910), American furniture designer
- Daniel Pacheco (born 1991), Spanish footballer
- Daniel H. Paddock (1852–1905), American politician
- Daniel Padilla (born 1995), Filipino actor and recording artist
- Daniel Pae (born 1995), American politician
- Daniel Pagano, American mobster
- Daniel Page (1790–1869), American politician
- Daniel Paille (born 1984), Canadian ice hockey player
- Daniel Paillé (born 1950), Canadian politician
- Daniel Paiola (born 1989), Brazilian badminton player
- Daniel Paisner (born 1959), American journalist and author
- Daniel Paladini (born 1984), American soccer player
- Daniel Palencia (born 2000), Venezuelan baseball player
- Daniel S. Paletko (1950–2020), American politician
- Daniel Palka (born 1991), American baseball player
- Daniel Palladino (born 1960), American television producer
- Daniel Palmer, multiple people
- Daniel Pancu (born 1977), Romanian footballer
- Daniel Pandèle (born 1961), French cyclist
- Daniel Panetta (born 1992), Canadian singer
- Daniel Panizzolo (born 1986), Swiss footballer
- Daniel Panov (born 1967), Bulgarian politician
- Daniel Pantoja (1907–2001), Chilean police officer, public servant and politician
- Daniel Papebroch (1628–1714), Flemish Jesuit hagiographer
- Daniel Pappoe (born 1993), Ghanaian footballer
- Daniel Parantac (born 1990), Filipino wushu practitioner
- Daniel Paraschiv (born 1999), Romanian footballer
- Daniel Parcon (born 1962), Filipino prelate
- Daniel Paris (born 1988), Swedish blogger and lecturer
- Daniel Parke Custis (1711–1757), American planter and politician
- Daniel Parke (1664–1710), British military officer and politician
- Daniel Parker, multiple people
- Daniel Morgan Parkinson (1790–1868), American politician
- Daniel Parra (born 1999), Mexican footballer
- Daniel Parslow (born 1985), English footballer
- Daniel Parsons, geologist
- Daniel Pascoe (1900–1971), Welsh rugby union and rugby league footballer
- Daniel Passarella (born 1953), Argentine football manager and player
- Daniel Passent (1938–2022), Polish journalist and writer
- Daniel Passino (born 1995), American singer-songwriter
- Daniel Passira (born 1996), Brazilian footballer
- Daniel Pastorelli, Australian politician
- Daniel Paterson, Canadian politician
- Daniel Paton (1871–1957), Scottish footballer
- Daniel Patte (1939–2024), French-American biblical scholar
- Daniel Patterson, multiple people
- Daniel Paul (1943–2023), French politician
- Daniel N. Paul (1938–2023), Canadian Miꞌkmaw historian
- Daniel de Pauli (born 1999), Brazilian footballer
- Daniel Paulista (born 1982), Brazilian footballer and manager
- Daniel Pauly (born 1946), French-born marine biologist
- Daniel Pavlev (born 2000), Slovenian footballer
- Daniel Pavlov (born 1967), Bulgarian archer
- Daniel Pavlović (born 1988), Bosnian footballer
- Daniel Pavón (born 1972), Spanish diver
- Daniel Pavúk (born 1998), Slovak footballer
- Daniel Pawłowiec (born 1978), Polish politician and journalist
- Daniel Pawłowski, 17th-century Polish Jesuit theological writer
- Daniel Paye (born 2000), Liberian footballer
- Daniel Payne (1811–1893), American bishop and educator
- Daniel Payne (cricketer) (born 1978), Australian cricketer
- Daniel Peacock, multiple people
- Daniel Pearce, multiple people
- Daniel Pearl, multiple people
- Daniel Pearson, multiple people
- Daniel Kimball Pearsons (1820–1912), American biblical scholar
- Daniel Peaslee (1773–1827), American politician
- Daniel Pecsi, Hungarian table tennis player
- Daniel Peddle (born 1970), American film director
- Daniel A. Pedersen (born 1992), Danish footballer
- Daniel Pedoe (1910–1998), English-born mathematician
- Daniel Pedrozo (born 2004), Colombian footballer
- Daniel Peev (born 1984), Bulgarian footballer
- Daniel Pehlivanov (born 1994), Bulgarian footballer
- Daniel Peinado (born 1967), Argentine footballer
- Daniel Peixoto (born 1986), Brazilian singer
- Daniel Peixoto (footballer) (born 1997), Brazilian footballer
- Daniel Pek (born 1991), Polish Paralympic athlete
- Daniel Peláez (born 1985), Peruvian footballer
- Daniel Pellerin (born 1941), French rugby league player
- Daniel Pelletti (1948–2026), Belgian painter
- Daniel Peluffo-Wiese (born 2003), Uruguayan-American footballer
- Daniel Pemberton (born 1977), English composer and songwriter
- Daniel Peña, multiple people
- Daniel Peñaloza (born 2002), Colombian footballer
- Daniel Pender (1832–1891), Royal Navy staff commander
- Daniel Pendín (born 1974), Argentine footballer
- Daniel Penese (born 1989), New Zealand rugby league footballer
- Daniel Penfield, American businessman
- Daniel Penha (born 1998), Brazilian footballer
- Daniel Pennac (born 1944), French writer
- Daniel Peploe Peploe (1829–1887), British politician
- Daniel Pepper (born 1989), English Paralympic swimmer
- Daniel Peralta (born 1955), Argentine politician
- Daniel Percheron (born 1942), French politician
- Daniel Percival (1979–2024), English actor
- Daniel Percival (director), British director and screenwriter
- Daniel Peredo (1969–2018), Peruvian sports journalist
- Daniel Pereira, multiple people
- Daniel Peretz (born 2000), Israeli football player
- Daniel Pérez, multiple people
- Daniel Périgaud (born 1943), French footballer
- Daniel Perlsweig (1926–2018), American jockey and horse trainer
- Daniel Perreault (born 1961), Canadian fencer
- Daniel Pérsico (born 1961), Argentine politician
- Daniel Persson (born 1982), Swedish politician
- Daniel Pesina (born 1959) American martial arts actor
- Daniel Pesut, American educator and researcher
- Daniel Peter (1836–1919), Swiss businessman
- Daniel Peterman, American painter
- Daniel Petermann (born 1995), Canadian gridiron football player
- Daniel Peters (born 1981), German politician
- Daniel Petersen, multiple people
- Daniel Peterson, multiple people
- Daniel Petit (born 1948), Canadian politician
- Daniel Petkovski (born 1993), Australian soccer player
- Daniel Petric (born 1991), American murderer
- Daniel Petrie (1920–2004), Canadian film, television and stage director
- Daniel Petrie Jr. (born 1951), American film director
- Daniel M. Petrocelli (born 1953), American lawyer
- Daniel Petroesc (born 1975), Romanian footballer
- Daniel Petrov (cyclist) (born 1982), Bulgarian cyclist
- Daniel Petrov (born 1971), Bulgarian boxer
- Daniel Kalles Pettersson, Swedish football manager
- Daniel Pettersson (handballer) (born 1992), Swedish handball player
- Daniel Pettersson (born 1969), Swedish ice hockey player
- Daniel Pettit (1915–2010), English footballer and industrialist
- Daniel Pézeril (1911–1998), French priest
- Daniel Pfeffer (born 1990), Czech volleyball player
- Daniel Pfeiffer (born 1975), American political advisor
- Daniel Pfister (born 1986), Austrian luger
- Daniel Philimon (born 1995), Vanuatuan sprinter
- Daniel Philippidis, Greek scholar
- Daniel Phillips, multiple people
- Daniel Pick, British history professor and psychoanalyst
- Daniel Picouly (born 1948), French writer
- Daniel Pierce (born 2006), American baseball player
- Daniel M. Pierce (1928–2020), American lawyer
- Daniel Pierre (1891–1979), French athlete
- Daniel Pietta (born 1986), German ice hockey player
- Daniel Pighín (born 1962), Argentine footballer
- Daniel Pik (born 2000), Polish footballer
- Daniel Piksiades (1931–2024), Yugoslav and Serbian poet
- Daniel Edward Pilarczyk (1934–2020), American Roman Catholic prelate
- Daniel Franklin Pilario, Filipino contextual theologian, writer, educator and Vincentian Catholic priest
- Daniel Pilon (1940–2018), Canadian actor
- Daniel Piña (born 2001), Chilean footballer
- Daniel Pinard (1942–2024), Canadian radio and television personality
- Daniel Pinchbeck (born 1966), American author and journalist
- Daniel Pineda, multiple people
- Daniel Pinero (born 1994), Canadian baseball player
- Daniel Pinillos (born 1992), Spanish footballer
- Daniel H. Pink (born 1964), American non-fiction writer
- Daniel Pinkham (1923–2006), American composer
- Daniel Pinkwater (born 1941), American children’s author
- Daniel H. Pinney (1837–1921), American judge
- Daniel Pinto, multiple people
- Daniel Piorkowski (born 1984), Australian soccer player
- Daniel Pipes (born 1949), American Middle East commentator
- Daniel Piscopo (1920–2009), Maltese politician
- Daniel Pitbull (born 1979), Brazilian footballer
- Daniel Pitt (born 2006), Welsh boxer
- Daniel Samper Pizano (born 1945), Colombian lawyer, journalist and prolific writer
- Daniel Plai (born 1994), Romanian rugby union player
- Daniel Toscan du Plantier (1941–2003), French film producer
- Daniel Platzman (born 1986), American drummer and singer
- Daniel Plaza (born 1966), Spanish race walker
- Daniel du Plessis (born 1995), South African para-athlete
- Daniel Pliński (born 1978), Polish volleyball player
- Daniel L. Plumer (1837–1920), American politician
- Daniel Plummer (born 1957), Belgian cyclist
- Daniel Podence (born 1995), Portuguese professional footballer
- Daniel K. Podolsky (born 1953), American gastroenterologist
- Daniel Podrzycki (1963–2005), Polish socialist politician
- Daniel Polani, American artificial intelligence
- Daniel Poleshchuk (born 1996), Israeli squash player
- Daniel Poling (born 1954), American politician
- Daniel A. Poling (1884–1968), American brethren clergyman
- Daniel Poliquin, Canadian novelist and translator
- Daniel Poliziani (1935–2019), Canadian ice hockey player
- Daniel Poliziani (born 1959), Canadian ice hockey player
- Daniel Polk (born 1985), American football player
- Daniel Pollack (born 1935), American pianist
- Daniel Pollen (1813–1896), New Zealand politician
- Daniel Pollock (1968–1992), Australian actor
- Daniel D. Polsby, American lawyer
- Daniel Polsley (1803–1877), American politician
- Daniel Polson (born 1974), Australian Paralympic cyclist
- Daniel Polz (1957–2025), German Egyptologist
- Daniel Pomarède (born 1971), French astrophysicist
- Daniel Ponce (1953–2013), American jazz musician
- Daniel Ponce de Leon (born 1992), American baseball player
- Daniel Ponce de León(born 1980), Mexican boxer
- Daniel Poneman (born 1956), American lawyer and businessman
- Daniel Pontet (1957–2022), Uruguayan-born artist
- Daniel Poohl (born 1981), Swedish writer
- Daniel Pool, Scottish bowls player
- Daniel Popa (born 1995), Romanian footballer
- Daniel Pope (born 1975), American football player
- Daniel Popescu, multiple people
- Daniel Popovic, multiple people
- Daniel Popovici-Muller, American politician
- Daniel M. Popper (1913–1999), American astrophysicist
- Daniel Porozo (born 1997), Ecuadorian footballer
- Daniel Porter, multiple people
- Daniel R. Porterfield (born 1961), American nonprofit executive
- Daniel Portman (born 1992), Scottish actor
- Daniel Portugués (born 1950), Argentine field hockey player
- Dániel Póser (born 1990), Hungarian footballer
- Daniel Q. Posin (1909–2003), American nuclear physicist and science educator
- Daniel Posner, American political scientist
- Daniel Post, American engineering scientist
- Daniel Postaer (born 1978), American photographer
- Daniel Postgate (1964–2025), English scriptwriter, author and illustrator
- Daniel Potts, multiple people
- Daniel Poudrier (born 1964), Canadian ice hockey player
- Daniel Poulou (born 1943), French politician
- Daniel Poulsen, Danish curler
- Daniel Povey, British speech recognition researcher
- Daniel Powell (born 1991), British footballer
- Daniel Powell (judoka, born 1991) (born 1991), British para judoka
- Daniel Powell (judoka, born 1997) (born 1997), British judoka
- Daniel Powter (born 1971), Canadian singer
- Daniel Pratt, multiple people
- Daniel Preissler (1627–1665), German painter
- Daniel Prenn (1904–1991), Russian-born German, Polish, and British tennis player
- Daniel Preradovic (born 1992), Swiss footballer
- Daniel Přerovský (born 1992), Czech footballer
- Daniel Presto (born 1963), Filipino Roman Catholic bishop
- Daniel Preston, multiple people
- Daniel Preussner (born 1986), German rugby union player
- Daniel Prévost (born 1939), French actor, comedian and writer
- Daniel Přibyl (born 1992), Czech professional ice hockey player
- Daniel B. Priest (1830–1870), American politician
- Daniel Prieto (born 1995), Peruvian footballer
- Daniel de Priézac, 17th-century French writer and jurist
- Daniel Pritzker, American film director
- Daniel Procházka (born 1995), Czech footballer
- Daniel Prodan (1972–2016), Romanian footballer
- Dániel Prosser (born 1994), Hungarian footballer
- Daniel Protheroe (1866–1934), Welsh composer and conductor
- Daniel John Proudfoot (1897–1972), Canadian politician
- Daniel Provencio (born 1987), Spanish footballer
- Daniel Woodley Prowse (1834–1914), Canadian lawyer, politician, judge, historian, essayist and office holder
- Daniel Pruce (born 1966), British public servant
- Daniel Prytz (born 1975), Swedish male curler
- Daniel Przybysz (born 1988), Brazilian radiation oncologist
- Daniel Puce (born 1970), Italian footballer
- Daniel Puckel (1932–2018), American sports shooter
- Daniel Puder (born 1981), American professional wrestler
- Daniel Pudil (born 1985), Czech footballer
- Daniel Puente Encina, Chilean singer-songwriter, guitarist and film composer
- Daniel Puertas Gallardo (born 1992), Spanish kickboxer
- Daniel Pulcifer (1834–1896), American politician
- Daniel Pullen (1885–1923), American football player and army officer
- Daniel Pulteney (1682–1731), English government official
- Daniel Pulteney (MP from Bramber) (1749–1811), British politician and academic
- Daniel Purcell (1664–1717), English composer
- Daniel Gugel Purse Sr. (1839–1908), American businessman
- Daniel Purvis (born 1990), British gymnast
- D. Putnam Brinley (1879–1963), American painter
- Daniel Pyne (born 1955), American writer and producer
- Daniel Pytel (born 1987), Polish speedway rider

== Q ==
- Daniel Qampicha, Kenyan Anglican bishop
- Daniel Qavvik, Canadian politician
- Daniel G. Quackenboss (1812–1853), American politician
- Daniel Quaiser (born 1975), Swiss designer, musician and singer
- Daniel Quate (born 1980), Japanese rugby union player
- Daniël van den Queborn, Dutch painter
- Daniel Queipo (born 2002), Spanish footballer
- Daniel Quesada (born 1995), Spanish taekwondo athlete
- Daniel Quigley, multiple people
- Daniel Quillen (1940–2011), American mathematician
- Daniel Quinn, several people
- Daniel Quinn-Toye, Scottish actor
- Daniel Quintero, several people
- Daniel Quinteros (born 1976), Argentine footballer
- Daniel Quirk (1982–2005), American professional wrestler
- Daniel Oduber Quirós (1921–1991), Costa Rican politician, lawyer, philosopher, poet and essayist
- Daniel Quizon (born 2004), Filipino chess grandmaster

== R ==
- Daniel Raap (1703–1754), Dutch porcelain merchant
- Dániel Rába (born 1998), Hungarian athlete
- Daniel Rabel (1578–1637), French painter
- Daniel Rabinovich (1943–2015), Argentinian actor and musician
- Daniel Račić (born 1997), Serbian footballer
- Daniel Radack, electrical engineer
- Daniel Radcliffe (born 1989), English actor
- Daniel Rader, American geneticist
- Daniel Radosh (born 1969), American journalist and blogger
- Daniel Radu, multiple people
- Daniel Rafael (born 1961), Canadian curler
- Daniel Ragsdale, American government official
- Daniel Rahimi (born 1987), Swedish ice hockey player
- Daniel Raischl (born 1997), German footballer
- Daniel Rajakoba (1940–2024), Malagasy politician
- Daniel Rajna, South African ballet dancer
- Daniel Rákos (born 1987), Czech professional ice hockey player
- Daniel Rakowitz, American murderer and cannibal
- Daniel Rambaut (1865–1937), Irish rugby union player and psychiatrist
- Daniel Ramírez (born 1992), Mexican swimmer
- Daniel Ramos, multiple people
- Daniel Ramot, Israeli-born American entrepreneur
- Daniel Ramsay (born 1984), New Zealand rugby union player
- Daniel Ramseier, Swiss equestrian
- Daniel J. Ransohoff (1921–1993), American academic
- Daniel Rantanen (born 1998), Finnish footballer
- Daniel Raoul (born 1941), French politician
- Daniel Rapant (1897–1988), Slovak archivist and historian
- Daniel Rapine (1768–1826), American politician
- Daniel Rappaport (born 1970), American producer
- Daniel Rasilla (born 1980), Spanish boxer
- Daniel Ratthé (born 1956), Canadian politician
- Daniel Rauicava (born 1986), Fijian rugby league footballer
- Daniel Ravier (born 1948), French footballer
- Daniel Ravner (born 1976), Israeli writer
- Daniel Raymer, American engineer
- Daniel Raymond, American political economist
- Daniel Razo (born 1950), Mexican footballer
- Daniel Razon (born 1967), Filipino TV and Radio broadcaster, leader of the Christian religious group Members Church of God International
- Daniel Read (1757–1836), American composer
- Daniel Read (academic) (1895–1878), American educator and president of the University of Missouri
- Daniel Rébillard (born 1948), French cyclist
- Daniel Rebolledo Sepúlveda (1848–1908), Chilean Army sergeant
- Daniel R. von Recklinghausen (1925–2011), American electrical engineer
- Daniel Lee Redman (1889–1948), Canadian politician
- Daniel Redmond (born 1991), English footballer
- Daniel Rednic (born 1978), Romanian footballer
- Daniël van der Ree (born 1972), Dutch politician
- Daniel Reed, several people
- Daniel Rees, multiple people
- Daniel Reeve, British Army general
- Daniel Reeves, multiple people
- Daniel Rehák (born 1985), Slovak footballer
- Daniel E. Reichart, American astronomer
- Daniel Reiche (born 1988), German footballer
- Daniel G. Reid (1858–1925), American industrialist, financier and philanthropist
- Daniel Reifsnyder (born 1982), American songwriter
- Daniel Czepko von Reigersfeld (1605–1660), German Lutheran poet and dramatist
- Daniel P. Reigle (1841–1917), Union Army soldier
- Daniel Reilly, multiple people
- Daniel Reimold (1981–2015), American journalist and professor
- Daniel Reiner (born 1941), French politician
- Daniel Reintzel (1755–1828), mayor of Georgetown, District of Columbia
- Daniel Reisberg, American academic
- Daniel Reiss (born 1982), German ice hockey player
- Daniel Remar, Swedish game developer
- Daniel Remeta (1958–1998), American convicted spree killer
- Daniel Renoult (1880–1958), French politician
- Daniel Rensch (born 1985), American chess player
- Daniel Restrepo (born 2000), Colombian diver
- Daniel Retamal (born 1995), Chilean footballer
- Daniel Reule (born 1983), German footballer
- Daniel Reuss (born 1961), Dutch conductor
- Daniel Revailler (born 1948), French rugby union player
- Daniel Reveles, American fiction writer
- Daniel Revelez (born 1959), Uruguayan footballer
- Daniel Revenu (1942–2024), French fencer
- Daniel Revuz, French mathematician
- Daniel Rey, American record producer
- Daniel Reyenieju (born 1966), Nigerian politician
- Daniel Reyes, multiple people
- Daniel Reynaud (born 1958), Australian historian
- Daniel Reynolds, multiple people
- Daniel Rezende (born 1975), Brazilian film editor and director
- Daniel Rhoads (1821–1895), American settler
- Daniel Rhodes (1911–1989), American sculptor and artist
- Daniel Riazat (born 1991), Swedish politician
- Daniel Ribeiro, multiple people
- Daniel Ricciardo (born 1989), Australian racing driver
- Daniel Rich (born 1990), Australian rules footballer
- Daniel Richard (1944–2023), French entrepreneur
- Daniel Richards, multiple people
- Daniel Richardson (born 2001), American football player
- Daniel Richler, Canadian arts and pop culture broadcaster and writer
- Daniel Richman, American attorney
- Daniel Richmond (1878–1948), British conservationist and Jamaican cricketer
- Daniel Richter, multiple people
- Daniel Rickardsson (born 1982), Swedish cross-country skier
- Daniel Rickenmann, American politician
- Daniel Ricquier (born 1949), French biochemist
- Daniël de Ridder (born 1984), Dutch footballer
- Daniel Rider (1938–2008), American mathematician
- Daniel Riedo (born 1942), Swiss sprinter
- Daniel Riemer (born 1986), American politician
- Daniel Rigby (born 1982), English actor and comedian
- Daniel Riihilahti (born 2006), Finnish footballer
- Daniël Rijaard (born 1976), Dutch Antilles footballer
- Daniel Riley, several people
- Daniel Rincón, multiple people
- Daniel Ringo (1803–1873), American judge
- Daniel Rinkert (born 1987), German politician
- Daniel Rinner (born 1990), Liechtenstein cyclist
- Daniel Rioli (born 1997), Australian rules footballer
- Daniel Riordan, American actor
- Daniel E. Riordan (1863–1942), American politician
- Daniel J. Riordan (1870–1923), American politician
- Daniel Riordan (rugby union) (born 1984), Irish rugby player
- Daniel Ríos, multiple people
- Daniel Ripa (born 1982), Spanish psychologist and politician
- Daniel Ripić (born 1996), Austrian footballer
- Daniel Riquelme, Chilean writer, journalist and chronicler
- Daniel Risch (born 1978), Liechtenstein politician
- Daniel Riskin, multiple people
- Daniel L. Ritchie (1931–2025), American businessman
- Daniel Ritchie (born 1987), British rower
- Daniel Rivas (born 2001), Paraguayan footballer
- Daniel Rivera (born 1952), Argentine pianist
- Daniel Rivers (born 1991), British sport shooter
- Daniel Riviere, English miniaturist
- Daniel Rivillo (born 1996), Venezuelan footballer
- Daniel Robberechts (1937–1992), Flemish writer
- Daniel Robbins, multiple people
- Daniel Roberdeau (1727–1795), American Founding Father and merchant
- Daniel Robert, multiple people
- Daniel Roberts, multiple people
- Daniel Robertson, multiple people
- Daniel Robin (1943–2018), French wrestler
- Daniel Robison, American academic administrator
- Daniel Robles (born 1947), Peruvian politician
- Daniel Roby (born 1970), Canadian film director and cinematographer
- Daniel Rocamora (born 1988), Spanish volleyball player
- Daniel Roche (historian) (1935–2023), French historian
- Daniel Roche (born 1999), English actor
- Daniel Rock (1799–1871), English Roman Catholic priest, ecclesiologist and antiquarian
- Daniel Rock (cricketer) (born 1981), English cricketer
- Daniel Rochna (born 1999), Polish cyclist
- Daniel T. Rodgers (born 1942), American historian
- Daniel Rodighiéro (born 1940), French footballer
- Daniel Rodimer (born 1978), American professional wrestler
- Daniel Rodney (1764–1846), American politician
- Daniel Rodrigues, multiple people
- Daniel Rodríguez, several people
- Daniel Roebuck (born 1963), American actor and writer
- Daniel Roekito (born 1952), Indonesian football manager
- Daniel Roemer (born 1980), American film director
- Daniel Valter Rogelim (born 1972), Brazilian cyclist
- Daniel Rogers, multiple people
- Daniel Rogoveanu (born 1995), Romanian footballer
- Daniel Roher, Canadian documentary filmmaker
- Daniel Roi (born 1987), German politician
- Daniel Rojas, multiple people
- Daniel S. Rokhsar (born 1960), American professor
- Daniel Rökman (born 2004), Finnish footballer
- Daniel Rolander (1723–1793), Swedish biologist
- Daniel G. Rollins (1842–1897), American politician
- Daniel Romanchuk (born 1998), American Paralympic athlete
- Daniel Romańczyk (born 1985), Polish sports shooter
- Daniel Romano, Canadian musician
- Daniel Romanovskij (born 1996), Lithuanian footballer
- Daniel Romanovsky (1952–2024), Israeli historian and researcher
- Daniel Romer (born 1990), American actor
- Daniel Romero (born 1985), Argentine footballer
- Daniel M. Romero, Colombian-American computer scientist
- Daniel Romualdez (1907–1965), Filipino politician
- Daniel Rona (born 2000), New Zealand rugby union player
- Daniel J. Ronan (1914–1969), American politician
- Daniel Rondeau (born 1948), French writer
- Daniel Rono (born 1978), Kenyan long-distance runner
- Daniël Roos (born 1959), French chess player
- Daniel Roos, American engineer
- Daniel Bennett St. John Roosa (1838–1908), American physician
- Daniel Rooseboom de Vries (born 1980), Dutch freestyle footballer
- Daniel C. Roper (1867–1943), American politician
- Daniel Rorke, Australian musician
- Daniel Rosa, several people
- Daniel Rosario (born 2002), Puerto Rican footballer
- Daniel Rosas (born 1989), Mexican boxer
- Daniel Rose, multiple people
- Daniel Roseberry, American fashion designer
- Daniel Roseingrave, English organist and composer
- Daniel H. Rosen, American economist
- Daniel N. Rosen (born 1965), American lawyer
- Daniel Rosenbaum (born 1997), American-Israeli basketball player in the Israel Basketball Premier League
- Daniel Rosenberg, Canadian journalist and record producer
- Daniel Rosenberger (born 1972), German rower
- Daniel Rosenbichler (born 1995), Austrian footballer
- Daniel N. Rosenblum, American diplomat
- Daniel Rosenfeld (born 1952), Israeli atmospheric scientist and academic
- Daniel Rosenthal, multiple people
- Daniel Rosero (born 1993), Colombian footballer
- Daniel Roses, American surgeon
- Daniel Rosin (born 1980), German footballer
- Daniel Rosolio (1927–2005), Israeli politician
- Daniel Ross, multiple people
- Daniel Rossel (born 1960), Belgian cyclist
- Daniel Rossello (born 1972), Uruguayan footballer
- Daniel Rossen (born 1982), American musician
- Daniel Rossi, multiple people
- Daniel Rossouw (born 1970), South African cricketer
- Daniel Rostén (born 1977), Swedish singer
- Daniel Roth, multiple people
- Daniel Rothballer (born 1994), German curler
- Daniel Rothbart, American artist
- Daniel Rothenberg, American social scientist
- Daniel Rothman, American geophysicist
- Daniel Rothschild, multiple people
- Daniel Rouan (born 1950), French astrophysicist
- Daniel Roullier (born 1935), French billionaire businessman
- Daniel Bernard Roumain, American classical composer
- Daniel Rouse (born 1972), Fijian rugby union international
- Daniel Rouzier, Haitian tycoon
- Daniel Rovero (1937–2025), American politician
- Daniel Rowbottom (born 1989), British racing driver
- Daniel Rowden (born 1997), English middle-distance runner
- Daniel Rowe, multiple people
- Daniel Rowland, multiple people
- Daniel Royer (born 1990), Austrian footballer
- Dániel Rózsa (born 1984), Hungarian footballer
- Daniel Rroshi (born 1988), Albanian footballer
- Daniel Nathan Rubin (1892–1965), American dramatist
- Daniel Rubin (born 1985), Swiss ice hockey player
- Daniel L. Rubinfeld, American economist
- Daniel Rubinstein, American diplomat
- Daniel Ruch (born 1983), American soccer player and coach
- Daniel H. Rucker (1812–1910), United States Army Quartermaster
- Daniel Ruczko (born 1982), German film director and record producer
- Daniel Rudd (1854–1933), Black Catholic journalist and activist
- Daniel Rudisha (1945–2019), Kenyan sprinter
- Daniel Rudolph (1949–2010), American mathematician
- Daniel Rudslätt (born 1974), Swedish ice hockey player
- Daniel Ruge (1917–2005), American neurosurgeon
- Daniel B. Ruggles III (1924–2022), American politician
- Daniel Ruggles (1810–1897), American confederate brigadier general
- Daniel Ruiz, several people
- Daniel Rupf, multiple people
- Daniel Rusitovic (born 1976), Australian judoka
- Daniel Russell, multiple people
- Daniel Russo (born 1948), French actor
- Daniel Edwin Rutherford (1906–1966), British mathematician
- Daniel Rutherford (1749–1819), British physician, chemist, botanist and professor
- Daniel Ruyneman (1886–1963), Dutch composer and conductor
- Daniel Bailey Ryall (1798–1864), American politician
- Daniel Ryan, multiple people
- Daniel Rydmark (born 1970), Swedish ice hockey player
- Daniel Ryfa (born 1979), Swedish pilot
- Daniel Rygel (born 1979), Czech footballer
- Daniel Rynhold (born 1971), American theologian and philosopher

== S ==
- Daniel Sabou (born 1979), Romanian footballer
- Daniel von Sachsen (born 1975), German entrepreneur and politician
- Daniel Sachs (born 1970), Swedish businessman
- Daniel Sackey (born 1994), Canadian basketball player
- Daniel Sackheim, American director
- Daniel Sada (1953–2011), Mexican novelist, poet and writer
- Daniel K. Sadler (1882–1960), American judge
- Daniel Sadzikowski (born 1994), Polish chess grandmaster
- Daniel Sáez, multiple people
- Daniel Saggiomo (born 1998), Venezuelan footballer
- Daniel Sagman (born 1979), Argentine football manager
- Daniël Sahuleka (born 1950), Dutch musician
- Daniel Saifiti (born 1996), Fijian rugby league footballer
- Daniel Sakari (born 1999), Kenyan footballer
- Daniel Sakhnenko (1875–1930), Soviet film director
- Daniel Salamanca (1869–1935), President of Bolivia
- Daniel Salamena (born 2003), Indonesian basketball player
- Daniel Salaverry (born 1972), Peruvian architect, businessman and politician
- Daniel Saldaña París, Mexican poet and novelist
- Daniel Sales (born 2006), Brazilian footballer
- Daniel Salinas (born 1962), Uruguayan neurologist and politician
- Daniel Salinas (Chilean politician) (born 1947)
- Dániel Sallói (born 1996), Hungarian footballer
- Daniel Elmer Salmon (1850–1914), American veterinarian
- Daniel Salmon (born 1994), Welsh bowls player
- Daniel Salomon, multiple people
- Daniel Salthenius (1701–1750), Swedish theologian
- Daniel Salvatierra (born 1990), Argentine footballer
- Daniel Salvi (born 1972), Swiss footballer
- Daniel Salzgeber (born 1992), Liechtenstein footballer
- Daniel Sam (born 1981), British kickboxer
- Daniel Sam (badminton) (born 1994), Ghanaian badminton player
- Daniel Samek (born 2004), Czech footballer
- Daniel Samohin (born 1998), Israeli Olympic figure skater
- Daniel Samonas (born 1990), Canadian actor
- Daniel Sams (born 1992), Australian cricketer
- Daniel Sams (American football) (born 1992), American football player
- Daniel Andreas San Diego (born 1978), American domestic terrorism suspect
- Daniel Sanabria (born 1977), Paraguayan footballer
- Daniel Alfred Sanborn (1827–1883), American surveyor
- Daniel Sancery (born 1994), Brazilian rugby union footballer
- Daniel Sánchez, multiple people
- Daniel Sande (1916–?), Argentine fencer
- Daniel Sandén-Warg, Swedish musician
- Daniel Sanders, multiple people
- Daniel Sandford, multiple people
- Daniel J. Sandin (born 1942), American artist and researcher
- Daniel Sandoval, multiple people
- Daniel Sandoz (born 1961), Swiss cross-country skier
- Daniel Sandrin, later Lee Dong-jun (born 1980), American-South Korean basketball player
- Daniel Sandu (born 2007), Romanian footballer
- Daniel H. Sandweiss, American archaeologist
- Daniel Sangouma (born 1965), French sprinter
- Daniel Sannwald, German photographer and director
- Daniel Sans (born 1975), German tenor
- Daniel Santacruz (born 1976), American singer
- Daniel Santalla, Bolivian politician
- Daniel Santamans (1959–2008), French rugby union player
- Daniel Santiago (born 1976), Puerto Rican-American basketball coach
- Daniel dos Santos, multiple people
- Daniel Santos, multiple people
- Daniel Sappa (born 1995), Argentine footballer
- Daniel Sarafian (born 1982), Armenian-Brazilian mixed martial arts fighter
- Daniel Sarcos (born 1967), Venezuelan television personality
- Daniel Sarfo, Ghanaian Anglican bishop
- Daniel Sargent, multiple people
- Daniel Šarić (born 1972), Croatian footballer
- Daniel Sarmiento Melián (born 1983), Spanish handball player
- Daniel Sarmiento (born 1971), Argentine boxer
- Daniel Sarokon (1928–2006), NASA Launch Conductor
- Daniel Saror, Nigerian politician
- Daniel Sarrabat (1666–1748), French painter
- Daniel Sasnett (born 1978), American auto racing driver
- Daniel Sasso (born 1982), Venezuelan football manager
- Daniel Satti (born 1974), Brazilian actor
- Daniel Savini (born 1997), Italian cyclist
- Daniel Savio (born 1978), Swedish electronic musician, composer and DJ
- Daniel Sawrij (born 1969), British businessman
- Daniel Sawyer (1882–1937), American golfer
- Daniel Sayre, American politician
- Daniel Sazonov (born 1993), Finnish politician
- Daniel Scally (born 1999), Scottish footballer
- Daniel T. Scannell (1912–2000), American policeman, attorney and business executive
- Daniel Schacter (born 1952), American psychologist
- Daniel Schafer, multiple people
- Daniel Schärer (born 1985), Swiss discus thrower
- Daniel Scharner (born 1997), Austrian footballer
- Daniel Schechter (born 1962), American neuroscientist
- Daniel Schechter (director), American film director, editor and screenwriter
- Daniel Scheen-Pauls (born 1992), German politician
- Daniel J. Scheeres, American aerospace engineer
- Daniel Scheil (born 1973), German Paralympic athlete
- Daniel Scheinhardt (born 1970), German footballer
- Daniel Schell (born 1980), Australian rules footballer
- Daniël Schellinks (1627–1701), Dutch painter
- Daniel Schenkel (1813–1885), Swiss Protestant theologian
- Daniel Scherning (born 1983), German footballer and manager
- Daniel Schiebeler (1741–1771), German writer
- Daniel Schildorfer (born 1982), Austrian ice hockey player
- Daniel Schlereth (born 1986), American professional baseball pitcher
- Daniel Schlumberger (1904–1972), French archaeologist
- Daniel Schmid (1941–2006), Swiss theatre and film director
- Daniel Schmid (bobsledder) (born 1976), Swiss bobsledder
- Daniel Schmidt, multiple people
- Daniel Schmutz (1943–2022), Swiss administrator and politician
- Daniel Schmutzhard, Austrian operatic baritone
- Daniel Schneemann (born 1997), American baseball player
- Daniel Schneider (born 1976), German politician
- Daniel Schneidermann (born 1958), French journalist
- Daniel Schnider (born 1973), Swiss cyclist
- Daniel Schnyder (born 1961), Swiss jazz reedist and composer
- Daniel D. Schoonover (1933–1953), United States Army medalist
- Daniel Schöpf (born 1990), Austrian footballer
- Daniel Schorn (born 1988), Austrian road racing cyclist
- Daniel Schorr (1916–2010), American journalist
- Daniel P. Schrag (born 1966), American geologist
- Daniel Gottfried Schreber (1708–1777), German cameralist, jurist and natural sciences scholar
- Daniel Paul Schreber (1842–1911), German judge
- Daniel Schreiber, multiple people
- Daniel R. Schroeder (born 1938), United States Army general
- Daniel Schroff (born 1960), Swiss sailor
- Daniel Schueftan, Israeli academic
- Daniel Schuhmacher (born 1987), German singer and songwriter
- Daniel Schulman, multiple people
- Daniel Schultz, 17th-century Polish-Lithuanian painter
- Daniel Schulz (born 1997), German footballer
- Daniel Schumacher, American painter
- Daniel Schuman, American lawyer
- Daniel Schumann (born 1977), German footballer
- Daniel Schütz (born 1991), Austrian footballer
- Daniel Schutzmann (born 1970), British actor
- Daniel Schwaab (born 1988), German footballer
- Daniel L. Schwartz, American academic and university administrator
- Daniel R. Schwartz, American-born Israeli scholar
- Daniel Schwartz, American businessman
- Daniel Schwarz (1851–1885), German trumpeter
- Daniel R. Schwarz (born 1941), American academic
- Daniel Schwenter (1585–1636), German mathematician
- Daniel J. Schwinn, American businessman
- Daniel Scînteie (born 1968), Romanian footballer
- Daniel Scioli (born 1957), Argentine politician and sportsman
- Daniel Ściślak (born 2000), Polish footballer
- Daniel R. Scoggin (born 1937), American businessman
- Daniel Scolnic, American astrophysicist and academic
- Daniel Scott, multiple people
- Daniel Scotto (1952–2018), American financial analyst
- Daniel Scuri (born 1962), Argentine rower
- Daniel Sea (born 1973), American filmmaker, actor and musician
- Daniel Seaman, Israeli media professional and civil servant
- Daniel Searle, multiple people
- Daniel Seaton, multiple people
- Daniel Seavey (born 1999), American musician
- Daniel Šebesta (born 1991), Slovak footballer
- Daniel Seddiqui, American economist
- Daniel Sedgwick (1814–1879), English hymnologist and bookseller
- Daniel Sedin (born 1980), Swedish ice hockey player
- Daniel Sedji (born 1927), Ivorian sprint canoer
- Daniel Seeger, American Quaker
- Daniel Seger (born 1977), Liechtenstein politician
- Daniel Segers (born 2001), Belgian sprinter
- Daniel Seghers (1590–1661), Flemish painter
- Daniel Seiter, Italian painter
- Daniel Sekhoto (1970–2008), South African soccer player
- Daniel Seligman (1924–2009), American journalist
- Daniel Seltzer (1933–1980), American actor and professor
- Daniel Selvaraj (1938–2019), Indian writer
- Daniel Selznick (1936–2024), American film and television producer
- Daniel Seman (born 1979), Czech ice hockey player
- Daniel Semenzato (born 1987), Italian footballer
- Daniel Sénélar (1925–2001), French painter
- Daniel Senet (born 1953), French weightlifter
- Daniel Sengewald (born 1975), German footballer
- Daniel Senn (born 1983), Swiss footballer
- Daniel Sennert (1572–1637), German physician and academic
- Daniel Post Senning, American etiquette expert
- Daniel Sepulveda (born 1984), American football player
- Daniel Șerbănică (born 1996), Romanian footballer
- Daniel Sereinig (born 1982), Swiss footballer
- Daniel Sernine (born 1955), French Canadian writer
- Daniel Serra (swimmer) (born 1968), Spanish swimmer
- Daniel Serra (born 1984), Brazilian auto racing driver
- Daniel Serrano (born 1976), Spanish politician
- Daniel Serritella, 20th-century American politician
- Daniel Servitje (born 1959), Mexican businessman
- Daniel Serwer, American diplomat and academic
- Daniel Sesma (born 1984), Spanish cyclist
- Daniel Sestrajcic (born 1976), Swedish politician
- Daniel Severino (born 1982), Australian soccer player
- Daniel Seymour, multiple people
- Daniel Sferra, American politician
- Daniel Shagoury (born 1981 or 1982), American politician
- Daniel J. Shanefield (1930–2013), American engineer
- Daniel Shank (born 1967), Canadian ice hockey player
- Daniel Shanks (1917–1996), American mathematician
- Daniel B. Shapiro (born 1969), American diplomat
- Daniel Sharfstein, legal scholar
- Daniel Sharman (born 1986), English actor
- Daniel Sharp, multiple people
- Daniel Shays (1747–1825), American soldier and rebellion
- Daniel Sheehan, multiple people
- Daniel R. Sheen (1852–1926), American politician and lawyer
- Daniel Sheffer (1783–1880), American politician
- Daniel Sheffey (1770–1830), American politician
- Daniel Shehata, Austrian film director
- Daniel Shek (born 1955), Israeli diplomat
- Daniel Sherman, multiple people
- Daniel Sherry (born 1946), Canadian swimmer
- Daniel Shersty (1977–1998), American activist
- Daniel Shewchuk, Canadian politician
- Daniel L. Shields, American diplomat
- Daniel Shiffman (born 1973), American computer programmer
- Daniel Shilkov (born 1982), Russian politician
- Daniel Shilvock (born 1983), English cricketer
- Daniel Shin (born 1985), South Korean businessman
- Daniel Shirley (born 1979), New Zealand badminton player
- Daniel Short (born 1961), American politician
- Daniel Showalter, American politician
- Daniel Shurben (born 1983), English cricketer
- Daniel Siad, Swedish modeling scout
- Daniel Sibandze (born 1964), Swazi long-distance runner
- Daniel Siboni (born 1959), French photographer
- Daniel Sickles (1819–1914), United States Army general and politician
- Daniel Sidbury (born 1994), British wheelchair racer
- Daniel Siebert, multiple people
- Daniel Siegert (born 1991), German singer
- Daniel Sieradski (born 1979), American writer and activist
- Daniel Sieveke (born 1976), German politician
- Daniel Siewiorek (born 1946), American computer engineer
- Daniel Sikorski (born 1987), Polish-born Austrian footballer
- Daniel Sikuta (born 1992), Kenyan rugby union player
- Daniel Sili (1930–2022), Brazilian water polo player
- Daniel Sillman, American executive
- Daniel Silna (born 1944), American businessman
- Daniel da Silva, multiple people
- Daniel Silva, several people
- Daniel Silvani (born 1986), Argentine professional footballer
- Daniel Silveira (born 1982), Brazilian politician
- Daniel Silver, British sculptor
- Daniel B. Silver, lawyer and General Counsel of the Central Intelligence Agency
- Daniel Silverberg, American film director
- Daniel Silverman, American linguist
- Daniel Silvestri (born 2002), American racing driver
- Daniel Simanjuntak, Indonesian diplomat
- Daniel Simberloff (born 1942), American ecologist and professor
- Daniel Simmes (born 1966), German footballer
- Daniel Simmons, multiple people
- Daniel Simon (swimmer) (born 1988), German Paralympic swimmer
- Daniel Simon, German concept designer
- Daniel Simone, American author
- Daniel Simons, American psychologist
- Daniel Simonsen, Norwegian comedian and actor
- Daniel Simpson, multiple people
- Daniel Sims, Canadian historian
- Daniel Singer, multiple people
- Daniel Singh, American politician
- Daniel Siniakov (born 2003), Czech tennis player
- Daniel Sinkinson (born 2001), New Zealand rugby union player
- Daniel Sirera (born 1967), Spanish politician
- Daniel Sitentu Mpasi (1934–2014), Namibian tribal king
- Daniel Sivan (born 1949), Israeli professor
- Daniel Sjölin (born 1977), Swedish writer and television host
- Daniel Sjölund (born 1983), Finnish footballer
- Daniel Skaaning (born 1993), Danish swimmer
- Daniel Skaarud (born 2007), Norwegian footballer
- Daniel Skalický (born 1991), Czech ice hockey player
- Daniel Skarps (born 1976), Swedish bandy player
- Daniel Skerl (born 2003), Italian cyclist
- Daniel Skiba (born 2000), Polish footballer
- Daniel Skibiński (born 1990), Polish mixed martial artist
- Daniel Skjeldam (born 1975), Norwegian business executive
- Daniel Skretteberg (born 2001), Ethiopian footballer
- Daniel Škvor (born 1989), Czech kickboxer and boxer
- Daniel Skye (born 2000), American singer-songwriter
- Daniel Šlachta (1923–2007), Slovak skier
- Daniel Slater (director) (born 1966), British theatre and opera director
- Daniel Slater (sailor) (born 1976) New Zealand Sailor
- Daniel Slatkin (born 1994), American composer, conductor, multi-instrumentalist and music producer
- Daniel Slaughter, multiple people
- Daniel Sleator (born 1953), American computer scientist
- Daniel Sliper (born 1987), Swedish footballer
- Daniel Sliwinski (born 1990), British swimmer
- Daniel Sloate (1931–2009), Canadian translator, poet and playwright
- Daniel Sloss (born 1990), Scottish comedian
- Daniel Slotnick (1931–1985), American mathematician
- Daniel Smailes (born 1976), Australian rugby league player
- Daniel Smales (born 1990), British actor
- Daniel R. Small, American artist
- Daniel Šmejkal (born 1970), Czech football player and manager
- Daniel Smékal (born 2001), Czech footballer
- Daniel Smethurst (born 1990), British tennis player
- Daniel Šmiga (born 2004), Czech footballer
- Daniel Smith, several people
- Daniel L. Smith-Christopher, American theologian
- Daniel Smuga (born 1997), Polish footballer
- Daniel Snoeks (born 1994), Australian model, television personality and tattooist
- Daniel Snowman (born 1938), British columnist
- Daniel Snyder, multiple people
- Daniel Soares (filmmaker), Portuguese filmmaker and screenwriter
- Daniel Soares (born 1992), Portuguese footballer
- Daniel Sobel, educational consultant
- Daniel Sobkova (born 1985), Austrian footballer
- Daniel Sobkowicz (born 2002), American football player
- Daniel Sobotka (born 1992), Czech ice hockey player
- Daniel Sobralense (born 1983), Brazilian footballer
- Daniel K. Sodickson, American physicist
- Daniel Sofer (born 1988), Israeli footballer
- Daniel Sokatch (born 1968), American activist
- Daniel Sokol, British barrister
- Daniel Solà (born 1976), Spanish rally driver
- Daniel Solander (1733–1782), Swedish botanist
- Daniel Solas (born 1946), French footballer
- Daniel Solis, American politician
- Daniel Solod, Soviet diplomat and orienteer
- Daniel Solomon (born 1945), Canadian abstract painter
- Daniel G. Solórzano, American educator and researcher
- Daniel J. Solove, American professor
- Daniel Solsona (born 1952), Spanish footballer
- Daniel Solway (born 1995), Australian cricketer
- Daniel Somers (1983–2013), American author of widely seen suicide note
- Daniel E. Somes (1815–1888), American politician
- Daniël van Son (born 1994), Dutch footballer
- Daniel Sondell (born 1984), Swedish ice hockey player
- Daniel Sonenberg, American classical composer
- Daniel E. Soper (1843–1923), American politician
- Daniel Sorano (1920–1962), French actor
- Daniel Soranz (born 1979), Brazilian politician
- Daniel Sorbello (born 1980), Italian rugby league footballer
- Daniel Soreau, German painter
- Daniel Sorensen (born 1990), American football player
- Daniel Castañeda Soriano, Mexican musicologist
- Daniel Sørvik (born 1990), Norwegian ice hockey player
- Dániel Sós (born 1998), Hungarian swimmer
- Daniel Sosa (born 1983), Paraguayan rower
- Daniel Sosah (born 1998), Nigerian footballer
- Daniel Sotomayor (1958–1992), American gay political cartoonist
- Daniel Sotres (born 1993), Spanish footballer
- Daniel Soubeyran (1875–1959), French rower
- Daniel Souček (born 1998), Czech footballer
- Daniel Soulage (1942–2020), French politician
- Daniel Soulez Larivière (1942–2022), French lawyer
- Daniel Sousa, multiple people
- Daniel Southern (born 1975), Australian rules footballer
- Daniel Southwell (1764–1797), Royal Navy officer
- Daniel Sowatey (born 1994), Ghanaian footballer
- Daniel Špaček (born 1986), Czech ice hockey player
- Daniel Spagnou (born 1940), French politician
- Daniel Sparks, multiple people
- Daniel B. Sparr (1931–2006), American judge
- Daniel Sparre (born 1984), Canadian-German ice hockey player
- Daniel Spassov, Bulgarian singer
- Daniel V. Speckhard (born 1959), American diplomat
- Daniel Specklin (c. 1536–1589), French architect
- Daniel Speer (1636–1707), Slovak music educator, composer, educator and writer
- Daniel Speers (born 1997), British swimmer
- Daniel Spencer, multiple people
- Daniel Spencer-Tonks (born 1995), English rugby league footballer
- Daniel Spengler (born 1966), Swiss handball player
- Daniel Sperber (born 1940), British-born Israeli rabbi and professor
- Daniel Sperling (born 1951), American academic
- Daniel Sperrle (born 1982), Swedish ice hockey player
- Daniel Spielman (born 1970), American computer scientist
- Daniel Spiers, Scottish footballer
- Daniel Spiridon (born 1984), Romanian footballer
- Daniel Spitz (born 1990), American mixed martial arts fighter
- Daniel Spoerri (1930–2024), Swiss artist and writer
- Daniel Spohn (born 1984), American mixed martial arts fighter
- Daniel Sprong (born 1997), Dutch ice hockey player
- Daniel Sproule (born 1974), Australian field hockey player
- Daniel Spry (1913–1989), Canadian Army officer
- Daniel F. Spulber (born 1953), American academic
- Daniel Squadron (born 1979), American politician
- Daniel Srb (born 1964), Croatian politician
- Daniel Stabrawa (born 1955), Polish violinist and conductor
- Daniel Stacey (1785–1863), English cricketer
- Daniel Stahl, multiple people
- Daniel Stahle (born 1974), Bolivian alpine skier
- Daniel Stålhammar (born 1974), Swedish football referee
- Daniel Stalpaert (1615–1676), Dutch architect, painter, town carpenter, print artist and draftsman
- Daniel Stamm (born 1976), German film director
- Daniel Stamp (born 1966), English cricketer
- Daniel Stampatori (born 2004), Canadian soccer player
- Daniel Stan (born 1978), Romanian footballer
- Daniel Stana (born 1982), Romanian footballer
- Daniel Stanchfield (1820–1908), American businessman, explorer and politician
- Daniel Stanese (born 1994), Canadia soccer player
- Daniel Stange (born 1985), American baseball player
- Daniel Staniszewski (born 1997), Polish cyclist
- Daniel Stankovič (born 1984), Slovenian footballer
- Daniel Starch (1883–1979), American academic
- Daniel Starr (1934–2024), American college athletics administrator
- Daniel Stashower (born 1960), American author and editor
- Daniel F. Steck (1881–1950), American politician
- Daniel Stedman, American film director
- Daniel Steedman (born 2000), Scottish footballer
- Daniel Steegmann Mangrané, Catalan visual artist
- Daniel Steele Durrie (1819–1892), American librarian
- Daniel Stefanovski (born 1996), Swiss kickboxer
- Daniel Stefański (born 1977), Polish football referee
- Daniel Štefulj (born 1999), Croatian footballer
- Daniel Steibelt (1765–1823), German pianist and composer
- Daniel Steiger (born 1966), Swiss cyclist
- Daniel Stein, multiple people
- Daniel Steiner, German actor and film director
- Daniel Steininger (born 1995), German footballer
- Daniël Stellwagen (born 1987), Dutch chess grandmaster
- Daniel Stenberg (born 1970), Swedish software developer
- Daniel Stendel (born 1974), German association football player and manager
- Daniel Stenderup (born 1989), Danish footballer
- Daniel Stensland (born 1989), Norwegian footballer
- Daniel Stensøe (born 1994), Norwegian footballer
- Daniel Stensson (born 1997), Swedish footballer
- Daniel Stephan (born 1973), German handball player
- Daniel Steres (born 1990), American professional soccer player
- Daniel Stern, multiple people
- Daniel Sternberg (1913–2000), American classical composer
- Daniel Sternefeld (1905–1986), Belgian composer and conductor
- Daniel Sterzik (born 1981), Czech politician
- Daniel Rankin Steuart (1848–1925), Scottish industrial chemist
- Daniel Steuernagel (born 1979), German football manager
- Daniel Stevens, multiple people
- Daniel Stewart, several people
- Daniel Stieglitz (born 1980), German caricature artist
- Daniel Chapman Stillson (1826–1899), American inventor
- Daniel Stingo (born 1965), Chilean politician
- Daniel B. St. John (1808–1890), American politician
- Daniel Stock (born 1992), Norwegian cross-country skier
- Daniël van der Stoep (born 1980), Dutch politician
- Daniel Stoian (born 1967), Romanian sprint canoer
- Daniel Stokholm (born 1990), Danish politician
- Daniel Stokols, American academic
- Daniel Stoljar, Australian philosopher
- Daniel Owen Stolpe (1939–2018), American artist
- Daniel Stolper (1935–2020), American musician
- Daniel Storey, British journalist and author
- Daniel Stover (1826–1864), American farmer and guerrilla
- Daniel St. Pierre (born 1961), American filmmaker
- Daniel Sträßer (born 1987), German actor
- Daniel Stratievsky, Soviet-born Israeli conductor
- Daniel Straub, American director and filmmaker
- Daniel Strauch (born 1981), German basketball player
- Daniel Straus, multiple people
- Daniel Streich, Swiss military instructor
- Daniel Streiff, Swiss curler
- Daniel Strickland (born 1979), Australian rugby league footballer
- Daniel Strickler (1897–1992), American politician
- Daniel Strickner (born 1997), Austrian footballer
- Daniel C. Striepeke (1930–2019), American makeup artist
- Daniel Strigel (born 1975), German fencer
- Daniel W. Stroock (1940–2025), American mathematician
- Daniel Strož (born 1943), Czech politician
- Daniel Stuart, Scottish journalist
- Daniel Stubbs, multiple people
- Daniel Stucki (born 1981), Swiss footballer
- Daniel Stückler (born 1997), Danish footballer
- Daniel Studley (born 1992), British long-distance runner
- Daniel Stumpf (born 1991), American baseball player
- Daniel Elliot Stuntz (1909–1983), American mycologist
- Daniel Sturgeon (1789–1878), American politician
- Daniel Sturgis, British painter
- Daniel Sturla (born 1959), Uruguayan Catholic prelate
- Daniel Sturm (born 1997), German politician
- Daniel Sturridge (born 1989), English footballer
- Daniel F. Styer, American theoretical physicist and author
- Daniel Stynes (born 1998), Australian soccer player
- Daniel Suarez, multiple people
- Daniel Subotnik, American professor of law
- Daniel Suchánek (born 1993), Czech canoeist
- Daniel Suciu (born 1980), Romanian politician
- Daniel Sueiro (1931–1986), Spanish writer
- Daniel Suero Alonso (born 1988), Spanish businessman
- Daniel Suhr (1964–2001), American firefighter
- Daniel Sui (born 1965), Chinese-American geographer
- Daniel Suidani (1970–2025), Solomon Islands politician
- Daniel Sullivan, several people
- Daniel Sully (1855–1910), American dramatist
- Daniel Isom Sultan (1885–1947), United States Army general
- Daniel Suluka-Fifita, Australian rugby league footballer
- Daniel Summerhays (born 1983), American professional golfer
- Daniel Summerhill (born 1989), American cyclist
- Daniel Sumner, multiple people
- Daniel Sundén-Cullberg (1907–1982), Swedish sailor
- Daniel Sunderland (born 1989), Canadian bobsledder
- Daniel Sundgren (born 1990), Swedish footballer
- Daniel Sunjata (born 1971), American actor
- Daniel Susac (born 2001), American baseball player
- Daniel Sutherland, multiple people
- Dániel Sváb (born 1990), Hungarian footballer
- Daniel Svärd, multiple people
- Daniel Svensson (born 1977), Swedish drummer
- Daniel Svensson (footballer, born 1983)
- Daniel Svensson (footballer, born 2002)
- Daniel Swan, multiple people
- Daniel Swanson (born 1959), American politician
- Daniel Swarovski (1862–1956), Czech-Austrian glassmaker
- D. B. Sweeney (born 1961), American actor
- Daniel L. Swenson (1928–2014), American bishop
- Daniel Swern (1916–1982), American chemist
- Daniel Sykes (1766–1832), British MP
- Daniel Sylvander (born 1992), Swedish ice hockey player
- Daniel Robbins Sylvester (1825–1909), América politician
- Daniel Aweyue Syme, Ghanaian politician
- Daniel Symmes (c. 1772–1817), American judge
- Daniel Syrkin (born 1971), Israeli film director and screenwriter
- Daniel Sysoev (1974–2009), Russian orthodox priest
- Dániel Szalai (born 1996), Hungarian footballer
- Daniel Szczepan (born 1995), Polish association football player
- Daniel Szelągowski (born 2002), Polish footballer
- Daniel Szor, American distiller
- Dániel Sztraka (born 2003), Hungarian handball player
- Daniel B. Szyld, Argentinian-American mathematician

== T ==
- Daniel Taabu (born 1996), Kenyan rugby sevens player
- Daniel Tagoe (born 1986), Kyrgyzstani footballer
- Daniel Tai (born 1977), New Zealand boxer
- Daniel Taillon (born 1952), Canadian hurdler
- Daniel Takawambait, Native American Christian pastor
- Daniel Talbot, multiple people
- Daniel Talia (born 1991), Australian rules footballer
- Daniel W. Tallmadge (1842–1894), American politician
- Daniel Tallon (1836–1908), Irish politician
- Daniel Tamburello, American politician
- Daniel Tammet (born 1979), British writer and savant
- Daniel M. Tani (born 1961), American astronaut
- Daniel Tapeta (born 1974), Tahitian footballer
- Daniel Taradash (1913–2003), American screenwriter
- Daniel Tarczal (born 1985), Czech footballer
- Daniel Tarone (born 1975), Swiss footballer
- Daniel Tarschys (born 1943), Swedish academic and politician
- Daniel Tarullo (born 1952), American law professor
- Daniel Tashian, American songwriter, producer and multi-instrumentalist
- Daniel Tata (born 1990), Indonesian footballer
- Daniel Tătar (born 1987), Romanian footballer
- Daniel Tătaru (born 1967), Romanian mathematician
- Daniel Taub, Israeli diplomat, lawyer and writer
- Daniel Tauvry (1669–1701), French physician
- Daniel Tavares, American serial killer
- Daniel Tawéma (born 1947), Beninese politician
- Daniel Taylor, several people
- Daniel Tchuř (born 1976), Czech footballer
- Daniel Teixeira (politician) (born 1995), Portuguese politician
- Daniel Teixeira (born 1968), Brazilian footballer
- Daniel Teklehaimanot (born 1988), Eritrean racing cyclist
- Daniel Tekpertey, Ghanaian politician
- Daniel Michael Tellep (1931–2020), American corporate executive
- Daniel Telser (born 1970), Liechtenstein footballer
- Daniel Templon (born 1945), French contemporary artist
- Daniel Tenenbaum (born 1995), Brazilian footballer
- Daniel Tenn (born 1981), Swedish curler
- Daniel Te'o-Nesheim (1987–2017), Samoan American footballer
- Daniel Terdiman, American journalist
- Daniel Termont (born 1953), Belgian politician
- Daniel Terni, Italian rabbi
- Daniel J. Terra (1911–1996), American scientist, businessman and art lover
- Daniel Terry, English actor and playwright
- Daniel Tesfaye, Ethiopian cyclist
- Daniel Tetour (born 1994), Czech footballer
- Daniel Tetrault (born 1979), Canadian ice hockey player
- Daniel Teymur (born 1988), Swedish kickboxer and mixed martial arts fighter
- Daniel Thalmann (born 1946), Swiss-Canadian computer scientist and pioneer
- Daniel Thatcher, American politician
- Daniel Theis (born 1992), German basketball player
- Daniel Theno (born 1947), American politician and educator
- Daniel Theorin (born 1983), Swedish footballer
- Daniel Theron (1872–1900), Boer military officer and lawyer
- Daniel Therriault (born 1953), American playwright and actor
- Daniel Therrien, Canadian lawyer and civil servant
- Daniel Theuma (born 1971), Maltese footballer
- Daniël Theys (born 1953), Belgian glassmaker
- Daniel Thiagarajah, Sri Lankan Tamil bishop
- Daniel Thiaw (1937–2018), Senegalese sprinter
- Daniel Thioune (born 1974), German football manager
- Daniel Thivart, Dutch Golden Age painter
- Daniel Thøgersen (born 2000), Danish footballer
- Daniel Thomas, multiple people
- Daniel Thompson, several people
- Daniel T. Thomsen, American television writer and producer
- Daniel Thorner, American economist
- Daniel I. J. Thornton (1911–1976), American politician
- Daniel Thrap (1832–1913), Norwegian priest, historian and author
- Daniel Thrasher (born 1993), American YouTuber and musician
- Daniel Thuayre (1924–1980), French cyclist
- Daniel Thürer (born 1945), Swiss jurist and professor
- Daniel Thurston (1719–1805), American army officer
- Daniel Thwaites (c. 1817–1888), English brewer and politician
- Daniel Tibbets, American media executive
- Daniel F. Tiemann(1805–1899), American politician
- Daniel Tijolo (1982–2019), Brazilian footballer
- Daniel Tilas (1712–1772), Swedish mineralogist
- Daniel R. Tilden (1804–1890), American politician
- Daniel Tilenus (1563–1633), German-French Protestant theologian
- Daniel Tílger (born 1970), Argentine footballer
- Daniel Tillo (born 1996), American professional baseball player
- Daniel Tilton (1763–1830), American territorial judge
- Daniel Timofte (born 1967), Romanian footballer
- Daniel Tinayre (1910–1994), Argentine filmmaker
- Daniel Ting (born 1992), Malaysian footballer
- Daniel Tinte (born 1969), Argentine pianist
- Daniel Tioumentsev (born 2002), American pair skater
- Daniel Tirona (1864–1939), Filipino politician
- Daniel Tissavak (born 1975), Chilean footballer
- Daniel Tjärnqvist (born 1976), Swedish ice hockey player
- Daniel Tjernström (born 1974), Swedish footballer
- Daniel Tji Hak-soun (1921–1993), South Korean bishop
- Daniel Tjongarero (1947–1997), Namibian politician and independent activist
- Daniel Tkaczuk (born 1979), Canadian ice hockey player
- Daniel J. Tobin (1875–1955), American labor leader
- Daniel Tobin (born 1997), American poet
- Daniel Toda (born 1982), Romanian politician
- Daniel du Toit (1917–1981), South African astronomer
- Daniel Tolar (born 1982), Australian rugby league footballer
- Daniel Toledo (born 1991), Ecuadorian bassist and composer
- Daniel Toler (1739–1796), Irish MP
- Daniel Toma (born 2000), Romanian footballer
- Daniël Tomberg, Dutch Golden Age glass painter
- Daniel A. Tompkins (1851–1914), American engineer, industrialist, and journalist
- Daniel D. Tompkins (1774–1825), 6th vice president of the United States
- Daniel van Tonder (born 1991), South African professional golfer
- Daniel Too (born 1978), Kenyan long-distance runner
- Daniel Topolski (1945–2015), British rower
- Daniel Torday, American novelist
- Daniel Tordera (born 1986), Spanish scientist and writer
- Daniel Torgersson (born 2002), Swedish ice hockey player
- Daniel Toribio (born 1988), Spanish footballer
- Daniel Torok, American photographer and filmmaker
- Daniel la Torre Regal (born 1997), Peruvian badminton player
- Daniel Torres, multiple people
- Daniel Torto, Ghanaian Anglican bishop
- Daniel Tosh (born 1975), American stand-up comedian and television presenter
- Daniel Tossanus (1541–1602), French reformed theologian
- Daniel Toth (born 1987), Austrian footballer
- Daniel Touche (born 1939), French gymnast
- Daniel Tovar (born 1989), Mexican actor
- Daniel B. Towner (1850–1919), American composer
- Dániel Tőzsér (born 1985), Hungarian footballer
- Daniel Tracey (1794–1832), Irish doctor, journalist and politician
- Daniel Trachsel, Swiss chemist
- Daniel Tracy, multiple people
- Daniel Tranel (born 1957), American neurologist
- Daniel Tranter (born 1992), Australian swimmer
- Daniel Traub, American photographer and filmmaker
- Daniel J. Travanti (born 1940), American actor
- Daniel M. Traynor, American judge
- Daniel Treadwell (1791–1872), American inventor
- Daniel M. Tredwell (1826–1921), American attorney, businessman, book collector and author
- Daniel Trefler, Canadian economist
- Daniel Treisman (born 1964), British-American political scientist
- Daniel Trenton (born 1977), Australian taekwondo practitioner
- Daniel C. Trewhitt (1823–1891), American attorney, judge and politician
- Daniel Trickett-Smith (born 1995), English footballer
- Daniel Trilling, British journalist, editor and author
- Daniel Trocmé (1912–1944), physics and biology teacher
- Daniel Trojanowski (born 1982), Polish rower
- Daniel Trotter, American furniture maker
- Daniel Ignác Trubač (born 1969), Czech sculptor and medalist
- Daniel Trubač (born 1997), Czech footballer
- Daniel Truhitte (born 1943), American actor
- Daniel Trujillo (1918–?), Venezuelan sailor
- Daniel Trust (born 1989), Rwandan businessman
- Daniel Tsai, Taiwanese billionaire businessman
- Daniel C. Tsang (born 1949), American activist and scholar
- Daniel Tschan (born 1960), Swiss weightlifter
- Daniel Tschofenig (born 2002), Austrian ski jumper
- Daniel Tse (born 1934), chair of the University Council of the University of Macau
- Daniel Tshabalala (born 1977), South African soccer player
- Daniel Tshilanda (born 2006), Congolese professional footballer
- Daniel Tsiokas (born 1971), Greek table tennis player
- Daniel C. Tsui (born 1939), Chinese-American physicist
- Daniel Tucker, multiple people
- Daniel Tudor, multiple people
- Daniel Hack Tuke (1827–1895), English doctor
- Daniel Tulley, United States Air Force general
- Daniel P. Tully (1932–2016), American business executive
- Daniel Tupou (born 1991), Australian Rugby League player
- Daniel Turcotte (born 1962), Canadian speed skater
- Daniel Turek (born 1993), Czech cyclist
- Daniel Gottlob Türk (1750–1813), German composer
- Daniel Turner, multiple people
- Daniel Turp (born 1955), Canadian politician
- Daniel S. Tuttle (1837–1923), American episcopal bishop
- Daniel Twomey (1864–1935), British administrator
- Daniel Tyerman (1773–1828), English missionary
- Daniel Tyler (1799–1882), American iron manufacturer, railroad president and Union Army general
- Daniel Tyler Jr. (1899–1967), American politician
- Daniel Tynell (born 1976), Swedish cross-country skier
- Daniel Tyrie, Canadian political activist
- Daniel Tyrkas (born 1975), German snowboarder
- Daniel Scott Tysdal (born 1978), Canadian poet and film director
- Daniel Tzvetkoff, Australian entrepreneur

== U ==
- Daniel Uberti (born 1963), Uruguayan footballer and manager
- Daniel Udoh (born 1996), Nigerian footballer
- Daniel Udree (1751–1828), American politician
- Daniel Udsen (born 1983), Danish Faroese footballer
- Daniel Ujazdowski (born 1991), German footballer
- Daniel Ullman (1810–1892), American politician and Civil War Union general
- Daniel B. Ullman (1918–1979), American dramatist
- Daniel Unal (born 1990), Swiss footballer of Assyrian origin
- Daniel Ung (born 1975), Swedish footballer
- Daniel Unger (born 1978), German triathlete
- Daniel Berkeley Updike (1860–1941), American printer and historian of typography
- Daniel Phillips Upham (1832–1882), American politician, businessman, and militia commander
- Daniel Urai, Fijian trade unionist and politician
- Daniel Irujo Urra (1864–1911), Spanish lawyer
- Daniel Urresti (born 1956), Peruvian politician and officer
- Daniel Ustian (born 1950), American business executive
- Daniel Usvat (born 1973), Romanian footballer
- Daniel Utomi (born 1997), American basketball player
- Daniel Uziel (born 1967), Israeli historian

== V ==
- Daniel Vaca (born 1978), Bolivian footballer
- Daniel Vacek (born 1971), Czech tennis player
- Daniel Vachez (1946–2021), French politician
- Dániel Vadnai (born 1988), Hungarian footballer
- Daniel Vădrariu (born 1990), Romanian footballer
- Daniel Vahnke (born 1965), Canadian musician
- Daniel Vaillant (born 1949), French politician
- Daniel Valchev (born 1962), Bulgarian politician
- Daniel Valdez (born 1949), American actor
- Daniel Valente (born 1999), Canadian football player
- Daniel Mulford Valentine (1830–1907), American judge and politician
- Daniel Valenzuela, multiple people
- Daniel J. Valianti, American politician
- Daniel Valladares, Mexican boxer
- Daniel Vallejo (born 2004), Paraguayan tennis player
- Daniel Vallejos (born 1981), Costa Rican footballer
- Daniel A. Vallero, American environmental author and scientist
- Daniel Vallverdú (born 1986), Venezuelan tennis coach and player
- Daniel Myers Van Auken (1826–1908), American politician
- Daniel Tompkins Van Buren (1826–1890), American military officer and engineer
- Daniel Van Buyten (born 1978), Belgian international footballer
- Daniel M. Van Cott (died 1903), American politician
- Daniel Jansen Van Doorn (born 1990), Canadian volleyball player
- Daniel Van Kirk, American comedian, podcast personality and writer
- Daniel C. Van Norman (1815–1886), Canadian-born American educator, clergyman and school founder
- Daniel Van Pelt (born 1964), American politician
- Daniel Van Ryckeghem (1945–2008), Belgian cyclist
- Daniel Van Voorhis (1878–1956), United States Army general
- Daniel Van de Wiele (born 1956), Belgian boxing referee
- Daniel Vançan (born 1996), Brazilian footballer
- Daniel Vancsik (born 1977), Argentine golfer and politician
- Daniel Vandermeulen, Canadian educator
- Daniel Vandervoort (born 1994), Canadian football player
- Daniel Vangarde, French songwriter and producer
- Daniel Varela de Pina (born 1996), Cape Verdean boxer
- Daniel Varela Suanzes-Carpegna (born 1951), Spanish politician
- Daniel Steen Varen (1908–1991), Norwegian politician
- Dániel Varga (born 1983), Hungarian water polo coach and player
- Daniel Vargas, multiple people
- Daniel Martin Varisco, American anthropologist
- Daniel Varoujan (1884–1915), Armenian poet
- Daniel Vasau (born 1982), Tongan rugby league footballer
- Daniel Vasella (born 1953), Swiss businessman
- Daniel Vasev (born 1994), Bulgarian footballer
- Daniel Vasilevski (born 1981), Macedonian-Australian footballer
- Daniel Vasquez (born 1997), Chilean rugby league footballer
- Daniel Vašulín (born 1998), Czech footballer
- Daniel Vaughan (1897–1975), Irish politician
- Daniel Vávra (born 1975), Czech video game entrepreneur
- Daniel de la Vega (1892–1971), Chilean journalist and writer
- Daniel Vega, multiple people
- Daniel Veilleux, American politician
- Daniel Veinbergs (born 1996), Estonian standup comedian
- Daniel Velasques (born 1943), French sprinter
- Daniel Velez (born 1983), Puerto Rican Olympic swimmer
- Daniel Vélez (1973–2021), Colombian footballer
- Daniel Vella (born 1955), Canadian horse trainer
- Daniel Venables (born 1998), Australian rules footballer
- Daniel Vencu Velasquez Castro (born 1994), Swedish politician
- Daniel J. Venters, American judge
- Daniel Verdessi (born 1952), Chilean politician
- Daniel Vernet (1945–2018), French journalist
- Daniel Verník (born 1948), Argentine wrestler
- Daniel C. Verplanck (1762–1834), American politician
- Daniel Verplancke (born 1948), Belgian cyclist
- Daniel Vertangen, Dutch painter
- Dániel Veszelinov (born 2001), Hungarian footballer
- Daniël David Veth (1850–1885), Dutch explorer and photographer
- Daniel Vetter (1657–1721), German organist and composer
- Daniel Vettori (born 1979), New Zealand cricketer
- Daniel Veyt (born 1956), Belgian footballer
- Daniel Vezis (born 1994), Latvian bowler
- Daniel Vicencio (born 1992), Chilean footballer
- Daniel Victor (born 1979), Canadian musician and producer
- Daniel Vidal Fuster (born 1975), Spanish swimmer
- Daniel Vidart (1920–2019), Uruguayan anthropologist and historian
- Daniel Vidot (born 1990), Australian Rugby League player
- Daniel Viejo (born 1997), Spanish cyclist
- Daniel Vier (born 1982), German-Brazilian footballer
- Daniel Vierge (1851–1904), Spanish-born French illustrator
- Daniel Vigeland (1847–1927), Norwegian farmer and politician
- Daniel Viglietti (1939–2017), Uruguayan singer-songwriter and guitarist
- Daniel Viksten (born 1989), Swedish ice hockey player
- Daniel Vilela (born 1983), Brazilian politician
- Daniel Villafañe (born 1993), Argentine gymnast
- Daniel Villalva (born 1992), Argentine footballer
- Daniel Villaseca (born 2003), Czech footballer
- Daniel Vining Jr. (born 1944), American demographer
- Daniel Viotto, Argentinian news presenter
- Daniel Vischer (1950–2017), Swiss politician
- Daniel Visevic (born 1988), Australian soccer player
- Daniel Viteri (born 1981), Ecuadorian footballer
- Daniel Vivian (born 1999), Spanish footballer
- Daniel Vladař (born 1997), Czech ice hockey player
- Daniel Vnukowski (born 1981), Polish Canadian pianist
- Daniel Vogel (born 1991), Mexican footballer
- Daniel Vogelbach (born 1992), American baseball player
- Daniel A. Vogt, American politician
- Daniel Vogt (skier) (born 1972), Liechtenstein alpine skier
- Daniel Voiculescu (born 1956), Romanian rower
- Daniel Voigt (born 1977), Dutch footballer
- Dániel Völgyi (born 1987), Hungarian footballer
- Daniel Volkland, German Paralympic volleyball player
- Daniel Voll, American journalist
- Daniel Von Hoff, American oncologist
- Daniel Voorhees, multiple people
- Daniel Vorcaro (born 1983), Brazilian businessman and entrepreneur
- Daniel Vorländer (1867–1941), German chemist
- Daniel Voß (born 1971), German water polo player
- Daniel Vosmaer (1622–1666), Dutch Golden Age painter
- Daniel Vosovic (born 1981), American fashion designer
- Daniel Vovak (1972–2011), American writer
- Daniel Voytas, American geneticist
- Daniel Voženílek (born 1996), Czech ice hockey player
- Daniel P. Vrakas (born 1955), American politician
- Daniel Vujčić (born 1995), Slovenian footballer
- Daniel Vukovic (born 1986), Canadian-Swiss ice hockey player
- Daniel Vuletic (born 1970), Italian composer and producer

== W ==
- Daniel Wa Wai How (born 1988), Malaysian politician
- Daniël de Waal (1873–1938), South African judge
- Daniel Wadsworth (1771–1848), American artist and collector
- Daniel Wafiuddin (born 1997), Malaysian footballer
- Daniel Waggoner (1828–1902), American rancher
- Daniel Wagner, multiple people
- Daniel Wagon (born 1976), Australian rugby league footballer and coach
- Daniel Guilford Wait, English clergyman, Hebrew scholar and religious writer
- Daniel Waithaka, Kenyan politician
- Daniel Waitzman (born 1943), American flutist and composer
- Daniel Wakefield (1798–1858), New Zealand judge
- Daniel Wakelin (born 1977), English paleographer
- Daniel Nsala Wakpal (born 1975), Ghanaian politician
- Daniel Walcott (born 1994), Canadian ice hockey player
- Daniel Waldenström, Swedish economist and historian
- Daniel Waldo, multiple people
- Daniel Waldron (1775–1821), American merchant
- Daniel Waley (1921–2017), British historian, archivist and academic
- Daniel Walkowitz, American historian
- Daniel E. Wall, American politician
- Daniel Wallace, multiple people
- Daniel Walrath, United States Army general
- Daniel Walsh, multiple people
- Daniel Walter (born 1991), German politician
- Daniel Walters, multiple people
- Daniel Walton, English rugby league footballer and powerlifter
- Daniel Waluszewski, Swedish novelist
- Daniel Wandabula, Zimbabwean Methodist bishop
- Daniel Wang, multiple people
- Daniel Wanjiru (born 1992), Kenyan long-distance runner
- Daniel Wansi (1982–2024), Cameroonian footballer
- Daniel Ward, multiple people
- Daniel Wardwell (1791–1878), American politician
- Daniel Warner, multiple people
- Daniel Washabaugh (1803–1894), American politician
- Daniel Wass (born 1989), Danish footballer
- Daniel Wasson (born 1984), American soccer player
- Daniel Waszkiewicz (born 1957), Polish handball player
- Daniel Waterland (1683–1740), English theologian
- Daniel Waters, multiple people
- Daniel Wathen (born 1939), American judge
- Daniel Watkins, multiple people
- Daniel Watrous, American settler, lawyer and politician
- Daniel Watson, Scottish footballer
- Daniel Wattenberg, American journalist and musician
- Daniel Watters (born 1971), American swimmer
- Daniel Watts, multiple people
- Daniel Waugh, multiple people
- Daniel Way (born 1974), American comic book writer
- Daniel Webb, multiple people
- Daniel Webber, multiple people
- Daniel Weber, multiple people
- Daniel Webster, multiple people
- Daniel Wegner (1948–2013), American psychologist
- Daniel A. Wehrschmidt (1861–1932), German-American artist
- Daniel Weichel (born 1984), German martial artist
- Daniel Weihs (born 1942), Israeli Aeronautical Engineering professor at the Technion – Israel Institute of Technology
- Daniel Weil (born 1953), Argentine architect and inventor
- Daniel Wein (born 1994), German footballer
- Daniel Weinberger (born 1947), American scientist and professor
- Daniel Weinman (born 1988), American poker player
- Daniel Weinreb (1959–2012), American computer programmer
- Daniel Weinstock (born 1963), Canadian philosopher
- Daniel Weiskopf, American philosopher
- Daniel Weiss, multiple people
- Daniel Weissbort (1935–2013), British writer
- Daniel Weitzner, American internet researcher
- Daniel Welbat (born 1989), German musician
- Daniel Welch, multiple people
- Daniel Weld, multiple people
- Daniel Wells, multiple people
- Daniel Wełna (born 1955), Polish sprint canoer
- Daniel Welser (born 1983), Austrian ice hockey player
- Daniel Wenas (born 1992), Indonesian professional basketball player
- Daniel Wende (born 1984), German pair skater
- Daniel Werfel (born 1971), American government official
- Daniel Wermelinger (born 1971), Swiss football referee
- Daniel Wesener (born 1975), German politician
- Daniel Wesley (born 1981), Canadian musician
- Daniel Wesley (athlete) (born 1960), Canadian para-alpine skier
- Daniel West, multiple people
- Daniel Westermark (born 1963), Swedish professional golfer
- Daniel Westling (born 1973), Swedish prince and consort to Victoria, Crown Princess of Sweden
- Daniel Westmattelmann (born 1987), German bicycle racer
- Daniel Weston (born 1983), German cricketer
- Daniel Westphal (born 1970), Northern Mariana Islander footballer
- Daniel Weyandt (born 1981), American vocalist
- Daniel Weyman, British actor
- Daniel D. Wheeler (1841–1916), American soldier and recipient of the Medal of Honor
- Daniel Wheeler (1771–1840), English Quaker missionary
- Daniel Whelan (born 1999), Irish gridiron football player
- Daniel A. Whelton (1872–1953), American politician
- Daniel Whistler, English physician
- Daniel Whiston (born 1976), English ice dancer
- Daniel Whitby, English theologian and bishop
- Daniel F. Whitcomb (1875–1944), American politician
- Daniel White, several people
- Daniel Whitehead Hicky (1900–1976), American poet
- Daniel Whitehouse (born 1995), British cyclist
- Daniel Whiteson (born 1975), American particle physicist
- Daniel Whitney, several people
- Daniel Whyte, multiple people
- Daniel Widing (born 1982), Swedish ice hockey player
- Daniel Widlöcher (1929–2021), French psychiatrist and psychoanalyst
- Daniel Widmer, multiple people
- Daniel Wiederkehr (born 1989), Swiss rower
- Daniel Wiemer (born 1976), German actor
- Daniel Wiener, American sculptor
- Daniel Wier (1772–1842), Canadian politician
- Daniel Wiffen (born 2001), Irish swimmer
- Daniel Wightman (born 1993), New Zealand cricketer
- Daniel Wilcox (born 1977), American football player
- Daniel Wilczynski (born 1956), French footballer
- Daniel Wildenstein (1917–2001), French art dealer and historian
- Daniel Wilding (born 1989), English drummer
- Daniel Wilkie (1843–1917), Australian cricketer
- Daniel Wilkinson, multiple people
- Daniel Willard (1861–1942), American railroad executive
- Daniel Willcox (born 1990), New Zealand sailor
- Daniel Willems (1956–2016), Belgian cyclist
- Daniël Willemsen (born 1975), Dutch side car cross rider
- Daniel Williams, several people
- Daniel Williamson, multiple people
- Daniel T. Willingham, American cognitive psychologist
- Daniel Willington (1942–2025), Argentine footballer
- Daniel Willis (born 1954), Australian clergyman
- Daniel Willman (born 1975), New Zealand tennis player
- Daniel Wilmering (born 2000), Australian soccer player
- Daniel Wilson, several people
- Daniel Wincott (born 1964), British academic
- Daniel Windahl (born 1996), Swedish tennis player
- Daniel Winfree (born 1953), American judge
- Daniel Winkler, multiple people
- Daniel K. Winn (born 1966), American painter
- Daniel Winnik (born 1985), Canadian ice hockey player
- Daniel Winslow (born 1958), American politician
- Daniel E. Winstead (1945–2024), American politician
- Daniel Wirth (1815–1901), Swiss politician and businessman
- Daniel Wise, multiple people
- Daniel Wisgott (born 1988), German rower
- Daniel Wisler (born 1980), American actor
- Daniel Witter, 17th-century Irish Anglican bishop
- Daniel P. Witter (1852–1930), American politician
- Daniel Woge, German painter and drawer
- Daniel Woger (born 1988), Austrian ice hockey player
- Daniel Wohl (born 1980), French-American composer
- Daniel Wolf, multiple people
- Daniel Wolpert (born 1963), British neuroscientist
- Daniel E. Wonderly (1922–2004), American biologist
- Daniel Wong, multiple people
- Daniel Wood, multiple people
- Daniel Phineas Woodbury (1812–1864), Union Army general
- Daniel Woodmansee (1777–1842), American politician
- Daniel Woodrell (1953–2025), American novelist and short story writer
- Daniel Woodriff (1756–1842), Royal Navy officer and navigator
- D. Woodrow Bird (1912–1995), American politician
- Daniel Woodrow, Canadian stand-up comedian
- Daniel Woods (born 1989), American rock climber
- Daniel Woodson (1824–1894), American politician
- Daniel P. Woodward, United States Air Force general
- Daniel Woolard (born 1984), American soccer player
- Daniel Woolf (born 1958), British-Canadian historian
- Daniel Burley Woolfall (1852–1918), President of FIFA
- Daniel Taye Workou (born 1969), German-Ethiopian film director, film producer and screenwriter
- Daniel Worley (1829–1888), American politician and Lutheran pastor
- Daniel Worrall (born 1991), Australian-English cricketer
- Daniel Wozniak, multiple people
- Daniel Wray, 18th-century English antiquarian
- Daniel A. Wren (born 1932), American business theorist and Emeritus Professor at the University of Oklahoma
- Daniel Wright, multiple people
- Daniel G. C. Wu (1883–1956), Chinese-American priest and missionary
- Daniel Wu (born 1974), American actor, director and producer based in Hong Kong
- Daniel Wulf (born 1980), Australian rules footballer
- Daniel Wunderlin (born 1960), Swiss gymnast
- Daniel Wyder (born 1962), Swiss cyclist
- Daniel Wyllie (born 1970), Australian stage, film and television actor
- Daniel Wyser, Swiss curler
- Daniel Albert Wyttenbach (1746–1820), German-Swiss classical scholar

== X ==
- Daniel Xavier Mendes (born 2002), Brazilian Paralympic swimmer
- Daniel Xavier (born 1982), Brazilian archer
- Daniel Xhafaj (born 1977), Albanian footballer
- Daniel Xuereb (born 1959), French footballer

== Y ==
- Daniel Yakopo (born 1988), Rotuman Australians rugby union player
- Daniel Yankelovich (1924–2017), American public opinion analyst and social scientist
- Daniel Yanofsky (1925–2000), Canadian chess grandmaster
- Daniel Yeadon, Australian cellist and viola da gambist
- Daniel Yeboah (born 1984), Ivorian footballer
- Daniel Nana Yeboah (born 1984), Ghanaian footballer
- Daniel S. Yenchesky, American brigadier general
- Daniel Au Yeong (born 2003), Austrian footballer
- Daniel Yergin (born 1947), American business executive and author
- Daniel Abubakar Yisa, Anglican bishop in Nigeria
- Daniel Alfred Yock (1975–1993), Aboriginal Australian dancer
- Daniel Yohannes (born 1952), American businessman
- Daniel Yona (born 1941), Tanzanian politician
- Daniel Yoo (tennis) (born 1985), South Korean tennis player
- Daniel Yoo (general) (born 1962), United States Marine Corps general
- Daniel Yordanov (born 1967), Bulgarian rower
- Daniel Young (politician) (born 1988), Australian politician
- Daniel Young (cricketer) (born 1990), English cricketer
- Thomas Daniel Young (1919–1997), American academic
- Daniel Bellamy, the younger (1715–1788), English writer and divine
- Daniel Dulany the Younger (1722–1797), American politician and lawyer
- Daniel Mijtens the Younger (1644–1688), Dutch Golden Age painter
- Daniel Ytterbom (born 1976), Swedish footballer
- Daniel Yule (born 1993), Swiss alpine skier
- Daniel Yun (born 1958), Singaporean veteran film producer
- Daniel Yuste (1944–2020), Spanish cyclist

== Z ==
- Daniel Zaar (born 1994), Swedish ice hockey player
- Daniel Zacapa (born 1951), American actor
- Daniel Zaccanti (born 1978), Argentine footballer
- Daniel Zacher (born 1988), German footballer
- Daniel Zack (born 1993), American poker player
- Daniel Zaïdani (born 1975), President of the General Council of Mayotte
- Daniel Zaitsev (born 1997), Estonian swimmer
- Daniel Zajfman (born 1959), Israeli physicist
- Daniel Zalewski (born 1992), Polish bobsledder
- Daniel Zamir (born 1978), Israeli saxophonist and singer
- Daniel Zammit-Lewis (born 1993), Maltese squash player
- Daniel Zamora (born 1993), American baseball player
- Daniel Zampieri (born 1990), Italian racing driver
- Daniel Zappelli (born 1964), Swiss lawyer
- Daniel Zaragoza (born 1957), Mexican boxer
- Daniel Zavattiero, Australian businessperson
- Daniel Zayas (born 1957), Cuban weightlifter
- Daniel Zeaiter (born 1995), Footballer
- Daniel Zegeye (born 1979), Ethiopian middle-distance runner
- Daniel Zehender, German Roman Catholic prelate
- Daniel Zeichner (born 1956), British politician
- Daniel Zelinsky (mathematician) (1922–2015), American mathematician
- Daniel Zelman (born 1967), American actor, screenwriter, television producer, and director
- Daniel Zeng, American electrical engineer
- Daniel Zhang (born 1972), Chinese business executive
- Daniel Zhitomirsky (1906–1992), Russian musicologist
- Daniel Ziblatt (born 1972), American political scientist
- Daniel Ziebig (born 1983), German footballer
- Daniel Ziegler (1804–1876), American entomologist
- Daniel M. Ziff (born 1973), American billionaire heir
- Daniel Zimmermann (born 1982), German politician
- Daniel Zingaro, Canadian academic
- Daniel Zion (1883–1979), Bulgarian rabbi
- Daniel Zítka (born 1975), Czech footballer and coach
- Daniel Zlatkov (born 1989), Bulgarian footballer
- Daniel Zohary (1926–2016), Israeli botanist
- Daniel Zolghadri (born 2000), American actor
- Daniel Zolnikov (born 1987), American politician
- Daniel Zomparelli (born 1985), Canadian writer
- Daniel Zovatto (born 1991), Costa Rican actor
- Dániel Zsóri (born 2000), Hungarian footballer
- Daniel Zueras (born 1980), Spanish singer
- Daniel Zuloaga (1852–1921), Spanish ceramicist and painter
- Daniel Zwerdling, American journalist
- Daniel Zwicker (1612–1678), German physician
- Dániel Zwickl (born 1984), Hungarian table tennis player
- Daniel Zygla (born 1990), German darts player

== Fictional characters ==
- Daniel Deronda, the title character of the novel by George Eliot
- Daniel LaRusso, protagonist in The Karate Kid and its sequel Cobra Kai
- Daniel Jackson, a protagonist in the Stargate science fiction franchise
- Daniel "Dan" Kuso, main protagonist of the anime series Bakugan: Battle Brawlers
- Daniel Plainview, the main character in Paul Thomas Anderson's 2008 drama film There Will Be Blood portrayed by Daniel Day-Lewis
- Daniel Raditch, in Degrassi: The Next Generation
- Daniel, in the South Korean action-comedy webtoon Denma

== See also ==
- List of people with given name Dan
- Danny
