= Experimental film in the Netherlands =

Português

Experimental filmmakers ask whether things could not be done differently. Underground films analyse and critique the mainstream film industry. They step back and reflect. Simultaneously, they take forward leaps to assess new options. Sometimes the makers are self-taught visual artists who make innovative work thanks to their original point of view. Other filmmakers primarily play with the medium film and seek an alternative to the dominant visual culture.

== 1920s ==
The history of Dutch experimental or avant-garde film dates back to the 1920s. 1927 saw the publication of a manifesto for the founding of the Filmliga. The movement's leaders Menno ter Braak and E. du Perron's embraced free film art, paying particular attention to the editing, rhythm and composition of films. The Filmliga movement includes the Soviet avant-garde inspired documentaries of Joris Ivens, the scientific films of J.C. Mol (who evoked an aesthetic, abstract world with his 'Het rijk der kristallen') and the work of Andor von Barsy, Paul Schuitema, Willem Bon and Mannus Franken.

== 1960s ==
After a lull during the 1930s and 1940s, primarily a time of playful, poetic films by Bert Haanstra ('Spiegel van Nederland') and Emiel van Moerkerken ('The Cuckoo Waltz (Koekoekswals)'), international avant-garde film underwent a renaissance in 1949 with the foundation of the Knokke-Le-Zoute Experimental Film Festival. Later editions of the festival would screen films by Johan van der Keuken ('Lucebert, dichter-schilder', 1962) and Wim van der Linden/Wim T. Schippers, who filmed a motionless bunch of tulips that drops a single petal at the very end, for their sad movie 'Tulips' (1966). 1967 saw the founding of The New Electric Cinema in Eindhoven, which organised happenings involving music concrete made with vacuum cleaners combined with found footage material.

In 1970, Frans Zwartjes started teaching at the Vrije Academie in The Hague where he became an influential mentor to an entire generation of artists such as Jan Ketelaars, Gijs Schneemann, Matthijs Blonk, George Schouten and Ruud Monster, who constituted the so-called ‘Haagse Psychopolis school’. Zwartjes formulated his method as follows:

“I don't tell them anything. They have to work it out for themselves. There are no rules.”

The 1960s saw the rise of a group of young filmmakers who had been trained at the Nederlandse Filmacademie which was founded in 1958. This new generation, led by Wim Verstappen, Pim de la Parra, Nikolai van der Heyde and Adriaan Ditvoorst, saw themselves as revolutionaries and wanted to give the staid film world a rude awakening. In this respect they were aligned with the Nouvelle Vague and the Neue Deutsche Film.

The epicentre of experimental film up until 1974 was the Electric Cinema, run by STOFF employees Barbara Meter, Mattijn Seip, Nico Paape and Jos Schoffelen. Barbara Meter on those turbulent times:

“You didn't have to fight your way through the hierarchy, but could just grab a camera and get to work.”

Visual artists who used the medium film constituted a relatively independent development within experimental film in the 1960s. The work of Shinkichi Tajiri, who lived in the Netherlands, attracted attention from the early 1960s onwards and from the end of that decade, he was joined by conceptual artists such as Jan Dibbets, Bas Jan Ader, Peter Struycken, Marinus van Boezem, Ger van Elk and Michel Cardena. In the 1970s, movements such as structuralist film lost ground and were replaced by films with a critical subtext. Together with Willum Thijssen and Paul de Mol, Peter Rubin founded Holland Experimental Film (HEF) the principal goal of which was to screen Dutch experimental films abroad.

== 1980s ==
This decade is known as the golden age of video art. The latter's breakthrough in the Netherlands was the ‘Sonsbeek buiten de perken’ festival in Arnhem in 1972. From 1985 to 1995, the AVÉ festival was organised in Arnhem, which later morphed into the Hard Kijken festival. The World Wide Videofestival took place for the first time in 1982. Two years later the exhibition The Illuminous Light was organised at the Stedelijk Museum in Amsterdam. And the Impakt Festival was founded in 1988. In their work, conceptual artists such as Dibbets, Van Elk, Boezem, Struycken and the Columbian Raoul Marroquin who resided in the Netherlands, experimented with video. Other important filmmakers from the 1980s were Frank Scheffer, Noud Heerkens, Gerard Holthuis, Ruud Monster, Frederieke Jochems and Andras Hamelberg, Pieter Moleveld and Barbara Meter, who started working again after a 10-year break. The Kunstkanaal – a weekly video art show on cable TV in Amsterdam, Rotterdam and The Hague, was founded in 1987.

== 1990s ==
Screening opportunities arose for a new generation of filmmakers thanks to the founding of Cinema De Balie in 1996, the professionalisation of the Nederlands Instituut voor Mediakunst and the Mind The Gap evenings at De Unie in Rotterdam. During the 1990s new initiatives, such as Studio Eén in Arnhem (later De Werkplaats in Rotterdam), the Filmstad foundation in The Hague and Lazy Marie in Utrecht, primarily focused on the production of 8 mm or 16 mm, low-budget films. During the 1990s, filmmakers such as Joost Rekveld, Aryan Kaganof, Jeroen Eisinga, Karel Doing, Jop Horst, Francien van Everdingen, Lonnie van Brummelen, Jan Willem van Dam and Martha Colburn garnered attention. The decade also saw a resurgence of experimental animation and abstract film. Joost Rekveld had the following to say about his light films that are all made without a camera and are all named after prime numbers:

“To me, maths is not a cult of numbers and abstractions. It is very concrete.”

== 2000 to the present ==
In the preceding years, experimental film seemed to be overshadowed by video art, but during the early years of the 21st century, it once again attracted attention, particularly from artists. (source: mm2) De Filmbank, which inventories, presents and distributes contemporary Dutch experimental film in all sorts of ways (through rental, entries to Dutch and foreign film festivals, publications and DVDs), was founded in 2001 by Karel Doing, Anna Abrahams, Peter Van Hoof and others. The Filmmuseum conserves experimental films in the framework of the 'Collectie Nederland van de Experimentele Film' project, this was followed by a Filmbank tour which included films by Barbara Meter, Henri Plaat and Frans Zwartjes. Plaat refers to his films as 'incantations', Meter refers to a

“proposal to experience time and space differently”

and Zwartjes says:

“The only useful answer to the crap around you is art.”

Rotterdam gained another screening venue with the Worm, while the Rotterdamse Filmwerkplaats organises workshops for filmmakers. The Filmmuseum also conserved another selection of the Dutch experimental heritage and this was screened at the festival Filmmuseum Experimenteel in 2008.
