= Daniel Voigt =

Dutch footballer

Personal information
- Date of birth: 4 November 1977 (age 48)
- Place of birth: Warnsveld, Netherlands
- Height: 1.87 m (6 ft 2 in)
- Position: Defender

Senior career*
Years	Team	Apps	(Gls)
1996–2000	PSV Eindhoven		
1997–1998	→ De Graafschap (loan)		
1998–1999	→ FC Den Bosch (loan)		
2000–2006	Helmond Sport		
2006–2007	Fortuna Sittard		
2007–2009	Wuppertaler SV		
2009	1. FC Kleve		
2009–2011	JVC Cuijk		

International career
- Netherlands U21
- * Club domestic league appearances and goals

Daniel Voigt (born 4 November 1977) is a retired Dutch football defender.
