= Miguel-Ángel Cárdenas =

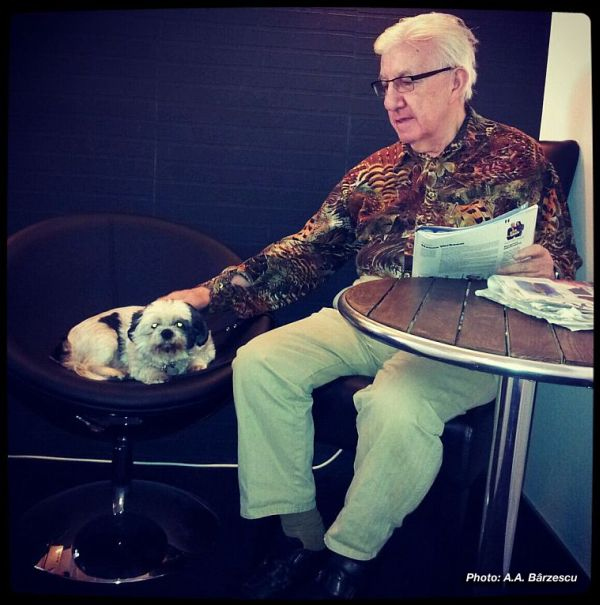
- Miguel-Ángel Cárdenas in 2012
- Born: October 3, 1934; Espinal, Colombia
- Died: June 2, 2015 (aged 80); Amsterdam, Netherlands
- Known for: Painting, Video art, Drawing, Photography, Assemblage art
- Movement: Pop art, Nouveau réalisme

Miguel-Ángel Cárdenas (October 3, 1934 – June 2, 2015), also known as Michel Cardena, was a Colombian-Dutch Nouveau réalisme and pop art painter and a pioneer of video art in the Netherlands. His works cover a variety of artistic media, including painting, drawing, video, photography, object assemblages and digital art.

== Biography ==
Miguel-Ángel Cárdenas was born in Espinal, Colombia in 1934. Between 1953 and 1957 he studied architecture at the National University of Colombia in Bogotá, Colombia, and visual art at the Escuela de Bellas Artes Bogota. In 1961 the Ministry of Culture of Colombia awarded him a scholarship to study at the Barcelona School of Graphic Arts.

In 1962 he moved to the Netherlands and has been living there ever since. Shortly after his arrival in the Netherlands, Cárdenas got a solo exhibition in the Gemeentemuseum Den Haag, and participated in the great exhibition "Pop Art and New Realism" (1964 -1965; The Hague, Brussels, Vienna, Berlin) that also featured works by Marcel Duchamp, Andy Warhol, Roy Lichtenstein and Claes Oldenburg.

Cárdenas was one of the ten artists invited by then Crown Princess, HM Queen Beatrix of the Netherlands for a series of cultural soirees at the Drakesteijn Castle in 1969. His performance was called "Symphony for seven waiters", and it also included Prince Claus, Wim Beeren, Marinus Boezem, Ad Dekkers, Jan Dibbets and Peter Struycken.

Between 1963 and 1978, he was awarded several scholarships from the Ministry of Culture of the Netherlands, including a travel grant to travel to the United States and Canada.

Cárdenas started working with video as an artistic medium in 1970. Two years later, teaming up with Sigurdur Gudmundsson, Pieter Laurens Mol and Ulises Carrión, he founds the 'In-Out Center'-First Credit Union of Artists in the Netherlands, the first Dutch artists' cooperative with its own gallery situated on Reguliersgracht in Amsterdam. The cross-border events held here were an important impetus for the development of body art, performance and new art forms in the Netherlands. Wies Smals was inspired by this center to initiate De Appel in 1975.

In 1986, Cárdenas decided to return to his original form of art: painting.

Throughout the 70's and the 80's, Cárdenas lectured at various Dutch art schools, including the Rietveld Academy, AKI, and the Academy of Fine Arts and Architecture in Arnhem.

His works were featured at the exhibition ' Snapshot No.5' (1989) in the Stedelijk Museum, Amsterdam. The director of the Stedelijk Museum, Wim Beeren wrote into the exhibition catalog:

"The Netherlands had barely heard of Pop Art, New Realism or Duchamp when Michel Cardena came from Colombia to our country with a huge baggage of knowledge about the new developments in art.” ('Snapshot No. 5' - Stedelijk Museum, Amsterdam 1989).

In 1990 Cárdenas won the third prize at the First Triennial of Painting, in Osaka, Japan. A year later he is awarded a study scholarship from the Foundation of Art, Design and Architecture in the Netherlands to study calligraphy in Tokyo, Japan

His work has been frequently supported by grants from the Dutch government and exhibited in solo and group shows in the Netherlands and around the world.

In 2004 Cárdenas was elevated to the rank of Officer in the Order of Orange-Nassau by Queen Beatrix of the Netherlands.

== Video work ==
Cárdenas started working with video because of the new opportunities it offered. He created a large and varied body of video work that explores many themes including sexuality, desire and his own Latin American heritage. His videos range in approach from the grayscale real-time style typical of early 1970s recorded performances to elaborate narratives and montages that make use of more advanced editing techniques. Cárdenas' works often involve elements of campy humor, including frequent parodies of the masochistic attitude that some performance artists have towards their bodies. Cárdenas' videos sometimes employ figures of duality which contrast or duplicate one another.

One of the central visual elements in Cardenas’ video works was heat. His live performances were variations of the same theme: heating people or objects, in his attempt to melt away the cold detachment of the Dutch society. Since 1971, he has been operating under the name "Cardena Warming up etc. etc. etc. Company".

Cárdenas authored a private publication titled “Black and white and sometimes colorful No. 2”(Amsterdam 1980), consisting of 14 A4 pages folded and bound together. This publication extensively describes two of his performances released earlier that year, titled "Black and white and sometimes colorfoul No. 2" and "Peaceful new year, 108 years after Bertrand Russell". The publication also includes articles from Documenta 6 on video art, an interview with Wies Smals and two other performances ("My name is beautiful" from 1978 and "I am waiting for you" from 1979).

His video works were exhibited at several museums and galleries, including the Museum of Modern Art in New York City in 1981. In the same year he participated in the large retrospective exhibition in Museum Boijmans Van Beuningen in Rotterdam.

== Museums and exhibitions ==
- Banco de la República, Bogotá, Colombia
- Stedelijk Museum, Amsterdam, Netherlands
- Museum Boymans-van Beuningen, Rotterdam, Netherlands
- Gemeente Museum, The Hague, Netherlands
- Bodenseemuseum, Friedrichshafen, Germany
- Borås Konstmuseum, Borås, Sweden
- Moderna Museet, Stockholm, Sweden
- Het Princessehof, Leeuwarden, Netherlands
- Amro Bank Collection, Amsterdam, Netherlands
- Bessel and Pierrete Kok Collection, Brussels, Belgium
- Professor Shigenobu Kimura Collection, Osaka, Japan
- Hara Museum, Tokyo, Japan
- Collectie Bouwfonds, Hoevelaken, Netherlands
- Bonhefanten Museum, Maastricht, Netherlands
- Wetering Galerie, Amsterdam, Netherlands
- Museo de Arte Moderno de Medellín
- museo de ate modeno de medellin

== See also ==
- Experimental film in the Netherlands
