= Marko Vuokola =

Finnish conceptual artist

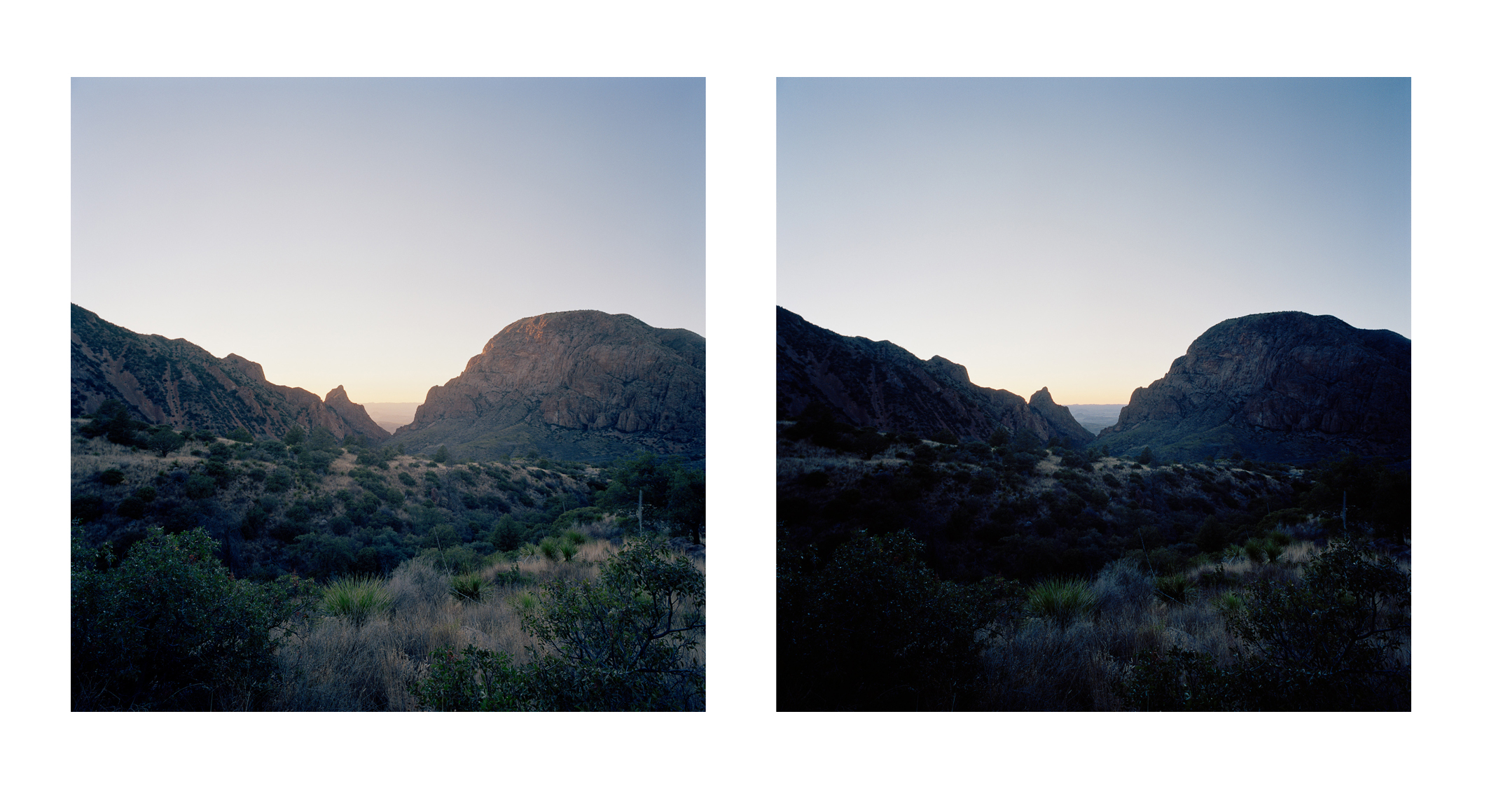
Marko Vuokola, The Seventh Wave - Window, 2007

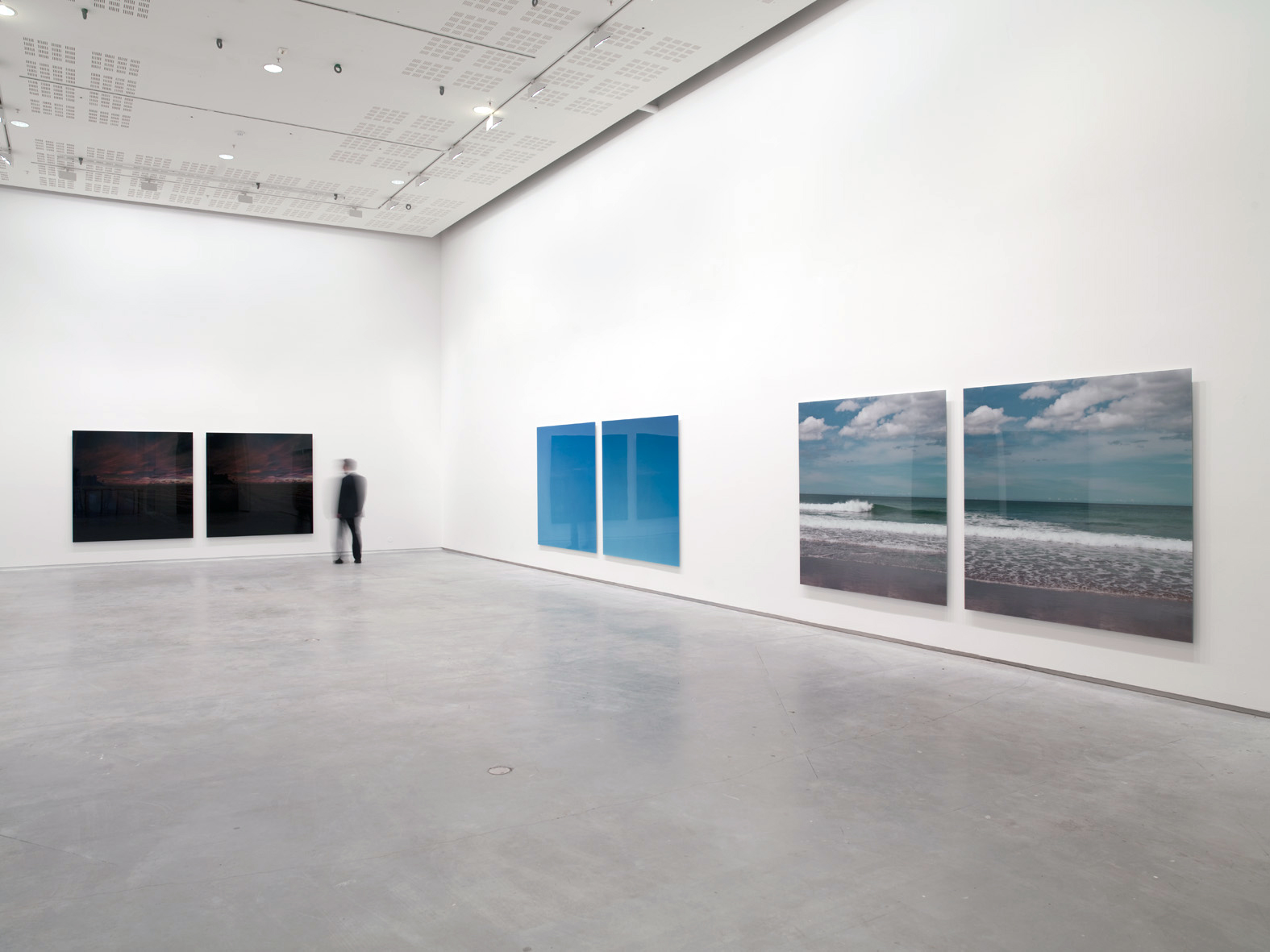
Installation view from exhibition "Marko Vuokola, The Seventh Wave" at SKMU Sørlandets Kunstmuseum in 2012

Marko Vuokola (born 1967) is a Finnish conceptual artist. He lives and works in Helsinki, Finland.

== Early life and education ==
Marko Vuokola was born in Toijala, Finland as the youngest son of photographer Aimo Vuokola and Tuula Vuokola. He studied at the Department of Sculpture at the Finnish Academy of Fine Arts, Helsinki from 1987 and received a BA in 1991, followed by studies in Media Arts at AKI (Academie voor Kunst en Industrie) in Enschede, the Netherlands 1991-92. He graduated with an MA from the Finnish Academy of Fine Arts in 2001.

== Work ==
Vuokola works across a wide variety of media and materials, departing often from a conceptual exploration of issues relating to time and space. Many works, particularly in his collaborations in the OLO collective (together with Pasi Eerik Karjula), have a strongly installational and site-related character. Despite his training as a sculptor, much of his artistic oeuvre is based on photography, video or computer animation. He is often mentioned as a photographer, although it is more proper to describe his work as based on ideas just as much as on materials. His works often also explore the optical and other aspects of his artistic media, like the camera or the video projector.

=== Gold Thread, 1995 ===
During the summer of 1995, Vuokola spent five weeks in remote Palsinoja in the Finnish Lapland digging for gold. The 4 grams of gold that he collected were stretched into a thin thread only 0,12 mm thick and approximately 7 m long. The work deals with time just as much as with the precious material, and also with the concepts of sculpture and visuality in art. The thread can hardly be seen when stretched across a wall, while it represents a considerable amount of physical work. The work was exhibited at Henry Moore institute, Leeds, in 1996 and later acquired by Kiasma, the Finnish national museum of contemporary art.

=== The Seventh Wave, 2001- ===
In 2001 Vuokola started up the series of works that he is most known for, The Seventh Wave. In these photographic diptychs, each panel depicts what might seem an identical motive. The difference between the images can be described in terms of time, as an unknown amount of time has passed between the two exposures. The difference is also a matter of space and material, as the physical and light circumstances have changed, even if these differences might be very small. The camera remains in the same position during these exposures. Many of these works have been shot outdoors, but this does not mean it is a series of landscape images, as several interiors and even seemingly abstract motives are included in the series. The Seventh Wave includes landscapes from Finland, park views from the Versailles of Louis XIV, the surroundings of Donald Judd’s Marfa in Texas, interiors and exteriors from Hong Kong, Great Barrier Island in New Zealand, seascapes from Vietnam, a car vendor’s display room and the artist’s home and neighbourhood. The title of the series comes from the popular belief that, on the sea, the seventh wave tends to be the largest.

=== RGB Series, 1996- ===
Starting as an experiment with a projector displaying a video of the projector itself – very much in the spirit of Nam June Paik’s work – RGB-light (1996) became just as much a study of how projected light behaves when interacting with visitors. The projection itself is in black and white, but the light cast on the wall of the exhibition space is prismatically split into a variety of colours, depending on how the three additive primary colours (red, green and blue) of the RGB projector are affected by the movement of visitors in the space. A continued experimentation with the possibilities within these aspects of optics has resulted also in the prints RGB (1996-2012) and the computer animation RGB-information (2005).

=== The Anatomy of Images, 2012- ===
Originating in experiments with images of streaming water (Tammerkoski, 2012), Vuokola started exploring the very fundaments of digital photography. In Flora (sharpen), a large diptych of a Norwegian waterfall from the same year, a small selection of pixels from the center of each of the two digital files were enlarged to form a new diptych of their own. The connection in this case to landscape imagery is essential, as the work approaches the basics of the construction of visuality as well as digital images.

== Collaborations ==
Together with fellow artist Pasi Eerik Karjula, Vuokola has formed the OLO collective since 1990. OLO primarily works with site-engaged installations and commissions. The collaboration has resulted in over 50 works, most of them outside of Finland. The best known of these is the extensive public art work for Hietalahti Square in Helsinki (OLO No. 22, 2000). Another long term collaboration although less formalised is the Forest Camp collective, which was formed in 1998. Forest Camp functions as a think tank for immaterial work and temporary public interventions.

== Exhibitions ==
Vuokola’s solo exhibitions include a major presentation at SKMU Sørlandets kunstmuseum in Norway in 2011, followed by a large intervention with his works installed together with the collection of Trondheim Kunstmuseum in 2012-13, for which a book was published documenting the installations. He has shown extensively with Galerie Anhava in Helsinki since 1992. He was in 1994 the youngest artist to be presented with a solo exhibition at the Museum of Contemporary Art in Ateneum, the Finnish National Gallery in Helsinki.

Among Vuokola's most important group exhibitions are Melbourne International Biennial 1999 (in OLO collaboration with Pasi Eerik Karjula; curator Juliana Engberg); "Rock the Campo" organised by Frame Finnish Funf for Art Exchange at the 49th Venice Biennale 2001; "From Dust to Dusk" at Charlottenborg in Copenhagen 2003 (curator Pontus Kyander); "Gridlock: cities, structures, spaces" at Govett-Brewster Art Gallery in New Plymouth, New Zealand (curator Simon Rees); "Sense of the Real" at Ars 06, Kiasma in Helsinki 2006 (with collective Forest Camp, curated by Tuula Karjalainen and Jari-Pekka Vanhala); "Super Structures" a public art project in Ho Chi Minh City, Vietnam, 2008 (curators Sue Hajdu & Pontus Kyander); "Entr'acte" at Kukje Gallery in Seoul, South Korea 2009 (curator Pontus Kyander); "East of the Sun and West of the Moon" at Växjö Konsthall, Sweden 2012; and "Memories can’t wait – Film without film", 60th International Short Film Festival Oberhausen, Germany (curator Mika Taanila).

== Collections ==
Vuokola is represented in many public collections in Finland, such as the Kiasma Museum of Contemporary Art, Helsinki City Art Museum, EMMA – Espoo Museum of Modern Art, The Collection of the Finnish State, The Finnish Museum of Photography in Helsinki, Tampere Museum of Contemporary Art, and Sara Hildén Art Museum in Tampere.

His works are also included in the Malmö Art Museum in Sweden, the collection of Public Art Agency Sweden, Stockholm, SKMU Sørlandets Kunstmuseum in Kristiansand, Norway and Trondheim Kunstmuseum, Norway.

== Art market ==
Vuokola's works have only rarely surfaced on the secondary market, but when a mid-size (125 x 125 cm x 2) diptych from The Seventh Wave-series depicting the Versailles park in France was auctioned on Christie's in London in 2008, the price reached £15,625 ($23,375), over twice its estimate.
