= AKI Academy for Art & Design =

Art academy in Enschede, Netherlands

Coordinates: 52.2342°N 6.8963°E

AKI ArtEZ Academy of Art & Design
- Motto: The Future is Handmade
- Type: Art academy
- Established: 1946
- Parent institution: ArtEZ University of the Arts
- Director: Ina Bode
- Students: c. 300
- Location: Enschede, Netherlands
- Website: aki.artez.nl

AKI ArtEZ Academy of Art & Design (formerly Academie of Art & Industry) is an art academy in the city of Enschede, the Netherlands, founded in 1946. The school is part of ArtEZ University of the Arts, which also has departments in Arnhem and Zwolle.

== History ==
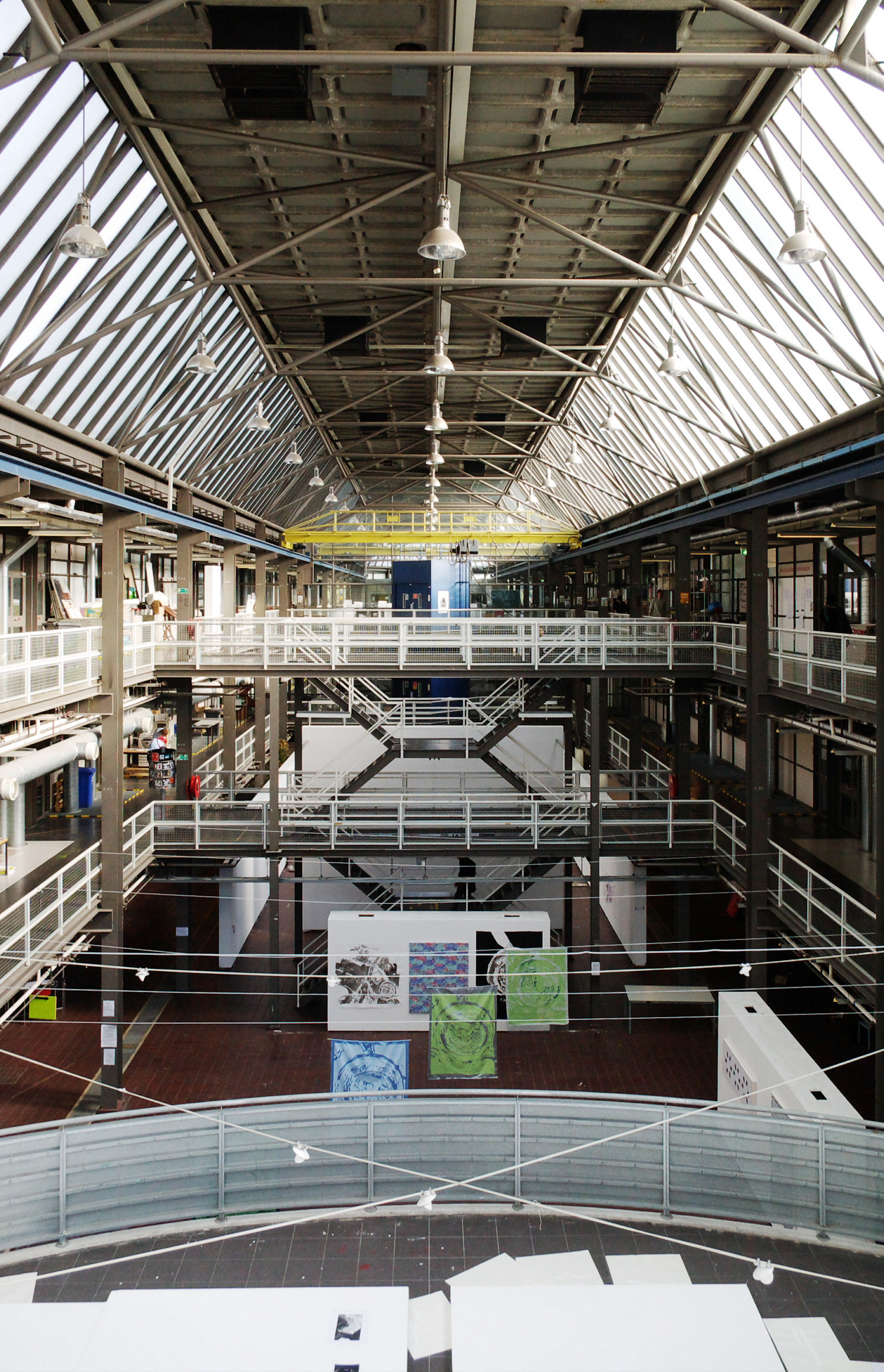
The Technohal on the University of Twente campus, one of the previous locations of the school

The Academie of Art and Design was founded in 1946 by a group of textile manufacturers, educating fabric designers for the local textile industry. Dirk de Leeuw of the Instituut voor Kunstnijverheidsonderwijs was director until 1955, he was succeeded by drawing teacher Bram Middelhoek (1906–1968). After some fifteen years as a traditional arts and crafts school, in 1968 the new director Joop Hardy set the school on a course towards free modern art.

Hardy was succeeded by the artist Sipke Huismans, who was director from 1981 to 2001.[4]

For a long time the institution was housed on the Roessinghsbleekweg in a school building from 1957, designed by Arno Nicolaï. In 1998 the school moved into the ‘Technohal’ (a former chemical laboratory) on Hallenweg on the campus of the University of Twente. Since 2013 the school is housed in the TETEM 2 building in the Roombeek district of Enschede. Until June 2015 the school had a dependence for painting students in the former village school of Twekkelo.

Since 2002, AKI forms part of the organisational structure of ArtEZ University of the Arts. In early 2013 the academy moved to the former textile site TETEM II on Hulsmaatstraat in the Roombeek district.

== Controversies ==
In 2017 the director at that time, Marc Boumeester, was temporarily suspended after he was caught using drugs with students.

In September 2022 the school made news after a lawsuit from a wrongfully suspended student brought to light accounts of a fear culture.

== Alumni ==
A selection of well known past students:

- Daan Roosegaarde
- Anne Wenzel
- Irma Boom
- Jaap Drupsteen
- Jeroen Jongeleen
- Jop Horst
- Bas Kosters
- Ine Lamers
- Fra Paalman
- Marko Vuokola
- Ronald Ophuis
