= Philip Kouwen =

Dutch artist (1922–2002)

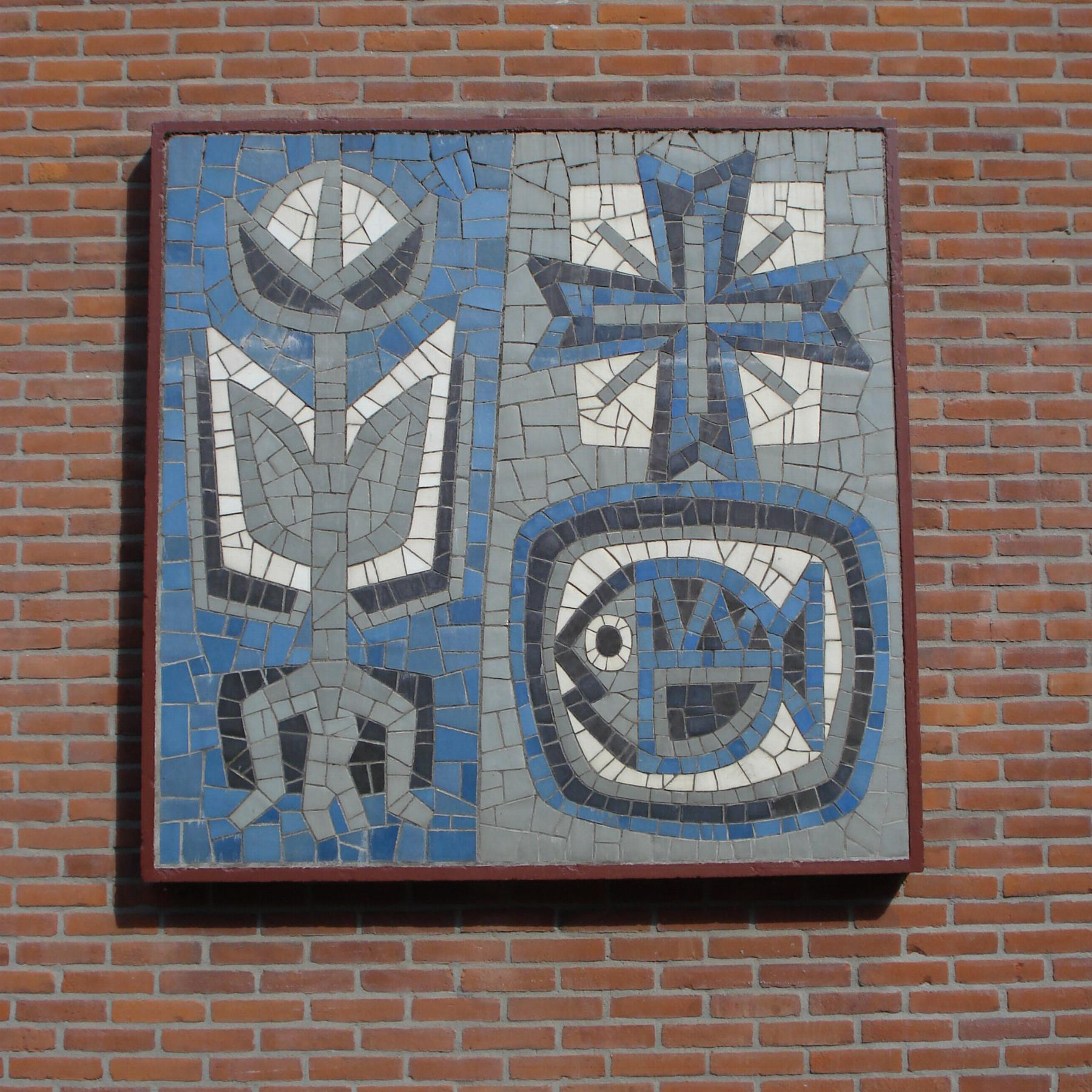
Relief by Kouwen in Dordrecht

Philip Kouwen (18 June 1922, in Rotterdam – 17 December 2002, in Warnsveld) was a Dutch artist notable for his graphic works, mostly landscapes and cityscapes which used grey color.

Kouwen graduated from the Rotterdam Academy of Art. Rotterdam was badly damaged during World War II, and after the war, in 1949, Kouwen with a group of his former classmates moved to Dordrecht, where it was easier to rent an atelier. In Dordrecht, he became a member of the Pictura Art Society, and between 1949 and 1961 he had his atelier at Pictura. From 1956 onward, he was teaching at the AKI, Academy for Art and Design in Enschede. Among his many students were, for example, Elly Meijer, Fra Paalman, and Tom Waterreus.

Kouwen started his career as a painter, but since the end of the 1950s, he also started working as a graphics designer, which shifted his interests to graphics, in particular, drawing. He started creating cityscapes (most notably, of Dordrecht) and landscapes in the 1960s. Since the 1970s, he exclusively worked with black chalk. In 1984, Kouwen moved from Dordrecht to Warnsveld, and landscapes of Gelderland became his favorite topic, along with still-lifes.

In 1998, the Dordrechts Museum organised a retrospective of his oeuvre. The museum also contains a collection of his works. A number of drawings were bought by the Rijksprentenkabinet in Amsterdam.
