= Sdu (publishing company) =

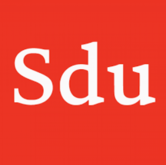
- Parent company: Lefebvre Sarrut
- Country of origin: Netherlands
- Publication types: books, magazines
- Official website: www.sdu.nl

Sdu is a Dutch publishing company, whose name derives from the company's origin as the Staatsdrukkerij en Uitgeverij, typically abbreviated as Staatsdrukkerij; the company started as the official publisher ("State Printing House") of Dutch governmental publications and of documents such as passports and voter registration cards. Along with the Staatscourant, it was the first Dutch company to receive the appellation "royal", awarded in 1806 by Louis-Napoléon Bonaparte.

== History ==
Sdu became independent of the state in 1988, although the state maintained ownership of the shares. The company was reorganized, shifting its focus towards publishing rather than printing. In 1999 the company ceased printing the phone book; this lowered profits by 11%. Plans for privatization began to be made in 2000. In that same year, together with the printers Joh. Enschedé, Sdu began printing the new Dutch passports, designed by Jaap Drupsteen. (The combination was called Enschedé/Sdu, later renamed Sdu Identification.) In 2006, the government put the company up for sale, and it was acquired in March 2007 by Dutch investment company AAC Capital Partners (formerly ABN Amro Capital) and Dutch investor ACP Capital Partners, who each own 50% of the shares. The Dutch state made €330,000,000 from the sale.

The company became the subject of national media attention and controversy in 2006, when it became known that hundreds of blank passports and identity cards had been stolen from its printing facility in Haarlem. The theft occurred in 2002. Although discovered by Sdu, the company did not report it to the police until 2004, when falsified identity papers made with the blanks began to turn up. Former employees with possible ties to Nigerian organized crime were suspected. In part because of the scandal, Sdu Identification, or Sdu-I, was sold in 2008 to the French company SAGEM, a division of Safran.

By 2010 Sdu employed 650 people; in 2008 its revenue was €217,000,000, but in 2011 it was only €130,000,000. In 2013, Sdu was taken over by the French publishing company Editions Lefebvre Sarrut, or ELS, which was particularly interested in Sdu's portfolio of fiscal, governmental, and legal books and magazines.

Notable publications by the Sdu include the series The Kingdom of the Netherlands During World War II.

== Design ==
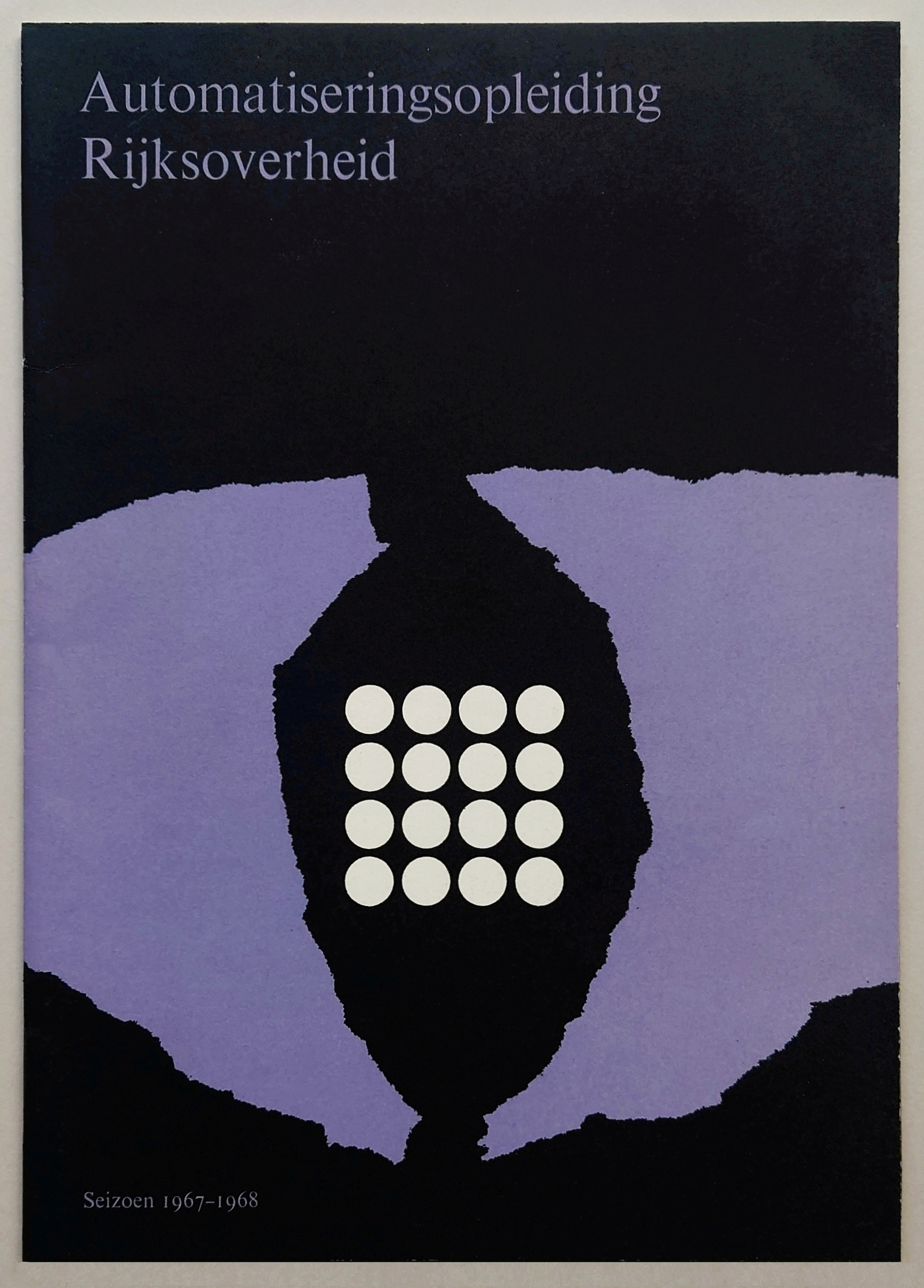
Booklet designed by Staatsdrukkerij / Fra Paalman, 1967.

After World War II a concerted effort was made to improve the design of all products; besides printed material, that included the logo. Printer and typographer Jean François van Royen had already condemned the state-printed material as ugly in 1912, and after the war P. Knuttel decided "to make everything printed by the government readable and pleasing to the eye".

Notable designers who learned the trade with the Sdu are Fra Paalman, who worked there in the 1960s, and Hans Kentie, who worked there in the 1970s. According to Kentie, Anne Vondeling, then President of the House of Representatives of the Netherlands, was adamant that legislation and reports be done in a layout attractive also to the general reader and the bookstore.
