= Anne Wenzel =

German artist (born 1972)

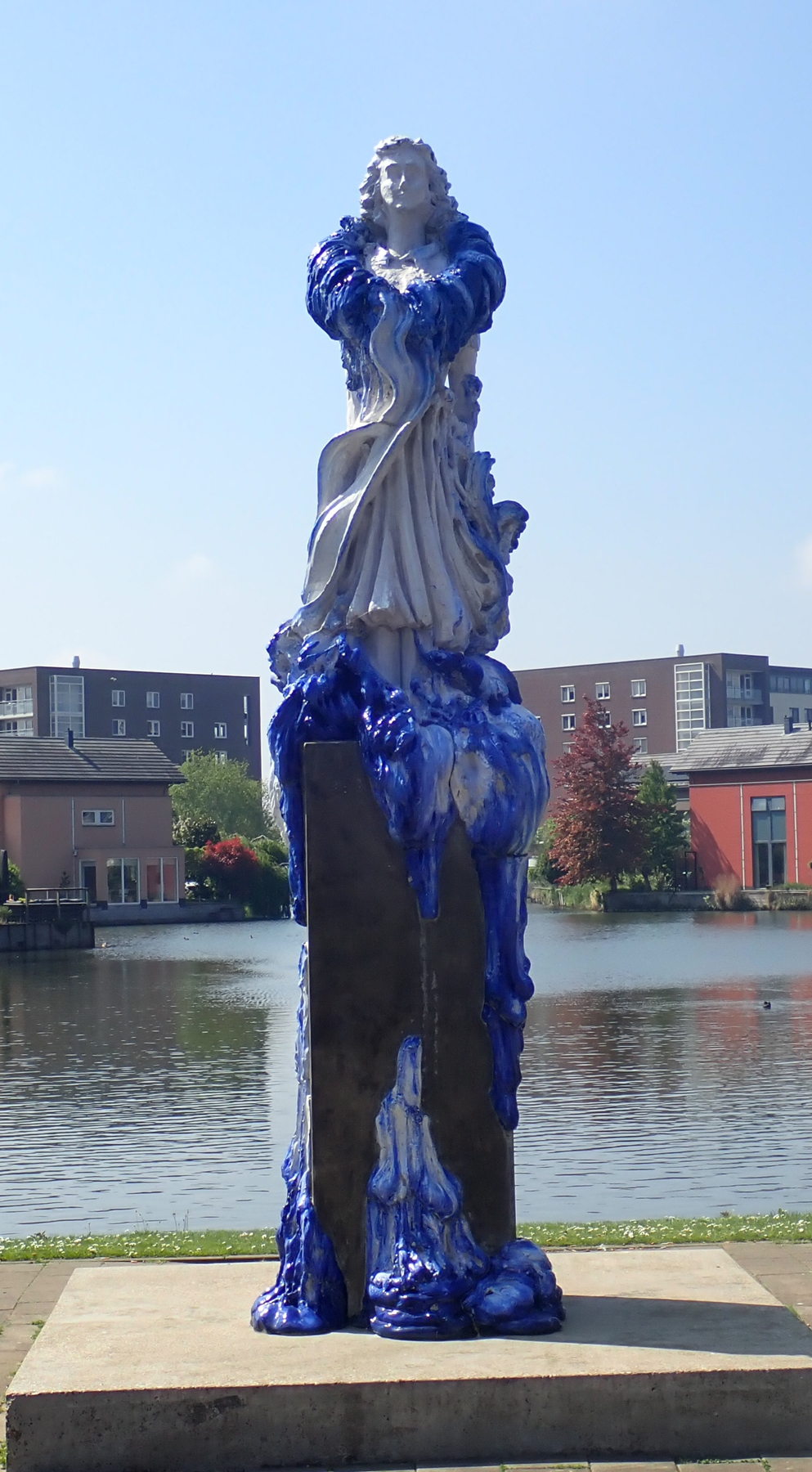
- Public installation by Anne Wenzel in Barendrecht
- Born: 23 May 1972 (age 53); Schüttorf, Germany
- Education: AKI Academy for Art & Design
- Known for: Sculpture, installation, ceramics

Anne Wenzel (born 23 May 1972 in Schüttorf, Germany) is a German sculptor and installation artist who mainly works with ceramics.

== Life and career ==
Wenzel was born in the German town Schüttorf in Lower Saxony, close to the Dutch border. Between 1992 and 1997 she studied at the AKI in Enschede, Netherlands. Wenzel briefly studied at the Escola Massana in Barcelona, Spain, between 1995 and 1996 and followed two residencies at the Europees Keramisch Werkcentrum (European Centre for Ceramics). She currently lives and works in Rotterdam, Netherlands.

Wenzel has been nominated for several art awards, including the Prix de Rome in 2007 and the Dolf Henkes prize in 2009. In 2014 she won the 1st prize at the European Ceramic Context in Bornholm and in 2010 the Sidney Meyer Fund Australian Ceramic Award in the category "International Artist".

== Work and exhibitions ==
Wenzel makes installations consisting of a number of monumental images that occupy the entire space. Themes such as heroism, heroism and decay inspire her. She herself says she wants to express a struggle between beauty and decay with her sculptures. That is why she experiments with different types of glaze, colors and other processing techniques of the ceramics, so that the works partly shine and partly appear very rough or seem to melt.

In 2010 she was commissioned by Museum Boijmans Van Beuningen in Rotterdam to make the installation 'Requiem of Heroism', a room-filling installation of ceramics and steel. The collection of the Rotterdam museum also includes the work "z.t. (black girl)" that Wenzel made in 2003. In 2014 she had a solo exhibition in TENT Rotterdam. This exhibition, 'The Opaque Palace', consisted of large space-filling installations of various sculptures, all made of ceramics. The images, such as a forest of pine trees, fallen chandeliers and withered flower arrangements, represent the past glory of Imperial Germany.

Wenzel's work is included in various private and institutional collections, including that of the Stedelijk Museum voor Actuele Kunst in Ghent.
