= Ronald Ophuis =

Dutch painter

- Born: 1968; Hengelo, Netherlands

Ronald Ophuis (born 1968 in Hengelo, Netherlands) is a Dutch artist. His paintings represent acts of physical, sexual and psychological violence and elicit strong emotional responses. For this reason, they are often considered to be controversial.

== Biography ==
Ophuis grew up in the Twente region of the Netherlands and now lives and works in Amsterdam. He studied at the Gerrit Rietveld Academie in Amsterdam (1988–1990) and the AKI Academy for Art & Design in Enschede (1990–1993).

=== Work ===
Ophuis often paints on large canvases, the largest of which are over three meters high. Because of this, the human subjects are often the same size as the viewer. He works from photograph studies that are either taken during his travels or staged with actors. Ophuis' painting technique involves building up and scraping away paint to create rough textures.

Ophuis is known for his confrontational depictions of sexual, physical, and psychological violence. He first became interested in violence as an art subject during his childhood. He grew up in a Roman Catholic environment and was especially interested in the story of the crucifixion: "I found myself wondering who the people were [who were] calling for Christ's death." Ophuis draws inspiration from multiple sources. Footballers (1996), which shows three young footballers sodomizing a teammate with a Coca-Cola bottle, is based on a memory of a scene he witnessed in his youth. He also paints scenes that he has imagined or that are based on stories others have told him. Before painting Birkenau I (2002), a scene he imagined which shows two male concentration camp inmates raping a female fellow inmate, Ophuis consulted many concentration camp survivors and two rabbis. He wanted to obtain consent from survivors to paint a scene that would show victims of violence perpetrating violence. He said that "[t]hey indicated that they appreciate someone making a work about something for which they themselves often could not find words."

The aftermath and background events of contemporary wars have been the subjects of many of Ophuis' paintings. In 2003, he traveled to Srebrenica to interview survivors and witnesses to the Srebrenica massacre; he then painted the Srebrenica series (2004–2008). In 2010, Ophuis traveled to Sierra Leone to interview former child soldiers and painted a series of portraits of them. A camera crew traveled with him to film the documentary Painful Painting. The documentary focuses on the process of painting The Bet, Boy or Girl (2012), which depicts four soldiers restraining a pregnant woman before cutting her open to learn the unborn child's sex. This painting is based on a story one of the interviewees told Ophuis.

==== Controversies ====
In 1997, Ophuis' painting Sweet Violence (1996), which depicts three men sexually abusing two children, was removed from an exhibition in the Bergkerk in Deventer after public outcry. Ophuis filed and won a lawsuit, but now considers this a "Pyrrhic victory".

===== Historical and contemporary examples =====
Ophuis’ paintings can be related to the tradition of history painting in which he follows the Realistic mode. His works shows similarities with works by realistic history painters such as Édouard Manet. Like in Manet's painting The Execution of Emperor Maximilian (1867), the Ophuis’ paintings show a single moment in a most neutral way. Rather than the victim, the perpetrator is in the centre of the scene. Also, there are no clues of a pre-history, or of a closure. There is no dramatic lightning that suggests an unfolding of time. In short there are no metaphysical and moral dimensions which are so predominant in a biblical scene.

His large works from the last few years demonstrate how he has primarily looked to the nineteenth century for references; to the likes of Goya, Géricault, Delacroix, Courbet and Manet (a tradition continued in the 20th century by Picasso, Golub and Richter, with Jeff Wall as the contemporary exponent).

In present time Ophuis’ paintings can be compared to David Fincher’s film Fight Club (1999). Just like the paintings the film gives no answer whether it condemns or celebrates the violence it shows. The film and the paintings are therefore often subject to the same critique. The viewer expects a representation to be a sequence of events, or a source of information. In relation to the majority of mass media representations, Ophuis is as exceptional as Fincher. Ophuis is not performing a representational practice in which the viewer is directed in how to process or digest the representation, especially when it concerns issues of violence. Ophuis does not give a direction in his paintings and the viewer is compelled to make his own moral judgement.

== Legacy ==
=== Museums and institutions ===
Ronald Ophuis' work has been on show at:

- Centraal Museum, Utrecht
- Museum der bildenden Künste, Leipzig
- GEMAK, The Hague
- Zoya Museum, Slovakia
- Museum Jan Cunen, Oss
- Kunsthal, Rotterdam
- Stedelijk Museum, Schiedam
- Museum De Vleeshal, Haarlem
- Stedelijk Museum Amsterdam
- Stedelijk Museum Bureau Amsterdam
- De Appel, Amsterdam
- Gemeentemuseum Den Haag The Hague
- Kunstraum Innsbruck

=== Awards ===
- 2004 Jeanne Oosting Prize
- 2002 Nomination Wolvecamp Prize
- 1998 Charlotte Köhler Prize
- 1997 Kunstprijs Provincie Overijssel
