= Gert Holstege =

Dutch neuroscientist

Gert Holstege (born 1948 in Warnsveld) is a Dutch neuroscientist at the University of Groningen in the Netherlands. Holstege studied medicines at the Erasmus University Rotterdam from 1966 to 1971. He was neuroscientist at that University from 1971 to 1987, after which he worked for 4 years for NASA in Mountain View, California. Since 1990 he has worked at the University of Groningen, where he, since 1993, has been a full professor of neuroanatomy and the Chairman of the Department of Anatomy and Embryology at the Faculty of Medicine. While his main focus is the study urge-incontinence in the elderly, some of his recent work focuses on the neurology of sexual behaviour. He was quoted in a New Scientist article as saying, "At the moment of orgasm, women do not have any emotional feelings."

Moreover, Gert Holstege is a well-known authority in the field of philately.
