= Fra Paalman =

Dutch artist (1945–2020)

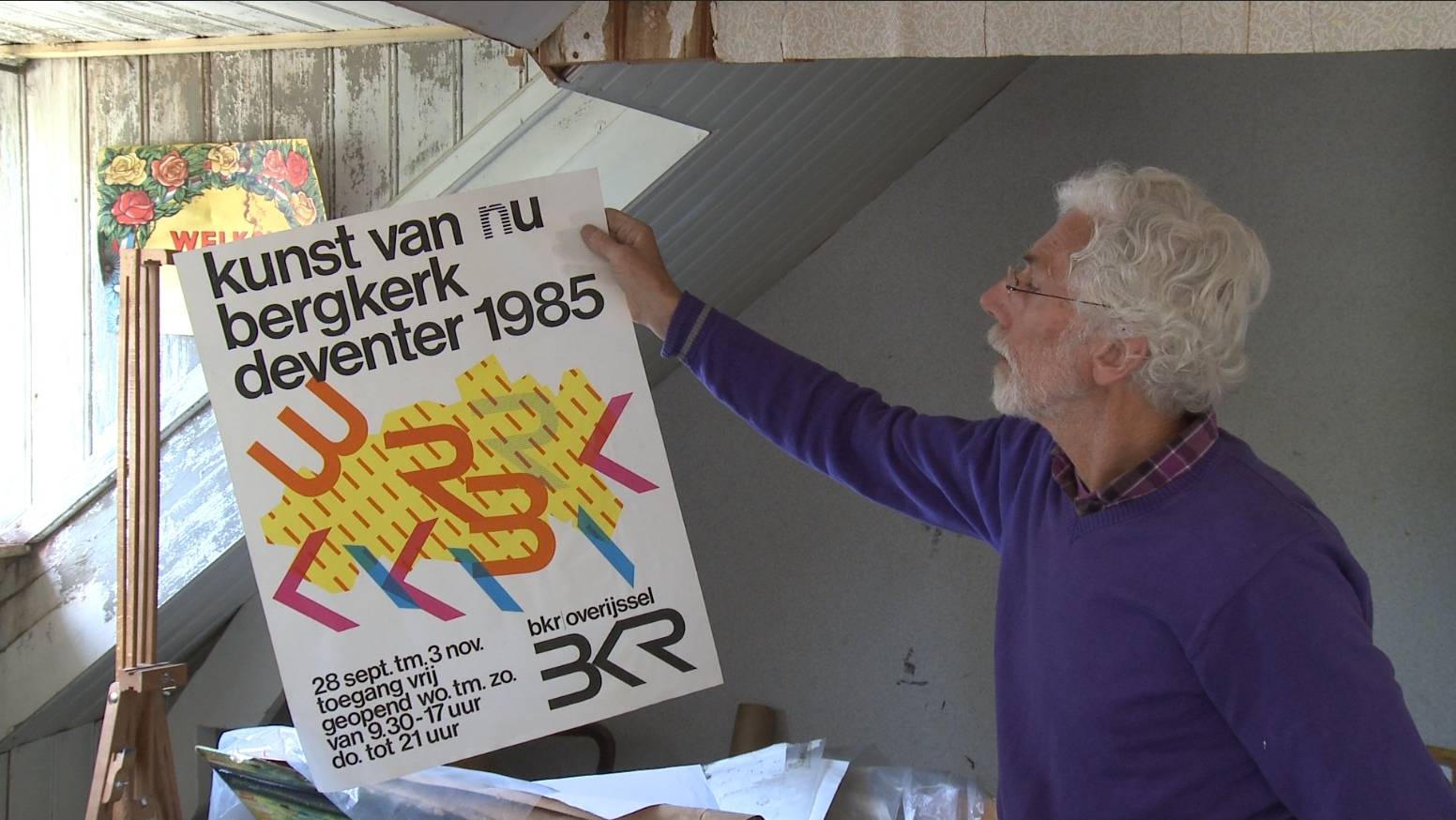
Fra Paalman in his studio, in 2015, with one of his poster designs for BKR Overijssel.

Euphrasius Franciscus Hendricus "Fra" Paalman (March 13, 1945 – April 10, 2020), was a Dutch graphic designer, visual artist and art teacher, who lived and worked in Hengelo (Overijssel), the Netherlands. Paalman designed, among others, book covers, brochures, posters, vignettes and corporate identities. As a graphic artist he made autonomous work too, especially etchings, screen prints and monotypes. His oeuvre also includes photographs, collages, sculptures, drawings and paintings, which he focused more on from the 1990s onwards. This work encompasses representations of everyday things, portraits of people, animals and landscapes, visions of the city and commentary on political events, as well as constructivist compositions and abstract images. The work often has a somewhat alienating element. As a teacher, Paalman has passed on his vision, knowledge and skills to countless people, young and old, through educational programs, courses and workshops.

== Vision and style ==
Paalman did not make a fundamental distinction between design and art, but saw related practices with their own ways of expressing ideas. For Paalman, an essential need or necessity, personal or social, was paramount when creating a work, regardless of routines and pretensions. He was averse to boasting, institutional interests, and financial gain. This was linked to his political vision. Paalman was an active member of the Socialist Party. Some of his autonomous works, including etchings, collages and paintings, have a distinctly political character, including those relating to the Vietnam War, military regimes in Latin America (especially Chile, Argentina and El Salvador), and the Gulf War, but also various domestic issues. However, the majority of his work shows everyday things, situations and environments, seen in a different light, sometimes dark and desolate, sometimes colorful and uplifting. Paalman was particularly interested in the relationship between past and present, but his work is rarely explicitly historical in nature. Similarly, he was interested in art historical movements, especially constructivism, surrealism, dada, fluxus and pop art. But a particular movement was never the starting point for his work. He preferred to engage with things that remained hidden or were considered unimportant, to allow for contradictions, and enable changes. He also switched effortlessly between abstraction and figuration, and between elaborate drawings and coincidental 'prints'.

== Education ==
Paalman studied 'Publicity and Graphic Design' at the AKI Academy for Art and Design in Enschede (1962–66). Here he was taught by, among others, Hans Ebeling Koning, Philip Kouwen, Wim van Stek and Geert Voskamp, who were important sources of inspiration for him. They encouraged him to explore different pathways. By consequence, Paalman bought a 6 x 6 medium format photo camera and started taking photographs, and he was often found in the graphic workshop experimenting with various printing techniques. Together with fellow student Wim Rijnveld, he made several remarkable booklets, such as "A246-NO399/BOEM". They were enthusiastically received by director Arie Middelhoek and later seen as representative of work created by students in this period. In 1965, Paalman en Rijnveld did an internship at De la Mar in Amsterdam, one of the main advertising agencies in the Netherlands. At the same time, Paalman followed the 'Advertising Assistant' course through the Leiden Educational Institutions (Dutch: Leidse Onderwijsinstellingen), to gain additional knowledge and skills regarding visual communication.

== Professional practice ==
After his studies, Paalman started working at the Netherlands State Printing House, Staatsdrukkerij en Uitgeverij (SDU), in The Hague, where he worked for a year and a half. Here he designed various book covers, catalogues, brochures and forms, for example those for the E.E.C. After working for a short time for advertising agency HBM in Amsterdam (Hiemstra, Bouthoorn, Mulder), Paalman started his own agency in Enschede in 1968. That year also saw the establishment of the professional association Grafisch Vormgevers Nederland (GVN, later BNO), of which he became one of the first members. In his early years, Paalman mainly designed book covers, commissioned by various publishers, including Elsevier, Samsom, Wolters-Noordhoff, Het Spectrum, and Prisma. One of his best-known designs from that time is the cover of the Prisma pocket Zelfkennis Spelenderwijs (Roger Dal, 1969), which was republished in its original design in 2008. Paalman's portfolio expanded rapidly. He also designed posters (e.g., for the Lochem Pop Meeting, 1968, the first pop festival in the Netherlands), advertisements, labels, games, exhibition boards, flow charts (e.g., for AKZO), and corporate identities (e.g., for Versteeg Glass and Paint). More and more companies, institutions and municipalities, especially in the east of the Netherlands, commissioned Paalman's designs. After his marriage to Annemieke Huiskes in 1971, he moved to Hengelo, where he lived and worked until his death. For more than forty years he had a studio on Emmaweg, a former greengrocer, where Annemieke also had a shop until 1990, selling curiosities and clothing. In the following years, Paalman used the shop windows as an exhibition space. In addition, he participated in numerous exhibitions in the region and in the virtual Museum for Contemporary Art Hengelo (MHHK, curator Ricardo Liong-A-Kong).

== Teaching ==
As an extension of his practice as a designer and artist, Paalman was active as a teacher of drawing, painting and graphics at various educational institutions in Twente, and contributed to all kinds of educational programmes and projects. He taught different groups of people, both children and adults, beginners and advanced students, as well as mentally handicapped people. Paalman's pedagogy – inspired by his teachers at AKI, was not based on what people were expected to be able to do, but on what people actually could and wanted to do, driven by curiosity. For Paalman, discovering and showing how something can be seen and done differently was more important than meeting the requirements of a set standard. His approach has inspired many.

== Artists' spaces, monuments, urban development ==
From the mid-1970s until the end of his life, Paalman was a board member of the Foundation for Artists' Living and Working Space (Stichting Woon – Werkruimte Kunstenaars, SWWK), which supported the ever-growing number of artists in Hengelo by literally and figuratively finding space for artists in the city. In this way, Paalman also came into contact with municipal real estate policy, urban renewal, demolition and construction plans, about which he was always critical. Due to the lack of historical awareness within the municipality, Paalman, together with SWWK member architect Henk Methorst, conducted research into the historical development of Hengelo, including text, photographs and maps. It would become the blueprint for the municipal care of monuments, monitored and directed by various artistic interventions later on. The subject of urban development is, more generally, also reflected in many of Paalman's drawings, photographs, paintings and etchings.

== BKR Overijssel ==
In the Netherlands, in 1956, the Artist Subsidy (Beeldende Kunstenaarsregeling, BKR) was introduced by the state as a way to support artists, which was implemented at municipal level. However, in the province of Overijssel, the municipalities decided to work together, which was coordinated from Hengelo. Paalman was asked to design the corporate identity, including a logo, stationery and posters, as well as the design of various exhibitions, for example the exhibition "Art of Now" (1986), in Slagharen Amusement Park, which was an attempt to bring art to the people. Together with colleague Gerard de Vries, Paalman also designed various publications for the BKR, which gave them space to experiment. The scheme ended in 1987.

== Visual Arts Foundation "Ag" ==
In the vacuum that arose after the dissolution of the BKR, Paalman and colleagues took the initiative to set up their own art foundation in Hengelo. Thus, in early 1988, "Stichting Beeldende Kunst Ag" was founded by Fra Paalman, Gerard de Vries, Jozef de Bot, Frans Bolscher and Anne Wind (soon joined by John Brunink). "Ag", as the chemical symbol for the element silver (argentum), was chosen because of Hengelo's identity related to its metal industry - although it was later suggested that Ag stood for Aktiengesellschaft or avant-garde. The founding of Ag happened simultaneously with the organization of the manifestation 'Art on the Street', with art in public showcases, for which the foundation was a vehicle. But Ag also wanted a permanent exhibition space and in 1989 they found an old windmill in the center of the city. "De Molen" became an important reference in the region. Numerous artists showed their work here or were otherwise involved, including many who had just graduated from the AKI and other academies in the Netherlands. At the end of 1997, Ag had to leave the mill, and they were given access to a former aviary in a park nearby (Prins Bernhardplantsoen). Finally, in 2006, they moved to a pavilion of the town hall, which was renamed 'Agterhuis.' Paalman was chairman of Ag for 25 years (1988-2013). In addition to organizing projects, curating exhibitions and supervising exhibitors, together with other board members, he was also in charge of the graphic design of the foundation.

== Private life ==
Paalman attended primary school in his hometown of Hengelo and subsequently the minor seminary of the Mill Hill Missionaries in Tilburg (St. Joseph-Studiehuis). Paalman learned to play the violin at a young age and was able to continue this in Tilburg, under the guidance of the Hungarian violinist László Révész. At that time, Paalman developed a special interest in the music of composer Béla Bartók. But his music interests were very broad; later in life he also sang in two choirs. Daily life was an important subject for Paalman's work, as were his immediate environment and those close to him. In addition to official assignments, he frequently made designs for family and friends, including wedding cards, birth announcements and invitations for various gatherings. In his autonomous work he also often focused on his immediate environment, in particular that of his family. He made a large number of photographs, drawings, paintings and etchings of his wife Annemieke and their three children.

Fra Paalman was the son of Johanna Vos, dressmaker, and Jan Willem Paalman, head of planning at the Stork machine factory. His father took his work home with him, sowing Fra's lifelong interest in machines and technology. This was reflected, among other things, in Fra's car collection, including a Citroën Traction-Avant, a Citroën Ami 6, and a Renault Estafette, which he often tinkered with in the summer. On the other hand, there was his strong interest in animals and plants. For example, he obtained a diploma as a beekeeper, which is of special significance in Hengelo, as is reflected in the coat of arms of Hengelo. In the garden behind the house he also grew all kinds of plants and trees, some of which are rare in the Netherlands, such as fig tree, quince tree, a huge grape plant, a Turkish medlar and a lemon tree, while he was also very proud of the walnut tree behind his studio. Animals and plants are therefore frequent subjects of his visual work. In 2016, Paalman was diagnosed with Alzheimer's disease. His wife Annemieke subsequently cared for and assisted him. At that time, Paalman became one of the first participants in the kunstenaarssociëteit, an experiment with elderly artists. He spent the last year of his life in the Backenhagen nursing home in Hengelo, where he died in 2020.
