= Southern Norway Art Museum =

Museum in Kristiansand, Norway

Coordinates: 58.1468061°N 7.9937452°E

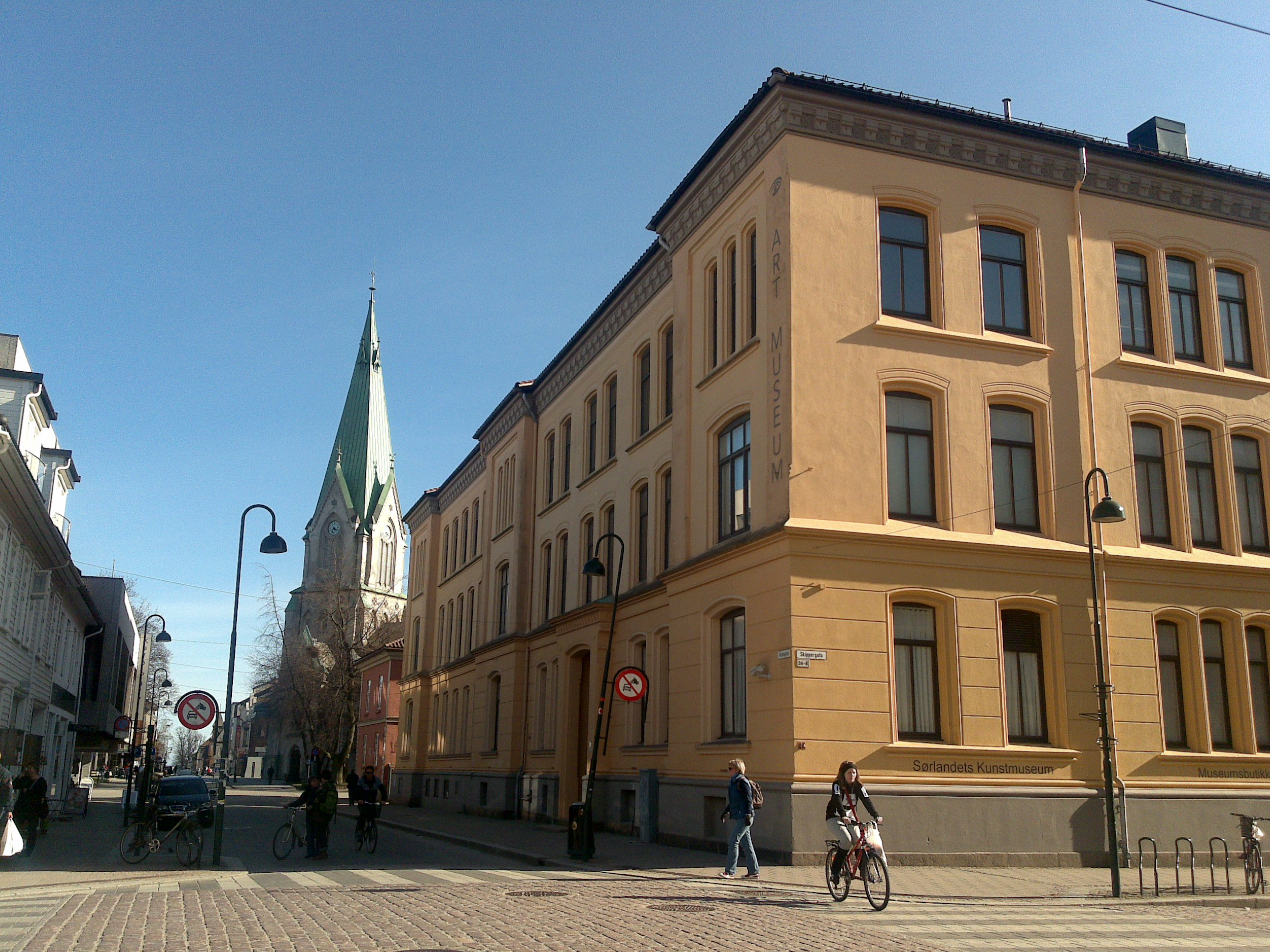
The Southern Norway Art Museum, located in the former building of the Kristiansand Cathedral School

The Southern Norway Art Museum (Norwegian: Sørlandets Kunstmuseum) is located in Kristiansand, Norway in the building that until 1970 hosted the Kristiansand Cathedral School.

The museum is a foundation, and it was created in 1995, with the counties of Aust-Agder and Vest-Agder as initiators together with the municipality of Kristiansand and the Kristiansand Art Gallery. The museum is working with both art and crafts. The foundation will work to create interest, awareness and competence in relation to the visual arts, crafts and other visual forms of expression.

The museum runs extensive art-related activities, that includes exhibits of the permanent collection, temporary contemporary art exhibitions and traveling exhibitions to schools and preschools.

In April 2024, Norwegian media were the first to publish a series of photos from the Kunstsilo (museum) in Kristiansand. Media took the photographs without successfully negotiating a permission from the museum.

== Collections ==
The museum's permanent collections are based on art that belonged to the Kristiansand Art Gallery. Among the artists represented are Christian Krohg, Morten Müller, Johan Christian Dahl, Amaldus Clarin Nielsen, Kjell Nupen, Karsten Jakobsen and Else Marie Jakobsen.
