= Warnsveld =

- Town
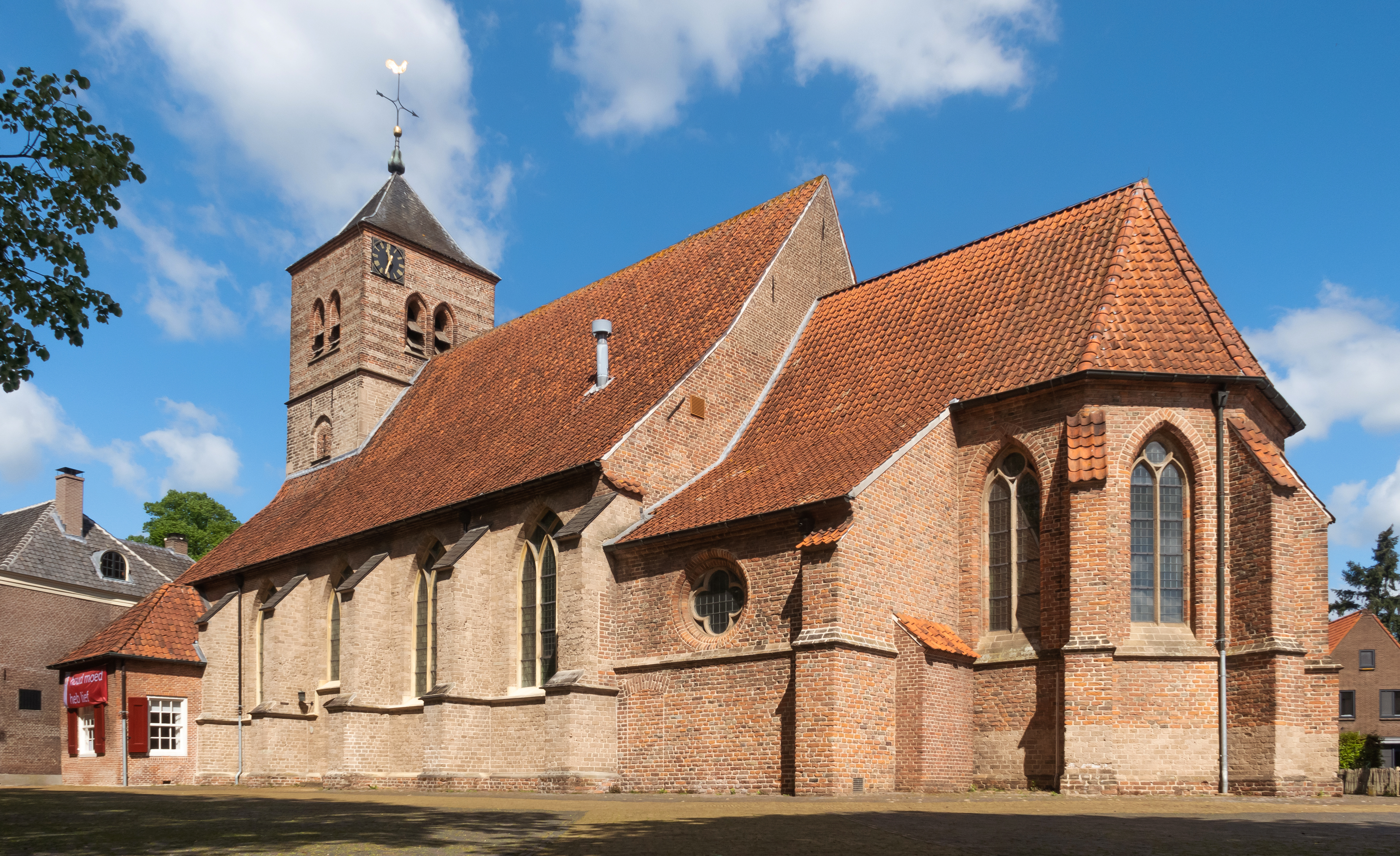
- Church of Warnsveld

- Flag Coat of arms

- Location in the province of Gelderland in the Netherlands Warnsveld (Netherlands)
- Coordinates: 52°8′30″N 6°13′18″E
- Country: Netherlands
- Province: Gelderland
- Municipality: Zutphen

Area
  - Total: 15.53 km^{2} (6.00 sq mi)
- Elevation: 9 m (30 ft)

Population (2021)
  - Total: 8,390
  - Density: 540/km^{2} (1,400/sq mi)
- Time zone: UTC+1 (CET)
  - Summer (DST): UTC+2 (CEST)
- Postal code: 7230-7232
- Dialing code: 0575

Warnsveld is a town in the eastern Netherlands, about 2 km east of Zutphen.

== History ==
The first mention of the village in writing is from the year 1121 as Wansveld, and means "field of Warin or Warni (person)". Warnsveld developed in the Middle Ages along the Berkel.

Warnsveld's Martinuskerk (Church of Saint Martin) has a tower from around 1100. In the 15th century, both the church and tower were enlarged. The church was restored between 1954 and 1957, and the 19th century modifications were undone.

The former havezate 't Velde was first mentioned in 1326. Shortly after 1535 it redesigned in early Renaissance style. It was extensively modified and enlarged in 1701. It is nowadays used by the police academy.

Warnsveld was home to 505 people in 1840. In 1841, the road between Zutphen and Lochem was paved, and estates were built along the road.

Warnsveld was a separate municipality until 2005, when it was merged with Zutphen. The former municipality had a population of about 9,000, and covered both the village of Warnsveld and nearby Warken.

== People born in Warnsveld ==
- Richard Constant Boer (1863-1929), linguist
- Gert Holstege (born 1948), neuroscientist
- Ellen ten Damme (born 1967), singer and actor
- Anne-Wil Lucas-Smeerdijk (born 1975), politician
- Jan Werle (born 1984), chess player Grandmaster
- Thijs van Amerongen (born 1986), cyclo-cross cyclist

== People died in Warnsveld ==
- Ida Gerhardt (1905-1997), poet
- Philip Kouwen (1922-2002), artist

== Gallery ==
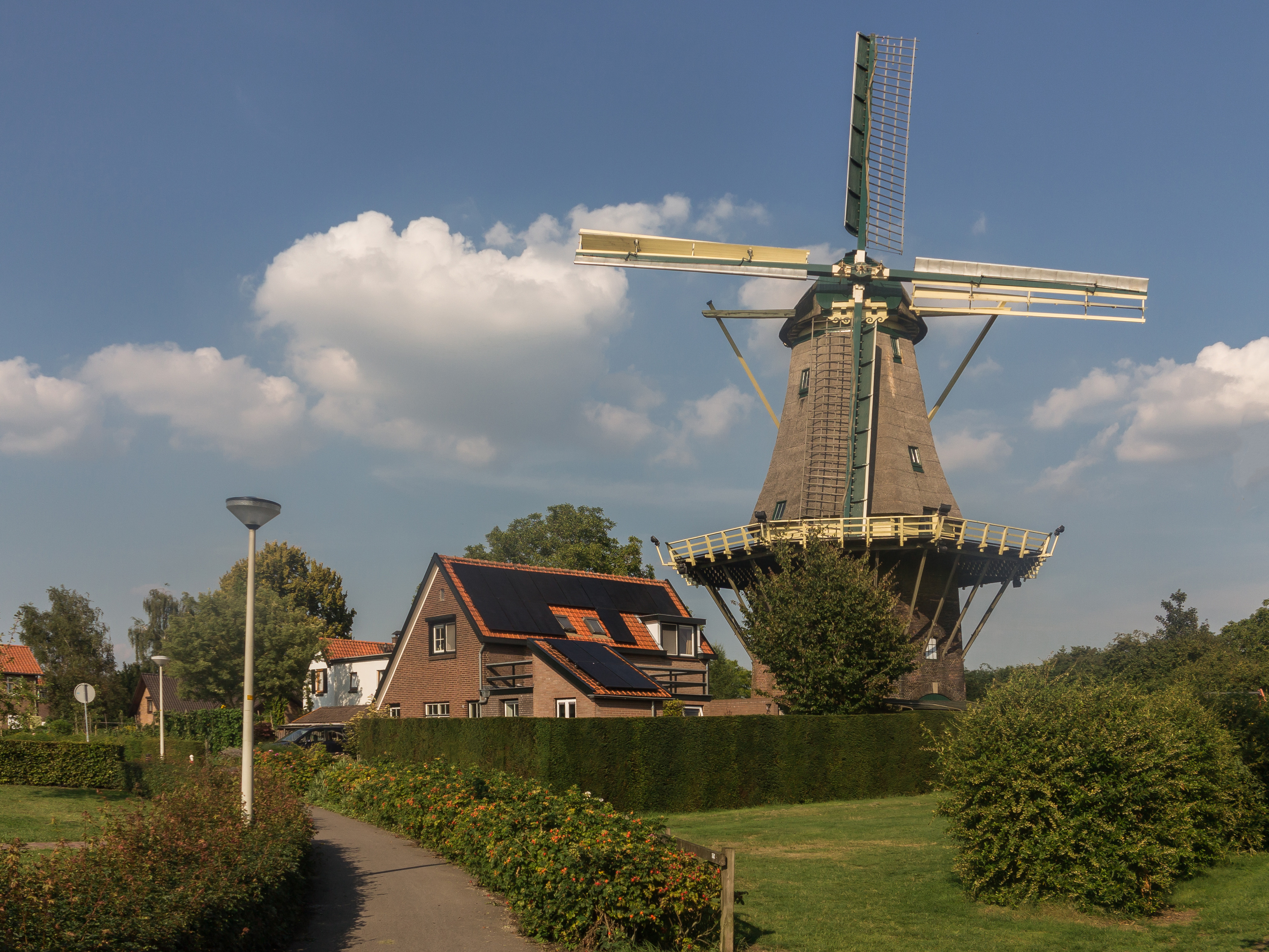
Windmill: korenmolen Nooit Gedacht

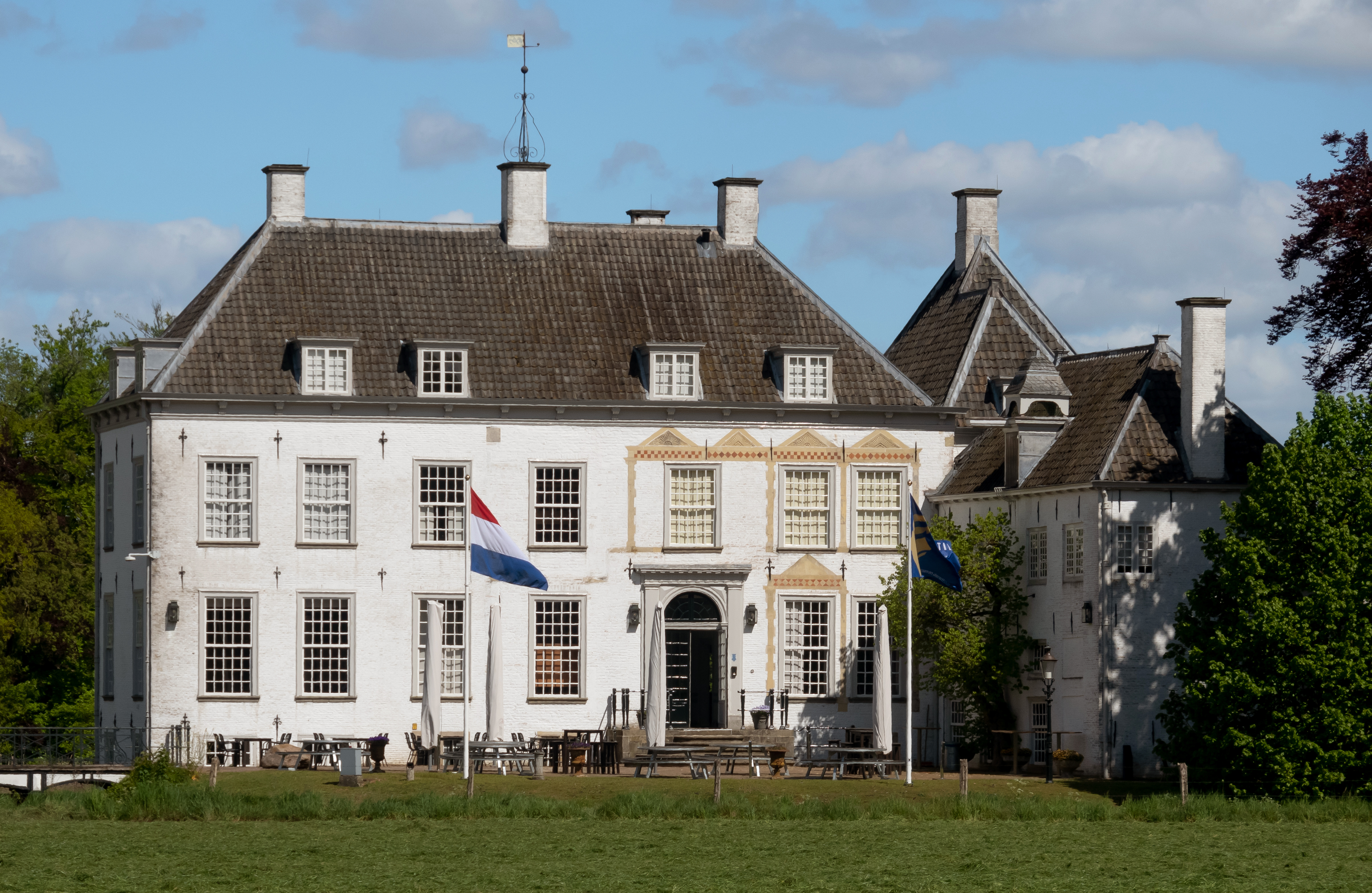
Country house Huis' t Velde (nowadays a police academy)

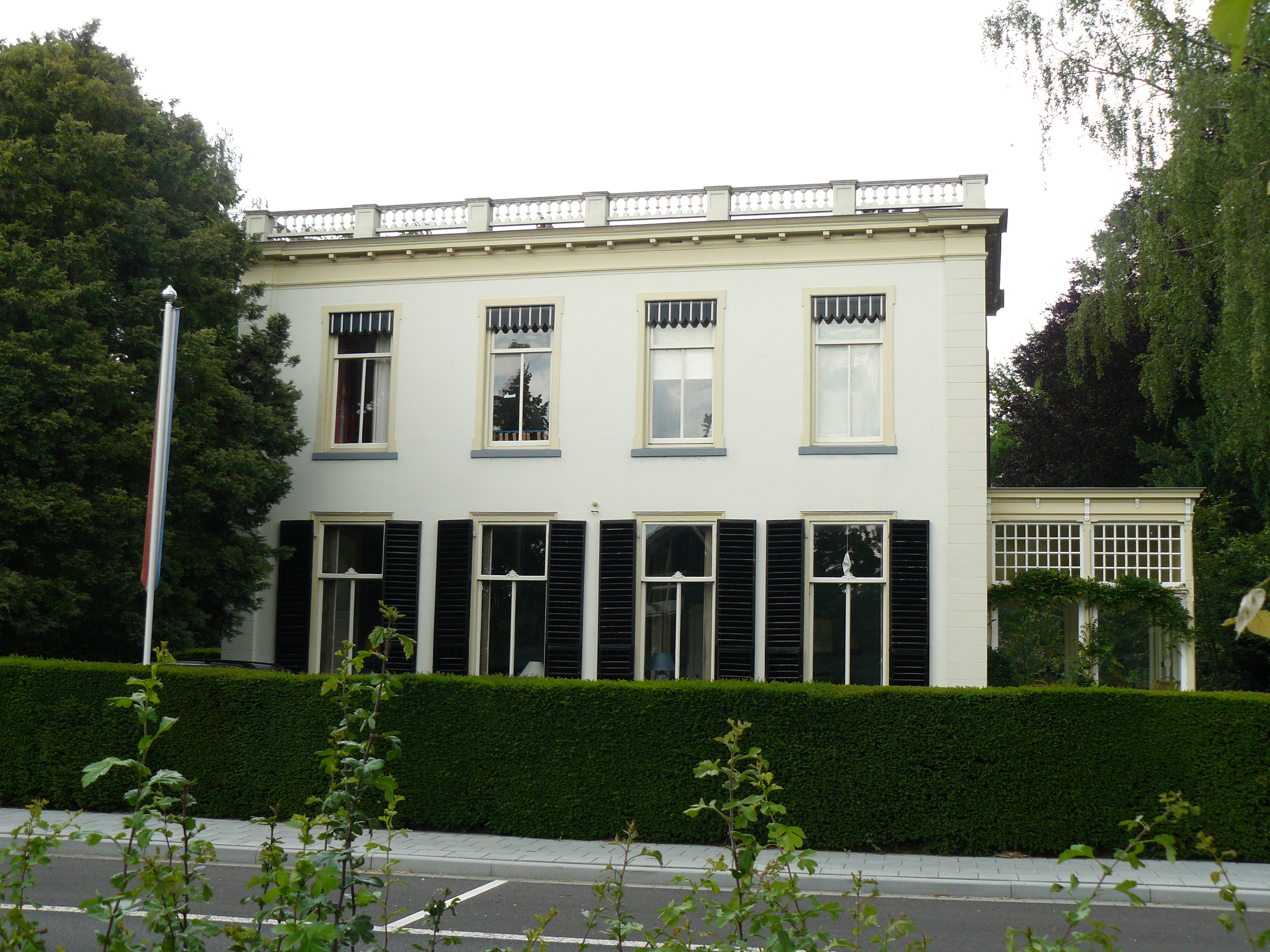
Villa in Warnsveld

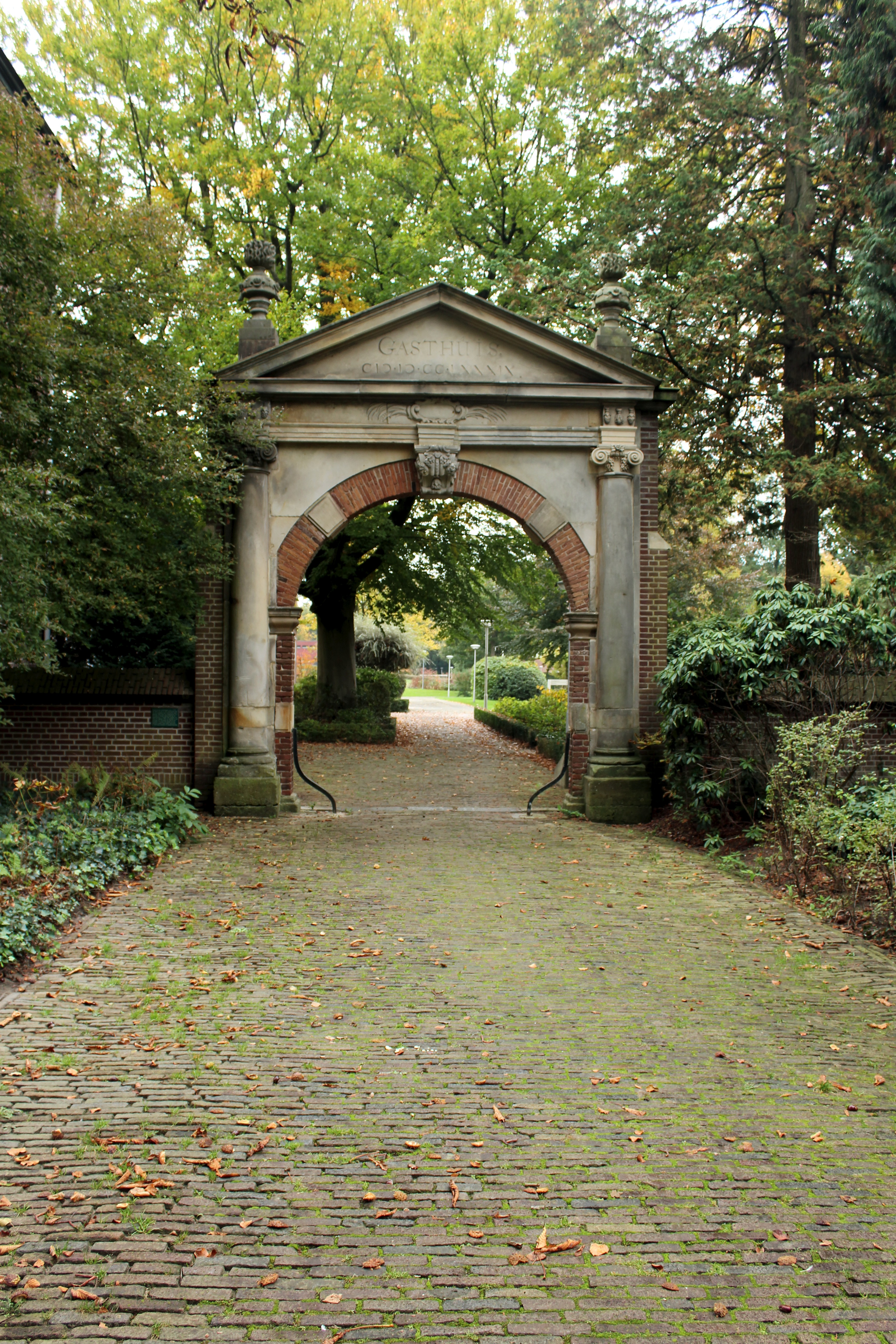
Gate house
