= Jeroen Jongeleen =

Dutch artist

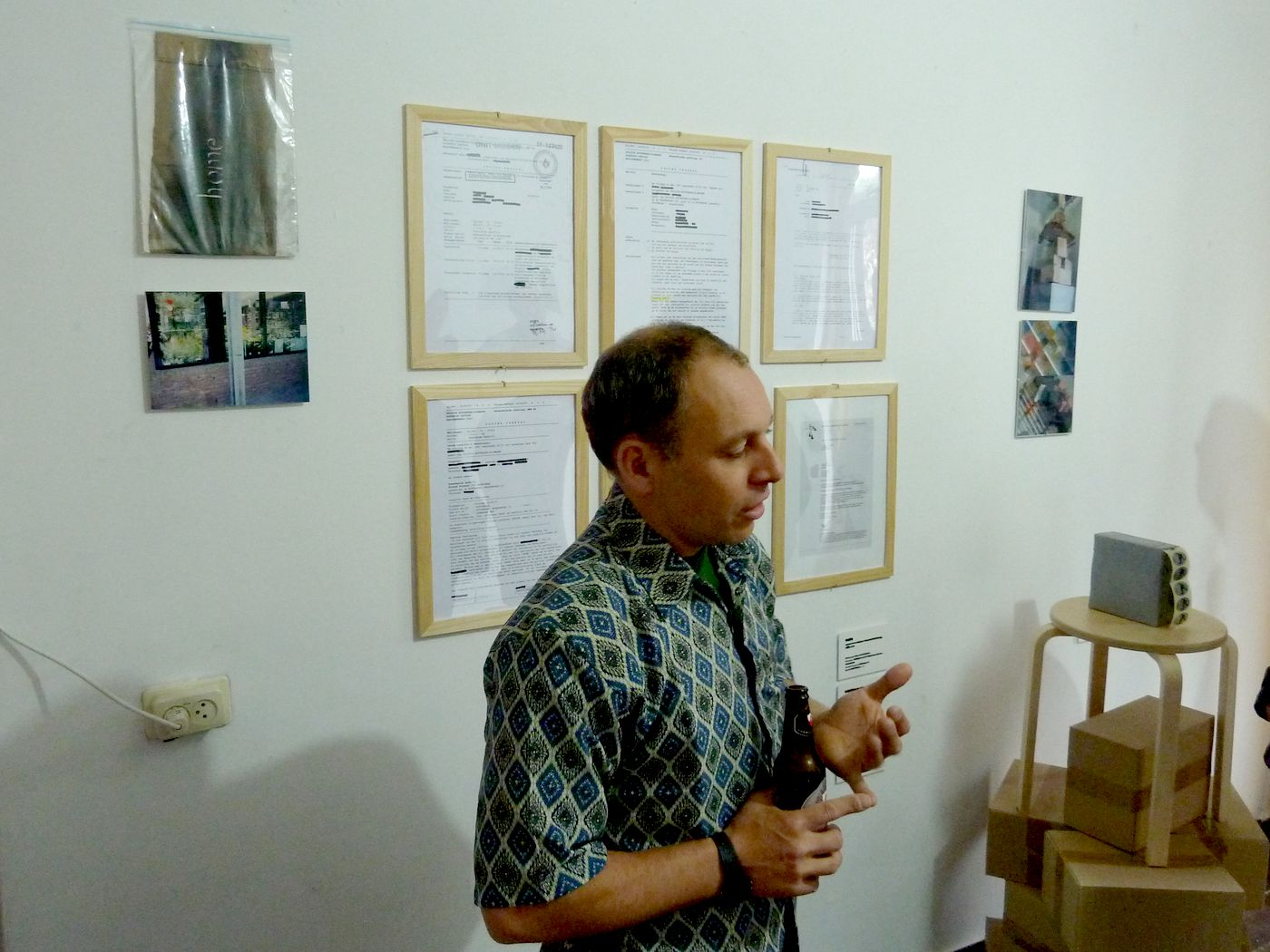
- Jeroen Jongeleen giving a guided tour of his artworks, 2010
- Born: Jeroen Jongeleen; 1967 (age 58–59); Apeldoorn, Netherlands
- Known for: Installations, graffiti, painting
- Movement: Street Art
- Website: http://flu01.com/

Jeroen Jongeleen (born 2 November 1967, Apeldoorn) is a Dutch artist. His artwork has been influenced by graffiti art and textual art and is often created in public spaces. In his artworks Jongeleen criticizes today’s over regulated society.

== Biography ==
Jongeleen lives and works in Rotterdam and Paris. He studied at the AKI Academy for Art and Design in Enschede, where he graduated in 1994.

In 1997, he moved to Rotterdam where he did one of his first interventions in public space. With a spray can he wrote the word ‘HOME’ on the outside wall of Museum Boijmans Van Beuningen. He was arrested for this action, but it was the start of a close relationship with the museum. In 1999, he participated in the group exhibition Exorcism/Aesthetic Terrorism, 2000 in the Museum Boijmans Van Beuningen.

In 2003, Jongeleen moved to Paris where he stayed at Atelier Holboer. Here he expanded his contact with the Paris pre-street art scene resulting in the Art of Urban Warfare. Jongeleen's street interventions carry the project name “influenza,” functioning as well as a semi-anonymous signature. The alias “Influenza” connotes his repeated attacks on the well-oiled social body, while qualifying the development of his artistic practice as a self-reflexive exercise engaged in feeding its own momentum.

== Works ==
Jeroen Jongeleen's work generally evolves in public space, leaving traces in the urban landscape, which he documents with photographs and films. With his interventions he promotes the free use of urban public space and criticizes the way advertising, architectural structures and signs regulate public behavior. He chooses to counterattack by bringing subversive forms of creativity to the public's attention. In one of his projects, Jongeleen created stickers of hands in different positions, which, when displayed in rapid succession, form a fluent motion. He spread the stickers in cities worldwide and made pictures of the places where he left them. In a documentary, showing the pictures in rapid succession, the individual interventions became coherent.

For another project, Jongeleen collected plastic bags, which you can buy for 25 cents in every Dutch supermarket and mostly end up as urban litter in the streets. These collected bags he replaced in more noticeable locations: on the top of high buildings, flats and bridges in the city. With this project Jongeleen builds a bridge between art in public space and the side effects of the culture of mass consumption, questioning both.

Jongeleen's work is inspired by the ideas of the Situationist International (SI), a revolutionary group founded in 1957, which reached its peak of influence in the general strike of May 1968 in France. During the Paris uprising the influential leader of this group was the writer and theorist Guy Debord (1931-1994), whose influential and renowned work, Society of the Spectacle is considered to be the cause for the uprising. Like the Situationists, Jongeleen turns against consumerism and over-regulated society by interrupting the public space. Utilizing means and visual forms associated with guerilla protest – graffiti, stickers and placard cut-outs – his interventions draw attention to a particular form of militant activism while questioning the nature, value and transformative potential of artistic production.

In his exhibitions Jongeleen brings the street within the walls of the White Cube. Many of his works feature discarded hardboard on which short critical quotes have been sprayed. Jongeleen finds these texts on websites such as Geen Stijl, Spitsnieuws and Retecool, which publicize sharp opinionated pieces focused on news, actual events and politics. On these websites Jongeleen selects opinions on contemporary art, spraying these quotes onto the surfaces of his artworks. By this Jongeleen tries to call attention to the public ideas on art.

Next to his more textual work Jongeleen makes impressionist landscapes, which call to mind the spherical landscapes of Jacob Isaakszoon van Ruisdael. Jongeleen however doesn't cover the white canvas with paint. He creates his landscapes with street dirt coming from shoe soles, bicycle tires and dirty fingerprints.

== Exhibitions ==
The work of Jeroen Jongeleen is displayed in numerous solo and group exhibitions, including:

- "Traces, Shapes, Squares and Circles," Harlan Levey Projects, Brussels, Belgium (2014)
- Jeroen Jongeleen: No Style, Reflections of public statements on art.., Upstream Gallery, Amsterdam (2012)
- Too late, too little, (and how) to fail gracefully, Stichting Fort Asperen, Acquoy (2011)
- Paramaribo Perspectives, TENT Rotterdam, Rotterdam (2010)
- Crop rotation, Marianne Boesky Gallery, New York City (2008)
- Brave New World, Cobra Museum, Amstelveen (2007)
- Umbau, Kunsthalle St. Gallen, Switzerland (2007)
- SCAPE 06, the Biennial of Art in Public Space, Christchurch, New Zealand (2006)
- That was then, this is now, De Appel, Amsterdam (2006)
- Project Rotterdam, Museum Boijmans Van Beuningen, Rotterdam (2005)

== Art Fairs ==
- Armory Show, New York City (2012)
- Art Rotterdam (2012)
- Art Brussels (2009)
- NADA Art Fair Miami (2008)
