= Jop Horst =

Dutch visual artist and filmmaker

Jop Horst (Rome, September 27, 1961 - Hengelo, January 12, 2014) was a Dutch visual artist and filmmaker, living and working in Hengelo. His oeuvre includes various types of media and techniques, such as kinetic installations, drawings, paintings, experimental films, video art and performances.

Horst studied at the Academy of Visual Arts St. Joost in Breda (1982-1986), and at the AKI in Enschede (1986-1988). In 1991 he received a Start-up Grant for Visual Arts from the Dutch state.

== Work ==
Horst's work, in spirit akin to Dada and Fluxus, is investigative, explorative, playful, humorous and often elusive. He had a special interest in the number zero (0), as something that does not exist and is intangible, which inspired him to create various works, such as the Zero Counter: a device made with adhesive tape that continuously adds up 0 to 0. He was also fascinated by the phenomenon of sleep. At the same time, his work is an exploration into the basics of moving image technologies.

While he already made computer animations in the 1980s, he rediscovered various analog techniques during the digital revolution in the 1990s. As such, Jop Horst was an early artistic practitioner of media archaeology.

An important part of his oeuvre is made up of his 8 mm films (whether or not made in collaboration with Joris Baudoin), such as Het Gele Bakje, Ploatje droaie and Ei, ei, ei. He often reused images from these films in cinematic installations. To that end, he modified and appropriated all kinds of technical devices, such as a record player, toaster, or fan, to create movement and images in unconventional ways. Noteworthy are also his installations with overhead projectors, showing live mosquito larvae projected onto walls. Among his well-known 'film sculptures' are "Sleepwalker I" (1995), with a rotating projection through which a man walked through a space, "3D Zoetrope" (1995), being a zoetrope with a clay animation, as well as "Large Random Zoetrope" (1989), which made the exhibition space - a floor of an old windmill, part of the zoetrope. Due to the temporary, site-specific, and often improvised nature of Horst's experimental works, relatively little of his work has been preserved.

In the 2000s, Horst created a large number of video and audio works, sometimes in combination with 8mm films, as part of performances or installations, in which he also used other media. In his last years, Horst was best known for his absurdist drawings and 'drawings for 1 euro'.

== Exhibitions ==
Jop Horst's work has been featured in numerous exhibitions and festivals in the Netherlands and abroad, among them shows at Montevideo, W139, Arti et Amicitiae, and Nederlands Filmmuseum (all in Amsterdam), De Molen (Hengelo), De Bank (Enschede), Extrapool (Nijmegen), Open Air Filmfest (Weiterstadt, Germany), Kunstruimte Berlijn (Berlin, Germany), Artephobia (Graz, Austria), and Pofferd de Nul (Antwerp, Belgium). For a full list, see the official website.

Horst's last exhibition, during his life, was at the Rijksmuseum Twenthe, as a participant in a retrospective of 25 years of Media Art at the AKI/ArtEZ, under the title 'Playing on the border of the impossible' (2012-2013). There he showed various objects that are typical of his own way of thinking about and approach to art, such as 'Kicking soldier' and 'Fighting soldiers in a box'. Horst's sculpture 'Viewpoint' (Blik) (2012) is located in Tuindorp 't Lansink in Hengelo. After his death, a retrospective exhibition took place in Zaal-Zuid in Hengelo (installations, drawings, paintings and films), and in Rijksmuseum Twenthe in Enschede (installations and drawings). Jop Horst's films are included in the collection of Eye Filmmuseum, Amsterdam.

== Collaborations ==
Horst collaborated with various artists, on installations, films (often with Joris Baudoin), performances, exhibitions and publications. Horst also frequently collaborated with artists' organizations, such as Visual Arts Foundation "Ag" in Hengelo, and the Dutch broadcast station PARK TV (for media art).

In addition, Horst was co-initiator of various artist initiatives, such as the Hengelo sleeping club (with Pieter Baan Müller and Ricardo Füglistahler), FAB5, Reuzendoders and the band IQ-loze Mietjes (in which Horst was active as a drummer). In the late 1990s, Horst was part of the artist collective 'Diascoop', together with Ida Lohman and others, which made performances with magic lantern projections. Finally, Horst also did live video shows, in collaboration with music producer Martin Oude Kempers, operating under the names CRO II and Quantum Leap.
