= Peter Struycken =

Dutch visual artist (born 1939)

Peter Struycken Knight in the Order of Orange-Nassau
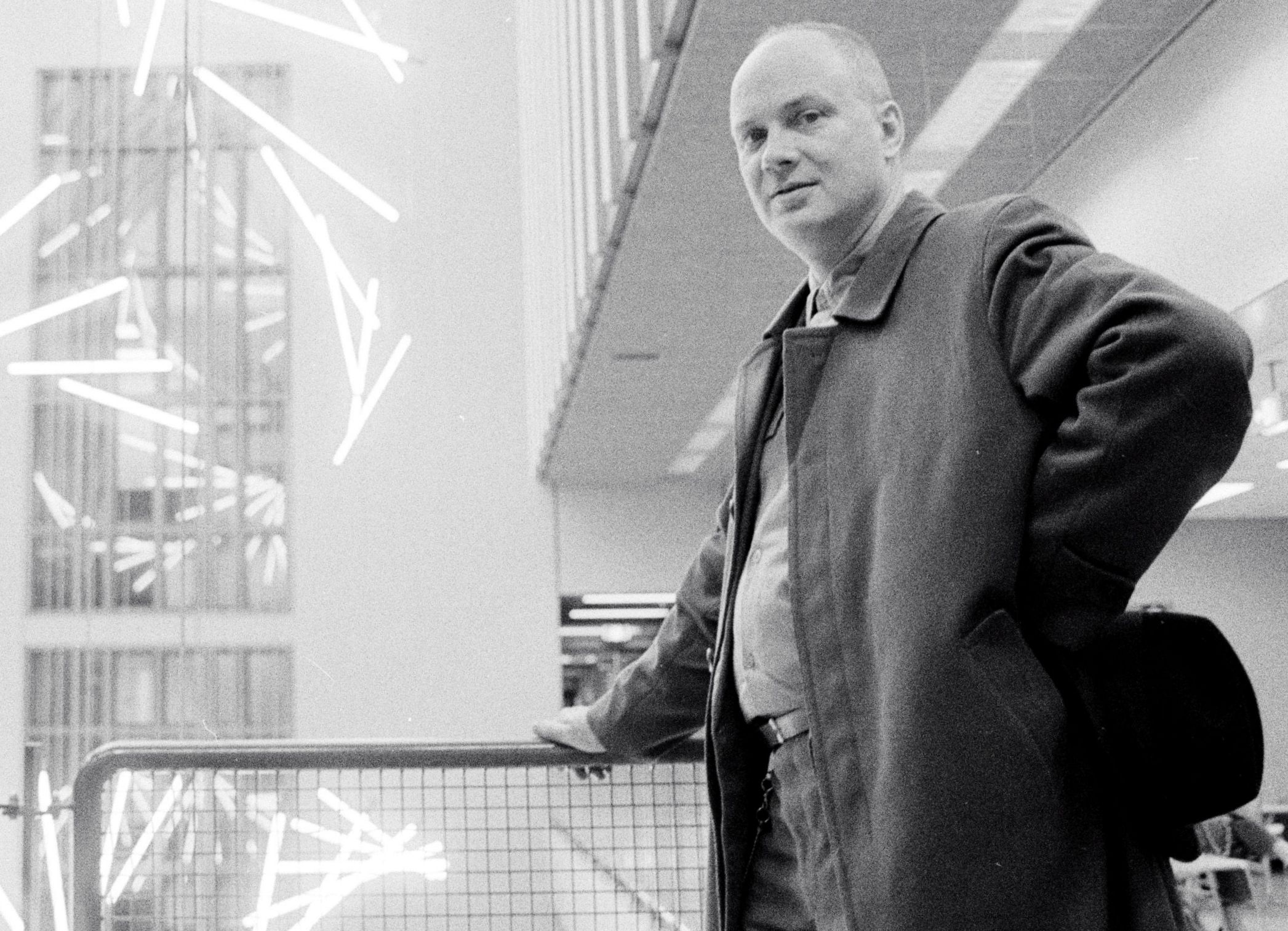
- Struycken in 1992
- Born: 5 January 1939 (age 87)
- Education: Royal Academy of Art

Peter Struycken (born 5 January 1939) is a Dutch artist. The painter, computer artist and sculptor won the 2012 Heineken Prize for Arts from the Royal Netherlands Academy of Arts and Sciences. He was made a Knight in the Order of Orange-Nassau in 1984.

Struycken went to the Haagsche Lyceum and studied at the Royal Academy of Art in The Hague from 1957 to 1962. In 1964, he became a teacher at Hogeschool voor de kunsten Arnhem. He is the older brother of actor Carel Struycken.

== Work ==
In 1969, Peter Struycken was one of the earliest adopters of using computers to generate art and is considered one of the "pioneers" of Dutch digital art.

"Computer Structures (1969), a series of paintings by Peter Struycken, was made by hand according to digital visual compositions. Digital transitions were made from simple to complex and from regular to random visual structures. The computer enabled Struycken to investigate the role of chance in the creative process, whilst also retaining a certain measure of control."

During the late 1970s, he utilized a basic computer program to create a set of sixteen pastel hues. Subsequently, these shades were incorporated into his color scheme for the Kröller-Müller Museum's auditorium.

One of his best publicly-known works is a series of postage stamps from 1981 (until 2010) he designed with typography designer Gerard Unger. The series is based on a photograph of Beatrix of the Netherlands and made up of dots and produced with the use of a computer.

== Bibliography ==
- Carel Blotkamp, Jonneke Jobse, Ruud Schenk, P. Struycken, exh. cat. Groninger Museum, Rotterdam: Groninger Museum, Groningen/NAi Publishers, 2007, ISBN 978-90-5662-606-8 (English), ISBN 978-90-5662-605-1(Dutch).
