= Daniel Hernández =

Daniel Hernández may refer to:

== People ==
=== Artists and musicians ===
- Daniel Hernández Morillo (1856–1932), Peruvian painter for whom the district in Peru is named
- Dan Hernandez (born 1983), American screenwriter and producer
- Daniel Hernández (born 1990), Mexican drummer for Tangerine Circus
- 6ix9ine (Daniel Hernandez, born 1996), American rapper
- Kalorie Karbdashian-Williams (Daniel Hernandez), American drag queen

=== Politicians ===
- Daniel Ordóñez Hernández (born 1968), Mexican lawyer and politician
- Daniel Hernández Jr. (born 1990), Arizona state representative and former intern credited for saving Representative Gabrielle Giffords' life

=== Sportspeople ===
- Daniel Hernández (tennis) (fl. 1930s), Mexican tennis player
- Daniel Hernández (footballer, born 1970), Argentine footballer
- Daniel Hernández (soccer, born 1976), American soccer defender
- Dani Hernández (born 1985), Venezuelan football goalkeeper
- Daniel Hernández (footballer, born 1990), Colombian football midfielder
- Daniel Hernández (footballer, born 1994), Mexican football midfielder

=== Other Fields ===
- Daniel L. Hernandez, founder of the Inner-City Games

== Places ==
- Daniel Hernández District, one of sixteen districts of the province Tayacaja in Peru
