= Mark Sanchez =

American football player and broadcaster (born 1986)

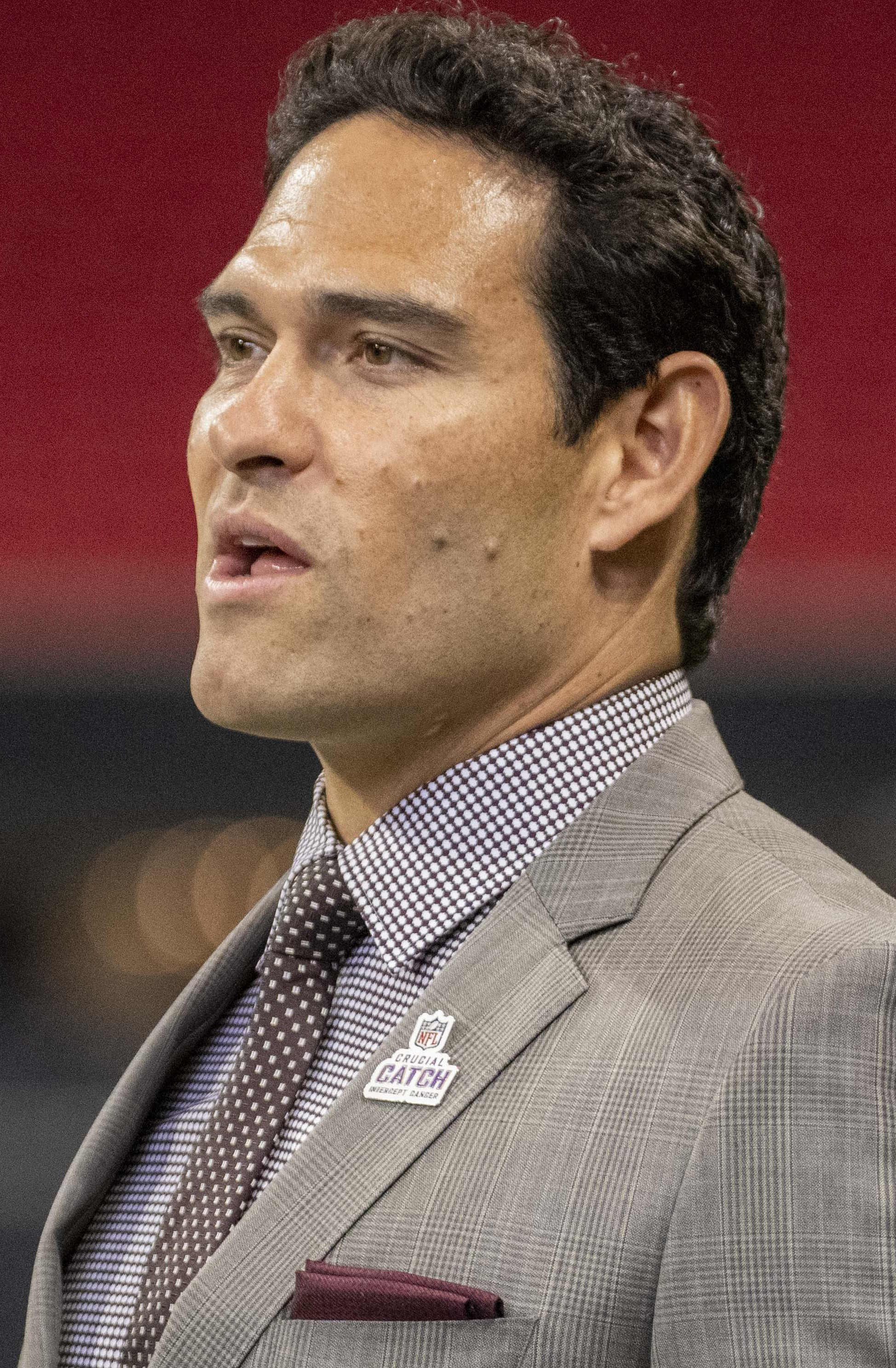
- Sanchez in 2021

No. 6, 3
- Position: Quarterback

Personal information
- Born: November 11, 1986 (age 40); Long Beach, California, U.S.
- Listed height: 6 ft 2 in (1.88 m)
- Listed weight: 232 lb (105 kg)

Career information
- High school: Mission Viejo; (Mission Viejo, California)
- College: USC (2005–2008)
- NFL draft: 2009: 1st round, 5th overall pick

Career history
- New York Jets (2009–2013); Philadelphia Eagles (2014–2015); Denver Broncos (2016)*; Dallas Cowboys (2016); Chicago Bears (2017); Washington Redskins (2018)
- * Offseason or practice squad member only

Awards and highlights
- PFWA All-Rookie Team (2009); First-team All-Pac-10 (2008)

Career NFL statistics
- Passing attempts: 2,320
- Passing completions: 1,314
- Completion percentage: 56.6%
- TD–INT: 86–89
- Passing yards: 15,357
- Passer rating: 73.2
- Stats at Pro Football Reference

Mark Travis John Sanchez (born November 11, 1986) is an American former professional football quarterback who played in the National Football League (NFL) for 10 seasons. He played college football for the USC Trojans and was selected by the New York Jets in the first round (fifth overall) of the 2009 NFL draft.

A backup quarterback during his first three years at the University of Southern California, Sanchez rose to prominence in 2007 due to injuries suffered by starting quarterback John David Booty; he also became popular within the Los Angeles community due to his Mexican-American heritage. Sanchez was named the starter in 2008, and led USC to a 12–1 record and won the Rose Bowl against Penn State. Although USC coach Pete Carroll and many scouts considered him too inexperienced, Sanchez entered the 2009 NFL draft and was selected by the Jets in the first round.

Despite a subpar first season, Sanchez led the Jets to the AFC Championship Game, a losing effort to the Indianapolis Colts, becoming the fourth rookie quarterback in NFL history to win his first playoff game and the second to win two playoff games. In his second season, Sanchez again led the Jets to the AFC Championship Game, losing to the Pittsburgh Steelers; he joined Ben Roethlisberger as the only two quarterbacks in NFL history to reach the conference championship in their first two seasons in the league.

The next two seasons would be a regression for both the team and Sanchez as they failed to reach the playoffs and he was eventually replaced towards the end of the 2012 season by Greg McElroy. Sanchez suffered a season-ending shoulder injury during the preseason in 2013; he was released after the season concluded and was subsequently signed by the Philadelphia Eagles. After Eagles starter Nick Foles went down with an injury, Sanchez started the second half of the season and set career highs in completion percentage and passer rating. Nevertheless, Sanchez was unable to reestablish himself as a starter and spent one season each as a backup for the Dallas Cowboys, Chicago Bears, and Washington Redskins before retiring after the 2018 season.

After his playing career, Sanchez worked as an analyst for ESPN from 2019 to 2021 and for Fox Sports from 2021 until his firing in 2025.

== Early life ==
Mark Travis John Sanchez was born in Long Beach, California, to Nick Sr. and Olga Sanchez. When Sanchez was four, his parents divorced; Sanchez and his brothers, Nick Jr. and Brandon, stayed with their father but their mother remained involved in their upbringing. Sanchez initially lived in Whittier and Pico Rivera; when Sanchez was six, his father moved with the children to Rancho Santa Margarita, a predominantly white city in Orange County.

Sanchez's father remarried and raised them strictly, seeking to influence them to become leaders. Throughout his childhood and teenage years, Sanchez's father would have him combine athletic and mental training. Mark would have to dribble a basketball without looking at it while reciting multiplication tables; practice baseball swings in a batting cage while answering questions about the periodic table and similar combined drills that his father hoped would develop quick thinking and self-confidence that would guide Sanchez in all areas of life and not simply sports.

By the time Sanchez entered the eighth grade, he had developed an interest in football but was unsure of what position to play. Sanchez's father consulted coaches Bill Cunerty, who formerly coached at Saddleback College, and Bob Johnson, the head coach at Mission Viejo High School. Both coaches stated Sanchez could be a quarterback if he applied himself and was open to learning the intricacies of the position. Sanchez's father trained him during sessions in their backyard or at the park. Sanchez, who was attending Santa Margarita High School, joined the football team. During his first Varsity pass attempt as a sophomore in a game against El Modena High School, Sanchez threw a 55-yard touchdown to WR Bobby Whithorne on the first play of the fourth quarter to help Santa Margarita win 17–10.

Prior to his junior year of high school, Sanchez transferred to Mission Viejo, where Johnson, who was recognized as a "quarterback guru", having trained professionals like Carson Palmer, was head coach. Under Johnson's tutelage, Sanchez felt that he would have a better opportunity to become a better player. Johnson tutored Mark on the complexities of the position and in two seasons with the team, Mark led the Diablos to a 27–1 record culminating with the California Interscholastic Federation Division II championship in 2004.

Sanchez was named football player of the year by several major college recruiting services and was considered the top quarterback in the nation upon the conclusion of his high school football career in 2005.

In July 2004, Sanchez announced his commitment to the University of Southern California.

== College career ==
=== 2005 season ===
Being named the nation's top quarterback coming out of high school, Sanchez was well regarded upon his arrival at USC. With upperclassmen Matt Leinart and John David Booty returning, he did not play during his freshman year in 2005, opting to redshirt to preserve a year of eligibility. During this time, Sanchez participated as the quarterback of USC's scout team, earning the Trojans' Service Team Offensive Player of the Year Award.

=== 2006 season ===
In April 2006, Sanchez was arrested after a female USC student accused him of sexual assault. Sanchez was released from jail the following day and suspended. On June 3, 2006, the Los Angeles County District Attorney's office announced no charges would be filed, and Sanchez was reinstated, though he was disciplined by the football team for underage drinking and using false identification on the night he was arrested.

At the outset of the 2006 season, Sanchez competed for the starting quarterback position; once Booty, a junior, suffered severe back spasms caused by a pre-existing back condition, surgery was required and Sanchez was promoted to run the first-team offense during the spring as Booty recovered. Coaches stated Booty would be considered the starting quarterback when he returned for fall practice. During the 2006 season, Sanchez saw limited playing time in games against Arkansas, Stanford and Oregon. Through those three games, he completed three of seven pass attempts for 63 yards and an interception. Sanchez also saw additional action against Arizona, Michigan, and Notre Dame, but did not attempt any passes in those contests.

=== 2007 season ===
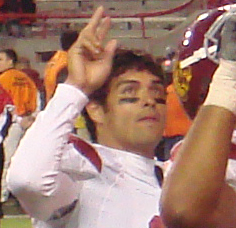
Sanchez in 2007

In fall practice, before USC's 2007 season, Sanchez broke his right thumb, missing the first game against Idaho; Sanchez returned the following week and served as the primary backup to Booty. Sanchez earned limited playing time in wins against Nebraska and Washington State. He was named the starting quarterback by head coach Pete Carroll against Arizona after Booty suffered a broken finger during a narrow 24–23 loss to Stanford.

On October 13, Sanchez led USC to a 20–13 victory, overcoming a wavering performance during the first half of the game in which he threw two interceptions, as Arizona went on to tie the game heading into halftime. During the second half, Sanchez was more proficient in passing the ball and ultimately finished the game completing 19-of-31 passes for 130 yards, a touchdown, and two interceptions. With Booty still recovering from his injury, USC elected to start Sanchez for a second consecutive week against Notre Dame; he made significant improvements, completing 21-of-38 passes for 235 yards and four touchdowns during the 38–0 victory.

On October 27, Sanchez started for the final time in place of the injured Booty in a road game against Oregon at Autzen Stadium. USC lost 24–17; Sanchez had two passes intercepted by Oregon safety Matthew Harper in the second half. The first interception led to a fourth-quarter touchdown that gave Oregon a 14-point lead and the second interception ended USC's final chance for a comeback. In spite of a myriad of mistakes committed by his teammates in addition to his own, Sanchez publicly accepted blame for the loss. The following week, against Oregon State, Booty returned as USC's starting quarterback, with Sanchez resuming his position as Booty's backup. Sanchez did not perform in subsequent games and finished the season with 695 yards, seven touchdowns, and five interceptions.

=== 2008 season ===
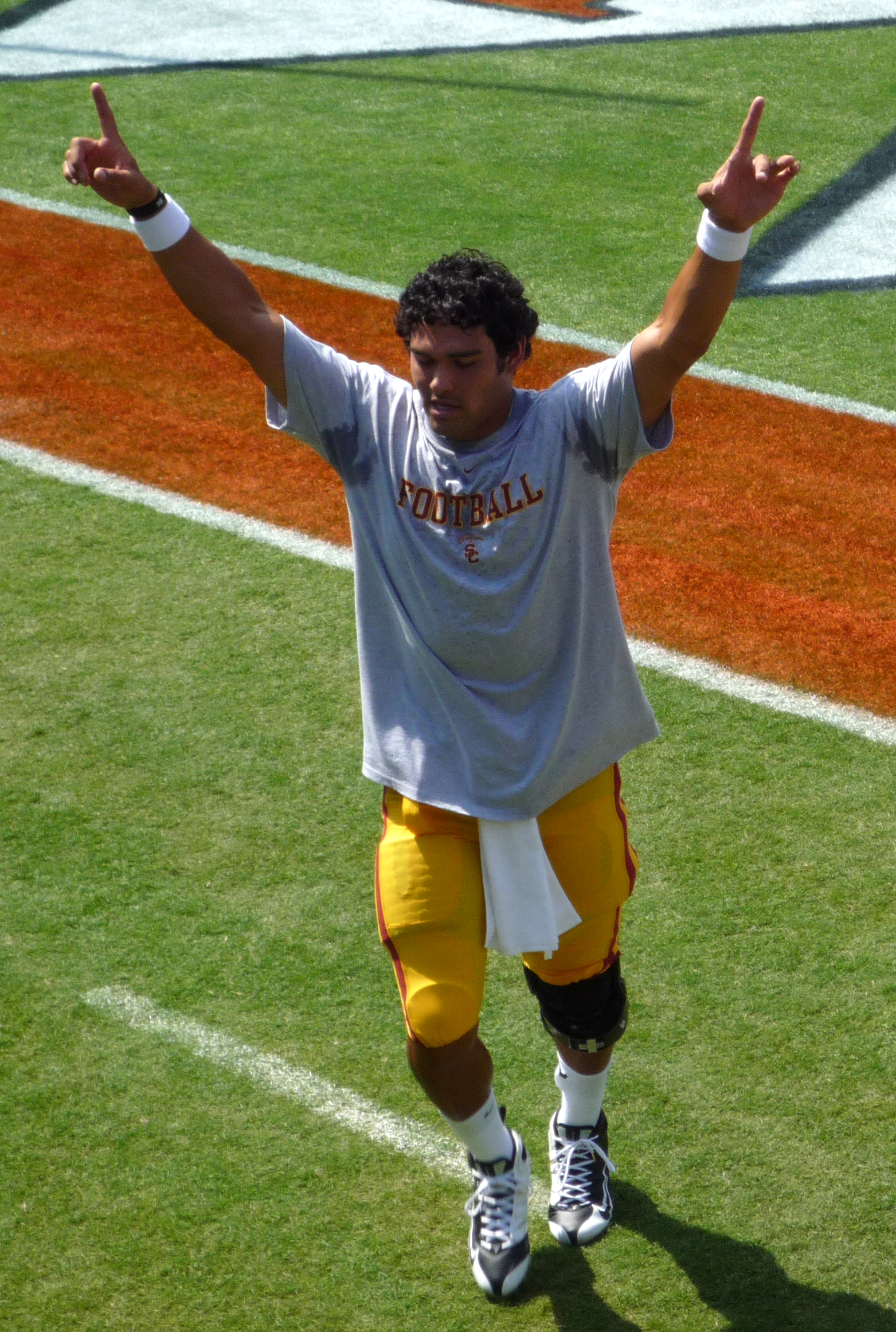
Sanchez runs off the field after pregame warm-ups before the 2008 season opener at Virginia

Sanchez entered spring practice after the 2008 season as the front-runner to take over the starting quarterback position, but faced strong competition from redshirt freshman Aaron Corp and Mitch Mustain, a transfer from Arkansas, where he had been the starting quarterback; Mustain, like Sanchez, was named the top quarterback in the nation upon the conclusion of high school career in 2006. By the end of spring practice, Carroll announced Sanchez would be the starting quarterback heading into the fall. During the first week of fall camp, Sanchez dislocated his left kneecap during warm-ups prior to practice; trainers immediately put the kneecap back into place. After missing nearly three weeks, Sanchez was cleared to play in the opener against Virginia. Prior to the opener, he was contacted by USC's previous three quarterbacks—Carson Palmer, Leinart, and Booty—who wished Sanchez well and offered general advice.

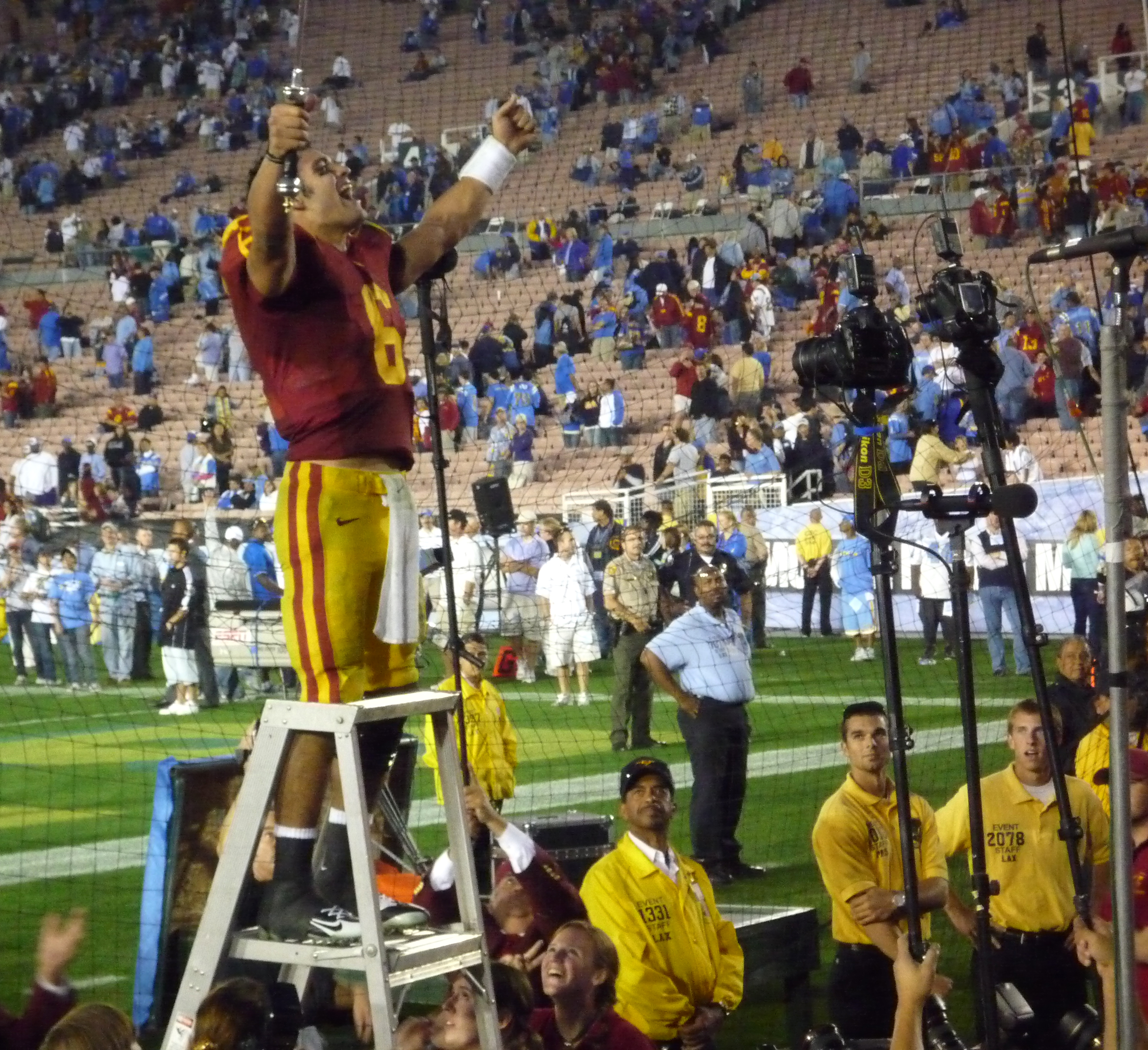
Sanchez, holding the sword of the USC drum major, salutes the fans after a victory in his final regular season game at rival UCLA.

In the season-opener at Virginia, Sanchez threw for a career-best 338 yards, completing 26-of-35 passes for three touchdowns and an interception. The Davey O'Brien Foundation named him the O'Brien Quarterback of the Week and his performance garnered early Heisman discussion. The Trojans suffered a stunning 27–21 loss against Oregon State on September 25. By the end of the season, the Trojans' lone loss was enough to remove them from contending for the BCS National Title and instead they were to play in the Rose Bowl against Penn State. The Trojans defeated the Nittany Lions 38–24. Sanchez won the 2009 Rose Bowl Most Valuable Player award for his performance on offense; his 413 passing yards ranked second in the history of the Rose Bowl and fourth in Trojan history. With Sanchez starting all 13 games, the Trojans ended the season 12–1 and ranked number two in the Coaches' Poll and number three in the AP Poll. Sanchez finished the season with 3,207 yards passing, 34 touchdowns (second most in Trojan history, behind Leinart), and 10 interceptions.

Upon the conclusion of the Rose Bowl, Sanchez stated it would be "hard to say goodbye to [USC]. I don't think I can do it." However, with the subsequent announcement that other NFL-caliber quarterbacks, such as Sam Bradford, Tim Tebow, and Colt McCoy had decided to stay in school, rumors arose that Sanchez would use the opportunity to enter the 2009 NFL draft. On January 15, Sanchez announced his plans to forgo his final year of college eligibility and enter the 2009 NFL Draft, although he continued as a USC student and completed work on his degree in the spring of 2009 while preparing for the draft.

Sanchez became the first USC quarterback to leave school early for the NFL since Todd Marinovich did so after the 1990 season. During the press conference, head coach Pete Carroll made it clear that he did not agree with Sanchez's decision, and advised him of the low success-rate of quarterbacks who left college early. Despite the public disagreement, the two remained close afterward.

== Professional career ==
=== Pre-draft ===
Sanchez hired his older brother and business litigator, Nick Sanchez Jr., to be his agent alongside David Dunn, who represented Carson Palmer. Sanchez received an invitation to the 2009 Scouting Combine, where his performance was well received. He was ranked as one of the top two quarterbacks, behind fellow junior Matthew Stafford from the University of Georgia. In the final days leading up to the draft, several NFL teams expressed serious interest in Sanchez, including the Seattle Seahawks (fourth overall selection), Cleveland Browns (fifth overall selection), Washington Redskins (13th overall selection), and New York Jets (17th overall selection).

Pre-draft measurables
Height	Weight	Arm length	Hand span	40-yard dash	10-yard split	20-yard split	20-yard shuttle	Three-cone drill	Vertical jump	Broad jump	Wonderlic
6 ft 2 1/8 in (1.88 m)	227 lb (103 kg)	33 1/2 in (0.85 m)	10 1/2 in (0.27 m)	5.00 s	1.77 s	2.91 s	4.21 s	7.06 s	32.5 in (0.83 m)	9 ft 8 in (2.95 m)	28
All values from NFL Combine

=== New York Jets ===
==== 2009 season ====
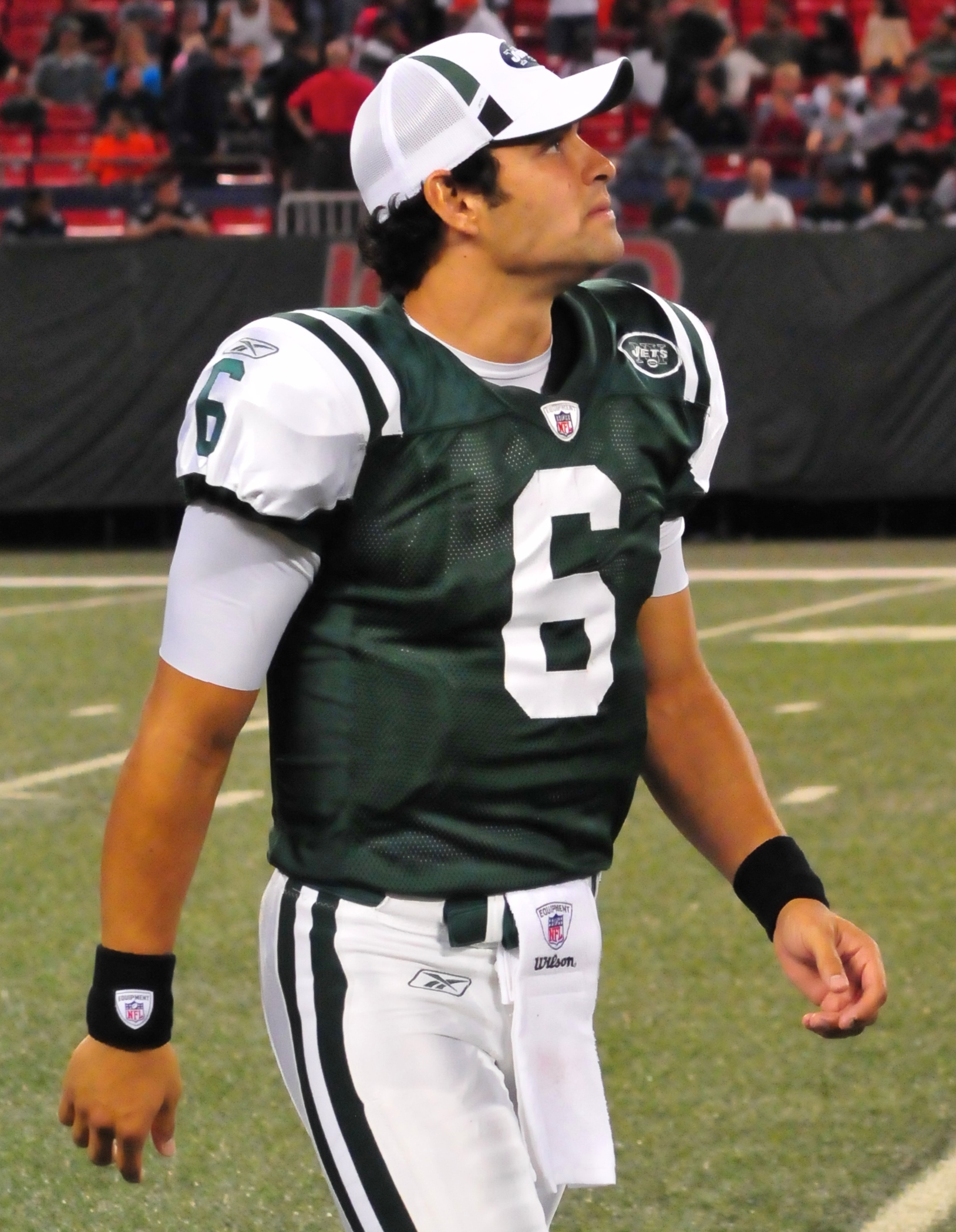
Sanchez in 2009

The New York Jets drafted Sanchez in the first round as the fifth overall pick in the 2009 NFL draft, making him the first quarterback selected by the Jets in the first round since Chad Pennington went 18th overall in the 2000 NFL draft. To select Sanchez, the Jets traded their first and second round selections and three players, Kenyon Coleman, Abram Elam, and Brett Ratliff, to the Browns. At the time, the selection was lauded as good value for both the team and Sanchez.

Sanchez reached an agreement with the team on June 10, 2009, signing a five-year, $50 million contract, with $28 million guaranteed. It is the largest contract the Jets signed a player to in franchise history.

Heading into his rookie training camp, Sanchez was listed as the second quarterback behind veteran Kellen Clemens. Jets head coach Rex Ryan viewed the camp as an opportunity for both quarterbacks to compete against each other to determine the eventual starter for the 2009 season. On August 26, 2009, Sanchez was named the starter, becoming the first rookie quarterback to start the season for the team since Dick Jamieson in 1960.

Sanchez started his first regular season NFL game against the Houston Texans on September 13, 2009, throwing his first touchdown pass, a 30-yard reception, to wide receiver Chansi Stuckey. The Jets won by a score of 24–7 with Sanchez throwing for 272 yards, the aforementioned touchdown, and an interception. He was named the Pepsi Rookie of the Week for his performance in the game, the first of three consecutive Rookie of the Week awards. Sanchez played his first home game a week later against the New England Patriots, a 16–9 victory; it was also his first AFC East division game and his first rivalry game. It was the Jets' first victory over New England at home since 2000. With a 24–17 victory over the Tennessee Titans in Week 3, Sanchez became the first rookie quarterback in NFL history to start and win his first three games of an NFL season. However, his performance began to regress as he had a pass intercepted for a 99-yard touchdown return, and fumbled another attempted pass in the end zone for another touchdown, as the Jets fell to the New Orleans Saints in Week 4. These two plays were enough to spoil an otherwise strong outing from the Jets's defensive unit as the team dropped to a 3–1 record. Following the loss to New Orleans, Sanchez received criticism in a 16–13 overtime loss to the Buffalo Bills in Week 6 when he threw five interceptions against a lowly Bills defense that previously had only four interceptions all season long. The Jets ended their losing streak in a 38–0 victory against the Oakland Raiders in Week 7. Sanchez was criticized after he was seen eating a hot dog on the Jets' bench in the fourth quarter.

In the team's second meeting against the Bills on December 3, 2009, Sanchez suffered a sprained posterior cruciate ligament in the third quarter, prompting the veteran Clemens to take his place. Though there were no setbacks to the injury, head coach Ryan benched Sanchez the following game against the Tampa Bay Buccaneers for precautionary reasons, much to Sanchez's dismay. At 7–7, the Jets had a chance to secure a playoff berth if they won the remainder of their games. One such game was against the Indianapolis Colts who had 23 consecutive regular season wins. Sanchez and the Jets engineered a comeback win following Colts head coach Jim Caldwell's decision to controversially rest the team starters in the third quarter with a five-point lead. The following week, on January 3, 2010, Sanchez led the team into the playoffs, despite a subpar effort, completing 8 of 16 passes for 63 yards, en route to a 37–0 victory over the Cincinnati Bengals, who rested their starters as the team had already clinched the AFC North division title and a playoff berth. The manner of the two wins, which gave the Jets their first playoff berth since 2006, caused many to claim the team had "backed into the playoffs". Sanchez completed his rookie season with 2,444 yards, 12 touchdowns, and 20 interceptions.

===== 2009 postseason =====
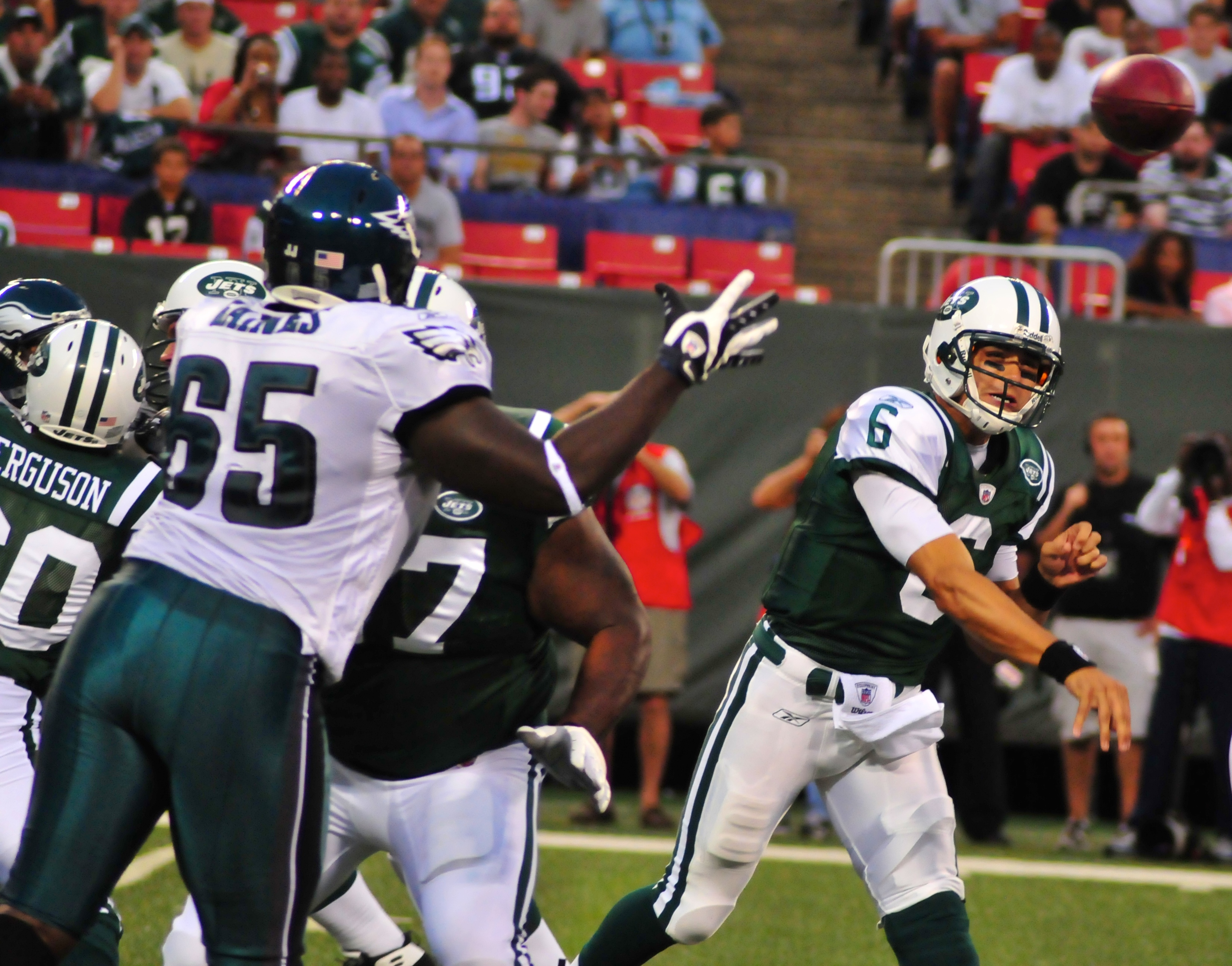
Sanchez after throwing a pass during a preseason game against the Philadelphia Eagles.

In the Wild Card Round, which took place on January 9, 2010, at Paul Brown Stadium, Sanchez led the Jets to another victory over the Bengals, 24–14, behind his positive performance where he completed 12 of 15 passes for 182 yards and a touchdown with a passer rating of 139.4. Sanchez became the fourth rookie quarterback in NFL history to win his first postseason contest, and the second to do so on the road. The others were Shaun King (1999 Bucs), Ben Roethlisberger (2004 Steelers), and Joe Flacco (2008 Ravens). On January 17, 2010, Sanchez, with the help of running back and fellow rookie Shonn Greene, defeated the heavily favored San Diego Chargers 17–14 to attain the Jets' third AFC Championship appearance in franchise history. Sanchez became only the second rookie quarterback to win two consecutive playoff games, behind Joe Flacco. In a rematch of their regular season meeting with the Colts, Sanchez performed well in the first half however, the offense succumbed to the Colts' defense in the second half and the Jets gave up an 11-point lead, losing by a score of 30–17. Sanchez was named to Sporting News' All-Rookie team for his performance during the season, becoming the first Jets quarterback to ever receive the award.

==== 2010 season ====
On February 17, 2010, Sanchez underwent surgery to repair the patella ligament in his left knee that he originally injured when he played for USC. The surgery was successful. Sanchez was expected to miss early workouts and return in time for training camp however Sanchez made a quick recovery and participated in team drills during Organized Team Activities (OTA). The Jets opened the 2010 season with a 5–1 record despite the passing game being subpar as Sanchez struggled to accurately throw the football. Sanchez recorded his first career 300-yard passing game in a win over the Detroit Lions on November 7, 2010. He earned AFC Offensive Player of the Week for his Week 11 game against the Houston Texans. At 10–4, the Jets faced the Chicago Bears on December 26, 2010, with a chance to clinch a playoff berth. Though Sanchez injured his shoulder in a victory over Pittsburgh the previous week, he started the game completing 24 of 37 passes for a touchdown and an interception. However, the Jets were unable to defend the Bears' offense and subsequently lost the game 38–34 after a comeback drive was halted when Sanchez was intercepted. Fortunately for them, due to a loss by the Jacksonville Jaguars that same day, the Jets clinched the playoff berth. Sanchez finished the season with 3,291 yards, 17 touchdowns, and 13 interceptions.

===== 2010 postseason =====
The Jets finished the season with an 11–5 record and entered the wild card round facing the Indianapolis Colts in a rematch of their previous encounter in the AFC Championship. Although Sanchez had a subpar performance completing 18 of 31 passes while throwing an interception, he led the team in the final minutes of the game on a comeback drive culminating with kicker Nick Folk kicking the game-winning field goal as time expired. The Jets went on to face the New England Patriots in the divisional round and upset the heavily favored Patriots, 28–21, as Sanchez completed 16 of 25 passes for 194 yards and three touchdowns. With the win, Sanchez tied Len Dawson, Roger Staubach, Jake Delhomme, and Joe Flacco for the second most post-season road victories by a quarterback in NFL history. The team traveled to the AFC Championship, for a second consecutive season, to face the Pittsburgh Steelers on January 23, 2011.

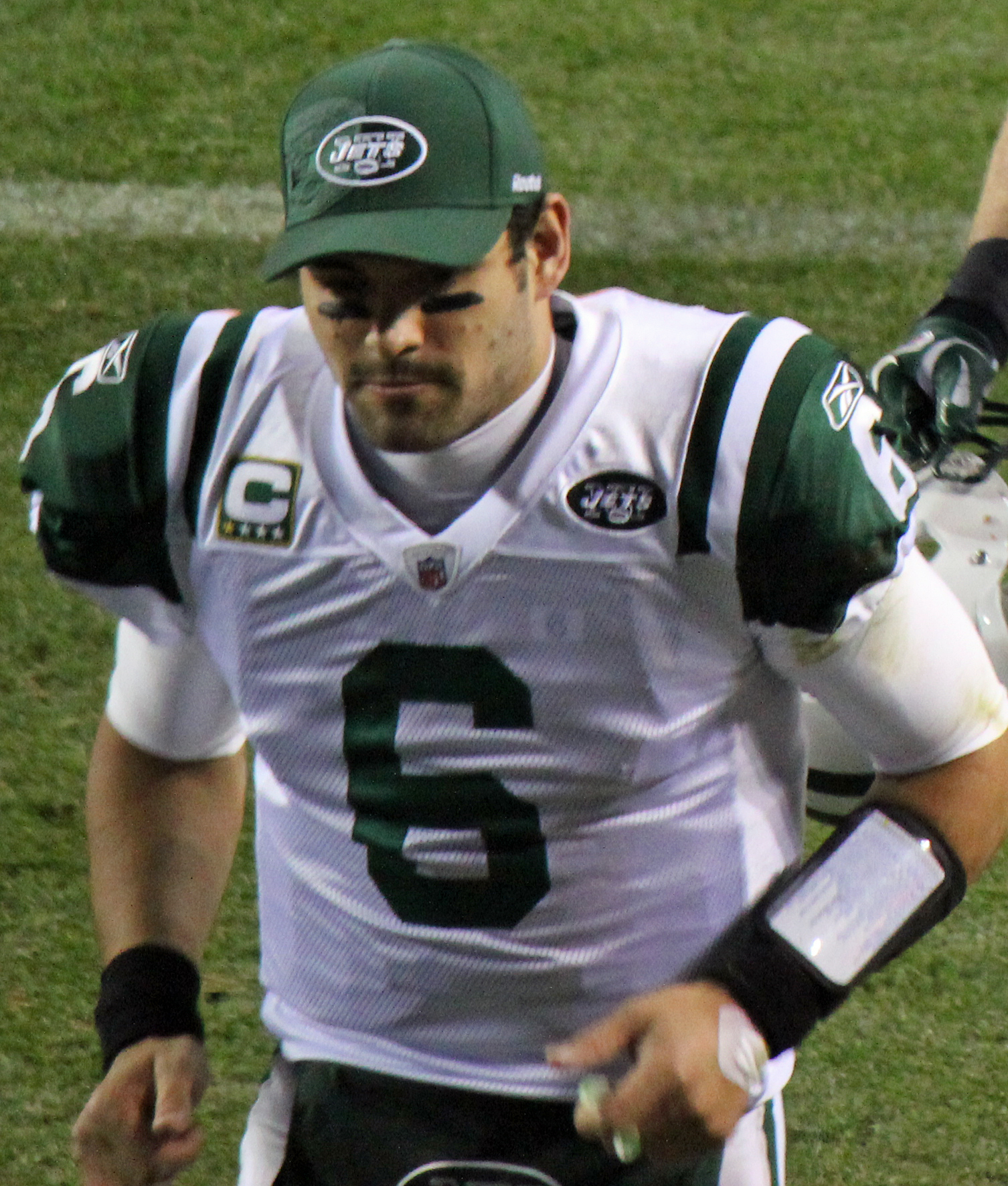
Mark Sanchez after a game on November 17, 2011.

Heading into halftime trailing 24–3, the team, led by Sanchez, engineered a comeback following a heartfelt speech given by the quarterback at halftime. Although the Jets' defense did not allow Pittsburgh to score in the second half, the team fell short as their final offensive drive was stymied by the Steelers' defense and the Jets lost 24–19.

==== 2011 season ====
Prior to the outset of the 2011 season, head coach Rex Ryan named Sanchez a team captain. The Jets opened the season with a 2–3 record leading to discontent within the clubhouse. The team had begun to stray from their philosophy of consistently running the ball and began to pass more often; however, the offense struggled with this adjustment. Wide receivers Plaxico Burress, Santonio Holmes, and Derrick Mason approached coach Ryan to question offensive coordinator Brian Schottenheimer's system as Holmes and Mason averaged only three catches per game and Burress only 2.5 catches through four games. Additionally, Sanchez drew criticism for his difficulties to effectively throw the ball to his receivers. The struggles culminated with Holmes getting into a heated argument with another teammate in the huddle during their final regular season game against the Miami Dolphins. Holmes was benched in the fourth quarter while Sanchez threw three interceptions in the Jets' loss that eliminated the team from playoff contention for the first time in Sanchez's career. Statistically, Sanchez had similar numbers in a comparison to Eli Manning when he concluded his third year of football however, there were concerns that Sanchez was simply an ineffective quarterback and therefore expendable. During the offseason, Sanchez was criticized by anonymous teammates for his poor work ethic and his inability to improve; these claims were publicly refuted by other teammates. Despite questions surrounding his job security, after New York acquired Tim Tebow, the Jets agreed to a 3-year contract extension with Sanchez on March 9, 2012. The contract included $20 million in guarantees.

==== 2012 season ====
The Jets opened their 2012 season against the Buffalo Bills with Sanchez completing 19 of 27 passes for 266 yards, 3 touchdowns, and an interception in a 48–28 rout of the Bills. In the subsequent four games, Sanchez became the first quarterback since Stoney Case in 1999 to complete under 50% of his passes in four straight contests as the Jets fell to a 2–3 record. This led to fierce criticism from the media and fans and prompted calls for Sanchez to be benched in favor of Tim Tebow. Sanchez snapped this streak against the Indianapolis Colts on October 14, 2012, completing 11 of 18 passes for 82 yards and 2 touchdowns in a 35–9 victory over Indianapolis.

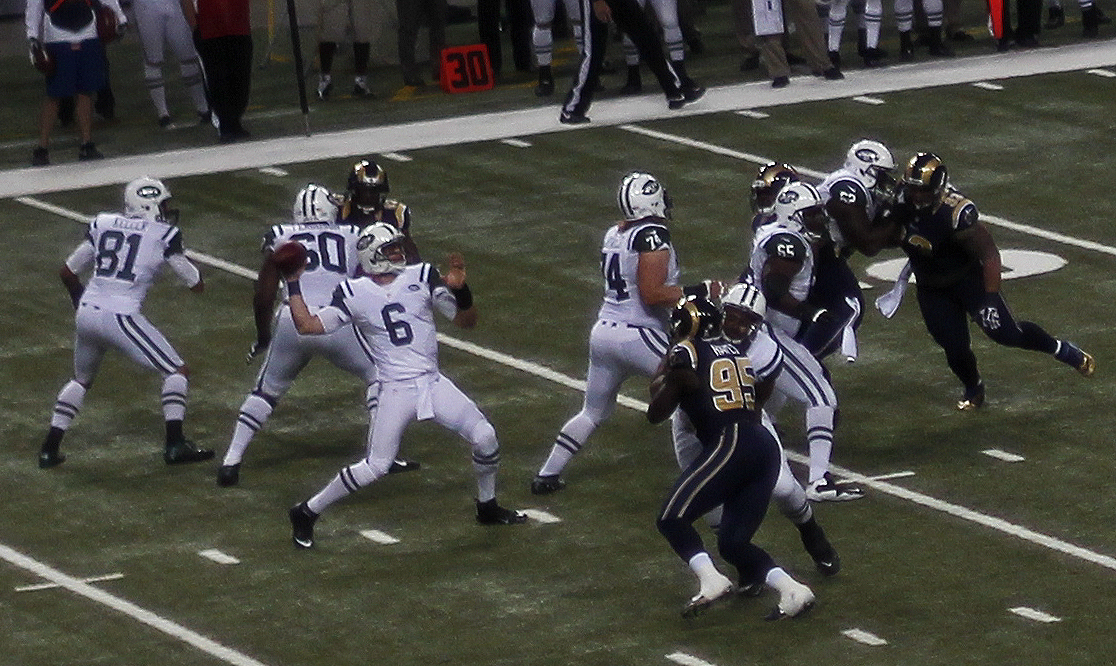
Sanchez prepares to throw against the St. Louis Rams in 2012.

The following week, the Jets faced their division rivals, the Patriots. Despite a second-half lead by New England, the game was tied at the end of regulation forcing overtime. Following a Patriots field goal, Sanchez had the ball knocked out his hand by linebacker Rob Ninkovich who recovered the fumble and sealed the Patriots' victory. This was Sanchez's best overall performance to that point in the season as he completed a career record 68% of his passes when attempting 40 or more passes. Sanchez's struggles continued in the following two games against Miami and Seattle; in Seattle, Sanchez completed 9 of 22 passes for 124 yards while throwing his fourth red zone interception of the year and was the fifth game of the season where he completed under 50% of his pass attempts.

The Jets snapped their losing streak in a 27–13 victory over the St. Louis Rams in which Sanchez completed 15 of 20 passes for 178 yards and a touchdown. However, his struggles continued in a rematch against New England on Thanksgiving night. Despite completing 26 of 36 of his passes for 301 yards, a touchdown, and an interception, the Jets lost to the Patriots 49–19 and fell to 4–7 as Sanchez turned the ball over twice—each turnover led to Patriots touchdowns. The Jets surrendered 21 points within a 53-second span on 3 turnovers. The play that earned Sanchez the most criticism was a second-quarter fumble where he ran into the backside of lineman Brandon Moore and the Patriots scored on the resulting fumble; this play, becoming widely known as the butt fumble, was mocked in the media.

Sanchez started the next week, but was benched in the third quarter of the Jets' contest against the Arizona Cardinals on December 2, 2012, in favor of third string back-up Greg McElroy. Prior to being benched by Rex Ryan, Sanchez threw three interceptions. McElroy threw a touchdown to tight end Jeff Cumberland to score the team's only points in a 7–6 victory over Arizona. Rex Ryan renamed Sanchez the starting quarterback the following Wednesday after seeking out multiple opinions within the organization. Sanchez returned to complete 12 of 19 passes for 111 yards against the Jacksonville Jaguars, fumbling once that led to a Jaguars field goal. The Jets won 17–10. In a must-win game against the Tennessee Titans to remain in playoff contention, Sanchez struggled; he completed 13 of 28 passes for 131 yards while throwing four interceptions and fumbling the ball in Titans territory in the closing minutes of the Jets' 14–10 defeat. A day later, Ryan named McElroy the starter. Sanchez started the Jets' final game against the Buffalo Bills after McElroy revealed he had been experiencing concussion symptoms in the days preceding. The Jets were defeated 28–9 with Sanchez completing 17 of 35 passes for 205 yards and two turnovers.

==== 2013 season ====
Sanchez suffered a shoulder injury on August 24, 2013, in the Jets' third game of the preseason against the New York Giants after being tackled by nose tackle Marvin Austin. The Jets, who drafted rookie quarterback Geno Smith in the 2013 NFL draft, named Smith the starter on September 4 with Sanchez still recovering from his injury. On September 14, 2013, Sanchez was placed on injured reserve with a designation to return. After undergoing shoulder surgery on October 8, 2013, it was announced he would miss the rest of the season. After much speculation regarding his future in New York, the Jets released Sanchez on March 21, 2014, the same day they signed Michael Vick, the former Atlanta Falcons and Philadelphia Eagles quarterback.

=== Philadelphia Eagles ===
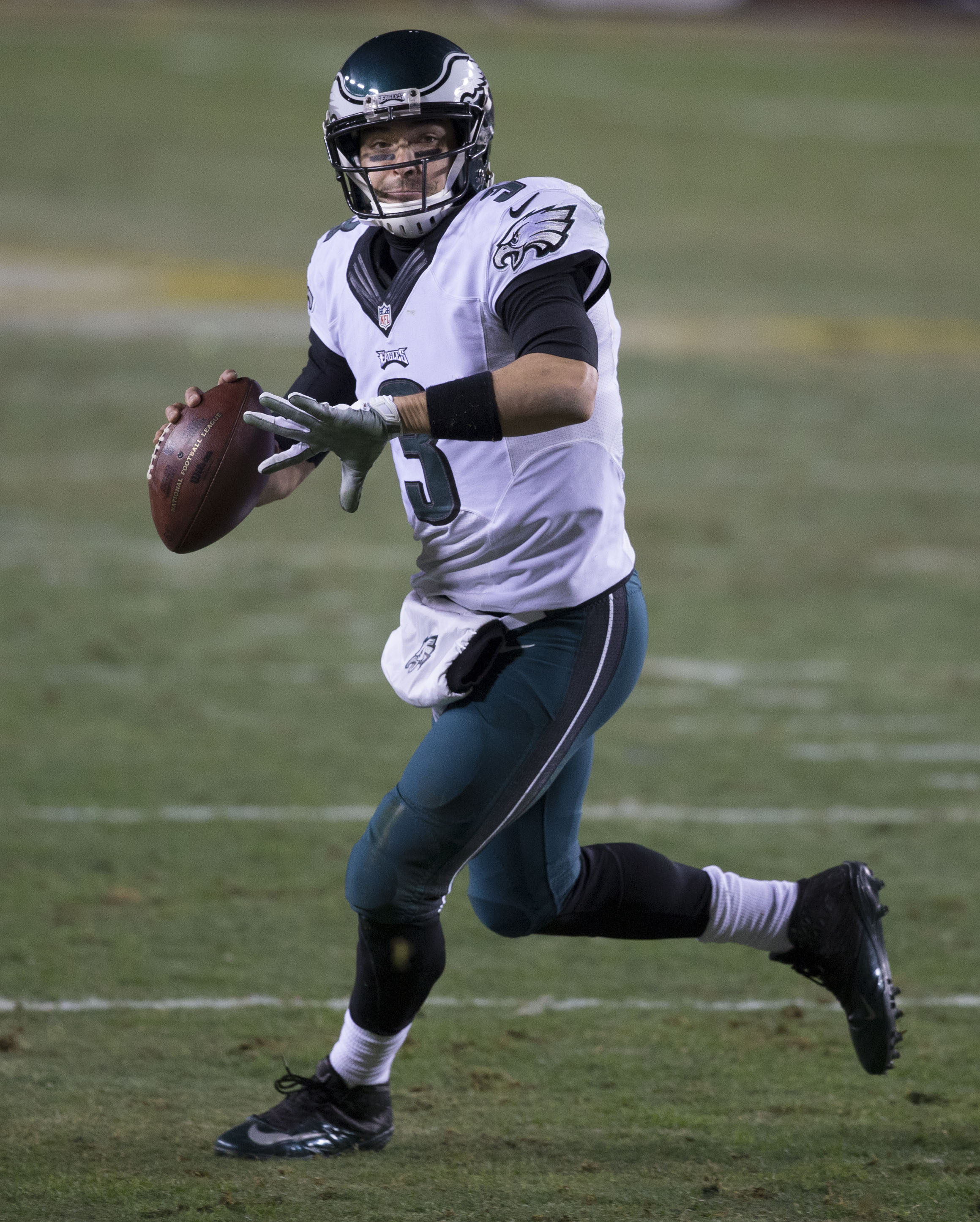
Mark Sanchez as a member of the Eagles.

==== 2014 season ====
Sanchez signed with the Philadelphia Eagles on March 29, 2014, for a one-year, $2.25 million contract. After spending seven full games as Nick Foles' backup, Sanchez filled-in for an injured Foles, in a Week 9 game against the Houston Texans. Throwing for 202 yards, two touchdowns, and two interceptions, Sanchez led the Eagles to a 31–21 win. After the game, Eagles head coach, Chip Kelly, praised Sanchez, saying, "He's a hell of a quarterback and we're excited that we got him." Foles was later confirmed to be out for 6 to 8 weeks with a broken collarbone, meaning Sanchez would take over as the team's quarterback.

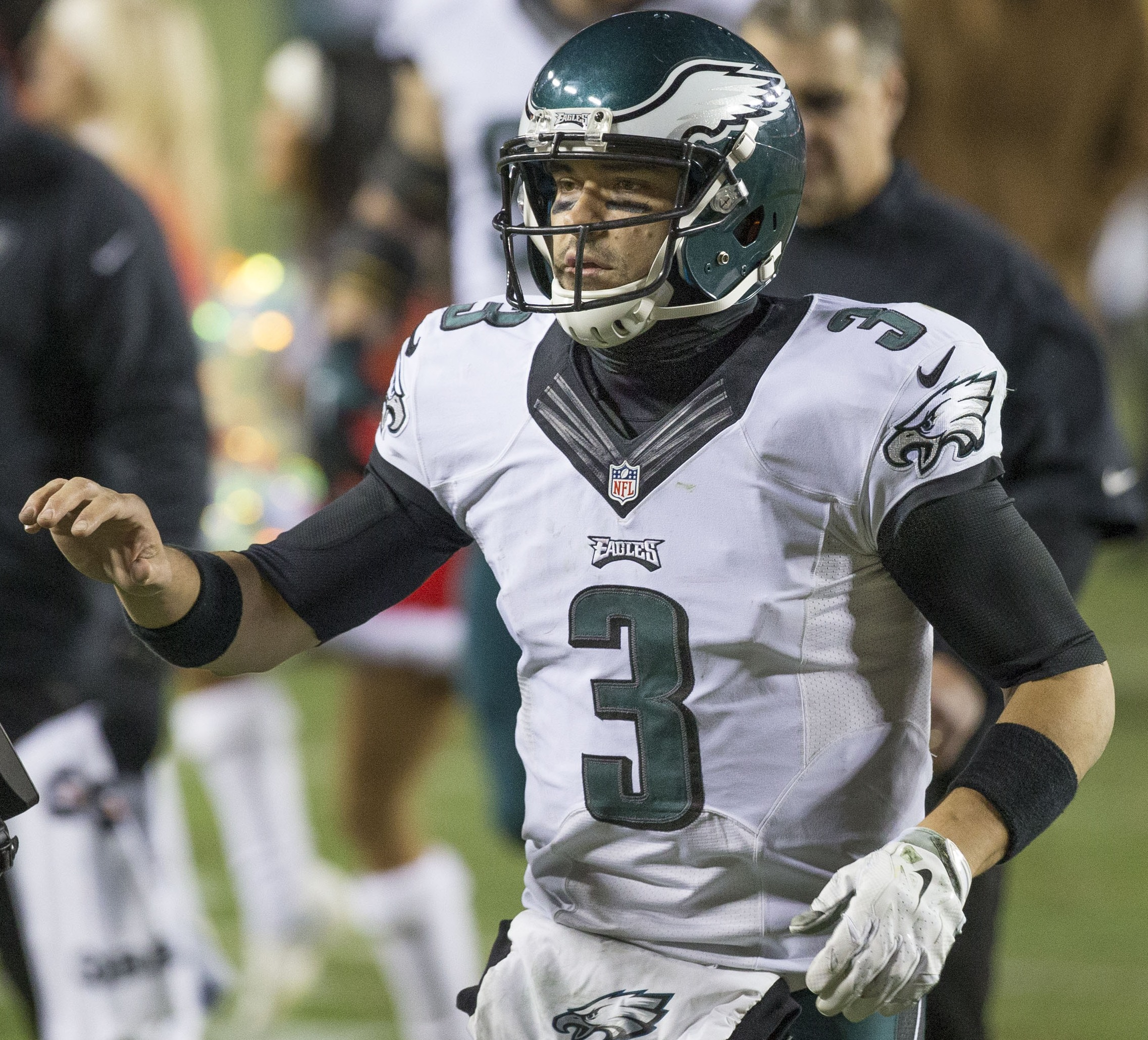
Sanchez in 2014

On November 10, 2014, Sanchez started his first game for the Eagles and led them in a 45–21 rout of the visiting Carolina Panthers on Monday Night Football. Even though it was his first start at quarterback since December 2012, Sanchez notched two touchdowns as he threw for 332 yards—the fourth highest total in his NFL career. The victory also marked the first time he had ever thrown for more than 265 yards without an interception. Sanchez followed this with a 53–20 loss against Green Bay, where he threw for 346 yards and two touchdowns, but was also intercepted twice and lost two fumbles. Sanchez came back with two consecutive wins, a 43–24 rout of the Titans where he threw for 300 yards in his third consecutive start, and a 33–10 win against the Cowboys on Thanksgiving, where he logged 207 yards and a touchdown as well as 28 rushing yards and a score. With the Eagles at a 9–3 record, and his record as a starter at 3–1, the Eagles looked poised to win the NFC East, but after three consecutive losses and playoff elimination, he finished the 2014 season with a 4–4 record as the Eagles starting quarterback. In nine games and eight starts, he threw for 2,418 yards, 14 touchdowns, and 11 interceptions with a 64.0 completion percentage, while rushing for 87 yards and one touchdown, with a career-high 88.4 passer rating.

==== 2015 season ====
The Eagles re-signed Sanchez to a two-year, $16 million contract on March 8, 2015, but despite his play in the 2014 season, he remained the backup quarterback as Nick Foles was traded for Sam Bradford. In Bradford's first several games, he had thrown more interceptions than touchdowns and often had a low completion percentage, but head coach Chip Kelly refused to bench Bradford in favor of Sanchez. Ironically, Sanchez would get his first playing time when Bradford was playing his best football of the season.

On November 15, 2015, Sanchez came into a Week 10 game against the Miami Dolphins in relief of injured starter Sam Bradford with the Eagles trailing 20–16 late in the 3rd quarter. Sanchez went 14 of 23 with 156 yards and an interception. The interception was costly as it occurred in the endzone when the Eagles were in field goal range down 20–19, which ended up being the final score of the game.

Sanchez was announced as the starter for the Eagles in the Week 11 game against the Tampa Bay Buccaneers after it was revealed that Bradford suffered a separated shoulder and a concussion. Sanchez's opening drive was excellent, completing 100% of his passes and ending it with a 39-yard touchdown pass to Josh Huff to make the score 7–0. Sanchez continued to play well for the majority of the 1st half, and threw a second touchdown pass to Darren Sproles, but the Buccaneers offense had already scored 21 points. However, after that drive, Sanchez started to crumble, throwing an interception near the end of the second quarter. Sanchez finished the game with three interceptions, one of which was returned for a touchdown, in a humiliating 45–17 blowout. His two touchdown passes were the only points scored by the offense.

Sanchez once again put up the only points for the offense in another humiliating blowout, this time a 45–14 loss to the Detroit Lions. Sanchez played relatively well, avoiding a 3-and-out on the first drive with a 5-yard scramble and managing to tie the game 7–7 with a touchdown pass to Brent Celek, but a defensive meltdown and lack of offensive momentum left the Eagles hopeless, and Sanchez finished his Eagles record with an 0–2 record as starter. Sanchez finished 19 of 27 for 199 yards, 2 touchdowns, and no interceptions, with a passer rating of 116.1.

Despite his above average passer rating, Sanchez proceeded to go back to the bench the next week due to his winless record as starter, and he would not throw another pass for the rest of the season.

=== Denver Broncos ===
On March 11, 2016, Sanchez was traded to the Denver Broncos for a 2017 conditional draft pick. Prior to his arrival to the Broncos, Peyton Manning had retired and Brock Osweiler had signed with the Houston Texans. This opened up a competition for the Broncos starting quarterback job between Sanchez, second-year player Trevor Siemian, and rookie Paxton Lynch. On August 29, Broncos head coach Gary Kubiak named Siemian the starting quarterback for the 2016 season. On September 3, 2016, Sanchez was released by the team.

=== Dallas Cowboys ===
On September 3, 2016, hours after the Broncos released him, Sanchez signed a one-year $2 million contract with the Dallas Cowboys, who were looking to have a veteran presence behind rookie Dak Prescott, who was named the starter at quarterback while Tony Romo recovered from a vertebral compression fracture he suffered during the first quarter of the Cowboys' Week 3 preseason game against the Seattle Seahawks.

In the regular-season finale against the Philadelphia Eagles with the Cowboys already having clinched the NFC's #1 seed, Sanchez split time with starter Prescott and backup Romo. Prescott played the first two series of the game, Romo played the third, and Sanchez played the rest of the game. Sanchez completed nine of 17 passes for 85 yards and had two interceptions as the Cowboys lost on the road by a score of 27–13.

=== Chicago Bears ===
On March 23, 2017, Sanchez signed a one-year contract with the Chicago Bears. The Bears had noted the "positive influence" Sanchez had as a mentor to rookie quarterback Dak Prescott and looked for him to play a similar role in the development of rookie Mitchell Trubisky.

On May 30, 2017, Sanchez suffered a small knee injury in his left knee. He missed the remainder of the team's organized activities and the mini-camp. In response, the Bears rescinded the waiver request to Connor Shaw following the injury to Sanchez. Sanchez made the Bears' final roster third on the quarterback depth chart behind Trubisky and Mike Glennon, but did not play at all in 2017.

On April 13, 2018, Sanchez, while still a free agent, was suspended for four games for violating the NFL's performance-enhancing drug policy. Sanchez tested positive for performance-enhancing drugs and cited "unknowing supplement contamination" in his statement to the media following the suspension.

=== Washington Redskins ===
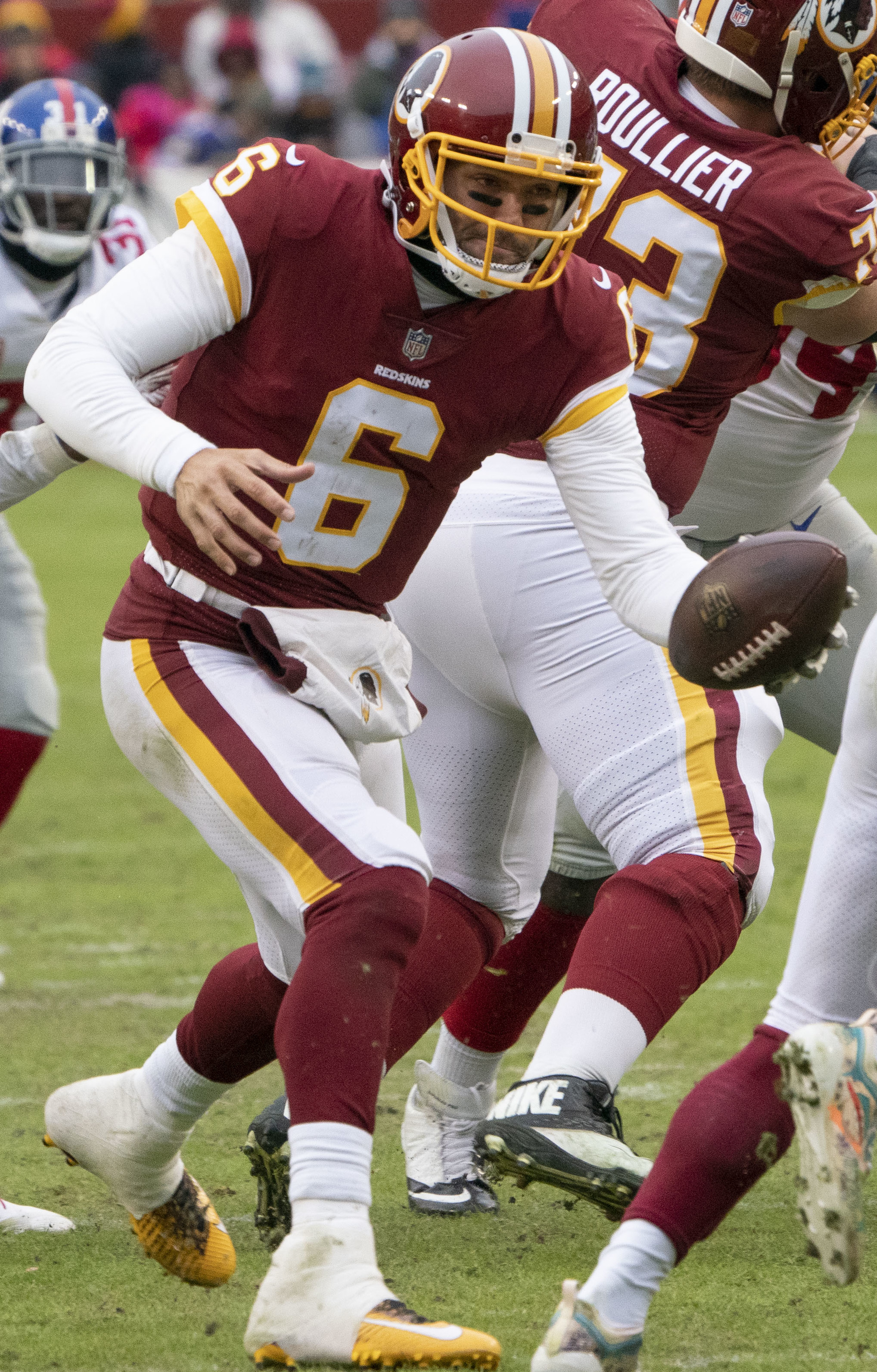
Sanchez in 2018

On November 19, 2018, Sanchez signed with the Washington Redskins to serve as the backup to Colt McCoy, after starter Alex Smith suffered a season-ending leg injury.

Sanchez made his first appearance with the Redskins for an injured McCoy in a 28–13 loss to his former team, the Philadelphia Eagles. He completed 13 passes from 21 attempts for 100 yards and an interception. Sanchez became the starter after McCoy fractured his fibula in the game. In Week 14, Sanchez was benched at halftime during a 40–16 loss to the New York Giants in favor for Josh Johnson, after throwing two interceptions and only 38 yards in the first half. The next day, the Redskins named Johnson their starter for the Week 15 game against the Jacksonville Jaguars.

=== Retirement ===
Sanchez announced his retirement on July 23, 2019, and subsequently took a position with ESPN's college football coverage. In 2021, Sanchez moved from ESPN to Fox, where he called NFL games and appears on FS1 studio shows.

== Career statistics ==
=== NFL ===
Legend
**Bold**	Career high

==== Regular season ====
Year	Team	Games			Passing								Rushing				Sacks		Fumbles	
Year	Team	GP	GS	Record	Cmp	Att	Pct	Yds	Y/A	TD	Int	Rtg	Att	Yds	Y/A	TD	Sck	Yds	Fum	Lost
2009	NYJ	15	15	8–7	196	364	53.8	2,444	6.7	12	**20**	63.0	36	**106**	2.9	3	26	195	10	3
2010	NYJ	**16**	**16**	**11–5**	278	507	54.8	3,291	6.5	17	13	75.3	30	105	3.5	3	27	171	9	1
2011	NYJ	**16**	**16**	8–8	**308**	**543**	56.7	**3,474**	6.4	**26**	18	78.2	**37**	103	2.8	**6**	**39**	**243**	10	**8**
2012	NYJ	15	15	6–9	246	453	54.3	2,883	6.4	13	18	66.9	22	28	1.3	0	34	209	**14**	**8**
2013	NYJ	0	0	–	Did not play due to injury															
2014	PHI	9	8	4–4	198	309	64.1	2,418	**7.8**	14	11	**88.4**	34	87	2.6	1	23	151	7	3
2015	PHI	4	2	0–2	59	91	**64.8**	616	6.7	4	4	80.7	6	22	**3.7**	0	9	54	1	1
2016	DAL	2	0	–	10	18	55.6	93	5.2	0	2	30.3	4	−2	−0.5	0	3	25	0	0
2017	CHI	0	0	–	DNP															
2018	WAS	2	1	0–1	19	35	54.3	138	3.9	0	3	28.0	1	8	8.0	0	7	42	1	0
Career		79	73	37–36	1,314	2,320	56.6	15,357	6.6	86	89	73.2	170	457	2.7	13	168	1,090	52	24

==== Postseason ====
Year	Team	Games		Passing									Rushing				Sacks		Fumbles	
Year	Team	GP	GS	Record	Cmp	Att	Pct	Yds	Y/A	TD	Int	Rtg	Att	Yds	Y/A	TD	Sck	YdsL	Fum	Lost
2009	NYJ	**3**	**3**	2–1	41	68	60.3	539	**7.9**	4	**2**	92.7	**6**	−2	−0.3	0	1	7	0	0
2010	NYJ	**3**	**3**	2–1	**54**	**89**	**60.9**	**616**	6.9	**5**	1	**97.3**	5	**11**	**2.2**	0	**3**	**19**	**1**	0
2016	DAL	0	0	–	DNP															
Career		6	6	4–2	95	157	60.5	1,155	7.36	9	3	94.3	11	9	0.8	0	4	26	1	0

=== College ===
Season	Team	Games		Passing								Rushing			
Season	Team	GP	GS	Att	Cmp	Pct	Yds	Y/A	TD	Int	Rtg	Att	Yds	Y/A	TD
2006	USC	3	0	7	3	42.9	63	9.0	0	1	89.9	4	−5	−1.3	1
2007	USC	6	3	114	69	60.5	695	6.1	7	5	123.2	14	22	1.6	0
2008	USC	13	13	366	241	65.8	3,207	8.8	34	10	164.6	52	16	0.3	3
Total		22	16	487	313	64.3	3,965	8.1	41	16	153.9	70	33	0.3	4

== Career highlights ==
=== Awards and honors ===
Award/Honor	Year(s)
National Football League
Pepsi NFL Rookie of the Week	2009
Sporting News All Rookie Team	2009
College
Rose Bowl Champion	2007, 2008, 2009
Rose Bowl Offensive Most Valuable Player	2009
First-team All-Pac-10	2008
Sports Illustrated and Pro Football Weekly All-American Honorable Mention	2008
High school
Super Prep All-American Player of the Year	2004
Parade All-American Player of the Year	2004
CIF Division II Champion	2004
All-CIF Division II Co-Offensive Player of the Year	2004

=== Records ===
==== NFL records ====
- Third most postseason road victories by an NFL quarterback: 4 (tied with Jake Delhomme, Len Dawson, and Roger Staubach)
- Most playoff victories by a rookie quarterback: 2 (tied with Joe Flacco, Brock Purdy, and Jayden Daniels)
- Most consecutive conference championship game appearances to begin career: 2 (tied with Ben Roethlisberger)

==== New York Jets franchise records ====
- Most career postseason victories by an NFL quarterback: 4
- Longest touchdown pass in a playoff game (2009): 80
- Most game winning drives in a single season (2010): 6
- Most regular season wins by a starting quarterback in 16 starts (2010): 11 (tied with Ken O'Brien in 1985)

==== Philadelphia Eagles franchise records ====
- Most pass completions, game (37, tied with Sam Bradford)

== Television and film career ==
On October 15, 2020, Sanchez was revealed to have partaken in season four of The Masked Singer as "Baby Alien" who is the show's first costume to incorporate a puppet. As Nick Cannon had a hard time figuring out how to remove Baby Alien's mask upon elimination, he had to receive help from the Men in Black to do the job.

== Player profile ==
Early in his career, Sanchez was praised for his ability to maintain composure in the pocket amidst defensive pressure and focus on finding an open receiver to extend the team's offensive series. In his first four years, Sanchez had ten fourth quarter comebacks and twelve game winning drives. These characteristics were highlighted by Bill Parcells and Sam Wyche and garnered comparisons to Ben Roethlisberger. Sanchez was also noted for his proficiency in short passing situations and competitive nature; in December 2010, following dismal performances, Rex Ryan threatened to reduce Sanchez's repetitions with the first-team offense during practice which infuriated Sanchez.

In December 2012, following a series of poor performances that eventually led to his benching, a panel of former NFL quarterbacks were questioned about Sanchez's different attributes. It was unanimously agreed upon that his arm strength was "good enough" to succeed in the league and that he could be effective while mobile in the pocket. His regression was mainly attributed to his poor accuracy, a byproduct of his indecisive mentality once the ball is snapped, and the fact the Jets did little to help surround Sanchez with the talent to overcome his shortcomings. Ron Jaworski commented that Sanchez had lost his confidence which contributed to his decline.

While Sanchez has embraced a playboy lifestyle, drawing comparisons to former Jet Joe Namath, he was praised by Brian Schottenheimer for his ability to work with various personalities and build relationships with teammates. After undergoing knee surgery following his rookie season, Sanchez established "Jets West" in 2010, an annual off-season camp located in his home state of California. Sanchez hosts workouts and offers classroom review sessions for his skill-position teammates on offense for one week. During the NFL labor dispute, Sanchez managed to organize private workouts with over forty of his teammates.

== Personal life ==
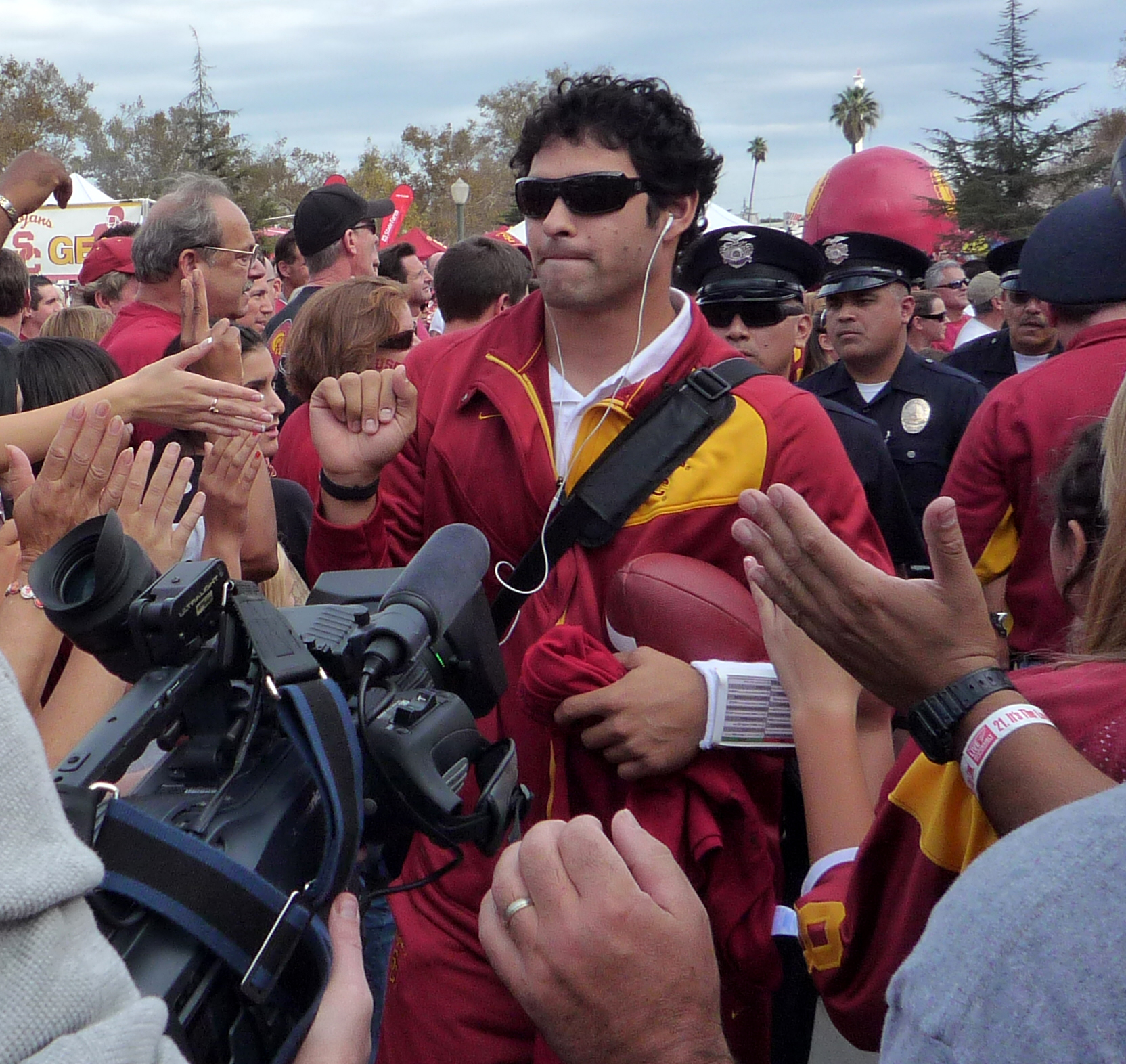
Sanchez on USC's traditional pregame "Trojan Walk"

Sanchez is an avid fan of musical theatre. He was a presenter at the 2010 Tony Awards, where he introduced a number from the Broadway musical Memphis. Sanchez has been involved in multiple charities including the Juvenile Diabetes Research Foundation to help raise awareness for Type 1 diabetes and Sam's Club's Giving Made Simple which, helps raise awareness about childhood obesity and how families can prevent it. Sanchez has also worked with the Teddy Atlas Foundation through which he met Aiden Binkley, a terminally ill 11-year-old struck with rhabdomyosarcoma. Sanchez developed a bond with Binkley and the two remained close friends until Binkley's death in December 2010.

Sanchez's father is a fire captain for the Orange County Fire Authority and a member of the national urban search and rescue team. In college, Nick Sanchez played quarterback for East Los Angeles College and was later a sergeant in the United States Army. His two older brothers both played college football. Nick Jr. attended Yale University, where he played quarterback while Brandon attended DePauw University, where he played on the offensive line. Nick Jr. went on to attend the USC Law School and is a business attorney; Brandon became a mortgage broker.

Sanchez dated model Hilary Rhoda for several years. The two appeared in a GQ photo shoot. On May 28, 2023, Sanchez married actress Perry Mattfeld.

In June 2016, a lawsuit filed by U.S. Securities and Exchange Commission alleged that Sanchez's broker conducted a "ponzi-like scheme" which defrauded Sanchez, as well as former MLB pitcher Roy Oswalt and then active MLB pitcher Jake Peavy, out of US$30 million.

=== 2025 stabbing and arrest ===
On October 4, 2025, Sanchez was stabbed during an altercation in downtown Indianapolis at 12:30 a.m. EDT. Reports indicate that he was rushed to a local hospital, where he was reportedly in critical condition. Released photos show a large gash across the cheek of the truck driver with whom Sanchez was alleged to have had an altercation. Sanchez was later arrested, initially on charges of battery with injury, unlawful entry of a motor vehicle and public intoxication, all misdemeanors. The next day, the battery charge was upgraded to a felony.

According to police reports, Sanchez was harassing a 69-year-old worker disposing restaurant grease into a truck. Though the man pepper sprayed him, Sanchez continued threatening the man, leading to his stabbing. Local news organizations released images of the other man suffering from his own injuries in the altercation. Sanchez was in Indianapolis to cover the Colts' game against the Las Vegas Raiders for Fox Sports the following day; Brady Quinn, another former NFL quarterback turned college football studio analyst for the network, was brought in to replace him after the incident. In November 2025, Fox confirmed Sanchez was fired.

=== Mexican-American identity ===
"Some people wanted me to be the Latino quarterback. Some people wanted me to be the USC quarterback who happens to be Latino. [I decided to] just be me and do my best with everything and not try to be something I'm not."

— Sanchez on the challenge of being a role model

When Sanchez was elevated to prominence at USC, he found himself a symbol of Mexican-American identity and a role model for younger generations. Sanchez was placed on center stage in Los Angeles, home to more than 4.6 million Hispanics, the majority of whom are of Mexican descent. While there had been previous, successful Mexican-American quarterbacks such as Tom Flores, Jim Plunkett, Joe Kapp, Jeff Garcia, Tony Romo, and Marc Bulger, unlike most of his predecessors, Sanchez is a third-generation, full Mexican and none had been embraced to the extent Sanchez was. USC fans began playing up Sanchez's ethnicity by wearing items such as sarapes, lucha libre masks, and homemade "¡Viva Sanchez!" T-shirts. His rise to fame within the Mexican-American community was compared to that of boxer Oscar De La Hoya and baseball pitcher Fernando Valenzuela.

While starting for an injured John David Booty in 2007, Sanchez wore a custom mouthguard that featured the colors of the Mexican flag in honor of his heritage. It became a prominent issue after a nationally televised game against Notre Dame. The mouthpiece became a symbol for two opposing viewpoints: for Mexican-Americans, it was a symbol of unity—Sanchez accepting his heritage; for critics, the gesture symbolized a radical political statement. Sanchez, who was born and raised in the United States, received hate mail urging him to return to Mexico. Sanchez responded to the controversy stating, "It's not a Mexican power thing or anything like that. It's just a little bit of pride in our heritage. Hopefully, it inspires somebody and it's all for the best." Overwhelmed by the attention and shying away from politics, Sanchez stopped wearing the mouthpiece, but began participating in other efforts to help the Hispanic community.

Sanchez, who knew how to speak some Spanish but was not fluent, began to take Spanish lessons during his junior year at USC so he could have conversations without the use of a translator. The USC band played "El Matador" when Sanchez would come onto the field. Sanchez participated in a fundraiser to help provide school supplies to first-graders in the city of Long Beach and region of South Bay, and helped Mayor Antonio Villaraigosa give holiday gifts to impoverished families. By the end of his USC career, he had been hailed as a role model for Hispanic youth. Sanchez serves as the Ambassador to the Inner-City Games Los Angeles, an after-school program that provides "at-risk youth" with positive, alternative activities. ESPN Radio came to an agreement with the Jets to broadcast all of the team's regular season games in 2011 on 710 ESPN Radio in Los Angeles. The agreement came about due to Sanchez's continued popularity in California.
