= The Conspiracy Chronicles =

Studio album by Tangerine Circus
- Released: 1 July 2015
- Recorded: June 2013 – December 2014
- Studio: LM Studios, Mexico City
- Genre: Progressive metal, progressive rock
- Length: 80:14
- Label: Independent
- Producer: Eduardo Mariné

Tangerine Circus chronology
Urania (2015)	The Conspiracy Chronicles (2015)	A Brief Encounter With Myself (2018)

Professional ratings
Review scores
Source	Rating
The Rocktologist	4/5 stars
PowerPlay Magazine	7/10 stars

The Conspiracy Chronicles is the second studio album by Mexican progressive rock band Tangerine Circus. The album, named after the former name of the band, and featuring a cover illustration resembling an old story book drawing by Francisco Messeguer, was recorded from June 2013 to December 2014 and released on 1 July 2015. It was produced, mixed and mastered by the band's keyboardist Eduardo Mariné and released in 2015 on digital stores.

The Conspiracy Chronicles narrates diverse aspects of a dystopian society with a manipulative and controlling government. Though the album does not narrate a story, each song explore the concepts of loss of humanity caused by technological advances, society's apathy towards government, loss of faith, and human transcendence through art.

== Background ==
In 2009, the band changed their name to Tangerine Circus and began to work on their first songs. Those songs would later on become their debut album Urania. During 2010, composition began for their second album, The Conspiracy Chronicles. To pursue this new material, the band began the search for a fifth member, a full-time singer, but with little success. In 2012, with Naoki Sasamoto on lead vocals, the band began recording the first version of The Conspiracy Chronicles, but due to low budget and rush of the process, it ended up being a demo for the upcoming final version recorded a couple of years later. Finally, Sasamoto left the band late 2012, leading to all original members taking over vocal duties, each one of them performing lead vocals on different songs.

== Recording ==
In early 2013, Mariné proposed that their two first musical efforts were re-recorded in his newly founded studio, LM Studio. With the band self-producing its own work and Mariné being in charge of engineering and mixing, Tangerine Circus reached a new level of control and detail with their work. It took them almost a year and a half to re-record and re-arrange their existing material into their final forms. "Advent of the Thinking", which was originally left out due to time constraints, was revisited by Messeguer and Mariné, being recorded and making into the final version of the album.

Through the recording process, the songs were revisited in their entirety by adding new vocal harmonies, textures and slightly modifying the existing structures of the songs. The recording process was completely digital, using amplifier simulators and sampling. Guitars were recorded through a GT-100 Roland module, while for bass and AmpliTube digital module was used. Different keyboards were used during the record of the album, such as Spectrasonics Omnisphere, Native Instruments, Roland Fantom G8 synthesizer, among others. Drums were recorded with an RMV kit, and a wide variety of Slate Digital triggers.

== Release ==
The Conspiracy Chronicles was first released digitally on streaming services and digital stores on 1 July 2015.

=== Packaging ===
In 2016, the album, along with Urania, was released as a two-disc set as a less expensive presentation to introduce their debut works to the public. The cover art of this set consists on Tangerine Circus's logo over a black background.

== Live performances ==
Although there was never an official tour of the album, the band gigged in Mexico City to promote the album. They played dates in State of Mexico and Querétaro, promoting also their debut release Urania. The Conspiracy Chronicles was played in its entirety for the first time on 14 October 2016, at Metal Brothers in Mexico City.

== Track listing ==
All music composed by Eduardo Mariné, Francesc Messeguer, Luis Mauricio Sánchez and Daniel Hernández, except where noted. All lyrics written by Mariné, except where noted.

No.	Title	Lead vocals	Length
1.	"The Chronicles Overture" (Sánchez)	Instrumental	3:20
2.	"Neohuman"	Mariné, Messeguer	6:43
3.	"Through Heaven"	Mariné, Messeguer	7:39
4.	"Lifestream"	Messeguer, Mariné, Sánchez	6:06
5.	"A Higher State of Mind"	Messeguer, Mariné	6:44
6.	"The Conspiracy" (lyrics: Mariné, Sánchez: "I. Overture"; "II. The Facts"; "III. Conspiracy Theory"; "IV. Unveiling The Shroud"; "V. Beneath Numbers"; "VI. The End of the Way)	Mariné, Messeguer, Sánchez	20:18: 4:18; 3:22; 4:10; 2:37; 4:22; 1:28
7.	"Spheres" (lyrics: Sánchez)	Messeguer, Mariné	6:04
8.	"Advent of the Thinking" (music: Mariné, Messeguer)	Instrumental	4:27
9.	"The Great Elector" (music: Messeguer)	Messeguer	4:14
10.	"The Memory Delusion"	Mariné, Messeguer, Sánchez	14:43
Total length:			80:14

2016 CD Release
No.	Title	Length
1.	"The Chronicles Overture"	3:20
2.	"Neohuman"	6:43
3.	"Through Heaven"	7:39
4.	"Lifestream"	6:06
5.	"A Higher State of Mind"	6:44
6.	"The Conspiracy"	20:18
7.	"Advent of the Thinking"	4:27
8.	"The Great Elector"	4:14
9.	"The Memory Delusion"	14:43
Total length:		74:10

== Personnel ==
Tangerine Circus

- Francesc Messeguer – lead guitar, vocals
- Luis Mauricio Sánchez – bass guitar, vocals
- Eduardo Mariné – Keyboards, vocals
- Daniel Hernández – drums, vocals

Production

- Eduardo Mariné – Production, engineering, mixing, mastering
- Francisco Messeguer – cover
