= After-School All-Stars =

U.S. non-profit organization

- Abbreviation: ASAS
- Formation: 2002; 24 years ago
- Type: Youth organization
- Legal status: Non-profit organization
- Headquarters: Los Angeles
- Location: Nationwide
- Region served: United States
- CEO: Ben Paul
- Staff: 2,989
- Website: www.afterschoolallstars.org

After-School All-Stars (ASAS) is a national non-profit organization that partners with schools across the United States to expand the learning day for low-income children. It provides free after-school programs to over 118,000 students at school sites, summer camps, and more recently also community centers, public housing, and shelters in 78 cities across the country.

== History ==
In 1991, ASAS founder Arnold Schwarzenegger was invited to serve as Executive Commissioner of the Inner City Games (ICG) by Daniel Hernandez of the Hollenbeck Youth Center. ICG was a citywide health and fitness program designed to help at-risk youth develop self-esteem and a sense of personal value. ICG inspired the creation of the Inner City Games Foundation (ICGF) in 1992.

Between 1992 and 2000, ICGF expanded to 15 additional cities across the country. ICGF transformed its model to provide after-school programming that was offered every day of the school year, supplemented with additional summer programming. In 2003, ICGF was renamed After-School All-Stars to reflect the significant enhancement of programming and holistic approach to extended-day learning.

ASAS currently serves over 118,000 low-income, at-risk youth who attend Title I schools in 78 cities across the country: Atlanta, Chicago, Columbus, Dallas, Dayton, Honolulu, Las Vegas, Los Angeles, Miami, New York, Orlando, San Antonio, San Diego, San Francisco, and Toledo. 92% of ASAS students are a minority, 90% qualify for the Federal Free and Reduced Lunch Program (see National School Lunch Act). Together they championed a national effort found through the Inner-City Games Foundation established in 1995

== Program details ==
=== Introduction to the program ===
Students involved with ASAS do not have to pay any fees. ASAS focuses its effort on Title I schools. These are schools where "50% of students qualify for the Federal Free and Reduced Lunch Program". ASAS has 674 school sites, and summer camps, in 78 cities across the United States.

=== Target demographic ===
ASAS primarily serves children at the middle school level because it is usually the most neglected age group for after school programs. Most middle school students do not have the luxury of daycare services or after school activities and are often left with few to none safe activities to engage in after school from 3 pm-6pm. Several studies have shown that if students are left alone and on their own during these hours, they are more likely to experience an increase in delinquent behavior and become involved with substance use and high-risk sexual behavior.

As of 2022, After School All Stars has served 118,068 underprivileged children in America. Fifty percent of students served are reported as in either K-8 or elementary school, thirty-five percent are in middle school, ten percent are in high school, with an additional three percent being served by the housing authority and two percent being served at other sites. Ethnicity demographics include African-Americans at fifty percent, Latine and Hispanic communities at thirty percent, Caucasians at eight percent, Asian-Americans at five percent, native Hawaiian and Pacific Islander communities at three percent and other communities at four percent.
