= Urania (album) =

Studio album by Tangerine Circus
- Released: 21 May 2015
- Recorded: June 2013– December 2014
- Studio: LM Studios, Mexico City
- Genre: Progressive metal, progressive rock
- Length: 58:03
- Label: Independent
- Producer: Eduardo Mariné

Tangerine Circus chronology
Urania (2015)	The Conspiracy Chronicles (2015)

Professional ratings
Review scores
Source	Rating
ProgArchives	3.96/5 stars
The Rocktologist	4/5 stars

Urania is the debut studio album by the Mexican progressive rock band Tangerine Circus. The album, named after the former name of the band, and featuring a cover image consisting on blue and yellow fractals by Marco del Moral Argumedo, was recorded from June 2013 to December 2014 and released on 21 May 2015. It was produced, mixed and mastered by the band's keyboardist Eduardo Mariné and released in 2015 on digital stores.

== Background ==
Keyboardist Eduardo Mariné, drummer Daniel Hernández and bassist Luis Mauricio Sánchez met in middle school in 2005, starting a friendship in a short period of time. They shared a common love for bands like Dream Theater and Iron Maiden, which lead to the formation of their first band when they were at age 17, mainly playing covers of some artists they used to listen like Mägo de Oz and Iron Maiden. Guitar player Daniel Moreno, Sánchez long-time friend, joined the band, which would be later named Metalurgia, which served as an early musical output for the musicians. In 2008, Hernández and Mariné decided they wanted to bring it up a notch and create a progressive metal project in the vein of bands like Symphony X and Dream Theater, parallel to Metalurgia. Guitarist Francesc Messeguer, Hernández long-time friend, became part of this band, and a couple of months later Sánchez would also join the new progressive metal path, naming the project Urania, which would later become the title of their debut album.

== Recording ==
In 2009, the band changed their name to Tangerine Circus and began to work on their first songs. Those songs would later on become Urania, excluding "Into Her Traveling Mind", which was written almost 4 years later. In early 2013, Mariné proposed that Urania got re-recorded in his newly founded studio. With the band self-producing its own work and Mariné being in charge of engineering and mixing, Tangerine Circus reached a new level of control and detail with their work. It took them almost a year and a half to re-record and re-arrange their existing material into their final forms. "Into Her Traveling Mind", the opening song from Urania, was composed during that time due to a lack of a heavy and exciting opening for the record.

"The Wings", the longest song on the album and composed of four parts, is slightly based on the Greek myth of Icarus.

== Release ==
Urania was first released digitally on streaming services and digital stores on 21 May 2015.

=== Packaging ===
In 2016, the album, along with The Conspiracy Chronicles, was released as a two-disc set as a less expensive presentation to introduce their debut works to the public. The cover art of this set consists on Tangerine Circus's logo over a black background.

== Live performances ==
Although there was never an official tour of the album, the band gigged in Mexico City to promote the album. They played dates in State of Mexico and Querétaro, promoting also their next release The Conspiracy Chronicles.

== Track listing ==
All music composed by Eduardo Mariné, Francesc Messeguer, and Daniel Hernández, except where noted. All lyrics written by Mariné, except "A Passage Through My Past Life" written by Mariné and Hernández.

No.	Title	Lead vocals	Length
1.	"Into Her Traveling Mind" (Mariné, Messeguer, Luis Mauricio Sánchez, Hernández)	Instrumental	5:34
2.	"Cycle of Madness"	Mariné, Sánchez, Messeguer	7:58
3.	"Rushing Dreams"	Mariné, Messeguer, Hernández	6:48
4.	"Neverending Love"	Hernández, Messeguer, Mariné	6:12
5.	"The Wings: "I. Learn To Fly"; "II. Hang Gliding"; "III. The Fall"; "IV. Violent Landing"	Mariné, Messeguer, Hernández, Sánchez	19:27: 7:30; 7:36; 2:21; 2:00
6.	"A Passage Through My Past Life"	Mariné, Messeguer, Hernández	12:07
Total length:			58:03

== Personnel ==
Tangerine Circus

- Francesc Messeguer – lead guitar, vocals
- Luis Mauricio Sánchez – bass guitar, vocals
- Eduardo Mariné – Keyboards, vocals
- Daniel Hernández – drums, vocals

Production

- Eduardo Mariné – Production, engineering, mixing, mastering
- Marco del Moral Argumedo – cover
