= Daniel L. Hernandez =

Founder of the Inner-City Games

Danny Hernandez
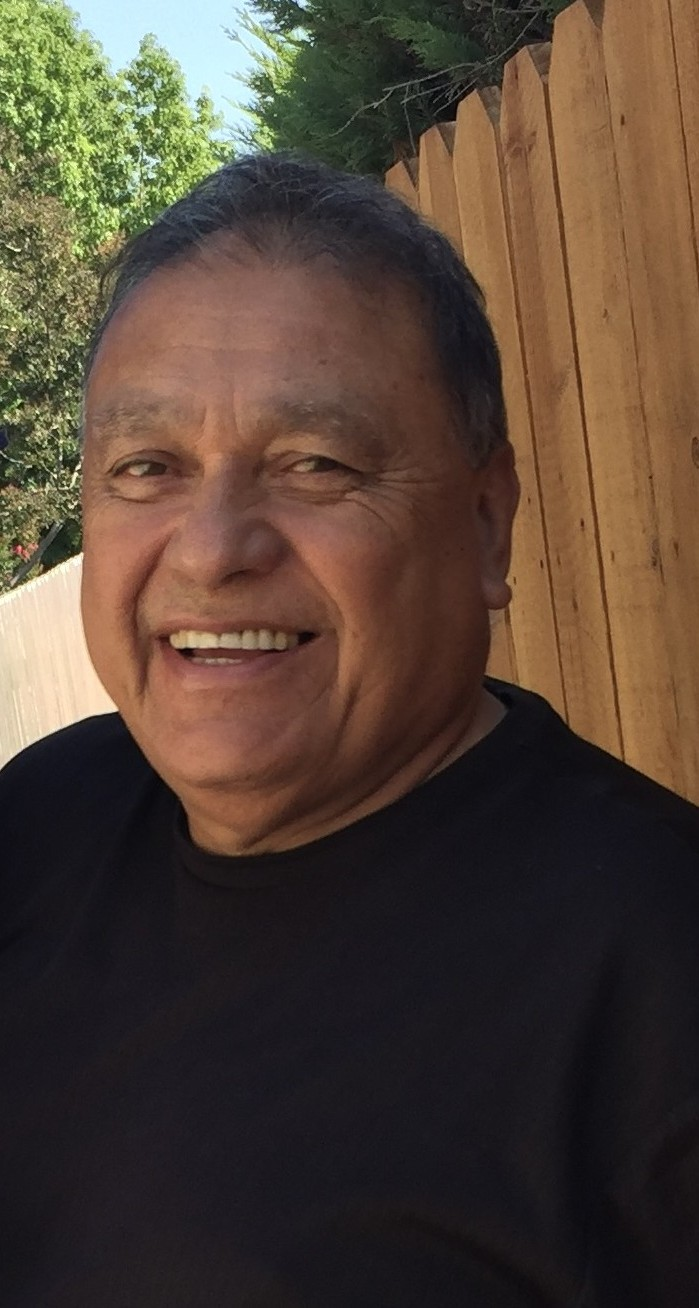
- Born: Daniel L. Hernandez
- Citizenship: American
- Education: California State University, Los Angeles
- Awards: Silver Star

Daniel L. Hernandez, also known as Danny, is the CEO of the Hollenbeck Youth Center and founder of the Inner-City Games, which was later renamed After-School All-Stars. He is a U.S. Marine Corps veteran with military honors and has been recognized for his work as a mentor and community leader.

Hernandez has also received the titles "Mr. Motivator" and "Bario Buddy" from the LA Times, and appeared on Spectrum News 1's In Focus in April 2018.

== Early life and education ==
Hernandez grew up with his mother, younger brother, and sister after his father left when he was four years old. He graduated from Roosevelt High School in Boyle Heights in 1965 and went on to graduate California State University, Los Angeles.

== Career ==
=== Vietnam war ===
At the age of 20, Hernandez served as a machine gunner in M Company, 3rd Battalion, 1st Marine Regiment, 1st Marine Division. He was deployed to Quảng Ngãi province during Operation Utah and completed his service in Vietnam in the late 1960s.

According to Military.com, Hernandez's Marine Corps Lieutenant commanding officer recommended him for the Silver Star. In 2005, upon reuniting with Hernandez, his commanding officer learned that the award had never been granted. He subsequently spent several years gathering evidence across the United States, making calls and requesting help from public officials to get Hernandez the medal. In 2009, General John F. Kelly presented Hernandez with the Silver Star during a ceremony in Los Angeles. Hernandez's supporters are advocating for his Silver Star to be upgraded to the Medal of Honor.

=== Hollenbeck Youth Center ===
In 1980, Hernandez became Executive Director of the Hollenbeck Youth Center, which had been established in 1972 following a series of riots in East Los Angeles. The number of children and teenagers using its gymnasium, boxing ring, or weight room had increased from about 1,000 to 6,000 annually. In 1984, the center introduced an annual fundraising luncheon honoring the Dodgers. By 1993, an expansion had been planned to double the gym's size, enabling the center to expand its sports and educational programs.

=== Inner-City Games ===
In 1991, Hernandez established the Inner-City Games, in countywide youth service competition, and scholarship program. In 1995, he co-founded the Inner-City Games Foundation with Arnold Schwarzenegger. Participants in these events have included public figures from various fields, such as Maria Shriver, Tom Arnold, Danny Glover, Cardinal Roger Mahony, Jay Leno, Muhammad Ali, Dax Shepard, and Oscar De La Hoya.

== Books ==
- Hernandez, Danny (2018). Hernandez, Priscilla (ed.). Silver Star: An American Story. Bocaj Publishing. ISBN 978-0999800720.

== Awards ==
Hernandez was awarded the Silver Star during a ceremony held in Los Angeles in 2009.

== Personal life ==
Daniel Hernandez is married to Beatrice, and they have a daughter named Priscilla.

== See also ==
- Vietnam war
