= Tangerine Circus =

Mexican progressive rock band

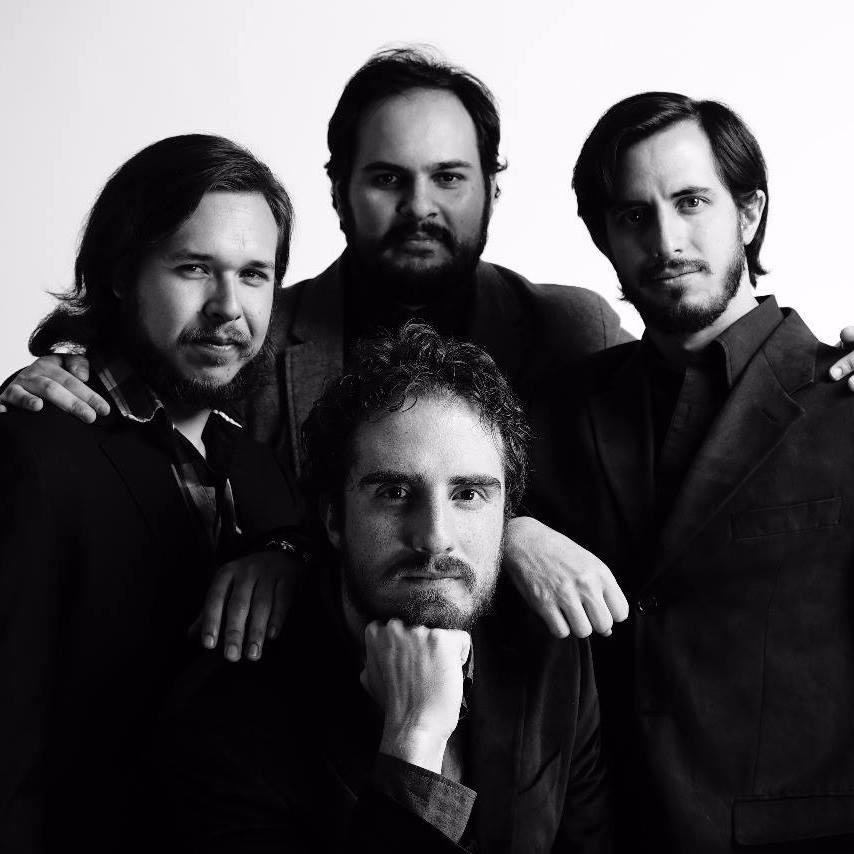

Background information
- Origin: Mexico City, Mexico
- Genres: Progressive rock; progressive metal
- Years active: 2009–present
- Members: Eduardo Mariné; Francesc Messeguer; Luis Mauricio Sánchez; Daniel Hernández
- Website: www.tangerinecircus.com

Tangerine Circus is a Mexican progressive rock band from Mexico City, Mexico. They evolved from a metal-oriented style in their early years, to become one of Mexico's most promising progressive acts of the 2010s.

== History ==
=== Origins (2006–2009) ===
Keyboardist Eduardo Mariné, drummer Daniel Hernández and bassist Luis Mauricio Sánchez met in middle school in 2005, starting a friendship in a short period of time. They shared a common love for bands like Dream Theater and Iron Maiden, which lead to the formation of their first band when they were at age 17, mainly playing covers of some artists they used to listen like Mägo de Oz and Iron Maiden. Guitar player Daniel Moreno, Sánchez long-time friend, joined the band, which would be later named Metalurgia.

Metalurgia served as an early musical output for the musicians, so in 2008 Hernández and Mariné decided they wanted to bring it up a notch and create a progressive metal project in the vein of bands like Symphony X and Dream Theater, parallel to Metalurgia. Guitarist Francesc Messeguer, Hernández long-time friend, became part of this band, and a couple of months later Sánchez would also join the new progressive metal path, naming the project Urania, which would later become the title of their debut album.

=== Tangerine Circus, first works and demos (2009–2012) ===
In 2009, the band changed their name to Tangerine Circus and began to work on their first songs. Those songs would later on become their debut album Urania, excluding "Into Her Traveling Mind", which was written almost four years later. There were several live shows done during this time, which consisted mainly of cover songs and occasionally some of the new songs, such as "Cycle of Madness" and "The Wings".

During 2010, the band began writing new songs for what would become their second album, The Conspiracy Chronicles. In order to pursue this new material, the band began the search for a fifth member, a full-time singer, but with little success. In 2012, with Naoki Sasamoto on lead vocals, the band began recording the first version of The Conspiracy Chronicles, but due to low budget and rush of the process, it ended up being a demo for the upcoming final version recorded a couple of years later. Finally, Sasamoto left the band late 2012, leading to all original members taking over vocal duties, each one of them performing lead vocals on different songs.

=== First releases: Urania and The Conspiracy Chronicles (2013–2016) ===
In early 2013, Mariné proposed that their two first musical efforts were re-recorded in his newly founded studio. With the band self-producing its own work and Mariné being in charge of engineering and mixing, Tangerine Circus reached a new level of control and detail with their work. It took them almost a year and a half to re-record and re-arrange their existing material into their final forms. "Into Her Traveling Mind", the first song from Urania, was composed during that time due to a lack of a heavy and exciting opening for the record. Also, "Advent of the Thinking", an instrumental from the second album, which was originally left out due to time constraints, was revisited by Messeguer and Mariné, being recorded and making into the final version of the album. The band released the new version of Urania digitally on 21 May 2015, and the new version of The Conspiracy Chronicles on 1 July 2015.

In 2016, the band finally got around into releasing the first CD version of their two albums independently; a double disc containing Urania and The Conspiracy Chronicles. Due to time constraints in the CD version, "Spheres" was left out of The Conspiracy Chronicles, available only as a free download from their website.

=== A Brief Encounter With Myself (2016–present) ===
During late 2016, the band began writing material for their upcoming third album, which is posed to be released sometime during late 2017. On 26 August, the band published a post on their website announcing that the album was completed and on 22 December, the band formally announced the album would be called 'A Brief Encounter With Myself', its full tracklist and a very special concert to take place on 3 February to showcase new music alongside Agora, one of Mexico's most important progressive rock acts.

== Musical style ==
=== Influences ===
Musical background for Tangerine Circus comes primarily from progressive rock and metal, collectively consisting of bands such as Dream Theater, Iron Maiden, Porcupine Tree and King Crimson. Nevertheless, individual influences of other genres, such as funk and electronic music, help deeper define the band's sound.

In their website, each of them lists their five favorite albums:

Francesc Messeguer

- Genesis – Duke
- Marillion – Misplaced Childhood
- Iron Maiden – Dance of Death
- Hans Zimmer – Interstellar OST
- Peter Gabriel – Up

Lalo Mariné

- Dream Theater – Six Degrees of Inner Turbulence
- Joe Hisaishi – Joe Hisaishi in Budokan
- Thrice – The Alchemy Index
- BT – This Binary Universe
- Steven Wilson – Grace for Drowning

Luis Mauricio Sánchez

- Beardfish – Sleeping in Traffic
- The Cure – Bloodflowers
- Jamiroquai – A Funk Odyssey
- King Crimson – The Power to Believe
- Moon Safari – Lover's End

Daniel Hernández

- Dream Theater – Images and Words
- Dream Theater – Six Degrees of Inner Turbulence
- Angra – Temple of Shadows
- Iron Maiden – Piece of Mind
- Symphony X – The Odyssey

=== Characteristics ===
Prog magazine described their music as "a veritable Narnia of progressive sub-genres."

== Members ==
=== Current members ===
- Francesc Messeguer – vocals, guitars (2008-2024, 2025–present)
- Eduardo Mariné – vocals, keyboards, synthesizers and piano (2008–present)
- Luis Mauricio Sánchez – vocals, bass, guitars (2008–present)
- Daniel Hernández – drums, vocals (2008–present)

=== Former members ===
- Naoki Sasamoto – lead vocals (2012)

== Discography ==
Studio albums

- Urania (2015)
- The Conspiracy Chronicles (2015)
- A Brief Encounter With Myself (2018)
