= Inner-City Games =

American youth athletic competition

The Inner-City Games were founded by Daniel Hernandez of the Hollenbeck Youth Center in 1991 as a way to build self-confidence, self-reliance, and camaraderie among inner-city youth. The Games began in East Los Angeles with more than 40,000 youths competing in athletic and academic competitions. In the wake of the LA riots in 1992, Hernandez envisioned the Games expanding citywide and engaged Arnold Schwarzenegger to be the Games' executive commissioner.

In 1995, the National Inner-City Games Foundation was established, having expanded to 15 cities across the United States and involved more than one million young people across the country. In 2003, the Inner-City Games was renamed to After-School All-Stars, but in Los Angeles they remained the Inner-City Games.
