= Daniel Sui =

Chinese American geographer

Daniel (Dan) Sui

Senior Vice President and Chief Research & Innovation Officer of Virginia Tech
- Incumbent
- Assumed office November 1, 2020
- Preceded by: Don Taylor (Interim)

Vice Chancellor for Research & Innovation at the University of Arkansas – Fayetteville
- In office October 1, 2018 – October 30, 2020
- Preceded by: Jim Rankin
- Succeeded by: John English

Division Director for Social & Economic Sciences at the U.S. National Science Foundation
- In office July 1, 2016 – September 30, 2018
- Preceded by: Jeryl Mumpower
- Succeeded by: Daniel Goroff

Personal details
- Born: Dianzhi Sui; June 1, 1965 (age 61)
- Spouse: Feng Xu
- Education: Peking University (BS, MS),University of Georgia (PhD)
- Website: www.research.vt.edu

Daniel Sui is a Chinese American geographer/GIScientist and currently serves as the senior president and chief research & innovation officer at Virginia Tech. Sui previously served as vice chancellor for research & innovation at the University of Arkansas – Fayetteville and division director for social & economic sciences at the U.S. National Science Foundation.

== Education ==
Sui earned his B.S. with Highest Honors in Geography (majored in Geomorphology and Quaternary Geology) in 1986 and M.S. in Geographic Information Science (GIScience) in 1989, both from Peking University. He got his Ph.D. in geography (focusing on GIS-based spatial analysis and modeling) from the University of Georgia in 1993.

== Current research and major contributions ==
Despite increasing administrative and leadership responsibilities, Sui has kept his research and teaching active up to the present. He has published over 260 refereed journal articles and book chapters, he has also authored/co-authored a dozen books, edited volumes, and covered a variety of topics, ranging from GIS for Homeland Security, Crowdsourcing Geographic Knowledge Production, to Human Dynamics in Smart and Connected Communities, Mapping COVID-19 in Space and time. Sui is considered to have made multiple contributions to theoretical foundations of geographic information science, new methodologies to study cities and environmental issues, understanding the emerging paradigms in geographic thoughts, promoting convergence of geographical research, and setting the agenda for research reproducibility and replicability in geography and beyond. He is currently working on projects related to seamlessly integrating space and place to conduct holistic geographic analysis with the goal of espousing a new quantum turn in geography and GIScience.

== Career ==
Sui's entire academic career since 1989 has been with public land-grant universities in the U.S. except during his sabbaticals serving as a visiting senior research scientist at the U.S. Centers for Disease Control and Prevention (CDC) in Atlanta (2007), the United Nations’ Food and Agricultural Organization (FAO) in Rome, Italy (2000/2001), and a visiting professor at University of California, Santa Barbara, California (2001).

=== Texas A&M ===
Immediately after his Ph.D. in 1993, Sui was offered a tenure-track assistant professor position in the Department of Geography at Texas A&M, where he received early tenure and promotion in 1997, an endowed chair in 2001, and a promotion to full professor in 2002. While at TAMU, Sui served as Geography's graduate program director (1997-1999) and assistant vice president for research & director for geospatial information science and technology (2004-2009).

=== The Ohio State University ===
In 2009, Sui was recruited by the Ohio State University to run the Center for Urban and Regional Analysis (CURA) – a position he held until 2012. Sui served as Chair of Geography at OSU between 2011 and 2015. Sui was a distinguished professor of social & behavioral sciences between 2009 and 2015, and an arts & sciences distinguished professor between 2015 and 2018.

=== The U.S. National Science Foundation ===
Between 2016 and 2018, Sui was on loan to the federal government from OSU [through the Intern-governmental Personnel Act (IPA)] to serve as division director for social & economic sciences at the U.S. National Science Foundation.

=== University of Arkansas – Fayetteville ===
Between 2018 and 2020, Sui served as vice chancellor for research & innovation and institutional director for Arkansas Biosciences Institute at the University of Arkansas – Fayetteville. He was also a distinguished professor of geosciences at the University of Arkansas.

=== Virginia Tech ===
Sui was appointed as vice president for research & innovation in Fall 2020 and was promoted to senior vice president and chief research & innovation officer one year after. At Virginia Tech, Sui is also a professor of geography and internal & public affairs. During his first 18 months at Virginia Tech, Sui has focused on expanding research development support efforts for all researchers at VT, launching the new research frontier areas to guide VT's institutional investment, reorganizing and streamlining the operation of the Research and Innovation Office, and working with all stakeholders to seek a 360-degree partnership to increase VT's extramural research funding to address the multiple challenges facing humanity today.

== Major Honors, Awards, and Recognitions ==
Sui received multiple national and international recognitions for research and teaching accomplishments, including the 2019 CPGIS distinguished scholar award, 2015 Woodrow Wilson Public Policy scholar, 2014 Distinguished Scholar Award of the AAG Regional Development and Planning Specialty Group, Michael Breheny Best Paper Prize, 2009 Guggenheim Fellow, 2004 AT&T Fellow, and 2014 Google Fellow. He is also a recipient of two university-level outstanding teaching awards and the best paper for college-level teaching by the U.S. National Council for Geographic Education (NCGE).
