= Daniel Langhorne =

English antiquarian

- Died: 10 August 1681
- Occupation: Antiquarian

Daniel Langhorne (died 10 August 1681) was an English antiquarian.

== Biography ==
Langhorne was a native of London. He was admitted to Trinity College, Cambridge, on 23 October 1649, and became a scholar there. He graduated B.A. in 1653–4, and M.A. in 1657. He became curate of Holy Trinity, Ely, and on 17 March 1662 the bishop granted him a license to preach in that church and throughout the diocese (Kennett, Register and Chron. p. 884). He was elected a fellow of Corpus Christi College, Cambridge, in 1663, and proceeded to the degree of B.D. in 1664, when he was appointed one of the university preachers. On 3 September 1670 he was instituted to the vicarage of Layston, with the chapel of Alswyk, Hertfordshire, and consequently vacated his fellowship in the following year (Clutterbuck, Hertfordshire, iii. 484). He held his benefice till his death on 10 August 1681 (Baker MSS. xxii, 318).

His works are:

1. 'Elenchus Antiquitatum Albionensium, Britannorum, Scotorum, Danorum, Anglosaxonum, etc.; Origines et Gesta usque ad annum 449, quo Angli in Britanniam immigrarunt, explicans,' London, 1673, 8vo, dedicated to William Montacute, attorney-general to Queen Catherine. 2. 'Appendix ad Elenchus Antiquitatum Albionensium: Res Saxonum et Suevorum vetustissimas exhibens,' London, 1674, 8vo. 3. 'An Introduction to the History of England, comprising the principal affairs of this land from its first planting to the coming of the English Saxons. Together with a Catalogue of British and Pictish Kings,' London, 1676, 8vo. 4. 'Chronicon Regum Anglorium, insignia omnia eorum gesta ... ab Hengisto Rego primo, usque ad Heptarchiæ finem, chronologicè exhibens,' London, 1679, 8vo, dedicated to Sir Joseph Williamson, secretary of state. A beautifully written manuscript by Langhorne, entitled 'Chronici Regum Anglorum Continuatio, a rege Egberto usque ad annum 1007 deducta,' belonged to Dawson Turner (Cat. of Dawson Turner's MSS. 1859, p. 107).
