= Daniel Spencer-Tonks =

English rugby league footballer (born 1995)

Dan Spencer-Tonks
Personal information
- Full name: Daniel Spencer-Tonks
- Born: 18 January 1995 (age 31) Gloucester, Gloucestershire, England

Playing information
- Position: Second-row, Centre
Club
Years	Team	Pld	T	G	FG	P
2022	Salford Red Devils	1	0	0	0	0
2023	Whitehaven RLFC	6	3	0	0	12
2023(loan)	→ Rochdale Hornets	3	0	0	0	6
2023(loan)	→Hunslet RLFC	0	0	0	0	0
2024	Swinton Lions	0	0	0	0	0
2024	Rochdale Hornets	10	0	0	0	0
2025–	Whitehaven RLFC	0	0	0	0	0
	Total	20	3	0	0	18
- Source: As of 9 June 2025

Daniel Spencer-Tonks is an English professional rugby league footballer who plays for Whitehaven RLFC in the RFL League 1.

== Playing career ==
=== Salford Red Devils ===
In September 2022 Spencer-Tonks made his Salford debut in the Super League against the Warrington Wolves.

=== Swinton Lions ===
On 23 October 2023 it was reported that he had signed for Swinton in the RFL Championship.

=== Rochdale Hornets ===
On 12 June 2024 it was reported that he had signed for Rochdale in the RFL League 1 on a one-year deal.

On 21 November 2024 it was reported that he had left Rochdale alongside seven others departing the club.

=== Whitehaven RLFC (re-join) ===
On 9 June 2025 it was reported that he had signed for Whitehaven RLFC in the RFL League 1

== Doping ban ==
Spencer-Tonks served a four year ban from 2015 to 2019 for an anti-doping rule violation after testing positive for stanozolol.
