= Daniel Devereux =

American philosopher

Education
- Education: St. John's College (BA), University of Chicago (MA, PhD)

Philosophical work
- Era: 21st-century philosophy
- Region: Western philosophy
- Institutions: University of Virginia
- Main interests: ancient Greek philosophy

Daniel T. Devereux (active September 1970 – present) is an American philosopher and Professor Emeritus of Philosophy at the University of Virginia. Devereux is known for his works on ancient Greek philosophy. A festschrift in his honor titled Wisdom, Love, and Friendship in Ancient Greek Philosophy (edited by Georgia Sermamoglou-Soulmaidi and Evan Robert Keeling) was published in 2021.

== Books ==
- Encyclopedia of Classical Philosophy, Greenwood Press, Westport, 1997
- Biologie et metaphysique chez Aristotle, Editiona du CNRS, Paris, 1990
