= Cervelas de Lyon =

French sausage

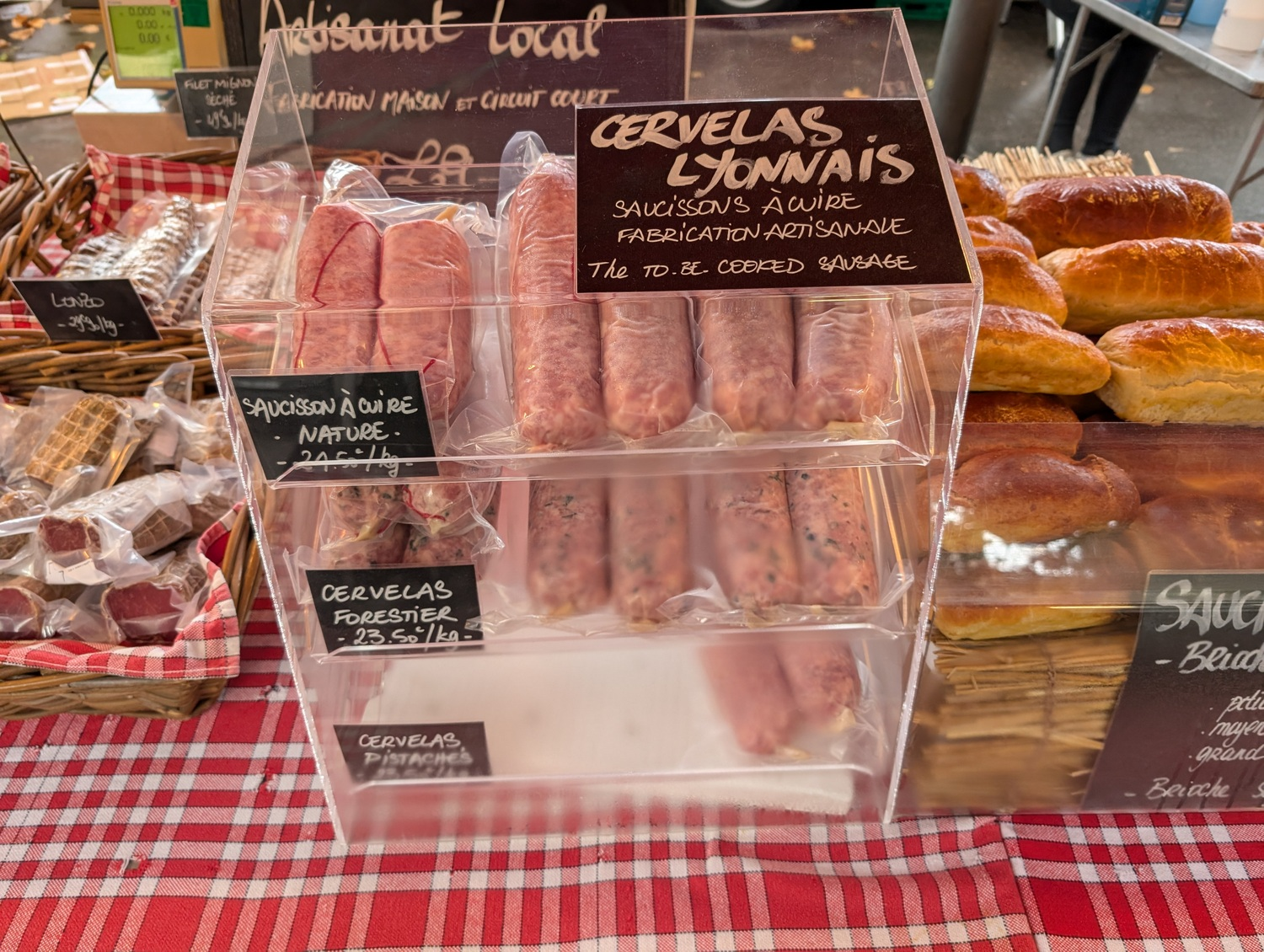
traditional saucisse at the Food and Flower Market Saint Antoine Célestins in Lyon

Cervelas de Lyon is a sausage that is among the specialties of Lyonnaise cuisine.

The sausage contains finely minced pork and either truffles or pistachios. Sold uncooked, the sausage has to be boiled before it is eaten.

== Summary ==
There are many varieties of Lyon sausages that have come of age with recipes handed down by the ancestors of the pork butchers from the city of the Gauls. Among these, some are dry, both small and large, called the rosette or Jésus.

The local sausages of Lyon are, however, made to be cooked. One of the sausages, the cervelas, is produced short and fat with prime pork stuffing with either pistachios or truffles. It derives its name from brains, since it was initially made from pork brains. On the other hand, the sabodet, with its coarser texture, comes from Isère and is made from pork head, rind, and meat.

== See also ==
- Cervelat
- Lyonnaise cuisine
