= Lyonnaise cuisine =

Cooking traditions in Lyon, France

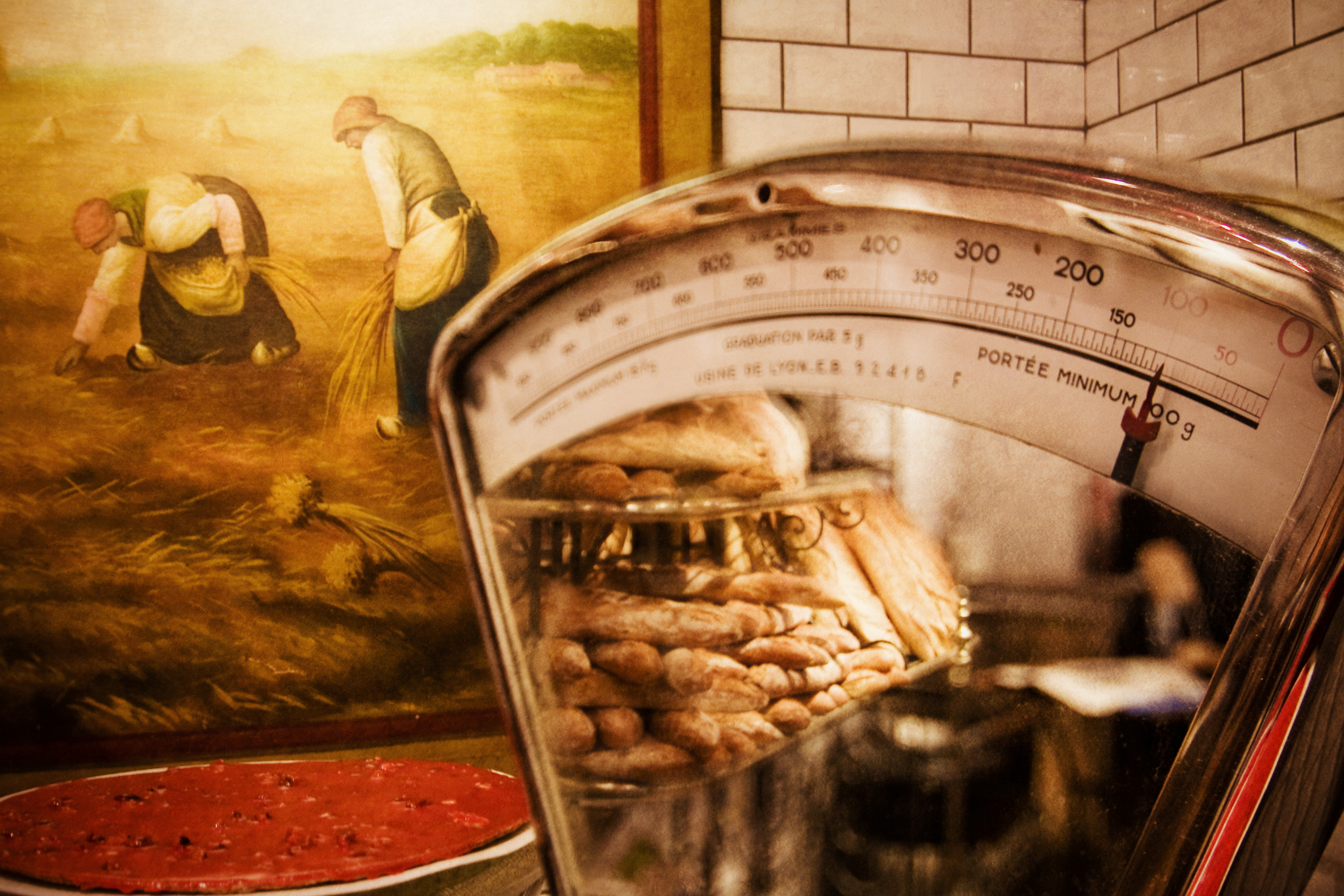
Pink praline at the Halles de Lyon-Paul Bocuse

Lyonnaise cuisine refers to cooking traditions and practices centering on the area around the French city of Lyon and historical Lyonnais culinary traditions.

Lyonnaise cuisine became a crossroads of many regional culinary traditions. Among ingredients from neighboring places are summer vegetables from farms in Bresse and Charolais, game from the Dombes, lake fish from Savoy, spring fruits and vegetables from Drôme and Ardèche, and wines from Beaujolais and the Rhone Valley.

In the 19th century, middle-class women, nicknamed the "Lyonnaise mothers", left their homes to work as cooks and created new culinary traditions incorporating their regional roots. Part of this legacy can be seen in the numerous Bouchon restaurants around the city centre of Lyon.

In 1935, the food critic Curnonsky described the city of Lyon as the "world capital of gastronomy".

== History ==
=== Antiquity ===
The history of Lyon cuisine begins in antiquity at Lugdunum, the capital of the Three Gauls monopoly on the wine trade. Oil and brine were imported from Africa and the south of Spain. The wine trade was well-documented even before the arrival of Roman settlers in the region: trade in wine during the 2nd century AD is known to have occurred in the alluvial plain of the Vaise. Italian wines from the Tyrrhenian coast were also present.

A new population of Roman settlers brought Mediterranean flavors, new products and new food habits: the wines of Italy gave way to Greek wines, from Rhodes, from Cnidus, from Kos, and also wine from Chios, reputed to be the most expensive and luxurious wine. During the 1st century AD, wine from further places arrived, like wine from Crete and the Levant. At the end of the 2nd century AD, wines from other parts of Roman Gaul arrived.

It was not until the 3rd and 4th centuries that wine from more exotic locations like Tunisia arrived. Septimanus was a well-known cook from Lugdunum, who has been documented in historical texts. He had an inn on the site of the present Rue Saint Helena and was renowned for cooking pork and game birds properly.

=== Renaissance ===
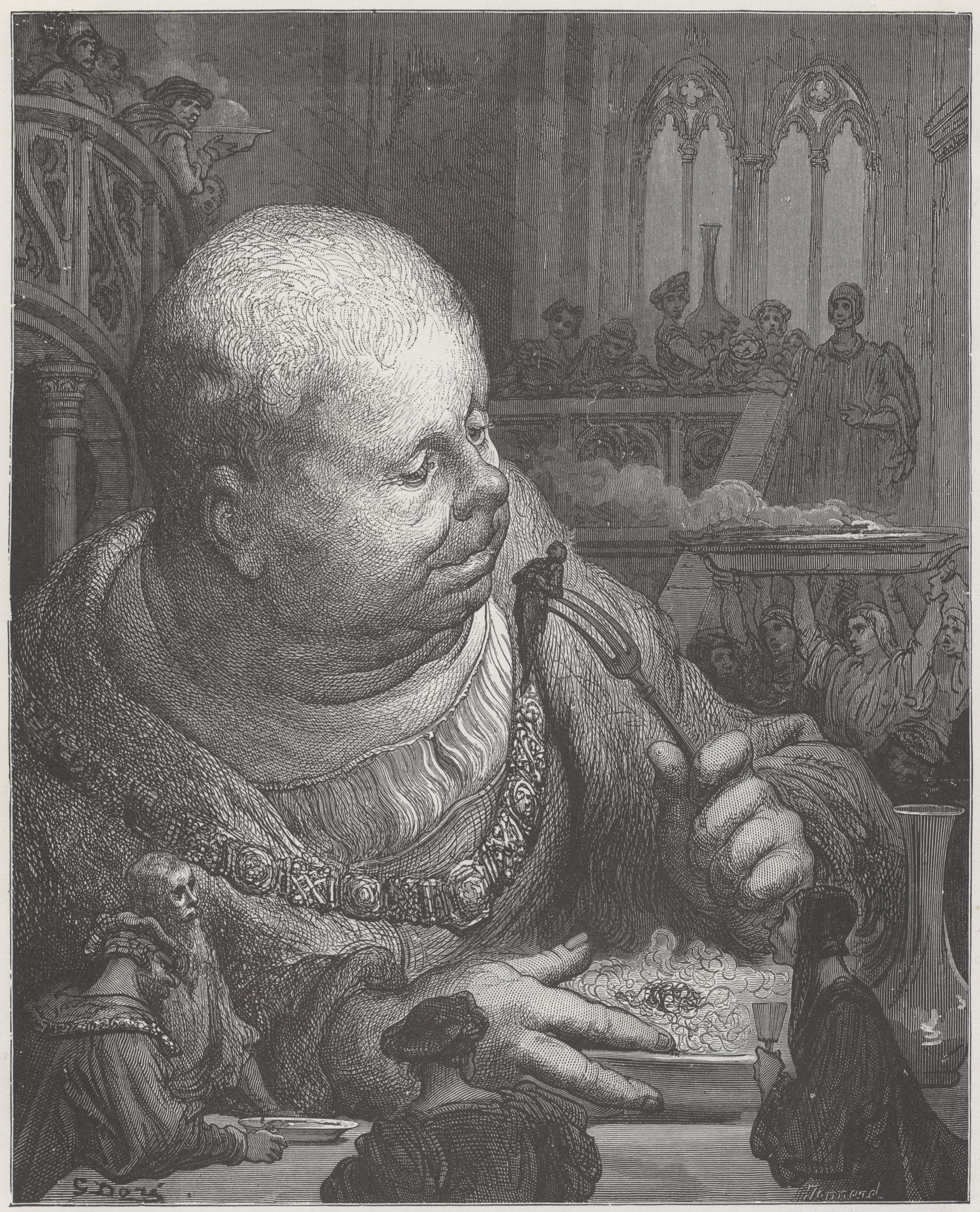
Gargantua and "Pilgrims eaten in salads," illustration Gustave Doré, 1873.

During the Renaissance, there was a distinction between so-called "bourgeois" cuisine and the more common cuisine of the lower classes. This "lower class cuisine" made heavy use of offal, deemed "cheap cuts", as immortalized by writer François Rabelais at the beginning of his novel Gargantua. In the story, Gargamelle gave birth to her son Gargantua after eating a great amount of "skewered tripe", or grand planté de tripe in French.

The first edition of Pantagruel, another novel by Rabelais, published in Lyon in 1532 before Gargantua, is inspired by the adventures of a comedic doctor who is said to be inspired by the Lyonnaise comportment. The book evokes Lyonnaise cuisine, citing a list of dishes: "sausage, sausage, ham, sausages, huge wild boar roasts with garlic sauce, pluck, fricandeau, fat capons in white Mangier, hochepots, beef stew, cabirotades, hastereaux, game animals and birds, stuffed lamb, stuffed carp, whitefish, annealed (cheese flavored with peach leaves), crackers and macaroons (dry cakes), fruit jellies, fritters, and so on".

Erasmus, a Renaissance humanist, hired many chefs from the city of Lyon: "It is better at home than when we are at a hotel in Lyon… the Lyonnaise mother comes first to greet you, begging you to be happy and to accept food.” The city had specialized in the preparation of certain foods, as evidenced even in place names: rue de la Fromagerie (Cheese Shop Street), rue Poulaillerie (Poulterer Street), rue Mercière (Merchant's Street).

=== 18th century to present ===
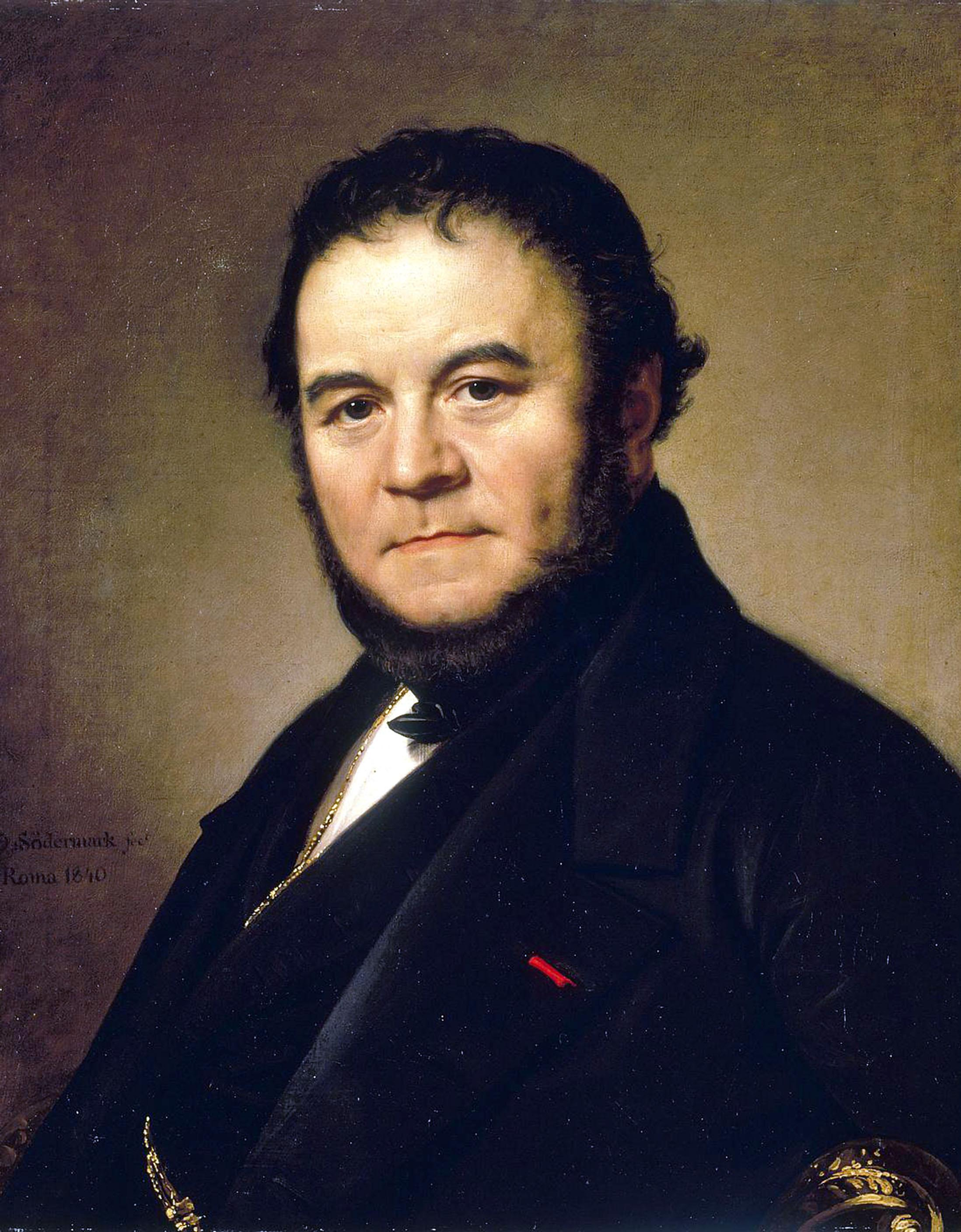
The author Stendhal.

It was in the eighteenth century that ice cream was introduced to Lyon by an Italian, Spreafico. The modern culinary reputation of Lyon was truly born with the publication of a poem by Joseph de Berchoux, glorifying the local cuisine. He was born in Roanne in 1760, and moved to Lyon in 1770. His work, Gastronomie ou l'homme des champs à table, which was translated into several languages, introduced the idea of "eating well" in French culture and dispersed the new word "gastronomy".

It precedes the works of Jean Anthelme Brillat-Savarin and Alexandre Balthazar Laurent Grimod, which would later perpetuate Berchoux's praise of the art of eating well. This "art" would become a specific middle-class characteristic of French society in the nineteenth century. The poem reads:

"Want to succeed in the art I profess?
Have a good castle in Auvergne or Bresse
Or rather places near Lyon sees passing
Two rivers lovers ready to embrace;
Will you get this under favorable sky
Everything that can serve the sweets table."

A book by Amable Leroy, La cuisinière bourgeoise, published in 1783, invented and immortalized recipes that would make Lyonnaise cuisine famous. In the last years of the eighteenth century the first modern-style restaurants would appear, some of which still exist today. There is Déduit, located at the top of rue Romarin, known for its calf's head specialty. It was also during this period that the Lyonnaise mothers would appear. They were master charcutières, or meat-cutters in English. The first to open a shop was Mother Brigousse, in 1759. She became famous for preparing and cutting Pike.

In 1816, the poet Joanny Carmouche, a member of the Epicurean Society of Lyon brought together gourmets with verse:

"The desserts are eaten,
Cutlery line up,
Women arrange ...
At the dock, it happens
A marmot absconds

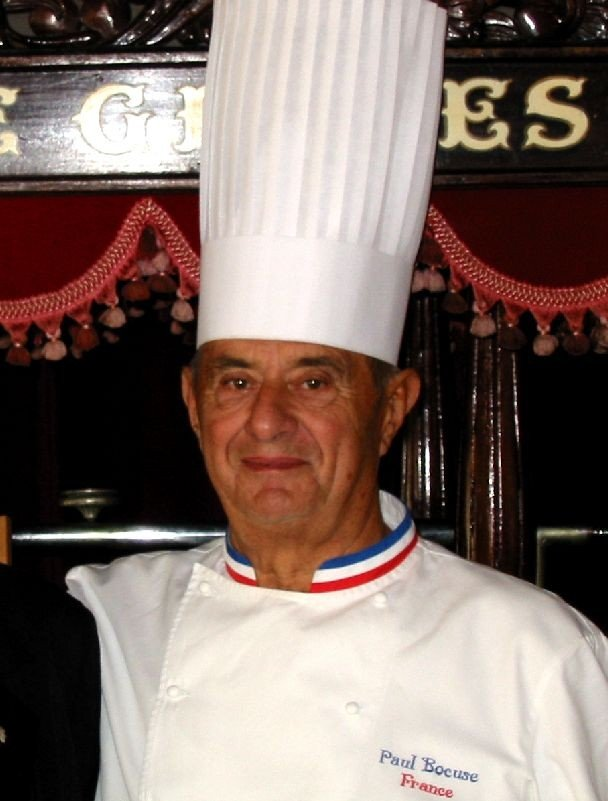
Chef Paul Bocuse

(Without paying the bill!)
Far from River
The working class
Roast chicken ...
But each request:
What is this band
Bacchus order?
- They are rascals
Fleeing the river
Who, then, in River
Every month will be
Epicureans."

Stendhal, passing through Lyon in 1837, evoked Lyonnaise cuisine:

"I know one thing that is done very well in Lyon. One eats admirably well there, and in my opinion, better than in Paris. Vegetables especially are divinely prepared. In London, I learned that there are twenty-two species of potatoes, in Lyon, I saw twenty-two different ways to prepare them, and at least twelve of these are unknown in Paris".

The Lyonnaise mothers become so famous that the gourmet Maurice Edmond Sailland, usually known as Curnonsky, who had spent several weeks each winter in Lyon declared in 1934 from the Vettard restaurant that Lyon was the "capital of gastronomy". The statement came during the golden era of Lyonnaise cuisine, involving people with feathers and gastronomes and the idea spread and soon became one of the components of the image that Lyon will give their city. Curnonsky reasoned that Lyon's cuisine reflects the values of the local society, including its simplicity, as it appears in the speech of Paul Bocuse: "It is this honesty, this taste of the measure, I like to find in an honest and healthy Lyonnaise dish".

Bernard Poche, in his book Lyon tel qu'il s'écrit. Romanciers et essayistes lyonnais 1860-1940, or Lyon, as written: Lyonnais novelists and essayists 1860–1940, concluded that eating well affected all layers of the population of the city. In the nineteenth century, the puppet Guignol, the famous weaver, often finds its parts by the prospect of a "hoary stew", a good meal, while novels use, or scoff at the legendary delicacy of bourgeois Lyon.

== Terroirs and culinary influences ==
As a result of Lyon's geographical location, many different culinary influences have converged in the city's cuisine, particularly those of the South (Provence and the Mediterranean) and of the North (Alsace and Lorraine). Each cuisine imparts its own characteristics: the use of butter and cream from the North and of fresh vegetables and olive oil from the South. In addition, in the fifteenth century, Lyon served as one of the primary distribution centres for spices imported from the East by Italian merchants.

There are a number of terroirs around Lyon whose farmers supply their products to the city. To the north of Lyon lies Charolais, whose cattle breeders provide beef, while the fishermen of the Saône River deliver whitebait. The wine-producing region of Beaujolais is also located to the north of Lyon. According to French writer and journalist Léon Daudet,"[there] are three reasons why Lyon is the capital of French gastronomy. . . . The third is that in addition to the Saône and the Rhône, she is served by a third river, the Beaujolais, which never dries up and is never muddy."

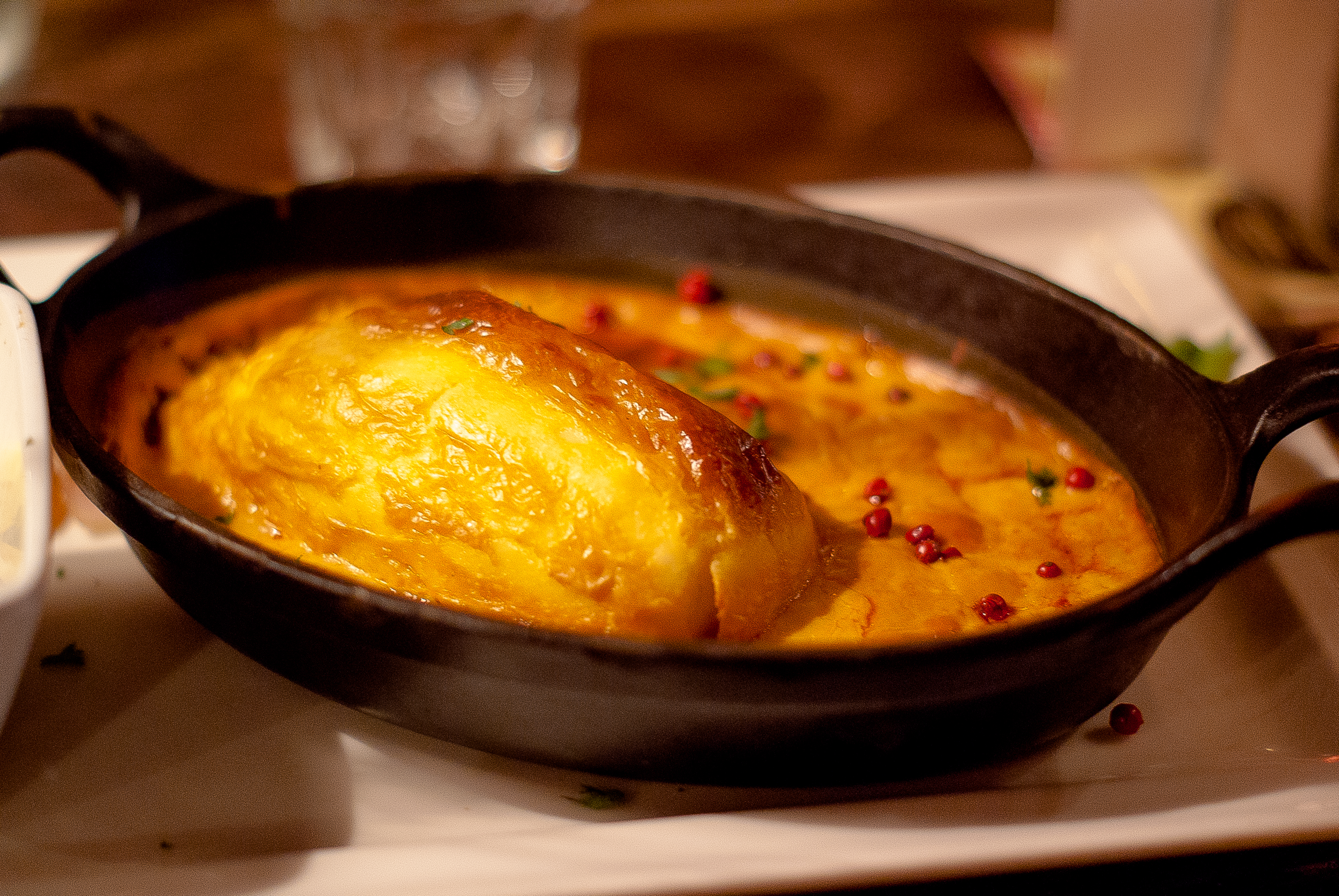
Quenelle in Nantua Sauce

Located north-east of Lyon, the region of Bresse supplies poultry, the appellation d’origine contrôlée (En: controlled designation of origin) of which dates to 1957. Bresse also supplies gaudes, corn used to make soupe de farine jaune (En: corn flour soup). The neighbouring region of Bugey provides wine as well as crayfish, which are caught in the lac de Nantua (En: Nantua Lake) and are used as the base of the Nantua sauce that often accompanies quenelles. Frogs, along with several types of fish including carp, tench, roach, pike and zander, are also supplied by the Dombes, a glacier-gouged plateau made up of more than 1,000 ponds (sometimes referred to as lakes), the majority of which are man-made and were created during the Middle Ages.

The regions to the south of Lyon produce fruits, vegetables and wines in the Vallée du Rhône (En: Rhône Valley). In the Ardèche, a department in south-central France named after the Ardèche River, farmers continue to develop the cultivation of chestnuts, which are a key ingredient in the traditional French Christmas dish, turkey with chestnuts. The Dauphiné region, which is known for its pork products and cheeses such as the Saint-Felicien or the Saint-Marcellin, is also located to the south of Lyon as are the 48 communes that produce rigotte de Condrieu, ". . . a soft French goat cheese with a bloomy rind . . . [that] takes its name from the word ‘rigot’ (meaning small stream) and the town of Condrieu, 40 kilometers south of Lyon."

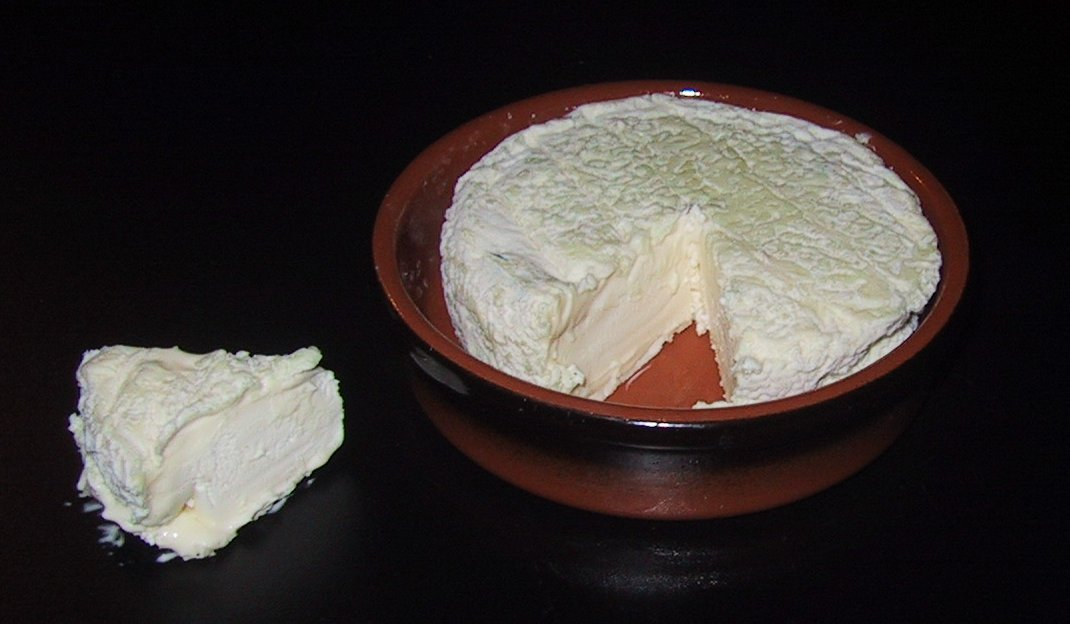
Saint-Felicien

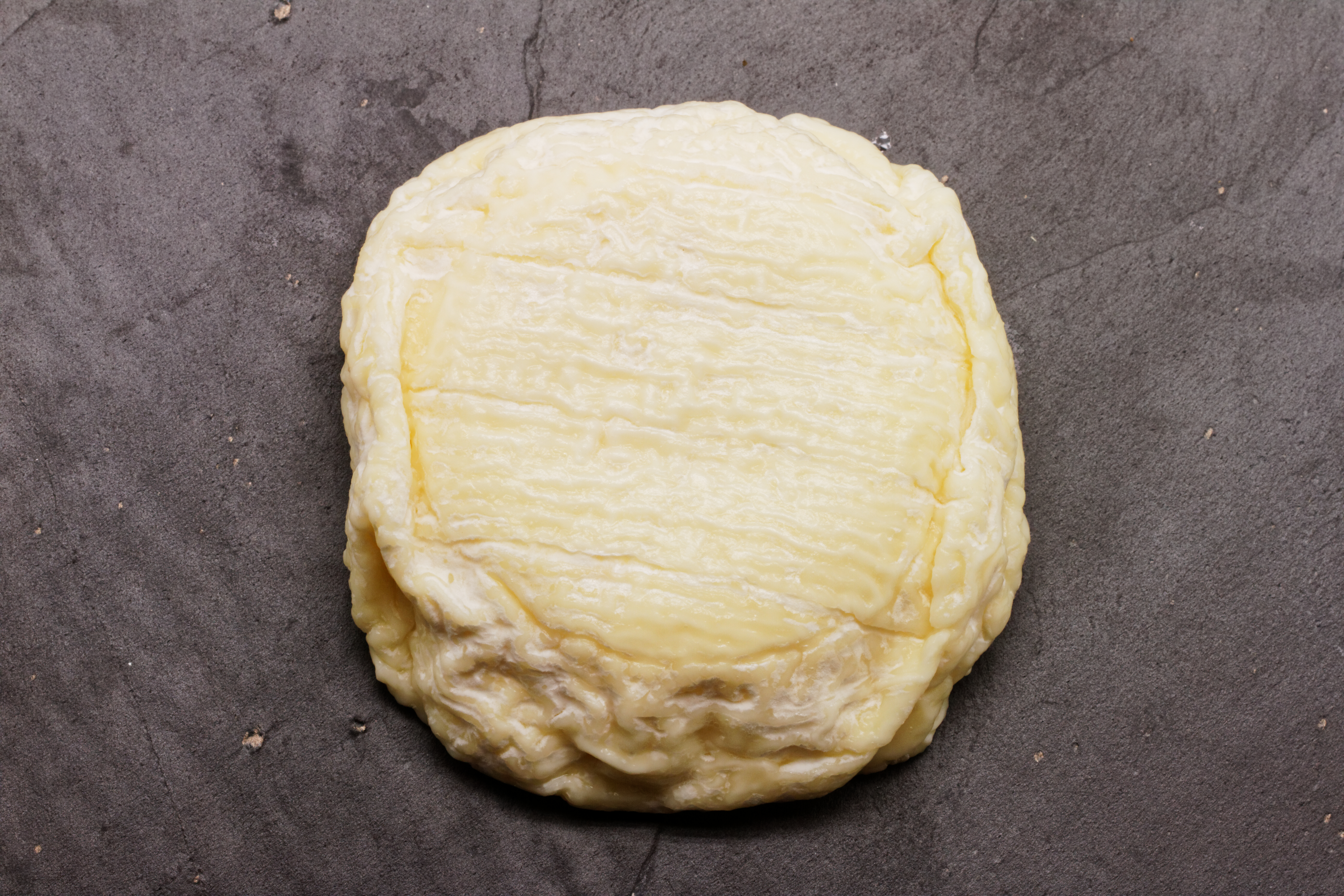
Saint-Marcellin

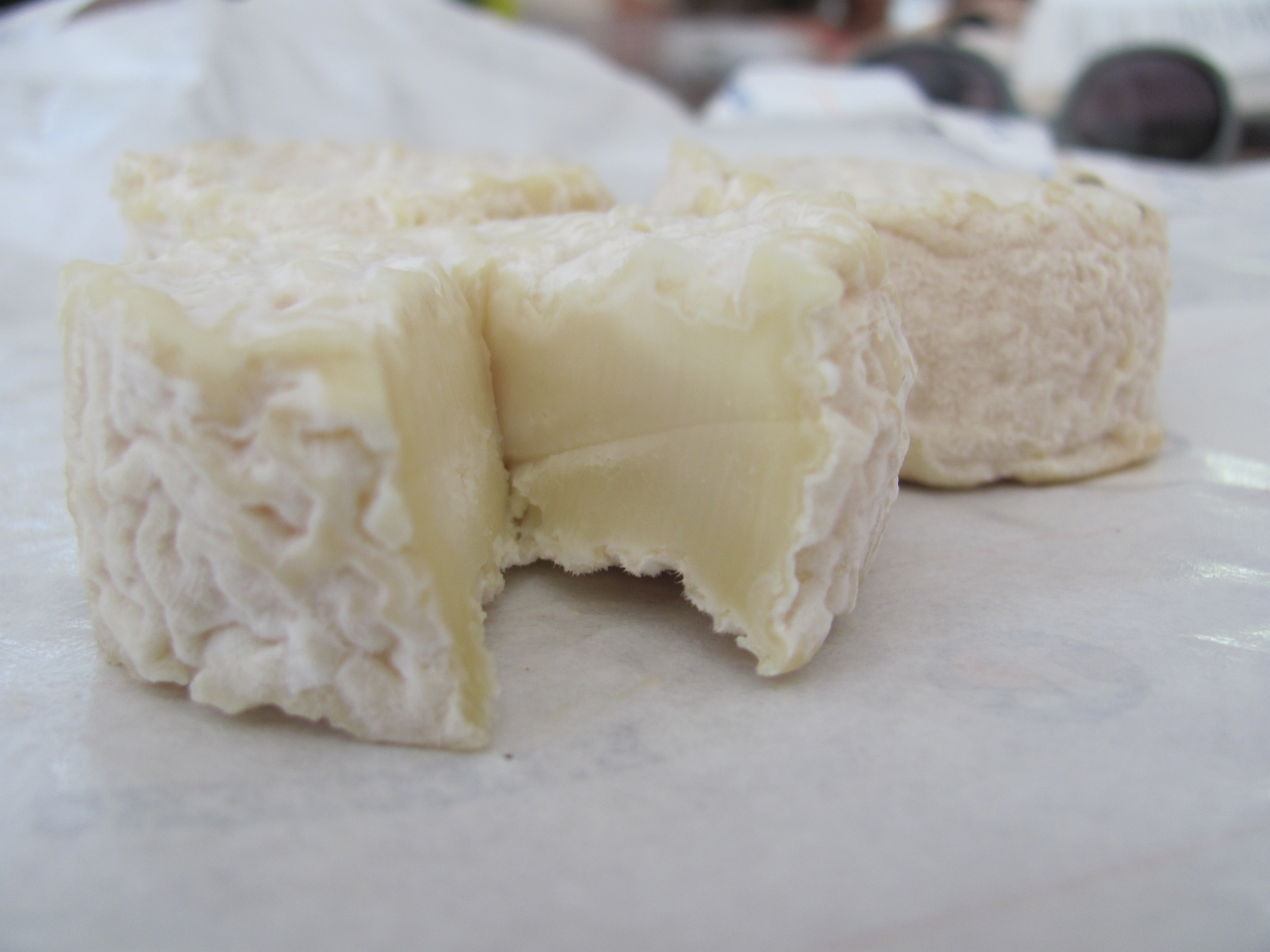
Rigottes de Condrieu

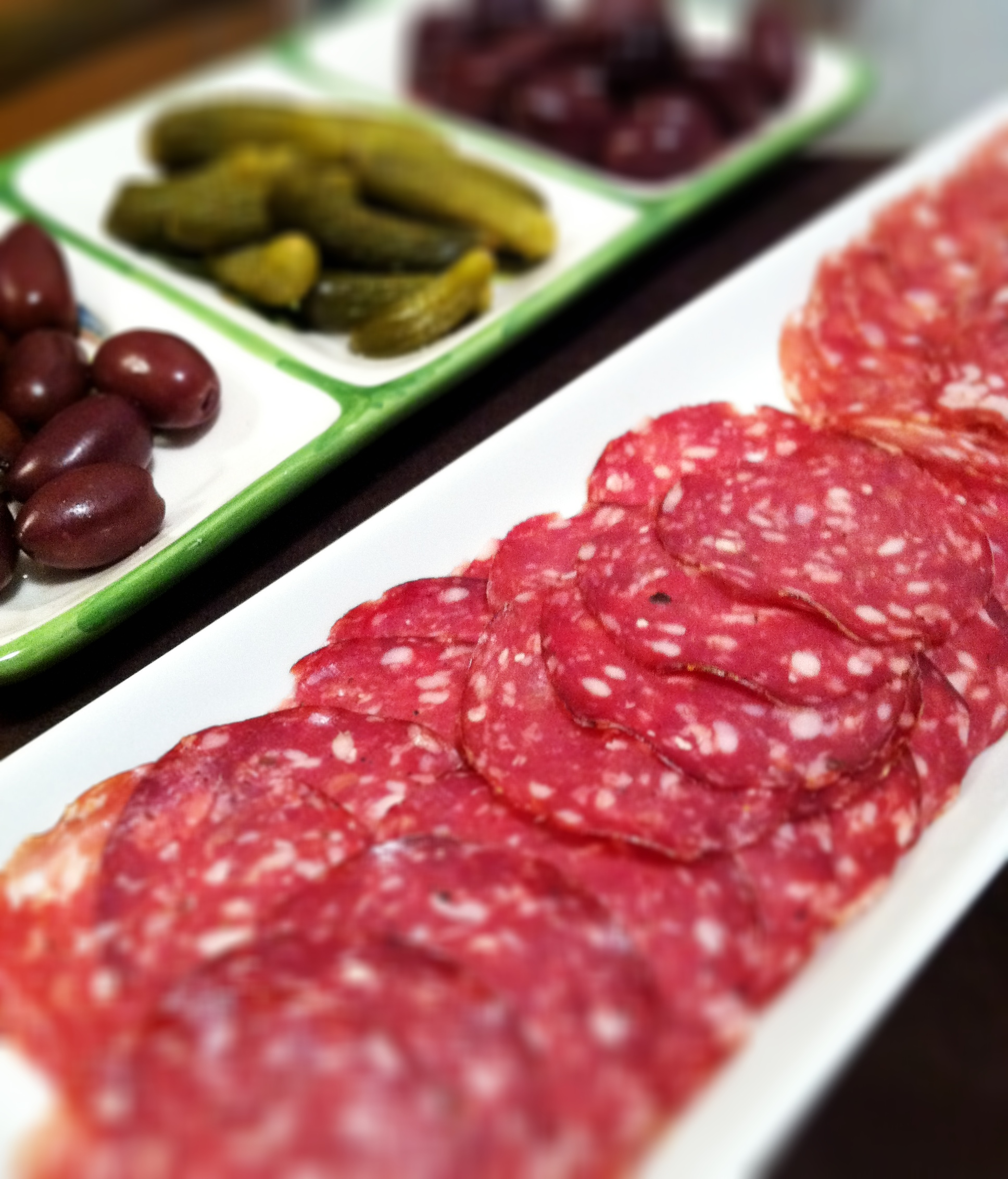
Rosette de Lyon

To the west of Lyon, the livestock farms of the Monts du Lyonnais (Lyonnais mountains) are the source of the charcuterie and salt meat known as cochonnailles lyonnaises as well as variety of other pork products including rosette de Lyon, a cured sausage named for its pink colour and made from pork shoulder, and jésus de Lyon, which is a "large, coarsely chopped, pure pork sausage studded with large pieces of fat [whose] plump shape resembles a swaddled baby."

These farmers also produce sausage, salami, pigs' trotters, ham, filet mignon, terrines, farmhouse pâté and pork rind (including fried pork rinds) as well as small artisanal cheeses or rigottes that are generally made of cow or goat milk. In addition, agricultural producers from this region, primarily market gardeners, are often present at the markets of Lyon. For instance, the French commune of Thurins calls itself the raspberry capital of France.

== Traditions ==
=== The Mères ===
The name Mères lyonnaises (French: [mɛʁ ljɔnɛz], lit. 'Mothers of Lyon') refers to the female cooks who gave birth to Lyon's current gourmet reputation. Their history was linked to the rise of automobile tourism, as promoted by the Michelin Guide, and the development of the city of Lyon under mayor Edouard Herriot. In the mid-19th century, these women of modest means, initially the cooks in large middle-class households in Lyon, decided to start their own businesses, serving dishes that mixed homemade and traditional cuisine. Many more women joined their numbers during the Great Depression, when they were let go from the wealthy households that employed them.

While starting out serving a client base of working-class people, such as journeymen, in this industrial city, the reputation of their meals soon spread to a much wealthier clientele. Celebrities, businessmen and politicians came to frequent these establishments despite the mixing of the social classes, particularly in the Golden Age of the Mères, during the Inter-War period. They offered a menu that was simple (four or five traditional dishes) yet refined enough to guarantee both culinary pleasure and a welcoming ambiance.

The first historical mention of a Mère dates back to Mère Guy in 1759. Located on the Rhône River in the Mulatière region, her self-named guinguette (lit. 'open-air restaurant') specialized in matelote d'anguilles, a dish of stewed eels in white/red-wine sauce.

A century later, her granddaughters, referred to as La Génie (lit. 'the Genius') and Maréchal, became the new face of Mère Guy, bringing back classic recipes, including their grandmother's stewed eels, the dish that "made the Mère Guy reputation." This reputation attracted honoured guests, including the Empress Eugénie on her annual visit to the thermal waters of neighbouring Aix-les-Bains.

Around this time (1830-1850), Mère Brigousse ran a restaurant in the Charpennes district of Lyon. One of her most popular dishes was Tétons de Vénus (lit. 'Venus' breasts'), large breast-shaped quenelles.

Mère Fillioux (Françoise Fillioux, 1865–1925) was the first Mère whose "reputation was known well beyond the limits of the city and region." She established a restaurant on 73 rue Duquesne, known for a simple, unchanging menu featuring her own culinary creations, such as volaille demi-deuil (En: fowl in half-mourning). The dish takes its name from her technique of cooking "a fattened hen with slivers of truffle inserted between skin and flesh. The alternating black and white appearance of the flesh explains the term ‘half mourning’, a period following the all-black dress of full mourning, when it was acceptable for widows to alternate black and white or grey clothing."

Specialities such as these, "turned out with such generosity and devotion to perfection...made her famous to gourmets the world over within her lifetime."

As early as the 1920s, Mère Bourgeois (Marie Bourgeois) was making a name for herself in the region. In 1933, she became one of the first women to receive 3 stars from the Michelin Guide for her restaurant in Priay, in the Rhône-Alpes department of Ain.

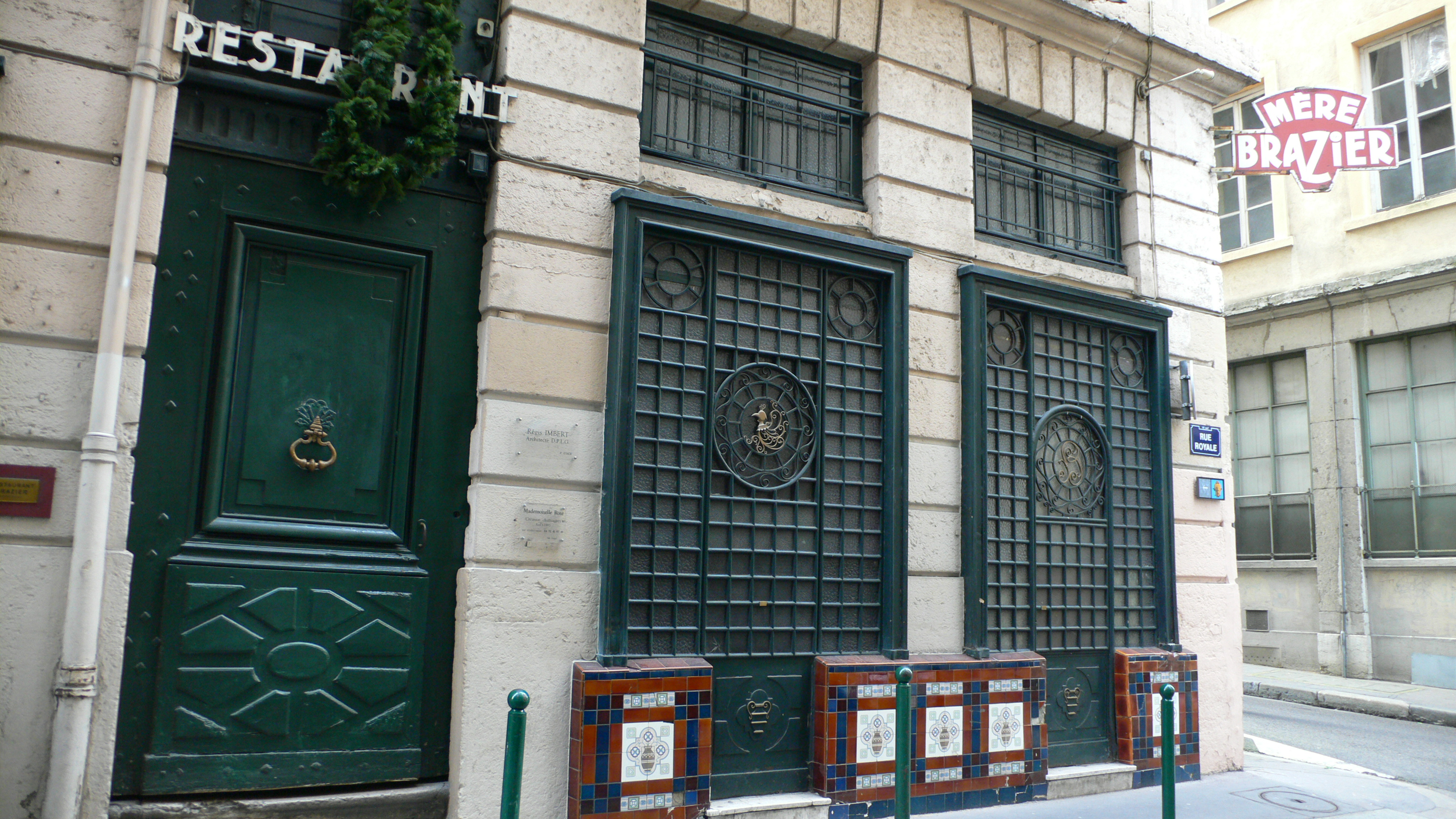
Facade of La Mère Brazier restaurant

Also in 1933, Mère Brazier (Eugénie Brazier, 1895–1977), "the highest achiever" of all the Mères, was awarded this distinction for both of her restaurants, one on 12 rue Royale and the other on Col de la Luère in Lyon, giving her a total of 6 stars. Trained by the renowned Mère Fillioux, she was "the first woman to receive [this many stars] for two restaurants simultaneously" and "rose to become Lyon's most renowned chef" of the time. Guests of Mère Brazier included the mayor, Edouard Herriot, and celebrities such as poet/screenwriter Jacques Prévert and singer Édith Piaf.

Paul Bocuse, a chef "more famous [in Lyon] than whoever happens to be mayor" and the longest-standing recipient of 3 Michelin stars (over 40 years), apprenticed under Mère Brazier. Bocuse attributes much of his success to those formative years, a sentiment echoed "by many of Lyon's great chefs" who received similar culinary training under les Mères.

Among these chefs is Alain Alexanian (L'Alexandrin restaurant and A Point Café), whose career began with an apprenticeship under Mère Castaing (Paulette Castaing), a two-time Michelin star recipient for her restaurant L'Ouest in Beau-Rivage, in the Condrieu region.

Chef Georges Blanc was similarly influenced by his grandmother Élisa, known as Mère Blanc, whose restaurant in Vonnas became the seat "of a veritable [family] dynasty of great chefs." In 1933, she was described as "the best cook in the world" by Curnonsky, a well-known food critic.

Other Mères include Mère Vittet, who established a restaurant near Lyon's Perrache train station, and Mère Léa, who ran La Voûte (En: the Vault) in Lyon's Place Antonin Gouju. Some of her dishes included tablier de sapeur (literally meaning sapper's apron - a dish of pan-fried tripe), macaroni gratin, and choucroute au champagne (an adaptation of choucroute garnie, "sauerkraut cooked and served with meat," usually "pork, sausages and often potatoes" made with Champagne instead of Riesling), for which she was awarded a Michelin star. Known as a woman who was quick to share her opinions (often quite loudly), Mère Léa would go to the Saint Antoine market each morning pushing a large cart with a sign that read "Attention! Faible femme, forte en gueule" (En: Beware! Weak woman, strong voice).

Still others include Mère Pompom, Mère Charles, La Grande Marcelle, Mère Jean, La Mélie, Mère Carron, Madame Andrée and Tante Paulette.

== Traditional dishes of Lyon ==
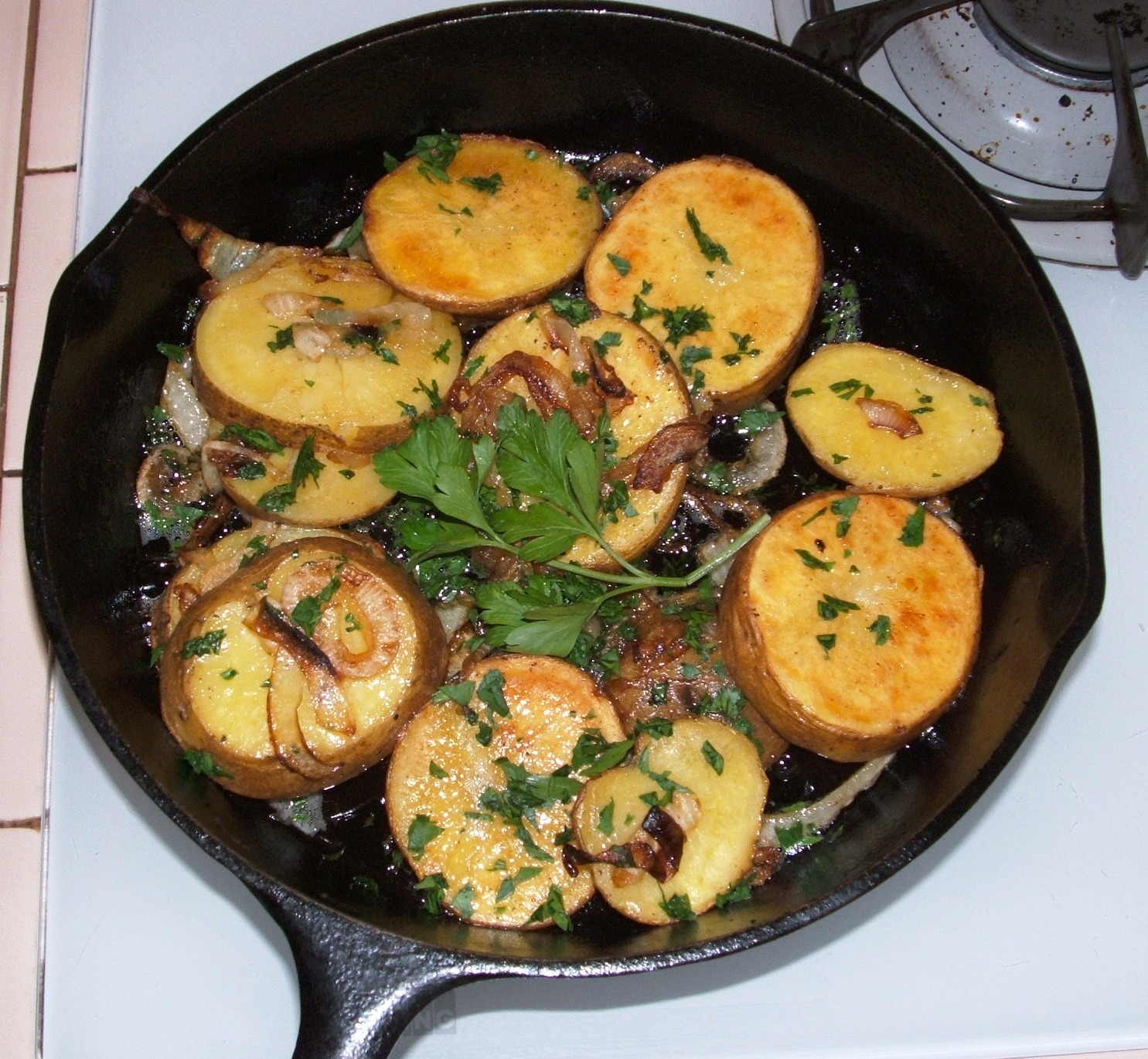
Potatoes lyonnaise

Regional wines are served at the bouchons of Lyon. The city is also famous for its morning snacks, formerly had by its silk workers. The mâchons, made up of local charcuterie, are usually accompanied by Beaujolais red wine. Traditional local dishes include:

- Rosette lyonnaise
- Saucisson de Lyon (sausage)
- Andouillette (a sausage of coarsely cut tripe)
- Saucisson brioché
- Gras double (tripe cooked with onions)
- Salade lyonnaise, lettuce with bacon, croûtons and a poached egg
- Marrons glacés
- Coussin de Lyon
- Cardoon au gratin.
- Cervelle de canut (lit. silk worker's brains) is a cheese spread/dip named for the "brain of the silkworker". The dish has a base of fromage blanc, seasoned with chopped herbs, shallots, salt, pepper, olive oil and vinegar.
- Lyonnaise potatoes
- Sauce lyonnaise
- Sabodet
- Tablier de sapeur
- Quenelle, a mixture of creamed fish, chicken, or meat, sometimes combined with breadcrumbs, with a light egg binding. Lyon and Nantua are famous for their quenelles de brochet (mousseline) (pike quenelles), often served with cream sauce and run under the salamander grill.
- Tacos lyonnais, fast food dish invented in the early 2000s
- Bugnes
- Praline rose

== See also ==
- French cuisine
- European cuisine
- Les Toques Blanches Lyonnaises
