= Sauce lyonnaise =

Sauce in French cuisine

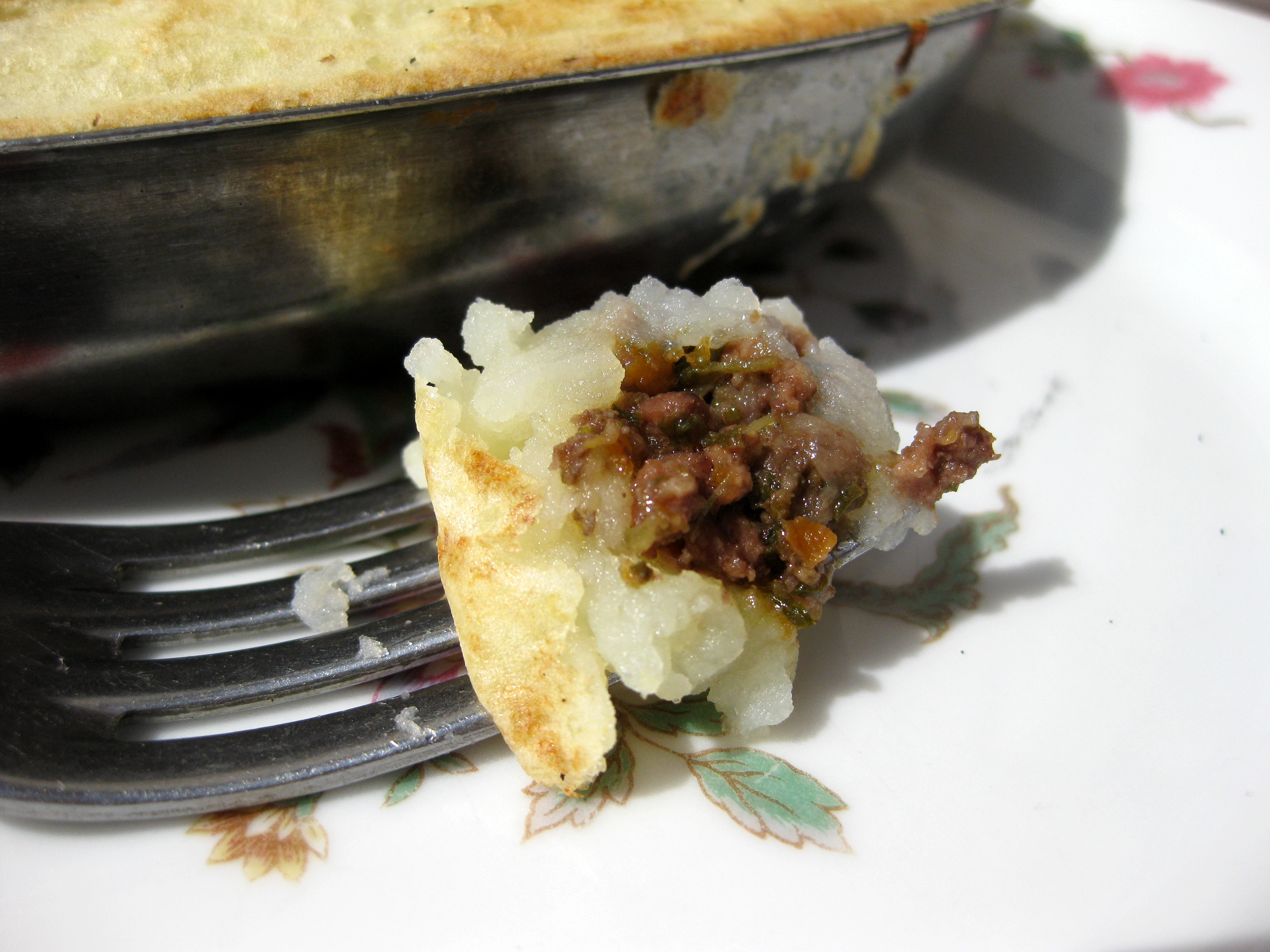
A French dish of mashed, baked potato, combined with diced meat and sauce lyonnaise

Sauce lyonnaise (French pronunciation: [sos ljɔnɛz]) is a compound or small French sauce of demi-glace, white wine, vinegar and onions served with small cuts of meat principally for left-overs.

== See also ==
- Lyonnaise cuisine
- Lyonnaise potatoes
