= Coussin de Lyon =

Sweet confectionery specialty of Lyon, France

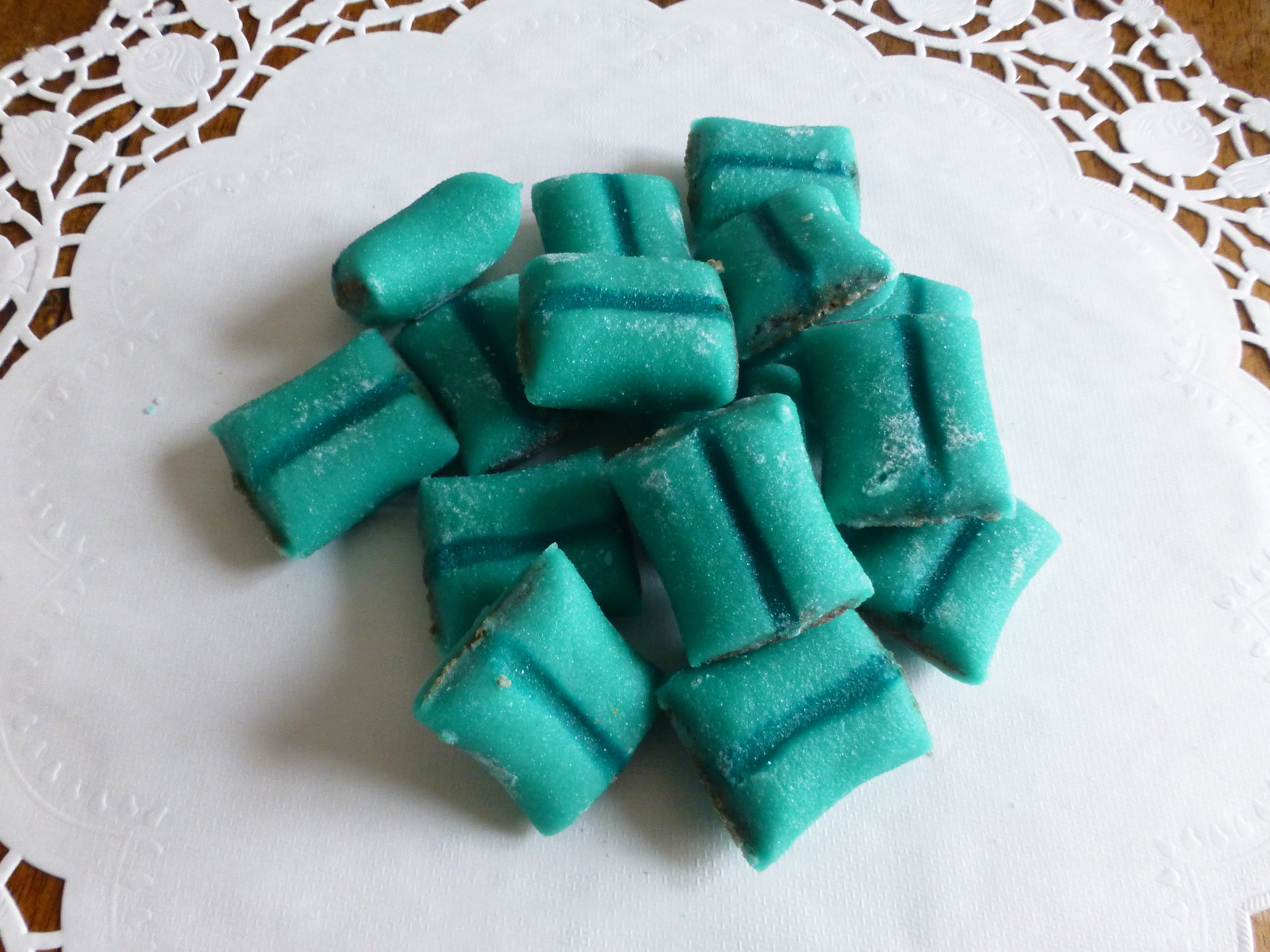
- Type: Confectionery
- Place of origin: France
- Region or state: Lyon
- Created by: Voisin
- Main ingredients: Chocolate, marzipan, curaçao liqueur

The coussin de Lyon (French: [kusɛ̃ də ljɔ̃]) is a sweet specialty of Lyon, France, composed of chocolate and marzipan and created by Voisin, a French chocolatier. The confection is a piece of pale green marzipan, with dark green stripe, filled with a chocolate ganache flavored with curaçao liqueur.

== History ==
During the plague epidemic in 1643, the aldermen of Lyon made a vow to organize a procession at Fourvière to implore the Virgin Mary to save the city. They carried a 7-pound (3.2 kg) wax candle and a gold crown on a silk cushion. This gave the chocolatier Voisin, based in Lyon since 1897, the idea of using the shape of the cushion to create this confection in 1960.

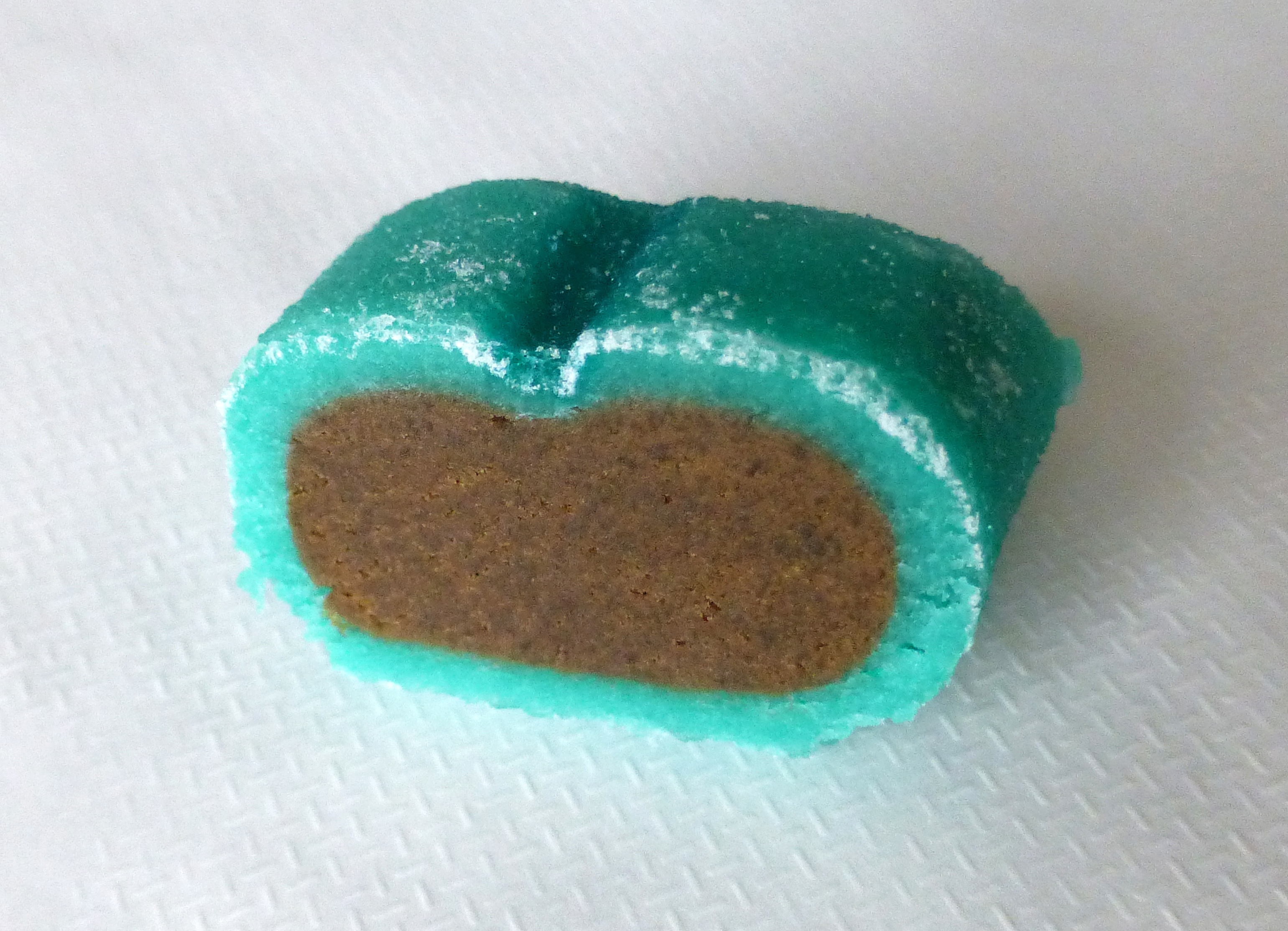
Cross-section of a coussin

This delicacy has become very popular. It is possible to buy the "cushions" individually, and also in velvet boxes which recall the original form of silk cushion.

The Boucaud family has a monopoly in marketing the coussins, which it makes in its network of retail stores across the Rhône-Alpes region and in Marseille. In 2010, company manager Paul Boucaud said that Voisin manufactured 85 tonnes (94 tons) of coussins in Lyon annually and that production increased by 10% year on year. The family does not use large retailers to market its product.

== See also ==
- Lyonnaise cuisine
- List of pastries
