= Cervelas =

Cervelas may refer to:

- Cervelat sausage
  - Cervelas de Lyon
- the rackett
