= Rhône-Alpes =

Rhône-Alpes: Rôno-Arpes (Arpitan); Ròse-Aups (Occitan)
- Region of France
- Flag Coat of arms

- Country: France
- Dissolved: 1 January 2016
- Prefecture: Lyon
- Departments: 9 (8 normal departments, and 1 metropolis): Ain (01); Ardèche (07); Drôme (26); Haute-Savoie (74); Isère (38); Loire (42); Metropolis of Lyon (69M); Rhône (69D); Savoie (73)

Area
  - Total: 43,698 km^{2} (16,872 sq mi)

Population (1 January 2014)
  - Total: 5,645,407
  - Density: 129.19/km^{2} (334.60/sq mi)
- Demonym: Rhônalpin or Rhône-Alpin

GDP
  - Total: €299.156 billion (2024)
  - Per capita: €43,350 (2024)
- Time zone: UTC+1 (CET)
  - Summer (DST): UTC+2 (CEST)
- ISO 3166 code: FR-V
- NUTS Region: FR7
- Website: www.rhonealpes.fr

Rhône-Alpes (French pronunciation: [ʁon alp]) is a historical administrative region of France. Since 1 January 2016, it has been part of the new Auvergne-Rhône-Alpes region. It is located on the eastern border of the country, towards the south. The region was named after the river Rhône and the Alps mountain range. Its capital, Lyon, is the second-largest metropolitan area in France after Paris. Rhône-Alpes has the sixth-largest economy of any European region.

== Geography ==
Rhône-Alpes is located in the southeast of France. The neighboring (pre-2016) regions are Bourgogne (Burgundy) and Franche-Comté to the north, Auvergne to the west, Languedoc-Roussillon to the southwest, and Provence-Alpes-Côte d'Azur to the south. The eastern part of the region is in the Alps, and borders Switzerland and Italy. The highest peak is Mont Blanc, on the French–Italian border. The central part of the region comprises the river valleys of the Rhône and the Saône. The confluence of these two rivers is at Lyon. The western part of the region contains the start of the Massif Central mountain range. The region also borders or contains major lakes such as Lake Geneva (Lac Léman) and Lake Annecy. The Ardèche flows through the southwest portion of the region, where it has carved the deepest gorge in Europe.

As with the rest of France, French is the only official language of the region. Until the mid-20th century, Arpitan was widely spoken in the whole region, while many of the inhabitants of the south spoke varieties of Occitan; both are in steep decline in this region. There are immigrant populations from Armenia, Italy, North Africa, Poland, Portugal, and elsewhere.

Rhône-Alpes is made up of the following departments:

- Ain (01). Capital: Bourg-en-Bresse
- Ardèche (07). Capital: Privas
- Drôme (26). Capital: Valence
- Isère (38). Capital: Grenoble
- Loire (42). Capital: Saint-Étienne
- Rhône (69). Capital: Lyon
- Savoie (73). Capital: Chambéry
- Haute-Savoie (74). Capital: Annecy

And, since 2015, Metropolis with territorial collectivity statute:

- Metropolis of Lyon (69). Capital: Lyon

=== Lakes ===
There are six main lakes in Rhône-Alpes:

- Lac de Paladru
- Lac d'Aiguebelette
- Lac du Bourget
- Lac d'Annecy
- Lac de Nantua
- Lac Léman

== Prefectures ==
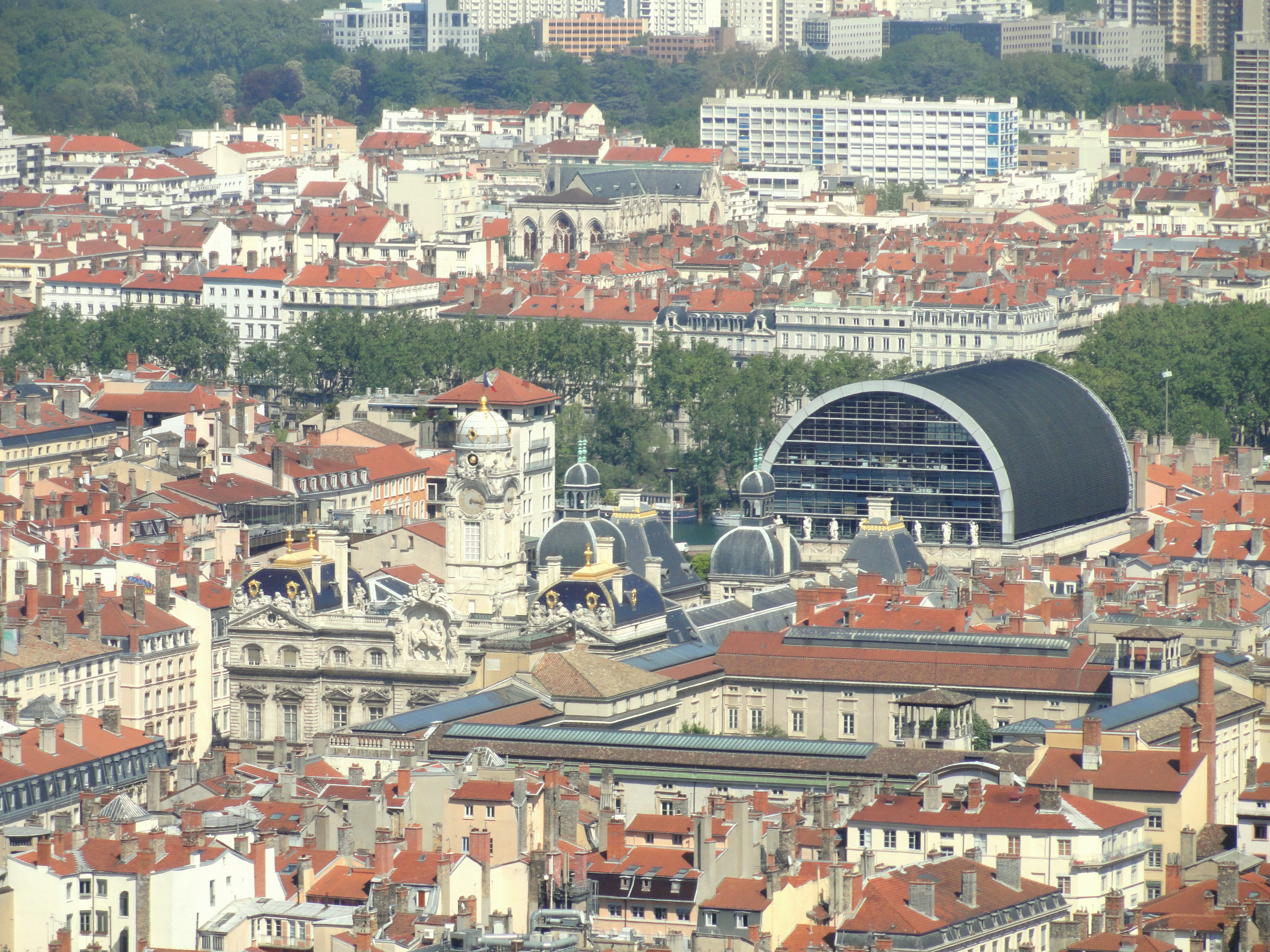
Lyon

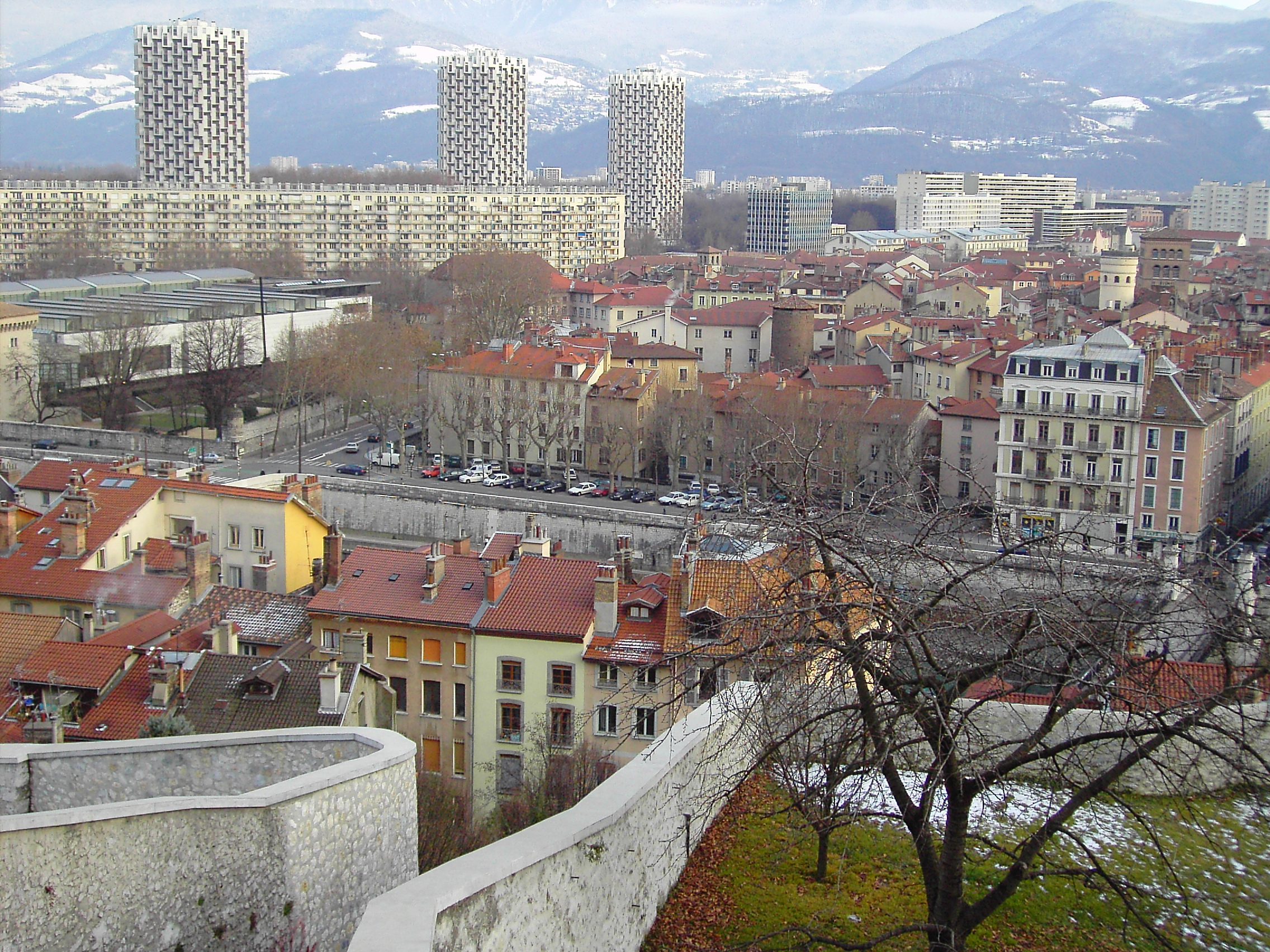
Grenoble

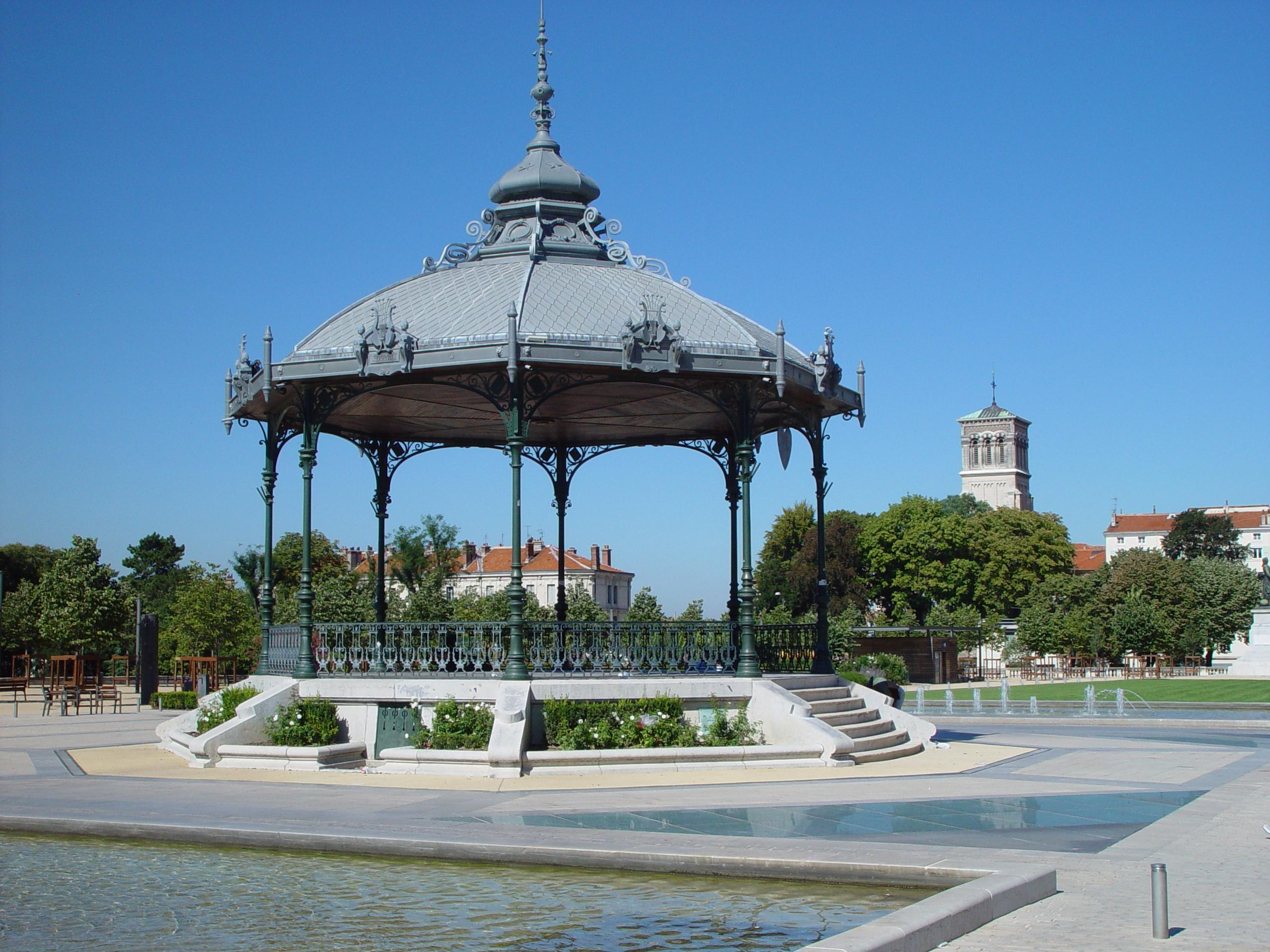
The Kiosque Peynet on the Champ de Mars in Valence

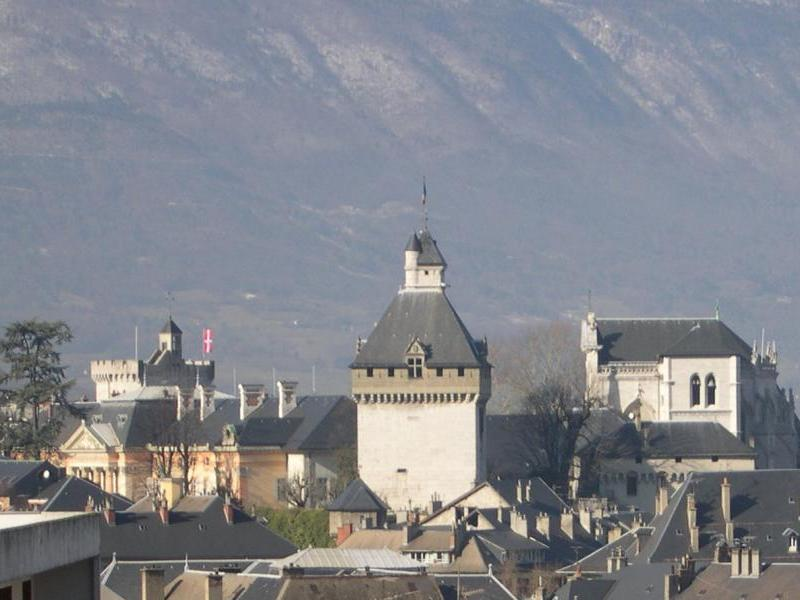
Castle and rooftops in the old section of Chambéry

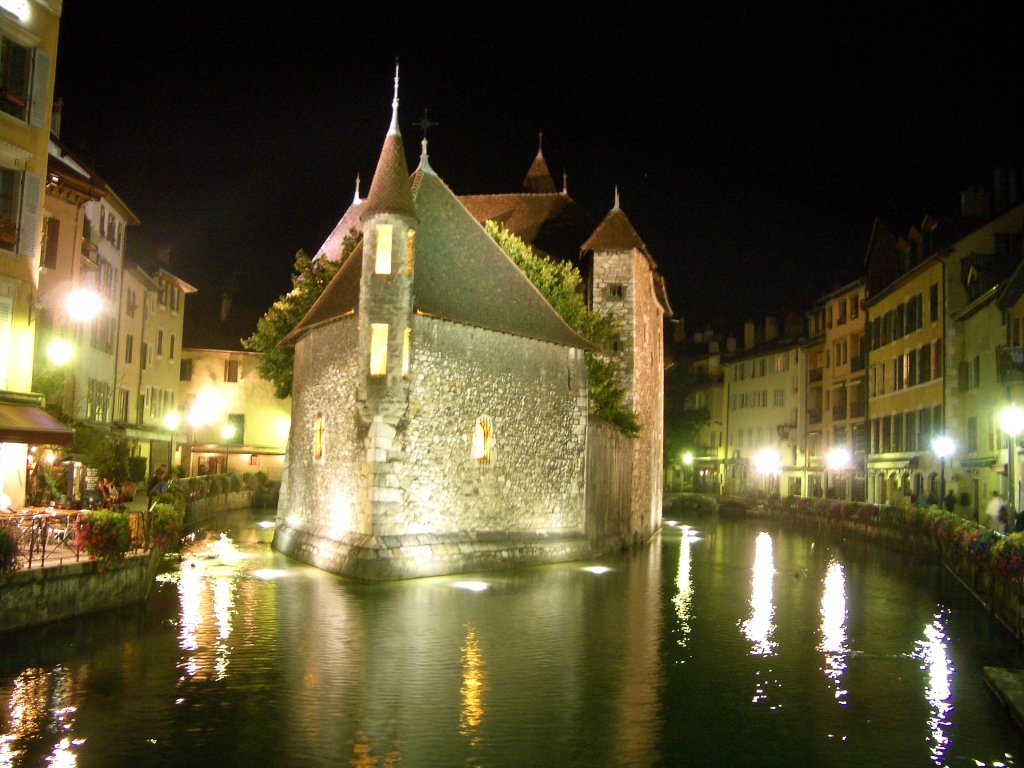
The Palais de l'Isle in Annecy

Prefectures listed in descending order of size:

- Lyon (Rhône)
- Grenoble (Isère)
- Saint-Étienne (Loire)
- Valence (Drôme)
- Chambéry (Savoie)
- Annecy (Haute-Savoie)
- Bourg-en-Bresse (Ain)
- Privas (Ardèche)

== History ==
Although there have been people in Rhône-Alpes since pre-historic times, the earliest recorded settlers of the region were the Gauls (Celts). Cities such as Lyon were founded by them and the region traded with both northern and southern Europe. Most of the area became part of Roman territory during the invasion of Celtic Gaul led by Julius Caesar and was at various times part of the regions of Lugdunensis and Gallia. Lyon itself became a major city in the Roman Empire.

The region, excepting Savoy, was part of the Merovingian and Carolingian Kingdoms before becoming a royal territory under the Capetians. As it became a royal territory early on in French history, its cultural, political and economic influences and developments paralleled those of greater France. (See History of France.)

== Transport ==
Rhône-Alpes is a major European transit hub, linking northern France and Europe to the Mediterranean area. Millions travel along its motorways in summertime from Paris to holidays at the sea. The E15 Euroroute (Britain to Spain) runs through the region. There are international airports at Lyon, Grenoble and Saint-Étienne and many other minor airports and airfields. The region is also a transport hub for the rail network with the TGV running through Lyon from Paris and the north, to the Mediterranean. A high-speed rail link is planned from Lyon to Turin.

== Economy ==
Rhône-Alpes is a prosperous region which can be seen by its per capita GDP of about €31,231 ($40,000), which is higher than the French average, and an average income of €35,910 ($50,246), its economy second in size only to Île-de-France in France. This can be attributed to the diversity of the production in different sectors. The region is one of the Four Motors for Europe.

- Industry, in particular:
  - Light engineering and high technology
  - Mechanical engineering in the area of Annecy
  - Precision machining in the area of Cluses
- Services, in particular:
  - High-tech industries, nanotechnology, biotechnology especially in Grenoble with 62,300 jobs in these sectors thanks to the presence of the Polygone Scientifique, Inovallée and some large companies as Schneider Electric.
  - Optic and design in Saint-Étienne
  - Tourism with the Alps (for skiing), Lyon and Grenoble (for culture) and the Ardèche (adventure sports/camping) particularly popular
  - Education, with major universities in Lyon, Grenoble and Saint-Étienne.

In the past mining, especially coal mining was an important sector, particularly around Saint-Étienne, although this has declined since the 1970s.

The area of the region that lies close to Switzerland has an economy linked to that of Geneva. This area forms a hinterland for the Geneva hub.

The Triangle of Lyon, Saint-Étienne and Grenoble contribute a GDP of €145 billion to the region. When Valence is included, the figure rises to almost €150 billion. In addition, Lyon alone has a Gross Metropolitan Product of about €85 billion.

The region has been part of Alps–Mediterranean Euroregion since 10 July 2007.

== Major cities ==
Annecy	Saint-Chamond
Bourg-en-Bresse	Saint-Étienne
Bron	Saint-Martin-d'Hères
Chambéry	Thonon-les-Bains
Grenoble	Valence
Lyon	Vaulx-en-Velin
Montélimar	Villeurbanne
Roanne	Vénissieux
Vienne	Villefranche-sur-Saône

== Winter Olympics ==
Rhône-Alpes region has hosted the Winter Olympics three times; in 1924 at Chamonix, 1968 at Grenoble, and 1992 at Albertville.

== Tourism ==
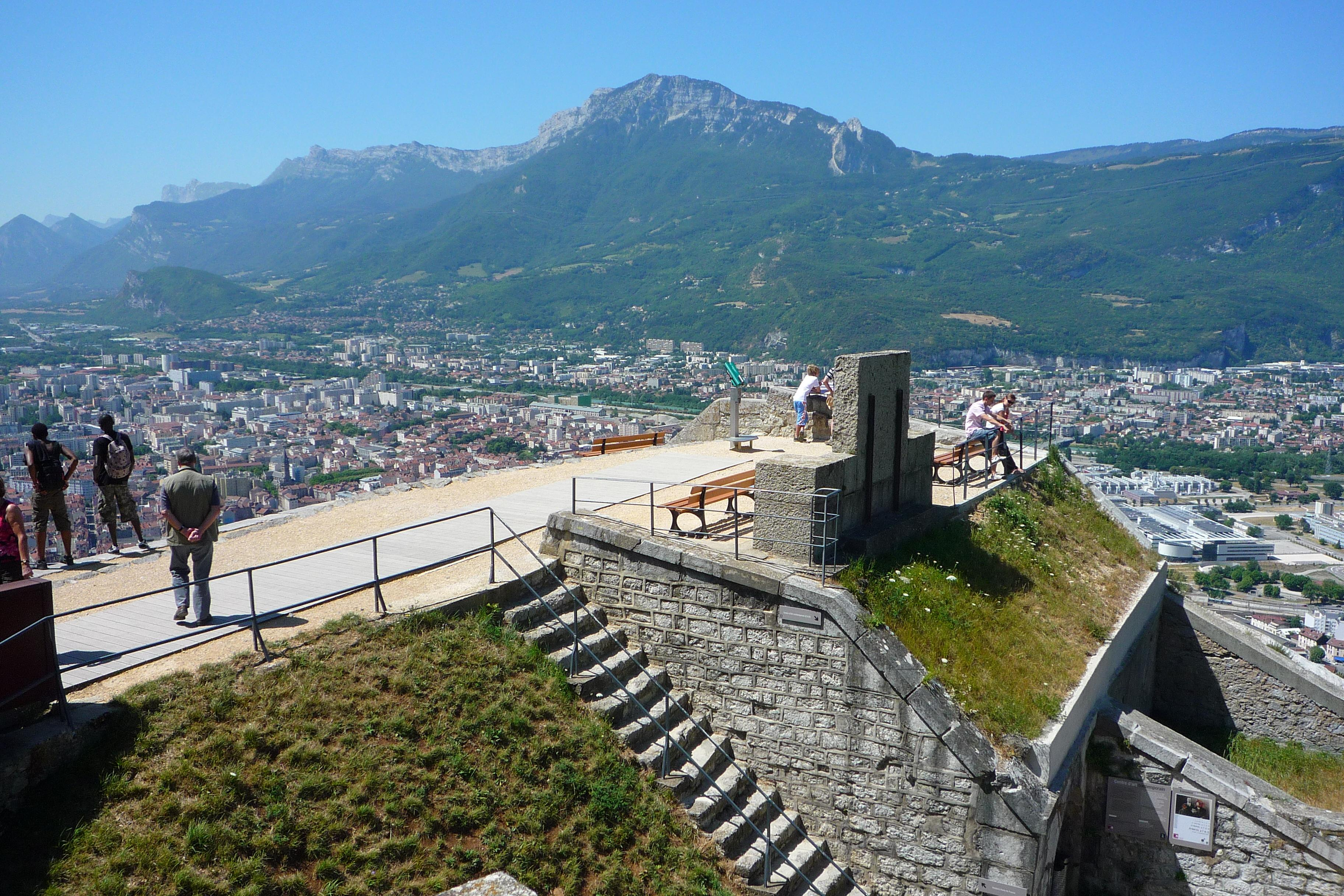
The Bastille, 264 m (866 ft) above Grenoble

Situated between Paris and the Côte d’Azur, on the border with both Switzerland and Italy, and offering access to two international airports (Lyon and Geneva), rail connections and a vast motorway network, the Rhône-Alpes region is at "the crossroads of Europe".

Boasting eight natural parks and peerless sites such as Mont Blanc and the Gorges de l’Ardèche, Rhône-Alpes offers a wide range of different landscapes: mountains, vineyards and gentle valleys, fields of lavender and olive groves.

Every form of sport is readily available, set against a natural backdrop: skiing, hiking, mountain biking or even paragliding and canoeing. Besides hosting three Winter Olympics games due to its being the largest ski area in the world, Rhône-Alpes is the second most important golfing region in France, with over 60 courses.

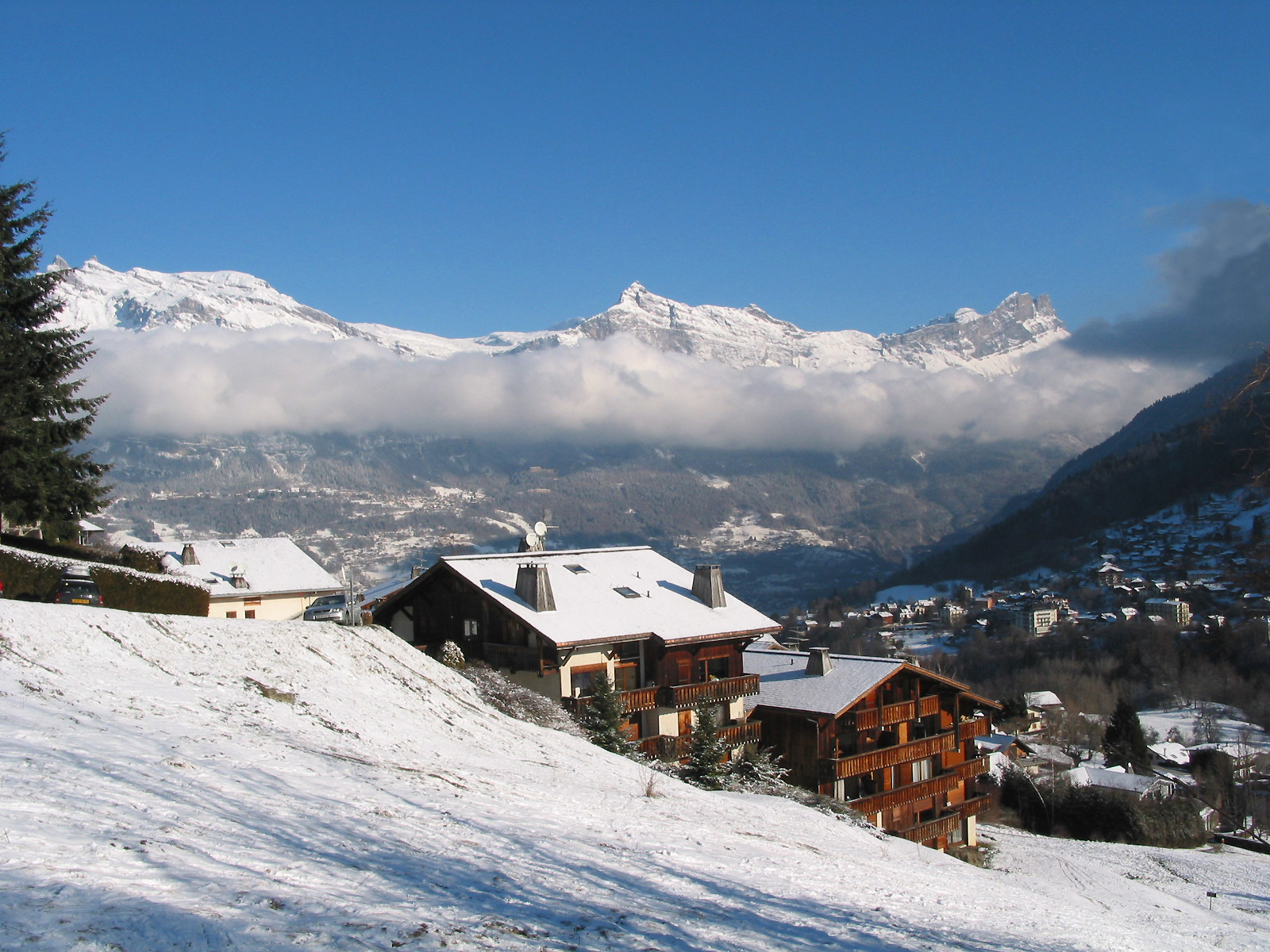
Saint-Gervais-les-Bains has been a popular holiday destination since the early 1900s.

Enthusiasts of art and culture will not be disappointed by the region's Villes d’Art: Lyon, which is classified by UNESCO as a World Heritage site, Annecy, Grenoble, Chambéry, and Saint-Étienne.

=== Gastronomy ===
Lyon is noted as a gastronomic centre of France and specialities served in its traditional bouchons include Lyon sausage, sophisticated salami (known there as "rosette"), tripe and quenelles. In the east of the region the food has an Alpine flavour with dishes such as fondue, raclette common, gratin dauphinois and gratin savoyard. The region is also famous for its Bresse poultry and the many varieties of cheese including Tomme de Savoie, Bleu de Bresse, Reblochon, Saint-Marcellin and Vacherin du Haut-Doubs.

Wines in this region include Beaujolais, Côtes du Rhône and Savoy wine. Chartreuse liqueur is made in the region.

Lyon is the home of very typical and traditional restaurants: the bouchons. Bouchons are usually convivial restaurants serving local dishes, and local wines.

Lyon is famous for its morning snacks, the mâchons, made up of local charcuterie, especially the rosette and usually accompanied by Beaujolais red wine. Traditional local dishes include saucisson de Lyon (sausage), andouillette, coq au vin, esox (pike) quenelle, gras double (tripe cooked with onions), salade lyonnaise (lettuce with bacon, croûtons and a poached egg), marrons glacés and cardoon au gratin.

== See also ==
- List of châteaux in Rhône-Alpes
- Transport in Rhône-Alpes
