= Bouchon =

Type of restaurant found in Lyon, France

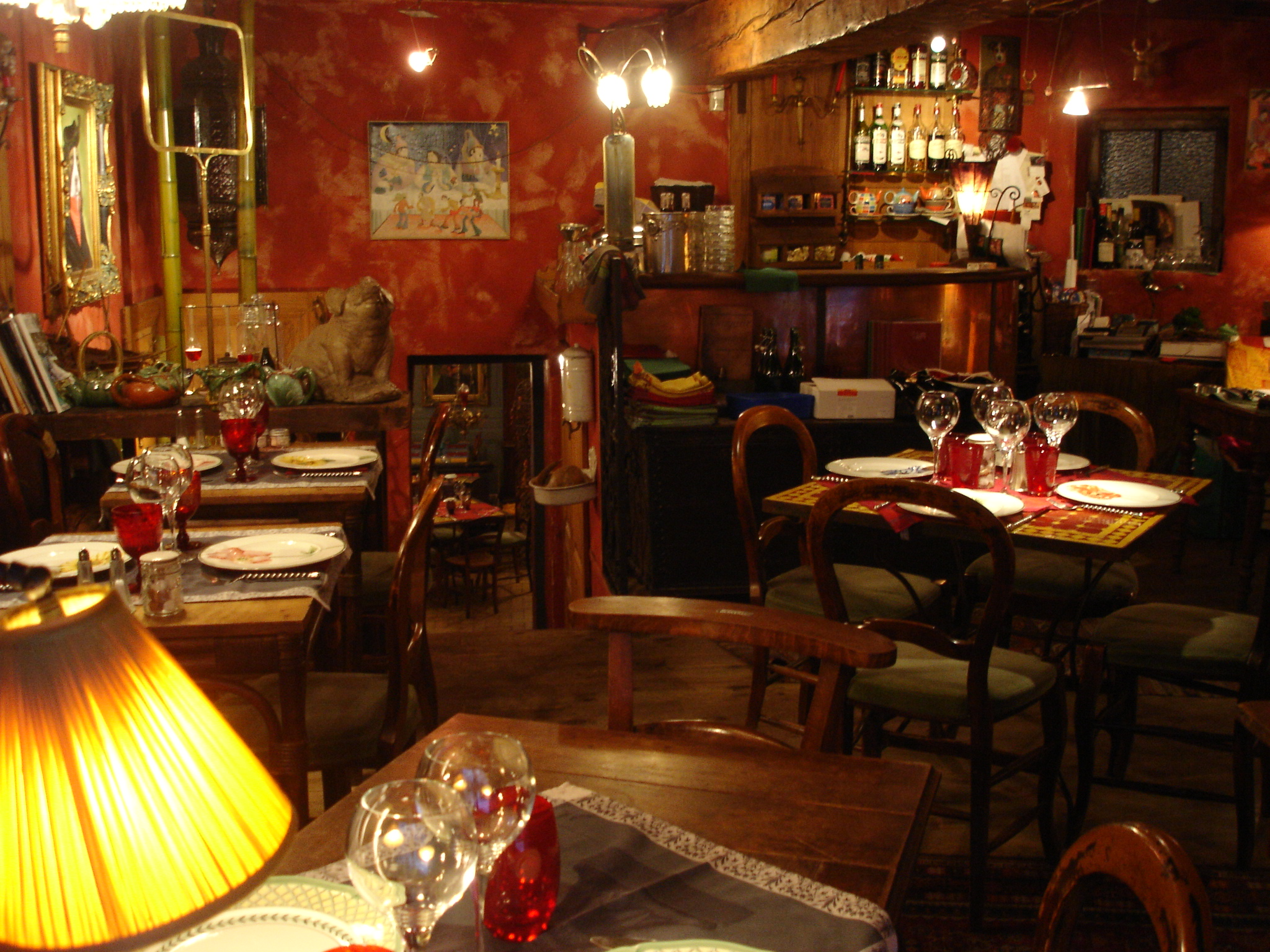
The inside of a typical bouchon

A bouchon (French pronunciation: [buʃɔ̃]) is a type of restaurant found in Lyon, France, that serves traditional Lyonnaise cuisine, such as sausages, coq-au-vin, "salade lyonnaise", duck pâté or roast pork. Compared to other forms of French cooking such as nouvelle cuisine, the dishes are quite hearty. There are approximately twenty officially certified traditional bouchons, but a larger number of establishments describe themselves using the term.

Typically, the emphasis in a bouchon is not on haute cuisine but, rather, a convivial atmosphere and a personal relationship with the owner.

== History ==
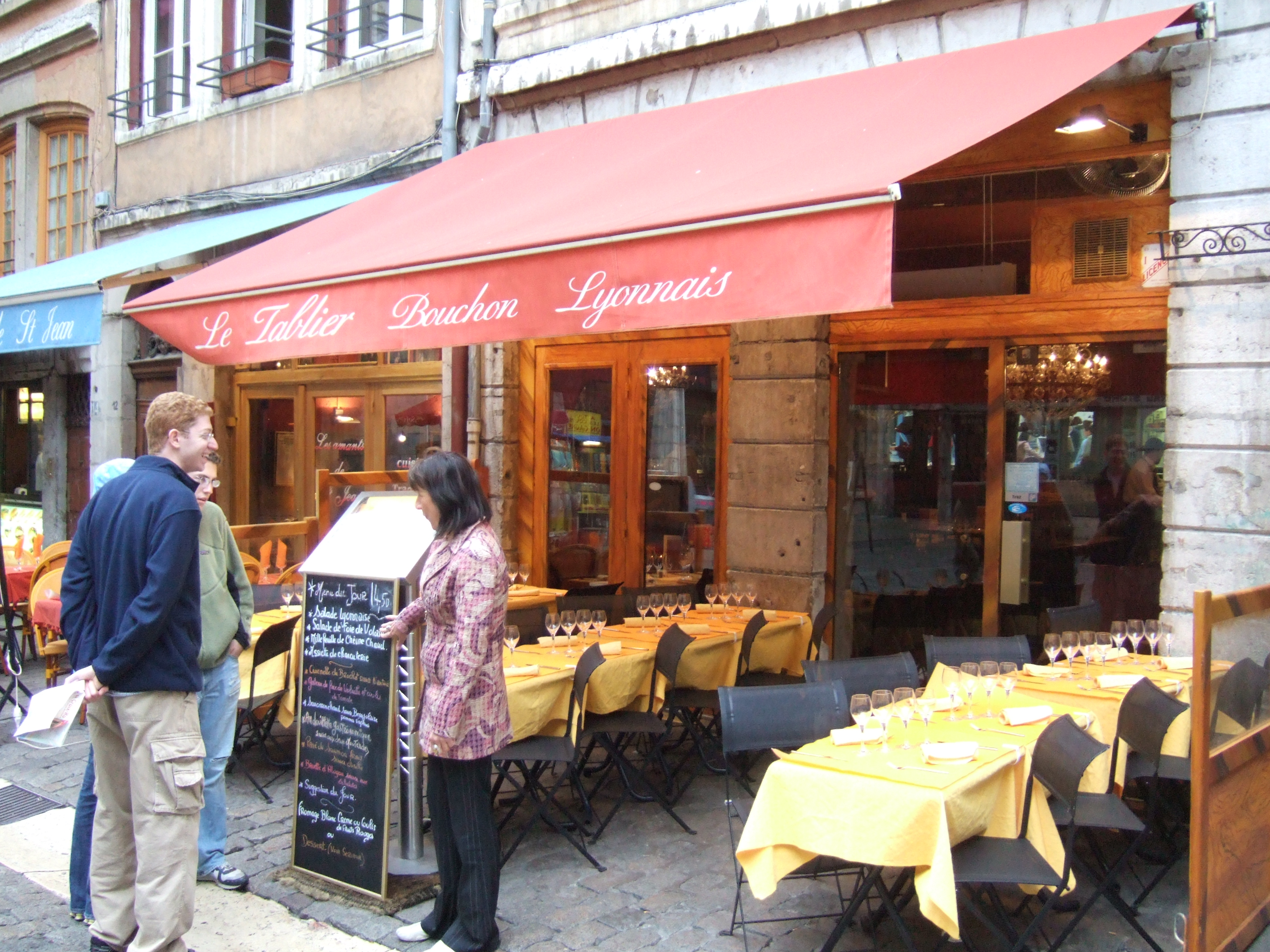
Another bouchon, Le Tablier ("The Apron"), in Vieux Lyon.

The tradition of bouchons came from small inns visited by silk workers passing through Lyon in the seventeenth and eighteenth centuries.

According to the dictionary Le Petit Robert, this name derives from the 16th century expression for a bunch of twisted straw. A representation of such bundles began to appear on signs to designate the restaurants and, by metonymy, the restaurants themselves became known as bouchons. The more common use of "bouchons" as a stopper or cork at the mouth of a bottle, and its derivatives, have the same etymology.

=== Today ===
Since 1997, Pierre Grison and his organization, L'Association de défense des bouchons lyonnais (The Association for the Preservation of Lyonnais Bouchons), bestow annual certifications to restaurants as "authentic" bouchons. These restaurants receive the title Les Authentiques Bouchons Lyonnais and are identified with a sticker showing the marionette Gnafron, a Lyonnais symbol of the pleasures of dining, with a glass of wine in one hand and a napkin bearing the Lyon crest in the other.

The following list, subject to some fluctuation as the certification is bestowed annually, contains most of the certified bouchons: Abel, Brunet, Café des deux places, Café des fédérations, Chabert et fils, Daniel et Denise, Chez Georges le petit bouchon, Les gones, Hugon, Le Jura, Chez Marcelle, Le Mercière, La mère Jean, Le mitonné, Le Morgon, Le musée, Chez Paul, Les Trois Maries, A ma vigne, and Le Vivarais.

While many bouchons are now oriented strongly towards the tourist market, with increased prices and less traditional fare as a result, a typical meal in a real bouchon costs around €12-15 as of 2006.

== Cuisine ==
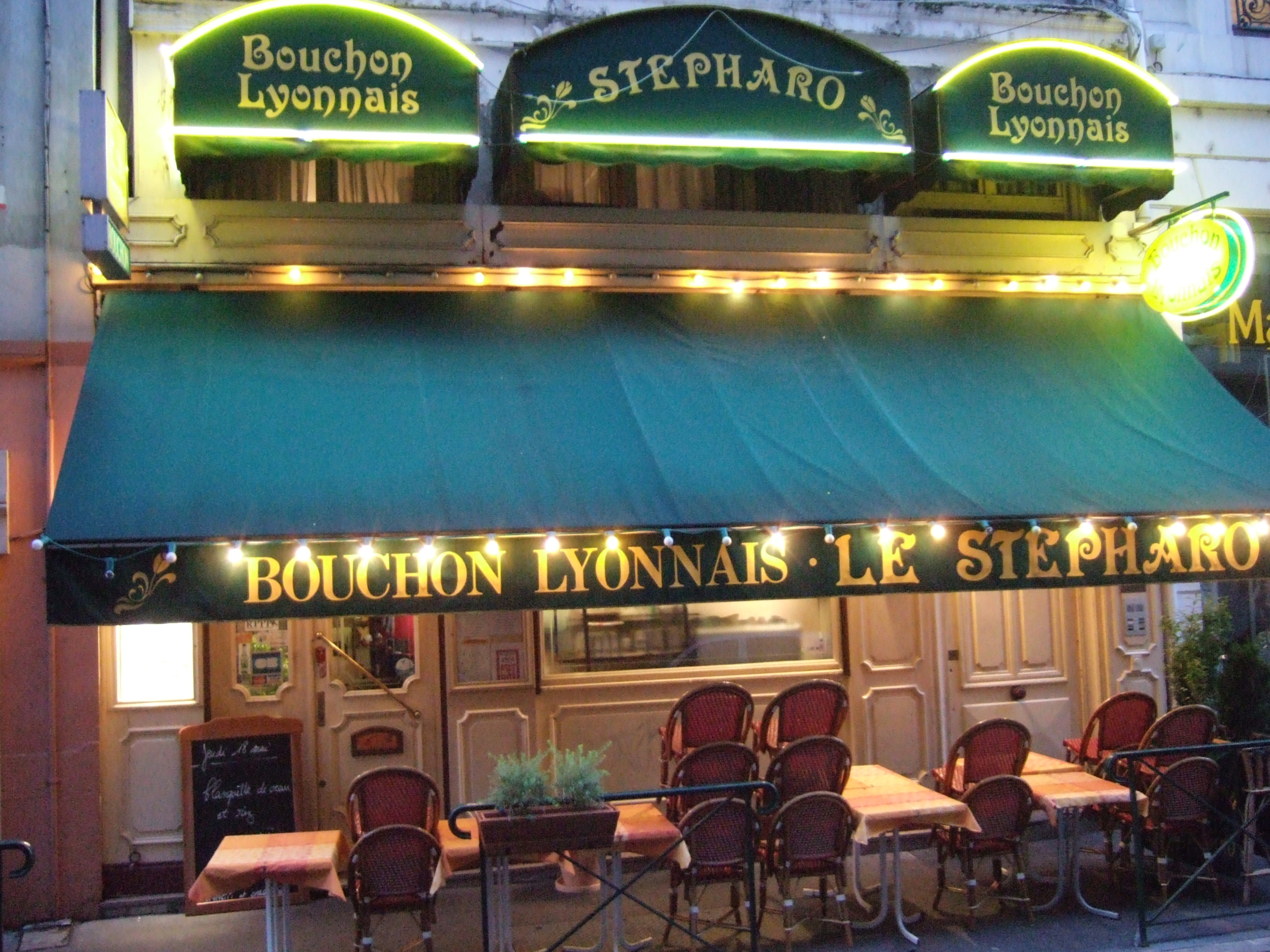
A bouchon in Lyon

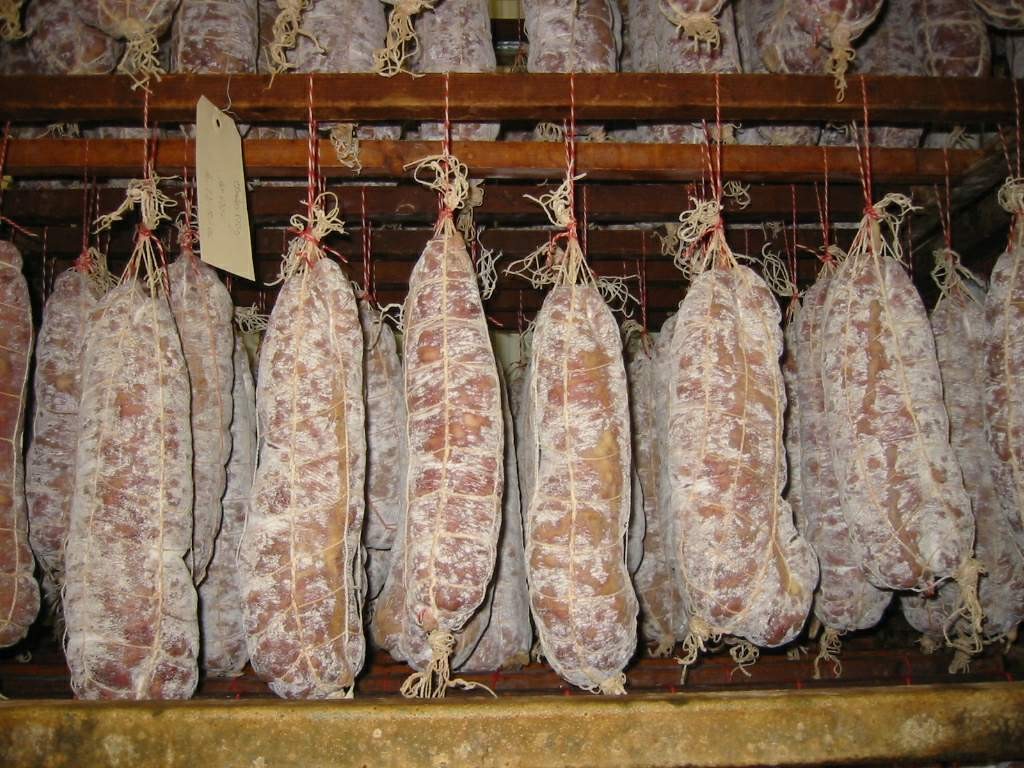
Dried saucissons de Lyon

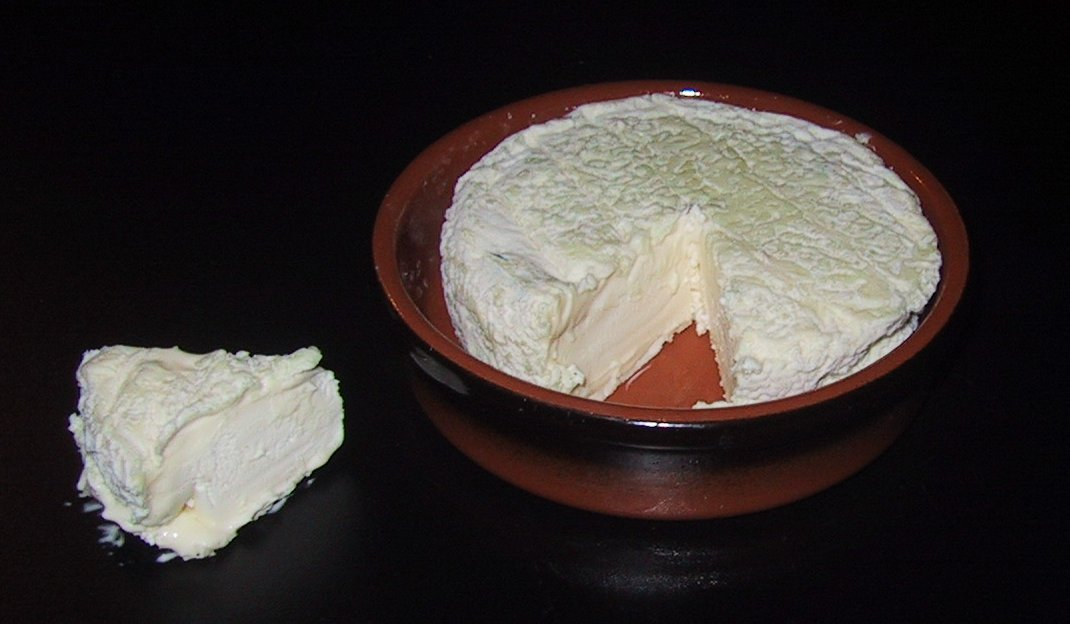
Saint-Félicien, a typical cheese from Lyon

Typical items in the bouchon repertoire include:

Soup
Tripe soup, pumpkin soup
Salads and cold appetizers
Chicken liver salad, pork head cheese, groins d'âne salad (literally, "donkey snout" salad), marinated herrings, salade Lyonnaise (lettuce with bacon, croutons, mustard dressing, and a poached egg)
Hot appetizers
gateau de volaille (chicken liver cake), boudin noir (blood sausage, usually served with warm apples)
Offal
Andouillette (pork offal sausage), assorted offal gratin, tablier de sapeur
Fish
Stingray, quenelles (ground fish dumplings), grilled fillets
Meat
Coq au vin, pot-au-feu (pot roast), chicken thighs stuffed with morels
Vegetables
Cardoon à la moelle (in bone marrow), barboton, pailasson de Lyon
Cheese
Saint-Marcellin, Saint-Félicien, Rigotte de Condrieu
Desserts
tarte praline (praline tart), lemon meringue pie, caramelized apples, bugnes de Lyon (miniature beignets)

== See also ==
- Les Toques Blanches Lyonnaises

== Bibliography ==
- Everylen et Jean-Marc Boudou (2003). Les Bonnes Recettes des Bouchons Lyonnais. Libris. ISBN 2-84799-002-X.
