= Sabodet =

Pig's head sausage in Lyonnaise cuisine

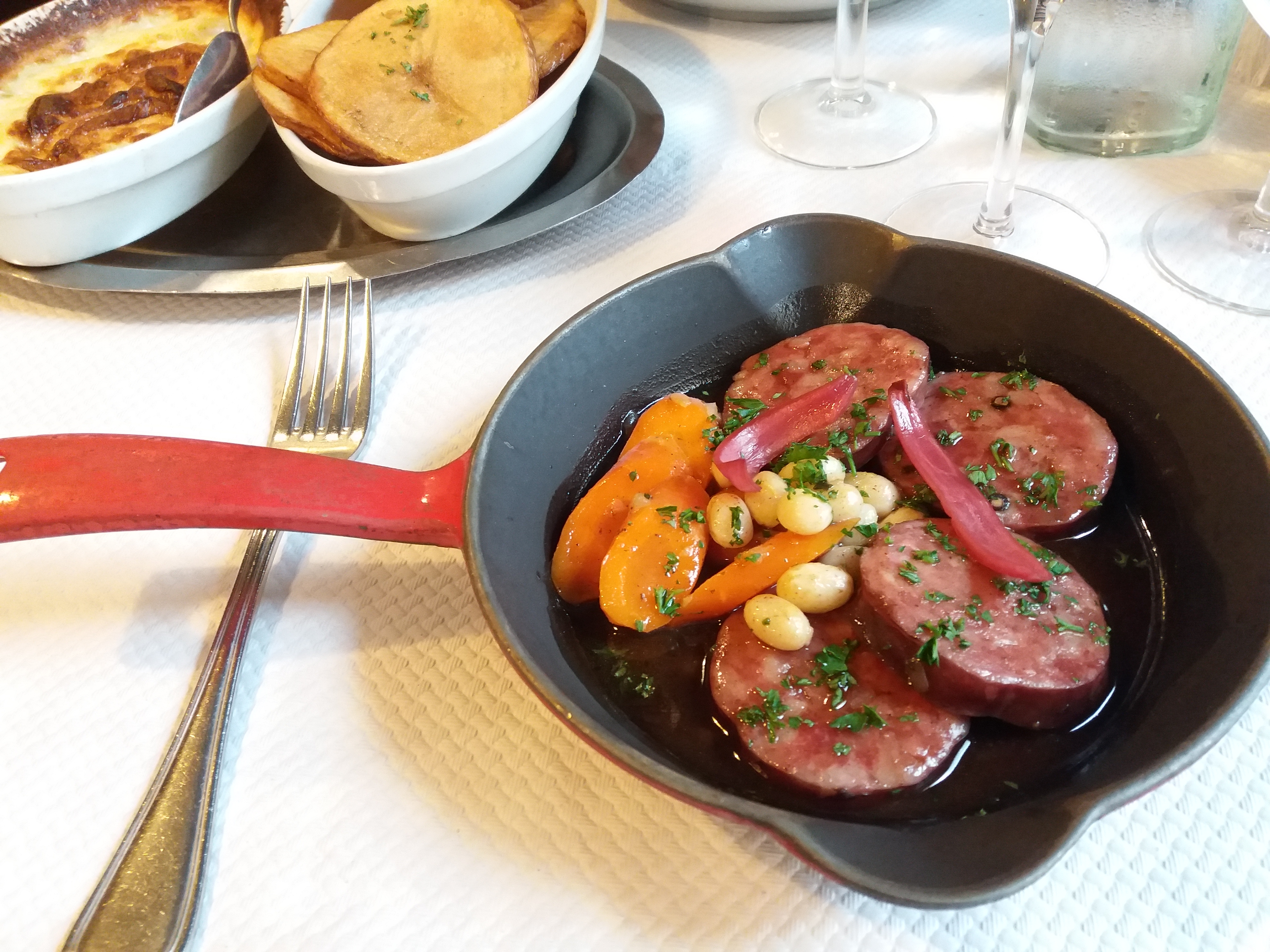
Sabodet

Sabodet, coudenat, or coudenou is a large sausage made from pig's head in Lyonnaise cuisine. Besides the head, it includes tongue, fatty pork, and beef. It is served warm, cut into thick slices. The name derives from the sausage's original shape, like that of a sabot (clog).

== See also ==
- List of sausages
