= Tablier de sapeur =

Lyonnais dish made from beef tripe

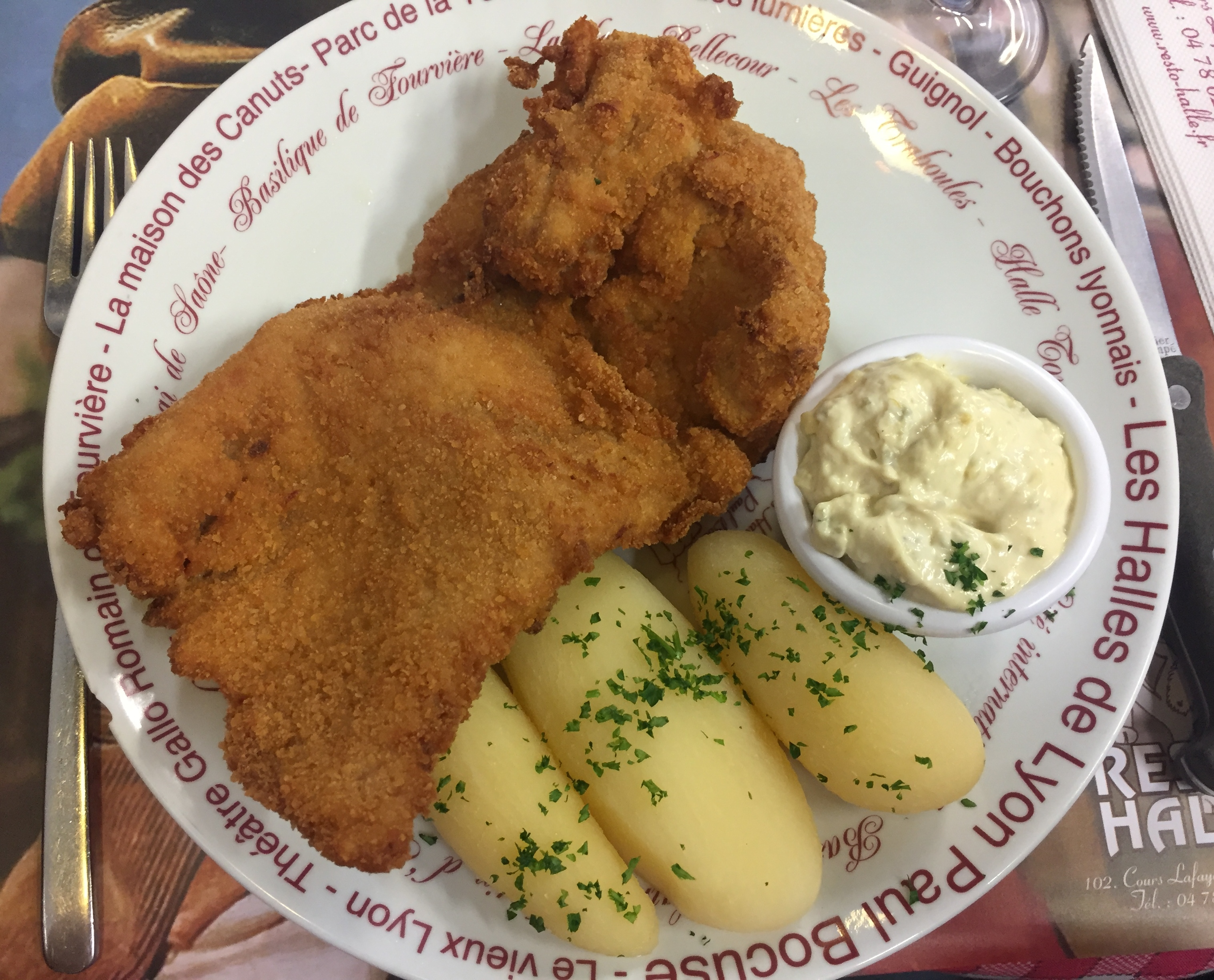
- Place of origin: France
- Region or state: Lyon
- Main ingredients: Tripe

Tablier de sapeur (French pronunciation: [ta.bli.je də sa.pœʁ]; lit. 'sapper's apron') is a Lyonnais speciality dish made from beef tripe, specifically the gras-double, which is the membrane of the rumen (the first chamber of a cow's stomach). It is one of the most common dishes served in the bouchons of Lyon.

== Etymology and history ==
The dish was formerly known as tablier de Gnafron (French pronunciation: [ta.bli.je də ɲa.fʁɔ̃]; lit. 'Gnafron's apron'), in reference to Gnafron, a leather-aproned cobbler character in the Lyonnais Guignol marionette theatre. The renaming to tablier de sapeur is generally attributed to Maréchal de Castellane (1788–1862), the Marshal of France who served as military governor of Lyon from 1850 and as senator under Napoléon III from January 1852. Castellane had served earlier in the Sapeurs du Génie (the French military engineering corps), whose members wore heavy leather aprons to protect their uniforms during fortification and trench work; the rectangular, breaded slab of tripe was said to resemble these aprons. The renaming dates to around 1850.

== Preparation ==
The gras-double is first poached in a court-bouillon until tender, then cut into rectangular pieces and marinated in white wine, often with lemon juice, mustard, and aromatics. The marinated tripe is then dipped in beaten egg, coated in breadcrumbs, and pan-fried until golden and crisp.

== Service ==
Tablier de sapeur is typically served hot with steamed or boiled potatoes and a sauce gribiche, a cold emulsified sauce of hard-boiled egg yolks, mustard, oil, vinegar, capers, and chopped herbs. In Lyonnais bouchons, chives are commonly added to the gribiche, and the dish is frequently paired with a young red wine from Beaujolais or the Côtes du Rhône.
