= Rosette de Lyon =

Cured saucisson or French pork sausage

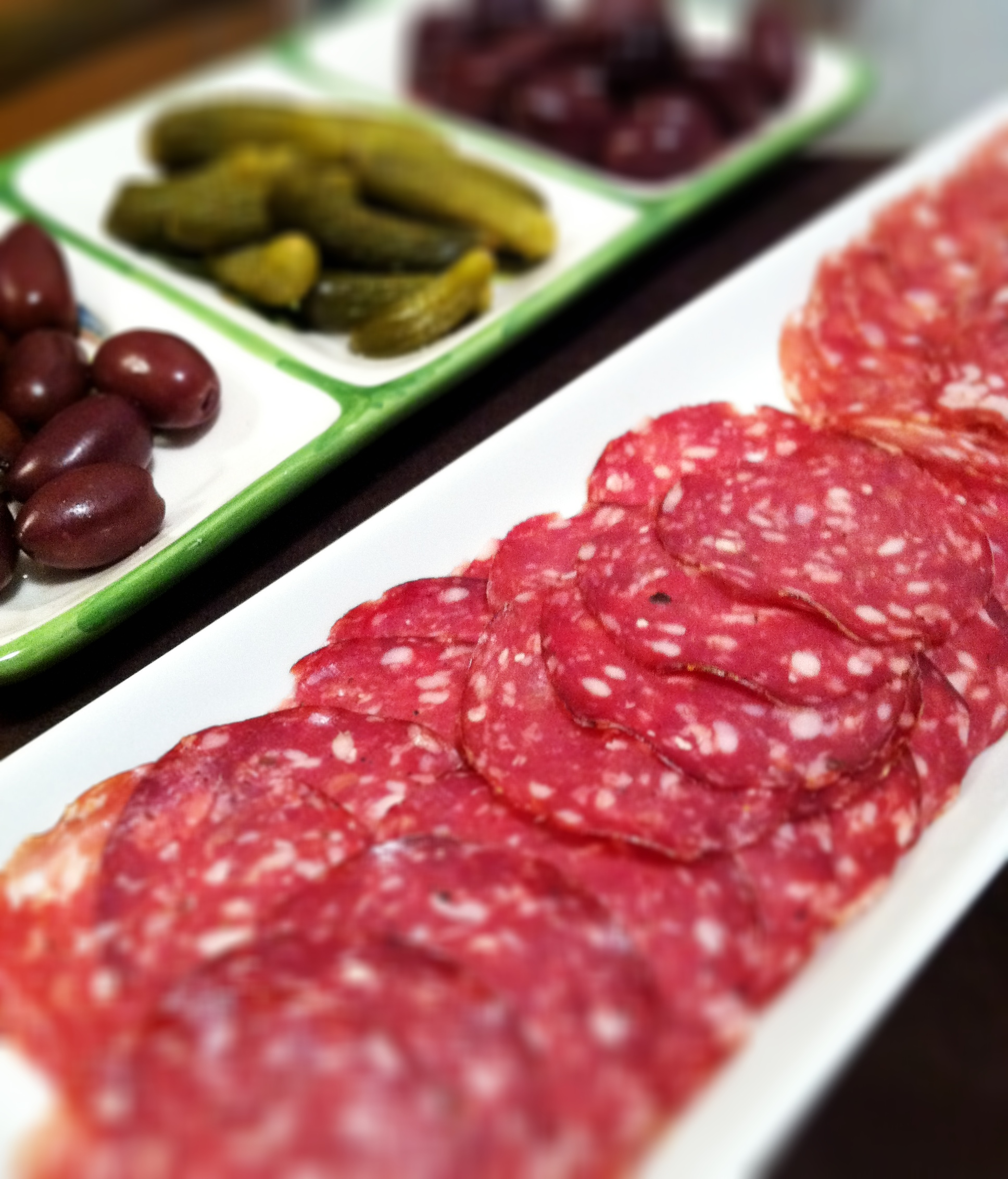
Rosette de Lyon

Rosette de Lyon (French: [ʁɔzɛt də ljɔ̃]) is a cured saucisson from France. It is made from pork and usually served thinly sliced.

== See also ==
- Lyonnaise cuisine
- List of sausages
