= Rigotte de Condrieu =

French goat cheese

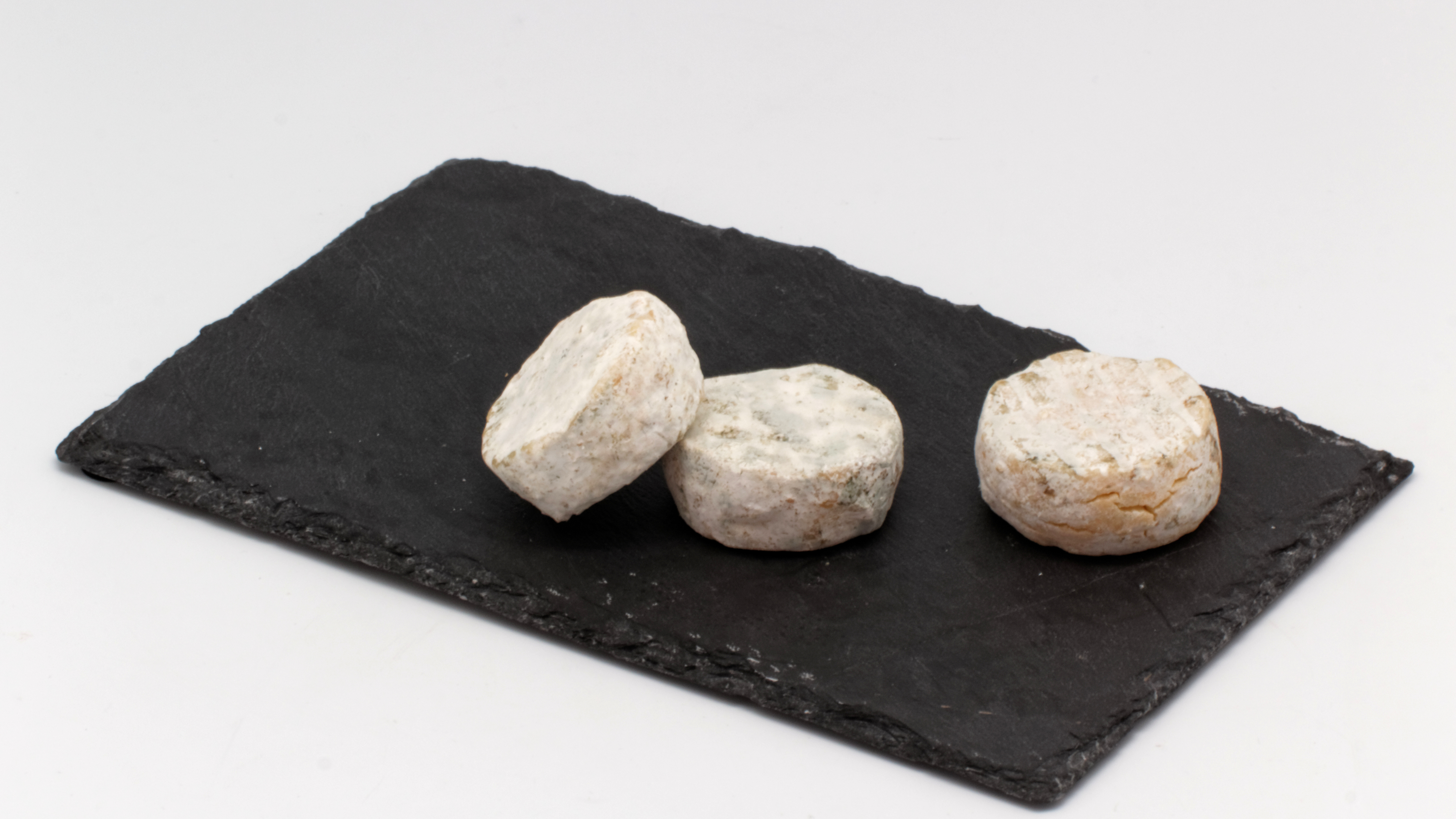
Rigotte de Condrieu

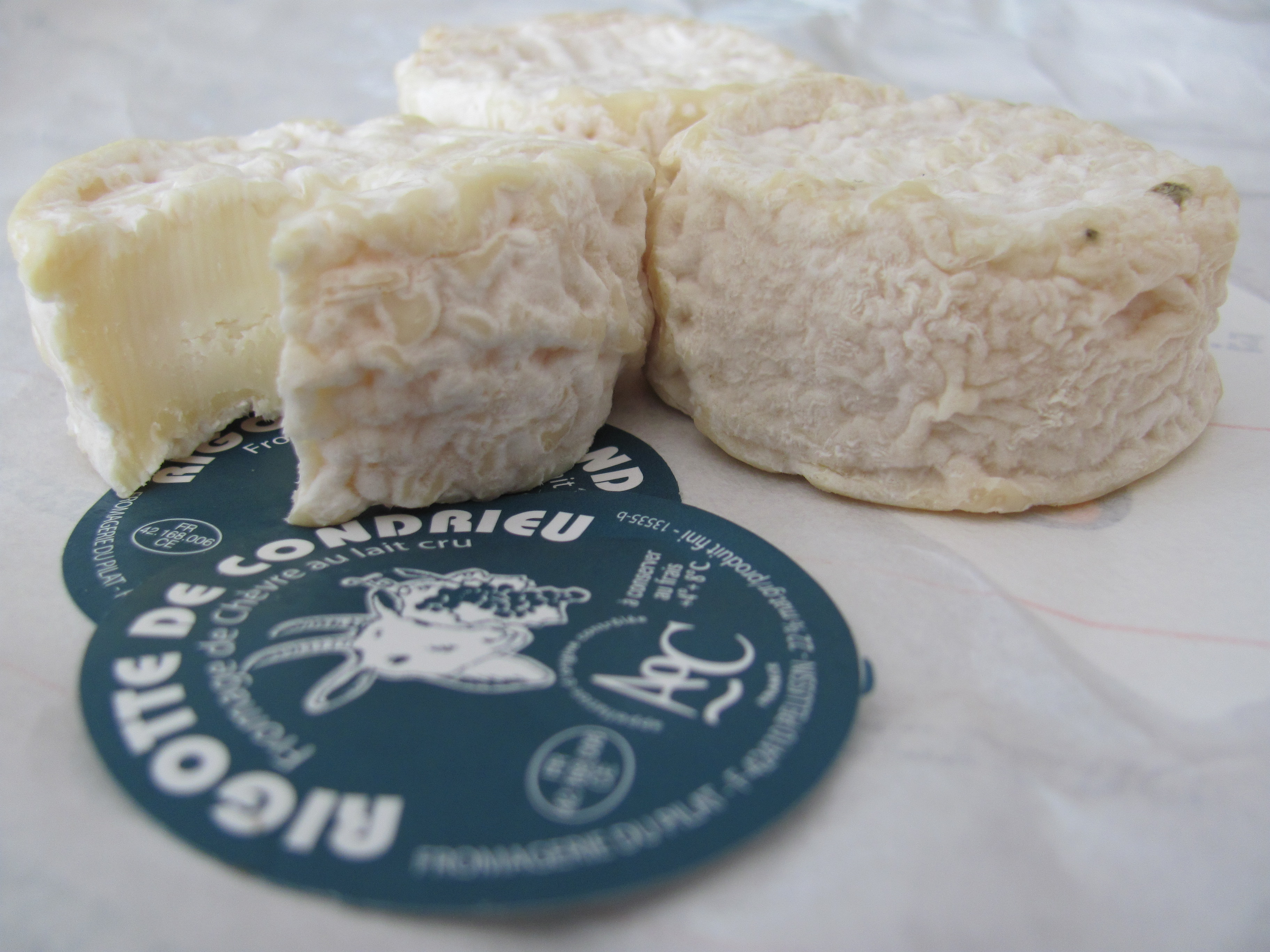
Interior texture of rigotte de Condrieu (left)

The rigotte de Condrieu (French pronunciation: [ʁiɡɔt də kɔ̃dʁijø]) is a type of cheese made with goat's milk which originates in the Lyonnaise region of France and is named after the town of Condrieu.

It has had French AOC since 2008 and acquired European PDO in November 2013.

== See also ==
- List of goat milk cheeses
