= Lyonnaise potatoes =

Pan-fried potatoes

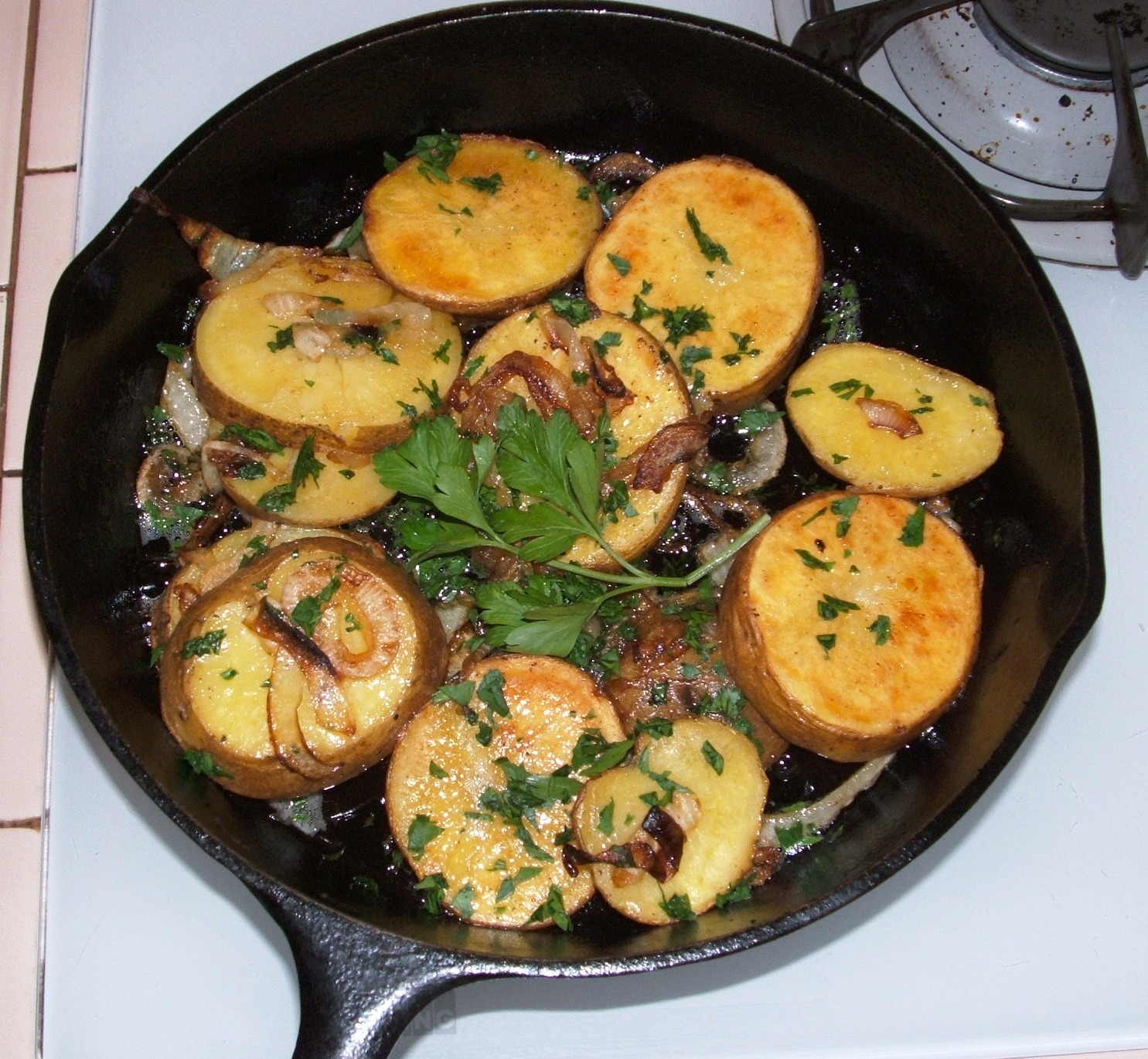
- Place of origin: France
- Main ingredients: Potatoes, onions, butter

Lyonnaise potatoes (French: pommes de terre sautées à la lyonnaise, pronounced [pɔm də tɛʁ sotez‿a la ljɔnɛz]) is a French dish where potatoes are boiled, sliced, and shallow-fried, then served together with fried onions.

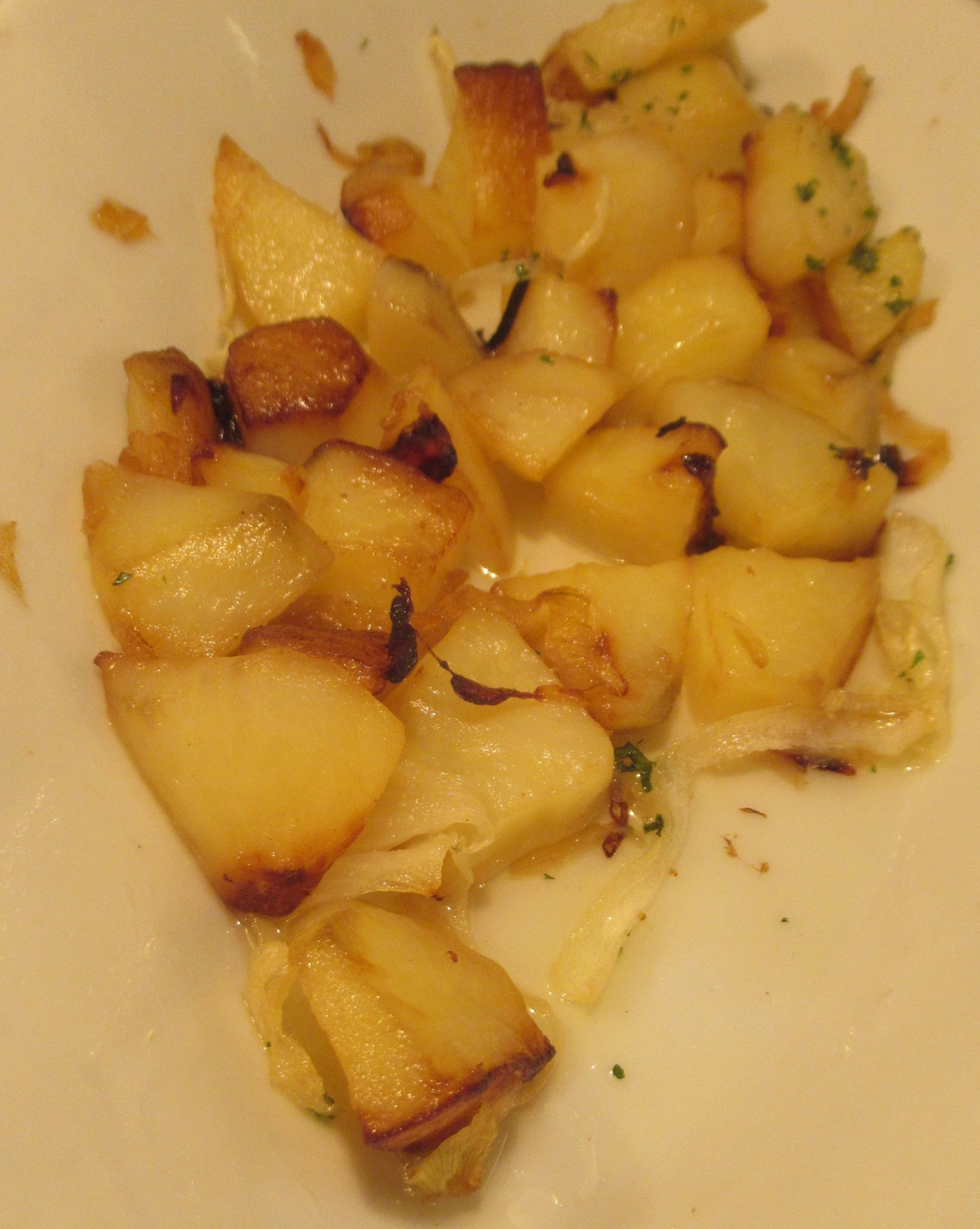
Lyonnaise potatoes (Philippines)

== History and ingredients ==
The culinary term à la lyonnaise – in the style of Lyon – is applied to numerous French dishes and generally means that onions are a key part of the recipe. Potatoes à la lyonnaise are sautéed and served with fried onions. All five recipes mentioned below, dating from 1806 to 1970, call for the potatoes to be boiled, peeled and sliced, before frying.

André Viard, in Le Cuisinier impérial (1806), stipulates that the potatoes are to be sliced and covered with onion purée before being fried in butter and served with sliced onions that have been gently simmered in water. By the mid-19th century, recipes specified that the onions, as well as the potatoes, should be fried. In Alexis Soyer's recipe (1846) the onions are fried in butter and the sliced boiled potatoes are added to the pan. Soyer adds chopped parsley and lemon juice.

August Escoffier (1907) recommends frying the potatoes and the onions separately in butter before combining them and sprinkling them with chopped parsley. Marcel Boulestin's recipe (1931) adds the onion raw to the pan in which the potatoes are frying. Elizabeth David (1970) specifies frying the onions first and adding them to the frying potatoes when the latter are very nearly cooked. She recommends either butter or beef dripping for frying both ingredients, and comments that the dish cooked in this way "bears little resemblance ... to the greasy mixture of unevenly browned potatoes and frizzled onions which usually passes for pommes lyonnaises".

== See also ==
- Home fries

== Sources ==
- Boulestin, Marcel (1931). What Shall We Have Today?. London: Heinemann. OCLC 499225260.
- David, Elizabeth (2008) [1960]. French Provincial Cooking. London: Folio Society. OCLC 809349711.
- Escoffier, Auguste (1907) [1903]. Le Guide culinaire (second ed.). Paris: Bibliothèque professionnelle. OCLC 1202735677.
- Soyer, Alexis (1846). The Gastronomic Regenerator. London: Simpkin and Marshall. OCLC 1505372.
- Viard, André (1806). Le Cuisinier impérial. Paris: Barba. OCLC 763819873.
