= Kitchen brigade =

Restaurant kitchen team structure

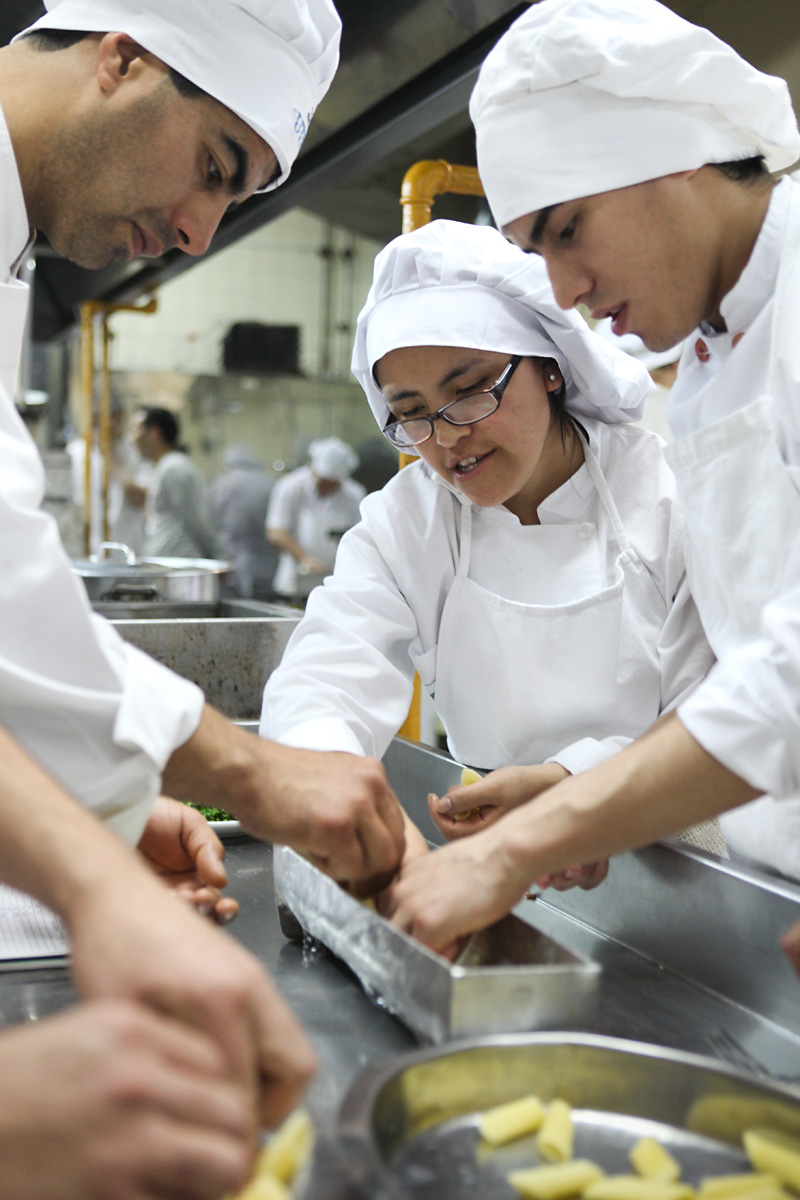

The kitchen brigade (brigade de cuisine, French pronunciation: [bʁiɡad də kɥizin]) is a system of hierarchy found in restaurants and hotels employing extensive staff, commonly referred to as "kitchen staff" in English-speaking countries.

The concept was developed by Auguste Escoffier (1846–1935). This structured team system delegates responsibilities to different individuals who specialize in certain tasks in the kitchen or in the dining room.

== List of positions ==
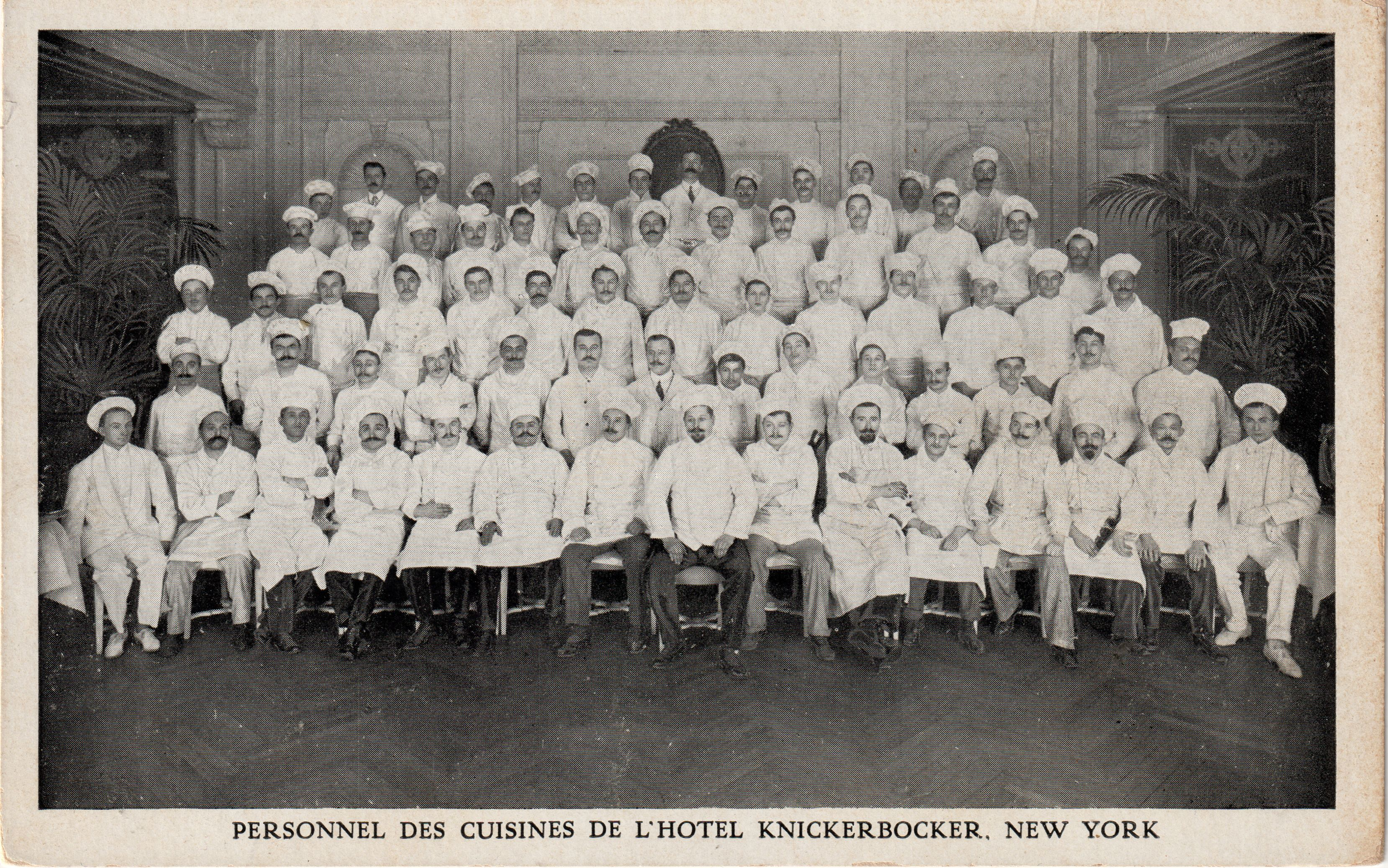
Kitchen staff of the Hotel Knickerbocker, New York - circa 1930s

This is a comprehensive list of the members of a full kitchen brigade. Only the largest of establishments would have a staff of this size. As noted under some titles, certain positions are combined into other positions when such a large staff is unnecessary. Note: Despite the use of chef in English as the title for a cook, the word actually means "chief" or "head" in French. Similarly, cuisine means "kitchen", but also refers to food or cooking generally, or a type of food or cooking.

Chef de cuisine (kitchen chef; "chief of the kitchen")
is responsible for overall management of kitchen; supervises staff, creates menus and new recipes with the assistance of the restaurant manager, makes purchases of raw food items, trains apprentices, and maintains a sanitary and hygienic environment for the preparation of food.
Sous-chef de cuisine (deputy or second kitchen chef; "under-chief")
receives orders directly from the chef de cuisine for the management of the kitchen, and often serves as the representative when the chef de cuisine is not present.
Saucier (sauce maker or sauté cook)
prepares sauces and warm hors d'oeuvres, completes meat dishes, and in smaller restaurants, may work on fish dishes and prepare sautéed items.
Chef de partie (senior chef; "chief of the group")
is responsible for managing a given station in the kitchen, specializing in preparing particular dishes there. Those who work in a lesser station are commonly referred to as a demi-chef.
Cuisinier (cook)
is an independent position, usually preparing specific dishes in a station; may also be referred to as a cuisinier de partie.
Commis (junior cook / assistant cook)
also works in a specific station, but reports directly to the chef de partie and takes care of the tools for the station.
Apprenti(e) (apprentice)
are often students gaining theoretical and practical training in school and work experience in the kitchen. They perform preparatory work and/or cleaning work. An apprenti is a male, and apprentie female.
Plongeur (dishwasher or kitchen porter)
cleans dishes and utensils, and may be entrusted with basic preparatory jobs.

Marmiton (pot and pan washer; kitchen porter)
in larger restaurants, takes care of all the pots and pans instead of the plongeur.

Rôtisseur (roast cook)
manages a team of cooks that roasts, broils, and deep fries dishes.

Grillardin (grill cook)
in larger kitchens, prepares grilled foods instead of the rôtisseur.
Friturier (fry cook)
in larger kitchens, prepares fried foods instead of the rôtisseur.

Poissonnier (fish cook)
prepares fish and seafood dishes.
Entremétier or entremettier (entrée preparer)
prepares soups and other dishes without meat or fish, including vegetable dishes and egg dishes. Originally the entremets preparer.

Potager (soup cook)
in larger kitchens, reports to the entremétier and prepares the soups. (Cf. jardin potager)
Legumier (vegetable cook)
in larger kitchens, also reports to the entremétier and prepares the vegetable dishes.

Garde manger (pantry supervisor; "food keeper")
is responsible for preparation of cold hors d'oeuvres, pâtés, terrines and aspics; prepares salads; organizes large buffet displays; and prepares charcuterie items.

Charcutier (charcuterie specialist)
in larger kitchens, reports to the garde manger and specializes in making prepared meat products, such as terrines, galantines, ballotines, pâtés, and confits, primarily from pork, although confits are mostly waterfowl and terrines and pâtés often include other types of meat.

Tournant (spare hand/roundsman)
moves throughout the kitchen, assisting other positions in kitchen.
Pâtissier (pastry cook)
prepares desserts and other meal-end sweets, and for locations without a boulanger, also prepares breads and other baked items; may also prepare pasta.

Confiseur (confectioner)
in larger restaurants, prepares candies and petit fours instead of the pâtissier.
Glacier (glazier)
in larger restaurants, prepares frozen and cold desserts instead of the pâtissier.
Décorateur (decorator)
in larger restaurants, prepares show pieces and specialty cakes instead of the pâtissier.
Boulanger (baker)
in larger restaurants, prepares bread, cakes, and breakfast pastries instead of the pâtissier.
Chocolatier (chocolate specialist)
in larger restaurants, prepares chocolate confections and show pieces instead of the pâtissier.
Fromager (cheese specialist)
in larger restaurants, prepares meal-end cheese courses instead of the pâtissier.

Boucher (butcher)
butchers meats, poultry, and sometimes fish; may also be in charge of breading meat and fish items.
Aboyeur ("barker", announcer/expediter)
takes orders from the dining room and distributes them to the various stations; may also be performed by the sous-chef de partie.
Communard (staff cook)
prepares the meal for the restaurant staff.
Garçon de cuisine ("kitchen boy")
in larger restaurants, performs preparatory and auxiliary work for support.
commis de débarrasseur (busser)
clearing tables, taking dirty dishes to the dishwasher, setting tables, refilling

== Summary table ==
English	French	IPA	Responsibilities
Sauté chef	saucier	[sosje]	Sautéed items and their sauce. (The highest position of the stations.)
Fish chef	poissonnier	[pwasɔnje]	Fish dishes, and often fish butchering, and their sauces. (May be combined with the saucier position.)
Roast chef	rôtisseur	[ʁotisœʁ]	Roasted and braised meats, and their sauces.
Grill chef	grillardin	[ɡʁijaʁdɛ̃]	Grilled foods. (May be combined with the rotisseur.)
Fry chef	friturier	[fʁityʁje]	Fried items. (May be combined with the rotisseur.)
Entrée preparer	entremétier	[ɑ̃tʁəmetje]	Hot appetizers and often the soups, vegetables, pastas and starches.
Soup chef	potager	[pɔtaʒe]	Soups. (May be handled by the entremétier.)
Vegetable chef	légumier	[legymje]	Vegetables. (May be handled by the entremétier.)
Roundsman	tournant	[tuʁnɑ̃]	Fills in as needed on stations in the kitchen, a.k.a. the swing cook.
Pantry chef	garde manger	[ɡaʁd mɑ̃ʒe]	Cold foods: salads, cold appetizers, pâtés and other charcuterie items.
Butcher	boucher	[buʃe]	Butchers meats, poultry, and sometimes fish and breading.
Pastry chef	pâtissier	[patisje]	Baked goods and plated desserts, including pastries, cakes, and breads. May manage a separate team and department.

== See also ==
- Chef
- List of restaurant terminology
- Waiting staff
- Maître d'hôtel, a front of house head

== Notes ==
=== Sources ===
- The Culinary Institute of America (2006). The Professional Chef (8th ed.). Hoboken, New Jersey: John Wiley & Sons. ISBN 978-0-7645-5734-7.
- Dominé, André, ed. (1998). Culinaria France. Cologne: Könemann Verlagsgesellschaft mbh. ISBN 978-3-8331-1129-7.
