= Chef de partie =

Restaurant leadership position

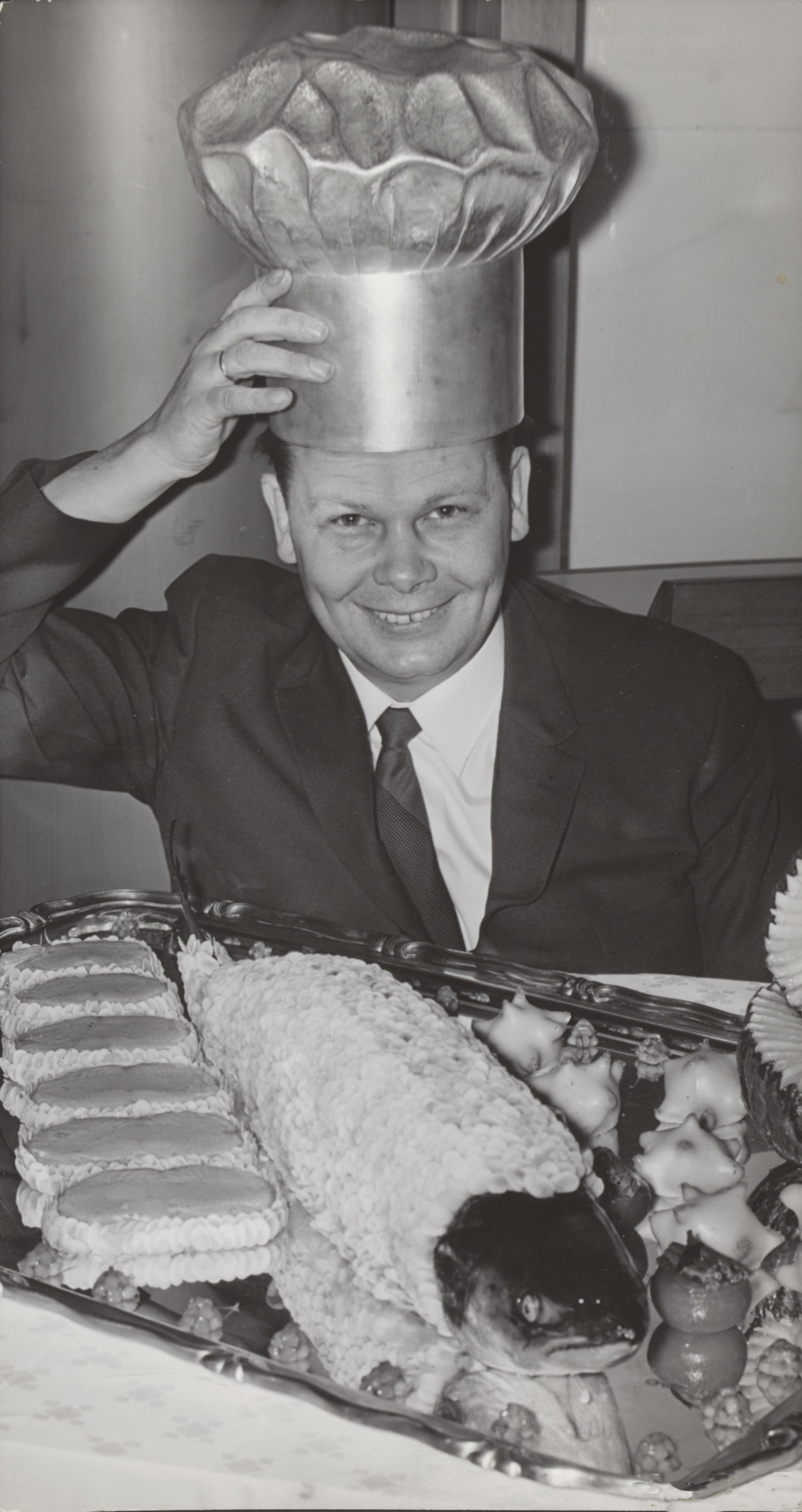
- C. W. van Dusschoten, a chef de partie (1966)

Occupation
- Names: Station chef, line cook
- Occupation type: Profession
- Activity sectors: Single department

A chef de partie, station chef, or line cook is a chef in charge of a particular area of production in a restaurant. In large kitchens, each chef de partie might have several cooks or assistants, sometimes referred to as demi-chefs, who operate in specific stations.

In most kitchens, however, the chef de partie is the only worker in that department. Line cooks are often divided into a hierarchy of their own, starting with "first cook", then "second cook", and continuing as needed by the establishment.

== Station chef titles ==
Station chefs who are part of the brigade system:

English	French	IPA	Responsibilities
Sauté chef	saucier	[sosje]	Sautéed items and their sauce. (The highest position of the stations.)
Fish chef	poissonnier	[pwasɔnje]	Fish dishes, and often fish butchering, and their sauces. (May be combined with the saucier position.)
Roast chef	rôtisseur	[ʁotisœʁ]	Roasted and braised meats, and their sauces.
Grill chef	grillardin	[ɡʁijaʁdɛ̃]	Grilled foods. (May be combined with the rotisseur.)
Fry chef	friturier	[fʁityʁje]	Fried items. (May be combined with the rotisseur.)
Entrée preparer	entremétier	[ɑ̃tʁəmetje]	Hot appetizers and often the soups, vegetables, pastas and starches.
Soup chef	potager	[pɔtaʒe]	Soups. (May be handled by the entremétier.)
Vegetable chef	légumier	[legymje]	Vegetables. (May be handled by the entremétier.)
Roundsman	tournant	[tuʁnɑ̃]	Fills in as needed on stations in the kitchen, a.k.a. the swing cook.
Pantry chef	garde manger	[ɡaʁd mɑ̃ʒe]	Cold foods: salads, cold appetizers, pâtés and other charcuterie items.
Butcher	boucher	[buʃe]	Butchers meats, poultry, and sometimes fish and breading.
Pastry chef	pâtissier	[patisje]	Baked goods and plated desserts, including pastries, cakes, and breads. May manage a separate team and department.
