= Garde manger =

Cool, ventilated area for food

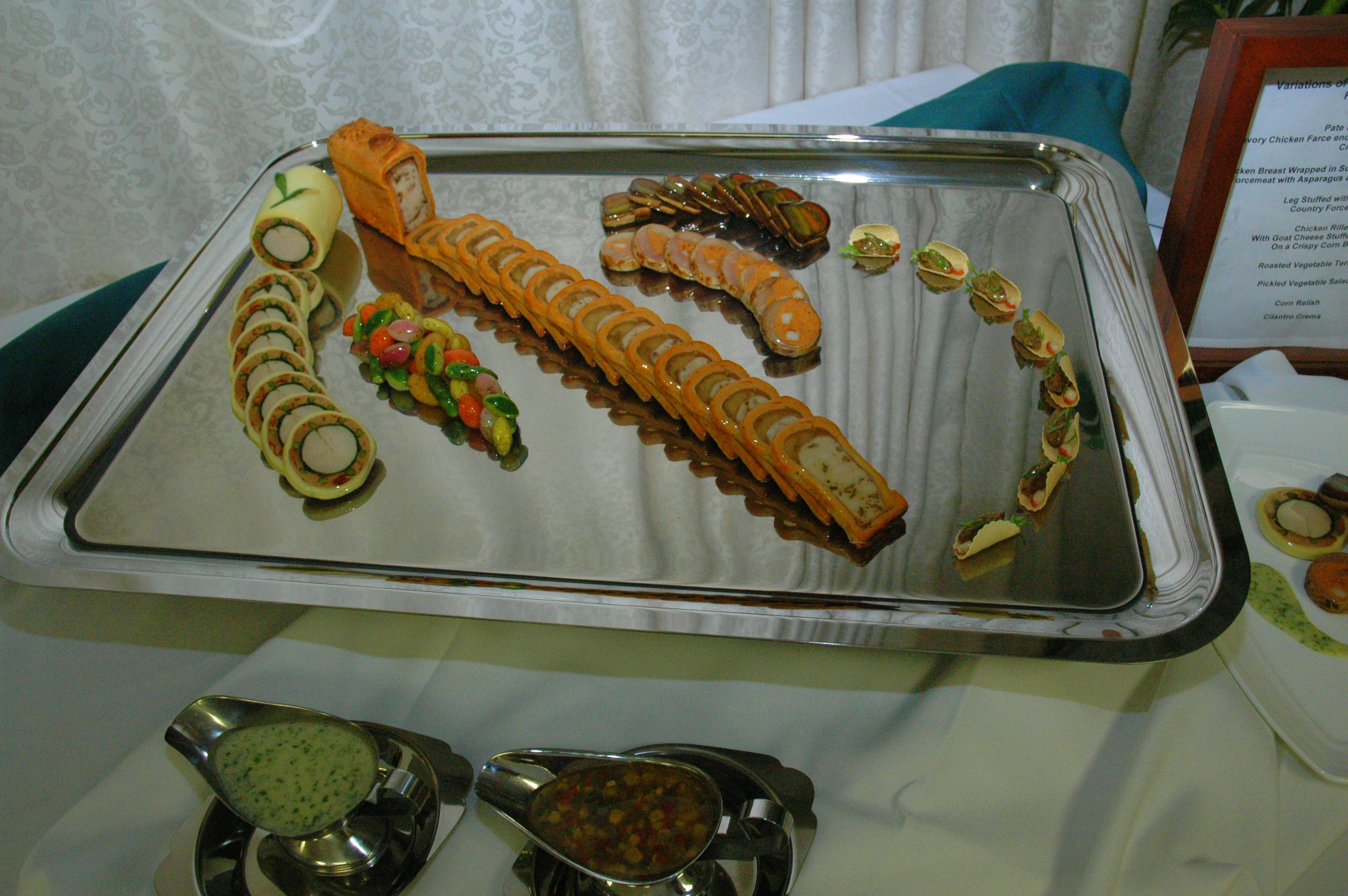
A contemporary terrine and galantine platter

A garde manger (French: [gaʁd mɑ̃ʒe]) is a cool, well-ventilated area where savory cold dishes (such as salads, hors d'œuvres, appetizers, canapés, pâtés, and terrines) are prepared and other foods are stored under refrigeration.

The person in charge of this area, and all of the savory cold foods served by the restaurant, is known as the chef garde manger, or pantry chef. Larger hotels and restaurants may have garde manger staff to perform additional duties, such as creating decorative elements of buffet presentation like ice carving and edible centerpieces.

== History ==
A chaud-froid display piece. Garde manger chefs are responsible for chaud-froid platters on buffets.

The term garde manger (French for larder) originated in pre-Revolutionary France, where large, wealthy households designated a kitchen manager to supervise the use and storage of large amounts of foodstuffs. The term garde manger literally means 'keeping to eat'. The main focus of the work was food preservation. The work included drying, salting, and smoking foods, as well as making cheese.

The term garde manger is also related to the cold rooms inside castles and manor houses where the food was stored. These food storage areas were usually located in the lower levels, since the cool basement-like environment was ideal for storing food. These cold storage areas developed over time into the modern cold kitchen.

With the development of classical French cuisine under the influence of François Pierre La Varenne and his 1651 book Le cuisinier françois, the garde manger also took on fresh fruits and vegetables.

Most merchants who worked outside noble manors at this time were associated with a guild, an association of persons of the same trade formed for their mutual aid and protection. Guilds developed training programs for their members, thereby preserving their knowledge and skills. Charcuterie was the name of a guild that prepared and sold cooked items made from pigs. Through this organization, the methods of preparing hams, bacon, sausages, pâtés, and terrines were preserved. When the guild system was abolished in 1791 following the French Revolution of 1789, garde mangers took on the responsibility for tasks that had formerly been performed by charcutiers, who had difficulty competing with the versatile garde mangers due to the limited range of skills involved.

The position of "butcher" first developed as a specialty within the garde manger kitchen. As both the cost of and demand for animal meats increased, more space was required for the task of fabricating and portioning the raw meats. This increased need for space was due not only to an upswing in the volume of meat sales, but also to the need for separating raw meats from processed foods to avoid cross-contamination and the resulting possibility of foodborne illness.

In the late 1800s, Continental cuisine had expanded the work of the garde manger to include the preparation of elaborate buffets of cold food.

== Modern garde manger ==
Modern garde manger can refer to different things in the professional kitchen. In many restaurants, it is a station which is generally an entry-level cooking position within a restaurant, as it often involves preparing salads or other smaller plates which can be heated and quickly plated without significant experience. However, as a specialized position, the garde manger chef has a higher status in the 21st century, especially as salads and charcuterie became more popular with diners.

In other high-profile classically influenced restaurants and hotels, the position pertains to the classical preparations, which often include pâtés, terrines and elaborate aspics. In nouvelle cuisine, which shifted the standard food presentation approach from larger platters to individually pre-portioned plates, the garde manger is often responsible for arranging food decoratively on the plates.

Because meat is usually butchered elsewhere and delivered to the restaurant pre-packaged, garde manger chefs no longer prepare raw meat for cooking. As a result, the garde manger chef is focused more on creative elements.

In addition to working in restaurants, garde manger chefs are also employed on cruise ships, for room service and banquets in hotels, in private clubs, in school cafeterias, in grocery stores, delis, and other food shops, by caterers, by magazines and other publications who need food styling services, and in product development and testing. Others work for themselves in an artisanal food business.

The garde manger position is often referred to as "garmo" in kitchen slang.

== Job requirements ==
As with most hands-on cooking positions, a garde manger chef needs fine motor skills and physical stamina, as well as cooking skills and knowledge of food safety. As the artistic qualities of food presentation have become important, the chef must be able to produce foods that both taste good and look good.

Because the garde manger usually works with a larger team, interpersonal skills are necessary. Mathematical skills are necessary for scaling recipes, placing orders, and managing the budget. Organization and planning skills are used in both cooking (e.g., having the correct amount of each ingredient at the correct temperatures when the food is prepared) and preparation phases (e.g., knowing how long it will take to plate 200 individual salads and how much refrigerator space is needed to keep them cold until they are served).

== See also ==
- Brigade de cuisine
- Garnish (food)
- List of restaurant terminology
- Pantry
