= Chaudfroid sauce =

French culinary sauce

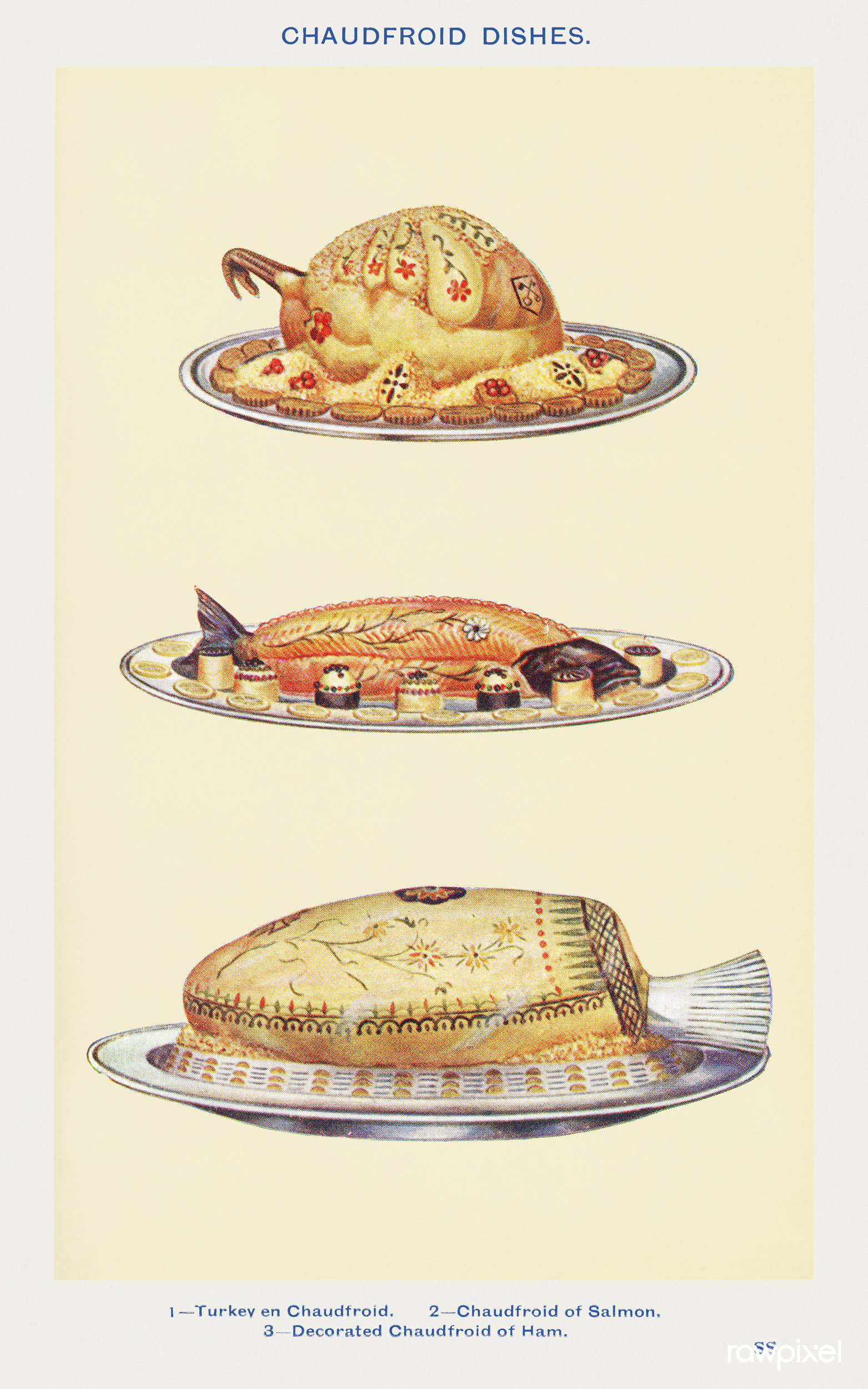
- Chaudfroid of turkey (top), salmon and ham
- Type: Sauce
- Created by: Louis-Alexandre Berthier
- Serving temperature: Cold
- Main ingredients: Boiled meat carcasses

Chaudfroid sauce, also spelled as chaud-froid sauce, is a culinary sauce that can be prepared using a reduction of boiled meat carcasses and other ingredients. Simpler preparations of the sauce omit the use of meat, with some variations using sauces such as espagnole, allemande or velouté as a base. Chaudfroid sauce is typically served cold, atop cold meats and cold meat-based dishes such as galantine and terrine.

== Etymology ==
The term "chaud froid" means "hot-cold" in French. The sauce's name is based upon the sauce being prepared hot, but served cold.

== History ==
It has been suggested that chaudfroid sauce was invented by Louis-Alexandre Berthier (20 November 1753 – 1 June 1815) of France, during Berthier's time under Napoleon.

== Overview ==
Chaudfroid sauce is a culinary sauce or gravy that can be prepared as a meat-based sauce by boiling the carcasses or bones of game meats or other meats such as poultry with herbs and spices. Vegetables such as onion and carrot have also been used. After cooking, the reduced sauce mixture is strained and gelatin is then added to provide viscosity. Chaudfroid sauce is used for several meats and meat-based dishes that are served cold, including meats such as fish, poultry, rabbit, venison, partridge, pheasant, duck and hard-boiled eggs, in which the cold sauce is used to coat the cold meat. Chaudfroid sauce has also been used as a topping for cold galantine, terrine and sweetbread dishes. The sauce serves to add flavor to meats and dishes and to decorate them. Chaudfroid sauce can provide the appearance of smoothness to meats, and such dishes are sometimes garnished with parsley or watercress atop the sauce.

== Simpler preparations ==
Chaudfroid sauce can be prepared using a pre-made fumet (reduced stock) from meats and game meats, along with ingredients such as demi glace, liquid essence of truffles, and Port or Madeira wine, which is cooked and reduced to a sauce consistency.

Some simpler preparations of chaudfroid sauce omit the use of meat, and these can be prepared as a brown sauce, a white sauce and as a red sauce using tomato purée. A simpler preparation of chaudfroid sauce without the use of meat can be made by using espagnole sauce, adding ingredients such as aspic jelly, gelatin, cream and sherry to it, and cooking the mixture. Another simpler preparation technique that lacks meat involves the use of allemande sauce or velouté sauce and other ingredients.

A sweet version of chaudfroid sauce is also prepared without meat, using cream or milk, sugar, gelatin and various ingredients such as kirsch, vanilla, rum or fruit pulp. The sweet sauce can be used to coat foods such as apples, pears, apricots and peaches.

Mayonnaise chaudfroid, also referred to as mayonnaise collée, is a simple version of the sauce prepared using mayonnaise and aspic jelly.

== See also ==
- Aspic
- List of sauces
