= Meat-jelly Festival =

Annual event in Hungary

The Kocsonya Festival is an annual event held in the city of Miskolc, Hungary, celebrating the end of the winter season. The event consists of concerts, performances and stores where visitors can buy traditional Hungarian products and fare. The festival is the largest gastronomic event in Hungary, with an overwhelming range of cuisine from Miskolc and across the country.

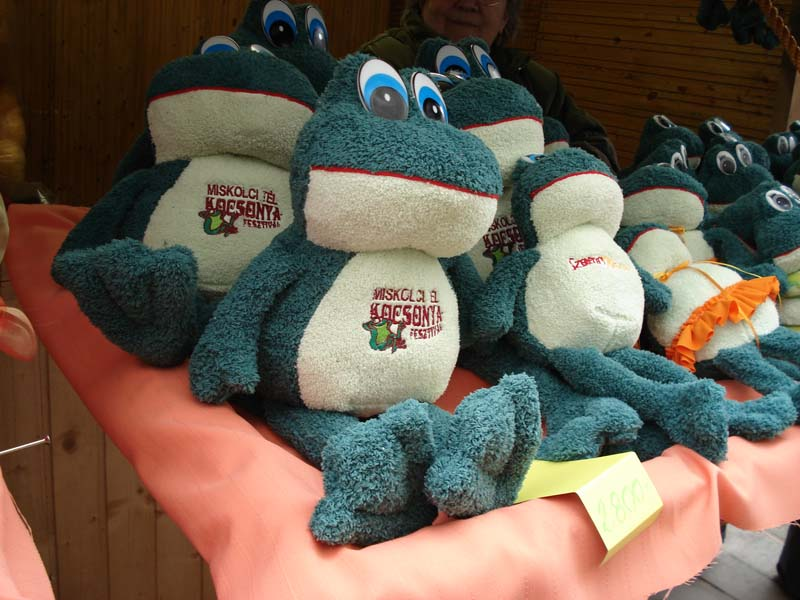
Miskolc Kocsonyafesztival 05

== History of the festival ==
The festival has been held annually since 1999. Initially part of 'Vendégségben Miskolcon', a project to enhance the attraction of Miskolc with both international and domestic tourists, the festival has since grown to become a large public event in its own right. In 2001 the first 'Kocsonya Ball' was organized, followed in 2002 by the 'Celebration of Kocsonya'. In 2003 the event was extended again by a 'Kocsonya Gala', and since 2004 the program has been known as the 'Miskolc Winter Kocsonya Festival'.

== Legend of kocsonya ==
The proverb "Blinks like frog in the Miskolc kocsonya" dates from the nineteenth century. It is based on a legend which describes a careless waiter who didn't realize that a frog had jumped into the kocsonya, which was then left in a cellar in order to congeal. The waiter then served the meat jelly together with the frog which, the legend says, was still blinking. This gave rise to the expression “blinks like a frog in the Miskolc meat jelly”, referring to a glazed look of dumbfounded surprise. After the incident the story was dispersed in the form of postcards and gifts all over the country.

== Kocsonya ==
Kocsonya is a traditional cold meal which can be found in many European nations' cuisine. The recipe appears in the oldest cookbook, written in France in 1395.

=== Ingredients of kocsonya ===
Kocsonya is a Hungarian meat jelly similar to aspic that is served as a chilled main course. It is traditionally made from pork products such as pig ears, pig tail, pig's trotters, and pork skin. Spices include red pepper, salt, black pepper, garlic, hot red pepper, and onion.

== See also ==
- Aspic

== Notes ==
- "'More than a legend...' – MEAT JELLY FESTIVAL - Kocsonyafesztivál". Kocsonyafesztival.hu. Archived from the original on 2012-10-14.
- "A fesztivál története - Kocsonyafesztivál". Kocsonyafesztival.hu. 2012-02-26. Archived from the original on 2012-08-23.
- "Kocsonya (Meat jelly/Aspic)". 2015-01-06.
