= Saucier =

Type of chef

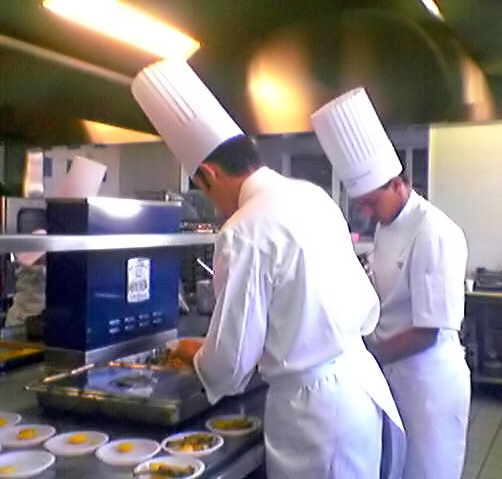
Sauciers-in-training

A saucier (French pronunciation: [sosje]) or sauté chef is a position in the classical brigade style kitchen. It can be translated into English as sauce chef. In addition to preparing sauces, the saucier prepares stews, hot hors d'œuvres, and sautés food to order. Although it is often considered the highest position of the station cooks, the saucier is typically still tertiary to the chef and sous-chef.

== Escoffier definition ==
In Georges Auguste Escoffier's system of the classic kitchen brigade, outlined in his Guide Culinaire, the saucier is "responsible for all sautéed items and most sauces".

== See also ==
- List of restaurant terminology
