= Aspic =

Savoury jelly dish

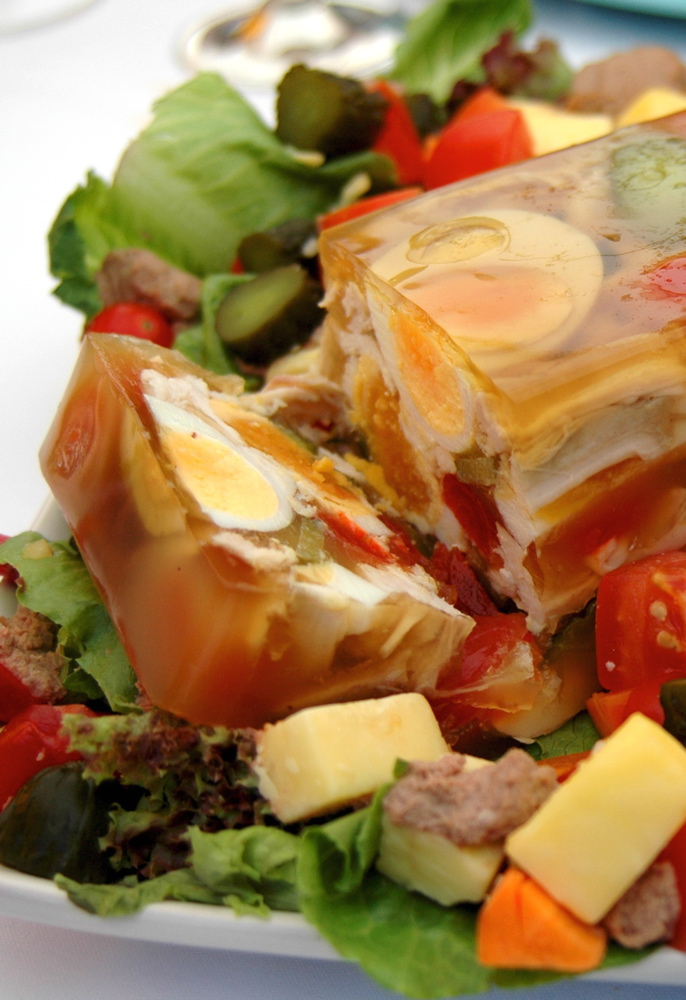
Aspic with chicken and eggs

Aspic (/ˈæspɪk/) or meat jelly is a savory gelatin made with a meat stock or broth, set in a mold to encase other ingredients. These often include pieces of meat, seafood, vegetable, or eggs. Aspic is also sometimes referred to as aspic gelée or aspic jelly. In its simplest form, aspic is essentially a gelatinous version of conventional soup.

== History ==
Meat aspics were made before fruit- and vegetable-flavoured aspics. A poetic reference is given by the poet Ibrahim ibn al-Mahdi, who described in the 9th century a gelled dish prepared with Iraqi carp, as "like ruby on the platter, set in a pearl ... steeped in saffron thus, like garnet it looks, vibrantly red, shimmering on silver". By the Middle Ages, cooks had discovered that a thickened meat broth could be made into a jelly. The Dongjing Meng Hua Lu mentioned two types of meat aspic in the restaurants of Kaifeng, the Northern Song dynasty capital: "Crystalline Sliced Meat" (水晶膾) and "Jiangchi" (薑豉).

A detailed recipe for aspic is found in Le Viandier, written around 1375.

In the early 19th century, the French chef Marie-Antoine Carême created Chaudfroid sauce, the name referencing foods that were prepared hot and served cold. Aspic was used as a chaudfroid sauce in many cold fish and poultry meals, where it added moisture and flavour. Carême also invented various types of aspic and ways of preparing it. Aspics at this time were prepared with a jelly made in a time-consuming process of boiling calf's feet, or where available, alternatives such as agar or isinglass. The large time commitment meant aspics were rare, reserved for special guests or the ill. By the 1870s, boxed gelatin was available. Although this was more convenient, early products were not instant, requiring cooking the gelatin with eggs whites and their shells, before letting the gelatin drip through a specially designated bag.

In the 1890s, packaged gelatins gained commercial success for the first time in America. By the 1920s, a third of salads published in cookbooks contained gelatin elements, and a tomato aspic was among jellied products of the era. By the 1950s, meat aspic was a popular dinner staple, as were other gelatin-based dishes such as tomato aspic. Cooks showed off their aesthetic skills by creating inventive aspics.

== Uses ==
Aspic jelly may be colorless (white aspic) or contain various shades of amber. Aspic can be used to protect food from the air, to give food more flavor, or as a decoration. It can also be used to encase meats, preventing them from becoming spoiled. The gelatin keeps out air and bacteria, keeping the cooked meat or other ingredients fresh for longer. There are three types of aspic: delicate, sliceable, and inedible. The delicate aspic is soft. The sliceable aspic must be made in a terrine or in an aspic mold. It is firmer than the delicate aspic. The inedible aspic is never for consumption and is usually for decoration. Aspic is often used to glaze food pieces in food competitions to make the food glisten and make it more appealing to the eye. Foods dipped in aspic have a lacquered finish for a fancy presentation. Aspic can be cut into various shapes and be used as a garnish for deli meats or pâtés.

== Preparation ==
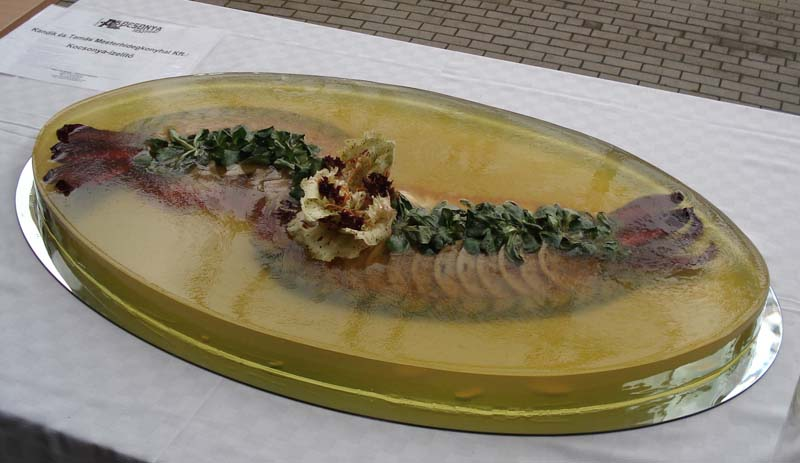
Fish in aspic

The preparation of pork jelly includes placing lean pork meat, trotters, rind, ears, and snout in a pot of cold water and letting it cook over a slow fire for three hours. The broth is allowed to cool, while also removing any undesirable fats. Subsequently, white vinegar and the juice of half an orange or lemon can be added to the meat so that it is covered. The entire mixture is then allowed to cool and gel. Bay leaves or chili can be added to the broth for added taste (the Romanian variety is based on garlic and includes no vinegar, orange, lemon, chili, bay leaves, etc.). However, there are many alternate ways of preparing pork jelly, such as the usage of celery, beef and even pig bones. Poultry jellies are made the same way as making pork jelly, but less water is added to compensate for lower natural gelatin content.

Almost any type of food can be set into aspics, and almost any type of meat (poultry or fish included) can be used to make gelatin, although in some cases, additional gelatin may be needed for the aspic to set properly. Stock can be clarified with egg whites and then filled and flavored just before the aspic sets. The most common are pieces of meat, seafood, eggs, fruits, or vegetables. Veal stock (in particular, stock from a boiled calf's foot) provides a great deal of gelatin, so other types of meat are often included when making stock.

Fish consommés usually have too little natural gelatin, so fish stock may be double-cooked or supplemented. Since fish gelatin melts at a lower temperature than the gelatins of other meats, fish aspic is more delicate and melts more readily in the mouth. Most fish stocks usually do not maintain a molded shape with their natural gelatin alone, so additional gelatin is added.

Vegetables have no natural gelatin. However, pectin serves a similar purpose in culinary applications such as jams and jellies.

== Global variations ==
=== Pork jelly ===
Pork jelly is an aspic made from low-grade cuts of pork, such as trotters, that contain a significant proportion of connective tissue. Pork jelly is a popular appetizer and is sometimes prepared in using lean cuts of pork, with or without pig leftovers (which are substituted with store-bought gelatin). It is very popular in countries in Central and Eastern Europe, and in the Balkans. In Russia, Belarus, Georgia and Ukraine, it is known as kholodets, kholodne during Christmas or Easter. In Hungary it is called kocsonya. In Russia, kholodets is a traditional winter and especially Christmas and New Year's dish, which is eaten with chrain (horseradish paste) or mustard. It is also eaten in Vietnam (thịt nấu đông) during Lunar New Year. The meat in pork pies is preserved using pork jelly.

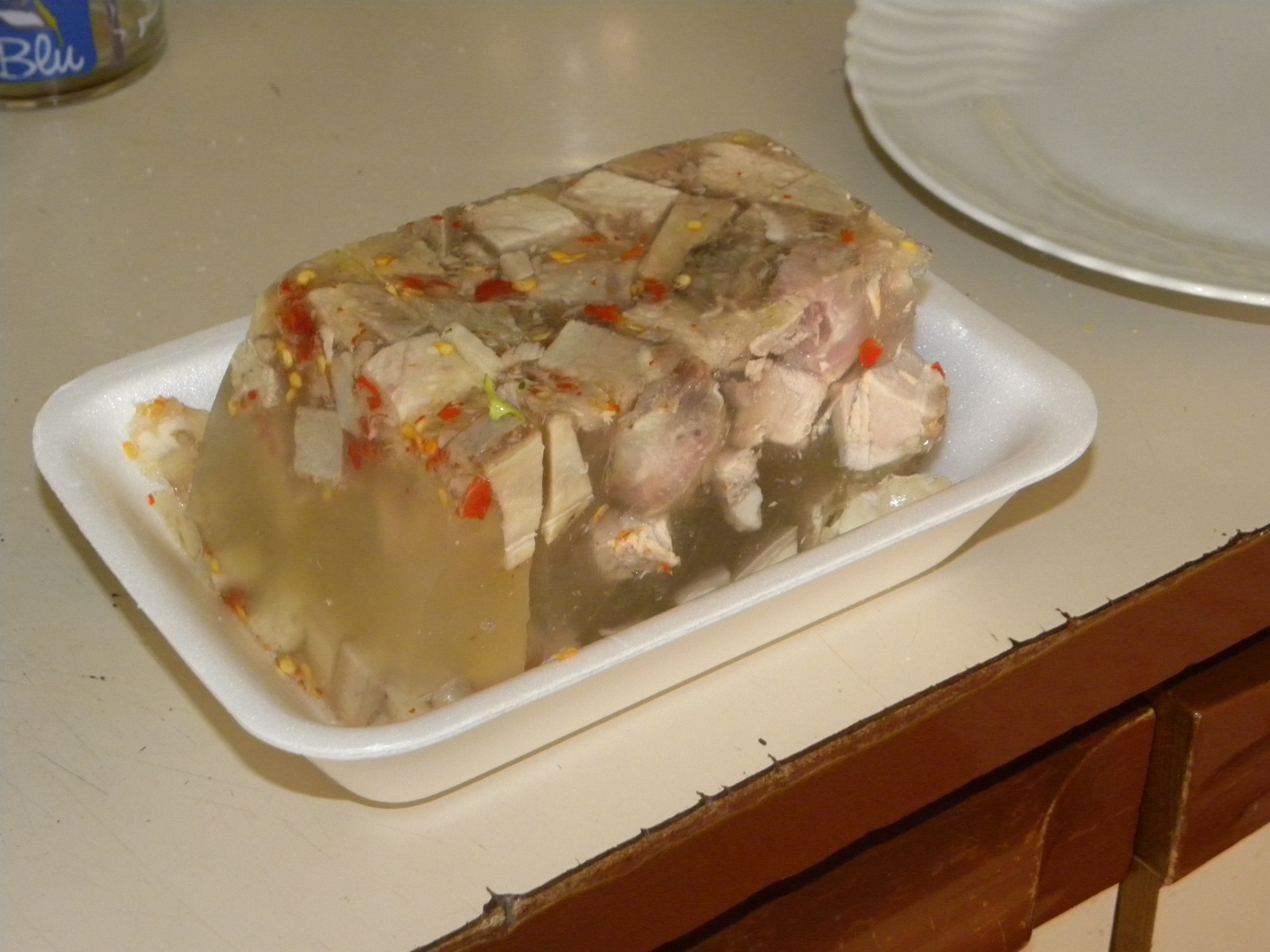
Pork jelly

=== Pihtije ===
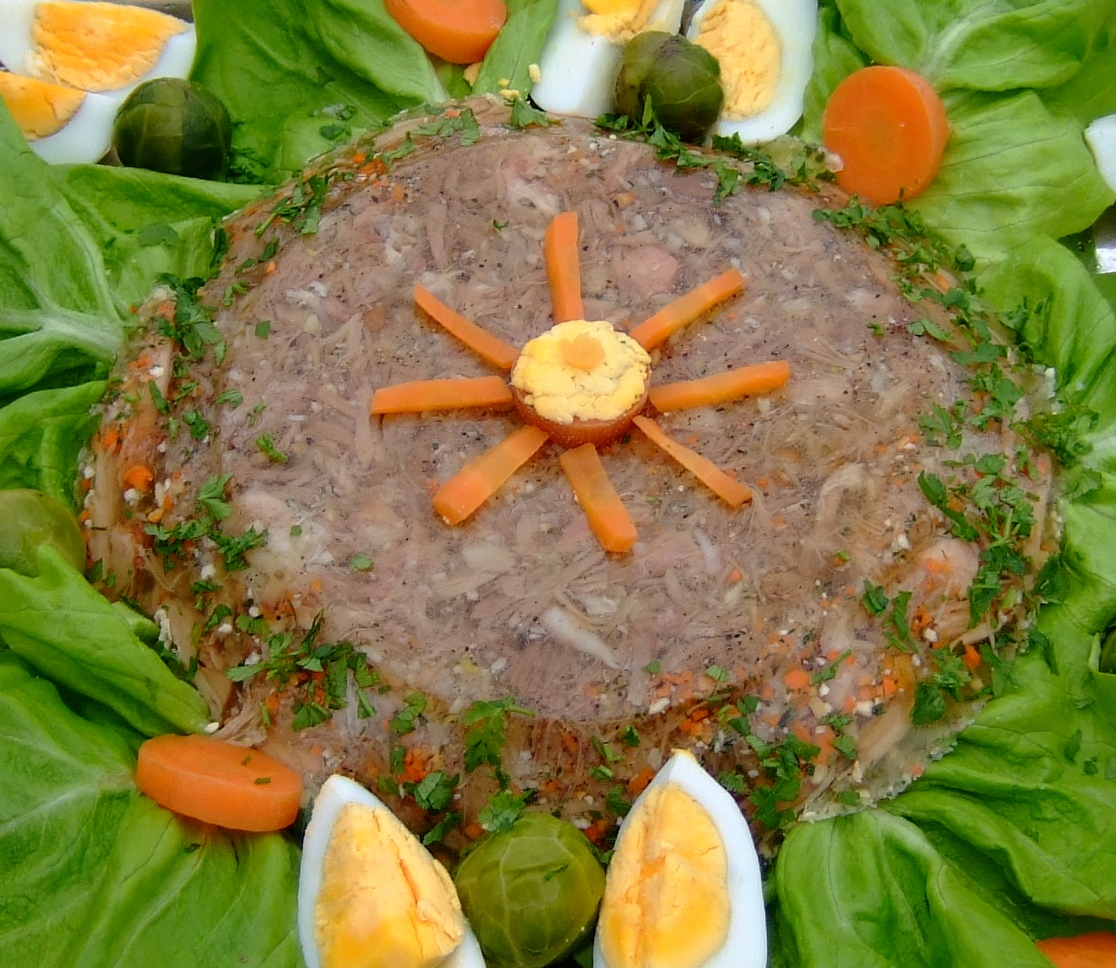
Pihtije on lettuce with eggs

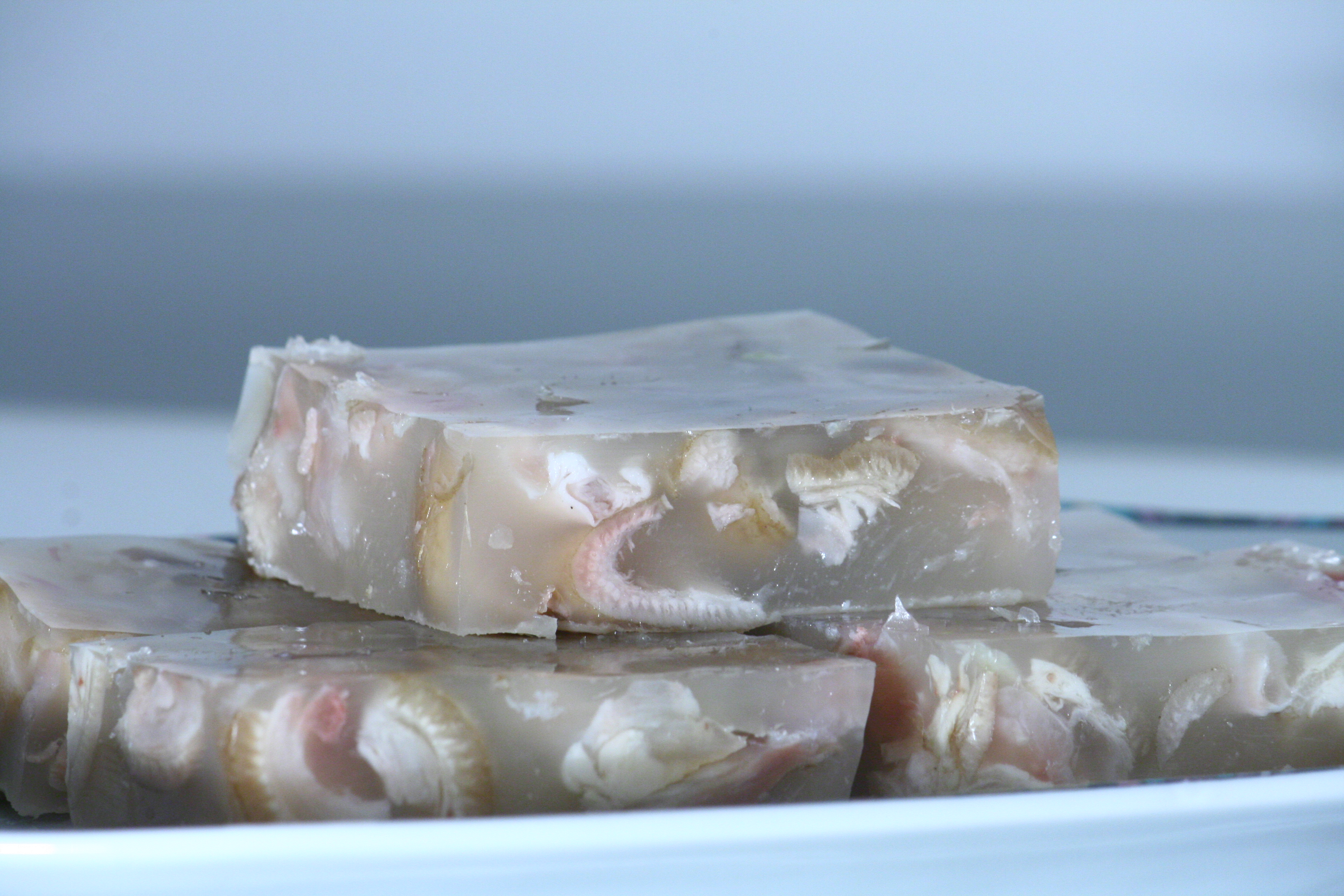
Pihtije cubes

Pihtije (Serbian: пихтије), pivtija (Macedonian: пивтија), pača (Bulgarian: пача) is an aspic-like dish, generally made from lamb, chicken or pork meat, such as the head, shank, or hock, made into a semi-consistent gelatinous cake-like form. In some varieties, chicken is used instead of pork. Some recipes also include smoked meat and are well spiced.

Pihtije is commonly just one component of the traditional meal (or an appetizer), although it can be served as a main dish. It is usually accompanied by cold rakija (grape brandy), sauerkraut, and turšija (pickled cucumbers, dill, peppers, cauliflower, carrots etc.). When eaten in winter months, it is often consumed with other meat delicacies like kolenica (ham hock) and heated liquor.

The recipe calls for the meat to be cleaned, washed, and then boiled for a short time, no longer than 10 minutes. Then the water is changed, and vegetables and spices are added. This is cooked until the meat begins to separate from the bones, then the bones are removed, the meat stock is filtered, and the meat and stock are poured into shallow bowls.

Garlic is added as well as thin slices of tomatoes or green peppers (or something similar for decoration). It is left to sit in a cold spot, such as a fridge or outside if the weather is cold enough. It congeals into jelly and can be cut into cubes (it is often said that good pihtijas are "cut like glass"). These cubes can be sprinkled with various spices or herbs as desired before serving.

Pihtije is usually cut and served in equal sized cubes.

Pihtije are frequently used in slavas and other celebratory occasions with Serbs.

=== Romanian and Moldovan piftie ===
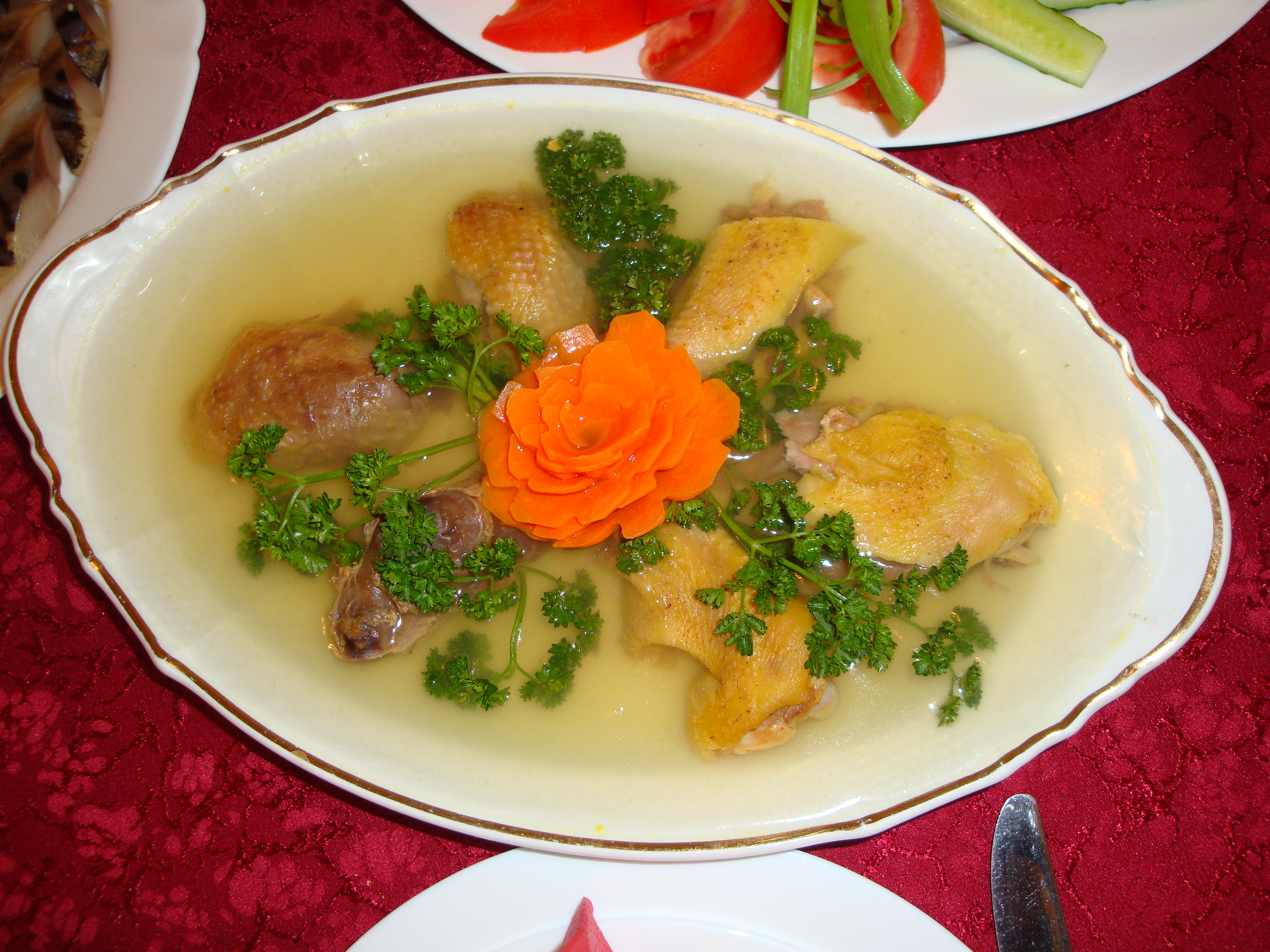
Moldovan chicken răcitură

Romanian and Moldovan piftie is also called răcitură (plural răcituri), derived from the Romanian rece, meaning cold. Piftie has a different method of preparation. It is usually made with pig's trotter (but turkey or chicken meat can also be used), carrots and other vegetables, boiled to make a soup with high gelatin content. The broth containing gelatin is poured over the boiled meat and mashed garlic in bowls, the mixture being then cooled to become a jelly.

The piftie or răcitură is associated with seasonal practices of traditional rural cuisine, where its preparation was linked to the winter slaughter of pigs, when natural gelatin-rich cuts were readily available. Because it is consumed cold and requires prolonged cooling, it became emblematic of the winter festive table. Ethnographic and culinary sources describe it as a customary dish prepared for major winter celebrations, particularly Christmas and the period leading up to Epiphany, when it is traditionally eaten as part of a larger cycle of ritual foods marking the winter holidays in Romania and Moldova.

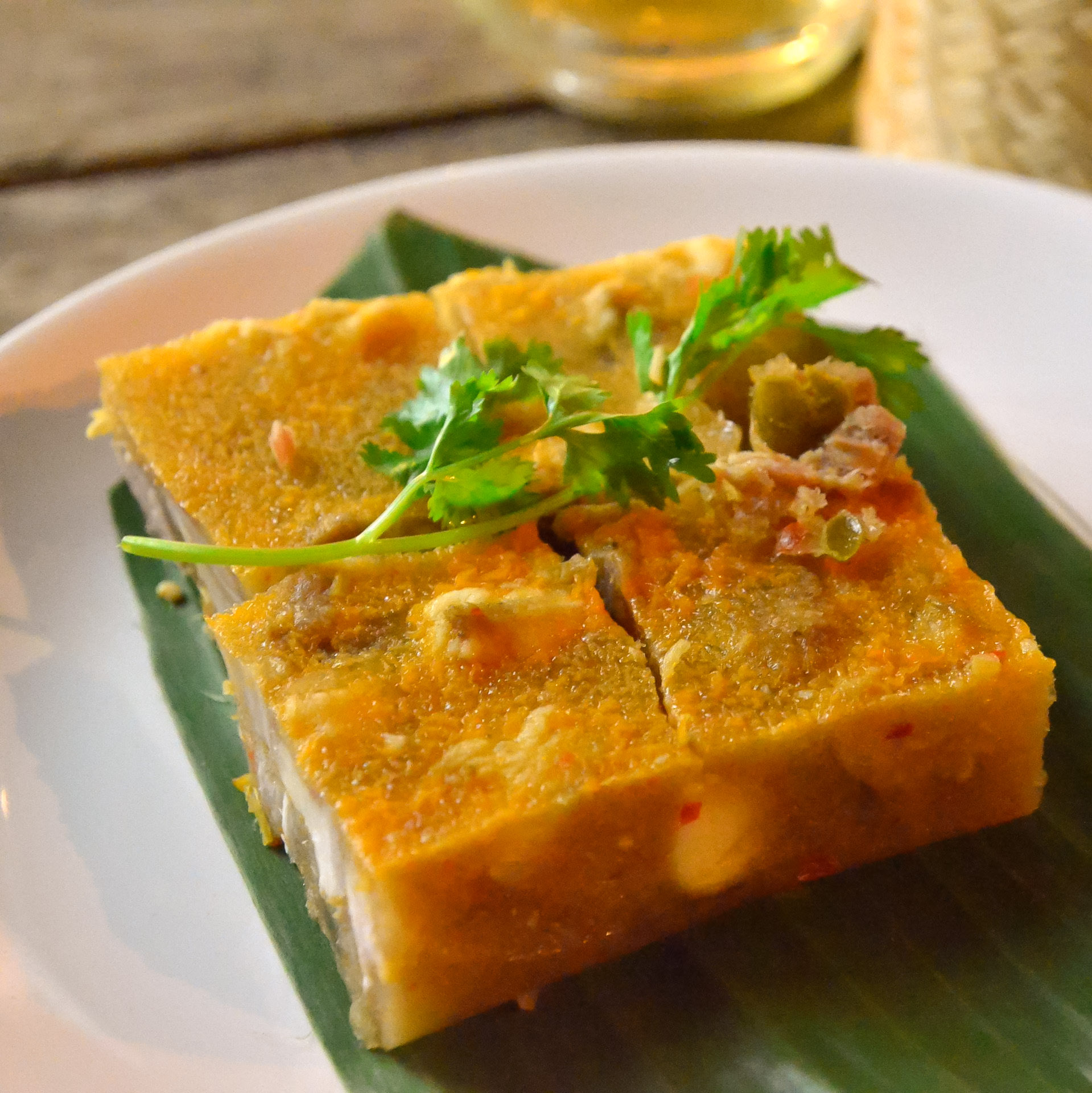
A specialty of northern Thailand, kaeng kradang is a Thai curry aspic.

=== Korea ===
Jokpyeon (족편) is a dish prepared by boiling beef and pork cuts with high collagen content such as the head, skin, tail, cow's trotters, or other cuts in water for a long time. The resulting stewing liquid sets to form a jelly-like substance when cooled.

=== Nepal ===
Among the Newars of Kathmandu Valley in Nepal, buffalo meat jelly, known as ta khaa, is a major component of the winter festivity gourmet. It is eaten in combination with fish aspic (sanyaa khunna), which is made from dried fish and buffalo meat stock, soured, and containing a heavy mix of spices and condiments. Among non-Newars, the dish is known as thalthale.

=== Poland ===
In Central, Eastern, and Northern Europe, aspic often takes the form of pork jelly and is popular around the Christmas and Easter holidays. In Poland, certain meats, fish and vegetables are set in aspic, creating a dish called galareta.

=== Eastern Europe ===
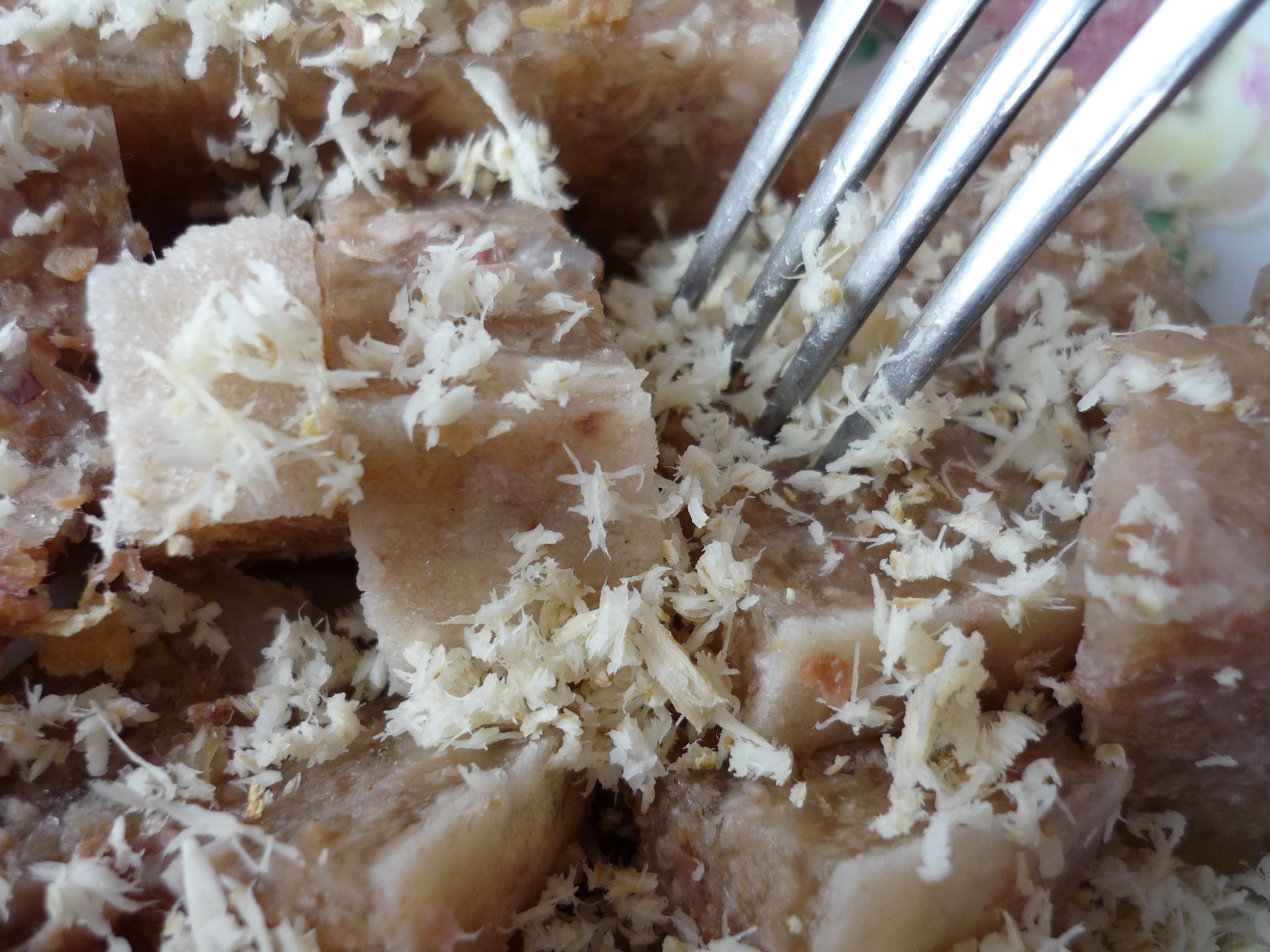
Kholodets with chopped horseradish

In Belarusian, Russian, and Ukrainian cuisine, a meat aspic dish is called kholodets (Belarusian: халадзец [xalaˈd͡zʲɛt͡s]; Russian: холодец [xəlɐˈdʲets]; Ukrainian: холодець [xoloˈdɛtsʲ]; also written as holodetz outside these countries) derived from the word kholod meaning "cold". In some areas it is called studen' (студень) or studenets (Ukrainian: студенець, romanized: studenets), derived from a different root with a similar meaning.

The dish is part of winter holiday celebrations such as the traditional Russian New Year or Christmas meal. However, modern refrigeration allows for its year-round production, and it is not uncommon to see kholodets on a Russian table in summer.

Kholodets is usually made by boiling the bones and meat rich in collagen for about 5–8 hours to produce a thick and fatty broth, with the collagen hydrolizing into the natural gelatin, mixed with salt, pepper, and other spices. The meat is then separated from the bones, minced, recombined with the broth, dressed with the slices of boiled egg and herbs like parsley and cooled until it solidifies into a jelly. Kholodets is usually eaten with chrain or mustard.

In Ukraine's Poltava Oblast, a popular traditional variety of kholodets used to be made from crayfish.

=== Croatia ===
The Croatian version of this dish is called hladetina (hladno meaning cold). Variants range from one served in a dish with rather delicate gelatin, to tlačenica more resembling the German sulze, a kind of head cheese.

=== Slovenia ===
In Slovenia, aspic is known as žolca (derived from the German sülze, meaning head cheese) or tlačenka in Slovene. It is traditionally served at Easter.

=== Slovakia ===
In Slovakia, huspenina is a traditional aspic-like dish made with ox or pork. A comparable dish, tlačenka, is served all year, but especially on Easter.

=== Denmark ===
In Denmark, aspic is called sky and is made from meat juices, gelatin, and sometimes mushrooms. Aspic is almost solely eaten as a topping for cold cuts or rullepølse on Danish open faced sandwiches called smørrebrød. It is a key ingredient in Dyrlægens natmad, a dish combining leverpostej, sliced salt beef and onions. Aspic, with or without mushrooms, is an easy-to-find product in most supermarkets.

=== Georgia ===
Mujuji or muzhuzhi (Georgian: მუჟუჟი) is a traditional Georgian dish of cold jellied pork. Its ingredients include pork meat, tails, ears, feet, carrots, vinegar, garlic, herbs, onions, roots, bay leaves, allspice, and cinnamon. In some recipes, the dish is cooked in two separate processes, slightly pickled with wine vinegar and spiced with tarragon and basil. One part contains pork feet, tails and ears; the other contains the lean meat of piglets. They are combined into one dish, chilled and served with green onions and spicy herbs.

=== Belgium ===
Rog in 't zuur or rog in zure gelei is a Flemish traditional recipe to preserve ray wings which are otherwise notoriously quick to spoil. Ray wings are poached in a fish stock with vinegar, spices and onions, then preserved by adding gelatin to the stock and covering the fish with the gelatin stock. In this manner the fish would keep 2–4 days without refrigeration. The dish is served cold with bread for breakfast or as a snack, or can be served as an appetizer.

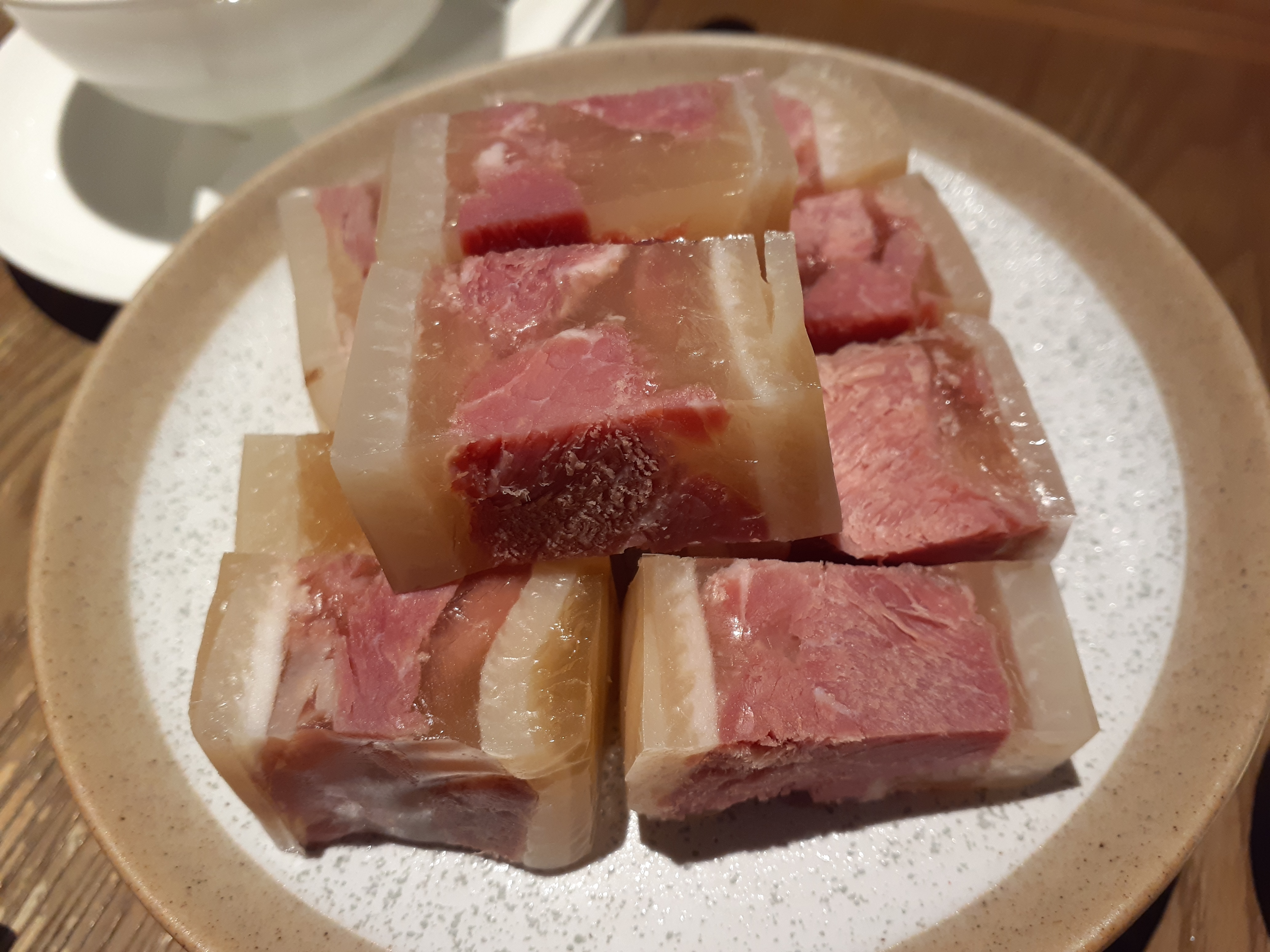
Salted pork in jelly

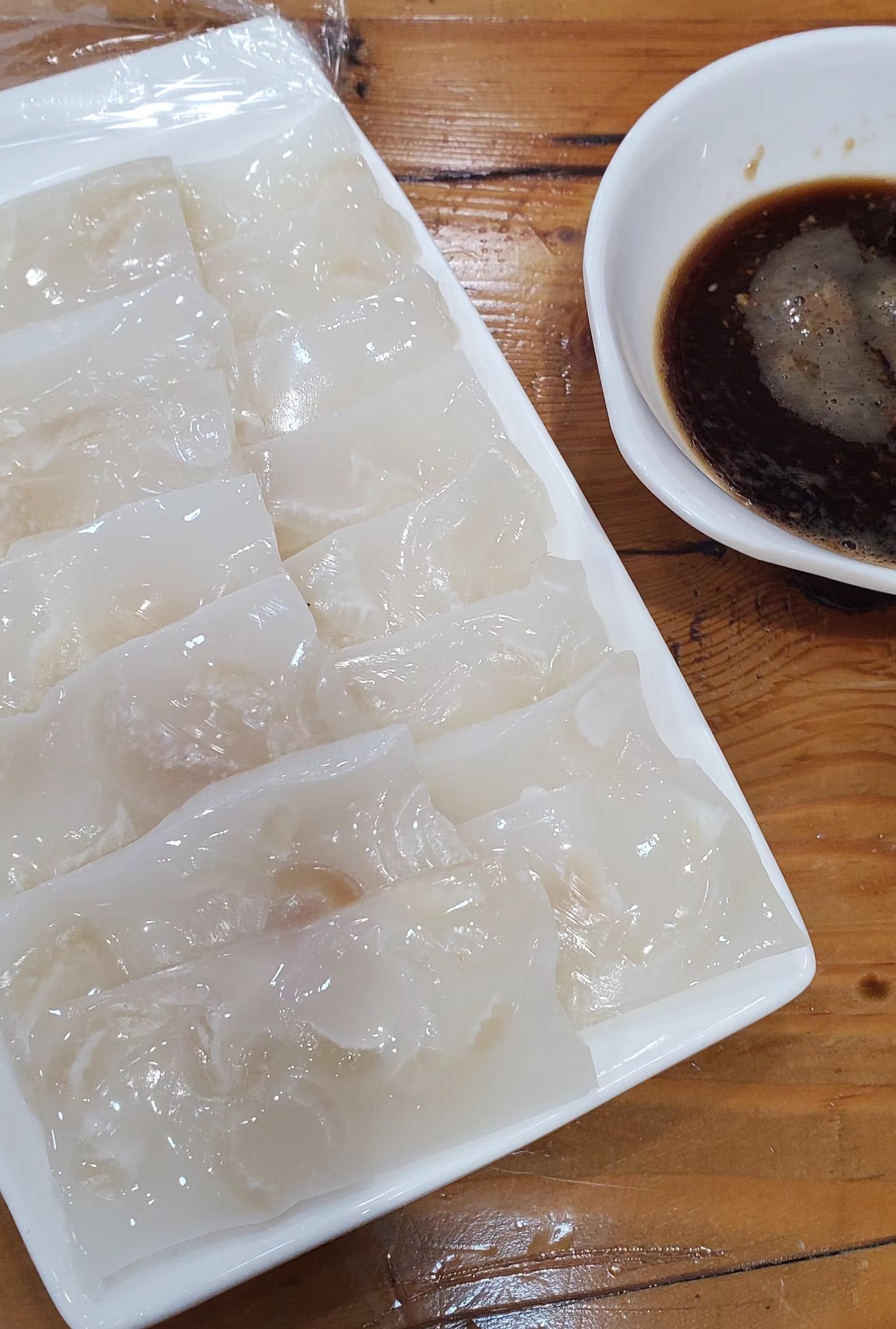
Pídòng with pork rind or húndòng, served with vinegar seasoning

=== China ===
In Northern China, pídòng (Chinese: 皮冻) is a traditional dish served in winter, especially during the Chinese New Year. This Chinese dish of aspic is usually made by boiling pork rind in water. The dishes cooled without pork rind are called qīngdòng (Chinese: 清冻) while those containing pork rind in the aspic are called húndòng (Chinese: 浑冻).

In Zhenjiang, aspic using pig trotters is called shuǐjīng xiáoròu ('salted pork in jelly'). The dish has two layers of meat. The upper layer, about half an inch thick, is 'pigskin aspic', while the lower layer is half red and half white, made from boiling pig's trotter and pigskin until gelled, forming 'meat aspic'. The traditional method of preparing the dish involves boiling the trotter with saltpeter, resulting in a crimson hue. However, due to the use of saltpeter in food being banned, the modern approach is using German pork knuckles.

=== Vietnam ===
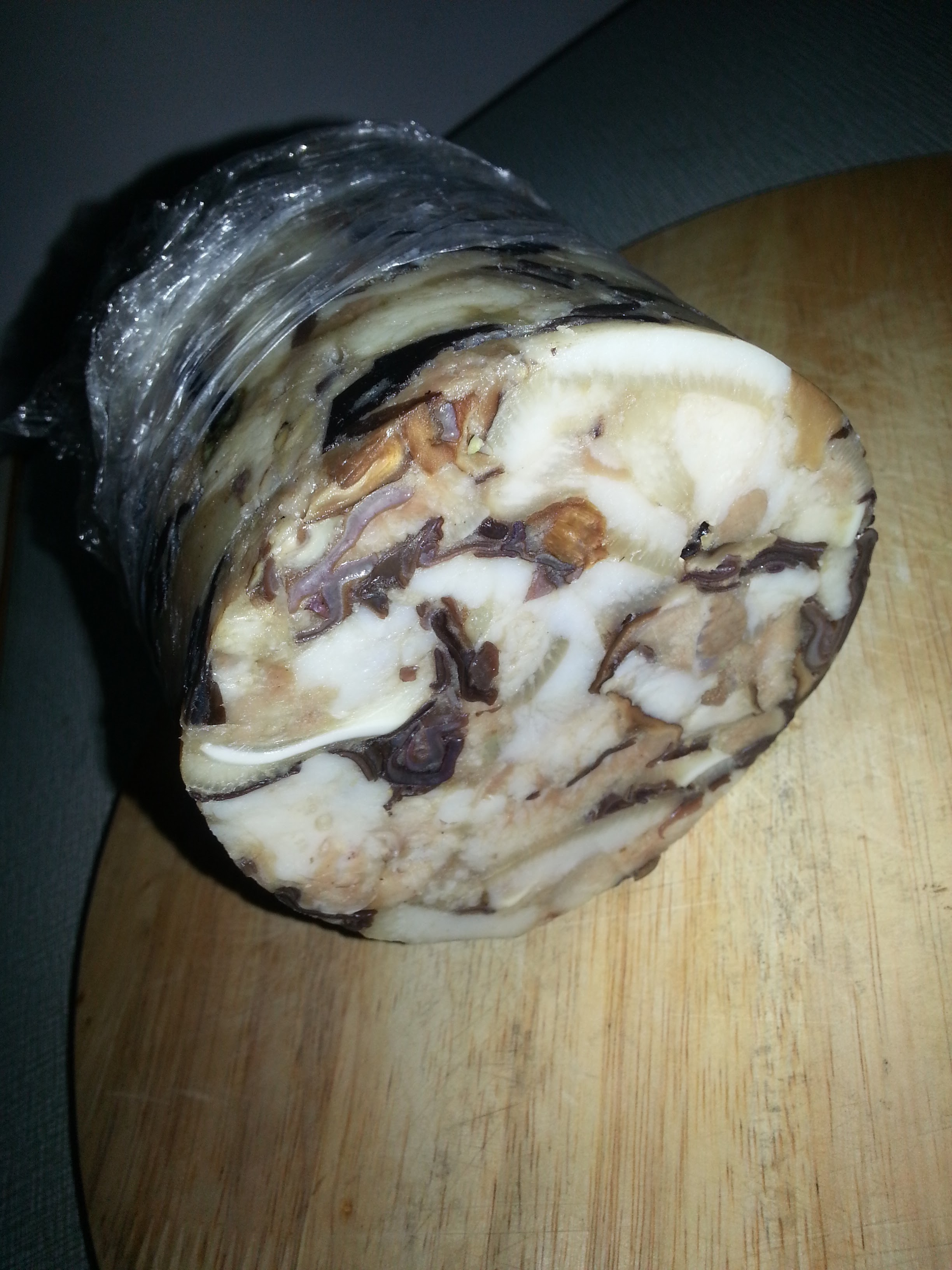
Vietnamese giò thủ

Giò thủ, giò tai, also known by another popular name giò xào, is one of the traditional Vietnamese sausage dishes with the main ingredient being stir-fried meat with some other ingredients, then wrapped and compressed. Originating in Northern Vietnam and now popular throughout the country, more or less similar forms of preparation like this dish also exist in many other cuisines around the world. Giò thủ is often made by families during the traditional Lunar New Year, and is sold at sausage shops in Vietnam most markets nationwide.

A more accurate variants of aspic in Vietnamese is called Thịt đông, or Vietnamese pork aspic.

== Nutrition ==
Aspic contains various nutrients such as iron, vitamin A, vitamin K, fatty acids, selenium, zinc, magnesium and phosphorus.

== See also ==
- Chaudfroid sauce
- Cretons
- Galantine
- Garde manger
- Head cheese
- Jell-O
- Kalvsylta
- Khash
- Meat-jelly Festival
- P'tcha
- Pâté
- Pig's trotters
- Terrine
