= Charcuterie =

Branch of cooking of prepared meat products, primarily from pork

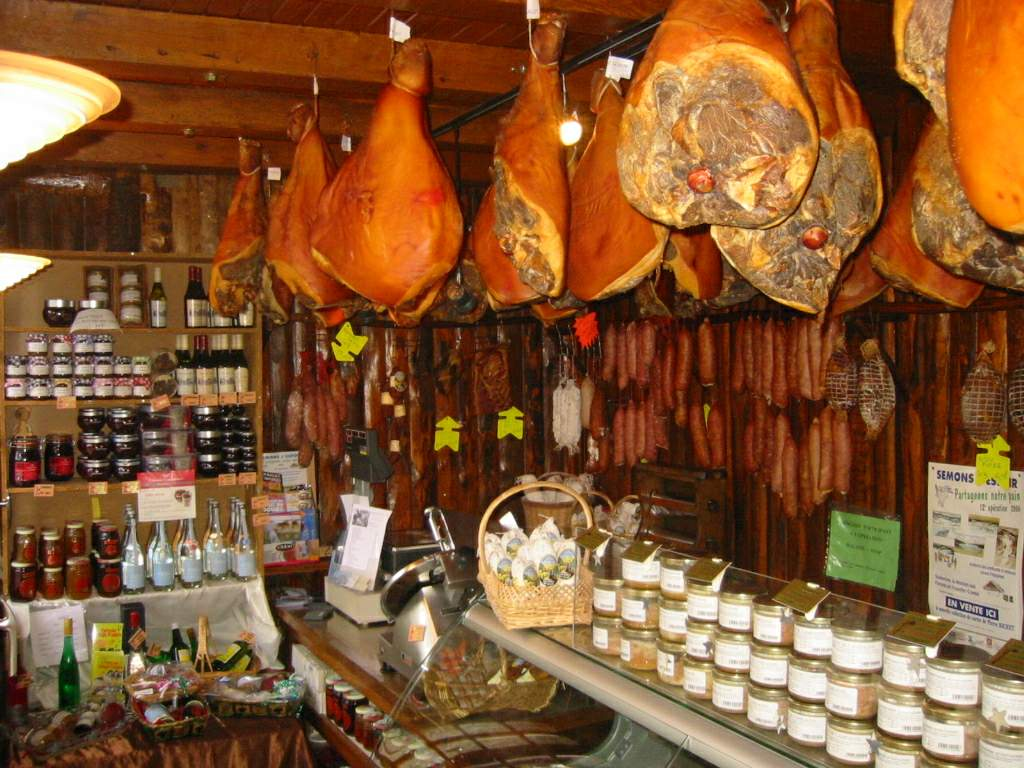
Charcuterie hanging in a French shop

Charcuterie (/ʃɑːrˈkuːtəri/, shar-KOO-tər-ee, also US: /ʃɑːrˌkuːtəˈriː/, -EE; French: [ʃaʁkyt(ə)ʁi]; from chair, 'flesh', and cuit, 'cooked') is a branch of French cuisine devoted to prepared meat products, such as bacon, ham, sausage, terrines, galantines, ballotines, pâtés, and confit, primarily from pork.

Charcuterie is part of the garde manger chef's repertoire. In larger restaurants, a dedicated specialist known as a charcutier may prepare charcuterie instead of the garde manger. Originally intended as a way to preserve meat before the advent of refrigeration, meats are prepared today for their flavors derived from the preservation processes.

== Terminology ==
The French word for a person who practices charcuterie is charcutier. The etymology of the word is the combination of chair and cuite, or cooked flesh. The Herbsts in Food Lover's Companion say, "it refers to the products, particularly (but not limited to) pork specialties such as pâtés, rillettes, galantines, crépinettes, etc., which are made and sold in a delicatessen-style shop, also called a charcuterie." Montagné in his 1938 edition of Larousse Gastronomique defines it as "[t]he art of preparing various meats, in particular pork, in order to present them in the most diverse ways".

== Products created with forcemeats ==
=== Forcemeat ===
Forcemeat is a mixture of ground, lean meat emulsified with fat. The emulsification can be accomplished by grinding, sieving, or puréeing the ingredients. The emulsification may either be smooth or coarse in texture, depending on the desired consistency of the final product. Forcemeats are used in the production of numerous items found in charcuterie. Meats commonly used in the production of forcemeats include pork, fish (pike, trout, or salmon), seafood, game meats (venison, boar, or rabbit), poultry, game birds, veal, and pork livers. Pork fatback is often used for the fat portion of forcemeat, as it has a somewhat neutral flavor.

In US usage, there are four basic styles of forcemeat. Straight forcemeats are made by progressively grinding equal parts pork and pork fat with a third dominant meat, which can be pork or another type of meat. The proteins are cubed, and then seasoned, cured, rested, ground and finally placed into the desired vessel. Country-style forcemeats combine pork, pork fat (often with the addition of pork liver) and garnish ingredients, resulting in a coarse texture. The third style is gratin, which involves browning a portion of the main protein; the French term gratin implies a "grated" product that is browned. The final style is mousseline, which are very light in texture using lean cuts of meat usually from veal, poultry, fish, or shellfish. The resulting texture comes from the addition of eggs and cream to this forcemeat.

=== Sausage ===
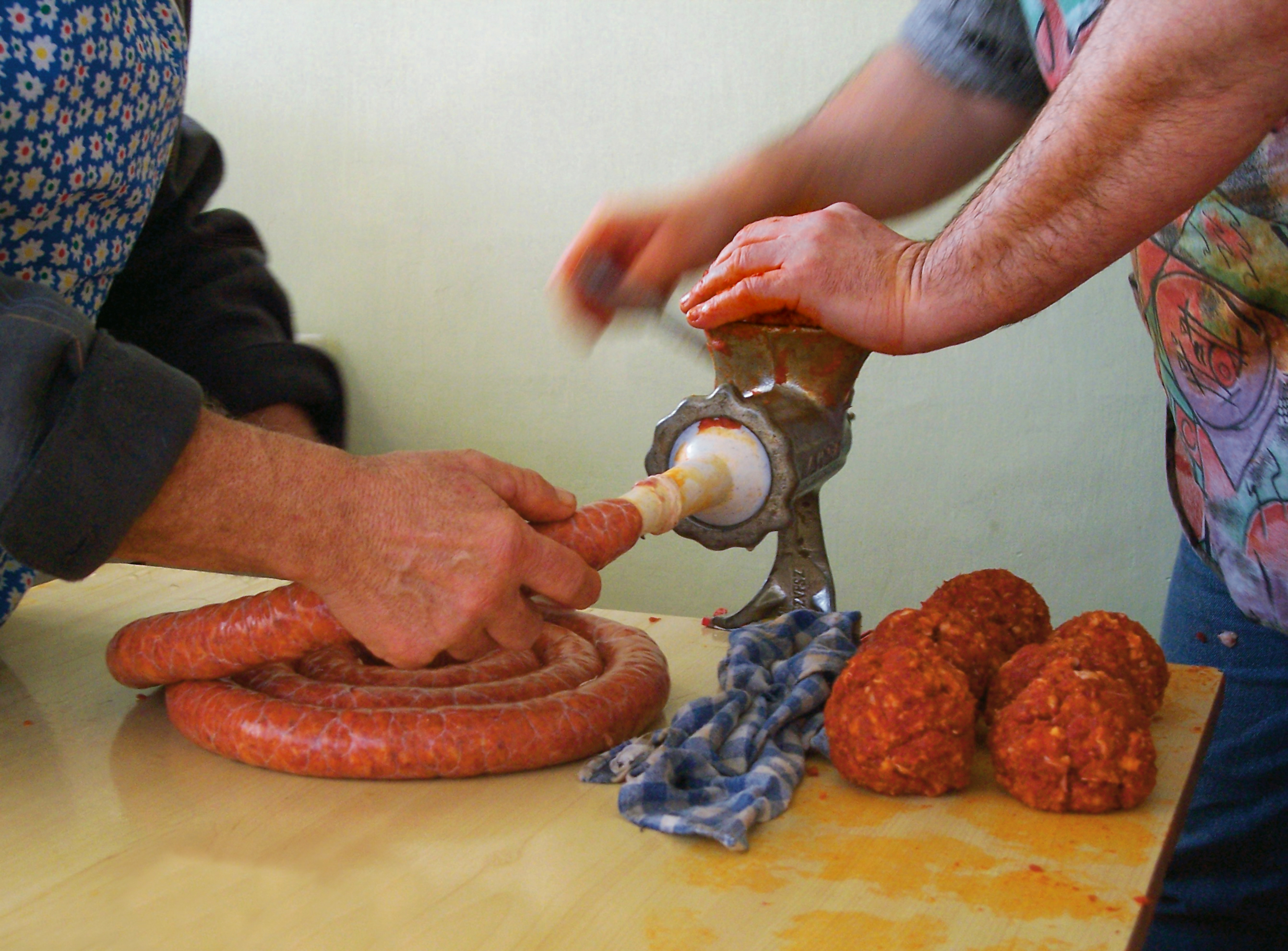
Sausage making

The word sausage is derived through French from the Latin sal, 'salt', as the sausage-making technique involves placing ground or chopped meat along with salt into a tube casing. The tube casings can vary, but the more common animal-derived casings include sheep, hog, or cattle intestinal linings. Additionally, animal stomachs and bladders, as well as edible artificial casings produced from collagen and inedible plant cellulose or paper, are used. Inedible casings are primarily used to shape, store, and age the sausage. The two main variants of sausage are fresh and cooked. Fresh sausages involve the production of raw meat placed into casings to be cooked at a later time, whereas cooked sausages are heated during production and are ready to eat at the end of production.

==== Emulsified sausage ====
Emulsified sausages are cooked sausages with a very fine texture, using the combination of pork, beef, or poultry with fat, salt, cure, flavorings, and water. These ingredients are emulsified at high speed in a food processor or blender. During this process, the salt dissolves the muscle proteins, which helps to suspend the fat molecules. Temperature is an important part of the process: if the temperature rises above 60 °F (16 °C) for pork or 70 °F (21 °C) for beef, the emulsion will not hold and fat will leak from the sausage during the cooking process.

=== Pâté, terrine, galantine, roulade ===
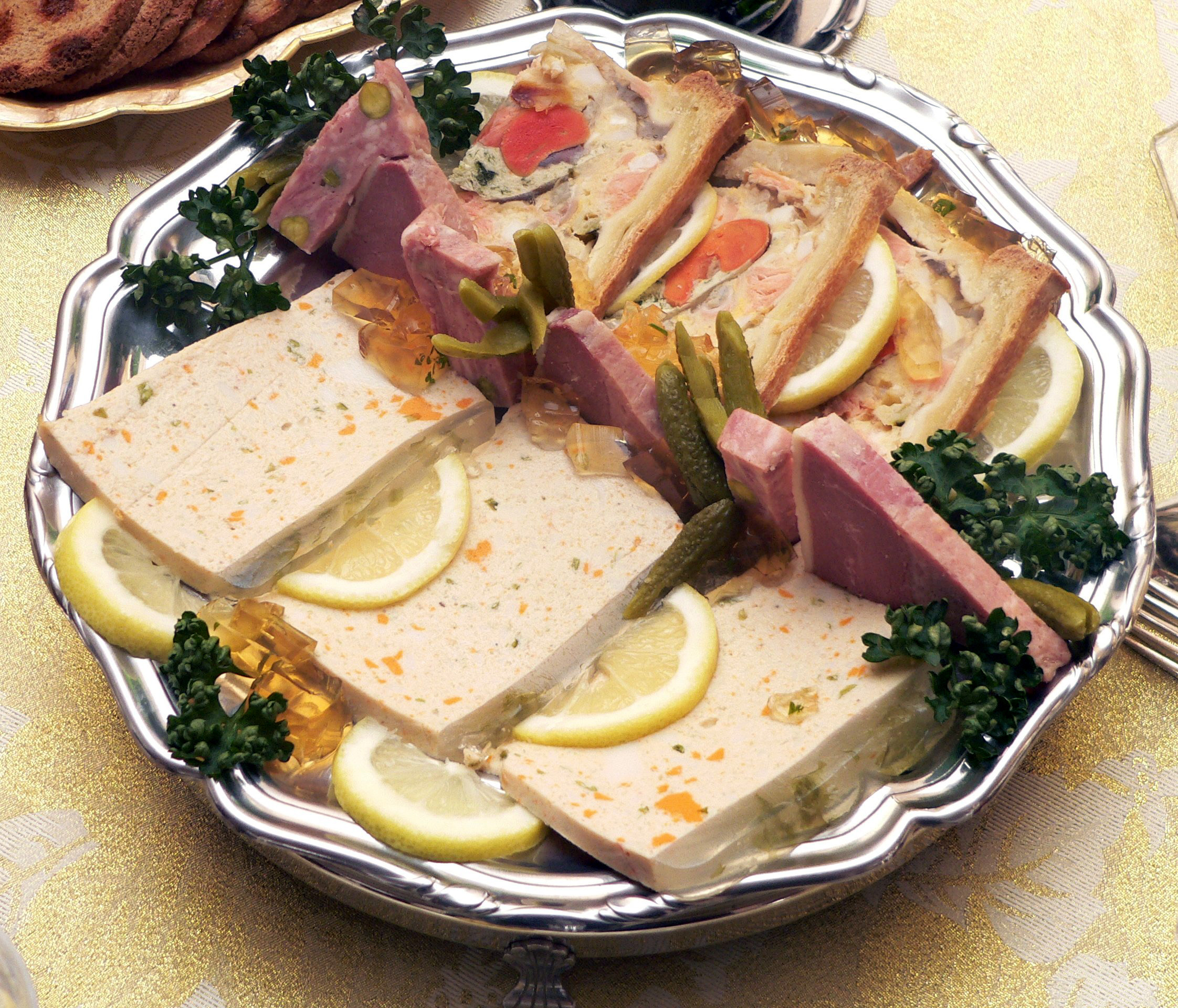
Various pâtés and terrines

Pâté and terrines are often cooked in a pastry crust or an earthenware container. Both the earthenware container and the dish itself are called a terrine. Pâté and terrine are very similar; the term pâté often suggests a finer-textured forcemeat using liver, whereas terrines are more often made of a coarser forcemeat. The meat is chopped or ground, along with heavy seasoning, which may include fat and aromatics. The seasoning is important, as they will generally be served cold, which mutes the flavors.

The mixture is placed into a lined mold, covered, and cooked in a water bath to control the temperature, which will keep the forcemeat from separating, as the water bath slows the heating process of the terrine. Pâté and terrine are generally cooked to 160 °F (71 °C), while terrine made of foie gras are generally cooked to an internal temperature of 120 °F (59 °C). After the proper temperature is reached, the terrine is removed from the oven and placed into a cooling unit topped with a weight to compact the contents of the terrine. It is then allowed to rest for several days to allow the flavors to blend.

The galantine is prepared by skinning and boning a chicken or other poultry. The skin is laid flat, with the pounded breast laid on top. A forcemeat is then placed on top of the pounded breast. The galantine is then rolled with the ends of the breast meeting one another. The galantine is then wrapped in cheesecloth and poached in poultry stock until the proper internal temperature is reached.

Roulade is similar to a galantine. The two major differences are instead of rolling the poultry evenly for the ends of the breasts to meet, the bird is rolled into a pinwheel shape, and the roulade is cooled by chilling it after it has been removed from the poaching liquid.

== Salt-cured and brined products ==
Salt serves four main purposes in the preservation of food in the charcuterie kitchen. The first is inducing osmosis: this process involves the movement of water outside of the membranes of the cells, which in turn reabsorb the salted water back into the cell. This process assists in the destruction of harmful pathogens. The second is dehydration, which means the salt pulls excess water from the protein, which aids in the shelf life of the protein, as there is less moisture present for bacterial growth. Fermentation is the third, in which salt assists in halting the fermentation process which would otherwise completely break the meat down. Finally, salt assists in denaturing proteins, which in essence means the structure of the proteins is effectively shifted, similar to the effects of cooking.

Before the discovery of nitrates and nitrites by German chemists around 1900, curing was done with unrefined salt and saltpeter. As saltpeter gives inconsistent results in preventing bacterial growth, nitrate and nitrite (in the forms of sodium nitrite and sodium nitrate) have increased in popularity for their consistent results. Nitrates take a considerably longer period of time to break down in cured foods than nitrites. Because of this, nitrates are the preferred curing salts for lengthy curing and drying periods. Nitrites are often used in foods that require a shorter curing time and are used for any item that will be fully cooked. Eventually, a portion of the nitrates will be converted into nitrites by bacterial action.

Nitrite has multiple purposes in the curing process. One purpose is flavor, the nitrites giving a sharp, piquant flavor to the meat. Second, the nitrites react with substances in the meat to produce nitric oxide. Nitric oxide prevents iron from breaking down the fat in the meat, thus halting rancidity. The binding also creates the characteristic reddish color found in most cured meat. Finally, the nitrite inhibits the growth of botulism-causing organisms that would ordinarily thrive in the oxygen-deprived environment in the sausage casing. German scientists originally named botulism poisoning Wurstvergiftung ('sausage poisoning'). The term botulism derives its name from the Latin term for "sausage".

Eating cured and processed meat products has been linked to a small increase in gastric cancer, as well as chronic obstructive pulmonary disease and colorectal cancer. The negative effects are presumed to be caused by nitrates and nitrites, as well as nitrosamines which are formed by nitrites reacting with meat. These risks are generally regarded as minimal, and regulations in the United States limit ingoing nitrites to 156 parts per million (0.0156%) (less for bacon) as a precautionary measure.

=== Curing salt blends ===
Two main types of curing salt mixture are used by the charcutier. The first is known by multiple names, including "tinted cure mix", "pink cure", "prague powder", or "insta-cure #1". The mixture is 93.75% sodium chloride and 6.25% sodium nitrite. When used, the recommended amount is a ratio of 4 oz for each 100 lb (1 kg for each 400 kg) of meat or 0.25% of the total weight of the meat. This blend is colored bright pink to keep the charcutier from confusing the mixture with regular salt.

The second curing salt blend is called "prague powder II" or "insta-cure #2". Also colored pink to differentiate it from table salt, it contains 6.25% sodium nitrite, 4% sodium nitrate, and 89.75% table salt. This mixture is used for dry sausages that require a longer drying period which requires the presence of nitrate.

=== Seasoning and flavoring agents ===
Sweeteners and other flavoring agents are necessary in the production of many cured products due to the harsh flavors of the salt. A number of sweeteners can be used in curing foods, including dextrose, sugar, corn syrup, honey, and maple syrup. Dextrose is seen often in cured meat, as it not only mellows the harshness, but it also increases the moisture content of the cured product while adding less sweetness to the cured meat. The sweeteners also assist in stabilizing the colors in meat and help the fermentation process by giving a nutrient to the bacteria.

Numerous spices and herbs are used in the curing process to assist with the flavor of the final product. The sweet spices regularly used include cinnamon, allspice, nutmeg, mace, and cardamom. Other flavoring agents may include dried and fresh chilies, wine, fruit juice, or vinegar.

=== Fermented sausage ===
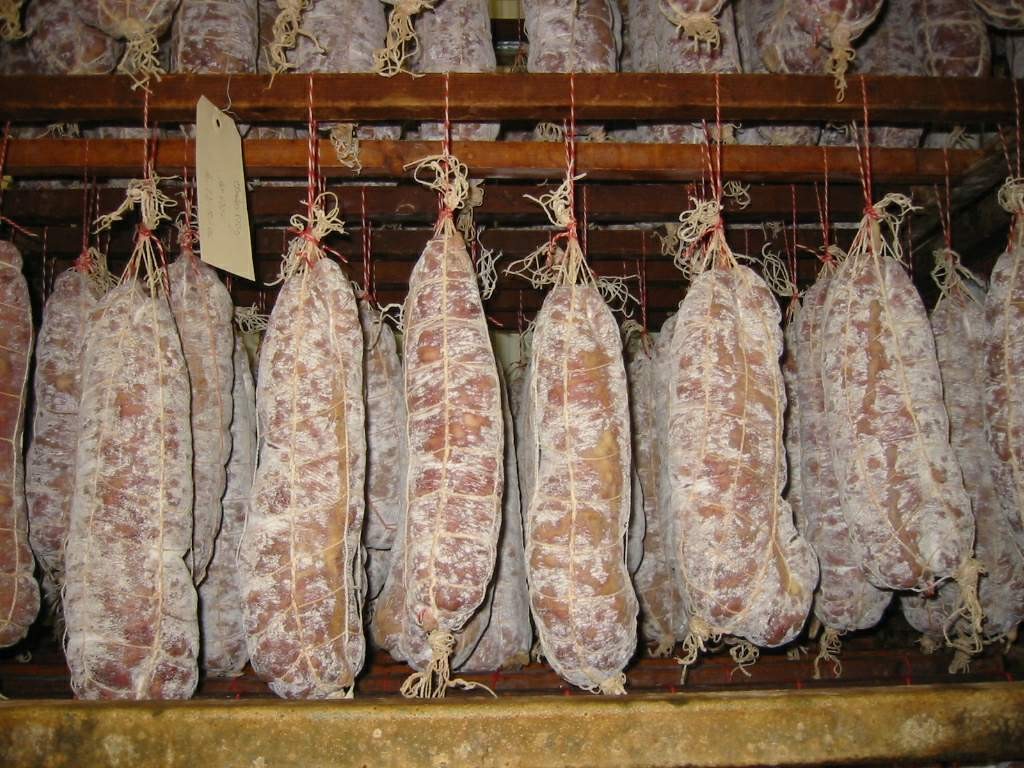
Saucisson

Fermented sausages are created by salting chopped or ground meat to remove moisture, while allowing beneficial bacteria to break down sugars into flavorful molecules. Bacteria, including Lactobacillus species and Leuconostoc species, break down these sugars to produce lactic acid, which not only affects the flavor of the sausage, but also lowers the pH from 6.0 to 4.5–5.0, preventing the growth of bacteria that could spoil the sausage. These effects are magnified during the drying process, as the salt and acidity are concentrated as moisture is extracted.

== See also ==
- Charcuterie board
- Lunch meat, also known as cold cuts – Precooked or cured meats that are sliced and served cold or hot
- List of dried foods
- List of smoked foods
- Salumi – Italian cured meat products usually made from pork
- Smallgoods – Culinary traditions of Australia
- Food preservation
- Fermentation in food processing
- Pickling
- Brining
- Curing (food preservation)
- Smoking (cooking)
- Food drying
- Jambon sec des Ardennes
- Embutido
