= Sous-chef =

Second in command of a kitchen

Sous-chef de cuisine's
Occupation
- Names: Sous-chef
- Pronunciation: /suˌʃɛf/
- Occupation type: Profession
- Activity sectors: Cooking

Description
- Competencies: Food expert, kitchen planning, management skills
- Fields of employment: Cooking, food
- Related jobs: Foodservice

A sous chef is a chef who is second-in-command of a kitchen, ranking directly below the head chef in the Kitchen Brigade system developed by Auguste Escoffier. In large kitchens, sous-chefs are typically left in charge of managing members of the kitchen on behalf of the head chef, who may often be preoccupied with other tasks such as purchasing, staffing or developing dishes.

== Duties and functions ==
The sous-chef has many responsibilities, because the executive chef has a more overarching role. Sous-chefs must plan and direct how the food is presented on the plate, keep their kitchen staff in order, train new chefs, create the work schedule, and make sure all the food that goes to customers is of the best quality to maintain high standards.

Sous-chefs are in charge of making sure all kitchen equipment is in working order. They must thoroughly understand how to use and troubleshoot all appliances and cooking instruments in the event of a malfunctioning cooking device. Sous-chefs are in charge of disciplining any kitchen staff who may have acted against restaurant policy. Incentive programs are commonly used among sous-chefs to encourage their staff to abide by rules and regulations, and motivate them to work efficiently at all times. Under the oversight of the sous-chef, downtime should be used for prepping, cleaning and other kitchen duties. They are responsible for inventory, product and supply rotation, and menu tasting. Sous-chefs need to be responsive and have the ability to improvise when a problem arises while the restaurant is busy. They must also ensure safety precautions and sanitary provisions are taken to ensure a safe and clean working environment.

== Qualifications ==
Many sous-chefs get to their position via promotion, after training and experience in the culinary profession.

In Canada, one way to advance to the sous-chef position is by getting a specialized college diploma, acquiring the knowledge necessary to qualify to take the Red Seal for the Journeyman Cook exam. A year after completing the exam, it is possible to enroll in the Chef Program to take an exam with the Canadian Culinary Federation.

Then, after four to five years of working experience, one can apply to the Certified Chef de Cuisine program.

== Training and career path ==
It takes several years to become a sous-chef in a professional kitchen. Many culinary professionals start as line cooks or commis chefs, where they learn how to prepare food, manage a station, and run a kitchen. Advancements involve working as a chef de partie or station chef. In this role, leadership skills are gained, and responsibility for specific sections of a kitchen is assigned.

Training is not always necessary to become a sous-chef. However, many complete a program at a school or hospitality organization. The programs include learning about kitchen management, nutrition, cooking methods, and hygiene. Some programs include an apprenticeship in a busy kitchen. Certain laws require certifications in food safety and cleanliness.

Sous-chefs are often required to have good culinary and organizational skills, as well as getting along well with others. Sous-chefs often have to supervise the kitchen staff and make sure everything runs smoothly during service. They have to be able to talk to people, resolve problems, and get things done on time. It also helps if they have experience with managing supplies, working with suppliers, and developing menus.

== See also ==
- List of restaurant terminology
