= Terrine (food) =

Loaf of forcemeat or aspic cooked in a terrine pottery mold in a bain-marie

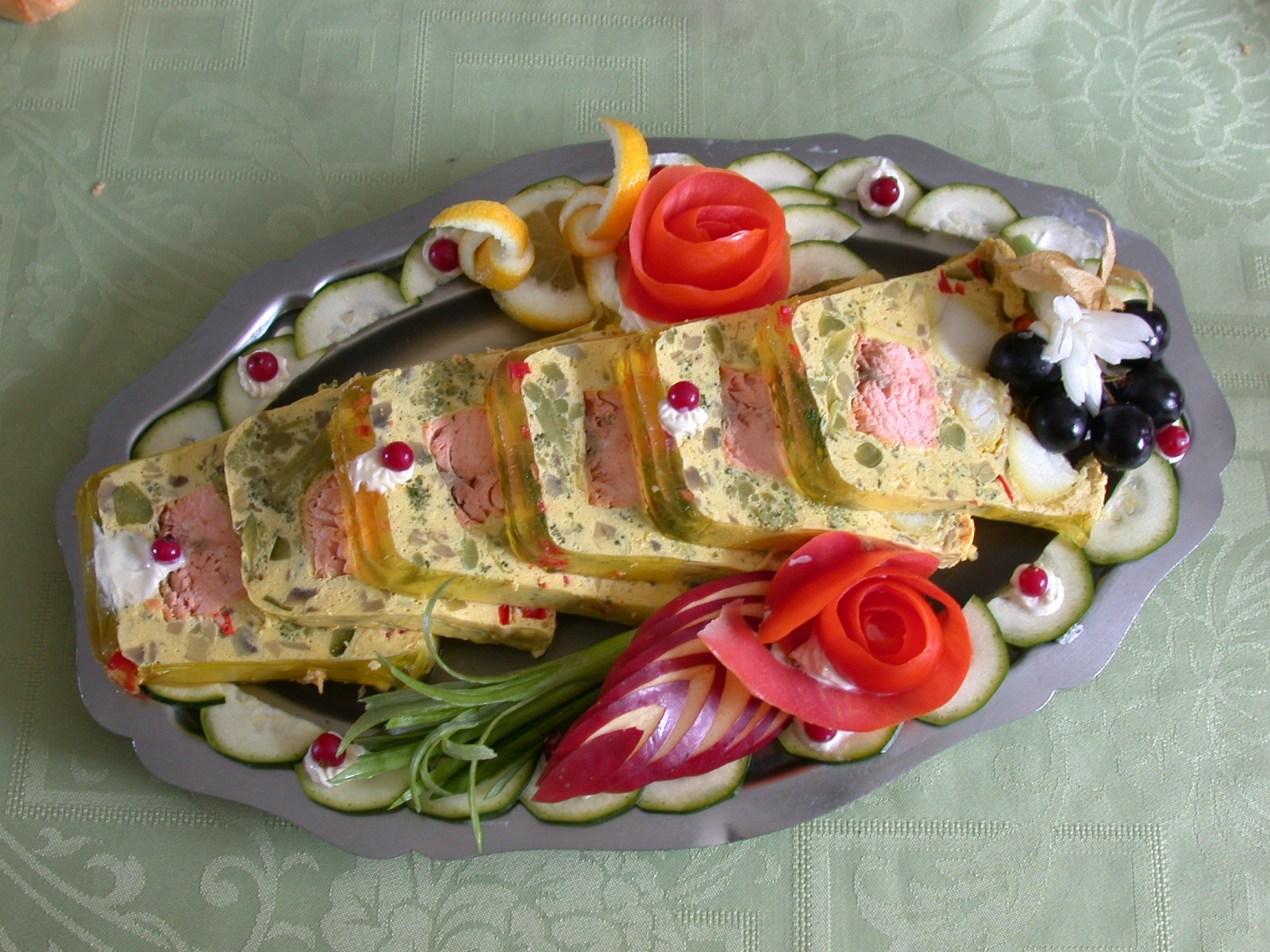
A basil salmon terrine

A terrine (French pronunciation: [tɛ.ʁin]), in traditional French cuisine, is a loaf of forcemeat or aspic, similar to a pâté, that is cooked in a covered pottery mold (also called a terrine) in a bain-marie. Modern terrines do not necessarily contain meat or animal fat, but still contain meat-like textures and fat substitutes, such as mushrooms and pureed fruits or vegetables high in pectin. They may also be cooked in a wide variety of non-pottery terrine moulds, such as stainless steel, aluminium, enameled cast iron, and ovenproof plastic.

Terrines are usually served cold or at room temperature. Most terrines contain a large amount of fat, although it is often not the main ingredient, and pork; many terrines are made with typical game meat, such as pheasant and hare. In the past, terrines were under the province of professional charcutiers, along with sausages, pâtés, galantines, and confit. Less commonly, a terrine may be another food cooked or served in the cooking dish called a 'terrine'.

== See also ==
- Galantine
- Meatloaf
- Spam (food)
