= Terrine (cookware) =

Glazed earthenware cooking dish with vertical sides and a tightly fitting lid

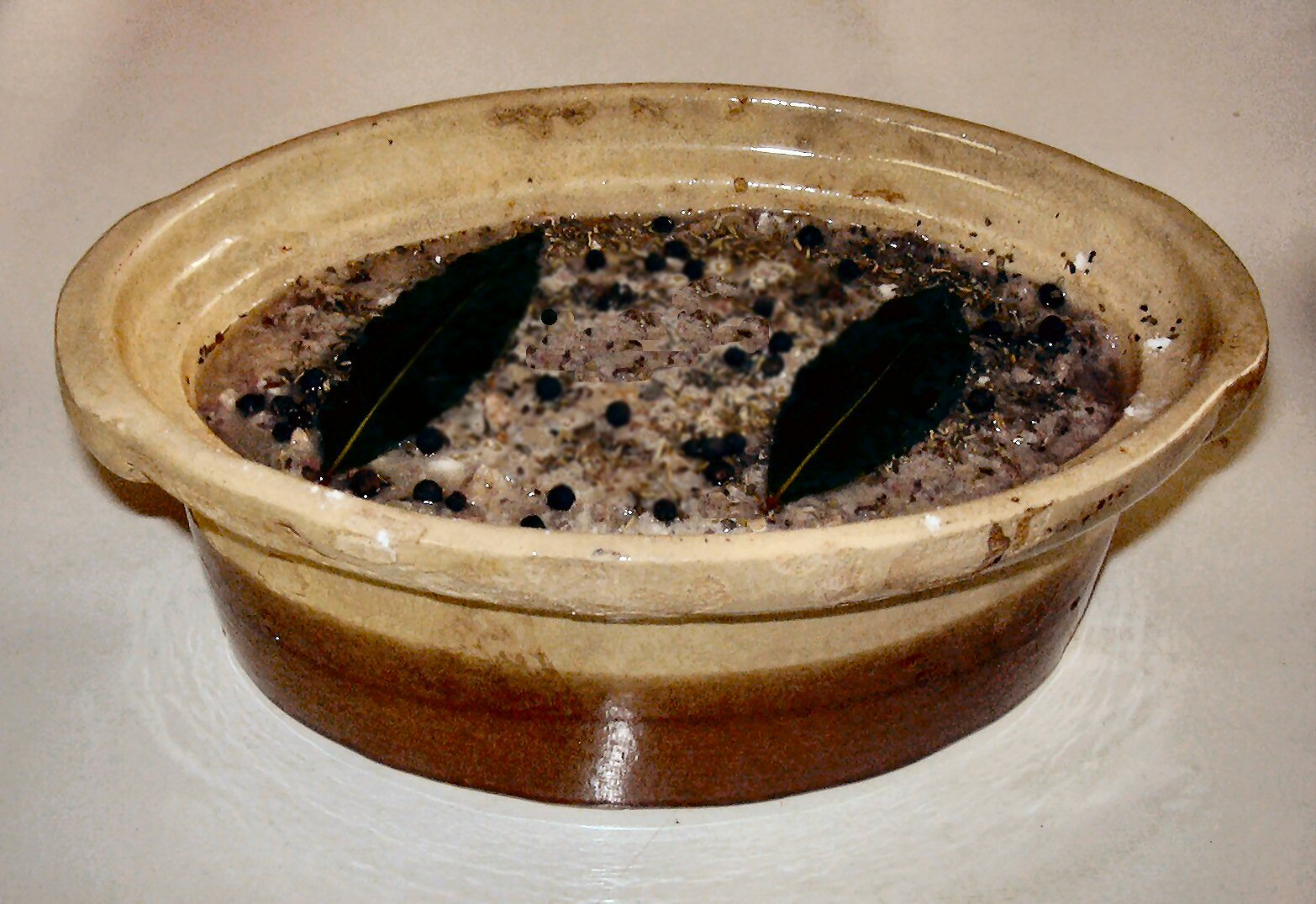
A terrine with peppercorns and bay leaves.

A terrine is a glazed earthenware (terracotta, French terre cuite) cooking dish with vertical sides and a tightly fitting lid, generally rectangular or oval. Modern versions are also made of enameled cast iron.

== See also ==
- List of cooking vessels
- Tureen for the serving dish
