= Pâté =

Forcemeat

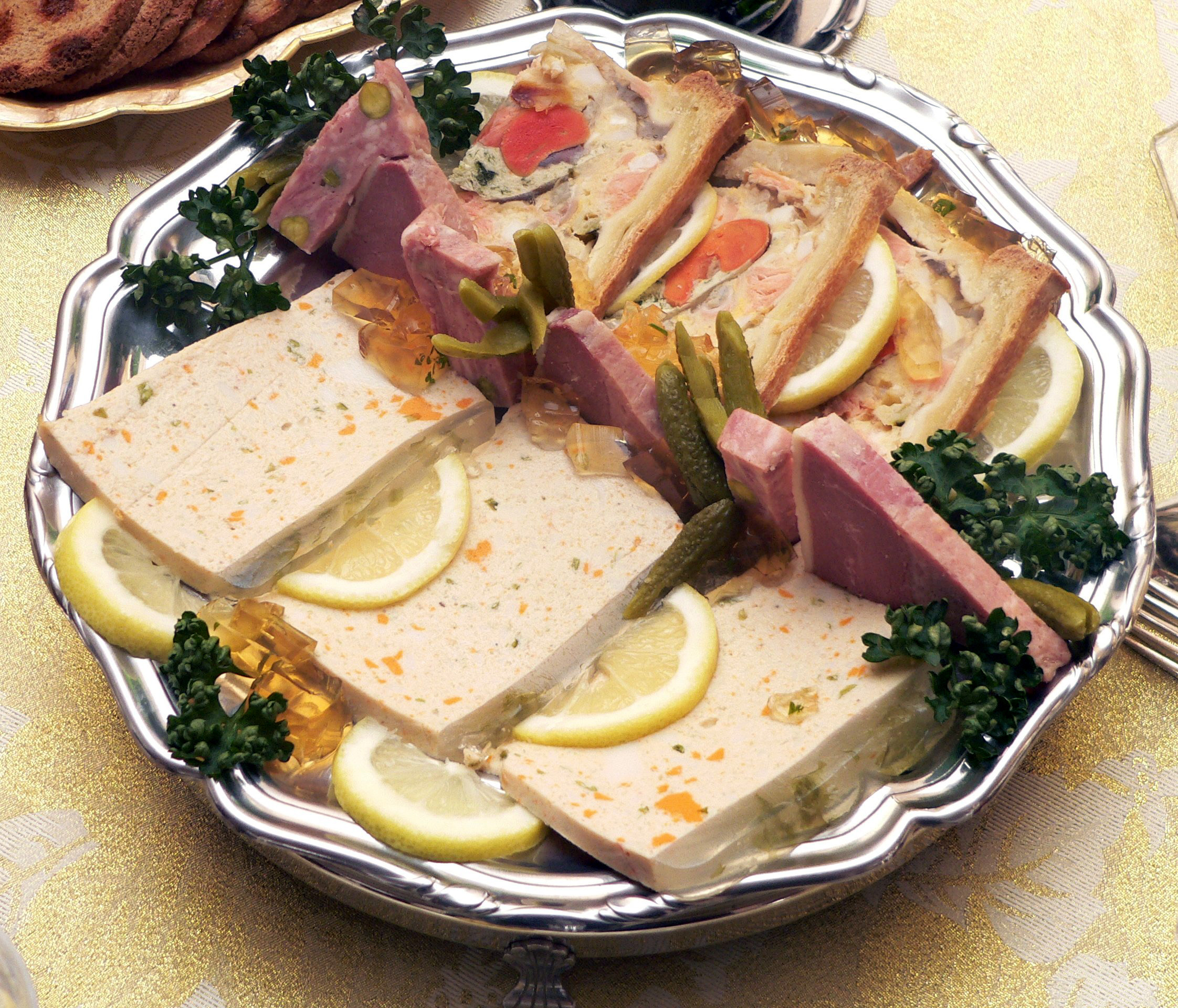
- Various pâtés
- Place of origin: France
- Main ingredients: Meat, fish, seafood, or vegetables

Pâté (UK: /ˈpæteɪ/ PAT-ay, US: /pæˈteɪ, pɑː-/ pa(h)-TAY, French: [pɑte]) is a forcemeat. Originally, the dish was cooked in a pastry case and called pâté en croute; in more recent times it is more usually cooked without pastry in a terrine, and called pâté en terrine or simply terrine. Various ingredients are used, which may include meat from pork, poultry, fish or beef; fat; vegetables; herbs; spices; wine; and brandy.

== History and etymology ==
Both the Dictionnaire de l'Académie française and the Oxford English Dictionary (OED) date the term back to the 12th century. The former gives the original meaning as a "culinary preparation consisting of minced meat or fish surrounded by dough and baked in the oven"; the OED's definition is "a pie or pastry usually filled with finely minced meat, fish, vegetables, etc." The French words pâte (pastry) and pâté are both derived from the Latin pasta meaning paste or dough (as is the English "pastry"). By the 19th century the pastry case was often dispensed with. According to Larousse Gastronomique, when there is a pastry case the dish is pâté en croute and when there is not, and the mixture is cooked in a dish (called a terrine), it is pâté en terrine, often abbreviated to terrine or pâté, terms used interchangeably in both French and English usage. A patty is a similar dish, and its name comes from a 19th-century English corruption of the French word pâté.

Pâté was known to the Romans, who generally made it with pork, although other main ingredients might include marinated and spiced birds' tongues. In the Middle Ages, there were numerous recipes for pâtisseries (meats—pork, poultry, game or fish— cooked in pastry).

Tinned pâté, being shelf-stable, has sometimes been included in military rations, for, among others, the French Armed Forces, whose rations have included tinned pâté for more than 100 years.

== Varieties ==
There are numerous varieties of French pâtés or terrines, including:

Type and main ingredients	French name	Ref.
calves' sweetbreads terrine	terrine de ris de veau	
game pâté	terrine de gibier	
duck or goose liver pâté (foie gras)	pâte de foie gras	
ham and cauliflower terrine	terrine de jambon et chou-fleur	
ham, pork and veal terrine	terrine de jambon, porc et veau	
hare terrine	terrine de lièvre	
mushroom pâté	pâté de cèpes	
partridge terrine	terrine de perdreau	
pheasant terrine	terrine de faisan	
pigeon terrine	terrine de pigeon	
pork and game terrine	terrine de porc et de gibier	
pork and liver pâté	terrine de campagne	
quail terrine	terrine de caille	
rabbit terrine	terrine de lapin	
truffled pâte of duck	pâté de canard Lucullus	
turbot and salmon terrine with lobster	terrine de l'océan	
vegetable terrine	terrine de légumes	
venison liver pâté	pâté de foie de chevreuil	

== Parfait ==
Chicken liver parfait is a subtype of pâté. Instead of first cooking the livers in butter, for a parfait they are initially puréed when raw and then passed through a sieve or put in a blender before being mixed with, typically, eggs, fortified wine, shallots, thyme, garlic and cognac and cooked in a bain-marie until set. This allows for a smoother texture.

== Other countries ==
In Central and Eastern Europe, pâté from poultry liver is very popular and it is commonly known as pashtet (Russian: паштет, "pâté", Polish: pasztet, Czech: paštika, Croatian: pašteta). Liver from other animals (such as cow) can also be used. The liver is first cooked (boiled or fried) and mixed with butter or fat and seasonings such as fresh or fried onions, carrots, spices, and herbs. It can be further cooked (usually baked), but most often used without any other preparation. In Russia, the pâté is served on a plate or in a bowl, and is typically moulded into the shapes of animals, such as hedgehogs.

In Ashkenazi Jewish cuisine, a similar recipe is known as chopped liver, with schmaltz used instead of butter and hard-boiled eggs frequently added. Another common type of pâté in Jewish cuisine, also popular in Russia and Ukraine, is vorschmack, or gehakte herring (chopped herring). In Vietnamese cuisine, pâté is commonly used on bánh mì baguette-type sandwiches.

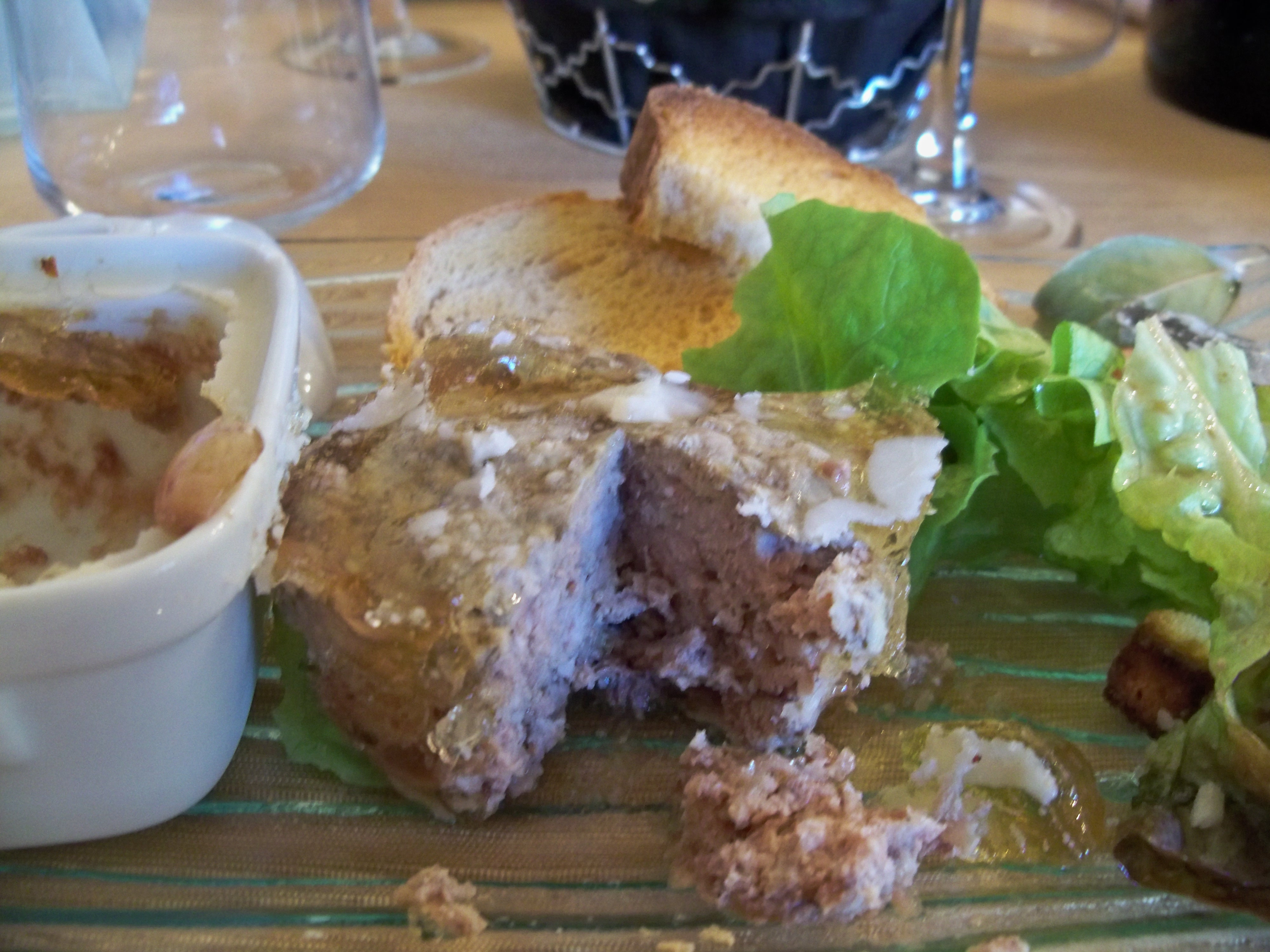
Wild boar terrine

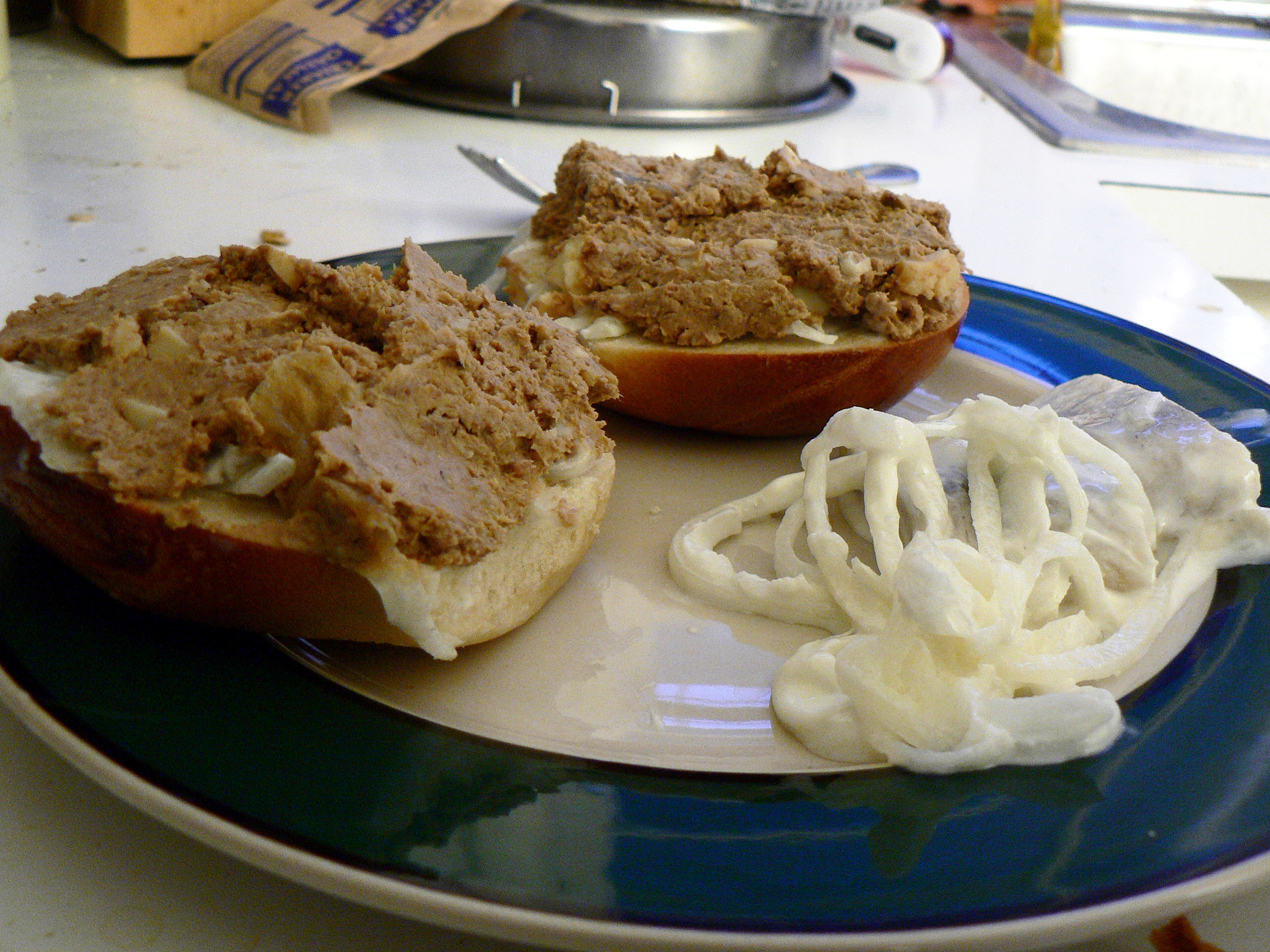
Chopped liver

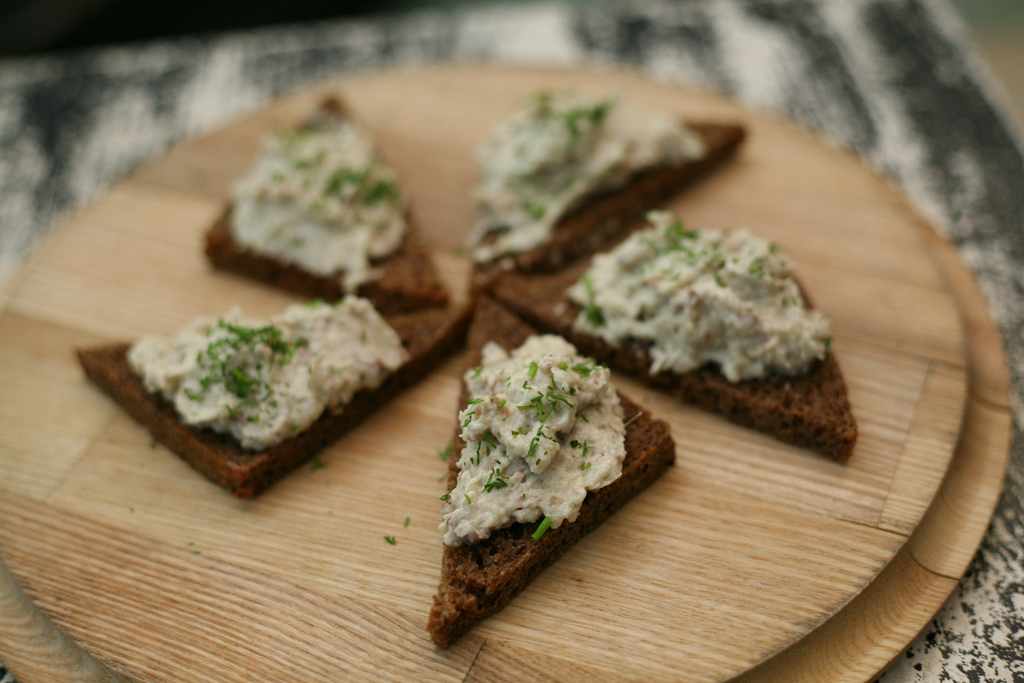
Vorschmack (chopped herring)

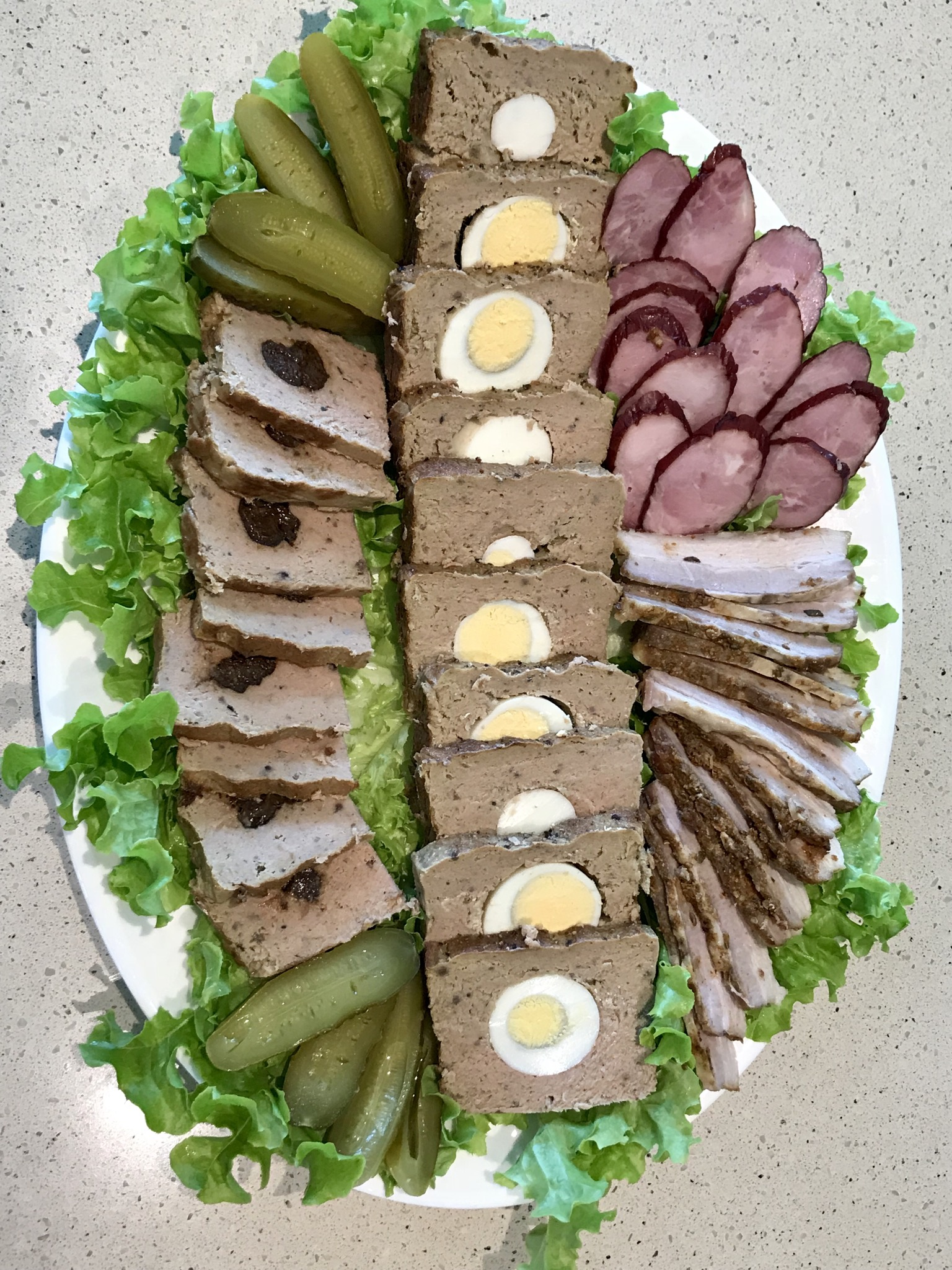
Polish pasztet

== See also ==
- Cretons
- Fatback
- Foie gras
- Galantine
- Gefilte fish
- Head cheese
- List of spreads
- Liver paté
- Liver spread
- Livermush
- Meatloaf
- Offal
- Rillettes

== Sources ==
- Beullac, Geneviève, ed. (2001). Larousse Gastronomique. London: Hamlyn. ISBN 978-0-60-060235-4.
- Brazier, Eugénie; Moreau, Roger; Bocuse, Paul; Pacaud, Bernard (2015) [2004]. La Mère Brazier: The Mother of Modern French Cooking. London: Modern Books. ISBN 978-1-906761-84-4.
- David, Elizabeth (1999) [1980]. Elizabeth David Classics. London: Grub Street. ISBN 978-1-902304-27-4.
- David, Elizabeth (2010) [1960]. French Provincial Cooking. London: Folio Society. OCLC 809349711.
- Goldstein, Darra (1999). A Taste of Russia: A Cookbook of Russian Hospitality. Russian Information Service. ISBN 978-1-88-010042-4.
- Roux, Michel Jr (2009). A Life in the Kitchen. London: Weidenfeld & Nicolson. ISBN 978-0-297-84482-2.
