= Galantine =

Stuffed meat dish from French cuisine

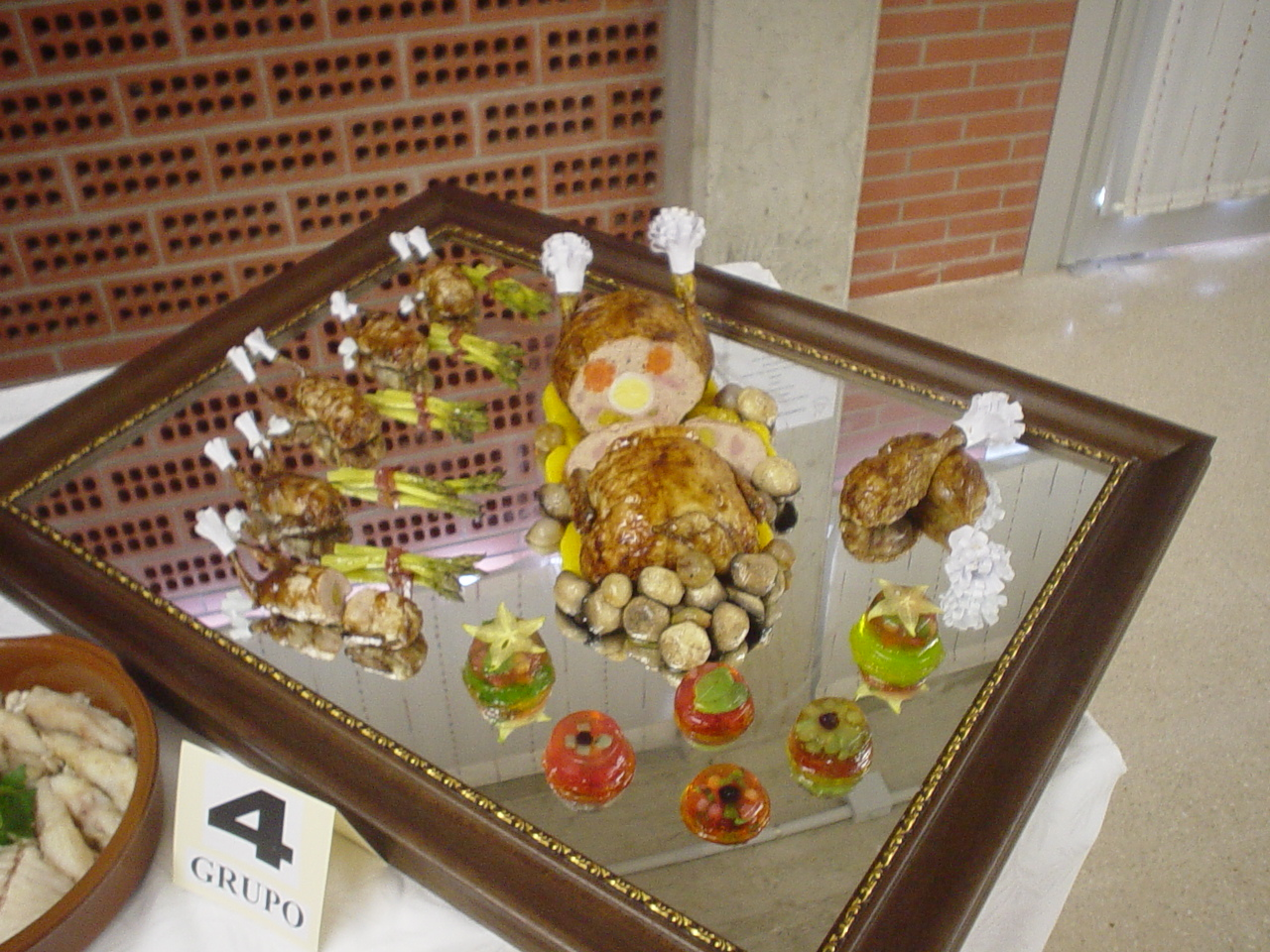
Duck galantine

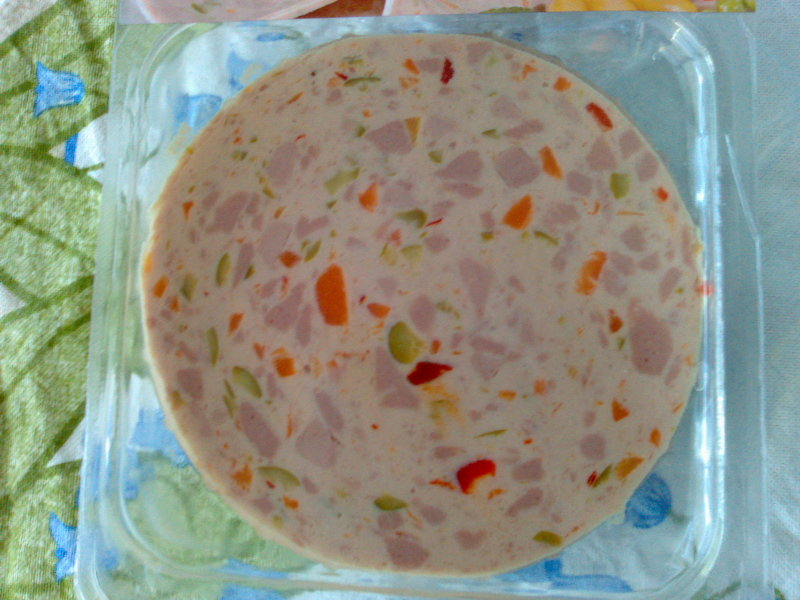
Galantine with vegetables

In French cuisine, galantine (French: [galɑ̃tin]) is a dish of boned, stuffed meat, most commonly poultry or fish, that is usually poached and served cold, often coated with aspic. Galantines are often stuffed with forcemeat, and pressed into a cylindrical shape. Since boning poultry can be difficult and time-consuming for the novice, this is a rather elaborate dish, which is often lavishly decorated, hence its name, connoting a presentation at table that is galant, or urbane and sophisticated. In the later nineteenth century the technique's origin was already attributed to the chef of the marquis de Brancas.

In the Middle Ages, the term galauntine or galantyne, perhaps with the same connotations of gallantry, referred instead to any of several sauces made from powdered galangal root, usually made from bread crumbs with other ingredients, such as powdered cinnamon, strained and seasoned with salt and pepper. The dish was sometimes boiled or simmered before or after straining, and sometimes left uncooked, depending on the recipe. Surviving recipes indicate that the sauce may have complemented fish, eels, geese, and venison. Galantine also appears in Geoffrey Chaucer's "To Rosamond", parodying extravagant declarations of courtly love:

Was nevere pik walwed in galauntine
As I in love am walwed and vwounde.

Translation:

A pike was never wallow’d in galantine
As I in love lie mired and wounded now.

== See also ==
- Cameline sauce
- Chicken galantina
- Ballotine
- Head cheese
- List of stuffed dishes
- Terrine
- Turducken
