= Shepherd's pie =

Pie of minced meat topped with mashed potato

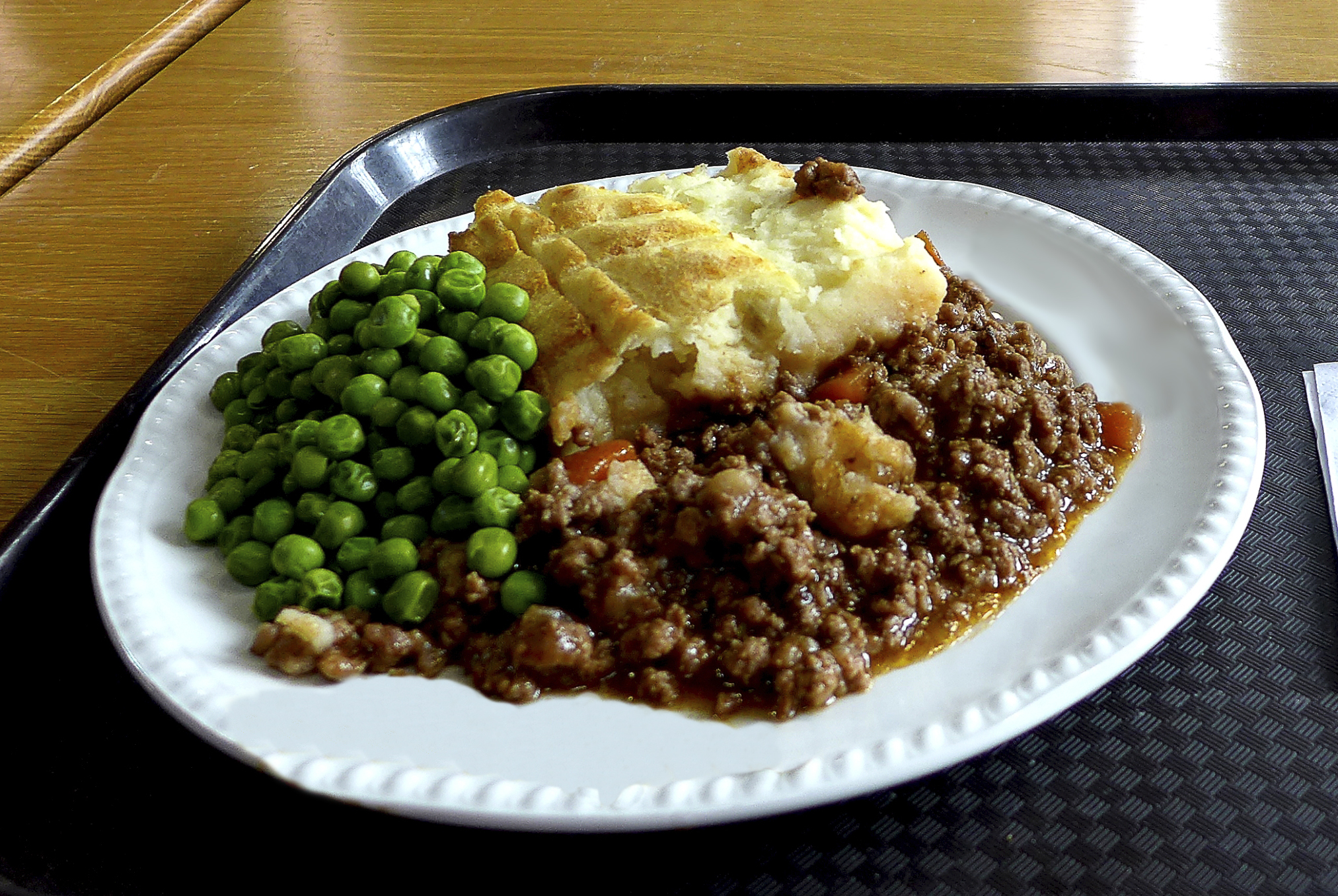
- Shepherd's pie served with peas, a common accompaniment
- Alternative names: Cottage pie, hachis Parmentier
- Type: Meat pie
- Place of origin: Britain and France
- Main ingredients: Mashed potato with minced meat
- Variations: Cumberland pie, Shepherdess pie

Shepherd's pie, cottage pie, or in French cuisine hachis Parmentier, is a savoury dish of cooked minced meat topped with mashed potato and baked, formerly also called Sanders or Saunders. The meat used may be either previously cooked or freshly minced. The terms shepherd's pie and cottage pie have been used interchangeably since they came into use in the late 18th and early 19th centuries, although some writers insist that a shepherd's pie should contain lamb or mutton, and a cottage pie, beef.

The term "cottage pie" is first recorded in 1791. "Shepherd's pie" is later, first recorded in the nineteenth century. Some modern variations are vegetarian or vegan, using substitutes for meat and dairy ingredients.

== Definitions and preparation ==
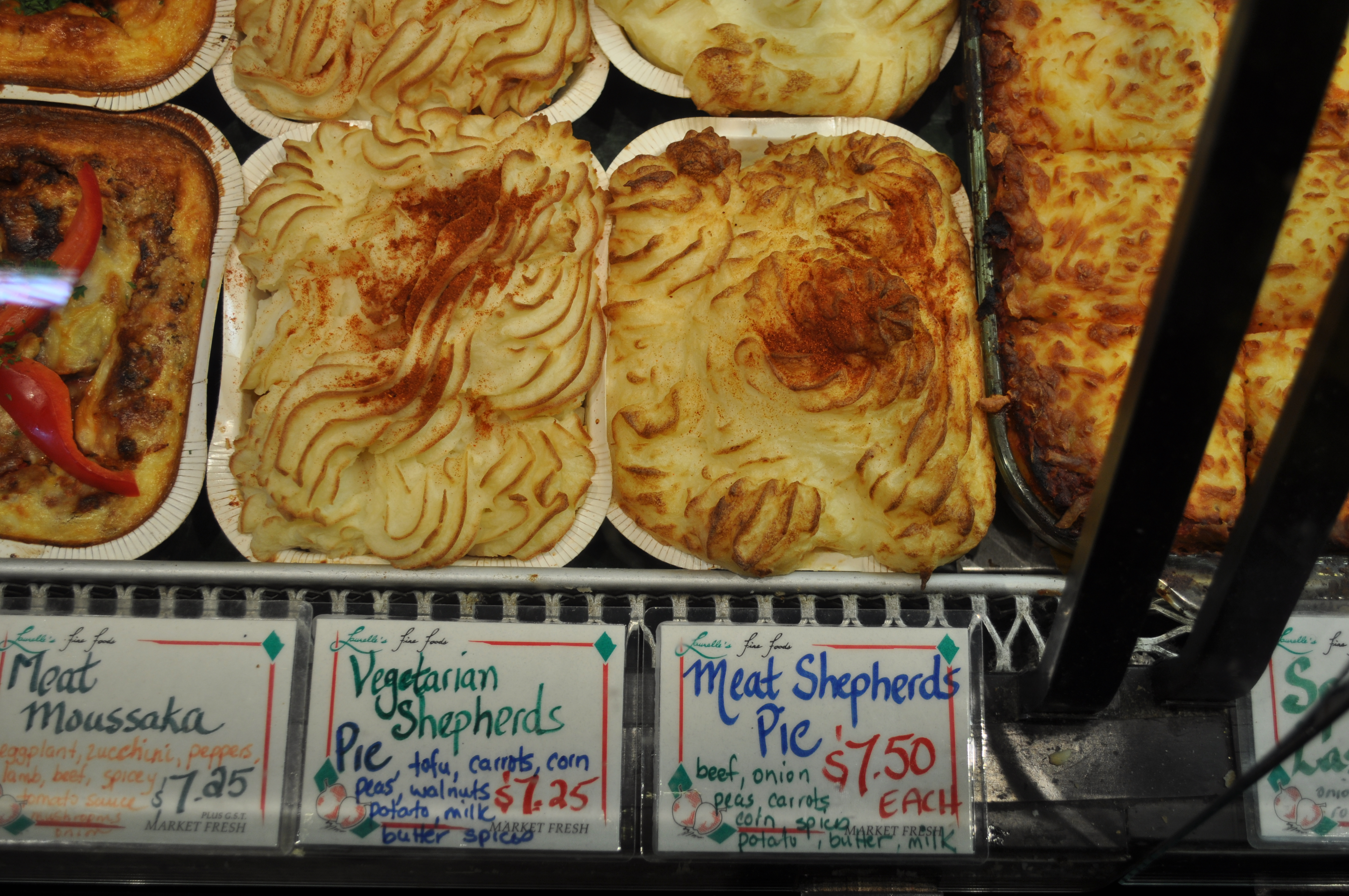
Vegetarian and beef shepherd's pies for sale

Some people in Britain call the pies made with beef "cottage pies" and those with lamb, "shepherd's pies". The major supermarkets do so, and the distinction is backed by some reference works. (Note: Oxford Companion to Food: "In keeping with the name [of shepherd's pie] the meat should be mutton or lamb; and it is usually cooked meat left over from a roast".) (Note: Oxford English Dictionary: "cottage pie: A dish of minced beef or (occasionally) other meat which has been topped with mashed potato and then baked or browned"; "shepherd's pie: a pie consisting of chopped meat and potatoes, covered with a crust of mashed potatoes browned".) Other authorities (Note: Brewer's Dictionary: "Cottage pie: Another name for shepherd's pie, made with minced meat topped with mashed potato. A distinction used to be drawn between the beef content of cottage pie and the lamb or mutton content of shepherd's pie, but there is no evidence that that was originally the case, and it is largely ignored nowadays". Shepherd's pie, "A pie made with minced meat topped with mashed potato. The term was at one time applied strictly to such a pie made with lamb or mutton, but it is now used synonymously with cottage pie".) and cooks and food writers including Prue Leith, Caroline Waldegrave and John Ayto regard the two names as completely interchangeable. (Note: Leith and Waldegrave: "The confusion over Cottage Pie and Shepherd's Pie is complete. Cottage pie used to denote the use of leftover cooked meat, either beef or mutton. "Shepherd's", naturally enough, meant that mutton was the meat used, usually pre-cooked. But today either name seems to mean either beef or lamb, made with leftover or fresh meat, the only certainty being the mashed potato top". Ayto: "In present-day English, cottage pie is an increasingly popular synonym for shepherd's pie, a dish of minced meat with a topping of mashed potato".) Jane Grigson's 1974 recipe for shepherd's pie uses beef, and mentions that it is "sometimes called" cottage pie.

In Australia, (Note: Australian Oxford Dictionary: "cottage pie = shepherd's pie"; "shepherd's pie: a dish of minced meat under a layer of mashed potato".) Canada, (Note: Oxford Canadian Dictionary: "shepherd's pie: a dish of ground meat under a layer of mashed potato"; there is no entry for "cottage pie".) and the US, (Note: Merriam-Webster Dictionary (US): "shepherd's pie: a meat pie with a mashed potato crust". The dictionary has no entry for cottage pie.) "shepherd's pie" is a common term for a dish of any meat covered in mashed potato. Food retailers in those countries apply the term "shepherd's pie" to beef-filled pies as well as those containing lamb. (Note: The Australian chain Coles Supermarkets offers a shepherd's pie made with minced beef. The photograph of the "shepherd's pies" immediately below the infobox of this article was taken in Vancouver and the meat is stated to be beef. Walmart (US) offers three different "shepherd's pies" made with beef; Costco (US) likewise sells shepherd's pies made with beef.)

A basic shepherd's pie consists of cooked minced meat covered with mashed potatoes. It is baked.

== History ==
=== Cottage pie ===
The term was in use by 1791. Parson Woodforde mentions "Cottage-Pye" in his diary entry for 29 August 1791 and several times thereafter. He records that the meat was veal but does not say what the topping was. The dish was known under a different name in the early 19th century: in 1806, in her book A New System of Domestic Cookery, Maria Rundell published a recipe for "Sanders", consisting of minced beef or mutton, with onion and gravy, topped with mashed potato and baked as individual servings. (Note: In 1845 Eliza Acton published her recipe for "Saunders", similar to Rundell's, but with a layer of mashed potato underneath the minced meat as well as one on top. Like Rundell, she uses pre-cooked meat but adds, "A very superior kind of saunders is made by substituting fresh meat for roasted; but this requires to be baked an hour or something more".) Sanders or Saunders could also have a filling of sliced meat. (Note: The name "Saunders" is still used in at least one cookery book for a similar dish made with corned beef.) According to Jane Grigson in English Food, mincing originally meant chopping something with a knife. "But with the first mincing-machines, prison, school and seaside boarding house cooks acquired a new weapon to depress their victims, with watery mince, shepherd's pie with rubbery granules of left-over meat."

In 20th-century and later British usage the term cottage pie has widely, but not exclusively, been used for a dish of chopped or minced beef with a mashed potato topping. Grigson records that that to make the dish go further, some recipes put in a bottom layer of potato before adding the meat and top layer. The meat may be raw or previously cooked; the latter was at one time more usual. Well into the 20th century the absence of refrigeration made it expedient in many domestic kitchens to store cooked meat rather than raw. In the 1940s the French-American chef Louis Diat recalled of his childhood days, "when housewives bought their Sunday meat they selected pieces large enough to make into leftover dishes for several days". Modern recipes for cottage pie typically use fresh beef.

=== Shepherd's pie ===
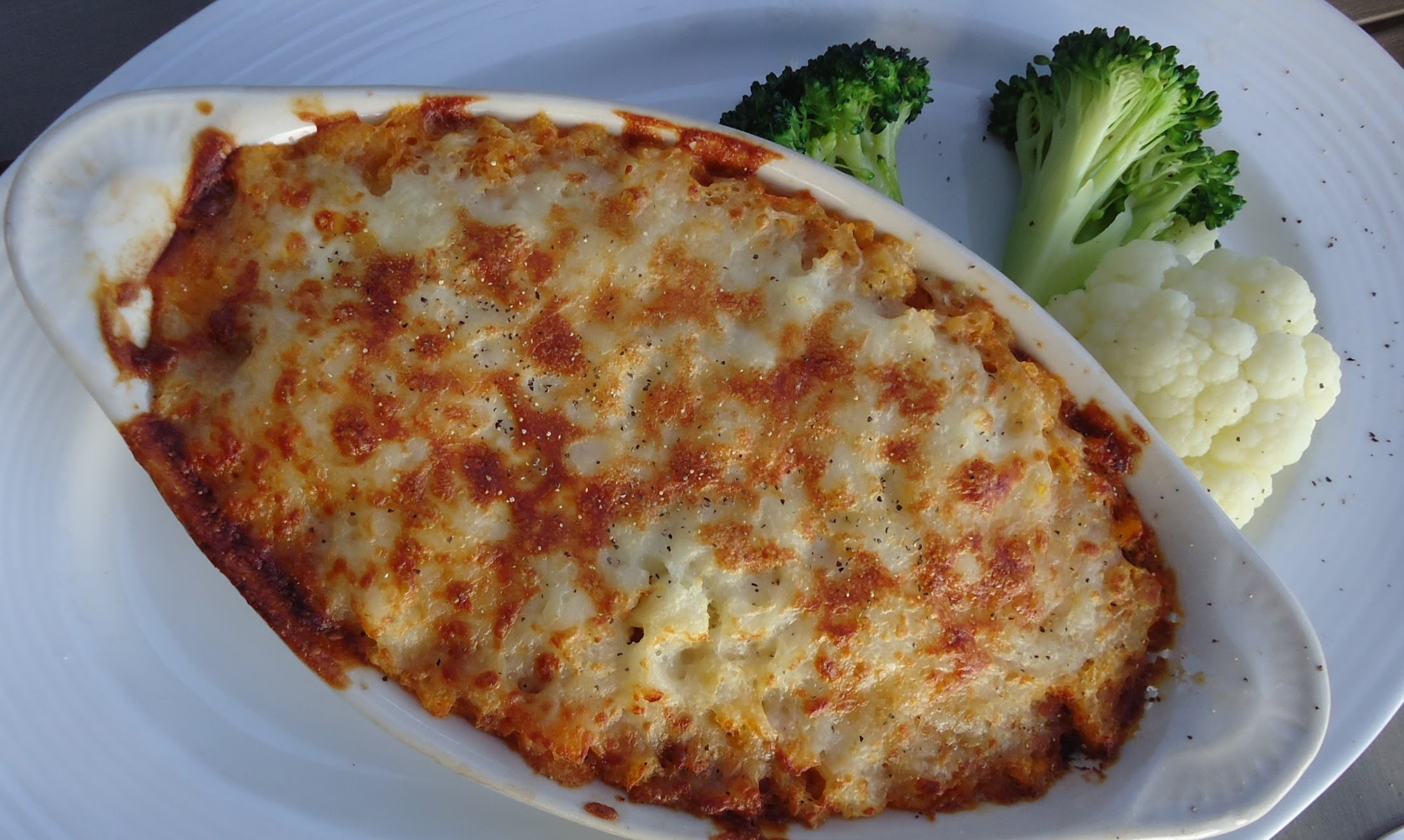
Shepherd's pie in an English restaurant

A recipe for shepherd's pie published in Edinburgh in 1849 in The Practice of Cookery and Pastry specifies cooked meat of any kind, sliced rather than minced, covered with mashed potato and baked. In the 1850s the term was also used for a Scottish dish that contained a mutton and diced potato filling inside a pastry crust. Neither shepherd's pie nor cottage pie was mentioned in the original edition of Mrs Beeton's Household Management in 1861, but a similar dish called Baked Minced Mutton called for onions, herbs and mutton, minced and baked in layers, covered with mashed potato on top and baked. In 1898 a recipe for a vegetarian shepherd's pie was published in The Vegetarian Messenger by Florence Nicholson.

More recently "shepherd's pie" has generally been used for a potato-topped dish of minced lamb. As with beef, it was commonplace in the days before refrigeration to cook a Sunday joint to last in various guises throughout the week. Dorothy Hartley quotes a traditional verse, "Vicarage mutton", showing not only the uses to which the joint was put, but also the interchangeability of the terms "shepherd's" and "cottage" pie – that the latter can be made with mutton rather than beef:

Hot on Sunday,
Cold on Monday,
Hashed on Tuesday,
Minced on Wednesday,
Curried Thursday,
Broth on Friday,
Cottage pie Saturday.

=== Hachis Parmentier ===
The dish hachis Parmentier is named after Antoine-Augustin Parmentier, who popularised the potato in French cuisine in the late 18th century. It is documented from the late 19th century. (Note: It is listed on a bistro menu in Le Petit Moniteur universel, 29 June 1892: "Escargots. Fraise de veau. Ravigotte. Navarin pommes. Salé aux choux. Hachis Parmentier. Œufs, saucisses. Poulet rôti chaud".) It is usually made with chopped or minced lamb or beef; in either case it may be made with either fresh or left-over cooked meat. (The English term "hash" comes from the French hachis, meaning food finely chopped.) (Note: In his Grand dictionnaire de cuisine (1873) Alexandre Dumas wrote, "When you have veal, beef, chicken, game or scraps of meat left over from dinner the night before, all you have to do is chop these left-overs neatly, and there are tools for that, until the whole forms a complete mixture.")

In some recipes a layer of sauté potatoes is put in the cooking dish before the meat filling and mashed potato topping are added. A more elaborate version by Auguste Escoffier, named hachis de boeuf à Parmentier, consists of baked potatoes, the contents of which are removed, mixed with freshly-cooked diced beef, returned to the potato shells and covered with sauce lyonnaise.

== Variations ==
There are no universally agreed ingredients for any of the variants. The recipes cited in the table show the varieties of titles and ingredients recommended by cooks and food writers from Australia, Britain, Canada, France, South Africa and the US.

Cook/writer	From	Name of dish	Meat used	Fresh or left-over	Ref.
Mary Berry	Britain	Cottage pie	Beef	Fresh	
Mary Berry	Britain	Shepherd's pie	Lamb	Left-over / fresh	
Mère Biasin	France	Hachis Parmentier	Lamb	Left-over boiled (Note: In Mère Biasin's version, rather than a single layer of ragout and a single layer of potato, there would be several alternating layers of each, with a potato one on the top.)	
Hairy Bikers	Britain	Cottage pie	Beef	Fresh	
Paul Bocuse	France	Hachis Parmentier	Beef, pork, veal, chicken, preferably mixed	Left-over	
Robert Carrier	US/Britain	Cottage pie	Beef	Fresh	
Felicity Cloake	Britain	Cottage pie	Beef	Fresh, chopped, not minced	
Jean-Pierre Coffe	France	Hachis Parmentier	Beef	Left-over boiled, mixed with fresh calves' liver	
Elizabeth Craig	Britain	Shepherd's pie	Lamb	Left-over casseroled	
Rocco DiSpirito	US	Shepherd's pie	Beef	Fresh	
Fannie Farmer	US	Cottage pie	Pork	Left-over	
Jane Grigson	Britain	Shepherd's pie	Beef or lamb (Note: In the 1974 edition of English Food, Grigson states the dish should be made with beef; in the 1992 edition she lists beef or lamb.)	Fresh	
Michel Guérard	France	Hachis Parmentier	Veal sweetbreads and duck gizzards	Fresh	
Mark Hix	Britain	Shepherd's pie	Beef and lamb	Fresh	
Graham Kerr	Britain	Cottage pie	Beef	Fresh	
Tom Kerridge	Britain	Cottage pie	Beef	Fresh	
Prue Leith	S. Africa/Britain	Shepherd’s pie or cottage pie	Beef	Fresh	
Jean Paré	Canada	Hachis Parmentier	Beef	Fresh	
Marguerite Patten	Britain	Cottage pie	Lamb	Left-over	
Henri-Paul Pellaprat	France	Hachis Parmentier	Beef	Left-over	
Anne-Sophie Pic	France	Oxtail Parmentier	Beef	Fresh	
Gordon Ramsay	Britain	Shepherd's pie	Lamb	Fresh	
Jay Rayner	Britain	Cottage pie	Beef and pork	Fresh	
Gary Rhodes	Britain	Shepherd's pie	Lamb	Fresh	
Michel Roux, Jr. (Note: "For me, the best shepherd's pie is made with leftover roast lamb, either shoulder or leg. In fact, I remember my sister and myself holding back on a Sunday lunch in case there wasn't enough left to make the pie.")	France/Britain	Hachis Parmentier	Lamb	Left-over roast	
Madame Saint-Ange	France	Hachis de bœuf au gratin	Beef	Left-over	
Keith Sarasin	US	Cottage pie	Lamb	Fresh	
Nigel Slater	Britain	Shepherd's Pie	Lamb	Fresh	
Delia Smith	Britain	Cottage pie	Beef	Fresh	
Delia Smith	Britain	Shepherd's pie	Lamb	Fresh	
Rick Stein	Britain	Shepherd's pie	Lamb	Left-over	
Martha Stewart	US	Shepherd's pie	Beef	Fresh	
John Torode (Note: Torode comments, "The great cottage pie – whoever worked this one out was a genius".)	Australia/Britain	Cottage pie	Beef	Fresh	
Antoine Westermann (Note: Westermann adds fennel to the mashed potato topping.)	France	Hachis Parmentier	Beef	Fresh or left-over braised	
Anne Willan	Britain/France/US	Hachis Parmentier	Beef	Fresh	
Antony Worrall Thompson	Britain	Shepherd's Pie	Lamb	Fresh	

== Similar dishes ==
Fillings for other pies with a mashed potato topping are numerous, and include artichoke hearts and red peppers; black pudding; chicken and spinach; chorizo; curried chicken; duck; rabbit; salmon; salt cod; turkey and ham; and flaked white fish with shrimps in a white sauce.

Other pies with non-pastry toppings include:

Name of dish	Place of origin	Description	Ref.
Cumberland pie	England	Pies of this name exist in two versions: traditional Cumberland pies, still served in Cumbria, have a pastry case, but others have a lamb or beef or pork-sausage filling covered by mashed potato topped with cheese and breadcrumbs.	
Empadão	Portugal	Meat, often veal, stewed in a tomato-based gravy and layered several times between mashed potatoes. Poultry or fish is sometimes used instead of meat	
Escondidinho	Brazil	The name, indicating "hidden", describes the way sun-dried meat is covered with a layer of manioc purée. The dish often includes cheese and chicken; cod is sometimes used instead of beef.	
Hamburger pie	United States	Adds vegetables (often frozen or tinned) to the minced meat ("hamburger") mixture; sometimes condensed tomato or mushroom soup. Typically topped with cheese. Most versions use a mashed potato topping, but some use cornmeal mush. Some are multi-layer.	
Картофельная запеканка (Potato casserole)	Russia	Usually three layers: potato-meat-potato, using pork or beef (often extended with fillers) and egg or flour added to the potatoes to make it easier to portion from a large pan. Often served in Soviet school and company cafeterias.	
Pastel de carne	Uruguay	The filling is similar to that of a cottage pie, with the addition of sliced hard-boiled eggs.	
Pastel de papas	Argentina, Chile	Similar to cottage pie; may also contain peppers.	
Pastel tutup	Indonesia	Made with any of several meats, with vegetables such as carrots and green peas and boiled eggs, all topped with mashed potato.	
Pâté chinois	Canada	Also known in Canada as shepherd's pie, consisting of a bottom layer of beef, a middle layer of creamed sweetcorn, topped with mashed potato.	
Pióg an aoire	Ireland	The Irish for shepherd's pie.	
Shepherdess pie	Other	Also called gardener's pie, shepherdless pie or foragers' pie: a vegetarian version made without meat or a vegan version made without meat and dairy.	

== See also ==
- British cuisine
- English cuisine
- French cuisine
- Irish cuisine
- List of English dishes
- List of French dishes
- List of Irish dishes
- List of meat and potato dishes
- List of pies, tarts and flans
- List of potato dishes
- Moussaka
- Pâté aux pommes de terre
- Pâté chinois
- Tavë kosi
- Welsh cuisine

== Notes, references and sources ==
=== Sources ===
- Acton, Eliza (1845). Modern Cookery, in all its Branches. London: Longmans. OCLC 969499797.
- Ayto, John (2002). An A-Z of food and drink. Oxford: Oxford University Press. ISBN 978-0-19-280352-8.
- Ayto, John (2012). The Diner's Dictionary: Food and Drink from A to Z (Second ed.). Oxford: Oxford University Press. ISBN 978-0-1986-6193-1.
- Beeton, Isabella (1861). The Book of Household Management. London: S.O. Beeton. OCLC 1040245021.
- Berry, Mary (1981). Mary Berry's Main Course. London: B. T. Batsford. ISBN 0-7134-0920-7.
- Berry, Mary (2008). Mary Berry's Stress-Free Kitchen. London: Headline. ISBN 978-0-7553-1729-5.
- Bikers, Hairy (2011). The Hairy Bikers'Perfect Pies:The Ultimate Pie Bible from the Kings of Pies. London: W&N. ISBN 978-1407239095.
- Bocuse, Paul (1982). Bocuse dans votre cuisine (in French). Paris: Flammarion. ISBN 2082000869.
- Carrier, Robert (1978). Great Main Dishes. London: Hamlyn. ISBN 978-0-6003-2012-8.
- Chovancova, Ilona (2005). Pies Without Pastry. London: Hachette. ISBN 978-1-8443-0150-8.
- Coffe, Jean-Pierre (1993). Comme à la maison. Paris: Plon. ISBN 978-2-2590-2578-2.
- Craig, Elizabeth (1940). 1500 Everyday Menus. London: Collins. OCLC 970777620.
- Crook, Susan (1998). The Survival Guide to Cooking in the Student Kitchen. London: Foulsham. ISBN 978-0-5720-2455-0.
- Dallas, E. S. (1877). Kettner's Book of the Table. London: Dulau. OCLC 771590401.
- Denny, Roz (1998). The New Vegetarian Cookbook. New York: Hermes House. ISBN 978-1-8403-8074-3.
- Diat, Louis (1946). French Cooking for Americans. Philadelphia: J. B. Lippincott. OCLC 1036371103.
- DiSpirito, Rocco (2005). Rocco's 5 Minute Flavor. New York: Scribner. ISBN 978-1-4516-3956-8.
- Dumas, Alexandre (1873). Grand dictionnaire de cuisine. Paris: Lemerre. OCLC 1040560779.
- Escoffier, Auguste (1907). A Guide to Modern Cookery. London: Heinemann. OCLC 5362680.
- Farmer, Fannie (1942) [1896]. The Boston Cooking-School Cook Book (Seventh ed.). Boston: Little, Brown and Co. OCLC 18077428.
- Fitzgerald, Heather; Howell, Tom; Pontisso, Robert, eds. (2006). Oxford Canadian Dictionary. Don Mills: Oxford University Press. ISBN 978-0-1954-2439-3.
- Grigson, Jane (1974). English Food. London: Macmillan. ISBN 978-0-3331-5213-3.
- Grigson, Jane (1984). The Observer Guide to British Cookery. London: Michael Joseph. ISBN 978-0-7181-2689-6.
- Grigson, Jane (1992). English Food. London: Ebury Press. ISBN 978-0-0917-7043-3.
- Guérard, Michel (1992). Minceur exquise. London: Pyramid. ISBN 978-1-8551-0048-0.
- Hartley, Dorothy (1999) [1954]. Food in England. London: Macdonald and Jane's. ISBN 978-1-8560-5497-3.
- Hayward, Vicky, ed. (1988). Cuisine Extraordinaire : Real French Cooking. London: Conran Octopus. ISBN 978-1-8502-9134-3.
- Hix, Mark (2005). British Food. London: Quadrille. ISBN 978-1-8440-0213-9.
- Hughes, Glyn (2017). The Lost Foods of England. Morrisville: Lulu. ISBN 978-0-2446-9104-2.
- Kerr, Graham (1991). Smart Cooking. New York: Doubleday. OCLC 1035369580.
- Kerridge, Tom (2014). Tom Kerridge's Best Ever Dishes. Bath: Absolute Press. ISBN 978-1-4729-0941-1.
- Leith, Prue; Waldegrave, Caroline (1980). Leith's Cookery Course. London: Andre Deutsch. ISBN 978-0-2339-7153-7.
- Lowe, James G., ed. (2016). The Merriam-Webster Dictionary. Springfield: Merriam-Webster. ISBN 978-0-8777-9295-6.
- Marcotte, Louis-François (2008). Simple et chic. Montreal: Flammarion. ISBN 978-2-89077-349-3.
- Miller, Jan, ed. (2006). Better Homes and Gardens New Cook Book. Des Moines, Idaho: Meredith Books. ISBN 978-0-6962-2403-4.
- Moore, Bruce, ed. (1999). The Australian Oxford Dictionary. Melbourne: Oxford University Press. ISBN 0-1955-0793-2.
- Nicholson, Florence (1898). "Simple Cookery Recipes". Co-operative News and Journal of Associated Industry. 29: 133.
- Orrey, Jeanette (2006). Second Helpings from the Dinner Lady. London: Bantam. ISBN 978-0-5930-5482-6.
- Paré, Jean (1997). Boeuf haché. Edmonton: Recipe Factory. ISBN 978-1-8968-9110-1.
- Patten, Marguerite (1984). Marguerite Patten's Cooks Diary. Glasgow: Collins. ISBN 1-7363-0761-4.
- Pellaprat, Henri Paul (1968). Everyday French Cooking. New York: New American Library. OCLC 1034661103.
- Pic, Anne-Sophie (2015) [2013]. Scook : The Complete Cookery Course. London: Jacqui Small. ISBN 978-1-9093-4287-3.
- Smith, Edna M. (2008). Aggies, Moms, and Apple Pie. College Station, Texas: Texas A&M University Press. ISBN 978-1-6034-4076-9.
- Ramsay, Gordon (2008). Cooking for Friends. London: HarperCollins. ISBN 978-0-0072-6703-3.
- Rayner, Jay (2016). The Ten (Food) Commandments. London: Penguin. ISBN 978-0-2419-7669-2.
- Rhodes, Gary (2001). Step-By-Step Cooking. London: Ebury. ISBN 978-0-0918-8085-9.
- Rockwood, Camilla, ed. (2009). Brewer's Dictionary of Phrase & Fable (eighteenth ed.). Edinburgh: Brewer's. ISBN 978-0-5501-0411-3.
- Roux, Michel Jr (2009). A Life in the Kitchen. London: Weidenfeld & Nicolson. ISBN 978-0-2978-4482-2.
- Rundell, Maria (1806). A New System of Domestic Cookery. London: J. Murray and J. Harding. OCLC 970770908.
- Saberi, Helen (1999). "Shepherd's pie". In Davidson, Alan (ed.). The Oxford Companion to Food. Oxford: Oxford University Press. ISBN 978-0-1921-1579-9.
- Saint-Ange, E. (2005). La bonne cuisine de Madame E. Saint-Ange. Berkeley: Ten Speed Press. ISBN 978-1-5800-8605-9. OCLC 1285661274.
- Sarasin, Keith (2024). Meat: The Ultimate Cookbook. Kennebunkport: Cider Mill Press. ISBN 978-1-4002-5194-0.
- Saulnier, Louis (1978) [1923]. Le répertoire de la cuisine (fourteenth ed.). London: Jaeggi. OCLC 1086737491.
- Scott-Aitken, Lynelle (2002). Portugal. Melbourne and London: Lonely Planet. ISBN 978-1-8645-0111-7.
- Smith, Delia (1987). One is Fun!. London: Coronet. ISBN 978-0-3403-8959-1.
- Smith, Delia (1974). The Evening Standard Cookbook. London: Thames and Hudson. ISBN 978-0-5000-1122-5.
- Torode, John (2008). Beef. London: Quadrille. ISBN 978-1-8440-0690-8.
- Westermann, Antoine (1999). La cuisine ménagère d'un grand chef (in French). Geneva: Minerva. ISBN 978-2-8307-0539-3.
- Willan, Anne (1993). Creative Casseroles. London and New York: Dorling Kindersley. OCLC 1029039921.
- Willan, Anne (2005). Perfect Fish Classics. New York: Barnes & Noble. ISBN 978-0-7607-6169-4.
- Williamson, Mrs (1849). The Practice of Cookery and Pastry. Edinburgh: Forrester. OCLC 314615399.
- Woodforde, James (1924). The Diary of a Country Parson. Vol. III. London: Oxford University Press. OCLC 1156380998.
