= Pâté chinois =

French Canadian dish

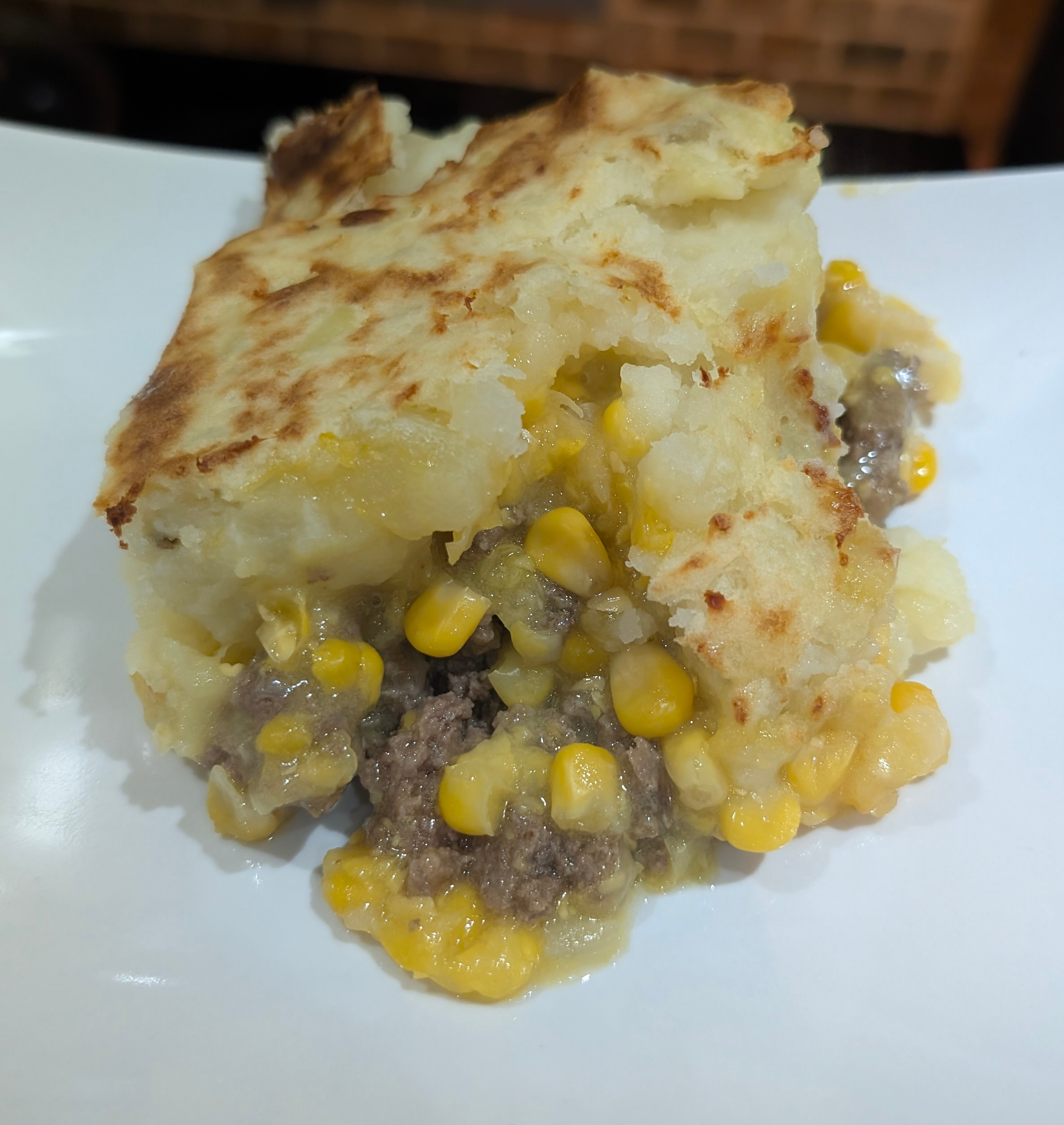
- A pâté chinois; half niblets, half creamed corn
- Type: Savoury pie Casserole
- Place of origin: Quebec, Canada
- Invented: 1930s
- Main ingredients: Ground beef, onions, maize or creamed corn, mashed potatoes, vinegar

Pâté chinois (pronounced [pɑte ʃinwa], lit. 'Chinese pie') is a traditional Quebec dish consisting of three layers baked in the oven: ground beef, corn, and mashed potato, arranged in that order. It is commonly served sprinkled with paprika and accompanied by simple condiments such as pickles or ketchup.

Of French-Canadian origin, probably from Montreal, pâté chinois has informally been regarded as the "national dish of Quebec" following a public poll organized by the newspaper Le Devoir.

== Related dishes and variants ==
The dish is often compared to shepherd's pie, cottage pie, and the French hachis Parmentier, from which it mainly differs by the addition of a layer of corn between the meat and mashed potatoes. Ethnologists Bernard Arcand and Serge Bouchard have noted that pâté chinois shares similarities with pemmican, a preparation combining meat and corn, both readily available ingredients in North America.

Pâté chinois is notable for its many variations and flexible composition. Corn may be used in different forms (fresh, frozen, canned, or creamed), while the meat may be commercially ground beef or leftover roast transformed at home. Beef is sometimes replaced with other meats such as horse, venison, or moose, or with plant-based ingredients such as lentils or tofu. Some contemporary chefs also propose more elaborate or gourmet interpretations of the dish.

== Origins and etymology ==
Several theories have been proposed regarding the origins of pâté chinois and its name. They have been studied by the food historian Jean-Pierre Lemasson and linguist Gabriel Martin. Their research shows that pâté chinois originated among the French-Canadian working class in Montreal during the 1910s and became widespread during the Great Depression in the 1930s.

=== Discredited hypotheses ===
A series of hypotheses advanced by the researcher Jean-Marie Francœur traces the origins of pâté chinois back to New France in the 17th century. According to Francœur, the dish appeared shortly after the establishment of the colony with the arrival of René-Robert Cavelier de La Salle. He further argued that the expression pâté chinois was coined by François Dollier de Casson, who supposedly mocked La Salle's failed expedition. Martin summarizes Francœur's proposal as follows: "Francœur traces the name pâté chinois back to the seventeenth century and suggests, among other possibilities, that it arose from a rebracketing of pâté d'échine ('pork shoulder pie') into pâté de Chine, which later became pâté chinois." Martin concludes that this hypothesis does not withstand critical examination of the evidence: "The hypothesis is appealing, but the chronology does not fit: the name pâté chinois is only attested from the twentieth century onward, and no known linguistic evidence genuinely suggests that it dates back to New France."

According to some authors, including chef Jean Soulard, pâté chinois originated in the late nineteenth century during the construction of the Canadian transcontinental railway. Chinese labourers would allegedly have been served a meal prepared from inexpensive ingredients thought to be readily available, eventually giving rise to pâté chinois. This hypothesis was rejected first by Lemasson and later by Francœur. Martin likewise notes that "various anachronisms seriously undermine this hypothesis."

According to linguist Claude Poirier, the name pâté chinois is a calque of China pie, referring to the town of China, Maine, where many French Canadians emigrated during the Industrial Revolution because of the lack of employment in Quebec. Under this interpretation, the local specialty known as China pie would simply have become pâté chinois after being translated into French. This explanation is mentioned in the Dictionnaire historique du français québécois. The dictionary Usito presents it as an established fact, stating that the name pâté chinois derives from the North American English expression China pie, with China referring to the town in Maine. Martin, however, argues that this explanation rests solely on "the testimony of an informant collected second-hand" and that it has raised "reservations among specialists". Lemasson considers the explanation "entirely implausible", while the Office québécois de la langue française likewise judges the evidence supporting it to be "unconvincing".

=== Most likely hypotheses ===
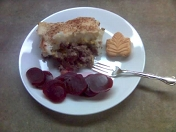
A plate of pâté chinois served with pickled beets.

After examining these hypotheses, Lemasson and Martin both place the origins of pâté chinois in Quebec and date its emergence to the first half of the 20th century. According to Lemasson, a 1941 version of the recipe used rice instead of potatoes, which may explain the adjective chinois (Chinese). Martin pushes the date earlier than Lemasson's example, identifying references as early as 1931 and even 1917. He argues that pâté chinois likely emerged in Montreal's working-class communities, as part of French Canadian cuisine, and became popular during the economic crisis of the 1930s. He suggests the name may stem from a “smiling irony,” in which “a purely typical Canadian dish was given a name evoking a distant country.”

== Cultural references ==
The popular phrase “steak, blé d’Inde, patates” describes the basic composition of pâté chinois: ground beef, topped with corn (kernels or creamed), then mashed potatoes. This phrase, from the Québécois humorous television program La Petite Vie, is used in a running gag featuring the character Thérèse Paré Pinard, who repeatedly fails to properly prepare the dish. For example, she places the three ingredients side by side instead of layering them, or forgets to mash the potatoes.

The film Pâté chinois, directed in 1997 by Philippe Falardeau, is a satirical short film about Asian immigration to Canada.

== See also ==
- List of pies, tarts and flans
