= Sylvie Vincent =

Canadian anthropologist and ethnologist (1941–2020)

- Born: Sylvie du Crest; 27 April 1941
- Died: 30 April 2020 (aged 79); Montreal, Quebec
- Occupation: Anthropologist

Sylvie Vincent (née du Crest; 27 April 1941 – 30 April 2020) was a Canadian anthropologist and ethnologist.

== Life ==
Vincent was editor-in-chief of the magazine Recherches amérindiennes au Québec, which she co-founded in the early 1970s.

In 1972, she began working with the Innu writer Joséphine Bacon, who helped Vincent as an interpreter. During her various projects, Vincent worked with numerous First Nations tribes of Canada, such as the Cree, the Algonquins, and the Wyandots. Throughout her career, she collaborated with many well-known anthropologists, such as Bernard Arcand, Serge Bouchard, José Mailhot, and Rémi Savard.

In 2009, Vincent received the Prix des Dix for her remarkable, personal contribution to the history of the First Nations of Quebec.

== Death ==
A diabetic, Vincent died from COVID-19 on 30 April 2020, at the age of 79, during the COVID-19 pandemic in Canada.

== Works ==
- Les Amérindiens dans les Annales de la Propagation de la Foi (1971)
- L'image de l'Amérindien dans les manuels scolaires du Québec (1979)
- Comment les Québécois ne sont pas des sauvages (1979)
- Baie James et Nord québécois : dix ans après (1988)
- "Chapitre 27. La révélation d’une force politique : les Autochtones" in Le Québec en jeu. Comprendre les grands défis (1992)
- "Les relations entre le Québec et les autochtones. Brève analyse d'un récit gouvernemental." in Cahiers du PÉQ (1995)
- Le récit de Uepishtikueiau : l'arrivée des Français à Québec selon la tradition orale innue (2003)
- Vincent, S. (2004). Apparent compatibility, real incompatibility: Native and western versions of history—The Innu example. In J.R. Clammer, S. Poirier, and E. Schwimmer (Eds.), Figured worlds: Ontological obstacles in intercultural relations, pp. 132–147. Toronto. University of Toronto Press.

== Distinctions ==
- Prix Eaford (1992)
- Prix des Dix (2009)
