= Prix Victor-Barbeau =

The Prix Victor-Barbeau is a Québécois literary prize awarded each year to an author for an essay which is judged to be of very high quality by a jury made up of three members from the Académie des lettres du Québec.

== List of Winners ==
Year	Title	Author(s)
1988	Du Canada au Québec	Heinz Weinman
1989	L’écologie du réel	Pierre Nepveu
1990	Lire le fragment. Transfert et théorie de la lecture chez Roland Barthes	Ginette Michaud
1991	A History of Archaeological Thought	Bruce G. Trigger
1992	l'Amour du Pauvre	Jean Larose
1993	Judith Jasmin, de feu et de flamme	Colette Beauchamp
1994	Les arts visuels au Québec dans les années soixante	Francine Couture
1995	Du stéréotype à la littérature	Daniel Castillo Durante
1996	L’Oumigmatique ou l’objectif documentaire	Pierre Perrault
1997	L'envol des signes. Borduas et ses lettres	Gilles Lapointe
1998	Le fils du notaire: Jacques Ferron, 1921-1949 : genèse intellectuelle d'un écrivain	Marcel Olscamp
1999	Nationalité et modernité	Daniel Jacques
2000	Fractions 2	Jean Marcel
2001	L'humanité improvisée	Pierre Vadeboncœur
2002	L'Entretien du désespoir	René Lapierre
2003	Exercices de désœuvrement	Robert Melançon
2003	Un temps éventuel	Michel van Schendel
2004	La Distance habitée	François Paré
2005	Une politique de la douceur	Paul Chamberland
2006	Condamner à mort. Le meurtre et la loi à l'écran	Catherine Mavrikakis
2007	La Prison magique	Charlotte Melançon
2008	Pierres de touche	Roland Bourneuf
2009	La Fatigue d’être. Saint-Denys Garneau, Claude Gauvreau, Hubert Aquin	Jacques Beaudry
2010	Le Complexe d'Hermès - Regards philosophiques sur la traduction	Charles Le Blanc
2011	La Conscience du désert	Michel Biron
2012	Espaces artistiques et modèles pionniers. Tom Thompson et Jean-Paul Riopelle	Louise Vigneault
2013	Chemins perdus, chemins trouvés	Jacques Brault
2014	Le Naufragé du vaisseau d'or	Yvette Francoli
2015	Vortex: La vérité dans le tourbillon de l'information	Michel Lemay
2016	Le Roman sans aventure	Isabelle Daunais
2017	Vies livresques	Robert Lévesque
2018	Le peuple rieur	Serge Bouchard et Marie-Christine Lévesque
2019	L’âge de l’irréalité : Solitude et empaysagement au Canada français 1860-1930	Vincent Lambert
2020	De préférence la nuit	Stanley Péan
2021	L’Œil du maître : Figures de l’imaginaire colonial québécois	Dalie Giroux
2022	Vie(s) d’Eugène Seers / Louis Dantin : une biochronique littéraire	Pierre Hébert
2023	L’île aux démons – et autres mirages cartographiques de l’Amérique du Nord (1507-1647)	Alban Berson
2024	Faire œuvre à deux : le livre surréaliste au féminin	Andrea Oberhuber
