= Léa Bidaut =

French chef (1908–1996)

- Born: 17 May 1908; Le Creusot, Saône-et-Loire, France
- Died: 30 May 1996 (aged 88); Pierre-Bénite, Lyon, France
- Culinary career
- Cooking style: Lyonnaise cuisine
- Current restaurant: La Voûte chez Léa

Léa Bidaut (17 May 1908 – 30 May 1996), known as Mère Léa, was a French cook and Lyon Mère. A well-known representative of the Lyonnaise cuisine, she began her career in 1927 working during her teens for wealthy people in her hometown such as the industrial Schneider family before moving to Lyon. From 1938, Bidaut ran her first restaurant, later known as "Daniel et Denise", in the Rue Tupine, Place Bellecour, Lyon, for four years. She opened her restaurant "La Voûte chez Léa" nearby in 1943; it received a star in the Michelin Guide.

She was known for walking round the stalls of the Saint-Antoine market on the quay next to her restaurant, pushing her cart emblazoned with a sign "Attention, faible femme mais forte gueule" (Attention, weak woman, but big mouth). She ended her tours of the market without spending hardly any money, and she did wonders with very little, especially her asparagus tips.

She joined the Les Toques Blanches Lyonnaises in 1978. The restaurant was taken over in January 1980 by chef Philippe Rabatel and she retired in 1981. The restaurant was sold in 2013 to partners Christian Morel, Michelin-starred chef Christian Têtedoie, and sommelier Laurence Ginet. As of 2022 the restaurant is still in operation.

== Specialties ==
Bidaut followed the traditions of Lyon's famous female cooks – the Mères lyonnaises – in avoiding over-elaborate dishes, preferring to offer fairly simple food of the highest quality. In addition to her specialty, sauerkraut with champagne, the restaurant was famous for its potato paillasson, chicken in vinegar, the orange-flavoured rabbit leg, and the macaroni gratin, a recipe which she taught Mère Brazier.
