= Jacques Lacoursière =

Canadian historian (1932–2021)

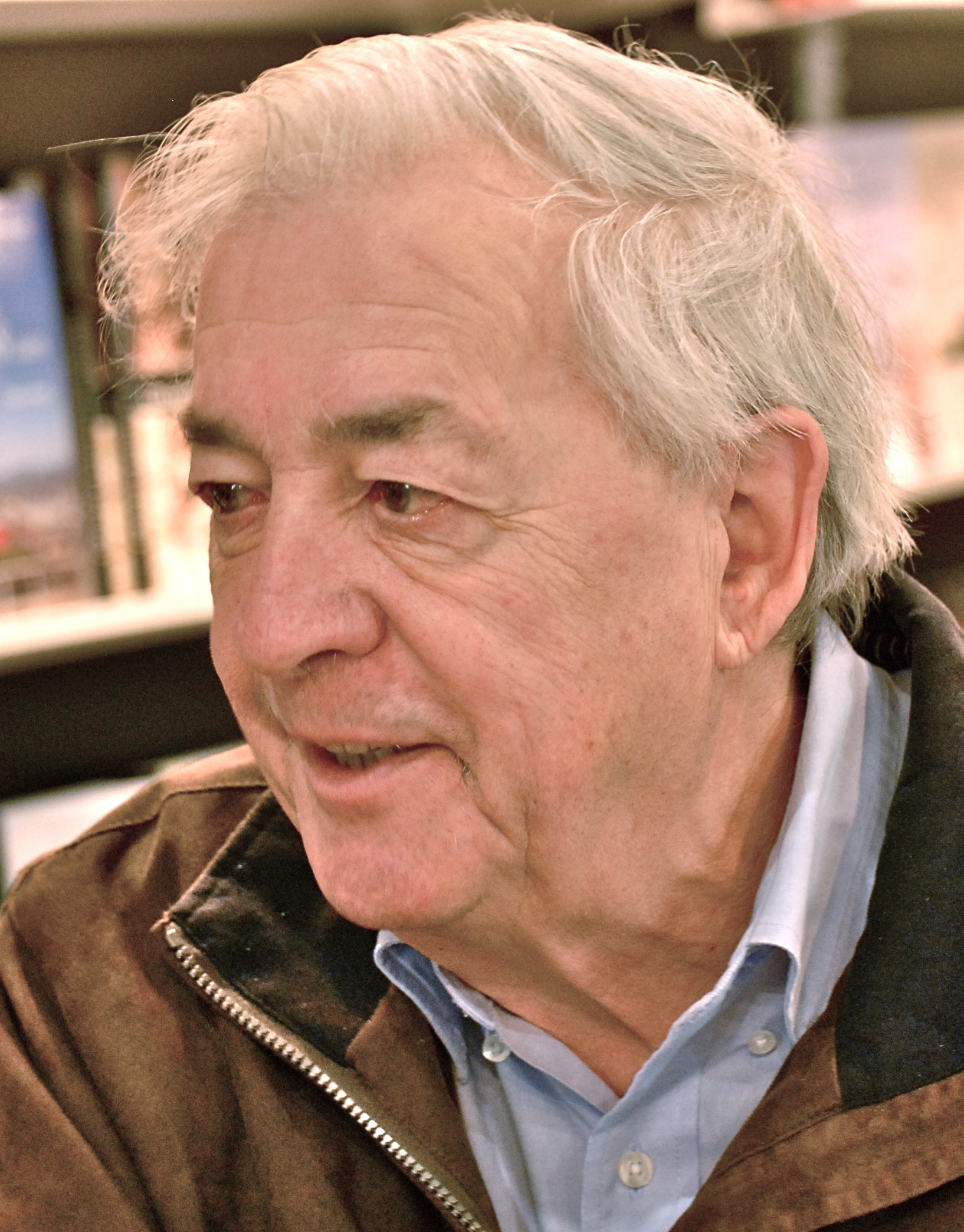
Jacques Lacoursière at the 2010 Montreal Book Fair

Jacques Lacoursière, CM CQ (4 May 1932 – 1 June 2021) was a Canadian TV host, author and historian specialized in Quebec's history.

== Life and career ==
Lacoursière was born in Shawinigan, in 1932, in the Mauricie region, and then resided in Beauport in the Greater Quebec area.

Lacoursière held an M.A. degree in history from the University of Ottawa.

Jacques Lacoursière first destined himself for priesthood and bought himself a cassock to that effect. He later became interested in law and then lent a hand to the family business. At the end of the 1950s, he enters the École normale Maurice-L.-Duplessis at Trois-Rivières to study pedagogy and obtains a baccalaureate at the end of his twenties. The historian admits that he was not originally made for history and that he loved literature. It was as a student of Denis Vaugeois at the École normale that Jacques Lacoursière began to take a strong interest in history. The professor, then younger than him, gave him the bug for what would become a late vocation.

Lacoursière marries Monique Dubois at Trois-Rivières in 1957.

In the 1960s, he is a collaborator at Libre Nation, a nationalist and independentist newspaper. His great friend Denis Vaugeois in a tribute from 2018 writes: "Maybe a nationalist, but not enough to be uncomfortable in federal institutions." (Quote translated from French).

He enters Quebec's public service at the Ministère de l'éducation in 1968 and the Ministère des affaires intergouvernementales as political attaché in 1969.

Fascinated by history, he worked a long time for the history magazine Nos Racines, work that cannot be found again today as it was never published again. The author took his « Nos Racines » texts and reworked them for his new collection Histoire populaire du Québec, in five books. He is one of the creators of Le Boréal Express, with Denis Vaugeois and Gilles Boulet.

=== Career in the medias ===
In 1977 and 1978, Jacques Lacoursière was the researcher for the Duplessis TV series, realized by Denys Arcand and shown at Radio-Canada. In 1996, he participated in the making of the history TV series Épopée en Amérique realized by Gilles Carle. Lacoursière is the brother of novel writer Louise Lacoursière.

=== Passing ===
Jacques Lacoursière died on 1 June 2021, at 89 years old.

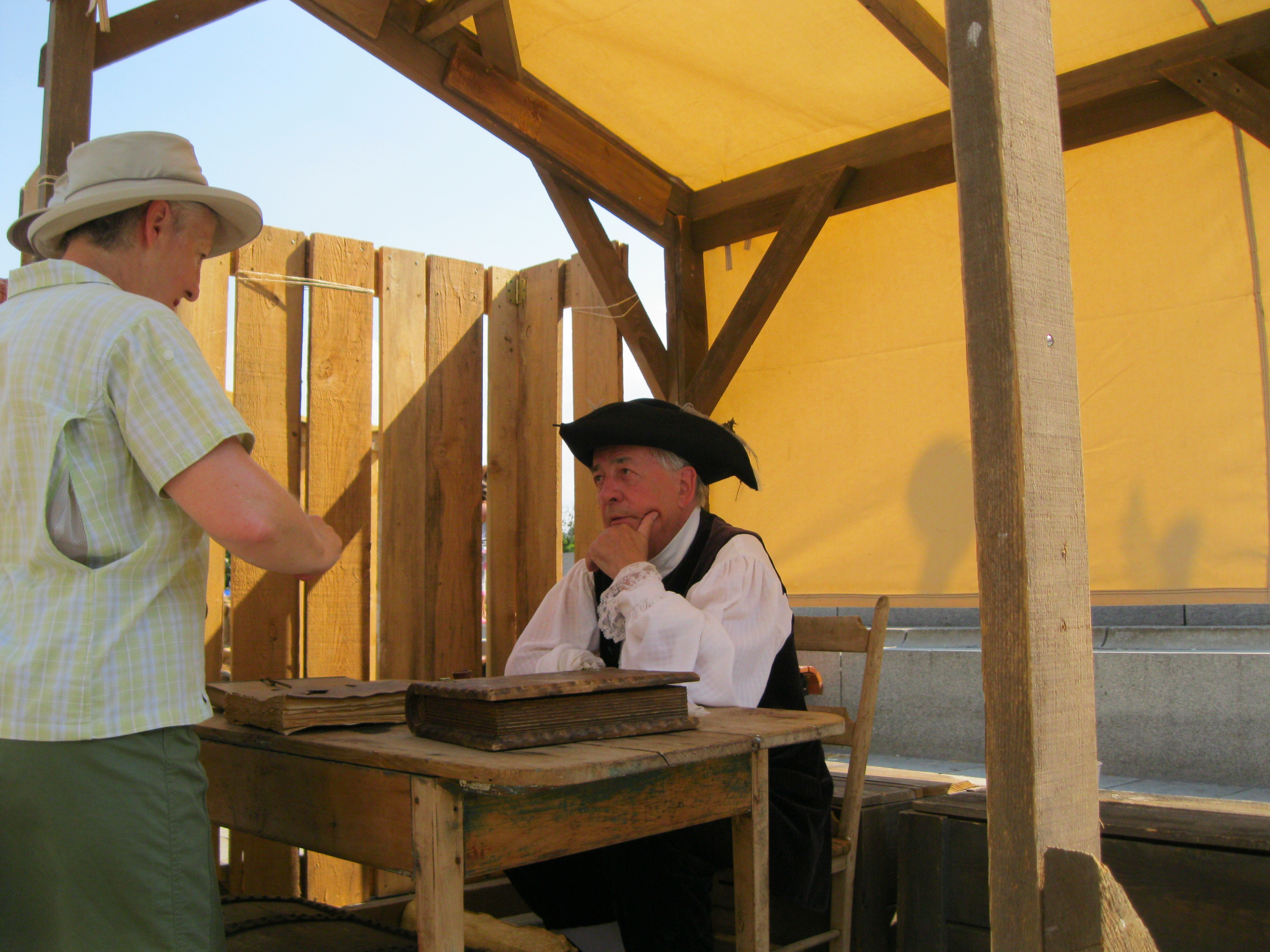
Jacques Lacoursière at the flea market in the 18th century atmosphere at Pointe-à-Callière on 26 August 2012

== Honors ==
- 1999: Prix de l'Institut canadien de Québec
- 2002: Knight of the National Order of Quebec
- 2003: Médaille de l'Académie des lettres du Québec
- 2006: Member of the Order of Canada
- 2007: Prix Adagio
- 2007: Prix Gérard-Morisset
- 2008: Legion of Honour (France)
- 2008: Honorary degree from the Université de Moncton, Edmundston Campus
- 2008: Honorary degree from the Université du Québec à Montréal
- 2012: Commissaire à la Commission de toponymie du Québec
- 2015: Knight of the Order of La Pléiade

== Published books ==
Over the years Lacoursière has written many books:

- 1968: Histoire, 1534–1968, published by the Boréal Express team, under supervision by Denis Vaugeois and Jacques Lacoursière
- 1969: Les Troubles de 1837–38, Denis Vaugeois and Jacques Lacoursière
- 1970: L'Acte de Québec et la Révolution américaine, Denis Vaugeois and Jacques Lacoursière
- 1972: Notre histoire: Québec—Canada, Jacques Lacoursière
- 1972: Alarme citoyens ! : l'affaire Cross-Laporte, du connu à l'inconnu, Montréal, Éditions La Presse, 1972
- 1974: Québec 72–73
- 1976: Canada—Québec : synthèse historique, Denis Vaugeois and Jacques Lacoursière
- 1979: Il était une fois... le Québec, research under supervision by Jacques Lacoursière
- 1991: Mémoires québécoises, by Jacques Mathieu and Jacques Lacoursière
- 1995–1997: Histoire populaire du Québec, in five books, Éditions du Septentrion (reissue of the first four books in 2013, 2020 and 2021)
- 1995: A People's History of Quebec, a condensed version of the five "Histoire populaire du Québec" books, by Jacques Lacoursière and translated into English by Robin Philpot, publisher of Baraka Books, associated with Denis Vaugeois, publisher of Éditions Septentrion, the original publisher of the French-Canadian five books series
- 1997: Monsieur le président : les orateurs et les présidents depuis 1792
- 2000: La Chanson comme miroir de poche : conversation avec Jacques Lacoursière / Gilles Vigneault
- 2000: Canada-Québec : synthèse historique, 1534–2000, new edition, Jacques Lacoursière, Jean Provencher and Denis Vaugeois ISBN 2-89448-186-1 ; new edition updated in 2011 under the title: Canada-Québec, 1534–2010 ISBN 978-2894486535
- 2001: Shawinigan, 100 ans d'histoire : De l'effervescence au renouveau, Éditions des Glanures, Shawinigan, 2001. 326 p. ISBN 2-920764-34-9
- 2002: Une histoire du Québec / racontée par Jacques Lacoursière, Éditions du Septentrion, Québec ISBN 978-2-89448-322-0
- 2005: L'Île-des-Sœurs : d'hier à aujourd'hui, Montréal,
- 2008: Histoire populaire du Québec, (book 5)
- 2008: Québec et sa région, Montréal, Éditions de l'Homme
