= Marie-Christine Lévesque =

Canadian author (1958–2020)

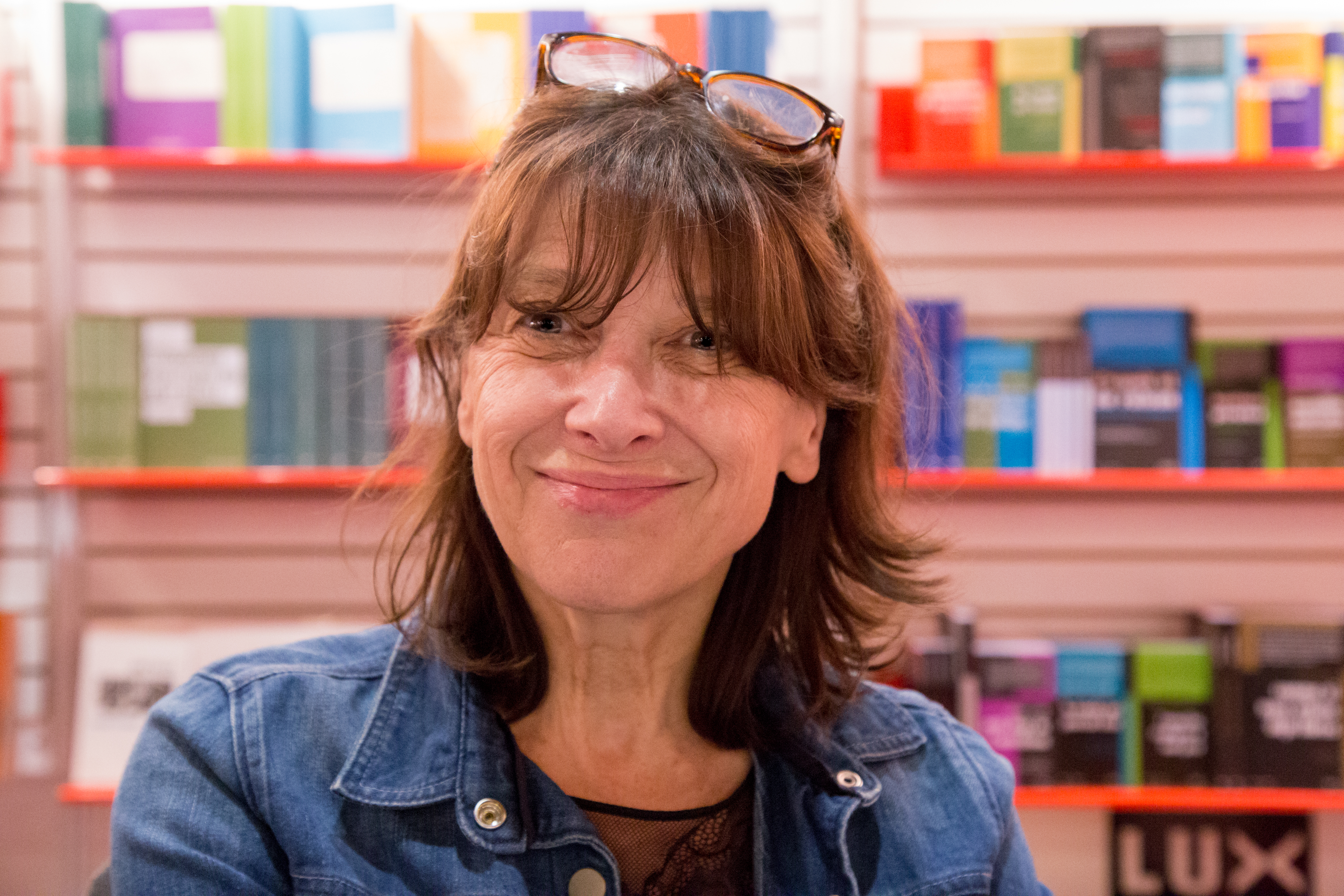
- Lévesque at the 2017 Salon du livre de Montréal
- Born: 1958
- Died: 16 July 2020 (aged 61–62)
- Occupations: Writer and editor
- Notable work: —Elles ont fait l’Amérique : De remarquables oubliés, tome 1, —Le peuple rieur. Hommage à mes amis innus
- Spouse: Serge Bouchard
- Awards: 2005 Applied Arts Award; 2018 Le Prix Victor-Barbeau

Marie-Christine Lévesque (1958 – 16 July 2020) was a Canadian art director, author and editor. As an art director she won the 2005 Applied Arts Award for the cover design of 9 Vues. Her partner was Serge Bouchard and she co-authored books with him including Elles ont fait l’Amérique : De remarquables oubliés, tome 1 and Le peuple rieur. Hommage à mes amis innus, the latter of which won the 2018 Le Prix Victor-Barbeau award. Her writings explored the lives of North American people from the 16th century to the 19th century and the Innu people.

== Early life ==
Lévesque is the daughter of Gérard D. Levesque and Denyse Lefort. She grew up beside an indigenous reserve but was raised to be scared of this group of people.

== Professional career ==
Lévesque started her career as an advertising designer and worked as an art director for book jackets. She received the 2005 Applied Arts Award for the cover design of 9 Vues, a book presenting the engravings of Louise Masson that accompanied the poetry of Daniel Danis. She also received a 2005 Applied Arts Award as the art director for Peau/Parfum/Noire.

Lévesque worked as an editor before committing to writing full-time. In 2011 Lévesque co-wrote Elles ont fait l’Amérique : De remarquables oubliés, tome 1 with her husband Serge Bouchard. The book is a compilation of 15 biographies of women in North America who are not popularly known about and inspired by an Ici Radio-Canada Première radio show called De remarquables oubliés. In 2012, Lévesque's husband Serge Bouchard was invited by the Essipit Band Council to write the history of the Innu people and Lévesque accompanied her husband to co-write and edit the work. While with the Innu people she was inspired by her husband to appreciate the Indigenous community and the nature around them. The writings were released as an essay in 2017 called Le peuple rieur. Hommage à mes amis innus and received the Le Prix Victor-Barbeau award. It was also the 27th bestselling book in Quebec independent bookstores in 2018.

== Personal life and death ==
Lévesque adopted a child from China with her partner Serge Bouchard in 2003. She had a daughter named Lou. Lévesque died on 16 July 2020 of brain cancer. At the time of her death she was preparing to publish a poetry collection.

== Writing style ==
In describing her writing style, Lévesque said, "I am literary, minimalist." (Note: Original quote, in French: "Je suis littéraire, minimaliste.") When describing Elles ont fait l'Amérique, Laurence Clerfeuille said the writing was, "Dense, meticulous, sometimes moving, the stories skillfully combine romantic and socio-historical elements." (Note: Original quote, in French: "Denses, minutieux, émouvants parfois, les récits allient habilement éléments romanesques et socio-historiques.") However, "A reader not accustomed to the historical context may perhaps get lost at times in certain incidental information." (Note: Original quote, in French: "Un lecteur non accoutumé au contexte historique pourra peut-être s'égarer parfois dans certaines informations accessoires") Michel Lapierre of Le Devoir, when describing Ils ont couru l’Amérique, said that Lévesque and Serge Bouchard, "share an admirable talent for storytelling." (Note: Original quote, in French: "partageant un admirable talent de conteur")

== Influence ==
In 2020 Alexandre Castonguay, Patrice Dubois and Soleil Launière created a theatrical show called Courir l'Amérique based on Lévesque's books Elles ont fait l’Amérique and Ils ont couru l’Amérique. The artists toured their production across Canada.

== List of works ==
Co-written with Serge Bouchard

- Elles ont fait l’Amérique : De remarquables oubliés, tome 1 (They Made America: The Remarkable Forgotten, Volume 1) Montreal: Lux Éditeur, 2011.
- Les images que nous sommes : 60 ans de cinéma québécois (The Images that we are: 60 Years of Quebec Cinema) Montreal: Éditions de l'Homme, 2013.
- Ils ont couru l’Amérique : De remarquables oubliés, tome 2 (They Ran America: The Remarkable Forgotten, Volume 2) Montreal: Lux Éditeur, 2014
- Le peuple rieur. Hommage à mes amis innus (The Laughing People. Tribute to my Innu Friends) Montreal: Lux Éditeur, 2017.
