= Dalie Giroux =

Dalie Giroux (born 1974) is a Canadian political scientist and writer, who has been a professor in the School of Political Studies at the University of Ottawa since 2003. She is most noted for her 2026 non-fiction book Penser croche, which won the Governor General's Award for French-language non-fiction at the 2026 Governor General's Awards.

She won the Prix Victor-Barbeau in 2021 for L’Œil du maître : Figures de l’imaginaire colonial québécois.
