= Prix Gérard-Morisset =

Quebecois cultural award

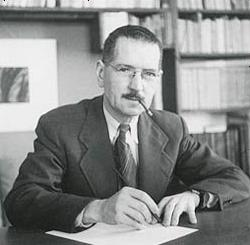
Gérard Morisset, 1937

The Prix Gérard-Morisset is an award by the Government of Quebec that is part of the Prix du Québec, given to individuals who have made an outstanding contribution to preserving and explaining Québec's cultural heritage. The activities recognized for this award are research, creative work, training, production, preservation and dissemination in the areas of cultural property, archives, museology and traditional folk culture. It is named in honour of Gérard Morisset.

== Winners ==
- 1992 - Jean-Claude Marsan
- 1993 - Carmen Gill-Casavant
- 1994 - Phyllis Lambert
- 1995 - Maurice Lemire
- 1996 - Michel Lessard
- 1997 - France Gagnon-Pratte
- 1998 - Jean-Claude Dupont
- 1999 - Luc Noppen
- 2000 - Not awarded
- 2001 - Carol Couture
- 2002 - Norman Clermont
- 2003 - Marcel Junius
- 2004 - John R. Porter
- 2005 - Cyril Simard
- 2006 - Paul-Louis Martin
- 2007 - Jacques Lacoursière
- 2008 - Laurier Lacroix
- 2009 - Marcel Moussette
- 2010 - François-Marc Gagnon
- 2011 - Jean Provencher
- 2012 - Dinu Bumbaru
- 2013 - Madeleine Juneau
- 2014 - Jacques Mathieu
- 2015 - Serge Bouchard
- 2016 - Jules Bélanger
- 2017 - Jean Simard
- 2018 - Christina Cameron
- 2019 - Jocelyn Bérubé
- 2020 - Claude Dubé
- 2021 - Yvette Mollen
- 2022 - Lucie K. Morriset
- 2023 - Pierre Lahoud
- 2024 - Raymond Montpetit
- 2025 - William Moss
