= Jules Bélanger =

Canadian professor (1929–2021)

- Born: 13 November 1929; Nouvelle, Quebec, Canada
- Died: 5 February 2021 (aged 91); Gaspé, Quebec, Canada
- Occupation: Professor

Jules Bélanger (13 November 1929 – 5 February 2021) was a Canadian professor.

== Distinctions ==
- Prix Gérard-Morisset (2016)
