= Cyril Simard =

Canadian architect and ethnologist (1938–2026)

- Born: 23 May 1938; Baie-Saint-Paul, Quebec, Canada
- Died: 10 May 2026 (aged 87)
- Education: Université Laval
- Occupations: Architect; ethnologist

Cyril Simard (23 May 1938 – 10 May 2026) was a Canadian architect and ethnologist.

Simard was the designer of the exhibition Terre des Hommes at the Expo 67 in Montreal. In 1970, he became the director of the Centrale d’artisanat du Québec. He earned his doctorate from the Université Laval in 1986 with a thesis titled Économuséologie : comment rentabiliser une entreprise culturelle. His works have been archived at the Bibliothèque et Archives nationales du Québec.

Simard died on 10 May 2026, at the age of 87.

== Distinctions ==
- Member of the Royal Society of Canada (1996)
- Officer of the National Order of Quebec (2005)
- Prix Gérard-Morisset (2005)
- Médaille de la Ville de Québec (2006)
