= Empadão =

Portuguese traditional dish

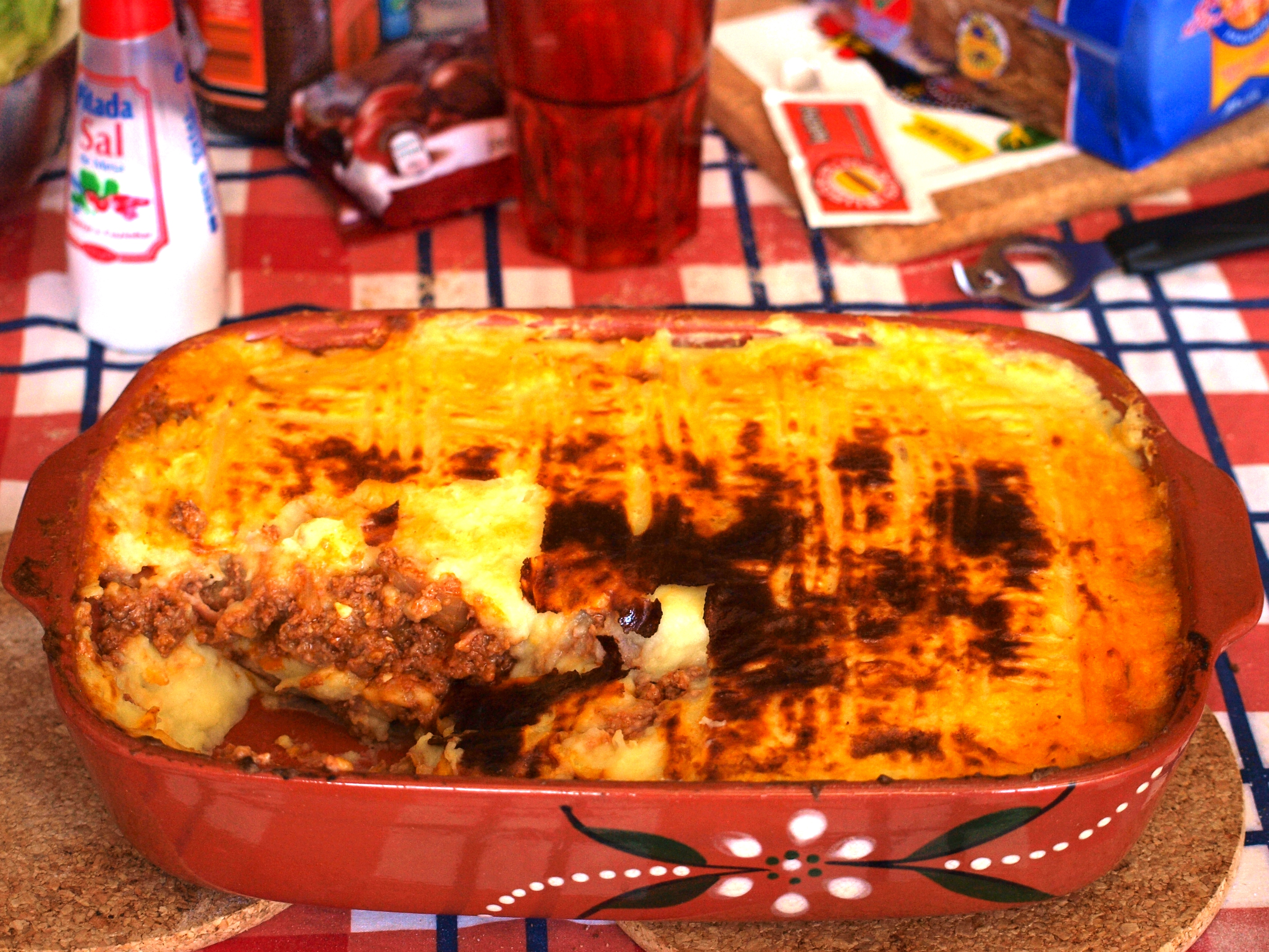
Empadão

Empadão is a traditional Portuguese dish, also popular in Brazil. It is made in an oven and can contain red meat, chicken, tuna, codfish and seafood between layers of mashed potato, dry dough, rice, bread or inside of wheat flour pasta, although the ground meat-mashed potatoes version is the more traditionally used, similar to the English shepherd's pie.

The filling consists usually of a refogado of red ground/sliced meat or codfish with onion and garlic. Tomato, mushrooms, sweet corn, green peas and requeijão are also used. In one recipe, empadão is made using only pão ralado (ground bread) and eggs as a filling which is then cooked in the oven like a pudding.

Olives are also used as a topping.
