= Mère =

Female cooks of the 18th through 20th centuries in France

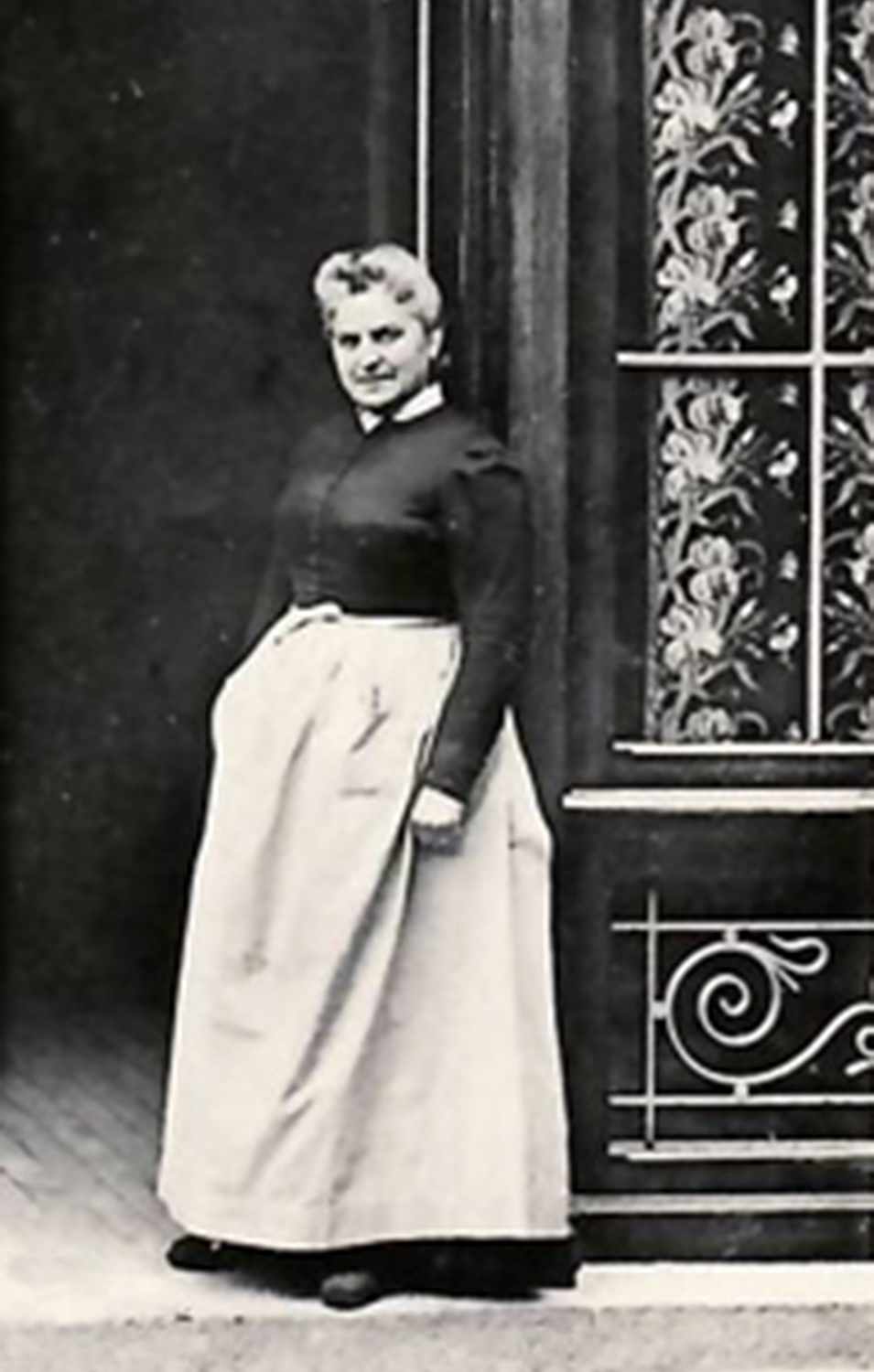
Mère Poulard in front of her restaurant

Mère (French: [mɛʁ], lit. 'mother') is an honorary title given to talented female professional cooks, many of whom had no formal training, in France during the 18th, 19th, and 20th centuries. Between 1759 and the end of the 20th century multiple women have been called Mère. Their work turned the city of Lyon and its environs into the gastronomic center of France and the world, and the most famous of them, Mère Brazier, is regarded as "the mother of modern French cooking".

== History ==
The first mentions of a Mère were in 1759 when Mère Guy, who cooked at an inn on the banks of the Rhône, became famous for her eel stew and in the early 1800s Mère Brigousse in the Charpennes district became known for her dumplings. Since then multiple talented female cooks, many of whom had no formal training, have been called by the title Mère. The practice of calling female cooks 'Mère' gained popularity during the 19th century, when gastronomic societies were popular, and reached its peak in the interwar years when talented cooks who had been working for wealthy bourgeois families were losing their positions due to changing household economics and automobile tourism was developing, so they set up in business as restaurateurs.

== Lyon ==
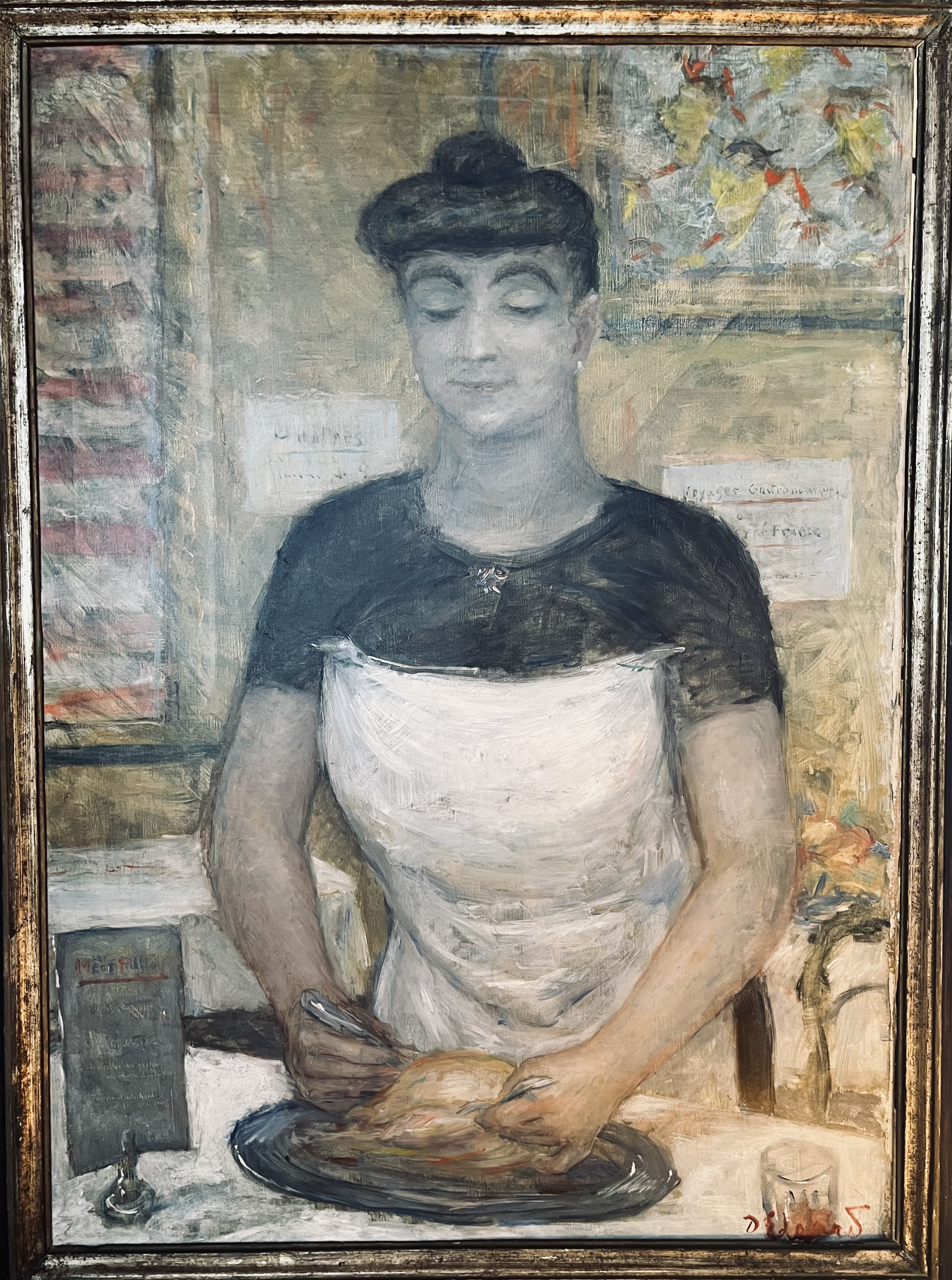
"La Mère Fillioux," painted by Edzard Dietz, 1927

Lyon is known as the "cradle" of the Mères, and the Mères had a profound effect on Lyonnaise cuisine, according to Curnonsky turning Lyon into the food capital of France and the world. According to Jean Vitaux, the Mères of Lyon "shaped an original, feminine and regional definition of gastronomy." Writing for Medium, Francois de Melogue said "(they) brought the gastronomic spotlight to Lyon, the undisputed gastronomical capital of France. Their influence and impact helped define and shape classic French cooking in modern times." According to Eater, their work "secured the city’s reputation for exceptional cuisine."

The first mention of a Mère of Lyons was in 1759 when Mère Guy, who cooked at an inn near the Rhône in Mulatières and became famous for her eel stew or eel matelote and her crawfish gratin. In the 1800s her granddaughter also became known as Mère Guy, "La Génie" (The Spirit). The restaurant, at 35 Quai Jean-Jacques Rousseau, was awarded three Michelin stars in 1936.

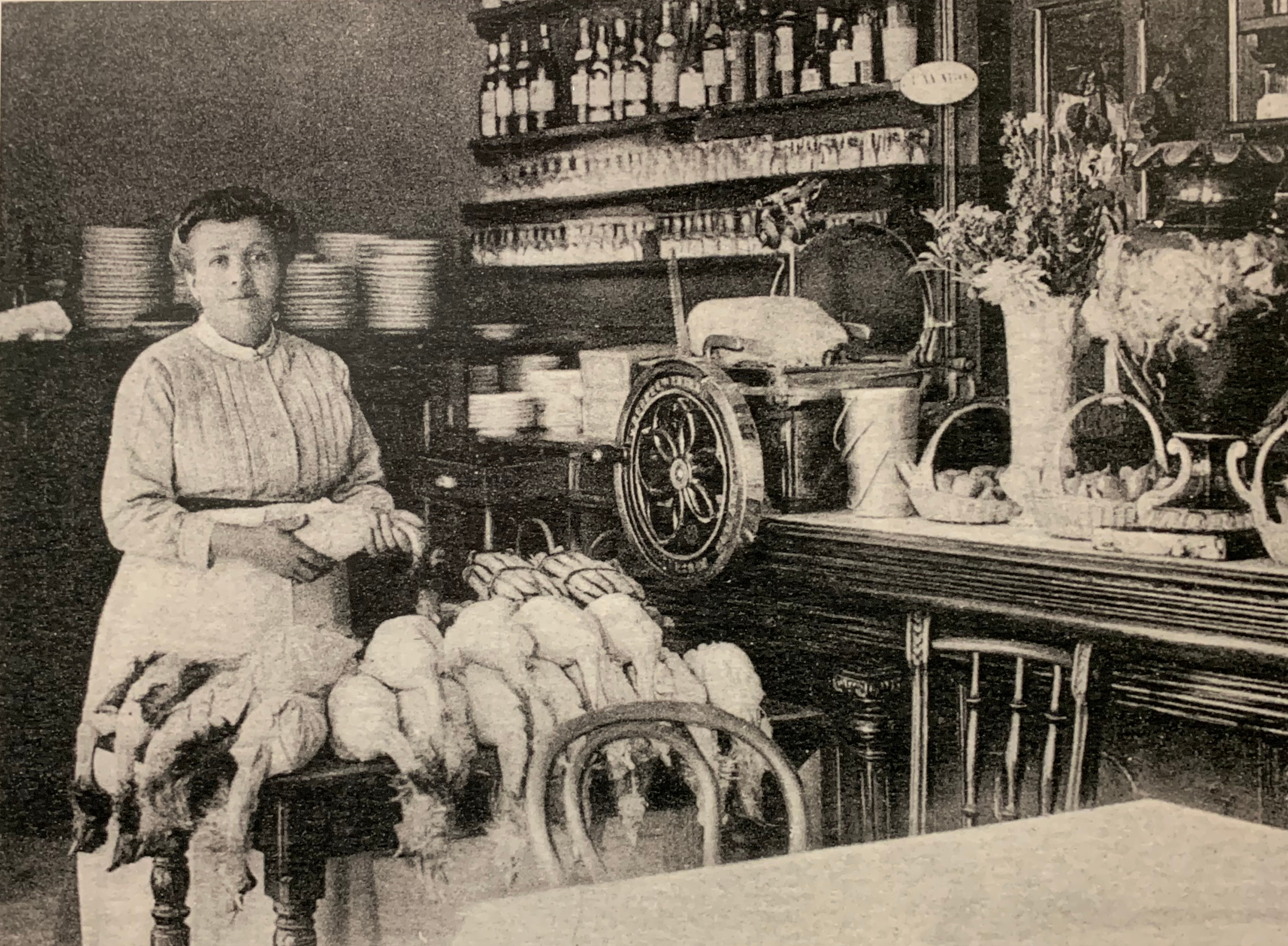
Mère Filloux

In the 1830s in the Charpennes quarter, Mère Brigousse or Brugousse, also known as La Mère des Amoureux (mother of lovers), was famous for a dish called Tétons de Vénus (breasts of Venus), a dish of giant dumplings popular among groups of young men dining stag for bachelor parties.

Mère Filloux or Fillioux, born Françoise Fayolle in 1865 in Puy-de-Dôme, is called La Reine des Poulardes and Empress of the Lyon Mothers. She was the first of the Mères whose recipes were still in use as of the early 21st century. She moved to Lyon in 1890 from Cunlhat and was hired as a cook by a local businessman. She created the dish poulet demi deuil (half-mourning chicken), which featured black truffles inserted under the white skin of the local breed of chicken and is considered a classic of French cuisine. She was also noted for her truffle-flavored cream soup and poached chicken, artichoke hearts stuffed with foie gras, quenelles and crawfish, and lobster with shallots, tomatoes, wine, and brandy. She claimed to have never made more than these five dishes, saying, "I know how to cook them, and I will never make any others." She married Louis Filloux in 1900 and bought a restaurant at 73 Rue Duquesne in Lyon's 6th arrondissement, where frequent customers were Gertrude Stein and Alice B. Toklas, who called her "an artist" at carving a chicken. She hired only women to work in her kitchen. She retired in 1925 and is estimated to have carved a half million chickens during her career. Near the end of her career she became such a celebrated cook that female cooks outside of Lyon started to be called Mère.

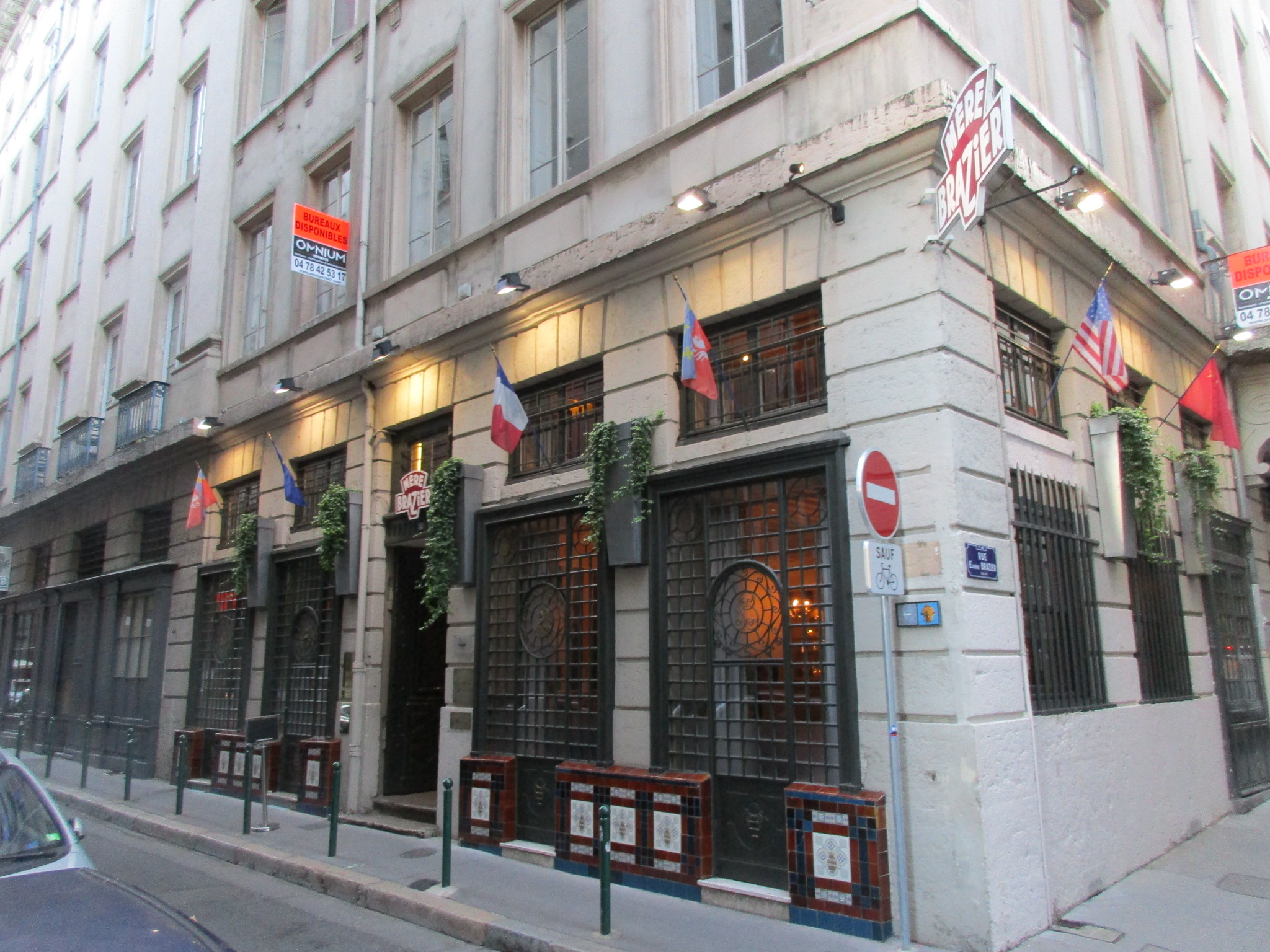
Restaurant Mère Brazier

Born Eugénie Brazier in 1895, Mère Brazier began working as a maid and then as a cook for a family around 1914 or 1916 at the age of 21. She later worked for Mère Filloux, though Filloux was "endlessly critical." In 1921 at age 26 she bought a former grocery at 12 Rue Royale and turned it into a restaurant with 15 seats which opened in 1922. Like her mentor Filloux she also specialized in poulet demi deuil. The mayor of Lyon, Édouard Herriot, was a frequent customer. She expanded her restaurant but handed it over to her son, moved to the small nearby village of Col de la Luère, and in 1932 opened another restaurant there. Michelin awarded it two stars the year it opened and three the following year, making her the first woman to hold three Michelin stars. The original restaurant was also awarded three stars that year, and Mère Brazier became the first person of either sex to hold six Michelin stars. She trained other Michelin star winners, including Paul Bocuse, who worked for her at the restaurant in Col de la Luère and also specialized in half-mourning chicken, and Bernard Pacaud. She died in 1977. The original restaurant was in 2001 still being operated by her granddaughter. According to the Independent, Mère Brazier is regarded as "the mother of modern French cooking."

Mère Bourgeois, born Marie Humbert in 1870, was hired as a cook for a wealthy family. She married Andre Bourgeois and they bought a former inn in Priay near Lyon. She was known for dishes based on local fish and game, including a lark pate and another pate known as le pâté chaud de la mère Bourgeois, which was internationally known. Herriot was a frequent customer. In 1923 the Club de Cent (Club of One Hundred), a gastronomic society, recognized her. She held three Michelin stars from 1933 until her death in 1937. The restaurant as of 2001 was still in operation.

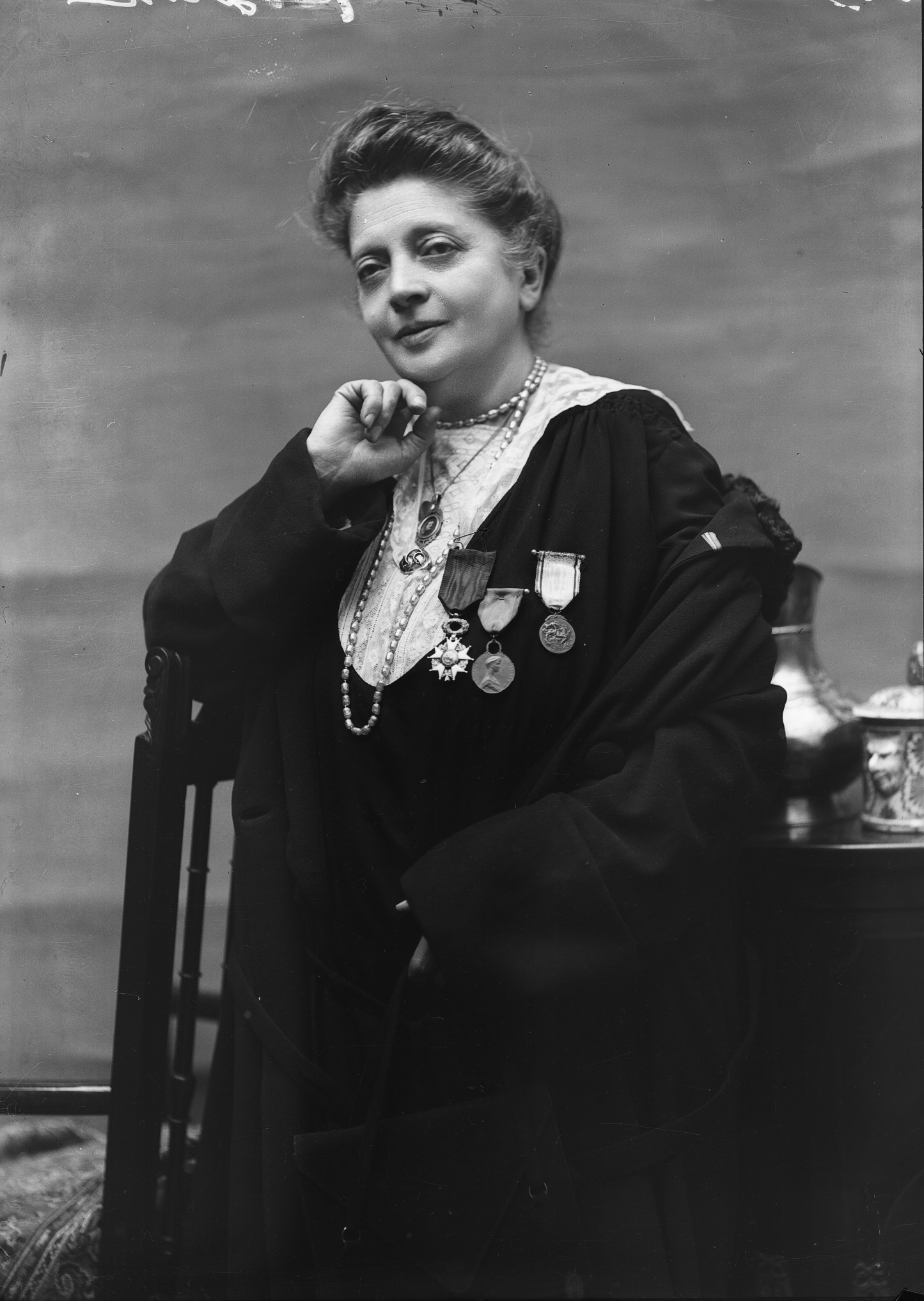
Mère Bizolon

Mère Léa Bidaut was born in Creusot in 1908 and worked during her teens for wealthy families. She was a cook at a restaurant for four years before opening La Voûte in 1943 on the Rhône in Lyon's 2nd arrondissement. Her specialty was a sauerkraut with champagne, but when other restaurants in the area started to copy it, she took it off her menu and focussed on regional specialities such as tried tripe with chervil, pike quenelles, Lyons salad, baked cardoon with bone marrow, and bugnes. Her menu was not printed and changed daily. She retired at 74 and died in 1997. As of 2001 the restaurant is still in operation.

Mère Castaing, born Paulette Penel in 1911, married Raymond Castaing in 1933 after the two met apprenticing at Hotel Cheynet in Alboussiere in Ardeche. In 1946 the couple opened Beau Rivage in Coindrieu. Her specialties included poached trout, eel stew, and pike mousseline. Mère Castaing was awarded a Michelin star in 1954 and a second in 1964; she held them until she sold the business in 1988. As of 2001 the restaurant was still in operation.

Mère Bizolon was born Marie-Joseph Clotilde Thévenet in 1871 in Coligny. She married and moved to Lyon. During World War I she set up free refreshment stations for soldiers in transit. After the war she turned her husband's shoemaking shop into a restaurant. In 1925 Herriot awarded her a Legion of Honor. In 1940 she was murdered; the crime went unsolved. After World War II a street in Lyon's 2nd arrondissement was named for her.

Other Mères de Lyon include Mère Jean, Mère Vittet, Mère Poupon, La Grande Marcelle, Mère Charles, La Mèlie, and the cheesemonger Mère Richard.

== Elsewhere ==
Mère Poulard, born Annette Boutiaut in 1851 in Nevers, started working as a maid for Édouard Corroyer and travelled with him and his family to Mont-Saint-Michel when he was commissioned to restore the Mont-Saint-Michel Abbey. She married Victor Poulard in 1873, and they opened a restaurant where she served a souffle-style omelet that became famous as the omelette de la Mère Poulard. The restaurant, now known as La Mère Poulard, as of 2020 was still in operation.

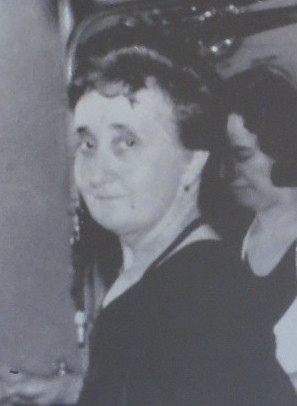
Mère Blanc

Mère Blanc, born Élisa Gervais in 1883, married Adolphe Blanc, and the couple took over his parents' restaurant in Vonnas in Bresse. Mère Blanc used many of her own mother's recipes. Her specialties included Bresse chicken, the dish that made her famous and earned her her first Michelin star. In 1930 she was given first prize in the Touring Club de France cooking competition. The restaurant was awarded a Michelin star in 1931 and two in 1932. The celebrated French food critic Curnonsky called her "the best cook in the world" in 1933. In 1934 her son and daughter-in-law took over the restaurant. She died in 1949. In 1968 her grandson Georges Blanc took over; as of 1982 it was still called La Mere Blanc and had received its third Michelin star. Currently called Restaurant Georges Blanc, as of 2020 it is still in operation with her grandson as chef.

Les Mères Allard were a mother-in-law and daughter-in-law in Paris. Marthe Meuriot married Marcel Allard in 1920, and together they opened a bistro in the 13th arrondissement. Her specialties included Burgundy stew, pot-au-feu, and jugged rabbit. They moved to Rue Saint-André-des-Arts in the 5th arrondissement and she continued to produce Burgundian dishes such as poached pike with beurre blanc, roast guinea fowl, and lamb stew. After World War II her son and his wife, Fernande, took over, and Fernande also became known as Mère Allard. Her specialties included pâté en croûte, cassoulet, veal with onions and bacon, lamb stew, lentils with salt pork, braised beef with carrots, and chicken in red wine. As of 2001 the restaurant was still in operation.

Mère Crouzier was born in Périgord and from 1945 to 1986 worked at La Croix-Blanche, one of the oldest inns in France, in Chaumont-sur-Tharonne in Sologne. The restaurant, which was owned by her husband's parents, has had female chefs throughout its history, starting in 1779. She developed her specialty, rabbit Albicocco, in 1969.

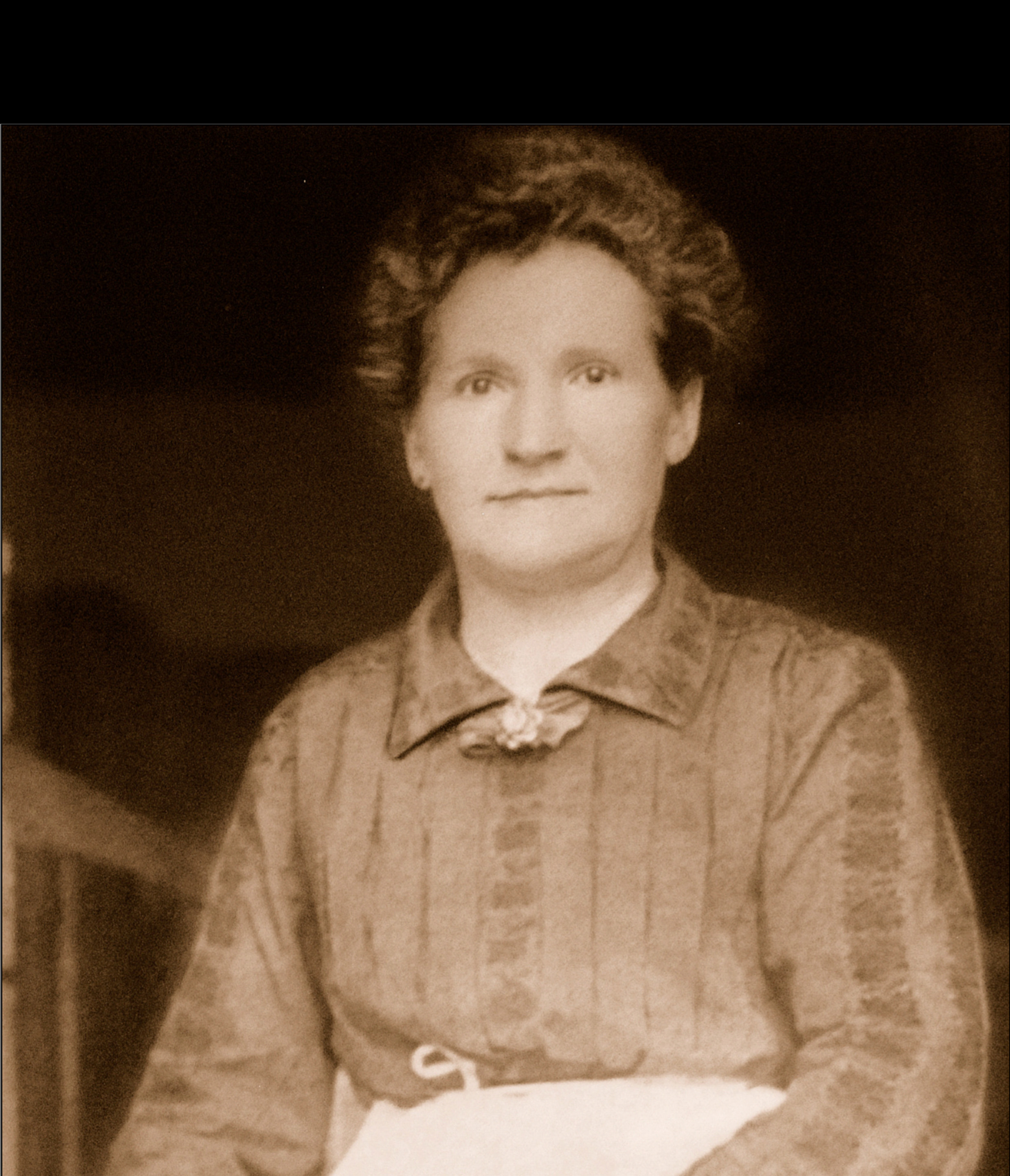
Mère Maury

Mère Adrienne Biasin, born in a small village near Parme, opened Chez la Vielle at 37 Rue de l'Arbre-Sec in Paris when she was 25 and operated it from 1958 thru 1993, initially serving mostly workers from les Halles. Jacques Maniere and Raymond Oliver were frequent customers. She became well known after Phillippe Couderc, an influential food critic, wrote about her in his column. The restaurant had only 30 seats and reservations were booked three months in advance. Her Christmas menu was published by Marie Claire in 1976 and she afterward complained about the deluge of new customers, saying "They all want only these dishes. They do not understand that food must be different every day." She had a television series for two years and wrote a column for Madame Figaro. As of 2001 the restaurant is still in operation but Mère Adrienne had retired.

Mère Barale was born in Nice in 1916. In 1933 at age 17 she took over the operation of her parents' restaurant, Chez Paulin et Ma, in the Riquier neighborhood. Her specialities were traditional Niçoise dishes including trouchia, an omelet with bay, cheese, and chard, tourta de blea, a chard pie, pissaldiera, a pizza-like onion tart, estocaficada, a tomato-based fish stew, doba a la nissarda, a beef stew served with ravioli, and socca, a crisp garbanzo-flour griddled crepe. Nice-Matin called her "the most delicious monument of Nice's heritage." As of 2001 she was still running the restaurant. Mere Maury (born Marie-Louise Gélibert in 1863 in Bourg-de-Péage), married Annet Maury in 1885. In 1894 she inherited her parents' cafe and added ravioli to the menu. She died in 1941.

== See also ==
- Les Toques Blanches Lyonnaises
