= Les Toques Blanches Lyonnaises =

Organisation of Cooks and Pastry chefs

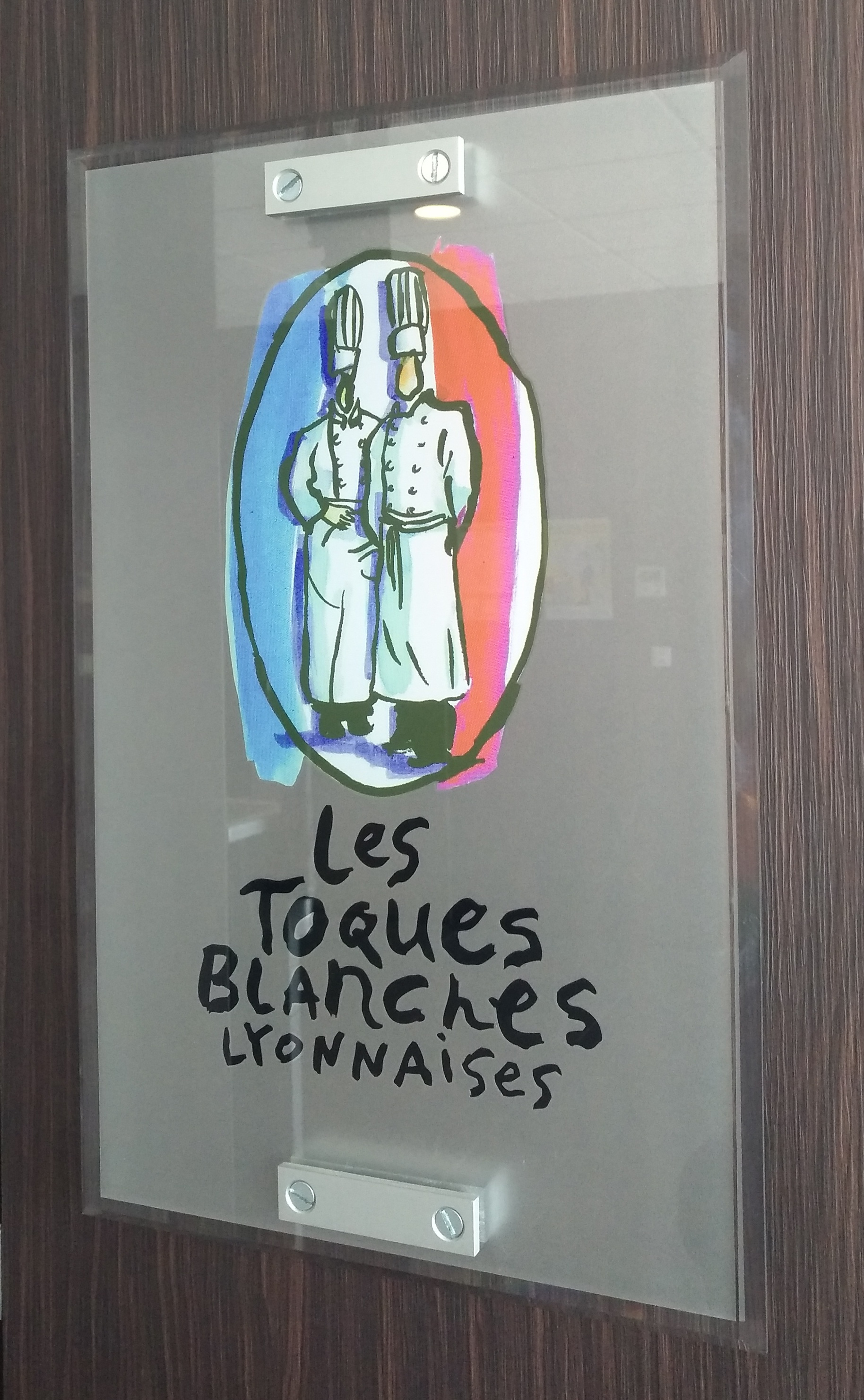
- Formation: 1936; 90 years ago
- Founder: Marius Vettard
- Location: Lyon
- Region served: Lyon
- President: Christophe Marguin
- Website: toques-blanches-lyonnaises.com

Les Toques Blanches Lyonnaises (lit. 'Lyon White Hats') is an organization that was founded in 1936 by 7 renowned chefs from the Lyon area, including the founder and first president of the organization, Marius Vettard. The organization's goals are to unite cooks and pastry chefs to preserve and maintain the culinary history and traditions of Lyon, including the mâchon, the Mères Lyonnaises, bouchons, and Lyon's Michelin-Starred restaurants. It also aims to promote Lyonnais gastronomy and regional products.

There are currently about 120 chefs who work to promote Lyon's gastronomy at local, national and international levels.

== List of presidents ==
- Marius Vettard (1936–1976)
- Paul Blanc (1976–1982)
- Roger Roucoud (1983–1987)
- Pierre Orsi (1988–1993)
- Guy Lassaussaie (1994–2006)
- Christophe Marguin (2006–2012)
- Laurent Bouvier (2012–2015)
- Christophe Marguin (Since 2015)
