= Keith Sarasin =

American author, chef

Keith Sarasin (born 1981 or 1982) is an American chef from New Hampshire who has written four books.

== Career ==
Sarasin was born in 1981 or 1982. When he was 14 years old, he worked at Red Lobster. In college, he received a degree in psychology. During his college studies, he worked at restaurants like Red Lobster as a line cook. Sarasin worked at Boston restaurants including as an executive chef before returning to Nashua, New Hampshire. In 2012, Sarasin started The Farmers Dinner.

Sarasin's four books are The Perfect Turkey, The Farmers Dinner Cookbook, Meat: The Ultimate Cookbook and Jerky: The Essential Cookbook. In a review of The Perfect Turkey, Susan Lauglin of the magazine New Hampshire called it "the consummate guide to Thanksgiving dinner" and said, "The book is great for beginners, but also gives insight to seasoned veterans of the Thanksgiving table."
