= Bernard Arcand =

Canadian anthropologist and writer (1945–2009)

Bernard Arcand (April 18, 1945 – January 30, 2009) was a French-Canadian anthropologist, author and communicator. He was for several decades a professor of the anthropology department of Laval University.

Born in Deschambault, Québec, he was film director Denys Arcand and actor Gabriel Arcand's brother. He studied social sciences at the Université de Montréal (baccalaureate, 1965; master, 1966). While still in university, he had an acting role in the short film Geneviève.

He later studied at the University of Cambridge where he obtained a certificate (1967) and a doctorate (1972), in social anthropology. He taught at Copenhagen University in 1971, and then as an assistant professor at McGill University between 1972 and 1976. He was assistant and then tenured professor at Université Laval from 1976 to 2006.

He was a member of the editorial board of the journal Anthropologie et Sociétés between 1982 and 1987, and president of the Société canadienne d'anthropologie from 1989 to 1991.

In 1991, Arcand published Le Jaguar et le Tamanoir (The Jaguar and the Anteater), a series of essays on the topic of pornography for which he received the Governor General's Award for French-language non-fiction. In collaboration with Serge Bouchard, he hosted a radio show called The Commonplace, broadcast on Radio-Canada in 1990. Some texts and extracts of these shows were published between 1993 and 2003.

Arcand and Bouchard wrote a humor column entitled "Bien vu!", in the journal Science Quebec.

His work with the Cuiva in Colombia was documented in the film, Last of the Cuiva (Disappearing World series of anthropological films, 1971).
