= Serge Bouchard =

Canadian anthropologist (1947–2021)

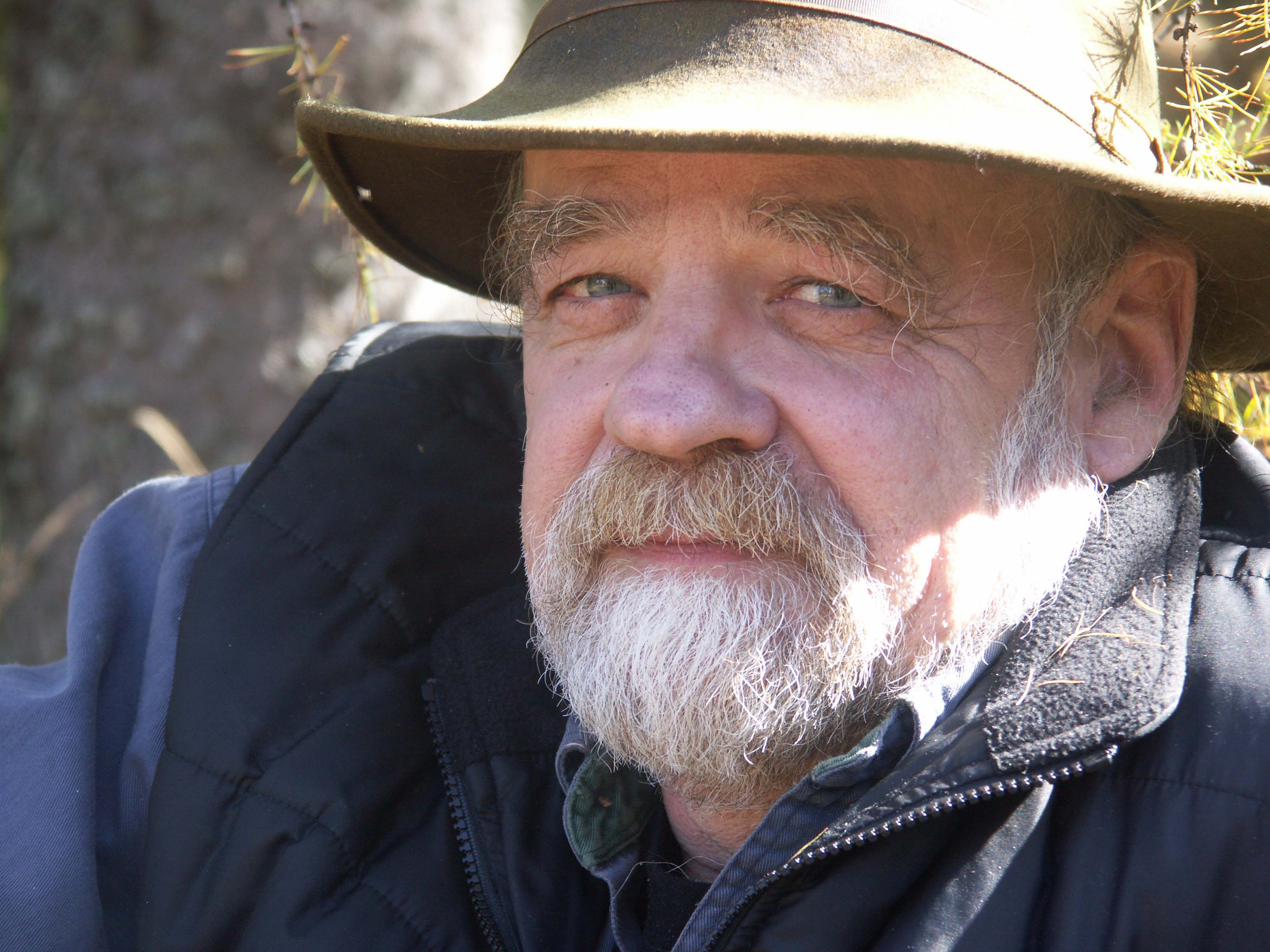
- Born: July 27, 1947; Montreal, Quebec
- Died: May 11, 2021 (aged 73); Montreal, Quebec
- Education: McGill University, Université Laval
- Occupations: anthropologist, writer, broadcaster
- Spouse: Marie-Christine Lévesque
- Writing career
- Language: French
- Period: 1970s–2021
- Notable work: Les Yeux tristes de mon camion

Serge Bouchard (July 27, 1947 – May 11, 2021) was a Canadian anthropologist, writer, and media personality. Bouchard studied contemporary life in Canada from an anthropological perspective; his subjects ranged from Innu hunters to Quebec truck drivers. Through his frequent appearances in the media, Bouchard's commentary reached both a popular and scholarly audience. He received the Prix Gérard-Morrisset in 2015 and a Governor-General's Award in 2017.

== Early life and education ==
Bouchard was born on July 27, 1947, in Montreal, Quebec, Canada. He attended the Collège Mont-Saint-Louis in Montreal alongside sports commentator Claude Mailhot and politician Gilles Duceppe, both of whom remained life-long friends of Bouchard's.

Bouchard obtained a Master's degree from Université Laval in 1973, with a dissertation focused on hunters of the Innu people in Labrador. He then went on to study for a doctorate at McGill University, which he completed in 1980, his research and thesis focusing on the lives and culture of long-distance truck drivers in north-west Quebec. His interest in this subject arose as a result of his father and grandfather having been truck drivers, and Bouchard spent time travelling around the province with drivers, as part of his research. His doctoral thesis was supervised by Bernard Arcand, with whom he became a collaborator and close friend.

== Career ==
Bouchard's first publication was Chronique de chasse d'un Montagnais de Mingan (Hunting Stories by a Montagnais Indian from Mingan), a translation of a memoir by 91-year-old former hunter and trapper Mathieu Mestokosho, which he published in 1977. The Innu (formerly Montagnais) man had written the work as part of Quebec Heritage Week under the Ministry of Cultural Affairs.

After completing his studies at McGill, Bouchard worked in a number of roles including intercultural communication and the study of ethnohistory and workers' culture. He then went on to head the human sciences research programme at the Institut de recherche en santé et en sécurité du travail, a role he held between 1987 and 1990. From 1990 to 1996 he worked for the French Army, with a job title of consultant en management et organisation du travail (consultant in management and organisation of work).

In 1991, Bouchard published Le moineau domestique, a collection of around 60 essays on the struggles and joys of modern life. John Ellis Hare of the Ottawa Citizen said that "there are many smiles and chuckles in Bouchard's dry humour" and called the pieces "gems of wisdom and experience".

Bouchard first appeared on a Radio-Canada television program in 1981. In the 2000s, he was featured on Radio-Canada's show Indicatif présent alongside Jean-Daniel Lafond where they would discuss social issues and current affairs. He also hosted Radio-Canada shows Les Lieux Communs (The Common Places) with Bernard Arcand, and Les chemins de travers by himself. Bouchard has been consulted on or featured in several films, including Québékoisie and Hochelaga, Land of Souls.

In 2021, Bouchard released a collection of around 70 essays titled Un café avec Marie. The work was named after his wife, Marie-Christine Lévesque, who had died from brain cancer on July 16, 2020.

He had an enduring interest in the Indigenous peoples of Canada, the Canadian North, and the French-speaking peoples of North America. Throughout his career, he travelled to spend time in Quebec's Côte-Nord, Nunavik and Baie-James areas, as well as Labrador and the Yukon territory, studying the peoples of those regions.

Bouchard received the Prix Gérard-Morisset in 2015. He won the Governor General's Award for French-language non-fiction twice, at the 2017 Governor General's Awards for Les Yeux tristes de mon camion and at the 2021 Governor General's Awards for Du diesel dans les veines.

== Death ==
In April 2021, while still working as a host of the show C'est fou... with Jean-Philippe Pleau on the Canadian Broadcasting Corporation's Ici Radio-Canada Première network, Bouchard announced on Facebook that he was taking some time off due to "little health issues". He posted again, on May 9, saying "I slowly regain my mammoth strength, and I'm anxious to be back in front of a microphone and the listeners".

He died on May 10, 2021, at the age of 73.

== Works ==
- Chroniques de chasse d'un Montagnais de Mingan (1977)
- Le moineau domestique: histoire de vivre (1991)
- Quinze lieux communs (1993, with Bernard Arcand)
- De nouveaux lieux communs (1994, with Bernard Arcand)
- Du pâté chinois, du baseball et autres lieux communs (1995, with Bernard Arcand)
- De la fin du mâle, de l'emballage et autres lieux communs (1996, with Bernard Arcand)
- Des pompiers, de l'accent français et autres lieux communs (1998, with Bernard Arcand)
- France-Québec: images et mirages (1999)
- L'homme descend de l'ourse (1998)
- Du pipi, du gaspillage et sept autres lieux communs (2001, with Bernard Arcand)
- Cow-boy dans l'âme: sur la piste du Western et du country (2002, with Bernard Arcand)
- Les Meilleurs Lieux communs, peut-être (2003, with Bernard Arcand)
- Les corneilles ne sont pas les épouses des corbeaux (2005)
- Caribou Hunter: A Song of a Vanished Innu Life (2006, with Mathieu Mestokosho)
- Bestiaire: confessions animales (2006)
- Bestiaire II: confessions animales (2008)
- Elles ont fait l'Amérique: De remarquables oubliés, Tome 1 (2011, with Marie-Christine Lévesque)
- C'était au temps des mammouths laineux (2012)
- Ils ont couru l'Amérique: De remarquables oubliés, Tome 2 (2014, with Marie-Christine Lévesque)
- Les Yeux tristes de mon camion (2016)
- Le peuple rieur: hommage à mes amis Innus (2017, with Marie-Christine Lévesque)
- L'Œuvre du grand lièvre filou (2018)
- L'Allume-cigarette de la Chrysler noire (2019)
- Un café avec Marie (2021)
- Du diesel dans les veines: La saga des camionneurs du Nord (2021, with Mark Fortier)
