= Crayfish as food =

Small crustaceans in human cuisines

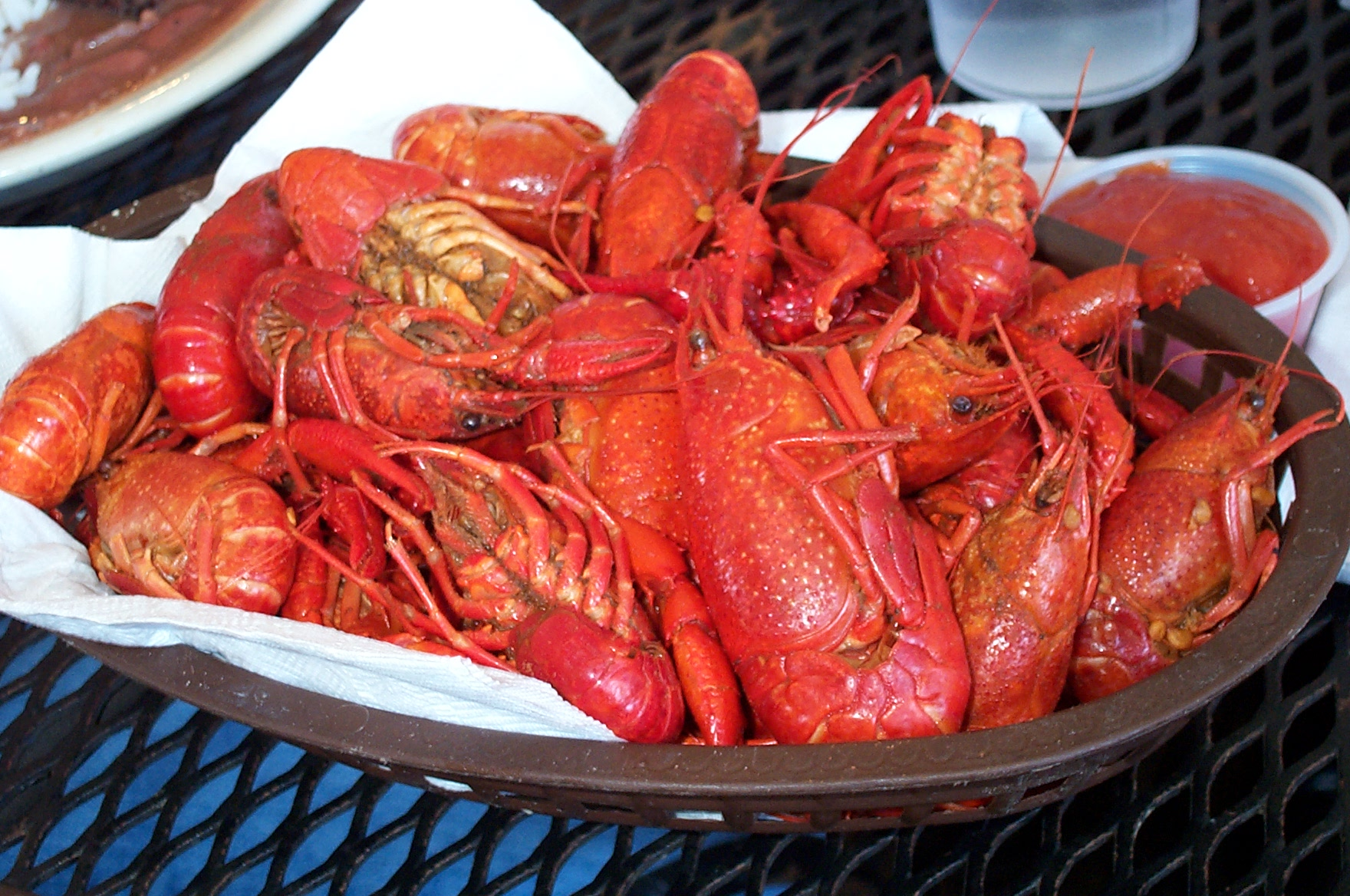
- Main ingredients: Crayfish

Crayfish are eaten all over the world. Like other edible large crustaceans, like lobsters, only a portion of the body of a crayfish is eaten. In most prepared dishes, such as soups, bisques and étouffées, only the tail section is served. At crawfish boils or other meals where the entire body of the crayfish is presented, other parts, such as the claw meat, may be eaten.

Claws of larger boiled crayfish are often pulled apart to access the meat, as seasoning and flavor can collect in the fat of the boiled interior.

== Regional cuisines ==
=== Australia ===
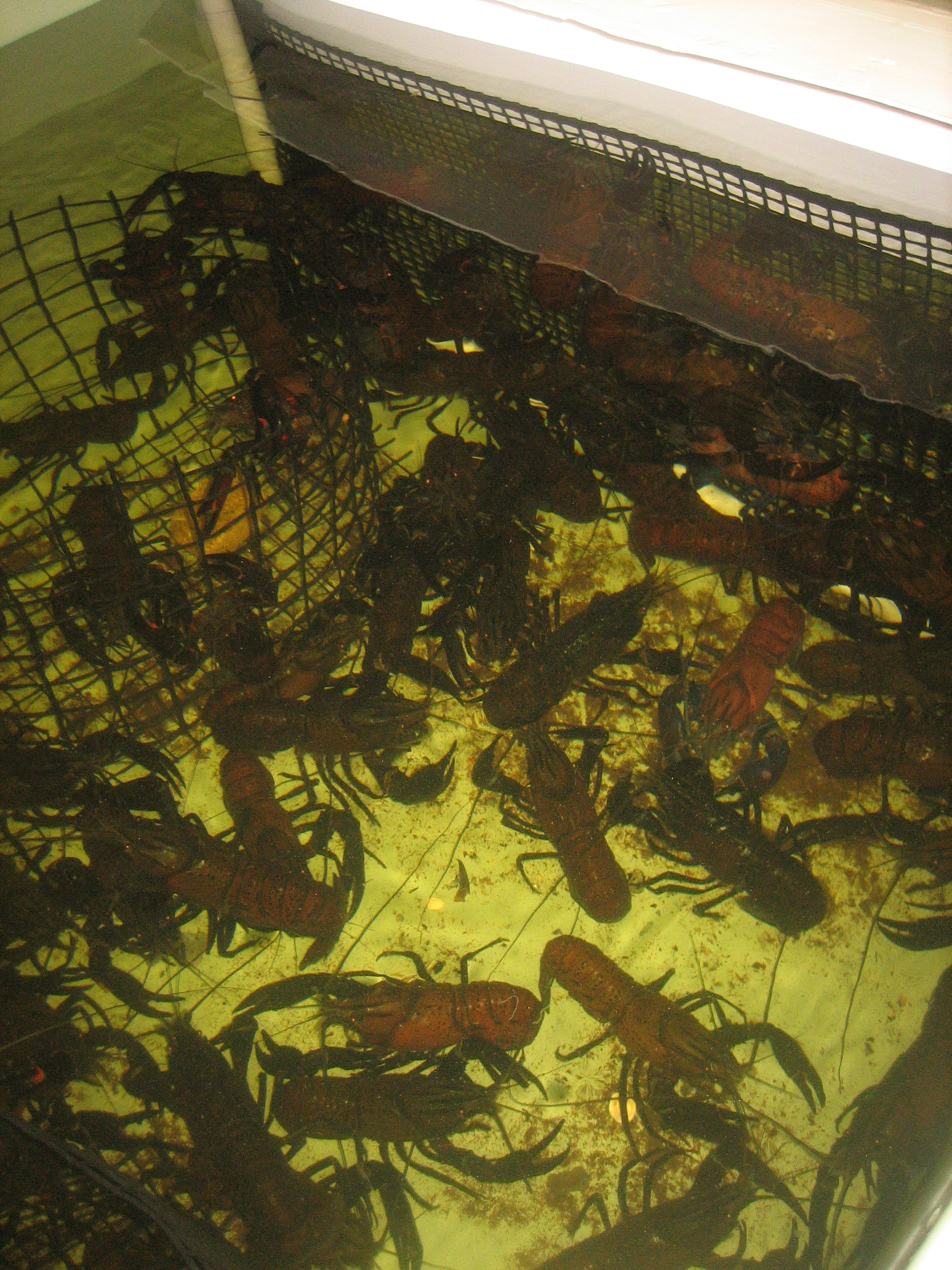
Farmed marron (Cherax cainii) on Kangaroo Island

Australia is home to genus Cherax which is distinct from European, Asian and North and South American species. Two of the Australian edible crayfish are the common yabby (C. destructor) and the red claw (C. quadricarinatus). The common yabby is closest in size to the North American species, but is not considered to be commercially viable outside Australia because of its relatively slow growth and small size. The "red claw" crayfish are twice the size of North American crayfish and they contain 30% edible "meat" compared to 15% for P. clarkii. Other Australian species are fairly rare and thus usually are not used for food. Their slow growth generally makes them inefficient for aquaculture.

=== China ===
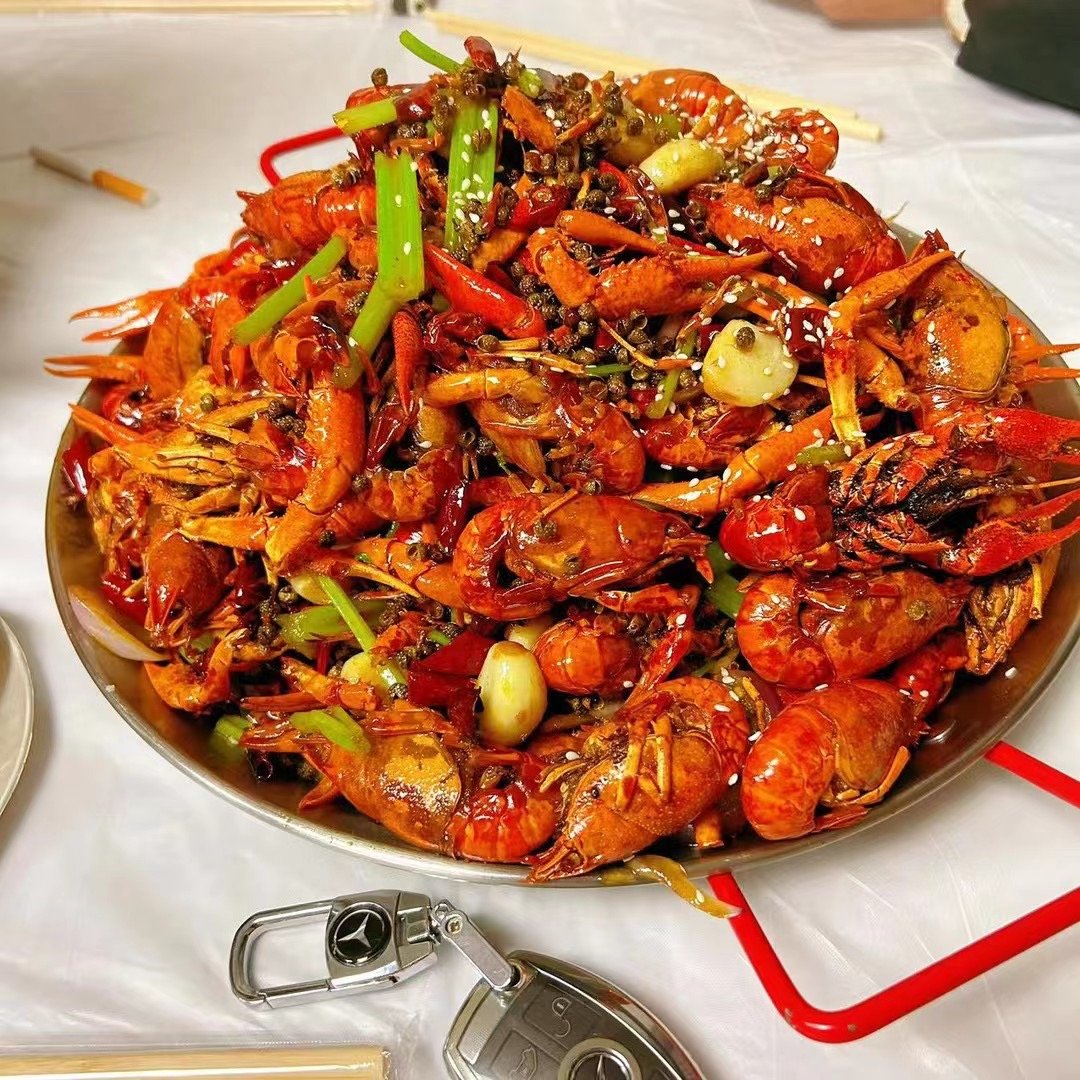
A crayfish dish from Jinhu County

Chinese crayfish consumption changed from a mainly locally caught and cooked dish as China became more affluent and more restaurants opened. Since the mid 1990s, China's consumption has rocketed and now is the world's largest producer and consumer of crayfish, many of the farmed crayfish are red swamp crayfish. The red swamp crayfish was introduced to China in the 1930s, likely from Japan. It is an invasive species and if farmed crayfish escape and become established, they can and have caused significant ecosystem changes. Non farmed fishing exists in most rivers and large areas of water, from ponds to lakes and rivers in nearly every city, town and village in central and southern China and beyond. In some regions like Yunnan crayfish can be found in some paddies in such numbers as to be a nuisance to the rice farmers.

Several varieties of crayfish are commonly eaten although most of the native varieties can be both regional and seasonal. Crayfish are prepared in a variety of different ways in different regions, with possibly the most popular way for home cooking being "ma la xiao long xia" a hot spicy soup with chunks of cucumber and Sichuan pepper corns. Whilst restaurants often offer more varied spicy dishes (a combined flavor of Sichuan pepper and hot chili) stir-fried with other ingredients, they are also stir-fried with minced garlic or salted egg yolk for those who can't eat spicy food, steamed whole for those who prefer lighter flavors, or put in Huadiao jiu (sometimes using other type Huangjiu, or even more wines) for 5–8 hours after steaming. Crayfish soaked in wine are more common in the East region, and are often referred to as "bing zui" (冰醉, which means ice-drunken).

=== France ===
In France, dishes with a base or garnish of crayfish (écrevisse) are frequently described as à la Nantuaise (in the style of Nantua).

Crayfish tails and butter are also used to flavor the Nantua sauce commonly served with quenelles. Crayfish and fried eggs are the historically common garnish for chicken Marengo, although they are often omitted today.

=== Madagascar ===
An invasive species, the Marbled crayfish are eaten in Madagascar. This species is parthenogenic where the eggs hatch without fertilisation, meaning that they are all clones of each other. Human interest in consuming them may have helped them to spread 100-fold from 2007 to 2017.

=== Mexico ===
The Mexican crayfish locally named acocil was a very important nutrition source of the ancient Mexican Aztec culture. Other regional names for crayfish are chacales, chacalines and langostinos. Today, crayfish is consumed mainly boiled, similarly to crayfish dishes in other parts of the world, or prepared with typically Mexican sauces and condiments, particularly in central and southern Mexico. Traditional preparations include soups, tacos and "cocktails" similar to shrimp dishes.

=== Nigeria ===
In Nigeria, what is commonly referred to as "crayfish" are actually small dried shrimp or prawns, not true freshwater crayfish. These are a staple ingredient in Nigerian cuisine, usually smoked or sun-dried, and form an indispensable food item in the diet across the southern states and Nigeria as a whole. They are a core component of many Nigerian dishes. While true crayfish are not native to Nigerian waters, these dried shrimp/prawns are widely used and are a significant source of flavor and nutrients in local cooking.

=== Nordic countries ===
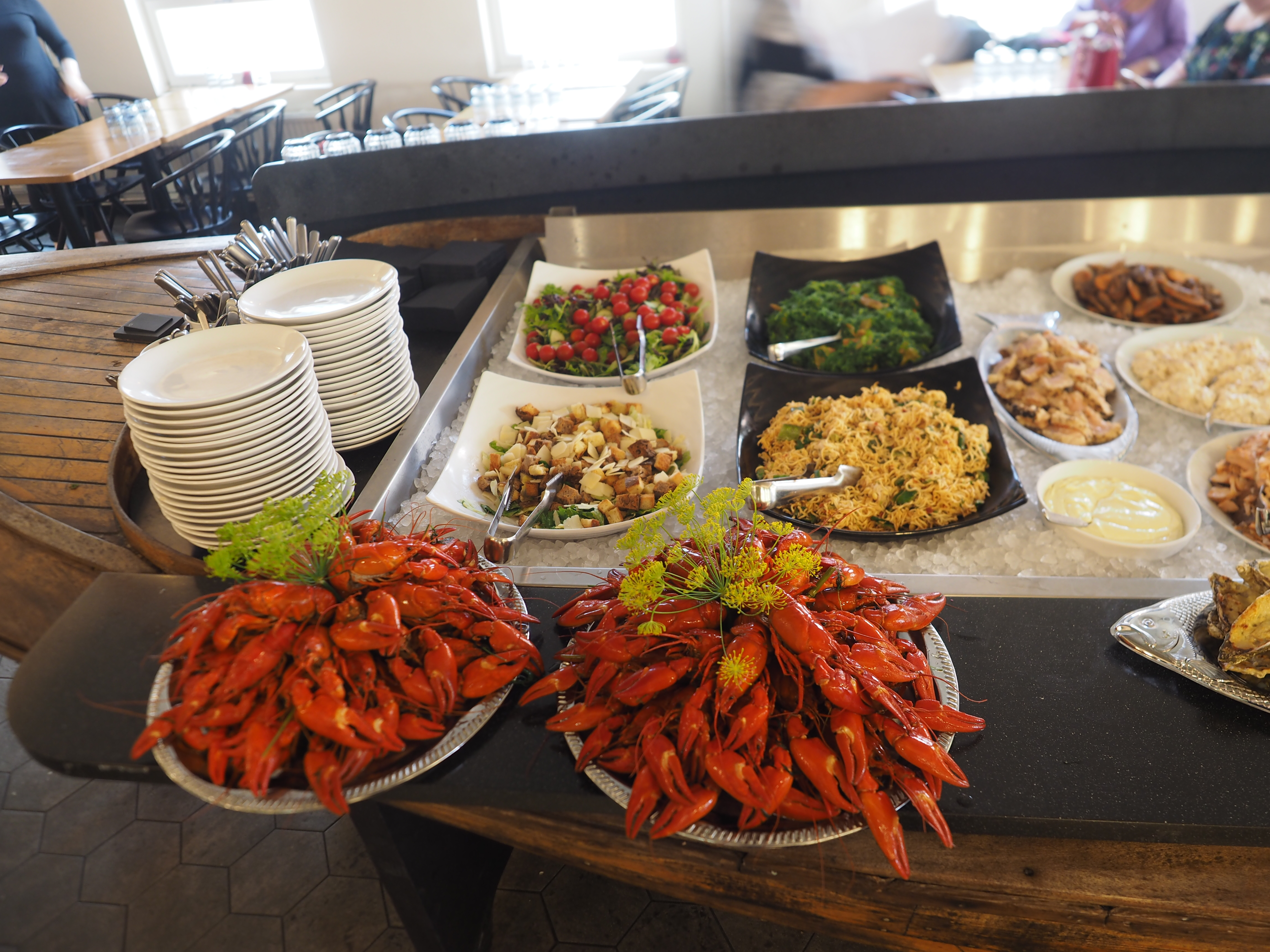
A crayfish buffet at restaurant Tukkutorin kala in Kalasatama, Helsinki, Finland

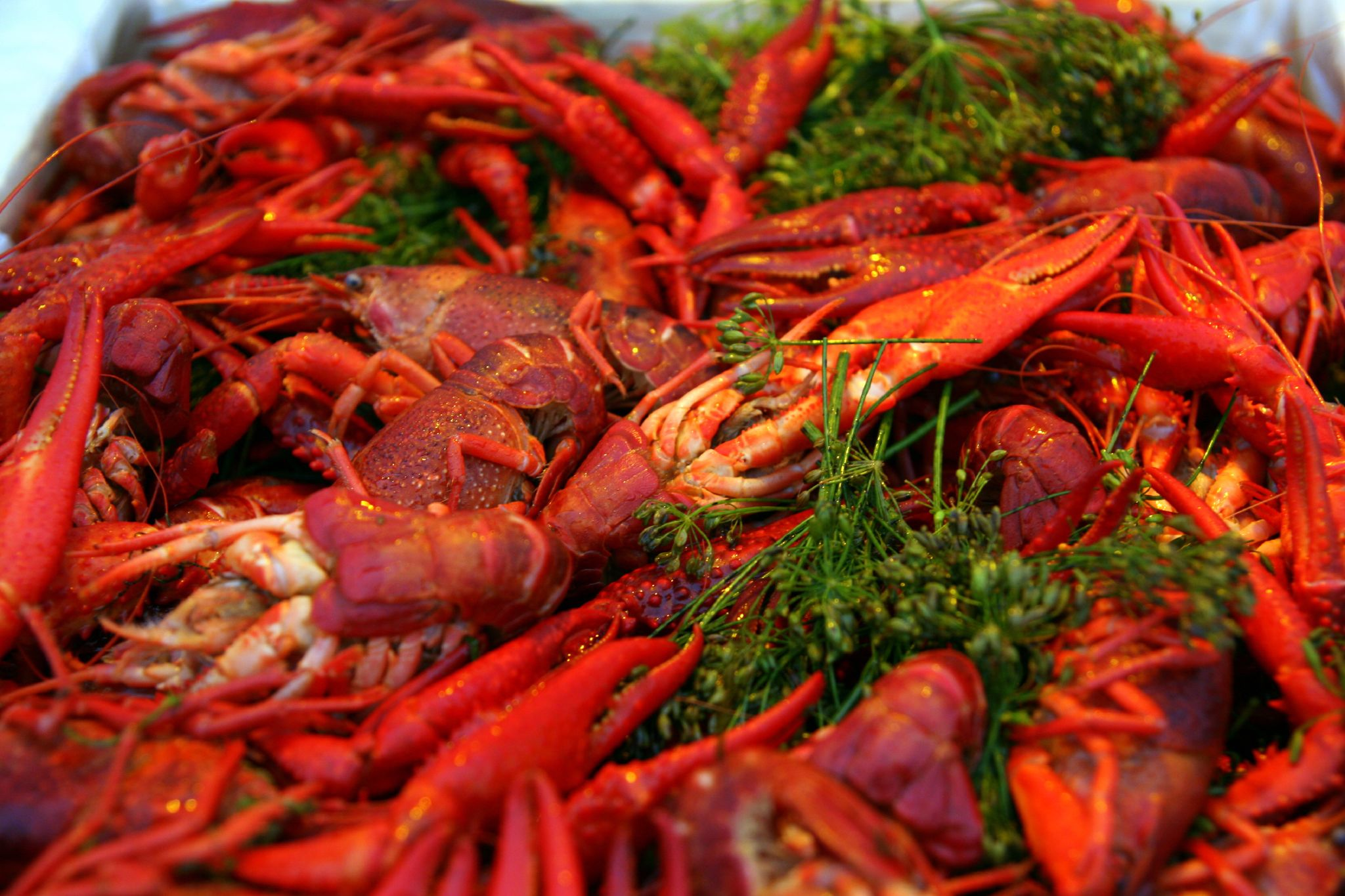
Crayfish served with dill

Crayfish is a popular dish in Sweden and Finland, and is by tradition primarily consumed at a crayfish party, called kräftskiva, during the fishing season in August. The boil is typically flavored with salt, sugar, ale, and large quantities of stems and flowers of the dill plant. While most Americans eat them warm, the Swedes and Finns normally eat them cold after letting them sit in a brine overnight. One traditional Swedish and Finnish practice is to eat crayfish with a vodka or akvavit chaser. Most crayfish in Sweden are fished by professional fishermen or by lakeside property owners. The only lake where crayfish fishing is not limited to professionals and landowners is in Lake Vättern. The catch of domestic freshwater crayfish, Astacus astacus, and even of a transplanted American species, Pacifastacus leniusculus, is very limited, and to satisfy demand, the majority of what is consumed has to be imported.

=== Russia and Ukraine ===
In Russia and Ukraine, crayfish (раки, sing. рак) are a traditional seasonal appetizer that is used as an accompaniment to beer and liquor. Although native varieties tend to be larger (usually, Astacus astacus), rampant freshwater pollution and years of overfishing largely limit availability to imports—most from Armenia, Kazakhstan and China. Prior to cooking, the crustaceans are soaked in water or milk, then boiled live for 7–15 minutes in rapidly boiling salted water with additional ingredients, such as carrots, onion, dill, parsley, bay leaf, peppercorns. More extravagant preparations include such ingredients as white wine, beer, sour cream, cloves, caraway seed, coriander seed, chili peppers, stinging nettle, etc. Russians rarely incorporate crayfish into complex dishes and, unlike other cultures, they usually consume the entire crayfish, short of the shell and the antennae. Russian and Ukrainian fascination with crayfish goes back quite far and generates considerable lore. An old proverb: "When there is no fish, even crayfish is a fish." There are as many myths associated with picking the freshest live crayfish as there are for picking ripe watermelons. Russians and Ukrainians, generally, will not cook fresh crayfish if the crustaceans are dead or perceptibly lethargic. (But pre-boiled frozen specimens are acceptable.)

=== Spain ===
In Spain, crayfish is called cangrejo de río (lit. "river crab"). They used to be widely consumed, especially in Castile and León and Aragon, but over-fishing and the introduction of non-native crayfish species (e.g. Procambarus clarkii, commonly called cangrejo americano) led to a dramatic decline in crayfish population. Nowadays they remain as a seasonal delicacy, usually stewed in tomato sauce, although fishing the native crayfish is strictly forbidden since the species is nearly extinct. Instead of the native crayfish, it is common to fish Procambarus clarkii or Pacifastacus leniusculus, also present in most of the Spanish rivers.

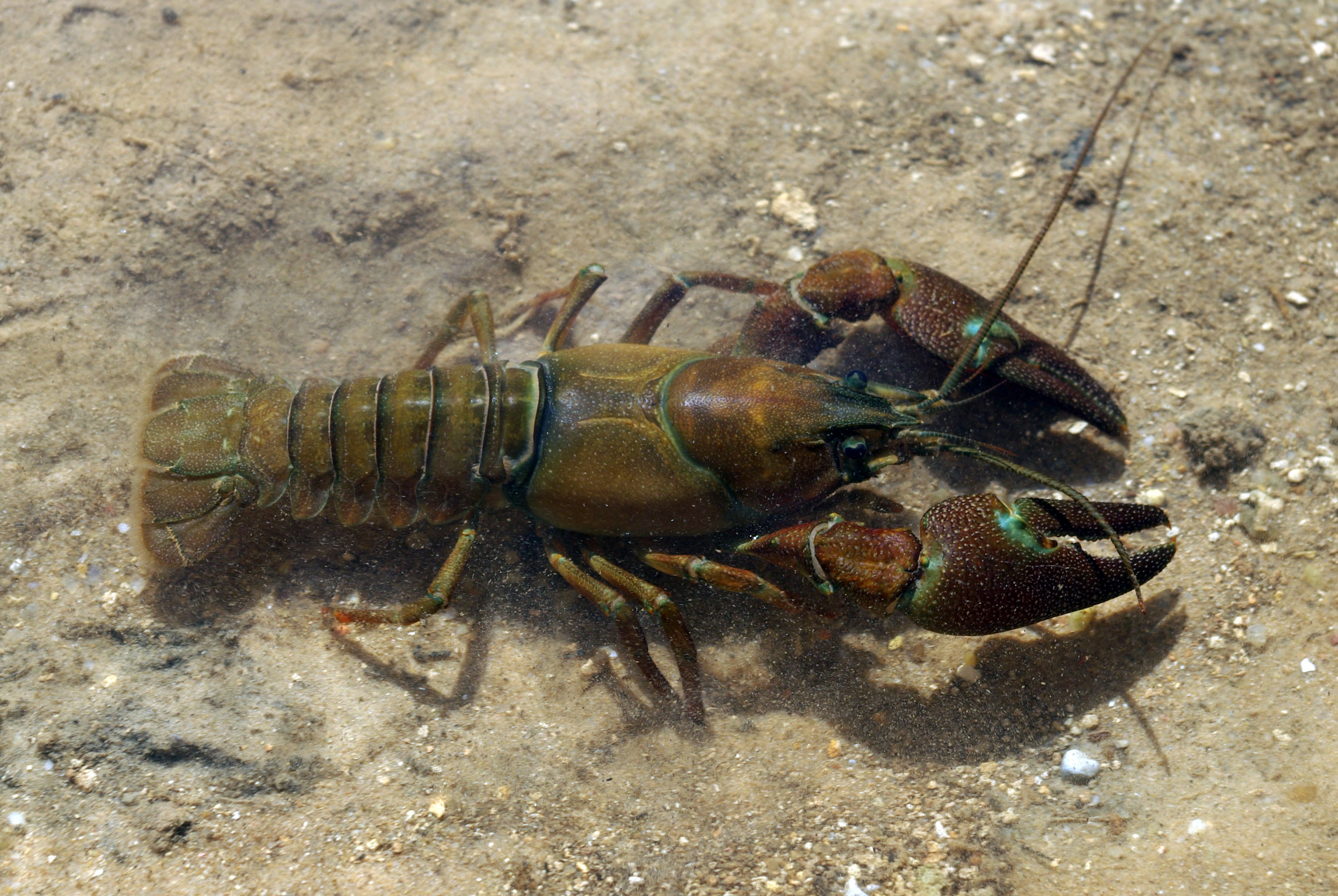
Pacifastacus leniusculus signal crayfish, an invasive North American species in British rivers and streams

=== United Kingdom ===
In the United Kingdom — escapees from 1960s fish farms that have introduced the crayfish plague, displacing the native species Astacus astacus, the broad-fingered or noble crayfish — the invasive species of North American Pacifastacus leniusculus, signal crayfish are caught and made into a soup with white wine, bay leaves, dill and parsley, prepared as part of a fish pie or exported around Europe for food.

=== United States ===
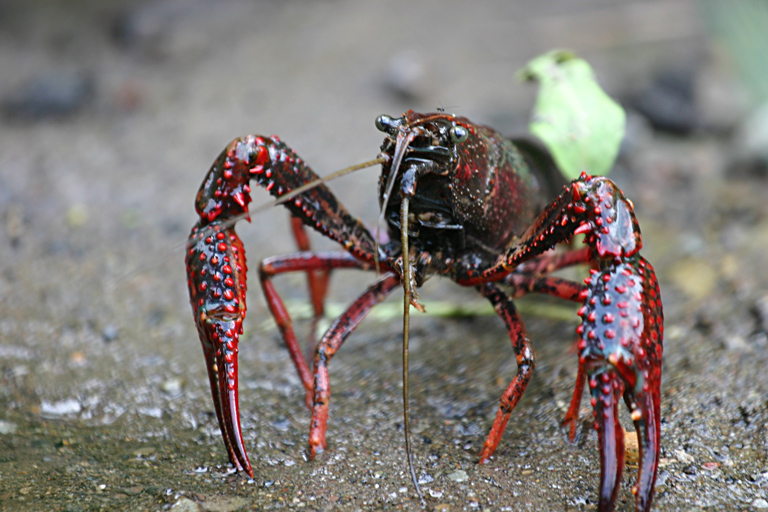
Procambarus clarkii, red swamp crayfish or Louisiana crawfish

In the United States, crayfish are often referred to as crawfish, crawdads, crawdaddies, fiddlers, or mudbugs. As of 2018, 93% of crawfish farms in the US were located in Louisiana. In 1987, Louisiana produced 90% of the crayfish harvested in the world, 70% of which were consumed locally. In 2007, the Louisiana crayfish harvest was about 54,800 tons, almost all of it from aquaculture. About 70%–80% of crayfish produced in Louisiana are Procambarus clarkii (red swamp crawfish), with the remaining 20%–30% being Procambarus zonangulus (white river crawfish). Despite the large-scale production in Louisiana, most frozen crayfish available in supermarkets in other states are Chinese imports. As early as 2003, Asian farms and fisheries produced more red swamp crayfish (P. clarkii) than the Americas, and this trend accelerated in subsequent years. By 2018, P. clarkii crawfish production in the Americas represented just 4% of total global P. clarkii supply, with Asian production accounting for the rest.

In Louisiana, Mississippi, Alabama and Southeast Texas, crayfish are generally served at a gathering known as a crawfish boil. The crayfish are usually boiled live in a large pot with heavy seasoning (salt, cayenne pepper, lemon, garlic, bay leaves, etc.) and other items such as potatoes, corn on the cob, onions, garlic, mushrooms, turkey necks, and sausage. There are many differing methods used to season a crawfish boil, and a wide variety of opinions on which one is best. Other popular dishes in the Cajun and Creole cuisines of Louisiana include crawfish étouffée, fried crawfish, crawfish pie, crawfish dressing, crawfish bread, crawfish bisque and crawfish beignets.

In Houston, Texas, a regional style of Vietnamese-Cajun crawfish has developed.

The Cherokee have a long tradition of catching crawdads by gigging. The crawdads are cleaned, then soaked, "in hot water with about one tablespoon of salt." The crawdads are lightly breaded with cornmeal before frying, and seasoned with salt and pepper.

== Religions ==
=== Judaism ===
Like all crustaceans, crawfish are not kosher because they are aquatic animals that have neither fins nor scales. They are therefore not eaten by observant Jews.

== Boiling alive ==
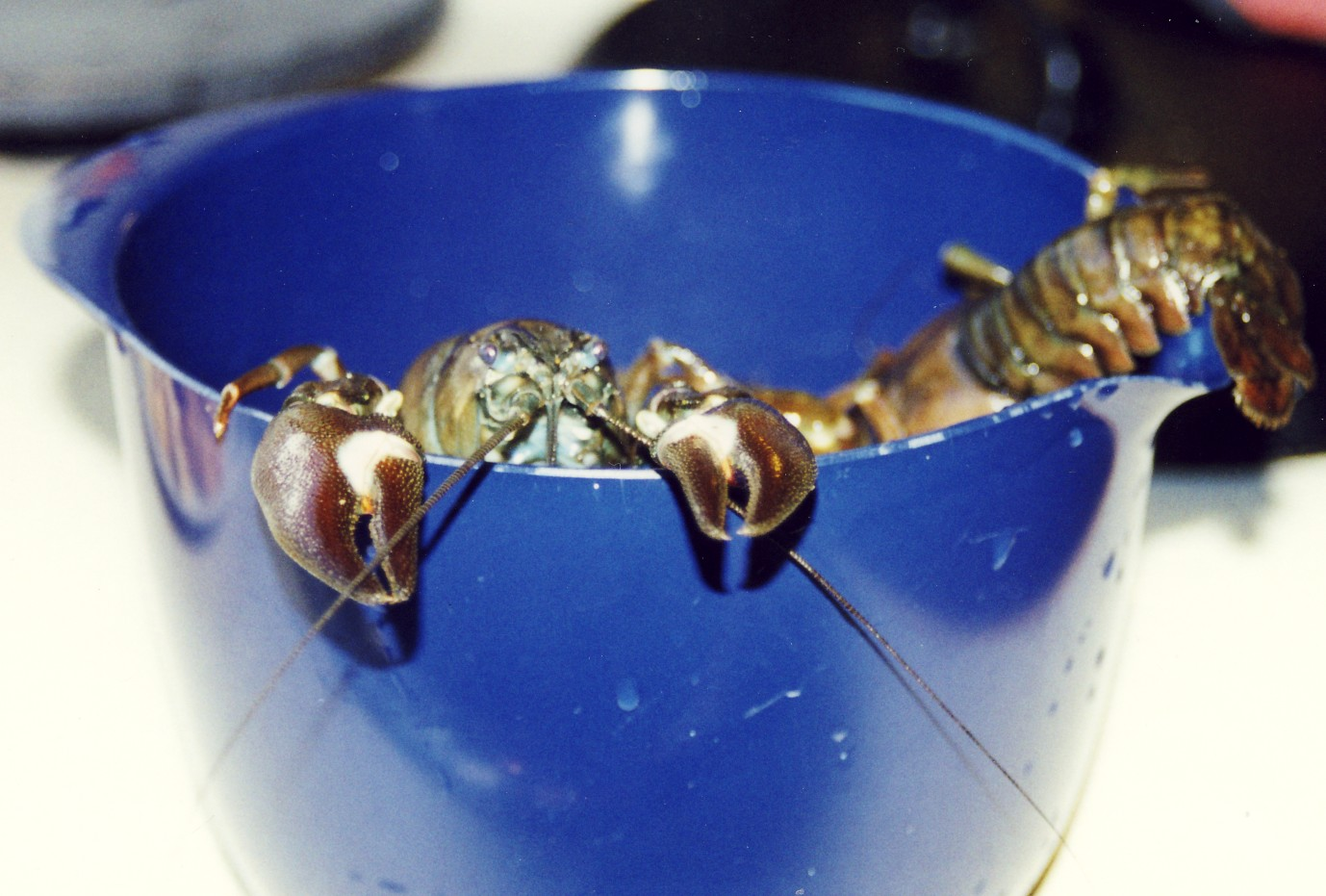
Live crayfish

== See also ==
- Lobster
- Pain in crustaceans
