= Gefilte fish =

Ashkenazi Jewish dish made from ground fish

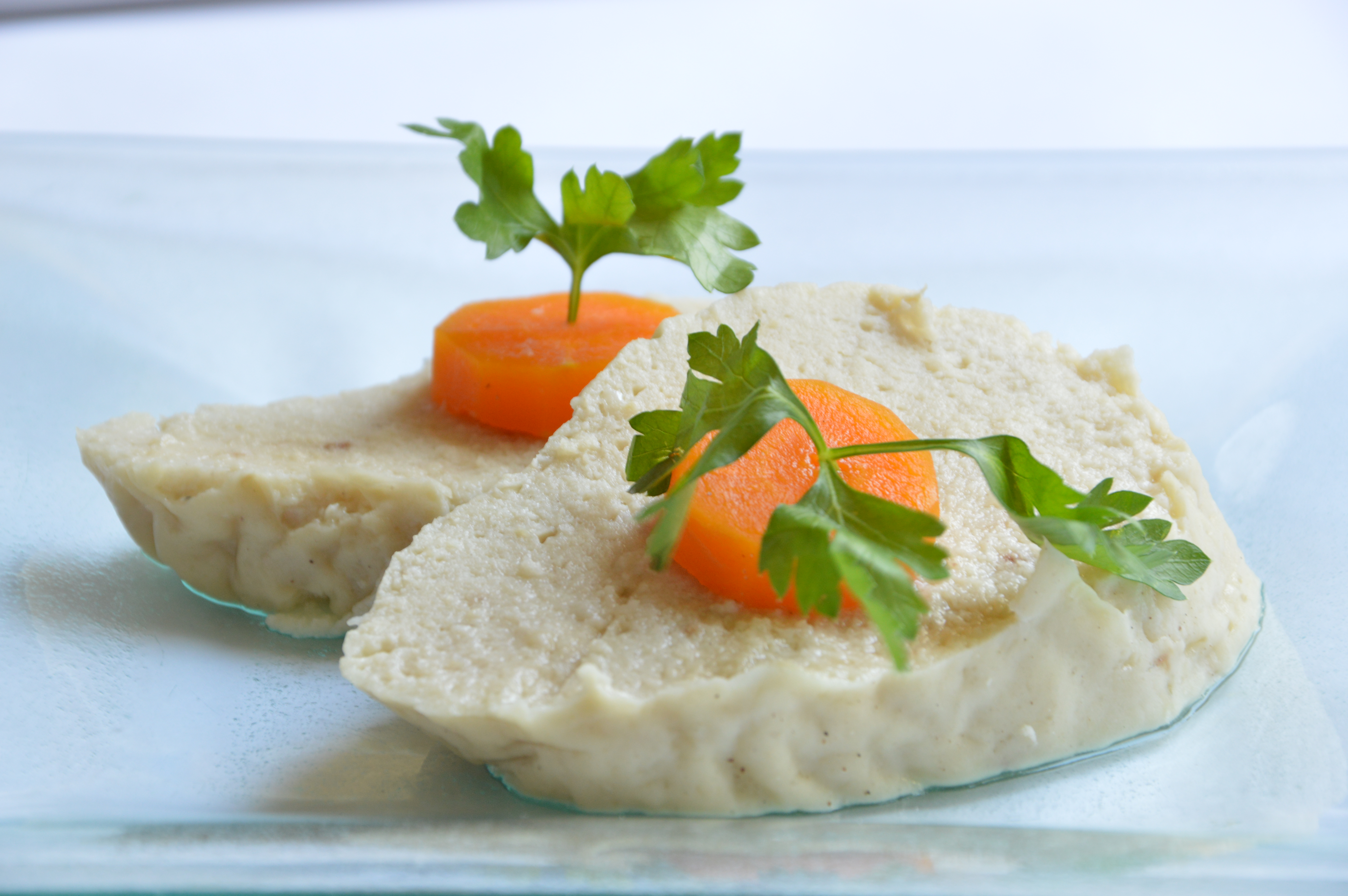
- Gefilte fish topped with thin slices of carrot
- Course: Hors d'oeuvre
- Region or state: Central and Eastern Europe, United States, Israel, Canada, Argentina
- Created by: Ashkenazi Jewish communities
- Main ingredients: Ground fish, matzo meal (sometimes), eggs (sometimes)

Gefilte fish (/ɡəˈfɪltə fɪʃ/; from Yiddish: געפֿילטע פֿיש, German: Gefüllter Fisch / Gefüllte Fische, lit. "stuffed fish") is a dish made from a poached mixture of ground deboned fish, such as carp, whitefish, or pike. It is traditionally served as an appetizer by Ashkenazi Jewish households. Popular on Shabbat and Jewish holidays such as Passover, it may be consumed throughout the year. It is typically garnished with a slice of cooked carrot on top.

Historically, gefilte fish was a stuffed whole fish consisting of minced-fish forcemeat stuffed inside the intact fish skin. By the 16th century, cooks had started omitting the labor-intensive stuffing step, and the seasoned fish was most commonly formed into patties similar to quenelles or fish balls.

In Poland, gefilte fish is referred to as karp po żydowsku ("carp Jewish-style").

== Origins ==
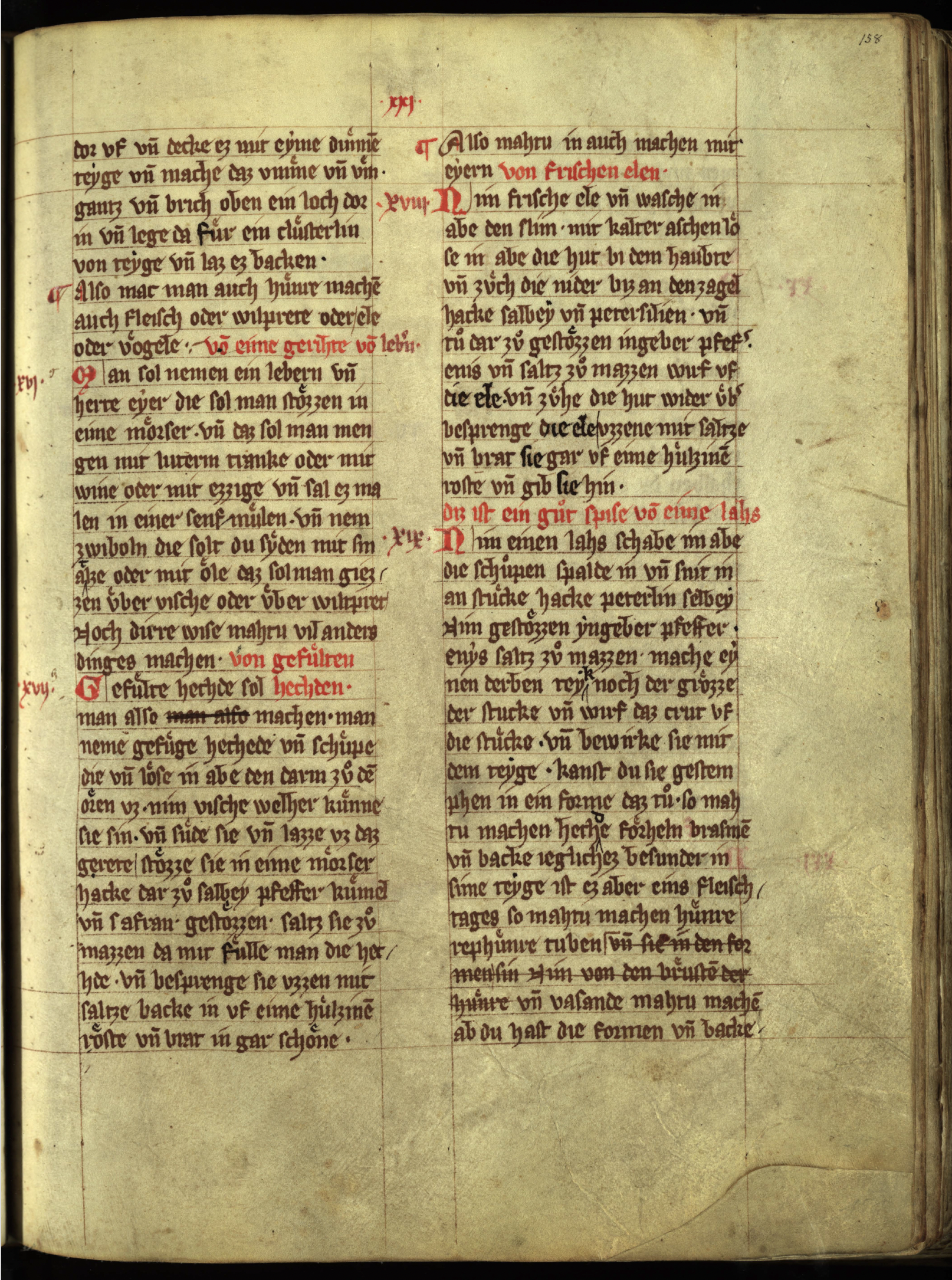
Original Gefilte fish recipe from a 1350 Bavarian cookbook

Gefilte fish likely originated in non-Jewish, German cooking. The earliest historical reference to gefuelten hechden (stuffed pikes) comes from Daz Buoch von Guoter Spise (The Book of Good Food), a Middle High German cookbook dating to circa 1350 CE. Gefuelten hechden consisted of poached and mashed pike that was flavored with herbs and seeds, stuffed back inside the fish skin, and then roasted. This dish was popular with German Catholics during Lent, when it is forbidden to eat meat. By the Middle Ages, stuffed fish had migrated into the cuisine of German and Eastern European Jews.

== Preparation and serving ==
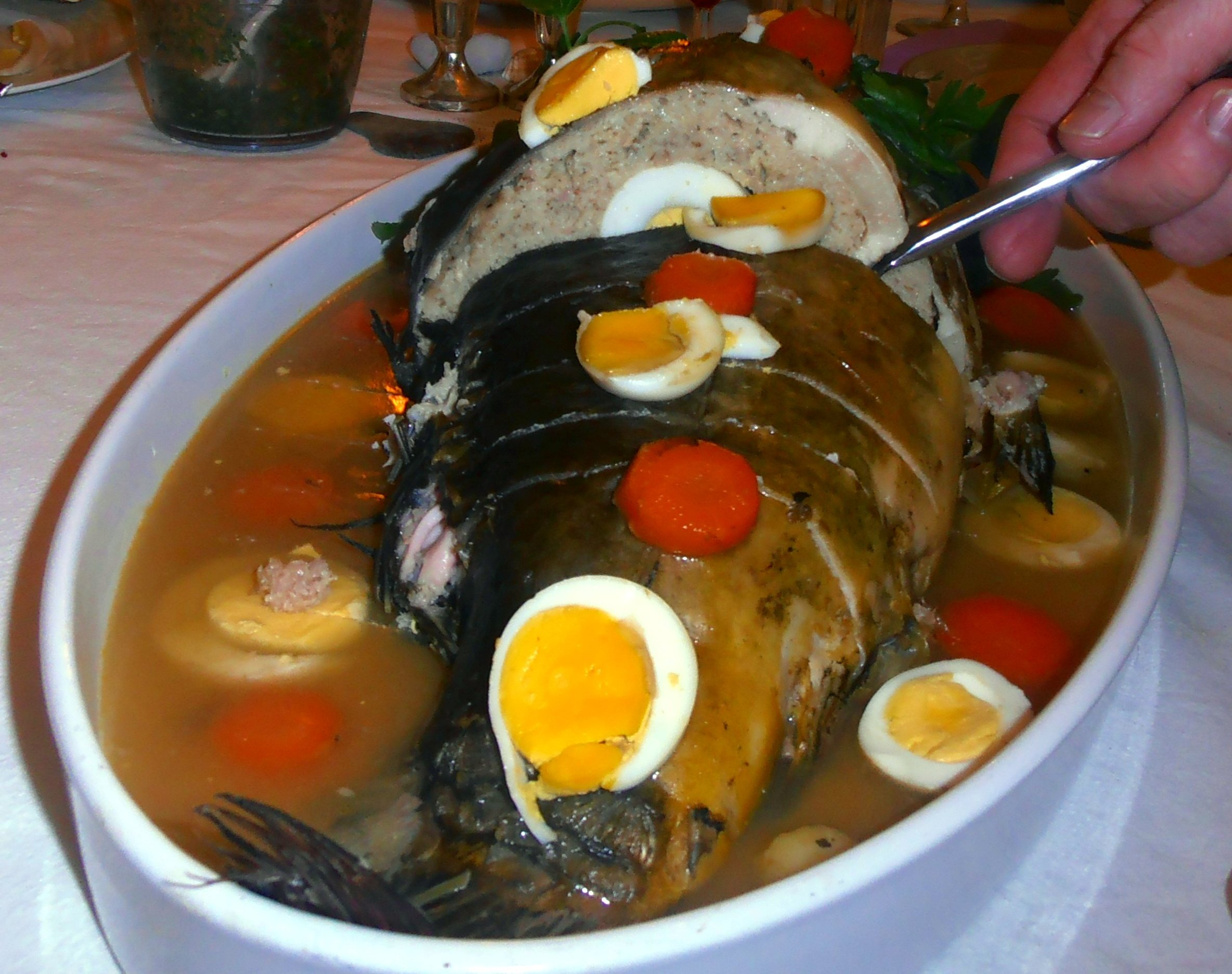
Gefilte fish: whole stuffed and garnished fish with eggs

Gefilte fish was traditionally cooked inside the intact skin of a fish, forming a loaf which is then sliced into portions before serving. More commonly, it is now most often cooked and served as oval patties, like quenelles. In the United Kingdom, gefilte fish is commonly fried. Gefilte fish is typically garnished with a slice of carrot on top, and a horseradish mixture called chrain on the side.

To make the modernized "gefilte fish" fish balls, fish fillets are ground and mixed with eggs (some recipes exclude eggs), breadcrumbs or matza crumbs, spices, salt, onions, carrots, and sometimes potatoes, to produce a paste or dough which is then formed into balls and simmered in fish stock.

Carp, pike, mullet, or whitefish are commonly used to make gefilte fish; more recently, Nile perch and salmon are also used, with gefilte fish made from salmon having a slightly pink hue. Catfish is not used, however, because it is not kosher.

== Sweet and savory versions ==
Gefilte fish may be slightly sweet or savory. Different preparations and taste preferences may be a proxy for reflecting Ashkenazi Jews' specific ancestral origins in Europe. The preference for sweet gefilte with sugar was popular among Galician Jews from central Europe, while gefilte fish with black pepper was preferred by the more northern Litvak Jews. The boundary separating the two camps was dubbed "the Gefilte Fish Line" by Yiddish linguist Marvin Herzog in the mid-1960s.

Sweet gefilte fish with sugar in Galicia can be traced to the turn of the 19th century, when the first sugar beet factory opened in southern Poland. The sugar industry, which involved many Jews, grew rapidly, and sugar was included in many foods in the region. Culinary historian Gil Marks quipped that, '"Other Jews had savory noodle kugels. You didn't have sweet challah. The idea of putting sugar into anything else was absurd." But Polish Jews began to put sugar into all of these dishes. Previously peppery kugels, the now-sweet-and-sour stuffed cabbage, and gefilte fish.'

== Ready-to-serve ==
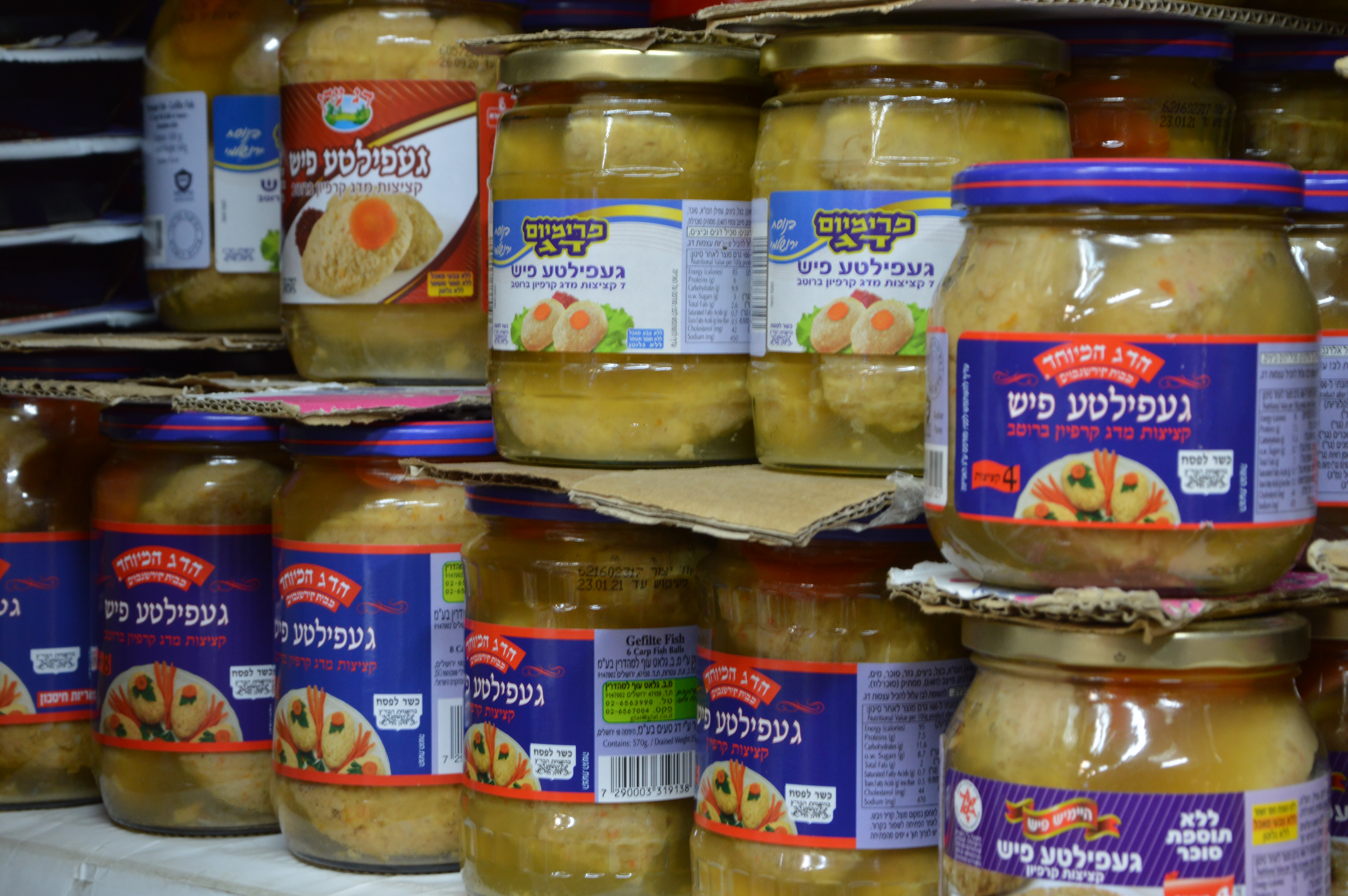
Jars of gefilte fish in Israel

The late 1930s brought a brand named Mother's from "Sidney Leibner, the son of a fish store owner." This ready-to-serve fish was followed by "Manischewitz, Mrs. Adler’s, Rokeach and others."

The post-WWII method of making gefilte fish commercially takes the form of patties or balls, or utilizes a wax paper casing around a "log" of ground fish, which is then poached or baked. This product is sold in cans and glass jars, and packed in jelly made from fish broth, or the fish broth itself. The sodium content is relatively high at 220–290 mg/serving. Low-salt, low-carbohydrate, low-cholesterol, and sugar-free varieties are available. The patent for this jelly, which allowed mass-market distribution of gefilte fish, was granted on October 29, 1963, to Monroe Nash and Erich G. Freudenstein.

Gefilte fish has been described as "an acquired taste".

Grocery stores also sell frozen "logs" of gefilte fish.

== Religious customs and considerations ==
=== Jewish ===
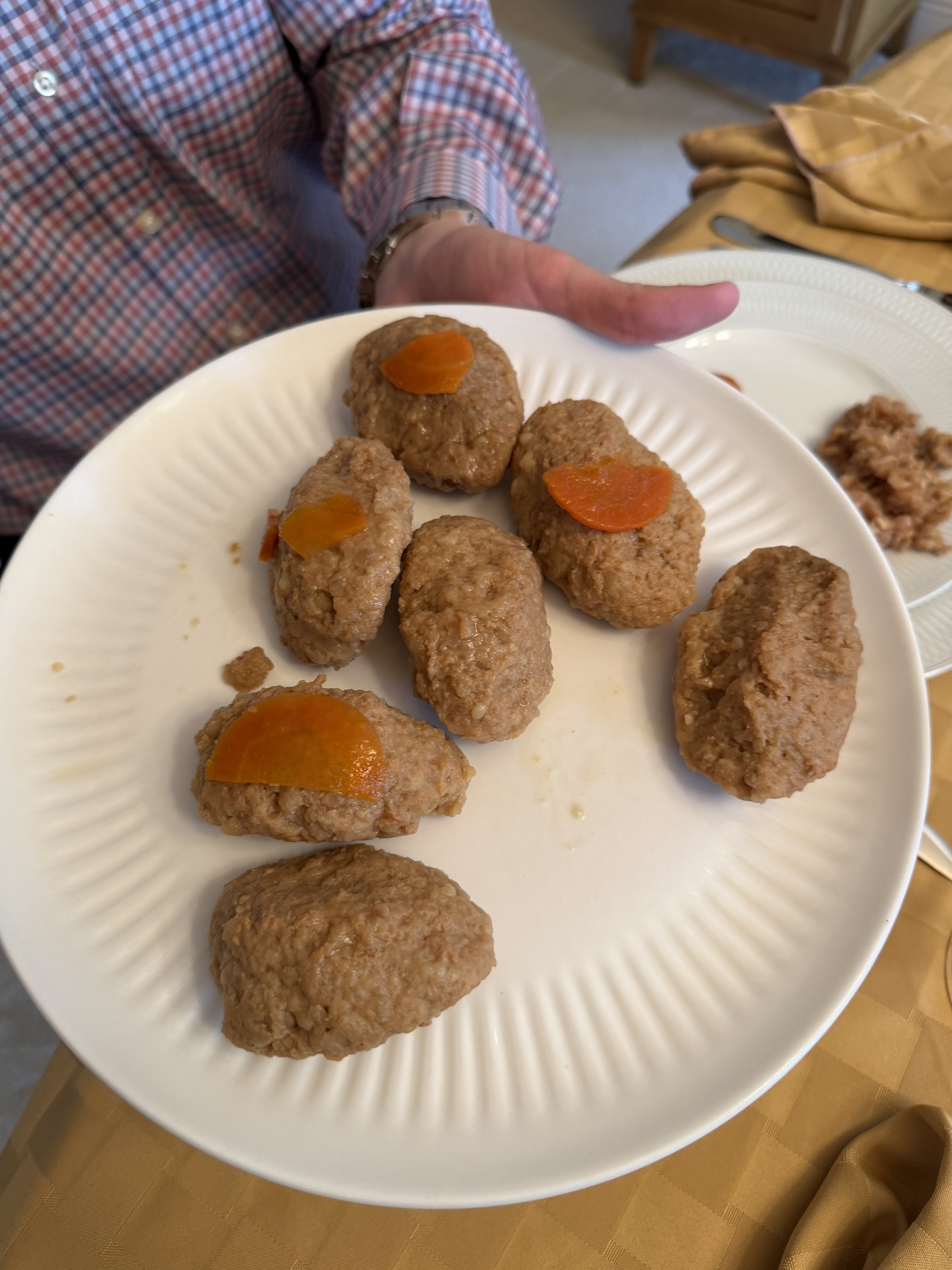
A plate of Gefilte fish for a Passover seder

Among religiously observant Jews, gefilte fish has become a traditional Shabbat food to avoid borer, which is one of the 39 activities prohibited on Shabbat outlined in the Shulchan Aruch. Borer, literally "selection/choosing", would occur when one picks the bones out of the fish, taking "the chaff from within the food".

A less common belief is that fish are not subject to ayin harah ("evil eye") because they are submerged while alive, so that a dish prepared from several fish varieties brings good luck. Moreover, because submersion in the water protects the fish from the evil eye, in the Middle East, fish "became popular for amulets and miscellaneous good luck charms. In Eastern Europe, it even became a name, Fishel, an optimistic reflection that the boy would be lucky and protected."

Gefilte fish is often eaten on Shabbat. However, on Shabbat, separating bones from meat, as well as cooking, are forbidden by rabbinical law. So usually, the dish is prepared the day before and served cold or at room temperature. With gefilte fish being a Shabbat dinner staple, and the commandment in Genesis for fish to be "fruitful and multiply, and fill the waters in the seas", fish at Shabbat meals took on the patina of an aphrodisiac, the sages believing that "the intoxicating [fish] odor on the Shabbat table would encourage couples to 'be fruitful and multiply'—which in Jewish tradition is encouraged on Friday night." Moreover, dag, the Hebrew word for fish, has the numerical value of seven, the day of Shabbat, further underscoring the serving of fish on that day. However, since Jewish law forbids the separating of the flesh of fish from its bones, pre-made fish cakes such as gefilte fish obviate the need to perform such separation, thus making a preparation such as gefilte fish a regular Shabbat staple, and the perfect vehicle for the requisite fish aphrodisiac.

=== Catholic ===
In some Polish Catholic homes (more commonly in the northern regions near the Baltic Sea), gefilte fish (Polish: karp po żydowsku, lit. 'Jewish-style carp') is eaten on Christmas Eve (for twelve-dish supper) and Holy Saturday, as these are traditionally meatless feasts.

== See also ==
- Fishcake
- Polish cuisine
- Israeli cuisine
- Jewish cuisine
- Kamaboko
