= Nantua sauce =

French sauce

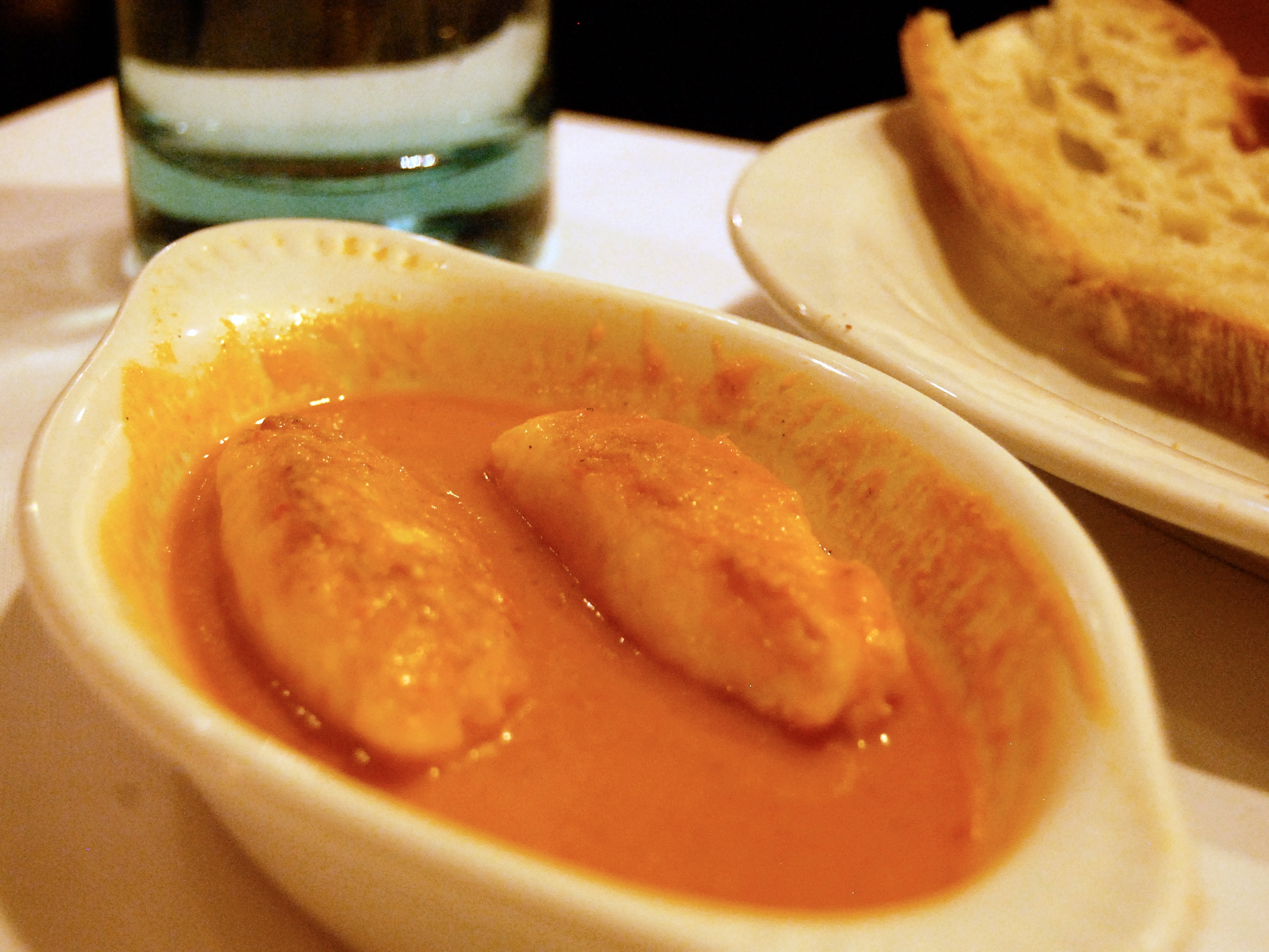
- Quenelles with Nantua sauce

Nantua sauce (French: sauce Nantua [sos nɑ̃tɥa]) is a classical French sauce consisting of a béchamel sauce base, cream, and crayfish butter, along with crayfish tails.

It is named for the town of Nantua, which is known for its crayfish, and the term à la Nantua is used in classical French cuisine for dishes containing crayfish.

Sauce Nantua is the classic accompaniment to quenelles de brochet (pike dumplings), making quenelles Nantua.
