= Quenelle =

Mixture of creamed fish or meat with a light egg binding, formed into an egg-like shape

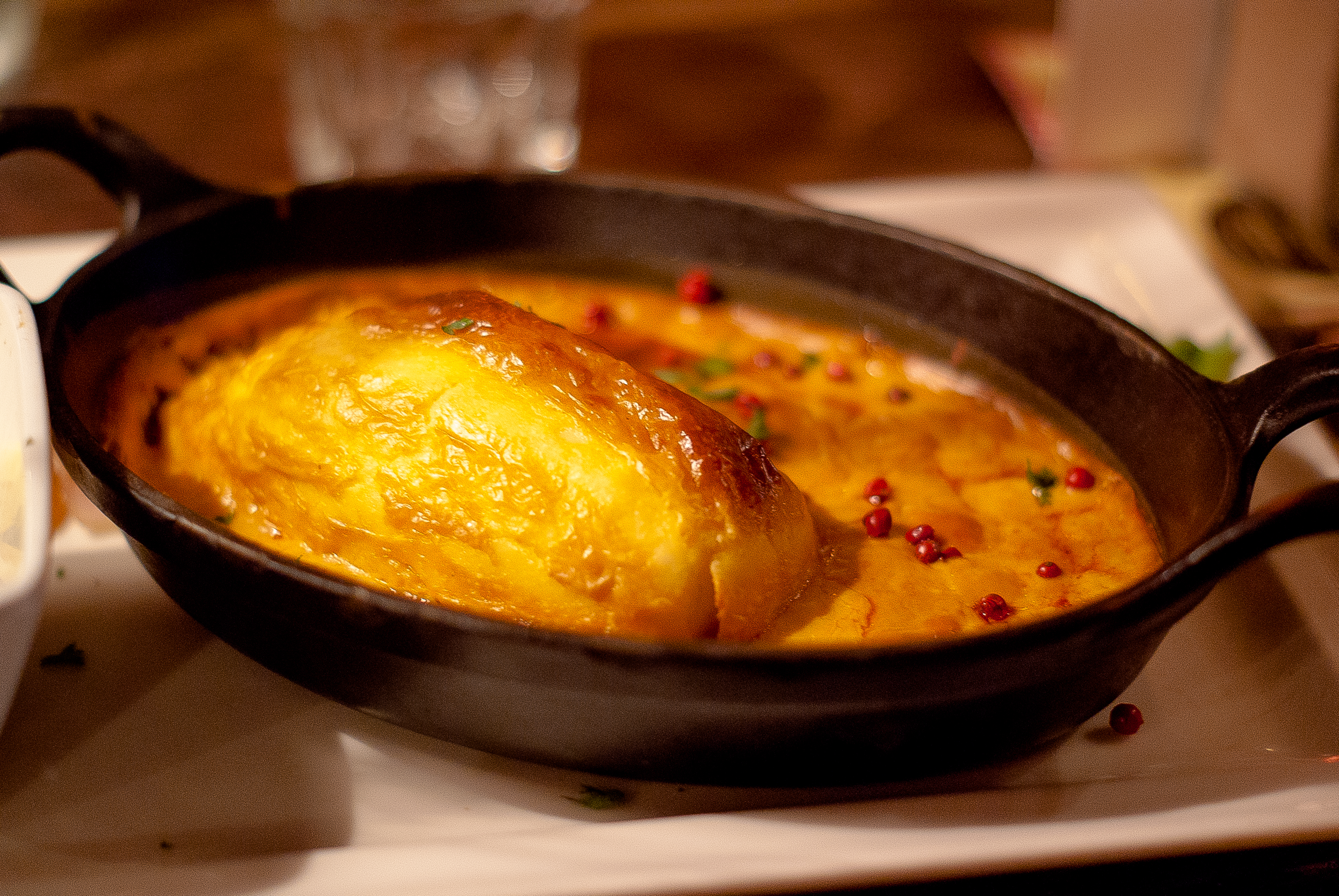
Quenelle de brochet sauce Nantua at a restaurant in Lyon (2012)

A quenelle (French pronunciation: [kə.nɛl]) is a mixture of creamed fish or meat, sometimes combined with breadcrumbs, with a light egg binding, formed into an egg-like shape, and then cooked. The usual preparation is by poaching. Formerly, quenelles were often used as a garnish in haute cuisine. Today, they are more commonly served sauced as a dish in their own right. Similar items are found in many cuisines.

By extension, a quenelle may also be another food made into a similar shape, such as ice cream, sorbet, butter, or mashed potato quenelles.

== Etymology ==
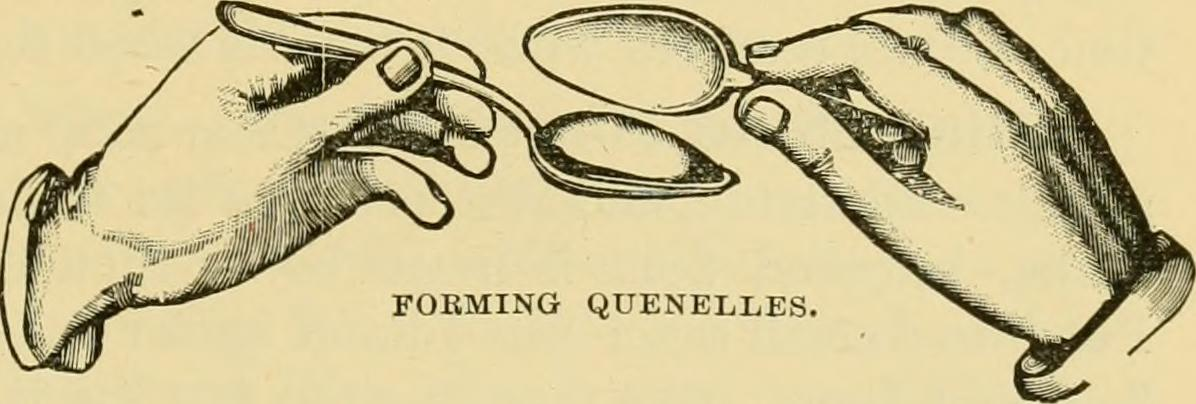
19th-century illustration showing how quenelle dumplings were made

The word quenelle is attested from 1750. The commonly accepted etymology is that it derives from the German Knödel (noodle or dumpling).

== Quenelles de brochet ==
Lyon and Nantua are famous for their quenelles de brochet (pike quenelles), often served with sauce Nantua (crayfish sauce) or sauce mousseline (cream sauce) and run under a grill. The classic dish of quenelles de brochet Nantua or simply quenelles Nantua consists of pike quenelles with sauce Nantua, both pike and crayfish being specialties of the Nantua area. Pike quenelles were invented by a chef named Bontemps to deal with the pike's "multitude of long, fine, forked bones".

Quenelles de brochet are prepared in many ways, but most recipes first prepare a panade, essentially a thick white sauce, then combine the panade with fish, and put the mixture through a sieve such as a tamis, yielding a forcemeat. The quenelles are shaped from the forcemeat and then poached. They may be served sauced and grilled, or with a variety of sauces.

== See also ==
- Lyonnaise cuisine
- Gefilte fish
- Fishball
- Meatball
- Tsukune
- Vorschmack
