= Monroe Nash =

Monroe Nash (September 17, 1912 – July 26, 1997) was an American businessman in the kosher food industry. He and co-inventor Erich G. Freudenstein are credited with US Patent #3,108,882, "Method for Preparing an Edible Fish Product" for the jelly made from fish broth in which commercial gefilte fish varieties are packed. The patent was granted on October 29, 1963.

== See also ==
- Gefilte fish
- Kashrut
- Kosher foods
