= Tsukune =

Japanese chicken meatball

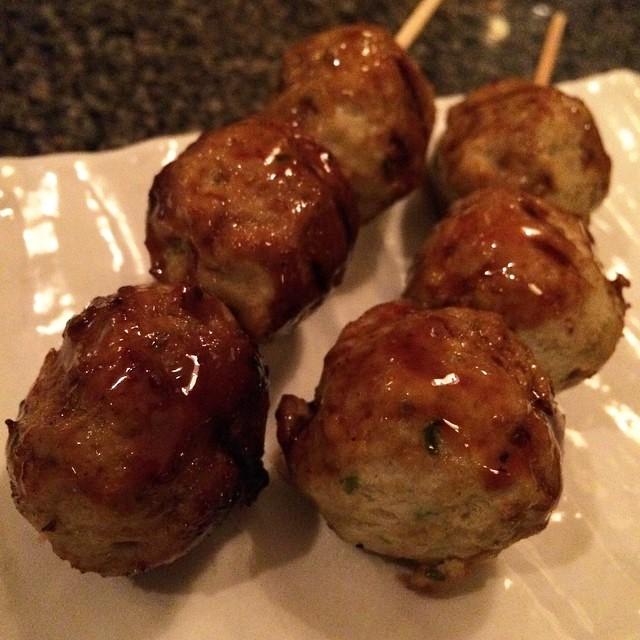
Tsukune

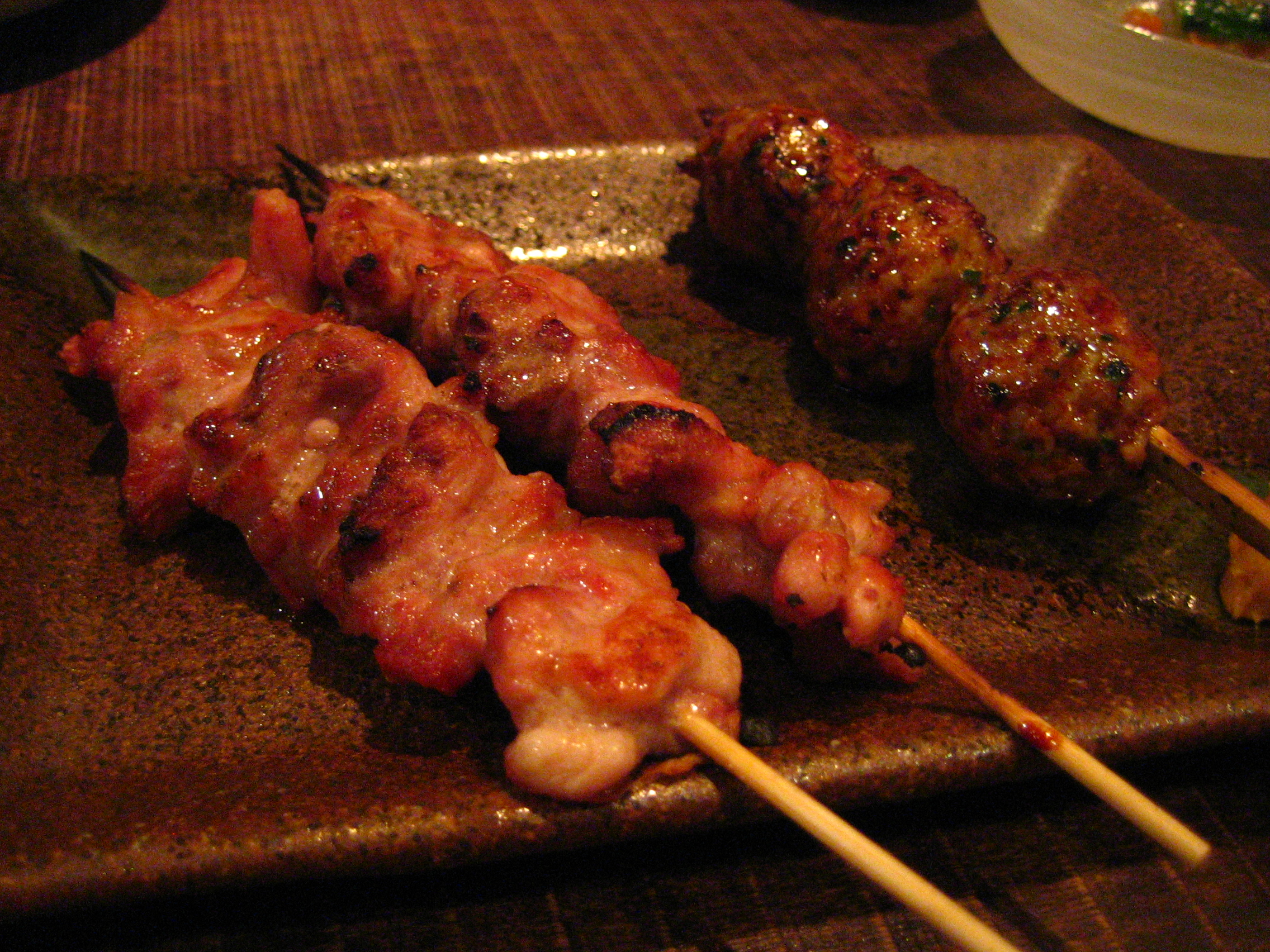
Seseri (left) and tsukune (right)

Tsukune (つくね、捏、捏ね) is a Japanese chicken meatball most often cooked yakitori style (but also can be fried, baked, or boiled) and sometimes covered in a sweet soy or yakitori tare, which is often mistaken for teriyaki sauce.

== Summary ==
Thickeners are added to ground material, such as beef, pork, or fowl, and occasionally fish or lamb. The mixture is then kneaded and molded into a dumpling or skewered.

It also refers to a fish meatball, which is added to hot soup and called tsumire-jiru (つみれ汁), or fish ball soup. Tsukune is also eaten as tsukune nabe, a Japanese steamboat dish with local varieties found in regions in Japan.

Traditionally, a fish fillet was ground using suribachi (すり鉢（すりばち or 擂鉢)) grinding-bowl in Japan, but blenders are now typically used.

Tsukune are traditionally placed on a bamboo skewer grilled over fire or charcoal but can also be prepared unskewered in a frying pan on the stove top.

== Preparation ==
Thickeners, such as egg, crushed yam, and bread crumbs, are added after the meat is mashed or minced finely, along with seasonings such as ground ginger root, salt, and soy sauce. The mixture is shaped into dumplings or meat sticks.

Finely chopped garden vegetables are mixed into the minced meat to taste. Vegetables and herbs such as Welsh onion, red perilla, and at times, chopped cartilage of fowl may be added to create a crunchy texture.

Commonly, tsukune is found in oden (おでん or 田楽(でんがく)), a Japanese stew consisting of several ingredients in a light dashi (出汁（だし）) broth.

== Varieties ==
- Boil: Nabemono (鍋物), a dish cooked at the table
- Broil: Yakimono (焼き物), broiled or char-broiled dishes, including barbecued meatball
- Fry: Agemono (揚げ物) or deep-fried
- Stew: Tsuyumono (汁物（つゆもの） or 団子汁（だんごじる）), stewed with vegetables and herbs

== See also ==
- Dango
- Forcemeat
- Gyoza
- Kebab
- Sate
- Souvlaki
- List of chicken dishes
