= Forcemeat =

Uniform mixture of lean meat with fat made by grinding the ingredients

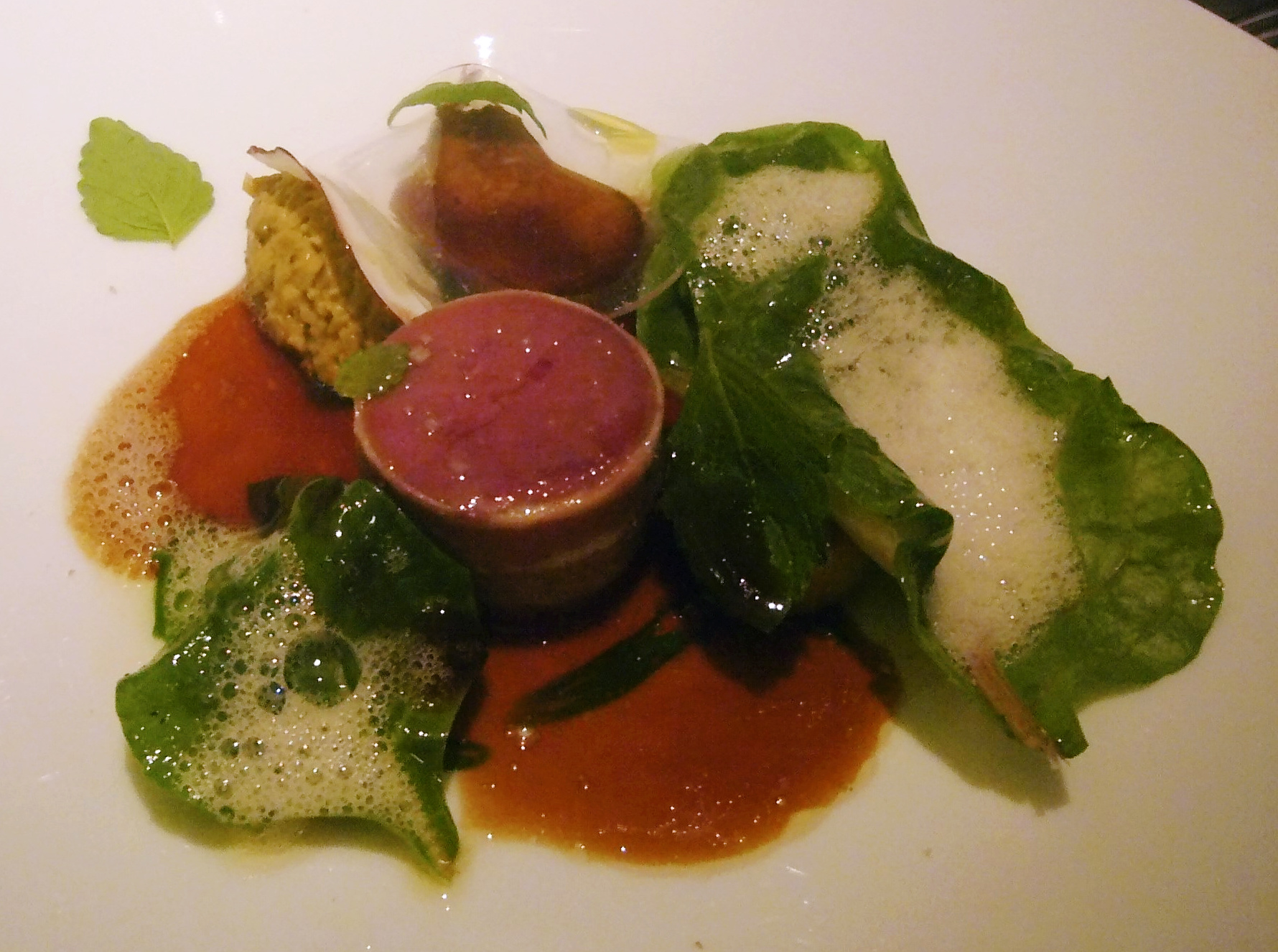
Squab forcemeat with cepes, anise, and combava juice

Forcemeat (derived from the French farcir, "to stuff") is a uniform mixture of ground or sieved lean meat and fat. The result may either be smooth or coarse. Forcemeats are used in the production of numerous items found in charcuterie, including quenelles, sausages, pâtés, terrines, roulades, and galantines. Forcemeats are usually produced from raw meat, except in the case of a gratin. Meats commonly used include pork, fish (pike, trout, or salmon), seafood, game meats (venison, boar, or rabbit), poultry, game birds, veal, and pork livers. Pork fatback is preferred as a fat, as it has a somewhat neutral flavor.

== History ==
Forcemeats are an ancient food and are included in Apicius, a collection of Roman cookery recipes usually thought to have been compiled in the late 4th or early 5th century AD.

== Types ==
Straight
Produced by progressively grinding equal parts pork and pork fat with a third ingredient, a dominant meat, which can be pork or another meat. The portions are cubed and then seasoned, cured, rested, ground and finally placed into the desired vessel.
Country-style
A combination of pork and pork fat, often with the addition of pork liver and garnish ingredients. The texture of this finished product is coarse.
Gratin
Has a portion of the main protein browned.
Pliante
Thin slices of meat pressed together or folded, typically alternating in colour or texture, with fat layered between.
Mousseline
Very light in texture, utilizing lean cuts of meat usually from veal, poultry, fish, or shellfish. The resulting texture comes from the addition of eggs and cream.

== Secondary binders ==
Often, the only binder in a forcemeat is the physical structure of the protein used. Sometimes a secondary binder is necessary to hold the mixture. These binders are generally needed when preparing country-style or gratin forcemeats. The three types of binders are eggs, dry milk powder, and panades. A panade can be made from starchy ingredients which aid in the binding process; these include well-cooked potatoes which have been puréed, cream-soaked bread, or pâte à choux.

== See also ==
- Ground beef
- Meatloaf
- Minced meat
- Pâté
- Pemmican
- Tourtière
- Tsukune
