= Crayfishing in Sweden =

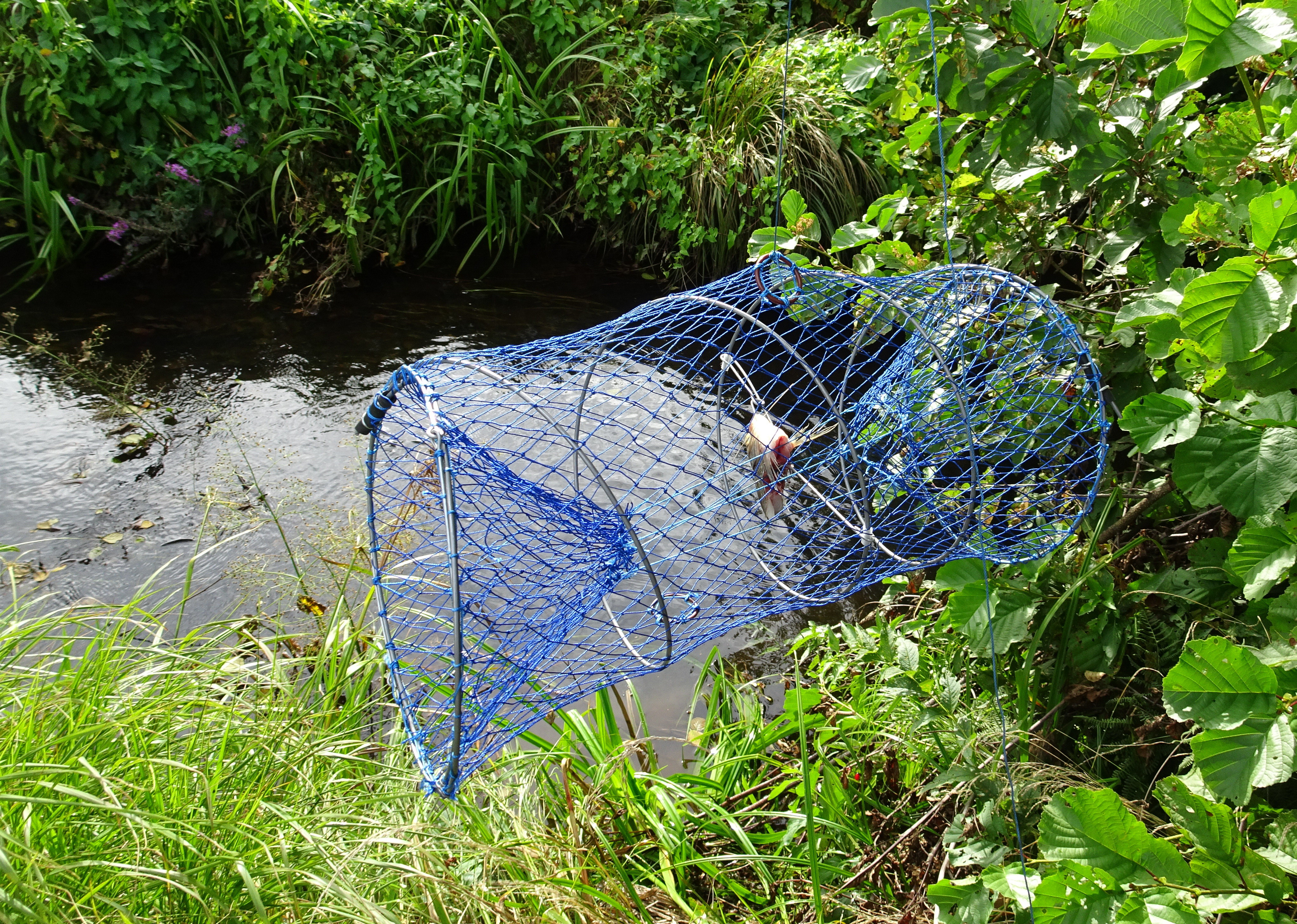
A crayfish trap is set in a river in Småland.

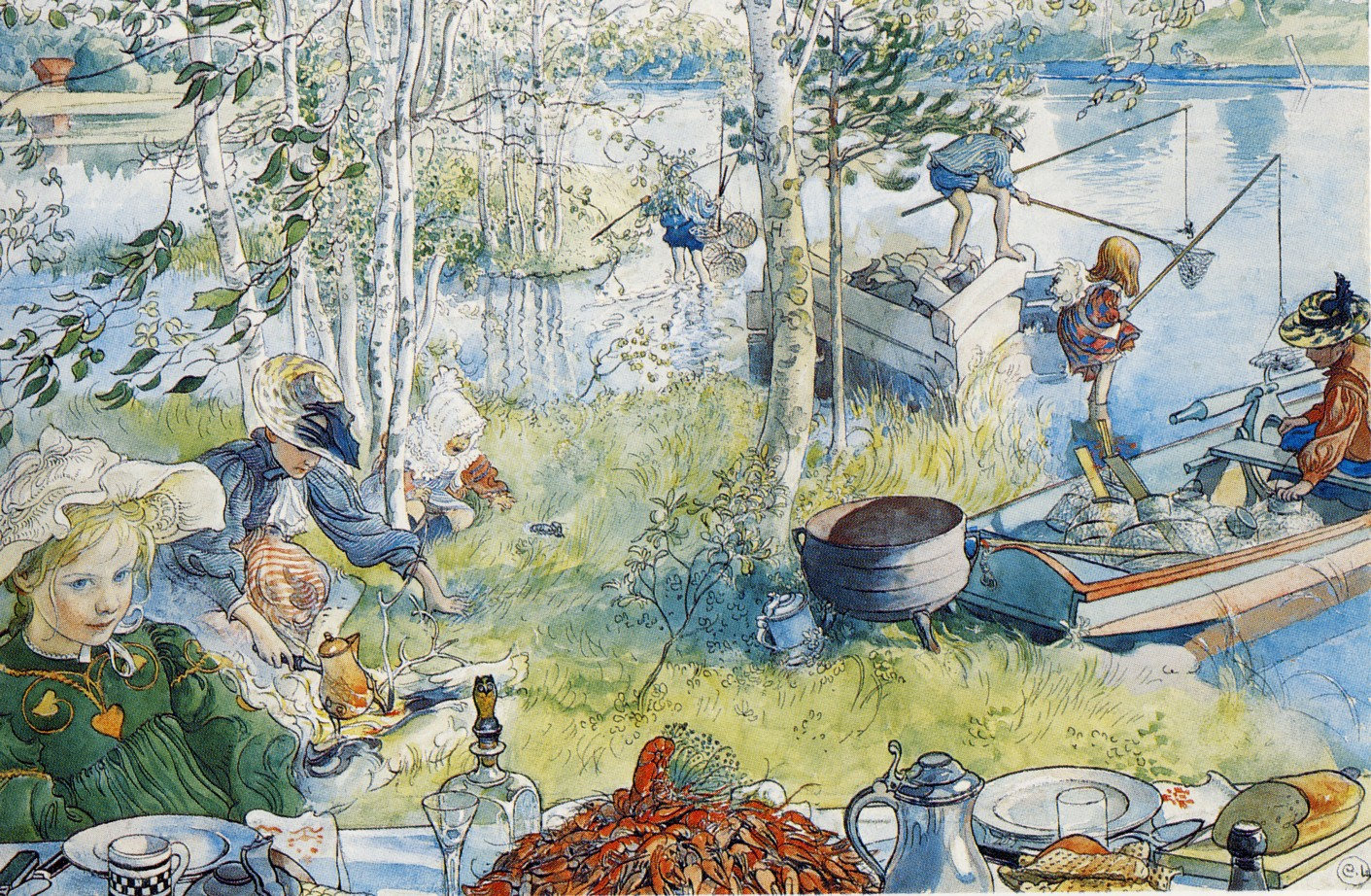
Carl Larsson, Crayfish Catch 1897. The girl that is standing in the water to the right is setting a crayfish net while those in the boat are setting crayfish traps

Fishing for crayfish in lakes in August, before the crayfish breeding season, has been a Swedish tradition that is followed kräftskiva parties. The parts of the country where the non-native signal crayfish has spread has seen a significant reduction, or even extirpation of the native noble crayfish. Boats and fishing equipment being used in multiple lakes has contributed to the spread of the disease that has been killing the noble crayfish. Crayfish are active at night and as a result catches are biggest at night.

The most common equipment is a crayfish trap which is baited with fish like roach, bream and all other white fish. Crayfish live primarily on a diet of vegetation and baiting traps with nettles or potatoes has also been shown to work. The traps are set in the water in the evening from a boat or from land in a river and can be checked on a few hours later. In areas where there are a lot of crayfish the traps can be emptied multiple times in one night.

Crayfish fishing: From the river to the table.

== Crayfish Premiere ==
Before the year 1994 it was the start of the crayfish fishing season was stipulated in the Fiskeriförodningen to be after the first Wednesday in August. Before 1982 there was a fishing prohibition up until the 7th of August at 5 p.m. and as a result there are some that still consider the 8th of August as the traditional crayfish premiere. Today only professional fishermen or people who own lakeside property are allowed to fish for crayfish, the exception being Vättern where anyone in Sweden can fish for crayfish during the correct weekends.

== Handling and cooking crayfish ==
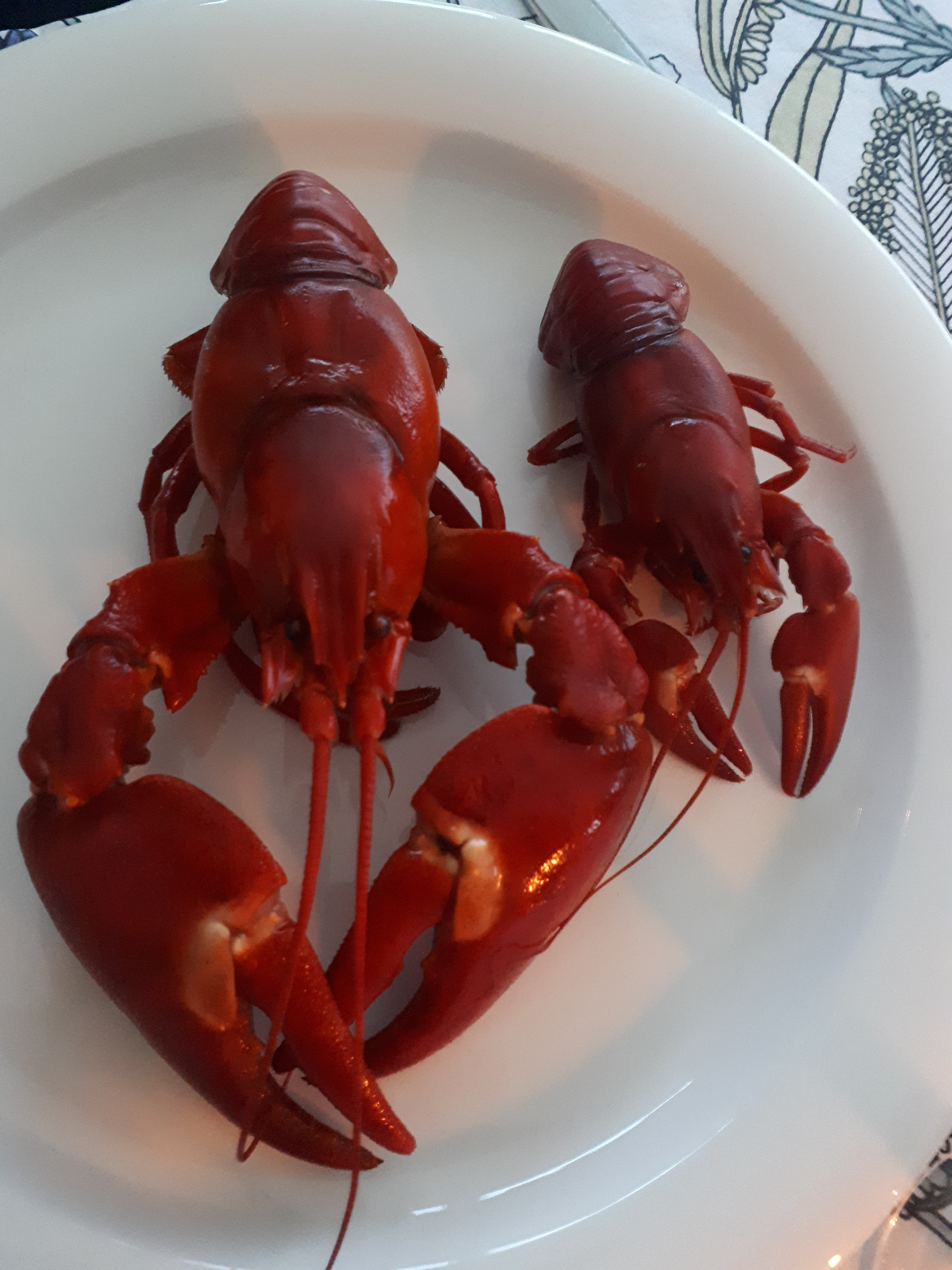
Two cooked signal crayfish from a Swedish lake

After the catch has been taken in crayfish should be kept alive out of sunlight in a bucket with no water or in a lake in a cage so they can have a day to empty their intestines before cooking. A traditional recipe to cook a kilogram of crayfish is 2.5 litres of water, 75ml of salt, 1 teaspoon of sugar and approximately 3 heads of dill. The crayfish are dropped head first one at a time in the rolling boiling water. The water cools down quickly with the added crayfish so it is necessary to wait for it to return to a rolling boil lest the crayfish suffer. The crayfish are then cooled down and are left to sit in the brine to allow the flavours to infuse into the crayfish. Cooling the crayfish in their brine before consumption is a tradition that has only been around in Sweden since the late 1800s. The crayfish are eaten cold at a kräftskiva where traditional Swedish drinking songs are sung and Swedish snaps is drunken.
