= Mont-Saint-Michel Abbey =

Religious building

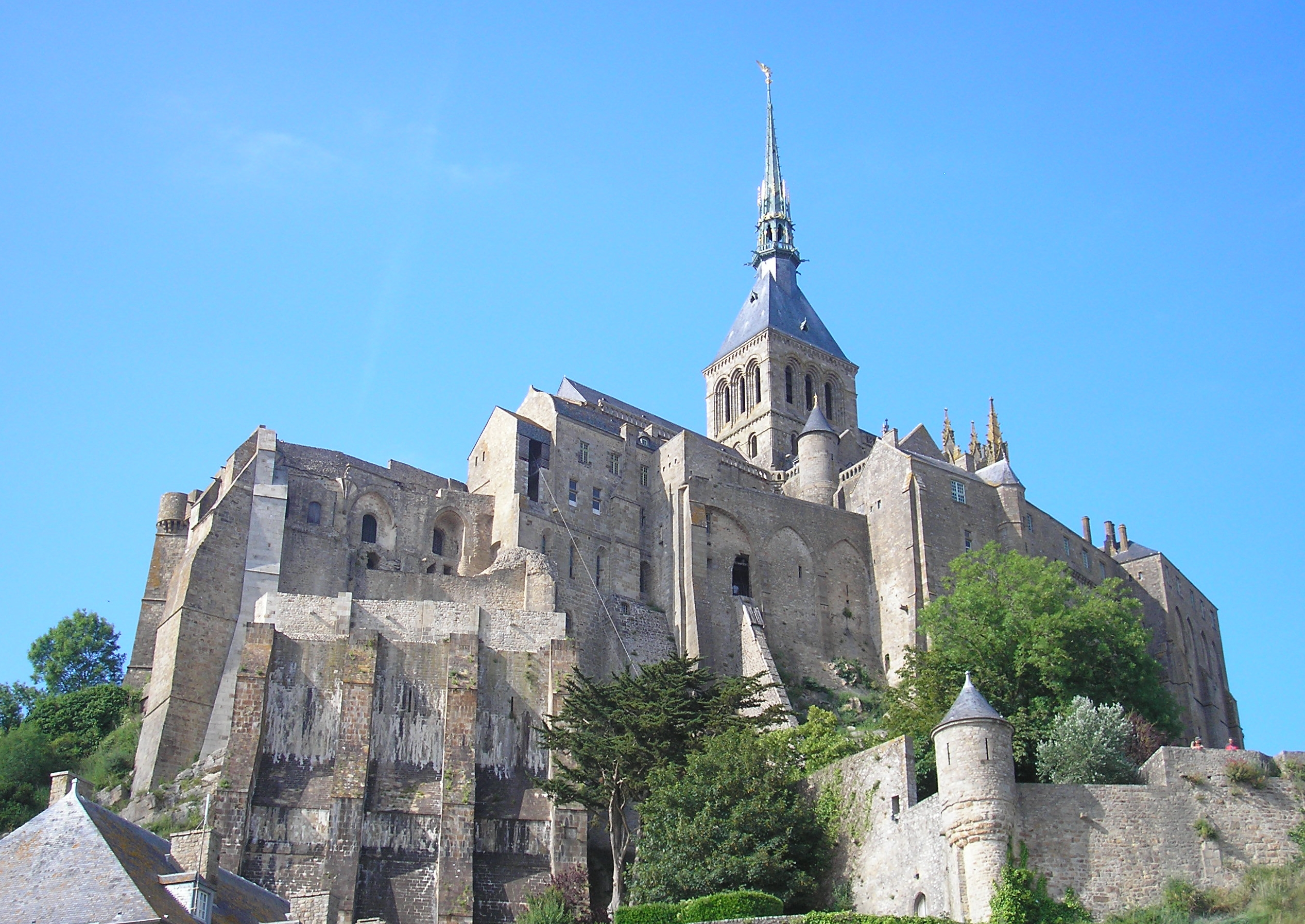

Religion
- Affiliation: Roman Catholic
- Region: Manche, Normandy
- Leadership: Monastic Fraternities of Jerusalem

Location
- Municipality: Le Mont-Saint-Michel
- Country: France
- Interactive map of Mont-Saint-Michel Abbey
- Coordinates: 48.635834°N 1.511389°W

Architecture
- Style: Romanesque and Gothic
- Groundbreaking: 10th century
- Completed: 1523

Website
- http://www.abbaye-mont-saint-michel.fr/en/

The Mont-Saint-Michel Abbey is an abbey located within the city and island of Mont-Saint-Michel in Normandy, in the department of Manche. Now owned and operated as a French national monument, religious services still occur and occasionally monks are invited to take up residence.

The abbey originated as a sanctuary dedicated to the archangel Michael and developed into a major religious centre during the Carolingian and Norman periods. After suffering disruption during Viking incursions in the 9th century, the site was restored under the early dukes of Normandy following the Treaty of Saint-Clair-sur-Epte. In 966, Duke Richard I of Normandy replaced the existing community with Benedictine monks, linking it to the wider movement of Norman monastic reform. During the 11th and 12th centuries the abbey expanded architecturally and intellectually under patrons such as William the Conqueror and abbots including Robert of Torigni. Fortified during the Hundred Years' War, the abbey later declined as a pilgrimage centre and was converted into a prison during the French Revolution which it remained until 1863.

With more than 1.335 million visitors in 2010, the abbey is among the most visited cultural sites in France and is part of a UNESCO World Heritage Site.

== History ==
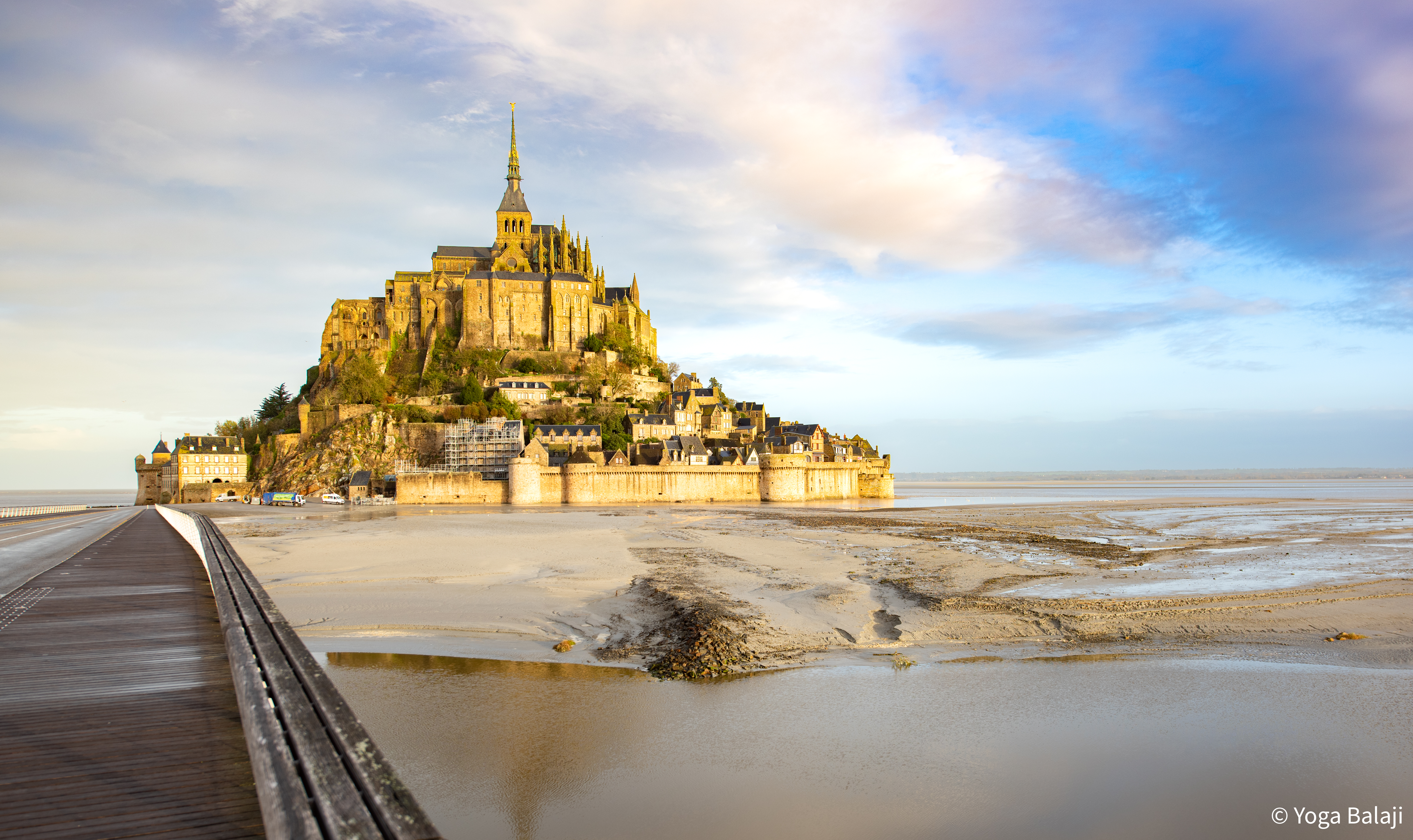
The abbey is the highest structure on Mont Saint Michel

The first text about an abbey is the 9th-century Latin text Revelatio ecclesiae sancti Michaelis in monte Tumba written by a chanoine living at Mont-Saint-Michel or at the Cathédrale Saint-André d'Avranches. This text was written at a time of power struggle between Brittany and the County of Normandy against Francia as well as during canon law reforms by Roman emperors.

When Christianity expanded to the area, around the 4th century, Mont Tombe – the original name of Mont-Saint-Michel – was part of the Diocese of Avranches. By the middle of the 6th century, Christianity had a stronger presence in the bay. By this time, Mont Tombe was populated by religious devotees – hermits (probably some Celtic monks) supplied by the curé of Astériac, who took care of the site and led a contemplative life around some oratories, but there is no archeological evidence and no serious sources of that. It is said two hermits, Saint Pair and Saint Scubilion, dedicated one of the oratories to Saint Étienne, midway through the mont, and one to Saint Symphorien, at the foot of the rock.

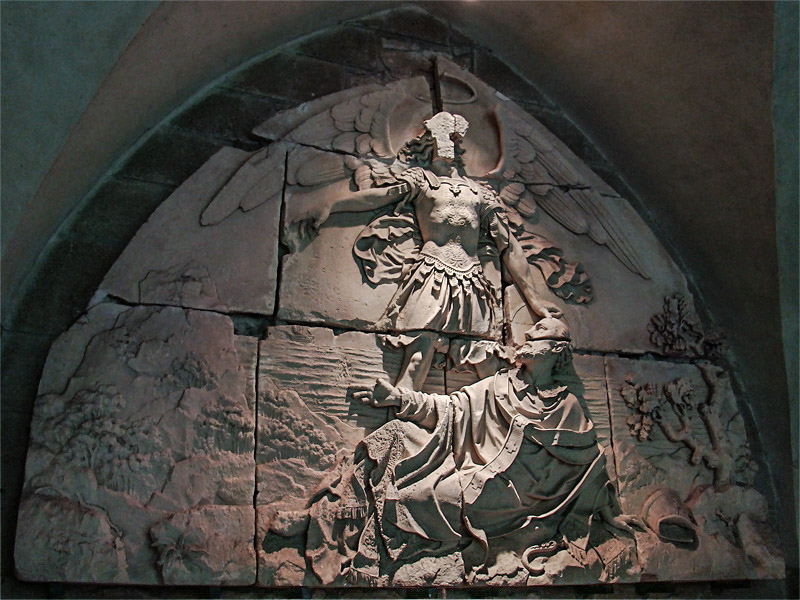
Saint Aubert of Avranches

In 710, Mont Tombe was renamed Mont-Saint-Michel au péril de la Mer ("Mount Saint Michael at the peril of the sea", "Mons Sancti Michaelis in periculo maris") after an oratory was erected to Saint Michael by bishop Saint Aubert of Avranches in 708. According to the legend, Aubert received, during his sleep, three times the order from Saint Michael to erect an oratory on the Mont Tombe. The archangel was reputed to have left his finger mark on Aubert's skull. This skull is displayed at the Saint-Gervais d'Avranches basilica with such a scar on it.

This sanctuary should be, according to the archangel, a replica of the Gargano Sanctuary in Italy (from the 5th century). Aubert had a local religious artifact removed and instead a circular sanctuary built, made of dry stones. Around 708, Aubert sent two monks to get some artifacts from the Italian sanctuary (a rock with his foot print and a piece of tissue from the altar). During this mission, the March 709 tsunami is supposed to have destroyed the Scissy forest and turned the Mont into an island. On October 16, 709, the bishop dedicated the church and put twelve chanoine there. The Mont-Saint-Michel was born.

The remains of the oratory were found in the chapel Notre-Dame-Sous-Terre. This sanctuary contained the tomb of Aubert and most likely the artifacts brought from Gargano. The chapel Notre-Dame-Sous-Terre is today under the nave of the abbey-church.

The first buildings became too small and under the Western Roman Empire multiple buildings were added. Charlemagne chose Saint Michel as a protector of his empire during the 9th century and tried to have the place renamed Mont-Saint-Michel, but during the Middle Ages it was usually called Saint-Michel-aux-Deux-Tombes (Saint Michel with two tombs, in reference to Tombelaine).

The abbey is an essential part of the structural composition of the town the feudal society constructed. On top, God, the abbey, and monastery; below this, the Great halls, then stores and housing, and at the bottom (outside the walls), fishermen's and farmers' housing.

== History of the abbey ==
=== Church of Saint Michel during 9th and 10th centuries ===
The Mont-Saint-Michel monks, during the first century of their institution, venerated the archangel Michael. The Mont became a place of prayer and study, but the stability period, known as the Neustria, during the reign of Charlemagne ended when he died. As the rest of Gaule was fighting invasions, religion and science found some welcoming in the diocese of Avranches and at the Mont-Saint-Michel.

At first, pilgrims kept coming to the Mont. After the Vikings captured the Mont in 847, the monks departed. But, as an island, it offered some protection for the local population and thus never stayed empty.

After the signature of the treaty of Saint-Clair-sur-Epte, Rollo (Gange-Hrólfr "Rollo" Ragnvaldsson de Normandie) started repairing the damages inflicted to the religious buildings. He generously financed the Mont and called back the monks displaced by the war, returning the Mont to its previous condition.

The wealth and support that the Mont suddenly obtained from Rollo started to fundamentally affect its inhabitants, taking them away from their solitary, religious life. After William I of Normandy took over his father's title as Duke of Normandy in 927, he expanded his support toward monasteries until his assassination in 942; but his wealth, from which they benefited, further exacerbated their mundane life style. Because of their generous contributions to the Mont, the Dukes of Brittany Conan 1st, who died in 992, and Geoffrey 1st, who died in 1008, were buried in the Mont as benefactors.

=== Benedictine abbey ===
The rapid growth of wealth of the church-abbey Saint-Michel became an obstacle to its function and nature. The religious used their wealth, coming from the piety of the rich surrounding princes, to satisfy their pleasures. Local nobles tried to obtain the favors of the Mont's religious inhabitants to spend it on meals, travels, and hunting in their company, which became their main occupation.

When Richard 1st, son of William 1st, became duke of Normandy, he tried using his authority to return them to a more monastic life. After failing to do so, and with the approbation of pope John XIII and king Lothair, he decided to replace them with a monastery of the Benedictine order, as mentioned in the Introductio monachorum ("the installation of the monks"), a treaty written around 1080–1095 by a Mont-Saint-Michel monk trying to defend the independence of the monastery toward the state.

After getting the approval from the local warlords and religious of the Norman abbeys, the monastery of Saint-Wandrille, Saint-Taurin-d’Évreux and Jumièges, Duke Richard I sent an officer and some soldiers to the Mont Saint Michel to announce his order: return to a religious life style and become a member of the Benedictine order or leave the Mont. Only one accepted and all the others left, leaving the abbot Maynard 1st, coming from Saint-Wandrille abbey, to establish a Benedictine house. The installation of the Benedictine monks took place in 966, which is marked as the founding year of the Mont-Saint-Michel Abbey. Those monks added the double-nave, pre-Romanesque church Notre-Dame-sous-Terre.

=== 12th century ===
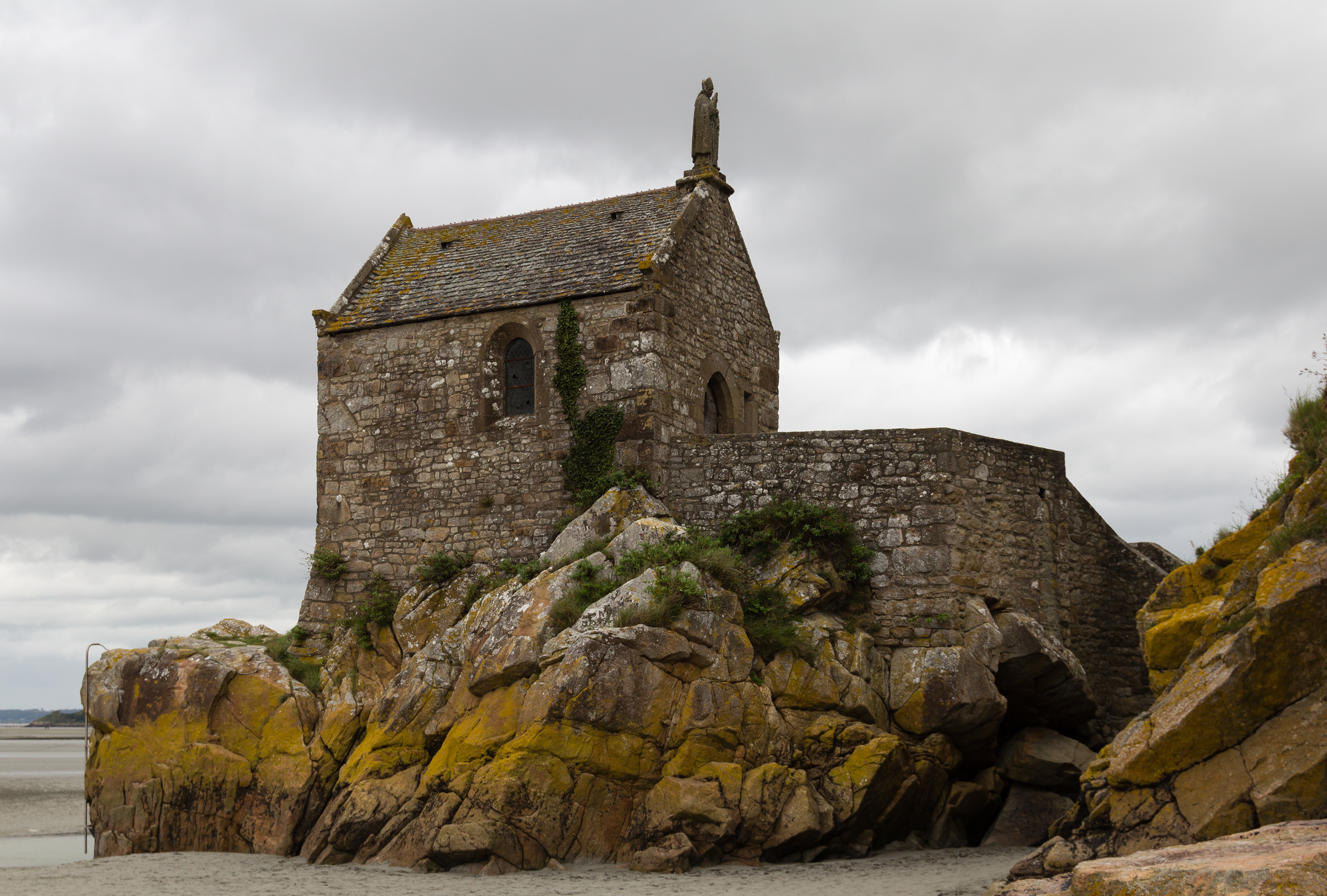
Saint-Aubert Chapel, built around the 12th century, probably under Robert de Torigni (abbot from 1154 to 1186), in honor of Saint Aubert.

The Mont-Saint-Michel was at its apex during the 1100s, with the abbot of Torigni, private counsel of the Duke of Normandy, Henry II of England, reinforcing the structure of the buildings, and building the main facade of the church.

=== 13th to 15th centuries ===
In 1204, France's King Philippe-Auguste started to take over the fiefs of Duke of Normandy John Lackland. His ally, Guy of Thouars, Duke of Brittany, undertook the siege of the Mont-Saint-Michel. After having set fire to the village and massacring the population, he failed to conquer the abbey, due to its stone fortifications. But the fire from the village extended to the abbey and damaged it significantly.

Horrified by the exaction of his Brittany ally, Philippe-Auguste offered abbot Jourdain a grant for the construction of a new Gothic-style architectural set, which included the addition of the refectory and cloister. The "Merveille", built in medieval Norman style, with a circular capital, some spandrels in Caen stone and some plant motifs, was completed in 1228.

Under the rule of the 29th abbot, Pierre le Roy & Charles VI, from 1386 to 1410, new fortifications were built: at the northeast corner of the Merveille, an octagonal crowning element was added to the Corbins tower; at its base, a long curtain wall-terrace overlooking the woods. In 1393, two turrets were added to flank the 1257 gate. Large steps were built in front of the barbican, and the abbot had a fortified residence built, as well as the square-based Pénine tower, designed to guard the Grand Degré.

When King Louis XI founded the Order of Saint Michael in 1469, he intended that the abbey church of Mont Saint-Michel become the chapel for the Order, but because of its great distance from Paris, his intention could never be realized.

=== Becoming a prison ===
Even as some oubliettes have been mentioned since the 11th century, the abbey started to be used more regularly as a jail during the Ancien Régime, becoming a state jail during Louis XVI's reign.

Mont Saint Michel's popularity and prestige as a center of pilgrimage waned with the Reformation, and by the time of the French Revolution there were scarcely any monks in residence. The abbey was closed in 1791 and converted into a prison, initially to hold clerical opponents of the republican regime (up to 300 priests at one point). The abbey was then nicknamed "bastille des mers" (Bastille of the sea).

In 1794, an optical telegraph system, designed by Claude Chappe, was installed on top of the dome, making the Mont-Saint-Michel part of the Paris-Brest telegraph line. In 1817, the numerous modifications of the structure by the prison administration led to the collapse of the hostelry built under Robert de Torigni.

During the reign of Louis Philippe I, some prisoners started a protest that led to the replacement of the prison director, Martin des Landes. Thanks to a corrupt system, the richest prisoners could visit the Mont Saint Michel town, others could borrow books from the monks' scriptorium.

Up to 700 prisoners worked in a workshop set up in the abbey, making straw hats, which started a fire in 1834 and partially damaged it.

After some higher-profile political prisoners were held there, such as Victor Dubourg de La Cassagne, Desforges, Martin Bernard, Armand Barbès and Auguste Blanqui, some influential figures, including Victor Hugo, launched a campaign to restore what was seen as a national architectural treasure, that led to its closure by Napoleon III in 1863. The 650 prisoners were transferred to other prisons.

=== Becoming a monument historique and World Heritage Site ===
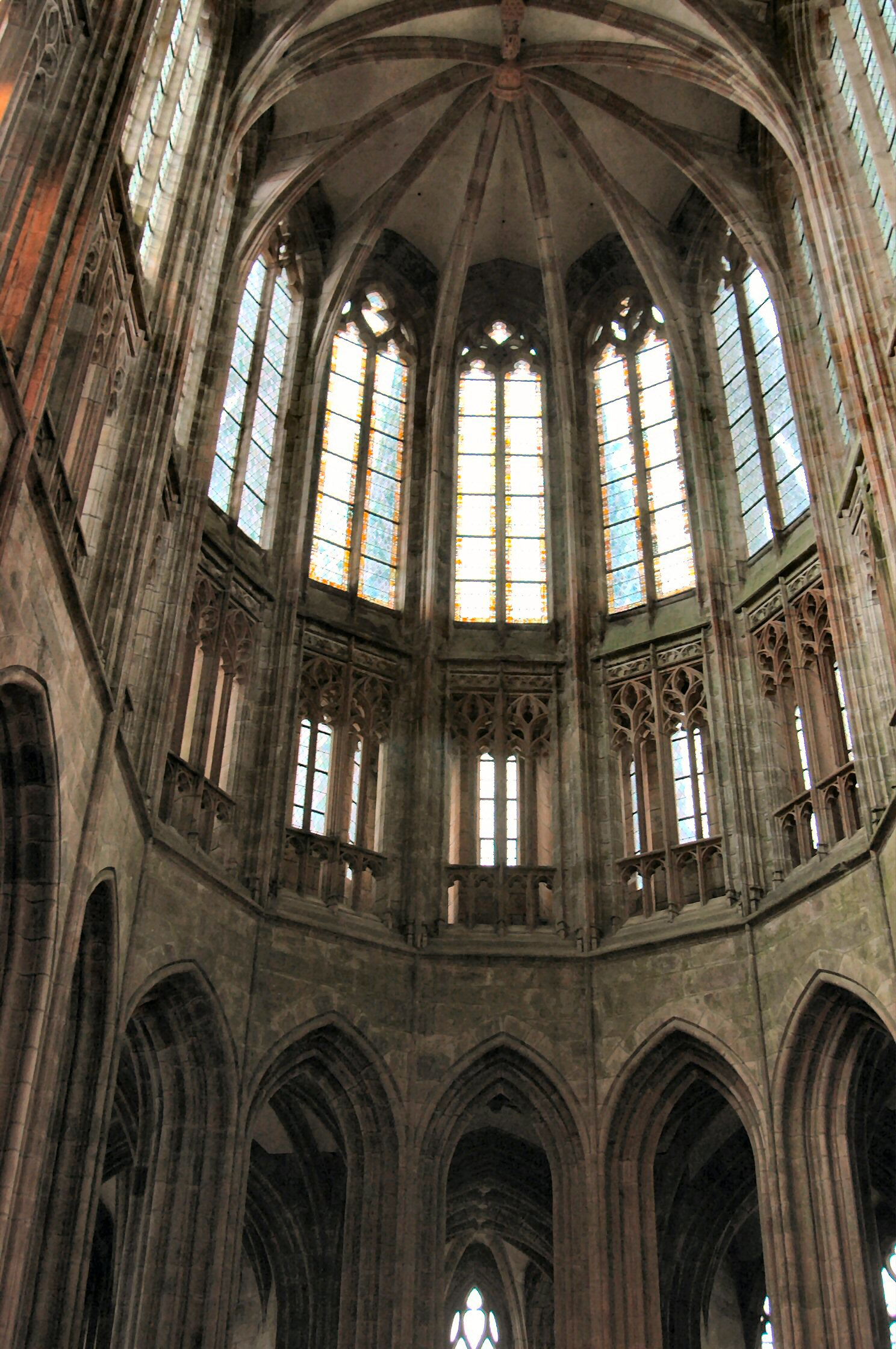
Gothic choir of the church-abbey

It has been a monument historique since 1862 and the abbey was rented by the bishop of Coutances in 1863 when the prison closed.

In 1835, Viollet-le-Duc visited the Mont and later his students, Paul Gout and Édouard Corroyer (the famous Mère Poulard was his maid), were commissioned to restore it. Urgent work to consolidate and restore the abbey was conducted by Édouard Corroyer. In 1896, a neogothic spire, rising 170 meters above the sea level, was added.

The archangel Saint Michel at the top of the spire (completed in 1898) was started in 1895 by the sculptor Emmanuel Frémiet at the "ateliers Monduit" that previously did some work for Viollet-le-Duc.

In 1898, during an excavation under the floor of the church, Paul Gout discovered the Notre-Dame-Sous-Terre. It was completely excavated in 1959, after architect Yves-Marie Froidevaux had a concrete beam installed.

In World War II, the abbey and its surrounding area came under German occupation starting on June 20, 1940. A cable car facility was installed but the abbey was otherwise kept intact, with the German Armistice Commission recognizing Mont-Saint-Michel's historical significance. During the German retreat after D-Day in 1944, no attempt was made to defend the area, which was clear by July 31.

Mont Saint Michel as a whole and its bay were added to the UNESCO list of World Heritage Sites in 1979, and it was listed with criteria such as cultural, historical, and architectural significance, as well as human-created and natural beauty. It is managed by the Centre des monuments nationaux.

=== Return of the monks ===
Starting in 1922, Christian worship was again practiced in the abbey.

In 1966, with the celebration of the abbey's first millennium, a few Benedictine monasteries sent monks to spend the summer there. At the end of the summer a few stayed, led by Bruno de Senneville, from Bec Abbey, with the approval of the state, owner of the place. They slowly started to leave after 1979.

Since 2001, the Benedictine monks have been replaced by some from the Monastic Fraternities of Jerusalem, originally from Saint-Gervais' Church in Paris.

== Architecture ==
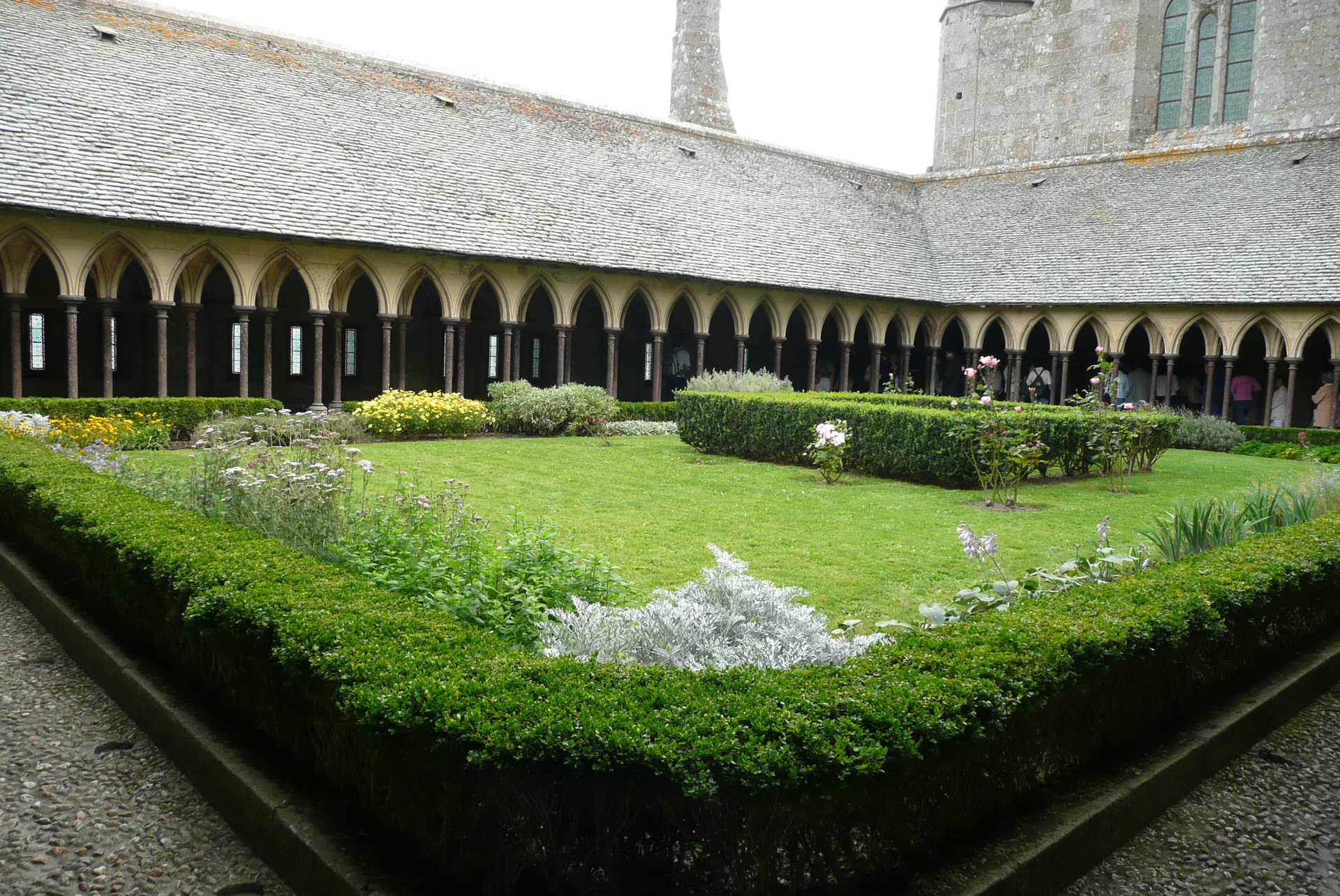
Cloister

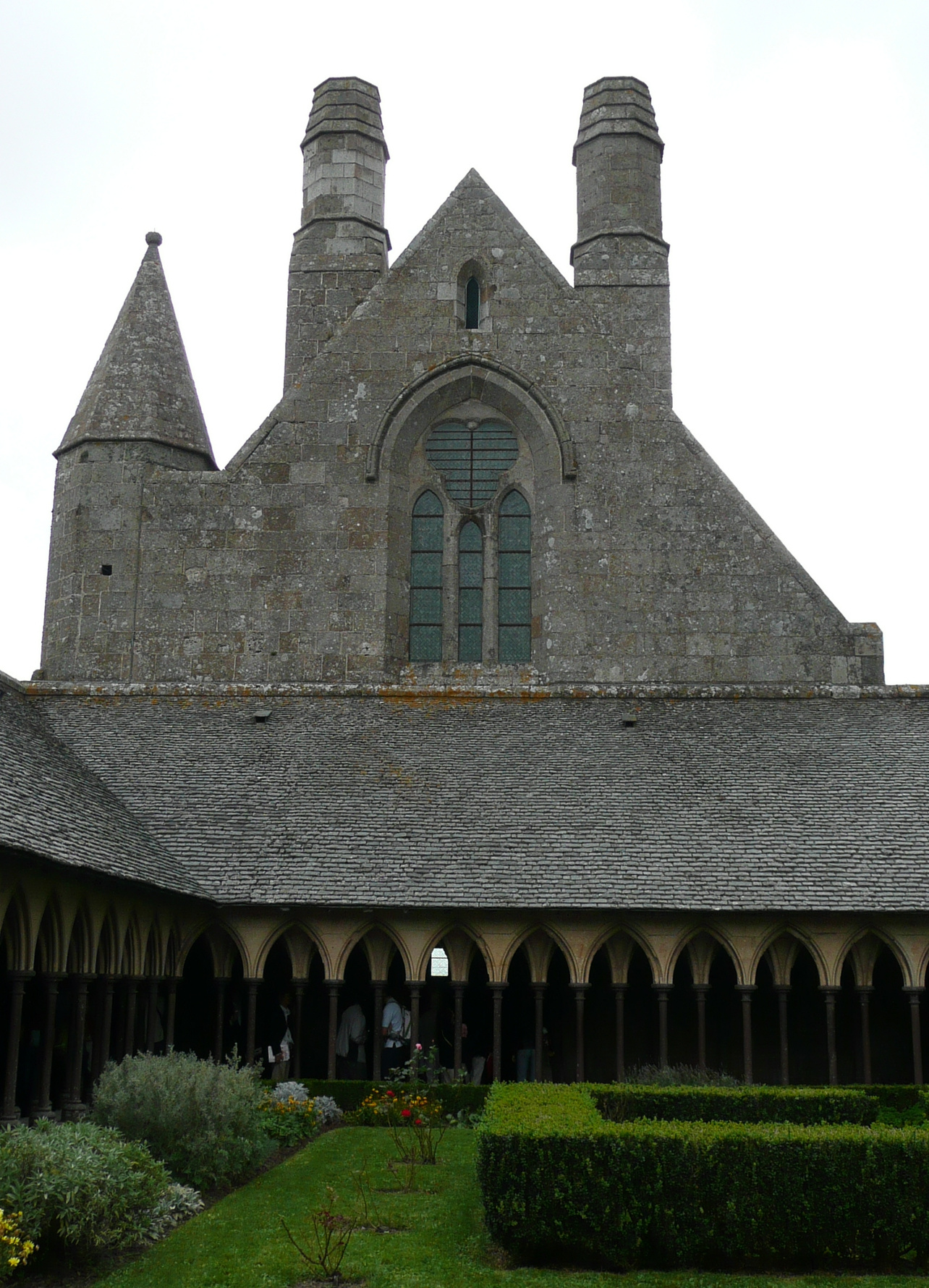
View of the cloister

Started during the 10th century, the Benedictine abbey has numerous architectural marvels from West Roman empire, roman and Gothic styles. The Mont-Saint-Michel could, in that sense, be considered a megastructure where the buildings are on top of each other while trying to accommodate Benedictine activities within a tight space.

The abbey can be divided into multiple parts:

=== Church-abbey and chapels ===
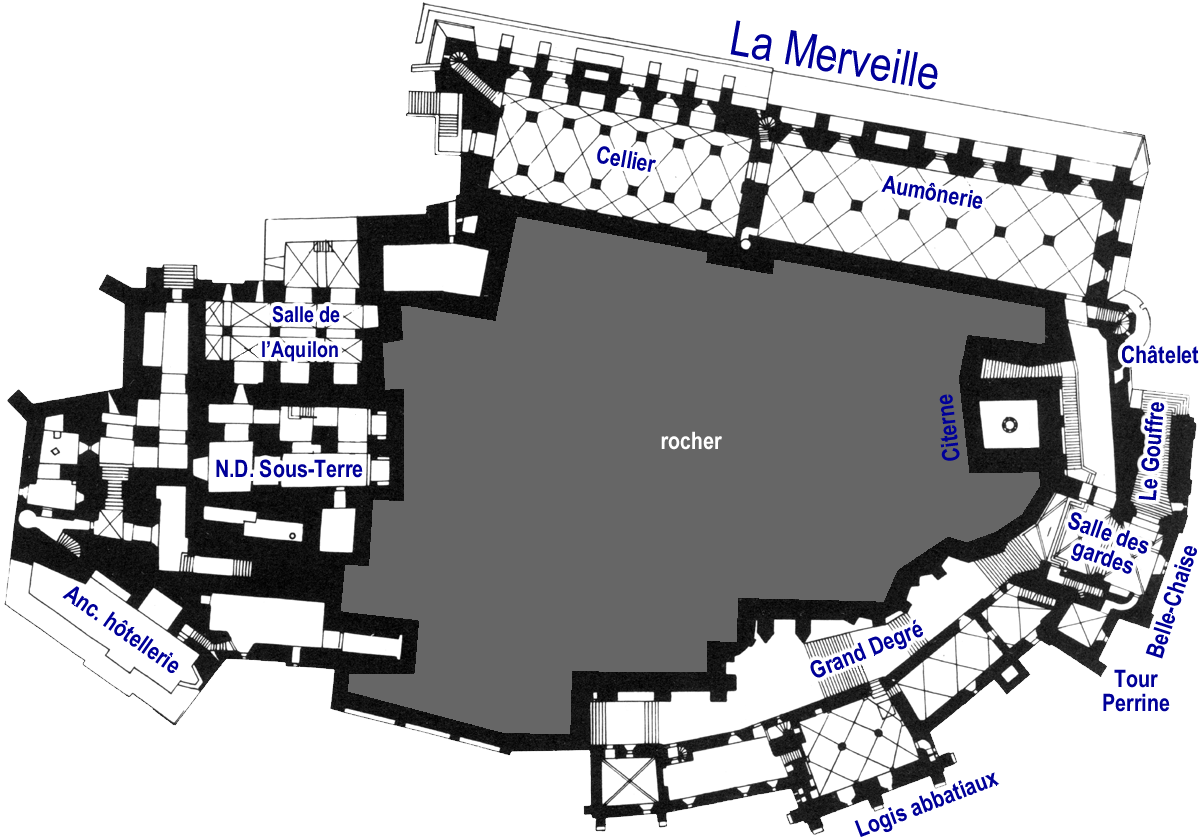
Floor map of the "salle de l'Aquilon" level

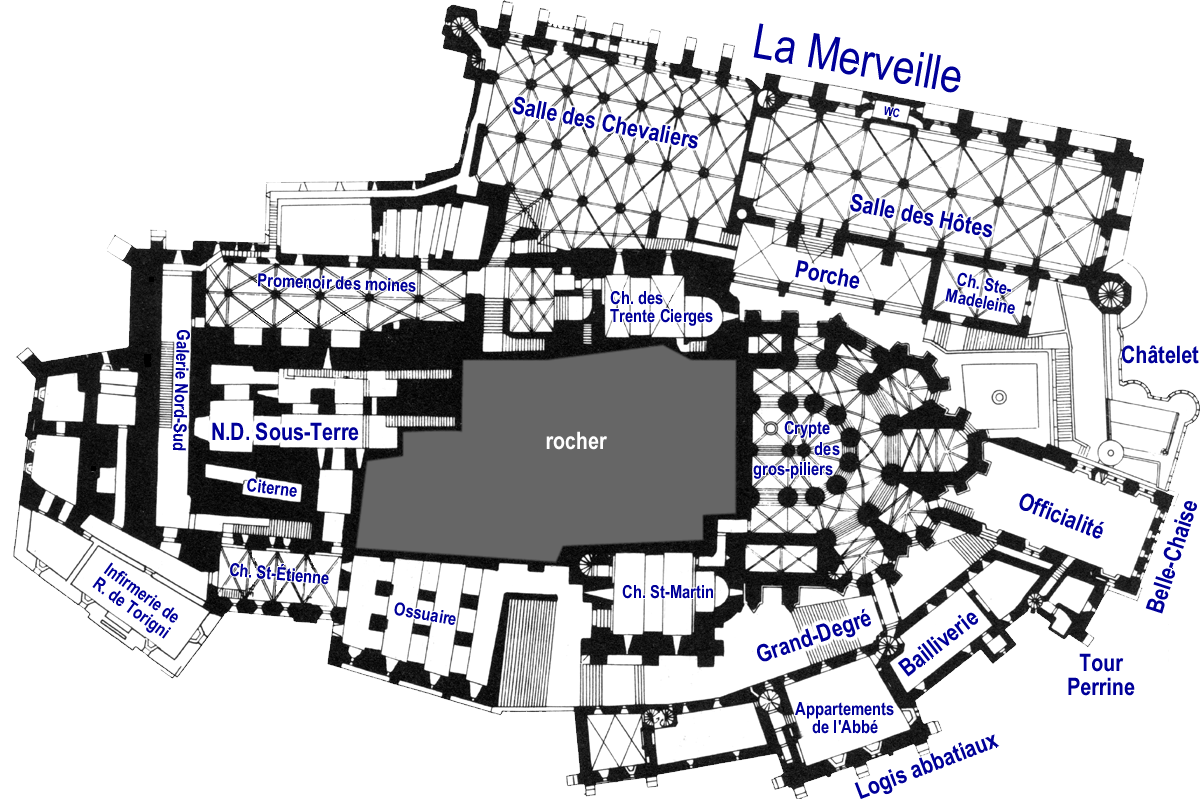
Floor map of the "salle des Chevaliers" level

==== Notre-Dame Sous-Terre ("Our Mother Underground") ====
The original church-abbey was founded in 966 but later completely covered by the multiple expansions of the abbey and was then forgotten for many centuries. These parts of the abbey were rediscovered below the western terrace near the end of the 19th and beginning of the 20th century. It has since been restored and offers a beautiful example of pre-Roman architecture.

The other church-abbey buildings were erected to the East of the original church, on top of the rock and above the church itself.

==== Abbey church ====
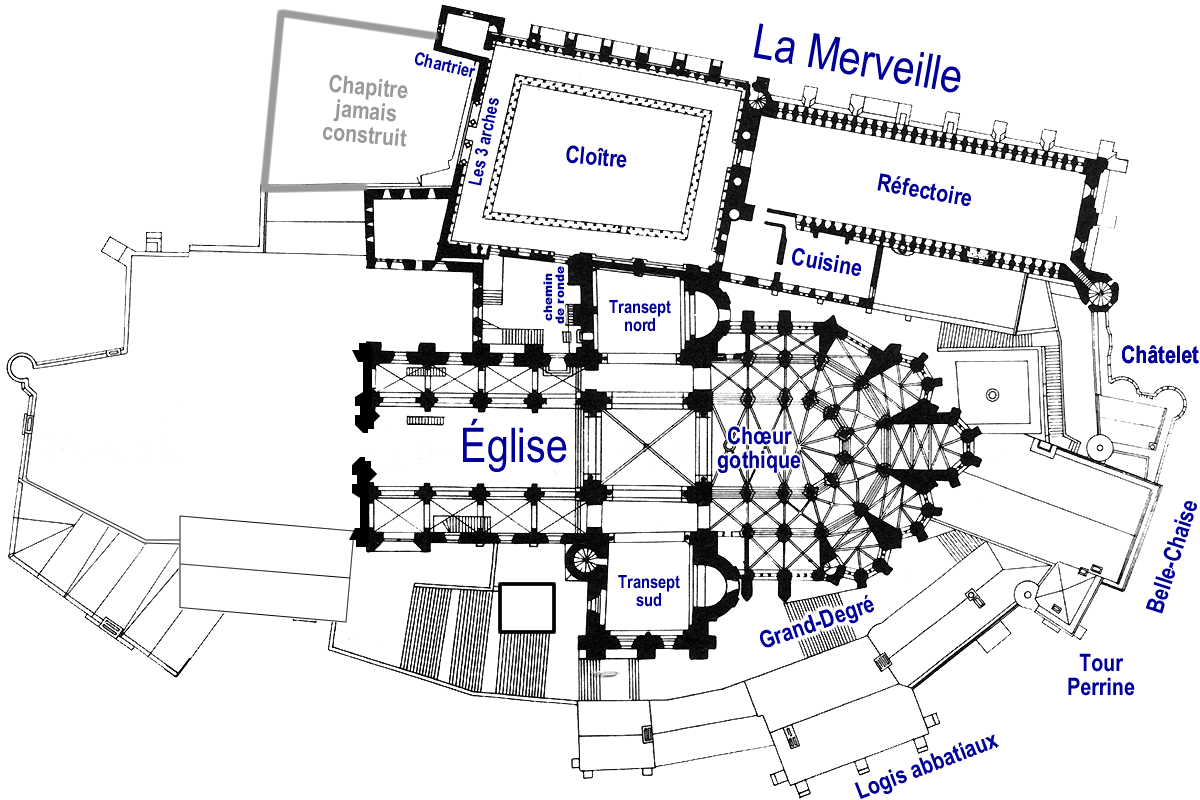
Floor map at the level of the church-abbey

As more pilgrims came to the Mont Saint Michel, the abbey was expanded by building a new abbey church at the site of the monks' quarters, which was moved to the north of Notre-Dame-Sous-Terre.

The new church-abbey first had three crypts built: the Trente-Cierges chapel (under the North wing), the choir crypt (to the East) and Saint-Martin chapel (under the South wing) (1031–1047). Then Abbot Ranulphe started the construction of the nave in 1060. In 1080, three levels were built to the North of Notre-Dame-Sous-Terre, including the "salle de l’Aquilon", which served as chaplaincy to host pilgrims, the monk promenade and a dormitory. The wine cellar and chaplaincy for the future "Merveille" were also started.

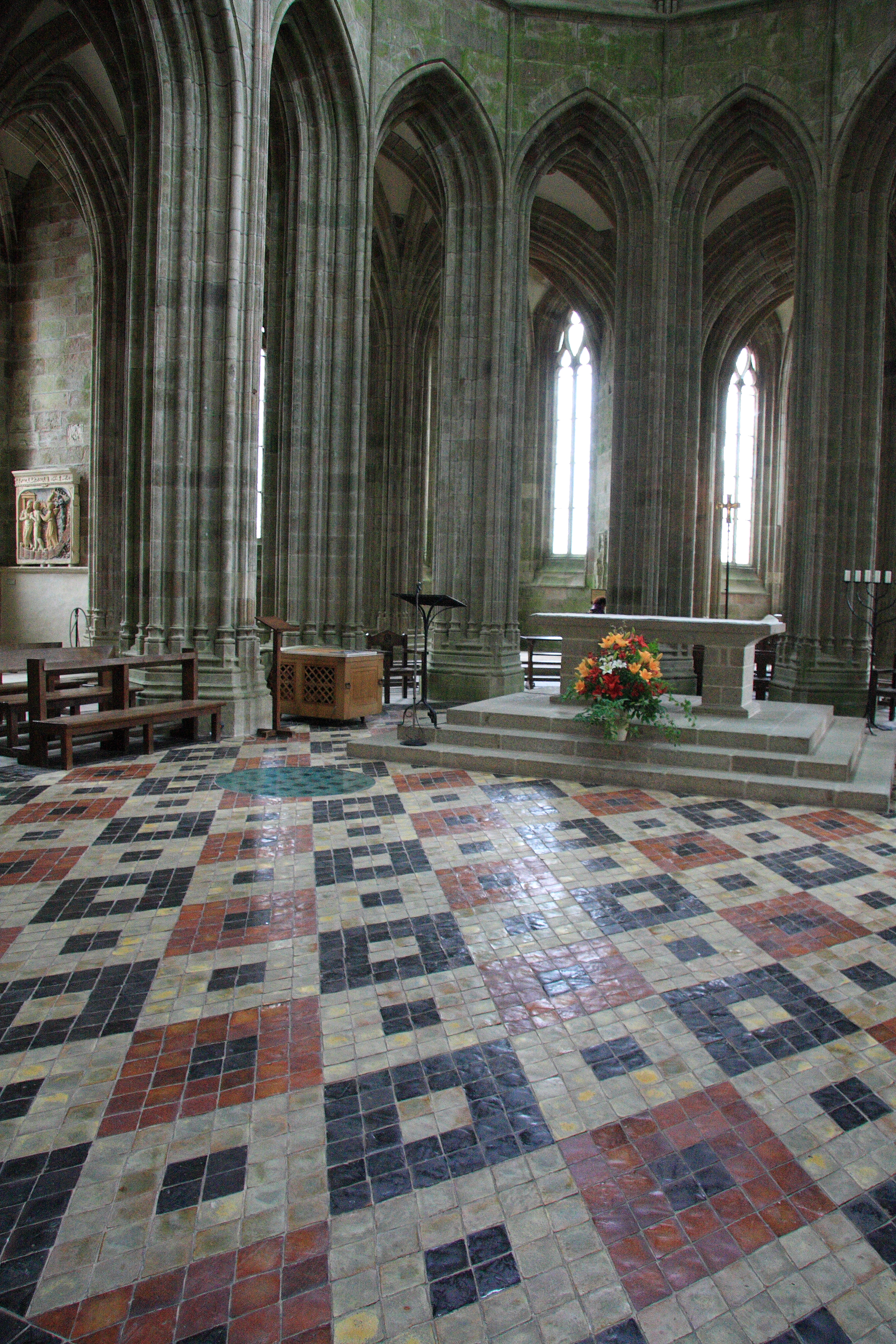
Interior of the church-abbey Saint-Michel.

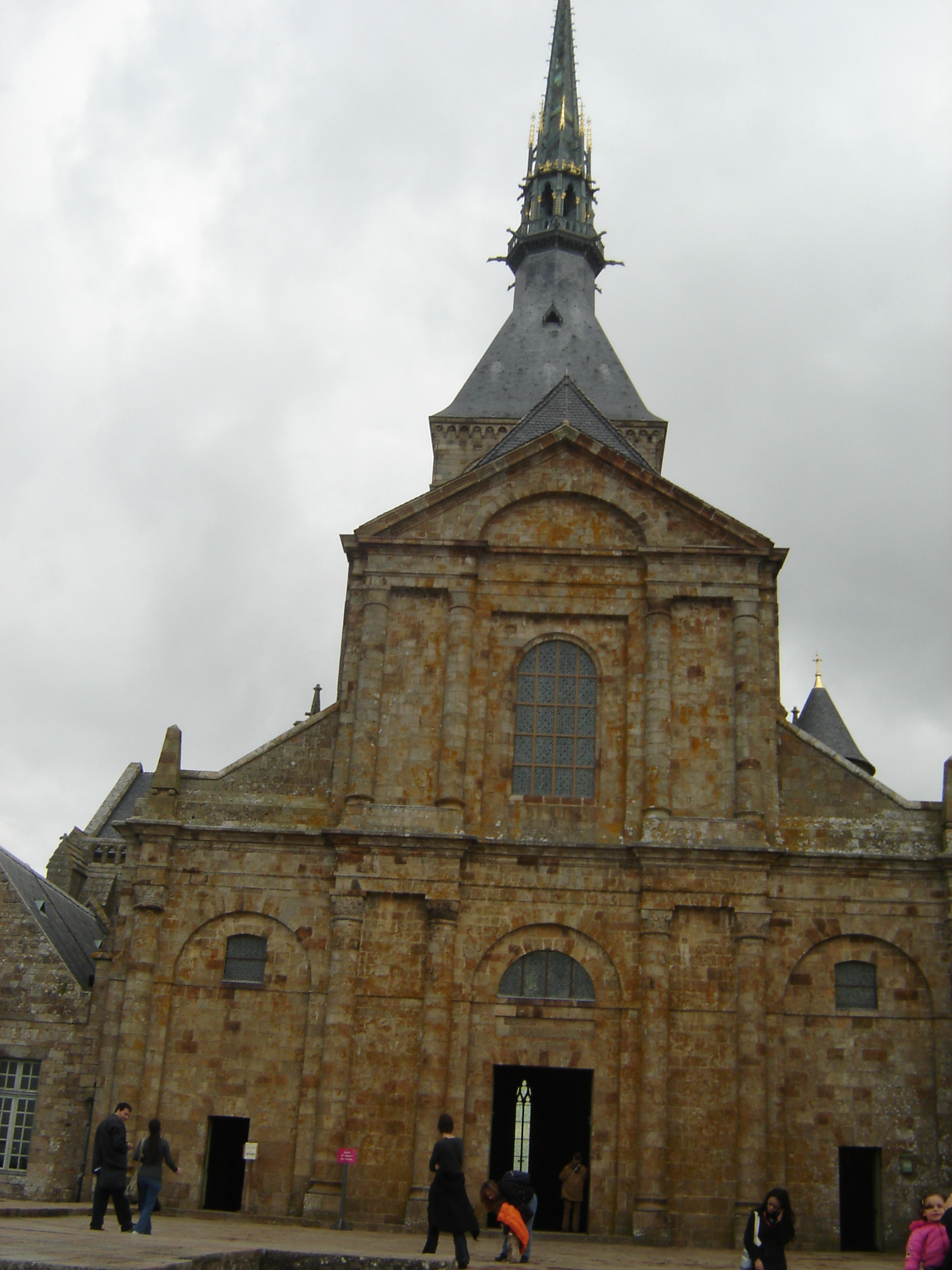
Classic facade of the church-abbey Saint-Michel.

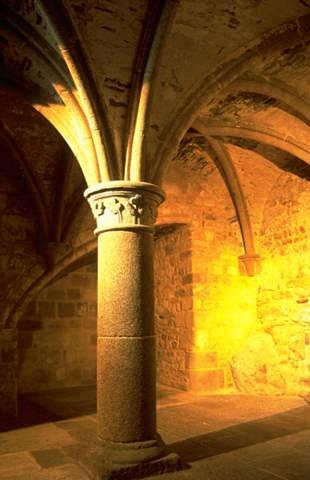
Pillar in one of the lodging rooms.

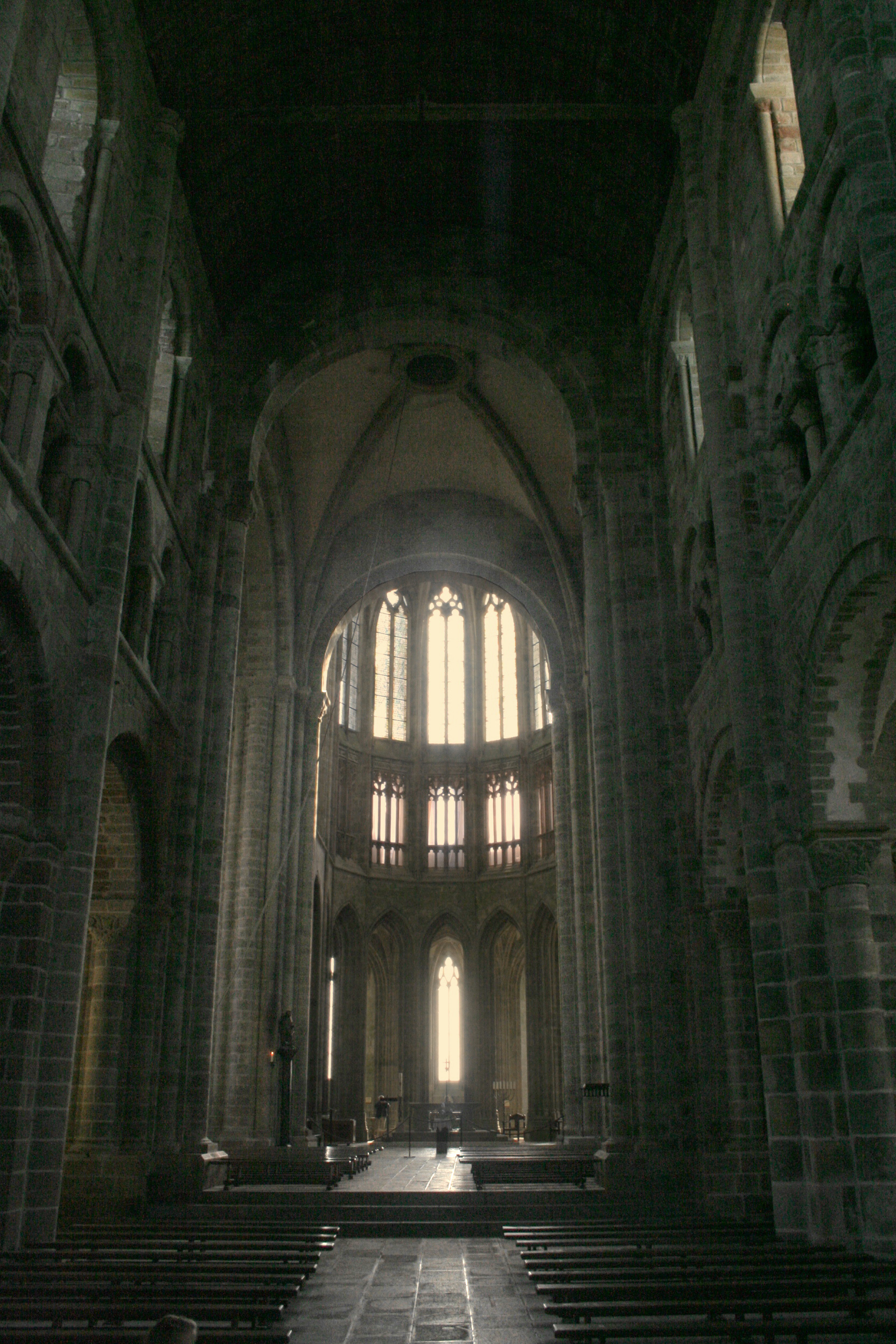
Nave of the abbey

By then the new buildings fully covered Notre-Dame-Sous-Terre which was still used for religious activities.

Reconstructions

Badly built, three spans on the West side of the nave collapsed in 1103. Abbot Roger II had them rebuilt in 1115–1125. In 1421, the Romanesque choir collapsed. It was rebuilt in Flamboyant-Gothic style from 1446 to 1523 (with a construction break from 1450 to 1499).

The classic front of the abbey-church

After a fire in 1776, it was decided to destroy the three western spans of the nave and, in 1780, the current Neo-Classic front was built. The foundations to support it led to the split in two of Notre-Dame-Sous-Terre.

The statue of Archangel Michael

In March 2016, a helicopter was used to temporarily remove the golden statue of Archangel Michael on the top of the spire, in order to restore its lightning rod device, in a dramatic but successful operation.

=== The "Merveille" and the monk buildings ===
The Mont-Saint-Michel abbey is divided in two parts: the church-abbey and the "Merveille". The "Merveille" was the monk living area. Seen from outside, it has a gothic front, on the North side, has three levels and was built over 25 years.

The "Merveille" can be subdivided into two parts: the East and the West sides. The East side was built first (from 1211 to 1218) and has three rooms: the chaplaincy, the hosts room and the dining-hall (from bottom to top). The West side was built seven years later and has three rooms: the wine cellar, the Knights room and the cloister.

=== Robert de Torigni buildings ===
From 1154 to 1164 the abbot Robert of Torigni had a set of buildings added to the West and Southwest of the abbey containing lodgings for: the officiality, a new hostelry, an infirmary and the Saint-Étienne chapel. He also modified the access ways to Notre-Dame-Sous-Terre, to prevent too many contacts between monks and pilgrims.

There is also a treadwheel crane which served as a windlass, installed during the use of the site as a prison, to bring supplies to the prisoners. Some prisoners would walk inside the wheel to rotate it.

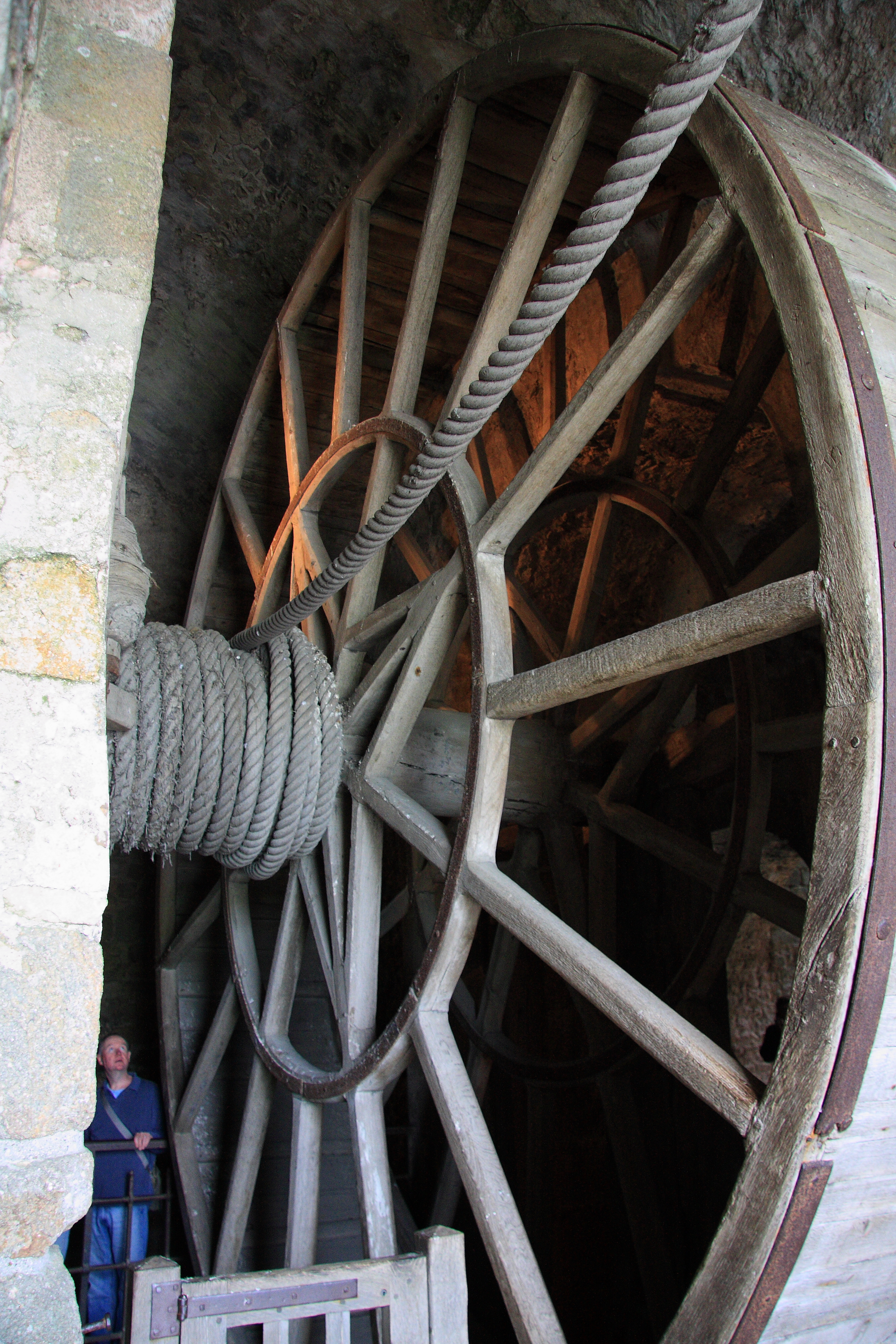
Treadwheel crane

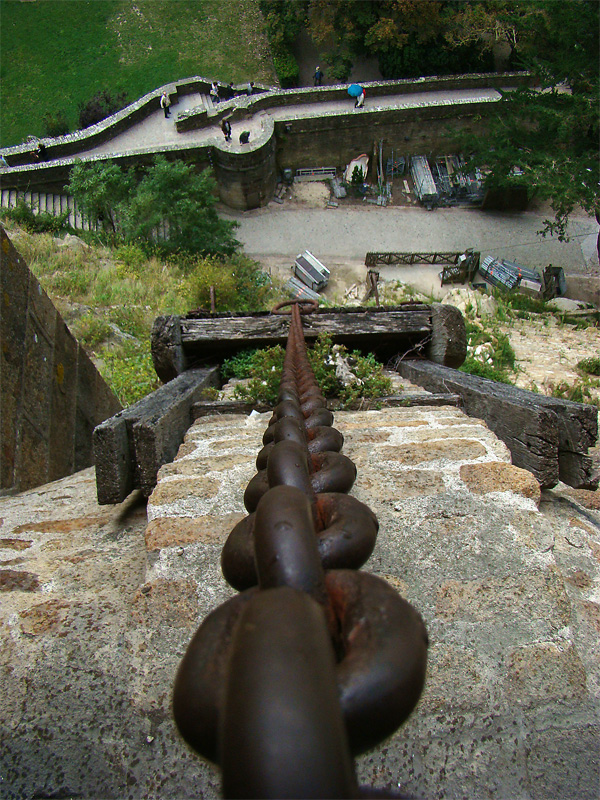
Outside view of the windlass

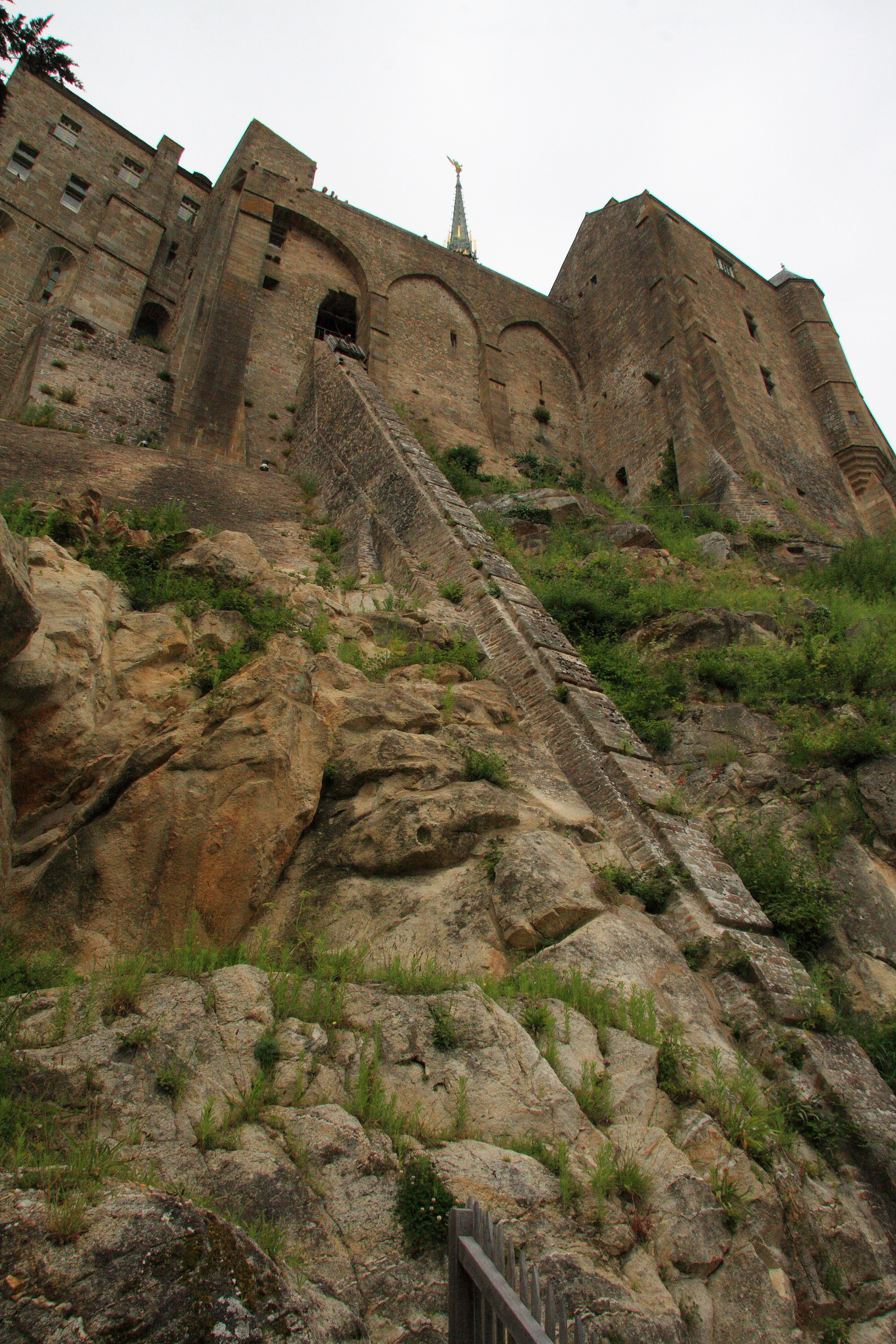
Ramp for the windlass

In the remains of the infirmary, that collapsed in 1811, is a mural representation above the door, of the three dead kings, showing three noble men caught in a cemetery by three dead, illustrating how short life is.

==== The "Merveille" ====
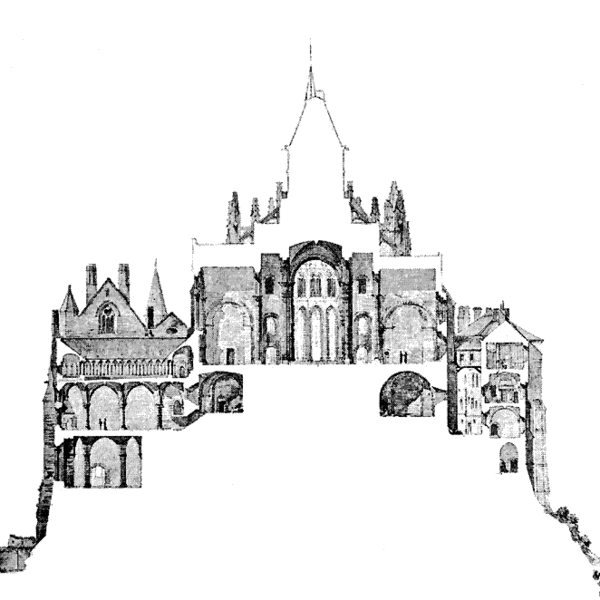
Abbey with the "Merveille" to the left

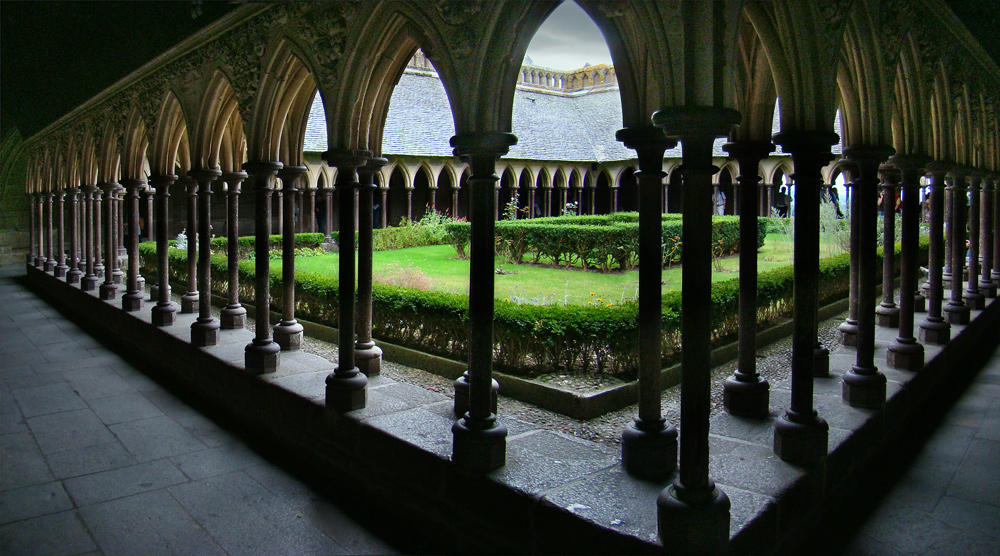
The cloister

The "Merveille", located to the North of the church-abbey, contains a cloister, a dining-hall, a study room and a chaplaincy with an ideal floor plan for going from one to the other.

The local geography played a major role in the design of the "Merveille". The lower-most level, the wine cellar, was constructed with thick robust walls to support the floors above. The distinctive, regularly spaced abutments on the Merveille's outer walls reach to the top to reinforce the structure against any lateral forces imposed by the great weight of its towering upper levels.

The chaplaincy was built during abbot Roger II leadership, when Abbot Raoul des iles led the construction of the hosts room (1215–1217), the dining-hall (1217–1220), the cellar, the knights room (1220–1225) and the cloister (1225–1228).

==== The cloister ====
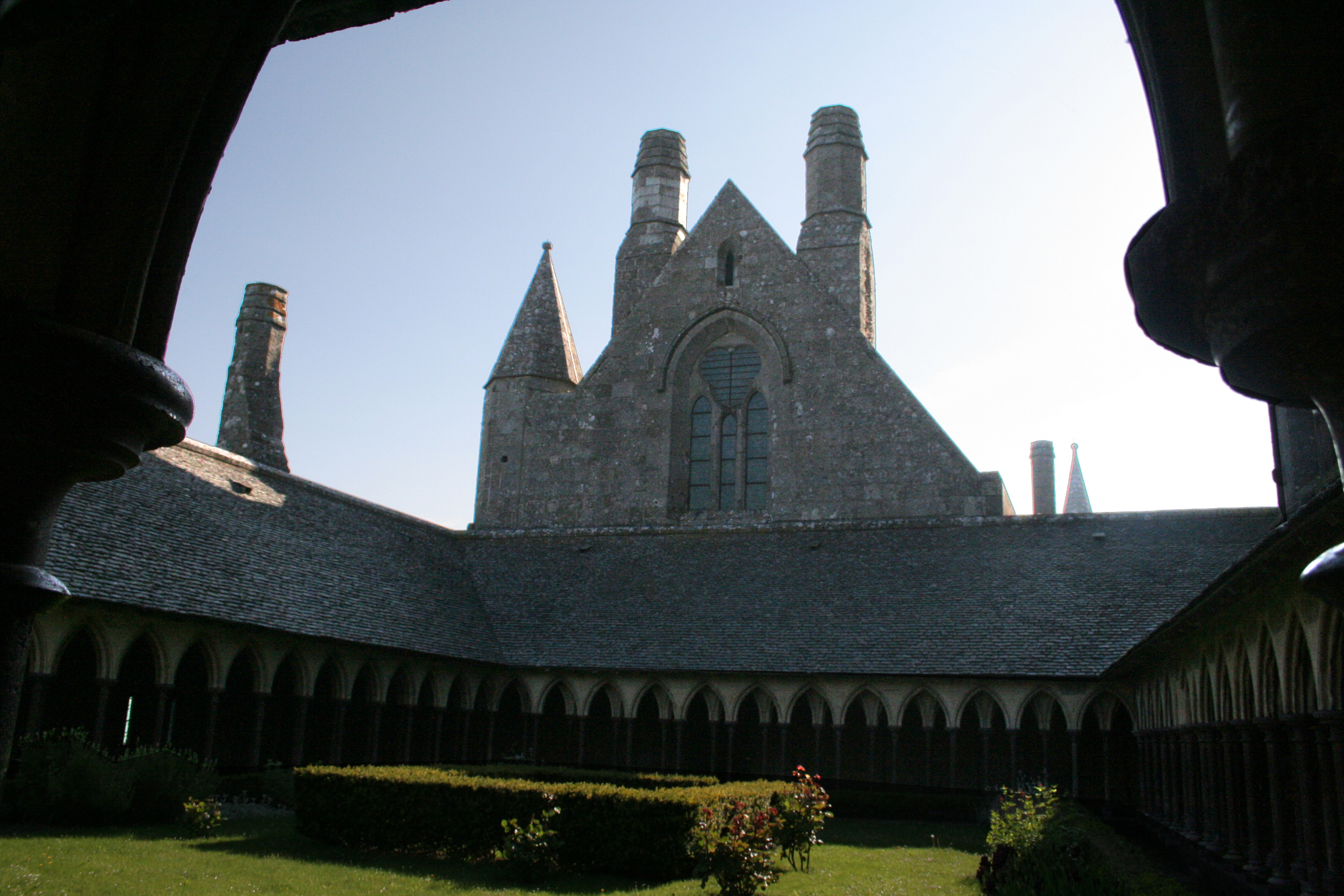
The cloister

Contrary to the tradition, this cloister was not built at the center of the monastery, and thus does not link with all the other buildings. Its function was purely spiritual: to bring the monks to meditate.

Three arches of the cloister are opened to the sea or to the outside. Those openings were the entryway to the chapter house that was never built. The columns, arranged in quincunx, were originally made of limestone from England but were later restored using puddingstone from Lucerne.

The cloister has in the middle a medieval garden recreated in 1966 by brother Bruno de Senneville, a Benedictine monk. The center is made of box tree surrounded by 13 Damascus roses. The squares of medicinal plants, aromatic herbs and flowers symbolize the daily needs of middle-age monks. In the middle of the box trees were monsters to remind that in the middle of any marvel, evil could still be there.

==== The "Belle Chaise" room and the Southwest buildings ====
The "Belle Chaise" building and the lodging wing hosted the administrative section of the abbey. Abbot Richard Turstin built, on the east side, the Guards room (that became the abbey entrance) and a new officiality, where judicial decisions were made (1257).

Around 1393, the two Châtelet towers were built, then the Perrine tower and a "Bailliverie". Later, under abbot Pierre Le Roy, a lodging wing was added, adding at the same time to the abbey fortifications.

=== The city ===
A fortified wall surrounds the city, located on the South and East side of the mont. Two bombards, left by the English during the Hundred Years' War, are visible near one of the fortification doors.

== Heraldry ==
Coat of arms of Mont Saint-Michel abbey	The coat of arms of Mont Saint-Michel abbey.

== Modern pilgrimage ==
During the medieval period, pilgrims visiting the abbey walked from Italy, Germany, and England as well as other parts of France. Such devotees were known as Miquelots. Modern pilgrims can follow the same routes. Ten hiking trails have been created that enable pilgrims from various European countries to retrace the path their ancestors may have taken during a medieval pilgrimage.

== See also ==
- Mont-Saint-Michel in Normandy, France
- Sacra di San Michele in Italy
- St Michael's Mount in Cornwall, United Kingdom
