= Pierre-Marie Delfieux =

French Catholic priest (1934–2013)

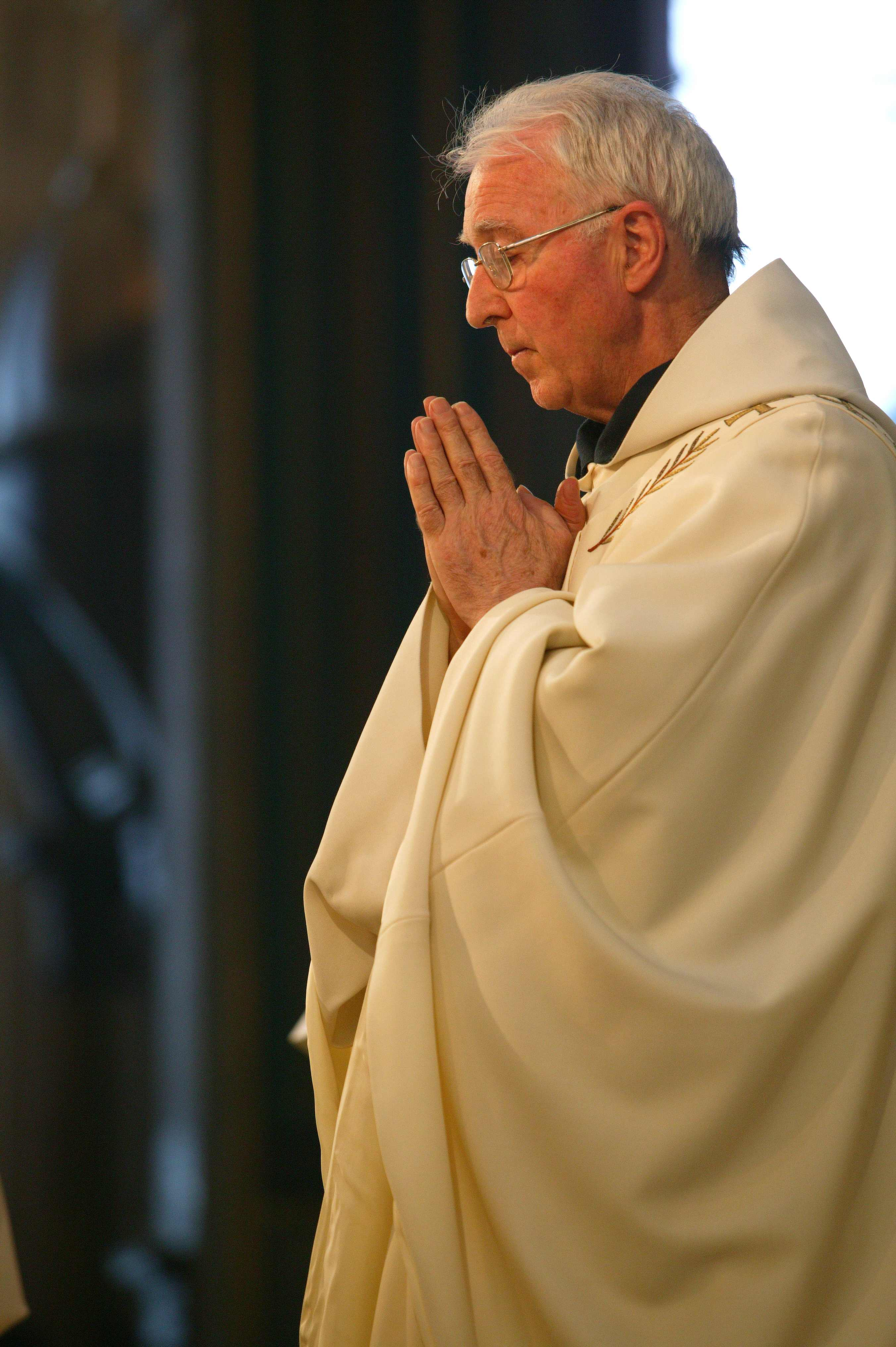
Pierre-Marie Delfieux

Pierre-Marie Delfieux (born 4 December 1934 – 21 February 2013) was a French priest and founder of the Monastic Fraternities of Jerusalem.

== Childhood ==
Pierre Delfieux was born in Campuac on 4 December 1934, the third of six children in a Christian family. He made his first communion at the age of six and from then on took communion every day of his life.

When he was eleven, he became a boarding pupil at the College of the Immaculate Conception in Espalion. In his final year, during a retreat at a Marian center he decided to become a priest. After completing his baccalaureate, he entered the Grand Séminaire de Rodez. He finished his theology studies at the Catholic University of Toulouse and then studied philosophy and social sciences at the Sorbonne.

== Young adulthood ==
After two years of military service in Madagascar, where he taught in a Jesuit college, he was ordained a priest in the Rodez cathedral on 29 June 1961, and remained there for a few years as curate.

In 1965, at the request of Jean-Marie Lustiger, then an official of the Archdiocese of Paris, he became chaplain of language students at the Sorbonne where he worked alongside Jacques Perrier, Francis Deniau and Guy Gaucher.

During this time, he organised pilgrimages to Chartres, and also further afield to Italy, Spain, and the Holy Land. In the Holy Land he discovered the spiritual value of walking in the footsteps of Jesus. He became very attached to the Holy Land, and continued to lead pilgrimages there right up to April 2012, when he was already terminally ill. In the 1960s, he also discovered the desert and was known, at the Richelieu Center, for organising camel rides in the Sahara Desert, to Tamanrasset and other places associated with Charles de Foucauld.

After seven years in this ministry, and marked by the events of May 68, he was offered a sabbatical year. Attracted by the call of the desert, he left first for Beni Abbes, where he lived with a community of the Little Brothers of Jesus, who at that time lived in Assekrem, in the Hoggar massif. He then built a hermitage with his own hands, which he named Bethlehem. He spent one year there alone, then a second with Brother Jean-Marie. Other than that, the Bible and the Blessed Sacrament were his only company. In June 1974, he left Assekrem and, on his return to Paris, discussed his desire to become a monk and found a monastic community "in the heart of the city" with Cardinal François Marty, Archbishop of Paris.

== The Monastic Fraternities of Jerusalem ==
Marty entrusted the church of Saint-Gervais to him for this purpose. Pierre-Marie Delfieux devoted the first year to clarifying the details of his project and began to bring together others who were interested in it. From the outset, he laid down certain essentials: it would be a life faithful to monastic tradition, professing the three vows of poverty, chastity, and obedience and adapted to the realities of the post-conciliar Church and of contemporary society. The emphasis would be on personal and community prayer, with the Daily Office sung in a church that would be open to all. Community life would be fundamental, but it would be lived "in the heart of the city", and always in rented accommodation like most other city dwellers. The members of the community would engage in work, usually as part-time employees, again to show solidarity with other city dwellers. The brothers thus want to stand in solidarity with the townspeople around them, but also in protest, to affirm the primacy of love and prayer.

The first liturgy was sung by a dozen brothers in the church of Saint-Gervais, on All Saints' Day, 1 November 1975. This date was chosen because, as Pierre-Marie Delfieux, now Brother Pierre-Marie, explained, "Our adventure is to become holy (French: "saint") or nothing at all". From then on, the life of Brother Pierre-Marie, became inseparable from the Fraternity of which he was prior until 2012.

A parallel fraternity of nuns was founded on 8 December 1976. The brothers and sisters sing the Daily Office together, but live separately and are governed independently. In 1978-1979 the Fraternities received the official name of "the Monastic Fraternities of Jerusalem" after the city in which Christ died and rose again, in which the Christian Church was born, which is considered a Holy City by the three monotheistic religions, and which, according to the Book of Revelation, will be our abode for eternity.

At the end of a long process of drafting and approval by the Congregations of Consecrated Life and of the Doctrine of the Faith, the Constitutions of the monastic fraternities of Jerusalem were approved by Cardinal Lustiger on 31 May 1996. In the elections which followed this canonical recognition, Brother Pierre-Marie was elected prior general, and re-elected for a second term in 2003.

== Other Foundations ==
In 1979, the Brother Pierre-Marie attempted to found a daughter-house in Marseille at the request of Cardinal Roger Etchegaray, but it did not survive long. The Magdala retreat house was founded at Ferté-Imbault (Sologne) in 1985. But It was not until the turn of the millennium that the number of fraternities exploded into life, with foundations in Vézelay (1993), Strasbourg (1995), Tarbes (1995), Florence (1998), Mont-Saint-Michel (2001), Brussels (2001), Pistoia (2001), Montreal (2004), Rome (2006), Cologne (2009), Warsaw (2010), Mont Saint-Hilaire (2016), and Gamogna (YEAR?). The foundations are always made at the request of a diocesan bishop. By 2019, these communities were composed of nearly 180 monks and nuns from about twenty-five different countries.

== Other activities ==
Brother Pierre-Marie also edited the journal "Sources Vives" and installed a number new stained glass windows in the church of St Gervais over a period of twenty years.

== Death ==
He was taken ill at the end of 2011 and died on 21 February 2013 at Magdala in La Ferté-Imbault.

== Accusations ==
In a book published in November 2019, Anne Mardon, a former sister of the monastic Fraternities of Jerusalem, alleged she suffered psychological and spiritual trauma from Pierre-Marie Delfieux, leading the leaders of the Fraternity to set up a national listening cell to find out if there were other victims. In October 2020, Anne Mardon testified before the independent commission on sexual abuse in the Church.
