= Saint-Gervais-Saint-Protais =

Church of Saint-Gervais-Saint-Protais
- Église Saint-Gervais-Saint-Protais
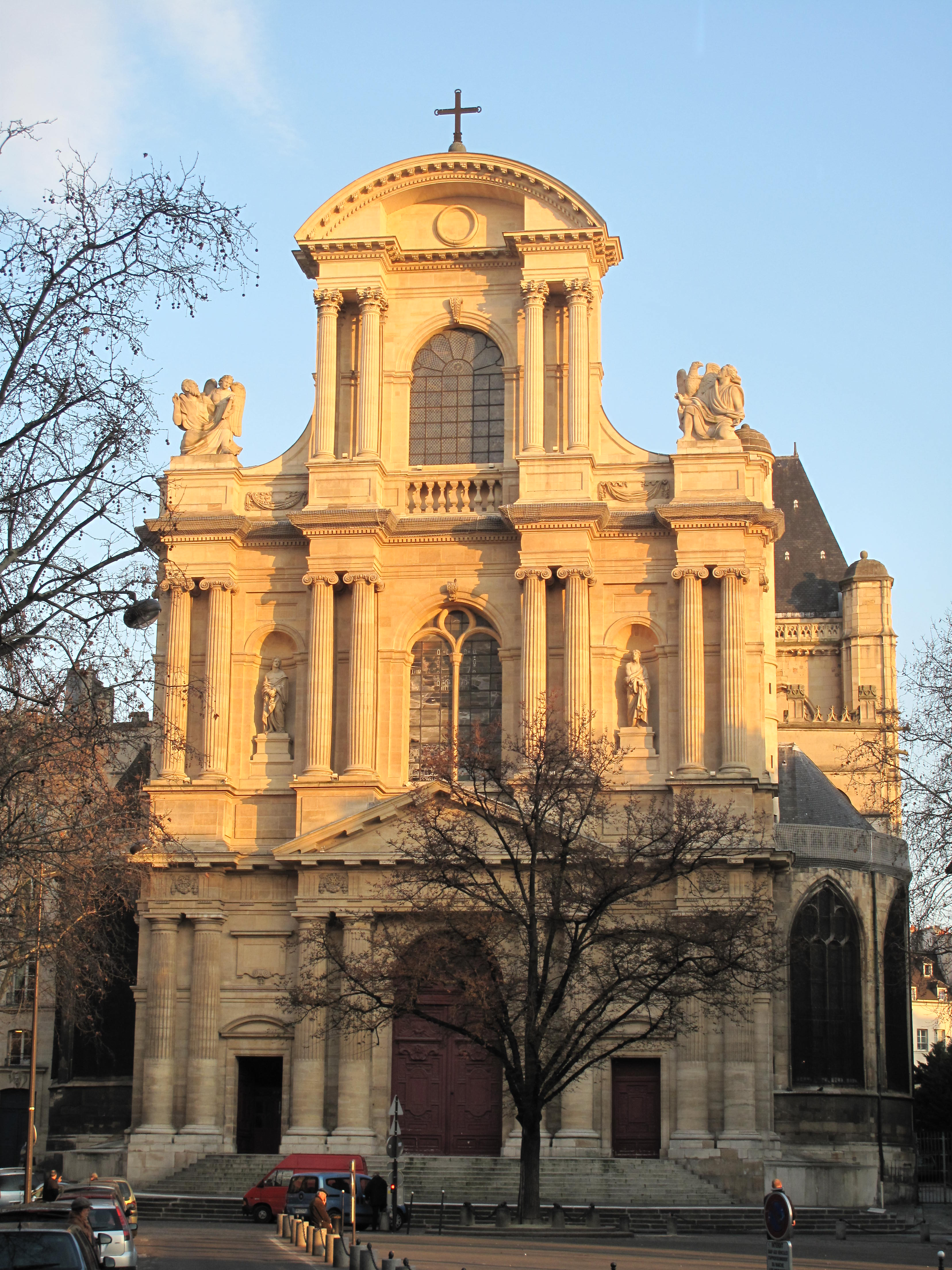
- Façade of the Saint-Gervais-Saint-Protais
- Church of Saint-Gervais-Saint-Protais
- 48°51′20″N 2°21′16″E
- Location: 4th arrondissement of Paris
- Country: France
- Denomination: Roman Catholic Church

Architecture
- Style: French Baroque (the entrance façade and a few other elements) and Gothic

Saint-Gervais-Saint-Protais (French pronunciation: [sɛ̃ ʒɛʁvɛ sɛ̃ pʁɔtɛ]) is a Roman Catholic parish church located in the 4th arrondissement of Paris, on Place Saint-Gervais in the Marais district, east of City Hall (Hôtel de Ville). The current church was built between 1494 and 1657, on the site of two earlier churches; the facade, completed last, was the first example of the French baroque style in Paris. The organists of the church included Louis Couperin and his nephew François Couperin, two of the most celebrated composers and musicians of the Baroque period; the organ they used can still be seen today. The church contains remarkable examples of medieval carved choir stalls, stained glass from the 16th century, 17th century sculpture, and modern stained glass by Sylvie Gaudin and Claude Courageux. Saint-Gervais was a parish church until 1975, when it became the headquarters of the Monastic Fraternities of Jerusalem.

== History ==
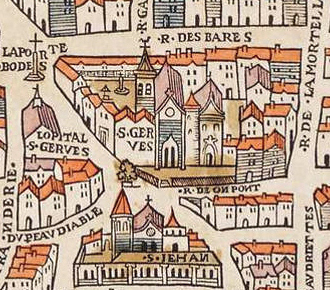
The church in 1550

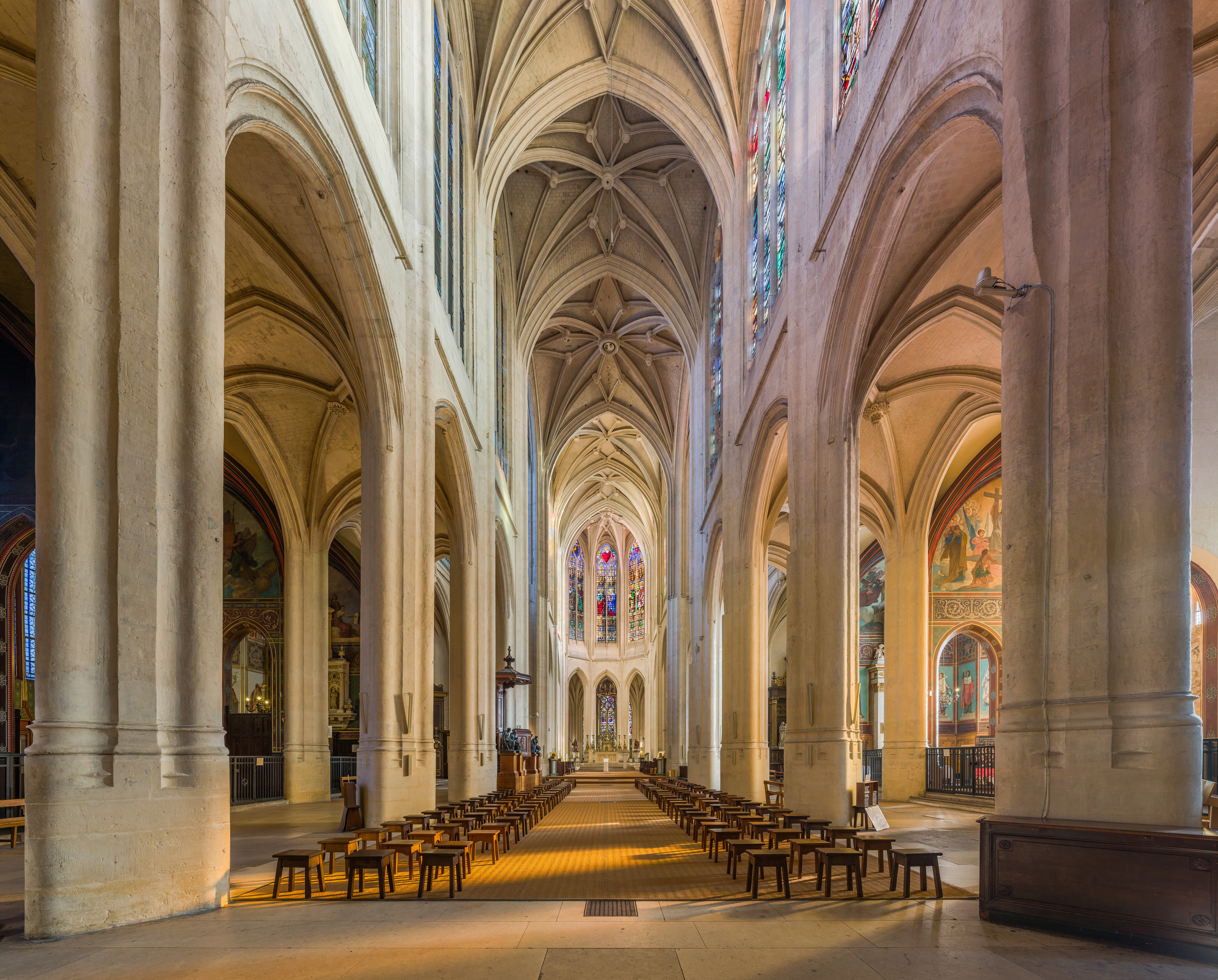
Interior of the Church of Saint-Gervais-Saint-Protais

A church dedicated to Saints Gervasius and Protasius, two Christian martyrs from Milan, is recorded as existing on the site in the 7th century, making it one of the first parish churches on the right bank in Paris. It was attended mostly by boatmen and fishermen, because it was close to the river port at the Place de Grève. It was built on a slight hill, the Monceau Saint-Gervais, to be safe from the floods of the Seine. After the completion of the wall of Philippe-Auguste, built between 1190 and 1209, the neighborhood was protected against attack and the population began to grow. The church had come under the sponsorship of several of the important confreries or guilds of Paris, including the wine-merchants. With their financial help, a larger church was built on the site in the early 13th century.

Construction of the present church began in 1494, but was delayed by the Wars of religion and by a shortage of funds. It was begun in the Gothic style; the chapels of the apse were finished in 1530 and the transept in 1578. While the interior of the church was largely Gothic, the facade was built in an original new style, the French Baroque, on a plan by architect Salomon de Brosse (1571–1626). The first stone of the facade was placed by the young King Louis XIII in 1616. Between 1600 and 1628, a second row of chapels was built on the north side including the golden chapel ornamented with painted woodwork.

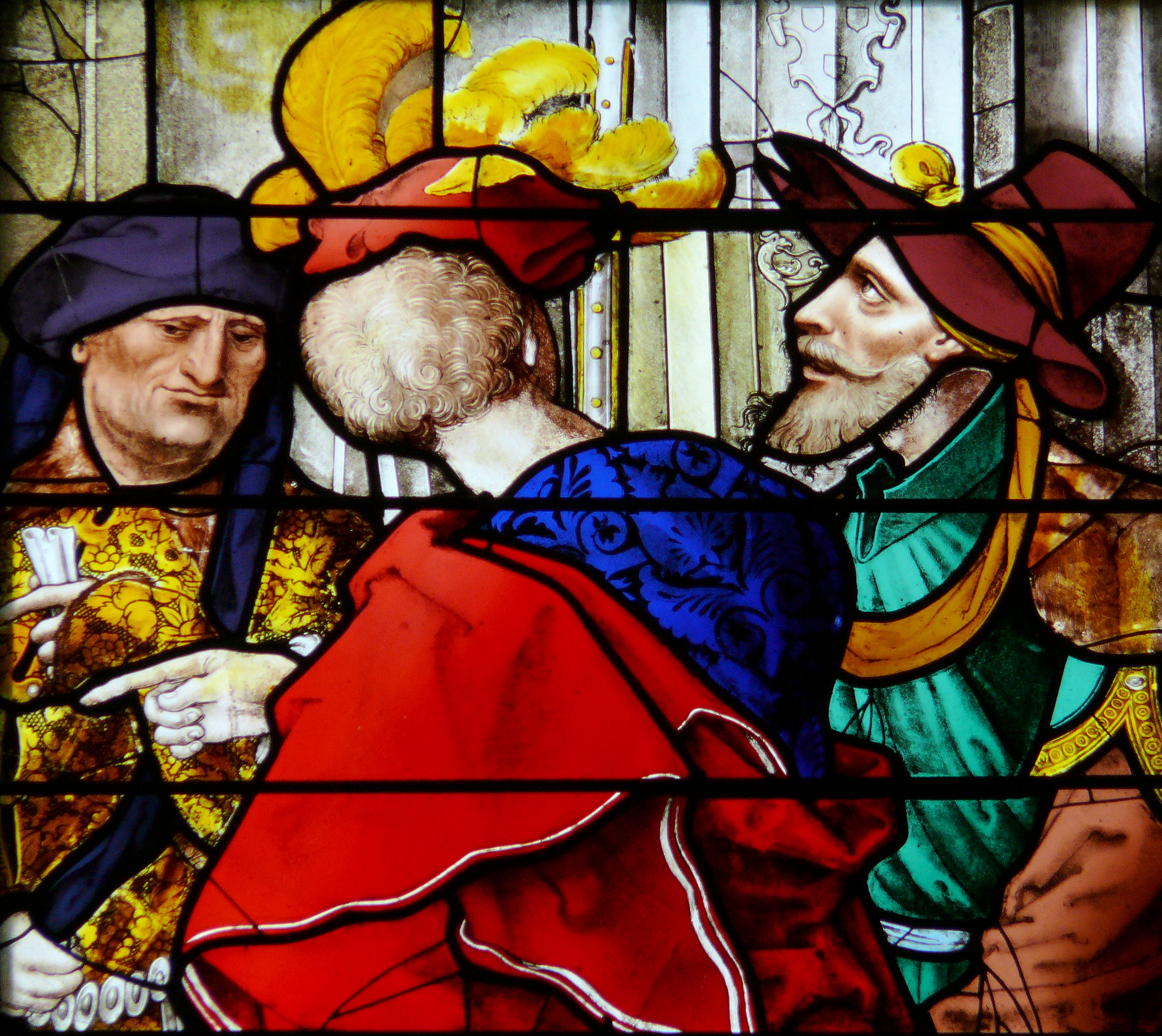
Detail of stained glass by Jean Chastellain, "The Wisdom of Solomon" (1533)

During the 17th and 18th century the church was attended by many members of the aristocratic families who lived in the Marais, including Marie de Rabutin-Chantal, marquise de Sévigné, and the Chancellor of Louis XIV, Michel Le Tellier, whose funeral monument is found in the church.

Beginning in 1653, the church employed and sheltered the Couperin family, one of the most famous dynasties of French musicians, for more than two centuries. On one side of the church, the home of the celebrated harpsichordists, organists, and composers still stands, with a plaque commemorating the Couperins' tenure. The organ used by Louis and François Couperin still exists today inside the church; it was built by the most famous organ builders of the time, François-Henri Clicquot, Louis-Alexandre Clicquot, and Robert Clicquot.

In the 18th century, the facade of the church was greatly admired, though it was nearly blocked from view by a row of houses. Voltaire wrote, "It is a masterpiece which is lacking nothing except a place from which to see it." The houses blocking the view were finally demolished in 1854, opening up the view of the facade.

During the French Revolution, the church was emptied of many of its treasures and turned into a Temple of Reason and Youth, before being returned to the Church in 1802.

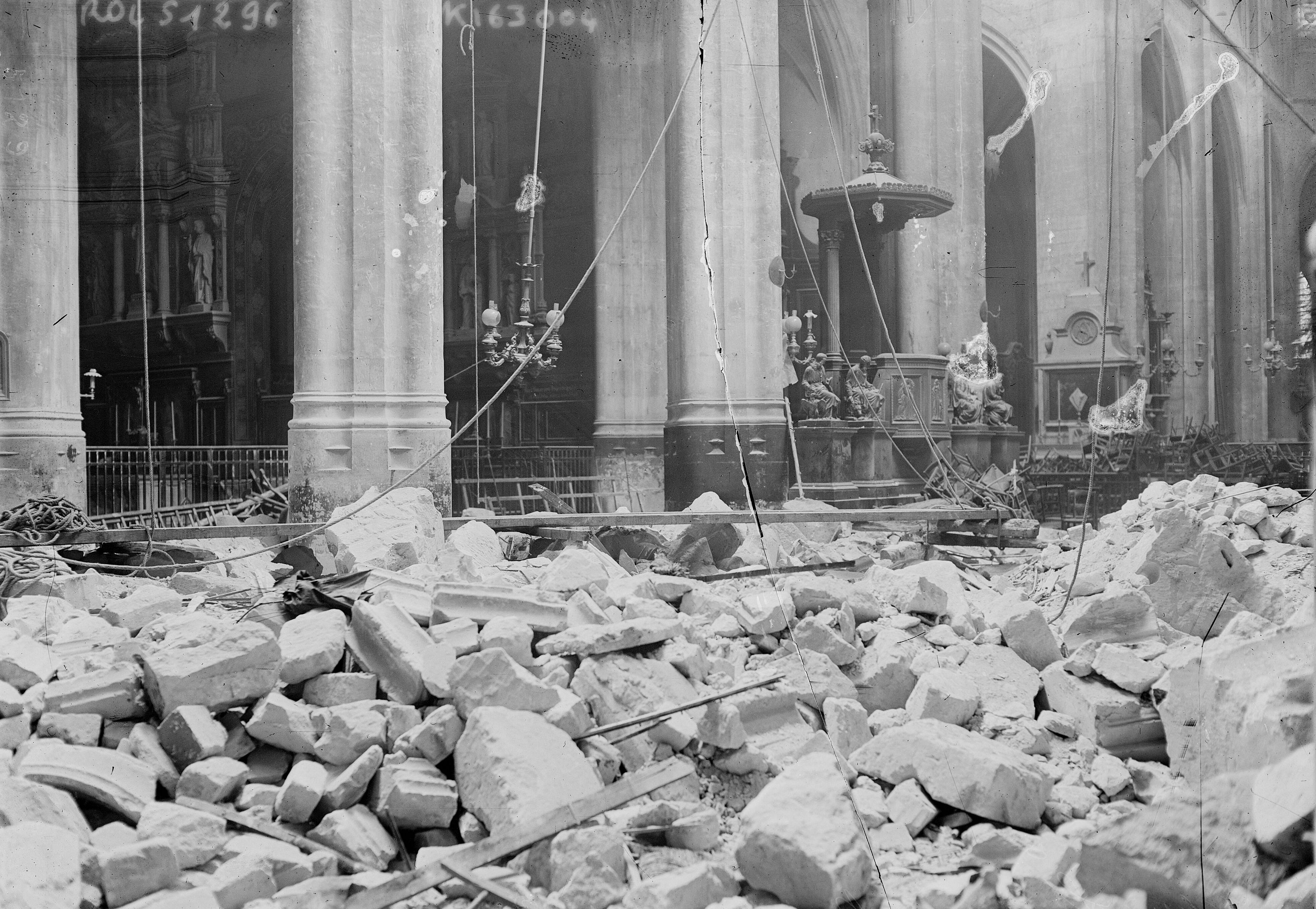
A German shell struck the church in 1918, killing 91 people

On 29 March 1918 during World War I, a German shell, fired by the long-range "Paris Gun", fell on the church, killing 91 people and wounding 68 others; the explosion collapsed the roof when a Good Friday service was in progress. This was the worst single incident involving a loss of civilian lives during the German bombardment of Paris in 1918.

In 1975 the church became the headquarters of the Monastic Fraternities of Jerusalem, founded in that same year by Père Pierre-Marie Delfieux with the authorisation of the then Archbishop of Paris, François Marty. The order is devoted to carrying on monastic life in an urban context; most of its members work part-time in civil occupations. The church is known for its distinctive and ecumenical liturgy; for example, adopting Lutheran hymn music and Orthodox troparia. The order has founded several other communities in France, at Mont St. Michel, Vezelay, and Magdala Sologne and elsewhere in Europe, in Florence, Brussels, Cologne, Warsaw, and Montreal.

Five new stained glass windows by Sylvie Gaudin were added to the southwest chevet of the church in 1993–95. Another series of six windows by Claude Courageux was added in the early 2000s in the upper level of the church, in the south nave, the transept and the choir, replacing those destroyed over the centuries.

== Facade ==
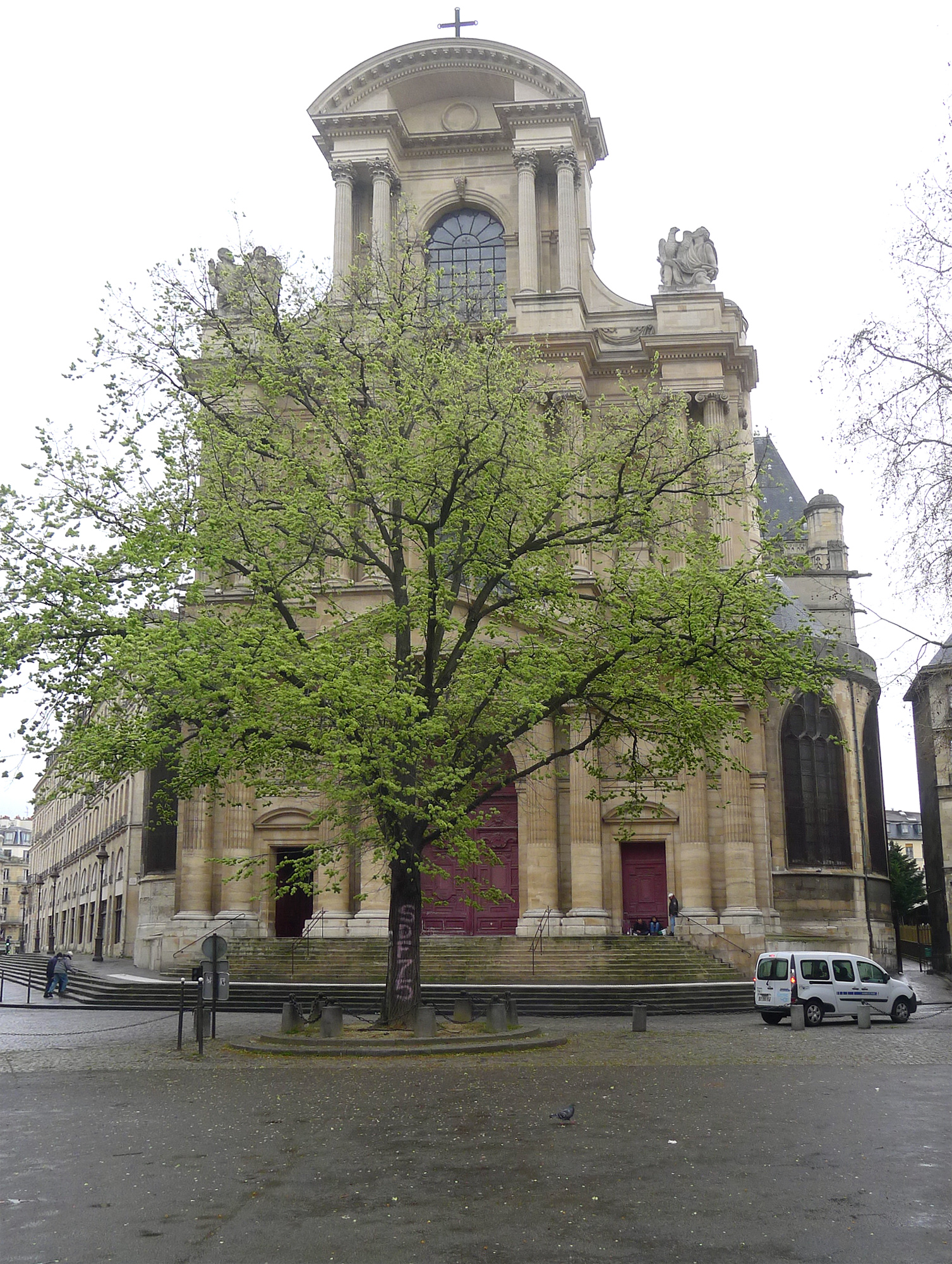
The elm in front of the church

The facade of the church was begun in 1616, well after the nave of the church, with the cornerstone laid by Louis XIII. The design was by Salomon de Brosse (1571–1626), whose other major Paris work was the Luxembourg Palace. While the nave of the church was late or flamboyant gothic, the facade introduced an entirely new classical style, which opened the way for the French Baroque. The facade placed the three classical orders of architecture one atop the other. The ground floor featured three bays with pairs of columns with capitals of the simplest Doric order, with a classical pediment. Above this is a level of three bays with columns of the ionic order, and above that is a single bay with paired columns of the Corinthian order, holding up a curved pediment. In order to attach the new facade to the gothic portion of the church, de Brosse designed a traverse and two semicircular chapels on either side of the facade. The facade served as model for other churches in France and Europe, most notably the church of Saint-Paul-Saint-Louis, the church of the Jesuits, not far away in the Marais, which was the first church in Paris built entirely in the new style.

Since the Middle Ages, the Saint-Gervais elm has been planted in front of the church; it served as a meeting place, and a place where disputes were sometimes settled by judges. The trees were replanted regularly over the centuries. Carvings of the trees from earlier centuries are found on the walls of some of the neighboring buildings.

== Nave ==
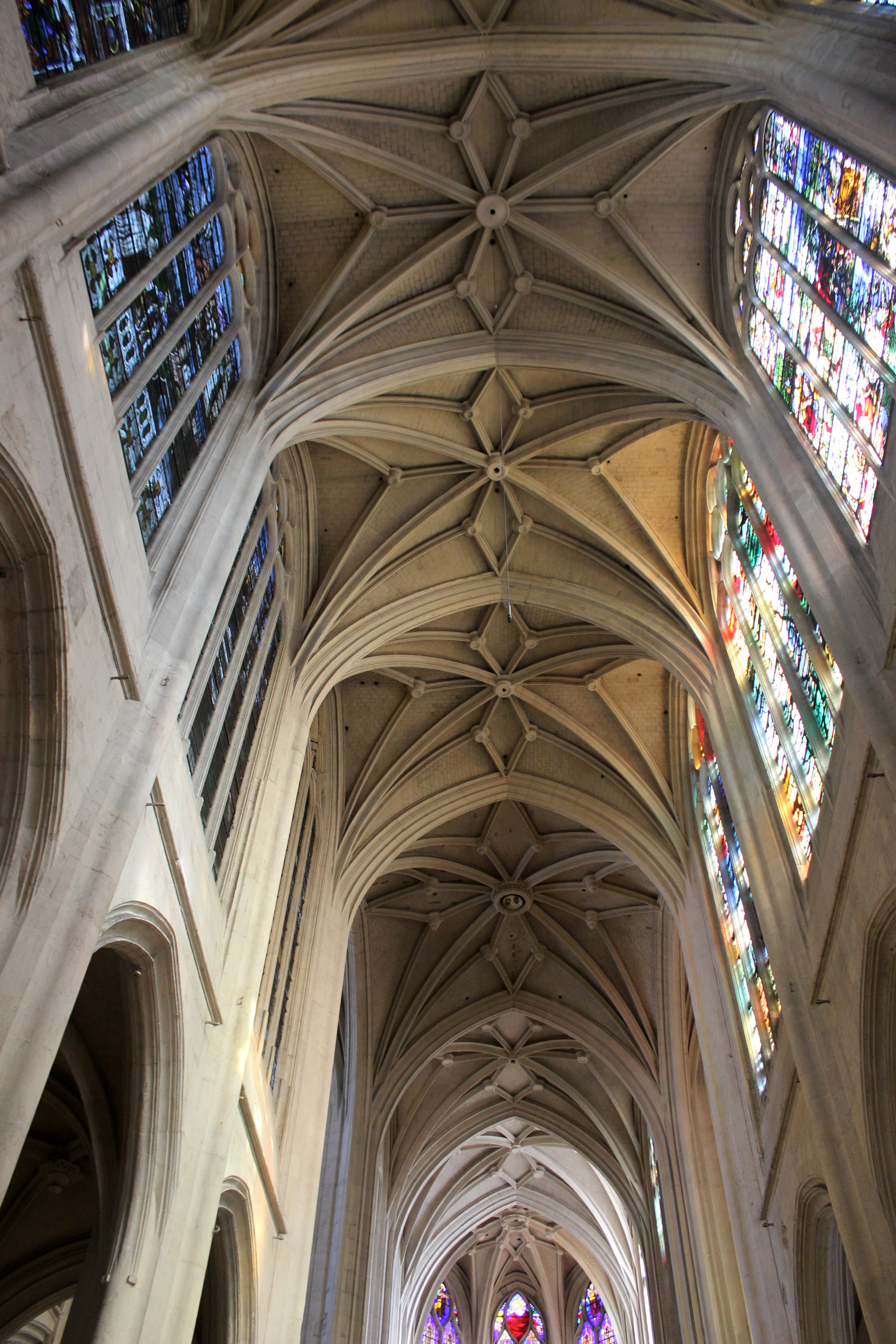
view of the vaulted ceiling of the nave

The nave of the church (1600–1620) is notable for its dramatic height and the simplicity and purity of its lines. While the lower level of the nave is late gothic, the upper level of the nave shows the influence of the Renaissance, with large semi-circular arches containing a series of large stained glass windows, filling the church with light. The upper windows are 21st-century, by Claude Courageux, illustrating the story of Adam and Eve, Noah's ark, and the patriarchs and their spouses. The ceiling of the nave, where the arches of the walls come together in an elaborate embroidery, symbolizes the vaults of heaven.

== Choir stalls ==
The wooden choir stalls (16th–17th century), from the reigns of François I and Henri II, are richly carved with scenes of daily life, the different professions, and grotesque animals. Out of sight from those attending mass, they were designed as a place where the Canons of the church could relax during the service. Some of the figures were too intimate for more puritanical later centuries, and had to be censored, including a carved image of a man and woman bathing together.

== Chapel of the Virgin ==
(See also Chapelle dorée, Paris)

The chapel of the Virgin, at the back of the church, has a dramatic late gothic vaulted ceiling, featuring a hanging crown of stone 2.5 meters in diameter, and abstract designs resembling flames. The room is often used for silent meditation by church visitors. The chapel has some of the oldest stained glass windows in the flamboyant gothic style, made by Jean Chastellain in 1517, illustrating the life of the Virgin Mary. Another remarkable window by Chastellain, "The Judgement of Solomon", made in 1533 in the colorful Renaissance style, is found in a side chapel.

== Painting and sculpture ==
The church contains a number of notable works of art.

- A painting by the Venetian artist Sebastiano Ricci (1659–1734), Saint Gregory the Great and Saint Vital intercede for the souls in Pugatory, located in the Chapel of Saint Philomene. This was brought from Venice to Paris by Napoleon after his Italian campaign.
- The paintings The Beheading of John the Baptist and The Adoration of the Magi by Claude Vignon (1593–1670), located in the Chapel of the Virgin.
- A statue of Christ carved in oak by Antoine-Augustin Préault (1809–1879) in the Chapel of the Virgin.
- Statues from the funeral monument of Michel Le Tellier (1603–1685) the Chancellor of Louis XIV, by Pierre Mazeline (1632–1685) and Simon Hurtelle (1648–1724). The figures include the Chancellor, in prayer; a weeping 'genie' praying at his feet; and two draped figures representing Faith and Religion. Two other figures from the group, Justice and Prudence, are found in the Louvre.

== Gallery ==
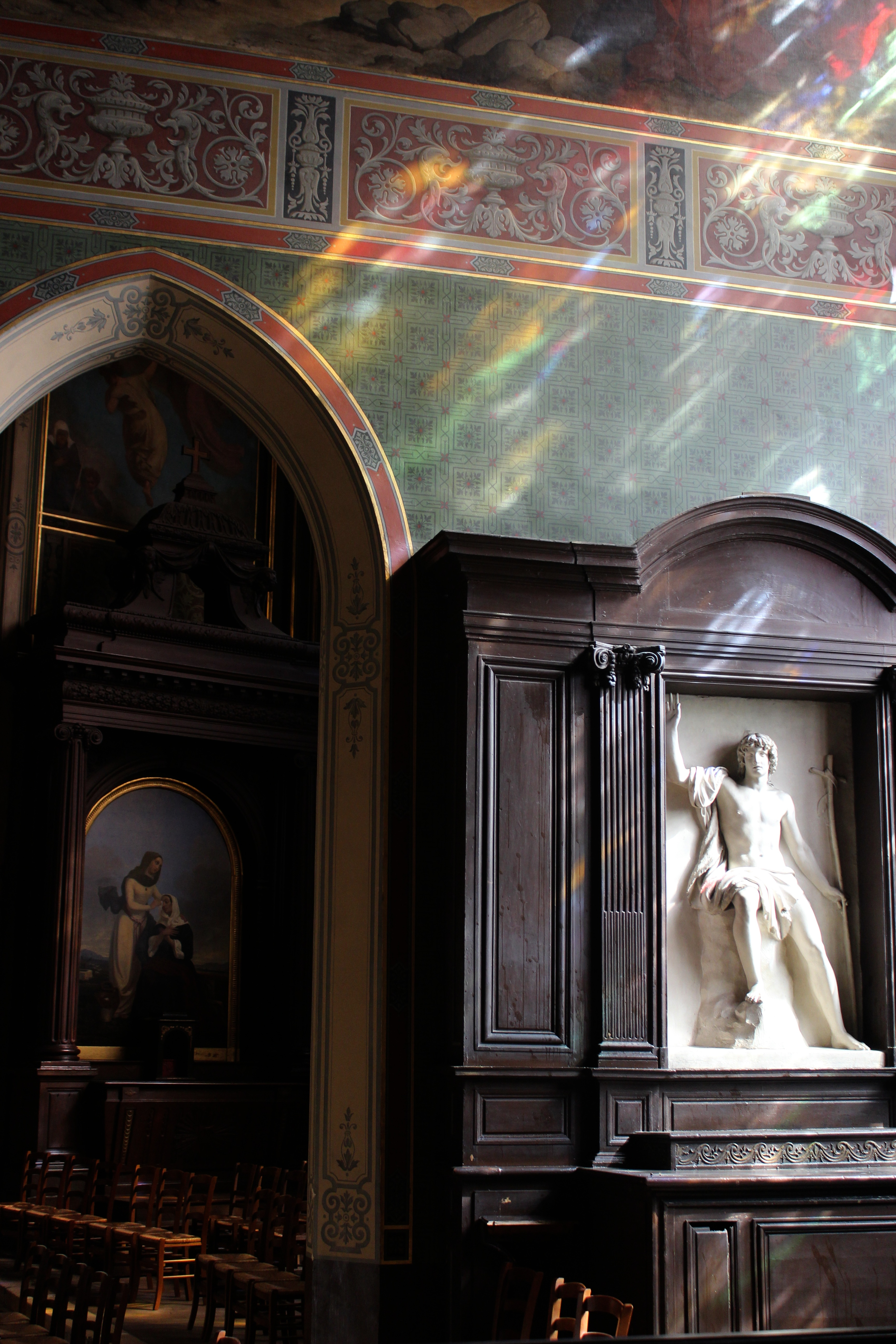
Side chapel

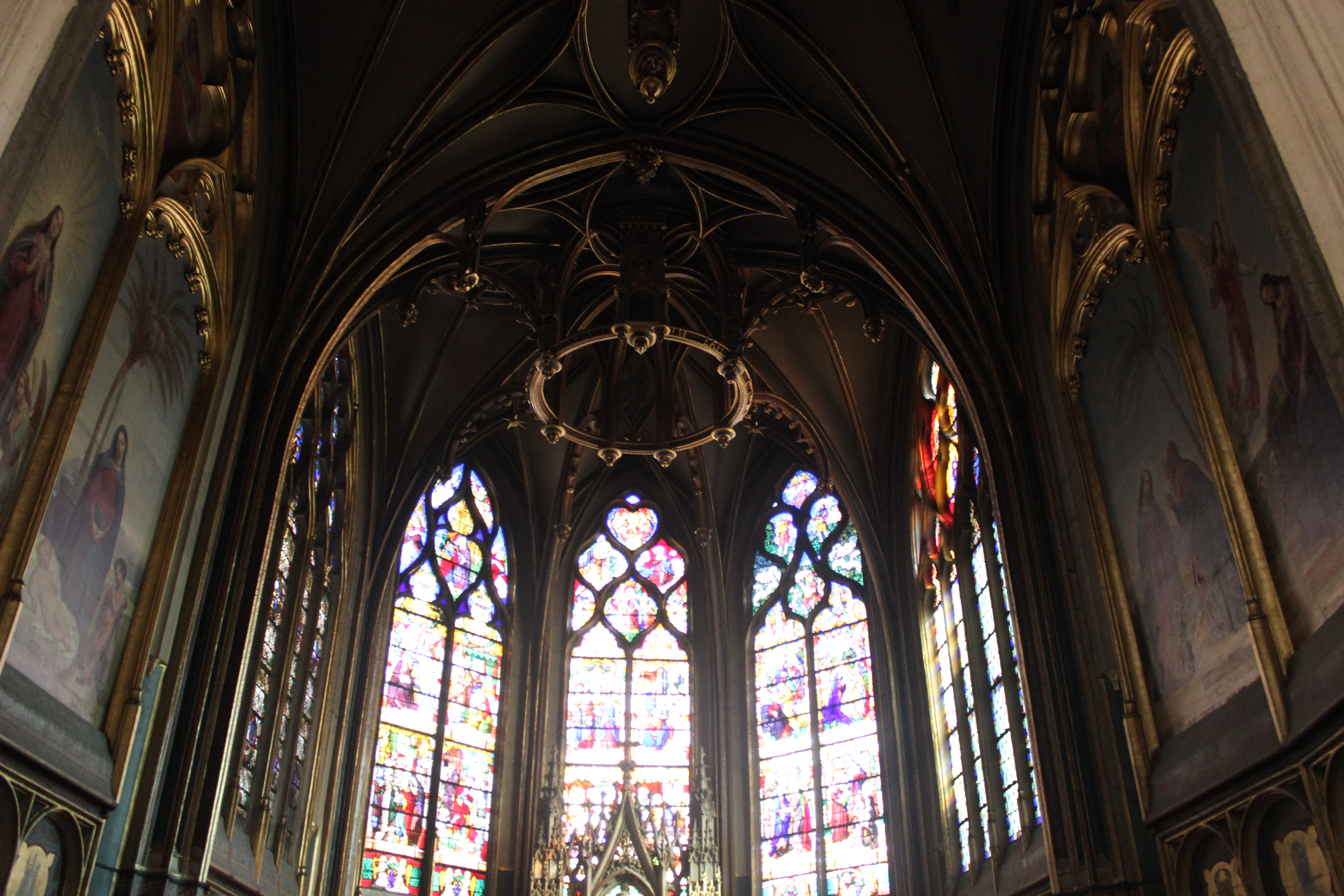
the Chapel of the Virgin

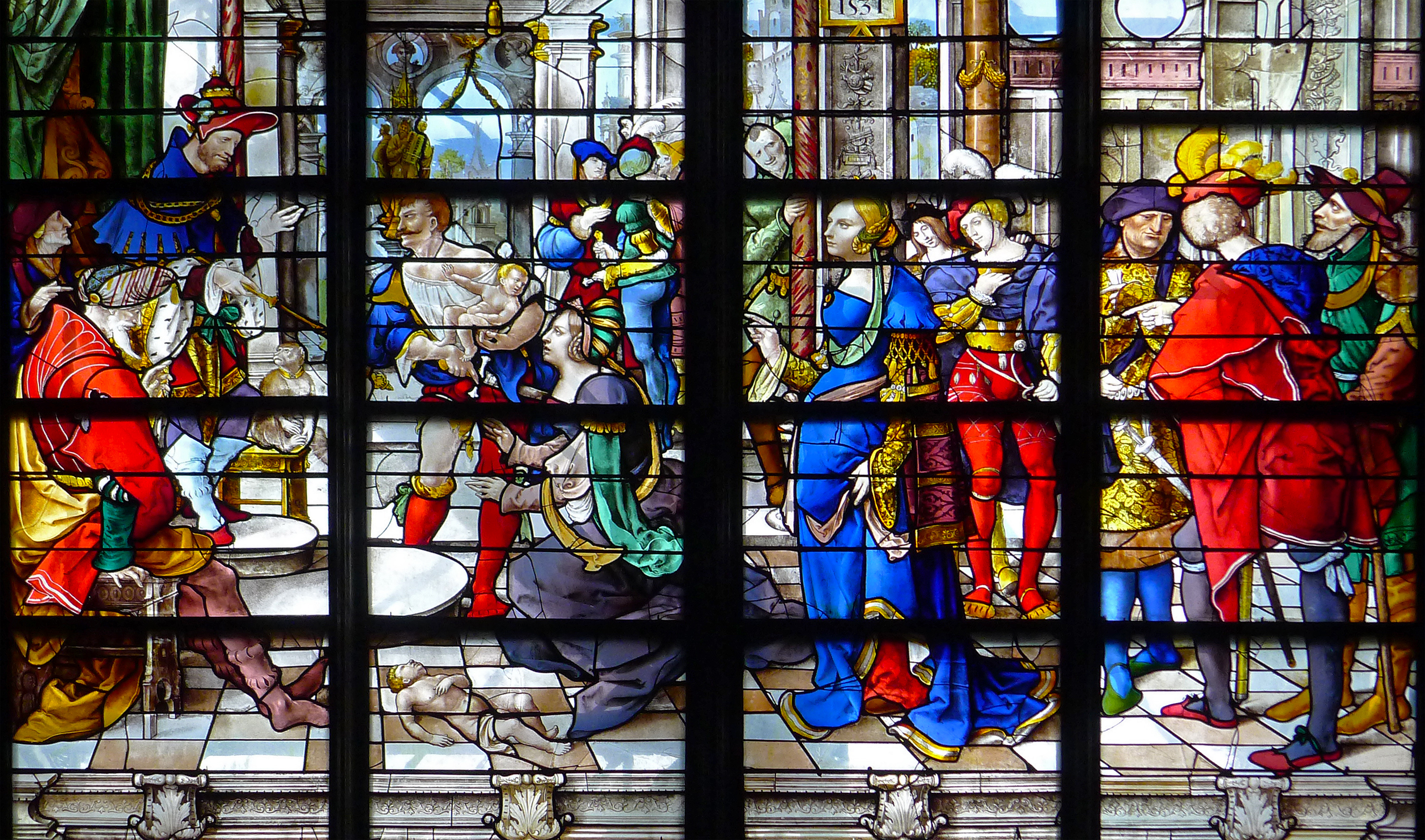
Detail from the Wisdom of Solomon by Jean Chastellain (1533)

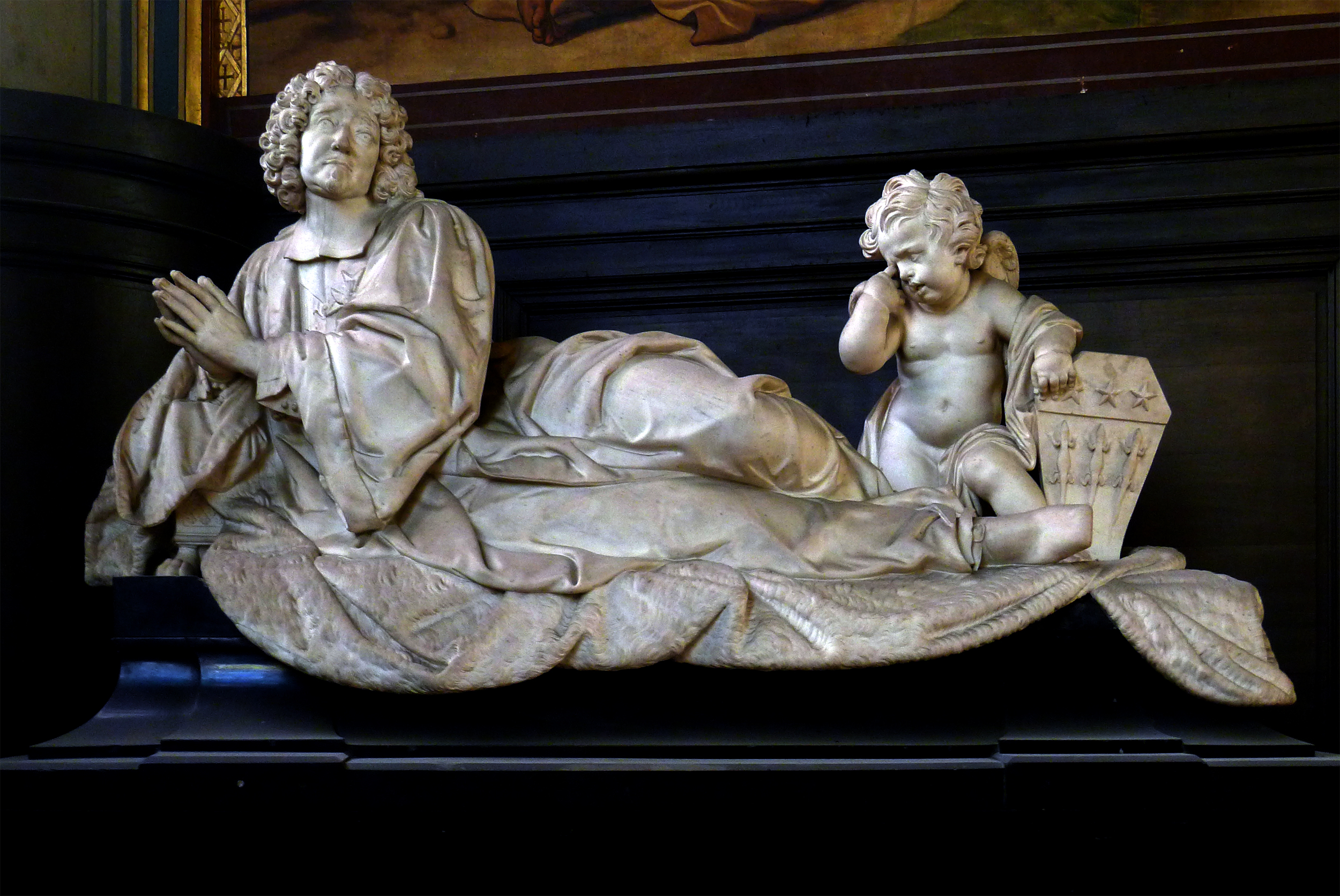
Funeral monument of Michel Le Tellier (1685)

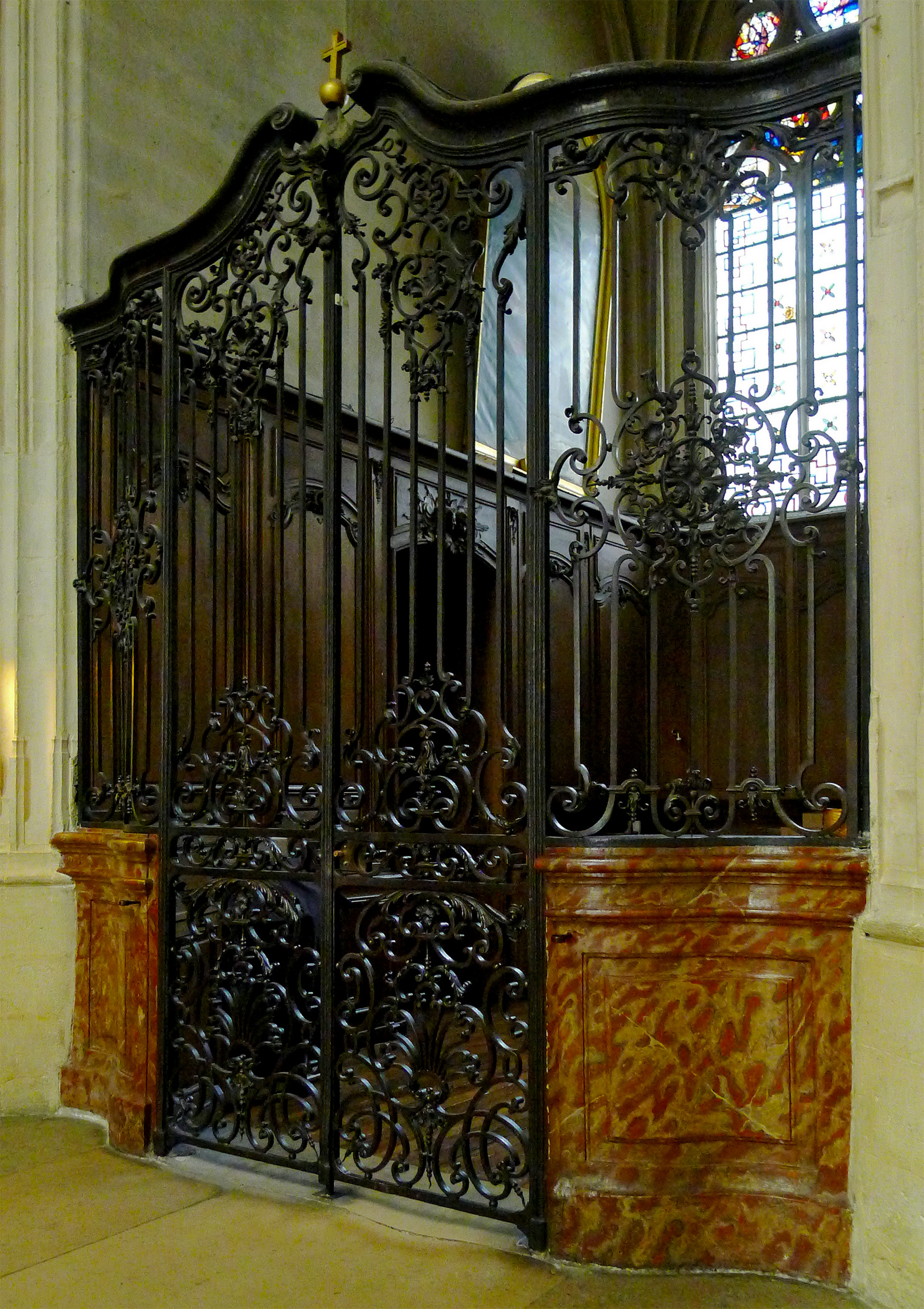
wrought-iron gate to a chapel

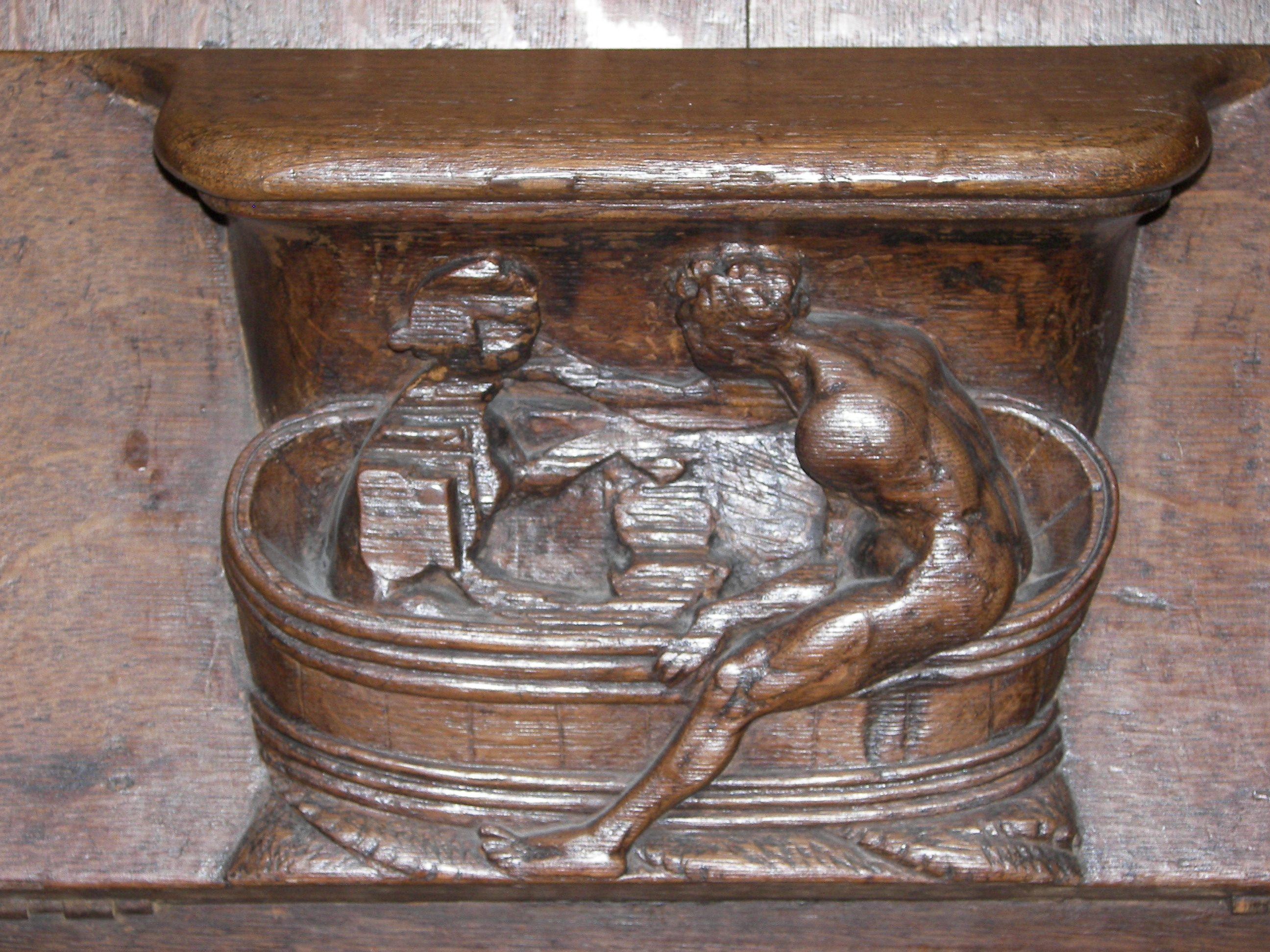
carved bathing scene on a choir stall

== Organ and the Couperin family ==
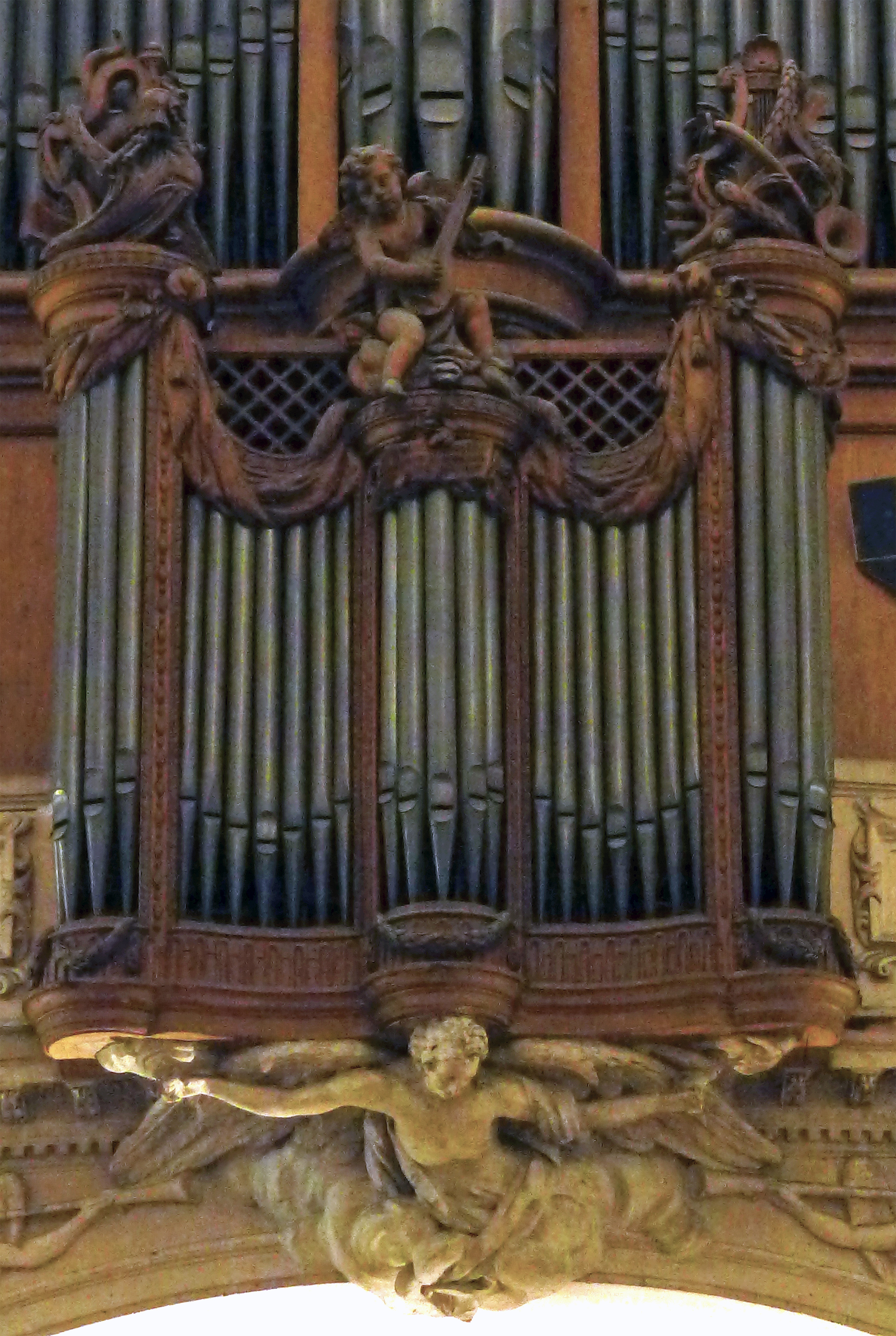
Detail of the tribune of the organ

The church is one of the great shrines of organ music, thanks to the Couperin family; eight members of the family were organists there from 1656 until 1826. They included Louis Couperin (1626–1661) and François Couperin (1668–1733), authors of celebrated masses and other compositions for the instrument. The grand organ of Couperin is still in place on the Tribune above the entrance at the back of the church. The first organ was constructed by Mathis Languhedul of Flanders in 1601; followed by new organ made by the French dynasty of Pierre, Alexandre and François Thierry, between 1649 and 1714; then rebuilt by François-Henri Cliquot in 1769, with many restorations over the following years. The organ itself is a registered historic landmark.

== Access ==
Located near the Metro stations: Hôtel de Ville and Pont Marie.

It is served by lines 1, 7, and 11.

== See also ==
- Paris in the 17th century
- Pierre et Luce
- List of historic churches in Paris

=== Bibliography ===
- Dumoulin, Aline (2010). Églises de Paris. Éditions Massin. ISBN 978-2-7072-0683-1.
- Fierro, Alfred (1996). Histoire et dictionnaire de Paris. Robert Laffont. ISBN 2-221-07862-4.
- L'Église Saint-Gervais. Sources Vives - Fraternités Monastiques de Jérusalem. 2001.
