= Monastic Fraternities of Jerusalem =

Catholic community (founded 1975)

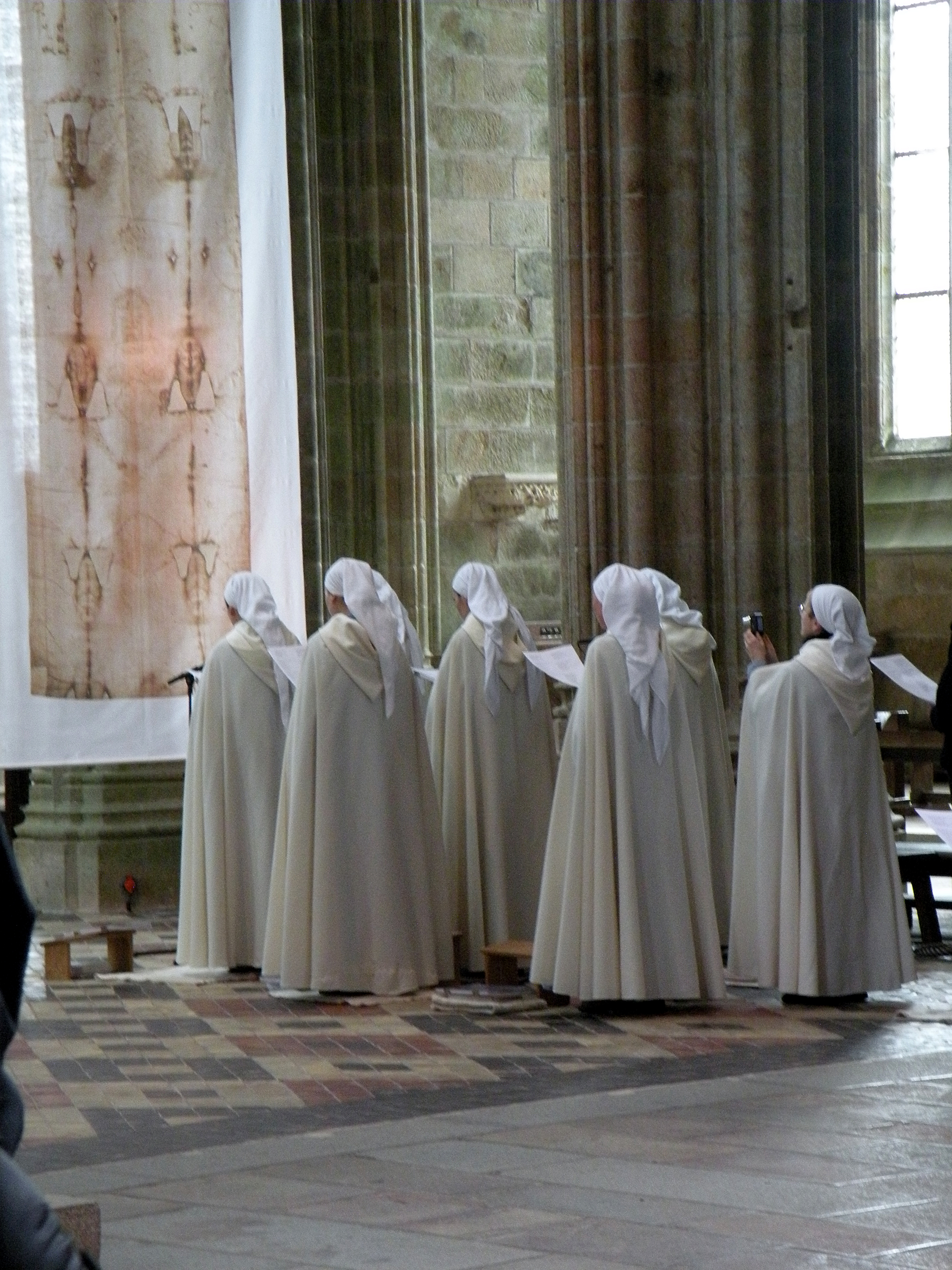
Liturgical service of nuns from the Monastic Fraternities of Jerusalem in the Mont-Saint-Michel Abbey, in France

The Monastic Fraternities of Jerusalem were founded in 1975 by Brother Pierre-Marie Delfieux (died March 2013), until then prior general, with the aim of promoting the spirit of the monastic desert (cf. Charles de Foucauld) in the heart of cities.

In the communities' Rule of Life, Delfieux answers the question: Why Jerusalem? "Because Jerusalem is the city given by God to men and built by men for God, thereby becoming the foremost of the cities of the world, and because your vocation is to be a city-dweller, you are a monk, a nun of Jerusalem. (§161) Be vigilant to keep in your heart a true concern for communion with all the sons of Abraham, Jews and Muslims, who are like you worshippers of the one God and for whom Jerusalem is equally a holy City." (§174)

These Catholic communities are present in

- Belgium: Saint-Gilles (2001- closed Juin 2017)
- Canada: Montréal (2004)
- France: Paris (1975), Vézelay (1993), Strasbourg (1995), Mont-Saint-Michel (2001), La Ferté-Imbault/Indre (département) (Magdala retreat house), Lourdes-Ossun
- Germany: Cologne, Groß St. Martin (2009)
- Italy: Florence, Pistoia, Gamogna (1998), Trinità dei Monti (2006) and then in San Sebastiano in Palatino (2016) in Rome
- Poland: Warsaw (2010)

== See also ==
- Bose Monastic Community
- Catholic religious order
- Monastic Family of Bethlehem, of the Assumption of the Virgin and of Saint Bruno
- New Monasticism related communities
- Order of Watchers (Ordre des Veilleurs), a French Protestant fraternity of hermits
- Book of the First Monks
- Desert Fathers
- Hermit
- Mary of Egypt
- Poustinia

== Sources ==
- The Jerusalem Community Rule of Life (foreword by Carlo Carretto). Paulist Press, 1985. ISBN 0-8091-2712-1.
