= A. T. Sanders Jr. =

American politician (1926–1989)

A. T. "Apple" Sanders Jr.

Louisiana State Representative for East Baton Rouge Parish
- In office 1956–1964
- Preceded by: Two-member delegation: Rolfe H. McCollister Percy E. Roberts
- Succeeded by: Six-member district: William F. "Bill" Bernhard Jr. Luther F. Cole; Carl V. Dawson; Joe Keogh; Eugene McGehee; Lillian W. Walker

Personal details
- Born: November 10, 1926 Mississippi, U.S.
- Died: June 17, 1989 (aged 62) Baton Rouge, Louisiana, U.S.
- Party: Democratic
- Spouse: Gloria P. Sanders
- Children: Albert Taylor "Lil Apple" Sanders III
- Education: Louisiana State University

Albert Taylor "A. T." Sanders Jr. (November 10, 1926 – June 17, 1989), also known as A. T. "Apple" Sanders Jr., was a Democrat who served in the Louisiana House of Representatives from East Baton Rouge Parish from 1956 to 1964.

His father, Albert Sanders Sr., was born in Amite County, Mississippi. Sanders attended Baton Rouge High School and Louisiana State University. Sanders and his wife, Gloria P. Sanders, had a son, Albert Sanders III, known as "Lil Apple".

In 1987, he unsuccessfully sought a political comeback when he challenged Republican State Senator Kenneth Osterberger for reelection in District 16.

Preceded by Two-member delegation: Rolfe H. McCollister; Percy E. Roberts	Louisiana State Representative for East Baton Rouge Parish (alongside Wayne Gaudin, William F. "Bill" Bernhard Jr., Jack Dyer, and Eugene McGehee); 1956–1964	Succeeded by Six-member district: William F. "Bill" Bernhard Jr. Luther F. Cole; Carl V. Dawson; Joe Keogh; Eugene McGehee; Lillian W. Walker
