= Seneschalcy of Armagnac =

French Authority Seat

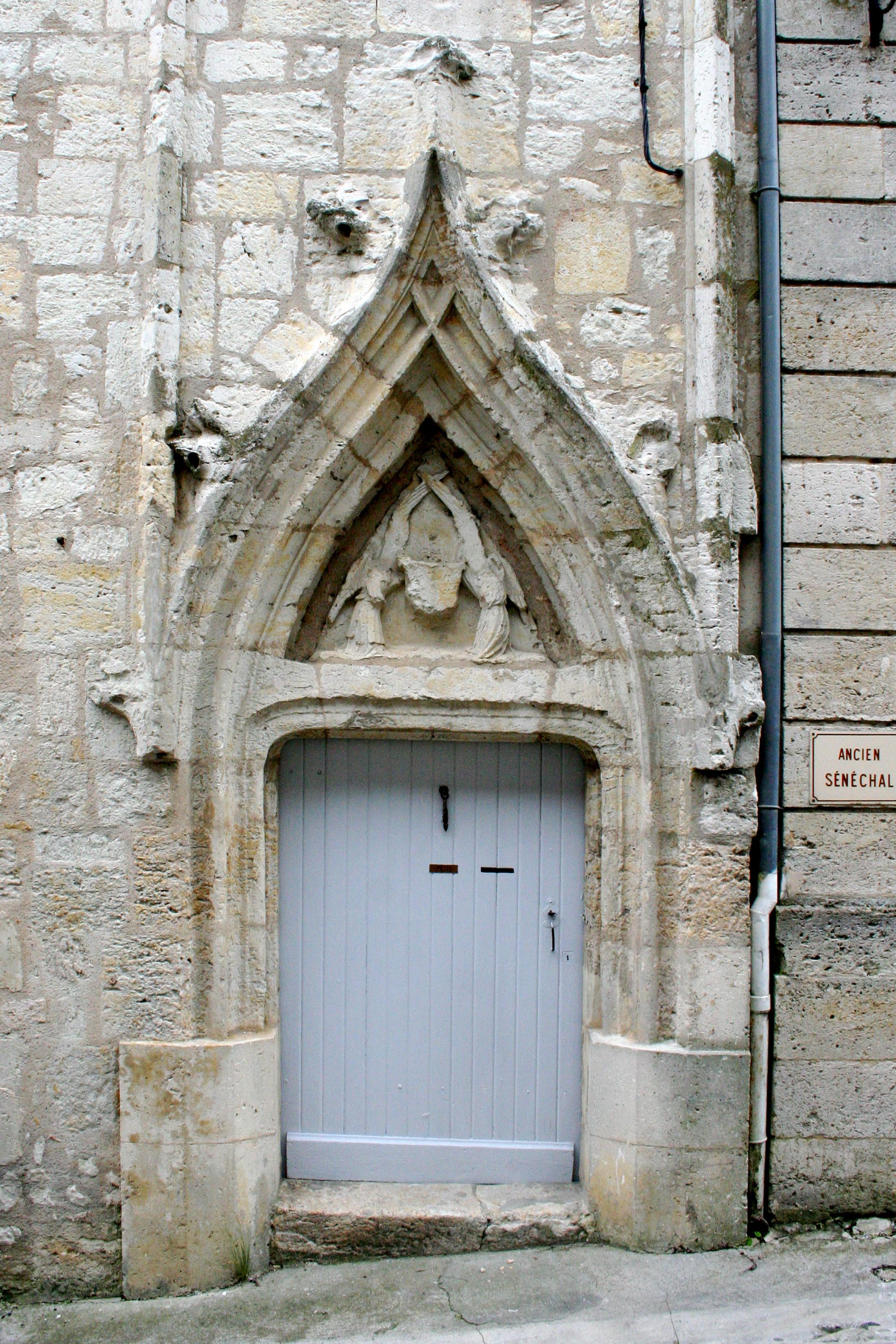
Door to the Seneschaussée (15th c.) in Lectoure

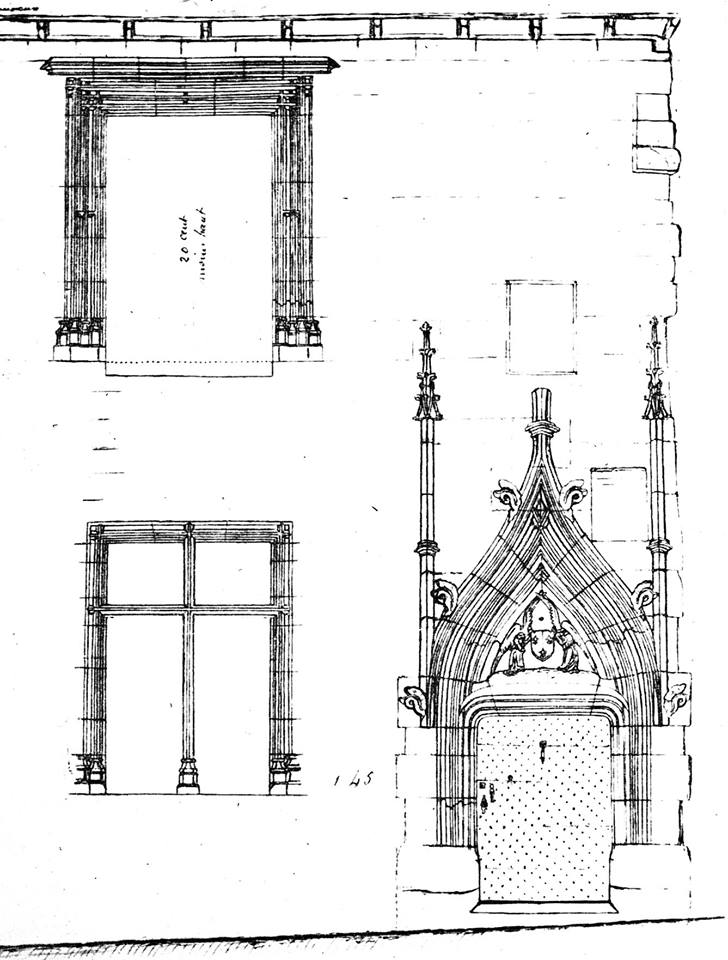
Ancient sénéchaussée, drawing from Eugène Camoreyt's notebooks (19th c.)

Sénéchaussée d'Armagnac was a main sénéchaussée created in 1473, with its seat in the town of Lectoure (Gers) and a territory larger than the province of Armagnac. Most of the territory is located in the present-day department of Gers and a small part in Landes and Lot-et-Garonne.

== Territory ==
The title can lead to confusion, given the extreme complexity of feudal divisions, which rarely correspond to so-called 'natural' regions or to others of more recent creation. Thus Armagnac does not refer to the area known today for the production of its famous brandy, but to the possessions of the last Count of Armagnac, constituting an irregular and fragmented domain, which at its creation included Lomagne[fr], Brulhois[fr], Fezensaguet[fr], Fezensac, Éauzan[fr], Bas-Armagnac, Rivière-Basse[fr] and Quatre-Vallées.

== History ==
The Sénéschaussée d'Armagnac was created by Louis XI in 1473, following the capture of Lectoure and the annexation of the County of Armagnac to the Kingdom of France.

From the outset, it was the focus of a battle between rival towns vying to become its capital. It was supposed to be Auch, but the city was hit by a plague epidemic and Lectoure was finally chosen, an advantage that would enable it to rise from its ruins. Vic-Fezensac was also in the running, arguing that it had numerous matters to deal with. In 1490, the consuls of Lectoure obtained confirmation from Charles VIII that the sénéchaussée had been definitively established in their town. In 1529–1530, the consuls had to face a trial before the Toulouse Parliament against Auch and Vic-Fezensac. In 1615, Auch finally obtained satisfaction, but only for eighteen months, before a ruling by the Parliament restored Lectoure's rights. Finally, Auch obtained its own seneschalcedom, at the cost of dismembering the Armagnac seneschalcedom: over time, l'Isle-Jourdain obtained a small seneschalcedom, as did Condom. Lectoure retained only Lomagne and Brulhois.

n 1628, the Lectoure sénéchaussée was granted a presidial court, enabling it to handle more important matters. King Louis XIII signed the edict in Bordeaux.

In 1789, the sénéchaussée sent four deputies to the General Estates:

- Clergy.
  - 1. Raymond Ducastaing[fr], priest of Lannux.
- Noblesse.
  - 2. Jean-Paul d'Angosse[fr], baron of Corbères, marshal of camp, grand seneschal governor of Armagnac.
- Third State.
  - 3. Jean-Jacques de Laterrade[fr], king's counselor, judge-mage, lieutenant-general of the seneschal and presidial court of Armagnac.
  - 4. Jean-Louis Laclaverie[fr], lawyer in parlement, residing in La Chapelle.

This was one of its last actions before the Revolution abolished it, after which its premises were abandoned and demolished around 1835.

== Sénéchaussée in Lectoure ==
The Seneschaussée building was located at the western corner of today's streets, Nationale and Montebello, on the site of the grain market, which at the time was occupied by the town hall. It stretched from south to north between the streets Nationale and Marès. It was probably built, or laid out, when the sénéchaussée was created, during the reconstruction of the town. It was largely destroyed by the siege of 1473. The project may have been under the direction of master builder Mathieu Reguaneau[fr]. It is unknown how far it extended to the east, but it was an impressive building in terms of floor area.

Here, at the rate of two daily sessions, worked the seneschal, appointed by the king, the juge-mage[fr] or lieutenant general, a senior lieutenant, a civil and criminal lieutenant, advisors and many subordinates, clerks, and others. The prisons, where the executioners operated — the last of whom was Jean Rascat (1759–1846) — were located in the basement.

All that remains today is a Gothic door with pinnacles and fleurons, and a tympanum decorated with two angels bearing a coat of arms (later hammered out). The style of this door is close to, and contemporary with, that of the bell tower of Saint-Gervais-Saint-Protais cathedral. It could therefore be the work of master builder Mathieu Reguaneau. To the left of this doorway are two windows, one on the first floor, the other on the second floor, framed by badly deteriorated prismatic moldings. A drawing by Eugène Camoreyt shows this section in its 19th-century state.

The sénéchaussée seat was demolished around 1835. The sénéchaussée prison was disused and replaced by the new prison built in 1823 inside the former Cordeliers Convent[fr].

The site is occupied by residential houses and, on the Rue Nationale side, by a café, the Café de la Comédie, and a small municipal theater (decorated with paintings by Paul Noël Lasseran, and destroyed by fire in the 1950s), all of which was replaced in the 1960s by a village hall, now a cinema called “Le Sénéchal”. Today, a new auditorium, the Salle de la Comédie, has been fitted out, reviving Lectoure's theater tradition.

== See also ==
- Bailliage et sénéchaussée
- Généralité (France)
- Ancient provinces de France
- Seneschal of the Landes
- Gascony
