= Gaudin =

Gaudin is a French surname. Notable people with the surname include:

- André Gaudin, a French rower
- Antoine Marc Gaudin (1900–1974), an American engineer
- Chad Gaudin (born 1983), an American baseball player
- Christian Gaudin (politician) (born 1950), a member of the Senate of France
- Christian Gaudin (handballer) (born 1967), a French team handball player
- Noah Gaudin (born 1999), a French team handball player
- Clark Gaudin (1931–2020), an American politician
- Damien Gaudin (born 1986), a French cyclist
- Henri Gaudin (1933–2021), French architect
- Jean-Claude Gaudin (1939-2024), former mayor of Marseille
- Jean François Aimé Théophile Philippe Gaudin (1766-1833), a Swiss pastor, professor and botanist
- Jean Gaudin (1879–1954), French painter, glass and mosaic artist
- Jules Gaudin (born 2000), French footballer
- Lucien Gaudin (1886–1934), French fencer and Olympic medalist
- Marc Antoine Auguste Gaudin (1804–1880), a French chemistry researcher and inventor of an air vacuum pump
- Marie Gaudin (1495–1580), French lady-in-waiting, lover of Francis I, King of France, and of Pope Leo X
- Martin-Michel-Charles Gaudin (1756–1841), duc de Gaete, a French Minister of Finances
- Michel Gaudin (1931-2023), physicist
- Thibaud Gaudin (c. 1229–1292), a Grand Master of the Knights Templar
- Wayne Gaudin (1920–1999), American politician

== See also ==
- Godin (disambiguation)
