= Lillian Walker (politician) =

American politician (1923–2016)

Lillian W. Walker

Louisiana State Representative for East Baton Rouge Parish
- In office 1964–1972
- Preceded by: Four at-large members: William F. "Bill" Bernhard, Jr. Eugene Webb McGehee; A. T. Sanders Jr. Jack Dyer
- Succeeded by: Clark Gaudin (single-member district)

Personal details
- Born: May 8, 1923 Meridian, Mississippi
- Died: December 22, 2016 (aged 93) Baton Rouge, Louisiana
- Resting place: Greenoaks Mausoleum in Baton Rouge
- Party: Democratic
- Spouse: Edward Everett Walker (married c. 1942-1998, his death)
- Children: Edward Theodore Walker; Betti Helen Walker Buhler
- Parent(s): Rudolph Blanche and Maggie Elizabeth George Walker
- Occupation: Insurance agent Political and social activist

Lillian Walker Walker, known as Lillian W. Walker (May 8, 1923 – December 22, 2016), was a member of the Louisiana House of Representatives from East Baton Rouge Parish, Louisiana, who served two terms from 1964 to 1972.

== Biography ==
After two terms in the state House, Walker was narrowly unseated in the general election held on February 1, 1972, by the Republican Clark Gaudin, also of Baton Rouge.

On November 2, 1982, more than a decade after her state House service ended, Walker was elected to the Louisiana Board of Elementary and Secondary Education.

A native of Meridian in Lauderdale County in eastern Mississippi, Walker had the maiden name of "Walker" too. Her parents were Rudolph Blanche Walker and the former Maggie Elizabeth George.

Until his death, Walker was married for fifty-six years to Edward E. Walker (1921–1998).

Walker was a charter member in 1956 of the Broadmoor Presbyterian Church at 9340 Florida Boulevard in Baton Rouge; she was the captain of its first building fund in 1957. She died at her home in Baton Rouge at the age of ninety-three. She is entombed at Greenoaks Mausoleum in Baton Rouge.

Louisiana House of Representatives
Preceded by Four at-large members William F. "Bill" Bernhard, Jr. Eugene Webb McGehee; A. T. "Apple" Sanders, Jr. Jack M. Dyer	Louisiana State Representative for East Baton Rouge Parish; 1964–1972	Succeeded by Clark Gaudin
