= Jean Gaudin =

Jean Gaudin may refer to:

- Jean-Claude Gaudin (born 1939), French politician
- Jean François Aimé Théophile Philippe Gaudin (1766–1833), Swiss pastor, professor and botanist
- Jean Gaudin (glass artist) (1879–1954), French painter, glass and mosaic artist

== See also ==
- Gaudin
