= Luther F. Cole =

American judge (1925–2013)

Luther Francis Cole

Louisiana State Representative from East Baton Rouge Parish
- In office 1964–1967
- Preceded by: At-large membership: A. T. "Apple" Sanders, Jr. William F. "Bill" Bernhard, Jr. Jack Dyer Eugene McGehee
- Succeeded by: Clark Gaudin

Justice of the Louisiana Supreme Court
- In office 1986–1992
- Preceded by: Fred A. Blanche Jr.
- Succeeded by: Catherine D. Kimball

Personal details
- Born: October 25, 1925 Alexandria, Rapides Parish; Louisiana, USA
- Died: July 26, 2013 (aged 87) Baton Rouge, Louisiana
- Cause of death: Undiagnosed ailment
- Resting place: Resthaven Gardens of Memory in Baton Rouge
- Party: Democratic
- Spouse: Juanita Barton Cole (married 1945-2013, his death)
- Children: Fran Harbour Jeffrey Cole Christopher Warren Cole,
- Education: Louisiana Tech University; Louisiana State University Law Center
- Occupation: Attorney

Military service
- Branch/service: United States Navy
- Battles/wars: World War II

Luther Francis Cole (October 25, 1925 – July 26, 2013) was an American lawyer and politician from Baton Rouge, Louisiana, who served as a state legislator and then as a judge.

Cole was born in Alexandria in Rapides Parish, one of twelve children of Clement and Catherine Cole. He graduated from Bolton High School and served in the United States Navy during World War II. He attended Louisiana Tech University in Ruston and graduated from Louisiana State University Law Center in Baton Rouge. He joined a friend, Warren Mengis, in the formation of the Cole and Mengis law firm in Baton Rouge. They later partnered with Lawrence Durant.

A Democrat, Cole served in the Louisiana House of Representatives during the administration of Governor John McKeithen. His tenure extended only from 1964 until 1967, when he resigned to become a judge of the 19th Judicial District Court. From 1972 to 1973, he was president of the Louisiana District Judges Association. He subsequently served as well on the Louisiana First Circuit Court of Appeal and the Louisiana Supreme Court, Fifth District seat, to which he was elected on April 5, 1986. With nearly 62 percent of the vote, Cole defeated two opponents, Republican Patsy McDowell Cooper and fellow Democrat C. Alvin Tyler. Cole remained on the Supreme Court until his retirement in 1992; he was succeeded by Catherine D. Kimball, a former chief justice of the court.

Cole was the son of Clem and Catherine Wiley Cole. He was a Baptist. Cole and his wife, the former Juanita Barton, originally from Horatio, in Sevier County in southwestern Arkansas, had three children, Frances Harbour and husband Robert, Jeffrey Cole and wife Polly, and Christopher Warren Cole, and eight grandchildren. Graveside services were held on July 29 at Resthaven Gardens of Memory in Baton Rouge.

Son Jeffrey Cole, a Baton Rouge attorney, noted that his father never planned to serve on the state Supreme Court but ran for the post when the opportunity presented itself. Jeffrey Cole said that his father was instrumental in the establishment of a retirement system for state court judges: "... He was not only a judge, but he was a leader and someone who helped with the entire judicial system in Louisiana. I think he was proud of being a self-made man and the things he was able to accomplish."

Louisiana House of Representatives
Preceded by At-large membership: A. T. "Apple" Sanders, Jr. William F. "Bill" Bernhard, Jr. Jack M. Dyer Eugene McGehee	Louisiana State Representative from East Baton Rouge Parish; Luther Francis Cole; 1964–1967	Succeeded by Clark Gaudin
Preceded by Missing	Louisiana Supreme Court, Associate Justice, Fifth District; Luther Francis Cole; 1986–1992	Succeeded by Catherine D. Kimball
