= Sylvie Gaudin =

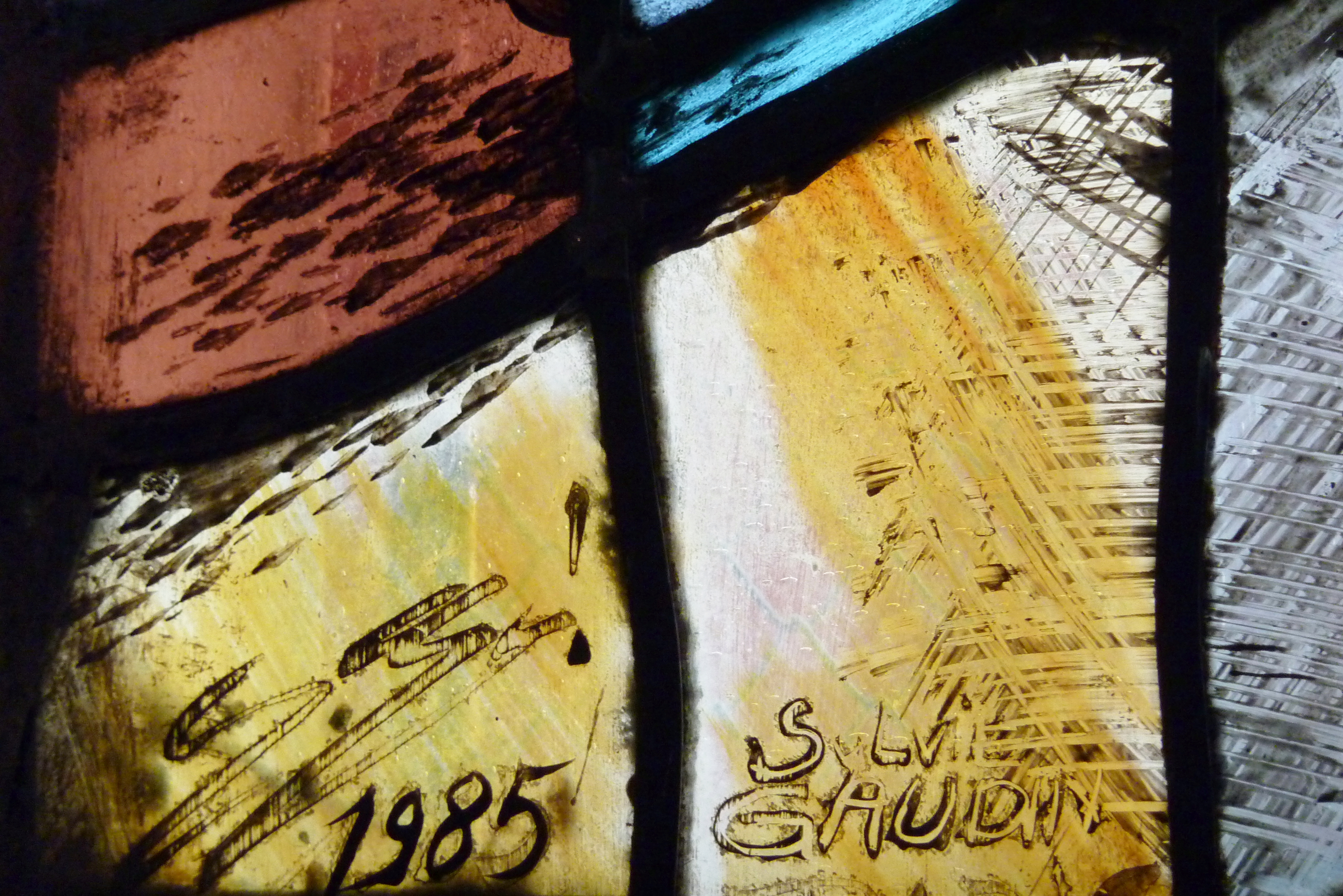
- her signature
- Born: 19 June 1950; Boulogne-Billancourt
- Died: 1994 (aged 43–44)
- Known for: stained glass
- Parent: Pierre Gaudin
- Relatives: Jean Gaudin - Grand Father

Sylvie Gaudin (19 June 1950 – 1994) was a French glass painter and stained glass artist and manufacturer.

== Life ==
Gaudin was born in Boulogne-Billancourt in 1950, her father was the stained glass designer Pierre Gaudin. She was the fourth generation of stained glass workers and she took over the business when her father died. Pierre Gaudin died in 1973, his father was Jean Gaudin (1879–1954) and his father and Sylvie's great grandfather was Félix Gaudin (1851–1930) who was a glass painter and mosaic artist.

In 1988 she painted realistic pictures of the people and scenery in the rural scenery around Cazenac Church in the Dordogne.

Gaudin died in 1994.

== Works (include) ==
- Rouen Cathedral - Windows of St Peter and St Paul
- Church of St-Gervais-et-St-Protais in Paris, five windows in the southwest chevet of the church, representing the Nativity, Pentecost, the Baptism, the Crucifixion, and Resurrection of Christ. (1990-1993)
- Cazenac Church - Hand painted windows from 1988
