= Ancient Diocese of Lectoure =

Roman Catholic diocese in France (4 century - 1801)

Coordinates: 43.9339°N 0.6233°E

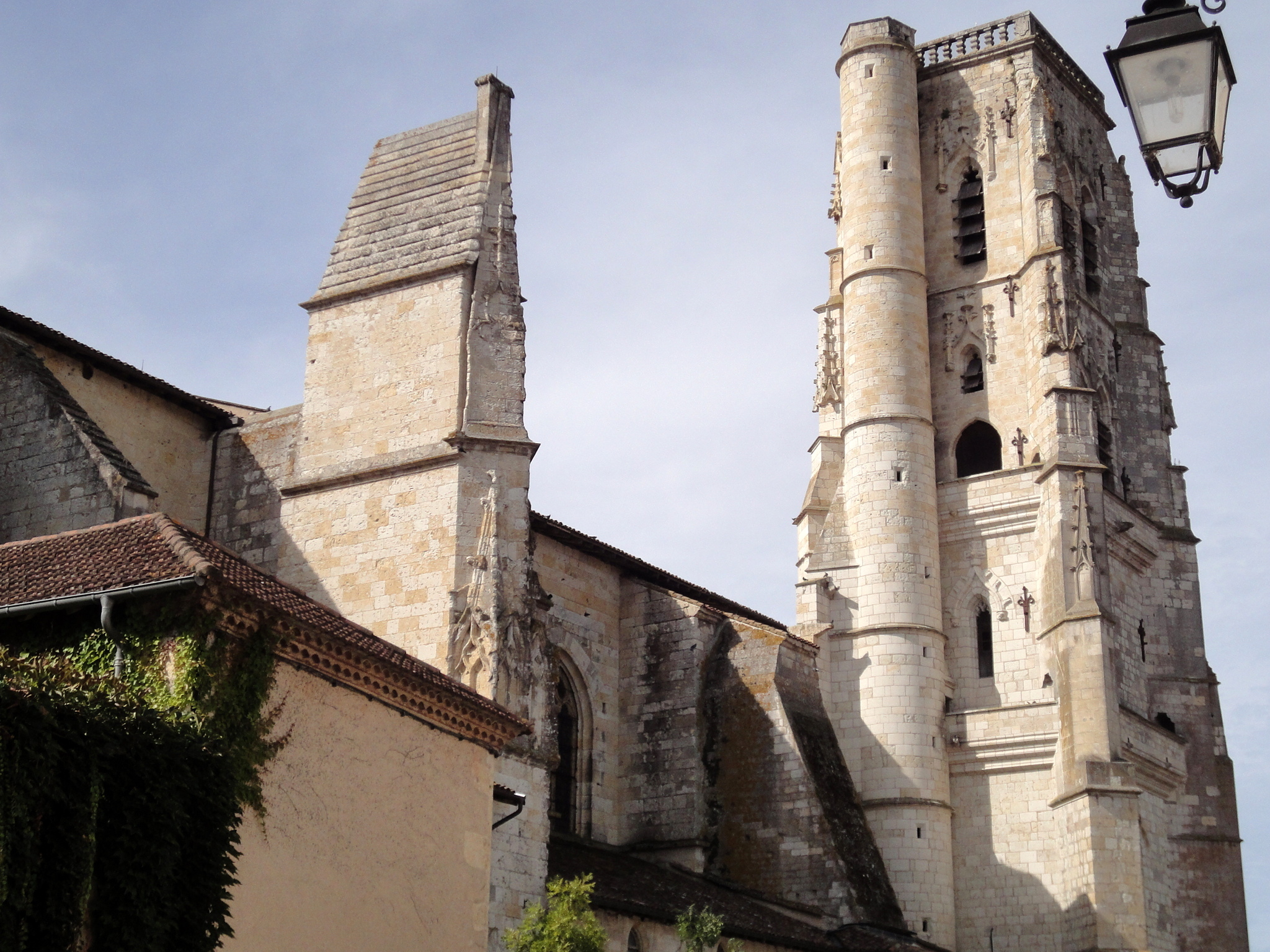
Lectoure Cathedral

The former Catholic Diocese of Lectoure was in south-west France. It existed from the fourth century until the time of the French Revolution, when it was suppressed under the Concordat of 1801. Its see was Lectoure Cathedral. Lectoure is now a commune of Gers.

Its territory was divided between the diocese of Agen and the archdiocese of Toulouse.

== Bishops ==
=== To 1100 ===
- Heuterus
- c. 506: Vigile
- c. 549: Aletius
- The diocese was then for some centuries united with the diocese of Auch
- c. 990: Bernard I.
- c. 1052: Arnaud I.
- c. 1060: Johannes I.
- Raimond I.
- 1061–1097: Ebbon
- 1097–1103: Pierre I.

=== 1100–1400 ===
- 1103–1118: Garcias I.
- 1118–1126: Guillaume I. d'Andozile
- 1126 to c. 1160: Vivien
- c. 1160–1162 or 1163: Bertrand I. de Montaut
- c. 1175 to c. 1195: Garcias II. Sanche
- 1196 to c. 1205: Bernard II.
- c. 1215 to c. 1221: Arnaud II.
- c. 1229: Hugues I.
- c. 1240: Gaillard de Lambesc
- c. 1256: Géraud I.
- c. 1257: Guillaume II.
- 1268 to c. 1295: Géraud de Montlezun (Geraud of Monlezun)
- c. 1296–1302: Pierre II. de Ferrières
- 1303–1307: Raimond II.
- c. 1308–1330: Guillaume III. des Bordes
- c. 1336: Roger d'Armagnac
- c. 1344–1349: Arnaud III. Guillaume de La Barthe
- 1350–1354: Pierre III. Anzelirii
- 1365–1368: Pierre IV.
- 1368–1369: Hugues II.
- 1370–1371: Bernard III.
- 1372 to c. 1375: Vignier
- c. 1377–1383: Bérenger
- 1383: Rénier de Malent
- 1383–1384: Eudes
- 1384–1405: Raimond III. de Cambanilla

=== From 1400 ===
- c. 1407–1416: Arnaud IV. de Peyrac
- 1418–1425: Géraud III. Dupuy
- c. 1428–24 May 1449: Martin Gutteria de Pampelune
- 1449–1452: Bernard IV. André
- 1453–1479: Amaury
- c. 1480–1487: Hugues III. d'Espagne
- 1488–1494: Pierre V. d'Abzac de La Douze
- 21. December 1500 to 1505: Louis I. Pot
- 1505–1508: Pierre VI. du Faur
- 1509 to 17. April 1511: Bertrand II. de Lustrac
- 1511–1512: Paul
- 1512–1513: Guillaume IV. de Barton
- 1513–1544: Jean II. de Barton (Jean Barthon de Montbas, John Barton)
- 1544–1569: Guillaume V. de Barton (Guillaume Barthon de Montbas,
- 1590–1594: Charles de Bourbon
- 1599 to 24. March 1635: Léger de Plas
- 24 March 1635 to 12 April 1646: Jean III. d'Estresse
- 1646–1654: Louis II de La Rochefoucauld
- 21 September 1655 to 5. January 1671: Pierre-Louis Caset de Vautorte
- 1671 to 22 December 1691: Hugues de Bar
- 6. April 1692 to 13. October 1717: François-Louis de Polastron
- 1717–1720: Louis III. d'Illers d'Entragues
- 8. January 1721 to 1745: Paul-Robert Hertault de Beaufort
- 1745 to 14 May 1760: Claude-François de Narbonne-Pelet
- 1760 to 26 June 1772: Pierre VII. Chapelle de Jumilhac de Cubjac
- 7 September 1772 to 1790: Louis-Emmanuel de Cugnac

== See also ==
- Catholic Church in France
- List of Catholic dioceses in France

== Books ==
- Gams, Pius Bonifatius (1873). Series episcoporum Ecclesiae catholicae: quotquot innotuerunt a beato Petro apostolo. Ratisbon: Typis et Sumptibus Georgii Josephi Manz. pp. 548–549. (Use with caution; obsolete)
- Eubel, Conradus, ed. (1913). Hierarchia catholica, Tomus 1 (second ed.). Münster: Libreria Regensbergiana. p. 301. (in Latin)
- Eubel, Conradus, ed. (1914). Hierarchia catholica, Tomus 2 (second ed.). Münster: Libreria Regensbergiana. p. 175.
- Eubel, Conradus, ed. (1923). Hierarchia catholica, Tomus 3 (second ed.). Münster: Libreria Regensbergiana.
- Gauchat, Patritius (Patrice) (1935). Hierarchia catholica IV (1592-1667). Münster: Libraria Regensbergiana. p. 219.
- Ritzler, Remigius; Sefrin, Pirminus (1952). Hierarchia catholica medii et recentis aevi V (1667-1730). Patavii: Messagero di S. Antonio.
- Ritzler, Remigius; Sefrin, Pirminus (1958). Hierarchia catholica medii et recentis aevi VI (1730-1799). Patavii: Messagero di S. Antonio.
- Jean, Armand (1891). Les évêques et les archevêques de France depuis 1682 jusqu'à 1801 (in French). Paris: A. Picard. p. 520.
- Pisani, Paul (1907). Répertoire biographique de l'épiscopat constitutionnel (1791-1802) (in French). Paris: A. Picard et fils.
