= Goding =

Goding may refer to:

Places

- Göding, or Hodonín, town in the Czech Republic

People

- Charlie Goding (1876–1926), Australian rules footballer
- Fred Goding (born 1905), Australian rules footballer
- Frederic Webster Goding (1858–1933), American diplomat and entomologist
- Maurice W. Goding, (1911–1998) American lawyer, High Commissioner for the Trust Territory of the Pacific Islands
- John Goding, member of The Washington Ballet

== See also ==
- Godin (disambiguation)
