= Pierre Feuga =

French novelist, essayist and translator

- Born: 16 October 1942; Lectoure
- Died: 10 June 2008 (aged 65); Paris
- Occupations: Essayist; Translator

Pierre Feuga (16 October 1942 – 10 June 2008) was a French novelist, essayist and translator (from Sanskrit and Latin). A specialist of the Vedanta, the cults of Shakti and tantrism, he also taught yoga for twenty-seven years.

== Biography ==
Born in a family of artists and travelers, Pierre Feuga also made long trips around the world. He won the Concours général of literature at age sixteen while he was a pupil at Lycée Louis-le-Grand in Paris.

Although Feuga did not recognize any master, he nevertheless was very influenced by Patrick Le Bail then Jean Klein with whom he studied the Vedanta and the Hatha-Yoga in the tradition of Jammu-Kashmir.

After a long sailing trip that led him to New Caledonia (where he gave his first yoga classes), he settled in Paris and taught there until his death on 10 June 2008.

At the same time, he undertook a series of works on the Tantric universe as well as on awakening. Publishing in particular with Dangles and Albin Michel, he was entrusted in 1998 with the drafting of the Que sais-je? devoted to yoga (#643) in collaboration with Tara Michaël.

In 2004 he became the literary editor of the Almora editions.

He was also a member of the editorial board of the journal Connaissance des religions.

== Publications ==
- 1963: Cracher dans la mer, novel, Éditions Julliard
- 1965: La Galère en bois de rose, novel, Robert Laffont
- 1988: Cent douze méditations tantriques, the "Vijñâna-Bhairava", translation from Sanskrit and commentary, Accarias/L'Originel, ISBN 2863161458
- 1989: Cinq visages de la Déesse, Le Mail/Le Rocher, ISBN 2903951217
- 1989: Liber de Catulle, translation from Latin, Orphée/La Différence
- 1990: Les Trophées, José-Maria de Heredia, choice and presentation, Orphée/La Différence
- 1990: Le bonheur est de ce monde, Accarias-L'Originel, ISBN 978-2863160398
- 1992: Satires de Juvénal, translation from Latin, Orphée/La Différence
- 1992: L'Art de la concentration, Albin Michel, series "Espaces libres", n°32, ISBN 978-2226059697
- 1994: Tantrisme, Dangles, ISBN 978-2703308522
- 1998: Le Yoga, in collaboration with Tara Michaël, PUF, series Que sais-je ?, n°643
- 2004: Comme un cercle de feu, translation from Sanskrit and commentaries of the Mândûkya-upanishad and the Kârikâ by Gaudapâda, Accarias-L'Originel, ISBN 978-2863161067
- 2005: Pour l'Éveil, Almora, ISBN 978-2351180006
- 2008: Le Chemin des flammes, Almora, ISBN 978-2351180228
- 2008: Le Miroir du vent, novel, Almora, ISBN 978-2351180211
- 2010: Fragments tantriques, Almora, (posthumous collection of articles and chronicles), ISBN 978-2351180440
