= Aurélie Ghika =

Aurélie Soubiran, Princess Ghika
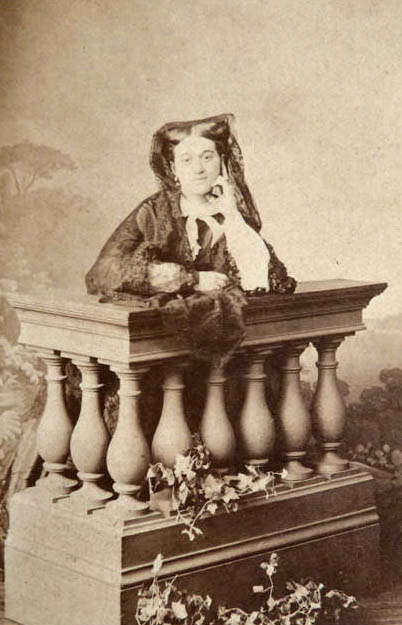
- Visiting card photograph by Levitsky, Paris, 1863
- Born: Henriette Aurélie Soubiran; 27 March 1820; Caen, Calvados, France
- Died: 21 March 1904 (aged 83); Lectoure, Gers, France
- Occupation: Writer

Aurélie Soubiran, Princess Ghika (27 March 1820 – 21 March 1904) was a French writer. She married a member of the Ghica family, princes of Wallachia, and wrote about her impressions of that country. She also wrote novels and essays.

== Life ==
Aurélie de Soubiran was born on 27 March 1820 in Lectoure, Gers. She was one of two daughters of Colonel Paul Emile Soubiran (1770–1855), who seems to have led an adventurous life. Her sister Hédelmone Soubiran appeared in court in 1854 on charges of bigamy. It was claimed she had married in England, then left her husband without a divorce and moved to Paris, where she married a hotel owner.

Aurélie de Soubiran became an essayist. Her novel Virginia (1845) is about a street singer in Venice who defies convention. She travels alone, wear men's clothes, smokes and lives with her lover, a young Roman. A critic writing in the Bibliographie catholique affected shock that Aurélie de Soubiran dared put her name to a work that exalted immorality.

Aurélie married Grigore Ghika (1812 – 22 September 1858) on 23 November 1849 in Paris. He was the fourth son of Prince Grigore IV Ghica, hospodar (ruler) of Wallachia. Her husband had had an earlier liaison with Alexandrina Coressi, who gave him two children born in 1833 and 1837. Her husband had emigrated to Paris in 1848 after participating in the Wallachian Revolution of 1848.

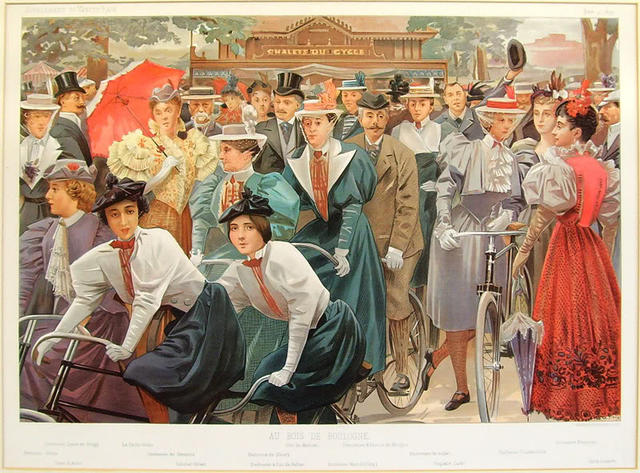
In this fashionable crowd in the Bois de Boulogne by Guth, 1897, Ghika appears at far left

In 1850 Aurélie published La Valachie moderne (Modern Wallachia), based on a trip she had made to this country. She sketched the appearance and customs of people, including the ordinary people and the lords isolated in their country homes. Her account was generally positive, but did not gloss over problems. A reviewer said, "... we regret that the author did not give more development to this sketch, which could have offered real interest; her style also leaves much to be desired; it lacks grace and naturalness; it is cut in little phrases that are somewhat affected and unattractive. Her 1858 La Valachie devant l'Europe (Wallachia before Europe) was criticized for giving no more than a view of the social life of the wealthy, and avoiding all discussion of the very real political issues at the time.

She died on 21 March 1904.

== Publications ==
- Mme G. Aurélie Soubiran; M. J.-M. Roques (1841), Nos Étrennes de 1841, Voy. Ro-QUES
- Mme G. Aurélie Soubiran (1845), Virginia, Paris: impr. de De-lanchy
- Mme G. Aurélie Soubiran (1848), Marguerite et Jeanne, Paris: Comptoir des imprinteurs unis.
- Mme G. Aurélie Soubiran (1848), Le Petit Livre des femmes, Paris: Comon, p. 48
- Aurélie Ghika (1850), La Valachie moderne, Paris: Comptoir des imprimeurs re'unis, Comon (de Pimfir. de Remquet, a Paris)
- Aurélie Ghika (1852), Lettres d'un penseur des bords du Danube, Paris: Comptoir des imprinteurs unis, p. 239
  - Ghika, Aurélie (1854), Denkerbriefe vom walachischen Donauufer (in German), translated into German by hg. von Frdr. Paalzow, Duncker
- Aurélie Ghika (1856), Galerie historique et critique du xixe siecle, Paris: Gaillard, pp. 23)
- Aurélie Ghika (1858), La Valachie devant l'Europe, Paris: E. Denlu, p. 61
- Aurélie Ghika (1866), La Duchesse de Cerni, Paris: Hetzel (de l'impr. Jouaust), p. 221
- Aurélie Ghika (1891), Le prince Napoléon, Lectoure: typogr. Oriacombe, p. 7
- Aurélie Ghika (1891), À mes compatriotes, Lectoure: impr. de Oriacombe, p. 9

== Sources ==
- Aurélie de Soubiran Ghika (princesse, 1820–1904) (in French), BnF: Bibliotheque Nationale de France
- Budu-Ghyka, Mona & Florian, "Arbre Genealogique de la famille : Grigore IV" (PDF), Ghika : le Site de la Famille (in French)
- Monte, Léopold (1858), "Chronique", Revue contemporaine (in French), Bureaux de la Revue contemporaine.
- Pic du Gers (29–30 May 1854), "Archived copy" (PDF), Journal de Toulouse (in French), archived from the original (PDF) on 2016-03-03
- Quérard, J.-M. (1857), La Roumanie, Moldavie, Valachie et Transylvanie, la Serbie, le Montenegro et la Bosnie. Essai de bibliotheque francaise historique de ces principautes (in French), Franck
- Stelling-Michaud, Suzanne, ed. (1972), Livre du Recteur de l'Académie de Genève : 1559–1878 (le) (in French), vol. III Notice Biographiques des Etudiants D-G, Librairie Droz, ISBN 978-2-600-03194-3
- Vatimesnil, H. de, ed. (1845), Bibliographie catholique: revue critique des ouvrages de religion, de philosophie, d'histoire, etc (in French), Bibliographie catholique

== External link ==
- Works by Aurélie Ghika at Gallica
