= Castet-Arrouy =

- Commune
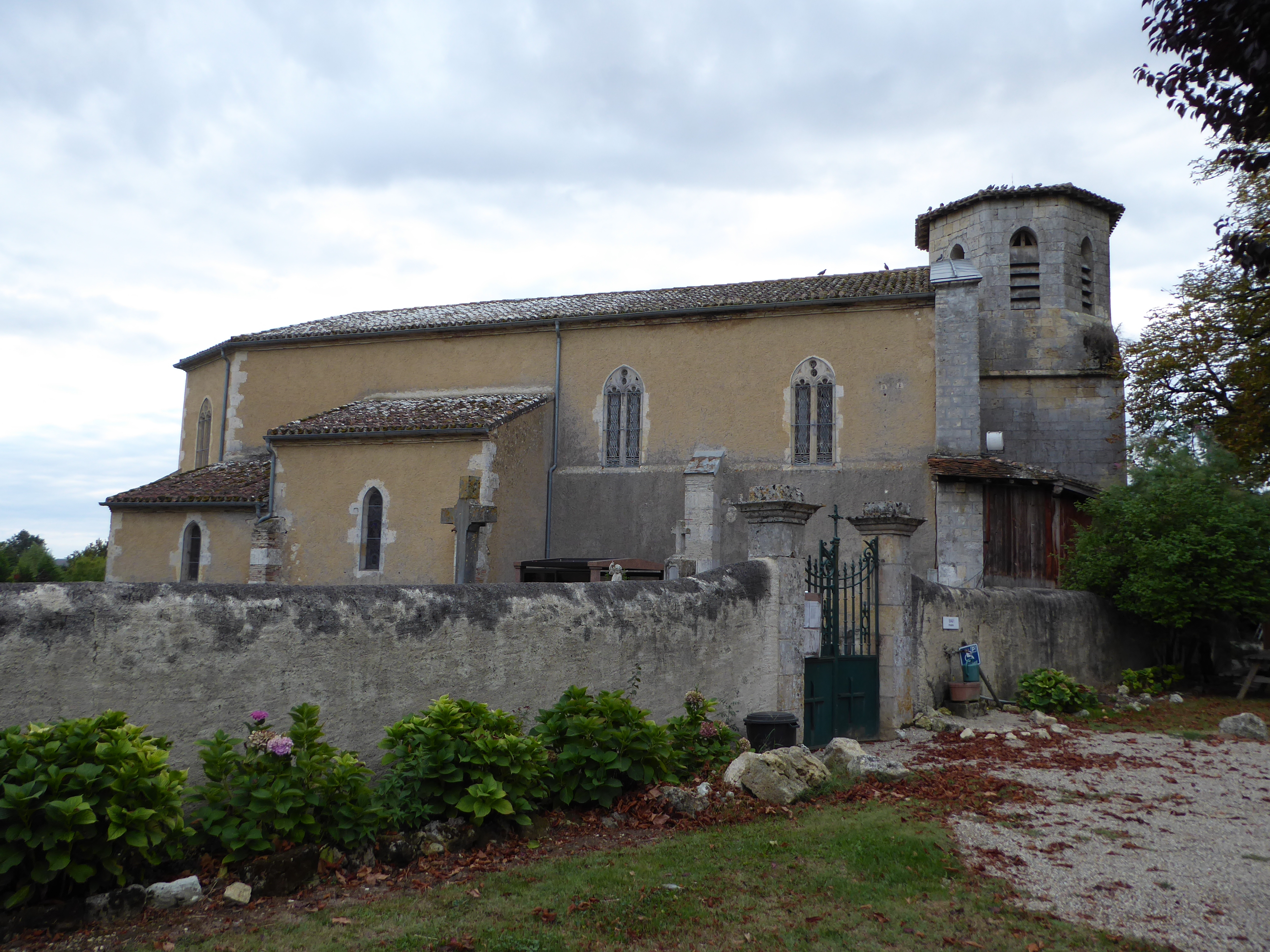
- Church of Saint Blandine

- Coat of arms
- Location of Castet-Arrouy
- Location within France Location within Occitanie
- Coordinates: 43°58′50″N 0°43′00″E
- Country: France
- Region: Occitania
- Department: Gers
- Arrondissement: Condom
- Canton: Lectoure-Lomagne
- Intercommunality: Lomagne Gersoise

Government
  - Mayor (2020–2026): Robert Laffourcade
- Area^{1}: 8.04 km^{2} (3.10 sq mi)
- Elevation: 107 m (351 ft)
- Highest elevation: 180 m (590 ft)
- Lowest elevation: 87 m (285 ft)
- Population (2023): 168
  - Density: 20.9/km^{2} (54.1/sq mi)
- Time zone: UTC+01:00 (CET)
  - Summer (DST): UTC+02:00 (CEST)
- INSEE/Postal code: 32085 /32340
- ^{1} French Land Register data, which excludes lakes, ponds, glaciers > 1 km^{2} (0.386 sq mi or 247 acres) and river estuaries.

Castet-Arrouy is a commune in the Gers department in southwestern France.

== Geography ==
The river Auroue flows north through the commune and forms part of its northeastern border.

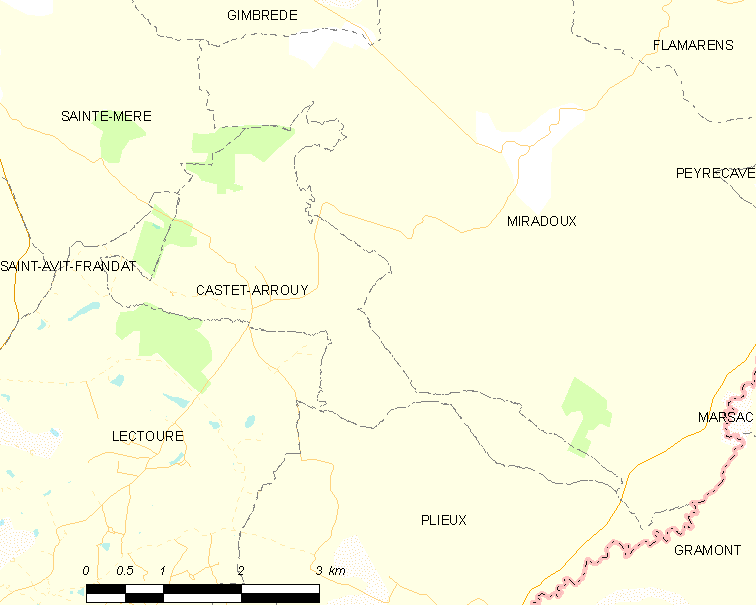
Castet-Arrouy and its surrounding communes

== Population ==
Historical population
Year	Pop.	±% p.a.
1968	174	—
1975	145	−2.57%
1982	133	−1.23%
1990	132	−0.09%
1999	144	+0.97%
2007	183	+3.04%
2012	181	−0.22%
2017	186	+0.55%
2023	168	−1.68%
Source: INSEE

== Sites of interest ==
The Church of Saint Blandine is the main church of Castet-Arrouy. The choir was painted with murals by artist Paul Noël Lasseran in 1901.

== See also ==
- Communes of the Gers department
