= Godin =

Godin may refer to:

Places

- Godin, Doulougou, a village in the Doulougou Department of Kouritenga Province in Burkina Faso
- Godin (Gounghin), a village in the Gounghin Department of Kouritenga Province in Burkina Faso
- Godin, Bissiga, a village in the Bissiga Department of Kouritenga Province in Burkina Faso
- Godin (settlement), a settlement in Les Awirs, Flémalle, province of Liège, Belgium
- Godin (crater), a lunar impact crater named after Louis Godin
- Godin Tepe is an archaeological site in western Iran

Other

- Godin (surname), a list of people with the surname
- Godin (guitar manufacturer), a Canadian guitar manufacturing company

== See also ==
- Gaudin (disambiguation)
- Goding (disambiguation)
