= Villers-Bocage, Calvados =

Villers-Bocage
- Commune
- Town hall

- Coat of arms
- Location of Villers-Bocage
- Location within France Location within Normandy
- Coordinates: 49°05′N 0°40′W
- Country: France
- Region: Normandy
- Department: Calvados
- Arrondissement: Vire
- Canton: Les Monts d'Aunay
- Intercommunality: Pré-Bocage Intercom

Government
  - Mayor (2020–2026): Stéphanie Leberrurier
- Area^{1}: 5.76 km^{2} (2.22 sq mi)
- Elevation: 170 m (560 ft)
- Highest elevation: 217 m (712 ft)
- Lowest elevation: 95 m (312 ft)
- Population (2023): 3,088
  - Density: 536/km^{2} (1,390/sq mi)
- Time zone: UTC+01:00 (CET)
  - Summer (DST): UTC+02:00 (CEST)
- INSEE/Postal code: 14752 /14310
- ^{1} French Land Register data, which excludes lakes, ponds, glaciers > 1 km^{2} (0.386 sq mi or 247 acres) and river estuaries.

Villers-Bocage (French pronunciation: [vilɛʁ bɔkaʒ]) is a commune in the Calvados department in the Normandy region in Northern France.

The commune is listed as a Village étape.

== History ==
=== Second World War ===
The Battle of Villers-Bocage was a significant battle between British and German forces on 13 June 1944 during the Battle of Normandy. Further fighting occurred two weeks later during Operation Epsom, during which the village was destroyed by 250 RAF heavy bombers.

== Population ==
Historical population

| Year | Pop. | ±% p.a. |
|---|---|---|
| 1793 | 1,121 | — |
| 1800 | 1,010 | −1.48% |
| 1806 | 1,223 | +3.24% |
| 1821 | 1,177 | −0.26% |
| 1831 | 1,178 | +0.01% |
| 1836 | 1,178 | +0.00% |
| 1841 | 1,146 | −0.55% |
| 1846 | 1,134 | −0.21% |
| 1851 | 1,127 | −0.12% |
| 1856 | 1,105 | −0.39% |
| 1861 | 1,156 | +0.91% |
| 1866 | 1,155 | −0.02% |
| 1872 | 1,147 | −0.12% |
| 1876 | 1,139 | −0.17% |
| 1881 | 1,084 | −0.98% |
| 1886 | 1,147 | +1.14% |
| 1891 | 1,057 | −1.62% |
| 1896 | 1,104 | +0.87% |
| 1901 | 1,047 | −1.05% |

| Year | Pop. | ±% p.a. |
|---|---|---|
| 1906 | 1,073 | +0.49% |
| 1911 | 1,141 | +1.24% |
| 1921 | 1,039 | −0.93% |
| 1926 | 1,060 | +0.40% |
| 1931 | 1,093 | +0.62% |
| 1936 | 1,202 | +1.92% |
| 1946 | 743 | −4.70% |
| 1954 | 1,431 | +8.54% |
| 1962 | 1,825 | +3.09% |
| 1968 | 1,985 | +1.41% |
| 1975 | 2,317 | +2.23% |
| 1982 | 2,623 | +1.79% |
| 1990 | 2,845 | +1.02% |
| 1999 | 2,904 | +0.23% |
| 2007 | 2,894 | −0.04% |
| 2012 | 3,072 | +1.20% |
| 2017 | 3,108 | +0.23% |
| 2023 | 3,088 | −0.11% |

Source: EHESS and INSEE (1968-2023)

== Points of interest ==
- Le parc de l'Écanet is a public park in the commune that is open to the public all year round and features a lake.

=== Architecture contemporaine remarquable ===
- Église Saint-Martin - designed by architects Roland and Léon Le Sauter in 1950 it was awarded the Architecture contemporaine remarquable label in 2004. The church features stained glass by Pierre Gaudin.

== International relations ==
Villers-Bocage is twinned with:

- Mömbris, Germany since 1989
- Bampton, England since 1974

== See also ==
- Communes of the Calvados department
