= Jean Baptiste Guth =

French portrait artist

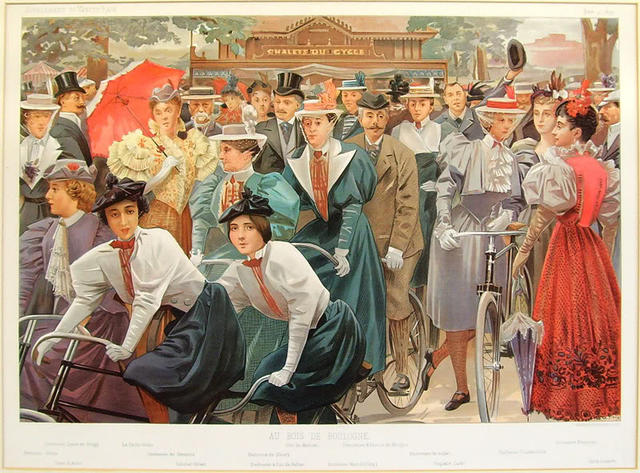
- Au Bois de Boulogne by Guth, 1897
- Born: 4 January 1855; Paris, France
- Died: 1922 (aged 66–67); Paris, France
- Education: École des Beaux-Arts, Jean-Léon Gérôme
- Known for: Portrait art, illustration

Jean Baptiste Guth (4 January 1855 – 1922) was a French portrait artist, active from 1875 until a few months before his death.

Guth worked mostly in watercolour and pastels. Much of his work was as an illustrator of magazines, especially the French L'Illustration and the British Vanity Fair, for which he signed his name simply as GUTH.

== Life and work ==
Born in Paris, in 1875 Guth was admitted as a student at the École des Beaux-Arts, where he was taught by Jean-Léon Gérôme. From 1882, perhaps recommended by Louis Charles Auguste Steinheil, he worked for Félix Gaudin, for whom he made drawings for stained glass windows. In 1883, Guth moved to London.

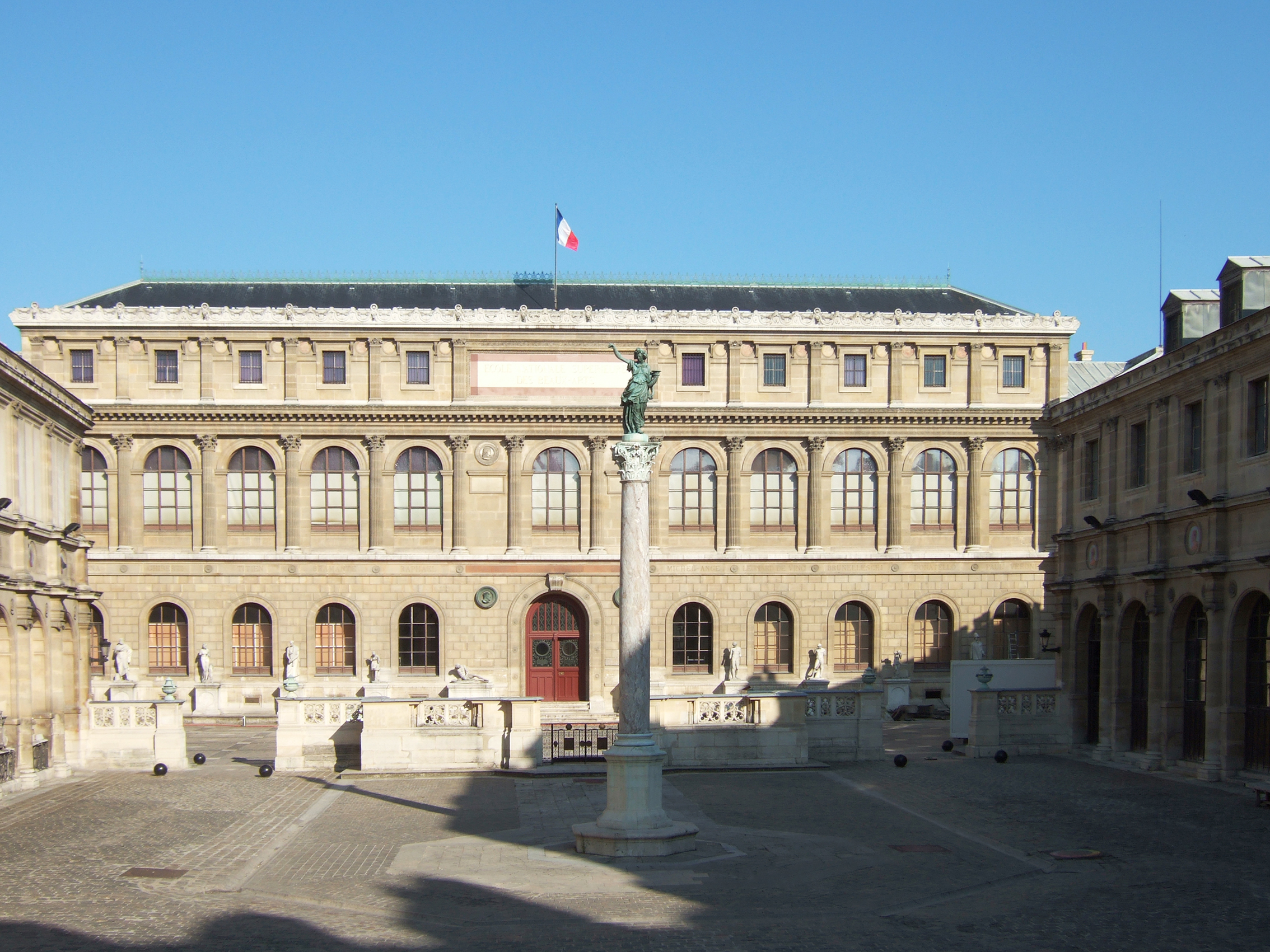
Guth's alma mater, the École des Beaux-Arts

From 1884 to 1920, Guth's work was published in the French magazine L'Illustration and from 1889 to 1909 in the British Vanity Fair, signing himself "GUTH". Among his many portraits for Vanity Fair were his images of Queen Victoria, Anatole France, and Alfred Dreyfus. After the death of "Ape" in 1889, "Spy" and Guth were the only regular contributors to the magazine's weekly colour portrait feature. The issue of 3 June 1897 included a double-page colour illustration by Guth, Au Bois de Boulogne, showing a fashionable crowd in the Bois de Boulogne park, Paris, including the Duke and Duchess of Rohan, the Prince and Princess of Broglie, the Duchess of Doudeauville, Cléo de Mérode, Liane de Pougy, Carolina Otéro, Princess Ghika, Ralouka Bibesco-Bassaraba de Brancovan, and Ernest Coquelin.

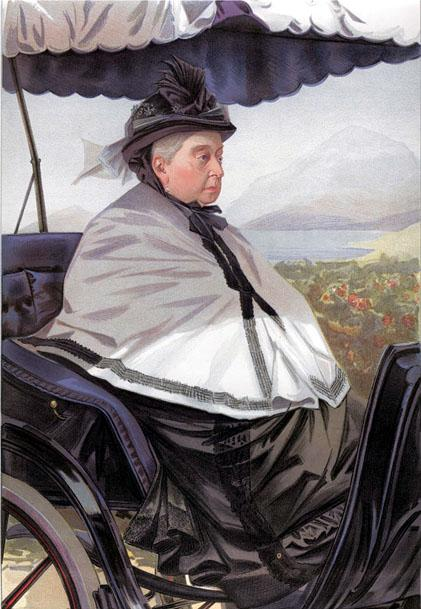
Queen Victoria at Cimiez, by Guth, for the diamond jubilee supplement of Vanity Fair, June 1897

Guth worked mostly in watercolour and pastels, for reproduction by chromolithography.

Guth revealed few details of his own life. A book about Gérôme notes the existence of a portrait of him by Guth, in which Gérôme is shown wearing a sculptor's smock, working on a bust. The artist is described as "Jean-Baptiste Guth, peintre et élève de Gérôme, sur lequel on ne sait pas grand chose..." (painter and pupil of Gérôme, about whom not much is known).

== Exhibitions ==
In the final year of the First World War, the Goupil Gallery in London presented an exhibition of Guth's portraits of British and French generals, admirals, and statesmen, under the title "Men who are running the War, and other celebrities of the Entente". The Graphic said in its review "No finer series of war portraits has been seen in London than those of M. Jean Baptiste Guth, now on exhibition at the Goupil Gallery in Regent Street... They are drawn in chalk, and have all been taken from life. They are audacious in their conceptualization, unavoidably annexing the defining feature of the subject. One of the best is that of Viscount Grey. The French series, which includes Poincaré, Clemenceau, Pétain and Foch, is very interesting and more novel to the average Englishman."

== Gallery ==
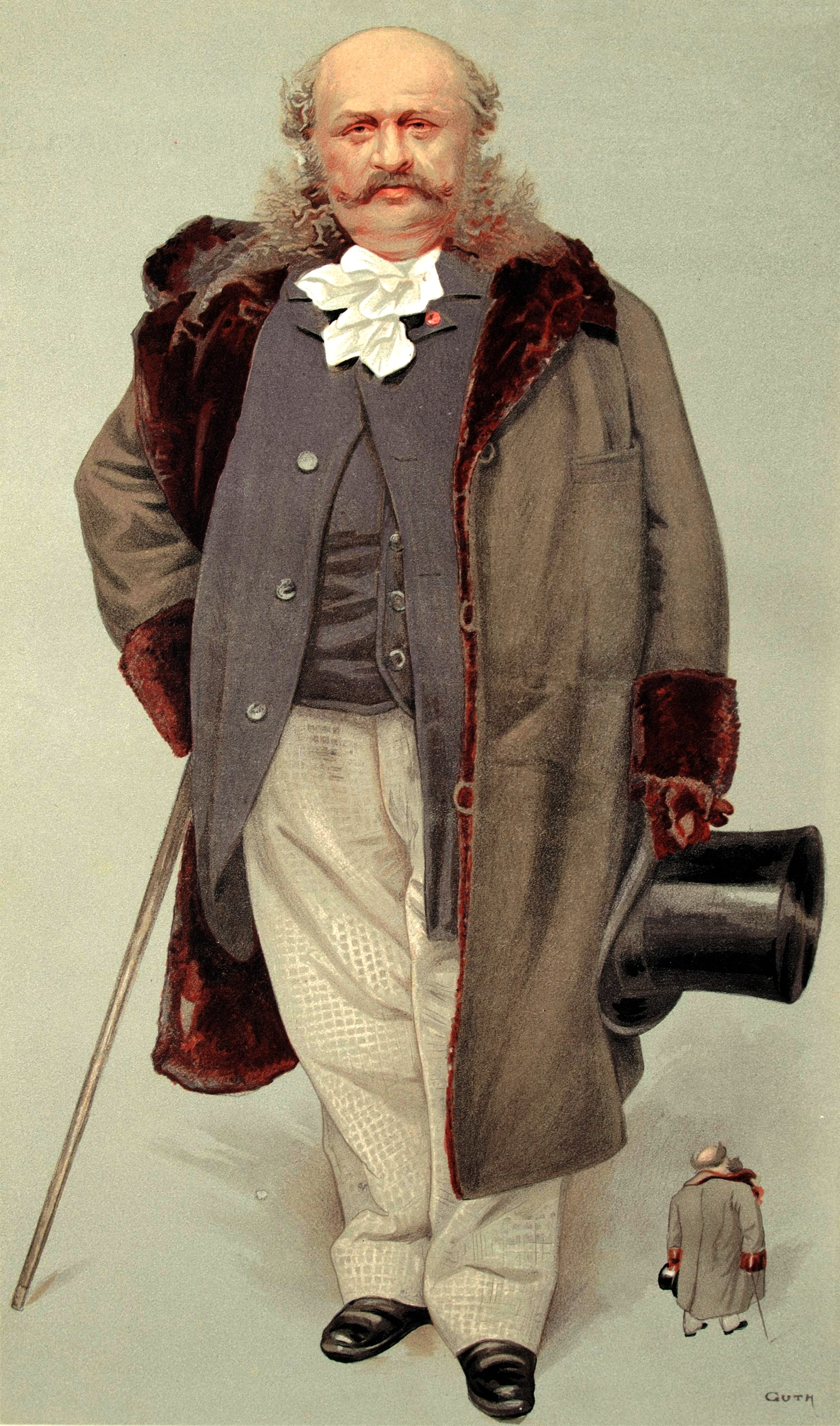
Henri Blowitz, 1889

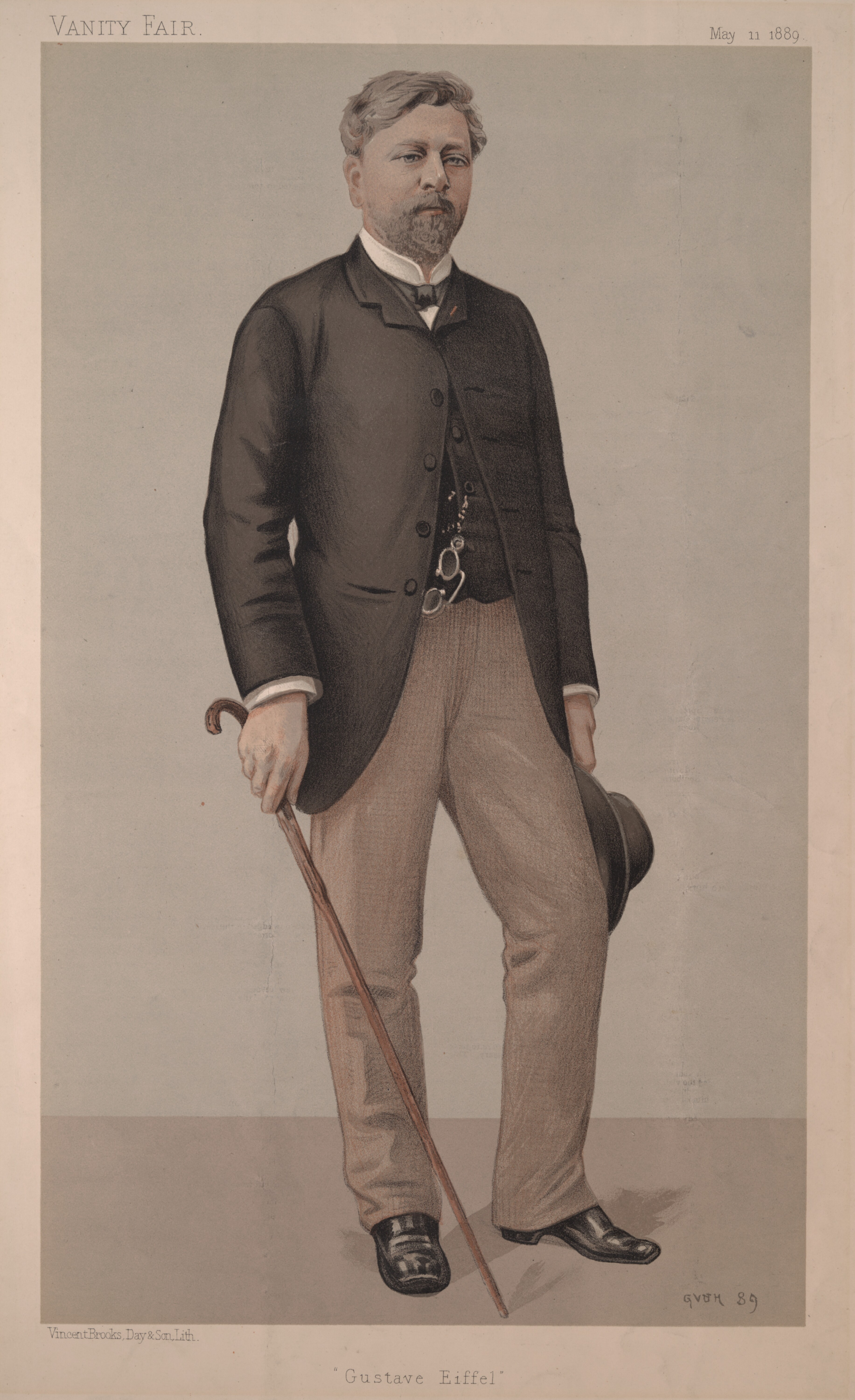
Gustave Eiffel, 1889

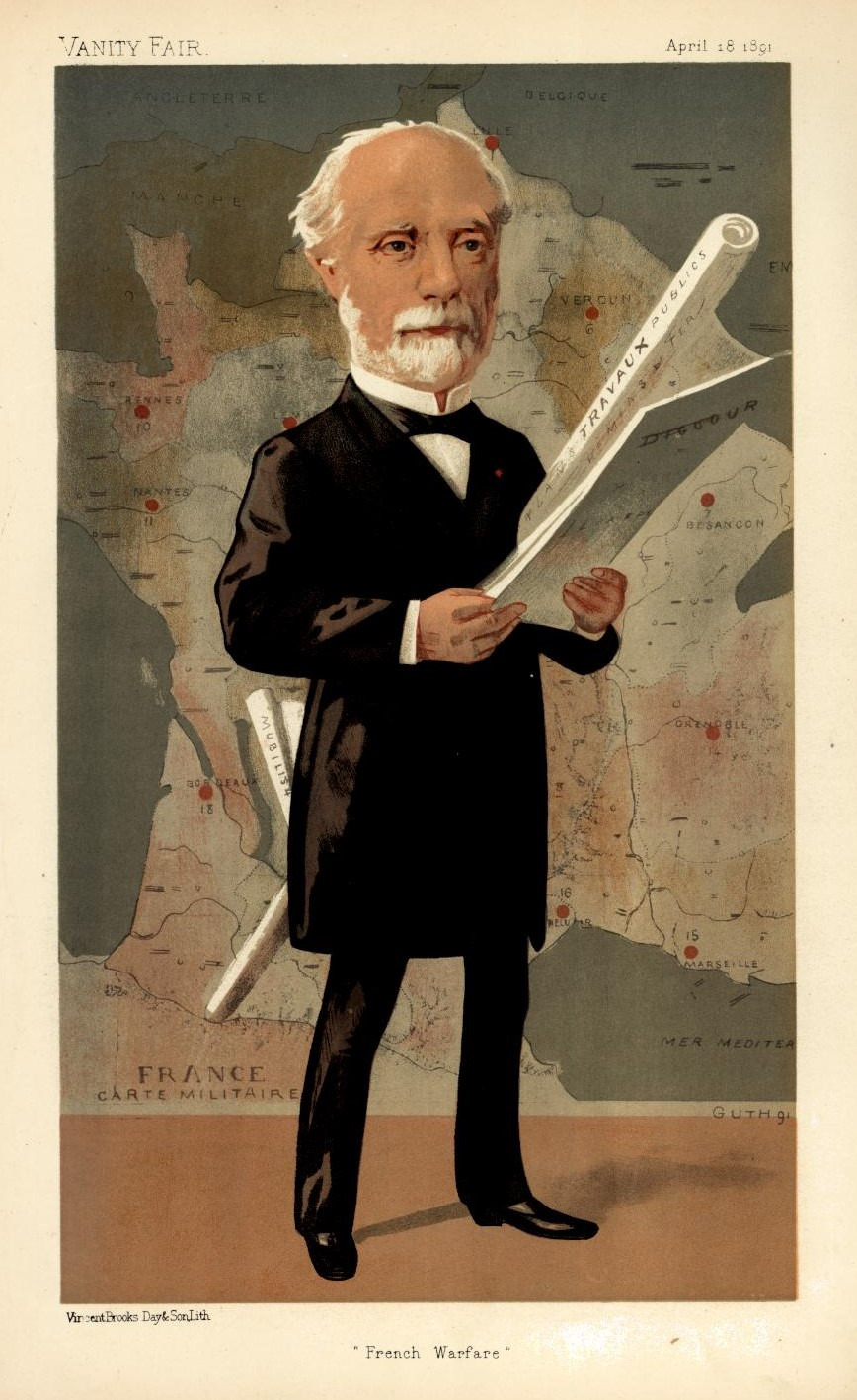
Charles de Freycinet 1891

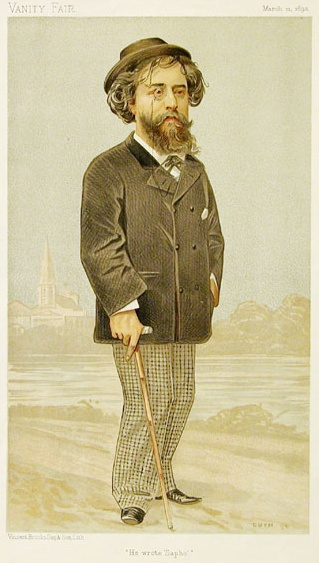
Alphonse Daudet, 1893

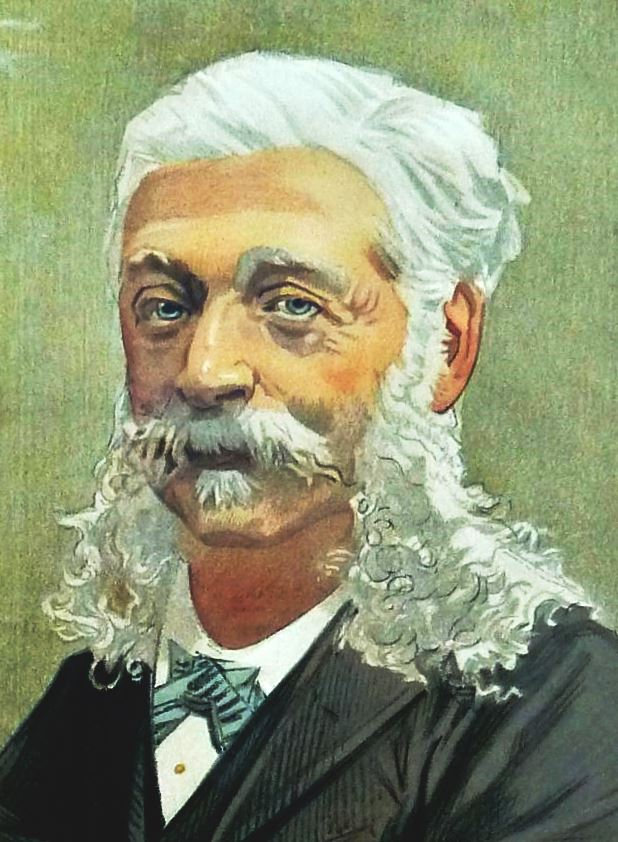
Alphonse James de Rothschild, 1894

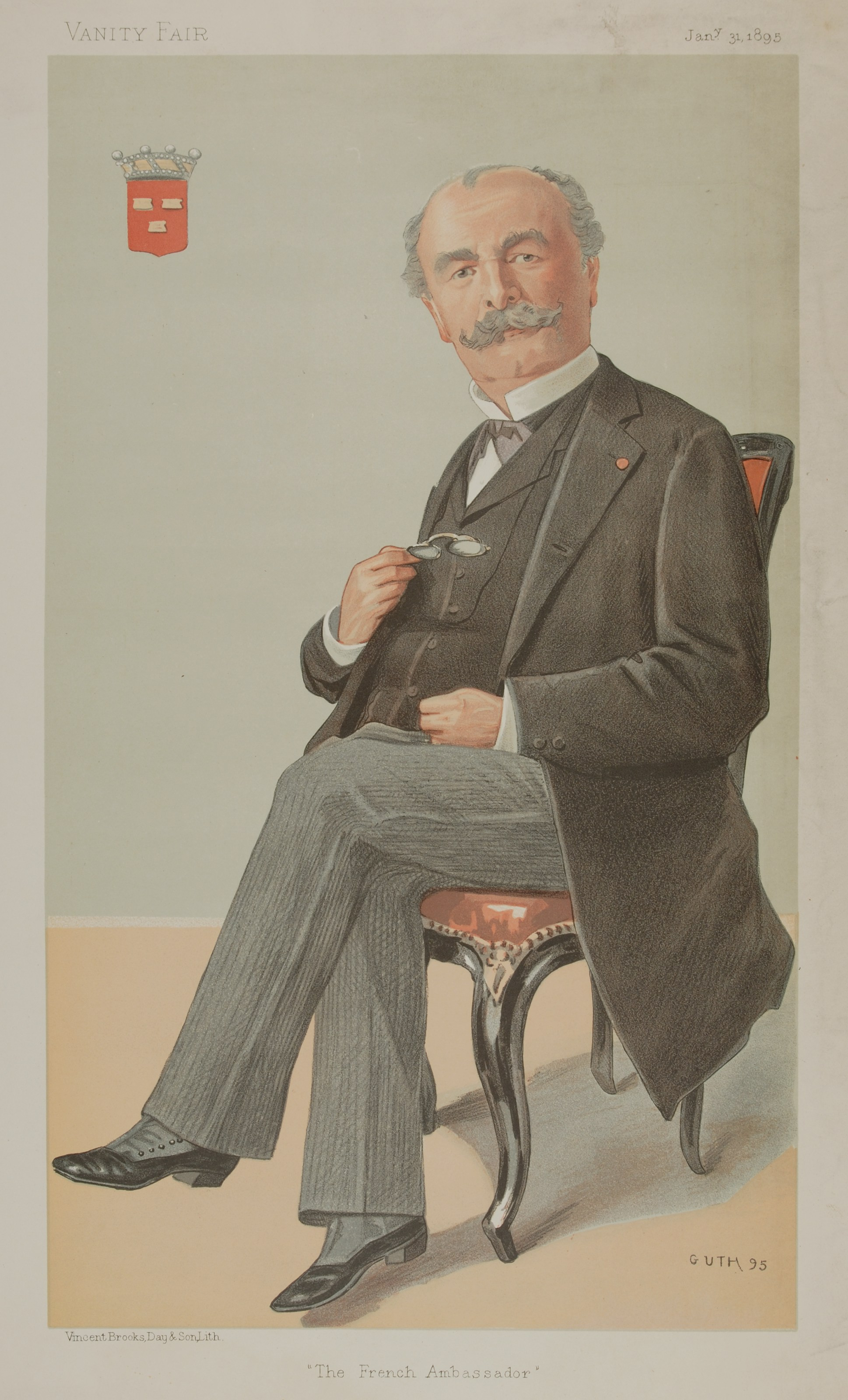
Baron Chaudron de Courcel, 1895

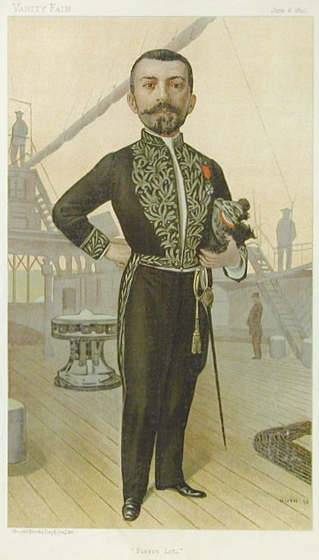
Pierre Loti, 1895

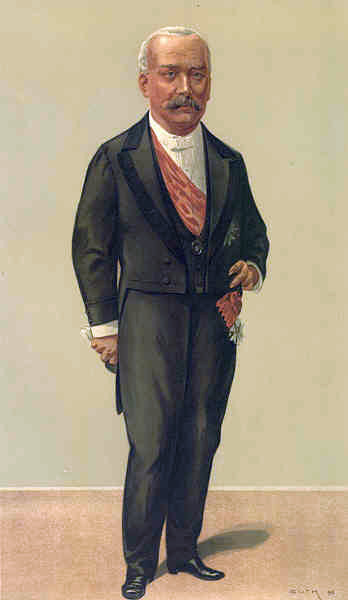
Félix Faure, 1895

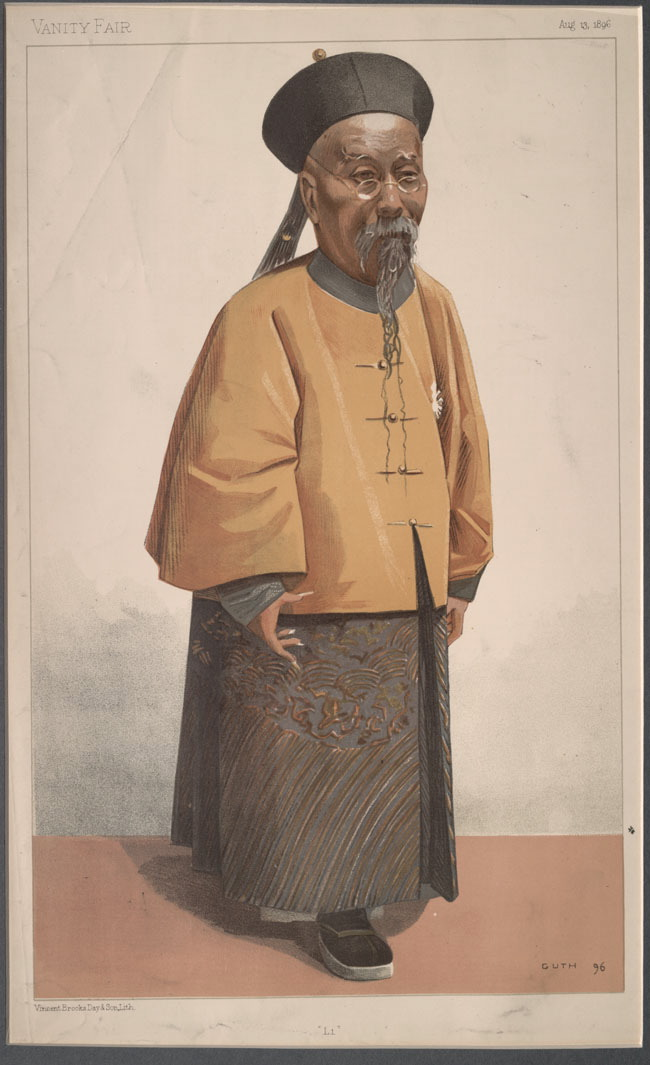
Marquis Li Hung Chang, 1896

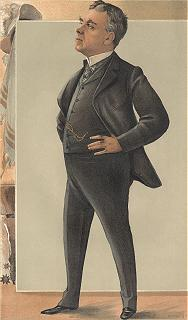
Benoît-Constant Coquelin, 1898

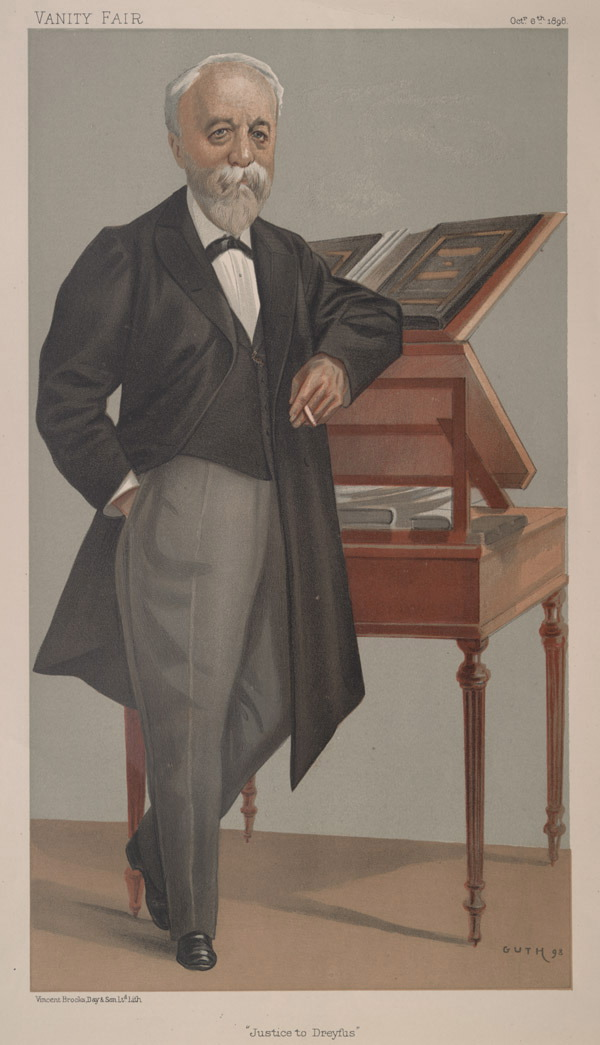
Henri Brisson, 1898

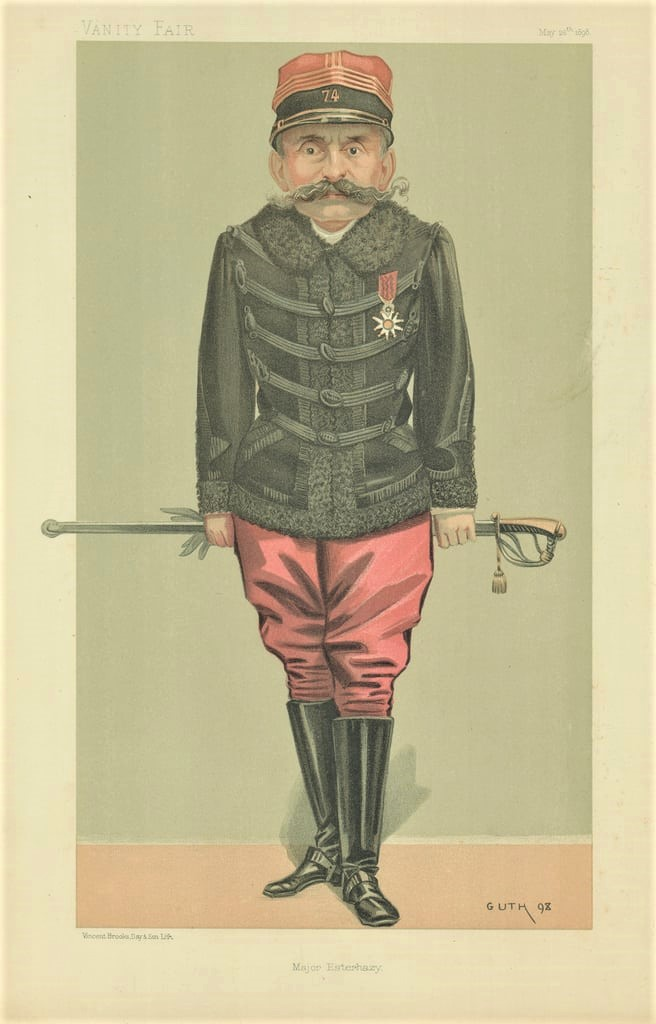
Ferdinand Walsin Esterhazy, 1898

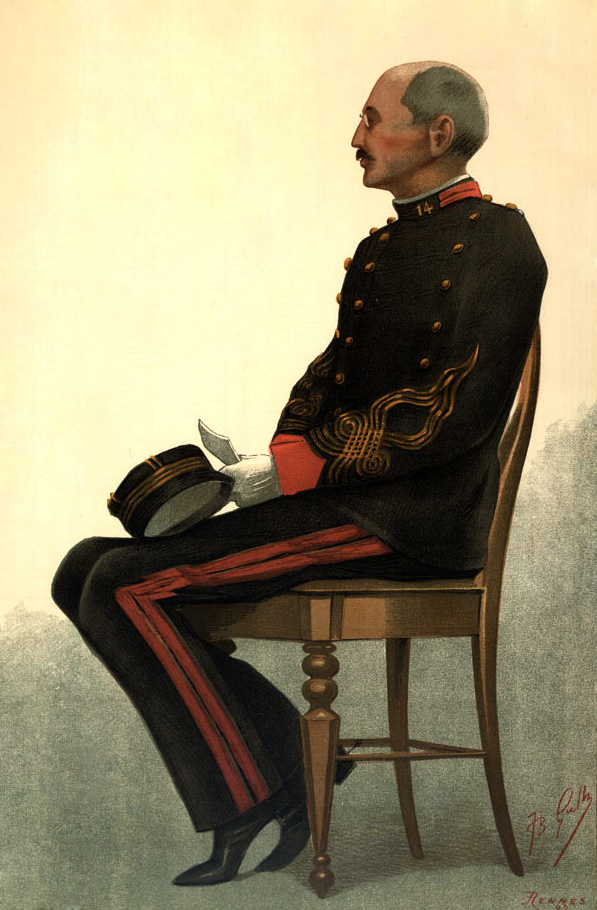
Alfred Dreyfus, 1899

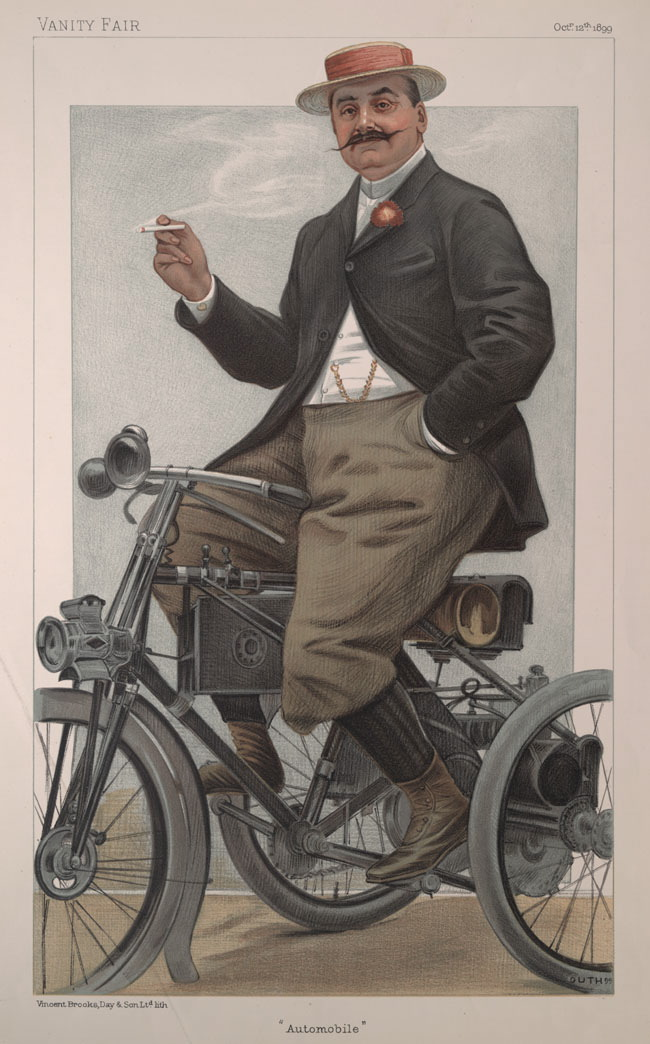
Jules-Albert de Dion, 1899

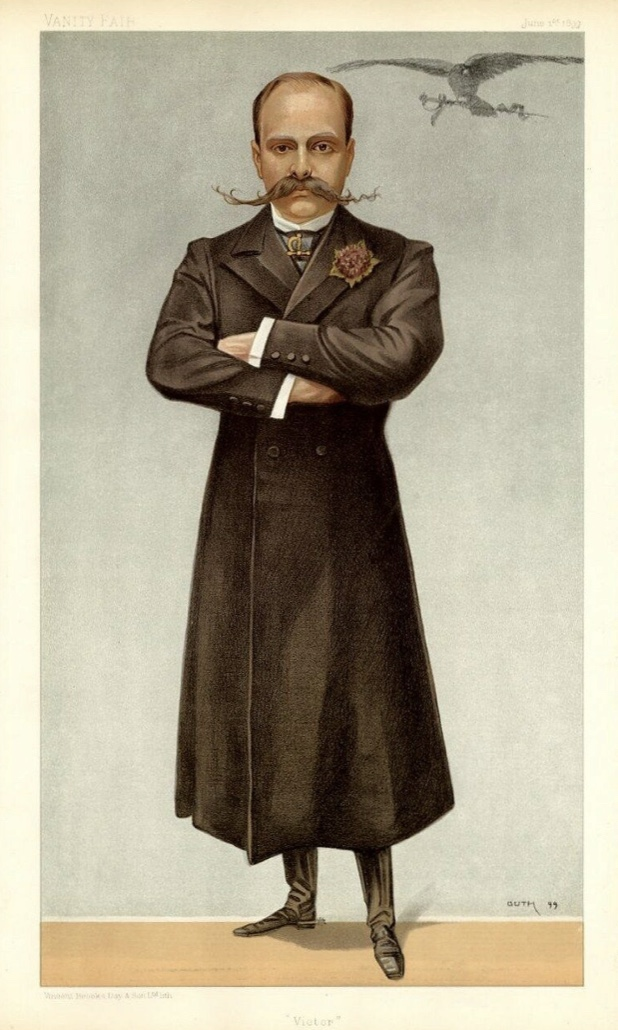
Victor, Prince Napoléon, 1899

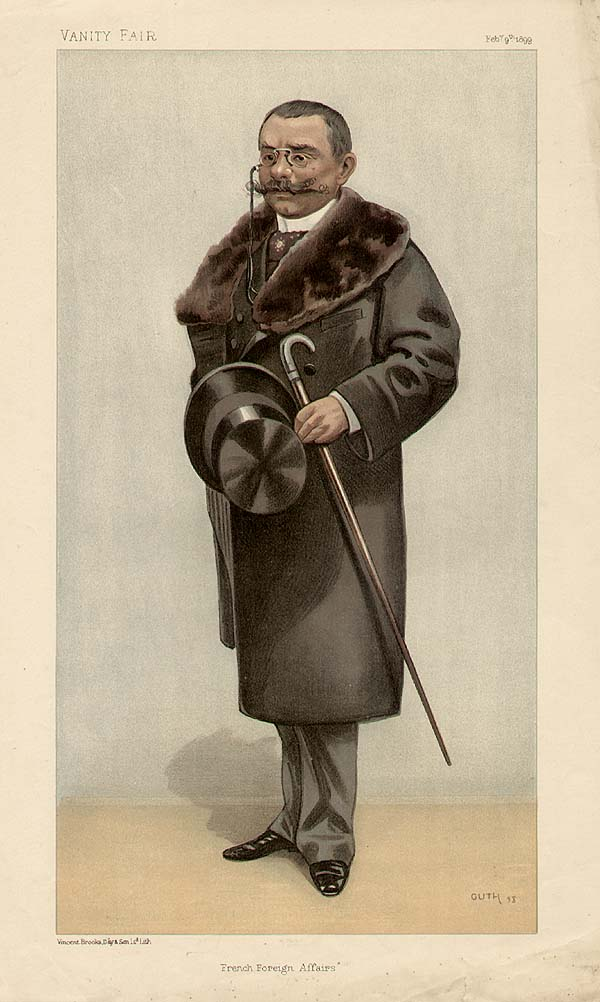
Théophile Delcassé, 1899

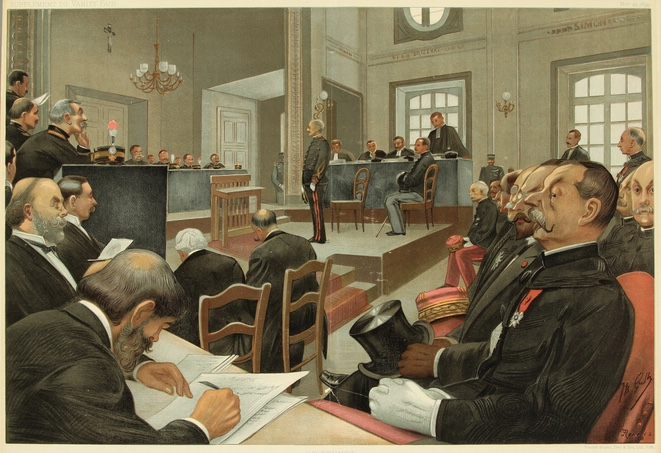
The trial of Dreyfus at Rennes, 1899

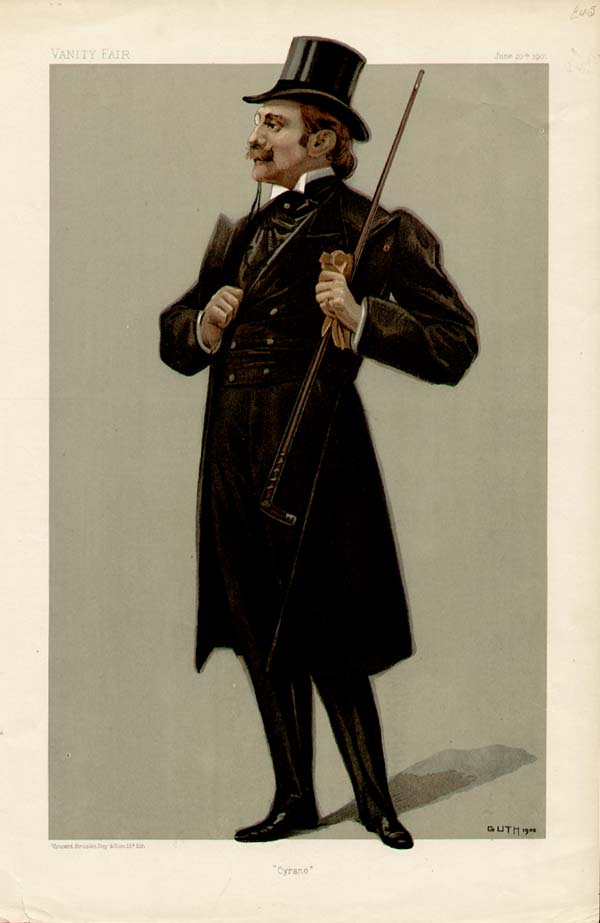
Edmond Rostand, 1901

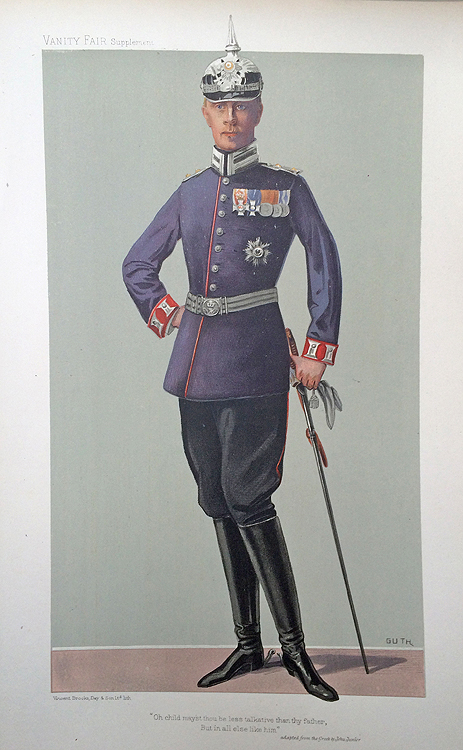
William, Crown Prince of Germany, 1905

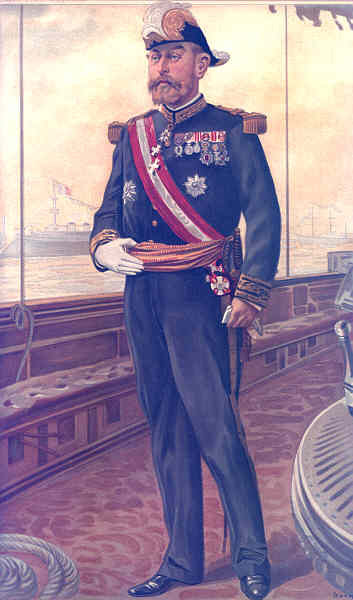
Vice-Admiral Caillard, 1905

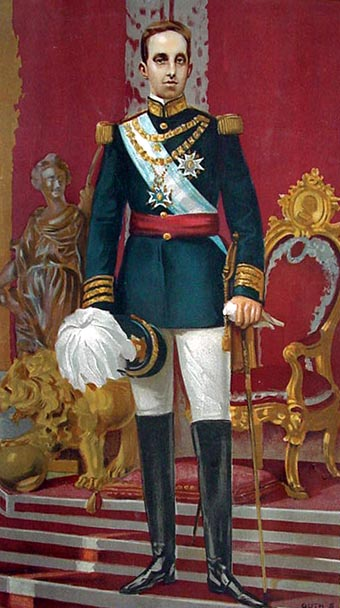
Alfonso XIII of Spain, 1906

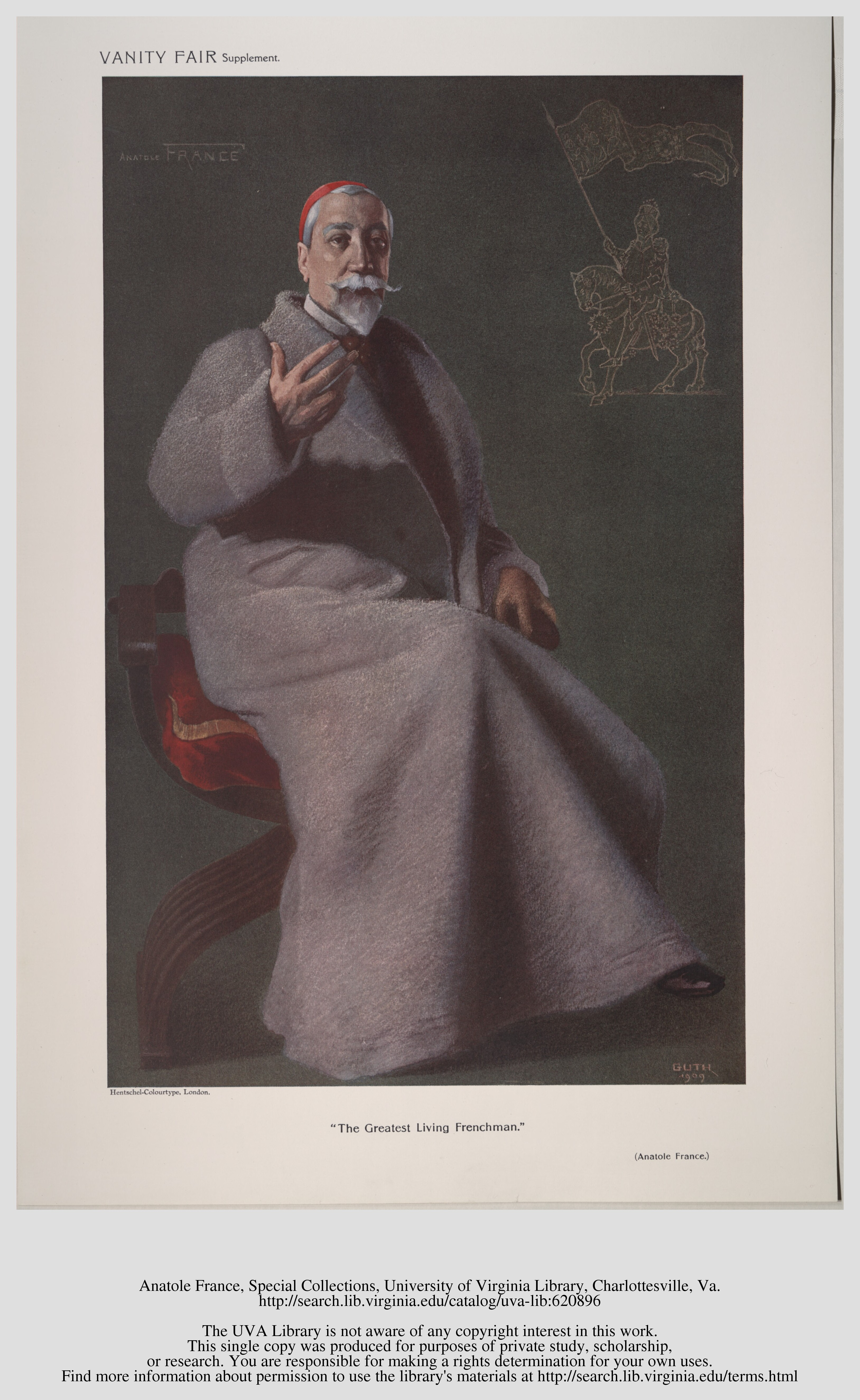
Anatole France, 1909
