= Pierre Gaudin =

French glass painter and mosaic artist

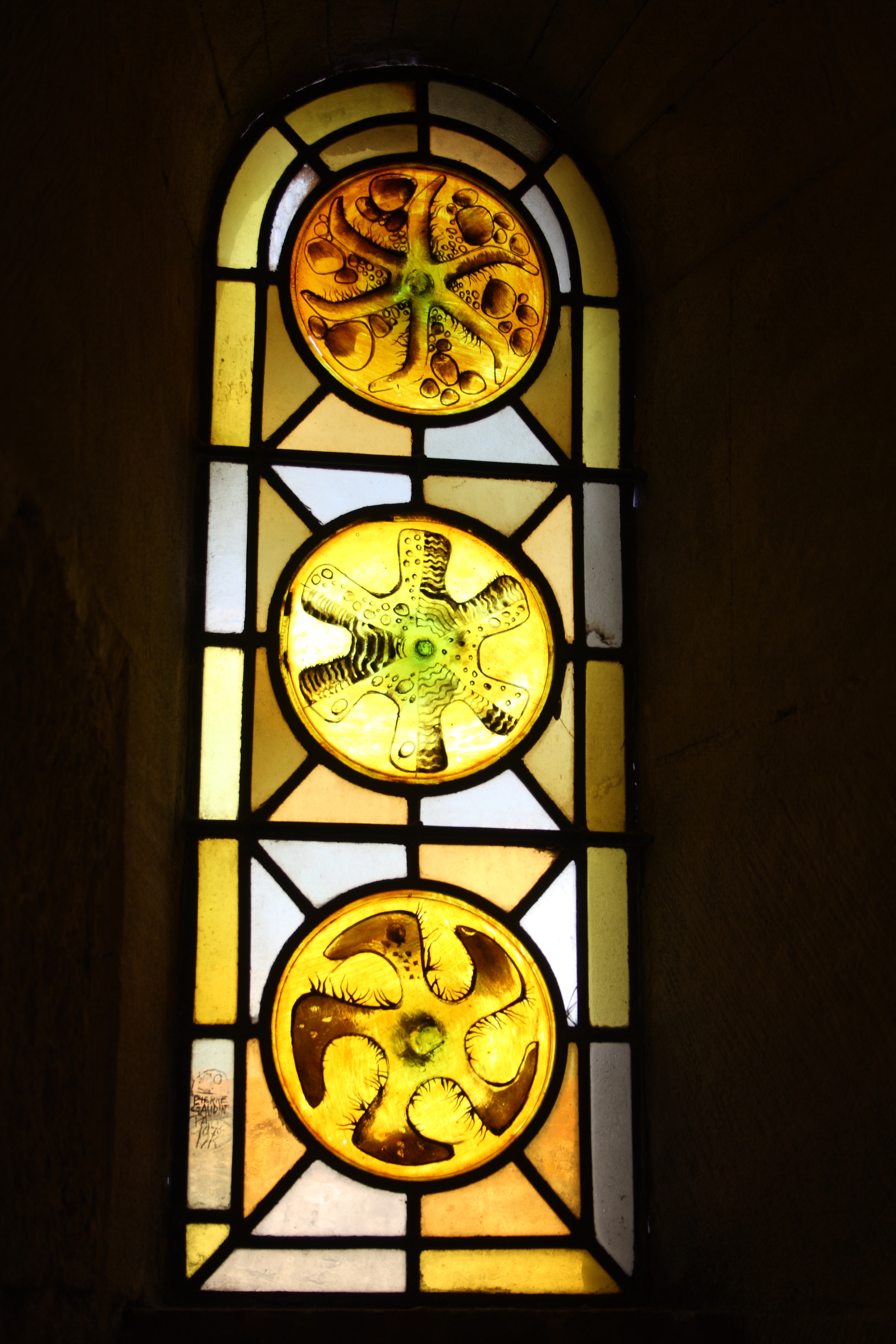
- Stained glass window in the cloister of the Church of St. Trophime in Arles by Pierre Gaudin (1972)
- Born: 6 January 1908; 6th arrondissement of Paris
- Died: 9 April 1973 (aged 65); 20th arrondissement of Paris
- Occupations: Glass painter, Mosaic artist
- Children: Sylvie Gaudin
- Parent: Jean Gaudin

Pierre Gaudin (1908–1973), son of Jean Gaudin (1879–1954) and grandson of Félix Gaudin (1851–1930) was a glass painter and mosaic artist. His studio executed mosaic designs and stained-glass windows for the Basilica of St. Thérèse, Lisieux. Gaudin had a daughter, Sylvie Gaudin and Catherine Aboulian

== Works ==
- Stained glass windows for the Basilica of St. Thérèse, Lisieux
- Stained glass windows for the Église Saint-Martin in Villers-Bocage.
- Stained glass windows for Basilica of Sr. Michael, Bordeaux
