= Maurice W. Goding =

High Commissioner of the Trust Territory of the Pacific Islands

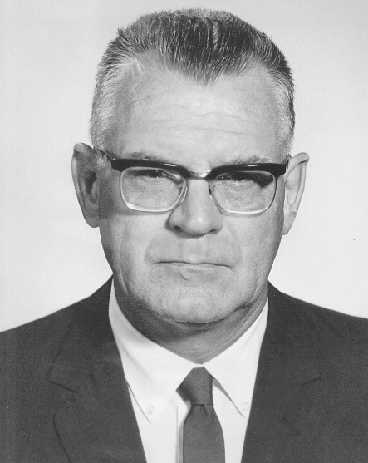
1960s portrait photograph

Maurice Wilfred Goding (September 21, 1911 – September 14, 1998) was an American lawyer and government official. He served as High Commissioner for the Trust Territory of the Pacific Islands from May 1, 1961, to May 27, 1966.

== Life and career ==
Goding was born in Skagway, Alaska. He graduated from Yankton College in South Dakota in 1933. In the 1930s, he taught public school in South Dakota and Alaska and served as an inspector for the U.S. Customs Service in Alaska. He served on staff for Congressman A.J. Dimond from 1940 to 1942. During World War II he served on the Board of Economic Warfare. In 1944 he was appointed Assistant Chief (and Acting Chief) Alaska Branch, Division of Territories and Island Possessions, for the Office of the Secretary of the United States Department of the Interior. He became involved in further development of American interests in the Pacific after the war.

Goding earned a law degree from George Washington University in 1950. He continued in staff positions with the Department of the Interior until he was appointed United States High Commissioner, Trust Territory of the Pacific Islands by President John F. Kennedy. His work focused on developing education, transportation, and a new central legislative body, the Congress of Micronesia.

Goding retired in 1966 and received an honorary Doctors of Laws degree from the University of Alaska in 1968. He later moved to Stuttgart, Arkansas, where he died of pneumonia in 1998.
