= Joe Keogh =

American judge and politician

Member of the Louisiana House of Representatives
- In office 1964–1968

Personal details
- Born: January 13, 1932 McComb, Mississippi, U.S.
- Died: May 15, 1996 (aged 64) Baton Rouge, Louisiana, U.S.
- Party: Democratic
- Spouse: Julie Keogh
- Education: Louisiana State University
- Occupation: Judge

Joe Keogh (January 13, 1932 – May 15, 1996) was an American judge and politician. He served as a Democratic member of the Louisiana House of Representatives.

== Life and career ==
Keogh was born in McComb, Mississippi. He attended Louisiana State University.

In 1964, Keogh was elected to the Louisiana House of Representatives, serving until 1968. He was a judge for Louisiana's 19th Judicial Court.

Keogh died in May 1996 at the Baton Rouge General Hospital in Baton Rouge, Louisiana, at the age of 64.
