= Lectoure =

- Commune
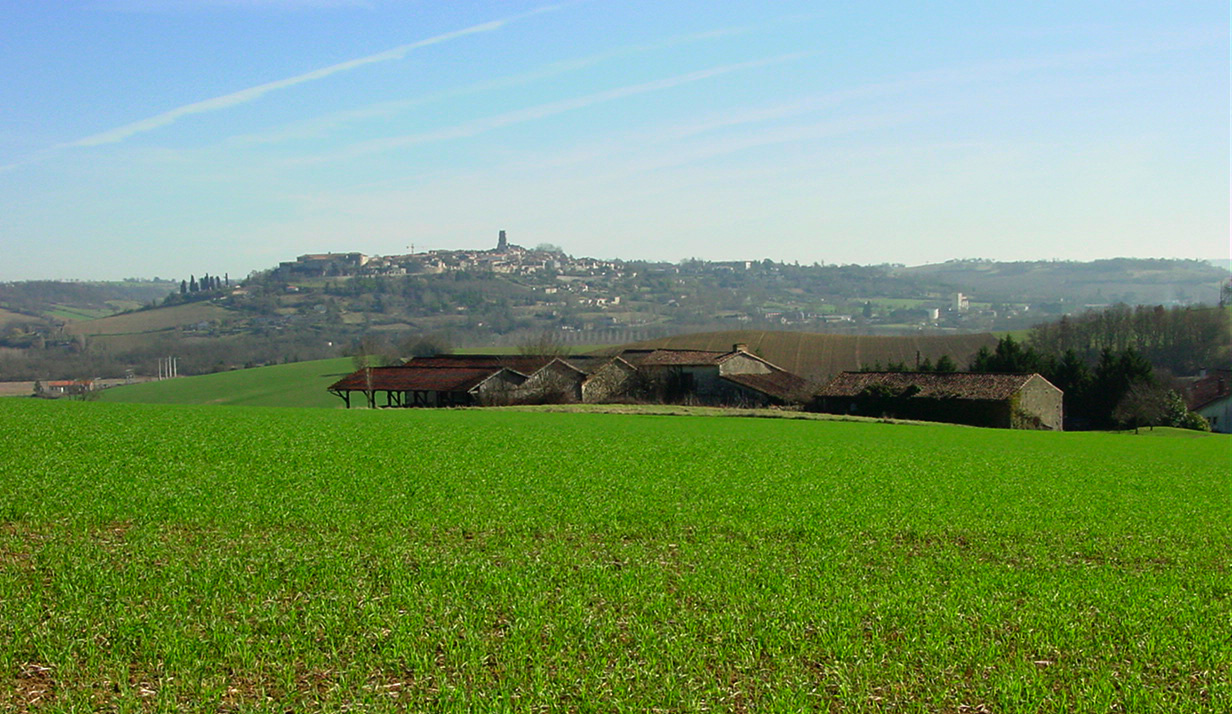
- A general view of Lectoure

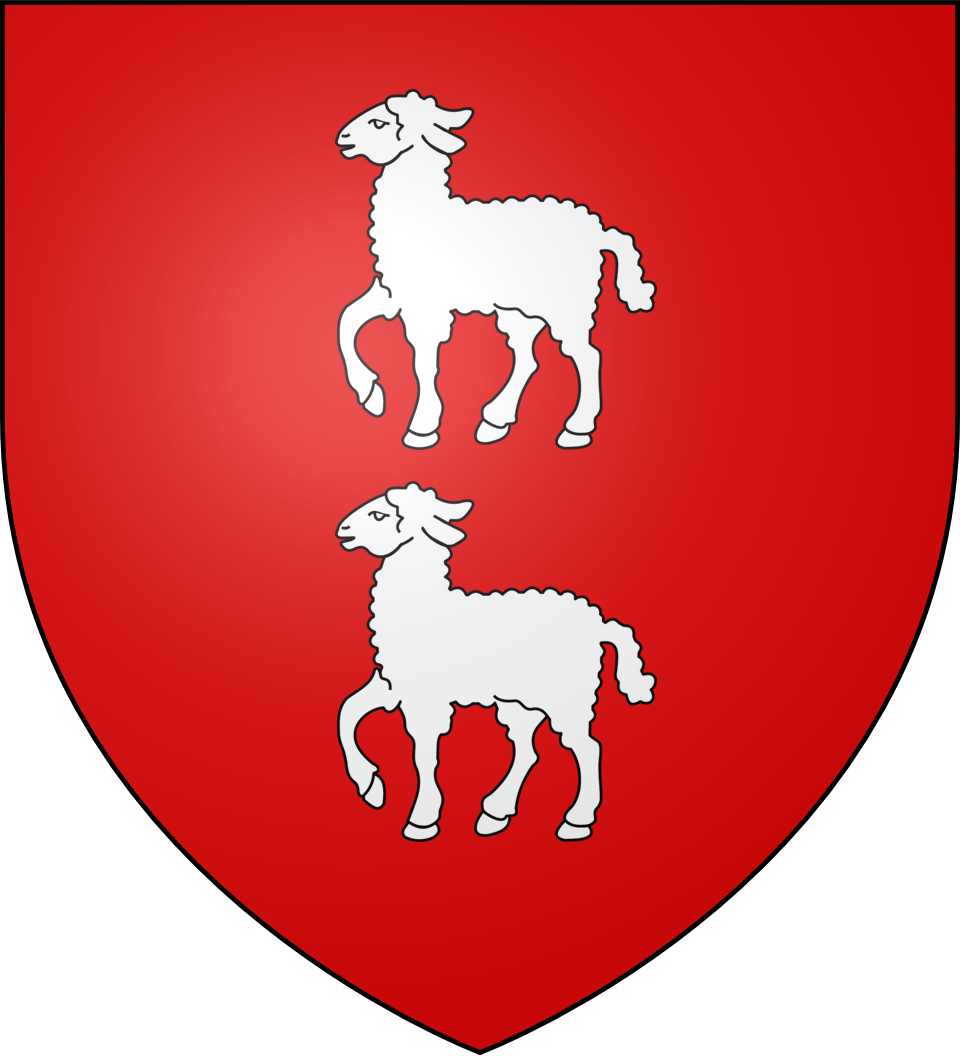
- Coat of arms
- Location of Lectoure
- Location within France Location within Occitanie
- Coordinates: 43°56′07″N 0°37′19″E
- Country: France
- Region: Occitania
- Department: Gers
- Arrondissement: Condom
- Canton: Lectoure-Lomagne

Government
  - Mayor (2021–2026): Xavier Ballenghien
- Area^{1}: 84.93 km^{2} (32.79 sq mi)
- Elevation: 182 m (597 ft)
- Highest elevation: 223 m (732 ft)
- Lowest elevation: 68 m (223 ft)
- Population (2023): 3,670
  - Density: 43.2/km^{2} (112/sq mi)
- Time zone: UTC+01:00 (CET)
  - Summer (DST): UTC+02:00 (CEST)
- INSEE/Postal code: 32208 /32700
- ^{1} French Land Register data, which excludes lakes, ponds, glaciers > 1 km^{2} (0.386 sq mi or 247 acres) and river estuaries.

Lectoure (French pronunciation: [lɛktuʁ]; Gascon: Leitora [lejˈtuɾɔ]; Latin Lactora) is a commune in the Gers department in the Occitanie region in southwestern France.

It is located 32 km (20 mi) north of Auch, the capital of the department, 30 km (19 mi) south of Agen and approximately 76 km (47 mi) northwest of Toulouse.

In 1473, the seneschal, the crown's agent of order, was created for the county of Armagnac. The building out of which the seneschal operated, Seneschalcy of Armagnac, was built in the commune of Lectoure. The position/building remained active until the French Revolution, in which it was abolished and abandoned by 1835.

== Geography ==
The village is located on the right bank of the Gers, which flows north through the western part of the commune. The river Auroue forms part of the commune's southeastern and northeastern borders.

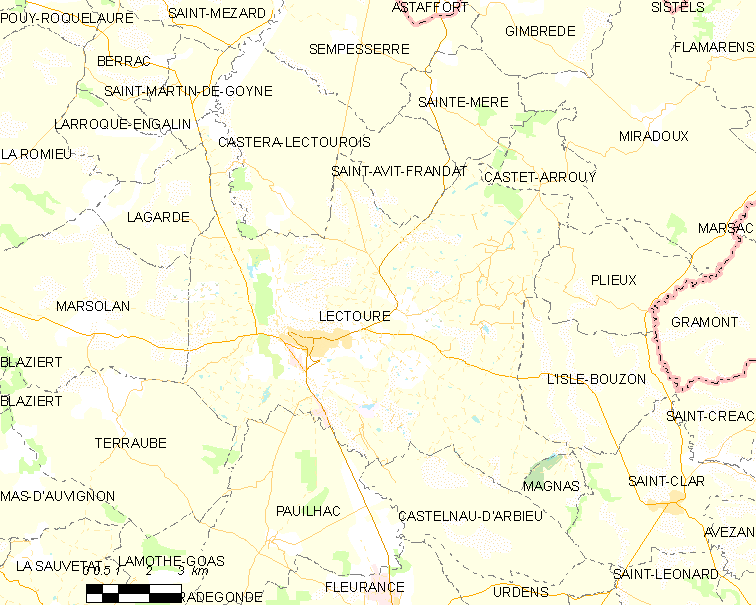
Lectoure and its surrounding communes

== History ==
Lectoure was a prehistoric oppidum, capital of Lactorates. Barbarian invasions forced residents to raise the walls and make Lectoure a stronghold for centuries. The town became the capital city of the Earldom of Armagnac in 1325, ruled by a powerful family descended from the ancient Dukes of Gascony, who held court at Lectoure. In 1473 Cardinal Jean de Jouffroy besieged the town on behalf of Louis XI. and after its fall put the whole population to the sword. In 1562 it again suffered severely at the hands of the Catholics under Blaise de Montluc.

== Population ==
Historical population
Year	Pop.	±% p.a.
1968	3,950	—
1975	3,790	−0.59%
1982	3,923	+0.49%
1990	4,034	+0.35%
1999	3,933	−0.28%
2007	3,771	−0.52%
2012	3,753	−0.10%
2017	3,664	−0.48%
2023	3,670	+0.03%
Source: INSEE

== Sites of interest ==
Lectoure has been designated as a "town of art and history" (French: Villes et Pays d'Art et d'Histoire) by the French Ministry of Culture and Communication since 1985. The 12th-16th century former Lectoure Cathedral is a national monument. The town hall was built between 1676 and 1682 by bishop Hugues de Bar.

== Way of St. James ==
Lectoure is a town on the Via Podiensis, one of the three major French arms of the Way of St. James. This route is followed by those making the pilgrimage from Le Puy by way of Saint-Jean-Pied-de-Port to Santiago de Compostela in northwest Spain. Pilgrims arrive at Lectoure after Miradoux and next pass through Marsolan and La Romieu.

== Cuisine ==
Locally produced Armagnac and foie gras are available and popular delicacies.

== Notable people ==
- Pierre Charron
- Pierre Feuga, writer, translator
- Pey de Garros
- Joseph Lagrange
- Jean Lannes
- Paul Noël Lasseran
- Antoine de Roquelaure
- Aurélie Soubiran, Princess Ghika (1820–1904), writer.

== See also ==
- Lectoure Cathedral
- Communes of the Gers department
