= Félix Gaudin =

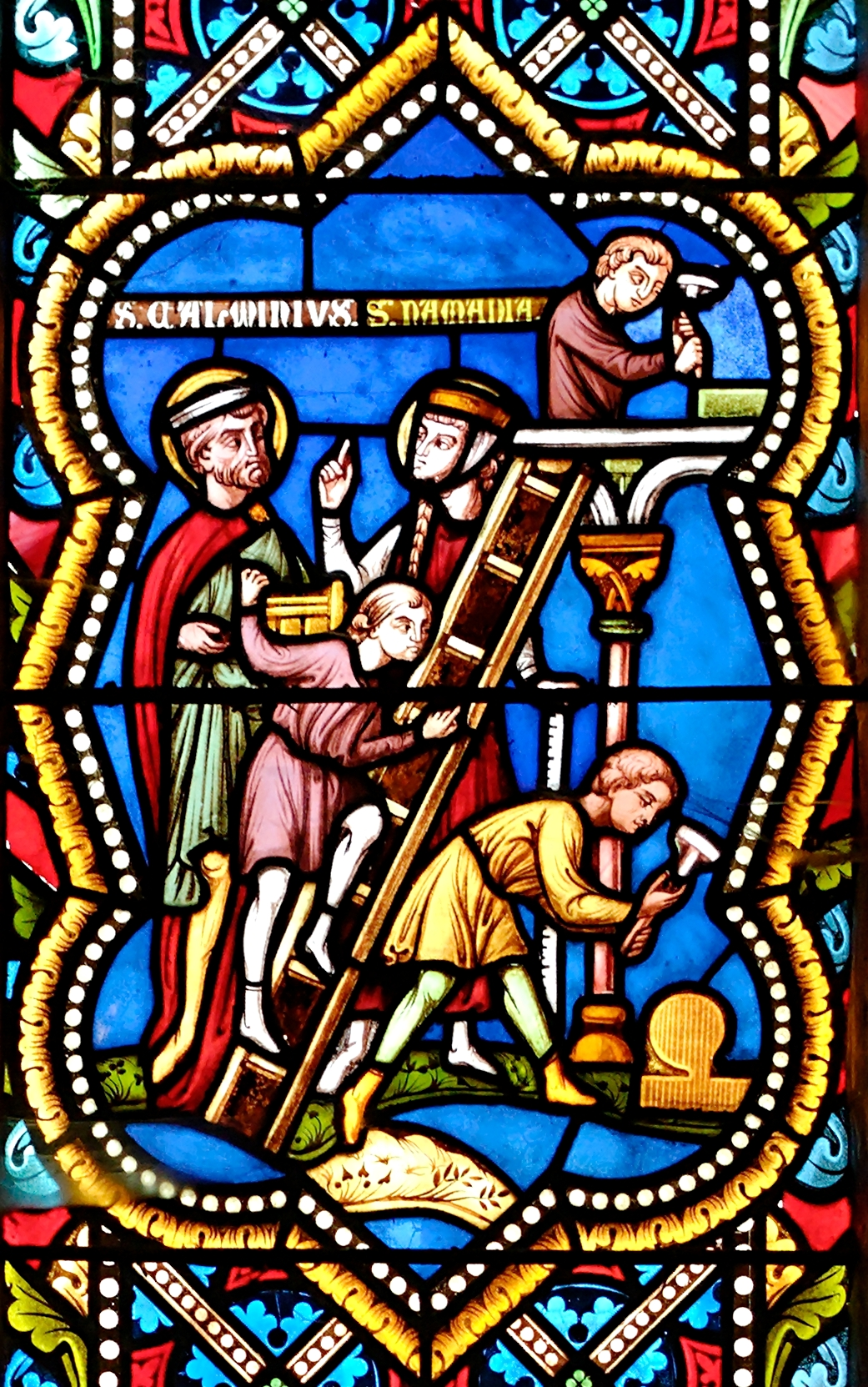
Stained glass window by Félix Gaudin: St. Calminius and St. Namadia, in the abbey church in Mozac.

Félix Gaudin (10 February 1851 in Paris–15 September 1930 in Châtenoy-le-Royal) was a stained glass artist in France. He was the father of Jean Gaudin and grandfather of Pierre Gaudin.

Gaudin was an early employer of Jean Baptiste Guth.
