= Lectoure Cathedral =

Roman Catholic church in the town of Lectoure, France

Coordinates: 43°56′2″N 0°37′26″E

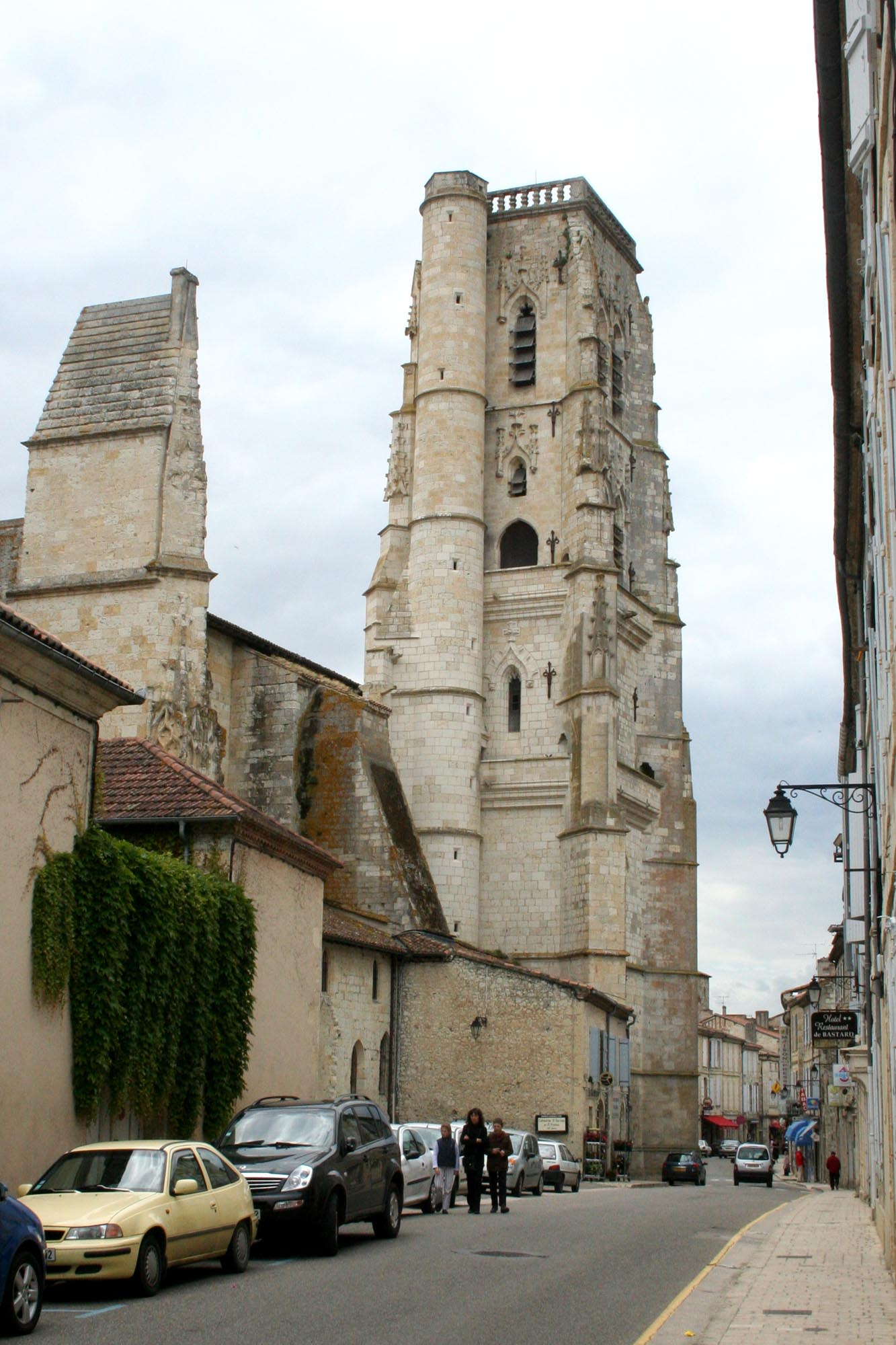
Lectoure Cathedral

Lectoure Cathedral (Cathédrale Saint-Gervais-et-Saint-Protais de Lectoure) is a Roman Catholic church in the town of Lectoure, France. It is a national monument. It was the seat of the former Diocese of Lectoure. The cathedral is divided under the Concordat of 1801 between the Diocese of Agen and the Archdiocese of Toulouse.

== Building history ==
The former cathedral dominates the town and the belfry tower of 1488 can be seen at a distance as the town is approached. The repairs and modifications of the cathedral go back to the 12th century. The unadorned west front erected in the 15th century has been modified through the ages, and niches above the door have all but melted away due to the fragility of the limestone.

The nave was vaulted at the end of the 12th century, then repaired in 1480. Vaulted chapels were added at the beginning of the 16th century and more alterations followed in the 17th and 18th centuries. The choir and apse were also reconstructed at the beginning of the 16th century, and the five square apsidal chapels were completed. The ambulatory was created in 1600 by introducing ten cylindrical piers, and the carved early 17th-century choir stalls were placed here in the 19th century. The stained glass is typically 19th century with a Tree of Jesse in the Chapelle de la Sainte Famille.
