= Clark Gaudin =

American politician (1931–2020)

Member of the Louisiana House of Representatives
- In office 1967–1968
- Preceded by: Luther F. Cole
- Succeeded by: Lillian Walker
- In office 1972–1992
- Preceded by: Lillian Walker
- Succeeded by: Chuck McMains

Personal details
- Born: Edward Clark Gaudin; December 26, 1931
- Died: March 19, 2020 (aged 88)
- Party: Republican
- Spouse(s): Marianne Hurst (died. 1992) Shirley Armetta
- Children: 3
- Education: Louisiana State University; Paul M. Hebert Law Center

Edward Clark Gaudin (December 26, 1931 – March 19, 2020) was an American politician. He served as a Republican member of the Louisiana House of Representatives.

== Life and career ==
Gaudin attended Louisiana State University and Paul M. Hebert Law Center. He served in the United States Army during the Korean War.

In 1967, Gaudin was elected to the Louisiana House of Representatives, winning a special election to complete Luther F. Cole's leftover term, serving until 1968, when he was succeeded by Lillian Walker. In 1972, he was elected again, succeeding Walker. He served until 1992, when he was succeeded by Chuck McMains.

Gaudin died in March 2020, at the age of 88.
