= Paul Noël Lasseran =

French painter, decorator, and poet

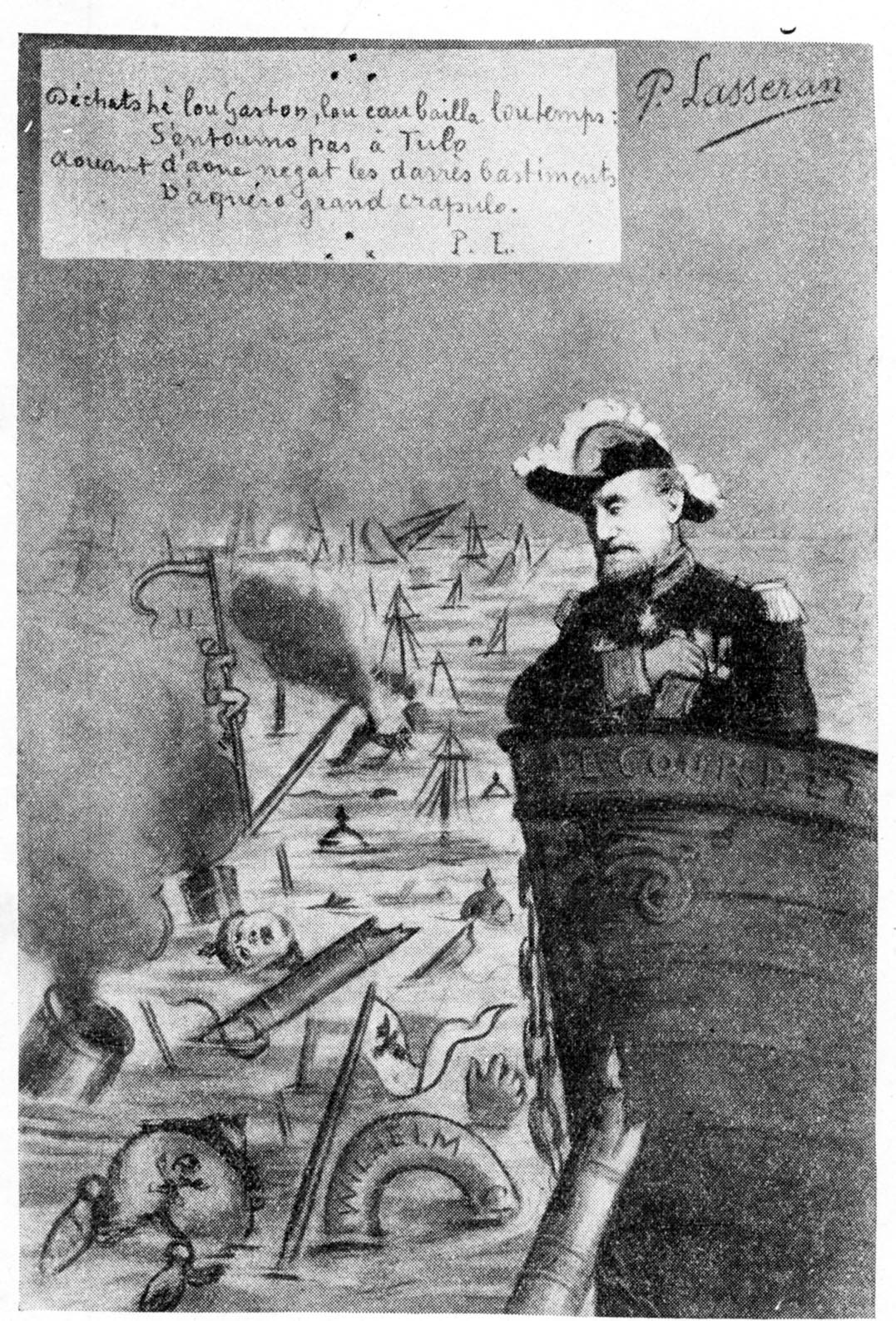
Admiral Boué de Lapeyère, drawing and poem by Paul Noël Lasséran, 1915

Paul Noël Lasseran (1868 – 17 February 1933) was a French painter, decorator and poet from Lectoure. He is best known for his murals and decor in various churches throughout Gers. These include Chapelle des Carmélites, Lectoure (1889), Église paroissiale Saint-Jean-Baptiste de Goutz (1901–1903), Église Sainte-Blandine, Castet-Arrouy (1901) and Église Saint-Christophe, Masseube (Gers) 1932–1933.

== Bibliography ==
- Deux siècles d'Histoire de Lectoure (1780–1980), Syndicat d'initiative, Lectoure, 1981.
- Paul Lasseran, artiste peintre surtout : La Taverne pendant la guerre, Albi, Imprimerie des Orphelins Apprentis, 1915
