= Jean Gaudin (glass artist) =

French artist

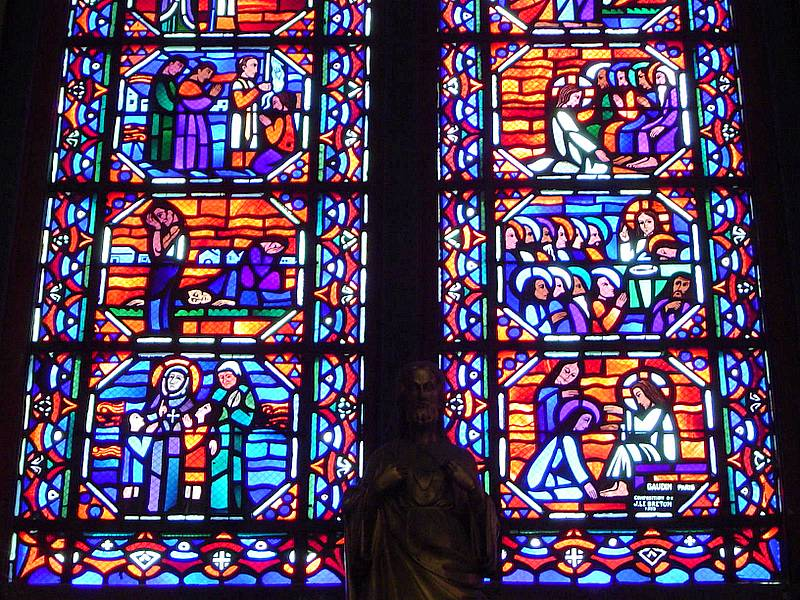
- Art Deco stained glass by Jean Gaudin in chapelle du Sacré-Cœur. Amiens Cathedral (1933)
- Born: Ernest Jean Gaudin; November 10, 1879; Clermont-Ferrand, France
- Died: November 16, 1954 (aged 75); Paris, France
- Known for: art-deco stained glass windows
- Children: Pierre Gaudin
- Family: Sylvie Gaudin - Grand daughter

Ernest Jean Gaudin (November 10, 1879 - November 16, 1954) was a French painter, glass and mosaic artist.

He was the son of Félix Gaudin, from whom he bought the stained glass and mosaic studio in 1909, and was the father of Pierre Gaudin (1908-1973) and grandfather of Sylvie Gaudin. He was born in Clermont-Ferrand, France and died in Paris, France.

His Art Deco stained glass windows are found in many churches, including Amiens Cathedral.

== Works ==
- Stained glass window in Amiens Cathedral
- L'église Saint Louis de Rouvroy : stained glass windows
- The church of Saint-Julien, Domfront (Orne), interior decoration
- The funeral chapel of the Berny family, Guiscard (Oise) cemetery; mosaics and stained glass windows.
- The church of Limé (Aisne); mosaics.
- The church of Saint Vaast, Moreuil (Somme); mosaics.
- The Église Saint-Jean-Bosco (Paris); stained-glass windows.
- L'Église Notre-Dame des Alpes in Saint-Gervais-les-Bains; decoration.
- The crypt of the Basilica of St. Thérèse, Lisieux, (Calvados).
- The church of Notre-Dame, Rocquigny, Pas-de-Calais, stained-glass windows.

== Bibliography ==
- Luneau, Jean-François (2006). Félix Gaudin - peintre-verrier et mosaïste 1851-1930 (in French). Presses Universitaires Blaise-Pascal. ISBN 2845162847.
