= Wayne Gaudin =

American politician (1920–1999)

Member of the Louisiana House of Representatives
- In office 1956–1960

Personal details
- Born: Wallace Wayne Gaudin; August 25, 1920 Fort Ringgold, Texas, U.S.
- Died: September 28, 1999 (aged 79) Baton Rouge, Louisiana
- Party: Democratic
- Education: Louisiana State University

Wallace Wayne Gaudin (August 25, 1920 – September 28, 1999) was an American politician. A member of the Democratic Party, he served in the Louisiana House of Representatives from 1956 to 1960.

== Life and career ==
Gaudin was born in Fort Ringgold, Texas, the son of Ulice Gaudin and Clare Gautreau. He served in the armed forces during World War II, which after his discharge, he attended and graduated from Louisiana State University.

Gaudin served in the Louisiana House of Representatives from 1956 to 1960.

== Death ==
Gaudin died on September 28, 1999, in Baton Rouge, Louisiana, at the age of 79.
