= Jack Dyer (politician) =

American politician (1924–2003)

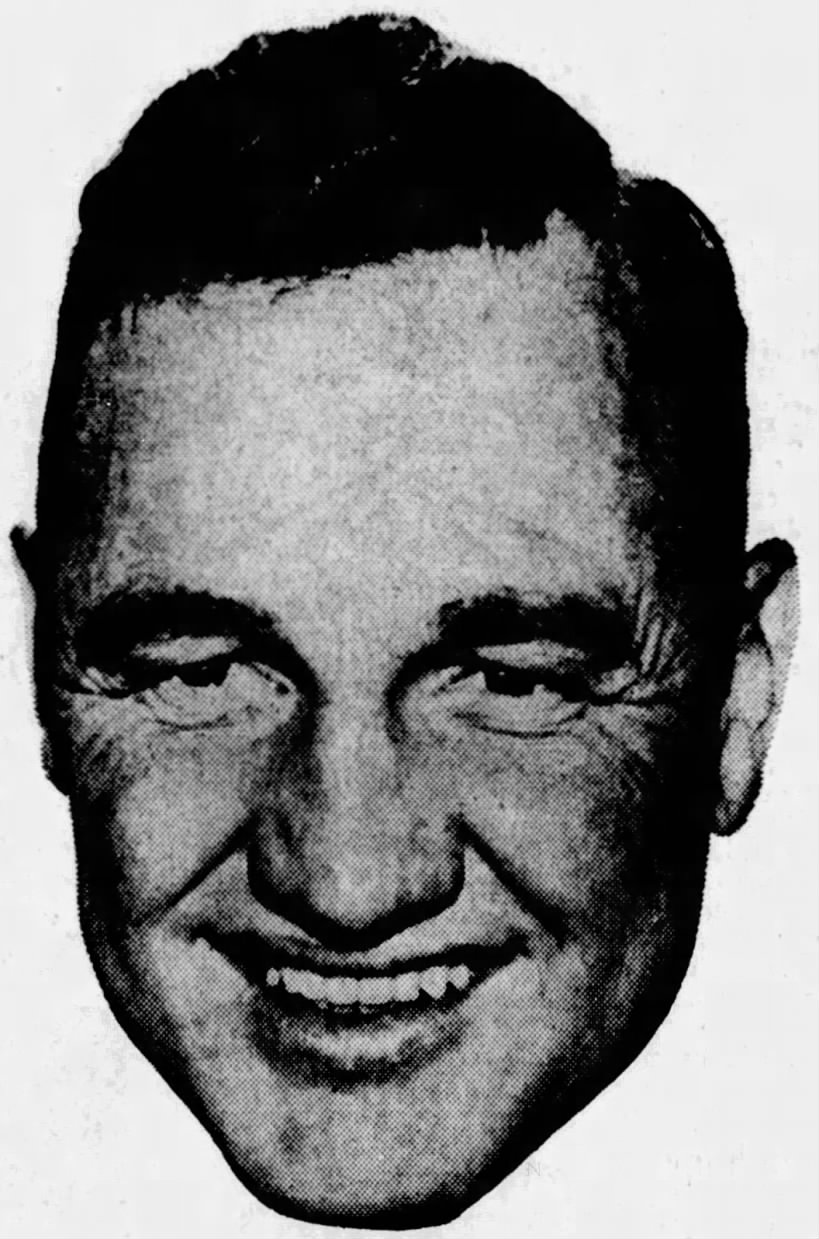

Member of the Louisiana House of Representatives
- In office 1960–1964

Personal details
- Born: Jack Nelson Dyer; July 29, 1924 East Baton Rouge Parish, Louisiana, U.S.
- Died: August 10, 2003 (aged 79) Foley, Alabama, U.S.
- Party: Democratic
- Education: Louisiana State University

Jack Nelson Dyer (July 29, 1924 – August 10, 2003) was an American politician. A member of the Democratic Party, he served in the Louisiana House of Representatives from 1960 to 1964.

== Life and career ==
Dyer was born in East Baton Rouge Parish, Louisiana, the son of William Dyer and Cynthia Singleton. He attended Istrouma High School, graduating in 1942. After graduating, he served in the United States Army during World War II, which after his discharge, he attended Louisiana State University, earning his B.A and LL.B degrees.

Dyer served in the Louisiana House of Representatives from 1960 to 1964. He lost his seat in the House, in 1963, when he ran as a Democratic candidate for Louisiana insurance commissioner. He received 10,773 votes, but lost to candidate Dudley A. Guglielmo, who won with 18,508 votes.

== Death ==
Dyer died on August 10, 2003, in Foley, Alabama, at the age of 79.
