= Eugene McGehee =

American judge and politician (1929-2014)

Member of the Louisiana House of Representatives
- In office 1960–1972

District Judge of the Louisiana Judicial District Court
- In office 1972–1978

Personal details
- Born: Eugene Webb McGehee; March 19, 1929 Baton Rouge, Louisiana, U.S.
- Died: April 11, 2014 (aged 85) Baton Rouge, Louisiana, U.S.
- Party: Democratic
- Spouse: Merrelle Gri McGehee
- Children: 4
- Education: Louisiana State University
- Occupation: Judge

Eugene Webb McGehee (March 19, 1929 – April 11, 2014) was an American judge and politician. A member of the Democratic Party, he served in the Louisiana House of Representatives from 1960 to 1972 and as district judge of the Louisiana Judicial District Court from 1972 to 1978.

== Life and career ==
McGehee was born in Baton Rouge, Louisiana, the son of Edeh and Zola McGehee. He attended and graduated from Louisiana State University, and served in the Louisiana National Guard for more than thirty years, retiring at the rank of colonel.

McGehee served in the Louisiana House of Representatives from 1960 to 1972. After his service in the House, he served as district judge of the Louisiana Judicial District Court from 1972 to 1978.

== Death ==
McGehee died on April 11, 2014, at his home in Baton Rouge, Louisiana, at the age of 85.
