= Mère Poulard =

Mère Poulard may refer to:

- Anne Boutiaut Poulard, known as Mère Poulard (Mother Poulard), creator of l'omelette de la Mère Poulard
- La Mère Poulard, the restaurant in Mont-Saint-Michel, France, owned by Poulard and her husband
