= Poulard =

Poulard is a surname. Notable people with the name include:

- Anne Boutiaut Poulard (1851–1931), known as Mère Poulard, cook and innkeeper in Mont-Saint-Michel, France
- Guire Poulard (1942–2018), Haitian Catholic prelate, Archbishop of Port-au-Prince from 2011 to 2017
- Yann Poulard (born 1969), Swiss former footballer
- Yoann Poulard (born 1976), former French footballer

== See also ==
- Mère Poulard (disambiguation)
- La Mère Poulard, restaurant and hotel on Mont Saint-Michel
- Poulard wheat
- Poularde
