= Mont-Saint-Michel =

Tidal island in Normandy, France

Mont-Saint-Michel Mont Saint Miché (Norman)
- Commune
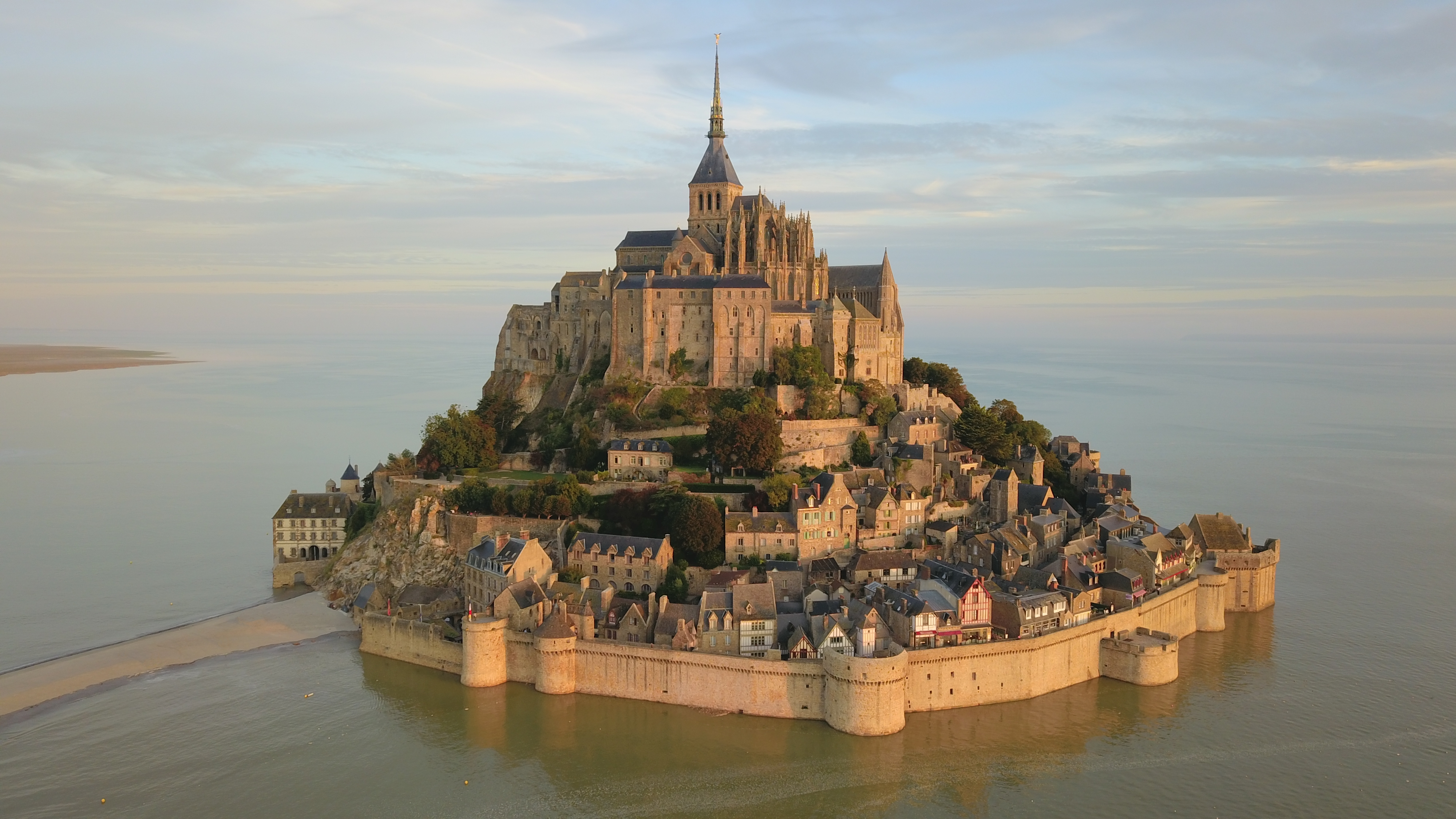
- September 2018 view from the southeast at sunrise

- Coat of arms
- Location of Mont-Saint-Michel
- Location within France Location within Normandy
- Coordinates: 48°38′10″N 1°30′40″W
- Country: France
- Region: Normandy
- Department: Manche
- Arrondissement: Avranches
- Canton: Pontorson
- Intercommunality: Communauté d'agglomération Mont-Saint-Michel-Normandie

Government
  - Mayor (2020–2026): Jacques Bono
- Area^{1}: 4.00 km^{2} (1.54 sq mi)
- Highest elevation: 80 m (260 ft)
- Lowest elevation: 5 m (16 ft)
- Population (2023): 23
  - Density: 5.8/km^{2} (15/sq mi)
- Time zone: UTC+01:00 (CET)
  - Summer (DST): UTC+02:00 (CEST)
- INSEE/Postal code: 50353 /50116

UNESCO World Heritage Site
- Part of: Mont-Saint-Michel and its Bay
- Criteria: Cultural: i, iii, vi
- Reference: 80
- Inscription: 1979 (3rd Session)
- Area: 6,560 hectares (16,200 acres)
- Buffer zone: 57,510 hectares (142,100 acres)
- ^{1} French Land Register data, which excludes lakes, ponds, glaciers > 1 km^{2} (0.386 sq mi or 247 acres) and river estuaries.

Mont-Saint-Michel (French pronunciation: [lə mɔ̃ sɛ̃ miʃɛl]; Norman: Mont Saint Miché; English: Saint Michael's Mount) is a tidal island and mainland commune in Normandy, France.

The island lies approximately one kilometre (half a nautical mile) off France's north-western coast, at the mouth of the Couesnon River near Avranches and is 7 hectares (17 acres) in area. The mainland part of the commune is 393 hectares (971 acres) in area so that the total surface of the commune is 400 hectares (990 acres). As of 2023, the island has a population of 23.

The commune's position—on an island just a few hundred metres from land—made it accessible at low tide to the many pilgrims to its abbey, and defensible as the incoming tide stranded, drove off, or drowned threats on foot. The island remained unconquered during the Hundred Years' War. A small garrison fended off a full attack by the English in 1433. Louis XI recognised the benefits of its natural defence and turned it into a prison. The abbey was used regularly as a prison during the Ancien Régime.

Mont-Saint-Michel and its surrounding bay were inscribed on the UNESCO list of World Heritage Sites in 1979 for its unique aesthetic and importance as a Catholic site. It is visited by more than three million people each year, and is the most-visited tourist attraction in France outside of Paris. Over 60 buildings within the commune are protected as historical monuments.

== Geography ==
=== Formation ===
Now a rocky tidal island, the mount occupied dry land in prehistoric times. As sea levels rose, erosion reshaped the coastal landscape, and several outcrops of granite emerged in the bay, having resisted the wear and tear of the ocean better than the surrounding rocks. These included Lillemer, Mont Dol, Tombelaine (the island just to the north), and Mont Tombe, later called Mont-Saint-Michel.

Mont-Saint-Michel consists of leucogranite which solidified from an underground intrusion of molten magma about 525 million years ago, during the Cambrian period, as one of the younger parts of the Mancellian granitic batholith. Early studies of Mont-Saint-Michel by French geologists sometimes describe the leucogranite of the Mont as "granulite", but this granitic meaning of granulite is now obsolete.

The mount has a circumference of about 960 m (3,150 ft) and its highest point is 92 m (302 ft) above sea level.

=== Tides ===
The tides vary greatly, at roughly 14 metres (46 ft) between highest and lowest water marks. Popularly nicknamed "St. Michael in peril of the sea" by medieval pilgrims making their way across the flats, the mount can still pose dangers for visitors who avoid the bridge and attempt the hazardous walk across the sands from the neighbouring coast.

Polderisation and occasional flooding have created salt marsh meadows that were found to be ideally suited to grazing sheep. Agneau de pré-salé ('salt-meadow / salt-marsh lamb') is a local specialty that may be found on the menus of restaurants that depend on income from the many visitors to the mount.

=== Tidal island ===
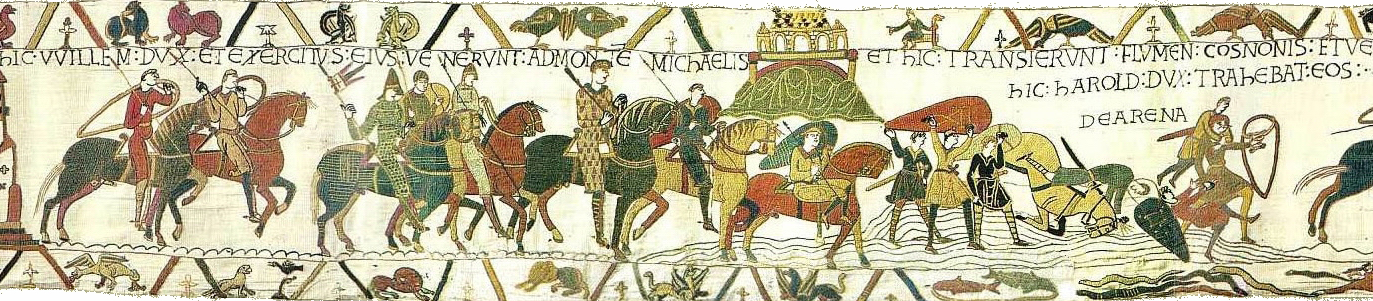
Bayeux Tapestry scenes 16 and 17: William and Harold at Mont-Saint-Michel (at top centre), Harold rescuing knights from quicksand.

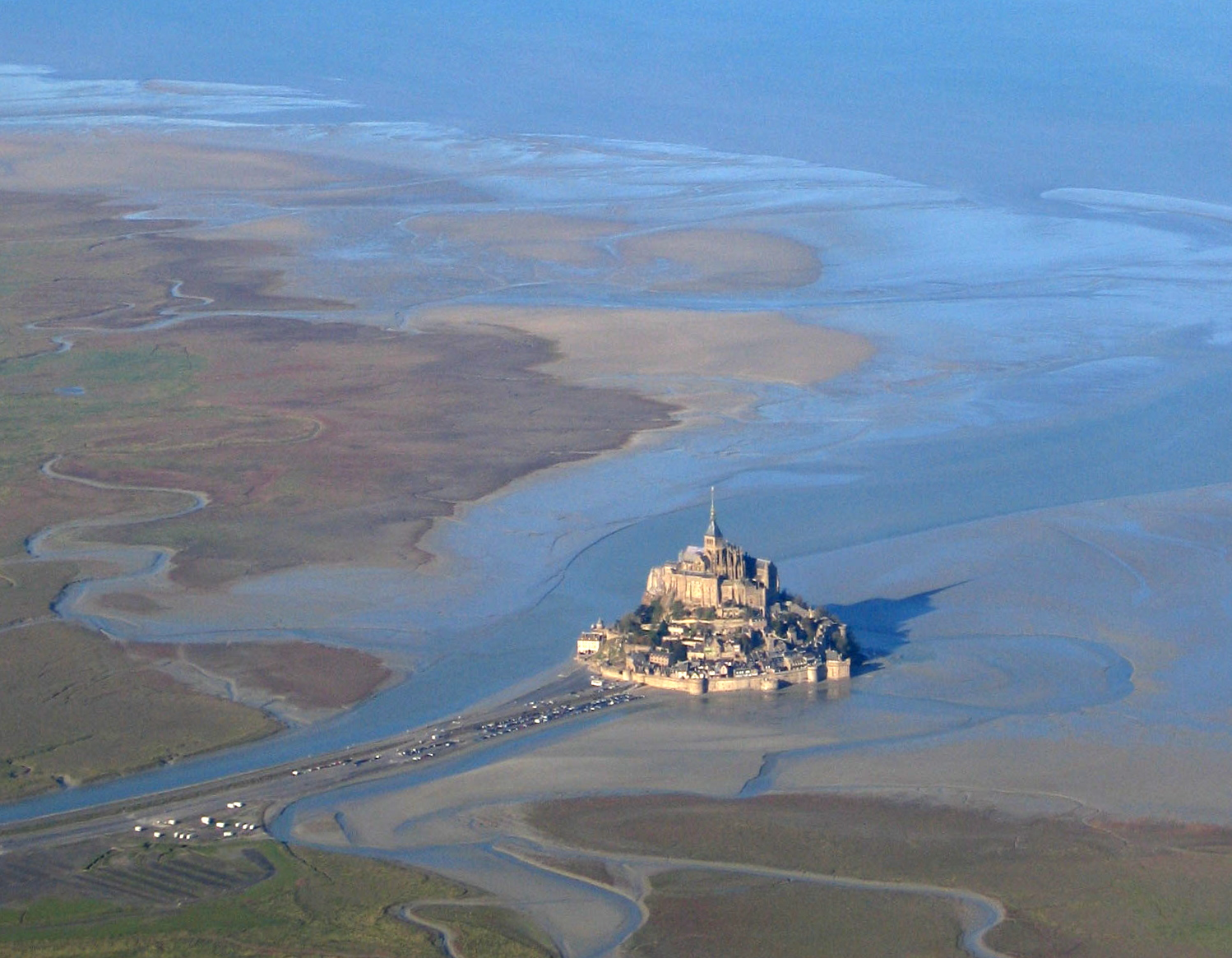
Mont-Saint-Michel at low tide in November 2005

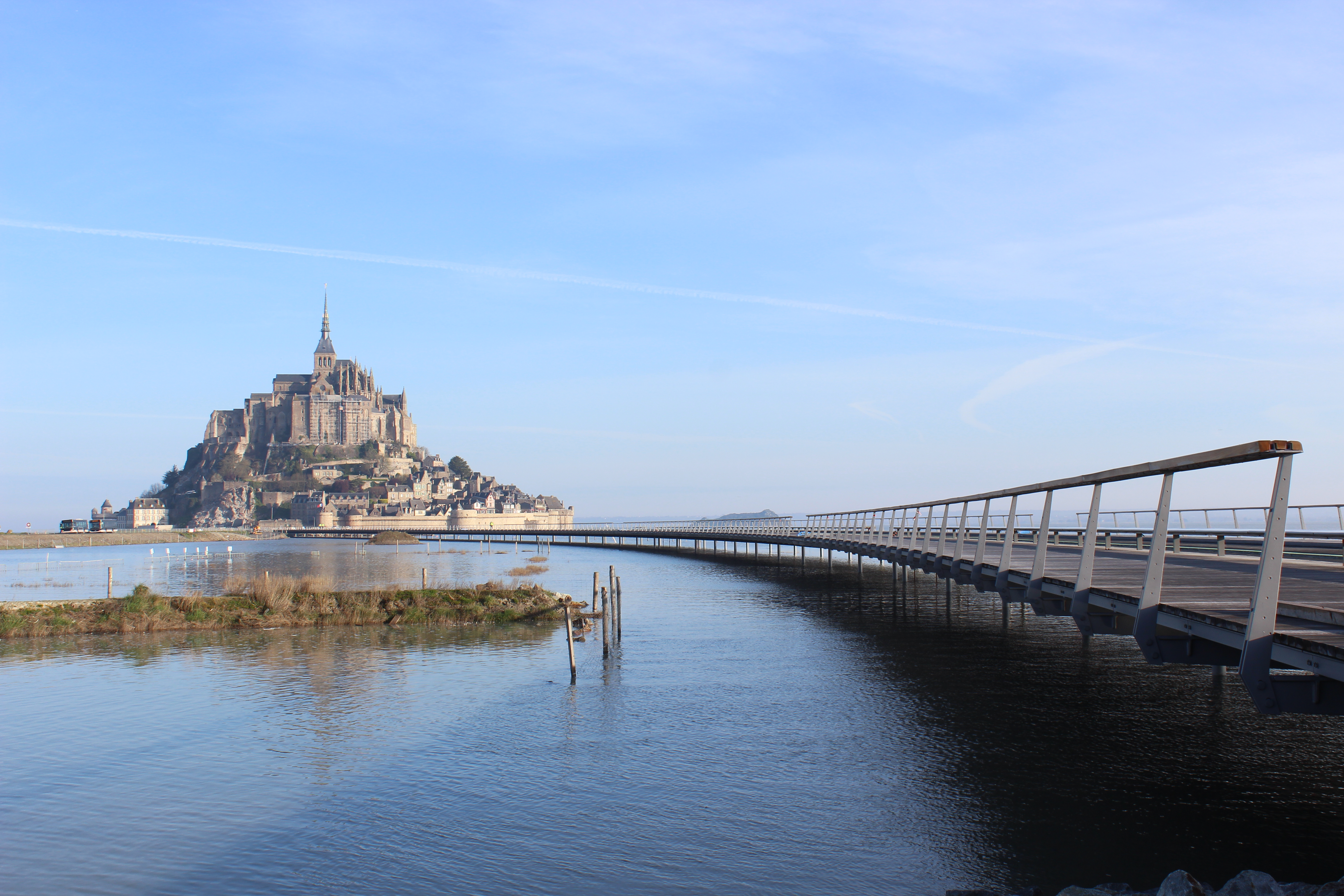
The Mont-Saint-Michel in 2014 with the new bridge

The connection between Mont-Saint-Michel and the mainland has changed over the centuries. Previously connected by tidal causeway uncovered only at low tide, this was converted into a raised causeway in 1879, preventing the tide from scouring the silt around the mount. The coastal flats have been polderised to create pastureland, decreasing the distance between the shore and the island, and the Couesnon river has been canalised, reducing the dispersion of the flow of water. These factors have all encouraged silting-up of the bay.

In June 2006, French prime minister Dominique de Villepin and regional authorities announced a €200 million project (Projet Mont-Saint-Michel) to build a hydraulic dam using the waters of the Couesnon and the tides to help remove the accumulated silt, and to make Mont-Saint-Michel an island again. The construction of the dam began in 2009. The project included the removal of the causeway and its visitor car park. Since April 2012, the new car park on the mainland has been located 2.5 kilometres (1 1/2 mi) from the island. Visitors can walk or use shuttles to cross the bridge.

In July 2014, the new bridge, by architect Dietmar Feichtinger, was opened to the public. The light bridge allows waters to flow freely around the island and improves the efficiency of the now-operational dam. The bridge, which cost €209 million, was opened by President François Hollande.

On rare occasions, tidal circumstances produce an extremely high "supertide". The new bridge was completely submerged on 21 March 2015 by the highest sea level, a once-in-18-years occurrence, as crowds gathered to snap photos.

== History ==
=== 8th century onward ===
Before the construction of the first monastic establishment in the 8th century, the island was called Mont Tombe (Latin: tumba). According to a legend, the archangel Michael appeared in 708 to Aubert of Avranches, the bishop of Avranches, and instructed him to build a church on the rocky islet.

Unable to defend his kingdom against the assaults of the Vikings, the king of the Franks agreed to grant the Cotentin Peninsula and the Avranchin, including Mont-Saint-Michel traditionally linked to the city of Avranches, to the Bretons in the Treaty of Compiègne. This marked the beginning of a brief period of Breton possession of the Mont. In fact, these lands and Mont-Saint-Michel were never really included in the duchy of Brittany. Around 989–990 these traditional bishoprics, dependent of the archbishopric of Rouen and that had been left vacant during the time of the Viking raids, regained their bishops.

The mount gained strategic significance again in 933 when William I Longsword annexed the Cotentin Peninsula from the weakened Duchy of Brittany. This made the mount definitively part of Normandy, and is depicted in the Bayeux Tapestry, which commemorates the Norman Conquest. Harold Godwinson is pictured on the tapestry rescuing two Norman knights from the quicksand in the tidal flats during the Breton–Norman war. Norman ducal patronage financed the spectacular Norman architecture of the abbey in subsequent centuries.

In 1067, the monastery of Mont-Saint-Michel gave its support to William the Conqueror in his claim to the English throne. This he rewarded with properties and grounds on the English side of the Channel, including a small island off the southwestern coast of Cornwall which was modelled after Mont-Saint-Michel and became a Norman priory named St Michael's Mount of Penzance.

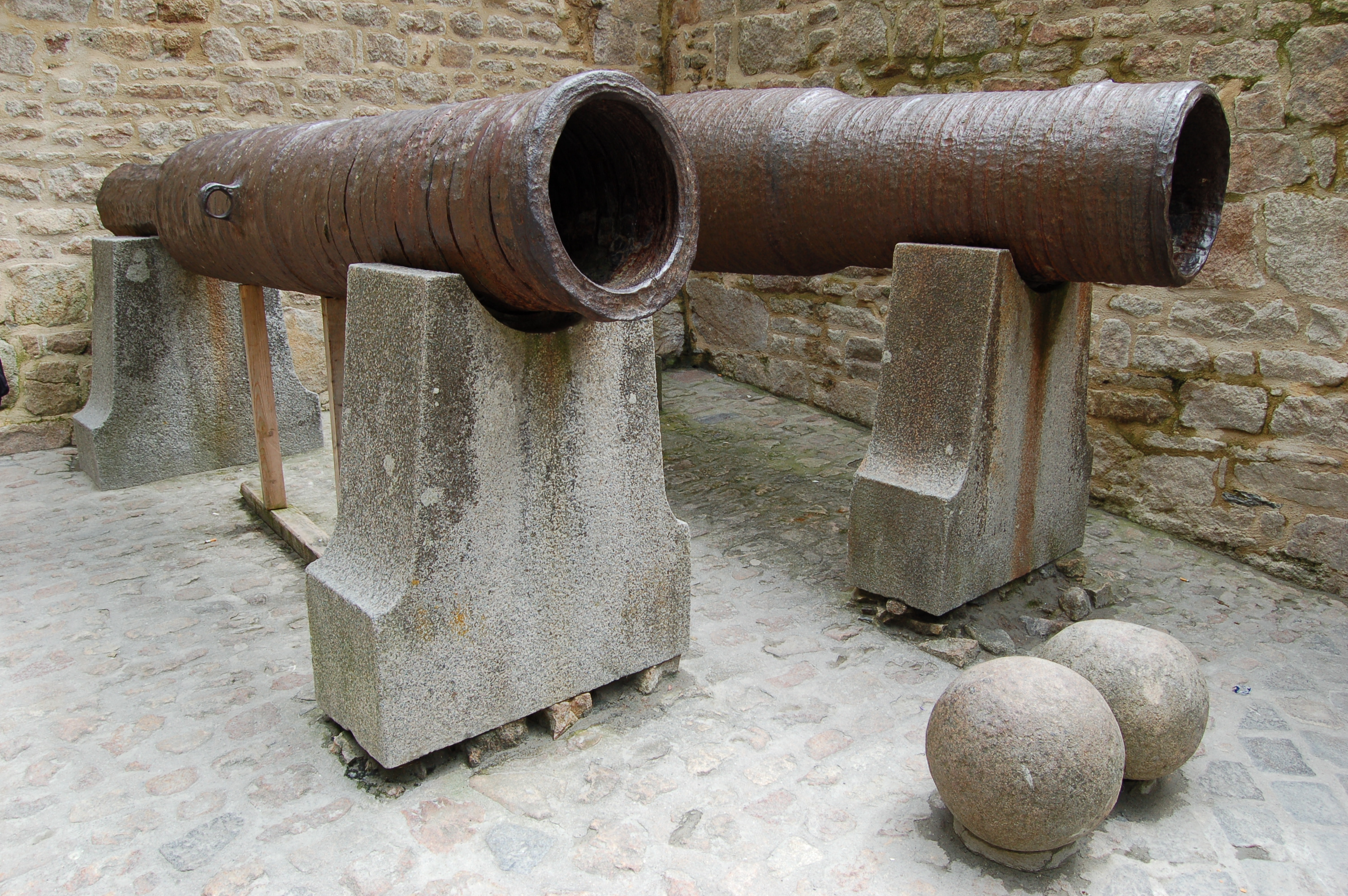
Two bombards abandoned by English forces and currently on display.

=== 14th century ===
Under the rule of the 29th abbot, Pierre le Roy, from 1386 to 1410, new fortifications were built: at the northeast corner of the Merveille, an octagonal crowning element was added to the Corbins tower; at its base, a long curtain wall-terrace overlooking the woods. In 1393, two turrets were added to flank the 1257 gate. Large steps were built in front of the barbican, and the abbot had a fortified residence built, as well as the square-based Pénine tower, designed to guard the Grand Degré.

During the Hundred Years' War, English forces unsuccessfully besieged Mont-Saint-Michel (which was under French control) twice. The first siege started in 1423, and was lifted the next year. In 1433, an English force equipped with wrought-iron bombards and under the command of Thomas Scales, 7th Baron Scales again besieged the island. It was likewise lifted the next year. Scales's men abandoned two bombards they had used during the siege on 17 June 1434; they were recovered by the French and are currently on display.

When Louis XI of France founded the Order of Saint Michael in 1469, he intended that the abbey church of Mont-Saint-Michel become the chapel for the order, but because of its great distance from Paris, his intention could never be realized.

=== Recent times ===
The wealth and influence of the abbey extended to many daughter foundations, including St Michael's Mount in Cornwall. Its popularity and prestige as a centre of pilgrimage waned with the Reformation, and by the time of the French Revolution there were scarcely any monks in residence. The abbey was closed and converted into a prison, initially to hold clerical opponents of the republican regime. High-profile political prisoners followed. By 1836, influential figures—including Victor Hugo—had launched a campaign to restore what was seen as a national architectural treasure. The prison was closed in 1863.

In 1872, French architect of historic monuments Édouard Corroyer was responsible for assessing the condition of Mont-Saint-Michel. It took him about two years to convince his minister to classify it as a historic monument, and it was officially declared as such in 1874. From then on Corroyer, a member of the Academy of Fine Arts, devoted fifteen years of his life to the restoration of "la Merveille". Under his direction, gigantic works were undertaken, starting with the most urgent. He wrote four works on the building.

During the occupation of France in World War II, German soldiers occupied Mont-Saint-Michel, where they used St. Aubert church as a lookout post. The island was a major attraction for German tourists and soldiers, with around 325,000 German tourists from July 18, 1940, to the end of the occupation of France.

After the Allies' initial D-Day invasion of Normandy that began on June 6, 1944, many exhausted German soldiers retreated to strongholds like Mont-Saint-Michel. On August 1, 1944, a single American soldier – Private Freeman Brougher, from Pennsylvania, of the 72nd Publicity Service Battalion (a small Anglo-American psychological warfare unit) – reached and liberated Mont-Saint-Michel accompanied by two British reporters, Gault MacGowan of the New York Sun and Paul Holt with the London Daily Express. Jubilant crowds of locals greeted Brougher, Holt and MacGowan, and Brougher signed the Golden Book, the island's record of visiting nobility, at the mayor's invitation. The abbey was also used as a prison for the first time since the French Revolution when male collaborators with the Germans were jailed there.

Mont-Saint-Michel and its bay were added to the UNESCO list of World Heritage Sites in 1979, listed with criteria such as cultural, historical, and architectural significance, as well as human-created and natural beauty.

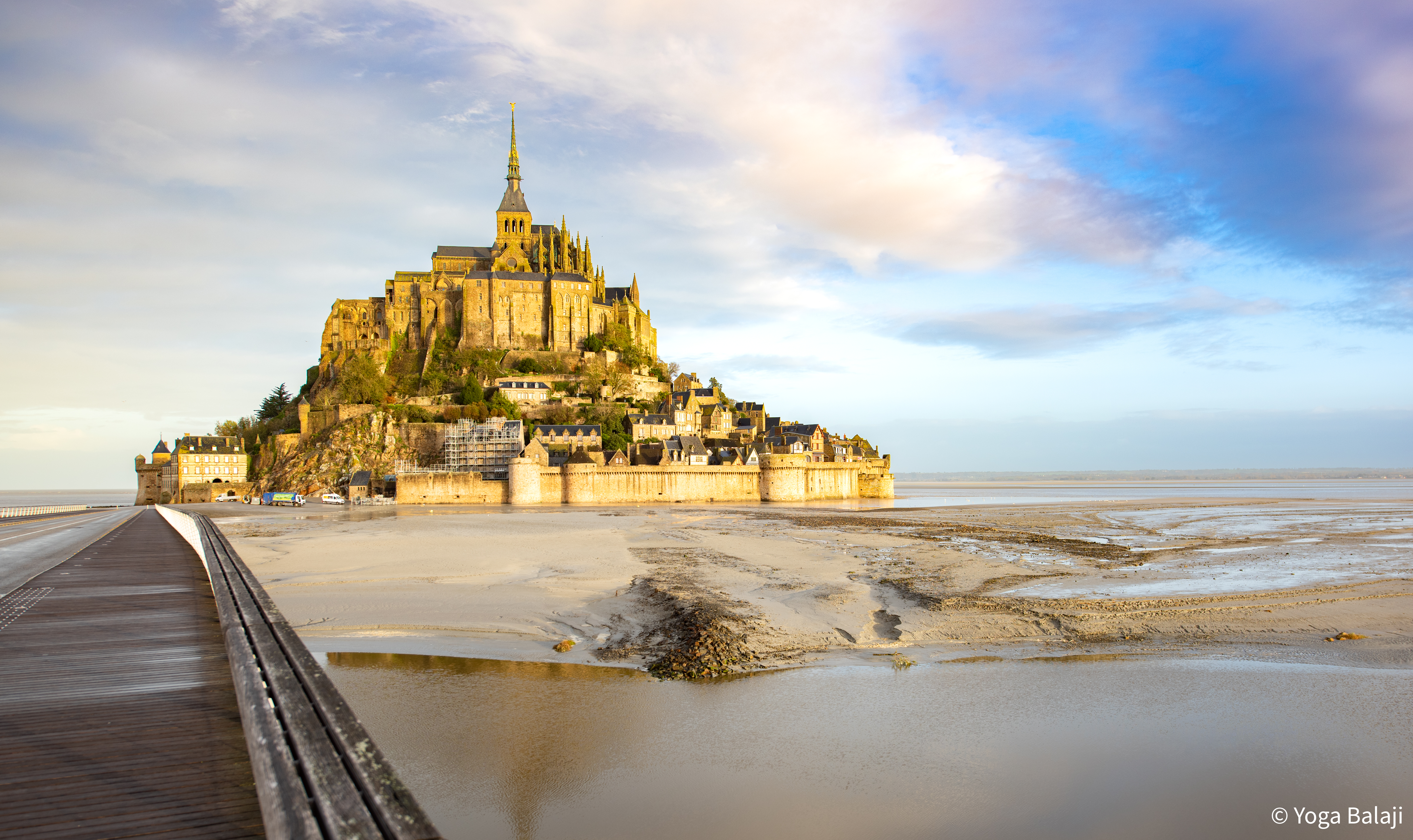
Mont Saint Michel in 2023

In June 2023, President Emmanuel Macron visited Mont-Saint-Michel to mark the abbey's millennium. He stated that the changes since the hydraulic dam and the new bridge opened have lessened the silting, making it an island again.

=== Abbey design ===
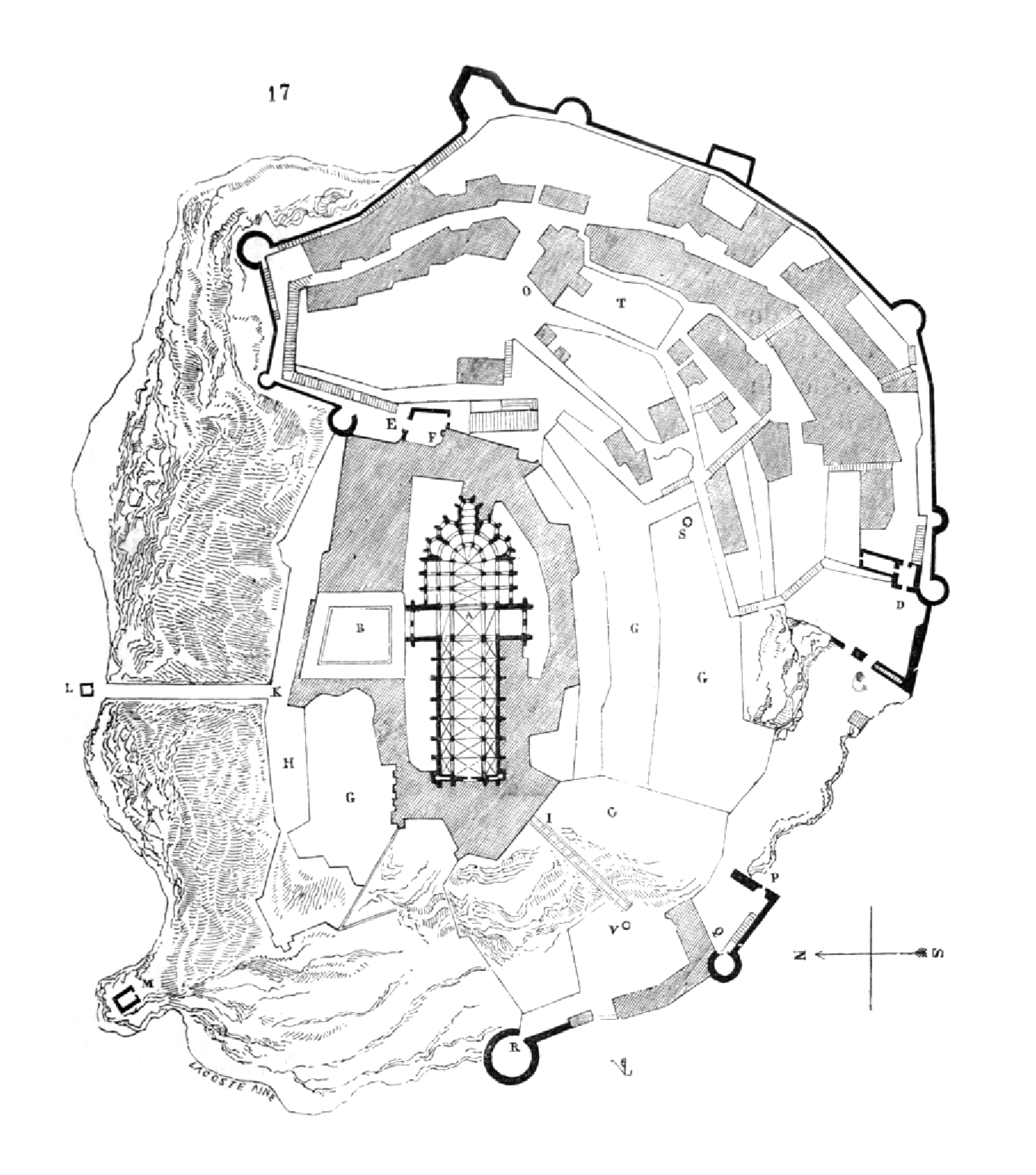
A plan of the mount by Eugène Viollet-le-Duc

In the 11th century, William of Volpiano, the Italian architect who had built Fécamp Abbey in Normandy, was chosen by Richard II, Duke of Normandy, to be the building contractor. He designed the Romanesque church of the abbey, daringly placing the transept crossing at the top of the mount. Many underground crypts and chapels had to be built to compensate for this weight. These formed the basis for the supportive upward structure that can be seen today. Today Mont-Saint-Michel is seen as a building of Romanesque architecture.

Robert de Thorigny, a great supporter of Henry II of England, who was also Duke of Normandy, reinforced the structure of the buildings and built the main façade of the church in the 12th century. In 1204, Guy of Thouars, regent for the Duchess of Brittany, as vassal of the King of France, undertook a siege of the Mount. After setting fire to the village and massacring the population, he beat a retreat under the powerful walls of the abbey. The fire which he lit extended to the buildings, and the roofs fell prey to the flames. Horrified by the cruelty of his Breton ally, Philip Augustus offered Abbot Jordan a grant for the reconstruction of the abbey in the new Gothic architectural style.

Charles VI is credited with adding major fortifications to the abbey-mount, building towers, successive courtyards, and strengthening the ramparts.

=== Development ===
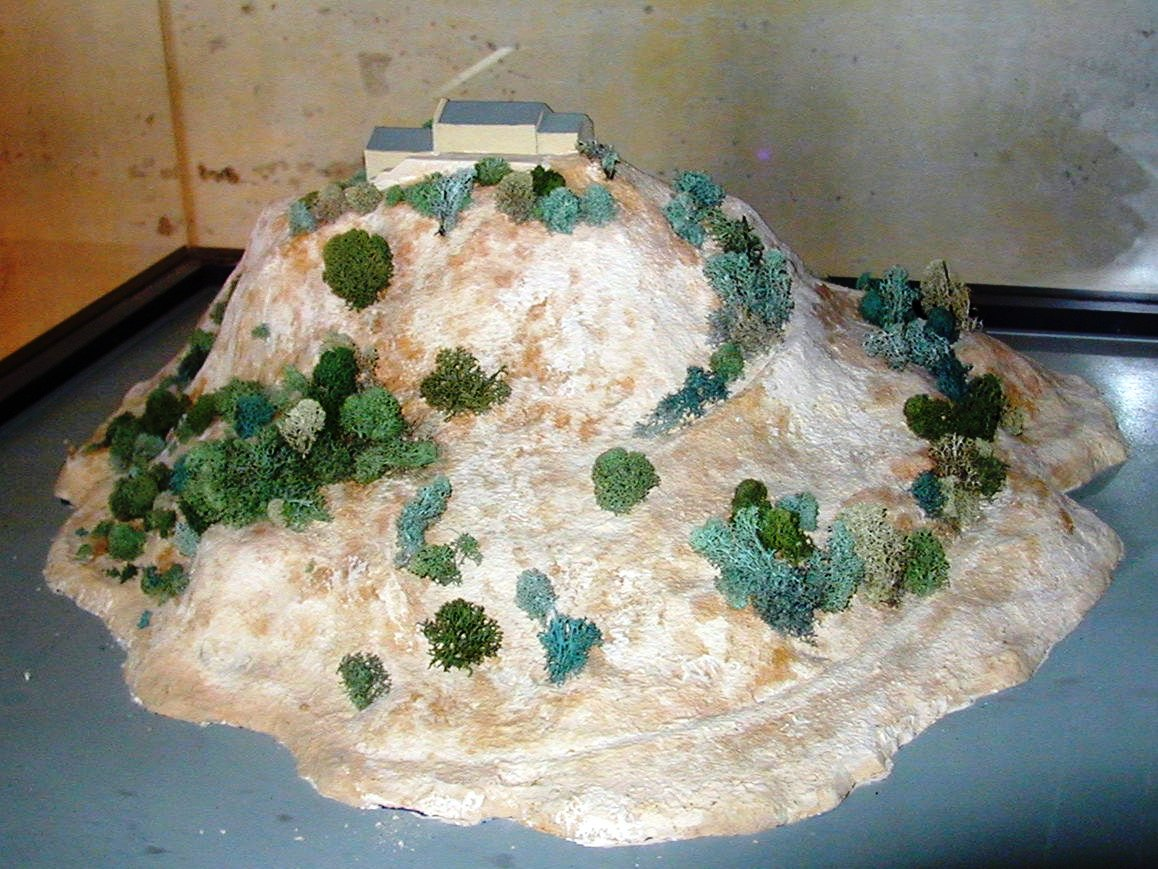
10th century

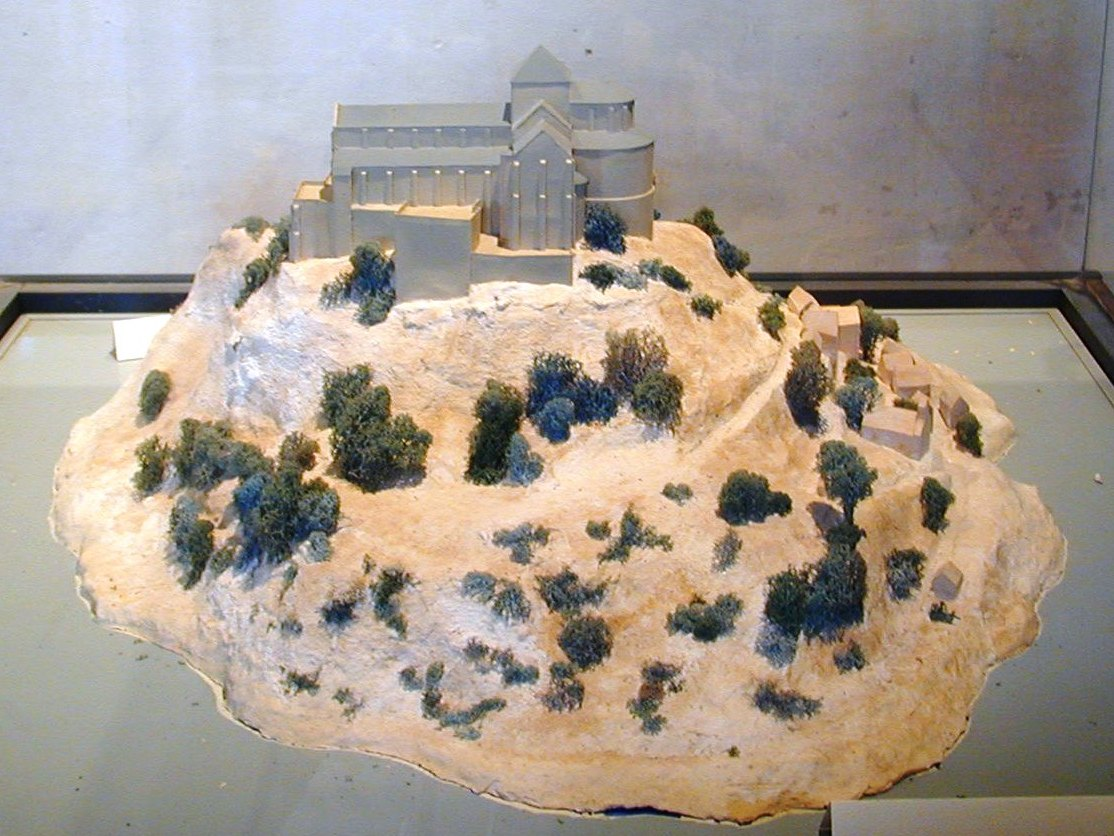
11th to 12th century

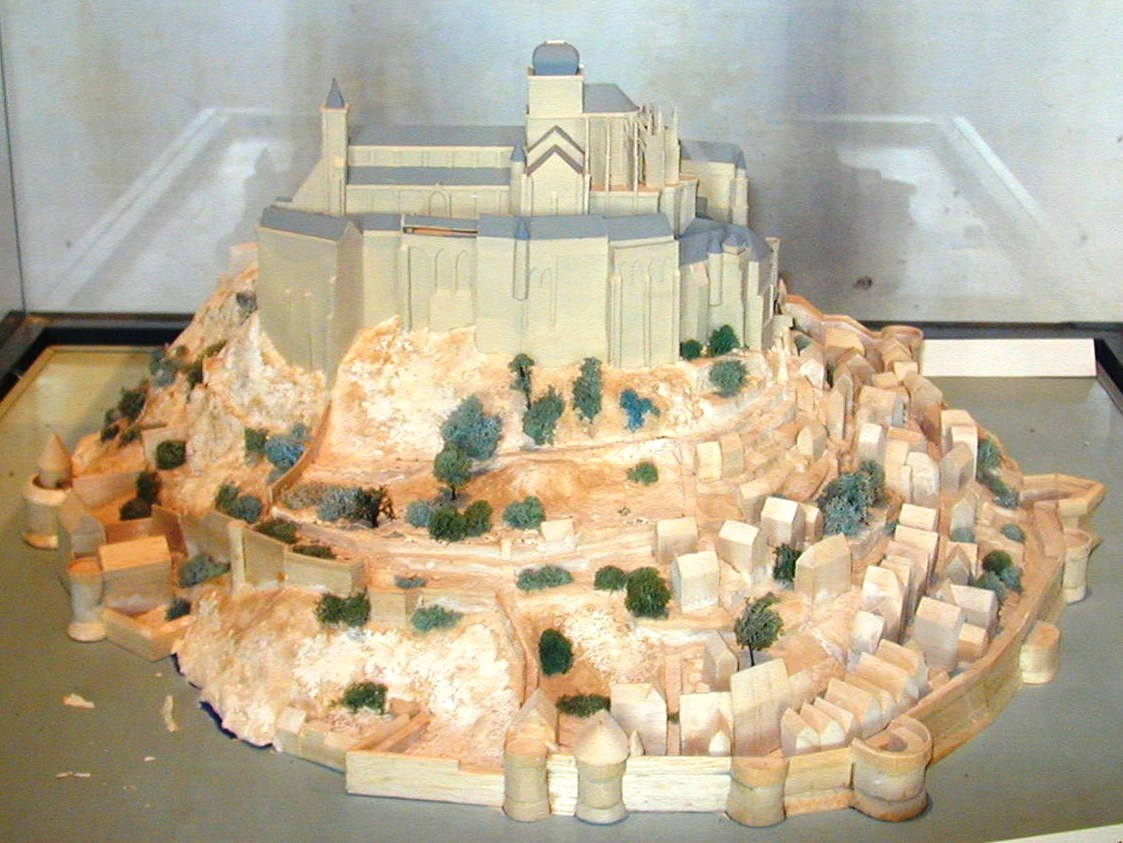
17th to 18th century

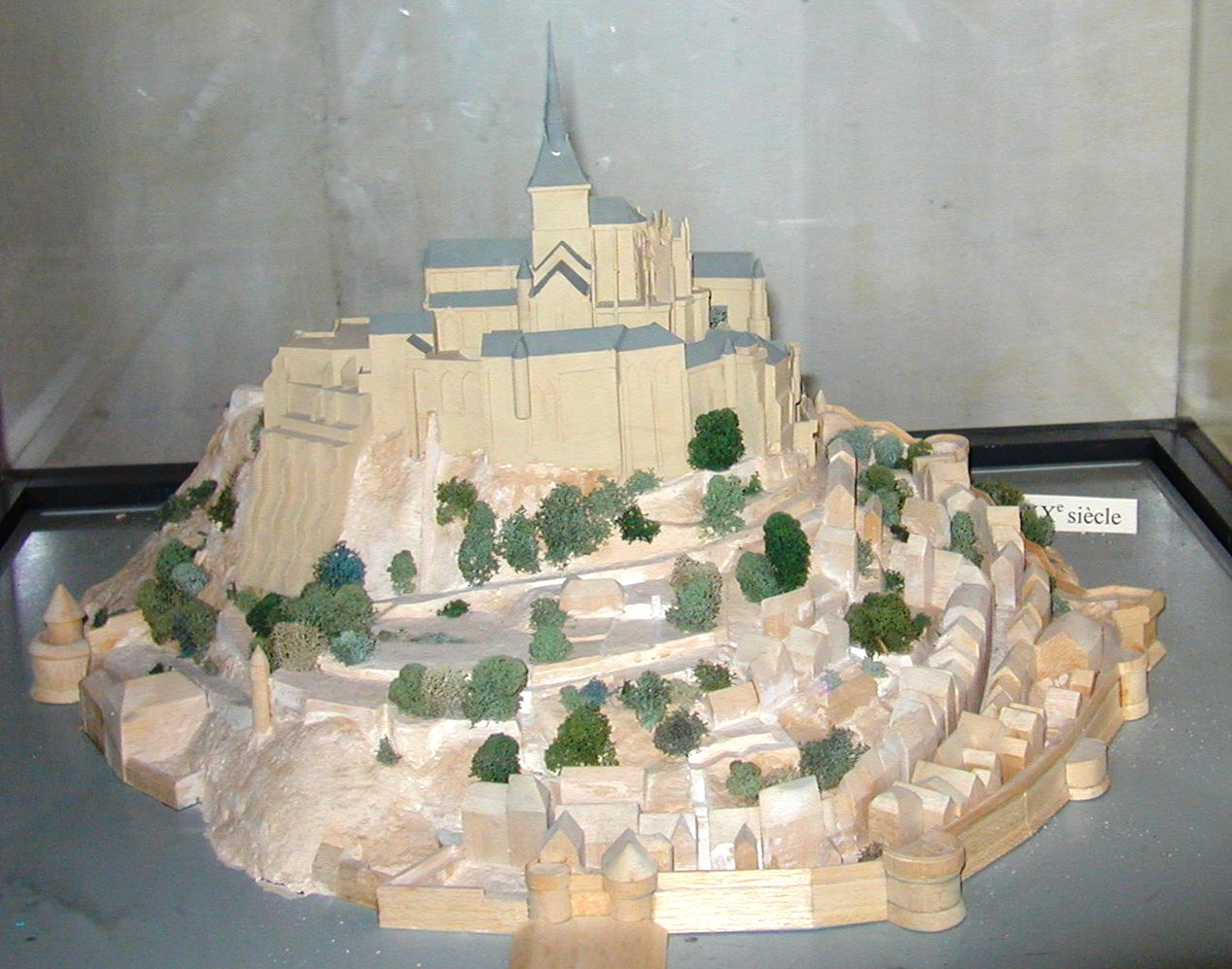
19th to 21st century

== Administration ==
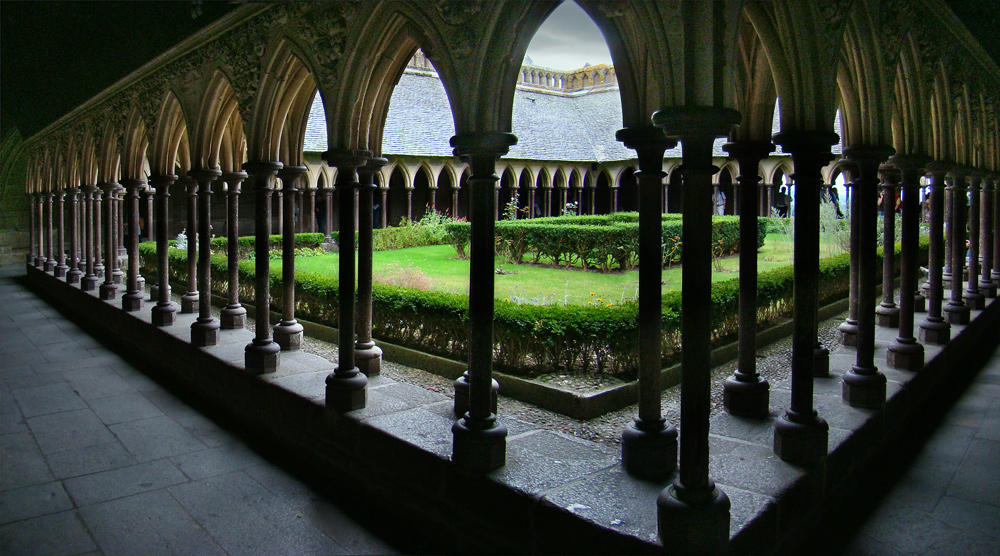
The cloister

The islet belongs to the French commune of Le Mont-Saint-Michel, in the département of Manche, in Normandy. The nearest significant town, with an SNCF train station, is Pontorson, with a population of slightly over 4,000. Mont-Saint-Michel belongs to the Organization of World Heritage Cities.

== Population ==
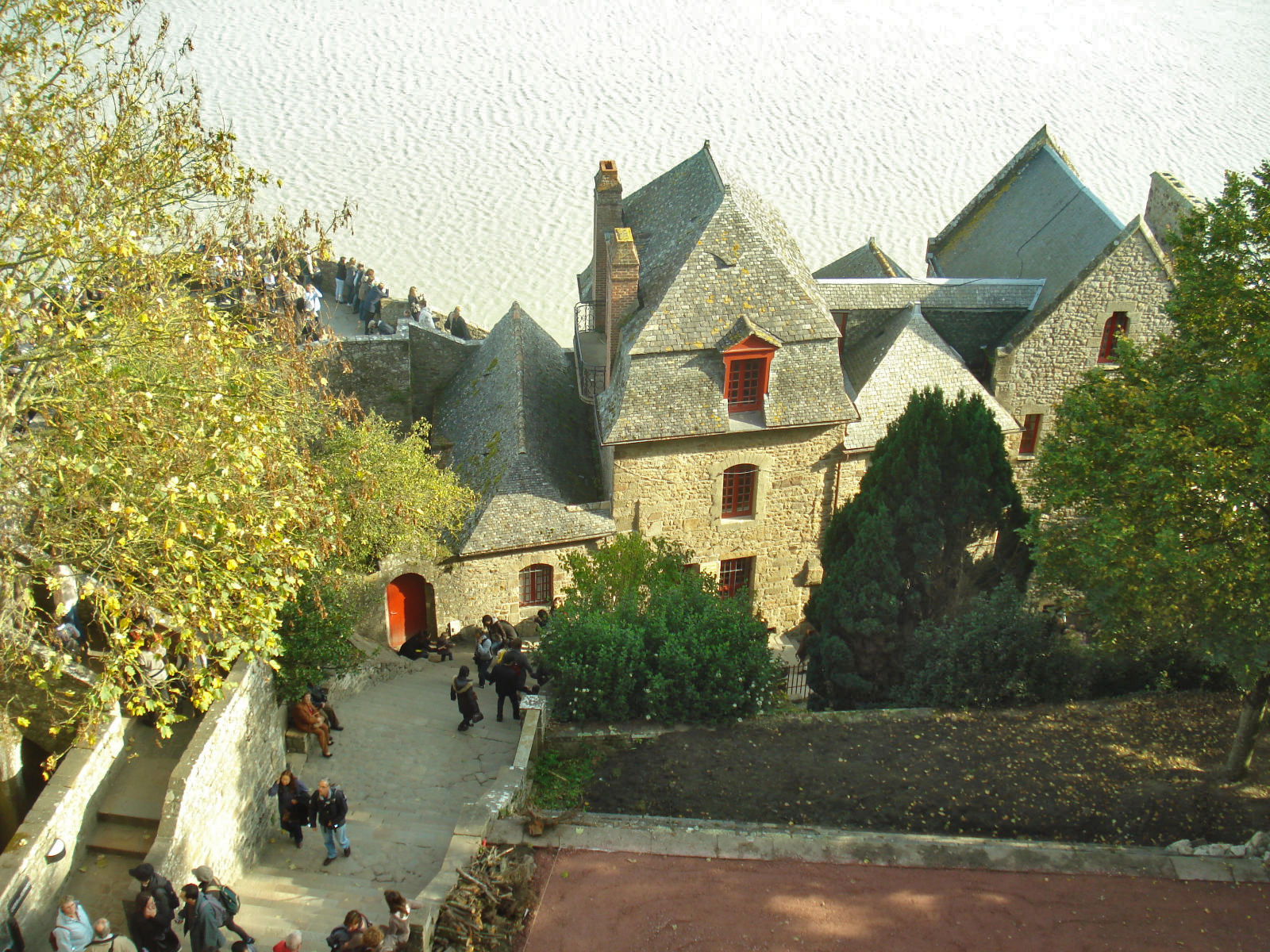
Inside the walls of Mont-Saint-Michel

Historical population of Le Mont-Saint-Michel

Year	Pop.	±% p.a.
1793	234	—
1800	234	+0.00%
1806	282	+3.16%
1821	304	+0.50%
1831	390	+2.52%
1836	385	−0.26%
1841	1,082	+22.96%
1846	1,100	+0.33%
1851	1,182	+1.45%
1856	1,153	−0.50%
1861	1,056	−1.74%
1866	203	−28.09%
1872	193	−0.84%

Year	Pop.	±% p.a.
1876	184	−1.19%
1881	209	+2.58%
1886	211	+0.19%
1891	199	−1.16%
1896	230	+2.94%
1901	235	+0.43%
1906	238	+0.25%
1911	232	−0.51%
1921	230	−0.09%
1926	247	+1.44%
1931	250	+0.24%
1936	231	−1.57%
1946	186	−2.14%

Year	Pop.	±% p.a.
1954	268	+4.67%
1962	132	−8.47%
1968	105	−3.74%
1975	114	+1.18%
1982	80	−4.93%
1990	72	−1.31%
1999	46	−4.86%
2007	41	−1.43%
2012	41	+0.00%
2017	30	−6.06%
2023	23	−4.33%

From the year 1962 on: No double counting—residents of multiple communes (e.g., students and military personnel) are counted only once.
Source: EHESS and Insee

	1956–1962	1962–1968	1968–1975	1975–1982	1982–1990	1990–1999
Births	xx	13	16	8	6	4
Deaths	xx	6	6	4	5	3

== The Monastic Fraternities of Jerusalem ==
Since June 2001, following the appeal addressed to them in 2000 by Jacques Fihey, Bishop of Coutances and Avranches, a community of monks and nuns of the Monastic Fraternities of Jerusalem, sent from the mother-house of St-Gervais-et-St-Protais in Paris, have been living as a community on Mont-Saint-Michel. They replaced the Benedictine monks who returned to the mount in 1966. They are tenants of the centre for national monuments and are not involved in the management of the abbey.

The community has seven sisters and four brothers. Their life revolves around prayer, work and fraternal life. The community meets four times a day to recite the liturgical office in the abbey, or in the crypt of Notre-Dame des Trente Cierges in winter. In 2012, the community undertook the renovation of a house on the mount, the Logis Saint-Abraham, which is used as a guest house for pilgrims on retreat.

== Dolphins in the bay ==
In summer, dolphins from the warmer waters of the Atlantic Ocean follow ocean currents into the bay, where they are often seen near local fishermen's traditional boats, known as barquettes. These small boats are about 5 metres long and 2 metres wide, typically fitted with low-powered motors, and the current created by their propellers appears to attract the dolphins. Sightings of dolphins playing near the boats are common during this period.

== People and places of note ==
- Robert of Torigni, famous abbot of the mount;
- The Duke of Chartres (later Louis-Philippe I) came to demolish the "iron cage";
- Louis Auguste Blanqui, political prisoner in the mount;
- Armand Barbès, political prisoner in the mount;
- La Mère Poulard, famous restaurant;
- Anne Boutiaut Poulard, creator of the Omelette de la mère Poulard.
- Tiphaine Raguenel, Breton noblewoman and astrologer.

== Economy ==
The Mont-Saint-Michel has long been dominated by a handful of families which shared the businesses in the town and ran the village administration. Tourism is almost the sole source of income of the commune, bringing US$63 million to the small island in 2014. There are about 50 shops for three million tourists. The island is also home to four museums, showcasing the history, culture, and heritage of Mont-Saint-Michel. About 25 people sleep every night on the mount, monks included, except for those in hotels. There are 132 hotel rooms within the island's walls. The main institutions are shared by:

- Eric Vannier, owner of the group Mère Poulard (holding half of restaurants, shops, hotels and three museums);
- Jean-Yves Vételé, CEO of Sodetour (five hotels, a supermarket and shops—all extramural—including Mercury Barracks);
- Patrick Gaul, former elected official, hotelier and intramural restaurateur;
- Independent merchants.

Overtourism is a problem for Mont-Saint-Michel, exacerbated by tourists mostly visiting on day-trips, which causes overcrowding from 10:00 to 16:00, especially in the summer. The Mont-Saint-Michel foundation has introduced measures to change this pattern and reduce daytime overcrowding, including by introducing free parking after 18:30, except during July and August.

The nearest airports to Mont-Saint-Michel are Rennes–Saint-Jacques Airport, located 88 km (55 mi) south and Nantes Atlantique Airport, located 198 km (123 mi) south.

== Twin towns and sister cities ==
- Hatsukaichi, Hiroshima, Japan, where Itsukushima Shrine, another UNESCO World Heritage Site, is located.

Historically, Mont-Saint-Michel was the Norman counterpart of St Michael's Mount in Cornwall, England, which was given to the Benedictines, the religious order of Mont-Saint-Michel, by Edward the Confessor in the 11th century. The two mounts share the same tidal island characteristics and a similar conical shape, though Mont-Saint-Michel is much taller.

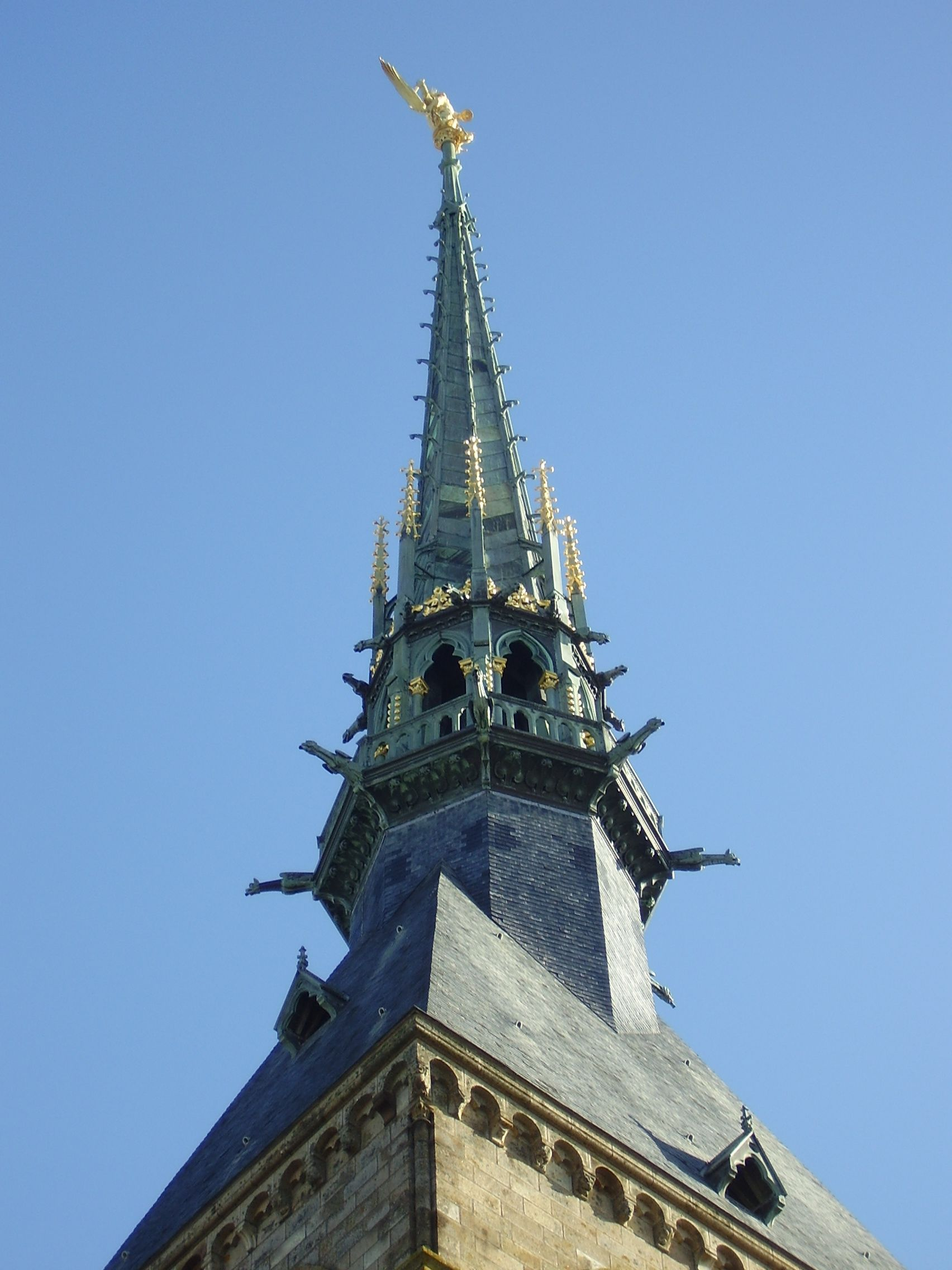
A statue of Archangel Michael atop the spire

== Modern pilgrimage ==
During the medieval period, pilgrims walked from Italy, Germany and England, as well as other parts of France. Such devotees were known as Miquelots. Modern pilgrims can follow the same routes. Ten hiking trails have been created that enable pilgrims from various European countries to retrace the path their ancestors may have taken during a medieval pilgrimage.

== In popular culture ==
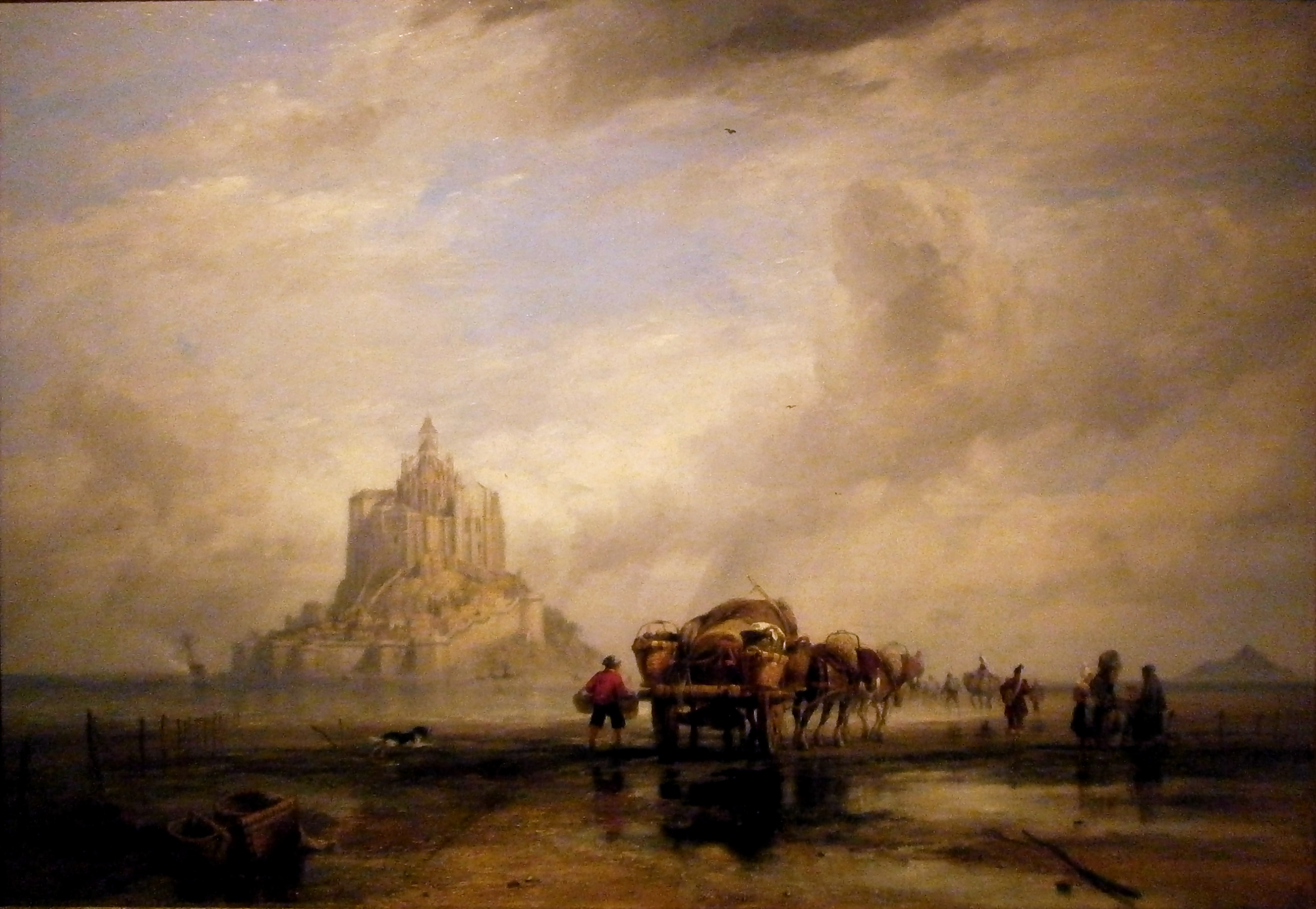
Mont Saint Michel, Normandy by Edward William Cooke, 1838

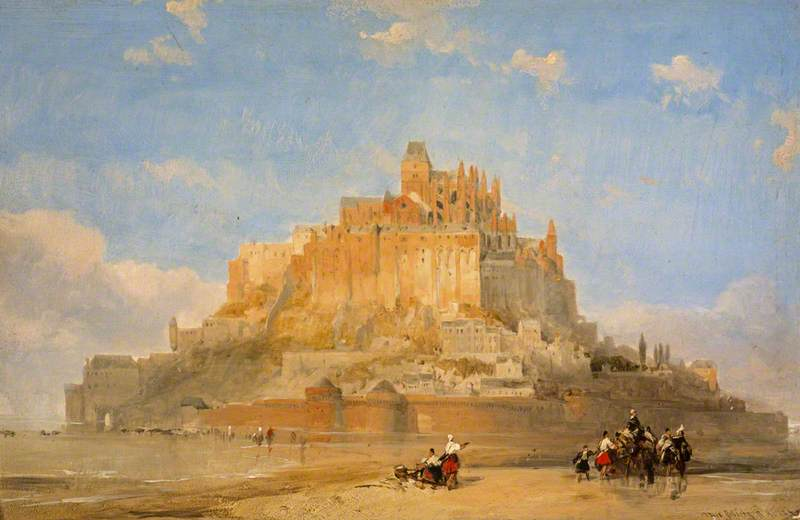
Mont Saint Michel by David Roberts, 1848

=== Cinema ===
Part of the action in Helen MacInnes's 1943 film thriller Assignment in Brittany takes place at the Mont, including a dramatic nighttime chase across the sands. Alan Lee is said to have taken inspiration from Mont-Saint-Michel in designing Gondor's capital city, Minas Tirith, in Peter Jackson's 2003 film The Lord of the Rings: The Return of the King.

The Kingdom of Corona in the 2010 Disney film Tangled is based on Mont-Saint-Michel.

Monte-Saint-Michel was also featured in the final episode of the first season of The Walking Dead: Daryl Dixon as well as the second season.

Mindwalk is a 1990 feature film directed by Bernt Capra, adapted from his short story based on The Turning Point, a nonfiction book by physicist Fritjof Capra, his brother. The movie was filmed on site at the Mont Saint-Michel and has views of (and scenes conceptually based around) many structures and features there, including the approach over the tidal flats, the cathedral, the walkways, a torture chamber, and a giant, ancient clock mechanism.

=== Animation ===
Mont-Saint-Michel makes a brief appearance in the 4th episode of the anime Saint Cecilia and Pastor Lawrence.

=== Video games ===
Mont-Saint-Michel is a World Wonder in Civilization VI.

Mont-Saint-Michel is featured in Onimusha 3: Demon Siege in which the abbey is overrun by demons in both the 16th and 21st centuries and subsequently destroyed.

A fictionalized version of the island, Beaumont-Saint-Denis, serves as the location for Sniper Elite 5's third mission. The castle is also the inspiration for the site of the climactic final battle in the air combat video game The Sky Crawlers: Innocent Aces, in which it is an abandoned enemy fortress with still-operational anti-air turrets. It also inspires the castle that appears on the cover art of the 1997 video game: Castlevania Symphony of the Night and Dark Souls' New Londo Ruins.

Mont-Saint-Michel serves as an area in Country of the Musketeers in Kingdom Hearts: Dream Drop Distance, where Sora and the Three Musketeers composed of Mickey Mouse, Donald Duck and Goofy attempt to rescue Princess Minnie from Pete.

The map "Corrode" introduced in June 2025 in Valorant takes inspiration from Mont-Saint-Michel.

=== Music ===
Mike Oldfield named a song after the island on his 1996 album Voyager.

Aphex Twin, a Cornish electronic composer, has a song named "Mt Saint Michel + Saint Michaels Mount" on the album Drukqs, named after the two similar tidal islands.

American musician Quadeca featured the island in the music video for his song "AT A TIME LIKE THIS". The song was included on his 2025 visual album Vanisher, Horizon Scraper.

It appears in the 1992 music video Queen of Rain by Roxette.

== See also ==
- Aragonese Castle
- Carolingian architecture
- Carolingian art
- French Romanesque architecture
- Key Monastery
- La Mère Poulard
- Le Mont Saint Michel (clothing), clothing brand named after the abbey
- List of Carolingian monasteries
- Manoir de Brion
- Monemvasia
- Mont-Saint-Michel Abbey
- Mont Saint Michel and Chartres (1904) by Henry Adams
- Saint-Malo
- Saint Michael in the Catholic Church
- St Michael's Mount, England
- Saint Michael's line
