= Manoir de Brion =

Benedictine priory in France

Coordinates: 48°41′47″N 1°29′36″W

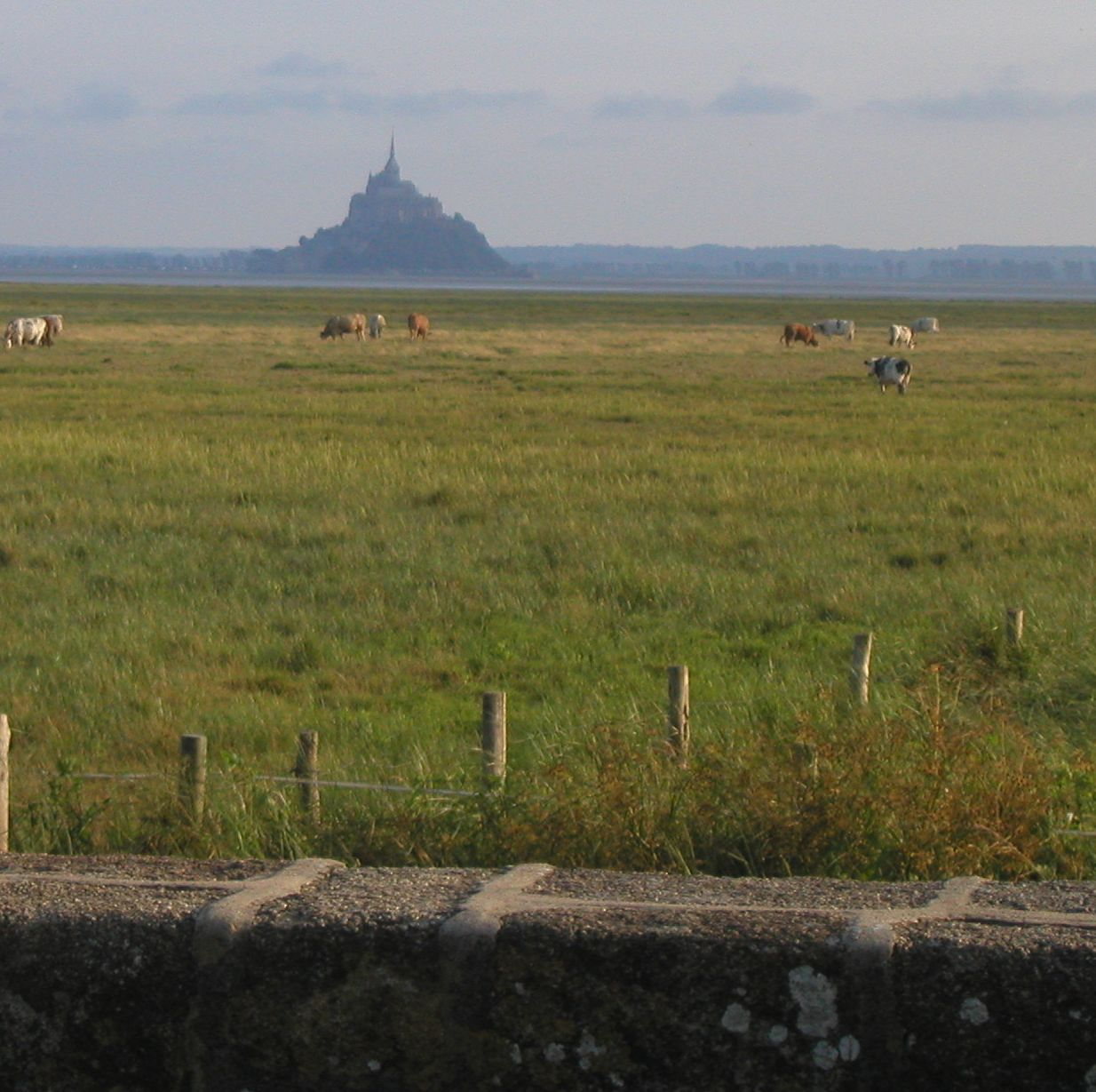
The abbey of Mont Saint-Michel pictured in the distance

The Manoir de Brion (French pronunciation: [ma.nwaʁ də bʁi.jɔ̃]), also known as the Château de Brion, is a former Benedictine priory of the abbey of Mont Saint-Michel, France.

It is located near the village of Genêts, in Normandy, and was founded in 1137 by the abbot Bernard du Bec. Several kings and members of the royal court stayed at the Manoir de Brion while on pilgrimage to Mont Saint-Michel, including Charles VI in 1393, Louis XI in 1462 and Francis I of France in 1532. The explorer Jacques Cartier was also presented to King Francis I at the Manoir de Brion before his 1534 voyage to Canada, where one of the Magdalen Islands would be named Île Brion. During the Second World War, the building was used as a hospital to shelter wounded soldiers. The British writer Vincent Cronin (Cronogue) resided there until his death in January 2011.
