= Tombelaine =

Small tidal island in Manche, France

Coordinates: 48°39′36″N 01°30′46″W

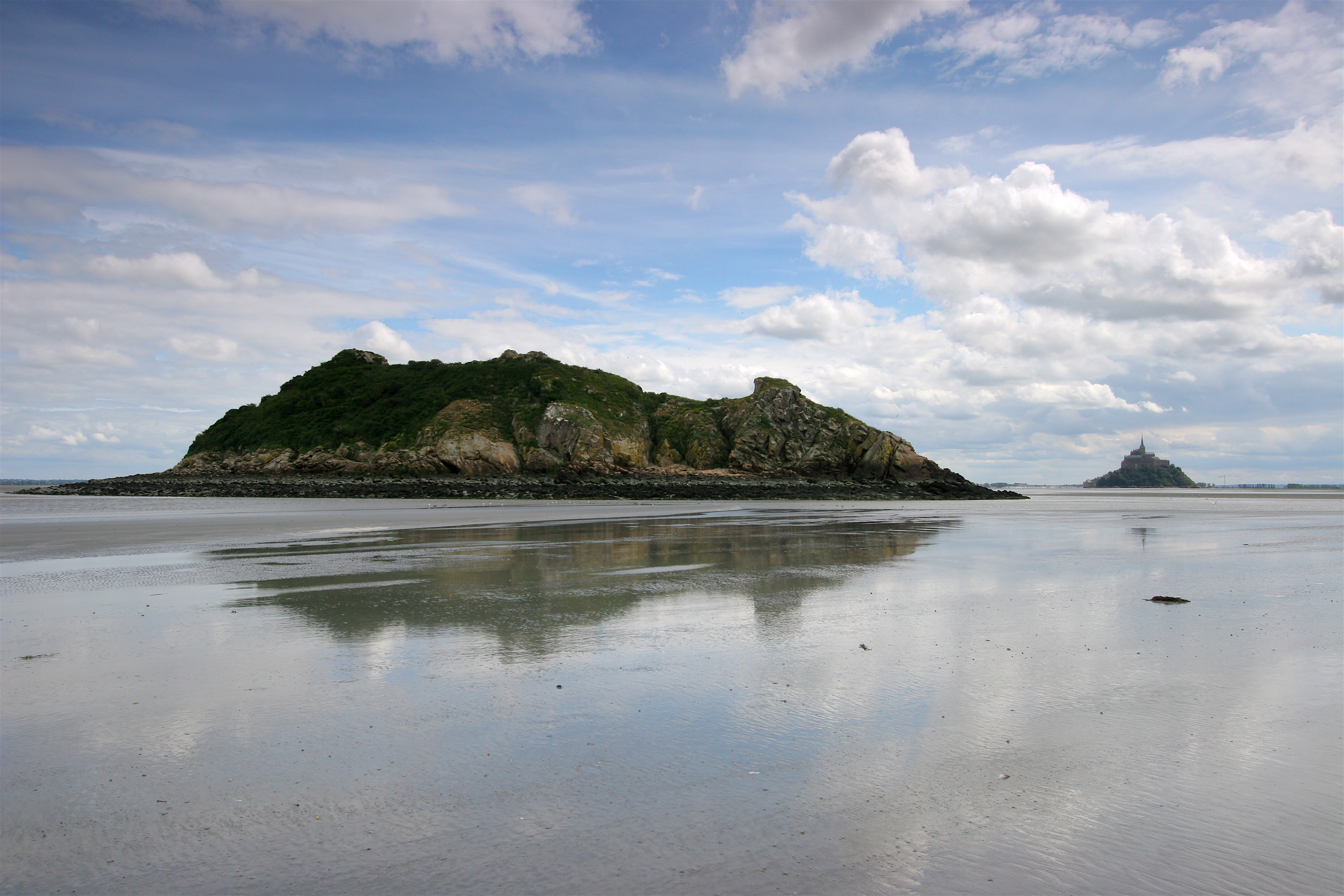
Tombelaine and Mont Saint Michel (to the right)

Tombelaine (French pronunciation: [tɔ̃blɛn]) is a small tidal island off the coast of Normandy in France. It lies a few kilometres north of Mont Saint-Michel. At low tide, the island can be reached on foot (with a guide) from the coast of Cotentin, 3.5 kilometres (2.2 miles) to the northeast, and from Mont Saint-Michel.

The granite island lies just to the south of the course of the Sélune river, which has to be forded to access the island from Cotentin. It is 250 m (820 ft) by 150 m (490 ft), and 45 m (148 ft) high. Administratively, it is in the commune of Genêts.

== Name ==
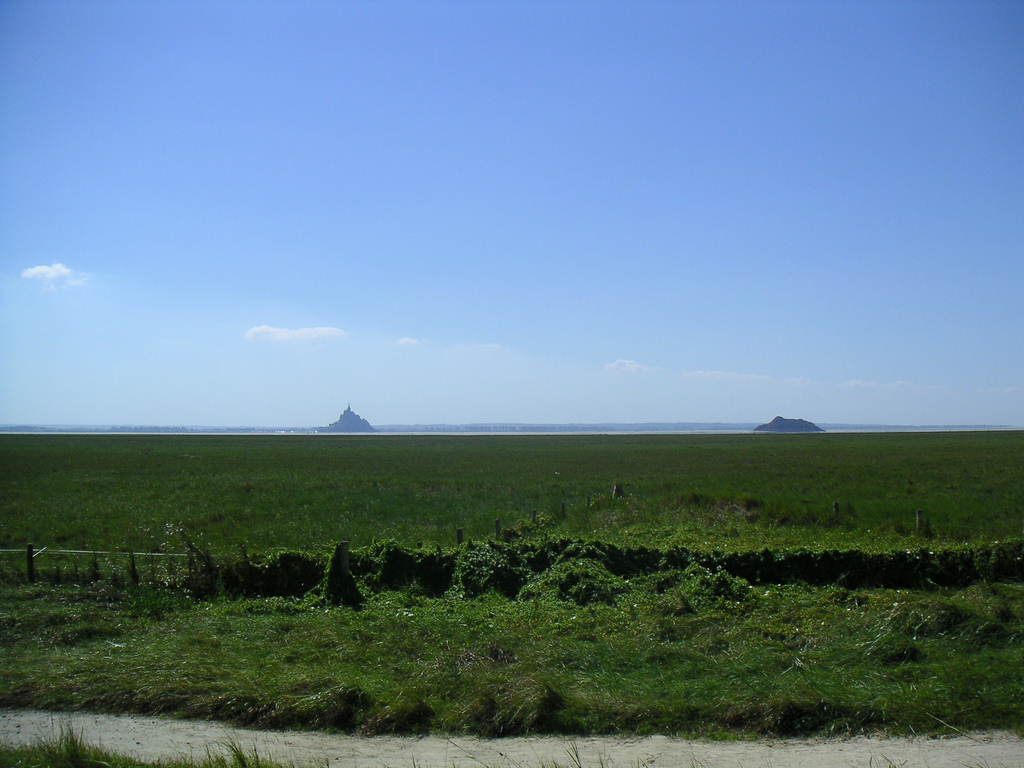
Tombelaine (right) and Mont Saint-Michel seen from the salt marsh

According to one folk etymology, the name is a contraction of “the tomb of Hélène”, referring to a supposed daughter of King Hoël buried on the rock.

The name could also come from tumulus belenis (“tumulus of Belenos”, a Celtic god), or from the Celtic words meaning “the little mountain”, in comparison to Mont Saint-Michel, once called Mont Tombe.

== History ==
In the 11th century, two monks from Mont Saint-Michel were hermits on Tombelaine. In 1137, Bernard du Bec founded a priory on the island, and it became a pilgrimage site .

On 11 February 1423, during the Hundred Years War, Tombelaine was occupied by the English as a base from which to attack Mont Saint-Michel. In the 16th-century French religious wars, Gabriel, comte de Montgomery, leader of the Huguenot armies, occupied the island.

In 1666, the marquis de la Chastrière ordered the destruction of the island's fortifications, in case these be used again by the English.

At the end of the 19th century, a legend about a “Marquis de Tombelaine” was created as part of the burgeoning tourist industry around Mont Saint-Michel.

The island was purchased by the state in 1933, and was declared a historic monument by a decree of 1936. It became a bird reserve in 1985.
