= Genêts =

- Commune
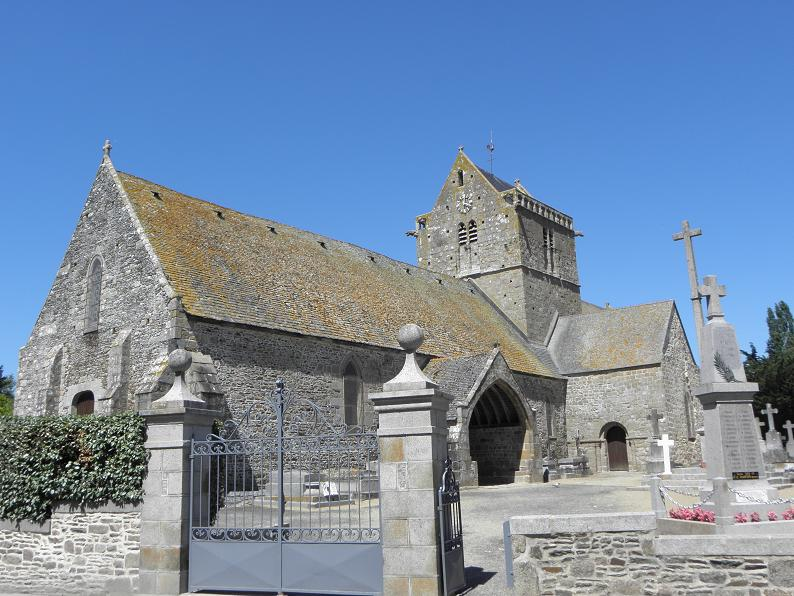
- The church in Genêts
- Location of Genêts
- Location within France Location within Normandy
- Coordinates: 48°41′06″N 1°28′26″W
- Country: France
- Region: Normandy
- Department: Manche
- Arrondissement: Avranches
- Canton: Avranches
- Intercommunality: CA Mont-Saint-Michel-Normandie

Government
  - Mayor (2020–2026): Catherine Brunaud-Rhyn
- Area^{1}: 6.89 km^{2} (2.66 sq mi)
- Elevation: 10 m (33 ft)
- Highest elevation: 38 m (125 ft)
- Lowest elevation: 6 m (20 ft)
- Population (2023): 451
  - Density: 65.5/km^{2} (170/sq mi)
- Time zone: UTC+01:00 (CET)
  - Summer (DST): UTC+02:00 (CEST)
- INSEE/Postal code: 50199 /50530
- ^{1} French Land Register data, which excludes lakes, ponds, glaciers > 1 km^{2} (0.386 sq mi or 247 acres) and river estuaries.

Genêts (French pronunciation: [ʒənɛ]) is a commune in the department of Manche, in northwestern France. It was the port of the oppidum Ingena (now Avranches), the main settlement of the Abrincatui.

The Manoir de Brion, an ancient Benedictine priory of the abbey of Mont Saint-Michel is located nearby. The tidal island of Tombelaine, 3.5 km (2.2 mi) offshore, is in the commune.

== Demographic evolution ==
Historical population
Year	Pop.	±% p.a.
1968	501	—
1975	524	+0.64%
1982	524	+0.00%
1990	481	−1.06%
1999	439	−1.01%
2007	447	+0.23%
2012	413	−1.57%
2017	435	+1.04%
2023	451	+0.60%
Source: INSEE

== Administration ==
=== Mayors ===
List of mayors
Period	Mayor
1791–1803	Pierre-Guillaume Bienvenu
1803–1808	Auguste Duchemin
1808–1810	Louis Chesnay
1810–1848	Pierre Estorre
1848–1859	Emile Dupont
1859–1868	Constantin Le Clerc
1868–1884	Paul Piton
1884–1913	Paul Lenepveu De Dungy
1913–1929	Victor Morin
1929–1935	Alfred Duchemin
1935–1959	Maurice Lesrel
1959-1959	Martial Vinour
1959–1963	Jean Simon
1963–1972	René Chesnay
1972–1977	Michel Lemeteyer
1977–1979	André Michel
1979–1983	Emmanuel Leveilley
1983–1989	Henri Tropee
1989–1995	Marie-Claire Daniel
1995–2014	Jacques Hec
2014–2026	Catherine Brunaud-Rhyn
Source : Mayor's Office.

== See also ==
- Communes of the Manche department
