= Alexander MacGowan =

Alexander MacGowan may refer to:

- Alexander Henry Boswall MacGowan (1850–1927), businessman and political figure in British Columbia
- Alexander Gault MacGowan (1894–1970), war correspondent during World War II
