= Édouard Corroyer =

French architect (1835–1904)

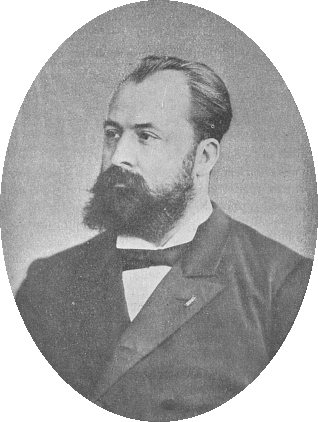
Édouard Corroyer (date unknown)

Édouard-Jules Corroyer (14 September 1835, Amiens – 30 January 1904, Paris) was a French architect and restorer.

== Biography ==
He came from a family that was involved in the building trades. His father was a carpenter, and his grandfather was a slater. After completing his secondary education, he became a student of the architect Eugène Viollet-le-Duc. In the 1860s, he designed the City Hall in Roanne, a church in Vougy, and the Château de Fleyriat in Ain.

Later, he developed an interest in medieval architecture, and was an active participant in the restoration of Soissons Cathedral. In 1871, he was attached to the Commission of Historical Monuments. Three years later, after a preliminary study, he was engaged to do restorative work at Mont-Saint-Michel Abbey, with Paul Gout as his assistant, and published several studies. While working there he brought his maid, Anne Boutiaut Poulard, who later opened a restaurant and created the famous "Omelette de la mère Poulard".

From 1878 to 1882, he was also involved in supervising construction at the headquarters of the Comptoir d'Escompte de Paris; work which earned him the title of Knight in the Legion of Honor. He obtained the post of Inspector General of Diocesan Buildings in 1885. During these years, he was also an architecture critic for the Gazette des Beaux-Arts.

In 1886, following the departure of Honoré Daumet, he was a competitor for completing construction of the Sacré-Cœur Basilica, but was not chosen. Two years later, he was removed from the project at Mont-Saint-Michel, and replaced by Victor Petitgrand (1842–1898). Over the next three years, he published his works, L'Architecture Romane and L'Architecture Gothique.

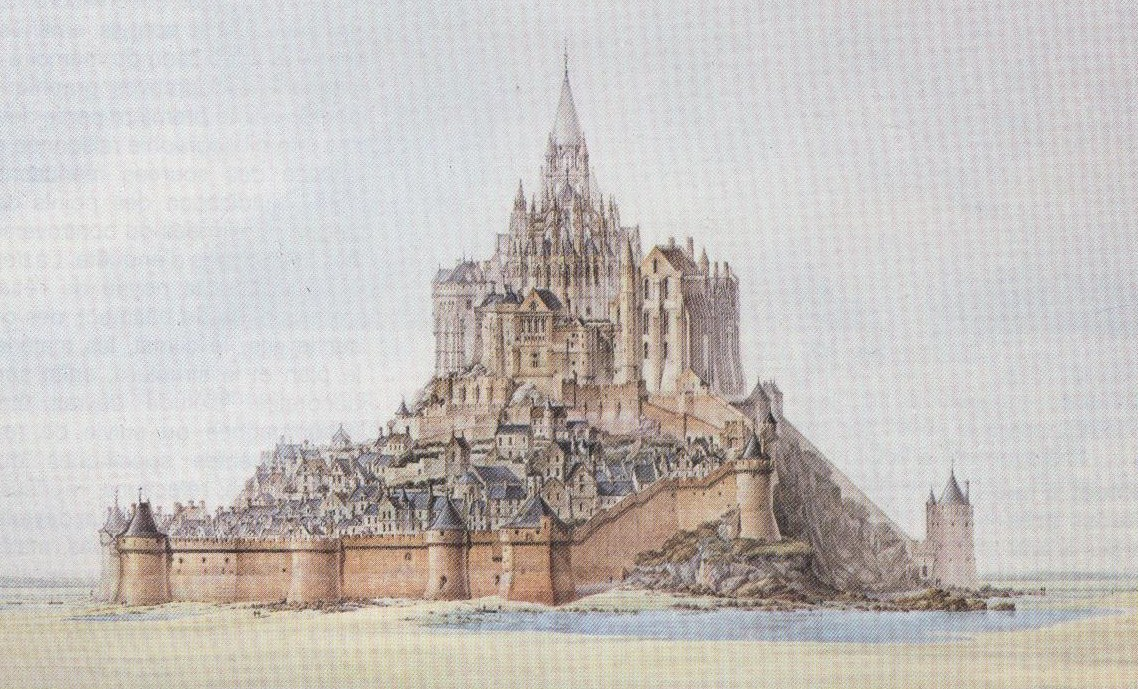
Watercolor sketch of Mont-Saint-Michel (1873)

His last major projects involved two funerary monuments, including the Monument to the Dead of the War of 1870, in Nantes. He also proposed a project for the Church of Saint-Catherine in Villeneuve-sur-Lot. In 1896, he was elected a member of the Académie des Beaux-Arts, taking Seat #10 in the "Unattached" section.
