= Omelette de la mère Poulard =

French egg dish

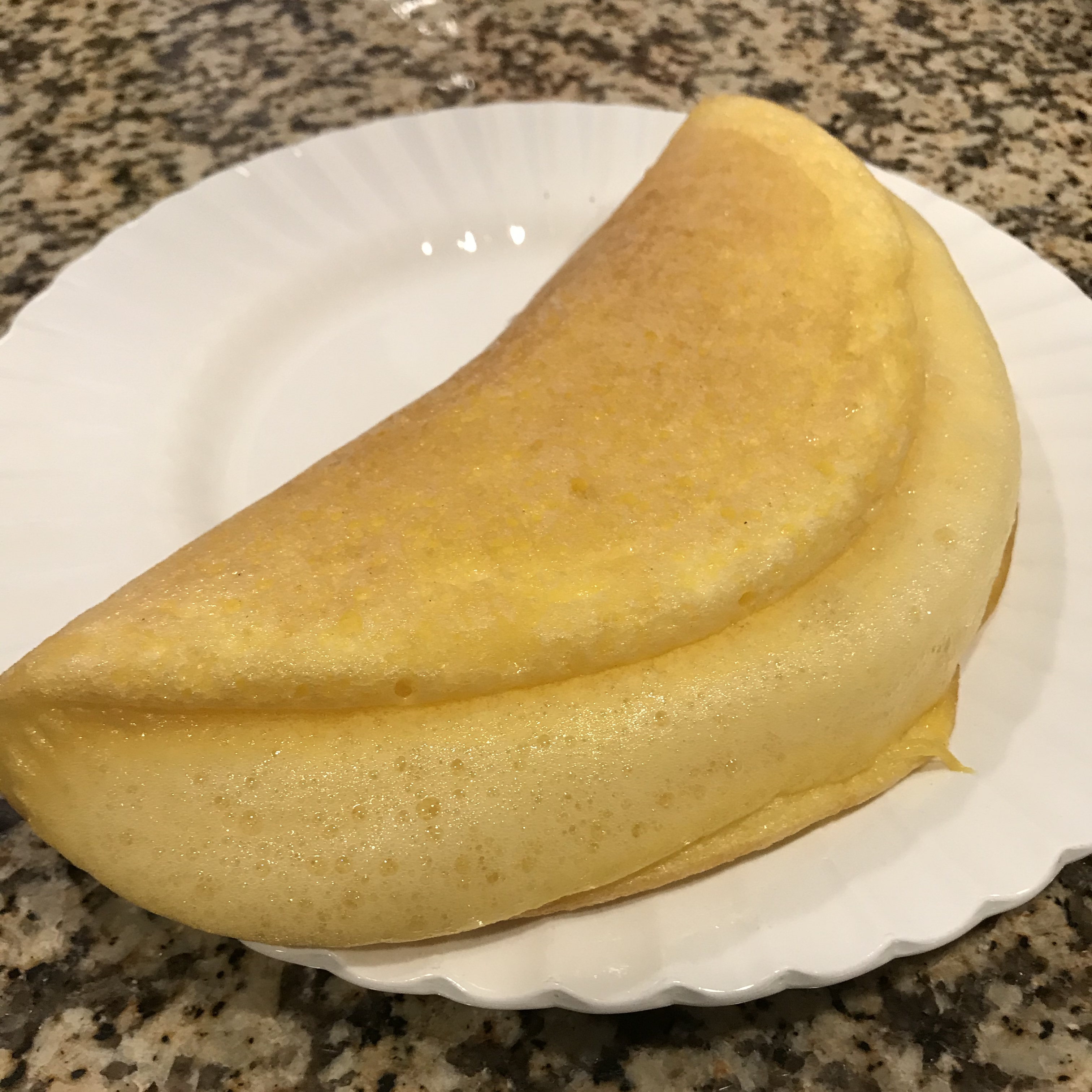
Omelette de la mère Poulard

The Omelette de la mère Poulard (Omelette of Mother Poulard) is an omelette developed by Anne Boutiaut Poulard, also known as Mother Poulard, in the 19th century in Mont-Saint-Michel, France. It is served at La Mère Poulard, her restaurant there, and at many other restaurants on the small island.

It has been described as the most famous omelette in the world and, along with the Mont Saint Michel Abbey, is one of the major tourist attractions in Mont-Saint-Michel, the island itself being the second most-visited tourist destination in France after Paris. Those who have eaten it include European and Japanese royalty, United States presidents, British prime ministers, multiple presidents of France, and celebrities from various fields. It is considered the gastronomic emblem of Mont-Saint-Michel.

== Creation ==
The omelette de la mère Poulard was created by Annette Boutiaut Poulard, and is a specialty in the Mont-Saint-Michel area of Normandy. In 1873, Poulard and her husband were innkeepers on the island. Because of the changing tides, it was impossible to predict when and how many travellers would arrive, which made planning ahead for service difficult. The omelette was created to solve this problem and was served as an appetizer that could be produced quickly while guests awaited the rest of the meal. The omelette eventually became famous as a gastronomic emblem of the town of Mont-Saint-Michel; a 1932 account described the omelette as being on the menu of all the restaurants in the town.

== Preparation ==
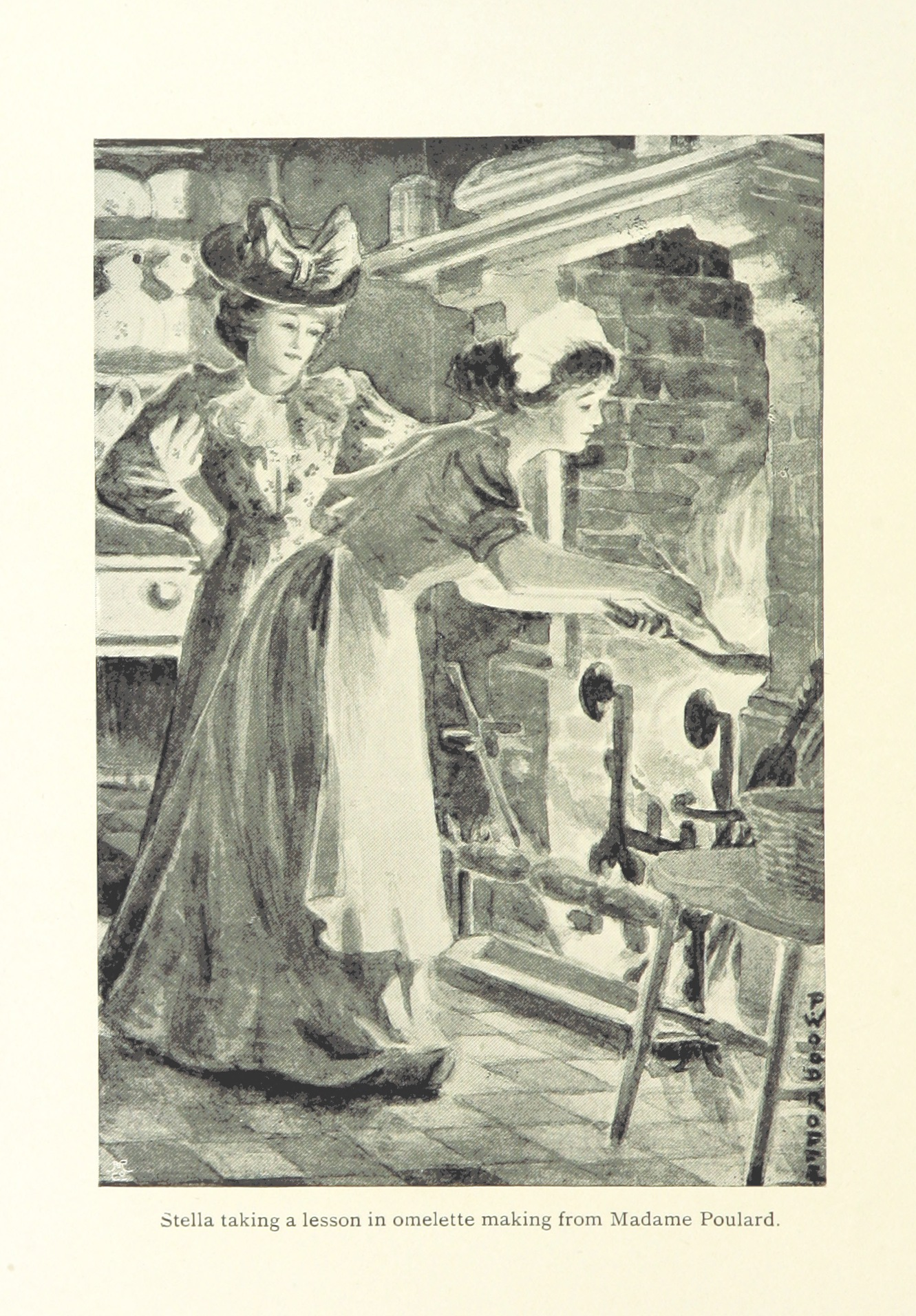
Stella taking a lesson in omelette making from Madame Poulard

Sources vary on the method of preparation. According to some sources, the yolks and whites are beaten separately, the whites until stiff, and then folded together to form the mixture. According to a contemporary, Poulard told him she "took the eggs and beat them as they were."

Depending on the source, butter or crème fraîche is dropped into a hot long-handled copper pan, the pan is placed into a hot oven until the butter is melted, then the egg mixture is added, and the pan placed over a wood-fired flame to cook. Poulard responded to a request for the recipe with

Monsieur Viel, Here is the recipe for the omelette: I break some good eggs in a bowl, I beat them well, I put a good piece of butter in the pan, I throw the eggs into it, and I shake it constantly. I am happy, monsieur, if this recipe pleases you.

— Annette Poulard

Cookery writer Felicity Cloake in 2019 gave instructions to whisk whole eggs vigorously for four minutes until "almost like a mousse", then pour into a hot oiled pan.

In an 1897 novel, Stella's Story, the heroine takes a lesson in omelette-making from Poulard, and describes the process as "simple in the extreme; [Poulard] broke a dozen eggs into the pan of boiling fat, as fast as she could break them, gave them a shake, and held them over the fire for a minute, shaking them the while; then she took an iron ladle, gave the omelette a couple of folds, and popped it onto a dish."

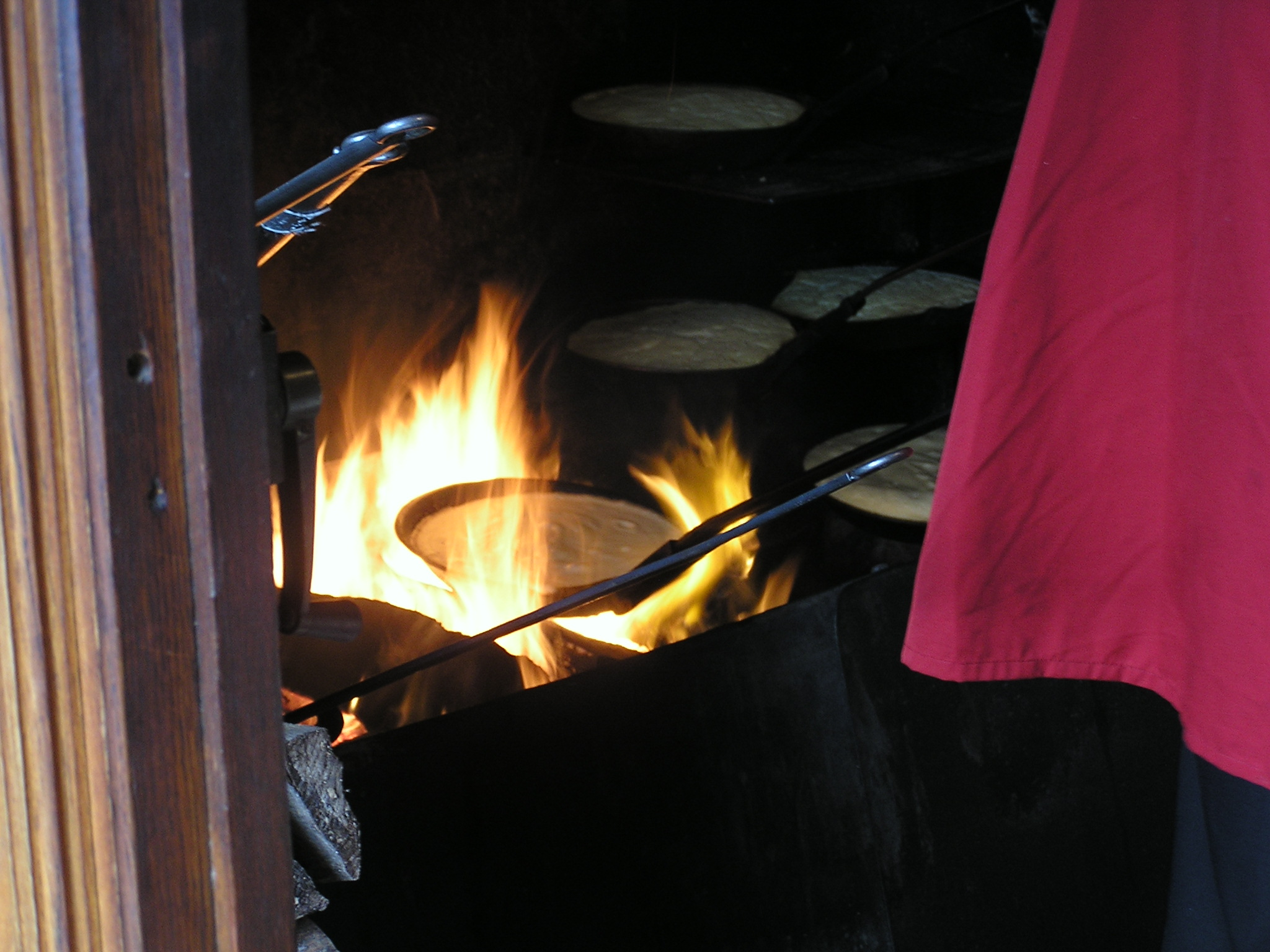
Omelettes cooking on a wood fire at La Mère Poulard

== Serving ==
The finished omelette is rolled onto a plate and served plain or with a variety of garnishes. It has been described as "gently wood-scented".

In Poulard's time the omelettes were served as part of a meal which was always the same, and included ham, fried sole, saltmarsh lamb cutlets with potatoes, roast chicken, salad, and dessert. Before World War I the meal was priced at 2.50 (old) francs, equivalent to USD $0.50 at the then-current exchange rate.

As of 2017, the omelette was priced at €34 at La Mère Poulard, a price described as "certainly one of the heftiest tariffs charged for same anywhere in France". As of 2018, 450,000 eggs are used each year by the restaurant.

== Recognition ==
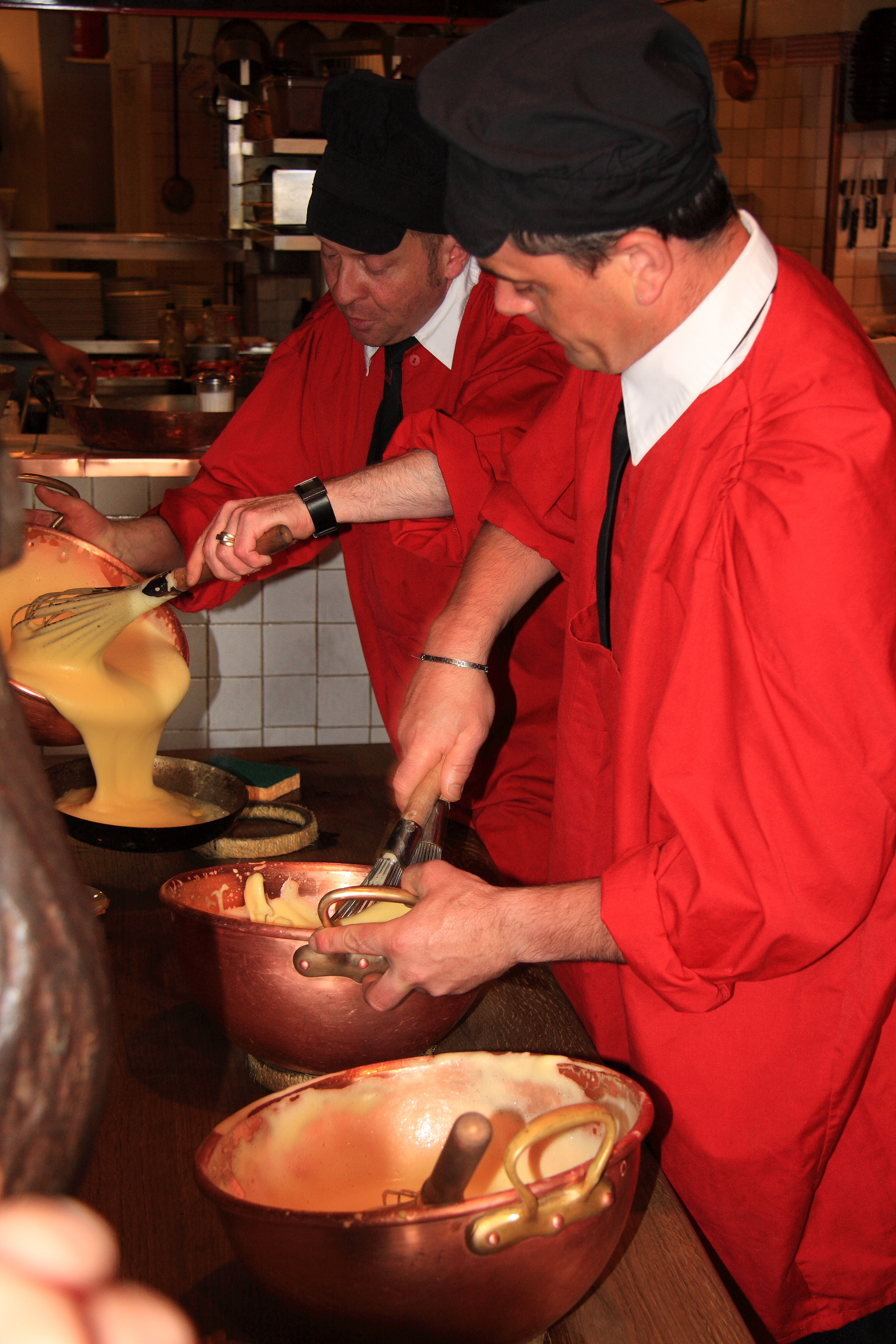
Preparing the omelette

Felicity Cloake, writing in The Guardian, called it "the world's most famous omelette". Along with the Mont Saint Michel Abbey, is one of the major tourist attractions in Mont-Saint-Michel, itself one of the most-visited tourist destinations in the country, second only to Paris. Those who have eaten it include European and Japanese royalty, United States presidents, British prime ministers, presidents of France, and celebrities such as Ernest Hemingway and Yves Saint Laurent.

A superstition surrounding the omelette holds that if a French presidential candidate visits Mont-Saint-Michel and does not eat the omelette, the candidate will lose. The story of "Omelette tu mangeras, président tu seras," roughly "eat the omelette, and president you will become," started with Georges Clemenceau, who visited but did not eat the omelette before his defeat by Paul Deschanel. Charles de Gaulle, Georges Pompidou and François Mitterrand all ate the omelette before their victories; Édouard Balladur visited Mont-Saint-Michel but due to a late arrival did not eat the omelette and was defeated by Jacques Chirac, who ate the omelette. Nicolas Sarkozy launched his successful 2007 campaign from Mont-Saint-Michel and ate the omelette.
