= Bernard du Bec =

Benedictine monk and abbot

Bernard du Bec (died May 8, 1149), also known as Bernard le Vénérable, was a Benedictine monk who served as the thirteenth abbot of Mont Saint-Michel. He belonged to a high-ranking noble family in Normandy.
