= Le Mont Saint Michel (clothing) =

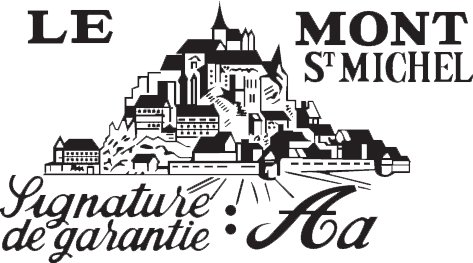
- Industry: Retail
- Founded: 1913 Louvigné du Désert
- Area served: Worldwide
- Products: Clothing
- Owner: Alexandre Milan
- Website: lemontsaintmichel.fr

The work-wear brand Le Mont St Michel was launched in 1913 in Pontorson, just a few miles away from the famous abbey after which it was named.

== Company history ==
In 1920, Caroline Lesaffre founded a textile company in Wizernes (Pas-de-Calais), "Les Tricotages de l'Aa", which combined a factory with a school for young women whose fathers, brothers and husbands had not returned from World War I.

In 1964, Patrice Milan, Lessafre's grandson, took the reins of the company and modernised it by installing high-performance knitting machines. A lover of French country estates, he bought the Chateau de Monthorin. The Tricotages de l'Aa continued to prosper by manufacturing for well-known designers such as agnès b., Gerard Darel and Joseph.

In 1998, Alexandre Milan, succeeded his father as head of the company, acquired the tradename Le Mont Saint-Michel, combined the two companies and created a new brand under the Le Mont Saint-Michel name.
