= Anne Boutiaut Poulard =

French cook and innkeeper

Mother Poulard
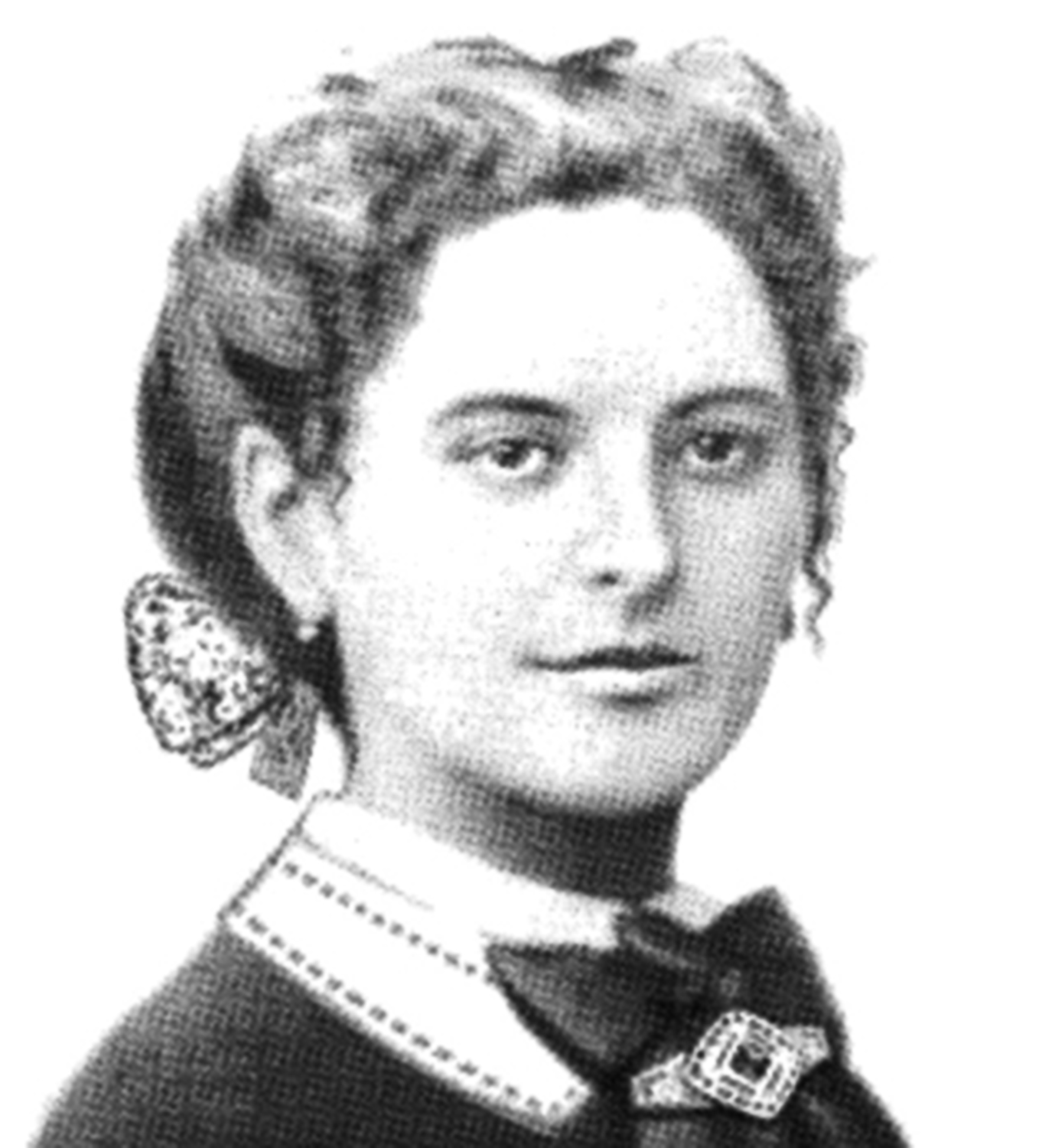
- Anne Boutiaut at the time of her marriage
- Born: Anne Boutiaut; 15 April 1851; Nevers, France
- Died: 7 May 1931 (aged 80); Mont Saint-Michel, France

Anne "Annette" Boutiaut Poulard (15 April 1851 – 7 May 1931), one of the Mères of France, was known as Mère Poulard (Mother Poulard), and was a cook and innkeeper in Mont-Saint-Michel, France. She was noted for her omelette creation, the Omelette de la mère Poulard, which became a specialty of the region, and for her hospitality. Paul Bocuse wrote of her, "Mother Poulard is France!"

== Early life ==
Poulard was born Anne Boutiaut on April 15, 1851, in Mouësse in Nevers to Claude and Marie Boutiaut, who were market gardeners.

She was working as a maid for Édouard Corroyer, chief architect of the Historic Monuments, when in 1872 he was assigned the restoration of the Mont-St-Michel Abbey and moved his household there. At age 21, she met Victor Poulard, a baker's son. She married him on January 14, 1873, at Saint Philippe-Du-Roule. The couple rented the Tête d'Or hostel in the Grande Rue du Mont-Saint-Michel from an uncle of Victor Poulard's the same year.

== Career ==
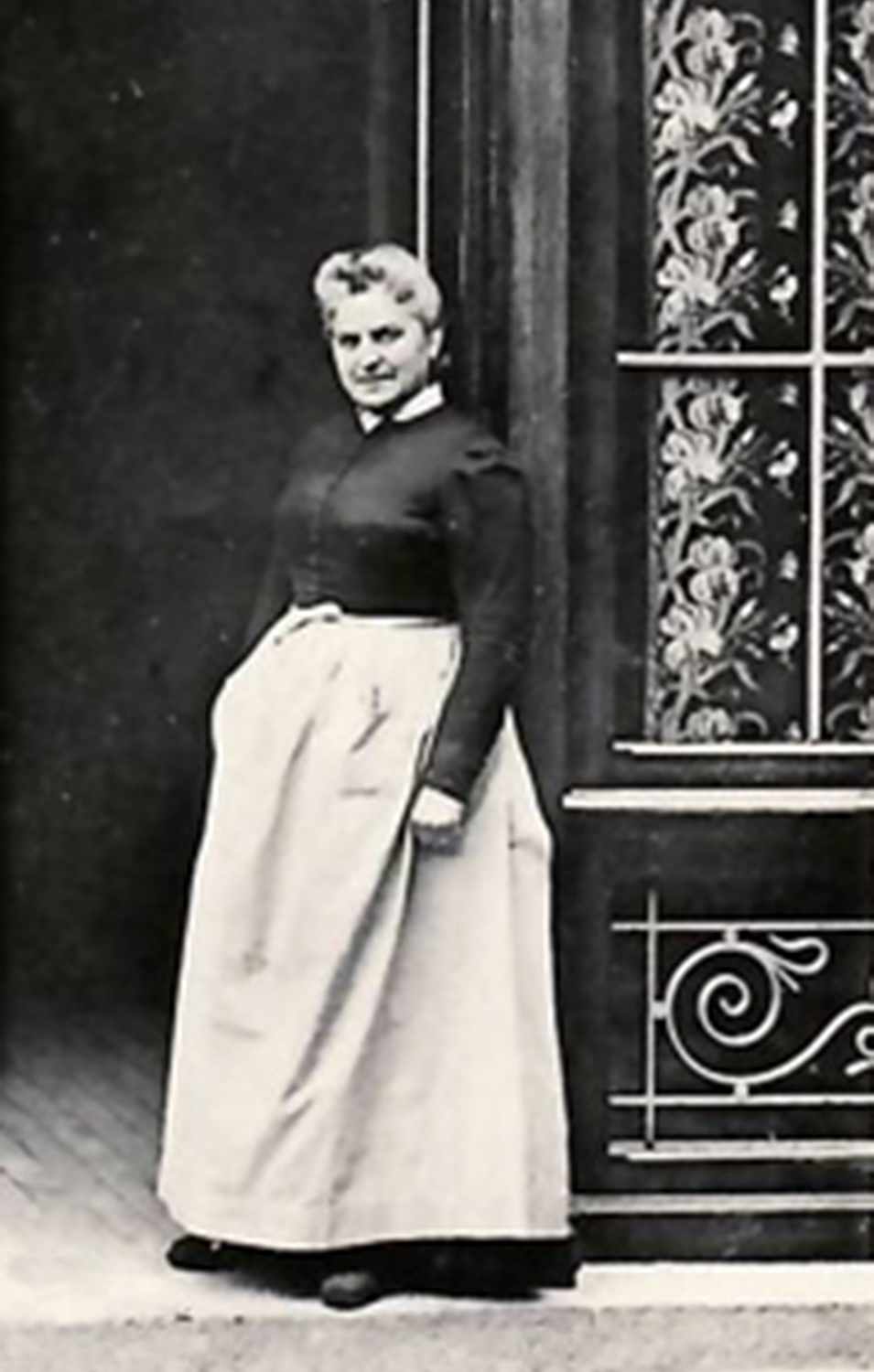
Mother Poulard in front of her restaurant

While operating the Tête d'Or, Poulard noticed that many customers, most of whom were travellers arriving by ferry, arrived very hungry and wanted to be served quickly. Uncertainty about how many travellers would arrive and when because of the changing tides made planning ahead for service impractical. She created her omelette, known as the Omelette de la mère Poulard (Omelette of Mother Poulard) to solve this problem.

Victor Poulard's uncle, seeing the restaurant's success, evicted them to open his own restaurant in the building. The Poulards opened Auberge in 1888 in a location closer to the docks. The couple opened two additional hotels, Hôtel La Mère Poulard and Hôtel Les Terrasses Poulard. The original Auberge restaurant is now called La Mère Poulard.

== Hospitality ==
According to a contemporary account by the local priest, she gave customers "the impression that they were crossing the threshold of the family home."

== Omelette ==
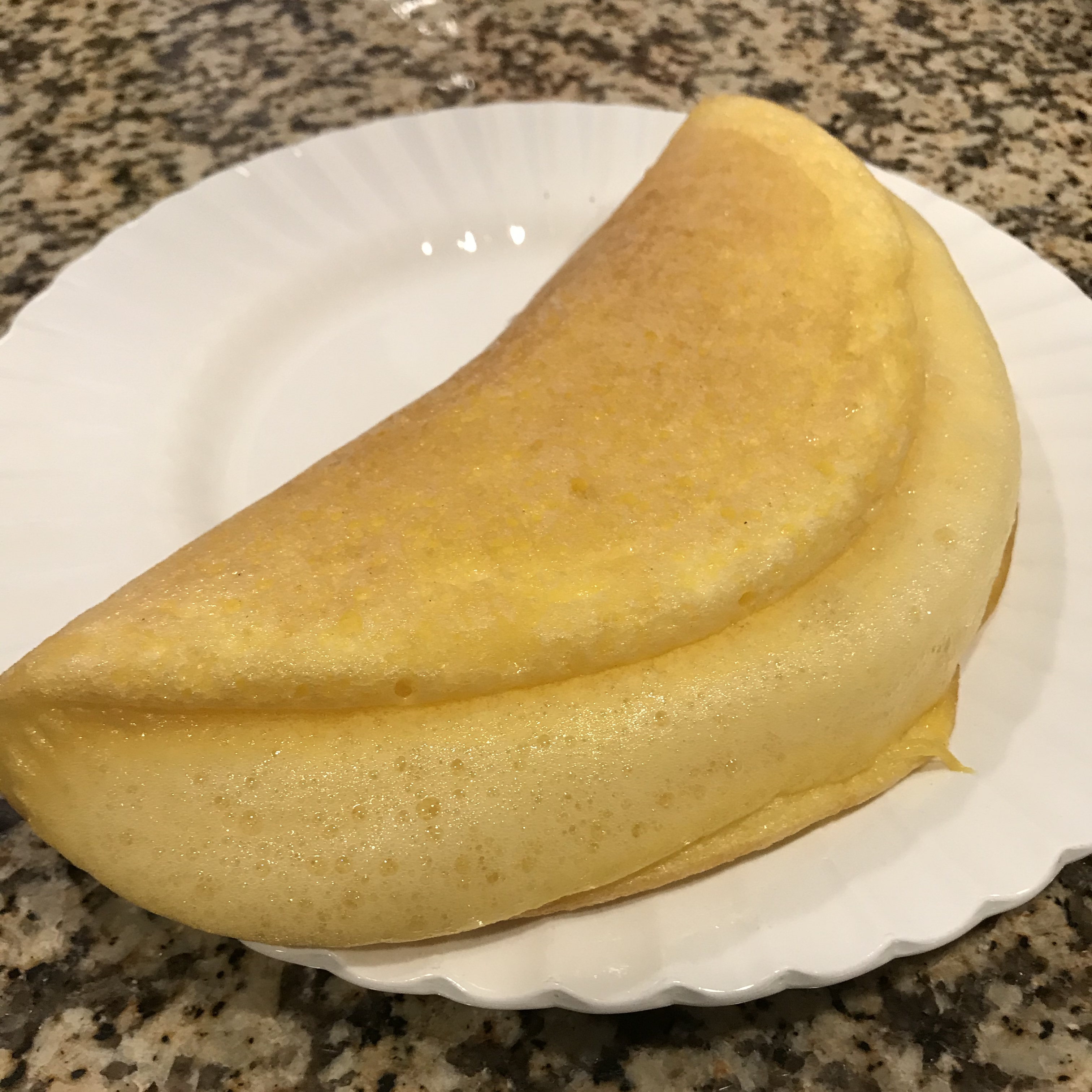
Omelette de la merè Poulard

There are many different descriptions of the way the omelette de la mère Poulard is prepared. It has been described as a soufflé omelette made with crème fraîche and butter. It is a specialty in the Mont-Saint-Michel area of Normandy and the "gastronomic emblem of the city."

According to one account, the yolks and whites are beaten separately. The whites are beaten until stiff and folded with the yolks. Crème fraîche is dropped into a hot pan, which is placed into a hot oven until melted, then the egg mixture is added and the pan placed over a flame to cook. The finished omelette is rolled onto a plate and served plain or with a variety of garnishes. As of 2017 the omelette was priced at €34 at the Mère Poulard restaurant.

Poulard herself responded to a request for the recipe with

I break some good eggs in a bowl, I beat them well, I put a good piece of butter in the pan, I throw the eggs into it, and I shake it constantly.

== Legacy ==
By 1932, the omelette was on the regular menu of every restaurant in the city, according to a contemporary. Food writer David Lebovitz called it the most celebrated omelette in the world. Paul Bocuse, after dining at Auberge, wrote in the guest book, "Mother Poulard is France!"

In 2006 The Tribune of India referred to the omelette as, along with the Abbey, one of the city's major tourist attractions. In 2007, Le Devoir said Poulard became "a legend during her lifetime" and is considered one of the "mothers" of France, along with Mère Denis and Mère Brazier. In his 2016 book Les illustres de la Table, Simmat Burniat wrote, "with her famous omelet, she is the first woman to write her name for eternity in the grimoire of planetary gastronomy".

Anne Poulard's husband died on October 10, 1924, and she died on May 7, 1931. The couple are buried in the parish churchyard of eglise St-Pierre on Mont-Saint-Michel. Their epitaph reads "Here lie Annette and Victor Poulard, good spouses, good hoteliers. May the Lord welcome them as they welcomed their guests."
