= La Mère Poulard =

Restaurant in Mont-Saint-Michel, France

Coordinates: 48.6350°N 1.5111°W

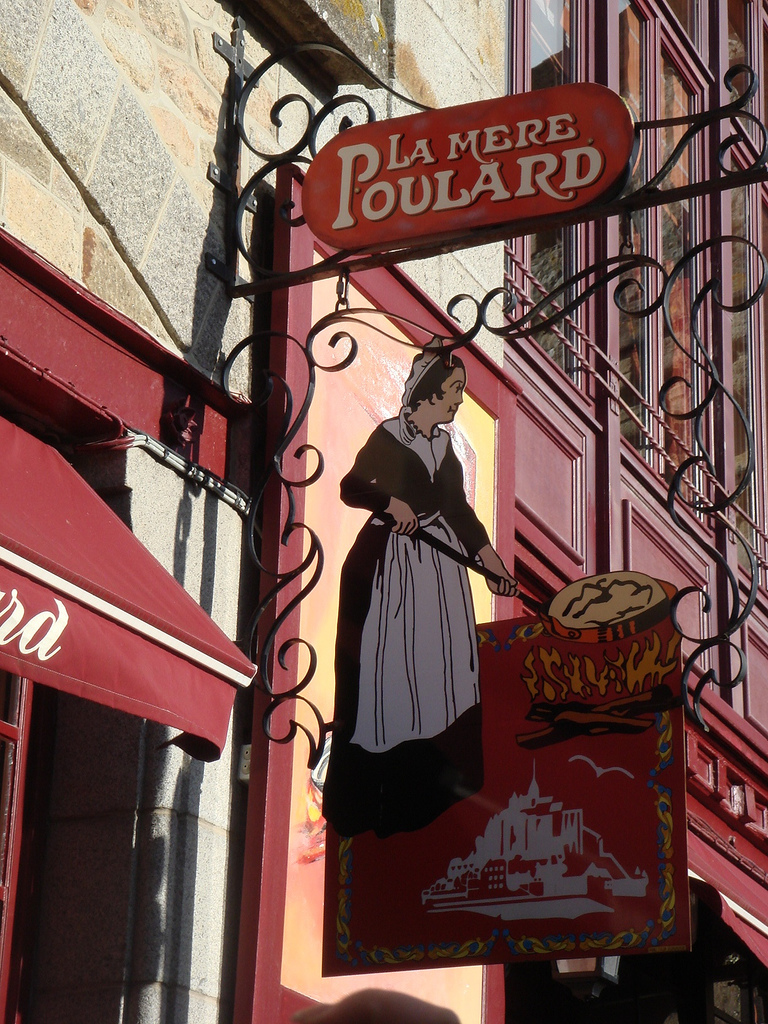
Sign of La Mère Poulard

La Mère Poulard is a restaurant and hotel on Mont Saint-Michel. The restaurant dates back to 1879, and is known for the wall of autographs from over a century of famous diners, including Ernest Hemingway and Yves Saint Laurent. Furthermore, American cameraman Jack Lieb, in his private video collections, cites how popular the restaurant was among war correspondents during World War II.

== History ==
The restaurant was founded by Anne "Annette" Boutiaut (1851–1931), who married Victor Poulard on 14 January 1873 and founded the Hostellerie de la Tête d'Or, finding that customers came and went quickly with the tide, giving them the idea of cooking giant omelettes in a wooden hearth to make them stay.

Therefore, the restaurant became most famous for its speciality, Omelette de la mère Poulard, a giant omelette several inches thick, made in hand-hammered copper bowls, and cooked over an open fire. The omelettes resemble a soufflé more than a traditional omelette. In summer 2009 the cheapest omelette on the menu at the restaurant is €18 per 100 gram (the minimal portion is 250 gram, thus €45 for the dish). However, in June 2012 the price had already risen to €25 per 100 gram and the minimal portion was 300 gram, resulting in a €75 "basic" omelette, served with half a grilled lobster and truffled potatoes. In 2025 the cheapest omelette on the menu is a €39 vegetable omelette.
