= Alexander Gault MacGowan =

- Born: 7 February 1894 Manchester, England
- Died: 30 November 1970 (aged 76) Heidelberg, Germany
- Resting place: Heidelberg, Germany
- Occupation: Journalist, war correspondent
- Language: English

Alexander Gault MacGowan (7 February 1894 – 30 November 1970) was a leading war correspondent during World War II. Born to Scottish parents in Manchester, England, he was educated at Manchester Grammar School. MacGowan served with the British army in India during World War I. On 23 May 1923, he received a lieutenant's commission in the 8th Light Cavalry of the Army in India Reserve of Officers. From 1929 to 1934, while he was the editor of the Trinidad Guardian, MacGowan hired Seepersad Naipaul, the father of Nobel prize-winning V. S. Naipaul, to write features for that newspaper. In October 1934, MacGowan began a sixteen-year stint with The Sun of New York, later known as the New York World-Telegram and Sun. He rose from correspondent to become managing editor of The Sun's European Bureau after the war.

Before the war, MacGowan won a Selfridge Award in 1932 for an article about Devil's Island in The Times. Later, he covered the coronations of King George VI and Queen Elizabeth II, the Spanish Civil War, and spent time in Morocco with the French Foreign Legion (1937). During World War II, MacGowan continued writing for The Sun, covering the Battle of Britain, the disastrous Dieppe raid (in which he wrote about dive bomber strafing and depth charges around his ship). Reporting later from North Africa, Ernie Pyle referred to him as the "oldest" correspondent there, fearlessly popping up from his foxhole to interview soldiers between incoming rounds. After the defeat of Rommel in Africa, MacGowan transferred to Italy, and in 1944 covered the D-Day landings in northern France. On 15 August 1944, he had one of his closest brushes with death as he was captured, along with a couple of other correspondents, by two German light tanks firing machine guns at them. His friend William Makin, on the jeep with him, was critically wounded. MacGowan's capture was reported in daily newspapers in London, New York and elsewhere around the world. The headline in The New York Times read, "MacGowan of Sun Captured in France; Nazis Report Companion Hurt in 'Scrape'". A couple of days later, he eluded his captors by leaping from a prisoner-of-war train in the middle of the night. In April and May 1945 he gave The Sun eyewitness reports of the liberation of the Buchenwald and Dachau death camps.

After the war, MacGowan worked as European Bureau chief of The Sun until the newspaper was sold to the Scripps-Howard chain and absorbed into the New York World-Telegram in January 1950. The World-Telegram and Sun dropped all nonunion Sun employees after a strike that began in January 1950, among them MacGowan. He then became a European correspondent for the North American Newspaper Alliance, also starting a venture of his own with the production of a series of small guidebooks for tourists, such as "Heidelberg Confidential," and "Switzerland Confidential." In 1956 he began to devote all his efforts to writing and publishing the travel newspaper, European Life, first in Munich, then after 1963 in Heidelberg.

MacGowan died on 30 November 1970, at his home in Heidelberg, as a result of complications from osteoporosis.
